= 2023 BWF World Tour =

Tournament details
- Dates: 10 January – 17 December
- Edition: 6th

The 2023 BWF World Tour (officially known as 2023 HSBC BWF World Tour for sponsorship reasons), was the sixth season of the BWF World Tour of badminton, a circuit of 30 tournaments that lead up to the World Tour Finals tournament. The 31 tournaments are divided into five levels: Level 1 is the said World Tour Finals, Level 2 called Super 1000 (4 tournaments), Level 3 called Super 750 (6 tournaments), Level 4 called Super 500 (9 tournaments) and Level 5 called Super 300 (11 tournaments). Each of these tournaments offers different ranking points and prize money. The highest points and prize pool are offered at the Super 1000 level (including the World Tour Finals).

One other category of the tournament, the BWF Tour Super 100 (level 6), also offers BWF World Tour ranking points. It still acts as an important part of the pathway and entry point for players into the BWF World Tour tournaments. BWF announced that there will be nine tournaments for the BWF Tour Super 100 in 2023. When the nine Level 6 grade tournaments of the BWF Tour Super 100 were included, the complete tour consisted of 40 tournaments.

== Results ==
Below is the schedule released by the Badminton World Federation:

== Key ==
World Tour Finals
Super 1000 (4)
Super 750 (6)
Super 500 (9)
Super 300 (11)
Super 100 (9)

== Winners ==
Tour	Report	Men's singles	Women's singles	Men's doubles	Women's doubles	Mixed doubles
World Tour Finals
BWF World Tour Finals	Report	(Denmark) Viktor Axelsen	(Chinese Taipei) Tai Tzu-ying	(South Korea) Kang Min-hyuk (South Korea) Seo Seung-jae	(China) Chen Qingchen (China) Jia Yifan	(China) Zheng Siwei (China) Huang Yaqiong
Super 1000
Malaysia Open	Report	(Denmark) Viktor Axelsen	(Japan) Akane Yamaguchi	(Indonesia) Fajar Alfian (Indonesia) Muhammad Rian Ardianto	(China) Chen Qingchen (China) Jia Yifan	(China) Zheng Siwei (China) Huang Yaqiong
All England Open	Report	(China) Li Shifeng	(South Korea) An Se-young	(Indonesia) Fajar Alfian (Indonesia) Muhammad Rian Ardianto	(South Korea) Kim So-yeong (South Korea) Kong Hee-yong	(China) Zheng Siwei (China) Huang Yaqiong
Indonesia Open	Report	(Denmark) Viktor Axelsen	(China) Chen Yufei	(India) Satwiksairaj Rankireddy (India) Chirag Shetty	(South Korea) Baek Ha-na (South Korea) Lee So-hee	(China) Zheng Siwei (China) Huang Yaqiong
China Open	Report	(Denmark) Viktor Axelsen	(South Korea) An Se-young	(China) Liang Weikeng (China) Wang Chang	(China) Chen Qingchen (China) Jia Yifan	(South Korea) Seo Seung-jae (South Korea) Chae Yoo-jung
Super 750
India Open	Report	(Thailand) Kunlavut Vitidsarn	(South Korea) An Se-young	(China) Liang Weikeng (China) Wang Chang	(Japan) Nami Matsuyama (Japan) Chiharu Shida	(Japan) Yuta Watanabe (Japan) Arisa Higashino
Singapore Open	Report	(Indonesia) Anthony Sinisuka Ginting	(South Korea) An Se-young	(Japan) Takuro Hoki (Japan) Yugo Kobayashi	(China) Chen Qingchen (China) Jia Yifan	(Denmark) Mathias Christiansen (Denmark) Alexandra Bøje
Japan Open	Report	(Denmark) Viktor Axelsen	(South Korea) An Se-young	(Chinese Taipei) Lee Yang (Chinese Taipei) Wang Chi-lin	(South Korea) Kim So-yeong (South Korea) Kong Hee-yong	(Japan) Yuta Watanabe (Japan) Arisa Higashino
Denmark Open	Report	(China) Weng Hongyang	(China) Chen Yufei	(Malaysia) Aaron Chia (Malaysia) Soh Wooi Yik	(China) Chen Qingchen (China) Jia Yifan	(China) Feng Yanzhe (China) Huang Dongping
French Open	Report	(Indonesia) Jonatan Christie	(China) Chen Yufei	(Denmark) Kim Astrup (Denmark) Anders Skaarup Rasmussen	(China) Liu Shengshu (China) Tan Ning	(China) Jiang Zhenbang (China) Wei Yaxin
China Masters	Report	(Japan) Kodai Naraoka	(China) Chen Yufei	(China) Liang Weikeng (China) Wang Chang	(Japan) Nami Matsuyama (Japan) Chiharu Shida	(China) Zheng Siwei (China) Huang Yaqiong
Super 500
Indonesia Masters	Report	(Indonesia) Jonatan Christie	(South Korea) An Se-young	(Indonesia) Leo Rolly Carnando (Indonesia) Daniel Marthin	(China) Liu Shengshu (China) Zhang Shuxian	(China) Feng Yanzhe (China) Huang Dongping
Malaysia Masters	Report	(India) Prannoy H. S.	(Japan) Akane Yamaguchi	(South Korea) Kang Min-hyuk (South Korea) Seo Seung-jae	(South Korea) Baek Ha-na (South Korea) Lee So-hee	(Thailand) Dechapol Puavaranukroh (Thailand) Sapsiree Taerattanachai
Thailand Open	Report	(Thailand) Kunlavut Vitidsarn	(South Korea) An Se-young	(China) Liang Weikeng (China) Wang Chang	(South Korea) Kim So-yeong (South Korea) Kong Hee-yong	(South Korea) Kim Won-ho (South Korea) Jeong Na-eun
Canada Open	Report	(India) Lakshya Sen	(Japan) Akane Yamaguchi	(Denmark) Kim Astrup (Denmark) Anders Skaarup Rasmussen	(Japan) Nami Matsuyama (Japan) Chiharu Shida	(Japan) Hiroki Midorikawa (Japan) Natsu Saito
Korea Open	Report	(Denmark) Anders Antonsen	(South Korea) An Se-young	(India) Satwiksairaj Rankireddy (India) Chirag Shetty	(China) Chen Qingchen (China) Jia Yifan	(China) Feng Yanzhe (China) Huang Dongping
Australian Open	Report	(China) Weng Hongyang	(United States) Beiwen Zhang	(South Korea) Kang Min-hyuk (South Korea) Seo Seung-jae	(South Korea) Kim So-yeong (South Korea) Kong Hee-yong	(China) Feng Yanzhe (China) Huang Dongping
Hong Kong Open	Report	(Indonesia) Jonatan Christie	(Japan) Akane Yamaguchi	(Denmark) Kim Astrup (Denmark) Anders Skaarup Rasmussen	(Indonesia) Apriyani Rahayu (Indonesia) Siti Fadia Silva Ramadhanti	(China) Guo Xinwa (China) Wei Yaxin
Arctic Open	Report	(Malaysia) Lee Zii Jia	(China) Han Yue	(Denmark) Kim Astrup (Denmark) Anders Skaarup Rasmussen	(China) Liu Shengshu (China) Tan Ning	(China) Feng Yanzhe (China) Huang Dongping
Japan Masters	Report	(Denmark) Viktor Axelsen	(Indonesia) Gregoria Mariska Tunjung	(China) He Jiting (China) Ren Xiangyu	(China) Zhang Shuxian (China) Zheng Yu	(China) Zheng Siwei (China) Huang Yaqiong
Super 300
Thailand Masters	Report	(Chinese Taipei) Lin Chun-yi	(China) Zhang Yiman	(Indonesia) Leo Rolly Carnando (Indonesia) Daniel Marthin	(Thailand) Benyapa Aimsaard (Thailand) Nuntakarn Aimsaard	(China) Feng Yanzhe (China) Huang Dongping
German Open	Report	(Hong Kong) Ng Ka Long	(Japan) Akane Yamaguchi	(South Korea) Choi Sol-gyu (South Korea) Kim Won-ho	(South Korea) Baek Ha-na (South Korea) Lee So-hee	(China) Feng Yanzhe (China) Huang Dongping
Swiss Open	Report	(Japan) Koki Watanabe	(Thailand) Pornpawee Chochuwong	(India) Satwiksairaj Rankireddy (India) Chirag Shetty	(Japan) Rena Miyaura (Japan) Ayako Sakuramoto	(China) Jiang Zhenbang (China) Wei Yaxin
Spain Masters	Report	(Japan) Kenta Nishimoto	(Indonesia) Gregoria Mariska Tunjung	(China) He Jiting (China) Zhou Haodong	(China) Liu Shengshu (China) Tan Ning	(Denmark) Mathias Christiansen (Denmark) Alexandra Bøje
Orléans Masters	Report	(India) Priyanshu Rajawat	(Spain) Carolina Marín	(China) Chen Boyang (China) Liu Yi	(Japan) Rena Miyaura (Japan) Ayako Sakuramoto	(Malaysia) Chen Tang Jie (Malaysia) Toh Ee Wei
Taipei Open	Report	(Indonesia) Chico Aura Dwi Wardoyo	(Chinese Taipei) Tai Tzu-ying	(Malaysia) Man Wei Chong (Malaysia) Tee Kai Wun	(South Korea) Lee Yu-lim (South Korea) Shin Seung-chan	(Malaysia) Chen Tang Jie (Malaysia) Toh Ee Wei
U.S. Open	Report	(China) Li Shifeng	(Thailand) Supanida Katethong	(Malaysia) Goh Sze Fei (Malaysia) Nur Izzuddin	(China) Liu Shengshu (China) Tan Ning	(Chinese Taipei) Ye Hong-wei (Chinese Taipei) Lee Chia-hsin
New Zealand Open	Report	Cancelled				
Hylo Open	Report	(Chinese Taipei) Chou Tien-chen	(United States) Beiwen Zhang	(China) Liu Yuchen (China) Ou Xuanyi	(China) Zhang Shuxian (China) Zheng Yu	(Hong Kong) Tang Chun Man (Hong Kong) Tse Ying Suet
Korea Masters	Report	(Japan) Kento Momota	(South Korea) Kim Ga-eun	(Chinese Taipei) Lee Jhe-huei (Chinese Taipei) Yang Po-hsuan	(South Korea) Jeong Na-eun (South Korea) Kim Hye-jeong	(South Korea) Seo Seung-jae (South Korea) Chae Yoo-jung
Syed Modi International	Report	(Chinese Taipei) Chi Yu-jen	(Japan) Nozomi Okuhara	(Malaysia) Choong Hon Jian (Malaysia) Muhammad Haikal	(Japan) Rin Iwanaga (Japan) Kie Nakanishi	(Indonesia) Dejan Ferdinansyah (Indonesia) Gloria Emanuelle Widjaja
Super 100
Ruichang China Masters	Report	(China) Sun Feixiang	(Chinese Taipei) Lin Hsiang-ti	(China) Chen Boyang (China) Liu Yi	(China) Chen Xiaofei (China) Feng Xueying	(China) Jiang Zhenbang (China) Wei Yaxin
Indonesia Masters Super 100 I	Report	(India) Kiran George	(Indonesia) Ester Nurumi Tri Wardoyo	(Indonesia) Sabar Karyaman Gutama (Indonesia) Muhammad Reza Pahlevi Isfahani	(Indonesia) Lanny Tria Mayasari (Indonesia) Ribka Sugiarto	(Malaysia) Yap Roy King (Malaysia) Valeree Siow
Vietnam Open	Report	(Chinese Taipei) Huang Yu-kai	(Vietnam) Nguyễn Thùy Linh	(Japan) Kenya Mitsuhashi (Japan) Hiroki Okamura	(Chinese Taipei) Hsieh Pei-shan (Chinese Taipei) Tseng Yu-chi	(Japan) Hiroki Nishi (Japan) Akari Sato
Kaohsiung Masters	Report	(Chinese Taipei) Lin Chun-yi	(Chinese Taipei) Liang Ting-yu	(Malaysia) Goh Sze Fei (Malaysia) Nur Izzuddin	(Australia) Setyana Mapasa (Australia) Angela Yu	(Japan) Hiroki Nishi (Japan) Akari Sato
Abu Dhabi Masters	Report	(Denmark) Mads Christophersen	(India) Unnati Hooda	(Malaysia) Goh Sze Fei (Malaysia) Nur Izzuddin	(India) Tanisha Crasto (India) Ashwini Ponnappa	(Denmark) Mads Vestergaard (Denmark) Christine Busch
Indonesia Masters Super 100 II	Report	(Japan) Takuma Obayashi	(Japan) Tomoka Miyazaki	(Japan) Kenya Mitsuhashi (Japan) Hiroki Okamura	(Indonesia) Lanny Tria Mayasari (Indonesia) Ribka Sugiarto	(Indonesia) Jafar Hidayatullah (Indonesia) Aisyah Salsabila Putri Pranata
Malaysia Super 100	Report	(Malaysia) Leong Jun Hao	(Thailand) Pitchamon Opatniputh	(Chinese Taipei) Chen Cheng-kuan (Chinese Taipei) Chen Sheng-fa	(Thailand) Laksika Kanlaha (Thailand) Phataimas Muenwong	(Malaysia) Chan Peng Soon (Malaysia) Cheah Yee See
Guwahati Masters	Report	(Indonesia) Yohanes Saut Marcellyno	(Thailand) Lalinrat Chaiwan	(Malaysia) Choong Hon Jian (Malaysia) Muhammad Haikal	(India) Tanisha Crasto (India) Ashwini Ponnappa	(Singapore) Terry Hee (Singapore) Jessica Tan
Odisha Masters	Report	(India) Sathish Kumar Karunakaran	(Japan) Nozomi Okuhara	(Chinese Taipei) Lin Bing-wei (Chinese Taipei) Su Ching-heng	(Indonesia) Meilysa Trias Puspita Sari (Indonesia) Rachel Allessya Rose	(India) Dhruv Kapila (India) Tanisha Crasto

== Finals ==
This is the complete schedule of events on the 2023 calendar, with the champions and runners-up documented.

=== January ===
Date	Tournament	Champions	Runners-up
10–15 January	Malaysia Open (Draw): Host: Kuala Lumpur, Malaysia; Venue: Axiata Arena; Level: Super 1000; Prize: $1,250,000; Format: 32MS/32WS/32MD/32WD/32XD	(Denmark) Viktor Axelsen	(Japan) Kodai Naraoka
10–15 January	Malaysia Open (Draw): Host: Kuala Lumpur, Malaysia; Venue: Axiata Arena; Level: Super 1000; Prize: $1,250,000; Format: 32MS/32WS/32MD/32WD/32XD	Score: 21–6, 21–15	
10–15 January	Malaysia Open (Draw): Host: Kuala Lumpur, Malaysia; Venue: Axiata Arena; Level: Super 1000; Prize: $1,250,000; Format: 32MS/32WS/32MD/32WD/32XD	(Japan) Akane Yamaguchi	(South Korea) An Se-young
10–15 January	Malaysia Open (Draw): Host: Kuala Lumpur, Malaysia; Venue: Axiata Arena; Level: Super 1000; Prize: $1,250,000; Format: 32MS/32WS/32MD/32WD/32XD	Score: 12–21, 21–19, 21–11	
10–15 January	Malaysia Open (Draw): Host: Kuala Lumpur, Malaysia; Venue: Axiata Arena; Level: Super 1000; Prize: $1,250,000; Format: 32MS/32WS/32MD/32WD/32XD	(Indonesia) Fajar Alfian (Indonesia) Muhammad Rian Ardianto	(China) Liang Weikeng (China) Wang Chang
10–15 January	Malaysia Open (Draw): Host: Kuala Lumpur, Malaysia; Venue: Axiata Arena; Level: Super 1000; Prize: $1,250,000; Format: 32MS/32WS/32MD/32WD/32XD	Score: 21–18, 18–21, 21–13	
10–15 January	Malaysia Open (Draw): Host: Kuala Lumpur, Malaysia; Venue: Axiata Arena; Level: Super 1000; Prize: $1,250,000; Format: 32MS/32WS/32MD/32WD/32XD	(China) Chen Qingchen (China) Jia Yifan	(South Korea) Baek Ha-na (South Korea) Lee Yu-lim
10–15 January	Malaysia Open (Draw): Host: Kuala Lumpur, Malaysia; Venue: Axiata Arena; Level: Super 1000; Prize: $1,250,000; Format: 32MS/32WS/32MD/32WD/32XD	Score: 21–16, 21–10	
10–15 January	Malaysia Open (Draw): Host: Kuala Lumpur, Malaysia; Venue: Axiata Arena; Level: Super 1000; Prize: $1,250,000; Format: 32MS/32WS/32MD/32WD/32XD	(China) Zheng Siwei (China) Huang Yaqiong	(Japan) Yuta Watanabe (Japan) Arisa Higashino
10–15 January	Malaysia Open (Draw): Host: Kuala Lumpur, Malaysia; Venue: Axiata Arena; Level: Super 1000; Prize: $1,250,000; Format: 32MS/32WS/32MD/32WD/32XD	Score: 21–19, 21–11	
17–22 January	India Open (Draw): Host: New Delhi, India; Venue: K. D. Jadhav Indoor Stadium; Level: Super 750; Prize: $850,000; Format: 32MS/32WS/32MD/32WD/32XD	(Thailand) Kunlavut Vitidsarn	(Denmark) Viktor Axelsen
17–22 January	India Open (Draw): Host: New Delhi, India; Venue: K. D. Jadhav Indoor Stadium; Level: Super 750; Prize: $850,000; Format: 32MS/32WS/32MD/32WD/32XD	Score: 22–20, 10–21, 21–12	
17–22 January	India Open (Draw): Host: New Delhi, India; Venue: K. D. Jadhav Indoor Stadium; Level: Super 750; Prize: $850,000; Format: 32MS/32WS/32MD/32WD/32XD	(South Korea) An Se-young	(Japan) Akane Yamaguchi
17–22 January	India Open (Draw): Host: New Delhi, India; Venue: K. D. Jadhav Indoor Stadium; Level: Super 750; Prize: $850,000; Format: 32MS/32WS/32MD/32WD/32XD	Score: 15–21, 21–16, 21–12	
17–22 January	India Open (Draw): Host: New Delhi, India; Venue: K. D. Jadhav Indoor Stadium; Level: Super 750; Prize: $850,000; Format: 32MS/32WS/32MD/32WD/32XD	(China) Liang Weikeng (China) Wang Chang	(Malaysia) Aaron Chia (Malaysia) Soh Wooi Yik
17–22 January	India Open (Draw): Host: New Delhi, India; Venue: K. D. Jadhav Indoor Stadium; Level: Super 750; Prize: $850,000; Format: 32MS/32WS/32MD/32WD/32XD	Score: 14–21, 21–19, 21–18	
17–22 January	India Open (Draw): Host: New Delhi, India; Venue: K. D. Jadhav Indoor Stadium; Level: Super 750; Prize: $850,000; Format: 32MS/32WS/32MD/32WD/32XD	(Japan) Nami Matsuyama (Japan) Chiharu Shida	(China) Chen Qingchen (China) Jia Yifan
17–22 January	India Open (Draw): Host: New Delhi, India; Venue: K. D. Jadhav Indoor Stadium; Level: Super 750; Prize: $850,000; Format: 32MS/32WS/32MD/32WD/32XD	Score: Walkover	
17–22 January	India Open (Draw): Host: New Delhi, India; Venue: K. D. Jadhav Indoor Stadium; Level: Super 750; Prize: $850,000; Format: 32MS/32WS/32MD/32WD/32XD	(Japan) Yuta Watanabe (Japan) Arisa Higashino	(China) Wang Yilyu (China) Huang Dongping
17–22 January	India Open (Draw): Host: New Delhi, India; Venue: K. D. Jadhav Indoor Stadium; Level: Super 750; Prize: $850,000; Format: 32MS/32WS/32MD/32WD/32XD	Score: Walkover	
24–29 January	Indonesia Masters (Draw): Host: Jakarta, Indonesia; Venue: Istora Gelora Bung Karno; Level: Super 500; Prize: $420,000; Format: 32MS/32WS/32MD/32WD/32XD	(Indonesia) Jonatan Christie	(Indonesia) Chico Aura Dwi Wardoyo
24–29 January	Indonesia Masters (Draw): Host: Jakarta, Indonesia; Venue: Istora Gelora Bung Karno; Level: Super 500; Prize: $420,000; Format: 32MS/32WS/32MD/32WD/32XD	Score: 21–15, 21–13	
24–29 January	Indonesia Masters (Draw): Host: Jakarta, Indonesia; Venue: Istora Gelora Bung Karno; Level: Super 500; Prize: $420,000; Format: 32MS/32WS/32MD/32WD/32XD	(South Korea) An Se-young	(Spain) Carolina Marín
24–29 January	Indonesia Masters (Draw): Host: Jakarta, Indonesia; Venue: Istora Gelora Bung Karno; Level: Super 500; Prize: $420,000; Format: 32MS/32WS/32MD/32WD/32XD	Score: 18–21, 21–18, 21–13	
24–29 January	Indonesia Masters (Draw): Host: Jakarta, Indonesia; Venue: Istora Gelora Bung Karno; Level: Super 500; Prize: $420,000; Format: 32MS/32WS/32MD/32WD/32XD	(Indonesia) Leo Rolly Carnando (Indonesia) Daniel Marthin	(China) He Jiting (China) Zhou Haodong
24–29 January	Indonesia Masters (Draw): Host: Jakarta, Indonesia; Venue: Istora Gelora Bung Karno; Level: Super 500; Prize: $420,000; Format: 32MS/32WS/32MD/32WD/32XD	Score: 21–17, 21–16	
24–29 January	Indonesia Masters (Draw): Host: Jakarta, Indonesia; Venue: Istora Gelora Bung Karno; Level: Super 500; Prize: $420,000; Format: 32MS/32WS/32MD/32WD/32XD	(China) Liu Shengshu (China) Zhang Shuxian	(Japan) Yuki Fukushima (Japan) Sayaka Hirota
24–29 January	Indonesia Masters (Draw): Host: Jakarta, Indonesia; Venue: Istora Gelora Bung Karno; Level: Super 500; Prize: $420,000; Format: 32MS/32WS/32MD/32WD/32XD	Score: 22–20, 21–19	
24–29 January	Indonesia Masters (Draw): Host: Jakarta, Indonesia; Venue: Istora Gelora Bung Karno; Level: Super 500; Prize: $420,000; Format: 32MS/32WS/32MD/32WD/32XD	(China) Feng Yanzhe (China) Huang Dongping	(China) Jiang Zhenbang (China) Wei Yaxin
24–29 January	Indonesia Masters (Draw): Host: Jakarta, Indonesia; Venue: Istora Gelora Bung Karno; Level: Super 500; Prize: $420,000; Format: 32MS/32WS/32MD/32WD/32XD	Score: 21–15, 16–21, 21–19	
31 January – 5 February	Thailand Masters (Draw): Host: Bangkok, Thailand; Venue: Nimibutr Stadium; Level: Super 300; Prize: $210,000; Format: 32MS/32WS/32MD/32WD/32XD	(Chinese Taipei) Lin Chun-yi	(Hong Kong) Ng Ka Long
31 January – 5 February	Thailand Masters (Draw): Host: Bangkok, Thailand; Venue: Nimibutr Stadium; Level: Super 300; Prize: $210,000; Format: 32MS/32WS/32MD/32WD/32XD	Score: 21–17, 21–14	
31 January – 5 February	Thailand Masters (Draw): Host: Bangkok, Thailand; Venue: Nimibutr Stadium; Level: Super 300; Prize: $210,000; Format: 32MS/32WS/32MD/32WD/32XD	(China) Zhang Yiman	(China) Han Yue
31 January – 5 February	Thailand Masters (Draw): Host: Bangkok, Thailand; Venue: Nimibutr Stadium; Level: Super 300; Prize: $210,000; Format: 32MS/32WS/32MD/32WD/32XD	Score: 15–21, 21–13, 21–18	
31 January – 5 February	Thailand Masters (Draw): Host: Bangkok, Thailand; Venue: Nimibutr Stadium; Level: Super 300; Prize: $210,000; Format: 32MS/32WS/32MD/32WD/32XD	(Indonesia) Leo Rolly Carnando (Indonesia) Daniel Marthin	(Chinese Taipei) Su Ching-heng (Chinese Taipei) Ye Hong-wei
31 January – 5 February	Thailand Masters (Draw): Host: Bangkok, Thailand; Venue: Nimibutr Stadium; Level: Super 300; Prize: $210,000; Format: 32MS/32WS/32MD/32WD/32XD	Score: 21–16, 21–17	
31 January – 5 February	Thailand Masters (Draw): Host: Bangkok, Thailand; Venue: Nimibutr Stadium; Level: Super 300; Prize: $210,000; Format: 32MS/32WS/32MD/32WD/32XD	(Thailand) Benyapa Aimsaard (Thailand) Nuntakarn Aimsaard	(South Korea) Baek Ha-na (South Korea) Lee So-hee
31 January – 5 February	Thailand Masters (Draw): Host: Bangkok, Thailand; Venue: Nimibutr Stadium; Level: Super 300; Prize: $210,000; Format: 32MS/32WS/32MD/32WD/32XD	Score: 21–6, 21–11	
31 January – 5 February	Thailand Masters (Draw): Host: Bangkok, Thailand; Venue: Nimibutr Stadium; Level: Super 300; Prize: $210,000; Format: 32MS/32WS/32MD/32WD/32XD	(China) Feng Yanzhe (China) Huang Dongping	(South Korea) Seo Seung-jae (South Korea) Chae Yoo-jung
31 January – 5 February	Thailand Masters (Draw): Host: Bangkok, Thailand; Venue: Nimibutr Stadium; Level: Super 300; Prize: $210,000; Format: 32MS/32WS/32MD/32WD/32XD	Score: 18–21, 21–15, 21–12	

=== February ===
No World Tour tournaments held in February.

=== March ===
Date	Tournament	Champions	Runners-up
7–12 March	German Open (Draw): Host: Mülheim, Germany; Venue: Westenergie Sporthalle; Level: Super 300; Prize: $210,000; Format: 32MS/32WS/32MD/32WD/32XD	(Hong Kong) Ng Ka Long	(China) Li Shifeng
7–12 March	German Open (Draw): Host: Mülheim, Germany; Venue: Westenergie Sporthalle; Level: Super 300; Prize: $210,000; Format: 32MS/32WS/32MD/32WD/32XD	Score: 20–22, 21–18, 21–18	
7–12 March	German Open (Draw): Host: Mülheim, Germany; Venue: Westenergie Sporthalle; Level: Super 300; Prize: $210,000; Format: 32MS/32WS/32MD/32WD/32XD	(Japan) Akane Yamaguchi	(South Korea) An Se-young
7–12 March	German Open (Draw): Host: Mülheim, Germany; Venue: Westenergie Sporthalle; Level: Super 300; Prize: $210,000; Format: 32MS/32WS/32MD/32WD/32XD	Score: 21–11, 21–14	
7–12 March	German Open (Draw): Host: Mülheim, Germany; Venue: Westenergie Sporthalle; Level: Super 300; Prize: $210,000; Format: 32MS/32WS/32MD/32WD/32XD	(South Korea) Choi Sol-gyu (South Korea) Kim Won-ho	(South Korea) Kang Min-hyuk (South Korea) Seo Seung-jae
7–12 March	German Open (Draw): Host: Mülheim, Germany; Venue: Westenergie Sporthalle; Level: Super 300; Prize: $210,000; Format: 32MS/32WS/32MD/32WD/32XD	Score: 21–19, 18–21, 21–19	
7–12 March	German Open (Draw): Host: Mülheim, Germany; Venue: Westenergie Sporthalle; Level: Super 300; Prize: $210,000; Format: 32MS/32WS/32MD/32WD/32XD	(South Korea) Baek Ha-na (South Korea) Lee So-hee	(Japan) Nami Matsuyama (Japan) Chiharu Shida
7–12 March	German Open (Draw): Host: Mülheim, Germany; Venue: Westenergie Sporthalle; Level: Super 300; Prize: $210,000; Format: 32MS/32WS/32MD/32WD/32XD	Score: 21–19, 21–15	
7–12 March	German Open (Draw): Host: Mülheim, Germany; Venue: Westenergie Sporthalle; Level: Super 300; Prize: $210,000; Format: 32MS/32WS/32MD/32WD/32XD	(China) Feng Yanzhe (China) Huang Dongping	(South Korea) Kim Won-ho (South Korea) Jeong Na-eun
7–12 March	German Open (Draw): Host: Mülheim, Germany; Venue: Westenergie Sporthalle; Level: Super 300; Prize: $210,000; Format: 32MS/32WS/32MD/32WD/32XD	Score: 21–4, 21–15	
14–19 March	All England Open (Draw): Host: Birmingham, England; Venue: Utilita Arena Birmingham; Level: Super 1000; Prize: $1,250,000; Format: 32MS/32WS/32MD/32WD/32XD	(China) Li Shifeng	(China) Shi Yuqi
14–19 March	All England Open (Draw): Host: Birmingham, England; Venue: Utilita Arena Birmingham; Level: Super 1000; Prize: $1,250,000; Format: 32MS/32WS/32MD/32WD/32XD	Score: 26–24, 21–5	
14–19 March	All England Open (Draw): Host: Birmingham, England; Venue: Utilita Arena Birmingham; Level: Super 1000; Prize: $1,250,000; Format: 32MS/32WS/32MD/32WD/32XD	(South Korea) An Se-young	(China) Chen Yufei
14–19 March	All England Open (Draw): Host: Birmingham, England; Venue: Utilita Arena Birmingham; Level: Super 1000; Prize: $1,250,000; Format: 32MS/32WS/32MD/32WD/32XD	Score: 21–17, 10–21, 21–19	
14–19 March	All England Open (Draw): Host: Birmingham, England; Venue: Utilita Arena Birmingham; Level: Super 1000; Prize: $1,250,000; Format: 32MS/32WS/32MD/32WD/32XD	(Indonesia) Fajar Alfian (Indonesia) Muhammad Rian Ardianto	(Indonesia) Mohammad Ahsan (Indonesia) Hendra Setiawan
14–19 March	All England Open (Draw): Host: Birmingham, England; Venue: Utilita Arena Birmingham; Level: Super 1000; Prize: $1,250,000; Format: 32MS/32WS/32MD/32WD/32XD	Score: 21–17, 21–14	
14–19 March	All England Open (Draw): Host: Birmingham, England; Venue: Utilita Arena Birmingham; Level: Super 1000; Prize: $1,250,000; Format: 32MS/32WS/32MD/32WD/32XD	(South Korea) Kim So-yeong (South Korea) Kong Hee-yong	(South Korea) Baek Ha-na (South Korea) Lee So-hee
14–19 March	All England Open (Draw): Host: Birmingham, England; Venue: Utilita Arena Birmingham; Level: Super 1000; Prize: $1,250,000; Format: 32MS/32WS/32MD/32WD/32XD	Score: 21–5, 21–12	
14–19 March	All England Open (Draw): Host: Birmingham, England; Venue: Utilita Arena Birmingham; Level: Super 1000; Prize: $1,250,000; Format: 32MS/32WS/32MD/32WD/32XD	(China) Zheng Siwei (China) Huang Yaqiong	(South Korea) Seo Seung-jae (South Korea) Chae Yoo-jung
14–19 March	All England Open (Draw): Host: Birmingham, England; Venue: Utilita Arena Birmingham; Level: Super 1000; Prize: $1,250,000; Format: 32MS/32WS/32MD/32WD/32XD	Score: 21–16, 16–21, 21–12	
14–19 March	Ruichang China Masters (Draw): Host: Ruichang, China; Venue: Ruichang Sports Park Gym; Level: Super 100; Prize: $120,000; Format: 48MS/32WS/32MD/32WD/32XD	(China) Sun Feixiang	(China) Sun Chao
14–19 March	Ruichang China Masters (Draw): Host: Ruichang, China; Venue: Ruichang Sports Park Gym; Level: Super 100; Prize: $120,000; Format: 48MS/32WS/32MD/32WD/32XD	Score: 21–15, 21–14	
14–19 March	Ruichang China Masters (Draw): Host: Ruichang, China; Venue: Ruichang Sports Park Gym; Level: Super 100; Prize: $120,000; Format: 48MS/32WS/32MD/32WD/32XD	(Chinese Taipei) Lin Hsiang-ti	(China) Chen Lu
14–19 March	Ruichang China Masters (Draw): Host: Ruichang, China; Venue: Ruichang Sports Park Gym; Level: Super 100; Prize: $120,000; Format: 48MS/32WS/32MD/32WD/32XD	Score: 13–21, 21–11, 22–20	
14–19 March	Ruichang China Masters (Draw): Host: Ruichang, China; Venue: Ruichang Sports Park Gym; Level: Super 100; Prize: $120,000; Format: 48MS/32WS/32MD/32WD/32XD	(China) Chen Boyang (China) Liu Yi	(Malaysia) Nur Izzuddin (Malaysia) Muhammad Haikal
14–19 March	Ruichang China Masters (Draw): Host: Ruichang, China; Venue: Ruichang Sports Park Gym; Level: Super 100; Prize: $120,000; Format: 48MS/32WS/32MD/32WD/32XD	Score: 21–16, 19–21, 23–21	
14–19 March	Ruichang China Masters (Draw): Host: Ruichang, China; Venue: Ruichang Sports Park Gym; Level: Super 100; Prize: $120,000; Format: 48MS/32WS/32MD/32WD/32XD	(China) Chen Xiaofei (China) Feng Xueying	(China) Keng Shuliang (China) Zhang Chi
14–19 March	Ruichang China Masters (Draw): Host: Ruichang, China; Venue: Ruichang Sports Park Gym; Level: Super 100; Prize: $120,000; Format: 48MS/32WS/32MD/32WD/32XD	Score: 21–15, 21–19	
14–19 March	Ruichang China Masters (Draw): Host: Ruichang, China; Venue: Ruichang Sports Park Gym; Level: Super 100; Prize: $120,000; Format: 48MS/32WS/32MD/32WD/32XD	(China) Jiang Zhenbang (China) Wei Yaxin	(China) Cheng Xing (China) Chen Fanghui
14–19 March	Ruichang China Masters (Draw): Host: Ruichang, China; Venue: Ruichang Sports Park Gym; Level: Super 100; Prize: $120,000; Format: 48MS/32WS/32MD/32WD/32XD	Score: 21–15, 21–8	
21–26 March	Swiss Open (Draw): Host: Basel, Switzerland; Venue: St. Jakobshalle; Level: Super 300; Prize: $210,000; Format: 32MS/32WS/32MD/32WD/32XD	(Japan) Koki Watanabe	(Chinese Taipei) Chou Tien-chen
21–26 March	Swiss Open (Draw): Host: Basel, Switzerland; Venue: St. Jakobshalle; Level: Super 300; Prize: $210,000; Format: 32MS/32WS/32MD/32WD/32XD	Score: 22–20, 18–21, 21–12	
21–26 March	Swiss Open (Draw): Host: Basel, Switzerland; Venue: St. Jakobshalle; Level: Super 300; Prize: $210,000; Format: 32MS/32WS/32MD/32WD/32XD	(Thailand) Pornpawee Chochuwong	(Denmark) Mia Blichfeldt
21–26 March	Swiss Open (Draw): Host: Basel, Switzerland; Venue: St. Jakobshalle; Level: Super 300; Prize: $210,000; Format: 32MS/32WS/32MD/32WD/32XD	Score: 21–16, 21–18	
21–26 March	Swiss Open (Draw): Host: Basel, Switzerland; Venue: St. Jakobshalle; Level: Super 300; Prize: $210,000; Format: 32MS/32WS/32MD/32WD/32XD	(India) Satwiksairaj Rankireddy (India) Chirag Shetty	(China) Ren Xiangyu (China) Tan Qiang
21–26 March	Swiss Open (Draw): Host: Basel, Switzerland; Venue: St. Jakobshalle; Level: Super 300; Prize: $210,000; Format: 32MS/32WS/32MD/32WD/32XD	Score: 21–19, 24–22	
21–26 March	Swiss Open (Draw): Host: Basel, Switzerland; Venue: St. Jakobshalle; Level: Super 300; Prize: $210,000; Format: 32MS/32WS/32MD/32WD/32XD	(Japan) Rena Miyaura (Japan) Ayako Sakuramoto	(Japan) Yuki Fukushima (Japan) Sayaka Hirota
21–26 March	Swiss Open (Draw): Host: Basel, Switzerland; Venue: St. Jakobshalle; Level: Super 300; Prize: $210,000; Format: 32MS/32WS/32MD/32WD/32XD	Score: Walkover	
21–26 March	Swiss Open (Draw): Host: Basel, Switzerland; Venue: St. Jakobshalle; Level: Super 300; Prize: $210,000; Format: 32MS/32WS/32MD/32WD/32XD	(China) Jiang Zhenbang (China) Wei Yaxin	(Malaysia) Goh Soon Huat (Malaysia) Shevon Jemie Lai
21–26 March	Swiss Open (Draw): Host: Basel, Switzerland; Venue: St. Jakobshalle; Level: Super 300; Prize: $210,000; Format: 32MS/32WS/32MD/32WD/32XD	Score: 21–17, 19–21, 21–17	
28 March – 2 April	Spain Masters (Draw): Host: Madrid, Spain; Venue: Centro Deportivo Municipal Gallur; Level: Super 300; Prize: $210,000; Format: 32MS/32WS/32MD/32WD/32XD	(Japan) Kenta Nishimoto	(Japan) Kanta Tsuneyama
28 March – 2 April	Spain Masters (Draw): Host: Madrid, Spain; Venue: Centro Deportivo Municipal Gallur; Level: Super 300; Prize: $210,000; Format: 32MS/32WS/32MD/32WD/32XD	Score: 15–21, 21–18, 21–19	
28 March – 2 April	Spain Masters (Draw): Host: Madrid, Spain; Venue: Centro Deportivo Municipal Gallur; Level: Super 300; Prize: $210,000; Format: 32MS/32WS/32MD/32WD/32XD	(Indonesia) Gregoria Mariska Tunjung	(India) P. V. Sindhu
28 March – 2 April	Spain Masters (Draw): Host: Madrid, Spain; Venue: Centro Deportivo Municipal Gallur; Level: Super 300; Prize: $210,000; Format: 32MS/32WS/32MD/32WD/32XD	Score: 21–8, 21–8	
28 March – 2 April	Spain Masters (Draw): Host: Madrid, Spain; Venue: Centro Deportivo Municipal Gallur; Level: Super 300; Prize: $210,000; Format: 32MS/32WS/32MD/32WD/32XD	(China) He Jiting (China) Zhou Haodong	(Chinese Taipei) Lee Fang-chih (Chinese Taipei) Lee Fang-jen
28 March – 2 April	Spain Masters (Draw): Host: Madrid, Spain; Venue: Centro Deportivo Municipal Gallur; Level: Super 300; Prize: $210,000; Format: 32MS/32WS/32MD/32WD/32XD	Score: 21–5, 21–12	
28 March – 2 April	Spain Masters (Draw): Host: Madrid, Spain; Venue: Centro Deportivo Municipal Gallur; Level: Super 300; Prize: $210,000; Format: 32MS/32WS/32MD/32WD/32XD	(China) Liu Shengshu (China) Tan Ning	(China) Chen Fanghui (China) Du Yue
28 March – 2 April	Spain Masters (Draw): Host: Madrid, Spain; Venue: Centro Deportivo Municipal Gallur; Level: Super 300; Prize: $210,000; Format: 32MS/32WS/32MD/32WD/32XD	Score: 21–8, 16–21, 21–18	
28 March – 2 April	Spain Masters (Draw): Host: Madrid, Spain; Venue: Centro Deportivo Municipal Gallur; Level: Super 300; Prize: $210,000; Format: 32MS/32WS/32MD/32WD/32XD	(Denmark) Mathias Christiansen (Denmark) Alexandra Bøje	(Indonesia) Praveen Jordan (Indonesia) Melati Daeva Oktavianti
28 March – 2 April	Spain Masters (Draw): Host: Madrid, Spain; Venue: Centro Deportivo Municipal Gallur; Level: Super 300; Prize: $210,000; Format: 32MS/32WS/32MD/32WD/32XD	Score: 22–20, 21–18	

=== April ===
Date	Tournament	Champions	Runners-up
4–9 April	Orléans Masters (Draw): Host: Orléans, France; Venue: Palais des Sports; Level: Super 300; Prize: $240,000; Format: 32MS/32WS/32MD/32WD/32XD	(India) Priyanshu Rajawat	(Denmark) Magnus Johannesen
4–9 April	Orléans Masters (Draw): Host: Orléans, France; Venue: Palais des Sports; Level: Super 300; Prize: $240,000; Format: 32MS/32WS/32MD/32WD/32XD	Score: 21–15, 19–21, 21–16	
4–9 April	Orléans Masters (Draw): Host: Orléans, France; Venue: Palais des Sports; Level: Super 300; Prize: $240,000; Format: 32MS/32WS/32MD/32WD/32XD	(Spain) Carolina Marín	(United States) Beiwen Zhang
4–9 April	Orléans Masters (Draw): Host: Orléans, France; Venue: Palais des Sports; Level: Super 300; Prize: $240,000; Format: 32MS/32WS/32MD/32WD/32XD	Score: 25–23, 9–21, 21–10	
4–9 April	Orléans Masters (Draw): Host: Orléans, France; Venue: Palais des Sports; Level: Super 300; Prize: $240,000; Format: 32MS/32WS/32MD/32WD/32XD	(China) Chen Boyang (China) Liu Yi	(Indonesia) Muhammad Shohibul Fikri (Indonesia) Bagas Maulana
4–9 April	Orléans Masters (Draw): Host: Orléans, France; Venue: Palais des Sports; Level: Super 300; Prize: $240,000; Format: 32MS/32WS/32MD/32WD/32XD	Score: 21–19, 21–17	
4–9 April	Orléans Masters (Draw): Host: Orléans, France; Venue: Palais des Sports; Level: Super 300; Prize: $240,000; Format: 32MS/32WS/32MD/32WD/32XD	(Japan) Rena Miyaura (Japan) Ayako Sakuramoto	(China) Liu Shengshu (China) Tan Ning
4–9 April	Orléans Masters (Draw): Host: Orléans, France; Venue: Palais des Sports; Level: Super 300; Prize: $240,000; Format: 32MS/32WS/32MD/32WD/32XD	Score: 21–19, 16–21, 21–12	
4–9 April	Orléans Masters (Draw): Host: Orléans, France; Venue: Palais des Sports; Level: Super 300; Prize: $240,000; Format: 32MS/32WS/32MD/32WD/32XD	(Malaysia) Chen Tang Jie (Malaysia) Toh Ee Wei	(Chinese Taipei) Ye Hong-wei (Chinese Taipei) Lee Chia-hsin
4–9 April	Orléans Masters (Draw): Host: Orléans, France; Venue: Palais des Sports; Level: Super 300; Prize: $240,000; Format: 32MS/32WS/32MD/32WD/32XD	Score: 21–19, 21–17	

=== May ===
Date	Tournament	Champions	Runners-up
23–28 May	Malaysia Masters (Draw): Host: Kuala Lumpur, Malaysia; Venue: Axiata Arena; Level: Super 500; Prize: $420,000; Format: 32MS/32WS/32MD/32WD/32XD	(India) Prannoy H. S.	(China) Weng Hongyang
23–28 May	Malaysia Masters (Draw): Host: Kuala Lumpur, Malaysia; Venue: Axiata Arena; Level: Super 500; Prize: $420,000; Format: 32MS/32WS/32MD/32WD/32XD	Score: 21–19, 13–21, 21–18	
23–28 May	Malaysia Masters (Draw): Host: Kuala Lumpur, Malaysia; Venue: Axiata Arena; Level: Super 500; Prize: $420,000; Format: 32MS/32WS/32MD/32WD/32XD	(Japan) Akane Yamaguchi	(Indonesia) Gregoria Mariska Tunjung
23–28 May	Malaysia Masters (Draw): Host: Kuala Lumpur, Malaysia; Venue: Axiata Arena; Level: Super 500; Prize: $420,000; Format: 32MS/32WS/32MD/32WD/32XD	Score: 21–17, 21–7	
23–28 May	Malaysia Masters (Draw): Host: Kuala Lumpur, Malaysia; Venue: Axiata Arena; Level: Super 500; Prize: $420,000; Format: 32MS/32WS/32MD/32WD/32XD	(South Korea) Kang Min-hyuk (South Korea) Seo Seung-jae	(Malaysia) Man Wei Chong (Malaysia) Tee Kai Wun
23–28 May	Malaysia Masters (Draw): Host: Kuala Lumpur, Malaysia; Venue: Axiata Arena; Level: Super 500; Prize: $420,000; Format: 32MS/32WS/32MD/32WD/32XD	Score: 21–15, 22–24, 21–19	
23–28 May	Malaysia Masters (Draw): Host: Kuala Lumpur, Malaysia; Venue: Axiata Arena; Level: Super 500; Prize: $420,000; Format: 32MS/32WS/32MD/32WD/32XD	(South Korea) Baek Ha-na (South Korea) Lee So-hee	(Malaysia) Pearly Tan (Malaysia) Thinaah Muralitharan
23–28 May	Malaysia Masters (Draw): Host: Kuala Lumpur, Malaysia; Venue: Axiata Arena; Level: Super 500; Prize: $420,000; Format: 32MS/32WS/32MD/32WD/32XD	Score: 22–20, 8–21, 21–17	
23–28 May	Malaysia Masters (Draw): Host: Kuala Lumpur, Malaysia; Venue: Axiata Arena; Level: Super 500; Prize: $420,000; Format: 32MS/32WS/32MD/32WD/32XD	(Thailand) Dechapol Puavaranukroh (Thailand) Sapsiree Taerattanachai	(China) Feng Yanzhe (China) Huang Dongping
23–28 May	Malaysia Masters (Draw): Host: Kuala Lumpur, Malaysia; Venue: Axiata Arena; Level: Super 500; Prize: $420,000; Format: 32MS/32WS/32MD/32WD/32XD	Score: 16–21, 21–13, 21–18	
30 May – 4 June	Thailand Open (Draw): Host: Bangkok, Thailand; Venue: Indoor Stadium Huamark; Level: Super 500; Prize: $420,000; Format: 32MS/32WS/32MD/32WD/32XD	(Thailand) Kunlavut Vitidsarn	(Hong Kong) Lee Cheuk Yiu
30 May – 4 June	Thailand Open (Draw): Host: Bangkok, Thailand; Venue: Indoor Stadium Huamark; Level: Super 500; Prize: $420,000; Format: 32MS/32WS/32MD/32WD/32XD	Score: 21–12, 21–10	
30 May – 4 June	Thailand Open (Draw): Host: Bangkok, Thailand; Venue: Indoor Stadium Huamark; Level: Super 500; Prize: $420,000; Format: 32MS/32WS/32MD/32WD/32XD	(South Korea) An Se-young	(China) He Bingjiao
30 May – 4 June	Thailand Open (Draw): Host: Bangkok, Thailand; Venue: Indoor Stadium Huamark; Level: Super 500; Prize: $420,000; Format: 32MS/32WS/32MD/32WD/32XD	Score: 21–10, 21–19	
30 May – 4 June	Thailand Open (Draw): Host: Bangkok, Thailand; Venue: Indoor Stadium Huamark; Level: Super 500; Prize: $420,000; Format: 32MS/32WS/32MD/32WD/32XD	(China) Liang Weikeng (China) Wang Chang	(Indonesia) Bagas Maulana (Indonesia) Muhammad Shohibul Fikri
30 May – 4 June	Thailand Open (Draw): Host: Bangkok, Thailand; Venue: Indoor Stadium Huamark; Level: Super 500; Prize: $420,000; Format: 32MS/32WS/32MD/32WD/32XD	Score: 21–10, 21–15	
30 May – 4 June	Thailand Open (Draw): Host: Bangkok, Thailand; Venue: Indoor Stadium Huamark; Level: Super 500; Prize: $420,000; Format: 32MS/32WS/32MD/32WD/32XD	(South Korea) Kim So-yeong (South Korea) Kong Hee-yong	(Thailand) Benyapa Aimsaard (Thailand) Nuntakarn Aimsaard
30 May – 4 June	Thailand Open (Draw): Host: Bangkok, Thailand; Venue: Indoor Stadium Huamark; Level: Super 500; Prize: $420,000; Format: 32MS/32WS/32MD/32WD/32XD	Score: 21–13, 21–17	
30 May – 4 June	Thailand Open (Draw): Host: Bangkok, Thailand; Venue: Indoor Stadium Huamark; Level: Super 500; Prize: $420,000; Format: 32MS/32WS/32MD/32WD/32XD	(South Korea) Kim Won-ho (South Korea) Jeong Na-eun	(Thailand) Dechapol Puavaranukroh (Thailand) Sapsiree Taerattanachai
30 May – 4 June	Thailand Open (Draw): Host: Bangkok, Thailand; Venue: Indoor Stadium Huamark; Level: Super 500; Prize: $420,000; Format: 32MS/32WS/32MD/32WD/32XD	Score: 11–21, 21–19, 22–20	

=== June ===
Date	Tournament	Champions	Runners-up
6–11 June	Singapore Open (Draw): Host: Singapore; Venue: Singapore Indoor Stadium; Level: Super 750; Prize: $850,000; Format: 32MS/32WS/32MD/32WD/32XD	(Indonesia) Anthony Sinisuka Ginting	(Denmark) Anders Antonsen
6–11 June	Singapore Open (Draw): Host: Singapore; Venue: Singapore Indoor Stadium; Level: Super 750; Prize: $850,000; Format: 32MS/32WS/32MD/32WD/32XD	Score: 21–16, 21–13	
6–11 June	Singapore Open (Draw): Host: Singapore; Venue: Singapore Indoor Stadium; Level: Super 750; Prize: $850,000; Format: 32MS/32WS/32MD/32WD/32XD	(South Korea) An Se-young	(Japan) Akane Yamaguchi
6–11 June	Singapore Open (Draw): Host: Singapore; Venue: Singapore Indoor Stadium; Level: Super 750; Prize: $850,000; Format: 32MS/32WS/32MD/32WD/32XD	Score: 21–16, 21–14	
6–11 June	Singapore Open (Draw): Host: Singapore; Venue: Singapore Indoor Stadium; Level: Super 750; Prize: $850,000; Format: 32MS/32WS/32MD/32WD/32XD	(Japan) Takuro Hoki (Japan) Yugo Kobayashi	(China) Liang Weikeng (China) Wang Chang
6–11 June	Singapore Open (Draw): Host: Singapore; Venue: Singapore Indoor Stadium; Level: Super 750; Prize: $850,000; Format: 32MS/32WS/32MD/32WD/32XD	Score: 21–13, 21–18	
6–11 June	Singapore Open (Draw): Host: Singapore; Venue: Singapore Indoor Stadium; Level: Super 750; Prize: $850,000; Format: 32MS/32WS/32MD/32WD/32XD	(China) Chen Qingchen (China) Jia Yifan	(South Korea) Baek Ha-na (South Korea) Lee So-hee
6–11 June	Singapore Open (Draw): Host: Singapore; Venue: Singapore Indoor Stadium; Level: Super 750; Prize: $850,000; Format: 32MS/32WS/32MD/32WD/32XD	Score: 21–16, 21–12	
6–11 June	Singapore Open (Draw): Host: Singapore; Venue: Singapore Indoor Stadium; Level: Super 750; Prize: $850,000; Format: 32MS/32WS/32MD/32WD/32XD	(Denmark) Mathias Christiansen (Denmark) Alexandra Bøje	(Japan) Yuta Watanabe (Japan) Arisa Higashino
6–11 June	Singapore Open (Draw): Host: Singapore; Venue: Singapore Indoor Stadium; Level: Super 750; Prize: $850,000; Format: 32MS/32WS/32MD/32WD/32XD	Score: 21–14, 20–22, 21–16	
13–18 June	Indonesia Open (Draw): Host: Jakarta, Indonesia; Venue: Istora Gelora Bung Karno; Level: Super 1000; Prize: $1,250,000; Format: 32MS/32WS/32MD/32WD/32XD	(Denmark) Viktor Axelsen	(Indonesia) Anthony Sinisuka Ginting
13–18 June	Indonesia Open (Draw): Host: Jakarta, Indonesia; Venue: Istora Gelora Bung Karno; Level: Super 1000; Prize: $1,250,000; Format: 32MS/32WS/32MD/32WD/32XD	Score: 21–14, 21–13	
13–18 June	Indonesia Open (Draw): Host: Jakarta, Indonesia; Venue: Istora Gelora Bung Karno; Level: Super 1000; Prize: $1,250,000; Format: 32MS/32WS/32MD/32WD/32XD	(China) Chen Yufei	(Spain) Carolina Marín
13–18 June	Indonesia Open (Draw): Host: Jakarta, Indonesia; Venue: Istora Gelora Bung Karno; Level: Super 1000; Prize: $1,250,000; Format: 32MS/32WS/32MD/32WD/32XD	Score: 21–18, 21–19	
13–18 June	Indonesia Open (Draw): Host: Jakarta, Indonesia; Venue: Istora Gelora Bung Karno; Level: Super 1000; Prize: $1,250,000; Format: 32MS/32WS/32MD/32WD/32XD	(India) Satwiksairaj Rankireddy (India) Chirag Shetty	(Malaysia) Aaron Chia (Malaysia) Soh Wooi Yik
13–18 June	Indonesia Open (Draw): Host: Jakarta, Indonesia; Venue: Istora Gelora Bung Karno; Level: Super 1000; Prize: $1,250,000; Format: 32MS/32WS/32MD/32WD/32XD	Score: 21–17, 21–18	
13–18 June	Indonesia Open (Draw): Host: Jakarta, Indonesia; Venue: Istora Gelora Bung Karno; Level: Super 1000; Prize: $1,250,000; Format: 32MS/32WS/32MD/32WD/32XD	(South Korea) Baek Ha-na (South Korea) Lee So-hee	(Japan) Yuki Fukushima (Japan) Sayaka Hirota
13–18 June	Indonesia Open (Draw): Host: Jakarta, Indonesia; Venue: Istora Gelora Bung Karno; Level: Super 1000; Prize: $1,250,000; Format: 32MS/32WS/32MD/32WD/32XD	Score: 22–20, 21–10	
13–18 June	Indonesia Open (Draw): Host: Jakarta, Indonesia; Venue: Istora Gelora Bung Karno; Level: Super 1000; Prize: $1,250,000; Format: 32MS/32WS/32MD/32WD/32XD	(China) Zheng Siwei (China) Huang Yaqiong	(Japan) Yuta Watanabe (Japan) Arisa Higashino
13–18 June	Indonesia Open (Draw): Host: Jakarta, Indonesia; Venue: Istora Gelora Bung Karno; Level: Super 1000; Prize: $1,250,000; Format: 32MS/32WS/32MD/32WD/32XD	Score: 21–14, 21–11	
20–25 June	Taipei Open (Draw): Host: Taipei, Taiwan; Venue: Tian-mu Arena; Level: Super 300; Prize: $210,000; Format: 32MS/32WS/32MD/32WD/32XD	(Indonesia) Chico Aura Dwi Wardoyo	(Chinese Taipei) Su Li-yang
20–25 June	Taipei Open (Draw): Host: Taipei, Taiwan; Venue: Tian-mu Arena; Level: Super 300; Prize: $210,000; Format: 32MS/32WS/32MD/32WD/32XD	Score: 23–21, 21–15	
20–25 June	Taipei Open (Draw): Host: Taipei, Taiwan; Venue: Tian-mu Arena; Level: Super 300; Prize: $210,000; Format: 32MS/32WS/32MD/32WD/32XD	(Chinese Taipei) Tai Tzu-ying	(United States) Beiwen Zhang
20–25 June	Taipei Open (Draw): Host: Taipei, Taiwan; Venue: Tian-mu Arena; Level: Super 300; Prize: $210,000; Format: 32MS/32WS/32MD/32WD/32XD	Score: 21–14, 21–17	
20–25 June	Taipei Open (Draw): Host: Taipei, Taiwan; Venue: Tian-mu Arena; Level: Super 300; Prize: $210,000; Format: 32MS/32WS/32MD/32WD/32XD	(Malaysia) Man Wei Chong (Malaysia) Tee Kai Wun	(Chinese Taipei) Lu Ching-yao (Chinese Taipei) Yang Po-han
20–25 June	Taipei Open (Draw): Host: Taipei, Taiwan; Venue: Tian-mu Arena; Level: Super 300; Prize: $210,000; Format: 32MS/32WS/32MD/32WD/32XD	Score: 20–22, 21–17, 21–14	
20–25 June	Taipei Open (Draw): Host: Taipei, Taiwan; Venue: Tian-mu Arena; Level: Super 300; Prize: $210,000; Format: 32MS/32WS/32MD/32WD/32XD	(South Korea) Lee Yu-lim (South Korea) Shin Seung-chan	(Indonesia) Febriana Dwipuji Kusuma (Indonesia) Amalia Cahaya Pratiwi
20–25 June	Taipei Open (Draw): Host: Taipei, Taiwan; Venue: Tian-mu Arena; Level: Super 300; Prize: $210,000; Format: 32MS/32WS/32MD/32WD/32XD	Score: 18–21, 21–17, 21–17	
20–25 June	Taipei Open (Draw): Host: Taipei, Taiwan; Venue: Tian-mu Arena; Level: Super 300; Prize: $210,000; Format: 32MS/32WS/32MD/32WD/32XD	(Malaysia) Chen Tang Jie (Malaysia) Toh Ee Wei	(Chinese Taipei) Chiu Hsiang-chieh (Chinese Taipei) Lin Xiao-min
20–25 June	Taipei Open (Draw): Host: Taipei, Taiwan; Venue: Tian-mu Arena; Level: Super 300; Prize: $210,000; Format: 32MS/32WS/32MD/32WD/32XD	Score: 21–12, 21–8	

=== July ===
Date	Tournament	Champions	Runners-up
4–9 July	Canada Open (Draw): Host: Calgary, Canada; Venue: Markin MacPhail Centre; Level: Super 500; Prize: $420,000; Format: 48MS/32WS/32MD/32WD/32XD	(India) Lakshya Sen	(China) Li Shifeng
4–9 July	Canada Open (Draw): Host: Calgary, Canada; Venue: Markin MacPhail Centre; Level: Super 500; Prize: $420,000; Format: 48MS/32WS/32MD/32WD/32XD	Score: 21–18, 22–20	
4–9 July	Canada Open (Draw): Host: Calgary, Canada; Venue: Markin MacPhail Centre; Level: Super 500; Prize: $420,000; Format: 48MS/32WS/32MD/32WD/32XD	(Japan) Akane Yamaguchi	(Thailand) Ratchanok Intanon
4–9 July	Canada Open (Draw): Host: Calgary, Canada; Venue: Markin MacPhail Centre; Level: Super 500; Prize: $420,000; Format: 48MS/32WS/32MD/32WD/32XD	Score: 21–19, 21–16	
4–9 July	Canada Open (Draw): Host: Calgary, Canada; Venue: Markin MacPhail Centre; Level: Super 500; Prize: $420,000; Format: 48MS/32WS/32MD/32WD/32XD	(Denmark) Kim Astrup (Denmark) Anders Skaarup Rasmussen	(Denmark) Rasmus Kjær (Denmark) Frederik Søgaard
4–9 July	Canada Open (Draw): Host: Calgary, Canada; Venue: Markin MacPhail Centre; Level: Super 500; Prize: $420,000; Format: 48MS/32WS/32MD/32WD/32XD	Score: 23–25, 21–16, 21–12	
4–9 July	Canada Open (Draw): Host: Calgary, Canada; Venue: Markin MacPhail Centre; Level: Super 500; Prize: $420,000; Format: 48MS/32WS/32MD/32WD/32XD	(Japan) Nami Matsuyama (Japan) Chiharu Shida	(Japan) Mayu Matsumoto (Japan) Wakana Nagahara
4–9 July	Canada Open (Draw): Host: Calgary, Canada; Venue: Markin MacPhail Centre; Level: Super 500; Prize: $420,000; Format: 48MS/32WS/32MD/32WD/32XD	Score: 22–20, 21–16	
4–9 July	Canada Open (Draw): Host: Calgary, Canada; Venue: Markin MacPhail Centre; Level: Super 500; Prize: $420,000; Format: 48MS/32WS/32MD/32WD/32XD	(Japan) Hiroki Midorikawa (Japan) Natsu Saito	(Denmark) Mathias Thyrri (Denmark) Amalie Magelund
4–9 July	Canada Open (Draw): Host: Calgary, Canada; Venue: Markin MacPhail Centre; Level: Super 500; Prize: $420,000; Format: 48MS/32WS/32MD/32WD/32XD	Score: 21–17, 16–21, 21–13	
11–16 July	U.S. Open (Draw): Host: Council Bluffs, United States; Venue: Mid-America Center; Level: Super 300; Prize: $210,000; Format: 32MS/32WS/32MD/32WD/32XD	(China) Li Shifeng	(Thailand) Kunlavut Vitidsarn
11–16 July	U.S. Open (Draw): Host: Council Bluffs, United States; Venue: Mid-America Center; Level: Super 300; Prize: $210,000; Format: 32MS/32WS/32MD/32WD/32XD	Score: 21–15, 21–18	
11–16 July	U.S. Open (Draw): Host: Council Bluffs, United States; Venue: Mid-America Center; Level: Super 300; Prize: $210,000; Format: 32MS/32WS/32MD/32WD/32XD	(Thailand) Supanida Katethong	(China) Gao Fangjie
11–16 July	U.S. Open (Draw): Host: Council Bluffs, United States; Venue: Mid-America Center; Level: Super 300; Prize: $210,000; Format: 32MS/32WS/32MD/32WD/32XD	Score: 21–15, 21–16	
11–16 July	U.S. Open (Draw): Host: Council Bluffs, United States; Venue: Mid-America Center; Level: Super 300; Prize: $210,000; Format: 32MS/32WS/32MD/32WD/32XD	(Malaysia) Goh Sze Fei (Malaysia) Nur Izzuddin	(Chinese Taipei) Lee Fang-chih (Chinese Taipei) Lee Fang-jen
11–16 July	U.S. Open (Draw): Host: Council Bluffs, United States; Venue: Mid-America Center; Level: Super 300; Prize: $210,000; Format: 32MS/32WS/32MD/32WD/32XD	Score: 21–9, 21–10	
11–16 July	U.S. Open (Draw): Host: Council Bluffs, United States; Venue: Mid-America Center; Level: Super 300; Prize: $210,000; Format: 32MS/32WS/32MD/32WD/32XD	(China) Liu Shengshu (China) Tan Ning	(Denmark) Maiken Fruergaard (Denmark) Sara Thygesen
11–16 July	U.S. Open (Draw): Host: Council Bluffs, United States; Venue: Mid-America Center; Level: Super 300; Prize: $210,000; Format: 32MS/32WS/32MD/32WD/32XD	Score: 21–19, 21–19	
11–16 July	U.S. Open (Draw): Host: Council Bluffs, United States; Venue: Mid-America Center; Level: Super 300; Prize: $210,000; Format: 32MS/32WS/32MD/32WD/32XD	(Chinese Taipei) Ye Hong-wei (Chinese Taipei) Lee Chia-hsin	(Denmark) Mathias Thyrri (Denmark) Amalie Magelund
11–16 July	U.S. Open (Draw): Host: Council Bluffs, United States; Venue: Mid-America Center; Level: Super 300; Prize: $210,000; Format: 32MS/32WS/32MD/32WD/32XD	Score: 13–21, 21–6, 21–18	
18–23 July	Korea Open (Draw): Host: Yeosu, South Korea; Venue: Yeosu Jinnam Stadium; Level: Super 500; Prize: $420,000; Format: 32MS/32WS/32MD/16WD/32XD	(Denmark) Anders Antonsen	(Singapore) Loh Kean Yew
18–23 July	Korea Open (Draw): Host: Yeosu, South Korea; Venue: Yeosu Jinnam Stadium; Level: Super 500; Prize: $420,000; Format: 32MS/32WS/32MD/16WD/32XD	Score: 11–21, 21–11, 21–19	
18–23 July	Korea Open (Draw): Host: Yeosu, South Korea; Venue: Yeosu Jinnam Stadium; Level: Super 500; Prize: $420,000; Format: 32MS/32WS/32MD/16WD/32XD	(South Korea) An Se-young	(Chinese Taipei) Tai Tzu-ying
18–23 July	Korea Open (Draw): Host: Yeosu, South Korea; Venue: Yeosu Jinnam Stadium; Level: Super 500; Prize: $420,000; Format: 32MS/32WS/32MD/16WD/32XD	Score: 21–9, 21–15	
18–23 July	Korea Open (Draw): Host: Yeosu, South Korea; Venue: Yeosu Jinnam Stadium; Level: Super 500; Prize: $420,000; Format: 32MS/32WS/32MD/16WD/32XD	(India) Satwiksairaj Rankireddy (India) Chirag Shetty	(Indonesia) Fajar Alfian (Indonesia) Muhammad Rian Ardianto
18–23 July	Korea Open (Draw): Host: Yeosu, South Korea; Venue: Yeosu Jinnam Stadium; Level: Super 500; Prize: $420,000; Format: 32MS/32WS/32MD/16WD/32XD	Score: 17–21, 21–13, 21–14	
18–23 July	Korea Open (Draw): Host: Yeosu, South Korea; Venue: Yeosu Jinnam Stadium; Level: Super 500; Prize: $420,000; Format: 32MS/32WS/32MD/16WD/32XD	(China) Chen Qingchen (China) Jia Yifan	(South Korea) Kim So-yeong (South Korea) Kong Hee-yong
18–23 July	Korea Open (Draw): Host: Yeosu, South Korea; Venue: Yeosu Jinnam Stadium; Level: Super 500; Prize: $420,000; Format: 32MS/32WS/32MD/16WD/32XD	Score: 21–10, 17–21, 21–7	
18–23 July	Korea Open (Draw): Host: Yeosu, South Korea; Venue: Yeosu Jinnam Stadium; Level: Super 500; Prize: $420,000; Format: 32MS/32WS/32MD/16WD/32XD	(China) Feng Yanzhe (China) Huang Dongping	(China) Jiang Zhenbang (China) Wei Yaxin
18–23 July	Korea Open (Draw): Host: Yeosu, South Korea; Venue: Yeosu Jinnam Stadium; Level: Super 500; Prize: $420,000; Format: 32MS/32WS/32MD/16WD/32XD	Score: 21–16, 21–13	
25–30 July	Japan Open (Draw): Host: Tokyo, Japan; Venue: Yoyogi 1st Gymnasium; Level: Super 750; Prize: $850,000; Format: 32MS/32WS/32MD/32WD/32XD	(Denmark) Viktor Axelsen	(Indonesia) Jonatan Christie
25–30 July	Japan Open (Draw): Host: Tokyo, Japan; Venue: Yoyogi 1st Gymnasium; Level: Super 750; Prize: $850,000; Format: 32MS/32WS/32MD/32WD/32XD	Score: 21–7, 21–18	
25–30 July	Japan Open (Draw): Host: Tokyo, Japan; Venue: Yoyogi 1st Gymnasium; Level: Super 750; Prize: $850,000; Format: 32MS/32WS/32MD/32WD/32XD	(South Korea) An Se-young	(China) He Bingjiao
25–30 July	Japan Open (Draw): Host: Tokyo, Japan; Venue: Yoyogi 1st Gymnasium; Level: Super 750; Prize: $850,000; Format: 32MS/32WS/32MD/32WD/32XD	Score: 21–15, 21–11	
25–30 July	Japan Open (Draw): Host: Tokyo, Japan; Venue: Yoyogi 1st Gymnasium; Level: Super 750; Prize: $850,000; Format: 32MS/32WS/32MD/32WD/32XD	(Chinese Taipei) Lee Yang (Chinese Taipei) Wang Chi-lin	(Japan) Takuro Hoki (Japan) Yugo Kobayashi
25–30 July	Japan Open (Draw): Host: Tokyo, Japan; Venue: Yoyogi 1st Gymnasium; Level: Super 750; Prize: $850,000; Format: 32MS/32WS/32MD/32WD/32XD	Score: 21–19, 21–13	
25–30 July	Japan Open (Draw): Host: Tokyo, Japan; Venue: Yoyogi 1st Gymnasium; Level: Super 750; Prize: $850,000; Format: 32MS/32WS/32MD/32WD/32XD	(South Korea) Kim So-yeong (South Korea) Kong Hee-yong	(China) Chen Qingchen (China) Jia Yifan
25–30 July	Japan Open (Draw): Host: Tokyo, Japan; Venue: Yoyogi 1st Gymnasium; Level: Super 750; Prize: $850,000; Format: 32MS/32WS/32MD/32WD/32XD	Score: 21–17, 21–14	
25–30 July	Japan Open (Draw): Host: Tokyo, Japan; Venue: Yoyogi 1st Gymnasium; Level: Super 750; Prize: $850,000; Format: 32MS/32WS/32MD/32WD/32XD	(Japan) Yuta Watanabe (Japan) Arisa Higashino	(Thailand) Dechapol Puavaranukroh (Thailand) Sapsiree Taerattanachai
25–30 July	Japan Open (Draw): Host: Tokyo, Japan; Venue: Yoyogi 1st Gymnasium; Level: Super 750; Prize: $850,000; Format: 32MS/32WS/32MD/32WD/32XD	Score: 17–21, 21–16, 21–15	

=== August ===
Date	Tournament	Champions	Runners-up
1–6 August	Australian Open (Draw): Host: Sydney, Australia; Venue: State Sports Centre; Level: Super 500; Prize: $420,000; Format: 32MS/32WS/32MD/32WD/32XD	(China) Weng Hongyang	(India) Prannoy H. S.
1–6 August	Australian Open (Draw): Host: Sydney, Australia; Venue: State Sports Centre; Level: Super 500; Prize: $420,000; Format: 32MS/32WS/32MD/32WD/32XD	Score: 21–9, 21–23, 22–20	
1–6 August	Australian Open (Draw): Host: Sydney, Australia; Venue: State Sports Centre; Level: Super 500; Prize: $420,000; Format: 32MS/32WS/32MD/32WD/32XD	(United States) Beiwen Zhang	(South Korea) Kim Ga-eun
1–6 August	Australian Open (Draw): Host: Sydney, Australia; Venue: State Sports Centre; Level: Super 500; Prize: $420,000; Format: 32MS/32WS/32MD/32WD/32XD	Score: 20–22, 21–16, 21–8	
1–6 August	Australian Open (Draw): Host: Sydney, Australia; Venue: State Sports Centre; Level: Super 500; Prize: $420,000; Format: 32MS/32WS/32MD/32WD/32XD	(South Korea) Kang Min-hyuk (South Korea) Seo Seung-jae	(Japan) Takuro Hoki (Japan) Yugo Kobayashi
1–6 August	Australian Open (Draw): Host: Sydney, Australia; Venue: State Sports Centre; Level: Super 500; Prize: $420,000; Format: 32MS/32WS/32MD/32WD/32XD	Score: 21–17, 21–17	
1–6 August	Australian Open (Draw): Host: Sydney, Australia; Venue: State Sports Centre; Level: Super 500; Prize: $420,000; Format: 32MS/32WS/32MD/32WD/32XD	(South Korea) Kim So-yeong (South Korea) Kong Hee-yong	(China) Liu Shengshu (China) Tan Ning
1–6 August	Australian Open (Draw): Host: Sydney, Australia; Venue: State Sports Centre; Level: Super 500; Prize: $420,000; Format: 32MS/32WS/32MD/32WD/32XD	Score: 21–18, 21–16	
1–6 August	Australian Open (Draw): Host: Sydney, Australia; Venue: State Sports Centre; Level: Super 500; Prize: $420,000; Format: 32MS/32WS/32MD/32WD/32XD	(China) Feng Yanzhe (China) Huang Dongping	(Japan) Hiroki Midorikawa (Japan) Natsu Saito
1–6 August	Australian Open (Draw): Host: Sydney, Australia; Venue: State Sports Centre; Level: Super 500; Prize: $420,000; Format: 32MS/32WS/32MD/32WD/32XD	Score: 21–14, 16–21, 21–15	
8–13 August	New Zealand Open (Draw) (cancelled) (Note: This tournament, originally to be played on 8–13 August, was later cancelled because Badminton New Zealand has relinquished its hosting rights of the HSBC BWF World Tour Super 300 New Zealand Open for the next four years.): Host: Auckland, New Zealand; Venue: Eventfinda Stadium; Level: Super 300; Prize: $210,000; Format: 32MS/32WS/32MD/32WD/32XD		
8–13 August	New Zealand Open (Draw) (cancelled): Host: Auckland, New Zealand; Venue: Eventfinda Stadium; Level: Super 300; Prize: $210,000; Format: 32MS/32WS/32MD/32WD/32XD	Score:	
8–13 August	New Zealand Open (Draw) (cancelled): Host: Auckland, New Zealand; Venue: Eventfinda Stadium; Level: Super 300; Prize: $210,000; Format: 32MS/32WS/32MD/32WD/32XD	Score:	
8–13 August	New Zealand Open (Draw) (cancelled): Host: Auckland, New Zealand; Venue: Eventfinda Stadium; Level: Super 300; Prize: $210,000; Format: 32MS/32WS/32MD/32WD/32XD	Score:	
8–13 August	New Zealand Open (Draw) (cancelled): Host: Auckland, New Zealand; Venue: Eventfinda Stadium; Level: Super 300; Prize: $210,000; Format: 32MS/32WS/32MD/32WD/32XD	Score:	
8–13 August	New Zealand Open (Draw) (cancelled): Host: Auckland, New Zealand; Venue: Eventfinda Stadium; Level: Super 300; Prize: $210,000; Format: 32MS/32WS/32MD/32WD/32XD	Score:	

=== September ===
Date	Tournament	Champions	Runners-up
5–10 September	China Open (Draw): Host: Changzhou, China; Venue: Xincheng Gymnasium; Level: Super 1000; Prize: $2,000,000; Format: 32MS/32WS/32MD/32WD/32XD	(Denmark) Viktor Axelsen	(China) Lu Guangzu
5–10 September	China Open (Draw): Host: Changzhou, China; Venue: Xincheng Gymnasium; Level: Super 1000; Prize: $2,000,000; Format: 32MS/32WS/32MD/32WD/32XD	Score: 21–16, 21–19	
5–10 September	China Open (Draw): Host: Changzhou, China; Venue: Xincheng Gymnasium; Level: Super 1000; Prize: $2,000,000; Format: 32MS/32WS/32MD/32WD/32XD	(South Korea) An Se-young	(Japan) Akane Yamaguchi
5–10 September	China Open (Draw): Host: Changzhou, China; Venue: Xincheng Gymnasium; Level: Super 1000; Prize: $2,000,000; Format: 32MS/32WS/32MD/32WD/32XD	Score: 21–10, 21–19	
5–10 September	China Open (Draw): Host: Changzhou, China; Venue: Xincheng Gymnasium; Level: Super 1000; Prize: $2,000,000; Format: 32MS/32WS/32MD/32WD/32XD	(China) Liang Weikeng (China) Wang Chang	(Malaysia) Aaron Chia (Malaysia) Soh Wooi Yik
5–10 September	China Open (Draw): Host: Changzhou, China; Venue: Xincheng Gymnasium; Level: Super 1000; Prize: $2,000,000; Format: 32MS/32WS/32MD/32WD/32XD	Score: 21–12, 21–14	
5–10 September	China Open (Draw): Host: Changzhou, China; Venue: Xincheng Gymnasium; Level: Super 1000; Prize: $2,000,000; Format: 32MS/32WS/32MD/32WD/32XD	(China) Chen Qingchen (China) Jia Yifan	(South Korea) Baek Ha-na (South Korea) Lee So-hee
5–10 September	China Open (Draw): Host: Changzhou, China; Venue: Xincheng Gymnasium; Level: Super 1000; Prize: $2,000,000; Format: 32MS/32WS/32MD/32WD/32XD	Score: 21–11, 21–17	
5–10 September	China Open (Draw): Host: Changzhou, China; Venue: Xincheng Gymnasium; Level: Super 1000; Prize: $2,000,000; Format: 32MS/32WS/32MD/32WD/32XD	(South Korea) Seo Seung-jae (South Korea) Chae Yoo-jung	(France) Thom Gicquel (France) Delphine Delrue
5–10 September	China Open (Draw): Host: Changzhou, China; Venue: Xincheng Gymnasium; Level: Super 1000; Prize: $2,000,000; Format: 32MS/32WS/32MD/32WD/32XD	Score: 21–19, 21–12	
5–10 September	Indonesia Masters Super 100 I (Draw): Host: Medan, Indonesia; Venue: GOR PBSI Pancing; Level: Super 100; Prize: $100,000; Format: 48MS/32WS/32MD/32WD/32XD	(India) Kiran George	(Japan) Koo Takahashi
5–10 September	Indonesia Masters Super 100 I (Draw): Host: Medan, Indonesia; Venue: GOR PBSI Pancing; Level: Super 100; Prize: $100,000; Format: 48MS/32WS/32MD/32WD/32XD	Score: 21–19, 22–20	
5–10 September	Indonesia Masters Super 100 I (Draw): Host: Medan, Indonesia; Venue: GOR PBSI Pancing; Level: Super 100; Prize: $100,000; Format: 48MS/32WS/32MD/32WD/32XD	(Indonesia) Ester Nurumi Tri Wardoyo	(Chinese Taipei) Chiu Pin-chian
5–10 September	Indonesia Masters Super 100 I (Draw): Host: Medan, Indonesia; Venue: GOR PBSI Pancing; Level: Super 100; Prize: $100,000; Format: 48MS/32WS/32MD/32WD/32XD	Score: 21–15, 21–19	
5–10 September	Indonesia Masters Super 100 I (Draw): Host: Medan, Indonesia; Venue: GOR PBSI Pancing; Level: Super 100; Prize: $100,000; Format: 48MS/32WS/32MD/32WD/32XD	(Indonesia) Sabar Karyaman Gutama (Indonesia) Muhammad Reza Pahlevi Isfahani	(Japan) Kakeru Kumagai (Japan) Kota Ogawa
5–10 September	Indonesia Masters Super 100 I (Draw): Host: Medan, Indonesia; Venue: GOR PBSI Pancing; Level: Super 100; Prize: $100,000; Format: 48MS/32WS/32MD/32WD/32XD	Score: 21–18, 21–15	
5–10 September	Indonesia Masters Super 100 I (Draw): Host: Medan, Indonesia; Venue: GOR PBSI Pancing; Level: Super 100; Prize: $100,000; Format: 48MS/32WS/32MD/32WD/32XD	(Indonesia) Lanny Tria Mayasari (Indonesia) Ribka Sugiarto	(Chinese Taipei) Chang Ching-hui (Chinese Taipei) Yang Ching-tun
5–10 September	Indonesia Masters Super 100 I (Draw): Host: Medan, Indonesia; Venue: GOR PBSI Pancing; Level: Super 100; Prize: $100,000; Format: 48MS/32WS/32MD/32WD/32XD	Score: 22–20, 21–10	
5–10 September	Indonesia Masters Super 100 I (Draw): Host: Medan, Indonesia; Venue: GOR PBSI Pancing; Level: Super 100; Prize: $100,000; Format: 48MS/32WS/32MD/32WD/32XD	(Malaysia) Yap Roy King (Malaysia) Valeree Siow	(Japan) Hiroki Nishi (Japan) Akari Sato
5–10 September	Indonesia Masters Super 100 I (Draw): Host: Medan, Indonesia; Venue: GOR PBSI Pancing; Level: Super 100; Prize: $100,000; Format: 48MS/32WS/32MD/32WD/32XD	Score: 13–21, 21–14, 21–14	
12–17 September	Hong Kong Open (Draw): Host: Kowloon, Hong Kong; Venue: Hong Kong Coliseum; Level: Super 500; Prize: $420,000; Format: 32MS/32WS/32MD/32WD/32XD	(Indonesia) Jonatan Christie	(Japan) Kenta Nishimoto
12–17 September	Hong Kong Open (Draw): Host: Kowloon, Hong Kong; Venue: Hong Kong Coliseum; Level: Super 500; Prize: $420,000; Format: 32MS/32WS/32MD/32WD/32XD	Score: 12–21, 22–20, 21–18	
12–17 September	Hong Kong Open (Draw): Host: Kowloon, Hong Kong; Venue: Hong Kong Coliseum; Level: Super 500; Prize: $420,000; Format: 32MS/32WS/32MD/32WD/32XD	(Japan) Akane Yamaguchi	(China) Zhang Yiman
12–17 September	Hong Kong Open (Draw): Host: Kowloon, Hong Kong; Venue: Hong Kong Coliseum; Level: Super 500; Prize: $420,000; Format: 32MS/32WS/32MD/32WD/32XD	Score: 21–18, 21–15	
12–17 September	Hong Kong Open (Draw): Host: Kowloon, Hong Kong; Venue: Hong Kong Coliseum; Level: Super 500; Prize: $420,000; Format: 32MS/32WS/32MD/32WD/32XD	(Denmark) Kim Astrup (Denmark) Anders Skaarup Rasmussen	(Indonesia) Leo Rolly Carnando (Indonesia) Daniel Marthin
12–17 September	Hong Kong Open (Draw): Host: Kowloon, Hong Kong; Venue: Hong Kong Coliseum; Level: Super 500; Prize: $420,000; Format: 32MS/32WS/32MD/32WD/32XD	Score: 21–10, 22–24, 21–19	
12–17 September	Hong Kong Open (Draw): Host: Kowloon, Hong Kong; Venue: Hong Kong Coliseum; Level: Super 500; Prize: $420,000; Format: 32MS/32WS/32MD/32WD/32XD	(Indonesia) Apriyani Rahayu (Indonesia) Siti Fadia Silva Ramadhanti	(Malaysia) Pearly Tan (Malaysia) Thinaah Muralitharan
12–17 September	Hong Kong Open (Draw): Host: Kowloon, Hong Kong; Venue: Hong Kong Coliseum; Level: Super 500; Prize: $420,000; Format: 32MS/32WS/32MD/32WD/32XD	Score: 14–21, 24–22, 21–9	
12–17 September	Hong Kong Open (Draw): Host: Kowloon, Hong Kong; Venue: Hong Kong Coliseum; Level: Super 500; Prize: $420,000; Format: 32MS/32WS/32MD/32WD/32XD	(China) Guo Xinwa (China) Wei Yaxin	(Hong Kong) Tang Chun Man (Hong Kong) Tse Ying Suet
12–17 September	Hong Kong Open (Draw): Host: Kowloon, Hong Kong; Venue: Hong Kong Coliseum; Level: Super 500; Prize: $420,000; Format: 32MS/32WS/32MD/32WD/32XD	Score: 21–13, 21–19	
12–17 September	Vietnam Open (Draw): Host: Ho Chi Minh City, Vietnam; Venue: Nguyen Du Cultural Sports Club; Level: Super 100; Prize: $100,000; Format: 48MS/32WS/32MD/32WD/32XD	(Chinese Taipei) Huang Yu-kai	(Japan) Takuma Obayashi
12–17 September	Vietnam Open (Draw): Host: Ho Chi Minh City, Vietnam; Venue: Nguyen Du Cultural Sports Club; Level: Super 100; Prize: $100,000; Format: 48MS/32WS/32MD/32WD/32XD	Score: 21–13, 21–17	
12–17 September	Vietnam Open (Draw): Host: Ho Chi Minh City, Vietnam; Venue: Nguyen Du Cultural Sports Club; Level: Super 100; Prize: $100,000; Format: 48MS/32WS/32MD/32WD/32XD	(Vietnam) Nguyễn Thùy Linh	(Japan) Akari Kurihara
12–17 September	Vietnam Open (Draw): Host: Ho Chi Minh City, Vietnam; Venue: Nguyen Du Cultural Sports Club; Level: Super 100; Prize: $100,000; Format: 48MS/32WS/32MD/32WD/32XD	Score: 21–14, 11–21, 21–19	
12–17 September	Vietnam Open (Draw): Host: Ho Chi Minh City, Vietnam; Venue: Nguyen Du Cultural Sports Club; Level: Super 100; Prize: $100,000; Format: 48MS/32WS/32MD/32WD/32XD	(Japan) Kenya Mitsuhashi (Japan) Hiroki Okamura	(Indonesia) Hardianto (Indonesia) Ade Yusuf Santoso
12–17 September	Vietnam Open (Draw): Host: Ho Chi Minh City, Vietnam; Venue: Nguyen Du Cultural Sports Club; Level: Super 100; Prize: $100,000; Format: 48MS/32WS/32MD/32WD/32XD	Score: 21–19, 21–19	
12–17 September	Vietnam Open (Draw): Host: Ho Chi Minh City, Vietnam; Venue: Nguyen Du Cultural Sports Club; Level: Super 100; Prize: $100,000; Format: 48MS/32WS/32MD/32WD/32XD	(Chinese Taipei) Hsieh Pei-shan (Chinese Taipei) Tseng Yu-chi	(Chinese Taipei) Hung En-tzu (Chinese Taipei) Lin Yu-pei
12–17 September	Vietnam Open (Draw): Host: Ho Chi Minh City, Vietnam; Venue: Nguyen Du Cultural Sports Club; Level: Super 100; Prize: $100,000; Format: 48MS/32WS/32MD/32WD/32XD	Score: 21–18, 21–14	
12–17 September	Vietnam Open (Draw): Host: Ho Chi Minh City, Vietnam; Venue: Nguyen Du Cultural Sports Club; Level: Super 100; Prize: $100,000; Format: 48MS/32WS/32MD/32WD/32XD	(Japan) Hiroki Nishi (Japan) Akari Sato	(Thailand) Ruttanapak Oupthong (Thailand) Jhenicha Sudjaipraparat
12–17 September	Vietnam Open (Draw): Host: Ho Chi Minh City, Vietnam; Venue: Nguyen Du Cultural Sports Club; Level: Super 100; Prize: $100,000; Format: 48MS/32WS/32MD/32WD/32XD	Score: 15–21, 21–18, 21–14	
26 September – 1 October	Kaohsiung Masters (Draw): Host: Kaohsiung, Taiwan; Venue: Kaohsiung Arena; Level: Super 100; Prize: $100,000; Format: 48MS/32WS/32MD/32WD/32XD	(Chinese Taipei) Lin Chun-yi	(Japan) Yushi Tanaka
26 September – 1 October	Kaohsiung Masters (Draw): Host: Kaohsiung, Taiwan; Venue: Kaohsiung Arena; Level: Super 100; Prize: $100,000; Format: 48MS/32WS/32MD/32WD/32XD	Score: 11–21, 21–17, 21–14	
26 September – 1 October	Kaohsiung Masters (Draw): Host: Kaohsiung, Taiwan; Venue: Kaohsiung Arena; Level: Super 100; Prize: $100,000; Format: 48MS/32WS/32MD/32WD/32XD	(Chinese Taipei) Liang Ting-yu	(Japan) Riko Gunji
26 September – 1 October	Kaohsiung Masters (Draw): Host: Kaohsiung, Taiwan; Venue: Kaohsiung Arena; Level: Super 100; Prize: $100,000; Format: 48MS/32WS/32MD/32WD/32XD	Score: 22–20, 15–21, 21–14	
26 September – 1 October	Kaohsiung Masters (Draw): Host: Kaohsiung, Taiwan; Venue: Kaohsiung Arena; Level: Super 100; Prize: $100,000; Format: 48MS/32WS/32MD/32WD/32XD	(Malaysia) Goh Sze Fei (Malaysia) Nur Izzuddin	(Chinese Taipei) Lee Jhe-huei (Chinese Taipei) Yang Po-hsuan
26 September – 1 October	Kaohsiung Masters (Draw): Host: Kaohsiung, Taiwan; Venue: Kaohsiung Arena; Level: Super 100; Prize: $100,000; Format: 48MS/32WS/32MD/32WD/32XD	Score: 21–14, 21–10	
26 September – 1 October	Kaohsiung Masters (Draw): Host: Kaohsiung, Taiwan; Venue: Kaohsiung Arena; Level: Super 100; Prize: $100,000; Format: 48MS/32WS/32MD/32WD/32XD	(Australia) Setyana Mapasa (Australia) Angela Yu	(Japan) Maiko Kawazoe (Japan) Haruna Konishi
26 September – 1 October	Kaohsiung Masters (Draw): Host: Kaohsiung, Taiwan; Venue: Kaohsiung Arena; Level: Super 100; Prize: $100,000; Format: 48MS/32WS/32MD/32WD/32XD	Score: 21–19, 8–21, 21–19	
26 September – 1 October	Kaohsiung Masters (Draw): Host: Kaohsiung, Taiwan; Venue: Kaohsiung Arena; Level: Super 100; Prize: $100,000; Format: 48MS/32WS/32MD/32WD/32XD	(Japan) Hiroki Nishi (Japan) Akari Sato	(Indonesia) Dejan Ferdinansyah (Indonesia) Gloria Emanuelle Widjaja
26 September – 1 October	Kaohsiung Masters (Draw): Host: Kaohsiung, Taiwan; Venue: Kaohsiung Arena; Level: Super 100; Prize: $100,000; Format: 48MS/32WS/32MD/32WD/32XD	Score: 22–20, 12–21, 21–14	

=== October ===
Date	Tournament	Champions	Runners-up
10–15 October	Arctic Open (Draw): Host: Vantaa, Finland; Venue: Energia Areena; Level: Super 500; Prize: $420,000; Format: 32MS/32WS/32MD/32WD/32XD	(Malaysia) Lee Zii Jia	(Malaysia) Ng Tze Yong
10–15 October	Arctic Open (Draw): Host: Vantaa, Finland; Venue: Energia Areena; Level: Super 500; Prize: $420,000; Format: 32MS/32WS/32MD/32WD/32XD	Score: 21–14, 21–15	
10–15 October	Arctic Open (Draw): Host: Vantaa, Finland; Venue: Energia Areena; Level: Super 500; Prize: $420,000; Format: 32MS/32WS/32MD/32WD/32XD	(China) Han Yue	(China) Wang Zhiyi
10–15 October	Arctic Open (Draw): Host: Vantaa, Finland; Venue: Energia Areena; Level: Super 500; Prize: $420,000; Format: 32MS/32WS/32MD/32WD/32XD	Score: 16–21, 22–20, 21–12	
10–15 October	Arctic Open (Draw): Host: Vantaa, Finland; Venue: Energia Areena; Level: Super 500; Prize: $420,000; Format: 32MS/32WS/32MD/32WD/32XD	(Denmark) Kim Astrup (Denmark) Anders Skaarup Rasmussen	(Malaysia) Man Wei Chong (Malaysia) Tee Kai Wun
10–15 October	Arctic Open (Draw): Host: Vantaa, Finland; Venue: Energia Areena; Level: Super 500; Prize: $420,000; Format: 32MS/32WS/32MD/32WD/32XD	Score: 21–18, 21–17	
10–15 October	Arctic Open (Draw): Host: Vantaa, Finland; Venue: Energia Areena; Level: Super 500; Prize: $420,000; Format: 32MS/32WS/32MD/32WD/32XD	(China) Liu Shengshu (China) Tan Ning	(Thailand) Jongkolphan Kititharakul (Thailand) Rawinda Prajongjai
10–15 October	Arctic Open (Draw): Host: Vantaa, Finland; Venue: Energia Areena; Level: Super 500; Prize: $420,000; Format: 32MS/32WS/32MD/32WD/32XD	Score: 21–13, 24–22	
10–15 October	Arctic Open (Draw): Host: Vantaa, Finland; Venue: Energia Areena; Level: Super 500; Prize: $420,000; Format: 32MS/32WS/32MD/32WD/32XD	(China) Feng Yanzhe (China) Huang Dongping	(China) Jiang Zhenbang (China) Wei Yaxin
10–15 October	Arctic Open (Draw): Host: Vantaa, Finland; Venue: Energia Areena; Level: Super 500; Prize: $420,000; Format: 32MS/32WS/32MD/32WD/32XD	Score: 21–14, 21–15	
17–22 October	Denmark Open (Draw): Host: Odense, Denmark; Venue: Jyske Bank Arena; Level: Super 750; Prize: $850,000; Format: 32MS/32WS/32MD/32WD/32XD	(China) Weng Hongyang	(Malaysia) Lee Zii Jia
17–22 October	Denmark Open (Draw): Host: Odense, Denmark; Venue: Jyske Bank Arena; Level: Super 750; Prize: $850,000; Format: 32MS/32WS/32MD/32WD/32XD	Score: 21–12, 21–6	
17–22 October	Denmark Open (Draw): Host: Odense, Denmark; Venue: Jyske Bank Arena; Level: Super 750; Prize: $850,000; Format: 32MS/32WS/32MD/32WD/32XD	(China) Chen Yufei	(Spain) Carolina Marín
17–22 October	Denmark Open (Draw): Host: Odense, Denmark; Venue: Jyske Bank Arena; Level: Super 750; Prize: $850,000; Format: 32MS/32WS/32MD/32WD/32XD	Score: 21–14, 21–19	
17–22 October	Denmark Open (Draw): Host: Odense, Denmark; Venue: Jyske Bank Arena; Level: Super 750; Prize: $850,000; Format: 32MS/32WS/32MD/32WD/32XD	(Malaysia) Aaron Chia (Malaysia) Soh Wooi Yik	(Indonesia) Muhammad Shohibul Fikri (Indonesia) Bagas Maulana
17–22 October	Denmark Open (Draw): Host: Odense, Denmark; Venue: Jyske Bank Arena; Level: Super 750; Prize: $850,000; Format: 32MS/32WS/32MD/32WD/32XD	Score: 21–13, 21–17	
17–22 October	Denmark Open (Draw): Host: Odense, Denmark; Venue: Jyske Bank Arena; Level: Super 750; Prize: $850,000; Format: 32MS/32WS/32MD/32WD/32XD	(China) Chen Qingchen (China) Jia Yifan	(Japan) Nami Matsuyama (Japan) Chiharu Shida
17–22 October	Denmark Open (Draw): Host: Odense, Denmark; Venue: Jyske Bank Arena; Level: Super 750; Prize: $850,000; Format: 32MS/32WS/32MD/32WD/32XD	Score: 21–16, 21–13	
17–22 October	Denmark Open (Draw): Host: Odense, Denmark; Venue: Jyske Bank Arena; Level: Super 750; Prize: $850,000; Format: 32MS/32WS/32MD/32WD/32XD	(China) Feng Yanzhe (China) Huang Dongping	(China) Zheng Siwei (China) Huang Yaqiong
17–22 October	Denmark Open (Draw): Host: Odense, Denmark; Venue: Jyske Bank Arena; Level: Super 750; Prize: $850,000; Format: 32MS/32WS/32MD/32WD/32XD	Score: 16–21, 21–15, 26–24	
17–22 October	Abu Dhabi Masters (Draw): Host: Abu Dhabi, United Arab Emirates; Venue: ADNEC Marina Hall; Level: Super 100; Prize: $100,000; Format: 48MS/32WS/32MD/32WD/32XD	(Denmark) Mads Christophersen	(Netherlands) Mark Caljouw
17–22 October	Abu Dhabi Masters (Draw): Host: Abu Dhabi, United Arab Emirates; Venue: ADNEC Marina Hall; Level: Super 100; Prize: $100,000; Format: 48MS/32WS/32MD/32WD/32XD	Score: 21–19, 21–15	
17–22 October	Abu Dhabi Masters (Draw): Host: Abu Dhabi, United Arab Emirates; Venue: ADNEC Marina Hall; Level: Super 100; Prize: $100,000; Format: 48MS/32WS/32MD/32WD/32XD	(India) Unnati Hooda	(India) Samiya Imad Farooqui
17–22 October	Abu Dhabi Masters (Draw): Host: Abu Dhabi, United Arab Emirates; Venue: ADNEC Marina Hall; Level: Super 100; Prize: $100,000; Format: 48MS/32WS/32MD/32WD/32XD	Score: 21–16, 22–20	
17–22 October	Abu Dhabi Masters (Draw): Host: Abu Dhabi, United Arab Emirates; Venue: ADNEC Marina Hall; Level: Super 100; Prize: $100,000; Format: 48MS/32WS/32MD/32WD/32XD	(Malaysia) Goh Sze Fei (Malaysia) Nur Izzuddin	(Thailand) Pharanyu Kaosamaang (Thailand) Worrapol Thongsa-nga
17–22 October	Abu Dhabi Masters (Draw): Host: Abu Dhabi, United Arab Emirates; Venue: ADNEC Marina Hall; Level: Super 100; Prize: $100,000; Format: 48MS/32WS/32MD/32WD/32XD	Score: 18–21, 21–17, 21–12	
17–22 October	Abu Dhabi Masters (Draw): Host: Abu Dhabi, United Arab Emirates; Venue: ADNEC Marina Hall; Level: Super 100; Prize: $100,000; Format: 48MS/32WS/32MD/32WD/32XD	(India) Tanisha Crasto (India) Ashwini Ponnappa	(Denmark) Julie Finne-Ipsen (Denmark) Mai Surrow
17–22 October	Abu Dhabi Masters (Draw): Host: Abu Dhabi, United Arab Emirates; Venue: ADNEC Marina Hall; Level: Super 100; Prize: $100,000; Format: 48MS/32WS/32MD/32WD/32XD	Score: 21–16, 16–21, 21–8	
17–22 October	Abu Dhabi Masters (Draw): Host: Abu Dhabi, United Arab Emirates; Venue: ADNEC Marina Hall; Level: Super 100; Prize: $100,000; Format: 48MS/32WS/32MD/32WD/32XD	(Denmark) Mads Vestergaard (Denmark) Christine Busch	(Singapore) Terry Hee (Singapore) Jessica Tan
17–22 October	Abu Dhabi Masters (Draw): Host: Abu Dhabi, United Arab Emirates; Venue: ADNEC Marina Hall; Level: Super 100; Prize: $100,000; Format: 48MS/32WS/32MD/32WD/32XD	Score: 20–22, 21–17, 21–18	
24–29 October	French Open (Draw): Host: Rennes, France; Venue: Glaz Arena; Level: Super 750; Prize: $850,000; Format: 32MS/32WS/32MD/32WD/32XD	(Indonesia) Jonatan Christie	(China) Li Shifeng
24–29 October	French Open (Draw): Host: Rennes, France; Venue: Glaz Arena; Level: Super 750; Prize: $850,000; Format: 32MS/32WS/32MD/32WD/32XD	Score: 16–21, 21–15, 21–14	
24–29 October	French Open (Draw): Host: Rennes, France; Venue: Glaz Arena; Level: Super 750; Prize: $850,000; Format: 32MS/32WS/32MD/32WD/32XD	(China) Chen Yufei	(Chinese Taipei) Tai Tzu-ying
24–29 October	French Open (Draw): Host: Rennes, France; Venue: Glaz Arena; Level: Super 750; Prize: $850,000; Format: 32MS/32WS/32MD/32WD/32XD	Score: 21–17, 22–20	
24–29 October	French Open (Draw): Host: Rennes, France; Venue: Glaz Arena; Level: Super 750; Prize: $850,000; Format: 32MS/32WS/32MD/32WD/32XD	(Denmark) Kim Astrup (Denmark) Anders Skaarup Rasmussen	(Indonesia) Muhammad Shohibul Fikri (Indonesia) Bagas Maulana
24–29 October	French Open (Draw): Host: Rennes, France; Venue: Glaz Arena; Level: Super 750; Prize: $850,000; Format: 32MS/32WS/32MD/32WD/32XD	Score: 21–14, 10–21, 21–18	
24–29 October	French Open (Draw): Host: Rennes, France; Venue: Glaz Arena; Level: Super 750; Prize: $850,000; Format: 32MS/32WS/32MD/32WD/32XD	(China) Liu Shengshu (China) Tan Ning	(Thailand) Jongkolphan Kititharakul (Thailand) Rawinda Prajongjai
24–29 October	French Open (Draw): Host: Rennes, France; Venue: Glaz Arena; Level: Super 750; Prize: $850,000; Format: 32MS/32WS/32MD/32WD/32XD	Score: 26–24, 21–19	
24–29 October	French Open (Draw): Host: Rennes, France; Venue: Glaz Arena; Level: Super 750; Prize: $850,000; Format: 32MS/32WS/32MD/32WD/32XD	(China) Jiang Zhenbang (China) Wei Yaxin	(Hong Kong) Tang Chun Man (Hong Kong) Tse Ying Suet
24–29 October	French Open (Draw): Host: Rennes, France; Venue: Glaz Arena; Level: Super 750; Prize: $850,000; Format: 32MS/32WS/32MD/32WD/32XD	Score: 21–17, 15–21, 21–12	
24–29 October	Indonesia Masters Super 100 II (Draw): Host: Surabaya, Indonesia; Venue: Jatim International Expo Convention Exhibition; Level: Super 100; Prize: $100,000; Format: 48MS/32WS/32MD/32WD/32XD	(Japan) Takuma Obayashi	(South Korea) Choi Ji-hoon
24–29 October	Indonesia Masters Super 100 II (Draw): Host: Surabaya, Indonesia; Venue: Jatim International Expo Convention Exhibition; Level: Super 100; Prize: $100,000; Format: 48MS/32WS/32MD/32WD/32XD	Score: 21–8, 21–19	
24–29 October	Indonesia Masters Super 100 II (Draw): Host: Surabaya, Indonesia; Venue: Jatim International Expo Convention Exhibition; Level: Super 100; Prize: $100,000; Format: 48MS/32WS/32MD/32WD/32XD	(Japan) Tomoka Miyazaki	(Thailand) Pornpicha Choeikeewong
24–29 October	Indonesia Masters Super 100 II (Draw): Host: Surabaya, Indonesia; Venue: Jatim International Expo Convention Exhibition; Level: Super 100; Prize: $100,000; Format: 48MS/32WS/32MD/32WD/32XD	Score: 21–9, 21–15	
24–29 October	Indonesia Masters Super 100 II (Draw): Host: Surabaya, Indonesia; Venue: Jatim International Expo Convention Exhibition; Level: Super 100; Prize: $100,000; Format: 48MS/32WS/32MD/32WD/32XD	(Japan) Kenya Mitsuhashi (Japan) Hiroki Okamura	(Malaysia) Choong Hon Jian (Malaysia) Muhammad Haikal
24–29 October	Indonesia Masters Super 100 II (Draw): Host: Surabaya, Indonesia; Venue: Jatim International Expo Convention Exhibition; Level: Super 100; Prize: $100,000; Format: 48MS/32WS/32MD/32WD/32XD	Score: 21–16, 21–18	
24–29 October	Indonesia Masters Super 100 II (Draw): Host: Surabaya, Indonesia; Venue: Jatim International Expo Convention Exhibition; Level: Super 100; Prize: $100,000; Format: 48MS/32WS/32MD/32WD/32XD	(Indonesia) Lanny Tria Mayasari (Indonesia) Ribka Sugiarto	(Indonesia) Meilysa Trias Puspita Sari (Indonesia) Rachel Allessya Rose
24–29 October	Indonesia Masters Super 100 II (Draw): Host: Surabaya, Indonesia; Venue: Jatim International Expo Convention Exhibition; Level: Super 100; Prize: $100,000; Format: 48MS/32WS/32MD/32WD/32XD	Score: 21–12, 21–16	
24–29 October	Indonesia Masters Super 100 II (Draw): Host: Surabaya, Indonesia; Venue: Jatim International Expo Convention Exhibition; Level: Super 100; Prize: $100,000; Format: 48MS/32WS/32MD/32WD/32XD	(Indonesia) Jafar Hidayatullah (Indonesia) Aisyah Salsabila Putri Pranata	(Thailand) Ruttanapak Oupthong (Thailand) Jhenicha Sudjaipraparat
24–29 October	Indonesia Masters Super 100 II (Draw): Host: Surabaya, Indonesia; Venue: Jatim International Expo Convention Exhibition; Level: Super 100; Prize: $100,000; Format: 48MS/32WS/32MD/32WD/32XD	Score: 21–17, 21–19	
31 October – 5 November	Hylo Open (Draw): Host: Saarbrücken, Germany; Venue: Saarlandhalle; Level: Super 300; Prize: $210,000; Format: 32MS/32WS/32MD/32WD/32XD	(Chinese Taipei) Chou Tien-chen	(Hong Kong) Lee Cheuk Yiu
31 October – 5 November	Hylo Open (Draw): Host: Saarbrücken, Germany; Venue: Saarlandhalle; Level: Super 300; Prize: $210,000; Format: 32MS/32WS/32MD/32WD/32XD	Score: 21–23, 21–17, 21–10	
31 October – 5 November	Hylo Open (Draw): Host: Saarbrücken, Germany; Venue: Saarlandhalle; Level: Super 300; Prize: $210,000; Format: 32MS/32WS/32MD/32WD/32XD	(United States) Beiwen Zhang	(Denmark) Line Kjærsfeldt
31 October – 5 November	Hylo Open (Draw): Host: Saarbrücken, Germany; Venue: Saarlandhalle; Level: Super 300; Prize: $210,000; Format: 32MS/32WS/32MD/32WD/32XD	Score: 21–18, 16–21, 21–16	
31 October – 5 November	Hylo Open (Draw): Host: Saarbrücken, Germany; Venue: Saarlandhalle; Level: Super 300; Prize: $210,000; Format: 32MS/32WS/32MD/32WD/32XD	(China) Liu Yuchen (China) Ou Xuanyi	(Chinese Taipei) Lee Yang (Chinese Taipei) Wang Chi-lin
31 October – 5 November	Hylo Open (Draw): Host: Saarbrücken, Germany; Venue: Saarlandhalle; Level: Super 300; Prize: $210,000; Format: 32MS/32WS/32MD/32WD/32XD	Score: 24–22, 21–13	
31 October – 5 November	Hylo Open (Draw): Host: Saarbrücken, Germany; Venue: Saarlandhalle; Level: Super 300; Prize: $210,000; Format: 32MS/32WS/32MD/32WD/32XD	(China) Zhang Shuxian (China) Zheng Yu	(Indonesia) Apriyani Rahayu (Indonesia) Siti Fadia Silva Ramadhanti
31 October – 5 November	Hylo Open (Draw): Host: Saarbrücken, Germany; Venue: Saarlandhalle; Level: Super 300; Prize: $210,000; Format: 32MS/32WS/32MD/32WD/32XD	Score: 18–21, 1–1^{r}	
31 October – 5 November	Hylo Open (Draw): Host: Saarbrücken, Germany; Venue: Saarlandhalle; Level: Super 300; Prize: $210,000; Format: 32MS/32WS/32MD/32WD/32XD	(Hong Kong) Tang Chun Man (Hong Kong) Tse Ying Suet	(Indonesia) Rehan Naufal Kusharjanto (Indonesia) Lisa Ayu Kusumawati
31 October – 5 November	Hylo Open (Draw): Host: Saarbrücken, Germany; Venue: Saarlandhalle; Level: Super 300; Prize: $210,000; Format: 32MS/32WS/32MD/32WD/32XD	Score: 15–21, 21–15, 21–14	
31 October – 5 November	Malaysia Super 100 (Draw): Host: Kuala Lumpur, Malaysia; Venue: Stadium Titiwangsa; Level: Super 100; Prize: $100,000; Format: 48MS/32WS/32MD/32WD/32XD	(Malaysia) Leong Jun Hao	(Chinese Taipei) Lee Chia-hao
31 October – 5 November	Malaysia Super 100 (Draw): Host: Kuala Lumpur, Malaysia; Venue: Stadium Titiwangsa; Level: Super 100; Prize: $100,000; Format: 48MS/32WS/32MD/32WD/32XD	Score: 22–20, 21–13	
31 October – 5 November	Malaysia Super 100 (Draw): Host: Kuala Lumpur, Malaysia; Venue: Stadium Titiwangsa; Level: Super 100; Prize: $100,000; Format: 48MS/32WS/32MD/32WD/32XD	(Thailand) Pitchamon Opatniputh	(South Korea) Kim Joo-eun
31 October – 5 November	Malaysia Super 100 (Draw): Host: Kuala Lumpur, Malaysia; Venue: Stadium Titiwangsa; Level: Super 100; Prize: $100,000; Format: 48MS/32WS/32MD/32WD/32XD	Score: 21–12, 24–22	
31 October – 5 November	Malaysia Super 100 (Draw): Host: Kuala Lumpur, Malaysia; Venue: Stadium Titiwangsa; Level: Super 100; Prize: $100,000; Format: 48MS/32WS/32MD/32WD/32XD	(Chinese Taipei) Chen Cheng-kuan (Chinese Taipei) Chen Sheng-fa	(Malaysia) Low Hang Yee (Malaysia) Ng Eng Cheong
31 October – 5 November	Malaysia Super 100 (Draw): Host: Kuala Lumpur, Malaysia; Venue: Stadium Titiwangsa; Level: Super 100; Prize: $100,000; Format: 48MS/32WS/32MD/32WD/32XD	Score: 23–21, 21–17	
31 October – 5 November	Malaysia Super 100 (Draw): Host: Kuala Lumpur, Malaysia; Venue: Stadium Titiwangsa; Level: Super 100; Prize: $100,000; Format: 48MS/32WS/32MD/32WD/32XD	(Thailand) Laksika Kanlaha (Thailand) Phataimas Muenwong	(Hong Kong) Lui Lok Lok (Hong Kong) Ng Wing Yung
31 October – 5 November	Malaysia Super 100 (Draw): Host: Kuala Lumpur, Malaysia; Venue: Stadium Titiwangsa; Level: Super 100; Prize: $100,000; Format: 48MS/32WS/32MD/32WD/32XD	Score: 16–21, 21–16, 21–16	
31 October – 5 November	Malaysia Super 100 (Draw): Host: Kuala Lumpur, Malaysia; Venue: Stadium Titiwangsa; Level: Super 100; Prize: $100,000; Format: 48MS/32WS/32MD/32WD/32XD	(Malaysia) Chan Peng Soon (Malaysia) Cheah Yee See	(Thailand) Pakkapon Teeraratsakul (Thailand) Phataimas Muenwong
31 October – 5 November	Malaysia Super 100 (Draw): Host: Kuala Lumpur, Malaysia; Venue: Stadium Titiwangsa; Level: Super 100; Prize: $100,000; Format: 48MS/32WS/32MD/32WD/32XD	Score: 21–9, 17–21, 21–10	

=== November ===
Date	Tournament	Champions	Runners-up
7–12 November	Korea Masters (Draw): Host: Gwangju, South Korea; Venue: Gwangju Women's University Stadium; Level: Super 300; Prize: $210,000; Format: 32MS/32WS/32MD/32WD/32XD	(Japan) Kento Momota	(Japan) Koki Watanabe
7–12 November	Korea Masters (Draw): Host: Gwangju, South Korea; Venue: Gwangju Women's University Stadium; Level: Super 300; Prize: $210,000; Format: 32MS/32WS/32MD/32WD/32XD	Score: 21–16, 21–15	
7–12 November	Korea Masters (Draw): Host: Gwangju, South Korea; Venue: Gwangju Women's University Stadium; Level: Super 300; Prize: $210,000; Format: 32MS/32WS/32MD/32WD/32XD	(South Korea) Kim Ga-eun	(Japan) Tomoka Miyazaki
7–12 November	Korea Masters (Draw): Host: Gwangju, South Korea; Venue: Gwangju Women's University Stadium; Level: Super 300; Prize: $210,000; Format: 32MS/32WS/32MD/32WD/32XD	Score: 19–21, 21–17, 21–12	
7–12 November	Korea Masters (Draw): Host: Gwangju, South Korea; Venue: Gwangju Women's University Stadium; Level: Super 300; Prize: $210,000; Format: 32MS/32WS/32MD/32WD/32XD	(Chinese Taipei) Lee Jhe-huei (Chinese Taipei) Yang Po-hsuan	(Chinese Taipei) Lee Yang (Chinese Taipei) Wang Chi-lin
7–12 November	Korea Masters (Draw): Host: Gwangju, South Korea; Venue: Gwangju Women's University Stadium; Level: Super 300; Prize: $210,000; Format: 32MS/32WS/32MD/32WD/32XD	Score: 21–17, 21–19	
7–12 November	Korea Masters (Draw): Host: Gwangju, South Korea; Venue: Gwangju Women's University Stadium; Level: Super 300; Prize: $210,000; Format: 32MS/32WS/32MD/32WD/32XD	(South Korea) Jeong Na-eun (South Korea) Kim Hye-jeong	(Japan) Rui Hirokami (Japan) Yuna Kato
7–12 November	Korea Masters (Draw): Host: Gwangju, South Korea; Venue: Gwangju Women's University Stadium; Level: Super 300; Prize: $210,000; Format: 32MS/32WS/32MD/32WD/32XD	Score: 21–12, 21–19	
7–12 November	Korea Masters (Draw): Host: Gwangju, South Korea; Venue: Gwangju Women's University Stadium; Level: Super 300; Prize: $210,000; Format: 32MS/32WS/32MD/32WD/32XD	(South Korea) Seo Seung-jae (South Korea) Chae Yoo-jung	(China) Jiang Zhenbang (China) Wei Yaxin
7–12 November	Korea Masters (Draw): Host: Gwangju, South Korea; Venue: Gwangju Women's University Stadium; Level: Super 300; Prize: $210,000; Format: 32MS/32WS/32MD/32WD/32XD	Score: 21–14, 21–15	
14–19 November	Japan Masters (Draw): Host: Kumamoto, Japan; Venue: Kumamoto Prefectural Gymnasium; Level: Super 500; Prize: $420,000; Format: 32MS/32WS/32MD/32WD/32XD	(Denmark) Viktor Axelsen	(China) Shi Yuqi
14–19 November	Japan Masters (Draw): Host: Kumamoto, Japan; Venue: Kumamoto Prefectural Gymnasium; Level: Super 500; Prize: $420,000; Format: 32MS/32WS/32MD/32WD/32XD	Score: 22–20, 21–17	
14–19 November	Japan Masters (Draw): Host: Kumamoto, Japan; Venue: Kumamoto Prefectural Gymnasium; Level: Super 500; Prize: $420,000; Format: 32MS/32WS/32MD/32WD/32XD	(Indonesia) Gregoria Mariska Tunjung	(China) Chen Yufei
14–19 November	Japan Masters (Draw): Host: Kumamoto, Japan; Venue: Kumamoto Prefectural Gymnasium; Level: Super 500; Prize: $420,000; Format: 32MS/32WS/32MD/32WD/32XD	Score: 21–12, 21–12	
14–19 November	Japan Masters (Draw): Host: Kumamoto, Japan; Venue: Kumamoto Prefectural Gymnasium; Level: Super 500; Prize: $420,000; Format: 32MS/32WS/32MD/32WD/32XD	(China) He Jiting (China) Ren Xiangyu	(China) Liu Yuchen (China) Ou Xuanyi
14–19 November	Japan Masters (Draw): Host: Kumamoto, Japan; Venue: Kumamoto Prefectural Gymnasium; Level: Super 500; Prize: $420,000; Format: 32MS/32WS/32MD/32WD/32XD	Score: 21–14, 15–21, 21–15	
14–19 November	Japan Masters (Draw): Host: Kumamoto, Japan; Venue: Kumamoto Prefectural Gymnasium; Level: Super 500; Prize: $420,000; Format: 32MS/32WS/32MD/32WD/32XD	(China) Zhang Shuxian (China) Zheng Yu	(China) Liu Shengshu (China) Tan Ning
14–19 November	Japan Masters (Draw): Host: Kumamoto, Japan; Venue: Kumamoto Prefectural Gymnasium; Level: Super 500; Prize: $420,000; Format: 32MS/32WS/32MD/32WD/32XD	Score: 12–21, 21–12, 21–17	
14–19 November	Japan Masters (Draw): Host: Kumamoto, Japan; Venue: Kumamoto Prefectural Gymnasium; Level: Super 500; Prize: $420,000; Format: 32MS/32WS/32MD/32WD/32XD	(China) Zheng Siwei (China) Huang Yaqiong	(China) Feng Yanzhe (China) Huang Dongping
14–19 November	Japan Masters (Draw): Host: Kumamoto, Japan; Venue: Kumamoto Prefectural Gymnasium; Level: Super 500; Prize: $420,000; Format: 32MS/32WS/32MD/32WD/32XD	Score: 25–23, 21–9	
21–26 November	China Masters (Draw): Host: Shenzhen, China; Venue: Shenzhen Bay Gymnasium; Level: Super 750; Prize: $1,000,000; Format: 32MS/32WS/32MD/32WD/32XD	(Japan) Kodai Naraoka	(Japan) Kenta Nishimoto
21–26 November	China Masters (Draw): Host: Shenzhen, China; Venue: Shenzhen Bay Gymnasium; Level: Super 750; Prize: $1,000,000; Format: 32MS/32WS/32MD/32WD/32XD	Score: 21–13, 21–13	
21–26 November	China Masters (Draw): Host: Shenzhen, China; Venue: Shenzhen Bay Gymnasium; Level: Super 750; Prize: $1,000,000; Format: 32MS/32WS/32MD/32WD/32XD	(China) Chen Yufei	(China) Han Yue
21–26 November	China Masters (Draw): Host: Shenzhen, China; Venue: Shenzhen Bay Gymnasium; Level: Super 750; Prize: $1,000,000; Format: 32MS/32WS/32MD/32WD/32XD	Score: 18–21, 21–4^{r}	
21–26 November	China Masters (Draw): Host: Shenzhen, China; Venue: Shenzhen Bay Gymnasium; Level: Super 750; Prize: $1,000,000; Format: 32MS/32WS/32MD/32WD/32XD	(China) Liang Weikeng (China) Wang Chang	(India) Satwiksairaj Rankireddy (India) Chirag Shetty
21–26 November	China Masters (Draw): Host: Shenzhen, China; Venue: Shenzhen Bay Gymnasium; Level: Super 750; Prize: $1,000,000; Format: 32MS/32WS/32MD/32WD/32XD	Score: 21–19, 18–21, 21–19	
21–26 November	China Masters (Draw): Host: Shenzhen, China; Venue: Shenzhen Bay Gymnasium; Level: Super 750; Prize: $1,000,000; Format: 32MS/32WS/32MD/32WD/32XD	(Japan) Nami Matsuyama (Japan) Chiharu Shida	(Japan) Yuki Fukushima (Japan) Sayaka Hirota
21–26 November	China Masters (Draw): Host: Shenzhen, China; Venue: Shenzhen Bay Gymnasium; Level: Super 750; Prize: $1,000,000; Format: 32MS/32WS/32MD/32WD/32XD	Score: 21–18, 21–11	
21–26 November	China Masters (Draw): Host: Shenzhen, China; Venue: Shenzhen Bay Gymnasium; Level: Super 750; Prize: $1,000,000; Format: 32MS/32WS/32MD/32WD/32XD	(China) Zheng Siwei (China) Huang Yaqiong	(South Korea) Seo Seung-jae (South Korea) Chae Yoo-jung
21–26 November	China Masters (Draw): Host: Shenzhen, China; Venue: Shenzhen Bay Gymnasium; Level: Super 750; Prize: $1,000,000; Format: 32MS/32WS/32MD/32WD/32XD	Score: 21–10, 21–11	
28 November – 3 December	Syed Modi International (Draw): Host: Lucknow, India; Venue: BBD U.P. Badminton Academy; Level: Super 300; Prize: $210,000; Format: 32MS/32WS/32MD/32WD/32XD	(Chinese Taipei) Chi Yu-jen	(Japan) Kenta Nishimoto
28 November – 3 December	Syed Modi International (Draw): Host: Lucknow, India; Venue: BBD U.P. Badminton Academy; Level: Super 300; Prize: $210,000; Format: 32MS/32WS/32MD/32WD/32XD	Score: 20–22, 21–12, 21–17	
28 November – 3 December	Syed Modi International (Draw): Host: Lucknow, India; Venue: BBD U.P. Badminton Academy; Level: Super 300; Prize: $210,000; Format: 32MS/32WS/32MD/32WD/32XD	(Japan) Nozomi Okuhara	(Denmark) Line Kjærsfeldt
28 November – 3 December	Syed Modi International (Draw): Host: Lucknow, India; Venue: BBD U.P. Badminton Academy; Level: Super 300; Prize: $210,000; Format: 32MS/32WS/32MD/32WD/32XD	Score: 21–19, 21–16	
28 November – 3 December	Syed Modi International (Draw): Host: Lucknow, India; Venue: BBD U.P. Badminton Academy; Level: Super 300; Prize: $210,000; Format: 32MS/32WS/32MD/32WD/32XD	(Malaysia) Choong Hon Jian (Malaysia) Muhammad Haikal	(Japan) Akira Koga (Japan) Taichi Saito
28 November – 3 December	Syed Modi International (Draw): Host: Lucknow, India; Venue: BBD U.P. Badminton Academy; Level: Super 300; Prize: $210,000; Format: 32MS/32WS/32MD/32WD/32XD	Score: 18–21, 21–18, 21–16	
28 November – 3 December	Syed Modi International (Draw): Host: Lucknow, India; Venue: BBD U.P. Badminton Academy; Level: Super 300; Prize: $210,000; Format: 32MS/32WS/32MD/32WD/32XD	(Japan) Rin Iwanaga (Japan) Kie Nakanishi	(India) Tanisha Crasto (India) Ashwini Ponnappa
28 November – 3 December	Syed Modi International (Draw): Host: Lucknow, India; Venue: BBD U.P. Badminton Academy; Level: Super 300; Prize: $210,000; Format: 32MS/32WS/32MD/32WD/32XD	Score: 21–14, 17–21, 21–15	
28 November – 3 December	Syed Modi International (Draw): Host: Lucknow, India; Venue: BBD U.P. Badminton Academy; Level: Super 300; Prize: $210,000; Format: 32MS/32WS/32MD/32WD/32XD	(Indonesia) Dejan Ferdinansyah (Indonesia) Gloria Emanuelle Widjaja	(Japan) Yuki Kaneko (Japan) Misaki Matsutomo
28 November – 3 December	Syed Modi International (Draw): Host: Lucknow, India; Venue: BBD U.P. Badminton Academy; Level: Super 300; Prize: $210,000; Format: 32MS/32WS/32MD/32WD/32XD	Score: 20–22, 21–19, 25–23	

=== December ===
Date	Tournament	Champions	Runners-up
5–10 December	Guwahati Masters (Draw): Host: Guwahati, India; Venue: Saru Sajai Indoor Sports Complex; Level: Super 100; Prize: $100,000; Format: 48MS/32WS/32MD/32WD/32XD	(Indonesia) Yohanes Saut Marcellyno	(Indonesia) Alvi Wijaya Chairullah
5–10 December	Guwahati Masters (Draw): Host: Guwahati, India; Venue: Saru Sajai Indoor Sports Complex; Level: Super 100; Prize: $100,000; Format: 48MS/32WS/32MD/32WD/32XD	Score: 21–12, 21–17	
5–10 December	Guwahati Masters (Draw): Host: Guwahati, India; Venue: Saru Sajai Indoor Sports Complex; Level: Super 100; Prize: $100,000; Format: 48MS/32WS/32MD/32WD/32XD	(Thailand) Lalinrat Chaiwan	(Denmark) Line Christophersen
5–10 December	Guwahati Masters (Draw): Host: Guwahati, India; Venue: Saru Sajai Indoor Sports Complex; Level: Super 100; Prize: $100,000; Format: 48MS/32WS/32MD/32WD/32XD	Score: 21–14, 17–21, 21–16	
5–10 December	Guwahati Masters (Draw): Host: Guwahati, India; Venue: Saru Sajai Indoor Sports Complex; Level: Super 100; Prize: $100,000; Format: 48MS/32WS/32MD/32WD/32XD	(Malaysia) Choong Hon Jian (Malaysia) Muhammad Haikal	(Chinese Taipei) Lin Bing-wei (Chinese Taipei) Su Ching-heng
5–10 December	Guwahati Masters (Draw): Host: Guwahati, India; Venue: Saru Sajai Indoor Sports Complex; Level: Super 100; Prize: $100,000; Format: 48MS/32WS/32MD/32WD/32XD	Score: 21–17, 23–21	
5–10 December	Guwahati Masters (Draw): Host: Guwahati, India; Venue: Saru Sajai Indoor Sports Complex; Level: Super 100; Prize: $100,000; Format: 48MS/32WS/32MD/32WD/32XD	(India) Tanisha Crasto (India) Ashwini Ponnappa	(Chinese Taipei) Sung Shuo-yun (Chinese Taipei) Yu Chien-hui
5–10 December	Guwahati Masters (Draw): Host: Guwahati, India; Venue: Saru Sajai Indoor Sports Complex; Level: Super 100; Prize: $100,000; Format: 48MS/32WS/32MD/32WD/32XD	Score: 21–13, 21–19	
5–10 December	Guwahati Masters (Draw): Host: Guwahati, India; Venue: Saru Sajai Indoor Sports Complex; Level: Super 100; Prize: $100,000; Format: 48MS/32WS/32MD/32WD/32XD	(Singapore) Terry Hee (Singapore) Jessica Tan	(Denmark) Mads Vestergaard (Denmark) Christine Busch
5–10 December	Guwahati Masters (Draw): Host: Guwahati, India; Venue: Saru Sajai Indoor Sports Complex; Level: Super 100; Prize: $100,000; Format: 48MS/32WS/32MD/32WD/32XD	Score: 21–19, 21–11	
13–17 December	HSBC BWF World Tour Finals (Draw): Host: Hangzhou, China; Venue: Hangzhou Olympic Sports Center; Level: World Tour Finals; Prize: $2,500,000; Format: 8MS/8WS/8MD/8WD/8XD	(Denmark) Viktor Axelsen	(China) Shi Yuqi
13–17 December	HSBC BWF World Tour Finals (Draw): Host: Hangzhou, China; Venue: Hangzhou Olympic Sports Center; Level: World Tour Finals; Prize: $2,500,000; Format: 8MS/8WS/8MD/8WD/8XD	Score: 21–11, 21–12	
13–17 December	HSBC BWF World Tour Finals (Draw): Host: Hangzhou, China; Venue: Hangzhou Olympic Sports Center; Level: World Tour Finals; Prize: $2,500,000; Format: 8MS/8WS/8MD/8WD/8XD	(Chinese Taipei) Tai Tzu-ying	(Spain) Carolina Marín
13–17 December	HSBC BWF World Tour Finals (Draw): Host: Hangzhou, China; Venue: Hangzhou Olympic Sports Center; Level: World Tour Finals; Prize: $2,500,000; Format: 8MS/8WS/8MD/8WD/8XD	Score: 12–21, 21–14, 21–18	
13–17 December	HSBC BWF World Tour Finals (Draw): Host: Hangzhou, China; Venue: Hangzhou Olympic Sports Center; Level: World Tour Finals; Prize: $2,500,000; Format: 8MS/8WS/8MD/8WD/8XD	(South Korea) Kang Min-hyuk (South Korea) Seo Seung-jae	(China) Liang Weikeng (China) Wang Chang
13–17 December	HSBC BWF World Tour Finals (Draw): Host: Hangzhou, China; Venue: Hangzhou Olympic Sports Center; Level: World Tour Finals; Prize: $2,500,000; Format: 8MS/8WS/8MD/8WD/8XD	Score: 21–17, 22–20	
13–17 December	HSBC BWF World Tour Finals (Draw): Host: Hangzhou, China; Venue: Hangzhou Olympic Sports Center; Level: World Tour Finals; Prize: $2,500,000; Format: 8MS/8WS/8MD/8WD/8XD	(China) Chen Qingchen (China) Jia Yifan	(South Korea) Baek Ha-na (South Korea) Lee So-hee
13–17 December	HSBC BWF World Tour Finals (Draw): Host: Hangzhou, China; Venue: Hangzhou Olympic Sports Center; Level: World Tour Finals; Prize: $2,500,000; Format: 8MS/8WS/8MD/8WD/8XD	Score: 21–16, 21–16	
13–17 December	HSBC BWF World Tour Finals (Draw): Host: Hangzhou, China; Venue: Hangzhou Olympic Sports Center; Level: World Tour Finals; Prize: $2,500,000; Format: 8MS/8WS/8MD/8WD/8XD	(China) Zheng Siwei (China) Huang Yaqiong	(China) Feng Yanzhe (China) Huang Dongping
13–17 December	HSBC BWF World Tour Finals (Draw): Host: Hangzhou, China; Venue: Hangzhou Olympic Sports Center; Level: World Tour Finals; Prize: $2,500,000; Format: 8MS/8WS/8MD/8WD/8XD	Score: 21–11, 21–18	
13–17 December	Odisha Masters (Draw): Host: Cuttack, India; Venue: Jawaharlal Nehru Indoor Stadium; Level: Super 100; Prize: $100,000; Format: 48MS/32WS/32MD/32WD/32XD	(India) Sathish Kumar Karunakaran	(India) Ayush Shetty
13–17 December	Odisha Masters (Draw): Host: Cuttack, India; Venue: Jawaharlal Nehru Indoor Stadium; Level: Super 100; Prize: $100,000; Format: 48MS/32WS/32MD/32WD/32XD	Score: 21–18, 19–21, 21–14	
13–17 December	Odisha Masters (Draw): Host: Cuttack, India; Venue: Jawaharlal Nehru Indoor Stadium; Level: Super 100; Prize: $100,000; Format: 48MS/32WS/32MD/32WD/32XD	(Japan) Nozomi Okuhara	(Hong Kong) Lo Sin Yan
13–17 December	Odisha Masters (Draw): Host: Cuttack, India; Venue: Jawaharlal Nehru Indoor Stadium; Level: Super 100; Prize: $100,000; Format: 48MS/32WS/32MD/32WD/32XD	Score: 21–7, 21–23, 22–20	
13–17 December	Odisha Masters (Draw): Host: Cuttack, India; Venue: Jawaharlal Nehru Indoor Stadium; Level: Super 100; Prize: $100,000; Format: 48MS/32WS/32MD/32WD/32XD	(Chinese Taipei) Lin Bing-wei (Chinese Taipei) Su Ching-heng	(India) Krishna Prasad Garaga (India) K. Sai Pratheek
13–17 December	Odisha Masters (Draw): Host: Cuttack, India; Venue: Jawaharlal Nehru Indoor Stadium; Level: Super 100; Prize: $100,000; Format: 48MS/32WS/32MD/32WD/32XD	Score: 20–22, 21–18, 21–17	
13–17 December	Odisha Masters (Draw): Host: Cuttack, India; Venue: Jawaharlal Nehru Indoor Stadium; Level: Super 100; Prize: $100,000; Format: 48MS/32WS/32MD/32WD/32XD	(Indonesia) Meilysa Trias Puspita Sari (Indonesia) Rachel Allessya Rose	(India) Tanisha Crasto (India) Ashwini Ponnappa
13–17 December	Odisha Masters (Draw): Host: Cuttack, India; Venue: Jawaharlal Nehru Indoor Stadium; Level: Super 100; Prize: $100,000; Format: 48MS/32WS/32MD/32WD/32XD	Score: 21–14, 21–17	
13–17 December	Odisha Masters (Draw): Host: Cuttack, India; Venue: Jawaharlal Nehru Indoor Stadium; Level: Super 100; Prize: $100,000; Format: 48MS/32WS/32MD/32WD/32XD	(India) Dhruv Kapila (India) Tanisha Crasto	(Singapore) Terry Hee (Singapore) Jessica Tan
13–17 December	Odisha Masters (Draw): Host: Cuttack, India; Venue: Jawaharlal Nehru Indoor Stadium; Level: Super 100; Prize: $100,000; Format: 48MS/32WS/32MD/32WD/32XD	Score: 17–21, 21–19, 23–21	

== Statistics ==
=== Performance by countries ===
Below are the 2023 BWF World Tour performances by countries. Only countries who have won a title are listed:

==== BWF World Tour ====
Rank	Team	BWTF	Super 1000				Super 750						Super 500									Super 300										Total
Rank	Team	CHN	MAS	ENG	INA	CHN	IND	SGP	JPN	DEN	FRA	CHN	INA	MAS	THA	CAN	KOR	AUS	HKG	FIN	JPN	THA	GER I	SUI	ESP	FRA	TPE	USA	GER II	KOR	IND	Total
1	China	2	2	2	2	2	1	1		4	3	3	2		1		2	2	1	3	3	2	1	1	2	1		2	2			47
2	South Korea	1		2	1	2	1	1	2				1	2	3		1	2					2				1			3		25
3	Japan		1				2	1	1			2		1		3			1				1	2	1	1				1	2	20
4	Indonesia		1	1				1			1		2						2		1	1			1		1				1	13
4	Denmark	1	1		1	1		1	1		1					1	1		1	1	1				1							13
6	Chinese Taipei	1							1													1					1	1	1	1	1	8
7	Malaysia									1										1						1	2	1			1	7
8	India				1									1		1	1							1		1						6
8	Thailand						1							1	1							1		1				1				6
10	Hong Kong																						1						1			2
10	United States																	1											1			2
12	Spain																									1						1

==== BWF Tour Super 100 ====
Rank	Team	CHN	INA I	VIE	TPE	UAE	INA II	MAS	IND I	IND II	Total
1	Chinese Taipei	1		2	2			1		1	7
1	Indonesia		3				2		1	1	7
1	Japan			2	1		3			1	7
4	India		1			2			1	2	6
4	Malaysia		1		1	1		2	1		6
6	China	4									4
7	Thailand							2	1		3
8	Denmark					2					2
9	Australia				1						1
9	Singapore								1		1
9	Vietnam			1							1

=== Performance by categories ===
Tables were calculated after BWF World Tour Finals and Odisha Masters.

==== Men's singles ====
Rank	Player	BWTF	1000	750	500	300	100	Total
1	(Denmark) Viktor Axelsen	1	3	1	1			6
2	(Indonesia) Jonatan Christie			1	2			3
3	(China) Li Shifeng		1			1		2
4	(China) Weng Hongyang			1	1			2
4	(Thailand) Kunlavut Vitidsarn			1	1			2
6	(Chinese Taipei) Lin Chun-yi					1	1	2
7	(Indonesia) Anthony Sinisuka Ginting			1				1
7	(Japan) Kodai Naraoka			1				1
9	(Denmark) Anders Antonsen				1			1
9	(India) Prannoy H. S.				1			1
9	(India) Lakshya Sen				1			1
9	(Malaysia) Lee Zii Jia				1			1
13	(Hong Kong) Ng Ka Long					1		1
13	(Indonesia) Chico Aura Dwi Wardoyo					1		1
13	(India) Priyanshu Rajawat					1		1
13	(Japan) Kenta Nishimoto					1		1
13	(Japan) Koki Watanabe					1		1
13	(Japan) Kento Momota					1		1
13	(Chinese Taipei) Chou Tien-chen					1		1
13	(Chinese Taipei) Chi Yu-jen	.				1		1
21	(China) Sun Feixiang						1	1
21	(Denmark) Mads Christophersen						1	1
21	(Indonesia) Yohanes Saut Marcellyno						1	1
21	(India) Kiran George						1	1
21	(India) Sathish Kumar Karunakaran						1	1
21	(Japan) Takuma Obayashi						1	1
21	(Malaysia) Leong Jun Hao						1	1
21	(Chinese Taipei) Huang Yu-kai						1	1

==== Women's singles ====
Rank	Player	BWTF	1000	750	500	300	100	Total
1	(South Korea) An Se-young		2	3	3			8
2	(Japan) Akane Yamaguchi		1		3	1		5
3	(China) Chen Yufei		1	3				4
4	(Chinese Taipei) Tai Tzu-ying	1				1		2
5	(Indonesia) Gregoria Mariska Tunjung				1	1		2
5	(United States) Beiwen Zhang				1	1		2
7	(Japan) Nozomi Okuhara					1	1	2
8	(China) Han Yue				1			1
8	(China) Zhang Yiman					1		1
8	(Spain) Carolina Marín					1		1
8	(South Korea) Kim Ga-eun					1		1
8	(Thailand) Pornpawee Chochuwong					1		1
8	(Thailand) Supanida Katethong					1		1
14	(Indonesia) Ester Nurumi Tri Wardoyo						1	1
14	(India) Unnati Hooda						1	1
14	(Japan) Tomoka Miyazaki						1	1
14	(Thailand) Pitchamon Opatniputh						1	1
14	(Thailand) Lalinrat Chaiwan						1	1
14	(Chinese Taipei) Liang Ting-yu						1	1
14	(Chinese Taipei) Lin Hsiang-ti						1	1
14	(Vietnam) Nguyễn Thùy Linh						1	1

==== Men's doubles ====
Rank	Player	BWTF	1000	750	500	300	100	Total
1	(China) Liang Weikeng		1	2	1			4
1	(China) Wang Chang		1	2	1			4
3	(Denmark) Kim Astrup			1	3			4
3	(Denmark) Anders Skaarup Rasmussen			1	3			4
5	(South Korea) Kang Min-hyuk	1			2			3
5	(South Korea) Seo Seung-jae	1			2			3
7	(India) Satwiksairaj Rankireddy		1		1	1		3
7	(India) Chirag Shetty		1		1	1		3
9	(Malaysia) Goh Sze Fei					1	2	3
9	(Malaysia) Nur Izzuddin					1	2	3
11	(Indonesia) Fajar Alfian		2					2
11	(Indonesia) Muhammad Rian Ardianto		2					2
13	(China) He Jiting				1	1		2
13	(Indonesia) Leo Rolly Carnando				1	1		2
13	(Indonesia) Daniel Marthin				1	1		2
16	(China) Chen Boyang					1	1	2
16	(China) Liu Yi					1	1	2
16	(Malaysia) Choong Hon Jian					1	1	2
16	(Malaysia) Muhammad Haikal					1	1	2
20	(Japan) Kenya Mitsuhashi						2	2
20	(Japan) Hiroki Okamura						2	2
22	(Japan) Takuro Hoki			1				1
22	(Japan) Yugo Kobayashi			1				1
22	(Malaysia) Aaron Chia			1				1
22	(Malaysia) Soh Wooi Yik			1				1
22	(Chinese Taipei) Lee Yang			1				1
22	(Chinese Taipei) Wang Chi-lin			1				1
28	(China) Ren Xiangyu				1			1
29	(China) Zhou Haodong					1		1
29	(China) Liu Yuchen					1		1
29	(China) Ou Xuanyi					1		1
29	(South Korea) Choi Sol-gyu					1		1
29	(South Korea) Kim Won-ho					1		1
29	(Malaysia) Man Wei Chong					1		1
29	(Malaysia) Tee Kai Wun					1		1
29	(Chinese Taipei) Lee Jhe-huei					1		1
29	(Chinese Taipei) Yang Po-hsuan					1		1
38	(Indonesia) Sabar Karyaman Gutama						1	1
38	(Indonesia) Muhammad Reza Pahlevi Isfahani						1	1
38	(Chinese Taipei) Chen Cheng-kuan						1	1
38	(Chinese Taipei) Chen Sheng-fa						1	1
38	(Chinese Taipei) Lin Bing-wei						1	1
38	(Chinese Taipei) Su Ching-heng						1	1

==== Women's doubles ====
Rank	Player	BWTF	1000	750	500	300	100	Total
1	(China) Chen Qingchen	1	2	2	1			6
1	(China) Jia Yifan	1	2	2	1			6
3	(China) Liu Shengshu			1	2	2		5
4	(South Korea) Kim So-yeong		1	1	2			4
4	(South Korea) Kong Hee-yong		1	1	2			4
6	(China) Tan Ning			1	1	2		4
7	(South Korea) Baek Ha-na		1		1	1		3
7	(South Korea) Lee So-hee		1		1	1		3
9	(Japan) Nami Matsuyama			2	1			3
9	(Japan) Chiharu Shida			2	1			3
11	(China) Zhang Shuxian				2	1		3
12	(China) Zheng Yu				1	1		2
13	(Japan) Rena Miyaura					2		2
13	(Japan) Ayako Sakuramoto					2		2
15	(India) Tanisha Crasto						2	2
15	(India) Ashwini Ponnappa						2	2
15	(Indonesia) Lanny Tria Mayasari						2	2
15	(Indonesia) Ribka Sugiarto						2	2
19	(Indonesia) Apriyani Rahayu				1			1
19	(Indonesia) Siti Fadia Silva Ramadhanti				1			1
21	(Japan) Rin Iwanaga					1		1
21	(Japan) Kie Nakanishi					1		1
21	(South Korea) Lee Yu-lim					1		1
21	(South Korea) Shin Seung-chan					1		1
21	(South Korea) Jeong Na-eun					1		1
21	(South Korea) Kim Hye-jeong					1		1
21	(Thailand) Benyapa Aimsaard					1		1
21	(Thailand) Nuntakarn Aimsaard					1		1
29	(Australia) Setyana Mapasa						1	1
29	(Australia) Angela Yu						1	1
29	(China) Chen Xiaofei						1	1
29	(China) Feng Xueying						1	1
29	(Indonesia) Meilysa Trias Puspitasari						1	1
29	(Indonesia) Rachel Allessya Rose						1	1
29	(Thailand) Laksika Kanlaha						1	1
29	(Thailand) Phataimas Muenwong						1	1
29	(Chinese Taipei) Hsieh Pei-shan						1	1
29	(Chinese Taipei) Tseng Yu-chi						1	1

==== Mixed doubles ====
Rank	Player	BWTF	1000	750	500	300	100	Total
1	(China) Feng Yanzhe			1	4	2		7
1	(China) Huang Dongping			1	4	2		7
3	(China) Huang Yaqiong	1	3	1	1			6
3	(China) Zheng Siwei	1	3	1	1			6
5	(China) Wei Yaxin			1	1	1	1	4
6	(China) Jiang Zhenbang			1		1	1	3
7	(South Korea) Seo Seung-jae		1			1		2
7	(South Korea) Chae Yoo-jung		1			1		2
9	(Japan) Arisa Higashino			2				2
9	(Japan) Yuta Watanabe			2				2
11	(Denmark) Alexandra Bøje			1		1		2
11	(Denmark) Mathias Christiansen			1		1		2
13	(Malaysia) Chen Tang Jie					2		2
13	(Malaysia) Toh Ee Wei					2		2
15	(Japan) Hiroki Nishi						2	2
15	(Japan) Akari Sato						2	2
17	(China) Guo Xinwa				1			1
17	(Japan) Hiroki Midorikawa				1			1
17	(Japan) Natsu Saito				1			1
17	(South Korea) Jeong Na-eun				1			1
17	(South Korea) Kim Won-ho				1			1
17	(Thailand) Dechapol Puavaranukroh				1			1
17	(Thailand) Sapsiree Taerattanachai				1			1
24	(Hong Kong) Tang Chun Man					1		1
24	(Hong Kong) Tse Ying Suet					1		1
24	(Indonesia) Dejan Ferdinansyah					1		1
24	(Indonesia) Gloria Emanuelle Widjaja					1		1
24	(Chinese Taipei) Ye Hong-wei					1		1
24	(Chinese Taipei) Lee Chia-hsin					1		1
30	(Denmark) Mads Vestergaard						1	1
30	(Denmark) Christine Busch						1	1
30	(Indonesia) Jafar Hidayatullah						1	1
30	(Indonesia) Aisyah Salsabila Putri Pranata						1	1
30	(India) Dhruv Kapila						1	1
30	(India) Tanisha Crasto						1	1
30	(Malaysia) Chan Peng Soon						1	1
30	(Malaysia) Cheah Yee See						1	1
30	(Malaysia) Yap Roy King						1	1
30	(Malaysia) Valeree Siow						1	1
30	(Singapore) Terry Hee						1	1
30	(Singapore) Jessica Tan						1	1

== World Tour Rankings ==
The points are calculated from the following levels:

- BWF World Tour Super 1000
- BWF World Tour Super 750
- BWF World Tour Super 500
- BWF World Tour Super 300
- BWF Tour Super 100

Information on Points, Won, Lost, and % columns were calculated after the China Masters.

Key

(D)C	(Defending) Champion
F	Finalists
SF	Semi-finalists
QF	Quarter-finalists
#R	Round 1/2/3
RR	Round Robin
Q#	Qualification Round 1/2
WD	Withdraw

=== Men's singles ===
The table below was based on the ranking of men's singles as of 28 November 2023.

Rankings		WR	Player		TP	Points	WTF		MAS	IND	INA	THA	GER	ENG	CHN	SUI	ESP	FRA	MAS	THA	SGP	INA	TPE	CAN	USA	KOR	JPN	AUS	CHN	INA	HKG	VIE	TPE	FIN	DEN	UAE	FRA	INA	GER	MAS	KOR	JPN	CHN	Won	Lost	%
Rankings		WR	Player		TP	Points	Eli	BWTF	1000	750	500	300	300	1000	100	300	300	300	500	500	750	1000	300	500	300	500	750	500	1000	100	500	100	100	500	750	100	750	100	300	100	300	500	750	Won	Lost	%
Qualified as World Championships winner
9	Steady	6	(Thailand)	Kunlavut Vitidsarn	14	75,840	✓	RR	SF	C	–	–	1R	2R	–	–	–	–	2R	C	SF	–	–	1R	F	–	QF	–	–	–	–	–	–	1R	1R	–	QF	–	–	–	–	–	2R	27	11	72.22%
Qualified by World Tour Finals Ranking
1	▲5	3	(Japan)	Kodai Naraoka	17	89,250	✓	RR	F	1R	1R	–	1R	QF	–	–	–	–	QF	–	SF	QF	–	SF	–	SF	SF	1R	QF	–	–	–	–	–	1R	–	QF	–	–	–	–	2R	C	32	16	66.67%
2	▼1	4	(Indonesia)	Jonatan Christie	14	86,810	✓	SF	2R	SF	C	–	–	1R	–	–	–	–	2R	–	1R	QF	–	–	–	–	F	2R	SF	–	C	–	–	–	1R	–	C	–	–	–	–	QF	–	32	11	74.42%
3	▲1	7	(China)	Shi Yuqi	17	86,430	✓	F	1R	2R	SF	SF	1R	F	–	1R	–	–	–	1R	QF	2R	–	–	–	SF	QF	–	SF	–	–	–	–	–	SF	–	QF	–	–	–	–	F	2R	32	17	65.31%
4	▼2	5	(China)	Li Shifeng	18	85,160	✓	RR	1R	QF	1R	SF	F	C	–	1R	–	–	2R	2R	QF	SF	–	F	C	–	1R	–	2R	–	–	–	–	–	1R	–	F	–	–	–	–	–	1R	35	16	68.63%
5	▼2	1	(Denmark)	Viktor Axelsen	11	84,450	✓	DC	DC	F	–	–	–	2R	–	SF	–	–	–	–	–	DC	–	–	–	–	C	–	C	–	1R	–	–	–	2R	–	1R	–	–	–	–	C	–	34	6	85.00%
6	▼1	2	(Indonesia)	Anthony Sinisuka Ginting	15	82,840	✓	RR	QF	SF	2R	–	–	QF	–	–	–	–	2R	–	DC	F	–	–	–	–	1R	QF	1R	–	SF	–	–	–	QF	–	QF	–	–	–	–	1R	2R	28	14	66.67%
7	Steady	11	(Denmark)	Anders Antonsen	18	78,110	✓	SF	2R	2R	2R	2R	–	SF	–	–	SF	1R	–	–	F	1R	–	–	–	C	2R	–	2R	–	2R	–	–	SF	2R	–	2R	–	–	–	–	QF	2R	29	17	63.04%
8	▲2	12	(Japan)	Kenta Nishimoto	22	77,570	✗	—N/a	QF	1R	2R	QF	QF	2R	–	–	C	2R	QF	–	1R	1R	QF	SF	–	QF	2R	1R	1R	–	F	–	–	–	QF	–	1R	–	–	–	–	1R	F	34	21	61.82%
10	▼2	15	(Malaysia)	Ng Tze Yong	21	73,180	✗	—N/a	2R	1R	2R	QF	–	QF	–	QF	–	–	1R	QF	2R	1R	–	–	–	QF	2R	QF	2R	–	SF	–	–	F	1R	–	SF	–	2R	–	–	2R	1R	28	21	57.14%
11	Steady	10	(Malaysia)	Lee Zii Jia	19	72,760	✗	—N/a	1R	2R	2R	–	2R	SF	–	SF	–	–	2R	–	1R	1R	–	–	–	1R	1R	SF	1R	–	2R	–	–	C	F	–	2R	–	–	–	–	1R	QF	26	18	59.09%
12	▲2	8	(India)	Prannoy H. S.	13	71,020	✗	—N/a	QF	1R	1R	–	–	2R	–	2R	–	–	C	–	1R	SF	QF	–	–	–	QF	–	1R	–	–	–	–	–	–	–	–	–	–	–	–	2R	QF	19	12	61.29%
13	▼1	14	(Chinese Taipei)	Chou Tien-chen	22	68,620	✗	—N/a	2R	QF	1R	–	–	1R	–	F	–	–	1R	2R	2R	QF	2R	–	–	2R	1R	QF	1R	–	1R	–	–	2R	2R	–	2R	–	C	–	1R	SF	1R	26	21	55.32%
14	▼1	19	(China)	Weng Hongyang	21	68,450	✗	—N/a	1R	1R	1R	1R	–	QF	–	1R	–	–	F	2R	2R	1R	–	1R	2R	–	2R	C	1R	–	1R	–	–	2R	C	–	1R	–	–	–	–	2R	1R	22	19	53.66%
15	Steady	9	(Singapore)	Loh Kean Yew	17	66,810	✗	—N/a	QF	QF	2R	–	2R	1R	–	–	–	–	1R	–	2R	2R	–	–	–	F	1R	1R	QF	–	1R	–	–	–	QF	–	SF	–	–	–	–	1R	1R	19	17	52.78%
16	Steady	18	(Hong Kong)	Lee Cheuk Yiu	24	65,730	✗	—N/a	1R	1R	1R	QF	SF	1R	–	QF	–	–	1R	F	1R	1R	1R	2R	–	QF	2R	1R	2R	–	2R	–	–	–	SF	–	2R	–	F	–	–	1R	1R	25	23	52.08%
17	▲4	13	(Japan)	Kanta Tsuneyama	20	64,850	✗	—N/a	SF	–	QF	–	2R	1R	–	–	F	1R	1R	–	1R	1R	2R	1R	–	1R	2R	1R	QF	–	2R	–	–	SF	1R	–	–	–	–	–	–	1R	SF	21	20	51.22%
18	▼1	17	(India)	Lakshya Sen	19	64,760	✗	—N/a	1R	2R	QF	–	1R	2R	–	1R	–	–	2R	SF	1R	2R	–	C	SF	–	SF	1R	1R	–	–	–	–	–	1R	–	1R	–	–	–	–	1R	1R	20	17	54.05%
19	Steady	21	(Chinese Taipei)	Lin Chun-yi	23	64,210	✗	—N/a	–	–	1R	C	QF	–	–	2R	1R	1R	SF	1R	1R	1R	QF	1R	SF	–	1R	–	2R	–	1R	–	C	1R	2R	–	2R	–	–	–	QF	2R	QF	29	21	58.00%
20	Steady	16	(China)	Lu Guangzu	18	62,430	✗	—N/a	1R	1R	QF	–	QF	1R	–	–	–	–	1R	QF	2R	1R	–	–	–	QF	1R	–	F	–	1R	–	–	QF	2R	–	1R	–	–	–	–	2R	2R	19	17	52.78%
21	▼3	20	(Hong Kong)	Ng Ka Long	21	60,980	✗	—N/a	1R	1R	SF	F	C	1R	–	–	–	–	QF	2R	1R	2R	SF	2R	–	2R	1R	1R	1R	–	1R	–	–	–	1R	–	2R	–	2R	–	–	1R	–	22	21	51.16%

=== Women's singles ===
The table below was based on the ranking of women's singles as of 28 November 2023.

Rankings		WR	Player		TP	Points	WTF		MAS	IND	INA	THA	GER	ENG	CHN	SUI	ESP	FRA	MAS	THA	SGP	INA	TPE	CAN	USA	KOR	JPN	AUS	CHN	INA	HKG	VIE	TPE	FIN	DEN	UAE	FRA	INA	GER	MAS	KOR	JPN	CHN	Won	Lost	%
Rankings		WR	Player		TP	Points	Eli	BWTF	1000	750	500	300	300	1000	100	300	300	300	500	500	750	1000	300	500	300	500	750	500	1000	100	500	100	100	500	750	100	750	100	300	100	300	500	750	Won	Lost	%
Qualified as World Championships winner
1	Steady	1	(South Korea)	An Se-young	13	119,890	✓	SF	F	C	C	–	F	C	–	–	–	–	–	C	C	SF	–	–	–	DC	C	–	C	–	–	–	–	–	–	–	–	–	–	–	–	SF	2R	55	5	91.67%
Qualified by World Tour Finals Ranking
2	▲1	2	(China)	Chen Yufei	13	109,190	✓	SF	SF	QF	–	–	SF	F	–	–	–	–	–	–	SF	C	–	–	–	SF	2R	–	SF	–	–	–	–	–	C	–	C	–	–	–	–	F	DC	46	9	83.64%
3	▼1	3	(Japan)	Akane Yamaguchi	12	102,970	✗	—N/a	C	F	–	–	C	SF	–	–	–	–	C	–	F	QF	–	C	–	SF	QF	–	F	–	C	–	–	–	–	–	–	–	–	–	–	–	–	47	7	87.04%
4	▲1	4	(Chinese Taipei)	Tai Tzu-ying	14	94,020	✓	C	SF	–	–	–	–	SF	–	–	–	–	–	–	SF	QF	DC	–	–	F	SF	–	SF	–	1R	–	–	QF	QF	–	F	–	–	–	–	QF	2R	37	13	74.00%
5	▼1	5	(Spain)	Carolina Marín	15	91,970	✓	F	QF	QF	F	–	–	QF	–	–	SF	C	–	SF	2R	F	–	–	–	–	–	–	QF	–	QF	–	–	–	F	–	QF	–	–	–	–	QF	1R	38	14	73.08%
6	Steady	8	(China)	Han Yue	19	87,740	✓	RR	2R	2R	SF	F	1R	2R	–	2R	–	–	SF	QF	2R	1R	–	–	–	2R	QF	–	QF	–	QF	–	–	C	SF	–	QF	–	–	–	–	–	F	38	17	69.09%
7	Steady	6	(China)	He Bingjiao	14	85,600	✗	—N/a	1R	SF	2R	–	SF	QF	–	–	–	–	–	F	QF	QF	–	–	–	2R	F	–	QF	–	–	–	–	–	QF	–	SF	–	–	–	–	–	QF	31	13	70.45%
8	Steady	7	(Indonesia)	Gregoria Mariska Tunjung	17	80,340	✓	RR	2R	2R	QF	–	–	QF	–	SF	C	–	F	–	2R	1R	–	–	–	2R	SF	–	1R	–	SF	–	–	–	2R	–	1R	–	–	–	–	C	2R	33	15	68.75%
9	▲1	10	(China)	Wang Zhiyi	18	78,850	✗	—N/a	QF	2R	SF	–	QF	QF	–	1R	–	–	QF	2R	QF	2R	–	–	–	QF	2R	–	2R	–	QF	–	–	F	2R	–	2R	–	–	–	–	–	SF	31	18	63.27%
10	▼1	9	(United States)	Beiwen Zhang	20	78,230	✓	RR	1R	QF	2R	2R	–	2R	–	SF	QF	F	1R	–	1R	1R	F	SF	–	–	QF	C	1R	–	QF	–	–	1R	–	–	–	–	C	–	–	SF	–	37	18	67.27%
11	▲2	13	(South Korea)	Kim Ga-eun	22	70,650	✓	RR	1R	2R	1R	QF	QF	1R	–	QF	2R	–	2R	1R	1R	QF	1R	–	–	QF	2R	F	–	–	–	–	–	2R	1R	–	2R	–	–	–	C	2R	SF	28	21	57.14%
12	▼1	14	(Thailand)	Pornpawee Chochuwong	19	70,270	✗	—N/a	2R	QF	QF	–	QF	2R	–	C	–	–	2R	QF	1R	2R	–	–	–	1R	1R	1R	1R	–	2R	–	–	SF	2R	–	QF	–	SF	–	–	–	–	26	17	60.47%
13	▼1	15	(Thailand)	Supanida Katethong	21	69,800	✗	—N/a	–	SF	1R	SF	2R	1R	–	–	–	–	–	2R	QF	1R	QF	2R	C	–	2R	QF	1R	–	1R	–	–	2R	QF	–	QF	–	–	–	1R	QF	1R	26	20	56.52%
14	Steady	16	(China)	Zhang Yiman	19	68,420	✗	—N/a	1R	1R	1R	C	2R	2R	–	2R	–	–	QF	2R	1R	1R	–	–	–	QF	2R	–	2R	–	F	–	–	2R	QF	–	2R	–	–	–	–	–	QF	25	18	58.14%
15	Steady	12	(India)	P. V. Sindhu	17	64,990	✗	—N/a	1R	1R	–	–	–	1R	–	2R	F	–	SF	1R	1R	2R	–	SF	QF	1R	1R	QF	–	–	–	–	–	SF	SF	–	2R	–	–	–	–	–	–	22	16	57.89%
16	▲1	17	(Japan)	Aya Ohori	20	60,620	✗	—N/a	2R	1R	1R	–	1R	1R	–	–	–	1R	2R	1R	QF	1R	–	–	–	1R	2R	SF	2R	–	2R	–	–	–	1R	–	SF	–	2R	–	–	2R	2R	15	20	42.86%
17	▼1	11	(Thailand)	Ratchanok Intanon	13	59,960	✗	—N/a	–	2R	QF	–	–	1R	–	1R	–	–	1R	1R	2R	SF	–	F	SF	–	QF	SF	–	–	2R	–	–	–	–	–	–	–	–	–	–	–	–	19	12	61.29%

=== Men's doubles ===
The table below was based on the ranking of men's doubles as of 28 November 2023.

Rankings		WR	Player		TP	Points	WTF		MAS	IND	INA	THA	GER	ENG	CHN	SUI	ESP	FRA	MAS	THA	SGP	INA	TPE	CAN	USA	KOR	JPN	AUS	CHN	INA	HKG	VIE	TPE	FIN	DEN	UAE	FRA	INA	GER	MAS	KOR	JPN	CHN	Won	Lost	%
Rankings		WR	Player		TP	Points	Eli	BWTF	1000	750	500	300	300	1000	100	300	300	300	500	500	750	1000	300	500	300	500	750	500	1000	100	500	100	100	500	750	100	750	100	300	100	300	500	750	Won	Lost	%
Qualified as World Championships winner
3	▼2	6	(South Korea)	Kang Min-hyuk / Seo Seung-jae	18	91,900	✓	C	SF	SF	1R	–	F	1R	–	–	–	–	C	QF	1R	SF	–	–	–	SF	2R	C	SF	–	–	–	–	–	2R	–	QF	–	–	–	SF	2R	1R	39	16	70.91%
Qualified by World Tour Finals Ranking
1	▲1	1	(China)	Liang Weikeng / Wang Chang	14	100,740	✓	F	F	C	2R	–	1R	SF	–	–	–	–	–	C	F	QF	–	–	–	SF	2R	–	C	–	–	–	–	–	1R	–	2R	–	–	–	–	–	C	39	10	79.59%
2	Steady	5	(Indonesia)	Fajar Alfian / Muhammad Rian Ardianto	16	92,400	✓	SF	C	SF	QF	–	–	C	–	–	QF	–	1R	–	1R	QF	–	–	–	F	SF	QF	1R	–	2R	–	–	–	SF	–	QF	–	–	–	–	–	2R	35	14	71.43%
4	▲1	3	(Malaysia)	Aaron Chia / Soh Wooi Yik	17	88,940	✓	RR	2R	F	QF	–	1R	1R	–	2R	–	–	QF	–	SF	F	–	–	–	2R	QF	QF	F	–	–	–	–	1R	C	–	–	–	–	–	–	2R	2R	33	16	67.35%
5	▼1	7	(Japan)	Takuro Hoki / Yugo Kobayashi	16	88,400	✓	RR	1R	1R	SF	–	QF	QF	–	–	–	–	SF	–	C	2R	–	QF	–	QF	F	F	SF	–	–	–	–	–	2R	–	2R	–	–	–	–	QF	–	35	15	70.00%
6	Steady	4	(Denmark)	Kim Astrup / Anders Skaarup Rasmussen	17	86,860	✓	RR	QF	2R	1R	–	QF	2R	–	–	2R	–	1R	–	1R	1R	–	C	–	–	2R	–	QF	–	C	–	–	C	SF	–	C	–	–	–	–	–	2R	34	13	72.34%
7	▲1	8	(China)	Liu Yuchen / Ou Xuanyi	16	82,240	✓	SF	QF	QF	SF	–	1R	QF	–	–	–	–	–	1R	1R	2R	–	–	–	2R	SF	–	QF	–	–	–	–	–	1R	–	SF	–	C	–	–	F	QF	28	15	65.12%
8	▼1	12	(Indonesia)	Muhammad Fikri / Bagas Maulana	20	80,800	✓	RR	2R	2R	QF	SF	–	QF	–	QF	2R	F	–	F	2R	1R	–	–	–	1R	2R	–	QF	–	2R	–	–	1R	F	–	F	–	–	–	–	1R	1R	33	20	62.26%
9	Steady	13	(Indonesia)	Leo Carnando / Daniel Marthin	21	79,000	✗	—N/a	2R	1R	C	C	–	QF	–	1R	1R	SF	SF	1R	QF	QF	–	–	–	1R	1R	2R	1R	–	F	–	–	–	1R	–	2R	–	–	–	–	1R	QF	30	19	61.22%
10	▲3	2	(India)	Satwiksairaj Rankireddy / Chirag Shetty	14	78,590	✗	—N/a	SF	2R	–	–	–	2R	–	C	1R	–	–	2R	1R	C	–	–	–	C	QF	–	1R	–	–	–	–	–	–	–	2R	–	–	–	–	1R	F	28	11	71.79%
11	▼1	10	(Indonesia)	Mohammad Ahsan / Hendra Setiawan	17	76,780	✗	—N/a	QF	1R	2R	–	–	F	–	–	–	–	QF	–	2R	2R	–	QF	–	–	QF	2R	1R	–	SF	–	–	SF	2R	–	QF	–	–	–	–	1R	2R	26	17	60.47%
12	Steady	9	(Chinese Taipei)	Lee Yang / Wang Chi-lin	19	76,770	✗	—N/a	2R	–	–	–	–	1R	–	–	–	–	1R	2R	1R	1R	2R	SF	–	–	C	SF	2R	–	SF	–	–	QF	2R	–	1R	–	F	–	F	1R	QF	31	18	63.27%
13	▼2	11	(Malaysia)	Ong Yew Sin / Teo Ee Yi	20	75,170	✗	—N/a	QF	QF	–	–	2R	2R	–	SF	–	–	QF	–	QF	2R	SF	–	–	2R	2R	2R	QF	–	1R	–	–	SF	QF	–	1R	–	2R	–	–	SF	1R	30	20	60.00%
14	Steady	16	(Japan)	Akira Koga / Taichi Saito	18	66,990	✗	—N/a	1R	1R	1R	–	SF	1R	–	QF	–	–	2R	–	QF	QF	–	SF	–	1R	QF	QF	2R	–	–	–	–	–	2R	–	1R	–	–	–	–	QF	2R	22	18	55.00%
15	▲1	18	(Indonesia)	Pramudya Kusumawardana / Yeremia Rambitan	21	63,550	✗	—N/a	2R	–	1R	QF	–	1R	–	1R	QF	2R	1R	2R	2R	SF	–	–	–	2R	1R	QF	2R	–	2R	–	–	QF	1R	–	1R	–	–	–	–	2R	QF	19	21	47.50%
16	▼1	17	(Chinese Taipei)	Lee Jhe-huei / Yang Po-hsuan	25	63,300	✗	—N/a	1R	2R	–	2R	SF	2R	–	2R	1R	SF	2R	1R	1R	1R	QF	2R	–	2R	1R	–	2R	–	2R	–	F	2R	QF	–	1R	–	–	–	C	1R	1R	29	23	55.77%
17	Steady	15	(China)	He Jiting / Zhou Haodong	14	59,000	✗	—N/a	1R	1R	F	1R	–	SF	–	2R	C	–	2R	2R	1R	2R	–	–	–	2R	1R	–	2R	–	–	–	–	–	–	–	–	–	–	–	–	–	–	18	13	58.06%

=== Women's doubles ===
The table below was based on the ranking of women's doubles as of 28 November 2023.

Rankings		WR	Player		TP	Points	WTF		MAS	IND	INA	THA	GER	ENG	CHN	SUI	ESP	FRA	MAS	THA	SGP	INA	TPE	CAN	USA	KOR	JPN	AUS	CHN	INA	HKG	VIE	TPE	FIN	DEN	UAE	FRA	INA	GER	MAS	KOR	JPN	CHN	Won	Lost	%
Rankings		WR	Player		TP	Points	Eli	BWTF	1000	750	500	300	300	1000	100	300	300	300	500	500	750	1000	300	500	300	500	750	500	1000	100	500	100	100	500	750	100	750	100	300	100	300	500	750	Won	Lost	%
Qualified as World Championships winner
1	▲2	1	(China)	Chen Qingchen / Jia Yifan	12	101,340	✓	DC	C	F	–	–	–	QF	–	–	–	–	–	–	C	QF	–	–	–	C	F	–	C	–	–	–	–	–	C	–	2R	–	–	–	–	1R	SF	41	5	89.13%
Qualified by World Tour Finals Ranking
2	▼1	2	(South Korea)	Baek Ha-na / Lee So-hee	14	100,860	✓	F	–	–	2R	F	C	F	–	SF	SF	–	C	SF	F	C	–	–	–	QF	QF	–	F	–	–	–	–	–	–	–	–	–	–	–	–	–	QF	46	11	80.70%
3	▼1	8	(Japan)	Mayu Matsumoto / Wakana Nagahara	16	95,320	✓	WD	–	–	–	–	QF	QF	–	–	–	–	SF	–	QF	SF	–	F	–	SF	SF	QF	QF	–	QF	–	–	SF	SF	–	SF	–	–	–	–	SF	QF	42	16	72.41%
4	▲1	4	(Japan)	Nami Matsuyama / Chiharu Shida	17	93,690	✓	SF	–	C	2R	–	F	2R	–	–	–	–	QF	–	QF	1R	–	C	–	1R	QF	2R	SF	–	2R	–	–	–	F	–	QF	–	–	–	–	1R	C	37	14	65.31%
5	▼1	10	(China)	Liu Shengshu / Tan Ning	17	89,000	✓	SF	–	–	–	–	–	–	QF	–	C	F	1R	QF	–	–	–	QF	C	–	1R	F	QF	–	1R	–	–	C	2R	–	C	–	SF	–	–	F	2R	45	13	77.59%
6	▲1	5	(Japan)	Yuki Fukushima / Sayaka Hirota	19	88,820	✗	—N/a	1R	2R	F	–	QF	2R	–	F	–	–	QF	–	2R	F	–	SF	–	2R	SF	SF	QF	–	2R	–	–	–	1R	–	QF	–	–	–	–	1R	F	37	19	66.07%
7	▲1	6	(China)	Zhang Shuxian / Zheng Yu	15	86,420	✗	—N/a	SF	QF	–	–	–	SF	–	QF	–	–	–	–	SF	QF	–	–	–	SF	1R	QF	1R	–	–	–	–	–	QF	–	1R	–	C	–	–	C	QF	32	13	71.11%
8	▼2	3	(South Korea)	Kim So-yeong / Kong Hee-yong	14	83,490	✓	RR	QF	2R	2R	–	SF	C	–	–	–	–	2R	C	QF	1R	–	–	–	F	C	C	–	–	–	–	–	–	–	–	–	–	–	–	–	1R	1R	34	9	79.07%
9	Steady	7	(Indonesia)	Apriyani Rahayu / Siti Ramadhanti	15	81,870	✓	RR	SF	–	QF	–	–	QF	–	SF	–	–	QF	2R	2R	QF	–	–	–	–	1R	2R	QF	–	C	–	–	–	–	–	SF	–	F	–	–	–	2R	31	13	70.45%
10	▲1	14	(Japan)	Rena Miyaura / Ayako Sakuramoto	19	76,650	✗	—N/a	–	–	–	2R	–	–	–	C	QF	C	2R	1R	1R	QF	–	QF	–	1R	2R	SF	SF	–	QF	–	–	1R	2R	–	2R	–	–	–	–	SF	2R	33	15	68.75%
11	▼1	9	(Thailand)	Jongkolphan Kititharakul / Rawinda Prajongjai	20	76,300	✓	RR	1R	2R	SF	2R	–	1R	–	2R	–	–	1R	SF	2R	2R	–	SF	–	–	QF	1R	1R	–	QF	–	–	F	2R	–	F	–	–	–	–	QF	1R	28	20	58.33%
12	Steady	13	(Thailand)	Benyapa Aimsaard / Nuntakarn Aimsaard	19	76,040	✗	—N/a	2R	QF	–	C	–	–	–	1R	1R	–	1R	F	2R	2R	–	QF	–	–	2R	QF	1R	–	SF	–	–	QF	QF	–	1R	–	–	–	–	QF	2R	29	19	60.42%
13	Steady	11	(South Korea)	Jeong Na-eun / Kim Hye-jeong	15	75,620	✗	—N/a	2R	SF	–	–	QF	1R	–	–	–	–	SF	QF	2R	SF	–	–	–	1R	–	–	2R	–	–	–	–	–	2R	–	QF	–	–	–	C	1R	SF	30	13	69.77%
14	Steady	15	(Japan)	Rin Iwanaga / Kie Nakanishi	20	69,180	✗	—N/a	1R	QF	1R	–	2R	1R	–	–	–	–	2R	QF	QF	2R	–	2R	–	QF	1R	QF	1R	–	2R	–	–	SF	SF	–	2R	–	–	–	–	2R	2R	24	20	54.55%
15	Steady	12	(Malaysia)	Pearly Tan / Thinaah Muralitharan	15	65,920	✗	—N/a	1R	SF	SF	–	SF	1R	–	1R	–	–	F	–	1R	–	–	–	–	2R	2R	1R	2R	–	F	–	–	–	–	–	–	–	–	–	–	QF	1R	22	15	59.46%
16	Steady	16	(China)	Li Wenmei / Liu Xuanxuan	17	65,510	✗	—N/a	QF	2R	QF	SF	1R	QF	–	2R	–	–	2R	2R	SF	1R	–	–	–	QF	1R	–	1R	–	QF	–	–	–	–	–	–	–	–	–	–	1R	2R	21	17	55.26%

=== Mixed doubles ===
The table below was based on the ranking of mixed doubles as of 28 November 2023.

Rankings		WR	Player		TP	Points	WTF		MAS	IND	INA	THA	GER	ENG	CHN	SUI	ESP	FRA	MAS	THA	SGP	INA	TPE	CAN	USA	KOR	JPN	AUS	CHN	INA	HKG	VIE	TPE	FIN	DEN	UAE	FRA	INA	GER	MAS	KOR	JPN	CHN	Won	Lost	%
Rankings		WR	Player		TP	Points	Eli	BWTF	1000	750	500	300	300	1000	100	300	300	300	500	500	750	1000	300	500	300	500	750	500	1000	100	500	100	100	500	750	100	750	100	300	100	300	500	750	Won	Lost	%
Qualified as World Championships winner
3	▲1	3	(South Korea)	Seo Seung-jae / Chae Yoo-jung	19	100,000	✓	SF	QF	QF	1R	F	2R	F	–	–	–	–	SF	1R	1R	2R	–	–	–	QF	QF	SF	C	–	–	–	–	–	SF	–	1R	–	–	–	C	SF	F	44	17	72.13%
Qualified by World Tour Finals Ranking
1	Steady	4	(China)	Feng Yanzhe / Huang Dongping	17	112,050	✓	F	–	–	C	C	C	1R	–	–	–	–	F	1R	QF	SF	–	–	–	C	SF	C	2R	–	–	–	–	C	C	–	1R	–	–	–	–	F	SF	55	10	85.25%
2	▲1	1	(China)	Zheng Siwei / Huang Yaqiong	12	104,690	✓	DC	DC	SF	–	–	–	C	–	–	–	–	–	–	QF	DC	–	–	–	QF	SF	–	QF	–	–	–	–	–	F	–	QF	–	–	–	–	C	C	43	7	86.00%
4	▼2	2	(Japan)	Yuta Watanabe / Arisa Higashino	14	98,460	✓	SF	F	C	–	–	2R	2R	–	–	–	–	–	–	F	F	–	QF	–	SF	C	–	QF	–	–	–	–	–	2R	–	SF	–	–	–	–	SF	1R	38	12	76.00%
5	Steady	5	(Thailand)	Dechapol Puavaranukroh / Sapsiree Taerattanachai	16	91,070	✓	RR	SF	2R	–	–	–	QF	–	1R	QF	–	C	F	2R	QF	–	–	–	SF	F	–	QF	–	–	–	–	QF	QF	–	2R	–	–	–	–	–	QF	36	15	70.59%
6	Steady	6	(China)	Jiang Zhenbang / Wei Yaxin	20	87,460	✗	—N/a	–	–	F	1R	–	–	C	C	QF	QF	QF	2R	1R	2R	–	–	–	F	2R	QF	1R	–	–	–	–	F	2R	–	C	–	–	–	F	QF	QF	47	17	73.44%
7	Steady	7	(South Korea)	Kim Won-ho / Jeong Na-eun	15	86,100	✓	RR	QF	SF	–	SF	F	SF	–	–	–	–	2R	C	SF	1R	–	–	–	–	–	–	2R	–	–	–	–	–	QF	–	SF	–	–	–	QF	2R	QF	35	14	71.43%
8	▲2	11	(Hong Kong)	Tang Chun Man / Tse Ying Suet	20	78,770	✓	RR	2R	2R	1R	–	2R	1R	–	–	–	–	1R	QF	1R	SF	–	–	–	2R	2R	QF	2R	–	F	–	–	2R	1R	–	F	–	C	–	–	1R	SF	29	19	60.42%
9	▼1	9	(Malaysia)	Chen Tang Jie / Toh Ee Wei	22	78,040	✓	RR	QF	2R	–	–	QF	1R	–	QF	–	C	1R	2R	SF	1R	C	–	–	1R	2R	2R	SF	–	2R	–	–	SF	2R	–	2R	–	–	–	SF	QF	1R	37	19	66.07%
10	▼1	12	(Chinese Taipei)	Ye Hong-wei / Lee Chia-hsin	23	74,610	✗	—N/a	2R	1R	2R	–	–	2R	–	SF	1R	F	1R	SF	2R	1R	SF	2R	C	–	QF	–	QF	–	1R	–	–	2R	QF	–	1R	–	SF	–	–	1R	2R	35	22	61.40%
11	Steady	13	(Japan)	Hiroki Midorikawa / Natsu Saito	21	72,430	✗	—N/a	–	1R	1R	SF	SF	1R	–	QF	–	–	1R	QF	1R	2R	–	C	–	QF	1R	F	2R	–	SF	–	–	SF	1R	–	1R	–	–	–	–	2R	1R	30	20	60.00%
12	Steady	10	(Denmark)	Mathias Christiansen / Alexandra Boje	19	70,070	✗	—N/a	1R	QF	1R	–	–	1R	–	2R	C	2R	1R	SF	C	2R	–	–	–	–	1R	–	1R	–	1R	–	–	QF	SF	–	–	–	SF	–	–	1R	1R	26	17	60.47%
13	▲1	19	(Japan)	Kyohei Yamashita / Naru Shinoya	19	64,880	✗	—N/a	1R	QF	2R	–	SF	QF	–	2R	–	–	QF	–	1R	1R	–	SF	–	1R	1R	QF	2R	–	1R	–	–	–	1R	–	2R	–	–	–	–	QF	2R	20	19	51.28%
14	▼1	8	(France)	Thom Gicquel / Delphine Delrue	13	63,870	✗	—N/a	QF	QF	SF	–	QF	2R	–	–	–	–	–	–	2R	1R	–	–	–	–	1R	–	F	–	QF	–	–	1R	QF	–	1R	–	–	–	–	–	–	19	13	59.38%
15	Steady	18	(Indonesia)	Dejan Ferdinansyah / Gloria Emanuelle Widjaja	21	63,020	✗	—N/a	SF	2R	QF	–	2R	1R	–	1R	–	–	2R	QF	1R	1R	–	–	–	2R	2R	1R	2R	–	1R	–	F	2R	2R	–	2R	–	QF	–	–	–	2R	23	21	52.27%
16	Steady	20	(Indonesia)	Rehan Naufal Kusharjanto / Lisa Ayu Kusumawati	21	61,520	✗	—N/a	2R	2R	1R	2R	–	SF	–	2R	QF	SF	2R	–	1R	2R	2R	–	–	–	1R	1R	1R	–	2R	–	–	–	1R	–	QF	–	F	–	–	1R	1R	22	21	51.16%
