= 2024 Singapore Open (badminton) =

2024 badminton tournament

Tournament details
- Dates: 28 May–2 June
- Edition: 73rd
- Level: Super 750
- Total prize money: US$850,000
- Venue: Singapore Indoor Stadium
- Location: Kallang, Singapore

Champions
- Men's singles: (China) Shi Yuqi
- Women's singles: (South Korea) An Se-young
- Men's doubles: (China) He Jiting (China) Ren Xiangyu
- Women's doubles: (China) Chen Qingchen (China) Jia Yifan
- Mixed doubles: (China) Zheng Siwei (China) Huang Yaqiong

The 2024 Singapore Open (officially known as the KFF Singapore Badminton Open 2024 for sponsorship reasons) was a badminton tournament which took place at Singapore Indoor Stadium in Singapore from 28 May to 2 June 2024 and had a total purse of $850,000.

== Tournament ==
The 2024 Singapore Open was the fourteenth tournament of the 2024 BWF World Tour and also part of the Singapore Open championships, which had been held since 1929. This tournament was organized by the Singapore Badminton Association with sanction from the BWF

=== Venue ===
This international tournament was held at Singapore Indoor Stadium in Singapore.

=== Point distribution ===
Below is the point distribution table for each phase of the tournament based on the BWF points system for the BWF World Tour Super 750 event.

Winner	Runner-up	3/4	5/8	9/16	17/32
11,000	9,350	7,700	6,050	4,320	2,660

=== Prize pool ===
The total prize money is US$850,000 with the distribution of the prize money in accordance with BWF regulations.

Event	Winner	Finalist	Semi-finals	Quarter-finals	Last 16	Last 32
Singles	$59,500	$28,900	$11,900	$4,675	$2,550	$850
Doubles	$62,900	$29,750	$11,900	$5,312.5	$2,762.5	$850

== Men's singles ==
=== Seeds ===
1. (Denmark) Viktor Axelsen (semi-finals)
2. (China) Shi Yuqi (champion)
3. (Indonesia) Jonatan Christie (first round)
4. (Denmark) Anders Antonsen (second round)
5. (Japan) Kodai Naraoka (quarter-finals)
6. (China) Li Shifeng (final)
7. (Indonesia) Anthony Sinisuka Ginting (second round)
8. (India) Prannoy H. S. (second round)

=== Finals ===
Semi-finals
1	(Denmark) Viktor Axelsen
6	(China) Li Shifeng	w	/	o
(Chinese Taipei) Chou Tien-chen	26	9
2	(China) Shi Yuqi	28	21

Final
6	(China) Li Shifeng	21	19	19
2	(China) Shi Yuqi	17	21	21

=== Top half ===
==== Section 1 ====
First round
1	(Denmark) V Axelsen	21	16	21
(India) L Sen	13	21	13
(Chinese Taipei) Lin C-y	21	22
(Hong Kong) Ng K L	13	20
7	(Indonesia) A S Ginting	w	/	o
(Malaysia) Lee Z J
(Malaysia) Leong J H	21	21
(Japan) K Tsuneyama	13	16

Second round
1	(Denmark) V Axelsen	21	14	21
(Chinese Taipei) Lin C-y	16	21	16
7	(Indonesia) A S Ginting	14	21	8
(Malaysia) Leong J H	21	10	21

Quarter-finals
1	(Denmark) V Axelsen	21	21
(Malaysia) Leong J H	12	11

==== Section 2 ====
First round
4	(Denmark) A Antonsen	21	21
(Denmark) R Gemke	17	10
(China) Lu GZ	27	15	5
(Singapore) Loh K Y	25	21	21
6	(China) Li SF	21	21
(China) Lei LX	13	15
(India) P Rajawat	21	19
(Hong Kong) Lee C Y	23	21

Second round
4	(Denmark) A Antonsen	15	21	20
(Singapore) Loh K Y	21	11	22
6	(China) Li SF	22	21
(Hong Kong) Lee C Y	20	19

Quarter-finals
(Singapore) Loh K Y	19	16
6	(China) Li SF	21	21

=== Bottom half ===
==== Section 3 ====
First round
(Japan) K Nishimoto	18	23	21
(Chinese Taipei) Su L-y	21	21	9
(Belgium) J Carraggi	9	21	9
8	(India) Prannoy H. S.	21	18	21
(Canada) B Yang	21	21
(France) C Popov	14	19
(Chinese Taipei) Chou T-c	21	21
3	(Indonesia) J Christie	17	6

Second round
(Japan) K Nishimoto	21	14	21
8	(India) Prannoy H. S.	13	21	15
(Canada) B Yang	22	9	17
(Chinese Taipei) Chou T-c	20	21	21

Quarter-finals
(Japan) K Nishimoto	17	13
(Chinese Taipei) Chou T-c	21	21

==== Section 4 ====
First round
(France) T J Popov	9	18
(Indonesia) C A Dwi Wardoyo	21	21
(India) S Kidambi	14	3^{r}
5	(Japan) K Naraoka	21	11
(Chinese Taipei) Wang T-w	19	13
(China) Weng HY	21	21
(Denmark) M Johannesen	9^{r}
2	(China) Shi YQ	17

Second round
(Indonesia) C A Dwi Wardoyo	21	9	12
5	(Japan) K Naraoka	17	21	21
(China) Weng HY	12	12
2	(China) Shi YQ	21	21

Quarter-finals
5	(Japan) K Naraoka	21	12	21
2	(China) Shi YQ	17	21	23

== Women's singles ==
=== Seeds ===
1. (South Korea) An Se-young (champion)
2. (China) Chen Yufei (final)
3. (Spain) Carolina Marín (quarter-finals)
4. (Chinese Taipei) Tai Tzu-ying (withdrew)
5. (Japan) Akane Yamaguchi (quarter-finals)
6. (China) Han Yue (second round)
7. (China) Wang Zhiyi (quarter-finals)
8. (China) He Bingjiao (second round)

=== Finals ===
Semi-finals
1	(South Korea) An Se-young	21	23
(Indonesia) Gregoria Mariska Tunjung	14	21
(Thailand) Pornpawee Chochuwong	12	17
2	(China) Chen Yufei	21	21

Final
1	(South Korea) An Se-young	21	16	21
2	(China) Chen Yufei	19	21	12

=== Top half ===
==== Section 1 ====
First round
1	(South Korea) An S-y	21	21
(Myanmar) Thet Htar T	14	10
PFR	(Canada) W Y Zhang	16	19
(Chinese Taipei) Hsu W-c	21	21
8	(China) He BJ	21	21	21
(Singapore) Yeo J M	12	23	16
(Japan) N Okuhara	21	11
(China) Zhang YM	15	8^{r}

Second round
1	(South Korea) An S-y	21	21	21
(Chinese Taipei) Hsu W-c	23	11	19
8	(China) He BJ	21	21	16
(Japan) N Okuhara	18	23	21

Quarter-finals
1	(South Korea) An S-y	21	21
(Japan) N Okuhara	12	12

==== Section 2 ====
First round
7	(China) Wang ZY	21	16	21
(Scotland) K Gilmour	16	21	19
(India) A Kashyap	19	20
(Thailand) P Choeikeewong	21	22
(Indonesia) G M Tunjung	21	21
(United States) BW Zhang	18	12
(Chinese Taipei) Pai Y-p	14	21	21
(Thailand) S Katethong	21	15	15

Second round
7	(China) Wang ZY	21	20	21
(Thailand) P Choeikeewong	18	22	15
(Indonesia) G M Tunjung	21	21
(Chinese Taipei) Pai Y-p	10	16

Quarter-finals
7	(China) Wang ZY	13	21	22
(Indonesia) G M Tunjung	21	13	24

=== Bottom half ===
==== Section 3 ====
First round
(China) Gao FJ	21	22	11
(Thailand) P Chochuwong	23	20	21
(Japan) A Ohori	17	14
6	(China) Han Y	21	21
(Denmark) L Kjærsfeldt	12	20
(India) P. V. Sindhu	21	22
(Malaysia) Goh J W	20	18
3	(Spain) C Marín	22	21

Second round
(Thailand) P Chochuwong	21	21
6	(China) Han Y	11	7
(India) P. V. Sindhu	21	11	20
3	(Spain) C Marín	13	21	22

Quarter-finals
(Thailand) P Chochuwong	21	21
3	(Spain) C Marín	19	16

==== Section 4 ====
First round
(Japan) T Miyazaki	21	21
(Vietnam) Nguyễn T L	13	15
(Thailand) R Intanon
5	(Japan) A Yamaguchi	w	/	o
(Thailand) B Ongbamrungphan	16	21	21
(Chinese Taipei) Sung S-y	21	18	12
(Canada) M Li	10	4
2	(China) Chen YF	21	21

Second round
(Japan) T Miyazaki	10	19
5	(Japan) A Yamaguchi	21	21
(Thailand) B Ongbamrungphan	15	17
2	(China) Chen YF	21	21

Quarter-finals
5	(Japan) A Yamaguchi	8	12
2	(China) Chen YF	21	21

== Men's doubles ==
=== Seeds ===
1. (India) Satwiksairaj Rankireddy / Chirag Shetty (first round)
2. (China) Liang Weikeng / Wang Chang (quarter-finals)
3. (South Korea) Kang Min-hyuk / Seo Seung-jae (quarter-finals)
4. (Malaysia) Aaron Chia / Soh Wooi Yik (quarter-finals)
5. (Denmark) Kim Astrup / Anders Skaarup Rasmussen (semi-finals)
6. (Japan) Takuro Hoki / Yugo Kobayashi (semi-finals)
7. (Indonesia) Fajar Alfian / Muhammad Rian Ardianto (final)
8. (China) Liu Yuchen / Ou Xuanyi (second round)

=== Finals ===
Semi-finals
(China) He Jiting (China) Ren Xiangyu	21	19	21
6	(Japan) Takuro Hoki (Japan) Yugo Kobayashi	16	21	16
5	(Denmark) Kim Astrup (Denmark) Anders Skaarup Rasmussen	11	21	12
7	(Indonesia) Fajar Alfian (Indonesia) Muhammad Rian Ardianto	21	16	21

Final
(China) He Jiting (China) Ren Xiangyu	21	21
7	(Indonesia) Fajar Alfian (Indonesia) Muhammad Rian Ardianto	19	14

=== Top half ===
==== Section 1 ====
First round
1	(India) S Rankireddy (India) C Shetty	20	18
(Denmark) D Lundgaard (Denmark) M Vestergaard	22	21
(Canada) A Dong (Canada) N Yakura	11	12
(China) He JT (China) Ren XY	21	21
8	(China) Liu YC (China) Ou XY	25	21
(France) C Popov (France) T J Popov	23	10
(Malaysia) Goh S F (Malaysia) N Izzuddin	21	21
(Chinese Taipei) Lu C-y (Chinese Taipei) Yang P-ha	18	13

Second round
(Denmark) D Lundgaard (Denmark) M Vestergaard	16	16
(China) He JT (China) Ren XY	21	21
8	(China) Liu YC (China) Ou XY	13	16
(Malaysia) Goh S F (Malaysia) N Izzuddin	21	21

Quarter-finals
(China) He JT (China) Ren XY	21	9	21
(Malaysia) Goh S F (Malaysia) N Izzuddin	16	21	17

==== Section 2 ====
First round
3	(South Korea) Kang M-h (South Korea) Seo S-j	8	22	21
(Indonesia) L R Carnando (Indonesia) D Marthin	21	20	14
(Indonesia) M Ahsan (Indonesia) H Setiawan	21	21	16
(Indonesia) M S Fikri (Indonesia) B Maulana	18	23	21
6	(Japan) T Hoki (Japan) Y Kobayashi	21	21
(Japan) K Mitsuhashi (Japan) H Okamura	18	17
(China) Chen BY (China) Liu Y	21	21
(Malaysia) Low H Y (Malaysia) Ng E C	16	16

Second round
3	(South Korea) Kang M-h (South Korea) Seo S-j	19	21	21
(Indonesia) M S Fikri (Indonesia) B Maulana	21	11	4
6	(Japan) T Hoki (Japan) Y Kobayashi	21	21
(China) Chen BY (China) Liu Y	18	18

Quarter-finals
3	(South Korea) Kang M-h (South Korea) Seo S-j	19	15
6	(Japan) T Hoki (Japan) Y Kobayashi	21	21

=== Bottom half ===
==== Section 3 ====
First round
(Malaysia) Man W C (Malaysia) Tee K W	21	21
(Thailand) S Jomkoh (Thailand) K Kedren	12	11
(Scotland) A Dunn (Scotland) A Hall	9	20
5	(Denmark) K Astrup (Denmark) A S Rasmussen	21	22
(Chinese Taipei) Lee Y (Chinese Taipei) Wang C-l	21	12	21
(Chinese Taipei) Lee J-h (Chinese Taipei) Yang P-hs	12	21	12
(Chinese Taipei) Chang K-c (Chinese Taipei) Po L-w	20	17
4	(Malaysia) A Chia (Malaysia) Soh W Y	22	21

Second round
(Malaysia) Man W C (Malaysia) Tee K W	10	22	19
5	(Denmark) K Astrup (Denmark) A S Rasmussen	21	20	21
(Chinese Taipei) Lee Y (Chinese Taipei) Wang C-l	18	23	17
4	(Malaysia) A Chia (Malaysia) Soh W Y	21	21	21

Quarter-finals
5	(Denmark) K Astrup (Denmark) A S Rasmussen	21	21
4	(Malaysia) A Chia (Malaysia) Soh W Y	10	14

==== Section 4 ====
First round
(Denmark) R Kjær (Denmark) F Søgaard	18	16
(Chinese Taipei) Lee F-c (Chinese Taipei) Lee F-j	21	21
(Germany) B Geiss (Germany) J C Völker	16	16
7	(Indonesia) F Alfian (Indonesia) M R Ardianto	21	21
(South Korea) Kim G-j (South Korea) Kim S-r	13	17
(Indonesia) S K Gutama (Indonesia) M R P Isfahani	21	21
(India) K P Garaga (India) K. S Pratheek	16	22
2	(China) Liang W K (China) Wang C	21	24

Second round
(Chinese Taipei) Lee F-c (Chinese Taipei) Lee F-j	8	12
7	(Indonesia) F Alfian (Indonesia) M R Ardianto	21	21
(Indonesia) S K Gutama (Indonesia) M R P Isfahani	21	11	12
2	(China) Liang W K (China) Wang C	18	21	21

Quarter-finals
7	(Indonesia) F Alfian (Indonesia) M R Ardianto	21	21
2	(China) Liang W K (China) Wang C	17	9

== Women's doubles ==
=== Seeds ===
1. (China) Chen Qingchen / Jia Yifan (champions)
2. (South Korea) Baek Ha-na / Lee So-hee (second round)
3. (China) Liu Shengshu / Tan Ning (semi-final)
4. (Japan) Nami Matsuyama / Chiharu Shida (final)
5. (China) Zhang Shuxian / Zheng Yu (first round)
6. (South Korea) Kim So-yeong / Kong Hee-yong (quarter-finals)
7. (Japan) Mayu Matsumoto / Wakana Nagahara (quarter-finals)
8. (Indonesia) Apriyani Rahayu / Siti Fadia Silva Ramadhanti (quarter-finals)

=== Finals ===
Semi-finals
1	(China) Chen Qingchen (China) Jia Yifan	21	21
3	(China) Liu Shengshu (China) Tan Ning	12	17
4	(Japan) Nami Matsuyama (Japan) Chiharu Shida	23	21
(India) Treesa Jolly (India) Gayatri Gopichand	21	11

Final
1	(China) Chen Qingchen (China) Jia Yifan	21	21
4	(Japan) Nami Matsuyama (Japan) Chiharu Shida	15	12

=== Top half ===
==== Section 1 ====
First round
1	(China) Chen QC (China) Jia YF	21	22
(Denmark) J Finne-Ipsen (Denmark) M Surrow	17	20
(France) M Lambert (France) A Tran	26	21
(Denmark) M Fruergaard (Denmark) S Thygesen	24	17
7	(Japan) M Matsumoto (Japan) W Nagahara	21	21
(Thailand) P Aiamvareesrisakul (Thailand) N Tungkasatan	7	15
(India) R Panda (India) S Panda	12	21	13
(Chinese Taipei) Chang C-h (Chinese Taipei) Yang C-t	21	12	21

Second round
1	(China) Chen QC (China) Jia YF	w	/	o
(France) M Lambert (France) A Tran
7	(Japan) M Matsumoto (Japan) W Nagahara	21	21
(Chinese Taipei) Chang C-h (Chinese Taipei) Yang C-t	14	17

Quarter-finals
1	(China) Chen QC (China) Jia YF	21	21
7	(Japan) M Matsumoto (Japan) W Nagahara	15	12

==== Section 2 ====
First round
3	(China) Liu SS (China) Tan N	21	21
(Malaysia) P Tan (Malaysia) Thinaah M	10	10
(China) Li YJ (China) Luo XM	21	22
(Chinese Taipei) Hsu Y-c (Chinese Taipei) Lin W-c	17	20
5	(China) Zhang SX (China) Zheng Y	16	21	14
(China) Li WM (China) Liu XX	21	8	21
(Bulgaria) G Stoeva (Bulgaria) S Stoeva	21	20	21
(Chinese Taipei) Hung Y-t (Chinese Taipei) Lee Y-h	15	22	15

Second round
3	(China) Liu SS (China) Tan N	25	21
(China) Li YJ (China) Luo XM	23	13
(China) Li WM (China) Liu XX	21	21
(Bulgaria) G Stoeva (Bulgaria) S Stoeva	13	16

Quarter-finals
3	(China) Liu SS (China) Tan N	21	21
(China) Li WM (China) Liu XX	19	18

=== Bottom half ===
==== Section 3 ====
First round
(India) T Crasto (India) A Ponnappa	21	19	19
(Ukraine) P Buhrova (Ukraine) Y Kantemyr	18	21	21
(India) S Singhi (India) R Thaker	12	12
8	(Indonesia) A Rahayu (Indonesia) S F S Ramadhanti	21	21
(Australia) S Mapasa (Australia) A Yu	21	21
(Canada) J Dent (Canada) C Lai	7	16
(Chinese Taipei) Hsu Y-h (Chinese Taipei) Lin J-y	16	21
4	(Japan) N Matsuyama (Japan) C Shida	21	23

Second round
(Ukraine) P Buhrova (Ukraine) Y Kantemyr
8	(Indonesia) A Rahayu (Indonesia) S F S Ramadhanti	w	/	o
(Australia) S Mapasa (Australia) A Yu	19	21	18
4	(Japan) N Matsuyama (Japan) C Shida	21	15	21

Quarter-finals
8	(Indonesia) A Rahayu (Indonesia) S F S Ramadhanti	10	21	10
4	(Japan) N Matsuyama (Japan) C Shida	21	13	21

==== Section 4 ====
First round
(Chinese Taipei) Sung S-y (Chinese Taipei) Yu C-h	13	9
(Thailand) J Kititharakul (Thailand) R Prajongjai	21	21
(Thailand) O Jongsathapornparn (Thailand) S Suwachai	14	17
6	(South Korea) Kim S-y (South Korea) Kong H-y	21	21
(India) T Jolly (India) G Gopichand	21	21
(Chinese Taipei) Cheng Y-p (Chinese Taipei) Sun Y-h	7	14
(United States) F Corbett (United States) A Lee	14	5
2	(South Korea) Baek H-n (South Korea) Lee S-h	21	21

Second round
(Thailand) J Kititharakul (Thailand) R Prajongjai	21	21
6	(South Korea) Kim S-y (South Korea) Kong H-y	23	23
(India) T Jolly (India) G Gopichand	21	14	21
2	(South Korea) Baek H-n (South Korea) Lee S-h	9	21	15

Quarter-finals
6	(South Korea) Kim S-y (South Korea) Kong H-y	21	19	22
(India) T Jolly (India) G Gopichand	18	21	24

== Mixed doubles ==
=== Seeds ===
1. (China) Zheng Siwei / Huang Yaqiong (champions)
2. (China) Feng Yanzhe / Huang Dongping (first round)
3. (Japan) Yuta Watanabe / Arisa Higashino (first round)
4. (South Korea) Seo Seung-jae / Chae Yoo-jung (semi-finals)
5. (China) Jiang Zhenbang / Wei Yaxin (quarter-finals)
6. (Thailand) Dechapol Puavaranukroh / Sapsiree Taerattanachai (first round)
7. (Hong Kong) Tang Chun Man / Tse Ying Suet (first round)
8. (South Korea) Kim Won-ho / Jeong Na-eun (first round)

=== Finals ===
Semi-finals
1	(China) Zheng Siwei (China) Huang Yaqiong	21	21
4	(South Korea) Seo Seung-jae (South Korea) Chae Yoo-jung	16	18
(Chinese Taipei) Yang Po-hsuan (Chinese Taipei) Hu Ling-fang	21	21
(Denmark) Mads Vestergaard (Denmark) Christine Busch	17	12

Final
1	(China) Zheng Siwei (China) Huang Yaqiong	21	21
(Chinese Taipei) Yang Po-hsuan (Chinese Taipei) Hu Ling-fang	11	19

=== Top half ===
==== Section 1 ====
First round
(India) B. S Reddy (India) N. S Reddy	18	19
(Malaysia) Goh S H (Malaysia) S J Lai	21	21
5	(China) Jiang ZB (China) Wei YX	21	21
(Ukraine) O Titov (Ukraine) Y Kantemyr	12	11
(Hong Kong) Lee C H (Hong Kong) Ng T Y	21	21
(India) A Surya (India) A Pramuthesh	8	17

Second round
1	(China) Zheng SW (China) Huang YQ	20	21	11
(Malaysia) Goh S H (Malaysia) S J Lai	22	11	1^{r}
5	(China) Jiang ZB (China) Wei YX	24	21
(Hong Kong) Lee C H (Hong Kong) Ng T Y	22	18

Quarter-finals
1	(China) Zheng SW (China) Huang YQ	21	22
5	(China) Jiang ZB (China) Wei YX	14	20

==== Section 2 ====
First round
4	(South Korea) Seo S-j (South Korea) Chae Y-j	21	21
(Singapore) T Hee (Singapore) J Tan	14	13
(Chinese Taipei) Chang K-c (Chinese Taipei) Lee C-c	18	21	17
(Japan) Y Kaneko (Japan) M Matsutomo	21	17	21
8	(South Korea) Kim W-h (South Korea) Jeong N-e	19	15
(Denmark) M Christiansen (Denmark) A Bøje	21	21
(Malaysia) Hoo P R (Malaysia) Cheng S Y	15	17
(Malaysia) Chen T J (Malaysia) Toh E W	21	21

Second round
4	(South Korea) Seo S-j (South Korea) Chae Y-j	21	18	21
(Japan) Y Kaneko (Japan) M Matsutomo	19	21	16
(Denmark) M Christiansen (Denmark) A Bøje	17	18
(Malaysia) Chen T J (Malaysia) Toh E W	21	21

Quarter-finals
4	(South Korea) Seo S-j (South Korea) Chae Y-j	21	21
(Malaysia) Chen T J (Malaysia) Toh E W	14	18

=== Bottom half ===
==== Section 3 ====
First round
(Chinese Taipei) Ye H-w (Chinese Taipei) Lee C-h	21	17	21
(South Korea) Ko S-h (South Korea) Eom H-w	12	21	16
(Indonesia) D Ferdinansyah (Indonesia) G E Widjaja	21	21
7	(Hong Kong) Tang C M (Hong Kong) Tse Y S	4	15
(India) S K Karunakaran (India) A Variyath	15	21	11
(China) Guo XW (China) Chen FH	21	18	21
(Chinese Taipei) Yang P-hs (Chinese Taipei) Hu L-f	13	21	21
3	(Japan) Y Watanabe (Japan) A Higashino	21	15	17

Second round
(Chinese Taipei) Ye H-w (Chinese Taipei) Lee C-h	21	21
(Indonesia) D Ferdinansyah (Indonesia) G E Widjaja	19	6
(China) Guo XW (China) Chen FH	23	22	16
(Chinese Taipei) Yang P-hs (Chinese Taipei) Hu L-f	21	24	21

Quarter-finals
(Chinese Taipei) Ye H-w (Chinese Taipei) Lee C-h	17	17
(Chinese Taipei) Yang P-hs (Chinese Taipei) Hu L-f	21	21

==== Section 4 ====
First round
(Germany) J C Völker (Germany) I Lohau	14	11
(Malaysia) Tan K M (Malaysia) Lai P J	21	21
(Netherlands) R Tabeling (Netherlands) S Piek	21	11	21
6	(Thailand) D Puavaranukroh (Thailand) S Taerattanachai	17	21	17
(Denmark) M Vestergaard (Denmark) C Busch	21	21
(India) V G Prasad (India) J Dewangan	8	8
(Thailand) S Jomkoh (Thailand) S Paewsampran	21	13	21
2	(China) Feng YZ (China) Huang DP	13	21	18

Second round
(Malaysia) Tan K M (Malaysia) Lai P J	18	21	10
(Netherlands) R Tabeling (Netherlands) S Piek	21	18	21
(Denmark) M Vestergaard (Denmark) C Busch	21	21
(Thailand) S Jomkoh (Thailand) S Paewsampran	17	13

Quarter-finals
(Netherlands) R Tabeling (Netherlands) S Piek	15	21	20
(Denmark) M Vestergaard (Denmark) C Busch	21	13	22

Preceded by 2024 Malaysia Masters	BWF World Tour; 2024 BWF season	Succeeded by 2024 Indonesia Open
