= 2024 Malaysia Masters =

Tournament details
- Dates: 21–26 May
- Level: Super 500
- Total prize money: US$420,000
- Venue: Axiata Arena
- Location: Kuala Lumpur, Malaysia

Champions
- Men's singles: (Denmark) Viktor Axelsen
- Women's singles: (China) Wang Zhiyi
- Men's doubles: (Denmark) Kim Astrup (Denmark) Anders Skaarup Rasmussen
- Women's doubles: (Japan) Rin Iwanaga (Japan) Kie Nakanishi
- Mixed doubles: (Malaysia) Goh Soon Huat (Malaysia) Shevon Jemie Lai

The 2024 Malaysia Masters (officially known as the Perodua Malaysia Masters 2024 presented by Daihatsu for sponsorship reasons) was a badminton tournament that took place at the Axiata Arena, Kuala Lumpur, Malaysia, from 21 to 26 May 2024 and had a total prize of US$420,000.

== Tournament ==
The 2024 Malaysia Masters was the thirteenth tournament of the 2024 BWF World Tour and was part of the Malaysia Masters championships, which had been held since 2009. This tournament was organised by the Badminton Association of Malaysia with sanction from the BWF.

=== Venue ===
This international tournament was held at the Axiata Arena inside the KL Sports City in Kuala Lumpur, Malaysia.

=== Point distribution ===
Below was the point distribution table for each phase of the tournament based on the BWF points system for the BWF World Tour Super 500 event.

Winner	Runner-up	3/4	5/8	9/16	17/32	33/64	65/128
9,200	7,800	6,420	5,040	3,600	2,220	880	430

=== Prize pool ===
The total prize money was US$420,000 with the distribution of the prize money in accordance with BWF regulations.

Event	Winner	Finalist	Semi-finals	Quarter-finals	Last 16
Singles	$31,500	$15,960	$6,090	$2,520	$1,470
Doubles	$33,180	$15,960	$5,880	$3,045	$1,575

== Men's singles ==
=== Seeds ===
1. (Denmark) Viktor Axelsen (champion)
2. (Denmark) Anders Antonsen (quarter-finals)
3. (China) Li Shifeng (quarter-finals)
4. (Thailand) Kunlavut Vitidsarn (withdrew)
5. (Malaysia) Lee Zii Jia (final)
6. (Singapore) Loh Kean Yew (first round)
7. (Chinese Taipei) Chou Tien-chen (quarter-finals)
8. (Hong Kong) Lee Cheuk Yiu (second round)

=== Finals ===
Semi-finals
1	(Denmark) Viktor Axelsen	21	21
(China) Lu Guangzu	6	13
(Hong Kong) Ng Ka Long	15	17
5	(Malaysia) Lee Zii Jia	21	21

Final
1	(Denmark) Viktor Axelsen	21	20	21
5	(Malaysia) Lee Zii Jia	6	22	13

=== Top half ===
==== Section 1 ====
First round
1	(Denmark) V Axelsen	21	21
(Japan) K Watanabe	14	11
(Chinese Taipei) Chi Y-j	16	21	19
Q1	(Thailand) P Teeraratsakul	21	10	21
7	(Chinese Taipei) Chou T-c	21	21
(Denmark) R Gemke	14	17
Q2	(Japan) K Takahashi	21	21
(France) C Popov	13	19

Second round
1	(Denmark) V Axelsen	21	21
Q1	(Thailand) P Teeraratsakul	18	13
7	(Chinese Taipei) Chou T-c	21	21
Q2	(Japan) K Takahashi	14	5

Quarter-finals
1	(Denmark) V Axelsen	21	21
7	(Chinese Taipei) Chou T-c	15	11

==== Section 2 ====
First round
6	(Singapore) Loh K Y	20	21	18
(Chinese Taipei) Wang T-w	22	9	21
(Chinese Taipei) Lee C-h	21	12
(China) Lu GZ	23	21
(Chinese Taipei) Lin C-y	14	20
(Indonesia) C A Dwi Wardoyo	21	22
(Belgium) J Carraggi	21	12	13
Q3	(Hong Kong) J Gunawan	19	21	21

Second round
(Chinese Taipei) Wang T-w	14	13
(China) Lu GZ	21	21
(Indonesia) C A Dwi Wardoyo	6	21	10
Q3	(Hong Kong) J Gunawan	21	16	21

Quarter-finals
(China) Lu GZ	21	15	21
Q3	(Hong Kong) J Gunawan	17	21	14

=== Bottom half ===
==== Section 3 ====
First round
(Hong Kong) Ng K L	21	21
(Thailand) K Wangcharoen	19	13
PFQ	(Brazil) Y Coelho	17	16
8	(Hong Kong) Lee C Y	21	21
(Malaysia) Leong J H	13	23	21
(China) Lei LX	21	21	12
(France) T J Popov	21	19	15
3	(China) Li SF	12	21	21

Second round
(Hong Kong) Ng K L	21	21
8	(Hong Kong) Lee C Y	19	17
(Malaysia) Leong J H	15	16
3	(China) Li SF	21	21

Quarter-finals
(Hong Kong) Ng K L	21	21
3	(China) Li SF	13	15

==== Section 4 ====
First round
(Japan) T Obayashi	16	17
(India) K George	21	21
(China) Zhao JP	21	11	14
5	(Malaysia) Lee Z J	19	21	21
(Denmark) M Johannesen	17	21	21
(Canada) B Yang	21	9	15
Q4	(Indonesia) S H Rhustavito	21	9	17
2	(Denmark) A Antonsen	12	21	21

Second round
(India) K George	13	18
5	(Malaysia) Lee Z J	21	21
(Denmark) M Johannesen	12	10
2	(Denmark) A Antonsen	21	21

Quarter-finals
5	(Malaysia) Lee Z J	21	19	21
2	(Denmark) A Antonsen	15	21	11

== Women's singles ==
=== Seeds ===
1. (China) Han Yue (quarter-finals)
2. (China) Wang Zhiyi (champion)
3. (United States) Beiwen Zhang (second round)
4. (Thailand) Ratchanok Intanon (second round)
5. (India) Pusarla V. Sindhu (final)
6. (China) Zhang Yiman (semi-finals)
7. (Singapore) Yeo Jia Min (withdrew)
8. (Thailand) Pornpawee Chochuwong (second round)

=== Finals ===
Semi-finals
5	(India) P. V. Sindhu	13	21	21
(Thailand) Busanan Ongbamrungphan	21	16	12
6	(China) Zhang Yiman	9	11
2	(China) Wang Zhiyi	21	21

Final
5	(India) P. V. Sindhu	21	5	16
2	(China) Wang Zhiyi	16	21	21

=== Top half ===
==== Section 1 ====
First round
1	(China) Han Y	21	21
PFQ	(Malaysia) Letshanaa K	14	9
(Belgium) L Tan	11	13
Q3	(Chinese Taipei) Hung Y-t	21	21
5	(India) P. V. Sindhu	21	21
(Scotland) K Gilmour	17	16
(Indonesia) K A C Dewi	21	11	6
(South Korea) Sim Y-j	16	21	21

Second round
1	(China) Han Y	21	21
Q3	(Chinese Taipei) Hung Y-t	16	11
5	(India) P. V. Sindhu	21	12	21
(South Korea) Sim Y-j	13	21	14

Quarter-finals
1	(China) Han Y	13	21	12
5	(India) P. V. Sindhu	21	14	21

==== Section 2 ====
First round
4	(Thailand) R Intanon	21	21
(Myanmar) T H Thuzar	13	14
PFQ	(Chinese Taipei) Lin H-t	9	19
(Indonesia) P K Wardani	21	21
(Thailand) B Ongbambrungphan	21	14	21
(Denmark) L Kjærsfeldt	12	21	16
Q2	(Ukraine) P Buhrova	16	21	14
(Malaysia) Goh J W	21	18	21

Second round
4	(Thailand) R Intanon	19	19
(Indonesia) P K Wardani	21	21
(Thailand) B Ongbambrungphan	21	21
(Malaysia) Goh J W	10	14

Quarter-finals
(Indonesia) P K Wardani	12	23	16
(Thailand) B Ongbambrungphan	21	21	21

=== Bottom half ===
==== Section 3 ====
First round
(Vietnam) Nguyễn T L	10	13
(Chinese Taipei) Liang T-y	21	21
(Chinese Taipei) Chiu P-c	19	10
6	(China) Zhang YM	21	21
(India) A Chaliha	21	21
Q1	(Chinese Taipei) Lin S-y	17	16
Q4	(Chinese Taipei) Chen S-y	18	12
3	(United States) BW Zhang	21	21

Second round
(Chinese Taipei) Liang T-y	15	16
6	(China) Zhang YM	21	21
(India) A Chaliha	21	16	21
3	(United States) BW Zhang	19	21	12

Quarter-finals
6	(China) Zhang YM	21	21
(India) A Chaliha	10	15

==== Section 4 ====
First round
PFQ	(India) U Hooda	13	18
(China) Gao FJ	21	21
PFQ	(Chinese Taipei) Huang Y-s	18	16
8	(Thailand) P Chochuwong	21	21
(Chinese Taipei) Sung S-y	12	15
(Indonesia) E N T Wardoyo	21	21
(India) A Kashyap	22	13
2	(China) Wang ZY	24	21

Second round
(China) Gao FJ	21	22
8	(Thailand) P Chochuwong	19	20
(Indonesia) E N T Wardoyo	10	11
2	(China) Wang ZY	21	21

Quarter-finals
(China) Gao FJ	21	17
2	(China) Wang ZY	23	21

== Men's doubles ==
=== Seeds ===
1. (Malaysia) Aaron Chia / Soh Wooi Yik (quarter-finals)
2. (Denmark) Kim Astrup / Anders Skaarup Rasmussen (champions)
3. (China) He Jiting / Ren Xiangyu (semi-finals)
4. (Chinese Taipei) Lee Jhe-huei / Yang Po-hsuan (second round)
5. (Malaysia) Goh Sze Fei / Nur Izzudin (quarter-finals)
6. (Denmark) Rasmus Kjær / Frederik Søgaard (quarter-finals)
7. (Malaysia) Man Wei Chong / Tee Kai Wun (quarter-finals)
8. (Chinese Taipei) Lu Ching-yao / Yang Po-han (second round)

=== Finals ===
Semi-finals
(South Korea) Jin Yong (South Korea) Na Sung-seung	21	21
3	(China) He Jiting (China) Ren Xiangyu	19	13
(Malaysia) Junaidi Arif (Malaysia) Yap Roy King	13	19
2	(Denmark) Kim Astrup (Denmark) Anders Skaarup Rasmussen	21	21

Final
(South Korea) Jin Yong (South Korea) Na Sung-seung	18	14
2	(Denmark) Kim Astrup (Denmark) Anders Skaarup Rasmussen	21	21

=== Top half ===
==== Section 1 ====
First round
1	(Malaysia) A Chia (Malaysia) Soh W Y	21	22
Q1	(South Korea) Kim Y-h (South Korea) Wang C	18	20
(China) Chen BY (China) Liu Y	21	21
(Germany) B Geiss (Germany) J C Voelker	14	10
8	(Chinese Taipei) Lu C-y (Chinese Taipei) Yang P-ha	21	21
(Scotland) C Grimley (Scotland) M Grimley	16	9
(South Korea) Jin Y (South Korea) Na S-s	21	25
(Denmark) D Lundgaard (Denmark) M Vestergaard	16	23

Second round
1	(Malaysia) A Chia (Malaysia) Soh W Y	21	13	21
(China) Chen BY (China) Liu Y	13	21	10
8	(Chinese Taipei) Lu C-y (Chinese Taipei) Yang P-ha	11	8
(South Korea) Jin Y (South Korea) Na S-s	21	21

Quarter-finals
1	(Malaysia) A Chia (Malaysia) Soh W Y	21	19	19
(South Korea) Jin Y (South Korea) Na S-s	11	21	21

==== Section 2 ====
First round
3	(China) He JT (China) Ren XY	21	23
(Chinese Taipei) Chang K-c (Chinese Taipei) Po L-w	12	21
(India) K P Garaga (India) K S Pratheek	23	21
Q4	(Chinese Taipei) Lu M-c (Chinese Taipei) Tang K-w	21	11
7	(Malaysia) Man W C (Malaysia) Tee K W	22	21
(Chinese Taipei) Chiang C-w (Chinese Taipei) Wu H-y	20	10
(Malaysia) N M Azriyn A (Malaysia) Tan W K	20	19
(Malaysia) Choong H J (Malaysia) M Haikal	22	21

Second round
3	(China) He JT (China) Ren XY	21	21
(India) K P Garaga (India) K S Pratheek	11	9
7	(Malaysia) Man W C (Malaysia) Tee K W	21	21
(Malaysia) Choong H J (Malaysia) M Haikal	15	19

Quarter-finals
3	(China) He JT (China) Ren XY	21	21
7	(Malaysia) Man W C (Malaysia) Tee K W	18	16

=== Bottom half ===
==== Section 3 ====
First round
(South Korea) Kim G-j (South Korea) Kim S-r	21	21
(Chinese Taipei) Lin B-w (Chinese Taipei) Su C-h	7	16
Q3	(Malaysia) Boon X Y (Malaysia) Goh V S	13	8
6	(Denmark) R Kjær (Denmark) F Søgaard	21	21
(China) Xie HN (China) Zeng WH	16	12
(Malaysia) J Arif (Malaysia) Yap R K	21	21
(France) C Popov (France) T J Popov	15	15
4	(Chinese Taipei) Lee J-h (Chinese Taipei) Yang P-hs	21	21

Second round
(South Korea) Kim G-j (South Korea) Kim S-r	16	18
6	(Denmark) R Kjær (Denmark) F Søgaard	21	21
(Malaysia) J Arif (Malaysia) Yap R K	13	21	21
4	(Chinese Taipei) Lee J-h (Chinese Taipei) Yang P-hs	21	15	18

Quarter-finals
6	(Denmark) R Kjær (Denmark) F Søgaard	18	21	18
(Malaysia) J Arif (Malaysia) Yap R K	21	14	21

==== Section 4 ====
First round
(Thailand) P Sukphun (Thailand) P Teeraratsakul	21	21
Q2	(Hong Kong) Law C H (Hong Kong) Yeung S C	11	16
(Malaysia) Low H Y (Malaysia) Ng E C	11	19
5	(Malaysia) Goh S F (Malaysia) N Izzudin	21	21
(Chinese Taipei) Wei C-w (Chinese Taipei) Wu G-x	21	21
(Scotland) A Dunn (Scotland) A Hall	19	15
(Indonesia) S K Gutama (Indonesia) M R P Isfahani	11	13
2	(Denmark) K Astrup (Denmark) A S Rasmussen	21	21

Second round
(Thailand) P Sukphun (Thailand) P Teeraratsakul	17	12
5	(Malaysia) Goh S F (Malaysia) N Izzudin	21	21
(Chinese Taipei) Wei C-w (Chinese Taipei) Wu G-x	11	16
2	(Denmark) K Astrup (Denmark) A S Rasmussen	21	21

Quarter-finals
5	(Malaysia) Goh S F (Malaysia) N Izzudin	19	17
2	(Denmark) K Astrup (Denmark) A S Rasmussen	21	21

== Women's doubles ==
=== Seeds ===
1. (Japan) Rin Iwanaga / Kie Nakanishi (champions)
2. (Malaysia) Pearly Tan / Thinaah Muralitharan (semi-finals)
3. (Indonesia) Febriana Dwipuji Kusuma / Amalia Cahaya Pratiwi (second round)
4. (Bulgaria) Gabriela Stoeva / Stefani Stoeva (semi-finals)
5. (China) Li Yijing / Luo Xumin (quarter-finals)
6. (South Korea) Lee Yu-lim / Shin Seung-chan (final)
7. (India) Treesa Jolly / Gayatri Gopichand (second round)
8. (Australia) Setyana Mapasa / Angela Yu (quarter-finals)

=== Finals ===
Semi-finals
1	(Japan) Rin Iwanaga (Japan) Kie Nakanishi	21	21
4	(Bulgaria) Gabriela Stoeva (Bulgaria) Stefani Stoeva	14	16
6	(South Korea) Lee Yu-lim (South Korea) Shin Seung-chan	21	21
2	(Malaysia) Pearly Tan (Malaysia) Thinaah Muralitharan	16	11

Final
1	(Japan) Rin Iwanaga (Japan) Kie Nakanishi	17	21	21
6	(South Korea) Lee Yu-lim (South Korea) Shin Seung-chan	21	19	18

=== Top half ===
==== Section 1 ====
First round
(Chinese Taipei) Hsu Y-h (Chinese Taipei) Lin J-y	21	21
(India) P Arora (India) U Hooda	10	5
7	(India) T Jolly (India) G Gopichand	21	21
(Chinese Taipei) Huang Y-h (Chinese Taipei) Liang T-y	14	10
(Chinese Taipei) Sung S-y (Chinese Taipei) Yu C-h	21	21
(India) R Panda (India) S Panda	10	7

Second round
1	(Japan) R Iwanaga (Japan) K Nakanishi	21	21
(Chinese Taipei) Hsu Y-h (Chinese Taipei) Lin J-y	7	12
7	(India) T Jolly (India) G Gopichand	18	22	14
(Chinese Taipei) Sung S-y (Chinese Taipei) Yu C-h	21	20	21

Quarter-finals
1	(Japan) R Iwanaga (Japan) K Nakanishi	21	21
(Chinese Taipei) Sung S-y (Chinese Taipei) Yu C-h	16	15

==== Section 2 ====
First round
4	(Bulgaria) G Stoeva (Bulgaria) S Stoeva	21	21
(Hong Kong) Fan K Y (Hong Kong) Yau M Y	10	15
(United States) F Corbett (United States) A Lee	21	21
(Thailand) P Pattanawaritthipan (Thailand) A Povanon	14	6
5	(China) Li YJ (China) Luo XM	21	21
(Chinese Taipei) Cheng Y-p (Chinese Taipei) Sun Y-h	10	18
(Chinese Taipei) Chang C-h (Chinese Taipei) Yang C-t	21	21
(Thailand) O Jongsathapornparn (Thailand) S Suwachai	11	9

Second round
4	(Bulgaria) G Stoeva (Bulgaria) S Stoeva	21	21	21
(United States) F Corbett (United States) A Lee	23	9	10
5	(China) Li YJ (China) Luo XM	21	21
(Chinese Taipei) Chang C-h (Chinese Taipei) Yang C-t	16	13

Quarter-finals
4	(Bulgaria) G Stoeva (Bulgaria) S Stoeva	21	21	21
5	(China) Li YJ (China) Luo XM	23	18	19

=== Bottom half ===
==== Section 3 ====
First round
(Chinese Taipei) Hu L-f (Chinese Taipei) Lin X-m	16	21	24
(Thailand) L Kanlaha (Thailand) P Muenwong	21	12	26
(Hong Kong) Lui L L (Hong Kong) Tsang H Y	17	13
6	(South Korea) Lee Y-l (South Korea) Shin S-c	21	21
(Chinese Taipei) Hung Y-t (Chinese Taipei) Lee Y-h	14	15
(China) Keng SL (China) Zhang C	21	21
(Malaysia) V Hoo (Malaysia) Lim C S	14	11
3	(Indonesia) F D Kusuma (Indonesia) A C Pratiwi	21	21

Second round
(Thailand) L Kanlaha (Thailand) P Muenwong	17	14
6	(South Korea) Lee Y-l (South Korea) Shin S-c	21	21
(China) Keng SL (China) Zhang C	21	21
3	(Indonesia) F D Kusuma (Indonesia) A C Pratiwi	16	17

Quarter-finals
6	(South Korea) Lee Y-l (South Korea) Shin S-c	21	21
(China) Keng SL (China) Zhang C	17	14

==== Section 4 ====
First round
(Ukraine) P Buhrova (Ukraine) Y Kantemyr	15	15
(Malaysia) Go P K (Malaysia) Low Y Y	21	21
(Chinese Taipei) N G Chan (Chinese Taipei) Yang C-y	20	9
8	(Australia) S Mapasa (Australia) A Yu	22	21
(Thailand) P Aiamvareesrisakul (Thailand) N Tungkasatan	14	13
(India) S Singhi (India) R Thaker	21	21
(Thailand) P Phatcharaphisutsin (Thailand) N Sukklad
2	(Malaysia) P Tan (Malaysia) Thinaah M	w	/	o

Second round
(Malaysia) Go P K (Malaysia) Low Y Y	8	11
8	(Australia) S Mapasa (Australia) A Yu	21	21
(India) S Singhi (India) R Thaker	17	11
2	(Malaysia) P Tan (Malaysia) Thinaah M	21	21

Quarter-finals
8	(Australia) S Mapasa (Australia) A Yu	16	8
2	(Malaysia) P Tan (Malaysia) Thinaah M	21	21

== Mixed doubles ==
=== Seeds ===
1. (Malaysia) Chen Tang Jie / Toh Ee Wei (semi-finals)
2. (Denmark) Mathias Christiansen / Alexandra Bøje (semi-finals)
3. (Indonesia) Rinov Rivaldy / Pitha Haningtyas Mentari (final)
4. (Malaysia) Goh Soon Huat / Lai Shevon Jemie (champions)
5. (China) Guo Xinwa / Chen Fanghui (quarter-finals)
6. (Indonesia) Dejan Ferdinansyah / Gloria Emanuelle Widjaja (quarter-finals)
7. (Indonesia) Rehan Naufal Kusharjanto / Lisa Ayu Kusumawati (quarter-finals)
8. (Malaysia) Tan Kian Meng / Lai Pei Jing (quarter-finals)

=== Finals ===
Semi-finals
1	(Malaysia) Chen Tang Jie (Malaysia) Toh Ee Wei	11	19
4	(Malaysia) Goh Soon Huat (Malaysia) Shevon Jemie Lai	21	21
3	(Indonesia) Rinov Rivaldy (Indonesia) Pitha Haningtyas Mentari	26	14	21
2	(Denmark) Mathias Christiansen (Denmark) Alexandra Bøje	24	21	18

Final
4	(Malaysia) Goh Soon Huat (Malaysia) Shevon Jemie Lai	21	21
3	(Indonesia) Rinov Rivaldy (Indonesia) Pitha Haningtyas Mentari	18	19

=== Top half ===
==== Section 1 ====
First round
1	(Malaysia) Chen T J (Malaysia) Toh E W	21	21
(Thailand) P Teeraratsakul (Thailand) P Muenwong	12	14
(India) B S Reddy (India) N S Reddy	21	12	21
Q2	(Hong Kong) Lui C W (Hong Kong) Fu C Y	15	21	17
8	(Malaysia) Tan K M (Malaysia) Lai P J	21	17	21
(Thailand) R Oupthong (Thailand) J Sudjaipraparat	16	21	19
(Malaysia) Choong H J (Malaysia) Go P K	19	16
(South Korea) Wang C (South Korea) Shin S-c	21	21

Second round
1	(Malaysia) Chen T J (Malaysia) Toh E W	21	21
(India) B S Reddy (India) N S Reddy	9	15
8	(Malaysia) Tan K M (Malaysia) Lai P J	15	21	21
(South Korea) Wang C (South Korea) Shin S-c	21	19	19

Quarter-finals
1	(Malaysia) Chen T J (Malaysia) Toh E W	21	21
8	(Malaysia) Tan K M (Malaysia) Lai P J	19	14

==== Section 2 ====
First round
4	(Malaysia) Goh S H (Malaysia) S J Lai	21	21
(South Korea) Ko S-h (South Korea) Eom H-w	19	17
(Chinese Taipei) Wu H-y (Chinese Taipei) Yang C-y	21	15	18
(Chinese Taipei) Yang P-hs (Chinese Taipei) Hu L-f	17	21	21
7	(Indonesia) R N Kusharjanto (Indonesia) L A Kusumawati	21	19	21
(Indonesia) A Maulana (Indonesia) N V Marwah	18	21	15
(Denmark) M Vestergaard (Denmark) C Busch	21	15	21
(Chinese Taipei) Lin B-w (Chinese Taipei) Lin C-c	11	21	18

Second round
4	(Malaysia) Goh S H (Malaysia) S J Lai	17	21	21
(Chinese Taipei) Yang P-hs (Chinese Taipei) Hu L-f	21	19	13
7	(Indonesia) R N Kusharjanto (Indonesia) L A Kusumawati	21	21
(Denmark) M Vestergaard (Denmark) C Busch	17	16

Quarter-finals
4	(Malaysia) Goh S H (Malaysia) S J Lai	12	21	21
7	(Indonesia) R N Kusharjanto (Indonesia) L A Kusumawati	21	17	17

=== Bottom half ===
==== Section 3 ====
First round
(China) Cheng X (China) Li Q	21	21
(Malaysia) Chan P S (Malaysia) Cheah Y S	10	6
(India) S K Karunakaran (India) A Variyath	16	13
6	(Indonesia) D Ferdinansyah (Indonesia) G E Widjaja	21	21
Q1	(South Korea) Kim Y-h (South Korea) Lee Y-l	16	20
(Germany) J C Voelker (Germany) I Lohau	21	22
(Malaysia) Yap R K (Malaysia) V Siow	14	12
3	(Indonesia) R Rivaldy (Indonesia) P H Mentari	21	21

Second round
(China) Cheng X (China) Li Q	21	18	17
6	(Indonesia) D Ferdinansyah (Indonesia) G E Widjaja	14	21	21
(Germany) J C Voelker (Germany) I Lohau	21	11	10
3	(Indonesia) R Rivaldy (Indonesia) P H Mentari	16	21	21

Quarter-finals
6	(Indonesia) D Ferdinansyah (Indonesia) G E Widjaja	9	21	8
3	(Indonesia) R Rivaldy (Indonesia) P H Mentari	21	18	21

==== Section 4 ====
First round
(Chinese Taipei) Chang K-c (Chinese Taipei) Lee C-c	13	17
Q4	(Chinese Taipei) Wei C-w (Chinese Taipei) N G Chan	21	21
(Indonesia) J Hidayatullah (Indonesia) A S P Pranata	16	15
5	(China) Guo XW (China) Chen FH	21	21
Q3	(Hong Kong) Hung K C (Hong Kong) Tsang H Y	16	23
(Malaysia) Hoo P R (Malaysia) Cheng S Y	21	25
(China) Zhou ZH (China) Yang JY	21	17	15
2	(Denmark) M Christiansen (Denmark) A Bøje	18	21	21

Second round
Q4	(Chinese Taipei) Wei C-w (Chinese Taipei) N G Chan	14	17
5	(China) Guo XW (China) Chen FH	21	21
(Malaysia) Hoo P R (Malaysia) Cheng S Y	10	15
2	(Denmark) M Christiansen (Denmark) A Bøje	21	21

Quarter-finals
5	(China) Guo XW (China) Chen FH	15	18
2	(Denmark) M Christiansen (Denmark) A Bøje	21	21

Preceded by 2024 Thailand Open	BWF World Tour; 2024 BWF season	Succeeded by 2024 Singapore Open
