= 2022 Thailand Open (badminton) =

2022 badminton tournament in Thailand

Tournament details
- Dates: 17–22 May
- Edition: 34th
- Level: Super 500
- Total prize money: US$360,000
- Venue: Impact Arena
- Location: Pak Kret, Thailand

Champions
- Men's singles: (Malaysia) Lee Zii Jia
- Women's singles: (Chinese Taipei) Tai Tzu-ying
- Men's doubles: (Japan) Takuro Hoki (Japan) Yugo Kobayashi
- Women's doubles: (Japan) Nami Matsuyama (Japan) Chiharu Shida
- Mixed doubles: (China) Zheng Siwei (China) Huang Yaqiong

The 2022 Thailand Open was a badminton tournament that took place at Impact Arena in Pak Kret, Thailand, from 17 to 22 May 2022. The tournament had a total prize pool of $360,000.

== Tournament ==
The 2022 Thailand Open was the ninth tournament of the 2022 BWF World Tour and was part of the Thailand Open championships, which had been held since 1984. This tournament was organized by the Badminton Association of Thailand with sanction from the BWF.

=== Venue ===
This international tournament was held at the Impact Arena in Pak Kret, Nonthaburi, Thailand.

=== Point distribution ===
Below is the point distribution table for each phase of the tournament based on the BWF points system for the BWF World Tour Super 500 event.

Winner	Runner-up	3/4	5/8	9/16	17/32	33/64	65/128
9,200	7,800	6,420	5,040	3,600	2,220	880	430

=== Prize pool ===
The total prize money was US$360,000 with the distribution of the prize money in accordance with BWF regulations.

Event	Winner	Finalist	Semi-finals	Quarter-finals	Last 16
Singles	$27,000	$13,680	$5,220	$2,160	$1,260
Doubles	$28,440	$13,680	$5,040	$2,610	$1,350

== Men's singles ==
=== Seeds ===
1. (Denmark) Viktor Axelsen (second round)
2. (Japan) Kento Momota (first round)
3. (Denmark) Anders Antonsen (first round)
4. (Chinese Taipei) Chou Tien-chen (first round)
5. (Indonesia) Anthony Sinisuka Ginting (withdrew)
6. (Malaysia) Lee Zii Jia (champion)
7. (Indonesia) Jonatan Christie (withdrew)
8. (India) Srikanth Kidambi (second round)

=== Finals ===
Semi-finals
PFQ	(Japan) Kodai Naraoka	19	21	19
Q2	(China) Li Shifeng	21	16	21
6	(Malaysia) Lee Zii Jia	21	13	21
(Malaysia) Liew Daren	16	21	14

Final
Q2	(China) Li Shifeng	21	11	21
6	(Malaysia) Lee Zii Jia	17	21	23

=== Top half ===
==== Section 1 ====
First round
1	(Denmark) V Axelsen	21	21
(South Korea) Heo K-h	19	13
PFQ	(Japan) K Naraoka	21	22
(Denmark) R Gemke	18	20
8	(India) S Kidambi	18	21	21
PFQ	(France) B Leverdez	21	10	16
(Denmark) H-K Vittinghus	12	21
PFQ	(Republic of Ireland) N Nguyen	21	23

Second round
1	(Denmark) V Axelsen
PFQ	(Japan) K Naraoka	w	/	o
8	(India) S Kidambi
PFQ	(Republic of Ireland) N Nguyen	w	/	o

Quarter-finals
PFQ	(Japan) K Naraoka	21	21
PFQ	(Republic of Ireland) N Nguyen	10	18

==== Section 2 ====
First round
4	(Chinese Taipei) Chou T-c	20	21	15
(Indonesia) T Sugiarto	22	14	21
(Japan) K Nishimoto	12	17
Q2	(China) Li SF	21	21
PFQ	(Malaysia) Ng T Y	12	21	19
(Chinese Taipei) Wang T-w	21	13	21
(India) So Verma	20	12
(France) T J Popov	22	21

Second round
(Indonesia) T Sugiarto	20	21	18
Q2	(China) Li SF	22	13	21
(Chinese Taipei) Wang T-w	13	21	21
(France) T J Popov	21	15	18

Quarter-finals
Q2	(China) Li SF	21	21
(Chinese Taipei) Wang T-w	16	17

=== Bottom half ===
==== Section 3 ====
First round
PFQ	(France) T Rouxel	11	13
Q3	(Germany) K Schäfer	21	21
Q1	(Azerbaijan) A R Dwicahyo	19	9
6	(Malaysia) Lee Z J	21	21
(China) Lu GZ	19	21	15
(Canada) B Yang	21	11	21
(Indonesia) S H Rhustavito	17	21	21
3	(Denmark) A Antonsen	21	19	16

Second round
Q3	(Germany) K Schäfer	7	11
6	(Malaysia) Lee Z J	21	21
(Canada) B Yang	21	8	7
(Indonesia) S H Rhustavito	18	21	21

Quarter-finals
6	(Malaysia) Lee Z J	21	14	21
(Indonesia) S H Rhustavito	10	21	16

==== Section 4 ====
First round
(Malaysia) Liew D	21	15	21
(India) Prannoy H. S.	17	21	15
Q4	(Denmark) M Christophersen	16	15
PFQ	(Japan) K Watanabe	21	21
(India) B. Sai Praneeth	12	13
(Thailand) K Wangcharoen	21	21
(China) Zhao JP	21	21
2	(Japan) K Momota	8	11

Second round
(Malaysia) Liew D	16	22	21
PFQ	(Japan) K Watanabe	21	20	11
(Thailand) K Wangcharoen	19	18
(China) Zhao JP	21	21

Quarter-finals
(Malaysia) Liew D	21	19	21
(China) Zhao JP	10	21	19

== Women's singles ==
=== Seeds ===
1. (Chinese Taipei) Tai Tzu-ying (champion)
2. (Japan) Akane Yamaguchi (quarter-finals)
3. (China) Chen Yufei (final)
4. (South Korea) An Se-young (first round)
5. (Japan) Nozomi Okuhara (second round)
6. (India) P. V. Sindhu (semi-finals)
7. (Thailand) Ratchanok Intanon (semi-finals)
8. (China) He Bingjiao (quarter-finals)

=== Finals ===
Semi-finals
1	(Chinese Taipei) Tai Tzu-ying	10	21	21
7	(Thailand) Ratchanok Intanon	21	13	19
3	(China) Chen Yufei	21	21
6	(India) P. V. Sindhu	17	16

Final
1	(Chinese Taipei) Tai Tzu-ying	21	17	21
3	(China) Chen Yufei	15	21	12

=== Top half ===
==== Section 1 ====
First round
1	(Chinese Taipei) Tai T-y	18	21	21
(Denmark) J D Jakobsen	21	9	5
(Malaysia) Kisona S	21	18	19
(Indonesia) R Hartawan	14	21	21
8	(China) He BJ	21	21
(China) Han Y	18	9
(Indonesia) Fitriani	21	23
(France) L Huet	11	21

Second round
1	(Chinese Taipei) Tai T-y	21	21
(Indonesia) R Hartawan	15	14
8	(China) He BJ	21	21
(Indonesia) Fitriani	12	6

Quarter-finals
1	(Chinese Taipei) Tai T-y	21	14	21
8	(China) He BJ	10	21	18

==== Section 2 ====
First round
4	(South Korea) An S-y	16	21	18
(Denmark) L Christophersen	21	11	21
Q4	(India) M Bansod	17	21	21
(Ukraine) M Ulitina	21	15	11
7	(Thailand) R Intanon	21	21
Q1	(India) A Chaliha	10	15
(Germany) Y Li	15	12
(China) Wang ZY	21	21

Second round
(Denmark) L Christophersen	16	21	21
Q4	(India) M Bansod	21	14	14
7	(Thailand) R Intanon	21	21
(China) Wang ZY	13	15

Quarter-finals
(Denmark) L Christophersen	8	8
7	(Thailand) R Intanon	21	21

=== Bottom half ===
==== Section 3 ====
First round
(India) A Kashyap	13	18
(Canada) M Li	21	21
Q3	(Chinese Taipei) Hsu W-c	21	10	19
5	(Japan) N Okuhara	19	21	21
(China) Zhang YM	21	17	21
(Denmark) L Kjærsfeldt	11	21	19
(Denmark) M Blichfeldt	16	10
3	(China) Chen YF	21	21

Second round
(Canada) M Li	21	13	21
5	(Japan) N Okuhara	10	21	4
(China) Zhang YM	21	14	13
3	(China) Chen YF	19	21	21

Quarter-finals
(Canada) M Li	14	22	17
3	(China) Chen YF	21	20	21

==== Section 4 ====
First round
(Japan) S Takahashi	15	21	16
(South Korea) Sim Y-j	21	17	21
Q2	(United States) L Lam	19	21	18
6	(India) P. V. Sindhu	21	19	21
(India) S Nehwal	21	15	17
(South Korea) Kim G-e	11	21	21
(Thailand) B Ongbamrungphan	15	14
2	(Japan) A Yamaguchi	21	21

Second round
(South Korea) Sim Y-j	16	13
6	(India) P. V. Sindhu	21	21
(South Korea) Kim G-e	23	15	16
2	(Japan) A Yamaguchi	21	21	21

Quarter-finals
6	(India) P. V. Sindhu	21	20	21
2	(Japan) A Yamaguchi	15	22	13

== Men's doubles ==
=== Seeds ===
1. (Indonesia) Mohammad Ahsan / Hendra Setiawan (quarter-finals)
2. (Chinese Taipei) Lee Yang / Wang Chi-lin (quarter-finals)
3. (Japan) Takuro Hoki / Yugo Kobayashi (champions)
4. (India) Satwiksairaj Rankireddy / Chirag Shetty (withdrew)
5. (Indonesia) Fajar Alfian / Muhammad Rian Ardianto (final)
6. (Malaysia) Aaron Chia / Soh Wooi Yik (semi-finals)
7. (Denmark) Kim Astrup / Anders Skaarup Rasmussen (semi-finals)
8. (Malaysia) Ong Yew Sin / Teo Ee Yi (withdrew)

=== Finals ===
Semi-finals
7	(Denmark) Kim Astrup (Denmark) Anders Skaarup Rasmussen	23	18	18
3	(Japan) Takuro Hoki (Japan) Yugo Kobayashi	21	21	21
5	(Indonesia) Fajar Alfian (Indonesia) Muhammad Rian Ardianto	21	21
6	(Malaysia) Aaron Chia (Malaysia) Soh Wooi Yik	19	14

Final
3	(Japan) Takuro Hoki (Japan) Yugo Kobayashi	13
5	(Indonesia) Fajar Alfian (Indonesia) Muhammad Rian Ardianto	4^{r}

=== Top half ===
==== Section 1 ====
First round
1	(Indonesia) M Ahsan (Indonesia) H Setiawan	21	21
(England) C Hemming (England) S Stallwood	19	19
(Thailand) S Jomkoh (Thailand) K Kedren	13	21	12
(Indonesia) M S Fikri (Indonesia) B Maulana	21	14	21
7	(Denmark) K Astrup (Denmark) A S Rasmussen	21	21
(Malaysia) Tan K M (Malaysia) Tan W K	8	16
(England) B Lane (England) S Vendy	21	18	12
(Chinese Taipei) Lu C-y (Chinese Taipei) Yang P-ha	17	21	21

Second round
1	(Indonesia) M Ahsan (Indonesia) H Setiawan	21	18	21
(Indonesia) M S Fikri (Indonesia) B Maulana	18	21	16
7	(Denmark) K Astrup (Denmark) A S Rasmussen	21	21
(Chinese Taipei) Lu C-y (Chinese Taipei) Yang P-ha	11	6

Quarter-finals
1	(Indonesia) M Ahsan (Indonesia) H Setiawan	13	15
7	(Denmark) K Astrup (Denmark) A S Rasmussen	21	21

==== Section 2 ====
First round
3	(Japan) T Hoki (Japan) Y Kobayashi	18	21	21
(Malaysia) Goh V S (Malaysia) Low J S	21	12	11
Q3	(China) Liang WK (China) Wang C	23	21
(India) K P Garaga (India) V G Panjala	21	11
PFQ	(India) S Prasad (India) S. Sunjith Jr.	7	15
(Malaysia) Goh S F (Malaysia) N Izzuddin	21	21
(France) F Delrue (France) W Villeger	22	24
(France) C Popov (France) T J Popov	24	26

Second round
3	(Japan) T Hoki (Japan) Y Kobayashi	21	19	21
Q3	(China) Liang WK (China) Wang C	13	21	13
(Malaysia) Goh S F (Malaysia) N Izzuddin	21	21
(France) C Popov (France) T J Popov	16	11

Quarter-finals
3	(Japan) T Hoki (Japan) Y Kobayashi	23	21
(Malaysia) Goh S F (Malaysia) N Izzuddin	21	15

=== Bottom half ===
==== Section 3 ====
First round
PFQ	(India) I Bhatnagar (India) K. S Pratheek	20	19
(Japan) A Koga (Japan) T Saito	22	21
(India) M Attri (India) B. S Reddy	16	13
5	(Indonesia) F Alfian (Indonesia) M R Ardianto	21	21
(Japan) K Matsui (Japan) Y Takeuchi	21	14	21
(Indonesia) S K Gutama (Indonesia) M R P Isfahani	17	21	19
(Indonesia) W Nayaka (Indonesia) A Y Santoso	21	15	21
PFQ	(Norway) T Flåtten (Norway) V Rikheim	17	21	12

Second round
(Japan) A Koga (Japan) T Saito	13	18
5	(Indonesia) F Alfian (Indonesia) M R Ardianto	21	21
(Japan) K Matsui (Japan) Y Takeuchi	21	21
(Indonesia) W Nayaka (Indonesia) A Y Santoso	17	15

Quarter-finals
5	(Indonesia) F Alfian (Indonesia) M R Ardianto	21	19	21
(Japan) K Matsui (Japan) Y Takeuchi	14	21	4

==== Section 4 ====
First round
(Chinese Taipei) Lee J-h (Chinese Taipei) Yang P-hs	21	19	21
(India) Arjun M.R. (India) D Kapila	12	21	19
Q4	(Thailand) W Phakjarung (Thailand) W Thongkham	21	12	9
6	(Malaysia) A Chia (Malaysia) Soh W Y	13	21	21
Q2	(Malaysia) N M Azriyn A (Malaysia) Lim K W	15	14
(Denmark) J Bay (Denmark) L Mølhede	21	21
Q1	(Chinese Taipei) Chang K-c (Chinese Taipei) Po L-w	15	21
2	(Chinese Taipei) Lee Y (Chinese Taipei) Wang C-l	21	23

Second round
(Chinese Taipei) Lee J-h (Chinese Taipei) Yang P-hs	18	16
6	(Malaysia) A Chia (Malaysia) Soh W Y	21	21
(Denmark) J Bay (Denmark) L Mølhede	15	14
2	(Chinese Taipei) Lee Y (Chinese Taipei) Wang C-l	21	21

Quarter-finals
6	(Malaysia) A Chia (Malaysia) Soh W Y	21	21
2	(Chinese Taipei) Lee Y (Chinese Taipei) Wang C-l	17	10

== Women's doubles ==
=== Seeds ===
1. (China) Chen Qingchen / Jia Yifan (quarter-finals)
2. (South Korea) Lee So-hee / Shin Seung-chan (quarter-finals)
3. (South Korea) Kim So-yeong / Kong Hee-yong (first round)
4. (Japan) Yuki Fukushima / Sayaka Hirota (quarter-finals)
5. (Japan) Mayu Matsumoto / Wakana Nagahara (final)
6. (Japan) Nami Matsuyama / Chiharu Shida (champions)
7. (Malaysia) Pearly Tan / Thinaah Muralitharan (semi-finals)
8. (Denmark) Maiken Fruergaard / Sara Thygesen (second round)

=== Finals ===
Semi-finals
6	(Japan) Nami Matsuyama (Japan) Chiharu Shida	21	21
7	(Malaysia) Pearly Tan (Malaysia) Thinaah Muralitharan	17	17
5	(Japan) Mayu Matsumoto (Japan) Wakana Nagahara	21	21
(China) Zhang Shuxian (China) Zheng Yu	18	14

Final
6	(Japan) Nami Matsuyama (Japan) Chiharu Shida	17	21	26
5	(Japan) Mayu Matsumoto (Japan) Wakana Nagahara	21	15	24

=== Top half ===
==== Section 1 ====
First round
1	(China) Chen QC (China) Jia YF	21	21
(Ukraine) M Stoliarenko (Ukraine) Y Zharka	13	4
Q1	(Thailand) S Mingchua (Thailand) P Rungruengpramong	21	20
PFQ	(Germany) S Küspert (Germany) E Moszczynski	23	22
6	(Japan) N Matsuyama (Japan) C Shida	18	21	21
PFQ	(China) Du Y (China) Li WM	21	15	10
(Japan) R Iwanaga (Japan) K Nakanishi	23	21	17
(South Korea) Jeong N-e (South Korea) Kim H-j	25	15	21

Second round
1	(China) Chen QC (China) Jia YF	21	21
PFQ	(Germany) S Küspert (Germany) E Moszczynski	8	8
6	(Japan) N Matsuyama (Japan) C Shida	21	21
(South Korea) Jeong N-e (South Korea) Kim H-j	15	18

Quarter-finals
1	(China) Chen QC (China) Jia YF	21	13	17
6	(Japan) N Matsuyama (Japan) C Shida	17	21	21

==== Section 2 ====
First round
4	(Japan) Y Fukushima (Japan) S Hirota	21	21
(Thailand) C Korepap (Thailand) J Sudjaipraparat	10	11
(Malaysia) V Hoo (Malaysia) Lim C S	16	21	21
(Chinese Taipei) Hsu Y-c (Chinese Taipei) Lin W-c	21	16	16
7	(Malaysia) P Tan (Malaysia) Thinaah M	21	21
(Indonesia) F D Kusuma (Indonesia) A C Pratiwi	18	19
(China) Liu XX (China) Xia YT	21	21
Q4	(Chinese Taipei) Lee C-h (Chinese Taipei) Teng C-h	15	10

Second round
4	(Japan) Y Fukushima (Japan) S Hirota	21	21
(Malaysia) V Hoo (Malaysia) Lim C S	9	8
7	(Malaysia) P Tan (Malaysia) Thinaah M	21	21
(China) Liu XX (China) Xia YT	17	11

Quarter-finals
4	(Japan) Y Fukushima (Japan) S Hirota	22	12
7	(Malaysia) P Tan (Malaysia) Thinaah M	24	21

=== Bottom half ===
==== Section 3 ====
First round
(India) K. A Bhat (India) S Gautam	21	21
Q2	(Thailand) K Dubthuk (Thailand) P Pattanawaritthipan	12	17
PFQ	(Chinese Taipei) Hu L-f (Chinese Taipei) Lin X-m	14	18
5	(Japan) M Matsumoto (Japan) W Nagahara	21	21
(Indonesia) Fitriani (Indonesia) R Hartawan	5	18
(Malaysia) A Cheong (Malaysia) Teoh M X	21	21
(South Korea) Baek H-n (South Korea) Lee Y-r	21	21
3	(South Korea) Kim S-y (South Korea) Kong H-y	18	11

Second round
(India) K. A Bhat (India) S Gautam	19	6
5	(Japan) M Matsumoto (Japan) W Nagahara	21	21
(Malaysia) A Cheong (Malaysia) Teoh M X	21	11	11
(South Korea) Baek H-n (South Korea) Lee Y-r	19	21	21

Quarter-finals
5	(Japan) M Matsumoto (Japan) W Nagahara	18	21	21
(South Korea) Baek H-n (South Korea) Lee Y-r	21	17	15

==== Section 4 ====
First round
(China) Zhang SX (China) Zheng Y	21	21
(Thailand) O Jongsathapornparn (Thailand) A Povanon	15	11
(India) H M Harinarayanan (India) A Roy	5	5
8	(Denmark) M Fruergaard (Denmark) S Thygesen	21	21
(Brazil) J Lima (Brazil) S Lima	21	21
PFQ	(India) P Arora (India) U Hooda	18	15
Q3	(Thailand) S Paewsampran (Thailand) P Supajirakul	9	14
2	(South Korea) Lee S-h (South Korea) Shin S-c	21	21

Second round
(China) Zhang SX (China) Zheng Y	21	21
8	(Denmark) M Fruergaard (Denmark) S Thygesen	14	15
(Brazil) J Lima (Brazil) S Lima	4	13
2	(South Korea) Lee S-h (South Korea) Shin S-c	21	21

Quarter-finals
(China) Zhang SX (China) Zheng Y	12	21	21
2	(South Korea) Lee S-h (South Korea) Shin S-c	21	17	17

== Mixed doubles ==
=== Seeds ===
1. (Thailand) Dechapol Puavaranukroh / Sapsiree Taerattanachai (final)
2. (China) Zheng Siwei / Huang Yaqiong (champions)
3. (Japan) Yuta Watanabe / Arisa Higashino (semi-finals)
4. (China) Wang Yilyu / Huang Dongping (semi-finals)
5. (Malaysia) Tan Kian Meng / Lai Pei Jing (first round)
6. (Malaysia) Goh Soon Huat / Shevon Jemie Lai (quarter-finals)
7. (Denmark) Mathias Christiansen / Alexandra Bøje (second round)
8. (Japan) Yuki Kaneko / Misaki Matsutomo (second round)

=== Finals ===
Semi-finals
1	(Thailand) Dechapol Puavaranukroh (Thailand) Sapsiree Taerattanachai	16	21	21
4	(China) Wang Yilyu (China) Huang Dongping	21	12	16
3	(Japan) Yuta Watanabe (Japan) Arisa Higashino	21	8	21
2	(China) Zheng Siwei (China) Huang Yaqiong	18	21	23

Final
1	(Thailand) Dechapol Puavaranukroh (Thailand) Sapsiree Taerattanachai	12	21	14
2	(China) Zheng Siwei (China) Huang Yaqiong	21	18	21

=== Top half ===
==== Section 1 ====
First round
1	(Thailand) D Puavaranukroh (Thailand) S Taerattanachai	13	21	21
(Indonesia) R N Kusharjanto (Indonesia) L A Kusumawati	21	16	13
(Chinese Taipei) Lee J-h (Chinese Taipei) Hsu Y-c	21	21
Q1	(Thailand) K Imnark (Thailand) P Phatcharaphisutsin	14	14
8	(Japan) Y Kaneko (Japan) M Matsutomo	21	21
(India) B. S Reddy (India) A Ponnappa	17	17
(Japan) K Yamashita (Japan) N Shinoya	21	21
(India) M R Raju (India) A K Jamaludeen	12	13

Second round
1	(Thailand) D Puavaranukroh (Thailand) S Taerattanachai	21	21
(Chinese Taipei) Lee J-h (Chinese Taipei) Hsu Y-c	15	19
8	(Japan) Y Kaneko (Japan) M Matsutomo	16	16
(Japan) K Yamashita (Japan) N Shinoya	21	21

Quarter-finals
1	(Thailand) D Puavaranukroh (Thailand) S Taerattanachai	21	21
(Japan) K Yamashita (Japan) N Shinoya	15	8

==== Section 2 ====
First round
4	(China) Wang YL (China) Huang DP	21	21
PFQ	(Thailand) V Kanjanakeereewong (Thailand) N Laisuan	7	16
Q4	(Indonesia) D Ferdinansyah (Indonesia) G E Widjaja	21	21
(Germany) J C Völker (Germany) S Küspert	9	14
5	(Malaysia) Tan K M (Malaysia) Lai P J	17	21	13
(Germany) J R Jansen (Germany) L Efler	21	16	21
(Thailand) S Jomkoh (Thailand) S Paewsampran	21	21
(Brazil) F Farias (Brazil) J Lima	5	6

Second round
4	(China) Wang YL (China) Huang DP	21	21
Q4	(Indonesia) D Ferdinansyah (Indonesia) G E Widjaja	17	18
(Germany) J R Jansen (Germany) L Efler	17	21	16
(Thailand) S Jomkoh (Thailand) S Paewsampran	21	18	21

Quarter-finals
4	(China) Wang YL (China) Huang DP	21	21
(Thailand) S Jomkoh (Thailand) S Paewsampran	16	15

=== Bottom half ===
==== Section 3 ====
First round
(India) I Bhatnagar (India) T Crasto	w	/	o
(United States) M Fogarty (United States) I Zhong
(United States) V Chiu (United States) J Gai	13	12
6	(Malaysia) Goh S H (Malaysia) S J Lai	21	21
(India) V G Prasad (India) J Dewangan	15	11
(Indonesia) Z J Sumanti (Indonesia) H Julimarbela	21	21
Q3	(Thailand) R Makkasasithorn (Thailand) J Sudjaipraparat	12	7
3	(Japan) Y Watanabe (Japan) A Higashino	21	21

Second round
(India) I Bhatnagar (India) T Crasto	19	20
6	(Malaysia) Goh S H (Malaysia) S J Lai	21	22
(Indonesia) Z J Sumanti (Indonesia) H Julimarbela	8	12
3	(Japan) Y Watanabe (Japan) A Higashino	21	21

Quarter-finals
6	(Malaysia) Goh S H (Malaysia) S J Lai	18	17
3	(Japan) Y Watanabe (Japan) A Higashino	21	21

==== Section 4 ====
First round
Q2	(Indonesia) A B Cahyono (Indonesia) M G Islami	21	21
(Egypt) A H Elgamal (Egypt) D Hany	16	14
(France) F Delrue (France) V Hériau	13	10
7	(Denmark) M Christiansen (Denmark) A Bøje	21	21
(England) G Mairs (England) J Moore	21	21
(Denmark) M Thyrri (Denmark) A Magelund	16	14
(Chinese Taipei) Yang P-h (Chinese Taipei) Hu L-f	21	12	11
2	(China) Zheng SW (China) Huang YQ	13	21	21

Second round
Q2	(Indonesia) A B Cahyono (Indonesia) M G Islami	21	21
7	(Denmark) M Christiansen (Denmark) A Bøje	17	13
(England) G Mairs (England) J Moore	12	15
2	(China) Zheng SW (China) Huang YQ	21	21

Quarter-finals
Q2	(Indonesia) A B Cahyono (Indonesia) M G Islami	16	14
2	(China) Zheng SW (China) Huang YQ	21	21

Preceded by 2022 Korea Masters	BWF World Tour; 2022 BWF season	Succeeded by 2022 Indonesia Masters
