= 2024 Indonesia Open =

Tournament details
- Dates: 4–9 June
- Level: Super 1000
- Total prize money: US$1,300,000
- Venue: Istora Gelora Bung Karno
- Location: Jakarta, Indonesia

Champions
- Men's singles: (China) Shi Yuqi
- Women's singles: (China) Chen Yufei
- Men's doubles: (China) Liang Weikeng (China) Wang Chang
- Women's doubles: (South Korea) Baek Ha-na (South Korea) Lee So-hee
- Mixed doubles: (China) Jiang Zhenbang (China) Wei Yaxin

The 2024 Indonesia Open (officially known as the Kapal Api Indonesia Open 2024 for sponsorship reasons) was a badminton tournament held in Jakarta, Indonesia, from 4 to 9 June 2024. It had a total prize of US$1,300,000.

== Tournament ==
The 2024 Indonesia Open tournament was the fifteenth tournament of the 2024 BWF World Tour and also part of Indonesia Open which had been held since 1982 and is organized by the Badminton Association of Indonesia and sanctioned by the BWF.

=== Venue ===
The tournament was held at the Istora Gelora Bung Karno inside the Gelora Bung Karno Sports Complex in Central Jakarta, Jakarta, Indonesia.

=== Point distribution ===
Below is the point distribution table for each phase of the tournament based on the BWF points system for the BWF World Tour Super 1000 event.

Winner	Runner-up	3/4	5/8	9/16	17/32
12,000	10,200	8,400	6,600	4,800	3,000

=== Prize money ===
The total prize money for this tournament is US$1,300,000. The distribution of the prize money was in accordance with BWF regulations.

Event	Winner	Finalist	Semi-finals	Quarter-finals	Last 16	Last 32
Singles	$91,000	$44,200	$18,200	$7,150	$3,900	$1,300
Doubles	$96,200	$45,500	$18,200	$8,125	$4,225	$1,300

== Men's singles ==
=== Seeds ===
1. (Denmark) Viktor Axelsen (withdrew)
2. (China) Shi Yuqi (champion)
3. (Indonesia) Jonatan Christie (first round)
4. (Denmark) Anders Antonsen (final)
5. (Japan) Kodai Naraoka (first round)
6. (China) Li Shifeng (semi-finals)
7. (Indonesia) Anthony Sinisuka Ginting (first round)
8. (Thailand) Kunlavut Vitidsarn (semi-finals)

=== Finals ===
Semi-finals
4	(Denmark) Anders Antonsen	21	19	21
8	(Thailand) Kunlavut Vitidsarn	15	21	11
6	(China) Li Shifeng	21	19	14
2	(China) Shi Yuqi	19	21	21

Final
4	(Denmark) Anders Antonsen	9	21	14
2	(China) Shi Yuqi	21	12	21

=== Top half ===
==== Section 1 ====
First round
4	(Denmark) A Antonsen	21	21
(Hong Kong) Lee C Y	14	10
PFR	(Thailand) K Wangcharoen	21	21
(Indonesia) C A D Wardoyo	16	9
7	(Indonesia) A S Ginting	21	11	8
(Japan) K Nishimoto	17	21	21
(Japan) K Tsuneyama	12	17
(India) L Sen	21	21

Second round
4	(Denmark) A Antonsen	21	21
PFR	(Thailand) K Wangcharoen	17	11
(Japan) K Nishimoto	9	15
(India) L Sen	21	21

Quarter-finals
4	(Denmark) A Antonsen	24	21
(India) L Sen	22	18

==== Section 2 ====
First round
8	(Thailand) K Vitidsarn	21	21
(Singapore) Loh K Y	13	10
(India) Prannoy H. S.	17	12
(India) P Rajawat	21	21
(Malaysia) Lee Z J	21	21
(Hong Kong) Ng K L	17	16
(India) K George	21	10	20
(China) Weng HY	11	21	22

Second round
8	(Thailand) K Vitidsarn	21	21
(India) P Rajawat	10	16
(Malaysia) Lee Z J	20	21	21
(China) Weng HY	22	9	16

Quarter-finals
8	(Thailand) K Vitidsarn	21	21
(Malaysia) Lee Z J	16	17

=== Bottom half ===
==== Section 3 ====
First round
(France) C Popov	21	21
PFR	(Belgium) J Carraggi	16	10
(Canada) B Yang	18	12
6	(China) Li SF	21	21
(Chinese Taipei) Chou T-c	21	21
(Chinese Taipei) Lin C-y	17	14
PFR	(Malaysia) Leong J H	21	16	21
3	(Indonesia) J Christie	13	21	12

Second round
(France) C Popov	11	13
6	(China) Li SF	21	21
(Chinese Taipei) Chou T-c	18	21	17
PFR	(Malaysia) Leong J H	21	13	21

Quarter-finals
6	(China) Li SF	21	21
PFR	(Malaysia) Leong J H	11	12

==== Section 4 ====
First round
(Chinese Taipei) Wang T-w	15	21	27
(France) T J Popov	21	12	29
(Denmark) R Gemke	21	21
5	(Japan) K Naraoka	12	10
(Chinese Taipei) Su L-y	21	19	17
(China) Lu GZ	14	21	21
(China) Lei LX	16	13
2	(China) Shi YQ	21	21

Second round
(France) T J Popov	21	8	21
(Denmark) R Gemke	18	21	12
(China) Lu GZ	16	16
2	(China) Shi YQ	21	21

Quarter-finals
(France) T J Popov	21	10	18
2	(China) Shi YQ	17	21	21

== Women's singles ==
=== Seeds ===
1. (South Korea) An Se-young (final)
2. (China) Chen Yufei (champion)
3. (Spain) Carolina Marín (semi-finals)
4. (Chinese Taipei) Tai Tzu-ying (withdrew)
5. (Japan) Akane Yamaguchi (withdrew)
6. (China) Wang Zhiyi (semi-finals)
7. (China) Han Yue (quarter-finals)
8. (China) He Bingjiao (quarter-finals)

=== Finals ===
Semi-finals
1	(South Korea) An Se-young	23	21
6	(China) Wang Zhiyi	21	13
3	(Spain) Carolina Marín	11	21	13
2	(China) Chen Yufei	21	17	21

Final
1	(South Korea) An Se-young	14	21	18
2	(China) Chen Yufei	21	14	21

=== Top half ===
==== Section 1 ====
First round
1	(South Korea) An S-y	20	21	21
(Japan) T Miyazaki	22	7	11
(Canada) M Li	21	9	21
PFR	(Thailand) P Choeikeewong	19	21	23
8	(China) He BJ	13	21	21
(Denmark) L Kjærsfeldt	21	15	17
(Scotland) K Gilmour	21	21
(Vietnam) Nguyễn T L	10	18

Second round
1	(South Korea) An S-y	21	21
PFR	(Thailand) P Choeikeewong	16	6
8	(China) He BJ	21	21
(Scotland) K Gilmour	17	9

Quarter-finals
1	(South Korea) An S-y	21	21
8	(China) He BJ	17	14

==== Section 2 ====
First round
6	(China) Wang ZY	21	21
(Malaysia) Goh J W	15	17
(Japan) N Okuhara	17	16
(Indonesia) E N T Wardoyo	21	21
(Indonesia) G M Tunjung	21	21
(Indonesia) P K Wardani	14	17
(Thailand) S Katethong	21	21
(Thailand) P Chochuwong	17	18

Second round
6	(China) Wang ZY	21	21
(Indonesia) E N T Wardoyo	13	13
(Indonesia) G M Tunjung	21	21
(Thailand) S Katethong	13	15

Quarter-finals
6	(China) Wang ZY	21	21
(Indonesia) G M Tunjung	8	18

=== Bottom half ===
==== Section 3 ====
First round
PFR	(Myanmar) Thet Htar T	14	8
(China) Gao FJ	21	21
(United States) BW Zhang	18	21	19
7	(China) Han Y	21	16	21
(Chinese Taipei) Hsu W-c	21	15	21
(India) P. V. Sindhu	15	21	14
(China) Zhang YM	16	18
3	(Spain) C Marín	21	21

Second round
(China) Gao FJ	17	21	12
7	(China) Han Y	21	18	21
(Chinese Taipei) Hsu W-c	12	7
3	(Spain) C Marín	21	21

Quarter-finals
7	(China) Han Y	8	6
3	(Spain) C Marín	21	21

==== Section 4 ====
First round
(Thailand) R Intanon	21	21
PFR	(India) A Kashyap	18	6
(Chinese Taipei) Sung S-y	w	/	o
5	(Japan) A Yamaguchi
(Japan) A Ohori	19	21	21
(Chinese Taipei) Pai Y-p	21	17	18
(Germany) Y Li	14	10
2	(China) Chen YF	21	21

Second round
(Thailand) R Intanon	22	14	17
(Chinese Taipei) Sung S-y	20	21	21
(Japan) A Ohori	10	11
2	(China) Chen YF	21	21

Quarter-finals
(Chinese Taipei) Sung S-y	15	7
2	(China) Chen YF	21	21

== Men's doubles ==
=== Seeds ===
1. (India) Satwiksairaj Rankireddy / Chirag Shetty (withdrew)
2. (China) Liang Weikeng / Wang Chang (champions)
3. (South Korea) Kang Min-hyuk / Seo Seung-jae (first round)
4. (Denmark) Kim Astrup / Anders Skaarup Rasmussen (semi-finals)
5. (Malaysia) Aaron Chia / Soh Wooi Yik (second round)
6. (Japan) Takuro Hoki / Yugo Kobayashi (first round)
7. (Indonesia) Fajar Alfian / Muhammad Rian Ardianto (first round)
8. (China) Liu Yuchen / Ou Xuanyi (first round)

=== Finals ===
Semi-finals
(Malaysia) Man Wei Chong (Malaysia) Tee Kai Wun	29	21
(Indonesia) Sabar Karyaman Gutama (Indonesia) Muhammad Reza Pahlevi Isfahani	27	13
4	(Denmark) Kim Astrup (Denmark) Anders Skaarup Rasmussen	13	15
2	(China) Liang Weikeng (China) Wang Chang	21	21

Final
(Malaysia) Man Wei Chong (Malaysia) Tee Kai Wun	21	16	12
2	(China) Liang Weikeng (China) Wang Chang	19	21	21

=== Top half ===
==== Section 1 ====
First round
3	(South Korea) Kang M-h (South Korea) Seo S-j	22	16	17
(Malaysia) Man W C (Malaysia) Tee K W	20	21	21
(Denmark) R Kjær (Denmark) F Søgaard	21	23
(China) Chen BY (China) Liu Y	18	21
5	(Malaysia) A Chia (Malaysia) Soh W Y	21	21
(United States) V Chiu (United States) J Yuan	14	11
(Chinese Taipei) Lu C-y (Chinese Taipei) Yang P-ha	21	21
(Germany) B Geiss (Germany) J C Voelker	15	16

Second round
(Malaysia) Man W C (Malaysia) Tee K W	21	19	21
(Denmark) R Kjær (Denmark) F Søgaard	18	21	12
5	(Malaysia) A Chia (Malaysia) Soh W Y	16	14
(Chinese Taipei) Lu C-y (Chinese Taipei) Yang P-ha	21	21

Quarter-finals
(Malaysia) Man W C (Malaysia) Tee K W	21	18	21
(Chinese Taipei) Lu C-y (Chinese Taipei) Yang P-ha	17	21	10

==== Section 2 ====
First round
6	(Japan) T Hoki (Japan) Y Kobayashi	21	18	12
(China) He JT (China) Ren XY	9	21	21
(Chinese Taipei) Lee J-h (Chinese Taipei) Yang P-hs	19	21	21
(Malaysia) Low H Y (Malaysia) Ng E C	21	14	14
(Chinese Taipei) Lee Y (Chinese Taipei) Wang C-l	18	21	21
(Malaysia) Choong H J (Malaysia) M Haikal	21	16	17
PFR	(Indonesia) R Hidayat (Indonesia) Y Rambitan	26	22	24
(Indonesia) S K Gutama (Indonesia) M R P Isfahani	24	24	26

Second round
(China) He JT (China) Ren XY	16	23	17
(Chinese Taipei) Lee J-h (Chinese Taipei) Yang P-hs	21	21	21
(Chinese Taipei) Lee Y (Chinese Taipei) Wang C-l	11	18
(Indonesia) S K Gutama (Indonesia) M R P Isfahani	21	21

Quarter-finals
(Chinese Taipei) Lee J-h (Chinese Taipei) Yang P-hs	17	21	16
(Indonesia) S K Gutama (Indonesia) M R P Isfahani	21	14	21

=== Bottom half ===
==== Section 3 ====
First round
(Scotland) A Dunn (Scotland) A Hall	18	21
(France) C Popov (France) T J Popov	21	23
(Indonesia) M S Fikri (Indonesia) B Maulana	18	21	21
8	(China) Liu YC (China) Ou XY	21	18	18
(Algeria) K Mammeri (Algeria) Y S Medel	10	23
(Japan) K Mitsuhashi (Japan) H Okamura	21	25
(Chinese Taipei) Lee F-c (Chinese Taipei) Lee F-j	15	19
4	(Denmark) K Astrup (Denmark) A S Rasmussen	21	21

Second round
(France) C Popov (France) T J Popov	11	17
(Indonesia) M S Fikri (Indonesia) B Maulana	21	21
(Japan) K Mitsuhashi (Japan) H Okamura	19	10
4	(Denmark) K Astrup (Denmark) A S Rasmussen	21	21

Quarter-finals
(Indonesia) M S Fikri (Indonesia) B Maulana	16	21	21
4	(Denmark) K Astrup (Denmark) A S Rasmussen	21	15	23

==== Section 4 ====
First round
(Canada) A Dong (Canada) N Yakura	6	7
(Malaysia) Goh S F (Malaysia) N Izzuddin	21	21
(Indonesia) L R Carnando (Indonesia) D Marthin	21	21
7	(Indonesia) F Alfian (Indonesia) M R Ardianto	14	17
(Indonesia) M Ahsan (Indonesia) H Setiawan	19	21	21
(Thailand) S Jomkoh (Thailand) K Kedren	21	12	13
(China) Xie HN (China) Zeng WH	16	9
2	(China) Liang WK (China) Wang C	21	21

Second round
(Malaysia) Goh S F (Malaysia) N Izzuddin	16	21	21
(Indonesia) L R Carnando (Indonesia) D Marthin	21	16	12
(Indonesia) M Ahsan (Indonesia) H Setiawan	21	20	18
2	(China) Liang WK (China) Wang C	17	22	21

Quarter-finals
(Malaysia) Goh S F (Malaysia) N Izzuddin	21	18	19
2	(China) Liang WK (China) Wang C	18	21	21

== Women's doubles ==
=== Seeds ===
1. (China) Chen Qingchen / Jia Yifan (final)
2. (South Korea) Baek Ha-na / Lee So-hee (champions)
3. (China) Liu Shengshu / Tan Ning (semi-finals)
4. (Japan) Nami Matsuyama / Chiharu Shida (second round)
5. (China) Zhang Shuxian / Zheng Yu (quarter final)
6. (South Korea) Kim So-yeong / Kong Hee-yong (quarter-finals)
7. (Japan) Mayu Matsumoto / Wakana Nagahara (semi-finals)
8. (Indonesia) Apriyani Rahayu / Siti Fadia Silva Ramadhanti (second round)

=== Finals ===
Semi-finals
1	(China) Chen Qingchen (China) Jia Yifan	21	15	21
7	(Japan) Mayu Matsumoto (Japan) Wakana Nagahara	10	21	17
3	(China) Liu Shengshu (China) Tan Ning	11	14
2	(South Korea) Baek Ha-na (South Korea) Lee So-hee	21	21

Final
1	(China) Chen Qingchen (China) Jia Yifan	17	13
2	(South Korea) Baek Ha-na (South Korea) Lee So-hee	21	21

=== Top half ===
==== Section 1 ====
First round
(France) M Lambert (France) A Tran	21	21
(China) Li WM (China) Liu XX	19	18
8	(Indonesia) A Rahayu (Indonesia) S F S Ramadhanti	21	16	21
(Thailand) J Kititharakul (Thailand) R Prajongjai	17	21	14
(Malaysia) P Tan (Malaysia) Thinaah M	21	22
(Chinese Taipei) Sung S-y (Chinese Taipei) Yu C-h	19	20

Second round
1	(China) Chen QC (China) Jia YF	21	21
(France) M Lambert (France) A Tran	17	19
8	(Indonesia) A Rahayu (Indonesia) S F S Ramadhanti	18	19
(Malaysia) P Tan (Malaysia) Thinaah M	21	21

Quarter-finals
1	(China) Chen QC (China) Jia YF	22	21
(Malaysia) P Tan (Malaysia) Thinaah M	20	18

==== Section 2 ====
First round
4	(Japan) N Matsuyama (Japan) C Shida	21	21
(United States) F Corbett (United States) A Lee	14	17
(Thailand) O Jongsathapornparn (Thailand) S Suwachai	8	7
(China) Li YJ (China) Luo XM	21	21
7	(Japan) M Matsumoto (Japan) W Nagahara	24	18	21
(Denmark) J Finne-Ipsen (Denmark) M Surrow	22	21	15
(India) T Jolly (India) G Gopichand	21	21
(Chinese Taipei) Cheng Y-p (Chinese Taipei) Sun Y-h	15	11

Second round
4	(Japan) N Matsuyama (Japan) C Shida	19	15
(China) Li YJ (China) Luo XM	21	21
7	(Japan) M Matsumoto (Japan) W Nagahara	19	21	21
(India) T Jolly (India) G Gopichand	21	19	19

Quarter-finals
(China) Li YJ (China) Luo XM	19	17
7	(Japan) M Matsumoto (Japan) W Nagahara	21	21

=== Bottom half ===
==== Section 3 ====
First round
(Denmark) M Fruergaard (Denmark) S Thygesen	21	21
(Indonesia) J P Miantoro (Indonesia) F Setianingrum	12	18
(Chinese Taipei) Hsu Y-c (Chinese Taipei) Lin W-c	13	11
5	(China) Zhang SX (China) Zheng Y	21	21
(Ukraine) P Buhrova (Ukraine) Y Kantemyr	17	18
(Chinese Taipei) Chang C-h (Chinese Taipei) Yang C-t	21	21
(Indonesia) F D Kusuma (Indonesia) A C Pratiwi	13	12
3	(China) Liu SS (China) Tan N	21	21

Second round
(Denmark) M Fruergaard (Denmark) S Thygesen	15	19
5	(China) Zhang SX (China) Zheng Y	21	21
(Chinese Taipei) Chang C-h (Chinese Taipei) Yang C-t	7	12
3	(China) Liu SS (China) Tan N	21	21

Quarter-finals
5	(China) Zhang SX (China) Zheng Y	12	10
3	(China) Liu SS (China) Tan N	21	21

==== Section 4 ====
First round
(Malaysia) V Hoo (Malaysia) Lim C S	17	18
(Hong Kong) Yeung N T (Hong Kong) Yeung P L	21	21
(India) R Panda (India) S Panda	12	9
6	(South Korea) Kim S-y (South Korea) Kong H-y	21	21
(India) T Crasto (India) A Ponnappa	21	21
(Canada) J Dent (Canada) C Lai	15	15

Second round
(Hong Kong) Yeung N T (Hong Kong) Yeung P L	13	11
6	(South Korea) Kim S-y (South Korea) Kong H-y	21	21
(India) T Crasto (India) A Ponnappa	13	21	13
2	(South Korea) Baek H-n (South Korea) Lee S-h	21	19	21

Quarter-finals
6	(South Korea) Kim S-y (South Korea) Kong H-y	10	21	10
2	(South Korea) Baek H-n (South Korea) Lee S-h	21	16	21

== Mixed doubles ==
=== Seeds ===
1. (China) Zheng Siwei / Huang Yaqiong (final)
2. (China) Feng Yanzhe / Huang Dongping (quarter-finals)
3. (Japan) Yuta Watanabe / Arisa Higashino (first round)
4. (South Korea) Seo Seung-jae / Chae Yoo-jung (second round)
5. (China) Jiang Zhenbang / Wei Yaxin (champions)
6. (Thailand) Dechapol Puavaranukroh / Sapsiree Taerattanachai (semi-finals)
7. (Hong Kong) Tang Chun Man / Tse Ying Suet (quarter-finals)
8. (South Korea) Kim Won-ho / Jeong Na-eun (quarter-finals)

=== Finals ===
Semi-finals
1	(China) Zheng Siwei (China) Huang Yaqiong	21	21
6	(Thailand) Dechapol Puavaranukroh (Thailand) Sapsiree Taerattanachai	19	19
(Malaysia) Tan Kian Meng (Malaysia) Lai Pei Jing	16	18
5	(China) Jiang Zhenbang (China) Wei Yaxin	21	21

Final
1	(China) Zheng Siwei (China) Huang Yaqiong	11	14
5	(China) Jiang Zhenbang (China) Wei Yaxin	21	21

=== Top half ===
==== Section 1 ====
First round
1	(China) Zheng SW (China) Huang YQ	21	21	21
(Indonesia) R N Kusharjanto (Indonesia) L A Kusumawati	23	15	13
(India) B S Reddy (India) N S Reddy	18	21	21
(United States) V Chiu (United States) J Gai	21	16	17
7	(Hong Kong) Tang C M (Hong Kong) Tse Y S	21	21
(Malaysia) Choong H J (Malaysia) Go P K	15	18
(Malaysia) Goh S H (Malaysia) Lai S J	21	17	10
(Hong Kong) Lee C H (Hong Kong) Ng T Y	16	21	21

Second round
1	(China) Zheng SW (China) Huang YQ	21	21
(India) B S Reddy (India) N S Reddy	9	11
7	(Hong Kong) Tang C M (Hong Kong) Tse Y S	19	21	21
(Hong Kong) Lee C H (Hong Kong) Ng T Y	21	17	13

Quarter-finals
1	(China) Zheng SW (China) Huang YQ	21	21
7	(Hong Kong) Tang C M (Hong Kong) Tse Y S	17	10

==== Section 2 ====
First round
4	(South Korea) Seo S-j (South Korea) Chae Y-j	21	21
(Malaysia) Chen T J (Malaysia) Toh E W	13	15
(Chinese Taipei) Ye H-w (Chinese Taipei) Lee C-h	19	19
(Indonesia) D Ferdinansyah (Indonesia) G E Widjaja	21	21
6	(Thailand) D Puavaranukroh (Thailand) S Taerattanachai	21	18	23
(Thailand) S Jomkoh (Thailand) S Paewsampran	15	21	21
(Indonesia) A Maulana (Indonesia) N V Marwah	21	21
(Germany) J C Voelker (Germany) I Lohau	11	19

Second round
4	(South Korea) Seo S-j (South Korea) Chae Y-j	15	21	4
(Indonesia) D Ferdinansyah (Indonesia) G E Widjaja	21	15	21
6	(Thailand) D Puavaranukroh (Thailand) S Taerattanachai	21	21
(Indonesia) A Maulana (Indonesia) N V Marwah	8	13

Quarter-finals
(Indonesia) D Ferdinansyah (Indonesia) G E Widjaja	16	17
6	(Thailand) D Puavaranukroh (Thailand) S Taerattanachai	21	21

=== Bottom half ===
==== Section 3 ====
First round
(Netherlands) R Tabeling (Netherlands) S Piek	19	21	21
(United States) P Smith (United States) A Lee	21	18	12
(Japan) H Midorikawa (Japan) N Saito	13	21	11
8	(South Korea) Kim W-h (South Korea) Jeong N-e	21	17	21
(Algeria) K Mammeri (Algeria) T Mammeri	9	15
(Malaysia) Tan K M (Malaysia) Lai P J	21	21
(Denmark) M Christiansen (Denmark) A Bøje	18	21	0
3	(Japan) Y Watanabe (Japan) A Higashino	21	11	0^{r}

Second round
(Netherlands) R Tabeling (Netherlands) S Piek	15	18
8	(South Korea) Kim W-h (South Korea) Jeong N-e	21	21
(Malaysia) Tan K M (Malaysia) Lai P J	15	23	21
(Denmark) M Christiansen (Denmark) A Bøje	21	21	14

Quarter-finals
8	(South Korea) Kim W-h (South Korea) Jeong N-e	8	19
(Malaysia) Tan K M (Malaysia) Lai P J	21	21

==== Section 4 ====
First round
(Indonesia) R Rivaldy (Indonesia) P H Mentari	16	21	17
(Chinese Taipei) Yang P-hs (Chinese Taipei) Hu L-f	21	18	21
PFR	(Malaysia) Yap R K (Malaysia) V Siow	21	13	18
5	(China) Jiang ZB (China) Wei YX	19	21	21
(Japan) Y Kaneko (Japan) M Matsutomo	21	22
(Singapore) T Hee (Singapore) J Tan	19	20
(China) Guo XW (China) Chen FH	16	21	16
2	(China) Feng YZ (China) Huang DP	21	18	21

Second round
(Chinese Taipei) Yang P-hs (Chinese Taipei) Hu L-f	12	7
5	(China) Jiang ZB (China) Wei YX	21	21
(Japan) Y Kaneko (Japan) M Matsutomo	10	20
2	(China) Feng YZ (China) Huang DP	21	22

Quarter-finals
5	(China) Jiang ZB (China) Wei YX	21	11	21
2	(China) Feng YZ (China) Huang DP	17	21	16

Preceded by 2024 Singapore Open	BWF World Tour; 2024 BWF season	Succeeded by 2024 Australian Open
