= Lee Zii Jia =

Malaysian badminton player (born 1999)

Lee Zii Jia 李梓嘉
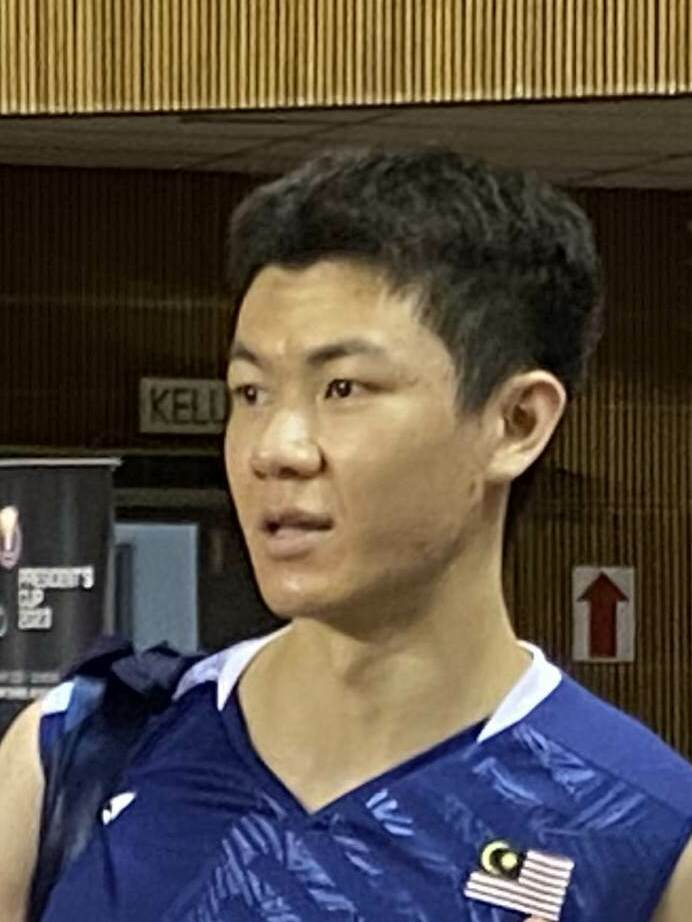
- Lee in 2023

Personal information
- Born: 29 March 1998 (age 28) Alor Setar, Kedah, Malaysia
- Height: 1.86 m (6 ft 1 in)

Sport
- Country: Malaysia
- Sport: Badminton
- Coached by: Liew Daren

Men's singles
- Career record: 318 wins, 153 losses
- Highest ranking: 2 (25 October 2022)
- Current ranking: 43 (10 November 2026)
- BWF profile
Medal record
Men's badminton
Representing Malaysia
Olympic Games
Bronze medal – third place	2024 Paris	Men's singles
Sudirman Cup
Bronze medal – third place	2021 Vantaa	Mixed team
Bronze medal – third place	2023 Suzhou	Mixed team
Thomas Cup
Bronze medal – third place	2024 Chengdu	Men's team
Asian Championships
Gold medal – first place	2022 Manila	Men's singles
Asia Team Championships
Gold medal – first place	2022 Selangor	Men's team
Silver medal – second place	2020 Manila	Men's team
Silver medal – second place	2024 Selangor	Men's team
Bronze medal – third place	2018 Alor Setar	Men's team
SEA Games
Gold medal – first place	2019 Philippines	Men's singles
Silver medal – second place	2017 Kuala Lumpur	Men's team
Silver medal – second place	2019 Philippines	Men's team
World Junior Championships
Silver medal – second place	2016 Bilbao	Mixed team
Bronze medal – third place	2016 Bilbao	Boys' singles

Lee Zii Jia ASK (Chinese: 李梓嘉; pinyin: Lǐ Zǐjiā; Pe̍h-ōe-jī: Lí Chú-ka, born 29 March 1998) is a Malaysian badminton player. He is a bronze medalist at the Olympic Games and Asian champion. He is best known for his smash, especially his backhand smash, physical agility, speed and reflexes in men's singles.

Lee was the men's singles gold medalist at the 2019 SEA Games and won his first BWF Super 1000 title at the 2021 All England Open. He was also the men's singles gold medalist at the 2022 Badminton Asia Championships. He won a bronze medal in the men's singles event at the 2024 Summer Olympics, becoming the third Malaysian men's singles player to win a medal at the Olympic Games after Rashid Sidek and Lee Chong Wei.

== Early life ==
Lee was born in Alor Setar, Kedah to Malaysian Chinese parents, Lee Chee Hin and Leow Siet Peng, whom are both school teachers and former basketball internationals. Oldest brother to Lee Zi Shan. He was first introduced to badminton by his parents at the age of 6. In his earlier years, he studied at Keat Hwa Primary School in Alor Setar, Kedah. Due to his results in the under 12 competition, he was soon drafted into the Bukit Jalil Sports School.

== Career ==
=== 2015 ===
In 2015, he became the junior champion in the Perak and Selangor Badminton Open. These standout performances and wins in the international circuit earned him a place in the Badminton Association of Malaysia.

=== 2016 ===
In November 2016, Lee won a bronze medal in the World Junior Championships after losing to Chico Aura Dwi Wardoyo in the semifinals. In the same month, he advanced to the final of India International Series but was defeated by Lakshya Sen.

=== 2017 ===
In February 2017, Lee reached the semifinals of the Thailand Masters, where he lost to Kantaphon Wangcharoen. In September 2017, he won his first senior title at the Polish International Series, against Soong Joo Ven in the final. In November 2017, Lee reached the semifinals of the Bitburger Open.

=== 2018 ===
In October 2018, Lee reached the final of the Chinese Taipei Open by defeating the World No. 4 men's singles player, Chou Tien-chen in the semifinals. He defeated Riichi Takeshita in the final to win his first BWF World Tour title and second international title overall. In doing so, he became the second Malaysian other than Lee Chong Wei to win a BWF top flight men's singles title since 2013. Lee then reached the final of the Korea Masters but lost to Son Wan-ho.

=== 2019 ===
Lee started the 2019 season by competing in the Thailand Masters. He lost in the quarter-finals to Brice Leverdez of France in straight games. In the next tournaments, he also finished in the quarter-finals in Malaysia Masters, Indonesia Masters, and German Open. He later lost in the early stage of Swiss, Malaysia, and Singapore Open's. In August, Lee finally managed to make it into the semi-finals in the Thailand Open, where he lost to Chou Tien-chen of Taiwan. This was nonetheless an improvement to his being a quarter finalist in New Zealand and Indonesia Open's.

He qualified to compete in 2019 World Championships in Basel, Switzerland, but lost to the World No. 1 men's singles player and the eventual World Champion, Kento Momota of Japan in the quarter-finals. In November, he was forced to retire in the second round of the China Open, and decided to withdraw as well from the next tournament in Hong Kong, due suffering from food poisoning and fever. Lee reached world No. 11 in the BWF World ranking on 12 November. In December, he won the men's singles gold medal at the SEA Games, and also helped the national men's team win the silver medal.

=== 2020: Entering the Top 10 world rankings ===
Lee opened the season by participating in Southeast Asian tours in Malaysia, Indonesia, and Thailand Masters, with his best result being a semi-finalist in Malaysia, where he lost to Kento Momota in straight games. In February, he was part of the Malaysia men's team, who won the silver medal at the Asia Team Championships, which he was the national team captain. He won 4 out of 5 matches in the Asia Team Championships, losing the final to Anthony Sinisuka Ginting.

Later in March, due to the outbreak of COVID-19 in Europe, the German Open was cancelled. Lee's next tournament was the All England Open, which was also his debut at the tournament because his ranking was previously too low to qualify. He won against Jonatan Christie, who had won in four previous matches. He continued this win streak against Lu Guangzu and the then-Olympic champion Chen Long. In the semi-finals, he lost to Viktor Axelsen. The match lasted for 73 minutes. Further, Lee's performance at the All England Open raised his world ranking to No. 10 on 17 March 2020.

=== 2021: All England Open title, Olympic debut ===
In March, Lee won his first Super 1000 tournament at the All England Open, defeating the defending champion Viktor Axelsen by a score of 30–29, 20–22, 21–9. In July, in the 2020 Tokyo Summer Olympics, Lee took part in the men's singles and won against Artem Pochtarov with a score of 21–5 and 21–11. In the subsequent match against Brice Leverdez, he won with a score of 21–17 and 21–5. Lee was eliminated in the round of 16, where he was defeated by Chen Long with a score of 21–8, 19–21, and 5–21.

In November, Lee reached the final of Hylo Open, however Lee had to retire due to the injuries he sustained while playing against Singapore's Loh Kean Yew with a score of 21–19, 13–21, 12–17. Lee ended the year at the 2021 World Championships in Huelva, where he retired from his quarterfinal match against eventual bronze medalist, Anders Antonsen.

=== 2022: Subsequent ban, Asian champion ===
In January, there were speculation that Lee intended to leave the Badminton Association of Malaysia (BAM), citing unhappiness with the association's demands and wanting more freedom as a player. He eventually resigned on 19 January 2022. In response, Lee was banned for two years from participating in any international tournaments that required BAM's approval as well as any Badminton World Federation (BWF)–sanctioned tournaments. With fellow players and the general public expressing dissatisfaction on BAM's decision, Lee appealed against the ban on 24 January 2022. The ban was lifted after Lee and BAM met on 25 January 2022, with the terms yet to be revealed.

In May, Lee won his first title of the year, the 2022 Badminton Asia Championships, defeating Indonesia's Jonatan Christie 21–17, 23–21 in straight sets. Lee became the sixth Malaysian men's singles player to win the Asian Championships title. On 22 May 2022, Lee won his first BWF World Tour Super 500 title at the 2022 Thailand Open, defeating China's Li Shifeng with a rubber set score of 17–21, 21–11, 23–21 in 70 minutes.

In June, Lee participated in 3 events: the Indonesia Masters, the Indonesia Open and the Malaysia Open, his home event. At the Indonesia Masters, Lee, the 5th seed, lost to the 4th seeded Anthony Sinisuka Ginting in the quarter-finals in three games, 21–18, 15–21, 16–21. A week later, Lee lost to Viktor Axelsen, the World No. 1 at the Indonesia Open semi-finals, with a score of 21–19, 11–21, 21–23 in 70 minutes. In late June, Lee took part in the Malaysia Open as the 5th seed. He surprisingly lost to Indonesia's Shesar Hiren Rhustavito in the Round of 16 in three games, 19–21, 21–19, 16–21 in an hour and six minutes.

Claiming injury, he decided to skip the Commonwealth Games and focus on the upcoming World Championships which would be held in August. As the fifth seed in 2022 World Championships, he lost to China's shuttler Zhao Junpeng in the third round in three games, with a match score of 19–21, 21–11, 19–21. The match lasted for an hour and five minutes. A week later, Lee lost to Srikanth Kidambi, the former World No. 1 at the first round of Japan Open, with a score of 20–22, 21–23 in 38 minutes.

In October, Lee defeated former World Champion Loh Kean Yew of Singapore, with a score of 21–18, 21–15 in 40 minutes and reached the Denmark Open final before losing to Shi Yuqi from China, with a score of 18–21, 21–16, 12–21 in 64 minutes. A few days later, Lee as 3rd seed in French Open, was surprised with another defeat at the first round, with a score of 18–21, 19–21 to the same opponent, Shesar Hiren Rhustavito from Indonesia that defeated him back in Malaysia Open earlier in June.

Australia Open was Lee's last hope of securing a final spot in the World Tour Finals. However, things did not go his way as one of his hands suffered a minor injury during the third game. He lost to Lu Guangzu from China in 70 minutes with a scoreline of 22–20, 15–21, 16–21, thus ending Lee's hopes to enter the World Tour Finals as Lu claimed the final spot.

In November, Lee decided to part ways with his coach Indra Wijaya, citing that he seeks to try 'something new' by foregoing a coach.

=== 2023: Slump, second Sudirman bronze ===
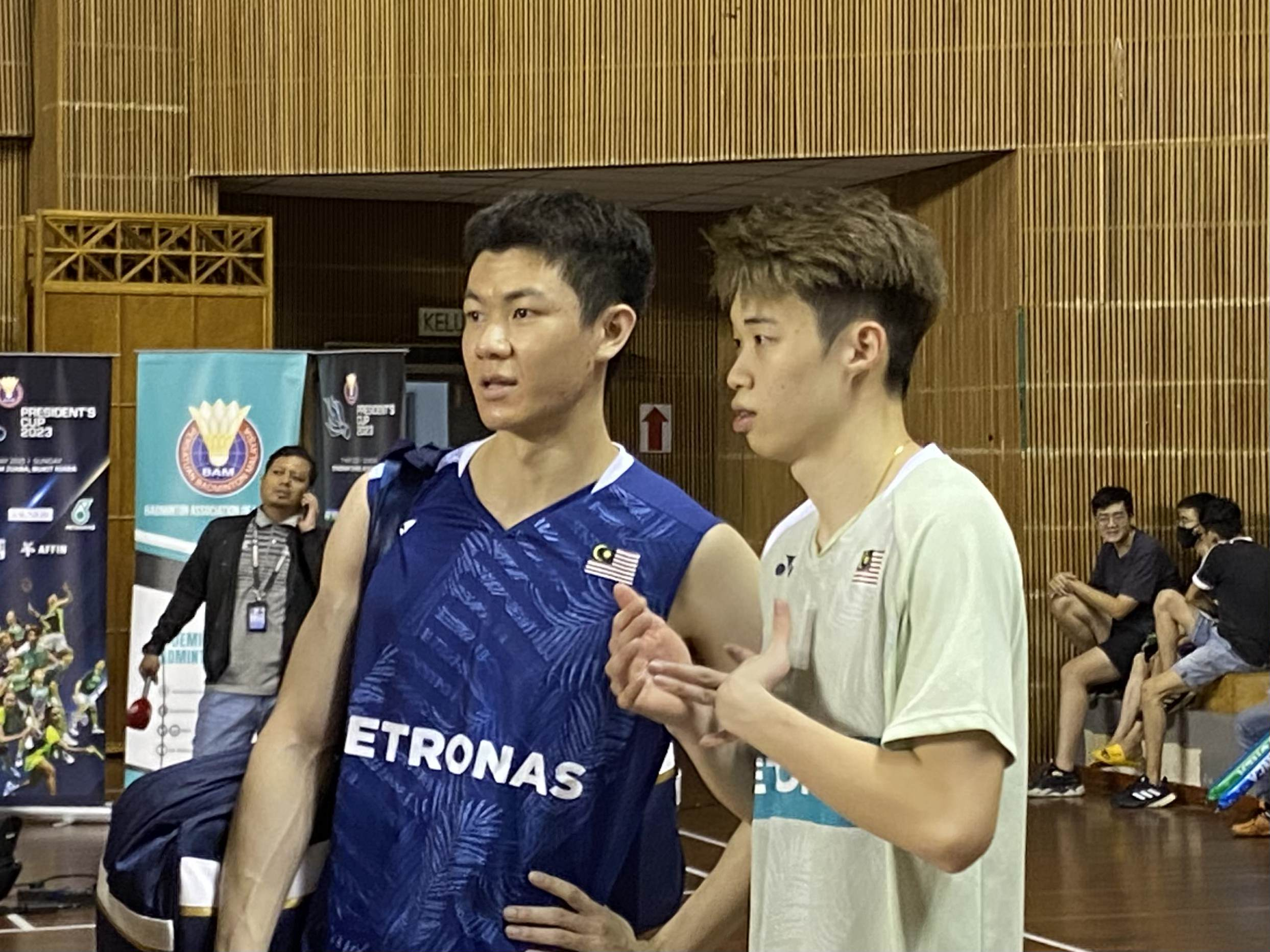
Lee Zii Jia and Ng Tze Yong at the 2023 President's Cup

Lee opened the 2023 season on his home ground, the Malaysia Open, but was defeated in the first round by the Japanese new rising player Kodai Naraoka. The following week, he reached the second round of the India Open, but was defeated by Chinese player Li Shifeng. He competed in the Indonesia Masters but lost in the second round to Hong Kong player Ng Ka Long.

Lee was called up to captain the Malaysian squad for the 2023 Badminton Asia Mixed Team Championships. In the round robin stage, he won against Bharath Lateesh of the United Arab Emirates and lost against Prannoy H. S. of India. He won against Lei Lanxi of China in the knockout stage.

Lee was featured on digital billboard in Times Square, New York as part of badminton brand, Victor's 55th anniversary on 9 March. Apart from Lee, other international badminton players such as Tai Tzu-ying, Anders Antonsen, Apriyani Rahayu, Siti Fadia Silva Ramadhanti, Hendra Setiawan and Mohammad Ahsan, were also on display. This makes Lee the first Malaysian badminton player to be featured on a Times Square billboard.

He competed in the German Open but lost in the second round to Chinese Taipei player Lee Chia-hao. On 26 April, Lee competed in the 2023 Badminton Asia Championships. He lost to Ng Ka Long in the first round with a score of 19–21, 16–21 in straight sets in 39 minutes and failed to defend his Asian Championships title.

In May, Lee represented Malaysia in the 2023 Sudirman Cup. He gain a 5 win streak against Ricky Tang, Srikanth Kidambi, Chou Tien-chen, Viktor Axelsen who retired in the quarterfinals, and Jeon Hyeok-jin. In the semifinals, Lee won against Korea in the men's single, but the Malaysia team lost to Korea with a 1–3 score and ended the tournament with a bronze medal. On 23 May, Lee announced on social media that he has enlisted Wong Tat Meng, previously the singles' head coach in Hong Kong, as his new coach.

In the home event 2023 Malaysia Masters, Lee defeated Lu Guangzu of China in straight games in the first round but was defeated by Lin Chun-yi of Chinese Taipei in rubber games in the second round. In June, Lee competed in the 2023 Singapore Open. He lost in the first round to Chinese player Weng Hongyang with a score of 20–22, 21–16, 19–21 in 64 minutes. Lee also competed in the 2023 Indonesia Open. He again lost in the first round to Indian player Lakshya Sen with a score of 17–21, 13–21 in straight games in only 33 minutes.

In response to his string of early exits in 2023 and dropping out of the top 10, he stated in a BWF interview that he considered taking a break from badminton tournaments.

In October, Lee joined Malaysia's squad at the 2022 Asian Games. He lost against Jeon Hyeok-jin at the men's team event, in which Malaysia conceded a 1–3 defeat against Korea. Lee fared better at the individual events, where he ended his four-match losing streak against Ng Ka Long and upset world champion Kunlavut Vitidsarn in the second round. His journey ended in the quarter-finals against the eventual bronze medalist, Prannoy H. S.

After 17 months from his last title at the 2022 Thailand Open in May, Lee finally managed to overcome early exits in the 2023 BWF World Tour season and won his first title of the year at the 2023 Arctic Open, defeating fellow Malaysian Ng Tze Yong 21–14, 21–15 in the final. He then entered his second consecutive final at the Denmark Open the following week. He was defeated by Weng Hongyang in straight sets, settling for second-best two years in a row.

=== 2024: Winning two titles and an Olympic bronze medal ===
In the home event Malaysia Open, Lee suffered from yet another first round defeat after losing to Lu Guangzu of China with a score of 21–16, 19–21, 15–21. Lee reached the quarter-finals of the India Open where he was defeated by Kodai Naraoka of Japan with a score of 21–13, 9–21, 16–21. Lee again reached the quarter-finals of the Indonesia Masters where he retired against Brian Yang of Canada due to food poisoning. In another first round defeat, Lee lost to Magnus Johannesen of Denmark with a score of 15–21, 19–21 in the French Open.

In the 2024 All England Open, Lee as a former champion in 2021 did not regain the title after he only reached the quarter-finals where he narrowly lost to Lakshya Sen of India with a score of 22–20, 16–21, 19–21. In the 2024 Swiss Open, Lee as top seed of the tournament crashed out in the second round to Srikanth Kidambi 16–21,15-21 after a foot injury. In the 2024 Badminton Asia Championships, Lee was defeated by Jonatan Christie in the quarter-finals 21–11, 21–6.

Lee was crowned as champion at the 2024 Thailand Open after beating Ng Ka Long in the final 21–11, 21–10. In the 2024 Malaysia Masters, Lee went into his second final in a row but lost to top seed of the tournament Viktor Axelsen 6-21, 22–20, 13-21 due to a foot injury he sustained during the quarter-final against Anders Antonsen.

Lee conceded a walkover in the first round of the 2024 Singapore Open to Anthony Sinisuka Ginting from an injury he sustained from the 2024 Malaysia Masters. In the 2024 Indonesia Open, Lee was eliminated in the quarter-finals after losing to Kunlavut Vitidsarn of Thailand with a score of 16–21, 17–21.

Lee proved 2024 to be his breakthrough year after he broke his record of winning only a title in a year by taking the second one in the 2024 Australia Open, defeating Kodai Naraoka of Japan in rubber set of a score of 21–19, 11–21 and 21–18 in final.

At the 2024 Paris Summer Olympics, Lee took bronze after winning against India's Lakshya Sen. After losing 13-21 in the first game, Lee overcame a 5-point deficit to win 21-16 in the second game, and 21-11 in the decider to win the bronze medal match.

=== 2025: Injury, return and early exits ===
In the 2025 World Championships, Lee returned to tournament after a long break due to right ankle ligament injury that he sustained during the 2024 World Tour Finals, but had to exit at the first round after losing to Jeon Hyeok-jin of Korea.

Lee later competed at the Hong Kong Open, he was again defeated at the first round.

In the China Masters, Lee was forced to retire again after injuring at the first round.

== Awards and recognition ==
=== Awards ===
Year	Award	Category	Result
2024	The BrandLaureate Awards	ICON Sports Award	Won
2024	Anugerah Sukan Negara	National Sportsman of the Year	Nominated

=== Order ===
- Companion of the Ahli Cemerlang Semangat Jerai Kedah (ASK) (2021).

== Achievements ==
=== Olympic Games ===
Men's singles
Year	Venue	Opponent	Score	Result	Ref.
2024	Porte de La Chapelle Arena; Paris, France	(India) Lakshya Sen	13–21, 21–16, 21–11	Bronze	

=== Asian Championships ===
Men's singles
Year	Venue	Opponent	Score	Result	Ref.
2022	Muntinlupa Sports Complex; Metro Manila, Philippines	(Indonesia) Jonatan Christie	21–17, 23–21	Gold	

=== SEA Games ===
Men's singles
Year	Venue	Opponent	Score	Result	Ref.
2019	Muntinlupa Sports Complex; Metro Manila, Philippines	(Singapore) Loh Kean Yew	21–18, 21–18	Gold	

=== BWF World Junior Championships ===
Boys' singles
Year	Venue	Opponent	Score	Result
2016	Bilbao Arena; Bilbao, Spain	(Indonesia) Chico Aura Dwi Wardoyo	19–21, 18–21	Bronze

=== BWF World Tour (6 titles, 5 runners-up) ===
The BWF World Tour, which was announced on 19 March 2017 and implemented in 2018, is a series of elite badminton tournaments sanctioned by the Badminton World Federation (BWF). The BWF World Tour is divided into levels of World Tour Finals, Super 1000, Super 750, Super 500, Super 300, and the BWF Tour Super 100.

Men's singles
Year	Tournament	Level	Opponent	Score	Result	Ref.
2018	Chinese Taipei Open	Super 300	(Japan) Riichi Takeshita	21–17, 16–21, 21–11	(gold) Winner	
2018	Korea Masters	Super 300	(South Korea) Son Wan-ho	16–21, 11–21	(silver) Runner-up	
2021	All England Open	Super 1000	(Denmark) Viktor Axelsen	30–29, 20–22, 21–9	(gold) Winner	
2021	Hylo Open	Super 500	(Singapore) Loh Kean Yew	21–19, 13–21, 12–17^{r}	(silver) Runner-up	
2022	Thailand Open	Super 500	(China) Li Shifeng	17–21, 21–11, 23–21	(gold) Winner	
2022	Denmark Open	Super 750	(China) Shi Yuqi	18–21, 21–16, 12–21	(silver) Runner-up	
2023	Arctic Open	Super 500	(Malaysia) Ng Tze Yong	21–14, 21–15	(gold) Winner	
2023	Denmark Open	Super 750	(China) Weng Hongyang	12–21, 6–21	(silver) Runner-up	
2024	Thailand Open	Super 500	(Hong Kong) Ng Ka Long	21–11, 21–10	(gold) Winner	
2024	Malaysia Masters	Super 500	(Denmark) Viktor Axelsen	6–21, 22–20, 13–21	(silver) Runner-up	
2024	Australian Open	Super 500	(Japan) Kodai Naraoka	21–19, 11–21, 21–18	(gold) Winner	

=== BWF International Challenge/Series (1 title, 1 runner-up) ===
Men's singles
Year	Tournament	Opponent	Score	Result
2016	India International Series	(India) Lakshya Sen	13–11, 3–11, 6–11, 6–11	(silver) Runner-up
2017	Polish International Series	(Malaysia) Soong Joo Ven	21–17, 21–16	(gold) Winner

BWF International Challenge tournament
BWF International Series tournament

== Performance timeline ==
Key

W	Won	F	Finalist	SF	Semi-finalist
QF	Quarter-finalist	#R	Rounds 4, 3, 2, 1	RR	Round-robin stage
Q#	Qualification round	A	Absent	w/d	Withdrew
G	Gold	S	Silver	B	Bronze
NH	Not held	N/A	Not applicable	DNQ	Did not qualify

=== National team ===
- Junior level

Team events	2014	2015	2016
Asian Junior Championships	QF	QF	QF
World Junior Championships	6th	5th	S

- Senior level

Team events	2017	2018	2019	2020	2021	2022	2023	2024	2025	2026	Ref
SEA Games	S	NH	S	NH	A	NH	A	NH	A	NH	
Asia Team Championships	NH	B	NH	S	NH	G	NH	S	NH	A	
Asian Games	NH	1R	NH			1R	NH				
Thomas Cup	NH	QF	NH	QF	NH	QF	NH	B	NH	QF	
Sudirman Cup	QF	NH	QF	NH	B	NH	B	NH	A	NH	

=== Individual competitions ===
- Junior level

Events	2014	2015	2016
Asian Junior Championships	2R	3R	QF
World Junior Championships	2R	2R	B

- Senior level

Events	2017	2018	2019	2020	2021	2022	2023	2024	2025	Ref
SEA Games	2R	NH	G	NH	A	NH	A	NH	A	
Asian Championships	A			NH		G	1R	QF	A	
Asian Games	NH	3R	NH			QF	NH			
World Championships	A		QF	NH	QF	3R	3R	NH	1R	
Olympic Games	NH			2R	NH			B	NH	

Tournament	SS / GP	BWF World Tour									Best	Ref
Tournament	2017	2018	2019	2020	2021	2022	2023	2024	2025	2026	Best	Ref
Malaysia Open	A		1R	NH		2R	1R	1R	w/d	1R	2R ('22)	
India Open	A	1R	A	NH		A	2R	QF	A	1R	QF ('24)	
Indonesia Masters	NH	A	QF	1R	1R	QF	2R	QF	A	2R	QF ('19, '22, '24)	
Thailand Masters	SF	A	QF	2R	NH		A			QF	SF ('17)	
German Open	A		QF	NH		SF	2R	A			SF' ('22)	
All England Open	A			SF	W	SF	SF	QF	1R	A	W ('21)	
Swiss Open	A	1R	1R	NH	SF	A	SF	2R	w/d	1R	SF ('21, '23)	
Orléans Masters	2R	A		NH	A				QF	Q2	QF ('25)	
Thailand Open	A	2R	SF	QF	NH	W	A	W	A	1R	W ('22, '24)	
Thailand Open	A	2R	SF	1R	NH	W	A	W	A	1R	W ('22, '24)	
Malaysia Masters	1R	2R	QF	SF	NH	A	2R	F	A		F ('24)	
Singapore Open	A	1R	2R	NH		A	1R	w/d	A		2R ('19)	
Indonesia Open	A		QF	NH	1R	SF	1R	QF	A		SF ('22)	
Australian Open	A		1R	NH		2R	SF	W	A	1R	W ('24)	
Macau Open	A			NH				A		1R	1R ('26)	
U.S. Open	A			NH			A			2R	2R ('26)	
Canada Open	A			NH		A				SF	SF ('26)	
Japan Open	A		1R	NH		1R	1R	1R	A		1R ('19, '22, '23, '24)	
China Open	A		1R	NH			1R	1R	A		1R ('19, '23, '24)	
Taipei Open	SF	W	2R	NH		A				2R	W ('18)	
Korea Masters	A	F	A	NH		A				1R	F ('18)	
China Masters	A		2R	NH			QF	1R	1R	A	QF ('23)	
Vietnam Open	A			NH		A				2R	2R ('26)	
Arctic Open	N/A			NH			W	QF	A	SF	W ('23)	
Denmark Open	A		1R	A	QF	F	F	w/d	A		F ('22, '23)	
French Open	A		1R	NH	1R	1R	2R	1R	A		2R ('23)	
Hylo Open	SF	A			F	w/d	A			2R	F ('21)	
Korea Open	A		QF	NH		A	1R	A			QF ('19)	
Japan Masters	NH						1R	QF	A	Q2	QF ('24)	
Hong Kong Open	A			NH			2R	A	1R		2R ('23)	
BWF Superseries / Tour Finals	DNQ			RR	SF	DNQ		w/d	DNQ		SF ('21)	
New Zealand Open	2R	A	QF	NH							QF ('19)	
Year-end ranking	42	42	14	10	7	2	11	6	144		2	
Tournament	2017	2018	2019	2020	2021	2022	2023	2024	2025	2026	Best	Ref

== Record against selected opponents ==
Record against selected opponents. Accurate as of 25 August 2025.

Player	Matches	Win	Lost	Diff.
(China) Chen Long	5	2	3	–1
(China) Shi Yuqi	6	1	5	–4
(China) Li Shifeng	6	2	4	–2
(China) Lu Guangzu	7	5	2	+3
(China) Weng Hongyang	6	3	3	0
(Chinese Taipei) Chou Tien-chen	11	6	5	+1
(Denmark) Anders Antonsen	10	5	5	0
(Denmark) Viktor Axelsen	10	3	7	–4
(Denmark) Hans-Kristian Vittinghus	3	3	0	+3
(India) Lakshya Sen	7	2	5	–3
(India) Prannoy H. S.	3	1	2	–1
(India) Srikanth Kidambi	7	6	3	+3
(Indonesia) Anthony Sinisuka Ginting	6	1	5	–4
(Indonesia) Jonatan Christie	11	5	6	–1
(Indonesia) Chico Aura Dwi Wardoyo	6	5	1	+4
(Japan) Kento Momota	12	4	8	–4
(Japan) Kodai Naraoka	6	3	3	0
(Japan) Kenta Nishimoto	12	9	3	+6
(Singapore) Loh Kean Yew	8	6	2	+4
(South Korea) Jeon Hyeok-jin	5	3	2	+1
(South Korea) Son Wan-ho	2	0	2	–2
(Thailand) Kunlavut Vitidsarn	9	4	5	–1
(Thailand) Kantaphon Wangcharoen	7	4	3	+1
(Hong Kong) Ng Ka Long	11	6	5	+1
(Hong Kong) Lee Cheuk Yiu	4	2	2	0

Olympic Games
Preceded by Lee Chong Wei	Flagbearer for Malaysia (with Goh Liu Ying); Tokyo 2020	Succeeded by Bertrand Rhodict Lises; Nur Shazrin Mohd Latif
