= Dejan Ferdinansyah =

Indonesian badminton player (born 2000)

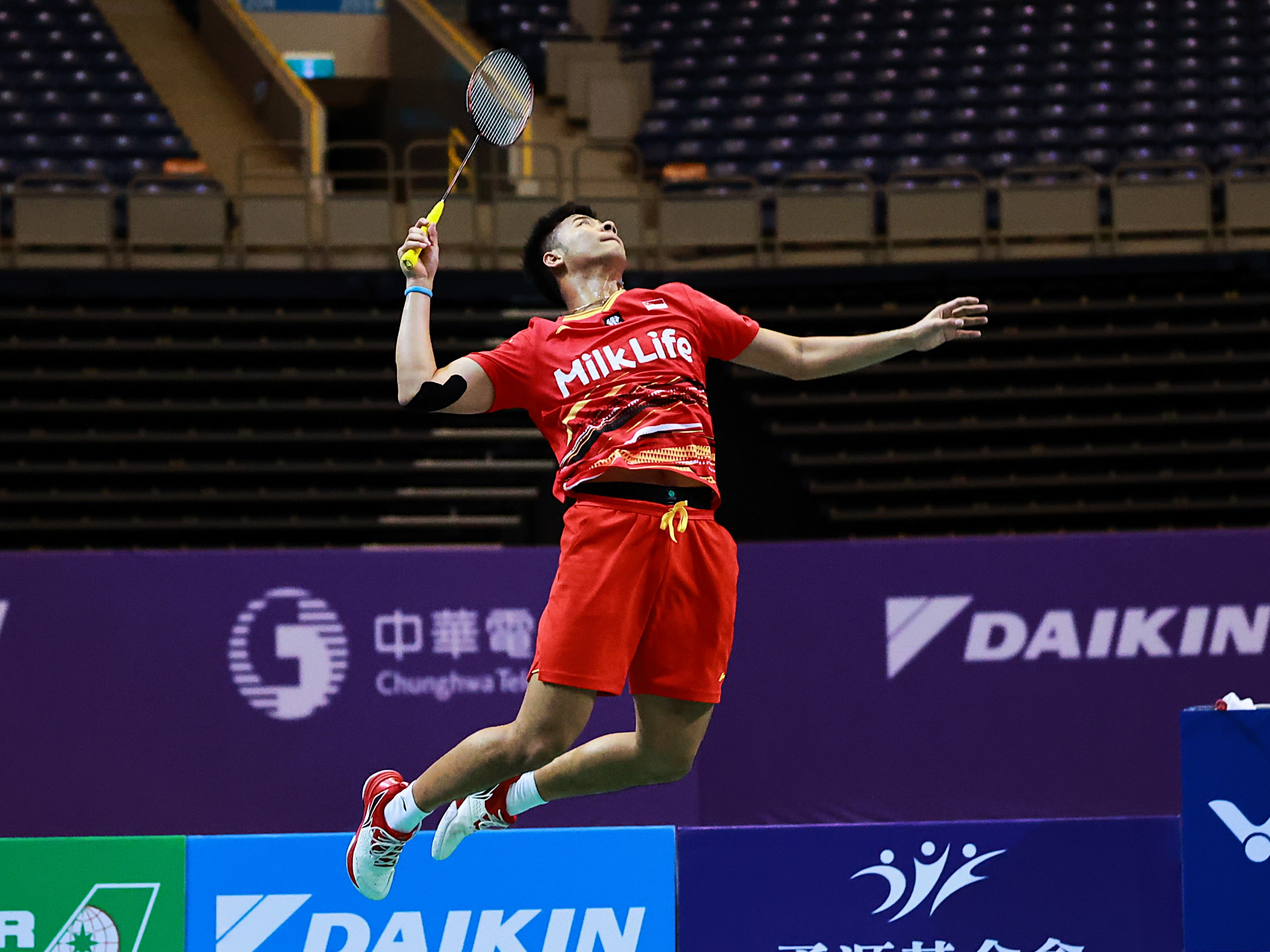
- Ferdinansyah at the 2025 Taipei Open

Personal information
- Born: 21 January 2000 (age 26) Garut, West Java, Indonesia
- Years active: 2017–present
- Height: 1.81 m (5 ft 11 in)
- Weight: 77 kg (170 lb)

Sport
- Country: Indonesia
- Sport: Badminton
- Handedness: Right

Mixed doubles
- Highest ranking: 8 (with Gloria Emanuelle Widjaja, 31 December 2024); 27 (with Siti Fadia Silva Ramadhanti, 1 July 2025); 28 (with Bernadine Wardana, 7 July 2026)
- Current ranking: 32 (with Bernadine Wardana, 18 August 2026)
- BWF profile
Medal record
Men's badminton
Representing Indonesia
Sudirman Cup
Bronze medal – third place	2025 Xiamen	Mixed team
Asian Championships
Bronze medal – third place	2023 Dubai	Mixed doubles
Asia Mixed Team Championships
Gold medal – first place	2025 Qingdao	Mixed team

Dejan Ferdinansyah (born 21 January 2000) is an Indonesian badminton player who is affiliated with the Djarum club. He gained public attention during his partnership with veteran player Gloria Emanuelle Widjaja in 2022–2024, which earned him a spot in the Indonesian national mixed doubles squad.

== Career ==
Ferdinansyah began training professionally in primary school under Bintang Badminton Club in Bogor. When the club dissolved following the owner's passing, he briefly joined PB Exist in Jakarta, but was released in 2018 as the club wanted to focus on junior players. Luckily, PB Djarum offered him a place in 2019. Paired with Serena Kani, he reached the final of the South Australia International. They also played at the 2020 Thailand Masters and the 2021 Spain Masters. Ferdinansyah and Kani became the sole Indonesian representative at the 2021 BWF World Championships after the Indonesian Badminton Federation withdrew all the national team players from the tournament.

=== 2022 ===
Ferdinansyah was selected to pair former national team player Gloria Emanuelle Widjaja following her return to PB Djarum. Making their debut at the All England Open, they lost to eventual winners Yuta Watanabe and Arisa Higashino in the second round. They also struggled at the Swiss Open and the Thailand Open.

Their performance began to pick up pace at the second half of the year, which saw them winning titles at the Denmark Masters, the Yogyakarta Indonesia International Series, the Vietnam Open, where they won over compatriots Rehan Naufal Kusharjanto/Lisa Ayu Kusumawati, and the Indonesia International Challenge in Malang. Although Jiang Zhenbang and Wei Yaxin put the pair's win streak to a pause at the Indonesia Masters Super 100, by this time, they had broken into the top 50. They also reached the semifinals of the Australian Open. Ferdinansyah and Widjaja closed off 2022 with a world rank of no. 20.

=== 2023 ===
Ferdinansyah and Widjaja saw mixed results at the start of the year, starting with a semifinal at the Malaysia Open followed by a second-round loss at the India Open and quarterfinal finishes at the Indonesia Masters and the Thailand Masters. Nevertheless, those were enough to bolster their rank to 15th at the end of January 2023.

Their run in Europe proved to be challenging, with early exits at the German Open, All England Open, and the Swiss Open. Surprisingly, they obtained a bronze medal at the Asian Championships in Dubai, notably defeating sixth seeds Feng Yanzhe and Huang Dongping at the first round.

Following their rising performance, Ferdinansyah and Widjaja was called up for the 2023 Sudirman Cup in Suzhou, China. The pair were only fielded once against Dechapol Puavaranukroh and Sapsiree Taerattanachai of Thailand and were unable to contribute points to the tie.

Their slump continued throughout the Malaysia Masters, Singapore Open, Indonesia Open, Korea Open, Japan Open, and Australian Open, as well at the World Championships. Fortunately, they bounced back as runner-ups at the Kaohsiung Masters. They closed off the year with a hard-fought first World Tour title at the Syed Modi International.

=== 2024 ===
Ferdinansyah and Widjaja reached the quarterfinals of the Thailand Masters, All England Open, Thailand Open, Malaysia Masters, and at the Indonesia Open. However, their semifinal finish at the China Open pulled them up to a world rank of no. 11, which was Ferdinansyah's career high. They later reached consecutive finals at the Macau Open and the Korea Masters. Despite failing to qualify for the 2024 Paris Olympics, they were able to qualify for the World Tour Finals, marking Ferdinansyah's first appearance at the year-end tournament. They finished third in Group B with two losses and one win.

=== 2025 ===
Ferdinansyah concluded his partnership with Widjaja at the Malaysia Open to move into the national team. He commenced his new journey in a highly expected partnership with Siti Fadia Silva Ramadhanti. They started out at the India Open, where they lost to Jiang Zhenbang/Wei Yaxin at the second round. Later, they became runner-ups at the Thailand Masters to home pair Dechapol Puavaranukroh/Supissara Paewsampran. Ferdinansyah played with Ramadhanti at the Asia Mixed Team Championships and earned a gold medal with the team despite being absent in the final due to a knee injury. He was called up to his second Sudirman Cup but only played against Korea's Seo Seung-jae/Chae Yu-jung. After that, he finished second at the Taipei Open to juniors Jafar Hidayatullah/Felisha Pasaribu.

With Ramadhanti returning to women's doubles, Ferdinansyah was paired with new recruit Bernadine Wardana. In their first four months, they snatched titles at the Al Ain Masters and the Syed Modi International Super 300, as well as becoming runner-ups at the Malaysia Masters Super 100 and the Odisha Masters.

== Achievements ==
=== Asian Championships ===
Mixed doubles
Year	Venue	Partner	Opponent	Score	Result	Ref.
2023	Sheikh Rashid Bin Hamdan Indoor Hall; Dubai, United Arab Emirates	(Indonesia) Gloria Emanuelle Widjaja	(China) Jiang Zhenbang (China) Wei Yaxin	17–21, 15–21	Bronze	

=== BWF World Tour (4 titles, 7 runners-up) ===
The BWF World Tour, which was announced on 19 March 2017 and implemented in 2018, is a series of elite badminton tournaments sanctioned by the Badminton World Federation (BWF). The BWF World Tour is divided into levels of World Tour Finals, Super 1000, Super 750, Super 500, Super 300, and the BWF Tour Super 100.

Mixed doubles
Year	Tournament	Level	Partner	Opponent	Score	Result	Ref.
2022	Vietnam Open	Super 100	(Indonesia) Gloria Emanuelle Widjaja	(Indonesia) Rehan Naufal Kusharjanto (Indonesia) Lisa Ayu Kusumawati	21–13, 21–18	(gold) Winner	
2023	Kaohsiung Masters	Super 100	(Indonesia) Gloria Emanuelle Widjaja	(Japan) Hiroki Nishi (Japan) Akari Sato	20–22, 21–12, 14–21	(silver) Runner-up	
2023	Syed Modi International	Super 300	(Indonesia) Gloria Emanuelle Widjaja	(Japan) Yuki Kaneko (Japan) Misaki Matsutomo	20–22, 21–19, 25–23	(gold) Winner	
2024	Macau Open	Super 300	(Indonesia) Gloria Emanuelle Widjaja	(China) Guo Xinwa (China) Chen Fanghui	15–21, 18–21	(silver) Runner-up	
2024	Korea Masters	Super 300	(Indonesia) Gloria Emanuelle Widjaja	(China) Guo Xinwa (China) Chen Fanghui	10–21, 12–21	(silver) Runner-up	
2025	Thailand Masters	Super 300	(Indonesia) Siti Fadia Silva Ramadhanti	(Thailand) Dechapol Puavaranukroh (Thailand) Supissara Paewsampran	21–19, 17–21, 13–21	(silver) Runner-up	
2025	Taipei Open	Super 300	(Indonesia) Siti Fadia Silva Ramadhanti	(Indonesia) Jafar Hidayatullah (Indonesia) Felisha Pasaribu	21–18, 13–21, 17–21	(silver) Runner-up	
2025	Al Ain Masters	Super 100	(Indonesia) Bernadine Wardana	(Indonesia) Marwan Faza (Indonesia) Aisyah Pranata	21–12, 21–16	(gold) Winner	
2025	Malaysia Super 100	Super 100	(Indonesia) Bernadine Wardana	(Japan) Yuta Watanabe (Japan) Maya Taguchi	18–21, 12–21	(silver) Runner-up	
2025	Syed Modi International	Super 300	(Indonesia) Bernadine Wardana	(Thailand) Pakkapon Teeraratsakul (Thailand) Sapsiree Taerattanachai	21–19, 21–16	(gold) Winner	
2025	Odisha Masters	Super 100	(Indonesia) Bernadine Wardana	(Indonesia) Marwan Faza (Indonesia) Aisyah Pranata	15–21, 10–21	(silver) Runner-up	

=== BWF International Challenge/Series (4 titles, 1 runner-up) ===
Mixed doubles
Year	Tournament	Partner	Opponent	Score	Result	Ref.
2019	South Australia International	(Indonesia) Serena Kani	(Canada) Joshua Hurlburt-Yu (Canada) Josephine Wu	19–21, 27–25, 16–21	(silver) Runner-up	
2022	Denmark Masters	(Indonesia) Gloria Emanuelle Widjaja	(Hong Kong) Lee Chun Hei (Hong Kong) Ng Tsz Yau	21–16, 21–19	(gold) Winner	
2022	Indonesia International	(Indonesia) Gloria Emanuelle Widjaja	(Indonesia) Muhammad Reza Pahlevi Isfahani (Indonesia) Melati Daeva Oktavianti	19–21, 21–9, 23–21	(gold) Winner	
2022 (II)	Indonesia International	(Indonesia) Gloria Emanuelle Widjaja	(China) Jiang Zhenbang (China) Wei Yaxin	21–18, 22–20	(gold) Winner	
2026 (I)	Indonesia International	(Indonesia) Apriyani Rahayu	(Chinese Taipei) Lin Sheng-ming (Chinese Taipei) Liang Ching-sun	19–21, 27–25, 21–19	(gold) Winner	

BWF International Challenge tournament
BWF Future Series tournament

== Performance timeline ==
Key

W	Won	F	Finalist	SF	Semi-finalist
QF	Quarter-finalist	#R	Rounds 4, 3, 2, 1	RR	Round-robin stage
Q#	Qualification round	A	Absent	w/d	Withdrew
G	Gold	S	Silver	B	Bronze
NH	Not held	N/A	Not applicable	DNQ	Did not qualify

=== National team ===
- Senior level

Team events	2023	2024	2025	Ref
Asia Mixed Team Championships	A	NH	G	
Sudirman Cup	QF	NH	B	

=== Individual competitions ===
==== Senior level ====
===== Men's doubles =====
Tournament	BWF World Tour	Best
Tournament	2019	Best
Indonesia Masters Super 100	1R	1R ('19)
Year-end ranking	319	309

===== Mixed doubles =====
Events	2021	2022	2023	2024	2025	Ref
Asia Championships	NH	A	B	2R	1R	
World Championships	2R	A	3R	NH	No	

Tournament	BWF World Tour								Best	Ref
Tournament	2019	2020	2021	2022	2023	2024	2025	2026	Best	Ref
Malaysia Open	A	NH		A	SF	2R	2R	A	SF ('23)	
India Open	A	NH		A	2R	1R	2R	A	2R ('23, '25)	
Indonesia Masters	A				QF	1R	1R	2R	QF ('23)	
Thailand Masters	A	2R	NH		QF	QF	F	1R	F ('25)	
German Open	A	NH		A	2R	1R	A		2R ('23)	
All England Open	A			2R	1R	QF	A		QF ('24)	
Swiss Open	A	NH	A	1R	1R	2R	1R	1R	2R ('24)	
Orléans Masters	A	NH	A					2R	2R ('26)	
Thailand Open	A		NH	2R	A	QF	1R	2R	QF ('24)	
Malaysia Masters	A		NH	A	2R	QF	QF	1R	QF ('24, '25)	
Singapore Open	A	NH		A	1R	2R	A		2R ('24)	
Indonesia Open	A	NH	A		1R	QF	1R	1R	QF ('24)	
Australian Open	A	NH		SF	1R	A			SF ('22)	
Macau Open	A	NH				F	A		F ('24)	
Canada Open	A	NH		A		1R	A		1R ('24)	
Japan Open	A	NH		A	2R	1R	A		2R ('23)	
China Open	A	NH			2R	SF	A		SF ('24)	
Taipei Open	A	NH		A			F	1R	F ('25)	
Korea Masters	A	NH		A		F	A		F ('24)	
China Masters	A	NH			2R	QF	A		QF ('24)	
Indonesia Masters Super 100	2R	NH		SF	A		1R	SF	SF ('22, '26 I)	
Indonesia Masters Super 100	2R	NH		SF	A		1R	A	SF ('22, '26 I)	
Vietnam Open	A	NH		W	A		2R	A	W ('22)	
Al Ain Masters	NH				A	NH	W	NH	W ('25)	
Arctic Open	N/A	NH			2R	A			2R ('23)	
Denmark Open	A				2R	A		1R	2R ('23)	
Malaysia Super 100	NH				A		F	A	F ('25)	
French Open	A	NH	A		2R	2R	A	1R	2R ('23, '24)	
Hylo Open	A				QF	A		2R	QF ('23)	
Korea Open	A	NH		A	2R	1R	A		2R ('23)	
Japan Masters	NH				A	1R	A	1R	1R ('24, '26)	
Kaohsiung Masters	NH				F	A			F ('23)	
Hong Kong Open	A	NH			1R	1R	A	Q	1R ('23, '24)	
Syed Modi International	A	NH		A	W	A	W	A	W ('23, '25)	
Guwahati Masters	NH				QF	A	QF	A	QF ('23, '25)	
Odisha Masters	NH			A			F	A	F ('25)	
World Tour Finals	DNQ					RR	DNQ		RR ('24)	
Spain Masters	A		QF	NH	A	1R	NH		QF ('21)	
Year-end ranking	118	96	79	20	14	8	31		8	
Tournament	2019	2020	2021	2022	2023	2024	2025	2026	Best	Ref
