= East Asian Judo Championships =

Judo competition

East Asian Judo Championships is the Judo East Asian Championship organized by the Judo Union of Asia.

The tournament began in 2006 and was held every year, except in the years when the East Asian Games have been held.

== List Tournaments ==
Year	Date	City and host country	Venue	# Countries	# Athletes	competition		Ref.
Year	Date	City and host country	Venue	# Countries	# Athletes	♂	♀	Ref.
2006	2–3 September	Ulaanbaatar, Mongolia	Bökhiin Örgöö	8 (Note: Japan, South Korea, China, Mongolia, Taiwan, Hong Kong, Macau and North Korea)		●	●	
2007	30–31 October	Shenzhen, China	Luohu Gymnasium	8 (Note: Japan, South Korea, China, Mongolia, Taiwan, Hong Kong, Macau and Guam)		●	●	
2008	20–21 September	Taipei, Taiwan	Taiwan Police College			●	●	
2009	12–13 December	(China) Hong Kong, Hong Kong		9				
2010	19–20 June	Macau, China	Tap Seac Multi-sports Pavilion			●	●	
2011	25–26 June	Hong Kong, China	Ma On Shan Sports Centre			●	●	
2012	19–20 May	Gochang, South Korea				●	●	
2013	6–15 October	Tianjin, China						
2014	9–10 May	Ulaanbaatar, Mongolia		9 (Note: Japan, South Korea, China, Mongolia, Taiwan, Hong Kong, Macau, Guam and North Korea)		●	●	
2015		Nagoya, Japan						
2016		(China) Hong Kong, Hong Kong						
2017		Qujing, China						
2018		Ulaanbaatar, Mongolia						

East Asian Games

== All-time medal table ==
Rank	Nation	Gold	Silver	Bronze	Total
1	Mongolia	6	5	22	33
2	Japan	5	7	23	35
Totals (2 entries)		11	12	45	68
