= 2018 BWF World Tour =

2018 badminton season

Tournament details
- Dates: 9 January – 16 December
- Edition: 1st

The 2018 BWF World Tour, officially known as the 2018 HSBC BWF World Tour for sponsorship reasons, was the first season of the BWF World Tour of badminton, a circuit of 26 tournaments which led up to the World Tour Finals tournament. It replaced the BWF Super Series and BWF Grand Prix, which was held from 2007 to 2017.

The tour included 27 tournaments, divided into five levels: Level 1 was the World Tour Finals, Level 2 was Super 1000 (three tournaments), Level 3 was Super 750 (five tournaments), Level 4 was Super 500 (seven tournaments), and Level 5 was Super 300 (11 tournaments). Each tournament offered different ranking points and prize money. The highest points and the largest prize pool were offered at the Super 1000 level, including the World Tour Finals.

One other category of tournament, the BWF Tour Super 100 (level 6), also offered BWF World Tour ranking points. BWF Tour Super 100 was an important part of the pathway and entry point for players into the BWF World Tour tournaments. When the 11 Level 6 grade tournaments of the BWF Tour Super 100 were included, the complete tour consisted of 38 tournaments.

== Results ==
Below is the schedule released by the Badminton World Federation:

=== Key ===
World Tour Finals
Super 1000
Super 750
Super 500
Super 300
Super 100

=== Winners ===
Tour	Report	Men's singles	Women's singles	Men's doubles	Women's doubles	Mixed doubles
World Tour Finals
BWF World Tour Finals	Report	(China) Shi Yuqi	(India) P. V. Sindhu	(China) Li Junhui (China) Liu Yuchen	(Japan) Misaki Matsutomo (Japan) Ayaka Takahashi	(China) Wang Yilyu (China) Huang Dongping
Super 1000
All England Open	Report	(China) Shi Yuqi	(Chinese Taipei) Tai Tzu-ying	(Indonesia) Marcus Fernaldi Gideon (Indonesia) Kevin Sanjaya Sukamuljo	(Denmark) Kamilla Rytter Juhl (Denmark) Christinna Pedersen	(Japan) Yuta Watanabe (Japan) Arisa Higashino
Indonesia Open	Report	(Japan) Kento Momota	(Chinese Taipei) Tai Tzu-ying	(Indonesia) Marcus Fernaldi Gideon (Indonesia) Kevin Sanjaya Sukamuljo	(Japan) Yuki Fukushima (Japan) Sayaka Hirota	(Indonesia) Tontowi Ahmad (Indonesia) Liliyana Natsir
China Open	Report	(Indonesia) Anthony Sinisuka Ginting	(Spain) Carolina Marín	(Denmark) Kim Astrup (Denmark) Anders Skaarup Rasmussen	(Japan) Misaki Matsutomo (Japan) Ayaka Takahashi	(China) Zheng Siwei (China) Huang Yaqiong
Super 750
Malaysia Open	Report	(Malaysia) Lee Chong Wei	(Chinese Taipei) Tai Tzu-ying	(Japan) Takeshi Kamura (Japan) Keigo Sonoda	(Japan) Misaki Matsutomo (Japan) Ayaka Takahashi	(China) Zheng Siwei (China) Huang Yaqiong
Japan Open	Report	(Japan) Kento Momota	(Spain) Carolina Marín	(Indonesia) Marcus Fernaldi Gideon (Indonesia) Kevin Sanjaya Sukamuljo	(Japan) Yuki Fukushima (Japan) Sayaka Hirota	(China) Zheng Siwei (China) Huang Yaqiong
Denmark Open	Report	(Japan) Kento Momota	(Chinese Taipei) Tai Tzu-ying	(Indonesia) Marcus Fernaldi Gideon (Indonesia) Kevin Sanjaya Sukamuljo	(Japan) Yuki Fukushima (Japan) Sayaka Hirota	(China) Zheng Siwei (China) Huang Yaqiong
French Open	Report	(China) Chen Long	(Japan) Akane Yamaguchi	(China) Han Chengkai (China) Zhou Haodong	(Japan) Mayu Matsumoto (Japan) Wakana Nagahara	(China) Zheng Siwei (China) Huang Yaqiong
Fuzhou China Open	Report	(Japan) Kento Momota	(China) Chen Yufei	(Indonesia) Marcus Fernaldi Gideon (Indonesia) Kevin Sanjaya Sukamuljo	(South Korea) Lee So-hee (South Korea) Shin Seung-chan	(China) Zheng Siwei (China) Huang Yaqiong
Super 500
Malaysia Masters	Report	(Denmark) Viktor Axelsen	(Thailand) Ratchanok Intanon	(Indonesia) Fajar Alfian (Indonesia) M. Rian Ardianto	(Denmark) Kamilla Rytter Juhl (Denmark) Christinna Pedersen	(Hong Kong) Tang Chun Man (Hong Kong) Tse Ying Suet
Indonesia Masters	Report	(Indonesia) Anthony Sinisuka Ginting	(Chinese Taipei) Tai Tzu-ying	(Indonesia) Marcus Fernaldi Gideon (Indonesia) Kevin Sanjaya Sukamuljo	(Japan) Misaki Matsutomo (Japan) Ayaka Takahashi	(China) Zheng Siwei (China) Huang Yaqiong
India Open	Report	(China) Shi Yuqi	(United States) Beiwen Zhang	(Indonesia) Marcus Fernaldi Gideon (Indonesia) Kevin Sanjaya Sukamuljo	(Indonesia) Greysia Polii (Indonesia) Apriyani Rahayu	(Denmark) Mathias Christiansen (Denmark) Christinna Pedersen
Thailand Open	Report	(Japan) Kanta Tsuneyama	(Japan) Nozomi Okuhara	(Japan) Takeshi Kamura (Japan) Keigo Sonoda	(Indonesia) Greysia Polii (Indonesia) Apriyani Rahayu	(Indonesia) Hafiz Faizal (Indonesia) Gloria Emanuelle Widjaja
Singapore Open	Report	(Chinese Taipei) Chou Tien-chen	(Japan) Sayaka Takahashi	(Indonesia) Mohammad Ahsan (Indonesia) Hendra Setiawan	(Japan) Ayako Sakuramoto (Japan) Yukiko Takahata	(Malaysia) Goh Soon Huat (Malaysia) Shevon Jemie Lai
Korea Open	Report	(Chinese Taipei) Chou Tien-chen	(Japan) Nozomi Okuhara	(Japan) Hiroyuki Endo (Japan) Yuta Watanabe	(Japan) Misaki Matsutomo (Japan) Ayaka Takahashi	(China) He Jiting (China) Du Yue
Hong Kong Open	Report	(South Korea) Son Wan-ho	(Japan) Nozomi Okuhara	(Indonesia) Marcus Fernaldi Gideon (Indonesia) Kevin Sanjaya Sukamuljo	(Japan) Yuki Fukushima (Japan) Sayaka Hirota	(Japan) Yuta Watanabe (Japan) Arisa Higashino
Super 300
Thailand Masters	Report	(Indonesia) Tommy Sugiarto	(Thailand) Nitchaon Jindapol	(Thailand) Tinn Isriyanet (Thailand) Kittisak Namdash	(Thailand) Jongkolphan Kititharakul (Thailand) Rawinda Prajongjai	(Malaysia) Chan Peng Soon (Malaysia) Goh Liu Ying
Swiss Open	Report	(India) Sameer Verma	(Japan) Sayaka Takahashi	(Denmark) Mathias Boe (Denmark) Carsten Mogensen	(Japan) Ayako Sakuramoto (Japan) Yukiko Takahata	(Germany) Mark Lamsfuß (Germany) Isabel Herttrich
German Open	Report	(Chinese Taipei) Chou Tien-chen	(Japan) Akane Yamaguchi	(Japan) Takuto Inoue (Japan) Yuki Kaneko	(Japan) Yuki Fukushima (Japan) Sayaka Hirota	(Malaysia) Goh Soon Huat (Malaysia) Shevon Jemie Lai
New Zealand Open	Report	(China) Lin Dan	(Japan) Sayaka Takahashi	(Chinese Taipei) Chen Hung-ling (Chinese Taipei) Wang Chi-lin	(Japan) Ayako Sakuramoto (Japan) Yukiko Takahata	(Chinese Taipei) Wang Chi-lin (Chinese Taipei) Lee Chia-hsin
Australian Open	Report	(China) Lu Guangzu	(China) Cai Yanyan	(Indonesia) Berry Angriawan (Indonesia) Hardianto	(Japan) Ayako Sakuramoto (Japan) Yukiko Takahata	(South Korea) Seo Seung-jae (South Korea) Chae Yoo-jung
U.S. Open	Report	(South Korea) Lee Dong-keun	(China) Li Xuerui	(China) Ou Xuanyi (China) Ren Xiangyu	(China) Tang Jinhua (China) Yu Xiaohan	(Malaysia) Chan Peng Soon (Malaysia) Goh Liu Ying
Spain Masters	Report	(Denmark) Rasmus Gemke	(Japan) Minatsu Mitani	(South Korea) Kim Gi-jung (South Korea) Lee Yong-dae	(Japan) Mayu Matsumoto (Japan) Wakana Nagahara	(Denmark) Niclas Nøhr (Denmark) Sara Thygesen
Chinese Taipei Open	Report	(Malaysia) Lee Zii Jia	(Chinese Taipei) Tai Tzu-ying	(Chinese Taipei) Chen Hung-ling (Chinese Taipei) Wang Chi-lin	(Japan) Nami Matsuyama (Japan) Chiharu Shida	(Indonesia) Alfian Eko Prasetya (Indonesia) Marsheilla Gischa Islami
Macau Open	Report	(South Korea) Lee Hyun-il	(Canada) Michelle Li	(South Korea) Kim Gi-jung (South Korea) Lee Yong-dae	(Malaysia) Vivian Hoo (Malaysia) Yap Cheng Wen	(Hong Kong) Tang Chun Man (Hong Kong) Tse Ying Suet
Syed Modi International	Report	(India) Sameer Verma	(China) Han Yue	(Indonesia) Fajar Alfian (Indonesia) M. Rian Ardianto	(Malaysia) Chow Mei Kuan (Malaysia) Lee Meng Yean	(China) Ou Xuanyi (China) Feng Xueying
Korea Masters	Report	(South Korea) Son Wan-ho	(China) Li Xuerui	(South Korea) Choi Sol-gyu (South Korea) Seo Seung-jae	(South Korea) Chang Ye-na (South Korea) Jung Kyung-eun	(South Korea) Ko Sung-hyun (South Korea) Eom Hye-won
Super 100
Orléans Masters	Report	(Netherlands) Mark Caljouw	(Japan) Shiori Saito	(Germany) Mark Lamsfuß (Germany) Marvin Emil Seidel	(Bulgaria) Gabriela Stoeva (Bulgaria) Stefani Stoeva	(Denmark) Niclas Nøhr (Denmark) Sara Thygesen
Lingshui China Masters	Report	(Chinese Taipei) Lin Yu-hsien	(China) Li Xuerui	(China) Han Chengkai (China) Zhou Haodong	(China) Du Yue (China) Li Yinhui	(China) Guo Xinwa (China) Liu Xuanxuan
Canada Open	Report	(China) Lu Guangzu	(China) Li Xuerui	(England) Marcus Ellis (England) Chris Langridge	(Japan) Ayako Sakuramoto (Japan) Yukiko Takahata	(England) Marcus Ellis (England) Lauren Smith
Akita Masters	Report	(Thailand) Sitthikom Thammasin	(Japan) Sayaka Takahashi	(Indonesia) Akbar Bintang Cahyono (Indonesia) Muhammad Reza Pahlevi Isfahani	(Japan) Ayako Sakuramoto (Japan) Yukiko Takahata	(Japan) Kohei Gondo (Japan) Ayane Kurihara
Russian Open	Report	(India) Sourabh Verma	(Malaysia) Ho Yen Mei	(Malaysia) Mohamad Arif Abdul Latif (Malaysia) Nur Mohd Azriyn Ayub	(Japan) Chisato Hoshi (Japan) Kie Nakanishi	(Russia) Vladimir Ivanov (South Korea) Kim Min-kyung
Vietnam Open	Report	(Indonesia) Shesar Hiren Rhustavito	(Singapore) Yeo Jia Min	(South Korea) Ko Sung-hyun (South Korea) Shin Baek-cheol	(Japan) Misato Aratama (Japan) Akane Watanabe	(Thailand) Nipitphon Phuangphuapet (Thailand) Savitree Amitrapai
Hyderabad Open	Report	(India) Sameer Verma	(South Korea) Kim Ga-eun	(India) Satwiksairaj Rankireddy (India) Chirag Shetty	(Hong Kong) Ng Tsz Yau (Hong Kong) Yuen Sin Ying	(Indonesia) Akbar Bintang Cahyono (Indonesia) Winny Oktavina Kandow
Bangka Belitung Indonesia Masters	Report	(Indonesia) Ihsan Maulana Mustofa	(Japan) Minatsu Mitani	(Chinese Taipei) Chang Ko-chi (Chinese Taipei) Lu Chia-pin	(Japan) Ayako Sakuramoto (Japan) Yukiko Takahata	(Indonesia) Rinov Rivaldy (Indonesia) Pitha Haningtyas Mentari
Dutch Open	Report	(India) Sourabh Verma	(Denmark) Mia Blichfeldt	(Indonesia) Wahyu Nayaka Arya Pankaryanira (Indonesia) Ade Yusuf Santoso	(Bulgaria) Gabriela Stoeva (Bulgaria) Stefani Stoeva	(England) Marcus Ellis (England) Lauren Smith
SaarLorLux Open	Report	(India) Subhankar Dey	(China) Cai Yanyan	(England) Marcus Ellis (England) Chris Langridge	(Bulgaria) Gabriela Stoeva (Bulgaria) Stefani Stoeva	(England) Marcus Ellis (England) Lauren Smith
Scottish Open	Report	(China) Liu Haichao	(Scotland) Kirsty Gilmour	(England) Marcus Ellis (England) Chris Langridge	(Bulgaria) Gabriela Stoeva (Bulgaria) Stefani Stoeva	(England) Marcus Ellis (England) Lauren Smith

== Finals ==
=== January ===
Date	Tournament	Champions	Runners-up
9–14 January	Thailand Masters (Report): Host: Bangkok, Thailand; Venue: Nimibutr Stadium; Level: Super 300; Prize: $150,000; Format: 32MS/32WS/32MD/32WD/32XD	(Indonesia) Tommy Sugiarto	(Malaysia) Leong Jun Hao
9–14 January	Thailand Masters (Report): Host: Bangkok, Thailand; Venue: Nimibutr Stadium; Level: Super 300; Prize: $150,000; Format: 32MS/32WS/32MD/32WD/32XD	Score: 21–16, 21–15	
9–14 January	Thailand Masters (Report): Host: Bangkok, Thailand; Venue: Nimibutr Stadium; Level: Super 300; Prize: $150,000; Format: 32MS/32WS/32MD/32WD/32XD	(Thailand) Nitchaon Jindapol	(Thailand) Pornpawee Chochuwong
9–14 January	Thailand Masters (Report): Host: Bangkok, Thailand; Venue: Nimibutr Stadium; Level: Super 300; Prize: $150,000; Format: 32MS/32WS/32MD/32WD/32XD	Score: 21–11, 21–18	
9–14 January	Thailand Masters (Report): Host: Bangkok, Thailand; Venue: Nimibutr Stadium; Level: Super 300; Prize: $150,000; Format: 32MS/32WS/32MD/32WD/32XD	(Thailand) Tinn Isriyanet (Thailand) Kittisak Namdash	(Indonesia) Wahyu Nayaka Arya Pankaryanira (Indonesia) Ade Yusuf Santoso
9–14 January	Thailand Masters (Report): Host: Bangkok, Thailand; Venue: Nimibutr Stadium; Level: Super 300; Prize: $150,000; Format: 32MS/32WS/32MD/32WD/32XD	Score: 21–18, 11–21, 22–20	
9–14 January	Thailand Masters (Report): Host: Bangkok, Thailand; Venue: Nimibutr Stadium; Level: Super 300; Prize: $150,000; Format: 32MS/32WS/32MD/32WD/32XD	(Thailand) Jongkolphan Kititharakul (Thailand) Rawinda Prajongjai	(Indonesia) Anggia Shitta Awanda (Indonesia) Ni Ketut Mahadewi Istarani
9–14 January	Thailand Masters (Report): Host: Bangkok, Thailand; Venue: Nimibutr Stadium; Level: Super 300; Prize: $150,000; Format: 32MS/32WS/32MD/32WD/32XD	Score: 21–19, 21–17	
9–14 January	Thailand Masters (Report): Host: Bangkok, Thailand; Venue: Nimibutr Stadium; Level: Super 300; Prize: $150,000; Format: 32MS/32WS/32MD/32WD/32XD	(Malaysia) Chan Peng Soon (Malaysia) Goh Liu Ying	(Thailand) Dechapol Puavaranukroh (Thailand) Puttita Supajirakul
9–14 January	Thailand Masters (Report): Host: Bangkok, Thailand; Venue: Nimibutr Stadium; Level: Super 300; Prize: $150,000; Format: 32MS/32WS/32MD/32WD/32XD	Score: 21–15, 14–21, 21–16	
16–21 January	Malaysia Masters (Report): Host: Kuala Lumpur, Malaysia; Venue: Axiata Arena; Level: Super 500; Prize: $350,000; Format: 32MS/32WS/32MD/32WD/32XD	(Denmark) Viktor Axelsen	(Japan) Kenta Nishimoto
16–21 January	Malaysia Masters (Report): Host: Kuala Lumpur, Malaysia; Venue: Axiata Arena; Level: Super 500; Prize: $350,000; Format: 32MS/32WS/32MD/32WD/32XD	Score: 21–13, 21–23, 21–18	
16–21 January	Malaysia Masters (Report): Host: Kuala Lumpur, Malaysia; Venue: Axiata Arena; Level: Super 500; Prize: $350,000; Format: 32MS/32WS/32MD/32WD/32XD	(Thailand) Ratchanok Intanon	(Chinese Taipei) Tai Tzu-ying
16–21 January	Malaysia Masters (Report): Host: Kuala Lumpur, Malaysia; Venue: Axiata Arena; Level: Super 500; Prize: $350,000; Format: 32MS/32WS/32MD/32WD/32XD	Score: 21–16, 14–21, 24–22	
16–21 January	Malaysia Masters (Report): Host: Kuala Lumpur, Malaysia; Venue: Axiata Arena; Level: Super 500; Prize: $350,000; Format: 32MS/32WS/32MD/32WD/32XD	(Indonesia) Fajar Alfian (Indonesia) Muhammad Rian Ardianto	(Malaysia) Goh V Shem (Malaysia) Tan Wee Kiong
16–21 January	Malaysia Masters (Report): Host: Kuala Lumpur, Malaysia; Venue: Axiata Arena; Level: Super 500; Prize: $350,000; Format: 32MS/32WS/32MD/32WD/32XD	Score: 14–21, 24–22, 21–13	
16–21 January	Malaysia Masters (Report): Host: Kuala Lumpur, Malaysia; Venue: Axiata Arena; Level: Super 500; Prize: $350,000; Format: 32MS/32WS/32MD/32WD/32XD	(Denmark) Kamilla Rytter Juhl (Denmark) Christinna Pedersen	(China) Chen Qingchen (China) Jia Yifan
16–21 January	Malaysia Masters (Report): Host: Kuala Lumpur, Malaysia; Venue: Axiata Arena; Level: Super 500; Prize: $350,000; Format: 32MS/32WS/32MD/32WD/32XD	Score: 22–20, 21–18	
16–21 January	Malaysia Masters (Report): Host: Kuala Lumpur, Malaysia; Venue: Axiata Arena; Level: Super 500; Prize: $350,000; Format: 32MS/32WS/32MD/32WD/32XD	(Hong Kong) Tang Chun Man (Hong Kong) Tse Ying Suet	(China) Zheng Siwei (China) Huang Yaqiong
16–21 January	Malaysia Masters (Report): Host: Kuala Lumpur, Malaysia; Venue: Axiata Arena; Level: Super 500; Prize: $350,000; Format: 32MS/32WS/32MD/32WD/32XD	Score: 19–21, 22–20, 21–18	
23–28 January	Indonesia Masters (Report): Host: Jakarta, Indonesia; Venue: Istora Gelora Bung Karno; Level: Super 500; Prize: $350,000; Format: 32MS/32WS/32MD/32WD/32XD	(Indonesia) Anthony Sinisuka Ginting	(Japan) Kazumasa Sakai
23–28 January	Indonesia Masters (Report): Host: Jakarta, Indonesia; Venue: Istora Gelora Bung Karno; Level: Super 500; Prize: $350,000; Format: 32MS/32WS/32MD/32WD/32XD	Score: 21–13, 21–12	
23–28 January	Indonesia Masters (Report): Host: Jakarta, Indonesia; Venue: Istora Gelora Bung Karno; Level: Super 500; Prize: $350,000; Format: 32MS/32WS/32MD/32WD/32XD	(Chinese Taipei) Tai Tzu-ying	(India) Saina Nehwal
23–28 January	Indonesia Masters (Report): Host: Jakarta, Indonesia; Venue: Istora Gelora Bung Karno; Level: Super 500; Prize: $350,000; Format: 32MS/32WS/32MD/32WD/32XD	Score: 21–9, 21–13	
23–28 January	Indonesia Masters (Report): Host: Jakarta, Indonesia; Venue: Istora Gelora Bung Karno; Level: Super 500; Prize: $350,000; Format: 32MS/32WS/32MD/32WD/32XD	(Indonesia) Marcus Fernaldi Gideon (Indonesia) Kevin Sanjaya Sukamuljo	(China) Li Junhui (China) Liu Yuchen
23–28 January	Indonesia Masters (Report): Host: Jakarta, Indonesia; Venue: Istora Gelora Bung Karno; Level: Super 500; Prize: $350,000; Format: 32MS/32WS/32MD/32WD/32XD	Score: 11–21, 21–10, 21–16	
23–28 January	Indonesia Masters (Report): Host: Jakarta, Indonesia; Venue: Istora Gelora Bung Karno; Level: Super 500; Prize: $350,000; Format: 32MS/32WS/32MD/32WD/32XD	(Japan) Misaki Matsutomo (Japan) Ayaka Takahashi	(Indonesia) Greysia Polii (Indonesia) Apriyani Rahayu
23–28 January	Indonesia Masters (Report): Host: Jakarta, Indonesia; Venue: Istora Gelora Bung Karno; Level: Super 500; Prize: $350,000; Format: 32MS/32WS/32MD/32WD/32XD	Score: 21–17, 21–12	
23–28 January	Indonesia Masters (Report): Host: Jakarta, Indonesia; Venue: Istora Gelora Bung Karno; Level: Super 500; Prize: $350,000; Format: 32MS/32WS/32MD/32WD/32XD	(China) Zheng Siwei (China) Huang Yaqiong	(Indonesia) Tontowi Ahmad (Indonesia) Liliyana Natsir
23–28 January	Indonesia Masters (Report): Host: Jakarta, Indonesia; Venue: Istora Gelora Bung Karno; Level: Super 500; Prize: $350,000; Format: 32MS/32WS/32MD/32WD/32XD	Score: 21–14, 21–11	
30 Jan – 4 Feb	India Open (Report): Host: New Delhi, India; Venue: Siri Fort Sports Complex; Level: Super 500; Prize: $350,000; Format: 32MS/32WS/32MD/32WD/32XD	(China) Shi Yuqi	(Chinese Taipei) Chou Tien-chen
30 Jan – 4 Feb	India Open (Report): Host: New Delhi, India; Venue: Siri Fort Sports Complex; Level: Super 500; Prize: $350,000; Format: 32MS/32WS/32MD/32WD/32XD	Score: 21–18, 21–14	
30 Jan – 4 Feb	India Open (Report): Host: New Delhi, India; Venue: Siri Fort Sports Complex; Level: Super 500; Prize: $350,000; Format: 32MS/32WS/32MD/32WD/32XD	(United States) Beiwen Zhang	(India) P. V. Sindhu
30 Jan – 4 Feb	India Open (Report): Host: New Delhi, India; Venue: Siri Fort Sports Complex; Level: Super 500; Prize: $350,000; Format: 32MS/32WS/32MD/32WD/32XD	Score: 21–18, 11–21, 22–20	
30 Jan – 4 Feb	India Open (Report): Host: New Delhi, India; Venue: Siri Fort Sports Complex; Level: Super 500; Prize: $350,000; Format: 32MS/32WS/32MD/32WD/32XD	(Indonesia) Marcus Fernaldi Gideon (Indonesia) Kevin Sanjaya Sukamuljo	(Denmark) Kim Astrup (Denmark) Anders Skaarup Rasmussen
30 Jan – 4 Feb	India Open (Report): Host: New Delhi, India; Venue: Siri Fort Sports Complex; Level: Super 500; Prize: $350,000; Format: 32MS/32WS/32MD/32WD/32XD	Score: 21–14, 21–16	
30 Jan – 4 Feb	India Open (Report): Host: New Delhi, India; Venue: Siri Fort Sports Complex; Level: Super 500; Prize: $350,000; Format: 32MS/32WS/32MD/32WD/32XD	(Indonesia) Greysia Polii (Indonesia) Apriyani Rahayu	(Thailand) Jongkolphan Kititharakul (Thailand) Rawinda Prajongjai
30 Jan – 4 Feb	India Open (Report): Host: New Delhi, India; Venue: Siri Fort Sports Complex; Level: Super 500; Prize: $350,000; Format: 32MS/32WS/32MD/32WD/32XD	Score: 21–18, 21–15	
30 Jan – 4 Feb	India Open (Report): Host: New Delhi, India; Venue: Siri Fort Sports Complex; Level: Super 500; Prize: $350,000; Format: 32MS/32WS/32MD/32WD/32XD	(Denmark) Mathias Christiansen (Denmark) Christinna Pedersen	(Indonesia) Praveen Jordan (Indonesia) Melati Daeva Oktavianti
30 Jan – 4 Feb	India Open (Report): Host: New Delhi, India; Venue: Siri Fort Sports Complex; Level: Super 500; Prize: $350,000; Format: 32MS/32WS/32MD/32WD/32XD	Score: 21–14, 21–15	

=== February ===
Date	Tournament	Champions	Runners-up
20–25 February	Swiss Open (Report): Host: Basel, Switzerland; Venue: St. Jakobshalle; Level: Super 300; Prize: $150,000; Format: 32MS/32WS/32MD/32WD/32XD	(India) Sameer Verma	(Denmark) Jan Ø. Jørgensen
20–25 February	Swiss Open (Report): Host: Basel, Switzerland; Venue: St. Jakobshalle; Level: Super 300; Prize: $150,000; Format: 32MS/32WS/32MD/32WD/32XD	Score: 21–15, 21–13	
20–25 February	Swiss Open (Report): Host: Basel, Switzerland; Venue: St. Jakobshalle; Level: Super 300; Prize: $150,000; Format: 32MS/32WS/32MD/32WD/32XD	(Japan) Sayaka Takahashi	(Japan) Natsuki Nidaira
20–25 February	Swiss Open (Report): Host: Basel, Switzerland; Venue: St. Jakobshalle; Level: Super 300; Prize: $150,000; Format: 32MS/32WS/32MD/32WD/32XD	Score: 21–12, 21–18	
20–25 February	Swiss Open (Report): Host: Basel, Switzerland; Venue: St. Jakobshalle; Level: Super 300; Prize: $150,000; Format: 32MS/32WS/32MD/32WD/32XD	(Denmark) Mathias Boe (Denmark) Carsten Mogensen	(Thailand) Tinn Isriyanet (Thailand) Kittisak Namdash
20–25 February	Swiss Open (Report): Host: Basel, Switzerland; Venue: St. Jakobshalle; Level: Super 300; Prize: $150,000; Format: 32MS/32WS/32MD/32WD/32XD	Score: 21–15, 21–11	
20–25 February	Swiss Open (Report): Host: Basel, Switzerland; Venue: St. Jakobshalle; Level: Super 300; Prize: $150,000; Format: 32MS/32WS/32MD/32WD/32XD	(Japan) Ayako Sakuramoto (Japan) Yukiko Takahata	(Bulgaria) Gabriela Stoeva (Bulgaria) Stefani Stoeva
20–25 February	Swiss Open (Report): Host: Basel, Switzerland; Venue: St. Jakobshalle; Level: Super 300; Prize: $150,000; Format: 32MS/32WS/32MD/32WD/32XD	Score: 19–21, 21–15, 21–18	
20–25 February	Swiss Open (Report): Host: Basel, Switzerland; Venue: St. Jakobshalle; Level: Super 300; Prize: $150,000; Format: 32MS/32WS/32MD/32WD/32XD	(Germany) Mark Lamsfuß (Germany) Isabel Herttrich	(England) Marcus Ellis (England) Lauren Smith
20–25 February	Swiss Open (Report): Host: Basel, Switzerland; Venue: St. Jakobshalle; Level: Super 300; Prize: $150,000; Format: 32MS/32WS/32MD/32WD/32XD	Score: 22–20, 21–19	

=== March ===
Date	Tournament	Champions	Runners-up
6–11 March	German Open (Report): Host: Mülheim, Germany; Venue: Innogy Sporthalle; Level: Super 300; Prize: $150,000; Format: 32MS/32WS/32MD/32WD/32XD	(Chinese Taipei) Chou Tien-chen	(Hong Kong) Ng Ka Long
6–11 March	German Open (Report): Host: Mülheim, Germany; Venue: Innogy Sporthalle; Level: Super 300; Prize: $150,000; Format: 32MS/32WS/32MD/32WD/32XD	Score: 21–19, 18–21, 21–18	
6–11 March	German Open (Report): Host: Mülheim, Germany; Venue: Innogy Sporthalle; Level: Super 300; Prize: $150,000; Format: 32MS/32WS/32MD/32WD/32XD	(Japan) Akane Yamaguchi	(China) Chen Yufei
6–11 March	German Open (Report): Host: Mülheim, Germany; Venue: Innogy Sporthalle; Level: Super 300; Prize: $150,000; Format: 32MS/32WS/32MD/32WD/32XD	Score: 21–19, 6–21, 21–12	
6–11 March	German Open (Report): Host: Mülheim, Germany; Venue: Innogy Sporthalle; Level: Super 300; Prize: $150,000; Format: 32MS/32WS/32MD/32WD/32XD	(Japan) Takuto Inoue (Japan) Yuki Kaneko	(Indonesia) Fajar Alfian (Indonesia) Muhammad Rian Ardianto
6–11 March	German Open (Report): Host: Mülheim, Germany; Venue: Innogy Sporthalle; Level: Super 300; Prize: $150,000; Format: 32MS/32WS/32MD/32WD/32XD	Score: 21–16, 21–18	
6–11 March	German Open (Report): Host: Mülheim, Germany; Venue: Innogy Sporthalle; Level: Super 300; Prize: $150,000; Format: 32MS/32WS/32MD/32WD/32XD	(Japan) Yuki Fukushima (Japan) Sayaka Hirota	(China) Huang Dongping (China) Zheng Yu
6–11 March	German Open (Report): Host: Mülheim, Germany; Venue: Innogy Sporthalle; Level: Super 300; Prize: $150,000; Format: 32MS/32WS/32MD/32WD/32XD	Score: 18–21, 21–14, 21–6	
6–11 March	German Open (Report): Host: Mülheim, Germany; Venue: Innogy Sporthalle; Level: Super 300; Prize: $150,000; Format: 32MS/32WS/32MD/32WD/32XD	(Malaysia) Goh Soon Huat (Malaysia) Shevon Jemie Lai	(Denmark) Niclas Nøhr (Denmark) Sara Thygesen
6–11 March	German Open (Report): Host: Mülheim, Germany; Venue: Innogy Sporthalle; Level: Super 300; Prize: $150,000; Format: 32MS/32WS/32MD/32WD/32XD	Score: 21–14, 22–20	
14–18 March	All England Open (Report): Host: Birmingham, England; Venue: Arena Birmingham; Level: Super 1000; Prize: $1,000,000; Format: 32MS/32WS/32MD/32WD/32XD	(China) Shi Yuqi	(China) Lin Dan
14–18 March	All England Open (Report): Host: Birmingham, England; Venue: Arena Birmingham; Level: Super 1000; Prize: $1,000,000; Format: 32MS/32WS/32MD/32WD/32XD	Score: 21–19, 16–21, 21–9	
14–18 March	All England Open (Report): Host: Birmingham, England; Venue: Arena Birmingham; Level: Super 1000; Prize: $1,000,000; Format: 32MS/32WS/32MD/32WD/32XD	(Chinese Taipei) Tai Tzu-ying	(Japan) Akane Yamaguchi
14–18 March	All England Open (Report): Host: Birmingham, England; Venue: Arena Birmingham; Level: Super 1000; Prize: $1,000,000; Format: 32MS/32WS/32MD/32WD/32XD	Score: 22–20, 21–13	
14–18 March	All England Open (Report): Host: Birmingham, England; Venue: Arena Birmingham; Level: Super 1000; Prize: $1,000,000; Format: 32MS/32WS/32MD/32WD/32XD	(Indonesia) Marcus Fernaldi Gideon (Indonesia) Kevin Sanjaya Sukamuljo	(Denmark) Mathias Boe (Denmark) Carsten Mogensen
14–18 March	All England Open (Report): Host: Birmingham, England; Venue: Arena Birmingham; Level: Super 1000; Prize: $1,000,000; Format: 32MS/32WS/32MD/32WD/32XD	Score: 21–18, 21–17	
14–18 March	All England Open (Report): Host: Birmingham, England; Venue: Arena Birmingham; Level: Super 1000; Prize: $1,000,000; Format: 32MS/32WS/32MD/32WD/32XD	(Denmark) Kamilla Rytter Juhl (Denmark) Christinna Pedersen	(Japan) Yuki Fukushima (Japan) Sayaka Hirota
14–18 March	All England Open (Report): Host: Birmingham, England; Venue: Arena Birmingham; Level: Super 1000; Prize: $1,000,000; Format: 32MS/32WS/32MD/32WD/32XD	Score: 21–19, 21–18	
14–18 March	All England Open (Report): Host: Birmingham, England; Venue: Arena Birmingham; Level: Super 1000; Prize: $1,000,000; Format: 32MS/32WS/32MD/32WD/32XD	(Japan) Yuta Watanabe (Japan) Arisa Higashino	(China) Zheng Siwei (China) Huang Yaqiong
14–18 March	All England Open (Report): Host: Birmingham, England; Venue: Arena Birmingham; Level: Super 1000; Prize: $1,000,000; Format: 32MS/32WS/32MD/32WD/32XD	Score: 15–21, 22–20, 21–16	
27 Mar –1 Apr	Orléans Masters (Report): Host: Orléans, France; Venue: Palais des Sports; Level: Super 100; Prize: $75,000; Format: 64MS/32WS/32MD/32WD/32XD	(Netherlands) Mark Caljouw	(Denmark) Rasmus Gemke
27 Mar –1 Apr	Orléans Masters (Report): Host: Orléans, France; Venue: Palais des Sports; Level: Super 100; Prize: $75,000; Format: 64MS/32WS/32MD/32WD/32XD	Score: 10–21, 21–18, 21–8	
27 Mar –1 Apr	Orléans Masters (Report): Host: Orléans, France; Venue: Palais des Sports; Level: Super 100; Prize: $75,000; Format: 64MS/32WS/32MD/32WD/32XD	(Japan) Shiori Saito	(Denmark) Mia Blichfeldt
27 Mar –1 Apr	Orléans Masters (Report): Host: Orléans, France; Venue: Palais des Sports; Level: Super 100; Prize: $75,000; Format: 64MS/32WS/32MD/32WD/32XD	Score: 21–18, 21–14	
27 Mar –1 Apr	Orléans Masters (Report): Host: Orléans, France; Venue: Palais des Sports; Level: Super 100; Prize: $75,000; Format: 64MS/32WS/32MD/32WD/32XD	(Germany) Mark Lamsfuß (Germany) Marvin Emil Seidel	(Malaysia) Shia Chun Kang (Malaysia) Tan Wee Gieen
27 Mar –1 Apr	Orléans Masters (Report): Host: Orléans, France; Venue: Palais des Sports; Level: Super 100; Prize: $75,000; Format: 64MS/32WS/32MD/32WD/32XD	Score: 21–10, 21–18	
27 Mar –1 Apr	Orléans Masters (Report): Host: Orléans, France; Venue: Palais des Sports; Level: Super 100; Prize: $75,000; Format: 64MS/32WS/32MD/32WD/32XD	(Bulgaria) Gabriela Stoeva (Bulgaria) Stefani Stoeva	(France) Delphine Delrue (France) Léa Palermo
27 Mar –1 Apr	Orléans Masters (Report): Host: Orléans, France; Venue: Palais des Sports; Level: Super 100; Prize: $75,000; Format: 64MS/32WS/32MD/32WD/32XD	Score: 21–8, 21–14	
27 Mar –1 Apr	Orléans Masters (Report): Host: Orléans, France; Venue: Palais des Sports; Level: Super 100; Prize: $75,000; Format: 64MS/32WS/32MD/32WD/32XD	(Denmark) Niclas Nøhr (Denmark) Sara Thygesen	(Germany) Peter Käsbauer (Germany) Olga Konon
27 Mar –1 Apr	Orléans Masters (Report): Host: Orléans, France; Venue: Palais des Sports; Level: Super 100; Prize: $75,000; Format: 64MS/32WS/32MD/32WD/32XD	Score: 21–19, 21–9	

=== April ===
Date	Tournament	Champions	Runners-up
10–15 April	Lingshui China Masters (Report): Host: Lingshui, China; Venue: Agile Stadium; Level: Super 100; Prize: $75,000; Format: 64MS/32WS/32MD/32WD/32XD	(Chinese Taipei) Lin Yu-hsien	(China) Lu Guangzu
10–15 April	Lingshui China Masters (Report): Host: Lingshui, China; Venue: Agile Stadium; Level: Super 100; Prize: $75,000; Format: 64MS/32WS/32MD/32WD/32XD	Score: 12–21, 21–12, 21–14	
10–15 April	Lingshui China Masters (Report): Host: Lingshui, China; Venue: Agile Stadium; Level: Super 100; Prize: $75,000; Format: 64MS/32WS/32MD/32WD/32XD	(China) Li Xuerui	(South Korea) Kim Ga-eun
10–15 April	Lingshui China Masters (Report): Host: Lingshui, China; Venue: Agile Stadium; Level: Super 100; Prize: $75,000; Format: 64MS/32WS/32MD/32WD/32XD	Score: 16–21, 21–16, 21–18	
10–15 April	Lingshui China Masters (Report): Host: Lingshui, China; Venue: Agile Stadium; Level: Super 100; Prize: $75,000; Format: 64MS/32WS/32MD/32WD/32XD	(China) Han Chengkai (China) Zhou Haodong	(China) Di Zijian (China) Wang Chang
10–15 April	Lingshui China Masters (Report): Host: Lingshui, China; Venue: Agile Stadium; Level: Super 100; Prize: $75,000; Format: 64MS/32WS/32MD/32WD/32XD	Score: 19–21, 21–17, 21–16	
10–15 April	Lingshui China Masters (Report): Host: Lingshui, China; Venue: Agile Stadium; Level: Super 100; Prize: $75,000; Format: 64MS/32WS/32MD/32WD/32XD	(China) Du Yue (China) Li Yinhui	(China) Huang Dongping (China) Li Wenmei
10–15 April	Lingshui China Masters (Report): Host: Lingshui, China; Venue: Agile Stadium; Level: Super 100; Prize: $75,000; Format: 64MS/32WS/32MD/32WD/32XD	Score: 21–16, 21–18	
10–15 April	Lingshui China Masters (Report): Host: Lingshui, China; Venue: Agile Stadium; Level: Super 100; Prize: $75,000; Format: 64MS/32WS/32MD/32WD/32XD	(China) Guo Xinwa (China) Liu Xuanxuan	(Indonesia) Ronald Alexander (Indonesia) Annisa Saufika
10–15 April	Lingshui China Masters (Report): Host: Lingshui, China; Venue: Agile Stadium; Level: Super 100; Prize: $75,000; Format: 64MS/32WS/32MD/32WD/32XD	Score: 21–17, 7–21, 21–19	

=== May ===
Date	Tournament	Champions	Runners-up
1–6 May	New Zealand Open (Report): Host: Auckland, New Zealand; Venue: North Shore Events Centre; Level: Super 300; Prize: $150,000; Format: 32MS/32WS/32MD/32WD/32XD	(China) Lin Dan	(Indonesia) Jonatan Christie
1–6 May	New Zealand Open (Report): Host: Auckland, New Zealand; Venue: North Shore Events Centre; Level: Super 300; Prize: $150,000; Format: 32MS/32WS/32MD/32WD/32XD	Score: 21–14, 21–19	
1–6 May	New Zealand Open (Report): Host: Auckland, New Zealand; Venue: North Shore Events Centre; Level: Super 300; Prize: $150,000; Format: 32MS/32WS/32MD/32WD/32XD	(Japan) Sayaka Takahashi	(China) Zhang Yiman
1–6 May	New Zealand Open (Report): Host: Auckland, New Zealand; Venue: North Shore Events Centre; Level: Super 300; Prize: $150,000; Format: 32MS/32WS/32MD/32WD/32XD	Score: 21–13, 21–14	
1–6 May	New Zealand Open (Report): Host: Auckland, New Zealand; Venue: North Shore Events Centre; Level: Super 300; Prize: $150,000; Format: 32MS/32WS/32MD/32WD/32XD	(Chinese Taipei) Chen Hung-ling (Chinese Taipei) Wang Chi-lin	(Indonesia) Berry Angriawan (Indonesia) Hardianto
1–6 May	New Zealand Open (Report): Host: Auckland, New Zealand; Venue: North Shore Events Centre; Level: Super 300; Prize: $150,000; Format: 32MS/32WS/32MD/32WD/32XD	Score: 21–17, 21–17	
1–6 May	New Zealand Open (Report): Host: Auckland, New Zealand; Venue: North Shore Events Centre; Level: Super 300; Prize: $150,000; Format: 32MS/32WS/32MD/32WD/32XD	(Japan) Ayako Sakuramoto (Japan) Yukiko Takahata	(China) Cao Tongwei (China) Zheng Yu
1–6 May	New Zealand Open (Report): Host: Auckland, New Zealand; Venue: North Shore Events Centre; Level: Super 300; Prize: $150,000; Format: 32MS/32WS/32MD/32WD/32XD	Score: 21–9, 21–19	
1–6 May	New Zealand Open (Report): Host: Auckland, New Zealand; Venue: North Shore Events Centre; Level: Super 300; Prize: $150,000; Format: 32MS/32WS/32MD/32WD/32XD	(Chinese Taipei) Wang Chi-lin (Chinese Taipei) Lee Chia-hsin	(South Korea) Seo Seung-jae (South Korea) Chae Yoo-jung
1–6 May	New Zealand Open (Report): Host: Auckland, New Zealand; Venue: North Shore Events Centre; Level: Super 300; Prize: $150,000; Format: 32MS/32WS/32MD/32WD/32XD	Score: 21–19, 14–21, 21–19	
8–13 May	Australian Open (Report): Host: Sydney, Australia; Venue: Quaycentre; Level: Super 300; Prize: $150,000; Format: 32MS/32WS/32MD/32WD/32XD	(China) Lu Guangzu	(China) Zhou Zeqi
8–13 May	Australian Open (Report): Host: Sydney, Australia; Venue: Quaycentre; Level: Super 300; Prize: $150,000; Format: 32MS/32WS/32MD/32WD/32XD	Score: 21–8, 23–21	
8–13 May	Australian Open (Report): Host: Sydney, Australia; Venue: Quaycentre; Level: Super 300; Prize: $150,000; Format: 32MS/32WS/32MD/32WD/32XD	(China) Cai Yanyan	(Japan) Ayumi Mine
8–13 May	Australian Open (Report): Host: Sydney, Australia; Venue: Quaycentre; Level: Super 300; Prize: $150,000; Format: 32MS/32WS/32MD/32WD/32XD	Score: 21–14, 21–13	
8–13 May	Australian Open (Report): Host: Sydney, Australia; Venue: Quaycentre; Level: Super 300; Prize: $150,000; Format: 32MS/32WS/32MD/32WD/32XD	(Indonesia) Berry Angriawan (Indonesia) Hardianto	(Indonesia) Wahyu Nayaka Arya Pankaryanira (Indonesia) Ade Yusuf Santoso
8–13 May	Australian Open (Report): Host: Sydney, Australia; Venue: Quaycentre; Level: Super 300; Prize: $150,000; Format: 32MS/32WS/32MD/32WD/32XD	Score: 21–9, 9–21, 21–15	
8–13 May	Australian Open (Report): Host: Sydney, Australia; Venue: Quaycentre; Level: Super 300; Prize: $150,000; Format: 32MS/32WS/32MD/32WD/32XD	(Japan) Ayako Sakuramoto (Japan) Yukiko Takahata	(South Korea) Baek Ha-na (South Korea) Lee Yu-rim
8–13 May	Australian Open (Report): Host: Sydney, Australia; Venue: Quaycentre; Level: Super 300; Prize: $150,000; Format: 32MS/32WS/32MD/32WD/32XD	Score: 23–21, 21–18	
8–13 May	Australian Open (Report): Host: Sydney, Australia; Venue: Quaycentre; Level: Super 300; Prize: $150,000; Format: 32MS/32WS/32MD/32WD/32XD	(South Korea) Seo Seung-jae (South Korea) Chae Yoo-jung	(Malaysia) Chan Peng Soon (Malaysia) Goh Liu Ying
8–13 May	Australian Open (Report): Host: Sydney, Australia; Venue: Quaycentre; Level: Super 300; Prize: $150,000; Format: 32MS/32WS/32MD/32WD/32XD	Score: 21–12, 23–21	

=== June ===
Date	Tournament	Champions	Runners-up
12–17 June	U.S. Open (Report): Host: Fullerton, California, United States; Venue: Titan Gym; Level: Super 300; Prize: $150,000; Format: 32MS/32WS/32MD/32WD/32XD	(South Korea) Lee Dong-keun	(Netherlands) Mark Caljouw
12–17 June	U.S. Open (Report): Host: Fullerton, California, United States; Venue: Titan Gym; Level: Super 300; Prize: $150,000; Format: 32MS/32WS/32MD/32WD/32XD	Score: 14–21, 21–17, 21–16	
12–17 June	U.S. Open (Report): Host: Fullerton, California, United States; Venue: Titan Gym; Level: Super 300; Prize: $150,000; Format: 32MS/32WS/32MD/32WD/32XD	(China) Li Xuerui	(United States) Beiwen Zhang
12–17 June	U.S. Open (Report): Host: Fullerton, California, United States; Venue: Titan Gym; Level: Super 300; Prize: $150,000; Format: 32MS/32WS/32MD/32WD/32XD	Score: 24–26, 21–15, 21–11	
12–17 June	U.S. Open (Report): Host: Fullerton, California, United States; Venue: Titan Gym; Level: Super 300; Prize: $150,000; Format: 32MS/32WS/32MD/32WD/32XD	(China) Ou Xuanyi (China) Ren Xiangyu	(South Korea) Kang Min-hyuk (South Korea) Kim Won-ho
12–17 June	U.S. Open (Report): Host: Fullerton, California, United States; Venue: Titan Gym; Level: Super 300; Prize: $150,000; Format: 32MS/32WS/32MD/32WD/32XD	Score: 16–21, 21–16, 21–17	
12–17 June	U.S. Open (Report): Host: Fullerton, California, United States; Venue: Titan Gym; Level: Super 300; Prize: $150,000; Format: 32MS/32WS/32MD/32WD/32XD	(China) Tang Jinhua (China) Yu Xiaohan	(South Korea) Kim Hye-jeong (South Korea) Kim So-yeong
12–17 June	U.S. Open (Report): Host: Fullerton, California, United States; Venue: Titan Gym; Level: Super 300; Prize: $150,000; Format: 32MS/32WS/32MD/32WD/32XD	Score: 18–21, 21–13, 21–15	
12–17 June	U.S. Open (Report): Host: Fullerton, California, United States; Venue: Titan Gym; Level: Super 300; Prize: $150,000; Format: 32MS/32WS/32MD/32WD/32XD	(Malaysia) Chan Peng Soon (Malaysia) Goh Liu Ying	(Germany) Marvin Emil Seidel (Germany) Linda Efler
12–17 June	U.S. Open (Report): Host: Fullerton, California, United States; Venue: Titan Gym; Level: Super 300; Prize: $150,000; Format: 32MS/32WS/32MD/32WD/32XD	Score: 21–19, 21–15	
19–24 June	Canada Open (Report): Host: Calgary, Canada; Venue: Markin-MacPhail Centre; Level: Super 100; Prize: $75,000; Format: 64MS/32WS/32MD/32WD/32XD	(China) Lu Guangzu	(Japan) Minoru Koga
19–24 June	Canada Open (Report): Host: Calgary, Canada; Venue: Markin-MacPhail Centre; Level: Super 100; Prize: $75,000; Format: 64MS/32WS/32MD/32WD/32XD	Score: 21–15, 21–10	
19–24 June	Canada Open (Report): Host: Calgary, Canada; Venue: Markin-MacPhail Centre; Level: Super 100; Prize: $75,000; Format: 64MS/32WS/32MD/32WD/32XD	(China) Li Xuerui	(Japan) Sayaka Takahashi
19–24 June	Canada Open (Report): Host: Calgary, Canada; Venue: Markin-MacPhail Centre; Level: Super 100; Prize: $75,000; Format: 64MS/32WS/32MD/32WD/32XD	Score: 22–20, 15–21, 21–17	
19–24 June	Canada Open (Report): Host: Calgary, Canada; Venue: Markin-MacPhail Centre; Level: Super 100; Prize: $75,000; Format: 64MS/32WS/32MD/32WD/32XD	(England) Marcus Ellis (England) Chris Langridge	(Germany) Mark Lamsfuß (Germany) Marvin Emil Seidel
19–24 June	Canada Open (Report): Host: Calgary, Canada; Venue: Markin-MacPhail Centre; Level: Super 100; Prize: $75,000; Format: 64MS/32WS/32MD/32WD/32XD	Score: 19–21, 21–18, 22–20	
19–24 June	Canada Open (Report): Host: Calgary, Canada; Venue: Markin-MacPhail Centre; Level: Super 100; Prize: $75,000; Format: 64MS/32WS/32MD/32WD/32XD	(Japan) Ayako Sakuramoto (Japan) Yukiko Takahata	(Germany) Isabel Herttrich (Germany) Carla Nelte
19–24 June	Canada Open (Report): Host: Calgary, Canada; Venue: Markin-MacPhail Centre; Level: Super 100; Prize: $75,000; Format: 64MS/32WS/32MD/32WD/32XD	Score: 21–13, 21–15	
19–24 June	Canada Open (Report): Host: Calgary, Canada; Venue: Markin-MacPhail Centre; Level: Super 100; Prize: $75,000; Format: 64MS/32WS/32MD/32WD/32XD	(England) Marcus Ellis (England) Lauren Smith	(Germany) Mark Lamsfuß (Germany) Isabel Herttrich
19–24 June	Canada Open (Report): Host: Calgary, Canada; Venue: Markin-MacPhail Centre; Level: Super 100; Prize: $75,000; Format: 64MS/32WS/32MD/32WD/32XD	Score: 21–13, 21–4	
26 Jun – 1 Jul	Malaysia Open (Report): Host: Kuala Lumpur, Malaysia; Venue: Axiata Arena; Level: Super 750; Prize: $700,000; Format: 32MS/32WS/32MD/32WD/32XD	(Malaysia) Lee Chong Wei	(Japan) Kento Momota
26 Jun – 1 Jul	Malaysia Open (Report): Host: Kuala Lumpur, Malaysia; Venue: Axiata Arena; Level: Super 750; Prize: $700,000; Format: 32MS/32WS/32MD/32WD/32XD	Score: 21–17, 23–21	
26 Jun – 1 Jul	Malaysia Open (Report): Host: Kuala Lumpur, Malaysia; Venue: Axiata Arena; Level: Super 750; Prize: $700,000; Format: 32MS/32WS/32MD/32WD/32XD	(Chinese Taipei) Tai Tzu-ying	(China) He Bingjiao
26 Jun – 1 Jul	Malaysia Open (Report): Host: Kuala Lumpur, Malaysia; Venue: Axiata Arena; Level: Super 750; Prize: $700,000; Format: 32MS/32WS/32MD/32WD/32XD	Score: 22–20, 21–11	
26 Jun – 1 Jul	Malaysia Open (Report): Host: Kuala Lumpur, Malaysia; Venue: Axiata Arena; Level: Super 750; Prize: $700,000; Format: 32MS/32WS/32MD/32WD/32XD	(Japan) Takeshi Kamura (Japan) Keigo Sonoda	(Japan) Hiroyuki Endo (Japan) Yuta Watanabe
26 Jun – 1 Jul	Malaysia Open (Report): Host: Kuala Lumpur, Malaysia; Venue: Axiata Arena; Level: Super 750; Prize: $700,000; Format: 32MS/32WS/32MD/32WD/32XD	Score: 21–8, 21–10	
26 Jun – 1 Jul	Malaysia Open (Report): Host: Kuala Lumpur, Malaysia; Venue: Axiata Arena; Level: Super 750; Prize: $700,000; Format: 32MS/32WS/32MD/32WD/32XD	(Japan) Misaki Matsutomo (Japan) Ayaka Takahashi	(China) Chen Qingchen (China) Jia Yifan
26 Jun – 1 Jul	Malaysia Open (Report): Host: Kuala Lumpur, Malaysia; Venue: Axiata Arena; Level: Super 750; Prize: $700,000; Format: 32MS/32WS/32MD/32WD/32XD	Score: 21–12, 21–12	
26 Jun – 1 Jul	Malaysia Open (Report): Host: Kuala Lumpur, Malaysia; Venue: Axiata Arena; Level: Super 750; Prize: $700,000; Format: 32MS/32WS/32MD/32WD/32XD	(China) Zheng Siwei (China) Huang Yaqiong	(China) Wang Yilyu (China) Huang Dongping
26 Jun – 1 Jul	Malaysia Open (Report): Host: Kuala Lumpur, Malaysia; Venue: Axiata Arena; Level: Super 750; Prize: $700,000; Format: 32MS/32WS/32MD/32WD/32XD	Score: 21–19, 21–18	

=== July ===
Date	Tournament	Champions	Runners-up
3–8 July	Indonesia Open (Report): Host: Jakarta, Indonesia; Venue: Istora Gelora Bung Karno; Level: Super 1000; Prize: $1,250,000; Format: 32MS/32WS/32MD/32WD/32XD	(Japan) Kento Momota	(Denmark) Viktor Axelsen
3–8 July	Indonesia Open (Report): Host: Jakarta, Indonesia; Venue: Istora Gelora Bung Karno; Level: Super 1000; Prize: $1,250,000; Format: 32MS/32WS/32MD/32WD/32XD	Score: 21–14, 21–9	
3–8 July	Indonesia Open (Report): Host: Jakarta, Indonesia; Venue: Istora Gelora Bung Karno; Level: Super 1000; Prize: $1,250,000; Format: 32MS/32WS/32MD/32WD/32XD	(Chinese Taipei) Tai Tzu-ying	(China) Chen Yufei
3–8 July	Indonesia Open (Report): Host: Jakarta, Indonesia; Venue: Istora Gelora Bung Karno; Level: Super 1000; Prize: $1,250,000; Format: 32MS/32WS/32MD/32WD/32XD	Score: 21–23, 21–15, 21–9	
3–8 July	Indonesia Open (Report): Host: Jakarta, Indonesia; Venue: Istora Gelora Bung Karno; Level: Super 1000; Prize: $1,250,000; Format: 32MS/32WS/32MD/32WD/32XD	(Indonesia) Marcus Fernaldi Gideon (Indonesia) Kevin Sanjaya Sukamuljo	(Japan) Takuto Inoue (Japan) Yuki Kaneko
3–8 July	Indonesia Open (Report): Host: Jakarta, Indonesia; Venue: Istora Gelora Bung Karno; Level: Super 1000; Prize: $1,250,000; Format: 32MS/32WS/32MD/32WD/32XD	Score: 21–13, 21–16	
3–8 July	Indonesia Open (Report): Host: Jakarta, Indonesia; Venue: Istora Gelora Bung Karno; Level: Super 1000; Prize: $1,250,000; Format: 32MS/32WS/32MD/32WD/32XD	(Japan) Yuki Fukushima (Japan) Sayaka Hirota	(Japan) Mayu Matsumoto (Japan) Wakana Nagahara
3–8 July	Indonesia Open (Report): Host: Jakarta, Indonesia; Venue: Istora Gelora Bung Karno; Level: Super 1000; Prize: $1,250,000; Format: 32MS/32WS/32MD/32WD/32XD	Score: 21–14, 16–21, 21–14	
3–8 July	Indonesia Open (Report): Host: Jakarta, Indonesia; Venue: Istora Gelora Bung Karno; Level: Super 1000; Prize: $1,250,000; Format: 32MS/32WS/32MD/32WD/32XD	(Indonesia) Tontowi Ahmad (Indonesia) Liliyana Natsir	(Malaysia) Chan Peng Soon (Malaysia) Goh Liu Ying
3–8 July	Indonesia Open (Report): Host: Jakarta, Indonesia; Venue: Istora Gelora Bung Karno; Level: Super 1000; Prize: $1,250,000; Format: 32MS/32WS/32MD/32WD/32XD	Score: 21–17, 21–8	
10–15 July	Thailand Open (Report): Host: Bangkok, Thailand; Venue: Nimibutr Stadium; Level: Super 500; Prize: $350,000; Format: 32MS/32WS/32MD/32WD/32XD	(Japan) Kanta Tsuneyama	(Indonesia) Tommy Sugiarto
10–15 July	Thailand Open (Report): Host: Bangkok, Thailand; Venue: Nimibutr Stadium; Level: Super 500; Prize: $350,000; Format: 32MS/32WS/32MD/32WD/32XD	Score: 21–16, 13–21, 21–9	
10–15 July	Thailand Open (Report): Host: Bangkok, Thailand; Venue: Nimibutr Stadium; Level: Super 500; Prize: $350,000; Format: 32MS/32WS/32MD/32WD/32XD	(Japan) Nozomi Okuhara	(India) P. V. Sindhu
10–15 July	Thailand Open (Report): Host: Bangkok, Thailand; Venue: Nimibutr Stadium; Level: Super 500; Prize: $350,000; Format: 32MS/32WS/32MD/32WD/32XD	Score: 21–15, 21–18	
10–15 July	Thailand Open (Report): Host: Bangkok, Thailand; Venue: Nimibutr Stadium; Level: Super 500; Prize: $350,000; Format: 32MS/32WS/32MD/32WD/32XD	(Japan) Takeshi Kamura (Japan) Keigo Sonoda	(Japan) Hiroyuki Endo (Japan) Yuta Watanabe
10–15 July	Thailand Open (Report): Host: Bangkok, Thailand; Venue: Nimibutr Stadium; Level: Super 500; Prize: $350,000; Format: 32MS/32WS/32MD/32WD/32XD	Score: 21–17, 21–19	
10–15 July	Thailand Open (Report): Host: Bangkok, Thailand; Venue: Nimibutr Stadium; Level: Super 500; Prize: $350,000; Format: 32MS/32WS/32MD/32WD/32XD	(Indonesia) Greysia Polii (Indonesia) Apriyani Rahayu	(Japan) Misaki Matsutomo (Japan) Ayaka Takahashi
10–15 July	Thailand Open (Report): Host: Bangkok, Thailand; Venue: Nimibutr Stadium; Level: Super 500; Prize: $350,000; Format: 32MS/32WS/32MD/32WD/32XD	Score: 21–13, 21–10	
10–15 July	Thailand Open (Report): Host: Bangkok, Thailand; Venue: Nimibutr Stadium; Level: Super 500; Prize: $350,000; Format: 32MS/32WS/32MD/32WD/32XD	(Indonesia) Hafiz Faizal (Indonesia) Gloria Emanuelle Widjaja	(England) Chris Adcock (England) Gabby Adcock
10–15 July	Thailand Open (Report): Host: Bangkok, Thailand; Venue: Nimibutr Stadium; Level: Super 500; Prize: $350,000; Format: 32MS/32WS/32MD/32WD/32XD	Score: 21–12, 21–12	
17–22 July	Singapore Open (Report): Host: Singapore; Venue: Singapore Indoor Stadium; Level: Super 500; Prize: $350,000; Format: 32MS/32WS/32MD/32WD/32XD	(Chinese Taipei) Chou Tien-chen	(Chinese Taipei) Hsu Jen-hao
17–22 July	Singapore Open (Report): Host: Singapore; Venue: Singapore Indoor Stadium; Level: Super 500; Prize: $350,000; Format: 32MS/32WS/32MD/32WD/32XD	Score: 21–13, 21–13	
17–22 July	Singapore Open (Report): Host: Singapore; Venue: Singapore Indoor Stadium; Level: Super 500; Prize: $350,000; Format: 32MS/32WS/32MD/32WD/32XD	(Japan) Sayaka Takahashi	(China) Gao Fangjie
17–22 July	Singapore Open (Report): Host: Singapore; Venue: Singapore Indoor Stadium; Level: Super 500; Prize: $350,000; Format: 32MS/32WS/32MD/32WD/32XD	Score: 25–23, 21–14	
17–22 July	Singapore Open (Report): Host: Singapore; Venue: Singapore Indoor Stadium; Level: Super 500; Prize: $350,000; Format: 32MS/32WS/32MD/32WD/32XD	(Indonesia) Mohammad Ahsan (Indonesia) Hendra Setiawan	(China) Ou Xuanyi (China) Ren Xiangyu
17–22 July	Singapore Open (Report): Host: Singapore; Venue: Singapore Indoor Stadium; Level: Super 500; Prize: $350,000; Format: 32MS/32WS/32MD/32WD/32XD	Score: 21–13, 21–19	
17–22 July	Singapore Open (Report): Host: Singapore; Venue: Singapore Indoor Stadium; Level: Super 500; Prize: $350,000; Format: 32MS/32WS/32MD/32WD/32XD	(Japan) Ayako Sakuramoto (Japan) Yukiko Takahata	(Japan) Nami Matsuyama (Japan) Chiharu Shida
17–22 July	Singapore Open (Report): Host: Singapore; Venue: Singapore Indoor Stadium; Level: Super 500; Prize: $350,000; Format: 32MS/32WS/32MD/32WD/32XD	Score: 16–21, 24–22, 21–13	
17–22 July	Singapore Open (Report): Host: Singapore; Venue: Singapore Indoor Stadium; Level: Super 500; Prize: $350,000; Format: 32MS/32WS/32MD/32WD/32XD	(Malaysia) Goh Soon Huat (Malaysia) Shevon Jemie Lai	(Indonesia) Tontowi Ahmad (Indonesia) Liliyana Natsir
17–22 July	Singapore Open (Report): Host: Singapore; Venue: Singapore Indoor Stadium; Level: Super 500; Prize: $350,000; Format: 32MS/32WS/32MD/32WD/32XD	Score: 21–19, 21–18	
24–29 July	Akita Masters (Report): Host: Akita, Akita Prefecture, Japan; Venue: CNA Arena Akita; Level: Super 100; Prize: $75,000; Format: 64MS/32WS/32MD/32WD/32XD	(Thailand) Sitthikom Thammasin	(Indonesia) Ihsan Maulana Mustofa
24–29 July	Akita Masters (Report): Host: Akita, Akita Prefecture, Japan; Venue: CNA Arena Akita; Level: Super 100; Prize: $75,000; Format: 64MS/32WS/32MD/32WD/32XD	Score: 21–10, 21–13	
24–29 July	Akita Masters (Report): Host: Akita, Akita Prefecture, Japan; Venue: CNA Arena Akita; Level: Super 100; Prize: $75,000; Format: 64MS/32WS/32MD/32WD/32XD	(Japan) Sayaka Takahashi	(Japan) Mako Urushizaki
24–29 July	Akita Masters (Report): Host: Akita, Akita Prefecture, Japan; Venue: CNA Arena Akita; Level: Super 100; Prize: $75,000; Format: 64MS/32WS/32MD/32WD/32XD	Score: 21–11, 13–21, 21–18	
24–29 July	Akita Masters (Report): Host: Akita, Akita Prefecture, Japan; Venue: CNA Arena Akita; Level: Super 100; Prize: $75,000; Format: 64MS/32WS/32MD/32WD/32XD	(Indonesia) Akbar Bintang Cahyono (Indonesia) Muhammad Reza Pahlevi Isfahani	(Japan) Hirokatsu Hashimoto (Japan) Hiroyuki Saeki
24–29 July	Akita Masters (Report): Host: Akita, Akita Prefecture, Japan; Venue: CNA Arena Akita; Level: Super 100; Prize: $75,000; Format: 64MS/32WS/32MD/32WD/32XD	Score: 21–16, 21–6	
24–29 July	Akita Masters (Report): Host: Akita, Akita Prefecture, Japan; Venue: CNA Arena Akita; Level: Super 100; Prize: $75,000; Format: 64MS/32WS/32MD/32WD/32XD	(Japan) Ayako Sakuramoto (Japan) Yukiko Takahata	(Japan) Nami Matsuyama (Japan) Chiharu Shida
24–29 July	Akita Masters (Report): Host: Akita, Akita Prefecture, Japan; Venue: CNA Arena Akita; Level: Super 100; Prize: $75,000; Format: 64MS/32WS/32MD/32WD/32XD	Score: 23–21, 21–11	
24–29 July	Akita Masters (Report): Host: Akita, Akita Prefecture, Japan; Venue: CNA Arena Akita; Level: Super 100; Prize: $75,000; Format: 64MS/32WS/32MD/32WD/32XD	(Japan) Kohei Gondo (Japan) Ayane Kurihara	(Indonesia) Alfian Eko Prasetya (Indonesia) Angelica Wiratama
24–29 July	Akita Masters (Report): Host: Akita, Akita Prefecture, Japan; Venue: CNA Arena Akita; Level: Super 100; Prize: $75,000; Format: 64MS/32WS/32MD/32WD/32XD	Score: 21–9, 21–23, 21–17	
24–29 July	Russian Open (Report): Host: Vladivostok, Russia; Venue: Olympic Sport Hall; Level: Super 100; Prize: $75,000; Format: 64MS/32WS/32MD/32WD/32XD	(India) Sourabh Verma	(Japan) Koki Watanabe
24–29 July	Russian Open (Report): Host: Vladivostok, Russia; Venue: Olympic Sport Hall; Level: Super 100; Prize: $75,000; Format: 64MS/32WS/32MD/32WD/32XD	Score: 18–21, 21–12, 21–17	
24–29 July	Russian Open (Report): Host: Vladivostok, Russia; Venue: Olympic Sport Hall; Level: Super 100; Prize: $75,000; Format: 64MS/32WS/32MD/32WD/32XD	(Malaysia) Ho Yen Mei	(Japan) Shiori Ebihara
24–29 July	Russian Open (Report): Host: Vladivostok, Russia; Venue: Olympic Sport Hall; Level: Super 100; Prize: $75,000; Format: 64MS/32WS/32MD/32WD/32XD	Score: 22–20, 11–21, 21–18	
24–29 July	Russian Open (Report): Host: Vladivostok, Russia; Venue: Olympic Sport Hall; Level: Super 100; Prize: $75,000; Format: 64MS/32WS/32MD/32WD/32XD	(Malaysia) Mohamad Arif Abdul Latif (Malaysia) Nur Mohd Azriyn Ayub	(Russia) Konstantin Abramov (Russia) Alexandr Zinchenko
24–29 July	Russian Open (Report): Host: Vladivostok, Russia; Venue: Olympic Sport Hall; Level: Super 100; Prize: $75,000; Format: 64MS/32WS/32MD/32WD/32XD	Score: Walkover	
24–29 July	Russian Open (Report): Host: Vladivostok, Russia; Venue: Olympic Sport Hall; Level: Super 100; Prize: $75,000; Format: 64MS/32WS/32MD/32WD/32XD	(Japan) Chisato Hoshi (Japan) Kie Nakanishi	(Malaysia) Chow Mei Kuan (Malaysia) Lee Meng Yean
24–29 July	Russian Open (Report): Host: Vladivostok, Russia; Venue: Olympic Sport Hall; Level: Super 100; Prize: $75,000; Format: 64MS/32WS/32MD/32WD/32XD	Score: 21–11, 21–18	
24–29 July	Russian Open (Report): Host: Vladivostok, Russia; Venue: Olympic Sport Hall; Level: Super 100; Prize: $75,000; Format: 64MS/32WS/32MD/32WD/32XD	(Russia) Vladimir Ivanov (South Korea) Kim Min-kyung	(India) Rohan Kapoor (India) Kuhoo Garg
24–29 July	Russian Open (Report): Host: Vladivostok, Russia; Venue: Olympic Sport Hall; Level: Super 100; Prize: $75,000; Format: 64MS/32WS/32MD/32WD/32XD	Score: 21–19, 21–17	

=== August ===
Date	Tournament	Champions	Runners-up
7–12 August	Vietnam Open (Report): Host: Ho Chi Minh City, Vietnam; Venue: Nguyen Du Cultural Sports Club; Level: Super 100; Prize: $75,000; Format: 64MS/32WS/32MD/32WD/32XD	(Indonesia) Shesar Hiren Rhustavito	(India) Ajay Jayaram
7–12 August	Vietnam Open (Report): Host: Ho Chi Minh City, Vietnam; Venue: Nguyen Du Cultural Sports Club; Level: Super 100; Prize: $75,000; Format: 64MS/32WS/32MD/32WD/32XD	Score: 21–14, 21–10	
7–12 August	Vietnam Open (Report): Host: Ho Chi Minh City, Vietnam; Venue: Nguyen Du Cultural Sports Club; Level: Super 100; Prize: $75,000; Format: 64MS/32WS/32MD/32WD/32XD	(Singapore) Yeo Jia Min	(China) Han Yue
7–12 August	Vietnam Open (Report): Host: Ho Chi Minh City, Vietnam; Venue: Nguyen Du Cultural Sports Club; Level: Super 100; Prize: $75,000; Format: 64MS/32WS/32MD/32WD/32XD	Score: 21–19, 21–19	
7–12 August	Vietnam Open (Report): Host: Ho Chi Minh City, Vietnam; Venue: Nguyen Du Cultural Sports Club; Level: Super 100; Prize: $75,000; Format: 64MS/32WS/32MD/32WD/32XD	(South Korea) Ko Sung-hyun (South Korea) Shin Baek-cheol	(Chinese Taipei) Lee Sheng-mu (Chinese Taipei) Yang Po-hsuan
7–12 August	Vietnam Open (Report): Host: Ho Chi Minh City, Vietnam; Venue: Nguyen Du Cultural Sports Club; Level: Super 100; Prize: $75,000; Format: 64MS/32WS/32MD/32WD/32XD	Score: 22–20, 21–18	
7–12 August	Vietnam Open (Report): Host: Ho Chi Minh City, Vietnam; Venue: Nguyen Du Cultural Sports Club; Level: Super 100; Prize: $75,000; Format: 64MS/32WS/32MD/32WD/32XD	(Japan) Misato Aratama (Japan) Akane Watanabe	(Japan) Nami Matsuyama (Japan) Chiharu Shida
7–12 August	Vietnam Open (Report): Host: Ho Chi Minh City, Vietnam; Venue: Nguyen Du Cultural Sports Club; Level: Super 100; Prize: $75,000; Format: 64MS/32WS/32MD/32WD/32XD	Score: 21–18, 21–19	
7–12 August	Vietnam Open (Report): Host: Ho Chi Minh City, Vietnam; Venue: Nguyen Du Cultural Sports Club; Level: Super 100; Prize: $75,000; Format: 64MS/32WS/32MD/32WD/32XD	(Thailand) Nipitphon Phuangphuapet (Thailand) Savitree Amitrapai	(Indonesia) Alfian Eko Prasetya (Indonesia) Marsheilla Gischa Islami
7–12 August	Vietnam Open (Report): Host: Ho Chi Minh City, Vietnam; Venue: Nguyen Du Cultural Sports Club; Level: Super 100; Prize: $75,000; Format: 64MS/32WS/32MD/32WD/32XD	Score: 13–21, 21–18, 21–19	
28 Aug – 2 Sep	Spain Masters (Report): Host: Barcelona, Spain; Venue: Vall d’Hebron Olympic Sports Center; Level: Super 300; Prize: $150,000; Format: 32MS/32WS/32MD/32WD/32XD	(Denmark) Rasmus Gemke	(Thailand) Suppanyu Avihingsanon
28 Aug – 2 Sep	Spain Masters (Report): Host: Barcelona, Spain; Venue: Vall d’Hebron Olympic Sports Center; Level: Super 300; Prize: $150,000; Format: 32MS/32WS/32MD/32WD/32XD	Score: 15–21, 21–6, 21–14	
28 Aug – 2 Sep	Spain Masters (Report): Host: Barcelona, Spain; Venue: Vall d’Hebron Olympic Sports Center; Level: Super 300; Prize: $150,000; Format: 32MS/32WS/32MD/32WD/32XD	(Japan) Minatsu Mitani	(Denmark) Mia Blichfeldt
28 Aug – 2 Sep	Spain Masters (Report): Host: Barcelona, Spain; Venue: Vall d’Hebron Olympic Sports Center; Level: Super 300; Prize: $150,000; Format: 32MS/32WS/32MD/32WD/32XD	Score: 9–21, 23–21, 21–8	
28 Aug – 2 Sep	Spain Masters (Report): Host: Barcelona, Spain; Venue: Vall d’Hebron Olympic Sports Center; Level: Super 300; Prize: $150,000; Format: 32MS/32WS/32MD/32WD/32XD	(South Korea) Kim Gi-jung (South Korea) Lee Yong-dae	(Thailand) Bodin Isara (Thailand) Maneepong Jongjit
28 Aug – 2 Sep	Spain Masters (Report): Host: Barcelona, Spain; Venue: Vall d’Hebron Olympic Sports Center; Level: Super 300; Prize: $150,000; Format: 32MS/32WS/32MD/32WD/32XD	Score: 21–13, 21–17	
28 Aug – 2 Sep	Spain Masters (Report): Host: Barcelona, Spain; Venue: Vall d’Hebron Olympic Sports Center; Level: Super 300; Prize: $150,000; Format: 32MS/32WS/32MD/32WD/32XD	(Japan) Mayu Matsumoto (Japan) Wakana Nagahara	(Japan) Ayako Sakuramoto (Japan) Yukiko Takahata
28 Aug – 2 Sep	Spain Masters (Report): Host: Barcelona, Spain; Venue: Vall d’Hebron Olympic Sports Center; Level: Super 300; Prize: $150,000; Format: 32MS/32WS/32MD/32WD/32XD	Score: 21–17, 21–13	
28 Aug – 2 Sep	Spain Masters (Report): Host: Barcelona, Spain; Venue: Vall d’Hebron Olympic Sports Center; Level: Super 300; Prize: $150,000; Format: 32MS/32WS/32MD/32WD/32XD	(Denmark) Niclas Nøhr (Denmark) Sara Thygesen	(England) Marcus Ellis (England) Lauren Smith
28 Aug – 2 Sep	Spain Masters (Report): Host: Barcelona, Spain; Venue: Vall d’Hebron Olympic Sports Center; Level: Super 300; Prize: $150,000; Format: 32MS/32WS/32MD/32WD/32XD	Score: 21–19, 21–17	

=== September ===
Date	Tournament	Champions	Runners-up
4–9 September	Hyderabad Open (Report): Host: Hyderabad, India; Venue: G. M. C. Balayogi SATS Indoor Stadium; Level: Super 100; Prize: $75,000; Format: 64MS/32WS/32MD/32WD/32XD	(India) Sameer Verma	(Malaysia) Soong Joo Ven
4–9 September	Hyderabad Open (Report): Host: Hyderabad, India; Venue: G. M. C. Balayogi SATS Indoor Stadium; Level: Super 100; Prize: $75,000; Format: 64MS/32WS/32MD/32WD/32XD	Score: 21–15, 21–18	
4–9 September	Hyderabad Open (Report): Host: Hyderabad, India; Venue: G. M. C. Balayogi SATS Indoor Stadium; Level: Super 100; Prize: $75,000; Format: 64MS/32WS/32MD/32WD/32XD	(South Korea) Kim Ga-eun	(Hong Kong) Deng Xuan
4–9 September	Hyderabad Open (Report): Host: Hyderabad, India; Venue: G. M. C. Balayogi SATS Indoor Stadium; Level: Super 100; Prize: $75,000; Format: 64MS/32WS/32MD/32WD/32XD	Score: 21–9, 18–21, 21–17	
4–9 September	Hyderabad Open (Report): Host: Hyderabad, India; Venue: G. M. C. Balayogi SATS Indoor Stadium; Level: Super 100; Prize: $75,000; Format: 64MS/32WS/32MD/32WD/32XD	(India) Satwiksairaj Rankireddy (India) Chirag Shetty	(Indonesia) Akbar Bintang Cahyono (Indonesia) Muhammad Reza Pahlevi Isfahani
4–9 September	Hyderabad Open (Report): Host: Hyderabad, India; Venue: G. M. C. Balayogi SATS Indoor Stadium; Level: Super 100; Prize: $75,000; Format: 64MS/32WS/32MD/32WD/32XD	Score: 21–16, 21–14	
4–9 September	Hyderabad Open (Report): Host: Hyderabad, India; Venue: G. M. C. Balayogi SATS Indoor Stadium; Level: Super 100; Prize: $75,000; Format: 64MS/32WS/32MD/32WD/32XD	(Hong Kong) Ng Tsz Yau (Hong Kong) Yuen Sin Ying	(Malaysia) Vivian Hoo (Malaysia) Yap Cheng Wen
4–9 September	Hyderabad Open (Report): Host: Hyderabad, India; Venue: G. M. C. Balayogi SATS Indoor Stadium; Level: Super 100; Prize: $75,000; Format: 64MS/32WS/32MD/32WD/32XD	Score: 21–18, 16–21, 21–14	
4–9 September	Hyderabad Open (Report): Host: Hyderabad, India; Venue: G. M. C. Balayogi SATS Indoor Stadium; Level: Super 100; Prize: $75,000; Format: 64MS/32WS/32MD/32WD/32XD	(Indonesia) Akbar Bintang Cahyono (Indonesia) Winny Oktavina Kandow	(India) Pranav Chopra (India) N. Sikki Reddy
4–9 September	Hyderabad Open (Report): Host: Hyderabad, India; Venue: G. M. C. Balayogi SATS Indoor Stadium; Level: Super 100; Prize: $75,000; Format: 64MS/32WS/32MD/32WD/32XD	Score: 15–21, 21–19, 25–23	
11–16 September	Japan Open (Report): Host: Tokyo, Japan; Venue: Musashino Forest Sport Plaza; Level: Super 750; Prize: $700,000; Format: 32MS/32WS/32MD/32WD/32XD	(Japan) Kento Momota	(Thailand) Khosit Phetpradab
11–16 September	Japan Open (Report): Host: Tokyo, Japan; Venue: Musashino Forest Sport Plaza; Level: Super 750; Prize: $700,000; Format: 32MS/32WS/32MD/32WD/32XD	Score: 21–14, 21–11	
11–16 September	Japan Open (Report): Host: Tokyo, Japan; Venue: Musashino Forest Sport Plaza; Level: Super 750; Prize: $700,000; Format: 32MS/32WS/32MD/32WD/32XD	(Spain) Carolina Marín	(Japan) Nozomi Okuhara
11–16 September	Japan Open (Report): Host: Tokyo, Japan; Venue: Musashino Forest Sport Plaza; Level: Super 750; Prize: $700,000; Format: 32MS/32WS/32MD/32WD/32XD	Score: 21–19, 17–21, 21–11	
11–16 September	Japan Open (Report): Host: Tokyo, Japan; Venue: Musashino Forest Sport Plaza; Level: Super 750; Prize: $700,000; Format: 32MS/32WS/32MD/32WD/32XD	(Indonesia) Marcus Fernaldi Gideon (Indonesia) Kevin Sanjaya Sukamuljo	(China) Li Junhui (China) Liu Yuchen
11–16 September	Japan Open (Report): Host: Tokyo, Japan; Venue: Musashino Forest Sport Plaza; Level: Super 750; Prize: $700,000; Format: 32MS/32WS/32MD/32WD/32XD	Score: 21–11, 21–13	
11–16 September	Japan Open (Report): Host: Tokyo, Japan; Venue: Musashino Forest Sport Plaza; Level: Super 750; Prize: $700,000; Format: 32MS/32WS/32MD/32WD/32XD	(Japan) Yuki Fukushima (Japan) Sayaka Hirota	(China) Chen Qingchen (China) Jia Yifan
11–16 September	Japan Open (Report): Host: Tokyo, Japan; Venue: Musashino Forest Sport Plaza; Level: Super 750; Prize: $700,000; Format: 32MS/32WS/32MD/32WD/32XD	Score: 21–15, 21-12	
11–16 September	Japan Open (Report): Host: Tokyo, Japan; Venue: Musashino Forest Sport Plaza; Level: Super 750; Prize: $700,000; Format: 32MS/32WS/32MD/32WD/32XD	(China) Zheng Siwei (China) Huang Yaqiong	(China) Wang Yilyu (China) Huang Dongping
11–16 September	Japan Open (Report): Host: Tokyo, Japan; Venue: Musashino Forest Sport Plaza; Level: Super 750; Prize: $700,000; Format: 32MS/32WS/32MD/32WD/32XD	Score: 21–19, 21–8	
18–23 September	China Open (Report): Host: Changzhou, China; Venue: Changzhou Olympic Sports Centre; Level: Super 1000; Prize: $1,000,000; Format: 32MS/32WS/32MD/32WD/32XD	(Indonesia) Anthony Sinisuka Ginting	(Japan) Kento Momota
18–23 September	China Open (Report): Host: Changzhou, China; Venue: Changzhou Olympic Sports Centre; Level: Super 1000; Prize: $1,000,000; Format: 32MS/32WS/32MD/32WD/32XD	Score: 23–21, 21–19	
18–23 September	China Open (Report): Host: Changzhou, China; Venue: Changzhou Olympic Sports Centre; Level: Super 1000; Prize: $1,000,000; Format: 32MS/32WS/32MD/32WD/32XD	(Spain) Carolina Marín	(China) Chen Yufei
18–23 September	China Open (Report): Host: Changzhou, China; Venue: Changzhou Olympic Sports Centre; Level: Super 1000; Prize: $1,000,000; Format: 32MS/32WS/32MD/32WD/32XD	Score: 21–18, 21–13	
18–23 September	China Open (Report): Host: Changzhou, China; Venue: Changzhou Olympic Sports Centre; Level: Super 1000; Prize: $1,000,000; Format: 32MS/32WS/32MD/32WD/32XD	(Denmark) Kim Astrup (Denmark) Anders Skaarup Rasmussen	(China) Han Chengkai (China) Zhou Haodong
18–23 September	China Open (Report): Host: Changzhou, China; Venue: Changzhou Olympic Sports Centre; Level: Super 1000; Prize: $1,000,000; Format: 32MS/32WS/32MD/32WD/32XD	Score: 21–13, 17–21, 21–14	
18–23 September	China Open (Report): Host: Changzhou, China; Venue: Changzhou Olympic Sports Centre; Level: Super 1000; Prize: $1,000,000; Format: 32MS/32WS/32MD/32WD/32XD	(Japan) Misaki Matsutomo (Japan) Ayaka Takahashi	(Japan) Mayu Matsumoto (Japan) Wakana Nagahara
18–23 September	China Open (Report): Host: Changzhou, China; Venue: Changzhou Olympic Sports Centre; Level: Super 1000; Prize: $1,000,000; Format: 32MS/32WS/32MD/32WD/32XD	Score: 21–16, 21–12	
18–23 September	China Open (Report): Host: Changzhou, China; Venue: Changzhou Olympic Sports Centre; Level: Super 1000; Prize: $1,000,000; Format: 32MS/32WS/32MD/32WD/32XD	(China) Zheng Siwei (China) Huang Yaqiong	(China) Zhang Nan (China) Li Yinhui
18–23 September	China Open (Report): Host: Changzhou, China; Venue: Changzhou Olympic Sports Centre; Level: Super 1000; Prize: $1,000,000; Format: 32MS/32WS/32MD/32WD/32XD	Score: 21–16, 21–9	
18–23 September	Bangka Belitung Indonesia Masters (Report): Host: Pangkal Pinang, Indonesia; Venue: Sahabudin Sports Hall; Level: Super 100; Prize: $75,000; Format: 64MS/32WS/32MD/32WD/32XD	(Indonesia) Ihsan Maulana Mustofa	(Chinese Taipei) Lin Yu-hsien
18–23 September	Bangka Belitung Indonesia Masters (Report): Host: Pangkal Pinang, Indonesia; Venue: Sahabudin Sports Hall; Level: Super 100; Prize: $75,000; Format: 64MS/32WS/32MD/32WD/32XD	Score: 21–17, 23–21	
18–23 September	Bangka Belitung Indonesia Masters (Report): Host: Pangkal Pinang, Indonesia; Venue: Sahabudin Sports Hall; Level: Super 100; Prize: $75,000; Format: 64MS/32WS/32MD/32WD/32XD	(Japan) Minatsu Mitani	(Japan) Shiori Saito
18–23 September	Bangka Belitung Indonesia Masters (Report): Host: Pangkal Pinang, Indonesia; Venue: Sahabudin Sports Hall; Level: Super 100; Prize: $75,000; Format: 64MS/32WS/32MD/32WD/32XD	Score: 21–16, 21–12	
18–23 September	Bangka Belitung Indonesia Masters (Report): Host: Pangkal Pinang, Indonesia; Venue: Sahabudin Sports Hall; Level: Super 100; Prize: $75,000; Format: 64MS/32WS/32MD/32WD/32XD	(Chinese Taipei) Chang Ko-chi (Chinese Taipei) Lu Chia-pin	(South Korea) Ko Sung-hyun (South Korea) Shin Baek-cheol
18–23 September	Bangka Belitung Indonesia Masters (Report): Host: Pangkal Pinang, Indonesia; Venue: Sahabudin Sports Hall; Level: Super 100; Prize: $75,000; Format: 64MS/32WS/32MD/32WD/32XD	Score: 23–21, 21–13	
18–23 September	Bangka Belitung Indonesia Masters (Report): Host: Pangkal Pinang, Indonesia; Venue: Sahabudin Sports Hall; Level: Super 100; Prize: $75,000; Format: 64MS/32WS/32MD/32WD/32XD	(Japan) Ayako Sakuramoto (Japan) Yukiko Takahata	(Japan) Nami Matsuyama (Japan) Chiharu Shida
18–23 September	Bangka Belitung Indonesia Masters (Report): Host: Pangkal Pinang, Indonesia; Venue: Sahabudin Sports Hall; Level: Super 100; Prize: $75,000; Format: 64MS/32WS/32MD/32WD/32XD	Score: 11–21, 21–19, 22–20	
18–23 September	Bangka Belitung Indonesia Masters (Report): Host: Pangkal Pinang, Indonesia; Venue: Sahabudin Sports Hall; Level: Super 100; Prize: $75,000; Format: 64MS/32WS/32MD/32WD/32XD	(Indonesia) Rinov Rivaldy (Indonesia) Pitha Haningtyas Mentari	(Thailand) Nipitphon Phuangphuapet (Thailand) Savitree Amitrapai
18–23 September	Bangka Belitung Indonesia Masters (Report): Host: Pangkal Pinang, Indonesia; Venue: Sahabudin Sports Hall; Level: Super 100; Prize: $75,000; Format: 64MS/32WS/32MD/32WD/32XD	Score: 21–19, 21–18	
25–30 September	Korea Open (Report): Host: Seoul, South Korea; Venue: SK Olympic Handball Gymnasium; Level: Super 500; Prize: $600,000; Format: 32MS/32WS/32MD/32WD/32XD	(Chinese Taipei) Chou Tien-chen	(Indonesia) Tommy Sugiarto
25–30 September	Korea Open (Report): Host: Seoul, South Korea; Venue: SK Olympic Handball Gymnasium; Level: Super 500; Prize: $600,000; Format: 32MS/32WS/32MD/32WD/32XD	Score: 21–13, 21–16	
25–30 September	Korea Open (Report): Host: Seoul, South Korea; Venue: SK Olympic Handball Gymnasium; Level: Super 500; Prize: $600,000; Format: 32MS/32WS/32MD/32WD/32XD	(Japan) Nozomi Okuhara	(United States) Beiwen Zhang
25–30 September	Korea Open (Report): Host: Seoul, South Korea; Venue: SK Olympic Handball Gymnasium; Level: Super 500; Prize: $600,000; Format: 32MS/32WS/32MD/32WD/32XD	Score: 21–10, 17–21, 21–16	
25–30 September	Korea Open (Report): Host: Seoul, South Korea; Venue: SK Olympic Handball Gymnasium; Level: Super 500; Prize: $600,000; Format: 32MS/32WS/32MD/32WD/32XD	(Japan) Hiroyuki Endo (Japan) Yuta Watanabe	(Japan) Takuro Hoki (Japan) Yugo Kobayashi
25–30 September	Korea Open (Report): Host: Seoul, South Korea; Venue: SK Olympic Handball Gymnasium; Level: Super 500; Prize: $600,000; Format: 32MS/32WS/32MD/32WD/32XD	Score: 9–21, 21–15, 21–10	
25–30 September	Korea Open (Report): Host: Seoul, South Korea; Venue: SK Olympic Handball Gymnasium; Level: Super 500; Prize: $600,000; Format: 32MS/32WS/32MD/32WD/32XD	(Japan) Misaki Matsutomo (Japan) Ayaka Takahashi	(Japan) Yuki Fukushima (Japan) Sayaka Hirota
25–30 September	Korea Open (Report): Host: Seoul, South Korea; Venue: SK Olympic Handball Gymnasium; Level: Super 500; Prize: $600,000; Format: 32MS/32WS/32MD/32WD/32XD	Score: 21–11, 21–18	
25–30 September	Korea Open (Report): Host: Seoul, South Korea; Venue: SK Olympic Handball Gymnasium; Level: Super 500; Prize: $600,000; Format: 32MS/32WS/32MD/32WD/32XD	(China) He Jiting (China) Du Yue	(Denmark) Mathias Christiansen (Denmark) Christinna Pedersen
25–30 September	Korea Open (Report): Host: Seoul, South Korea; Venue: SK Olympic Handball Gymnasium; Level: Super 500; Prize: $600,000; Format: 32MS/32WS/32MD/32WD/32XD	Score: 21–18, 21–16	

=== October ===
Date	Tournament	Champions	Runners-up
2–7 October	Chinese Taipei Open (Report): Host: Taipei, Taiwan; Venue: Taipei Arena; Level: Super 300; Prize: $500,000; Format: 32MS/32WS/32MD/32WD/32XD	(Malaysia) Lee Zii Jia	(Japan) Riichi Takeshita
2–7 October	Chinese Taipei Open (Report): Host: Taipei, Taiwan; Venue: Taipei Arena; Level: Super 300; Prize: $500,000; Format: 32MS/32WS/32MD/32WD/32XD	Score: 21–17, 16–21, 21–11	
2–7 October	Chinese Taipei Open (Report): Host: Taipei, Taiwan; Venue: Taipei Arena; Level: Super 300; Prize: $500,000; Format: 32MS/32WS/32MD/32WD/32XD	(Chinese Taipei) Tai Tzu-ying	(Denmark) Line Kjærsfeldt
2–7 October	Chinese Taipei Open (Report): Host: Taipei, Taiwan; Venue: Taipei Arena; Level: Super 300; Prize: $500,000; Format: 32MS/32WS/32MD/32WD/32XD	Score: 17–21, 21–10, 21–13	
2–7 October	Chinese Taipei Open (Report): Host: Taipei, Taiwan; Venue: Taipei Arena; Level: Super 300; Prize: $500,000; Format: 32MS/32WS/32MD/32WD/32XD	(Chinese Taipei) Chen Hung-ling (Chinese Taipei) Wang Chi-lin	(Chinese Taipei) Liao Min-chun (Chinese Taipei) Su Ching-heng
2–7 October	Chinese Taipei Open (Report): Host: Taipei, Taiwan; Venue: Taipei Arena; Level: Super 300; Prize: $500,000; Format: 32MS/32WS/32MD/32WD/32XD	Score: 22–20, 21–9	
2–7 October	Chinese Taipei Open (Report): Host: Taipei, Taiwan; Venue: Taipei Arena; Level: Super 300; Prize: $500,000; Format: 32MS/32WS/32MD/32WD/32XD	(Japan) Nami Matsuyama (Japan) Chiharu Shida	(Japan) Ayane Kurihara (Japan) Naru Shinoya
2–7 October	Chinese Taipei Open (Report): Host: Taipei, Taiwan; Venue: Taipei Arena; Level: Super 300; Prize: $500,000; Format: 32MS/32WS/32MD/32WD/32XD	Score: 21–10, 21–17	
2–7 October	Chinese Taipei Open (Report): Host: Taipei, Taiwan; Venue: Taipei Arena; Level: Super 300; Prize: $500,000; Format: 32MS/32WS/32MD/32WD/32XD	(Indonesia) Alfian Eko Prasetya (Indonesia) Marsheilla Gischa Islami	(Chinese Taipei) Yang Po-hsuan (Chinese Taipei) Wu Ti-jung
2–7 October	Chinese Taipei Open (Report): Host: Taipei, Taiwan; Venue: Taipei Arena; Level: Super 300; Prize: $500,000; Format: 32MS/32WS/32MD/32WD/32XD	Score: 21–15, 21–11	
9–14 October	Dutch Open (Report): Host: Almere, Netherlands; Venue: Topsportcentrum; Level: Super 100; Prize: $75,000; Format: 64MS/32WS/32MD/32WD/32XD	(India) Sourabh Verma	(Malaysia) Cheam June Wei
9–14 October	Dutch Open (Report): Host: Almere, Netherlands; Venue: Topsportcentrum; Level: Super 100; Prize: $75,000; Format: 64MS/32WS/32MD/32WD/32XD	Score: 21–19, 21–13	
9–14 October	Dutch Open (Report): Host: Almere, Netherlands; Venue: Topsportcentrum; Level: Super 100; Prize: $75,000; Format: 64MS/32WS/32MD/32WD/32XD	(Denmark) Mia Blichfeldt	(China) Qi Xuefei
9–14 October	Dutch Open (Report): Host: Almere, Netherlands; Venue: Topsportcentrum; Level: Super 100; Prize: $75,000; Format: 64MS/32WS/32MD/32WD/32XD	Score: 21–16, 21–18	
9–14 October	Dutch Open (Report): Host: Almere, Netherlands; Venue: Topsportcentrum; Level: Super 100; Prize: $75,000; Format: 64MS/32WS/32MD/32WD/32XD	(Indonesia) Wahyu Nayaka Arya Pankaryanira (Indonesia) Ade Yusuf Santoso	(Netherlands) Jelle Maas (Netherlands) Robin Tabeling
9–14 October	Dutch Open (Report): Host: Almere, Netherlands; Venue: Topsportcentrum; Level: Super 100; Prize: $75,000; Format: 64MS/32WS/32MD/32WD/32XD	Score: 21–19, 17–21, 21–11	
9–14 October	Dutch Open (Report): Host: Almere, Netherlands; Venue: Topsportcentrum; Level: Super 100; Prize: $75,000; Format: 64MS/32WS/32MD/32WD/32XD	(Bulgaria) Gabriela Stoeva (Bulgaria) Stefani Stoeva	(Netherlands) Selena Piek (Netherlands) Cheryl Seinen
9–14 October	Dutch Open (Report): Host: Almere, Netherlands; Venue: Topsportcentrum; Level: Super 100; Prize: $75,000; Format: 64MS/32WS/32MD/32WD/32XD	Score: 21–17, 21–18	
9–14 October	Dutch Open (Report): Host: Almere, Netherlands; Venue: Topsportcentrum; Level: Super 100; Prize: $75,000; Format: 64MS/32WS/32MD/32WD/32XD	(England) Marcus Ellis (England) Lauren Smith	(France) Thom Gicquel (France) Delphine Delrue
9–14 October	Dutch Open (Report): Host: Almere, Netherlands; Venue: Topsportcentrum; Level: Super 100; Prize: $75,000; Format: 64MS/32WS/32MD/32WD/32XD	Score: 21–15, 21–15	
16–21 October	Denmark Open (Report): Host: Odense, Denmark; Venue: Odense Sports Park; Level: Super 750; Prize: $775,000; Format: 32MS/32WS/32MD/32WD/32XD	(Japan) Kento Momota	(Chinese Taipei) Chou Tien-chen
16–21 October	Denmark Open (Report): Host: Odense, Denmark; Venue: Odense Sports Park; Level: Super 750; Prize: $775,000; Format: 32MS/32WS/32MD/32WD/32XD	Score: 22–20, 16–21, 21–15	
16–21 October	Denmark Open (Report): Host: Odense, Denmark; Venue: Odense Sports Park; Level: Super 750; Prize: $775,000; Format: 32MS/32WS/32MD/32WD/32XD	(Chinese Taipei) Tai Tzu-ying	(India) Saina Nehwal
16–21 October	Denmark Open (Report): Host: Odense, Denmark; Venue: Odense Sports Park; Level: Super 750; Prize: $775,000; Format: 32MS/32WS/32MD/32WD/32XD	Score: 21–13, 13–21, 21–6	
16–21 October	Denmark Open (Report): Host: Odense, Denmark; Venue: Odense Sports Park; Level: Super 750; Prize: $775,000; Format: 32MS/32WS/32MD/32WD/32XD	(Indonesia) Marcus Fernaldi Gideon (Indonesia) Kevin Sanjaya Sukamuljo	(Japan) Takeshi Kamura (Japan) Keigo Sonoda
16–21 October	Denmark Open (Report): Host: Odense, Denmark; Venue: Odense Sports Park; Level: Super 750; Prize: $775,000; Format: 32MS/32WS/32MD/32WD/32XD	Score: 21–15, 21–16	
16–21 October	Denmark Open (Report): Host: Odense, Denmark; Venue: Odense Sports Park; Level: Super 750; Prize: $775,000; Format: 32MS/32WS/32MD/32WD/32XD	(Japan) Yuki Fukushima (Japan) Sayaka Hirota	(Japan) Shiho Tanaka (Japan) Koharu Yonemoto
16–21 October	Denmark Open (Report): Host: Odense, Denmark; Venue: Odense Sports Park; Level: Super 750; Prize: $775,000; Format: 32MS/32WS/32MD/32WD/32XD	Score: 21–19, 21–16	
16–21 October	Denmark Open (Report): Host: Odense, Denmark; Venue: Odense Sports Park; Level: Super 750; Prize: $775,000; Format: 32MS/32WS/32MD/32WD/32XD	(China) Zheng Siwei (China) Huang Yaqiong	(Thailand) Dechapol Puavaranukroh (Thailand) Sapsiree Taerattanachai
16–21 October	Denmark Open (Report): Host: Odense, Denmark; Venue: Odense Sports Park; Level: Super 750; Prize: $775,000; Format: 32MS/32WS/32MD/32WD/32XD	Score: 21–16, 21–13	
23–28 October	French Open (Report): Host: Paris, France; Venue: Stade Pierre de Coubertin; Level: Super 750; Prize: $750,000; Format: 32MS/32WS/32MD/32WD/32XD	(China) Chen Long	(China) Shi Yuqi
23–28 October	French Open (Report): Host: Paris, France; Venue: Stade Pierre de Coubertin; Level: Super 750; Prize: $750,000; Format: 32MS/32WS/32MD/32WD/32XD	Score: 21–17, 21–19	
23–28 October	French Open (Report): Host: Paris, France; Venue: Stade Pierre de Coubertin; Level: Super 750; Prize: $750,000; Format: 32MS/32WS/32MD/32WD/32XD	(Japan) Akane Yamaguchi	(Chinese Taipei) Tai Tzu-ying
23–28 October	French Open (Report): Host: Paris, France; Venue: Stade Pierre de Coubertin; Level: Super 750; Prize: $750,000; Format: 32MS/32WS/32MD/32WD/32XD	Score: 22–20, 17–21, 21–13	
23–28 October	French Open (Report): Host: Paris, France; Venue: Stade Pierre de Coubertin; Level: Super 750; Prize: $750,000; Format: 32MS/32WS/32MD/32WD/32XD	(China) Han Chengkai (China) Zhou Haodong	(Indonesia) Marcus Fernaldi Gideon (Indonesia) Kevin Sanjaya Sukamuljo
23–28 October	French Open (Report): Host: Paris, France; Venue: Stade Pierre de Coubertin; Level: Super 750; Prize: $750,000; Format: 32MS/32WS/32MD/32WD/32XD	Score: 23–21, 8–21, 21–17	
23–28 October	French Open (Report): Host: Paris, France; Venue: Stade Pierre de Coubertin; Level: Super 750; Prize: $750,000; Format: 32MS/32WS/32MD/32WD/32XD	(Japan) Mayu Matsumoto (Japan) Wakana Nagahara	(Bulgaria) Gabriela Stoeva (Bulgaria) Stefani Stoeva
23–28 October	French Open (Report): Host: Paris, France; Venue: Stade Pierre de Coubertin; Level: Super 750; Prize: $750,000; Format: 32MS/32WS/32MD/32WD/32XD	Score: 21–14, 21–19	
23–28 October	French Open (Report): Host: Paris, France; Venue: Stade Pierre de Coubertin; Level: Super 750; Prize: $750,000; Format: 32MS/32WS/32MD/32WD/32XD	(China) Zheng Siwei (China) Huang Yaqiong	(South Korea) Seo Seung-jae (South Korea) Chae Yoo-jung
23–28 October	French Open (Report): Host: Paris, France; Venue: Stade Pierre de Coubertin; Level: Super 750; Prize: $750,000; Format: 32MS/32WS/32MD/32WD/32XD	Score: 21–19, 21–14	
30 Oct – 4 Nov	Macau Open (Report): Host: Macau; Venue: Tap Seac Multisport Pavilion; Level: Super 300; Prize: $150,000; Format: 32MS/32WS/32MD/32WD/32XD	(South Korea) Lee Hyun-il	(China) Zhou Zeqi
30 Oct – 4 Nov	Macau Open (Report): Host: Macau; Venue: Tap Seac Multisport Pavilion; Level: Super 300; Prize: $150,000; Format: 32MS/32WS/32MD/32WD/32XD	Score: 21–9, 21–19	
30 Oct – 4 Nov	Macau Open (Report): Host: Macau; Venue: Tap Seac Multisport Pavilion; Level: Super 300; Prize: $150,000; Format: 32MS/32WS/32MD/32WD/32XD	(Canada) Michelle Li	(China) Han Yue
30 Oct – 4 Nov	Macau Open (Report): Host: Macau; Venue: Tap Seac Multisport Pavilion; Level: Super 300; Prize: $150,000; Format: 32MS/32WS/32MD/32WD/32XD	Score: 23–25, 21–17, 21–15	
30 Oct – 4 Nov	Macau Open (Report): Host: Macau; Venue: Tap Seac Multisport Pavilion; Level: Super 300; Prize: $150,000; Format: 32MS/32WS/32MD/32WD/32XD	(South Korea) Kim Gi-jung (South Korea) Lee Yong-dae	(South Korea) Ko Sung-hyun (South Korea) Shin Baek-cheol
30 Oct – 4 Nov	Macau Open (Report): Host: Macau; Venue: Tap Seac Multisport Pavilion; Level: Super 300; Prize: $150,000; Format: 32MS/32WS/32MD/32WD/32XD	Score: 17–21, 21–13, 21–19	
30 Oct – 4 Nov	Macau Open (Report): Host: Macau; Venue: Tap Seac Multisport Pavilion; Level: Super 300; Prize: $150,000; Format: 32MS/32WS/32MD/32WD/32XD	(Malaysia) Vivian Hoo (Malaysia) Yap Cheng Wen	(Japan) Misato Aratama (Japan) Akane Watanabe
30 Oct – 4 Nov	Macau Open (Report): Host: Macau; Venue: Tap Seac Multisport Pavilion; Level: Super 300; Prize: $150,000; Format: 32MS/32WS/32MD/32WD/32XD	Score: 21–15, 22–20	
30 Oct – 4 Nov	Macau Open (Report): Host: Macau; Venue: Tap Seac Multisport Pavilion; Level: Super 300; Prize: $150,000; Format: 32MS/32WS/32MD/32WD/32XD	(Hong Kong) Tang Chun Man (Hong Kong) Tse Ying Suet	(Hong Kong) Lee Chun Hei (Hong Kong) Chau Hoi Wah
30 Oct – 4 Nov	Macau Open (Report): Host: Macau; Venue: Tap Seac Multisport Pavilion; Level: Super 300; Prize: $150,000; Format: 32MS/32WS/32MD/32WD/32XD	Score: 21–14, 21–15	
30 Oct – 4 Nov	SaarLorLux Open (Report): Host: Saarbrücken, Germany; Venue: Saarlandhalle; Level: Super 100; Prize: $75,000; Format: 64MS/32WS/32MD/32WD/32XD	(India) Subhankar Dey	(England) Rajiv Ouseph
30 Oct – 4 Nov	SaarLorLux Open (Report): Host: Saarbrücken, Germany; Venue: Saarlandhalle; Level: Super 100; Prize: $75,000; Format: 64MS/32WS/32MD/32WD/32XD	Score: 21–11, 21–14	
30 Oct – 4 Nov	SaarLorLux Open (Report): Host: Saarbrücken, Germany; Venue: Saarlandhalle; Level: Super 100; Prize: $75,000; Format: 64MS/32WS/32MD/32WD/32XD	(China) Cai Yanyan	(China) Chen Xiaoxin
30 Oct – 4 Nov	SaarLorLux Open (Report): Host: Saarbrücken, Germany; Venue: Saarlandhalle; Level: Super 100; Prize: $75,000; Format: 64MS/32WS/32MD/32WD/32XD	Score: 21–19, 19–21, 21–17	
30 Oct – 4 Nov	SaarLorLux Open (Report): Host: Saarbrücken, Germany; Venue: Saarlandhalle; Level: Super 100; Prize: $75,000; Format: 64MS/32WS/32MD/32WD/32XD	(England) Marcus Ellis (England) Chris Langridge	(Malaysia) Aaron Chia (Malaysia) Soh Wooi Yik
30 Oct – 4 Nov	SaarLorLux Open (Report): Host: Saarbrücken, Germany; Venue: Saarlandhalle; Level: Super 100; Prize: $75,000; Format: 64MS/32WS/32MD/32WD/32XD	Score: 21–23, 21–18, 21–19	
30 Oct – 4 Nov	SaarLorLux Open (Report): Host: Saarbrücken, Germany; Venue: Saarlandhalle; Level: Super 100; Prize: $75,000; Format: 64MS/32WS/32MD/32WD/32XD	(Bulgaria) Gabriela Stoeva (Bulgaria) Stefani Stoeva	(Indonesia) Ni Ketut Mahadewi Istarani (Indonesia) Rizki Amelia Pradipta
30 Oct – 4 Nov	SaarLorLux Open (Report): Host: Saarbrücken, Germany; Venue: Saarlandhalle; Level: Super 100; Prize: $75,000; Format: 64MS/32WS/32MD/32WD/32XD	Score: 22–20, 15–21, 21–19	
30 Oct – 4 Nov	SaarLorLux Open (Report): Host: Saarbrücken, Germany; Venue: Saarlandhalle; Level: Super 100; Prize: $75,000; Format: 64MS/32WS/32MD/32WD/32XD	(England) Marcus Ellis (England) Lauren Smith	(China) Lu Kai (China) Chen Lu
30 Oct – 4 Nov	SaarLorLux Open (Report): Host: Saarbrücken, Germany; Venue: Saarlandhalle; Level: Super 100; Prize: $75,000; Format: 64MS/32WS/32MD/32WD/32XD	Score: 19–21, 21–18, 21–10	

=== November ===
Date	Tournament	Champions	Runners-up
6–11 November	Fuzhou China Open (Report): Host: Fuzhou, China; Venue: Haixia Olympic Center Stadium; Level: Super 750; Prize: $700,000; Format: 32MS/32WS/32MD/32WD/32XD	(Japan) Kento Momota	(Chinese Taipei) Chou Tien-chen
6–11 November	Fuzhou China Open (Report): Host: Fuzhou, China; Venue: Haixia Olympic Center Stadium; Level: Super 750; Prize: $700,000; Format: 32MS/32WS/32MD/32WD/32XD	Score: 21–13, 11–21, 21–16	
6–11 November	Fuzhou China Open (Report): Host: Fuzhou, China; Venue: Haixia Olympic Center Stadium; Level: Super 750; Prize: $700,000; Format: 32MS/32WS/32MD/32WD/32XD	(China) Chen Yufei	(Japan) Nozomi Okuhara
6–11 November	Fuzhou China Open (Report): Host: Fuzhou, China; Venue: Haixia Olympic Center Stadium; Level: Super 750; Prize: $700,000; Format: 32MS/32WS/32MD/32WD/32XD	Score: 21–10, 21–16	
6–11 November	Fuzhou China Open (Report): Host: Fuzhou, China; Venue: Haixia Olympic Center Stadium; Level: Super 750; Prize: $700,000; Format: 32MS/32WS/32MD/32WD/32XD	(Indonesia) Marcus Fernaldi Gideon (Indonesia) Kevin Sanjaya Sukamuljo	(China) He Jiting (China) Tan Qiang
6–11 November	Fuzhou China Open (Report): Host: Fuzhou, China; Venue: Haixia Olympic Center Stadium; Level: Super 750; Prize: $700,000; Format: 32MS/32WS/32MD/32WD/32XD	Score: 25–27, 21–17, 21–15	
6–11 November	Fuzhou China Open (Report): Host: Fuzhou, China; Venue: Haixia Olympic Center Stadium; Level: Super 750; Prize: $700,000; Format: 32MS/32WS/32MD/32WD/32XD	(South Korea) Lee So-hee (South Korea) Shin Seung-chan	(Japan) Mayu Matsumoto (Japan) Wakana Nagahara
6–11 November	Fuzhou China Open (Report): Host: Fuzhou, China; Venue: Haixia Olympic Center Stadium; Level: Super 750; Prize: $700,000; Format: 32MS/32WS/32MD/32WD/32XD	Score: 23–21, 21–18	
6–11 November	Fuzhou China Open (Report): Host: Fuzhou, China; Venue: Haixia Olympic Center Stadium; Level: Super 750; Prize: $700,000; Format: 32MS/32WS/32MD/32WD/32XD	(China) Zheng Siwei (China) Huang Yaqiong	(China) Wang Yilyu (China) Huang Dongping
6–11 November	Fuzhou China Open (Report): Host: Fuzhou, China; Venue: Haixia Olympic Center Stadium; Level: Super 750; Prize: $700,000; Format: 32MS/32WS/32MD/32WD/32XD	Score: 21–15, 11–21, 21–19	
13–18 November	Hong Kong Open (Report): Host: Kowloon, Hong Kong; Venue: Hong Kong Coliseum; Level: Super 500; Prize: $400,000; Format: 32MS/32WS/32MD/32WD/32XD	(South Korea) Son Wan-ho	(Japan) Kenta Nishimoto
13–18 November	Hong Kong Open (Report): Host: Kowloon, Hong Kong; Venue: Hong Kong Coliseum; Level: Super 500; Prize: $400,000; Format: 32MS/32WS/32MD/32WD/32XD	Score: 14–21, 21–17, 21–13	
13–18 November	Hong Kong Open (Report): Host: Kowloon, Hong Kong; Venue: Hong Kong Coliseum; Level: Super 500; Prize: $400,000; Format: 32MS/32WS/32MD/32WD/32XD	(Japan) Nozomi Okuhara	(Thailand) Ratchanok Intanon
13–18 November	Hong Kong Open (Report): Host: Kowloon, Hong Kong; Venue: Hong Kong Coliseum; Level: Super 500; Prize: $400,000; Format: 32MS/32WS/32MD/32WD/32XD	Score: 21–19, 24–22	
13–18 November	Hong Kong Open (Report): Host: Kowloon, Hong Kong; Venue: Hong Kong Coliseum; Level: Super 500; Prize: $400,000; Format: 32MS/32WS/32MD/32WD/32XD	(Indonesia) Marcus Fernaldi Gideon (Indonesia) Kevin Sanjaya Sukamuljo	(Japan) Takeshi Kamura (Japan) Keigo Sonoda
13–18 November	Hong Kong Open (Report): Host: Kowloon, Hong Kong; Venue: Hong Kong Coliseum; Level: Super 500; Prize: $400,000; Format: 32MS/32WS/32MD/32WD/32XD	Score: 21–13, 21–12	
13–18 November	Hong Kong Open (Report): Host: Kowloon, Hong Kong; Venue: Hong Kong Coliseum; Level: Super 500; Prize: $400,000; Format: 32MS/32WS/32MD/32WD/32XD	(Japan) Yuki Fukushima (Japan) Sayaka Hirota	(South Korea) Lee So-hee (South Korea) Shin Seung-chan
13–18 November	Hong Kong Open (Report): Host: Kowloon, Hong Kong; Venue: Hong Kong Coliseum; Level: Super 500; Prize: $400,000; Format: 32MS/32WS/32MD/32WD/32XD	Score: 21–18, 21–17	
13–18 November	Hong Kong Open (Report): Host: Kowloon, Hong Kong; Venue: Hong Kong Coliseum; Level: Super 500; Prize: $400,000; Format: 32MS/32WS/32MD/32WD/32XD	(Japan) Yuta Watanabe (Japan) Arisa Higashino	(China) Wang Yilyu (China) Huang Dongping
13–18 November	Hong Kong Open (Report): Host: Kowloon, Hong Kong; Venue: Hong Kong Coliseum; Level: Super 500; Prize: $400,000; Format: 32MS/32WS/32MD/32WD/32XD	Score: 21–18, 21–14	
20–25 November	Syed Modi International (Report): Host: Lucknow, India; Venue: Babu Banarasi Das Indoor Stadium; Level: Super 300; Prize: $150,000; Format: 32MS/32WS/32MD/32WD/32XD	(India) Sameer Verma	(China) Lu Guangzu
20–25 November	Syed Modi International (Report): Host: Lucknow, India; Venue: Babu Banarasi Das Indoor Stadium; Level: Super 300; Prize: $150,000; Format: 32MS/32WS/32MD/32WD/32XD	Score: 16–21, 21–19, 21–14	
20–25 November	Syed Modi International (Report): Host: Lucknow, India; Venue: Babu Banarasi Das Indoor Stadium; Level: Super 300; Prize: $150,000; Format: 32MS/32WS/32MD/32WD/32XD	(China) Han Yue	(India) Saina Nehwal
20–25 November	Syed Modi International (Report): Host: Lucknow, India; Venue: Babu Banarasi Das Indoor Stadium; Level: Super 300; Prize: $150,000; Format: 32MS/32WS/32MD/32WD/32XD	Score: 21–18, 21–8	
20–25 November	Syed Modi International (Report): Host: Lucknow, India; Venue: Babu Banarasi Das Indoor Stadium; Level: Super 300; Prize: $150,000; Format: 32MS/32WS/32MD/32WD/32XD	(Indonesia) Fajar Alfian (Indonesia) Muhammad Rian Ardianto	(India) Satwiksairaj Rankireddy (India) Chirag Shetty
20–25 November	Syed Modi International (Report): Host: Lucknow, India; Venue: Babu Banarasi Das Indoor Stadium; Level: Super 300; Prize: $150,000; Format: 32MS/32WS/32MD/32WD/32XD	Score: 21–11, 22–20	
20–25 November	Syed Modi International (Report): Host: Lucknow, India; Venue: Babu Banarasi Das Indoor Stadium; Level: Super 300; Prize: $150,000; Format: 32MS/32WS/32MD/32WD/32XD	(Malaysia) Chow Mei Kuan (Malaysia) Lee Meng Yean	(India) Ashwini Ponnappa (India) N. Sikki Reddy
20–25 November	Syed Modi International (Report): Host: Lucknow, India; Venue: Babu Banarasi Das Indoor Stadium; Level: Super 300; Prize: $150,000; Format: 32MS/32WS/32MD/32WD/32XD	Score: 21–15, 21–13	
20–25 November	Syed Modi International (Report): Host: Lucknow, India; Venue: Babu Banarasi Das Indoor Stadium; Level: Super 300; Prize: $150,000; Format: 32MS/32WS/32MD/32WD/32XD	(China) Ou Xuanyi (China) Feng Xueying	(Indonesia) Rinov Rivaldy (Indonesia) Pitha Haningtyas Mentari
20–25 November	Syed Modi International (Report): Host: Lucknow, India; Venue: Babu Banarasi Das Indoor Stadium; Level: Super 300; Prize: $150,000; Format: 32MS/32WS/32MD/32WD/32XD	Score: 22–20, 21–10	
20–25 November	Scottish Open (Report): Host: Glasgow, Scotland; Venue: Emirates Arena; Level: Super 100; Prize: $75,000; Format: 64MS/32WS/32MD/32WD/32XD	(China) Liu Haichao	(China) Sun Feixiang
20–25 November	Scottish Open (Report): Host: Glasgow, Scotland; Venue: Emirates Arena; Level: Super 100; Prize: $75,000; Format: 64MS/32WS/32MD/32WD/32XD	Score: 21–17, 22–20	
20–25 November	Scottish Open (Report): Host: Glasgow, Scotland; Venue: Emirates Arena; Level: Super 100; Prize: $75,000; Format: 64MS/32WS/32MD/32WD/32XD	(Scotland) Kirsty Gilmour	(Denmark) Line Kjærsfeldt
20–25 November	Scottish Open (Report): Host: Glasgow, Scotland; Venue: Emirates Arena; Level: Super 100; Prize: $75,000; Format: 64MS/32WS/32MD/32WD/32XD	Score: 21–16, 18–21, 21–18	
20–25 November	Scottish Open (Report): Host: Glasgow, Scotland; Venue: Emirates Arena; Level: Super 100; Prize: $75,000; Format: 64MS/32WS/32MD/32WD/32XD	(England) Marcus Ellis (England) Chris Langridge	(Denmark) David Daugaard (Denmark) Frederik Søgaard
20–25 November	Scottish Open (Report): Host: Glasgow, Scotland; Venue: Emirates Arena; Level: Super 100; Prize: $75,000; Format: 64MS/32WS/32MD/32WD/32XD	Score: 23–21, 21–16	
20–25 November	Scottish Open (Report): Host: Glasgow, Scotland; Venue: Emirates Arena; Level: Super 100; Prize: $75,000; Format: 64MS/32WS/32MD/32WD/32XD	(Bulgaria) Gabriela Stoeva (Bulgaria) Stefani Stoeva	(France) Émilie Lefel (France) Anne Tran
20–25 November	Scottish Open (Report): Host: Glasgow, Scotland; Venue: Emirates Arena; Level: Super 100; Prize: $75,000; Format: 64MS/32WS/32MD/32WD/32XD	Score: 21–16, 21–9	
20–25 November	Scottish Open (Report): Host: Glasgow, Scotland; Venue: Emirates Arena; Level: Super 100; Prize: $75,000; Format: 64MS/32WS/32MD/32WD/32XD	(England) Marcus Ellis (England) Lauren Smith	(Netherlands) Jacco Arends (Netherlands) Selena Piek
20–25 November	Scottish Open (Report): Host: Glasgow, Scotland; Venue: Emirates Arena; Level: Super 100; Prize: $75,000; Format: 64MS/32WS/32MD/32WD/32XD	Score: 13–6 Retired	
27 Nov – 2 Dec	Korea Masters (Report): Host: Gwangju, South Korea; Venue: Gwangju Women's University Stadium; Level: Super 300; Prize: $250,000; Format: 32MS/32WS/32MD/32WD/32XD	(South Korea) Son Wan-ho	(Malaysia) Lee Zii Jia
27 Nov – 2 Dec	Korea Masters (Report): Host: Gwangju, South Korea; Venue: Gwangju Women's University Stadium; Level: Super 300; Prize: $250,000; Format: 32MS/32WS/32MD/32WD/32XD	Score: 21–16, 21–11	
27 Nov – 2 Dec	Korea Masters (Report): Host: Gwangju, South Korea; Venue: Gwangju Women's University Stadium; Level: Super 300; Prize: $250,000; Format: 32MS/32WS/32MD/32WD/32XD	(China) Li Xuerui	(China) Han Yue
27 Nov – 2 Dec	Korea Masters (Report): Host: Gwangju, South Korea; Venue: Gwangju Women's University Stadium; Level: Super 300; Prize: $250,000; Format: 32MS/32WS/32MD/32WD/32XD	Score: 21–10, 21–18	
27 Nov – 2 Dec	Korea Masters (Report): Host: Gwangju, South Korea; Venue: Gwangju Women's University Stadium; Level: Super 300; Prize: $250,000; Format: 32MS/32WS/32MD/32WD/32XD	(South Korea) Choi Sol-gyu (South Korea) Seo Seung-jae	(Chinese Taipei) Po Li-wei (Chinese Taipei) Wang Chi-lin
27 Nov – 2 Dec	Korea Masters (Report): Host: Gwangju, South Korea; Venue: Gwangju Women's University Stadium; Level: Super 300; Prize: $250,000; Format: 32MS/32WS/32MD/32WD/32XD	Score: 21–12, 17–21, 21–18	
27 Nov – 2 Dec	Korea Masters (Report): Host: Gwangju, South Korea; Venue: Gwangju Women's University Stadium; Level: Super 300; Prize: $250,000; Format: 32MS/32WS/32MD/32WD/32XD	(South Korea) Chang Ye-na (South Korea) Jung Kyung-eun	(South Korea) Lee So-hee (South Korea) Shin Seung-chan
27 Nov – 2 Dec	Korea Masters (Report): Host: Gwangju, South Korea; Venue: Gwangju Women's University Stadium; Level: Super 300; Prize: $250,000; Format: 32MS/32WS/32MD/32WD/32XD	Score: 21–14, 21–17	
27 Nov – 2 Dec	Korea Masters (Report): Host: Gwangju, South Korea; Venue: Gwangju Women's University Stadium; Level: Super 300; Prize: $250,000; Format: 32MS/32WS/32MD/32WD/32XD	(South Korea) Ko Sung-hyun (South Korea) Eom Hye-won	(South Korea) Choi Sol-gyu (South Korea) Shin Seung-chan
27 Nov – 2 Dec	Korea Masters (Report): Host: Gwangju, South Korea; Venue: Gwangju Women's University Stadium; Level: Super 300; Prize: $250,000; Format: 32MS/32WS/32MD/32WD/32XD	Score: 21–12, 15–21, 21–18	

=== December ===
Date	Tournament	Champions	Runners-up
12–16 December	BWF World Tour Finals (Report): Host: Guangzhou, China; Venue: Tianhe Gymnasium; Level: World Tour Finals; Prize: $1,500,000	(China) Shi Yuqi	(Japan) Kento Momota
12–16 December	BWF World Tour Finals (Report): Host: Guangzhou, China; Venue: Tianhe Gymnasium; Level: World Tour Finals; Prize: $1,500,000	Score: 21–12, 21–11	
12–16 December	BWF World Tour Finals (Report): Host: Guangzhou, China; Venue: Tianhe Gymnasium; Level: World Tour Finals; Prize: $1,500,000	(India) P. V. Sindhu	(Japan) Nozomi Okuhara
12–16 December	BWF World Tour Finals (Report): Host: Guangzhou, China; Venue: Tianhe Gymnasium; Level: World Tour Finals; Prize: $1,500,000	Score: 21–19, 21–17	
12–16 December	BWF World Tour Finals (Report): Host: Guangzhou, China; Venue: Tianhe Gymnasium; Level: World Tour Finals; Prize: $1,500,000	(China) Li Junhui (China) Liu Yuchen	(Japan) Hiroyuki Endo (Japan) Yuta Watanabe
12–16 December	BWF World Tour Finals (Report): Host: Guangzhou, China; Venue: Tianhe Gymnasium; Level: World Tour Finals; Prize: $1,500,000	Score: 21–15, 21–11	
12–16 December	BWF World Tour Finals (Report): Host: Guangzhou, China; Venue: Tianhe Gymnasium; Level: World Tour Finals; Prize: $1,500,000	(Japan) Misaki Matsutomo (Japan) Ayaka Takahashi	(South Korea) Lee So-hee (South Korea) Shin Seung-chan
12–16 December	BWF World Tour Finals (Report): Host: Guangzhou, China; Venue: Tianhe Gymnasium; Level: World Tour Finals; Prize: $1,500,000	Score: 21–12, 22–20	
12–16 December	BWF World Tour Finals (Report): Host: Guangzhou, China; Venue: Tianhe Gymnasium; Level: World Tour Finals; Prize: $1,500,000	(China) Wang Yilyu (China) Huang Dongping	(China) Zheng Siwei (China) Huang Yaqiong
12–16 December	BWF World Tour Finals (Report): Host: Guangzhou, China; Venue: Tianhe Gymnasium; Level: World Tour Finals; Prize: $1,500,000	Score: 23–21, 16–21, 21–18	

== Statistics ==
=== Performance by countries ===
Below are the 2018 BWF World Tour performances by countries. Only countries who have won a title are listed:

==== BWF World Tour ====
No	Team	THA	MAS	INA	IND	SUI	GER	ENG	NZL	AUS	USA	MAS	INA	THA	SGP	ESP	JPN	CHN	KOR	TPE	DEN	FRA	MAC	CHN	HKG	IND	KOR	BWTF	Total
1	Japan			1		2	3	1	2	1		2	2	3	2	2	2	1	3	1	2	2		1	3			1	37
2	China			1	1			1	1	2	3	1					1	1	1		1	3		2		2	1	3	25
3	Indonesia	1	1	2	2			1		1			2	2	1		1	1		1	1			1	1	1			20
4	Chinese Taipei			1			1	1	2			1	1		1				1	2	1								12
5	South Korea									1	1					1							2	1	1		4		11
6	Denmark		2		1	1		1								2		1											8
6	Malaysia	1					1				1	1			1					1			1			1			8
8	Thailand	3	1																										4
9	India					1																				1		1	3
10	Hong Kong		1																				1						2
10	Spain																1	1											2
12	Canada																						1						1
12	Germany					1																							1
12	United States				1																								1

==== BWF Tour Super 100 ====
No	Team	FRA	CHN	CAN	JPN	RUS	VIE	IND	INA	NED	GER	SCO	Total
1	Japan	1		1	3	1	1		2				9
2	China		4	2							1	1	8
3	England			2						1	2	2	7
4	Indonesia				1		1	1	2	1			6
5	India					1		2		1	1		5
6	Bulgaria	1								1	1	1	4
7	South Korea					0.5	1	1					2.5
8	Chinese Taipei		1						1				2
8	Denmark	1								1			2
8	Malaysia					2							2
8	Thailand				1		1						2
12	Germany	1											1
12	Hong Kong							1					1
12	Netherlands	1											1
12	Scotland											1	1
12	Singapore						1						1
17	Russia					0.5							0.5

=== Finalists in six or more World Tour tournaments ===
Updated after 2018 BWF World Tour Finals.

Rank	Player	Events					Total
Rank	Player	MS	WS	MD	WD	XD	Total
1	(China) Huang Yaqiong					10	10
1	(China) Zheng Siwei					10	10
3	(England) Marcus Ellis			3		6	9
3	(Indonesia) Kevin Sanjaya Sukamuljo			9			9
3	(Indonesia) Marcus Fernaldi Gideon			9			9
6	(Chinese Taipei) Tai Tzu-ying		8				8
6	(Japan) Ayako Sakuramoto				8		8
6	(Japan) Yukiko Takahata				8		8
9	(Japan) Sayaka Hirota				7		7
9	(Japan) Yuki Fukushima				7		7
9	(Japan) Kento Momota	7					7
12	(Bulgaria) Gabriela Stoeva				6		6
12	(Bulgaria) Stefani Stoeva				6		6
12	(China) Huang Dongping				4	2	6
12	(Chinese Taipei) Chou Tien-chen	6					6
12	(England) Lauren Smith					6	6
12	(Japan) Nozomi Okuhara		6				6
12	(Japan) Yuta Watanabe			4		2	6
12	(Japan) Ayaka Takahashi				6		6
12	(Japan) Misaki Matsutomo				6		6

=== Titles in four or more World Tour tournaments ===
Updated after 2018 BWF World Tour Finals.

Rank	Player	Events					Total
Rank	Player	MS	WS	MD	WD	XD	Total
1	(Indonesia) Kevin Sanjaya Sukamuljo			8			8
1	(Indonesia) Marcus Fernaldi Gideon			8			8
3	(China) Huang Yaqiong					7	7
3	(China) Zheng Siwei					7	7
3	(England) Marcus Ellis			3		4	7
3	(Japan) Ayako Sakuramoto				7		7
3	(Japan) Yukiko Takahata				7		7
8	(Chinese Taipei) Tai Tzu-ying		6				6
9	(Japan) Sayaka Hirota				5		5
9	(Japan) Yuki Fukushima				5		5
9	(Japan) Ayaka Takahashi				5		5
9	(Japan) Misaki Matsutomo				5		5
13	(Bulgaria) Gabriela Stoeva				4		4
13	(Bulgaria) Stefani Stoeva				4		4
13	(England) Lauren Smith					4	4
13	(Japan) Kento Momota	4					4
13	(Japan) Sayaka Takahashi		4				4

== World Tour Finals rankings ==
The points were calculated from the following levels:

- BWF World Tour Super 1000,
- BWF World Tour Super 750,
- BWF World Tour Super 500,
- BWF World Tour Super 300 (except Korea Masters),
- BWF Tour Super 100.

=== Men's singles ===
Rankings (Men's Singles) as of 29 November 2018
#			Player	TP	Points
1	Steady	(Chinese Taipei)	Chou Tien-chen	16	96,890
2	Steady	(Japan)	Kento Momota	10	86,370
3	Steady	(Indonesia)	Tommy Sugiarto	17	78,000
4	Steady	(China)	Shi Yuqi	11	73,540
5	Steady	(South Korea)	Son Wan-ho	13	67,900
6	Steady	(Thailand)	Kantaphon Wangcharoen	17	66,680
7	▲5	(India)	Sameer Verma	16	66,620
8	▼1	(Indonesia)	Anthony Sinisuka Ginting	13	66,610

=== Women's singles ===
Rankings (Women's Singles) as of 29 November 2018
#			Player	TP	Points
1	Steady	(Chinese Taipei)	Tai Tzu-ying	11	93,090
2	Steady	(Japan)	Nozomi Okuhara	13	90,730
3	Steady	(Japan)	Akane Yamaguchi	13	86,860
4	Steady	(China)	Chen Yufei	12	79,340
5	Steady	(Thailand)	Ratchanok Intanon	11	76,210
6	Steady	(India)	P. V. Sindhu	12	72,620
7	Steady	(Spain)	Carolina Marín	11	70,550
8	Steady	(Canada)	Michelle Li	20	70,180

=== Men's doubles ===
Rankings (Men's Doubles) as of 29 November 2018
#			Player	TP	Points
1	Steady	(Indonesia)	Marcus Fernaldi Gideon	11	108,400
1	Steady	(Indonesia)	Kevin Sanjaya Sukamuljo	11	108,400
2	Steady	(Chinese Taipei)	Chen Hung-ling	17	80,410
2	Steady	(Chinese Taipei)	Wang Chi-lin	17	80,410
3	Steady	(Chinese Taipei)	Liao Min-chun	17	77,120
3	Steady	(Chinese Taipei)	Su Ching-heng	17	77,120
4	Steady	(China)	Han Chengkai	16	75,440
4	Steady	(China)	Zhou Haodong	16	75,440
5	▲2	(Denmark)	Kim Astrup	15	68,920
5	▲2	(Denmark)	Anders Skaarup Rasmussen	15	68,920
6	▼1	(Indonesia)	Mohammad Ahsan	12	67,900
6	▼1	(Indonesia)	Hendra Setiawan	12	67,900
7	▲1	(Japan)	Hiroyuki Endo	15	67,890
7	▲1	(Japan)	Yuta Watanabe	15	67,890
8	▼2	(Japan)	Takeshi Kamura	13	67,600
8	▼2	(Japan)	Keigo Sonoda	13	67,600

=== Women's doubles ===
Rankings (Women's Doubles) as of 29 November 2018
#			Player	TP	Points
1	▲1	(Japan)	Misaki Matsutomo	14	96,680
1	▲1	(Japan)	Ayaka Takahashi	14	96,680
2	▼1	(Japan)	Yuki Fukushima	13	95,900
2	▼1	(Japan)	Sayaka Hirota	13	95,900
3	Steady	(Japan)	Mayu Matsumoto	13	85,960
3	Steady	(Japan)	Wakana Nagahara	13	85,960
4	Steady	(Indonesia)	Greysia Polii	11	79,770
4	Steady	(Indonesia)	Apriyani Rahayu	11	79,770
5	Steady	(Thailand)	Jongkolphan Kititharakul	15	79,660
5	Steady	(Thailand)	Rawinda Prajongjai	15	79,660
6	Steady	(South Korea)	Lee So-hee	13	70,870
6	Steady	(South Korea)	Shin Seung-chan	13	70,870
7	▲2	(Bulgaria)	Gabriela Stoeva	13	70,710
7	▲2	(Bulgaria)	Stefani Stoeva	13	70,710
8	▼1	(China)	Chen Qingchen	12	67,410
8	▼1	(China)	Jia Yifan	12	67,410

=== Mixed doubles ===
Rankings (Mixed Doubles) as of 29 November 2018
#			Player	TP	Points
1	Steady	(China)	Zheng Siwei	11	104,820
1	Steady	(China)	Huang Yaqiong	11	104,820
2	Steady	(Japan)	Yuta Watanabe	14	83,970
2	Steady	(Japan)	Arisa Higashino	14	83,970
3	Steady	(Thailand)	Dechapol Puavaranukroh	14	81,060
3	Steady	(Thailand)	Sapsiree Taerattanachai	14	81,060
4	Steady	(Malaysia)	Chan Peng Soon	16	76,340
4	Steady	(Malaysia)	Goh Liu Ying	16	76,340
5	Steady	(China)	Wang Yilyu	11	75,080
5	Steady	(China)	Huang Dongping	11	75,080
6	Steady	(Indonesia)	Hafiz Faizal	17	73,590
6	Steady	(Indonesia)	Gloria Emanuelle Widjaja	17	73,590
7	Steady	(Malaysia)	Goh Soon Huat	11	72,270
7	Steady	(Malaysia)	Shevon Jemie Lai	11	72,270
8	▲8	(England)	Marcus Ellis	14	65,310
8	▲8	(England)	Lauren Smith	14	65,310
