= 2010 East Asian Judo Championships =

Judo competition

Judo Judo
- Location: Macau, China
- Dates: 19-20 June 2010

Competition at external databases
- Links: JudoInside

The 2010 East Asian Judo Championships was contested in seven weight classes, seven each for men and women.

This competition was held at Tap Seac Multi-sports Pavilion in Macau, China, 19 and 20 June.

== Medal overview ==
=== Men ===
Event	Gold	Silver	Bronze
Extra-lightweight (60 kg)	Jin-Min Jang (KOR)	Takeshi Matsuki (JPN)	Wong Kin Wai (MAC)
Extra-lightweight (60 kg)	Jin-Min Jang (KOR)	Takeshi Matsuki (JPN)	Li Hui (CHN)
Half-lightweight (66 kg)	Shogo Maeno (JPN)	Tu Kai Wen (TPE)	Cho Jun-Ho (KOR)
Half-lightweight (66 kg)	Shogo Maeno (JPN)	Tu Kai Wen (TPE)	De Gejirihu (CHN)
Lightweight (73 kg)	Bang Gui-Man (KOR)	Ryo Saito (JPN)	Huang Chun-ta (TPE)
Lightweight (73 kg)	Bang Gui-Man (KOR)	Ryo Saito (JPN)	E. Ridundaobu (CHN)
Half-middleweight (81 kg)	Song Dae-Nam (KOR)	Wu Chen-ying (TPE)	Kazushi Nishioka (JPN)
Half-middleweight (81 kg)	Song Dae-Nam (KOR)	Wu Chen-ying (TPE)	Gao Haiyuan (CHN)
Middleweight (90 kg)	Tseng Han Chieh (TPE)	Taigo Nishida (JPN)	Zheng Jizhao (CHN)
Middleweight (90 kg)	Tseng Han Chieh (TPE)	Taigo Nishida (JPN)	Tsang Tin Lun (HKG)
Half-heavyweight (100 kg)	Hwang Hee-Tae (KOR)	Daisuke Kobayashi (JPN)	Wu Mingchao (CHN)
Half-heavyweight (100 kg)	Hwang Hee-Tae (KOR)	Daisuke Kobayashi (JPN)	Huang Kao Cheng (TPE)
Heavyweight (+100 kg)	Kim Soo-Whan (KOR)	Ryuta Ishii (JPN)	Lin Yu Heng (TPE)
Heavyweight (+100 kg)	Kim Soo-Whan (KOR)	Ryuta Ishii (JPN)	Chan Ion Peng (MAC)

=== Women ===
Event	Gold	Silver	Bronze
(48 kg)	Hiromi Endo (JPN)	Wu Chao (CHN)	Kim Mi-Ri (KOR)
(48 kg)	Hiromi Endo (JPN)	Wu Chao (CHN)	Hsieh Pei Ling (TPE)
Half-lightweight (52 kg)	Nanami Morimoto (JPN)	Kim Kyung-Ok (KOR)	Lien Pei Ju (TPE)
Half-lightweight (52 kg)	Nanami Morimoto (JPN)	Kim Kyung-Ok (KOR)	Yong Chi Leng (MAC)
Lightweight (57 kg)	Aiko Sato (JPN)	Kim Jan-Di (KOR)	Hsiao Hui Shan (TPE)
Lightweight (57 kg)	Aiko Sato (JPN)	Kim Jan-Di (KOR)	Liang Ruiyi (CHN)
Half-middleweight (63 kg)	Wang Chin Fang (TPE)	Kana Abe (JPN)	Joung Da-Woon (KOR)
Half-middleweight (63 kg)	Wang Chin Fang (TPE)	Kana Abe (JPN)	Wang Weili (CHN)
Middleweight (70 kg)	Hwang Ye-Seul (KOR)	Asuka Oka (JPN)	Tang Quixia (CHN)
Middleweight (70 kg)	Hwang Ye-Seul (KOR)	Asuka Oka (JPN)	Huang Shih Han (TPE)
Half-heavyweight (78 kg)	Sayaka Anai (JPN)	Jeong Gyeong-Mi (KOR)	Wang Szu Chu (TPE)
Half-heavyweight (78 kg)	Sayaka Anai (JPN)	Jeong Gyeong-Mi (KOR)	Chao Mei Pou (MAC)
Middleweight (+78 kg)	Miku Eboshi (JPN)	Kim Na-Young (KOR)	Huang Tzu Chin (TPE)
Middleweight (+78 kg)	Miku Eboshi (JPN)	Kim Na-Young (KOR)	Dai Mengying (CHN)

== Medals table ==
Rank	Nation	Gold	Silver	Bronze	Total
1	Japan	6	7	1	14
2	South Korea	6	4	3	13
3	Chinese Taipei	2	2	9	13
4	China	0	1	10	11
5	Macau	0	0	4	4
6	Hong Kong	0	0	1	1
Totals (6 entries)		14	14	28	56
