= 2014 East Asian Judo Championships =

Judo competition in Ulaanbaatar, Mongolia

Judo 2014 East Asian Judo Championships
- Location: Ulaanbaatar, Mongolia
- Dates: 9-10 May 2014

The 2014 East Asian Judo Championships was contested in seven weight classes, seven each for men and women. Also participated nations contested in men's and women's team competitions.

This competition was held in Ulaanbaatar, Mongolia, 9 and 10 May.

== Medal overview ==
=== Medals table ===
Rank	Nation	Gold	Silver	Bronze	Total
1	Japan	7	4	3	14
2	Mongolia	5	4	13	22
3	South Korea	3	5	3	11
4	North Korea	1	2	1	4
5	China	0	1	2	3
6	Chinese Taipei	0	0	3	3
Totals (6 entries)		16	16	25	57

== Team competition ==
Men's team			Women's team		
Gold	Silver	Bronze	Gold	Silver	Bronze
Mongolia	Japan	South Korea	Japan	South Korea	Mongolia; North Korea

=== Men ===
- Chinese Taipei
- Japan
- Mongolia
- South Korea

=== Women ===
- China
- Chinese Taipei
- Japan
- Mongolia
- North Korea
- South Korea

== Participated nations ==
- China
- Chinese Taipei
- Guam
- Hong Kong
- Japan
- Macau
- Mongolia
- North Korea
- South Korea
