= Tap Seac Multi-sports Pavilion =

Sports venue in Macau

Coordinates: 22.196525°N 113.546877°E

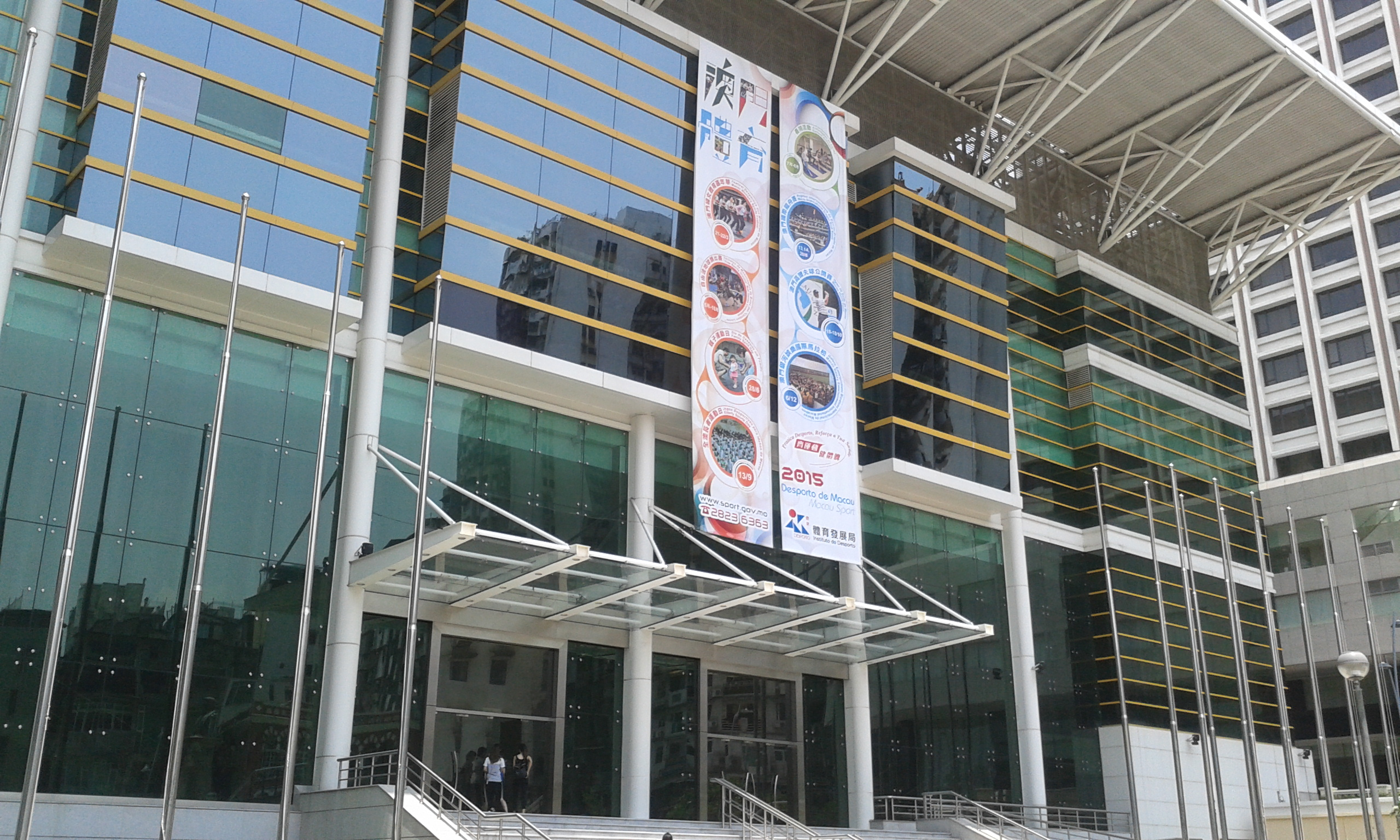
- Tap Seac Multi-sports Pavilion

Chinese name
- Traditional Chinese: 塔石體育館
- Simplified Chinese: 塔石体育馆
Transcriptions
Standard Mandarin
- Hanyu Pinyin: Tǎ Shí Tǐyùguǎn
Yue: Cantonese
- Jyutping: taap3 sek6 tai2 juk6 gun2

Portuguese name
- Portuguese: Pavilhão Polidesportivo Tap Seac

The Tap Seac Multi-sports Pavilion (Chinese: 塔石體育館; Portuguese: Pavilhão Polidesportivo Tap Seac) is an indoor sporting arena located in São Lázaro, Macau, China.

The land on which the Tap Seac Multi-sport Pavilion sits at present belongs to the Ho-Tung Primary School. It acts as a substitute for the Tap Seac Football Ground which was formerly located diagonally across the road and was demolished to make way for the new Tap Seac Plaza and Pedestrian Zone. The pavilion covers a total area of more than 5,500 square metres and offers a seating capacity of over 4,000. Apart from the main playing area there is also a warm-up hall which provides facilities for basketball training. It is suitable for a variety of indoor sports such as aerobics, gymnastics, and basketball.

The venue was officially opened in 2004. It was one of the venues for the 2005 East Asian Games, the 2006 Lusophony Games and the 2007 Asian Indoor Games.

== Notable events ==
- 2010 East Asian Judo Championships
- Macau Open Badminton Championships

== See also ==
- Sports in Macau
