= 2018 Vietnam Open (badminton) =

Tournament details
- Dates: 7–12 August
- Level: Super 100
- Total prize money: US$75,000
- Venue: Nguyen Du Cultural Sports Club
- Location: Ho Chi Minh City, Vietnam

Champions
- Men's singles: (Indonesia) Shesar Hiren Rhustavito
- Women's singles: (Singapore) Yeo Jia Min
- Men's doubles: (South Korea) Ko Sung-hyun (South Korea) Shin Baek-cheol
- Women's doubles: (Japan) Misato Aratama (Japan) Akane Watanabe
- Mixed doubles: (Thailand) Nipitphon Phuangphuapet (Thailand) Savitree Amitrapai

The 2018 Vietnam Open (officially known as the Yonex-Sunrise Vietnam Open 2018 for sponsorship reasons) was a badminton tournament which took place at Nguyen Du Cultural Sports Club in Vietnam from 7 to 12 August 2018 and had a total purse of $75,000.

== Tournament ==
The 2018 Vietnam Open was the sixth Super 100 tournament of the 2018 BWF World Tour and also part of the Vietnam Open championships which had been held since 1996. This tournament was organized by the Ho Chi Minh City Badminton Association with the sanction from the BWF.

=== Venue ===
This international tournament was held at Nguyen Du Cultural Sports Club in Ho Chi Minh City, Vietnam.

=== Point distribution ===
Below is the point distribution table for each phase of the tournament based on the BWF points system for the BWF Tour Super 100 event.

| Winner | Runner-up | 3/4 | 5/8 | 9/16 | 17/32 | 33/64 | 65/128 | 129/256 |
|---|---|---|---|---|---|---|---|---|
| 5,500 | 4,680 | 3,850 | 3,030 | 2,110 | 1,290 | 510 | 240 | 100 |

=== Prize money ===
The total prize money for this tournament was US$75,000. Distribution of prize money was in accordance with BWF regulations.

| Event | Winner | Finals | Semi-finals | Quarter-finals | Last 16 |
| Singles | $5,625 | $2,850 | $1,087.50 | $450 | $262.50 |
| Doubles | $5,925 | $2,850 | $1,050 | $543.75 | $281.25 |

== Men's singles ==
=== Seeds ===
1. (Brazil) Ygor Coelho (third round)
2. (Malaysia) Liew Daren (withdrew)
3. (Spain) Pablo Abián (second round)
4. (Russia) Vladimir Malkov (third round)
5. (China) Lu Guangzu (withdrew)
6. (Malaysia) Chong Wei Feng (third round)
7. (Japan) Yu Igarashi (semi-finals)
8. (Thailand) Sitthikom Thammasin (third round)

=== Finals ===
Semi-finals
(India) Ajay Jayaram | 21 | 21
7 | (Japan) Yu Igarashi | 14 | 19
(Indonesia) Shesar Hiren Rhustavito | 21 | 19 | 21
(India) Mithun Manjunath | 17 | 21 | 14

Final
(India) Ajay Jayaram | 14 | 10
(Indonesia) Shesar Hiren Rhustavito | 21 | 21

=== Top half ===
==== Section 1 ====
First Round
Q5 | (India) S Verma | 21 | 21
(India) S Jaiswal | 17 | 16
(Vietnam) Lê Đ P | 19 | 12
(India) A Jayaram | 21 | 21
(India) A Yeligar | 15 | 21 | 19
(Mauritius) J Paul | 21 | 10 | 21
Q8 | (Indonesia) F I Hadmadi | 12 | 19
(Russia) S Sirant | 21 | 21

Second Round
1 | (Brazil) Y Coelho | 22 | 17 | 21
Q5 | (India) S Verma | 20 | 21 | 17
Q2 | (Indonesia) G P F Cupu | 7 | 16
(India) A Jayaram | 21 | 21
PFQ | (India) K Jindal | 9 | 21 | 21
(Mauritius) J Paul | 21 | 16 | 16
(Canada) XD Sheng | 22 | 21
(Russia) S Sirant | 20 | 19

Third Round
1 | (Brazil) Y Coelho | 20 | 14
(India) A Jayaram | 22 | 21
PFQ | (India) K Jindal | 10 | 22
(Canada) XD Sheng | 21 | 24

Quarter-finals
(India) A Jayaram | 26 | 21
(Canada) XD Sheng | 24 | 17

==== Section 2 ====
First Round
PFQ | (Japan) M Koga | 19 | 21 | 21
(Singapore) R Ng | 21 | 10 | 9
PFQ | (Chinese Taipei) Hsueh H-y | 21 | 14 | 21
(Japan) R Takeshita | 15 | 21 | 10
(Malaysia) Lim C W | 21 | 13 | 15
(Indonesia) F A Kholik | 13 | 21 | 21
Q4 | (Malaysia) J Karupathevan | 12 | 2^{r}
(Chinese Taipei) Lin Y-h | 21 | 16

Second Round
4 | (Russia) V Malkov | 21 | 19 | 21
PFQ | (Japan) M Koga | 19 | 21 | 15
(Vietnam) Phạm C C | 14 | 14
PFQ | (Chinese Taipei) Hsueh H-y | 21 | 21
7 | (Japan) Y Igarashi | 12 | 21 | 21
(Indonesia) F A Kholik | 21 | 14 | 19
(Thailand) P Thongnuam | 18 | 22
(Chinese Taipei) Lin Y-h | 21 | 24

Third Round
4 | (Russia) V Malkov | 18 | 12
PFQ | (Chinese Taipei) Hsueh H-y | 21 | 21
7 | (Japan) Y Igarashi | 21 | 21
(Chinese Taipei) Lin Y-h | 13 | 18

Quarter-finals
PFQ | (Chinese Taipei) Hsueh H-y | 17 | 14
7 | (Japan) Y Igarashi | 21 | 21

=== Bottom half ===
==== Section 3 ====
First Round
(Vietnam) Nguyễn T M | 21 | 21
PFQ | (Indonesia) K H Wibowo | 14 | 16
(Malaysia) Goh G C | 21 | 21
Q7 | (Chinese Taipei) Shih K-c | 19 | 12
(Chinese Taipei) Lu C-h | 15 | 21 | 21
(India) S Pratap Singh | 21 | 12 | 16
(India) K Gulshan Kumar | 14 | 14
(Indonesia) S H Rhustavito | 21 | 21

Second Round
(Vietnam) Nguyễn T M | 21 | 21
PFR | (Australia) D Fan | 14 | 8
(Malaysia) Goh G C | 16 | 13
8 | (Thailand) S Thammasin | 21 | 21
(Chinese Taipei) Lu C-h | 21 | 21
Q3 | (Malaysia) Yeoh S Z | 19 | 18
(Indonesia) S H Rhustavito | 21 | 21
3 | (Spain) P Abián | 11 | 11

Third Round
(Vietnam) Nguyễn T M | 23 | 21
8 | (Thailand) S Thammasin | 21 | 11
(Chinese Taipei) Lu C-h | 12 | 12
(Indonesia) S H Rhustavito | 21 | 21

Quarter-finals
(Vietnam) Nguyễn T M | 21 | 10 | 16
(Indonesia) S H Rhustavito | 17 | 21 | 21

==== Section 4 ====
First Round
(China) Zhou ZQ | 21 | 17 | 21
(Chinese Taipei) Lin C-h | 15 | 21 | 10
(Malaysia) Cheam J W | 19 | 18
(Thailand) K Leelavechabutr | 21 | 21
(India) M Manjunath | 11 | 21 | 21
Q6 | (Japan) R Maruo | 21 | 14 | 15
(Thailand) A Namkul | 21 | 21
(India) B Joshi | 16 | 15

Second Round
(China) Zhou ZQ | 21 | 19 | 21
(Malaysia) Soong J V | 17 | 21 | 18
(Thailand) K Leelavechabutr | 8 | 19
6 | (Malaysia) Chong W F | 21 | 21
(India) M Manjunath | 21 | 21
Q1 | (Thailand) S Jamsri | 19 | 12
(Thailand) A Namkul | 21 | 14 | 21
PFQ | (Indonesia) A Marteen | 19 | 21 | 16

Third Round
(China) Zhou ZQ | 10 | 21 | 21
6 | (Malaysia) Chong W F | 21 | 12 | 18
(India) M Manjunath | 18 | 21 | 21
(Thailand) A Namkul | 21 | 13 | 19

Quarter-finals
(China) Zhou ZQ | 21 | 19 | 11
(India) M Manjunath | 17 | 21 | 21

== Women's singles ==
=== Seeds ===
1. (Japan) Sayaka Takahashi (second round)
2. (Japan) Minatsu Mitani (semi-finals)
3. (Malaysia) Lee Ying Ying (second round)
4. (China) Cai Yanyan (withdrew)
5. (Canada) Brittney Tam (first round)
6. (Chinese Taipei) Sung Shuo-yun (second round)
7. (China) Han Yue (final)
8. (Vietnam) Vũ Thị Trang (quarter-finals)

=== Finals ===
Semi-finals
7 | (China) Han Yue | 21 | 22
(Thailand) Phittayaporn Chaiwan | 11 | 20
PFQ | (Singapore) Yeo Jia Min | 21 | 12 | 21
2 | (Japan) Minatsu Mitani | 19 | 21 | 13

Final
7 | (China) Han Yue | 19 | 19
PFQ | (Singapore) Yeo Jia Min | 21 | 21

=== Top half ===
==== Section 1 ====
First Round
1 | (Japan) S Takahashi | 21 | 21
(Thailand) T Poopradubsil | 11 | 7
Q3 | (Malaysia) Ho Y M | 21 | 21
(India) R Raje | 16 | 13
7 | (China) Han Y | 21 | 21
(India) M Agrey | 13 | 12
(United States) C Pan | 21 | 21
(India) V Choudhari | 14 | 13

Second Round
1 | (Japan) S Takahashi | 17 | 21 | 19
Q3 | (Malaysia) Ho Y M | 21 | 11 | 21
7 | (China) Han Y | 13 | 21 | 21
(United States) C Pan | 21 | 7 | 11

Quarter-finals
Q3 | (Malaysia) Ho Y M | 22 | 15 | 11
7 | (China) Han Y | 20 | 21 | 21

==== Section 2 ====
First Round
3 | (Malaysia) Lee Y Y | 21 | 21
Q4 | (Chinese Taipei) Lin Y-c | 12 | 14
(Vietnam) Nguyễn T L | 17 | 21 | 16
(Thailand) P Chaiwan | 21 | 13 | 21
6 | (Chinese Taipei) Sung S-y | 15 | 21 | 21
(Malaysia) T Muralitharan | 21 | 9 | 18
Q1 | (India) R Das | 21 | 21
(Japan) S Saito | 13 | 14

Second Round
3 | (Malaysia) Lee Y Y | 15 | 11
(Thailand) P Chaiwan | 21 | 21
6 | (Chinese Taipei) Sung S-y | 8 | 14
Q1 | (India) R Das | 21 | 21

Quarter-finals
(Thailand) P Chaiwan | 21 | 21
Q1 | (India) R Das | 19 | 14

=== Bottom half ===
==== Section 3 ====
First Round
PFQ | (Singapore) Yeo J M | 23 | 21 | 21
(Indonesia) Y Y Susanto | 25 | 16 | 15
(Thailand) C Jucharoen | 26 | 13 | 21
5 | (Canada) B Tam | 24 | 21 | 11
(Japan) A Takahashi | 21 | 21
(Chinese Taipei) Chen S-y | 17 | 16
(Hong Kong) Deng X | 21 | 21
PFQ | (Indonesia) R A Riodingin | 13 | 12

Second Round
PFQ | (Singapore) Yeo J M | 21 | 21
(Thailand) C Jucharoen | 14 | 15
(Japan) A Takahashi | 19 | 19
(Hong Kong) Deng X | 21 | 21

Quarter-finals
PFQ | (Singapore) Yeo J M | 21 | 21
(Hong Kong) Deng X | 18 | 15

==== Section 4 ====
First Round
(United States) J Gai | 11 | 13
(Thailand) P Buranaprasertsuk | 21 | 21
(Japan) A Mine | 22 | 21 | 11
8 | (Vietnam) Vũ T T | 24 | 18 | 21
(Malaysia) Lim Y F | 21 | 21
(India) G R Shivani | 19 | 17
Q2 | (Thailand) S Katethong | 15 | 20
2 | (Japan) M Mitani | 21 | 22

Second Round
(Thailand) P Buranaprasertsuk | 21 | 20 | 8
8 | (Vietnam) Vũ T T | 18 | 22 | 21
(Malaysia) Lim Y F | 16 | 10
2 | (Japan) M Mitani | 21 | 21

Quarter-finals
8 | (Vietnam) Vũ T T | 17 | 19
2 | (Japan) M Mitani | 21 | 21

== Men's doubles ==
=== Seeds ===
1. (Malaysia) Aaron Chia / Soh Wooi Yik (quarter-finals)
2. (Thailand) Inkarat Apisuk / Tanupat Viriyangkura (second round)
3. (Malaysia) Shia Chun Kang / Tan Wee Gieen (second round)
4. (Chinese Taipei) Po Li-wei / Yang Ming-tse (first round)
5. (Indonesia) Angga Pratama / Rian Agung Saputro (withdrew)
6. (Japan) Keiichiro Matsui / Yoshinori Takeuchi (quarter-finals)
7. (Japan) Hiroki Okamura / Masayuki Onodera (second round)
8. (Malaysia) Tan Boon Heong / (South Korea) Yoo Yeon-seong (second round)

=== Finals ===
Semi-finals
(Malaysia) Mohamad Arif Abdul Latif (Malaysia) Nur Mohd Azriyn Ayub | 12 | 18
Q4 | (South Korea) Ko Sung-hyun (South Korea) Shin Baek-cheol | 21 | 21
(Chinese Taipei) Lin Shang-kai (Chinese Taipei) Tseng Min-hao | 20 | 12
(Chinese Taipei) Lee Sheng-mu (Chinese Taipei) Yang Po-hsuan | 22 | 21

Final
Q4 | (South Korea) Ko Sung-hyun (South Korea) Shin Baek-cheol | 22 | 21
(Chinese Taipei) Lee Sheng-mu (Chinese Taipei) Yang Po-hsuan | 20 | 18

=== Top half ===
==== Section 1 ====
First Round
1 | (Malaysia) A Chia (Malaysia) Soh W Y | 21 | 21
(Indonesia) R N Kusharjanto (Indonesia) R Rivaldy | 14 | 11
(Chinese Taipei) Lin Y-s (Chinese Taipei) Su L-w | 21 | 24
(Malaysia) Lee J Y (Malaysia) Lim Z T | 9 | 22
PFQ | (Thailand) N Phuangphuapet (Thailand) N Yordphaisong | 21 | 21
(Chinese Taipei) Chang E-c (Chinese Taipei) Chen X-y | 14 | 18
Q3 | (Philippines) P G Magnaye (Philippines) A Morada | 16 | 18
(Malaysia) M A A Latif (Malaysia) N M A Ayub | 21 | 21

Second Round
1 | (Malaysia) A Chia (Malaysia) Soh W Y | 15 | 22 | 21
(Chinese Taipei) Lin Y-s (Chinese Taipei) Su L-w | 21 | 20 | 14
PFQ | (Thailand) N Phuangphuapet (Thailand) N Yordphaisong | 17 | 16
(Malaysia) M A A Latif (Malaysia) N M A Ayub | 21 | 21

Quarter-finals
1 | (Malaysia) A Chia (Malaysia) Soh W Y | 15 | 18
(Malaysia) M A A Latif (Malaysia) N M A Ayub | 21 | 21

==== Section 2 ====
First Round
4 | (Chinese Taipei) Po L-w (Chinese Taipei) Yang M-t | 14 | 14
Q4 | (South Korea) Ko S-h (South Korea) Shin B-c | 21 | 21
Q1 | (Malaysia) Low H Y (Malaysia) Ng E C | 20 | 17
PFQ | (Japan) A Koga (Japan) T Saito | 22 | 21
6 | (Japan) K Matsui (Japan) Y Takeuchi | 21 | 21
(Chinese Taipei) Chen C-t (Chinese Taipei) Chi Y-j | 8 | 16
(Malaysia) M Amar Mohd Sani (Malaysia) M Amir Mohd Sani | 23 | 19 | 14
(China) Guo RH (China) Jiang ZB | 21 | 21 | 21

Second Round
Q4 | (South Korea) Ko S-h (South Korea) Shin B-c | 21 | 21
PFQ | (Japan) A Koga (Japan) T Saito | 12 | 18
6 | (Japan) K Matsui (Japan) Y Takeuchi | 21 | 21
(China) Guo RH (China) Jiang ZB | 18 | 17

Quarter-finals
Q4 | (South Korea) Ko S-h (South Korea) Shin B-c | 21 | 21
6 | (Japan) K Matsui (Japan) Y Takeuchi | 16 | 8

=== Bottom half ===
==== Section 3 ====
First Round
(Vietnam) Bảo M (Vietnam) Dương B Đ | 19 | 16
(China) Dai EY (China) Feng YZ | 21 | 21
(Chinese Taipei) Lu C-h (Chinese Taipei) Shih K-c | 15 | 17
8 | (Malaysia) Tan B H (South Korea) Yoo Y-s | 21 | 21
Q2 | (Indonesia) C Kristanto (Indonesia) G D Oktavan | 26 | 23 | 14
(Chinese Taipei) Lin S-k (Chinese Taipei) Tseng M-h | 28 | 21 | 21
(Japan) M Takano (Japan) Y Tsukamoto | 17 | 21 | 19
3 | (Malaysia) Shia C K (Malaysia) Tan W G | 21 | 10 | 21

Second Round
(China) Dai EY (China) Feng YZ | 21 | 0
8 | (Malaysia) Tan B H (South Korea) Yoo Y-s | 18 | 0^{r}
(Chinese Taipei) Lin S-k (Chinese Taipei) Tseng M-h | 21 | 15 | 21
3 | (Malaysia) Shia C K (Malaysia) Tan W G | 17 | 21 | 14

Quarter-finals
(China) Dai EY (China) Feng YZ | 13 | 14
(Chinese Taipei) Lin S-k (Chinese Taipei) Tseng M-h | 21 | 21

==== Section 4 ====
First Round
(Chinese Taipei) Lee S-m (Chinese Taipei) Yang P-h | 21 | 21
(Malaysia) Chen J H (Malaysia) Yeoh S Z | 9 | 10
(Chinese Taipei) Chang K-c (Chinese Taipei) Lin Y-h | 14 | 15
7 | (Japan) H Okamura (Japan) M Onodera | 21 | 21
(Vietnam) Đỗ T Đ (Vietnam) Phạm N T | 13 | 9
(Malaysia) Goh S F (Malaysia) N Izzuddin | 21 | 21
(Chinese Taipei) Lee F-c (Chinese Taipei) Lee F-j | 12 | 21 | 21
2 | (Thailand) I Apisuk (Thailand) T Viriyangkura | 21 | 10 | 23

Second Round
(Chinese Taipei) Lee S-m (Chinese Taipei) Yang P-h | 19 | 21 | 21
7 | (Japan) H Okamura (Japan) M Onodera | 21 | 10 | 15
(Malaysia) Goh S F (Malaysia) N Izzuddin | 21 | 22
2 | (Thailand) I Apisuk (Thailand) T Viriyangkura | 7 | 20

Quarter-finals
(Chinese Taipei) Lee S-m (Chinese Taipei) Yang P-h | 21 | 19 | 21
(Malaysia) Goh S F (Malaysia) N Izzuddin | 14 | 21 | 15

== Women's doubles ==
=== Seeds ===
1. (Japan) Ayako Sakuramoto / Yukiko Takahata (first round)
2. (India) Meghana Jakkampudi / Poorvisha S. Ram (first round)
3. (Thailand) Savitree Amitrapai / Pacharapun Chochuwong (quarter-finals)
4. (Japan) Misato Aratama / Akane Watanabe (champions)
5. (Indonesia) Agatha Imanuela / Siti Fadia Silva Ramadhanti (quarter-finals)
6. (Japan) Nami Matsuyama / Chiharu Shida (final)
7. (Japan) Minami Kawashima / Aoi Matsuda (quarter-finals)
8. (Chinese Taipei) Chen Hsiao-huan / Hu Ling-fang (second round)

=== Finals ===
Semi-finals
Q3 | (China) Chen Lu (China) Xu Ya | 10 | 13
4 | (Japan) Misato Aratama (Japan) Akane Watanabe | 21 | 21
6 | (Japan) Nami Matsuyama (Japan) Chiharu Shida | 21 | 21
Q4 | (Indonesia) Pitha Haningtyas Mentari (Indonesia) Virni Putri | 19 | 19

Final
4 | (Japan) Misato Aratama (Japan) Akane Watanabe | 21 | 21
6 | (Japan) Nami Matsuyama (Japan) Chiharu Shida | 18 | 19

=== Top half ===
==== Section 1 ====
First Round
1 | (Japan) A Sakuramoto (Japan) Y Takahata | 16 | 21 | 10
Q3 | (China) Chen L (China) Xu Y | 21 | 11 | 21
(Chinese Taipei) Chang H-t (Chinese Taipei) Yu C-h | 19 | 21 | 20
(Indonesia) Y Barkah (Indonesia) J F Sugiarto | 21 | 16 | 22
8 | (Chinese Taipei) Chen H-h (Chinese Taipei) Hu L-f | 21 | 21
(Chinese Taipei) Lee C-c (Chinese Taipei) Liu C-y | 11 | 4
Q1 | (Hong Kong) Ng S Y (Hong Kong) Wu Y T | 21 | 17 | 14
(Japan) M Kashihara (Japan) M Kato | 18 | 21 | 21

Second Round
Q3 | (China) Chen L (China) Xu Y | 21 | 21
(Indonesia) Y Barkah (Indonesia) J F Sugiarto | 19 | 18
8 | (Chinese Taipei) Chen H-h (Chinese Taipei) Hu L-f | 15 | 20
(Japan) M Kashihara (Japan) M Kato | 21 | 22

Quarter-finals
Q3 | (China) Chen L (China) Xu Y | 21 | 18 | 21
(Japan) M Kashihara (Japan) M Kato | 12 | 21 | 12

==== Section 2 ====
First Round
4 | (Japan) M Aratama (Japan) A Watanabe | 21 | 21
(Chinese Taipei) Cheng Y-p (Chinese Taipei) Lin J-y | 15 | 6
(China) Guo LZ (China) Zhou XR | 22 | 18 | 10
(Malaysia) A Cheong C Y (Malaysia) D Siow H S | 20 | 21 | 21
5 | (Indonesia) A Imanuela (Indonesia) S F S Ramadhanti | 21 | 24 | 21
(Chinese Taipei) Chang C-h (Chinese Taipei) Yang C-t | 18 | 26 | 14
(Thailand) K Dubthuk (Thailand) T Wongya | 21 | 12 | 13
(Indonesia) M C Bandaso (Indonesia) S Kani | 11 | 21 | 21

Second Round
4 | (Japan) M Aratama (Japan) A Watanabe | 21 | 21
(Malaysia) A Cheong C Y (Malaysia) D Siow H S | 6 | 14
5 | (Indonesia) A Imanuela (Indonesia) S F S Ramadhanti | 21 | 20 | 21
(Indonesia) M C Bandaso (Indonesia) S Kani | 14 | 22 | 13

Quarter-finals
4 | (Japan) M Aratama (Japan) A Watanabe | 12 | 21 | 21
5 | (Indonesia) A Imanuela (Indonesia) S F S Ramadhanti | 21 | 16 | 15

=== Bottom half ===
==== Section 3 ====
First Round
(Malaysia) Lim C S (Malaysia) Tan S J | 21 | 16
(Japan) R Kawashima (Japan) S Ozaki | 23 | 21
(Malaysia) Teoh M X (Malaysia) Yap C W | 15 | 9
6 | (Japan) N Matsuyama (Japan) C Shida | 21 | 21
(Thailand) R Laisuan (Thailand) S Mingchua | 17 | 15
(Chinese Taipei) Kuo Y-w (Chinese Taipei) Lin W-c | 21 | 21
(Chinese Taipei) Hung E-t (Chinese Taipei) Liang T-y | 16 | 17
3 | (Thailand) S Amitrapai (Thailand) P Chochuwong | 21 | 21

Second Round
(Japan) R Kawashima (Japan) S Ozaki | 21 | 14 | 14
6 | (Japan) N Matsuyama (Japan) C Shida | 17 | 21 | 21
(Chinese Taipei) Kuo Y-w (Chinese Taipei) Lin W-c | 14 | 17
3 | (Thailand) S Amitrapai (Thailand) P Chochuwong | 21 | 21

Quarter-finals
6 | (Japan) N Matsuyama (Japan) C Shida | 21 | 21
3 | (Thailand) S Amitrapai (Thailand) P Chochuwong | 16 | 12

==== Section 4 ====
First Round
(Vietnam) Đinh T P H (Vietnam) Đỗ T H | 9 | 18
Q2 | (Chinese Taipei) Hung Y-t (Chinese Taipei) Tang W-y | 21 | 21
(Chinese Taipei) Hung S-h (Chinese Taipei) Lin X-m | 15 | 19
7 | (Japan) M Kawashima (Japan) A Matsuda | 21 | 21
(Singapore) C P Sari Dewi (Singapore) Jin YJ | 12 | 13
(China) Chen YX (China) Lin FL | 21 | 21
Q4 | (Indonesia) P H Mentari (Indonesia) V Putri | 17 | 21 | 21
2 | (India) M Jakkampudi (India) P S. Ram | 21 | 8 | 10

Second Round
Q2 | (Chinese Taipei) Hung Y-t (Chinese Taipei) Tang W-y | 15 | 18
7 | (Japan) M Kawashima (Japan) A Matsuda | 21 | 21
(China) Chen YX (China) Lin FL | 16 | 21 | 11
Q4 | (Indonesia) P H Mentari (Indonesia) V Putri | 21 | 14 | 21

Quarter-finals
7 | (Japan) M Kawashima (Japan) A Matsuda | 17 | 11
Q4 | (Indonesia) P H Mentari (Indonesia) V Putri | 21 | 21

== Mixed doubles ==
=== Seeds ===
1. (Russia) Evgenij Dremin / Evgenia Dimova (withdrew)
2. (Vietnam) Đỗ Tuấn Đức / Phạm Như Thảo (second round)
3. (Malaysia) Chen Tang Jie / Peck Yen Wei (second round)
4. (Malaysia) Mohamad Arif Abdul Latif Arif / (Indonesia) Rusydina Antardayu Riodingin (second round)
5. (Chinese Taipei) Chang Ko-chi / Cheng Chi-ya (second round)
6. (India) Shivam Sharma / Poorvisha S. Ram (first round)
7. (China) Chen Sihang / Xu Ya (quarter-finals)
8. (Chinese Taipei) Tseng Min-hao / Chen Hsiao-huan (first round)

=== Finals ===
Semi-finals
(Japan) Kohei Gondo (Japan) Ayane Kurihara | 21 | 16 | 18
(Indonesia) Alfian Eko Prasetya (Indonesia) Marsheilla Gischa Islami | 19 | 21 | 21
(Indonesia) Rinov Rivaldy (Indonesia) Pitha Haningtyas Mentari | 16 | 21 | 12
Q2 | (Thailand) Nipitphon Phuangphuapet (Thailand) Savitree Amitrapai | 21 | 12 | 21

Final
(Indonesia) Alfian Eko Prasetya (Indonesia) Marsheilla Gischa Islami | 21 | 18 | 19
Q2 | (Thailand) Nipitphon Phuangphuapet (Thailand) Savitree Amitrapai | 13 | 21 | 21

=== Top half ===
==== Section 1 ====
First Round
PFQ | (China) Jiang ZB (China) Chen YX | 21 | 18 | 23
Q3 | (India) D Kapila (India) M Jakkampudi | 17 | 21 | 21
(Japan) K Gondo (Japan) A Kurihara | 12 | 21 | 21
Q1 | (Hong Kong) Chang T C (Hong Kong) Fan K Y | 21 | 18 | 15
7 | (China) Chen SH (China) Xu Y | 21 | 23
(Chinese Taipei) Lee F-j (Chinese Taipei) Yu C-h | 12 | 21
Q4 | (Japan) T Saito (Japan) A Watanabe | 22 | 20 | 18
(Indonesia) R N Kusharjanto (Indonesia) S F S Ramadhanti | 20 | 22 | 21

Second Round
PFQ | (China) Jiang ZB (China) Chen YX | 12 | 12
(Japan) K Gondo (Japan) A Kurihara | 21 | 21
7 | (China) Chen SH (China) Xu Y | 21 | 19 | 21
(Indonesia) R N Kusharjanto (Indonesia) S F S Ramadhanti | 18 | 21 | 16

Quarter-finals
(Japan) K Gondo (Japan) A Kurihara | 22 | 21
7 | (China) Chen SH (China) Xu Y | 20 | 16

==== Section 2 ====
First Round
3 | (Malaysia) Chen T J (Malaysia) Peck Y W | 21 | 21
(Thailand) P Thongnuam (Thailand) K Dubthuk | 6 | 16
(Indonesia) A E Prasetya (Indonesia) M G Islami | 21 | 21
(Chinese Taipei) Chang E-c (Chinese Taipei) Chang Y-l | 17 | 15
8 | (Chinese Taipei) Tseng M-h (Chinese Taipei) Chen H-h | 17 | 21 | 16
(Japan) K Mitsuhashi (Japan) N Shinoya | 21 | 16 | 21
(Chinese Taipei) Po L-w (Chinese Taipei) Chang C-h | 21 | 19 | 21
(Malaysia) Lim Z T (Malaysia) Chin K M | 8 | 21 | 18

Second Round
3 | (Malaysia) Chen T J (Malaysia) Peck Y W | 16 | 16
(Indonesia) A E Prasetya (Indonesia) M G Islami | 21 | 21
(Japan) K Mitsuhashi (Japan) N Shinoya | 21 | 21
(Chinese Taipei) Po L-w (Chinese Taipei) Chang C-h | 13 | 19

Quarter-finals
(Indonesia) A E Prasetya (Indonesia) M G Islami | 21 | 21
(Japan) K Mitsuhashi (Japan) N Shinoya | 16 | 6

=== Bottom half ===
==== Section 3 ====
First Round
(England) C Hemming (England) Liew F T | 21 | 15 | 21
(Chinese Taipei) Lin S-c (Chinese Taipei) Kuo Y-w | 18 | 21 | 13
(Japan) T Urai (Japan) R Miyaura | 21 | 21
6 | (India) S Sharma (India) P S. Ram | 15 | 16
(Malaysia) N M A Ayub (Malaysia) P Lim P Y | 12 | 19
(Indonesia) R Rivaldy (Indonesia) P H Mentari | 21 | 21
(Singapore) B A Prakoso (Singapore) Jin YJ | 19 | 10
4 | (Malaysia) M A A Latif (Indonesia) R A Riodingin | 21 | 21

Second Round
(England) C Hemming (England) Liew F T | 12 | 20
(Japan) T Urai (Japan) R Miyaura | 21 | 22
(Indonesia) R Rivaldy (Indonesia) P H Mentari | 22 | 14 | 21
4 | (Malaysia) M A A Latif (Indonesia) R A Riodingin | 20 | 21 | 8

Quarter-finals
(Japan) T Urai (Japan) R Miyaura | 19 | 15
(Indonesia) R Rivaldy (Indonesia) P H Mentari | 21 | 21

==== Section 4 ====
First Round
Q2 | (Thailand) N Phuangphuapet (Thailand) S Amitrapai | 21 | 21
(Chinese Taipei) Yang M-t (Chinese Taipei) Sung S-y | 10 | 19
(Indonesia) F Abimanyu (Indonesia) B F Romadhini | 21 | 18 | 14
5 | (Chinese Taipei) Chang K-c (Chinese Taipei) Cheng C-y | 11 | 21 | 21
(Indonesia) A Ramadiansyah (Indonesia) M C Bandaso | 21 | 18
(Chinese Taipei) Lin C-y (Chinese Taipei) Lin W-c | 23 | 21
(China) Fan QY (China) Chen L | 17 | 16
2 | (Vietnam) Đỗ T Đ (Vietnam) Phạm N T | 21 | 21

Second Round
Q2 | (Thailand) N Phuangphuapet (Thailand) S Amitrapai | 21 | 21
5 | (Chinese Taipei) Chang K-c (Chinese Taipei) Cheng C-y | 13 | 12
(Chinese Taipei) Lin C-y (Chinese Taipei) Lin W-c | 21 | 11 | 21
2 | (Vietnam) Đỗ T Đ (Vietnam) Phạm N T | 14 | 21 | 19

Quarter-finals
Q2 | (Thailand) N Phuangphuapet (Thailand) S Amitrapai | 21 | 21
(Chinese Taipei) Lin C-y (Chinese Taipei) Lin W-c | 19 | 16

| Preceded by 2018 Russian Open | BWF World Tour; 2018 BWF season | Succeeded by 2018 Spain Masters |
