= 2023 China Open (badminton) =

Tournament details
- Dates: 5 – 10 September
- Level: Super 1000
- Total prize money: US$2,000,000
- Venue: Changzhou Olympic Sports Centre Xincheng Gymnasium
- Location: Changzhou, Jiangsu, China

Champions
- Men's singles: (Denmark) Viktor Axelsen
- Women's singles: (South Korea) An Se-young
- Men's doubles: (China) Liang Weikeng (China) Wang Chang
- Women's doubles: (China) Chen Qingchen (China) Jia Yifan
- Mixed doubles: (South Korea) Seo Seung-jae (South Korea) Chae Yoo-jung

The 2023 China Open (officially known as the Victor China Open 2023 for sponsorship reasons) was a badminton tournament which took place at Changzhou Olympic Sports Centre Xincheng Gymnasium in Changzhou, Jiangsu, China from 5 to 10 September 2023 and had a total prize of $2,000,000 which is the biggest prize money offer for season calendar except BWF World Tour Finals.

== Tournament ==
The 2023 China Open was the twentieth tournament of the 2023 BWF World Tour and also part of the China Open championships, which had been held since 1986. This tournament was organized by Chinese Badminton Association, and sanctioned by the BWF.

=== Venue ===
This international tournament was held at Changzhou Olympic Sports Centre Xincheng Gymnasium in Changzhou, Jiangsu, China.

=== Point distribution ===
Below is the tables with the point distribution for each phase of the tournament based on the BWF points system for the BWF World Tour Super 1000 event.

| Winner | Runner-up | 3/4 | 5/8 | 9/16 | 17/32 |
|---|---|---|---|---|---|
| 12,000 | 10,200 | 8,400 | 6,600 | 4,800 | 3,000 |

=== Prize money ===
The total prize money for this year tournament was US$2,000,000. Distribution of prize money was in accordance with BWF regulations.

| Event | Winner | Finalist | Semi-finals | Quarter-finals | Last 16 | Last 32 |
| Singles | $140,000 | $68,000 | $28,000 | $11,000 | $6,000 | $2,000 |
| Doubles | $148,000 | $70,000 | $28,000 | $12,500 | $6,500 | $2,000 |

== Men's singles ==
=== Seeds ===
1. (Denmark) Viktor Axelsen (Champion)
2. (Indonesia) Anthony Sinisuka Ginting (First round)
3. (Thailand) Kunlavut Vitidsarn (Withdrew)
4. (Japan) Kodai Naraoka (Quarter-finals)
5. (Indonesia) Jonatan Christie (Semi-finals)
6. (China) Li Shifeng (Second round)
7. (Singapore) Loh Kean Yew (Quarter-finals)
8. (China) Shi Yuqi (Semi-finals)

=== Finals ===
Semi-finals
1 | (Denmark) Viktor Axelsen | 21 | 21
5 | (Indonesia) Jonatan Christie | 17 | 14
8 | (China) Shi Yuqi | 13 | 14
(China) Lu Guangzu | 21 | 21

Final
1 | (Denmark) Viktor Axelsen | 21 | 21
(China) Lu Guangzu | 16 | 19

=== Top half ===
==== Section 1 ====
First round
1 | (Denmark) V Axelsen | 21 | 21
(Indonesia) C A Dwi Wardoyo | 17 | 18
(Chinese Taipei) Wang T-w | 23 | 22
(Japan) K Nishimoto | 21 | 20
7 | (Singapore) Loh K Y | 21 | 21
(France) C Popov | 14 | 17
(Denmark) A Antonsen | 23 | 16 | 21
(India) L Sen | 21 | 21 | 9

Second round
1 | (Denmark) V Axelsen | 20 | 21 | 21
(Chinese Taipei) Wang T-w | 22 | 6 | 14
7 | (Singapore) Loh K Y | 21 | 21
(Denmark) A Antonsen | 17 | 12

Quarter-finals
1 | (Denmark) V Axelsen | 21 | 23
7 | (Singapore) Loh K Y | 17 | 21

==== Section 2 ====
First round
PFR | (Indonesia) S H Rhustavito | 21 | 26
(India) P Rajawat | 13 | 24
(India) Prannoy H. S. | 12 | 21 | 18
(Malaysia) Ng T Y | 21 | 13 | 21
5 | (Indonesia) J Christie | 22 | 19 | 21
(China) Weng HY | 20 | 21 | 10
(Canada) B Yang | 21 | 14 | 21
PFR | (Israel) M Zilberman | 8 | 21 | 18

Second round
PFR | (Indonesia) S H Rhustavito | 18 | 21 | 22
(Malaysia) Ng T Y | 21 | 11 | 20
5 | (Indonesia) J Christie | 12 | 21 | 21
(Canada) B Yang | 21 | 15 | 14

Quarter-finals
PFR | (Indonesia) S H Rhustavito | 12 | 17
5 | (Indonesia) J Christie | 21 | 21

=== Bottom half ===
==== Section 3 ====
First round
(Thailand) K Wangcharoen | 18 | 21 | 15
(Denmark) R Gemke | 21 | 18 | 21
(Denmark) M Johannesen | 8 | 11
8 | (China) Shi YQ | 21 | 21
(France) T J Popov | 15 | 21 | 16
(Chinese Taipei) Lin C-y | 21 | 10 | 21
(Malaysia) Lee Z J | 24 | 21 | 11
4 | (Japan) K Naraoka | 26 | 12 | 21

Second round
(Denmark) R Gemke | 11 | 21 | 16
8 | (China) Shi YQ | 21 | 16 | 21
(Chinese Taipei) Lin C-y | 19 | 8
4 | (Japan) K Naraoka | 21 | 21

Quarter-finals
8 | (China) Shi YQ | 18 | 21 | 22
4 | (Japan) K Naraoka | 21 | 9 | 20

==== Section 4 ====
First round
(China) Lu GZ | 21 | 21
(Hong Kong) Ng K L | 17 | 15
(Chinese Taipei) Chou T-c | 14 | 21 | 18
6 | (China) Li SF | 21 | 18 | 21
(China) Zhao JP | 19 | 23 | 19
(Hong Kong) Lee C Y | 21 | 21 | 21
(Japan) K Tsuneyama | 21 | 18 | 21
2 | (Indonesia) A S Ginting | 11 | 21 | 17

Second round
(China) Lu GZ | 21 | 21
6 | (China) Li SF | 19 | 12
(Hong Kong) Lee C Y | 9 | 8
(Japan) K Tsuneyama | 21 | 21

Quarter-finals
(China) Lu GZ | 14 | 21 | 21
(Japan) K Tsuneyama | 21 | 18 | 8

== Women's singles ==
=== Seeds ===
1. (South Korea) An Se-young (Champion)
2. (Japan) Akane Yamaguchi (Final)
3. (China) Chen Yufei (Semi-finals)
4. (Chinese Taipei) Tai Tzu-ying (Semi-finals)
5. (China) He Bingjiao (Quarter-finals)
6. (Spain) Carolina Marín (Quarter-finals)
7. (Thailand) Ratchanok Intanon (Withdrew)
8. (Indonesia) Gregoria Mariska Tunjung (First round)

=== Finals ===
Semi-finals
1 | (South Korea) An Se-young | 21 | 21
4 | (Chinese Taipei) Tai Tzu-ying | 18 | 14
3 | (China) Chen Yufei | 21 | 15 | 17
2 | (Japan) Akane Yamaguchi | 19 | 21 | 21

Final
1 | (South Korea) An Se-young | 21 | 21
2 | (Japan) Akane Yamaguchi | 10 | 19

=== Top half ===
==== Section 1 ====
First round
1 | (South Korea) An S-y | 21 | 21
(Denmark) M Blichfeldt | 16 | 12
(China) Wang ZY | 21 | 21
(Singapore) Yeo J M | 17 | 19
8 | (Indonesia) G M Tunjung | 15 | 14
(Vietnam) Nguyễn T L | 21 | 21
(Thailand) P Chochuwong | 19 | 17
(China) Han Y | 21 | 21

Second round
1 | (South Korea) An S-y | 21 | 22
(China) Wang ZY | 14 | 20
(Vietnam) Nguyễn T L | 23 | 8 | 5
(China) Han Y | 21 | 21 | 21

Quarter-finals
1 | (South Korea) An S-y | 15 | 21 | 21
(China) Han Y | 21 | 15 | 17

==== Section 2 ====
First round
4 | (Chinese Taipei) Tai T-y | 21 | 21
(Chinese Taipei) Pai Y-p | 13 | 17
(China) Zhang YM | 21 | 21
(Thailand) B Ongbamrungphan | 18 | 14
6 | (Spain) C Marín | 21 | 21
(Chinese Taipei) Hsu W-c | 12 | 12
(China) Gao FJ | 21 | 21
(Japan) N Nidaira | 13 | 14

Second round
4 | (Chinese Taipei) Tai T-y | 21 | 21
(China) Zhang YM | 11 | 12
6 | (Spain) C Marín | 21 | 21
(China) Gao FJ | 9 | 16

Quarter-finals
4 | (Chinese Taipei) Tai T-y | 21 | 10 | 21
6 | (Spain) C Marín | 17 | 21 | 19

=== Bottom half ===
==== Section 3 ====
First round
(Japan) S Kawakami | 12 | 22 | 22
(Thailand) S Katethong | 21 | 20 | 20
(Chinese Taipei) Sung S-y | 15 | 13
5 | (China) He BJ | 21 | 21
PFR | (Malaysia) Goh J W | 18 | 12
(Japan) A Ohori | 21 | 21
(United States) BW Zhang | 18 | 5
3 | (China) Chen YF | 21 | 21

Second round
(Japan) S Kawakami | 5 | 16
5 | (China) He BJ | 21 | 21
(Japan) A Ohori | 20 | 9
3 | (China) Chen YF | 22 | 21

Quarter-finals
5 | (China) He BJ | 18 | 11
3 | (China) Chen YF | 21 | 21

==== Section 4 ====
First round
(Scotland) K Gilmour | 16 | 18
(Germany) Y Li | 21 | 21
(Denmark) L Kjærsfeldt | 21 | 21
PFR | (United States) L Lam | 15 | 13
(South Korea) Kim G-e | 21 | 6
PFR | (Belgium) L Tan | 19 | 2^{r}
(Indonesia) P K Wardani | 12 | 18
2 | (Japan) A Yamaguchi | 21 | 21

Second round
(Germany) Y Li | 19 | 10
(Denmark) L Kjærsfeldt | 21 | 21
(South Korea) Kim G-e | 20 | 17
2 | (Japan) A Yamaguchi | 22 | 21

Quarter-finals
(Denmark) L Kjærsfeldt | 15 | 13
2 | (Japan) A Yamaguchi | 21 | 21

== Men's doubles ==
=== Seeds ===
1. (Indonesia) Fajar Alfian / Muhammad Rian Ardianto (First round)
2. (India) Satwiksairaj Rankireddy / Chirag Shetty (First round)
3. (China) Liang Weikeng / Wang Chang (Champions)
4. (Malaysia) Aaron Chia / Soh Wooi Yik (Final)
5. (Japan) Takuro Hoki / Yugo Kobayashi (Semi-finals)
6. (South Korea) Kang Min-hyuk / Seo Seung-jae (Semi-finals)
7. (China) Liu Yuchen / Ou Xuanyi (Quarter-finals)
8. (Malaysia) Ong Yew Sin / Teo Ee Yi (Quarter-finals)

=== Finals ===
Semi-finals
5 | (Japan) Takuro Hoki (Japan) Yugo Kobayashi | 16 | 22 | 20
3 | (China) Liang Weikeng (China) Wang Chang | 21 | 20 | 22
4 | (Malaysia) Aaron Chia (Malaysia) Soh Wooi Yik | 21 | 21
6 | (South Korea) Kang Min-hyuk (South Korea) Seo Seung-jae | 18 | 17

Final
3 | (China) Liang Weikeng (China) Wang Chang | 21 | 21
4 | (Malaysia) Aaron Chia (Malaysia) Soh Wooi Yik | 12 | 14

=== Top half ===
==== Section 1 ====
First round
1 | (Indonesia) F Alfian (Indonesia) M R Ardianto | 19 | 19
(Denmark) K Astrup (Denmark) A S Rasmussen | 21 | 21
(Chinese Taipei) Lu C-y (Chinese Taipei) Yang P-ha | 20 | 13
(Chinese Taipei) Lee J-h (Chinese Taipei) Yang P-hs | 22 | 21
5 | (Japan) T Hoki (Japan) Y Kobayashi | 21 | 21
(Thailand) S Jomkoh (Thailand) K Kedren | 9 | 5
(India) M.R. Arjun (India) D Kapila | 21 | 19
(Japan) K Matsui (Japan) Y Takeuchi | 23 | 21

Second round
(Denmark) K Astrup (Denmark) A S Rasmussen | 21 | 21
(Chinese Taipei) Lee J-h (Chinese Taipei) Yang P-hs | 8 | 13
5 | (Japan) T Hoki (Japan) Y Kobayashi | 21 | 21
(Japan) K Matsui (Japan) Y Takeuchi | 17 | 19

Quarter-finals
(Denmark) K Astrup (Denmark) A S Rasmussen | 12 | 17
5 | (Japan) T Hoki (Japan) Y Kobayashi | 21 | 21

==== Section 2 ====
First round
3 | (China) Liang WK (China) Wang C | 21 | 21
(Indonesia) L R Carnando (Indonesia) D Marthin | 15 | 18
(Scotland) A Dunn (Scotland) A Hall | 13 | 17
(Japan) A Koga (Japan) T Saito | 21 | 21
7 | (China) Liu YC (China) Ou XY | 21 | 21
(France) C Popov (France) T J Popov | 16 | 14
(Germany) M Lamsfuß (Germany) M Seidel | 21 | 13 | 16
(Chinese Taipei) Lee F-c (Chinese Taipei) Lee F-j | 18 | 21 | 21

Second round
3 | (China) Liang WK (China) Wang C | 21 | 22
(Japan) A Koga (Japan) T Saito | 14 | 20
7 | (China) Liu YC (China) Ou XY | 15 | 21 | 21
(Chinese Taipei) Lee F-c (Chinese Taipei) Lee F-j | 21 | 17 | 18

Quarter-finals
3 | (China) Liang WK (China) Wang C | 21 | 21
7 | (China) Liu YC (China) Ou XY | 18 | 19

=== Bottom half ===
==== Section 3 ====
First round
(France) L Corvée (France) R Labar | 17 | 9
(Denmark) R Kjær (Denmark) F Søgaard | 21 | 21
(China) Ren XY (China) Tan Q | 16 | 21
8 | (Malaysia) Ong Y S (Malaysia) Teo E Y | 21 | 23
(China) He JT (China) Zhou HD | 21 | 21
(Chinese Taipei) Chang K-c (Chinese Taipei) Po L-w | 14 | 17
(South Korea) Choi S-g (South Korea) Kim W-h | 10 | 23
4 | (Malaysia) A Chia (Malaysia) Soh W Y | 21 | 25

Second round
(Denmark) R Kjær (Denmark) F Søgaard | 12 | 17
8 | (Malaysia) Ong Y S (Malaysia) Teo E Y | 21 | 21
(China) He JT (China) Zhou HD | 16 | 17
4 | (Malaysia) A Chia (Malaysia) Soh W Y | 21 | 21

Quarter-finals
8 | (Malaysia) Ong Y S (Malaysia) Teo E Y | 21 | 19 | 11
4 | (Malaysia) A Chia (Malaysia) Soh W Y | 19 | 21 | 21

==== Section 4 ====
First round
(Chinese Taipei) Lee Y (Chinese Taipei) Wang C-l | 21 | 21
(Chinese Taipei) Su C-h (Chinese Taipei) Ye H-w | 14 | 14
(Indonesia) M Ahsan (Indonesia) H Setiawan | 18 | 21 | 12
6 | (South Korea) Kang M-h (South Korea) Seo S-j | 21 | 15 | 21
(Indonesia) P Kusumawardana (Indonesia) Y Rambitan | 22 | 19 | 21
(Japan) A Endo (Japan) Y Takei | 20 | 21 | 17
(Indonesia) M S Fikri (Indonesia) B Maulana | 21 | 11 | 21
2 | (India) S Rankireddy (India) C Shetty | 17 | 21 | 17

Second round
(Chinese Taipei) Lee Y (Chinese Taipei) Wang C-l | 19 | 21 | 23
6 | (South Korea) Kang M-h (South Korea) Seo S-j | 21 | 17 | 25
(Indonesia) P Kusumawardana (Indonesia) Y Rambitan | 16 | 12
(Indonesia) M S Fikri (Indonesia) B Maulana | 21 | 21

Quarter-finals
6 | (South Korea) Kang M-h (South Korea) Seo S-j | 21 | 21
(Indonesia) M S Fikri (Indonesia) B Maulana | 15 | 17

== Women's doubles ==
=== Seeds ===
1. (China) Chen Qingchen / Jia Yifan (Champions)
2. (South Korea) Baek Ha-na / Lee So-hee (Final)
3. (South Korea) Kim So-yeong / Kong Hee-yong (Withdrew)
4. (Japan) Mayu Matsumoto / Wakana Nagahara (Quarter-finals)
5. (Japan) Yuki Fukushima / Sayaka Hirota (Quarter-finals)
6. (China) Zhang Shuxian / Zheng Yu (First round)
7. (Japan) Nami Matsuyama / Chiharu Shida (Semi-finals)
8. (Thailand) Jongkolphan Kititharakul / Rawinda Prajongjai (First round)

=== Finals ===
Semi-finals
1 | (China) Chen Qingchen (China) Jia Yifan | 20 | 21 | 21
7 | (Japan) Nami Matsuyama (Japan) Chiharu Shida | 22 | 15 | 16
(Japan) Rena Miyaura (Japan) Ayako Sakuramoto | 18 | 14
2 | (South Korea) Baek Ha-na (South Korea) Lee So-hee | 21 | 21

Final
1 | (China) Chen Qingchen (China) Jia Yifan | 21 | 21
2 | (South Korea) Baek Ha-na (South Korea) Lee So-hee | 11 | 17

=== Top half ===
==== Section 1 ====
First round
1 | (China) Chen QC (China) Jia YF | 21 | 21
(India) T Jolly (India) G Gopichand | 18 | 11
(Japan) R Iwanaga (Japan) K Nakanishi | 21 | 15 | 9
(Hong Kong) Yeung N T (Hong Kong) Yeung P L | 17 | 21 | 21
5 | (Japan) Y Fukushima (Japan) S Hirota | 21 | 21
(Germany) L Efler (Germany) I Lohau | 6 | 8
(Malaysia) P Tan (Malaysia) Thinaah M | 17 | 21 | 21
(Netherlands) D Jille (Netherlands) C Seinen | 21 | 17 | 10

Second round
1 | (China) Chen QC (China) Jia YF | 21 | 21
(Hong Kong) Yeung N T (Hong Kong) Yeung P L | 15 | 19
5 | (Japan) Y Fukushima (Japan) S Hirota | 21 | 21
(Malaysia) P Tan (Malaysia) Thinaah M | 16 | 16

Quarter-finals
1 | (China) Chen QC (China) Jia YF | 21 | 21
5 | (Japan) Y Fukushima (Japan) S Hirota | 18 | 11

==== Section 2 ====
First round
4 | (Japan) M Matsumoto (Japan) W Nagahara | 21 | 21
(Bulgaria) G Stoeva (Bulgaria) S Stoeva | 10 | 13
(Denmark) M Fruergaard (Denmark) S Thygesen | 21 | 21
(Chinese Taipei) Lee C-h (Chinese Taipei) Teng C-h | 15 | 18
7 | (Japan) N Matsuyama (Japan) C Shida | 21 | 22 | 21
(France) M Lambert (France) A Tran | 15 | 24 | 18
(Chinese Taipei) Hsu Y-c (Chinese Taipei) Lin W-c | 17 | 22 | 25
(China) Li YJ (China) Luo XM | 21 | 20 | 23

Second round
4 | (Japan) M Matsumoto (Japan) W Nagahara | 21 | 21
(Denmark) M Fruergaard (Denmark) S Thygesen | 12 | 15
7 | (Japan) N Matsuyama (Japan) C Shida | 21 | 21
(Chinese Taipei) Hsu Y-c (Chinese Taipei) Lin W-c | 16 | 16

Quarter-finals
4 | (Japan) M Matsumoto (Japan) W Nagahara | 14 | 16
7 | (Japan) N Matsuyama (Japan) C Shida | 21 | 21

=== Bottom half ===
==== Section 3 ====
First round
(Indonesia) F D Kusuma (Indonesia) A C Pratiwi | 21 | 15 | 20
(Malaysia) A Cheong (Malaysia) Teoh M X | 19 | 21 | 22
(Japan) R Miyaura (Japan) A Sakuramoto | 21 | 21
6 | (China) Zhang SX (China) Zheng Y | 18 | 18
(South Korea) Lee Y-l (South Korea) Shin S-c | 19 | 7
(China) Liu SS (China) Tan N | 21 | 21
PFR | (United States) P L Cao Hok (United States) L Lam | w | / | o
3 | (South Korea) Kim S-y (South Korea) Kong H-y

Second round
(Malaysia) A Cheong (Malaysia) Teoh M X | 11 | 18
(Japan) R Miyaura (Japan) A Sakuramoto | 21 | 21
(China) Liu SS (China) Tan N | 21 | 21
PFR | (United States) P L Cao Hok (United States) L Lam | 14 | 7

Quarter-finals
(Japan) R Miyaura (Japan) A Sakuramoto | 20 | 21 | 21
(China) Liu SS (China) Tan N | 22 | 18 | 16

==== Section 4 ====
First round
(South Korea) Jeong N-e (South Korea) Kim H-j | 21 | 24 | 21
(Thailand) B Aimsaard (Thailand) N Aimsaard | 13 | 26 | 15
(Indonesia) A Rahayu (Indonesia) S F S Ramadhanti | 17 | 21 | 21
8 | (Thailand) J Kititharakul (Thailand) R Prajongjai | 21 | 12 | 19
(Japan) R Hirokami (Japan) Y Kato | 21 | 11 | 20
(Malaysia) V Hoo (Malaysia) Lim C S | 12 | 21 | 22
(China) Li WM (China) Liu XX | 18 | 13
2 | (South Korea) Baek H-n (South Korea) Lee S-h | 21 | 21

Second round
(South Korea) Jeong N-e (South Korea) Kim H-j | 16 | 18
(Indonesia) A Rahayu (Indonesia) S F S Ramadhanti | 21 | 21
(Malaysia) V Hoo (Malaysia) Lim C S | 17 | 14
2 | (South Korea) Baek H-n (South Korea) Lee S-h | 21 | 21

Quarter-finals
(Indonesia) A Rahayu (Indonesia) S F S Ramadhanti | 15 | 21 | 10
2 | (South Korea) Baek H-n (South Korea) Lee S-h | 21 | 18 | 21

== Mixed doubles ==
=== Seeds ===
1. (China) Zheng Siwei / Huang Yaqiong (Quarter-finals)
2. (Japan) Yuta Watanabe / Arisa Higashino (Quarter-finals)
3. (China) Feng Yanzhe / Huang Dongping (Second round)
4. (Thailand) Dechapol Puavaranukroh / Sapsiree Taerattanachai (Quarter-finals)
5. (South Korea) Seo Seung-jae / Chae Yoo-jung (Champions)
6. (South Korea) Kim Won-ho / Jeong Na-eun (Second round)
7. (China) Jiang Zhenbang / Wei Yaxin (First round)
8. (France) Thom Gicquel / Delphine Delrue (Final)

=== Finals ===
Semi-finals
5 | (South Korea) Seo Seung-jae (South Korea) Chae Yoo-jung | 21 | 21
(Malaysia) Tan Kian Meng (Malaysia) Lai Pei Jing | 19 | 11
(Malaysia) Chen Tang Jie (Malaysia) Toh Ee Wei | 16 | 13
8 | (France) Thom Gicquel (France) Delphine Delrue | 21 | 21

Final
5 | (South Korea) Seo Seung-jae (South Korea) Chae Yoo-jung | 21 | 21
8 | (France) Thom Gicquel (France) Delphine Delrue | 19 | 12

=== Top half ===
==== Section 1 ====
First round
1 | (China) Zheng SW (China) Huang YQ | 21 | 21
(Germany) M Lamsfuß (Germany) I Lohau | 15 | 16
(Indonesia) D Ferdinansyah (Indonesia) G E Widjaja | 21 | 21
(Chinese Taipei) Yang P-hs (Chinese Taipei) Hu L-f | 16 | 14
5 | (South Korea) Seo S-j (South Korea) Chae Y-j | 21 | 24
(Denmark) M Christiansen (Denmark) A Bøje | 14 | 22
(United States) V Chiu (United States) J Gai | 8 | 15
(Japan) K Yamashita (Japan) N Shinoya | 21 | 21

Second round
1 | (China) Zheng SW (China) Huang YQ | 21 | 21
(Indonesia) D Ferdinansyah (Indonesia) G E Widjaja | 5 | 17
5 | (South Korea) Seo S-j (South Korea) Chae Y-j | 8 | 21 | 21
(Japan) K Yamashita (Japan) N Shinoya | 21 | 18 | 19

Quarter-finals
1 | (China) Zheng SW (China) Huang YQ | 21 | 13 | 17
5 | (South Korea) Seo S-j (South Korea) Chae Y-j | 17 | 21 | 21

==== Section 2 ====
First round
4 | (Thailand) D Puavaranukroh (Thailand) S Taerattanachai | 21 | 21
PFR | (England) G Mairs (England) J Mairs | 14 | 8
(Chinese Taipei) Chang K-c (Chinese Taipei) Lee C-c | 19 | 21 | 19
(Indonesia) R Rivaldy (Indonesia) P H Mentari | 21 | 16 | 21
7 | (China) Jiang ZB (China) Wei YX | 16 | 21 | 16
(Indonesia) P Jordan (Indonesia) M D Oktavianti | 21 | 12 | 21
(Malaysia) Goh S H (Malaysia) S J Lai | 23 | 15
(Malaysia) Tan K M (Malaysia) Lai P J | 25 | 21

Second round
4 | (Thailand) D Puavaranukroh (Thailand) S Taerattanachai | 21 | 21
(Indonesia) R Rivaldy (Indonesia) P H Mentari | 16 | 13
(Indonesia) P Jordan (Indonesia) M D Oktavianti | 21 | 19 | 12
(Malaysia) Tan K M (Malaysia) Lai P J | 18 | 21 | 21

Quarter-finals
4 | (Thailand) D Puavaranukroh (Thailand) S Taerattanachai | 18 | 19
(Malaysia) Tan K M (Malaysia) Lai P J | 21 | 21

=== Bottom half ===
==== Section 3 ====
First round
(Malaysia) Chen T J (Malaysia) Toh E W | 21 | 21
(India) R Kapoor (India) S Reddy | 15 | 16
(Japan) Y Kaneko (Japan) M Matsutomo | 17 | 19
6 | (South Korea) Kim W-h (South Korea) Jeong N-e | 21 | 21
(Netherlands) R Tabeling (Netherlands) S Piek | 13 | 13
(Chinese Taipei) Ye H-w (Chinese Taipei) Lee C-h | 21 | 21
(Singapore) T Hee (Singapore) J Tan | 17 | 12
3 | (China) Feng YZ (China) Huang DP | 21 | 21

Second round
(Malaysia) Chen T J (Malaysia) Toh E W | 21 | 15 | 21
6 | (South Korea) Kim W-h (South Korea) Jeong N-e | 15 | 21 | 18
(Chinese Taipei) Ye H-w (Chinese Taipei) Lee C-h | 21 | 21
3 | (China) Feng YZ (China) Huang DP | 18 | 19

Quarter-finals
(Malaysia) Chen T J (Malaysia) Toh E W | 21 | 13 | 21
(Chinese Taipei) Ye H-w (Chinese Taipei) Lee C-h | 15 | 21 | 16

==== Section 4 ====
First round
(Thailand) S Jomkoh (Thailand) S Paewsampran | 19 | 18
(Japan) H Midorikawa (Japan) N Saito | 21 | 21
(China) Cheng X (China) Chen FH | 10 | 19
8 | (France) T Gicquel (France) D Delrue | 21 | 21
(Indonesia) R N Kusharjanto (Indonesia) L A Kusumawati | 16 | 12
(Hong Kong) Tang C M (Hong Kong) Tse Y S | 21 | 21
(Hong Kong) Lee C H (Hong Kong) Ng T Y | 23 | 18 | 11
2 | (Japan) Y Watanabe (Japan) A Higashino | 21 | 21 | 21

Second round
(Japan) H Midorikawa (Japan) N Saito | 19 | 17
8 | (France) T Gicquel (France) D Delrue | 21 | 21
(Hong Kong) Tang C M (Hong Kong) Tse Y S | 14 | 17
2 | (Japan) Y Watanabe (Japan) A Higashino | 21 | 21

Quarter-finals
8 | (France) T Gicquel (France) D Delrue | 22 | 21
2 | (Japan) Y Watanabe (Japan) A Higashino | 20 | 14

| Preceded by 2019 China Open | China Open | Succeeded by 2024 China Open |
| Preceded by 2023 Australian Open | BWF World Tour; 2023 BWF season | Succeeded by 2023 Hong Kong Open; 2023 Vietnam Open |
