= 2018 Macau Open (badminton) =

2018 badminton tournament

Tournament details
- Dates: 30 October – 4 November
- Level: Super 300
- Total prize money: US$150,000
- Venue: Tap Seac Multi-sports Pavilion
- Location: Macau, China

Champions
- Men's singles: (South Korea) Lee Hyun-il
- Women's singles: (Canada) Michelle Li
- Men's doubles: (South Korea) Kim Gi-jung (South Korea) Lee Yong-dae
- Women's doubles: (Malaysia) Vivian Hoo Kah Mun (Malaysia) Yap Cheng Wen
- Mixed doubles: (Hong Kong) Tang Chun Man (Hong Kong) Tse Ying Suet

The 2018 Macau Open was a badminton tournament which took place at Tap Seac Multisport Pavilion Macau in Macau from 30 October to 4 November 2018 and had a total prize of $150,000.

== Tournament ==
The 2018 Macau Open was the twenty-second tournament of the 2018 BWF World Tour and also part of the Macau Open championships, which had been held since 2006. This tournament was organized by Badminton Federation of Macau and sanctioned by the BWF.

=== Venue ===
This international tournament was held at Tap Seac Multisport Pavilion Macau in Macau.

=== Point distribution ===
Below is the point distribution table for each phase of the tournament based on the BWF points system for the BWF World Tour Super 300 event.

Winner	Runner-up	3/4	5/8	9/16	17/32	33/64	65/128
7,000	5,950	4,900	3,850	2,750	1,670	660	320

=== Prize money ===
The total prize money for this year's tournament was US$150,000. Distribution of prize money was in accordance with BWF regulations.

Event	Winner	Finals	Semi-finals	Quarter-finals	Last 16
Singles	$11,250	$5,700	$2,175	$900	$525
Doubles	$11,850	$5,700	$2,100	$1,087.50	$562.50

== Men's singles ==
=== Seeds ===
1. (Hong Kong) Ng Ka Long (quarter-finals)
2. (Hong Kong) Wong Wing Ki (second round)
3. (South Korea) Lee Hyun-il (champion)
4. (Malaysia) Liew Daren (withdrew)
5. (Indonesia) Ihsan Maulana Mustofa (withdrew)
6. (Japan) Yu Igarashi (first round)
7. (Malaysia) Chong Wei Feng (second round)
8. (Israel) Misha Zilberman (second round)

=== Wild card ===
Badminton Federation of Macau awarded a wild card entry to Pui Pang Fong of Macau.

=== Finals ===
Semi-finals
Q4	(China) Zhou Zeqi	21	13	21
PFQ	(Chinese Taipei) Lu Chia-hung	19	21	14
3	(South Korea) Lee Hyun-il	18	21	21
(Thailand) Sitthikom Thammasin	21	17	4

Final
Q4	(China) Zhou Zeqi	9	19
3	(South Korea) Lee Hyun-il	21	21

=== Top half ===
==== Section 1 ====
First Round
1	(Hong Kong) Ng K L	21	21
Q2	(Indonesia) C A Dwi Wardoyo	9	14
(Hong Kong) Lee C Y	21	21
(Indonesia) P A Maulana	18	14
8	(Israel) M Zilberman	21	21
WC	(Macau) Pui P F	4	12
Q4	(China) Zhou ZQ	21	21
(Russia) V Malkov	15	18

Second Round
1	(Hong Kong) Ng K L	21	13	21
(Hong Kong) Lee C Y	13	21	9
8	(Israel) M Zilberman	15	16
Q4	(China) Zhou ZQ	21	21

Quarter-finals
1	(Hong Kong) Ng K L	15	21	19
Q4	(China) Zhou ZQ	21	14	21

==== Section 2 ====
First Round
PFQ	(Thailand) A Namkul	21	17	12
(Japan) R Takeshita	16	21	21
(Indonesia) S H Rhustavito	21	15	18
PFQ	(Chinese Taipei) Lu C-h	12	21	21
7	(Malaysia) Chong W F	21	21
Q3	(Chinese Taipei) Yang C-c	16	9
(China) Zhao JP	15	21	21
(Indonesia) S D Kuncoro	21	12	17

Second Round
(Japan) R Takeshita	21	13	11
PFQ	(Chinese Taipei) Lu C-h	12	21	21
7	(Malaysia) Chong W F	21	19	16
(China) Zhao JP	11	21	21

Quarter-finals
PFQ	(Chinese Taipei) Lu C-h	21	22
(China) Zhao JP	16	20

=== Bottom half ===
==== Section 3 ====
First Round
(China) Lu GZ	21	21
PFQ	(India) S Jaiswal	11	6
(Malaysia) I Zulkarnain	24	21	21
6	(Japan) Y Igarashi	26	16	13
(Thailand) T Saensomboonsuk	13	21	21
(India) R. M. V. Gurusaidutt	21	14	16
(Hong Kong) Hu Y	18	11
3	(South Korea) Lee H-i	21	21

Second Round
(China) Lu GZ	21	21
(Malaysia) I Zulkarnain	18	13
(Thailand) T Saensomboonsuk	21	9	15
3	(South Korea) Lee H-i	19	21	21

Quarter-finals
(China) Lu GZ	21	15	20
3	(South Korea) Lee H-i	14	21	22

==== Section 4 ====
First Round
(Thailand) S Thammasin	21	21
(South Korea) Heo K-h	10	16
(Chinese Taipei) Lin Y-h	21	19	21
PFQ	(Canada) XD Sheng	12	21	18
Q1	(India) M Manjunath	12	15
(Indonesia) F A Kholik	21	21
PFQ	(Japan) K Watanabe	16	16
2	(Hong Kong) Wong W K	21	21

Second Round
(Thailand) S Thammasin	21	15	21
(Chinese Taipei) Lin Y-h	14	21	16
(Indonesia) F A Kholik	21	21
2	(Hong Kong) Wong W K	17	18

Quarter-finals
(Thailand) S Thammasin	25	21
(Indonesia) F A Kholik	23	10

== Women's singles ==
=== Seeds ===
1. (Canada) Michelle Li (champion)
2. (Japan) Minatsu Mitani (second round)
3. (Hong Kong) Cheung Ngan Yi (semi-finals)
4. (Chinese Taipei) Pai Yu-po (second round)
5. (China) Han Yue (final)
6. (Hong Kong) Yip Pui Yin (first round)
7. (Malaysia) Soniia Cheah Su Ya (quarter-finals)
8. (China) Zhang Yiman (first round)

=== Wild card ===
Badminton Federation of Macau awarded a wild card entry to Ng Weng Chi of Macau.

=== Finals ===
Semi-finals
1	(Canada) Michelle Li	21	8	21
(Japan) Ayumi Mine	15	21	13
3	(Hong Kong) Cheung Ngan Yi	20	23	7
5	(China) Han Yue	22	21	21

Final
1	(Canada) Michelle Li	23	21	21
5	(China) Han Yue	25	17	15

=== Top half ===
==== Section 1 ====
First Round
1	(Canada) M Li	21	21
(Chinese Taipei) Sung S-y	16	19
(Indonesia) Y Y Susanto	13	21	13
(Thailand) S Katethong	21	19	21
6	(Hong Kong) Yip P Y	13	6
(China) Li XR	21	21
(Chinese Taipei) Chen S-y	16	21	13
(South Korea) Lee S-y	21	15	21

Second Round
1	(Canada) M Li	21	15	21
(Thailand) S Katethong	16	21	12
(China) Li XR	21	10	21
(South Korea) Lee S-y	19	21	10

Quarter-finals
1	(Canada) M Li	21	21
(China) Li XR	15	18

==== Section 2 ====
First Round
4	(Chinese Taipei) Pai Y-p	21	21
PFQ	(United States) I Zhong	19	11
(United States) C Pan	14	16
(Indonesia) L A Mainaky	21	21
8	(China) Zhang YM	11	11
(Japan) A Mine	21	21
(Malaysia) Kisona S	12	15
PFQ	(Japan) H Suzuki	21	21

Second Round
4	(Chinese Taipei) Pai Y-p	6^{r}
(Indonesia) L A Mainaky	11
(Japan) A Mine	16	21	11
PFQ	(Japan) H Suzuki	21	9	4^{r}

Quarter-finals
(Indonesia) L A Mainaky	10	21	10
(Japan) A Mine	21	17	21

=== Bottom half ===
==== Section 3 ====
First Round
Q2	(South Korea) Sim Y-j	21	21
(South Korea) Kim G-e	9	17
Q4	(Chinese Taipei) Liang T-y	15	22
7	(Malaysia) S Cheah S Y	21	24
Q1	(Hong Kong) Cheung Y M	22	12	21
(Malaysia) Lee Y Y	20	21	23
(South Korea) Jeon J-i	17	10
3	(Hong Kong) Cheung N Y	21	21

Second Round
Q2	(South Korea) Sim Y-j	16	19
7	(Malaysia) S Cheah S Y	21	21
(Malaysia) Lee Y Y	9	19
3	(Hong Kong) Cheung N Y	21	21

Quarter-finals
7	(Malaysia) S Cheah S Y	19	20
3	(Hong Kong) Cheung N Y	21	22

==== Section 4 ====
First Round
(Chinese Taipei) Chiang Y-l	13	7
(India) R Das	21	21
WC	(Macau) Ng W C	7	7
5	(China) Han Y	21	21
(Hong Kong) Deng X	21	16	13
Q3	(China) Ji ST	16	21	21
(India) S U R Chukka	12	8^{r}
2	(Japan) M Mitani	21	16

Second Round
(India) R Das	8	21	7
5	(China) Han Y	21	15	21
Q3	(China) Ji ST	21	21
2	(Japan) M Mitani	12	12

Quarter-finals
5	(China) Han Y	21	21
Q3	(China) Ji ST	12	16

== Men's doubles ==
=== Seeds ===
1. (Chinese Taipei) Chen Hung-ling / Wang Chi-lin (quarter-finals)
2. (Chinese Taipei) Liao Min-chun / Su Ching-heng (second round)
3. (China) Han Chengkai / Zhou Haodong (first round)
4. (Indonesia) Wahyu Nayaka / Ade Yusuf Santoso (first round)
5. (Chinese Taipei) Lu Ching-yao / Yang Po-han (semi-finals)
6. (Indonesia) Akbar Bintang Cahyono / Muhammad Reza Pahlevi Isfahani (first round)
7. (Thailand) Tinn Isriyanet / Tanupat Viriyangkura (first round)
8. (Malaysia) Mohamad Arif Abdul Latif / Nur Mohd Azriyn Ayub (quarter-finals)

=== Wild card ===
Badminton Federation of Macau awarded a wild card entry to Che Pui Ngai / Leong Iok Chong of Macau.

=== Finals ===
Semi-finals
(South Korea) Kim Gi-jung (South Korea) Lee Yong-dae	18	21	25
5	(Chinese Taipei) Lu Ching-yao (Chinese Taipei) Yang Po-han	21	8	23
(South Korea) Ko Sung-hyun (South Korea) Shin Baek-cheol	21	21
(Chinese Taipei) Chang Ko-chi (Chinese Taipei) Lu Chia-pin	14	15

Final
(South Korea) Kim Gi-jung (South Korea) Lee Yong-dae	17	21	21
(South Korea) Ko Sung-hyun (South Korea) Shin Baek-cheol	21	13	19

=== Top half ===
==== Section 1 ====
First Round
1	(Chinese Taipei) Chen H-l (Chinese Taipei) Wang C-l	21	21
(India) T Kona (Malaysia) Lim K W	12	15
Q4	(Thailand) C Charoenkitamorn (Thailand) C Nobsamrong	21	15	19
Q3	(Malaysia) Chen T J (Malaysia) Man W C	13	21	21
6	(Indonesia) A B Cahyono (Indonesia) M R P Isfahani	13	21	18
(Malaysia) Chooi K M (Malaysia) Low J S	21	18	21
(South Korea) Kim G-j (South Korea) Lee Y-d	21	21
(Hong Kong) Ho W L (Hong Kong) Mak H C	17	18

Second Round
1	(Chinese Taipei) Chen H-l (Chinese Taipei) Wang C-l	21	21
Q3	(Malaysia) Chen T J (Malaysia) Man W C	16	13
(Malaysia) Chooi K M (Malaysia) Low J S	18	21	18
(South Korea) Kim G-j (South Korea) Lee Y-d	21	19	21

Quarter-finals
1	(Chinese Taipei) Chen H-l (Chinese Taipei) Wang C-l	16	15
(South Korea) Kim G-j (South Korea) Lee Y-d	21	21

==== Section 2 ====
First Round
3	(China) Han CK (China) Zhou HD	19	13
Q2	(South Korea) Kim S-r (Malaysia) Tan B H	21	21
PFQ	(Hong Kong) Lam W L (Hong Kong) Li K H	11	16
(Chinese Taipei) Lee S-m (Chinese Taipei) Yang P-hs	21	21
5	(Chinese Taipei) Lu C-y (Chinese Taipei) Yang P-ha	21	21
(Thailand) I Apisuk (Thailand) N Phuangphuapet	16	18
(Malaysia) Goh S F (Malaysia) N Izzuddin	21	19	21
(Hong Kong) Chang T C (Hong Kong) Yeung M N	18	21	16

Second Round
Q2	(South Korea) Kim S-r (Malaysia) Tan B H	15	22
(Chinese Taipei) Lee S-m (Chinese Taipei) Yang P-hs	21	24
5	(Chinese Taipei) Lu C-y (Chinese Taipei) Yang P-ha	24	19	21
(Malaysia) Goh S F (Malaysia) N Izzuddin	22	21	11

Quarter-finals
(Chinese Taipei) Lee S-m (Chinese Taipei) Yang P-hs	15	21	13
5	(Chinese Taipei) Lu C-y (Chinese Taipei) Yang P-ha	21	16	21

=== Bottom half ===
==== Section 3 ====
First Round
(South Korea) Kim J-h (South Korea) Park K-h	21	21
(Chinese Taipei) Lee F-c (Chinese Taipei) Lee F-j	15	16
WC	(Macau) Che P N (Macau) Leong I C	8	7
8	(Malaysia) M Arif A L (Malaysia) N M Azriyn A	21	21
(Hong Kong) Y Chung (Hong Kong) Tam C H	21	21	21
(Indonesia) S K Gutama (Indonesia) F W Putra	19	23	13
(South Korea) Ko S-h (South Korea) Shin B-c	21	16	21
4	(Indonesia) W Nayaka (Indonesia) A Y Santoso	14	21	13

Second Round
(South Korea) Kim J-h (South Korea) Park K-h	19	13
8	(Malaysia) M Arif A L (Malaysia) N M Azriyn A	21	21
(Hong Kong) Y Chung (Hong Kong) Tam C H	12	15
(South Korea) Ko S-h (South Korea) Shin B-c	21	21

Quarter-finals
8	(Malaysia) M Arif A L (Malaysia) N M Azriyn A	10	15
(South Korea) Ko S-h (South Korea) Shin B-c	21	21

==== Section 4 ====
First Round
(Chinese Taipei) Chang K-c (Chinese Taipei) Lu C-p	21	21
Q1	(China) Chen SH (China) Fan QY	18	16
(Chinese Taipei) Lin C-y (Chinese Taipei) Yang M-t	21	23
7	(Thailand) T Isriyanet (Thailand) T Viriyangkura	16	21
(Chinese Taipei) Lin S-k (Chinese Taipei) Tseng M-h	12	14
(Japan) K Matsui (Japan) Y Takeuchi	21	21
PFQ	(Chinese Taipei) Kan C-y (Chinese Taipei) Liao C-h	11	11
2	(Chinese Taipei) Liao M-c (Chinese Taipei) Su C-h	21	21

Second Round
(Chinese Taipei) Chang K-c (Chinese Taipei) Lu C-p	21	19	23
(Chinese Taipei) Lin C-y (Chinese Taipei) Yang M-t	17	21	21
(Japan) K Matsui (Japan) Y Takeuchi	19	21	21
2	(Chinese Taipei) Liao M-c (Chinese Taipei) Su C-h	21	19	18

Quarter-finals
(Chinese Taipei) Chang K-c (Chinese Taipei) Lu C-p	18	21	21
(Japan) K Matsui (Japan) Y Takeuchi	21	10	15

== Women's doubles ==
=== Seeds ===
1. (Japan) Ayako Sakuramoto / Yukiko Takahata (quarter-finals)
2. (China) Tang Jinhua / Yu Xiaohan (withdrew)
3. (Thailand) Chayanit Chaladchalam / Phataimas Muenwong (first round)
4. (Japan) Nami Matsuyama / Chiharu Shida (semi-finals)

=== Finals ===
Semi-finals
(Japan) Misato Aratama (Japan) Akane Watanabe	17	21	21
(Indonesia) Yulfira Barkah (Indonesia) Jauza Fadhila Sugiarto	21	14	15
4	(Japan) Nami Matsuyama (Japan) Chiharu Shida	16	17
(Malaysia) Vivian Hoo (Malaysia) Yap Cheng Wen	21	21

Final
(Japan) Misato Aratama (Japan) Akane Watanabe	15	20
(Malaysia) Vivian Hoo (Malaysia) Yap Cheng Wen	21	22

=== Top half ===
==== Section 1 ====
First Round
(Malaysia) Lim C S (Malaysia) Tan S J
(Indonesia) T O Kusumah (Indonesia) V A Sukoco	w	/	o
(Hong Kong) Ng S Y (Hong Kong) Wu Y T	12	12
(Japan) M Aratama (Japan) A Watanabe	21	21
(Thailand) S Kanchanasaka (Thailand) N Sukklad	21	21
(Macau) Ao I K (Macau) Kuan C L	17	13

Second Round
1	(Japan) A Sakuramoto (Japan) Y Takahata	21	21
(Indonesia) T O Kusumah (Indonesia) V A Sukoco	16	11
(Japan) M Aratama (Japan) A Watanabe	21	21
(Thailand) S Kanchanasaka (Thailand) N Sukklad	14	9

Quarter-finals
1	(Japan) A Sakuramoto (Japan) Y Takahata	13	14
(Japan) M Aratama (Japan) A Watanabe	21	21

==== Section 2 ====
First Round
3	(Thailand) C Chaladchalam (Thailand) P Muenwong	21	14	19
(Chinese Taipei) Chang H-t (Chinese Taipei) Cheng C-y	16	21	21
(Indonesia) Y Barkah (Indonesia) J F Sugiarto	21	21
(Chinese Taipei) Chen S-y (Chinese Taipei) Peng L-t	9	18
(Indonesia) P H Mentari (Indonesia) R E Putri Sari	15	17
(Chinese Taipei) Kuo Y-w (Chinese Taipei) Lin Y-c	21	21
(Thailand) R Iamratanamaetheekul (Thailand) T Kaweenuntavong	9	18
(Indonesia) W O Kandow (Indonesia) V Putri	21	21

Second Round
(Chinese Taipei) Chang H-t (Chinese Taipei) Cheng C-y	12	16
(Indonesia) Y Barkah (Indonesia) J F Sugiarto	21	21
(Chinese Taipei) Kuo Y-w (Chinese Taipei) Lin Y-c	21	10	20
(Indonesia) W O Kandow (Indonesia) V Putri	14	21	22

Quarter-finals
(Indonesia) Y Barkah (Indonesia) J F Sugiarto	23	21
(Indonesia) W O Kandow (Indonesia) V Putri	21	10

=== Bottom half ===
==== Section 3 ====
First Round
(Chinese Taipei) Hsu Y-c (Chinese Taipei) Hu L-f	22	25
(China) Xu Y (China) Yan CX	20	23
(Thailand) S Chumnibannakarn (Thailand) K Dubthuk	w	/	o
(Chinese Taipei) Hung S-h (Chinese Taipei) Yu C-h
(Chinese Taipei) Lin W-c (Chinese Taipei) Wu T-j	14	19
(Hong Kong) Ng W Y (Hong Kong) Yeung N T	21	21
(Hong Kong) Fan K Y (Hong Kong) Wong C C	5	8
4	(Japan) N Matsuyama (Japan) C Shida	21	21

Second Round
(Chinese Taipei) Hsu Y-c (Chinese Taipei) Hu L-f	21	21
(Thailand) S Chumnibannakarn (Thailand) K Dubthuk	7	17
(Hong Kong) Ng W Y (Hong Kong) Yeung N T	21	13	12
4	(Japan) N Matsuyama (Japan) C Shida	18	21	21

Quarter-finals
(Chinese Taipei) Hsu Y-c (Chinese Taipei) Hu L-f	21	15	18
4	(Japan) N Matsuyama (Japan) C Shida	17	21	21

==== Section 4 ====
First Round
(Malaysia) V Hoo (Malaysia) Yap C W	21	21
(Macau) Gong X X (Macau) Ng W C	8	14
(Chinese Taipei) Chang C-h (Chinese Taipei) Yang C-t	21	21
(United States) E Kan (United States) I Zhong	12	8
(Indonesia) L A Mainaky (Indonesia) R A Riodingin	8	13
(Hong Kong) Ng T Y (Hong Kong) Yuen S Y	21	21
(Chinese Taipei) Cheng Y-p (Chinese Taipei) Lin J-y	w	/	o
2	(China) Tang JH (China) Yu XH

Second Round
(Malaysia) V Hoo (Malaysia) Yap C W	21	21
(Chinese Taipei) Chang C-h (Chinese Taipei) Yang C-t	14	15
(Hong Kong) Ng T Y (Hong Kong) Yuen S Y	21	21
(Chinese Taipei) Cheng Y-p (Chinese Taipei) Lin J-y	16	16

Quarter-finals
(Malaysia) V Hoo (Malaysia) Yap C W	21	21
(Hong Kong) Ng T Y (Hong Kong) Yuen S Y	11	13

== Mixed doubles ==
=== Seeds ===
1. (Hong Kong) Tang Chun Man / Tse Ying Suet (champions)
2. (Hong Kong) Lee Chun Hei / Chau Hoi Wah (final)
3. (Hong Kong) Chang Tak Ching / Ng Wing Yung (first round)
4. (Malaysia) Chen Tang Jie / Peck Yen Wei (second round)
5. (Thailand) Nipitphon Phuangphuapet / Savitree Amitrapai (quarter-finals)
6. (Indonesia) Akbar Bintang Cahyono / Winny Oktavina Kandow (semi-finals)
7. (Indonesia) Alfian Eko Prasetya / Marsheilla Gischa Islami (quarter-finals)
8. (Chinese Taipei) Chang Ko-chi / Cheng Chi-ya (second round)

=== Wild card ===
Badminton Federation of Macau awarded a wild card entry to Che Pui Ngai / Gong Xue Xin of Macau.

=== Finals ===
Semi-finals
1	(Hong Kong) Tang Chun Man (Hong Kong) Tse Ying Suet	21	19	21
(Malaysia) Hoo Pang Ron (Malaysia) Cheah Yee See	16	21	11
6	(Indonesia) Akbar Bintang Cahyono (Indonesia) Winny Oktavina Kandow	20	10
2	(Hong Kong) Lee Chun Hei (Hong Kong) Chau Hoi Wah	22	21

Final
1	(Hong Kong) Tang Chun Man (Hong Kong) Tse Ying Suet	21	21
2	(Hong Kong) Lee Chun Hei (Hong Kong) Chau Hoi Wah	14	15

=== Top half ===
==== Section 1 ====
First Round
1	(Hong Kong) Tang C M (Hong Kong) Tse Y S	21	21
(Israel) M Zilberman (Israel) S Zilberman	13	17
(Chinese Taipei) Yang P-hs (Chinese Taipei) Hu L-f	21	21
Q3	(Thailand) C Nobsamrong (Thailand) T Kaweenuntavong	9	17
7	(Indonesia) A E Prasetya (Indonesia) M G Islami	21	21
(Thailand) P Thongnuam (Thailand) K Dubthuk	19	18
Q1	(Thailand) C Charoenkitamorn (Thailand) R Iamratanamaetheekul	21	17	23
(Chinese Taipei) Lin C-y (Chinese Taipei) Lin W-c	10	21	21

Second Round
1	(Hong Kong) Tang C M (Hong Kong) Tse Y S	18	21	21
(Chinese Taipei) Yang P-hs (Chinese Taipei) Hu L-f	21	18	17
7	(Indonesia) A E Prasetya (Indonesia) M G Islami	21	21
Q1	(Thailand) C Charoenkitamorn (Thailand) R Iamratanamaetheekul	10	10

Quarter-finals
1	(Hong Kong) Tang C M (Hong Kong) Tse Y S	21	21
7	(Indonesia) A E Prasetya (Indonesia) M G Islami	19	12

==== Section 2 ====
First Round
3	(Hong Kong) Chang T C (Hong Kong) Ng W Y	21	18	10
(Malaysia) Hoo P R (Malaysia) Cheah Y S	19	21	21
(Chinese Taipei) Yang M-t (Chinese Taipei) Kuo Y-w	16	15
Q4	(Thailand) T Viriyangkura (Thailand) K Sudjaipraparat	21	21
8	(Chinese Taipei) Chang K-c (Chinese Taipei) Cheng C-y	18	21	21
(Hong Kong) Yeung M N (Hong Kong) Ng T Y	21	16	17
(Hong Kong) Ho W L (Hong Kong) Yuen S Y	15	15
(Indonesia) R Alexander (Indonesia) A Saufika	21	21

Second Round
(Malaysia) Hoo P R (Malaysia) Cheah Y S	22	21
Q4	(Thailand) T Viriyangkura (Thailand) K Sudjaipraparat	20	17
8	(Chinese Taipei) Chang K-c (Chinese Taipei) Cheng C-y	15	19
(Indonesia) R Alexander (Indonesia) A Saufika	21	21

Quarter-finals
(Malaysia) Hoo P R (Malaysia) Cheah Y S	21	21
(Indonesia) R Alexander (Indonesia) A Saufika	16	6

=== Bottom half ===
==== Section 3 ====
First Round
WC	(Macau) Che P N (Macau) Gong X X	10	15
(Chinese Taipei) Po L-w (Chinese Taipei) Chang C-h	21	21
(China) Chen SH (China) Yan CX	12	21	13
6	(Indonesia) A B Cahyono (Indonesia) W O Kandow	21	19	21
(Hong Kong) Mak H C (Hong Kong) Yeung N T	20	21	21
(Chinese Taipei) Lee F-j (Chinese Taipei) Chang H-t	22	11	13
(China) Fan QY (China) Xu Y	16	10
4	(Malaysia) Chen T J (Malaysia) Peck Y W	21	21

Second Round
(Chinese Taipei) Po L-w (Chinese Taipei) Chang C-h	12	13
6	(Indonesia) A B Cahyono (Indonesia) W O Kandow	21	21
(Hong Kong) Mak H C (Hong Kong) Yeung N T	21	21
4	(Malaysia) Chen T J (Malaysia) Peck Y W	8	17

Quarter-finals
6	(Indonesia) A B Cahyono (Indonesia) W O Kandow	22	21
(Hong Kong) Mak H C (Hong Kong) Yeung N T	20	16

==== Section 4 ====
First Round
(Hong Kong) Y Chung (Hong Kong) Wu Y T	20	13
Q2	(Hong Kong) Yeung S C (Hong Kong) Fan K Y	22	21
(Malaysia) M Arif A L (Indonesia) R A Riodingin	14	23	18
5	(Thailand) N Phuangphuapet (Thailand) S Amitrapai	21	21	21
(Chinese Taipei) Tseng M-h (Chinese Taipei) Lin J-y	21	21
(United States) M Fogarty (United States) I Zhong	11	9
(Chinese Taipei) Lin S-k (Chinese Taipei) Cheng Y-p	21	12
2	(Hong Kong) Lee C H (Hong Kong) Chau H W	23	21

Second Round
Q2	(Hong Kong) Yeung S C (Hong Kong) Fan K Y	13	12
5	(Thailand) N Phuangphuapet (Thailand) S Amitrapai	21	21
(Chinese Taipei) Tseng M-h (Chinese Taipei) Lin J-y	13	21	13
2	(Hong Kong) Lee C H (Hong Kong) Chau H W	21	19	21

Quarter-finals
5	(Thailand) N Phuangphuapet (Thailand) S Amitrapai	16	21	13
2	(Hong Kong) Lee C H (Hong Kong) Chau H W	21	16	21

Preceded by 2018 French Open	BWF World Tour; 2018 BWF season	Succeeded by 2018 SaarLorLux Open
