= Misato Aratama =

Japanese badminton player (born 1991)

Personal information
- Born: 6 April 1991 (age 35) Aichi Prefecture, Japan

Sport
- Country: Japan
- Sport: Badminton
- Handedness: Right

Women's & mixed doubles
- Highest ranking: 26 (WD 15 March 2018); 189 (XD 18 June 2015)
- BWF profile
Medal record
Women's badminton
Representing Japan
East Asian Games
Bronze medal – third place	2013 Tianjin	Women's team
Asian Junior Championships
Bronze medal – third place	2009 Kuala Lumpur	Mixed team

Misato Aratama (新玉 美郷, Aratama Misato; born 6 April 1991) is a Japanese badminton player.

== Achievements ==
=== BWF World Tour (1 title, 1 runner-up) ===
The BWF World Tour, which was announced on 19 March 2017 and implemented in 2018, is a series of elite badminton tournaments sanctioned by the Badminton World Federation (BWF). The BWF World Tour is divided into levels of World Tour Finals, Super 1000, Super 750, Super 500, Super 300 (part of the HSBC World Tour), and the BWF Tour Super 100.

Women's doubles
Year	Tournament	Level	Partner	Opponent	Score	Result	Ref.
2018	Vietnam Open	Super 100	(Japan) Akane Watanabe	(Japan) Nami Matsuyama (Japan) Chiharu Shida	21–18, 21–19	(gold) Winner	
2018	Macau Open	Super 300	(Japan) Akane Watanabe	(Malaysia) Vivian Hoo (Malaysia) Yap Cheng Wen	15–21, 20–22	(silver) Runner-up	

=== BWF Grand Prix ===
The BWF Grand Prix had two levels, the Grand Prix and Grand Prix Gold. It was a series of badminton tournaments sanctioned by the Badminton World Federation (BWF) and played between 2007 and 2017.

Mixed doubles
Year	Tournament	Partner	Opponent	Score	Result	Ref.
2014	Russian Open	(Japan) Ryota Taohata	(Russia) Ivan Sozonov (Russia) Olga Morozova	21–12, 21–10	(gold) Winner	

BWF Grand Prix tournament

=== BWF International Challenge/Series ===
Women's doubles
Year	Tournament	Partner	Opponent	Score	Result	Ref.
2013	Austrian International	(Japan) Megumi Taruno	(Malaysia) Chow Mei Kuan (Malaysia) Lee Meng Yean	21–14, 22–20	(gold) Winner	
2016	Finnish Open	(Japan) Akane Watanabe	(Netherlands) Samantha Barning (Netherlands) Iris Tabeling	21–12, 21–17	(gold) Winner	
2017	Finnish Open	(Japan) Akane Watanabe	(Japan) Chisato Hoshi (Japan) Naru Shinoya	21–18, 21–13	(gold) Winner	
2017	Spanish International	(Japan) Akane Watanabe	(Japan) Ayako Sakuramoto (Japan) Yukiko Takahata	10–21, 15–21	(silver) Runner-up	
2017	Malaysia International	(Japan) Akane Watanabe	(Thailand) Kittipak Dubthuk (Thailand) Natcha Saengchote	21–18, 21–15	(gold) Winner	

BWF International Challenge tournament
