= Shesar Hiren Rhustavito =

Indonesian badminton player (born 1994)

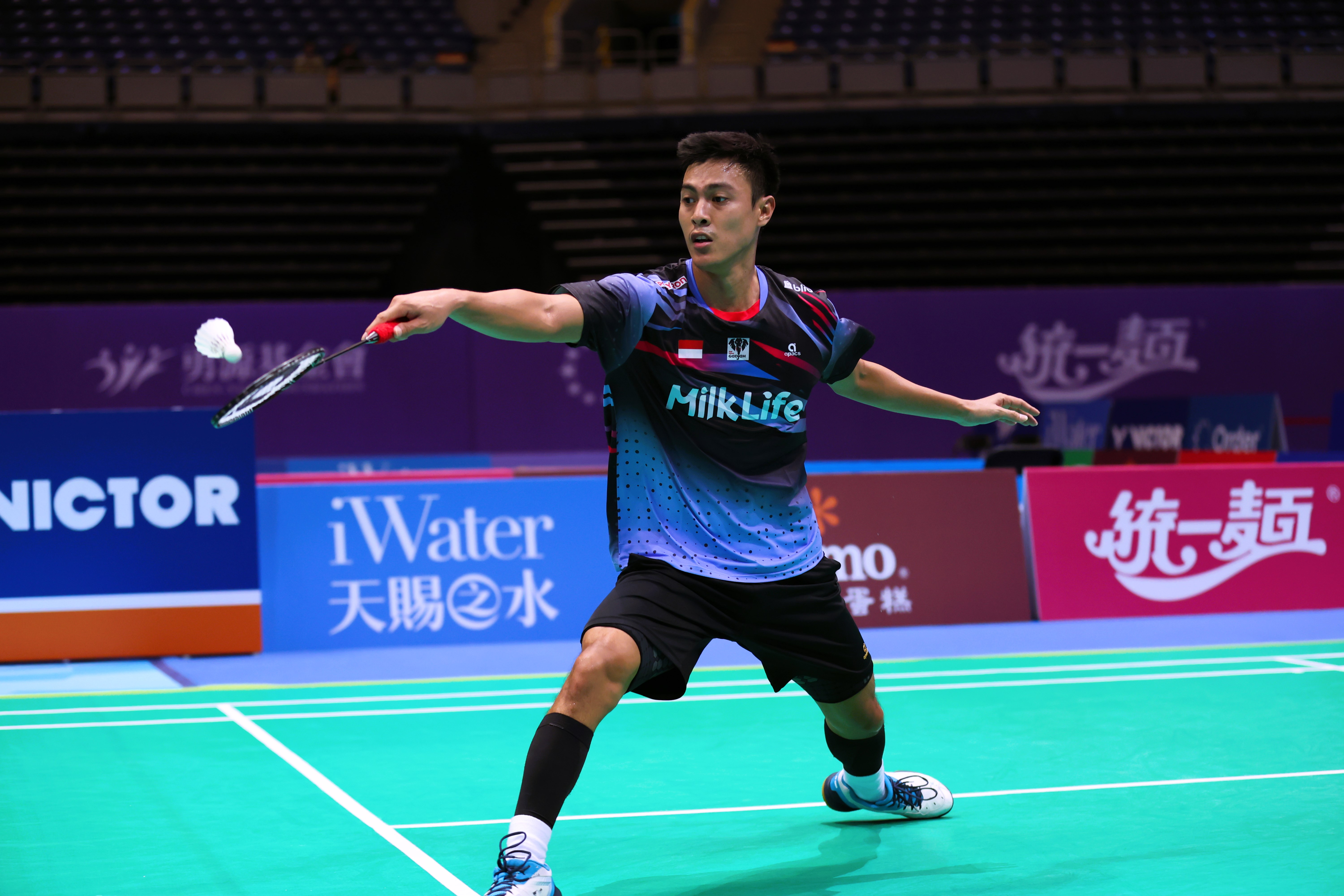
- Rhustavito at the 2024 Kaohsiung Masters

Personal information
- Born: 3 March 1994 (age 32) Sukoharjo, Central Java, Indonesia
- Height: 1.78 m (5 ft 10 in)

Sport
- Country: Indonesia
- Sport: Badminton
- Handedness: Right

Men's singles
- Career record: 179 wins, 116 losses
- Highest ranking: 17 (10 March 2020)
- Current ranking: 99 (18 March 2025)
- BWF profile
Medal record
Men's badminton
Representing Indonesia
Thomas Cup
Gold medal – first place	2020 Aarhus	Men's team
Silver medal – second place	2022 Bangkok	Men's team
Asia Mixed Team Championships
Bronze medal – third place	2019 Hong Kong	Mixed team
Asia Team Championships
Gold medal – first place	2020 Manila	Men's team
SEA Games
Gold medal – first place	2019 Philippines	Men's team
Asian Junior Championships
Bronze medal – third place	2011 Lucknow	Mixed team

Shesar Hiren Rhustavito (born 3 March 1994) is an Indonesian badminton player who is affiliated with Indonesian badminton club PB Djarum. He won four consecutive Indonesia International tournaments, twice at the USM International in Semarang, and two times at the Victor International in Surabaya. Rhustavito was part of the Indonesia winning team at the 2020 Thomas Cup.

== Career ==
=== 2023 ===
Rhustavito started the 2023 season with unsatisfactory results. In the first three tournaments in January, he lost in the first round at the Malaysia, and India Opens, and then in the second round of the Indonesia Masters. This continued on the Europe tour in March, where he also failed in the first round of the All England and Swiss Opens. Rhustavito is scheduled to compete at the SEA Games. However, his participation was cancelled due to left calf injury he suffered during training.

Rhustavito made his comeback after injury by competing in the Australian Open. However, he again not been able to go any further, stopped in the second round to Weng Hongyang in straight games. He then reached the quarter-finals in the China Open, but then had to withdraw from the next tournament in Hong Kong, due to a recurrence of his calf injury. Rhustavito was then made his debut at the Asian Games in Hangzhou, but the team was eliminated in the quarter-finals. Due to his non-participation and the poor results he achieved in several tournaments in 2023, Rhustavito, who was once ranked 17th in the world, had to drop his ranking to 36th in the BWF ranking release on 10 October 2023. In the next tournament he participated in, he was eliminated in the first and two rounds in the Arctic Open in October and Korea Masters in November.

== Awards and nominations ==
Award	Year	Category	Result	Ref.
Gatra Awards	2021	Sports Category with 2020 Thomas Cup squad	Won	

== Achievements ==
=== BWF World Tour (2 titles) ===
The BWF World Tour, which was announced on 19 March 2017 and implemented in 2018, is a series of elite badminton tournaments sanctioned by the Badminton World Federation (BWF). The BWF World Tour is divided into levels of World Tour Finals, Super 1000, Super 750, Super 500, Super 300 (part of the HSBC World Tour), and the BWF Tour Super 100.

Men's singles
Year	Tournament	Level	Opponent	Score	Result	Ref.
2018	Vietnam Open	Super 100	(India) Ajay Jayaram	21–14, 21–10	(gold) Winner	
2019	Russian Open	Super 100	(Singapore) Loh Kean Yew	21–17, 21–19	(gold) Winner	

=== BWF International Challenge/Series (4 titles) ===
Men's singles
Year	Tournament	Opponent	Score	Result	Ref.
2016	Indonesia International	(Thailand) Suppanyu Avihingsanon	21–19, 11–21, 21–17	(gold) Winner	
2017	Indonesia International	(Indonesia) Dionysius Hayom Rumbaka	11–4 retired	(gold) Winner	
2017	Indonesia International	(Thailand) Sitthikom Thammasin	21–8, 21–11	(gold) Winner	
2018	Indonesia International	(Indonesia) Sony Dwi Kuncoro	21–12, 22–20	(gold) Winner	

BWF International Challenge tournament
BWF International Series tournament
BWF Future Series tournament

== Performance timeline ==
Key

W	Won	F	Finalist	SF	Semi-finalist
QF	Quarter-finalist	#R	Rounds 4, 3, 2, 1	RR	Round-robin stage
Q#	Qualification round	A	Absent	w/d	Withdrew
G	Gold	S	Silver	B	Bronze
NH	Not held	N/A	Not applicable	DNQ	Did not qualify

=== National team ===
- Junior level

Team events	2010	2011	2012
Asian Junior Championships	A	B	QF
World Junior Championships	4th	7th	A

- Senior level

Team events	2019	2020	2021	2022	Ref
SEA Games	G	NH	A	NH	
Asia Team Championships	NH	G	NH	A	
Asia Mixed Team Championships	B	NH			
Asian Games	NH			QF	
Thomas Cup	NH	G	NH	S	
Sudirman Cup	DNP	NH	DNP	NH	

=== Individual competitions ===
- Junior level

Events	2010	2011	2012
Asian Junior Championships	3R	3R	4R
World Junior Championships	2R	QF	A

- Senior level

Events	2013	2014	2015	2016	2017	2018	2019	2020	2021	2022
SEA Games	NH		A	NH	A	NH	QF	NH	A	NH
Asian Championships	3R	A					2R	NH		2R
World Championships	DNQ			NH	DNQ			NH	w/d	w/d

Tournament	BWF Superseries / Grand Prix								BWF World Tour							Best	Ref
Tournament	2010	2011	2012	2013	2014	2015	2016	2017	2018	2019	2020	2021	2022	2023	2024	Best	Ref
Malaysia Open	A										NH		QF	1R	A	QF ('22)	
India Open	A										NH		A	1R	A	1R ('23)	
Indonesia Masters	A	3R	A			1R	1R	NH	1R	2R	2R	2R	1R	2R	Q1	3R ('11)	
Thailand Masters	NH						A		1R	A	QF	NH		A		QF ('20)	
German Open	A										NH		1R	A		1R ('22)	
French Open	A									QF	NH	QF	2R	A		QF ('19, '21)	
All England Open	A										2R	A	1R	1R	A	2R ('20)	
Swiss Open	A										NH	QF	1R	1R	A	QF ('21)	
Ruichang China Masters	NH				N/A				A	2R	NH			A	SF	SF ('24)	
Spain Masters	NH								A			SF	NH	A		SF ('21)	
Thailand Open	NH	A	2R	1R	NH	2R	2R	A	Q2	QF	2R	NH	QF	A		QF ('19, '22)	
Thailand Open	NH	A	2R	1R	NH	2R	2R	A	Q2	QF	2R	NH	QF	A		QF ('19, '22)	
Malaysia Masters	A		2R	A				3R	Q2	A	1R	NH	A		1R	3R ('17)	
Singapore Open	A								Q2	Q2	NH		A			Q2 ('18, '19)	
Indonesia Open	A		Q2	A			Q2	Q1	A		NH	2R	1R	A		2R ('21)	
Australian Open	A	1R	A							1R	NH		1R	2R	A	2R ('23)	
Kaohsiung Masters	NH													A	3R	3R ('24)	
Canada Open	A					3R	A				NH		A			3R ('15)	
Korea Open	A									QF	NH		QF	A		QF ('19, '22)	
Indonesia Masters Super 100	NH								SF	A	NH		A	A	3R	SF ('18)	
Indonesia Masters Super 100	NH								SF	A	NH		A	A	3R	SF ('18)	
Chinese Taipei Open	A	2R	A			2R	A		A	SF	NH		A			SF ('19)	
Vietnam Open	A	1R	2R	A		3R	QF	QF	W	A	NH		A		SF	W ('18)	
Hong Kong Open	A									1R	NH			A		1R ('19)	
China Open	A									2R	NH			QF	A	QF ('23)	
Macau Open	A							1R	1R	A	NH				A	1R ('17, '18)	
Arctic Open	N/A	NH	N/A								NH			1R	A	1R ('23)	
Denmark Open	A									2R	A	1R	1R	A		2R ('19)	
Hylo Open	A												2R	A		2R ('22)	
Malaysia Super 100	NA													A	3R	3R ('24)	
Korea Masters	A								QF	A	NH		A	2R	A	QF ('18)	
Japan Masters	NH													Q1	A	Q1 ('23)	
China Masters	A									1R	NH			A		1R ('19)	
Syed Modi International	1R	1R	A	NH	A				2R	A	NH		A	1R	A	2R ('18)	
Chinese Taipei Masters	NH					A	QF	NH								QF ('15)	
Hyderabad Open	NH								A	3R	NH					3R ('19)	
New Zealand Open	NH	N/A	NH	A		3R	A	1R	A	1R	NH					3R ('15)	
Russian Open	A									W	NH					W ('19)	
Year-end ranking	270	128	229	285	—	144	132	94	53	20	18	23	27	50	79	17	
Tournament	2010	2011	2012	2013	2014	2015	2016	2017	2018	2019	2020	2021	2022	2023	2024	Best	Ref

== Record against selected opponents ==
Record against year-end Finals finalists, World Championships semi-finalists, and Olympic quarter-finalists. Accurate as of 25 May 2021.

Player	Matches	Win	Lost	Diff.
(China) Chen Long	2	0	2	–2
(China) Lin Dan	1	1	0	+1
(China) Shi Yuqi	1	0	1	–1
(Chinese Taipei) Chou Tien-chen	4	0	4	–4
(Denmark) Anders Antonsen	1	1	1	0
(Denmark) Viktor Axelsen	2	0	2	–2
(Denmark) Hans-Kristian Vittinghus	2	0	2	–2
(India) Parupalli Kashyap	1	1	0	+1
(India) Srikanth Kidambi	4	4	0	+4

Player	Matches	Win	Lost	Diff.
(India) B. Sai Praneeth	1	0	1	–1
(Indonesia) Sony Dwi Kuncoro	4	2	2	0
(Indonesia) Tommy Sugiarto	2	0	2	–2
(Indonesia) Jonatan Christie	4	1	3	–2
(Japan) Kento Momota	1	0	1	–1
(Malaysia) Liew Daren	2	0	2	–2
(Malaysia) Lee Zii Jia	5	3	4	-1
(Thailand) Kantaphon Wangcharoen	1	0	1	–1
(Vietnam) Nguyễn Tiến Minh	4	1	3	–2
