= Akane Watanabe =

Japanese badminton player (born 1994)

Personal information
- Born: 27 May 1994 (age 32) Saitama Prefecture, Japan

Sport
- Country: Japan
- Sport: Badminton
- Handedness: Right
- Retired: 31 March 2020

Women's singles & doubles
- Highest ranking: 276 (WS 7 April 2016); 25 (WD 19 February 2019); 177 (XD 1 November 2018)
- BWF profile
Medal record
Women's badminton
Representing Japan
World Junior Championships
| Silver medal – second place | 2012 Chiba | Mixed team |
Asian Junior Championships
| Gold medal – first place | 2012 Gimcheon | Mixed team |

Akane Watanabe (渡邉 あかね, Watanabe Akane; born 27 May 1994) is a Japanese badminton player.

== Achievements ==
=== BWF World Tour (1 title, 1 runner-up) ===
The BWF World Tour, which was announced on 19 March 2017 and implemented in 2018, is a series of elite badminton tournaments sanctioned by the Badminton World Federation (BWF). The BWF World Tour is divided into levels of World Tour Finals, Super 1000, Super 750, Super 500, Super 300 (part of the HSBC World Tour), and the BWF Tour Super 100.

Women's doubles
| Year | Tournament | Level | Partner | Opponent | Score | Result | Ref. |
|---|---|---|---|---|---|---|---|
| 2018 | Vietnam Open | Super 100 | (Japan) Misato Aratama | (Japan) Nami Matsuyama (Japan) Chiharu Shida | 21–18, 21–19 | (gold) Winner | |
| 2018 | Macau Open | Super 300 | (Japan) Misato Aratama | (Malaysia) Vivian Hoo (Malaysia) Yap Cheng Wen | 15–21, 20–22 | (silver) Runner-up | |

=== BWF International Challenge/Series ===
Women's doubles
| Year | Tournament | Partner | Opponent | Score | Result | Ref. |
|---|---|---|---|---|---|---|
| 2016 | Finnish Open | (Japan) Misato Aratama | (Netherlands) Samantha Barning (Netherlands) Iris Tabeling | 21–12, 21–17 | (gold) Winner | |
| 2017 | Finnish Open | (Japan) Misato Aratama | (Japan) Chisato Hoshi (Japan) Naru Shinoya | 21–18, 21–13 | (gold) Winner | |
| 2017 | Spanish International | (Japan) Misato Aratama | (Japan) Ayako Sakuramoto (Japan) Yukiko Takahata | 10–21, 15–21 | (silver) Runner-up | |
| 2017 | Malaysia International | (Japan) Misato Aratama | (Thailand) Kittipak Dubthuk (Thailand) Natcha Saengchote | 21–18, 21–15 | (gold) Winner | |
| 2019 | Denmark International | (Japan) Saori Ozaki | (England) Chloe Birch (England) Lauren Smith | 21–13, 21–18 | (gold) Winner | |

BWF International Challenge tournament
