= Badminton at the 2019 SEA Games – Individual event =

Tournament details
- Dates: 5–9 December
- Venue: Muntinlupa Sports Complex
- Location: Muntinlupa, Metro Manila, Philippines

Champions
- Men's singles: (Malaysia) Lee Zii Jia
- Women's singles: (Malaysia) Kisona Selvaduray
- Men's doubles: (Malaysia) Aaron Chia (Malaysia) Soh Wooi Yik
- Women's doubles: (Indonesia) Greysia Polii (Indonesia) Apriyani Rahayu
- Mixed doubles: (Indonesia) Praveen Jordan (Indonesia) Melati Daeva Oktavianti

Individual event for badminton at the 2019 SEA Games was held in Muntinlupa Sports Complex, Metro Manila, Philippines from 5 to 9 December 2019.

== Men's singles ==
=== Seeds ===
1. (Thailand) Kantaphon Wangcharoen (semi-finals)
2. (Malaysia) Lee Zii Jia (gold medalist)
3. (Indonesia) Shesar Hiren Rhustavito (quarter-finals)
4. (Thailand) Sitthikom Thammasin (semi-finals)

=== Draw ===
First round
Aung Myo Htoo (MYA)	21	19
Ros Pedrosa (PHI)	23	21
3	Shesar Hiren Rhustavito (INA)	21	21
Leng Sopheaktra (CAM)	4	11
Soong Joo Ven (MAS)	17	16
Loh Kean Yew (SGP)	21	21
Lanz Ralf Zafra (PHI)	21	11	21
Nguyễn Hải Đăng (VIE)	18	21	18
Firman Abdul Kholik (INA)	9	17
4	Sitthikom Thammasin (THA)	21	21
Phone Pyae Naing (MYA)	21	16	21
Tep Chanmara (CAM)	16	21	18
Joel Koh (SGP)	17	10
2	Lee Zii Jia (MAS)	21	21

Quarter-finals
1	Kantaphon Wangcharoen (THA)	21	21
Ros Pedrosa (PHI)	11	11
3	Shesar Hiren Rhustavito (INA)	18	20
Loh Kean Yew (SGP)	21	22
Lanz Ralf Zafra (PHI)	19	8
4	Sitthikom Thammasin (THA)	21	21
Phone Pyae Naing (MYA)	14	19
2	Lee Zii Jia (MAS)	21	21

Semi-finals
1	Kantaphon Wangcharoen (THA)	21	6	9
Loh Kean Yew (SGP)	16	21	21
4	Sitthikom Thammasin (THA)	12	9
2	Lee Zii Jia (MAS)	21	21

Final
Loh Kean Yew (SGP)	18	18
2	Lee Zii Jia (MAS)	21	21

== Women's singles ==
=== Seeds ===
1. (Thailand) Pornpawee Chochuwong (semi-finals)
2. (Thailand) Nitchaon Jindapol (semi-finals)
3. (Indonesia) Gregoria Mariska Tunjung (quarter-finals)
4. (Singapore) Yeo Jia Min (first round)

=== Draw ===
First round
Bianca Carlos (PHI)	21	14	21
Nguyễn Thùy Linh (VIE)	13	21	12
4	Yeo Jia Min (SGP)	16	24	9^{r}
Ruselli Hartawan (INA)	21	22	19
Soniia Cheah (MAS)	21	15	5^{r}
Thet Htar Thuzar (MYA)	18	21	12
Nicole Albo (PHI)	21	10	15
Kisona Selvaduray (MAS)	18	21	21
Vũ Thị Trang (VIE)	14	21	13
3	Gregoria Mariska Tunjung (INA)	21	10	21
Jaslyn Hooi (SGP)	21	21
Oo Thwe Tar (MYA)	9	4
Ker Pechhoravy (CAM)	5	15
2	Nitchaon Jindapol (THA)	21	21

Quarter-finals
1	Pornpawee Chochuwong (THA)	21	21
Bianca Carlos (PHI)	9	10
Ruselli Hartawan (INA)	21	21
Thet Htar Thuzar (MYA)	11	17
Kisona Selvaduray (MAS)	19	21	21
3	Gregoria Mariska Tunjung (INA)	21	12	19
Jaslyn Hooi (SGP)	16	14
2	Nitchaon Jindapol (THA)	21	21

Semi-finals
1	Pornpawee Chochuwong (THA)	16	21	18
Ruselli Hartawan (INA)	21	10	21
Kisona Selvaduray (MAS)	11	27	21
2	Nitchaon Jindapol (THA)	21	25	14

Final
Ruselli Hartawan (INA)	22	14	13
Kisona Selvaduray (MAS)	20	21	21

== Men's doubles ==
=== Seeds ===
1. (Indonesia) Fajar Alfian / Muhammad Rian Ardianto (quarter-finals)
2. (Malaysia) Aaron Chia / Soh Wooi Yik (gold medalists)
3. (Malaysia) Ong Yew Sin / Teo Ee Yi (semi-finals)
4. (Indonesia) Wahyu Nayaka / Ade Yusuf Santoso (semi-finals)

=== Draw ===
First round
Bodin Isara (THA); Maneepong Jongjit (THA)	21	21
Aung Myo Htoo (MYA); Phone Pyae Naing (MYA)	17	14
3	Ong Yew Sin (MAS); Teo Ee Yi (MAS)	21	21
Cheng Phorrom (CAM); Sieng Kimhong (CAM)	10	10
Danny Bawa Chrisnanta (SGP); Andy Kwek (SGP)	21	19	14
Peter Gabriel Magnaye (PHI); Alvin Morada (PHI)	18	21	21
Kittisak Namdash (THA); Nipitphon Phuangphuapet (THA)	17	21	21
Philip Joper Escueta (PHI); Paul Pantig (PHI)	21	16	7
Đỗ Tuấn Đức (VIE); Phạm Hồng Nam (VIE)	21	14	14
4	Wahyu Nayaka (INA); Ade Yusuf (INA)	14	21	21
Terry Hee (SGP); Loh Kean Hean (SGP)	21	21
Chan Win Oo (MYA); Hein Si Thu Toe (MYA)	9	18
Leng Sopheaktra (CAM); Saom Dyna (CAM)	9	5
2	Aaron Chia (MAS); Soh Wooi Yik (MAS)	21	21

Quarter-finals
1	Fajar Alfian (INA); Muhammad Rian Ardianto (INA)	16	21
Bodin Isara (THA); Maneepong Jongjit (THA)	21	23
3	Ong Yew Sin (MAS); Teo Ee Yi (MAS)	19	21	21
Peter Gabriel Magnaye (PHI); Alvin Morada (PHI)	21	12	11
Kittisak Namdash (THA); Nipitphon Phuangphuapet (THA)	16	18
4	Wahyu Nayaka (INA); Ade Yusuf (INA)	21	21
Terry Hee (SGP); Loh Kean Hean (SGP)	19	19
2	Aaron Chia (MAS); Soh Wooi Yik (MAS)	21	21

Semi-finals
Bodin Isara (THA); Maneepong Jongjit (THA)	21	16	21
3	Ong Yew Sin (MAS); Teo Ee Yi (MAS)	12	21	19
4	Wahyu Nayaka (INA); Ade Yusuf (INA)	12	21	19
2	Aaron Chia (MAS); Soh Wooi Yik (MAS)	21	18	21

Final
Bodin Isara (THA); Maneepong Jongjit (THA)	21	15	16
2	Aaron Chia (MAS); Soh Wooi Yik (MAS)	18	21	21

== Women's doubles ==
=== Seeds ===
1. (Indonesia) Greysia Polii / Apriyani Rahayu (gold medalists)
2. (Malaysia) Chow Mei Kuan / Lee Meng Yean (semi-finals)
3. (Malaysia) Vivian Hoo / Yap Cheng Wen (semi-finals)
4. (Thailand) Chayanit Chaladchalam / Phataimas Muenwong (silver medalists)

=== Draw ===
First round
Savitree Amitrapai (THA); Puttita Supajirakul (THA)	21	21
Đinh Thị Phương Hồng (VIE); Phạm Thị Khánh (VIE)	12	17
Shinta Mulia Sari (SGP); Crystal Wong (SGP)	17	21	21
Geva De Vera (PHI); Chanelle Lunod (PHI)	21	17	8
Grace Chua (SGP); Nur Insyirah Khan (SGP)	15	12
Alyssa Leonardo (PHI); Thea Pomar (PHI)	21	21
Phạm Như Thảo (VIE); Trần Thị Phương Thúy (VIE)	7	17
Siti Fadia Silva Ramadhanti (INA); Ribka Sugiarto (INA)	21	21

Quarter-finals
1	Greysia Polii (INA); Apriyani Rahayu (INA)	21	21
Savitree Amitrapai (THA); Puttita Supajirakul (THA)	7	11
3	Vivian Hoo (MAS); Yap Cheng Wen (MAS)	15	21	21
Shinta Mulia Sari (SGP); Crystal Wong (SGP)	21	10	18
Alyssa Leonardo (PHI); Thea Pomar (PHI)	15	13
4	Chayanit Chaladchalam (THA); Phataimas Muenwong (THA)	21	21
Siti Fadia Silva Ramadhanti (INA); Ribka Sugiarto (INA)	19	16
2	Chow Mei Kuan (MAS); Lee Meng Yean (MAS)	21	21

Semi-finals
1	Greysia Polii (INA); Apriyani Rahayu (INA)	21	21
3	Vivian Hoo (MAS); Yap Cheng Wen (MAS)	18	19
4	Chayanit Chaladchalam (THA); Phataimas Muenwong (THA)	22	21
2	Chow Mei Kuan (MAS); Lee Meng Yean (MAS)	20	11

Final
1	Greysia Polii (INA); Apriyani Rahayu (INA)	21	21
4	Chayanit Chaladchalam (THA); Phataimas Muenwong (THA)	3	18

== Mixed doubles ==
=== Seeds ===
1. (Indonesia) Praveen Jordan / Melati Daeva Oktavianti (gold medalists)
2. (Malaysia) Goh Soon Huat / Shevon Jemie Lai (silver medalists)
3. (Malaysia) Tan Kian Meng / Lai Pei Jing (semi-finals)
4. (Thailand) Nipitphon Phuangphuapet / Savitree Amitrapai (quarter-finals)

=== Draw ===
First round
Nguyễn Văn Việt (VIE); Đinh Thị Phương Hồng (VIE)	22	14	12
Alvin Morada (PHI); Alyssa Leonardo (PHI)	20	21	21
3	Tan Kian Meng (MAS); Lai Pei Jing (MAS)	21	24
Terry Hee (SGP); Crystal Wong (SGP)	12	22
Kittinupong Kedren (THA); Puttita Supajirakul (THA)	21	21
Hein Si Thu Toe (MYA); Oo Thwe Tar (MYA)	6	13
Peter Gabriel Magnaye (PHI); Thea Pomar (PHI)	18	12
Rinov Rivaldy (INA); Pitha Haningtyas Mentari (INA)	21	21
Tep Chanmara (CAM); Ker Pecchoravy (CAM)	6	9
4	Nipitphon Phuangphuapet (THA); Savitree Amitrapai (THA)	21	21
Đỗ Tuấn Đức (VIE); Phạm Như Thảo (VIE)	22	21
Danny Bawa Chrisnanta (SGP); Jin Yujia (SGP)	20	12

Quarter-finals
1	Praveen Jordan (INA); Melati Daeva Oktavianti (INA)	21	21
Alvin Morada (PHI); Alyssa Leonardo (PHI)	13	13
3	Tan Kian Meng (MAS); Lai Pei Jing (MAS)	18	21	21
Kittinupong Kedren (THA); Puttita Supajirakul (THA)	21	5	16
Rinov Rivaldy (INA); Pitha Haningtyas Mentari (INA)	21	21	21
4	Nipitphon Phuangphuapet (THA); Savitree Amitrapai (THA)	23	13	14
Đỗ Tuấn Đức (VIE); Phạm Như Thảo (VIE)	13	21	16
2	Goh Soon Huat (MAS); Shevon Jemie Lai (MAS)	21	14	21

Semi-finals
1	Praveen Jordan (INA); Melati Daeva Oktavianti (INA)	21	21
3	Tan Kian Meng (MAS); Lai Pei Jing (MAS)	16	18
Rinov Rivaldy (INA); Pitha Haningtyas Mentari (INA)	21	11	22
2	Goh Soon Huat (MAS); Shevon Jemie Lai (MAS)	18	21	24

Final
1	Praveen Jordan (INA); Melati Daeva Oktavianti (INA)	21	19	23
2	Goh Soon Huat (MAS); Shevon Jemie Lai (MAS)	19	21	21

== See also ==
- Men's team tournament
- Women's team tournament
