= Yap Cheng Wen =

Malaysian badminton player (born 1995)

Yap Cheng Wen 叶铮雯
Personal information
- Born: 4 January 1995 (age 31) Melaka, Malaysia
- Height: 1.54 m (5 ft 1 in)

Sport
- Country: Malaysia
- Sport: Badminton
- Handedness: Left

Women's & Mixed doubles
- Highest ranking: 17 (WD with Vivian Hoo) (6 August 2019); 133 (XD with Loo Bing Kun) (30 May 2023)
- Current ranking: 318 (WD with Cheng Su Hui); 133 (XD with Loo Bing Kun) (30 May 2023)
- BWF profile
Medal record
Women's badminton
Representing Malaysia
Asia Team Championships
Bronze medal – third place	2020 Manila	Women's team
SEA Games
Bronze medal – third place	2019 Philippines	Women's doubles
Bronze medal – third place	2019 Philippines	Women's team

Yap Cheng Wen

Chinese name
- Traditional Chinese: 葉錚雯
- Simplified Chinese: 叶铮雯
- Hanyu Pinyin: Yè Zhēng Wén
- Wade–Giles: Yeh4 Chêng Wên2
- Pha̍k-fa-sṳ: Ia̍p Tshâng-vùn
- Jyutping: Jip6 Zang1 Man4
- Hokkien POJ: Ia̍p Cheng-bûn

Yap Cheng Wen (叶铮雯; born 4 January 1995) is a Malaysian badminton player. In 2016, she won the Scottish Open tournament in the women's doubles event partnered with Lim Yin Loo.

== Achievements ==
=== SEA Games ===
Women's doubles
Year	Venue	Partner	Opponent	Score	Result
2019	Muntinlupa Sports Complex; Metro Manila, Philippines	(Malaysia) Vivian Hoo	(Indonesia) Greysia Polii (Indonesia) Apriyani Rahayu	18–21, 19–21	Bronze

=== BWF World Tour (1 title, 1 runner-up) ===
The BWF World Tour, which was announced on 19 March 2017 and implemented in 2018, is a series of elite badminton tournaments sanctioned by the Badminton World Federation (BWF). The BWF World Tour is divided into levels of World Tour Finals, Super 1000, Super 750, Super 500, Super 300 (part of the HSBC World Tour), and the BWF Tour Super 100.

Women's doubles
Year	Tournament	Level	Partner	Opponent	Score	Result
2018	Hyderabad Open	Super 100	(Malaysia) Vivian Hoo	(Hong Kong) Ng Tsz Yau (Hong Kong) Yuen Sin Ying	18–21, 21–16, 14–21	(silver) Runner-up
2018	Macau Open	Super 300	(Malaysia) Vivian Hoo	(Japan) Misato Aratama (Japan) Akane Watanabe	21–15, 22–20	(gold) Winner

=== BWF Grand Prix (1 title) ===
The BWF Grand Prix had two levels, the Grand Prix and Grand Prix Gold. It was a series of badminton tournaments sanctioned by the Badminton World Federation (BWF) and played between 2007 and 2017.

Women's doubles
Year	Tournament	Partner	Opponent	Score	Result
2016	Scottish Open	(Malaysia) Lim Yin Loo	(Malaysia) Amelia Alicia Anscelly (Malaysia) Teoh Mei Xing	21–17, 21–13	(gold) Winner

BWF Grand Prix Gold tournament
BWF Grand Prix tournament

=== BWF International Challenge/Series (2 titles, 5 runners-up) ===
Women's doubles
Year	Tournament	Partner	Opponent	Score	Result
2015	Iran Fajr International	(Malaysia) Joyce Choong	(Turkey) Özge Bayrak (Turkey) Neslihan Yiğit	19–21, 18–21	(silver) Runner-up
2015	Belgian International	(Malaysia) Joyce Choong	(Denmark) Maiken Fruergaard (Denmark) Sara Thygesen	18–21, 11–21	(silver) Runner-up
2016	Vietnam International Series	(Malaysia) Lim Yin Loo	(Vietnam) Nguyễn Thị Sen (Vietnam) Vũ Thị Trang	18–21, 22–24	(silver) Runner-up
2016	Indonesia International	(Malaysia) Lim Yin Loo	(Indonesia) Nisak Puji Lestari (Indonesia) Merisa Cindy Sahputri	14–21, 15–10 retired	(gold) Winner
2018	Finnish Open	(Malaysia) Goh Yea Ching	(Japan) Asumi Kugo (Japan) Megumi Yokoyama	24–22, 15–21, 13–21	(silver) Runner-up
2018	Bangladesh International	(Malaysia) Vivian Hoo	(India) Aparna Balan (India) Sruthi K.P	21–14, 21–13	(gold) Winner
2021	Austrian Open	(Malaysia) Anna Cheong	(Indonesia) Ni Ketut Mahadewi Istarani (Indonesia) Serena Kani	11–21, 16–21	(silver) Runner-up

BWF International Challenge tournament
BWF International Series tournament
