= Zhou Zeqi (badminton) =

Chinese badminton player (born 1997)

Zhou Zeqi 周泽奇
Personal information
- Born: 18 September 1997 (age 28) Hunan, China

Sport
- Country: China
- Sport: Badminton

Men's singles
- Highest ranking: 40 (16 April 2019)
- Current ranking: 96 (7 January 2020)
- BWF profile

Zhou Zeqi (Chinese: 周泽奇; pinyin: Zhōu Zéqí; born 18 September 1997) is a Chinese badminton player.

== Achievements ==
=== BWF World Tour ===
The BWF World Tour, announced on 19 March 2017 and implemented in 2018, is a series of elite badminton tournaments, sanctioned by Badminton World Federation (BWF). The BWF World Tour are divided into six levels, namely World Tour Finals, Super 1000, Super 750, Super 500, Super 300 (part of the HSBC World Tour), and the BWF Tour Super 100.

Men's singles

Year	Tournament	Level	Opponent	Score	Result
2018	Macau Open	Super 300	(South Korea) Lee Hyun-il	9–21, 19–21	(silver) Runner-up
2018	Australian Open	Super 300	(China) Lu Guangzu	8–21, 21–23	(silver) Runner-up
