= Vivian Hoo =

Malaysian former badminton player

Vivian Hoo 许家雯
Personal information
- Born: Vivian Hoo Kah Mun; 19 March 1990 (age 36) Kuala Lumpur, Malaysia
- Height: 1.65 m (5 ft 5 in)
- Weight: 60 kg (132 lb)

Sport
- Country: Malaysia
- Sport: Badminton
- Handedness: Right
- Coached by: Chan Chong Ming
- Retired: 9 January 2025

Women's doubles
- Highest ranking: 9 (with Woon Khe Wei 19 November 2015)
- BWF profile
Medal record
Women's badminton
Representing Malaysia
Sudirman Cup
Bronze medal – third place	2009 Guangzhou	Mixed team
Commonwealth Games
Gold medal – first place	2014 Glasgow	Mixed team
Gold medal – first place	2014 Glasgow	Women's doubles
Gold medal – first place	2018 Gold Coast	Women's doubles
Silver medal – second place	2018 Gold Coast	Mixed team
Asian Games
Bronze medal – third place	2014 Incheon	Women's doubles
Asian Championships
Silver medal – second place	2010 New Delhi	Women's doubles
Asia Team Championships
Bronze medal – third place	2020 Manila	Women's team
SEA Games
Gold medal – first place	2013 Naypyidaw	Women's doubles
Silver medal – second place	2015 Singapore	Women's doubles
Silver medal – second place	2015 Singapore	Women's team
Silver medal – second place	2017 Kuala Lumpur	Women's team
Bronze medal – third place	2011 Jakarta–Palembang	Women's team
Bronze medal – third place	2017 Kuala Lumpur	Women's doubles
Bronze medal – third place	2019 Philippines	Women's doubles
Bronze medal – third place	2019 Philippines	Women's team
World Junior Championships
Bronze medal – third place	2008 Pune	Mixed doubles
Bronze medal – third place	2008 Pune	Mixed team
Asian Junior Championships
Gold medal – first place	2007 Kuala Lumpur	Mixed team
Bronze medal – third place	2008 Kuala Lumpur	Mixed team

Vivian Hoo

Chinese name
- Traditional Chinese: 許家雯
- Simplified Chinese: 许家雯
Transcriptions
Standard Mandarin
- Hanyu Pinyin: Xǔ Jiāwén
Hakka
- Pha̍k-fa-sṳ: Hí Kâ-vùn
Yue: Cantonese
- Jyutping: Heoi2 Gaa1 Man4
Southern Min
- Hokkien POJ: Khó͘ Ka-bûn
- Tâi-lô: Khóo Ka-bûn

Vivian Hoo Kah Mun (Chinese: 许家雯; pinyin: Xǔ Jiāwén; Jyutping: Heoi2 Gaa1 Man4; Pe̍h-ōe-jī: Khó͘ Ka-bûn; Pha̍k-fa-sṳ: Hí Kâ-vùn; born 19 March 1990) is a Malaysian former badminton player. She is the elder sister of Hoo Pang Ron, who is also a Malaysian badminton player.

== Career ==
Teamed-up with Woon Khe Wei in the women's doubles event, they reached top 10 BWF World Ranking. Being a regular women's doubles player, Hoo has won the Commonwealth Games women's doubles event twice, first with her regular partner, Woon, at the 2014 Commonwealth Games in Glasgow and a second time with Chow Mei Kuan at the 2018 Commonwealth Games in Gold Coast. Hoo and Woon had also reached the quarter-finals of the 2016 Rio Olympics.

== Personal life ==
Vivian is the older sister of Hoo Pang Ron, who is also a badminton player. She is an alumna of University of Malaya.

== Achievements ==
=== Commonwealth Games ===
Women's doubles
Year	Venue	Partner	Opponent	Score	Result
2014	Emirates Arena; Glasgow, Scotland	(Malaysia) Woon Khe Wei	(India) Jwala Gutta (India) Ashwini Ponnappa	21–17, 23–21	Gold
2018	Carrara Sports and Leisure Centre; Gold Coast, Australia	(Malaysia) Chow Mei Kuan	(England) Lauren Smith (England) Sarah Walker	21–12, 21–12	Gold

=== Asian Games ===
Women's doubles
Year	Venue	Partner	Opponent	Score	Result
2014	Gyeyang Gymnasium; Incheon, South Korea	(Malaysia) Woon Khe Wei	(Japan) Misaki Matsutomo (Japan) Ayaka Takahashi	16–21, 17–21	Bronze

=== Asian Championships ===
Women's doubles
Year	Venue	Partner	Opponent	Score	Result
2010	Siri Fort Indoor Stadium; New Delhi, India	(Malaysia) Woon Khe Wei	(China) Pan Pan (China) Tian Qing	10–21, 6–21	Silver

=== SEA Games ===
Women's doubles
Year	Venue	Partner	Opponent	Score	Result
2013	Wunna Theikdi Indoor Stadium; Naypyidaw, Myanmar	(Malaysia) Woon Khe Wei	(Indonesia) Nitya Krishinda Maheswari (Indonesia) Greysia Polii	21–17, 18–21, 21–17	Gold
2015	Singapore Indoor Stadium; Singapore	(Malaysia) Woon Khe Wei	(Malaysia) Amelia Alicia Anscelly (Malaysia) Soong Fie Cho	18–21, 13–21	Silver
2017	Axiata Arena; Kuala Lumpur, Malaysia	(Malaysia) Woon Khe Wei	(Thailand) Jongkolphan Kititharakul (Thailand) Rawinda Prajongjai	21–17, 20–22, 17–21	Bronze
2019	Muntinlupa Sports Complex; Metro Manila, Philippines	(Malaysia) Yap Cheng Wen	(Indonesia) Greysia Polii (Indonesia) Apriyani Rahayu	18–21, 19–21	Bronze

=== BWF World Junior Championships ===
Mixed' doubles
Year	Venue	Partner	Opponent	Score	Result
2008	Shree Shiv Chhatrapati Badminton Hall; Pune, India	(Malaysia) Mak Hee Chun	(China) Zhang Nan (China) Lu Lu	12–21, 7–21	Bronze

=== BWF World Tour (1 title, 1 runner-up) ===
The BWF World Tour, which was announced on 19 March 2017 and implemented in 2018, is a series of elite badminton tournaments sanctioned by the Badminton World Federation (BWF). The BWF World Tour is divided into levels of World Tour Finals, Super 1000, Super 750, Super 500, Super 300 (part of the HSBC World Tour), and the BWF Tour Super 100.

Women's doubles
Year	Tournament	Level	Partner	Opponent	Score	Result
2018	Hyderabad Open	Super 100	(Malaysia) Yap Cheng Wen	(Hong Kong) Ng Tsz Yau (Hong Kong) Yuen Sin Ying	18–21, 21–16, 14–21	(silver) Runner-up
2018	Macau Open	Super 300	(Malaysia) Yap Cheng Wen	(Japan) Misato Aratama (Japan) Akane Watanabe	21–15, 22–20	(gold) Winner

=== BWF Grand Prix (2 titles, 2 runners-up) ===
The BWF Grand Prix had two levels, the Grand Prix and Grand Prix Gold. It was a series of badminton tournaments sanctioned by the Badminton World Federation (BWF) and played between 2007 and 2017.

Women's doubles
Year	Tournament	Partner	Opponent	Score	Result
2011	Indonesia Grand Prix Gold	(Malaysia) Woon Khe Wei	(China) Bao Yixin (China) Zhong Qianxin	19–21, 21–19, 21–18	(gold) Winner
2013	New Zealand Open	(Malaysia) Woon Khe Wei	(China) Ou Dongni (China) Tang Yuanting	15–21, 21–11, 19–21	(silver) Runner-up
2015	Syed Modi International	(Malaysia) Woon Khe Wei	(Malaysia) Amelia Alicia Anscelly (Malaysia) Soong Fie Cho	20–22, 15–21	(silver) Runner-up
2017	New Zealand Open	(Malaysia) Woon Khe Wei	(Japan) Ayako Sakuramoto (Japan) Yukiko Takahata	18–21, 21–16, 21–19	(gold) Winner

BWF Grand Prix Gold tournament
BWF Grand Prix tournament

=== BWF International Challenge/Series (1 title, 2 runners-up) ===
Women's doubles
Year	Tournament	Partner	Opponent	Score	Result
2009	Iran Fajr International	(Malaysia) Sannatasah Saniru	(Turkey) Ezgi Epice (Turkey) Aprilsasi Putri Lejarsar Variella	21–9, 11–21, 9–21	(silver) Runner-up
2018	Vietnam International	(Malaysia) Chow Mei Kuan	(South Korea) Baek Ha-na (South Korea) Lee Yu-rim	19–21, 21–17, 17–21	(silver) Runner-up
2018	Bangladesh International	(Malaysia) Yap Cheng Wen	(India) Aparna Balan (India) Sruthi K. P.	21–14, 21–13	(gold) Winner

BWF International Challenge tournament
BWF International Series tournament
