= 2016 Malaysia Masters Grand Prix Gold =

Tournament details
- Dates: 19 – 24 January 2016
- Level: Grand Prix Gold
- Total prize money: US$120,000
- Venue: SPICE Arena
- Location: Penang, Malaysia

Champions
- Men's singles: (Malaysia) Lee Chong Wei
- Women's singles: (India) P. V. Sindhu
- Men's doubles: (Indonesia) Marcus Fernaldi Gideon (Indonesia) Kevin Sanjaya Sukamuljo
- Women's doubles: (Japan) Misaki Matsutomo (Japan) Ayaka Takahashi
- Mixed doubles: (China) Zheng Siwei (China) Li Yinhui

The 2016 Malaysia Masters Grand Prix Gold was the first grand prix's badminton tournament of the 2016 BWF Grand Prix and Grand Prix Gold. The tournament was held at SPICE Arena in Penang, Malaysia from 19–24 January 2016 and had a total purse of $120,000.

== Men's singles ==
=== Seeds ===
1. (Malaysia) Lee Chong Wei (champion)
2. (India) Srikanth Kidambi (semifinals)
3. (Indonesia) Tommy Sugiarto (semifinals)
4. (South Korea) Son Wan-ho (first round)
5. (Hong Kong) Hu Yun (second round)
6. (India) Parupalli Kashyap (withdrawn)
7. (Hong Kong) Wei Nan (third round)
8. (Hong Kong) Ng Ka Long (quarterfinals)
9. (India) H. S. Prannoy (withdrawn)
10. (India) Ajay Jayaram (quarterfinals)
11. (South Korea) Lee Dong-keun (third round)
12. (Japan) Sho Sasaki (first round)
13. (Chinese Taipei) Hsu Jen-hao (second round)
14. (South Korea) Jeon Hyeok-jin (second round)
15. (Hong Kong) Wong Wing Ki (first round)
16. (Thailand) Boonsak Ponsana (third round)

=== Finals ===
Quarterfinals
1	(Malaysia) Lee Chong Wei	21	21
10	(India) Ajay Jayaram	16	16
3	(Indonesia) Tommy Sugiarto	21	21
(China) Qiao Bin	6	17
8	(Hong Kong) Ng Ka Long	11	15
(Malaysia) Iskandar Zulkarnain Zainuddin	21	21
(China) Huang Yuxiang	15	14
2	(India) Srikanth Kidambi	21	21

Semifinals
1	(Malaysia) Lee Chong Wei	21	21
3	(Indonesia) Tommy Sugiarto	19	15
(Malaysia) Iskandar Zulkarnain Zainuddin	27	21
2	(India) Srikanth Kidambi	25	9

Final
1	(Malaysia) Lee Chong Wei	21	21
(Malaysia) Iskandar Zulkarnain Zainuddin	18	11

=== Top half ===
==== Section 1 ====
First Round
1	(Malaysia) Lee C W	21	21
PFQ	(Indonesia) F I Hadmadi	14	15
(Egypt) A A El Khateeb	10	11
(Thailand) K Leelavechabutr	21	21
13	(Chinese Taipei) Hsu J-h	21	21
Q7	(Malaysia) Yeoh S Z	14	15
(Indonesia) W Y Prasetyo	21	16	19
(Singapore) D Wong	13	21	21

Second Round
1	(Malaysia) Lee C W	21	21
(Thailand) K Leelavechabutr	6	15
13	(Chinese Taipei) Hsu J-h	15	17
(Singapore) D Wong	21	21

Third Round
1	(Malaysia) Lee C W	21	21
(Singapore) D Wong	10	10

==== Section 2 ====
First Round
5	(Hong Kong) Hu Y	21	21
PFQ	(Malaysia) Ai W J	13	7
(China) Zhu SY	22	14
(Malaysia) Z Zulkiffli	24	21
10	(India) A Jayaram	21	21
(Japan) T Ueda	19	11
(Czech Republic) P Koukal	21	21
(Belgium) Y Tan	13	18

Second Round
5	(Hong Kong) Hu Y	21	18	22
(Malaysia) Z Zulkiffli	17	21	24
10	(India) A Jayaram	21	21
(Czech Republic) P Koukal	17	17

Third Round
(Malaysia) Z Zulkiffli	21	8	20
10	(India) A Jayaram	11	21	22

==== Section 3 ====
First Round
3	(Indonesia) T Sugiarto	21	21
Q6	(Indonesia) S P Wibowo	18	11
Q1	(Malaysia) S S Misfahul Muneer	13	15
(India) B S Praneeth	21	21
11	(South Korea) Lee D-k	21	15	21
(Thailand) T Saensomboonsuk	18	21	18
(Malaysia) Tan C S	19	21	17
(Ukraine) A Pochtarev	21	8	21

Second Round
3	(Indonesia) T Sugiarto	21	10	21
(India) B S Praneeth	14	21	18
11	(South Korea) Lee D-k	21	21
(Ukraine) A Pochtarev	12	9

Third Round
3	(Indonesia) T Sugiarto	21	21
11	(South Korea) Lee D-k	2	17

==== Section 4 ====
First Round
PFQ	(Indonesia) N E Sulistyo	13	15
(Malaysia) Soo T Z	21	21
(Chinese Taipei) Lin Y-h	21	14	21
(Japan) R Takeshita	17	21	23
15	(Hong Kong) Wong W K	17	19
(Indonesia) S Santoso	21	21
(China) Qiao B	21	21
(Malaysia) M A Abdul Latif	12	19

Second Round
(Malaysia) Soo T Z	21	24
(Japan) R Takeshita	14	22
(Indonesia) S Santoso	18	13
(China) Qiao B	21	21

Third Round
(Malaysia) Soo T Z	13	10
(China) Qiao B	21	21

=== Bottom half ===
==== Section 5 ====
First Round
(Vietnam) Nguyễn T M	8	16
(Malaysia) Goh S H	21	21
(India) S Verma	21	21
12	(Japan) S Sasaki	18	18
(Indonesia) S D Kuncoro	21	21
(Chinese Taipei) Wang T-w	14	15
(Malaysia) Z Zulkiffli	0^{r}
8	(Hong Kong) Ng K L	4

Second Round
(Malaysia) Goh S H	7	21	21
(India) S Verma	21	13	16
(Indonesia) S D Kuncoro	16	16
8	(Hong Kong) Ng K L	21	21

Third Round
(Malaysia) Goh S H	17	13
8	(Hong Kong) Ng K L	21	21

==== Section 6 ====
First Round
(Malaysia) Soong J V	17	24	14
(China) Xue S	21	22	21
(Thailand) K Wangcharoen	19	16
PFQ	(India) S Dey	21	21
Q2	(Malaysia) Chong Y H	21	16	21
(Indonesia) A S Ginting	19	21	23
(Malaysia) I Z Zainuddin	21	21
4	(South Korea) Son W-h	5	14

Second Round
(China) Xue S	16	21	21
PFQ	(India) S Dey	21	11	19
(Indonesia) A S Ginting	18	13
(Malaysia) I Z Zainuddin	21	21

Third Round
(China) Xue S	17	21	12
(Malaysia) I Z Zainuddin	21	18	21

==== Section 7 ====
First Round
Q5	(Chinese Taipei) Chen C-w	10	12
(China) Huang YX	21	21
(Japan) K Nishimoto	15	22
14	(South Korea) Jeon H-j	21	24
Q4	(Malaysia) Goh G C	21	22
(Malaysia) Lim C W	19	20
(Indonesia) I M Mustofa	18	15
7	(Hong Kong) Wei N	21	21

Second Round
(China) Huang YX	21	21
14	(South Korea) Jeon H-j	17	16
Q4	(Malaysia) Goh G C	18	21	19
7	(Hong Kong) Wei N	21	13	21

Third Round
(China) Huang YX	21	13	21
7	(Hong Kong) Wei N	18	21	16

==== Section 8 ====
First Round
Q3	(Hong Kong) Lee C Y	21	21
Q8	(Malaysia) E S Misfahul Muneer	13	15
(Malaysia) Liew D	10	15
16	(Thailand) B Ponsana	21	21
(China) Shi YQ	17	12
(Indonesia) J Christie	21	21
(Malaysia) Chong W F	17	11
2	(India) S Kidambi	21	21

Second Round
Q3	(Hong Kong) Lee C Y	17	9
16	(Thailand) B Ponsana	21	21
(Indonesia) J Christie	16	15
2	(India) S Kidambi	21	21

Third Round
16	(Thailand) B Ponsana	17	10
2	(India) S Kidambi	21	21

== Women's singles ==
=== Seeds ===
1. (South Korea) Sung Ji-hyun (semifinals)
2. (Japan) Akane Yamaguchi (first round)
3. (India) P. V. Sindhu (champion)
4. (South Korea) Bae Yeon-ju (quarterfinals)
5. (Japan) Sayaka Sato (quarterfinals)
6. (Japan) Minatsu Mitani (first round)
7. (Japan) Yui Hashimoto (semifinals)
8. (Thailand) Busanan Ongbumrungpan (quarterfinals)

=== Finals ===
Semifinals
1	(South Korea) Sung Ji-hyun	19	21	10
3	(India) P. V. Sindhu	21	12	21
7	(Japan) Yui Hashimoto	21	18	8
(Scotland) Kirsty Gilmour	12	21	21

Final
3	(India) P. V. Sindhu	21	21
(Scotland) Kirsty Gilmour	15	9

=== Top half ===
==== Section 1 ====
First Round
1	(South Korea) Sung J-h	21	21
(Hong Kong) Cheung N Y	11	17
(Indonesia) H Ramadini	21	21
(Chinese Taipei) Pai Y-p	14	15
5	(Japan) S Sato	21	21
(Malaysia) Tee J Y	19	17
(Thailand) S Katethong	21	21	21
Q1	(Malaysia) Lim C S	18	23	18

Second Round
1	(South Korea) Sung J-h	21	21
(Indonesia) H Ramadini	17	7
5	(Japan) S Sato	21	21
(Thailand) S Katethong	11	17

Quarterfinals
1	(South Korea) Sung J-h	21	21
5	(Japan) S Sato	12	9

==== Section 2 ====
First Round
3	(India) P. V. Sindhu	21	21
(Switzerland) S Jaquet	17	16
(United States) I Wang	18	20
(Japan) K Imabeppu	21	22
6	(Japan) M Mitani	13	17
(Indonesia) L Fanetri	21	21
PFQ	(Chinese Taipei) Lee C-h	4	9
(China) Chen YF	21	21

Second Round
3	(India) P. V. Sindhu	21	13	21
(Japan) K Imabeppu	13	21	14
(Indonesia) L Fanetri	21	21
(China) Chen YF	18	15

Quarterfinals
3	(India) P. V. Sindhu	21	21
(Indonesia) L Fanetri	10	10

=== Bottom half ===
==== Section 3 ====
First Round
(Indonesia) M F Kusumastuti	21	23
(Hong Kong) Yip P Y	16	21
Q3	(Indonesia) R Hartawan	18	7
7	(Japan) Y Hashimoto	21	21
(Japan) A Ohori	11	14
(China) He BJ	21	21
(Singapore) Liang XY	14	17
4	(South Korea) Bae Y-j	21	21

Second Round
(Indonesia) M F Kusumastuti	13	7
7	(Japan) Y Hashimoto	21	21
(China) He BJ	24	9	16
4	(South Korea) Bae Y-j	22	21	21

Quarterfinals
7	(Japan) Y Hashimoto	13	21	21
4	(South Korea) Bae Y-j	21	18	11

==== Section 4 ====
First Round
(Vietnam) Vu T T	13	17
(Chinese Taipei) Hsu Y-c	21	21
(Netherlands) S de Visch Eijbergen	11	16
8	(Thailand) B Ongbumrungpan	21	21
(Scotland) K Gilmour	21	18	21
Q2	(Malaysia) Lim Y F	16	21	14
Q4	(Japan) S Kawakami	1
2	(Japan) A Yamaguchi	3^{r}

Second Round
(Chinese Taipei) Hsu Y-c	16	21	12
8	(Thailand) B Ongbumrungpan	21	19	21
(Scotland) K Gilmour	21	13	22
Q4	(Japan) S Kawakami	16	21	20

Quarterfinals
8	(Thailand) B Ongbumrungpan	19	10
(Scotland) K Gilmour	21	21

== Men's doubles ==
=== Seeds ===
1. (South Korea) Kim Gi-jung / Kim Sa-rang (semifinals)
2. (Denmark) Mads Conrad-Petersen / Mads Pieler Kolding (withdrawn)
3. (South Korea) Ko Sung-hyun / Shin Baek-cheol (second round)
4. (Indonesia) Angga Pratama / Ricky Karanda Suwardi (withdrawn)
5. (Russia) Vladimir Ivanov / Ivan Sozonov (quarterfinals)
6. (China) Liu Xiaolong / Qiu Zihan (first round)
7. (China) Li Junhui / Liu Yuchen (first round)
8. (Chinese Taipei) Lee Sheng-mu / Tsai Chia-hsin (quarterfinals)

=== Finals ===
Semifinals
1	(South Korea) Kim Gi-jung (South Korea) Kim Sa-rang	21	18	16
(Malaysia) Koo Kien Keat (Malaysia) Tan Boon Heong	15	21	21
(Indonesia) Marcus Fernaldi Gideon (Indonesia) Kevin Sanjaya Sukamuljo	21	21
(Japan) Takeshi Kamura (Japan) Keigo Sonoda	7	17

Final
(Malaysia) Koo Kien Keat (Malaysia) Tan Boon Heong	21	13	18
(Indonesia) Marcus Fernaldi Gideon (Indonesia) Kevin Sanjaya Sukamuljo	18	21	21

=== Top half ===
==== Section 1 ====
First Round
1	(South Korea) Kim G-j (South Korea) Kim S-r	21	21
(China) Huang KX (China) Zheng SW	12	15
(Chinese Taipei) Lin C-y (Chinese Taipei) Wu H-l	18	20
(Japan) H Hashimoto (Japan) N Hirata	21	22
5	(Russia) V Ivanov (Russia) I Sozonov	21	19	21
(Chinese Taipei) Chen H-l (Chinese Taipei) Wang C-l	15	21	14
(Germany) M Fuchs (Germany) J Schöttler
Q1	(Philippines) P G Magnaye (Philippines) A Morada	w	/	o

Second Round
1	(South Korea) Kim G-j (South Korea) Kim S-r	21	21
(Japan) H Hashimoto (Japan) N Hirata	16	15
5	(Russia) V Ivanov (Russia) I Sozonov	21	22
Q1	(Philippines) P G Magnaye (Philippines) A Morada	13	20

Quarterfinals
1	(South Korea) Kim G-j (South Korea) Kim S-r	23	21
5	(Russia) V Ivanov (Russia) I Sozonov	21	19

==== Section 2 ====
First Round
PFQ	(Japan) H Saeki (Japan) R Taohata	22	21
PFQ	(Hong Kong) Chan T K (Hong Kong) Law C H	20	10
(Hong Kong) Or C C (Hong Kong) Tang C M	13	21	17
(Thailand) B Issara (Thailand) N Puangpuapech	21	18	21
7	(China) Li JH (China) Liu YC	17	14
(Chinese Taipei) Lee J-h (Chinese Taipei) Lee Y	21	21
(Malaysia) Koo K K (Malaysia) Tan B H	19	21	21
(Japan) T Hoki (Japan) Y Kobayashi	21	8	19

Second Round
PFQ	(Japan) H Saeki (Japan) R Taohata	23	21	21
(Thailand) B Issara (Thailand) N Puangpuapech	25	19	19
(Chinese Taipei) Lee J-h (Chinese Taipei) Lee Y	12	18
(Malaysia) Koo K K (Malaysia) Tan B H	21	21

Quarterfinals
PFQ	(Japan) H Saeki (Japan) R Taohata	16	22	13
(Malaysia) Koo K K (Malaysia) Tan B H	21	20	21

=== Bottom half ===
==== Section 3 ====
First Round
PFQ	(Philippines) P J Escueta (Philippines) R Estanislao	14	11
Q3	(Malaysia) Low J S (Malaysia) Tan K M	21	21
Q2	(China) He JT (China) Tan Q	17	18
8	(Chinese Taipei) Lee S-m (Chinese Taipei) Tsai C-h	21	21
PFQ	(Egypt) A A El Khateeb (Egypt) A Kashkal	10	10
(Indonesia) M F Gideon (Indonesia) K S Sukamuljo	21	21
(United States) P Chew (United States) S Pongnairat	15	10
3	(South Korea) Ko S-h (South Korea) Shin B-c	21	21

Second Round
Q3	(Malaysia) Low J S (Malaysia) Tan K M	16	19
8	(Chinese Taipei) Lee S-m (Chinese Taipei) Tsai C-h	21	21
(Indonesia) M F Gideon (Indonesia) K S Sukamuljo	21	21
3	(South Korea) Ko S-h (South Korea) Shin B-c	18	17

Quarterfinals
8	(Chinese Taipei) Lee S-m (Chinese Taipei) Tsai C-h	21	20	13
(Indonesia) M F Gideon (Indonesia) K S Sukamuljo	15	22	21

==== Section 4 ====
First Round
(Chinese Taipei) Liao M-c (Chinese Taipei) Tseng M-h	21	21
(Hong Kong) Chan Y L (Hong Kong) Lee C H	10	6
(Malaysia) Goh V S (Malaysia) Tan W K	22	21
6	(China) Liu XL (China) Qiu ZH	20	16
(Indonesia) B Angriawan (Indonesia) R A Saputro	15	7
(Japan) T Kamura (Japan) K Sonoda	21	21
Q4	(Malaysia) Lee J Y (Malaysia) Lim Z T	15	18
PFQ	(Indonesia) H A Gunawan (Indonesia) M Kido	21	21

Second Round
(Chinese Taipei) Liao M-c (Chinese Taipei) Tseng M-h	11	16
(Malaysia) Goh V S (Malaysia) Tan W K	21	21
(Japan) T Kamura (Japan) K Sonoda	27	21	21
PFQ	(Indonesia) H A Gunawan (Indonesia) M Kido	29	16	14

Quarterfinals
(Malaysia) Goh V S (Malaysia) Tan W K	24	16	16
(Japan) T Kamura (Japan) K Sonoda	22	21	21

== Women's doubles ==
=== Seeds ===
1. (Japan) Misaki Matsutomo / Ayaka Takahashi (champion)
2. (South Korea) Chang Ye-na / Lee So-hee (semifinals)
3. (South Korea) Jung Kyung-eun / Shin Seung-chan (first round)
4. (Japan) Naoko Fukuman / Kurumi Yonao (quarterfinals)
5. (China) Tian Qing / Zhao Yunlei (withdrawn)
6. (China) Tang Yuanting / Yu Yang (final)
7. (Netherlands) Eefje Muskens / Selena Piek (second round)
8. (Malaysia) Vivian Hoo Kah Mun / Woon Khe Wei (second round)

=== Finals ===
Semifinals
1	(Japan) Misaki Matsutomo (Japan) Ayaka Takahashi	21	22
Q4	(China) Du Yue (China) Li Yinhui	12	20
6	(China) Tang Yuanting (China) Yu Yang	21	21
2	(South Korea) Chang Ye-na (South Korea) Lee So-hee	12	8

Final
1	(Japan) Misaki Matsutomo (Japan) Ayaka Takahashi	21	22
6	(China) Tang Yuanting (China) Yu Yang	18	20

=== Top half ===
==== Section 1 ====
First Round
1	(Japan) M Matsutomo (Japan) A Takahashi	w	/	o
(Indonesia) P Z Bernadeth (Indonesia) A P Lejarsar Variella
(Chinese Taipei) Hsieh P-c (Chinese Taipei) Wu T-j	12	15
(South Korea) Go A-r (South Korea) Yoo H-w	21	21
PFQ	(Malaysia) Chow M K (Malaysia) Lee M Y	14	21	23
(India) J Gutta (India) A Ponnappa	21	14	25
(Thailand) C Chaladchalam (Thailand) P Muenwong
(Japan) S Matsuo (Japan) M Naito	w	/	o

Second Round
1	(Japan) M Matsutomo (Japan) A Takahashi	21	21
(South Korea) Go A-r (South Korea) Yoo H-w	15	16
(India) J Gutta (India) A Ponnappa	14	17
(Japan) S Matsuo (Japan) M Naito	21	21

Quarterfinals
1	(Japan) M Matsutomo (Japan) A Takahashi	21	19	21
(Japan) S Matsuo (Japan) M Naito	18	21	14

==== Section 2 ====
First Round
3	(South Korea) Jung K-e (South Korea) Shin S-c	19	22	16
(Thailand) J Kittiharakul (Thailand) R Prajongjai	21	20	21
(Japan) Y Fukushima (Japan) S Hirota	21	21
PFQ	(Malaysia) Joyce Choong W C (Malaysia) Yap C W	12	10
8	(Malaysia) Vivian Hoo K M (Malaysia) Woon K W	21	21
Q2	(Japan) M Matsumoto (Japan) W Nagahara	13	18
Q4	(China) Du Y (China) Li YH	16	21	22
(Indonesia) D D Haris (Indonesia) R E Putri Sari	21	10	20

Second Round
(Thailand) J Kittiharakul (Thailand) R Prajongjai	11	9
(Japan) Y Fukushima (Japan) S Hirota	21	21
8	(Malaysia) Vivian Hoo K M (Malaysia) Woon K W	10	19
Q4	(China) Du Y (China) Li YH	21	21

Quarterfinals
(Japan) Y Fukushima (Japan) S Hirota	16	17
Q4	(China) Du Y (China) Li YH	21	21

=== Bottom half ===
==== Section 3 ====
First Round
(Hong Kong) Tse Y S (Hong Kong) Yeung N T	w	/	o
(Germany) J Goliszewski (Germany) C Nelte
(Indonesia) A S Awanda (Indonesia) N K Mahadewi Istirani	14	20
6	(China) Tang YT (China) Yu Y	21	22
(Russia) E Bolotova (Russia) E Kosetskaya	17	21
(Chinese Taipei) Chiang K-h (Chinese Taipei) Wu F-c	21	23
(Malaysia) A A Anscelly (Malaysia) Soong F C	9	13
4	(Japan) N Fukuman (Japan) K Yonao	21	21

Second Round
(Hong Kong) Tse Y S (Hong Kong) Yeung N T	7	16
6	(China) Tang YT (China) Yu Y	21	21
(Chinese Taipei) Chiang K-h (Chinese Taipei) Wu F-c	16	11
4	(Japan) N Fukuman (Japan) K Yonao	21	21

Quarterfinals
6	(China) Tang YT (China) Yu Y	24	21
4	(Japan) N Fukuman (Japan) K Yonao	22	15

==== Section 4 ====
First Round
Q1	(Chinese Taipei) Chen H-h (Chinese Taipei) Huang M-c	9	8
(Japan) S Tanaka (Japan) K Yonemoto	21	21
(Thailand) P Supajirakul (Thailand) S Taerattanachai	21	16	13
7	(Netherlands) E Muskens (Netherlands) S Piek	12	21	21
(Chinese Taipei) Hsu Y-c (Chinese Taipei) Pai Y-p	17	11
(Indonesia) K N Hanadia (Indonesia) D T Permatasari	21	21
Q3	(Malaysia) Goh Y C (Malaysia) Peck Y W	16	15
2	(South Korea) Chang Y-n (South Korea) Lee S-h	21	21

Second Round
(Japan) S Tanaka (Japan) K Yonemoto	21	21
7	(Netherlands) E Muskens (Netherlands) S Piek	16	17
(Indonesia) K N Hanadia (Indonesia) D T Permatasari	10	11
2	(South Korea) Chang Y-n (South Korea) Lee S-h	21	21

Quarterfinals
(Japan) S Tanaka (Japan) K Yonemoto	21	17	12
2	(South Korea) Chang Y-n (South Korea) Lee S-h	12	21	21

== Mixed doubles ==
=== Seeds ===
1. (Indonesia) Tontowi Ahmad / Liliyana Natsir (first round)
2. (South Korea) Ko Sung-hyun / Kim Ha-na (withdrawn)
3. (Indonesia) Praveen Jordan / Debby Susanto (first round)
4. (Hong Kong) Lee Chun Hei / Chau Hoi Wah (semifinals)
5. (South Korea) Shin Baek-cheol / Chae Yoo-jung (quarterfinals)
6. (South Korea) Choi Sol-gyu / Eom Hye-won (second round)
7. (Netherlands) Jacco Arends / Selena Piek (first round)
8. (Malaysia) Chan Peng Soon / Goh Liu Ying (semifinals)

=== Finals ===
Semifinals
(China) Zheng Siwei (China) Li Yinhui	21	21
4	(Hong Kong) Lee Chun Hei (Hong Kong) Chau Hoi Wah	17	14
Q1	(Malaysia) Tan Kian Meng (Malaysia) Lai Pei Jing	21	21
8	(Malaysia) Chan Peng Soon (Malaysia) Goh Liu Ying	17	16

Final
(China) Zheng Siwei (China) Li Yinhui	21	21
Q1	(Malaysia) Tan Kian Meng (Malaysia) Lai Pei Jing	14	19

=== Top half ===
==== Section 1 ====
First Round
1	(Indonesia) T Ahmad (Indonesia) L Natsir	15	21	17
(China) Zheng SW (China) Li YH	21	10	21
Q2	(Malaysia) Tan C T (Malaysia) Chow M K	22	17	16
(Japan) K Kazuno (Japan) A Kurihara	20	21	21
5	(South Korea) Shin B-c (South Korea) Chae Y-j	21	21
(Chinese Taipei) Liao M-c (Chinese Taipei) Chen H-h	17	10
Q4	(Malaysia) Wong F Y (Malaysia) Shevon J L	21	21
(United States) P Chew (United States) J Subandhi	10	11

Second Round
(China) Zheng SW (China) Li YH	21	21
(Japan) K Kazuno (Japan) A Kurihara	18	14
5	(South Korea) Shin B-c (South Korea) Chae Y-j	23	21
Q4	(Malaysia) Wong F Y (Malaysia) Shevon J L	21	10

Quarterfinals
(China) Zheng SW (China) Li YH	21	16	21
5	(South Korea) Shin B-c (South Korea) Chae Y-j	17	21	19

==== Section 2 ====
First Round
4	(Hong Kong) Lee C H (Hong Kong) Chau H W	21	21
(Thailand) S Prapakamol (Thailand) S Thoungthongkam	17	13
(Singapore) D B Chrisnanta (Singapore) V Neo	19	16
(South Korea) Kim G-j (South Korea) Shin S-c	21	21
7	(Netherlands) J Arends (Netherlands) S Piek	13	12
(Indonesia) R Alexander (Indonesia) M D Oktaviani	21	21
(Russia) E Dremin (Russia) E Dimova	w	/	o
(Germany) M Fuchs (Germany) B Michels

Second Round
4	(Hong Kong) Lee C H (Hong Kong) Chau H W	21	21
(South Korea) Kim G-j (South Korea) Shin S-c	15	13
(Indonesia) R Alexander (Indonesia) M D Oktaviani	21	12	21
(Russia) E Dremin (Russia) E Dimova	12	21	11

Quarterfinals
4	(Hong Kong) Lee C H (Hong Kong) Chau H W	13	21	21
(Indonesia) R Alexander (Indonesia) M D Oktaviani	21	14	16

=== Bottom half ===
==== Section 3 ====
First Round
(Japan) K Sonoda (Japan) N Fukuman	21	21
(Egypt) A Kashkal (Egypt) H Hosny	7	5
Q3	(Chinese Taipei) Lee J-h (Chinese Taipei) Chen S-y	14	15
6	(South Korea) Choi S-g (South Korea) Eom H-w	21	21
(China) Huang KX (China) Huang DP	19	19
(France) R Labar (France) E Lefel	21	21
Q1	(Malaysia) Tan K M (Malaysia) Lai P J	21	21
3	(Indonesia) P Jordan (Indonesia) D Susanto	10	16

Second Round
(Japan) K Sonoda (Japan) N Fukuman	21	19	21
6	(South Korea) Choi S-g (South Korea) Eom H-w	17	21	16
(France) R Labar (France) E Lefel	10	17
Q1	(Malaysia) Tan K M (Malaysia) Lai P J	21	21

Quarterfinals
(Japan) K Sonoda (Japan) N Fukuman	10	15
Q1	(Malaysia) Tan K M (Malaysia) Lai P J	21	21

==== Section 4 ====
First Round
PFQ	(Chinese Taipei) Chang K-c (Chinese Taipei) Chang H-t	14	18
(Indonesia) I Fadhilah (Indonesia) W Anggraini	21	21
(Japan) R Taohata (Japan) K Yonemoto	15	16
8	(Malaysia) Chan P S (Malaysia) Goh L Y	21	21
PFQ	(Indonesia) K S Sukamuljo (Indonesia) D D Haris	21	21
(Chinese Taipei) Lin C-y (Chinese Taipei) Wu T-j	16	16
(Hong Kong) Chan Y L (Hong Kong) Tse Y S	8	21	11
PFQ	(Indonesia) H Faisal (Indonesia) S D Aulia	21	17	21

Second Round
(Indonesia) I Fadhilah (Indonesia) W Anggraini	12	21	12
8	(Malaysia) Chan P S (Malaysia) Goh L Y	21	17	21
PFQ	(Indonesia) K S Sukamuljo (Indonesia) D D Haris	17	19
PFQ	(Indonesia) H Faisal (Indonesia) S D Aulia	21	21

Quarterfinals
8	(Malaysia) Chan P S (Malaysia) Goh L Y	21	21
PFQ	(Indonesia) H Faisal (Indonesia) S D Aulia	13	18

Preceded by 2015 Mexico City Grand Prix	BWF Grand Prix and Grand Prix Gold; 2016 BWF Season	Succeeded by 2016 Syed Modi International Grand Prix Gold
