= 2017 Thailand Open Grand Prix Gold =

Tournament details
- Dates: 30 May – 4 June 2017
- Level: Grand Prix Gold
- Total prize money: US$120,000
- Venue: Nimibutr Stadium
- Location: Bangkok, Thailand

Champions
- Men's singles: (India) B. Sai Praneeth
- Women's singles: (Thailand) Ratchanok Intanon
- Men's doubles: (Indonesia) Berry Angriawan (Indonesia) Hardianto
- Women's doubles: (Indonesia) Greysia Polii (Indonesia) Apriyani Rahayu
- Mixed doubles: (China) He Jiting (China) Du Yue

The 2017 Thailand Open Grand Prix Gold will be the seventh grand prix's badminton tournament of the 2017 BWF Grand Prix Gold and Grand Prix. The tournament will be held at Nimibutr Stadium in Bangkok in Thailand 30 May – 4 June 2017 and had a total purse of $120,000.

== Men's singles ==
=== Seeds ===
1. (Thailand) Tanongsak Saensomboonsuk (quarterfinals)
2. (Germany) Marc Zwiebler (third round)
3. (India) B. Sai Praneeth (champion)
4. (Indonesia) Jonatan Christie (final)
5. (France) Brice Leverdez (quarterfinals)
6. (Indonesia) Ihsan Maulana Mustofa (withdrew)
7. (Malaysia) Zulfadli Zulkiffli (second round)
8. (Hong Kong) Wei Nan (second round)
9. (Malaysia) Iskandar Zulkarnain Zainuddin (third round)
10. (Indonesia) Sony Dwi Kuncoro (first round)
11. (Spain) Pablo Abián (first round)
12. (India) Sourabh Verma (third round)
13. (Malaysia) Chong Wei Feng (third round)
14. (Denmark) Emil Holst (first round)
15. (Thailand) Khosit Phetpradab (third round)
16. (Thailand) Suppanyu Avihingsanon (third round)

=== Finals ===
Quarterfinals
1	(Thailand) Tanongsak Saensomboonsuk	17	21	8
(Thailand) Pannawit Thongnuam	21	17	21
3	(India) B. Sai Praneeth	21	21
(Thailand) Kantaphon Wangcharoen	16	17
5	(France) Brice Leverdez	15	19
4	(Indonesia) Jonatan Christie	21	21
(Hong Kong) Lee Cheuk Yiu	19	11
(Malaysia) Soong Joo Ven	21	21

Semifinals
(Thailand) Pannawit Thongnuam	11	15
3	(India) B. Sai Praneeth	21	21
4	(Indonesia) Jonatan Christie	21	21
(Malaysia) Soong Joo Ven	9	18

Final
3	(India) B. Sai Praneeth	17	21	21
4	(Indonesia) Jonatan Christie	21	18	19

=== Top half ===
==== Section 1 ====
First Round
1	(Thailand) T Saensomboonsuk	21	21
(Slovakia) M Hlinican	16	12
(India) P Joshi	13
(Sweden) H Hurskainen	11^{r}
16	(Thailand) S Avihingsanon	21	21
(India) R Y Chittaboina	15	17
(Thailand) A Namkul	19	21	17
(India) S Jaiswal	21	11	21

Second Round
1	(Thailand) T Saensomboonsuk	21	21
(India) P Joshi	17	9
16	(Thailand) S Avihingsanon	21	21
(India) S Jaiswal	9	18

Third Round
1	(Thailand) T Saensomboonsuk	21	21
16	(Thailand) S Avihingsanon	17	16

==== Section 2 ====
First Round
PFQ	(Indonesia) R Subagja	21	21
Q2	(India) K. G. Kumar	14	19
(Malaysia) Tan C S	21	13	17
(Thailand) P Thongnuam	13	21	21
10	(Indonesia) S D Kuncoro	19	21	17
PFQ	(Thailand) K Vitidsarn	21	14	21
(Denmark) S Toft	21	10	12
(Thailand) K Leelavechabutr	17	21	21

Second Round
PFQ	(Indonesia) R Subagja	13	13
(Thailand) P Thongnuam	21	21
PFQ	(Thailand) K Vitidsarn	21	21
(Thailand) K Leelavechabutr	15	14

Third Round
(Thailand) P Thongnuam	21	10	22
PFQ	(Thailand) K Vitidsarn	17	21	20

==== Section 3 ====
First Round
3	(India) B. S Praneeth	21	18
(Indonesia) N E Sulistyo	10	9^{r}
(Malaysia) Satheishtharan R.	21	21
(Thailand) K Imnark	9	19
9	(Malaysia) I Z Zainuddin	21	21
(India) H Dani	14	16
(India) R. M. V. Gurusaidutt	12	12
(Indonesia) P A Maulana	21	21

Second Round
3	(India) B. S Praneeth	21	21
(Malaysia) Satheishtharan R.	15	13
9	(Malaysia) I Z Zainuddin	21	21
(Indonesia) P A Maulana	14	17

Third Round
3	(India) B. S Praneeth	21	21
9	(Malaysia) I Z Zainuddin	13	18

==== Section 4 ====
First Round
8	(Hong Kong) Wei N	21	21
(Brunei) Jaspar Yu W C	16	7
(Thailand) K Wangcharoen	21	21
(India) A K A Kumar	10	8
13	(Malaysia) Chong W F	23	21
(Thailand) K Laotrakul	21	16
(Indonesia) M B Pangisthu	25	16	21
(Thailand) M Narongrit	23	21	19

Second Round
8	(Hong Kong) Wei N	21	21	21
(Thailand) K Wangcharoen	23	13	23
13	(Malaysia) Chong W F	9	21	21
(Indonesia) M B Pangisthu	21	17	11

Third Round
(Thailand) K Wangcharoen	21	21
13	(Malaysia) Chong W F	19	8

=== Bottom half ===
==== Section 5 ====
First Round
(India) A Pawar	21	21
Q1	(Hong Kong) Chan Y C	20	12
Q7	(Indonesia) H Christeven	15	13
12	(India) S Verma	21	21
(Indonesia) H Kho Wibowo	21	23
(India) H M.Gowda	17	21
Q3	(Malaysia) Vincent C W P	10	12
5	(France) B Leverdez	21	21

Second Round
(India) A Pawar	17	22	14
12	(India) S Verma	21	20	21
(Indonesia) H Kho Wibowo	10	20
5	(France) B Leverdez	21	22

Third Round
12	(India) S Verma	16	25	11
5	(France) B Leverdez	21	23	21

==== Section 6 ====
First Round
(Indonesia) F I Hadmadi	21	13	21
(India) S Verma	16	21	17
(China) Sun FX	21	17	18
15	(Thailand) K Phetpradab	16	21	21
(India) A Yelegar	19	13
Q6	(China) Bai YP	21	21
PFQ	(India) C. R Yadav	12	16
4	(Indonesia) J Christie	21	21

Second Round
(Indonesia) F I Hadmadi	20	14
15	(Thailand) K Phetpradab	22	21
Q6	(China) Bai YP	9	21
4	(Indonesia) J Christie	21	23

Third Round
15	(Thailand) K Phetpradab	16	9
4	(Indonesia) J Christie	21	21

==== Section 7 ====
First Round
Q4	(Thailand) S Piyawatcharavijit	11	10
(India) S Dey	21	21
(Malaysia) Liew D	w	/	o
11	(Spain) P Abián
(Malaysia) Zh Zulkiffli	16	15
(Hong Kong) Lee C Y	21	21
Q8	(Thailand) P Jarasjindawong	12	6
7	(Malaysia) Zf Zulkiffli	21	21

Second Round
(India) S Dey	21	15	19
(Malaysia) Liew D	10	21	21
(Hong Kong) Lee C Y	21	21
7	(Malaysia) Zf Zulkiffli	16	11

Third Round
(Malaysia) Liew D	15	21	14
(Hong Kong) Lee C Y	21	14	21

==== Section 8 ====
First Round
Q5	(Thailand) P Srimanta	15	18
(Thailand) N Singrueang	21	21
(Malaysia) Soong J V	21	21	21
14	(Denmark) E Holst	10	23	16
(Slovakia) M Dratva	6	14
(India) K Parupalli	21	21
(India) A Joshi	11	12
2	(Germany) M Zwiebler	21	21

Second Round
(Thailand) N Singrueang	12	21	13
(Malaysia) Soong J V	21	19	21
(India) K Parupalli	14	18
2	(Germany) M Zwiebler	21	21

Third Round
(Malaysia) Soong J V	22	21
2	(Germany) M Zwiebler	20	9

== Women's singles ==
=== Seeds ===
1. (Thailand) Ratchanok Intanon (champion)
2. (India) Saina Nehwal (semifinals)
3. (United States) Beiwen Zhang (semifinals)
4. (Thailand) Busanan Ongbamrungphan (final)
5. (Thailand) Nitchaon Jindapol (quarterfinals)
6. (Thailand) Pornpawee Chochuwong (quarterfinals)
7. (Canada) Michelle Li (first round)
8. (Germany) Fabienne Deprez (first round)

=== Finals ===
Semifinals
1	(Thailand) Ratchanok Intanon	21	21
3	(United States) Beiwen Zhang	18	15
4	(Thailand) Busanan Ongbamrungphan	21	21
2	(India) Saina Nehwal	19	18

Final
1	(Thailand) Ratchanok Intanon	21	12	21
4	(Thailand) Busanan Ongbamrungphan	18	21	16

=== Top half ===
==== Section 1 ====
First Round
1	(Thailand) R Intanon	21	21
(India) R Das	19	18
(Indonesia) F Angguni	6	8
(Japan) S Takahashi	21	21
5	(Thailand) N Jindapol	22	21
(Germany) Y Li	20	16
(Indonesia) S Fatmawati	21	21
(India) R S Gadde	18	11

Second Round
1	(Thailand) R Intanon	24	10	21
(Japan) S Takahashi	22	21	18
5	(Thailand) N Jindapol	21	21
(Indonesia) S Fatmawati	18	19

Quarterfinals
1	(Thailand) R Intanon	21	21
5	(Thailand) N Jindapol	13	15

==== Section 2 ====
First Round
3	(United States) B Zhang	21	21
(Finland) A Mikkela	4	11
(Indonesia) R Hartawan	21	21
(India) S K P Kudaravalli	14	12
6	(Thailand) P Chochuwong	21	21
Q2	(Thailand) C Jucharoen	9	12
(India) S Rane	21	13	12
(Malaysia) Ho Y M	19	21	21

Second Round
3	(United States) B Zhang	21	21
(Indonesia) R Hartawan	17	15
6	(Thailand) P Chochuwong	18	21	21
(Malaysia) Ho Y M	21	12	17

Quarterfinals
3	(United States) B Zhang	21	21
6	(Thailand) P Chochuwong	18	18

=== Bottom half ===
==== Section 3 ====
First Round
(Indonesia) J Muljati	21	22	25
(India) S U R Chukka	13	24	27
Q4	(Thailand) P Chaiwan	21	21
7	(Canada) M Li	15	10
(Indonesia) Y Y Susanto	21	21
(India) R Karthik	14	12
(Indonesia) R A Riodingin	8	9
4	(Thailand) B Ongbamrungphan	21	21

Second Round
(India) S U R Chukka	15	17
Q4	(Thailand) P Chaiwan	21	21
(Indonesia) Y Y Susanto	5	6
4	(Thailand) B Ongbamrungphan	21	21

Quarterfinals
Q4	(Thailand) P Chaiwan	16	12
4	(Thailand) B Ongbamrungphan	21	21

==== Section 4 ====
First Round
Q3	(Thailand) S Katethong	21	21
(Indonesia) G M Tunjung	15	17
Q1	(Japan) H Suzuki	25	16	21
8	(Germany) F Deprez	23	21	6
(Malaysia) Lee Y Y	21	21
(Indonesia) A D Widyaningrum	13	13
(Slovakia) M Repiska	5	10
2	(India) S Nehwal	21	21

Second Round
Q3	(Thailand) S Katethong	8	21	17
Q1	(Japan) H Suzuki	21	17	21
(Malaysia) Lee Y Y	11	14
2	(India) S Nehwal	21	21

Quarterfinals
Q1	(Japan) H Suzuki	15	22	11
2	(India) S Nehwal	21	20	21

== Men's doubles ==
=== Seeds ===
1. (Denmark) Kim Astrup / Anders Skaarup Rasmussen (second round)
2. (Thailand) Bodin Isara / Nipitphon Phuangphuapet (second round)
3. (Indonesia) Fajar Alfian / Muhammad Rian Ardianto (quarterfinals)
4. (England) Marcus Ellis / Chris Langridge (semifinals)
5. (Indonesia) Berry Angriawan / Hardianto (champion)
6. (Thailand) Kittinupong Kedren / Dechapol Puavaranukroh (second round)
7. (Germany) Jones Ralfy Jansen / Josche Zurwonne (quarterfinals)
8. (Singapore) Danny Bawa Chrisnanta / Hendra Wijaya (first round)

=== Finals ===
Semifinals
(Germany) Raphael Beck (Germany) Peter Kaesbauer	21	14	21
(Germany) Mark Lamsfuss (Germany) Marvin Emil Seidel	18	21	19
4	(England) Marcus Ellis (England) Chris Langridge	20	21	9
5	(Indonesia) Berry Angriawan (Indonesia) Hardianto	22	18	21

Final
(Germany) Raphael Beck (Germany) Peter Kaesbauer	16	16
5	(Indonesia) Berry Angriawan (Indonesia) Hardianto	21	21

=== Top half ===
==== Section 1 ====
First Round
1	(Denmark) K Astrup (Denmark) A S Rasmussen	21	21
(China) He JT (China) Tan Q	9	19
(India) Arjun M.R. (India) R Shlok	21	12	13
(Thailand) T Isriyanet (Thailand) K Namdash	15	21	21
6	(Thailand) K Kedren (Thailand) D Puavaranukroh	21	21
(Indonesia) T Wardhana (Indonesia) A Y Wirawan	10	8
Q4	(Thailand) K Tantianankul (Thailand) T Viriyangkura	12	14
(Germany) R Beck (Germany) P Kaesbauer	21	21

Second Round
1	(Denmark) K Astrup (Denmark) A S Rasmussen	21	15	19
(Thailand) T Isriyanet (Thailand) K Namdash	18	21	21
6	(Thailand) K Kedren (Thailand) D Puavaranukroh	22	21	20
(Germany) R Beck (Germany) P Kaesbauer	24	14	22

Quarterfinals
(Thailand) T Isriyanet (Thailand) K Namdash	16	14
(Germany) R Beck (Germany) P Kaesbauer	21	21

==== Section 2 ====
First Round
3	(Indonesia) F Alfian (Indonesia) M R Ardianto	16	21	21
(Malaysia) Chooi K M (Malaysia) Low J S	21	16	16
Q2	(Malaysia) Lim K W (Malaysia) Ooi Z H	21	19	18
(Thailand) T Potieng (Thailand) N Yordphaisong	13	21	21
8	(Singapore) D B Chrisnanta (Singapore) H Wijaya	21	17
(Germany) M Lamsfuss (Germany) M E Seidel	23	21
PFQ	(Thailand) W Ampunsuwan (Thailand) I Apisuk	21	21
(Vietnam) Bao M (Vietnam) Duong B D	10	13

Second Round
3	(Indonesia) F Alfian (Indonesia) M R Ardianto	21	21
(Thailand) T Potieng (Thailand) N Yordphaisong	10	13
(Germany) M Lamsfuss (Germany) M E Seidel	21	21
PFQ	(Thailand) W Ampunsuwan (Thailand) I Apisuk	11	15

Quarterfinals
3	(Indonesia) F Alfian (Indonesia) M R Ardianto	10	20
(Germany) M Lamsfuss (Germany) M E Seidel	21	22

=== Bottom half ===
==== Section 3 ====
First Round
(India) A Francis (India) T Kona	9	18
(Singapore) Hee Y K (Singapore) Loh K H	21	21
(Slovakia) M Dratva (Slovakia) M Hlinican	9	14
7	(Germany) J R Jansen (Germany) J Zurwonne	21	21
Q1	(Malaysia) Arif A L (Malaysia) Syawal M I	12	13
(Indonesia) H Setiawan (Malaysia) Tan B H	21	21
(Indonesia) H A Gunawan (Indonesia) M Kido	15	21	13
4	(England) M Ellis (England) C Langridge	21	16	21

Second Round
(Singapore) Hee Y K (Singapore) Loh K H	21	11	20
7	(Germany) J R Jansen (Germany) J Zurwonne	17	21	22
(Indonesia) H Setiawan (Malaysia) Tan B H	23	14	18
4	(England) M Ellis (England) C Langridge	21	21	21

Quarterfinals
7	(Germany) J R Jansen (Germany) J Zurwonne	15	21	14
4	(England) M Ellis (England) C Langridge	21	13	21

==== Section 4 ====
First Round
(Malaysia) Goh S F (Malaysia) N Izzuddin	17	20
Q3	(Malaysia) Tan J H (Malaysia) Wong W J	21	22
(Sweden) R Eidestedt (Sweden) N Ruponen	21	14	16
5	(Indonesia) B Angriawan (Indonesia) Hardianto	19	21	21
(Indonesia) L A Nugroho (Indonesia) T Supriadi	10	14
(China) Han CK (China) Zhou HD	21	21
(Malaysia) Lee J Y (Malaysia) Lim Z T	13	14
2	(Thailand) B Isara (Thailand) N Phuangphuapet	21	21

Second Round
Q3	(Malaysia) Tan J H (Malaysia) Wong W J	6	16
5	(Indonesia) B Angriawan (Indonesia) Hardianto	21	21
(China) Han CK (China) Zhou HD	7	21	21
2	(Thailand) B Isara (Thailand) N Phuangphuapet	21	16	15

Quarterfinals
5	(Indonesia) B Angriawan (Indonesia) Hardianto	21	24
(China) Han CK (China) Zhou HD	18	22

== Women's doubles ==
=== Seeds ===
1. (Thailand) Puttita Supajirakul / Sapsiree Taerattanachai (withdrew)
2. (Thailand) Jongkolphan Kititharakul / Rawinda Prajongjai (quarterfinals)
3. (Malaysia) Lim Yin Loo / Yap Cheng Wen (second round)
4. (Australia) Setyana Mapasa / Gronya Somerville (quarterfinals)
5. (Indonesia) Greysia Polii / Apriyani Rahayu (champion)
6. (China) Du Yue / Xu Ya (semifinals)
7. (Indonesia) Keshya Nurvita Hanadia / Devi Tika Permatasari (quarterfinals)
8. (India) Meghana Jakkampudi / Poorvisha S Ram (first round)

=== Finals ===
Semifinals
PFQ	(Thailand) Savitree Amitrapai (Thailand) Pacharapun Chochuwong	26	16	13
5	(Indonesia) Greysia Polii (Indonesia) Apriyani Rahayu	24	21	21
(Thailand) Chayanit Chaladchalam (Thailand) Phataimas Muenwong	21	21
6	(China) Du Yue (China) Xu Ya	19	9

Final
5	(Indonesia) Greysia Polii (Indonesia) Apriyani Rahayu	21	21
(Thailand) Chayanit Chaladchalam (Thailand) Phataimas Muenwong	12	12

=== Top half ===
==== Section 1 ====
First Round
PFQ	(Thailand) S Amitrapai (Thailand) P Chochuwong	21	21
(Indonesia) A P L Variella (Indonesia) L M Pertiwi	14	13
(Indonesia) D Fitriani (Indonesia) N Melati	21	21
PFQ	(Thailand) K Khongdee (Thailand) A Sapniti	13	16
8	(India) M Jakkampudi (India) P S Ram	10	18
(Indonesia) T O Kusumah (Indonesia) N P Lestari	21	21
(Germany) J Goliszewski (Germany) L Kaepplein	19	21	22
Q1	(Germany) I Herttrich (Germany) O Konon	21	18	24

Second Round
PFQ	(Thailand) S Amitrapai (Thailand) P Chochuwong	21	20	21
(Indonesia) D Fitriani (Indonesia) N Melati	15	22	13
(Indonesia) T O Kusumah (Indonesia) N P Lestari	21	14	21
Q1	(Germany) I Herttrich (Germany) O Konon	17	21	16

Quarterfinals
PFQ	(Thailand) S Amitrapai (Thailand) P Chochuwong	21	21
(Indonesia) T O Kusumah (Indonesia) N P Lestari	16	11

==== Section 2 ====
First Round
4	(Australia) S Mapasa (Australia) G Somerville	21	21
(Thailand) N Chatupornkarnchana (Thailand) S Chumnibannakarn	12	12
(Thailand) P Chamnaktan (Thailand) T Wongya	16	15
Q3	(Thailand) R Laisuan (Thailand) S Mingchua	21	21
5	(Indonesia) G Polii (Indonesia) A Rahayu	21	21
Q2	(Indonesia) S D Augustia (Indonesia) R A Riodingin	17	8
(Malaysia) Goh Y C (Malaysia) Teoh M X	21	21
(Thailand) C Charoenwat (Thailand) P Eksorakul	15	17

Second Round
4	(Australia) S Mapasa (Australia) G Somerville	14	21	21
Q3	(Thailand) R Laisuan (Thailand) S Mingchua	21	12	18
5	(Indonesia) G Polii (Indonesia) A Rahayu	21	21
(Malaysia) Goh Y C (Malaysia) Teoh M X	10	16

Quarterfinals
4	(Australia) S Mapasa (Australia) G Somerville	20	11
5	(Indonesia) G Polii (Indonesia) A Rahayu	22	21

=== Bottom half ===
==== Section 3 ====
First Round
Q4	(Thailand) S Paewsampran (Thailand) K Sudjaipraparat	21	21
(Thailand) T Kleebyeesoon (Thailand) W Patimon	17	14
(Sweden) C Nistad (Sweden) E Wengberg	14	22	21
7	(Indonesia) K N Hanadia (Indonesia) D T Permatasari	21	20	23
(Indonesia) C S Ayunidha (Indonesia) D R Vehrenica	10	7
(Thailand) C Chaladchalam (Thailand) P Muenwong	21	21
(Thailand) S Kanchanasaka (Thailand) K Sukklad	10	12
3	(Malaysia) Lim Y L (Malaysia) Yap C W	21	21

Second Round
Q4	(Thailand) S Paewsampran (Thailand) K Sudjaipraparat	17	22	19
7	(Indonesia) K N Hanadia (Indonesia) D T Permatasari	21	20	21
(Thailand) C Chaladchalam (Thailand) P Muenwong	24	19	21
3	(Malaysia) Lim Y L (Malaysia) Yap C W	22	21	19

Quarterfinals
7	(Indonesia) K N Hanadia (Indonesia) D T Permatasari	21	6	13
(Thailand) C Chaladchalam (Thailand) P Muenwong	11	21	21

==== Section 4 ====
First Round
(Thailand) M Bowonwitthanakul (Thailand) S Suppasang	10	6
(Indonesia) R Amelia (Malaysia) Anna Cheong C Y	21	21
(Indonesia) Y Barkah (Indonesia) M C Sahputri	16	16
6	(China) Du Y (China) Xu Y	21	21
(Hong Kong) Ng T Y (Hong Kong) Yeung N T	19	12
(Thailand) K Dubthuk (Thailand) N Saengchote	21	21
(Germany) L Efler (Germany) E Janssens	12	17
2	(Thailand) J Kititharakul (Thailand) R Prajongjai	21	21

Second Round
(Indonesia) R Amelia (Malaysia) Anna Cheong C Y	19	21	14
6	(China) Du Y (China) Xu Y	21	18	21
(Thailand) K Dubthuk (Thailand) N Saengchote	12	11
2	(Thailand) J Kititharakul (Thailand) R Prajongjai	21	21

Quarterfinals
6	(China) Du Y (China) Xu Y	13	21	21
2	(Thailand) J Kititharakul (Thailand) R Prajongjai	21	15	13

== Mixed doubles ==
=== Seeds ===
1. (Thailand) Dechapol Puavaranukroh / Sapsiree Taerattanachai (semifinals)
2. (Singapore) Terry Hee Yong Kai / Tan Wei Han (semifinals)
3. (Thailand) Bodin Isara / Savitree Amitrapai (second round)
4. (Thailand) Nipitphon Phuangphuapet / Jongkolphan Kititharakul (second round)
5. (Malaysia) Goh Soon Huat / Shevon Jemie Lai (final)
6. (Sweden) Nico Ruponen / Amanda Hogstrom (first round)
7. (Germany) Mark Lamsfuss / Isabel Herttrich (quarterfinals)
8. (Indonesia) Ronald Alexander / Annisa Saufika (quarterfinals)

=== Finals ===
Semifinals
1	(Thailand) Dechapol Puavaranukroh (Thailand) Sapsiree Taerattanachai	19	21	17
5	(Malaysia) Goh Soon Huat (Malaysia) Shevon Jemie Lai	21	19	21
(China) He Jiting (China) Du Yue	23	21
2	(Singapore) Terry Hee Yong Kai (Singapore) Tan Wei Han	21	19

Final
5	(Malaysia) Goh Soon Huat (Malaysia) Shevon Jemie Lai	13	21	12
(China) He Jiting (China) Du Yue	21	16	21

=== Top half ===
==== Section 1 ====
First Round
1	(Thailand) D Puavaranukroh (Thailand) S Taerattanachai	21	21
PFQ	(Thailand) N Singrueang (Thailand) T Wongya	7	19
(Thailand) C Charoenkitamorn (Thailand) C Korepap	13	12
(Malaysia) Y Khrishnan (India) P Sawant	21	21
7	(Germany) M Lamsfuss (Germany) I Herttrich	21	21
(Thailand) W Buranakuea (Thailand) N Saengchote	14	12
(Indonesia) L A Nugroho (Indonesia) R Amelia	18	21	21
(Thailand) S Jomkoh (Thailand) S Paewsampran	21	12	16

Second Round
1	(Thailand) D Puavaranukroh (Thailand) S Taerattanachai	21	21
(Malaysia) Y Khrishnan (India) P Sawant	10	9
7	(Germany) M Lamsfuss (Germany) I Herttrich	21	21
(Indonesia) L A Nugroho (Indonesia) R Amelia	16	14

Quarterfinals
1	(Thailand) D Puavaranukroh (Thailand) S Taerattanachai	21	21
7	(Germany) M Lamsfuss (Germany) I Herttrich	15	18

==== Section 2 ====
First Round
4	(Thailand) N Phuangphuapet (Thailand) J Kititharakul	21	21
Q1	(China) Zhou HD (China) Xu Y	14	14
(Thailand) T Viriyangkura (Thailand) R Prajongjai	9	19
Q3	(China) Han CK (China) Chen Lu	21	21
5	(Malaysia) Goh S H (Malaysia) S J Lai	21	21
(Indonesia) F S Surbakti (Indonesia) D R Vehrenica	11	10
(Indonesia) I Fadhilah (Indonesia) W Anggraini	16	21	21
(Malaysia) M A Abdul Latif (Indonesia) D T Permatasari	21	14	16

Second Round
4	(Thailand) N Phuangphuapet (Thailand) J Kititharakul	21	18	19
Q3	(China) Han CK (China) Chen Lu	14	21	21
5	(Malaysia) Goh S H (Malaysia) S J Lai	21	18	21
(Indonesia) I Fadhilah (Indonesia) W Anggraini	11	21	14

Quarterfinals
Q3	(China) Han CK (China) Chen Lu	17	16
5	(Malaysia) Goh S H (Malaysia) S J Lai	21	21

=== Bottom half ===
==== Section 3 ====
First Round
Q4	(Indonesia) A Anhar (Indonesia) K N Hanadia	18	21	13
(Germany) M E Seidel (Germany) L Efler	21	15	21
(Thailand) T Isriyanet (Thailand) P Chochuwong	21	13	21
6	(Sweden) N Ruponen (Sweden) A Hogstrom	17	21	15
(China) He JT (China) Du Y	21	21
(Malaysia) Hoo P R (Malaysia) Peck Y W	10	11
(Germany) R Beck (Germany) E Janssens	10	12
3	(Thailand) B Isara (Thailand) S Amitrapai	21	21

Second Round
(Germany) M E Seidel (Germany) L Efler	27	9	21
(Thailand) T Isriyanet (Thailand) P Chochuwong	25	21	10
(China) He JT (China) Du Y	18	21	24
3	(Thailand) B Isara (Thailand) S Amitrapai	21	12	22

Quarterfinals
(Germany) M E Seidel (Germany) L Efler	19	12
(China) He JT (China) Du Y	21	21

==== Section 4 ====
First Round
(Hong Kong) Tam C H (Hong Kong) Ng T Y	21	21
(Indonesia) D Prawissa (Indonesia) A Rovita	7	10
(Thailand) P Kuna-Anuvit (Thailand) K Sudjaipraparat	11	13
8	(Indonesia) R Alexander (Indonesia) A Saufika	21	21
Q2	(Germany) J R Jansen (Germany) O Konon	21	21
(Indonesia) D Beno (Indonesia) S Putri	8	10
(Thailand) W Sarapat (Thailand) S Mingchua	16	16
2	(Singapore) Hee Y K (Singapore) Tan W H	21	21

Second Round
(Hong Kong) Tam C H (Hong Kong) Ng T Y	16	16
8	(Indonesia) R Alexander (Indonesia) A Saufika	21	21
Q2	(Germany) J R Jansen (Germany) O Konon	21	12	8
2	(Singapore) Hee Y K (Singapore) Tan W H	16	21	21

Quarterfinals
8	(Indonesia) R Alexander (Indonesia) A Saufika	21	14	19
2	(Singapore) Hee Y K (Singapore) Tan W H	14	21	21

Preceded by 2017 China Masters Grand Prix Gold	BWF Grand Prix Gold and Grand Prix; 2017 BWF Season	Succeeded by 2017 Chinese Taipei Open Grand Prix Gold
