= 2015 French Super Series =

Badminton championships

Tournament details
- Dates: 20 October 2015 – 25 October 2015
- Level: Super Series
- Total prize money: US$275,000
- Venue: Stade Pierre de Coubertin
- Location: Paris, France

Champions
- Men's singles: (Malaysia) Lee Chong Wei
- Women's singles: (Spain) Carolina Marín
- Men's doubles: (South Korea) Lee Yong-dae (South Korea) Yoo Yeon-seong
- Women's doubles: (China) Huang Yaqiong (China) Tang Jinhua
- Mixed doubles: (South Korea) Ko Sung-hyun (South Korea) Kim Ha-na

The 2015 French Super Series will be the tenth Super Series badminton tournament of the 2015 BWF Super Series. The tournament will be contested in Paris, France from October 20–25, 2015 and had a total purse of $275,000. A qualification will be held to fill four places in all five disciplines of the main draws.

== Men's singles ==
=== Seeds ===
1. (China) Chen Long (withdrawn)
2. (Denmark) Jan Ø. Jørgensen (semifinals)
3. (China) Lin Dan (first round)
4. (Japan) Kento Momota (second round)
5. (India) Srikanth Kidambi (first round)
6. (Chinese Taipei) Chou Tien-chen (final)
7. (Denmark) Viktor Axelsen (second round)
8. (India) Parupalli Kashyap (second round)
Qualification

=== Qualifying draw ===
==== Qualifier 1 ====
First Round
PFR	(France) L Claerbout	21	13	17
(France) T Rouxel	13	21	21
(Poland) A Dziolko	21	10	21
(Japan) K Tago	19	21	18

Second Round
(France) T Rouxel	21	21
(Poland) A Dziolko	17	16

==== Qualifier 2 ====
First Round
3	(South Korea) Lee D-k	P	M	D
(Ukraine) D Zavadsky
PFR	(Japan) K Nishimoto	21	21
(France) L Corvée	9	8

Second Round
(Ukraine) D Zavadsky	14	18
PFR	(Japan) K Nishimoto	21	21

==== Qualifier 3 ====
First Round
(Czech Republic) P Koukal	21	17	15
(Estonia) R Must	17	21	21
(Denmark) C L Thomsen	10	9
4	(Malaysia) Chong W F	21	21

Second Round
(Estonia) R Must	11	11
4	(Malaysia) Chong W F	21	21

==== Qualifier 4 ====
First Round
(Denmark) J Persson	18	22	21
(Indonesia) A K Tedjono	21	20	19
(Chinese Taipei) Wang T-w	21	21
2	(India) B S Praneeth	15	15

Second Round
(Denmark) J Persson	26	17	15
(Chinese Taipei) Wang T-w	24	21	21

=== Top half ===
First Round
PFQ	(South Korea) Lee D-k	21	14	21
(Indonesia) T Sugiarto	16	21	19
(Chinese Taipei) Hsu J-h	13	11
(China) Wang ZM	21	21
8	(India) K Parupalli	21	22
Q1	(France) T Rouxel	11	20
(Thailand) T Saensomboonsuk	6	12
(England) R Ouseph	21	21
4	(Japan) K Momota	21	21
(South Korea) Son W-h	15	17
(Japan) S Sasaki	21	21
Q3	(Malaysia) Chong W F	18	11
7	(Denmark) V Axelsen	21	16	21
(Hong Kong) Wei N	13	21	11
(Malaysia) Lee C W	21	21
(France) B Leverdez	7	15

Second Round
PFQ	(South Korea) Lee D-k	11	17
(China) Wang ZM	21	21
8	(India) K Parupalli	11	21	2^{r}
(England) R Ouseph	21	13	4
4	(Japan) K Momota	21	19	19
(Japan) S Sasaki	15	21	21
7	(Denmark) V Axelsen	21	17	14
(Malaysia) Lee C W	12	21	21

Quarterfinals
(China) Wang ZM	21	12	21
(England) R Ouseph	17	21	8
(Japan) S Sasaki	9	12
(Malaysia) Lee C W	21	21

Semifinals
(China) Wang ZM	7	13
(Malaysia) Lee C W	21	21

=== Bottom half ===
First Round
(Hong Kong) Wong W K	21	21
Q4	(Chinese Taipei) Wang T-w	14	15
(Indonesia) D H Rumbaka	25	14
6	(Chinese Taipei) Chou T-c	27	21
(Thailand) B Ponsana	9	21	11
(Hong Kong) Ng K L	21	14	21
(India) H. S. Prannoy	14	21	21
3	(China) Lin D	21	11	17
PFQ	(India) A Jayaram	21	18	21
(Denmark) H-K Vittinghus	18	21	18
(China) Tian HW	21	13	21
5	(India) K Srikanth	15	21	11
Q2	(Japan) K Nishimoto	21	21
(Japan) T Ueda	8	13
(Hong Kong) Hu Y	3	21	22
2	(Denmark) J Ø Jørgensen	21	17	24

Second Round
(Hong Kong) Wong W K	18	21	16
6	(Chinese Taipei) Chou T-c	21	13	21
(Hong Kong) Ng K L	21	21
(India) H. S. Prannoy	15	10
PFQ	(India) A Jayaram	18	8
(China) Tian HW	21	21
Q2	(Japan) K Nishimoto	14	21	20
2	(Denmark) J Ø Jørgensen	21	19	22

Quarterfinals
6	(Chinese Taipei) Chou T-c	21	15	21
(Hong Kong) Ng K L	13	21	10
(China) Tian HW	18	19
2	(Denmark) J Ø Jørgensen	21	21

Semifinals
6	(Chinese Taipei) Chou T-c	21	21
2	(Denmark) J Ø Jørgensen	11	19

=== Finals ===
Semifinals
(China) Wang Zhengming	7	13
(Malaysia) Lee Chong Wei	21	21
6	(Chinese Taipei) Chou Tien-chen	21	21
2	(Denmark) Jan Ø. Jørgensen	11	19

Final
(Malaysia) Lee Chong Wei	21	21
6	(Chinese Taipei) Chou Tien-chen	13	18

== Women's singles ==
=== Seeds ===
1. (India) Saina Nehwal (quarterfinals)
2. (Spain) Carolina Marín (champion)
3. (Chinese Taipei) Tai Tzu-ying (semifinals)
4. (China) Wang Shixian (final)
5. (China) Li Xuerui (quarterfinals)
6. (China) Wang Yihan (second round)
7. (South Korea) Sung Ji-hyun (first round)
8. (Thailand) Ratchanok Intanon (semifinals)
Qualification

=== Qualifying draw ===
==== Qualifier 1 ====
First Round
PFR	(France) K Normand	20	7
(Chinese Taipei) Chen H-h	22	21
(Thailand) N Jindapon	21	21
(Switzerland) S Jaquet	18	13

Second Round
(Chinese Taipei) Chen H-h	9	13
(Thailand) N Jindapon	21	21

==== Qualifier 2 ====
First Round
3	(United States) R Schafer	22	11
(Malaysia) Tee J Y	24	21
(France) D Lansac	21	17	21
(Denmark) A T Madsen	19	21	17

Second Round
(Malaysia) Tee J Y	21	21
(France) D Lansac	11	12

==== Qualifier 3 ====
First Round
(France) J Chaube	15	7
(Republic of Ireland) C Magee	21	21
(Denmark) L Kjaersfeldt	16	21
4	(Japan) K Imabeppu	21	23

Second Round
(Republic of Ireland) C Magee	14	5
4	(Japan) K Imabeppu	21	21

==== Qualifier 4 ====
First Round
PFR	(France) V Faulmann	18	13
(France) P Le Buhanic	21	21
(Germany) F Deprez	15	3^{r}
2	(Chinese Taipei) Hsu Y-c	21	14

Second Round
(France) P Le Buhanic	13	11
2	(Chinese Taipei) Hsu Y-c	21	21

=== Top half ===
First Round
1	(India) S Nehwal	21	21
(Canada) M Li	18	13
(Germany) K Schnaase	3^{r}
(Japan) M Mitani	2
8	(Thailand) R Intanon	21	21
Q4	(Chinese Taipei) Hsu Y-c	16	6
(Hong Kong) Cheung N Y	15	21	18
(Japan) S Sato	21	19	21
4	(China) Wang SX	21	21
(India) P. V. Sindhu	10	11
(Japan) A Yamaguchi	21	21	18
Q3	(Japan) K Imabeppu	10	23	21
6	(China) Wang YH	21	21
(Japan) Y Hashimoto	10	16
(China) Sun Y	11	18
(Japan) N Okuhara	21	21

Second Round
1	(India) S Nehwal	21	21
(Japan) M Mitani	19	16
8	(Thailand) R Intanon	21	21
(Japan) S Sato	15	13
4	(China) Wang SX	21	21
Q3	(Japan) K Imabeppu	16	19
6	(China) Wang YH	13	14
(Japan) N Okuhara	21	21

Quarterfinals
1	(India) S Nehwal	9	15
8	(Thailand) R Intanon	21	21
4	(China) Wang SX	21	27
(Japan) N Okuhara	17	25

Semifinals
8	(Thailand) R Intanon	13	21	19
4	(China) Wang SX	21	11	21

=== Bottom half ===
First Round
(Thailand) B Ongbumrungpan	14	21	14
(South Korea) Bae Y-j	21	16	21
(Indonesia) L Fanetri	14	14
5	(China) Li XR	21	21
Q1	(Thailand) N Jindapon	21	21
(Hong Kong) Yip P Y	17	10
(Thailand) P Buranaprasertsuk	14	18
3	(Chinese Taipei) Tai T-y	21	21
(Indonesia) M F Kusumastuti	19	21	21
(Spain) B Corrales	21	12	17
Q2	(Malaysia) Tee J Y	4
7	(South Korea) Sung J-h	2^{r}
PFQ	(Scotland) K Gilmour	21	19	21
(Chinese Taipei) Pai Y-p	10	21	16
(United States) I Wang	12	13
2	(Spain) C Marín	21	21

Second Round
(South Korea) Bae Y-j	15	14
5	(China) Li XR	21	21
Q1	(Thailand) N Jindapon	22	17	2
3	(Chinese Taipei) Tai T-y	20	21	21
(Indonesia) M F Kusumastuti	17	21	21
Q2	(Malaysia) Tee J Y	21	8	14
PFQ	(Scotland) K Gilmour	15	21	16
2	(Spain) C Marín	21	7	21

Quarterfinals
5	(China) Li XR	20	14
3	(Chinese Taipei) Tai T-y	22	21
(Indonesia) M F Kusumastuti	16	10
2	(Spain) C Marín	21	21

Semifinals
3	(Chinese Taipei) Tai T-y	17	17
2	(Spain) C Marín	21	21

=== Finals ===
Semifinals
8	(Thailand) Ratchanok Intanon	13	21	19
4	(China) Wang Shixian	21	11	21
3	(Chinese Taipei) Tai Tzu-ying	17	17
2	(Spain) Carolina Marín	21	21

Final
4	(China) Wang Shixian	18	10
2	(Spain) Carolina Marín	21	21

== Men's doubles ==
=== Seeds ===
1. (South Korea) Lee Yong-dae / Yoo Yeon-seong (champion)
2. (Indonesia) Mohammad Ahsan / Hendra Setiawan (semifinals)
3. (China) Fu Haifeng / Zhang Nan (quarterfinals)
4. (Denmark) Mathias Boe / Carsten Mogensen (quarterfinals)
5. (Japan) Hiroyuki Endo / Kenichi Hayakawa (quarterfinals)
6. (China) Chai Biao / Hong Wei (first round)
7. (China) Liu Xiaolong / Qiu Zihan (first round)
8. (Chinese Taipei) Lee Sheng-mu / Tsai Chia-hsin (first round)
Qualification

=== Qualifying draw ===
==== Qualifier 1 ====
First Round
PFR	(France) S Deslauriers (France) J Verin	10	8
(Chinese Taipei) Liao M-c (Chinese Taipei) Tseng M-h	21	21
(France) G Dunikowski (France) T Gicquel
(Malaysia) Hoon T H (Malaysia) Lim K W	w	/	o

Second Round
(Chinese Taipei) Liao M-c (Chinese Taipei) Tseng M-h	21	21
(France) G Dunikowski (France) T Gicquel	13	14

==== Qualifier 2 ====
First Round
4	(Belgium) M Dierickx (Belgium) F Golinski	10	11
(Thailand) B Issara (Thailand) N Puangpuapech	21	21
(Germany) R Beck (Germany) P Kaesbauer	21	21
(Hong Kong) Alan Chan Y L (Hong Kong) Reginald Lee C H	16	12

Second Round
(Thailand) B Issara (Thailand) N Puangpuapech	21	21
(Germany) R Beck (Germany) P Kaesbauer	16	11

==== Qualifier 3 ====
First Round
(Germany) M Lamsfuß (Germany) M E Seidel
Bye
(Chinese Taipei) Lin C-y (Chinese Taipei) Wu H-l	18	21	21
3	(Thailand) D Puavaranukroh (Thailand) K Kittinupong	21	14	17

Second Round
(Germany) M Lamsfuß (Germany) M E Seidel	18	22
(Chinese Taipei) Lin C-y (Chinese Taipei) Wu H-l	21	24

==== Qualifier 4 ====
First Round
(Malaysia) Lee J Y (Malaysia) Lim Z T	21	21
(France) J Corvee (France) J Maio	17	12
PFR	(France) S Lenik (France) M Perrin	13	10
2	(England) A Ellis (England) P Mills	21	21

Second Round
(Malaysia) Lee J Y (Malaysia) Lim Z T	18	15
2	(England) A Ellis (England) P Mills	21	21

=== Top half ===
First Round
1	(South Korea) Lee Y-d (South Korea) Yoo Y-s	15	21	21
(Russia) V Ivanov (Russia) I Sozonov	21	13	14
(Germany) M Schwenger (Germany) J Zurwonne	4^{r}
(Japan) H Hashimoto (Japan) N Hirata	8
5	(Japan) H Endo (Japan) K Hayakawa	21	21
(China) Li JH (China) Liu YC	13	15
PFQ	(Malaysia) Koo K K (Malaysia) Tan B H	21	21
Q4	(England) A Ellis (England) P Mills	16	17
3	(China) Fu HF (China) Zhang N	24	21
Q2	(Thailand) B Issara (Thailand) N Puangpuapech	22	16
Q1	(Chinese Taipei) Liao M-c (Chinese Taipei) Tseng M-h	21	21
(France) B Careme (France) R Labar	10	14
6	(China) Chai B (China) Hong W	16	21	12
(Malaysia) Goh V S (Malaysia) Tan W K	21	16	21
(Denmark) K Astrup (Denmark) A S Rasmussen	15	23	13
(South Korea) Kim G-j (South Korea) Kim S-r	21	21	21

Second Round
1	(South Korea) Lee Y-d (South Korea) Yoo Y-s	21	29	21
(Japan) H Hashimoto (Japan) N Hirata	9	30	14
5	(Japan) H Endo (Japan) K Hayakawa	14	21	21
PFQ	(Malaysia) Koo K K (Malaysia) Tan B H	21	19	16
3	(China) Fu HF (China) Zhang N	21	21
Q1	(Chinese Taipei) Liao M-c (Chinese Taipei) Tseng M-h	19	12
(Malaysia) Goh V S (Malaysia) Tan W K	11	18
(South Korea) Kim G-j (South Korea) Kim S-r	21	21

Quarterfinals
1	(South Korea) Lee Y-d (South Korea) Yoo Y-s	21	21
5	(Japan) H Endo (Japan) K Hayakawa	11	11
3	(China) Fu HF (China) Zhang N	21	21	20
(South Korea) Kim G-j (South Korea) Kim S-r	15	23	22

Semifinals
1	(South Korea) Lee Y-d (South Korea) Yoo Y-s	21	21
(South Korea) Kim G-j (South Korea) Kim S-r	18	18

=== Bottom half ===
First Round
(Denmark) M Conrad-Petersen (Denmark) M Pieler Kolding	21	21
(England) M Ellis (England) C Langridge	18	18
(Germany) M Fuchs (Germany) J Schöttler	21	18	21
8	(Chinese Taipei) Lee S-m (Chinese Taipei) Tsai C-h	19	21	18
(Poland) A Cwalina (Poland) P Wacha	12	15
(Indonesia) A Pratama (Indonesia) R K Suwardi	21	21
(China) Wang YL (China) Zhang W	28	17	12
4	(Denmark) M Boe (Denmark) C Mogensen	26	21	21
(Chinese Taipei) Chen H-l (Chinese Taipei) Wang C-l	21	21
(Japan) T Kamura (Japan) K Sonoda	19	18
(South Korea) Ko S-h (South Korea) Shin B-c	16	21	21
7	(China) Liu XL (China) Qiu ZH	21	12	18
(Japan) K Kazuno (Japan) K Yamada	21	20	23
Q3	(Chinese Taipei) Lin C-y (Chinese Taipei) Wu H-l	19	22	21
(China) Cai Y (China) Lu K	13	10
2	(Indonesia) M Ahsan (Indonesia) H Setiawan	21	21

Second Round
(Denmark) M Conrad-Petersen (Denmark) M Pieler Kolding	24	17	21
(Germany) M Fuchs (Germany) J Schöttler	22	21	19
(Indonesia) A Pratama (Indonesia) R K Suwardi	19	17
4	(Denmark) M Boe (Denmark) C Mogensen	21	21
(Chinese Taipei) Chen H-l (Chinese Taipei) Wang C-l	16	23	21
(South Korea) Ko S-h (South Korea) Shin B-c	21	21	17
(Japan) K Kazuno (Japan) K Yamada	11	16
2	(Indonesia) M Ahsan (Indonesia) H Setiawan	21	21

Quarterfinals
(Denmark) M Conrad-Petersen (Denmark) M Pieler Kolding	21	16	21
4	(Denmark) M Boe (Denmark) C Mogensen	16	21	13
(Chinese Taipei) Chen H-l (Chinese Taipei) Wang C-l	12	19
2	(Indonesia) M Ahsan (Indonesia) H Setiawan	21	21

Semifinals
(Denmark) M Conrad-Petersen (Denmark) M Pieler Kolding	21	19	21
2	(Indonesia) M Ahsan (Indonesia) H Setiawan	18	21	15

=== Finals ===
Semifinals
1	(South Korea) Lee Yong-dae (South Korea) Yoo Yeon-seong	21	21
(South Korea) Kim Gi-jung (South Korea) Kim Sa-rang	18	18
(Denmark) Mads Conrad-Petersen (Denmark) Mads Pieler Kolding	21	19	21
2	(Indonesia) Mohammad Ahsan (Indonesia) Hendra Setiawan	18	21	15

Final
1	(South Korea) Lee Yong-dae (South Korea) Yoo Yeon-seong	21	21
(Denmark) Mads Conrad-Petersen (Denmark) Mads Pieler Kolding	14	19

== Women's doubles ==
=== Seeds ===
1. (Japan) Misaki Matsutomo / Ayaka Takahashi (second round)
2. (China) Luo Ying / Luo Yu (final)
3. (Denmark) Christinna Pedersen / Kamilla Rytter Juhl (second round)
4. (Indonesia) Nitya Krishinda Maheswari / Greysia Polii (semifinals)
5. (China) Tian Qing / Zhao Yunlei (withdrawn)
6. (China) Ma Jin / Tang Yuanting (withdrawn)
7. (Japan) Reika Kakiiwa / Miyuki Maeda (first round)
8. (Netherlands) Eefje Muskens / Selena Piek (quarterfinals)
Qualification

=== Qualifying draw ===
==== Qualifier 1 ====
First Round
Bye
(Denmark) M Fruergaard (Denmark) S Thygesen
(France) P Fontaine (France) M Ligneau	8	16
(Germany) B Bellenberg (Germany) E Janssens	21	21

Second Round
(Denmark) M Fruergaard (Denmark) S Thygesen	21	21
(Germany) B Bellenberg (Germany) E Janssens	16	16

==== Qualifier 2 ====
First Round
4	(Chinese Taipei) Chiang K-h (Chinese Taipei) Wu F-c	7	12
(South Korea) Chang Y-n (South Korea) Lee S-h	21	21
(Germany) J Karnott (Germany) F Volkmann	15	9
(France) A Fontaine (France) A Tran	21	21

Second Round
(South Korea) Chang Y-n (South Korea) Lee S-h	21	21
(France) A Fontaine (France) A Tran	11	13

==== Qualifier 3 ====
First Round
(Germany) L Efler (Germany) L Kaepplein	19	21	14
(France) M Batomene (France) E Lefel	21	18	21
(France) L Baumann (France) D Delrue
3	(Thailand) C Chaladchalam (Thailand) P Muenwong	P	M	D

Second Round
(France) M Batomene (France) E Lefel	18	21	21
(France) L Baumann (France) D Delrue	21	19	10

==== Qualifier 4 ====
First Round
(South Korea) Jung K-e (South Korea) Shin S-c	21	21
(France) J Piron (France) A Saumier	7	5
(Indonesia) P Z Bernadeth (Indonesia) A P L Variella	21	21
PFR	(France) J Chaube (France) V Faulmann	14	11

Second Round
(South Korea) Jung K-e (South Korea) Shin S-c	21	21
(Indonesia) P Z Bernadeth (Indonesia) A P L Variella	7	12

=== Top half ===
First Round
1	(Japan) M Matsutomo (Japan) A Takahashi	21	21
(Germany) I Herttrich (Germany) B Michels	19	13
(China) Huang YQ (China) Tang JH	21	21
(Japan) N Fukuman (Japan) K Yonao	17	14
PFQ	(Thailand) C Chaladchalam (Thailand) P Muenwong	25	15	21
(United States) E Lee (United States) P L Obanana	23	21	14
(South Korea) Eom H-w (South Korea) Kim H-n	21	21
Q1	(Denmark) M Fruergaard (Denmark) S Thygesen	15	10
3	(Denmark) C Pedersen (Denmark) K Rytter Juhl	19	21	21
(Malaysia) Vivian Hoo K M (Malaysia) Woon K W	21	19	10
(Japan) A Kurihara (Japan) N Shinoya	10	17
Q4	(South Korea) Jung K-e (South Korea) Shin S-c	21	21
PFQ	(Chinese Taipei) Hsieh P-c (Chinese Taipei) Wu T-j	17	16
(Bulgaria) G Stoeva (Bulgaria) S Stoeva	21	21
PFQ	(Hong Kong) Poon L Y (Hong Kong) Tse Y S	13	15
(China) Bao YX (China) Zhong QX	21	21

Second Round
1	(Japan) M Matsutomo (Japan) A Takahashi	13	17
(China) Huang YQ (China) Tang JH	21	21
PFQ	(Thailand) C Chaladchalam (Thailand) P Muenwong	12	15
(South Korea) Eom H-w (South Korea) Kim H-n	21	21
3	(Denmark) C Pedersen (Denmark) K Rytter Juhl	17	18
Q4	(South Korea) Jung K-e (South Korea) Shin S-c	21	21
(Bulgaria) G Stoeva (Bulgaria) S Stoeva	21	19	21
(China) Bao YX (China) Zhong QX	17	21	12

Quarterfinals
(China) Huang YQ (China) Tang JH	21	21
(South Korea) Eom H-w (South Korea) Kim H-n	18	6
Q4	(South Korea) Jung K-e (South Korea) Shin S-c	17	21	21
(Bulgaria) G Stoeva (Bulgaria) S Stoeva	21	8	12

Semifinals
(China) Huang YQ (China) Tang JH	11	21	21
Q4	(South Korea) Jung K-e (South Korea) Shin S-c	21	18	10

=== Bottom half ===
First Round
(South Korea) Chae Y-j (South Korea) Kim S-y	21	21
(Malaysia) A A Anscelly (Malaysia) Soong F C	14	16
(South Korea) Go A-r (South Korea) Yoo H-w	22	21	21
7	(Japan) R Kakiiwa (Japan) M Maeda	24	8	15
Q2	(South Korea) Chang Y-n (South Korea) Lee S-h	21	21
(Chinese Taipei) Hsu Y-c (Chinese Taipei) Pai Y-p	11	11
(Japan) S Matsuo (Japan) M Naito	18	21	17
4	(Indonesia) N K Maheswari (Indonesia) G Polii	21	16	21
(India) J Gutta (India) A Ponnappa	21	21
(Thailand) J Kittiharakul (Thailand) R Prajongjai	15	12
Q3	(France) M Batomene (France) E Lefel	18	14
8	(Netherlands) E Muskens (Netherlands) S Piek	21	21
(Netherlands) S Barning (Netherlands) I Tabeling	15	21	18
(Germany) J Goliszewski (Germany) C Nelte	21	7	21
(Thailand) P Supajirakul (Thailand) S Taerattanachai	21	20	18
2	(China) Luo Y (China) Luo Y	19	22	21

Second Round
(South Korea) Chae Y-j (South Korea) Kim S-y	22	25
(South Korea) Go A-r (South Korea) Yoo H-w	20	23
Q2	(South Korea) Chang Y-n (South Korea) Lee S-h	21	18	19
4	(Indonesia) N K Maheswari (Indonesia) G Polii	9	21	21
(India) J Gutta (India) A Ponnappa	15	18
8	(Netherlands) E Muskens (Netherlands) S Piek	21	21
(Germany) J Goliszewski (Germany) C Nelte	14	10
2	(China) Luo Y (China) Luo Y	21	21

Quarterfinals
(South Korea) Chae Y-j (South Korea) Kim S-y	12	17
4	(Indonesia) N K Maheswari (Indonesia) G Polii	21	21
8	(Netherlands) E Muskens (Netherlands) S Piek
2	(China) Luo Y (China) Luo Y	w	/	o

Semifinals
4	(Indonesia) N K Maheswari (Indonesia) G Polii	19	14
2	(China) Luo Y (China) Luo Y	21	21

=== Finals ===
Semifinals
(China) Huang Yaqiong (China) Tang Jinhua	11	21	21
Q4	(South Korea) Jung Kyung-eun (South Korea) Shin Seung-chan	21	18	10
4	(Indonesia) Nitya Krishinda Maheswari (Indonesia) Greysia Polii	19	14
2	(China) Luo Ying (China) Luo Yu	21	21

Final
(China) Huang Yaqiong (China) Tang Jinhua	21	21
2	(China) Luo Ying (China) Luo Yu	13	16

== Mixed doubles ==
=== Seeds ===
1. (China) Zhang Nan / Zhao Yunlei (withdrawn)
2. (Indonesia) Tantowi Ahmad / Liliyana Natsir (first round)
3. (China) Xu Chen / Ma Jin (quarterfinals)
4. (China) Liu Cheng / Bao Yixin (quarterfinals)
5. (Denmark) Joachim Fischer Nielsen / Christinna Pedersen (second round)
6. (England) Chris Adcock / Gabrielle Adcock (semifinals)
7. (South Korea) Ko Sung-hyun / Kim Ha-na (champion)
8. (China) Lu Kai / Huang Yaqiong (semifinals)
Qualification

=== Qualifying draw ===
==== Qualifier 1 ====
First Round
PFR	(France) S Lenik (France) M Noblecourt	10	13
(Germany) M Lamsfuss (Germany) I Herttrich	21	21
(Germany) M E Seidel (Germany) L Efler	10	10
(South Korea) Yoo Y-s (South Korea) Chang Y-n	21	21

Second Round
(Germany) M Lamsfuss (Germany) I Herttrich	25	21
(South Korea) Yoo Y-s (South Korea) Chang Y-n	23	16

==== Qualifier 2 ====
First Round
PFR	(France) J Maio (France) L Baumann	19	19
(Chinese Taipei) Wu H-l (Chinese Taipei) Hsieh P-c	21	21
(France) B Kersaudy (France) L Palermo	15	8
(China) Liu YC (China) Tang JH	21	21

Second Round
(Chinese Taipei) Wu H-l (Chinese Taipei) Hsieh P-c	15	9
(China) Liu YC (China) Tang JH	21	21

==== Qualifier 3 ====
First Round
(Japan) K Kazuno (Japan) A Kurihara	21	21
(Germany) J Pistorius (Germany) E Janssens	9	15
(Thailand) B Issara (Thailand) S Amitrapai	21	21
PFR	(France) J Corvee (France) A Tran	13	12

Second Round
(Japan) K Kazuno (Japan) A Kurihara	21	22
(Thailand) B Issara (Thailand) S Amitrapai	11	20

==== Qualifier 4 ====
First Round
(Germany) P Kaesbauer (Germany) F Volkmann	21	13	14
(Chinese Taipei) Lin C-y (Chinese Taipei) Wu T-j	16	21	21
(England) M Nottingham (England) E Westwood	19	15
PFR	(France) T Vallez (France) D Delrue	21	21

Second Round
(Chinese Taipei) Lin C-y (Chinese Taipei) Wu T-j	P	M	D
PFR	(France) T Vallez (France) D Delrue

=== Top half ===
First Round
PFQ	(Chinese Taipei) Lin C-y (Chinese Taipei) Wu T-j	9	10
Q2	(China) Liu YC (China) Tang JH	21	21
(Germany) M Fuchs (Germany) B Michels	11	17
PFQ	(South Korea) Lee Y-d (South Korea) Lee S-h	21	21
8	(China) Lu K (China) Huang YQ	21	21
(Malaysia) Chan P S (Malaysia) Goh L Y	7	9
(South Korea) Shin B-c (South Korea) Chae Y-j	17	21	10
(Hong Kong) Lee C H (Hong Kong) Chau H W	21	15	21
3	(China) Xu C (China) Ma J	21	21
(Indonesia) E Subaktiar (Indonesia) G E Widjaja	10	15
(Republic of Ireland) S Magee (Republic of Ireland) C Magee	20	21	21
(Australia) R Middleton (Australia) L Choo	22	19	11
5	(Denmark) J Fischer Nielsen (Denmark) C Pedersen	21	21
(Hong Kong) Chan Y L (Hong Kong) Tse Y S	16	19
Q1	(Germany) M Lamsfuss (Germany) I Herttrich	19	15
(Indonesia) P Jordan (Indonesia) D Susanto	21	21

Second Round
Q2	(China) Liu YC (China) Tang JH	17	21	21
PFQ	(South Korea) Lee Y-d (South Korea) Lee S-h	21	8	18
8	(China) Lu K (China) Huang YQ	23	20	21
(Hong Kong) Lee C H (Hong Kong) Chau H W	21	22	17
3	(China) Xu C (China) Ma J	21	21
(Republic of Ireland) S Magee (Republic of Ireland) C Magee	14	10
5	(Denmark) J Fischer Nielsen (Denmark) C Pedersen	21	17	17
(Indonesia) P Jordan (Indonesia) D Susanto	16	21	21

Quarterfinals
Q2	(China) Liu YC (China) Tang JH	18	15
8	(China) Lu K (China) Huang YQ	21	21
3	(China) Xu C (China) Ma J	8	21	21
(Indonesia) P Jordan (Indonesia) D Susanto	21	19	23

Semifinals
8	(China) Lu K (China) Huang YQ	18	19
(Indonesia) P Jordan (Indonesia) D Susanto	21	21

=== Bottom half ===
First Round
Q3	(Japan) K Kazuno (Japan) A Kurihara	21	21
(Denmark) N Nohr (Denmark) S Thygesen	16	17
PFQ	(South Korea) Choi S-g (South Korea) Eom H-w	13	18
6	(England) C Adcock (England) G Adcock	21	21
(France) R Labar (France) E Lefel	22	19
(Japan) K Hayakawa (Japan) M Matsutomo	24	21
PFQ	(South Korea) Kim G-j (South Korea) Shin S-c	15	9
4	(China) Liu C (China) Bao YX	21	21
Q4	(France) T Vallez (France) D Delrue	16	16
(Russia) V Durkin (Russia) N Vislova	21	21
(Malaysia) Wong F Y (Malaysia) Chow M K	12	12
7	(South Korea) Ko S-h (South Korea) Kim H-n	21	21
(Chinese Taipei) Liao M-c (Chinese Taipei) Chen H-h	21	17	13
(Thailand) S Prapakamol (Thailand) S Thoungthongkam	19	21	21
(Japan) K Sonoda (Japan) N Fukuman	16	21	21
2	(Indonesia) T Ahmad (Indonesia) L Natsir	21	17	13

Second Round
Q3	(Japan) K Kazuno (Japan) A Kurihara	18	15
6	(England) C Adcock (England) G Adcock	21	21
(Japan) K Hayakawa (Japan) M Matsutomo	21	15	10
4	(China) Liu C (China) Bao YX	18	21	21
(Russia) V Durkin (Russia) N Vislova	17	21	4
7	(South Korea) Ko S-h (South Korea) Kim H-n	21	19	21
(Thailand) S Prapakamol (Thailand) S Thoungthongkam	15	16
(Japan) K Sonoda (Japan) N Fukuman	21	21

Quarterfinals
6	(England) C Adcock (England) G Adcock	21	12	10^{r}
4	(China) Liu C (China) Bao YX	18	21	3
7	(South Korea) Ko S-h (South Korea) Kim H-n	21	21
(Japan) K Sonoda (Japan) N Fukuman	18	13

Semifinals
6	(England) C Adcock (England) G Adcock	14	11
7	(South Korea) Ko S-h (South Korea) Kim H-n	21	21

=== Finals ===
Semifinals
8	(China) Lu Kai (China) Huang Yaqiong	18	19
(Indonesia) Praveen Jordan (Indonesia) Debby Susanto	21	21
6	(England) Chris Adcock (England) Gabrielle Adcock	14	11
7	(South Korea) Ko Sung-hyun (South Korea) Kim Ha-na	21	21

Final
(Indonesia) Praveen Jordan (Indonesia) Debby Susanto	10	21	19
7	(South Korea) Ko Sung-hyun (South Korea) Kim Ha-na	21	15	21

Preceded by 2014 French Super Series	French Open	Succeeded by 2016 French Super Series
Preceded by 2015 Denmark Super Series Premier	BWF Super Series; 2015 BWF Season	Succeeded by 2015 China Open Super Series Premier
