= Ririn Amelia =

Indonesian badminton player (born 1993)

Personal information
- Born: 24 December 1993 (age 32) Padang, West Sumatra, Indonesia
- Height: 1.65 m (5 ft 5 in)

Sport
- Country: Indonesia
- Sport: Badminton
- Handedness: Right

Women's & mixed doubles
- Highest ranking: 50 (WD with Anna Cheong 8 June 2017); 48 (XD with Lukhi Apri Nugroho 30 August 2017)
- BWF profile
Medal record
Women's badminton
Representing Indonesia
Asian Junior Championships
Gold medal – first place	2011 Lucknow	Mixed doubles
Bronze medal – third place	2011 Lucknow	Mixed team

Ririn Amelia (born 24 December 1993) is an Indonesian badminton player affiliated with Djarum club. She was the gold medalist at the 2011 Asian Junior Championships in the mixed doubles event with her partner Lukhi Apri Nugroho.

== Career ==
In September 2023, Ririn Amelia and her partner Marsheilla Gischa Islami lost at the first round of Indonesia Masters Super 100 I from Chinese Taipei pair Sung Yu-hsuan and Wang Szu-min in straight games.

== Achievements ==
=== Asian Junior Championships ===
Mixed doubles
Year	Venue	Partner	Opponent	Score	Result
2011	Babu Banarasi Das Indoor Stadium Lucknow, India	(Indonesia) Lukhi Apri Nugroho	(China) Pei Tianyi (China) Ou Dongni	15–21, 21–16, 25–23	Gold

=== BWF International Challenge/Series (2 titles, 6 runners-up) ===
Women's doubles
Year	Tournament	Partner	Opponent	Score	Result
2012	Malaysia International	(Indonesia) Melvira Oklamona	(Malaysia) Chow Mei Kuan (Malaysia) Lee Meng Yean	13–21, 21–23	(silver) Runner-up
2014	Bulgarian International	(Indonesia) Komala Dewi	(Indonesia) Della Destiara Haris (Indonesia) Gebby Ristiyani Imawan	9–21, 21–18, 18–21	(silver) Runner-up
2017	Lao International	(Malaysia) Anna Cheong	(Thailand) Kittipak Dubthuk (Thailand) Natcha Saengchote	11–21, 17–21	(silver) Runner-up
2022	Indonesia International	(Indonesia) Virni Putri	(Indonesia) Ridya Aulia Fatasya (Indonesia) Kelly Larissa	18–21, 21–13, 21–18	(gold) Winner

Mixed doubles
Year	Tournament	Partner	Opponent	Score	Result
2017	Smiling Fish International	(Indonesia) Lukhi Apri Nugroho	(China) Wang Sijie (China) Du Peng	14–21, 12–21	(silver) Runner-up
2017	Indonesia International	(Indonesia) Lukhi Apri Nugroho	(China) Ou Xuanyi (China) Liu Lin	20–22, 11–21	(silver) Runner-up
2017	Lao International	(Indonesia) Lukhi Apri Nugroho	(Thailand) Parinyawat Thongnuam (Thailand) Kittipak Dubthuk	21–17, 13–21, 21–13	(gold) Winner
2019	Nepal International	(Thailand) Phutthaporn Bowornwatanuwong	(India) Venkat Gaurav Prasad (India) Juhi Dewangan	19–21, 10–17 Retired	(silver) Runner-up

BWF International Challenge tournament
BWF International Series tournament
BWF Future Series tournament

== Performance timeline ==
Key

W	Won	F	Finalist	SF	Semi-finalist
QF	Quarter-finalist	#R	Rounds 4, 3, 2, 1	RR	Round-robin stage
Q#	Qualification round	A	Absent	w/d	Withdrew
G	Gold	S	Silver	B	Bronze
NH	Not held	N/A	Not applicable	DNQ	Did not qualify

=== Indonesian team ===
- Junior level

Team event	2011
Asian Junior Championships	B

=== Individual competitions ===
==== Junior level ====
Girls' doubles

Events	2011
Asian Junior Championships	1R
World Junior Championships	2R

Mixed doubles

Events	2011
Asian Junior Championships	G
World Junior Championships	3R

==== Senior level ====
===== Women's doubles =====
Event	2017
World Championships	1R

Tournament	BWF Superseries / Grand Prix								BWF World Tour						Best	Ref
Tournament	2010	2011	2012	2013	2014	2015	2016	2017	2018	2019	2020	2021	2022	2023	Best	Ref
Malaysia Open	A							Q1	A		NH		A		Q1 ('17)	
Indonesia Masters	2R	2R	1R	2R	QF	1R	QF	NH	A	Q2	A		1R	A	QF ('14, '16)	
Malaysia Masters	A							2R	A			NH	A		2R ('17)	
Thailand Open	NH	A			NH	A	2R	2R	A			NH	A		2R ('16, '17)	
Indonesia Open	A	2R	1R	1R	Q1	Q1	A	Q1	A		NH	A			2R ('11)	
Indonesia Masters Super 100	NA								2R	A	NH		A	1R	2R ('18)	
Vietnam Open	A				2R	A					NH		A		2R ('14)	
Syed Modi International	A		2R	NH	A						NH		A		2R ('12)	
Dutch Open	A				2R	A					NH	NA			2R ('14)	
Year-end ranking	200	107	117	164	82	238	77	55	248	534	515	694	149		50	

===== Mixed doubles =====
Event	2017
World Championships	2R

Tournament	BWF Superseries / Grand Prix								BWF World Tour	Best
Tournament	2010	2011	2012	2013	2014	2015	2016	2017	2018	Best
Thailand Open	NH	A			NH	A	1R	2R	A	2R ('17)
Indonesia Masters	1R	1R	A		w/d	1R	QF	NH	1R	QF ('16)
Indonesia Open	A							Q2	A	Q2 ('17)
Malaysia Open	A							Q2	A	Q2 ('17)
Malaysia Masters	A							1R	A	1R ('17)
Singapore Open	A							Q2	A	Q2 ('17)
Vietnam Open	A				1R	A				1R ('14)
Year-end ranking	228	221			317	175	82	54	324	48
