= Lukhi Apri Nugroho =

Indonesian badminton player (born 1993)

Personal information
- Born: 20 April 1993 (age 33) Sukoharjo, Central Java, Indonesia
- Height: 1.71 m (5 ft 7 in)
- Weight: 61 kg (134 lb)

Sport
- Country: Indonesia
- Sport: Badminton
- Handedness: Right

Men's & mixed doubles
- Highest ranking: 24 (XD with Annisa Saufika)
- Current ranking: 964 (MD with A P Rahmanto Putra 16 February 2021); 768 (XD with Brigita Marcelia Rumambi 16 February 2021)
- BWF profile
Medal record
Men's badminton
Representing Indonesia
Asian Junior Championships
Gold medal – first place	2011 Lucknow	Mixed doubles
Bronze medal – third place	2011 Lucknow	Mixed team

Lukhi Apri Nugroho (born 20 April 1993) is an Indonesian badminton player. He is a doubles specialist from PB. Djarum, and has joined the club since 2010. Nogroho won the mixed doubles title at the 2011 Asian Junior Championships when he was partnered with Ririn Amelia.

== Achievements ==
=== Asian Junior Championships ===
Mixed doubles
Year	Venue	Partner	Opponent	Score	Result
2011	Babu Banarasi Das Indoor Stadium; Lucknow, India	(Indonesia) Ririn Amelia	(China) Pei Tianyi (China) Ou Dongni	15–21, 21–16, 25–23	Gold

=== BWF International Challenge/Series (4 titles, 4 runners-up) ===
Men's doubles
Year	Tournament	Partner	Opponent	Score	Result
2011	Singapore International	(Indonesia) Kevin Sanjaya Sukamuljo	(Indonesia) Marcus Fernaldi Gideon (Indonesia) Agripinna Prima Rahmanto Putra	17–21, 9–21	(silver) Runner-up
2017	Lao International	(Malaysia) Muhammad Syawal Mohd Ismail	(Malaysia) Lee Jian Yi (Malaysia) Lim Zhen Ting	17–21, 21–10, 21–14	(gold) Winner

Mixed doubles
Year	Tournament	Partner	Opponent	Score	Result
2012	Malaysia International	(Indonesia) Annisa Saufika	(Malaysia) Ong Jian Guo (Malaysia) Woon Khe Wei	11–21, 14–21	(silver) Runner-up
2013	Osaka International	(Indonesia) Annisa Saufika	(Chinese Taipei) Lin Chia-yu (Chinese Taipei) Wang Pei-rong	21–16, 21–19	(gold) Winner
2014	USM Indonesia International	(Indonesia) Masita Mahmudin	(Indonesia) Hafiz Faizal (Indonesia) Shella Devi Aulia	23–21, 18–21, 21–14	(gold) Winner
2017	Smiling Fish International	(Indonesia) Ririn Amelia	(China) Wang Sijie (China) Du Peng	14–21, 12–21	(silver) Runner-up
2017	Indonesia International	(Indonesia) Ririn Amelia	(China) Ou Xuanyi (China) Liu Lin	20–22, 11–21	(silver) Runner-up
2017	Lao International	(Indonesia) Ririn Amelia	(Thailand) Parinyawat Thongnuam (Thailand) Kittipak Dubthuk	21–17, 13–21, 21–13	(gold) Winner

BWF International Challenge tournament
BWF International Series tournament

== Performance timeline ==
Key

W	Won	F	Finalist	SF	Semi-finalist
QF	Quarter-finalist	#R	Rounds 4, 3, 2, 1	RR	Round-robin stage
Q#	Qualification round	A	Absent	w/d	Withdrew
G	Gold	S	Silver	B	Bronze
NH	Not held	N/A	Not applicable	DNQ	Did not qualify

=== National team ===
- Junior level

Team event	2011
Asian Junior Championships	B

=== Individual competitions ===
- Junior level

Event	2011
Asian Junior Championships	G

- Senior level

Event	2017
World Championships	2R

Tournament	2018	Best
BWF World Tour
Indonesia Masters	1R	QF (2013, 2014, 2016)

Tournament	2010	2011	2012	2013	2014	2015	2016	2017	Best
BWF Grand Prix and Grand Prix Gold
Indonesia Masters	1R (MD); 1R (XD)	1R	2R	QF (XD)	2R (MD); QF (XD)	2R	QF	—N/a	QF (2013, 2014, 2016)
