= Goh Soon Huat =

Malaysian badminton player (born 1990)

Goh Soon Huat 吴埙阀
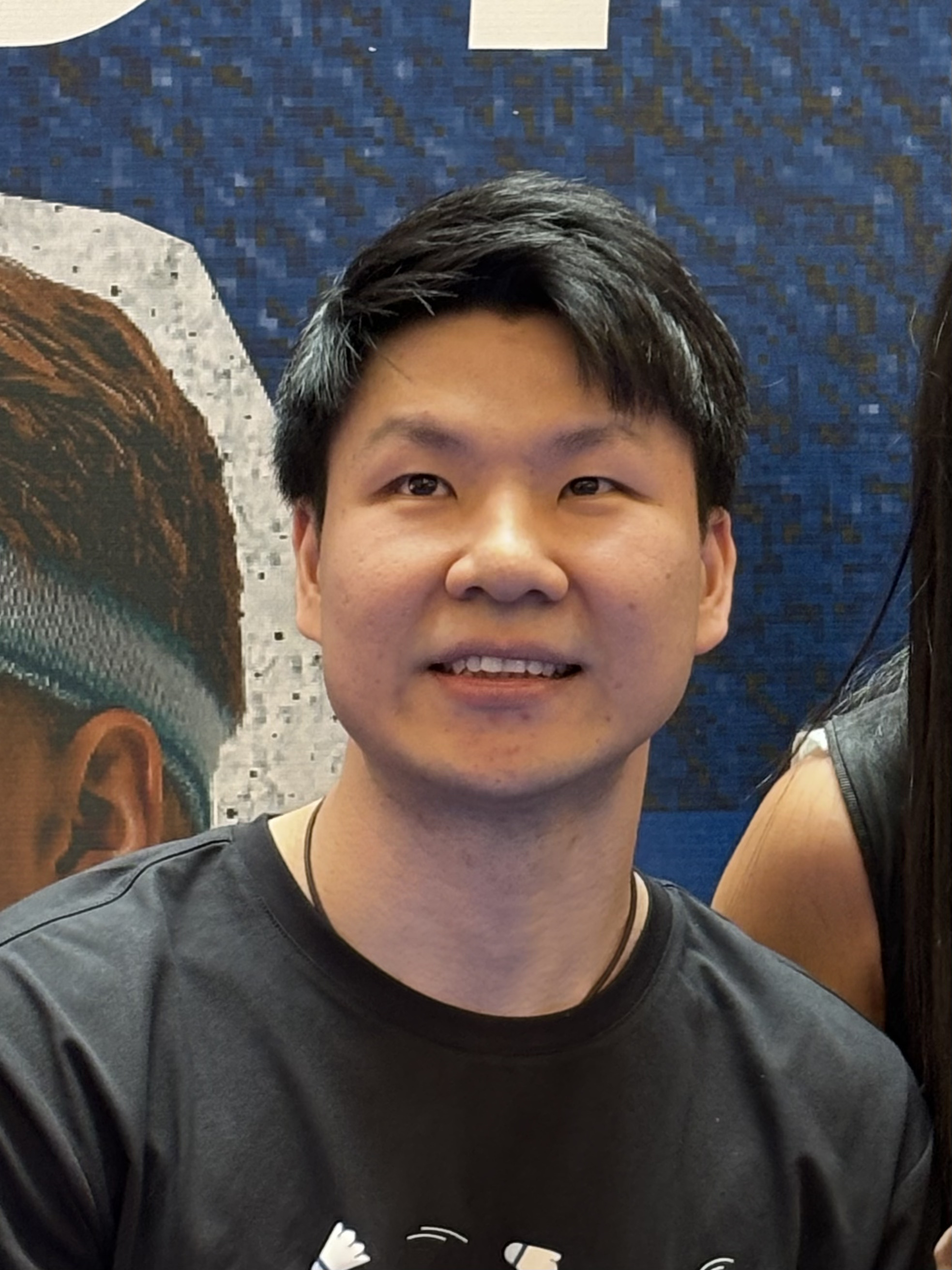
- Goh in 2025

Personal information
- Born: 27 June 1990 (age 36) Malacca, Malaysia
- Years active: 2009–present
- Height: 1.79 m (5 ft 10 in)
- Weight: 65 kg (143 lb)
- Spouse: Shevon Jemie Lai (m. 2024)

Sport
- Country: Malaysia
- Sport: Badminton
- Handedness: Right
- Coached by: Ameer Zainuddin

Mixed doubles
- Highest ranking: 3 (XD with Shevon Jemie Lai, 18 February 2025)
- Current ranking: 12 (XD with Shevon Jemie Lai, 17 November 2026)
- BWF profile
Medal record
Men's badminton
Representing Malaysia
Sudirman Cup
Bronze medal – third place	2023 Suzhou	Mixed team
Thomas Cup
Silver medal – second place	2014 New Delhi	Men's team
Bronze medal – third place	2016 Kunshan	Men's team
Commonwealth Games
Silver medal – second place	2018 Gold Coast	Mixed team
Asian Games
Bronze medal – third place	2014 Incheon	Men's team
Asian Championships
Bronze medal – third place	2023 Dubai	Mixed doubles
SEA Games
Silver medal – second place	2011 Jakarta–Palembang	Men's team
Silver medal – second place	2017 Kuala Lumpur	Men's team
Silver medal – second place	2017 Kuala Lumpur	Mixed doubles
Silver medal – second place	2019 Philippines	Men's team
Silver medal – second place	2019 Philippines	Mixed doubles
World Junior Championships
Bronze medal – third place	2008 Pune	Mixed team

Goh Soon Huat (simplified Chinese: 吴埙阀; traditional Chinese: 吳塤閥; pinyin: Wú Xūnfá, born 27 June 1990) is a Malaysian badminton player who specialises in mixed doubles and previously men's singles. An Asian championship bronze medalist, Sudirman Cup bronze medalist and two-time SEA Games mixed doubles silver medalist, he and his partner Shevon Jemie Lai won a bronze medal at the 2023 Asian Championships and silver medals in mixed doubles at the 2017 and 2019 SEA Games. Together, they achieved a career-high world ranking of number three on 18 February 2025.

Goh and Lai won four BWF World Tour mixed doubles titles, including the 2018 German Open, 2018 Singapore Open, 2024 Swiss Open and 2024 Malaysia Masters. At the 2018 Singapore Open, they defeated Indonesia's reigning Olympic champions Tontowi Ahmad and Liliyana Natsir in the final, securing their first BWF World Tour Super 500 title. Their 2024 Swiss Open victory made them the first Malaysian mixed doubles pair to win the title at the tournament, while their triumph at the 2024 Malaysia Masters marked their second Super 500 title. They subsequently reached their first BWF World Tour Super 1000 final at the 2024 China Open, finishing runners-up to China's Feng Yanzhe and Huang Dongping.

In team competitions, Goh was part of the Malaysian men's teams that won silver at the 2014 Thomas Cup and bronze at the 2016 Thomas Cup, as well as bronze at the 2014 Asian Games. He also contributed to Malaysia's mixed team silver medal at the 2018 Commonwealth Games and bronze medal at the 2023 Sudirman Cup. Originally a men's singles player, he switched to mixed doubles and formed a partnership with Lai in 2016. The pair married on 4 May 2024, becoming one of Malaysia's married badminton partnerships competing at the international level.

== Personal life ==
On 29 December 2022, Goh and Lai announced their engagement after dating each other for more than two years. They were married on 4 May 2024.

== Career ==
=== 2023 ===
Goh and Lai best achievement in 2023 were the finalist in the Swiss Open, and also winning a bronze medal in the Asian Championships.

=== 2024 ===
In the first semester of 2024, Goh and his partner Shevon Jemie Lai won two BWF World Tour title in the Swiss Open and Malaysia Masters. In September, they reached their first ever BWF World Tour Super 1000 final in the China Open. However, they lost to home pair, world number 3 Feng Yanzhe and Huang Dongping in a close rubber games.

== Achievements ==
=== Asian Championships ===
Mixed doubles
Year	Venue	Partner	Opponent	Score	Result
2023	Sheikh Rashid Bin Hamdan Indoor Hall; Dubai, United Arab Emirates	(Malaysia) Shevon Jemie Lai	(China) Zheng Siwei (China) Huang Yaqiong	11–21, 13–21	Bronze

=== SEA Games ===
Mixed doubles
Year	Venue	Partner	Opponent	Score	Result
2017	Axiata Arena; Kuala Lumpur, Malaysia	(Malaysia) Shevon Jemie Lai	(Thailand) Dechapol Puavaranukroh (Thailand) Sapsiree Taerattanachai	15–21, 20–22	Silver
2019	Muntinlupa Sports Complex; Metro Manila, Philippines	(Malaysia) Shevon Jemie Lai	(Indonesia) Praveen Jordan (Indonesia) Melati Daeva Oktavianti	19–21, 21–19, 21–23	Silver

=== BWF World Tour (4 titles, 4 runners-up) ===
The BWF World Tour, which was announced on 19 March 2017 and implemented in 2018, is a series of elite badminton tournaments sanctioned by the Badminton World Federation (BWF). The BWF World Tour is divided into levels of World Tour Finals, Super 1000, Super 750, Super 500, Super 300, and the BWF Tour Super 100.

Mixed doubles
Year	Tournament	Level	Partner	Opponent	Score	Result
2018	German Open	Super 300	(Malaysia) Shevon Jemie Lai	(Denmark) Niclas Nøhr (Denmark) Sara Thygesen	21–14, 22–20	(gold) Winner
2018	Singapore Open	Super 500	(Malaysia) Shevon Jemie Lai	(Indonesia) Tontowi Ahmad (Indonesia) Liliyana Natsir	21–19, 21–18	(gold) Winner
2019	Korea Masters	Super 300	(Malaysia) Shevon Jemie Lai	(Hong Kong) Tang Chun Man (Hong Kong) Tse Ying Suet	14–21, 15–21	(silver) Runner-up
2022	Swiss Open	Super 300	(Malaysia) Shevon Jemie Lai	(Germany) Mark Lamsfuß (Germany) Isabel Lohau	21–12, 18–21, 17–21	(silver) Runner-up
2023	Swiss Open	Super 300	(Malaysia) Shevon Jemie Lai	(China) Jiang Zhenbang (China) Wei Yaxin	17–21, 21–19, 17–21	(silver) Runner-up
2024	Swiss Open	Super 300	(Malaysia) Shevon Jemie Lai	(Malaysia) Chen Tang Jie (Malaysia) Toh Ee Wei	21–16, 21–13	(gold) Winner
2024	Malaysia Masters	Super 500	(Malaysia) Shevon Jemie Lai	(Indonesia) Rinov Rivaldy (Indonesia) Pitha Haningtyas Mentari	21–18, 21–19	(gold) Winner
2024	China Open	Super 1000	(Malaysia) Shevon Jemie Lai	(China) Feng Yanzhe (China) Huang Dongping	21–17, 14–21, 17–21	(silver) Runner-up

=== BWF Grand Prix (1 title, 3 runners-up) ===
The BWF Grand Prix had two levels, the Grand Prix and Grand Prix Gold. It was a series of badminton tournaments sanctioned by the Badminton World Federation (BWF) and played between 2007 and 2017.

Men's singles
Year	Tournament	Opponent	Score	Result
2013	Malaysia Grand Prix Gold	(Indonesia) Alamsyah Yunus	21–10, 9–21, 19–21	(silver) Runner-up

Mixed doubles
Year	Tournament	Partner	Opponent	Score	Result
2016	Scottish Open	(Malaysia) Shevon Jemie Lai	(India) Pranaav Jerry Chopra (India) N. Sikki Reddy	13–21, 21–18, 21–16	(gold) Winner
2017	Malaysia Masters	(Malaysia) Shevon Jemie Lai	(Malaysia) Tan Kian Meng (Malaysia) Lai Pei Jing	17–21, 9–21	(silver) Runner-up
2017	Thailand Open	(Malaysia) Shevon Jemie Lai	(China) He Jiting (China) Du Yue	13–21, 21–16, 12–21	(silver) Runner-up

BWF Grand Prix Gold tournament
BWF Grand Prix tournament

=== BWF International Challenge/Series (1 title, 1 runner-up) ===
Mixed doubles
Year	Tournament	Partner	Opponent	Score	Result
2016	Malaysia International	(Malaysia) Shevon Jemie Lai	(Chinese Taipei) Yang Po-hsuan (Chinese Taipei) Wen Hao-yun	21–13, 21–17	(gold) Winner
2016	Welsh International	(Malaysia) Shevon Jemie Lai	(Poland) Robert Mateusiak (Poland) Nadieżda Zięba	16–21, 21–11, 18–21	(silver) Runner-up

BWF International Challenge tournament
BWF International Series tournament
