= Shevon Jemie Lai =

Malaysian badminton player (born 1993)

Shevon Jemie Lai 赖洁敏
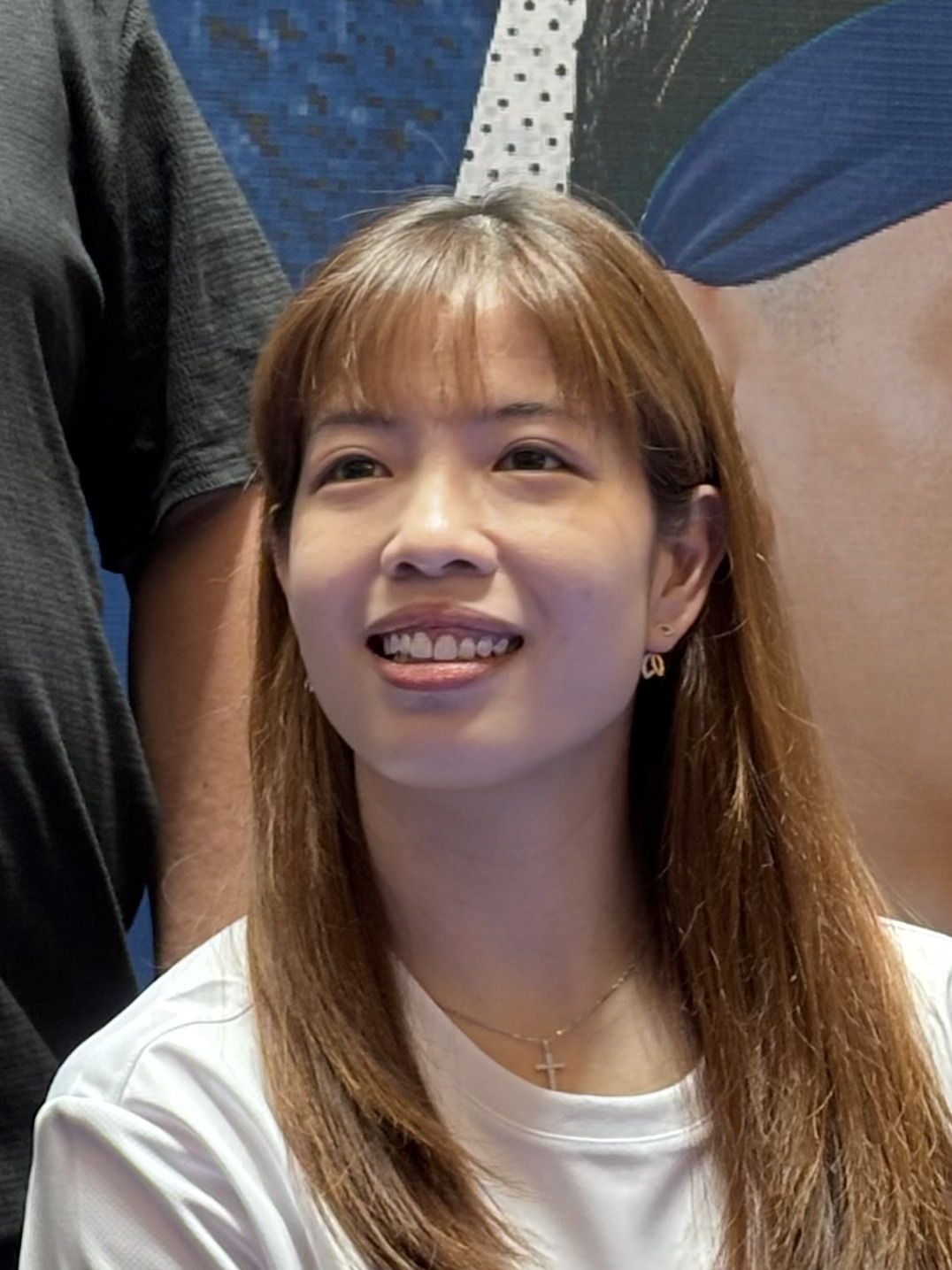
- Lai at the 2017 SEA Games

Personal information
- Born: 8 August 1993 (age 33) Selangor, Malaysia
- Height: 1.69 m (5 ft 7 in)
- Weight: 60 kg (132 lb)
- Spouse: Goh Soon Huat (m. 2024)

Sport
- Country: Malaysia
- Sport: Badminton
- Handedness: Left
- Coached by: Ameer Zainuddin

Women's & mixed doubles
- Highest ranking: 86 (WD with Marylen Ng, 6 June 2013); 3 (XD with Goh Soon Huat, 18 February 2025)
- Current ranking: 12 (XD with Goh Soon Huat, 17 November 2026)
- BWF profile
Medal record
Women's badminton
Representing Malaysia
Sudirman Cup
Bronze medal – third place	2023 Suzhou	Mixed team
Commonwealth Games
Silver medal – second place	2018 Gold Coast	Mixed team
Asian Championships
Bronze medal – third place	2023 Dubai	Mixed doubles
SEA Games
Silver medal – second place	2017 Kuala Lumpur	Mixed doubles
Silver medal – second place	2017 Kuala Lumpur	Women's team
Silver medal – second place	2019 Philippines	Mixed doubles
Bronze medal – third place	2019 Philippines	Women's team
World Junior Championships
Gold medal – first place	2011 Taipei	Mixed team
Silver medal – second place	2009 Alor Setar	Mixed team
Bronze medal – third place	2010 Guadalajara	Mixed team
Asian Junior Championships
Gold medal – first place	2009 Kuala Lumpur	Mixed team
Silver medal – second place	2010 Kuala Lumpur	Mixed team
Silver medal – second place	2011 Lucknow	Mixed team

Shevon Jemie Lai (simplified Chinese: 赖洁敏; traditional Chinese: 賴潔敏; pinyin: Lài Jiémǐn, born 8 August 1993) is a Malaysian badminton player. An Asian championship bronze medalist, world junior team champion, Sudirman Cup bronze medalist and two-time SEA Games silver medalist, she and her partner Goh Soon Huat won bronze at the 2023 Asian Championships and silver medals in mixed doubles at the 2017 and 2019 SEA Games. Together, they achieved a career-high world ranking of number three on 18 February 2025.

Lai and Goh won four BWF World Tour mixed doubles titles, including the 2018 German Open, 2018 Singapore Open, 2024 Swiss Open and 2024 Malaysia Masters. Their victory at the 2018 Singapore Open came against Indonesia's reigning Olympic champions Tontowi Ahmad and Liliyana Natsir, marking their first Super 500 title. In 2024, they captured the Swiss Open and Malaysia Masters titles before finishing runners-up at the 2024 China Open, their first BWF World Tour Super 1000 final.

In team competitions, Lai won a gold medal at the 2011 BWF World Junior Championships in the mixed team event, following silver and bronze medals at the 2009 and 2010 World Junior Championships. She was also part of Malaysia's gold-medal-winning mixed team at the 2009 Badminton Asia Junior Championships, silver-medal-winning mixed team at the 2018 Commonwealth Games and bronze-medal-winning mixed team at the 2023 Sudirman Cup. At the SEA Games, she additionally won a silver medal in the women's team event in 2017 and a bronze medal in 2019. Lai and Goh, who have competed together in mixed doubles since 2016, married on 4 May 2024.

== Career ==
Lai started playing badminton at her primary school SJKC Kuen Cheng 2, then in 2011 she joined the Malaysia national badminton team. She competed at the BWF World Junior Championships in the mixed team event and won a silver medal in 2009, a bronze medal in 2010, and a gold medal in 2011. In 2012, she became the champion of the Smiling Fish International tournament in the mixed doubles event partnered with Wong Fai Yin. She also became the semi-finalist of the Malaysia International tournament in women's doubles event partnered with Marylen Ng and at the Singapore International tournament in mixed's doubles event partnered with Ong Jian Guo. In 2013, she represented Kolej Komuniti Kuala Langat competed at the Summer Universiade in Kazan, Russia.

In 2014, Lai became the semi-finalist of the Singapore International Series and Malaysia International Challenge tournaments in mixed doubles event partnered with Tan Chee Tean. In September 2014, she became the runner-up of the Vietnam International Series tournament defeated by the Đào Mạnh Thắng and Phạm Như Thảo of Vietnam with the score 21–14, 21–11. In December 2014, she became the champion of the Bangladesh International tournament in mixed doubles event after defeat her compatriot Tan Wee Gieen and Peck Yen Wei with the score 21–17, 21–18.

In 2015, Lai became the runner-up of the Granular-Thailand International Challenge tournament in mixed doubles event after defeated by Choi Sol-gyu and former World Junior Champion Chae Yoo-jung of South Korea with the score 18–21, 21–19, 21–12. In November, she became the runner-up in mixed doubles event partnered with Tan Wee Gieen and semi-finalist in women's doubles event partnered with Peck Yen Wei at the Bangladesh International tournament.

In 2016, Lai won the Romanian International tournament in mixed doubles event partnered with Wong Fai Yin, after edging their teammates Ong Yew Sin and Peck Yen Wei with the score 21–15, 21–17. She also became the runner-up of Smiling Fish International tournament in mixed doubles.

In November 2016, Lai was paired with Goh Soon Huat a former men's singles player, and they will compete at the Malaysia International Challenge tournament.

== Personal life ==
On 29 December 2022, Goh and Lai announced their engagement after dating each other for more than two years. They were married on 4 May 2024.

== Achievements ==
=== Asian Championships ===
Mixed doubles
Year	Venue	Partner	Opponent	Score	Result
2023	Sheikh Rashid Bin Hamdan Indoor Hall, Dubai, United Arab Emirates	(Malaysia) Goh Soon Huat	(China) Zheng Siwei (China) Huang Yaqiong	11–21, 13–21	Bronze

=== SEA Games ===
Mixed doubles
Year	Venue	Partner	Opponent	Score	Result
2017	Axiata Arena; Kuala Lumpur, Malaysia	(Malaysia) Goh Soon Huat	(Thailand) Dechapol Puavaranukroh (Thailand) Sapsiree Taerattanachai	15–21, 20–22	Silver
2019	Muntinlupa Sports Complex; Metro Manila, Philippines	(Malaysia) Goh Soon Huat	(Indonesia) Praveen Jordan (Indonesia) Melati Daeva Oktavianti	19–21, 21–19, 21–23	Silver

=== BWF World Tour (4 titles, 4 runners-up) ===
The BWF World Tour, which was announced on 19 March 2017 and implemented in 2018, is a series of elite badminton tournaments sanctioned by the Badminton World Federation (BWF). The BWF World Tour is divided into levels of World Tour Finals, Super 1000, Super 750, Super 500, Super 300, and the BWF Tour Super 100.

Mixed doubles
Year	Tournament	Level	Partner	Opponent	Score	Result
2018	German Open	Super 300	(Malaysia) Goh Soon Huat	(Denmark) Niclas Nøhr (Denmark) Sara Thygesen	21–14, 22–20	(gold) Winner
2018	Singapore Open	Super 500	(Malaysia) Goh Soon Huat	(Indonesia) Tontowi Ahmad (Indonesia) Liliyana Natsir	21–19, 21–18	(gold) Winner
2019	Korea Masters	Super 300	(Malaysia) Goh Soon Huat	(Hong Kong) Tang Chun Man (Hong Kong) Tse Ying Suet	14–21, 15–21	(silver) Runner-up
2022	Swiss Open	Super 300	(Malaysia) Goh Soon Huat	(Germany) Mark Lamsfuß (Germany) Isabel Lohau	21–12, 18–21, 17–21	(silver) Runner-up
2023	Swiss Open	Super 300	(Malaysia) Goh Soon Huat	(China) Jiang Zhenbang (China) Wei Yaxin	17–21, 21–19, 17–21	(silver) Runner-up
2024	Swiss Open	Super 300	(Malaysia) Goh Soon Huat	(Malaysia) Chen Tang Jie (Malaysia) Toh Ee Wei	21–16, 21–13	(gold) Winner
2024	Malaysia Masters	Super 500	(Malaysia) Goh Soon Huat	(Indonesia) Rinov Rivaldy (Indonesia) Pitha Haningtyas Mentari	21–18, 21–19	(gold) Winner
2024	China Open	Super 1000	(Malaysia) Goh Soon Huat	(China) Feng Yanzhe (China) Huang Dongping	21–17, 14–21, 17–21	(silver) Runner-up

=== BWF Grand Prix (1 title, 2 runners-up) ===
The BWF Grand Prix had two levels, the Grand Prix and Grand Prix Gold. It was a series of badminton tournaments sanctioned by the Badminton World Federation (BWF) and played between 2007 and 2017.

Mixed doubles
Year	Tournament	Partner	Opponent	Score	Result
2016	Scottish Open	(Malaysia) Goh Soon Huat	(India) Pranaav Jerry Chopra (India) N. Sikki Reddy	13–21, 21–18, 21–16	(gold) Winner
2017	Malaysia Masters	(Malaysia) Goh Soon Huat	(Malaysia) Tan Kian Meng (Malaysia) Lai Pei Jing	17–21, 9–21	(silver) Runner-up
2017	Thailand Open	(Malaysia) Goh Soon Huat	(China) He Jiting (China) Du Yue	13–21, 21–16, 12–21	(silver) Runner-up

BWF Grand Prix Gold tournament
BWF Grand Prix tournament

=== BWF International Challenge / Series (4 titles, 5 runners-up) ===
Mixed doubles
Year	Tournament	Partner	Opponent	Score	Result
2012	Smiling Fish International	(Malaysia) Wong Fai Yin	(Malaysia) Tan Wee Gieen (Malaysia) Chow Mei Kuan	21–13, 23–21	(gold) Winner
2014	Vietnam International Series	(Malaysia) Tan Chee Tean	(Vietnam) Đào Mạnh Thắng (Vietnam) Phạm Như Thảo	14–21, 11–21	(silver) Runner-up
2014	Bangladesh International	(Malaysia) Tan Chee Tean	(Malaysia) Tan Wee Gieen (Malaysia) Peck Yen Wei	21–17, 21–18	(gold) Winner
2015	Thailand International	(Malaysia) Tan Chee Tean	(South Korea) Choi Sol-gyu (South Korea) Chae Yoo-jung	21–18, 19–21, 12–21	(silver) Runner-up
2015	Bangladesh International	(Malaysia) Tan Wee Gieen	(Singapore) Terry Hee (Singapore) Tan Wei Han	10–21, 21–19, 12–21	(silver) Runner-up
2016	Romanian International	(Malaysia) Wong Fai Yin	(Malaysia) Ong Yew Sin (Malaysia) Peck Yen Wei	21–15, 21–17	(gold) Winner
2016	Smiling Fish International	(Malaysia) Wong Fai Yin	(Singapore) Terry Hee (Singapore) Tan Wei Han	16–21, 17–21	(silver) Runner-up
2016	Malaysia International	(Malaysia) Goh Soon Huat	(Chinese Taipei) Yang Po-hsuan (Chinese Taipei) Wen Hao-yun	21–13, 21–17	(gold) Winner
2016	Welsh International	(Malaysia) Goh Soon Huat	(Poland) Robert Mateusiak (Poland) Nadieżda Zięba	16–21, 21–11, 18–21	(silver) Runner-up

BWF International Challenge tournament
BWF International Series tournament
