= Low Juan Shen =

Malaysian badminton player (born 1993)

Low Juan Shen 刘隽程
Personal information
- Born: 30 December 1993 (age 32) Seremban, Negeri Sembilan, Malaysia
- Height: 1.8 m (5 ft 11 in)

Sport
- Country: Malaysia
- Sport: Badminton
- Handedness: Right

Men's & mixed doubles
- Highest ranking: 26 (MD 7 September 2017); 508 (XD 14 March 2013)
- Current ranking: 155 (with Goh V Shem) , 83 (with Nur Mohd Azriyn Ayub) (MD 6 June 2023)
- BWF profile
Medal record
Men's badminton
Representing Malaysia
Summer Universiade
Bronze medal – third place	2015 Gwangju	Men's doubles
Bronze medal – third place	2015 Gwangju	Mixed team
World Junior Championships
Gold medal – first place	2011 Taipei	Mixed team
Asian Junior Championships
Silver medal – second place	2011 Lucknow	Mixed team

Low Juan Shen (Chinese: 刘隽程, born 30 December 1993) is a Malaysian badminton player. He won the men's doubles title at the 2018 World University Championships partnered with Nur Mohd Azriyn Ayub.

== Achievements ==
=== Summer Universiade ===
Men's doubles
Year	Venue	Partner	Opponent	Score	Result
2015	Hwasun Hanium Culture Sports Center; Hwasun, South Korea	(Malaysia) Mohamad Arif Abdul Latif	(China) Wang Yilyu (China) Zhang Wen	21–18, 17–21, 11–21	Bronze

=== World University Championships ===
Men's doubles
Year	Venue	Partner	Opponent	Score	Result
2018	Stadium Juara; Kuala Lumpur, Malaysia	(Malaysia) Nur Mohd Azriyn Ayub	(South Korea) Kim Hwi-tae (South Korea) Kim Jae-hwan	21–7, 21–18	Gold

=== BWF Grand Prix (1 runner-up) ===
The BWF Grand Prix had two levels, the BWF Grand Prix and Grand Prix Gold. It was a series of badminton tournaments sanctioned by the Badminton World Federation (BWF) which was held from 2007 to 2017.

Men's doubles
Year	Tournament	Partner	Opponent	Score	Result
2017	Russian Open	(Malaysia) Chooi Kah Ming	(Russia) Vladimir Ivanov (Russia) Ivan Sozonov	6–11, 9–11, 5–11	(silver) Runner-up

BWF Grand Prix Gold tournament
BWF Grand Prix tournament

=== BWF International Challenge/Series (5 titles, 1 runner-up) ===
Men's doubles
Year	Tournament	Partner	Opponent	Score	Result
2012	Malaysia International	(Malaysia) Tan Yip Jiun	(Malaysia) Goh V Shem (Malaysia) Teo Ee Yi	15–21, 12–21	(silver) Runner-up
2014	Vietnam International Series	(Malaysia) Ong Yew Sin	(Malaysia) Jagdish Singh (Malaysia) Roni Tan Wee Long	21–19, 21–13	(gold) Winner
2014	Bangladesh International	(Malaysia) Ong Yew Sin	(Malaysia) Darren Isaac Devadass (Malaysia) Tai An Khang	19–21, 21–8, 21–13	(gold) Winner
2016	Indonesia International	(Malaysia) Chooi Kah Ming	(Malaysia) Lee Jian Yi (Malaysia) Lim Zhen Ting	21–15, 21–19	(gold) Winner
2016	Malaysia International	(Malaysia) Chooi Kah Ming	(Chinese Taipei) Lu Ching-yao (Chinese Taipei) Yang Po-han	21–9, 21–13	(gold) Winner
2019	Lao International	(Malaysia) Chooi Kah Ming	(Malaysia) Low Hang Yee (Malaysia) Ng Eng Cheong	18–21, 21–18, 21–14	(gold) Winner

BWF International Challenge tournament
BWF International Series tournament
BWF Future Series tournament
