= Lim Zhen Ting =

Malaysian badminton player (born 1995)

Lim Zhen Ting 林政廷
Personal information
- Born: 10 August 1995 (age 31)

Sport
- Country: Malaysia
- Sport: Badminton
- Handedness: Right

Men's singles & doubles
- Highest ranking: 334 (MS 3 September 2015); 79 (MD 13 October 2016); 381 (XD 7 April 2016)
- BWF profile

Lim Zhen Ting (born 10 August 1995) is a Malaysian badminton player. He and his partner, Lee Jian Yi reached a career-high ranking of 79 in the men's doubles discipline.

== Career ==
In 2016, Lim and Lee were semifinalists at the Vietnam International Series. Months later, they reached the final of the Indonesia International Challenge but lost out to their compatriots, Chooi Kah Ming and Low Juan Shen.

He reached two finals in 2017, the Lao International and the Malaysia International Series. They won their first title in the Malaysia International. In 2019, they were semifinalists at the Malaysian National Circuit Grand Prix Finals.

== Achievements ==
=== BWF International Challenge/Series (1 title, 2 runners-up) ===
Men's doubles
Year	Tournament	Partner	Opponent	Score	Result
2016	Indonesia International	(Malaysia) Lee Jian Yi	(Malaysia) Chooi Kah Ming (Malaysia) Low Juan Shen	15–21, 19–21	(silver) Runner-up
2017	Malaysia International Series	(Malaysia) Lee Jian Yi	(Malaysia) Chen Tang Jie (Malaysia) Soh Wooi Yik	24–22, 21–19	(gold) Winner
2017	Lao International	(Malaysia) Lee Jian Yi	(Malaysia) Muhammad Syawal Mohd Ismail (Indonesia) Lukhi Apri Nugroho	21–17, 10–21, 14–21	(silver) Runner-up

BWF International Challenge tournament
BWF International Series tournament
BWF Future Series tournament
