= Lee Jian Yi =

Malaysian badminton player (born 1995)

Lee Jian Yi 李健亿
Personal information
- Born: 25 April 1995 (age 31) Selangor, Malaysia

Sport
- Country: Malaysia
- Sport: Badminton
- Handedness: Right

Men's singles & doubles
- Highest ranking: 652 (MS 20 August 2015); 79 (MD 13 October 2016); 183 (XD 18 June 2015)
- BWF profile

Lee Jian Yi (born 25 April 1995) is a Malaysian badminton player. He and his partner, Lim Zhen Ting reached a career-high ranking of 79 in the men's doubles discipline.

== Career ==
In 2016, he partnered with Lim and were semifinalists at the Vietnam International Series. Months later, they reached the final of the Indonesia International Challenge but lost out to their compatriots, Chooi Kah Ming and Low Juan Shen.

He reached two finals in 2017, the Lao International and the Malaysia International Series. They won their first title in the Malaysia International. In 2019, they were semifinalists at the Malaysian National Circuit Grand Prix Finals.

== Achievements ==
=== BWF International Challenge/Series (1 title, 2 runners-up) ===
Men's doubles
Year	Tournament	Partner	Opponent	Score	Result
2016	Indonesia International	(Malaysia) Lim Zhen Ting	(Malaysia) Chooi Kah Ming (Malaysia) Low Juan Shen	15–21, 19–21	(silver) Runner-up
2017	Malaysia International Series	(Malaysia) Lim Zhen Ting	(Malaysia) Chen Tang Jie (Malaysia) Soh Wooi Yik	24–22, 21–19	(gold) Winner
2017	Lao International	(Malaysia) Lim Zhen Ting	(Malaysia) Muhammad Syawal Mohd Ismail (Indonesia) Lukhi Apri Nugroho	21–17, 10–21, 14–21	(silver) Runner-up

BWF International Challenge tournament
BWF International Series tournament
BWF Future Series tournament
