= Lao International =

The Lao International is an international badminton tournament held in Laos. The event is part of the Badminton World Federation's International Series and part of the Badminton Asia Circuit.

== Past winners ==
Year	Men's singles	Women's singles	Men's doubles	Women's doubles	Mixed doubles
2008	(Indonesia) Hendri Aprilliyanto	(Vietnam) Lê Ngọc Nguyên Nhung	(Indonesia) Afiat Yuris Wirawan (Indonesia) Wifqi Windarto	(Indonesia) Annisa Wahyuni (Indonesia) Nimas Rani Wijayanti	(Vietnam) Dương Bảo Đức (Vietnam) Thái Thị Hồng Gấm
2009	(Malaysia) Beryno Wong	(Japan) Chie Umezu	(Indonesia) Berry Angriawan (Indonesia) Muhammad Ulinnuha	(Japan) Aki Akao (Japan) Yasuyo Imabeppu	(Vietnam) Dương Bảo Đức (Vietnam) Thái Thị Hồng Gấm
2010	(Indonesia) Tommy Sugiarto	(Thailand) Nitchaon Jindapol	(Thailand) Patiphat Chalardchaleam (Thailand) Nipitphon Phuangphuapet	(Japan) Rie Eto (Japan) Yu Wakita	(Philippines) Kennevic Asuncion (Philippines) Kennie Asuncion
2017	(Thailand) Kantawat Leelavechabutr	(Vietnam) Nguyễn Thùy Linh	(Malaysia) Muhammad Syawal Mohd Ismail (Indonesia) Lukhi Apri Nugroho	(Thailand) Kittipak Dubthuk (Thailand) Natcha Saengchote	(Indonesia) Lukhi Apri Nugroho (Indonesia) Ririn Amelia
2019	(Japan) Kodai Naraoka	(Japan) Natsuki Oie	(Malaysia) Chooi Kah Ming (Malaysia) Low Juan Shen	(Singapore) Jin Yujia (Singapore) Lim Ming Hui	(Thailand) Weeraphat Phakjarung (Thailand) Chasinee Korepap
2020	Cancelled (Note: This tournament, originally to be played from 18 to 23 February, was later cancelled.)				

== Performances by nation ==
Top Nations
Pos	Nation	MS	WS	MD	WD	XD	Total
1	Indonesia	2		2.5	1	1	6.5
2	Japan	1	2		2		5
2	Thailand	1	1	1	1	1	5
4	Vietnam		2			2	4
5	Malaysia	1		1.5			2.5
6	Philippines					1	1
6	Singapore				1		1
Total		5	5	5	5	5	25
