= Malaysia International =

Open international badminton championships

The Malaysia International is an open international badminton tournament in Malaysia established since 1997. This tournament is also known as Malaysia Satellite, Malaysia Asian Satellite, and Malaysia International Challenge. The annual tournament has been classified as BWF International Challenge tournament since Badminton World Federation (BWF) introduced in 2007. Other tournaments held in Malaysia with higher level and prize money are named Malaysia Masters and Malaysia Open.

== Previous winners ==
=== Malaysia International Challenge ===
Year	Men's singles	Women's singles	Men's doubles	Women's doubles	Mixed doubles	Ref
1997	(Indonesia) Marleve Mainaky	(Indonesia) Ellen Angelina	(Indonesia) Ade Lukas (Indonesia) Ade Sutrisna	(Indonesia) Upi Chrisnawati (Indonesia) Angeline de Pauw	(Malaysia) Rosman Razak (Malaysia) Joanne Quay	
1998	(Malaysia) James Chua	(Malaysia) Woon Sze Mei	(Malaysia) Cheah Soon Thoe (Malaysia) Pang Cheh Chang	(Malaysia) Norhasikin Amin (Malaysia) Joanne Quay	(Malaysia) Pang Cheh Chang (Malaysia) Norhasikin Amin	
1999	(Malaysia) Ismail Saman	(Malaysia) Woon Sze Mei	(Malaysia) Rosman Razak (Malaysia) Tan Kim Her	(Thailand) Sathinee Chankrachangwong (Thailand) Thitikan Duangsiri	(Malaysia) Rosman Razak (Malaysia) Norhasikin Amin	
2000	No competition					
2001	(Malaysia) Muhammad Hafiz Hashim	(Singapore) Frances Liu	(Malaysia) Jeremy Gan (Malaysia) Ng Kean Kok	(China) Li Yujia (China) Cheng Jiao	(China) Chen Jibin (China) Cheng Jiao	
2002	(South Korea) Park Tae-sang	(South Korea) Lee Jong-boon	(South Korea) Ha Tae-kwon (South Korea) Kim Dong-moon	(South Korea) Chung Jae-hee (South Korea) Yim Kyung-jin	(South Korea) Ha Tae-kwon (South Korea) Lee Kyung-won	
2003	(Malaysia) Lee Chong Wei	(China) Li Wenyan	(Malaysia) Gan Teik Chai (Malaysia) Koo Kien Keat	(Japan) Aki Akao (Japan) Tomomi Matsuda	(Malaysia) Gan Teik Chai (Malaysia) Fong Chew Yen	
2004	(Vietnam) Nguyễn Tiến Minh	(Indonesia) Maria Kristin Yulianti	(Malaysia) Chew Choon Eng (Malaysia) Choong Tan Fook	(Malaysia) Fong Chew Yen (Malaysia) See Phui Leng	(New Zealand) Daniel Shirley (New Zealand) Sara Petersen	
2005	(South Korea) Shon Seung-mo	(South Korea) Bae Seung-hee	(Malaysia) Mohd Zakry Abdul Latif (Malaysia) Gan Teik Chai	(Indonesia) Meiliana Jauhari (Indonesia) Purwati	(Malaysia) Gan Teik Chai (Malaysia) Fong Chew Yen	
2006	(Indonesia) Jeffer Rosobin	(Malaysia) Sutheaswari Mudukasan	(Malaysia) Ong Soon Hock (Malaysia) Tan Bin Shen	(South Korea) Jung Yeon-kyung (South Korea) Kim Min-jung	(South Korea) Shin Baek-cheol (South Korea) Kim Min-jung	
2007	(Malaysia) Sairul Amar Ayob	(Thailand) Porntip Buranaprasertsuk	(Malaysia) Chan Peng Soon (Malaysia) Chang Hun Pin	(Malaysia) Haw Chiou Hwee (Malaysia) Lim Pek Siah	(Malaysia) Lim Khim Wah (Malaysia) Ng Hui Lin	
2008	(Malaysia) Kuan Beng Hong	(Indonesia) Febby Angguni	(Malaysia) Goh Wei Shem (Malaysia) Robert Lin Woon Fui	(South Korea) Bae Seung-hee (South Korea) Park Sun-young	(Malaysia) Mohd Lutfi Zaim Abdul Khalid (Malaysia) Lim Yin Loo	
2009	(Malaysia) Chong Wei Feng	(Thailand) Sapsiree Taerattanachai	(Malaysia) Chan Peng Soon (Malaysia) Lim Khim Wah	(Japan) Rie Eto (Japan) Yu Wakita	(Malaysia) Tan Wee Kiong (Malaysia) Woon Khe Wei	
2010	(Indonesia) Tommy Sugiarto	(Japan) Ayane Kurihara	(Malaysia) Goh Wei Shem (Malaysia) Lim Khim Wah	(Malaysia) Chin Eei Hui (Malaysia) Lai Pei Jing	(Malaysia) Lim Khim Wah (Malaysia) Chong Sook Chin	
2011	(Indonesia) Alamsyah Yunus	(Indonesia) Bellaetrix Manuputty	(Japan) Takeshi Kamura (Japan) Keigo Sonoda	(Japan) Naoko Fukuman (Japan) Kurumi Yonao	(Malaysia) Tan Aik Quan (Malaysia) Lai Pei Jing	
2012	(Indonesia) Wisnu Yuli Prasetyo	(Malaysia) Lydia Cheah Li Ya	(Malaysia) Goh V Shem (Malaysia) Teo Ee Yi	(Malaysia) Chow Mei Kuan (Malaysia) Lee Meng Yean	(Malaysia) Ong Jian Guo (Malaysia) Woon Khe Wei	
2013	(Malaysia) Mohamad Arif Abdul Latif	(Chinese Taipei) Hsu Ya-ching	(Indonesia) Selvanus Geh (Indonesia) Alfian Eko Prasetya	(Japan) Asumi Kugo (Japan) Yui Miyauchi	(Indonesia) Alfian Eko Prasetya (Indonesia) Shella Devi Aulia	
2014	(South Korea) Lee Hyun-il	(Singapore) Chen Jiayuan	(Chinese Taipei) Lin Chia-yu (Chinese Taipei) Wu Hsiao-lin	(Japan) Ayane Kurihara (Japan) Naru Shinoya	(Indonesia) Hafiz Faizal (Indonesia) Shella Devi Aulia	
2015	(Thailand) Khosit Phetpradab	(Singapore) Liang Xiaoyu	(Chinese Taipei) Lin Chia-yu (Chinese Taipei) Wu Hsiao-lin	(Indonesia) Della Destiara Haris (Indonesia) Rosyita Eka Putri Sari	(Thailand) Bodin Isara (Thailand) Savitree Amitrapai	
2016	(Indonesia) Panji Ahmad Maulana	(Japan) Sayaka Takahashi	(Malaysia) Chooi Kah Ming (Malaysia) Low Juan Shen	(Malaysia) Chow Mei Kuan (Malaysia) Lee Meng Yean	(Malaysia) Goh Soon Huat (Malaysia) Shevon Jemie Lai	
2017	(Malaysia) Iskandar Zulkarnain Zainuddin	(Indonesia) Ruselli Hartawan	(Malaysia) Goh Sze Fei (Malaysia) Nur Izzuddin	(Japan) Misato Aratama (Japan) Akane Watanabe	(Japan) Hiroki Okamura (Japan) Naru Shinoya	
2018	(Chinese Taipei) Hsueh Hsuan-yi	(China) Wang Zhiyi	(Indonesia) Mohammad Ahsan (Indonesia) Hendra Setiawan	(Malaysia) Soong Fie Cho (Malaysia) Tee Jing Yi	(Malaysia) Chen Tang Jie (Malaysia) Peck Yen Wei	
2019	(Malaysia) Cheam June Wei	(China) Wang Zhiyi	(Japan) Hiroki Midorikawa (Japan) Kyohei Yamashita	(Japan) Natsu Saito (Japan) Naru Shinoya	(China) Dong Weijie (China) Chen Xiaofei	
2020	Cancelled (Note: This tournament, originally to be played from 3 to 8 November, was later cancelled due to the COVID-19 pandemic in Malaysia.)					
2021	Cancelled (Note: This tournament, originally to be played from 9 to 14 November, was later cancelled due to the COVID-19 pandemic in Malaysia.)					
2022	(Malaysia) Justin Hoh	(Indonesia) Yulia Yosephine Susanto	(Malaysia) Muhammad Haikal (Malaysia) Nur Izzuddin	(Singapore) Jin Yujia (Singapore) Crystal Wong	(Malaysia) Hoo Pang Ron (Malaysia) Teoh Mei Xing	
2023	(Japan) Minoru Koga	(Japan) Miho Kayama	(Japan) Takuto Inoue (Japan) Masayuki Onodera	(Chinese Taipei) Lin Chih-chun (Chinese Taipei) Sung Yu-hsuan	(Malaysia) Hoo Pang Ron (Malaysia) Cheng Su Yin	
2024	(Japan) Minoru Koga	(Japan) Riko Gunji	(Philippines) Solomon Padiz Jr. (Philippines) Julius Villabrille	(Japan) Naru Shinoya (Japan) Nao Yamakita	(Indonesia) Amri Syahnawi (Indonesia) Nita Violina Marwah	
2025	(Malaysia) Eogene Ewe	(India) Devika Sihag	(Japan) Keiichiro Matsui (Japan) Katsuki Tamate	(South Korea) Jeon Jui (South Korea) Kim Ha-na	(Malaysia) Tan Zhi Yang (Malaysia) Nicole Tan	
2026	(Japan) Shogo Ogawa	(Thailand) Sarunrak Vitidsarn	(Japan) Naoya Kawashima (Japan) Kota Ogawa	(Japan) Mikoto Aiso (Japan) Momoha Niimi	(Japan) Kota Ogawa (Japan) Misaki Kurashima	

=== Malaysia International Series ===
Year	Men's singles	Women's singles	Men's doubles	Women's doubles	Mixed doubles	Ref
2017	(Singapore) Loh Kean Yew	(Malaysia) Kisona Selvaduray	(Malaysia) Lee Jian Yi (Malaysia) Lim Zhen Ting	(Malaysia) Soong Fie Cho (Malaysia) Tee Jing Yi	(Indonesia) Yantoni Edy Saputra (Indonesia) Marsheilla Gischa Islami	
2018	(Indonesia) Gatjra Piliang Fiqihilahi Cupu	(Malaysia) Kisona Selvaduray	(South Korea) Ko Sung-hyun (South Korea) Shin Baek-cheol	(Malaysia) Payee Lim Peiy Yee (Malaysia) Thinaah Muralitharan	(Indonesia) Andika Ramadiansyah (Indonesia) Bunga Fitriani Romadhini	
2019	(Malaysia) Soong Joo Ven	(Indonesia) Sri Fatmawati	(Indonesia) Leo Rolly Carnando (Indonesia) Daniel Marthin	(Malaysia) Pearly Tan (Malaysia) Thinaah Muralitharan	(Indonesia) Amri Syahnawi (Indonesia) Pia Zebadiah Bernadet	
2020	Cancelled (Note: This tournament, originally to be played from 16 to 21 June, was later cancelled due to the COVID-19 pandemic in Malaysia.)					
2021	Cancelled (Note: This tournament, originally to be played from 10 to 15 August, was later cancelled due to the COVID-19 pandemic in Malaysia.)					
2022	(Indonesia) Syabda Perkasa Belawa	(China) Gao Fangjie	(China) Chen Boyang (China) Liu Yi	(China) Liu Shengshu (China) Tan Ning	(China) Cheng Xing (China) Chen Fanghui	
2023	(Indonesia) Ikhsan Rumbay	(Singapore) Insyirah Khan	(Malaysia) Fazriq Razif (Malaysia) Wong Vin Sean	(Indonesia) Isyana Syahira Meida (Indonesia) Rinjani Kwinnara Nastine	(Malaysia) Loo Bing Kun (Malaysia) Cheng Su Yin	
2024	(Indonesia) Richie Duta Richardo	(Malaysia) Siti Zulaikha	(Indonesia) Emanuel Randhy Febryto (Indonesia) Reza Dwicahya Purnama	(China) Lin Fangling (China) Zhou Xinru	(China) Shang Yichen (China) Lin Fangling	
2025	(South Korea) Park Sang-yong	(South Korea) Kim Seong-min	(Malaysia) Muhammad Faiq (Malaysia) Lok Hong Quan	(South Korea) Jang Eun-seo (South Korea) Kim Yu-jung	(South Korea) Kim Jae-hyeon (South Korea) Jang Eun-seo	
2026	(Malaysia) Danial Razeeq	(Thailand) Anyapat Phichitpreechasak	(Malaysia) Lau Yi Sheng (Malaysia) Lee Yi Bo	(Chinese Taipei) Hsieh Mi-yen (Chinese Taipei) Yu Chien-hui	(Malaysia) Irfan Shazmir (Malaysia) Genevie Lim	

== Performances by nation ==
=== Malaysia International Challenge ===
As of the 2026 edition

Rank	Nation	MS	WS	MD	WD	XD	Total
1	Malaysia*	12	4	15	7	16	54
2	Japan	3	4	5	9	2	23
3	Indonesia	6	6	3	3	3	21
4	South Korea	3	2	1	4	2	12
5	China	0	3	0	1	2	6
5	Thailand	1	3	0	1	1	6
7	Chinese Taipei	1	1	2	1	0	5
8	Singapore	0	3	0	1	0	4
9	India	0	1	0	0	0	1
9	New Zealand	0	0	0	0	1	1
9	Philippines	0	0	1	0	0	1
9	Vietnam	1	0	0	0	0	1
Total		27	27	27	27	27	135

=== Malaysia International Series ===
As of 2026 edition

Rank	Nation	MS	WS	MD	WD	XD	Total
1	Malaysia*	2	3	4	3	2	14
2	Indonesia	4	1	2	1	3	11
3	China		1	1	2	2	6
4	South Korea	1	1	1	1	1	5
5	Singapore	1	1				2
6	Chinese Taipei				1		1
6	Thailand		1				1
Total		8	8	8	8	8	40

* Host nation

== See also ==
- Malaysia Open
- Malaysia Masters
- Malaysia Masters Super 100
