= 2017 Chinese Taipei Open Grand Prix Gold =

Tournament details
- Dates: 27 June – 2 July 2016
- Level: Grand Prix Gold
- Total prize money: US$200,000
- Venue: Taipei Arena
- Location: Taipei, Chinese Taipei

Champions
- Men's singles: (Chinese Taipei) Chou Tien-chen
- Women's singles: (Japan) Saena Kawakami
- Men's doubles: (Chinese Taipei) Chen Hung-ling (Chinese Taipei) Wang Chi-lin
- Women's doubles: (South Korea) Chae Yoo-jung (South Korea) Kim So-yeong
- Mixed doubles: (South Korea) Seo Seung-jae (South Korea) Kim Ha-na

The 2017 Chinese Taipei Open Grand Prix Gold is the eighth Grand Prix's badminton tournament of the 2017 BWF Grand Prix Gold and Grand Prix. The tournament was held at the Taipei Arena in Taipei, Chinese Taipei on 27 June – 2 July 2017 and has a total purse of $200,000.

== Men's singles ==
=== Seeds ===
1. (Chinese Taipei) Chou Tien-chen (champion)
2. (Chinese Taipei) Wang Tzu-wei (final)
3. (Chinese Taipei) Hsu Jen-hao (third round)
4. (India) Sourabh Verma (first round)
5. (Malaysia) Iskandar Zulkarnain Zainuddin (second round)
6. (South Korea) Jeon Hyeok-jin (semifinals)
7. (Malaysia) Chong Wei Feng (third round)
8. (Thailand) Khosit Phetpradab (quarterfinals)
9. (Chinese Taipei) Lin Yu-hsien (quarterfinals)
10. (Chinese Taipei) Hsueh Hsuan-yi (third round)
11. (Malaysia) Liew Daren (quarterfinals)
12. (Russia) Vladimir Malkov (second round)
13. (Thailand) Suppanyu Avihingsanon (quarterfinals)
14. (India) Harsheel Dani (second round)
15. (India) Abhishek Yelegar (second round)
16. (India) Siril Verma (third round)

=== Finals ===
Quarterfinals
1	(Chinese Taipei) Chou Tien-chen	21	21
9	(Chinese Taipei) Lin Yu-hsien	16	15
(Malaysia) Lee Zii Jia	21	21
8	(Thailand) Khosit Phetpradab	19	16
6	(South Korea) Jeon Hyeok-jin	21	18	21
11	(Malaysia) Liew Daren	13	21	14
13	(Thailand) Suppanyu Avihingsanon	8	21	11
2	(Chinese Taipei) Wang Tzu-wei	21	19	21

Semifinals
1	(Chinese Taipei) Chou Tien-chen	15	21	21
(Malaysia) Lee Zii Jia	21	10	12
6	(South Korea) Jeon Hyeok-jin	18	18
2	(Chinese Taipei) Wang Tzu-wei	21	21

Final
1	(Chinese Taipei) Chou Tien-chen	18	21	21
2	(Chinese Taipei) Wang Tzu-wei	21	19	15

=== Top half ===
==== Section 1 ====
First round
1	(Chinese Taipei) Chou T-c	21	21
(Malaysia) Jimmy Tay Y L	14	8
(Singapore) Ryan Ng Z R	21	16	21
Q6	(Chinese Taipei) Cheng P-w	8	21	12
12	(Russia) V Malkov	21	21
(Indonesia) H Kho Wibowo	14	10
(South Korea) Kim M-k	21	17	8
(Chinese Taipei) Chu H-c	19	21	21

Second round
1	(Chinese Taipei) Chou T-c	22	21
(Singapore) Ryan Ng Z R	20	11
12	(Russia) V Malkov	20	17^{r}
(Chinese Taipei) Chu H-c	22	16

Third round
1	(Chinese Taipei) Chou T-c	21	21
(Chinese Taipei) Chu H-c	14	12

==== Section 2 ====
First round
5	(Malaysia) I Z Zainuddin	18	21	21
(Chinese Taipei) Teng S-h	21	17	19
(Malaysia) Goh G C	21	21
Q2	(Chinese Taipei) Lin C-y	15	16
9	(Chinese Taipei) Lin Y-h
Q1	BYE
(Brunei) J Yu	7	8
(Chinese Taipei) Chen C-w	21	21

Second round
5	(Malaysia) I Z Zainuddin	15	21	19
(Malaysia) Goh G C	21	18	21
9	(Chinese Taipei) Lin Y-h	21	21
(Chinese Taipei) Chen C-w	19	16

Third round
(Malaysia) Goh G C	15	11
9	(Chinese Taipei) Lin Y-h	21	21

==== Section 3 ====
First round
4	(India) S Verma	19	20
(Malaysia) Lee Z J	21	22
(Chinese Taipei) Chang E-c	w	/	o
(India) R Y Chittaboina
16	(India) S Verma	21	10	21
(Chinese Taipei) Liu W-c	11	21	19
(Chinese Taipei) Lee C-h	21	21
(Malaysia) Lim C W	17	14

Second round
(Malaysia) Lee Z J	21	21
(Chinese Taipei) Chang E-c	12	11
16	(India) S Verma	16	21	21
(Chinese Taipei) Lee C-h	21	17	17

Third round
(Malaysia) Lee Z J	21	21
16	(India) S Verma	12	16

==== Section 4 ====
First round
8	(Thailand) K Phetpradab	17	21	21
(South Korea) Kim D-h	21	18	15
(South Africa) J Maliekal	21	21
(Chinese Taipei) Chen S-c	18	14
15	(India) A Yelegar	20	21	21
(Malaysia) Adam Lau Y M	22	14	10
(England) Y Wang	10	16
PFQ	(South Korea) Woo S-h	21	21

Second round
8	(Thailand) K Phetpradab	21	21
(South Africa) J Maliekal	17	14
15	(India) A Yelegar	17	21	6
PFQ	(South Korea) Woo S-h	21	17	21

Third round
8	(Thailand) K Phetpradab	5	21	21
PFQ	(South Korea) Woo S-h	21	12	10

=== Bottom half ===
==== Section 5 ====
First round
(South Korea) Ha Y-w	24	21	21
(Chinese Taipei) Kan C-y	22	23	13
(Hong Kong) Lee C W	12	14
14	(India) H Dani	21	21
(Chinese Taipei) Lu C-h	21	21
Q3	(Chinese Taipei) Hung C-c	10	12
(Chinese Taipei) Yang C-h	17	14
6	(South Korea) Jeon H-j	21	21

Second round
(South Korea) Ha Y-w	21	21
14	(India) H Dani	12	6
(Chinese Taipei) Lu C-h	8	9
6	(South Korea) Jeon H-j	21	21

Third round
(South Korea) Ha Y-w	12	12
6	(South Korea) Jeon H-j	21	21

==== Section 6 ====
First round
Q7	(Hong Kong) Chan Y C	21	20	21
(Chinese Taipei) Chen C-t	16	22	13
(Chinese Taipei) Lin C-h	17	21	12
11	(Malaysia) Liew D	21	9	21
(Chinese Taipei) Shih K-c	21	21
(India) K Gulshan Kumar	19	19
(Canada) T Chiu	10	13
3	(Chinese Taipei) Hsu J-h	21	21

Second round
Q7	(Hong Kong) Chan Y C	16	21	11
11	(Malaysia) Liew D	21	17	21
(Chinese Taipei) Shih K-c	13	12
3	(Chinese Taipei) Hsu J-h	21	21

Third round
11	(Malaysia) Liew D	21	21
3	(Chinese Taipei) Hsu J-h	17	17

==== Section 7 ====
First round
(Chinese Taipei) Chi Y-j	15	21	21
(Singapore) Loh K Y	21	18	17
(India) S Thakur	16	16
13	(Thailand) S Avihingsanon	21	21
(England) H S Wong	17	9
Q4	(Chinese Taipei) Huang D-w	21	21
(Indonesia) N E Sulistyo	8	5^{r}
7	(Malaysia) Chong W F	21	18

Second round
(Chinese Taipei) Chi Y-j	17	16
13	(Thailand) S Avihingsanon	21	21
Q4	(Chinese Taipei) Huang D-w	15	17
7	(Malaysia) Chong W F	21	21

Third round
13	(Thailand) S Avihingsanon	21	21
7	(Malaysia) Chong W F	17	9

==== Section 8 ====
First round
(Thailand) A Namkul	21	21
Q8	(England) K H Tang	11	11
(India) H M.Gowda	13	10
10	(Chinese Taipei) Hsueh H-y	21	21
(India) H Aggarwal	17	21	19
Q5	(Malaysia) Alfred Lau Y L	21	16	21
(Thailand) K Wangcharoen	16	16
2	(Chinese Taipei) Wang T-w	21	21

Second round
(Thailand) A Namkul	17	10
10	(Chinese Taipei) Hsueh H-y	21	21
Q5	(Malaysia) Alfred Lau Y L	17	13
2	(Chinese Taipei) Wang T-w	21	21

Third round
10	(Chinese Taipei) Hsueh H-y	15	6
2	(Chinese Taipei) Wang T-w	21	21

== Women's singles ==
=== Seeds ===
1. (Chinese Taipei) Tai Tzu-ying (withdrew)
2. (Chinese Taipei) Hsu Ya-ching (second round)
3. (Malaysia) Goh Jin Wei (final)
4. (Chinese Taipei) Chiang Mei-hui (first round)
5. (Chinese Taipei) Lee Chia-hsin (second round)
6. (Malaysia) Lee Ying Ying (first round)
7. (Chinese Taipei) Chen Su-yu (first round)
8. (Singapore) Yeo Jia Min (second round)

=== Finals ===
Semifinals
(Japan) Saena Kawakami	21	21
Q3	(Japan) Natsumi Shimoda	8	15
3	(Malaysia) Goh Jin Wei	21	21
(Japan) Haruko Suzuki	16	17

Final
(Japan) Saena Kawakami	21	21
3	(Malaysia) Goh Jin Wei	17	17

=== Top half ===
==== Section 1 ====
First round
PFQ	(South Korea) Lee M-j	21	21
Q1	(Chinese Taipei) Lai I-t	11	15
(India) S U R Chukka	7	17
(South Korea) Kim N-y	21	21
8	(Singapore) Yeo J M	21	21
(Chinese Taipei) Hu L-f	19	17
(Chinese Taipei) Tang W-y	17	14
(Japan) S Kawakami	21	21

Second round
PFQ	(South Korea) Lee M-j	15	17
(South Korea) Kim N-y	21	21
8	(Singapore) Yeo J M	11	10
(Japan) S Kawakami	21	21

Quarterfinals
(South Korea) Kim N-y	16	11
(Japan) S Kawakami	21	21

==== Section 2 ====
First round
4	(Chinese Taipei) Chiang M-h	17	22	9
(India) S K P Kudaravalli	21	20	21
(Chinese Taipei) Sung S-y	21	21
(Australia) J Tam	5	7
6	(Malaysia) Lee Y Y	17	18
Q3	(Japan) N Shimoda	21	21
Q4	(Chinese Taipei) Hsu W-c	21	21
(Malaysia) Yap R C	18	17

Second round
(India) S K P Kudaravalli	20	13
(Chinese Taipei) Sung S-y	22	21
Q3	(Japan) N Shimoda	18	25	21
Q4	(Chinese Taipei) Hsu W-c	21	23	12

Quarterfinals
(Chinese Taipei) Sung S-y	19	13
Q3	(Japan) N Shimoda	21	21

=== Bottom half ===
==== Section 3 ====
First round
(Chinese Taipei) Pai Y-p	21	21
(Singapore) Grace Chua H Z	13	5
(Japan) N Nidaira	14	8
5	(Chinese Taipei) Lee C-h	21	21
PFQ	(South Korea) Kim H-i	22	21
(Chinese Taipei) Hung Y-t	20	13
(Japan) K Imabeppu	21	17	14
3	(Malaysia) Goh J W	15	21	21

Second round
(Chinese Taipei) Pai Y-p	13	21	21
5	(Chinese Taipei) Lee C-h	21	18	16
PFQ	(South Korea) Kim H-i	6	9
3	(Malaysia) Goh J W	21	21

Quarterfinals
(Chinese Taipei) Pai Y-p	15	17
3	(Malaysia) Goh J W	21	21

==== Section 4 ====
First round
(Australia) Wendy Chen H-y	18	12
(Japan) H Suzuki	21	21
(Malaysia) Ho Y M	16	21	21
7	(Chinese Taipei) Chen S-y	21	13	17
Q2	(Chinese Taipei) Chen H-h	21	15	17
(South Korea) Kim G-e	17	21	21
(Indonesia) D R Vehrenica	6	7
2	(Chinese Taipei) Hsu Y-c	21	21

Second round
(Japan) H Suzuki	21	21
(Malaysia) Ho Y M	19	17
(South Korea) Kim G-e	25	23
2	(Chinese Taipei) Hsu Y-c	23	21

Quarterfinals
(Japan) H Suzuki	21	21
(South Korea) Kim G-e	8	17

== Men's doubles ==
=== Seeds ===
1. (Chinese Taipei) Lee Jhe-huei / Lee Yang (final)
2. (Chinese Taipei) Chen Hung-ling / Wang Chi-lin (champion)
3. (Chinese Taipei) Lu Ching-yao / Yang Po-han (semifinals)
4. (Malaysia) Chooi Kah Ming / Low Juan Shen (semifinals)
5. (South Korea) Chung Eui-seok / Kim Duk-young (quarterfinals)
6. (Chinese Taipei) Liao Min-chun / Su Cheng-heng (second round)
7. (Thailand) Trawut Potieng / Nanthakarn Yordphaisong (first round)
8. (Malaysia) Nur Mohd Azriyn Ayub / Jagdish Singh (first round)

=== Finals ===
Semifinals
1	(Chinese Taipei) Lee Jhe-huei (Chinese Taipei) Lee Yang	21	26
3	(Chinese Taipei) Lu Ching-yao (Chinese Taipei) Yang Po-han	19	24
4	(Malaysia) Chooi Kah Ming (Malaysia) Low Juan Shen	14	21	13
2	(Chinese Taipei) Chen Hung-ling (Chinese Taipei) Wang Chi-lin	21	19	21

Final
1	(Chinese Taipei) Lee Jhe-huei (Chinese Taipei) Lee Yang	16	20
2	(Chinese Taipei) Chen Hung-ling (Chinese Taipei) Wang Chi-lin	21	22

=== Top half ===
==== Section 1 ====
First round
1	(Chinese Taipei) Lee J-h (Chinese Taipei) Lee Y	21	21
(Thailand) T Isriyanet (Thailand) K Namdash	17	12
(Chinese Taipei) Chang K-c (Chinese Taipei) Liao K-h	21	21
(India) N Garg (India) A S Rai	5	8
5	(South Korea) Chung E-s (South Korea) Kim D-y	21	21
(Chinese Taipei) Po L-w (Chinese Taipei) Yang M-t	13	17
(Chinese Taipei) Liu W-c (Chinese Taipei) Tseng M-h	17	15
(Malaysia) Lim K W (Malaysia) Ooi Z H	21	21

Second round
1	(Chinese Taipei) Lee J-h (Chinese Taipei) Lee Y	21	21
(Chinese Taipei) Chang K-c (Chinese Taipei) Liao K-h	14	18
5	(South Korea) Chung E-s (South Korea) Kim D-y	21	21
(Malaysia) Lim K W (Malaysia) Ooi Z H	19	9

Quarterfinals
1	(Chinese Taipei) Lee J-h (Chinese Taipei) Lee Y	22	19	21
5	(South Korea) Chung E-s (South Korea) Kim D-y	20	21	13

==== Section 2 ====
First round
3	(Chinese Taipei) Lu C-y (Chinese Taipei) Yang P-h	21	21
(Hong Kong) Chan T K (Hong Kong) Chang T C	13	15
(Chinese Taipei) Lee C-h (Chinese Taipei) Tsai C-h	16	12
Q4	(South Korea) Kim W-h (South Korea) Seo S-j	21	21
8	(Malaysia) Nur M A A (Malaysia) J Singh
(Chinese Taipei) Lu C-p (Chinese Taipei) Wu Y-c	w	/	o
(South Korea) Kang M-h (South Korea) Lee H-s	21	21
Q1	(Indonesia) A Adistia (Malaysia) Ian Wong J S	8	14

Second round
3	(Chinese Taipei) Lu C-y (Chinese Taipei) Yang P-h	15	24	21
Q4	(South Korea) Kim W-h (South Korea) Seo S-j	21	22	19
(Chinese Taipei) Lu C-p (Chinese Taipei) Wu Y-c	21	14	21
(South Korea) Kang M-h (South Korea) Lee H-s	12	21	18

Quarterfinals
3	(Chinese Taipei) Lu C-y (Chinese Taipei) Yang P-h	21	21
(Chinese Taipei) Lu C-p (Chinese Taipei) Wu Y-c	19	12

=== Bottom half ===
==== Section 3 ====
First round
(South Korea) Choi S-g (South Korea) Kim J-h	21	21
(Chinese Taipei) Kan C-y (Chinese Taipei) Liao C-h	11	12
(Hong Kong) Ho W L (Hong Kong) Li K H	15	18
6	(Chinese Taipei) Liao M-c (Chinese Taipei) Su C-h	21	21
(Chinese Taipei) Lin S-k (Chinese Taipei) Yang P-h	22	21
(Thailand) I Apisuk (Thailand) T Viriyangkura	20	17
(Chinese Taipei) Chen C-j (Chinese Taipei) Hung Y-y	24	10
4	(Malaysia) Chooi K M (Malaysia) Low J S	26	21

Second round
(South Korea) Choi S-g (South Korea) Kim J-h	21	22
6	(Chinese Taipei) Liao M-c (Chinese Taipei) Su C-h	15	20
(Chinese Taipei) Lin S-k (Chinese Taipei) Yang P-h	17	18
4	(Malaysia) Chooi K M (Malaysia) Low J S	21	21

Quarterfinals
(South Korea) Choi S-g (South Korea) Kim J-h	21	20	26
4	(Malaysia) Chooi K M (Malaysia) Low J S	14	22	28

==== Section 4 ====
First round
(Chinese Taipei) Lee F-c (Chinese Taipei) Lee F-j	21	26	16
(Malaysia) Amir S A R (Malaysia) Tan W G	18	28	21
(Chinese Taipei) Lee S-m (Chinese Taipei) Lin C-y	21	21	21
7	(Thailand) T Potieng (Thailand) N Yordphaisong	16	23	16
Q2	(South Korea) Choi H-g (South Korea) Park K-h	19	21	21
(Chinese Taipei) J Ou (Chinese Taipei) Shang T-y	21	17	19
Q3	(South Korea) Choi J-w (South Korea) Kim H-t	19	12
2	(Chinese Taipei) Chen H-l (Chinese Taipei) Wang C-l	21	21

Second round
(Malaysia) Amir S A R (Malaysia) Tan W G	18	8
(Chinese Taipei) Lee S-m (Chinese Taipei) Lin C-y	21	21
Q2	(South Korea) Choi H-g (South Korea) Park K-h	11	16
2	(Chinese Taipei) Chen H-l (Chinese Taipei) Wang C-l	21	21

Quarterfinals
(Chinese Taipei) Lee S-m (Chinese Taipei) Lin C-y	19	9
2	(Chinese Taipei) Chen H-l (Chinese Taipei) Wang C-l	21	21

== Women's doubles ==
=== Seeds ===
1. (Australia) Setyana Mapasa / Gronya Somerville (withdrew)
2. (Chinese Taipei) Hsu Ya-ching / Wu Ti-jung (first round)
3. (Malaysia) Lim Yin Loo / Yap Cheng Wen (quarterfinals)
4. (Malaysia) Chow Mei Kuan / Lee Meng Yean (withdrew)

=== Finals ===
Semifinals
(South Korea) Kim Ha-na (South Korea) Kong Hee-yong	12	9
(South Korea) Kim Hye-rin (South Korea) Yoo Hae-won	21	21
(South Korea) Chae Yoo-jung (South Korea) Kim So-yeong	21	21
(Japan) Mayu Matsumoto (Japan) Wakana Nagahara	19	13

Final
(South Korea) Kim Hye-rin (South Korea) Yoo Hae-won	12	11
(South Korea) Chae Yoo-jung (South Korea) Kim So-yeong	21	21

=== Top half ===
==== Section 1 ====
First round
1	(Australia) S Mapasa (Australia) G Somerville
BYE
(Chinese Taipei) Lin X-m (Chinese Taipei) Wu F-c	15	21	21
(Hong Kong) Chow K L (Hong Kong) Tsang W C	21	19	14
(South Korea) Kim H-n (South Korea) Kong H-y	21	21
(Chinese Taipei) Cheng Y-c (Chinese Taipei) Hu L-f	16	12
(Chinese Taipei) Chang H-t (Chinese Taipei) Yu C-h	21	21
(Indonesia) C S Ayunidha (Indonesia) D R Vehrenica	12	11

Second round
1	(Australia) S Mapasa (Australia) G Somerville
(Chinese Taipei) Lin X-m (Chinese Taipei) Wu F-c	w	/	o
(South Korea) Kim H-n (South Korea) Kong H-y	21	21
(Chinese Taipei) Chang H-t (Chinese Taipei) Yu C-h	12	17

Quarterfinals
(Chinese Taipei) Lin X-m (Chinese Taipei) Wu F-c	14	22
(South Korea) Kim H-n (South Korea) Kong H-y	21	24

==== Section 2 ====
First round
4	(Malaysia) Chow M K (Malaysia) Lee M Y
(Singapore) Ong R N (Singapore) Crystal Wong J Y	w	/	o
(Japan) A Araki (Japan) A Matsuda	21	21
(Chinese Taipei) Chen H-h (Chinese Taipei) Liang T-y	10	15
(Chinese Taipei) Chang C-h (Chinese Taipei) Yang C-t	21	10	16
(South Korea) Kim H-r (South Korea) Yoo H-w	19	21	21
(Chinese Taipei) Chiang K-h (Chinese Taipei) Hung S-h	21	17	21
(Japan) M Kayama (Japan) M Yasuda	11	21	10

Second round
(Singapore) Ong R N (Singapore) Crystal Wong J Y	17	12
(Japan) A Araki (Japan) A Matsuda	21	21
(South Korea) Kim H-r (South Korea) Yoo H-w	21	21
(Chinese Taipei) Chiang K-h (Chinese Taipei) Hung S-h	8	12

Quarterfinals
(Japan) A Araki (Japan) A Matsuda	21	22	9
(South Korea) Kim H-r (South Korea) Yoo H-w	14	24	21

=== Bottom half ===
==== Section 3 ====
First round
(Indonesia) F Afni (Indonesia) S Putri	10	7^{r}
(Chinese Taipei) Lee W-t (Chinese Taipei) Yu M-j	21	11
(Chinese Taipei) Chang W-y (Chinese Taipei) Chang Y-h	7	13
(South Korea) Chae Y-j (South Korea) Kim S-y	21	21
(Australia) Wendy Chen H-y (Australia) J Tam	19	13
(Hong Kong) Wu Y T (Hong Kong) Yuen S Y	21	21
(Indonesia) K N Hanadia (Indonesia) D T Permatasari	22	14
3	(Malaysia) Lim Y L (Malaysia) Yap C W	24	21

Second round
(Chinese Taipei) Lee W-t (Chinese Taipei) Yu M-j	9	11
(South Korea) Chae Y-j (South Korea) Kim S-y	21	21
(Hong Kong) Wu Y T (Hong Kong) Yuen S Y	16	17
3	(Malaysia) Lim Y L (Malaysia) Yap C W	21	21

Quarterfinals
(South Korea) Chae Y-j (South Korea) Kim S-y	17	21	21
3	(Malaysia) Lim Y L (Malaysia) Yap C W	21	12	15

==== Section 4 ====
First round
(Chinese Taipei) Li Z-q (Chinese Taipei) Teng C-h	21	14	17
(Thailand) C Chaladchalam (Thailand) P Muenwong	18	21	21
(Chinese Taipei) Kuo Y-w (Chinese Taipei) Lin T-y	21	18	21
(Malaysia) Joyce Choong W C (Malaysia) Goh Y C	15	21	9
(South Korea) Baek H-n (South Korea) Lee Y-r	21	21
(Chinese Taipei) Wen H-y (Chinese Taipei) Ye J-y	14	7
(Japan) M Matsumoto (Japan) W Nagahara	21	21
2	(Chinese Taipei) Hsu Y-c (Chinese Taipei) Wu T-j	17	19

Second round
(Thailand) C Chaladchalam (Thailand) P Muenwong	15	21	21
(Chinese Taipei) Kuo Y-w (Chinese Taipei) Lin T-y	21	10	19
(South Korea) Baek H-n (South Korea) Lee Y-r	8	25	21
(Japan) M Matsumoto (Japan) W Nagahara	21	23	23

Quarterfinals
(Thailand) C Chaladchalam (Thailand) P Muenwong	17	22	19
(Japan) M Matsumoto (Japan) W Nagahara	21	20	21

== Mixed doubles ==
=== Seeds ===
1. (South Korea) Choi Sol-gyu / Chae Yoo-jung (semifinals)
2. (Singapore) Terry Hee Yong Kai / Tan Wei Han (quarterfinals)
3. (Chinese Taipei) Wang Chi-lin / Lee Chia-hsin (final)
4. (Chinese Taipei) Chang Ko-chi / Chang Hsin-tien (first round)
5. (Malaysia) Goh Soon Huat / Shevon Jemie Lai (first round)
6. (Chinese Taipei) Liao Min-chun / Chen Hsiao-huan (quarterfinals)
7. (Malaysia) Chan Peng Soon / Cheah Yee See (first round)
8. (Chinese Taipei) Lin Chia-yu / Wu Ti-jung (second round)

=== Finals ===
Semifinals
1	(South Korea) Choi Sol-gyu (South Korea) Chae Yoo-jung	20	11
3	(Chinese Taipei) Wang Chi-lin (Chinese Taipei) Lee Chia-hsin	22	21
(Thailand) Tinn Isriyanet (Thailand) Pacharapun Chochuwong	13	6
(South Korea) Seo Seung-jae (South Korea) Kim Ha-na	21	21

Final
3	(Chinese Taipei) Wang Chi-lin (Chinese Taipei) Lee Chia-hsin	20	10
(South Korea) Seo Seung-jae (South Korea) Kim Ha-na	22	21

=== Top half ===
==== Section 1 ====
First round
1	(South Korea) Choi S-g (South Korea) Chae Y-j	21	21
(Hong Kong) Ho W L (Hong Kong) Yuen S Y	11	14
(Chinese Taipei) Lu C-y (Chinese Taipei) Chiang K-h	21	21
(South Korea) Park K-h (South Korea) Kong H-y	12	14
8	(Chinese Taipei) Lin C-y (Chinese Taipei) Wu T-j	21	5	21
(South Korea) Choi H-g (South Korea) Yoo H-w	18	21	14
(Chinese Taipei) Tseng M-h (Chinese Taipei) Hu L-f	21	21
(Indonesia) M Muhammad (Indonesia) K N Hanadia	17	12

Second round
1	(South Korea) Choi S-g (South Korea) Chae Y-j	21	17	21
(Chinese Taipei) Lu C-y (Chinese Taipei) Chiang K-h	15	21	10
8	(Chinese Taipei) Lin C-y (Chinese Taipei) Wu T-j	18	15
(Chinese Taipei) Tseng M-h (Chinese Taipei) Hu L-f	21	21

Quarterfinals
1	(South Korea) Choi S-g (South Korea) Chae Y-j	21	21
(Chinese Taipei) Tseng M-h (Chinese Taipei) Hu L-f	13	14

==== Section 2 ====
First round
3	(Chinese Taipei) Wang C-l (Chinese Taipei) Lee C-h	21	21
(South Korea) Kim W-h (South Korea) Lee Y-r	16	14
(Chinese Taipei) Yang P-h (Chinese Taipei) Wen H-y	21	21
Q3	(South Korea) Kang M-h (South Korea) Baek H-n	19	12
5	(Malaysia) Goh S H (Malaysia) S J Lai	12	18
(Chinese Taipei) Lee Y (Chinese Taipei) Hsu Y-c	21	21
Q4	(Chinese Taipei) Liao K-h (Chinese Taipei) Yu C-h	18	13
(Singapore) D B Chrisnanta (Singapore) Crystal Wong J Y	21	21

Second round
3	(Chinese Taipei) Wang C-l (Chinese Taipei) Lee C-h	21	21
(Chinese Taipei) Yang P-h (Chinese Taipei) Wen H-y	12	16
(Chinese Taipei) Lee Y (Chinese Taipei) Hsu Y-c	21	17	19
(Singapore) D B Chrisnanta (Singapore) Crystal Wong J Y	17	21	21

Quarterfinals
3	(Chinese Taipei) Wang C-l (Chinese Taipei) Lee C-h	21	21
(Singapore) D B Chrisnanta (Singapore) Crystal Wong J Y	11	16

=== Bottom half ===
==== Section 3 ====
First round
(Chinese Taipei) Hsu J-t (Chinese Taipei) Lin W-c	21	21
(Hong Kong) Li K H (Hong Kong) Wu Yi T	12	19
(Japan) T Takashina (Japan) R Etoh	13	23	18
6	(Chinese Taipei) Liao M-c (Chinese Taipei) Chen H-h	21	21	21
(Indonesia) H Tandjaya (Indonesia) F Afni	8	17
(Chinese Taipei) Liang J-w (Chinese Taipei) Yang C-t	21	21
(Thailand) T Isriyanet (Thailand) P Chochuwong	21	21	21
4	(Chinese Taipei) Chang K-c (Chinese Taipei) Chang H-t	18	23	12

Second round
(Chinese Taipei) Hsu J-t (Chinese Taipei) Lin W-c	11	14
6	(Chinese Taipei) Liao M-c (Chinese Taipei) Chen H-h	21	21
(Chinese Taipei) Liang J-w (Chinese Taipei) Yang C-t	16	12
(Thailand) T Isriyanet (Thailand) P Chochuwong	21	21

Quarterfinals
6	(Chinese Taipei) Liao M-c (Chinese Taipei) Chen H-h	21	17	7
(Thailand) T Isriyanet (Thailand) P Chochuwong	13	21	21

==== Section 4 ====
First round
(South Korea) Lee H-s (South Korea) Kim H-r	18	12
Q1	(Chinese Taipei) Lee C-h (Chinese Taipei) Pai Y-p	21	21
(South Korea) Seo S-j (South Korea) Kim H-n	21	19	21
7	(Malaysia) Chan P S (Malaysia) Cheah Y S	12	21	18
Q2	(South Korea) Kim J-h (South Korea) Kim S-y	15	21	21
(Malaysia) Hoo P R (Malaysia) Peck Y W	21	15	17
(Indonesia) H Zulfauzi (Indonesia) D T Permatasari	10	12
2	(Singapore) Terry Hee Y K (Singapore) Tan W H	21	21

Second round
Q1	(Chinese Taipei) Lee C-h (Chinese Taipei) Pai Y-p	15	18
(South Korea) Seo S-j (South Korea) Kim H-n	21	21
Q2	(South Korea) Kim J-h (South Korea) Kim S-y	22	14	19
2	(Singapore) Terry Hee Y K (Singapore) Tan W H	20	21	21

Quarterfinals
(South Korea) Seo S-j (South Korea) Kim H-n	21	18	21
2	(Singapore) Terry Hee Y K (Singapore) Tan W H	18	21	18

Preceded by 2017 Thailand Open Grand Prix Gold	BWF Grand Prix Gold and Grand Prix; 2017 BWF Season	Succeeded by 2017 Canada Open Grand Prix
