= 2017 Vietnam Open Grand Prix =

Tournament details
- Dates: 4 – 10 September 2017
- Level: Grand Prix
- Total prize money: US$65,000
- Venue: Nguyen Du Stadium
- Location: Ho Chi Minh City, Vietnam

Champions
- Men's singles: (Thailand) Khosit Phetpradab
- Women's singles: (Japan) Sayaka Takahashi
- Men's doubles: (Indonesia) Wahyu Nayaka (Indonesia) Ade Yusuf
- Women's doubles: (Thailand) Chayanit Chaladchalam (Thailand) Phataimas Muenwong
- Mixed doubles: (Indonesia) Alfian Eko Prasetya (Indonesia) Melati Daeva Oktavianti

The 2017 Vietnam Open Grand Prix, officially Yonex Sunrise Vietnam Open 2017 was a badminton tournament which took place at the Nguyen Du Stadium in Ho Chi Minh City, Vietnam on 4–10 September 2017 and had a total purse of $65,000.

== Tournament ==
The 2017 Vietnam Open Grand Prix was the thirteenth Grand Prix's badminton tournament of the 2017 BWF Grand Prix Gold and Grand Prix and also part of the Vietnam Open championships which have been held since 1996. This tournament was organized by the Vietnam Badminton Federation, and presented by the Hochiminh City Badminton Association, with the sanctioned from the Badminton World Federation.

=== Venue ===
This international tournament was held at the Nguyen Du Cultural Sports Club in District 1, Ho Chi Minh City, Vietnam, and the practice venue at the Phu Tho Training Center in District 11.

=== Point distribution ===
Below is the tables with the point distribution for each phase of the tournament based on the BWF points system for the Grand Prix event.

Winner	Runner-up	3/4	5/8	9/16	17/32	33/64	65/128	129/256	257/512	513/1024
5,500	4,680	3,850	3,030	2,110	1,290	510	240	100	45	30

=== Prize money ===
The total prize money was US$65,000. Distribution of prize money was in accordance with BWF regulations.

Event	Winner	Finals	Semifinals	Quarterfinals	Last 16
Singles	$4,875	$2,470	$942.50	$390	$227.50
Doubles	$5,135	$2,470	$910	$471.25	$243.75

== Men's singles ==
=== Seeds ===
1. (Chinese Taipei) Hsu Jen-hao (third round)
2. (India) Sourabh Verma (withdrew)
3. (Thailand) Khosit Phetpradab (champion)
4. (Malaysia) Zulfadli Zulkiffli (first round)
5. (Malaysia) Chong Wei Feng (third round)
6. (Chinese Taipei) Lin Yu-hsien (second round)
7. (Indonesia) Ihsan Maulana Mustofa (second round)
8. (Malaysia) Daren Liew (quarterfinals)
9. (Vietnam) Nguyen Tien Minh (third round)
10. (Thailand) Suppanyu Avihingsanon (final)
11. (Chinese Taipei) Hsueh Hsuan-yi (first round)
12. (Thailand) Pannawit Thongnuam (first round)
13. (Malaysia) Goh Giap Chin (semifinals)
14. (Japan) Yu Igarashi (third round)
15. (India) Abhishek Yelegar (second round)
16. (Indonesia) Panji Ahmad Maulana (third round)

=== Finals ===
Quarterfinals
(Japan) Kodai Naraoka	21	21	21
(India) Lakshya Sen	17	23	10
3	(Thailand) Khosit Phetpradab	19	21	21
(Indonesia) Shesar Hiren Rhustavito	21	13	7
8	(Malaysia) Liew Daren	18	21	13
13	(Malaysia) Goh Giap Chin	21	13	21
Q4	(Thailand) Thammasin Sitthikom	21	19	16
10	(Thailand) Suppanyu Avihingsanon	10	21	21

Semifinals
(Japan) Kodai Naraoka	21	19	10
3	(Thailand) Khosit Phetpradab	12	21	21
13	(Malaysia) Goh Giap Chin	15	15
10	(Thailand) Suppanyu Avihingsanon	21	21

Final
3	(Thailand) Khosit Phetpradab	21	21
10	(Thailand) Suppanyu Avihingsanon	15	19

=== Top half ===
==== Section 1 ====
First round
1	(Chinese Taipei) Hsu J-h	21	21
(India) K. A Kumar	9	15
(Indonesia) N E Sulistyo	11	9
(India) R Y Chittaboina	21	21
11	(Chinese Taipei) Hsueh H-y	21	23	20
(Japan) K Naraoka	12	25	22
(Vietnam) Le D P	14	25	21
(Chinese Taipei) Chang E-c	21	23	14

Second round
1	(Chinese Taipei) Hsu J-h	10	21	21
(India) R Y Chittaboina	21	13	19
(Japan) K Naraoka	21	21
(Vietnam) Le D P	19	9

Third round
1	(Chinese Taipei) Hsu J-h	17	21	15
(Japan) K Naraoka	21	17	21

==== Section 2 ====
First round
7	(Indonesia) I M Mustofa	21	25
(Malaysia) Cheam J W	15	23
Q3	(Vietnam) Troung T L	21	21
(Thailand) S Jamsri	18	19
15	(India) A Yelegar	21	14	23
(Thailand) A Namkul	15	21	21
(India) L Sen	21	21
(Singapore) Chuang J L	9	4

Second round
7	(Indonesia) I M Mustofa	3^{r}
Q3	(Vietnam) Troung T L	2
15	(India) A Yelegar	17	10
(India) L Sen	21	21

Third round
Q3	(Vietnam) Troung T L	17	12
(India) L Sen	21	21

==== Section 3 ====
First round
3	(Thailand) K Phetpradab	23	16	21
(Malaysia) Lim C W	21	21	15
Q1	(Vietnam) Nguyen T L	9	13
(Chinese Taipei) Shih K-c	21	21
14	(Japan) Y Igarashi	21	21
(India) S Verma	11	19
(Indonesia) R Subagja	15	16
(Chinese Taipei) Chi Y-j	21	21

Second round
3	(Thailand) K Phetpradab	22	21
(Chinese Taipei) Shih K-c	20	11
14	(Japan) Y Igarashi	21	21
(Chinese Taipei) Chi Y-j	18	12

Third round
3	(Thailand) K Phetpradab	21	21
14	(Japan) Y Igarashi	19	15

==== Section 4 ====
First round
5	(Malaysia) Chong W F	21	21
Q7	(Chinese Taipei) Hung C-c	14	14
(Chinese Taipei) Lu C-h	21	21
(India) C. R Yadav	7	14
12	(Thailand) P Thongnuam	19	15
(Indonesia) S H Rhustavito	21	21
(Chinese Taipei) Chen C-w	16	18
(Malaysia) Chong Y H	21	21

Second round
5	(Malaysia) Chong W F	21	21
(Chinese Taipei) Lu C-h	18	8
(Indonesia) S H Rhustavito	21	21
(Malaysia) Chong Y H	19	7

Third round
5	(Malaysia) Chong W F	15	16
(Indonesia) S H Rhustavito	21	21

=== Bottom half ===
==== Section 5 ====
First round
PFQ	(Thailand) M Narongrit	23	21
(Malaysia) Soo T Z	21	13
(Indonesia) W Y Prasetyo	6	14
9	(Vietnam) Nguyen T M	21	21
(Uzbekistan) A Savatyugin	21	18	9
(India) N. V. S. Vijetha	16	21	21
PFQ	(Japan) N Yamazawa	19	20
8	(Malaysia) Liew D	21	22

Second round
PFQ	(Thailand) M Narongrit	14	16
9	(Vietnam) Nguyen T M	21	21
(India) N. V. S. Vijetha	17	14
8	(Malaysia) Liew D	21	21

Third round
9	(Vietnam) Nguyen T M	16	14
8	(Malaysia) Liew D	21	21

==== Section 6 ====
First round
(Japan) H Shimono	21	21
(Indonesia) D H Rumbaka	11	10
PFQ	(Chinese Taipei) Liu W-c	18	21	14
13	(Malaysia) Goh G C	21	13	21
(Thailand) N Singrueang	21	21
(Singapore) Ryan Ng Z R	19	14
(Chinese Taipei) Lin C-h	21	21
4	(Malaysia) Z Zulkiffli	18	12

Second round
(Japan) H Shimono	16	15
13	(Malaysia) Goh G C	21	21
(Thailand) N Singrueang	9	14
(Chinese Taipei) Lin C-h	21	21

Third round
13	(Malaysia) Goh G C	19	21	21
(Chinese Taipei) Lin C-h	21	17	16

==== Section 7 ====
First round
(Indonesia) F A Kholik	21	17
(India) P Joshi	23	21
Q8	(Thailand) N Nantatheero	16	15
16	(Indonesia) P A Maulana	21	21
Q4	(Thailand) T Sitthikom	21	21
(Thailand) K Vitidsarn	17	7
Q5	(Malaysia) M N A Fairuzly	12	14
6	(Chinese Taipei) Lin Y-h	21	21

Second round
(India) P Joshi	14	19
16	(Indonesia) P A Maulana	21	21
Q4	(Thailand) T Sitthikom	21	21
6	(Chinese Taipei) Lin Y-h	14	15

Third round
16	(Indonesia) P A Maulana	20	13
Q4	(Thailand) T Sitthikom	22	21

==== Section 8 ====
First round
(India) K G Kumar	21	21
(Brunei) Woon C Y	6	11
Q2	(Malaysia) Yeoh S Z	12	21	13
10	(Thailand) S Avihingsanon	21	11	21
(Thailand) K Wangcharoen	16	18
(Malaysia) Z Zulkiffli	21	21
Q6	(Chinese Taipei) Lai Y-h	21	21
PFQ	(Singapore) M E W Tan	7	14

Second round
(India) K G Kumar	15	17
10	(Thailand) S Avihingsanon	21	21
(Malaysia) Z Zulkiffli	10	18
Q6	(Chinese Taipei) Lai Y-h	21	21

Third round
10	(Thailand) S Avihingsanon	21	21
Q6	(Chinese Taipei) Lai Y-h	13	17

== Women's singles ==
=== Seeds ===
1. (Japan) Sayaka Takahashi (champion)
2. (Indonesia) Hanna Ramadini (semifinals)
3. (Indonesia) Dinar Dyah Ayustine (semifinals)
4. (Vietnam) Vu Thi Trang (final)
5. (Malaysia) Lee Ying Ying (first round)
6. (Chinese Taipei) Chen Su-yu (quarterfinals)
7. (Chinese Taipei) Pai Yu-po (quarterfinals)
8. (Chinese Taipei) Sung Shuo-yun (second round)

=== Finals ===
Semifinals
1	(Japan) Sayaka Takahashi	21	21
3	(Indonesia) Dinar Dyah Ayustine	12	7
4	(Vietnam) Vu Thi Trang	21	21
2	(Indonesia) Hanna Ramadini	18	17

Final
1	(Japan) Sayaka Takahashi	21	21
4	(Vietnam) Vu Thi Trang	9	14

=== Top half ===
==== Section 1 ====
First round
1	(Japan) S Takahashi	21	21
PFQ	(Malaysia) Yap Y	18	10
(Vietnam) Nguyen T L	21	21
(Singapore) Grace Chua H Z	15	14
6	(Chinese Taipei) Chen S-y	18	21	21
(Thailand) P Chaiwan	21	14	8
(Indonesia) J Muljati	9	15
PFQ	(India) V Gummadi	21	21

Second round
1	(Japan) S Takahashi	21	21
(Vietnam) Nguyen T L	14	11
6	(Chinese Taipei) Chen S-y	21	12	21
PFQ	(India) V Gummadi	8	21	10

Quarterfinals
1	(Japan) S Takahashi	21	21
6	(Chinese Taipei) Chen S-y	13	8

==== Section 2 ====
First round
3	(Indonesia) D D Ayustine	21	21
PFQ	(Malaysia) K Selvaduray	17	18
Q1	(India) S Pardeshi	24	21
(India) V Choudhari	22	17
5	(Malaysia) Lee Y Y	7	15
(Chinese Taipei) Tang W-y	21	21
(India) R S Gadde	21	21
(Belgium) L Tan	14	13

Second round
3	(Indonesia) D D Ayustine	21	16	23
Q1	(India) S Pardeshi	6	21	21
(Chinese Taipei) Tang W-y	15	12
(India) R S Gadde	21	21

Quarterfinals
3	(Indonesia) D D Ayustine	18	21	21
(India) R S Gadde	21	15	8

=== Bottom half ===
==== Section 3 ====
First round
Q3	(Chinese Taipei) Liang T-y	19	21	21
(Indonesia) R A Riodingin	21	15	19
Q4	(Vietnam) Dinh T P H	12	21
7	(Chinese Taipei) Pai Y-p	21	23
PFQ	(Thailand) S Suwannakitborihan	21	21
(India) T Lad	17	19
(Chinese Taipei) Hu L-f	13	15
4	(Vietnam) Vu T T	21	21

Second round
Q3	(Chinese Taipei) Liang T-y	18	12
7	(Chinese Taipei) Pai Y-p	21	21
PFQ	(Thailand) S Suwannakitborihan	16	18
4	(Vietnam) Vu T T	21	21

Quarterfinals
7	(Chinese Taipei) Pai Y-p	19	12
4	(Vietnam) Vu T T	21	21

==== Section 4 ====
First round
Q2	(Chinese Taipei) Chen H-h	21	21
(India) M Agrey	15	10
(Japan) S Saito	15	21	13
8	(Chinese Taipei) Sung S-y	21	18	21
(India) R Karthik	21	7	9
(Singapore) Yeo J M	8	21	21
(Malaysia) Ho Y M	23	22
2	(Indonesia) H Ramadini	25	24

Second round
Q2	(Chinese Taipei) Chen H-h	21	21
8	(Chinese Taipei) Sung S-y	11	18
(Singapore) Yeo J M	18	16
2	(Indonesia) H Ramadini	21	21

Quarterfinals
Q2	(Chinese Taipei) Chen H-h	21	17	10
2	(Indonesia) H Ramadini	14	21	21

== Men's doubles ==
=== Seeds ===
1. (Malaysia) Chooi Kah Ming / Low Juan Shen (second round)
2. (Indonesia) Mohammad Ahsan / Rian Agung Saputro (withdrew)
3. (Chinese Taipei) Liao Min-chun / Su Cheng-heng (final)
4. (Malaysia) Goh Sze Fei / Nur Izzuddin (withdrew)
5. (India) Arjun M.R. / Ramchandran Shlok (semifinals)
6. (Indonesia) Hendra Aprida Gunawan / Markis Kido (second round)
7. (Indonesia) Wahyu Nayaka / Ade Yusuf (champion)
8. (Vietnam) Do Tuan Duc / Pham Hong Nam (second round)

=== Finals ===
Semifinals
5	(India) Arjun Madathil Ramachandran (India) Shlok Ramchandran	11	21	19
3	(Chinese Taipei) Liao Min-chun (Chinese Taipei) Su Cheng-heng	21	17	21
7	(Indonesia) Wahyu Nayaka (Indonesia) Ade Yusuf	21	23	21
(Chinese Taipei) Lin Shang-kai (Chinese Taipei) Yang Po-hsuan	13	25	15

Final
3	(Chinese Taipei) Liao Min-chun (Chinese Taipei) Su Cheng-heng	21	16	21
7	(Indonesia) Wahyu Nayaka (Indonesia) Ade Yusuf	12	21	23

=== Top half ===
==== Section 1 ====
First round
1	(Malaysia) Chooi K H (Malaysia) Low J S	21	21
Q4	(Thailand) A Inkarat (Thailand) T Viriyangkura	17	18
(Thailand) T Isriyanet (Thailand) K Namdash	10	21	21
(Chinese Taipei) Liu W-c (Chinese Taipei) Tseng M-h	21	17	17
5	(India) Arjun M.R. (India) R Shlok	21	19	21
Q2	(India) A George (India) S Shukla	18	21	17
(Malaysia) Low H Y (Malaysia) Tan J H	21	21
(Chinese Taipei) Lu C-h (Chinese Taipei) Shih K-c	16	19

Second round
1	(Malaysia) Chooi K H (Malaysia) Low J S	16	22	15
(Thailand) T Isriyanet (Thailand) K Namdash	21	20	21
5	(India) Arjun M.R. (India) R Shlok	14	21	21
(Malaysia) Low H Y (Malaysia) Tan J H	21	12	12

Quarterfinals
(Thailand) T Isriyanet (Thailand) K Namdash	13	21	13
5	(India) Arjun M.R. (India) R Shlok	21	18	21

==== Section 2 ====
First round
3	(Chinese Taipei) Liao M-c (Chinese Taipei) Su C-h	21	21
(Malaysia) Lee J Y (Malaysia) Lim Z T	16	15
(Malaysia) M A Abdul Latif (Malaysia) J Singh	21	17	21
Q3	(Chinese Taipei) Chang K-c (Chinese Taipei) Chen X-y	19	21	16
6	(Indonesia) H A Gunawan (Indonesia) M Kido	21	19	21
(Japan) K Gondo (Japan) T Watanabe	13	21	12
(Indonesia) M Fachrikar (Indonesia) R Purnomo	21	21	11
(Vietnam) Bao M (Vietnam) Duong B D	23	19	7^{r}

Second round
3	(Chinese Taipei) Liao M-c (Chinese Taipei) Su C-h	17	21	21
(Malaysia) M A Abdul Latif (Malaysia) J Singh	21	14	15
6	(Indonesia) H A Gunawan (Indonesia) M Kido	19	16
(Indonesia) M Fachrikar (Indonesia) R Purnomo	21	21

Quarterfinals
3	(Chinese Taipei) Liao M-c (Chinese Taipei) Su C-h	21	21
(Indonesia) M Fachrikar (Indonesia) R Purnomo	13	15

=== Bottom half ===
==== Section 3 ====
First round
(Chinese Taipei) Po L-w (Chinese Taipei) Yang M-t	16	21	19
Q1	(Malaysia) Chen T J (Malaysia) Soh W Y	21	9	21
(Malaysia) N M A Ayub (Malaysia) Ooi Z H	17	22
7	(Indonesia) W Nayaka (Indonesia) A Yusuf	21	24
(Japan) H Okamura (Japan) M Onodera	21	21
(Thailand) A Chiengwong (Thailand) P Thongnuam	14	17
(Chinese Taipei) Lee F-c (Chinese Taipei) Lee F-j	21	21
PFQ	(Chinese Taipei) Chi Y-j (Chinese Taipei) Liu W-c	16	16

Second round
Q1	(Malaysia) Chen T J (Malaysia) Soh W Y	19	20
7	(Indonesia) W Nayaka (Indonesia) A Yusuf	21	22
(Japan) H Okamura (Japan) M Onodera	21	21
(Chinese Taipei) Lee F-c (Chinese Taipei) Lee F-j	19	14

Quarterfinals
7	(Indonesia) W Nayaka (Indonesia) A Yusuf	21	18	21
(Japan) H Okamura (Japan) M Onodera	16	21	12

==== Section 4 ====
First round
(Indonesia) A Adistia (Malaysia) Ian Wong J S	17	21	15
(Chinese Taipei) Lin S-k (Chinese Taipei) Yang P-h	21	17	21
(Japan) M Kaneko (Japan) Y Kubota	19	17
8	(Vietnam) Do T D (Vietnam) Pham H N	21	21
(Indonesia) D Juang (Indonesia) Y R Sugiarto	7	11
(Chinese Taipei) Lee C-h (Chinese Taipei) Lin C-y	21	21
(Malaysia) Shia C K (Malaysia) Tan W G	21	21
PFQ	(Malaysia) Chua C W (Indonesia) A P R Putra	11	5

Second round
(Chinese Taipei) Lin S-k (Chinese Taipei) Yang P-h	21	21
8	(Vietnam) Do T D (Vietnam) Pham H N	18	18
(Chinese Taipei) Lee C-h (Chinese Taipei) Lin C-y	13	18
(Malaysia) Shia C K (Malaysia) Tan W G	21	21

Quarterfinals
(Chinese Taipei) Lin S-k (Chinese Taipei) Yang P-h	21	21
(Malaysia) Shia C K (Malaysia) Tan W G	17	15

== Women's doubles ==
=== Seeds ===
1. (Malaysia) Chow Mei Kuan / Lee Meng Yean (semifinals)
2. (Chinese Taipei) Chiang Kai-Hsin / Hung Shih-han (first round)
3. (Chinese Taipei) Lin Xiao-min / Wu Fang-chien (first round)
4. (Japan) Chisato Hoshi / Naru Shinoya (quarterfinals)
5. (Thailand) Chayanit Chaladchalam / Phataimas Muenwong (champion)
6. (Japan) Misato Aratama / Akane Watanabe (quarterfinals)
7. (Indonesia) Della Destiara Haris / Rizki Amelia Pradipta (final)
8. (Indonesia) Anggia Shitta Awanda / Yulfira Barkah (semifinals)

=== Finals ===
Semifinals
1	(Malaysia) Chow Mei Kuan (Malaysia) Lee Meng Yean	7	17
7	(Indonesia) Della Destiara Haris (Indonesia) Rizki Amelia Pradipta	21	21
8	(Indonesia) Anggia Shitta Awanda (Indonesia) Yulfira Barkah	17	21	8
5	(Thailand) Chayanit Chaladchalam (Thailand) Phataimas Muenwong	21	17	21

Final
7	(Indonesia) Della Destiara Haris (Indonesia) Rizki Amelia Pradipta	16	19
5	(Thailand) Chayanit Chaladchalam (Thailand) Phataimas Muenwong	21	21

=== Top half ===
==== Section 1 ====
First round
1	(Malaysia) Chow M K (Malaysia) Lee M Y	21	21
PFQ	(India) S Ghorpade (India) P Sawant	10	14
(Chinese Taipei) Chen S-y (Chinese Taipei) Tang W-y	13	18
Q1	(Malaysia) Chin K M (Malaysia) Lee Z Q	21	21
6	(Japan) M Aratama (Japan) A Watanabe	21	21
(Thailand) K Dubthuk (Thailand) N Saengchote	15	15
(Indonesia) A M Khasanah (Indonesia) F A Putri	9	13
(Chinese Taipei) Chang C-h (Chinese Taipei) Yang C-t	21	21

Second round
1	(Malaysia) Chow M K (Malaysia) Lee M Y	21	21
Q1	(Malaysia) Chin K M (Malaysia) Lee Z Q	15	17
6	(Japan) M Aratama (Japan) A Watanabe	21	21
(Chinese Taipei) Chang C-h (Chinese Taipei) Yang C-t	19	14

Quarterfinals
1	(Malaysia) Chow M K (Malaysia) Lee M Y	17	21	21
6	(Japan) M Aratama (Japan) A Watanabe	21	15	14

==== Section 2 ====
First round
3	(Chinese Taipei) Lin X-m (Chinese Taipei) Wu F-c	13	18
(Vietnam) Nguyen T S (Vietnam) Vu T T	21	21
Q3	(Vietnam) Dinh T P H (Vietnam) Do T H	21	21
Q2	(Indonesia) M C Bandaso (Indonesia) M G Islami	18	18
7	(Indonesia) D D Haris (Indonesia) R A Pradipta	21	21
(Thailand) R Laisuan (Thailand) S Mingchua	14	11
(India) A Balan (India) Sruthi K.P	16	15
(Chinese Taipei) Chen H-h (Chinese Taipei) Hsieh P-s	21	21

Second round
(Vietnam) Nguyen T S (Vietnam) Vu T T	13	14
Q3	(Vietnam) Dinh T P H (Vietnam) Do T H	21	21
7	(Indonesia) D D Haris (Indonesia) R A Pradipta	21	21
(Chinese Taipei) Chen H-h (Chinese Taipei) Hsieh P-s	12	8

Quarterfinals
Q3	(Vietnam) Dinh T P H (Vietnam) Do T H	9	6
7	(Indonesia) D D Haris (Indonesia) R A Pradipta	21	21

=== Bottom half ===
==== Section 3 ====
First round
Q4	(Chinese Taipei) Kuo Y-w (Chinese Taipei) Lin W-c	21	23
(Chinese Taipei) Lee C-c (Chinese Taipei) Liang T-y	19	21
(Chinese Taipei) Hung Y-t (Chinese Taipei) Lin Y-c	7	19
8	(Indonesia) A S Awanda (Indonesia) Y Barkah	21	21
(Chinese Taipei) Cheng Y-c (Chinese Taipei) Hu L-f	21	21
(Thailand) P Chamnaktan (Thailand) T Wongya	17	16
(Chinese Taipei) Chang H-t (Chinese Taipei) Yu C-h	16	11
4	(Japan) C Hoshi (Japan) N Shinoya	21	21

Second round
Q4	(Chinese Taipei) Kuo Y-w (Chinese Taipei) Lin W-c	20	20
8	(Indonesia) A S Awanda (Indonesia) Y Barkah	22	22
(Chinese Taipei) Cheng Y-c (Chinese Taipei) Hu L-f	20	21	19
4	(Japan) C Hoshi (Japan) N Shinoya	22	17	21

Quarterfinals
8	(Indonesia) A S Awanda (Indonesia) Y Barkah	21	21
4	(Japan) C Hoshi (Japan) N Shinoya	18	15

==== Section 4 ====
First round
(India) S Gautam (India) A Prabhudesai	12	10
(Chinese Taipei) Wen H-y (Chinese Taipei) Ye J-y	21	21
(Indonesia) Z M R Permata (Indonesia) M Sandia	5	9
5	(Thailand) C Chaladchalam (Thailand) P Muenwong	21	21
(India) M Kukkapalli (India) A S Sunil	15	26	18
(Malaysia) Soong F C (Malaysia) Tee J Y	21	24	21
(Indonesia) N P Lestari (Indonesia) T R Nuraidah	21	21
2	(Chinese Taipei) Chiang K-h (Chinese Taipei) Hung S-h	18	19

Second round
(Chinese Taipei) Wen H-y (Chinese Taipei) Ye J-y	16	15
5	(Thailand) C Chaladchalam (Thailand) P Muenwong	21	21
(Malaysia) Soong F C (Malaysia) Tee J Y	19	21	21
(Indonesia) N P Lestari (Indonesia) T R Nuraidah	21	10	14

Quarterfinals
5	(Thailand) C Chaladchalam (Thailand) P Muenwong	15	21	21
(Malaysia) Soong F C (Malaysia) Tee J Y	21	18	19

== Mixed doubles ==
=== Seeds ===
1. (Chinese Taipei) Tseng Min-hao / Hu Ling-fang (quarterfinals)
2. (Chinese Taipei) Chang Ko-chi / Chang Hsin-tien (second round)
3. (Malaysia) Yogendran Khrishnan / (India) Prajakta Sawant (first round)
4. (Chinese Taipei) Liao Min-chun / Chen Hsiao-huan (quarterfinals)
5. (Malaysia) Chan Peng Soon / Cheah Yee See (semifinals)
6. (Indonesia) Alfian Eko Prasetya / Melati Daeva Oktavianti (champion)
7. (Indonesia) Yantoni Edy Saputra / Marsheilla Gischa Islami (first round)
8. (Indonesia) Ronald Alexander / Annisa Saufika (semifinals)

=== Finals ===
Semifinals
5	(Malaysia) Chan Peng Soon (Malaysia) Cheah Yee See	15	26
(Indonesia) Riky Widianto (Indonesia) Masita Mahmudin	21	28
8	(Indonesia) Ronald Alexander (Indonesia) Annisa Saufika	21	16	18
6	(Indonesia) Alfian Eko Prasetya (Indonesia) Melati Daeva Oktavianti	15	21	21

Final
(Indonesia) Riky Widianto (Indonesia) Masita Mahmudin	14	14
6	(Indonesia) Alfian Eko Prasetya (Indonesia) Melati Daeva Oktavianti	21	21

=== Top half ===
==== Section 1 ====
First round
1	(Chinese Taipei) Tseng M-h (Chinese Taipei) Hu L-f	21	18	21
(Indonesia) A Ramadiansyah (Indonesia) M C Bandaso	13	21	19
(Thailand) T Isriyanet (Thailand) P Chochuwong	12	19
(Chinese Taipei) Yang P-h (Chinese Taipei) Wen H-y	21	21
5	(Malaysia) Chan P S (Malaysia) Cheah Y S	21	21
(Chinese Taipei) Liu W-c (Chinese Taipei) Cheng Y-c	9	14
(Chinese Taipei) Po L-w (Chinese Taipei) Chang C-h	6	18
(Japan) H Okamura (Japan) N Shinoya	21	21

Second round
1	(Chinese Taipei) Tseng M-h (Chinese Taipei) Hu L-f	21	21
(Chinese Taipei) Yang P-h (Chinese Taipei) Wen H-y	18	17
5	(Malaysia) Chan P S (Malaysia) Cheah Y S	21	21
(Japan) H Okamura (Japan) N Shinoya	19	12

Quarterfinals
1	(Chinese Taipei) Tseng M-h (Chinese Taipei) Hu L-f	12	15
5	(Malaysia) Chan P S (Malaysia) Cheah Y S	21	21

==== Section 2 ====
First round
3	(Malaysia) K Yogendran (India) P Sawant	21	19	8
(Malaysia) Chen T J (Malaysia) Tew J J	16	21	21
(Chinese Taipei) Lee F-j (Chinese Taipei) Yu C-h	16	7
(Indonesia) R Widianto (Indonesia) M Mahmudin	21	21
7	(Indonesia) Y E Saputra (Indonesia) M G Islami	18	11
(Vietnam) Do T D (Vietnam) Pham N T	21	21
Q1	(Chinese Taipei) Yang M-t (Chinese Taipei) Sung S-y	13	23	21
(Chinese Taipei) Su C-h (Chinese Taipei) Lee C-c	21	21	14

Second round
(Malaysia) Chen T J (Malaysia) Tew J J	17	13
(Indonesia) R Widianto (Indonesia) M Mahmudin	21	21
(Vietnam) Do T D (Vietnam) Pham N T	13	9
Q1	(Chinese Taipei) Yang M-t (Chinese Taipei) Sung S-y	21	21

Quarterfinals
(Indonesia) R Widianto (Indonesia) M Mahmudin	19	21	21
Q1	(Chinese Taipei) Yang M-t (Chinese Taipei) Sung S-y	21	13	15

=== Bottom half ===
==== Section 3 ====
First round
(Malaysia) M A Abdul Latif (Indonesia) R A Riodingin	21	21
(Indonesia) A Dwiantoro (Indonesia) A M Khasanah	13	10
(Thailand) P Worasaktayanan (Thailand) R Laisuan	14	9
8	(Indonesia) R Alexander (Indonesia) A Saufika	21	21
(Vietnam) Pham H N (Vietnam) Le T H	13	22	13
(Chinese Taipei) Wu Y-c (Chinese Taipei) Yang C-t	21	20	21
Q2	(Chinese Taipei) Lee C-h (Chinese Taipei) Lin W-c	5	18
4	(Chinese Taipei) Liao M-c (Chinese Taipei) Chen H-h	21	21

Second round
(Malaysia) M A Abdul Latif (Indonesia) R A Riodingin	21	8	12
8	(Indonesia) R Alexander (Indonesia) A Saufika	18	21	21
(Chinese Taipei) Wu Y-c (Chinese Taipei) Yang C-t	15	19
4	(Chinese Taipei) Liao M-c (Chinese Taipei) Chen H-h	21	21

Quarterfinals
8	(Indonesia) R Alexander (Indonesia) A Saufika	15	23	21
4	(Chinese Taipei) Liao M-c (Chinese Taipei) Chen H-h	21	21	13

==== Section 4 ====
First round
(Thailand) P Thongnuam (Thailand) T Wongya	19	16
(Malaysia) Hoo P R (Malaysia) Peck Y W	21	21
Q3	(Chinese Taipei) Lin S-k (Chinese Taipei) Ye J-y	18	9
6	(Indonesia) A E Prasetya (Indonesia) M D Oktavianti	21	21
(Chinese Taipei) Lin C-y (Chinese Taipei) Kuo Y-w	16	21	23
(Thailand) C Charoenkitamorn (Thailand) R Iamratanamaetheekul	21	12	21
Q4	(Malaysia) Lee J Y (Malaysia) Lee Z Q	12	21	16
2	(Chinese Taipei) Chang K-c (Chinese Taipei) Chang H-t	21	14	21

Second round
(Malaysia) Hoo P R (Malaysia) Peck Y W	19	22	15
6	(Indonesia) A E Prasetya (Indonesia) M D Oktavianti	21	20	21
(Chinese Taipei) Lin C-y (Chinese Taipei) Kuo Y-w	21	21
2	(Chinese Taipei) Chang K-c (Chinese Taipei) Chang H-t	18	19

Quarterfinals
6	(Indonesia) A E Prasetya (Indonesia) M D Oktavianti	21	14	21
(Chinese Taipei) Lin C-y (Chinese Taipei) Kuo Y-w	9	21	18

Preceded by 2017 New Zealand Open Grand Prix Gold	BWF Grand Prix Gold and Grand Prix; 2017 BWF Season	Succeeded by 2017 Dutch Open Grand Prix
