= 2018 Korea Masters =

2018 badminton tournament in Gwangju

Tournament details
- Dates: 27 November – 2 December
- Level: Super 300
- Total prize money: US$250,000
- Venue: Gwangju Women's University Stadium
- Location: Gwangju, South Korea

Champions
- Men's singles: (South Korea) Son Wan-ho
- Women's singles: (China) Li Xuerui
- Men's doubles: (South Korea) Choi Sol-gyu (South Korea) Seo Seung-jae
- Women's doubles: (South Korea) Chang Ye-na (South Korea) Jung Kyung-eun
- Mixed doubles: (South Korea) Ko Sung-hyun (South Korea) Eom Hye-won

The 2018 Korea Masters (officially known as Victor Korea Masters 2018 for sponsorship reasons) was a badminton tournament which took place at Gwangju Women's University Stadium in South Korea from 27 November to 2 December 2018 and had a total prize of $250,000 (₩282,744,600).

== Tournament ==
The 2018 Korea Masters was the twenty-sixth and last tournament of the 2018 BWF World Tour before the 2018 BWF World Tour Finals. However, this tournament was not calculated in the rankings used as qualification for the World Tour Finals. It was part of the Korea Masters, which had been held since 2007. It was organized by the Badminton Korea Association and sanctioned by the BWF.

=== Venue ===
This tournament was held at the Gwangju Women's University Stadium in Gwangju, South Korea.

=== Point distribution ===
Below is the point distribution table for each phase of the tournament based on the BWF points system for the BWF World Tour Super 300 event.

Winner	Runner-up	3/4	5/8	9/16	17/32	33/64	65/128
7,000	5,950	4,900	3,850	2,750	1,670	660	320

=== Prize money ===
The total prize money for this year's tournament was US$250,000. Distribution of prize money was in accordance with BWF regulations.

Event	Winner	Finals	Semi-finals	Quarter-finals	Last 16
Singles	$18,750	$9,500	$3,625	$1,500	$875
Doubles	$19,750	$9,500	$3,500	$1,812.50	$937.50

== Men's singles ==
=== Seeds ===
1. (South Korea) Son Wan-ho (champion)
2. (Indonesia) Anthony Sinisuka Ginting (withdrew)
3. (Indonesia) Tommy Sugiarto (withdrew)
4. (Indonesia) Jonatan Christie (withdrew)
5. (Thailand) Khosit Phetpradab (second round)
6. (Thailand) Kantaphon Wangcharoen (withdrew)
7. (Thailand) Suppanyu Avihingsanon (first round)
8. (South Korea) Lee Dong-keun (second round)

=== Finals ===
Semi-finals
1	(South Korea) Son Wan-ho	21	21
(Hong Kong) Lee Cheuk Yiu	19	14
(Malaysia) Lee Zii Jia	4
(Thailand) Sitthikom Thammasin	1^{r}

Final
1	(South Korea) Son Wan-ho	21	21
(Malaysia) Lee Zii Jia	16	11

=== Top half ===
==== Section 1 ====
First round
1	(South Korea) Son W-h	21	21
(Indonesia) P A Maulana	15	11
(China) Lu GZ	21	7	11
Q3	(China) Ren PB	19	21	21
8	(South Korea) Lee D-k	21	13	21
(India) Parupalli K	17	21	8
Q1	(Chinese Taipei) Chen S-c	9	15
(Indonesia) I M Mustofa	21	21

Second round
1	(South Korea) Son W-h	21	19	21
Q3	(China) Ren PB	18	21	16
8	(South Korea) Lee D-k	15	18
(Indonesia) I M Mustofa	21	21

Quarter-finals
1	(South Korea) Son W-h	16	21	21
(Indonesia) I M Mustofa	21	17	13

==== Section 2 ====
First Round
PFQ	(Finland) E Heino	21	12	21
(India) S Verma	13	21	18
(China) Zhao JP	21	14	9
(Chinese Taipei) Lu C-h	14	21	21
7	(Thailand) S Avihingsanon	19	13
(Hong Kong) Lee C Y	21	21
(Thailand) T Saensomboonsuk	21	21
Q2	(Chinese Taipei) Chang E-c	18	16

Second Round
PFQ	(Finland) E Heino	17	16
(Chinese Taipei) Lu C-h	21	21
(Hong Kong) Lee C Y	21	21
(Thailand) T Saensomboonsuk	12	18

Quarter-finals
(Chinese Taipei) Lu C-h	11	13
(Hong Kong) Lee C Y	21	21

=== Bottom half ===
==== Section 3 ====
First round
(Malaysia) Lee Z J	23	22
(Chinese Taipei) Lin Y-h	21	20
PFQ	(Chinese Taipei) Yang C-c	18	21	21
PFQ	(Czech Republic) M Ludik	21	16	13
(Indonesia) S H Rhustavito	21	16	21
PFQ	(China) Zhou ZQ	12	21	17
(South Korea) Heo K-h	15	12
PFQ	(Indonesia) C A Dwi Wardoyo	21	21

Second round
(Malaysia) Lee Z J	21	21
PFQ	(Chinese Taipei) Yang C-c	18	15
(Indonesia) S H Rhustavito	21	21
PFQ	(Indonesia) C A Dwi Wardoyo	19	14

Quarter-finals
(Malaysia) Lee Z J	21	21
(Indonesia) S H Rhustavito	14	13

==== Section 4 ====
First Round
(Malaysia) Soong J V	18	21	21
Q4	(South Korea) Ha Y-w	21	12	14
(Chinese Taipei) Hsu J-h	15	9
5	(Thailand) K Phetpradab	21	21
(Thailand) S Thammasin	21	13	21
(Indonesia) F A Kholik	16	21	12
(Israel) M Zilberman	21	22
PFQ	(Canada) Sheng XD	18	20

Second Round
(Malaysia) Soong J V	21	21
5	(Thailand) K Phetpradab	11	11
(Thailand) S Thammasin	21	17	21
(Israel) M Zilberman	10	21	13

Quarter-finals
(Malaysia) Soong J V	16	21	15
(Thailand) S Thammasin	21	16	21

== Women's singles ==
=== Seeds ===
1. (Thailand) Ratchanok Intanon (withdrew)
2. (South Korea) Sung Ji-hyun (second round)
3. (Thailand) Nitchaon Jindapol (quarter-finals)
4. (Indonesia) Gregoria Mariska Tunjung (first round)
5. (Thailand) Pornpawee Chochuwong (withdrew)
6. (Thailand) Busanan Ongbamrungphan (second round)
7. (Malaysia) Goh Jin Wei (semi-finals)
8. (China) Han Yue (final)

=== Finals ===
Semi-finals
7	(Malaysia) Goh Jin Wei	21	21	14
(China) Li Xuerui	23	10	21
8	(China) Han Yue	19	21	21
(South Korea) Kim Hyo-min	21	13	9

Final
(China) Li Xuerui	21	21
8	(China) Han Yue	10	18

=== Top half ===
==== Section 1 ====
First round
PFQ	(United States) L Lam	12	21	19
(Chinese Taipei) Chiang Y-l	21	17	21
(Canada) B Tam	21	21
(United States) C Pan	14	14
7	(Malaysia) Goh J W	21	21
(Netherlands) S de Visch Eijbergen	7	13
(United States) I Zhong	21	21	13
(China) Zhang YM	23	16	21

Second round
(Chinese Taipei) Chiang Y-l	21	21
(Canada) B Tam	19	14
7	(Malaysia) Goh J W	21	21
(China) Zhang YM	16	15

Quarter-finals
(Chinese Taipei) Chiang Y-l	9	6
7	(Malaysia) Goh J W	21	21

==== Section 2 ====
First Round
4	(Indonesia) G M Tunjung	19	21	13
(China) Li XR	21	13	21
Q3	(Chinese Taipei) Hung Y-t	21	21
(United States) D Gupta	13	11
6	(Thailand) B Ongbamrungphan	21	21
(Chinese Taipei) Liang T-y	15	10
(Indonesia) Fitriani	21	21
(South Korea) Lee S-y	15	10

Second Round
(China) Li XR	21	21
Q3	(Chinese Taipei) Hung Y-t	12	19
6	(Thailand) B Ongbamrungphan	18	21	11
(Indonesia) Fitriani	21	12	21

Quarter-finals
(China) Li XR	21	21
(Indonesia) Fitriani	14	12

=== Bottom half ===
==== Section 3 ====
First round
(Thailand) N Aimsaard	21	17	10
(Chinese Taipei) Lin Y-c	14	21	21
Q4	(South Korea) Lee B-l	17	14
8	(China) Han Y	21	21
Q1	(South Korea) Bae J-w	20	18
(Indonesia) L A Mainaky	22	21
(South Korea) Jeon J-i	21	15	12
3	(Thailand) N Jindapol	17	21	21

Second round
(Chinese Taipei) Lin Y-c	15	17
8	(China) Han Y	21	21
(Indonesia) L A Mainaky	10	15
3	(Thailand) N Jindapol	21	21

Quarter-finals
8	(China) Han Y	15	21	22
3	(Thailand) N Jindapol	21	4	20

==== Section 4 ====
First Round
PFQ	(South Korea) Sim Y-j	21	21
(Chinese Taipei) Sung S-y	12	11
(South Korea) Kim H-m	21	21
PFQ	(Indonesia) R A Riodingin	12	10
(South Korea) Kim G-e	21	21
(Chinese Taipei) Chen S-y	9	10
Q2	(South Korea) An S-y	16	21	10
2	(South Korea) Sung J-h	21	12	21

Second Round
(South Korea) Sim Y-j	13	21	8
(South Korea) Kim H-m	21	16	21
(South Korea) Kim G-e	21	21
2	(South Korea) Sung J-h	19	17

Quarter-finals
(South Korea) Kim H-m	21	0
(South Korea) Kim G-e	15	0^{r}

== Men's doubles ==
=== Seeds ===
1. (Indonesia) Fajar Alfian / Muhammad Rian Ardianto (first round)
2. (China) Han Chengkai / Zhou Haodong (withdrew)
3. (Malaysia) Goh V Shem / Tan Wee Kiong (second round)
4. (Indonesia) Mohammad Ahsan / Hendra Setiawan (withdrew)
5. (Indonesia) Berry Angriawan / Hardianto (quarter-finals)
6. (Malaysia) Aaron Chia / Soh Wooi Yik (quarter-finals)
7. (Chinese Taipei) Lu Ching-yao / Yang Po-han (semi-finals)
8. (Chinese Taipei) Po Li-wei / Wang Chi-lin (final)

=== Finals ===
Semi-finals
(South Korea) Kim Sa-rang (Malaysia) Tan Boon Heong	18	21	17
8	(Chinese Taipei) Po Li-wei (Chinese Taipei) Wang Chi-lin	21	12	21
7	(Chinese Taipei) Lu Ching-yao (Chinese Taipei) Yang Po-han	21	11	14
(South Korea) Choi Sol-gyu (South Korea) Seo Seung-jae	14	21	21

Final
8	(Chinese Taipei) Po Li-wei (Chinese Taipei) Wang Chi-lin	12	21	18
(South Korea) Choi Sol-gyu (South Korea) Seo Seung-jae	21	17	21

=== Top half ===
==== Section 1 ====
First round
1	(Indonesia) F Alfian (Indonesia) M R Ardianto	13	21	12
(South Korea) Kim S-r (Malaysia) Tan B H	21	18	21
(South Korea) Bae K-y (South Korea) Choi J-w	21	16	18
(Malaysia) M Arif A L (Malaysia) N M Azriyn A	15	21	21
5	(Indonesia) B Angriawan (Indonesia) Hardianto	21	21
(South Korea) Chung E-s (South Korea) Kim D-y	15	12
(Chinese Taipei) Lin S-k (Chinese Taipei) Tseng M-h	21	21
PFQ	(South Korea) Park M-h (South Korea) Yim J-k	14	14

Second round
(South Korea) Kim S-r (Malaysia) Tan B H	21	22	21
(Malaysia) M Arif A L (Malaysia) N M Azriyn A	19	24	17
5	(Indonesia) B Angriawan (Indonesia) Hardianto	22	21
(Chinese Taipei) Lin S-k (Chinese Taipei) Tseng M-h	20	15

Quarter-finals
(South Korea) Kim S-r (Malaysia) Tan B H	21	21
5	(Indonesia) B Angriawan (Indonesia) Hardianto	16	17

==== Section 2 ====
First Round
3	(Malaysia) Goh V S (Malaysia) Tan W K	21	24
(Chinese Taipei) Lee S-m (Chinese Taipei) Yang P-h	19	22
(South Korea) Ahn J-h (South Korea) Lim J-s	21	14	14
PFQ	(China) Huang KX (China) Wang ZK	19	21	21
8	(Chinese Taipei) Po L-w (Chinese Taipei) Wang C-l	21	21
Q1	(South Korea) Han Y-s (South Korea) Kim J-h	18	13
(Indonesia) S K Gutama (Indonesia) F W Putra	21	28
(Hong Kong) Lee C H (Hong Kong) Tan C H	16	26

Second Round
3	(Malaysia) Goh V S (Malaysia) Tan W K	17	16
PFQ	(China) Huang KX (China) Wang ZK	21	21
8	(Chinese Taipei) Po L-w (Chinese Taipei) Wang C-l	21	14	21
(Indonesia) S K Gutama (Indonesia) F W Putra	17	21	16

Quarter-finals
PFQ	(China) Huang KX (China) Wang ZK	21	20	14
8	(Chinese Taipei) Po L-w (Chinese Taipei) Wang C-l	16	22	21

=== Bottom half ===
==== Section 3 ====
First round
Q2	(South Korea) Choi H-g (South Korea) Jung T-i	21	16	19
(Chinese Taipei) Lee F-c (Chinese Taipei) Lee F-j	17	21	21
(South Korea) Kang M-h (South Korea) Kim W-h	16	15
7	(Chinese Taipei) Lu C-y (Chinese Taipei) Yang P-h	21	21
(South Korea) Ko S-h (South Korea) Shin B-c	25	21
Q4	(South Korea) Kim Y-h (South Korea) Na S-s	23	11
(Chinese Taipei) Chang K-c (Chinese Taipei) Lu C-p	19	12
PFQ	(South Korea) Jang S-h (South Korea) Kim D-j	21	21

Second round
(Chinese Taipei) Lee F-c (Chinese Taipei) Lee F-j	21	18	14
7	(Chinese Taipei) Lu C-y (Chinese Taipei) Yang P-h	16	21	21
(South Korea) Ko S-h (South Korea) Shin B-c	21	22	12
PFQ	(South Korea) Jang S-h (South Korea) Kim D-j	19	24	21

Quarter-finals
7	(Chinese Taipei) Lu C-y (Chinese Taipei) Yang P-h	21	21
PFQ	(South Korea) Jang S-h (South Korea) Kim D-j	12	17

==== Section 4 ====
First Round
Q3	(South Korea) Jung J-w (South Korea) Kim H-t	19	21	22
(Malaysia) Chooi K M (Malaysia) Low J S	21	18	20
(South Korea) Jung J-y (South Korea) Kim D-e	13	21	19
6	(Malaysia) A Chia (Malaysia) Soh W Y	21	18	21
(Indonesia) A B Cahyono (Indonesia) M R P Isfahani	21	19	18
(South Korea) Choi S-g (South Korea) Seo S-j	19	21	21
(Australia) S Leung W H (Australia) M Wheller	12	9
PFQ	(Malaysia) Chen T J (Malaysia) Man W C	21	21

Second Round
Q3	(South Korea) Jung J-w (South Korea) Kim H-t	17	19
6	(Malaysia) A Chia (Malaysia) Soh W Y	21	21
(South Korea) Choi S-g (South Korea) Seo S-j	21	21
PFQ	(Malaysia) Chen T J (Malaysia) Man W C	11	19

Quarter-finals
6	(Malaysia) A Chia (Malaysia) Soh W Y	21	19	18
(South Korea) Choi S-g (South Korea) Seo S-j	17	21	21

== Women's doubles ==
=== Seeds ===
1. (Thailand) Jongkolphan Kititharakul / Rawinda Prajongjai (withdrew)
2. (South Korea) Lee So-hee / Shin Seung-chan (final)
3. (South Korea) Chang Ye-na / Jung Kyung-eun (champions)
4. (Thailand) Chayanit Chaladchalam / Phataimas Muenwong (quarter-finals)
5. (South Korea) Baek Ha-na / Kim Hye-rin (semi-finals)
6. (Hong Kong) Ng Tsz Yau / Yuen Sin Ying (first round)
7. (Chinese Taipei) Hsu Ya-ching / Hu Ling-fang (second round)
8. (South Korea) Kim Hye-jeong / Kong Hee-yong (quarter-finals)

=== Finals ===
Semi-finals
(Indonesia) Yulfira Barkah (Indonesia) Jauza Fadhila Sugiarto	10	16
3	(South Korea) Chang Ye-na (South Korea) Jung Kyung-eun	21	21
5	(South Korea) Baek Ha-na (South Korea) Kim Hye-rin	4	24	7
2	(South Korea) Lee So-hee (South Korea) Shin Seung-chan	21	22	21

Final
3	(South Korea) Chang Ye-na (South Korea) Jung Kyung-eun	21	21
2	(South Korea) Lee So-hee (South Korea) Shin Seung-chan	14	17

=== Top half ===
==== Section 1 ====
First round
PFQ	(Indonesia) L A Mainaky (Indonesia) R A Riodingin	14	22
(South Korea) Lee D-b (South Korea) Park Y-s	21	24
(Chinese Taipei) Chang H-t (Chinese Taipei) Cheng C-y	18	20
Q3	(South Korea) Go A-r (South Korea) Yoo C-r	21	22
7	(Chinese Taipei) Hsu Y-c (Chinese Taipei) Hu L-f	21	14	21
(Indonesia) T O Kusumah (Indonesia) V A Sukoco	14	21	14
(Indonesia) Y Barkah (Indonesia) J F Sugiarto	21	21
(Chinese Taipei) Lin W-c (Chinese Taipei) Wu T-j	12	15

Second round
(South Korea) Lee D-b (South Korea) Park Y-s	10	8
Q3	(South Korea) Go A-r (South Korea) Yoo C-r	21	21
7	(Chinese Taipei) Hsu Y-c (Chinese Taipei) Hu L-f	21	13	14
(Indonesia) Y Barkah (Indonesia) J F Sugiarto	19	21	21

Quarter-finals
Q3	(South Korea) Go A-r (South Korea) Yoo C-r	15	17
(Indonesia) Y Barkah (Indonesia) J F Sugiarto	21	21

==== Section 2 ====
First Round
3	(South Korea) Chang Y-n (South Korea) Jung K-e	21	21
(Chinese Taipei) Li Z-q (Chinese Taipei) Teng C-h	16	18
(Chinese Taipei) Cheng Y-p (Chinese Taipei) Lin J-y	6	5
Q2	(South Korea) Choi H-i (South Korea) Kim M-j	21	21
6	(Hong Kong) Ng T Y (Hong Kong) Yuen S Y	19	11
(South Korea) Mok H-m (South Korea) Seong A-y	21	21
(Chinese Taipei) Chang C-h (Chinese Taipei) Yang C-t	22	21	16
(South Korea) Kang C-h (Germany) O Konon	24	12	21

Second Round
3	(South Korea) Chang Y-n (South Korea) Jung K-e	21	21
Q2	(South Korea) Choi H-i (South Korea) Kim M-j	7	17
(South Korea) Mok H-m (South Korea) Seong A-y	21	21
(South Korea) Kang C-h (Germany) O Konon	13	17

Quarter-finals
3	(South Korea) Chang Y-n (South Korea) Jung K-e	21	21
(South Korea) Mok H-m (South Korea) Seong A-y	17	4

=== Bottom half ===
==== Section 3 ====
First round
Q4	(South Korea) An S-y (South Korea) Jeong N-e	21	21
(United States) E Kan (United States) I Zhong	7	9
Q1	(South Korea) Eom H-w (South Korea) Ko H-r	13	21	16
5	(South Korea) Baek H-n (South Korea) Kim H-r	21	12	21
(Chinese Taipei) Hung Y-t (Chinese Taipei) Sung S-y	15	21	15
(Thailand) B Aimsaard (Thailand) N Aimsaard	21	12	21
(Japan) N Someya (Japan) A Uesugi	18	16
4	(Thailand) C Chaladchalam (Thailand) P Muenwong	21	21

Second round
Q4	(South Korea) An S-y (South Korea) Jeong N-e	13	19
5	(South Korea) Baek H-n (South Korea) Kim H-r	21	21
(Thailand) B Aimsaard (Thailand) N Aimsaard	15	14
4	(Thailand) C Chaladchalam (Thailand) P Muenwong	21	21

Quarter-finals
5	(South Korea) Baek H-n (South Korea) Kim H-r	21	21
4	(Thailand) C Chaladchalam (Thailand) P Muenwong	13	18

==== Section 4 ====
First Round
(Indonesia) N K M Istarani (Indonesia) V Putri	21	21
(Chinese Taipei) Hung S-h (Chinese Taipei) Yu C-h	18	17
(China) Dong WJ (China) Feng XY	14	14
8	(South Korea) Kim H-j (South Korea) Kong H-y	21	21
(South Korea) Ji J-b (South Korea) Lee Y-n	2^{r}
(China) Chen L (China) Xu Y	6
(Chinese Taipei) Kuo Y-w (Chinese Taipei) Lin Y-c	10	16
2	(South Korea) Lee S-h (South Korea) Shin S-c	21	21

Second Round
(Indonesia) N K M Istarani (Indonesia) V Putri	17	19
8	(South Korea) Kim H-j (South Korea) Kong H-y	21	21
(China) Chen L (China) Xu Y	14	21
2	(South Korea) Lee S-h (South Korea) Shin S-c	21	23

Quarter-finals
8	(South Korea) Kim H-j (South Korea) Kong H-y	18	18
2	(South Korea) Lee S-h (South Korea) Shin S-c	21	21

== Mixed doubles ==
=== Seeds ===
1. (Indonesia) Praveen Jordan / Melati Daeva Oktavianti (semi-finals)
2. (South Korea) Seo Seung-jae / Chae Yoo-jung (withdrew)
3. (Malaysia) Chen Tang Jie / Peck Yen Wei (second round)
4. (Indonesia) Rinov Rivaldy / Pitha Haningtyas Mentari (second round)
5. (Indonesia) Alfian Eko Prasetya / Marsheilla Gischa Islami (first round)
6. (China) Lu Kai / Chen Lu (quarter-finals)
7. (Indonesia) Tontowi Ahmad / Della Destiara Haris (withdrew)
8. (Indonesia) Akbar Bintang Cahyono / Winny Oktavina Kandow (quarter-finals)

=== Finals ===
Semi-finals
1	(Indonesia) Praveen Jordan (Indonesia) Melati Daeva Oktavianti	20	21	17
(South Korea) Choi Sol-gyu (South Korea) Shin Seung-chan	22	18	21
Q2	(South Korea) Ko Sung-hyun (South Korea) Eom Hye-won	20	21	21
(Hong Kong) Mak Hee Chun (Hong Kong) Chau Hoi Wah	22	11	10

Final
(South Korea) Choi Sol-gyu (South Korea) Shin Seung-chan	12	21	18
Q2	(South Korea) Ko Sung-hyun (South Korea) Eom Hye-won	21	15	21

=== Top half ===
==== Section 1 ====
First round
1	(Indonesia) P Jordan (Indonesia) M D Oktavianti	21	21
(Chinese Taipei) Chang K-c (Chinese Taipei) Cheng C-y	17	14
(Chinese Taipei) Lee F-c (Chinese Taipei) Sung S-y	21	19	21
PFQ	(Chinese Taipei) Lin S-k (Chinese Taipei) Cheng Y-p	10	21	18
5	(Indonesia) A E Prasetya (Indonesia) M G Islami	21	20	15
Q4	(South Korea) Kim W-h (South Korea) Baek H-n	19	22	21
(China) Ou XY (China) Feng XY	21	21
(Chinese Taipei) Wang C-l (Chinese Taipei) Chang H-t	9	18

Second round
1	(Indonesia) P Jordan (Indonesia) M D Oktavianti	21	21
(Chinese Taipei) Lee F-c (Chinese Taipei) Sung S-y	15	8
Q4	(South Korea) Kim W-h (South Korea) Baek H-n	21	24
(China) Ou XY (China) Feng XY	18	22

Quarter-finals
1	(Indonesia) P Jordan (Indonesia) M D Oktavianti	19	21	21
Q4	(South Korea) Kim W-h (South Korea) Baek H-n	21	17	18

==== Section 2 ====
First Round
3	(Malaysia) Chen T J (Malaysia) Peck Y W	21	21
(South Korea) Bae K-y (South Korea) Go A-r	16	18
(Chinese Taipei) Lee F-j (Chinese Taipei) Yu C-h	14	16
(South Korea) Choi S-g (South Korea) Shin S-c	21	21
6	(China) Lu K (China) Chen L	21	13	21
(Hong Kong) Lee C H (Hong Kong) Ng T Y	15	21	13
(South Korea) Kim H-t (South Korea) Kim H-j	9	22	11
(Chinese Taipei) Yang P-h (Chinese Taipei) Wu T-j	21	20	21

Second Round
3	(Malaysia) Chen T J (Malaysia) Peck Y W	19	11
(South Korea) Choi S-g (South Korea) Shin S-c	21	21
6	(China) Lu K (China) Chen L	21	21
(Chinese Taipei) Yang P-h (Chinese Taipei) Wu T-j	16	10

Quarter-finals
(South Korea) Choi S-g (South Korea) Shin S-c	21	21
6	(China) Lu K (China) Chen L	8	14

=== Bottom half ===
==== Section 3 ====
First round
Q1	(South Korea) Kim D-y (South Korea) Chang Y-n	21	21
(Malaysia) Hoo P R (Malaysia) Cheah Y S	18	8
Q3	(South Korea) Park B-h (South Korea) Kim S-y	17	13
8	(Indonesia) A B Cahyono (Indonesia) W O Kandow	21	21
(Hong Kong) Tam C H (Hong Kong) Yuen S Y	15	8
Q2	(South Korea) Ko S-h (South Korea) Eom H-w	21	21
(Chinese Taipei) Po L-w (Chinese Taipei) Chang C-h	19	16
4	(Indonesia) R Rivaldy (Indonesia) P H Mentari	21	21

Second round
Q1	(South Korea) Kim D-y (South Korea) Chang Y-n	23	19
8	(Indonesia) A B Cahyono (Indonesia) W O Kandow	25	21
Q2	(South Korea) Ko S-h (South Korea) Eom H-w	13	21	21
4	(Indonesia) R Rivaldy (Indonesia) P H Mentari	21	16	13

Quarter-finals
8	(Indonesia) A B Cahyono (Indonesia) W O Kandow	15	16
Q2	(South Korea) Ko S-h (South Korea) Eom H-w	21	21

==== Section 4 ====
First Round
(United States) M Fogarty (United States) I Zhong	9	16
(Malaysia) M Arif A L (Indonesia) R A Riodingin	21	21
(Chinese Taipei) Tseng M-h (Chinese Taipei) Lin J-y	14	21	21
PFQ	(Chinese Taipei) Lu C-p (Chinese Taipei) Yang C-t	21	17	12
(Hong Kong) Mak H C (Hong Kong) Chau H W	21	18	21
(China) Dong WJ (China) Dong WJ	16	21	18
(Israel) M Zilberman (Israel) S Zilberman	w	/	o
2	(South Korea) Seo S-j (South Korea) Chae Y-j

Second Round
(Malaysia) M Arif A L (Indonesia) R A Riodingin	15	21	17
(Chinese Taipei) Tseng M-h (Chinese Taipei) Lin J-y	21	19	21
(Hong Kong) Mak H C (Hong Kong) Chau H W	21	21
(Israel) M Zilberman (Israel) S Zilberman	13	8

Quarter-finals
(Chinese Taipei) Tseng M-h (Chinese Taipei) Lin J-y	16	21	21
(Hong Kong) Mak H C (Hong Kong) Chau H W	21	17	23

Preceded by 2018 Scottish Open	BWF World Tour; 2018 BWF season	Succeeded by 2018 BWF World Tour Finals
