= 2015 BWF World Junior Championships – Boys singles =

2015 BWF World Junior Championships – Boys' Singles
Tournament details
- Dates: 10–15 November 2015
- Edition: 17th
- Level: International
- Venue: Centro de Alto Rendimiento “La Videna”
- Location: Lima

The Boys' Singles tournament of the 2015 BWF World Junior Championships is held on November 10–15. The defending champion of the last edition is Lin Guipu from China.

== Seeded ==
1. (Indonesia) Firman Abdul Kholik (Quarterfinals)
2. (Malaysia) Cheam June Wei (3rd round)
3. (Denmark) Anders Antonsen (4th round)
4. (China) Lin Guipu (Quarterfinals)
5. (Thailand) Kantawat Leelavechabutr (4th round)
6. (Chinese Taipei) Lu Chia-hung (Champion)
7. (France) Toma Junior Popov (3rd round)
8. (Austria) Wolfgang Gnedt (3rd round)
9. (Thailand) Kantaphon Wangcharoen (3rd round)
10. (Malaysia) Satheishtharan Ramachandran (Quarterfinals)
11. (France) Vincent Medina (4th round)
12. (Slovenia) Miha Ivanic (2nd round)
13. (Singapore) Loh Kean Yew (Quarterfinals)
14. (Thailand) Adulrach Namkul (Semifinals)
15. (India) Chirag Sen (4th round)
16. (Turkey) Melih Turgut (2nd round)

== Draw ==
=== Finals ===
Quarterfinals
1	(Indonesia) Firman Abdul Kholik	15	7
14	(Thailand) Adulrach Namkul	21	21
(India) Siril Verma	21	21
10	(Malaysia) Satheishtharan Ramachandran	15	14
6	(Chinese Taipei) Lu Chia-hung	19	21	21
4	(China) Lin Guipu	21	10	18
13	(Singapore) Loh Kean Yew	22	17
(Japan) Koki Watanabe	24	21

Semifinals
14	(Thailand) Adulrach Namkul	14	15
(India) Siril Verma	21	21
6	(Chinese Taipei) Lu Chia-hung	21	21
(Japan) Koki Watanabe	18	12

Final
(India) Siril Verma	21	10	7
6	(Chinese Taipei) Lu Chia-hung	17	21	21

=== Top half ===
==== Section 1 ====
First round
(Guyana) R Chang Yuen	4	7
(Slovenia) M Cerkovnik	21	21
(Turkey) Ö Altinkopru	14	15
(Thailand) P Nipornram	21	21
(South Africa) R Snyman	10	10
(Switzerland) B Schaller	21	21
(Australia) D Lee	9	7
(Sweden) V Aglinder	21	21
(Spain) M Brea	20	13
(Italy) L Osele	22	21
(Costa Rica) G Cavallotti	6	5
(Malaysia) Yeoh S Z	21	21

Second round
1	(Indonesia) F A Kholik	21	21
(Slovenia) M Cerkovnik	11	9
(Thailand) P Nipornram	21	21
(Switzerland) B Schaller	14	10
16	(Turkey) M Turgut	17	21	10
(Sweden) V Aglinder	21	15	21
(Italy) L Osele	8	10
(Malaysia) Yeoh S Z	21	21

Third round
1	(Indonesia) F A Kholik	21	21
(Thailand) P Nipornram	5	15
(Sweden) V Aglinder	17	9
(Malaysia) Yeoh S Z	21	21

Fourth round
1	(Indonesia) F A Kholik	21	21
(Malaysia) Yeoh S Z	14	17

==== Section 2 ====
First round
(Colombia) K Nupan	21	17	16
(South Africa) B Nel	18	21	21
(Macau) Pui P F	7	6
(Chinese Taipei) Chen C-w	21	21
(China) Ye BH	21	21
(Germany) J C Völker	17	14
14	(Thailand) A Namkul	21	21
(Netherlands) J Kweekel	13	14
(Iceland) P Gudfinnsson	21	21
(Dominican Republic) C A Brito	17	15
(Singapore) R Ng	26	21
(Canada) C Chow	24	14
(Slovenia) A Krapez	23	21
(Peru) D La Torre	21	13

Second round
8	(Austria) W Gnedt	21	21
(South Africa) B Nel	5	3
(Chinese Taipei) Chen C-w	13	11
(China) Ye BH	21	21
14	(Thailand) A Namkul	21	21
(Iceland) P Gudfinnsson	9	8
(Singapore) R Ng
(Slovenia) A Krapez	w	/	o

Third round
8	(Austria) W Gnedt	10	7
(China) Ye BH	21	21
14	(Thailand) A Namkul	21	21
(Slovenia) A Krapez	16	13

Fourth round
(China) Ye BH	10	21	21
14	(Thailand) A Namkul	21	18	23

==== Section 3 ====
First round
(South Korea) Kang W-h	21	20	16
(England) D King	15	22	21
(South Korea) Kim H-j	7	15
(Hong Kong) Chan Y C	21	21
(Hungary) B Szenjai	13	19
(Italy) F Caponio	21	21
9	(Thailand) K Wangcharoen	21	21
(Chile) D Castillo	5	4
(Guatemala) C A Martinez	12	13
(Malaysia) Lee Z J	21	21
(Netherlands) N Veenstra	7	9
(India) S Verma	21	21
(France) T Baures	21	21
(El Salvador) J Guardado	5	10

Second round
3	(Denmark) A Antonsen	21	21
(England) D King	12	18
(Hong Kong) Chan Y C	21	21
(Italy) F Caponio	12	15
9	(Thailand) K Wangcharoen	21	21
(Malaysia) Lee Z J	17	14
(India) S Verma	21	21
(France) T Baures	5	13

Third round
3	(Denmark) A Antonsen	21	21
(Hong Kong) Chan Y C	10	10
9	(Thailand) K Wangcharoen	13	13
(India) S Verma	21	21

Fourth round
3	(Denmark) A Antonsen	12	21	15
(India) S Verma	21	18	21

==== Section 4 ====
First round
(Cuba) A Herrera	17	16
(Canada) J Lai	21	21
(Jamaica) S Wilson	10	13
(South Korea) Kim M-j	21	21
(Japan) K Mitsuhashi	21	21
(Mexico) A J Correa	17	7
10	(Malaysia) S Ramachandran	21	21
(Costa Rica) Z A Zheng	8	7
(New Zealand) O Guo	21	20	21
(Suriname) S Opti	15	22	18
(Macau) Wan W C	21	21
(United States) A La	15	11
(Venezuela) Q Willfer	8	13
(Peru) D Mini	21	21

Second round
7	(France) T J Popov	21	21
(Canada) J Lai	10	18
(South Korea) Kim M-j	16	21	18
(Japan) K Mitsuhashi	21	10	21
10	(Malaysia) S Ramachandran	21	22
(New Zealand) O Guo	16	20
(Macau) Wan W C	11	21	17
(Peru) D Mini	21	19	21

Third round
7	(France) T J Popov	21	20
(Japan) K Mitsuhashi	23	22
10	(Malaysia) S Ramachandran	21	21
(Peru) D Mini	5	11

Fourth round
(Japan) K Mitsuhashi	7	14
10	(Malaysia) S Ramachandran	21	21

=== Bottom half ===
==== Section 5 ====
First round
(South Africa) M Jennings	16	16
(Hong Kong) Lam W L	21	21
(Brazil) D Da Silva	8	11
(Spain) A Vazquez	21	21
(Croatia) F Galjer	18	21	21
(Peru) J Guevara	21	17	6
(Denmark) J Toft	18	15
11	(France) V Medina	21	21
(Australia) Tang HD	21	21
(New Zealand) B Hillier	12	17
(Venezuela) I Elyouri	17	21	21
(Dominican Republic) A A Marinez	21	11	19
(Germany) S Wang	21	21
(Australia) J Lee	8	9

Second round
(Hong Kong) Lam W L	13	8
(Spain) A Vazquez	21	21
(Croatia) F Galjer	7	9
11	(France) V Medina	21	21
(Australia) Tang HD	21	19	21
(Venezuela) I Elyouri	9	21	10
(Germany) S Wang	6	9
6	(Chinese Taipei) Lu C-h	21	21

Third round
(Spain) A Vazquez	9	11
11	(France) V Medina	21	21
(Australia) Tang HD	8	10
6	(Chinese Taipei) Lu C-h	21	21

Fourth round
11	(France) V Medina	13	11
6	(Chinese Taipei) Lu C-h	21	21

==== Section 6 ====
First round
(Sweden) M Lidman	20	13
(Japan) Y Ogura	22	21
(Portugal) R Silva
(Colombia) J Noguera	w	/	o
(Chile) A Medel	4	5
(China) Sun FX	21	21
(Venezuela) J Calanche	8	10
12	(Slovenia) M Ivanic	21	21
(Iceland) K D Finnsson	14	17
(Mexico) F R Trevino	21	21
(Guatemala) R Castellanos	19	21	21
(South Korea) Kang M-h	21	14	16
(Guatemala) M Umana	21	21
(Guyana) N Ramdhani	12	9

Second round
(Japan) Y Ogura	21	21
(Colombia) J Noguera	3	2
(China) Sun FX	21	21
12	(Slovenia) M Ivanic	11	7
(Mexico) F R Trevino	15	15
(Guatemala) R Castellanos	21	21
(Guatemala) M Umana	15	20
4	(China) Lin GP	21	21

Third round
(Japan) Y Ogura	15	21	21
(China) Sun FX	21	19	16
(Guatemala) R Castellanos	8	7
4	(China) Lin GP	21	21

Fourth round
(Japan) Y Ogura	12	17
4	(China) Lin GP	21	21

==== Section 7 ====
First round
(Singapore) Chuang J L	11	8
(Chinese Taipei) Lee C-h	21	21
(Suriname) M A N Chung Tong	21	21
(Argentina) M Delmastro	13	7
(Hungary) B Pytel	21	21
(Germany) F Hammes	17	19
(India) A Yadav	17	11
13	(Singapore) Loh K Y	21	21
(England) L Pearce	13	21	12
(China) Chen JL	21	19	21
(El Salvador) U F Canjura	13	12
(Indonesia) P A Maulana	21	21
(Japan) Y Watanabe	21	21
(Chile) M Gompertz	10	7

Second round
(Chinese Taipei) Lee C-h	21	21
(Suriname) M A N Chung Tong	5	9
(Hungary) B Pytel	16	10
13	(Singapore) Loh K Y	21	21
(China) Chen JL	21	16	22
(Indonesia) P A Maulana	18	21	20
(Japan) Y Watanabe	17	12
5	(Thailand) K Leelavechabutr	21	21

Third round
(Chinese Taipei) Lee C-H	14	21	14
13	(Singapore) Loh K Y	21	13	21
(China) Chen JL	12	13
5	(Thailand) K Leelavechabutr	21	21

Fourth round
13	(Singapore) Loh K Y	22	21	21
5	(Thailand) K Leelavechabutr	24	10	17

==== Section 8 ====
First round
(Barbados) S M Martin	12	9
(Cuba) B Veliz	21	21
(Denmark) M Enghøj	20	21	21
(New Zealand) N Tagle	22	16	8
(Spain) A Nogueira	21	17	17
(Turkey) F Degirmenci	18	21	21
(Canada) J A Ho-Shue	21	21
(Netherlands) S Li	13	14
(Japan) K Watanabe	21	21
(Mexico) A R Correa	14	6
(Macau) Iek U I	18	21	21
(Italy) K Strobl	21	17	16

Second round
(Cuba) B Veliz	12	11
(Denmark) M Enghøj	21	21
(Turkey) F Degirmenci	13	10
15	(India) C Sen	21	21
(Canada) J A Ho-Shue
(Japan) K Watanabe	w	/	o
(Macau) Iek U I	10	11
2	(Malaysia) Cheam J W	21	21

Third round
(Denmark) M Enghøj	16	19
15	(India) C Sen	21	21
(Japan) K Watanabe	21	17	21
2	(Malaysia) Cheam J W	15	21	12

Fourth round
15	(India) C Sen	18	9
(Japan) K Watanabe	21	21
