= Panji Ahmad Maulana =

Indonesian badminton player (born 1997)

Personal information
- Born: 21 July 1997 (age 29) Tasikmalaya, West Java, Indonesia

Sport
- Country: Indonesia
- Sport: Badminton

Men's singles
- Highest ranking: 63 (16 March 2017)
- BWF profile
Medal record
Men's badminton
Representing Indonesia
SEA Games
Gold medal – first place	2017 Kuala Lumpur	Men's team
World Junior Championships
Silver medal – second place	2015 Lima	Mixed team

Panji Ahmad Maulana (born 21 July 1997) is an Indonesian badminton player. He is affiliated with Candra Wijaya club. Maulana was part of Indonesia team that won a silver medal at the 2015 World Junior Championships and a gold medal at the 2017 SEA Games.

== Career ==
Maulana started his career in badminton in a club Garuda Mas in Tasikmalaya. He has also been listed as a member of the Mutiara Cardinal Bandung club. In 2015, he competed at the World Junior Championships in Lima, Peru, and won a silver medal together with Indonesia National junior team. He won his first international title in the 2016 Malaysia International Challenge.

In 2017, he was selected to participate at the Kuala Lumpur SEA Games.

In 2018, he managed to bring Mutiara Cardinal Bandung club to the final of the National Championship held in Britama Arena, Jakarta. In 2019, he started to playing for Candra Wijaya badminton club. Maulana then won the men's singles title at the 2021 Austrian Open.

== Achievements ==
=== BWF International Challenge/Series (3 titles, 1 runner-up) ===
Men's singles
Year	Tournament	Opponent	Score	Result
2016	Malaysia International	(Malaysia) Satheishtharan Ramachandran	21–9, 16–21, 21–12	(gold) Winner
2017	Iran Fajr International	(Indonesia) Vega Vio Nirwanda	11–4, 6–11, 11–6, 11–8	(gold) Winner
2021	Slovenian International	(France) Arnaud Merklé	8–21, 10–21	(silver) Runner-up
2021	Austrian Open	(France) Arnaud Merklé	11–21, 21–8, 21–15	(gold) Winner

BWF International Challenge tournament
BWF Future Series tournament

=== BWF Junior International (1 title, 1 runner-up) ===
Boys' singles
Year	Tournament	Opponent	Score	Result
2014	Indonesia Junior International	(Indonesia) Firman Abdul Kholik	15–21, 13–21	(silver) Runner-up
2015	Indonesia Junior International	(Thailand) Kantawat Leelavechabutr	21–17, 23–21	(gold) Winner

BWF Junior International Grand Prix tournament
BWF Junior International Challenge tournament
BWF Junior International Series tournament
BWF Junior Future Series tournament

== Performance timeline ==
Key

W	Won	F	Finalist	SF	Semi-finalist
QF	Quarter-finalist	#R	Rounds 4, 3, 2, 1	RR	Round-robin stage
Q#	Qualification round	A	Absent	w/d	Withdrew
G	Gold	S	Silver	B	Bronze
NH	Not held	N/A	Not applicable	DNQ	Did not qualify

=== Indonesian team ===
- Junior level

Team events	2015
World Junior Championships	S

- Senior level

Team events	2017
SEA Games	G

=== Individual competitions ===
- Junior level

Event	2015
World Junior Championships	2R

- Senior level

Tournament	BWF Superseries / Grand Prix			BWF World Tour					Best
Tournament	2015	2016	2017	2018	2019	2020	2021	2022	Best
Syed Modi International	A			1R	A	NH		A	1R ('18)
Korea Masters	A		QF	1R	A	NH		A	QF ('17)
Thailand Open	A	3R	2R	A			NH	A	3R ('16)
Indonesia Masters	1R	A	NH	A		NH		Q1	1R ('15)
Akita Masters	NH			3R	A	NH			3R ('18)
Vietnam Open	A	2R	3R	A		NH		A	3R ('17)
Indonesia Masters Super 100	NH			QF	3R	NH		2R	QF ('18)
Macau Open	A		2R	1R	A	NH			2R ('17)
Australian Open	A			2R	A	NH		A	2R ('18)
New Zealand Open	A			2R	A	NH			2R ('18)
China Masters	A		1R	A		NH			1R ('17)
Hyderabad Open	NH			2R	A	NH			2R ('18)
Lingshui China Masters	N/A			QF	A	NH			QF ('18)
Thailand Masters	NH	A		2R	A		NH		2R ('18)
Year-end ranking	433	91	73	72	244	237	167	223	63
Tournament	2015	2016	2017	2018	2019	2020	2021	2022	Best
