= Adulrach Namkul =

Thai badminton player (born 1997)

Personal information
- Born: 2 November 1997 (age 29) Ayutthaya, Thailand
- Height: 1.79 m (5 ft 10 in)

Sport
- Country: Thailand
- Sport: Badminton
- Handedness: Right

Men's singles
- Highest ranking: 95 (8 February 2018)
- BWF profile
Medal record
Men's badminton
Representing Thailand
Sudirman Cup
Bronze medal – third place	2017 Gold Coast	Mixed team
Asia Mixed Team Championships
Bronze medal – third place	2017 Ho Chi Minh	Mixed team
SEA Games
Bronze medal – third place	2017 Kuala Lumpur	Men's team
World Junior Championships
Bronze medal – third place	2014 Alor Setar	Mixed team
Bronze medal – third place	2015 Lima	Boys' singles

Adulrach Namkul (Thai: อดุลรัชต์ นามกูล; born 2 November 1997) is a Thai badminton player. He won the bronze medal at the 2015 World Junior Championships in the boys' singles event. He was also part of the Thailand national team that won the bronze medal at the 2017 Sudirman Cup.

== Achievements ==
=== BWF World Junior Championships ===
Boys' singles
Year	Venue	Opponent	Score	Result
2015	Centro de Alto Rendimiento de La Viden; Lima, Peru	(India) Siril Verma	15–21, 14–21	Bronze

=== BWF International Challenge/Series (1 runner-up) ===
Men's singles
Year	Tournament	Opponent	Score	Result
2019	Nepal International	(Vietnam) Phạm Cao Cường	22–24, 21–9, 19–21	(silver) Runner-up

BWF International Challenge tournament
BWF International Series tournament
BWF Future Series tournament
