= Goh Giap Chin =

Malaysian badminton player (born 1995)

Goh Giap Chin 吴业振
Personal information
- Born: 20 May 1993 (age 33) Penang, Malaysia
- Years active: 2009–2020

Sport
- Country: Malaysia
- Sport: Badminton
- Handedness: Right

Men's singles
- Career record: 136 wins, 76 losses
- Highest ranking: 66 (14 September 2017)
- Current ranking: 724 (27 September 2022)
- BWF profile
Medal record
Men's badminton
Representing Malaysia
Islamic Solidarity Games
Gold medal – first place	2013 Palembang	Men's team
Silver medal – second place	2013 Palembang	Men's singles
World Junior Championships
Gold medal – first place	2011 Taipei	Mixed team
Asian Junior Championships
Silver medal – second place	2011 Lucknow	Mixed team

Goh Giap Chin

Chinese name
- Traditional Chinese: 吳業振
- Simplified Chinese: 吴业振
- Hanyu Pinyin: Wú Yè Zhèn
- Jyutping: Ng4 Jip6 Zan3
- Hokkien POJ: Gô͘ Gia̍p-chín
- Tâi-lô: Gôo Gia̍p-tsín

Goh Giap Chin (simplified Chinese: 吴业振; traditional Chinese: 吳業振; pinyin: Wú Yè Zhèn; Jyutping: Ng4 Jip6 Zan3; Pe̍h-ōe-jī: Gô͘ Gia̍p-chín; born 19 May 1995) is a former Malaysian badminton player. He was part of the Malaysian team that won gold in the 2011 BWF World Junior Championships mixed team event and silver at the 2011 Asian Junior Badminton Championships.

In 2013, Goh won a silver medal in men's singles at the 2013 Islamic Solidarity Games in Palembang. He also won the Indonesia International in 2016 and finished as runner-up at the Vietnam International in 2018 after losing to Kento Momota in the final. He is a three time men's singles champion at the Mauritius International. He was a semifinalist at the 2017 Vietnam Open Grand Prix.

Goh announced his retirement from international badminton in 2020.

== Early life ==
Goh was born in Butterworth in Penang. He was later drafted to the Bukit Jalil Sports School and joined the Badminton Association of Malaysia where he was coached by Hendrawan.

== Achievements ==
=== Islamic Solidarity Games ===
Men's singles

Year	Venue	Opponent	Score	Result
2013	Dempo Sports Hall, Palembang, Indonesia	(Malaysia) Nur Mohd Azriyn Ayub	12–21, 21–15, 12–21	Silver

=== BWF International Challenge/Series (4 titles, 1 runner-up) ===
Men's singles

Year	Tournament	Opponent	Score	Result
2016	Indonesia International	(Indonesia) Krishna Adi Nugraha	24–22, 21–19	(gold) Winner
2017	Mauritius International	(Israel) Misha Zilberman	21–19, 21–14	(gold) Winner
2018	Vietnam International	(Japan) Kento Momota	9–21, 15–21	(silver) Runner-up
2018	Mauritius International	(Myanmar) Aung Myo Htoo	21–15, 21–12	(gold) Winner
2019	Mauritius International	(Switzerland) Christian Kirchmayr	21–17, 21–17	(gold) Winner

BWF International Challenge tournament
BWF International Series tournament
BWF Future Series tournament
