= Yeoh Seng Zoe =

Malaysian badminton player (born 1997)

Yeoh Seng Zoe 楊升宙
Personal information
- Born: 28 September 1997 (age 29) Penang, Malaysia

Sport
- Country: Malaysia
- Sport: Badminton
- Handedness: Right

Men's singles
- Highest ranking: 85 (23 May 2023)
- BWF profile

Yeoh Seng Zoe (Chinese: 楊升宙; born 28 September 1997) is a Malaysian badminton player. He won the first international title at 2019 Nepal International.

== Career ==
He started off his junior career by winning the Uganda International title with partner Chong Chun Quan. He then competed in the 2015 BWF World Junior Championships where he lost to Firman Abdul Kholik in the fourth round. He was part of the squad that participated in the 2015 BWF World Junior Championships team events.

In 2017, he left the Badminton Association of Malaysia to play as an independent player. In 2019, he won the Nepal International by defeating Swarnaraj Bora with a score of 21–19, 21–8. In 2021, he won his first International title at the Irish Open which is considered his biggest career win to date.

In 2022, he got into the finals of the Swedish Open but had to concede a walkover after sustaining an injury. He then won the 2022 Austrian Open.

== Achievements ==
=== BWF International Challenge/Series (4 titles, 2 runner-up) ===
Men singles
Year	Tournament	Opponent	Score	Result
2019	Nepal International	(India) Swarnaraj Bora	21–19, 21–8	(gold) Winner
2019	Welsh International	(Denmark) Ditlev Jaeger Holm	13–21, 12–21	(silver) Runner-up
2021	Irish Open	(Denmark) Mads Christophersen	21–18, 21–14	(gold) Winner
2022	Swedish Open	(Malaysia) Kok Jing Hong	Walkover	(silver) Runner-up
2022	Austrian Open	(Denmark) Magnus Johannesen	21–14, 21–15	(gold) Winner

Men's doubles
Year	Tournament	Partner	Opponent	Score	Result
2014	Uganda International	(Malaysia) Chong Chun Quan	(South Africa) Andries Malan (South Africa) Willem Viljoen	21–14, 11–21, 21–14	(gold) Winner

BWF International Challenge tournament
BWF International Series tournament
