= Chayanit Chaladchalam =

Thai badminton player (born 1991)

Personal information
- Born: 8 March 1991 (age 35) Nakhon Si Thammarat, Thailand
- Height: 1.63 m (5 ft 4 in)
- Weight: 62 kg (137 lb)

Sport
- Country: Thailand
- Sport: Badminton
- Handedness: Left

Women's doubles
- Highest ranking: 14 (with Phataimas Muenwong 15 March 2018)
- BWF profile
Medal record
Women's badminton
Representing Thailand
Uber Cup
Silver medal – second place	2018 Bangkok	Women's team
Asian Games
Bronze medal – third place	2018 Jakarta-Palembang	Women's team
Asia Team Championships
Bronze medal – third place	2016 Hyderabad	Women's team
Bronze medal – third place	2020 Manila	Women's team
SEA Games
Gold medal – first place	2019 Philippines	Women's team
Silver medal – second place	2019 Philippines	Women's doubles
Summer Universiade
Silver medal – second place	2017 Taipei	Women's doubles
Bronze medal – third place	2015 Gwangju	Mixed team
Bronze medal – third place	2017 Taipei	Mixed team
World Junior Championships
Bronze medal – third place	2009 Alor Setar	Mixed team
Asian Junior Championships
Bronze medal – third place	2009 Kuala Lumpur	Mixed team

Chayanit Chaladchalam (Thai: ชญานิษฐ์ ฉลาดแฉลม; born 8 March 1991) is a Thai badminton player. She was part of Thai squad that won gold medal at the 2019 Philippines SEA Games.

== Career ==
She plays in the women's doubles with her partner Phataimas Muenwong. Together they participated in the 2015 Vietnam Open Grand Prix, in the 2016 Chinese Taipei Masters and in the 2015 Chinese Taipei Open Grand Prix Gold.

== Achievements ==
=== SEA Games ===
Women's doubles
Year	Venue	Partner	Opponent	Score	Result
2019	Muntinlupa Sports Complex; Metro Manila, Philippines	(Thailand) Phataimas Muenwong	(Indonesia) Greysia Polii (Indonesia) Apriyani Rahayu	3–21, 18–21	Silver

=== Summer Universiade ===
Women's doubles
Year	Venue	Partner	Opponent	Score	Result
2017	Taipei Gymnasium; Taipei, Taiwan	(Thailand) Phataimas Muenwong	(Chinese Taipei) Hsu Ya-ching (Chinese Taipei) Wu Ti-jung	17–21, 20–22	Silver

=== BWF Grand Prix (1 title, 1 runner-up) ===
The BWF Grand Prix had two levels, the Grand Prix and Grand Prix Gold. It was a series of badminton tournaments sanctioned by the Badminton World Federation (BWF) and played between 2007 and 2017.

Women's doubles
Year	Tournament	Partner	Opponent	Score	Result
2017	Vietnam Open	(Thailand) Phataimas Muenwong	(Indonesia) Della Destiara Haris (Indonesia) Rizki Amelia Pradipta	21–16, 21–19	(gold) Winner
2017	Thailand Open	(Thailand) Phataimas Muenwong	(Indonesia) Greysia Polii (Indonesia) Apriyani Rahayu	12–21, 12–21	(silver) Runner-up

BWF Grand Prix Gold tournament
BWF Grand Prix tournament

=== BWF International Challenge/Series (5 titles, 3 runners-up) ===
Women's doubles
Year	Tournament	Partner	Opponent	Score	Result
2011	Smiling Fish International	(Thailand) Pattharaporn Jindapol	(Thailand) Narissapat Lam (Thailand) Maetenee Phattanaphitoon	21–16, 21–18	(gold) Winner
2015	Vietnam International	(Thailand) Phataimas Muenwong	(Indonesia) Anggia Shitta Awanda (Indonesia) Ni Ketut Mahadewi Istarani	10–21, 18–21	(silver) Runner-up
2015	Sri Lanka International	(Thailand) Phataimas Muenwong	(India) Pradnya Gadre (India) N. Sikki Reddy	21–17, 14–21, 21–14	(gold) Winner
2015	Bahrain International Challenge	(Thailand) Phataimas Muenwong	(Thailand) Savitree Amitrapai (Thailand) Pacharapun Chochuwong	6–21, 21–15, 16–21	(silver) Runner-up
2015	Malaysia International	(Thailand) Phataimas Muenwong	(Indonesia) Della Destiara Haris (Indonesia) Rosyita Eka Putri Sari	18–21, 12–21	(silver) Runner-up
2015	Bangladesh International	(Thailand) Phataimas Muenwong	(Malaysia) Lee Meng Yean (Malaysia) Lim Yin Loo	21–15, 21–19	(gold) Winner
2015	India International	(Thailand) Phataimas Muenwong	(India) K. Maneesha (India) N. Sikki Reddy	21–11, 15–21, 21–13	(gold) Winner

Mixed doubles
Year	Tournament	Partner	Opponent	Score	Result
2013	Singapore International	(Thailand) Vasin Nilyoke	(Chinese Taipei) Wang Chi-lin (Chinese Taipei) Chen Szu-yu	21–14, 21–13	(gold) Winner

BWF International Challenge tournament
BWF International Series tournament
BWF Future Series tournament
