= 2015 BWF World Junior Championships =

Tournament details
- Dates: 4–15 November 2015
- Edition: 17th
- Level: International
- Venue: Centro de Alto Rendimiento de La Videna
- Location: Lima, Peru

The 2015 BWF World Junior Championships is the seventeenth tournament of the BWF World Junior Championships. It is held in Lima, Peru at the Centro de Alto Rendimiento de La Videna between 4–15 November 2015.

== Medalists ==
Event	Gold	Silver	Bronze
Teams	China; Chen Jinlin; Han Chengkai; He Jiting; Lin Guipu; Ren Xiangyu; Sun Feixiang; Tan Qiang; Ye Binghong; Zheng Siwei; Zhou Haodong; Chen Lu; Chen Qingchen; Chen Yufei; Du Yue; Gao Fangjie; He Bingjiao; Jia Yifan; Li Yinhui; Li Yun; Zhou Chaomin	Indonesia; Firman Abdul Kholik; Yahya Adi Kumara; Panji Ahmad Maulana; Andika Ramadiansyah; Rinov Rivaldy; Yantoni Edy Saputra; Mychelle Crhystine Bandaso; Devi Yunita Indah Sari; Marsheilla Gischa Islami; Serena Kani; Rahmadhani Hastiyanti Putri; Gregoria Mariska Tunjung	Chinese Taipei; Chen Chun-wei; Chien Hung-ju; Hsu Chen-yang; Lee Chia-hao; Lu Chia-hung; Po Li-wei; Yang Ming-tse; Chen Wan-ting; Hsu Wen-chi; Lai I-ting; Lee Chia-hsin; Sung Shuo-yun
Boys' singles	(Chinese Taipei) Lu Chia-hung	(India) Siril Verma	(Japan) Koki Watanabe
Boys' singles	(Chinese Taipei) Lu Chia-hung	(India) Siril Verma	(Thailand) Adulrach Namkul
Girls' singles	(Malaysia) Goh Jin Wei	(Malaysia) Lee Ying Ying	(Japan) Natsuki Nidaira
Girls' singles	(Malaysia) Goh Jin Wei	(Malaysia) Lee Ying Ying	(Japan) Moe Araki
Boys' doubles	(China) He Jiting (China) Zheng Siwei	(Denmark) Joel Eipe (Denmark) Federik Sogaard Mortensen	(China) Han Chengkai (China) Zhou Haodong
Boys' doubles	(China) He Jiting (China) Zheng Siwei	(Denmark) Joel Eipe (Denmark) Federik Sogaard Mortensen	(Japan) Kenya Mitsuhashi (Japan) Yuta Watanabe
Girls' doubles	(China) Chen Qingchen (China) Jia Yifan	(China) Du Yue (China) Li Yinhui	(Japan) Nami Matsuyama (Japan) Chiharu Shida
Girls' doubles	(China) Chen Qingchen (China) Jia Yifan	(China) Du Yue (China) Li Yinhui	(Chinese Taipei) Chen Wan-ting (Chinese Taipei) Lee Chia-hsin
Mixed doubles	(China) Zheng Siwei (China) Chen Qingchen	(China) He Jiting (China) Du Yue	(Indonesia) Fachriza Abimanyu (Indonesia) Apriani Rahayu
Mixed doubles	(China) Zheng Siwei (China) Chen Qingchen	(China) He Jiting (China) Du Yue	(Japan) Shuto Morioka (Japan) Chiharu Shida

== Medal table ==
Rank	Nation	Gold	Silver	Bronze	Total
1	China (CHN)	4	2	1	7
2	Malaysia (MAS)	1	1	0	2
3	Chinese Taipei (TPE)	1	0	2	3
4	Indonesia (INA)	0	1	1	2
5	Denmark (DEN)	0	1	0	1
5	India (IND)	0	1	0	1
7	Japan (JPN)	0	0	6	6
8	Thailand (THA)	0	0	1	1
Totals (8 entries)		6	6	11	23
