= Wen Hao-yun =

Taiwanese badminton player (born 1995)

Wen Hao-yun 温晧昀
Personal information
- Born: 4 November 1995 (age 30)

Sport
- Country: Taiwan
- Sport: Badminton

Women's & Mixed Doubles
- Highest ranking: 229 (WD) 16 Jan 2014; 460 (XD) 17 Jul 2014
- BWF profile
Medal record
Badminton
Representing Chinese Taipei
Summer Universiade
Gold medal – first place	2017 Taipei	Mixed team

Wen Hao-yun (born 4 November 1995) is a Taiwanese female badminton player.

== Achievements ==
=== BWF International Challenge/Series ===
Mixed Doubles

Year	Tournament	Partner	Opponent	Score	Result
2016	Malaysia International	(Chinese Taipei) Yang Po-hsuan	(Malaysia) Goh Soon Huat (Malaysia) Shevon Jemie Lai	13-21, 17-21	(silver) Runner-up

BWF International Challenge tournament
BWF International Series tournament
BWF Future Series tournament
