= Phataimas Muenwong =

Thai badminton player (born 1995)

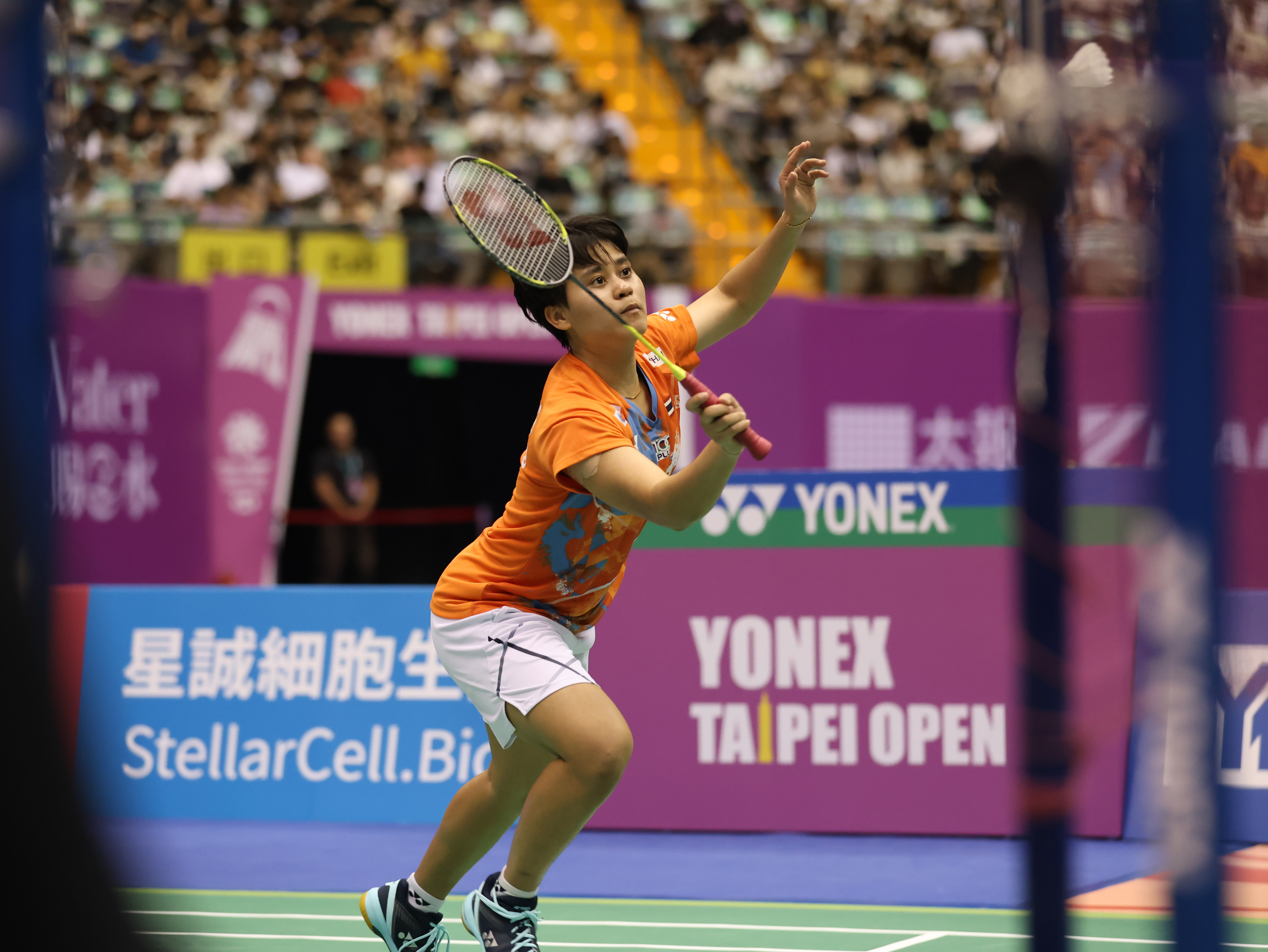
- Muenwong at the 2024 Taipei Open

Personal information
- Born: 5 July 1995 (age 31) Surat Thani, Thailand
- Height: 1.56 m (5 ft 1 in)
- Weight: 52 kg (115 lb)

Sport
- Country: Thailand
- Sport: Badminton
- Handedness: Right

Women's & mixed doubles
- Highest ranking: 12 (WD with Laksika Kanlaha, 4 February 2025); 14 (WD with Chayanit Chaladchalam, 15 March 2018); 19 (XD with Pakkapon Teeraratsakul, 11 March 2025)
- BWF profile
Medal record
Women's badminton
Representing Thailand
Uber Cup
Silver medal – second place	2018 Bangkok	Women's team
Bronze medal – third place	2022 Bangkok	Women's team
Asian Games
Bronze medal – third place	2018 Jakarta-Palembang	Women's team
Asia Mixed Team Championships
Bronze medal – third place	2023 Dubai	Mixed team
Bronze medal – third place	2025 Qingdao	Mixed team
Asia Team Championships
Silver medal – second place	2024 Selangor	Women's team
Bronze medal – third place	2016 Hyderabad	Women's team
Bronze medal – third place	2020 Manila	Women's team
SEA Games
Gold medal – first place	2019 Philippines	Women's team
Gold medal – first place	2021 Hanoi	Women's team
Gold medal – first place	2023 Cambodia	Women's team
Silver medal – second place	2019 Philippines	Women's doubles
Bronze medal – third place	2023 Cambodia	Mixed doubles
Summer Universiade
Silver medal – second place	2017 Taipei	Women's doubles
Bronze medal – third place	2015 Gwangju	Mixed team
Bronze medal – third place	2017 Taipei	Mixed team

Phataimas Muenwong (Thai: ผไทมาส เหมือนวงษ์; born 5 July 1995) is a Thai badminton player.

== Career ==
Muenwong studied at the Rattana Bundit University, and competed at the 2015 and 2017 Summer Universiade. She plays in the women's doubles with her partner Chayanit Chaladchalam. Together they participated in the 2015 Vietnam Open Grand Prix, in the 2016 Chinese Taipei Masters and in the 2015 Chinese Taipei Open Grand Prix Gold.

== Achievements ==
=== SEA Games ===
Women's doubles
Year	Venue	Partner	Opponent	Score	Result
2019	Muntinlupa Sports Complex; Metro Manila, Philippines	(Thailand) Chayanit Chaladchalam	(Indonesia) Greysia Polii (Indonesia) Apriyani Rahayu	3–21, 18–21	Silver

Mixed doubles
Year	Venue	Partner	Opponent	Score	Result
2023	Morodok Techo Badminton Hall; Phnom Penh, Cambodia	(Thailand) Pakkapon Teeraratsakul	(Malaysia) Yap Roy King (Malaysia) Cheng Su Yin	22–24, 27–25, 19–21	Bronze

=== Summer Universiade ===
Women's doubles
Year	Venue	Partner	Opponent	Score	Result
2017	Taipei Gymnasium; Taipei, Taiwan	(Thailand) Chayanit Chaladchalam	(Chinese Taipei) Hsu Ya-ching (Chinese Taipei) Wu Ti-jung	17–21, 20–22	Silver

=== BWF World Tour (4 titles, 3 runners-up) ===
The BWF World Tour, which was announced on 19 March 2017 and implemented in 2018, is a series of elite badminton tournaments sanctioned by the Badminton World Federation (BWF). The BWF World Tours are divided into levels of World Tour Finals, Super 1000, Super 750, Super 500, Super 300, and the BWF Tour Super 100.

Women's doubles
Year	Tournament	Level	Partner	Opponent	Score	Result
2023	Malaysia Super 100	Super 100	(Thailand) Laksika Kanlaha	(Hong Kong) Lui Lok Lok (Hong Kong) Ng Wing Yung	16–21, 21–16, 21–16	(gold) Winner
2024	Ruichang China Masters	Super 100	(Thailand) Laksika Kanlaha	(China) Chen Xiaofei (China) Feng Xueying	17–21, 21–15, 21–16	(gold) Winner
2024	U.S. Open	Super 300	(Thailand) Laksika Kanlaha	(Japan) Rin Iwanaga (Japan) Kie Nakanishi	19–21, 15–21	(silver) Runner-up
2025	Thailand Masters	Super 300	(Thailand) Laksika Kanlaha	(Indonesia) Lanny Tria Mayasari (Indonesia) Siti Fadia Silva Ramadhanti	21–15, 13–21, 8–21	(silver) Runner-up

Mixed doubles
Year	Tournament	Level	Partner	Opponent	Score	Result
2023	Malaysia Super 100	Super 100	(Thailand) Pakkapon Teeraratsakul	(Malaysia) Chan Peng Soon (Malaysia) Cheah Yee See	9–21, 21–17, 10–21	(silver) Runner-up
2024	U.S. Open	Super 300	(Thailand) Pakkapon Teeraratsakul	(Denmark) Jesper Toft (Denmark) Amalie Magelund	15–21, 21–19, 21–13	(gold) Winner
2024	Taipei Open	Super 300	(Thailand) Pakkapon Teeraratsakul	(Chinese Taipei) Yang Po-hsuan (Chinese Taipei) Hu Ling-fang	21–17, 21–19	(gold) Winner

=== BWF Grand Prix (1 title, 1 runner-up) ===
The BWF Grand Prix had two levels, the Grand Prix and Grand Prix Gold. It was a series of badminton tournaments sanctioned by the Badminton World Federation (BWF) and played between 2007 and 2017.

Women's doubles
Year	Tournament	Partner	Opponent	Score	Result
2017	Vietnam Open	(Thailand) Chayanit Chaladchalam	(Indonesia) Della Destiara Haris (Indonesia) Rizki Amelia Pradipta	21–16, 21–19	(gold) Winner
2017	Thailand Open	(Thailand) Chayanit Chaladchalam	(Indonesia) Greysia Polii (Indonesia) Apriyani Rahayu	12–21, 12–21	(silver) Runner-up

BWF Grand Prix Gold tournament
BWF Grand Prix tournament

=== BWF International Challenge/Series (15 titles, 3 runners-up) ===
Women's doubles
Year	Tournament	Partner	Opponent	Score	Result
2014	Sri Lanka International	(Thailand) Kilasu Ostermeyer	(India) Pradnya Gadre (India) N. Sikki Reddy	21–14, 21–17	(gold) Winner
2015	Vietnam International	(Thailand) Chayanit Chaladchalam	(Indonesia) Anggia Shitta Awanda (Indonesia) Ni Ketut Mahadewi Istarani	10–21, 18–21	(silver) Runner-up
2015	Sri Lanka International	(Thailand) Chayanit Chaladchalam	(India) Pradnya Gadre (India) N. Sikki Reddy	21–17, 14–21, 21–14	(gold) Winner
2015	Bahrain International Challenge	(Thailand) Chayanit Chaladchalam	(Thailand) Savitree Amitrapai (Thailand) Pacharapun Chochuwong	6–21, 21–15, 16–21	(silver) Runner-up
2015	Malaysia International	(Thailand) Chayanit Chaladchalam	(Indonesia) Della Destiara Haris (Indonesia) Rosyita Eka Putri Sari	18–21, 12–21	(silver) Runner-up
2015	Bangladesh International	(Thailand) Chayanit Chaladchalam	(Malaysia) Lee Meng Yean (Malaysia) Lim Yin Loo	21–15, 21–19	(gold) Winner
2015	India International	(Thailand) Chayanit Chaladchalam	(India) K. Maneesha (India) N. Sikki Reddy	21–11, 15–21, 21–13	(gold) Winner
2021	Hungarian International	(Thailand) Ornnicha Jongsathapornparn	(Denmark) Amalie Cecilie Kudsk (Denmark) Frederikke Lund	21–10, 21–6	(gold) Winner
2022	Bangladesh International	(Thailand) Laksika Kanlaha	(Thailand) Supamart Mingchua (Thailand) Pattaraporn Rungruengpramong	21–13, 21–16	(gold) Winner
2023	Maldives International	(Thailand) Laksika Kanlaha	(India) K. Ashwini Bhat (India) Shikha Gautam	24–22, 21–15	(gold) Winner
2023 (II)	Indonesia International	(Thailand) Laksika Kanlaha	(Japan) Sayaka Hobara (Japan) Yui Suizu	21–18, 21–18	(gold) Winner
2024	Vietnam International	(Thailand) Laksika Kanlaha	(Japan) Kokona Ishikawa (Japan) Mio Konegawa	21–19, 21–14	(gold) Winner
2024	Thailand International	(Thailand) Laksika Kanlaha	(Chinese Taipei) Lin Xiao-min (Chinese Taipei) Liu Chiao-yun	12–21, 21–12, 21–16	(gold) Winner
2024	Denmark Challenge	(Thailand) Laksika Kanlaha	(Japan) Kokona Ishikawa (Japan) Mio Konegawa	21–16, 21–18	(gold) Winner

Mixed doubles
Year	Tournament	Partner	Opponent	Score	Result
2014	Smiling Fish International	(Thailand) Watchara Buranakruea	(Thailand) Songphon Anugritayawon (Thailand) Natcha Saengchote	21–19, 21–10	(gold) Winner
2015	Smiling Fish International	(Thailand) Parinyawat Thongnuam	(Indonesia) Beno Drajat (Indonesia) Yulfira Barkah	21–16, 21–13	(gold) Winner
2024	Vietnam International	(Thailand) Pakkapon Teeraratsakul	(Indonesia) Amri Syahnawi (Indonesia) Indah Cahya Sari Jamil	21–19, 21–12	(gold) Winner
2024	Thailand International	(Thailand) Pakkapon Teeraratsakul	(Indonesia) Marwan Faza (Indonesia) Felisha Pasaribu	21–13, 21–9	(gold) Winner

BWF International Challenge tournament
BWF International Series tournament
BWF Future Series tournament
