= Hu Ling-fang =

Taiwanese badminton player (born 1998)

Hu Ling-fang 胡綾芳
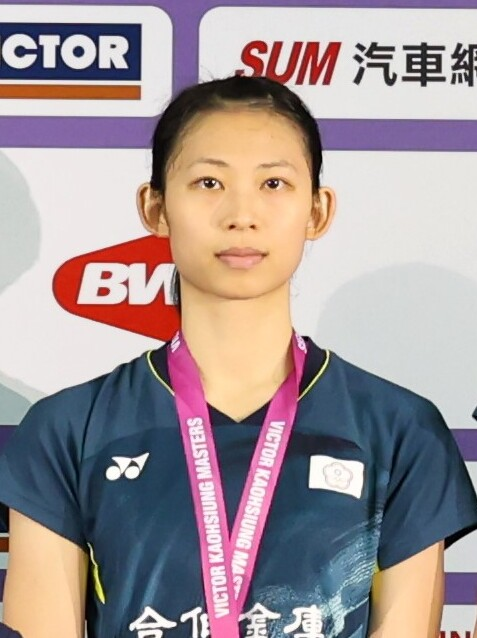
- Hu at the 2024 Kaohsiung Masters

Personal information
- Born: 6 April 1998 (age 28) Kaohsiung, Taiwan
- Height: 1.71 m (5 ft 7 in)
- Weight: 62 kg (137 lb)

Sport
- Country: Taiwan
- Sport: Badminton
- Handedness: Right

Women's & mixed doubles
- Highest ranking: 22 (WD with Hsu Ya-ching, 18 February 2020); 6 (XD with Yang Po-hsuan, 11 March 2025)
- Current ranking: 34 (WD with Jheng Yu-chieh); 11 (XD with Yang Po-hsuan) (17 November 2026)
- BWF profile

Hu Ling-fang (Chinese: 胡綾芳; pinyin: Hú Língfāng; born 6 April 1998) is a Taiwanese badminton player. In 2016, she was selected to compete at the 2016 Thomas & Uber Cup. She played as a third women's singles and finally the Taiwanese team beat the Mauritanian with the score 5-0. She won her first senior international title at the 2017 Finnish Open in the mixed doubles event partnered with Tseng Min-hao. Hu also joined the national team participating at the 2018 Asian Games.

== Achievements ==
=== BWF World Tour (5 runners-up) ===
The BWF World Tour, which was announced on 19 March 2017 and implemented in 2018, is a series of elite badminton tournaments sanctioned by the Badminton World Federation (BWF). The BWF World Tour is divided into levels of World Tour Finals, Super 1000, Super 750, Super 500, Super 300 (part of the HSBC World Tour), and the BWF Tour Super 100.

Women's doubles
Year	Tournament	Level	Partner	Opponent	Score	Result
2019	Orléans Masters	Super 100	(Chinese Taipei) Hsu Ya-ching	(England) Chloe Birch (England) Lauren Smith	18–21, 17–21	(silver) Runner-up

Mixed doubles
Year	Tournament	Level	Partner	Opponent	Score	Result
2024	Singapore Open	Super 750	(Chinese Taipei) Yang Po-hsuan	(China) Zheng Siwei (China) Huang Yaqiong	11–21, 19–21	(silver) Runner-up
2024	Kaohsiung Masters	Super 100	(Chinese Taipei) Yang Po-hsuan	(Thailand) Ruttanapak Oupthong (Thailand) Jhenicha Sudjaipraparat	18–21, 13–21	(silver) Runner-up
2024	Taipei Open	Super 300	(Chinese Taipei) Yang Po-hsuan	(Thailand) Pakkapon Teeraratsakul (Thailand) Phataimas Muenwong	17–21, 19–21	(silver) Runner-up
2026	Taipei Open	Super 300	(Chinese Taipei) Yang Po-hsuan	(Japan) Yuta Watanabe (Japan) Maya Taguchi	19–21, 8–21	(silver) Runner-up

=== BWF International Challenge/Series (1 title, 1 runner-up) ===
Mixed doubles
Year	Tournament	Partner	Opponent	Score	Result
2017	Polish Open	(Chinese Taipei) Tseng Min-hao	(Poland) Robert Mateusiak (Poland) Nadieżda Zięba	22–20, 20–22, 13–21	(silver) Runner-up
2017	Finnish Open	(Chinese Taipei) Tseng Min-hao	(Denmark) Mikkel Mikkelsen (Denmark) Mai Surrow	24–22, 21–16	(gold) Winner

BWF International Challenge tournament
BWF International Series tournament
BWF Future Series tournament
