= Lu Chia-hung =

Taiwanese badminton player (born 1997)

Lu Chia-hung 呂家弘
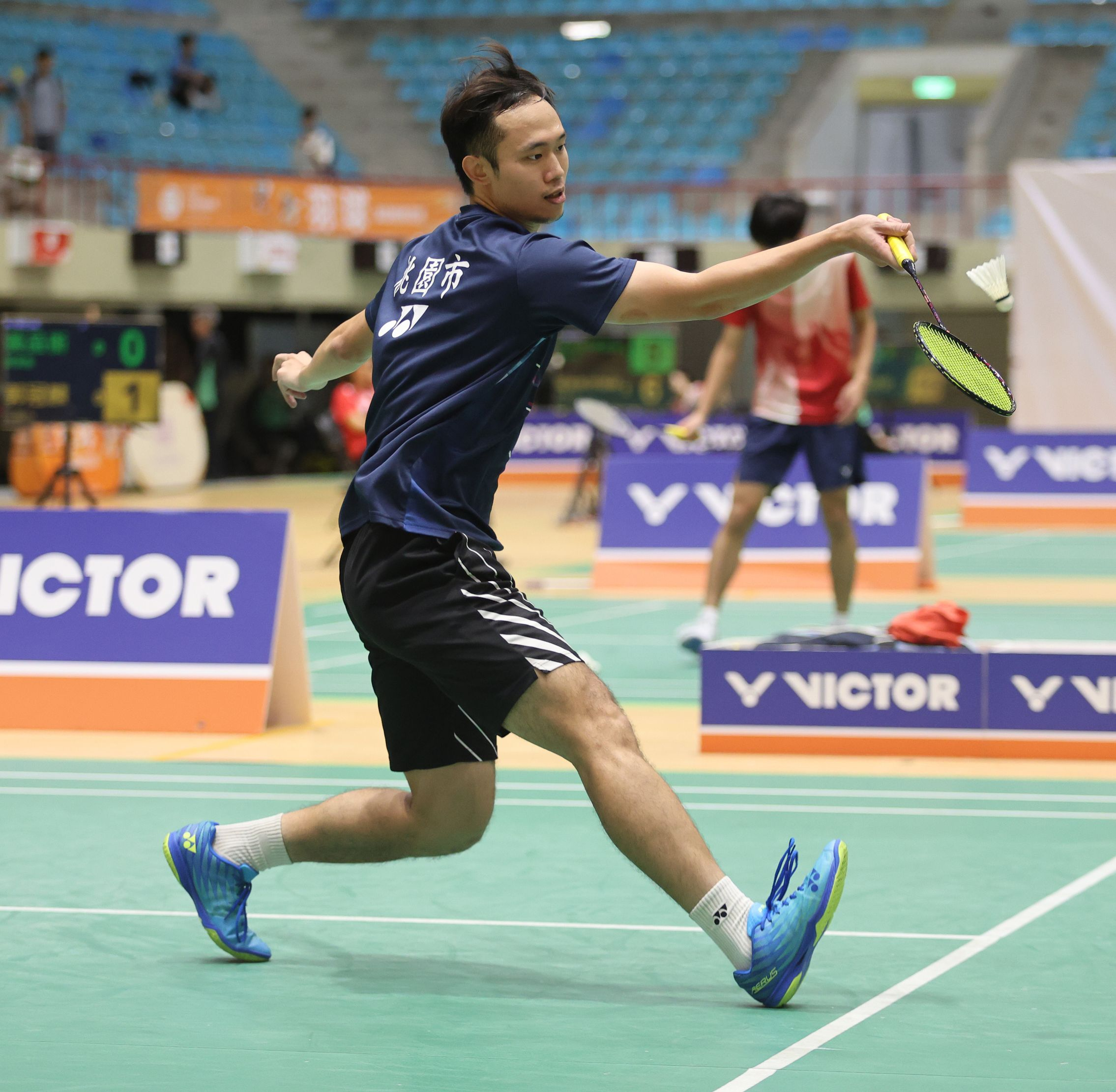

Personal information
- Born: 4 March 1997 (age 29) Kaohsiung, Taiwan
- Height: 1.81 m (5 ft 11 in)
- Weight: 72 kg (159 lb)

Sport
- Country: Taiwan
- Sport: Badminton
- Handedness: Right

Men's singles & doubles
- Highest ranking: 67 (MS 20 December 2018); 158 (MD 30 August 2018); 181 (XD 30 April 2015)
- Current ranking: 74 (MS 31 January 2023)
- BWF profile
Medal record
Men's badminton
Representing Chinese Taipei
World Junior Championships
Gold medal – first place	2015 Lima	Boys' singles
Bronze medal – third place	2015 Lima	Mixed team
Asian Junior Championships
Bronze medal – third place	2014 Taipei	Mixed team
Bronze medal – third place	2015 Bangkok	Boys' singles

Lu Chia-hung (Chinese: 呂家弘; born 4 March 1997) is a Taiwanese badminton player who joined the national team since he was 12 years old. He competed at the 2014 Summer Youth Olympics. In 2015, Lu was crown as the boys' singles champion at the World Junior Championships.

== Personal information ==
His brother Lu Chia-pin and sister Jia Qian are also badminton players.

== Achievements ==
=== BWF World Junior Championships ===
Boys' singles
Year	Venue	Opponent	Score	Result
2015	Centro de Alto Rendimiento de la Videna; Lima, Peru	(India) Siril Verma	17–21, 21–10, 21–7	Gold

=== Asian Junior Championships ===
Boys' singles
Year	Venue	Opponent	Score	Result
2015	CPB Badminton Training Center; Bangkok, Thailand	(South Korea) Seo Seung-jae	14–21, 18–21	Bronze

=== BWF International Challenge/Series (7 titles, 4 runners-up) ===
Men's singles
Year	Tournament	Opponent	Score	Result
2014	Auckland International	(Chinese Taipei) Kuo Po-cheng	11–9, 11–7, 11–4	(gold) Winner
2014	Vietnam International Series	(Malaysia) Lim Chi Wing	19–21, 21–11, 17–21	(silver) Runner-up
2015	Auckland International	(Chinese Taipei) Huang Yu-yu	21–12, 21–14	(gold) Winner
2015	Maribyrnong International	(Spain) Ernesto Velazquez	21–15, 21–18	(gold) Winner
2016	Sydney International	(Chinese Taipei) Chen Chun-wei	21–13, 21–16	(gold) Winner
2017	Yonex / K&D Graphics International	(Canada) B. R. Sankeerth	14–21, 21–15, 21–16	(gold) Winner
2018	Malaysia International	(Indonesia) Gatjra Piliang Fiqihilahi Cupu	15–21, 11–21	(silver) Runner-up
2022	Denmark Masters	(India) Kiran George	21–18, 21–11	(gold) Winner
2024	North Harbour International	(Australia) Karono	20–22, 11–21	(silver) Runner-up

Men's doubles
Year	Tournament	Partner	Opponent	Score	Result
2017	Yonex / K&D Graphics International	(Chinese Taipei) Lu Chia-pin	(England) Marcus Ellis (England) Chris Langridge	14–21, 17–21	(silver) Runner-up
2018	Yonex / K&D Graphics International	(Chinese Taipei) Lu Chia-pin	(United States) Phillip Chew (United States) Ryan Chew	21–18, 21–10	(gold) Winner

BWF International Challenge tournament
BWF International Series tournament
BWF Future Series tournament
