= Siril Verma =

Indian badminton player (born 1999)

Personal information
- Born: 25 December 1999 (age 26) Telangana, India

Sport
- Country: India
- Sport: Badminton

Men's singles
- Highest ranking: 66 (13 July 2017)
- BWF profile
Medal record
Men's badminton
Representing India
South Asian Games
| Gold medal – first place | 2019 Kathmandu–Pokhara | Men's singles |
| Gold medal – first place | 2019 Kathmandu–Pokhara | Men's team |
World Junior Championships
| Silver medal – second place | 2015 Lima | Boys' singles |

Siril Verma (born 25 December 1999) is an Indian badminton player. He was the silver medalist at the 2015 World Junior Championships. He reached a career high of world no. 1 of the world junior ranking in January 2016. Verma was the gold medalists at the 2019 South Asian Games in the men's singles and team events.

== Achievements ==
=== South Asian Games ===
Men's singles
| Year | Venue | Opponent | Score | Result |
|---|---|---|---|---|
| 2019 | Badminton Covered Hall; Pokhara, Nepal | (India) Aryamann Tandon | 17–21, 23–21, 21–13 | Gold |

=== BWF World Junior Championships ===
Boys' singles
| Year | Venue | Opponent | Score | Result |
|---|---|---|---|---|
| 2015 | Centro de Alto Rendimiento de La Viden; Lima, Peru | (Chinese Taipei) Lu Chia-hung | 21–17, 10–21, 7–21 | Silver |

=== BWF Grand Prix (1 runner-up) ===
The BWF Grand Prix had two levels, the Grand Prix and Grand Prix Gold. It was a series of badminton tournaments sanctioned by the Badminton World Federation (BWF) and played between 2007 and 2017.

Men's singles
| Year | Tournament | Opponent | Score | Result |
|---|---|---|---|---|
| 2016 | Russian Open | (Malaysia) Zulfadli Zulkiffli | 21–16, 19–21, 10–21 | (silver) Runner-up |

BWF Grand Prix Gold tournament
BWF Grand Prix tournament

=== BWF International Challenge/Series (2 runners-up) ===
Men's singles
| Year | Tournament | Opponent | Score | Result |
|---|---|---|---|---|
| 2019 | Maldives International | (India) Kaushal Dharmamer | 13–21, 18–21 | (silver) Runner-up |
| 2021 | Welsh International | (France) Arnaud Merklé | 14–21, 21–11, 15–21 | (silver) Runner-up |

BWF International Challenge tournament
BWF International Series tournament
BWF Future Series tournament
