= 2013 BWF World Junior Championships – Boys singles =

The Boys Singles tournament of the 2013 BWF World Junior Championships was held from October 29 until November 3. Last year champion, Kento Momota couldn't defend his title due to the age eligibility.

South Korean Heo Kwang-hee won the gold medal after beating Wang Tzu-wei from Chinese Taipei 21–11, 21–12 in the final. It was first boys single gold medal for South Korea after 7 years.

== Seeded ==
1. (Malaysia) Soo Teck Zhi (third round)
2. (Thailand) Thammasin Sitthikom (third round)
3. (South Korea) Jeon Hyuk-jin (fourth round)
4. (Germany) Fabian Roth (quarter-final)
5. (Netherlands) Mark Caljouw (fourth round)
6. (South Korea) Heo Kwang-hee (champion)
7. (Czech Republic) Adam Mendrek (third round)
8. (Indonesia) Ihsan Maulana Mustofa (semi-final)
9. (India) Harsheel Dani (second round)
10. (India) Aditya Joshi (third round)
11. (Germany) Lars Schaenzler (second round)
12. (China) Shi Yuqi (fourth round)
13. (Malaysia) Soong Joo Ven (quarter-final)
14. (Netherlands) Justin Teeuwen (second round)
15. (Thailand) Pannawit Thongnuam (quarter-final)
16. (Chinese Taipei) Wang Tzu-wei (final)

== Draw ==
=== Finals ===
Quarterfinals
9/16	(Thailand) Pannawit Thongnuam	10	8
5/8	(Indonesia) Ihsan Maulana Mustofa	21	21
3/4	(Germany) Fabian Roth	16	13
5/8	(South Korea) Heo Kwang-hee	21	21
9/16	(Malaysia) Soong Joo Ven	21	13	10
9/16	(Chinese Taipei) Wang Tzu-wei	11	21	21
(China) Zhao Junpeng	22	21
(Indonesia) Jonatan Christie	20	18

Semifinals
5/8	(Indonesia) Ihsan Maulana Mustofa	18	21	16
5/8	(South Korea) Heo Kwang-hee	21	13	21
9/16	(Chinese Taipei) Wang Tzu-wei	21	21
(China) Zhao Junpeng	12	16

Final
5/8	(South Korea) Heo Kwang-hee	21	21
9/16	(Chinese Taipei) Wang Tzu-wei	11	12

=== Top Half ===
==== Section 1 ====
First round
(Thailand) M Narongrit	21	21
(South Africa) B von Bodenstein	7	12
(Spain) E Penalver	13	19
(Chinese Taipei) Yang S-j	21	21
(Denmark) M Sorensen	21	21
(United States) A Shekhtman	15	9
(Spain) P Sanmartin	21	18	17
(Bulgaria) D Nikolov	10	21	21

Second round
1	(Malaysia) Soo TZ	21	21
(Mexico) L Garrido	11	12
(Thailand) M Narongrit	17	10
(Chinese Taipei) Yang S-j	21	21
9/16	(Thailand) P Thongnuam	21	21
(Macau) Tai KH	9	11
(Denmark) M Sorensen	14	21	21
(Bulgaria) D Nikolov	21	10	11

Third round
1	(Malaysia) Soo TZ	12	15
(Chinese Taipei) Yang S-j	21	21
9/16	(Thailand) P Thongnuam	21	21
(Denmark) M Sorensen	13	13

Fourth round
(Chinese Taipei) Yang S-j	21	9	17
9/16	(Thailand) P Thongnuam	18	21	21

==== Section 2 ====
First round
(Uzbekistan) M Rakhimov	9	11
(Sri Lanka) B Goonathileka	21	21
(Canada) B Lin	21	21
(Sweden) D Ojaaar	13	19
(United States) N Waller	17	14
(India) A George	21	21
(Russia) D Riabov	21	21
(Scotland) A Hall	18	10
(Japan) K Tsuneyama	21	21
(Canada) B Lau	6	8

Second round
5/8	(Indonesia) I Mustofa	21	21
(Botswana) P Leoke	3	4
(Sri Lanka) B Goonathileka	20	19
(Canada) B Lin	22	21
9/16	(Netherlands) J Teeuwen	21	13	8
(India) A George	17	21	21
(Russia) D Riabov	13	12
(Japan) K Tsuneyama	21	21

Third round
5/8	(Indonesia) I Mustofa	21	21
(Canada) B Lin	14	12
(India) A George	17	10
(Japan) K Tsuneyama	21	21

Fourth round
5/8	(Indonesia) I Mustofa	21	21
(Japan) K Tsuneyama	19	18

==== Section 3 ====
First round
(Russia) A Dolotov	6	17
(Indonesia) B Pangisthu	21	21
(Hong Kong) Chang TC	21	21	19
(Malaysia) Cheam JW	19	23	21
(Philippines) P Pantig	11	10
(China) Lin GP	21	21
(Philippines) R Pedrosa	21	21
(Guatemala) R Castellanos	16	15
(Chinese Taipei) Lu C-h	21	21
(Finland) I Heino	13	15

Second round
3/4	(Germany) F Roth	21	21
(Vietnam) Pham CC	18	16
(Indonesia) B Pangisthu	21	21
(Malaysia) Cheam JW	17	15
9/16	(China) Shi YQ	21	15	21
(China) Lin GP	11	21	10
(Philippines) R Pedrosa	12	6
(Chinese Taipei) Lu C-h	21	21

Third round
3/4	(Germany) F Roth	21	21
(Indonesia) B Pangisthu	16	12
9/16	(China) Shi YQ	21	15	21
(Chinese Taipei) Lu C-h	14	21	19

Fourth round
3/4	(Germany) F Roth	21	21
9/16	(China) Shi YQ	13	16

==== Section 4 ====
First round
(Turkey) E Sesalan	16	20
(France) T Citron	21	22
(Bulgaria) V Shishkov	22	21
(Czech Republic) J Louda	20	10
(Sri Lanka) C Handunkuttihettige	5	12
(Japan) Y Onodera	21	21
(Singapore) B Ong	17	21	16
(South Korea) Lee J-s	21	14	21
(Armenia) G Hakobyan	12	15
(Australia) Low PS	21	21

Second round
5/8	(South Korea) Heo K-h	21	21
(Czech Republic) J Janacek	3	7
(France) T Citron	14	10
(Bulgaria) V Shishkov	21	21
9/16	(India) H Dani	25	14	14
(Japan) Y Onodera	23	21	21
(South Korea) Lee J-s	21	21
(Australia) Low PS	12	8

Third round
5/8	(South Korea) Heo K-h	21	21
(Bulgaria) V Shishkov	13	6
(Japan) Y Onodera	21	21
(South Korea) Lee J-s	15	9

Fourth round
5/8	(South Korea) Heo K-h	21	21
(Japan) Y Onodera	10	11

=== Bottom Half ===
==== Section 5 ====
First round
(Uzbekistan) A Bakhshullaev	10	12
(Scotland) J Neil	21	21
(Germany) M Weisskirchen	21	21
(Australia) A Joe	13	17
(Sweden) F Burestedt	21	21
(Turkey) S Zorlu	12	15
(United States) A Khor	24	11	20
(Canada) D Yao	22	21	22
(Macau) Wan WC	10	8
(Denmark) V Svendsen	21	21

Second round
(Scotland) J Neil	22	10	14
(Germany) M Weisskirchen	20	21	21
(Sweden) F Burestedt	24	16	17
9/16	(Malaysia) Soong JV	22	21	21
(Canada) D Yao	9	21
(Denmark) V Svendsen	21	23
(Russia) S Molodov	17	17
5/8	(Netherlands) M Caljouw	21	21

Third round
(Germany) M Weisskirchen	10	11
9/16	(Malaysia) Soong JV	21	21
(Denmark) V Svendsen	16	21
5/8	(Netherlands) M Caljouw	21	23

Fourth round
9/16	(Malaysia) Soong JV	21	21
5/8	(Netherlands) M Caljouw	18	17

==== Section 6 ====
First round
(Bulgaria) S Garev	18	11
(Denmark) J Eipe	21	21
(Thailand) K Wangcharoen	21	21
(Finland) A Lahtinen	12	14
(Singapore) R Ng	12	9
(Japan) Y Igarashi	21	21
(Botswana) T Perekisi	1	6
(South Korea) Choi S-k	21	21
(Uzbekistan) H Azimov	17	7
(Spain) V Riera	21	21

Second round
(Denmark) J Eipe	13	21	16
(Thailand) K Wangcharoen	21	15	21
(Japan) Y Igarashi	12	12
9/16	(Chinese Taipei) Wang T-w	21	21
(South Korea) Choi S-k	21	21
(Spain) V Riera	10	4
(Chinese Taipei) Chen C-c	10	15
3/4	(South Korea) Jeon H-j	21	21

Third round
(Thailand) K Wangcharoen	15	13
9/16	(Chinese Taipei) Wang T-w	21	21
(South Korea) Choi S-k	13	16
3/4	(South Korea) Jeon H-j	21	21

Fourth round
9/16	(Chinese Taipei) Wang T-w	15	21	21
3/4	(South Korea) Jeon H-j	21	18	15

==== Section 7 ====
First round
(Brazil) Y de Oliveira	16	12
(Malaysia) Lim CW	21	21
(Hong Kong) Lee CY	21	14	18
(Indonesia) F Hadmadi	15	21	21
(Finland) V Nieminen	21	21
(Armenia) E Nazaretyan	10	7
(Singapore) D Ng	19	16
(Vietnam) Pham HN	21	21
(Australia) D Guda	11	12
(China) Zhao JP	21	21

Second round
(Malaysia) Lim CW	21	21
(Indonesia) F Hadmadi	19	18
(Finland) V Nieminen	18	16
9/16	(India) A Joshi	21	21
(Vietnam) Pham HN	11	10
(China) Zhao JP	21	21
(Philippines) W Lopez II	13	10
5/8	(Czech Republic) A Mendrek	21	21

Third round
(Malaysia) Lim CW	21	21
9/16	(India) A Joshi	12	14
(China) Zhao JP	21	21
5/8	(Czech Republic) A Mendrek	15	14

Fourth round
(Malaysia) Lim CW	11	10
(China) Zhao JP	21	21

==== Section 8 ====
First round
(Vietnam) Do TD	21	21
(France) L Mittelheisser	18	13
(South Africa) C Coetzer	16	16
(Hong Kong) Tang CM	21	21
(Japan) Y Kobayashi	21	21
(Guatemala) B Samayoa	9	15
(Indonesia) J Christie	21	21
(Sri Lanka) K Halambage	7	11
(Hong Kong) Lee CW	9	8
(China) Sun FX	21	21

Second round
(Vietnam) Do TD	18	16
(Hong Kong) Tang CM	21	21
(Japan) Y Kobayashi	21	12	21
9/16	(Germany) L Schaenzler	14	21	19
(Indonesia) J Christie	21	10	21
(China) Sun FX	11	21	18
(South Africa) M Jennings	6	11
2	(Thailand) T Sitthikom	21	21

Third round
(Hong Kong) Tang CM	10	20
(Japan) Y Kobayashi	21	22
(Indonesia) J Christie	21	21
2	(Thailand) T Sitthikom	18	16

Fourth round
(Japan) Y Kobayashi	22	11
(Indonesia) J Christie	24	21
