= Shi Yuqi =

Chinese badminton player (born 1996)

Shi Yuqi 石宇奇
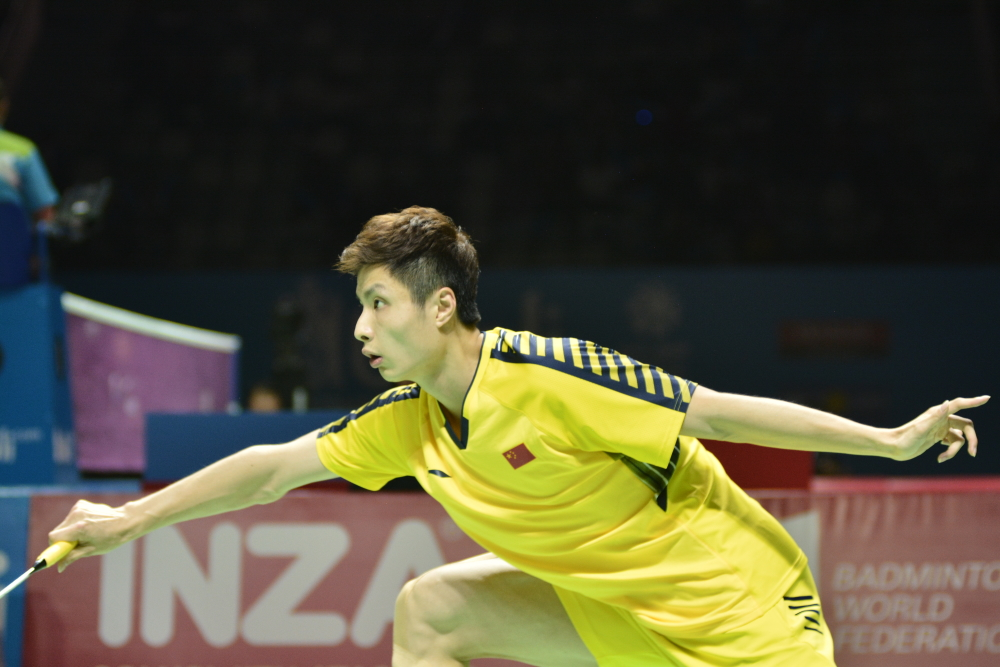

Personal information
- Born: 28 February 1996 (age 30) Nantong, Jiangsu, China
- Height: 1.84 m (6 ft 0 in)

Sport
- Country: China
- Sport: Badminton
- Handedness: Right

Men's singles
- Career record: 380 wins, 112 losses
- Highest ranking: 1 (11 June 2024)
- Current ranking: 7 (3 November 2026)
- BWF profile
Medal record
Men's badminton
Representing China
World Championships
Gold medal – first place	2025 Paris	Men's singles
Silver medal – second place	2018 Nanjing	Men's singles
Sudirman Cup
Gold medal – first place	2019 Nanning	Mixed team
Gold medal – first place	2021 Vantaa	Mixed team
Gold medal – first place	2023 Suzhou	Mixed team
Gold medal – first place	2025 Xiamen	Mixed team
Silver medal – second place	2017 Gold Coast	Mixed team
Thomas Cup
Gold medal – first place	2018 Bangkok	Men's team
Gold medal – first place	2024 Chengdu	Men's team
Gold medal – first place	2026 Horsens	Men's team
Silver medal – second place	2020 Aarhus	Men's team
Asian Games
Gold medal – first place	2018 Jakarta–Palembang	Men's team
Gold medal – first place	2022 Hangzhou	Men's team
Silver medal – second place	2022 Hangzhou	Men's singles
Silver medal – second place	2026 Aichi–Nagoya	Men's team
Asian Championships
Gold medal – first place	2026 Ningbo	Men's singles
Silver medal – second place	2019 Wuhan	Men's singles
Bronze medal – third place	2017 Wuhan	Men's singles
Bronze medal – third place	2024 Ningbo	Men's singles
Asia Mixed Team Championships
Bronze medal – third place	2017 Ho Chi Minh	Mixed team
Asia Team Championships
Silver medal – second place	2018 Alor Setar	Men's team
Youth Olympic Games
Gold medal – first place	2014 Nanjing	Boys' singles
World Junior Championships
Gold medal – first place	2014 Alor Setar	Mixed team
Silver medal – second place	2014 Alor Setar	Boys' singles
Bronze medal – third place	2013 Bangkok	Mixed team
Asian Youth Games
Bronze medal – third place	2013 Nanjing	Boys' singles
Bronze medal – third place	2013 Nanjing	Mixed doubles
Asian Junior Championships
Gold medal – first place	2013 Kota Kinabalu	Mixed team
Gold medal – first place	2014 Taipei	Boys' singles
Gold medal – first place	2014 Taipei	Mixed team
Silver medal – second place	2012 Gimcheon	Mixed team

Shi Yuqi (Chinese: 石宇奇; pinyin: Shí Yǔqí; Mandarin pronunciation: [ʂɻ̩̌.ỳ tɕʰǐ]; born 28 February 1996) is a Chinese badminton player and a world champion in men's singles. He claimed his first Super Series title at the 2016 French Open. At the 2017 All England Open, he defeated six-time champion Lin Dan to reach the final, and repeated the feat again at the 2018 All England Open, where he beat Lin Dan in the final to win the title. He won his second All England Open title at the 2025 edition of the tournament.

Shi won the gold medal at the 2025 World Championships, defeating Thailand's Kunlavut Vitidsarn in the final. The victory came seven years after he won the silver medal at the 2018 World Championships, where he lost to Japan's Kento Momota in the final. He also led his country to multiple team event victories, including the 2019, 2021, 2023, and 2025 editions of the Sudirman Cup, the 2018, 2024 and 2026 editions of the Thomas Cup, and the men’s team event at the 2018 and 2022 Asian Games.

== Early life ==
Shi was born on 28 February 1996, in Nantong, Jiangsu, to parents Shi Lei and Fang Fang. He started playing badminton at age six when he entered a junior sports school in the city to practice badminton. In 2007, he went to Singapore to study as well as play badminton. He enrolled in Yu Neng Primary School and trained at the Singapore Badminton School under ex-SBA chief coach Zhang Qingsong. In 2009, he returned to China after the 2008 financial crisis.

In 2011, he won first place in the Jiangsu Province youth badminton competition. After that, he successfully entered the Jiangsu Province badminton team and became a professional badminton player. In 2012, he participated in the National Youth Championship for the first time and won the championship. At the age of 16, he was selected for the national badminton team.

== Career ==
=== 2012–2015: Youth Olympics gold and Asian Junior Champion ===
In 2012, Shi participated in his first Asian Junior Championships and came in second in the mixed team event after China lost 0–3 to Japan in the final. In the boys' singles event, he lost to C. Rohit Yadav of India in the round of 32 after a three-game battle that lasted for 65 mins. In the 2013 edition of the Asian Junior Badminton Championships, Shi, as a member of the Chinese team, came in first in the mixed team event, beating South Korea 3–1 in the final. He competed at the Asian Youth Games, winning the bronze medals in the boys' singles and mixed doubles, partnered with Chen Yufei. Later that year, Shi made his senior international debut at the Korea Grand Prix Gold where he would lose in the first round to South Korea's Hong Ji-hoon in two straight games after advancing from the qualifiers.

In 2014, Shi had the first breakthrough of his fledgling career. He won the mixed team and boys' singles titles at the Asian Junior Badminton Championships. He first helped China defend its mixed team title by sweeping South Korea 3–0 in the final. In the boys' singles event that followed, he advanced to the final, defeating Kanta Tsuneyama of Japan in three games to win the title. Shi then followed up with another mixed team success at the World Junior Championships, where China defeated Indonesia 3–0 in the final. He also won a silver medal in the boys' singles event after losing to his compatriot Lin Guipu in the final. In August, at the Youth Olympic Games, he won the boys' singles gold after avenging his defeat to Lin Guipu at the World Junior Championships final by defeating him this time.

Shi, however, did not have a good year in 2015; his best showing was at the China Open, where he reached the quarter-finals of the tournament, losing to Son Wan-ho of South Korea in three games.

=== 2016: Three tour titles ===
In 2016, Shi became a first-line player on the Chinese badminton team. He started the season poorly though, reaching only the semi-finals of the Syed Modi International in his first eight on tour. However, his form improved later in the year and he won his first senior title on tour by winning the Indonesia Masters after his compatriot Huang Yuxiang retired in the second game of the final with Shi leading 21–12, 11–0. He followed up from his success by winning the French Open next, beating Lee Hyun-il in two straight games. Shi then continued his rich veins of form by winning the Bitburger Open, beating India's Sourabh Varma in the final.

=== 2017: All England finalist and Asian Championships bronze ===
Shi continued his good form into 2017. He started the season by winning a bronze medal in the Asia Mixed Team Championships where China lost to the eventual winner Japan 1–3 in the semi-finals. In March, he reached the final of the All England Open by beating his senior Lin Dan in the semi-finals. He, however, would lose in the final to Malaysia's Lee Chong Wei in two straight games. Shi reached another final at the Swiss Open, but lost tamely to Lin Dan in the final this time around. In April, he competed in the Asian Championships and finished with a bronze medal after losing to compatriot Chen Long in the semi-finals. In August, Shi participated in his maiden World Championships but was knocked out by Hong Kong's Wong Wing Ki in the third round. At the year-end World Superseries Finals, he lost in the semi-finals to Viktor Axelsen of Denmark.

=== 2018: First All England and World Tour Finals titles, Thomas Cup and Asiad Team Champions, World Championships silver ===
2018 was one of Shi's best seasons to date. He began by winning the India Open in January, beating Chou Tien-chen of Chinese Tapei in two straight games. In February, he won a silver medal in the Asia Team Championships after China lost to Indonesia 1–3 in the final. He started March by reaching the semi-finals of the German Open, where he lost to Ng Ka Long of Hong Kong in three tightly contested games. He then competed at the All England and won the crown, defeating Lin Dan in the final. It was his biggest-ever individual title on tour and his first Super 1000 title. In May, Shi was selected to represent the Chinese team in the Thomas Cup and he did not disappoint, winning the crucial men's singles tie against Kenta Nishimoto in the final, to help his team to a 3–1 victory over Japan. In July, he participated in his second World Championships and made it to the final where he lost to Japan's Kento Momota, thus finishing with a silver medal, which is his best showing in the tournament thus far. In August, Shi participated in the Asian Games men's team event where China claimed the gold medal for a record sixth time after defeating Indonesia 3–1 in the final. In October, he reached his second French Open final but was defeated by Chen Long in two straight games. At the year-end tourney, Shi avenged his defeat at the World Championships by beating Kento Momota 21–12, 21–11 to win his first World Tour Final title.

=== 2019: Sudirman Cup Champion, Asian Championships silver, and First Swiss Open title ===
Shi's first tournament of the season was at the Malaysia Masters where he reached the quarter-finals but was defeated by Malaysia's Daren Liew in three games. In March, his quest to defend his All England title was thwarted by Viktor Axelsen after losing to him in the semi-finals. Shi then bounced back quickly from his disappointment by winning the next tournament, the Swiss Open. There, he defeated B. Sai Praneeth to win his first Swiss Open title. In April, he competed at the Malaysia Open but lost to Lin Dan in the semi-finals. He then participated in the Asian Championships held in Wuhan, China, where he finished with a silver medal, after losing to Kento Momota in the final. In May, at the Sudirman Cup, Shi helped the Chinese team to win their eleventh title after he completed a stunning comeback over World No.1 Kento Momota to clinch China's three-game sweep of Japan. In July, Shi participated in the Indonesia Open where he suffered a horrible ankle injury in a match with Anders Antonsen and had to retire. For the rest of the year, Shi did not perform well. He only reached the final of the Macau Open, where he lost to Thailand's Sitthikom Thammasin.

=== 2020: All England quarter-finalist ===
Shi had a hectic start to the 2020 season, where he participated in three straight tournaments in January to begin the season. He reached the quarter-finals of both the Malaysia Masters and Indonesia Masters, where he lost to Malaysia's Lee Zii Jia and Hong Kong's Lee Cheuk Yiu, respectively. The following week, at the Thailand Masters, Shi managed to reach the semi-finals, where he lost to Ng Ka Long. In March, he competed in the All England Open but was defeated by Viktor Axelsen again albeit, in the quarter-finals this time. This will turn out to be his final tournament of the year as the rest of the tourneys were mostly cancelled after the COVID-19 outbreak.

=== 2021: Second Sudirman Cup and First National Games title ===
In 2021, Shi competed in only four tournaments, namely the delayed Tokyo Olympics in July, the Chinese National Championships, the Sudirman Cup in September, and the delayed Thomas Cup in October. In the Tokyo Olympics, Shi cleared the group stage easily and met Jonatan Christie of Indonesia in the knockout round where he had no problem dispatching his opponent, beating him 21–11, 21–9. In the quarter-final, he faced Viktor Axelsen again and lost, which ended the Olympic campaign. In the Chinese National Championships, he finally claimed his first National Games title after beating Jiangsu teammate Lu Guangzu in the final. In the Sudirman Cup, Shi performed well, helping China defend its title from 2019 against rival Japan in a 3–1 victory. In the Thomas Cup, China reached the final but lost to Indonesia 3–0. He did not play in the final.

==== Controversy ====
Shi played as the first men's singles against Kento Momota of Japan at the 2020 Thomas Cup semi-finals in Aarhus, Denmark. Shi lost the first set 22–20 and retired in the second just as Momota was about to serve at 20–5. This “bizarre” retreat caused some controversy. Shi later cited injuries and tiredness for his withdrawal in a social media post, citing that since he withdrew when the opponent was at 20 points, he has not recorded a loss because it was not at 21. However, that did little to quell netizens' anger, with people calling him out for his unsportsmanlike behaviour.

==== Suspension ====
In an interview before the 2022 Thomas Cup Finals, the president of the Chinese Badminton Association, Zhang Jun, confirmed that after an internal review, Shi had been suspended from the national team and was barred from playing in any international tournaments for one year. The internal ban was due to the infamous incident from the 2020 Thomas Cup competition and the immature comments that he made after the match.

=== 2022: Strong return, two tour titles ===
At the 2022 BWF World Championships held in Tokyo, Japan, Shi returned to action for the first time in 10 months, after serving a ban, and beat Azerbaijan's Ade Resky Dwicahyo and Denmark's Rasmus Gemke in the first two rounds but lost out for a place in the quarter-finals after losing to Indonesia's Anthony Sinisuka Ginting in the third round. The following week, he participated in the Japan Open and played well, reaching the semi-finals where he would lose to Chinese Tapei's Chou Tien-chen in another three-set battle. In October, at the Denmark Open, Shi had his best showing of the season when he defeated Malaysia's Lee Zii Jia in a thrilling three-setter to clinch his maiden Danish title and his first world tour title in three years. After his success in Denmark, Shi would struggle to replicate his best form in the next two tournaments that he competed in. At the French Open, he lost in the first round to Thailand's Sitthikom Thammasin and followed that up with yet another first-round defeat to Singapore's Loh Kean Yew at the Hylo Open in Germany. He then finished the season strongly by winning the Australian Open title after defeating his fellow countryman Lu Guangzu. He is the only men's singles player, besides Viktor Axelsen and Anthony Sinisuka Ginting, who had won 2 or more BWF Tour titles in 2022 despite participating in only 6 competitions that year.

=== 2023: Third Sudirman Cup and Second Asian Team gold ===
Shi began his season at the Malaysia Open but lost to Chou Tien-Chen in the first round in a closely-contested rubber game. At the India Open that followed, he advanced to the second round, where he lost to Viktor Axelsen in another three-set battle. At the Indonesia Masters, Shi made it to the semi-finals, but lost to Jonatan Christie in the process. He continued his busy start to the season by competing in his fourth consecutive tournament at the Thailand Masters. He made it to the semi-finals but was defeated by Chinese Taipei's rising star, Lin Chun-yi, in straight sets. In March, at the German Open, he suffered a shock first round defeat to Kento Momota. The following week, at the prestigious All England Open, Shi beat Malaysia's Lee Zii Jia en route to his third All England final but lost the first game and suffered a meltdown at the second, losing 24–26, 5–21 to his fellow countryman Li Shifeng. At the Swiss Open, Shi experienced another first round loss, this time to H. S. Prannoy in three sets. His inconsistent form continued at the Badminton Asia Championships held in Dubai, where he lost to Lee Cheuk Yiu in the second round.

In May, Shi won all his matches en route to helping China cliched a record 13th Sudirman Cup. In the subsequent months, his performance notably improved, as he advanced to the quarter-finals in 5 out of 7 tournaments, with semi-finals appearances at the Korea and China Open. At the postponed 2022 Asian Games, Shi was a member of China's team that secured victory in the team event. In the individual competition, he progressed to the final but was defeated by his compatriot Li Shifeng. He then participated in the European leg of the tour, competing in Denmark and France, where he reached the semi-finals and quarter-finals, respectively. His consistency continued at the Kumamoto Japan Masters, where he reached the final, losing to Viktor Axelsen. However, Shi's streak of seven consecutive quarter-final or better appearances at the world tour finally came to an end with a surprising defeat on home soil in the second round to Christo Popov at the China Masters.

As a result of his good performance at several tournaments, Shi qualified for the World Tour Finals as the third seed and one of the two only former winners participating (the other being Viktor Axelsen). He advanced to the semi-finals as the top in group by beating Axelsen and Kodai Naraoka. He eventually reached the final but could not replicate his group stage win over Axelsen, losing in straight games.

=== 2024: World No.1, Second World Tour Finals and Four Super 750/1000 titles ===
Shi, who at that time was ranked 6th in the BWF rankings, opened the 2024 season as a finalist at the Malaysia Open, moving him up and matching his career-high rank of world number 2 in the BWF ranking. He then ended his 14-month title drought by winning the India Open. In March, he won his second title of the year in the French Open.

Shi participated in the All England Open, until he retired in the quarter-finals due to a fever, against Jonatan Christie. He would subsequently lose to Jonatan Christie in 3 sets at the 2024 Asian Championships, achieving bronze. At the 2024 Thomas Cup, Shi led China to claim the Thomas Cup, beating 100% of his opponents. At the Singapore Open, Shi won his 3rd Super 750 title of the year, beating his compatriot Li Shifeng in 3 thrilling sets, 17–21, 21–19, 21–19.

Shi claimed his second Super 1000 title of his career at the Indonesia Open defeating his compatriot Li Shifeng in the semi-finals and the number 4 seed Anders Antonsen in the finals, each having been beaten in 3 sets. This was Shi's 4th title halfway into 2024, and 5th final he has reached out of 6 world tours, with each world tour being a Super 750 or Super 1000 title. Following this victory, Shi ascended to his world ranking high of No.1 on 11 June 2024. He made his second appearance at the Olympics in Paris as 1st seed, but was eliminated in the quarter-finals by Kunlavut Vitidsarn.

After the 2024 Olympics, Shi continued to showcase strong performances on the BWF World Tour, though his journey was mixed with both successes and setbacks. At the Japan Open, he advanced to the semi-finals but was defeated by Alex Lanier. Following that, at the Korea Open, he reached the quarter-finals, beating Son Wan-ho and Ng Ka Long but losing to Lee Cheuk Yiu. In the China Open, he was eliminated in the first round by Anthony Sinisuka Ginting. He then competed at the China Masters, where he made it to the semi-finals but was ousted by Jonatan Christie. In a standout performance, Shi triumphed at the BWF World Tour Finals, where he emerged as the champion. His victory at the World Tour Finals marked a successful conclusion to his post-Olympic season.

=== 2025: World Champion, fourth Sudirman Cup, second All England and first China Open titles ===
Shi opened the 2025 season with a title win at the Malaysia Open. He then withdrew from the India Open and went on to reach the semi-finals of the 2025 Indonesia Masters. In March, he captured another All England Open title, defeating Lee Chia-hao in straight sets in the final. At the 2025 Sudirman Cup, Shi led China to a record-extending 14th title, winning all of his matches. He followed that by beating Alex Lanier in straight sets to win the Japan Open. Shi then claimed his first China Open title on home soil, overcoming younger compatriot Wang Zhengxing in a tough three-set match. Despite the victory, he praised Wang’s impact, speed, and strength, acknowledging that Wang surpassed him in those areas due to his younger age.

In the 2025 BWF World Championships, Shi arrived with a new look—dyed golden lock hair—in hope of ending his world title drought. He cruised through the first two rounds, dispatching Lakshya Sen and Julien Carraggi in straight games. His first real test came in the round of 16 against Christo Popov, where he needed three sets to overcome his French counterpart. After losing the first game 20–22, Shi won the next two 21–13 and 21–18. This pattern continued as Shi defeated compatriot Weng Hongyang in the quarter-finals and Canadian sensation Victor Lai in the semi-finals in grueling three games. Against Lai, Shi saved two match points in the second game before taking the third to set up a final with the reigning world champion, Kunlavut Vitidsarn. Vitidsarn took the first game 21–19, but Shi bounced back to win the second 21–10. In the decider, Shi led 11–9 at the interval, and the game stayed tight until Vitidsarn's final error—hitting the shuttle long on the championship point—gave Shi his first World Championships title. Known more for team successes, Shi said afterward: "People often perceive me as performing better in team events. But in individual events, I always give my utmost effort. This time, finally securing my first individual world championship title makes me so delighted. I'm genuinely chuffed."

Two months later, Shi returned at the Denmark Open, reaching the final but losing to Jonatan Christie in three games. At the season-ending 2025 BWF World Tour Finals, Shi injured his toe in the group stage match against Chou Tien-Chen. Despite the injury hindering him, he made it to the final, where he was outplayed by Christo Popov 19-21, 9-21.

=== 2026: Asian Champion, third Thomas Cup ===
Shi started the year with a strong performance, reaching the final of the Malaysia Open. However, he retired in the second game due to right shoulder injury, ceding the title to Vitidsarn. Two months later, he suffered a first-round exist at the All England Open, losing to Lakshya Sen in a grueling three-set match. In April, Shi claimed his first Asian Championships title, defeating Ayush Shetty in straight games 21–8, 21–10 in the final. He then led the Chinese team to victory at the 2026 Thomas Cup, beating every opponent he faced—most notably Anders Antonsen in the semi-final against Denmark and Christo Popov in the final against France.

== Achievements ==
=== BWF World Championships ===
Men's singles
Year	Venue	Opponent	Score	Result	Ref.
2018	Nanjing Youth Olympic Sports Park, Nanjing, China	(Japan) Kento Momota	11–21, 13–21	Silver	
2025	Adidas Arena, Paris, France	(Thailand) Kunlavut Vitidsarn	19–21, 21–10, 21–18	Gold	

=== Asian Games ===
Men's singles
Year	Venue	Opponent	Score	Result	Ref.
2022	Binjiang Gymnasium, Hangzhou, China	(China) Li Shifeng	21–23, 13–21	Silver	

=== Asian Championships ===
Men's singles
Year	Venue	Opponent	Score	Result	Ref.
2017	Wuhan Sports Center Gymnasium, Wuhan, China	(China) Chen Long	19–21, 15–21	Bronze	
2019	Wuhan Sports Center Gymnasium, Wuhan, China	(Japan) Kento Momota	21–12, 18–21, 8–21	Silver	
2024	Ningbo Olympic Sports Center Gymnasium, Ningbo, China	(Indonesia) Jonatan Christie	21–18, 19–21, 12–21	Bronze	
2026	Ningbo Olympic Sports Center Gymnasium, Ningbo, China	(India) Ayush Shetty	21–8, 21–10	Gold	

=== Youth Olympic Games ===
Boys' singles
Year	Venue	Opponent	Score	Result	Ref.
2014	Nanjing Sport Institute, Nanjing, China	(China) Lin Guipu	21–15, 21–19	Gold	

=== World Junior Championships ===
Boys' singles
Year	Venue	Opponent	Score	Result	Ref.
2014	Stadium Sultan Abdul Halim, Alor Setar, Malaysia	(China) Lin Guipu	22–20, 8–21, 18–21	Silver	

=== Asian Youth Games ===
Boys' singles
Year	Venue	Opponent	Score	Result	Ref.
2013	Nanjing Sport Institute, Nanjing, China	(Chinese Taipei) Lai Yu-hua	21–15, 21–15	Bronze	

Mixed doubles
Year	Venue	Partner	Opponent	Score	Result	Ref.
2013	Nanjing Sport Institute; Nanjing, China	(China) Chen Yufei	(Chinese Taipei) Lai Yu-hua (Chinese Taipei) Lee Chia-hsin	21–16, 21–13	Bronze	

=== Asian Junior Championships ===
Boys' singles
Year	Venue	Opponent	Score	Result	Ref.
2014	Taipei Gymnasium, Taipei, Taiwan	(Japan) Kanta Tsuneyama	19–21, 21–16, 21–16	Gold	

=== BWF World Tour (15 titles, 9 runners-up) ===
The BWF World Tour, which was announced on 19 March 2017, and implemented in 2018, is a series of elite badminton tournaments sanctioned by the Badminton World Federation (BWF). The BWF World Tour is divided into levels of World Tour Finals, Super 1000, Super 750, Super 500, Super 300 (part of the HSBC World Tour), and the BWF Tour Super 100.

Men's singles
Year	Tournament	Level	Opponent	Score	Result	Ref.
2018	India Open	Super 500	(Chinese Taipei) Chou Tien-chen	21–18, 21–14	(gold) Winner	
2018	All England Open	Super 1000	(China) Lin Dan	21–19, 16–21, 21–9	(gold) Winner	
2018	French Open	Super 750	(China) Chen Long	17–21, 19–21	(silver) Runner-up	
2018	BWF World Tour Finals	World Tour Finals	(Japan) Kento Momota	21–12, 21–11	(gold) Winner	
2019	Swiss Open	Super 300	(India) B. Sai Praneeth	19–21, 21–18, 21–12	(gold) Winner	
2019	Macau Open	Super 300	(Thailand) Sitthikom Thammasin	21–12, 14–21, 7–21	(silver) Runner-up	
2022	Denmark Open	Super 750	(Malaysia) Lee Zii Jia	21–18, 16–21, 21–12	(gold) Winner	
2022	Australian Open	Super 300	(China) Lu Guangzu	21–19, 18–21, 21–5	(gold) Winner	
2023	All England Open	Super 1000	(China) Li Shifeng	24–26, 5–21	(silver) Runner-up	
2023	Japan Masters	Super 500	(Denmark) Viktor Axelsen	20–22, 17–21	(silver) Runner-up	
2023	BWF World Tour Finals	World Tour Finals	(Denmark) Viktor Axelsen	11–21, 12–21	(silver) Runner-up	
2024	Malaysia Open	Super 1000	(Denmark) Anders Antonsen	14–21, 13–21	(silver) Runner-up	
2024	India Open	Super 750	(Hong Kong) Lee Cheuk Yiu	23–21, 21–17	(gold) Winner	
2024	French Open	Super 750	(Thailand) Kunlavut Vitidsarn	22–20, 21–19	(gold) Winner	
2024	Singapore Open	Super 750	(China) Li Shifeng	17–21, 21–19, 21–19	(gold) Winner	
2024	Indonesia Open	Super 1000	(Denmark) Anders Antonsen	21–9, 12–21, 21–14	(gold) Winner	
2024	BWF World Tour Finals	World Tour Finals	(Denmark) Anders Antonsen	21–18, 21–14	(gold) Winner	
2025	Malaysia Open	Super 1000	(Denmark) Anders Antonsen	21–8, 21–15	(gold) Winner	
2025	All England Open	Super 1000	(Chinese Taipei) Lee Chia-hao	21–17, 21–19	(gold) Winner	
2025	Japan Open	Super 750	(France) Alex Lanier	21–17, 21–15	(gold) Winner	
2025	China Open	Super 1000	(China) Wang Zhengxing	14–21, 21–14, 21–15	(gold) Winner	
2025	Denmark Open	Super 750	(Indonesia) Jonatan Christie	21–13, 15–21, 15–21	(silver) Runner-up	
2025	BWF World Tour Finals	World Tour Finals	(France) Christo Popov	19–21, 9–21	(silver) Runner-up	
2026	Malaysia Open	Super 1000	(Thailand) Kunlavut Vitidsarn	21–23, 1–6 retired	(silver) Runner-up	

=== BWF Superseries (1 title, 1 runner-up) ===
The BWF Superseries, which was launched on 14 December 2006, and implemented in 2007, was a series of elite badminton tournaments, sanctioned by the Badminton World Federation (BWF). BWF Superseries levels were Superseries and Superseries Premier. A season of Superseries consisted of twelve tournaments around the world that had been introduced since 2011. Successful players were invited to the Superseries Finals, which were held at the end of each year.

Men's singles
Year	Tournament	Opponent	Score	Result	Ref.
2016	French Open	(South Korea) Lee Hyun-il	21–16, 21–19	(gold) Winner	
2017	All England Open	(Malaysia) Lee Chong Wei	12–21, 10–21	(silver) Runner-up	

BWF Super Series Finals tournament
BWF Super Series Premier tournament
BWF Super Series tournament

=== BWF Grand Prix (2 titles, 1 runner-up) ===
The BWF Grand Prix had two levels, the Grand Prix and Grand Prix Gold. It was a series of badminton tournaments sanctioned by the Badminton World Federation (BWF) and played between 2007 and 2017.

Men's singles
Year	Tournament	Opponent	Score	Result	Ref.
2016	Indonesian Masters	(China) Huang Yuxiang	21–12, 11–0 retired	(gold) Winner	
2016	Bitburger Open	(India) Sourabh Varma	21–19, 22–20	(gold) Winner	
2017	Swiss Open	(China) Lin Dan	12–21, 11–21	(silver) Runner-up	

BWF Grand Prix Gold tournament
BWF Grand Prix tournament

== Performance timeline ==
Key

W	Won	F	Finalist	SF	Semi-finalist
QF	Quarter-finalist	#R	Rounds 4, 3, 2, 1	RR	Round-robin stage
Q#	Qualification round	A	Absent	w/d	Withdrew
G	Gold	S	Silver	B	Bronze
NH	Not held	N/A	Not applicable	DNQ	Did not qualify

=== National team ===
- Junior level

Team events	2012	2013	2014	Ref
Asian Junior Championships	S	G	G	
World Junior Championships	A	B	G	

- Senior level

Team events	2015	2016	2017	2018	2019	2020	2021	2022	2023	2024	2025	2026	Ref
Asia Team Championships	NH	QF	NH	S	NH	A	NH	A	NH	A	NH	A	
Asia Mixed Team Championships	NH		B	NH	A	NH	A	NH	A	NH	A	NH	
Asian Games	NH			G	NH			G	NH			S	
Thomas Cup	NH	A	NH	G	NH	S	NH	A	NH	G	NH	G	
Sudirman Cup	A	NH	S	NH	G	NH	G	NH	G	NH	G	NH	

=== Individual competitions ===
==== Junior level ====
===== Boys' singles =====
Events	2012	2013	2014	Ref
Asian Junior Championships	3R	QF	G	
World Junior Championships	DNQ	4R	S	
Youth Olympics	NH		G	

==== Senior level ====
===== Men's singles =====
Events	2015	2016	2017	2018	2019	2020	2021	2022	2023	2024	2025	2026	Ref
Asian Championships	A		B	2R	S	NH		A	2R	B	QF	G	
Asian Games	NH			2R	NH			S	NH			3R	
World Championships	A	NH	3R	S	A	NH	A	3R	QF	NH	G	1R	
Olympic Games	NH	DNQ	NH			QF	NH			QF	NH		

Tournament	BWF SS / GP			BWF World Tour									Best	Ref
Tournament	2015	2016	2017	2018	2019	2020	2021	2022	2023	2024	2025	2026	Best	Ref
Malaysia Open	A		1R	QF	SF	NH		A	1R	F	W	F	W ('25)	
India Open	A			W	A	NH		A	2R	W	w/d	w/d	W ('18, '24)	
Indonesia Masters	3R	W	NH	A	2R	QF	A		SF	w/d	SF	A	W ('16)	
Thailand Masters	NH	A				SF	NH		SF	A			SF ('20, '23)	
German Open	A			SF	A				1R	A			SF ('18)	
All England Open	A		F	W	SF	QF	A		F	QF	W	1R	W ('18, '25)	
Swiss Open	A		F	A	W	NH	A		1R	A	w/d	A	W ('19)	
Thailand Open	3R	A					NH	A	1R	A		SF	SF ('26)	
Malaysia Masters	A	1R	A		QF	QF	NH	A				w/d	QF ('19, '20)	
Singapore Open	A		QF	A		NH		A	QF	W	2R	2R	W ('24)	
Indonesia Open	A		2R	SF	2R	NH	A		2R	W	SF	2R	W ('24)	
Australian Open	A		SF	A		NH		W	w/d	A			W ('22)	
Macau Open	A				F	NH				A			F ('19)	
Japan Open	A	QF	SF	1R	w/d	NH		SF	QF	SF	W	QF	W ('25)	
China Open	QF	2R	QF	SF	1R	NH			SF	2R	W	QF	W ('25)	
Chinese Taipei Open	A	3R	A			NH		A					3R ('16)	
Korea Masters	3R	A				NH		A					3R ('15)	
China Masters	A	3R	A	SF	2R	NH			2R	SF	w/d	1R	SF ('18, 24)	
Hong Kong Open	A	1R	SF	1R	2R	NH			A	w/d	A		SF ('17)	
Korea Open	A	1R	A			NH		A	SF	QF	A		SF ('23)	
Denmark Open	A	QF	1R	1R	A			W	SF	A	F	A	W ('22)	
French Open	A	W	QF	F	A	NH	A	1R	QF	W	w/d	A	W ('16, '24)	
Hylo Open	A	W	A					1R	A				W ('16)	
Japan Masters	NH								F	A			F ('23)	
Syed Modi International	A	SF	A		1R	NH		A					SF ('16)	
Superseries / World Tour Finals	DNQ		SF	W	DNQ				F	W	F		W ('18, '24)	
New Zealand Open	A	QF	A			NH							QF ('16)	
Year-end ranking	115	10	8	2	8	9	14	36	6	1	1		1	
Tournament	2015	2016	2017	2018	2019	2020	2021	2022	2023	2024	2025	2026	Best	Ref

== Record against selected opponents ==
Record against Year-end Finals finalists, World Championships semi-finalists, and Olympic quarter-finalists. Accurate as of 8 September 2026.

Player	Matches	Win	Lost	Diff.
(Canada) Victor Lai	1	1	0	+1
(China) Chen Long	7	2	5	–3
(China) Lin Dan	7	5	2	+3
(China) Tian Houwei	1	1	0	+1
(China) Zhao Junpeng	6	6	0	+6
(Chinese Taipei) Chou Tien-Chen	21	15	6	+9
(Denmark) Viktor Axelsen	13	4	9	–5
(Denmark) Anders Antonsen	13	9	4	+5
(Denmark) Jan Ø. Jørgensen	1	1	0	+1
(Denmark) Hans-Kristian Vittinghus	3	3	0	+3
(England) Rajiv Ouseph	6	4	2	+2
(France) Alex Lanier	2	1	1	0
(France) Christo Popov	8	5	3	+2
(India) Srikanth Kidambi	6	2	4	–2
(India) B. Sai Praneeth	5	5	0	+5
(India) Prannoy H. S.	9	7	2	+5

Player	Matches	Win	Lost	Diff.
(India) Lakshya Sen	6	4	2	+2
(Indonesia) Anthony Sinisuka Ginting	13	10	3	+7
(Indonesia) Tommy Sugiarto	4	3	1	+2
(Japan) Kento Momota	12	6	6	0
(Japan) Kodai Naraoka	16	11	5	+6
(Japan) Sho Sasaki	1	1	0	+1
(Malaysia) Lee Chong Wei	5	0	5	–5
(Malaysia) Lee Zii Jia	6	5	1	+4
(Malaysia) Liew Daren	4	3	1	+2
(Singapore) Loh Kean Yew	8	4	4	0
(South Korea) Heo Kwang-hee	1	1	0	+1
(South Korea) Lee Hyun-il	5	4	1	+3
(South Korea) Son Wan-ho	10	6	4	+2
(Thailand) Kunlavut Vitidsarn	11	7	4	+3
(Thailand) Kantaphon Wangcharoen	7	7	0	+7
