= 2013 BWF World Junior Championships – Team event play offs stage =

This article lists the complete results of the playoffs stage of the 2013 BWF World Junior Championships – Teams event in Bangkok, Thailand.

== Position 5-8 ==
=== Thailand vs Vietnam ===
Thailand
3
Hua Mark Stadium Court 1
26 October 2013

Vietnam
0

			1	2	3
1	(Thailand) (Vietnam)	Kittiphon Chairojkanjana / Lam Narissapat; Nguyen Dinh Tuan Kiet / Do Thi Hoai	16; 21	21; 12	21; 10
2	(Thailand) (Vietnam)	Pannawit Thongnuam; Pham Cao Cuong	21; 18	21; 16
3	(Thailand) (Vietnam)	Pornpawee Chochuwong; Dinh Thi Phuong Hong	21; 9	21; 19
4	(Thailand) (Vietnam)	Dechapol Puavaranukroh / Ketlen Kittinupong; Do Tuan Duc / Pham Hong Nam				not played
5	(Thailand) (Vietnam)	Pacharapun Chochuwong / Chanisa Teachavorasinskun; Dinh Thi Phuong Hong / Do Thi Hoai				not played

=== Chinese Taipei vs Malaysia ===
Chinese Taipei
1
Hua Mark Stadium Court 4
26 October 2013

Malaysia
3

			1	2	3
1	(Chinese Taipei) (Malaysia)	Wang Chi-lin / Chang Hsin-tien; Woon Mun Choon / Joyce Choong Wai Chi	21; 14	21; 16
2	(Chinese Taipei) (Malaysia)	Lu Chia-hung; Soong Joo Ven	15; 21	15; 21
3	(Chinese Taipei) (Malaysia)	Lee Yang / Chiang Yu-wei; Muhammad Amzzar Zainuddin / Chua Keh Yeap	21; 14	17; 21	20; 22
4	(Chinese Taipei) (Malaysia)	Yu Chien-hui; Kisona Selvaduray	21; 23	22; 20	19; 21
5	(Chinese Taipei) (Malaysia)	Chang Ching-hui / Chang Hsin-tien; Chin Kah Mun / Ti Wei Chyi				not played

=== 5-6 ===
==== Malaysia vs Thailand ====
Malaysia
3
Hua Mark Stadium Court 8
26 October 2013

Thailand
1

			1	2	3
1	(Malaysia) (Thailand)	Muhammad Amzzar Zainuddin / Woon Mun Choon; Sutichon Pol-Gul / Kittiphon Chairojkanjana	21; 17	21; 19
2	(Malaysia) (Thailand)	Lee Ying Ying; Pornpawee Chochuwong	21; 18	12; 21	8; 21
3	(Malaysia) (Thailand)	Soo Teck Zhi; Pannawit Thongnuam	18; 21	21; 17	21; 11
4	(Malaysia) (Thailand)	Goh Yea Ching / Peck Yen Wei; Pacharapun Chochuwong / Chanisa Teachavorasinskun	21; 12	21; 12
5	(Malaysia) (Thailand)	Chua Keh Yeap / Chin Kah Mun; Thanadol Jumpanoi / Ruethaichanok Laisuan				not played

=== 7-8 ===
==== Chinese Taipei vs Vietnam ====
Chinese Taipei
3
Hua Mark Stadium Court 8
26 October 2013

Vietnam
0

			1	2	3
1	(Chinese Taipei) (Vietnam)	Sung Shuo-yun; Nguyen Thuy Linh	21; 14	19; 21	21; 13
2	(Chinese Taipei) (Vietnam)	Yang Sheng-jie; Do Tuan Duc	21; 11	21; 9
3	(Chinese Taipei) (Vietnam)	Chang Ching-hui / Chang Hsin-tien; Do Thi Hoai / Dinh Thi Phuong Hong	21; 4	21; 18
4	(Chinese Taipei) (Vietnam)	Lee Yang / Chiang Yu-wei; Pham Cao Cuong / Nguyen Dinh Tuan Kiet				not played
5	(Chinese Taipei) (Vietnam)	Tien Tzu-chieh / Chang Ching-hui; Do Tuan Duc / Do Thi Hoai				not played

== Position 9-16 ==
=== Singapore vs Russia ===
Singapore
3
Hua Mark Stadium Court 2
25 October 2013

Russia
0

			1	2	3
1	(Singapore) (Russia)	Terry Hee Yong Kai / Elaine Chua Yi Ling; Alexandr Zinchenko / Olga Morozova	21; 19	21; 18
2	(Singapore) (Russia)	Bernard Ong Soon Yang; Andrey Dolotov	21; 14	21; 9
3	(Singapore) (Russia)	Liang Xiaoyu; Viktoriya Dergunova	22; 20	21; 11
4	(Singapore) (Russia)	Terry Hee Yong Kai / Ryan Ng Zin Rei; Alexandr Zinchenko / Sergey Molodov				not played
5	(Singapore) (Russia)	Elaine Chua Yi Ling / Yeo Jiamin; Olga Morozova / Viktoriya Dergunova				not played

=== France vs Scotland ===
France
3
Hua Mark Stadium Court 3
25 October 2013

Scotland
1

			1	2	3
1	(France) (Scotland)	Vanmael Heriau / Anne Tran; Adam Hall / Heather MacPherson	21; 11	21; 19
2	(France) (Scotland)	Tanguy Citron; Josh Neil	13; 21	17; 21
3	(France) (Scotland)	Delphine Lansac; Julie MacPherson	21; 11	21; 15
4	(France) (Scotland)	Vanmael Heriau / Loic Mittelheisser; Adam Hall / Josh Neil	21; 15	21; 18
5	(France) (Scotland)	Marie Batomene / Anne Tran; Heather MacPherson / Julie MacPherson				not played

=== Germany vs Denmark ===
Germany
1
Hua Mark Stadium Court 6
25 October 2013

Denmark
3

			1	2	3
1	(Germany) (Denmark)	Johannes Pistorius / Marvin Seidel; Mads Storgaard Sorensen / Joel Eipe	24; 22	17; 21	21; 11
2	(Germany) (Denmark)	Luise Heim; Mia Blichfeldt	16; 21	18; 21
3	(Germany) (Denmark)	Lars Schaenzler; Victor Svendsen	18; 21	15; 21
4	(Germany) (Denmark)	Lara Kaepplein / Linda Efler; Julie Finne-Ipsen / Rikke Soby Hansen	19; 21	15; 21
5	(Germany) (Denmark)	Fabian Roth / Jennifer Karnott; Frederik Sogaard Mortensen / Maiken Fruergaard				not played

=== India vs Hong Kong ===
India
1
Hua Mark Stadium Court 8
25 October 2013

Hong Kong
3

			1	2	3
1	(India) (Hong Kong)	Arun George / Santosh Ravuri; Yonny Chung / Yeung Shing Choi	18; 21	21; 9	21; 12
2	(India) (Hong Kong)	Ruthvika Shivani; Ng Tsz Yau	21; 14	18; 21	21; 23
3	(India) (Hong Kong)	Aditya Joshi; Lee Cheuk Yiu	15; 21	22; 20	19; 21
4	(India) (Hong Kong)	Reshma Karthik / Meghana J. Tsang Wing Chiu / Wu Yi Ting	21; 23	11; 21
5	(India) (Hong Kong)	Shlok Ramachandran / Rituparna Das; Tang Chun Man / Ng Wing Yung				not played
