= 2019 Macau Open (badminton) =

2019 badminton tournament

Tournament details
- Dates: 29 October – 3 November
- Level: Super 300
- Total prize money: US$150,000
- Venue: Tap Seac Multi-sports Pavilion
- Location: Macau, China

Champions
- Men's singles: (Thailand) Sitthikom Thammasin
- Women's singles: (Canada) Michelle Li
- Men's doubles: (China) Li Junhui (China) Liu Yuchen
- Women's doubles: (China) Du Yue (China) Li Yinhui
- Mixed doubles: (Thailand) Dechapol Puavaranukroh (Thailand) Sapsiree Taerattanachai

The 2019 Macau Open was a badminton tournament which took place at Tap Seac Multisport Pavilion Macau in Macau from 29 October to 3 November 2019 and had a total prize of $150,000.

== Tournament ==
The 2019 Macau Open was the twenty-second tournament of the 2019 BWF World Tour and also part of the Macau Open championships, which had been held since 2006. This tournament was organized by Badminton Federation of Macau and sanctioned by the BWF.

=== Venue ===
This international tournament was held at Tap Seac Multisport Pavilion Macau in Macau.

=== Point distribution ===
Below is the point distribution table for each phase of the tournament based on the BWF points system for the BWF World Tour Super 300 event.

Winner	Runner-up	3/4	5/8	9/16	17/32	33/64	65/128
7,000	5,950	4,900	3,850	2,750	1,670	660	320

=== Prize money ===
The total prize money for this tournament was US$150,000. Distribution of prize money was in accordance with BWF regulations.

Event	Winner	Finals	Semi-finals	Quarter-finals	Last 16
Singles	$11,250	$5,700	$2,175	$900	$525
Doubles	$11,850	$5,700	$2,100	$1,087.50	$562.50

== Men's singles ==
=== Seeds ===
1. (China) Shi Yuqi (final)
2. (South Korea) Son Wan-ho (second round)
3. (Thailand) Kantaphon Wangcharoen (semi-finals)
4. (India) Sameer Verma (withdrew)
5. (Thailand) Sitthikom Thammasin (champion)
6. (Hong Kong) Lee Cheuk Yiu (first round)
7. (Thailand) Khosit Phetpradab (withdrew)
8. (Malaysia) Liew Daren (first round)

=== Finals ===
Semi-finals
1	(China) Shi Yuqi	21	16	21
3	(Thailand) Kantaphon Wangcharoen	15	21	16
5	(Thailand) Sitthikom Thammasin	21	14	21
(China) Sun Feixiang	16	21	7

Final
1	(China) Shi Yuqi	21	14	7
5	(Thailand) Sitthikom Thammasin	12	21	21

=== Top half ===
==== Section 1 ====
First Round
1	(China) Shi YQ	16	26	21
PFQ	(France) L Claerbout	21	24	11
Q4	(China) Ren PB	21	21
(Indonesia) F A Kholik	10	6
PFQ	(Malaysia) I Zulkarnain	12	25	15
(Thailand) T Saensomboonsuk	21	23	21
(China) Zhao JP	18	21	21
(China) Li SF	21	11	11

Second Round
1	(China) Shi YQ	21	21
Q4	(China) Ren PB	19	18
(Thailand) T Saensomboonsuk	10	18
(China) Zhao JP	21	21

Quarter-finals
1	(China) Shi YQ	21	21
(China) Zhao JP	16	17

==== Section 2 ====
First Round
3	(Thailand) K Wangcharoen	21	22
(China) Zhou ZQ	14	20
PFQ	(Malaysia) Soo T Z	13	22	20
Q2	(Chinese Taipei) Chi Y-j	21	20	22
6	(Hong Kong) Lee C Y	19	16
Q1	(Canada) Sheng XD	21	21
WC	(Macau) Pui P F	9	10
(Thailand) K Vitidsarn	21	21

Second Round
3	(Thailand) K Wangcharoen	15	21	21
Q2	(Chinese Taipei) Chi Y-j	21	13	12
Q1	(Canada) Sheng XD	20	15
(Thailand) K Vitidsarn	22	21

Quarter-finals
3	(Thailand) K Wangcharoen	21	21
(Thailand) K Vitidsarn	19	19

=== Bottom half ===
==== Section 3 ====
First Round
(Malaysia) Cheam J W	16	16
(South Korea) Lee D-k	21	21
(Malaysia) Soong J V	21	8	11
5	(Thailand) S Thammasin	17	21	21
(France) B Leverdez	21	14	21
Q3	(Malaysia) A S Ali Sadikin	13	21	10
(Thailand) S Avihingsanon	9	16
PFQ	(Japan) K Naraoka	21	21

Second Round
(South Korea) Lee D-k	14	13
5	(Thailand) S Thammasin	21	21
(France) B Leverdez	21	9	14
PFQ	(Japan) K Naraoka	16	21	21

Quarter-finals
5	(Thailand) S Thammasin	21	21
PFQ	(Japan) K Naraoka	13	18

==== Section 4 ====
First Round
PFQ	(Chinese Taipei) Lin C-y	21	21
(Hong Kong) Wong W K	15	8
(Indonesia) C A Dwi Wardoyo	21	21
8	(Malaysia) Liew D	16	18
(China) Sun FX	21	21
PFQ	(India) A Jayaram	16	16
(Chinese Taipei) Lu C-h	21	11	12
2	(South Korea) Son W-h	18	21	21

Second Round
PFQ	(Chinese Taipei) Lin C-y	12	21	16
(Indonesia) C A Dwi Wardoyo	21	17	21
(China) Sun FX	21	21
2	(South Korea) Son W-h	10	17

Quarter-finals
(Indonesia) C A Dwi Wardoyo	10	17
(China) Sun FX	21	21

== Women's singles ==
=== Seeds ===
1. (Canada) Michelle Li (champion)
2. (South Korea) Sung Ji-hyun (first round)
3. (China) Han Yue (final)
4. (United States) Zhang Beiwen (second round)
5. (Thailand) Busanan Ongbamrungphan (quarter-finals)
6. (China) Cai Yanyan (quarter-finals)
7. (South Korea) An Se-young (withdrew)
8. (South Korea) Kim Ga-eun (semi-finals)

=== Finals ===
Semi-finals
1	(Canada) Michelle Li	21	21
8	(South Korea) Kim Ga-eun	9	19
3	(China) Han Yue	21	21
PFQ	(Japan) Natsuki Nidaira	14	11

Final
1	(Canada) Michelle Li	21	21
3	(China) Han Yue	18	8

=== Top half ===
==== Section 1 ====
First Round
1	(Canada) M Li	21	21
(South Korea) Kim H-m	13	19
(United States) I Zhong	21	11
Q4	(Hong Kong) Leung Y Y	23	21
6	(China) Cai YY	21	21
(India) S U R Chukka	19	12
Q2	(Chinese Taipei) Lin Y-c	16	17
(Hong Kong) Yip P Y	21	21

Second Round
1	(Canada) M Li	21	28	21
Q4	(Hong Kong) Leung Y Y	17	30	12
6	(China) Cai YY	21	21
(Hong Kong) Yip P Y	12	11

Quarter-finals
1	(Canada) M Li	21	21
6	(China) Cai YY	14	18

==== Section 2 ====
First Round
4	(United States) Zhang BW	21	21
Q3	(Hong Kong) Cheung Y M	8	8
(Thailand) P Buranaprasertsuk	22	13	16
(Indonesia) R Hartawan	20	21	21
8	(South Korea) Kim G-e	21	21	21
Q1	(China) Zhou M	14	23	17
(Thailand) N Jindapol	21	21
(South Korea) Sim Y-j	17	9

Second Round
4	(United States) Zhang BW	19	18
(Indonesia) R Hartawan	21	21
8	(South Korea) Kim G-e	21	19	22
(Thailand) N Jindapol	11	21	20

Quarter-finals
(Indonesia) R Hartawan	23	9	16
8	(South Korea) Kim G-e	21	21	21

=== Bottom half ===
==== Section 3 ====
First Round
(Chinese Taipei) Chiang Y-l	w	/	o
(Chinese Taipei) Hung Y-t
(Indonesia) L A Mainaky	11	16
5	(Thailand) B Ongbamrungphan	21	21
(United States) I Wang	18	15
(Chinese Taipei) Pai Y-p	21	21
PFQ	(Chinese Taipei) Liang T-y	18	12
3	(China) Han Y	21	21

Second Round
(Chinese Taipei) Chiang Y-l	6	5
5	(Thailand) B Ongbamrungphan	21	21
(Chinese Taipei) Pai Y-p	4	14
3	(China) Han Y	21	21

Quarter-finals
5	(Thailand) B Ongbamrungphan	13	19
3	(China) Han Y	21	21

==== Section 4 ====
First Round
(Thailand) P Chaiwan	9	13
(Hong Kong) Cheung N Y	21	21
(Thailand) S Katethong	21	19	11
PFQ	(Japan) N Nidaira	11	21	21
(China) Zhang YM	21	21
(United States) C Pan	16	17
(China) Wang ZY	21	21
2	(South Korea) Sung J-h	17	10

Second Round
(Hong Kong) Cheung N Y	21	15	15
PFQ	(Japan) N Nidaira	12	21	21
(China) Zhang YM	21	21
(China) Wang ZY	12	17

Quarter-finals
PFQ	(Japan) N Nidaira	21	23
(China) Zhang YM	11	21

== Men's doubles ==
=== Seeds ===
1. (China) Li Junhui / Liu Yuchen (champions)
2. (Chinese Taipei) Lee Yang / Wang Chi-lin (quarter-finals)
3. (Chinese Taipei) Liao Min-chun / Su Ching-heng (second round)
4. (Chinese Taipei) Lu Ching-yao / Yang Po-han (quarter-finals)
5. (South Korea) Kim Gi-jung / Lee Yong-dae (withdrew)
6. (Malaysia) Goh Sze Fei / Nur Izzuddin Mohd Rumsani (semi-finals)
7. (Chinese Taipei) Lee Jhe-huei / Yang Po-hsuan (quarter-finals)
8. (China) Huang Kaixiang / Liu Cheng (final)

=== Finals ===
Semi-finals
1	(China) Li Junhui (China) Liu Yuchen	21	22
6	(Malaysia) Goh Sze Fei (Malaysia) Nur Izzuddin Mohd Rumsani	16	20
8	(China) Huang Kaixiang (China) Liu Cheng	21	22
(China) Ou Xuanyi (China) Zhang Nan	11	20

Final
1	(China) Li Junhui (China) Liu Yuchen	21	18	22
8	(China) Huang Kaixiang (China) Liu Cheng	8	21	20

=== Top half ===
==== Section 1 ====
First Round
1	(China) Li JH (China) Liu YC	21	21
(Malaysia) Shia C K (Malaysia) Tan B H	18	16
Q4	(Malaysia) Chang Y J (Malaysia) Tee K W	23	18	25
(Malaysia) M Arif A L (Malaysia) N M Azriyn A	21	21	27
7	(Chinese Taipei) Lee J-h (Chinese Taipei) Yang P-h	21	21
(Thailand) T Isriyanet (Thailand) K Kedren	16	18
(England) Chun K L (England) F M Hassan	10	8
(Australia) S Leung W H (Australia) M Wheller	21	21

Second Round
1	(China) Li JH (China) Liu YC	21	21
(Malaysia) M Arif A L (Malaysia) N M Azriyn A	16	15
7	(Chinese Taipei) Lee J-h (Chinese Taipei) Yang P-h	21	21
(Australia) S Leung W H (Australia) M Wheller	9	6

Quarter-finals
1	(China) Li JH (China) Liu YC	21	21
7	(Chinese Taipei) Lee J-h (Chinese Taipei) Yang P-h	15	13

==== Section 2 ====
First Round
4	(Chinese Taipei) Lu C-y (Chinese Taipei) Yang P-h	21	21
(Chinese Taipei) Lin S-k (Chinese Taipei) Tseng M-h	18	10
(Chinese Taipei) Chang K-c (Chinese Taipei) Lu C-p	19	19
(Hong Kong) Chang T C (Hong Kong) Yeung M N	21	21
6	(Malaysia) Goh S F (Malaysia) N Izzuddin M R	21	21
(Hong Kong) Lam W L (Hong Kong) Li K H	14	17
(South Korea) Na S-s (South Korea) Wang C	21	18	23
Q3	(Chinese Taipei) Lee S-m (Chinese Taipei) Lin Y-s	14	21	21

Second Round
4	(Chinese Taipei) Lu C-y (Chinese Taipei) Yang P-h	12	23	21
(Hong Kong) Chang T C (Hong Kong) Yeung M N	21	21	15
6	(Malaysia) Goh S F (Malaysia) N Izzuddin M R	21	21	21
(South Korea) Na S-s (South Korea) Wang C	17	23	17

Quarter-finals
4	(Chinese Taipei) Lu C-y (Chinese Taipei) Yang P-h	12	16
6	(Malaysia) Goh S F (Malaysia) N Izzuddin M R	21	21

=== Bottom half ===
==== Section 3 ====
First Round
Q1	(Malaysia) M S Mohd Ismail (Malaysia) Ng C W	5	2
(Thailand) N Phuangphuapet (Thailand) T Viriyangkura	21	21
(Hong Kong) Chung Y (Hong Kong) Tam C H	17	16
8	(China) Huang KX (China) Liu C	21	21
(India) V K H Ranganatha (India) A Surya	14	14
(Chinese Taipei) Lin C-y (Chinese Taipei) Yang M-t	21	21
(Malaysia) Chen T J (Malaysia) Choong H J	21	15	19
3	(Chinese Taipei) Liao M-c (Chinese Taipei) Su C-h	16	21	21

Second Round
(Thailand) N Phuangphuapet (Thailand) T Viriyangkura	12	19
8	(China) Huang KX (China) Liu C	21	21
(Chinese Taipei) Lin C-y (Chinese Taipei) Yang M-t	20	21	21
3	(Chinese Taipei) Liao M-c (Chinese Taipei) Su C-h	22	16	14

Quarter-finals
8	(China) Huang KX (China) Liu C	21	21
(Chinese Taipei) Lin C-y (Chinese Taipei) Yang M-t	18	8

==== Section 4 ====
First Round
(Chinese Taipei) Kan C-y (Chinese Taipei) Liao C-h	6	16
(China) Ou XY (China) Zhang N	21	21
(Thailand) B Isara (Thailand) M Jongjit	9	8^{r}
PFQ	(Hong Kong) Mak H C (Hong Kong) Or C C	21	11
(South Korea) Kang M-h (South Korea) Kim J-h	21	21
Q2	(Hong Kong) Law C H (Hong Kong) Yeung S C	12	16
(Malaysia) Low H Y (Malaysia) Ng E C	21	23	16
2	(Chinese Taipei) Lee Y (Chinese Taipei) Wang C-l	23	21	21

Second Round
(China) Ou XY (China) Zhang N	18	21	21
PFQ	(Hong Kong) Mak H C (Hong Kong) Or C C	21	13	19
(South Korea) Kang M-h (South Korea) Kim J-h	12	16
2	(Chinese Taipei) Lee Y (Chinese Taipei) Wang C-l	21	21

Quarter-finals
(China) Ou XY (China) Zhang N	12	21	21
2	(Chinese Taipei) Lee Y (Chinese Taipei) Wang C-l	21	17	14

== Women's doubles ==
=== Seeds ===
1. (China) Du Yue / Li Yinhui (champions)
2. (Thailand) Jongkolphan Kititharakul / Rawinda Prajongjai (final)
3. (China) Li Wenmei / Zheng Yu (semi-finals)
4. (Indonesia) Della Destiara Haris / Rizki Amelia Pradipta (semi-finals)
5. (France) Émilie Lefel / Anne Tran (withdrew)
6. (Australia) Setyana Mapasa / Gronya Somerville (second round)
7. (Chinese Taipei) Hsu Ya-ching / Hu Ling-fang (second round)
8. (India) Meghana Jakkampudi / Poorvisha S. Ram (first round)

=== Finals ===
Semi-finals
1	(China) Du Yue (China) Li Yinhui	21	21
4	(Indonesia) Della Destiara Haris (Indonesia) Rizki Amelia Pradipta	19	16
3	(China) Li Wenmei (China) Zheng Yu	17	19
2	(Thailand) Jongkolphan Kititharakul (Thailand) Rawinda Prajongjai	21	21

Final
1	(China) Du Yue (China) Li Yinhui	21	10	21
2	(Thailand) Jongkolphan Kititharakul (Thailand) Rawinda Prajongjai	16	21	12

=== Top half ===
==== Section 1 ====
First Round
(Macau) Gong X X (Macau) Ng W C	15	12
(Chinese Taipei) Kuo Y-w (Chinese Taipei) Lin W-c	21	21
6	(Australia) S Mapasa (Australia) G Somerville	w	/	o
(Chinese Taipei) Liang T-y (Chinese Taipei) Lin S-y
(Hong Kong) Ng T Y (Hong Kong) Yuen S Y	22	21	21
(Hong Kong) Ng S Y (Hong Kong) Yau M Y	24	19	18

Second Round
1	(China) Du Y (China) Li YH	21	21
(Chinese Taipei) Kuo Y-w (Chinese Taipei) Lin W-c	17	17
6	(Australia) S Mapasa (Australia) G Somerville	23	18
(Hong Kong) Ng T Y (Hong Kong) Yuen S Y	25	21

Quarter-finals
1	(China) Du Y (China) Li YH	21	21
(Hong Kong) Ng T Y (Hong Kong) Yuen S Y	8	13

==== Section 2 ====
First Round
(Indonesia) N V Marwah (Indonesia) P Syaikah	21	14	17
(Chinese Taipei) Cheng C-y (Chinese Taipei) Lee C-c	11	21	21
5	(France) É Lefel (France) A Tran
(Malaysia) P Tan K L (Malaysia) Thinaah M	w	/	o
(Hong Kong) Ng W Y (Hong Kong) Yeung N T	20	10
(Indonesia) S F S Ramadhanti (Indonesia) R Sugiarto	22	21

Second Round
4	(Indonesia) D D Haris (Indonesia) R A Pradipta	18	21	21
(Chinese Taipei) Cheng c-y (Chinese Taipei) Lee c-c	21	18	16
(Malaysia) P Tan K L (Malaysia) Thinaah M	14	20
(Indonesia) S F S Ramadhanti (Indonesia) R Sugiarto	21	22

Quarter-finals
4	(Indonesia) D D Haris (Indonesia) R A Pradipta	21	21
(Indonesia) S F S Ramadhanti (Indonesia) R Sugiarto	18	11

=== Bottom half ===
==== Section 3 ====
First Round
(Chinese Taipei) Chang C-h (Chinese Taipei) Yang C-t	6	14
(South Korea) Jeong N-e (South Korea) Kim H-j	21	21
(Hong Kong) Fan K Y (Hong Kong) Wu Y T	14	17
7	(Chinese Taipei) Hsu Y-c (Chinese Taipei) Hu L-f	21	21
(Malaysia) Cheah Y S (Malaysia) Peck Y W
(Malaysia) A Ching Y C (Malaysia) Lim C S	w	/	o

Second Round
(South Korea) Jeong N-e (South Korea) Kim H-j	19	21	21
7	(Chinese Taipei) Hsu Y-c (Chinese Taipei) Hu L-f	21	14	17
(Malaysia) A Ching Y C (Malaysia) Lim C S	14	14
3	(China) Li WM (China) Zheng Y	21	21

Quarter-finals
(South Korea) Jeong N-e (South Korea) Kim H-j	21	14	11
3	(China) Li WM (China) Zheng Y	18	21	21

==== Section 4 ====
First Round
(Chinese Taipei) Liu C-y (Chinese Taipei) Wang Y-q	21	21
(Hong Kong) Leung Y Y (Hong Kong) Wong C C	16	18
(China) Lin FL (China) Zhou XR	21	21
8	(India) M Jakkampudi (India) P S. Ram	17	19
(Indonesia) D B Anjani (Indonesia) F Iwasaki	12	16
(Chinese Taipei) Lee C-h (Chinese Taipei) Lin J-y	21	21

Second Round
(Chinese Taipei) Liu C-y (Chinese Taipei) Wang Y-q	19	21	21
(China) Lin FL (China) Zhou XR	21	15	17
(Chinese Taipei) Lee C-h (Chinese Taipei) Lin J-y	6	21	6
2	(Thailand) J Kititharakul (Thailand) R Prajongjai	21	16	21

Quarter-finals
(Chinese Taipei) Liu C-y (Chinese Taipei) Wang Y-q	13	11
2	(Thailand) J Kititharakul (Thailand) R Prajongjai	21	21

== Mixed doubles ==
=== Seeds ===
1. (Thailand) Dechapol Puavaranukroh / Sapsiree Taerattanachai (champions)
2. (Indonesia) Praveen Jordan / Melati Daeva Oktavianti (withdrew)
3. (Indonesia) Hafiz Faizal / Gloria Emanuelle Widjaja (quarter-finals)
4. (Hong Kong) Tang Chun Man / Tse Ying Suet (quarter-finals)
5. (Chinese Taipei) Lee Jhe-huei / Hsu Ya-ching (quarter-finals)
6. (Chinese Taipei) Wang Chi-lin / Cheng Chi-ya (final)
7. (Hong Kong) Chang Tak Ching / Ng Wing Yung (first round)
8. (Malaysia) Hoo Pang Ron / Cheah Yee See (semi-finals)

=== Finals ===
Semi-finals
1	(Thailand) Dechapol Puavaranukroh (Thailand) Sapsiree Taerattanachai	21	22
(China) Feng Yanzhe (China) Lin Fangling	11	20
6	(Chinese Taipei) Wang Chi-lin (Chinese Taipei) Cheng Chi-ya	21	15	22
8	(Malaysia) Hoo Pang Ron (Malaysia) Cheah Yee See	12	21	20

Final
1	(Thailand) Dechapol Puavaranukroh (Thailand) Sapsiree Taerattanachai	21	21
6	(Chinese Taipei) Wang Chi-lin (Chinese Taipei) Cheng Chi-ya	11	8

=== Top half ===
==== Section 1 ====
First Round
1	(Thailand) D Puavaranukroh (Thailand) S Taerattanachai	21	21
(China) Dai EY (China) Zhou XR	14	17
(Macau) Leong I C (Macau) Weng C N	10	9
(South Korea) Wang C (South Korea) Jeong N-e	21	21
5	(Chinese Taipei) Lee J-h (Chinese Taipei) Hsu Y-c	21	21
Q4	(Thailand) K Vitidsarn (Thailand) P Chaiwan	15	16
(Chinese Taipei) Lu C-y (Chinese Taipei) Lee C-h	21	21
(Malaysia) M Arif A L (Indonesia) R A Riodingin	18	16

Second Round
1	(Thailand) D Puavaranukroh (Thailand) S Taerattanachai	22	21
(South Korea) Wang C (South Korea) Jeong N-e	20	16
5	(Chinese Taipei) Lee J-h (Chinese Taipei) Hsu Y-c	20	21	21
(Chinese Taipei) Lu C-y (Chinese Taipei) Lee C-h	22	17	17

Quarter-finals
1	(Thailand) D Puavaranukroh (Thailand) S Taerattanachai	21	20	21
5	(Chinese Taipei) Lee J-h (Chinese Taipei) Hsu Y-c	9	22	16

==== Section 2 ====
First Round
4	(Hong Kong) Tang C M (Hong Kong) Tse Y S	21	21
(Hong Kong) Yeung M N (Hong Kong) Ng T Y	8	18
(Thailand) S Jomkoh (Thailand) S Paewsampran	19	21	25
(Indonesia) A Maulana (Indonesia) M C Bandaso	21	18	27
7	(Hong Kong) Chang T C (Hong Kong) Ng W Y	21	19	18
(Hong Kong) Mak H C (Hong Kong) Chau H W	18	21	21
(Chinese Taipei) Lee Y (Chinese Taipei) Yang C-t	19	21	18
(China) Feng YZ (China) Lin FL	21	12	21

Second Round
4	(Hong Kong) Tang C M (Hong Kong) Tse Y S	19	21	21
(Indonesia) A Maulana (Indonesia) M C Bandaso	21	15	13
(Hong Kong) Mak H C (Hong Kong) Chau H W	14	17
(China) Feng YZ (China) Lin FL	21	21

Quarter-finals
4	(Hong Kong) Tang C M (Hong Kong) Tse Y S	21	14	17
(China) Feng YZ (China) Lin FL	15	21	21

=== Bottom half ===
==== Section 3 ====
First Round
Q2	(Chinese Taipei) Chang K-c (Chinese Taipei) Chang H-t	21	21
(Australia) S Leung W H (Australia) G Somerville	18	15
Q3	(Chinese Taipei) Lee S-m (Chinese Taipei) Liu C-y	11	20
6	(Chinese Taipei) Wang C-l (Chinese Taipei) Cheng C-y	21	22
(United States) M Fogarty (United States) I Zhong	10	10
(Hong Kong) Tam C H (Hong Kong) Yeung N T	21	21
(South Korea) Na S-s (South Korea) Kim H-j	20	11
3	(Indonesia) H Faizal (Indonesia) G E Widjaja	22	21

Second Round
Q2	(Chinese Taipei) Chang K-c (Chinese Taipei) Chang H-t	12	16
6	(Chinese Taipei) Wang C-l (Chinese Taipei) Cheng C-y	21	21
(Hong Kong) Tam C H (Hong Kong) Yeung N T	13	9
3	(Indonesia) H Faizal (Indonesia) G E Widjaja	21	21

Quarter-finals
6	(Chinese Taipei) Wang C-l (Chinese Taipei) Cheng C-y	22	28
3	(Indonesia) H Faizal (Indonesia) G E Widjaja	20	26

==== Section 4 ====
First Round
PFQ	(Hong Kong) Chung Y (Hong Kong) Ng S Y	14	21	21
(Chinese Taipei) Yang P-hs (Chinese Taipei) Hu L-f	21	17	10
(Hong Kong) Yeung S C (Hong Kong) Fan K Y	15	13
8	(Malaysia) Hoo P R (Malaysia) Cheah Y S	21	21
(India) A Surya (India) P P Chimulkar	w	/	o
Q1
(Chinese Taipei) Lin Y-s (Chinese Taipei) Lin W-c	22	21
PFQ	(Hong Kong) Law C H (Hong Kong) Wu Y T	20	15

Second Round
PFQ	(Hong Kong) Chung Y (Hong Kong) Ng S Y	15	9
8	(Malaysia) Hoo P R (Malaysia) Cheah Y S	21	21
(India) A Surya (India) P P Chimulkar	17	16
(Chinese Taipei) Lin Y-s (Chinese Taipei) Lin W-c	21	21

Quarter-finals
8	(Malaysia) Hoo P R (Malaysia) Cheah Y S	14	21	21
(Chinese Taipei) Lin Y-s (Chinese Taipei) Lin W-c	21	18	13

Preceded by 2019 French Open	BWF World Tour; 2019 BWF season	Succeeded by 2019 SaarLorLux Open
