= 2017 Badminton Asia Mixed Team Championships =

Tournament details
- Dates: 14–19 February
- Edition: 1
- Venue: Nguyen Du Cultural Sport Club
- Location: Ho Chi Minh City, Vietnam

The 2017 Badminton Asia Mixed Team Championships was the first edition of Badminton Asia Mixed Team Championships, held at the Nguyen Du Cultural Sport Club in Ho Chi Minh City, Vietnam, on 14–19 February 2017 and were organised by Vietnam Badminton Federation and Ho Chi Minh City Badminton Association.

== Medalists ==
Event	Gold	Silver	Bronze
Mixed team	Japan; Akane Yamaguchi; Arisa Higashino; Ayaka Takahashi; Ayane Kurihara; Hiroyuki Endo; Kazumasa Sakai; Keigo Sonoda; Kenta Kazuno; Kenta Nishimoto; Koharu Yonemoto; Misaki Matsutomo; Sayaka Sato; Shiho Tanaka; Takeshi Kamura; Takuro Hoki; Yuta Watanabe	South Korea; Chae Yoo-jung; Chang Ye-na; Choi Sol-gyu; Jeon Hyeok-jin; Kim Ga-eun; Kim Gi-jung; Kim Ha-na; Kim Jae-hwan; Lee So-hee; Son Wan-ho; Sung Ji-hyun; Yoo Yeon-seong	China; Bao Yixin; Chen Qingchen; Chen Yufei; He Bingjiao; Huang Dongping; Jia Yifan; Li Junhui; Li Yinhui; Liu Cheng; Liu Yuchen; Qiao Bin; Shi Yuqi; Yu Xiaohan; Zhang Nan; Zhao Junpeng; Zheng Siwei
Mixed team	Japan; Akane Yamaguchi; Arisa Higashino; Ayaka Takahashi; Ayane Kurihara; Hiroyuki Endo; Kazumasa Sakai; Keigo Sonoda; Kenta Kazuno; Kenta Nishimoto; Koharu Yonemoto; Misaki Matsutomo; Sayaka Sato; Shiho Tanaka; Takeshi Kamura; Takuro Hoki; Yuta Watanabe	South Korea; Chae Yoo-jung; Chang Ye-na; Choi Sol-gyu; Jeon Hyeok-jin; Kim Ga-eun; Kim Gi-jung; Kim Ha-na; Kim Jae-hwan; Lee So-hee; Son Wan-ho; Sung Ji-hyun; Yoo Yeon-seong	Thailand; Adulrach Namkul; Bodin Isara; Busanan Ongbamrungphan; Dechapol Puavaranukroh; Jongkolphan Kititharakul; Khosit Phetpradab; Kittinupong Kedren; Nipitphon Phuangphuapet; Nitchaon Jindapol; Pornpawee Chochuwong; Puttita Supajirakul; Rawinda Prajongjai; Sapsiree Taerattanachai; Savitree Amitrapai; Suppanyu Avihingsanon; Tanongsak Saensomboonsuk

== Group stage ==
=== Group A ===
Team	Pld	W	L	MF	MA	MD	Pts
China	2	2	0	10	0	+10	4
Chinese Taipei	2	1	1	4	6	−2	2
Hong Kong	2	0	2	1	9	−8	0

14 February 2017
China	5–0	Hong Kong
15 February 2017
Chinese Taipei	4–1	Hong Kong
16 February 2017
China	5–0	Chinese Taipei

=== Group B ===
Team	Pld	W	L	MF	MA	MD	Pts
Indonesia	2	2	0	8	2	+6	4
Malaysia	2	1	1	7	3	+4	2
Sri Lanka	2	0	2	0	10	−10	0

14 February 2017
Malaysia	5–0	Sri Lanka
15 February 2017
Indonesia	5–0	Sri Lanka
16 February 2017
Malaysia	2–3	Indonesia

=== Group C ===
Team	Pld	W	L	MF	MA	MD	Pts
Thailand	3	3	0	13	2	+11	6
Japan	3	2	1	12	3	+9	4
Vietnam	3	1	2	3	12	−9	2
Philippines	3	0	3	2	13	−11	0

14 February 2017
Thailand	5–0	Vietnam
Japan	5–0	Philippines
15 February 2017
Japan	5–0	Vietnam
Thailand	5–0	Philippines
16 February 2017
Vietnam	3–2	Philippines
Japan	2–3	Thailand

=== Group D ===
Team	Pld	W	L	MF	MA	MD	Pts
South Korea	2	2	0	9	1	+8	4
India	2	1	1	5	5	0	2
Singapore	2	0	2	1	9	−8	0

14 February 2017
South Korea	5–0	Singapore
15 February 2017
India	4–1	Singapore
16 February 2017
South Korea	4–1	India

== Knockout stage ==
Quarter-finals
17 February
China	3
Malaysia	0
17 February
Indonesia	2
Japan	3
17 February
India	2
Thailand	3
17 February
Chinese Taipei	0
South Korea	3

Semi-finals
18 February
China	1
Japan	3
18 February
Thailand	1
South Korea	3

Final
19 February
Japan	3
South Korea	0

=== Quarterfinals ===
Indonesia
2
Report
17 February 2017

Japan
3

			1	2	3
1	(Indonesia) (Japan)	Angga Pratama / Ricky Karanda Suwardi; Takeshi Kamura / Keigo Sonoda	22; 20	12; 21	21; 14
2	(Indonesia) (Japan)	Hanna Ramadini; Sayaka Sato	21; 18	23; 21
3	(Indonesia) (Japan)	Muhammad Bayu Pangisthu; Kenta Nishimoto	15; 21	16; 21
4	(Indonesia) (Japan)	Anggia Shitta Awanda / Tiara Rosalia Nuraidah; Misaki Matsutomo / Ayaka Takahashi	14; 21	13; 21
5	(Indonesia) (Japan)	Edi Subaktiar / Annisa Saufika; Yuta Watanabe / Arisa Higashino	16; 21	17; 21

India
2
Report
17 February 2017

Thailand
3

			1	2	3
1	(India) (Thailand)	Pranav Chopra / N. Sikki Reddy; Savitree Amitrapai / Dechapol Puavaranukroh	25; 23	10; 21	10; 21
2	(India) (Thailand)	Prannoy H. S. Suppanyu Avihingsanon	21; 18	21; 15
3	(India) (Thailand)	Manu Attri / B. Sumeeth Reddy; Kittinupong Kedren / Nipitphon Phuangphuapet	21; 19	21; 16
4	(India) (Thailand)	Rituparna Das; Pornpawee Chochuwong	21; 11	12; 21	15; 21
5	(India) (Thailand)	Ashwini Ponnappa / N. Sikki Reddy; Jongkolphan Kititharakul / Rawinda Prajongjai	21; 15	17; 21	7; 21

China
3
Report
17 February 2017

Malaysia
0

			1	2	3
1	(China) (Malaysia)	Chen Qingchen / Zhang Nan; Goh Soon Huat / Shevon Jemie Lai	21; 14	21; 9
2	(China) (Malaysia)	Shi Yuqi; Lim Chi Wing	21; 7	21; 14
3	(China) (Malaysia)	Li Junhui / Liu Yuchen; Goh Sze Fei / Nur Izzuddin	19; 21	21; 19	22; 20
4	(China) (Malaysia)	Chen Yufei; Ho Yen Mei				not played
5	(China) (Malaysia)	Chen Qingchen / Jia Yifan; Lim Yin Loo / Yap Cheng Wen				not played

Chinese Taipei
0
Report
17 February 2017

South Korea
3

			1	2	3
1	(Chinese Taipei) (South Korea)	Lee Jhe-huei / Lee Yang; Kim Gi-jung / Yoo Yeon-seong	21; 19	16; 21	18; 21
2	(Chinese Taipei) (South Korea)	Chiang Mei-hui; Sung Ji-hyun	6; 21	14; 21
3	(Chinese Taipei) (South Korea)	Chou Tien-chen; Son Wan-ho	19; 21	7; 21
4	(Chinese Taipei) (South Korea)	Hsu Ya-ching / Wu Ti-jung; Chang Ye-na / Lee So-hee				not played
5	(Chinese Taipei) (South Korea)	Lee Chia-hsin / Tseng Min-hao; Choi Sol-gyu / Kim Ha-na				not played

=== Semifinals ===
China
1
Report
18 February 2017

Japan
3

			1	2	3
1	(China) (Japan)	Chen Qingchen / Zhang Nan; Yuta Watanabe / Arisa Higashino	22; 20	21; 19
2	(China) (Japan)	Shi Yuqi; Kenta Nishimoto	21; 10	19; 21	17; 21
3	(China) (Japan)	Li Junhui / Zheng Siwei; Takeshi Kamura / Keigo Sonoda	16; 21	21; 16	16; 21
4	(China) (Japan)	Chen Yufei; Akane Yamaguchi	15; 21	10; 21
5	(China) (Japan)	Chen Qingchen / Jia Yifan; Misaki Matsutomo / Ayaka Takahashi				not played

Thailand
1
Report
18 February 2017

South Korea
3

			1	2	3
1	(Thailand) (South Korea)	Dechapol Puavaranukroh / Sapsiree Taerattanachai; Choi Sol-gyu / Kim Ha-na	21; 18	18; 21	21; 15
2	(Thailand) (South Korea)	Suppanyu Avihingsanon; Son Wan-ho	21; 18	7; 21	19; 21
3	(Thailand) (South Korea)	Nipitphon Phuangphuapet / Dechapol Puavaranukroh; Kim Gi-jung / Yoo Yeon-seong	21; 23	17; 21
4	(Thailand) (South Korea)	Busanan Ongbamrungphan; Sung Ji-hyun	12; 21	14; 21
5	(Thailand) (South Korea)	Puttita Supajirakul / Sapsiree Taerattanachai; Chang Ye-na / Lee So-hee				not played

=== Final ===
Japan
3
Report
19 February 2017

South Korea
0

			1	2	3
1	(Japan) (South Korea)	Takeshi Kamura / Keigo Sonoda; Kim Gi-jung / Yoo Yeon-seong	21; 15	21; 16
2	(Japan) (South Korea)	Akane Yamaguchi; Sung Ji-hyun	22; 20	23; 21
3	(Japan) (South Korea)	Kenta Nishimoto; Jeon Hyeok-jin	21; 13	21; 16
4	(Japan) (South Korea)	Misaki Matsutomo / Ayaka Takahashi; Chang Ye-na / Lee So-hee				not played
5	(Japan) (South Korea)	Yuta Watanabe / Arisa Higashino; Kim Gi-jung / Kim Ha-na				not played
