= 2013 Asian Junior Badminton Championships – Boys singles =

Tournament details
- Dates: 10 – 14 July 2013
- Edition: 16
- Venue: Likas Indoor Stadium
- Location: Kota Kinabalu, Malaysia

The boys' singles tournament of the 2013 Asian Junior Badminton Championships was held from July 10–14 in Kota Kinabalu, Malaysia. The defending champion of the last edition was Kento Momota from Japan. Thammasin Sitthikom of Thailand who standing in the top seeds was defeated by the No.5 seeded Soo Teck Zhi of Malaysia in the semifinals, while the second seeded Soong Joo Ven of Malaysia fell in the quarterfinals to Jeon Hyuk-jin of South Korea. Soo Teck Zhi emerged as the champion after beat Jeon Hyuk-jin in the finals with the score 21–17, 13–21, 21–15.

== Seeded ==
1. (Thailand) Thammasin Sitthikom (semi-final)
2. (Malaysia) Soong Joo Ven (quarter-final)
3. (Thailand) Pannawit Thongnuam (fourth round)
4. (South Korea) Heo Kwang-hee (fourth round)
5. (Malaysia) Soo Teck Zhi (champion)
6. (India) Harsheel Dani (fourth round)
7. (Chinese Taipei) Wang Tzu-wei (semi-final)
8. (Indonesia) Fikri Ihsandi Hadmadi (fourth round)
9. (South Korea) Jeon Hyuk-jin (final)
10. (Hong Kong) Chang Tak Ching (second round)
11. (Thailand) Kittiphon Chairojkanjana (fourth round)
12. (Malaysia) Cheam June Wei (fourth round)
13. (Hong Kong) Lee Cheuk Yiu (second round)
14. (Indonesia) Ihsan Maulana Mustofa (quarter-final)
15. (India) Aditya Joshi (fourth round)
16. (Japan) Yugo Kobayashi (fourth round)

== Draw ==
=== Finals ===
Quarterfinals
1	(Thailand) Thammasin Sitthikom	21	21
14	(Indonesia) Ihsan Maulana Mustofa	15	12
(China) Zhao Junpeng	15	12
5	(Malaysia) Soo Teck Zhi	21	21
7	(Chinese Taipei) Wang Tzu-wei	21	21
(China) Shi Yuqi	10	6
9	(South Korea) Jeon Hyuk-jin	21	21	21
2	(Malaysia) Soong Joo Ven	23	17	11

Semifinals
1	(Thailand) Thammasin Sitthikom	14	12
5	(Malaysia) Soo Teck Zhi	21	21
7	(Chinese Taipei) Wang Tzu-wei	20	18
9	(South Korea) Jeon Hyuk-jin	22	21

Final
5	(Malaysia) Soo Teck Zhi	21	13	21
9	(South Korea) Jeon Hyuk-jin	17	21	15

=== Top half ===
==== Section 1 ====
First round

Second round
1	(Thailand) T Sitthikom	21	21
(Sri Lanka) I Kahingalage	8	6
(Uzbekistan) H Orziobev	7	3
(Japan) K Matsumoto	21	21
12	(Malaysia) Cheam JW	21	21
(Hong Kong) Lee CW	15	10
(Chinese Taipei) Yang Y-h	21	21
(Bangladesh) T Roy	13	9

Third round
1	(Thailand) T Sitthikom	21	21
(Japan) K Matsumoto	17	7
12	(Malaysia) Cheam JW	13	21	21
(Chinese Taipei) Yang Y-h	21	19	14

Fourth round
1	(Thailand) T Sitthikom	21	15	21
12	(Malaysia) Cheam JW	9	21	12

==== Section 2 ====
First round

Second round
6	(India) H Dani	21	21
(Macau) Iek UL	14	11
(Iran) A Faghfori	12	11
(Vietnam) Pham CC	21	21
14	(Indonesia) I Mustofa	21	21
(South Korea) Lee J-s	10	19
(Nepal) D Dhami	8	14
(China) Zheng SW	21	21

Third round
6	(India) H Dani	18	23	21
(Vietnam) Pham CC	21	21	16
14	(Indonesia) I Mustofa	16	21	24
(China) Zheng SW	21	14	22

Fourth round
6	(India) H Dani	17	13
14	(Indonesia) I Mustofa	21	21

==== Section 3 ====
First round

Second round
4	(South Korea) Heo K-h	21	22
(Singapore) B Ong	18	20
(India) A George	21	21
(Bangladesh) M Munna	9	8
13	(Hong Kong) Lee CY	14	22	6
(China) Zhao JP	21	20	21
(Malaysia) Lim CW	21	16	21
(Japan) Y Igarashi	14	21	15

Third round
4	(South Korea) Heo K-h	21	21
(India) A George	15	13
(China) Zhao JP	21	21
(Malaysia) Lim CW	16	11

Fourth round
4	(South Korea) Heo K-h	17	20
(China) Zhao JP	21	22

==== Section 4 ====
First round

Second round
5	(Malaysia) Soo TZ	23	21
(Vietnam) Pham HN	21	6
(Indonesia) M Pangisthu	16	19
(Chinese Taipei) Yang S-j	21	21
11	(Thailand) K Chairojkanjana	21	21
(Sri Lanka) S Widanalage	14	14
(Macau) J Lo	21	21
(Kazakhstan) D Serebryakov	7	5

Third round
5	(Malaysia) Soo TZ	21	21
(Chinese Taipei) Yang S-j	9	13
11	(Thailand) K Chairojkanjana	21	21
(Macau) J Lo	8	5

Fourth round
5	(Malaysia) Soo TZ	21	21
11	(Thailand) K Chairojkanjana	15	7

=== Bottom half ===
==== Section 5 ====
First round
(Singapore) R Ng	21	21
(Bangladesh) A Jaman	12	16

Second round
(Singapore) R Ng	21	21
(Macau) Lou HM	7	9
(Vietnam) Do TD	17	21	17
15	(India) A Joshi	21	9	21
(Uzbekistan) A Bakhshullaev	21	17	21
(Nepal) B Magar	12	21	15
(Kazakhstan) D Malikov	8	6
7	(Chinese Taipei) Wang T-w	21	21

Third round
(Singapore) R Ng	15	17
15	(India) A Joshi	21	21
(Uzbekistan) A Bakhshullaev	5	7
7	(Chinese Taipei) Wang T-w	21	21

Fourth round
15	(India) A Joshi	16	12
7	(Chinese Taipei) Wang T-w	21	21

==== Section 6 ====
First round

Second round
(Indonesia) A Ginting	17	11
(Japan) Y Onodera	21	21
(China) Shi YQ	21	21
10	(Hong Kong) Chang TC	19	17
(Malaysia) V Phuah	10	21	20
(South Korea) Seo S-j	21	11	22
(Sri Lanka) B Goonathilieke	15	13
3	(Thailand) P Thongnuam	21	21

Third round
(Japan) Y Onodera	13	16
(China) Shi YQ	21	21
(South Korea) Seo S-j	12	19
3	(Thailand) P Thongnuam	21	21

Fourth round
(China) Shi YQ	21	27	21
3	(Thailand) P Thongnuam	15	29	14

==== Section 7 ====
First round

Second round
(Iran) M Shahbazi	15	13
(China) Lin GP	21	21
(Singapore) D Ng	11	11
9	(South Korea) Jeon H-j	21	21
(Malaysia) S Ramachandran	21	16	21
(India) A Naqvi	10	21	12
(Kazakhstan) K Kulmatov	9	15
8	(Indonesia) F Hadmadi	21	21

Third round
(China) Lin GP	12	16
9	(South Korea) Jeon H-j	21	21
(Malaysia) S Ramachandran	14	12
8	(Indonesia) F Hadmadi	21	21

Fourth round
9	(South Korea) Jeon H-j	21	21
8	(Indonesia) F Hadmadi	18	12

==== Section 8 ====
First round

Second round
(Hong Kong) Tang CM	21	21
(Bangladesh) M Hossain	9	7
(Thailand) P Boontan	18	15
16	(Japan) Y Kobayashi	21	21
(Vietnam) Vo BT	21	21
(Macau) Wan CM	3	3
(Sri Lanka) M Samaranayake	4	10
2	(Malaysia) Soong JV	21	21

Third round
(Hong Kong) Tang CM	19	9
16	(Japan) Y Kobayashi	21	21
(Vietnam) Vo BT	7	10
2	(Malaysia) Soong JV	21	21

Fourth round
16	(Japan) Y Kobayashi	15	23	12
2	(Malaysia) Soong JV	21	21	21
