= Badminton at the 2022 Asian Games – Men's team =

Men's team at the 2022 Asian Games
- Venue: Binjiang Gymnasium, Hangzhou, China
- Dates: 28 September – 1 October 2023

Medalists
| gold medal | China; Feng Yanzhe, Li Shifeng, Liang Weikeng, Liu Yuchen, Lu Guangzu, Ou Xuanyi, Shi Yuqi, Wang Chang, Weng Hongyang, Zheng Siwei |
| silver medal | India; Arjun M. R., Dhruv Kapila, Rohan Kapoor, Srikanth Kidambi, Mithun Manjunath, Prannoy H. S., Satwiksairaj Rankireddy, Sai Pratheek K., Lakshya Sen, Chirag Shetty |
| bronze medal | Japan; Takuro Hoki, Yugo Kobayashi, Akira Koga, Kodai Naraoka, Kenta Nishimoto, Taichi Saito, Kanta Tsuneyama, Koki Watanabe, Yuta Watanabe, Kyohei Yamashita |
| bronze medal | South Korea; Cho Geon-yeop, Choi Sol-gyu, Jeon Hyeok-jin, Jin Yong, Kang Min-hyuk, Kim Young-hyuk, Kim Won-ho, Lee Yun-gyu, Na Sung-seung, Seo Seung-jae |

The badminton men's team tournament at the 2022 Asian Games took place from 28 September to 1 October 2023 at Binjiang Gymnasium in Hangzhou, China. The draw for the team event was held on 27 September.

== Schedule ==
All times are China Standard Time (UTC+08:00)

| Date | Time | Event |
|---|---|---|
| Thursday, 28 September 2023 | 17:00 | Round of 16 |
| Friday, 29 September 2023 | 17:00 | Quarterfinals |
| Saturday, 30 September 2023 | 17:00 | Semifinals |
| Sunday, 1 October 2023 | 17:00 | Gold medal match |

== Results ==
Legend

- WO — Won by walkover

Round of 16
South Korea | 3
Malaysia | 1
Mongolia | 1
Nepal | 3
Hong Kong | 3
Thailand | 2
Singapore | 0
3 | Japan | 3
Chinese Taipei | 3
Maldives | 0

Quarter-finals
1 | Indonesia | 1
South Korea | 3
4 | India | 3
Nepal | 0
Hong Kong | 1
3 | Japan | 3
Chinese Taipei | 1
2 | China | 3

Semi-finals
South Korea | 2
4 | India | 3
3 | Japan | 1
2 | China | 3

Gold medal match
4 | India | 2
2 | China | 3

=== Round of 16 ===
South Korea
3
Binjiang Gymnasium, Court 1
September 28, 2023, 17:00 UTC+8

Malaysia
1

| | | | 1 | 2 | 3 |
|---|---|---|---|---|---|---|
| 1 | (South Korea) (Malaysia) | Jeon Hyeok-jin; Lee Zii Jia | 21; 14 | 14; 21 | 21; 18 |
| 2 | (South Korea) (Malaysia) | Kang Min-hyuk / Seo Seung-jae; Aaron Chia / Soh Wooi Yik | 17; 21 | 9; 21 |
| 3 | (South Korea) (Malaysia) | Lee Yun-gyu; Ng Tze Yong | 21; 11 | 21; 16 |
| 4 | (South Korea) (Malaysia) | Kim Won-ho / Na Sung-seung; Ong Yew Sin / Teo Ee Yi | 21; 16 | 21; 18 |
| 5 | (South Korea) (Malaysia) | Cho Geon-yeop; Leong Jun Hao | | | | not played |

Mongolia
1
Binjiang Gymnasium, Court 4
September 28, 2023, 9:00 UTC+8

Nepal
3

| | | | 1 | 2 | 3 |
|---|---|---|---|---|---|---|
| 1 | (Mongolia) (Nepal) | Gerelsukh Jargalsaikhan; Prince Dahal | 8; 21 | 14; 21 |
| 2 | (Mongolia) (Nepal) | Khuvituguldur Byambajav; Sunil Joshi | 11; 21 | 7; 21 |
| 3 | (Mongolia) (Nepal) | Sumiyasuren Enkhbat; Bishnu Katuwal | 23; 21 | 22; 24 | 21; 17 |
| 4 | (Mongolia) (Nepal) | Enkhbat Olonbayar / Zolzaya Munkhbaatar; Prince Dahal / Bishnu Katuwal | 8; 21 | 9; 21 |
| 5 | (Mongolia) (Nepal) | Davaasuren Battur / Huvituguldur Byambajav; Jivan Acharya / Sunil Joshi | | | | not played |

Hong Kong
3
Binjiang Gymnasium, Court 4
September 28, 2023, 17:00 UTC+8

Thailand
2

| | | | 1 | 2 | 3 |
|---|---|---|---|---|---|
| 1 | (Hong Kong) (Thailand) | Lee Cheuk Yiu; Kunlavut Vitidsarn | 21; 19 | 18; 21 | 8; 21 |
| 2 | (Hong Kong) (Thailand) | Lui Chun Wai / Yeung Shing Choi; Supak Jomkoh / Kittinupong Kedren | 19; 21 | 21; 16 | 27; 25 |
| 3 | (Hong Kong) (Thailand) | Ng Ka Long; Kantaphon Wangcharoen | 21; 16 | 16; 21 | 21; 13 |
| 4 | (Hong Kong) (Thailand) | Lee Chun Hei / Tang Chun Man; Dechapol Puavaranukroh / Pakkapon Teeraratsakul | 14; 21 | 16; 21 |
| 5 | (Hong Kong) (Thailand) | Chan Yin Chak; Panitchaphon Teeraratsakul | 14; 21 | 21; 11 | 24; 22 |

Singapore
0
Binjiang Gymnasium, Court 2
September 28, 2023,

00 UTC+8

Japan
3

| | | | 1 | 2 | 3 |
|---|---|---|---|---|---|---|
| 1 | (Singapore) (Japan) | Loh Kean Yew; Kenta Nishimoto | 21; 17 | 14; 21 | 9; 21 |
| 2 | (Singapore) (Japan) | Andy Kwek / Loh Kean Hean; Takuro Hoki / Yugo Kobayashi | 10; 21 | 10; 21 |
| 3 | (Singapore) (Japan) | Jason Teh; Kanta Tsuneyama | 16; 21 | 24; 26 |
| 4 | (Singapore) (Japan) | Johann Prajogo / Nge Joo Jie; Akira Koga / Taichi Saito | | | | not played |
| 5 | (Singapore) (Japan) | Joel Koh; Koki Watanabe | | | | not played |

Chinese Taipei
3
Binjiang Gymnasium, Court 3
September 28, 2023, 17:00 UTC+8

Maldives
0

| | | | 1 | 2 | 3 |
|---|---|---|---|---|---|---|
| 1 | (Chinese Taipei) (Maldives) | Chou Tien-chen; Hussein Zayan Shaheed | 21; 8 | 21; 1 |
| 2 | (Chinese Taipei) (Maldives) | Wang Tzu-wei; Nibal Ahmed | 21; 7 | 21; 10 |
| 3 | (Chinese Taipei) (Maldives) | Chi Yu-jen; Mohamed Ajfan Rasheed | 21; 4 | 21; 5 |
| 4 | (Chinese Taipei) (Maldives) | Lu Ching-yao / Yang Po-han; Thoif Ahmed Mohamed / Hussein Zayan Shaheed | | | | not played |
| 5 | (Chinese Taipei) (Maldives) | Lee Yang / Wang Chi-lin; Ahmed Nibal / Mohamed Ajfan Rasheed | | | | not played |

=== Quarter-finals ===
Indonesia
1
Binjiang Gymnasium, Court 2
September 29, 2023, 17:00 UTC+8

South Korea
3

| | | | 1 | 2 | 3 |
|---|---|---|---|---|---|---|
| 1 | (Indonesia) (South Korea) | Anthony Sinisuka Ginting; Jeon Hyeok-jin | 21; 15 | 21; 17 |
| 2 | (Indonesia) (South Korea) | Fajar Alfian / Muhammad Rian Ardianto; Kang Min-hyuk / Seo Seung-jae | 21; 11 | 22; 24 | 17; 21 |
| 3 | (Indonesia) (South Korea) | Jonatan Christie; Lee Yun-gyu | 15; 21 | 16; 21 |
| 4 | (Indonesia) (South Korea) | Leo Rolly Carnando / Daniel Marthin; Kim Won-ho / Na Sung-seung | 18; 21 | 17; 21 |
| 5 | (Indonesia) (South Korea) | Chico Aura Dwi Wardoyo; Cho Geon-yeop | | | | not played |

India
3
Binjiang Gymnasium, Court 3
September 29, 2023, 17:00 UTC+8

Nepal
0

| | | | 1 | 2 | 3 |
|---|---|---|---|---|---|---|
| 1 | (India) (Nepal) | Lakshya Sen; Prince Dahal | 21; 5 | 21; 8 |
| 2 | (India) (Nepal) | Srikanth Kidambi; Sunil Joshi | 21; 4 | 21; 13 |
| 3 | (India) (Nepal) | Mithun Manjunath; Bishnu Katwal | 21; 2 | 21; 7 |
| 4 | (India) (Nepal) | Arjun M. R. / Dhruv Kapila; Sunil Joshi / Bishnu Katwal | | | | not played |
| 5 | (India) (Nepal) | Satwiksairaj Rankireddy / Chirag Shetty; Prince Dahal / Bishnu Katwal | | | | not played |

Hong Kong
1
Binjiang Gymnasium, Court 4
September 29, 2023, 17:00 UTC+8

Japan
3

| | | | 1 | 2 | 3 |
|---|---|---|---|---|---|---|
| 1 | (Hong Kong) (Japan) | Lee Cheuk Yiu; Kodai Naraoka | 21; 15 | 20; 22 | 21; 11 |
| 2 | (Hong Kong) (Japan) | Chow Hin Long / Liu Chun Wai; Takuro Hoki / Yugo Kobayashi | 10; 21 | 13; 21 |
| 3 | (Hong Kong) (Japan) | Ng Ka Long; Kenta Nishimoto | 17; 21 | 21; 10 | 16; 21 |
| 4 | (Hong Kong) (Japan) | Lee Chun Hei / Yeung Shing Choi; Akira Koga / Taichi Saito | 17; 21 | 15; 21 |
| 5 | (Hong Kong) (Japan) | Jason Gunawan; Kanta Tsuneyama | | | | not played |

Chinese Taipei
1
Binjiang Gymnasium, Court 1
September 29, 2023, 17:00 UTC+8

China
3

| | | | 1 | 2 | 3 |
|---|---|---|---|---|---|---|
| 1 | (Chinese Taipei) (China) | Chou Tien-chen; Shi Yuqi | 24; 22 | 21; 11 |
| 2 | (Chinese Taipei) (China) | Lee Yang / Wang Chi-lin; Liang Weikeng / Wang Chang | 17; 21 | 19; 21 |
| 3 | (Chinese Taipei) (China) | Wang Tzu-wei; Li Shifeng | 14; 21 | 12; 21 |
| 4 | (Chinese Taipei) (China) | Lu Ching-yao / Ye Hong-wei; Liu Yuchen / Ou Xuanyi | 18; 21 | 19; 21 |
| 5 | (Chinese Taipei) (China) | Chi Yu-jen; Lu Guangzu | | | | not played |

=== Semi-finals ===
South Korea
2
Binjiang Gymnasium, Court 2
September 30, 2023, 17:00 UTC+8

India
3

| | | | 1 | 2 | 3 |
|---|---|---|---|---|---|
| 1 | (South Korea) (India) | Jeon Hyeok-jin; Prannoy H. S. | 21; 18 | 16; 21 | 19; 21 |
| 2 | (South Korea) (India) | Kang Min-hyuk / Seo Seung-jae; Satwiksairaj Rankireddy / Chirag Shetty | 21; 13 | 26; 24 |
| 3 | (South Korea) (India) | Lee Yun-gyu; Lakshya Sen | 7; 21 | 9; 21 |
| 4 | (South Korea) (India) | Kim Won-ho / Na Sung-seung; Arjun M. R. / Dhruv Kapila | 21; 16 | 21; 11 |
| 5 | (South Korea) (India) | Cho Geon-yeop; Srikanth Kidambi | 21; 12 | 16; 21 | 14; 21 |

Japan
1
Binjiang Gymnasium, Court 1
September 30, 2023, 17:00 UTC+8

China
3

| | | | 1 | 2 | 3 |
|---|---|---|---|---|---|---|
| 1 | (Japan) (China) | Kenta Nishimoto; Shi Yuqi | 10; 21 | 21; 16 | 21; 14 |
| 2 | (Japan) (China) | Takuro Hoki / Yugo Kobayashi; Liang Weikeng / Wang Chang | 21; 23 | 23; 25 |
| 3 | (Japan) (China) | Kanta Tsuneyama; Li Shifeng | 16; 21 | 10; 21 |
| 4 | (Japan) (China) | Akira Koga / Taichi Saito; Liu Yuchen / Ou Xuanyi | 21; 15 | 14; 21 | 17; 21 |
| 5 | (Japan) (China) | Koki Watanabe; Weng Hongyang | | | | not played |

=== Gold medal match ===
India
2
Binjiang Gymnasium, Court 1
October 1, 2023, 17:00 UTC+8

China
3

| | | | 1 | 2 | 3 |
|---|---|---|---|---|---|
| 1 | (India) (China) | Lakshya Sen; Shi Yuqi | 22; 20 | 14; 21 | 21; 18 |
| 2 | (India) (China) | Satwiksairaj Rankireddy / Chirag Shetty; Liang Weikeng / Wang Chang | 21; 15 | 21; 18 |
| 3 | (India) (China) | Kidambi Srikanth; Li Shifeng | 22; 24 | 9; 21 |
| 4 | (India) (China) | Dhruv Kapila / Sai Pratheek K. Liu Yuchen / Ou Xuanyi | 6; 21 | 15; 21 |
| 5 | (India) (China) | Mithun Manjunath; Weng Hongyang | 12; 21 | 4; 21 |
