= Sitthikom Thammasin =

Thai badminton player (born 1995)

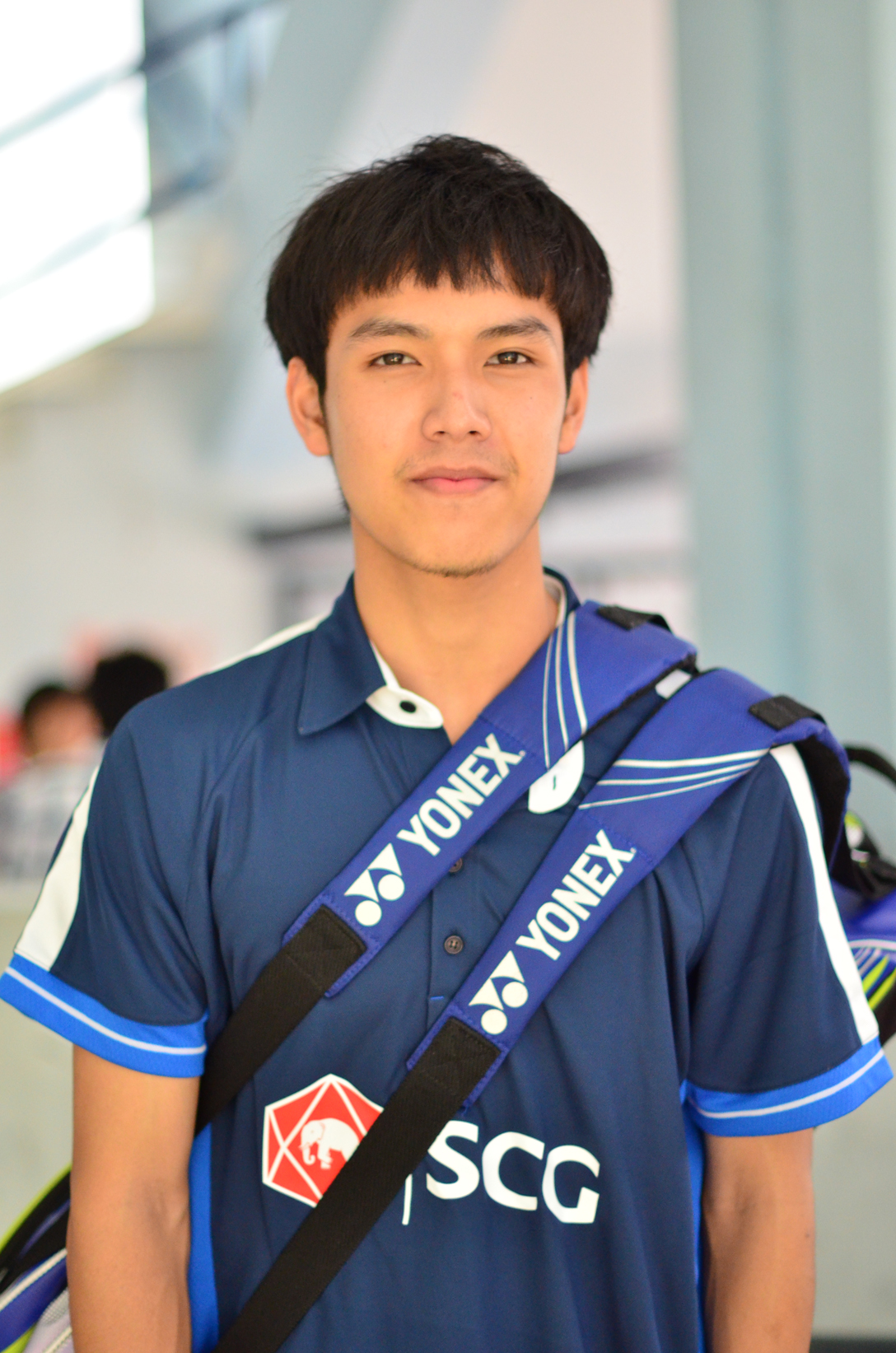

Personal information
- Born: 7 April 1995 (age 31) Bangkok, Thailand
- Height: 1.85 m (6 ft 1 in)
- Weight: 75 kg (165 lb)
- Spouse: Rawinda Prajongjai (m. 2025)

Sport
- Country: Thailand
- Sport: Badminton

Men's singles
- Career record: 162 wins, 111 losses
- Highest ranking: 21 (11 June 2019)
- Current ranking: 40 (1 August 2023)
- BWF profile
Medal record
Men's badminton
Representing Thailand
Sudirman Cup
Bronze medal – third place	2019 Nanning	Mixed team
Asia Mixed Team Championships
Bronze medal – third place	2023 Dubai	Mixed team
SEA Games
Gold medal – first place	2021 Vietnam	Men's team
Bronze medal – third place	2019 Philippines	Men's singles
Bronze medal – third place	2019 Philippines	Men's team
Bronze medal – third place	2023 Cambodia	Men's team
Asian Junior Championships
Bronze medal – third place	2013 Kota Kinabalu	Boys' singles

Sitthikom Thammasin (Thai: สิทธิคมน์ ธรรมศิลป์; born 7 April 1995) is a Thai badminton player. He won the men's singles title at the 2012 Singapore International Series when he was 17. Thammasin was part of the Thailand national team that clinched the bronze medal at the 2019 Sudirman Cup. His best achievement in the individual event was becoming the champion at the BWF World Tour Super 300 2019 Macau Open.

== Achievements ==
=== SEA Games ===
Men's singles
Year	Venue	Opponent	Score	Result
2019	Muntinlupa Sports Complex, Metro Manila, Philippines	(Malaysia) Lee Zii Jia	12–21, 9–21	Bronze

=== Asian Junior Championships ===
Boys' singles
Year	Venue	Opponent	Score	Result
2013	Likas Indoor Stadium; Kota Kinabalu, Malaysia	(Malaysia) Soo Teck Zhi	14–21, 12–21	Bronze

=== BWF World Tour (2 titles) ===
The BWF World Tour, which was announced on 19 March 2017 and implemented in 2018, is a series of elite badminton tournaments sanctioned by the Badminton World Federation (BWF). The BWF World Tours are divided into levels of World Tour Finals, Super 1000, Super 750, Super 500, Super 300 (part of the HSBC World Tour), and the BWF Tour Super 100.

Men's singles
Year	Tournament	Level	Opponent	Score	Result
2018	Akita Masters	Super 100	(Indonesia) Ihsan Maulana Mustofa	21–10, 21–13	(gold) Winner
2019	Macau Open	Super 300	(China) Shi Yuqi	12–21, 21–14, 21–7	(gold) Winner

=== BWF International Challenge/Series (3 titles, 1 runner-up) ===
Men's singles
Year	Tournament	Opponent	Score	Result
2012	Singapore International	(Singapore) Ashton Chen	22–20, 8–21, 21–8	(gold) Winner
2013	Smiling Fish International	(Thailand) Parinyawat Thongnuam	21–11, 21–16	(gold) Winner
2017	Indonesia International	(Indonesia) Shesar Hiren Rhustavito	8–21, 11–21	(silver) Runner-up
2017	Tata Open India International	(India) Lakshya Sen	15–21, 21–14, 21–19	(gold) Winner

BWF International Challenge tournament
BWF International Series tournament
BWF Future Series tournament
