= Wang Tzu-wei =

Taiwanese badminton player (born 1995)

Wang Tzu-wei 王子維
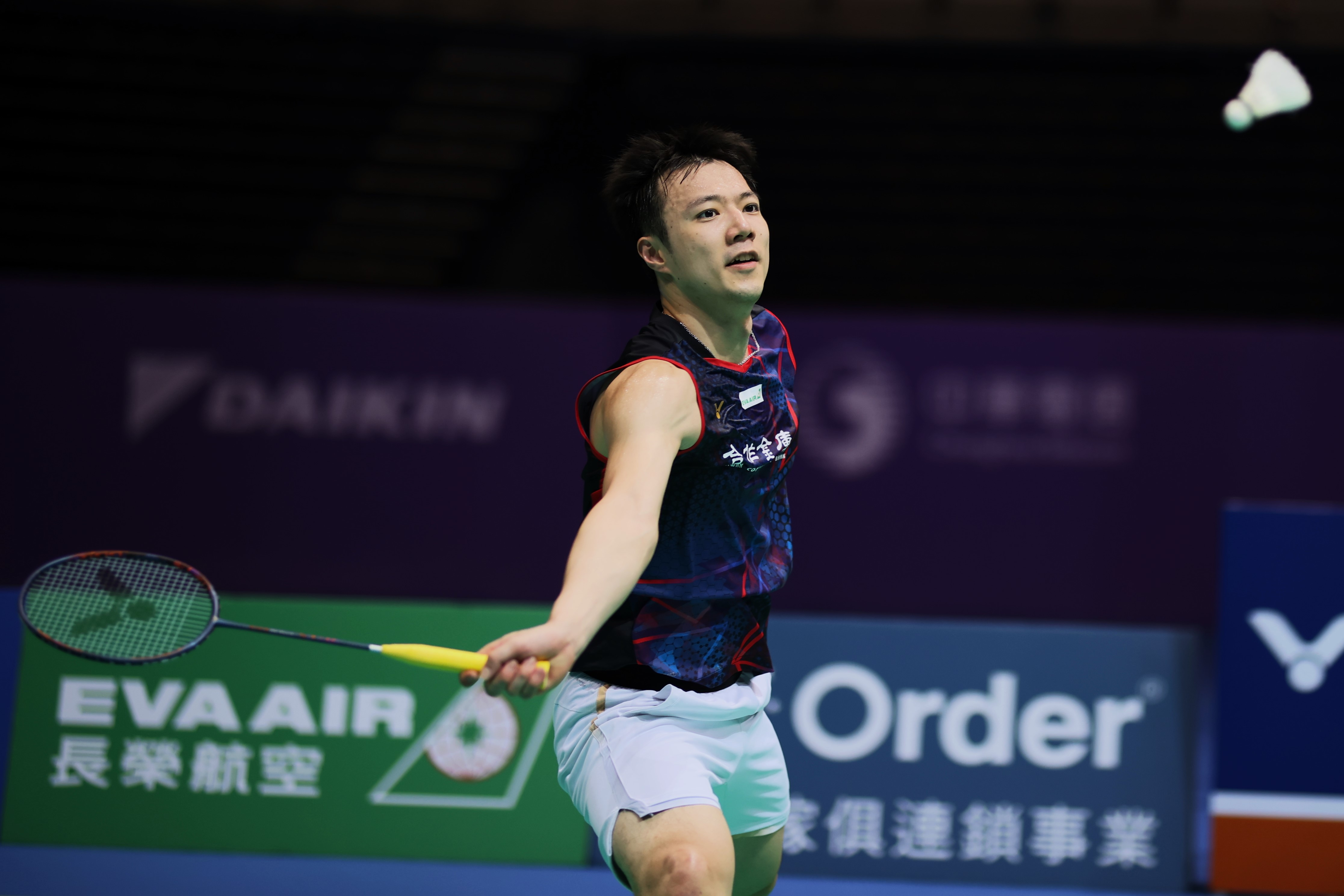
- Wang at the 2024 Kaohsiung Masters

Personal information
- Born: 27 February 1995 (age 31) Taipei, Taiwan
- Height: 1.78 m (5 ft 10 in)

Sport
- Country: Republic of China (Taiwan)
- Sport: Badminton
- Handedness: Right
- Coached by: Luan Jin

Men's singles
- Highest ranking: 9 (2 February 2021)
- Current ranking: 36 (10 November 2026)
- BWF profile
Medal record
Men's badminton
Representing Chinese Taipei
Thomas Cup
Bronze medal – third place	2024 Chengdu	Men's team
Asian Games
Bronze medal – third place	2018 Jakarta–Palembang	Men's team
East Asian Games
Bronze medal – third place	2013 Tianjin	Men's team
Summer Universiade
Gold medal – first place	2017 Taipei	Men's singles
Gold medal – first place	2017 Taipei	Mixed team
World Junior Championships
Silver medal – second place	2013 Bangkok	Boys' singles
Bronze medal – third place	2011 Taipei	Mixed team
Asian Junior Championships
Bronze medal – third place	2013 Kota Kinabalu	Boys' singles

Wang Tzu-wei (Chinese: 王子維; born 27 February 1995) is a Taiwanese badminton player. He won his first international title at the 2014 New Zealand Open tournament. Wang competed at the 2017 Summer Universiade, where he won the gold medals in the men's singles and team events. He also competed at the 2018 Asian Games and 2020 Summer Olympics.

== Achievements ==
=== Summer Universiade ===
Men's singles
Year	Venue	Opponent	Score	Result
2017	Taipei Gymnasium; Taipei, Taiwan	(Japan) Kenta Nishimoto	21–16, 21–15	Gold

=== World University Championships ===
Men's singles
Year	Venue	Opponent	Score	Result
2016	Sports Palace "Borisoglebskiy"; Ramenskoe, Russia	(Malaysia) Zulfadli Zulkiffli	21–6, 21–13	(gold) Winner

=== BWF World Junior Championships ===
Boys' singles
Year	Venue	Opponent	Score	Result
2013	Hua Mark Indoor Stadium; Bangkok, Thailand	(South Korea) Heo Kwang-hee	11–21, 12–21	Silver

=== Asian Junior Championships ===
Boys' singles
Year	Venue	Opponent	Score	Result
2013	Likas Indoor Stadium; Kota Kinabalu, Malaysia	(South Korea) Jeon Hyeok-jin	20–22, 18–21	Bronze

=== BWF World Tour (1 title) ===
The BWF World Tour, which was announced on 19 March 2017 and implemented in 2018, is a series of elite badminton tournaments sanctioned by the Badminton World Federation (BWF). The BWF World Tour is divided into levels of World Tour Finals, Super 1000, Super 750, Super 500, Super 300 (part of the HSBC World Tour), and the BWF Tour Super 100.

Men's singles
Year	Tournament	Level	Opponent	Score	Result
2019	Syed Modi International	Super 300	(India) Sourabh Verma	21–15, 21–17	(gold) Winner

=== BWF Grand Prix (2 titles, 5 runners-up) ===
The BWF Grand Prix had two levels, the Grand Prix and Grand Prix Gold. It was a series of badminton tournaments sanctioned by the Badminton World Federation (BWF) and played between 2007 and 2017.

Men's singles
Year	Tournament	Opponent	Score	Result
2014	New Zealand Open	(Chinese Taipei) Hsu Jen-hao	21–9, 21–13	(gold) Winner
2014	Scottish Open	(Finland) Ville Lang	21–17, 20–22, 16–21	(silver) Runner-up
2015	Chinese Taipei Masters	(Indonesia) Sony Dwi Kuncoro	13–21, 15–21	(silver) Runner-up
2016	Dutch Open	(India) Ajay Jayaram	21–10, 17–21, 21–18	(gold) Winner
2017	German Open	(Chinese Taipei) Chou Tien-chen	16–21, 14–21	(silver) Runner-up
2017	Chinese Taipei Open	(Chinese Taipei) Chou Tien-chen	21–18, 19–21, 15–21	(silver) Runner-up
2017	New Zealand Open	(Hong Kong) Lee Cheuk Yiu	21–15, 15–21, 20–22	(silver) Runner-up

BWF Grand Prix Gold tournament
BWF Grand Prix tournament

=== BWF International Challenge/Series (3 runners-up) ===
Men's singles
Year	Tournament	Opponent	Score	Result
2013	Polish International	(Chinese Taipei) Lin Yu-hsien	19–21, 16–21	(silver) Runner-up
2014	Irish Open	(Hong Kong) Ng Ka Long	18–21, 13–21	(silver) Runner-up
2016	Vietnam International	(Vietnam) Nguyễn Tiến Minh	20–22, 16–21	(silver) Runner-up

BWF International Challenge tournament
BWF International Series tournament

=== Invitation Tournament ===
Mixed doubles
Year	Tournament	Partner	Opponent	Score	Result
2017	Jeunesse Cup International All Star	(Chinese Taipei) Tai Tzu-ying	(Denmark) Mads Conrad-Petersen (Denmark) Line Kjaersfeldt	18–21, 20–22	(silver) Runner-up
