= Lim Chi Wing =

Malaysian badminton player

Lim Chi Wing 林志咏
Personal information
- Born: 11 April 1995 (age 31) Kuala Lumpur, Malaysia

Sport
- Country: Malaysia
- Sport: Badminton
- Handedness: Right
- Coached by: Tey Seu Bock (until 2018)

Men's singles
- Highest ranking: 74 (30 November 2017)
- BWF profile
Medal record
Men's badminton
Representing Malaysia
SEA Games
Silver medal – second place	2017 Kuala Lumpur	Men's team

Lim Chi Wing (born 11 April 1995) is a Malaysian badminton player who specifies in playing men's singles. He won a silver medal in the men's team event at the 2017 Southeast Asian Games.

== Career ==
He started playing badminton when he was 7 before joining the Bukit Jalil Sports School. In 2014, he was called up to the national team. He won his first title at the 2014 Bangladesh International, defeating Subhankar Dey of India with a score of 21–12, 21–17. Later that same year, he won his second career title at the Vietnam International.

Two years later, he would go onto achieve a runner-up position at the India International. He failed to defend his Vietnam International title as he lost to Vietnamese veteran Nguyễn Tiến Minh in 2 games. In August 2019, he left the national team to pursue his career as an independent player. In December 2022, Lim announced his retirement from international badminton to start his new career as a coach after his semifinal loss at the Malaysia International Challenge.

== Achievements ==
=== BWF International Challenge/Series (2 titles, 2 runners-up) ===
Men's singles
Year	Tournament	Opponent	Score	Result
2014	Vietnam International Series	(Chinese Taipei) Lu Chia-hung	21–19, 11–21, 21–17	(gold) Winner
2014	Bangladesh International	(India) Subhankar Dey	21–12, 21–17	(gold) Winner
2016	Vietnam International Series	(Vietnam) Nguyễn Tiến Minh	14–21, 21–23	(silver) Runner-up
2016	Tata Open India International	(Indonesia) Enzi Shafira	11–7, 9–11, 7–11, 6–11	(silver) Runner-up

BWF International Challenge tournament
BWF International Series tournament
BWF Future Series tournament

== Performance timeline ==
Key

W	F	SF	QF	#R	RR	Q#	A	G	S	B	NH	N/A	DNQ

(W) won; (F) finalist; (SF) semi-finalist; (QF) quarter-finalist; (#R) rounds 4, 3, 2, 1; (RR) round-robin stage; (Q#) qualification round; (A) absent; (G) gold, (S) silver or (B) bronze medal; (NH) not held; (N/A) not applicable; (DNQ) did not qualify.
To avoid confusion and double counting, these charts are updated at the conclusion of a tournament or when the player's participation has ended.

=== National team ===
- Senior level

Team events	2017
SEA Games	S

=== Individual competitions ===
- Junior level

Events	2013
Asian Junior Championships	2R
World Junior Championships	4R

- Senior level

Tournament	BWF Superseries / Grand Prix			BWF World Tour					Best
Tournament	2015	2016	2017	2018	2019	2020	2021	2022	Best
Syed Modi International	A					NH		A	-
Spain Masters	NH			A				NH	-
Swiss Open	A					NH	A		-
Orléans Masters	N/A			A		NH	A		-
Korea Masters	A					NH		A	-
Thailand Open	A						NH	A	-
Indonesia Masters	A		NH	A					-
Indonesia Open	A					NH	A		-
Malaysia Masters	1R	1R	1R	Q1			NH	A	1R
Chinese Taipei Open	A		1R	A		NH		A	1R ('17)
Akita Masters	NH			A	A	NH		A	-
Indonesia Masters Super 100	NH			2R	A	NH		A	2R ('18)
Macau Open	A		3R	A	NH		A	A	3R ('17)
Australian Open	A					NH		A	-
Thailand Masters	NH	2R	A				NH		2R ('16)
Lingshui China Masters	N/A			A	NH			-	
Russian Open	A		3R	A		NH			3R ('17)
Hyderabad Open	NH			QF	A	NH			QF ('18)
Vietnam Open	A		1R	1R	A	NH			1R ('17, '18)
Year-end ranking	151	147	84	179	237	266	278	-	74
Tournament	2015	2016	2017	2018	2019	2020	2021	2022	Best
