= Jeon Hyeok-jin =

South Korean badminton player (born 1995)

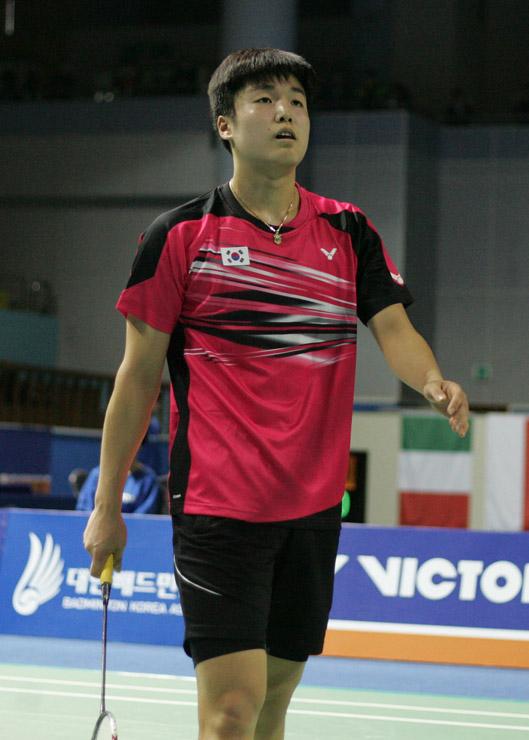
- Jeon at the 2015 Korea Grand Prix Gold

Personal information
- Born: 13 June 1995 (age 31) Ulsan, South Korea
- Height: 1.78 m (5 ft 10 in)
- Weight: 67 kg (148 lb)

Sport
- Country: South Korea
- Sport: Badminton
- Handedness: Right

Men's singles
- Career record: 238 wins, 106 losses
- Highest ranking: 18 (8 February 2018)
- Current ranking: 57 (6 October 2026)
- BWF profile
Medal record
Men's badminton
Representing South Korea
Sudirman Cup
Gold medal – first place	2017 Gold Coast	Mixed team
Silver medal – second place	2023 Suzhou	Mixed team
Silver medal – second place	2025 Xiamen	Mixed team
Bronze medal – third place	2021 Vantaa	Mixed team
Thomas Cup
Bronze medal – third place	2016 Kunshan	Men's team
Asian Games
Gold medal – first place	2014 Incheon	Men's team
Bronze medal – third place	2022 Hangzhou	Men's team
Asia Mixed Team Championships
Silver medal – second place	2017 Ho Chi Minh	Mixed team
Asia Team Championships
Bronze medal – third place	2016 Hyderabad	Men's team
Bronze medal – third place	2018 Alor Setar	Men's team
Bronze medal – third place	2022 Selangor	Men's team
Bronze medal – third place	2024 Selangor	Men's team
East Asian Games
Bronze medal – third place	2013 Tianjin	Men's singles
Summer Universiade
Gold medal – first place	2015 Gwangju	Men's singles
Gold medal – first place	2015 Gwangju	Mixed team
World Junior Championships
Gold medal – first place	2013 Bangkok	Mixed team
Bronze medal – third place	2012 Chiba	Mixed team
Asian Junior Championships
Silver medal – second place	2013 Kota Kinabalu	Boys' singles
Silver medal – second place	2013 Kota Kinabalu	Mixed team
Bronze medal – third place	2012 Gimcheon	Mixed team

- Jeon Hyeok-jin
- Hangul: 전혁진
- Hanja: 全奕陳
- RR: Jeon Hyeokjin
- MR: Chŏn Hyŏkchin

Jeon Hyeok-jin (born 13 June 1995) is a Korean badminton player. Specializing in singles, he was runner-up at the 2013 Asian Junior Badminton Championships. Jeon was part of the Korean team that won men's team gold at the 2014 Asian Games and the following year, he beat both Chou Tien-chen and compatriot Son Wan-ho to win gold at the 2015 Summer Universiade. In 2017, he helped the Korean national team to win the world team championships at the Sudirman Cup. Jeon competed for South Korea at the 2024 Summer Olympics in the men's singles event.

== Achievements ==
=== East Asian Games ===
Men's singles
Year	Venue	Opponent	Score	Result
2013	Binhai New Area Dagang Gymnasium; Tianjin, China	(China) Du Pengyu	15–21, 17–21	Bronze

=== Summer Universiade ===
Men's singles
Year	Venue	Opponent	Score	Result
2015	Hwasun Hanium Culture Sports Center; Hwasun, South Korea	(South Korea) Son Wan-ho	22–20, 13–21, 21–17	Gold

=== Asian Junior Championships ===
Boys' singles
Year	Venue	Opponent	Score	Result
2013	Likas Indoor Stadium; Kota Kinabalu, Malaysia	(Malaysia) Soo Teck Zhi	17–21, 21–13, 15–21	Silver

=== BWF World Tour (1 title, 1 runner-up) ===
The BWF World Tour, which was announced on 19 March 2017 and implemented in 2018, is a series of elite badminton tournaments sanctioned by the Badminton World Federation (BWF). The BWF World Tour is divided into levels of World Tour Finals, Super 1000, Super 750, Super 500, Super 300, and the BWF Tour Super 100.

Men's singles
Year	Tournament	Level	Opponent	Score	Result
2022	Korea Masters	Super 300	(Japan) Kodai Naraoka	21–17, 21–16	(gold) Winner
2025 (I)	Indonesia Masters	Super 100	(Indonesia) Chico Aura Dwi Wardoyo	21–13, 9–21, 17–21	(silver) Runner-up

=== BWF Superseries (1 runner-up) ===
The BWF Superseries, which was launched on 14 December 2006 and implemented in 2007, was a series of elite badminton tournaments, sanctioned by the Badminton World Federation (BWF). BWF Superseries levels were Superseries and Superseries Premier. A season of Superseries consisted of twelve tournaments around the world that had been introduced since 2011. Successful players were invited to the Superseries Finals, which were held at the end of each year.

Men's singles
Year	Tournament	Opponent	Score	Result
2016	Australian Open	(Denmark) Hans-Kristian Vittinghus	16–21, 21–19, 11–21	(silver) Runner-up

BWF Super Series tournament

=== BWF Grand Prix (2 titles, 1 runner-up) ===
The BWF Grand Prix had two levels, the Grand Prix and Grand Prix Gold. It was a series of badminton tournaments sanctioned by the Badminton World Federation (BWF) and played between 2007 and 2017.

Men's singles
Year	Tournament	Opponent	Score	Result
2015	Malaysia Masters	(South Korea) Lee Hyun-il	21–19, 13–21, 15–21	(silver) Runner-up
2015	Macau Open	(China) Tian Houwei	21–11, 13–21, 23–21	(gold) Winner
2017	Korea Masters	(South Korea) Kim Min-ki	21–17, 19–21, 21–12	(gold) Winner

BWF Grand Prix Gold tournament

=== BWF International Challenge/Series (3 titles, 3 runners-up) ===
Men's singles
Year	Tournament	Opponent	Score	Result
2015	Osaka International	(Japan) Kazumasa Sakai	15–21, 21–17, 21–14	(gold) Winner
2015	Indonesia International	(Indonesia) Sony Dwi Kuncoro	20–22, 15–21	(silver) Runner-up
2023	Northern Marianas Open	(Chinese Taipei) Liao Jhuo-fu	15–21, 14–21	(silver) Runner-up
2023	Saipan International	(Japan) Takuma Obayashi	19–21, 16–21	(silver) Runner-up
2024	Azerbaijan International	(India) Sameer Verma	13–21, 6–3 retired	(gold) Winner
2024	Thailand International	(South Korea) Son Wan-ho	21–8, 6–0 retired	(gold) Winner

BWF International Challenge tournament
BWF International Series tournament
