= Harsheel Dani =

Indian badminton player (born 1996)

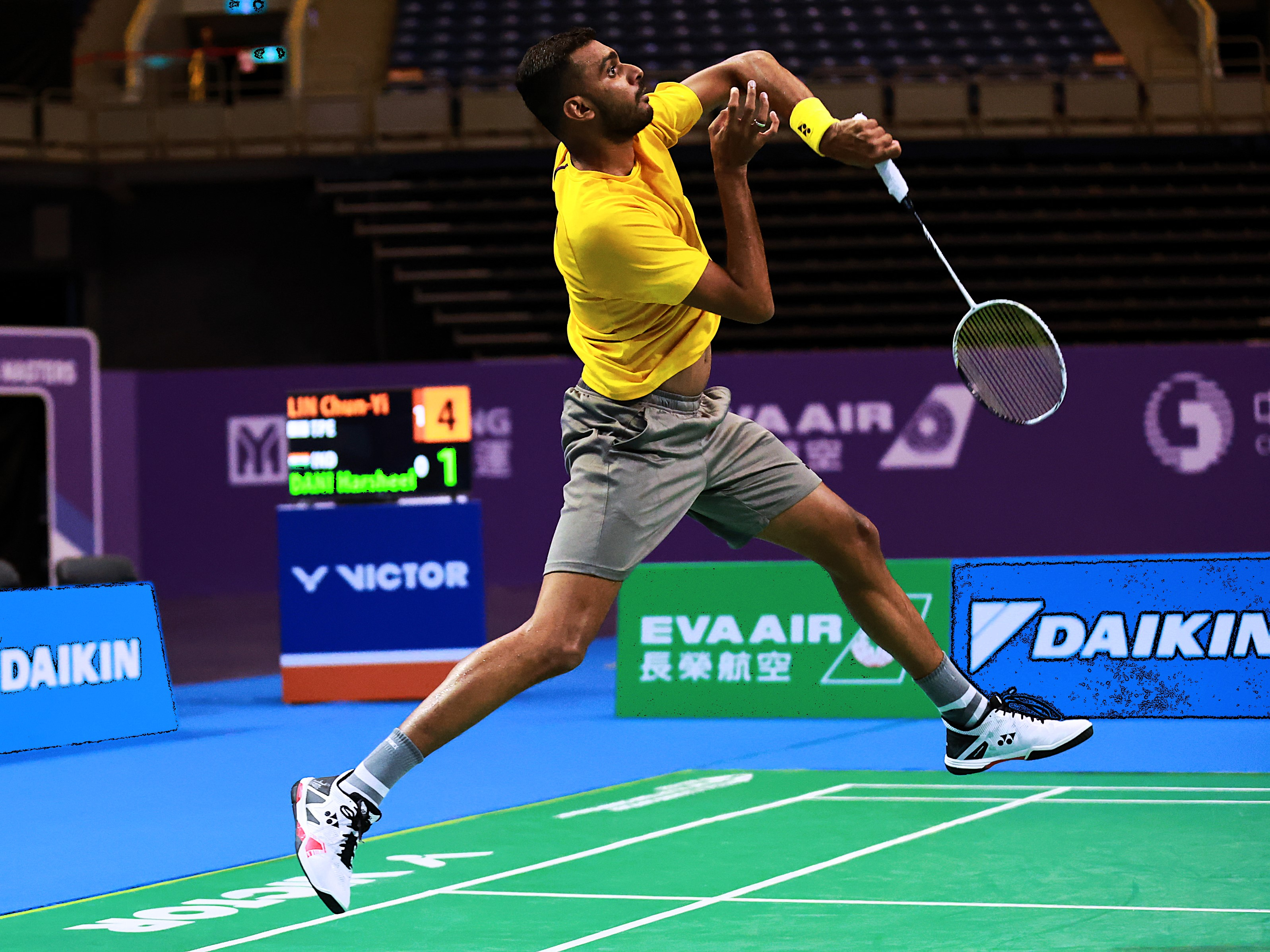
- Dani at the 2023 Kaohsiung Masters

Personal information
- Born: Harsheel Dani; 12 August 1996 (age 30)
- Height: 6 ft 1 in (185 cm)

Sport
- Country: India
- Sport: Badminton
- Handedness: Left
- Coached by: Uday Pawar

Men's singles
- Highest ranking: 68 (10 February 2017)
- BWF profile

Harsheel Dani (born 12 August 1996) is an Indian badminton player. He represented India in the Asian and BWF World Junior Championships. He also became the U-19 singles champion in the junior nationals. Currently training at the Uday Pawar Academy in Mumbai under Indian Coach Uday Pawar, he aims to compete at various international tournaments in order to transition smoothly to the senior circuit .

== Background ==
He attended Thakur College in Kandivali for his undergraduate education.

== Career ==
In 2012 he won the second Karvy All India junior-ranking badminton tournament.

He was the runner-up of the 2015 Turkey International.

At the 2016 Syed Modi International Grand Prix Gold, he reached the quarterfinal.

He was the semi-finalist at the Austrian Open in February 2016.

Harsheel is part of the national training camp at the Pullela Gopichand Academy in Hyderabad, and has left with the team to compete at the Canada Open.

In the 2016 Premier Badminton League, he represented Mumbai Masters.

== Achievements ==
=== BWF International Challenge/Series (3 titles, 2 runners-up) ===
Men's singles
Year	Tournament	Opponent	Score	Result
2015	Turkey International	(Germany) Marc Zwiebler	8–21, 21–15, 7–21	(silver) Runner-up
2018	Ghana International	(India) Siddharath Thakur	14–21, 21–16, 23–21	(gold) Winner
2018	Polish International	(Germany) Kai Schäfer	14–21, 22–20, 9–21	(silver) Runner-up
2019	Dutch International	(Denmark) Mads Christophersen	15–21, 21–12, 21–13	(gold) Winner
2025	Kampala International	(Myanmar) Hein Htut	16–14, 6–15, 16–14	(gold) Winner

BWF International Challenge tournament
BWF International Series tournament
BWF Future Series tournament
