= Badminton Asia Mixed Team Championships =

Badminton Championships

- Current season, competition or edition: 2025 Badminton Asia Mixed Team Championships
- Sport: Badminton
- Founded: 2017
- No. of teams: 12
- Countries: Badminton World Federation members
- Continent: Asia
- Most recent champion: Indonesia
- Most titles: China (2 titles)

The Badminton Asia Mixed Team Championships is a biennial tournament organized by Badminton Asia to crown the best national badminton mixed team in Asia.

It started as a standalone event for mixed teams since 2017, a year after the Asian Confederation organised Badminton Asia Men's and Women's Team Championships.

== Editions and medalists ==
Year	Host	Gold	Silver	Bronze		Ref
2017	Ho Chi Minh City, Vietnam	Japan	South Korea	China	Thailand	
2019	Hong Kong, China	China	Japan	Indonesia	Hong Kong	
2021	Not held due to COVID-19 pandemic in Asia					
2023	Dubai, United Arab Emirates	China	South Korea	India	Thailand	
2025	Qingdao, China	Indonesia	China	Japan	Thailand	
2027	Qingdao, China					

=== Locations ===
Host cities of Badminton Asia Mixed Team Championship

== Medal table ==
Rank	NOC	Gold	Silver	Bronze	Total
1	China	2	1	1	4
2	Japan	1	1	1	3
3	Indonesia	1	0	1	2
4	South Korea	0	2	0	2
5	Thailand	0	0	3	3
6	Hong Kong	0	0	1	1
6	India	0	0	1	1
Totals (7 entries)		4	4	8	16
