= Soo Teck Zhi =

Malaysian badminton player (born 1995)

Soo Teck Zhi 苏德智
Personal information
- Born: 4 August 1995 (age 31) Kelana Jaya, Selangor, Malaysia

Sport
- Country: Malaysia
- Sport: Badminton
- Handedness: Right

Men's singles
- Highest ranking: 50 (9 June 2016)
- Current ranking: 856 (4 October 2022)
- BWF profile
Medal record
Men's badminton
Representing Malaysia
Asian Junior Championships
Gold medal – first place	2013 Kota Kinabalu	Boys' singles

Soo Teck Zhi
- Traditional Chinese: 蘇德智
- Simplified Chinese: 苏德智
Transcriptions
Standard Mandarin
- Hanyu Pinyin: Sū Dézhì

Soo Teck Zhi (born 4 August 1995) is a Malaysian badminton player. He participated at the Vietnam Open 2012, 2012 India Open Grand Prix Gold, 2012 Thailand Open Grand Prix Gold and the 2013 Thailand Open Grand Prix Gold. In 2013 he won the gold medal at the Asian Junior Championships in the boys' singles event.

== Career ==
In his senior career, Soo reached the semifinals of the Copenhagen Masters in 2014 and was the runner-up of the Singapore International in 2015.

He later entered his first BWF Grand Prix semifinal at the 2016 New Zealand Open Grand Prix Gold. In 2018, he won the Bangladesh International and achieved two runner-up positions at the Sydney International and the Nepal International. In 2019, Soo lost the final of the Portugal International to Felix Burestedt of Sweden.

== Achievements ==
=== Asian Junior Championships ===
Boys' singles
Year	Venue	Opponent	Score	Result
2013	Likas Indoor Stadium; Kota Kinabalu, Malaysia	(South Korea) Jeon Hyeok-jin	21–17, 13–21, 21–15	Gold

=== BWF International Challenge/Series (1 title, 4 runner-up) ===
Men's singles
Year	Tournament	Opponent	Score	Result
2019	Portugal International	(Sweden) Felix Burestedt	23–21, 8–21, 17–21	(silver) Runner-up
2018	Bangladesh International	(Vietnam) Phạm Cao Cường	21–17, 21–17	(gold) Winner
2018	Nepal International	(Thailand) Kunlavut Vitidsarn	22–20, 20–22, 9–21	(silver) Runner-up
2018	Sydney International	(Japan) Riichi Takeshita	18–21, 11–21	(silver) Runner-up
2015	Singapore International	(Malaysia) Iskandar Zulkarnain Zainuddin	11–21, 15–21	(silver) Runner-up

BWF International Challenge tournament
BWF International Series tournament

=== BWF Junior International (1 runner-up) ===
Boys' singles
Year	Tournament	Opponent	Score	Result
2013	Maybank Malaysia U19	(South Korea) Choi Sol-gyu	21–13, 19–21, 14–21	(silver) Runner-up

BWF Junior International Grand Prix tournament
BWF Junior International Challenge tournament
BWF Junior International Series tournament
BWF Junior Future Series tournament
