= 2017–18 Malaysia Purple League =

2017-18 Malaysia Purple League
Tournament details
- Dates: 18 Dec 2017 – 11 Feb 2018
- Edition: 4
- Competitors: Ampang Jaya BC; Bangsar Hawks BC; Cheras BC; Kepong BC; Petaling BC; Petaling Jaya BC; Puchong United BC; Serdang BC
- Venue: Sports Arena Sentosa, Kuala Lumpur (group stage); Arena of Stars, Genting Highlands (grand finals)
- Location: Malaysia
- Official website: purpleleague.com

Results
- Champions: (Selangor) Puchong United BC (1st title)
- Runners-up: (Kuala Lumpur) Kepong BC

2017–18 Malaysia Purple League (also known as SS Purple League for sponsorship reasons) is the fourth edition of Malaysia Purple League. It started on 18 December 2017 and will conclude on 11 February 2018. 2018 edition will features new format. It will consist of 28 league ties (each tie consisting of 5 matches) in Stage 1. Top six teams in Stage 1, then progressing to the Stage 2 (divided into 2 groups) to accumulates points. Finals stage featuring all six teams will be drawn accordingly to the overall accumulated points.

== Squads ==
Ampang Jaya BC	Bangsar Hawks BC	Cheras BC	Kepong BC
(Malaysia) Anna Cheong Ching Yik	(Indonesia) Ana Rovita	(Malaysia) Ahmad Maziri Mazlan	(Malaysia) Ai Wei Jian
(Malaysia) Chan Peng Soon	(Chinese Taipei) Cheng Yu-chieh	(Malaysia) Amirsyazwan Al-Razi	(Malaysia) Boon Xin Yuan
(Malaysia) Ch'ng Choo Han	(Malaysia) Crysvia Lim Peiy Zhean	(Malaysia) Chong Wei Feng	(Malaysia) Cheah Yee See
(Malaysia) Goh Jin Wei	(Malaysia) Dede Ryan Philip	(Malaysia) Chong Yee Han	(Malaysia) Goh Soon Huat
(Malaysia) Kisona Selvaduray	(Indonesia) Febby Angguni	(Singapore) Danny Bawa Chrisnanta	(Japan) Higuchi Natsuki
(Malaysia) Lee Shun Mei	(Thailand) Hiripong Sathorn	(Malaysia) Faiz Rozain	(Malaysia) Ho Yen Mei
(Indonesia) Lukhi Apri Nugroho	(Malaysia) Joyce Choong	(Indonesia) Fikri Ihsandi Hadmadi	(Chinese Taipei) Liao Min-chun
(Indonesia) Markis Kido	(Indonesia) Keshya Nurvita Hanadia	(Malaysia) Grace Chua Hui Zhen	(Malaysia) Lim Chi Wing
(Malaysia) Muhd Aiman Abd Malek	(China) Liu Lin	(Indonesia) Hendra Aprida Gunawan	(Malaysia) Muhd Nuraidil Adha Azman
(Malaysia) Muhd Syawal Mohd Ismail	(Malaysia) Muhd Aliff Nurizwan	(Malaysia) Izzat Farhan Azhar	(Hong Kong) Ng Wing Yung
(Vietnam) Nguyen Tien Minh	(Malaysia) Muhd Shahmi Abdillah	(Malaysia) Mohamad Arif Abdul Latif	(Malaysia) Nur Ernisa Alya Zainal Abiddin
(Malaysia) Nurul Farisha Abd Malek	(Malaysia) Muhd Syafiq A Sanusi	(Malaysia) Mohd Razif Abdul Latif	(Malaysia) Nur Mohd Azriyn Ayub
(Indonesia) Ririn Amelia	(Malaysia) Roobenraj Velayutham	(Malaysia) Muhd Amzzar Zainuddin	(Thailand) Pannawit Thongnuam
(Malaysia) Tan Jia Wei	(China) Shen Yabing	(Malaysia) Noor Hazwani Hazair	(Malaysia) Soong Joo Ven
(Malaysia) Tay Ken Yew	(Malaysia) Toh Ee Wei	(Thailand) Nuntakarn Aimsaard	(Chinese Taipei) Su Cheng-heng
(Malaysia) Wong Kha Yan	(Chinese Taipei) Wan Chia-hsin	(Malaysia) Payee Lim Peiy Yee	(India) Subhankar Dey
(China) Xu Wei	(Chinese Taipei) Wen Hao-yun	(Indonesia) Rusydina Antardayu Riodingin	(Japan) Sugino Ayaho
(China) Yan Runze	(China) Weng Hongyang	(Malaysia) Saranya Navaratnarajah	(Malaysia) Tan Chee Tean
(Malaysia) Zulfadli Zulkiffli	(China) Wu Song Jian	(Malaysia) Tan Boon Heong	(Malaysia) Tee Kai Wun
	(Malaysia) Yap Qar Siong	(Malaysia) Tan Wee Gieen	(Chinese Taipei) Yang Po-han
	(Malaysia) Yap Yee	(Singapore) Tan Wei Han	
	(China) Zhang Song Ye	(Singapore) Terry Hee Yong Kai	
	(Malaysia) Zulhelmi Zulkiffli	(Indonesia) Tommy Sugiarto	
		(Malaysia) Yeoh Seng Zoe	
Petaling BC	Petaling Jaya BC	Puchong United BC	Serdang BC
(Malaysia) Aaron Chia	(Thailand) Bodin Isara	(Malaysia) Adam Lau Yu Ming	(Chinese Taipei) Chen Hsiao-huan
(Indonesia) Agripina Prima Rahmanto	(Malaysia) Chooi Kah Ming	(Malaysia) Alfred Lau Yu Leong	(Malaysia) Derek Yeoh
(Indonesia) Alamsyah Yunus	(Malaysia) Goh Giap Chin	(Japan) Aya Ohori	(Chinese Taipei) Hu Ling-fang
(Malaysia) Chen Tang Jie	(Malaysia) Goh Yea Ching	(Chinese Taipei) Chou Tien-chen	(China) Huang Qing Hu
(Indonesia) Devi Tika Permatasari	(Malaysia) Jagdish Singh	(China) Deng Xuan	(Malaysia) Lee Ying Ying
(Malaysia) Goh V Shem	(Thailand) Khosit Phetpradab	(Malaysia) Lai Pei Jing	(Malaysia) Lee Zii Jia
(Indonesia) Hera Desi	(South Korea) Kim Sa-rang	(South Korea) Lee Hyo-jung	(Malaysia) Leong Jun Hao
(Malaysia) Ian Wong Jien Sern	(Malaysia) Labieb Muhzafar Lakamagi	(Malaysia) Lee Yan Sheng	(Malaysia) Lim Jee Lynn
(Indonesia) Irfan Fadhilah	(Hong Kong) Lee Cheuk Yiu	(Malaysia) Liew Daren	(Chinese Taipei) Lu Ching-yao
(Malaysia) Iskandar Zulkarnain Zainuddin	(Malaysia) Lee Zii Yii	(Malaysia) Lim Khim Wah	(Malaysia) Mohd Syazmil Idham
(Japan) Kenichi Tago	(Malaysia) Lim Chiew Sien	(Malaysia) Lin Woon Fui	(Malaysia) Ong Wei Khoon
(Malaysia) Kwek Yee Jian	(Malaysia) Low Juan Shen	(Hong Kong) Mak Hee Chun	(China) Pei Tianyi
(Malaysia) Lee Chong Wei	(Hong Kong) Or Chin Chung	(Malaysia) Mei Qili	(Malaysia) Tan Jinn Hwa
(Malaysia) Lim Yik Fong	(India) Prajakta Sawant	(Malaysia) Ng Qi Xuan	(Malaysia) Tan Sueh Jeou
(Malaysia) Lim Yin Fun	(Thailand) Sarita Suwanakijboriharn	(Malaysia) Ong Yew Sin	(Chinese Taipei) Tseng Min-hao
(Malaysia) Man Wei Chong	(Malaysia) Satheishtharan Ramachandran	(China) Pan Lu	(China) Xu Yiming
(Indonesia) Masita Mahmudin	(South Korea) Shin Baek-cheol	(Malaysia) Shevon Jemie Lai	(Malaysia) Yap Cheng Wen
(Malaysia) Shia Chun Kang	(Thailand) Supanida Katethong	(Malaysia) Tan Kian Meng	(China) Yu Chen
(Malaysia) Soh Wooi Yik	(Hong Kong) Tang Chun Man	(Malaysia) Teo Ee Yi	
(Malaysia) Tan Chun Seang	(Malaysia) Thanesh Veerappan	(China) Wang Zhengming	
(Malaysia) Teoh Mei Xing	(Malaysia) Ti Wei Chyi	(Hong Kong) Wei Nan	
(Malaysia) Tew Jia Jia	(Malaysia) Woon Khe Wei	(Malaysia) Wong Wai Jun	
(United States) Zhang Beiwen	(Malaysia) Yogendran Khrishnan	(South Korea) Yoo Yeon-seong	

== Stage 1 ==
=== Standings ===
Clubs	Pld	W	L	GF	GA	PF	PA	Pts
(Selangor) Puchong United BC	7	7	0	93	33	1242	979	93
(Selangor) Ampang Jaya BC	7	4	3	72	64	1206	1147	72
(Kuala Lumpur) Kepong BC	7	3	4	70	72	1274	1269	70
(Kuala Lumpur) Cheras BC	7	4	3	70	63	1194	1170	70
(Selangor) Petaling BC	7	5	2	68	63	1206	1180	68
(Selangor) Petaling Jaya BC	7	4	3	67	72	1257	1255	67
(Kuala Lumpur) Bangsar Hawks BC	7	0	7	49	89	1086	1335	49
(Selangor) Serdang BC	7	1	6	46	79	1054	1184	46

=== Fixtures ===
==== Round-robin ====
Date	Team 1	Result	Team 2
18 Dec	Petaling Jaya BC	11 – 8	Serdang BC
18 Dec	Petaling BC	12 – 7	Kepong BC
19 Dec	Ampang Jaya BC	10 – 8	Cheras BC
19 Dec	Bangsar Hawks BC	2 – 15	Puchong United BC
20 Dec	Ampang Jaya BC	2 – 15	Bangsar Hawks BC
20 Dec	Petaling BC	11 – 8	Serdang BC
21 Dec	Petaling Jaya BC	3 – 15	Puchong United BC
21 Dec	Kepong BC	12 – 8	Cheras BC
22 Dec	Kepong BC	10 – 8	Serdang BC
22 Dec	Ampang Jaya BC	10 – 13	Petaling Jaya BC
23 Dec	Bangsar Hawks BC	11 – 12	Cheras BC
23 Dec	Petaling BC	3 – 13	Puchong United BC
26 Dec	Bangsar Hawks BC	6 – 14	Petaling Jaya BC
26 Dec	Ampang Jaya BC	6 – 12	Petaling BC
27 Dec	Kepong BC	7 – 12	Puchong United BC
27 Dec	Serdang BC	7 – 11	Cheras BC
28 Dec	Bangsar Hawks BC	9 – 13	Petaling BC
28 Dec	Ampang Jaya BC	12 – 11	Kepong BC
29 Dec	Serdang BC	3 – 14	Puchong United BC
29 Dec	Petaling Jaya BC	5 – 12	Cheras BC
30 Dec	Bangsar Hawks BC	8 – 12	Kepong BC
30 Dec	Petaling Jaya BC	9 – 10	Petaling BC
4 Jan	Ampang Jaya BC	15 – 1	Serdang BC
4 Jan	Puchong United BC	11 – 8	Cheras BC
5 Jan	Petaling BC	7 – 11	Cheras BC
5 Jan	Bangsar Hawks BC	7 – 11	Serdang BC
6 Jan	Petaling Jaya BC	12 – 11	Kepong BC
6 Jan	Ampang Jaya BC	7 – 13	Puchong United BC

Source: BAM TS website

==== 7th-8th place playoff ====
Date	Team 1	Result	Team 2
27 Jan	Bangsar Hawks BC	10 – 7	Serdang BC

== Stage 2 ==
=== Overall standings ===
Clubs	Pld	W	L	GF	GA	PF	PA	Pts
(Selangor) Puchong United BC	9	8	1	106	53	1519	1274	106
(Kuala Lumpur) Cheras BC	9	6	3	97	73	1561	1452	97
(Selangor) Petaling BC	9	7	2	94	76	1564	1485	94
(Selangor) Ampang Jaya BC	9	5	4	90	88	1552	1523	90
(Kuala Lumpur) Kepong BC	9	3	6	86	95	1593	1611	86
(Selangor) Petaling Jaya BC	9	4	5	80	95	1529	1594	80

=== Fixtures ===
Date	Team 1	Result	Team 2
Group A
26 Jan	Puchong United BC	9 – 7	Petaling Jaya BC
27 Jan	Cheras BC	14 – 6	Petaling Jaya BC
28 Jan	Puchong United BC	4 – 13	Cheras BC
Group B
26 Jan	Kepong BC	6 – 12	Petaling BC
27 Jan	Ampang Jaya BC	11 – 10	Kepong BC
28 Jan	Ampang Jaya BC	7 – 14	Petaling BC

== Finals stage ==
Quarterfinals
4	(Selangor) Ampang Jaya BC	4
6	(Selangor) Petaling Jaya BC	9
3	(Selangor) Petaling BC	8
5	(Kuala Lumpur) Kepong BC	11

Semifinals
1	(Selangor) Puchong United BC	10
6	(Selangor) Petaling Jaya BC	3
2	(Kuala Lumpur) Cheras BC	4
5	(Kuala Lumpur) Kepong BC	10
5th & 6th
4	(Selangor) Ampang Jaya BC	7
3	(Selangor) Petaling BC	10

Finals
1	(Selangor) Puchong United BC	10
5	(Kuala Lumpur) Kepong BC	8
3rd & 4th
6	(Selangor) Petaling Jaya BC	9
2	(Kuala Lumpur) Cheras BC	2

2017-18 Purple League champions

First title

== Final standings ==
Pos	Club
1st place, gold medalist(s)	(Selangor) Puchong United BC
2nd place, silver medalist(s)	(Kuala Lumpur) Kepong BC
3rd place, bronze medalist(s)	(Selangor) Petaling Jaya BC
4	(Kuala Lumpur) Cheras BC
5	(Selangor) Petaling BC
6	(Selangor) Ampang Jaya BC
7	(Kuala Lumpur) Bangsar Hawks BC
8	(Selangor) Serdang BC
