= 2015–16 Malaysia Purple League =

2015-16 Malaysia Purple League
Tournament details
- Dates: 4 Nov 2015 – 17 Jan 2016
- Edition: 2
- Competitors: Ampang Jaya BC; Bangsar Hawks BC; Cheras BC; Kajang BC; Kepong BC; Klang United BC; Muar City BC; Nusajaya BC; Petaling BC; Petaling Jaya BC; Puchong United BC; Serdang BC
- Venue: Sports Arena Sentosa, Kuala Lumpur (group stage); Arena of Stars, Genting Highlands (grand finals)
- Location: Malaysia
- Official website: purpleleague.com

Results
- Champions: (Johor) Muar City BC (2nd title)
- Runners-up: (Selangor) Puchong United BC

2015–16 Malaysia Purple League (also known as Resorts World Genting Purple League for sponsorship reasons) is the second edition of Malaysia Purple League. It started on 4 November 2015 and concluded on 17 January 2016. It consisted of 66 league ties (each tie consisting of 5 matches) in Stage 1. Top eight teams in Stage 1, then progressing to the finals stage.

== Squads ==
Ampang Jaya BC	Bangsar Hawks BC	Cheras BC	Kajang BC
(Denmark) Anders Skaarup Rasmussen	(Indonesia) Agripina Prima Rahmanto	(Indonesia) Afiat Yuris Wirawan	(Singapore) Chayut Triyachart
(Malaysia) Anna Cheong	(Malaysia) Ahmad Zaid Zainal	(Indonesia) Alamsyah Yunus	(Malaysia) Chiang Jiann Shiarng
(Hong Kong) Lee Cheuk Yiu	(Singapore) Danny Bawa Chrisnanta	(Malaysia) Ahmad Maziri Mazlan	(Malaysia) Boon Wei Ying
(Malaysia) Chin Chuan Jie	(Indonesia) Fazandra Yusfiandik	(Malaysia) Amirsyazwan Al-Razi	(Malaysia) Dede Ryan Philip
(Malaysia) Goh Giap Chin	(Indonesia) Irfan Fadhilah	(Malaysia) Chong Chun Ling	(Malaysia) Chan Wan Ran
(Indonesia) Dionysius Hayom Rumbaka	(Malaysia) Lee Jian Yi	(Indonesia) Febby Angguni	(Malaysia) Eizlan Shah Misfahul Muneer
(Japan) Kento Momota	(Malaysia) Leong Wen Hao	(Australia) Joyce Choong	(Malaysia) Kwek Yee Jian
(Japan) Kenta Nishimoto	(Singapore) Loh Kean Hean	(Malaysia) Ng Hui Lin	(Chinese Taipei) Lee Sheng-mu
(Malaysia) Desiree Siow	(Malaysia) Mohd Razlan Shah Mohd Ridzuan Shah	(Malaysia) Payee Lim Peiy Yee	(Thailand) Duanganong Aroonkesorn
(Indonesia) Hera Desi	(Malaysia) Muhd Adib Haiqal Nuriwan	(South Korea) Hwang Ji-man	(Chinese Taipei) Hsieh Pei-chen
(Malaysia) Ho Yen Mei	(Malaysia) Muhd Aliff Nurizwan	(Malaysia) Mohd Lutfi Zaim Abdul Khalid	(Chinese Taipei) Hsu Ya-ching
(Malaysia) Ng Hui Ern	(Malaysia) Muhd Amzzar Zainuddin	(Thailand) Sarita Suwannakitborihan	(Malaysia) Man Wei Chong
(Malaysia) Shevon Jemie Lai	(Indonesia) Thomi Azizan Mahbub	(Indonesia) Markis Kido	(Malaysia) Lim Peiy Zhean
(Denmark) Kim Astrup	(Malaysia) Mas Ami Abu Bakar Sidik	(Malaysia) Soong Fie Cho	(Malaysia) Muhammad Iqram Azman
(Malaysia) Kuan Kam Chung	(Malaysia) Zulhelmi Zulkifli	(Malaysia) Mohamad Arif Abdul Latif	(Malaysia) Muhammad Ziyad Md Tah
(Malaysia) Mohd Syawal Mohd Ismail	(Indonesia) Aprilia Yuswandari	(Malaysia) Vivian Hoo	(Thailand) Natcha Saengchote
(Malaysia) Ong Yew Sin	(Malaysia) Lee Zii Yii	(Malaysia) Mohamad Razif Abdul Latif	(Malaysia) Muhd Aiman Abd Malik
(Indonesia) Rendy Sugiarto	(Malaysia) Kavita Sylvia Kumares	(Malaysia) Mohd Zakry Abdul Latif	(Malaysia) Ooi Swee Wenn
(Singapore) Ronald Susilo	(Indonesia) Maria Febe Kusumastuti	(Malaysia) Muhammad Hafifi Hashim	(Vietnam) Nguyễn Tiến Minh
(Indonesia) Putra Wibowo Setyaldi	(Malaysia) Nurhani Ab. Aziz	(Malaysia) Muhammad Hafizi Hashim	(Thailand) Nopparut Hiripongsathorn
(Indonesia) Sony Dwi Kuncoro	(Indonesia) Pia Zebadiah Bernadet	(Malaysia) Ng Sun Ly	(Malaysia) See Phui Leng
(Malaysia) Tan Jia Wei	(India) P. V. Sindhu	(Indonesia) Nugroho Andi Saputro	(Vietnam) Vũ Thị Trang
(Malaysia) Tay Ken Yew	(Indonesia) Weni Anggraini	(Malaysia) Nur Mohd Azriyn Ayub	(Malaysia) Nur Akmal Mohd Rumsani
(Singapore) Terry Hee		(Indonesia) Riky Widianto	(Malaysia) Nur Izzuddin
(Japan) Yoneda Kenji		(Malaysia) Soong Joo Ven	(Malaysia) Shahrul Shazwan Shahrul Khairi
		(Malaysia) Tan Aik Quan	(Thailand) Sutichon Pol-gul
		(Indonesia) Vega Vio Nirwanda	(Malaysia) Tee Yong Jie
		(Malaysia) Zulfadli Zulkiffli	(Malaysia) Thanesh Veerappan
			(Thailand) Wannawat Ampunsuwan
Kepong BC	Klang United BC	Muar City BC	Nusajaya BC
(Malaysia) Ai Wei Jian	(Indonesia) Alwi Mahardika	(Malaysia) Chin Kah Mun	(Malaysia) Aaron Chia
(Hong Kong) Deng Xuan	(India) Juhi Dewangan	(Malaysia) Chan Peng Soon	(Malaysia) Amelia Alicia Anscelly
(Indonesia) Ganis Nurahmandani	(Malaysia) Chin Wai Kin	(Malaysia) Chow Mei Kuan	(Indonesia) Arya Maulana Aldiartama
(Indonesia) Andrei Adistia	(Malaysia) Lee Meng Yean	(Malaysia) Au Kok Leong	(Hong Kong) Chau Hoi Wah
(Malaysia) Chan Ren Cong	(Malaysia) Chooi Kah Ming	(Malaysia) Chow Pak Chuu	(Thailand) Boonsak Ponsana
(Malaysia) Chong Wei Feng	(China) Liu Lin	(Malaysia) Goh Liu Ying	(Malaysia) Cheah Yee See
(Malaysia) Lim Yin Loo	(Malaysia) Yap Rui Chen	(Indonesia) Fikri Ihsandi Hadmadi	(Malaysia) Julia Wong Pei Xian
(Malaysia) Li Mei Qi	(Malaysia) Yap Yee	(Indonesia) Gregoria Mariska Tunjung	(Malaysia) Chang Hun Pin
(Malaysia) Ng Qi Xuan	(Malaysia) Yap Zhen	(South Korea) Han Sang-hoon	(Malaysia) Cheam June Wei
(Indonesia) Ririn Amelia	(United States) Beiwen Zhang	(South Korea) Kim Mun-hee	(Malaysia) Lai I Ting
(Malaysia) Lai Pei Jing	(Indonesia) Evert Sukamta	(South Korea) Lee Yong-dae	(Malaysia) Chong Yee Han
(Malaysia) Tee Jing Yi	(Indonesia) Frengky Wijaya Putra	(South Korea) Lee Hyo-jung	(Malaysia) Lee Ying Ying
(Indonesia) Hendra Aprida Gunawan	(India) Gurusai Dutt	(South Korea) Lee Hyun-il	(Malaysia) Goh Soon Huat
(Thailand) Kantawat Leelavecha	(Indonesia) Kevin Sanjaya Sukamuljo	(Indonesia) Rusydina Antardayu Riodingin	(Malaysia) Goh Sze Fei
(Thailand) Krit Tantianankul	(Malaysia) Leong Jun Hao	(Japan) Saena Kawakami	(Singapore) Liang Xiaoyu
(Malaysia) Low Juan Shen	(Denmark) Mads Conrad-Petersen	(Malaysia) Tan Bin Shen	(Malaysia) Sannatasah Saniru
(Malaysia) Ong Jian Guo	(Denmark) Mads Pieler Kolding	(Malaysia) Tan Boon Heong	(Singapore) Yeo Jia Min
(Indonesia) Panji Akbar Sudrajat	(Malaysia) Mohd Alshukri Abd Rahman	(Malaysia) Tan Wee Kiong	(Hong Kong) Yip Pui Yin
(Hong Kong) Lee Chun Hei	(Malaysia) Muhd Hakem Norrazi	(Malaysia) Tan Chun Seang	(Indonesia) Yulia Yosephine Susanto
(Indonesia) Shesar Hiren Rhustavito	(Indonesia) Muhammad Rian Ardianto	(Indonesia) Tommy Sugiarto	(Malaysia) Haw Yong Yuan
(Malaysia) Soo Kar Seong	(Indonesia) Sabar Karyaman Gutama	(Malaysia) Zulfaiz Zulkifli	(Malaysia) Hoon Thien How
(Malaysia) Tai An Khang	(India) Shreyansh Jaiswal		(Malaysia) Lai Zing Neng
(Malaysia) Tan Kah Kok	(Indonesia) Simon Santoso		(Malaysia) Lim Khim Wah
(Hong Kong) Wei Nan	(Malaysia) Teo Ee Yi		(Malaysia) Lim Ming Chuen
(Malaysia) Woon Man Chun	(India) Venkat Gaurav Prasad		(Singapore) Loh Kean Yew
	(Singapore) Derek Wong		(Chinese Taipei) Lu Chia-hung
	(Malaysia) Yew Hong Woon		(Malaysia) Ooi Swee Khoon
			(Hong Kong) Tam Chun Hei
			(Malaysia) Tan Jinn Hwa
			(Malaysia) Tan Kian Meng
			(Malaysia) Tan Teck Han
			(Malaysia) Teo Kok Siang
Petaling BC	Petaling Jaya BC	Puchong United BC	Serdang BC
(Indonesia) Ardiansyah Putra	(Malaysia) Ahmadi Saman	(Malaysia) Liew Daren	(Malaysia) Adam Lau
(Indonesia) Ana Rovita	(New Zealand) Chan Yun Lung	(Indonesia) Andre Kurniawan Tedjono	(Malaysia) Alfred Lau
(Malaysia) Chen Jia Huo	(Hong Kong) Cheung Ngan Yi	(Indonesia) Adriyanti Firdasari	(Malaysia) Chang Yee Jun
(Malaysia) Chen Tang Jie	(Indonesia) Andre Marteen	(Chinese Taipei) Hsueh Hsuan-yi	(China) Chen Zhuofu
(Indonesia) Fernando Kurniawan	(Thailand) Bodin Isara	(Japan) Aya Ohori	(Chinese Taipei) Chen Hsiao-huan
(Malaysia) Goh V Shem	(South Korea) Kim Hyo-min	(South Korea) Lee Jae-jin	(Malaysia) Goh Jin Wei
(Malaysia) Iskandar Zulkarnain Zainuddin	(Canada) Michelle Li	(Japan) Ayumi Mine	(China) Han Luxuan
(Indonesia) Devi Tika Permatasari	(Malaysia) Chan Kwong Beng	(Hong Kong) Ng Ka Long	(China) Lina Huang
(Indonesia) Elisabeth Purwaningtyas	(Indonesia) Millicent Wiranto	(Chinese Taipei) Cheng Wen-hsing	(Chinese Taipei) Chen Chung-jen
(Japan) Hashizume Arisa	(Thailand) Nitchaon Jindapol	(Chinese Taipei) Chiang Ying-li	(Hong Kong) Tse Ying Suet
(Malaysia) Lim Yin Fun	(Malaysia) Darren Isaac Devadass	(Denmark) Christinna Pedersen	(China) Wu Qianqian
(India) Srikanth Kidambi	(South Korea) Heo Kwang-hee	(Malaysia) Ow Yao Han	(Malaysia) Chia Yi Jie
(Japan) Minatsu Mitani	(Malaysia) Jagdish Singh	(Malaysia) Lai Pei Jing	(China) Xu Wei
(Malaysia) Teoh Mei Xing	(India) Prajakta Sawant	(South Korea) Son Wan-ho	(Malaysia) Yap Cheng Wen
(Japan) Yui Hashimoto	(Indonesia) Vita Marissa	(Malaysia) Syed Akhbar Shah S Mustakim	(Malaysia) Chua Khek Wei
(India) Parupalli Kashyap	(Malaysia) Woon Khe Wei	(Malaysia) Tan Wee Gieen	(Chinese Taipei) Huang Po-jui
(Japan) Kenichi Tago	(Malaysia) Yang Li Lian	(Chinese Taipei) Liang Ting-yu	(Malaysia) Lee Jian Yi
(Malaysia) Lew Ming Hui	(Malaysia) Yogendran Khrishnan	(Chinese Taipei) Pai Yu-po	(Malaysia) Lee Zii Jia
(Malaysia) Ng Di Hua	(Malaysia) Lee Chong Wei	(Thailand) Tanongsak Saensomboonsuk	(Malaysia) Lim Chi Wing
(Malaysia) Shia Chun Kang	(Thailand) Khosit Phetpradab	(Malaysia) Soo Teck Zhi	(Malaysia) Lim Zhen Ting
(Malaysia) Tan Vi Hen	(Malaysia) Koo Kien Keat	(Malaysia) Peck Yen Wei	(Chinese Taipei) Lu Ching-yao
(Malaysia) Yeoh Seng Zoe	(South Korea) Kang Ji-wook	(South Korea) Sung Ji-hyun	(Vietnam) Nguyễn Hoàng Hảm
(Indonesia) Trikusuma Wardhana	(South Korea) Lee Sang-jun	(Chinese Taipei) Tang Wan-yi	(Malaysia) Ooi Zi Heng
(Indonesia) Wisnu Yuli Prasetyo	(China) Li Qi	(Malaysia) Victor Ong Jing Khai	(China) Pei Tianyi
	(Malaysia) Muhammad Hafiz Hashim	(Malaysia) Wong Fai Yin	(Netherlands) Ruud Bosch
	(Thailand) Nipitphon Phuangphuapet	(Malaysia) Yew Hong Kheng	(Malaysia) Tan Chee Tean
	(Thailand) Songphon Anugritayawon	(South Korea) Yoo Yeon-seong	(Chinese Taipei) Tien Tzu-chieh
	(Hong Kong) Or Chin Chung		(Chinese Taipei) Tseng Min-hao
	(Malaysia) Roni Tan Wee Long		(Chinese Taipei) Wang Chi-lin
	(Hong Kong) Tang Chun Man		(Chinese Taipei) Wang Chih-hao
	(Malaysia) Satheishtharan Ramachandran		(Chinese Taipei) Wang Tzu-wei
	(Malaysia) Vountus Indra Mawan		(Malaysia) Soh Wooi Yik
	(Malaysia) Shahzan Shah		(China) Xie Binyu

== Standings ==
Team	Pts	Pld	W	L	GW	GL
(Johor) Muar City BC	115	8	0	0	115	27
(Kuala Lumpur) Cheras BC	81	6	0	1	81	49
(Selangor) Petaling BC	92	5	0	3	92	65
(Selangor) Petaling Jaya BC	79	5	0	2	79	55
(Selangor) Puchong United BC	74	5	0	2	76	60
(Selangor) Serdang BC	78	5	0	3	78	74
(Kuala Lumpur) Kepong BC	74	5	0	3	74	72
(Selangor) Ampang Jaya BC	69	2	0	6	69	76
(Johor) Nusajaya BC	61	2	0	6	61	89
(Selangor) Klang United BC	59	2	0	6	59	91
(Kuala Lumpur) Bangsar Hawks BC	46	1	0	7	46	93
(Selangor) Kajang BC	22	0	0	7	22	99

2015-16 Purple League champions

Second title
