= 2016–17 Malaysia Purple League =

Tournament details
- Dates: 12 Dec 2016 – 12 Feb 2017
- Edition: 3
- Competitors: Ampang Jaya BC; Bangsar Hawks BC; BU Dragons BC; Kepong BC; Klang City BC; Muar BC; Petaling BC; Petaling Jaya BC; Puchong United BC; Serdang BC
- Venue: Gem In Mall, Cyberjaya (group stages); Arena of Stars, Genting Highlands (grand finals)
- Location: Malaysia
- Official website: purpleleague.com

Results
- Champions: (Selangor) Petaling Jaya BC (1st title)
- Runners-up: (Selangor) Puchong United BC

2016–17 Malaysia Purple League (also known as SS Purple League for sponsorship reasons) is the third edition of Malaysia Purple League. It started on 12 December 2016 and concluded on 12 February 2017. It consisted of 45 league ties (each tie consisting of 5 matches) in Stage 1. Top six teams in Stage 1, then progressing to the finals stage.

== Squads ==
Ampang Jaya BC	Bangsar Hawks BC	BU Dragons BC	Kepong BC	Klang City BC
(Malaysia) Anna Cheong	(Indonesia) Ana Rovita	(Hong Kong) Chan Yan Kit	(Malaysia) Aaron Chia	(Malaysia) Cheah Yee See
(India) Ajay Jayaram	(Malaysia) Chang Lip Seng	(Chinese Taipei) Chiang Mei-hui	(Malaysia) Ai Wei Jian	(Malaysia) Chin Kah Mun
(Malaysia) Cheam June Wei	(Malaysia) Chian Chin Yong	(Malaysia) Chooi Kah Ming	(Denmark) Anders Skaarup	(Malaysia) Chin Wai Kin
(Malaysia) Desiree Siow	(Malaysia) Crysvia Lim Peiy Zhean	(Malaysia) Chow Mei Kuan	(Indonesia) Aprilia Yuswandari	(Singapore) Derek Wong
(Malaysia) Ho Yen Mei	(Singapore) Danny Bawa Chrisnanta	(Malaysia) Chow Pak Chuu	(Thailand) Busanan Ongbamrungphan	(Malaysia) Hoo Pang Ron
(Denmark) Kim Astrup	(China) Du Yuhang	(Denmark) Emil Holst	(Thailand) Chayanit Chaladchalam	(Malaysia) Kisona Selvaduray
(Malaysia) Kuan Kam Chung	(China) Gao Xiangcheng	(Malaysia) Goh Jin Wei	(Malaysia) Chong Yee Han	(Malaysia) Leong Jun Hao
(Hong Kong) Lee Cheuk Yiu	(Singapore) Hendra Wijaya	(Malaysia) Goh Soon Huat	(Indonesia) Hendra Aprida Gunawan	(Malaysia) Low Hang Yee
(Indonesia) Lukhi Apri Nugroho	(Chinese Taipei) Hsu Ya-ching	(Malaysia) Lai Pei Jing	(Malaysia) Lim Chi Wing	(Malaysia) Muhammad Sufiyuddin
(Malaysia) Muhammad Syawal	(Indonesia) Irfan Fadhilah	(Hong Kong) Mak Hee Chun	(Japan) Moe Araki	(Malaysia) Muhd Umar Al-Qhatab
(Vietnam) Nguyen Tien Minh	(Malaysia) Joyce Choong	(Indonesia) Markis Kido	(Malaysia) Mohd Razif Abdul Latif	(Finland) Nanna Vainio
(Thailand) Nitchaon Jindapol	(Malaysia) Lee Ying Ying	(Thailand) Mek Narongrit	(Malaysia) Muhammad Hafiz Hashim	(Malaysia) Ng Tsin Yeong
(Thailand) Phutthaporn	(Singapore) Loh Kean Hean	(China) Ou Xuanyi	(Malaysia) Muhd Sharul Nazim	(Malaysia) Ong Jian Guo
(Indonesia) Ririn Amelia	(Malaysia) Muhammad Syazmil Idham	(Hong Kong) Tam Chun Hei	(Malaysia) Nur Mohd Azriyn Ayub	(Chinese Taipei) Pai Yu-po
(Thailand) Suppanyu Avihingsanon	(Malaysia) Muhammad Aliff Nurizwan	(Malaysia) Tan Kian Meng	(Thailand) Pannawit Thongnuam	(Malaysia) Tai An Khang
(Malaysia) Tan Jia Wei	(Malaysia) Muhammad Amzzar	(Malaysia) Tan Wee Kiong	(Malaysia) Peck Yen Wei	(Malaysia) Tan Sueh Jeou
(Malaysia) Tan Kah Kok	(Malaysia) Muhammad Syafiq	(Indonesia) Tommy Sugiarto	(Thailand) Porntip Buranaprasertsuk	(Malaysia) Tan Swee Seng
(Singapore) Tan Wei Han	(Malaysia) Payee Lim Piey Yee	(Hong Kong) Wei Nan	(Thailand) Savitree Amitrapai	(Malaysia) Thinaah Muralitharan
(Malaysia) Tan Yip Jiun	(China) Pei Tianyi	(China) Xu Yiming	(Malaysia) Soong Joo Ven	(Malaysia) Vivian Hoo
(Malaysia) Tay Ken Yew	(Indonesia) Thomi Azizan Mahbub	(Malaysia) Yap Zhen	(Republic of Ireland) Scott Evans	(Chinese Taipei) Yang Po-han
(Singapore) Terry Hee Yong Kai	(Malaysia) Toh Ee Wei	(Hong Kong) Yeung Nga Ting	(Malaysia) Tan Chee Tean	
(China) Xu Wei	(Chinese Taipei) Wan Chia-Hsin	(Hong Kong) Yip Pui Yin	(Malaysia) Tee Jing Yi	
	(Indonesia) Weni Anggraini	(United States) Zhang Beiwen	(Thailand) Trawut Potieng	
	(Hong Kong) Yonny Chung			
	(China) Zhou Bowei			
Muar BC	Petaling BC	Petaling Jaya BC	Puchong United BC	Serdang BC
(Indonesia) Ardiansyah Putra	(Indonesia) Agripina Prima Rahmanto	(Thailand) Bodin Isara	(Indonesia) Alamsyah Yunus	(Indonesia) Afiat Yuris
(Malaysia) Chan Peng Soon	(Indonesia) Andrei Adistia	(Malaysia) Darren Isaac	(Malaysia) Chong Wei Feng	(Chinese Taipei) Chen Hsiao-huan
(Indonesia) Dionysius Hayom	(Malaysia) Chen Jia Huo	(China) Deng Xuan	(Chinese Taipei) Chou Tien-chen	(Malaysia) Chiam Xue Qi
(Indonesia) Fikri Ihsandi Hadmadi	(Malaysia) Chen Tang Jie	(Malaysia) Goh Giap Chin	(Denmark) Christinna Pedersen	(Malaysia) Derek Yeoh
(Indonesia) Hendra Setiawan	(Indonesia) Devi Tika Permatasari	(Malaysia) Goh Yea Ching	(Malaysia) Goh Liu Ying	(China) Han Luxuan
(Malaysia) Hoon Thien How	(Malaysia) Goh V Shem	(India) Harsheel Dani	(China) Hui Xirui	(Chinese Taipei) Hu Ling-fang
(South Korea) Lee Hyo-jung	(Indonesia) Hera Desi	(Malaysia) Jagdish Singh	(Chinese Taipei) Lee Jhe-huei	(Hong Kong) Lee Chun Hei
(South Korea) Lee Hyun-il	(Malaysia) Ian Wong Jien Sern	(Thailand) Khosit Phetpradab	(Malaysia) Lee Jian Yi	(Malaysia) Lee Zii Jia
(Malaysia) Lee Meng Yean	(Malaysia) Iskandar Zulkarnain	(South Korea) Kim Sa-rang	(Chinese Taipei) Lee Yang	(Malaysia) Lim Jee Lynn
(South Korea) Lee Yong-dae	(Japan) Kenichi Tago	(Malaysia) Koo Kien Keat	(Malaysia) Lim Khim Wah	(China) Liu Lin
(Malaysia) Mohd Arif Abdul Latif	(Malaysia) Lee Chong Wei	(Malaysia) Lim Chiew Sien	(Malaysia) Lim Zhen Ting	(Chinese Taipei) Lu Chia-hung
(Indonesia) Rusydina Antardayu	(Malaysia) Liew Daren	(Thailand) Nipitphon Phuangphuapet	(Malaysia) Low Juan Shen	(Malaysia) Ong Wei Khoon
(Japan) Saena Kawakami	(Malaysia) Lim Yin Fun	(Hong Kong) Or Chin Chung	(Malaysia) Ong Yew Sin	(Malaysia) Ooi Swee Khoon
(China) Shen Yaying	(Malaysia) Man Wei Chong	(India) Prajakta Sawant	(China) Pan Lu	(Malaysia) Ooi Zi Heng
(Malaysia) Soniia Cheah	(Malaysia) Muhd Aiman Abd Malek	(Thailand) Sarita Suwanakijboriharn	(Japan) Sayaka Takahashi	(China) Ou Xuanyi
(China) Suo Di	(Malaysia) Ng Jun Yan	(Malaysia) R Satheishtharan	(Malaysia) Shevon Jemie Lai	(China) Shen Yabing
(Malaysia) Tan Boon Heong	(Indonesia) Riky Widianto	(South Korea) Shin Baek-cheol	(Malaysia) Soo Teck Zhi	(Malaysia) Sim Fong Hau
(Malaysia) Tan Chun Seang	(Malaysia) Shia Chun Kang	(Thailand) Supanida Katethong	(Malaysia) Syed Akhbar	(Malaysia) Soh Wooi Yik
(Malaysia) Tan Wee Gieen	(Malaysia) Tan Vi Hen	(Indonesia) Sony Dwi Kuncoro	(Chinese Taipei) Tai Tzu-ying	(Malaysia) Soong Fie Cho
(Malaysia) Teo Ee Yi	(Malaysia) Tew Jia Jia	(Hong Kong) Tang Chun Man	(Malaysia) Tan Chee Tean	(Malaysia) Tan Jinn Hwa
(Malaysia) Teo Kok Siang	(China) Wang Yihan	(Malaysia) Woon Khe Wei	(Thailand) T Saensomboonsuk	(Chinese Taipei) Tsai Chia-hsin
(Indonesia) Vita Marissa	(Malaysia) Yap Rui Chen	(Malaysia) Yogendran Khrishnan	(Malaysia) Teoh Mei Xing	(Chinese Taipei) Tseng Min-hao
(Malaysia) Zulfadli Zulkiffli	(Malaysia) Yap Yee		(Malaysia) Ti Wei Chyi	(China) Xu Yiming
(Malaysia) Zulfaiz Zulkiffli	(China) Zhao Yunlei		(Malaysia) Victor Ong	(Malaysia) Yap Cheng Wen
(Malaysia) Zulhelmi Zulkiffli			(Chinese Taipei) Wang Tzu-wei	(China) Yu Chen
			(South Korea) Yoo Yeon-seong	

== Stage 1 ==
=== Standings ===
Clubs	Pld	W	D	L	GF	GA	PF	PA	Pts
(Johor) Muar BC	9	7	0	2	103	59	1487	1223	103
(Selangor) BU Dragons BC	9	8	0	1	97	62	1427	1239	97
(Selangor) Puchong United BC	9	6	1	2	94	71	1455	1376	94
(Selangor) Petaling Jaya BC	9	5	0	4	93	78	1496	1390	93
(Selangor) Ampang Jaya BC	9	5	0	4	92	77	1500	1398	92
(Selangor) Petaling BC	9	4	1	4	87	73	1426	1299	87
(Kuala Lumpur) Kepong BC	9	4	0	5	74	87	1338	1404	74
(Selangor) Serdang BC	9	3	0	6	71	89	1321	1439	71
(Kuala Lumpur) Bangsar Hawks BC	9	1	0	8	59	105	1264	1555	59
(Selangor) Klang City BC	9	1	0	8	45	114	1188	1579	45

=== Fixtures ===
==== Round-robin ====
Matchday	Date	Team 1	Result	Team 2
MD1	12 Dec	Puchong United BC	8–9	BU Dragons BC
MD1	13 Dec	Klang City BC	2–15	Ampang Jaya BC
MD1	13 Dec	Petaling Jaya BC	11–7	Kepong BC
MD1	14 Dec	Bangsar Hawks BC	8–10	Serdang BC
MD1	14 Dec	Petaling BC	8–10	Muar BC
MD2	19 Dec	Klang City BC	6–13	Petaling Jaya BC
MD2	19 Dec	Muar BC	9–10	Ampang Jaya BC
MD2	20 Dec	Puchong United BC	12–7	Serdang BC
MD2	20 Dec	Bangsar Hawks BC	8–9	Kepong BC
MD2	21 Dec	Petaling BC	8–10	BU Dragons BC
MD3	21 Dec	Klang City BC	11–7	Bangsar Hawks BC
MD3	22 Dec	Muar BC	7–11	BU Dragons BC
MD3	22 Dec	Petaling BC	15–1	Serdang BC
MD3	23 Dec	Puchong United BC	10–9	Kepong BC
MD3	23 Dec	Petaling Jaya BC	14–6	Ampang Jaya BC
MD4	24 Dec	Muar BC	12–6	Serdang BC
MD4	24 Dec	Petaling Jaya BC	13–6	Bangsar Hawks BC
MD4	24 Dec	Klang City BC	4–13	Puchong United BC
MD4	27 Dec	Petaling BC	5–13	Kepong BC
MD4	27 Dec	BU Dragons BC	11–8	Ampang Jaya BC
MD5	28 Dec	Petaling Jaya BC	9–11	Puchong United BC
MD5	28 Dec	Klang City BC	3–15	Petaling BC
MD5	29 Dec	BU Dragons BC	9–6	Serdang BC
MD5	29 Dec	Muar BC	12–6	Kepong BC
MD5	30 Dec	Bangsar Hawks BC	11–10	Ampang Jaya BC

Matchday	Date	Team 1	Result	Team 2
MD6	30 Dec	Petaling Jaya BC	7–11	Petaling BC
MD6	31 Dec	Bangsar Hawks BC	5–13	Puchong United BC
MD6	31 Dec	Serdang BC	9–11	Ampang Jaya BC
MD6	31 Dec	BU Dragons BC	7–10	Kepong BC
MD6	2 Jan	Klang City BC	1–15	Muar BC
MD7	2 Jan	Serdang BC	15–3	Kepong BC
MD7	3 Jan	Petaling Jaya BC	5–13	Muar BC
MD7	3 Jan	Klang City BC	5–13	BU Dragons BC
MD7	4 Jan	Bangsar Hawks BC	8–11	Petaling BC
MD7	4 Jan	Puchong United BC	10–8	Ampang Jaya BC
MD8	5 Jan	Bangsar Hawks BC	4–14	Muar BC
MD8	5 Jan	Puchong United BC	9–9	Petaling BC
MD8	6 Jan	Kepong BC	6–12	Ampang Jaya BC
MD8	6 Jan	Klang City BC	6–12	Serdang BC
MD8	7 Jan	Petaling Jaya BC	8–13	BU Dragons BC
MD9	7 Jan	Puchong United BC	8–11	Muar BC
MD9	7 Jan	Petaling BC	5–12	Ampang Jaya BC
MD9	8 Jan	Klang City BC	7–11	Kepong BC
MD9	8 Jan	Petaling Jaya BC	13–5	Serdang BC
MD9	8 Jan	Bangsar Hawks BC	2–14	BU Dragons BC

Source: BAM TS website

==== 7th–10th place playoff ====
7th–10th semifinals
(Kuala Lumpur) Kepong BC	w/o
(Selangor) Klang City BC
(Kuala Lumpur) Bangsar Hawks BC	9 (157)
(Selangor) Serdang BC	9 (166)

7th & 8th
(Kuala Lumpur) Kepong BC	6
(Selangor) Serdang BC	2

== Finals stage ==
Quarterfinals
(Selangor) Puchong United BC	11
(Selangor) Ampang Jaya BC	5
(Selangor) Petaling BC	11
(Selangor) Petaling Jaya BC	12

Semifinals
(Johor) Muar BC	4
(Selangor) Puchong United BC	11
(Selangor) BU Dragons BC	12 (216)
(Selangor) Petaling Jaya BC	12 (221)
5th & 6th
(Selangor) Ampang Jaya BC	4
(Selangor) Petaling BC	10

Finals
(Selangor) Puchong United BC	9
(Selangor) Petaling Jaya BC	13
3rd & 4th
(Johor) Muar BC	11
(Selangor) BU Dragons BC	6

2016-17 Purple League champions

First title

== Final standings ==
Pos	Club
1st place, gold medalist(s)	(Selangor) Petaling Jaya BC
2nd place, silver medalist(s)	(Selangor) Puchong United BC
3rd place, bronze medalist(s)	(Johor) Muar BC
4	(Selangor) BU Dragons BC
5	(Selangor) Petaling BC
6	(Selangor) Ampang Jaya BC
7	(Kuala Lumpur) Kepong BC
8	(Selangor) Serdang BC
9	(Kuala Lumpur) Bangsar Hawks BC
10	(Selangor) Klang City BC
