= 2018–19 Malaysia Purple League =

Tournament details
- Dates: 21 Dec 2018 – 27 Jan 2019
- Edition: 5
- Competitors: Ampang Jaya BC; Bandar Maharani BC; Bukit Mertajam All Stars; Kepong BC; Petaling BC; Puchong United BC; Serdang BC; Tebrau City BC
- Venue: Gem In Mall, Cyberjaya (group stages); Arena of Stars, Genting Highlands (grand finals)
- Location: Malaysia
- Official website: purpleleague.com

Results
- Champions: (Selangor) Puchong United BC (2nd title)
- Runners-up: (Kuala Lumpur) Kepong BC

2018–19 Malaysia Purple League (also known as SS Purple League for sponsorship reasons) is the fifth edition of Malaysia Purple League. It started on 21 December 2018 and will conclude on 27 January 2019. It will consist of 28 league ties (each tie consisting of 5 matches) in Stage 1. Top two teams in Stage 1, progressed to the finals stage. Meanwhile, the rest to the Stage 2 (divided into 2 groups) to accumulates points to contest four remaining spots for finals stage. Finals stage will features six teams.

== Squads ==
Ampang Jaya BC	Bandar Maharani BC	Bukit Mertajam All Stars	Kepong BC
(France) Brice Leverdez	(Thailand) Chasinee Korepap	(Indonesia) Abdul Kadir Zailani	(Malaysia) Ai Wei Jian
(Malaysia) Chan Peng Soon	(Malaysia) Goh Sze Fei	(Indonesia) Agripina Prima Rahmanto	(Malaysia) Ai Wei Jun
(Hong Kong) Chau Hoi Wah	(Malaysia) Lee Meng Yean	(Malaysia) Cheerandeev Arutchelvan	(Hong Kong) Chang Tak Ching
(Malaysia) Chooi Kah Ming	(Malaysia) Lee Zhi Qing	(Malaysia) Chua Yue Chern	(Malaysia) Cheah Yee See
(Indonesia) Ghaida Nurul Ghaniyu	(Malaysia) Lim Chong King	(China) Jin Yujia	(Malaysia) Anna Cheong
(Malaysia) Goh Jin Wei	(Malaysia) Mohd Razlan Shah	(Malaysia) Kong Yi Jin	(Malaysia) Chew Yi Xin
(Indonesia) Hanna Ramadini	(Malaysia) Ng Jun Yan	(Malaysia) Lim Jing Ning	(Malaysia) Goh Zhong Rui
(Chinese Taipei) Hsueh Hsuan-yi	(Malaysia) Nur Izzuddin	(Malaysia) Lim Ming Hui	(Malaysia) Lim Chi Wing
(Japan) Kento Momota	(Malaysia) Ooi Jhy Dar	(Malaysia) Lim Peiy Zhean	(Malaysia) Lin Jhih Yun
(Indonesia) Krishna Adi Nugraha	(Malaysia) Soo Teck Zhi	(France) Lucas Corvée	(Malaysia) Liu Wei Chen
(Malaysia) Kisona Selvaduray	(Thailand) Suphaphich Silprakob	(Malaysia) Lye Jun Cheng	(Chinese Taipei) Lu Ching-yao
(Malaysia) Lee Zii Jia	(Malaysia) Teh Jia Heng	(Malaysia) Menooshen Sivarao	(Malaysia) Mohamad Arif Abdul Latif
(Malaysia) Lim Tze Jian	(Malaysia) Tew Jia Jia	(Indonesia) Riyanto Subagja	(Malaysia) Muhd Nuraidil Ahda
(Malaysia) Low Juan Shen	(Malaysia) Wong Tien Ci	(Malaysia) Roobenraj Velayutham	(Hong Kong) Ng Wing Yung
(Indonesia) Lukhi Apri Nugroho	(Malaysia) Yap Roy King	(Japan) Shiori Saito	(Malaysia) Ng Yong Chai
(Indonesia) Masita Mahmudin	(Malaysia) Yap Rui Chen	(Malaysia) Sim Fong Hau	(Malaysia) Nur Mohd Azriyn Ayub
(Malaysia) Ng Wan Win	(Malaysia) Yap Yee	(Thailand) Supakorn Piyawaraporn	(China) Qin Jinjing
(Malaysia) Shevon Jemie Lai	(Malaysia) Yap Zhen	(Myanmar) Thet Htar Thuzar	(Malaysia) Soong Joo Ven
(Malaysia) Tan Jia Wei		(Thailand) Thiti Kokilawathee	(India) Subhankar Dey
(Malaysia) Tan Kok Xian		(Indonesia) Tiara Rosalia Nuraidah	(Malaysia) Tee Kai Wun
(Malaysia) Tan Ming Kang		(Indonesia) Wahyu Nayaka	(China) Wu Qianqian
(Malaysia) Wong Kha Yan			(China) Yan Runze
			(Chinese Taipei) Yang Po-han
			(Hong Kong) Yeung Sum Yee
Petaling BC	Puchong United BC	Serdang BC	Tebrau City BC
(Malaysia) Aaron Chia	(Malaysia) Adam Lau Yu Ming	(Malaysia) Choo Kai Qing	(Thailand) Boonsak Ponsana
(Malaysia) Cheam June Wei	(Malaysia) Alfred Lau Yu Leong	(China) Guo Yuchen	(Chinese Taipei) Chen Hsiao-huan
(Malaysia) Chen Tang Jie	(Hong Kong) Deng Xuan	(Malaysia) Han Zhen	(Malaysia) Chong Chun Ling
(Malaysia) Chong Yee Han	(Malaysia) Eoon Qi Xuan	(Chinese Taipei) Hu Ling-fang	(Malaysia) Choong Hon Jian
(Singapore) Danny Bawa Chrisnanta	(Malaysia) Goh Giap Chin	(Chinese Taipei) Lee Chia-hao	(Indonesia) Fikri Ihsandi Hadmadi
(Indonesia) Gabriela Meilani Moningka	(Malaysia) Goh Liu Ying	(Malaysia) Leong Jun Hao	(Thailand) Korakrit Laotrakul
(Malaysia) Goh V Shem	(Malaysia) Ho Yen Mei	(Malaysia) Lim Jee Lynn	(Malaysia) Lee Jian Yi
(Australia) Gronya Somerville	(South Korea) Hong Ji-hoon	(China) Liu Lin	(Malaysia) Lee Ying Ying
(Malaysia) Iskandar Zulkarnain Zainuddin	(Hong Kong) Lee Cheuk Yiu	(China) Liu Zejia	(Malaysia) Lim Zhen Ting
(Japan) Kenichi Tago	(Malaysia) Lee Yan Sheng	(Malaysia) Lwi Sheng Hao	(Malaysia) Low Hang Yee
(Malaysia) Lai Pei Jing	(Malaysia) Liew Daren	(Indonesia) Lyanny Alessandra Mainaky	(Chinese Taipei) Lu Chia-hung
(Malaysia) Lim Peiy Yee	(Malaysia) Lim Khim Wah	(Malaysia) Muhd Shaqeem Eiman	(Malaysia) Ng Eng Cheong
(Malaysia) Lim Yin Fun	(Malaysia) Lin Woon Fui	(Malaysia) Ng Tze Yong	(Malaysia) Pearly Tan Koong Le
(Malaysia) Man Wei Chong	(Hong Kong) Mak Hee Chun	(Malaysia) Ong Wei Khoon	(Thailand) Peerapat Boontun
(Malaysia) Peck Yen Wei	(Malaysia) Ng Qi Xuan	(China) Ou Xuanyi	(Indonesia) Rusydina Antardayu Riodingin
(Thailand) Sarita Suwannakitborihan	(Hong Kong) Ng Tsz Yau	(China) Pei Tianyi	(Malaysia) Satheishtharan Ramachandran
(Indonesia) Shella Devi Aulia	(Malaysia) Ong Yew Sin	(India) Pranav Chopra	(Malaysia) Soong Fie Cho
(Malaysia) Shia Chun Kang	(Malaysia) Tan Boon Heong	(Malaysia) Teh Ziyi	(Hong Kong) Tam Chun Hei
(Malaysia) Soh Wooi Yik	(Malaysia) Tan Kian Meng	(China) Wang Yihui	(Malaysia) Tan Jinn Hwa
(Singapore) Tan Wei Han	(Hong Kong) Tang Chun Man	(China) Wei Yawen	(Malaysia) Tan Wee Gieen
(Singapore) Terry Hee Yong Kai	(Malaysia) Teo Ee Yi	(Malaysia) Yap Cheng Wen	(China) Xu Wei
(Malaysia) Wong Jian Sern	(South Korea) Yoo Yeon-seong	(Malaysia) Yap Qar Siong	(China) Ye Binghong
(Indonesia) Yulia Yosephin Susanto		(Malaysia) Yeoh Chun Xian	(Malaysia) Yeoh Seng Zoe
		(Hong Kong) Yuen Sin Ying	(Hong Kong) Yonny Chung

== Stage 1 ==
=== Standings ===
Clubs	Pld	W	D	L	GF	GA	PF	PA	Pts	Qualification
(Selangor) Ampang Jaya BC	7	7	0	0	81	47	1213	1048	81	Finals stage
(Selangor) Puchong United BC	7	5	1	1	81	55	1268	1139	81	Finals stage
(Selangor) Petaling BC	7	3	1	3	80	57	1267	1122	80	Stage 2
(Kuala Lumpur) Kepong BC	7	5	0	2	79	58	1245	1115	79	Stage 2
(Johor) Tebrau City BC	7	2	0	5	64	74	1168	1228	64	Stage 2
(Selangor) Serdang BC	7	3	0	4	54	83	1099	1280	54	Stage 2
(Penang) Bukit Mertajam All Stars	7	2	0	5	51	74	1045	1147	51	Stage 2
(Johor) Bandar Maharani BC	7	0	0	7	47	89	1084	1310	47	Stage 2

=== Fixtures ===
==== Round-robin ====
Date	Team 1	Result	Team 2
21 Dec	Petaling BC	9 – 10	Ampang Jaya BC
22 Dec	Bukit Mertajam All Stars	10 – 8	Bandar Maharani BC
22 Dec	Puchong United BC	13 – 8	Tebrau City BC
22 Dec	Kepong BC	15 – 6	Serdang BC
23 Dec	Puchong United BC	15 – 5	Bukit Mertajam All Stars
23 Dec	Petaling BC	15 – 4	Bandar Maharani BC
24 Dec	Serdang BC	12 – 11	Tebrau City BC
24 Dec	Kepong BC	9 – 11	Ampang Jaya BC
26 Dec	Petaling BC	8 – 10	Kepong BC
26 Dec	Puchong United BC	6 – 9	Ampang Jaya BC
27 Dec	Bukit Mertajam All Stars	12 – 5	Serdang BC
27 Dec	Bandar Maharani BC	8 – 13	Tebrau City BC
28 Dec	Ampang Jaya BC	10 – 9	Tebrau City BC
28 Dec	Puchong United BC	11 – 8	Kepong BC
29 Dec	Bukit Mertajam All Stars	7 – 13	Petaling BC
29 Dec	Serdang BC	9 – 7	Bandar Maharani BC
30 Dec	Ampang Jaya BC	15 – 4	Bandar Maharani BC
30 Dec	Puchong United BC	13 – 7	Serdang BC
2 Jan	Petaling BC	15 – 4	Tebrau City BC
2 Jan	Bukit Mertajam All Stars	7 – 10	Kepong BC
3 Jan	Puchong United BC	13 – 8	Bandar Maharani BC
3 Jan	Bukit Mertajam All Stars	7 – 11	Ampang Jaya BC
4 Jan	Petaling BC	10 – 12	Serdang BC
4 Jan	Kepong BC	13 – 7	Tebrau City BC
5 Jan	Serdang BC	3 – 15	Ampang Jaya BC
5 Jan	Bukit Mertajam All Stars	3 – 12	Tebrau City BC
6 Jan	Kepong BC	14 – 8	Bandar Maharani BC
6 Jan	Puchong United BC	10 – 10	Petaling BC

== Stage 2 ==
=== Overall standings ===
Clubs	Pld	W	D	L	GF	GA	PF	PA	Pts	Qualification
(Selangor) Petaling BC	9	5	1	3	105	70	1602	1427	105	Finals stage
(Kuala Lumpur) Kepong BC	9	6	0	3	94	78	1507	1429	94	Finals stage
(Johor) Tebrau City BC	9	4	0	5	91	84	1529	1516	91	Finals stage
(Selangor) Serdang BC	9	4	0	5	73	100	1423	1565	73	Finals stage
(Penang) Bukit Mertajam All Stars	9	2	0	7	63	98	1352	1475	63	
(Johor) Bandar Maharani BC	9	0	0	9	57	113	1331	1626	57	

=== Fixtures ===
Date	Team 1	Result	Team 2
11 Jan	Bandar Maharani BC	4 – 12	Serdang BC
11 Jan	Kepong BC	6 – 12	Tebrau City BC
12 Jan	Bukit Mertajam All Stars BC	4 – 15	Tebrau City BC
12 Jan	Petaling BC	12 – 6	Bandar Maharani BC
13 Jan	Kepong BC	9 – 8	Bukit Mertajam All Stars BC
13 Jan	Petaling BC	13 – 7	Serdang BC

== Finals stage ==
=== Players transfer ===
Teams	Players in	Players out
Ampang Jaya BC	(Thailand) Pornpawee Chochuwong	(Malaysia) Shevon Jemie Lai
Kepong BC	(Denmark) Mads Conrad Petersen (Indonesia) Rian Agung Saputro (Indonesia) Ricky Karanda Suwardi	(Malaysia) Ai Wei Jun (Malaysia) Chew Yi Xin (Malaysia) Goh Zhong Rui
Petaling BC	(Thailand) Bodin Isara (Malaysia) Chong Wei Feng (Denmark) Jan Ø. Jørgensen (Hong Kong) Yip Pui Yin	(Singapore) Danny Bawa Chrisnanta (Thailand) Sarita Suwannakitborihan (Indonesia) Shella Devi Aulia (Malaysia) Soh Wooi Yik (Indonesia) Yulia Yosephin Susanto
Puchong United BC	(South Korea) Eom Hye-won (South Korea) Kim Sa-rang (China) Lin Guipu	(South Korea) Hong Ji-hoon (Malaysia) Lee Yan Sheng
Serdang BC	—	—
Tebrau City BC	(Thailand) Adulrach Namkul	(Thailand) Korakrit Laotrakul

=== Bracket ===
Quarterfinals
4	(Kuala Lumpur) Kepong BC	10
6	(Selangor) Serdang BC	4
5	(Johor) Tebrau City BC	6
3	(Selangor) Petaling BC	11

Semifinals
1	(Selangor) Ampang Jaya BC	8
4	(Kuala Lumpur) Kepong BC	12
2	(Selangor) Puchong United BC	10
3	(Selangor) Petaling BC	7
5th & 6th
6	(Selangor) Serdang BC	2
5	(Johor) Tebrau City BC	9

Finals
4	(Kuala Lumpur) Kepong BC	6
2	(Selangor) Puchong United BC	10
3rd & 4th
1	(Selangor) Ampang Jaya BC	7
3	(Selangor) Petaling BC	11

2018-19 Purple League champions

Second title

== Final standings ==
Pos	Club
1st place, gold medalist(s)	(Selangor) Puchong United BC
2nd place, silver medalist(s)	(Kuala Lumpur) Kepong BC
3rd place, bronze medalist(s)	(Selangor) Petaling BC
4	(Selangor) Ampang Jaya BC
5	(Johor) Tebrau City BC
6	(Selangor) Serdang BC
7	(Penang) Bukit Mertajam All Stars
8	(Johor) Bandar Maharani BC
