= Tai An Khang =

Malaysian badminton player (born 1994)

Tai An Khang 戴安康
Personal information
- Born: 26 June 1994 (age 32) Batu Berendam, Malacca, Malaysia
- Height: 1.76 m (5 ft 9 in)
- Weight: 84 kg (185 lb)

Sport
- Country: Malaysia
- Sport: Badminton
- Handedness: Left

Men's doubles
- Highest ranking: 103 (30 October 2014)
- BWF profile
Medal record
Men's badminton
Representing Malaysia
World Junior Championships
Gold medal – first place	2011 Taipei	Mixed team
Asian Junior Championships
Bronze medal – third place	2012 Gimcheon	Mixed team

Tai An Khang
- Chinese: 戴安康
- Hanyu Pinyin: Dài Ānkāng
- Hokkien POJ: Tài An-khang

Tai An Khang (born 26 June 1994) is a Malaysian badminton player. The left handler Tai, started playing badminton at aged 7, and joined the Malaysia national badminton team in 2013. At the Malaysia Purple League he represented Serdang BC in 2014–15, Kepong BC in 2015–16, and Klang City BC in 2016–17 seasons. He won the men's doubles title at the 2012 Smiling Fish International and 2015 Iran Fajr International tournament with different partners.

He is currently a coach in Klang City Badminton Academy which is under the management of Klang City badminton club.

== Achievements ==
=== BWF International Challenge/Series (2 titles, 1 runner-up) ===
Men's doubles
Year	Tournament	Partner	Opponent	Score	Result
2012	Smiling Fish International	(Malaysia) Darren Isaac Devadass	(Thailand) Siriwat Matayanumati (Thailand) Pusanawat Saisirivit	14–21, 21–14, 24–22	(gold) Winner
2014	Bangladesh International	(Malaysia) Darren Isaac Devadass	(Malaysia) Low Juan Shen (Malaysia) Ong Yew Sin	21–19, 8–21, 13–21	(silver) Runner-up
2015	Iran Fajr International	(Malaysia) Yew Hong Kheng	(Philippines) Aries Delos Santos (Philippines) Alvin Morada	21–12, 18–21, 21–16	(gold) Winner

BWF International Challenge tournament
BWF International Series tournament
BWF Future Series tournament
