= Xu Wei (disambiguation) =

Xu Wei (1521–1593) was a Ming dynasty painter and writer.

Xu Wei is also the name of:

- Xu Wei (musician) (born 1968), Chinese rock musician
- Xu Wei (badminton) (born 1995), female Chinese badminton player
