= 2021–22 Malaysia Purple League =

Tournament details
- Dates: 1 Oct 2022 – 9 Oct 2022
- Edition: 6
- Competitors: Puchong United BC; Serdang BC; Petaling BC; Ampang Jaya BC; Candra Wijaya International; Sena Bangkok Club; Ho Chi Minh BC; Singapore Badminton Team
- Nations: Malaysia; Indonesia; Thailand; Vietnam; Singapore
- Venue: Malawati Stadium (group stage); Arena of Stars, Genting Highlands (grand finals)
- Location: Malaysia
- Official website: purpleleague.com

Results
- Champions: (Selangor) Ampang Jaya BC (1st title)
- Runners-up: (Selangor) Petaling BC
- Semi-finalists: (Thailand) Sena Bangkok Club (Selangor) Puchong United BC

2021–22 Malaysia Purple League (also known as SENHENG redONE Purple League for sponsorship reasons) was the sixth edition of Malaysia Purple League offering a total prize of RM500,000 (US$110,000). It started on 1 October 2022 and will conclude on 9 October 2022. It will consist of 28 league ties (each tie consisting of 5 matches) in Stage 1. Top two teams in Stage 1, progressed to the knockout stage. Meanwhile the rest to the Stage 1 (divided into 2 groups) to accumulates points to contest four remaining spots for finals stage.

In this edition of the league, clubs from Indonesia, Thailand, Vietnam and Singapore would make their first ever appearance in the league.

== Squads ==
Ampang Jaya BC	Candra Wijaya International BC	Ho Chi Minh BC	Sena Bangkok Club
(Malaysia) Chong Ee Jack	(Indonesia) Alif Faj Dary	(Vietnam) Nguyễn Tiến Minh	(Thailand) Kachain Buarung
(Chinese Taipei) Chou Tien-chen	(Indonesia) Enzi Shafira	(Vietnam) Vũ Thị Trang	(Thailand) Atitaya Povanon
(Malaysia) Goh Soon Huat	(Indonesia) Metya Inayah Cindiani	(Vietnam) Vũ Thị Anh Thư	(Thailand) Busanan Ongbamrungphan
(Malaysia) Shevon Jemie Lai	(Indonesia) Natalie Ivyana	(Vietnam) Bảo Minh	(Thailand) Peeraya Munkitamorn
(Malaysia) Lau Yi Sheng	(Indonesia) Ruselli Hartawan	(Vietnam) Bùi Thành Đạt	(Thailand) Kittipong Imnark
(Malaysia) Goh Jin Wei	(Indonesia) Serena Kani	(Vietnam) Nguyễn Ảnh Gia Huy	(Thailand) Kittisak Namdash
(South Korea) Lee Dong-keun	(Indonesia) Gabriel Wijaya	(Vietnam) Nguyễn Đức Hồng Phúc	(Thailand) Pongsakorn Thongkham
(Malaysia) Erica Hoh	(Indonesia) Galuh Dwi Putra	(Vietnam) Nguyễn Hải Đăng	(Thailand) Prinyawat Thongnuam
(Malaysia) Tang Wen Xin	(Indonesia) Hafiz Faizal	(Vietnam) Phan Phúc Thịnh	(Malaysia) Tan Wee Kiong
(Malaysia) Ling Wei Jie	(Indonesia) Krishna Adi Nugraha	(Vietnam) Trần Nguyễn Chi Tùng	(Malaysia) Yap Qar Siong
(Malaysia) Lee Yi Bo	(Indonesia) Michael Kaldrian	(Vietnam) Lê Ngọc Vân	
(Indonesia) Muhd. Reza Pahlevi Isfahani	(Indonesia) Panji Ahmad Maulana	(Vietnam) Lâm Mỹ Tiên	
(Indonesia) Sabar Karyaman Gutama	(Indonesia) Ricky Karanda Suwardi		
(Malaysia) Nur Mohd Azriyn Ayub	(Indonesia) Tommy Sugiarto		
(Malaysia) Tan Jia Jie	(Indonesia) Yordan Gunawan		
(Malaysia) Tan Ming Kang			
Petaling BC	Puchong United BC	Serdang BC	Singapore Badminton Team
(France) Brice Leverdez	(Malaysia) Goh Giap Chin	(Malaysia) Choo Kai Qing	(Singapore) Donovan Willard Wee
(Malaysia) Cheam June Wei	(Malaysia) Goh Liu Ying	(Malaysia) Boon Xin Yuan	(Singapore) Terry Hee
(Malaysia) Chen Tang Jie	(Hong Kong) Lee Cheuk Yiu	(Malaysia) Wong Tien Ci	(Singapore) Ho Lo Ee
(Malaysia) Cheah Liek Hou	(Malaysia) Lim Chi Wing	(Malaysia) Lim Hong Xuan	(Singapore) Loh Kean Hean
(Malaysia) Goh V Shem	(Malaysia) Ho Yen Mei	(Malaysia) Lim Hong Zhe	(Singapore) Joel Koh Jia Wei
(Malaysia) Jimmy Wong	(Malaysia) Ng Qi Xuan	(Malaysia) Lim Hong Zhe	(Singapore) Johann Prajogo
(Malaysia) Low Juan Shen	(Malaysia) Soniia Cheah Su Ya	(Chinese Taipei) Lin Kuan-ting	(Singapore) Megan Lee Xinyi
(Malaysia) Muhammad Ariffin	(Malaysia) Lim Khim Wah	(Malaysia) Micaiah Chai	(Singapore) Nur Insyirah Khan
(Chinese Taipei) Pai Yu-po	(Malaysia) Ong Yew Sin	(Malaysia) Mohd Iskandar Zulkarnain Mohd Danelly	(Singapore) Alexis Lee Ying Shin
(Malaysia) Lai Pei Jing	(Malaysia) Tan Kian Meng	(Malaysia) Muhammad Nuraidil Adha	(Singapore) Lim Ming Hong
(Malaysia) Tan Zhing Yi	(Malaysia) Teo Ee Yi	(Malaysia) Tan Yi Han	(Singapore) Marcus Phil Lau Jun Hui
(Malaysia) Yap Ling		(Malaysia) Too Ming Yap	(Singapore) Nge Joo Jie
(Malaysia) Yap Yee		(Myanmar) Thet Htar Thuzar	
(Malaysia) Ng Eng Cheong		(Chinese Taipei) Yang Yang	
(Malaysia) Tan Kok Xian			
(Malaysia) Tan Boon Heong			

== Group stage ==
=== Group A ===
Clubs	Pld	W	D	L	GD	Pts	Qualification
(Selangor) Petaling BC (Q)	3	3	0	0	+18	39	Advance to semi-finals
(Selangor) Ampang Jaya BC (Q)	3	2	0	1	+14	35	Advance to semi-finals
(Indonesia) Candra Wijaya International BC (E)	3	1	0	2	0	30	
Singapore Badminton Team (E)	3	0	0	3	-32	11	

1 October	Petaling BC (Selangor)	10–8	(Selangor) Ampang Jaya BC

Cheah Liek Hou	3–0	Tan Jia Jie	11-8, 11-5, 11-9
Pai Yu-po	3–0	Erica Hoh	11-8, 11-5, 11-2
Goh V Shem / Low Juan Shen	3–2	Nur Mohd Azriyn Ayub / Lau Yi Sheng	7-11, 9-11, 11-7, 11-8, 11-5
Tan Kok Xian / Lai Pei Jing	0–3	Goh Soon Huat / Shevon Jemie Lai	6-11, 3-11, 3-11
Brice Leverdez	1–3	Chou Tien-chen	11-7, 10-11, 10-11, 7-11

2 October	Candra Wijaya International BC (Indonesia)	15–2	Singapore Badminton Team

Krishna Adi Nugraha	3–0	Marcus Phil Lau	11-5, 11-1, 11-7
Ruselli Hartawan	3–2	Megan Lee	11-5, 7-11, 11-8, 4-11, 11-6
Gabriel Wijaya / Galuh Dwi Putra	3–0	Johann Prajogo / Nge Joo Jie	11-5, 11-10, 11-9
Hafiz Faizal / Serena Kani	3–0	Donovan Willard Wee / Ho Lo Ee	11-3, 11-4, 11-4
Tommy Sugiarto	3–0	Lim Ming Hong	11-4, 11-8, 11-2

3 October	Singapore Badminton Team	3–15	(Selangor) Petaling BC

Marcus Phil Lau	0–3	Cheah Liek Hou	9-11, 9-11, 9-11
Megan Lee	1–3	Pai Yu-po	8-11, 11-10, 8-11, 10-11
Donovan Willard Wee / Loh Kean Hean	0–3	Goh V Shem / Low Juan Shen	7-11, 9-11, 7-11
Johann Prajogo / Ho Lo Ee	0–3	Ng Eng Cheong / Lai Pei Jing	7-11, 9-11, 4-11
Lim Ming Hong	2–3	Brice Leverdez	11-9, 11-7, 10-11, 6-11, 5-10

3 October	Ampang Jaya BC (Selangor)	14–5	(Indonesia) Candra Wijaya International BC

Tan Jia Jie	2–3	Panji Ahmad Maulana	11-9, 11-8, 6-11, 4-11, 9-11
Goh Jin Wei	3–1	Ruselli Hartawan	8-11, 11-9, 11-7, 11-7
Moh Reza Pahlevi Isfahani / Sabar Karyaman Gutama	3–0	Gabriel Wijaya / Ricky Karanda Suwardi	11-8, 11-5, 11-8
Goh Soon Huat / Shevon Jemie Lai	3–1	Hafiz Faizal / Serena Kani	11-9, 11-8, 10-11, 11-5
Chou Tien-chen	3–0	Tommy Sugiarto	11-5, 11-4, 11-8

5 October	Ampang Jaya BC (Selangor)	13–6	Singapore Badminton Team

Tan Jia Jie	1–3	Marcus Phil Lau	11-8, 5-11, 9-11, 10-11
Goh Jin Wei	3–1	Megan Lee	9-11, 11-3, 9-11, 11-4, 11-2
Moh Reza Pahlevi Isfahani / Sabar Karyaman Gutama	3–1	Terry Hee / Loh Kean Hean	11-6, 9-11, 11-8, 11-7
Goh Soon Huat / Shevon Jemie Lai	3–0	Donovan Willard Wee / Ho Lo Ee	11-9, 11-6, 11-5
Chou Tien-chen	3–0	Lim Ming Hong	11-8, 11-9, 11-3

5 October	Petaling BC (Selangor)	14–5	(Indonesia) Candra Wijaya International BC

Cheam June Wei	3–2	Enzi Shafira	11-9 10-11 11-6 6-11 7-2^{gs}
Pai Yu-po	2–3	Ruselli Hartawan	11-9, 9-11, 11-9, 7-11, 4-6^{gs}
Goh V Shem / Low Juan Shen	3–1	Gabriel Wijaya / Galuh Dwi Putra	11-6, 10-11, 11-2, 11-8
Ng Eng Cheong / Lai Pei Jing	3–2	Hafiz Faizal / Serena Kani	7-11, 11-7, 6-11, 11-10, 9-8^{gs}
Brice Leverdez	3–2	Tommy Sugiarto	11-8, 9-11, 11-5, 6-11, 9-8^{gs}

=== Group B ===
Clubs	Pld	W	D	L	GD	Pts	Qualification
(Selangor) Puchong United BC (Q)	3	3	0	0	+25	41	Advance to semi-finals
(Thailand) Sena Bangkok Club (Q)	3	2	0	1	+4	33	Advance to semi-finals
(Vietnam) Ho Chi Minh BC (E)	3	1	0	2	-11	23	
(Selangor) Serdang BC (E)	3	0	0	3	-18	20	

1 October	Puchong United BC (Selangor)	14–6	(Selangor) Serdang BC

Lim Chi Wing	3–1	Too Ming Yap	10-11, 11-8, 11-2, 11-8
Soniia Cheah	2–3	Thet Htar Thuzar	9-11, 11-8, 10-11, 11-3, 6-11
Ong Yew Sin / Teo Ee Yi	3–1	Boon Xin Yuan / Wong Tien Ci	11-7, 11-3, 5-11, 11-6
Tan Kian Meng / Goh Liu Ying	3–1	Muhammad Nuraidil Adha Azman / Lim Chiew Sien	6-11, 11-6, 11-8, 11-9
Liew Daren	3–1	Choo Kai Qing	11-2, 11-3, 11-5

2 October	Sena Bangkok Club (Thailand)	13–9	(Vietnam) Ho Chi Minh BC

Kachain Buarung	2–3	Nguyễn Hải Đăng	11-8, 10-11, 11-4, 2-11, 2-11
Busanan Ongbamrungphan	3–2	Vũ Thị Anh Thư	11-7, 11-2, 8-11, 6-11, 2-1
Kittisak Namdash / Pongsakorn Thongkham	3–0	Nguyễn Đức Hồng Phúc / Trần Nguyễn Chi Tùng	11-3, 11-9, 11-7
Yap Qar Siong / Atitaya Povanon	3–1	Nguyễn Ảnh Gia Huy / Lâm Mỹ Tiên	10-11, 11-6, 11-9, 11-3
Kittipong Imnark	2–3	Nguyễn Tiến Minh	2-11, 11-8, 7-11, 11-6, 8-11

4 October	Ho Chi Minh BC (Vietnam)	5–13	(Selangor) Puchong United BC

Phan Phúc Thịnh	1–3	Lim Chi Wing	4-11, 11-8, 4-11, 7-11
Vũ Thị Trang	3–1	Soniia Cheah	11-8, 8-11, 11-4, 11-9
Nguyễn Đức Hồng Phúc / Trần Nguyễn Chi Tùng	0–3	Ong Yew Sin / Teo Ee Yi	3-11, 3-11, 3-11
Nguyễn Ảnh Gia Huy / Lâm Mỹ Tiên	1–3	Tan Kian Meng / Goh Liu Ying	11-10, 5-11, 6-11, 6-11
Nguyễn Hải Đăng	0–3	Liew Daren	9-11, 7-11, 5-11

4 October	Serdang BC (Selangor)	6–15	(Thailand) Sena Bangkok Club

Too Ming Yap	2–3	Kachain Buarung	10-11, 8-11, 11-2, 11-9, 6-7
Thet Htar Thuzar	0–3	Busanan Ongbamrungphan	5-11, 9-11, 8-11
Boon Xin Yuan / Wong Tien Ci	1–3	Kittisak Namdash / Tan Wee Kiong	5-11, 10-11, 11-9, 10-11
Muhammad Nuraidil Adha Azman / Lim Chiew Sien	2–3	Yap Qar Siong / Atitaya Povanon	9-11, 9-11, 11-7, 11-10, 9-11
Lin Kuan-ting	1–3	Kittipong Imnark	11-8, 8-11, 8-11, 7-11

6 October	Puchong United BC (Selangor)	14–5	(Thailand) Sena Bangkok Club

Lim Chi Wing	3–0	Kachain Buarung	11-5, 11-6, 11-4
Soniia Cheah	2–3	Busanan Ongbamrungphan	11-6, 4-11, 11-8, 8-11, 1-6
Ong Yew Sin / Teo Ee Yi	3–2	Kittisak Namdash / Tan Wee Kiong	9-11, 11-8, 11-6, 7-11, 11-6
Tan Kian Meng / Goh Liu Ying	3–0	Pongsakorn Thongkham / Peeraya Munkitamorn	11-8, 11-10, 11-10
Liew Daren	1–3	Kittipong Imnark	11-8, 11-5, 11-8

6 October	Serdang BC (Selangor)	8–9	(Vietnam) Ho Chi Minh BC

Mohamad Iskandar Zulkarnain Mohd Danelly	0–3	Phan Phúc Thịnh	4-11, 8-11, 4-11
Thet Htar Thuzar	1–3	Vũ Thị Anh Thư	7-11, 11-6, 8-11, 10-11
Boon Xin Yuan / Tan Yi Han	3–0	Nguyễn Đức Hồng Phúc / Trần Nguyễn Chi Tùng	11-4, 11-5, 11-10
Wong Tien Ci / Lim Chiew Sien	3–0	Nguyễn Ảnh Gia Huy / Lâm Mỹ Tiên	11-4, 11-5, 11-8
Lin Kuan-ting	1–3	Nguyễn Tiến Minh	8-11, 11-9, 6-11, 10-11

=== Fixtures ===
Date	Team 1	Result	Team 2
1 Oct	Puchong United BC	14 – 6	Serdang BC
1 Oct	Petaling BC	10 – 8	Ampang Jaya BC
2 Oct	Sena Bangkok Club	13 – 9	Ho Chi Minh BC
2 Oct	Candra Wijaya International BC	15 – 2	Singapore Badminton Team
3 Oct	Singapore Badminton Team	3 – 15	Petaling BC
3 Oct	Ampang Jaya BC	14 – 5	Candra Wijaya International BC
4 Oct	Ho Chi Minh BC	5 – 13	Puchong United BC
4 Oct	Serdang BC	6 – 15	Sena Bangkok Club
5 Oct	Ampang Jaya BC	13 – 6	Singapore Badminton Team
5 Oct	Petaling BC	14 – 10	Candra Wijaya International BC
6 Oct	Puchong United BC	14 – 5	Sena Bangkok Club
6 Oct	Serdang BC	8 – 9	Ho Chi Minh BC

== Finals stage ==
=== Bracket ===
Semi-finals
A1	(Selangor) Petaling BC	10
B1	(Thailand) Sena Bangkok Club	3
B2	(Selangor) Puchong United BC	5
A2	(Selangor) Ampang Jaya BC	9

Final
A1	(Selangor) Petaling BC	2
A2	(Selangor) Ampang Jaya BC	9
3rd & 4th
B1	(Thailand) Sena Bangkok Club	5
B2	(Selangor) Puchong United BC	10

==== Semi-finals ====
8 October	Petaling BC (Selangor)	10–3	(Thailand) Sena Bangkok Club

Brice Leverdez	3–0	Kittipong Imnark	11-4, 11-7, 11-8
Pai Yu-po	1–3	Busanan Ongbamrungphan	6-11, 9-11, 11-8, 5-11
Goh V Shem / Low Juan Shen	3–0	Kittisak Namdash / Tan Wee Kiong	11-8, 11-6, 11-4
Chen Tang Jie / Lai Pei Jing	3–0	Yap Qar Siong / Atitaya Povanon	11-4, 11-6, 11-4
Cheam June Wei		Kachain Buarung	not played

8 October	Ampang Jaya BC (Selangor)	9–5	(Selangor) Puchong United BC

Chou Tien-chen	0–3	Lee Cheuk Yiu	7-11, 2-11, 7-11
Goh Jin Wei	3–2	Soniia Cheah	11-6, 5-11, 3-11, 11-7, 11-9
Moh Reza Pahlevi Isfahani / Sabar Karyaman Gutama	3–0	Ong Yew Sin / Teo Ee Yi	11-9, 11-4, 11-7
Goh Soon Huat / Shevon Jemie Lai	3–0	Tan Kian Meng / Goh Liu Ying	11-10, 11-6, 11-6
Tan Jia Jie		Liew Daren	not played

==== 3rd & 4th placing ====
9 October	Sena Bangkok Club (Thailand)	5–10	(Selangor) Puchong United BC

Kittipong Imnark	1–3	Lee Cheuk Yiu	6-11, 7-11, 11-6, 5-11
Busanan Ongbamrungphan	3–1	Ho Yen Mei	11-7, 11-2, 8-11, 11-9
Kittisak Namdash / Pongsakorn Thongkham	0–3	Ong Yew Sin / Teo Ee Yi	5-11, 5-11, 4-11
Pongsakorn Thongkham / Atitaya Povanon	1–3	Tan Kian Meng / Goh Liu Ying	6-11, 8-11, 11-6, 8-11
Kachain Buarung		Liew Daren	not played

==== Final ====
9 October	Petaling BC (Selangor)	2–9	(Selangor) Ampang Jaya BC

Brice Leverdez	1–3	Chou Tien-chen	10-11, 5-11, 11-9, 6-11
Pai Yu-po	1–3	Goh Jin Wei	9-11, 6-11, 11-10, 9-11
Goh V Shem / Low Juan Shen	0–3	Moh Reza Pahlevi Isfahani / Sabar Karyaman Gutama	9-11, 4-11, 6-11
Chen Tang Jie / Lai Pei Jing		Goh Soon Huat / Shevon Jemie Lai	not played
Cheah Liek Hou		Tan Jia Jie	not played

2021-22 Purple League champions

First title

== Final standings ==
Pos	Club	Pld	W	D	L	GD	Final result
1st place, gold medalist(s)	(Selangor) Ampang Jaya BC	5	4	0	1	+21	Champions
2nd place, silver medalist(s)	(Selangor) Petaling BC	5	4	0	2	+11	Runners-up
3rd place, bronze medalist(s)	(Selangor) Puchong United BC	5	4	0	1	+30	Eliminated in semi-finals
4	(Thailand) Sena Bangkok Club	5	3	0	3	-1	Eliminated in semi-finals
5	(Indonesia) Candra Wijaya International BC	3	1	0	2	0	Eliminated in group stage
6	(Vietnam) Ho Chi Minh BC	3	1	0	2	-11	Eliminated in group stage
7	(Selangor) Serdang BC	3	0	0	3	-18	Eliminated in group stage
8	Singapore Badminton Team	3	0	0	3	-32	Eliminated in group stage

== Broadcasters ==
Country/ Region	Broadcaster	Ref(s)
Hong Kong; Indonesia; Macau; Mongolia; Philippines; Singapore; Thailand	SPOTV	
Malaysia	Astro Arena	
