= Badminton at the 2015 SEA Games – Women's team =

Badminton championships

Women's badminton team at the 2015 SEA Games
- Venue: Singapore Indoor Stadium
- Dates: 10–12 June 2015
- Competitors: 45 from 5 nations

Medalists
gold medal	Thailand (THA)
silver medal	Malaysia (MAS)
bronze medal	Singapore (SIN)
bronze medal	Indonesia (INA)

The badminton women's team tournament at the 2015 SEA Games in Singapore was held from 10 June to 12 June at the Singapore Indoor Stadium.

== Schedule ==
All times are Singapore Standard Time (UTC+08:00)

Date	Time	Event
Wednesday, 10 June	12:00	Quarter-final
Thursday, 11 June	12:00	Semi-final
Friday, 12 June	12:00	Final

== Results ==
Quarter-final
Vietnam (VIE)	2
Malaysia (MAS)	3

Semi-Final
Thailand (THA)	3
Singapore (SIN)	0
Malaysia (MAS)	3
Indonesia (INA)	1

Final
Thailand (THA)	3
Malaysia (MAS)	0

=== Quarter-final ===
10 June; 12:00	Vietnam (VIE)	2–3	Malaysia (MAS)

Vũ Thị Trang	2–0	Lim Yin Fun	21–17, 21–16
Nguyễn Thị Sen	2–1	Ho Yen Mei	21–17, 16–21, 21–17
Thái Thị Hồng Gấm / Phạm Như Thảo	0–2	Amelia Alicia Anscelly / Soong Fie Cho	8–21, 10–21
Nguyễn Thùy Linh	1–2	Goh Jin Wei	19–21, 21–18, 11–21
Vũ Thị Trang / Nguyễn Thị Sen	0–2	Vivian Hoo / Woon Khe Wei	14–21, 14–21

=== Semi-final ===
11 June; 12:00	Thailand (THA)	3–0	Singapore (SIN)

Ratchanok Intanon	2–0	Liang Xiaoyu	21–17, 21–14
Sapsiree Taerattanachai / Puttita Supajirakul	2–0	Vanessa Neo / Shinta Mulia Sari	21–12, 21–17
Busanan Ongbamrungphan	2–0	Grace Chua	21–6, 21–15

11 June; 12:10	Malaysia (MAS)	3–1	Indonesia (INA)

Tee Jing Yi	0–2	Lindaweni Fanetri	12–21, 10–21
Vivian Hoo / Woon Khe Wei	2–1	Anggia Shitta Awanda / Ni Ketut Mahadewi Istarani	21–18, 19–21, 21–6
Ho Yen Mei	2–1	Hanna Ramadini	21–19, 11–21, 21–19
Amelia Alicia Anscelly / Soong Fie Cho	2–1	Suci Rizky Andini / Maretha Dea Giovani	15–21, 21–19, 21–13

=== Final ===
12 June; 12:00	Thailand (THA)	3–0	Malaysia (MAS)

Ratchanok Intanon	2–0	Lim Yin Fun	21–13, 21–14
Puttita Supajirakul / Sapsiree Taerattanachai	2–0	Amelia Alicia Anscelly / Soong Fie Cho	22–20, 21–18
Busanan Ongbamrungphan	2–0	Ho Yen Mei	21–8, 21–15
