= 2014–15 Malaysia Purple League =

Tournament details
- Dates: 25 November 2015 – 1 February 2016
- Administrator(s): Purple League (M) Sdn. Bhd
- Format(s): Round-robin
- Host(s): Malaysia
- Teams: 12

Final positions
- Champions: (Johor) Muar City BC (1st title)
- Runner-up: (Selangor) Petaling Jaya BC
- Third Place: (Selangor) Puchong United BC

Tournament summary
- Matches played: 11

2014–15 Purple League was the Malaysia Purple League's first season. The Malaysia Purple League is a badminton league managed by Purple League (M) Sdn. Bhd. The Purple League is also known as the Kopiko Purple League for sponsorship reasons.

The League's inaugural season began on 25 November 2014 and ended on 1 February 2015. Twelve teams participated in the league. The first leg ended on 2 January 2014 with Puchong United BC (Badminton Club) leading the table, and the season ended with Muar City BC becoming the first Malaysia Purple League Champion. Several Olympic gold medal winners, world champions, and former stars also participated in the inaugural season.

The team with the highest point score at the end of the season was awarded RM1,000,000 in prize money (about $237,000 in 2015 U.S. dollars). The second-place team received RM300,000, and the third place team received RM150,000. The fourth through tenth place teams each received RM80,000.

== Format ==
The format differed from the usual for badminton tournaments. The 12 teams in the League played a round-robin competition using the best of five games format with 11 points per game. A tie would be decided by two men's singles, two men's doubles, one woman's singles, and one mixed doubles.

=== Player Registration ===
Each club could register up to 20 players, but they were only allowed to engage two players in the top 32 bracket. This was to ensure that the richer clubs did not have a monopoly on the best players. The clubs were also allowed to have foreign players on their teams, with the condition that these players should not constitute more than 30% of the team.

== Teams ==
| Team | City | Joined | Coach | Manager |
|---|---|---|---|---|
| Ampang Jaya BC | Ampang, Selangor | 2014 | (Malaysia) Kuan Kam Chung | (Malaysia) Ho Khek Mong |
| Bangsar Hawks BC | Bangsar, Selangor | 2014 | (Malaysia) M. Jivanathan Nair | (Malaysia) Visvalingam Dorairaju |
| Cheras BC | Cheras, Kuala Lumpur | 2014 | (Malaysia) Chor Hooi Yee | (Malaysia) Raezal Hussein |
| Kajang BC | Kajang, Selangor | 2014 | (Indonesia) Lukman Hakim | (Malaysia) Yeoh Kay Lun |
| Kepong BC | Kepong, Kuala Lumpur | 2014 | (Malaysia) Wong Tat Meng | (Malaysia) Candy Bee |
| Klang United BC | Klang, Selangor | 2014 | (Malaysia) Yap Kim Hock^1 | (Malaysia) Yap Kim Hock^1 |
| Muar City BC | Muar, Johor | 2014 | (Indonesia) Nova Widianto | (Malaysia) Jabbery Lim |
| Nusajaya BC | Nusajaya, Johor | 2014 | (Malaysia) Haw Chiou Hwee | (Malaysia) Ooi Sock Ai |
| Petaling BC | Petaling, Selangor | 2014 | (Indonesia) Rommy Arnold | (Malaysia) Datuk Vincent Wong |
| Petaling Jaya BC | Petaling Jaya, Selangor | 2014 | (China) Li Mao | (Malaysia) Manoj Kumar |
| Puchong United BC | Puchong, Selangor | 2014 | (Malaysia) Jeremy Gan | (Malaysia) Andy Lor Tim Cheung |
| Serdang BC | Seri Kembangan, Selangor | 2014 | (Malaysia) Koar Kay Lin | (Malaysia) Ong Ewe Hock |

Note:
^1Yap Kim Hock is both the coach and manager for Klang United BC

=== Owners ===
| Teams | Owner |
|---|---|
| Ampang Jaya BC | Ho Khek Mong |
| Bangsar Hawks BC | Nara Visvalingam & Jivananthan^1 |
| Cheras BC | Raezal Hussein & Chor Hooi Yee^1 |
| Kajang BC | |
| Kepong BC | Tan Boon Heong & Candy Bee^1 |
| Klang United BC | Yap Kim Hock |
| Muar City BC | Nova Armada & Anthony Lim^1 |
| Nusajaya BC | Ooi Sock Ai |
| Petaling BC | Looi Badminton Academy |
| Petaling Jaya BC | K. Yogendran, Yeoh Kay Bin & Manoj^1 |
| Puchong United BC | Andy Lor & Jeremy Gan^1 |
| Serdang BC | Ong Ewe Hock |

Note:
^1 - Co-Owned

=== Squads ===
A total of 12 clubs were chosen to compete in the league. Each squad has up to 20 players. Elite badminton players from all around the world also competed and represented different clubs.

| Muar City BC | | Petaling Jaya BC | | Kepong BC | | Serdang BC | |
| Country | Player | Country | Player | Country | Player | Country | Player |
|---|---|---|---|---|---|---|---|
| South Korea | Lee Hyun-il | Vietnam | Nguyễn Tiến Minh | Indonesia | Vita Marissa | Malaysia | Soong Joo Ven |
| Malaysia | Vivian Hoo | Thailand | Sudket Prapakamol | Malaysia | Chong Wei Feng | Malaysia | Goh Jin Wei |
| Malaysia | Tan Wee Kiong | Malaysia | Kong Keat Zhen | Malaysia | Tan Boon Heong | Malaysia | Amelia Alicia Anscelly |
| Scotland | Robert Blair | Malaysia | Jagdish Singh | Malaysia | Ai Wei Jian | Malaysia | Tan Kian Meng |
| Indonesia | Adriyanti Firdasari | Malaysia | Roni Tan Wee Long | Malaysia | Chin Chuan Jue | Malaysia | Tai An Khang |
| Malaysia | Tan Chun Seang | Malaysia | Anita Raj Kaur | Malaysia | Chua Khek Wei | Malaysia | Tan Yip Jiun |
| Malaysia | Mohamad Arif Abdul Latif | Malaysia | Chiang Jiann Shiarng | Malaysia | Goh Soon Huat | Malaysia | Tan Chee Tean |
| Indonesia | Rusydina Antardayu Riodingin | Thailand | Bodin Isara | Singapore | Liang Xiaoyu | Malaysia | Sannatasah Saniru |
| Indonesia | Fikri Ihsandi Hadmadi | Malaysia | Yogendran Krishnan | Malaysia | Lim Yin Loo | Malaysia | Lim Chi Wing |
| Malaysia | Tan Bin Shen | Malaysia | Woon Kok Hong | Malaysia | Low Juan Shen | Malaysia | Chian Chin Yong |
| Malaysia | Chow Pak Chuu | Malaysia | Vountus Indra Mawan | Malaysia | Ng Di Hua | Malaysia | Derek Yeoh |
| Malaysia | Mak Hee Chun | Malaysia | Loke Pok Wong | Malaysia | Nur Mohd.Azriyn Ayub | Malaysia | Lim Zhen Ting |
| Malaysia | Teo Kok Siang | England | Andrew Smith | Malaysia | Ong Jian Guo | Malaysia | Lee Jian Yi |
| Malaysia | Chow Mei Kuan | Indonesia | Milicent Wiranto | Malaysia | Ow Yao Han | Malaysia | Yap Cheng Wen |
| Malaysia | Au Kok Leong | Malaysia | Ahmadi Ahmad Saman | Malaysia | Soo Kar Seong | Taiwan | Lu Ching-yao |
| Malaysia | Akmal Rumsani | India | Prajakta Sawant | Malaysia | Tee Jing Yi | Taiwan | Wang Tzu-wei |
| Malaysia | Fairuz Fauzi | Malaysia | Goh Yea Ching | Malaysia | Woon Man Chun | Taiwan | Chen Chung-jen |
| Malaysia | Jenny Wan | Malaysia | Lyddia Cheah | Malaysia | Yang Li Lian | Taiwan | Wang Chi-lin |
| Malaysia | Lim Pei Yee | Malaysia | Chan Kwong Beng | | | Malaysia | Tan Wee Kiong |
| | | Malaysia | Shahzan Shah Misfahul Muneer | | | Malaysia | Soh Wooi Yik |
| | | | | | | Malaysia | Tan Jia Wei |
| Nusajaya BC | | Puchong United BC | | Petaling BC | | Klang United BC | |
| Country | Player | Country | Player | Country | Player | Country | Player |
| Hong Kong | Yip Pui Yin | Indonesia | Markis Kido | Japan | Kenichi Tago^1 | Indonesia | Simon Santoso |
| Thailand | Boonsak Ponsana | Malaysia | Woon Khe Wei | Malaysia | Soo Teck Zhi | Singapore | Derek Wong |
| Malaysia | Chong Yee Han | Indonesia | Fran Kurniawan | Malaysia | Yeoh Seng Zoe | Malaysia | Mohd Fairuzizuan Mohd Tazari |
| Malaysia | Cheam June Wei | Indonesia | Agripina Prima Rahmanto Putra | China | Zhao Yunlei | Malaysia | Nelson Heg |
| Malaysia | Julia Wong | Indonesia | Tommy Sugiarto | Malaysia | Goh V Shem | Malaysia | Teo Ee Yi |
| Malaysia | Hoon Thien How | Malaysia | Goh Sze Fei | Malaysia | Iskandar Zulkarnain | Malaysia | Yew Hong Woon |
| Malaysia | Lim Khim Wah | New Zealand | Maria Mata Masinipeni | Malaysia | James Hong Jun | Malaysia | Puah Chen Hao |
| Malaysia | Lim Ming Chuen | Malaysia | Liew Daren | Malaysia | Chong Chun Quan | Malaysia | Yap Zhen |
| Malaysia | Chang Hun Pin | Malaysia | Tan Wee Gieen | Malaysia | Shia Chun Kang | Malaysia | Lee Kian Onn |
| Indonesia | Andro Septian Purnomo | Malaysia | Lai Pei Jing | Malaysia | Chen Jia Huo | Malaysia | Leong Jun Hao |
| Malaysia | Haw Yong Yuan | Malaysia | Tan Aik Quan | Malaysia | Chen Tang Jie | Malaysia | Yap Yee |
| Malaysia | Kuan Beng Hong | Malaysia | Lim Chiew Sien | Malaysia | Lew Ming Hui | Malaysia | Yap Rui Chen |
| Malaysia | Lim Pek Siah | Malaysia | Yew Hong Kheng | Indonesia | Adriansyah Putra | Malaysia | Tio Sue Xin |
| Taiwan | Lai Chia-wen | Malaysia | Wong Fai Yin | Malaysia | Tan Vi Hen | Malaysia | Lee Meng Yean |
| Malaysia | Chong Li Qun | Malaysia | Lee Zii Jia | Malaysia | Wang Meng Yan | Malaysia | Yap Chee Rong |
| Malaysia | Lai Zing Neng | Malaysia | Vincent Phuah Cheng Wei | China | Chen Jiao | Singapore | Fu Mingtian |
| Malaysia | Shawn Sukit | Malaysia | Darren Issac Devadass | Indonesia | Tike Arieda Ningrum | Indonesia | Muhammad Rian Ardianto |
| Malaysia | Lee Yan Sheng | Malaysia | Peck Yen Wei | Malaysia | Lim Yin Fun | Indonesia | Kevin Sanjaya Sukamuljo |
| Malaysia | Lin Woon Fui | Malaysia | Tan Jinn Hwa | Indonesia | Rizky Hidayat | Indonesia | Firman Abdul Kholik |
| Malaysia | Ooi Swee Khoon | Malaysia | Lee Ying Ying | Malaysia | Ian Wong Jien Sern | Malaysia | Chooi Kah Ming |
| Cheras BC | | Bangsar Hawks BC | | Ampang Jaya BC | | Kajang BC | |
| Country | Player | Country | Player | Country | Player | Country | Player |
| Malaysia | Hafiz Hashim | Malaysia | Zulfadli Zulkiffli | Indonesia | Sony Dwi Kuncoro | Japan | Kento Momota |
| Malaysia | Koo Kien Keat | India | P. V. Sindhu | Indonesia | Alamsyah Yunus | Indonesia | Liliyana Natsir |
| Malaysia | Mohd Zakry Abdul Latif | India | Srikanth Kidambi | Indonesia | Aprilia Yuswandari | Indonesia | Hendra Setiawan |
| Malaysia | Razif Abdul Latif | Malaysia | R. Sathiestharan | Malaysia | Terry Hee | Malaysia | Man Wei Chong |
| Malaysia | Muhd Hafizi Hashim | Malaysia | M. Thinaah | Indonesia | Andre Kurniawan Tedjono | Malaysia | Kwek Yee Jian |
| Malaysia | Muhd Hafifi Hashim | Malaysia | Kavita Sylvia Kumares | Malaysia | Muhd Amzaar Zainuddin | Malaysia | Bong Guang Yik |
| Malaysia | Mohd Lutfi Zaim Abdul Khalid | Malaysia | Cheah Liek Hou | Malaysia | Ong Yew Sin | Malaysia | Chua Ching Weng |
| Thailand | Watchara Buranakruea | Singapore | Danny Bawa Chrisnanta | Malaysia | Shevon Lai Jemie | Malaysia | Loh Zefeng |
| Thailand | Trawut Potieng | Malaysia | Zulhelmi Zulkiffli | Malaysia | Goh Giap Chin | Malaysia | Shahrul Shazwan Shahrul Khairi |
| Indonesia | Marcus Fernaldi Gideon | Malaysia | Ahmad Maziri Mazlan | Malaysia | Ho Yen Mei | Malaysia | Victor Ong Jing Kai |
| Indonesia | Pia Zebadiah Bernadet | Malaysia | Nik Ahmad Afzar Nik Mazlan | Malaysia | William Ooi | Malaysia | Boon Wei Ying |
| Indonesia | Febby Angguni | Malaysia | Fazandra Yusfiandika Ahmad Yusri | Malaysia | Kelvin Ng | Malaysia | Wong Kin Yik |
| Malaysia | Soong Fie Cho | Malaysia | Ikmal Hussain Jaafar | Indonesia | Yuanda Hemi | South Africa | Jacob Maliekal |
| Malaysia | Goh Jian Hao | Malaysia | Krishna Kumar | Malaysia | Lim Yik Fong | Malaysia | Thanesh Veerapan |
| Malaysia | Syed Akbar Shah | Malaysia | Lee Zii Yii | Malaysia | Erica Khoo Pei Shan | Malaysia | Eizlan Shah Misfahul Muneer |
| Malaysia | Mohd Shakier Ruhaizad | Singapore | Ashton Chen Yong Zhao | Malaysia | Andrew Liw Zhang Zhau | Malaysia | Yap Kiam Yong |
| Thailand | Sarita Suwanakijboriharn | Singapore | Robin Gonansa | Malaysia | Tan Wee Tat | Malaysia | Linda Agnes |
| Malaysia | Gilbert Tan | Malaysia | Nur Izzuddin | Malaysia | Kuan Kam Chung | Malaysia | Ong Soon Hock |
| Malaysia | Lee Jo Yew | Singapore | Loh Kean Yew | Malaysia | Tay Ken Yew | Malaysia | See Phui Leng |
| Malaysia | Chong Chun Ning | Malaysia | Joyce Choong | Malaysia | Chua Keh Yeap | Malaysia | Chong Sook Chin |

^1-Kenichi Tago replaced Lee Chong Wei after he was suspended for failing a Dope Test at the 2014 BWF World Championships in Copenhagen
