= Malaysia Purple League =

Malaysia Purple League Liga Ungu Malaysia
- Current season, competition or edition: 2021–22 Malaysia Purple League
- Sport: Badminton
- Founded: 2014
- No. of teams: 8
- Country: Malaysia (8 teams)
- Most recent champion: (Selangor) Ampang Jaya BC
- Most titles: (Selangor) Puchong United BC (Johor) Muar City BC (2 titles each)
- Broadcaster: Astro
- Tournament format: Round-robin tournament (2014–2016); Elimination tournament (current)
- Website: purpleleague.com

The Malaysia Purple League (Malay: Liga Ungu Malaysia) is Malaysia's premier professional badminton league managed by Purple League (M) Sdn. Bhd. The seasons usually run from December to January. The League features local and international players ranging from Olympic medallist, World Champions, former stars and also rising talents. Players from 8 teams will participate in 3 stages on a round robin and play-off format for the coveted Senheng Purple League trophy and championship title. It offers a total prize money of RM1,500,000.

The 2021/2022 season kicked off at Malawati Stadium, Shah Alam on 1 October, while the finals will be held at the Arena of Stars in Resorts World Genting on 8 and 9 October.

== History ==
The league was formed in 2014. The Purple League was formed following the success of professional badminton leagues such as Premier Badminton League (India), China Badminton Super League and Superliga Badminton Indonesia.

== Past teams ==
Season 1
(Selangor) Ampang Jaya BC	(Kuala Lumpur) Bangsar Hawks BC	(Kuala Lumpur) Cheras BC	(Selangor) Kajang BC
(Kuala Lumpur) Kepong BC	(Selangor) Klang United BC	(Johor) Muar City BC	(Johor) Nusajaya BC
(Selangor) Petaling BC	(Selangor) Petaling Jaya BC	(Selangor) Puchong United BC	(Selangor) Serdang BC
Season 2
(Selangor) Ampang Jaya BC	(Kuala Lumpur) Bangsar Hawks BC	(Kuala Lumpur) Cheras BC	(Selangor) Kajang BC
(Kuala Lumpur) Kepong BC	(Selangor) Klang United BC	(Johor) Muar City BC	(Johor) Nusajaya BC
(Selangor) Petaling BC	(Selangor) Petaling Jaya BC	(Selangor) Puchong United BC	(Selangor) Serdang BC
Season 3
(Selangor) Ampang Jaya BC	(Kuala Lumpur) Bangsar Hawks BC	(Kuala Lumpur) Kepong BC	(Selangor) Klang City BC
(Selangor) BU Dragons BC	(Johor) Muar City BC	(Selangor) Serdang BC	(Selangor) Petaling BC
(Selangor) Petaling Jaya BC	(Selangor) Puchong United BC	Vacant	
Season 4
(Selangor) Ampang Jaya BC	(Kuala Lumpur) Bangsar Hawks BC	(Kuala Lumpur) Kepong BC	(Kuala Lumpur) Cheras BC
(Selangor) Puchong United BC	(Johor) Muar City BC	(Selangor) Serdang BC	(Selangor) Petaling Jaya BC
Season 5
(Selangor) Ampang Jaya BC	(Penang) Bukit Mertajam All Stars	(Kuala Lumpur) Kepong BC	(Johor) Tebrau City BC
(Selangor) Puchong United BC	(Johor) Muar City BC	(Selangor) Serdang BC	(Selangor) Petaling BC
Season 6
(Indonesia) Candra Wijaya International BC	(Thailand) Sena Bangkok Club	(Vietnam) Ho Chi Minh BC	Singapore Badminton Team
(Selangor) Puchong United BC	(Selangor) Ampang Jaya BC	(Selangor) Serdang BC	(Selangor) Petaling BC

== Results ==
Year	Final			Third place playoff			Number of teams
Year	Winners	Score	Runners-up	Third place	Score	Fourth place	Number of teams
2014 – 15	(Johor); Muar City BC	10–10 (157 – 150)	(Selangor); Petaling Jaya BC	(Kuala Lumpur); Kepong BC	9–8	(Selangor); Puchong United BC	12
2015 – 16	(Johor); Muar City BC	10–9	(Selangor); Petaling Jaya BC	(Selangor); Puchong United BC	8–8 (120 – 112)	(Kuala Lumpur); Cheras BC	12
2016 – 17	(Selangor); Petaling Jaya BC	13–9	(Selangor); Puchong United BC	(Johor); Muar City BC	11–6	(Selangor); BU Dragons BC	10
2017 – 18	(Selangor); Puchong United BC	10–8	(Kuala Lumpur); Kepong BC	(Selangor); Petaling Jaya BC	9–2	(Kuala Lumpur); Cheras BC	8
2018 – 19	(Selangor); Puchong United BC	10–6	(Kuala Lumpur); Kepong BC	(Selangor); Petaling Jaya BC	11–7	(Selangor); Ampang Jaya BC	8
2021 – 22	(Selangor); Ampang Jaya BC	9–2	(Selangor); Petaling BC	(Selangor); Puchong United BC	10–5	(Thailand); Sena Bangkok Club	8

== Performances by teams ==
Club	Champions	Runners-up	Third place	Fourth place
(Selangor) Puchong United BC	2 (2017–18, 2018–19)	1 (2016–17)	2 (2015–16, 2021–22)	1 (2014–15)
(Johor) Muar City BC	2 (2014–15, 2015–16)	—	1 (2016–17)	—
(Selangor) Petaling Jaya BC	1 (2016–17)	2 (2014–15, 2015–16)	2 (2017–18, 2018–19)	—
(Selangor) Ampang Jaya BC	1 (2021–22)	—	—	1 (2018–19)
(Kuala Lumpur) Kepong BC	—	2 (2017–18, 2018–19)	1 (2014–15)	—
(Selangor) Petaling BC	—	1 (2021–22)	—	—
(Kuala Lumpur) Cheras BC	—	—	—	2 (2015–16, 2017–18)
(Selangor) BU Dragons BC	—	—	—	1 (2016–17)
(Thailand) Sena Bangkok Club	—	—	—	1 (2021–22)

== Sponsorship ==
- 2014–2015: Kopiko (Kopiko Purple League)
- 2015–2016: Resorts World Genting (Resorts World Genting Purple League)
- 2016–2019: Senheng Samsung (SS Purple League)
- 2021/2022: Senheng redOne (SenHeng redOne Purple League)
