= Chan Peng Soon =

Malaysian former badminton player (born 1988)

Chan Peng Soon 陈炳顺
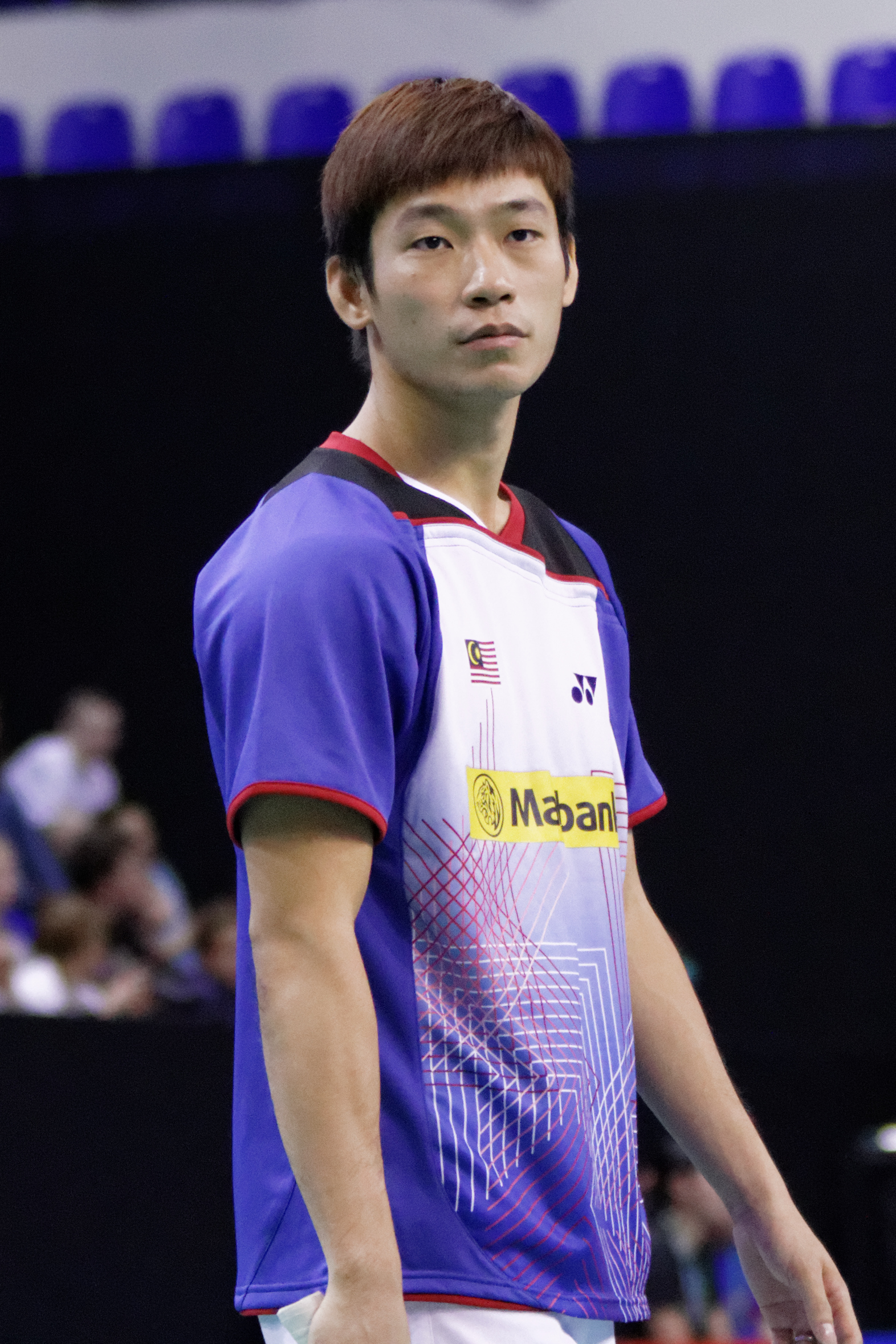
- Chan at the 2013 French Super Series

Personal information
- Born: 27 April 1988 (age 38) George Town, Penang, Malaysia
- Height: 1.75 m (5 ft 9 in)

Sport
- Country: Malaysia
- Sport: Badminton
- Handedness: Right
- Retired: 22 May 2024

Mixed doubles
- Highest ranking: 3 (with Goh Liu Ying) (22 November 2012)
- BWF profile
Medal record
Men's badminton
Representing Malaysia
Olympic Games
Silver medal – second place	2016 Rio de Janeiro	Mixed doubles
Thomas Cup
Silver medal – second place	2014 New Delhi	Men's team
Commonwealth Games
Gold medal – first place	2010 New Delhi	Mixed team
Gold medal – first place	2014 Glasgow	Mixed team
Gold medal – first place	2022 Birmingham	Mixed team
Silver medal – second place	2018 Gold Coast	Mixed team
Bronze medal – third place	2018 Gold Coast	Mixed doubles
Asian Games
Bronze medal – third place	2014 Incheon	Men's team
Asian Championships
Gold medal – first place	2010 New Delhi	Mixed doubles
SEA Games
Silver medal – second place	2009 Vientiane	Men's team
Silver medal – second place	2015 Singapore	Mixed doubles
Silver medal – second place	2017 Kuala Lumpur	Men's team
Bronze medal – third place	2009 Vientiane	Mixed doubles
Bronze medal – third place	2015 Singapore	Men's team
Bronze medal – third place	2017 Kuala Lumpur	Mixed doubles

Chan Peng Soon
- Traditional Chinese: 陳炳順
- Simplified Chinese: 陈炳顺
Transcriptions
Standard Mandarin
- Hanyu Pinyin: Chén Bǐngshùn
Yue: Cantonese
- Jyutping: Can4 Bing2 Seon6
Southern Min
- Hokkien POJ: Tân Péng-sūn

Chan Peng Soon AMN (born 27 April 1988) is a Malaysian former badminton player specialised in the mixed doubles event. He has had a partnership with Goh Liu Ying where they have been consistently ranked among the top 10 mixed doubles pair in the world. Chan and Goh reached a career high ranking of world number 3 in 2012 and won the silver medal at the 2016 Rio Olympics.

== Career ==
=== 2009–2013 ===
In July 2009, Chan won his first senior international title with Lim Khim Wah at the Thailand Open by defeating compatriots Choong Tan Fook and Lee Wan Wah in the final. In October 2009, Chan and Goh Liu Ying reached their first international tournament final at the Vietnam Open but were defeated by Flandy Limpele and Cheng Wen-hsing.

In April 2010, they became the country's first ever mixed doubles champions in a top-flight international tournament after winning the Badminton Asia Championships by defeating South Korean's Yoo Yeon-seong and Kim Min-jung in the final. At the 2010 Commonwealth Games, he won the gold medal in mixed team event. In the mixed doubles event, Chan and Goh lost the bronze medal match to Chayut Triyachart and Yao Lei.

In May 2011, they finished as runner-ups to Indonesian pair, Tontowi Ahmad and Liliyana Natsir in the final of the Malaysia Open. In November 2011, they won the Bitburger Open after defeating Denmark's Thomas Laybourn and Kamilla Rytter Juhl.

In March 2012, they reached the semi-finals of the All England Open before losing to the eventual champions, Tontowi Ahmad and Liliyana Natsir. In the following month, they became the runner-up of the Australia Open after losing to Chinese Taipei's Chen Hung-Ling and Cheng Wen-Hsing in the final. They gained their first ever Malaysia Open crown by beating Indonesian pair, Irfan Fadhilah and Weni Anggraini.

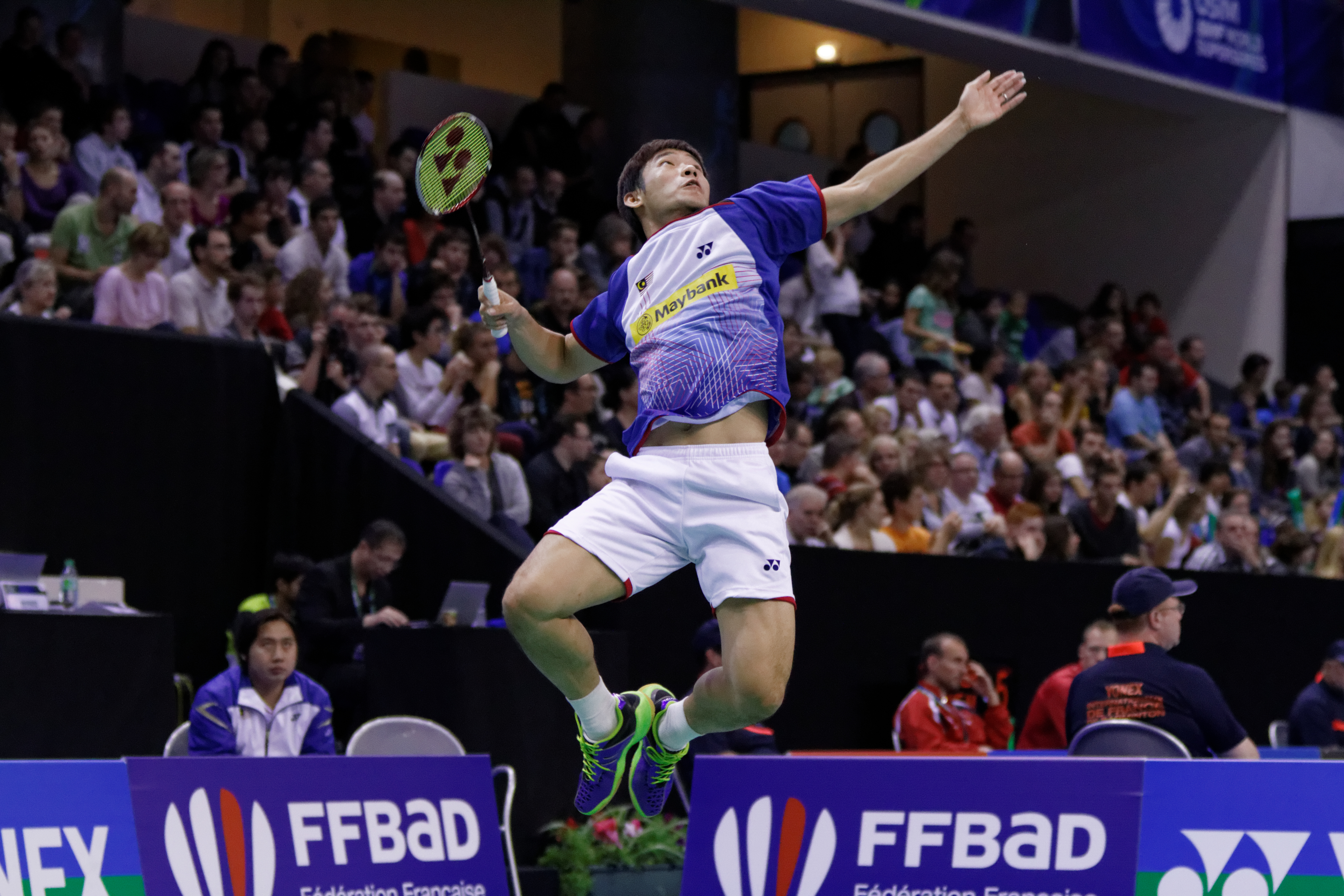
Chan at the 2013 French Open

Chan and Goh represented Malaysia at the 2012 London Olympics. They were the first ever Malaysian mixed doubles pair to qualify for the Olympic Games. They lost all three group matches and failed to progress to quarter-finals in their Olympics debut. In September 2012, Chan and Goh won their first Super Series title at the Japan Open by beating Muhammad Rijal and Liliyana Natsir. In November 2012, they reached the final of the China Open but were defeated by top seed, Xu Chen and Ma Jin in straight sets.

In January 2013, Chan and Goh became the runner-ups of the Malaysia Open after losing to Joachim Fischer Nielsen and Christinna Pedersen in the final.

=== 2014–2017 ===
In January 2014, Lai Pei Jing was chosen as his new partner while Goh went on hiatus to recover from knee surgery. In their first international competition together, Chan and Lai reached the final of Austrian International before losing to Robert Mateusiak and Agnieszka Wojtkowska.

In April 2014, Chan briefly resumed his partnership with Goh at the Singapore Open. Chan resumed his partnership with Lai after Goh decided to undergo surgery on both her knees and being out of action for the rest of the year. At the 2014 Commonwealth Games, Chan won the gold medal in the mixed team event. In the individual mixed doubles event, Chan and Lai lost the bronze medal match to Robert Blair and Imogen Bankier.

Chan resumed his partnership with Goh in 2015 where they won three titles that year: the Polish Open, Russian Open and the Mexico Open. At the 2015 SEA Games, they won a silver medal after losing to Indonesia's Praveen Jordan and Debby Susanto in the mixed doubles final.

In February 2016, they were runner-ups of the inaugural edition of Thailand Masters after losing to unseeded Chinese pair, Zheng Siwei and Chen Qingchen in the final. In March 2016, they clinched their first title of the year by winning the New Zealand Open. In April 2016, they lost to Indonesian pair, Tontowi Ahmad and Liliyana Natsir in the final of the Malaysia Open.

Goh and Chan qualified for 2016 Summer Olympics in Rio de Janeiro. They won their first two group stage matches but lost the third to Indonesian pair, Tontowi Ahmad and Liliyana Natsir. They finished as group runner-ups and progress to quarter finals round. In the quarter finals, they beat Poland's Robert Mateusiak and Nadieżda Zięba. In the semi-finals, they beat China's Xu Chen and Ma Jin in straight sets to reach the final.

In the final, they had to settle for silver medal after they were beaten by Tontowi Ahmad and Liliyana Natsir for the second time in the tournament. Despite the fact that Goh and Chan lost in the final, they had created history by being the first Malaysian mixed doubles pair to claim an Olympic medal.

In March 2017, Chan and Goh became the first Malaysian mixed doubles pair to reach the All England Open final since 1955. They were close to winning but lost to China's Lu Kai and Huang Yaqiong in rubber sets, in which a few controversial fault calls were made by the umpire against them. In April 2017, they reached the semi-finals of Indian Open but were forced to concede a walkover to Zheng Siwei and Chen Qingchen after Goh fell ill. They later suffered a first round loss to Edi Subaktiar-Gloria Emanuelle Widjaja in the Malaysia Open.

With Goh out of action due to injury, Chan was paired up with Peck Yen Wei at the Indonesian Open where they reached the semi-finals. In June 2017, he paired up with Cheah Yee See where they reached the quarter-finals of the Australian Open. In July 2017, the pair won their first career title together at the Russia Open. At the 2017 SEA Games, he won silver in the men's team and bronze in the individual mixed doubles events. In September 2017, Chan and Cheah reached the semifinal of the Korea Open before losing to Wang Yilyu and Huang Dongping.

=== 2018–present ===
In January 2018, he resumed his partnership with Goh and they won the Thailand Masters. Chan participated in the 2018 Commonwealth Games where he won the silver medal in the mixed team event. Chan and Goh reached the semifinals of the individual mixed doubles event before being defeated by Chris Adcock and Gabby Adcock. They later acquired the bronze medal by defeating Indian pair Satwiksairaj Rankireddy and Ashwini Ponnappa.

In December 2018, he announced his resignation from the Badminton Association of Malaysia (BAM) alongside his partner, Goh Liu Ying effective 1 January 2019. He also participated in the 2018–19 Malaysia Purple League representing Ampang Jaya Badminton Club by partnering temporarily with Shevon Jamie Lai. He was also a temporary coach for Tan Wee Kiong and Goh V Shem.

In July 2021, Chan with his partner Goh competed at the 2020 Summer Olympics, but were eliminated in the group stage.

On December 6, 2021, Chan announced in an Instagram post that he and Goh have decided to split up after 13 years of playing badminton together. Chan will continue his career in badminton after splitting up for good with Goh. He rejoined BAM starting from 1 January 2022. Valeree Siow was chosen as Chan's new partner and the India Open was their first tournament together. From May 2022, Chan resumed his 2017 partnership with Cheah Yee See, their first competition together being the Indonesia Open.

== Personal life ==
He is married to Malaysian singer Esther Cham May May since September 2010. They have four children: Milton, Hannah, Julian and Leah.

=== Sponsorship ===
In May 2019, Chan and Goh were appointed by as Yobick Malaysia brand ambassadors.

== Achievements ==
=== Olympic Games ===
Mixed doubles
Year	Venue	Partner	Opponent	Score	Result
2016	Riocentro - Pavilion 4, Rio de Janeiro, Brazil	(Malaysia) Goh Liu Ying	(Indonesia) Tontowi Ahmad (Indonesia) Liliyana Natsir	14–21, 12–21	Silver

=== Commonwealth Games ===
Mixed doubles
Year	Venue	Partner	Opponent	Score	Result
2018	Carrara Sports and Leisure Centre; Gold Coast, Australia	(Malaysia) Goh Liu Ying	(India) Satwiksairaj Rankireddy (India) Ashwini Ponnappa	21–19, 21–19	Bronze

=== Asian Championships ===
Mixed doubles
Year	Venue	Partner	Opponent	Score	Result
2010	Siri Fort Indoor Stadium, New Delhi, India	(Malaysia) Goh Liu Ying	(South Korea) Yoo Yeon-seong (South Korea) Kim Min-jung	21–17, 20–22, 21–19	Gold

=== SEA Games ===
Mixed doubles
Year	Venue	Partner	Opponent	Score	Result
2009	Gym Hall 1, National Sports Complex, Vientiane, Laos	(Malaysia) Goh Liu Ying	(Thailand) Songphon Anugritayawon (Thailand) Kunchala Voravichitchaikul	18–21, 13–21	Bronze
2015	Singapore Indoor Stadium, Singapore	(Malaysia) Goh Liu Ying	(Indonesia) Praveen Jordan (Indonesia) Debby Susanto	21–18, 13–21, 23–25	Silver
2017	Axiata Arena, Kuala Lumpur, Malaysia	(Malaysia) Cheah Yee See	(Thailand) Dechapol Puavaranukroh (Thailand) Sapsiree Taerattanachai	16–21, 21–18, 21–23	Bronze

=== BWF World Tour (5 titles, 2 runners-up) ===
The BWF World Tour, which was announced on 19 March 2017 and implemented in 2018, is a series of elite badminton tournaments sanctioned by the Badminton World Federation (BWF). The BWF World Tour is divided into levels of World Tour Finals, Super 1000, Super 750, Super 500, Super 300 (part of the HSBC World Tour), and the BWF Tour Super 100.

Mixed doubles
Year	Tournament	Level	Partner	Opponent	Score	Result
2018	Thailand Masters	Super 300	(Malaysia) Goh Liu Ying	(Thailand) Dechapol Puavaranukroh (Thailand) Puttita Supajirakul	21–15, 14–21, 21–16	(gold) Winner
2018	Australian Open	Super 300	(Malaysia) Goh Liu Ying	(South Korea) Seo Seung-jae (South Korea) Chae Yoo-jung	12–21, 21–23	(silver) Runner-up
2018	U.S. Open	Super 300	(Malaysia) Goh Liu Ying	(Germany) Marvin Seidel (Germany) Linda Efler	21–19, 21–15	(gold) Winner
2018	Indonesia Open	Super 1000	(Malaysia) Goh Liu Ying	(Indonesia) Tontowi Ahmad (Indonesia) Liliyana Natsir	17–21, 8–21	(silver) Runner-up
2019	Thailand Masters	Super 300	(Malaysia) Goh Liu Ying	(Thailand) Dechapol Puavaranukroh (Thailand) Sapsiree Taerattanachai	21–16, 21–15	(gold) Winner
2019	New Zealand Open	Super 300	(Malaysia) Goh Liu Ying	(Indonesia) Praveen Jordan (Indonesia) Melati Daeva Oktavianti	21–14, 16–21, 29–27	(gold) Winner
2023	Malaysia Super 100	Super 100	(Malaysia) Cheah Yee See	(Thailand) Pakkapon Teeraratsakul (Thailand) Phataimas Muenwong	21–9, 17–21, 21–10	(gold) Winner

=== BWF Superseries (1 title, 4 runners-up) ===
The BWF Superseries, which was launched on 14 December 2006 and implemented in 2007, was a series of elite badminton tournaments, sanctioned by the Badminton World Federation (BWF). BWF Superseries levels were Superseries and Superseries Premier. A season of Superseries consisted of twelve tournaments around the world that had been introduced since 2011. Successful players were invited to the Superseries Finals, which were held at the end of each year.

Mixed doubles
Year	Tournament	Partner	Opponent	Score	Result
2012	Japan Open	(Malaysia) Goh Liu Ying	(Indonesia) Muhammad Rijal (Indonesia) Liliyana Natsir	21–12, 21–19	(gold) Winner
2012	China Open	(Malaysia) Goh Liu Ying	(China) Xu Chen (China) Ma Jin	15–21, 17–21	(silver) Runner-up
2013	Malaysia Open	(Malaysia) Goh Liu Ying	(Denmark) Joachim Fischer Nielsen (Denmark) Christinna Pedersen	13–21, 18–21	(silver) Runner-up
2016	Malaysia Open	(Malaysia) Goh Liu Ying	(Indonesia) Tontowi Ahmad (Indonesia) Liliyana Natsir	21–23, 21–13, 16–21	(silver) Runner-up
2017	All England Open	(Malaysia) Goh Liu Ying	(China) Lu Kai (China) Huang Yaqiong	21–18, 19–21, 16–21	(silver) Runner-up

BWF Super Series Finals tournament
BWF Super Series Premier tournament
BWF Super Series tournament

=== BWF Grand Prix (7 titles, 4 runners-up) ===
The BWF Grand Prix had two levels, the Grand Prix and Grand Prix Gold. It was a series of badminton tournaments sanctioned by the Badminton World Federation (BWF) and played between 2007 and 2017.

Men's doubles
Year	Tournament	Partner	Opponent	Score	Result
2009	Thailand Open	(Malaysia) Lim Khim Wah	(Malaysia) Choong Tan Fook (Malaysia) Lee Wan Wah	20–22, 21–14, 21–11	(gold) Winner

Mixed doubles
Year	Tournament	Partner	Opponent	Score	Result
2009	Vietnam Open	(Malaysia) Goh Liu Ying	(Indonesia) Flandy Limpele (Chinese Taipei) Cheng Wen-hsing	23–25, 19–21	(silver) Runner-up
2011	Malaysia Grand Prix Gold	(Malaysia) Goh Liu Ying	(Indonesia) Tontowi Ahmad (Indonesia) Liliyana Natsir	21–18, 15–21, 19–21	(silver) Runner-up
2011	Bitburger Open	(Malaysia) Goh Liu Ying	(Denmark) Thomas Laybourn (Denmark) Kamilla Rytter Juhl	21–18, 14–21, 27–25	(gold) Winner
2012	Australian Open	(Malaysia) Goh Liu Ying	(Chinese Taipei) Chen Hung-ling (Chinese Taipei) Cheng Wen-hsing	20–22, 21–12, 21–23	(silver) Runner-up
2012	Malaysia Grand Prix Gold	(Malaysia) Goh Liu Ying	(Indonesia) Irfan Fadhilah (Indonesia) Weni Anggraini	21–12, 21–14	(gold) Winner
2015	Russian Open	(Malaysia) Goh Liu Ying	(Japan) Yuta Watanabe (Japan) Arisa Higashino	21–14, 21–12	(gold) Winner
2015	Mexico City Grand Prix	(Malaysia) Goh Liu Ying	(South Korea) Choi Sol-gyu (South Korea) Eom Hye-won	21–14，21-12	(gold) Winner
2016	Thailand Masters	(Malaysia) Goh Liu Ying	(China) Zheng Siwei (China) Chen Qingchen	17–21, 15–21	(silver) Runner-up
2016	New Zealand Open	(Malaysia) Goh Liu Ying	(China) Zheng Siwei (China) Li Yinhui	21–19, 22–20	(gold) Winner
2017	Russian Open	(Malaysia) Cheah Yee See	(Japan) Keiichiro Matsui (Japan) Akane Araki	11–8, 11–13, 11–3	(gold) Winner

BWF Grand Prix Gold tournament
BWF Grand Prix tournament

=== BWF International Challenge/Series/Satellite (5 titles, 5 runners-up) ===
Men's doubles
Year	Tournament	Partner	Opponent	Score	Result
2006	Sri Lanka Satellite	(Malaysia) Chang Hun Pin	(Malaysia) Mohd Razif Abdul Latif (Malaysia) Khoo Chung Chiat	18–21, 21–14, 21–19	(gold) Winner
2006	India Satellite	(Malaysia) Chang Hun Pin	(India) Sanave Thomas (India) K. T. Rupesh Kumar	21–19, 8–21, 20–22	(silver) Runner-up
2007	Malaysia International	(Malaysia) Chang Hun Pin	(Malaysia) Mohd Razif Abdul Latif (Malaysia) Khoo Chung Chiat	21–14, 11–21, 21–11	(gold) Winner
2007	India International	(Malaysia) Chang Hun Pin	(India) James Jayan (India) T. Dinesh	21–8, 21–15	(gold) Winner
2008	Vietnam International	(Malaysia) Mohd Razif Abdul Latif	(Malaysia) Hong Chieng Hun (Malaysia) Ng Kean Kok	21–19, 26–28, 13–21	(silver) Runner-up
2009	Malaysia International	(Malaysia) Lim Khim Wah	(Thailand) Bodin Isara (Thailand) Maneepong Jongjit	22–20, 28–26	(gold) Winner

Mixed doubles
Year	Tournament	Partner	Opponent	Score	Result
2006	Sri Lanka Satellite	(Malaysia) Haw Chiou Hwee	(India) Chetan Anand (India) Jwala Gutta	10–21, 21–15, 18–21	(silver) Runner-up
2014	Austrian International	(Malaysia) Lai Pei Jing	(Poland) Robert Mateusiak (Poland) Agnieszka Wojtkowska	15–21, 21–15, 16–21	(silver) Runner-up
2015	Polish Open	(Malaysia) Goh Liu Ying	(India) Akshay Dewalkar (India) Pradnya Gadre	28–26, 21–18	(gold) Winner
2015	Orleans International	(Malaysia) Goh Liu Ying	(Denmark) Mathias Christiansen (Denmark) Lena Grebak	21–11, 17–21, 19–21	(silver) Runner-up

BWF International Challenge tournament
BWF Future Series tournament

== Honours ==
- Malaysia
  - Member of the Order of the Defender of the Realm (A.M.N.) (2017)
