= Lim Yin Fun =

Malaysian badminton player (born 1994)

Lim Yin Fun 林吟芳
Personal information
- Born: 13 November 1994 (age 31) Kuala Lumpur, Malaysia
- Height: 1.50 m (4 ft 11 in)
- Weight: 59 kg (130 lb)

Sport
- Country: Malaysia
- Sport: Badminton
- Handedness: Right
- Coached by: Wong Tat Meng

Women's singles & doubles
- Highest ranking: 71 (WS 15 June 2017); 156 (WD 8 September 2011)
- BWF profile
Medal record
Women's badminton
Representing Malaysia
Southeast Asian Games
Silver medal – second place	2015 Singapore	Women's team
World Junior Championships
Gold medal – first place	2011 Taipei	Mixed team
Asian Junior Championships
Silver medal – second place	2011 Lucknow	Mixed team
Silver medal – second place	2010 Kuala Lumpur	Mixed team
Bronze medal – third place	2012 Gimcheon	Mixed team

Lim Yin Fun (born 13 November 1994) is a Malaysian badminton player. In 2016, she became the runner-up at the Romanian and Vietnam International Series tournament in the women's singles event.

== Achievements ==
=== BWF International Challenge/Series ===
Women's singles
Year	Tournament	Opponent	Score	Result
2016	Vietnam International Series	(Chinese Taipei) Chen Su-yu	19–21, 21–23	(silver) Runner-up
2016	Romanian International	(Malaysia) Lee Ying Ying	21–17, 13–21, 9–21	(silver) Runner-up

BWF International Challenge tournament
BWF International Series tournament
BWF Future Series tournament
