= Xu Wei (badminton) =

Chinese badminton player (born 1995)

Xu Wei 徐蔚
Personal information
- Born: 27 January 1995 (age 31)

Sport
- Country: China; France; Austria (since March 2025)
- Sport: Badminton

Women's singles
- Highest ranking: 193 (29 September 2016)
- BWF profile

Xu Wei (Chinese: 徐薇; pinyin: Xú Wēi, born 27 January 1995) is a Chinese-born Austrian badminton player. Xu started representing Austria in the international tournament in March 2025. In 2020, she arrived in Europe, living in Madrid, and joined the Cholet badminton team in Maine-et-Loire, France.

== Achievements ==
=== BWF International Challenge/Series (2 titles, 4 runners-up) ===
Women's singles
Year	Tournament	Opponent	Score	Result
2016	Austrian Open	(Germany) Olga Konon	22–20, 21–15	(gold) Winner
2016	Sydney International	(Japan) Shiori Saito	14–21, 13–21	(silver) Runner-up
2025	Polish International	(Chinese Taipei) Peng Yu-wei	8–21, 7–21	(silver) Runner-up
2025	Welsh International	(Sri Lanka) Ranithma Liyanage	16–21, 21–10, 21–19	(gold) Winner

Women's doubles
Year	Tournament	Partner	Opponent	Score	Result
2024	Hungarian International	(Sweden) Malena Norrman	(England) Abbygael Harris (England) Lizzie Tolman	21–19, 19–21, 14–21	(silver) Runner-up
2025	Slovenia Open	(Sweden) Malena Norrman	(Chinese Taipei) Lin Chih-chun (Chinese Taipei) Lin Wan-ching	7–21, 14–21	(silver) Runner-up

BWF International Challenge tournament
BWF International Series tournament
BWF Future Series tournament
