= Ho Yen Mei =

Malaysian badminton player

Ho Yen Mei 何艳美
Personal information
- Born: 29 April 1996 (age 30)
- Height: 1.59 m (5 ft 3 in)

Sport
- Country: Malaysia
- Sport: Badminton
- Handedness: Right
- Coached by: Wong Tat Meng and Rony Agustinus

Women's singles
- Highest ranking: 54 (13 October 2016)
- BWF profile
Medal record
Women's badminton
Representing Malaysia
SEA Games
Silver medal – second place	2015 Singapore	Women's team
Silver medal – second place	2017 Kuala Lumpur	Women's team

Ho Yen Mei
- Traditional Chinese: 何豔美
- Simplified Chinese: 何艳美
Transcriptions
Standard Mandarin
- Hanyu Pinyin: Hé yànměi

Ho Yen Mei (born 29 April 1996) is a Malaysian badminton player who competes in the singles category. She won the women's singles title at the BWF Tour Super 100 2018 Russian Open. Ho won 2015 Polish International in the women's singles. Ho was also the part of the Malaysia team that won the women's team silver at the 2015 and 2017 SEA Games.

== Early life ==
Ho was born on 29 April 1996 to her father, Albert Ho. When she was young, her family used to go to the Pandan Lake Club. Her mother would take her for swimming classes while her father played badminton. After swimming classes, she and her mother would wait for her father. Yen Mei then started playing badminton with her father and his friends. A year later, she signed up for badminton classes. She got a place at the Bukit Jalil Sports School when she was Form Three.

Ho has said that she would have become a swimmer if not for her father, and that she has no regrets taking up badminton whilst she still favours swimming.

== Achievements ==
=== BWF World Tour ===
The BWF World Tour, which was announced on 19 March 2017 and implemented in 2018, is a series of elite badminton tournaments sanctioned by the Badminton World Federation (BWF). The BWF World Tours are divided into levels of World Tour Finals, Super 1000, Super 750, Super 500, Super 300 (part of the HSBC World Tour), and the BWF Tour Super 100.

Women's singles
Year	Tournament	Level	Opponent	Score	Result
2018	Russian Open	Super 100	(Japan) Shiori Ebihara	22–20, 11–21, 21–18	(gold) Winner

=== BWF International Challenge/Series ===
Women's singles
Year	Tournament	Opponent	Score	Result
2013	Smiling Fish International	(Thailand) Rawinda Prajongjai	9–21, 19–21	(silver) Runner-up
2015	Polish International	(Malaysia) Lim Chiew Sien	21–16, 21–12	(gold) Winner
2016	Malaysia International	(Japan) Sayaka Takahashi	17–21, 11–21	(silver) Runner-up

BWF International Challenge tournament
BWF International Series tournament
BWF Future Series tournament

=== National Championships ===
Year	Tournament	Category	Opponent in final	Score
2014	(Malaysia) 100PLUS National Junior Circuit Grand Prix Finals (Kuala Lumpur)	GS U18	(Malaysia) Yap Rui Chen	21–15, 21–18
2014	(Malaysia) Maybank National Circuit Perak Open (1st Leg)	WS [D1]	(Malaysia) Yang Li Lian	23–21, 19–21, 21–12
