= 2013 BWF World Junior Championships – Team event knockout stage =

This article lists the complete results of the knock out stage of the 2013 BWF World Junior Championships – Teams event in Bangkok, Thailand.

== Bracket ==
Quarterfinals
W1	China	3
W2	Chinese Taipei	0
X1	Indonesia	3
X2	Malaysia	1
Y1	Japan	3
Y2	Thailand	2
Z1	South Korea	3
Z2	Vietnam	0

Semifinals
W1	China	2
X1	Indonesia	3
Y1	Japan	1
Z1	South Korea	3

Final
X1	Indonesia	2
Z1	South Korea	3
Bronze-medal match
W1	China	3
Y1	Japan	2

== Result ==
=== Quarter-finals ===
==== China vs Chinese Taipei ====
China
3
Hua Mark Stadium Court 5
25 October 2013

Chinese Taipei
0

			1	2	3
1	(China) (Chinese Taipei)	Huang Kaixiang / Chen Qingchen; Wang Chi-lin / Chang Ching-hui	21; 17	21; 11
2	(China) (Chinese Taipei)	Shi Yuqi; Wang Tzu-wei	21; 18	19; 21	21; 14
3	(China) (Chinese Taipei)	Li Junhui / Liu Yuchen; Wang Chi-lin / Tien Tzu-chieh	21; 16	21; 18
4	(China) (Chinese Taipei)	He Bingjiao; Yu Chien-hui				not played
5	(China) (Chinese Taipei)	Huang Dongping / Jia Yifan; Chang Ching-hui / Chang Hsin-tien				not played

==== Indonesia vs Malaysia ====
Indonesia
3
Hua Mark Stadium Court 4
25 October 2013

Malaysia
1

			1	2	3
1	(Indonesia) (Malaysia)	Kevin Sanjaya Sukamuljo / Masita Mahmudin; Ong Yew Sin / Yap Cheng Wen	21; 10	19; 21	19; 21
2	(Indonesia) (Malaysia)	Jonatan Christie; Soo Teck Zhi	21; 10	21; 14
3	(Indonesia) (Malaysia)	Hanna Ramadhini; Goh Jin Wei	21; 14	21; 10
4	(Indonesia) (Malaysia)	Kevin Sanjaya Sukamuljo / Arya Maulana Aldiartama; Darren Isaac Devadass / Chua Khek Wei	21; 17	21; 12
5	(Indonesia) (Malaysia)	Rosyita Eka Putri Sari / Setyana Mapasa; Joyce Choong Wai Chi / Yap Cheng Wen				not played

==== Japan vs Thailand ====
Japan
3
Hua Mark Stadium Court 1
25 October 2013

Thailand
2

			1	2	3
1	(Japan) (Thailand)	Takuro Hoki / Yugo Kobayashi; Kittinupong Ketlen / Dechapol Puavaranukroh	14; 21	23; 21	9; 21
2	(Japan) (Thailand)	Aya Ohori; Busanan Ongbumrungpan	11; 21	14; 21
3	(Japan) (Thailand)	Yusuke Onodera; Pannawit Thongnuam	21; 14	21; 19
4	(Japan) (Thailand)	Wakana Nagahara / Rena Miyaura; Lam Narissapat / Puttita Supajirakul	21; 19	23; 21
5	(Japan) (Thailand)	Takuto Inoue / Akane Yamaguchi; Thanadol Jumpanoi / Ruethaichanok Laisuan	21; 14	25; 23

==== South Korea vs Vietnam ====
South Korea
3
Hua Mark Stadium Court 7
25 October 2013

Vietnam
0

			1	2	3
1	(South Korea) (Vietnam)	Choi Sol-kyu / Chae Yoo-jung; Nguyen Dinh Tuan Kiet / Do Thi Hoai	21; 5	21; 12
2	(South Korea) (Vietnam)	Jeon Hyuk-jin; Pham Cao Cuong	21; 13	21; 14
3	(South Korea) (Vietnam)	Choi Sol-kyu / Heo Kwang-hee; Do Tuan Duc / Pham Hong Nam	21; 19	21; 7
4	(South Korea) (Vietnam)	Kim Hyo-min; Nguyen Thuy Linh				not played
5	(South Korea) (Vietnam)	Chae Yoo-jung / Kim Ji-won; Do Thi Hoai / Dinh Thi Phuong Hong				not played

=== Semi-final ===
==== China vs Indonesia ====
China
2
Hua Mark Stadium Court 1
26 October 2013

Indonesia
3

			1	2	3
1	(China) (Indonesia)	Liu Yuchen / Zheng Siwei; Kevin Sanjaya Sukamuljo / Arya Maulana Aldiartama	21; 15	21; 13
2	(China) (Indonesia)	Qin Jinjing; Hanna Ramadhini	18; 21	16; 21
3	(China) (Indonesia)	Shi Yuqi; Jonatan Christie	14; 21	18; 21
4	(China) (Indonesia)	Huang Dongping / Jia Yifan; Rosyita Eka Putri Sari / Setyana Mapasa	15; 21	21; 14	21; 11
5	(China) (Indonesia)	Huang Kaixiang / Chen Qingchen; Kevin Sanjaya Sukamuljo / Masita Mahmudin	21; 19	16; 21	15; 21

==== Japan vs South Korea ====
Japan
1
Hua Mark Stadium Court 2
26 October 2013

South Korea
3

			1	2	3
1	(Japan) (South Korea)	Takuto Inoue / Akane Yamaguchi; Choi Sol-kyu / Chae Yoo-jung	18; 21	17; 21
2	(Japan) (South Korea)	Yusuke Onodera; Jeon Hyuk-jin	19; 21	21; 14	15; 21
3	(Japan) (South Korea)	Takuro Hoki / Yugo Kobayashi; Choi Sol-kyu / Heo Kwang-hee	25; 23	21; 18
4	(Japan) (South Korea)	Aya Ohori; Kim Hyo-min	14; 21	21; 18	19; 21
5	(Japan) (South Korea)	Wakana Nagahara / Rena Miyaura; Chae Yoo-jung / Kim Ji-won				not played

=== Bronze Medal Final ===
==== China vs Japan ====
China
3
Hua Mark Stadium Court 1
27 October 2013

Japan
2

			1	2	3
1	(China) (Japan)	Liu Yuchen / Zheng Siwei; Takuro Hoki / Yugo Kobayashi	16; 21	21; 15	18; 21
2	(China) (Japan)	He Bingjiao; Akane Yamaguchi	9; 21	21; 16	12; 21
3	(China) (Japan)	Lin Guipu; Kanta Tsuneyama	21; 17	21; 14
4	(China) (Japan)	Huang Dongping / Jia Yifan; Wakana Nagahara / Rena Miyaura	21; 11	14; 21	21; 17
5	(China) (Japan)	Huang Kaixiang / Chen Qingchen; Takuto Inoue / Akane Yamaguchi	21; 11	22; 24	21; 16

=== Final ===
==== Indonesia vs South Korea ====
Indonesia
2
Hua Mark Stadium Court 1
27 October 2013

South Korea
3

			1	2	3
1	(Indonesia) (South Korea)	Kevin Sanjaya Sukamuljo / Masita Mahmudin; Choi Sol-kyu / Chae Yoo-jung	21; 19	21; 16
2	(Indonesia) (South Korea)	Jonatan Christie; Jeon Hyuk-jin	16; 21	19; 21
3	(Indonesia) (South Korea)	Kevin Sanjaya Sukamuljo / Arya Maulana Aldiartama; Choi Sol-kyu / Heo Kwang-hee	21; 16	22; 20
4	(Indonesia) (South Korea)	Hanna Ramadhini; Kim Hyo-min	15; 21	18; 21
5	(Indonesia) (South Korea)	Rosyita Eka Putri Sari / Setyana Mapasa; Chae Yoo-jung / Kim Ji-won	18; 21	11; 21
