= 2017 BWF Super Series Finals =

Tournament details
- Dates: 13–17 December
- Level: International
- Total prize money: US$1,000,000
- Venue: Hamdan Sports Complex
- Location: Dubai, United Arab Emirates

Champions
- Men's singles: (Denmark) Viktor Axelsen
- Women's singles: (Japan) Akane Yamaguchi
- Men's doubles: (Indonesia) Marcus Fernaldi Gideon (Indonesia) Kevin Sanjaya Sukamuljo
- Women's doubles: (Japan) Shiho Tanaka (Japan) Koharu Yonemoto
- Mixed doubles: (China) Zheng Siwei (China) Chen Qingchen

The 2017 BWF Super Series Finals, officially known as Dubai World Superseries Finals 2017, was the season-ending competition of the 2017 BWF Super Series. It was held from 13 to 17 December 2017 in Dubai, United Arab Emirates. This was the last edition of the BWF Super Series Finals, as it has been replaced by the BWF World Tour Finals since 2018.

== Representatives by Nation ==
Top Nations
Rank	Nation	MS	WS	MD	WD	XD	Total	Players
1	China	2	2	2	2	2	10	15^{§}
2	Japan	0	2	2	2	1	7	12
3	Denmark	1	0	2	1	0	4	7
4	Chinese Taipei	1	1	1	1	0	4	6
4	South Korea	1	1	0	2	0	4	6
6	Indonesia	0	0	1	0	2	3	6
7	Hong Kong	1	0	0	0	1	2	3
7	Malaysia	1	0	0	0	1	2	3
8	India	1	1	0	0	0	2	2
9	England	0	0	0	0	1	1	2
10	Thailand	0	1	0	0	0	1	1
Total		8	8	8	8	8	40	63

§: Chen Qingchen from China was the only player who played in two categories (women's doubles and mixed doubles).

== Performance by Nation ==
Nation	Group Phase	Semifinal	Final	Winner
Japan	7	4	3	2
China	10	6	2	1
Denmark	4	3	1	1
Indonesia	3	2	1	1
Hong Kong	2	1	1	
India	2	1	1	
Malaysia	2	1	1	
South Korea	4	1		
Thailand	1	1		
Chinese Taipei	4			
England	1			

== Men's singles ==
=== Seeds ===
1. (South Korea) Son Wan-ho
2. (India) Srikanth Kidambi
3. (China) Shi Yuqi
4. (Malaysia) Lee Chong Wei
5. (Chinese Taipei) Chou Tien-chen
6. (Hong Kong) Ng Ka Long
7. (China) Chen Long
8. (Denmark) Viktor Axelsen

=== Group A ===
Athlete	Pts	Pld	W	L	SF	SA	PF	PA
(Malaysia) Lee Chong Wei	1	2	1	1	3	2	98	83
(South Korea) Son Wan-ho	1	2	1	1	3	3	108	111
(Hong Kong) Ng Ka Long	1	2	1	1	2	3	82	94
(China) Chen Long	Withdrew							

Date		Score		Set 1	Set 2	Set 3
13 Dec	(South Korea) Son Wan-ho	w/o	(China) Chen Long			
13 Dec	(Malaysia) Lee Chong Wei	2–0	(Hong Kong) Ng Ka Long	21–14	21–13	
14 Dec	(Malaysia) Lee Chong Wei	w/o	(China) Chen Long			
14 Dec	(South Korea) Son Wan-ho	1–2	(Hong Kong) Ng Ka Long	15–21	21–13	16–21
15 Dec	(Hong Kong) Ng Ka Long	w/o	(China) Chen Long			
15 Dec	(South Korea) Son Wan-ho	2–1	(Malaysia) Lee Chong Wei	13–21	22–20	21–15

=== Group B ===
Athlete	Pts	Pld	W	L	SF	SA	PF	PA
(China) Shi Yuqi	3	3	3	0	6	2	158	144
(Denmark) Viktor Axelsen	2	3	2	1	5	3	154	137
(Chinese Taipei) Chou Tien-chen	1	3	1	2	3	4	130	134
(India) Srikanth Kidambi	0	3	0	3	1	6	118	145

Date		Score		Set 1	Set 2	Set 3
13 Dec	(China) Shi Yuqi	2–0	(Chinese Taipei) Chou Tien-chen	21–19	21–17	
13 Dec	(India) Srikanth Kidambi	0–2	(Denmark) Viktor Axelsen	13–21	17–21	
14 Dec	(China) Shi Yuqi	2–1	(Denmark) Viktor Axelsen	13–21	21–18	21–17
14 Dec	(India) Srikanth Kidambi	0–2	(Chinese Taipei) Chou Tien-chen	18–21	18–21	
15 Dec	(Chinese Taipei) Chou Tien-chen	1–2	(Denmark) Viktor Axelsen	16–21	21–14	15–21
15 Dec	(India) Srikanth Kidambi	1–2	(China) Shi Yuqi	17–21	21–19	14–21

=== Finals ===
Semifinals
3	(China) Shi Yuqi	12	8
8	(Denmark) Viktor Axelsen	21	21
1	(South Korea) Son Wan-ho	17	11
4	(Malaysia) Lee Chong Wei	21	21

Final
8	(Denmark) Viktor Axelsen	19	21	21
4	(Malaysia) Lee Chong Wei	21	19	15

== Women's singles ==
=== Seeds ===
1. (Japan) Akane Yamaguchi
2. (Chinese Taipei) Tai Tzu-ying
3. (South Korea) Sung Ji-hyun
4. (India) P. V. Sindhu
5. (Thailand) Ratchanok Intanon
6. (China) He Bingjiao
7. (China) Chen Yufei
8. (Japan) Sayaka Sato

=== Withdrawn ===
1. (Japan) Nozomi Okuhara (Wild Card as 2017 World Champion)
2. (Spain) Carolina Marin

=== Group A ===
Athlete	Pts	Pld	W	L	SF	SA	PF	PA
(India) P. V. Sindhu	3	3	3	0	6	1	142	97
(Japan) Akane Yamaguchi	2	3	2	1	4	3	119	116
(Japan) Sayaka Sato	1	3	1	2	2	4	98	118
(China) He Bingjiao	0	3	0	3	2	6	127	155

Date		Score		Set 1	Set 2	Set 3
13 Dec	(Japan) Akane Yamaguchi	2–0	(Japan) Sayaka Sato	21–12	21–19	
13 Dec	(India) P. V. Sindhu	2–1	(China) He Bingjiao	21–11	16–21	21–18
14 Dec	(Japan) Akane Yamaguchi	2–1	(China) He Bingjiao	21–14	13–21	21–8
14 Dec	(India) P. V. Sindhu	2–0	(Japan) Sayaka Sato	21–13	21–12	
15 Dec	(China) He Bingjiao	0–2	(Japan) Sayaka Sato	18–21	16–21	
15 Dec	(Japan) Akane Yamaguchi	0–2	(India) P. V. Sindhu	9–21	13–21	

=== Group B ===
Athlete	Pts	Pld	W	L	SF	SA	PF	PA
(Thailand) Ratchanok Intanon	2	3	2	1	5	2	141	125
(China) Chen Yufei	2	3	2	1	5	3	147	143
(Chinese Taipei) Tai Tzu-ying	2	3	2	1	4	3	134	120
(South Korea) Sung Ji-hyun	0	3	0	3	0	6	92	126

Date		Score		Set 1	Set 2	Set 3
13 Dec	(South Korea) Sung Ji-hyun	0–2	(Thailand) Ratchanok Intanon	19–21	16–21	
13 Dec	(Chinese Taipei) Tai Tzu-ying	2–1	(China) Chen Yufei	15–21	21–12	21–17
14 Dec	(South Korea) Sung Ji-hyun	0–2	(China) Chen Yufei	16–21	13–21	
14 Dec	(Chinese Taipei) Tai Tzu-ying	0–2	(Thailand) Ratchanok Intanon	18–21	17–21	
15 Dec	(Thailand) Ratchanok Intanon	1–2	(China) Chen Yufei	18–21	21–13	18–21
15 Dec	(Chinese Taipei) Tai Tzu-ying	2–0	(South Korea) Sung Ji-hyun	21–17	21–11	

=== Finals ===
Semifinals
4	(India) P. V. Sindhu	21	21
7	(China) Chen Yufei	15	18
1	(Japan) Akane Yamaguchi	17	21	21
5	(Thailand) Ratchanok Intanon	21	12	19

Final
4	(India) P. V. Sindhu	21	12	19
1	(Japan) Akane Yamaguchi	15	21	21

== Men's doubles ==
=== Seeds ===
1. (Indonesia) Marcus Fernaldi Gideon / Kevin Sanjaya Sukamuljo
2. (Denmark) Mathias Boe / Carsten Mogensen
3. (China) Li Junhui / Liu Yuchen
4. (China) Liu Cheng / Zhang Nan
5. (Japan) Takeshi Kamura / Keigo Sonoda
6. (Denmark) Mads Conrad-Petersen / Mads Pieler Kolding
7. (Chinese Taipei) Lee Jhe-huei / Lee Yang
8. (Japan) Takuro Hoki / Yugo Kobayashi

=== Group A ===
Pair	Pts	Pld	W	L	SF	SA	PF	PA
(Japan) Takeshi Kamura (Japan) Keigo Sonoda	3	3	3	0	6	0	126	96
(Indonesia) Marcus Fernaldi Gideon (Indonesia) Kevin Sanjaya Sukamuljo	2	3	2	1	4	3	137	119
(Denmark) Mads Conrad-Petersen (Denmark) Mads Pieler Kolding	1	3	1	2	2	4	92	111
(China) Li Junhui (China) Liu Yuchen	0	3	0	3	1	6	116	145

Date		Score		Set 1	Set 2	Set 3
13 Dec	(Indonesia) Marcus Fernaldi Gideon (Indonesia) Kevin Sanjaya Sukamuljo	2–0	(Denmark) Mads Conrad-Petersen (Denmark) Mads Pieler Kolding	21–6	21–16	
13 Dec	(China) Li Junhui (China) Liu Yuchen	0–2	(Japan) Takeshi Kamura (Japan) Keigo Sonoda	17–21	17–21	
14 Dec	(China) Li Junhui (China) Liu Yuchen	0–2	(Denmark) Mads Conrad-Petersen (Denmark) Mads Pieler Kolding	14–21	13–21	
14 Dec	(Indonesia) Marcus Fernaldi Gideon (Indonesia) Kevin Sanjaya Sukamuljo	0–2	(Japan) Takeshi Kamura (Japan) Keigo Sonoda	17–21	17–21	
15 Dec	(Japan) Takeshi Kamura (Japan) Keigo Sonoda	2–0	(Denmark) Mads Conrad-Petersen (Denmark) Mads Pieler Kolding	21–9	21–19	
15 Dec	(Indonesia) Marcus Fernaldi Gideon (Indonesia) Kevin Sanjaya Sukamuljo	2–1	(China) Li Junhui (China) Liu Yuchen	19–21	21–16	21–18

=== Group B ===
Pair	Pts	Pld	W	L	SF	SA	PF	PA
(China) Liu Cheng (China) Zhang Nan	3	3	3	0	6	1	150	123
(Denmark) Mathias Boe (Denmark) Carsten Mogensen	2	3	2	1	4	2	115	107
(Chinese Taipei) Lee Jhe-huei (Chinese Taipei) Lee Yang	1	3	1	2	3	5	149	160
(Japan) Takuro Hoki (Japan) Yugo Kobayashi	0	3	0	3	1	6	117	141

Date		Score		Set 1	Set 2	Set 3
13 Dec	(China) Liu Cheng (China) Zhang Nan	2–1	(Chinese Taipei) Lee Jhe-huei (Chinese Taipei) Lee Yang	21–19	24–26	21–14
13 Dec	(Denmark) Mathias Boe (Denmark) Carsten Mogensen	2–0	(Japan) Takuro Hoki (Japan) Yugo Kobayashi	21–18	21–14	
14 Dec	(China) Liu Cheng (China) Zhang Nan	2–0	(Japan) Takuro Hoki (Japan) Yugo Kobayashi	21–18	21–15	
14 Dec	(Denmark) Mathias Boe (Denmark) Carsten Mogensen	2–0	(Chinese Taipei) Lee Jhe-huei (Chinese Taipei) Lee Yang	21–14	21–19	
15 Dec	(Chinese Taipei) Lee Jhe-huei (Chinese Taipei) Lee Yang	2–1	(Japan) Takuro Hoki (Japan) Yugo Kobayashi	15–21	21–15	21–16
15 Dec	(Denmark) Mathias Boe (Denmark) Carsten Mogensen	0–2	(China) Liu Cheng (China) Zhang Nan	18–21	13–21	

=== Finals ===
Semifinals
5	(Japan) Takeshi Kamura (Japan) Keigo Sonoda	10	21	16
1	(Indonesia) Marcus Fernaldi Gideon (Indonesia) Kevin Sanjaya Sukamuljo	21	18	21
2	(Denmark) Mathias Boe (Denmark) Carsten Mogensen	17	16
4	(China) Liu Cheng (China) Zhang Nan	21	21

Final
1	(Indonesia) Marcus Fernaldi Gideon (Indonesia) Kevin Sanjaya Sukamuljo	21	21
4	(China) Liu Cheng (China) Zhang Nan	16	15

== Women's doubles ==
=== Seeds ===
1. (Japan) Shiho Tanaka / Koharu Yonemoto
2. (Japan) Yuki Fukushima / Sayaka Hirota
3. (China) Chen Qingchen / Jia Yifan
4. (Denmark) Kamilla Rytter Juhl / Christinna Pedersen
5. (South Korea) Chang Ye-na / Lee So-hee
6. (South Korea) Jung Kyung-eun / Shin Seung-chan
7. (China) Huang Yaqiong / Yu Xiaohan
8. (Chinese Taipei) Hsu Ya-ching / Wu Ti-jung

=== Group A ===
Pair	Pts	Pld	W	L	SF	SA	PF	PA
(Japan) Shiho Tanaka (Japan) Koharu Yonemoto	2	3	2	1	4	2	110	104
(China) Huang Yaqiong (China) Yu Xiaohan	2	3	2	1	4	3	132	122
(China) Chen Qingchen (China) Jia Yifan	1	3	1	2	3	4	126	131
(South Korea) Chang Ye-na (South Korea) Lee So-hee	1	3	1	2	2	4	99	110

Date		Score		Set 1	Set 2	Set 3
13 Dec	(Japan) Shiho Tanaka (Japan) Koharu Yonemoto	0–2	(South Korea) Chang Ye-na (South Korea) Lee So-hee	16–21	10–21	
13 Dec	(China) Chen Qingchen (China) Jia Yifan	1–2	(China) Huang Yaqiong (China) Yu Xiaohan	14–21	21–16	19–21
14 Dec	(Japan) Shiho Tanaka (Japan) Koharu Yonemoto	2–0	(China) Huang Yaqiong (China) Yu Xiaohan	21–16	21–16	
14 Dec	(China) Chen Qingchen (China) Jia Yifan	2–0	(South Korea) Chang Ye-na (South Korea) Lee So-hee	21–14	21–17	
15 Dec	(South Korea) Chang Ye-na (South Korea) Lee So-hee	0–2	(China) Huang Yaqiong (China) Yu Xiaohan	12–21	14–21	
15 Dec	(Japan) Shiho Tanaka (Japan) Koharu Yonemoto	2–0	(China) Chen Qingchen (China) Jia Yifan	21–15	21–15	

=== Group B ===
Pair	Pts	Pld	W	L	SF	SA	PF	PA
(Japan) Yuki Fukushima (Japan) Sayaka Hirota	3	3	3	0	6	0	126	81
(Denmark) Kamilla Rytter Juhl (Denmark) Christinna Pedersen	2	3	2	1	4	3	128	122
(South Korea) Jung Kyung-eun (South Korea) Shin Seung-chan	1	3	1	2	2	5	118	125
(Chinese Taipei) Hsu Ya-ching (Chinese Taipei) Wu Ti-jung	0	3	0	3	2	6	119	163

Date		Score		Set 1	Set 2	Set 3
13 Dec	(Japan) Yuki Fukushima (Japan) Sayaka Hirota	2–0	(Chinese Taipei) Hsu Ya-ching (Chinese Taipei) Wu Ti-jung	21–13	21–13	
13 Dec	(Denmark) Kamilla Rytter Juhl (Denmark) Christinna Pedersen	2–0	(South Korea) Jung Kyung-eun (South Korea) Shin Seung-chan	21–18	21–10	
14 Dec	(Japan) Yuki Fukushima (Japan) Sayaka Hirota	2–0	(South Korea) Jung Kyung-eun (South Korea) Shin Seung-chan	21–18	21–13	
14 Dec	(Denmark) Kamilla Rytter Juhl (Denmark) Christinna Pedersen	2–1	(Chinese Taipei) Hsu Ya-ching (Chinese Taipei) Wu Ti-jung	20–22	21–13	21–17
15 Dec	(South Korea) Jung Kyung-eun (South Korea) Shin Seung-chan	2–1	(Chinese Taipei) Hsu Ya-ching (Chinese Taipei) Wu Ti-jung	21–9	17–21	21–11
15 Dec	(Japan) Yuki Fukushima (Japan) Sayaka Hirota	2–0	(Denmark) Kamilla Rytter Juhl (Denmark) Christinna Pedersen	21–12	21–12	

=== Finals ===
Semifinals
2	(Japan) Yuki Fukushima (Japan) Sayaka Hirota	21	21
7	(China) Huang Yaqiong (China) Yu Xiaohan	13	14
4	(Denmark) Kamilla Rytter Juhl (Denmark) Christinna Pedersen	19	19
1	(Japan) Shiho Tanaka (Japan) Koharu Yonemoto	21	21

Final
2	(Japan) Yuki Fukushima (Japan) Sayaka Hirota	16	15
1	(Japan) Shiho Tanaka (Japan) Koharu Yonemoto	21	21

== Mixed doubles ==
=== Seeds ===
1. (China) Zheng Siwei / Chen Qingchen
2. (China) Wang Yilu / Huang Dongping
3. (Indonesia) Tontowi Ahmad / Liliyana Natsir
4. (Hong Kong) Tang Chun Man / Tse Ying Suet
5. (Indonesia) Praveen Jordan / Debby Susanto
6. (England) Chris Adcock / Gabrielle Adcock
7. (Malaysia) Tan Kian Meng / Lai Pei Jing
8. (Japan) Kenta Kazuno / Ayane Kurihara

=== Withdrawn ===
1. (China) Lu Kai / Huang Yaqiong

=== Group A ===
Pair	Pts	Pld	W	L	SF	SA	PF	PA
(China) Zheng Siwei (China) Chen Qingchen	3	3	3	0	6	1	145	105
(Hong Kong) Tang Chun Man (Hong Kong) Tse Ying Suet	2	3	2	1	4	4	142	135
(Japan) Kenta Kazuno (Japan) Ayane Kurihara	1	3	1	2	3	4	113	130
(Indonesia) Praveen Jordan (Indonesia) Debby Susanto	0	3	0	3	2	6	129	159

Date		Score		Set 1	Set 2	Set 3
13 Dec	(Hong Kong) Tang Chun Man (Hong Kong) Tse Ying Suet	2–1	(Indonesia) Praveen Jordan (Indonesia) Debby Susanto	21–13	14–21	21–16
13 Dec	(China) Zheng Siwei (China) Chen Qingchen	2–0	(Japan) Kenta Kazuno (Japan) Ayane Kurihara	21–16	21–12	
14 Dec	(Hong Kong) Tang Chun Man (Hong Kong) Tse Ying Suet	2–1	(Japan) Kenta Kazuno (Japan) Ayane Kurihara	21–16	16–21	21–6
14 Dec	(China) Zheng Siwei (China) Chen Qingchen	2–1	(Indonesia) Praveen Jordan (Indonesia) Debby Susanto	21–12	19–21	21–16
15 Dec	(Indonesia) Praveen Jordan (Indonesia) Debby Susanto	0–2	(Japan) Kenta Kazuno (Japan) Ayane Kurihara	13–21	17–21	
15 Dec	(China) Zheng Siwei (China) Chen Qingchen	2–0	(Hong Kong) Tang Chun Man (Hong Kong) Tse Ying Suet	21–10	21–18	

=== Group B ===
Pair	Pts	Pld	W	L	SF	SA	PF	PA
(China) Wang Yilu (China) Huang Dongping	3	3	3	0	6	1	137	95
(Indonesia) Tontowi Ahmad (Indonesia) Liliyana Natsir	2	3	2	1	5	3	143	142
(England) Chris Adcock (England) Gabrielle Adcock	1	3	1	2	3	4	126	131
(Malaysia) Tan Kian Meng (Malaysia) Lai Pei Jing	0	3	0	3	0	6	88	126

Date		Score		Set 1	Set 2	Set 3
13 Dec	(China) Wang Yilu (China) Huang Dongping	2–0	(Malaysia) Tan Kian Meng (Malaysia) Lai Pei Jing	21–12	21–11	
13 Dec	(Indonesia) Tontowi Ahmad (Indonesia) Liliyana Natsir	2–1	(England) Chris Adcock (England) Gabrielle Adcock	21–18	18–21	21–14
14 Dec	(China) Wang Yilu (China) Huang Dongping	2–0	(England) Chris Adcock (England) Gabrielle Adcock	21–14	21–17	
14 Dec	(Indonesia) Tontowi Ahmad (Indonesia) Liliyana Natsir	2–0	(Malaysia) Tan Kian Meng (Malaysia) Lai Pei Jing	21–17	21–19	
15 Dec	(England) Chris Adcock (England) Gabrielle Adcock	2–0	(Malaysia) Tan Kian Meng (Malaysia) Lai Pei Jing	21–13	21–16	
15 Dec	(China) Wang Yilu (China) Huang Dongping	2–1	(Indonesia) Tontowi Ahmad (Indonesia) Liliyana Natsir	21–9	11–21	21–11

=== Finals ===
Semifinals
2	(China) Wang Yilu (China) Huang Dongping	21	18	17
4	(Hong Kong) Tang Chun Man (Hong Kong) Tse Ying Suet	18	21	21
3	(Indonesia) Tontowi Ahmad (Indonesia) Liliyana Natsir	12	17
1	(China) Zheng Siwei (China) Chen Qingchen	21	21

Final
4	(Hong Kong) Tang Chun Man (Hong Kong) Tse Ying Suet	15	20
1	(China) Zheng Siwei (China) Chen Qingchen	21	22

Preceded by 2016 BWF Super Series Finals	BWF Super Series Finals	Succeeded by 2018 BWF World Tour Finals
Preceded by 2017 Hong Kong Super Series	BWF Super Series; 2017 BWF Season	Succeeded by 2018 Thailand Masters
