= 2017 BWF Super Series =

Tournament details
- Dates: 7 March – 17 December
- Edition: 11th

The 2017 BWF Super Series, officially known as 2017 Metlife BWF Super Series for sponsorship reasons, was the eleventh season of the BWF Super Series of badminton. It was replaced by the BWF World Tour from the 2018 season.

== Schedule ==
Below is the schedule released by the Badminton World Federation:

Tour	Official title	Venue	City	Date		Prize money USD	Report
Tour	Official title	Venue	City	Start	Finish	Prize money USD	Report
1	All England Super Series Premier	Arena Birmingham	Birmingham	March 7	March 12	600,000	Report
2	India Super Series	Siri Fort Sports Complex	New Delhi	March 28	April 2	350,000	Report
3	Malaysia Open Super Series Premier	Stadium Perpaduan	Kuching	April 4	April 9	600,000	Report
4	Singapore Super Series	Singapore Indoor Stadium	Singapore	April 11	April 16	350,000	Report
5	Indonesia Open Super Series Premier	Jakarta Convention Center	Jakarta	June 13	June 18	1,000,000	Report
6	(Australia) Australian Super Series	State Sports Centre	Sydney	June 20	June 25	750,000	Report
7	(South Korea) Korea Super Series	SK Handball Stadium	Seoul	September 12	September 17	600,000	Report
8	Japan Super Series	Tokyo Metropolitan Gymnasium	Tokyo	September 19	September 24	325,000	Report
9	Denmark Super Series Premier	Odense Sports Park	Odense	October 17	October 22	750,000	Report
10	(France) French Super Series	Stade Pierre de Coubertin	Paris	October 24	October 29	325,000	Report
11	China Open Super Series Premier	Haixia Olympic Sports Center	Fuzhou	November 14	November 19	700,000	Report
12	Hong Kong Super Series	Hong Kong Coliseum	Kowloon	November 21	November 26	400,000	Report
13	(United Arab Emirates) Super Series Finals	Hamdan Sports Complex	Dubai	December 13	December 17	1,000,000	Report

Super Series Premier
Super Series Finals

== Results ==
=== Winners ===
Tour	Men's singles	Women's singles	Men's doubles	Women's doubles	Mixed doubles
England	(Malaysia) Lee Chong Wei	(Chinese Taipei) Tai Tzu-ying	(Indonesia) Marcus Fernaldi Gideon (Indonesia) Kevin Sanjaya Sukamuljo	(South Korea) Chang Ye-na (South Korea) Lee So-hee	(China) Lu Kai (China) Huang Yaqiong
India	(Denmark) Viktor Axelsen	(India) P. V. Sindhu	(Indonesia) Marcus Fernaldi Gideon (Indonesia) Kevin Sanjaya Sukamuljo	(Japan) Shiho Tanaka (Japan) Koharu Yonemoto	(China) Lu Kai (China) Huang Yaqiong
Malaysia	(China) Lin Dan	(Chinese Taipei) Tai Tzu-ying	(Indonesia) Marcus Fernaldi Gideon (Indonesia) Kevin Sanjaya Sukamuljo	(Japan) Yuki Fukushima (Japan) Sayaka Hirota	(China) Zheng Siwei (China) Chen Qingchen
Singapore	(India) B. Sai Praneeth	(Chinese Taipei) Tai Tzu-ying	(Denmark) Mathias Boe (Denmark) Carsten Mogensen	(Denmark) Kamilla Rytter Juhl (Denmark) Christinna Pedersen	(China) Lu Kai (China) Huang Yaqiong
Indonesia	(India) Srikanth Kidambi	(Japan) Sayaka Sato	(China) Li Junhui (China) Liu Yuchen	(China) Chen Qingchen (China) Jia Yifan	(Indonesia) Tontowi Ahmad (Indonesia) Liliyana Natsir
Australia	(India) Srikanth Kidambi	(Japan) Nozomi Okuhara	(Japan) Takeshi Kamura (Japan) Keigo Sonoda	(Japan) Misaki Matsutomo (Japan) Ayaka Takahashi	(China) Zheng Siwei (China) Chen Qingchen
(South Korea) Korea	(Indonesia) Anthony Sinisuka Ginting	(India) P. V. Sindhu	(Denmark) Mathias Boe (Denmark) Carsten Mogensen	(China) Huang Yaqiong (China) Yu Xiaohan	(Indonesia) Praveen Jordan (Indonesia) Debby Susanto
Japan	(Denmark) Viktor Axelsen	(Spain) Carolina Marín	(Indonesia) Marcus Fernaldi Gideon (Indonesia) Kevin Sanjaya Sukamuljo	(Japan) Misaki Matsutomo (Japan) Ayaka Takahashi	(China) Wang Yilu (China) Huang Dongping
Denmark	(India) Srikanth Kidambi	(Thailand) Ratchanok Intanon	(China) Liu Cheng (China) Zhang Nan	(South Korea) Lee So-hee (South Korea) Shin Seung-chan	(Hong Kong) Tang Chun Man (Hong Kong) Tse Ying Suet
France	(India) Srikanth Kidambi	(Chinese Taipei) Tai Tzu-ying	(Chinese Taipei) Lee Jhe-huei (Chinese Taipei) Lee Yang	(Indonesia) Greysia Polii (Indonesia) Apriyani Rahayu	(Indonesia) Tontowi Ahmad (Indonesia) Liliyana Natsir
China	(China) Chen Long	(Japan) Akane Yamaguchi	(Indonesia) Marcus Fernaldi Gideon (Indonesia) Kevin Sanjaya Sukamuljo	(China) Chen Qingchen (China) Jia Yifan	(China) Zheng Siwei (China) Huang Yaqiong
Hong Kong	(Malaysia) Lee Chong Wei	(Chinese Taipei) Tai Tzu-ying	(Indonesia) Marcus Fernaldi Gideon (Indonesia) Kevin Sanjaya Sukamuljo	(China) Chen Qingchen (China) Jia Yifan	(China) Zheng Siwei (China) Huang Yaqiong
(United Arab Emirates) Finals	(Denmark) Viktor Axelsen	(Japan) Akane Yamaguchi	(Indonesia) Marcus Fernaldi Gideon (Indonesia) Kevin Sanjaya Sukamuljo	(Japan) Shiho Tanaka (Japan) Koharu Yonemoto	(China) Zheng Siwei (China) Chen Qingchen

=== Performance by countries ===
Tabulated below are the Super Series performances based on countries. Only countries who have won a title are listed:

Team	ENG	IND	MAS	SIN	INA	AUS	KOR	JPN	DEN	FRA	CHN	HKG	SSF	Total
China	1	1	2	1	2	1	1	1	1		3	2	1	17
Indonesia	1	1	1		1		2	1		2	1	1	1	12
Japan		1	1		1	3		1			1		2	10
India		1		1	1	1	1		1	1				7
Chinese Taipei	1		1	1						2		1		6
Denmark		1		2			1	1					1	6
Korea	1								1					2
Malaysia	1											1		2
Hong Kong									1					1
Spain								1						1
Thailand									1					1

== Finals ==
=== All England ===
Category	Winners	Runners-up	Score
Men's singles	(Malaysia) Lee Chong Wei	(China) Shi Yuqi	21–12, 21–10
Women's singles	(Chinese Taipei) Tai Tzu-ying	(Thailand) Ratchanok Intanon	21–16, 22–20
Men's doubles	(Indonesia) Marcus Fernaldi Gideon / Kevin Sanjaya Sukamuljo	(China) Li Junhui / Liu Yuchen	21–19, 21–14
Women's doubles	(South Korea) Chang Ye-na / Lee So-hee	(Denmark) Kamilla Rytter Juhl / Christinna Pedersen	21–18, 21–13
Mixed doubles	(China) Lu Kai / Huang Yaqiong	(Malaysia) Chan Peng Soon / Goh Liu Ying	18–21, 21–19, 21–16

=== India ===
Category	Winners	Runners-up	Score
Men's singles	(Denmark) Viktor Axelsen	(Chinese Taipei) Chou Tien-chen	21–13, 21–10
Women's singles	(India) P. V. Sindhu	(Spain) Carolina Marín	21–19, 21–16
Men's doubles	(Indonesia) Marcus Fernaldi Gideon / Kevin Sanjaya Sukamuljo	(Indonesia) Angga Pratama / Ricky Karanda Suwardi	21–11, 21–15
Women's doubles	(Japan) Shiho Tanaka / Koharu Yonemoto	(Japan) Naoko Fukuman / Kurumi Yonao	16–21, 21–19, 21–10
Mixed doubles	(China) Lu Kai / Huang Yaqiong	(China) Zheng Siwei / Chen Qingchen	22–24, 21–14, 21–17

=== Malaysia ===
Category	Winners	Runners-up	Score
Men's singles	(China) Lin Dan	(Malaysia) Lee Chong Wei	21–19, 21–14
Women's singles	(Chinese Taipei) Tai Tzu-ying	(Spain) Carolina Marín	23–25, 22–20, 21–13
Men's doubles	(Indonesia) Marcus Fernaldi Gideon / Kevin Sanjaya Sukamuljo	(China) Fu Haifeng / Zheng Siwei	21–14, 14–21, 21–12
Women's doubles	(Japan) Yuki Fukushima / Sayaka Hirota	(China) Huang Yaqiong / Tang Jinhua	21–17, 18–21, 21–12
Mixed doubles	(China) Zheng Siwei / Chen Qingchen	(China) Lu Kai / Huang Yaqiong	21–15, 21–18

=== Singapore ===
Category	Winners	Runners-up	Score
Men's singles	(India) Sai Praneeth Bhamidipati	(India) Srikanth Kidambi	17–21, 21–17, 21–12
Women's singles	(Chinese Taipei) Tai Tzu-ying	(Spain) Carolina Marín	21–15, 21–15
Men's doubles	(Denmark) Mathias Boe / Carsten Mogensen	(China) Li Junhui / Liu Yuchen	21–13, 21–14
Women's doubles	(Denmark) Kamilla Rytter Juhl / Christinna Pedersen	(Japan) Misaki Matsutomo / Ayaka Takahashi	21–18, 14–21, 21–15
Mixed doubles	(China) Lu Kai / Huang Yaqiong	(Thailand) Dechapol Puavaranukroh / Sapsiree Taerattanachai	19–21, 21–16, 21–11

=== Indonesia ===
Category	Winners	Runners-up	Score
Men's singles	(India) Srikanth Kidambi	(Japan) Kazumasa Sakai	21–11, 21–19
Women's singles	(Japan) Sayaka Sato	(South Korea) Sung Ji-hyun	21–13, 17–21, 21–14
Men's doubles	(China) Li Junhui / Liu Yuchen	(Denmark) Mathias Boe / Carsten Mogensen	21–19, 19–21, 21–18
Women's doubles	(China) Chen Qingchen / Jia Yifan	(South Korea) Chang Ye-na / Lee So-hee	21–19, 15–21, 21–10
Mixed doubles	(Indonesia) Tontowi Ahmad / Liliyana Natsir	(China) Zheng Siwei / Chen Qingchen	22–20, 21–15

=== Australia ===
Category	Winners	Runners-up	Score
Men's singles	(India) Srikanth Kidambi	(China) Chen Long	22–20, 21–16
Women's singles	(Japan) Nozomi Okuhara	(Japan) Akane Yamaguchi	21–12, 21–23, 21–17
Men's doubles	(Japan) Takeshi Kamura / Keigo Sonoda	(Indonesia) Hendra Setiawan / (Malaysia) Tan Boon Heong	21–17, 21–19
Women's doubles	(Japan) Misaki Matsutomo / Ayaka Takahashi	(Denmark) Kamilla Rytter Juhl / Christinna Pedersen	21–10, 21–13
Mixed doubles	(China) Zheng Siwei / Chen Qingchen	(Indonesia) Praveen Jordan / Debby Susanto	18–21, 21–14, 21–17

=== Korea ===
Category	Winners	Runners-up	Score
Men's singles	(Indonesia) Anthony Sinisuka Ginting	(Indonesia) Jonatan Christie	21–13, 19–21, 22–20
Women's singles	(India) P. V. Sindhu	(Japan) Nozomi Okuhara	22–20, 11–21, 21–18
Men's doubles	(Denmark) Mathias Boe / Carsten Mogensen	(Indonesia) Marcus Fernaldi Gideon / Kevin Sanjaya Sukamuljo	21–19, 19–21, 21–15
Women's doubles	(China) Huang Yaqiong / Yu Xiaohan	(South Korea) Chang Ye-na / Lee So-hee	21–11, 21–15
Mixed doubles	(Indonesia) Praveen Jordan / Debby Susanto	(China) Wang Yilu / Huang Dongping	21–17, 21–18

=== Japan ===
Category	Winners	Runners-up	Score
Men's singles	(Denmark) Viktor Axelsen	(Malaysia) Lee Chong Wei	21–14, 19–21, 21–14
Women's singles	(Spain) Carolina Marín	(China) He Bingjiao	23–21, 21–12
Men's doubles	(Indonesia) Marcus Fernaldi Gideon / Kevin Sanjaya Sukamuljo	(Japan) Takuto Inoue / Yuki Kaneko	21–12, 21–15
Women's doubles	(Japan) Misaki Matsutomo / Ayaka Takahashi	(South Korea) Kim Ha-na / Kong Hee-yong	21–18, 21–16
Mixed doubles	(China) Wang Yilu / Huang Dongping	(Japan) Takuro Hoki / Sayaka Hirota	21–13, 21–8

=== Denmark ===
Category	Winners	Runners-up	Score
Men's singles	(India) Srikanth Kidambi	(South Korea) Lee Hyun-il	21–10, 21–5
Women's singles	(Thailand) Ratchanok Intanon	(Japan) Akane Yamaguchi	14–21, 21–15, 21–19
Men's doubles	(China) Liu Cheng / Zhang Nan	(Indonesia) Marcus Fernaldi Gideon / Kevin Sanjaya Sukamuljo	21–16, 22–24, 21–19
Women's doubles	(South Korea) Lee So-hee / Shin Seung-chan	(Japan) Shiho Tanaka / Koharu Yonemoto	21–13, 21–16
Mixed doubles	(Hong Kong) Tang Chun Man / Tse Ying Suet	(China) Zheng Siwei / Chen Qingchen	24–22, 19–21, 23–21

=== France ===
Category	Winners	Runners-up	Score
Men's singles	(India) Srikanth Kidambi	(Japan) Kenta Nishimoto	21–14, 21–13
Women's singles	(Chinese Taipei) Tai Tzu-ying	(Japan) Akane Yamaguchi	21–4, 21–16
Men's doubles	(Chinese Taipei) Lee Jhe-huei / Lee Yang	(Denmark) Mathias Boe / Carsten Mogensen	21–19, 23–21
Women's doubles	(Indonesia) Greysia Polii / Apriyani Rahayu	(South Korea) Lee So-hee / Shin Seung-chan	21–17, 21–15
Mixed doubles	(Indonesia) Tontowi Ahmad / Liliyana Natsir	(China) Zheng Siwei / Chen Qingchen	22–20, 21–15

=== China ===
Category	Winners	Runners-up	Score
Men's singles	(China) Chen Long	(Denmark) Viktor Axelsen	21–16, 14–21, 21–13
Women's singles	(Japan) Akane Yamaguchi	(China) Gao Fangjie	21–13, 21–15
Men's doubles	(Indonesia) Marcus Fernaldi Gideon / Kevin Sanjaya Sukamuljo	(Denmark) Mathias Boe / Carsten Mogensen	21–19, 21–11
Women's doubles	(China) Chen Qingchen / Jia Yifan	(South Korea) Kim Hye-rin / Lee So-hee	21–7, 18–21, 21–14
Mixed doubles	(China) Zheng Siwei / Huang Yaqiong	(Denmark) Mathias Christiansen / Christinna Pedersen	21–15, 21–11

=== Hong Kong ===
Category	Winners	Runners-up	Score
Men's singles	(Malaysia) Lee Chong Wei	(China) Chen Long	21–14, 21–19
Women's singles	(Chinese Taipei) Tai Tzu-ying	(India) P. V. Sindhu	21-18, 21-18
Men's doubles	(Indonesia) Marcus Fernaldi Gideon / Kevin Sanjaya Sukamuljo	(Denmark) Mads Conrad-Petersen / Mads Pieler Kolding	21–12, 21–18
Women's doubles	(China) Chen Qingchen / Jia Yifan	(Indonesia) Greysia Polii / Apriyani Rahayu	14–21, 21–16, 21–15
Mixed doubles	(China) Zheng Siwei / Huang Yaqiong	(Denmark) Mathias Christiansen / Christinna Pedersen	21–15, 21–13

=== Finals ===
Category	Winners	Runners-up	Score
Men's singles	(Denmark) Viktor Axelsen	(Malaysia) Lee Chong Wei	19–21, 21–19, 21–15
Women's singles	(Japan) Akane Yamaguchi	(India) P. V. Sindhu	15–21, 21–12, 21–19
Men's doubles	(Indonesia) Marcus Fernaldi Gideon / Kevin Sanjaya Sukamuljo	(China) Liu Cheng / Zhang Nan	21–16, 21–15
Women's doubles	(Japan) Shiho Tanaka / Koharu Yonemoto	(Japan) Yuki Fukushima / Sayaka Hirota	21–16, 21–15
Mixed doubles	(China) Zheng Siwei / Chen Qingchen	(Hong Kong) Tang Chun Man / Tse Ying Suet	21–15, 22–20
