= 2017 India Super Series =

Tournament details
- Dates: 28 March–2 April 2017
- Level: Super Series
- Total prize money: US$350,000
- Venue: Siri Fort Indoor Stadium
- Location: New Delhi, India

Champions
- Men's singles: (Denmark) Viktor Axelsen
- Women's singles: (India) P. V. Sindhu
- Men's doubles: (Indonesia) Marcus Fernaldi Gideon (Indonesia) Kevin Sanjaya Sukamuljo
- Women's doubles: (Japan) Shiho Tanaka (Japan) Koharu Yonemoto
- Mixed doubles: (China) Lu Kai (China) Huang Yaqiong

The 2017 India Super Series was the second super series tournament of the 2017 BWF Super Series. The tournament took place in Siri Fort Sports Complex, New Delhi, India from 28 March – 2 April 2017 and had a total purse of $350,000.

== Men's singles ==
=== Seeds ===
1. (Malaysia) Lee Chong Wei (withdrew)
2. (Denmark) Jan Ø. Jørgensen (withdrew)
3. (Denmark) Viktor Axelsen (champion)
4. (South Korea) Son Wan-ho (first round)
5. (China) Tian Houwei (second round)
6. (Hong Kong) Ng Ka Long Angus (semifinals)
7. (Chinese Taipei) Chou Tien-chen (final)
8. (Germany) Marc Zwiebler (second round)

=== Top half ===
First Round
PFQ	(Denmark) E Holst	15	18
(Denmark) H-K Vittinghus	21	21
(South Korea) Lee D-k	27	21
PFQ	(Japan) K Tsuneyama	25	10
7	(Chinese Taipei) Chou T-c	21	21
(Thailand) T Saensomboonsuk	18	8
Q2	(Japan) K Nishimoto	21	12	19
(India) B. S Praneeth	16	21	21
4	(South Korea) Son W-h	17	10
(India) S Verma	21	21
(France) B Leverdez	18	13
(Hong Kong) Hu Y	21	21
8	(Germany) M Zwiebler	21	21
(Chinese Taipei) Hsu J-h	14	17
Q4	(Japan) K Sakai	10	16
(India) DHILLON	21	21

Second Round
(Denmark) H-K Vittinghus	21	21
(South Korea) Lee D-k	19	16
7	(Chinese Taipei) Chou T-c	21	21
(India) B. S Praneeth	14	16
(India) S Verma	21	21
(Hong Kong) Hu Y	17	15
8	(Germany) M Zwiebler
(Denmark) A Antonsen	w	/	o

Quarterfinals
(Denmark) H-K Vittinghus	10	14
7	(Chinese Taipei) Chou T-c	21	21
(India) S Verma	22	19
(Denmark) A Antonsen	24	21

Semifinals
7	(Chinese Taipei) Chou T-c	21	21
(Denmark) A Antonsen	17	14

=== Bottom half ===
First Round
(Hong Kong) Wong W K	12	19
(Chinese Taipei) Wang T-w	21	21
(Hong Kong) Wei N	12	19
5	(China) Tian HW	21	21
(India) S Kidambi	21	21
Q1	(China) Zhao JP	19	16
(India) A Jayaram	21	17
3	(Denmark) V Axelsen	23	21
(India) H. S. Prannoy	13	16
PFQ	(India) S Verma	21	21
(England) R Ouseph
6	(Hong Kong) Ng K L	w	/	o
Q3	(South Korea) Jeon H-j	21	17	19
(China) Huang YX	17	21	21
(Indonesia) T Sugiarto	21	21
PFQ	(Israel) M Zilberman	17	15

Second Round
(Chinese Taipei) Wang T-w	21	21
5	(China) Tian HW	14	12
(India) S Kidambi	7	12
3	(Denmark) V Axelsen	21	21
PFQ	(India) S Verma	19	21	20
6	(Hong Kong) Ng K L	21	14	22
(China) Huang YX	11	21	15
(Indonesia) T Sugiarto	21	11	21

Quarterfinals
(Chinese Taipei) Wang T-w	21	14	16
3	(Denmark) V Axelsen	19	21	21
6	(Hong Kong) Ng K L	10	21	21
(Indonesia) T Sugiarto	21	15	19

Semifinals
3	(Denmark) V Axelsen	21	21
6	(Hong Kong) Ng K L	12	13

=== Finals ===
Semifinals
7	(Chinese Taipei) Chou Tien-chen	21	21
(Denmark) Anders Antonsen	17	14
3	(Denmark) Viktor Axelsen	21	21
6	(Hong Kong) Ng Ka Long	12	13

Final
7	(Chinese Taipei) Chou Tien-chen	13	10
3	(Denmark) Viktor Axelsen	21	21

== Women's singles ==
=== Seeds ===
1. (Spain) Carolina Marín (final)
2. (South Korea) Sung Ji-Hyun (semifinals)
3. (India) P. V. Sindhu (champion)
4. (Japan) Akane Yamaguchi (semifinals)
5. (Thailand) Ratchanok Intanon (quarterfinals)
6. (India) Saina Nehwal (quarterfinals)
7. (Japan) Nozomi Okuhara (quarterfinals)
8. (Thailand) Busanan Ongbamrungphan (first round)

=== Top half ===
First Round
1	(Spain) C Marín	21	21
(South Korea) Kim H-m	17	10
(India) R Das	19	21	21
(Chinese Taipei) Chiang M-h	21	15	19
8	(Thailand) B Ongbamrungphan	21	16	15
(China) Chen XX	17	21	21
(Japan) M Mitani	21	21
(Denmark) L Kjaersfeldt	16	8
4	(Japan) A Yamaguchi	21	21
PFQ	(India) P. C. Thulasi	15	16
Q3	(India) S U Rao	17	18
(Indonesia) L A Mainaky	21	21
7	(Japan) N Okuhara	6
(India) T Lad	2^{r}
Q2	(India) A Prabhudesai	17	16
(Japan) S Sato	21	21

Second Round
1	(Spain) C Marín	21	21
(India) R Das	13	11
(China) Chen XX	15	13
(Japan) M Mitani	21	21
4	(Japan) A Yamaguchi	21	21
(Indonesia) L A Mainaky	16	13
7	(Japan) N Okuhara	21	9	21
(Japan) S Sato	12	21	18

Quarterfinals
1	(Spain) C Marín	21	20	21
(Japan) M Mitani	10	22	14
4	(Japan) A Yamaguchi	21	11	21
7	(Japan) N Okuhara	13	21	18

Semifinals
1	(Spain) C Marín	21	21
4	(Japan) A Yamaguchi	16	14

=== Bottom half ===
First Round
(Chinese Taipei) Hsu Y-c	16	13
(Thailand) P Chochuwong	21	21
(Chinese Taipei) Lee C-h	10	17
6	(India) S Nehwal	21	21
(Japan) S Kawakami	21	21
Q1	(India) R Raje	10	12
PFQ	(India) A Pantawane	17	6
3	(India) P. V. Sindhu	21	21
PFQ	(India) R Karthik	9	8
(China) Zhang YM	21	21
(China) Gao FJ	15	19
5	(Thailand) R Intanon	21	21
(Bulgaria) L Zetchiri	21	21
Q4	(India) P Shreyanshi	14	18
(India) S K P Kudaravalli	11	13
2	(South Korea) Sung J-h	21	21

Second Round
(Thailand) P Chochuwong	14	12
6	(India) S Nehwal	21	21
(Japan) S Kawakami	16	21
3	(India) P. V. Sindhu	21	23
(China) Zhang YM	14	19
5	(Thailand) R Intanon	21	21
(Bulgaria) L Zetchiri	6	8
2	(South Korea) Sung J-h	21	21

Quarterfinals
6	(India) S Nehwal	16	20
3	(India) P. V. Sindhu	21	22
5	(Thailand) R Intanon	16	20
2	(South Korea) Sung J-h	21	22

Semifinals
3	(India) P. V. Sindhu	21	14	21
2	(South Korea) Sung J-h	18	21	14

=== Finals ===
Semifinals
1	(Spain) Carolina Marín	21	21
4	(Japan) Akane Yamaguchi	16	14
3	(India) P. V. Sindhu	21	14	21
2	(South Korea) Sung Ji-hyun	18	21	14

Final
1	(Spain) Carolina Marín	19	16
3	(India) P. V. Sindhu	21	21

== Men's doubles ==
=== Seeds ===
1. (Malaysia) Goh V Shem / Tan Wee Kiong (quarterfinals)
2. (Japan) Takeshi Kamura / Keigo Sonoda (second round)
3. (Denmark) Mathias Boe / Carsten Mogensen (second round)
4. (Indonesia) Marcus Fernaldi Gideon / Kevin Sanjaya Sukamuljo (champion)
5. (China) Li Junhui / Liu Yuchen (semifinals)
6. (Indonesia) Angga Pratama / Ricky Karanda Suwardi (final)
7. (Denmark) Mads Conrad-Petersen / Mads Pieler Kolding (semifinals)
8. (Russia) Vladimir Ivanov / Ivan Sozonov (quarterfinals)

=== Top half ===
First Round
1	(Malaysia) Goh V S (Malaysia) Tan W K	21	21
(Thailand) K Kedren (Thailand) D Puavaranukroh	17	19
PFQ	(India) K Chahal (India) T Gill	15	15
Q4	(Indonesia) H Setiawan (Malaysia) Tan B H	21	21
5	(China) Li JH (China) Liu YC	16	21	21
(Chinese Taipei) Liao K-h (Chinese Taipei) Lu C-p	21	17	15
(India) S Rankireddy (India) C Shetty	14	17
(Denmark) K Astrup (Denmark) A S Rasmussen	21	21
3	(Denmark) M Boe (Denmark) C Mogensen	21	21
(India) M. A Raju (India) V G Prasad	9	13
(England) M Ellis (England) C Langridge	18	18
(Chinese Taipei) Lee J-h (Chinese Taipei) Lee Y	21	21
6	(Indonesia) A Pratama (Indonesia) R K Suwardi	21	21
(Russia) E Dremin (Russia) D Grachev	14	17
Q3	(Thailand) S Jomkoh (Thailand) P Kuna-Anuvit	18	14
(Denmark) M Christiansen (Denmark) D Daugaard	21	21

Second Round
1	(Malaysia) Goh V S (Malaysia) Tan W K	21	21
Q4	(Indonesia) H Setiawan (Malaysia) Tan B H	10	17
5	(China) Li JH (China) Liu YC	21	23
(Denmark) K Astrup (Denmark) A S Rasmussen	12	21
3	(Denmark) M Boe (Denmark) C Mogensen	18	18
(Chinese Taipei) Lee J-h (Chinese Taipei) Lee Y	21	21
6	(Indonesia) A Pratama (Indonesia) R K Suwardi	21	17	21
(Denmark) M Christiansen (Denmark) D Daugaard	14	21	18

Quarterfinals
1	(Malaysia) Goh V S (Malaysia) Tan W K	15	17
5	(China) Li JH (China) Liu YC	21	21
(Chinese Taipei) Lee J-h (Chinese Taipei) Lee Y	20	23
6	(Indonesia) A Pratama (Indonesia) R K Suwardi	22	25

Semifinals
5	(China) Li JH (China) Liu YC	16	21	16
6	(Indonesia) A Pratama (Indonesia) R K Suwardi	21	13	21

=== Bottom half ===
First Round
(India) M Attri (India) B. S Reddy	19	19
(Japan) T Hoki (Japan) Y Kobayashi	21	21
(Thailand) B Issara (Thailand) N Puangpuapech	17	21	19
8	(Russia) V Ivanov (Russia) I Sozonov	21	12	21
(India) A Francis (India) T Kona	10	7
(Japan) T Inoue (Japan) Y Kaneko	21	21
(Chinese Taipei) Chen H-l (Chinese Taipei) Wang C-l	17	17
4	(Indonesia) M F Gideon (Indonesia) K S Sukamuljo	21	21
Q1	(South Korea) Choi S-g (South Korea) Kim G-j	21	21
(China) Huang KX (China) Wang YL	19	17
(India) J Sanyal (India) S Sharma	0^{r}
7	(Denmark) M Conrad-Petersen (Denmark) M Pieler Kolding	3
(India) Arjun M.R. (India) R Shlok	8	14
Q2	(South Korea) Kim J-h (South Korea) Yoo Y-s	21	21
(Indonesia) B Angriawan (Indonesia) Hardianto	13	17
2	(Japan) T Kamura (Japan) K Sonoda	21	21

Second Round
(Japan) T Hoki (Japan) Y Kobayashi	12	21	8
8	(Russia) V Ivanov (Russia) I Sozonov	21	8	21
(Japan) T Inoue (Japan) Y Kaneko	16	18
4	(Indonesia) M F Gideon (Indonesia) K S Sukamuljo	21	21
Q1	(South Korea) Choi S-g (South Korea) Kim G-j	21	16	17
7	(Denmark) M Conrad-Petersen (Denmark) M Pieler Kolding	13	21	21
Q2	(South Korea) Kim J-h (South Korea) Yoo Y-s	21	19	21
2	(Japan) T Kamura (Japan) K Sonoda	13	21	17

Quarterfinals
8	(Russia) V Ivanov (Russia) I Sozonov	18	20
4	(Indonesia) M F Gideon (Indonesia) K S Sukamuljo	21	22
7	(Denmark) M Conrad-Petersen (Denmark) M Pieler Kolding	21	21
Q2	(South Korea) Kim J-h (South Korea) Yoo Y-s	10	17

Semifinals
4	(Indonesia) M F Gideon (Indonesia) K S Sukamuljo	21	18	21
7	(Denmark) M Conrad-Petersen (Denmark) M Pieler Kolding	14	21	9

=== Finals ===
Semifinals
5	(China) Li Junhui (China) Liu Yuchen	16	21	16
6	(Indonesia) Angga Pratama (Indonesia) Ricky Karanda Suwardi	21	13	21
4	(Indonesia) Marcus Fernaldi Gideon (Indonesia) Kevin Sanjaya Sukamuljo	21	18	21
7	(Denmark) Mads Conrad-Petersen (Denmark) Mads Pieler Kolding	14	21	9

Final
6	(Indonesia) Angga Pratama (Indonesia) Ricky Karanda Suwardi	11	15
4	(Indonesia) Marcus Fernaldi Gideon (Indonesia) Kevin Sanjaya Sukamuljo	21	21

== Women's doubles ==
=== Seeds ===
1. (South Korea) Jung Kyung-eun / Shin Seung-chan (semifinals)
2. (South Korea) Chang Ye-na / Lee So-hee (first round)
3. (Japan) Naoko Fukuman / Kurumi Yonao (final)
4. (Thailand) Puttita Supajirakul / Sapsiree Taerattanachai (quarterfinals)
5. (Thailand) Jongkolphan Kititharakul / Rawinda Prajongjai (second round)
6. (Bulgaria) Gabriela Stoeva / Stefani Stoeva (second round)
7. (Japan) Shiho Tanaka / Koharu Yonemoto (champion)
8. (Denmark) Maiken Fruergaard / Sara Thygesen (quarterfinals)

=== Top half ===
First Round
1	(South Korea) Jung K-e (South Korea) Shin S-c	21	21
(Russia) A Chervyakova (Russia) O Morozova	7	12
(India) K Antil (India) L Dahiya	14	16
Q1	(Indonesia) C S Ayunidha (Indonesia) D R Vehrenica	21	21
6	(Bulgaria) G Stoeva (Bulgaria) S Stoeva	21	21
(India) S Santosh (India) A S Sunil	10	16
(South Korea) Chae Y-j (South Korea) Kim H-n	21	21
(India) A Balan (India) P Sawant	12	19
4	(Thailand) P Supajirakul (Thailand) S Taerattanachai	21	21
(Japan) A Higashino (Japan) A Kurihara	11	14
(India) A Ponnappa (India) N. S Reddy	21	21
Q3	(England) G Adcock (England) J Pugh	16	16
7	(Japan) S Tanaka (Japan) K Yonemoto	21	21
(India) D Gupta (India) P Rai	4	9
(Chinese Taipei) Lin X-m (Chinese Taipei) Wu F-c	21	21
(India) J Dewangan (India) S Singh	3	6

Second Round
1	(South Korea) Jung K-e (South Korea) Shin S-c	21	21
Q1	(Indonesia) C S Ayunidha (Indonesia) D R Vehrenica	13	5
6	(Bulgaria) G Stoeva (Bulgaria) S Stoeva	12	21	19
(South Korea) Chae Y-j (South Korea) Kim H-n	21	16	21
4	(Thailand) P Supajirakul (Thailand) S Taerattanachai	21	21
(India) A Ponnappa (India) N. S Reddy	15	10
7	(Japan) S Tanaka (Japan) K Yonemoto	21	21
(Chinese Taipei) Lin X-m (Chinese Taipei) Wu F-c	11	8

Quarterfinals
1	(South Korea) Jung K-e (South Korea) Shin S-c	18	21	21
(South Korea) Chae Y-j (South Korea) Kim H-n	21	12	15
4	(Thailand) P Supajirakul (Thailand) S Taerattanachai	20	19
7	(Japan) S Tanaka (Japan) K Yonemoto	22	21

Semifinals
1	(South Korea) Jung K-e (South Korea) Shin S-c	16	21	22
7	(Japan) S Tanaka (Japan) K Yonemoto	21	19	24

=== Bottom half ===
First Round
(Germany) J Goliszewski (Germany) L Kaepplein	19	16
(Chinese Taipei) Hsu Y-c (Chinese Taipei) Wu T-j	21	21
(India) M Jakkampudi (India) P S Ram	9	15
8	(Denmark) M Fruergaard (Denmark) S Thygesen	21	21
Q4	(India) S Mundada (India) A Parikh	22	21
(India) G Asaji (India) M M Bora	20	8
(Chinese Taipei) Chiang K-h (Chinese Taipei) Hung S-h	21	13
3	(Japan) N Fukuman (Japan) K Yonao	23	21
(India) Sruthi K.P (India) H M Harinarayanan	3	4
(Japan) Y Fukushima (Japan) S Hirota	21	21
Q2	(India) M Aggarwal (India) K. Maneesha	9	8
5	(Thailand) J Kititharakul (Thailand) R Prajongjai	21	21
(India) K Garg (India) N B Hazarika	9	16
(England) L Smith (England) S Walker	21	21
(China) Huang YQ (China) Tang JH	21	21
2	(South Korea) Chang Y-n (South Korea) Lee S-h	10	18

Second Round
(Chinese Taipei) Hsu Y-c (Chinese Taipei) Wu T-j	21	12	19
8	(Denmark) M Fruergaard (Denmark) S Thygesen	18	21	21
Q4	(India) S Mundada (India) A Parikh	5	10
3	(Japan) N Fukuman (Japan) K Yonao	21	21
(Japan) Y Fukushima (Japan) S Hirota	23	21
5	(Thailand) J Kititharakul (Thailand) R Prajongjai	21	12
(England) L Smith (England) S Walker	10	21	13
(China) Huang YQ (China) Tang JH	21	18	21

Quarterfinals
8	(Denmark) M Fruergaard (Denmark) S Thygesen	19	22	11
3	(Japan) N Fukuman (Japan) K Yonao	21	20	21
(Japan) Y Fukushima (Japan) S Hirota	29	21	21
(China) Huang YQ (China) Tang JH	30	18	15

Semifinals
3	(Japan) N Fukuman (Japan) K Yonao	21	21
(Japan) Y Fukushima (Japan) S Hirota	16	13

=== Finals ===
Semifinals
1	(South Korea) Jung Kyung-eun (South Korea) Shin Seung-chan	16	21	22
7	(Japan) Shiho Tanaka (Japan) Koharu Yonemoto	21	19	24
3	(Japan) Naoko Fukuman (Japan) Kurumi Yonao	21	21
(Japan) Yuki Fukushima (Japan) Sayaka Hirota	16	13

Final
7	(Japan) Shiho Tanaka (Japan) Koharu Yonemoto	16	21	21
3	(Japan) Naoko Fukuman (Japan) Kurumi Yonao	21	19	10

== Mixed doubles ==
=== Seeds ===
1. (China) Zheng Siwei / Chen Qingchen (final)
2. (China) Lu Kai / Huang Yaqiong (champion)
3. (England) Chris Adcock / Gabrielle Adcock (semifinals)
4. (Malaysia) Chan Peng Soon / Goh Liu Ying (semifinals)
5. (Thailand) Dechapol Puavaranukroh / Sapsiree Taerattanachai (first round)
6. (Japan) Kenta Kazuno / Ayane Kurihara (quarterfinals)
7. (India) Pranaav Jerry Chopra / N. Sikki Reddy (second round)
8. (Thailand) Bodin Issara / Savitree Amitrapai (quarterfinals)

=== Top half ===
First Round
1	(China) Zheng SW (China) Chen QC	21	21
(England) B Lane (England) J Pugh	12	19
(Japan) Y Kobayashi (Japan) K Yonemoto	18	16
(China) Wang YL (China) Du Y	21	21
6	(Japan) K Kazuno (Japan) A Kurihara	21	21
(Thailand) S Jomkoh (Thailand) P Supajirakul	13	14
(Thailand) N Puangpuapech (Thailand) J Kititharakul	18	22
Q4	(South Korea) Kim J-h (South Korea) Lee S-h	21	24
4	(Malaysia) Chan P S (Malaysia) Goh L Y	21	21
(India) V G Prasad (India) J Dewangan	12	12
(Indonesia) E Subaktiar (Indonesia) G E Widjaja	21	16	21
(Malaysia) Y Khrishnan (India) P Sawant	16	21	16
5	(Thailand) D Puavaranukroh (Thailand) S Taerattanachai	21	15	18
(South Korea) Kim G-j (South Korea) Shin S-c	19	21	21
(South Korea) Yoo Y-s (South Korea) Kim H-n	17	12
(Denmark) M Christiansen (Denmark) S Thygesen	21	21

Second Round
1	(China) Zheng SW (China) Chen QC	w	/	o
(China) Wang YL (China) Du Y
6	(Japan) K Kazuno (Japan) A Kurihara	19	21	21
Q4	(South Korea) Kim J-h (South Korea) Lee S-h	21	18	14
4	(Malaysia) Chan P S (Malaysia) Goh L Y	21	21
(Indonesia) E Subaktiar (Indonesia) G E Widjaja	11	19
(South Korea) Kim G-j (South Korea) Shin S-c	15	22	21
(Denmark) M Christiansen (Denmark) S Thygesen	21	20	19

Quarterfinals
1	(China) Zheng SW (China) Chen QC	21	21
6	(Japan) K Kazuno (Japan) A Kurihara	12	16
4	(Malaysia) Chan P S (Malaysia) Goh L Y	22	19	21
(South Korea) Kim G-j (South Korea) Shin S-c	20	21	15

Semifinals
1	(China) Zheng SW (China) Chen QC	w	/	o
4	(Malaysia) Chan P S (Malaysia) Goh L Y

=== Bottom half ===
First Round
(Chinese Taipei) Lin C-y (Chinese Taipei) Wu T-j	12	18
(South Korea) Choi S-g (South Korea) Chae Y-j	21	21
(Japan) Y Watanabe (Japan) A Higashino	15	14
8	(Thailand) B Issara (Thailand) S Amitrapai	21	21
(United States) Y T Chan (United States) Y Kawasaki	10	7
(Chinese Taipei) Lee Y (Chinese Taipei) Hsu Y-c	21	21
Q2	(India) D Kapila (India) K Garg	15	10
3	(England) C Adcock (England) G Adcock	21	21
(Russia) E Dremin (Russia) E Dimova	21	19	21
(Denmark) S Gravholt (Denmark) M Fruergaard	15	21	16
(Indonesia) H Faisal (Indonesia) S D Aulia	15	19
7	(India) P J Chopra (India) N. S Reddy	21	21
PFQ	(Chinese Taipei) Wang C-l (Chinese Taipei) Lee C-h	15	16
Q3	(England) M Ellis (England) L Smith	21	21
Q1	(India) S Sharma (India) A Parikh	5	9
2	(China) Lu K (China) Huang YQ	21	21

Second Round
(South Korea) Choi S-g (South Korea) Chae Y-j	11	8
8	(Thailand) B Issara (Thailand) S Amitrapai	21	21
(Chinese Taipei) Lee Y (Chinese Taipei) Hsu Y-c	21	20
3	(England) C Adcock (England) G Adcock	23	22
(Russia) E Dremin (Russia) E Dimova	21	21
7	(India) P J Chopra (India) N. S Reddy	18	19
Q3	(England) M Ellis (England) L Smith	11	17
2	(China) Lu K (China) Huang YQ	21	21

Quarterfinals
8	(Thailand) B Issara (Thailand) S Amitrapai	21	15	15
3	(England) C Adcock (England) G Adcock	16	21	21
(Russia) E Dremin (Russia) E Dimova	8	16^{r}
2	(China) Lu K (China) Huang YQ	21	20

Semifinals
3	(England) C Adcock (England) G Adcock	13	13
2	(China) Lu K (China) Huang YQ	21	21

=== Finals ===
Semifinals
1	(China) Zheng Siwei (China) Chen Qingchen	w	/	o
4	(Malaysia) Chan Peng Soon (Malaysia) Goh Liu Ying
3	(England) Chris Adcock (England) Gabrielle Adcock	13	13
2	(China) Lu Kai (China) Huang Yaqiong	21	21

Final
1	(China) Zheng Siwei (China) Chen Qingchen	24	14	17
2	(China) Lu Kai (China) Huang Yaqiong	22	21	21

Preceded by 2016 India Super Series	India Open	Succeeded by 2018 India Open
Preceded by 2017 All England Super Series Premier	BWF Super Series; 2017 BWF Season	Succeeded by 2017 Malaysia Super Series Premier
