= 2013 Asian Junior Badminton Championships – Boys doubles =

Tournament details
- Dates: 10 – 14 July 2013
- Edition: 16
- Venue: Likas Indoor Stadium
- Location: Kota Kinabalu, Malaysia

The Boys' Doubles tournament of the 2013 Asian Junior Badminton Championships was held from July 10–14 in Kota Kinabalu, Malaysia. The defending champion of the last edition were Arya Maulana Aldiartama and Edi Subaktiar from Indonesia. Aldiartama this time teamed-up with Kevin Sanjaya Sukamuljo, and standing in the top seeds. The final turned into all-Chinese final after Li Junhui / Liu Yuchen faced their fellow countrymen Huang Kaixiang / Zheng Siwei in the finals that won by Li and Liu in straight games 21–15, 21–14.

== Seeded ==
1. (Indonesia) Arya Maulana Aldiartama / Kevin Sanjaya Sukamuljo (semi-final)
2. (South Korea) Choi Sol-kyu / Park Se-woong (third round)
3. (Malaysia) Darren Isaac Devadass / Ong Yew Sin (third round)
4. (South Korea) Kim Jae-hwan / Kim Jung-ho (quarter-final)
5. (Chinese Taipei) Tien Tzu-chieh / Wang Chi-lin (quarter-final)
6. (Indonesia) Arsya Isnanu Ardiputra / Yantoni Edy Saputra (second round)
7. (China) Li Junhui / Liu Yuchen (champion)
8. (Thailand) Dechapol Puavaranukroh / Ketlen Kittinupong (quarter-final)

== Draw ==
=== Finals ===
Quarterfinals
1	(Indonesia) Arya Maulana Aldiartama (Indonesia) Kevin Sanjaya Sukamuljo	19	21	21
5	(Chinese Taipei) Tien Tzu-chieh (Chinese Taipei) Wang Chi-lin	21	14	19
4	(South Korea) Kim Jae-hwan (South Korea) Kim Jung-ho	15	21	13
7	(China) Li Junhui (China) Liu Yuchen	21	19	21
8	(Thailand) Dechapol Puavaranukroh (Thailand) Ketlen Kittinupong	14	15
(China) Huang Kaixiang (China) Zheng Siwei	21	21
(Chinese Taipei) Chang Ko-chi (Chinese Taipei) Liao Chi-hung	21	15	20
(China) Tao Jianqi (China) Zhao Jian	14	21	22

Semifinals
1	(Indonesia) Arya Maulana Aldiartama (Indonesia) Kevin Sanjaya Sukamuljo	16	12
7	(China) Li Junhui (China) Liu Yuchen	21	21
(China) Huang Kaixiang (China) Zheng Siwei	21	13	21
(China) Tao Jianqi (China) Zhao Jian	19	21	19

Final
7	(China) Li Junhui (China) Liu Yuchen	21	21
(China) Huang Kaixiang (China) Zheng Siwei	15	14

=== Top Half ===
==== Section 1 ====
First Round
1	(Indonesia) A Aldiartama (Indonesia) K Sukamuljo
BYE
(Thailand) K Chairojkanjana (Thailand) S Pol-Gul
BYE
(Sri Lanka) S Angodavidanalage (Sri Lanka) B Dumbukola
BYE
(India) S Shukla (India) V Singh	26	19
(Hong Kong) Lee CY (Hong Kong) Yeung SC	28	21

Second Round
1	(Indonesia) A Aldiartama (Indonesia) K Sukamuljo	23	21
(Thailand) K Chairojkanjana (Thailand) S Pol-Gul	21	13
(Sri Lanka) S Angodavidanalage (Sri Lanka) B Dumbukola	12	13
(Hong Kong) Lee CY (Hong Kong) Yeung SC	21	21

Third Round
1	(Indonesia) A Aldiartama (Indonesia) K Sukamuljo	21	21
(Hong Kong) Lee CY (Hong Kong) Yeung SC	12	14

==== Section 2 ====
First Round
5	(Chinese Taipei) Tien T-c (Chinese Taipei) Wang C-l
BYE
(Vietnam) Do TD (Vietnam) Pham HN	13	21	14
(Japan) T Hoki (Japan) Y Kobayashi	21	18	21
(Malaysia) Chen JH (Malaysia) Goh SF
BYE
(Uzbekistan) A Bakhshullaev (Uzbekistan) H Orziobev	11	8
(Singapore) T Hee (Singapore) Tan ZJ	21	21

Second Round
5	(Chinese Taipei) Tien T-c (Chinese Taipei) Wang C-l	21	18	21
(Japan) T Hoki (Japan) Y Kobayashi	18	21	15
(Malaysia) Chen JH (Malaysia) Goh SF	16	20
(Singapore) T Hee (Singapore) Tan ZJ	21	22

Third Round
5	(Chinese Taipei) Tien T-c (Chinese Taipei) Wang C-l	21	21
(Singapore) T Hee (Singapore) Tan ZJ	11	12

==== Section 3 ====
First Round
4	(South Korea) Kim J-h (South Korea) Kim J-h
BYE
(Thailand) K Namdash (Thailand) W Thongsa-Nga
BYE
(Vietnam) Pham CC (Vietnam) Vo BT
BYE
(Singapore) C Chua (Singapore) L Teng	16	17
(Malaysia) Chua KW (Malaysia) Woon MC	21	21

Second Round
4	(South Korea) Kim J-h (South Korea) Kim J-h	20	21	21
(Thailand) K Namdash (Thailand) W Thongsa-Nga	22	16	18
(Vietnam) Pham CC (Vietnam) Vo BT	18	17
(Malaysia) Chua KW (Malaysia) Woon MC	21	21

Third Round
4	(South Korea) Kim J-h (South Korea) Kim J-h	21	21
(Malaysia) Chua KW (Malaysia) Woon MC	16	19

==== Section 4 ====
First Round
7	(China) Li JH (China) Liu YC
BYE
(Macau) Iek UI (Macau) Lou HM	13	5
(Japan) Y Onodera (Japan) H Shimono	21	21
(Malaysia) Chua KY (Malaysia) M Zainuddin
BYE
(Indonesia) F Alfian (Indonesia) R Swastedian	21	21
(Bangladesh) A Jaman (Bangladesh) T Roy	10	12

Second Round
7	(China) Li JH (China) Liu YC	21	21
(Japan) Y Onodera (Japan) H Shimono	15	9
(Malaysia) Chua KY (Malaysia) M Zainuddin	21	21
(Indonesia) F Alfian (Indonesia) R Swastedian	12	18

Third Round
7	(China) Li JH (China) Liu YC	21	21
(Malaysia) Chua KY (Malaysia) M Zainuddin	14	11

=== Bottom Half ===
==== Section 5 ====
First Round
(Japan) Y Igarashi (Japan) K Matsumoto	21	21
(Macau) J Lo (Macau) Vong IC	10	10
BYE
(Sri Lanka) K Halambage (Sri Lanka) M Samaranayake
(South Korea) Lee J-s (South Korea) Seo S-j	21	21
(Hong Kong) Y Chung (Hong Kong) Lee CW	10	17
BYE
8	(Thailand) D Puavaranukroh (Thailand) K Kittinupong

Second Round
(Japan) Y Igarashi (Japan) K Matsumoto	21	21
(Sri Lanka) K Halambage (Sri Lanka) M Samaranayake	6	7
(South Korea) Lee J-s (South Korea) Seo S-j	12	21	17
8	(Thailand) D Puavaranukroh (Thailand) K Kittinupong	21	17	21

Third Round
(Japan) Y Igarashi (Japan) K Matsumoto	21	12	11
8	(Thailand) D Puavaranukroh (Thailand) K Kittinupong	19	21	21

==== Section 6 ====
First Round
(China) Huang KX (China) Zheng SW	21	22
(India) S Prasad (India) S Ramachandran	10	20
BYE
(Chinese Taipei) Chiang Y-w (Chinese Taipei) Lee Y
(Iran) A Faghfori (Iran) M Shahbazi	21	21
(Bangladesh) M Munna (Bangladesh) M Hossain	12	11
BYE
3	(Malaysia) D Devadass (Malaysia) Ong YS

Second Round
(China) Huang KX (China) Zheng SW	21	19	21
(Chinese Taipei) Chiang Y-w (Chinese Taipei) Lee Y	15	21	17
(Iran) A Faghfori (Iran) M Shahbazi	14	7
3	(Malaysia) D Devadass (Malaysia) Ong YS	21	21

Third Round
(China) Huang KX (China) Zheng SW	21	21
3	(Malaysia) D Devadass (Malaysia) Ong YS	18	18

==== Section 7 ====
First Round
(Sri Lanka) I Kahingalage (Sri Lanka) P Ranaweera	9	12
(Singapore) Ngiam B (Singapore) Tan MS	21	21
BYE
(Kazakhstan) K Kulmatov (Kazakhstan) D Serebryakov
(India) C Reddy (India) S Ravuri	19	21	17
(Chinese Taipei) Chang K-c (Chinese Taipei) Liao C-h	21	12	21
BYE
6	(Indonesia) A Ardiputra (Indonesia) Y Saputra

Second Round
(Singapore) Ngiam B (Singapore) Tan MS	21	21
(Kazakhstan) K Kulmatov (Kazakhstan) D Serebryakov	7	10
(Chinese Taipei) Chang K-c (Chinese Taipei) Liao C-h	21	21
6	(Indonesia) A Ardiputra (Indonesia) Y Saputra	10	19

Third Round
(Singapore) Ngiam B (Singapore) Tan MS	13	13
(Chinese Taipei) Chang K-c (Chinese Taipei) Liao C-h	21	21

==== Section 8 ====
First Round
(Nepal) D Dhami (Nepal) B Magar	7	7
(China) Tao JQ (China) Zhao J	21	21
BYE
(Vietnam) Duong QK (Vietnam) Ngo XT
BYE
(Malaysia) Sim GZ (Malaysia) Tan JH
BYE
2	(South Korea) Choi S-k (South Korea) Park S-w

Second Round
(China) Tao JQ (China) Zhao J	21	21
(Vietnam) Duong QK (Vietnam) Ngo XT	16	13
(Malaysia) Sim GZ (Malaysia) Tan JH	15	16
2	(South Korea) Choi S-k (South Korea) Park S-w	21	21

Third Round
(China) Tao JQ (China) Zhao J	21	21
2	(South Korea) Choi S-k (South Korea) Park S-w	17	18
