= Kevin Sanjaya Sukamuljo =

Indonesian badminton player

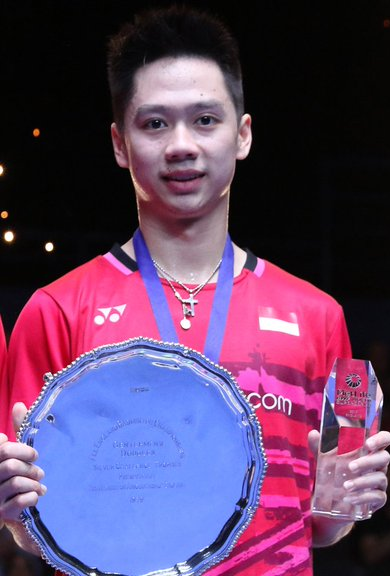
- Sukamuljo at the 2017 All England Open

Personal information
- Born: 2 August 1995 (age 31) Banyuwangi, East Java, Indonesia
- Height: 1.70 m (5 ft 7 in)
- Weight: 55 kg (121 lb)
- Spouse: Valencia Tanoesoedibjo (m. 2023)

Sport
- Country: Indonesia
- Sport: Badminton
- Handedness: Right
- Coached by: Herry Iman Pierngadi; Aryono Miranat

Men's doubles
- Career record: 364 wins, 103 losses
- Highest ranking: 1 (with Marcus Fernaldi Gideon 16 March 2017)
- BWF profile
Medal record
Men's badminton
Representing Indonesia
Sudirman Cup
Bronze medal – third place	2015 Dongguan	Mixed team
Bronze medal – third place	2019 Nanning	Mixed team
Thomas Cup
Gold medal – first place	2020 Aarhus	Men's team
Silver medal – second place	2016 Kunshan	Men's team
Silver medal – second place	2022 Bangkok	Men's team
Bronze medal – third place	2018 Bangkok	Men's team
Asian Games
Gold medal – first place	2018 Jakarta–Palembang	Men's doubles
Silver medal – second place	2018 Jakarta–Palembang	Men's team
Asian Championships
Silver medal – second place	2019 Wuhan	Men's doubles
Asia Team Championships
Gold medal – first place	2018 Alor Setar	Men's team
Gold medal – first place	2020 Manila	Men's team
SEA Games
Gold medal – first place	2015 Singapore	Men's team
Silver medal – second place	2015 Singapore	Men's doubles
World Junior Championships
Silver medal – second place	2013 Bangkok	Mixed doubles
Silver medal – second place	2013 Bangkok	Mixed team
Asian Junior Championships
Bronze medal – third place	2012 Gimcheon	Boys' doubles
Bronze medal – third place	2013 Kota Kinabalu	Boys' doubles
Bronze medal – third place	2013 Kota Kinabalu	Mixed team

Kevin Sanjaya Sukamuljo (born 2 August 1995) is an Indonesian former badminton player who was ranked world number 1 in the men's doubles by the Badminton World Federation. Considered as one of the best players of his generation, he won the men's doubles titles at the All England Open in 2017 and 2018; the World Superseries Finals in 2017; and the Asian Games in 2018. He was also featured in the Indonesia winning team at the SEA Games in 2015; the Asia Team Championships in 2018 and 2020; and the Thomas Cup in 2020. Together with his then partner Marcus Fernaldi Gideon, they were awarded the BWF Best Male Players of the Year for two consecutive years after collecting seven Superseries titles in 2017 and eight World Tour titles in 2018.

Sukamuljo and Gideon are often referred to as "the Minions" because of their below average height as well as their fast and agile playing style, jumping and bouncing just like the Minions in the film Despicable Me.

== Early and personal life ==
Kevin Sanjaya Sukamuljo was born on 2 August 1995 in Banyuwangi, East Java, Indonesia, to parents Sugiarto Sukamuljo and Winartin Niawati of Chinese Indonesians ethnicity. He is the nephew of former world number 1 men's doubles player, Alvent Yulianto. Sukamuljo started to learn about badminton at two and a half years, by seeing his father play on the court behind their house. Noticing young Sukamuljo's interest in badminton, his father then found a coach in Jember at the Putra 46 club to foster his child's talent for a year. Sukamuljo later entered the Sari Agung club in Banyuwangi and in 2006, at the age of eleven, he won a Graha Bhakti Cup tournament. Recognizing his talent, Sukamuljo's parents encouraged him to join a bigger club. He then took part at the general auditions scholarship held by PB Djarum, but failed due to his small physique. However, he refused to give up, and began training everyday, instead of his usual 4 days a week routine. With these additional hours, he finally managed to pass the audition at PB Djarum in 2007.

After joining PB Djarum, Sukamuljo went through defeat after defeat. At first, Sukamuljo played in the men's singles discipline. However, he was then turned toward the doubles disciplines, experimenting with both the men's and mixed doubles. Initially, he and his parents resisted this turn toward specialization in doubles, but men's doubles coach Ade Lukas believed that this was where Sukamuljo's skills and abilities would be best utilized. After a year of training in doubles, he showed progress and had great expectations going forward.

In January 2022, Sukamuljo revealed his romantic relationship with entrepreneur Valencia Tanoesoedibjo, the second daughter of Indonesian media businessman and politician Hary Tanoesoedibjo, after much speculation from the public from around December 2021. The two were officially engaged in August 2022, in which Sukamuljo proposed to Tanoesoedibjo at the Jakarta International Stadium. The couple got married on 23 March 2023, in Paris, France. Sukamuljo's teammates Fajar Alfian and Muhammad Rian Ardianto were present as groomsmen in the ceremony.

== Career ==
=== 2010–2013: Junior and early senior career ===
In the PB Djarum club, Sukamuljo was trained by Sigit Budiarto. He won some National Circuit tournaments in his age group with different partners. In 2010, he won the Kalimantan, North Sulawesi, Pekanbaru, and Jakarta circuits, and also the Candra Wijaya men's doubles championships. In 2011, he won the Jakarta circuit and Pertamina Open. He represented Indonesia at the 2011 ASEAN School Games held at the Yio Chu Kang Sports Hall, Singapore, and won a gold in the mixed doubles with Aris Budiharti, and a silver in the boys' doubles with Felix Kinalsal. In July 2011, just before turning 16, Sukamuljo qualified to compete in the international senior age group, by reaching the finals of the Singapore International Series tournament partnered with Lukhi Apri Nugroho. He also played at the World Junior Championships held in Taoyuan City, but was eliminated in the quarter-finals in the boys' doubles event with his partner Nugroho.

In 2012, Sukamuljo won the U-19 National tournament the Jakarta Open and West Java circuits, also the Candra Wijaya men's doubles championships. In July, he won a bronze medal at the Asian Junior Championships in the boys' doubles event with Alfian Eko Prasetya. He was named as the "future athlete" at the Tangkas Specs Junior Challenge after showing a good performance and finished as runner-up in that tournament. In August, he was ranked as number 1 in the BWF World Junior Ranking. In October–November, he competed at the World Junior Championships held in Chiba, Japan, but lost in the early stages of both the boys' and mixed doubles events. In December, he clinched the boys' doubles title at the Junior National Championships with Rafiddias Akhdan Nugroho.

In 2013, Sukamuljo was selected to join the national men's doubles team squad. He started the season by competing in Vietnam International Challenge partnered with Rafiddias Akhdan Nugroho, but lost in the quarter-finals to the Hong Kong pair Chan Yun Lung and Wong Wai Hong in a close rubber game. In May, he won the West Java circuit tournament teamed with Hafiz Faizal. In July, he competed at the Asian Junior Championships held in Kota Kinabalu, Malaysia, and captured bronze medals in the mixed team and boys' doubles events partnered with Arya Maulana Aldiartama. Turning eighteen in August, he won the mixed doubles title at the Tangkas Specs Junior International Challenge with Masita Mahmudin. In October–November, he participated at the World Junior Championships in Bangkok, Thailand where he helped Indonesia to win the silver medal in the mixed team event. In the individual tournament he earned mixed doubles silver with Mahmudin, losing the final match to the Chinese pair Huang Kaixiang and Chen Qingchen, whom they had beaten the previous week in the semifinals of team play.

=== 2014–2016: From International Challenge to Superseries titles ===
Sukamuljo began the 2014 season playing with a new partner, Selvanus Geh, and won his very first tournament with Geh, the Vietnam International Challenge by beating Australians Robin Middleton and Ross Smith in the finals. In his second month playing with Geh, he captured his first Grand Prix doubles title at the New Zealand Open, when he and Geh upset the second seeds from Chinese Taipei Chen Hung-ling and Lu Chia-pin in the finals. In June, he competed against the world's best players at the Indonesia Open paired with Geh and with Greysia Polii in mixed doubles . Starting from the qualification round in both events, he was stopped in the second round of the main draw in both, but in the first round of mixed doubles, he and Polii put out the defending champions and world number ones Zhang Nan and Zhao Yunlei, 15–21, 21–18, 23–21. In July, Sukamuljo and Geh reached the quarterfinals of the Chinese Taipei Open. In September, they reached their first Grand Prix Gold final as a team at the Indonesia Masters where they were beaten in three games by Marcus Fernaldi Gideon and doubles great Markis Kido the top seeds. Sukamuljo then won his third title with Geh at the Bulgarian International defeating compatriots Ronald Alexander and Edi Subaktiar in the final. Sukamuljo's mixed doubles partnerships with Della Destiara Haris and Maretha Dea Giovani were less successful reaching no farther than the quarterfinals of any 2014 tournament. In December Sukamuljo joined Indonesia's team for the Axiata Cup in Kuala Lumpur, but the squad was narrowly edged by Thailand.

In 2015, head coach of the Indonesia national men's doubles juniors, Chafidz Yusuf, paired Sukamuljo with Marcus Fernaldi Gideon, because Selvanus Geh had to resign from the national team due to illness. The new partnership opened the season in Europe playing at the All England and Swiss Open. In England they reached the quarterfinals before falling to the Danish pair Mads Conrad-Petersen and Mads Pieler Kolding, Partnered with Greysia Polii, Sukamuljo lost in the second round of mixed double to fifth seeds Chris and Gabby Adcock. In Switzerland, he and Gideon were stopped in the semi-finals by the Malaysian pair Goh V Shem and Tan Wee Kiong. Sukamuljo then took part in the Sudirman Cup held in Dongguan, China, where Indonesia settled for a bronze medal. At the June SEA Games in Singapore, he helped his team win the gold medal, and in the individual men's doubles event, he and Gideon captured the silver medal.

In July, Sukamuljo and Gideon competing as an unseeded pair in the Chinese Taipei Open, and the duo reached the final by defeating then World Champions Mohammad Ahsan and Hendra Setiawan, but they failed to take the title, losing the final tamely to Fu Haifeng and Zhang Nan. After this tournament, Indonesian badminton fans dub them as "the Minions" because of their below average height and for their fast and agile playing style, jumping and bouncing just like the Minions in the film Despicable Me. The former badminton player who is currently a BWF commentator, Gillian Clark, also highlighted that the fast play shown by Sukamuljo and Gideon have taken the men's doubles game to a new level and makes the matches exciting to watch. In the next tournament, the duo then reached the semifinals of the Vietnam and Thailand Opens before capturing their first title together at the Chinese Taipei Masters in October where they beat Malaysia' Hoon Thien How and Lim Khim Wah in the finals. In the Hong Kong Open, Sukamuljo and Gideon beat the World Championship silver medalists Liu Xiaolong and Qiu Zihan before losing to top seededed South Koreans Lee Yong-dae and Yoo Yeon-seong in the quarterfinals. In December, they were stopped in the quarter-finals of the Indonesia Masters by second seeds Chai Biao and Hong Wei in three games. They ended the 2015 season ranked 16th in the world.

Sukamuljo and Gideon kicked off the 2016 season by winning the Malaysia Masters in January. They then suffered a slump with early exits from several tournaments, including a first round exit from the All England Open. After this All England low their form, though inconsistent, improved significantly. They reached the semifinals of the New Zealand Open in late March and in April clinched their first Superseries title as a team at the India Open, beating their senior compatriot Angga Pratama and Ricky Karanda Suwardi in the final. In the following weeks they were defeated in the second round of Malaysia Open, then in the quarter-finals of Singapore Open and Asian Championships. In May, Sukamuljo participated in the Thomas Cup held in Kunshan, China, but he failed to contribute points to the Indonesian team during the Thomas Cup Group B tie against Thailand. and was not selected to play in the knockout stage of the tournament between qualifying teams. Here Indonesia won the silver medal, losing the final 2 matches to 3 against Denmark.

In June, Sukamuljo and Gideon were eliminated in the second round of Indonesia Open by world number 1 Lee Yong-dae and Yoo Yeon-seong. A week later, however, the duo won their second Superseries title at the Australian Open, in the quarterfinals defeating Zhang Nan and Fu Haifeng for the first time, to whom they had lost three previous matches. Due to an injury suffered by Gideon, Sukamuljo was paired with Wahyu Nayaka at the home soil Indonesian Masters tournament, but the scratch partnership still managed to win the title. After Gideon's recovery the reunited duo won the Superseries Premier tournament at the China Open. The team was ranked as number 4 in Destination Dubai rankings, and qualified to compete for the year-end Superseries Finals, but they failed to advance from the group phase. Nevertheless, at year's end Sukamuljo and Gideon occupied the number 2 position in the world rankings.

=== 2017: World number 1 ===
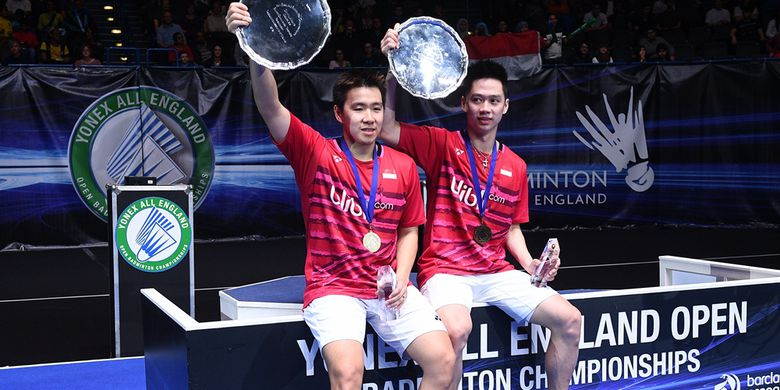
Sukamuljo and Marcus Fernaldi Gideon won the 2017 All England Open

Now competing only in the world's biggest events, Sukamuljo and Gideon started 2017 by making up for their 2016 first round defeat with a tournament victory at the coveted All England Open in March, thus earning a number one men's doubles world ranking. They then secured their second consecutive India Open title, and after that won the Malaysia Open. Their remarkable winning run was then stopped by Danish veterans Mathias Boe and Carsten Mogensen in the semifinals of the Singapore Open. In May, they played for Indonesia at the Sudirman Cup held in Australia. In group round robin play they won their country's only point in its surprising loss to India but in group play against Denmark they again lost to Boe and Mogensen, as Indonesia, for the first time in the Cup's 28-year history, was eliminated in the group stage of the competition. In June the duo was upset by another Danish pair, Kim Astrup and Anders Skaarup Rasmussen, in the first round of Indonesia Open.

In August, Sukamuljo and Gideon went to the World Championships held in Glasgow, Scotland, as third seeds, but lost in the quarter-finals to China's Chai Biao and Hong Wei in three close games. In September they reached the final of the Korea Open but were again beaten by Boe and Morgensen, however, one week later they exacted a measure of revenge against the Danes in the semi-finals of Japan Open, then went on to win the tournament by defeating the host pair of Takuto Inoue and Yuki Kaneko. In October, Sukamuljo and Gideon lost the final of the Denmark Open in a tight match to reigning World Champion Liu Cheng and Zhang Nan. Citing an arm injury suffered during their semifinal match in Denmark, Gideon withdrew from the next Superseries tournament in France. Back together in November, Sukamuljo and Gideon improved their head-to-head record against Boe and Mogensen to 3–4, after defeating them in the finals and securing their second China Open title. They won the Hong Kong Open a week later, their sixth Superseries victory of the season, thus equaling the previous men's doubles record of six set by South Koreans Lee Yong-dae and Yoo Yeon-seong in 2015. For their achievements Sukamuljo and Gideon were named Best Male Players of the Year by the Badminton World Federation. The duo then closed out the year by capturing the Dubai World Superseries Finals, making them the first men's doubles pair to win seven Superseries titles in a year.

=== 2018: Asian Games gold medalists ===
Under the new BWF player commitment regulations, Sukamuljo and Gideon who ranked as world number 1, are obligated to play in 12 BWF World Tour. They were unbeaten in the first 3 tournaments that they participated in, capturing his second Indonesia Masters and All England Open, and also his third India Open titles. He and Gideon then defeated at the quarterfinals of Malaysia Open by Chinese pair He Jiting and Tan Qiang. In July, he and Gideon won the Indonesia Open, however, in the quarterfinals Sukamuljo felt the umpire was not fair during a match and he continued to protest, and earned him a yellow card from the umpire. At the 2018 World Championships, Sukamuljo and Gideon lost in the quarterfinals to Takeshi Kamura and Keigo Sonoda in straight games.

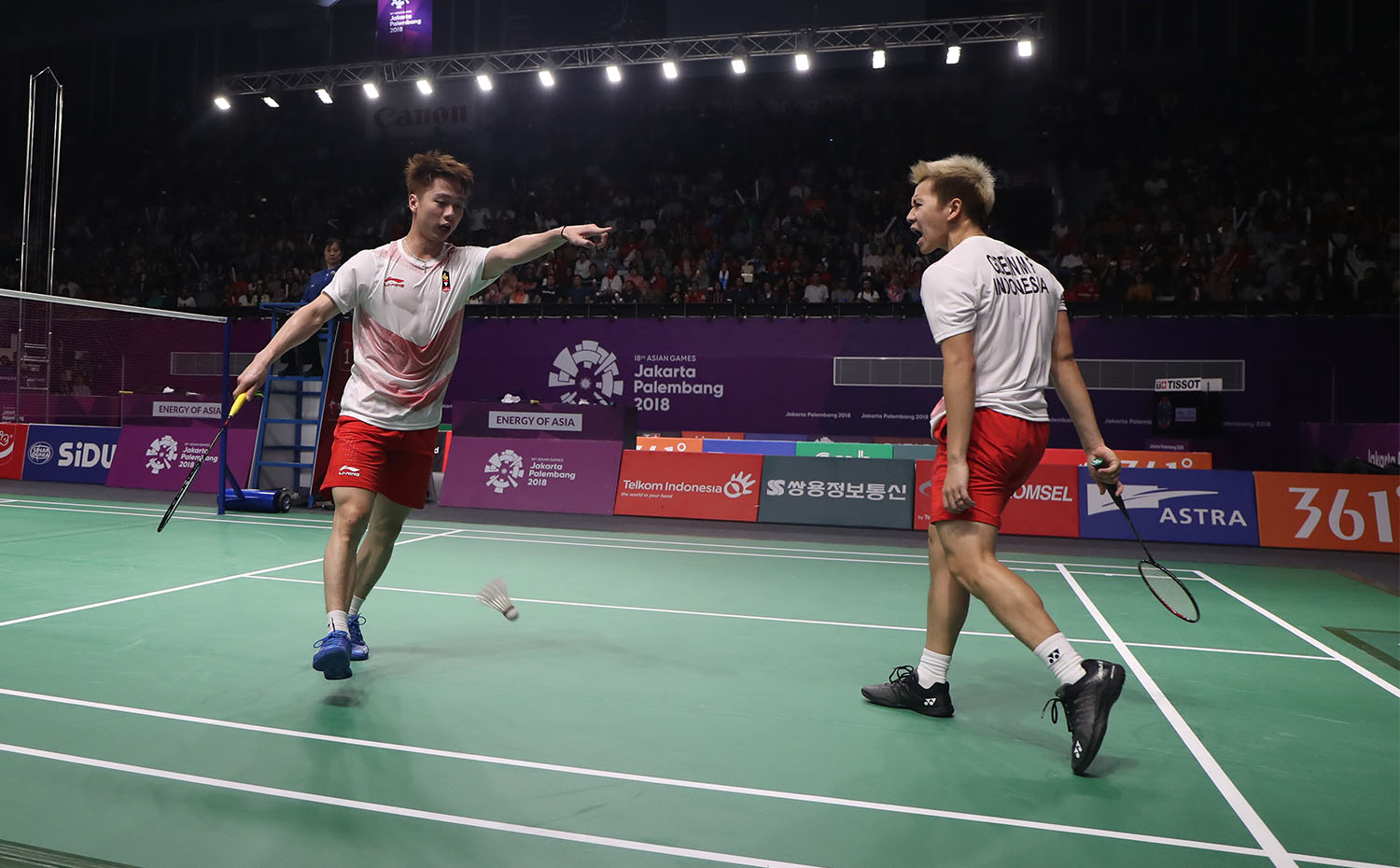
Sukamuljo and Marcus Fernaldi Gideon at the 2018 Asian Games in Jakarta

Sukamuljo competed at the 2018 Asian Games, won a silver in the team events, and then captured the men's doubles gold medal, after he and Gideon beat their compatriots Fajar Alfian and Muhammad Rian Ardianto in a close rubber games in the final. In September, he and Gideon retained their Japan Open title, defeating the reigning World Champions Li Junhui and Liu Yuchen. A week later, they finished as semifinalists in China Open, lost to Han Chengkai and Zhou Haodong of China. On the Europe tour in October, Sukamuljo and Gideon clinched the Denmark Open title. But in France, they again defeated by Han and Zhou in the final, made their head-to-head record deficit to 1–2. In November, he and Gideon won the Fuzhou China Open and Hong Kong Open. After the victory they achieved in Hong Kong, Sukamuljo and Gideon managed to set a record as the first ever men's doubles pair to win eight world tour titles in a season. At the 2018 BWF World Tour Finals gala dinner, the duo then awarded as the BWF Best Male Players of the Year for two consecutive year. As the defending champions of the World Tour Finals, Sukamuljo and Gideon had to withdraw from the competition before their last group match, due to the neck injury suffered by Gideon.

=== 2019: Eight World Tour titles ===
Sukamuljo opened the season in January by winning his second Malaysia Masters and third Indonesia Masters titles. He and Gideon reached his record 20th titles at the Superseries/Super 500 above tournaments. They later had to defeat in the early round of 2019 All England Open to Liu Cheng and Zhang Nan. In April, they lost in the quarter finals at the Malaysia Open, and in the semifinals of Singapore Open. He then played at the Asian Championships held in Wuhan, China as first seed. He and Gideon proceeded to the final, but inflicted a crushing defeat by number 5 seed Hiroyuki Endo and Yuta Watanabe. He then played with Indonesia mixed team at the Sudirman Cup held in Nanning, China. Teamed up with Gideon, they have never lost in their three matches against England, Chinese Taipei and Japan, but the team lost 1–3 in the semifinals tie against Japan.

In July, Sukamuljo successfully defended his title at the Indonesia Open, later won the Japan Open for three consecutive times alongside Gideon. They beat Mohammad Ahsan and Hendra Setiawan in straight games in the final in both events. In August, the duo managed to reaching the quarter finals of Thailand Open, but stopped by the Japanese pair Hiroyuki Endo and Yuta Watanabe. They then suffered first match loss, in the second round of Basel World Championships to Choi Sol-gyu and Seo Seung-jae of South Korea after they succumbed 21–23 in the deciding game. In September, Sukamuljo and Gideon won their third China Open title, beating Ahsan and Setiawan in the final. They next went to Korea Open, but lost in the quarter finals to Fajar Alfian and Muhammad Rian Ardianto. In October, he won his second Denmark Open and first French Open titles with Gideon. At the East Asia tour in November, he won the Fuzhou China Open, and the following week he lost in the quarter finals at the Hong Kong Open against Endo and Watanabe. He and Gideon were nominated again as the BWF Best Male Player of the Year, but this time they lost to Kento Momota of Japan. They entered the World Tour Finals as the first seed. In the group stage, they beat Li Junhui and Liu Yuchen, lost to Endo and Watanabe, and then in the last match, they won against Takeshi Kamura and Keigo Sonoda, progressed to the next round as group runners-up. In the semifinal, they again defeated by the Japanese pair Endo and Watanabe, made their head-to-head record deficit to 2–5. Sukamuljo ended the 2019 season by winning eight World Tour titles, including three in a row at Denmark, France and China.

=== 2020–2021 ===
Sukamuljo began his 2020 season by playing in the Malaysia Masters, pairing up with Marcus Fernaldi Gideon again. However, they finished in the quarter finals after losing to Fajar Alfian and Muhammad Rian Ardianto in a close rubber game. Sukamuljo later won his fourth consecutive Indonesia Masters title (third with Gideon) defeating Mohammad Ahsan and Hendra Setiawan in straight games. In February, he alongside Indonesia men's team won the Asia Team Championships held in Manila. In March, he played at the All England Open with Gideon. The duo failed to win the title after lost to Hiroyuki Endo and Yuta Watanabe in the final. This was their sixth loss in a row over Endo and Watanabe. Due to the COVID-19 pandemic, numerous tournaments on the 2020 BWF World Tour were either cancelled or rescheduled for later in the year. In June, he then took part at the PBSI home tournament partnered with Muhammad Reza Pahlevi Isfahani. The duo won four matches, but unable to accomplish their victory after lost their last match against Fajar Alfian and Yeremia Rambitan, and finished as runner-up at that tournament. Sukamuljo planned to return in the international competitions at the 2020 Asian Leg tournament in January 2021, but then he had to withdraw from the competition after testing positive for COVID-19 in December 2020.

Sukamuljo made his comeback at the All England Open in March 2021. He and Gideon had played in the first round by beating the host pair Matthew Clare and Ethan van Leeuwen in a rubber game, but later Indonesia team were forced to withdraw from the competition by BWF after the team members will self-isolate for 10 days from the date of their inbound flight after an anonym person traveling onboard tested positive for COVID-19. In July 2021, Sukamuljo competed at the 2020 Summer Olympics partnering Gideon as first seed. The duo led the group standings after won two matches and lost a match. Sukamuljo and Gideon were eliminated from the competition by Malaysian pair Aaron Chia and Soh Wooi Yik in the quarter-finals. In September–October, Sukamuljo alongside Indonesia team competed at the 2021 Sudirman Cup in Vantaa, Finland. The team advanced to the knocked-out stage, but stopped in the quarter-finals to Malaysia. In the next tournament in Aarhus, Denmark, he helped Indonesia team reached the final of the World Men's Team Championships, and the team won the 2020 Thomas Cup. In the next tournament, Sukamuljo and Gideon played at the BWF World Tour in Denmark, French, and Hylo Opens. The duo ended the tour by winning the Hylo Open. At the Indonesia badminton festival, they finished as runner-up in the Indonesia Masters and triumph in the Indonesia Open. This was their three successive victory at the Indonesia Open following on from success in 2018 and 2019. Their achievements in 2021, lead them as the first seed in the BWF World Tour Finals. The duo reached the final, but lost a well contested match to Japan's Takuro Hoki and Yugo Kobayashi in a close rubber games.

=== 2022 ===
In 2022, Sukamuljo and his partner, Gideon, started the BWF tour in the All England Open. Unfortunately, they were stopped in the semi-finals by the young compatriot, the eventual champions, Muhammad Shohibul Fikri and Bagas Maulana. Sukamuljo alongside Indonesia men's team competed at the Thomas Cup. At that tournament, he did not play with his regular partner, Gideon, who was then preparing to undergo surgery due to injuries. Indonesia was unable to defend the Cup after being defeated by India 0–3 in the final. Even though his partner, Gideon, not fully recovered, the duo returned to the tournament court in June, to compete in the Indonesia Masters and Open. At that tournament, Sukamuljo and Gideon finished as semi-finalists in the Indonesia Masters, and stopped in the second round in the Indonesia Open. Topped the BWF World rankings for 215 consecutive weeks, Gideon and Sukamuljo supremacy were dethroned by Japan's Takuro Hoki and Yugo Kobayashi on 20 September 2022. They then stepped on podium in October as runner-up of the Denmark Open, losing the final to Fajar Alfian and Muhammad Rian Ardianto.

=== 2023 ===
Sukamuljo and his partner, Gideon, started the BWF tour in the Malaysia Open, but were stopped in the second round by a Chinese pair, Liang Weikeng and Wang Chang. In the next tournament, they lost again to Liang and Wang in the quarter-finals of the India Open. They competed at the home tournament, Indonesia Masters, but retired in the second round to Chinese pair Liu Yuchen and Ou Xuanyi following the injury of Gideon. After not being seen on the international circuit since January, Sukamuljo was included in the Indonesian squad for the Sudirman Cup, but the team was eliminated in the quarter-finals. He and his partner later competed in the Malaysia Masters, but lost in the second round to 4th seeds Takuro Hoki and Yugo Kobayashi in straight games. They then reached the Thailand Open semi-finals, but lost to eventual winners Liang Weikeng and Wang Chang in straight games. Sukamuljo and Gideon later suffered a second round loss in the Singapore Open to Hoki and Kobayashi.

=== Retirement ===
On 16 May 2024, Sukamuljo announced his retirement via Instagram.

== Awards and nominations ==
Award	Year	Category	Result	Ref.
GTV Amazing Kids Favorite Awards	2023	Favorite Athlete	Nominated	
AORI	2018	Best Male Athlete with Marcus Fernaldi Gideon	Won	
BWF Awards	2017	BWF Best Male Player of the Year with Marcus Fernaldi Gideon	Won	
BWF Awards	2018	BWF Best Male Player of the Year with Marcus Fernaldi Gideon	Won	
BWF Awards	2019	BWF Best Male Player of the Year with Marcus Fernaldi Gideon	Nominated	
Forbes	2020	30 Under 30 Asia (Entertainment and Sports with Marcus Fernaldi Gideon)	Placed	
Forbes	2020	30 Under 30 Indonesia (Young achievers & game changers with Marcus Fernaldi Gideon)	Placed	
Google	2018	Top Trending Searches on Google Indonesia 2018	Placed	
Golden Award SIWO PWI	2019	Best Male Athlete with Marcus Fernaldi Gideon	Won	
Golden Award SIWO PWI	2019	Favorite Team with 2018 Asian Games men's badminton team	Nominated	
Golden Award SIWO PWI	2020	Favorite Male Athlete with Marcus Fernaldi Gideon	Won	
Indonesian Sport Awards	2018	Athlete of the Year with Marcus Fernaldi Gideon	Won	
Indonesian Sport Awards	2018	Favorite Male Athlete Duos with Marcus Fernaldi Gideon	Won	

== Achievements ==
=== Asian Games ===
Men's doubles
Year	Venue	Partner	Opponent	Score	Result	Ref.
2018	Istora Gelora Bung Karno; Jakarta, Indonesia	(Indonesia) Marcus Fernaldi Gideon	(Indonesia) Fajar Alfian (Indonesia) Muhammad Rian Ardianto	13–21, 21–18, 24–22	Gold	

=== Asian Championships ===
Men's doubles
Year	Venue	Partner	Opponent	Score	Result	Ref.
2019	Wuhan Sports Center Gymnasium; Wuhan, China	(Indonesia) Marcus Fernaldi Gideon	(Japan) Hiroyuki Endo (Japan) Yuta Watanabe	18–21, 3–21	Silver	

=== SEA Games ===
Men's doubles
Year	Venue	Partner	Opponent	Score	Result	Ref.
2015	Singapore Indoor Stadium; Singapore	(Indonesia) Marcus Fernaldi Gideon	(Indonesia) Angga Pratama (Indonesia) Ricky Karanda Suwardi	12–21, 22–24	Silver	

=== ASEAN University Games ===
Men's doubles
Year	Venue	Partner	Opponent	Score	Result	Ref.
2014	Dempo Sports Hall; Palembang, Indonesia	(Indonesia) Arya Maulana Aldiartama	(Malaysia) Vountus Indra Mawan (Malaysia) Jagdish Singh	21–11, 18–21, 21–19	Gold	

=== BWF World Junior Championships ===
Mixed doubles
Year	Venue	Partner	Opponent	Score	Result	Ref.
2013	Hua Mark Indoor Stadium; Bangkok, Thailand	(Indonesia) Masita Mahmudin	(China) Huang Kaixiang (China) Chen Qingchen	18–21, 22–20, 21–23	Silver	

=== Asian Junior Championships ===
Boys' doubles
Year	Venue	Partner	Opponent	Score	Result	Ref.
2012	Gimcheon Indoor Stadium; Gimcheon, South Korea	(Indonesia) Alfian Eko Prasetya	(Chinese Taipei) Wang Chi-lin (Chinese Taipei) Wu Hsiao-lin	20–22, 13–21	Bronze	
2013	Likas Indoor Stadium; Kota Kinabalu, Malaysia	(Indonesia) Arya Maulana Aldiartama	(China) Li Junhui (China) Liu Yuchen	16–21, 12–21	Bronze	

=== BWF World Tour (19 titles, 6 runners-up) ===
The BWF World Tour, which was announced on 19 March 2017 and implemented in 2018, is a series of elite badminton tournaments sanctioned by the Badminton World Federation (BWF). The BWF World Tour is divided into levels of World Tour Finals, Super 1000, Super 750, Super 500, Super 300 (part of the HSBC World Tour), and the BWF Tour Super 100.

Men's doubles
Year	Tournament	Level	Partner	Opponent	Score	Result	Ref.
2018	Indonesia Masters	Super 500	(Indonesia) Marcus Fernaldi Gideon	(China) Li Junhui (China) Liu Yuchen	11–21, 21–10, 21–16	(gold) Winner	
2018	India Open	Super 500	(Indonesia) Marcus Fernaldi Gideon	(Denmark) Kim Astrup (Denmark) Anders Skaarup Rasmussen	21–14, 21–16	(gold) Winner	
2018	All England Open	Super 1000	(Indonesia) Marcus Fernaldi Gideon	(Denmark) Mathias Boe (Denmark) Carsten Mogensen	21–18, 21–17	(gold) Winner	
2018	Indonesia Open	Super 1000	(Indonesia) Marcus Fernaldi Gideon	(Japan) Takuto Inoue (Japan) Yuki Kaneko	21–13, 21–16	(gold) Winner	
2018	Japan Open	Super 750	(Indonesia) Marcus Fernaldi Gideon	(China) Li Junhui (China) Liu Yuchen	21–11, 21–13	(gold) Winner	
2018	Denmark Open	Super 750	(Indonesia) Marcus Fernaldi Gideon	(Japan) Takeshi Kamura (Japan) Keigo Sonoda	21–15, 21–16	(gold) Winner	
2018	French Open	Super 750	(Indonesia) Marcus Fernaldi Gideon	(China) Han Chengkai (China) Zhou Haodong	21–23, 21–8, 17–21	(silver) Runner-up	
2018	Fuzhou China Open	Super 750	(Indonesia) Marcus Fernaldi Gideon	(China) He Jiting (China) Tan Qiang	25–27, 21–17, 21–15	(gold) Winner	
2018	Hong Kong Open	Super 500	(Indonesia) Marcus Fernaldi Gideon	(Japan) Takeshi Kamura (Japan) Keigo Sonoda	21–13, 21–12	(gold) Winner	
2019	Malaysia Masters	Super 500	(Indonesia) Marcus Fernaldi Gideon	(Malaysia) Ong Yew Sin (Malaysia) Teo Ee Yi	21–15, 21–16	(gold) Winner	
2019	Indonesia Masters	Super 500	(Indonesia) Marcus Fernaldi Gideon	(Indonesia) Mohammad Ahsan (Indonesia) Hendra Setiawan	21–17, 21–11	(gold) Winner	
2019	Indonesia Open	Super 1000	(Indonesia) Marcus Fernaldi Gideon	(Indonesia) Mohammad Ahsan (Indonesia) Hendra Setiawan	21–19, 21–16	(gold) Winner	
2019	Japan Open	Super 750	(Indonesia) Marcus Fernaldi Gideon	(Indonesia) Mohammad Ahsan (Indonesia) Hendra Setiawan	21–18, 23–21	(gold) Winner	
2019	China Open	Super 1000	(Indonesia) Marcus Fernaldi Gideon	(Indonesia) Mohammad Ahsan (Indonesia) Hendra Setiawan	21–18, 17–21, 21–15	(gold) Winner	
2019	Denmark Open	Super 750	(Indonesia) Marcus Fernaldi Gideon	(Indonesia) Mohammad Ahsan (Indonesia) Hendra Setiawan	21–14, 21–13	(gold) Winner	
2019	French Open	Super 750	(Indonesia) Marcus Fernaldi Gideon	(India) Satwiksairaj Rankireddy (India) Chirag Shetty	21–18, 21–16	(gold) Winner	
2019	Fuzhou China Open	Super 750	(Indonesia) Marcus Fernaldi Gideon	(Japan) Takeshi Kamura (Japan) Keigo Sonoda	21–17, 21–9	(gold) Winner	
2020	Indonesia Masters	Super 500	(Indonesia) Marcus Fernaldi Gideon	(Indonesia) Mohammad Ahsan (Indonesia) Hendra Setiawan	21–15, 21–16	(gold) Winner	
2020	All England Open	Super 1000	(Indonesia) Marcus Fernaldi Gideon	(Japan) Hiroyuki Endo (Japan) Yuta Watanabe	18–21, 21–12, 19–21	(silver) Runner-up	
2021	French Open	Super 750	(Indonesia) Marcus Fernaldi Gideon	(South Korea) Ko Sung-hyun (South Korea) Shin Baek-cheol	17–21, 20–22	(silver) Runner-up	
2021	Hylo Open	Super 500	(Indonesia) Marcus Fernaldi Gideon	(Indonesia) Leo Rolly Carnando (Indonesia) Daniel Marthin	21–14, 21–19	(gold) Winner	
2021	Indonesia Masters	Super 750	(Indonesia) Marcus Fernaldi Gideon	(Japan) Takuro Hoki (Japan) Yugo Kobayashi	11–21, 21–17, 19–21	(silver) Runner-up	
2021	Indonesia Open	Super 1000	(Indonesia) Marcus Fernaldi Gideon	(Japan) Takuro Hoki (Japan) Yugo Kobayashi	21–14, 21–18	(gold) Winner	
2021	BWF World Tour Finals	World Tour Finals	(Indonesia) Marcus Fernaldi Gideon	(Japan) Takuro Hoki (Japan) Yugo Kobayashi	16–21, 21–13, 17–21	(silver) Runner-up	
2022	Denmark Open	Super 750	(Indonesia) Marcus Fernaldi Gideon	(Indonesia) Fajar Alfian (Indonesia) Muhammad Rian Ardianto	19–21, 26–28	(silver) Runner-up	

=== BWF Superseries (10 titles, 2 runners-up) ===
The BWF Superseries, which was launched on 14 December 2006 and implemented in 2007, was a series of elite badminton tournaments, sanctioned by the Badminton World Federation (BWF). BWF Superseries levels were Superseries and Superseries Premier. A season of Superseries consisted of twelve tournaments around the world that had been introduced since 2011. Successful players were invited to the Superseries Finals, which were held at the end of each year.

Men's doubles
Year	Tournament	Partner	Opponent	Score	Result	Ref.
2016	India Open	(Indonesia) Marcus Fernaldi Gideon	(Indonesia) Angga Pratama (Indonesia) Ricky Karanda Suwardi	21–17, 21–13	(gold) Winner	
2016	Australian Open	(Indonesia) Marcus Fernaldi Gideon	(Indonesia) Angga Pratama (Indonesia) Ricky Karanda Suwardi	21–14, 21–15	(gold) Winner	
2016	China Open	(Indonesia) Marcus Fernaldi Gideon	(Denmark) Mathias Boe (Denmark) Carsten Mogensen	21–18, 22–20	(gold) Winner	
2017	All England Open	(Indonesia) Marcus Fernaldi Gideon	(China) Li Junhui (China) Liu Yuchen	21–19, 21–14	(gold) Winner	
2017	India Open	(Indonesia) Marcus Fernaldi Gideon	(Indonesia) Angga Pratama (Indonesia) Ricky Karanda Suwardi	21–11, 21–15	(gold) Winner	
2017	Malaysia Open	(Indonesia) Marcus Fernaldi Gideon	(China) Fu Haifeng (China) Zheng Siwei	21–14, 14–21, 21–12	(gold) Winner	
2017	Korea Open	(Indonesia) Marcus Fernaldi Gideon	(Denmark) Mathias Boe (Denmark) Carsten Mogensen	19–21, 21–19, 15–21	(silver) Runner-up	
2017	Japan Open	(Indonesia) Marcus Fernaldi Gideon	(Japan) Takuto Inoue (Japan) Yuki Kaneko	21–12, 21–15	(gold) Winner	
2017	Denmark Open	(Indonesia) Marcus Fernaldi Gideon	(China) Liu Cheng (China) Zhang Nan	16–21, 24–22, 19–21	(silver) Runner-up	
2017	China Open	(Indonesia) Marcus Fernaldi Gideon	(Denmark) Mathias Boe (Denmark) Carsten Mogensen	21–19, 21–11	(gold) Winner	
2017	Hong Kong Open	(Indonesia) Marcus Fernaldi Gideon	(Denmark) Mads Conrad-Petersen (Denmark) Mads Pieler Kolding	21–12, 21–18	(gold) Winner	
2017	Dubai World Superseries Finals	(Indonesia) Marcus Fernaldi Gideon	(China) Liu Cheng (China) Zhang Nan	21–16, 21–15	(gold) Winner	

BWF Super Series Finals tournament
BWF Super Series Premier tournament
BWF Super Series tournament

=== BWF Grand Prix (4 titles, 2 runners-up) ===
The BWF Grand Prix had two levels, the Grand Prix and Grand Prix Gold. It was a series of badminton tournaments sanctioned by the Badminton World Federation (BWF) and played between 2007 and 2017.

Men's doubles
Year	Tournament	Partner	Opponent	Score	Result	Ref.
2014	New Zealand Open	(Indonesia) Selvanus Geh	(Chinese Taipei) Chen Hung-ling (Chinese Taipei) Lu Chia-pin	15–21, 23–21, 21–11	(gold) Winner	
2014	Indonesian Masters	(Indonesia) Selvanus Geh	(Indonesia) Marcus Fernaldi Gideon (Indonesia) Markis Kido	17–21, 22–20, 14–21	(silver) Runner-up	
2015	Chinese Taipei Open	(Indonesia) Marcus Fernaldi Gideon	(China) Fu Haifeng (China) Zhang Nan	13–21, 8–21	(silver) Runner-up	
2015	Chinese Taipei Masters	(Indonesia) Marcus Fernaldi Gideon	(Malaysia) Hoon Thien How (Malaysia) Lim Khim Wah	21–12, 21–8	(gold) Winner	
2016	Malaysia Masters	(Indonesia) Marcus Fernaldi Gideon	(Malaysia) Koo Kien Keat (Malaysia) Tan Boon Heong	18–21, 21–13, 21–18	(gold) Winner	
2016	Indonesia Masters	(Indonesia) Wahyu Nayaka	(China) Han Chengkai (China) Zhou Haodong	21–16, 21–18	(gold) Winner	

BWF Grand Prix Gold tournament
BWF Grand Prix tournament

=== BWF International Challenge/Series (2 titles, 1 runner-up) ===
Men's doubles
Year	Tournament	Partner	Opponent	Score	Result	Ref.
2011	Singapore International	(Indonesia) Lukhi Apri Nugroho	(Indonesia) Marcus Fernaldi Gideon (Indonesia) Agripina Pamungkas	17–21, 9–21	(silver) Runner-up	
2014	Vietnam International	(Indonesia) Selvanus Geh	(Australia) Robin Middleton (Australia) Ross Smith	21–14, 21–13	(gold) Winner	
2014	Bulgarian International	(Indonesia) Selvanus Geh	(Indonesia) Ronald Alexander (Indonesia) Edi Subaktiar	21–19, 21–13	(gold) Winner	

BWF International Challenge tournament
BWF International Series tournament

=== BWF Junior International (1 title, 1 runner-up) ===
Boys' doubles
Year	Tournament	Partner	Opponent	Score	Result	Ref.
2012	Indonesia Junior International	(Indonesia) Rafiddias Akhdan Nugroho	(Indonesia) Hafiz Faizal (Indonesia) Putra Eka Rhoma	20–22, 12–21	(silver) Runner-up	

Mixed doubles
Year	Tournament	Partner	Opponent	Score	Result	Ref.
2013	Indonesia Junior International	(Indonesia) Masita Mahmudin	(Indonesia) Ricky Alverino Sidarta (Indonesia) Ristya Ayu Nugraheny	21–19, 21–10	(gold) Winner	

BWF Junior International Grand Prix tournament
BWF Junior International Challenge tournament
BWF Junior International Series tournament
BWF Junior Future Series tournament

== Performance timeline ==
Key

W	Won	F	Finalist	SF	Semi-finalist
QF	Quarter-finalist	#R	Rounds 4, 3, 2, 1	RR	Round-robin stage
Q#	Qualification round	A	Absent	w/d	Withdrew
G	Gold	S	Silver	B	Bronze
NH	Not held	N/A	Not applicable	DNQ	Did not qualify

=== National team ===
- Junior level

Team events	2011	2012	2013	Ref
Asian Junior Championships	A	QF	B	
World Junior Championships	7th	4th	S	

- Senior level

Team events	2015	2016	2017	2018	2019	2020	2021	2022	2023	Ref
SEA Games	G	NH	A	NH	A	NH	A	NH	A	
Asia Team Championships	NH	A	NH	G	NH	G	NH	A	NH	
Asian Games	NH			S	NH			A	NH	
Thomas Cup	NH	S	NH	B	NH	G	NH	S	NH	
Sudirman Cup	B	NH	RR	NH	B	NH	QF	NH	QF	

=== Individual competitions ===
==== Junior level ====
===== Boys' doubles =====
Events	2011	2012	2013	Ref
Asian Junior Championships	A	B	B	
World Junior Championships	QF	3R	QF	

===== Mixed doubles =====
Events	2012	2013	Ref
World Junior Championships	4R	S	

==== Senior level ====
In the senior level tournament, Sukamuljo won gold medal in the 2018 Asian Games, and also won 33 individual titles in the BWF tour equivalent events.

===== Men's doubles =====
Events	2015	2016	2017	2018	2019	2020	2021	2022	2023	Ref
SEA Games	S	NH	A	NH	A	NH	A	NH	A	
Asian Championships	A	QF	w/d	A	S	NH		A		
Asian Games	NH			G	NH			A	NH	
World Championships	A	NH	QF	QF	2R	NH	w/d	3R	DNQ	
Olympic Games	NH	DNQ	NH			QF	NH			

Tournament	BWF Superseries / Grand Prix								BWF World Tour						Best	Ref
Tournament	2010	2011	2012	2013	2014	2015	2016	2017	2018	2019	2020	2021	2022	2023	Best	Ref
Malaysia Open	A					1R	2R	W	QF	QF	NH		w/d	2R	W ('17)	
India Open	A						W	W	W	A	NH		A	QF	W ('16, '17, '18)	
Indonesia Masters	Q2	Q2	1R	2R	F	QF	W	NH	W	W	W	F	SF	2R	W ('16, '18, '19, '20)	
Thailand Masters	NH						2R	A				NH		A	2R ('16)	
All England Open	A					QF	1R	W	W	1R	F	2R	SF	A	W ('17, '18)	
Swiss Open	A					SF	A				NH	A			SF ('15)	
Malaysia Masters	A			1R	A		W	A		W	QF	NH	w/d	2R	W ('16, '19)	
Thailand Open	NH	A			NH	SF	A			QF	w/d	NH	A	SF	SF ('15, '23)	
Thailand Open	NH	A			NH	SF	A			QF	w/d	NH	A	SF	SF ('15, '23)	
Singapore Open	A					2R	QF	SF	A	SF	NH		w/d	2R	SF ('17, '19)	
Indonesia Open	A		Q2	A	2R	2R	2R	1R	W	W	NH	W	2R	A	W ('18, '19, '21)	
Chinese Taipei Open	A				QF	F	A				NH		A		F ('15)	
Korea Open	A					1R	A	F	A	QF	NH		w/d	A	F ('17)	
Japan Open	A					1R	A	W	W	W	NH		2R	A	W ('17, '18, '19)	
Australian Open	A						W	w/d	A		NH		A		W ('16)	
China Open	A						W	W	SF	W	NH			A	W ('16, '17, '19)	
Hong Kong Open	A					QF	1R	W	W	QF	NH			A	W ('17, '18)	
Vietnam Open	A				2R	SF	A				NH		A		SF ('15)	
Denmark Open	A						QF	F	W	W	A	2R	F	A	W ('18, '19)	
French Open	A						2R	w/d	F	W	NH	F	1R	A	W ('19)	
Hylo Open	A											W	A		W ('21)	
Korea Masters	A					2R	A				NH		A	2R	2R ('15, '23)	
Japan Masters	NH													2R	2R ('23)	
China Masters	A					1R	A		W	W	NH			A	W ('18, '19)	
Syed Modi International	A			NH	A		2R	A			NH		A		2R ('16)	
Superseries / World Tour Finals	DNQ						RR	W	RR	SF	DNQ	F	DNQ		W ('17)	
Chinese Taipei Masters	NH					W	A	NH							W ('15)	
Dutch Open	A				1R	A					NH	N/A			1R ('14)	
Macau Open	A					2R	A				NH				2R ('15)	
New Zealand Open	NH	N/A	NH	A	W	A	SF	A			NH				W ('14)	
Year-end ranking	381	187	294	218	37	16	2	1	1	1	1	1	23	39	1	
Tournament	2010	2011	2012	2013	2014	2015	2016	2017	2018	2019	2020	2021	2022	2023	Best	Ref

===== Mixed doubles =====
Tournament	BWF Superseries / Grand Prix				Best	Ref
Tournament	2013	2014	2015	2016	Best	Ref
All England Open	A		2R	A	2R ('15)	
Malaysia Masters	A			2R	2R ('16)	
Chinese Taipei Open	A	1R	A		1R ('14)	
Vietnam Open	A	2R	A		2R ('14)	
Dutch Open	A	1R	A		1R ('14)	
Indonesia Masters	1R	2R	A		2R ('14)	
Indonesia Open	A	2R	A		2R ('14)	
Year-end ranking	536	183	238	316	110	
Tournament	2013	2014	2015	2016	Best	Ref

== Record against selected opponents ==
Record against year-end Finals finalists, World Championships semi-finalists, and Olympic quarter-finalists.

=== Marcus Fernaldi Gideon ===
Kevin Sanjaya Sukamuljo and Marcus Fernaldi Gideon lead the meeting record with a wide margin against Satwiksairaj Rankireddy and Chirag Shetty of India, Li Junhui and Liu Yuchen of China, and their senior compatriots Mohammad Ahsan and Hendra Setiawan. Meanwhile, Sukamuljo and Gideon have a poor head-to-head record against Liang Weikeng and Wang Chang (0–4), Hiroyuki Endo and Yuta Watanabe (2–6), Lee Yong-dae and Yoo Yeon-seong (0–3), and also Fu Haifeng and Zhang Nan (1–3).

Players	M	W	L	Diff.
(China) Chai Biao & Hong Wei	5	3	2	+1
(China) Fu Haifeng & Zhang Nan	4	1	3	–2
(China) He Jiting & Tan Qiang	8	7	1	+6
(China) Li Junhui & Liu Yuchen	13	11	2	+9
(China) Liang Weikeng & Wang Chang	4	0	4	–4
(China) Liu Cheng & Zhang Nan	7	5	2	+3
(China) Liu Xiaolong & Qiu Zihan	1	1	0	+1
(China) Liu Yuchen & Ou Xuanyi	1	0	1	–1
(Chinese Taipei) Chen Hung-ling & Wang Chi-lin	5	5	0	+5
(Chinese Taipei) Lee Yang & Wang Chi-lin	6	5	1	+4
(Denmark) Kim Astrup & Anders Skaarup Rasmussen	9	8	1	+7
(Denmark) Mathias Boe & Carsten Mogensen	9	5	4	+1
(England) Marcus Ellis & Chris Langridge	5	5	0	+5
(India) Satwiksairaj Rankireddy & Chirag Shetty	11	11	0	+11
(Indonesia) Mohammad Ahsan & Hendra Setiawan	13	11	2	+9
(Indonesia) Fajar Alfian & Muhammad Rian Ardianto	10	6	4	+2

Players	M	W	L	Diff.
(Japan) Hiroyuki Endo & Kenichi Hayakawa	1	0	1	–1
(Japan) Hiroyuki Endo & Yuta Watanabe	8	2	6	–4
(Japan) Takuro Hoki & Yugo Kobayashi	15	11	4	+7
(Japan) Takeshi Kamura & Keigo Sonoda	16	11	5	+6
(Malaysia) Aaron Chia & Soh Wooi Yik	11	9	2	+7
(Malaysia) Goh Sze Fei & Nur Izzuddin	2	2	0	+2
(Malaysia) Goh V Shem & Tan Wee Kiong	8	7	1	+6
(Malaysia) Koo Kien Keat & Tan Boon Heong	3	3	0	+3
(Malaysia) Ong Yew Sin & Teo Ee Yi	7	7	0	+7
(Russia) Vladimir Ivanov & Ivan Sozonov	7	7	0	+7
(South Korea) Kang Min-hyuk & Seo Seung-jae	3	2	1	+1
(South Korea) Kim Gi-jung & Kim Sa-rang	2	1	1	0
(South Korea) Ko Sung-hyun & Shin Baek-cheol	4	2	2	0
(South Korea) Lee Yong-dae & Yoo Yeon-seong	3	0	3	–3
(Thailand) Supak Jomkoh & Kittinupong Kedren	3	3	0	+3
