= Arya Maulana Aldiartama =

Indonesian badminton player (born 1995)

Personal information
- Born: 30 September 1995 (age 31) Surakarta, Central Java, Indonesia
- Height: 1.71 m (5 ft 7 in)
- Weight: 66 kg (146 lb)

Sport
- Country: Indonesia
- Sport: Badminton
- Handedness: Right

Men's doubles
- Highest ranking: 133 (4 October 2012)
- BWF profile
Medal record
Men's badminton
Representing Indonesia
World Junior Championships
Silver medal – second place	2013 Bangkok	Mixed team
Asian Junior Championships
Gold medal – first place	2012 Gimcheon	Boys' doubles
Bronze medal – third place	2013 Kota Kinabalu	Boys' doubles
Bronze medal – third place	2013 Kota Kinabalu	Mixed team

Arya Maulana Aldiartama (born 30 September 1995) is an Indonesian badminton affiliated with PMS Solo club. Previously, he was a member of Djarum club, and has joined the club in 2009.

== Achievements ==
=== ASEAN University Games ===
Men's doubles
Year	Venue	Partner	Opponent	Score	Result	Ref.
2014	Dempo Sports Hall; Palembang, Indonesia	(Indonesia) Kevin Sanjaya Sukamuljo	(Malaysia) Vountus Indra Mawan (Malaysia) Jagdish Singh	21–11, 18–21, 21–19	Gold	

=== Asian Junior Championships ===
Boys' doubles
Year	Venue	Partner	Opponent	Score	Result
2012	Gimcheon Indoor Stadium; Gimcheon, South Korea	(Indonesia) Edi Subaktiar	(Chinese Taipei) Wang Chi-lin (Chinese Taipei) Wu Hsiao-lin	17–21, 22–20, 21–10	Gold
2013	Likas Indoor Stadium; Kota Kinabalu, Malaysia	(Indonesia) Kevin Sanjaya Sukamuljo	(China) Li Junhui (China) Liu Yuchen	16–21, 12–21	Bronze

=== BWF International Challenge/Series (2 runners-up) ===
Men's doubles
Year	Tournament	Partner	Opponent	Score	Result
2012	Banuinvest International	(Indonesia) Edi Subaktiar	(France) Laurent Constantin (France) Sébastien Vincent	18–21, 22–20, 17–21	(silver) Runner-up
2013	Maldives International	(Indonesia) Alfian Eko Prasetya	(Chinese Taipei) Tien Tzu-chieh (Chinese Taipei) Wang Chi-lin	15–21, 17–21	(silver) Runner-up

BWF International Challenge tournament
BWF International Series tournament

=== BWF Junior International (2 titles) ===
Boys' doubles
Year	Tournament	Partner	Opponent	Score	Result	Ref.
2011	Indonesia Junior International	(Indonesia) Edi Subaktiar	(South Korea) Kim Dong-joo (South Korea) Lee Hong-je	21–13, 20–22, 28–26	(gold) Winner	
2012	Malaysia Junior International	(Indonesia) Edi Subaktiar	(Indonesia) Hafiz Faizal (Indonesia) Putra Eka Rhoma	21–19, 21–12	(gold) Winner	

BWF Junior International Grand Prix tournament
BWF Junior International Challenge tournament
BWF Junior International Series tournament
BWF Junior Future Series tournament
