= Li Junhui =

Chinese badminton player (born 1995)

Li Junhui 李俊慧
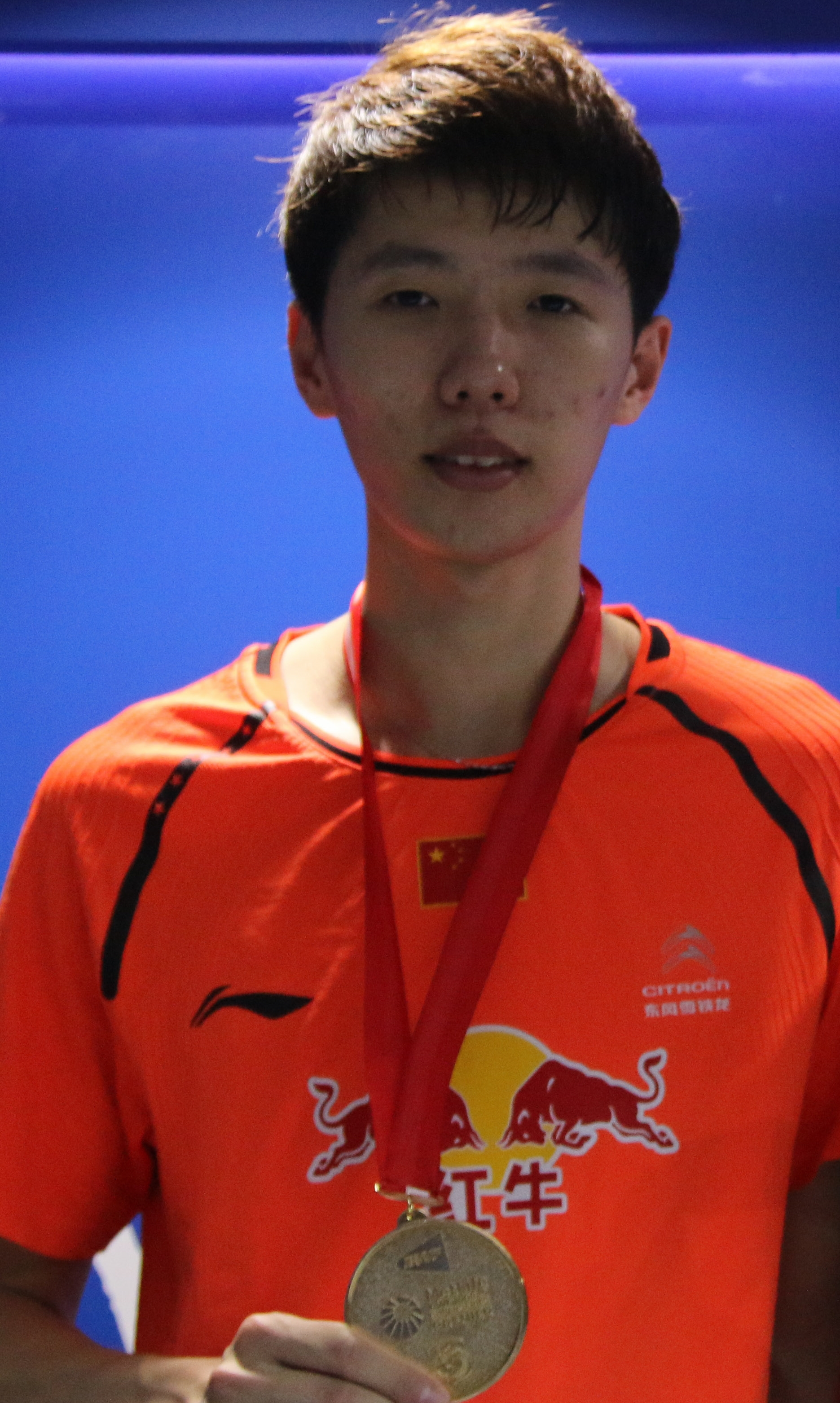
- Li in 2017

Personal information
- Born: 10 May 1995 (age 31) Anshan, Liaoning, China
- Years active: 2012–2021
- Height: 1.95 m (6 ft 5 in)

Sport
- Country: China
- Sport: Badminton
- Handedness: Right
- Retired: 12 November 2021

Men's doubles
- Highest ranking: 1 (with Liu Yuchen 6 April 2017)
- BWF profile
Medal record
Men's badminton
Representing China
Olympic Games
Silver medal – second place	2020 Tokyo	Men's doubles
World Championships
Gold medal – first place	2018 Nanjing	Men's doubles
Bronze medal – third place	2019 Basel	Men's doubles
Sudirman Cup
Gold medal – first place	2019 Nanning	Mixed team
Silver medal – second place	2017 Gold Coast	Mixed team
Thomas Cup
Gold medal – first place	2018 Bangkok	Men's team
Asian Games
Gold medal – first place	2018 Jakarta–Palembang	Men's team
Bronze medal – third place	2018 Jakarta–Palembang	Men's doubles
Asian Championships
Gold medal – first place	2017 Wuhan	Men's doubles
Gold medal – first place	2018 Wuhan	Men's doubles
Silver medal – second place	2014 Gimcheon	Men's doubles
Silver medal – second place	2016 Wuhan	Men's doubles
Asia Mixed Team Championships
Bronze medal – third place	2017 Ho Chi Minh	Mixed team
World Junior Championships
Gold medal – first place	2012 Chiba	Mixed team
Gold medal – first place	2013 Bangkok	Boys' doubles
Bronze medal – third place	2013 Bangkok	Mixed team
Asia Junior Championships
Gold medal – first place	2011 Lucknow	Mixed team
Gold medal – first place	2013 Kota Kinabalu	Boys' doubles
Gold medal – first place	2013 Kota Kinabalu	Mixed team

Li Junhui (Chinese: 李俊慧, born 10 May 1995) is a Chinese badminton player. He was the gold medalist at the 2018 World Championships in the men's doubles event partnered with Liu Yuchen, two times won the gold medal at the Asian Championships in 2017 and 2018, and was a silver medalist at the 2020 Summer Olympics. Li was part of the national team that won the 2018 Asian Games, 2018 Thomas Cup, and 2019 Sudirman Cup.

== Career ==
Li began his professional badminton career representing China in men’s doubles. Over the course of his career, he became known as a skilled front-court player with strong defensive ability and sharp net play.

He partnered with Liu Yuchen to form one of China’s top men’s doubles pairs. The duo achieved consistent success on the Badminton World Federation (BWF) World Tour, winning several Superseries and World Tour titles, and earning a reputation as one of the strongest pairings in international badminton.

At the 2020 Summer Olympics in Tokyo, Li and Liu reached the men’s doubles final. Despite strong performances throughout the tournament, they were defeated in the gold medal match by Lee Yang and Wang Chi-lin of Chinese Taipei, finishing with the silver medal.

After the Olympics, Li continued to compete but was hampered by recurring injuries that had affected him since 2017. In November 2021, he officially announced his retirement from professional badminton, citing his inability to fully recover and maintain top form.

== Achievements ==
=== Olympic Games ===
Men's doubles
Year	Venue	Partner	Opponent	Score	Result
2020	Musashino Forest Sport Plaza; Tokyo, Japan	(China) Liu Yuchen	(Chinese Taipei) Lee Yang (Chinese Taipei) Wang Chi-lin	18–21, 12–21	Silver

=== BWF World Championships ===
Men's doubles
Year	Venue	Partner	Opponent	Score	Result
2018	Nanjing Youth Olympic Sports Park; Nanjing, China	(China) Liu Yuchen	(Japan) Takeshi Kamura (Japan) Keigo Sonoda	21–12, 21–19	Gold
2019	St. Jakobshalle; Basel, Switzerland	(China) Liu Yuchen	(Japan) Takuro Hoki (Japan) Yugo Kobayashi	19–21, 13–21	Bronze

=== Asian Games ===
Men's doubles
Year	Venue	Partner	Opponent	Score	Result
2018	Istora Gelora Bung Karno; Jakarta, Indonesia	(China) Liu Yuchen	(Indonesia) Fajar Alfian (Indonesia) Muhammad Rian Ardianto	14–21, 21–19, 13–21	Bronze

=== Asian Championships ===
Men's doubles
Year	Venue	Partner	Opponent	Score	Result
2014	Gimcheon Indoor Stadium; Gimcheon, South Korea	(China) Liu Yuchen	(South Korea) Shin Baek-cheol (South Korea) Yoo Yeon-seong	20–22, 17–21	Silver
2016	Wuhan Sports Center Gymnasium; Wuhan, China	(China) Liu Yuchen	(South Korea) Lee Yong-dae (South Korea) Yoo Yeon-seong	14–21, 26–28	Silver
2017	Wuhan Sports Center Gymnasium; Wuhan, China	(China) Liu Yuchen	(China) Huang Kaixiang (China) Wang Yilyu	21–14, 21–12	Gold
2018	Wuhan Sports Center Gymnasium; Wuhan, China	(China) Liu Yuchen	(Japan) Takeshi Kamura (Japan) Keigo Sonoda	11–21, 21–10, 21–13	Gold

=== BWF World Junior Championships ===
Boys' doubles
Year	Venue	Partner	Opponent	Score	Result
2013	Hua Mark Indoor Stadium; Bangkok, Thailand	(China) Liu Yuchen	(China) Huang Kaixiang (China) Zheng Siwei	14–21, 21–13, 22–20	Gold

=== Asian Junior Championships ===
Boys' doubles
Year	Venue	Partner	Opponent	Score	Result
2013	Likas Indoor Stadium; Kota Kinabalu, Malaysia	(China) Liu Yuchen	(China) Huang Kaixiang (China) Zheng Siwei	21–15, 21–14	Gold

=== BWF World Tour (3 titles, 4 runners-up) ===
The BWF World Tour, which was announced on 19 March 2017, and implemented in 2018, is a series of elite badminton tournaments sanctioned by the Badminton World Federation (BWF). The BWF World Tour is divided into levels of World Tour Finals, Super 1000, Super 750, Super 500, Super 300 (part of the HSBC World Tour), and the BWF Tour Super 100.

Men's doubles
Year	Tournament	Level	Partner	Opponent	Score	Result
2018	Indonesia Masters	Super 500	(China) Liu Yuchen	(Indonesia) Marcus Fernaldi Gideon (Indonesia) Kevin Sanjaya Sukamuljo	21–11, 10–21, 16–21	(silver) Runner-up
2018	Japan Open	Super 750	(China) Liu Yuchen	(Indonesia) Marcus Fernaldi Gideon (Indonesia) Kevin Sanjaya Sukamuljo	11–21, 13–21	(silver) Runner-up
2018	BWF World Tour Finals	World Tour Finals	(China) Liu Yuchen	(Japan) Hiroyuki Endo (Japan) Yuta Watanabe	21–15, 21–11	(gold) Winner
2019	Malaysia Open	Super 750	(China) Liu Yuchen	(Japan) Takeshi Kamura (Japan) Keigo Sonoda	21–12, 21–17	(gold) Winner
2019	Thailand Open	Super 500	(China) Liu Yuchen	(India) Satwiksairaj Rankireddy (India) Chirag Shetty	19–21, 21–18, 18–21	(silver) Runner-up
2019	Macau Open	Super 300	(China) Liu Yuchen	(China) Huang Kaixiang (China) Liu Cheng	21–8, 18–21, 22–20	(gold) Winner
2020	Malaysia Masters	Super 500	(China) Liu Yuchen	(South Korea) Kim Gi-jung (South Korea) Lee Yong-dae	14–21, 16–21	(silver) Runner-up

=== BWF Superseries (2 titles, 3 runners-up) ===
The BWF Superseries, which was launched on 14 December 2006, and implemented in 2007, was a series of elite badminton tournaments, sanctioned by the Badminton World Federation (BWF). BWF Superseries levels were Superseries and Superseries Premier. A season of Superseries consisted of 12 tournaments around the world that had been introduced since 2011. Successful players were invited to the Superseries Finals, which were held at the end of each year.

Men's doubles
Year	Tournament	Partner	Opponent	Score	Result
2016	Japan Open	(China) Liu Yuchen	(South Korea) Kim Gi-jung (South Korea) Ko Sung-hyun	21–12, 21–12	(gold) Winner
2016	Korea Open	(China) Liu Yuchen	(South Korea) Lee Yong-dae (South Korea) Yoo Yeon-seong	21–15, 20–22, 18–21	(silver) Runner-up
2017	All England Open	(China) Liu Yuchen	(Indonesia) Marcus Fernaldi Gideon (Indonesia) Kevin Sanjaya Sukamuljo	19–21, 14–21	(silver) Runner-up
2017	Singapore Open	(China) Liu Yuchen	(Denmark) Mathias Boe (Denmark) Carsten Mogensen	13–21, 14–21	(silver) Runner-up
2017	Indonesia Open	(China) Liu Yuchen	(Denmark) Mathias Boe (Denmark) Carsten Mogensen	21–19, 19–21, 21–18	(gold) Winner

BWF Super Series Finals tournament
BWF Super Series Premier tournament
BWF Super Series tournament

=== BWF Grand Prix (6 titles, 2 runners-up) ===
The BWF Grand Prix had two levels, the Grand Prix and Grand Prix Gold. It was a series of badminton tournaments sanctioned by the Badminton World Federation (BWF) and played between 2007 and 2017.

Men's doubles
Year	Tournament	Partner	Opponent	Score	Result
2013	New Zealand Open	(China) Liu Yuchen	(Indonesia) Angga Pratama (Indonesia) Rian Agung Saputro	6–21, 20–22	(silver) Runner-up
2014	India Grand Prix Gold	(China) Liu Yuchen	(China) Huang Kaixiang (China) Zheng Siwei	21–17, 19–21, 22–20	(gold) Winner
2014	Chinese Taipei Open	(China) Liu Yuchen	(Indonesia) Andrei Adistia (Indonesia) Hendra Aprida Gunawan	14–21, 21–16, 16–21	(silver) Runner-up
2015	China Masters	(China) Liu Yuchen	(China) Wang Yilyu (China) Zhang Wen	21–15, 19–21, 21–12	(gold) Winner
2015	U.S. Open	(China) Liu Yuchen	(India) Manu Attri (India) B. Sumeeth Reddy	21–12, 21–16	(gold) Winner
2015	Canada Open	(China) Liu Yuchen	(China) Huang Kaixiang (China) Wang Sijie	17–21, 21–12, 21–18	(gold) Winner
2015	Vietnam Open	(China) Liu Yuchen	(China) Huang Kaixiang (China) Wang Sijie	21–8, 21–16	(gold) Winner
2016	Chinese Taipei Open	(China) Liu Yuchen	(Chinese Taipei) Chen Hung-ling (Chinese Taipei) Wang Chi-lin	21–17, 17–21, 24–22	(gold) Winner

BWF Grand Prix Gold tournament
BWF Grand Prix tournament

=== BWF International Challenge/Series (1 runner-up) ===
Men's doubles
Year	Tournament	Partner	Opponent	Score	Result
2015	China International	(China) Liu Yuchen	(China) Wang Yilyu (China) Zhang Wen	10–21, 20–22	(silver) Runner-up

BWF International Challenge tournament
BWF International Series tournament
