= 2012 Asian Junior Badminton Championships – Teams event =

Badminton championship in Gimcheon, South Korea

Teams event at the 2012 Asian Junior Badminton Championships
- Venue: Gimcheon Indoor Stadium
- Location: Gimcheon, South Korea
- Dates: 30 June – 3 July 2012

The team tournament at the 2012 Asian Junior Badminton Championships took place from 30 June to 3 July 2012 at Gimcheon Indoor Stadium in Gimcheon, South Korea. A total of 15 countries competed in this event. Mongolia withdrew from the tournament.

== Group stage ==
=== Group A ===
Pos	Team	Pld	W	L	MF	MA	MD	GF	GA	GD	PF	PA	PD	Pts	Qualification	Hong Kong	Malaysia	India
1	Hong Kong	2	2	0	7	3	+4	15	8	+7	433	396	+37	2	Advance to knockout stage	—	3–2	4–1
2	Malaysia	2	1	1	5	5	0	11	11	0	412	395	+17	1			—	3–2
3	India	2	0	2	3	7	−4	7	14	−7	343	397	−54	0				—

Source: BadmintonCN

==== Malaysia vs Hong Kong ====
Malaysia
2
Gimcheon Indoor Stadium, Court 6
30 June 2012, 09:00 UTC+8

Hong Kong
3

			1	2	3
1	(Malaysia) (Hong Kong)	Tan Wee Gieen / Chow Mei Kuan; Lee Chun Hei / Yuen Sin Ying	16; 21	20; 22
2	(Malaysia) (Hong Kong)	Soong Joo Ven; Ng Ka Long	18; 21	21; 16	21; 16
3	(Malaysia) (Hong Kong)	Lim Yin Fun; Ng Wing Yung	17; 21	14; 21
4	(Malaysia) (Hong Kong)	Darren Isaac Devadass / Tai An Khang; Lee Chun Hei / Ng Ka Long	15; 21	21; 18	16; 21
5	(Malaysia) (Hong Kong)	Chow Mei Kuan / Lee Meng Yean; Cheung Ying Mei / Yuen Sin Ying	21; 18	21; 11

==== India vs Hong Kong ====
India
1
Gimcheon Indoor Stadium, Court 2
30 June 2012, 16:00 UTC+8

Hong Kong
4

			1	2	3
1	(India) (Hong Kong)	B. Venkatesh / Meghana Jakkampudi; Lee Chun Hei / Yuen Sin Ying	11; 21	15; 21
2	(India) (Hong Kong)	Sameer Verma; Ng Ka Long Angus	12; 21	12; 21
3	(India) (Hong Kong)	P. V. Sindhu; Ng Wing Yung	21; 14	21; 5
4	(India) (Hong Kong)	Gopi Raju / Hema Nagendra Babu Thandarang; Lee Chun Hei / Ng Ka Long	13; 21	17; 21
5	(India) (Hong Kong)	K. Maneesha / P. V. Sindhu; Cheung Ying Mei / Yuen Sin Ying	18; 21	21; 19	14; 21

==== Malaysia vs India ====
Malaysia
3
Gimcheon Indoor Stadium, Court 3
1 July 2012, 09:00 UTC+8

India
2

			1	2	3
1	(Malaysia) (India)	Tan Wee Gieen / Chow Mei Kuan; Hema Nagendra Babu Thandarang / K. Maneesha	21; 16	21; 15
2	(Malaysia) (India)	Soong Joo Ven; Sameer Verma	21; 17	20; 22	21; 10
3	(Malaysia) (India)	Lim Yin Fun; P. V. Sindhu	15; 21	14; 21
4	(Malaysia) (India)	Darren Isaac Devadass / Tai An Khang; Gopi Raju / Hema Nagendra Babu Thandarang	21; 13	21; 12
5	(Malaysia) (India)	Chow Mei Kuan / Lee Meng Yean; K. Maneesha / P. V. Sindhu	16; 21			retired

=== Group B ===
Pos	Team	Pld	W	L	MF	MA	MD	GF	GA	GD	PF	PA	PD	Pts	Qualification	Indonesia	Chinese Taipei for Olympic games	Singapore	Mongolia
1	Indonesia	2	2	0	9	1	+8	18	3	+15	432	314	+118	2	Advance to knockout stage	—	4–1	5–0	w.o.
2	Chinese Taipei	2	1	1	6	4	+2	13	10	+3	426	417	+9	1	Advance to knockout stage		—	5–0	w.o.
3	Singapore	2	0	2	0	10	−10	2	20	−18	334	461	−127	0				—	w.o.
4	Mongolia	0	0	0	0	0	0	0	0	0	0	0	0	0	Withdrew				—

Source: BadmintonCN

==== Chinese Taipei vs Mongolia ====
Chinese Taipei
-
Gimcheon Indoor Stadium, Court 2
30 June 2012, 09:00 UTC+8

Mongolia
Withdrew

		1	2	3
1	(Chinese Taipei) (Mongolia)
2	(Chinese Taipei) (Mongolia)
3	(Chinese Taipei) (Mongolia)
4	(Chinese Taipei) (Mongolia)
5	(Chinese Taipei) (Mongolia)

==== Indonesia vs Singapore ====
Indonesia
5
Gimcheon Indoor Stadium, Court 5
30 June 2012, 09:00 UTC+8

Singapore
0

			1	2	3
1	(Indonesia) (Singapore)	Putra Eka Rhoma / Hafiz Faizal; Leslie Teng / Ming Shun Tan	21; 19	21; 9
2	(Indonesia) (Singapore)	Hanna Ramadini; Liang Xiaoyu	22; 20	21; 18
3	(Indonesia) (Singapore)	Shesar Hiren Rhustavito; Bernard Ong	21; 12	21; 14
4	(Indonesia) (Singapore)	Shela Devi Aulia / Anggia Shitta Awanda; Gao Yuemian / Joline Chua	21; 10	21; 12
5	(Indonesia) (Singapore)	Edi Subaktiar / Melati Daeva Oktavianti; Muhammad Asraf Ishak / Elaine Chua	21; 12	21; 12

==== Chinese Taipei vs Singapore ====
Chinese Taipei
5
Gimcheon Indoor Stadium, Court 1
30 June 2012, 16:00 UTC+8

Singapore
0

			1	2	3
1	(Chinese Taipei) (Singapore)	Wang Chi-lin / Chen Szu-yu; Muhammad Asraf Ishak / Elaine Chua	21; 18	21; 12
2	(Chinese Taipei) (Singapore)	Wang Tzu-wei; Bernard Ong	21; 12	19; 21	21; 15
3	(Chinese Taipei) (Singapore)	Wang Chi-lin / Wu Hsiao-lin; Muhammad Asraf Ishak / Leslie Teng	21; 14	21; 13
4	(Chinese Taipei) (Singapore)	Lin Ying-chun; Liang Xiaoyu	19; 21	23; 21	21; 18
5	(Chinese Taipei) (Singapore)	Chen Szu-yu / Chen Ting-yi; Elaine Chua / Joline Chua	21; 15	21; 16

==== Indonesia vs Mongolia ====
Indonesia
-
Gimcheon Indoor Stadium, Court 5
30 June 2012, 16:00 UTC+8

Mongolia
Withdrew

		1	2	3
1	(Indonesia) (Mongolia)
2	(Indonesia) (Mongolia)
3	(Indonesia) (Mongolia)
4	(Indonesia) (Mongolia)
5	(Indonesia) (Mongolia)

==== Chinese Taipei vs Indonesia ====
Chinese Taipei
1
Gimcheon Indoor Stadium, Court 1
1 July 2012, 09:00 UTC+8

Indonesia
4

			1	2	3
1	(Chinese Taipei) (Indonesia)	Wang Chi-lin / Chen Szu-yu; Alfian Eko Prasetya / Shela Devi Aulia	21; 16	11; 21	15; 21
2	(Chinese Taipei) (Indonesia)	Wang Tzu-wei; Arif Ramadhan	21; 19	21; 17
3	(Chinese Taipei) (Indonesia)	Wang Chi-lin / Wu Hsiao-lin; Arya Maulana Adiartama / Edi Subaktiar	20; 22	12; 21
4	(Chinese Taipei) (Indonesia)	Lin Ying-chun; Setyana Mapasa	16; 21	10; 21
5	(Chinese Taipei) (Indonesia)	Chen Szu-yu / Chen Ting-yi; Melati Daeva Oktavianti / Rosyita Eka Putri Sari	10; 21	19; 21

==== Singapore vs Mongolia ====
Singapore
-
Gimcheon Indoor Stadium, Court 6
1 July 2012, 09:00 UTC+8

Mongolia
Withdrew

		1	2	3
1	(Singapore) (Mongolia)
2	(Singapore) (Mongolia)
3	(Singapore) (Mongolia)
4	(Singapore) (Mongolia)
5	(Singapore) (Mongolia)

=== Group C ===
Pos	Team	Pld	W	L	MF	MA	MD	GF	GA	GD	PF	PA	PD	Pts	Qualification	Thailand	South Korea	Sri Lanka	Uzbekistan
1	Thailand	3	3	0	13	2	+11	26	4	+22	590	367	+223	3	Advance to knockout stage	—	3–2	5–0	5–0
2	South Korea (H)	3	2	1	12	3	+9	24	6	+18	611	289	+322	2	Advance to knockout stage		—	5–0	5–0
3	Sri Lanka	3	1	2	5	10	−5	10	21	−11	414	539	−125	1				—	5–0
4	Uzbekistan	3	0	3	0	15	−15	1	30	−29	229	649	−420	0					—

Source: BadmintonCN
(H) Host

==== Thailand vs Sri Lanka ====
Thailand
5
Gimcheon Indoor Stadium, Court 1
30 June 2012, 09:00 UTC+8

Sri Lanka
0

			1	2	3
1	(Thailand) (Sri Lanka)	Puthaporn Bvornwatanuwong / Natpapon Kitphaibool; Madusha de Silva / Kamod Rashmitha Halambage	21; 14	21; 13
2	(Thailand) (Sri Lanka)	Busanan Ongbamrungphan; Oshadie Kuruppu	21; 12	21; 4
3	(Thailand) (Sri Lanka)	Khosit Phetpradab; Yatawara Damitha Bandara	21; 14	21; 11
4	(Thailand) (Sri Lanka)	Wiranpatch Hongchookeat / Puttita Supajirakul; Thilini Hendahewa / Sushmitha Illangakoon	21; 15	21; 11
5	(Thailand) (Sri Lanka)	Sitthikom Thammasin / Narissapat Lam; Maneeshi Fonseka / Kamod Rashmitha Halambage	21; 12	21; 7

==== South Korea vs Uzbekistan ====
South Korea
5
Gimcheon Indoor Stadium, Court 3
30 June 2012, 09:00 UTC+8

Uzbekistan
0

			1	2	3
1	(South Korea) (Uzbekistan)	Choi Sol-gyu / Chae Yu-jung; Bekzod Appakhodjaev / Anait Khurshudyan	21; 2	21; 3
2	(South Korea) (Uzbekistan)	Jung Jae-wook; Artyom Savatyugin	21; 9	21; 5
3	(South Korea) (Uzbekistan)	Lee Jang-mi; Valeriya Mushtakova	21; 6	21; 7
4	(South Korea) (Uzbekistan)	Bae Kwon-young / Jun Bong-chan; Bekzod Appakhodjaev / Artyom Savatyugin	21; 3	21; 7
5	(South Korea) (Uzbekistan)	Lee So-hee / Shin Seung-chan; Anait Khurshudyan / Valeriya Mushtakova	21; 2	21; 3

==== Thailand vs Uzbekistan ====
Thailand
5
Gimcheon Indoor Stadium, Court 4
30 June 2012, 16:00 UTC+8

Uzbekistan
0

			1	2	3
1	(Thailand) (Uzbekistan)	Natpapon Kitphaibool / Wiranpatch Hongchookeat; Sergey Chugunov / Valeriya Mushtakova	21; 6	21; 6
2	(Thailand) (Uzbekistan)	Sitthikom Thammasin; Artyom Savatyugin	21; 7	21; 6
3	(Thailand) (Uzbekistan)	Sarita Suwannakitborihan; Anait Khurshudyan	21; 3	21; 8
4	(Thailand) (Uzbekistan)	Saksarun Ampanporn / Thawornwong Tossapol; Sergey Chugunov / Artyom Savatyugin	21; 11	21; 7
5	(Thailand) (Uzbekistan)	Narissapat Lam / Maetenee Phattanaphitoon; Anait Khurshudyan / Valeriya Mushtakova	21; 4	21; 5

==== South Korea vs Sri Lanka ====
South Korea
5
Gimcheon Indoor Stadium, Court 6
30 June 2012, 16:00 UTC+8

Sri Lanka
0

			1	2	3
1	(South Korea) (Sri Lanka)	Heo Kwang-hee; Madusha Vibhavi	21; 8	21; 14
2	(South Korea) (Sri Lanka)	Kim Hyo-min; Sushmitha Illangakoon	21; 11	21; 8
3	(South Korea) (Sri Lanka)	Choi Sol-gyu / Park Se-woong; Yatawara Damitha Bandara / Madusha Vibhavi	21; 0	21; 7
4	(South Korea) (Sri Lanka)	Chae Yu-jung / Kim Ji-won; Sithara Janithanjali / Sachini Samarasinghe	21; 3	21; 7
5	(South Korea) (Sri Lanka)	Bae Kwon-young / Shin Seung-chan; Madusha de Silva / Kavidi Sirimannage	21; 6	21; 8

==== South Korea vs Thailand ====
South Korea
2
Gimcheon Indoor Stadium, Court 4
1 July 2012, 09:00 UTC+8

Thailand
3

			1	2	3
1	(South Korea) (Thailand)	Bae Kwon-young / Shin Seung-chan; Sitthikom Thammasin / Narissapat Lam	19; 21	14; 21
2	(South Korea) (Thailand)	Jung Jae-wook; Khosit Phetpradab	20; 22	20; 22
3	(South Korea) (Thailand)	Choi Sol-gyu / Park Se-woong; Saksarun Ampanporn / Thawornwong Tossapol	21; 8	21; 10
4	(South Korea) (Thailand)	Kim Hyo-min; Busanan Ongbamrungphan	17; 21	17; 21
5	(South Korea) (Thailand)	Lee So-hee / Shin Seung-chan; Narissapat Lam / Maetenee Phattanaphitoon	21; 6	21; 18

==== Sri Lanka vs Uzbekistan ====
Sri Lanka
5
Gimcheon Indoor Stadium, Court 5
1 July 2012, 09:00 UTC+8

Uzbekistan
0

			1	2	3
1	(Sri Lanka) (Uzbekistan)	Yatawara Damitha Bandara / Sushmitha Illangakoon; Bekzod Appakhodjaev / Anait Khurshudyan	21; 5	21; 9
2	(Sri Lanka) (Uzbekistan)	Pamodha Hettiarachchi; Artyom Savatyugin	19; 21	21; 17	21; 8
3	(Sri Lanka) (Uzbekistan)	Sushmitha Illangakoon; Valeriya Mushtakova	21; 7	21; 9
4	(Sri Lanka) (Uzbekistan)	Pamuditha Lahiru Ambegoda / Pamodha Hettiarachchi; Bekzod Appakhodjaev / Artyom Savatyugin	21; 15	21; 10
5	(Sri Lanka) (Uzbekistan)	Oshadie Kuruppu / Kavidi Sirimannage; Anait Khurshudyan / Valeriya Mushtakova	21; 7	21; 11

=== Group D ===
Pos	Team	Pld	W	L	MF	MA	MD	GF	GA	GD	PF	PA	PD	Pts	Qualification	People's Republic of China	Japan	Vietnam
1	China	2	2	0	9	1	+8	19	3	+16	440	288	+152	2	Advance to knockout stage	—	4–1	5–0
2	Japan	2	1	1	6	4	+2	13	9	+4	392	366	+26	1	Advance to knockout stage		—	5–0
3	Vietnam	2	0	2	0	10	−10	0	20	−20	246	424	−178	0				—

Source: BadmintonCN

==== China vs Vietnam ====
China
5
Gimcheon Indoor Stadium, Court 4
30 June 2012, 09:00 UTC+8

Vietnam
0

			1	2	3
1	(China) (Vietnam)	Liu Yuchen / Shi Longfei; Đỗ Tuấn Đức / Phạm Hồng Nam	21; 16	21; 5
2	(China) (Vietnam)	Fan Mengyan; Lê Thu Huyền	21; 8	21; 11
3	(China) (Vietnam)	Guo Kai; Phạm Cao Cường	23; 21	21; 10
4	(China) (Vietnam)	Huang Dongping / Xiong Mengjing; Lê Thu Huyền / Phạm Như Thảo	21; 12	21; 10
5	(China) (Vietnam)	Zhang Ningyi / Huang Yaqiong; Ngô Xuân Tú / Đinh Thị Phương Hồng	21; 6	21; 9

==== Japan vs Vietnam ====
Japan
5
Gimcheon Indoor Stadium, Court 3
30 June 2012, 16:00 UTC+8

Vietnam
0

			1	2	3
1	(Japan) (Vietnam)	Akira Koga / Akane Yamaguchi; Phạm Hồng Nam / Phạm Như Thảo	21; 18	23; 21
2	(Japan) (Vietnam)	Kento Momota; Phạm Cao Cường	21; 13	21; 13
3	(Japan) (Vietnam)	Keiichiro Matsui / Koshun Miura; Đỗ Tuấn Đức / Phạm Hồng Nam	21; 6	21; 10
4	(Japan) (Vietnam)	Nozomi Okuhara; Đinh Thị Phương Hồng	21; 8	21; 14
5	(Japan) (Vietnam)	Saki Hayata / Akane Watanabe; Lê Thu Huyền / Phạm Như Thảo	21; 16	21; 19

==== China vs Japan ====
China
4
Gimcheon Indoor Stadium, Court 2
1 July 2025, 09:00 UTC+8

Japan
1

			1	2	3
1	(China) (Japan)	Pei Tianyi / Wang Yilyu; Keiichiro Matsui / Koshun Miura	19; 21	21; 17	21; 12
2	(China) (Japan)	Chen Shuyuan; Aya Ohori	10; 21	21; 14	10; 21
3	(China) (Japan)	Xue Song; Kenta Nishimoto	21; 7	21; 17
4	(China) (Japan)	Huang Yaqiong / Yu Xiaohan; Saki Hayata / Akane Watanabe	21; 12	21; 13
5	(China) (Japan)	Zhang Ningyi / Huang Dongping; Akira Koga / Akane Yamaguchi	21; 11	21; 14

== Knockout stage ==
=== Bracket ===
Quarter-finals
1 July
Hong Kong	2
South Korea	3
1 July
Indonesia	0
Japan	3
1 July
Malaysia	3
Thailand	1
1 July
Chinese Taipei	0
China	3

Semi-finals
2 July
China	1
Japan	3
2 July
Malaysia	1
China	3

Final
3 July
Japan	3
China	0

=== Quarter-finals ===
==== Hong Kong vs South Korea ====
Hong Kong
2
Gimcheon Indoor Stadium, Court 1
1 July 2012, 16:00 UTC+8

South Korea
3

			1	2	3
1	(Hong Kong) (South Korea)	Lee Chun Hei / Yuen Sin Ying; Choi Sol-gyu / Chae Yu-jung	14; 21	21; 15	18; 21
2	(Hong Kong) (South Korea)	Ng Ka Long; Jung Jae-wook	21; 14	21; 18
3	(Hong Kong) (South Korea)	Tsang Wing Chiu; Kim Hyo-min	11; 21	11; 21
4	(Hong Kong) (South Korea)	Lee Chun Hei / Ng Ka Long; Choi Sol-gyu / Park Se-woong	21; 18	22; 20
5	(Hong Kong) (South Korea)	Cheung Ying Mei / Yuen Sin Ying; Lee So-hee / Shin Seung-chan	9; 21	3; 21

==== Indonesia vs Japan ====
Indonesia
0
Gimcheon Indoor Stadium, Court 3
1 July 2012, 16:00 UTC+8

Japan
3

			1	2	3
1	(Indonesia) (Japan)	Arya Maulana Aldiartama / Edi Subaktiar; Takuto Inoue / Yuki Kaneko	9; 21	10; 21
2	(Indonesia) (Japan)	Hanna Ramadini; Nozomi Okuhara	9; 21	15; 21
3	(Indonesia) (Japan)	Shesar Hiren Rhustavito; Kento Momota	19; 21	15; 21
4	(Indonesia) (Japan)	Shela Devi Aulia / Anggia Shitta Awanda; Chisato Hoshi / Ayako Sakuramoto				not played
5	(Indonesia) (Japan)	Alfian Eko Prasetya / Melati Daeva Oktavianti; Akira Koga / Akane Watanabe				not played

==== Malaysia vs Thailand ====
Malaysia
3
Gimcheon Indoor Stadium, Court 4
1 July 2012, 16:00 UTC+8

Thailand
1

			1	2	3
1	(Malaysia) (Thailand)	Tan Wee Gieen / Chow Mei Kuan; Sitthikom Thammasin / Narissapat Lam	19; 21	21; 15	21; 14
2	(Malaysia) (Thailand)	Soong Joo Ven; Khosit Phetpradab	21; 14	21; 11
3	(Malaysia) (Thailand)	Lim Chiew Sien; Busanan Ongbamrungphan	13; 21	13; 21
4	(Malaysia) (Thailand)	Calvin Ong Jia Hong / Tan Wee Gieen; Natpapon Kitphaibool / Puthaporn Bvornwatanuwong	20; 22	21; 17	21; 13
5	(Malaysia) (Thailand)	Chow Mei Kuan / Lee Meng Yean; Narissapat Lam / Maetenee Phattanaphitoon				not played

==== Chinese Taipei vs China ====
Chinese Taipei
0
Gimcheon Indoor Stadium, Court 6
1 July 2012, 16:00 UTC+8

China
3

			1	2	3
1	(Chinese Taipei) (China)	Wu Hsiao-lin / Chen Ting-yi; Zhang Ningyi / Huang Dongping	12; 21	10; 21
2	(Chinese Taipei) (China)	Wang Tzu-wei; Xue Song	15; 21	19; 21
3	(Chinese Taipei) (China)	Wang Chi-lin / Wu Hsiao-lin; Pei Tianyi / Wang Yilyu	21; 23	21; 14	17; 21
4	(Chinese Taipei) (China)	Yu Chien-hui; Sun Yu				not played
5	(Chinese Taipei) (China)	Chen Ting-yi / Chen Szu-yu; Huang Yaqiong / Yu Xiaohan				not played

=== Semi-finals ===
==== South Korea vs Japan ====
South Korea
1
Gimcheon Indoor Stadium, Court 2
2 July 2012, 14:00 UTC+8

Japan
3

			1	2	3
1	(South Korea) (Japan)	Choi Sol-gyu / Shin Seung-chan; Akira Koga / Akane Watanabe	21; 8	16; 21	21; 10
2	(South Korea) (Japan)	Jeon Hyeok-jin; Kento Momota	17; 21	13; 21
3	(South Korea) (Japan)	Choi Sol-gyu / Park Se-woong; Takuto Inoue / Yuki Kaneko	18; 21	13; 21
4	(South Korea) (Japan)	Kim Hyo-min; Nozomi Okuhara	13; 21	15; 21
5	(South Korea) (Japan)	Lee So-hee / Shin Seung-chan; Chisato Hoshi / Ayako Sakuramoto				not played

==== Malaysia vs China ====
Malaysia
1
Gimcheon Indoor Stadium, Court 5
2 July 2012, 14:00 UTC+8

China
3

			1	2	3
1	(Malaysia) (China)	Tan Wee Gieen / Chow Mei Kuan; Zhang Ningyi / Huang Yaqiong	13; 21	21; 19	20; 22
2	(Malaysia) (China)	Tan Kian Meng; Xue Song	18; 21	14; 21
3	(Malaysia) (China)	Darren Isaac Devadass / Tai An Khang; Pei Tianyi / Wang Yilyu	8; 21	21; 17	21; 15
4	(Malaysia) (China)	Lim Yin Fun; Sun Yu	12; 21	13; 21
5	(Malaysia) (China)	Chow Mei Kuan / Lee Meng Yean; Yu Xiaohan / Huang Yaqiong				not played

=== Final ===
==== Japan vs China ====
Japan
3
Gimcheon Indoor Stadium, Court 2
3 July 2012, 09:00 UTC+8

China
0

			1	2	3
1	(Japan) (China)	Akira Koga / Akane Yamaguchi; Pei Tianyi / Huang Yaqiong	21; 16	16; 21	21; 19
2	(Japan) (China)	Kento Momota; Xue Song	17; 21	23; 21	21; 14
3	(Japan) (China)	Takuto Inoue / Yuki Kaneko; Pei Tianyi / Zhang Ningyi	21; 18	21; 15
4	(Japan) (China)	Nozomi Okuhara; Sun Yu				not played
5	(Japan) (China)	Chisato Hoshi / Ayako Sakuramoto; Huang Yaqiong / Yu Xiaohan				not played
