= 2012 BWF World Junior Championships – Teams event =

2012 BWF World Junior Championships - Team event
Tournament details
- Dates: 25–28 October
- Edition: 14th
- Level: International
- Nations: 30
- Venue: Port Arena Stadium
- Location: Chiba, Japan

The Team event tournament of the 2012 BWF World Junior Championships was the fourteenth tournament of the BWF World Junior Championships. It was held from October 25–28, 2012 in Chiba, Japan. According to the Badminton World Federation (BWF) 30 teams have confirmed their participation. The winner of the tournament would have Suhandinata Cup for about a year until the next BWF World Junior Championships Team Event is held.

== Seedings ==
The seedings for teams competing in the tournament were released on October 11, 2012. It was based on aggregated points from the best players in the world junior ranking and the result of last year tournament. The tournament was divided into four groups, with Japan and China were the two top seeds, and 2 teams (Malaysia and Korea) in the seeded 3-4 were also put into the same group. another 4 teams were put in the second groups. Eight teams (seeded 9-16) were seeded into third groups and the last sixteen teams were seeded into last groups. The draw was held on the same day in Kuala Lumpur.

=== Group 1 (Seeded 1-4) ===
1. Japan
2. China
3. Malaysia
4. South Korea

=== Group 2 (Seeded 5-8) ===
5. Indonesia
6. Chinese Taipei
7. Thailand
8. Hong Kong

=== Group 3 (Seeded 9-16) ===
9. India
10. England
11. Germany
12. France
13. Netherlands
14. Singapore
15. Turkey
16. Russia

=== Group 4 (Seeded 17-30) ===
17. Canada
18. United States
19. South Africa
20. Sri Lanka
21. Finland
22. Ukraine
23. Australia
24. Czech Republic
25. Vietnam
26. Philippines
27. Bulgaria
28. Belgium (Debut)
29. Ireland (Debut)
30. Uzbekistan (Debut)

== Group stage ==
Qualified for quarterfinals

=== Group W1 ===
Team	Pts	Pld	W	L	MF	MA
Japan	2	2	2	0	10	0
Philippines	1	2	1	1	3	7
Turkey	0	2	0	2	2	8

October 25, 2012
Japan	5-0	Philippines
October 25, 2012
Turkey	2-3	Philippines
October 26, 2012
Japan	5-0	Turkey

=== Group W2 ===
Team	Pts	Pld	W	L	MF	MA
Thailand	3	3	3	0	15	0
India	2	3	2	1	8	7
Finland	1	3	1	2	3	12
Bulgaria	0	3	0	3	4	11

October 25, 2012
Thailand	5-0	Bulgaria
October 25, 2012
India	5-0	Finland
October 25, 2012
Thailand	5-0	Finland
October 25, 2012
India	3-2	Bulgaria
October 26, 2012
Thailand	5-0	India
October 26, 2012
Finland	3-2	Bulgaria

=== Group X1 ===
Team	Pts	Pld	W	L	MF	MA
South Korea	3	3	3	0	15	0
Singapore	2	3	2	1	10	5
Belgium	1	3	1	2	5	10
Uzbekistan	0	3	0	3	0	15

October 25, 2012
South Korea	5-0	Uzbekistan
October 25, 2012
Singapore	5-0	Belgium
October 25, 2012
South Korea	5-0	Belgium
October 25, 2012
Singapore	5-0	Uzbekistan
October 26, 2012
South Korea	5-0	Singapore
October 24, 2013
Belgium	5-0	Uzbekistan

=== Group X2 ===
Team	Pts	Pld	W	L	MF	MA
Chinese Taipei	3	3	3	0	14	1
Russia	2	3	2	1	10	5
Australia	1	3	1	2	3	12
Czech Republic	0	3	0	3	3	12

October 25, 2012
Chinese Taipei	5-0	Czech Republic
October 25, 2012
Russia	5-0	Australia
October 25, 2012
Chinese Taipei	5-0	Australia
October 25, 2012
Russia	4-1	Czech Republic
October 26, 2012
Chinese Taipei	4-1	Russia
October 26, 2012
Australia	3-2	Czech Republic

=== Group Y1 ===
Team	Pts	Pld	W	L	MF	MA
Malaysia	3	3	3	0	12	3
Vietnam	2	3	2	1	9	6
France	1	3	1	2	8	7
Ukraine	0	3	0	3	1	14

October 25, 2012
Malaysia	5-0	Ukraine
October 25, 2012
France	2-3	Vietnam
October 26, 2012
Malaysia	4-1	Vietnam
October 26, 2012
France	4-1	Ukraine
October 26, 2012
Malaysia	3-2	France
October 26, 2012
Vietnam	5-0	Ukraine

=== Group Y2 ===
Team	Pts	Pld	W	L	MF	MA
Indonesia	3	3	3	0	15	0
Netherlands	2	3	2	1	6	9
Canada	1	3	1	2	6	9
Ireland	0	3	0	3	3	12

October 25, 2012
Indonesia	5-0	Canada
October 25, 2012
Netherlands	3-2	Ireland
October 26, 2012
Indonesia	5-0	Ireland
October 26, 2012
Netherlands	3-2	Canada
October 26, 2012
Indonesia	5-0	Netherlands
October 26, 2012
Ireland	1-4	Canada

=== Group Z1 ===
Team	Pts	Pld	W	L	MF	MA
China	2	2	2	0	10	0
England	1	2	1	1	4	6
Sri Lanka	0	2	0	2	1	9

October 25, 2012
China	5-0	Sri Lanka
October 26, 2012
England	4-1	Sri Lanka
October 26, 2012
China	5-0	England

=== Group Z2 ===
Team	Pts	Pld	W	L	MF	MA
Hong Kong	3	3	3	0	12	3
Germany	2	3	2	1	10	5
United States	1	3	1	2	7	8
South Africa	0	3	0	3	1	14

October 25, 2012
Hong Kong	4-1	United States
October 25, 2012
Germany	5-0	South Africa
October 26, 2012
Hong Kong	5-0	South Africa
October 26, 2012
Germany	3-2	United States
October 26, 2012
Hong Kong	3-2	Germany
October 26, 2012
South Africa	1-4	United States

== Knockout stage ==
Quarterfinals
W1	Japan	3
W2	Thailand	0
X1	South Korea	3
X2	Chinese Taipei	0
Y1	Malaysia	1
Y2	Indonesia	3
Z1	China	3
Z2	Hong Kong	0

Semifinals
W1	Japan	3
X1	South Korea	0
Y2	Indonesia	1
Z1	China	3

Final
W1	Japan	2
Z1	China	3
Third place
X1	South Korea	3
Y2	Indonesia	0

=== Quarter-finals ===
==== Japan vs Thailand ====
Japan
3
Port Arena Stadium Court 1
27 October 2012

Thailand
0

			1	2	3
1	(Japan) (Thailand)	Akira Koga / Akane Yamaguchi; Dechapol Puavaranukroh / Puttita Supajirakul	21; 18	21; 14
2	(Japan) (Thailand)	Kento Momota; Thammasin Sitthikom	21; 16	21; 14
3	(Japan) (Thailand)	Takuto Inoue / Yuki Kaneko; Kittinupong Ketlen / Dechapol Puavaranukroh	21; 11	21; 11
4	(Japan) (Thailand)	Nozomi Okuhara; Busanan Ongbumrungpan				not played
5	(Japan) (Thailand)	Chisato Hoshi / Ayako Sakuramoto; Lam Narissapat / Puttita Supajirakul				not played

==== South Korea vs Chinese Taipei ====
South Korea
3
Port Arena Stadium Court 3
27 October 2012

Chinese Taipei
0

			1	2	3
1	(South Korea) (Chinese Taipei)	Choi Sol-kyu / Chae Yoo-jung; Wang Chi-lin / Chen Szu-yu	21; 14	21; 16
2	(South Korea) (Chinese Taipei)	Jeon Hyuk-jin; Wang Tzu-wei	21; 14	21; 15
3	(South Korea) (Chinese Taipei)	Choi Sol-kyu / Park Se-woong; Wang Chi-lin / Wu Hsiao-lin	17; 21	21; 13	21; 14
4	(South Korea) (Chinese Taipei)	Kim Hyo-min; Tai Tzu-ying				not played
5	(South Korea) (Chinese Taipei)	Lee So-hee / Shin Seung-chan; Chen Szu-yu / Chen Ting-yi				not played

==== Malaysia vs Indonesia ====
Malaysia
1
Port Arena Stadium Court 5
27 October 2012

Indonesia
3

			1	2	3
1	(Malaysia) (Indonesia)	Tan Wee Gieen / Chow Mei Kuan; Alfian Eko Prasetya / Shella Devi Aulia	21; 15	20; 22	17; 21
2	(Malaysia) (Indonesia)	Soong Joo Ven; Arif Gifar Ramadhan	21; 17	21; 19
3	(Malaysia) (Indonesia)	Darren Isaac Devadass / Ong Yew Sin; Arya Maulana Aldiartama / Edi Subaktiar	18; 21	21; 18	18; 21
4	(Malaysia) (Indonesia)	Lim Yin Fun; Hanna Ramadhini	21; 17	10; 21	15; 21
5	(Malaysia) (Indonesia)	Chow Mei Kuan / Lee Meng Yean; Anggia Shitta Awanda / Melati Daeva Oktaviani				not played

==== China vs Hong Kong ====
China
3
Port Arena Stadium Court 7
27 October 2012

Hong Kong
0

			1	2	3
1	(China) (Hong Kong)	Wang Yilu / Chen Qingchen; Lee Chun Hei / Yuen Sin Ying	21; 18	21; 16
2	(China) (Hong Kong)	Guo Kai; Ng Ka Long	21; 18	16; 21	21; 17
3	(China) (Hong Kong)	Sun Yu; Ng Wing Yung	21; 7	21; 5
4	(China) (Hong Kong)	Liu Yuchen / Zhang Ningyi; Lee Chun Hei / Ng Ka Long				not played
5	(China) (Hong Kong)	Huang Yaqiong / Yu Xiaohan; Cheung Ying Mei / Yuen Sin Ying				not played

=== Semi-final ===
==== Japan vs South Korea ====
Japan
3
Port Arena Stadium Court 7
27 October 2012

South Korea
0

			1	2	3
1	(Japan) (South Korea)	Takuto Inoue / Yuki Kaneko; Choi Sol-kyu / Park Se-woong	21; 15	15; 21	21; 13
2	(Japan) (South Korea)	Nozomi Okuhara; Kim Hyo-min	21; 8	21; 7
3	(Japan) (South Korea)	Kento Momota; Heo Kwang-hee	21; 16	21; 14
4	(Japan) (South Korea)	Chisato Hoshi / Ayako Sakuramoto; Lee So-hee / Shin Seung-chan				not played
5	(Japan) (South Korea)	Akira Koga / Akane Yamaguchi; Choi Sol-kyu / Chae Yoo-jung				not played

==== Indonesia vs China ====
Indonesia
1
Port Arena Stadium Court 8
27 October 2012

China
3

			1	2	3
1	(Indonesia) (China)	Alfian Eko Prasetya / Shella Devi Aulia; Wang Yilu / Chen Qingchen	18; 21	17; 21
2	(Indonesia) (China)	Arif Gifar Ramadhan; Xue Song	14; 21	8; 21
3	(Indonesia) (China)	Hafiz Faisal / Putra Eka Rhoma; Liu Yuchen / Zhang Ningyi	24; 22	23; 21
4	(Indonesia) (China)	Hanna Ramadhini; Sun Yu	10; 21	10; 21
5	(Indonesia) (China)	Shella Devi Aulia / Anggia Shitta Awanda; Chen Qingchen / Huang Dongping				not played

=== Bronze Medal Final ===
==== South Korea vs Indonesia ====
South Korea
3
Port Arena Stadium Court 6
28 October 2012

Indonesia
0

			1	2	3
1	(South Korea) (Indonesia)	Choi Sol-kyu / Park Se-woong; Arya Maulana Aldiartama / Edi Subaktiar	21; 14	21; 11
2	(South Korea) (Indonesia)	Lee Jang-mi; Hanna Ramadhini	16; 21	21; 17	21; 17
3	(South Korea) (Indonesia)	Jeon Hyuk-jin; Panji Akbar Sudrajat	21; 19	21; 8
4	(South Korea) (Indonesia)	Lee So-hee / Shin Seung-chan; Anggia Shitta Awanda / Melati Daeva Oktaviani				not played
5	(South Korea) (Indonesia)	Choi Sol-kyu / Chae Yoo-jung; Alfian Eko Prasetya / Shella Devi Aulia				not played

=== Final ===
==== Japan vs China ====
Japan
2
Port Arena Stadium Court 6
28 October 2012

China
3

			1	2	3
1	(Japan) (China)	Takuto Inoue / Yuki Kaneko; Liu Yuchen / Zhang Ningyi	21; 17	17; 21	23; 21
2	(Japan) (China)	Nozomi Okuhara; Sun Yu	17; 21	14; 21
3	(Japan) (China)	Kento Momota; Xue Song	19; 21	21; 19	21; 19
4	(Japan) (China)	Chisato Hoshi / Ayako Sakuramoto; Huang Yaqiong / Yu Xiaohan	6; 21	7; 21
5	(Japan) (China)	Akira Koga / Akane Yamaguchi; Wang Yilu / Chen Qingchen	15; 21	21; 19	22; 24

== Final team ranking ==
1. China [2]
2. Japan [1]
3. South Korea [3/4]
4. Indonesia [5/8]
5. Chinese Taipei [5/8]
6. Malaysia [3/4]
7. Thailand [5/8]
8. Hong Kong [5/8]
9. India [9/16]
10. Germany [9/16]
11. Singapore [9/16]
12. Netherlands [9/16]
13. Philippines
14. Vietnam
15. England [9/16]
16. Russia [9/16]
17. France [9/16]
18. Finland
19. Australia
20. United States
21. Canada
22. Belgium
23. Turkey [9/16]
24. Sri Lanka
25. Czech Republic
26. Ireland
27. Bulgaria
28. South Africa
29. Ukraine
30. Uzbekistan
