= 2017 Japan Super Series =

Tournament details
- Dates: 19 – 24 September 2017
- Level: Super Series
- Total prize money: US$325,000
- Venue: Tokyo Metropolitan Gymnasium
- Location: Tokyo, Japan

Champions
- Men's singles: (Denmark) Viktor Axelsen
- Women's singles: (Spain) Carolina Marín
- Men's doubles: (Indonesia) Marcus Fernaldi Gideon (Indonesia) Kevin Sanjaya Sukamuljo
- Women's doubles: (Japan) Misaki Matsutomo (Japan) Ayaka Takahashi
- Mixed doubles: (China) Wang Yilu (China) Huang Dongping

The 2017 Japan Super Series is the eighth Super Series badminton tournament of the 2017 BWF Super Series. The tournament took place at the Tokyo Metropolitan Gymnasium in Tokyo, Japan from September 19 – 24, 2017 and had a total purse of $325,000.

== Men's singles ==
=== Seeds ===
1. (South Korea) Son Wan-ho (semifinals)
2. (China) Shi Yuqi (semifinals)
3. (Denmark) Viktor Axelsen (champion)
4. (Chinese Taipei) Chou Tien-chen (quarterfinals)
5. (Malaysia) Lee Chong Wei (final)
6. (Hong Kong) Ng Ka Long (first round)
7. (China) Lin Dan (quarterfinals)
8. (India) Srikanth Kidambi (quarterfinals)

=== Top half ===
First round
1	(South Korea) Son W-h	21	21
Q2	(Japan) Y Igarashi	13	13
(Chinese Taipei) Wang T-w	21	20	21
(South Korea) Lee H-i	12	22	23
7	(China) Lin Dan	11	21	21
(India) S Verma	21	15	13
Q3	(South Korea) Lee D-k	21	21	21
(India) B. S Praneeth	23	17	14
3	(Denmark) V Axelsen	21	21
(Thailand) T Saensomboonsuk	8	13
Q1	(Japan) K Nishimoto	22	21
(Indonesia) J Christie	20	15
8	(India) S Kidambi	21	12	21
(China) Tian HW	15	21	11
(Hong Kong) Hu Y	21	10	21
(Indonesia) A S Ginting	16	21	13

Second round
1	(South Korea) Son W-h	21	21
(South Korea) Lee H-i	14	18
7	(China) Lin Dan	21	21
Q3	(South Korea) Lee D-k	12	17
3	(Denmark) V Axelsen	21	21
Q1	(Japan) K Nishimoto	17	18
8	(India) S Kidambi	21	21
(Hong Kong) Hu Y	12	11

Quarterfinals
1	(South Korea) Son W-h	21	21
7	(China) Lin Dan	15	15
3	(Denmark) V Axelsen	21	21
8	(India) S Kidambi	17	17

Semifinals
1	(South Korea) Son W-h	16	16
3	(Denmark) V Axelsen	21	21

=== Bottom half ===
First round
(Indonesia) T Sugiarto	21	21
(China) Qiao B	17	15
(Hong Kong) Wong W K	15	21	17
5	(Malaysia) Lee C W	21	16	21
(China) Huang YX	11	12
(Denmark) H-K Vittinghus	21	21
PFQ	(Japan) K Tsuneyama	14	11
4	(Chinese Taipei) Chou T-c	21	21
(India) H. S. Prannoy	21	21
(Denmark) A Antonsen	12	14
(Chinese Taipei) Hsu J-h	14	21	21
6	(Hong Kong) Ng K L	21	18	15
(India) S Verma	21	21
Q4	(Thailand) K Phetpradab	12	19
(France) B Leverdez	21	6	16
2	(China) Shi YQ	19	21	21

Second round
(Indonesia) T Sugiarto	20	17
5	(Malaysia) Lee C W	22	21
(Denmark) H-K Vittinghus	21	22	13
4	(Chinese Taipei) Chou T-c	19	24	21
(India) H. S. Prannoy	21	23
(Chinese Taipei) Hsu J-h	16	21
(India) S Verma	21	17	15
2	(China) Shi YQ	10	21	21

Quarterfinals
5	(Malaysia) Lee C W	21	15	21
4	(Chinese Taipei) Chou T-c	11	21	19
(India) H. S. Prannoy	15	14
2	(China) Shi YQ	21	21

Semifinals
5	(Malaysia) Lee C W	21	21
2	(China) Shi YQ	19	8

=== Finals ===
Semifinals
1	(South Korea) Son Wan-ho	16	16
3	(Denmark) Viktor Axelsen	21	21
5	(Malaysia) Lee Chong Wei	21	21
2	(China) Shi Yuqi	19	8

Final
3	(Denmark) Viktor Axelsen	21	19	21
5	(Malaysia) Lee Chong Wei	14	21	14

== Women's singles ==
=== Seeds ===
1. (Chinese Taipei) Tai Tzu-ying (first round)
2. (Japan) Akane Yamaguchi (quarterfinals)
3. (South Korea) Sung Ji-hyun (first round)
4. (India) P. V. Sindhu (second round)
5. (Spain) Carolina Marín (champion)
6. (China) He Bingjiao (final)
7. (Thailand) Ratchanok Intanon (second round)
8. (United States) Beiwen Zhang (quarterfinals)

=== Top half ===
First round
1	(Chinese Taipei) Tai T-y
Q4	(Japan) H Suzuki	w	/	o
(Japan) A Ohori	21	21
(Thailand) B Ongbamrungphan	12	11
7	(Thailand) R Intanon	22	21
(Indonesia) Fitriani	20	12
(Scotland) K Gilmour	19	13
(China) Chen YF	21	21
3	(South Korea) Sung J-h	21	14	18
(Japan) S Kawakami	19	21	21
PFQ	(Denmark) L Kjaersfeldt	12	12
(Japan) S Takahashi	21	21
6	(China) He BJ	21	21
(Japan) S Sato	9	10
Q3	(Canada) M Li	21	21
(Chinese Taipei) Chiang M-h	9	17

Second round
Q4	(Japan) H Suzuki	17	22
(Japan) A Ohori	21	24
7	(Thailand) R Intanon	15	17
(China) Chen YF	21	21
(Japan) S Kawakami	13	21	13
(Japan) S Takahashi	21	17	21
6	(China) He BJ	21	21
Q3	(Canada) M Li	13	12

Quarterfinals
(Japan) A Ohori	13	21	19
(China) Chen YF	21	10	21
(Japan) S Takahashi	21	20	16
6	(China) He BJ	14	22	21

Semifinals
(China) Chen YF	14	23
6	(China) He BJ	21	25

=== Bottom half ===
First round
(Chinese Taipei) Lee C-h	13	18
(Malaysia) Sonia Cheah S Y	21	21
(Thailand) N Jindapol	15	19
8	(United States) B Zhang	21	21
(Hong Kong) Cheung N Y	15	13
(Japan) N Okuhara	21	21
(Japan) M Mitani	21	15	17
4	(India) P. V. Sindhu	12	21	21
(Thailand) P Chochuwong	17	9
(India) S Nehwal	21	21
(China) Chen XX	11	11
5	(Spain) C Marín	21	21
Q1	(Denmark) M Blichfeldt	18	18
Q2	(South Korea) Kim H-m	21	21
(South Korea) Lee J-m	21	15	14
2	(Japan) A Yamaguchi	17	21	21

Second round
(Malaysia) Sonia Cheah S Y	14	14
8	(United States) B Zhang	21	21
(Japan) N Okuhara	21	21
4	(India) P. V. Sindhu	18	8
(India) S Nehwal	16	13
5	(Spain) C Marín	21	21
Q2	(South Korea) Kim H-m	12	21	8
2	(Japan) A Yamaguchi	21	18	21

Quarterfinals
8	(United States) B Zhang	16	21
(Japan) N Okuhara	21	23
5	(Spain) C Marín	21	21
2	(Japan) A Yamaguchi	18	15

Semifinals
(Japan) N Okuhara
5	(Spain) C Marín	w	/	o

=== Finals ===
Semifinals
(China) Chen Yufei	14	23
6	(China) He Bingjiao	21	25
(Japan) Nozomi Okuhara
5	(Spain) Carolina Marín	w	/	o

Final
6	(China) He Bingjiao	21	12
5	(Spain) Carolina Marín	23	21

== Men's doubles ==
=== Seeds ===
1. (China) Li Junhui / Liu Yuchen (withdrew)
2. (Denmark) Mathias Boe / Carsten Mogensen (semifinals)
3. (Indonesia) Marcus Fernaldi Gideon / Kevin Sanjaya Sukamuljo (champion)
4. (Japan) Takeshi Kamura / Keigo Sonoda (quarterfinals)
5. (Malaysia) Goh V Shem / Tan Wee Kiong (withdrew)
6. (Denmark) Mads Conrad-Petersen / Mads Pieler Kolding (quarterfinals)
7. (China) Liu Cheng / Zhang Nan (second round)
8. (Chinese Taipei) Lee Jhe-huei / Lee Yang (second round)

=== Top half ===
First round
PFQ	(Hong Kong) Or C C (Hong Kong) Tang C M	14	10
(Japan) T Inoue (Japan) Y Kaneko	21	21
(Indonesia) F Alfian (Indonesia) M R Ardianto	13	21	21
Q2	(Chinese Taipei) Lee S-m (Chinese Taipei) Lin C-y	21	12	17
8	(Chinese Taipei) Lee J-h (Chinese Taipei) Lee Y	21	21
PFQ	(India) M Attri (India) B. S Reddy	18	15
Q4	(Thailand) S Jomkoh (Thailand) P Kuna-Anuvit	17	21	15
(Malaysia) Ong Y S (Malaysia) Teo E Y	21	18	21
4	(Japan) T Kamura (Japan) K Sonoda	w	/	o
(Indonesia) R K Suwardi (Indonesia) A Pratama
(Malaysia) Lim K W (South Korea) Yoo Y-s	17	21	21
(Thailand) K Kedren (Thailand) D Puavaranukroh	21	13	16
7	(China) Liu C (China) Zhang N	15	24	21
(Indonesia) B Angriawan (Indonesia) Hardianto	21	22	13
(Hong Kong) Law C H (Hong Kong) Lee C H	23	13	13
(Russia) V Ivanov (Russia) I Sozonov	21	21	21

Second round
(Japan) T Inoue (Japan) Y Kaneko	21	21
(Indonesia) F Alfian (Indonesia) M R Ardianto	19	19
8	(Chinese Taipei) Lee J-h (Chinese Taipei) Lee Y	18	12
(Malaysia) Ong Y S (Malaysia) Teo E Y	21	21
4	(Japan) T Kamura (Japan) K Sonoda	21	21
(Malaysia) Lim K W (South Korea) Yoo Y-s	19	18
7	(China) Liu C (China) Zhang N	18	21	22
(Russia) V Ivanov (Russia) I Sozonov	21	15	24

Quarterfinals
(Japan) T Inoue (Japan) Y Kaneko	21	21
(Malaysia) Ong Y S (Malaysia) Teo E Y	15	18
4	(Japan) T Kamura (Japan) K Sonoda	26	20	19
(Russia) V Ivanov (Russia) I Sozonov	24	22	21

Semifinals
(Japan) T Inoue (Japan) Y Kaneko	12	21	21
(Russia) V Ivanov (Russia) I Sozonov	21	18	19

=== Bottom half ===
First round
(Germany) J R Jansen (Germany) J Zurwonne	12	15
(Thailand) B Isara (Thailand) N Phuangphuapet	21	21
(Denmark) K Astrup (Denmark) A S Rasmussen	21	24	21
PFQ	(Chinese Taipei) Liao M-c (Chinese Taipei) Su C-h	16	26	15
(China) Huang KX (China) Wang YL	19	19
(Japan) T Hoki (Japan) Y Kobayashi	21	21
Q3	(India) S Rankireddy (India) C Shetty	25	15
3	(Indonesia) M F Gideon (Indonesia) K S Sukamuljo	27	21
PFQ	(Germany) M Lamsfuss (Germany) M E Seidel	19	14
Q1	(South Korea) Kim W-h (South Korea) Seo S-j	21	21
(Chinese Taipei) Lu C-y (Chinese Taipei) Yang P-h	15	18
6	(Denmark) M Conrad-Petersen (Denmark) M P Kolding	21	21
(Chinese Taipei) Chen H-l (Chinese Taipei) Wang C-l	20	18
(Indonesia) H Setiawan (Malaysia) Tan B H	22	21
(England) M Ellis (England) C Langridge	15	11
2	(Denmark) M Boe (Denmark) C Mogensen	21	21

Second round
(Thailand) B Isara (Thailand) N Phuangphuapet	16	22^{r}
(Denmark) K Astrup (Denmark) A S Rasmussen	21	22
(Japan) T Hoki (Japan) Y Kobayashi	13	21	18
3	(Indonesia) M F Gideon (Indonesia) K S Sukamuljo	21	11	21
Q1	(South Korea) Kim W-h (South Korea) Seo S-j	13	12
6	(Denmark) M Conrad-Petersen (Denmark) M P Kolding	21	21
(Indonesia) H Setiawan (Malaysia) Tan B H	8	13
2	(Denmark) M Boe (Denmark) C Mogensen	21	21

Quarterfinals
(Denmark) K Astrup (Denmark) A S Rasmussen	19	20
3	(Indonesia) M F Gideon (Indonesia) K S Sukamuljo	21	22
6	(Denmark) M Conrad-Petersen (Denmark) M P Kolding	17	19
2	(Denmark) M Boe (Denmark) C Mogensen	21	21

Semifinals
3	(Indonesia) M F Gideon (Indonesia) K S Sukamuljo	21	21
2	(Denmark) M Boe (Denmark) C Mogensen	15	14

=== Finals ===
Semifinals
(Japan) Takuto Inoue (Japan) Yuki Kaneko	12	21	21
(Russia) Vladimir Ivanov (Russia) Ivan Sozonov	21	18	19
3	(Indonesia) Marcus Fernaldi Gideon (Indonesia) Kevin Sanjaya Sukamuljo	21	21
2	(Denmark) Mathias Boe (Denmark) Carsten Mogensen	15	14

Final
(Japan) Takuto Inoue (Japan) Yuki Kaneko	12	15
3	(Indonesia) Marcus Fernaldi Gideon (Indonesia) Kevin Sanjaya Sukamuljo	21	21

== Women's doubles ==
=== Seeds ===
1. (Japan) Misaki Matsutomo / Ayaka Takahashi (champion)
2. (Denmark) Kamilla Rytter Juhl / Christinna Pedersen (first round)
3. (South Korea) Chang Ye-na / Lee So-hee (quarterfinals)
4. (China) Chen Qingchen / Jia Yifan (first round)
5. (South Korea) Jung Kyung-eun / Shin Seung-chan (first round)
6. (China) Huang Dongping / Li Yinhui (withdrew)
7. (Japan) Shiho Tanaka / Koharu Yonemoto (quarterfinals)
8. (Japan) Yuki Fukushima / Sayaka Hirota (semifinals)

=== Top half ===
First round
1	(Japan) M Matsutomo (Japan) A Takahashi	21	21
(Hong Kong) Poon L Y (Hong Kong) Tse Y S	12	8
(Indonesia) G Polii (Indonesia) A Rahayu	21	17	21
(Thailand) C Chaladchalam (Thailand) P Muenwong	14	21	13
7	(Japan) S Tanaka (Japan) K Yonemoto	21	21
PFQ	(Chinese Taipei) Cheng Y-c (Chinese Taipei) Hu L-f	12	16
Q4	(Japan) N Matsuyama (Japan) C Shida	21	21
(Bulgaria) G Stoeva (Bulgaria) S Stoeva	9	12
3	(South Korea) Chang Y-n (South Korea) Lee S-h	21	21
(India) A Ponnappa (India) N. S Reddy	17	12
(Japan) M Matsumoto (Japan) W Nagahara	11	17
(Chinese Taipei) Chiang K-h (Chinese Taipei) Hung S-h	21	21
8	(Japan) Y Fukushima (Japan) S Hirota	21	21
(Malaysia) Chow M K (Malaysia) Lee M Y	9	12
(Denmark) M Fruergaard (Denmark) S Thygesen	22	16	10
(Thailand) J Kititharakul (Thailand) R Prajongjai	20	21	21

Second round
1	(Japan) M Matsutomo (Japan) A Takahashi	21	12	21
(Indonesia) G Polii (Indonesia) A Rahayu	15	21	15
7	(Japan) S Tanaka (Japan) K Yonemoto	21	19	21
Q4	(Japan) N Matsuyama (Japan) C Shida	14	21	9
3	(South Korea) Chang Y-n (South Korea) Lee S-h	21	21
(Chinese Taipei) Chiang K-h (Chinese Taipei) Hung S-h	11	12
8	(Japan) Y Fukushima (Japan) S Hirota	21	21
(Thailand) J Kititharakul (Thailand) R Prajongjai	12	13

Quarterfinals
1	(Japan) M Matsutomo (Japan) A Takahashi	21	14	21
7	(Japan) S Tanaka (Japan) K Yonemoto	12	21	13
3	(South Korea) Chang Y-n (South Korea) Lee S-h	21	20	18
8	(Japan) Y Fukushima (Japan) S Hirota	18	22	21

Semifinals
1	(Japan) M Matsutomo (Japan) A Takahashi	21	21
8	(Japan) Y Fukushima (Japan) S Hirota	11	15

=== Bottom half ===
First round
(South Korea) Kim H-r (South Korea) Yoo H-w	18	18
Q1	(Japan) A Kugo (Japan) M Yokoyama	21	21
(Japan) N Fukuman (Japan) K Yonao	21	19	21
5	(South Korea) Jung K-e (South Korea) Shin S-c	19	21	17
(Chinese Taipei) Hsu Y-c (Chinese Taipei) Wu T-j	15	21	12
Q2	(Japan) M Kashihara (Japan) M Kato	21	18	21
(Japan) M Aratama (Japan) A Watanabe	21	21
4	(China) Chen QC (China) Jia YF	18	19
Q3	(South Korea) Kim H-n (South Korea) Kong H-y	21	21
(Denmark) J Finne-Ipsen (Denmark) R Søby	18	15
PFQ	(Japan) C Hoshi (Japan) N Shinoya	21	21
PFQ	(Japan) R Kawashima (Japan) S Ozaki	13	10
(China) Du Y (China) Xu Y	18	17
(Japan) A Sakuramoto (Japan) Y Takahata	21	21
(South Korea) Chae Y-j (South Korea) Kim S-y	21	20	21
2	(Denmark) K Rytter Juhl (Denmark) C Pedersen	15	22	18

Second round
Q1	(Japan) A Kugo (Japan) M Yokoyama	12	21	6
(Japan) N Fukuman (Japan) K Yonao	21	12	21
Q2	(Japan) M Kashihara (Japan) M Kato	21	17	17
(Japan) M Aratama (Japan) A Watanabe	14	21	21
Q3	(South Korea) Kim H-n (South Korea) Kong H-y	21	21
PFQ	(Japan) C Hoshi (Japan) N Shinoya	16	17
(Japan) A Sakuramoto (Japan) Y Takahata	21	15	15
(South Korea) Chae Y-j (South Korea) Kim S-y	19	21	21

Quarterfinals
(Japan) N Fukuman (Japan) K Yonao	21	21
(Japan) M Aratama (Japan) A Watanabe	14	10
Q3	(South Korea) Kim H-n (South Korea) Kong H-y	21	21
(South Korea) Chae Y-j (South Korea) Kim S-y	16	11

Semifinals
(Japan) N Fukuman (Japan) K Yonao	19	11
Q3	(South Korea) Kim H-n (South Korea) Kong H-y	21	21

=== Finals ===
Semifinals
1	(Japan) Misaki Matsutomo (Japan) Ayaka Takahashi	21	21
8	(Japan) Yuki Fukushima (Japan) Sayaka Hirota	11	15
(Japan) Naoko Fukuman (Japan) Kurumi Yonao	19	11
Q3	(South Korea) Kim Ha-na (South Korea) Kong Hee-yong	21	21

Final
1	(Japan) Misaki Matsutomo (Japan) Ayaka Takahashi	21	21
Q3	(South Korea) Kim Ha-na (South Korea) Kong Hee-yong	18	16

== Mixed doubles ==
=== Seeds ===
1. (China) Lu Kai / Huang Yaqiong (quarterfinals)
2. (China) Zhang Nan / Li Yinhui (withdrew)
3. (England) Chris Adcock / Gabrielle Adcock (first round)
4. (Indonesia) Praveen Jordan / Debby Susanto (semifinals)
5. (Thailand) Dechapol Puavaranukroh / Sapsiree Taerattanachai (withdrew)
6. (Indonesia) Tontowi Ahmad / Liliyana Natsir (withdrew)
7. (Malaysia) Tan Kian Meng / Lai Pei Jing (first round)
8. (South Korea) Choi Sol-gyu / Chae Yoo-jung (withdrew)

=== Top half ===
First round
1	(China) Lu K (China) Huang YQ	21	21
(Malaysia) Chan P S (Malaysia) Cheah Y S	17	17
(Japan) Y Kobayashi (Japan) M Matsutomo	21	19	21
(South Korea) Kim J-h (South Korea) Lee S-h	15	21	16
7	(Malaysia) Tan K M (Malaysia) Lai P J	20	21
(Thailand) B Isara (Thailand) S Amitrapai	22	23
(China) Wang YL (China) Huang DP	21	21
(Germany) M Lamsfuss (Germany) I Herttrich	19	16
4	(Indonesia) P Jordan (Indonesia) D Susanto	21	21
Q4	(China) Han CK (China) Du Y	19	18
PFQ	(Thailand) T Isriyanet (Thailand) P Chochuwong	17	13
Q3	(India) S Rankireddy (India) A Ponnappa	21	21
PFQ	(South Korea) Kim W-h (South Korea) Shin S-c	21	13	21
(Chinese Taipei) Tseng M-h (Chinese Taipei) Hu L-f	14	21	11
(Chinese Taipei) Wang C-l (Chinese Taipei) Lee C-h	21	21
(Denmark) A S Rasmussen (Denmark) L Kjaersfeldt	18	19

Second round
1	(China) Lu K (China) Huang YQ	21	21
(Japan) Y Kobayashi (Japan) M Matsutomo	13	13
(Thailand) B Isara (Thailand) S Amitrapai	19	17
(China) Wang YL (China) Huang DP	21	21
4	(Indonesia) P Jordan (Indonesia) D Susanto	29	16	21
Q3	(India) S Rankireddy (India) A Ponnappa	27	21	12
PFQ	(South Korea) Kim W-h (South Korea) Shin S-c	12	21	19
(Chinese Taipei) Wang C-l (Chinese Taipei) Lee C-h	21	14	21

Quarterfinals
1	(China) Lu K (China) Huang YQ	16	21	16
(China) Wang YL (China) Huang DP	21	16	21
4	(Indonesia) P Jordan (Indonesia) D Susanto	18	21	21
(Chinese Taipei) Wang C-l (Chinese Taipei) Lee C-h	21	18	16

Semifinals
(China) Wang YL (China) Huang DP	21	21
4	(Indonesia) P Jordan (Indonesia) D Susanto	14	19

=== Bottom half ===
First round
(Thailand) N Phuangphuapet (Thailand) J Kititharakul	17	8
Q1	(Japan) Y Kaneko (Japan) K Yonemoto	21	21
(India) P J Chopra (India) N. S Reddy	21	17	21
PFQ	(Japan) T Takashina (Japan) R Etoh	19	21	15
(Hong Kong) Tang C M (Hong Kong) Tse Y S	14	21	19
(South Korea) Seo S-j (South Korea) Kim H-n	21	17	21
(Chinese Taipei) Lee Y (Chinese Taipei) Hsu Y-c	24	21
3	(England) C Adcock (England) G Adcock	22	14
(Chinese Taipei) Lu C-y (Chinese Taipei) Chiang K-h	16	19
(Hong Kong) Lee C H (Hong Kong) Chau H W	21	21
(Japan) K Kazuno (Japan) A Kurihara	21	21
PFQ	(Germany) M E Seidel (Germany) L Efler	15	16
(Denmark) M Christiansen (Denmark) S Thygesen	14	21	19
(Malaysia) Goh S H (Malaysia) S J Lai	21	19	21
Q2	(Japan) T Hoki (Japan) S Hirota	21	21
PFQ	(Japan) K Gondo (Japan) W Nagahara	10	10

Second round
Q1	(Japan) Y Kaneko (Japan) K Yonemoto	13	17
(India) P J Chopra (India) N. S Reddy	21	21
(South Korea) Seo S-j (South Korea) Kim H-n	21	21
(Chinese Taipei) Lee Y (Chinese Taipei) Hsu Y-c	19	16
(Hong Kong) Lee C H (Hong Kong) Chau H W	23	21
(Japan) K Kazuno (Japan) A Kurihara	21	14
(Malaysia) Goh S H (Malaysia) S J Lai	16	25	20
Q2	(Japan) T Hoki (Japan) S Hirota	21	23	22

Quarterfinals
(India) P J Chopra (India) N. S Reddy	21	9	21
(South Korea) Seo S-j (South Korea) Kim H-n	18	21	19
(Hong Kong) Lee C H (Hong Kong) Chau H W	17	14
Q2	(Japan) T Hoki (Japan) S Hirota	21	21

Semifinals
(India) P J Chopra (India) N. S Reddy	21	15	19
Q2	(Japan) T Hoki (Japan) S Hirota	14	21	21

=== Finals ===
Semifinals
(China) Wang Yilu (China) Huang Dongping	21	21
4	(Indonesia) Praveen Jordan (Indonesia) Debby Susanto	14	19
(India) Pranaav Jerry Chopra (India) N. Sikki Reddy	21	15	19
Q2	(Japan) Takuro Hoki (Japan) Sayaka Hirota	14	21	21

Final
(China) Wang Yilu (China) Huang Dongping	21	21
Q2	(Japan) Takuro Hoki (Japan) Sayaka Hirota	13	8

Preceded by 2016 Japan Super Series	Japan Open	Succeeded by 2018 Japan Super Series
Preceded by 2017 Korea Open Super Series	BWF Super Series; 2017 BWF Season	Succeeded by 2017 Denmark Super Series Premier
