= 2018 German Open (badminton) =

2018 badminton tournament in Mülheim

Tournament details
- Dates: 6–11 March
- Edition: 61st
- Level: Super 300
- Total prize money: US$150,000
- Venue: Innogy Sporthalle
- Location: Mülheim, Germany

Champions
- Men's singles: (Chinese Taipei) Chou Tien-chen
- Women's singles: (Japan) Akane Yamaguchi
- Men's doubles: (Japan) Takuto Inoue (Japan) Yuki Kaneko
- Women's doubles: (Japan) Yuki Fukushima (Japan) Sayaka Hirota
- Mixed doubles: (Malaysia) Goh Soon Huat (Malaysia) Shevon Jemie Lai

The 2018 German Open, officially the Yonex German Open 2018, was a badminton tournament which took place at Innogy Sporthalle in Germany from 6 to 11 March 2018 and had a total purse of $150,000.

== Tournament ==
The 2018 German Open was the sixth tournament of the 2018 BWF World Tour and also part of the German Open championships which has been held since 1955. This tournament was organized by German Badminton Association and sanctioned by the BWF.

=== Venue ===
This international tournament was held at Innogy Sporthalle in Mülheim, North Rhine-Westphalia, Germany.

=== Point distribution ===
Below is a table with the point distribution for each phase of the tournament based on the BWF points system for the BWF World Tour Super 300 event.

Winner	Runner-up	3/4	5/8	9/16	17/32	33/64	65/128
7,000	5,950	4,900	3,850	2,750	1,670	660	320

=== Prize money ===
The total prize money for this tournament was US$150,000. Distribution of prize money was in accordance with BWF regulations.

Event	Winner	Finals	Semifinals	Quarterfinals	Last 16
Singles	$11,250	$5,700	$2,175	$900	$525
Doubles	$11,850	$5,700	$2,100	$1087.50	$562.50

== Men's singles ==
=== Seeds ===
1. (South Korea) Son Wan-ho (first round)
2. (China) Lin Dan (quarterfinals)
3. (China) Shi Yuqi (semifinals)
4. (Chinese Taipei) Chou Tien-chen (champion)
5. (Indonesia) Anthony Sinisuka Ginting (quarterfinals)
6. (Hong Kong) Ng Ka Long (final)
7. (Chinese Taipei) Wang Tzu-wei (first round)
8. (Indonesia) Jonatan Christie (quarterfinals)

=== Finals ===
Semifinals
(Japan) Kenta Nishimoto	11	21	13
4	(Chinese Taipei) Chou Tien-chen	21	14	21
3	(China) Shi Yuqi	18	21	17
6	(Hong Kong) Ng Ka Long	21	18	21

Final
4	(Chinese Taipei) Chou Tien-chen	21	18	21
6	(Hong Kong) Ng Ka Long	19	21	18

=== Top half ===
==== Section 1 ====
First Round
1	(South Korea) Son W-h	19	21	13
(Japan) K Nishimoto	21	11	21
(South Korea) Lee H-i	15	21	21
(Thailand) K Phetpradab	21	14	8
8	(Indonesia) J Christie	21	21
PFQ	(France) L Corvée	13	18
(France) B Leverdez	19	17
PFQ	(Spain) P Abián	21	21

Second Round
(Japan) K Nishimoto	21	21
(South Korea) Lee H-i	13	13
8	(Indonesia) J Christie	21	21
PFQ	(Spain) P Abián	14	9

Quarterfinals
(Japan) K Nishimoto	21	22
8	(Indonesia) J Christie	10	20

==== Section 2 ====
First Round
4	(Chinese Taipei) Chou T-c	21	21
(South Korea) Jeon H-j	18	11
(Hong Kong) Wong W K	12	11^{r}
PFQ	(India) S Dey	21	19
7	(Chinese Taipei) Wang T-w	18	15
PFQ	(Japan) K Momota	21	21
(Thailand) S Avihingsanon	21	22
(Chinese Taipei) Hsu J-h	15	20

Second Round
4	(Chinese Taipei) Chou T-c	21	21
PFQ	(India) S Dey	7	6
PFQ	(Japan) K Momota	21	21
(Thailand) S Avihingsanon	16	13

Quarterfinals
4	(Chinese Taipei) Chou T-c	21	14	21
PFQ	(Japan) K Momota	15	21	10

=== Bottom half ===
==== Section 3 ====
First Round
Q4	(Chinese Taipei) Kan C-y	17	20
(China) Huang YX	21	22
Q3	(Denmark) K Bruun	21	2^{r}
5	(Indonesia) A S Ginting	14	1
(Thailand) T Saensomboonsuk	18	12
PFQ	(Thailand) K Wangcharoen	21	21
Q1	(China) Zhao JP	17	21	19
3	(China) Shi YQ	21	16	21

Second Round
(China) Huang YX	15	3^{r}
5	(Indonesia) A S Ginting	21	5
PFQ	(Thailand) K Wangcharoen	11	5
3	(China) Shi YQ	21	21

Quarterfinals
5	(Indonesia) A S Ginting	17	21	18
3	(China) Shi YQ	21	18	21

==== Section 4 ====
First Round
(Netherlands) M Caljouw	21	21
Q2	(Finland) K Koljonen	13	12
PFQ	(Denmark) E Holst	18	11
6	(Hong Kong) Ng K L	21	21
(South Korea) Lee D-k	21	19
(Japan) K Tsuneyama	23	21
PFQ	(Russia) V Malkov	11	21
2	(China) Lin D	21	23

Second Round
(Netherlands) M Caljouw	18	14
6	(Hong Kong) Ng K L	21	21
(Japan) K Tsuneyama	22	14	18
2	(China) Lin D	20	21	21

Quarterfinals
6	(Hong Kong) Ng K L	21	22
2	(China) Lin D	16	20

== Women's singles ==
=== Seeds ===
1. (Japan) Akane Yamaguchi (champion)
2. (South Korea) Sung Ji-hyun (quarterfinals)
3. (Japan) Nozomi Okuhara (semifinals)
4. (China) Chen Yufei (final)
5. (United States) Beiwen Zhang (quarterfinals)
6. (Thailand) Nitchaon Jindapol (semifinals)
7. (Japan) Sayaka Sato (second round)
8. (Scotland) Kirsty Gilmour (first round)

=== Finals ===
Semifinals
1	(Japan) Akane Yamaguchi	23	21
3	(Japan) Nozomi Okuhara	21	12
4	(China) Chen Yufei	21	13	21
6	(Thailand) Nitchaon Jindapol	19	21	14

Final
1	(Japan) Akane Yamaguchi	21	6	21
4	(China) Chen Yufei	19	21	12

=== Top half ===
==== Section 1 ====
First Round
1	(Japan) A Yamaguchi	21	21
(Denmark) M Blichfeldt	10	13
(Denmark) L Kjærsfeldt	22	13
(Chinese Taipei) Pai Y-p	24	21
5	(United States) B Zhang	21	21
(Chinese Taipei) Lee C-h	14	16
(Japan) A Ohori	21	21
(Canada) M Li	19	14

Second Round
1	(Japan) A Yamaguchi	21	19	24
(Chinese Taipei) Pai Y-p	17	21	22
5	(United States) B Zhang	21	8	21
(Japan) A Ohori	17	21	10

Quarterfinals
1	(Japan) A Yamaguchi	21	21
5	(United States) B Zhang	17	13

==== Section 2 ====
First Round
3	(Japan) N Okuhara	22	21	21
(Hong Kong) Cheung N Y	24	13	15
Q4	(China) Gao FJ	21	21
(Spain) B Corrales	11	14
7	(Japan) S Sato	21	21
(Malaysia) Goh J W	15	10
Q3	(Germany) L Heim	16	13
(Japan) S Kawakami	21	21

Second Round
3	(Japan) N Okuhara	20	21	21
Q4	(China) Gao FJ	22	11	18
7	(Japan) S Sato	17	17
(Japan) S Kawakami	21	21

Quarterfinals
3	(Japan) N Okuhara	18	21	21
(Japan) S Kawakami	21	16	11

=== Bottom half ===
==== Section 3 ====
First Round
(Chinese Taipei) Chiang M-h	21	21
(Russia) E Kosetskaya	8	15
PFQ	(Canada) B Tam	21	13	21
8	(Scotland) K Gilmour	13	21	17
(Denmark) M Poulsen	15	21	19
Q2	(Turkey) N Yiğit	21	14	21
(Malaysia) S Cheah	11	13
4	(China) Chen YF	21	21

Second Round
(Chinese Taipei) Chiang M-h	21	14	21
PFQ	(Canada) B Tam	17	21	13
Q2	(Turkey) N Yiğit	14	17
4	(China) Chen YF	21	21

Quarterfinals
(Chinese Taipei) Chiang M-h	13	16
4	(China) Chen YF	21	21

==== Section 4 ====
First Round
(China) Chen XX	21	22
(South Korea) Lee J-m	16	20
Q1	(Indonesia) L A Mainaky	8	12
6	(Thailand) N Jindapol	21	21
(South Korea) Kim H-m	21	21
(Thailand) P Chochuwong	8	19
(Indonesia) Fitriani	12	16
2	(South Korea) Sung J-h	21	21

Second Round
(China) Chen XX	14	16
6	(Thailand) N Jindapol	21	21
(South Korea) Kim H-m	14	14
2	(South Korea) Sung J-h	21	21

Quarterfinals
6	(Thailand) N Jindapol	21	21
2	(South Korea) Sung J-h	12	17

== Men's doubles ==
=== Seeds ===
1. (Japan) Takeshi Kamura / Keigo Sonoda (second round)
2. (Denmark) Mads Conrad-Petersen / Mads Pieler Kolding (quarterfinals)
3. (Chinese Taipei) Chen Hung-ling / Wang Chi-lin (first round)
4. (Chinese Taipei) Lee Jhe-huei / Lee Yang (quarterfinals)
5. (Denmark) Kim Astrup / Anders Skaarup Rasmussen (second round)
6. (Japan) Takuto Inoue / Yuki Kaneko (champions)
7. (Indonesia) Fajar Alfian / Muhammad Rian Ardianto (final)
8. (Chinese Taipei) Lu Ching-yao / Yang Po-han (first round)

=== Finals ===
Semifinals
7	(Indonesia) Fajar Alfian (Indonesia) Muhammad Rian Ardianto	22	22
(Indonesia) Mohammad Ahsan (Indonesia) Hendra Setiawan	20	20
6	(Japan) Takuto Inoue (Japan) Yuki Kaneko	21	18	21
(Malaysia) Goh V Shem (Malaysia) Tan Wee Kiong	17	21	19

Final
7	(Indonesia) Fajar Alfian (Indonesia) Muhammad Rian Ardianto	16	18
6	(Japan) Takuto Inoue (Japan) Yuki Kaneko	21	21

=== Top half ===
==== Section 1 ====
First Round
1	(Japan) T Kamura (Japan) K Sonoda	21	21
Q4	(India) Arjun M.R. (India) R Shlok	13	18
Q1	(Thailand) P Kuna-anuvit (Thailand) N Trinkajee	15	10
(South Korea) Kim W-h (South Korea) Seo S-j	21	21
7	(Indonesia) F Alfian (Indonesia) M R Ardianto	21	19	21
(China) He JT (China) Tan Q	18	21	16
(England) P Briggs (England) T Wolfenden	19	21	17
Q3	(Germany) R Beck (Republic of Ireland) S Magee	21	18	21

Second Round
1	(Japan) T Kamura (Japan) K Sonoda	17	19
(South Korea) Kim W-h (South Korea) Seo S-j	21	21
7	(Indonesia) F Alfian (Indonesia) M R Ardianto	21	21
Q3	(Germany) R Beck (Republic of Ireland) S Magee	14	17

Quarterfinals
(South Korea) Kim W-h (South Korea) Seo S-j	16	16
7	(Indonesia) F Alfian (Indonesia) M R Ardianto	21	21

==== Section 2 ====
First Round
4	(Chinese Taipei) Lee J-h (Chinese Taipei) Lee Y	17	21	22
(Malaysia) Ong Y S (Malaysia) Teo E Y	21	15	20
(Indonesia) A Pratama (Indonesia) R A Saputro	21	18	21
(South Korea) Chung E-s (South Korea) Kim D-y	10	21	10
5	(Denmark) K Astrup (Denmark) A S Rasmussen	w	/	o
(Japan) T Hoki (Japan) Y Kobayashi
(England) M Ellis (England) C Langridge	16	14
(Indonesia) M Ahsan (Indonesia) H Setiawan	21	21

Second Round
4	(Chinese Taipei) Lee J-h (Chinese Taipei) Lee Y	21	21
(Indonesia) A Pratama (Indonesia) R A Saputro	19	15
5	(Denmark) K Astrup (Denmark) A S Rasmussen	17	21	16
(Indonesia) M Ahsan (Indonesia) H Setiawan	21	11	21

Quarterfinals
4	(Chinese Taipei) Lee J-h (Chinese Taipei) Lee Y	13	20
(Indonesia) M Ahsan (Indonesia) H Setiawan	21	22

=== Bottom half ===
==== Section 3 ====
First Round
(Germany) J R Jansen (Germany) J Zurwonne	15	17
PFQ	(China) Han CK (China) Zhou HD	21	21
(Netherlands) J Arends (Netherlands) R Jille	16	12
6	(Japan) T Inoue (Japan) Y Kaneko	21	21
(Germany) M Lamsfuß (Germany) M Seidel	17	17
(Chinese Taipei) Liao M-c (Chinese Taipei) Su C-h	21	21
(Netherlands) J Maas (Netherlands) R Tabeling	21	17	22
3	(Chinese Taipei) Chen H-l (Chinese Taipei) Wang C-l	19	21	20

Second Round
PFQ	(China) Han CK (China) Zhou HD	9	20
6	(Japan) T Inoue (Japan) Y Kaneko	21	22
(Chinese Taipei) Liao M-c (Chinese Taipei) Su C-h	21	18	21
(Netherlands) J Maas (Netherlands) R Tabeling	15	21	17

Quarterfinals
6	(Japan) T Inoue (Japan) Y Kaneko	21	21
(Chinese Taipei) Liao M-c (Chinese Taipei) Su C-h	19	19

==== Section 4 ====
First Round
(Japan) H Endo (Japan) Y Watanabe	16	21	16
(Malaysia) Goh V S (Malaysia) Tan W K	21	17	21
(Thailand) T Isriyanet (Thailand) K Namdash	16	21	21
8	(Chinese Taipei) Lu C-y (Chinese Taipei) Yang P-h	21	19	19
Q2	(Denmark) K Antonsen (Denmark) N Nøhr	21	21
(India) M Attri (India) B. S Reddy	16	16
(Thailand) K Kedren (Thailand) D Puavaranukroh	19	13
2	(Denmark) M C-Petersen (Denmark) M P Kolding	21	21

Second Round
(Malaysia) Goh V S (Malaysia) Tan W K	21	21
(Thailand) T Isriyanet (Thailand) K Namdash	15	16
Q2	(Denmark) K Antonsen (Denmark) N Nøhr	16	12
2	(Denmark) M C-Petersen (Denmark) M P Kolding	21	21

Quarterfinals
(Malaysia) Goh V S (Malaysia) Tan W K	21	13
2	(Denmark) M C-Petersen (Denmark) M P Kolding	19	7^{r}

== Women's doubles ==
=== Seeds ===
1. (China) Chen Qingchen / Jia Yifan (quarterfinals)
2. (Japan) Misaki Matsutomo / Ayaka Takahashi (withdrew)
3. (Japan) Yuki Fukushima / Sayaka Hirota (champions)
4. (Japan) Shiho Tanaka / Koharu Yonemoto (second round)
5. (South Korea) Lee So-hee / Shin Seung-chan (first round)
6. (Thailand) Jongkolphan Kititharakul / Rawinda Prajongjai (quarterfinals)
7. (South Korea) Chang Ye-na / Kim Hye-rin (semifinals)
8. (Indonesia) Della Destiara Haris / Rizki Amelia Pradipta (second round)

=== Finals ===
Semifinals
7	(South Korea) Chang Ye-na (South Korea) Kim Hye-rin	27	18
Q1	(China) Huang Dongping (China) Zheng Yu	29	21
3	(Japan) Yuki Fukushima (Japan) Sayaka Hirota	21	21
(Bulgaria) Gabriela Stoeva (Bulgaria) Stefani Stoeva	18	11

Final
Q1	(China) Huang Dongping (China) Zheng Yu	21	14	6
3	(Japan) Yuki Fukushima (Japan) Sayaka Hirota	18	21	21

=== Top half ===
==== Section 1 ====
First Round
1	(China) Chen QC (China) Jia YF	21	21
PFQ	(Thailand) S Paewsampran (Thailand) P Supajirakul	14	18
(Denmark) J F-Ipsen (Denmark) R Søby	14	11
(South Korea) Kim S-y (South Korea) Kong H-y	21	21
7	(South Korea) Chang Y-n (South Korea) Kim H-r	21	21
(Thailand) C Chaladchalam (Thailand) P Muenwong	17	16
(Netherlands) S Piek (Netherlands) C Seinen	20	14
(Germany) I Herttrich (Germany) C Nelte	22	21

Second Round
1	(China) Chen QC (China) Jia YF	25	16	21
(South Korea) Kim S-y (South Korea) Kong H-y	23	21	18
7	(South Korea) Chang Y-n (South Korea) Kim H-r	17	21	26
(Germany) I Herttrich (Germany) C Nelte	21	18	24

Quarterfinals
1	(China) Chen QC (China) Jia YF	19	13
7	(South Korea) Chang Y-n (South Korea) Kim H-r	21	21

==== Section 2 ====
First Round
4	(Japan) S Tanaka (Japan) K Yonemoto	21	21
Q3	(Denmark) A Bøje (Denmark) S Lundgaard	10	9
PFQ	(Netherlands) D Jille (Netherlands) I van der Aar	13	13
(South Korea) Chae Y-j (South Korea) Jung K-e	21	21
5	(South Korea) Lee S-h (South Korea) Shin S-c	19	21	15
Q1	(China) Huang DP (China) Zheng Y	21	15	21
(Chinese Taipei) Chiang K-h (Chinese Taipei) Hung S-h	21	23
PFQ	(France) D Delrue (France) L Palermo	13	21

Second Round
4	(Japan) S Tanaka (Japan) K Yonemoto	9	15
(South Korea) Chae Y-j (South Korea) Jung K-e	21	21
Q1	(China) Huang DP (China) Zheng Y	21	21
(Chinese Taipei) Chiang K-h (Chinese Taipei) Hung S-h	11	9

Quarterfinals
(South Korea) Chae Y-j (South Korea) Jung K-e	19	12
Q1	(China) Huang DP (China) Zheng Y	21	21

=== Bottom half ===
==== Section 3 ====
First Round
(Denmark) M Fruergaard (Denmark) S Thygesen	21	21
Q4	(Germany) L Kaminski (Germany) H Pohl	10	11
(Russia) A Chervyakova (Russia) O Morozova	19	16
8	(Indonesia) D D Haris (Indonesia) R A Pradipta	21	21
Q2	(China) Tang JH (China) Yu XH	18	14
(Japan) M Matsumoto (Japan) W Nagahara	21	21
(Thailand) S Amitrapai (Thailand) P Chochuwong	16	15
3	(Japan) Y Fukushima (Japan) S Hirota	21	21

Second Round
(Denmark) M Fruergaard (Denmark) S Thygesen	21	14	21
8	(Indonesia) D D Haris (Indonesia) R A Pradipta	8	21	11
(Japan) M Matsumoto (Japan) W Nagahara	15	12
3	(Japan) Y Fukushima (Japan) S Hirota	21	21

Quarterfinals
(Denmark) M Fruergaard (Denmark) S Thygesen	11	14
3	(Japan) Y Fukushima (Japan) S Hirota	21	21

==== Section 4 ====
First Round
(England) C Birch (England) J Pugh	21	26	7
(Indonesia) A S Awanda (Indonesia) N K M Istirani	19	28	21
PFQ	(Sweden) A Högström (Sweden) C Nistad	11	7
6	(Thailand) J Kititharakul (Thailand) R Prajongjai	21	21
(Bulgaria) G Stoeva (Bulgaria) S Stoeva	21	21	21
(Chinese Taipei) Hsu Y-c (Chinese Taipei) Wu T-j	23	13	11
(England) L Smith (England) S Walker	15	11
PFQ	(China) Du Y (China) Li YH	21	21

Second Round
(Indonesia) A S Awanda (Indonesia) N K M Istirani	6	19
6	(Thailand) J Kititharakul (Thailand) R Prajongjai	21	21
(Bulgaria) G Stoeva (Bulgaria) S Stoeva	20	21	21
PFQ	(China) Du Y (China) Li YH	22	9	12

Quarterfinals
6	(Thailand) J Kititharakul (Thailand) R Prajongjai	11	9
(Bulgaria) G Stoeva (Bulgaria) S Stoeva	21	21

== Mixed doubles ==
=== Seeds ===
1. (Hong Kong) Tang Chun Man / Tse Ying Suet (second round)
2. (South Korea) Seo Seung-jae / Kim Ha-na (second round)
3. (Malaysia) Goh Soon Huat / Shevon Jemie Lai (champions)
4. (Malaysia) Tan Kian Meng / Lai Pei Jing (first round)
5. (Thailand) Dechapol Puavaranukroh / Sapsiree Taerattanachai (quarterfinals)
6. (Malaysia) Chan Peng Soon / Goh Liu Ying (first round)
7. (Hong Kong) Lee Chun Hei / Chau Hoi Wah (first round)
8. (South Korea) Choi Sol-gyu / Chae Yoo-jung (semifinals)

=== Finals ===
Semifinals
(China) He Jiting (China) Du Yue	19	21	17
(Denmark) Niclas Nøhr (Denmark) Sara Thygesen	21	19	21
3	(Malaysia) Goh Soon Huat (Malaysia) Shevon Jemie Lai	23	23	21
8	(South Korea) Choi Sol-gyu (South Korea) Chae Yoo-jung	21	25	13

Final
(Denmark) Niclas Nøhr (Denmark) Sara Thygesen	14	20
3	(Malaysia) Goh Soon Huat (Malaysia) Shevon Jemie Lai	21	22

=== Top half ===
==== Section 1 ====
First Round
1	(Hong Kong) Tang C M (Hong Kong) Tse Y S	19	21	21
(Germany) M Lamsfuß (Germany) I Herttrich	21	10	18
(China) He JT (China) Du Y	21	21
PFQ	(Finland) A Kaisti (Finland) J Nyström	14	13
7	(Hong Kong) Lee C H (Hong Kong) Chau H W	17	21	17
PFQ	(Thailand) T Isriyanet (Thailand) P Chochuwong	21	19	21
(India) P Chopra (India) N. S Reddy	24	17	21
Q4	(Chinese Taipei) Chang K-c (Chinese Taipei) Cheng C-y	22	21	19

Second Round
1	(Hong Kong) Tang C M (Hong Kong) Tse Y S	21	18	19
(China) He JT (China) Du Y	16	21	21
PFQ	(Thailand) T Isriyanet (Thailand) P Chochuwong	21	21
(India) P Chopra (India) N. S Reddy	18	19

Quarterfinals
(China) He JT (China) Du Y	21	21
PFQ	(Thailand) T Isriyanet (Thailand) P Chochuwong	13	10

==== Section 2 ====
First Round
4	(Malaysia) Tan K M (Malaysia) Lai P J	17	13
(Denmark) N Nøhr (Denmark) S Thygesen	21	21
(Chinese Taipei) Wang C-l (Chinese Taipei) Lee C-h	21	21
(Indonesia) H Faizal (Indonesia) G E Widjaja	17	19
6	(Malaysia) Chan P S (Malaysia) Goh L Y	19	18
Q2	(Indonesia) P Jordan (Indonesia) M D Oktavianti	21	21
(Netherlands) J Arends (Netherlands) S Piek	21	25
(Denmark) J F Nielsen (Denmark) A Bøje	19	23

Second Round
(Denmark) N Nøhr (Denmark) S Thygesen	21	21	21
(Chinese Taipei) Wang C-l (Chinese Taipei) Lee C-h	23	15	14
Q2	(Indonesia) P Jordan (Indonesia) M D Oktavianti	25	14	21
(Netherlands) J Arends (Netherlands) S Piek	23	21	10

Quarterfinals
(Denmark) N Nøhr (Denmark) S Thygesen	17	24	21
Q2	(Indonesia) P Jordan (Indonesia) M D Oktavianti	21	22	16

=== Bottom half ===
==== Section 3 ====
First Round
PFQ	(Netherlands) J Maas (Netherlands) I van der Aar	21	14	21
PFQ	(Japan) T Hoki (Japan) M Matsumoto	19	21	16
(Denmark) M Mikkelsen (Denmark) M Surrow	21	21	14
5	(Thailand) D Puavaranukroh (Thailand) S Taerattanachai	23	15	21
(Chinese Taipei) Lee Y (Chinese Taipei) Hsu Y-c	21	18	21
(Netherlands) R Tabeling (Netherlands) C Seinen	13	21	15
(Republic of Ireland) S Magee (Republic of Ireland) C Magee	21	17	17
3	(Malaysia) Goh S H (Malaysia) S J Lai	15	21	21

Second Round
PFQ	(Netherlands) J Maas (Netherlands) I van der Aar	19	16
5	(Thailand) D Puavaranukroh (Thailand) S Taerattanachai	21	21
(Chinese Taipei) Lee Y (Chinese Taipei) Hsu Y-c	16	15
3	(Malaysia) Goh S H (Malaysia) S J Lai	21	21

Quarterfinals
5	(Thailand) D Puavaranukroh (Thailand) S Taerattanachai	14	21	21
3	(Malaysia) Goh S H (Malaysia) S J Lai	21	18	23

==== Section 4 ====
First Round
(Japan) Y Watanabe (Japan) A Higashino	21	21
Q1	(Japan) Y Kaneko (Japan) K Yonemoto	13	15
Q3	(France) T Gicquel (France) D Delrue	12	20
8	(South Korea) Choi S-g (South Korea) Chae Y-j	21	22
(Germany) M Seidel (Germany) L Efler	17	5
(England) M Ellis (England) L Smith	21	21
(Chinese Taipei) Lu C-y (Chinese Taipei) Chiang K-h	19	21	17
2	(South Korea) Seo S-j (South Korea) Kim H-n	21	12	21

Second Round
(Japan) Y Watanabe (Japan) A Higashino	19	18
8	(South Korea) Choi S-g (South Korea) Chae Y-j	21	21
(England) M Ellis (England) L Smith	25	21
2	(South Korea) Seo S-j (South Korea) Kim H-n	23	19

Quarterfinals
8	(South Korea) Choi S-g (South Korea) Chae Y-j	21	21
(England) M Ellis (England) L Smith	13	15

Preceded by 2018 Swiss Open	BWF World Tour; 2018 BWF season	Succeeded by 2018 All England Open
