= 2012 BWF World Junior Championships – Boys doubles =

The Boys Doubles tournament of the 2012 BWF World Junior Championships was held from October 30 until November 3. Nelson Heg Wei Keat and Teo Ee Yi from Malaysia were the winner of the last edition.

This edition, the title won by Hong Kong pair Lee Chun Hei and Ng Ka Long after beating Japanese pair Takuto Inoue and Yuki Kaneko 21-16, 21-17 in the final. This was the first title ever for Hong Kong.

== Seeded ==
1. (Indonesia) Hafiz Faizal / Putra Eka Rhoma (third round)
2. (Indonesia) Arya Maulana Aldiartama / Edi Subaktiar (quarter-final)
3. (Hong Kong) Lee Chun Hei / Ng Ka Long (champion)
4. (Chinese Taipei) Wang Chi-lin / Wu Hsiao-lin (quarter-final)
5. (Indonesia) Rafiddias Akhdan Nugroho / Kevin Sanjaya Sukamuljo (third round)
6. (France) Antoine Lodiot / Julien Maio (third round)
7. (Japan) Takuto Inoue / Yuki Kaneko (final)
8. (Denmark) Mathias Christiansen / David Daugaard (quarter-final)

== Draw ==
=== Finals ===
Quarterfinals
(China) Pei Tianyi (China) Zhang Ningyi	21	21
5/8	(Denmark) Mathias Christiansen (Denmark) David Daugaard	16	17
3/4	(Chinese Taipei) Wang Chi-lin (Chinese Taipei) Wu Hsiao-lin	19	27	17
5/8	(Japan) Takuto Inoue (Japan) Yuki Kaneko	21	25	21
(South Korea) Kim Jae-hwan (South Korea) Kim Jung-ho	8	17
3/4	(Hong Kong) Lee Chun Hei (Hong Kong) Ng Ka Long	21	21
(China) Wang Yilu (China) Liu Yuchen	21	24
2	(Indonesia) Arya Maulana Aldiartama (Indonesia) Edi Subaktiar	15	22

Semifinals
(China) Pei Tianyi (China) Zhang Ningyi	18	13
5/8	(Japan) Takuto Inoue (Japan) Yuki Kaneko	21	21
3/4	(Hong Kong) Lee Chun Hei (Hong Kong) Ng Ka Long	21	21
(China) Wang Yilu (China) Liu Yuchen	10	11

Final
5/8	(Japan) Takuto Inoue (Japan) Yuki Kaneko	16	17
3/4	(Hong Kong) Lee Chun Hei (Hong Kong) Ng Ka Long	21	21

=== Top Half ===
==== Section 1 ====
First Round
1	(Indonesia) H Faisal (Indonesia) P Rhoma
BYE
(India) G Raju (India) H Thandarang	18	21	7
(South Korea) Jeon H-j (South Korea) Seo S-j	21	18	21
(Czech Republic) A Mendrek (Czech Republic) M Svetnicka	13	10
(Japan) Y Kobayashi (Japan) A Koga	21	21
(Sri Lanka) H Hettiarachcige (Sri Lanka) I Kahingalage	5	11
(China) Pei TY (China) Zhang NY	21	21

Second Round
1	(Indonesia) H Faizal (Indonesia) P Rhoma	22	21
(South Korea) Jeon H-j (South Korea) Seo S-j	20	16
(Japan) Y Kobayashi (Japan) A Koga	13	19
(China) Pei TY (China) Zhang NY	21	21

Third Round
1	(Indonesia) H Faizal (Indonesia) P Rhoma	21	22
(China) Pei TY (China) Zhang NY	23	24

==== Section 2 ====
First Round
5/8	(Denmark) M Christiansen (Denmark) D Daugaard
BYE
(Netherlands) R Muns (Netherlands) R Tabeling	23	21
(Chinese Taipei) Hsueh A-t (Chinese Taipei) Tsai C-y	21	15
(Bulgaria) S Garev (Bulgaria) V Shishkov	17	15
(Hong Kong) Chang T C (Hong Kong) Tang C M	21	21
(Republic of Ireland) J Dolan (Republic of Ireland) J Magee	21	18
(Thailand) N Kitphaibool (Thailand) P Bowornwatanuwong	23	21

Second Round
5/8	(Denmark) M Christiansen (Denmark) D Daugaard	19	21	21
(Netherlands) R Muns (Netherlands) R Tabeling	21	18	15
(Hong Kong) Chang T C (Hong Kong) Tang C M	21	9	21
(Thailand) N Kitphaibool (Thailand) P Bowornwatanuwong	18	21	18

Third Round
5/8	(Denmark) M Christiansen (Denmark) D Daugaard	19	21	21
(Hong Kong) Chang T C (Hong Kong) Tang C M	21	16	11

==== Section 3 ====
First Round
3/4	(Chinese Taipei) Wang C-l (Chinese Taipei) Wu H-l
BYE
(England) R Walker (England) T Wolfenden	21	19	21
(Russia) A Butovetstkiy (Russia) S Shemetov	15	21	13
(Germany) J Pistorius (Germany) M Seidel	18	19
(Vietnam) Do TD (Vietnam) Pham HN	21	21
(South Korea) Choi S-g (South Korea) Park S-w	21	23
(United States) P Chew (United States) J Kuo	12	21

Second Round
3/4	(Chinese Taipei) Wang C-l (Chinese Taipei) Wu H-l	21	21
(England) R Walker (England) T Wolfenden	16	8
(Vietnam) Do TD (Vietnam) Pham HN	10	8
(South Korea) Choi S-g (South Korea) Park S-w	21	21

Third Round
3/4	(Chinese Taipei) Wang C-l (Chinese Taipei) Wu H-l	21	21
(South Korea) Choi S-g (South Korea) Park S-w	12	17

==== Section 4 ====
First Round
5/8	(Japan) T Inoue (Japan) Y Kaneko	21	21
(Turkey) K Avsar (Turkey) E Ceylan	10	12
(Singapore) T Hee (Singapore) M Ishak	21	22
(Australia) D Guda (Australia) A Selladurai	17	20
(Philippines) V Manuel (Philippines) A Morada	21	20	21
(Canada) M Lee (Canada) N Osborne	15	22	16
(South Africa) A Malan (South Africa) R Naidoo	14	13
(Malaysia) D Devadass (Malaysia) Ong YS	21	21

Second Round
5/8	(Japan) T Inoue (Japan) Y Kaneko	21	21
(Singapore) T Hee (Singapore) M Ishak	12	9
(Philippines) V Manuel (Philippines) A Morada	5	11
(Malaysia) D Devadass (Malaysia) Ong YS	21	21

Third Round
5/8	(Japan) T Inoue (Japan) Y Kaneko	21	21
(Malaysia) D Devadass (Malaysia) Ong YS	18	17

=== Bottom Half ===
==== Section 5 ====
First Round
(Ukraine) V Gurkalo (Ukraine) M Kosovan	10	11
(United States) M Buasan (United States) A Shekhtmann	21	21
(South Africa) C Coetzer (South Africa) K Jacobs	10	10
(South Korea) Kim J-h (South Korea) Kim J-h	'21	21
(Sweden) J Forsberg (Sweden) C Nilsson	17	15
(Russia) R Kargaev (Russia) A Zinchenko	21	21
(England) A Lane (England) S Parsons	16	10
5/8	(Indonesia) R Nugroho (Indonesia) K Sukamuljo	21	21

Second Round
(United States) M Buasan (United States) A Shekhtmann	13	9
(South Korea) Kim J-h (South Korea) Kim J-h	21	21
(Russia) R Kargaev (Russia) A Zinchenko	16	10
5/8	(Indonesia) R Nugroho (Indonesia) K Sukamuljo	21	21

Third Round
(South Korea) Kim J-h (South Korea) Kim J-h	21	16	24
5/8	(Indonesia) R Nugroho (Indonesia) K Sukamuljo	17	21	22

==== Section 6 ====
First Round
(Uzbekistan) A Bakhshullaev (Uzbekistan) A Savatyugin	9	9
(Netherlands) V de Vries (Netherlands) J Teeuwen	21	21
(Singapore) S Lee (Singapore) G Ong	21	21
(Belgium) N Marcoen (Belgium) S van den Broeck	16	13
(Malaysia) Tai AK (Malaysia) Tan WG	21	21
(Canada) M Downton (Canada) S Dunner	10	10
BYE
3/4	(Hong Kong) Lee CH (Hong Kong) Ng KL

Second Round
(Netherlands) V de Vries (Netherlands) J Teeuwen	18	21	18
(Singapore) S Lee (Singapore) G Ong	21	16	21
(Malaysia) Tai AK (Malaysia) Tan WG	16	17
3/4	(Hong Kong) Lee CH (Hong Kong) Ng KL	21	21

Third Round
(Singapore) S Lee (Singapore) G Ong	14	12
3/4	(Hong Kong) Lee CH (Hong Kong) Ng KL	21	21

==== Section 7 ====
First Round
(India) Venkatesh B. (India) S Ravuri	21	21
(Sri Lanka) S Hapuarachchi (Sri Lanka) R Ranatunga	3	11
(Thailand) D Puavaranukroh (Thailand) K Kedren	12	18
(China) Wang YL (China) Liu YC	21	21
(Austria) M Almer (Austria) D Stipsits	21	21
(Australia) C Chen (Australia) S Serasinghe	15	13
BYE
5/8	(France) A Lodiot (France) J Maio

Second Round
(India) Venkatesh B. (India) S Ravuri	6	13
(China) Wang YL (China) Liu YC	21	21
(Austria) M Almer (Austria) D Stipsits	14	18
5/8	(France) A Lodiot (France) J Maio	21	21

Third Round
(China) Wang YL (China) Liu YC	21	21
5/8	(France) A Lodiot (France) J Maio	11	10

==== Section 8 ====
First Round
(Philippines) C Canayan (Philippines) G Sibayan	21	16	21
(Turkey) Y Bay (Turkey) S Zorlu	10	21	16
(Germany) M Byerly (Germany) M Lamsfuss	14	21	11
(Malaysia) D Philip (Malaysia) M Simon	21	16	21
(Japan) K Matsui (Japan) K Miura	17	21	15
(Chinese Taipei) Chang K-c (Chinese Taipei) Liao C-h	21	16	21
BYE
2	(Indonesia) A Aldiartama (Indonesia) E Subaktiar

Second Round
(Philippines) C Canayan (Philippines) G Sibayan	17	21
(Malaysia) D Philip (Malaysia) M Simon	21	23
(Chinese Taipei) Chang K-c (Chinese Taipei) Liao C-h	12	14
2	(Indonesia) A Aldiartama (Indonesia) E Subaktiar	21	21

Third Round
(Malaysia) D Philip (Malaysia) M Simon	9	16
(Indonesia) A Aldiartama (Indonesia) E Subaktiar	21	21
