= Yuki Kaneko (badminton) =

Japanese former badminton player and coach (born 1994)

Yūki Kaneko
Personal information
- Born: 22 July 1994 (age 32) Koshigaya, Saitama, Japan
- Height: 1.79 m (5 ft 10 in)
- Weight: 67 kg (148 lb)
- Spouse: Ayaka Takahashi (m. 2020)

Sport
- Country: Japan
- Sport: Badminton
- Handedness: Left
- Coached by: Jeremy Gan
- Retired: 31 March 2025

Men's & mixed doubles
- Highest ranking: 7 (MD with Takuto Inoue 12 July 2018); 12 (XD with Misaki Matsutomo 27 December 2022)
- BWF profile
Medal record
Men's badminton
Representing Japan
Sudirman Cup
Silver medal – second place	2021 Vantaa	Mixed team
Thomas Cup
Silver medal – second place	2018 Bangkok	Men's team
Asian Games
Bronze medal – third place	2018 Jakarta–Palembang	Men's team
Asia Mixed Team Championships
Silver medal – second place	2019 Hong Kong	Mixed team
World Junior Championships
Silver medal – second place	2012 Chiba	Boys' doubles
Silver medal – second place	2012 Chiba	Mixed team
Asian Junior Championships
Gold medal – first place	2012 Gimcheon	Mixed team

Yuki Kaneko (金子 祐樹, Kaneko Yūki; born 22 July 1994) is a Japanese former badminton player who is currently a doubles coach for the BIPROGY (formerly Unisys). Primarily competing in men's doubles with Takuto Inoue, Kaneko reached a career-high ranking of world No. 7 on 12 July 2018. Together, they won a BWF Grand Prix Gold title at the 2017 U.S. Open and a BWF World Tour Super 300 title at the 2018 German Open. They also became the first Japanese men's doubles pair since 1982 to reach the final of their home tournament, the 2017 Japan Open Super Series, and were runners-up at the 2018 Indonesia Open Super 1000.

Kaneko later transitioned to mixed doubles, partnering Misaki Matsutomo, with whom he achieved a career-high ranking of world No. 12 on 27 December 2022. Their achievements include being runners-up at the 2021 All England Open Super 1000 and the 2023 Syed Modi International Super 300. In team competitions, Kaneko earned silver medals at the 2021 Sudirman Cup, the 2018 Thomas Cup and the 2019 Asia Mixed Team Championships, and a bronze medal at the 2018 Asian Games men's team event.

== Career ==
=== Junior career ===
During his junior career, Kaneko secured two silver medals at the 2012 World Junior Championships in Chiba: one in boys' doubles with Takuto Inoue, finishing runners-up to Hong Kong's Lee Chun Hei and Ng Ka Long, and another in the mixed team event. He also contributed to Japan's mixed team gold medal at the 2012 Asian Junior Championships in Gimcheon.

=== Senior career ===
Kaneko began his senior career in men's doubles with Takuto Inoue. On the International Challenge circuit, they won their first senior international title at the 2013 Romanian International. They also won the 2017 Austrian Open and were runners-up at the 2015 Osaka International.

On the BWF Grand Prix circuit, Kaneko and Inoue secured their first Grand Prix Gold title at the 2017 U.S. Open, defeating top-seeded Chinese Taipei pair Lu Ching-yao and Yang Po-han. They were also runners-up at four other Grand Prix events: the 2014 Russia Open, 2016 Thailand Open, 2017 China Masters, and 2017 Dutch Open. During the 2016 Thailand Open, they upset the top-seeded Malaysian pair Koo Kien Keat and Tan Boon Heong in the opening round.

At the BWF Super Series level, Kaneko and Inoue became the first Japanese men's doubles pair since 1982 to reach the final of their home tournament, the 2017 Japan Open. They defeated 2016 All England Open champions Vladimir Ivanov and Ivan Sozonov in the semifinals before finishing as runners-up to Marcus Fernaldi Gideon and Kevin Sanjaya Sukamuljo.

With the introduction of the BWF World Tour in 2018, Kaneko and Inoue won their first BWF World Tour title at the 2018 German Open Super 300 by defeating Fajar Alfian and Muhammad Rian Ardianto. That same year, they were runners-up at the Super 1000 Indonesia Open, once again losing to Gideon and Sukamuljo. The pair achieved their career-high ranking of world No. 7 on 12 July 2018.

Kaneko later transitioned to mixed doubles with Misaki Matsutomo. They finished as runner-up at the 2021 All England Open Super 1000, losing to compatriots Yuta Watanabe and Arisa Higashino. They were also runners-up at the 2023 Syed Modi International Super 300. They reached a career-high ranking of world No. 12 on 27 December 2022.

In team competitions, Kaneko earned silver medals at the 2021 Sudirman Cup, the 2018 Thomas Cup and the 2019 Asia Mixed Team Championships, and a bronze medal at the 2018 Asian Games men's team event.

Kaneko retired from his playing career on 31 March 2025, and subsequently became a doubles coach for his longtime team, BIPROGY.

== Personal life ==
In 2020, Kaneko married retired badminton player Ayaka Takahashi, a former teammate on both the Japanese national team and the BIPROGY (formerly Unisys) team. His mixed doubles partner, Misaki Matsutomo, was Takahashi's longtime women's doubles partner.

== Achievements ==
=== World Junior Championships ===
Boys' doubles
Year	Venue	Partner	Opponent	Score	Result	Ref.
2012	Chiba Port Arena; Chiba, Japan	(Japan) Takuto Inoue	(Hong Kong) Lee Chun Hei (Hong Kong) Ng Ka Long	16–21, 17–21	Silver	

=== BWF World Tour (1 title, 3 runners-up) ===
The BWF World Tour, which was announced on 19 March 2017 and implemented in 2018, is a series of elite badminton tournaments sanctioned by the Badminton World Federation (BWF). The BWF World Tour is divided into levels of World Tour Finals, Super 1000, Super 750, Super 500, Super 300 (part of the HSBC World Tour), and the BWF Tour Super 100.

Men's doubles
Year	Tournament	Level	Partner	Opponent	Score	Result	Ref.
2018	German Open	Super 300	(Japan) Takuto Inoue	(Indonesia) Fajar Alfian (Indonesia) Muhammad Rian Ardianto	21–16, 21–18	(gold) Winner	
2018	Indonesia Open	Super 1000	(Japan) Takuto Inoue	(Indonesia) Marcus Fernaldi Gideon (Indonesia) Kevin Sanjaya Sukamuljo	13–21, 16–21	(silver) Runner-up	

Mixed doubles
Year	Tournament	Level	Partner	Opponent	Score	Result	Ref.
2021	All England Open	Super 1000	(Japan) Misaki Matsutomo	(Japan) Yuta Watanabe (Japan) Arisa Higashino	14–21, 13–21	(silver) Runner-up	
2023	Syed Modi International	Super 300	(Japan) Misaki Matsutomo	(Indonesia) Dejan Ferdinansyah (Indonesia) Gloria Emanuelle Widjaja	22–20, 19–21, 23–25	(silver) Runner-up	

=== BWF Superseries (1 runner-up) ===
The BWF Superseries, which was launched on 14 December 2006 and implemented in 2007, was a series of elite badminton tournaments, sanctioned by the Badminton World Federation (BWF). BWF Superseries levels were Superseries and Superseries Premier. A season of Superseries consisted of twelve tournaments around the world that had been introduced since 2011. Successful players were invited to the Superseries Finals, which were held at the end of each year.

Men's doubles
Year	Tournament	Partner	Opponent	Score	Result	Ref.
2017	Japan Open	(Japan) Takuto Inoue	(Indonesia) Marcus Fernaldi Gideon (Indonesia) Kevin Sanjaya Sukamuljo	12–21, 15–21	(silver) Runner-up	

BWF Super Series tournament

=== BWF Grand Prix (1 title, 4 runners-up) ===
The BWF Grand Prix had two levels, the Grand Prix and Grand Prix Gold. It was a series of badminton tournaments sanctioned by the Badminton World Federation (BWF) and played between 2007 and 2017.

Men's doubles
Year	Tournament	Partner	Opponent	Score	Result	Ref.
2014	Russian Open	(Japan) Takuto Inoue	(Japan) Kenta Kazuno (Japan) Kazushi Yamada	21–19, 20–22, 13–21	(silver) Runner-up	
2016	Thailand Open	(Japan) Takuto Inoue	(Indonesia) Berry Angriawan (Indonesia) Rian Agung Saputro	21–17, 14–21, 18–21	(silver) Runner-up	
2017	China Masters	(Japan) Takuto Inoue	(Chinese Taipei) Chen Hung-ling (Chinese Taipei) Wang Chi-lin	14–21, 6–21	(silver) Runner-up	
2017	U.S. Open	(Japan) Takuto Inoue	(Chinese Taipei) Lu Ching-yao (Chinese Taipei) Yang Po-han	15–21, 21–13, 21–13	(gold) Winner	
2017	Dutch Open	(Japan) Takuto Inoue	(Chinese Taipei) Liao Min-chun (Chinese Taipei) Su Cheng-heng	22–24, 18–21	(silver) Runner-up	

BWF Grand Prix Gold tournament
BWF Grand Prix tournament

=== BWF International Challenge/Series (2 titles, 1 runner-up) ===
Men's doubles
Year	Tournament	Partner	Opponent	Score	Result	Ref.
2013	Romanian International	(Japan) Takuto Inoue	(France) Quentin Vincent (France) Sebastien Vincent	21–10, 21–10	(gold) Winner	
2015	Osaka International	(Japan) Takuto Inoue	(Japan) Kenta Kazuno (Japan) Kazushi Yamada	9–21, 19–21	(silver) Runner-up	
2017	Austrian Open	(Japan) Takuto Inoue	(Denmark) Frederik Colberg (Denmark) Rasmus Fladberg	21–19, 21–17	(gold) Winner	

BWF International Challenge tournament
BWF International Series tournament
