= Takuto Inoue =

Japanese badminton player (born 1995)

Personal information
- Born: 26 February 1995 (age 31) Genkai, Saga, Japan
- Height: 1.628 m (5 ft 4 in)
- Weight: 58 kg (128 lb)

Sport
- Country: Japan
- Sport: Badminton
- Handedness: Right
- Retired: 31 March 2024

Men's & mixed doubles
- Highest ranking: 7 (MD with Yuki Kaneko 12 July 2018); 182 (XD with Yuki Fukushima 12 February 2015)
- BWF profile
Medal record
Men's badminton
Representing Japan
Thomas Cup
Silver medal – second place	2018 Bangkok	Men's team
Asian Games
Bronze medal – third place	2018 Jakarta-Palembang	Men's team
Asia Mixed Team Championships
Silver medal – second place	2019 Hong Kong	Mixed team
World Junior Championships
Silver medal – second place	2012 Chiba	Boys' doubles
Silver medal – second place	2012 Chiba	Mixed team
Asian Junior Championships
Gold medal – first place	2012 Gimcheon	Mixed team
Bronze medal – third place	2013 Kota Kinabalu	Mixed team

Takuto Inoue (井上 拓斗, Inoue Takuto; born 26 February 1995) is a Japanese former badminton player from the BIPROGY (formerly Unisys). Primarily competing in men's doubles with Yuki Kaneko, Inoue reached a career-high ranking of world No. 7 on 12 July 2018. Together, they won a BWF Grand Prix Gold title at the 2017 U.S. Open and a BWF World Tour Super 300 title at the 2018 German Open. They also became the first Japanese men's doubles pair since 1982 to reach the final of their home tournament, the 2017 Japan Open Super Series, and were runners-up at the 2018 Indonesia Open Super 1000. In team competitions, Inoue earned silver medals at the 2018 Thomas Cup and the 2019 Asia Mixed Team Championships, and a bronze medal at the 2018 Asian Games men's team event.

== Career ==
=== Junior career ===
During his junior career, Inoue secured two silver medals at the 2012 World Junior Championships in Chiba: one in boys' doubles with Yuki Kaneko, finishing runners-up to Hong Kong's Lee Chun Hei and Ng Ka Long, and another in the mixed team event. In mixed team events, he also earned a gold medal at the 2012 Asian Junior Championships in Gimcheon and a bronze medal at the 2013 Asian Junior Championships in Kota Kinabalu.

=== Senior career ===
Takuto Inoue's senior career began in men's doubles, partnering with Yuki Kaneko. On the International Challenge circuit, Inoue secured his first senior international titles at the 2013 Romanian International, winning both men's singles and men's doubles with Kaneko. They also won the 2017 Austrian Open and were runners-up at the 2015 Osaka International.

In the BWF Grand Prix series, Inoue and Kaneko secured their first Grand Prix Gold title at the 2017 U.S. Open, defeating top-seeded Chinese Taipei pair Lu Ching-yao and Yang Po-han. They were also runners-up at the 2014 Russia Open, 2016 Thailand Open, 2017 China Masters, and 2017 Dutch Open. During the 2016 Thailand Open, they upset the top-seeded Malaysian pair Koo Kien Keat and Tan Boon Heong in the opening round.

On the BWF Super Series circuit, Inoue and Kaneko became the first Japanese men's doubles pair since 1982 to reach the final of their home tournament, the 2017 Japan Open. They defeated 2016 All England Open champions Vladimir Ivanov and Ivan Sozonov in the semifinals before finishing as runners-up to Marcus Fernaldi Gideon and Kevin Sanjaya Sukamuljo.

With the introduction of the BWF World Tour in 2018, Inoue and Kaneko won their first BWF World Tour title at the 2018 German Open Super 300 by defeating Fajar Alfian and Muhammad Rian Ardianto. They were also runners-up at the 2018 Indonesia Open Super 1000, again losing to Marcus Fernaldi Gideon and Kevin Sanjaya Sukamuljo. They achieved a career-high men's doubles ranking of world No. 7 on 12 July 2018.

In the later stages of his career, Inoue formed new men's doubles partnerships. With Kenya Mitsuhashi, he was a runner-up at the 2022 Canada Open and the 2022 Mongolia International. He also won the 2023 Malaysia International with Masayuki Onodera .

In team competitions, Inoue earned silver medals at the 2018 Thomas Cup and the 2019 Asia Mixed Team Championships, and a bronze medal at the 2018 Asian Games men's team event.

Takuto Inoue retired from his playing career on 31 March 2024, after a 11-year tenure with his team, BIPROGY (formerly Unisys).

== Achievements ==
=== World Junior Championships ===
Boys' doubles
Year	Venue	Partner	Opponent	Score	Result	Ref.
2012	Chiba Port Arena; Chiba, Japan	(Japan) Yuki Kaneko	(Hong Kong) Lee Chun Hei (Hong Kong) Ng Ka Long	16–21, 17–21	Silver	

=== BWF World Tour (1 title, 2 runners-up) ===
The BWF World Tour, which was announced on 19 March 2017 and implemented in 2018, is a series of elite badminton tournaments sanctioned by the Badminton World Federation (BWF). The BWF World Tour is divided into levels of World Tour Finals, Super 1000, Super 750, Super 500, Super 300 (part of the HSBC World Tour), and the BWF Tour Super 100.

Men's doubles
Year	Tournament	Level	Partner	Opponent	Score	Result	Ref.
2018	German Open	Super 300	(Japan) Yuki Kaneko	(Indonesia) Fajar Alfian (Indonesia) Muhammad Rian Ardianto	21–16, 21–18	(gold) Winner	
2018	Indonesia Open	Super 1000	(Japan) Yuki Kaneko	(Indonesia) Marcus Fernaldi Gideon (Indonesia) Kevin Sanjaya Sukamuljo	13–21, 16–21	(silver) Runner-up	
2022	Canada Open	Super 100	(Japan) Kenya Mitsuhashi	(Japan) Ayato Endo (Japan) Yuta Takei	15–21, 8–21	(silver) Runner-up	

=== BWF Superseries (1 runner-up) ===
The BWF Superseries, which was launched on 14 December 2006 and implemented in 2007, was a series of elite badminton tournaments, sanctioned by the Badminton World Federation (BWF). BWF Superseries levels were Superseries and Superseries Premier. A season of Superseries consisted of twelve tournaments around the world that had been introduced since 2011. Successful players were invited to the Superseries Finals, which were held at the end of each year.

Men's doubles
Year	Tournament	Partner	Opponent	Score	Result	Ref.
2017	Japan Open	(Japan) Yuki Kaneko	(Indonesia) Marcus Fernaldi Gideon (Indonesia) Kevin Sanjaya Sukamuljo	12–21, 15–21	(silver) Runner-up	

BWF Super Series tournament

=== BWF Grand Prix (1 title, 4 runners-up) ===
The BWF Grand Prix had two levels, the Grand Prix and Grand Prix Gold. It was a series of badminton tournaments sanctioned by the Badminton World Federation (BWF) and played between 2007 and 2017.

Men's doubles
Year	Tournament	Partner	Opponent	Score	Result	Ref.
2014	Russian Open	(Japan) Yuki Kaneko	(Japan) Kenta Kazuno (Japan) Kazushi Yamada	21–19, 20–22, 13–21	(silver) Runner-up	
2016	Thailand Open	(Japan) Yuki Kaneko	(Indonesia) Berry Angriawan (Indonesia) Rian Agung Saputro	21–17, 14–21, 18–21	(silver) Runner-up	
2017	China Masters	(Japan) Yuki Kaneko	(Chinese Taipei) Chen Hung-ling (Chinese Taipei) Wang Chi-lin	14–21, 6–21	(silver) Runner-up	
2017	U.S. Open	(Japan) Yuki Kaneko	(Chinese Taipei) Lu Ching-yao (Chinese Taipei) Yang Po-han	15–21, 21–13, 21–13	(gold) Winner	
2017	Dutch Open	(Japan) Yuki Kaneko	(Chinese Taipei) Liao Min-chun (Chinese Taipei) Su Cheng-heng	22–24, 18–21	(silver) Runner-up	

BWF Grand Prix Gold tournament
BWF Grand Prix tournament

=== BWF International Challenge/Series (4 titles, 3 runners-up) ===
Men's singles
Year	Tournament	Opponent	Score	Result	Ref.
2013	Romanian International	(France) Lucas Corvée	10–21, 21–17, 21–15	(gold) Winner	

Men's doubles
Year	Tournament	Partner	Opponent	Score	Result	Ref.
2013	Romanian International	(Japan) Yuki Kaneko	(France) Quentin Vincent (France) Sébastien Vincent	21–10, 21–10	(gold) Winner	
2015	Osaka International	(Japan) Yuki Kaneko	(Japan) Kenta Kazuno (Japan) Kazushi Yamada	9–21, 19–21	(silver) Runner-up	
2017	Austrian Open	(Japan) Yuki Kaneko	(Denmark) Frederik Colberg (Denmark) Rasmus Fladberg	21–19, 21–17	(gold) Winner	
2022	Réunion Open	(Japan) Kenya Mitsuhashi	(Japan) Shuntaro Mezaki (Japan) Haruya Nishida	21–16, 18–21, 10–21	(silver) Runner-up	
2022	Mongolia International	(Japan) Kenya Mitsuhashi	(Japan) Ayato Endo (Japan) Yuta Takei	14–21, 21–12, 19–21	(silver) Runner-up	
2023	Malaysia International	(Japan) Masayuki Onodera	(Malaysia) Fazriq Razif (Malaysia) Wong Vin Sean	21–16, 18–21, 21–15	(gold) Winner	

BWF International Challenge tournament
BWF International Series tournament
