= 2012 BWF World Junior Championships =

Tournament details
- Dates: October 25, 2012 - November 3, 2012
- Edition: 14th
- Level: International
- Venue: Chiba Port Arena
- Location: Chiba, Japan

The 2012 BWF World Junior Championships were held in Chiba, Japan from October 25 to November 3, 2012.

== Medalists ==
Event	Gold	Silver	Bronze
Teams	China; Guo Kai; Li Junhui; Liu Yuchen; Pei Tianyi; Wang Yilu; Xue Song; Zhang Ningyi; Zhou Yujie; Chen Qingchen; Huang Dongping; Huang Yaqiong; Qin Jinjing; Sun Yu; Yu Xiaohan; Zheng Yu	Japan; Takuto Inoue; Yuki Kaneko; Yugo Kobayashi; Akira Koga; Keiichiro Matsui; Koshun Miura; Kento Momota; Kenta Nishimoto; Saki Hayata; Chisato Hoshi; Mayu Nakamura; Aya Ohori; Nozomi Okuhara; Ayako Sakuramoto; Akane Watanabe; Akane Yamaguchi	South Korea; Choi Sol-gyu; Heo Kwang-hee; Jeon Hyeok-jin; Jung Jae-wook; Kim Jae-hwan; Kim Jung-ho; Park Se-woong; Seo Seung-jae; Chae Yoo-jung; Kim Hyo-min; Kim Ji-won; Lee Jang-mi; Lee Min-ji; Lee So-hee; Ryu Young-seo; Shin Seung-chan
Boys singles	(Japan) Kento Momota	(China) Xue Song	(South Korea) Heo Kwang-hee
Boys singles	(Japan) Kento Momota	(China) Xue Song	(Chinese Taipei) Hsu Jui-ting
Girls singles	(Japan) Nozomi Okuhara	(Japan) Akane Yamaguchi	(Japan) Aya Ohori
Girls singles	(Japan) Nozomi Okuhara	(Japan) Akane Yamaguchi	(China) Sun Yu
Boys doubles	(Hong Kong) Lee Chun Hei (Hong Kong) Ng Ka Long	(Japan) Takuto Inoue (Japan) Yuki Kaneko	(China) Liu Yuchen (China) Wang Yilu
Boys doubles	(Hong Kong) Lee Chun Hei (Hong Kong) Ng Ka Long	(Japan) Takuto Inoue (Japan) Yuki Kaneko	(China) Pei Tianyi (China) Zhang Ningyi
Girls doubles	(South Korea) Lee So-hee (South Korea) Shin Seung-chan	(China) Huang Yaqiong (China) Yu Xiaohan	(Malaysia) Chow Mei Kuan (Malaysia) Lee Meng Yean
Girls doubles	(South Korea) Lee So-hee (South Korea) Shin Seung-chan	(China) Huang Yaqiong (China) Yu Xiaohan	(South Korea) Kim Hyo-min (South Korea) Lee Min-ji
Mixed doubles	(Indonesia) Edi Subaktiar (Indonesia) Melati Daeva Oktaviani	(Indonesia) Alfian Eko Prasetya (Indonesia) Shella Devi Aulia	(China) Wang Yilu (China) Huang Yaqiong
Mixed doubles	(Indonesia) Edi Subaktiar (Indonesia) Melati Daeva Oktaviani	(Indonesia) Alfian Eko Prasetya (Indonesia) Shella Devi Aulia	(China) Liu Yuchen (China) Chen Qingchen

== Medal table ==
Rank	Nation	Gold	Silver	Bronze	Total
1	Japan (JPN)	2	3	1	6
2	China (CHN)	1	2	5	8
3	Indonesia (INA)	1	1	0	2
4	South Korea (KOR)	1	0	3	4
5	Hong Kong (HKG)	1	0	0	1
6	Chinese Taipei (TPE)	0	0	1	1
6	Malaysia (MAS)	0	0	1	1
Totals (7 entries)		6	6	11	23
