= Ng Ka Long =

Hong Kong badminton player (born 1994)

Angus Ng Ka Long 伍家朗
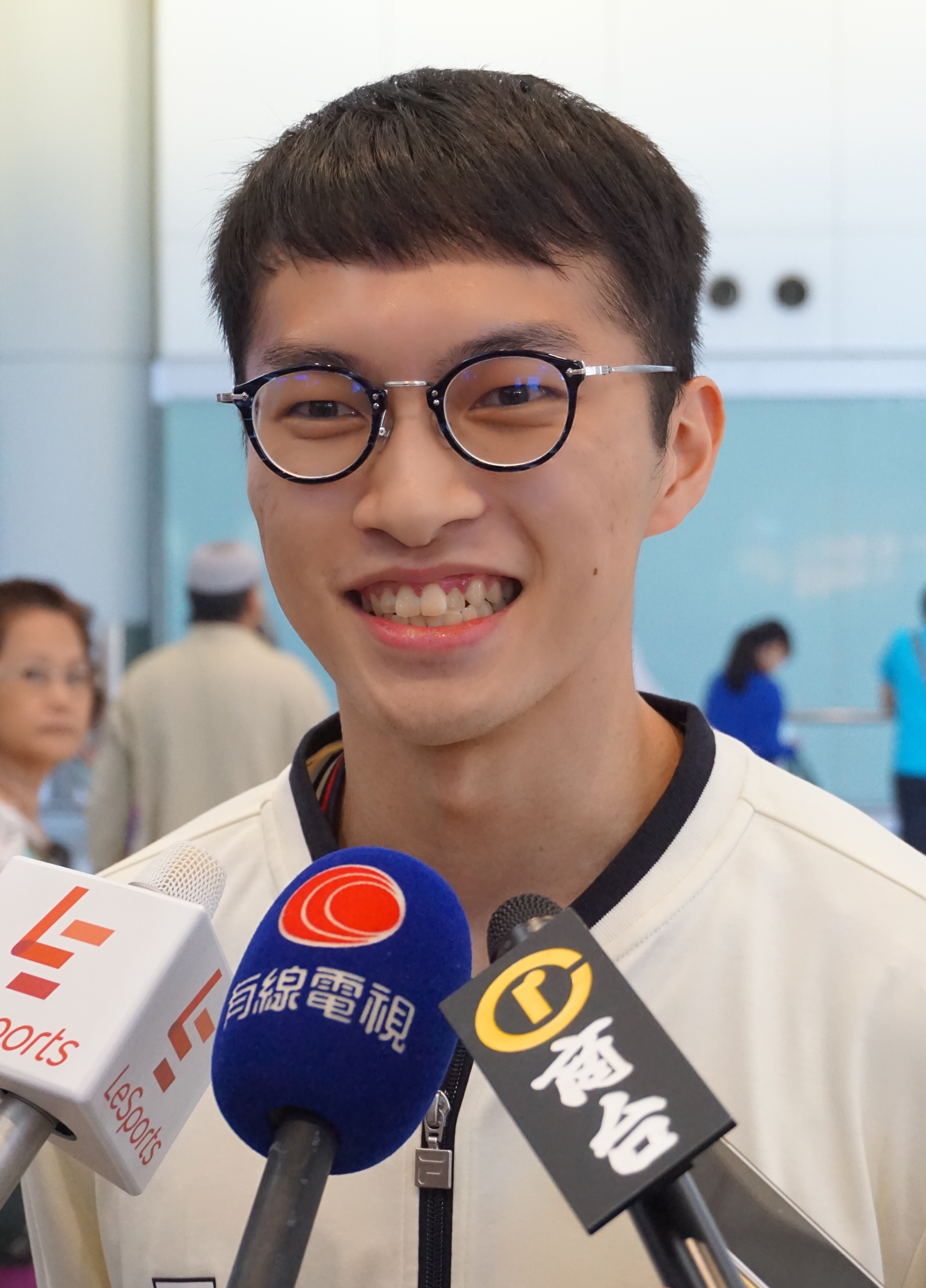
- Ng in 2016

Personal information
- Born: 24 June 1994 (age 32) Hong Kong
- Height: 1.81 m (5 ft 11 in)
- Weight: 70 kg (154 lb)

Sport
- Country: Hong Kong
- Sport: Badminton
- Handedness: Right
- Coached by: Wong Choong Hann

Men's singles
- Career record: 338 wins, 223 losses
- Highest ranking: 6 (11 November 2017)
- Current ranking: 27 (27 October 2026)
- BWF profile
Medal record
Men's badminton
Representing Hong Kong
Asia Mixed Team Championships
Bronze medal – third place	2019 Hong Kong	Mixed team
East Asian Games
Silver medal – second place	2013 Tianjin	Men's team
Bronze medal – third place	2013 Tianjin	Men's doubles
World Junior Championships
Gold medal – first place	2012 Chiba	Boys' doubles
Bronze medal – third place	2010 Guadaljara	Boys' doubles
Asian Junior Championships
Bronze medal – third place	2008 Kuala Lumpur	Mixed team
Bronze medal – third place	2012 Gimcheon	Boys' doubles

Ng Ka Long
- Traditional Chinese: 伍家朗
- Simplified Chinese: 伍家朗
Transcriptions
Standard Mandarin
- Hanyu Pinyin: Wǔ Jiālǎng
- Wade–Giles: Wu Chia Lang
Yue: Cantonese
- Jyutping: Ng5 Gaa1 Long5

Angus Ng Ka Long (born 24 June 1994) is a Hong Kong badminton player. He has a career-high ranking of 6th in the men's singles discipline. He won the 2016 Hong Kong Super Series, the 2020 Thailand Masters and the 2023 German Open.

== Early life and education ==
Ng trained at the Hong Kong Sports Institute. He credits his father as the main influence on his career. His grandmother from his mother's side is Chinese-Indonesian.

== Career ==
At the 2010 BWF World Junior Championships, Guadalajara, he won a bronze medal in the men's doubles category. He won gold in the men's doubles in 2012 in Chiba Prefecture. He won bronze in the 2012 Asian Junior Championships in men's doubles.

In 2013, Ng participated in the 2013 BWF World Championships in Guangzhou, China, was the runner-up at the Vietnam International Challenge in men's singles, and competed in the 2013 East Asian Games in Tianjin for Hong Kong, winning a silver medal in the men's team and bronze in the men's doubles.

In 2014, Ng won the China International Challenge, Osaka International Challenge and Irish Open. He was the runner-up at the Canadian Grand Prix and the Swiss International tournaments.

In 2015, Ng won the men's singles title at the Austrian Open. He later won his first Grand Prix title at the Bitburger Open. He also came second at the Canadian Grand Prix and reached the semifinals at the Hong Kong Super Series, having beaten top 10 players like Lin Dan and Chou Tien Chen before losing to Lee Chong Wei.

In 2016, Ng made history by becoming the first home player to win the men's singles title at the Hong Kong Open, beating India's Sameer Verma in the final. He also competed at the 2016 Summer Olympics.

After a damp 2022, Ng found his form in 2023 by reaching the final of the Thailand Masters and winning the German Open. At the 2023 Badminton Asia Championships, he defeated the defending champion Lee Zii Jia in straight games in the first round, which was his second consecutive victory over the former All England champion.

== Achievements ==
=== East Asian Games ===
Men's doubles
Year	Venue	Partner	Opponent	Score	Result
2013	Binhai New Area Dagang Gymnasium; Tianjin, China	(Hong Kong) Lee Chun Hei	(Chinese Taipei) Lee Sheng-mu (Chinese Taipei) Tsai Chia-hsin	11–21, 19–21	Bronze

=== BWF World Junior Championships ===
Boys' doubles
Year	Venue	Partner	Opponent	Score	Result
2010	Domo del Code Jalisco; Guadalajara, Mexico	(Hong Kong) Lee Chun Hei	(Malaysia) Nelson Heg Wei Keat (Malaysia) Teo Ee Yi	21–17, 15–21, 11–21	Bronze
2012	Chiba Port Arena; Chiba, Japan	(Hong Kong) Lee Chun Hei	(Japan) Takuto Inoue (Japan) Yuki Kaneko	21–16, 21–17	Gold

=== Asian Junior Championships ===
Boys' doubles
Year	Venue	Partner	Opponent	Score	Result
2012	Gimcheon Indoor Stadium; Gimcheon, South Korea	(Hong Kong) Lee Chun Hei	(Indonesia) Arya Maulana Aldiartama (Indonesia) Edi Subaktiar	21–15, 24–26, 15–21	Bronze

=== BWF World Tour (3 titles, 7 runners-up) ===
The BWF World Tour, which was announced on 19 March 2017 and implemented in 2018, is a series of elite badminton tournaments sanctioned by the Badminton World Federation (BWF). The BWF World Tour is divided into levels of World Tour Finals, Super 1000, Super 750, Super 500, Super 300, and the BWF Tour Super 100.

Men's singles
Year	Tournament	Level	Opponent	Score	Result
2018	German Open	Super 300	(Chinese Taipei) Chou Tien-chen	19–21, 21–18, 18–21	(silver) Runner-up
2019	New Zealand Open	Super 300	(Indonesia) Jonatan Christie	12–21, 13–21	(silver) Runner-up
2019	Thailand Open	Super 500	(Chinese Taipei) Chou Tien-chen	14–21, 21–11, 21–23	(silver) Runner-up
2020	Thailand Masters	Super 300	(Japan) Kenta Nishimoto	16–21, 21–13, 21–12	(gold) Winner
2020 (I)	Thailand Open	Super 1000	(Denmark) Viktor Axelsen	14–21, 14–21	(silver) Runner-up
2022	Malaysia Masters	Super 500	(Indonesia) Chico Aura Dwi Wardoyo	20–22, 15–21	(silver) Runner-up
2023	Thailand Masters	Super 300	(Chinese Taipei) Lin Chun-yi	17–21, 14–21	(silver) Runner-up
2023	German Open	Super 300	(China) Li Shifeng	20–22, 21–18, 21–18	(gold) Winner
2024	Thailand Open	Super 500	(Malaysia) Lee Zii Jia	11–21, 10–21	(silver) Runner-up
2024	Macau Open	Super 300	(Singapore) Jason Teh	21–19, 21–17	(gold) Winner

=== BWF Superseries (1 title) ===
The BWF Superseries, which was launched on 14 December 2006 and implemented in 2007, was a series of elite badminton tournaments, sanctioned by the Badminton World Federation (BWF). BWF Superseries levels were Superseries and Superseries Premier. A season of Superseries consisted of twelve tournaments around the world that had been introduced since 2011. Successful players were invited to the Superseries Finals, which were held at the end of each year.

Men's singles
Year	Tournament	Opponent	Score	Result
2016	Hong Kong Open	(India) Sameer Verma	21–14, 10–21, 21–11	(gold) Winner

BWF Super Series tournament

=== BWF Grand Prix (2 titles, 2 runners-up) ===
The BWF Grand Prix had two levels, the BWF Grand Prix and Grand Prix Gold. It was a series of badminton tournaments sanctioned by the Badminton World Federation (BWF) which was held from 2007 to 2017.

Men’s singles
Year	Tournament	Opponent	Score	Result
2014	Canada Open	(South Korea) Lee Hyun-il	16–21, 14–21	(silver) Runner-up
2015	Canada Open	(Malaysia) Lee Chong Wei	17–21, 13–21	(silver) Runner-up
2015	Bitburger Open	(Hong Kong) Wong Wing Ki	21–12, 21–13	(gold) Winner
2017	Malaysia Masters	(South Korea) Lee Hyun-il	14–21, 21–15, 10–9 retired	(gold) Winner

BWF Grand Prix Gold tournament
BWF Grand Prix tournament

=== BWF International Challenge/Series (4 titles, 2 runners-up) ===
Men's singles
Year	Tournament	Opponent	Score	Result
2013	Vietnam International	(Malaysia) Chan Kwong Beng	11–21, 20–22	(silver) Runner-up
2014	China International	(Hong Kong) Wei Nan	21–16, 21–15	(gold) Winner
2014	Osaka International	(Japan) Riichi Takeshita	21–13, 21–12	(gold) Winner
2014	Swiss International	(Indonesia) Jonatan Christie	11–9, 11–9, 6–11, 9–11, 10–11	(silver) Runner-up
2014	Irish Open	(Chinese Taipei) Wang Tzu-wei	21–18, 21–13	(gold) Winner
2015	Austrian International	(Malaysia) Iskandar Zulkarnain Zainuddin	14–21, 21–18, 21–19	(gold) Winner

BWF International Challenge tournament
