= Lee Chun Hei =

Hong Kong badminton player (born 1994)

Lee Chun Hei 李晉熙
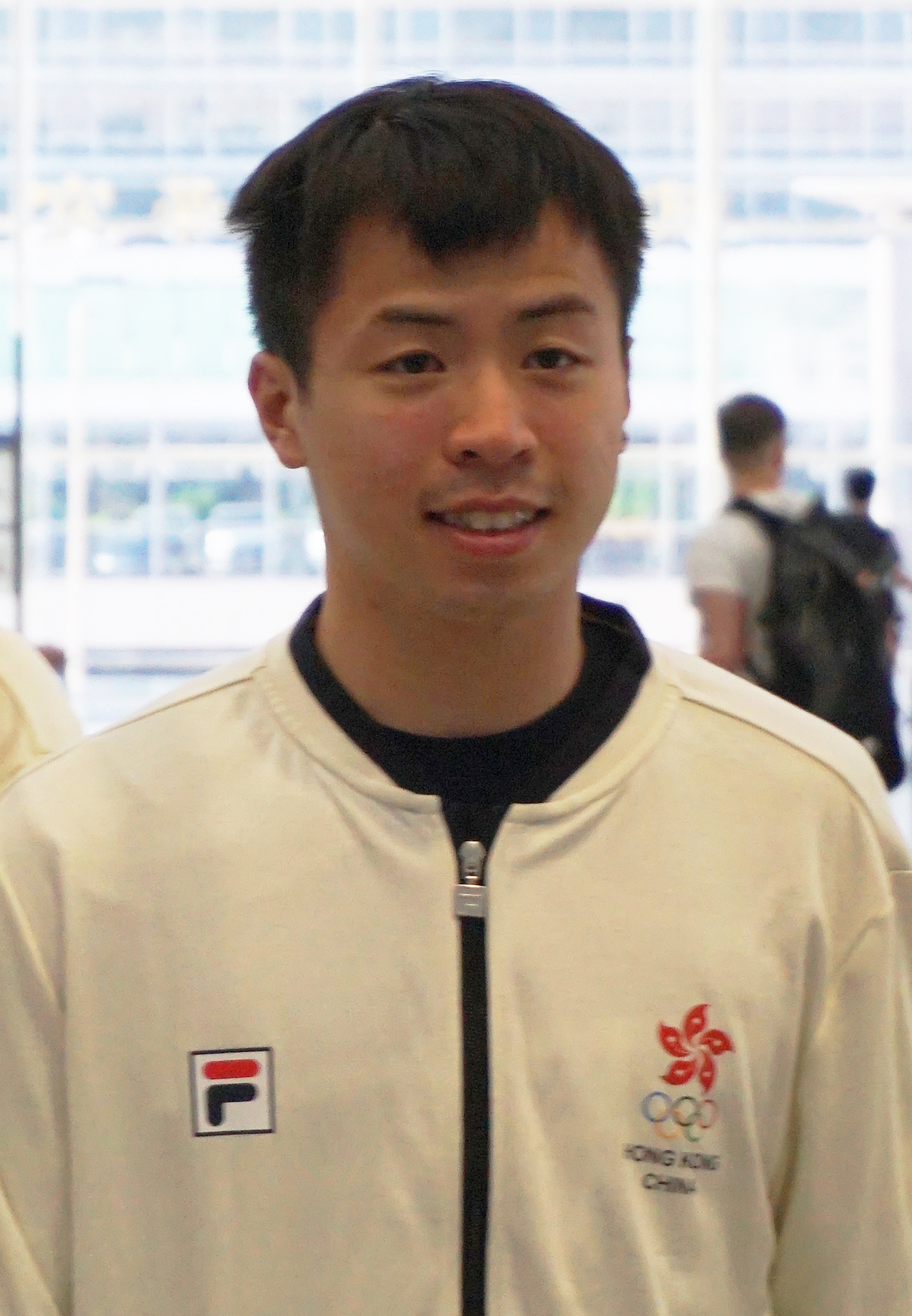
- Lee in 2016

Personal information
- Born: 25 January 1994 (age 32) Hong Kong
- Height: 1.70 m (5 ft 7 in)
- Weight: 72 kg (159 lb)

Sport
- Country: Hong Kong
- Sport: Badminton

Men's & mixed doubles
- Highest ranking: 26 (MD with Law Cheuk Him 15 June 2017); 6 (XD with Chau Hoi Wah 19 June 2014)
- BWF profile
Medal record
Men's badminton
Representing Hong Kong
World Championships
Bronze medal – third place	2017 Glasgow	Mixed doubles
Asia Championships
Gold medal – first place	2014 Gimcheon	Mixed doubles
Silver medal – second place	2015 Wuhan	Mixed doubles
Bronze medal – third place	2013 Taipei	Mixed doubles
Bronze medal – third place	2017 Wuhan	Mixed doubles
East Asian Games
Silver medal – second place	2013 Tianjin	Men's team
Silver medal – second place	2013 Tianjin	Mixed doubles
Bronze medal – third place	2013 Tianjin	Men's doubles
World Junior Championships
Gold medal – first place	2012 Chiba	Boys' doubles
Bronze medal – third place	2010 Guadalajara	Boys' doubles
Asian Junior Championships
Bronze medal – third place	2008 Kuala Lumpur	Mixed team
Bronze medal – third place	2012 Gimcheon	Boys' doubles

Reginald Lee Chun Hei (Chinese: 李晉熙; Jyutping: lei5 zeon3 hei1, born 25 January 1994) is a Hong Kong badminton player. He is a former Asian Champion and World Championships bronze medalist in the mixed doubles category partnered with Chau Hoi Wah.

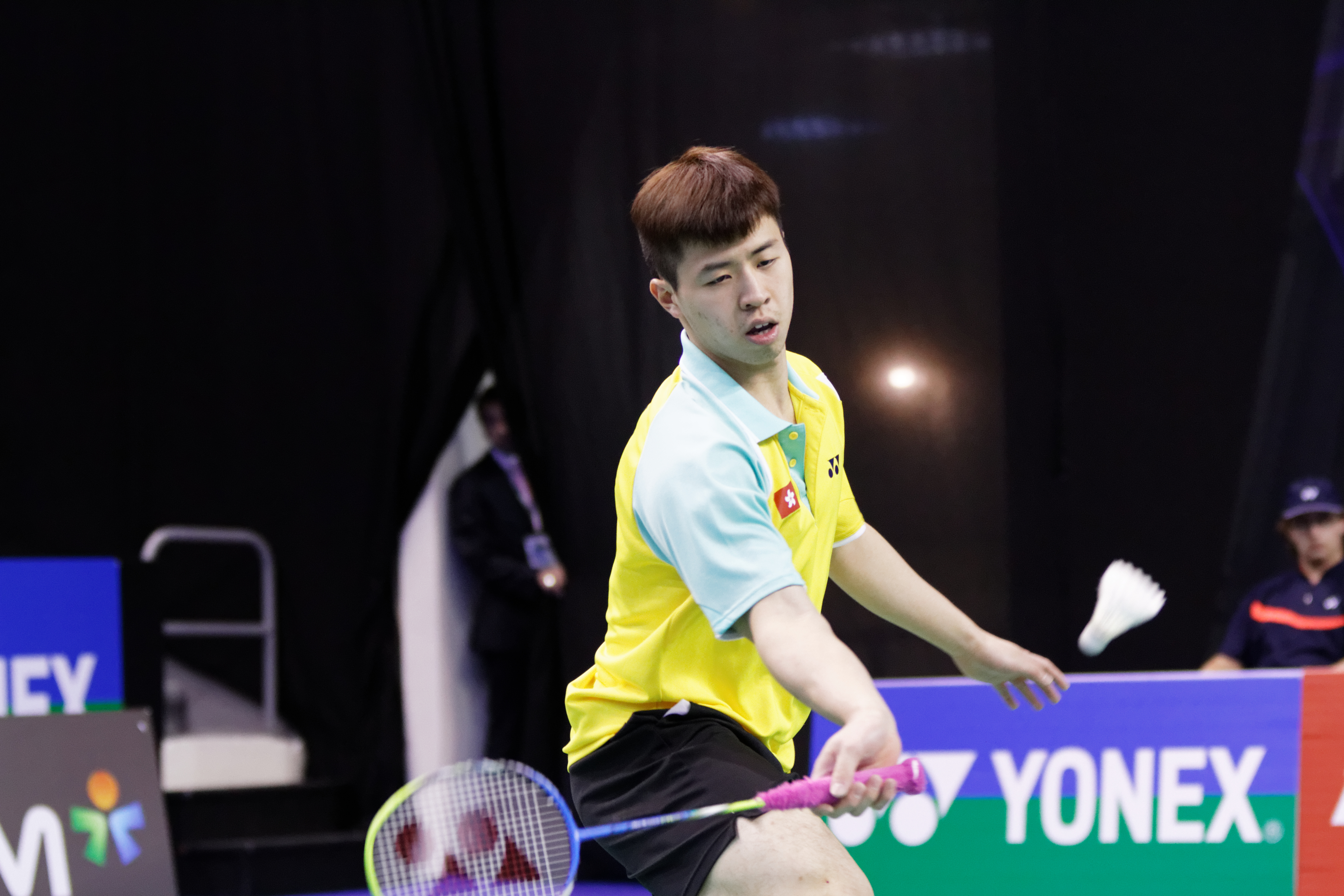
Reginald Lee Chun Hei at 2013 French Super Series

== Career ==
Reginald Lee Chun Hei participated in the 2010 BWF World Junior Championships and placed third. He placed fifth a year later. 2012 he started at the Asian Badminton Championships and represented his country in the qualification for the Thomas Cup. He is a former Asian Champion and bronze medalist in the World Championships in the mixed doubles category partnered with Chau Hoi Wah.

== Achievements ==
=== BWF World Championships ===
Mixed doubles
Year	Venue	Partner	Opponent	Score	Result
2017	Emirates Arena, Glasgow, Scotland	(Hong Kong) Chau Hoi Wah	(Indonesia) Tontowi Ahmad (Indonesia) Liliyana Natsir	16–21, 13–21	Bronze

=== Asian Championships ===
Mixed doubles
Year	Venue	Partner	Opponent	Score	Result
2013	Taipei Arena; Taipei, Taiwan	(Hong Kong) Chau Hoi Wah	(China) Zhang Nan (China) Zhao Yunlei	16–21, 11–21	Bronze
2014	Gimcheon Indoor Stadium; Gimcheon, South Korea	(Hong Kong) Chau Hoi Wah	(South Korea) Shin Baek-cheol (South Korea) Jang Ye-na	13–21, 21–15, 21–15	Gold
2015	Wuhan Sports Center Gymnasium; Wuhan, China	(Hong Kong) Chau Hoi Wah	(Indonesia) Tontowi Ahmad (Indonesia) Liliyana Natsir	16–21, 15–21	Silver
2017	Wuhan Sports Center Gymnasium; Wuhan, China	(Hong Kong) Chau Hoi Wah	(China) Lu Kai (China) Huang Yaqiong	10–21, 19–21	Bronze

=== East Asian Games ===
Men's doubles
Year	Venue	Partner	Opponent	Score	Result
2013	Binhai New Area Dagang Gymnasium; Tianjin, China	(Hong Kong) Ng Ka Long	(Chinese Taipei) Lee Sheng-mu (Chinese Taipei) Tsai Chia-hsin	11–21, 19–21	Bronze

Mixed doubles
Year	Venue	Partner	Opponent	Score	Result
2013	Binhai New Area Dagang Gymnasium; Tianjin, China	(Hong Kong) Chau Hoi Wah	(China) Xu Chen (China) Ma Jin	21–17, 13–21, 13–21	Silver

=== BWF World Junior Championships ===
Boys' doubles
Year	Venue	Partner	Opponent	Score	Result
2010	Domo del Code Jalisco; Guadalajara, Mexico	(Hong Kong) Ng Ka Long	(Malaysia) Nelson Heg (Malaysia) Teo Ee Yi	21–17, 15–21, 11–21	Bronze
2012	Chiba Port Arena; Chiba, Japan	(Hong Kong) Ng Ka Long	(Japan) Takuto Inoue (Japan) Yuki Kaneko	21–16, 21–17	Gold

=== Asian Junior Championships ===
Boys' doubles
Year	Venue	Partner	Opponent	Score	Result
2012	Gimcheon Indoor Stadium; Gimcheon, South Korea	(Hong Kong) Ng Ka Long	(Indonesia) Arya Maulana Aldiartama (Indonesia) Edi Subaktiar	21–15, 24–26, 15–21	Bronze

=== BWF World Tour (1 title, 1 runner-up) ===
The BWF World Tour, which was announced on 19 March 2017 and implemented in 2018, is a series of elite badminton tournaments sanctioned by the Badminton World Federation (BWF). The BWF World Tour is divided into levels of World Tour Finals, Super 1000, Super 750, Super 500, Super 300, and the BWF Tour Super 100.

Mixed doubles
Year	Tournament	Level	Partner	Opponent	Score	Result
2018	Macau Open	Super 300	(Hong Kong) Chau Hoi Wah	(Hong Kong) Tang Chun Man (Hong Kong) Tse Ying Suet	14–21, 15–21	(silver) Runner-up
2022	Taipei Open	Super 300	(Hong Kong) Ng Tsz Yau	(Thailand) Ruttanapak Oupthong (Thailand) Chasinee Korepap	21–8, 21–9	(gold) Winner

=== BWF Superseries (1 title) ===
The BWF Superseries, which was launched on 14 December 2006 and implemented in 2007, was a series of elite badminton tournaments, sanctioned by the Badminton World Federation (BWF). BWF Superseries levels were Superseries and Superseries Premier. A season of Superseries consisted of twelve tournaments around the world that had been introduced since 2011. Successful players were invited to the Superseries Finals, which were held at the end of each year.

Mixed doubles
Year	Tournament	Partner	Opponent	Score	Result
2015	Australian Open	(Hong Kong) Chau Hoi Wah	(China) Liu Cheng (China) Bao Yixin	21–19, 19–21, 21–15	(gold) Winner

BWF Super Series Finals tournament
BWF Super Series Premier tournament
BWF Super Series tournament

=== BWF Grand Prix (3 titles, 2 runners-up) ===
The BWF Grand Prix had two levels, the Grand Prix and Grand Prix Gold. It was a series of badminton tournaments sanctioned by the Badminton World Federation (BWF) and played between 2007 and 2017.

Mixed doubles
Year	Tournament	Partner	Opponent	Score	Result
2012	Chinese Taipei Open	(Hong Kong) Chau Hoi Wah	(Indonesia) Muhammad Rijal (Indonesia) Debby Susanto	14–21, 14–21	(silver) Runner-up
2013	U.S. Open	(Hong Kong) Chau Hoi Wah	(China) Wang Yilyu (China) Huang Yaqiong	21–8, 21–14	(gold) Winner
2013	Canada Open	(Hong Kong) Chau Hoi Wah	(Netherlands) Jorrit de Ruiter (Netherlands) Samantha Barning	21–13, 21–10	(gold) Winner
2015	U.S. Open	(Hong Kong) Chau Hoi Wah	(China) Huang Kaixiang (China) Huang Dongping	15–21, 14–21	(silver) Runner-up
2015	Canada Open	(Hong Kong) Chau Hoi Wah	(Indonesia) Andrei Adistia (Indonesia) Vita Marissa	21–16, 21–18	(gold) Winner

BWF Grand Prix Gold tournament
BWF Grand Prix tournament

=== BWF International Challenge/Series (2 titles, 4 runners-up) ===
Men's doubles
Year	Tournament	Partner	Opponent	Score	Result
2022	Slovak Open	(Hong Kong) Law Cheuk Him	(Malaysia) Boon Xin Yuan (Malaysia) Wong Tien Ci	18–21, 21–14, 19–21	(silver) Runner-up

Mixed doubles
Year	Tournament	Partner	Opponent	Score	Result
2013	Austrian International	(Hong Kong) Chau Hoi Wah	(Hong Kong) Chan Yun Lung (Hong Kong) Tse Ying Suet	21–15, 16–21, 16–21	(silver) Runner-up
2013	Vietnam International	(Hong Kong) Chau Hoi Wah	(Hong Kong) Chan Yun Lung (Hong Kong) Tse Ying Suet	4–21, 21–17, 17–21	(silver) Runner-up
2021	Bahrain International Series	(Hong Kong) Ng Tsz Yau	(Hong Kong) Law Cheuk Him (Hong Kong) Yeung Nga Ting	23–21, 21–12	(gold) Winner
2022	Dutch International	(Hong Kong) Ng Tsz Yau	(Denmark) Jesper Toft (Denmark) Clara Graversen	21–9, 21–14	(gold) Winner
2022	Denmark Masters	(Hong Kong) Ng Tsz Yau	(Indonesia) Dejan Ferdinansyah (Indonesia) Gloria Emanuelle Widjaja	16–21, 19–21	(silver) Runner-up

BWF International Challenge tournament
BWF International Series tournament
BWF Future Series tournament
