= 2013 Asian Junior Badminton Championships – Teams event =

Badminton championship in Likas, Sabah, Malaysia

Teams event at the 2013 Asian Junior Badminton Championships
- Venue: Likas Indoor Stadium
- Location: Likas, Sabah, Malaysia
- Dates: 7–10 July 2013

The team tournament at the 2013 Asian Junior Badminton Championships took place from 7 to 10 July 2013 at Likas Indoor Stadium in Likas, Sabah, Malaysia. A total of 16 countries competed in this event.

== Group stage ==
=== Group A ===
Pos	Team	Pld	W	L	MF	MA	MD	GF	GA	GD	PF	PA	PD	Pts	Qualification	Malaysia	Indonesia	Singapore	Kazakhstan
1	Malaysia (H)	3	3	0	12	3	+9	25	9	+16	641	499	+142	3	Advance to knockout stage	—	3–2	4–1	5–0
2	Indonesia	3	2	1	12	3	+9	27	7	+20	682	435	+247	2	Advance to knockout stage		—	5–0	5–0
3	Singapore	3	1	2	6	9	−3	13	19	−6	548	536	+12	1				—	5–0
4	Kazakhstan	3	0	3	0	15	−15	0	30	−30	229	630	−401	0					—

Source: BadmintonCN
(H) Host

==== Malaysia vs Singapore ====
Malaysia
4
Likas Indoor Stadium, Court 1
7 July 2013, 09:00 UTC+8

Singapore
1

			1	2	3
1	(Malaysia) (Singapore)	Chua Khek Wei / Yap Cheng Wen; Terry Hee / Elaine Chua	21; 18	21; 18
2	(Malaysia) (Singapore)	Soong Joo Ven; Bernard Ong	21; 14	21; 15
3	(Malaysia) (Singapore)	Ho Yen Mei; Liang Xiaoyu	7; 21	21; 16	12; 21
4	(Malaysia) (Singapore)	Darren Isaac Devadass / Ong Yew Sin; Terry Hee / Tan Zi Jian	21; 14	21; 19
5	(Malaysia) (Singapore)	Joyce Choong / Goh Yea Ching; Elaine Chua / Yeo Jia Min	21; 7	21; 17

==== Indonesia vs Kazakhstan ====
Indonesia
5
Likas Indoor Stadium, Court 4
7 July 2013, 09:30 UTC+8

Kazakhstan
0

			1	2	3
1	(Indonesia) (Kazakhstan)	Rafiddias Akhdan Nugroho / Setyana Mapasa; Dmitriy Malikov / Akbayan Kassenova	21; 1	21; 4
2	(Indonesia) (Kazakhstan)	Muhammad Bayu Pangisthu; Khaitmurat Kulmatov	21; 11	21; 6
3	(Indonesia) (Kazakhstan)	Ruselli Hartawan; Nargiza Ismailova	21; 7	21; 6
4	(Indonesia) (Kazakhstan)	Fajar Alfian / Rian Swastedian; Khaitmurat Kulmatov / Denis Serebryakov	21; 5	21; 7
5	(Indonesia) (Kazakhstan)	Uswatun Khasanah / Rosyita Eka Putri Sari; Nargiza Ismailova / Akbayan Kassenova	21; 0	21; 7

==== Indonesia vs Singapore ====
Indonesia
5
Likas Indoor Stadium, Court 1
7 July 2013, 17:00 UTC+8

Singapore
0

			1	2	3
1	(Indonesia) (Singapore)	Fajar Alfian / Surya Della Augustia; Terry Hee / Elaine Chua	21; 17	21; 14
2	(Indonesia) (Singapore)	Fikri Ihsandi Hadmadi; Bernard Ong	25; 23	21; 9
3	(Indonesia) (Singapore)	Hanna Ramadini; Liang Xiaoyu	19; 21	21; 11	21; 12
4	(Indonesia) (Singapore)	Arya Maulana Aldiartama / Kevin Sanjaya Sukamuljo; Terry Hee / Tan Zi Jian	21; 13	21; 11
5	(Indonesia) (Singapore)	Setyana Mapasa / Rosyita Eka Putri Sari; Elaine Chua / Yeo Jia Min	21; 10	21; 17

==== Malaysia vs Kazakhstan ====
Malaysia
5
Likas Indoor Stadium, Court 3
7 July 2013, 17:00 UTC+8

Kazakhstan
0

			1	2	3
1	(Malaysia) (Kazakhstan)	Kisona Selvaduray; Akbayan Kassenova	21; 2	21; 6
2	(Malaysia) (Kazakhstan)	Cheam June Wei; Khaitmurat Kulmatov	21; 16	21; 15
3	(Malaysia) (Kazakhstan)	Goh Yea Ching / Peck Yen Wei; Nargiza Ismailova / Akbayan Kassenova	21; 7	21; 5
4	(Malaysia) (Kazakhstan)	Chua Khek Wei / Woon Man Chun; Dmitriy Malikov / Denis Serebryakov	21; 6	21; 4
5	(Malaysia) (Kazakhstan)	Darren Isaac Devadass / Joyce Choong; Khaitmurat Kulmatov / Nargiza Ismailova	21; 9	21; 10

==== Singapore vs Kazakhstan ====
Singapore
5
Likas Indoor Stadium, Court 2
8 July 2013, 09:00 UTC+8

Kazakhstan
0

			1	2	3
1	(Singapore) (Kazakhstan)	Terry Hee / Elaine Chua; Dmitriy Malikov / Akbayan Kassenova	21; 3	21; 8
2	(Singapore) (Kazakhstan)	Daryl Ng; Khaitmurat Kulmatov	21; 15	21; 17
3	(Singapore) (Kazakhstan)	Yeo Jia Min; Nargiza Ismailova	21; 5	21; 6
4	(Singapore) (Kazakhstan)	Daryl Ng / Tan Zi Jian; Khaitmurat Kulmatov / Denis Serebryakov	21; 9	21; 10
5	(Singapore) (Kazakhstan)	Fiona Seah / Grace Chua; Nargiza Ismailova / Akbayan Kassenova	21; 13	21; 9

==== Indonesia vs Malaysia ====
Indonesia
2
Likas Indoor Stadium, Court 1
8 July 2013, 17:00 UTC+8

Malaysia
3

			1	2	3
1	(Indonesia) (Malaysia)	Kevin Sanjaya Sukamuljo / Masita Mahmudin; Chua Khek Wei / Yap Cheng Wen	21; 14	21; 14
2	(Indonesia) (Malaysia)	Fikri Ihsandi Hadmadi; Soong Joo Ven	14; 21	21; 15	11; 21
3	(Indonesia) (Malaysia)	Arya Maulana Aldiartama / Kevin Sanjaya Sukamuljo; Darren Isaac Devadass / Ong Yew Sin	21; 15	21; 12
4	(Indonesia) (Malaysia)	Hanna Ramadini; Ho Yen Mei	21; 13	13; 21	17; 21
5	(Indonesia) (Malaysia)	Setyana Mapasa / Rosyita Eka Putri Sari; Joyce Choong / Yap Cheng Wen	19; 21	21; 14	18; 21

=== Group B ===
Pos	Team	Pld	W	L	MF	MA	MD	GF	GA	GD	PF	PA	PD	Pts	Qualification	People's Republic of China	Chinese Taipei for Olympic games	Vietnam	Nepal
1	China	3	3	0	13	2	+11	27	5	+22	636	376	+260	3	Advance to knockout stage	—	3–2	5–0	5–0
2	Chinese Taipei	3	2	1	12	3	+9	25	9	+16	648	459	+189	2	Advance to knockout stage		—	5–0	5–0
3	Vietnam	3	1	2	5	10	−5	12	21	−9	515	566	−51	1				—	5–0
4	Nepal	3	0	3	0	15	−15	1	30	−29	251	649	−398	0					—

Source: BadmintonCN

==== China vs Nepal ====
China
5
Likas Indoor Stadium, Court 3
7 July 2013, 09:00 UTC+8

Nepal
0

			1	2	3
1	(China) (Nepal)	Liu Yuchen / Huang Dongping; Bijeet Thapa Magar / Shreya Pradhan	21; 5	21; 9
2	(China) (Nepal)	Zhao Junpeng; Dipesh Dhami	21; 7	21; 10
3	(China) (Nepal)	Qin Jinjing; Sichhya Shrestha	21; 3	21; 3
4	(China) (Nepal)	Huang Kaixiang / Zheng Siwei; Dipesh Dhami / Bijeet Thapa Magar	21; 9	21; 7
5	(China) (Nepal)	He Jiaxin / Zhu Maici; Shreya Pradhan / Sichhya Shrestha	21; 3	21; 7

==== Chinese Taipei vs Vietnam ====
Chinese Taipei
5
Likas Indoor Stadium, Court 5
7 July 2013, 09:30 UTC+8

Vietnam
0

			1	2	3
1	(Chinese Taipei) (Vietnam)	Wang Chi-lin / Chang Ching-hui; Ngô Xuân Tú / Trần Thị Linh Giang	19; 21	21; 17	21; 6
2	(Chinese Taipei) (Vietnam)	Wang Tzu-wei; Phạm Cao Cường	21; 13	21; 16
3	(Chinese Taipei) (Vietnam)	Lee Chia-hsin; Nguyễn Thùy Linh	21; 12	10; 21	21; 8
4	(Chinese Taipei) (Vietnam)	Tien Tzu-chieh / Wang Chi-lin; Đỗ Tuấn Đức / Phạm Hồng Nam	21; 13	21; 14
5	(Chinese Taipei) (Vietnam)	Chang Ching-hui / Chang Hsin-tien; Nguyễn Thùy Linh / Trần Thị Linh Giang	21; 14	21; 17

==== China vs Vietnam ====
China
5
Likas Indoor Stadium, Court 2
7 July 2013, 17:00 UTC+8

Vietnam
0

			1	2	3
1	(China) (Vietnam)	Huang Kaixiang / Chen Qingchen; Dương Quốc Khánh / Trần Thị Linh Giang	21; 7	21; 13
2	(China) (Vietnam)	Lin Guipu; Võ Bảo Thiên	21; 15	21; 12
3	(China) (Vietnam)	Qin Jinjing; Nguyễn Thùy Linh	21; 12	21; 15
4	(China) (Vietnam)	Li Junhui / Liu Yuchen; Đỗ Tuấn Đức / Phạm Hồng Nam	21; 14	21; 10
5	(China) (Vietnam)	Huang Dongping / Jia Yifan; Nguyễn Thùy Linh / Trần Thị Linh Giang	21; 9	21; 7

==== Chinese Taipei vs Nepal ====
Chinese Taipei
5
Likas Indoor Stadium, Court 5
7 July 2013, 17:30 UTC+8

Nepal
0

			1	2	3
1	(Chinese Taipei) (Nepal)	Wang Chi-lin / Lee Chia-hsin; Bijeet Thapa Magar / Shreya Pradhan	21; 6	21; 5
2	(Chinese Taipei) (Nepal)	Yang Yi-hsiang; Dipesh Dhami	21; 10	21; 6
3	(Chinese Taipei) (Nepal)	Yu Chien-hui; Sichhya Shrestha	21; 1	21; 7
4	(Chinese Taipei) (Nepal)	Tien Tzu-chieh / Wang Chi-lin; Dipesh Dhami / Bijeet Thapa Magar	21; 11	21; 13
5	(Chinese Taipei) (Nepal)	Chang Ching-hui / Chang Hsin-tien; Shreya Pradhan / Sichhya Shrestha	21; 3	21; 9

==== Vietnam vs Nepal ====
Vietnam
5
Likas Indoor Stadium, Court ct5
8 July 2013, 09:30 UTC+8

Nepal
0

			1	2	3
1	(Vietnam) (Nepal)	Ngô Xuân Tú / Trần Thị Linh Giang; Bijeet Thapa Magar / Shreya Pradhan	21; 7	21; 3
2	(Vietnam) (Nepal)	Đỗ Tuấn Đức; Dipesh Dhami	21; 10	21; 14
3	(Vietnam) (Nepal)	Nguyễn Thùy Linh; Sichhya Shrestha	21; 8	21; 13
4	(Vietnam) (Nepal)	Ngô Xuân Tú / Phạm Cao Cường; Dipesh Dhami / Bijeet Thapa Magar	19; 21	21; 10	21; 10
5	(Vietnam) (Nepal)	Nguyễn Thùy Linh / Trần Thị Linh Giang; Shreya Pradhan / Sichhya Shrestha	21; 10	21; 11

==== China vs Chinese Taipei ====
China
3
Likas Indoor Stadium, Court 3
8 July 2013, 17:00 UTC+8

Chinese Taipei
2

			1	2	3
1	(China) (Chinese Taipei)	Huang Kaixiang / Chen Qingchen; Tien Tzu-chieh / Chang Ching-hui	21; 17	21; 14
2	(China) (Chinese Taipei)	Lin Guipu; Wang Tzu-wei	14; 21	9; 21
3	(China) (Chinese Taipei)	Liu Yuchen / Li Junhui; Tien Tzu-chieh / Wang Chi-lin	13; 21	21; 18	15; 21
4	(China) (Chinese Taipei)	Qin Jinjing; Lee Chia-hsin	18; 21	21; 7	21; 16
5	(China) (Chinese Taipei)	Chen Qingchen / He Jiaxin; Chang Ching-hui / Chang Hsin-tien	21; 13	21; 9

=== Group C ===
Pos	Team	Pld	W	L	MF	MA	MD	GF	GA	GD	PF	PA	PD	Pts	Qualification	Thailand	Japan	India	Uzbekistan
1	Thailand	3	3	0	15	0	+15	30	3	+27	686	399	+287	3	Advance to knockout stage	—	5–0	5–0	5–0
2	Japan	3	2	1	10	5	+5	23	10	+13	645	495	+150	2	Advance to knockout stage		—	5–0	5–0
3	India	3	1	2	5	10	−5	10	20	−10	495	545	−50	1				—	5–0
4	Uzbekistan	3	0	3	0	15	−15	0	30	−30	243	630	−387	0					—

Source: BadmintonCN

==== Thailand vs Uzbekistan ====
Thailand
5
Likas Indoor Stadium, Court 2
7 July 2013, 09:00 UTC+8

Uzbekistan
0

			1	2	3
1	(Thailand) (Uzbekistan)	Pannawit Thongnuam; Amrullo Bakhshullaev	21; 4	21; 15
2	(Thailand) (Uzbekistan)	Busanan Ongbamrungphan; Mariya Pakina	21; 2	21; 4
3	(Thailand) (Uzbekistan)	Kittiphon Chairojkanjana / Sutichon Pol-Gul; Amrullo Bakhshullaev / Husniddin Orziobev	21; 8	21; 9
4	(Thailand) (Uzbekistan)	Pacharapun Chochuwong / Chanisa Teachavorasinskun; Anait Khurshudyan / Valeriya Mushtakova	21; 5	21; 6
5	(Thailand) (Uzbekistan)	Dechapol Puavaranukroh / Puttita Supajirakul; Husniddin Orziobev / Mariya Pakina	21; 4	21; 6

==== Japan vs India ====
Japan
5
Likas Indoor Stadium, Court 6
7 July 2013, 09:30 UTC+8

India
0

			1	2	3
1	(Japan) (India)	Takuro Hoki / Yugo Kobayashi; Shyam Prasad / Ramchandran Shlok	21; 12	21; 14
2	(Japan) (India)	Aya Ohori; Ruthvika Shivani Gadde	27; 25	21; 12
3	(Japan) (India)	Takuto Inoue; Harsheel Dani	24; 22	21; 14
4	(Japan) (India)	Chisato Hoshi / Ayako Sakuramoto; Ruthvika Shivani Gadde / Poorvisha S. Ram	21; 16	21; 15
5	(Japan) (India)	Hashiru Shimono / Wakana Nagahara; Sanyam Shukla / Jakkampudi Meghana	21; 18	21; 17

==== Thailand vs India ====
Thailand
5
Likas Indoor Stadium, Court 1
8 July 2013, 09:00 UTC+8

India
0

			1	2	3
1	(Thailand) (India)	Dechapol Puavaranukroh / Puttita Supajirakul; Sanyam Shukla / Meghana Jakkampudi	21; 11	21; 14
2	(Thailand) (India)	Sitthikom Thammasin; Aditya Joshi	21; 13	21; 17
3	(Thailand) (India)	Kittinupong Kedren / Dechapol Puavaranukroh; Sanyam Shukla / Vinay Kumar Singh	21; 13	21; 17
4	(Thailand) (India)	Busanan Ongbamrungphan; Ruthvika Shivani Gadde	21; 12	21; 13
5	(Thailand) (India)	Narissapat Lam / Puttita Supajirakul; Meghana Jakkampudi / Poorvisha S. Ram	21; 7	21; 3

==== Japan vs Uzbekistan ====
Japan
5
Likas Indoor Stadium, Court 4
8 July 2013, 09:30 UTC+8

Uzbekistan
0

			1	2	3
1	(Japan) (Uzbekistan)	Yusuke Onodera; Amrullo Bakhshullaev	21; 7	21; 7
2	(Japan) (Uzbekistan)	Mayu Matsumoto; Mariya Pakina	21; 5	21; 9
3	(Japan) (Uzbekistan)	Yu Igarashi / Kohei Matsumoto; Amrullo Bakhshullaev / Husniddin Orziobev	21; 3	21; 8
4	(Japan) (Uzbekistan)	Arisa Higashino / Tomoya Inoue; Valeriya Mushtakova / Mariya Pakina	21; 9	21; 8
5	(Japan) (Uzbekistan)	Hashiru Shimono / Wakana Nagahara; Husniddin Orziobev / Anait Khurshudyan	21; 5	21; 3

==== Thailand vs Japan ====
Thailand
5
Likas Indoor Stadium, Court 4
8 July 2013, 17:30 UTC+8

Japan
0

			1	2	3
1	(Thailand) (Japan)	Dechapol Puavaranukroh / Puttita Supajirakul; Hashiru Shimono / Wakana Nagahara	14; 21	21; 12	21; 17
2	(Thailand) (Japan)	Sitthikom Thammasin; Takuto Inoue	21; 13	21; 17
3	(Thailand) (Japan)	Kittinupong Kedren / Dechapol Puavaranukroh; Takuro Hoki / Yugo Kobayashi	21; 17	15; 21	21; 15
4	(Thailand) (Japan)	Busanan Ongbamrungphan; Aya Ohori	21; 8	24; 26	21; 15
5	(Thailand) (Japan)	Narissapat Lam / Puttita Supajirakul; Chisato Hoshi / Ayako Sakuramoto	21; 12	24; 22

==== India vs Uzbekistan ====
India
5
Likas Indoor Stadium, Court 5
8 July 2013, 17:30 UTC+8

Uzbekistan
0

			1	2	3
1	(India) (Uzbekistan)	Arun George; Husniddin Orziobev	21; 10	21; 13
2	(India) (Uzbekistan)	Reshma Karthik; Mariya Pakina	21; 13	21; 17
3	(India) (Uzbekistan)	Shyam Prasad / Ramchandran Shlok; Amrullo Bakhshullaev / Husniddin Orziobev	21; 8	21; 9
4	(India) (Uzbekistan)	Meghana Jakkampudi / Poorvisha S. Ram; Anait Khurshudyan / Valeriya Mushtakova	21; 4	21; 14
5	(India) (Uzbekistan)	Vinay Kumar Singh / Kuhoo Garg; Amrullo Bakhshullaev / Mariya Pakina	21; 13	21; 15

=== Group D ===
Pos	Team	Pld	W	L	MF	MA	MD	GF	GA	GD	PF	PA	PD	Pts	Qualification	South Korea	Hong Kong	Sri Lanka	Macau
1	South Korea	3	3	0	15	0	+15	30	2	+28	660	327	+333	3	Advance to knockout stage	—	5–0	5–0	5–0
2	Hong Kong	3	2	1	10	5	+5	22	10	+12	588	481	+107	2	Advance to knockout stage		—	5–0	5–0
3	Sri Lanka	3	1	2	4	11	−7	9	22	−13	458	583	−125	1				—	4–1
4	Macau	3	0	3	1	14	−13	2	29	−27	326	641	−315	0					—

Source: BadmintonCN

==== South Korea vs Macau ====
South Korea
5
Likas Indoor Stadium, Court 4
7 July 2013, 17:30 UTC+8

Macau
0

			1	2	3
1	(South Korea) (Macau)	Kim Jae-hwan / Kim Jung-ho; Wan Chon Man / Vong Iat Chon	21; 3	21; 2
2	(South Korea) (Macau)	Jeon Joo-i; Ng Weng Chi	21; 5	21; 5
3	(South Korea) (Macau)	Seo Seung-jae; Lou Hok Man	21; 9	21; 4
4	(South Korea) (Macau)	Chae Yoo-jung / Kim Ji-won; Gong Xue Xin / Kuan Chi Leng	21; 3	21; 7
5	(South Korea) (Macau)	Park Se-woong / Lee Sun-min; Jason Lo / Wong Kit Ieng	21; 7	21; 8

==== Hong Kong vs Sri Lanka ====
Hong Kong
5
Likas Indoor Stadium, Court 6
7 July 2013, 17:30 UTC+8

Sri Lanka
0

			1	2	3
1	(Hong Kong) (Sri Lanka)	Lee Cheuk Yiu; Buwaneka Goonethilleka	21; 10	21; 14
2	(Hong Kong) (Sri Lanka)	Ng Wing Yung; Kavidi Sirimannage	21; 10	21; 18
3	(Hong Kong) (Sri Lanka)	Lee Cheuk Yiu / Tang Chun Man; Sachin Dias / Buwaneka Goonethilleka	21; 15	21; 13
4	(Hong Kong) (Sri Lanka)	Tsang Wing Chiu / Wu Yi Ting; Yasmitha Sankapale Dayarathne / Illmee Warangana de Silva	21; 6	21; 13
5	(Hong Kong) (Sri Lanka)	Tang Chun Man / Ng Wing Yung; Sachin Dias / Kavidi Sirimannage	21; 18	21; 14

==== South Korea vs Sri Lanka ====
South Korea
5
Likas Indoor Stadium, Court 3
8 July 2013, 09:00 UTC+8

Sri Lanka
0

			1	2	3
1	(South Korea) (Sri Lanka)	Heo Kwang-hee; Sachin Dias	21; 12	21; 15
2	(South Korea) (Sri Lanka)	Lee Se-yeon; Kavidi Sirimannage	21; 16	21; 3
3	(South Korea) (Sri Lanka)	Lee Seung-hoon / Seo Seung-jae; Sachin Dias / Buwaneka Goonethilleka	21; 12	21; 6
4	(South Korea) (Sri Lanka)	Lee Sun-min / Lee Boon; Yasmitha Sankapale Dayarathne / Illmee Warangana de Silva	21; 6	21; 6
5	(South Korea) (Sri Lanka)	Kim Jae-hwan / Kim Na-yeong; Buwaneka Goonethilleka / Kavidi Sirimannage	21; 12	21; 18

==== Hong Kong vs Macau ====
Hong Kong
5
Likas Indoor Stadium, Court 6
8 July 2013, 09:30 UTC+8

Macau
0

			1	2	3
1	(Hong Kong) (Macau)	Tang Chun Man / Ng Wing Yung; Iek U Ieong / Wong Sok Man	21; 9	21; 13
2	(Hong Kong) (Macau)	Chang Tak Ching; Jason Lo	21; 9	21; 9
3	(Hong Kong) (Macau)	Yonny Chung / Yeung Shing Choi; Iek U Ieong / Lou Hok Man	21; 10	21; 9
4	(Hong Kong) (Macau)	Tsang Wing Chiu; Wong Kit Ieng	21; 12	21; 10
5	(Hong Kong) (Macau)	Ng Tsz Yau / Yeung Sum Yee; Ng Weng Chi / Wong Sok Man	21; 13	21; 16

==== South Korea vs Hong Kong ====
South Korea
5
Likas Indoor Stadium, Court 2
8 July 2013, 17:00 UTC+8

Hong Kong
0

			1	2	3
1	(South Korea) (Hong Kong)	Kim Hyo-min; Ng Wing Yung	21; 13	21; 11
2	(South Korea) (Hong Kong)	Jeon Hyeok-jin; Tang Chun Man	21; 14	21; 16
3	(South Korea) (Hong Kong)	Chae Yoo-jung / Kim Ji-won; Tsang Wing Chiu / Yeung Nga Ting	21; 5	21; 9
4	(South Korea) (Hong Kong)	Choi Sol-gyu / Park Se-woong; Lee Cheuk Yiu / Yeung Shing Choi	16; 21	21; 19	21; 14
5	(South Korea) (Hong Kong)	Kim Jung-ho / Kim Ji-won; Tang Chun Man / Ng Wing Yung	21; 16	14; 21	21; 9

==== Sri Lanka vs Macau ====
Sri Lanka
4
Likas Indoor Stadium, Court 6
8 July 2013, 17:30 UTC+8

Macau
1

			1	2	3
1	(Sri Lanka) (Macau)	Buwaneka Goonethilleka / Kavidi Sirimannage; Lou Hok Man / Wong Kit Ieng	21; 8	21; 13
2	(Sri Lanka) (Macau)	Sachin Dias; Jason Lo	21; 18	21; 10
3	(Sri Lanka) (Macau)	Kavidi Sirimannage; Ng Weng Chi	21; 11	21; 13
4	(Sri Lanka) (Macau)	Sachin Dias / Buwaneka Goonethilleka; Iek U Ieong / Lou Hok Man	21; 16	21; 14
5	(Sri Lanka) (Macau)	Yasmitha Sankapale Dayarathne / Illmee Warangana de Silva; Wong Kit Ieng / Wong Sok Man	16; 21	21; 18	16; 21

== Knockout stage ==
=== Bracket ===
Quarter-finals
9 July
Malaysia	1
Japan	3
9 July
China	3
Hong Kong	0
9 July
Indonesia	3
Thailand	2
9 July
Chinese Taipei	2
South Korea	3

Semi-finals
9 July
Japan	0
China	3
9 July
Indonesia	1
South Korea	3

Final
10 July
China	3
South Korea	1

=== Quarter-finals ===
==== Malaysia vs Japan ====
Malaysia
1
Likas Indoor Stadium, Court 1
9 July 2013, 09:00 UTC+8

Japan
3

			1	2	3
1	(Malaysia) (Japan)	Chua Khek Wei / Yap Cheng Wen; Hashiru Shimono / Wakana Nagahara	20; 22	17; 21
2	(Malaysia) (Japan)	Soong Joo Ven; Takuto Inoue	21; 16	21; 15
3	(Malaysia) (Japan)	Darren Isaac Devadass / Ong Yew Sin; Takuro Hoki / Yugo Kobayashi	15; 21	21; 10	16; 21
4	(Malaysia) (Japan)	Kisona Selvaduray; Aya Ohori	10; 21	21; 15	15; 21
5	(Malaysia) (Japan)	Joyce Choong / Yap Cheng Wen; Chisato Hoshi / Ayako Sakuramoto				not played

==== China vs Hong Kong ====
China
3
Likas Indoor Stadium, Court 2
9 July 2013, 09:00 UTC+8

Hong Kong
0

			1	2	3
1	(China) (Hong Kong)	Liu Yuchen / Chen Qingchen; Tang Chun Man / Ng Wing Yung	19; 21	21; 9	21; 17
2	(China) (Hong Kong)	Zhao Junpeng; Lee Cheuk Yiu	17; 21	21; 17	21; 12
3	(China) (Hong Kong)	Li Junhui / Liu Yuchen; Yonny Chung / Yeung Shing Choi	21; 9	21; 11
4	(China) (Hong Kong)	He Bingjiao; Ng Tsz Yau				not played
5	(China) (Hong Kong)	Chen Qingchen / He Jiaxin; Tsang Wing Chiu / Yeung Nga Ting				not played

==== Indonesia vs Thailand ====
Indonesia
3
Likas Indoor Stadium, Court 3
9 July 2013, 09:00 UTC+8

Thailand
2

			1	2	3
1	(Indonesia) (Thailand)	Kevin Sanjaya Sukamuljo / Masita Mahmudin; Dechapol Puavaranukroh / Puttita Supajirakul	22; 20	21; 19
2	(Indonesia) (Thailand)	Fikri Ihsandi Hadmadi; Sitthikom Thammasin	17; 21	15; 21
3	(Indonesia) (Thailand)	Arya Maulana Aldiartama / Kevin Sanjaya Sukamuljo; Kittinupong Kedren / Dechapol Puavaranukroh	21; 14	21; 15
4	(Indonesia) (Thailand)	Hanna Ramadini; Busanan Ongbamrungphan	14; 21	10; 21
5	(Indonesia) (Thailand)	Setyana Mapasa / Rosyita Eka Putri Sari; Narissapat Lam / Puttita Supajirakul	19; 21	21; 17	21; 16

==== Chinese Taipei vs South Korea ====
Chinese Taipei
2
Likas Indoor Stadium, Court 4
9 July 2013, 09:00 UTC+8

South Korea
3

			1	2	3
1	(Chinese Taipei) (South Korea)	Wang Tzu-wei; Heo Kwang-hee	21; 8	18; 21	22; 20
2	(Chinese Taipei) (South Korea)	Lee Chia-hsin; Lee Se-yeon	11; 21	27; 25	16; 21
3	(Chinese Taipei) (South Korea)	Tien Tzu-chieh / Wang Chi-lin; Kim Jae-hwan / Kim Jung-ho	20; 22	21; 15	21; 13
4	(Chinese Taipei) (South Korea)	Chang Ching-hui / Chang Hsin-tien; Chae Yoo-jung / Kim Ji-won	10; 21	15; 21
5	(Chinese Taipei) (South Korea)	Wang Chi-lin / Lee Chia-hsin; Choi Sol-gyu / Chae Yoo-jung	21; 19	12; 21	7; 21

=== Semi-finals ===
==== Japan vs China ====
Japan
0
Likas Indoor Stadium, Court 1
9 July 2013, 17:00 UTC+8

China
3

			1	2	3
1	(Japan) (China)	Hashiru Shimono / Wakana Nagahara; Huang Kaixiang / Chen Qingchen	7; 21	17; 21
2	(Japan) (China)	Yusuke Onodera; Lin Guipu	15; 21	20; 22
3	(Japan) (China)	Takuro Hoki / Yugo Kobayashi; Li Junhui / Liu Yuchen	15; 21	16; 21
4	(Japan) (China)	Aya Ohori; Qin Jinjing				not played
5	(Japan) (China)	Chisato Hoshi / Ayako Sakuramoto; Chen Qingchen / He Jiaxin				not played

==== Indonesia vs South Korea ====
Indonesia
1
Likas Indoor Stadium, Court 2
9 July 2013, 17:00 UTC+8

South Korea
3

			1	2	3
1	(Indonesia) (South Korea)	Arya Maulana Aldiartama / Kevin Sanjaya Sukamuljo; Kim Jung-ho / Park Se-woong	21; 9	21; 17
2	(Indonesia) (South Korea)	Hanna Ramadini; Kim Hyo-min	11; 21	10; 21
3	(Indonesia) (South Korea)	Fikri Ihsandi Hadmadi; Jeon Hyeok-jin	19; 21	22; 20	18; 21
4	(Indonesia) (South Korea)	Setyana Mapasa / Rosyita Eka Putri Sari; Kim Ji-won / Lee Sun-min	7; 21	6; 21
5	(Indonesia) (South Korea)	Kevin Sanjaya Sukamuljo / Masita Mahmudin; Choi Sol-gyu / Chae Yoo-jung				not played

=== Final ===
==== China vs South Korea ====
China
3
Likas Indoor Stadium, Court 1
10 July 2013, 09:00 UTC+8

South Korea
1

			1	2	3
1	(China) (South Korea)	Huang Kaixiang / Chen Qingchen; Choi Sol-gyu / Chae Yoo-jung	21; 18	21; 9
2	(China) (South Korea)	Lin Guipu; Jeon Hyeok-jin	20; 22	17; 21
3	(China) (South Korea)	Li Junhui / Liu Yuchen; Choi Sol-gyu / Park Se-woong	18; 21	21; 16	21; 8
4	(China) (South Korea)	Qin Jinjing; Kim Hyo-min	22; 20	21; 12
5	(China) (South Korea)	Chen Qingchen / He Jiaxin; Lee Sun-min / Kim Ji-won				not played
