= 2012 Asian Junior Badminton Championships – Girls doubles =

Tournament details
- Dates: 3 – 7 July 2012
- Edition: 15
- Venue: Gimcheon Indoor Stadium
- Location: Gimcheon, South Korea

The Girls' Doubles tournament of the 2012 Asian Junior Badminton Championships was held from July 3–7 in Gimcheon, South Korea. The gold medalist in the last edition were Suci Rizki Andini and Tiara Rosalia Nuraidah from Indonesia. Malaysian pair Chow Mei Kuan / Lee Meng Yean No. 3 seeded and unseeded players Chen Qingchen / He Jiaxin of China finished in the semifinals round, settle for the bronze medal. The top seeded Lee So-hee / Shin Seung-chan of South Korea emerged as the champion after beat Huang Yaqiong / Yu Xiaohan of China in the finals with the score 17–21, 21–15, 21–17.

== Seeded ==
1. (South Korea) Lee So-hee / Shin Seung-chan (champion)
2. (Indonesia) Shella Devi Aulia / Anggia Shitta Awanda (quarter-final)
3. (Malaysia) Chow Mei Kuan / Lee Meng Yean (semi-final)
4. (Thailand) Wiranpatch Hongchookeat / Puttita Supajirakul (quarter-final)
5. (Thailand) Narissapat Lam / Maetanee Phattanaphitoon (third round)
6. (Indonesia) Melati Daeva Oktaviani / Rosyita Eka Putri Sari (quarter-final)
7. (Vietnam) Le Thu Huyen / Pham Nhu Thao (second round)
8. (Hong Kong) Cheung Ying Mei / Yuen Sin Ying (third round)

== Draw ==
=== Finals ===
Quarterfinals
1	(South Korea) Lee So-hee (South Korea) Shin Seung-chan	21	21
6	(Indonesia) Melati Daeva Oktaviani (Indonesia) Rosyita Eka Putri Sari	6	10
3	(Malaysia) Chow Mei Kuan (Malaysia) Lee Meng Yean	13	21	21
(South Korea) Chae Yoo-jung (South Korea) Kim Ji-won	21	19	18
(China) Huang Yaqiong (China) Yu Xiaohan	21	0
4	(Thailand) Wiranpatch Hongchookeat (Thailand) Puttita Supajirakul	16	0^{r}
(China) Chen Qingchen (China) He Jiaxin	22	21
2	(Indonesia) Shella Devi Aulia (Indonesia) Anggia Shitta Awanda	20	12

Semifinals
1	(South Korea) Lee So-hee (South Korea) Shin Seung-chan	21	21
3	(Malaysia) Chow Mei Kuan (Malaysia) Lee Meng Yean	14	14
(China) Huang Yaqiong (China) Yu Xiaohan	23	21
(China) Chen Qingchen (China) He Jiaxin	21	10

Final
1	(South Korea) Lee So-hee (South Korea) Shin Seung-chan	17	21	21
(China) Huang Yaqiong (China) Yu Xiaohan	21	15	17

=== Top Half ===
==== Section 1 ====
First round	Second round				Third round
	1	(South Korea) Lee S-h (South Korea) Shin S-c	21	21
		(China) Huang DP (China) Xiong MJ	16	15
					1	(South Korea) Lee S-h (South Korea) Shin S-c	21	21
						(Chinese Taipei) Chen S-y (Chinese Taipei) Chen T-y	19	10
		(Hong Kong) Ng W Y (Hong Kong) Tsang W C	12	7
		(Chinese Taipei) Chen S-y (Chinese Taipei) Chen T-y	21	21

==== Section 2 ====
First round
(Japan) M Nakamura (Japan) A Ohori	21	23
(Thailand) S Suwannakitborihan (Thailand) P Thawathanakul	14	21

Second round
6	(Indonesia) M D Oktaviani (Indonesia) R E Putri Sari
(Vietnam) Dinh T P H (Vietnam) Thai V N	w	/	o
(Singapore) E Chua (Singapore) F Seah	15	17
(Japan) M Nakamura (Japan) A Ohori	21	21

Third round
6	(Indonesia) M D Oktaviani (Indonesia) R E Putri Sari	21	21
(Japan) M Nakamura (Japan) A Ohori	18	14

==== Section 3 ====
First round	Second round				Third round
	3	(Malaysia) Chow M K (Malaysia) Lee M Y	21	21
		(Indonesia) M D Giovani (Indonesia) N K M Istirani	18	15
					3	(Malaysia) Chow M K (Malaysia) Lee M Y	21	17	21
						(Japan) C Hoshi (Japan) A Sakuramoto	17	21	10
		(Chinese Taipei) Lin H-y (Chinese Taipei) Lin S-y	13	7
		(Japan) C Hoshi (Japan) A Sakuramoto	21	21

==== Section 4 ====
First round
(South Korea) Chae Y-j (South Korea) Kim J-w	21	21
(Vietnam) Le H T (Vietnam) Nguyen H T	6	2

Second round
5	(Thailand) N Lam (Thailand) M Phattanaphitoon	21	21
(India) M Jakkampudi (India) M Kukkapalli	9	12
(Sri Lanka) M Fonseka (Sri Lanka) S Illangakoon	12	4
(South Korea) Chae Y-j (South Korea) Kim J-w	21	21

Third round
5	(Thailand) N Lam (Thailand) M Phattanaphitoon	21	18	19
(South Korea) Chae Y-j (South Korea) Kim J-w	11	21	21

=== Bottom Half ===
==== Section 5 ====
First round
(South Korea) Chae H-h (South Korea) Kang J-y	9	20
(China) Huang YQ (China) Yu XH	21	22

Second round
(China) Huang YQ (China) Yu XH	21	21
(Uzbekistan) A Khurshudyan (Uzbekistan) V Mushtakova	3	2
(Malaysia) Chin K M (Malaysia) Ti W C	18	18
8	(Hong Kong) Cheung Y M (Hong Kong) Yuen S Y	21	21

Third round
(China) Huang YQ (China) Yu XH	21	21
8	(Hong Kong) Cheung Y M (Hong Kong) Yuen S Y	9	10

==== Section 6 ====
First round	Second round				Third round
		(India) R S Gadde (India) P S Ram	21	21
		(Chinese Taipei) Chang Y-h (Chinese Taipei) Shih Y-c	12	18
						(India) R S Gadde (India) P S Ram	21	19	14
					4	(Thailand) W Hongchookeat (Thailand) P Supajirakul	17	21	21
		(Japan) S Hayata (Japan) A Watanabe	17	12
	4	(Thailand) W Hongchookeat (Thailand) P Supajirakul	21	21

==== Section 7 ====
First round
(South Korea) Kim H-r (South Korea) Seong S-y	21	21
(Singapore) J Chua (Singapore) Gao YM	11	10

Second round
(South Korea) Kim H-r (South Korea) Seong S-y	21	21
(India) R Das (India) A S Sunil	10	15
(China) Chen QC (China) He JX	21	21
7	(Vietnam) Le T H (Vietnam) Pham N T	15	19

Third round
(South Korea) Kim H-r (South Korea) Seong S-y	10	12
(China) Chen QC (China) He JX	21	21

==== Section 8 ====
First round	Second round				Third round
		(Sri Lanka) O Kuruppu (Sri Lanka) K I Sirimannage	13	6
		(South Korea) Han G-h (South Korea) Lee S-m	21	21
						(South Korea) Han G-h (South Korea) Lee S-m	16	21	15
					2	(Indonesia) S D Aulia (Indonesia) A S Awanda	21	15	21
		(Malaysia) R N A Shah (Malaysia) Peck Y W	13	12
	2	(Indonesia) S D Aulia (Indonesia) A S Awanda	21	21
