= 2013 Asian Junior Badminton Championships – Girls doubles =

Tournament details
- Dates: 10 – 14 July 2013
- Edition: 16
- Venue: Likas Indoor Stadium
- Location: Kota Kinabalu, Malaysia

The Girls' Doubles tournament of the 2013 Asian Junior Badminton Championships was held from July 10–14 in Kota Kinabalu, Malaysia. South Korean pair Lee So-hee and Shin Seung-chan were the gold medalist in the last edition. The top two seeded Lam Narissapat / Puttita Supajirakul of Thailand and Chae Yoo-jung / Kim Ji-won of South Korea finished in the semifinals round, and settle for the bronze medal. The gold medal went to Chinese pair Huang Dongping and Jia Yifan after an all-Chinese final versus their teammates Chen Qingchen and He Jiaxin that they won by 21–19, 21–16.

== Seeded ==
1. (Thailand) Lam Narissapat / Puttita Supajirakul (semi-final)
2. (South Korea) Chae Yoo-jung / Kim Ji-won (semifinal)
3. (Malaysia) Joyce Choong Wai Chi / Yap Cheng Wen (quarter-final)
4. (China) Chen Qingchen / He Jiaxin (final)
5. (Indonesia) Setyana Mapasa / Rosyita Eka Putri Sari (third round)
6. (Japan) Chisato Hoshi / Ayako Sakuramoto (quarterfinal)
7. (Thailand) Pacharapun Chochuwong / Chanisa Teachavorasinskun (third round)
8. (Chinese Taipei) Chang Ya-han / Shih Yi-chu (third round)

== Draw ==
=== Finals ===
Quarterfinals
1 | (Thailand) Lam Narissapat (Thailand) Puttita Supajirakul | 12 | 21 | 21
6 | (Japan) Chisato Hoshi (Japan) Ayako Sakuramoto | 21 | 13 | 8
3 | (Malaysia) Joyce Choong Wai Chi (Malaysia) Yap Cheng Wen | 8 | 15
(China) Huang Dongping (China) Jia Yifan | 21 | 21
(Japan) Arisa Higashino (Japan) Aoi Matsuda | 10 | 11
4 | (China) Chen Qingchen (China) He Jiaxin | 21 | 21
(China) Du Yue (China) Li Yinhui | 20 | 16
2 | (South Korea) Chae Yoo-jung (South Korea) Kim Ji-won | 22 | 21

Semifinals
1 | (Thailand) Lam Narissapat (Thailand) Puttita Supajirakul | 16 | 11
(China) Huang Dongping (China) Jia Yifan | 21 | 21
4 | (China) Chen Qingchen (China) He Jiaxin | 21 | 19 | 21
2 | (South Korea) Chae Yoo-jung (South Korea) Kim Ji-won | 7 | 21 | 11

Final
(China) Huang Dongping (China) Jia Yifan | 21 | 21
4 | (China) Chen Qingchen (China) He Jiaxin | 19 | 16

=== Top Half ===
==== Section 1 ====
First Round
1 | (Thailand) L Narissapat (Thailand) P Supajirakul
BYE
(Malaysia) N Baharum (Malaysia) Cheah YS
BYE
(South Korea) Lee B (South Korea) Lee S-m
BYE
(India) K Garg (India) P Ram | 6 | 12
(Indonesia) U Khasanah (Indonesia) M Mahmudin | 21 | 21

Second Round
1 | (Thailand) L Narissapat (Thailand) P Supajirakul | 21 | 21
(Malaysia) N Baharum (Malaysia) Cheah YS | 11 | 14
(South Korea) Lee B (South Korea) Lee S-m | 21 | 21 | 10
(Indonesia) U Khasanah (Indonesia) M Mahmudin | 23 | 15 | 21

Third Round
1 | (Thailand) L Narissapat (Thailand) P Supajirakul | 20 | 21 | 21
(Indonesia) U Khasanah (Indonesia) M Mahmudin | 22 | 6 | 10

==== Section 2 ====
First Round
6 | (Japan) C Hoshi (Japan) A Sakuramoto
BYE
(Singapore) E Chua (Singapore) Yeo JM
BYE
(Uzbekistan) A Khurshudyan (Uzbekistan) V Mushtakova
BYE
(Sri Lanka) Y Dayarathne (Sri Lanka) K Sirimannage | 10 | 15
(Chinese Taipei) Chang C-h (Chinese Taipei) Chang H-t | 21 | 21

Second Round
6 | (Japan) C Hoshi (Japan) A Sakuramoto | 21 | 21
(Singapore) E Chua (Singapore) Yeo JM | 16 | 15
(Uzbekistan) A Khurshudyan (Uzbekistan) V Mushtakova | 7 | 6
(Chinese Taipei) Chang C-h (Chinese Taipei) Chang H-t | 21 | 21

Third Round
6 | (Japan) C Hoshi (Japan) A Sakuramoto | 21 | 21
(Chinese Taipei) Chang C-h (Chinese Taipei) Chang H-t | 19 | 16

==== Section 3 ====
First Round
3 | (Malaysia) J Choong (Malaysia) Yap CW
BYE
(Iran) S Aghaei (Iran) Y Beigi
BYE
(Hong Kong) Ng TY (Hong Kong) Yeung NT
BYE
(Nepal) S Pradhan (Nepal) S Shrestha | 7 | 8
(South Korea) Jun J-i (South Korea) Lee M-j | 21 | 21

Second Round
3 | (Malaysia) J Choong (Malaysia) Yap CW | 21 | 21
(Iran) S Aghaei (Iran) Y Beigi | 11 | 13
(Hong Kong) Ng TY (Hong Kong) Yeung NT | 20 | 18
(South Korea) Jun J-i (South Korea) Lee M-j | 22 | 21

Third Round
3 | (Malaysia) J Choong (Malaysia) Yap CW | 22 | 21
(South Korea) Jun J-i (South Korea) Lee M-j | 20 | 17

==== Section 4 ====
First Round
5 | (Indonesia) S Mapasa (Indonesia) R Putri Sari
BYE
(Chinese Taipei) Chang C-n (Chinese Taipei) Lin Y-t
BYE
(Malaysia) Chin KM (Malaysia) Ti WC
BYE
(Macau) Ng WC (Macau) Wong KI | 7 | 8
(China) Huang DP (China) Jia YF | 21 | 21

Second Round
5 | (Indonesia) S Mapasa (Indonesia) R Putri Sari | 21 | 21
(Malaysia) Chin KM (Malaysia) Ti WC | 8 | 11
(Malaysia) Chin KM (Malaysia) Ti WC | 14 | 14
(China) Huang DP (China) Jia YF | 21 | 21

Third Round
5 | (Indonesia) S Mapasa (Indonesia) R Putri Sari | 17 | 3^{r}
(China) Huang DP (China) Jia YF | 21 | 13

=== Bottom Half ===
==== Section 5 ====
First Round
(Hong Kong) Ng WY (Hong Kong) Tsang WC | 14 | 21
(Singapore) G Chua (Singapore) F Seah | 21 | 23
BYE
(Japan) A Higashino (Japan) A Matsuda
(Sri Lanka) M Beruwalage (Sri Lanka) M Fonseka | 12 | 12
(Indonesia) F Kusumawati (Indonesia) D Surya | 21 | 21
BYE
7 | (Thailand) P Chochuwong (Thailand) C Teachavorasinskun

Second Round
(Singapore) G Chua (Singapore) F Seah | 13 | 9
(Japan) A Higashino (Japan) A Matsuda | 21 | 21
(Indonesia) F Kusumawati (Indonesia) D Surya | 21 | 19
7 | (Thailand) P Chochuwong (Thailand) C Teachavorasinskun | 23 | 21

Third Round
(Japan) A Higashino (Japan) A Matsuda | 21 | 8 | 22
7 | (Thailand) P Chochuwong (Thailand) C Teachavorasinskun | 17 | 21 | 20

==== Section 6 ====
First Round
(Vietnam) Nguyen TL (Vietnam) Tran TLG | 19 | 21 | 21
SUB | (India) Meghana J. (India) R Karthik | 21 | 19 | 23
BYE
(Malaysia) Goh YC (Malaysia) Peck YW
BYE
(Macau) Kuan CL (Macau) Wong SM
BYE
4 | (China) Chen QC (China) He JX

Second Round
SUB | (India) Meghana J. (India) R Karthik | 9 | 14
(Malaysia) Goh YC (Malaysia) Peck YW | 21 | 21
(Macau) Kuan CL (Macau) Wong SM | 10 | 7
4 | (China) Chen QC (China) He JX | 21 | 21

Third Round
(Malaysia) Goh YC (Malaysia) Peck YW | 13 | 12
4 | (China) Chen QC (China) He JX | 21 | 21

==== Section 7 ====
First Round
(China) Du Y (China) Li YH | 21 | 21
(Japan) M Matsumoto (Japan) W Nagahara | 19 | 7
BYE
(Hong Kong) Wu YT (Hong Kong) Yeung SY
BYE
(Sri Lanka) S Hettiarachchi (Sri Lanka) C Nandasiri
BYE
8 | (Chinese Taipei) Chang Y-h (Chinese Taipei) Shih Y-c

Second Round
(China) Du Y (China) Li YH | 21 | 21
(Hong Kong) Wu YT (Hong Kong) Yeung SY | 10 | 7
(Sri Lanka) S Hettiarachchi (Sri Lanka) C Nandasiri | wo
8 | (Chinese Taipei) Chang Y-h (Chinese Taipei) Shih Y-c

Third Round
(China) Du Y (China) Li YH | 21 | 21
8 | (Chinese Taipei) Chang Y-h (Chinese Taipei) Shih Y-c | 11 | 8

==== Section 8 ====
First Round
(Kazakhstan) N Ismailova (Kazakhstan) A Kassenova | 11 | 10
(Singapore) D Quek (Singapore) N Tan | 21 | 21
BYE
(Malaysia) N Shah (Malaysia) Yap Z
BYE
(India) R Mukherjee (India) S Pardeshi
BYE
2 | (South Korea) Chae Y-j (South Korea) Kim J-w

Second Round
(Singapore) D Quek (Singapore) N Tan | 26 | 22 | 12
(Malaysia) N Shah (Malaysia) Yap Z | 24 | 24 | 21
(India) R Mukherjee (India) S Pardeshi | 9 | 11
2 | (South Korea) Chae Y-j (South Korea) Kim J-w | 21 | 21

Third Round
(Malaysia) N Shah (Malaysia) Yap Z | 15 | 7
2 | (South Korea) Chae Y-j (South Korea) Kim J-w | 21 | 21
