= 2013 BWF World Junior Championships – Girls doubles =

The Girls Doubles tournament of the 2013 BWF World Junior Championships was held from October 29 until November 3. South Korean pair Lee So-hee and Shin Seung-chan won the tournament for the last 2 editions.

South Korea continued their domination in girls doubles after Chae Yoo-jung and Kim Ji-won won the final match 21–19, 21–15 against Chen Qingchen her partner He Jiaxin from China.

== Seeded ==
1. (China) Huang Dongping / Jia Yifan (semi-final)
2. (China) Chen Qingchen / He Jiaxin (final)
3. (Denmark) Julie Finne-Ipsen / Rikke Soby Hansen (quarter-final)
4. (Thailand) Lam Narissapat / Puttita Supajirakul (semi-final)
5. (South Korea) Chae Yoo-jung / Kim Ji-won (champion)
6. (Malaysia) Joyce Choong Wai Chi / Yap Cheng Wen (third round)
7. (Japan) Chisato Hoshi / Ayako Sakuramoto (quarter-final)
8. (Indonesia) Rosyita Eka Putri Sari / Setyana Mapasa (quarter-final)
9. (Thailand) Pacharapun Chochuwong / Chanisa Teachavorasinskun (second round)
10. (Russia) Victoria Dergunova / Olga Morozova (third round)
11. (China) Du Yue / Li Yinhui (third round)
12. (Denmark) Maiken Fruergaard / Isabella Nielsen (second round)
13. (Japan) Arisa Higashino / Aoi Matsuda (quarter-final)
14. (Bulgaria) Mila Ivanova / Maria Mitsova (third round)
15. (Indonesia) Uswatun Khasanah / Masita Mahmudin (third round)
16. (Croatia) Maja Pavlinic / Dorotea Sutara (third round)

== Draw ==
=== Finals ===
Quarterfinals
1	(China) Huang Dongping (China) Jia Yifan	21	21
5/8	(Japan) Chisato Hoshi (Japan) Ayako Sakuramoto	19	16
3/4	(Denmark) Julie Finne-Ipsen (Denmark) Rikke Soby Hansen	8	15
5/8	(South Korea) Chae Yoo-jung (South Korea) Kim Ji-won	21	21
5/8	(Indonesia) Rosyita Eka Putri Sari (Indonesia) Setyana Mapasa	16	21	13
3/4	(Thailand) Lam Narissapat (Thailand) Puttita Supajirakul	21	10	21
9/16	(Japan) Arisa Higashino (Japan) Aoi Matsuda	13	4
2	(China) Chen Qingchen (China) He Jiaxin	21	21

Semifinals
1	(China) Huang Dongping (China) Jia Yifan	20	21	20
5/8	(South Korea) Chae Yoo-jung (South Korea) Kim Ji-won	22	16	22
3/4	(Thailand) Lam Narissapat (Thailand) Puttita Supajirakul	11	17
2	(China) Chen Qingchen (China) He Jiaxin	21	21

Final
5/8	(South Korea) Chae Yoo-jung (South Korea) Kim Ji-won	21	21
2	(China) Chen Qingchen (China) He Jiaxin	19	15

=== Top Half ===
==== Section 1 ====
First Round
1	(China) Huang DP (China) Jia YF
BYE
(Malaysia) Chin KM (Malaysia) Ti WC	10	9
(South Korea) Jun J-i (South Korea) Lee S-m	21	21
9/16	(Thailand) P Chochuwong (Thailand) C Teachavorasinskun	21	21
(Botswana) G Mhlauli (Botswana) T Kabelo	3	4
(United States) A Tang (United States) A Wang	4	8
(Japan) W Nagahara (Japan) R Miyaura	21	21

Second Round
1	(China) Huang DP (China) Jia YF	21	21
(South Korea) Jun J-i (South Korea) Lee S-m	14	16
9/16	(Thailand) P Chochuwong (Thailand) C Teachavorasinskun	15	16
(Japan) W Nagahara (Japan) R Miyaura	21	21

Third Round
1	(China) Huang DP (China) Jia YF	21	22
(Japan) W Nagahara (Japan) R Miyaura	18	20

==== Section 2 ====
First Round
5/8	(Japan) C Hoshi (Japan) A Sakuramoto
BYE
(Malaysia) Goh YC (Malaysia) Peck YW	16	16
(Indonesia) D Surya (Indonesia) F Kusumawati	21	21
9/16	(Croatia) M Pavlinic (Croatia) D Sutara	21	21
(Singapore) G Chua (Singapore) F Seah	13	14
(Russia) K Averkina (Russia) E Kut	12	21	21
(Australia) G Somerville (Australia) J Lai	21	17	17

Second Round
5/8	(Japan) C Hoshi (Japan) A Sakuramoto	21	21
(Indonesia) D Surya (Indonesia) F Kusumawati	14	12
9/16	(Croatia) M Pavlinic (Croatia) D Sutara	21	21
(Russia) K Averkina (Russia) E Kut	14	9

Third Round
5/8	(Japan) C Hoshi (Japan) A Sakuramoto	21	21
9/16	(Croatia) M Pavlinic (Croatia) D Sutara	14	10

==== Section 3 ====
First Round
3/4	(Denmark) J Finne-Ipsen (Denmark) R Hansen
BYE
(Uzbekistan) A Khurshudyan (Uzbekistan) V Mushtakova	3	9
(Hong Kong) Ng TY (Hong Kong) Wu YT	21	21
9/16	(Indonesia) U Khasanah (Indonesia) M Mahmudin	21	21
(Scotland) H MacPherson (Scotland) J MacPherson	6	15
(India) F Mather (India) K Sruthi	12	10
(Chinese Taipei) Wen H-y (Chinese Taipei) Ye J-y	21	21

Second Round
3/4	(Denmark) J Finne-Ipsen (Denmark) R Hansen	21	16	21
(Hong Kong) Ng TY (Hong Kong) Wu YT	15	21	13
9/16	(Indonesia) U Khasanah (Indonesia) M Mahmudin	18	21	21
(Chinese Taipei) Wen H-y (Chinese Taipei) Ye J-y	21	18	10

Third Round
3/4	(Denmark) J Finne-Ipsen (Denmark) R Hansen	17	21	21
9/16	(Indonesia) U Khasanah (Indonesia) M Mahmudin	21	18	18

==== Section 4 ====
First Round
5/8	(South Korea) Chae Y-j (South Korea) Kim J-w	21	21
(Armenia) L Minasyan (Armenia) L Poghosyan	3	3
(France) M Batomene (France) A Tran	19	21	20
(Germany) L Efler (Germany) Y Li	21	14	22
9/16	(Bulgaria) M Ivanova (Bulgaria) M Mitsova	21	18	21
(Sri Lanka) M Fonseka (Sri Lanka) T Hendahewa	8	21	15
(Finland) V Lindberg (Finland) M Mattila	15	21
(Czech Republic) M Lajdova (Czech Republic) D Sikalova	21	23

Second Round
5/8	(South Korea) Chae Y-j (South Korea) Kim J-w	21	21
(Germany) L Efler (Germany) Y Li	9	11
9/16	(Bulgaria) M Ivanova (Bulgaria) M Mitsova	18	21	21
(Czech Republic) M Lajdova (Czech Republic) D Sikalova	21	18	14

Third Round
5/8	(South Korea) Chae Y-j (South Korea) Kim J-w	21	21
9/16	(Bulgaria) M Ivanova (Bulgaria) M Mitsova	10	11

=== Bottom Half ===
==== Section 5 ====
First Round
(South Africa) D Botha (South Africa) A Schoonees	11	11
(France) S Guerin (France) D Lansac	21	21
(United States) C Chow (United States) C Yang	16	13
9/16	(Denmark) M Fruergaard (Denmark) I Nielsen	21	21
(Hong Kong) Chan TK (Hong Kong) Chow KL	16	17
(India) M Jakkampudi (India) P Ram	21	21
(Germany) L Kaepplein (Germany) J Karnott	11	15
5/8	(Indonesia) R Putri Sari (Indonesia) S Mapasa	21	21

Second Round
(France) S Guerin (France) D Lansac	22	20	27
9/16	(Denmark) M Fruergaard (Denmark) I Nielsen	20	22	25
(India) M Jakkampudi (India) P Ram	15	12
5/8	(Indonesia) R Putri Sari (Indonesia) S Mapasa	21	21

Third Round
(France) S Guerin (France) D Lansac	5	11
5/8	(Indonesia) R Putri Sari (Indonesia) S Mapasa	21	21

==== Section 6 ====
First Round
(Sri Lanka) M Beruwelage (Sri Lanka) Y Wedamulla	15	10
(Canada) R Honderich (Canada) B Tam	21	21
(Thailand) N Saengchote (Thailand) S Suwannakitborihan	14	9
9/16	(China) Du Y (China) Li YH	21	21
(Philippines) J De Vera (Philippines) E Inlayo	21	21
(Macau) U TI (Macau) Wong KI	11	6
BYE
3/4	(Thailand) L Narissapat (Thailand) P Supajirakul

Second Round
(Canada) R Honderich (Canada) B Tam	8	3
9/16	(China) Du Y (China) Li YH	21	21
(Philippines) J De Vera (Philippines) E Inlayo	10	10
3/4	(Thailand) L Narissapat (Thailand) P Supajirakul	21	21

Third Round
9/16	(China) Du Y (China) Li YH	13	21	19
3/4	(Thailand) L Narissapat (Thailand) P Supajirakul	21	18	21

==== Section 7 ====
First Round
(Singapore) E Chua (Singapore) Yeo JM	21	21
(Vietnam) Dinh TPH (Vietnam) Do TH	10	17
(South Korea) Kim H-r (South Korea) Kong H-y	18	15
9/16	(Japan) A Higashino (Japan) A Matsuda	21	21
(Mexico) H Gaitan (Mexico) S Solis	11	13
(Spain) C Azurmendi (Spain) I Fernandez	21	21
BYE
5/8	(Malaysia) J Choong (Malaysia) Yap CW

Second Round
(Singapore) E Chua (Singapore) Yeo JM	17	13
9/16	(Japan) A Higashino (Japan) A Matsuda	21	21
(Spain) C Azurmendi (Spain) I Fernandez	11	21
5/8	(Malaysia) J Choong (Malaysia) Yap CW	21	23

Third Round
9/16	(Japan) A Higashino (Japan) A Matsuda	21	19	21
5/8	(Malaysia) J Choong (Malaysia) Yap CW	18	21	17

==== Section 8 ====
First Round
(Turkey) K Karatas (Turkey) O Ozer	21	21
(Finland) M Lindholm (Finland) A Paavola	12	17
(Australia) V Mak (Australia) A Wu	12	12
9/16	(Russia) V Dergunova (Russia) O Morozova	21	21
(Chinese Taipei) Chang C-h (Chinese Taipei) Chang H-t	21	21
(Hong Kong) Tsang WC (Hong Kong) Ng WY	14	14
BYE
2	(China) Chen QC (China) He JX

Second Round
(Turkey) K Karatas (Turkey) O Ozer	8	10
9/16	(Russia) V Dergunova (Russia) O Morozova	21	21
(Chinese Taipei) Chang C-h (Chinese Taipei) Chang H-t	19	14
2	(China) Chen QC (China) He JX	21	21

Third Round
9/16	(Russia) V Dergunova (Russia) O Morozova	13	21	9
2	(China) Chen QC (China) He JX	21	17	21
