= 2013 BWF World Junior Championships – Teams event =

2013 BWF World Junior Championships - Team event
Tournament details
- Dates: 23–27 October
- Edition: 15th
- Level: International
- Nations: 30
- Venue: Hua Mark Stadium
- Location: Bangkok, Thailand

The Team event tournament of the 2013 BWF World Junior Championships was the fifteenth tournament of the BWF World Junior Championships. It was held from October 23–27, 2013 in Bangkok, Thailand. According to the Badminton World Federation (BWF) 32 teams have confirmed their participation. The winner of the tournament would have Suhandinata Cup for about a year until the next BWF World Junior Championships Team Event is held.

== Seedings ==
The seedings for teams competing in the tournament were released on October 11, 2013. It was based on aggregated points from the best players in the world junior ranking. The tournament was divided into four groups, with China and South Korea were the two top seeds, and 2 teams (Indonesia and Japan) in the seeded 3-4 were also put into the same group. another 4 teams were put in the second groups. Eight teams (seeded 9-16) were seeded into third groups and the last sixteen teams were seeded into last groups. The draw was held on the same day in Kuala Lumpur.

=== Group 1 (Seeded 1-4) ===
1. China
2. South Korea
3. Indonesia
4. Japan

=== Group 2 (Seeded 5-8) ===
5. Chinese Taipei
6. Hong Kong
7. Malaysia
8. Thailand

=== Group 3 (Seeded 9-16) ===
9. Bulgaria
10. Denmark
11. France
12. Germany
13. India
14. Russia
15. Singapore
16. Vietnam

=== Group 4 (Seeded 17-32) ===
17. ~~Algeria~~ (Withdrew)
18. Armenia (Debut)
19. Australia
20. Botswana (Debut)
21. Canada
22. Czech Republic
23. Finland
24. ~~Kazakhstan~~ (Withdrew)
25. Philippines
26. Scotland
27. South Africa
28. Spain (Debut)
29. Sri Lanka
30. Turkey
31. United States
32. Uzbekistan

== Group stage ==
Qualified for quarterfinals

=== Group W1 ===
Team	Pts	Pld	W	L	MF	MA
China	3	3	3	0	15	0
Singapore	2	3	2	1	10	5
Australia	1	3	1	2	3	12
Spain	0	3	0	3	2	13

October 23, 2013
China	5-0	Spain
October 23, 2013
Singapore	5-0	Australia
October 23, 2013
China	5-0	Australia
October 23, 2013
Singapore	5-0	Spain
October 24, 2013
China	5-0	Singapore
October 24, 2013
Australia	3-2	Spain

=== Group W2 ===
Team	Pts	Pld	W	L	MF	MA
Chinese Taipei	3	3	3	0	14	1
Russia	2	3	2	1	10	5
Czech Republic	1	3	1	2	5	10
Uzbekistan	0	3	0	3	1	14

October 23, 2013
Chinese Taipei	5-0	Czech Republic
October 23, 2013
Russia	5-0	Uzbekistan
October 23, 2013
Chinese Taipei	5-0	Uzbekistan
October 23, 2013
Russia	4-1	Czech Republic
October 24, 2013
Chinese Taipei	4-1	Russia
October 24, 2013
Uzbekistan	1-4	Czech Republic

=== Group X1 ===
Team	Pts	Pld	W	L	MF	MA
Indonesia	3	3	3	0	15	0
France	2	3	2	1	7	8
Sri Lanka	1	3	1	2	5	10
United States	0	3	0	3	3	12

October 23, 2013
Indonesia	5-0	Sri Lanka
October 23, 2013
France	4-1	United States
October 23, 2013
Indonesia	5-0	United States
October 23, 2013
France	3-2	Sri Lanka
October 24, 2013
Indonesia	5-0	France
October 24, 2013
United States	2-3	Sri Lanka

=== Group X2 ===
Team	Pts	Pld	W	L	MF	MA
Malaysia	3	3	3	0	15	0
Scotland	1	3	1	2	6	9
Bulgaria	1	3	1	2	5	10
Philippines	1	3	1	2	4	11

October 23, 2013
Malaysia	5-0	Scotland
October 23, 2013
Bulgaria	2-3	Philippines
October 23, 2013
Malaysia	5-0	Philippines
October 23, 2013
Bulgaria	3-2	Scotland
October 24, 2013
Malaysia	5-0	Bulgaria
October 24, 2013
Philippines	1-4	Scotland

=== Group Y1 ===
Team	Pts	Pld	W	L	MF	MA
Japan	2	2	2	0	10	0
Germany	1	2	1	1	5	5
Finland	0	2	0	2	0	10

October 23, 2013
Japan	5-0	Finland
October 24, 2013
Germany	5-0	Finland
October 24, 2013
Japan	5-0	Germany

=== Group Y2 ===
Team	Pts	Pld	W	L	MF	MA
Thailand	3	3	3	0	13	2
Denmark	2	3	2	1	11	4
Canada	1	3	1	2	6	9
Botswana	0	3	0	3	0	15

October 23, 2013
Thailand	5-0	Canada
October 23, 2013
Denmark	5-0	Botswana
October 24, 2013
Thailand	5-0	Botswana
October 24, 2013
Denmark	4-1	Canada
October 24, 2013
Thailand	3-2	Denmark
October 24, 2013
Botswana	0-5	Canada

=== Group Z1 ===
Team	Pts	Pld	W	L	MF	MA
South Korea	2	2	2	0	10	0
India	1	2	1	1	5	5
South Africa	0	2	0	2	0	10

October 23, 2013
South Korea	5-0	South Africa
October 24, 2013
India	5-0	South Africa
October 24, 2013
South Korea	5-0	India

=== Group Z2 ===
Team	Pts	Pld	W	L	MF	MA
Vietnam	3	3	3	0	13	2
Hong Kong	2	3	2	1	12	3
Turkey	1	3	1	2	5	10
Armenia	0	3	0	3	0	15

October 23, 2013
Hong Kong	5-0	Armenia
October 23, 2013
Vietnam	5-0	Turkey
October 24, 2013
Hong Kong	5-0	Turkey
October 24, 2013
Vietnam	5-0	Armenia
October 24, 2013
Hong Kong	2-3	Vietnam
October 24, 2013
Turkey	5-0	Armenia

== Knockout stage ==
Quarterfinals
W1	China	3
W2	Chinese Taipei	0
X1	Indonesia	3
X2	Malaysia	1
Y1	Japan	3
Y2	Thailand	2
Z1	South Korea	3
Z2	Vietnam	0

Semifinals
W1	China	2
X1	Indonesia	3
Y1	Japan	1
Z1	South Korea	3

Final
X1	Indonesia	2
Z1	South Korea	3
Third place
W1	China	3
Y1	Japan	2

=== Final ===
==== Indonesia vs South Korea ====
Indonesia
2
Hua Mark Stadium Court 1
27 October 2013

South Korea
3

			1	2	3
1	(Indonesia) (South Korea)	Kevin Sanjaya Sukamuljo / Masita Mahmudin; Choi Sol-kyu / Chae Yoo-jung	21; 19	21; 16
2	(Indonesia) (South Korea)	Jonatan Christie; Jeon Hyuk-jin	16; 21	19; 21
3	(Indonesia) (South Korea)	Kevin Sanjaya Sukamuljo / Arya Maulana Aldiartama; Choi Sol-kyu / Heo Kwang-hee	21; 16	22; 20
4	(Indonesia) (South Korea)	Hanna Ramadhini; Kim Hyo-min	15; 21	18; 21
5	(Indonesia) (South Korea)	Rosyita Eka Putri Sari / Setyana Mapasa; Chae Yoo-jung / Kim Ji-won	18; 21	11; 21

== Final team ranking ==
1. South Korea [2]
2. Indonesia [3/4]
3. China [1]
4. Japan [3/4]
5. Malaysia [5/8]
6. Thailand [5/8]
7. Chinese Taipei [5/8]
8. Vietnam [9/16]
9. Hong Kong [5/8]
10. Singapore [9/16]
11. Denmark [9/16]
12. France [9/16]
13. Russia [9/16]
14. India [9/16]
15. Germany [9/16]
16. Scotland
17. Bulgaria [9/16]
18. Canada
19. Australia
20. Turkey
21. Sri Lanka
22. Finland
23. Czech Republic
24. South Africa
25. Spain
26. Armenia
27. United States
28. Botswana
29. Philippines
30. Uzbekistan
31. ~~Algeria~~ (Withdrew)
32. ~~Kazakhstan~~ (Withdrew)

== See also ==
- 2013 BWF World Junior Championships – Team event playoffs stage
