= Rosyita Eka Putri Sari =

Indonesian badminton player (born 1996)

Personal information
- Born: 6 July 1996 (age 30) Sleman, Yogyakarta, Indonesia
- Height: 1.70 m (5 ft 7 in)
- Weight: 66 kg (146 lb)

Sport
- Country: Indonesia
- Sport: Badminton
- Handedness: Right

Women's & mixed doubles
- Highest ranking: 13 (WD with Della Destiara Haris 16 February 2017)
- BWF profile
Medal record
Women's badminton
Representing Indonesia
SEA Games
Bronze medal – third place	2017 Kuala Lumpur	Women's team
World Junior Championships
Silver medal – second place	2013 Bangkok	Mixed team
Silver medal – second place	2014 Alor Setar	Girls' doubles
Silver medal – second place	2014 Alor Setar	Mixed doubles
Silver medal – second place	2014 Alor Setar	Mixed team
Asian Junior Championships
Bronze medal – third place	2013 Kota Kinabalu	Mixed team

Rosyita Eka Putri Sari (born 6 July 1996) is an Indonesian badminton player specializing in doubles. She is from PB. Djarum, a badminton club in Kudus, Central Java, having joined the club in 2011. She is the girls' and mixed doubles silver medalist of the 2014 World Junior Championships held in Alor Setar, Malaysia.

== Career ==
Putri Sari paired with Della Destiara Haris and started participating in the 2015 Austrian Open International Challenge but was stopped in the semifinals by British pair Heather Olver and Lauren Smith with a rubber sets 20–22, 21–19, 19–21. Better results were obtained one week later in the 2015 German Open Grand Prix Gold tournament as the runner-up of the tournament.

== Achievements ==
=== BWF World Junior Championships ===
Girls' doubles
Year	Venue	Partner	Opponent	Score	Result
2014	Stadium Sultan Abdul Halim; Alor Setar, Malaysia	(Indonesia) Apriyani Rahayu	(China) Chen Qingchen (China) Jia Yifan	11–21, 14–21	Silver

Mixed doubles
Year	Venue	Partner	Opponent	Score	Result
2014	Stadium Sultan Abdul Halim; Alor Setar, Malaysia	(Indonesia) Muhammad Rian Ardianto	(China) Huang Kaixiang (China) Chen Qingchen	12–21, 17–21	Silver

=== BWF Grand Prix (2 titles, 1 runner-up) ===
The BWF Grand Prix had two levels, the Grand Prix and Grand Prix Gold. It was a series of badminton tournaments sanctioned by the Badminton World Federation (BWF) and played between 2007 and 2017.

Women's doubles
Year	Tournament	Partner	Opponent	Score	Result
2014	Vietnam Open	(Indonesia) Maretha Dea Giovani	(Indonesia) Gebby Ristiyani Imawan (Indonesia) Ni Ketut Mahadewi Istarani	21–19, 15–21, 21–10	(gold) Winner
2015	German Open	(Indonesia) Della Destiara Haris	(Denmark) Christinna Pedersen (Denmark) Kamilla Rytter Juhl	18–21, 21–17, 9–21	(silver) Runner-up
2016	Vietnam Open	(Indonesia) Della Destiara Haris	(Indonesia) Tiara Rosalia Nuraidah (Indonesia) Rizki Amelia Pradipta	21–11, 21–15	(gold) Winner

BWF Grand Prix Gold tournament
BWF Grand Prix tournament

=== BWF International Challenge/Series (1 title, 2 runners-up) ===
Women's doubles
Year	Tournament	Partner	Opponent	Score	Result
2013	Maldives International	(Indonesia) Melati Daeva Oktavianti	(Indonesia) Maretha Dea Giovani (Indonesia) Melvira Oklamona	15–21, 15–21	(silver) Runner-up
2014	Malaysia International	(Indonesia) Maretha Dea Giovani	(Japan) Ayane Kurihara (Japan) Naru Shinoya	14–21, 17–21	(silver) Runner-up
2015	Malaysia International	(Indonesia) Della Destiara Haris	(Thailand) Chayanit Chaladchalam (Thailand) Phataimas Muenwong	21–18, 21–11	(gold) Winner

BWF International Challenge tournament
BWF Future Series tournament

=== BWF Junior International (2 titles, 1 runner-up) ===
Girls' doubles
Year	Tournament	Partner	Opponent	Score	Result
2012	German Junior	(Indonesia) Melati Daeva Oktavianti	(South Korea) Joo I-jeon (South Korea) Soo Yeon-yang	21–9, 21–13	(gold) Winner
2012	Indonesia Junior International	(Indonesia) Melati Daeva Oktavianti	(Japan) Miyuki Kato (Japan) Ami Ueno	21–16, 21–10	(gold) Winner
2013	Indonesia Junior International	(Indonesia) Setyana Mapasa	(Indonesia) Uswatun Khasanah (Indonesia) Masita Mahmudin	21–23, 21–16, 15–21	(silver) Runner-up

BWF Junior International Grand Prix tournament
BWF Junior International Challenge tournament
BWF Junior International Series tournament
BWF Junior Future Series tournament

== Performance timeline ==
Key

W	Won	F	Finalist	SF	Semi-finalist
QF	Quarter-finalist	#R	Rounds 4, 3, 2, 1	RR	Round-robin stage
Q#	Qualification round	A	Absent	w/d	Withdrew
G	Gold	S	Silver	B	Bronze
NH	Not held	N/A	Not applicable	DNQ	Did not qualify

=== National team ===
- Junior level

Team events	2012	2013	2014
Asian Junior Championships	QF	B	A
World Junior Championships	4th	S	S

- Senior level

Team event	2016	2017
SEA Games	NH	B
Asia Team Championships	QF	NH
Uber Cup	QF	NH
Sudirman Cup	NH	RR

=== Individual competitions ===
==== Junior level ====
- Girls' doubles

Event	2012	2013	2014
Asian Junior Championships	QF	3R	A
World Junior Championships	QF	QF	S

- Mixed doubles

Event	2014
World Junior Championships	S

==== Senior level ====
===== Women's doubles =====
Events	2016	2017
Asian Championships	2R	2R

Tournament	BWF Superseries / Grand Prix						BWF World Tour					Best
Tournament	2012	2013	2014	2015	2016	2017	2018	2019	2020	2021	2022	Best
Syed Modi International	A	NH	A		1R	A			NH		A	1R ('16)
German Open	A			F	A	QF	A		NH		A	F ('15)
All England Open	A			Q2	2R	1R	A					2R ('16)
Swiss Open	A					QF	A		NH	A		QF ('17)
Korea Masters	A			QF	A				NH		A	QF ('15)
Thailand Open	A						1R	A		NH	A	1R ('18)
Indonesia Masters	1R	QF	QF	2R	SF	NH	A					SF ('16)
Indonesia Open	1R	Q2	Q2	A	1R	QF	1R	A	NH	A		QF ('17)
Malaysia Open	A					2R	A		NH		A	2R ('17)
Malaysia Masters	A	QF	A		1R	A				NH	A	QF ('13)
Singapore Open	A				QF	1R	1R	A	NH		A	QF ('16)
Chinese Taipei Open	A	1R	A		2R	A	2R	A	NH		A	2R ('16, '18)
Vietnam Open	A		W	A	W	A			NH		A	W ('14, '16)
Indonesia Masters Super 100	NA						1R	1R	NH		2R	2R ('22)
Denmark Open	A				1R	A						1R ('16)
French Open	A				QF	A			NH	A		QF ('16)
Macau Open	A			QF	2R	A	1R	A	NH			QF ('15)
Hong Kong Open	A				2R	A			NH			2R ('16)
Australian Open	A				1R	A	QF	A	NH			QF ('18)
New Zealand Open	NH	A				1R	1R	A	NH			1R ('17, '18)
China Open	A				2R	A			NH			2R ('16)
China Masters	A				SF	A			NH			SF ('16)
Dutch Open	A		QF	A					NH	NA		QF ('14)
Hyderabad Open	NH						QF	A	NH			QF ('18)
Lingshui China Masters	NH						1R	A	NH			1R ('18)
Thailand Masters	NH				A	SF	A			NH		SF ('17)
Year-end ranking	135	58	45	57	15	36	93	282	273	377	194	13
Tournament	2012	2013	2014	2015	2016	2017	2018	2019	2020	2021	2022	Best

===== Mixed doubles =====
Tournament	BWF Superseries / Grand Prix			Best
Tournament	2012	2013	2014	Best
Indonesia Masters	A		1R	1R ('14)
Indonesia Open	Q2	A		Q2 ('12)
Year-end ranking	993	—N/a	199	149

== Record against selected opponents ==
Women's doubles results with Della Destiara Haris against World Superseries finalists, World Championship semifinalists, and Olympic quarterfinalists:

- (China) Tian Qing & Zhao Yunlei 0–1
- (Denmark) Christinna Pedersen & Kamilla Rytter Juhl 0–1
- (Japan) Misaki Matsutomo & Ayaka Takahashi 1–0
- (Japan) Shizuka Matsuo & Mami Naito 1–0
- (South Korea) Jung Kyung-eun & Shin Seung-chan 2-3
- (Malaysia) Vivian Hoo Kah Mun & Woon Khe Wei 1–1
