= Narissapat Lam =

Thai badminton player

Personal information
- Born: Narissapat Lam; 7 March 1996 (age 30)

Sport
- Country: Thailand
- Sport: Badminton
- Handedness: Right

Women's doubles
- Highest ranking: 21 (with Saralee Thoungthongkam) (October, 2013)
- Current ranking: 22 (with Saralee Thoungthongkam) (October, 2013)
- BWF profile
Medal record
Representing Thailand
World Junior Championships
Bronze medal – third place	2014 Alor Setar	Mixed team
Bronze medal – third place	2013 Bangkok	Girls' doubles
Asian Junior Championships
Bronze medal – third place	2013 Kota Kinabalu	Girls' doubles
Bronze medal – third place	2010 Kuala Lumpur	Mixed doubles
Bronze medal – third place	2010 Kuala Lumpur	Mixed team

Narissapat Lam (Thai: ณริฎษาพัชร แลม; RTGS: Naritsaphat Laem; born 7 March 1996) is a Thai of Hong Kong descent badminton player who specializes in doubles. In 2012, she won the Thailand Open with Saralee Thoungthongkam to become the youngest player ever to win a major doubles title since the Grand Prix categories began in 2007.

== Achievements ==
=== BWF World Junior Championships ===
Girls' doubles
Year	Venue	Partner	Opponent	Score	Result
2013	Hua Mark Indoor Stadium, Bangkok, Thailand	(Thailand) Puttita Supajirakul	(China) He Jiaxin (China) Chen Qingchen	11–21, 17–21	Bronze

=== Asia Junior Championships ===
Girls' doubles
Year	Venue	Partner	Opponent	Score	Result
2013	Likas Indoor Stadium, Kota Kinabalu, Malaysia	(Thailand) Puttita Supajirakul	(China) Huang Dongping (China) Jia Yifan	16–21, 11–21	Bronze

Mixed doubles
Year	Venue	Partner	Opponent	Score	Result
2010	Stadium Juara, Kuala Lumpur, Malaysia	(Thailand) Pisit Poodchalat	(China) Liu Cheng (China) Bao Yixin	16–21, 11–21	Bronze

=== BWF Grand Prix ===
The BWF Grand Prix has two levels, the Grand Prix and Grand Prix Gold. It is a series of badminton tournaments, sanctioned by the Badminton World Federation (BWF) since 2007.

Women's doubles
Year	Tournament	Partner	Opponent	Score	Result
2012	Thailand Open	(Thailand) Saralee Thoungthongkam	(China) Cheng Shu (China) Pan Pan	21–15, 10–21, 21–13	(gold) Winner

Grand Prix Gold Tournament
Grand Prix Tournament

=== BWF International Challenge/Series ===
Women's doubles
Year	Tournament	Partner	Opponent	Score	Result
2013	Victorian International	(Thailand) Ruethaichanok Laisuan	(Malaysia) Sannatasah Saniru (Australia) Renuga Veeran	21–15, 21–14	(gold) Winner
2013	Smiling Fish International	(Thailand) Puttita Supajirakul	(Thailand) Rodjana Chuthabunditkul (Thailand) Jongkonphan Kittiharakul	21–17, 21–10	(gold) Winner
2013	Hanoi International	(Thailand) Puttita Supajirakul	(Hong Kong) Poon Lok Yan (Hong Kong) Tse Ying Suet	21–18, 17–21, 21–11	(gold) Winner
2011	Smiling Fish International	(Thailand) Maetanee Phattanaphitoon	(Thailand) Chayanit Chalardchaleam (Thailand) Pattharaporn Jindapol	16–21, 18–21	(silver) Runner-up

BWF International Challenge tournament
BWF International Series tournament
