= Puttita Supajirakul =

Thai badminton player (born 1996)

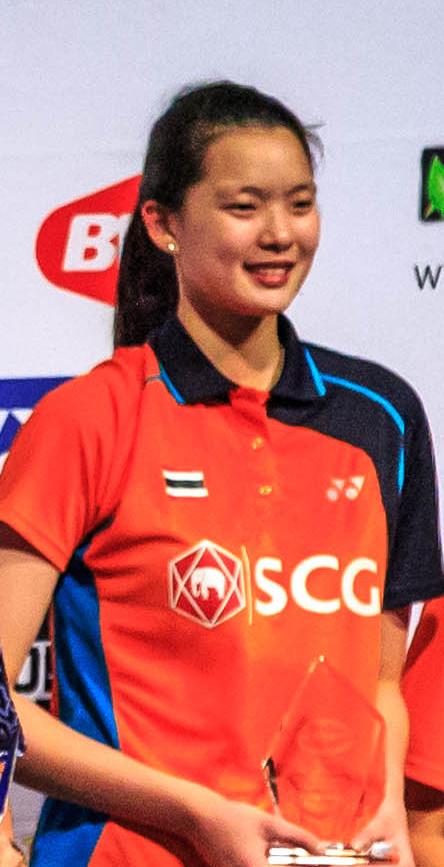

Personal information
- Nickname: Earth
- Born: 29 March 1996 (age 30) Phitsanulok, Thailand
- Height: 1.83 m (6 ft 0 in)

Sport
- Country: Thailand
- Sport: Badminton
- Handedness: Right
- Retired: 30 May 2023

Women's & mixed doubles
- Highest ranking: 9 (WD with Sapsiree Taerattanachai, 22 June 2017); 17 (WD with Supissara Paewsampran, 23 May 2023); 34 (XD, 27 November 2014)
- BWF profile
Medal record
Women's badminton
Representing Thailand
World Championships
Bronze medal – third place	2022 Tokyo	Women's doubles
Sudirman Cup
Bronze medal – third place	2017 Gold Coast	Mixed team
Bronze medal – third place	2019 Nanning	Mixed team
Uber Cup
Silver medal – second place	2018 Bangkok	Women's team
Bronze medal – third place	2020 Aarhus	Women's team
Asian Games
Bronze medal – third place	2018 Jakarta–Palembang	Women's team
Asia Mixed Team Championships
Bronze medal – third place	2017 Ho Chi Minh	Mixed team
Asia Team Championships
Bronze medal – third place	2016 Hyderabad	Women's team
SEA Games
Gold medal – first place	2015 Singapore	Women's team
Gold medal – first place	2017 Kuala Lumpur	Women's team
Gold medal – first place	2019 Philippines	Women's team
Silver medal – second place	2017 Kuala Lumpur	Women's doubles
Bronze medal – third place	2013 Naypyidaw	Women's doubles
Bronze medal – third place	2013 Naypyidaw	Mixed doubles
Asian Youth Games
Silver medal – second place	2013 Nanjing	Mixed doubles
World Junior Championships
Bronze medal – third place	2013 Bangkok	Girls' doubles
Bronze medal – third place	2014 Alor Setar	Mixed team
Asian Junior Championships
Bronze medal – third place	2013 Kota Kinabalu	Girls' doubles

Puttita Supajirakul (Thai: พุธิตา สุภจิรกุล; born 29 March 1996) is a Thai badminton player. She reached a career high as world number 9 in the women's doubles. Supajirakul was the women's doubles bronze medalists at the Asian, and World Juniors and also at the BWF World Championships. Together with Sapsiree Taerattanachai, she recorded as the first Thai women's doubles to medal at the World Championships. She competed at the 2016 Summer Olympics in Rio de Janeiro, Brazil.

Supajirakul was part of Thailand's gold medals-winning team at the 2015, 2017 and 2019 SEA Games in the women's team event. She also helped the national team win the silver medal in the 2018 Uber Cup, the bronze medals in the 2017 and 2019 Sudirman Cups, 2020 Uber Cup, 2018 Asian Games, 2016 Asia Women's Team and at the 2017 Asia Mixed Team Championships.

Supajirakul announced her retirement from the Thai national team through her social media account on 30 May 2023.

== Achievements ==
=== BWF World Championships ===
Women's doubles
Year	Venue	Partner	Opponent	Score	Result
2022	Tokyo Metropolitan Gymnasium, Tokyo, Japan	(Thailand) Sapsiree Taerattanachai	(South Korea) Kim So-yeong (South Korea) Kong Hee-yong	16–21, 21–19, 23–25	Bronze

=== Southeast Asian Games ===
Women's doubles
Year	Venue	Partner	Opponent	Score	Result
2013	Wunna Theikdi Indoor Stadium; Naypyidaw, Myanmar	(Thailand) Sapsiree Taerattanachai	(Indonesia) Nitya Krishinda Maheswari (Indonesia) Greysia Polii	7–21, 11–21	Bronze
2017	Axiata Arena; Kuala Lumpur, Malaysia	(Thailand) Sapsiree Taerattanachai	(Thailand) Jongkolphan Kititharakul (Thailand) Rawinda Prajongjai	16–21, 8–7 retired	Silver

Mixed doubles
Year	Venue	Partner	Opponent	Score	Result
2013	Wunna Theikdi Indoor Stadium; Naypyidaw, Myanmar	(Thailand) Nipitphon Phuangphuapet	(Indonesia) Muhammad Rijal (Indonesia) Debby Susanto	11–21, 21–18, 19–21	Bronze

=== BWF World Junior Championships ===
Girls' doubles
Year	Venue	Partner	Opponent	Score	Result
2013	Hua Mark Indoor Stadium; Bangkok, Thailand	(Thailand) Narissapat Lam	(China) Chen Qingchen (China) He Jiaxin	11–21, 17–21	Bronze

=== Asian Youth Games ===
Mixed doubles
Year	Venue	Partner	Opponent	Score	Result
2013	Sport Institute Gymnasium; Nanjing, China	(Thailand) Dechapol Puavaranukroh	(Japan) Minoru Koga (Japan) Akane Yamaguchi	19–21, 21–9, 17–21	Silver

=== Asian Junior Championships ===
Girls' doubles
Year	Venue	Partner	Opponent	Score	Result
2013	Likas Indoor Stadium; Kota Kinabalu, Malaysia	(Thailand) Narissapat Lam	(China) Huang Dongping (China) Jia Yifan	16–21, 11–21	Bronze

=== BWF World Tour (1 title, 1 runner-up) ===
The BWF World Tour, which was announced on 19 March 2017 and implemented in 2018, is a series of elite badminton tournaments sanctioned by the Badminton World Federation (BWF). The BWF World Tour is divided into levels of World Tour Finals, Super 1000, Super 750, Super 500, Super 300 (part of the HSBC World Tour), and the BWF Tour Super 100.

Women's doubles
Year	Tournament	Level	Partner	Opponent	Score	Result
2019	Thailand Masters	Super 300	(Thailand) Sapsiree Taerattanachai	(China) Li Wenmei (China) Zheng Yu	15–21, 21–15, 21–10	(gold) Winner

Mixed doubles
Year	Tournament	Level	Partner	Opponent	Score	Result
2018	Thailand Masters	Super 300	(Thailand) Dechapol Puavaranukroh	(Malaysia) Chan Peng Soon (Malaysia) Goh Liu Ying	15–21, 21–14, 16–21	(silver) Runner-up

=== BWF Grand Prix (1 title, 4 runners-up) ===
The BWF Grand Prix had two levels, the Grand Prix and Grand Prix Gold. It was a series of badminton tournaments sanctioned by the Badminton World Federation (BWF) and played between 2007 and 2017.

Women's doubles
Year	Tournament	Partner	Opponent	Score	Result
2014	U.S. Open	(Thailand) Sapsiree Taerattanachai	(Indonesia) Shendy Puspa Irawati (Indonesia) Vita Marissa	15–21, 10–21	(silver) Runner-up
2015	Mexico City Open	(Thailand) Sapsiree Taerattanachai	(Japan) Shizuka Matsuo (Japan) Mami Naito	17–21, 21–16, 10–21	(silver) Runner-up
2016	German Open	(Thailand) Sapsiree Taerattanachai	(China) Huang Yaqiong (China) Tang Jinhua	14–21, 18–21	(silver) Runner-up
2016	Thailand Open	(Thailand) Sapsiree Taerattanachai	(Japan) Mayu Matsumoto (Japan) Wakana Nagahara	21–12, 21–17	(gold) Winner
2017	Thailand Masters	(Thailand) Sapsiree Taerattanachai	(China) Chen Qingchen (China) Jia Yifan	16–21, 15–21	(silver) Runner-up

BWF Grand Prix Gold tournament
BWF Grand Prix tournament

=== BWF International Challenge/Series (4 titles, 2 runners-up) ===
Women's doubles
Year	Tournament	Partner	Opponent	Score	Result
2012	Smiling Fish International	(Thailand) Wiranpatch Hongchookeat	(Japan) Emi Moue (Japan) Aya Shimozaki	11–21, 20–22	(silver) Runner-up
2013	Vietnam International	(Thailand) Narissapat Lam	(Hong Kong) Poon Lok Yan (Hong Kong) Tse Ying Suet	21–18, 17–21, 21–11	(gold) Winner
2013	Smiling Fish International	(Thailand) Narissapat Lam	(Thailand) Rodjana Chuthabunditkul (Thailand) Jongkolphan Kititharakul	21–17, 21–10	(gold) Winner
2015	USA International	(Thailand) Sapsiree Taerattanachai	(England) Heather Olver (England) Lauren Smith	21–18, 19–21, 19–21	(silver) Runner-up
2016	Polish Open	(Thailand) Sapsiree Taerattanachai	(Malaysia) Chow Mei Kuan (Malaysia) Lee Meng Yean	21–7, 21–17	(gold) Winner
2018	KaBaL International	(Thailand) Supissara Paewsampran	(Denmark) Elisa Melgaard (Denmark) Sofie Nielsen	21–14, 21–11	(gold) Winner

BWF International Challenge tournament
BWF International Series tournament
