= Masita Mahmudin =

Indonesian badminton player (born 1995)

Personal information
- Born: 2 March 1995 (age 31) Jambi City, Jambi, Indonesia
- Height: 1.67 m (5 ft 6 in)
- Weight: 59 kg (130 lb)

Sport
- Country: Indonesia
- Sport: Badminton
- Handedness: Right

Women's & mixed doubles
- Highest ranking: 171 (WD with Rosyita Eka Putri Sari, 31 January 2023); 65 (XD 19 January 2017)
- Current ranking: 130 (XD with Renaldi Samosir) (28 July 2026)
- BWF profile
Medal record
Women's badminton
Representing Indonesia
World Junior Championships
Silver medal – second place	2013 Bangkok	Mixed doubles
Silver medal – second place	2013 Bangkok	Mixed team
Asian Junior Championships
Bronze medal – third place	2013 Kota Kinabalu	Mixed team

Masita Mahmudin (born 2 March 1995) is an Indonesian badminton player affiliated with Jaya Raya Jakarta club. She was the silver medalists at the 2013 World Junior Championships in the mixed team and doubles event. Mahmudin also part of the national junior team that won the bronze medal at the 2013 Asian Junior Championships.

== Achievements ==
=== BWF World Junior Championships ===
Mixed doubles
Year	Venue	Partner	Opponent	Score	Result	Ref.
2013	Hua Mark Indoor Stadium; Bangkok, Thailand	(Indonesia) Kevin Sanjaya Sukamuljo	(China) Huang Kaixiang (China) Chen Qingchen	18–21, 22–20, 21–23	Silver	

=== BWF Grand Prix (1 runner-up) ===
The BWF Grand Prix had two levels, the Grand Prix and Grand Prix Gold. It was a series of badminton tournaments sanctioned by the Badminton World Federation (BWF) and played between 2007 and 2017.

Mixed doubles
Year	Tournament	Partner	Opponent	Score	Result	Ref.
2017	Vietnam Open	(Indonesia) Riky Widianto	(Indonesia) Alfian Eko Prasetya (Indonesia) Melati Daeva Oktavianti	14–21, 14–21	(silver) Runner-up	

BWF Grand Prix Gold tournament
BWF Grand Prix tournament

=== BWF International Challenge/Series (2 titles, 4 runners-up) ===
Mixed doubles
Year	Tournament	Partner	Opponent	Score	Result	Ref.
2014	Indonesia International	(Indonesia) Lukhi Apri Nugroho	(Indonesia) Hafiz Faizal (Indonesia) Shella Devi Aulia	23–21, 18–21, 21–14	(gold) Winner	
2015	Vietnam International	(Indonesia) Hafiz Faizal	(Indonesia) Fran Kurniawan (Indonesia) Komala Dewi	14–21, 11–21	(silver) Runner-up	
2015	Vietnam International	(Indonesia) Rian Swastedian	(Malaysia) Tan Kian Meng (Malaysia) Peck Yen Wei	21–13, 19–21, 21–17	(gold) Winner	
2018	Singapore International	(Indonesia) Adnan Maulana	(Hong Kong) Yeung Ming Nok (Hong Kong) Ng Tsz Yau	21–19, 7–21, 18–21	(silver) Runner-up	
2025 (I)	Indonesia International	(Indonesia) Renaldi Samosir	(Indonesia) Bobby Setiabudi (Indonesia) Melati Daeva Oktavianti	21–17, 11–21, 16–21	(silver) Runner-up	
2025 (II)	Indonesia International	(Indonesia) Renaldi Samosir	(Indonesia) Bobby Setiabudi (Indonesia) Melati Daeva Oktavianti	8–21, 21–12, 12–21	(silver) Runner-up	

BWF International Challenge tournament
BWF International Series tournament

=== BWF Junior International (2 titles) ===
Girls' doubles
Year	Tournament	Partner	Opponent	Score	Result
2013	Indonesia Junior International	(Indonesia) Uswatun Khasanah	(Indonesia) Setyana Mapasa (Indonesia) Rosyita Eka Putri Sari	23–21, 16–21, 21–15	(gold) Winner

Mixed doubles
Year	Tournament	Partner	Opponent	Score	Result
2013	Indonesia Junior International	(Indonesia) Kevin Sanjaya Sukamuljo	(Indonesia) Ricky Alverino Sidharta (Indonesia) Ristya Ayu Nugraheny	21–19, 21–10	(gold) Winner

BWF Junior International Grand Prix tournament
BWF Junior International Challenge tournament
BWF Junior International Series tournament
BWF Junior Future Series tournament

== Performance timeline ==
Key

W	Won	F	Finalist	SF	Semi-finalist
QF	Quarter-finalist	#R	Rounds 4, 3, 2, 1	RR	Round-robin stage
Q#	Qualification round	A	Absent	w/d	Withdrew
G	Gold	S	Silver	B	Bronze
NH	Not held	N/A	Not applicable	DNQ	Did not qualify

=== National team ===
- Junior level

Team Events	2013
Asian Junior Championships	B
World Junior Championships	S

=== Individual competitions ===
==== Junior level ====
- Girls' doubles

Event	2013
Asian Junior Championships	3R
World Junior Championships	3R

- Mixed doubles

Event	2013	Ref
Asian Junior Championships	2R	
World Junior Championships	S	

==== Senior level ====
===== Women's doubles =====
Tournament	BWF Superseries / Grand Prix					BWF World Tour					Best	Ref
Tournament	2013	2014	2015	2016	2017	2018	2019	2020	2021	2022	Best	Ref
Indonesia Masters	1R	2R	A		NH	A					2R ('14)	
Vietnam Open	A				Q2	A		NH		A	Q2 ('17)	
Indonesia Masters Super 100	NA					2R	A	NH		2R	2R ('18, '22)	
Year-end ranking	238	245	—N/a	—N/a	377	448	428	—N/a	—N/a	194	171	
Tournament	2013	2014	2015	2016	2017	2018	2019	2020	2021	2022	Best	Ref

===== Mixed doubles =====
Tournament	BWF Superseries / Grand Prix						BWF World Tour									Best	Ref
Tournament	2012	2013	2014	2015	2016	2017	2018	2019	2020	2021	2022	2023	2024	2025	2026	Best	Ref
Indonesia Masters	Q2	1R	QF	QF	1R	NH	1R	A		1R	A					QF ('14, '15)	
Thailand Open	A		NH	A	2R	A	1R	A		NH	A					2R ('16)	
Malaysia Masters	A						Q2	A		NH	A					Q2 ('18)	
Indonesia Open	A		Q1	A			1R	A	NH	A						1R ('18)	
Taipei Open	A								NH		A				1R	1R ('26)	
Indonesia Masters Super 100	NA						1R	A	NH		2R	A			1R	QF ('25 II)	
Indonesia Masters Super 100	NA						1R	A	NH		2R	A		QF	Q	QF ('25 II)	
Vietnam Open	A		2R	A	QF	F	A		NH		A					F ('17)	
Chinese Taipei Masters	NH			SF	1R	NH										SF ('15)	
Year-end ranking	859	342	88	172	65	120	124	516	—N/a	489	309	—N/a	—N/a	157		65	
Tournament	2012	2013	2014	2015	2016	2017	2018	2019	2020	2021	2022	2023	2024	2025	2026	Best	Ref
