= Heo Kwang-hee =

South Korean badminton player (born 1995)

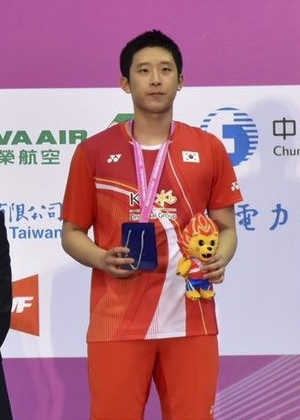
- Heo at the 2019 Chinese Taipei Open

Personal information
- Born: Heo Kwang-hee; 11 August 1995 (age 31) Daejeon, South Korea
- Height: 1.80 m (5 ft 11 in)

Sport
- Country: South Korea
- Sport: Badminton
- Handedness: Right

Men's singles
- Highest ranking: 28 (16 November 2021)
- Current ranking: 37 (31 January 2023)
- BWF profile
Medal record
Men's badminton
Representing South Korea
Sudirman Cup
Bronze medal – third place	2021 Vantaa	Mixed team
Thomas Cup
Bronze medal – third place	2016 Kunshan	Men's team
Asia Team Championships
Bronze medal – third place	2016 Hyderabad	Men's team
Bronze medal – third place	2018 Alor Setar	Men's team
World Junior Championships
Gold medal – first place	2013 Bangkok	Boys' singles
Gold medal – first place	2013 Bangkok	Mixed team
Bronze medal – third place	2012 Gimcheon	Boys' singles
Bronze medal – third place	2012 Gimcheon	Mixed team
Asian Junior Championships
Silver medal – second place	2013 Kota Kinabalu	Mixed team
Bronze medal – third place	2012 Gimcheon	Mixed team

Heo Kwang-hee (Korean: 허광희; born 11 August 1995) is a South Korean badminton player who was educated at the Dankook University. He was selected to join the national team in 2012, and joined the Samsung Electro-Mechanics team in 2014. Heo was the bronze medalists at the 2012 World Junior Championships in the boys' singles and team event, and Asian Junior Championships in the team event. Heo later won the boys' singles and mixed team gold medals at the 2013 World Junior Championships, and the mixed team silver medal at the Asian Junior Championships. In the senior level tournament, Heo was the semi-finalists at the 2017 U.S. and 2018 New Zealand Open. He competed at the 2018 Asian Games and at the 2020 Summer Olympics, is best known for upsetting top-seeded Kento Momota in the group stage of the latter tournament.

== Achievements ==
=== World Junior Championships ===
Boys' singles
Year	Venue	Opponent	Score	Result
2012	Chiba Port Arena; Chiba, Japan	(Japan) Kento Momota	17–21, 8–21	Bronze
2013	Hua Mark Indoor Stadium; Bangkok, Thailand	(Chinese Taipei) Wang Tzu-wei	21–11, 21–12	Gold

=== BWF World Tour (1 runner-up) ===
The BWF World Tour, which was announced on 19 March 2017 and implemented in 2018, is a series of elite badminton tournaments sanctioned by the Badminton World Federation (BWF). The BWF World Tour is divided into levels of World Tour Finals, Super 1000, Super 750, Super 500, Super 300 (part of the HSBC World Tour), and the BWF Tour Super 100.

Men's singles
Year	Tournament	Level	Opponent	Score	Result
2019	Chinese Taipei Open	Super 300	(Chinese Taipei) Chou Tien-chen	12–21, 13–21	(silver) Runner-up

=== BWF International Challenge/Series (1 runner-up) ===
Men's doubles
Year	Tournament	Opponent	Score	Result
2023	Thailand International	(Japan) Riki Takei	21–17, 20–22, 17–21	(silver) Runner-up

BWF International Challenge tournament
BWF International Series tournament
BWF Future Series tournament
