= 2012 Asian Junior Badminton Championships =

Tournament details
- Dates: 30 June - 7 July 2012
- Edition: 15
- Venue: Gimcheon Indoor Stadium
- Location: Gimcheon, South Korea

The 2012 Asian Junior Badminton Championships is an Asia continental junior championships to crown the best U-19 badminton players across Asia. It was held in Gimcheon Indoor Stadium, Gimcheon, South Korea from June 30 to July 7, 2012.

== Tournament ==
The 2013 Asian Junior Badminton Championships organized by the Gyeongbuk Badminton Association, Badminton Korea Association, and Badminton Asia Confederation. The motto of this tournament is "Peace of Asia through shuttlecock". This tournament consists of mixed team competition, which was held from 30 June–3 July, as well as five individual events started from 3–7 July. More than 250 athletes from 20 countries participated in this tournament.

=== Venue ===
This tournament was held at Gimcheon Indoor Stadium in Gimcheon, Gyeongbuk, South Korea.

== Medalists ==
In the mixed team event, Japan claimed the title for the first time after defeating China with the score 3–0. In the individuals event, South Korea ensured two titles after winning the mixed and girls' doubles event. Japan, India, and Indonesia seized a title each by winning the boys' singles, girls' singles and boys' doubles events respectively.

Event	Gold	Silver	Bronze
Teams	Japan; Takuto Inoue; Yuki Kaneko; Yugo Kobayashi; Akira Koga; Keiichiro Matsui; Koshun Miura; Kento Momota; Kenta Nishimoto; Saki Hayata; Chisato Hoshi; Mayu Nakamura; Aya Ohori; Nozomi Okuhara; Ayako Sakuramoto; Akane Watanabe; Akane Yamaguchi	China; Guo Kai; Liu Yuchen; Pei Tianyi; Shi Longfei; Shi Yuqi; Wang Yilu; Xue Song; Zhang Ningyi; Chen Shuyuan; Fan Mengyan; Huang Dongping; Huang Yaqiong; Shen Yaying; Sun Yu; Xiong Mengjing; Yu Xiaohan	South Korea; Bae Kwon-young; Choi Sol-gyu; Heo Kwang-hee; Jang Hyun-seok; Jeon Hyuk-jin; Jun Bong-chan; Jung Jae-wook; Park Se-woong; Chae Yoo-jung; Kim Hyo-min; Kim Ji-won; Lee Jang-mi; Lee Min-ji; Lee So-hee; Park So-young; Shin Seung-chan
Teams	Japan; Takuto Inoue; Yuki Kaneko; Yugo Kobayashi; Akira Koga; Keiichiro Matsui; Koshun Miura; Kento Momota; Kenta Nishimoto; Saki Hayata; Chisato Hoshi; Mayu Nakamura; Aya Ohori; Nozomi Okuhara; Ayako Sakuramoto; Akane Watanabe; Akane Yamaguchi	China; Guo Kai; Liu Yuchen; Pei Tianyi; Shi Longfei; Shi Yuqi; Wang Yilu; Xue Song; Zhang Ningyi; Chen Shuyuan; Fan Mengyan; Huang Dongping; Huang Yaqiong; Shen Yaying; Sun Yu; Xiong Mengjing; Yu Xiaohan	Malaysia; Cheam June Wei; Chong Yee Han; Darren Isaac Devadass; Calvin Jia Hong Ong; Soong Joo Ven; Tai An Khang; Tan Kian Meng; Tan Wee Gieen; Chin Kah Mun; Chow Mei Kuan; Lee Meng Yean; Lee Ying Ying; Lim Chiew Sien; Lim Yin Fun; Kisona Selvaduray; Ti Wei Chyi
Boys singles	(Japan) Kento Momota	(Malaysia) Soong Joo Ven	(Indonesia) Panji Akbar Sudrajat
Boys singles	(Japan) Kento Momota	(Malaysia) Soong Joo Ven	(India) Sameer Verma
Girls singles	(India) Pusarla Venkata Sindhu	(Japan) Nozomi Okuhara	(Thailand) Busanan Ongbumrungpan
Girls singles	(India) Pusarla Venkata Sindhu	(Japan) Nozomi Okuhara	(Japan) Akane Yamaguchi
Boys doubles	(Indonesia) Arya Maulana Aldiartama (Indonesia) Edi Subaktiar	(Chinese Taipei) Wang Chi-lin (Chinese Taipei) Wu Hsiao-lin	(Indonesia) Alfian Eko Prasetya (Indonesia) Kevin Sanjaya Sukamuljo
Boys doubles	(Indonesia) Arya Maulana Aldiartama (Indonesia) Edi Subaktiar	(Chinese Taipei) Wang Chi-lin (Chinese Taipei) Wu Hsiao-lin	(Hong Kong) Lee Chun Hei (Hong Kong) Ng Ka Long
Girls doubles	(South Korea) Lee So-hee (South Korea) Shin Seung-chan	(China) Yu Xiaohan (China) Huang Yaqiong	(China) Chen Qingchen (China) He Jiaxin
Girls doubles	(South Korea) Lee So-hee (South Korea) Shin Seung-chan	(China) Yu Xiaohan (China) Huang Yaqiong	(Malaysia) Chow Mei Kuan (Malaysia) Lee Meng Yean
Mixed doubles	(South Korea) Choi Sol-kyu (South Korea) Chae Yoo-jung	(China) Wang Yilu (China) Huang Dongping	(Vietnam) Do Tuan Duc (Vietnam) Le Thu Huyen
Mixed doubles	(South Korea) Choi Sol-kyu (South Korea) Chae Yoo-jung	(China) Wang Yilu (China) Huang Dongping	(China) Liu Yuchen (China) Chen Qingchen

== Medal table ==
Rank	Nation	Gold	Silver	Bronze	Total
1	Japan (JPN)	2	1	1	4
2	South Korea (KOR)	2	0	1	3
3	Indonesia (INA)	1	0	2	3
4	India (IND)	1	0	1	2
5	China (CHN)	0	3	2	5
6	Malaysia (MAS)	0	1	2	3
7	Chinese Taipei (TPE)	0	1	0	1
8	Hong Kong (HKG)	0	0	1	1
8	Thailand (THA)	0	0	1	1
8	Vietnam (VIE)	0	0	1	1
Totals (10 entries)		6	6	12	24
