= Kim Ji-won (badminton) =

South Korean badminton player (born 1995)

Personal information
- Born: 26 February 1995 (age 31)

Sport
- Country: South Korea
- Sport: Badminton

Women's & mixed doubles
- Highest ranking: 56 (WD 17 April 2014); 252 (XD 16 October 2014)
- BWF profile
Medal record
Women's badminton
Representing South Korea
East Asian Games
Bronze medal – third place	2013 Tianjin	Women's doubles
World Junior Championships
Gold medal – first place	2013 Bangkok	Girls' doubles
Gold medal – first place	2013 Bangkok	Mixed team
Bronze medal – third place	2012 Chiba	Mixed team
Asian Junior Championships
Silver medal – second place	2013 Kota Kinabalu	Mixed team
Bronze medal – third place	2013 Kota Kinabalu	Girls' doubles
Bronze medal – third place	2013 Kota Kinabalu	Mixed doubles
Bronze medal – third place	2012 Gimcheon	Mixed team

- Kim Ji-won
- Hangul: 김지원
- RR: Gim Jiwon
- MR: Kim Chiwŏn

Kim Ji-won (Korean: 김지원; born 26 February 1995) is a South Korean badminton player. Kim and her national teammates won the 2013 Suhadinata Cup after beating the Indonesian junior team in the final round of the mixed team event. She also won the World Junior Championships girls' doubles title partnered with Chae Yoo-jung.

== Achievements ==
=== East Asian Games ===
Women's doubles
Year	Venue	Partner	Opponent	Score	Result
2013	Binhai New Area Dagang Gymnasium; Tianjin, China	(South Korea) Chae Yoo-jung	(Japan) Yuriko Miki (Japan) Koharu Yonemoto	15–21, 18–21	Bronze

=== BWF World Junior Championships ===
Girls' doubles
Year	Venue	Partner	Opponent	Score	Result
2013	Hua Mark Indoor Stadium; Bangkok, Thailand	(South Korea) Chae Yoo-jung	(China) He Jiaxin (China) Chen Qingchen	21–19, 21–15	Gold

=== Asian Junior Championships ===
Girls' doubles
Year	Venue	Partner	Opponent	Score	Result
2013	Likas Indoor Stadium; Kota Kinabalu, Malaysia	(South Korea) Chae Yoo-jung	(China) Chen Qingchen (China) He Jiaxin	7–21, 21–19, 11–21	Bronze

Mixed doubles
Year	Venue	Partner	Opponent	Score	Result
2013	Likas Indoor Stadium; Kota Kinabalu, Malaysia	(South Korea) Kim Jung-ho	(China) Liu Yuchen (China) Huang Dongping	13–21, 16–21	Bronze

=== BWF International Challenge/Series ===
Women's doubles
Year	Tournament	Partner	Opponent	Score	Result
2015	Thailand International	(South Korea) Chae Yoo-jung	(Thailand) Duanganong Aroonkesorn (Thailand) Kunchala Voravichitchaikul	17–21, 19–21	(silver) Runner-up

BWF International Challenge tournament
BWF International Series tournament
BWF Future Series tournament
