= 2013 Asian Junior Badminton Championships =

Tournament details
- Dates: 7–14 July 2013
- Edition: 16
- Venue: Likas Indoor Stadium
- Location: Kota Kinabalu, Malaysia

The 2013 Asian Junior Badminton Championships is an Asia continental junior championships to crown the best U-19 badminton players across Asia. It was held in Kota Kinabalu, Malaysia from 7–14 July 2013.

== Tournament ==
The 2013 Asian Junior Badminton Championships organized by the Sabah Badminton Association, Badminton Association of Malaysia, and Badminton Asia Confederation. This tournament consists of mixed team competition, which was held from 7–10 July, as well as the five individual events started from 10–14 July.

=== Venue ===
This tournament was held at Likas Indoor Stadium in Kota Kinabalu, Sabah, Malaysia.

== Medalists ==
In the mixed team event, China claimed the title after defeating South Korea with the score 3–1. In the individuals event, China ensure two titles after won the men's and women's doubles event. Malaysia, Japan, and South Korea seize a title by winning the men's singles, women's singles and mixed doubles events respectively.

Event	Gold	Silver	Bronze
Teams	China; Huang Kaixiang; Li Junhui; Lin Guipu; Liu Yuchen; Shi Yuqi; Tao Jianqi; Zhao Junpeng; Zheng Siwei; Chen Qingchen; Chen Yufei; He Bingjiao; He Jiaxin; Huang Dongping; Jia Yifan; Qin Jinjing; Zhu Maici	South Korea; Choi Sol-kyu; Heo Kwang-hee; Jeon Hyeok-jin; Kim Jae-hwan; Kim Jung-ho; Lee Jun-su; Park Se-woong; Seo Seung-jae; Chae Yoo-jung; Jun Joo-i; Kim Hyo-min; Kim Ji-won; Kim Na-young; Lee Boon; Lee Min-ji; Lee Sun-min	Indonesia; Arya Maulana Aldiartama; Fajar Alfian; Fikri Ihsandi Hadmadi; Ihsan Maulana Mustofa; Rafiddias Akhdan Nugroho; Muhammad Bayu Pangisthu; Kevin Sanjaya Sukamuljo; Rian Swastedian; Fitriani; Ruselli Hartawan; Uswatun Khasanah; Masita Mahmudin; Setyana Mapasa; Rosyita Eka Putri Sari; Hanna Ramadini; Della Augustia Surya
Teams	China; Huang Kaixiang; Li Junhui; Lin Guipu; Liu Yuchen; Shi Yuqi; Tao Jianqi; Zhao Junpeng; Zheng Siwei; Chen Qingchen; Chen Yufei; He Bingjiao; He Jiaxin; Huang Dongping; Jia Yifan; Qin Jinjing; Zhu Maici	South Korea; Choi Sol-kyu; Heo Kwang-hee; Jeon Hyeok-jin; Kim Jae-hwan; Kim Jung-ho; Lee Jun-su; Park Se-woong; Seo Seung-jae; Chae Yoo-jung; Jun Joo-i; Kim Hyo-min; Kim Ji-won; Kim Na-young; Lee Boon; Lee Min-ji; Lee Sun-min	Japan; Takuro Hoki; Yu Igarashi; Takuto Inoue; Yugo Kobayashi; Kohei Matsumoto; Yusuke Onodera; Hashiru Shimono; Arisa Higashino; Chisato Hoshi; Aoi Matsuda; Mayu Matsumoto; Wakana Nagahara; Aya Ohori; Ayako Sakuramoto; Akane Yamaguchi
Boys singles	(Malaysia) Soo Teck Zhi	(South Korea) Jeon Hyuk-jin	(Thailand) Thammasin Sitthikom
Boys singles	(Malaysia) Soo Teck Zhi	(South Korea) Jeon Hyuk-jin	(Chinese Taipei) Wang Tzu-wei
Girls singles	(Japan) Aya Ohori	(Thailand) Busanan Ongbumrungpan	(China) He Bingjiao
Girls singles	(Japan) Aya Ohori	(Thailand) Busanan Ongbumrungpan	(China) Qin Jinjing
Boys doubles	(China) Li Junhui (China) Liu Yuchen	(China) Huang Kaixiang (China) Zheng Siwei	(Indonesia) Arya Maulana Aldiartama (Indonesia) Kevin Sanjaya Sukamuljo
Boys doubles	(China) Li Junhui (China) Liu Yuchen	(China) Huang Kaixiang (China) Zheng Siwei	(China) Tao Jianqi (China) Zhao Jian
Girls doubles	(China) Huang Dongping (China) Jia Yifan	(China) Chen Qingchen (China) He Jiaxin	(Thailand) Lam Narissapat (Thailand) Puttita Supajirakul
Girls doubles	(China) Huang Dongping (China) Jia Yifan	(China) Chen Qingchen (China) He Jiaxin	(South Korea) Chae Yoo-jung (South Korea) Kim Ji-won
Mixed doubles	(South Korea) Choi Sol-kyu (South Korea) Chae Yoo-jung	(China) Liu Yuchen (China) Huang Dongping	(China) Huang Kaixiang (China) Chen Qingchen
Mixed doubles	(South Korea) Choi Sol-kyu (South Korea) Chae Yoo-jung	(China) Liu Yuchen (China) Huang Dongping	(South Korea) Kim Jung-ho (South Korea) Kim Ji-won

== Medal table ==
Rank	Nation	Gold	Silver	Bronze	Total
1	China (CHN)	3	3	4	10
2	South Korea (KOR)	1	2	2	5
3	Japan (JPN)	1	0	1	2
4	Malaysia (MAS)	1	0	0	1
5	Thailand (THA)	0	1	2	3
6	Indonesia (INA)	0	0	2	2
7	Chinese Taipei (TPE)	0	0	1	1
Totals (7 entries)		6	6	12	24
