= 2013 BWF World Junior Championships =

Tournament details
- Dates: October 23, 2013 - November 3, 2013
- Edition: 15th
- Level: International
- Venue: Hua Mark Indoor Stadium
- Location: Bangkok, Thailand

The 2013 BWF World Junior Championships were held in Bangkok, Thailand from October 23 to November 3, 2013.

== Medalists ==
Event	Gold	Silver	Bronze
Teams	South Korea; Choi Jong-woo; Choi Sol-gyu; Heo Kwang-hee; Jeon Hyuk-jin; Kim Jae-hwan; Kim Jung-ho; Lee Jun-su; Seo Seung-jae; Chae Yoo-jung; Jun Joo-i; Kim Hye-rin; Kim Hyo-min; Kim Ji-won; Kim Na-young; Kong Hee-yong; Lee Sun-min	Indonesia; Arya Maulana Aldiartama; Fajar Alfian; Jonatan Christie; Fikri Ihsandi Hadmadi; Alwi Mahardika; Ihsan Maulana Mustofa; Rafiddias Akhdan Nugroho; Muhammad Bayu Pangisthu; Yantoni Edy Saputra; Kevin Sanjaya Sukamuljo; Fitriani; Setyana Mapasa; Ruselli Hartawan; Intan Dwi Jayanti; Uswatun Khasanah; Febriani Endar Kusumawati; Masita Mahmudin; Rosyita Eka Putri Sari; Hanna Ramadini; Della Augustia Surya	China; Huang Kaixiang; Li Junhui; Lin Guipu; Liu Yuchen; Shi Yuqi; Sun Feixiang; Tao Jianqi; Zhao Jian; Zhao Junpeng; Zheng Siwei; Chen Qingchen; Chen Yufei; He Bingjiao; He Jiaxin; Huang Dongping; Jia Yifan; Li Yinhui; Qin Jinjing; Wang Xinyuan; Zhu Maici
Boys singles	(South Korea) Heo Kwang-hee	(Chinese Taipei) Wang Tzu-wei	(Indonesia) Ihsan Maulana Mustofa
Boys singles	(South Korea) Heo Kwang-hee	(Chinese Taipei) Wang Tzu-wei	(China) Zhao Junpeng
Girls singles	(Japan) Akane Yamaguchi	(Japan) Aya Ohori	(China) He Bingjiao
Girls singles	(Japan) Akane Yamaguchi	(Japan) Aya Ohori	(Thailand) Busanan Ongbumrungpan
Boys doubles	(China) Li Junhui (China) Liu Yuchen	(China) Huang Kaixiang (China) Zheng Siwei	(Chinese Taipei) Tien Tzu-chieh (Chinese Taipei) Wang Chi-lin
Boys doubles	(China) Li Junhui (China) Liu Yuchen	(China) Huang Kaixiang (China) Zheng Siwei	(South Korea) Choi Jong-woo (South Korea) Seo Seung-jae
Girls doubles	(South Korea) Chae Yoo-jung (South Korea) Kim Ji-won	(China) Chen Qingchen (China) He Jiaxin	(China) Huang Dongping (China) Jia Yifan
Girls doubles	(South Korea) Chae Yoo-jung (South Korea) Kim Ji-won	(China) Chen Qingchen (China) He Jiaxin	(Thailand) Lam Narissapat (Thailand) Puttita Supajirakul
Mixed doubles	(China) Huang Kaixiang (China) Chen Qingchen	(Indonesia) Kevin Sanjaya Sukamuljo (Indonesia) Masita Mahmudin	(South Korea) Choi Sol-gyu (South Korea) Chae Yoo-jung
Mixed doubles	(China) Huang Kaixiang (China) Chen Qingchen	(Indonesia) Kevin Sanjaya Sukamuljo (Indonesia) Masita Mahmudin	(China) Liu Yuchen (China) Huang Dongping

== Medal table ==
Rank	Nation	Gold	Silver	Bronze	Total
1	South Korea (KOR)	3	0	2	5
2	China (CHN)	2	2	5	9
3	Japan (JPN)	1	1	0	2
4	Indonesia (INA)	0	2	1	3
5	Chinese Taipei (TPE)	0	1	1	2
6	Thailand (THA)	0	0	2	2
Totals (6 entries)		6	6	11	23
