= He Jiaxin =

Chinese badminton player (born 1996)

He Jiaxin 何嘉欣
Personal information
- Born: 5 March 1996 (age 30) Guangdong, China
- Height: 1.63 m (5 ft 4 in)

Sport
- Country: China
- Sport: Badminton

Women's Doubles & Mixed Doubles
- Highest ranking: 208 (WD) 31 Oct 2013; 917 (XD) 24 Oct 2013
- BWF profile
Medal record
Women's badminton
Representing China
East Asian Games
Gold medal – first place	2013 Tianjin	Women's team
World Junior Championships
Silver medal – second place	2013 Bangkok	Girls' doubles
Bronze medal – third place	2013 Bangkok	Mixed team
Asia Junior Championships
Gold medal – first place	2013 Kota Kinabalu	Mixed team
Silver medal – second place	2013 Kota Kinabalu	Girls' doubles
Silver medal – second place	2012 Gimcheon	Mixed team
Bronze medal – third place	2012 Gimcheon	Girls' doubles

He Jiaxin (Chinese: 何嘉欣, born 5 March 1996) is a Chinese female badminton player.

== Achievements ==
=== BWF World Junior Championships ===
Girls' Doubles
Year	Venue	Partner	Opponent	Score	Result
2013	Hua Mark Indoor Stadium; Bangkok, Thailand	(China) Chen Qingchen	(South Korea) Chae Yoo-jung (South Korea) Kim Ji-won	19-21, 15-21	Silver

=== Asia Junior Championships ===
Girls' Doubles
Year	Venue	Partner	Opponent	Score	Result
2013	Likas Indoor Stadium; Kota Kinabalu, Malaysia	(China) Chen Qingchen	(China) Huang Dongping (China) Jia Yifan	21-19, 21-16	Silver
2012	Gimcheon Indoor Stadium; Gimcheon, South Korea	(China) Chen Qingchen	(China) Yu Xiaohan (China) Huang Yaqiong	21-23, 10-21	Bronze
