= Meghana Jakkampudi =

Indian badminton player (born 1995)

Personal information
- Born: 28 December 1995 (age 30) Vijayawada, Andhra Pradesh, India

Sport
- Country: India
- Sport: Badminton
- Handedness: Right
- Coached by: Pullela Gopichand

Women's & mixed doubles
- Highest ranking: 30 (WD 22 November 2018); 84 (XD 23 March 2021)
- Current ranking: 43 (WD), 84 (XD) (23 March 2021)
- BWF profile
Medal record
Women's badminton
Representing India
South Asian Games
Gold medal – first place	2019 Kathmandu–Pokhara	Mixed doubles
Gold medal – first place	2019 Kathmandu–Pokhara	Women's team
Bronze medal – third place	2019 Kathmandu–Pokhara	Women's doubles

Meghana Jakkampudi (born 28 December 1995) is an Indian badminton player. She was the gold medalists at the 2019 South Asian Games in the mixed doubles and team events, also won the bronze medal in the women's doubles.

== Achievements ==
=== South Asian Games ===
Women's doubles
Year	Venue	Partner	Opponent	Score	Result
2019	Badminton Covered Hall; Pokhara, Nepal	(India) N. Sikki Reddy	(Sri Lanka) Thilini Hendahewa (Sri Lanka) Kavidi Sirimannage	14–21, 18–21	Bronze

Mixed doubles
Year	Venue	Partner	Opponent	Score	Result
2019	Badminton Covered Hall; Pokhara, Nepal	(India) Dhruv Kapila	(Sri Lanka) Sachin Dias (Sri Lanka) Thilini Hendahewa	21–16, 21–14	Gold

=== BWF International Challenge/Series (3 titles, 3 runners-up) ===
Women's doubles
Year	Tournament	Partner	Opponent	Score	Result
2014	Tata Open India International	(India) K. Maneesha	(India) Aparna Balan (India) Prajakta Sawant	13–21, 21–10, 13–21	(silver) Runner-up
2016	Bangladesh International	(India) Poorvisha S. Ram	(Vietnam) Nguyễn Thị Sen (Vietnam) Vũ Thị Trang	6–21, 22–20, 11–21	(silver) Runner-up
2016	Nepal International	(India) Poorvisha S. Ram	(India) Anoushka Parikh (India) Harika Veludurthi	21–16, 21–12	(gold) Winner
2018	Tata Open India International	(India) Poorvisha S. Ram	(Hong Kong) Ng Wing Yung (Hong Kong) Yeung Nga Ting	10–21, 11–21	(silver) Runner-up
2020	Uganda International	(India) Poorvisha S. Ram	(Peru) Daniela Macías (Peru) Dánica Nishimura	21–17, 20–22, 21–14	(gold) Winner

Mixed doubles
Year	Tournament	Partner	Opponent	Score	Result
2020	Uganda International	(India) Tarun Kona	(India) Shivam Sharma (India) Poorvisha S. Ram	21–7, 14–21, 21–16	(gold) Winner

BWF International Challenge tournament
BWF International Series tournament
BWF Future Series tournament
