= Poorvisha S. Ram =

Indian badminton player

Personal information
- Born: 24 January 1995 (age 31) Bangalore, Karnataka, India
- Years active: 2008–present

Sport
- Country: India
- Sport: Badminton
- Handedness: Right

Women's & mixed doubles
- Highest ranking: 30 (WD with Meghana Jakkampudi 15 November 2018); 85 (XD with Nithin H. V. 24 January 2023)
- Current ranking: 258 (WD), 85 (XD) (24 January 2023)
- BWF profile
Medal record
Women's badminton
Representing India
Asian Junior Championships
Bronze medal – third place	2011 Lucknow	Mixed team

Poorvisha S. Ram (born 24 January 1995) is an Indian badminton player who specializes in doubles and mixed doubles. As of February 2020, she is ranked 48 in doubles. She had attained career best ranking of 30 in November 2018. She was previously ranked 3 in doubles at national level.

== Biography ==
Poorvisha was born in 1995, in Bangalore, Karnataka. She completed her early education at Sishu Griha Montessori and High School, in Bangalore. Poorvisha started playing badminton in 2005 and represented Karnataka at national level in 2007. She won her first competitive tournament at the age of 13 in 2008 when she won a national level inter-school tournament.

In 2009, Poorvisha won silver medal at the 35th National Sports Festival for Women at Margao, Goa. She has won the national championship in junior circuit consecutively for three years in 2010, 2011 and 2012. In December 2012, Poorvisha represented India at Li-Ning Singapore Youth International Series and won silver medal in the women's double event.

Initially, Poorvisha trained at B. N. Sudhakar Academy in Bangalore but moved to Hyderabad in 2013 where she trained under Pullela Gopichand at Gopichand Badminton Academy, Hyderabad. Currently, she trains under Arun Vishnu and Pradnya Gadre along with Gopichand.

Poorvisha won her first senior title in 2015 at Uganda International double event with N. Sikki Reddy. Later that year, she won Bahrain International with Arathi Sara Sunil. In late 2015, Poorvisha was out for sixteen weeks due to career ending lateral and medical epicondylitis, however, she recovered and made a come back in early 2016.

In 2016, Poorvisha partnered with Meghana Jakkampudi and won Nepal International in Kathmandu. Since 2016, Poorvisha has spent her double career in partnership with Jakkampudi whereas in mixed doubles, she partners with Krishna Prasad Ganga. In 2017, Poorvisha and Jakkampudi appeared in various international competitions including 2017 Syed Modi International Grand Prix Gold and 2017 All England Super Series Premier. They reached the finals of Tata Open India International in 2018. In 2019, the pair appeared in Russian Open semifinals where they lost to Japanese pair of Miki Kashihara and Miyuki Kato.

== Achievements ==
=== BWF International Challenge/Series (5 titles, 3 runners-up) ===
Women's doubles
Year	Tournament	Partner	Opponent	Score	Result
2015	Uganda International	(India) N. Sikki Reddy	(Iran) Sorayya Aghaei (Iran) Negin Amiripour	11–7, 6–11, 8–11, 11–7, 11–3	(gold) Winner
2015	Bahrain International	(India) Arathi Sara Sunil	(Pakistan) Palwasha Bashir (Pakistan) Sara Mohmand	21–14, 21–8	(gold) Winner
2016	Bangladesh International	(India) Meghana Jakkampudi	(Vietnam) Nguyễn Thị Sen (Vietnam) Vũ Thị Trang	6–21, 22–20, 11–21	(silver) Runner-up
2016	Nepal International	(India) Meghana Jakkampudi	(India) Anoushka Parikh (India) Harika Veludurthi	21–16, 21–12	(gold) Winner
2018	Tata Open India International	(India) Meghana Jakkampudi	(Hong Kong) Ng Wing Yung (Hong Kong) Yeung Nga Ting	10–21, 11–21	(silver) Runner-up
2020	Uganda International	(India) Meghana Jakkampudi	(Peru) Daniela Macías (Peru) Dánica Nishimura	21–17, 20–22, 21–14	(gold) Winner
2022	Cameroon International	(India) Srivedya Gurazada	(Malaysia) Kasturi Radhakrishnan (Malaysia) Venosha Radhakrishnan	21–12, 21–14	(gold) Winner

Mixed doubles
Year	Tournament	Partner	Opponent	Score	Result
2020	Uganda International	(India) Shivam Sharma	(India) Tarun Kona (India) Meghana Jakkampudi	7–21, 21–14, 16–21	(silver) Runner-up

BWF International Challenge tournament
BWF International Series tournament
BWF Future Series tournament
