= Ayako Sakuramoto =

Japanese badminton player (born 1995)

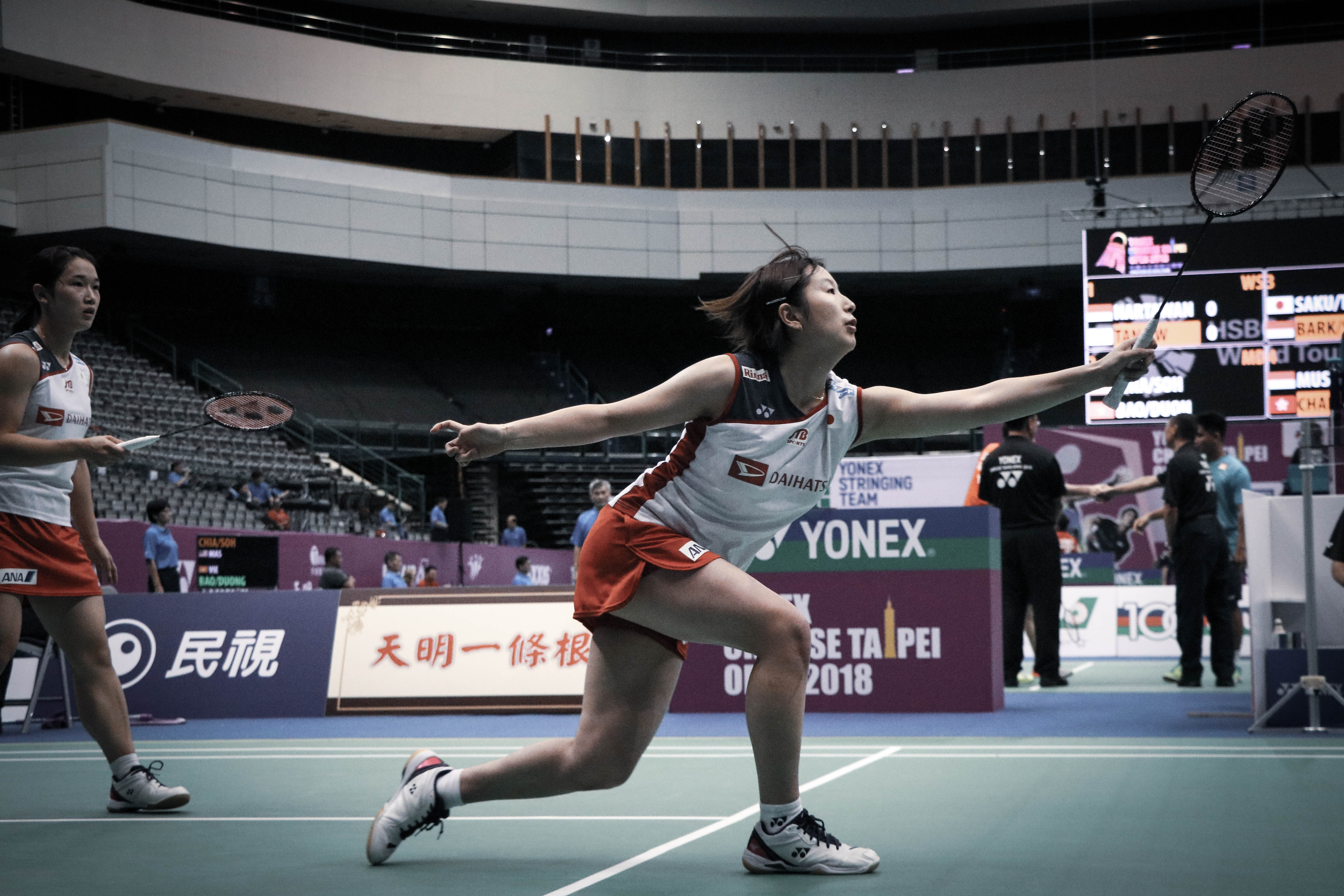

Personal information
- Born: August 19, 1995 (age 31) Fukuoka Prefecture, Japan
- Height: 1.66 m (5 ft 5 in)

Sport
- Country: Japan
- Sport: Badminton
- Handedness: Left
- Coached by: Akihiro Imai; Keiko Yoshitomi

Women's doubles
- Highest ranking: 9 (with Yukiko Takahata, 5 February 2019)
- Current ranking: 15 (with Sayaka Hirota, 17 November 2026)
- BWF profile
Medal record
Women's badminton
Representing Japan
Uber Cup
Bronze medal – third place	2024 Chengdu	Women's team
Asia Mixed Team Championships
Silver medal – second place	2019 Hong Kong	Mixed team
Bronze medal – third place	2025 Qingdao	Mixed team
Asia Team Championships
Bronze medal – third place	2024 Selangor	Women's team
World Junior Championships
Silver medal – second place	2012 Chiba	Mixed team
Asia Junior Championships
Gold medal – first place	2012 Gimcheon	Mixed team
Bronze medal – third place	2011 Lucknow	Girls' doubles
Bronze medal – third place	2013 Kota Kinabalu	Mixed team

Ayako Sakuramoto (櫻本 絢子, Sakuramoto Ayako; born August 19, 1995) is a Japanese badminton player. She currently plays for Gifu Bluvic, having previously spent over a decade as a member of the Yonex team. She specializes in women's doubles and has achieved success in numerous tournaments. These include the Asian Junior Championships, BWF World Tour, BWF Grand Prix, and BWF International Challenge/Series. Sakuramoto frequently partners with Yukiko Takahata and Rena Miyaura, with whom she has won multiple titles and medals.

== Career ==
Sakuramoto who educated at the Kyushu International University High School, won the girls' doubles bronze medal at the 2011 Asian Junior Badminton Championships. She also won 2012 gold and 2013 bronze in the mixed team event. In 2017, she became the women's doubles runner-up at the Osaka International tournament partnered with Yukiko Takahata. She won her first senior international title at the Spanish International tournament with Takahata.

=== 2021–2022 ===
In 2021, Sakuramoto formed a partnership with Mayu Matsumoto, reaching the quarter-finals of the Indonesia Open. In April 2022, partnering with Hinata Suzuki, she was the runner-up at the Mexican International, losing a three-game final to compatriots Rui Hirokami and Yuna Kato. Later that year, she formed a new partnership with Rena Miyaura. The pair won the Canada Open in September, defeating Hirokami and Kato in straight games. In October, they reached the final of the Indonesia Masters Super 100, finishing as runners-up to Hirokami and Kato.

=== 2023 ===
Continuing her partnership with Miyaura, Sakuramoto helped Japan reach the quarter-finals of the Asia Mixed Team Championships. On the World Tour, the duo claimed two Super 300 titles: the Swiss Open in March, following a walkover in the final against Yuki Yuki Fukushima and Sayaka Hirota, and the Orléans Masters in April by defeating Liu Shengshu and Tan Ning. The pair also reached the semi-finals at the Australian Open, China Open, and Japan Masters.

=== 2024 ===
Sakuramoto and Miyaura advanced to the semi-finals of the All England Open, after defeating the Malaysian pair of Pearly Tan and Thinaah Muralitharan in the quarter-finals. In team events, Sakuramoto helped the Japanese women's squad win bronze medals at both the Asia Team Championships in February and the Uber Cup in April. Towards the end of the year, she formed a new partnership with Arisa Igarashi, reaching the second round at both the Japan Masters and the China Masters.

=== 2025 ===
Sakuramoto and Igarashi won the India Open in January, defeating Kim Hye-jeong and Kong Hee-yong after having played together for four and a half months. In February, she contributed to Japan's bronze medal at the Asia Mixed Team Championships in Qingdao. Later that year, Sakuramoto partnered with Mei Sudo, reaching the semi-finals at the Thailand International Series and the Thailand International Challenge in August.

=== 2026 ===
Sakuramoto began competing with Sayaka Hirota, and the pair reached the quarter-finals of the All England Open in March. On April 1, Sakuramoto transferred to the Gifu Bluvic badminton team, concluding a 12-year tenure with Yonex. She cited the opportunity to partner with Hirota as her primary motivation for the move. Later in the year, the duo advanced to the final of the Super 500 Malaysia Masters, where they finished as runners-up to Chen Fanshutian and Luo Xumin. In September, Sakuramoto and Hirota reached the semi-finals of the China Masters, where they were defeated by eventual champions Sumire Nakade and Miyu Takahashi in three games.

In October, Sakuramoto and Hirota reached the quarter-finals of the Arctic Open, where they lost to the eventual champions Chen Fanshutian and Luo Xumin. During the tournament, Sakuramoto topped the Badminton World Federation's women's doubles SuperSmash leaderboard with a recorded smash speed of 467.5 km/h, surpassing the female Guinness World Records mark of 438 km/h for the fastest badminton hit.

== Achievements ==
=== Asian Junior Championships ===
Girls' doubles
Year	Venue	Partner	Opponent	Score	Result	Ref.
2011	Babu Banarasi Das Indoor Stadium; Lucknow, India	(Japan) Ayano Torii	(Indonesia) Suci Rizky Andini (Indonesia) Tiara Rosalia Nuraidah	15–21, 15–21	Bronze	

=== BWF World Tour (12 titles, 3 runners-up) ===
The BWF World Tour, which was announced on March 19, 2017 and implemented in 2018, is a series of elite badminton tournaments sanctioned by the Badminton World Federation (BWF). The BWF World Tour is divided into levels of World Tour Finals, Super 1000, Super 750, Super 500, Super 300, and the BWF Tour Super 100.

Women's doubles
Year	Tournament	Level	Partner	Opponent	Score	Result	Ref.
2018	Swiss Open	Super 300	(Japan) Yukiko Takahata	(Bulgaria) Gabriela Stoeva (Bulgaria) Stefani Stoeva	19–21, 21–15, 21–18	(gold) Winner	
2018	New Zealand Open	Super 300	(Japan) Yukiko Takahata	(China) Cao Tongwei (China) Zheng Yu	21–9, 21–19	(gold) Winner	
2018	Australian Open	Super 300	(Japan) Yukiko Takahata	(South Korea) Baek Ha-na (South Korea) Lee Yu-lim	23–21, 21–18	(gold) Winner	
2018	Canada Open	Super 100	(Japan) Yukiko Takahata	(Germany) Isabel Herttrich (Germany) Carla Nelte	21–13, 21–15	(gold) Winner	
2018	Singapore Open	Super 500	(Japan) Yukiko Takahata	(Japan) Nami Matsuyama (Japan) Chiharu Shida	16–21, 24–22, 21–13	(gold) Winner	
2018	Akita Masters	Super 100	(Japan) Yukiko Takahata	(Japan) Nami Matsuyama (Japan) Chiharu Shida	23–21, 21–11	(gold) Winner	
2018	Spain Masters	Super 300	(Japan) Yukiko Takahata	(Japan) Mayu Matsumoto (Japan) Wakana Nagahara	17–21, 13–21	(silver) Runner-up	
2018	Indonesia Masters	Super 100	(Japan) Yukiko Takahata	(Japan) Nami Matsuyama (Japan) Chiharu Shida	11–21, 21–19, 22–20	(gold) Winner	
2019	Akita Masters	Super 100	(Japan) Yukiko Takahata	(Indonesia) Nita Violina Marwah (Indonesia) Putri Syaikah	21–17, 14–21, 21–15	(gold) Winner	
2022	Canada Open	Super 100	(Japan) Rena Miyaura	(Japan) Rui Hirokami (Japan) Yuna Kato	21–13, 21–8	(gold) Winner	
2022	Indonesia Masters	Super 100	(Japan) Rena Miyaura	(Japan) Rui Hirokami (Japan) Yuna Kato	21–23, 18–21	(silver) Runner-up	
2023	Swiss Open	Super 300	(Japan) Rena Miyaura	(Japan) Yuki Fukushima (Japan) Sayaka Hirota	Walkover	(gold) Winner	
2023	Orléans Masters	Super 300	(Japan) Rena Miyaura	(China) Liu Shengshu (China) Tan Ning	21–19, 16–21, 21–12	(gold) Winner	
2025	India Open	Super 750	(Japan) Arisa Igarashi	(South Korea) Kim Hye-jeong (South Korea) Kong Hee-yong	21–15, 21–13	(gold) Winner	
2026	Malaysia Masters	Super 500	(Japan) Sayaka Hirota	(China) Chen Fanshutian (China) Luo Xumin	16–21, 23–25	(silver) Runner-up	

=== BWF Grand Prix (1 runner-up) ===
The BWF Grand Prix had two levels, the Grand Prix and Grand Prix Gold. It was a series of badminton tournaments sanctioned by the Badminton World Federation (BWF) and played between 2007 and 2017.

Women's doubles
Year	Tournament	Partner	Opponent	Score	Result	Ref.
2017	New Zealand Open	(Japan) Yukiko Takahata	(Malaysia) Vivian Hoo (Malaysia) Woon Khe Wei	21–18, 16–21, 19–21	(silver) Runner-up	

BWF Grand Prix Gold tournament

=== BWF International Challenge/Series (1 title, 3 runners-up) ===
Women's doubles
Year	Tournament	Partner	Opponent	Score	Result	Ref.
2017	Osaka International	(Japan) Yukiko Takahata	(South Korea) Kim So-yeong (South Korea) Yoo Hae-won	21–16, 17–21, 19–21	(silver) Runner-up	
2017	Spanish International	(Japan) Yukiko Takahata	(Japan) Misato Aratama (Japan) Akane Watanabe	21–10, 21–15	(gold) Winner	
2018	Osaka International	(Japan) Yukiko Takahata	(Japan) Naoko Fukuman (Japan) Kurumi Yonao	21–17, 19–21, 16–21	(silver) Runner-up	
2022	Mexican International	(Japan) Hinata Suzuki	(Japan) Rui Hirokami (Japan) Yuna Kato	21–15, 19–21, 17–21	(silver) Runner-up	

BWF International Challenge tournament
