= Chisato Hoshi =

Japanese badminton player (born 1995)

Personal information
- Born: 26 September 1995 (age 31) Hakusan, Ishikawa, Japan
- Height: 1.63 m (5 ft 4 in)

Sport
- Country: Japan
- Sport: Badminton
- Handedness: Right
- Retired: 31 March 2023

Women's singles & doubles
- Highest ranking: 27 (WD with Naru Shinoya, 26 October 2017); 95 (WS, 23 March 2017)
- BWF profile
Medal record
Women's badminton
Representing Japan
World Junior Championships
| Silver medal – second place | 2012 Chiba | Mixed team |
Asian Junior Championships
| Gold medal – first place | 2012 Gimcheon | Mixed team |
| Bronze medal – third place | 2013 Kota Kinabalu | Mixed team |

Chisato Hoshi (星 千智, Hoshi Chisato; born 26 September 1995) is a retired Japanese badminton player who played for the BIPROGY (formerly Unisys) team. A women's doubles specialist, Hoshi won two BWF World Tour titles. She won her first World Tour title at the 2018 Russian Open Super 100 with her partner Kie Nakanishi. Her highest-level title came in 2021, when she partnered with Aoi Matsuda to win the Super 500 title at the Hylo Open. Hoshi also reached the final of the 2017 Canada Open, a BWF Grand Prix tournament. She won eight titles on the BWF International Challenge/Series circuit. Hoshi officially retired from the sport on 31 March 2023.

== Career ==
=== Junior career ===
Hoshi represented Japan in junior team competitions, winning a silver medal in the mixed team event at the 2012 BWF World Junior Championships. She also won bronze medals in the mixed team event at the 2012 and 2013 Asian Junior Championships.

=== Senior career ===
Hoshi competed in women's singles and doubles on the BWF circuit. Early in her senior career, she focused primarily on singles and achieved three runner-up finishes in BWF International Challenge/Series events: the 2014 Polish Open, the 2016 Brazil International, and the 2017 Portugal International.

Partnering with Naru Shinoya in women's doubles, Hoshi won three International Challenge titles: the Peru International and Brazil International in 2016, followed by the Portugal International in 2017. In 2017, the pair also reached the final of the BWF Grand Prix Canada Open but finished as runners-up to their compatriots, Mayu Matsumoto and Wakana Nagahara. Additionally, they were finalists at the 2017 Finnish Open and the Smiling Fish International. These achievements led to Hoshi achieving her highest women's doubles ranking of No. 27, on 26 October 2017.

With the introduction of the BWF World Tour in 2018, Hoshi formed a new partnership with Kie Nakanishi. They won the Austrian International and secured their first World Tour title at the Super 100 Russian Open that year. In 2019, Hoshi partnered with Aoi Matsuda and won the Polish Open. Their highest-level title together was the 2021 Hylo Open, a Super 500 tournament. On their path to the title, they defeated the top-seeded Thai pair Jongkolphan Kititharakul and Rawinda Prajongjai in the semifinals before overcoming Japanese compatriots Rin Iwanaga and Kie Nakanishi in the final.

In 2022, Hoshi partnered with Miyu Takahashi, winning three consecutive International Challenge titles: the India International (I), the India International (II), and the Maldives International. Hoshi officially retired from professional badminton on 31 March 2023, with BIPROGY announcing her retirement on 3 April 2023.

== Achievements ==
=== BWF World Tour (2 titles) ===
The BWF World Tour, which was announced on 19 March 2017 and implemented in 2018, is a series of elite badminton tournaments sanctioned by the Badminton World Federation (BWF). The BWF World Tours are divided into levels of World Tour Finals, Super 1000, Super 750, Super 500, Super 300 (part of the HSBC World Tour), and the BWF Tour Super 100.

Women's doubles
| Year | Tournament | Level | Partner | Opponent | Score | Result | Ref. |
|---|---|---|---|---|---|---|---|
| 2018 | Russian Open | Super 100 | (Japan) Kie Nakanishi | (Malaysia) Chow Mei Kuan (Malaysia) Lee Meng Yean | 21–11, 21–18 | (gold) Winner | |
| 2021 | Hylo Open | Super 500 | (Japan) Aoi Matsuda | (Japan) Rin Iwanaga (Japan) Kie Nakanishi | 22–20, 21–18 | (gold) Winner | |

=== BWF Grand Prix (1 runner-up) ===
The BWF Grand Prix had two levels, the Grand Prix and Grand Prix Gold. It was a series of badminton tournaments sanctioned by the Badminton World Federation (BWF) and played between 2007 and 2017.

Women's doubles
| Year | Tournament | Partner | Opponent | Score | Result | Ref. |
|---|---|---|---|---|---|---|
| 2017 | Canada Open | (Japan) Naru Shinoya | (Japan) Mayu Matsumoto (Japan) Wakana Nagahara | 16–21, 21–16, 18–21 | (silver) Runner-up | |

BWF Grand Prix tournament

=== BWF International Challenge/Series (8 titles, 5 runners-up) ===
Women's singles
| Year | Tournament | Opponent | Score | Result | Ref. |
|---|---|---|---|---|---|
| 2014 | Polish Open | (Japan) Yuka Kusunose | 13–21, 18–21 | (silver) Runner-up | |
| 2016 | Brazil International | (Turkey) Neslihan Yiğit | 13–21, 15–21 | (silver) Runner-up | |
| 2017 | Portugal International | (Japan) Sayaka Takahashi | 10–21, 15–21 | (silver) Runner-up | |

Women's doubles
| Year | Tournament | Partner | Opponent | Score | Result | Ref. |
|---|---|---|---|---|---|---|
| 2016 | Peru International | (Japan) Naru Shinoya | (Turkey) Cemre Fere (Turkey) Ebru Yazgan | 21–5, 21–7 | (gold) Winner | |
| 2016 | Brazil International | (Japan) Naru Shinoya | (Australia) Setyana Mapasa (Australia) Gronya Somerville | 21–13, 21–19 | (gold) Winner | |
| 2017 | Portugal International | (Japan) Naru Shinoya | (Denmark) Emilie Juul Møller (Denmark) Mai Surrow | 21–13, 21–6 | (gold) Winner | |
| 2017 | Finnish Open | (Japan) Naru Shinoya | (Japan) Misato Aratama (Japan) Akane Watanabe | 18–21, 13–21 | (silver) Runner-up | |
| 2017 | Smiling Fish International | (Japan) Naru Shinoya | (Japan) Nami Matsuyama (Japan) Chiharu Shida | 19–21, 14–21 | (silver) Runner-up | |
| 2018 | Austrian International | (Japan) Kie Nakanishi | (Japan) Sayaka Hobara (Japan) Natsuki Sone | 21–15, 21–18 | (gold) Winner | |
| 2019 | Polish Open | (Japan) Aoi Matsuda | (Denmark) Alexandra Bøje (Denmark) Mette Poulsen | 21–18, 15–21, 21–17 | (gold) Winner | |
| 2022 (I) | India International | (Japan) Miyu Takahashi | (Japan) Miho Kayama (Japan) Kaho Osawa | 21–18, 19–21, 21–16 | (gold) Winner | |
| 2022 (II) | India International | (Japan) Miyu Takahashi | (India) Pooja Dandu (India) Arathi Sara Sunil | 12–21, 21–12, 21–7 | (gold) Winner | |
| 2022 | Maldives International | (Japan) Miyu Takahashi | (Japan) Kaho Osawa (Japan) Kaoru Sugiyama | 21–16, 21–15 | (gold) Winner | |

BWF International Challenge tournament
BWF International Series tournament
