= 2012 Asian Junior Badminton Championships – Mixed doubles =

Tournament details
- Dates: 3 – 7 July 2012
- Edition: 15
- Venue: Gimcheon Indoor Stadium
- Location: Gimcheon, South Korea

The Mixed doubles tournament of the 2012 Asian Junior Badminton Championships was held from July 3–7 in Gimcheon, South Korea. The gold medalist in the last edition were Lukhi Apri Nugroho and Ririn Amelia from Indonesia. The top seeded Edi Subaktiar / Melati Daeva Oktavianti from Indonesia beaten by Chinese pair, eventual silver medalist Wang Yilyu / Huang Dongping in the quarterfinals round. Vietnamese and Chinese pairs Do Tuan Duc / Le Thu Huyen and Liu Yuchen / Chen Qingchen finished in the semifinals round, settle for the bronze medal. Host players, the second seeded Choi Sol-gyu / Chae Yoo-jung emerged as the champion after beat Wang / Huang of China in the finals with the rubber games 17–21, 25–23, 23–21.

== Seeded ==
1. (Indonesia) Edi Subaktiar / Melati Daeva Oktavianti (quarter-final)
2. (South Korea) Choi Sol-gyu / Chae Yoo-jung (champion)
3. (Malaysia) Tan Wee Gieen / Chow Mei Kuan (quarter-final)
4. (Japan) Koshun Miura / Akane Watanabe (second round)
5. (Indonesia) Alfian Eko Prasetya / Shella Devi Aulia (third round)
6. (Indonesia) Hafiz Faizal / Maretha Dea Giovani (second round)
7. (South Korea) Jun Bong-chan / Lee So-hee (third round)
8. (Indonesia) Putra Eka Rhoma / Ni Ketut Mahadewi Istirani (third round)

== Draw ==
=== Finals ===
Quarterfinals
1	(Indonesia) Edi Subaktiar (Indonesia) Melati Daeva Oktavianti	13	16
(China) Wang Yilyu (China) Huang Dongping	21	21
3	(Malaysia) Tan Wee Gieen (Malaysia) Chow Mei Kuan	21	24	17
(Vietnam) Do Tuan Duc (Vietnam) Le Thu Huyen	12	26	21
(South Korea) Bae Kwon-young (South Korea) Shin Seung-chan	18	16
(China) Liu Yuchen (China) Chen Qingchen	21	21
(South Korea) Park Se-woong (South Korea) Kim Ji-won	22	11	16
2	(South Korea) Choi Sol-gyu (South Korea) Chae Yoo-jung	20	21	21

Semifinals
(China) Wang Yilyu (China) Huang Dongping	21	21
(Vietnam) Do Tuan Duc (Vietnam) Le Thu Huyen	9	18
(China) Liu Yuchen (China) Chen Qingchen	17	19
2	(South Korea) Choi Sol-gyu (South Korea) Chae Yoo-jung	21	21

Final
(China) Wang Yilyu (China) Huang Dongping	21	23	21
2	(South Korea) Choi Sol-gyu (South Korea) Chae Yoo-jung	17	25	23

=== Top Half ===
==== Section 1 ====
First round
(India) B Venkatesh (India) R S Gadde	13	21
(Chinese Taipei) Wang C-l (Chinese Taipei) Chen S-y	21	21
(Singapore) L Teng (Singapore) E Chua	21	21	15
(Hong Kong) Law C H (Hong Kong) Cheung Y M	19	23	21

Second round
1	(Indonesia) E Subaktiar (Indonesia) M D Oktavianti	21	21
(Chinese Taipei) Wang C-l (Chinese Taipei) Chen S-y	17	19
(Thailand) T Sitthikom (Thailand) N Lam	21	21
(Hong Kong) Law C H (Hong Kong) Cheung Y M	5	9

Third round
1	(Indonesia) E Subaktiar (Indonesia) M D Oktavianti	21	21
(Thailand) T Sittikhom (Thailand) N Lam	18	16

==== Section 2 ====
First round
(Japan) T Inoue (Japan) A Sakuramoto	21	21
(Sri Lanka) K R Halambage (Sri Lanka) S Samarasinghe	5	5
(Kazakhstan) K Kulmatov (Kazakhstan) N Ismailova	6	5
(Malaysia) D I Devadass (Malaysia) Ti W C	21	21
(Vietnam) Ngo X T (Vietnam) Ding T P H	w	/	o
(China) Wang YL (China) Huang DP

Second round
7	(South Korea) Jun B-c (South Korea) Lee S-h	21	21
(Japan) T Inoue (Japan) A Sakuramoto	18	16
(Malaysia) D I Devadass (Malaysia) Ti W C	13	11
(China) Wang YL (China) Huang DP	21	21

Third round
7	(South Korea) Jun B-c (South Korea) Lee S-h	14	21	13
(China) Wang YL (China) Huang DP	21	18	21

==== Section 3 ====
First round
(Chinese Taipei) Yang P-h (Chinese Taipei) Shih Y-c	21	21
(Mongolia) E Purevsuren (Mongolia) U Khuderbold	6	12
(Sri Lanka) M De Silva (Sri Lanka) S Janithanjali	21	21
(Uzbekistan) A Savatyugin (Uzbekistan) V Mushtakova	15	18

Second round
3	(Malaysia) Tan W G (Malaysia) Chow M K	21	21
(Chinese Taipei) Yang P-h (Chinese Taipei) Shih Y-c	15	18
(South Korea) Ra M-y (South Korea) Han G-h	21	21
(Sri Lanka) M De Silva (Sri Lanka) S Janithanjali	5	12

Third round
3	(Malaysia) Tan W G (Malaysia) Chow M K	21	21
(South Korea) Ra M-y (South Korea) Han G-h	14	18

==== Section 4 ====
First round
(Singapore) Tan M S (Singapore) F Seah	11	14
(Vietnam) Do T D (Vietnam) Le T H	21	21
(Japan) K Matsui (Japan) S Hayata	14	17
(China) Zhang NY (China) He JX	21	21
(India) H Babu (India) M Jakkampudi	19	21
(South Korea) Ryu S-h (South Korea) Lee S-m	21	23

Second round
6	(Indonesia) H Faizal (Indonesia) M D Giovani	17	21	12
(Vietnam) Do T D (Vietnam) Le T H	21	10	21
(China) Zhang NY (China) He JX	18	21	18
(South Korea) Ryu S-h (South Korea) Lee S-m	21	14	21

Third round
(Vietnam) Do T D (Vietnam) Le T H	21	21
(South Korea) Ryu S-h (South Korea) Lee S-m	15	14

=== Bottom Half ===
==== Section 5 ====
First round
(India) G R Geovani (India) P S Ram	7	12
(South Korea) Bae K-y (South Korea) Shin S-c	21	21
(Thailand) S Ampanporn (Thailand) P Supajirakul	21	21
(Sri Lanka) P L Ambegoda (Sri Lanka) M Fonseka	12	15
(Vietnam) Pham H N (Vietnam) Pham N T
(Nepal) D Dhami (Nepal) S Shrestha	w	/	o

Second round
(South Korea) Bae K-y (South Korea) Shin S-c	21	21
(Thailand) S Ampanporn (Thailand) P Supajirakul	11	12
(Vietnam) Pham H N (Vietnam) Pham N T	13	18
8	(Indonesia) P E Rhoma (Indonesia) N K M Istirani	21	21

Third round
(South Korea) Bae K-y (South Korea) Shin S-c	21	21
8	(Indonesia) P E Rhoma (Indonesia) N K M Istirani	15	18

==== Section 6 ====
First round
(Singapore) S Lee (Singapore) J Chua	14	11
(Chinese Taipei) Tien T-c (Chinese Taipei) Chang Y-h	21	21
(Hong Kong) Lee C H (Hong Kong) Yuen S Y	21	21
(Uzbekistan) B Appakhodjaev (Uzbekistan) A Khurshudyan	8	9
(China) Liu YC (China) Chen QC	21	21
(Malaysia) C Ong (Malaysia) Chin K M	6	15

Second round
(Chinese Taipei) Tien T-c (Chinese Taipei) Chang Y-h	17	17
(Hong Kong) Lee C H (Hong Kong) Yuen S Y	21	21
(China) Liu YC (China) Chen QC	21	21
4	(Japan) K Miura (Japan) A Watanabe	17	18

Third round
(Hong Kong) Lee C H (Hong Kong) Yuen S Y	20	16
(China) Liu YC (China) Chen QC	22	21

==== Section 7 ====
First round
(Sri Lanka) P K Hettiarachchi (Sri Lanka) O Kuruppu	9	9
(South Korea) Park S-w (South Korea) Kim J-w	21	21
(Thailand) N Kitphaibool (Thailand) W Hongchookeat	11	12
(Malaysia) Tan A K (Malaysia) Lee M Y	21	21
(Chinese Taipei) Wu H-l (Chinese Taipei) Chen T-y	20	19
(Japan) A Koga (Japan) A Yamaguchi	22	21

Second round
(South Korea) Park S-w (South Korea) Kim J-w	20	21	21
(Malaysia) Tai A K (Malaysia) Lee M Y	22	19	14
(Japan) A Koga (Japan) A Yamaguchi	11	16
5	(Indonesia) A E Prasetya (Indonesia) S D Aulia	21	21

Third round
(South Korea) Park S-w (South Korea) Kim J-w	21	21
5	(Indonesia) A E Prasetya (Indonesia) S D Aulia	18	19

==== Section 8 ====
First round
(China) Pei TY (China) Huang YQ	21	21
(Hong Kong) Chang T C (Hong Kong) Tsang W C	11	5
(Vietnam) Pham C C (Vietnam) Thai V N	22	11
(Singapore) M A Ishak (Singapore) Liang XY	24	21

Second round
(China) Pei TY (China) Huang YQ	21	21
(India) S Ravuri (India) M Kukkapalli	10	15
(Singapore) M A Ishak (Singapore) Liang XY	13	13
2	(South Korea) Choi S-g (South Korea) Chae Y-j	21	21

Third round
(China) Pei TY (China) Huang YQ	19	19
2	(South Korea) Choi S-g (South Korea) Chae Y-j	21	21
