= Badminton at the 2022 Asian Games – Mixed doubles =

Mixed doubles at the 2022 Asian Games
- Venue: Binjiang Gymnasium
- Dates: 2–7 October 2023

Medalists
gold medal	Zheng Siwei; Huang Yaqiong	China
silver medal	Yuta Watanabe; Arisa Higashino	Japan
bronze medal	Feng Yanzhe; Huang Dongping	China
bronze medal	Seo Seung-jae; Chae Yoo-jung	South Korea

The badminton mixed doubles tournament at the 2022 Asian Games in Hangzhou took place from 2 to 7 October 2023 at Binjiang Gymnasium.

== Schedule ==
All times are China Standard Time (UTC+08:00)

Date	Time	Event
Monday, 2 October 2023	10:00	Round of 32
Wednesday, 3 October 2023	10:00	Round of 16
Thursday, 4 October 2023	9:00	Quarter-finals
Friday, 6 October 2023	9:00	Semi-finals
Saturday, 7 October 2023	14:00	Gold medal match

== Results ==
=== Seeds ===
1. Zheng Siwei / Huang Yaqiong (CHN) (champions)
2. Yuta Watanabe / Arisa Higashino (JPN) (final)
3. Feng Yanzhe / Huang Dongping (CHN) (semi-finals)
4. Dechapol Puavaranukroh / Sapsiree Taerattanachai (THA) (second round)

=== Finals ===
Semi-finals
1	Zheng Siwei (CHN); Huang Yaqiong (CHN)	13	21	21
Seo Seung-jae (KOR); Chae Yoo-jung (KOR)	21	15	16
3	Feng Yanzhe (CHN); Huang Dongping (CHN)	21	20	17
2	Yuta Watanabe (JPN); Arisa Higashino (JPN)	11	22	21

Final
1	Zheng Siwei (CHN); Huang Yaqiong (CHN)	21	21
2	Yuta Watanabe (JPN); Arisa Higashino (JPN)	15	14

=== Top half ===
==== Section 1 ====
First round
Z Munkhbaatar (MGL); K Darkhanbaatar (MGL)	16	17
B Katwal (NEP); N Tamang (NEP)	21	21
Sai P K (IND); T Crasto (IND)	21	21
Leong I C (MAC); Ng W C (MAC)	18	14
A Kwek (SGP); C Wong (SGP)	17	13
Chen T J (MAS); Toh E W (MAS)	21	21

Second round
1	Zheng SW (CHN); Huang YQ (CHN)	21	21
B Katwal (NEP); N Tamang (NEP)	4	7
Sai P K (IND); T Crasto (IND)	18	18
Chen T J (MAS); Toh E W (MAS)	21	21

Quarter-finals
1	Zheng SW (CHN); Huang YQ (CHN)	21	23
Chen T J (MAS); Toh E W (MAS)	14	21

==== Section 2 ====
First round
H Z Shaheed (MDV); F N Abdul Razzaq (MDV)	7	4
Seo S-j (KOR); Chae Y-j (KOR)	21	21
R N Kusharjanto (INA); L A Kusumawati (INA)	13	20
Ye H-w (TPE); Lee C-h (TPE)	21	22
K Yamashita (JPN); N Shinoya (JPN)	18	14
Lee C H (HKG); Ng T Y (HKG)	21	21

Second round
4	D Puavaranukroh (THA); S Taerattanachai (THA)	13	11
Seo S-j (KOR); Chae Y-j (KOR)	21	21
Ye H-w (TPE); Lee C-h (TPE)	21	18	21
Lee C H (HKG); Ng T Y (HKG)	12	21	17

Quarter-finals
Seo S-j (KOR); Chae Y-j (KOR)	23	21
Ye H-w (TPE); Lee C-h (TPE)	21	10

=== Bottom half ===
==== Section 3 ====
First round
A Nibal (MDV); A N Abdul Razzaq (MDV)	6	9
S Jomkoh (THA); S Paewsampran (THA)	21	21
R Kapoor (IND); N. S Reddy (IND)	0^{r}
Goh S H (MAS); S J Lai (MAS)	2
D Panarin (KAZ); K Smagulova (KAZ)	21	21
B Davaasuren (MGL); K Baatar (MGL)	2	7

Second round
S Jomkoh (THA); S Paewsampran (THA)	17	23	21
Goh S H (MAS); S J Lai (MAS)	21	21	13
D Panarin (KAZ); K Smagulova (KAZ)	6	9
3	Feng YZ (CHN); Huang DP (CHN)	21	21

Quarter-finals
S Jomkoh (THA); S Paewsampran (THA)	14	17
3	Feng YZ (CHN); Huang DP (CHN)	21	21

==== Section 4 ====
First round
T Hee (SGP); J Tan (SGP)	21	21
J Acharya (NEP); N Lamsal (NEP)	4	3
R Sing (TLS); Z de Jesus (TLS)	5	15
Tang C M (HKG); Tse Y S (HKG)	21	21
R Rivaldy (INA); P H Mentari (INA)	21	15	21
Kim W-h (KOR); Jeong N-e (KOR)	15	21	19

Second round
T Hee (SGP); J Tan (SGP)	7	11
Tang C M (HKG); Tse Y S (HKG)	21	21
R Rivaldy (INA); P H Mentari (INA)	17	15
2	Y Watanabe (JPN); A Higashino (JPN)	21	21

Quarter-finals
Tang C M (HKG); Tse Y S (HKG)	18	18
2	Y Watanabe (JPN); A Higashino (JPN)	21	21
