= 2013 Asian Junior Badminton Championships – Mixed doubles =

Tournament details
- Dates: 10 – 14 July 2013
- Edition: 16
- Venue: Likas Indoor Stadium
- Location: Kota Kinabalu, Malaysia

The Mixed Doubles tournament of the 2013 Asian Junior Badminton Championships was held from July 10–14 in Kota Kinabalu, Malaysia. The defending champion of in this event were Choi Sol-kyu and Chae Yoo-jung of South Korea. Choi and Chae successfully claim the title back to back after beating Chinese pair, the second seeded Liu Yuchen and Huang Dongping in the finals with the score 21–11, 19–21, 21–13.

== Seeded ==
1. (South Korea) Choi Sol-kyu / Chae Yoo-jung (champion)
2. (China) Liu Yuchen / Huang Dongping (final)
3. (China) Huang Kaixiang / Chen Qingchen (semi-final)
4. (Hong Kong) Tang Chun Man / Ng Wing Yung (quarter-final)
5. (Thailand) Dechapol Puavaranukroh / Puttita Supajirakul (quarter-final)
6. (South Korea) Kim Jung-ho / Kim Ji-won (semi-final)
7. (Malaysia) Chua Khek Wei / Yap Cheng Wen (quarter-final)
8. (Malaysia) Darren Isaac Devadass / Joyce Choong Wai Chi (second round)

== Draw ==
=== Finals ===
Quarterfinals
1	(South Korea) Choi Sol-kyu (South Korea) Chae Yoo-jung	21	21
7	(Malaysia) Chua Khek Wei (Malaysia) Yap Cheng Wen	5	8
3	(China) Huang Kaixiang (China) Chen Qingchen	21	21
5	(Thailand) Dechapol Puavaranukroh (Thailand) Puttita Supajirakul	11	10
6	(South Korea) Kim Jung-ho (South Korea) Kim Ji-won	21	21
4	(Hong Kong) Tang Chun Man (Hong Kong) Ng Wing Yung	11	19
(South Korea) Park Se-woong (South Korea) Lee Sun-min	8	8
2	(China) Liu Yuchen (China) Huang Dongping	21	21

Semifinals
1	(South Korea) Choi Sol-kyu (South Korea) Chae Yoo-jung	18	21	21
3	(China) Huang Kaixiang (China) Chen Qingchen	21	17	16
6	(South Korea) Kim Jung-ho (South Korea) Kim Ji-won	13	16
2	(China) Liu Yuchen (China) Huang Dongping	21	21

Final
1	(South Korea) Choi Sol-kyu (South Korea) Chae Yoo-jung	21	19	21
2	(China) Liu Yuchen (China) Huang Dongping	11	21	13

=== Top Half ===
==== Section 1 ====
First Round
1	(South Korea) Choi S-k (South Korea) Chae Y-j
BYE
(China) Tao JQ (China) He JX	21	21
(Malaysia) Chen JH (Malaysia) Yap Z	15	14
(Hong Kong) Y Chung (Hong Kong) L Yeung	21	21
(Sri Lanka) I Kahingalage (Sri Lanka) Y Dayarathne	13	13
(Singapore) T Hee (Singapore) E Chua	21	21
(Vietnam) Duong QK (Vietnam) Tran TLG	15	19

Second Round
1	(South Korea) Choi S-k (South Korea) Chae Y-j	21	21
(China) Tao JQ (China) He JX	12	11
(Hong Kong) Y Chung (Hong Kong) L Yeung	21	23
(Singapore) T Hee (Singapore) E Chua	19	21

Third Round
1	(South Korea) Choi S-k (South Korea) Chae Y-j	21	21
(Hong Kong) Y Chung (Hong Kong) L Yeung	8	8

==== Section 2 ====
First Round
7	(Malaysia) Chua KW (Malaysia) Yap CW
BYE
(Indonesia) R Nugroho (Indonesia) S Mapasa	21	21
(India) S Ravuri (India) P Ram	12	15
(Japan) K Matsumoto (Japan) M Matsumoto	21	22	21
(Thailand) S Suharitdumrong (Thailand) V Iamratanamaetheekul	15	24	18
(Chinese Taipei) Liao C-h (Chinese Taipei) Shih Y-c	21	21
(Macau) Iek UI (Macau) Kuan CL	17	12

Second Round
7	(Malaysia) Chua KW (Malaysia) Yap CW	17	24	24
(Indonesia) R Nugroho (Indonesia) S Mapasa	21	22	22
(Japan) K Matsumoto (Japan) M Matsumoto	21	16
(Chinese Taipei) Liao C-h (Chinese Taipei) Shih Y-c	23	21

Third Round
7	(Malaysia) Chua KW (Malaysia) Yap CW	17	21	21
(Chinese Taipei) Liao C-h (Chinese Taipei) Shih Y-c	21	15	14

==== Section 3 ====
First Round
3	(China) Huang KX (China) Chen QC
BYE
(South Korea) Kim J-h (South Korea) Kim N-y	21	21
(Kazakhstan) D Malikov (Kazakhstan) A Kassenova	5	7
(Sri Lanka) C Handunkuttihettige (Sri Lanka) S Hettiarachchi	21	13	21
(Nepal) T Bijeet (Nepal) S Pradhan	6	21	10
(Uzbekistan) A Bakhshulaev (Uzbekistan) M Pakina	8	13
(Hong Kong) Chang TC (Hong Kong) Tsang WC	21	21

Second Round
3	(China) Huang KX (China) Chen QC	21	21
(South Korea) Kim J-h (South Korea) Kim N-y	17	8
(Sri Lanka) C Handunkuttihettige (Sri Lanka) S Hettiarachchi	13	7
(Hong Kong) Chang TC (Hong Kong) Tsang WC	21	21

Third Round
3	(China) Huang KX (China) Chen QC	21	21
(Hong Kong) Chang TC (Hong Kong) Tsang WC	10	11

==== Section 4 ====
First Round
5	(Thailand) D Puavaranukroh (Thailand) P Supajirakul	21	21
(Macau) Lou HM (Macau) Ng WC	3	7
(India) S Ramachandran (India) R Mukherjee	10	18
(Singapore) Tan ZJ (Singapore) F Seah	21	21
(Malaysia) Ng DH (Malaysia) Cheah YS	19	18
(Chinese Taipei) Tien T-c (Chinese Taipei) Chang C-h	21	21
(Indonesia) R Swastedian (Indonesia) M Mahmudin	14	21	21
(Japan) H Shimono (Japan) A Higashino	21	15	19

Second Round
5	(Thailand) D Puavaranukroh (Thailand) P Supajirakul	21	21
(Singapore) Tan ZJ (Singapore) F Seah	8	18
(Chinese Taipei) Tien T-c (Chinese Taipei) Chang C-h	21	16	21
(Indonesia) R Swastedian (Indonesia) M Mahmudin	18	21	19

Third Round
5	(Thailand) D Puavaranukroh (Thailand) P Supajirakul	21	21
(Chinese Taipei) Tien T-c (Chinese Taipei) Chang C-h	18	14

=== Bottom Half ===
==== Section 5 ====
First Round
(Malaysia) Chua KY (Malaysia) Chin KM	19	13
(Thailand) T Jumpanoi (Thailand) R Laisuan	21	21
(Indonesia) F Alfian (Indonesia) F Kusumawati	21	21
(Macau) J Lo (Macau) Wong KI	7	12
(Japan) T Hoki (Japan) W Nagahara	21	21
(Kazakhstan) K Kulmatov (Uzbekistan) N Ismailova	4	5
(China) Li JH (China) Zhu MC	21	9	23
6	(South Korea) Kim J-h (South Korea) Kim J-w	11	21	25

Second Round
(Thailand) T Jumpanoi (Thailand) R Laisuan	21	21
(Indonesia) F Alfian (Indonesia) F Kusumawati	14	14
(Japan) T Hoki (Japan) W Nagahara	13	21	15
6	(South Korea) Kim J-h (South Korea) Kim J-w	21	13	21

Third Round
(Thailand) T Jumpanoi (Thailand) R Laisuan	17	18
6	(South Korea) Kim J-h (South Korea) Kim J-w	21	21

==== Section 6 ====
First Round
(Malaysia) A Nurizwan (Malaysia) Peck YW	21	21
(Sri Lanka) S Angodavidanalage (Sri Lanka) K Sirimannage	10	15
(Chinese Taipei) Chang K-c (Chinese Taipei) Chang Y-h	21	21
(Nepal) D Dhami (Nepal) S Shrestha	10	7
(Singapore) R Ng (Singapore) Yeo JM	21	25
SUB	(India) V Singh (India) K Garg	15	23
BYE
4	(Hong Kong) Tang CM (Hong Kong) Ng WY

Second Round
(Malaysia) A Nurizwan (Malaysia) Peck YW	19	15
(Chinese Taipei) Chang K-c (Chinese Taipei) Chang Y-h	21	21
(Singapore) R Ng (Singapore) Yeo JM	13	12
4	(Hong Kong) Tang CM (Hong Kong) Ng WY	21	21

Third Round
(Chinese Taipei) Chang K-c (Chinese Taipei) Chang Y-h	14	14
4	(Hong Kong) Tang CM (Hong Kong) Ng WY	21	21

==== Section 7 ====
First Round
(Vietnam) Do TD (Vietnam) Nguyen TL	13	21	21
(Singapore) D Ng (Singapore) G Chua	21	8	14
(Hong Kong) Yeung SC (Hong Kong) Wu YT	11	13
(South Korea) Park S-w (South Korea) Lee S-m	21	21
(Uzbekistan) H Orziboev (Uzbekistan) V Mushtakova	3	7
(Chinese Taipei) Wang C-l (Chinese Taipei) Lee C-h	21	21
BYE
8	(Malaysia) D Devadass (Malaysia) J Choong

Second Round
(Vietnam) Do TD (Vietnam) Nguyen TL	13	18
(South Korea) Park S-w (South Korea) Lee S-m	21	21
(Chinese Taipei) Wang C-l (Chinese Taipei) Lee C-h	21	21
8	(Malaysia) D Devadass (Malaysia) J Choong	14	17

Third Round
(South Korea) Park S-w (South Korea) Lee S-m	21	21
(Chinese Taipei) Wang C-l (Chinese Taipei) Lee C-h	14	13

==== Section 8 ====
First Round
(Macau) Vong IC (Macau) Gong XX	4	3
(Japan) Y Igarashi (Japan) A Matsuda	21	21
(Sri Lanka) P Amaranayake (Sri Lanka) I De Silva	10	11
(Indonesia) A Ardiputra (Indonesia) D Surya	21	21
(Thailand) S Pol-Gul (Thailand) L Narissapat	21	21
(India) S Shukla (India) Meghana J.	16	18
BYE
2	(China) Liu YC (China) Huang DP

Second Round
(Japan) Y Igarashi (Japan) A Matsuda	19	22
(Indonesia) A Ardiputra (Indonesia) D Surya	21	24
(Thailand) S Pol-Gul (Thailand) L Narissapat	11	20
2	(China) Liu YC (China) Huang DP	21	22

Third Round
(Indonesia) A Ardiputra (Indonesia) D Surya	17	10
2	(China) Liu YC (China) Huang DP	21	21
