= 2013 BWF World Junior Championships – Mixed doubles =

The Mixed Doubles tournament of the 2013 BWF World Junior Championships was held from October 29 until November 3. Edi Subaktiar and Melati Daeva Oktaviani from Indonesia won the tournament last year.

This year, Chinese pair Huang Kaixiang / Chen Qingchen took the gold medal, beating The Indonesian's Kevin Sanjaya Sukamuljo and Masita Mahmudin by 21-18, 20-22, 23-21 in the thriller and classic final match that ended after about an hour.

== Seeded ==
1. (South Korea) Choi Sol-kyu / Chae Yoo-jung (semi-final)
2. (China) Liu Yuchen / Huang Dongping (semi-final)
3. (China) Huang Kaixiang / Chen Qingchen (champion)
4. (South Korea) Kim Jung-ho / Kim Hye-rin (fourth round)
5. (Malaysia) Chua Khek Wei / Yap Cheng Wen (second round)
6. (Thailand) Dechapol Puavaranukroh / Puttita Supajirakul (quarter-final)
7. (Hong Kong) Tang Chun Man / Ng Wing Yung (fourth round)
8. (Russia) Alexandr Zinchenko / Olga Morozova (fourth round)
9. (Netherlands) Ruben Jille / Alida Chen (second round)
10. (Thailand) Thanadol Jumpanoi / Ruethaichanok Laisuan (third round)
11. (South Korea) Kim Jae-hwan / Kim Ji-won (third round)
12. (Finland) Iikka Heino / Mathilda Lindholm (second round)
13. (Denmark) Frederik Sogaard Mortensen / Maiken Fruergaard (fourth round)
14. (Germany) Fabian Roth / Jennifer Karnott (fourth round)
15. (Denmark) Marvin Seidel / Lara Kaepplein (third round)
16. (Indonesia) Kevin Sanjaya Sukamuljo / Masita Mahmudin (final)

== Draw ==
=== Finals ===
Quarterfinals
1	(South Korea) Choi Sol-kyu (South Korea) Chae Yoo-jung	21	22
(Chinese Taipei) Lee Yang (Chinese Taipei) Wen Hao-yun	9	20
3/4	(China) Huang Kaixiang (China) Chen Qingchen	21	21
5/8	(Thailand) Dechapol Puavaranukroh (Thailand) Puttita Supajirakul	18	11
9/16	(Indonesia) Kevin Sanjaya Sukamuljo (Indonesia) Masita Mahmudin	21	21
(Thailand) Kittiphon Chairojkanjana (Thailand) Lam Narissapat	12	6
(Singapore) Terry Hee Yong Kai (Singapore) Elaine Chua Yi Ling	13	17
2	(China) Liu Yuchen (China) Huang Dongping	21	21

Semifinals
1	(South Korea) Choi Sol-kyu (South Korea) Chae Yoo-jung	13	11
3/4	(China) Huang Kaixiang (China) Chen Qingchen	21	21
9/16	(Indonesia) Kevin Sanjaya Sukamuljo (Indonesia) Masita Mahmudin	6	21	21
2	(China) Liu Yuchen (China) Huang Dongping	21	17	19

Final
3/4	(China) Huang Kaixiang (China) Chen Qingchen	21	20	23
9/16	(Indonesia) Kevin Sanjaya Sukamuljo (Indonesia) Masita Mahmudin	18	22	21

=== Top Half ===
==== Section 1 ====
First round
(Canada) B Lin (Canada) K O'Donoghue	21	15
(China) Li JH (China) Zhu MC	18	21	21
(India) S Ravuri (India) P Ram	21	21
(United States) R Zeng (United States) A Wang	11	8

Second round
1	(South Korea) Choi S-k (South Korea) Chae Y-j	21	21
(Armenia) E Nazaretyan (Armenia) L Poghosyan	4	3
(France) J Corvee (France) M Batomene	23	22	16
(China) Li JH (China) Zhu MC	21	24	21
9/16	(Germany) F Roth (Germany) J Karnott	17	21	21
(United States) A Khor (United States) A Tang	21	14	10
(Sri Lanka) I Kahingalage (Sri Lanka) B Thotahewage	9	24
(India) S Ravuri (India) P Ram	21	26

Third round
1	(South Korea) Choi S-k (South Korea) Chae Y-j	21	21
(China) Li JH (China) Zhu MC	5	12
9/16	(Germany) F Roth (Germany) J Karnott	21	21
(India) S Ravuri (India) P Ram	11	13

Fourth round
1	(South Korea) Choi S-k (South Korea) Chae Y-j	21	21
9/16	(Germany) F Roth (Germany) J Karnott	12	10

==== Section 2 ====
First round
(Japan) Y Onodera (Japan) A Higashino	21	21
(Uzbekistan) M Rakhimov (Uzbekistan) A Khurshudyan	3	3
(Indonesia) A Ardi Putra (Indonesia) S Mapasa	15	12
(Chinese Taipei) Lee Y (Chinese Taipei) Wen H-y	21	21
(Sri Lanka) B Yatawara (Sri Lanka) L Geeganage	21	21
(South Africa) B von Bodenstein (South Africa) D Botha	11	16

Second round
5/8	(Malaysia) Chua KW (Malaysia) Yap CW	11	21	17
(Hong Kong) Chang TC (Hong Kong) Tsang WC	21	19	21
(Turkey) E Sesalan (Turkey) O Ozer	8	13
(Japan) Y Onodera (Japan) A Higashino	21	21
9/16	(South Korea) Kim J-h (South Korea) Kim J-w	21	24
(Vietnam) Do TD (Vietnam) Nguyen TL	16	22
(Chinese Taipei) Lee Y (Chinese Taipei) Wen H-y	21	21
(Sri Lanka) B Yatawara (Sri Lanka) L Geeganage	8	9

Third round
(Hong Kong) Chang TC (Hong Kong) Tsang WC	26	16	21
(Japan) Y Onodera (Japan) A Higashino	24	21	9
9/16	(South Korea) Kim J-h (South Korea) Kim J-w	15	20
(Chinese Taipei) Lee Y (Chinese Taipei) Wen H-y	21	22

Fourth round
(Hong Kong) Chang TC (Hong Kong) Tsang WC	14	13
(Chinese Taipei) Lee Y (Chinese Taipei) Wen H-y	21	21

==== Section 3 ====
First round
(Malaysia) Ong YS (Malaysia) J Choong	22	21
(France) V Heriau (France) A Tran	20	16
(China) Tao JQ (China) Du Y	12	21	21
(Japan) Y Nakazato (Japan) A Matsuda	21	19	18
(Scotland) J Neil (Scotland) J MacPherson	13	23	21
(Czech Republic) J Janacek (Czech Republic) D Sikalova	21	21	17

Second round
3/4	(China) Huang KX (China) Chen QC	21	21
(Finland) A Lahtinen (Finland) L Vainula	6	13
(Botswana) T Perekisi (Botswana) T Kabelo	5	9
(Malaysia) Ong YS (Malaysia) J Choong	21	21
9/16	(Germany) M Seidel (Germany) L Kaepplein	21	21
(India) C Sen (India) K Garg	14	18
(China) Tao JQ (China) Du Y	21	21
(Scotland) J Neil (Scotland) J MacPherson	7	8

Third round
3/4	(China) Huang KX (China) Chen QC	21	21
(Malaysia) Ong YS (Malaysia) J Choong	9	7
9/16	(Germany) M Seidel (Germany) L Kaepplein	15	19
(China) Tao JQ (China) Du Y	21	21

Fourth round
3/4	(China) Huang KX (China) Chen QC	21	0
(China) Tao JQ (China) Du Y	11	0^{r}

==== Section 4 ====
First round
(Russia) S Molodov (Russia) E Kut	17	16
(Australia) D Guda (Australia) G Somerville	21	21
(Japan) T Hoki (Japan) R Miyaura	21	21
(Singapore) D Ng (Singapore) F Seah	12	10
(Czech Republic) A Mendrek (Czech Republic) M Svetnickova	21	21
(Macau) Wan WC (Macau) Wong KI	11	13

Second round
5/8	(Thailand) D Puavaranukroh (Thailand) P Supajirakul	21	21
(Finland) V Nieminen (Finland) A Paavola	5	12
(Singapore) R Ng (Singapore) G Chua	15	18
(Australia) D Guda (Australia) G Somerville	21	21
9/16	(Denmark) F Mortensen (Denmark) M Fruergaard	21	21
(Spain) J Suarez (Spain) S Penalver	13	9
(Japan) T Hoki (Japan) R Miyaura	21	21
(Czech Republic) A Mendrek (Czech Republic) M Svetnickova	12	10

Third round
5/8	(Thailand) D Puavaranukroh (Thailand) P Supajirakul	21	21
(Australia) D Guda (Australia) G Somerville	18	13
9/16	(Denmark) F Mortensen (Denmark) M Fruergaard	21	21
(Japan) T Hoki (Japan) R Miyaura	12	14

Fourth round
5/8	(Thailand) D Puavaranukroh (Thailand) P Supajirakul	21	21
9/16	(Denmark) F Mortensen (Denmark) M Fruergaard	12	12

=== Bottom Half ===
==== Section 5 ====
First round
(Czech Republic) J Louda (Czech Republic) M Lajdova	21	21
(Sri Lanka) M Wanniarachchige (Sri Lanka) C Nandasiri	9	14
(Indonesia) R Swastedian (Indonesia) D Surya	21	21
(Russia) D Riabov (Russia) K Averkina	15	14
(Malaysia) Tan JH (Malaysia) Goh YC	21	21
(South Korea) Seo S-j (South Korea) Kong H-y	18	19

Second round
(Czech Republic) J Louda (Czech Republic) M Lajdova	16
(Indonesia) R Swastedian (Indonesia) D Surya	21	21
(Canada) N Cheng (Canada) R Honderich	17	7
9/16	(Indonesia) K Sukamuljo (Indonesia) M Mahmudin	21	21
(Malaysia) Tan JH (Malaysia) Goh YC	21	21
(United States) K Chan (United States) C Yang	7	7
(Scotland) A Hall (Scotland) H MacPherson	16	10
5/8	(Hong Kong) Tang CM (Hong Kong) Ng WY	21	21

Third round
(Indonesia) R Swastedian (Indonesia) D Surya	10	9
9/16	(Indonesia) K Sukamuljo (Indonesia) M Mahmudin	21	21
(Malaysia) Tan JH (Malaysia) Goh YC	21	19
5/8	(Hong Kong) Tang CM (Hong Kong) Ng WY	23	21

Fourth round
9/16	(Indonesia) K Sukamuljo (Indonesia) M Mahmudin	13	21	21
5/8	(Hong Kong) Tang CM (Hong Kong) Ng WY	21	15	12

==== Section 6 ====
First round
(Armenia) G Hakobyan (Armenia) L Minasyan	8	10
(Thailand) K Chairojkanjana (Thailand) L Narissapat	21	21
(Malaysia) Chua KY (Malaysia) Chin KM	21
(Uzbekistan) A Bakhshullaev (Uzbekistan) M Pakina	13	7
(Botswana) P Leoke (Botswana) G Mhlauli	7	6
(Uzbekistan) H Azimov (Uzbekistan) V Mushtakova	21	21

Second round
(Thailand) K Chairojkanjana (Thailand) L Narissapat	21	21
(Malaysia) Chua KY (Malaysia) Chin KM	12	16
(South Africa) M Jennings (South Africa) J van der Vyver	11	18
9/16	(Thailand) T Jumpanoi (Thailand) R Laisuan	21	21
(Uzbekistan) H Azimov (Uzbekistan) V Mushtakova	9	6
(India) S Shukla (India) Meghana J.	21	21
(Japan) H Shimono (Japan) W Nagahara	21	21	15
3/4	(South Korea) Kim J-h (South Korea) Kim H-r	18	23	21

Third round
(Thailand) K Chairojkanjana (Thailand) L Narissapat	15	21	21
9/16	(Thailand) T Jumpanoi (Thailand) R Laisuan	21	11	16
(India) S Shukla (India) Meghana J.	13	10
3/4	(South Korea) Kim J-h (South Korea) Kim H-r	21	21

Fourth round
(Thailand) K Chairojkanjana (Thailand) L Narissapat	21	21
3/4	(South Korea) Kim J-h (South Korea) Kim H-r	18	19

==== Section 7 ====
First round
(Singapore) T Hee (Singapore) E Chua	21	21
(Indonesia) R Nugroho (Indonesia) F Kusumawati	16	12
(Canada) D Yao (Canada) B Tam	23	11	21
(Hong Kong) Y Chung (Hong Kong) Ng TY	21	21	11
(Thailand) T Boonrawd (Thailand) K Ostermeyer	21	21
(Australia) A Joe (Australia) J Lai	12	9

Second round
(Singapore) T Hee (Singapore) E Chua	19	21	21
(Canada) D Yao (Canada) B Tam	21	13	11
(Denmark) A Bond (Denmark) R Hansen	21	21
9/16	(Finland) I Heino (Finland) M Lindholm	18	19
(Thailand) T Boonrawd (Thailand) K Ostermeyer	21	21
(Vietnam) Nguyen DTK (Vietnam) Do TH	17	16
(Australia) E Vuong (Australia) V Mak	10	7
5/8	(Russia) A Zinchenko (Russia) O Morozova	21	21

Third round
(Singapore) T Hee (Singapore) E Chua	21	21	21
(Denmark) A Bond (Denmark) R Hansen	23	12	12
(Thailand) T Boonrawd (Thailand) K Ostermeyer	18	21	19
5/8	(Russia) A Zinchenko (Russia) O Morozova	21	13	21

Fourth round
(Singapore) T Hee (Singapore) E Chua	22	21
5/8	(Russia) A Zinchenko (Russia) O Morozova	20	12

==== Section 8 ====
First round
(Hong Kong) Yeung SC (Hong Kong) Chan TK	14	13
(Chinese Taipei) Liao C-h (Chinese Taipei) Chang H-t	21	21
(France) L Mittelheisser (France) S Guerin	21	21
(Turkey) S Zorlu (Turkey) K Karatas	19	7
(Macau) Tai KH (Macau) U TI	9	17
(South Africa) C Coetzer (South Africa) A Schoonees	21	21

Second round
(Chinese Taipei) Liao C-h (Chinese Taipei) Chang H-t	21	25
(France) L Mittelheisser (France) S Guerin	18	23
(Chinese Taipei) Wang C-l (Chinese Taipei) Chang C-h	21	21
9/16	(Netherlands) R Jille (Netherlands) A Chen	12	16
(South Africa) C Coetzer (South Africa) A Schoonees	12	9
(Germany) J Pistorius (Germany) L Efler	21	21
(Chinese Taipei) Chiang Y-w (Chinese Taipei) Ye J-y	18	17
2	(China) Liu YC (China) Huang DP	21	21

Third round
(Chinese Taipei) Liao C-h (Chinese Taipei) Chang H-t	12	18
(Chinese Taipei) Wang C-l (Chinese Taipei) Chang C-h	21	21
(Germany) J Pistorius (Germany) L Efler	10	17
2	(China) Liu YC (China) Huang DP	21	21

Fourth round
(Chinese Taipei) Wang C-l (Chinese Taipei) Chang C-h	19	18
2	(China) Liu YC (China) Huang DP	21	21
