= Chae Yoo-jung =

South Korean badminton player (born 1995)

Chae Yoo-jung 채유정
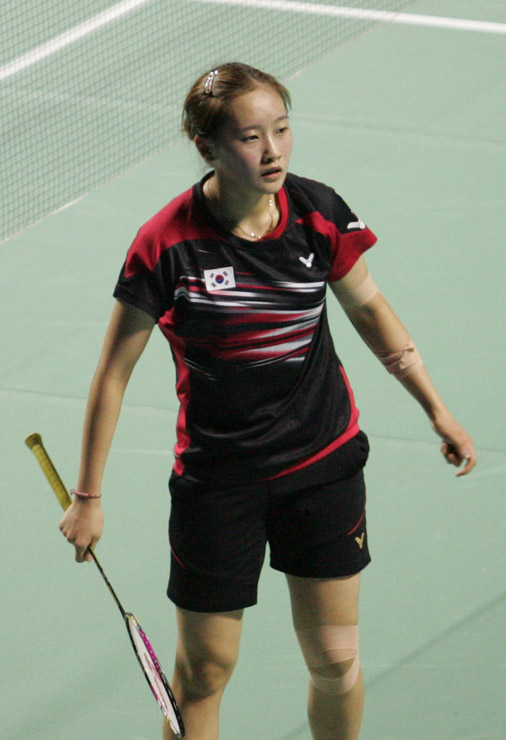
- Chae at the 2015 Korea Grand Prix Gold

Personal information
- Born: 9 May 1995 (age 31) Busan, South Korea
- Height: 1.63 m (5 ft 4 in)

Sport
- Country: South Korea
- Sport: Badminton
- Handedness: Left

Women's & mixed doubles
- Highest ranking: 13 (WD with Kim So-yeong, 23 November 2017); 2 (XD with Seo Seung-jae, 12 March 2024)
- Current ranking: 42 (XD with Lee Jong-min, 14 October 2025)
- BWF profile
Medal record
Women's badminton
Representing South Korea
World Championships
Gold medal – first place	2023 Copenhagen	Mixed doubles
Sudirman Cup
Gold medal – first place	2017 Gold Coast	Mixed team
Silver medal – second place	2023 Suzhou	Mixed team
Silver medal – second place	2025 Xiamen	Mixed team
Bronze medal – third place	2015 Dongguan	Mixed team
Bronze medal – third place	2021 Vantaa	Mixed team
Uber Cup
Bronze medal – third place	2020 Aarhus	Women's team
Asian Games
Gold medal – first place	2022 Hangzhou	Women's team
Bronze medal – third place	2022 Hangzhou	Mixed doubles
Asia Championships
Silver medal – second place	2024 Ningbo	Mixed doubles
Bronze medal – third place	2016 Wuhan	Mixed doubles
Asia Mixed Team Championships
Silver medal – second place	2017 Ho Chi Minh	Mixed team
East Asian Games
Bronze medal – third place	2013 Tianjin	Women's doubles
Bronze medal – third place	2013 Tianjin	Mixed doubles
World Junior Championships
Gold medal – first place	2013 Bangkok	Girls' doubles
Gold medal – first place	2013 Bangkok	Mixed team
Silver medal – second place	2011 Taipei	Mixed team
Bronze medal – third place	2011 Taipei	Mixed doubles
Bronze medal – third place	2012 Chiba	Mixed team
Bronze medal – third place	2013 Bangkok	Mixed doubles
Asian Junior Championships
Gold medal – first place	2012 Gimcheon	Mixed doubles
Gold medal – first place	2013 Kota Kinabalu	Mixed doubles
Silver medal – second place	2013 Kota Kinabalu	Mixed team
Bronze medal – third place	2012 Gimcheon	Mixed team
Bronze medal – third place	2013 Kota Kinabalu	Girls' doubles

- Chae Yoo-jung
- Hangul: 채유정
- Hanja: 蔡侑玎
- RR: Chae Yujeong
- MR: Ch'ae Yujŏng

Chae Yoo-jung (Korean: 채유정; Hanja: 蔡侑玎; born 9 May 1995) is a South Korean badminton player who is affiliated with Incheon International Airport team. She is the daughter of former singles player Kim Bok-sun. She won the mixed doubles title at the 2023 World Championships. Chae was a part of the Korean national team that won the world mixed team championships at the 2017 Sudirman Cup.

== Career ==
Chae started playing badminton in 2005, affected by her mother Kim Bok-sun, who is also a South Korean badminton player. She entered the national team in 2011, and made her debut in the international tournament at the 2011 BWF World Junior Championships, winning a silver medal in the team event, a bronze medal in the mixed doubles, and a quarter-finalists in the girls' doubles. She has shown good progress in her junior career, where she and her partner, Choi Sol-gyu, managed to win the mixed doubles title at the Asian Junior Championships, and finished runner-up in the Korea Junior Open.

Chae competed at the 2020 Summer Olympics in the mixed doubles partnered with Seo Seung-jae, and her pace was stopped in the quarter-finals.

In 2023, Chae impressed the international stage, when she seized the mixed doubles title in the World Championships with partner Seo Seung-jae. This achievement was Chae and Seo's first victory over the world number 1 pair Zheng Siwei and Huang Yaqiong. She also secured her first ever Super 1000 title at the China Open with a second consecutive victory over Zheng and Huang at the quarter-finals. Chae joined the South Korean women's team that won the gold medal at the Asian Games, and settled the bronze medal in the mixed doubles, while with Korean mixed team at the Sudirman Cup she won the silver medal. Another results that she achieved in the season of 2023 was winning the Korea Masters; runners-up in the Thailand Masters, All England Open, and China Masters; lead she and her partner qualified for the World Tour Finals, where the duo finished in the semi-finals at that tournament. She closed the year ranked as world number 3 in the mixed doubles.

In 2025, Chae announced via her personal Instagram that she would retire from the national team and international competitions.

In 2026, after retiring, Chae joined the Victor ZSwing International Badminton Academy in China as a coach.

== Achievements ==
=== World Championships ===
Mixed doubles
Year	Venue	Partner	Opponent	Score	Result
2023	Royal Arena, Copenhagen, Denmark	(South Korea) Seo Seung-jae	(China) Zheng Siwei (China) Huang Yaqiong	21–17, 10–21, 21–18	Gold

=== Asian Games ===
Mixed doubles
Year	Venue	Partner	Opponent	Score	Result
2022	Binjiang Gymnasium, Hangzhou, China	(South Korea) Seo Seung-jae	(China) Zheng Siwei (China) Huang Yaqiong	21–13, 15–21, 16–21	Bronze

=== Asian Championships ===
Mixed doubles
Year	Venue	Partner	Opponent	Score	Result
2016	Wuhan Sports Center Gymnasium, Wuhan, China	(South Korea) Shin Baek-cheol	(Indonesia) Tontowi Ahmad (Indonesia) Liliyana Natsir	16–21, 13–21	Bronze
2024	Ningbo Olympic Sports Center Gymnasium, Ningbo, China	(South Korea) Seo Seung-jae	(China) Feng Yanzhe (China) Huang Dongping	21–13, 15–21, 14–21	Silver

=== East Asian Games ===
Women's doubles
Year	Venue	Partner	Opponent	Score	Result
2013	Binhai New Area Dagang Gymnasium, Tianjin, China	(South Korea) Kim Ji-won	(Japan) Yuriko Miki (Japan) Koharu Yonemoto	15–21, 18–21	Bronze

Mixed doubles
Year	Venue	Partner	Opponent	Score	Result
2013	Binhai New Area Dagang Gymnasium, Tianjin, China	(South Korea) Choi Sol-gyu	(China) Xu Chen (China) Ma Jin	10–21, 15–21	Bronze

=== World Junior Championships ===
Girls' doubles
Year	Venue	Partner	Opponent	Score	Result
2013	Hua Mark Indoor Stadium, Bangkok, Thailand	(South Korea) Kim Ji-won	(China) Chen Qingchen (China) He Jiaxin	21–19, 21–15	Gold

Mixed doubles
Year	Venue	Partner	Opponent	Score	Result
2011	Taoyuan Arena, Taoyuan City, Taipei, Taiwan	(South Korea) Choi Sol-gyu	(Indonesia) Alfian Eko Prasetya (Indonesia) Gloria Emanuelle Widjaja	18–21, 13–21	Bronze
2013	Hua Mark Indoor Stadium, Bangkok, Thailand	(South Korea) Choi Sol-gyu	(China) Huang Kaixiang (China) Chen Qingchen	13–21, 11–21	Bronze

=== Asian Junior Championships ===
Girls' doubles
Year	Venue	Partner	Opponent	Score	Result
2013	Likas Indoor Stadium, Kota Kinabalu, Malaysia	(South Korea) Kim Ji-won	(China) Chen Qingchen (China) He Jiaxin	7–21, 21–19, 11–21	Bronze

Mixed doubles
Year	Venue	Partner	Opponent	Score	Result
2012	Gimcheon Indoor Stadium, Gimcheon, South Korea	(South Korea) Choi Sol-gyu	(China) Liu Yuchen (China) Huang Dongping	21–11, 19–21, 21–13	Gold
2013	Likas Indoor Stadium, Kota Kinabalu, Malaysia	(South Korea) Choi Sol-gyu	(China) Wang Yilyu (China) Huang Dongping	17–21, 25–23, 23–21	Gold

=== BWF World Tour (6 titles, 9 runners-up) ===
The BWF World Tour, which was announced on 19 March 2017 and implemented in 2018, is a series of elite badminton tournaments sanctioned by the Badminton World Federation (BWF). The BWF World Tours are divided into levels of World Tour Finals, Super 1000, Super 750, Super 500, Super 300 (part of the HSBC World Tour), and the BWF Tour Super 100.

Mixed doubles
Year	Tournament	Level	Partner	Opponent	Score	Result
2018	New Zealand Open	Super 300	(South Korea) Seo Seung-jae	(Chinese Taipei) Wang Chi-lin (Chinese Taipei) Lee Chia-hsin	19–21, 21–14, 19–21	(silver) Runner-up
2018	Australian Open	Super 300	(South Korea) Seo Seung-jae	(Malaysia) Chan Peng Soon (Malaysia) Goh Liu Ying	21–12, 23–21	(gold) Winner
2018	French Open	Super 750	(South Korea) Seo Seung-jae	(China) Zheng Siwei (China) Huang Yaqiong	19–21, 14–21	(silver) Runner-up
2019	Spain Masters	Super 300	(South Korea) Seo Seung-jae	(Chinese Taipei) Wang Chi-lin (Chinese Taipei) Cheng Chi-ya	21–18, 21–15	(gold) Winner
2019	German Open	Super 300	(South Korea) Seo Seung-jae	(Indonesia) Hafiz Faizal (Indonesia) Gloria Emanuelle Widjaja	21–17, 21–11	(gold) Winner
2019	Chinese Taipei Open	Super 300	(South Korea) Seo Seung-jae	(Hong Kong) Tang Chun Man (Hong Kong) Tse Ying Suet	18–21, 10–21	(silver) Runner-up
2020 (II)	Thailand Open	Super 1000	(South Korea) Seo Seung-jae	(Thailand) Dechapol Puavaranukroh (Thailand) Sapsiree Taerattanachai	16–21, 20–22	(silver) Runner-up
2020	BWF World Tour Finals	World Tour Finals	(South Korea) Seo Seung-jae	(Thailand) Dechapol Puavaranukroh (Thailand) Sapsiree Taerattanachai	18–21, 21–8, 8–21	(silver) Runner-up
2022	Australian Open	Super 300	(South Korea) Seo Seung-jae	(South Korea) Kim Won-ho (South Korea) Jeong Na-eun	21–9, 21–17	(gold) Winner
2023	Thailand Masters	Super 300	(South Korea) Seo Seung-jae	(China) Feng Yanzhe (China) Huang Dongping	21–18, 15–21, 12–21	(silver) Runner-up
2023	All England Open	Super 1000	(South Korea) Seo Seung-jae	(China) Zheng Siwei (China) Huang Yaqiong	16–21, 21–16, 12–21	(silver) Runner-up
2023	China Open	Super 1000	(South Korea) Seo Seung-jae	(France) Thom Gicquel (France) Delphine Delrue	21–19, 21–12	(gold) Winner
2023	Korea Masters	Super 300	(South Korea) Seo Seung-jae	(China) Jiang Zhenbang (China) Wei Yaxin	21–14, 21–15	(gold) Winner
2023	China Masters	Super 750	(South Korea) Seo Seung-jae	(China) Zheng Siwei (China) Huang Yaqiong	10–21, 11–21	(silver) Runner-up
2024	French Open	Super 750	(South Korea) Seo Seung-jae	(China) Feng Yanzhe (China) Huang Dongping	16–21, 16–21	(silver) Runner-up

=== BWF Grand Prix (4 titles, 8 runners-up) ===
The BWF Grand Prix had two levels, the Grand Prix and Grand Prix Gold. It was a series of badminton tournaments sanctioned by the Badminton World Federation (BWF) and played between 2007 and 2017.

Women's doubles
Year	Tournament	Partner	Opponent	Score	Result
2016	Indonesian Masters	(South Korea) Kim So-yeong	(Thailand) Jongkolphan Kititharakul (Thailand) Rawinda Prajongjai	21–18, 22–20	(gold) Winner
2016	Korea Masters	(South Korea) Kim So-yeong	(South Korea) Jung Kyung-eun (South Korea) Shin Seung-chan	14–21, 14–21	(silver) Runner-up
2017	Chinese Taipei Open	(South Korea) Kim So-yeong	(South Korea) Kim Hye-rin (South Korea) Yoo Hae-won	21–12, 21–11	(gold) Winner

Mixed doubles
Year	Tournament	Partner	Opponent	Score	Result
2013	Macau Open	(South Korea) Choi Sol-gyu	(China) Lu Kai (China) Huang Yaqiong	21–17, 18–21, 17–21	(silver) Runner-up
2013	Vietnam Open	(South Korea) Choi Sol-gyu	(Chinese Taipei) Liao Min-chun (Chinese Taipei) Chen Hsiao-huan	22–20, 19–21, 21–14	(gold) Winner
2015	Chinese Taipei Open	(South Korea) Shin Baek-cheol	(South Korea) Ko Sung-hyun (South Korea) Kim Ha-na	16–21, 18–21	(silver) Runner-up
2015	Vietnam Open	(South Korea) Choi Sol-gyu	(China) Huang Kaixiang (China) Huang Dongping	19–21, 12–21	(silver) Runner-up
2015	Korea Masters	(South Korea) Shin Baek-cheol	(South Korea) Ko Sung-hyun (South Korea) Kim Ha-na	21–19, 17–21, 19–21	(silver) Runner-up
2015	Macau Open	(South Korea) Shin Baek-cheol	(South Korea) Choi Sol-gyu (South Korea) Eom Hye-won	21–18, 21–13	(gold) Winner
2016	German Open	(South Korea) Shin Baek-cheol	(South Korea) Ko Sung-hyun (South Korea) Kim Ha-na	19–21, 12–21	(silver) Runner-up
2017	Canada Open	(South Korea) Choi Sol-gyu	(South Korea) Kim Won-ho (South Korea) Shin Seung-chan	19–21, 16–21	(silver) Runner-up
2017	Korea Masters	(South Korea) Choi Sol-gyu	(South Korea) Seo Seung-jae (South Korea) Kim Ha-na	21–17, 13–21, 18–21	(silver) Runner-up

BWF Grand Prix Gold tournament
BWF Grand Prix tournament

=== BWF International Challenge/Series (1 title, 2 runners-up) ===
Women's doubles
Year	Tournament	Partner	Opponent	Score	Result
2015	Thailand International	(South Korea) Kim Ji-won	(Thailand) Duanganong Aroonkesorn (Thailand) Kunchala Voravichitchaikul	17–21, 19–21	(silver) Runner-up

Mixed doubles
Year	Tournament	Partner	Opponent	Score	Result
2014	Osaka International	(South Korea) Choi Sol-gyu	(Indonesia) Muhammad Rijal (Indonesia) Vita Marissa	18–21, 21–17, 18–21	(silver) Runner-up
2015	Thailand International	(South Korea) Choi Sol-gyu	(Malaysia) Tan Chee Tean (Malaysia) Shevon Jemie Lai	18–21, 21–19, 21–12	(gold) Winner

BWF International Challenge tournament
BWF International Series tournament
