= Huang Dongping =

Chinese badminton player (born 1995)

Huang Dongping 黄东萍
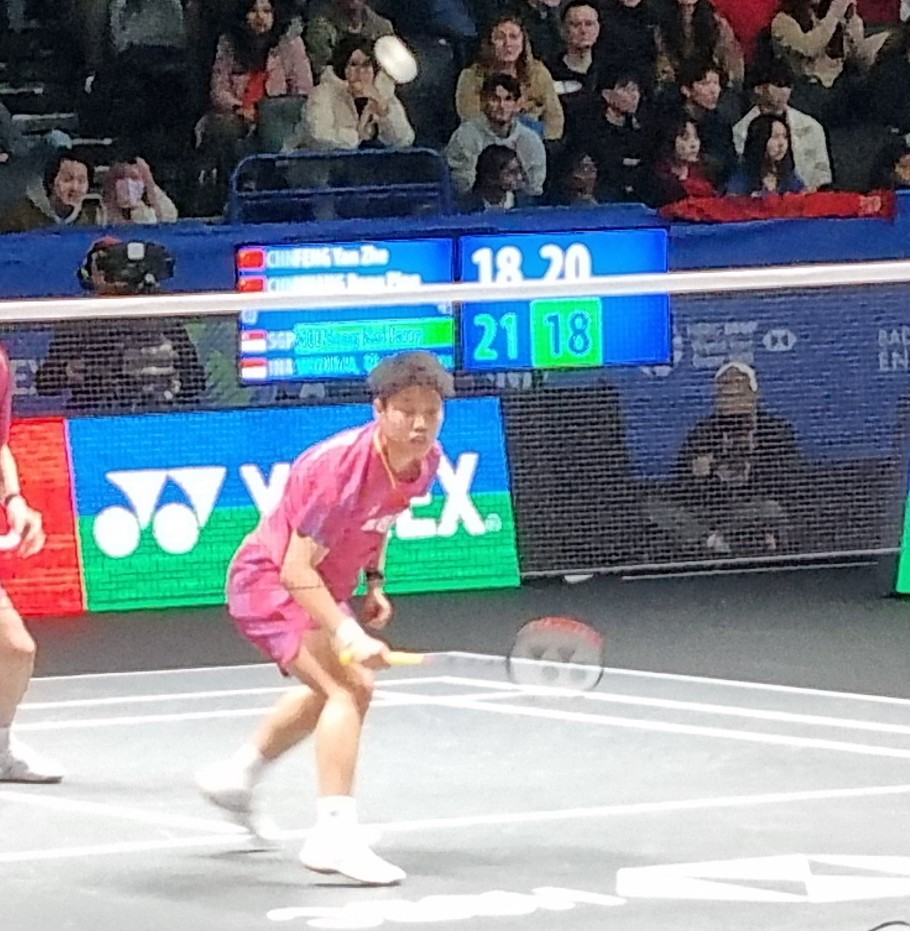

Personal information
- Born: 30 April 1995 (age 31) Nan'an, Fujian, China
- Height: 1.65 m (5 ft 5 in)

Sport
- Country: China
- Sport: Badminton
- Handedness: Right

Women's & mixed doubles
- Highest ranking: 6 (WD with Li Yinhui, 24 August 2017); 1 (XD with Wang Yilyu, 12 April 2018); 1 (XD with Feng Yanzhe, 26 November 2024)
- Current ranking: 1 (XD with Feng Yanzhe, 6 October 2026)
- BWF profile
Medal record
Women's badminton
Representing China
Olympic Games
Gold medal – first place	2020 Tokyo	Mixed doubles
World Championships
Silver medal – second place	2018 Nanjing	Mixed doubles
Silver medal – second place	2026 New Dehli	Mixed doubles
Bronze medal – third place	2019 Basel	Mixed doubles
Bronze medal – third place	2022 Tokyo	Mixed doubles
Sudirman Cup
Gold medal – first place	2019 Nanning	Mixed team
Gold medal – first place	2021 Vantaa	Mixed team
Gold medal – first place	2023 Suzhou	Mixed team
Gold medal – first place	2025 Xiamen	Mixed team
Silver medal – second place	2017 Gold Coast	Mixed team
Uber Cup
Gold medal – first place	2020 Aarhus	Women's team
Silver medal – second place	2022 Bangkok	Women's team
Bronze medal – third place	2018 Bangkok	Women's team
Asian Games
Gold medal – first place	2026 Aichi–Nagoya	Women's team
Silver medal – second place	2018 Jakarta–Palembang	Women's team
Silver medal – second place	2022 Hangzhou	Women's team
Bronze medal – third place	2018 Jakarta–Palembang	Mixed doubles
Bronze medal – third place	2022 Hangzhou	Mixed doubles
Bronze medal – third place	2026 Aichi–Nagoya	Mixed doubles
Asian Championships
Gold medal – first place	2018 Wuhan	Mixed doubles
Gold medal – first place	2019 Wuhan	Mixed doubles
Gold medal – first place	2024 Ningbo	Mixed doubles
Silver medal – second place	2022 Manila	Mixed doubles
Bronze medal – third place	2017 Wuhan	Women's doubles
Bronze medal – third place	2017 Wuhan	Mixed doubles
Bronze medal – third place	2026 Ningbo	Mixed doubles
Asia Mixed Team Championships
Gold medal – first place	2023 Dubai	Mixed team
Bronze medal – third place	2017 Ho Chi Minh	Mixed team
World Junior Championships
Gold medal – first place	2012 Chiba	Mixed team
Bronze medal – third place	2013 Bangkok	Girls' doubles
Bronze medal – third place	2013 Bangkok	Mixed doubles
Bronze medal – third place	2013 Bangkok	Mixed team
Asian Junior Championships
Gold medal – first place	2013 Kota Kinabalu	Girls' doubles
Gold medal – first place	2013 Kota Kinabalu	Mixed team
Silver medal – second place	2012 Gimcheon	Mixed doubles
Silver medal – second place	2012 Gimcheon	Mixed team
Silver medal – second place	2013 Kota Kinabalu	Mixed doubles

Huang Dongping (Chinese: 黄东萍; pinyin: Huáng Dōngpíng; born 30 April 1995) is a Chinese badminton player. She is the mixed doubles Olympic Champion at the 2020 Summer Olympics, and was three-time mixed doubles Asian Champion, winning in 2018, 2019 and 2024. Huang was ranked first in the mixed doubles with two different partners. Together with Wang Yilyu, she achieved the world no. 1 in April 2018, and with Feng Yanzhe in November 2024.

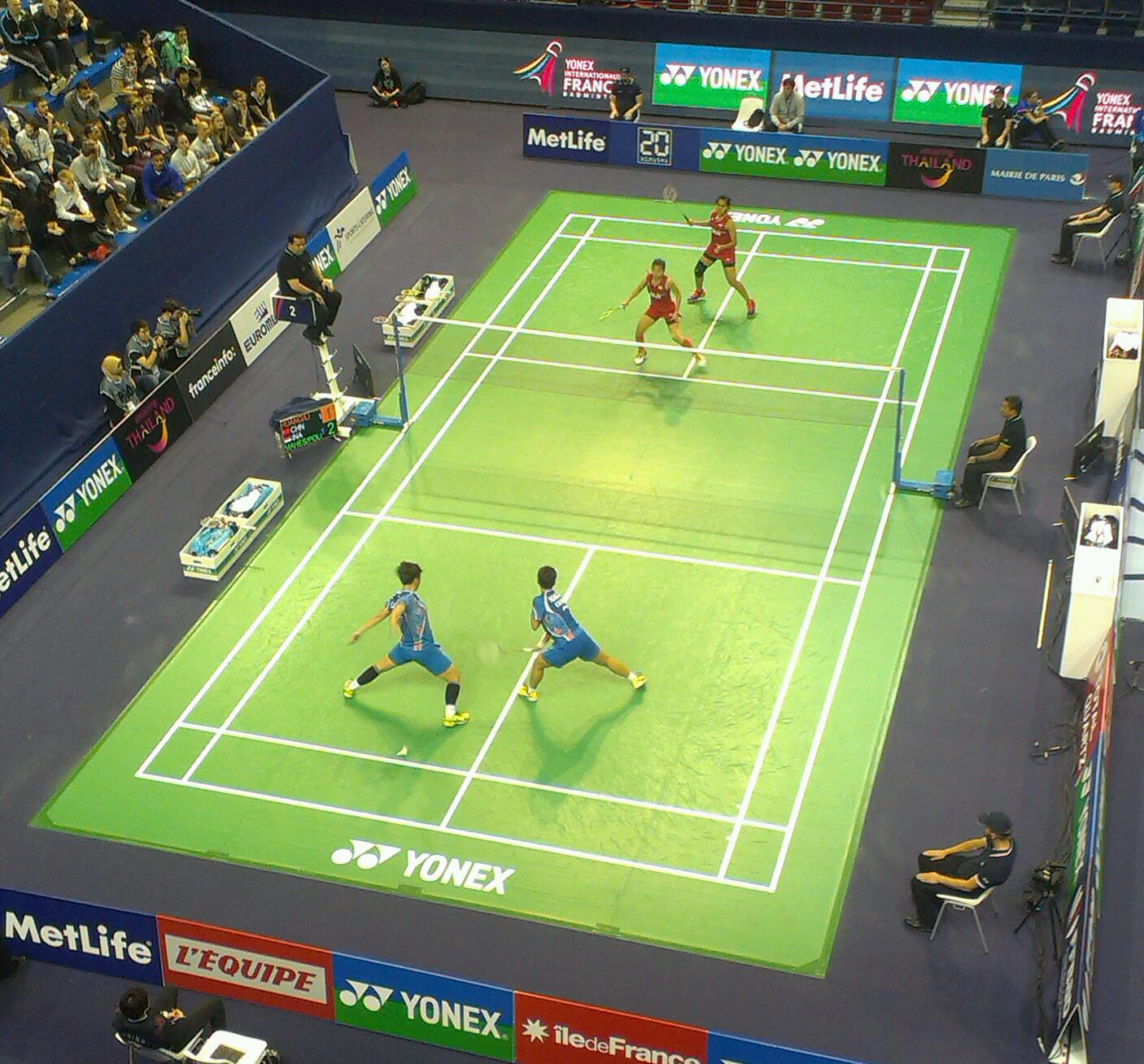
Huang Dongping (lower right corner) in the 2016 French Super Series

== Career ==
=== Early career ===
Huang entered the of Nan'an Sports School for training in September 2002, and was transferred to the Fujian Provincial Youth Sports School in September 2005. She joined the Provincial Sports team in March 2006. In 2011, she was selected by the renowned coach Tang Xianhu and entered the National second team. During her junior years, she was selected to represent her country at the 2012 Asian Junior Championships, where she captured two silver medals in the mixed doubles and team events. At the 2013 Australian Open in April, Huang and partner Chen Qingchen reached the semi-finals, but was defeated by Savitree Amitrapai and Sapsiree Taerattanachai. In that competition Huang received a yellow card for misconduct. Huang impressed in her second appearance at the Asian Junior Championships in 2013, winning two gold medals in the girls' doubles and team events, along with a silver in the mixed doubles. At the World Junior Championships, she won three bronzes in the girls' doubles, mixed doubles and team events. At the age of 18, Huang also reached the finals in the Grand Prix Gold event in Indonesia, where she and Jia Yifan lost to Luo Ying and Luo Yu in a close rubber games.

=== 2014–2016: First Grand Prix Gold title ===
Partnered with Liu Yuchen in the mixed doubles, Huang finished runner-up in the 2015 Osaka International. She won her first ever senior title in the 2015 U.S. Open, when she and Huang Kaixiang beating Lee Chun Hei and Chau Hoi Wah in the final. The duo later won the Vietnam Open. Together with Li Yinhui in the women's doubles, they clinched the Thailand Open title. Her momentum carried into 2016, by clinching the women's doubles title at the Chinese Taipei Open alongside partner Zhong Qianxin. Beyond this victory, she proved her capability at the elite level by reaching the finals of two Superseries tournaments, finishing as the runner-up in the women's doubles at both the China and the Hong Kong Open with Li Yinhui. Reresenting Huaqiao University at the 2016 World University Championships in Russia, Huang won the silver medal in the team event, and with her partner Du Peng in the women's doubles, she managed to win the gold medal.

=== 2017: First Superseries title ===
In 2017, Huang Dongping maintained a high level of performance throughout the international circuit, beginning with a bronze medal at the Asia Mixed Team Championships in February. This was followed by a runner-up finish at the German Open and a title victory at the China Masters. In April, she secured two bronze medals in both the mixed and women's doubles at the Asian Championships. She later contributed to China's silver medal finish at the Sudirman Cup. Her successful season continued into September, where she finished as the runner-up at the Korea Open before clinching the championship title at the Japan Open. Huang and Wang qualified to compete at the Dubai World Superseries Finals, but was eliminated in the semi-finals to Tang Chun Man and Tse Ying Suet.

=== 2018: Asian Championships gold, World Championships silver, World Tour Finals title and World #1 ===
In 2018, Huang delivered a remarkably consistent season, beginning in March with a runner-up finish in women's doubles alongside Zheng Yu at the German Open. In April, she reached the women's doubles final at the Lingshui China Masters with Li Wenmei before clinching the mixed doubles gold medal at the Asian Championships with Wang Yilyu, and reached the world number 1 ranking in the mixed doubles for the first time in her career. This was followed by a bronze medal at the Uber Cup in May and a mixed doubles runner-up finish at the Malaysia Open in June. In August, she secured a silver medal at the World Championships. Subsequently, she earned both a team silver medal and an individual mixed doubles bronze at the Asian Games in Jakarta. Throughout the remainder of the year, she achieved three additional runner-up finishes in mixed doubles at the Japan Open, Fuzhou China Open, and Hong Kong Open, totaling six World Tour runner-up finishes at that year. She concluded the year by qualifying for the BWF World Tour Finals, where she won the championship title alongside Wang Yilyu.

=== 2019: Second Asian Championships gold, World Championships bronze, and Sudirman Cup title ===
In 2019, Huang, maintaining a high level of consistency throughout the BWF World Tour with Wang Yilyu. The duo enjoyed a stellar mid-season run, capturing titles at the India Open, Asian Championships, and Australian Open, followed by victories at the Japan Open, Thailand Open and Fuzhou China Open. Their season was defined by a persistent rivalry with compatriots Zheng Siwei and Huang Yaqiong; the two pairs met six times in 2019, with Huang and Wang often pushing the world number ones to the limit. While they celebrated several titles, they also recorded runner-up finishes at the Malaysia Open, Indonesia Open, and China Open after narrow defeats to their teammates. Additionally, Huang faced a fierce challenge from Praveen Jordan and Melati Daeva Oktavianti, meeting them five time throughout the year. These encounters were particularly intense during the European leg, where Huang finished as a runner-up at the Denmark Open and suffered a close quarter-final loss at the French Open to the Indonesian pair. Beyond the circuit, Huang was pivotal in China's Sudirman Cup victory, earned a bronze medal at the World Championships, before reaching the final of the BWF World Tour Finals.

=== 2020–2021: Olympic Champion, first Uber Cup, and second Sudirman Cup title ===
Huang's 2020 campaign began with consecutive runner-up finishes at the Malaysia and Indonesia Masters with Wang Yilyu. Her success reached its peak in mid-2021 when she competed at the 2020 Summer Olympics partnering with Wang as the second seeds. The duo won a gold medal after beating their compatriots Zheng Siwei and Huang Yaqiong in the final in a close rubber game. Following her Olympic triumph, she contributed to China's Sudirman Cup victory before playing a crucial role in the Uber Cup final, where she and Li Wenmei secured the winning point as the deciding women's doubles pair. She concluded this remarkable run by clinching the women's doubles title at the Denmark Open with Zheng Yu.

=== 2022–2023: From Wang Yilyu to Feng Yanzhe ===
In 2022, Huang Dongping navigated a busy transitional year, beginning with her long-time partner Wang Yilyu. The duo secured a runner-up finish at the All England Open and a silver medal at the Asian Championships, before capturing the title at the Korea Masters. Despite reaching the finals of the Singapore Open, contributing to a silver medal in the Uber Cup, and earning a bronze at the World Championships, Wang's persistent injuries led to a tactical shift. In October, Huang began a trial partnership with Feng Yanzhe, immediately proving their potential by finishing as runners-up at both the Denmark and the Hylo Open.

The 2023 season began with a notable appearance at the India Open, where Huang teamed up with Wang Yilyu for one of their final tournaments together; however, they were forced to withdraw from the final and settle for a runner-up finish because Wang suffered from a stomach infection. Following this event, Huang transitioned permanently to Feng Yanzhe, sparking a dominant run that included titles at the Indonesia Masters, Thailand Masters, German Open, Korea Open, Australian Open, Arctic Open, and Denmark Open. Huang also remained a cornerstone for the national team, clinching gold at the Asia Mixed Team Championships and the Sudirman Cup. Huang also competed in Hangzhou Asian Games, earning a silver medal in the women's team event and a bronze in the mixed doubles. Despite finishing as the runner-up at the Malaysia and Japan Masters, Huang and Feng qualified to the BWF World Tour Finals, finishing as runner-up.

=== 2024: Third Asian Championships gold, and World #1 with Feng Yanzhe ===
Huang's 2024 season was defined by exceptional consistency alongside Feng Yanzhe, beginning with a title at the French Open in March, and a gold medal at the Asian Championships in April. Following a quarter-final exit at the Paris 2024 Olympics, she returned to top form in September, finishing as the runner-up at the Hong Kong Open before capturing the China Open title. Her momentum accelerated in October as she defended her titles at both the Arctic and Denmark Open, followed by a victory at the China Masters in November. These cumulative successes culminated in her reaching the World No. 1 ranking on 26 November 2024. However, despite finishing second in the BWF World Tour standings, she and Feng missed the World Tour Finals due to the two-pair-per-country limit, as teammates Zheng Siwei and Huang Yaqiong qualified as World Champions while Jiang Zhenbang and Wei Yaxin secured the top ranking spot.

=== 2025: Second World Tour Finals title ===
Huang's 2025 season began in January with a runner-up finish at the Malaysia Open, followed by a triumphant campaign at the Sudirman Cup with the national team in May. Her momentum accelerated with consecutive titles at the Thailand Open and Malaysia Masters, after which she successfully defended her crown at the China Open in July. In September, she continued her dominant run by capturing both the Hong Kong and Korea Open titles. During the intensive October swing, despite finishing as a runner-up at the Arctic Open, she made history by securing her third consecutive Denmark Open title and successfully defending her French Open title. Finally, Huang achieved a major career milestone in December by winning the BWF World Tour Finals, her first time doing so with Feng Yanzhe.

=== 2026: First Malaysia Open title, third Asian Championships bronze ===
Huang's started the year with a great feat when she and Feng managed to win the Malaysia Open against compatriot Jiang Zhenbang and Wei Yaxin. Next week, they were beaten by the Thai pair of Dechapol Puavaranukroh and Supissara Paewsampran at the semifinal of India Open. In March, They were surprisingly beaten by the Danish pair of Mads Vestergaard and Christine Busch in the round of 16 of the All England Open. One month later, they were playing at the Asian Championships and snatched the bronze medal after losing against Puavaranukroh and Paewsampran again in the semi final bout. Huang and Feng back to winning ways at the Australian Open in June when they beated their other compatriot, Guo Xinwa and Chen Fanghui and reclaimed their title there since 2023. Huang and Feng continued their domination for the season as they won their third World Tour title of the year at the Japan Open against the Hong Kong's pair of Tang Chun Man and Tse Ying Suet in three games.

== Achievements ==
=== Olympic Games ===
Mixed doubles
Year	Venue	Partner	Opponent	Score	Result	Ref.
2020	Musashino Forest Sport Plaza, Tokyo, Japan	(China) Wang Yilyu	(China) Zheng Siwei (China) Huang Yaqiong	21–17, 17–21, 21–19	Gold	

=== World Championships ===
Mixed doubles
Year	Venue	Partner	Opponent	Score	Result	Ref.
2018	Nanjing Youth Olympic Sports Park, Nanjing, China	(China) Wang Yilyu	(China) Zheng Siwei (China) Huang Yaqiong	17–21, 19–21	Silver	
2019	St. Jakobshalle, Basel, Switzerland	(China) Wang Yilyu	(Thailand) Dechapol Puavaranukroh (Thailand) Sapsiree Taerattanachai	16–21, 16–21	Bronze	
2022	Tokyo Metropolitan Gymnasium, Tokyo, Japan	(China) Wang Yilyu	(China) Zheng Siwei (China) Huang Yaqiong	16–21, 21–12, 10–21	Bronze	
2026	Indira Gandhi Arena, New Delhi, India	(China) Feng Yanzhe	(France) Thom Gicquel (France) Delphine Delrue	20–22, 21–19, 15–21	Silver	

=== Asian Games ===
Mixed doubles
Year	Venue	Partner	Opponent	Score	Result	Ref.
2018	Istora Gelora Bung Karno, Jakarta, Indonesia	(China) Wang Yilyu	(Hong Kong) Tang Chun Man (Hong Kong) Tse Ying Suet	20–22, 21–19, 21–23	Bronze	
2022	Binjiang Gymnasium, Hangzhou, China	(China) Feng Yanzhe	(Japan) Yuta Watanabe (Japan) Arisa Higashino	21–11, 20–22, 17–21	Bronze	
2026	Ichinomiya City Municipal Gymnasium, Ichinomiya, Japan	(China) Feng Yanzhe	(Indonesia) Amri Syahnawi (Indonesia) Nita Violina Marwah	12–21, 14–21	Bronze	

=== Asian Championships ===
Women's doubles
Year	Venue	Partner	Opponent	Score	Result	Ref.
2017	Wuhan Sports Center Gymnasium, Wuhan, China	(China) Li Yinhui	(South Korea) Kim Hye-rin (South Korea) Yoo Hae-won	13–21, 17–21	Bronze	

Mixed doubles
Year	Venue	Partner	Opponent	Score	Result	Ref.
2017	Wuhan Sports Center Gymnasium, Wuhan, China	(China) Wang Yilyu	(Thailand) Dechapol Puavaranukroh (Thailand) Sapsiree Taerattanachai	19–21, 16–21	Bronze	
2018	Wuhan Sports Center Gymnasium, Wuhan, China	(China) Wang Yilyu	(Indonesia) Tontowi Ahmad (Indonesia) Liliyana Natsir	21–17, 21–17	Gold	
2019	Wuhan Sports Center Gymnasium, Wuhan, China	(China) Wang Yilyu	(China) He Jiting (China) Du Yue	21–11, 13–21, 23–21	Gold	
2022	Muntinlupa Sports Complex, Metro Manila, Philippines	(China) Wang Yilyu	(China) Zheng Siwei (China) Huang Yaqiong	17–21, 8–21	Silver	
2024	Ningbo Olympic Sports Center Gymnasium, Ningbo, China	(China) Feng Yanzhe	(South Korea) Seo Seung-jae (South Korea) Chae Yoo-jung	13–21, 21–15, 21–14	Gold	
2026	Ningbo Olympic Sports Center Gymnasium, Ningbo, China	(China) Feng Yanzhe	(Thailand) Dechapol Puavaranukroh (Thailand) Supissara Paewsampran	19–21, 21–18, 20–22	Bronze	

=== World Junior Championships ===
Girls' doubles
Year	Venue	Partner	Opponent	Score	Result	Ref.
2013	Hua Mark Indoor Stadium, Bangkok, Thailand	(China) Jia Yifan	(South Korea) Chae Yoo-jung (South Korea) Kim Ji-won	20–22, 21–16, 20–22	Bronze	

Mixed doubles
Year	Venue	Partner	Opponent	Score	Result	Ref.
2013	Hua Mark Indoor Stadium, Bangkok, Thailand	(China) Liu Yuchen	(Indonesia) Kevin Sanjaya Sukamuljo (Indonesia) Masita Mahmudin	21–6, 17–21, 19–21	Bronze	

=== Asian Junior Championships ===
Girls' doubles
Year	Venue	Partner	Opponent	Score	Result	Ref.
2013	Likas Indoor Stadium, Kota Kinabalu, Malaysia	(China) Jia Yifan	(China) Chen Qingchen (China) He Jiaxin	21–15, 21–14	Gold	

Mixed doubles
Year	Venue	Partner	Opponent	Score	Result	Ref.
2012	Gimcheon Indoor Stadium, Gimcheon, South Korea	(China) Wang Yilyu	(South Korea) Choi Sol-gyu (South Korea) Chae Yoo-jung	21–17, 23–25, 21–23	Silver	
2013	Likas Indoor Stadium, Kota Kinabalu, Malaysia	(China) Liu Yuchen	(South Korea) Choi Sol-gyu (South Korea) Chae Yoo-jung	11–21, 21–19, 13–21	Silver	

=== BWF World Tour (34 titles, 26 runners-up) ===
The BWF World Tour, which was announced on 19 March 2017, and implemented in 2018, is a series of elite badminton tournaments sanctioned by the Badminton World Federation (BWF). The BWF World Tour is divided into levels of World Tour Finals, Super 1000, Super 750, Super 500, Super 300 (part of the BWF World Tour), and the BWF Tour Super 100.

Women's doubles
Year	Tournament	Level	Partner	Opponent	Score	Result	Ref.
2018	German Open	Super 300	(China) Zheng Yu	(Japan) Yuki Fukushima (Japan) Sayaka Hirota	21–18, 14–21, 6–21	(silver) Runner-up	
2018	Lingshui China Masters	Super 100	(China) Li Wenmei	(China) Du Yue (China) Li Yinhui	16–21, 17–21	(silver) Runner-up	
2021	Denmark Open	Super 1000	(China) Zheng Yu	(South Korea) Lee So-hee (South Korea) Shin Seung-chan	21–15, 21–17	(gold) Winner	

Mixed doubles
Year	Tournament	Level	Partner	Opponent	Score	Result	Ref.
2018	Malaysia Open	Super 750	(China) Wang Yilyu	(China) Zheng Siwei (China) Huang Yaqiong	19–21, 18–21	(silver) Runner-up	
2018	Japan Open	Super 750	(China) Wang Yilyu	(China) Zheng Siwei (China) Huang Yaqiong	19–21, 8–21	(silver) Runner-up	
2018	Fuzhou China Open	Super 750	(China) Wang Yilyu	(China) Zheng Siwei (China) Huang Yaqiong	15–21, 21–11, 19–21	(silver) Runner-up	
2018	Hong Kong Open	Super 500	(China) Wang Yilyu	(Japan) Yuta Watanabe (Japan) Arisa Higashino	18–21, 14–21	(silver) Runner-up	
2018	BWF World Tour Finals	World Tour Finals	(China) Wang Yilyu	(China) Zheng Siwei (China) Huang Yaqiong	23–21, 16–21, 21–18	(gold) Winner	
2019	India Open	Super 500	(China) Wang Yilyu	(Indonesia) Praveen Jordan (Indonesia) Melati Daeva Oktavianti	21–13, 21–11	(gold) Winner	
2019	Malaysia Open	Super 750	(China) Wang Yilyu	(China) Zheng Siwei (China) Huang Yaqiong	17–21, 13–21	(silver) Runner-up	
2019	Australian Open	Super 300	(China) Wang Yilyu	(Indonesia) Praveen Jordan (Indonesia) Melati Daeva Oktavianti	21–15, 21–8	(gold) Winner	
2019	Indonesia Open	Super 1000	(China) Wang Yilyu	(China) Zheng Siwei (China) Huang Yaqiong	13–21, 18–21	(silver) Runner-up	
2019	Japan Open	Super 750	(China) Wang Yilyu	(Indonesia) Praveen Jordan (Indonesia) Melati Daeva Oktavianti	21–17, 21–16	(gold) Winner	
2019	Thailand Open	Super 500	(China) Wang Yilyu	(Japan) Yuta Watanabe (Japan) Arisa Higashino	24–22, 23–21	(gold) Winner	
2019	China Open	Super 1000	(China) Wang Yilyu	(China) Zheng Siwei (China) Huang Yaqiong	17–21, 21–15, 16–21	(silver) Runner-up	
2019	Denmark Open	Super 750	(China) Wang Yilyu	(Indonesia) Praveen Jordan (Indonesia) Melati Daeva Oktavianti	18–21, 21–16, 19–21	(silver) Runner-up	
2019	Fuzhou China Open	Super 750	(China) Wang Yilyu	(China) Zheng Siwei (China) Huang Yaqiong	21–14, 21–13	(gold) Winner	
2019	BWF World Tour Finals	World Tour Finals	(China) Wang Yilyu	(China) Zheng Siwei (China) Huang Yaqiong	14–21, 14–21	(silver) Runner-up	
2020	Malaysia Masters	Super 500	(China) Wang Yilyu	(China) Zheng Siwei (China) Huang Yaqiong	19–21, 12–21	(silver) Runner-up	
2020	Indonesia Masters	Super 500	(China) Wang Yilyu	(China) Zheng Siwei (China) Huang Yaqiong	9–21, 9–21	(silver) Runner-up	
2022	All England Open	Super 1000	(China) Wang Yilyu	(Japan) Yuta Watanabe (Japan) Arisa Higashino	19–21, 19–21	(silver) Runner-up	
2022	Korea Masters	Super 300	(China) Wang Yilyu	(China) Ou Xuanyi (China) Huang Yaqiong	21–17, 21–17	(gold) Winner	
2022	Singapore Open	Super 500	(China) Wang Yilyu	(Thailand) Dechapol Puavaranukroh (Thailand) Sapsiree Taerattanachai	12–21, 17–21	(silver) Runner-up	
2022	Denmark Open	Super 750	(China) Feng Yanzhe	(China) Zheng Siwei (China) Huang Yaqiong	19–21, 22–20, 19–21	(silver) Runner-up	
2022	Hylo Open	Super 300	(China) Feng Yanzhe	(Indonesia) Rehan Naufal Kusharjanto (Indonesia) Lisa Ayu Kusumawati	17–21, 15–21	(silver) Runner-up	
2023	India Open	Super 750	(China) Wang Yilyu	(Japan) Yuta Watanabe (Japan) Arisa Higashino	Walkover	(silver) Runner-up	
2023	Indonesia Masters	Super 500	(China) Feng Yanzhe	(China) Jiang Zhenbang (China) Wei Yaxin	21–15, 16–21, 21–19	(gold) Winner	
2023	Thailand Masters	Super 300	(China) Feng Yanzhe	(South Korea) Seo Seung-jae (South Korea) Chae Yoo-jung	18–21, 21–15, 21–12	(gold) Winner	
2023	German Open	Super 300	(China) Feng Yanzhe	(South Korea) Kim Won-ho (South Korea) Jeong Na-eun	21–4, 21–15	(gold) Winner	
2023	Malaysia Masters	Super 500	(China) Feng Yanzhe	(Thailand) Dechapol Puavaranukroh (Thailand) Sapsiree Taerattanachai	21–16, 13–21, 18–21	(silver) Runner-up	
2023	Korea Open	Super 500	(China) Feng Yanzhe	(China) Jiang Zhenbang (China) Wei Yaxin	21–16, 21–13	(gold) Winner	
2023	Australian Open	Super 500	(China) Feng Yanzhe	(Japan) Hiroki Midorikawa (Japan) Natsu Saito	21–14, 16–21, 21–15	(gold) Winner	
2023	Arctic Open	Super 500	(China) Feng Yanzhe	(China) Jiang Zhenbang (China) Wei Yaxin	21–14, 21–15	(gold) Winner	
2023	Denmark Open	Super 750	(China) Feng Yanzhe	(China) Zheng Siwei (China) Huang Yaqiong	16–21, 21–15, 26–24	(gold) Winner	
2023	Japan Masters	Super 500	(China) Feng Yanzhe	(China) Zheng Siwei (China) Huang Yaqiong	23–25, 9–21	(silver) Runner-up	
2023	BWF World Tour Finals	World Tour Finals	(China) Feng Yanzhe	(China) Zheng Siwei (China) Huang Yaqiong	11–21, 18–21	(silver) Runner-up	
2024	French Open	Super 750	(China) Feng Yanzhe	(South Korea) Seo Seung-jae (South Korea) Chae Yoo-jung	21–16, 21–16	(gold) Winner	
2024	Hong Kong Open	Super 500	(China) Feng Yanzhe	(China) Jiang Zhenbang (China) Wei Yaxin	17–21, 19–21	(silver) Runner-up	
2024	China Open	Super 1000	(China) Feng Yanzhe	(Malaysia) Goh Soon Huat (Malaysia) Shevon Jemie Lai	16–21, 21–14, 21–17	(gold) Winner	
2024	Arctic Open	Super 500	(China) Feng Yanzhe	(China) Jiang Zhenbang (China) Wei Yaxin	21–18, 6–21, 21–15	(gold) Winner	
2024	Denmark Open	Super 750	(China) Feng Yanzhe	(China) Jiang Zhenbang (China) Wei Yaxin	15–21, 21–18, 21–17	(gold) Winner	
2024	China Masters	Super 750	(China) Feng Yanzhe	(Malaysia) Hoo Pang Ron (Malaysia) Cheng Su Yin	21–23, 25–23, 21–16	(gold) Winner	
2025	Malaysia Open	Super 1000	(China) Feng Yanzhe	(Thailand) Dechapol Puavaranukroh (Thailand) Supissara Paewsampran	13–21, 21–19, 18–21	(silver) Runner-up	
2025	Thailand Open	Super 500	(China) Feng Yanzhe	(China) Gao Jiaxuan (China) Wu Mengying	24–22, 21–16	(gold) Winner	
2025	Malaysia Masters	Super 500	(China) Feng Yanzhe	(China) Jiang Zhenbang (China) Wei Yaxin	21–17, 14–21, 21–16	(gold) Winner	
2025	China Open	Super 1000	(China) Feng Yanzhe	(China) Jiang Zhenbang (China) Wei Yaxin	23–21, 21–17	(gold) Winner	
2025	Hong Kong Open	Super 500	(China) Feng Yanzhe	(China) Guo Xinwa (China) Chen Fanghui	21–14, 21–14	(gold) Winner	
2025	Korea Open	Super 500	(China) Feng Yanzhe	(China) Jiang Zhenbang (China) Wei Yaxin	25–23, 21–11	(gold) Winner	
2025	Arctic Open	Super 500	(China) Feng Yanzhe	(China) Jiang Zhenbang (China) Wei Yaxin	19–21, 22–24	(silver) Runner-up	
2025	Denmark Open	Super 750	(China) Feng Yanzhe	(China) Jiang Zhenbang (China) Wei Yaxin	21–13, 21–9	(gold) Winner	
2025	French Open	Super 750	(China) Feng Yanzhe	(Thailand) Dechapol Puavaranukroh (Thailand) Supissara Paewsampran	27–25, 21–12	(gold) Winner	
2025	BWF World Tour Finals	World Tour Finals	(China) Feng Yanzhe	(China) Jiang Zhenbang (China) Wei Yaxin	21–12, 21–17	(gold) Winner	
2026	Malaysia Open	Super 1000	(China) Feng Yanzhe	(China) Jiang Zhenbang (China) Wei Yaxin	21–19, 21–19	(gold) Winner	
2026	Australian Open	Super 500	(China) Feng Yanzhe	(China) Guo Xinwa (China) Chen Fanghui	21–17, 21–19	(gold) Winner	
2026	Japan Open	Super 750	(China) Feng Yanzhe	(Hong Kong) Tang Chun Man (Hong Kong) Tse Ying Suet	21–14, 14–21, 21–15	(gold) Winner	
2026	China Open	Super 1000	(China) Feng Yanzhe	(China) Guo Xinwa (China) Chen Fanghui	23–25, 22–20, 15–21	(silver) Runner-up	
2026	China Masters	Super 750	(China) Feng Yanzhe	(Malaysia) Hoo Pang Ron (Malaysia) Lai Pei Jing	21–19, 21–16	(gold) Winner	
2026	Denmark Open	Super 750	(China) Feng Yanzhe	(China) Jiang Zhenbang (China) Wei Yaxin	18–21, 21–8, 16–21	(silver) Runner-up	
2026	French Open	Super 750	(China) Feng Yanzhe	(Malaysia) Hoo Pang Ron (Malaysia) Lai Pei Jing	21–10, 21–13	(gold) Winner	
2026	Hong Kong Open	Super 500	(China) Feng Yanzhe	(China) Jiang Zhenbang (China) Wei Yaxin	17–21, 21–9, 21–15	(gold) Winner	

=== BWF Superseries (1 title, 3 runners-up) ===
The BWF Superseries, which was launched on 14 December 2006, and implemented in 2007, was a series of elite badminton tournaments, sanctioned by the Badminton World Federation (BWF). BWF Superseries levels were Superseries and Superseries Premier. A season of Superseries consisted of twelve tournaments around the world that had been introduced since 2011. Successful players were invited to the Superseries Finals, which were held at the end of each year.

Women's doubles
Year	Tournament	Partner	Opponent	Score	Result	Ref.
2016	China Open	(China) Li Yinhui	(South Korea) Chang Ye-na (South Korea) Lee So-hee	21–13, 14–21, 17–21	(silver) Runner-up	
2016	Hong Kong Open	(China) Li Yinhui	(Denmark) Christinna Pedersen (Denmark) Kamilla Rytter Juhl	19–21, 10–21	(silver) Runner-up	

Mixed doubles
Year	Tournament	Partner	Opponent	Score	Result	Ref.
2017	Korea Open	(China) Wang Yilyu	(Indonesia) Praveen Jordan (Indonesia) Debby Susanto	17–21, 18–21	(silver) Runner-up	
2017	Japan Open	(China) Wang Yilyu	(Japan) Takuro Hoki (Japan) Sayaka Hirota	21–13, 21–8	(gold) Winner	

BWF Super Series Finals tournament
BWF Super Series Premier tournament
BWF Super Series tournament

=== BWF Grand Prix (5 titles, 2 runners-up) ===
The BWF Grand Prix had two levels, the Grand Prix and Grand Prix Gold. It was a series of badminton tournaments sanctioned by the Badminton World Federation (BWF) and played between 2007 and 2017.

Women's doubles
Year	Tournament	Partner	Opponent	Score	Result	Ref.
2013	Indonesia Grand Prix Gold	(China) Jia Yifan	(China) Luo Ying (China) Luo Yu	21–19, 15–21, 18–21	(silver) Runner-up	
2015	Thailand Open	(China) Li Yinhui	(South Korea) Chang Ye-na (South Korea) Lee So-hee	20–22, 21–11, 21–15	(gold) Winner	
2016	Chinese Taipei Open	(China) Zhong Qianxin	(China) Luo Ying (China) Luo Yu	21–18, 21–16	(gold) Winner	
2017	German Open	(China) Li Yinhui	(Japan) Yuki Fukushima (Japan) Sayaka Hirota	21–15, 17–21, 15–21	(silver) Runner-up	

Mixed doubles
Year	Tournament	Partner	Opponent	Score	Result	Ref.
2015	U.S. Open	(China) Huang Kaixiang	(Hong Kong) Lee Chun Hei (Hong Kong) Chau Hoi Wah	21–15, 21–14	(gold) Winner	
2015	Vietnam Open	(China) Huang Kaixiang	(South Korea) Choi Sol-gyu (South Korea) Chae Yoo-jung	21–19, 21–12	(gold) Winner	
2017	China Masters	(China) Wang Yilyu	(Chinese Taipei) Liao Min-chun (Chinese Taipei) Chen Hsiao-huan	21–14, 21–10	(gold) Winner	

BWF Grand Prix Gold tournament
BWF Grand Prix tournament

=== BWF International Challenge/Series (1 runner-up) ===
Mixed doubles
Year	Tournament	Partner	Opponent	Score	Result	Ref.
2015	Osaka International	(China) Liu Yuchen	(South Korea) Kim Duck-young (South Korea) Eom Hye-won	17–21, 21–16, 17–21	(silver) Runner-up	

BWF International Challenge tournament
BWF International Series tournament
