= Choi Sol-gyu =

South Korean badminton player

Choi Sol-gyu 최솔규
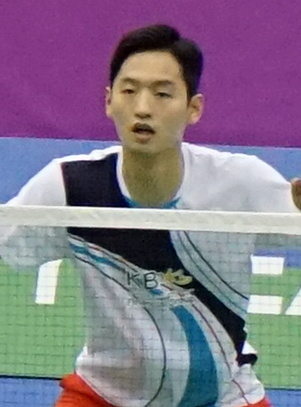
- Choi at the 2019 Chinese Taipei Open

Personal information
- Born: 5 August 1995 (age 31) Seoul, South Korea
- Height: 1.81 m (5 ft 11 in)

Sport
- Country: South Korea
- Sport: Badminton
- Handedness: Right

Men's & mixed doubles
- Highest ranking: 7 (MD with Seo Seung-jae, 19 November 2019); 9 (MD with Kim Won-ho, 3 January 2023); 11 (XD with Chae Yoo-jung, 21 September 2017)
- Current ranking: 46 (MD with Goh V Shem, 27 October 2026)
- BWF profile
Medal record
Men's badminton
Representing South Korea
Sudirman Cup
Gold medal – first place	2017 Gold Coast	Mixed team
Silver medal – second place	2023 Suzhou	Mixed team
Bronze medal – third place	2021 Vantaa	Mixed team
Asian Games
Silver medal – second place	2022 Hangzhou	Men's doubles
Bronze medal – third place	2022 Hangzhou	Men's team
Asia Mixed Team Championships
Silver medal – second place	2017 Ho Chi Minh	Mixed team
Asia Team Championships
Bronze medal – third place	2016 Hyderabad	Men's team
Bronze medal – third place	2018 Alor Setar	Men's team
East Asian Games
Bronze medal – third place	2013 Tianjin	Mixed doubles
World Junior Championships
Gold medal – first place	2013 Bangkok	Mixed team
Silver medal – second place	2011 Taipei	Mixed team
Bronze medal – third place	2011 Taipei	Mixed doubles
Bronze medal – third place	2012 Chiba	Mixed team
Bronze medal – third place	2013 Bangkok	Mixed doubles
Asian Junior Championships
Gold medal – first place	2012 Gimcheon	Mixed doubles
Gold medal – first place	2013 Kota Kinabalu	Mixed doubles
Silver medal – second place	2013 Kota Kinabalu	Mixed team
Bronze medal – third place	2012 Gimcheon	Mixed team

- Choi Sol-gyu
- Hangul: 최솔규
- Hanja: 催率圭
- RR: Choe Solgyu
- MR: Ch'oe Solgyu

Choi Sol-gyu (Korean: 최솔규; born 5 August 1995) is a South Korean badminton player. He was a part of the Korean national team that won the 2017 Sudirman Cup.

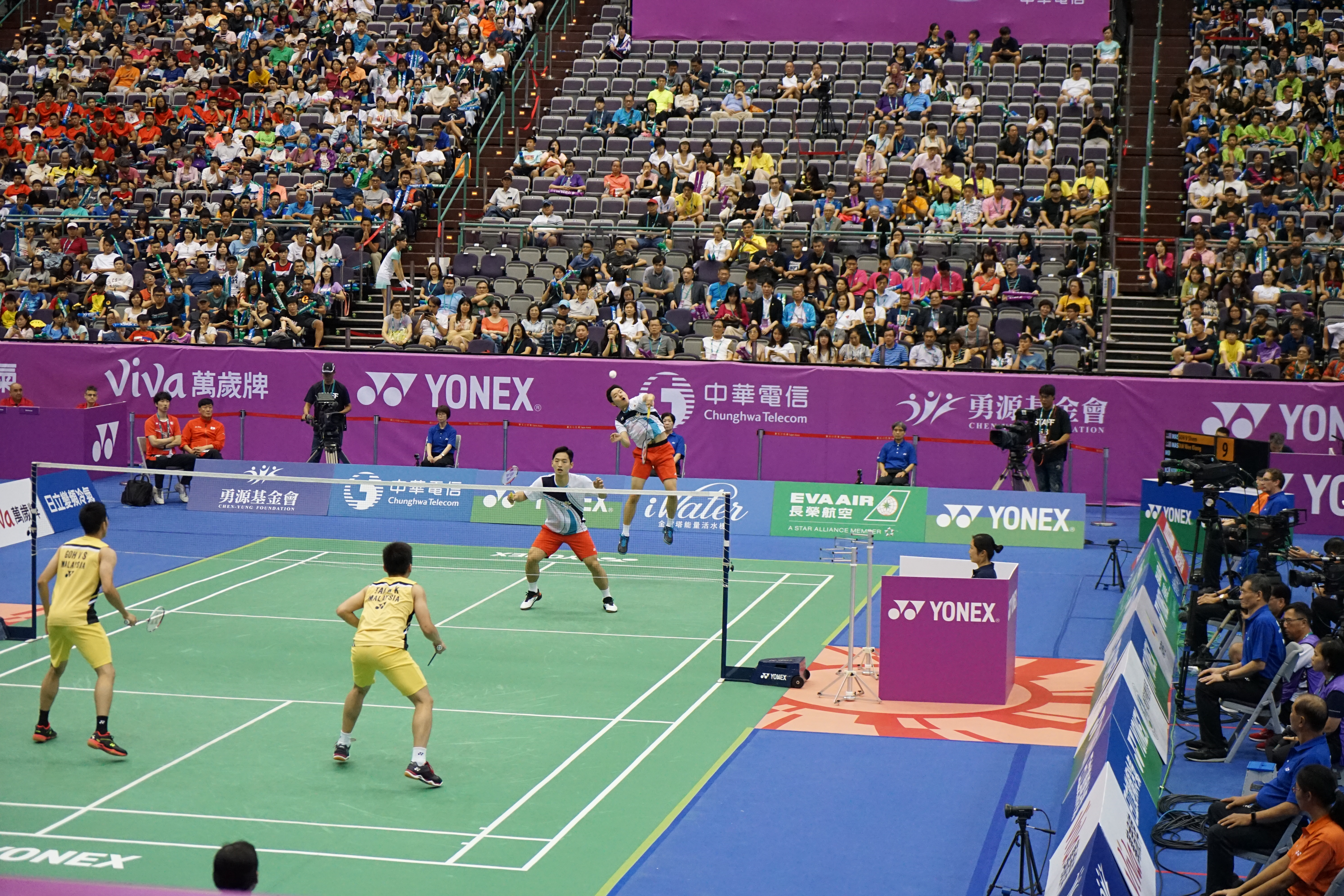
Choi Sol-gyu and Seo Seung-jae against Goh V Shem and Tan Wee Kiong in the final of 2019 Chinese Taipei Open

== Career ==
Choi has been best known as a mixed doubles player since his back-to-back titles at the Asian Junior Championships in 2012 and 2013. However, as a junior, he was also successful in boys' singles, in which he won the under-17 title at the 2011 Surabaya Cup, and the Malaysia International Youth U19 in both 2012 and 2013.

Choi competed at the 2020 Summer Olympics in the men's doubles partnering Seo Seung-jae. His pace at the Games was stopped in the group stage.

== Achievements ==
=== Asian Games ===
Men's doubles
Year	Venue	Partner	Opponent	Score	Result
2022	Binjiang Gymnasium; Hangzhou, China	(South Korea) Kim Won-ho	(India) Satwiksairaj Rankireddy (India) Chirag Shetty	18–21, 16–21	Silver

=== East Asian Games ===
Mixed doubles
Year	Venue	Partner	Opponent	Score	Result
2013	Binhai New Area Dagang Gymnasium; Tianjin, China	(South Korea) Chae Yoo-jung	(China) Xu Chen (China) Ma Jin	10–21, 15–21	Bronze

=== World University Championships ===
Men's doubles
Year	Venue	Partner	Opponent	Score	Result
2016	Sports Palace "Borisoglebskiy"; Ramenskoe, Russia	(South Korea) Kim Jae-hwan	(Chinese Taipei) Lee Jhe-huei (Chinese Taipei) Lee Yang	19–21, 21–14, 21–17	Gold

=== World Junior Championships ===
Mixed doubles
Year	Venue	Partner	Opponent	Score	Result
2011	Taoyuan Arena; Taoyuan City, Taipei, Taiwan	(South Korea) Chae Yoo-jung	(Indonesia) Alfian Eko Prasetya (Indonesia) Gloria Emanuelle Widjaja	18–21, 13–21	Bronze
2013	Hua Mark Indoor Stadium; Bangkok, Thailand	(South Korea) Chae Yoo-jung	(China) Huang Kaixiang (China) Chen Qingchen	13–21, 11–21	Bronze

=== Asian Junior Championships ===
Mixed doubles
Year	Venue	Partner	Opponent	Score	Result
2012	Gimcheon Indoor Stadium; Gimcheon, South Korea	(South Korea) Chae Yoo-jung	(China) Liu Yuchen (China) Huang Dongping	21–11, 19–21, 21–13	Gold
2013	Likas Indoor Stadium; Kota Kinabalu, Malaysia	(South Korea) Chae Yoo-jung	(China) Wang Yilyu (China) Huang Dongping	17–21, 25–23, 23–21	Gold

=== BWF World Tour (4 titles, 5 runners-up) ===
The BWF World Tour, which was announced on 19 March 2017 and implemented in 2018, is a series of elite badminton tournaments sanctioned by the Badminton World Federation (BWF). The BWF World Tour is divided into levels of World Tour Finals, Super 1000, Super 750, Super 500, Super 300, and the BWF Tour Super 100.

Men's doubles
Year	Tournament	Level	Partner	Opponent	Score	Result
2018	Korea Masters	Super 300	(South Korea) Seo Seung-jae	(Chinese Taipei) Po Li-wei (Chinese Taipei) Wang Chi-lin	21–12, 17–21, 21–18	(gold) Winner
2019	Chinese Taipei Open	Super 300	(South Korea) Seo Seung-jae	(Malaysia) Goh V Shem (Malaysia) Tan Wee Kiong	19–21, 21–15, 21–23	(silver) Runner-up
2019	Vietnam Open	Super 100	(South Korea) Seo Seung-jae	(South Korea) Na Sung-seung (South Korea) Wang Chan	18–21, 21–16, 21–14	(gold) Winner
2019	Hong Kong Open	Super 500	(South Korea) Seo Seung-jae	(Indonesia) Mohammad Ahsan (Indonesia) Hendra Setiawan	13–21, 21–12, 21–13	(gold) Winner
2019	Syed Modi International	Super 300	(South Korea) Seo Seung-jae	(China) He Jiting (China) Tan Qiang	18–21, 19–21	(silver) Runner-up
2022	Indonesia Open	Super 1000	(South Korea) Kim Won-ho	(China) Liu Yuchen (China) Ou Xuanyi	17–21, 21–23	(silver) Runner-up
2023	German Open	Super 300	(South Korea) Kim Won-ho	(South Korea) Kang Min-hyuk (South Korea) Seo Seung-jae	21–19, 18–21, 21–19	(gold) Winner
2025 (II)	Indonesia Masters	Super 100	(Malaysia) Goh V Shem	(Indonesia) Raymond Indra (Indonesia) Nikolaus Joaquin	18–21, 21–17, 22–24	(silver) Runner-up

Mixed doubles
Year	Tournament	Level	Partner	Opponent	Score	Result
2018	Korea Masters	Super 300	(South Korea) Shin Seung-chan	(South Korea) Ko Sung-hyun (South Korea) Eom Hye-won	12–21, 21–15, 18–21	(silver) Runner-up

=== BWF Grand Prix (4 titles, 6 runners-up) ===
The BWF Grand Prix had two levels, the Grand Prix and Grand Prix Gold. It was a series of badminton tournaments sanctioned by the Badminton World Federation (BWF) and played between 2007 and 2017.

Mixed doubles
Year	Tournament	Partner	Opponent	Score	Result
2013	Macau Open	(South Korea) Chae Yoo-jung	(China) Lu Kai (China) Huang Yaqiong	21–17, 18–21, 17–21	(silver) Runner-up
2013	Vietnam Open	(South Korea) Chae Yoo-jung	(Chinese Taipei) Liao Min-chun (Chinese Taipei) Chen Hsiao-huan	22–20, 19–21, 21–14	(gold) Winner
2014	Korea Grand Prix	(South Korea) Shin Seung-chan	(South Korea) Shin Baek-cheol (South Korea) Chang Ye-na	Walkover	(gold) Winner
2015	Vietnam Open	(South Korea) Chae Yoo-jung	(China) Huang Kaixiang (China) Huang Dongping	19–21, 12–21	(silver) Runner-up
2015	Thailand Open	(South Korea) Eom Hye-won	(Indonesia) Praveen Jordan (Indonesia) Debby Susanto	21–19, 17–21, 21–16	(gold) Winner
2015	Macau Open	(South Korea) Eom Hye-won	(South Korea) Shin Baek-cheol (South Korea) Chae Yoo-jung	18–21, 13–21	(silver) Runner-up
2015	U.S. Grand Prix	(South Korea) Eom Hye-won	(Germany) Michael Fuchs (Germany) Birgit Michels	21–12, 21–14	(gold) Winner
2015	Mexico City Grand Prix	(South Korea) Eom Hye-won	(Malaysia) Chan Peng Soon (Malaysia) Goh Liu Ying	14–21, 12–21	(silver) Runner-up
2017	Canada Open	(South Korea) Chae Yoo-jung	(South Korea) Kim Won-ho (South Korea) Shin Seung-chan	19–21, 16–21	(silver) Runner-up
2017	Korea Masters	(South Korea) Chae Yoo-jung	(South Korea) Seo Seung-jae (South Korea) Kim Ha-na	21–17, 13–21, 18–21	(silver) Runner-up

BWF Grand Prix Gold tournament
BWF Grand Prix tournament

=== BWF International Challenge/Series (6 titles, 1 runner-up) ===
Men's doubles
Year	Tournament	Partner	Opponent	Score	Result
2018	Norwegian International	(South Korea) Seo Seung-jae	(Denmark) Mads Emil Christensen (Denmark) Kristoffer Knudsen	21–12, 21–13	(gold) Winner
2018	Irish Open	(South Korea) Seo Seung-jae	(Scotland) Jack MacGregor (Scotland) Ciar Pringle	21–17, 21–12	(gold) Winner
2024	Thailand International	(South Korea) Lim Su-min	(Thailand) Thanawin Madee (Thailand) Wachirawit Sothon	17–21, 21–18, 21–15	(gold) Winner
2026	Vietnam International (Bắc Ninh)	(South Korea) Lim Su-min	(Hong Kong) Michaelangelo Njoto (Hong Kong) Jerry Yu	17–21, 21–18, 21–17	(gold) Winner

Mixed doubles
Year	Tournament	Partner	Opponent	Score	Result
2013	Romanian International	(South Korea) Kim Hye-rin	(Turkey) Ramazan Öztürk (Turkey) Neslihan Kılıç	21–16, 21–13	(gold) Winner
2014	Osaka International	(South Korea) Chae Yoo-jung	(Indonesia) Muhammad Rijal (Indonesia) Vita Marissa	18–21, 21–17, 18–21	(silver) Runner-up
2015	Thailand International	(South Korea) Chae Yoo-jung	(Malaysia) Tan Chee Tean (Malaysia) Shevon Jemie Lai	18–21, 21–19, 21–12	(gold) Winner

BWF International Challenge tournament
BWF International Series tournament
