= 2015 Macau Open Grand Prix Gold =

Tournament details
- Dates: November 24, 2015 - November 29, 2015
- Level: Grand Prix Gold
- Total prize money: US$120,000
- Venue: Tap Seac Multi-sports Pavilion
- Location: Macau

Champions
- Men's singles: (South Korea) Jeon Hyeok-jin
- Women's singles: (India) Pusarla Venkata Sindhu
- Men's doubles: (South Korea) Ko Sung-hyun (South Korea) Shin Baek-cheol
- Women's doubles: (South Korea) Jung Kyung-eun (South Korea) Shin Seung-chan
- Mixed doubles: (South Korea) Shin Baek-cheol (South Korea) Chae Yoo-jung

The 2015 Macau Open Grand Prix Open was the nineteenth grand prix gold and grand prix tournament of the 2015 BWF Grand Prix Gold and Grand Prix. The tournament was held in Tap Seac Multi-sports Pavilion, Macau November 24–29, 2015 and had a total budget of $120,000.

== Men's singles ==
=== Seeds ===
1. (India) Srikanth Kidambi (first round)
2. (China) Tian Houwei (final)
3. (Malaysia) Lee Chong Wei (withdrew)
4. (South Korea) Son Wan-ho (third round)
5. (Hong Kong) Hu Yun (first round)
6. (Hong Kong) Wei Nan (second round)
7. (India) H. S. Prannoy (quarterfinals)
8. (China) Xue Song (first round)
9. (India) Ajay Jayaram (second round)
10. (Hong Kong) Ng Ka Long (third round)
11. (Hong Kong) Wong Wing Ki (third round)
12. (Thailand) Tanongsak Saensomboonsuk (first round)
13. (South Korea) Jeon Hyeok-jin (champion)
14. (Malaysia) Chong Wei Feng (second round)
15. (India) B. Sai Praneeth (quarterfinals)
16. (Indonesia) Ihsan Maulana Mustofa (semifinals)

=== Finals ===
Quarterfinals
13	(South Korea) Jeon Hyeok-jin	21	21
(Japan) Kenta Nishimoto	16	13
15	(India) B. Sai Praneeth	16	23	13
(Malaysia) Goh Soon Huat	21	21	21
7	(India) H. S. Prannoy	21	19	11
16	(Indonesia) Ihsan Maulana Mustofa	18	21	21
(South Korea) Seo Seung-jae	9	21	15
2	(China) Tian Houwei	21	19	21

Semifinals
13	(South Korea) Jeon Hyeok-jin	21	21
(Malaysia) Goh Soon Huat	15	15
16	(Indonesia) Ihsan Maulana Mustofa	18	17
2	(China) Tian Houwei	21	21

Final
13	(South Korea) Jeon Hyeok-jin	21	13	23
2	(China) Tian Houwei	11	21	21

=== Top half ===
==== Section 1 ====
First Round
1	(India) K. Srikanth	16	21
(Indonesia) J Christie	21	23
(Chinese Taipei) Kuo P-c
Q5	BYE
13	(South Korea) Jeon H-j	21	21
Q6	(Macau) Lam H H	8	4
(Chinese Taipei) Shih K-c
Q7	BYE

Second Round
(Indonesia) J Christie	11	21	21
(Chinese Taipei) Kuo P-c	21	12	12
13	(South Korea) Jeon H-j	21	21
(Chinese Taipei) Shih K-c	17	7

Third Round
(Indonesia) J Christie	18	19
13	(South Korea) Jeon H-j	21	21

==== Section 2 ====
First Round
8	(China) Xue S	9	22	5
(Japan) K Nishimoto	21	20	21
Q1	BYE
(Indonesia) K B Alexander
11	(Hong Kong) Wong W K	21	17	21
(South Korea) Heo K-h	19	21	18
(Indonesia) A S Ginting	21	15	21
(Chinese Taipei) Yang Y-h	12	21	16

Second Round
(Japan) K Nishimoto	21	21
(Indonesia) K B Alexander	8	12
11	(Hong Kong) Wong W K	14	21	21
(Indonesia) A S Ginting	21	15	16

Third Round
(Japan) K Nishimoto	21	21
11	(Hong Kong) Wong W K	11	19

==== Section 3 ====
First Round
PFQ	(Malaysia) Tan K K	w/o
(Chinese Taipei) Yang C-c
(Malaysia) Ai W J	13	14
(Indonesia) A K Tedjono	21	21
15	(India) B. S Praneeth	21	23
(Indonesia) F I Hadmadi	18	21
(Uzbekistan) A Savatyugin	21	21
Q2	(Macau) Pui P F	14	12

Second Round
(Chinese Taipei) Yang C-c	15	17
(Indonesia) A K Tedjono	21	21
15	(India) B. S Praneeth	21	21
(Uzbekistan) A Savatyugin	11	8

Third Round
(Indonesia) A K Tedjono	15	6
15	(India) B. S Praneeth	21	21

==== Section 4 ====
First Round
5	(Hong Kong) Hu Y	9	8
(South Korea) Kim D-h	21	21
(Indonesia) W K Henrikho	8	12
(Chinese Taipei) Wang T-w	21	21
12	(Thailand) T Saensomboonsuk	19	19
(Malaysia) Goh SH	21	21
(Hong Kong) Lee C Y	21	21
(Scotland) A Casey	11	8

Second Round
(South Korea) Kim D-h	12	13
(Chinese Taipei) Wang T-w	21	21
(Malaysia) Goh SH	21	21
(Hong Kong) Lee C Y	18	15

Third Round
(Chinese Taipei) Wang T-w	20	20
(Malaysia) Goh SH	22	22

=== Bottom half ===
==== Section 5 ====
First Round
(China) Qiao B	21	21
PFQ	(Macau) Iek U I	1	8
Q4	(Macau) Wong C C	14	4
14	(Malaysia) Chong W F	21	21
(Chinese Taipei) Lin C-h	21	21
PFQ	(Macau) Wan W C	12	7
(Indonesia) E Sukamta	15	21	18
7	(India) H. S. Prannoy	21	16	21

Second Round
(China) Qiao B	21	21
14	(Malaysia) Chong W F	16	8
(Chinese Taipei) Lin C-h	19	15
7	(India) H. S. Prannoy	21	21

Third Round
(China) Qiao B	21	11	19
7	(India) H. S. Prannoy	12	21	21

==== Section 6 ====
First Round
(Chinese Taipei) Cheng P-w	21	19
(Malaysia) Woon K H	16	18^{r}
PFQ	(Indonesia) K Akbar	9	12
16	(Indonesia) I M Mustofa	21	21
Q3	(Macau) Che P N	5	5
(Indonesia) F A Kholik	21	21
Q8	BYE
4	(South Korea) Son W-h

Second Round
(Chinese Taipei) Cheng P-w	15	10
16	(Indonesia) I M Mustofa	21	21
(Indonesia) F A Kholik	19	11
4	(South Korea) Son W-h	21	21

Third Round
16	(Indonesia) I M Mustofa	21	26
4	(South Korea) Son W-h	15	24

==== Section 7 ====
First Round
(Hong Kong) Chan Y K	21	21
PFQ	(Chinese Taipei) Yang C-h	17	17
(Japan) K Tago	21	7	13
10	(Hong Kong) Ng K L	17	21	21
(South Korea) Seo S-j	21	8	21
(Indonesia) M B Pangisthu	18	21	17
(Singapore) D Wong	14	22
6	(Hong Kong) Wei N	21	24

Second Round
(Hong Kong) Chan Y K	21	16	12
10	(Hong Kong) Ng K L	16	21	21
(South Korea) Seo S-j	21	21
6	(Hong Kong) Wei N	10	17

Third Round
10	(Hong Kong) Ng K L	20	17
(South Korea) Seo S-j	22	21

==== Section 8 ====
First Round
PFQ	(Hong Kong) Lee C W	6	8
(China) Lin GP	21	21
(Hong Kong) Tam C H	6	23
9	(India) A Jayaram	21	25
(Indonesia) A Marteen	22	20
(Chinese Taipei) Liu W-c	24	22
(Chinese Taipei) Lin Y-h	16	18
2	(China) Tian HW	21	21

Second Round
(China) Lin GP	21	21
9	(India) A Jayaram	11	17
(Chinese Taipei) Liu W-c	9	9
2	(China) Tian HW	21	21

Third Round
(China) Lin GP	16	21	7
2	(China) Tian HW	21	12	21

== Women's singles ==
=== Seeds ===
1. (Thailand) Ratchanok Intanon (withdrew)
2. (Japan) Akane Yamaguchi (semifinals)
3. (China) Sun Yu (first round)
4. (South Korea) Bae Yeon-ju (quarterfinals)
5. (India) Pusarla Venkata Sindhu (champion)
6. (Japan) Minatsu Mitani (final)
7. (Japan) Yui Hashimoto (quarterfinals)
8. (Japan) Sayaka Sato (quarterfinals)

=== Finals ===
Semifinals
(China) He Bingjiao	21	12	12
6	(Japan) Minatsu Mitani	17	21	21
5	(India) P.V. Sindhu	21	15	21
2	(Japan) Akane Yamaguchi	8	21	16

Final
6	(Japan) Minatsu Mitani	9	23	14
5	(India) P.V. Sindhu	21	21	21

=== Top half ===
==== Section 1 ====
First Round
PFQ	(Malaysia) Yang L L	21	21
(United States) I Wang	16	17
(Indonesia) R Hartawan	17	13
(China) He BJ	21	21
7	(Japan) Y Hashimoto	21	21
Q3	(Indonesia) Y Y Susanto	8	8
(Chinese Taipei) Hung S-h	17	21	21
(Indonesia) H Ramadini	21	12	18

Second Round
PFQ	(Malaysia) Yang L L	19	15
(China) He BJ	21	21
7	(Japan) Y Hashimoto	21	21
(Chinese Taipei) Hung S-h	12	19

Quarterfinals
(China) He BJ	23	21
7	(Japan) Y Hashimoto	21	18

==== Section 2 ====
First Round
4	(South Korea) Bae Y-j	17	21	21
(Hong Kong) Yip P Y	21	13	14
Q1	(Hong Kong) Cheung Y M	14	13
(South Korea) Lee J-m	21	21
6	(Japan) M Mitani	21	21
PFQ	(Chinese Taipei) Sung S-y	18	11
Q2	(Chinese Taipei) Yu C-h	21	12	21
(Singapore) Chen JY	14	21	14

Second Round
4	(South Korea) Bae Y-j	21	21
(South Korea) Lee J-m	15	11
6	(Japan) M Mitani	21	21
Q2	(Chinese Taipei) Yu C-h	15	14

Quarterfinals
4	(South Korea) Bae Y-j	22	14	17
6	(Japan) M Mitani	20	21	21

=== Bottom half ===
==== Section 3 ====
First Round
(Chinese Taipei) Cheng C-y	11	9
(Indonesia) L Fanetri	21	21
(South Korea) Kim H-m	13	20
5	(India) P.V. Sindhu	21	22
(China) Chen YF	21	21
(Indonesia) A Firdasari	10	6
(Japan) A Ohori	21	21
3	(China) Sun Yu	16	18

Second Round
(Indonesia) L Fanetri	17	18
5	(India) P.V. Sindhu	21	21
(China) Chen YF	21	21
(Japan) A Ohori	19	9

Quarterfinals
5	(India) P.V. Sindhu	21	18	21
(China) Chen YF	13	21	14

==== Section 4 ====
First Round
(Hong Kong) Cheung N Y	22	21	21
(Indonesia) Fitriani	24	14	14
(Singapore) Liang XY	14	15
8	(Japan) S Sato	21	21
(United States) Zhang BW	21	21
WC	(Macau) Ng W C	7	7
Q4	(Chinese Taipei) Chiang M-h	19	15
2	(Japan) A Yamaguchi	21	21

Second Round
(Hong Kong) Cheung N Y	18	6
8	(Japan) S Sato	21	21
(United States) Zhang BW	14	21	17
2	(Japan) A Yamaguchi	21	19	21

Quarterfinals
8	(Japan) S Sato	13	21	21
2	(Japan) A Yamaguchi	21	13	23

== Men's doubles ==
=== Seeds ===
1. (China) Liu Xiaolong / Qiu Zihan (first round)
2. (South Korea) Ko Sung-hyun / Shin Baek-cheol (champion)
3. (South Korea) Kim Gi-jung / Kim Sa-rang (quarterfinals)
4. (Russia) Vladimir Ivanov / Ivan Sozonov (semifinals)
5. (China) Li Junhui / Liu Yuchen (quarterfinals)
6. (Indonesia) Wahyu Nayaka / Ade Yusuf (first round)
7. (Indonesia) Markus Fernaldi Gideon / Kevin Sanjaya Sukamuljo (second round)
8. (Chinese Taipei) Chen Hung-ling / Wang Chi-lin (semifinals)

=== Finals ===
Semifinals
8	(Chinese Taipei) Chen Hung-ling (Chinese Taipei) Wang Chi-lin	16	18
(Indonesia) Berry Angriawan (Indonesia) Rian Agung Saputro	21	21
4	(Russia) Vladimir Ivanov (Russia) Ivan Sozonov	21	19	20
2	(South Korea) Ko Sung-hyun (South Korea) Shin Baek-cheol	19	21	22

Final
(Indonesia) Berry Angriawan (Indonesia) Rian Agung Saputro	20	14
2	(South Korea) Ko Sung-hyun (South Korea) Shin Baek-cheol	22	21

=== Top half ===
==== Section 1 ====
First Round
1	(China) Liu XL (China) Qiu ZH	19	14
Q4	(Malaysia) Low J S (Malaysia) Tan K M	21	21
(Philippines) P G Magnaye (Philippines) P J Vivas	w/o
(Indonesia) H A Gunawan (Indonesia) M Kido
8	(Chinese Taipei) Chen H-l (Chinese Taipei) Wang C-l	21	21
(Hong Kong) Or C C (Hong Kong) Tang C M	16	16
(Chinese Taipei) Lee J-h (Chinese Taipei) Lee Y	21	21
PFQ	(Netherlands) R Bosch (New Zealand) O Leydon-Davis	15	11

Second Round
Q4	(Malaysia) Low J S (Malaysia) Tan K M	22	21	17
(Indonesia) H A Gunawan (Indonesia) M Kido	24	18	21
8	(Chinese Taipei) Chen H-l (Chinese Taipei) Wang C-l	21	21
(Chinese Taipei) Lee J-h (Chinese Taipei) Lee Y	17	11

Quarterfinals
(Indonesia) H A Gunawan (Indonesia) M Kido	12	17^{r}
8	(Chinese Taipei) Chen H-l (Chinese Taipei) Wang C-l	21	16

==== Section 2 ====
First Round
3	(South Korea) Kim G-j (South Korea) Kim S-r	21	21
(Chinese Taipei) Chang K-c (Chinese Taipei) Liang J-w	13	17
Q2	(Chinese Taipei) Hung Y-y (Chinese Taipei) Lin S-k	19	21	18
(Chinese Taipei) Lin Y-h (Chinese Taipei) Yang Y-h	21	15	21
7	(Indonesia) M F Gideon (Indonesia) K S Sukamuljo	21	21
(Hong Kong) Chan T K (Hong Kong) Law C H	18	16
(Indonesia) B Angriawan (Indonesia) R A Saputro	18	21	21
PFQ	(Malaysia) Lee Y S (Malaysia) Lin W F	21	13	14

Second Round
3	(South Korea) Kim G-j (South Korea) Kim S-r	21	21
(Chinese Taipei) Lin Y-h (Chinese Taipei) Yang Y-h	15	13
7	(Indonesia) M F Gideon (Indonesia) K S Sukamuljo	11	21	11
(Indonesia) B Angriawan (Indonesia) R A Saputro	21	18	21

Quarterfinals
3	(South Korea) Kim G-j (South Korea) Kim S-r	24	13	17
(Indonesia) B Angriawan (Indonesia) R A Saputro	22	21	21

=== Bottom half ===
==== Section 3 ====
First Round
(Hong Kong) Chan Y L (Hong Kong) Lee C H
(Indonesia) H K Clinton (Indonesia) A P R Putra	w/o
(Malaysia) Ong Y S (Malaysia) Teo E Y	21	19	21
6	(Indonesia) W Nayaka (Indonesia) A Yusuf	16	21	10
(Malaysia) Hoon T H (Malaysia) Lim K W
(Philippines) P J Escueta (Philippines) R Estanislao	w/o
(Chinese Taipei) Liu W-c (Chinese Taipei) Yang P-h	18	13
4	(Russia) V Ivanov (Russia) I Sozonov	21	21

Second Round
(Hong Kong) Chan Y L (Hong Kong) Lee C H	21	21
(Malaysia) Ong Y S (Malaysia) Teo E Y	19	18
(Malaysia) Hoon T H (Malaysia) Lim K W	21	21	6
4	(Russia) V Ivanov (Russia) I Sozonov	23	19	21

Quarterfinals
(Hong Kong) Chan Y L (Hong Kong) Lee C H	18	11
4	(Russia) V Ivanov (Russia) I Sozonov	21	21

==== Section 4 ====
First Round
(Malaysia) Chooi K M (Malaysia) Ow Y H	21	21
PFQ	(Chinese Taipei) Su C-h (Chinese Taipei) Yang P-h	12	11
Q3	(Chinese Taipei) Huang P-j (Chinese Taipei) Tien T-c	12	22	9
5	(China) Li JH (China) Liu YC	21	20	21
Q1	(Chinese Taipei) Liao K-h (Chinese Taipei) Lu C-p	21	21
(South Korea) Choi S-g (South Korea) Kim J-h	19	13
(Chinese Taipei) Lin C-y (Chinese Taipei) Wu H-l	21	21	14
2	(South Korea) Ko S-h (South Korea) Shin B-c	23	13	21

Second Round
(Malaysia) Chooi K M (Malaysia) Ow Y H	12	21	12
5	(China) Li JH (China) Liu YC	21	17	21
Q1	(Chinese Taipei) Liao K-h (Chinese Taipei) Lu C-p	13	22
2	(South Korea) Ko S-h (South Korea) Shin B-c	21	24

Quarterfinals
5	(China) Li JH (China) Liu YC	17	21	13
2	(South Korea) Ko S-h (South Korea) Shin B-c	21	16	21

== Women's doubles ==
=== Seeds ===
1. (Japan) Reika Kakiiwa / Miyuki Maeda (withdrew)
2. (India) Jwala Gutta / Ashwini Ponnappa (first round)
3. (Japan) Naoko Fukuman / Kurumi Yonao (second round)
4. (Japan) Shizuka Matsuo / Mami Naito (semifinals)
5. (South Korea) Chang Ye-na / Lee So-hee (quarterfinals)
6. (South Korea) Jung Kyung-eun / Shin Seung-chan (champion)
7. (South Korea) Go Ah-ra / Yoo Hae-won (quarterfinals)
8. (South Korea) Chae Yoo-jung / Kim So-yeong (quarterfinals)

=== Finals ===
Semifinals
6	(South Korea) Jung Kyung-eun (South Korea) Shin Seung-chan	21	21
4	(Japan) Shizuka Matsuo (Japan) Mami Naito	9	9
(Hong Kong) Poon Lok Yan (Hong Kong) Tse Ying Suet	10	21	21
(Japan) Yuki Fukushima (Japan) Sayaka Hirota	21	13	16

Final
6	(South Korea) Jung Kyung-eun (South Korea) Shin Seung-chan	18	15
(Hong Kong) Poon Lok Yan (Hong Kong) Tse Ying Suet	21	15^{r}

=== Top half ===
==== Section 1 ====
First Round
PFQ	(Chinese Taipei) Sung S-y (Chinese Taipei) Yu C-h	12	5
(South Korea) Kim H-r (South Korea) Kong H-y	21	21
(Indonesia) D D Haris (Indonesia) R E Putri Sari	21	21
Q1	(Hong Kong) Ng T Z (Hong Kong) Yeung N T	11	17
6	(South Korea) Jung K-e (South Korea) Shin S-c	21	21
Q4	(Macau) Ieong P S (Macau) U T I	3	3
(China) Du Y (China) Li YH	19	21	14
(Malaysia) Chow M K (Malaysia) Lai P J	21	16	21

Second Round
(South Korea) Kim H-r (South Korea) Kong H-y	21	12	20
(Indonesia) D D Haris (Indonesia) R E Putri Sari	16	21	22
6	(South Korea) Jung K-e (South Korea) Shin S-c	21	21
(Malaysia) Chow M K (Malaysia) Lai P J	14	5

Quarterfinals
(Indonesia) D D Haris (Indonesia) R E Putri Sari	15	17
6	(South Korea) Jung K-e (South Korea) Shin S-c	21	21

==== Section 2 ====
First Round
4	(Japan) S Matsuo (Japan) M Naito	21	21
(Indonesia) R P Dili (Indonesia) R A Pradipta	9	9
(Indonesia) S R Andini (Indonesia) M D Giovani	21	16	21
(Hong Kong) Chan T K (Hong Kong) Yuen S Y	17	21	9
7	(South Korea) Go A-r (South Korea) Yoo H-w	21	21
(Hong Kong) Chan H Y (Hong Kong) Ng W Y	7	13
(Chinese Taipei) Hsieh P-c (Chinese Taipei) Wu T-j	23	21
(Hong Kong) Cheung Y M (Hong Kong) Tsang W C	21	4

Second Round
4	(Japan) S Matsuo (Japan) M Naito	21	21
(Indonesia) S R Andini (Indonesia) M D Giovani	16	17
7	(South Korea) Go A-r (South Korea) Yoo H-w	21	21	23
(Chinese Taipei) Hsieh P-c (Chinese Taipei) Wu T-j	23	12	21

Quarterfinals
4	(Japan) S Matsuo (Japan) M Naito	21	18	21
7	(South Korea) Go A-r (South Korea) Yoo H-w	15	21	7

=== Bottom half ===
==== Section 3 ====
First Round
(Chinese Taipei) Lin T-y (Chinese Taipei) Kuo Y-w	21	25
Q3	(Hong Kong) Fan K Y (Hong Kong) Wu Y T	14	23
(Chinese Taipei) Chiang K-h (Chinese Taipei) Wu F-c	17	15
8	(South Korea) Chae Y-j (South Korea) Kim S-y	21	21
PFQ	(Macau) Gong X X (Macau) Kuan C L	13	8
(Hong Kong) Poon L Y (Hong Kong) Tse Y S	21	21
(Chinese Taipei) Chen S-ying (Chinese Taipei) Chen S-yu	10	9
3	(Japan) N Fukuman (Japan) K Yonao	21	21

Second Round
(Chinese Taipei) Lin T-y (Chinese Taipei) Kuo Y-w	13	15
8	(South Korea) Chae Y-j (South Korea) Kim S-y	21	21
(Hong Kong) Poon L Y (Hong Kong) Tse Y S	21	21
3	(Japan) N Fukuman (Japan) K Yonao	19	17

Quarterfinals
8	(South Korea) Chae Y-j (South Korea) Kim S-y	19	21	9
(Hong Kong) Poon L Y (Hong Kong) Tse Y S	21	7	21

==== Section 4 ====
First Round
(Chinese Taipei) Cheng C-y (Chinese Taipei) Cheng Y-c	16	21	18
(Indonesia) G R Imawan (Indonesia) T R Nuraidah	21	12	21
Q3	(Chinese Taipei) Chang Y-h (Chinese Taipei) Wang P-r	6	14
5	(South Korea) Chang Y-n (South Korea) Lee S-h	21	21
(Indonesia) A S Awanda (Indonesia) N K Mahadewi Istirani	21	21
(Chinese Taipei) Chang H-t (Chinese Taipei) Hu L-f	15	16
(Japan) Y Fukushima (Japan) S Hirota	21	21
2	(India) J Gutta (India) A Ponnappa	16	15

Second Round
(Indonesia) G R Imawan (Indonesia) T R Nuraidah	16	12
5	(South Korea) Chang Y-n (South Korea) Lee S-h	21	21
(Indonesia) A S Awanda (Indonesia) N K Mahadewi Istirani	16	21	10
(Japan) Y Fukushima (Japan) S Hirota	21	19	21

Quarterfinals
5	(South Korea) Chang Y-n (South Korea) Lee S-h	21	18	19
(Japan) Y Fukushima (Japan) S Hirota	17	21	21

== Mixed doubles ==
=== Seeds ===
1. (South Korea) Ko Sung-hyun / Kim Ha-na (withdrew)
2. (England) Chris Adcock / Gabrielle Adcock (withdrew)
3. (Hong Kong) Lee Chun Hei / Chau Hoi Wah (quarterfinals)
4. (Indonesia) Edi Subaktiar / Gloria Emanuelle Widjaja (quarterfinals)
5. (South Korea) Shin Baek-cheol / Chae Yoo-jung (champion)
6. (Hong Kong) Chan Yun Lung / Tse Ying Suet (quarterfinals)
7. (Indonesia) Ronald Alexander / Melati Daeva Oktaviani (semifinals)
8. (Indonesia) Markis Kido / Pia Zebadiah Bernadeth (first round)

=== Finals ===
Semifinals
7	(Indonesia) Ronald Alexander (Indonesia) Melati Daeva Oktaviani	19	19
(South Korea) Choi Sol-gyu (South Korea) Eom Hye-won	21	21
5	(South Korea) Shin Baek-cheol (South Korea) Chae Yoo-jung	21	21
PFQ	(China) Liu Yuchen (China) Li Yinhui	18	18

Final
(South Korea) Choi Sol-gyu (South Korea) Eom Hye-won	18	13
5	(South Korea) Shin Baek-cheol (South Korea) Chae Yoo-jung	21	21

=== Top half ===
==== Section 1 ====
First Round
PFQ	(Chinese Taipei) Lu C-h (Chinese Taipei) Chiang K-h	17	21	13
(Malaysia) Tan C T (Malaysia) Chow M K	21	15	21
Q3	(Chinese Taipei) Lee J-h (Chinese Taipei) Wang P-r	19	21	21
(Chinese Taipei) Lee C-h (Chinese Taipei) Cheng C-y	21	15	15
7	(Indonesia) R Alexander (Indonesia) M D Oktaviani	20	21	21
(Chinese Taipei) Wang C-l (Chinese Taipei) Yu C-h	22	14	14
(Chinese Taipei) Yang P-h (Chinese Taipei) Chen S-y	15	19
(Hong Kong) Or C C (Hong Kong) Chan T K	21	21

Second Round
(Malaysia) Tan C T (Malaysia) Chow M K	19	21	14
Q3	(Chinese Taipei) Lee J-h (Chinese Taipei) Wang P-r	21	17	21
7	(Indonesia) R Alexander (Indonesia) M D Oktaviani	21	21
(Hong Kong) Or C C (Hong Kong) Chan T K	14	8

Quarterfinals
Q3	(Chinese Taipei) Lee J-h (Chinese Taipei) Wang P-r	13	16
7	(Indonesia) R Alexander (Indonesia) M D Oktaviani	21	21

==== Section 2 ====
First Round
3	(Hong Kong) Lee C H (Hong Kong) Chau H W	21	23
(Indonesia) A E Prasetya (Indonesia) A Saufika	13	21
(Chinese Taipei) Lin C-y (Chinese Taipei) Wu T-j	13	19
(South Korea) Kim G-j (South Korea) Shin S-c	21	21
8	(Indonesia) M Kido (Indonesia) P Z Bernadeth	19	14
(South Korea) Choi S-g (South Korea) Eom H-w	21	21
(Chinese Taipei) Su C-h (Chinese Taipei) Wu F-c	21'	7	15
(South Korea) Kim J-h (South Korea) Kim H-r	17	21	21

Second Round
3	(Hong Kong) Lee C H (Hong Kong) Chau H W	21	21
(South Korea) Kim G-j (South Korea) Shin S-c	16	18
(South Korea) Choi S-g (South Korea) Eom H-w	21	21
(South Korea) Kim J-h (South Korea) Kim H-r	19	14

Quarterfinals
3	(Hong Kong) Lee C H (Hong Kong) Chau H W	21	18	15
(South Korea) Choi S-g (South Korea) Eom H-w	13	21	21

=== Bottom half ===
==== Section 3 ====
First Round
(Chinese Taipei) Wu Y-c (Chinese Taipei) Sung S-y	9	9
Q4	(Hong Kong) Li K H (Hong Kong) Yeung N T	21	21
(Chinese Taipei) Liu W-c (Chinese Taipei) Hung S-h	14	13
5	(South Korea) Shin B-c (South Korea) Chae Y-j	21	21
(Chinese Taipei) Wu H-l (Chinese Taipei) Hsieh P-c	19	21	21
Q1	(Chinese Taipei) Yang P-h (Chinese Taipei) Chen S-y	21	18	12
(Malaysia) Tan K M (Malaysia) Lai P J	21	24	10
4	(Indonesia) E Subaktiar (Indonesia) G E Widjaja	23	22	21

Second Round
Q4	(Hong Kong) Li K H (Hong Kong) Yeung N T	8	6
5	(South Korea) Shin B-c (South Korea) Chae Y-j	21	21
(Chinese Taipei) Wu H-l (Chinese Taipei) Hsieh P-c	7	14
4	(Indonesia) E Subaktiar (Indonesia) G E Widjaja	21	21

Quarterfinals
5	(South Korea) Shin B-c (South Korea) Chae Y-j	21	21
4	(Indonesia) E Subaktiar (Indonesia) G E Widjaja	13	13

==== Section 4 ====
First Round
(Chinese Taipei) Chen H-l (Chinese Taipei) Hu L-f	13	18
(China) Li JH (China) Du Y	21	21
Q2	(Hong Kong) Chung Y (Hong Kong) Ng T Y	18	10
6	(Hong Kong) Chan Y L (Hong Kong) Tse S Y	21	21
(Chinese Taipei) Chang K-c (Chinese Taipei) Chang H-t	21	14	15
(Hong Kong) Tang C M (Hong Kong) Poon L Y	14	21	21
(Indonesia) I Fadhilah (Indonesia) W Anggraini	9	15
PFQ	(China) Liu YC (China) Li YH	21	21

Second Round
(China) Li JH (China) Du Y	17	14
6	(Hong Kong) Chan Y L (Hong Kong) Tse S Y	21	21
(Hong Kong) Tang C M (Hong Kong) Poon L Y	14	5
PFQ	(China) Liu YC (China) Li YH	21	21

Quarterfinals
6	(Hong Kong) Chan Y L (Hong Kong) Tse S Y	19	21	18
PFQ	(China) Liu YC (China) Li YH	21	19	21

Preceded by 2015 Scottish Open Grand Prix	BWF Grand Prix Gold and Grand Prix; 2015 season	Succeeded by 2015 Indonesian Masters Grand Prix Gold
