= 2013 Bitburger Open Grand Prix Gold =

Tournament details
- Dates: 29 October - 3 November
- Total prize money: US$120,000
- Venue: Saarlandhalle
- Location: Saarbrücken, Germany

The 2013 Bitburger Open Grand Prix Gold was the fourteenth Grand Prix Gold and Grand Prix tournament of the 2013 BWF Grand Prix Gold and Grand Prix. The tournament was held in Saarlandhalle, Saarbrücken, Germany October 29 until November 3, 2013 and had a total purse of $120,000.

== Men's singles ==
=== Seeds ===
1. (Germany) Marc Zwiebler (final)
2. (Denmark) Hans-Kristian Vittinghus (first round)
3. (England) Rajiv Ouseph (third round)
4. (Chinese Taipei) Chou Tien-chen (champion)
5. (India) Anand Pawar (third round)
6. (Malaysia) Tan Chun Seang (second round)
7. (Finland) Ville Lang (quarter-final)
8. (India) Sai Praneeth (withdrew)
9. (Thailand) Suppanyu Avihingsanon (semi-final)
10. (Sweden) Henri Hurskainen (third round)
11. (France) Brice Leverdez (withdrew)
12. (Republic of Ireland) Scott Evans (quarter-final)
13. (Ukraine) Dmytro Zavadsky (quarter-final)
14. (Germany) Dieter Domke (third round)
15. (Israel) Misha Zilberman (third round)
16. (Russia) Vladimir Malkov (first round)

=== Finals ===
Quarterfinals
1	(Germany) Marc Zwiebler	21	21
(Denmark) Emil Holst	15	17
13	(Ukraine) Dmytro Zavadsky	21	20	14
9	(Thailand) Suppanyu Avihingsanon	15	22	21
7	(Finland) Ville Lang	15	3^{r}
4	(Chinese Taipei) Chou Tien-chen	21	6
12	(Republic of Ireland) Scott Evans	17	13
(Malaysia) Chan Kwong Beng	21	21

Semifinals
1	(Germany) Marc Zwiebler	14	21	21
9	(Thailand) Suppanyu Avihingsanon	21	16	14
4	(Chinese Taipei) Chou Tien-chen	21	21
(Malaysia) Chan Kwong Beng	17	11

Final
1	(Germany) Marc Zwiebler	21	18	15
4	(Chinese Taipei) Chou Tien-chen	13	21	21

=== Top half ===
==== Section 1 ====
First Round
1	(Germany) M Zwiebler	21	21
(Denmark) C Thomsen	11	16
(Switzerland) A Dumartheray	16	10
(Scotland) K Merrilees	21	21
PFQ	(Germany) P Discher	15	14
(Sweden) G Ulldahl	21	21
(Malaysia) Loke KP	21	21
Q7	(Republic of Ireland) J Dolan	12	16

Second Round
1	(Germany) M Zwiebler	21	21
(Scotland) K Merrilees	16	13
(Sweden) G Ulldahl	21	21
(Malaysia) Loke KP	12	19

Third Round
1	(Germany) M Zwiebler	21	21
(Sweden) G Ulldahl	14	14

==== Section 2 ====
First Round
6	(Malaysia) Tan CS	21	21
Q5	(Germany) A Roovers	16	14
Q8	(Germany) S Rduch	18	17
(Denmark) E Holst	21	21
15	(Israel) M Zilberman	21	21
(Russia) A Ivanov	14	16
(Indonesia) Siswanto	21	6	13
(Germany) M Reuter	17	21	21

Second Round
6	(Malaysia) Tan CS	16	26	13
(Denmark) E Holst	21	24	21
15	(Israel) M Zilberman	21	21
(Germany) M Reuter	14	17

Third Round
(Denmark) E Holst
15	(Israel) M Zilberman	wo

==== Section 3 ====
First Round
3	(England) R Ouseph	21	21
(India) A Bhat	12	17
(Denmark) K Bruun	16	21	16
(Netherlands) N Fransman	21	12	21
13	(Ukraine) D Zavadsky	23	21
(Russia) A Yartsev	21	11
(Austria) M Almer	12	8
(Germany) R Domke	21	21

Second Round
3	(England) R Ouseph	18	21	21
(Netherlands) N Fransman	21	11	19
13	(Ukraine) D Zavadsky	21	21	21
(Germany) R Domke	23	14	19

Third Round
3	(England) R Ouseph	17	19
13	(Ukraine) D Zavadsky	21	21

==== Section 4 ====
First Round
PFQ	(Austria) R Gnedt	20	18
(Denmark) J Persson	22	21
(Germany) A Trisnanto	13	21	21
(Czech Republic) P Koukal	21	15	23
9	(Thailand) S Avihingsanon	21	21
(Czech Republic) P Florian	19	7
(Belgium) M Moreels	15	15
(Finland) E Heino	21	21

Second Round
(Denmark) J Persson	21	21
(Czech Republic) P Koukal	16	18
9	(Thailand) S Avihingsanon	21	21
(Finland) E Heino	15	18

Third Round
(Denmark) J Persson	13	21	18
9	(Thailand) S Avihingsanon	21	18	21

=== Bottom half ===
==== Section 5 ====
First Round
(Germany) S Schoettler	22	13
(Malaysia) B Wong	24	21
(Denmark) F Quach	21	12	21
16	(Russia) V Malkov	17	21	15
Q1	(Germany) S Kastens	13	20
(Germany) L Schmidt	21	2
(Austria) W Gnedt	12	18
7	(Finland) V Lang	21	21

Second Round
(Malaysia) B Wong	19	18
(Denmark) F Quach	21	21
(Germany) L Schmidt	21	19	13
7	(Finland) V Lang	13	21	21

Third Round
(Denmark) F Quach	21	19	7
7	(Finland) V Lang	12	21	21

==== Section 6 ====
First Round
(Indonesia) A Marteen	20	21	21
Q3	(Bulgaria) S Makarski	22	13	13
(England) M Spencer-Smith	10	11
10	(Sweden) H Hurskainen	21	21
Q4	(Malaysia) Woon KH	21	21
(Czech Republic) J Frohlich	14	13
(Poland) M Rogalski	15	16
4	(Chinese Taipei) Chou T-c	21	21

Second Round
(Indonesia) A Marteen	11	11
10	(Sweden) H Hurskainen	21	21
Q4	(Malaysia) Woon KH	13	15
4	(Chinese Taipei) Chou T-c	21	21

Third Round
10	(Sweden) H Hurskainen	14	15
4	(Chinese Taipei) Chou T-c	21	21

==== Section 7 ====
First Round
(Bulgaria) B Kisyov	17	21	21
(New Zealand) M Fowke	21	5	17
(Malaysia) Chiang JS	21	15
12	(Republic of Ireland) S Evans	23	21
(Netherlands) E Meijs	21	21
(France) L Claerbout	13	19
(Ukraine) K Leonov	12	13
5	(India) A Pawar	21	21

Second Round
(Bulgaria) B Kisyov	10	19
12	(Republic of Ireland) S Evans	21	21
(Netherlands) E Meijs	12	14
5	(India) A Pawar	21	21

Third Round
12	(Republic of Ireland) S Evans	16	21	21
5	(India) A Pawar	21	17	6

==== Section 8 ====
First Round
(Ukraine) V Konov	19	19
(Germany) K Schaefer	21	21
Q6	(Germany) M Heumann	7	5
14	(Germany) D Domke	21	21
(Austria) L Wraber	22	21
Q2	(Germany) T Wadenka	20	19
(Malaysia) Chan KB	25	21
2	(Denmark) H Vittinghus	23	12

Second Round
(Germany) K Schaefer	10	21	14
14	(Germany) D Domke	21	15	21
(Austria) L Wraber	17	10
(Malaysia) Chan KB	21	21

Third Round
14	(Germany) D Domke	21	14
(Malaysia) Chan KB	23	21

== Women's singles ==
=== Seeds ===
1. (Thailand) Nichaon Jindapon (champion)
2. (Spain) Carolina Marín (withdrew)
3. (Scotland) Kirsty Gilmour (semi-final)
4. (Spain) Beatriz Corrales (quarter-final)
5. (Bulgaria) Linda Zechiri (final)
6. (France) Sashina Vignes Waran (quarter-final)
7. (Germany) Karin Schnaase (second round)
8. (Republic of Ireland) Chloe Magee (quarter-final)

=== Finals ===
Semifinals
1	(Thailand) Nichaon Jindapon	21	21
(Russia) Natalia Perminova	18	18
3	(Scotland) Kirsty Gilmour	11	18
5	(Bulgaria) Linda Zechiri	21	21

Final
1	(Thailand) Nichaon Jindapon	21	21
5	(Bulgaria) Linda Zechiri	13	13

=== Top half ===
==== Section 1 ====
First Round
1	(Thailand) N Jindapon	21	21
(Ukraine) N Voytsekh	13	6
Q3	(Russia) A Chervaykova	17	19
(Belgium) L Tan	21	21
8	(Republic of Ireland) C Magee	22	21
(Chinese Taipei) Chang Y-l	20	14
(France) P Le Buhanic	21	18	15
Q4	(Finland) N Vainio	17	21	21

Second Round
1	(Thailand) N Jindapon
(Belgium) L Tan	wo
8	(Republic of Ireland) C Magee	21	21
Q4	(Finland) N Vainio	13	12

Quarterfinals
1	(Thailand) N Jindapon	21	21
8	(Republic of Ireland) C Magee	17	17

==== Section 2 ====
First Round
4	(Spain) B Corrales	22	11	21
(England) S Walker	20	21	18
Q2	(Czech Republic) K Tomalova	16	13
PFQ	(Sweden) M Petersen	21	21
7	(Germany) K Schnaase	21	21
(Indonesia) M Wiranto	9	16
(Russia) N Perminova	21	21
(Estonia) G Saar	11	6

Second Round
4	(Spain) B Corrales	21	21
PFQ	(Sweden) M Petersen	11	13
7	(Germany) K Schnaase	20	21	10
(Russia) N Perminova	22	11	21

Quarterfinals
4	(Spain) B Corrales	22	17	19
(Russia) N Perminova	20	21	21

=== Bottom half ===
==== Section 3 ====
First Round
(Ukraine) M Ulitina	13	21	10
(England) F Chapman	21	11	21
(India) P Thulasi	21	14	14
6	(France) S Vignes Waran	18	21	21
Q1	(Ukraine) Y Zharka	12	16
(Denmark) L Kjaersfeldt	21	21
(Austria) S Prutsch	19	15
3	(Scotland) K Gilmour	21	21

Second Round
(England) F Chapman	18	13
6	(France) S Vignes Waran	21	21
(Denmark) L Kjaersfeldt	18	11
3	(Scotland) K Gilmour	21	21

Quarterfinals
6	(France) S Vignes Waran	17	18
3	(Scotland) K Gilmour	21	21

==== Section 4 ====
First Round
PFQ	(Czech Republic) L Cerna	14	21	11
(Russia) K Polikarpova	21	19	21
(Czech Republic) Z Pavelkova	10	13
5	(Bulgaria) L Zechiri	21	21
(Wales) C Turner	9	9
(New Zealand) M Chan Ky	21	21
(Switzerland) S Jaquet	21	21
PFQ	(Belgium) M Demy	15	19

Second Round
(Russia) K Polikarpova	16	15
5	(Bulgaria) L Zechiri	21	21
(New Zealand) M Chan Ky	19	21	15
(Switzerland) S Jaquet	21	19	21

Quarterfinals
5	(Bulgaria) L Zechiri	21	21
(Switzerland) S Jaquet	15	18

== Men's doubles ==
=== Seeds ===
1. (Thailand) Maneepong Jongjit / Nipitphon Puangpuapech (second round)
2. (England) Chris Adcock / Andrew Ellis (second round)
3. (England) Chris Langridge / Peter Mills (quarter-final)
4. (Poland) Adam Cwalina / Przemyslaw Wacha (first round)
5. (England) Marcus Ellis / (Scotland) Paul Van Rietvelde (withdrew)
6. (Thailand) Wannawat Ampunsuwan / Patiphat Chalardchaleam (quarter-final)
7. (Germany) Michael Fuchs / Johannes Schoettler (quarter-final)
8. (Netherlands) Jacco Arends / Jelle Maas (semi-final)

=== Finals ===
Semifinals
(Denmark) Mads Conrad-Petersen (Denmark) Mads Pieler Kolding	21	21
8	(Netherlands) Jacco Arends (Netherlands) Jelle Maas	13	11
(France) Baptiste Careme (France) Ronan Labar	6	16
(Denmark) Anders Skaarup Rasmussen (Denmark) Kim Astrup Sorensen	21	21

Final
(Denmark) Mads Conrad-Petersen (Denmark) Mads Pieler Kolding	21	21
(Denmark) Anders Skaarup Rasmussen (Denmark) Kim Astrup Sorensen	11	16

=== Top half ===
==== Section 1 ====
First Round
1	(Thailand) M Jongjit (Thailand) N Puangpuapech	21	16	21
(Republic of Ireland) S Magee (Republic of Ireland) J Dolan	14	21	16
(Denmark) M Conrad-Petersen (Denmark) M Kolding	21	21
(Russia) A Ashmarin (Russia) V Durkin	15	10
7	(Germany) M Fuchs (Germany) J Schoettler	21	21
PFQ	(Switzerland) A Dumartheray (Switzerland) T Heiniger	19	13
(Germany) J Jansen (Germany) A Trisnanto	21	21
Q4	(Luxembourg) E Solagna (Luxembourg) M Vallenthini	14	11

Second Round
1	(Thailand) M Jongjit (Thailand) N Puangpuapech	17	22	11
(Denmark) M Conrad-Petersen (Denmark) M Kolding	21	20	21
7	(Germany) M Fuchs (Germany) J Schoettler	21	21
(Germany) J Jansen (Germany) A Trisnanto	15	14

Quarterfinals
(Denmark) M Conrad-Petersen (Denmark) M Kolding	19	21	21
7	(Germany) M Fuchs (Germany) J Schoettler	21	15	19

==== Section 2 ====
First Round
3	(England) C Langridge (England) P Mills	21	21
(Germany) L Bednorsch (Germany) P Beier	17	12
(Switzerland) F Schmid (Switzerland) G Tripet	20	21	21
(Germany) M Heumann (Germany) T Wadenka	22	15	18
8	(Netherlands) J Arends (Netherlands) J Maas	10	21	21
Q3	(Malaysia) Chiang JS (Malaysia) Tan CS	21	11	11
(Indonesia) J Arbitama (Indonesia) Siswanto	21	11	18
(Austria) R Gnedt (Austria) W Gnedt	18	21	21

Second Round
3	(England) C Langridge (England) P Mills	21	21
(Switzerland) F Schmid (Switzerland) G Tripet	11	16
8	(Netherlands) J Arends (Netherlands) J Maas	21	11
(Austria) R Gnedt (Austria) W Gnedt	9	3^{r}

Quarterfinals
3	(England) C Langridge (England) P Mills	21	12	23
8	(Netherlands) J Arends (Netherlands) J Maas	13	21	25

=== Bottom half ===
==== Section 3 ====
First Round
(France) B Careme (France) R Labar	21	21
(Czech Republic) P Florian (Czech Republic) O Kopriva	14	14
(Germany) I Kindervater (Germany) M Schwenger	14	21	22
PFQ	(Germany) F Holzer (Germany) M Lamsfuss	21	16	24
(Austria) J Koch (Denmark) C Thomsen	21	21
(Belgium) M Dierickx (Belgium) F Golinski	12	18
(Germany) P Kaesbauer (Germany) J Zurwonne	23	21
4	(Poland) A Cwalina (Poland) P Wacha	21	11

Second Round
(France) B Careme (France) R Labar	21	21
PFQ	(Germany) F Holzer (Germany) M Lamsfuss	13	15
(Austria) J Koch (Denmark) C Thomsen	23	19	11
(Germany) P Kaesbauer (Germany) J Zurwonne	21	21	21

Quarterfinals
(France) B Careme (France) R Labar	21	21
(Germany) P Kaesbauer (Germany) J Zurwonne	16	15

==== Section 4 ====
First Round
(Sweden) N Ruponen (Sweden) J Nordh	21	21
Q1	(Germany) P Discher (Germany) T Nirschl	13	13
Q2	(Germany) D Benz (Malaysia) Chan KB	11	7
6	(Thailand) W Ampunsuwan (Thailand) P Chalardchaleam	21	21
(Indonesia) C Rusdianto (Indonesia) T Wardhana	16	8
(Denmark) A Rasmussen (Denmark) K Sorensen	21	21
(Germany) R Beck (Germany) A Heinz	16	13
2	(England) C Adcock (England) A Ellis	21	21

Second Round
(Sweden) N Ruponen (Sweden) J Nordh	12	13
6	(Thailand) W Ampunsuwan (Thailand) P Chalardchaleam	21	21
(Denmark) A Rasmussen (Denmark) K Sorensen	22	21
2	(England) C Adcock (England) A Ellis	20	18

Quarterfinals
6	(Thailand) W Ampunsuwan (Thailand) P Chalardchaleam	21	17	19
(Denmark) A Rasmussen (Denmark) K Sorensen	18	21	21

== Women's doubles ==
=== Seeds ===
1. (Germany) Birgit Michels / Johanna Goliszewski (quarter-final)
2. (England) Heather Olver / Kate Robertshaw (semi-final)
3. (England) Gabrielle White / Lauren Smith (quarter-final)
4. (Malaysia) Ng Hui Ern / Ng Hui Lin (final)

=== Finals ===
Semifinals
(Netherlands) Eefje Muskens (Netherlands) Selena Piek	21	21
3	(England) Gabrielle White (England) Lauren Smith	16	19
4	(Malaysia) Ng Hui Ern (Malaysia) Ng Hui Lin	21	21
2	(England) Heather Olver (England) Kate Robertshaw	13	11

Final
(Netherlands) Eefje Muskens (Netherlands) Selena Piek	22	21
4	(Malaysia) Ng Hui Ern (Malaysia) Ng Hui Lin	20	15

=== Top half ===
==== Section 1 ====
First Round
1	(Germany) B Michels (Germany) J Goliszewski
BYE
(Austria) N Herbst (Austria) J Lais	13	13
(Germany) L Kaminski (Germany) H Pohl	21	21
(Netherlands) E Muskens (Netherlands) S Piek	21	21
(Russia) N Vislova (Russia) A Chervaykova	11	18
(Ukraine) A Dmytryshyn (Ukraine) D Samarchants	21	16	21
(Germany) A Hammes (Germany) E Janssens	18	21	13

Second Round
1	(Germany) B Michels (Germany) J Goliszewski	21	21
(Germany) L Kaminski (Germany) H Pohl	10	15
(Netherlands) E Muskens (Netherlands) S Piek	21	21
(Ukraine) A Dmytryshyn (Ukraine) D Samarchants	10	7

Quarterfinals
1	(Germany) B Michels (Germany) J Goliszewski	18	17
(Netherlands) E Muskens (Netherlands) S Piek	21	21

==== Section 2 ====
First Round
3	(England) G White (England) L Smith
BYE
(Luxembourg) S Hargiono (Luxembourg) M Have	10	17
(Wales) S Thomas (Wales) C Turner	21	21
(Russia) I Khlebko (Russia) K Polikarpova	21	21
(Germany) K Kattenbeck (Germany) F Volkmann	10	14
(Germany) B Bellenberg (Germany) R Hacks	16	21	10
(France) P Le Buhanic (France) E Lefel	21	15	21

Second Round
3	(England) G White (England) L Smith	21	21
(Wales) S Thomas (Wales) C Turner	12	15
(Russia) I Khlebko (Russia) K Polikarpova	21	16	21
(France) P Le Buhanic (France) E Lefel	12	21	16

Quarterfinals
3	(England) G White (England) L Smith	21	21
(Russia) I Khlebko (Russia) K Polikarpova	11	17

=== Bottom half ===
==== Section 3 ====
First Round
(Germany) N Burger (Germany) V Charoloy	wo
(Denmark) L Grebak (Denmark) M Helsbol
(Switzerland) A Huser (Switzerland) S Jaquet	21	26
(Belgium) S Annys (Belgium) S Corvilain	18	24
(Germany) A Dorr (Germany) A Horbach	14	11
(India) J Gutta (India) A Ponnappa	21	21
BYE
4	(Malaysia) Ng HE (Malaysia) Ng HL

Second Round
(Denmark) L Grebak (Denmark) M Helsbol	21	21
(Switzerland) A Huser (Switzerland) S Jaquet	13	18
(India) J Gutta (India) A Ponnappa	15	16
4	(Malaysia) Ng HE (Malaysia) Ng HL	21	21

Quarterfinals
(Denmark) L Grebak (Denmark) M Helsbol	11	26
4	(Malaysia) Ng HE (Malaysia) Ng HL	21	28

==== Section 4 ====
First Round
(Ukraine) N Voytsekh (Ukraine) Y Zharka	21	21
(Germany) C Kunzmann (Germany) A Oliwa	17	16
(Russia) T Bibik (Russia) E Bolotova	16	20
(Germany) C Nelte (Germany) I Herttrich	21	21
(Austria) S Kohlfurst (Austria) N Ziesig	wo
(Scotland) J Cooper (Scotland) K Gilmour
BYE
2	(England) H Olver (England) K Robertshaw

Second Round
(Ukraine) N Voytsekh (Ukraine) Y Zharka	12	13
(Germany) C Nelte (Germany) I Herttrich	21	21
(Scotland) J Cooper (Scotland) K Gilmour	20	12
2	(England) H Olver (England) K Robertshaw	22	21

Quarterfinals
(Germany) C Nelte (Germany) I Herttrich	13	21	15
2	(England) H Olver (England) K Robertshaw	21	17	21

== Mixed doubles ==
=== Seeds ===
1. (Germany) Michael Fuchs / Birgit Michels (champion)
2. (England) Chris Adcock / Gabrielle White (final)
3. (Denmark) Anders Kristiansen / Julie Houmann (second round)
4. (England) Chris Langridge / Heather Olver (semi-final)
5. (Scotland) Robert Blair / Imogen Bankier (first round)
6. (India) Tarun Kona / Ashwini Ponnappa (first round)
7. (Republic of Ireland) Sam Magee / Chloe Magee (second round)
8. (Germany) Peter Kaesbauer / Isabel Herttrich (quarter-final)

=== Finals ===
Semifinals
1	(Germany) Michael Fuchs (Germany) Birgit Michels	21	21
4	(England) Chris Langridge (England) Heather Olver	17	7
(Thailand) Maneepong Jongjit (Thailand) Sapsiree Taerattanachai	13	21	17
2	(England) Chris Adcock (England) Gabrielle White	21	11	21

Final
1	(Germany) Michael Fuchs (Germany) Birgit Michels	21	21
2	(England) Chris Adcock (England) Gabrielle White	19	15

=== Top half ===
==== Section 1 ====
First Round
1	(Germany) M Fuchs (Germany) B Michels	21	21
(Belgium) F Golinski (Belgium) S Corvilain	10	15
Q3	(Germany) F Holzer (Germany) B Bellenberg	7	9
(Germany) M Schwenger (Germany) C Nelte	21	21
5	(Scotland) R Blair (Scotland) I Bankier	21	19	17
(Netherlands) J Arends (Netherlands) S Piek	10	21	21
(Denmark) A Rasmussen (Denmark) L Grebak	21	21
Q4	(Germany) J Schoettler (Germany) J Goliszewski	15	13

Second Round
1	(Germany) M Fuchs (Germany) B Michels	21	21
(Germany) M Schwenger (Germany) C Nelte	13	13
(Netherlands) J Arends (Netherlands) S Piek	21	21	21
(Denmark) A Rasmussen (Denmark) L Grebak	23	16	19

Quarterfinals
1	(Germany) M Fuchs (Germany) B Michels	16	21	21
(Netherlands) J Arends (Netherlands) S Piek	21	18	19

==== Section 2 ====
First Round
4	(England) C Langridge (England) H Olver	21	21
(Sweden) J Nordh (Sweden) E Lennartsson	10	13
(Germany) S Rduch (Germany) A Hammes	21	21
(Ukraine) K Leonov (Ukraine) M Ulitina	16	12
7	(Republic of Ireland) S Magee (Republic of Ireland) C Magee	21	22
(Germany) A Heinz (Germany) A Horbach	10	20
(Russia) V Durkin (Russia) N Vislova	21	21
(France) B Careme (Malaysia) Ng HL	11	17

Second Round
4	(England) C Langridge (England) H Olver	21	21
(Germany) S Rduch (Germany) A Hammes	5	14
7	(Republic of Ireland) S Magee (Republic of Ireland) C Magee	21	22	19
(Russia) V Durkin (Russia) N Vislova	16	24	21

Quarterfinals
4	(England) C Langridge (England) H Olver	21	9	21
(Russia) V Durkin (Russia) N Vislova	13	21	15

=== Bottom half ===
==== Section 3 ====
First Round
(England) A Ellis (England) L Smith	21	21
Q2	(Czech Republic) O Kopriva (Czech Republic) K Tomalova	13	9
Q1	(Ukraine) D Zavadsky (Ukraine) A Dmytryshyn	12	10
8	(Germany) P Kaesbauer (Germany) I Herttrich	21	21
(France) R Labar (France) E Lefel	14	24
(Thailand) M Jongjit (Thailand) S Taerattanachai	21	26
(Poland) R Mateusiak (Poland) A Wojtkowska	8	14
3	(Denmark) A Kristiansen (Denmark) J Houmann	21	21

Second Round
(England) A Ellis (England) L Smith	10	15
8	(Germany) P Kaesbauer (Germany) I Herttrich	21	21
(Thailand) M Jongjit (Thailand) S Taerattanachai	22	21
3	(Denmark) A Kristiansen (Denmark) J Houmann	20	19

Quarterfinals
8	(Germany) P Kaesbauer (Germany) I Herttrich	18	21
(Thailand) M Jongjit (Thailand) S Taerattanachai	21	23

==== Section 4 ====
First Round
(Netherlands) J Maas (Netherlands) I Tabeling	21	17	15
(Germany) J Jansen (Germany) C Jansen	19	21	21
(Sweden) N Ruponen (Sweden) A Hogstrom	15	21	21
6	(India) T Kona (India) A Ponnappa	21	19	17
(Denmark) K Sorensen (Denmark) M Helsbol	21	21
(Ukraine) V Konov (Ukraine) D Samarchants	14	11
(Russia) A Ashmarin (Russia) E Bolotova	17	17
2	(England) C Adcock (England) G White	21	21

Second Round
(Germany) J Jansen (Germany) C Jansen	19	21	17
(Sweden) N Ruponen (Sweden) A Hogstrom	21	19	21
(Denmark) K Sorensen (Denmark) M Helsbol	6	8
2	(England) C Adcock (England) G White	21	21

Quarterfinals
(Sweden) N Ruponen (Sweden) A Hogstrom	23	17	14
2	(England) C Adcock (England) G White	21	21	21

Preceded by 2013 Dutch Open Grand Prix	BWF Grand Prix Gold and Grand Prix; 2013 season	Succeeded by 2013 Korea Open Grand Prix Gold
