= 2014 Uber Cup qualification =

- Date: 6 March 2014
- Nations: 27

The 2014 Uber Cup qualification process took place on 6 March 2014 to decide the final 16 teams that will compete in the 2014 Uber Cup.

== Qualified teams ==
Country	Confederation	Qualified as	Qualified on	World Women's Team Rankings	Final appearance
India	Badminton Asia	Host country	April 2013	7th	4th
China	Badminton Asia	2012 Uber Cup winner	27 May 2012	1st	16th
Japan	Badminton Asia	Second ranking in Asia	6 March 2014	2nd	22nd
Thailand	Badminton Asia	Third best ranking in Asia	6 March 2014	3rd	4th
South Korea	Badminton Asia	Fourth best ranking in Asia	6 March 2014	4th	16th
Indonesia	Badminton Asia	Fifth best ranking in Asia	6 March 2014	5th	22nd
Chinese Taipei	Badminton Asia	Seventh best ranking in Asia	6 March 2014	8th	4th
Hong Kong	Badminton Asia	Eighth best ranking in Asia	6 March 2014	10th	6th
Singapore	Badminton Asia	Ninth best ranking in Asia	6 March 2014	11th	2nd
Malaysia	Badminton Asia	Tenth best ranking in Asia	6 March 2014	12th	10th
Denmark	Badminton Europe	Best ranking in Europe	6 March 2014	5th	18th
Germany	Badminton Europe	Second best ranking in Europe	6 March 2014	9th	7th
England	Badminton Europe	Third best ranking in Europe	6 March 2014	13th	14th
Russia	Badminton Europe	Fourth best ranking in Europe	6 March 2014	14th	2nd
Canada	Badminton Pan Am	Best ranking in Pan America	6 March 2014	15th	Debut
Australia	Badminton Oceania	Best ranking in Oceania	6 March 2014	16th	6th

== Qualification process ==
=== World team rankings ===
In June 2012, the Badminton World Federation announced that the continental qualifiers would be temporarily scrapped. Therefore, the qualification of every national team for the 2014 Uber Cup was determined based on their national ranking.

BWF World Women's Team Rankings as of 6 March 2014
#		Country	Conf.	First women's singles			Second women's singles			Third women's singles			First women's doubles			Second women's doubles			Points	Seeding
#		Country	Conf.	Player	Rank	Point	Player	Rank	Point	Player	Rank	Point	Player	Rank	Point	Player	Rank	Point	Points	Seeding
1	Steady	China	BA	Li Xuerui	1	89,000	Wang Shixian	3	77,170	Wang Yihan	4	76,958	Wang Xiaoli / Yu Yang	1	88,645	Ma Jin / Tang Jinhua	4	65,390	397,163	1
2	Steady	Japan	BA	Sayaka Takahashi	11	51,517	Eriko Hirose	15	47,910	Minatsu Mitani	16	47,457	Misaki Matsutomo / Ayaka Takahashi	3	70,440	Reika Kakiiwa / Miyuki Maeda	9	56,390	273,714	2
3	Steady	Thailand	BA	Ratchanok Intanon	2	54,460	Porntip Buranaprasertsuk	10	51,227	Nitchaon Jindapol	12	51,348	Duanganong Aroonkesorn / Kunchala Voravichitchaikul	11	32,810	Savitree Amitrapai / Narissapat Lam	29	27,333	217,178	3/4
4	Steady	South Korea	BA	Sung Ji-hyun	5	66,908	Bae Yeon-ju	6	64,440	Kim Hyo-min	90	15,920	Jung Kyung-eun / Kim Ha-na	7	58,010	Chang Ye-na / Kim So-yeong	8	57,070	262,348	3/4
5	Steady	Indonesia	BA	Lindaweni Fanetri	18	43,762	Bellaetrix Manuputty	26	37,880	Aprilia Yuswandari	30	34,051	Pia Zebadiah Bernadet / Johanna Goliszewski	6	58,270	Nitya Krishinda Maheswari / Greysia Polii	10	55,170	229,133	5/8
6	Steady	Denmark	BE	Line Kjærsfeldt	55	24,741	Sandra-Maria Jensen	73	20,567	Anna Thea Madsen	78	19,650	Kamilla Rytter Juhl / Christinna Pedersen	2	79,338	Line Damkjær Kruse / Marie Røpke	19	37,598	181,894	5/8
7	Steady	India	BA	Saina Nehwal	7	59,680	P. V. Sindhu	9	55,752	Arundhati Pantawane	40	30,220	Pradnya Gadre / Ashwini Ponnappa	59	18,347	Jwala Gutta / Ashwini Ponnappa	65	17,460	181,459	5/8
8	Steady	Chinese Taipei	BA	Tai Tzu-ying	8	59,649	Pai Hsiao-ma	25	37,920	Hsu Ya-ching	56	24,100	Cheng Wen-hsing / Hsieh Pei-chen	35	30,045	Chen Hsiao-huan / Lai Chia-wen	55	19,450	171,164	5/8
9	Steady	Germany	BE	Juliane Schenk	14	48,930	Karin Schnaase	46	28,148	Olga Konon	105	14,913	Birgit Michels / Johanna Goliszewski	25	34,541	Isabel Herttrich / Carla Nelte	40	27,271	153,803	9/16
10	Steady	Hong Kong	BA	Yip Pui Yin	22	41,529	Chan Tsz Ka	33	32,760	Cheung Ngan Yi	131	12,480	Poon Lok Yan / Tse Ying Suet	14	43,824	Chan Hung Yung / Yuen Sin Ying	97	11,860	142,031	9/16
11	Steady	Singapore	BA	Gu Juan	21	41,840	Chen Jiayuan	69	21,320	Xing Aiying	86	16,570	Shinta Mulia Sari / Yao Lei	20	36,851	Fu Mingtian / Vanessa Neo	42	25,450	142,031	9/16
12	Steady	Malaysia	BA	Tee Jing Yi	51	26,949	Yang Li Lian	83	17,360	Soniia Cheah Su Ya	123	13,240	Vivian Hoo / Woon Khe Wei	17	43,330	Ng Hui Ern / Ng Hui Lin	23	35,500	136,379	9/16
13	Steady	Bulgaria	BE	Linda Zetchiri	35	32,142	Petya Nedelcheva	39	30,404	Stefani Stoeva	53	25,221	Gabriela Stoeva / Stefani Stoeva	33	31,392	Petya Nedelcheva / Dimitria Popstoikova	109	10,167	129,326	9/16
14	Steady	England	BE	Sarah Walker	70	21,132	Fontaine Chapman	77	20,039	Panuga Riou	85	16,635	Kate Robertshaw / Heather Olver	27	33,640	Lauren Smith / Gabby Adcock	30	32,433	123,879	9/16
15	Steady	Canada	BPA	Michelle Li	24	37,981	Charmaine Reid	100	15,230	Kristen Tsai	106	14,905	Grace Gao / Michelle Li	67	17,298	Alex Bruce / Phyllis Chan	83	14,284	99,698	9/16
16	Steady	Australia	BO	Tara Pilven	95	15,496	Joy Lai	148	11,108	Verdet Kessler	166	9,799	Jacqueline Guan / Gronya Somerville	43	24,255	Tang Hetian / Renuga Veeran	69	16,922	77,580	9/16
Reserve
17	Steady	Russia	BE	Natalia Perminova	50	27,527	Ksenia Polikarpova	59	23,422	Olga Golovanova	62	23,280	Irina Khlebko / Ksenia Polikarpova	41	26,480	Tatjana Bibik / Anastasia Chervyakova	50	21,781	122,490	R1
18	Steady	France	BE	Sashina Vignes Waran	38	30,418	Perrine Le Buhanic	92	15,786	Delphine Lansac	157	10,437	Émilie Lefel / Audrey Fontaine	48	22,967	Lorraine Baumann / Teshana Vignes Waran	66	17,362	96,970	R2
19	Steady	Spain	BE	Carolina Marín	13	49,770	Beatriz Corrales	27	37,214	Clara Azurmendi	441	1,842	Laura Molina / Haideé Ojeda	185	5,190	María Márquez Díaz / Ana Peñas	350	2,390	96,406	R3
20	Steady	Netherlands	BE	Soraya de Visch Eijbergen	102	15,100	Gayle Mahulette	190	7,633	Patty Stolzenbach	217	5,989	Eefje Muskens / Selena Piek	15	43,788	Samantha Barning / Iris Tabeling	71	16,694	89,204	R4
21	Steady	United States	BPA	Jamie Subandhi	45	28,269	Iris Wang	170	9,606	Christine Look	203	6,750	Eva Lee / Paula Lynn Obanana	22	35,505	Annie Xu / Kerry Xu	233	3,850	83,980	R5
22	Steady	Scotland	BE	Kirsty Gilmour	20	42,588	Rebekka Findlay	382	2,297	Emma Cook	718	810	Jillie Cooper / Kirsty Gilmour	45	23,967	Kirsty Gilmour / Imogen Bankier	102	10,712	80,374	R6
23	Steady	Australia	BO	Tara Pilven	95	15,496	Joy Lai	148	11,108	Verdet Kessler	166	9,799	Jacqueline Guan / Gronya Somerville	43	24,255	Tang Hetian / Renuga Veeran	69	16,922	77,580	R7
24	Steady	New Zealand	BO	Michelle Chan	74	20,392	Anna Rankin	81	18,844	Vicki Copeland	281	4,170	Anna Rankin / Madeleine Stapleton	52	20,851	Amanda Brown / Kritteka Gregory	108	10,225	74,482	R8
25	Steady	Ukraine	BE	Marjia Ulitina	63	22,660	Natalya Voytsekh	109	14,704	Yuliya Kazarinova	206	6,657	Anastasiya Dmytryshyn / Darya Samarchants	80	15,020	Natalya Voytsekh / Yelyzaveta Zharka	85	13,583	72,624	R9
26	Steady	Switzerland	BE	Sabrina Jaquet	43	28,687	Nicole Schaller	84	17,200	Ayla Huser	183	8,423	Ayla Huser / Sabrina Jaquet	94	12,212	Marion Gruber / Tiffany Girona	240	3,675	70,197	R10
27	Steady	Czech Republic	BE	Kristína Gavnholt	37	31,292	Zuzana Pavelková	89	15,933	Lucie Černá	143	11,274	Kateřina Tomalová / Šárka Křížková	134	7,450	Lucie Černá / Zuzana Pavelková	353	2,370	68,319	R11
