= 2014 Swiss Open Grand Prix Gold =

Tournament details
- Dates: March 11, 2014 - March 16, 2014
- Total prize money: US$125,000
- Venue: St. Jakobshalle
- Location: Basel, Switzerland

Champions
- Men's singles: (Denmark) Viktor Axelsen
- Women's singles: (China) Wang Yihan
- Men's doubles: (China) Chai Biao (China) Hong Wei
- Women's doubles: (China) Bao Yixin (China) Tang Jinhua
- Mixed doubles: (England) Chris Adcock (England) Gabrielle Adcock

The 2014 Swiss Open Grand Prix Gold was the third grand prix gold and grand prix tournament of the 2014 BWF Grand Prix Gold and Grand Prix. The tournament was held in St. Jakobshalle, Basel, Switzerland from March 11–16, 2014 and had a total purse of $125,000.

== Players by nation ==
Nation	First round	Second round	Third round	Quarterfinals	Semifinals	Final
(Switzerland)	18	1				
(Indonesia)	7	4	1	5		1
(England)	7	1		2		
(France)	6	2	1			
(Denmark)	5	6		2	2	
(Netherlands)	5	2	1	1		
(Czech Republic)	5	1	1			
(Sweden)	4	1		1		
(India)	4		1	1	2	
(Germany)	3	10	1	1		
(Malaysia)	3	1	1			
(Austria)	3					
(South Korea)	2	3		2	2	
(Poland)	2	2				
(Bulgaria)	2	1				
(Republic of Ireland)	2	1				
(Scotland)	2	1				
(Chinese Taipei)	1	2		1	2	
(Italy)	1					
(Finland)	1					
(Slovenia)	1					
(Norway)	1					
(Macau)	1					
(Japan)	1					
(New Zealand)	1					
(Belgium)	1					
(Russia)	1					
(China)		2	1	3	2	4
(Croatia)		1				
(United States)				1		

== Men's singles ==
=== Seeds ===
1. (Denmark) Jan Ø. Jørgensen (semi-final)
2. (South Korea) Son Wan-ho (quarter-final)
3. (India) Kashyap Parupalli (semi-final)
4. (England) Rajiv Ouseph (quarter-final)
5. (India) Srikanth Kidambi (first round)
6. (Chinese Taipei) Chou Tien-chen (quarter-final)
7. (Denmark) Hans-Kristian Vittinghus (withdrew)
8. (Denmark) Viktor Axelsen (champion)

=== Finals ===
Quarterfinals
1	(Denmark) Jan Ø. Jørgensen	21	21
(Sweden) Henri Hurskainen	15	7
4	(England) Rajiv Ouseph	21	16	16
8	(Denmark) Viktor Axelsen	19	21	21
6	(Chinese Taipei) Chou Tien-chen	15	23	18
3	(India) Kashyap Parupalli	21	21	21
(China) Tian Houwei	21	21
2	(South Korea) Son Wan-ho	18	19

Semifinals
1	(Denmark) Jan Ø. Jørgensen	21	13	14
8	(Denmark) Viktor Axelsen	13	21	21
3	(India) Kashyap Parupalli	17	11
(China) Tian Houwei	21	21

Final
8	(Denmark) Viktor Axelsen	21	16	25
(China) Tian Houwei	7	21	23

=== Top half ===
==== Section 1 ====
First Round
1	(Denmark) J Jørgensen
BYE
(Austria) M Almer	16	21	16
(Denmark) K Bruun	21	16	21
(Switzerland) M Bony	12	14
(Sweden) M Borg	21	21
(Germany) D Domke	21	21
(Switzerland) J Panier	6	11

Second Round
1	(Denmark) J Jørgensen	11
(Denmark) K Bruun	2^{r}
(Sweden) M Borg	15	17
(Germany) D Domke	21	21

Third Round
1	(Denmark) J Jørgensen	21	19	21
(Germany) D Domke	13	21	11

==== Section 2 ====
First Round
5	(India) S Kidambi	21	18	17
(Sweden) H Hurskainen	19	21	21
(France) B Leverdez	wo
(Poland) M Rogalski
(Finland) E Heino	21	21
(Bulgaria) S Makarski	18	14
(Switzerland) K Schaffluetzel	10	4
(Czech Republic) P Koukal	21	21

Second Round
(Sweden) H Hurskainen	21	9	21
(Poland) M Rogalski	14	21	16
(Finland) E Heino	6	21	18
(Czech Republic) P Koukal	21	17	21

Third Round
(Sweden) H Hurskainen	21	21
(Czech Republic) P Koukal	15	18

==== Section 3 ====
First Round
4	(England) R Ouseph	21	21
(Switzerland) L Nussbaumer	12	6
(Italy) I Ade Chandra	12	12
(China) Gao H	21	21
(Germany) D Benz	24	21
(Switzerland) Y Freysinger	22	10
(France) A Genin	18	13
(Netherlands) E Pang	21	21

Second Round
4	(England) R Ouseph	21	19	21
(China) Gao H	15	21	14
(Germany) D Benz	16	9
(Netherlands) E Pang	21	21

Third Round
4	(England) R Ouseph	21	21
(Netherlands) E Pang	13	15

==== Section 4 ====
First Round
8	(Denmark) V Axelsen	21	21
(Switzerland) C Kirchmayr	6	11
(France) G-Urban Samson	13	10
(South Korea) Lee D-k	21	21
(Switzerland) J Koenig	10	9
(China) Chen YK	21	21
(Indonesia) J Arbitama	16	11
(Malaysia) Chan KB	21	21

Second Round
8	(Denmark) V Axelsen	21	21
(South Korea) Lee D-k	8	19
(China) Chen YK	21	20	21
(Malaysia) Chan KB	16	22	14

Third Round
8	(Denmark) V Axelsen	17	21	21
(China) Chen YK	21	16	13

=== Bottom half ===
==== Section 5 ====
First Round
(Malaysia) Loke KP	17	10
(India) A Pawar	21	21
(Austria) R Gnedt	11	15
(Germany) T Wadenka	21	21
(Switzerland) B Schaller	19	19
(Canada) L Couture	21	21
(France) V Heriau	6	15
6	(Chinese Taipei) Chou T-c	21	21

Second Round
(India) A Pawar	21	21
(Germany) T Wadenka	11	4
(Canada) L Couture	18	5
6	(Chinese Taipei) Chou T-c	21	21

Third Round
(India) A Pawar	21	12	12
6	(Chinese Taipei) Chou T-c	14	21	21

==== Section 6 ====
First Round
(Switzerland) Y Hogianto	wo
(Malaysia) B Wong
(France) L Mittelheisser	16	21	17
(Croatia) L Zdenjak	21	15	21
(Sweden) G Ulldahl	wo
(Germany) L Schmidt
(Netherlands) E Meijs	17	15
3	(India) K Parupalli	21	21

Second Round
(Malaysia) B Wong	15	21	21
(Croatia) L Zdenjak	21	17	15
(Germany) L Schmidt	15	14
3	(India) K Parupalli	21	21

Third Round
(Malaysia) B Wong	23	9	14
3	(India) K Parupalli	21	21	21

==== Section 7 ====
First Round
(Czech Republic) P Florian	14	16
(China) Tian HW	21	21
(France) L Corvee	21	21
(Czech Republic) J Frohlich	17	14
(Switzerland) M Fux	13	16
(Republic of Ireland) J Dolan	21	21
(Indonesia) A Tedjono
7	(Denmark) H Vittinghus	wo

Second Round
(China) Tian HW	21	21
(France) L Corvee	18	13
(Republic of Ireland) J Dolan	16	17
(Indonesia) A Tedjono	21	21

Third Round
(China) Tian HW	21	21
(Indonesia) A Tedjono	14	11

==== Section 8 ====
First Round
(France) T Rouxel	21	21
(Switzerland) P Deschnaux	8	8
(Finland) V Lang	wo
(Switzerland) A Dumartheray
(Norway) P Withers	22	11
(Indonesia) V Anindita	24	21
(Switzerland) R Manavalan	7	10
2	(South Korea) Son W-h	21	21

Second Round
(France) T Rouxel	21	21
(Switzerland) A Dumartheray	15	18
(Indonesia) V Anindita	7	11
2	(South Korea) Son W-h	21	21

Third Round
(France) T Rouxel	11	15
2	(South Korea) Son W-h	21	21

== Women's singles ==
=== Seeds ===
1. (China) Wang Yihan (champion)
2. (Thailand) Ratchanok Inthanon (withdrew)
3. (China) Wang Shixian (quarter-final)
4. (South Korea) Sung Ji-hyun (semi-final)
5. (South Korea) Bae Yeon-ju (withdrew)
6. (India) Saina Nehwal (quarter-final)
7. (India) Pusarla Venkata Sindhu (semi-final)
8. (Spain) Carolina Marin (withdrew)

=== Finals ===
Semifinals
1	(China) Wang Yihan	21	21
4	(South Korea) Sung Ji-hyun	12	9
7	(India) P. V. Sindhu	21	12	19
(China) Sun Yu	18	21	21

Final
1	(China) Wang Yihan	21	21	21
(China) Sun Yu	23	9	11

=== Top half ===
==== Section 1 ====
First Round
1	(China) Wang YH	21	21
Q4	(Czech Republic) L Cerna	6	9
Q3	(Chinese Taipei) Pai Y-p	21	21
(Republic of Ireland) C Magee	17	15
6	(India) S Nehwal	21	21
Q1	(Japan) C Hoshi	12	12
(France) S Vignes Waran	21	21
(Denmark) A Madsen	17	4

Second Round
1	(China) Wang YH	21	21
Q3	(Chinese Taipei) Pai Y-p	15	14
6	(India) S Nehwal	21	21
(France) S Vignes Waran	7	13

Quarterfinals
1	(China) Wang YH	21	21
6	(India) S Nehwal	17	12

==== Section 2 ====
First Round
4	(South Korea) Sung J-h	21	21
(Chinese Taipei) Hsu Y-c	10	12
(Bulgaria) S Stoeva	21	24	17
(Czech Republic) K Gavnholt	14	26	21
PFQ	(Czech Republic) Z Pavelkova	11	13
(United States) Zhang BW	21	21
(Indonesia) B Manuputty	22	21
(New Zealand) M Chan Ky	20	18

Second Round
4	(South Korea) Sung J-h	21	21
(Czech Republic) K Gavnholt	10	15
(United States) Zhang BW	22	21
(Indonesia) B Manuputty	20	19

Quarterfinals
4	(South Korea) Sung J-h	14	21	21
(United States) Zhang BW	21	15	11

=== Bottom half ===
==== Section 3 ====
First Round
(Russia) E Diehl	wo
(Canada) M Li
PFQ	(Malaysia) S Saniru	18	15
7	(India) P Sindhu	21	21
(Denmark) S Jensen	21	21
(Austria) S Prutsch	11	14
(India) S Rane	8	9
3	(China) Wang SX	21	21

Second Round
(Canada) M Li	21	16	11
7	(India) P Sindhu	19	21	21
(Denmark) S Jensen	11	12
3	(China) Wang SX	21	21

Quarterfinals
7	(India) P Sindhu	21	21
3	(China) Wang SX	17	15

==== Section 4 ====
First Round
(Indonesia) L Fanetri	16	13
(Scotland) K Gilmour	21	21
(China) Sun Y	21	21
PFQ	(Netherlands) S Eijbergen	7	7
(Germany) K Schnaase	13	22	21
(Switzerland) S Jaquet	21	20	19
Q2	(China) Liu X	21	21
PFQ	(Sweden) M Petersen	6	19

Second Round
(Scotland) K Gilmour	13	17
(China) Sun Y	21	21
(Germany) K Schnaase	5	3^{r}
Q2	(China) Liu X	21	11

Quarterfinals
(China) Sun Y	21	21
Q2	(China) Liu X	19	15

== Men's doubles ==
=== Seeds ===
1. (Denmark) Mathias Boe / Carsten Mogensen (semi-final)
2. (Chinese Taipei) Lee Sheng-mu / Tsai Chia-hsin (semi-final)
3. (England) Chris Adcock / Andrew Ellis (first round)
4. (China) Chai Biao / Hong Wei (champion)
5. (Indonesia) Markus Fernaldi Gideon / Markis Kido (quarter-final)
6. (Indonesia) Berry Angriawan / Ricky Karanda Suwardi (quarter-final)
7. (South Korea) Ko Sung-hyun / Shin Baek-cheol (first round)
8. (China) Kang Jun / Liu Cheng (quarter-final)

=== Finals ===
Semifinals
1	(Denmark) Mathias Boe (Denmark) Carsten Mogensen	15	20
4	(China) Chai Biao (China) Hong Wei	21	22
Q3	(China) Fu Haifeng (China) Zhang Nan	21	21
2	(Chinese Taipei) Lee Sheng-mu (Chinese Taipei) Tsai Chia-hsin	17	7

Final
4	(China) Chai Biao (China) Hong Wei	22	21
Q3	(China) Fu Haifeng (China) Zhang Nan	20	14

=== Top half ===
==== Section 1 ====
First Round
1	(Denmark) M Boe (Denmark) C Mogensen	21	21
(Indonesia) Y Dasuki (Indonesia) A Saputra	14	6
(Netherlands) R Bosch (Netherlands) K Ridder	21	21
(Poland) A Cwalina (Poland) P Wacha	16	6
5	(Indonesia) M Gideon (Indonesia) M Kido	25	21
(England) C Coles (England) M Nottingham	23	12
(Germany) M Fuchs (Germany) J Schöttler	21	21
(Canada) K Li (Canada) N Yakura	11	12

Second Round
1	(Denmark) M Boe (Denmark) C Mogensen	21	21
(Netherlands) R Bosch (Netherlands) K Ridder	9	14
5	(Indonesia) M Gideon (Indonesia) M Kido	18	21	21
(Germany) M Fuchs (Germany) J Schöttler	21	15	17

Quarterfinals
1	(Denmark) M Boe (Denmark) C Mogensen	21	16	21
5	(Indonesia) M Gideon (Indonesia) M Kido	11	21	5

==== Section 2 ====
First Round
4	(China) Chai B (China) Hong W	21	21
PFQ	(Germany) A Heinz (Germany) M Schwenger	13	16
(Republic of Ireland) J Dolan (Republic of Ireland) S Magee	14	21	22
Q1	(Switzerland) A Ruhanda (Switzerland) U Suherlan	21	16	20
7	(South Korea) Ko S-h (South Korea) Shin B-c	19	23
(Indonesia) W Nayaka (Indonesia) A Yusuf	21	25
(Germany) D Benz (Malaysia) Chan KB	19	18
(England) C Langridge (England) P Mills	21	21

Second Round
4	(China) Chai B (China) Hong W	21	21
(Republic of Ireland) J Dolan (Republic of Ireland) S Magee	10	10
(Indonesia) W Nayaka (Indonesia) A Yusuf	21	19	16
(England) C Langridge (England) P Mills	18	21	21

Quarterfinals
4	(China) Chai B (China) Hong W	21	21
(England) C Langridge (England) P Mills	18	10

=== Bottom half ===
==== Section 3 ====
First Round
(Denmark) A Rasmussen (Denmark) K Sorensen	21	21
(Poland) L Moren (Poland) W Szkudlarczyk	13	15
(Netherlands) J Arends (Netherlands) J Maas	12	21	15
8	(China) Kang J (China) Liu C	21	19	21
Q2	(England) M Ellis (England) T Wolfenden	19	14
(Germany) P Kaesbauer (Germany) J Zurwonne	21	21
Q3	(China) Fu HF (China) Zhang N	21	21
3	(England) C Adcock (England) A Ellis	19	12

Second Round
(Denmark) A Rasmussen (Denmark) K Sorensen	21	11	19
8	(China) Kang J (China) Liu C	11	21	21
(Germany) P Kaesbauer (Germany) J Zurwonne	10	11
Q3	(China) Fu HF (China) Zhang N	21	21

Quarterfinals
8	(China) Kang J (China) Liu C	18	11
Q3	(China) Fu HF (China) Zhang N	21	21

==== Section 4 ====
First Round
(Denmark) N Nohr (Denmark) N Overgaard	21	22
PFQ	(Switzerland) F Schmid (Switzerland) G Tripet	17	20
(Germany) R Beck (Germany) I Kindervater	13	17
6	(Indonesia) B Angriawan (Indonesia) R Suwardi	21	21
(Denmark) M Conrad-Petersen (Denmark) M Kolding	21	21
(Malaysia) Chow PC (Malaysia) Mak HC	15	13
Q4	(France) V Heriau (France) L Mittelheisser	10	12
2	(Chinese Taipei) Lee S-m (Chinese Taipei) Tsai C-h	21	21

Second Round
(Denmark) N Nohr (Denmark) N Overgaard	21	17	19
6	(Indonesia) B Angriawan (Indonesia) R Suwardi	18	21	21
(Denmark) M Conrad-Petersen (Denmark) M Kolding	9	18
2	(Chinese Taipei) Lee S-m (Chinese Taipei) Tsai C-h	21	21

Quarterfinals
6	(Indonesia) B Angriawan (Indonesia) R Suwardi	18	14
2	(Chinese Taipei) Lee S-m (Chinese Taipei) Tsai C-h	21	21

== Women's doubles ==
=== Seeds ===
1. (Denmark) Kamilla Rytter Juhl / Christinna Pedersen (quarter-final)
2. (China) Bao Yixin / Tang Jinhua (champion)
3. (South Korea) Jung Kyung-eun / Kim Ha-na (quarter-final)
4. (Indonesia) Pia Zebadiah Bernadeth / Rizki Amelia Pradipta (quarter-final)
5. (South Korea) Jang Ye-na / Kim So-young (semi-final)
6. (Indonesia) Nitya Krishinda Maheswari / Greysia Polii (final)
7. (China) Luo Ying / Luo Yu (semi-final)
8. (Netherlands) Eefje Muskens / Selena Piek (quarter-final)

=== Finals ===
Semifinals
6	(Indonesia) Nitya Krishinda Maheswari (Indonesia) Greysia Polii	21	21
7	(China) Luo Ying (China) Luo Yu	16	9
5	(South Korea) Jang Ye-na (South Korea) Kim So-young	12	16
2	(China) Bao Yixin (China) Tang Jinhua	21	21

Final
6	(Indonesia) Nitya Krishinda Maheswari (Indonesia) Greysia Polii	21	16	13
2	(China) Bao Yixin (China) Tang Jinhua	19	21	21

=== Top half ===
==== Section 1 ====
First Round
1	(Denmark) K Juhl (Denmark) C Pedersen	21	10	21
(Indonesia) S Andini (Indonesia) T Nuraidah	14	21	10
PFQ	(Switzerland) A Huser (Switzerland) S Jaquet	13	10
(Thailand) S Amitrapai (Thailand) L Narissapat	21	21
6	(Indonesia) N Maheswari (Indonesia) G Polii	19	22	21
(Scotland) I Bankier (Scotland) K Gilmour	21	20	11
(India) J Gutta (India) A Ponnappa	19	21	18
(Germany) I Herttrich (Germany) C Nelte	21	13	21

Second Round
1	(Denmark) K Juhl (Denmark) C Pedersen	21	21
(Thailand) S Amitrapai (Thailand) L Narissapat	10	16
6	(Indonesia) N Maheswari (Indonesia) G Polii	21	21
(Germany) I Herttrich (Germany) C Nelte	18	12

Quarterfinals
1	(Denmark) K Juhl (Denmark) C Pedersen	16	17
6	(Indonesia) N Maheswari (Indonesia) G Polii	21	21

==== Section 2 ====
First Round
3	(South Korea) Jung K-e (South Korea) Kim H-n	25	22
(Indonesia) A Awanda (Indonesia) D Haris	23	20
(England) H Olver (England) K Robertshaw	21	21
(Belgium) S Annys (Belgium) S Corvilain	8	14
7	(China) Luo Y (China) Luo Y	21	21
(France) A Fontaine (France) E Lefel	11	17
(Netherlands) S Barning (Netherlands) I Tabeling	6	14
(South Korea) Lee S-h (South Korea) Shin S-c	21	21

Second Round
3	(South Korea) Jung K-e (South Korea) Kim H-n	21	21
(England) H Olver (England) K Robertshaw	15	7
7	(China) Luo Y (China) Luo Y	21	21
(South Korea) Lee S-h (South Korea) Shin S-c	19	19

Quarterfinals
3	(South Korea) Jung K-e (South Korea) Kim H-n	21	19	20
7	(China) Luo Y (China) Luo Y	18	21	22

=== Bottom half ===
==== Section 3 ====
First Round
(Bulgaria) G Stoeva (Bulgaria) S Stoeva	21	21
(Czech Republic) S Krizkova (Czech Republic) K Tomalova	11	10
(England) S Brown (England) A Lim	7	10
5	(South Korea) Jang Y-n (South Korea) Kim S-y	21	21
(Germany) J Goliszewski (Germany) B Michels	21	21
Q4	(Switzerland) M Gruber (Switzerland) S Keller	8	11
(Macau) Wang R (Macau) Zhang ZB	15	19
4	(Indonesia) P Bernadeth (Indonesia) R Pradipta	21	21

Second Round
(Bulgaria) G Stoeva (Bulgaria) S Stoeva	15	10
5	(South Korea) Jang Y-n (South Korea) Kim S-y	21	21
(Germany) J Goliszewski (Germany) B Michels	11	21	20
4	(Indonesia) P Bernadeth (Indonesia) R Pradipta	21	17	22

Quarterfinals
5	(South Korea) Jang Y-n (South Korea) Kim S-y	21	22
4	(Indonesia) P Bernadeth (Indonesia) R Pradipta	12	20

==== Section 4 ====
First Round
(Chinese Taipei) Cheng W-h (Chinese Taipei) Hsieh P-c	21	21
(England) G Adcock (England) L Smith	19	17
Q2	(Czech Republic) L Cerna (Czech Republic) Z Pavelkova	8	10
8	(Netherlands) E Muskens (Netherlands) S Piek	21	21
Q1	(Slovenia) T Kodric (Switzerland) J Stocker	12	9
Q3	(Japan) A Kurihara (Japan) N Shinoya	21	21
(Denmark) M Fruergaard (Denmark) S Thygesen	16	11
2	(China) Bao YX (China) Tang JH	21	21

Second Round
(Chinese Taipei) Cheng W-h (Chinese Taipei) Hsieh P-c	18	21	16
8	(Netherlands) E Muskens (Netherlands) S Piek	21	15	21
Q3	(Japan) A Kurihara (Japan) N Shinoya	21	12	17
2	(China) Bao YX (China) Tang JH	16	21	21

Quarterfinals
8	(Netherlands) E Muskens (Netherlands) S Piek	12	9
2	(China) Bao YX (China) Tang JH	21	21

== Mixed doubles ==
=== Seeds ===
1. (China) Xu Chen / Ma Jin (withdrew)
2. (Denmark) Joachim Fischer Nielsen / Christinna Pedersen (quarter-final)
3. (England) Chris Adcock / Gabrielle Adcock (champion)
4. (Indonesia) Markis Kido / Pia Zebadiah Bernadeth (quarter-final)
5. (South Korea) Ko Sung-hyun / Kim Ha-na (first round)
6. (Germany) Michael Fuchs / Birgit Michels (second round)
7. (Indonesia) Riky Widianto / Richi Puspita Dili (first round)
8. (England) Chris Langridge / Heather Olver (first round)

=== Finals ===
Semifinals
(China) Chai Biao (China) Tang Jinhua	21	15	21
(Chinese Taipei) Chen Hung-ling (Chinese Taipei) Cheng Wen-hsing	16	21	16
3	(England) Chris Adcock (England) Gabrielle Adcock	21	19	21
(China) Liu Cheng (China) Bao Yixin	18	21	17

Final
(China) Chai Biao (China) Tang Jinhua	17	13
3	(England) Chris Adcock (England) Gabrielle Adcock	21	21

=== Top half ===
==== Section 1 ====
First Round
PFQ	(England) M Nottingham (England) L Smith	12	11
(Denmark) M Kolding (Denmark) K Juhl	21	21
Q3	(Germany) J Schoettler (Germany) J Goliszewski	15	14
(China) Chai B (China) Tang JH	21	21
8	(England) C Langridge (England) H Olver	21	16	15
(Netherlands) J de Ruiter (Netherlands) S Barning	15	21	21
PFQ	(Sweden) J Nordh (Sweden) E Lennartsson	12	16
(Germany) P Kaesbauer (Germany) I Herttrich	21	21

Second Round
(Denmark) M Kolding (Denmark) K Juhl	19	13
(China) Chai B (China) Tang JH	21	21
(Netherlands) J de Ruiter (Netherlands) S Barning	9	18
(Germany) P Kaesbauer (Germany) I Herttrich	21	21

Quarterfinals
(China) Chai B (China) Tang JH	21	21
(Germany) P Kaesbauer (Germany) I Herttrich	11	14

==== Section 2 ====
First Round
4	(Indonesia) M Kido (Indonesia) P Bernadeth	21	21
(Denmark) A Kristiansen (Denmark) J Houmann	19	16
(Denmark) A Rasmussen (Denmark) L Grebak	12	16
Q2	(Indonesia) M Rijal (Indonesia) V Marissa	21	21
5	(South Korea) Ko S-h (South Korea) Kim H-n	21	13	18
(Chinese Taipei) Chen H-l (Chinese Taipei) Cheng W-h	17	21	21
(Germany) M Schwenger (Germany) C Nelte	14	23	21
(Sweden) N Ruponen (Sweden) A Hogstrom	21	21	19

Second Round
4	(Indonesia) M Kido (Indonesia) P Bernadeth	19	21	21
Q2	(Indonesia) M Rijal (Indonesia) V Marissa	21	10	14
(Chinese Taipei) Chen H-l (Chinese Taipei) Cheng W-h	17	21	21
(Germany) M Schwenger (Germany) C Nelte	21	12	18

Quarterfinals
4	(Indonesia) M Kido (Indonesia) P Bernadeth	21	8	13
(Chinese Taipei) Chen H-l (Chinese Taipei) Cheng W-h	13	21	21

=== Bottom half ===
==== Section 3 ====
First Round
(India) T Kona (India) A Ponnappa	10	21	13
(Poland) R Mateusiak (Poland) A Wojtkowska	21	16	21
Q4	(Indonesia) P Jordan (Indonesia) D Susanto	21	15	21
7	(Indonesia) R Widianto (Indonesia) R Dili	18	21	18
(Denmark) N Nohr (Denmark) S Thygesen	21	10	9
(South Korea) Shin B-c (South Korea) Eom H-w	14	21	21
(Indonesia) M Gideon (Indonesia) R Pradipta	14	18
3	(England) C Adcock (England) G Adcock	21	21

Second Round
(Poland) R Mateusiak (Poland) A Wojtkowska	14	17
Q4	(Indonesia) P Jordan (Indonesia) D Susanto	21	21
(South Korea) Shin B-c (South Korea) Eom H-w	17	12
3	(England) C Adcock (England) G Adcock	21	21

Quarterfinals
Q4	(Indonesia) P Jordan (Indonesia) D Susanto	23	14	17
3	(England) C Adcock (England) G Adcock	21	21	21

==== Section 4 ====
First Round
(Scotland) R Blair (Scotland) I Bankier	17	21	12
(China) Liu C (China) Bao YX	21	12	21
(Republic of Ireland) S Magee (Republic of Ireland) C Magee	18	18
6	(Germany) M Fuchs (Germany) B Michels	21	21
(Netherlands) J Arends (Netherlands) S Piek	10	21	21
Q1	(China) Lu K (China) Huang YQ	21	19	23
PFQ	(England) C Coles (England) A Lim	10	18
2	(Denmark) J Nielsen (Denmark) C Pedersen	21	21

Second Round
(China) Liu C (China) Bao YX	22	26
6	(Germany) M Fuchs (Germany) B Michels	20	24
Q1	(China) Lu K (China) Huang YQ	20	17
2	(Denmark) J Nielsen (Denmark) C Pedersen	22	21

Quarterfinals
(China) Liu C (China) Bao YX	21	18	21
2	(Denmark) J Nielsen (Denmark) C Pedersen	12	21	14

Preceded by 2014 German Open Grand Prix Gold	BWF Grand Prix Gold and Grand Prix; 2014 season	Succeeded by 2014 Malaysia Grand Prix Gold
