= 2014 Dutch Open Grand Prix =

Badminton championships

Tournament details
- Dates: October 7, 2014 - October 12, 2014
- Total prize money: US$50,000
- Venue: Topsportcentrum
- Location: Almere, Netherlands

The 2014 Dutch Open Grand Prix was the fortieth grand prix gold and grand prix tournament of the 2014 BWF Grand Prix Gold and Grand Prix in Badminton. The tournament was held in Topsportcentrum, Almere, Netherlands October 7 until October 12, 2014 and had a total purse of $50,000.

== Players by nation ==
Nation	First round	Second round	Third round	Quarterfinals	Semifinals	Final
(Germany)	12	5	1	3		
(Netherlands)	9	7			1	1
(France)	8	3	1			
(Switzerland)	7					
(England)	6	4		3	2	
(Indonesia)	5	5		6	4	3
(Bulgaria)	5			1		
(Belgium)	5	1				
(Czech Republic)	4	1				
(Sweden)	4	1				
(Austria)	3					
(Russia)	2	5			1	
(Malaysia)	2	2	1			
(Finland)	2	2				
(United States)	2					
(New Zealand)	2					
(Nigeria)	2					
(Scotland)	2					
(Latvia)	2					
(Spain)	2					
(Hong Kong)	1	1	2	2	1	
(Philippines)	1	1			1	
(Lithuania)	1			1		
(Cuba)	1					
(Italy)	1					
(Slovakia)	1					
(Croatia)	1					
(Poland)	1					
(Uganda)	1					
(Zambia)	1					
(Ukraine)		2	1	2		
(Chinese Taipei)		1	1	2		1
(Denmark)		1				
(India)		1				

== Men's singles ==
=== Seeds ===
1. (England) Rajiv Ouseph (semi-final)
2. (France) Brice Leverdez (third round)
3. (Indonesia) Dionysius Hayom Rumbaka (quarter-final)
4. (Netherlands) Eric Pang (second round)
5. (Germany) Dieter Domke (withdrew)
6. (Cuba) Osleni Guerrero (withdrew)
7. (Hong Kong) Ng Ka Long (quarter-final)
8. (Ukraine) Dmytro Zavadsky (second round)
9. (Indonesia) Andre Kurniawan Tedjono (semi-final)
10. (France) Lucas Corvee (first round)
11. (Malaysia) Tan Chun Seang (third round)
12. (Denmark) Joachim Persson (second round)
13. (India) Ajay Jayaram (champion)
14. (Czech Republic) Petr Koukal (second round)
15. (India) Arvind Bhat (second round)
16. (France) Thomas Rouxel (second round)

=== Finals ===
Quarterfinals
1	(England) Rajiv Ouseph	11	11	11
(Lithuania) Kestutis Navickas	4	6	5
3	(Indonesia) Dionysius Hayom Rumbaka	11	11	6	7	5
13	(India) Ajay Jayaram	9	9	11	11	11
(Indonesia) Ihsan Maulana Mustofa	11	9	11	11
(Indonesia) Jonatan Christie	6	11	4	9
7	(Hong Kong) Ng Ka Long	11	11	10	9	7
9	(Indonesia) Andre Kurniawan Tedjono	9	2	11	11	11

Semifinals
1	(England) Rajiv Ouseph	8	7	5
13	(India) Ajay Jayaram	11	11	11
(Indonesia) Ihsan Maulana Mustofa	11	11	11
9	(Indonesia) Andre Kurniawan Tedjono	10	9	7

Final
13	(India) Ajay Jayaram	10	11	11	1	11
(Indonesia) Ihsan Maulana Mustofa	11	6	7	11	9

=== Top half ===
==== Section 1 ====
First Round
1	(England) R Ouseph	11	11	11
(France) A Genin	3	7	7
(Canada) T Chiu	11	7	11	11
Q8	(Switzerland) K Schaffluetzel	7	11	10	10
11	(Malaysia) Tan CS	9	10	11	11	11
Q4	(Germany) F Roth	11	11	8	9	7
(Austria) V Vattanirappel	8	7	4
(Sweden) M Borg	11	11	11

Second Round
1	(England) R Ouseph	11	11	11
(Canada) T Chiu	6	3	5
11	(Malaysia) Tan CS	11	5
(Sweden) M Borg	5	2^{r}

Quarterfinals
1	(England) R Ouseph	11	11	9	7	11
11	(Malaysia) Tan CS	8	8	11	11	8

==== Section 2 ====
First Round
PFQ	(England) M Spencer-Smith	11	4	3	6
(Czech Republic) P Florian	9	11	11	11
Q2	(Germany) P Kaemnitz	6	8	7
(Lithuania) K Navickas	11	11	11
10	(France) L Corvee	7	7	11	5
(Ukraine) V Atraschenkov	11	11	7	11
(Czech Republic) J Frohlich	9	4	10
(Indonesia) A Pratama	11	11	11

Second Round
(Czech Republic) P Florian	2	5	4
(Lithuania) K Navickas	11	11	11
(Ukraine) V Atrashchenkov	11	11	11
(Indonesia) A Pratama	9	10	3

Quarterfinals
(Lithuania) K Navickas	9	11	11	10	11
(Ukraine) V Atrashchenkov	11	10	8	11	10

==== Section 3 ====
First Round
3	(Indonesia) H Rumbaka	11	11	11
Q6	(Switzerland) A Dumartheray	6	5	7
(Netherlands) J Hilbink	11	11	6	5	4
(Russia) A Yartsev	8	10	11	11	11
12	(Denmark) J Persson	4	11	11	11
(United States) B Seguin	11	6	9	5
(France) M Baumann	6	9	7
Q7	(Germany) A Trisnanto	11	11	11

Second Round
3	(Indonesia) H Rumbaka	11	11	11
(Russia) A Yartsev	7	8	5
12	(Denmark) J Persson	3	10	11	11	9
Q7	(Germany) A Trisnanto	11	11	8	7	11

Quarterfinals
3	(Indonesia) H Rumbaka	11	11	11
Q7	(Germany) A Trisnanto	6	6	4

==== Section 4 ====
First Round
6	(Cuba) O Guerrero	wo
(Netherlands) M Caljouw
(Hong Kong) Tam CH	11	11	10	11
Q4	(Netherlands) J Teeuwen	9	3	11	7
13	(India) A Jayaram	11	11	9	11
(Netherlands) E Meijs	10	7	11	1
(Finland) E Heino	11	11	11
PFQ	(Germany) D Benz	5	4	9

Second Round
(Netherlands) M Caljouw	9	10	11	5
(Hong Kong) Tam CH	11	11	6	11
13	(India) A Jayaram	11	11	11
(Finland) E Heino	4	9	6

Quarterfinals
(Hong Kong) Tam CH	5	6	4
13	(India) A Jayaram	11	11	11

=== Bottom half ===
==== Section 5 ====
First Round
(Bulgaria) B Kisyov	5	11	10	9^{r}
(Netherlands) N Fransman	11	10	11	10
Q1	(Netherlands) J Natenstedt	6	5	11	7
14	(Czech Republic) P Koukal	11	11	8	11
(Finland) K Koljonen	10	9	11	6
(Indonesia) I Mustofa	11	11	10	11
(England) S Parsons	11	10	3	7
8	(Ukraine) D Zavadsky	4	11	11	11

Second Round
(Netherlands) N Fransman	8	11	11	10	11
14	(Czech Republic) P Koukal	11	6	6	11	6
(Indonesia) I Mustofa	11	11	10	11
8	(Ukraine) D Zavadsky	10	7	11	4

Quarterfinals
(Netherlands) N Fransman	0	11	4	8
(Indonesia) I Mustofa	11	9	11	11

==== Section 6 ====
First Round
(Italy) I Ade Chandra	4	10	8
(Hong Kong) Chan YK	11	11	11
(Scotland) K Merrilees	7	9	8
15	(India) A Bhat	11	11	11
Q3	(Bulgaria) S Makarski	5	11	5	11	7
(Indonesia) J Christie	11	2	11	10	11
(England) T Penty	10	5	9
4	(Netherlands) E Pang	11	11	11

Second Round
(Hong Kong) Chan YK	11	11	5	11
15	(India) A Bhat	6	6	11	3
(Indonesia) J Christie	11	9	4	11	11
4	(Netherlands) E Pang	8	11	11	6	10

Quarterfinals
(Hong Kong) Chan YK	4	11	10	7
(Indonesia) J Christie	11	4	11	11

==== Section 7 ====
First Round
(Chinese Taipei) Lin C-h	7	11	11	11
(Sweden) J Nilsson	11	7	8	10
(Austria) M Almer	7	3	11	9
16	(France) T Rouxel	11	11	6	11
(Finland) K Lehikoinen	10	6	10
(Ukraine) A Pochtarev	11	11	11
(Slovakia) J Vicen	6	5	4
7	(Hong Kong) Ng KL	11	11	11

Second Round
(Chinese Taipei) Lin C-h	11	11	11
16	(France) T Rouxel	8	8	6
(Ukraine) A Pochtarev	11	8	5	4
7	(Hong Kong) Ng KL	8	11	11	11

Quarterfinals
(Chinese Taipei) Lin C-h	9	11	7	8
7	(Hong Kong) Ng KL	11	5	11	11

==== Section 8 ====
First Round
(Malaysia) Chiang JS	1
(Germany) T Wadenka	0^{r}
(Belgium) Y Tan	11	9	9	10
9	(Indonesia) A Tedjono	10	11	11	11
(England) R Walker	11	11	11
(Sweden) G Ulldahl	10	10	10
(Indonesia) T Mahbub	6	11	5	6
2	(France) B Leverdez	11	3	11	11

Second Round
(Malaysia) Chiang JS	9	8	4
9	(Indonesia) A Tedjono	11	11	11
(England) R Walker	7	6	5
2	(France) B Leverdez	11	11	11

Quarterfinals
9	(Indonesia) A Tedjono	11	11	11
2	(France) B Leverdez	8	5	7

== Women's singles ==
=== Seeds ===
1. (United States) Zhang Beiwen (champion)
2. (Czech Republic) Kristina Gavnholt (withdrew)
3. (Germany) Karin Schnaase (quarter-final)
4. (France) Sashina Vignes Waran (first round)
5. (Chinese Taipei) Pai Yu-po (final)
6. (Russia) Natalia Perminova (withdrew)
7. (Indonesia) Maria Febe Kusumastuti (semi-final)
8. (Bulgaria) Stefani Stoeva (first round)

=== Finals ===
Semifinals
1	(United States) Zhang Beiwen	11	11	6	11
7	(Indonesia) Maria Febe Kusumastuti	5	4	11	9
5	(Chinese Taipei) Pai Yu-po	11	11	11
(England) Fontaine Mica Chapman	6	6	10

Final
1	(United States) Zhang Beiwen	11	11	11
5	(Chinese Taipei) Pai Yu-po	9	7	8

=== Top half ===
==== Section 1 ====
First Round
1	(United States) Zhang BW	11	11	11
(England) N Cerfontyne	4	4	6
PFQ	(Lithuania) A Stapusaityte	11	3	6	9
(France) P Le Buhanic	10	11	11	11
PFQ	(Indonesia) H Ramadini	11	11	11
(New Zealand) A Rankin	6	6	2
(Netherlands) S Eijbergen	11	4	4	9
(Chinese Taipei) Chang Y-l	8	11	11	11

Second Round
1	(United States) Zhang BW	11	11	11
(France) P Le Buhanic	5	3	5
PFQ	(Indonesia) H Ramadini	11	11	11
(Netherlands) S Eijbergen	9	10	10

Quarterfinals
1	(United States) Zhang BW	11	11	11
PFQ	(Indonesia) H Ramadini	8	8	10

==== Section 2 ====
First Round
3	(Germany) K Schnaase	11	7	11	11
(Hong Kong) Cheung NY	9	11	9	4
PFQ	(Ukraine) N Voytsekh	11	11	11
(Czech Republic) Z Pavelkova	7	6	6
7	(Indonesia) M Kusumastuti	11	11	11
(Nigeria) G Gabriel	5	6	5
(Finland) N Vainio	11	8	11	10	11
Q1	(Indonesia) D Ayustine	4	11	7	11	10

Second Round
3	(Germany) K Schnaase	11	11	11
PFQ	(Ukraine) N Voytsekh	9	6	9
7	(Indonesia) M Kusumastuti	11	11	11
(Finland) N Vainio	10	3	3

Quarterfinals
3	(Germany) K Schnaase	11	11	10	7	6
7	(Indonesia) M Kusumastuti	5	5	11	11	11

=== Bottom half ===
==== Section 3 ====
First Round
Q3	(Switzerland) N Schaller	11	8	5	7
(Russia) E Kosetskaya	10	11	11	11
(Indonesia) M Wiranto	6	5	4
5	(Chinese Taipei) Pai Y-p	11	11	11
(Poland) A Narel	9	7	9
(Malaysia) S Saniru	11	11	11
(England) P Riou	9	11	11	11
4	(France) S Vignes Waran	11	10	8	5

Second Round
(Russia) E Kosetskaya	7	10	11	7
5	(Chinese Taipei) Pai Y-p	11	11	10	11
(Malaysia) S Saniru	7	8	11	11	8
(England) P Riou	11	11	6	8	11

Quarterfinals
5	(Chinese Taipei) Pai Y-p	11	11	9	11
(England) P Riou	7	9	11	9

==== Section 4 ====
First Round
Q2	(Netherlands) G Mahulette	11	11	11
(United States) R Schafer	10	7	4
Q4	(Ukraine) Y Zharka	10	11	9	11	11
8	(Bulgaria) S Stoeva	11	5	11	10	3
(Austria) S Prutsch	7	8	11	9
(Belgium) L Tan	11	11	9	11
(England) F Chapman	3
PFQ	(Belgium) M Demy	1^{r}

Second Round
Q2	(Netherlands) G Mahulette	10	6	8
Q4	(Ukraine) Y Zharka	11	11	11
(Belgium) L Tan	6	9	7
(England) F Chapman	11	11	11

Quarterfinals
Q4	(Ukraine) Y Zharka	11	9	7	6
(England) F Chapman	7	11	11	11

== Men's doubles ==
=== Seeds ===
1. (Poland) Adam Cwalina / Przemyslaw Wacha (withdrew)
2. (Chinese Taipei) Huang Po-jui / Lu Ching-yao (second round)
3. (Netherlands) Jacco Arends / Jelle Maas (second round)
4. (France) Baptiste Careme / Ronan Labar (champion)
5. (Indonesia) Selvanus Geh / Kevin Sanjaya Sukamuljo (first round)
6. (Belgium) Matijs Dierickx / Freek Golinski (withdrew)
7. (Germany) Max Schwenger / Josche Zurwonne (quarter-final)
8. (France) Lucas Corvee / Brice Leverdez (second round)

=== Finals ===
Semifinals
(Indonesia) Fran Kurniawan (Indonesia) Agripinna Prima Rahmanto Putra	5	11	11	10	11
Q3	(Netherlands) Ruud Bosch (Chinese Taipei) Tien Tzu-chieh	11	8	9	11	8
4	(France) Baptiste Careme (France) Ronan Labar	11	8	11	11
(Philippines) Philip Escueta (Philippines) Ronel Estanislao	9	11	4	3

Final
(Indonesia) Fran Kurniawan (Indonesia) Agripinna Prima Rahmanto Putra	11	10	10	7
4	(France) Baptiste Careme (France) Ronan Labar	5	11	11	11

=== Top half ===
==== Section 1 ====
First Round
PFQ	(Netherlands) R Jille (Netherlands) R Tabeling	9	9	11	4
(England) P Briggs (England) C Coles	11	11	6	11
Q2	(Chinese Taipei) Lin C-ha (Chinese Taipei) Lin C-hs	11	4	11	9	11
(England) H Towler (Scotland) P Van Rietvelde	10	11	6	11	5
PFQ	(Switzerland) L Gothuey (Switzerland) N Lenggenhager	5	5	6
(Philippines) P Magnaye (Philippines) P Vivas	11	11	11
(Czech Republic) P Florian (Czech Republic) O Kopriva	3	4	3
(Indonesia) F Kurniawan (Indonesia) A Putra	11	11	11

Second Round
(England) P Briggs (England) C Coles	6	11	4	7
Q2	(Chinese Taipei) Lin C-ha (Chinese Taipei) Lin C-hs	11	7	11	11
(Philippines) P Magnaye (Philippines) P Vivas	7	10	10
(Indonesia) F Kurniawan (Indonesia) A Putra	11	11	11

Quarterfinals
Q2	(Chinese Taipei) Lin C-ha (Chinese Taipei) Lin C-hs	4	6	11	10
(Indonesia) F Kurniawan (Indonesia) A Putra	11	11	10	11

==== Section 2 ====
First Round
3	(Netherlands) J Arends (Netherlands) J Maas	11	11	11
(France) B Kersaudy (France) G Mittelheisser	8	8	6
(Germany) R Beck (Germany) A Heinz	11	11	11
(Netherlands) K Ridder (Sweden) N Ruponen	9	10	8
8	(France) L Corvee (France) B Leverdez
(Bulgaria) B Kisyov (Croatia) L Zdenjak	wo
(Germany) P Lang (Germany) T Legleitner	10	2	7
Q3	(Netherlands) R Bosch (Chinese Taipei) Tien T-c	11	11	11

Second Round
3	(Netherlands) J Arends (Netherlands) J Maas	7	8	11	6
(Germany) R Beck (Germany) A Heinz	11	11	9	11
8	(France) L Corvee (France) B Leverdez	6	6	11	11	8
Q3	(Netherlands) R Bosch (Chinese Taipei) Tien T-c	11	11	7	9	11

Quarterfinals
(Germany) R Beck (Germany) A Heinz	7	6	4
Q3	(Netherlands) R Bosch (Chinese Taipei) Tien T-c	11	11	11

=== Bottom half ===
==== Section 3 ====
First Round
(Germany) D Benz (Germany) J Jansen	11	11	11
PFQ	(Spain) J Sanchez (Spain) A Toro	8	5	10
(Hong Kong) Chan YL (Hong Kong) Tang CM	4	6	11	11	9
7	(Germany) M Schwenger (Germany) J Zurwonne	11	11	10	6	11
(Germany) F Holzer (Germany) M Lamsfuss	11	11	11
Q1	(Uganda) E Ekiring (Zambia) E Mambwe	6	1	4
(Switzerland) A Dumartheray (Switzerland) G Tripet	10	7	8
4	(France) B Careme (France) R Labar	11	11	11

Second Round
(Germany) D Benz (Germany) J Jansen	11	4	9	9
7	(Germany) M Schwenger (Germany) J Zurwonne	10	11	11	11
(Germany) F Holzer (Germany) M Lamsfuss	7	8	8
4	(France) B Careme (France) R Labar	11	11	11

Quarterfinals
7	(Germany) M Schwenger (Germany) J Zurwonne	5	11	6	11	10
4	(France) B Careme (France) R Labar	11	9	11	6	11

==== Section 4 ====
First Round
Q4	(Malaysia) Chiang JS (Malaysia) Tan CS	9	8	5
(Russia) R Kargaev (Russia) A Yartsev	11	11	11
(Philippines) P Escueta (Philippines) R Estanislao	6	11	6	11	11
5	(Indonesia) S Geh (Indonesia) K Sukamuljo	11	10	11	7	4
(Indonesia) R Alexander (Indonesia) E Subaktiar	11	11	11
(Belgium) N Marcoen (Belgium) F Oleffe	6	6	3
(Netherlands) M Caljouw (Netherlands) J Teeuwen	7	5	9
2	(Chinese Taipei) Huang P-j (Chinese Taipei) Lu C-y	11	11	11

Second Round
(Russia) R Kargaev (Russia) A Yartsev	11	6	8	5
(Philippines) P Escueta (Philippines) R Estanislao	9	11	11	11
(Indonesia) R Alexander (Indonesia) E Subaktiar	11	10	11	11
2	(Chinese Taipei) Huang P-j (Chinese Taipei) Lu C-y	7	11	6	10

Quarterfinals
(Philippines) P Escueta (Philippines) R Estanislao	9	8	11	11	11
(Indonesia) R Alexander (Indonesia) E Subaktiar	11	11	10	8	10

== Women's doubles ==
=== Seeds ===
1. (Netherlands) Eefje Muskens / Selena Piek (champion)
2. (Bulgaria) Gabriela Stoeva / Stefani Stoeva (quarter-final)
3. (Russia) Anastasia Chervaykova / Nina Vislova (first round)
4. (Indonesia) Shendy Puspa Irawati / Vita Marissa (final)
5. (Netherlands) Samantha Barning / Iris Tabeling (second round)
6. (Indonesia) Maretha Dea Giovani / Rosyita Eka Putri Sari (quarter-final)
7. (England) Heather Olver / Lauren Smith (quarter-final)
8. (Hong Kong) Chan Tsz Ka / Tse Ying Suet (semi-final)

=== Finals ===
Semifinals
1	(Netherlands) Eefje Muskens (Netherlands) Selena Piek	11	11	11
(Indonesia) Della Destiara Haris (Indonesia) Gebby Ristiyani Imawan	9	7	8
4	(Indonesia) Shendy Puspa Irawati (Indonesia) Vita Marissa	11	10	11	5	11
8	(Hong Kong) Chan Tsz Ka (Hong Kong) Tse Ying Suet	10	11	5	11	8

Final
1	(Netherlands) Eefje Muskens (Netherlands) Selena Piek	11	4	11	11
4	(Indonesia) Shendy Puspa Irawati (Indonesia) Vita Marissa	8	11	9	10

=== Top half ===
==== Section 1 ====
First Round
1	(Netherlands) E Muskens (Netherlands) S Piek	11	11	11
PFQ	(Germany) C Bott (Germany) J Karnott	4	8	4
(Nigeria) G Gabriel (Germany) L Kaminski	3	3	1
(Indonesia) R Amelia (Indonesia) K Dewi	11	11	11
7	(England) H Olver (England) L Smith	11	10	11	11
Q4	(France) P Le Buhanic (France) E Lefel	4	11	6	7
(Latvia) M Radovska (New Zealand) A Rankin	6	3	6
(Germany) B Bellenberg (Germany) R Hacks	11	11	11

Second Round
1	(Netherlands) E Muskens (Netherlands) S Piek	11	6	11	11
(Indonesia) R Amelia (Indonesia) K Dewi	10	11	9	3
7	(England) H Olver (England) L Smith	11	11	11
(Germany) B Bellenberg (Germany) R Hacks	4	9	6

Quarterfinals
1	(Netherlands) E Muskens (Netherlands) S Piek	9	11	11	11
7	(England) H Olver (England) L Smith	11	3	2	7

==== Section 2 ====
First Round
3	(Russia) A Chervaykova (Russia) N Vislova	9	8	4
(Indonesia) D Haris (Indonesia) G Imawan	11	11	11
(Indonesia) K Istirani (Indonesia) M Oklamona	11	11	11
(Czech Republic) Z Pavelkova (Czech Republic) K Tomalova	6	3	4
6	(Indonesia) M Giovani (Indonesia) R Putri Sari	11	9	11	11
Q3	(France) L Baumann (France) A Fontaine	4	11	3	1
(Ukraine) N Voytsekh (Ukraine) Y Zharka	7	9	11	11	9
(England) S Brown (England) E Westwood	11	11	8	8	11

Second Round
(Indonesia) D Haris (Indonesia) G Imawan	9	11	11	11
(Indonesia) K Istirani (Indonesia) M Oklamona	11	8	8	7
6	(Indonesia) M Giovani (Indonesia) R Putri Sari	11	11	11
(England) S Brown (England) E Westwood	6	7	7

Quarterfinals
(Indonesia) D Haris (Indonesia) G Imawan	11	11	11
6	(Indonesia) M Giovani (Indonesia) R Putri Sari	10	9	8

=== Bottom half ===
==== Section 3 ====
First Round
(Indonesia) A Awanda (Indonesia) G Widjaja	11	11	11
Q2	(Switzerland) N Fankhauser (Malaysia) S Saniru	5	6	7
Q1	(Belgium) S Annys (Belgium) F Vandenhoucke	8	4	8
5	(Netherlands) S Barning (Netherlands) I Tabeling	11	11	11
(Latvia) I Pope (Latvia) K Sefere	7	5	11	10
(Netherlands) M Halkema (Netherlands) G Mahulette	11	11	9	11
(England) C Birch (England) A Lim	11	2	2	3
4	(Indonesia) S Irawati (Indonesia) V Marissa	8	11	11	11

Second Round
(Indonesia) A Awanda (Indonesia) G Widjaja	8	11	11	11
5	(Netherlands) S Barning (Netherlands) I Tabeling	11	8	10	9
(Netherlands) M Halkema (Netherlands) G Mahulette	8	7	5
4	(Indonesia) S Irawati (Indonesia) V Marissa	11	11	11

Quarterfinals
(Indonesia) A Awanda (Indonesia) G Widjaja	9	7	11	4
4	(Indonesia) S Irawati (Indonesia) V Marissa	11	11	3	11

==== Section 4 ====
First Round
(Indonesia) V Aprilsasi (Indonesia) M Jauhari	11	10	11	11
(Germany) L Efler (Germany) C Jansen	8	11	6	10
(Germany) K Kattenbeck (Germany) F Volkmann	5	3	3
8	(Hong Kong) Chan TK (Hong Kong) Tse YS	11	11	11
(Spain) M Diaz (Germany) A Horbach	5	5	9
(Russia) E Bolotova (Russia) E Kosetskaya	11	11	11
(Netherlands) A Chen (Netherlands) C Seinen	5	4	10
2	(Bulgaria) G Stoeva (Bulgaria) S Stoeva	11	11	11

Second Round
(Indonesia) V Aprilsasi (Indonesia) M Jauhari	11	6	8	9
8	(Hong Kong) Chan TK (Hong Kong) Tse YS	9	11	11	11
(Russia) E Bolotova (Russia) E Kosetskaya	11	1	6	11	8
2	(Bulgaria) G Stoeva (Bulgaria) S Stoeva	9	11	11	10	11

Quarterfinals
8	(Hong Kong) Chan TK (Hong Kong) Tse YS	10	11	11	11
2	(Bulgaria) G Stoeva (Bulgaria) S Stoeva	11	8	6	8

== Mixed doubles ==
=== Seeds ===
1. (Indonesia) Muhammad Rijal / Vita Marissa (second round)
2. (Indonesia) Riky Widianto / Richi Puspita Dili (champion)
3. (Netherlands) Jacco Arends / Selena Piek (first round)
4. (Hong Kong) Chan Yun Lung / Tse Ying Suet (quarter-final)
5. (Russia) Vitalij Durkin / Nina Vislova (semi-final)
6. (Indonesia) Ronald Alexander / Melati Daeva Oktaviani (quarter-final)
7. (Netherlands) Jorrit de Ruiter / Samantha Barning (final)
8. (Russia) Evgenij Dremin / Evgenia Dimova (first round)

=== Finals ===
Semifinals
5	(Russia) Vitalij Durkin (Russia) Nina Vislova	8	9	7
7	(Netherlands) Jorrit de Ruiter (Netherlands) Samantha Barning	11	11	11
(Indonesia) Edi Subaktiar (Indonesia) Gloria Emanuelle Widjaja	5	8	5
2	(Indonesia) Riky Widianto (Indonesia) Richi Puspita Dili	11	11	11

Final
7	(Netherlands) Jorrit de Ruiter (Netherlands) Samantha Barning	10	11	11	8	1
2	(Indonesia) Riky Widianto (Indonesia) Richi Puspita Dili	11	10	9	11	11

=== Top half ===
==== Section 1 ====
First Round
1	(Indonesia) M Rijal (Indonesia) V Marissa	11	11	9	11
Q3	(Indonesia) Y Dasuki (Indonesia) V Aprilsasi	6	9	11	9
(France) G Mittelheisser (France) A Fontaine	11	11	7	8	11
(Netherlands) R Muns (Netherlands) M Halkema	8	8	11	11	9
5	(Russia) V Durkin (Russia) N Vislova	11	10	11	11
(Sweden) J Nordh (Sweden) E Fabbeke	8	11	9	4
Q1	(Philippines) P Vivas (Philippines) J Francisco	5	11	11	5	8
Q2	(Germany) M Lamsfuss (Germany) F Volkmann	11	6	10	11	11

Second Round
1	(Indonesia) M Rijal (Indonesia) V Marissa	11	9	8	10
(France) G Mittelheisser (France) A Fontaine	10	11	11	11
5	(Russia) V Durkin (Russia) N Vislova	11	10	11	11
Q2	(Germany) M Lamsfuss (Germany) F Volkmann	2	11	5	10

Quarterfinals
(France) G Mittelheisser (France) A Fontaine	5	11	8	7
5	(Russia) V Durkin (Russia) N Vislova	11	3	11	11

==== Section 2 ====
First Round
4	(Hong Kong) Chan YL (Hong Kong) Tse YS	11	11	11
(Belgium) F Oleffe (Belgium) S Annys	7	7	5
PFQ	(Germany) F Holzer (Germany) B Bellenberg	5	11	3	7
(Indonesia) F Kurniawan (Indonesia) S Irawati	11	9	11	11
7	(Netherlands) J de Ruiter (Netherlands) S Barning	7	11	11	10	11
(England) M Nottingham (England) A Lim	11	9	5	11	4
(Netherlands) J Maas (Netherlands) I Tabeling	11	11	10	11
(Germany) R Beck (Germany) K Kattenbeck	8	7	11	10

Second Round
4	(Hong Kong) Chan YL (Hong Kong) Tse YS	7	11	8	11	11
(Indonesia) F Kurniawan (Indonesia) S Irawati	11	5	11	6	6
7	(Netherlands) J de Ruiter (Netherlands) S Barning	11	11	10	11
(Netherlands) J Maas (Netherlands) I Tabeling	7	10	11	8

Quarterfinals
4	(Hong Kong) Chan YL (Hong Kong) Tse YS	10	11	11	10	3
7	(Netherlands) J de Ruiter (Netherlands) S Barning	11	4	4	11	11

=== Bottom half ===
==== Section 3 ====
First Round
(Hong Kong) Tang CM (Hong Kong) Chan TK	10	11	11	11
(Bulgaria) S Makarski (Switzerland) C Tripet	11	4	6	8
Q4	(Indonesia) K Sukamuljo (Indonesia) D Haris	11	5	7	10
6	(Indonesia) R Alexander (Indonesia) M Oktaviani	10	11	11	11
(Russia) R Kargaev (Russia) E Bolotova	4	7	5
(Indonesia) E Subaktiar (Indonesia) G Widjaja	11	11	11
(Russia) A Yartsev (Russia) E Kosetskaya	11	7	11	11
3	(Netherlands) J Arends (Netherlands) S Piek	10	11	5	10

Second Round
(Hong Kong) Tang CM (Hong Kong) Chan TK	8	11	6	6
6	(Indonesia) R Alexander (Indonesia) M Oktaviani	11	5	11	11
(Indonesia) E Subaktiar (Indonesia) G Widjaja	6	11	11	11
(Russia) A Yartsev (Russia) E Kosetskaya	11	6	9	4

Quarterfinals
6	(Indonesia) R Alexander (Indonesia) M Oktaviani	7	7	9
(Indonesia) E Subaktiar (Indonesia) G Widjaja	11	11	11

==== Section 4 ====
First Round
(France) M Baumann (France) L Baumann	11	9	4	8
(Ukraine) G Natarov (Ukraine) Y Kazarinova	9	11	11	11
(Germany) J Jansen (Germany) C Jansen	11	11	5	6	11
8	(Russia) E Dremin (Russia) E Dimova	9	10	11	11	8
(England) H Towler (England) E Westwood	11	11	11
(Czech Republic) O Kopriva (Czech Republic) K Tomalova	3	7	3
(France) R Labar (France) E Lefel	4	10	8
2	(Indonesia) R Widianto (Indonesia) R Dili	11	11	11

Second Round
(Ukraine) G Natarov (Ukraine) Y Kazarinova	9	11	11	4	11
(Germany) J Jansen (Germany) C Jansen	11	8	9	11	0
(England) H Towler (England) E Westwood	5	6	11	10
2	(Indonesia) R Widianto (Indonesia) R Dili	11	11	6	11

Quarterfinals
(Ukraine) G Natarov (Ukraine) Y Kazarinova	2	7	11	6
2	(Indonesia) R Widianto (Indonesia) R Dili	11	11	10	11

Preceded by 2014 Indonesia Masters Grand Prix Gold	BWF Grand Prix Gold and Grand Prix; 2014 season	Succeeded by 2014 Bitburger Open Grand Prix Gold
