= 2012 BWF World Junior Championships – Girls singles =

The Girls Singles tournament of the 2012 BWF World Junior Championships was held from October 30 until November 3. The defending champion, Ratchanok Intanon, who won the tournament for 3 years in a row decided not to take part this time even though her age was still eligible.

Japanese girl Nozomi Okuhara, who was beaten by Intanon in the semi-final of the previous year's tournament, won the all-Japanese final against her teammate Akane Yamaguchi 21-12, 21-9.

== Seeded ==
1. (Chinese Taipei) Tai Tzu-ying (quarter-final)
2. (Thailand) Busanan Ongbamrungphan (quarter-final)
3. (Japan) Nozomi Okuhara (champion)
4. (Turkey) Neslihan Yiğit (third round)
5. (China) Sun Yu (semi-final)
6. (United States) Iris Wang (third round)
7. (Bulgaria) Stefani Stoeva (fourth round)
8. (Denmark) Line Kjærsfeldt (third round)
9. (Singapore) Liang Xiaoyu (third round)
10. (South Korea) Kim Hyo-min (fourth round)
11. (Denmark) Sandra-Maria Jensen (third round)
12. (Czech Republic) Lucie Černá (third round)
13. (Indonesia) Hanna Ramadhini (quarter-final)
14. (Japan) Akane Yamaguchi (final)
15. (Canada) Christin Tsai (fourth round)
16. (Russia) Evgeniya Kosetskaya (third round)

== Draw ==
=== Finals ===
Quarterfinals
1 | (Chinese Taipei) Tai Tzu-ying | 21 | 13 | 11
5/8 | (China) Sun Yu | 18 | 21 | 21
3/4 | (Japan) Nozomi Okuhara | 17 | 21 | 21
(South Korea) Ryu Young-seo | 21 | 12 | 8
9/16 | (Japan) Akane Yamaguchi | 21 | 21
9/16 | (Indonesia) Hanna Ramadini | 12 | 18
(Japan) Aya Ohori | 21 | 15 | 21
2 | (Thailand) Busanan Ongbamrungphan | 16 | 21 | 17

Semifinals
5/8 | (China) Sun Yu | 10 | 20
3/4 | (Japan) Nozomi Okuhara | 21 | 22
9/16 | (Japan) Akane Yamaguchi | 17 | 21 | 21
(Japan) Aya Ohori | 21 | 10 | 15

Final
3/4 | (Japan) Nozomi Okuhara | 21 | 21
9/16 | (Japan) Akane Yamaguchi | 12 | 9

=== Top Half ===
==== Section 1 ====
First round
(United States) C Chen | 11 | 8
(Germany) L Heim | 21 | 21
(Belgium) M Demy | 16 | 10
(South Korea) Lee J-m | 21 | 21
(South Africa) A Schoonees | 4 | 9
(Malaysia) Lim YF | 21 | 21
(England) C Birch | 21 | 21
(Uzbekistan) V Mushtakova | 4 | 5

Second round
1 | (Chinese Taipei) Tai T-y | 21 | 21
(Thailand) P Chochuwong | 16 | 19
(Germany) L Heim | 6 | 13
(South Korea) Lee J-m | 21 | 21
9/16 | (Russia) E Kosetskaya | 21 | 21
(France) D Lansac | 14 | 15
(Malaysia) Lim YF | 21 | 21
(England) C Birch | 5 | 10

Third round
1 | (Chinese Taipei) Tai T-y | 21 | 21
(South Korea) Lee J-m | 14 | 13
9/16 | (Russia) E Kosetskaya | 15 | 21 | 12
(Malaysia) Lim YF | 21 | 16 | 21

Fourth round
1 | (Chinese Taipei) Tai T-y | 21 | 21
(Malaysia) Lim YF | 12 | 19

==== Section 2 ====
First round
(Netherlands) A Chen | 14 | 14
(India) R Das | 21 | 21
(Japan) C Hoshi | 21 | 21
(Australia) V Kessler | 6 | 7
(Indonesia) R Hartawan | 17 | 22
(Vietnam) Lê TH | 21 | 24
(Sri Lanka) L Dissanayake | 12 | 7
(Turkey) C Fere | 21 | 21

Second round
5/8 | (China) Sun Y | 21 | 21
(Philippines) M Caculitan | 2 | 5
(India) R Das | 12 | 21 | 21
(Japan) C Hoshi | 21 | 13 | 18
9/16 | (Canada) C Tsai | 21 | 21
(Singapore) F Seah | 6 | 11
(Vietnam) Lê TH | 16 | 21 | 21
(Turkey) C Fere | 21 | 15 | 12

Third round
5/8 | (China) Sun Y | 21 | 21
(India) R Das | 9 | 8
9/16 | (Canada) C Tsai | 21 | 21
(Vietnam) Lê TH | 13 | 14

Fourth round
5/8 | (China) Sun Y | 21 | 21
9/16 | (Canada) C Tsai | 4 | 15

==== Section 3 ====
First round
(Uzbekistan) D Ahmedova | 7 | 10
(Philippines) G De Vera | 21 | 21
(Republic of Ireland) A Stephenson | 13 | 20
(Belgium) F Vandenhoucke | 21 | 22
(Indonesia) R Andriani | 21 | 21
(Australia) J Guan | 13 | 12
(Hong Kong) Ng WY | 21 | 21
(Vietnam) Phạm NT | 11 | 8

Second round
3/4 | (Japan) N Okuhara | 21 | 21
(Chinese Taipei) Yu C-h | 6 | 5
(Philippines) G De Vera | 16 | 7
(Belgium) F Vandenhoucke | 21 | 21
9/16 | (Denmark) S Jensen | 21 | 15 | 21
(Russia) N Rogova | 14 | 21 | 12
(Indonesia) R Andriani | 15 | 21 | 23
(Hong Kong) Ng WY | 21 | 14 | 21

Third round
3/4 | (Japan) N Okuhara | 21 | 21
(Belgium) F Vandenhoucke | 2 | 5
9/16 | (Denmark) S Jensen | 20 | 12
(Indonesia) R Andriani | 22 | 21

Fourth round
3/4 | (Japan) N Okuhara | 21 | 21
(Indonesia) R Andriani | 6 | 9

==== Section 4 ====
First round
(South Africa) J van der Vyver | 8 | 12
(France) A Tran | 21 | 21
(Malaysia) Ho YM | 21 | 21
(Turkey) E Yazgan | 8 | 7
(India) R Pillai | 15 | 21
(Ukraine) A Dmytryshyn | 21 | 23
(South Korea) Ryu Y-s | 21 | 21
(United States) A Lin | 5 | 6

Second round
5/8 | (Bulgaria) S Stoeva | 21 | 21
(Thailand) A Sapniti | 18 | 12
(France) A Tran | 8 | 10
(Malaysia) Ho YM | 21 | 21
9/16 | (Czech Republic) L Černá | 21 | 21
(Germany) L Kaepplein | 13 | 12
(Ukraine) A Dmytryshyn | 10 | 6
(South Korea) Ryu Y-s | 21 | 21

Third round
5/8 | (Bulgaria) S Stoeva | 21 | 21
(Malaysia) Ho YM | 12 | 12
9/16 | (Czech Republic) L Černá | 11 | 21 | 12
(South Korea) Ryu Y-s | 21 | 19 | 21

Fourth round
5/8 | (Bulgaria) S Stoeva | 17 | 17
(South Korea) Ryu Y-s | 21 | 21

=== Bottom Half ===
==== Section 5 ====
First round
(Canada) A Holcek | 5 | 9
(South Korea) Lee M-j | 21 | 21
(Ukraine) V Gushcha | 11^{r}
(Russia) E Pyatina | 11
(Philippines) M Alcala
(Sri Lanka) T Hendahewa | wo
(Thailand) M Phattanaphitoon | 21 | 21
(Uzbekistan) M Pakina | 10 | 14

Second round
(South Korea) Lee M-j | 21 | 21
(Russia) E Pyatina | 10 | 12
(Bulgaria) M Ivanova | 5 | 14
9/16 | (Japan) A Yamaguchi | 21 | 21
(Philippines) M Alcala | 17 | 21 | 21
(Thailand) M Phattanaphitoon | 21 | 11 | 16
(Czech Republic) I Zychová | 7 | 6
5/8 | (Denmark) L Kjærsfeldt | 21 | 21

Third round
(South Korea) Lee M-j | 21 | 7 | 15
9/16 | (Japan) A Yamaguchi | 19 | 21 | 21
(Philippines) M Alcala | 21 | 21
5/8 | (Denmark) L Kjærsfeldt | 19 | 16

Fourth round
9/16 | (Japan) A Yamaguchi | 21 | 21
(Philippines) M Alcala | 14 | 15

==== Section 6 ====
First round
(India) R Gadde | 21 | 21
(Finland) A Paavola | 8 | 5
(France) M Batomene | 21 | 21
(England) V Williams | 19 | 10
(Singapore) Yeo JM | 11 | 11
(Chinese Taipei) Lin Y-c | 21 | 21
(China) Qin JJ | 21 | 21
(Germany) A Dorr | 7 | 9

Second round
(India) R Gadde | 21 | 21
(France) M Batomene | 10 | 13
(Malaysia) Yap RC | 21 | 18 | 20
9/16 | (Indonesia) H Ramadini | 13 | 21 | 22
(Chinese Taipei) Lin Y-c | 15 | 21 | 13
(China) Qin JJ | 21 | 16 | 21
(Hong Kong) Cheun YM | 21 | 12 | 7
3/4 | (Turkey) N Yiğit | 19 | 21 | 21

Third round
(India) R Gadde | 11 | 14
9/16 | (Indonesia) H Ramadini | 21 | 21
(China) Qin JJ | 21 | 21
3/4 | (Turkey) N Yiğit | 17 | 13

Fourth round
9/16 | (Indonesia) H Ramadini | 21 | 21
(China) Qin JJ | 16 | 14

==== Section 7 ====
First round
(Sri Lanka) S Illangakoon | 11 | 7
(Japan) A Ohori | 21 | 21
(Indonesia) S Mapasa | 19 | 21 | 21
(Bulgaria) M Mitsova | 21 | 8 | 11
(Czech Republic) M Svetnickova | 21 | 13 | 20
(Ukraine) D Samarchants | 17 | 21 | 2
(England) J Moore | 5 | 18
(China) Zheng Y | 21 | 21

Second round
(Japan) A Ohori | 21 | 21
(Indonesia) S Mapasa | 5 | 5
(Australia) N Sharp | 11 | 5
9/16 | (Singapore) Liang XY | 21 | 21
(Ukraine) D Samarchants | 3 | 5
(China) Zheng Y | 21 | 21
(Vietnam) Nguyễn TL | 21 | 18 | 13
5/8 | (United States) I Wang | 18 | 21 | 21

Third round
(Japan) A Ohori | 21 | 21
9/16 | (Singapore) Liang XY | 13 | 10
(China) Zheng Y | 21 | 21
5/8 | (United States) I Wang | 6 | 13

Fourth round
(Japan) A Ohori | 21 | 12 | 21
(China) Zheng Y | 7 | 21 | 10

==== Section 8 ====
First round
(Malaysia) Lim CS | 21 | 19 | 21
(Belgium) S van Wel | 12 | 21 | 17
(Canada) J Wu | 8 | 19
(India) A Sunil | 21 | 21
(Hong Kong) Tsang WC | 21 | 21
(South Africa) D Botha | 5 | 13
(Chinese Taipei) Lee C-h | 21 | 21
(Wales) A Moran | 11 | 10

Second round
(Malaysia) Lim CS | 17 | 21 | 21
(India) A Sunil | 21 | 13 | 9
(Republic of Ireland) R Darragh | 6 | 5
9/16 | (South Korea) Kim H-m | 21 | 21
(Hong Kong) Tsang WC | 19 | 21 | 21
(Chinese Taipei) Lee C-h | 21 | 19 | 19
(Netherlands) K van der Valk | 8 | 4
2 | (Thailand) B Ongbamrungphan | 21 | 21

Third round
(Malaysia) Lim CS | 10 | 13
9/16 | (South Korea) Kim H-m | 21 | 21
(Hong Kong) Tsang WC | 5 | 11
2 | (Thailand) B Ongbamrungphan | 21 | 21

Fourth round
9/16 | (South Korea) Kim H-m | 15 | 9
2 | (Thailand) B Ongbamrungphan | 21 | 21
