= Sun Yu (badminton) =

Chinese badminton player

Sun Yu 孙瑜
Personal information
- Born: 28 February 1994 (age 32) Dalian, Liaoning, China
- Years active: 2012-2017
- Height: 1.83 m (6 ft 0 in)
- Weight: 70 kg (154 lb)

Sport
- Country: China
- Sport: Badminton
- Handedness: Right
- Retired: February 2019

Women's singles
- Career record: 148 wins, 59 losses
- Highest ranking: 4 (2 March 2017)
- BWF profile
Medal record
Women's badminton
Representing China
Sudirman Cup
Silver medal – second place	2017 Gold Coast	Mixed team
Uber Cup
Gold medal – first place	2014 New Delhi	Women's team
Gold medal – first place	2016 Kunshan	Women's team
Asia Team Championships
Gold medal – first place	2016 Hyderabad	Women's team
East Asian Games
Gold medal – first place	2013 Tianjin	Women's team
Summer Universiade
Silver medal – second place	2013 Kazan	Mixed team
World Junior Championships
Gold medal – first place	2012 Chiba	Mixed team
Bronze medal – third place	2012 Chiba	Girls' singles
Asian Junior Championships
Gold medal – first place	2011 Lucknow	Girls' singles
Gold medal – first place	2011 Lucknow	Mixed team
Silver medal – second place	2012 Gimcheon	Mixed team

Sun Yu (Chinese: 孙瑜; pinyin: Sūn Yú; born 28 February 1994) is a Chinese badminton player. She was part of the Chinese winning team of the 2014 and the 2016 Uber Cup.

After a long struggle from serious injury problems, she officially announced her retirement from the national team on 16 August 2018, and from the international badminton circuit in 2019, at a very young age of 25. The last tournament she played was the 2017 World Championships where she ended her campaign as quarter-finalist.

== Achievements ==
=== World Junior Championships ===
Girls' singles
Year	Venue	Opponent	Score	Result
2012	Chiba Port Arena; Chiba, Japan	(Japan) Nozomi Okuhara	10–21, 20–22	Bronze

=== Asian Junior Championships ===
Girls' singles
Year	Venue	Opponent	Score	Result
2011	Babu Banarasi Das Indoor Stadium; Lucknow, India	(China) Shen Yaying	21–8, 21–13	Gold

=== BWF Superseries ===
The BWF Superseries, which was launched on 14 December 2006 and implemented in 2007, was a series of elite badminton tournaments, sanctioned by the Badminton World Federation (BWF). BWF Superseries levels were Superseries and Superseries Premier. A season of Superseries consisted of twelve tournaments around the world that had been introduced since 2011. Successful players were invited to the Superseries Finals, which were held at the end of each year.

Women's singles
Year	Tournament	Opponent	Score	Result
2015	Singapore Open	(Chinese Taipei) Tai Tzu-ying	21–13, 19–21, 22–20	(gold) Winner
2016	Singapore Open	(Thailand) Ratchanok Intanon	21–18, 11–21, 14–21	(silver) Runner-up
2016	Australian Open	(India) Saina Nehwal	21–11, 14–21, 19–21	(silver) Runner-up
2016	Japan Open	(China) He Bingjiao	14–21, 21–7, 18–21	(silver) Runner-up
2016	China Open	(India) P. V. Sindhu	11–21, 21–17, 11–21	(silver) Runner-up

BWF Super Series Finals tournament
BWF Super Series Premier tournament
BWF Super Series tournament

=== BWF Grand Prix ===
The BWF Grand Prix had two levels, the Grand Prix and Grand Prix Gold. It was a series of badminton tournaments sanctioned by the Badminton World Federation (BWF) and played between 2007 and 2017.

Women's singles
Year	Tournament	Opponent	Score	Result
2012	Macau Open	(Thailand) Busanan Ongbamrungphan	21–19, 21–8	(gold) Winner
2014	Swiss Open	(China) Wang Yihan	23–21, 9–21, 11–21	(silver) Runner-up
2014	Bitburger Open	(China) He Bingjiao	16–21, 21–15, 21–12	(gold) Winner
2015	Swiss Open	(Thailand) Busanan Ongbamrungphan	21–16, 21–12	(gold) Winner
2015	Korea Masters	(Japan) Sayaka Sato	20–22, 19–21	(silver) Runner-up
2016	Thailand Masters	(Thailand) Ratchanok Intanon	19–21, 21–18, 17–21	(silver) Runner-up
2016	China Masters	(China) Li Xuerui	16–21, 21–19, 6–21	(silver) Runner-up

BWF Grand Prix Gold tournament
BWF Grand Prix tournament

== Record against selected opponents ==
Record against year-end Finals finalists, World Championships semi-finalists, and Olympic quarter-finalists.

Players	Matches	Results		Difference
Players	Matches	Won	Lost	Difference
(China) Chen Yufei	4	4	0	+4
(China) He Bingjiao	5	3	2	+1
(China) Li Xuerui	9	2	7	–5
(China) Wang Lin	1	0	1	–1
(China) Wang Shixian	4	1	3	–2
(China) Wang Yihan	2	0	2	–2
(Chinese Taipei) Tai Tzu-ying	6	5	1	+4
(Denmark) Tine Baun	1	0	1	–1
(Germany) Juliane Schenk	1	1	0	+1
(Hong Kong) Yip Pui Yin	4	4	0	+4
(India) Saina Nehwal	8	2	6	–4

Players	Matches	Results		Difference
Players	Matches	Won	Lost	Difference
(India) P. V. Sindhu	8	4	4	0
(Indonesia) Lindaweni Fanetri	1	1	0	+1
(Japan) Minatsu Mitani	2	2	0	+2
(Japan) Nozomi Okuhara	9	5	4	+1
(Japan) Akane Yamaguchi	6	3	3	0
(South Korea) Bae Yeon-ju	2	2	0	+2
(South Korea) Sung Ji-hyun	6	2	4	–2
(Spain) Carolina Marín	5	3	2	+1
(Thailand) Porntip Buranaprasertsuk	2	2	0	+2
(Thailand) Ratchanok Intanon	7	2	5	–3
