= Slovak Open (badminton) =

Badminton championships held in Slovakia

The Slovak Open in badminton is an international open held in Slovakia since 1993. The tournament followed the Czechoslovakian Open, and it belongs to the European Badminton Circuit.

== Previous winners ==
Year	Men's singles	Women's singles	Men's doubles	Women's doubles	Mixed doubles	Ref
1993	(Hungary) Richárd Bánhidi	(Hungary) Andrea Harsági	(Slovakia) Juraj Brestovský (Slovakia) Peter Púdela	(Hungary) Adrienn Kocsis (Hungary) Andrea Ódor	(Hungary) Richárd Bánhidi (Hungary) Adrienn Kocsis	
1994	(Ukraine) Vladislav Druzchenko	(Ukraine) Elena Nozdran	(Ukraine) Valerj Strelcov (Ukraine) Alexandr Tzygankov	(Ukraine) Victoria Evtoushenko (Ukraine) Elena Nozdran	(Ukraine) Vladislav Druzchenko (Ukraine) Victoria Evtoushenko	
1995	(Ukraine) Vladislav Druzchenko	(Ukraine) Elena Nozdran	(Ukraine) Valeriy Strelcov (Ukraine) Konstantin Tatranov	(Ukraine) Victoria Evtoushenko (Ukraine) Elena Nozdran	(Ukraine) Vladislav Druzchenko (Ukraine) Victoria Evtoushenko	
1996	(Denmark) Gregers Schytt	(Denmark) Tanja Berg	(Austria) Harald Koch (Austria) Jürgen Koch	(Denmark) Rikke Broen (Denmark) Sara Runesten	(Slovenia) Andrej Pohar (Slovenia) Maja Pohar	
1997	(Denmark) Niels Christian Kaldau	(Denmark) Sarah Jønsson	(Austria) Harald Koch (Austria) Jürgen Koch	(England) Joanne Muggeridge (England) Felicity Gallup	(Denmark) Michael Lamp (Denmark) Rikke Broen	
1998	(Switzerland) Thomas Wapp	(Russia) Ella Karachkova	(England) Graham Hurrell (England) Peter Jeffrey	(England) Lorraine Cole (England) Tracy Dineen	(England) Anthony Clark (England) Lorraine Cole	
1999	Not held					
2000	(Poland) Przemysław Wacha	(England) Tracey Hallam	(Poland) Przemysław Wacha (Poland) Piotr Żołądek	(Poland) Kamila Augustyn (Belarus) Nadieżda Kostiuczyk	(Czech Republic) Ondřej Lubas (Czech Republic) Markéta Koudelková	
2001	(England) Colin Haughton	(Denmark) Tine Høy	(Denmark) Tommy Sørensen (Denmark) Jesper Thomsen	(Poland) Kamila Augustyn (Belarus) Nadieżda Kostiuczyk	(Denmark) Jesper Thomsen (Denmark) Julie Houmann	
2002	(Russia) Stanislav Pukhov	(Russia) Elena Sukhareva	(Russia) Stanislav Pukhov (Russia) Nikolai Zuyev	(China) Yuan Wemyss (Scotland) Kirsteen McEwan	(Belarus) Andrei Konakh (Belarus) Nadieżda Kostiuczyk	
2003	(Japan) Sho Sasaki	(Japan) Kaori Mori	(France) Vincent Laigle (France) Svetoslav Stoyanov	(Russia) Elena Shimko (Russia) Marina Yakusheva	(Russia) Alexandr Russkikh (Russia) Anastasia Russkikh	
2004	(Russia) Evgenij Isakov	(Italy) Hui Ding	(Russia) Sergey Ivlev (Russia) Nikolai Zuyev	(Malaysia) Chor Hooi Yee (Malaysia) Lim Pek Siah	(Russia) Nikolai Zuyev (Russia) Marina Yakusheva	
2005	(Poland) Przemysław Wacha	(Bulgaria) Petya Nedelcheva	(Austria) Jürgen Koch (Austria) Peter Zauner	(Poland) Kamila Augustyn (Poland) Nadieżda Kostiuczyk	(Czech Republic) Jan Fröhlich (Czech Republic) Hana Milisová	
2006	(Czech Republic) Jan Fröhlich	(Slovenia) Maja Tvrdy	(England) Chris Langridge (England) David Lindley	(England) Sarah Bok (England) Suzanne Rayappan	(England) David Lindley (England) Suzanne Rayappan	
2007	(Ukraine) Dmytro Zavadsky	(Denmark) Anne Hald Jensen	(Czech Republic) Jakub Bitman (Croatia) Zvonimir Đurkinjak	(Russia) Tatjana Bibik (Russia) Elena Shimko	(Russia) Anton Nazarenko (Russia) Elena Chernyavskaya	
2008	(Ukraine) Valeriy Atrashchenkov	(Ukraine) Elena Prus	(Iceland) Magnús Ingi Helgason (Iceland) Helgi Jóhannesson	(Republic of Ireland) Bing Huang (Republic of Ireland) Chloe Magee	(Ukraine) Valeriy Atrashchenkov (Ukraine) Elena Prus	
2009	(Italy) Wisnu Haryo Putro	(Belarus) Alesia Zaitsava	(Czech Republic) Ondřej Kopřiva (Czech Republic) Tomáš Kopřiva	(Denmark) Maria Lykke Andersen (Denmark) Karina Sørensen	(Denmark) Mark Philip Winther (Denmark) Karina Sørensen	
2010	(France) Alexandre Françoise	(Ukraine) Marija Ulitina	(Netherlands) Jacco Arends (Netherlands) Jelle Mass	(Netherlands) Selena Piek (Netherlands) Iris Tabeling	(Netherlands) Jacco Arends (Netherlands) Selena Piek	
2011	(Czech Republic) Petr Koukal	(Finland) Anu Nieminen	(Netherlands) Jorrit de Ruiter (Netherlands) Dave Khodabux	(Netherlands) Selena Piek (Netherlands) Iris Tabeling	(Netherlands) Dave Khodabux (Netherlands) Selena Piek	
2012	(Slovenia) Iztok Utroša	(Belarus) Alesia Zaitsava	(Wales) Joe Morgan (Wales) Nic Strange	(Ukraine) Yuliya Kazarinova (Ukraine) Yelyzaveta Zharka	(Czech Republic) Jakub Bitman (Czech Republic) Alžběta Bášová	
2013	(Ukraine) Vitaly Konov	(England) Panuga Riou	(Russia) Nikita Khakimov (Russia) Vasily Kuznetsov	(Ukraine) Anastasiya Dmytryshyn (Ukraine) Darya Samarchants	(Czech Republic) Jakub Bitman (Czech Republic) Alžběta Bášová	
2014	(Austria) Matthias Almer	(Poland) Anna Narel	(England) Ben Lane (England) Sean Vendy	(Croatia) Katarina Galenić (Netherlands) Cheryl Seinen	(Poland) Paweł Pietryja (Poland) Aneta Wojtkowska	
2015	(England) Alex Lane	(Czech Republic) Kristína Gavnholt	(Vietnam) Đỗ Tuấn Đức (Vietnam) Nguyễn Ngọc Mạnh	(Netherlands) Gayle Mahulette (Netherlands) Cheryl Seinen	(England) Ben Lane (England) Jessica Pugh	
2016	(Scotland) Matthew Carder	(Ukraine) Natalya Voytsekh	(Poland) Łukasz Moreń (Poland) Wojciech Szkudlarczyk	(Bulgaria) Mariya Mitsova (Bulgaria) Petya Nedelcheva	(Czech Republic) Jakub Bitman (Czech Republic) Alžběta Bášová	
2017	(Slovenia) Andraž Krapež	(Hungary) Laura Sárosi	(Ukraine) Ivan Druzchenko (Ukraine) Vladislav Druzchenko	(Czech Republic) Alžběta Bášová (Czech Republic) Michaela Fuchsová	(Poland) Paweł Śmiłowski (Poland) Magdalena Świerczyńska	
2018	(Indonesia) Andre Marteen	(Hong Kong) Joy Xuan Deng	(Chinese Taipei) Lu Chen (Chinese Taipei) Ye Hong-wei	(Chinese Taipei) Li Zi-qing (Chinese Taipei) Teng Chun-hsun	(Chinese Taipei) Ye Hong-wei (Chinese Taipei) Teng Chun-hsun	
2019	(Denmark) Kim Bruun	(Thailand) Porntip Buranaprasertsuk	(Thailand) Supak Jomkoh (Thailand) Wachirawit Sothon	(Estonia) Kati-Kreet Marran (Estonia) Helina Rüütel	(Thailand) Supak Jomkoh (Thailand) Supissara Paewsampran	
2020	(Czech Republic) Jan Louda	(Chinese Taipei) Lin Jhih-yun	(Chinese Taipei) Lin Shang-kai (Chinese Taipei) Tseng Min-hao	(Chinese Taipei) Lee Chia-hsin (Chinese Taipei) Lin Jhih-yun	(Chinese Taipei) Lu Ming-che (Chinese Taipei) Wu Ti-jung	
2021	Cancelled (Note: This tournament, originally to be played from 3 – 6 March, was later cancelled due to COVID-19 pandemic in Slovakia.)					
2022	(Japan) Riku Hatano	(India) Aditi Bhatt	(Malaysia) Boon Xin Yuan (Malaysia) Wong Tien Ci	(Chinese Taipei) Lee Chia-hsin (Chinese Taipei) Teng Chun-hsun	(Hong Kong) Yeung Ming Nok (Hong Kong) Yeung Pui Lam	
2023	No competition					
2024	(England) Ethan Rose	(India) Purva Barve	(Poland) Jakub Melaniuk (Poland) Wiktor Trecki	(Austria) Serena Au Yeong (Austria) Katharina Hochmeir	(Poland) Jakub Melaniuk (Poland) Julia Pławecka	
2025	(Belgium) Charles Fouyn	(India) Aalisha Naik	(Poland) Adrian Krawczyk (Poland) Szymon Ślepecki	(Malaysia) Low Zi Yu (Malaysia) Dania Sofea	(Serbia) Mihajlo Tomić (Serbia) Andjela Vitman	
2026	(Sweden) Azahbru Kasra	(Malaysia) Carine Tee	(Malaysia) Damien Ling (Malaysia) Irfan Shazmir	(Chinese Taipei) Chen Hsin-tung (Chinese Taipei) Chen Yu-hsi	(Chinese Taipei) Huang Tzu-yuan (Chinese Taipei) Kung Chia-yi	

== Performances by nation ==
As of the 2026 edition

Pos	Nation	MS	WS	MD	WD	XD	Total
1	Ukraine	5	5	3	4	3	20
2	England	3	2	3	3	3	14
3	Denmark	3	4	1	2	3	13
4	Poland	2	1	4	2	3	12
4	Russia	2	2	3	2	3	12
6	Czech Republic	3	1	1.5	1	5	11.5
7	Chinese Taipei		1	2	4	3	10
8	Netherlands			2	3.5	2	7.5
9	Austria	1		3	1		5
9	Hungary	1	2		1	1	5
9	Malaysia		1	2	2		5
12	Belarus		2		1	1	4
12	Slovenia	2	1			1	4
13	India		3				3
13	Japan	2	1				3
13	Thailand		1	1		1	3
17	Bulgaria		1		1		2
17	France	1		1			2
17	Hong Kong		1			1	2
17	Italy	1	1				2
21	Scotland	1			0.5		1.5
22	Belgium	1					1
22	Croatia			0.5	0.5		1
22	Estonia				1		1
22	Finland		1				1
22	Iceland			1			1
22	Indonesia	1					1
22	Ireland				1		1
22	Serbia					1	1
22	Slovakia			1			1
22	Sweden	1					1
22	Switzerland	1					1
22	Vietnam			1			1
22	Wales			1			1
35	China				0.5		0.5
Total		31	31	31	31	31	155
