= Mattias Borg =

Swedish badminton player (born 1991)

Personal information
- Born: 16 May 1991 (age 35)

Sport
- Country: Sweden
- Sport: Badminton

Men's singles
- Highest ranking: 88 (20 March 2014)
- BWF profile

Mattias Borg (born 16 May 1991) is a Swedish badminton player.

== Achievements ==
=== BWF International Challenge/Series ===
Men's singles
Year	Tournament	Opponent	Score	Result
2011	Iceland International	(Republic of Ireland) Tony Stephenson	21–18, 21–17	(gold) Winner
2013	Croatian International	(Italy) Wisnu Haryo Putro	21–19, 18–21, 23–25	(silver) Runner-up
2013	Kharkiv International	(Ukraine) Dmytro Zavadsky	14–21, 17–21	(silver) Runner-up
2014	USA International	(Sweden) Henri Hurskainen	16–21, 11–21	(silver) Runner-up
2016	Swedish Masters	(Denmark) Anders Antonsen	12–21, 10–21	(silver) Runner-up

BWF International Challenge tournament
BWF International Series tournament
BWF Future Series tournament
