= Matilda Petersen =

Swedish badminton player (born 1991)

Personal information
- Born: 17 February 1991 (age 35)

Sport
- Country: Sweden
- Sport: Badminton

Women's Singles
- Highest ranking: 88 (24 Jul 2014)
- BWF profile

Matilda Petersen (born 17 February 1991) is a Swedish female badminton player.

== Achievements ==
=== BWF International Challenge/Series ===
Women's Singles
Year	Tournament	Opponent	Score	Result
2014	Riga International	(Poland) Anna Narel	21–13, 21–15	(gold) Winner

BWF International Challenge tournament
BWF International Series tournament
BWF Future Series tournament
