= Yuliya Kazarinova =

Ukrainian badminton player (born 1992)

Personal information
- Born: Yuliya Romanivna Kazarinova; 2 January 1992 (age 34) Mykolaiv, Ukraine
- Height: 1.68 m (5 ft 6 in)
- Weight: 60 kg (132 lb)

Sport
- Country: Ukraine
- Sport: Badminton
- Coached by: Sergey Kosenchuk; Mihaylo Mizin

Women's singles & doubles
- Highest ranking: 181 (WS 6 November 2014); 84 (WD 27 September 2012); 61 (XD 10 September 2015)
- BWF profile
Medal record
Women's badminton
Representing Ukraine
European Junior Championships
| Bronze medal – third place | 2011 Vantaa | Mixed team |

Yuliya Romanivna Kazarinova (Ukrainian: Юлія Романівна Казарінова; born 2 January 1992) is a Ukrainian badminton player.

== Achievements ==
=== BWF International Challenge/Series (2 titles, 4 runners-up) ===
Women's doubles
| Year | Tournament | Partner | Opponent | Score | Result |
|---|---|---|---|---|---|
| 2018 | Belarus International | (Ukraine) Yevgeniya Paksyutova | (Russia) Olga Arkhangelskaya (Russia) Elizaveta Tarasova | 11–21, 13–21 | (silver) Runner-up |
| 2014 | Kharkiv International | (Ukraine) Mariya Rud | (Ukraine) Natalya Voytsekh (Ukraine) Yelyzaveta Zharka | 8–11, 7–11, 11–6, 7–11 | (silver) Runner-up |
| 2012 | Slovak Open | (Ukraine) Yelyzaveta Zharka | (Ukraine) Darya Samarchants (Ukraine) Anastasiya Dmytryshyn | 21–15, 20–22, 21–11 | (gold) Winner |

Mixed doubles
| Year | Tournament | Partner | Opponent | Score | Result |
|---|---|---|---|---|---|
| 2018 | Belarus International | (Ukraine) Ivan Druzchenko | (Poland) Robert Cybulski (Poland) Wiktoria Dąbczyńska | 21–15, 18–21, 20–22 | (silver) Runner-up |
| 2014 | Hatzor International | (Ukraine) Gennadiy Natarov | (France) Florent Riancho (Mauritius) Kate Foo Kune | 11–6, 11–7, 8–11, 11–10 | (gold) Winner |
| 2014 | Polish International | (Ukraine) Gennadiy Natarov | (Poland) Robert Mateusiak (Poland) Agnieszka Wojtkowska | 9–11, 7–11, 4–11 | (silver) Runner-up |

BWF International Challenge tournament
BWF International Series tournament
BWF Future Series tournament
