= Matthias Almer =

Austrian badminton player (born 1994)

Mathias Almer
Personal information
- Born: 8 January 1994 (age 32) Graz, Austria
- Height: 1.92 m (6 ft 4 in)

Sport
- Country: Austria
- Sport: Badminton
- Handedness: Right

Men's Single
- Highest ranking: 81 (20 Aug 2015)
- BWF profile
Medal record
Badminton
Representing Austria
European Junior Championships
Bronze medal – third place	2013 Ankara	Boys' singles

Matthias Almer (born 8 January 1994) is an Austrian male badminton player. In 2013, he won bronze medal at the European Junior Badminton Championships in boys' singles event.

== Achievements ==
=== European Junior Championships ===
Boys' Singles
Year	Venue	Opponent	Score	Result
2013	Aski Sports Hall; Ankara, Turkey	(Germany) Fabian Roth	21–13, 15–21, 17–21	Bronze

=== BWF International Challenge/Series ===
Men's singles
Year	Tournament	Opponent	Score	Result
2015	Iceland International	(Czech Republic) Milan Ludík	9-21, 19–21	(silver) Runner-up
2014	Turkey International	(Netherlands) Nick Fransman	21-15, 7-21, 21–17	(gold) Winner
2014	Slovak Open	(Netherlands) Justin Teeuwen	11–3, 11–9, 11–5	(gold) Winner

BWF International Challenge tournament
BWF International Series tournament
BWF Future Series tournament
