= Ayla Huser =

Swiss badminton player (born 1992)

Personal information
- Born: 27 May 1992 (age 34) Stans, Nidwalden, Switzerland
- Height: 1.68 m (5 ft 6 in)

Sport
- Country: Switzerland
- Sport: Badminton
- Handedness: Right

Women's singles & doubles
- Highest ranking: 94 (WS 22 March 2018); 72 (WD 9 October 2014); 145 (XD 30 August 2012)
- BWF profile

Ayla Huser (born 27 May 1992) is a Swiss badminton player and a member of Yverdon-les-Bains club. Born in Stans, Nidwalden, Switzerland, Huser spent her childhood in Buochs. She started paying badminton at the age of ten in Buochs badminton club, and after two years she moved to Stansstad club. In 2009, she won the Swiss national U17 championships in the singles and mixed event, and in 2011 she won the singles title at the Italian Junior tournament. In the 2011/2012 seasons, she joined the Swiss national badminton squad. Huser was the semifinalists at the 2016 Finnish and 2017 Dutch International tournament. In September 2017, she won her first international senior title at the Polish International.

== Achievements ==
=== BWF International Challenge/Series (2 titles) ===
Women's singles
Year	Tournament	Opponent	Score	Result
2017	Polish International	(Wales) Jordan Hart	21–19, 24–22	(gold) Winner
2019	Iceland International	(England) Abigail Holden	16–21, 24–22, 21–6	(gold) Winner

Commonwealth Youth Games tournament
BWF International Series tournament
BWF Future Series tournament
