= Anastasiya Dmytryshyn =

Ukrainian badminton player (born 1995)

Personal information
- Born: 22 August 1995 (age 31) Mykolaivka, Donetsk Oblast, Ukraine
- Height: 1.68 m (5 ft 6 in)

Sport
- Country: Ukraine
- Sport: Badminton
- Handedness: Right
- Coached by: Andriy Diptan; Sterin Mykhaylo

Women's singles & doubles
- Highest ranking: 252 (WS 7 November 2013); 76 (WD 17 April 2014); 106 (XD 27 March 2014)
- BWF profile

Anastasiya Volodymyrivna Dmytryshyn (Ukrainian: Анастасія Володимирівна Дмітрішин; born 22 August 1995) is a Ukrainian badminton player. She was the women's doubles champion at the 2013 Slovak Open partnered with Darya Samarchants.

== Achievements ==
=== BWF International Challenge/Series ===
Women's doubles
Year	Tournament	Partner	Opponent	Score	Result
2013	Slovak Open	(Ukraine) Darya Samarchants	(Czech Republic) Šárka Křížková (Czech Republic) Kateřina Tomalová	17–21, 22–20, 21–15	(gold) Winner
2012	Slovak Open	(Ukraine) Darya Samarchants	(Ukraine) Yuliya Kazarinova (Ukraine) Yelyzaveta Zharka	15–21, 22–20, 11–21	(silver) Runner-up

BWF International Challenge tournament
BWF International Series tournament
BWF Future Series tournament
