= Darya Samarchants =

Ukrainian badminton player (born 1995)

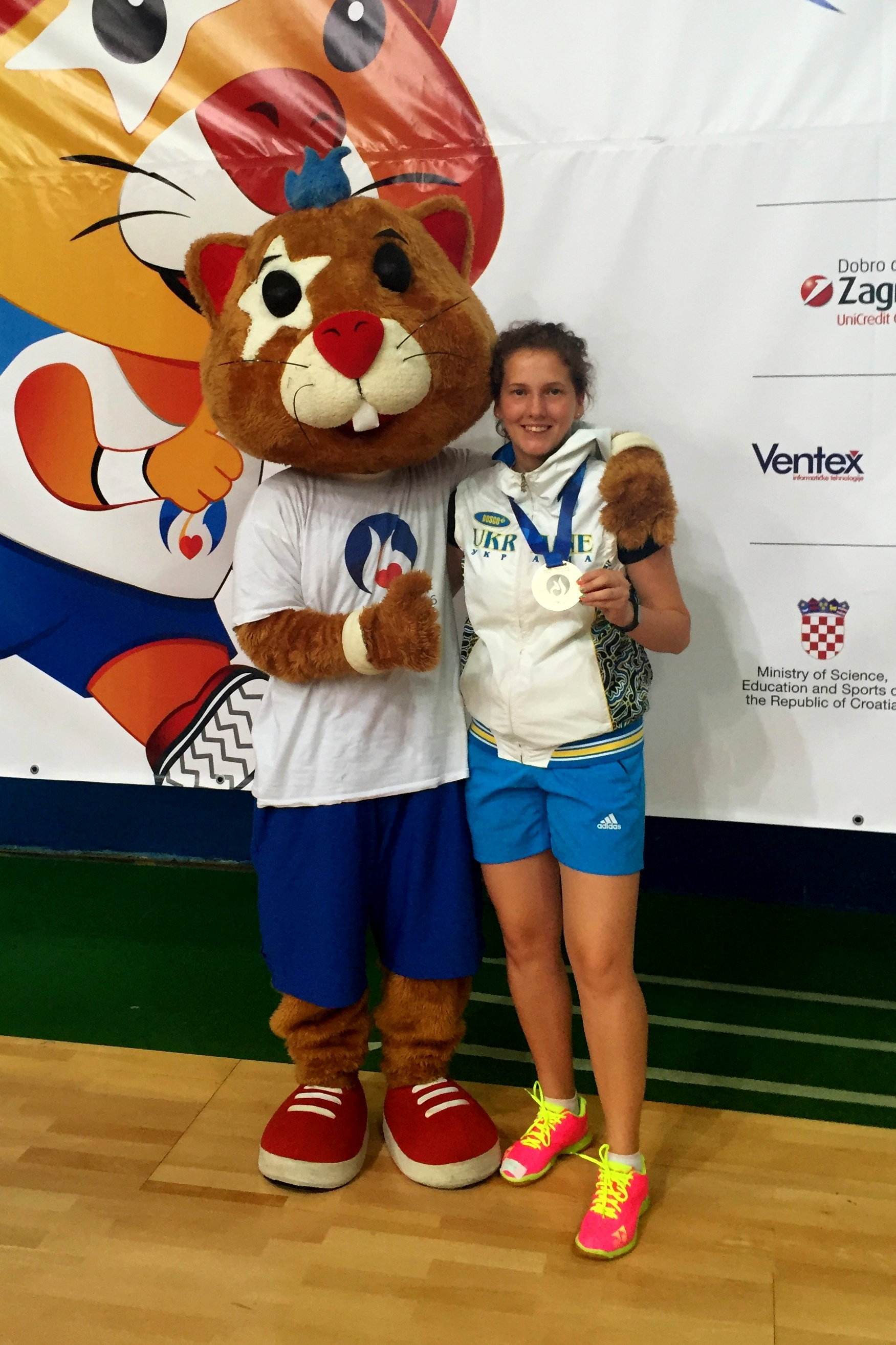
- Darya Samarchants

Personal information
- Born: 12 March 1995 (age 31) Kharkiv, Ukraine
- Height: 1.68 m (5 ft 6 in)

Sport
- Country: Ukraine
- Sport: Badminton
- Handedness: Right
- Coached by: Diptan Andriy; Sterin Mykhaylo

Women's singles & doubles
- Highest ranking: 234 (WS 13 March 2014; 76 (WD 17 April 2014); 167 (XD 17 April 2014)
- BWF profile

Darya Rubenovna Samarchants (Ukrainian: Дар’я Рубеновна Самарчанц; born 12 March 1995) is a Ukrainian badminton player. She was the women's doubles champion at the 2013 Slovak Open partnered with Anastasiya Dmytryshyn.

== Achievements ==
=== BWF International Challenge/Series ===
Women's doubles
Year	Tournament	Partner	Opponent	Score	Result
2016	Slovak Open	(Ukraine) Vladyslava Lesnaya	(Bulgaria) Mariya Mitsova (Bulgaria) Petya Nedelcheva	5–11, 4–11, 3–11	(silver) Runner-up
2013	Slovak Open	(Ukraine) Anastasiya Dmytryshyn	(Czech Republic) Šárka Křížková (Czech Republic) Kateřina Tomalová	17–21, 22–20, 21–15	(gold) Winner
2012	Slovak Open	(Ukraine) Anastasiya Dmytryshyn	(Ukraine) Yuliya Kazarinova (Ukraine) Yelyzaveta Zharka	15–21, 22–20, 11–21	(silver) Runner-up

BWF International Challenge tournament
BWF International Series tournament
BWF Future Series tournament
