= Kateřina Tomalová =

Czech badminton player

Personal information
- Born: 10 April 1992 (age 34) Ostrava, Czech Republic
- Height: 1.65 m (5 ft 5 in)
- Weight: 62 kg (137 lb)

Sport
- Country: Czech Republic
- Sport: Badminton
- Handedness: Right

Women's singles & doubles
- Highest ranking: 93 (WS 18 October 2022); 65 (WD with Tereza Švábíková 25 May 2017); 77 (XD with Jaromír Janáček 22 September 2016)
- BWF profile

Kateřina Tomalová (born 10 April 1992) is a Czech badminton player. Trained at the TJ Sokol Klimkovice, Tomalová made her international debut in 2004, and later joining the national team in 2007. She was a champion at the 2012 National Championships in the women's doubles. Tomalová entered the Badminton Europe Centre of Excellence (CoE) program in 2019. She competed at the 2015 and 2019 European Games.

== Achievements ==
=== BWF International Challenge/Series ===
Women's singles
Year	Tournament	Opponent	Score	Result
2018	Mauritius International	(Malaysia) Letshanaa Karupathevan	15–21, 10–21	(silver) Runner-up

Women's doubles
Year	Tournament	Partner	Opponent	Score	Result
2013	Slovak Open	(Czech Republic) Šárka Křížková	(Ukraine) Anastasiya Dmytryshyn (Ukraine) Darya Samarchants	21–17, 20–22, 15–21	(silver) Runner-up
2019	Carebaco International	(Czech Republic) Tereza Švábíková	(Barbados) Monyata Riviera (Barbados) Tamisha Williams	Walkover	(silver) Runner-up

BWF International Challenge tournament
BWF International Series tournament
BWF Future Series tournament
