= Yelyzaveta Zharka =

Ukrainian badminton player (born 1992)

Personal information
- Born: Yelyzaveta Yurievna Zharka; 14 June 1992 (age 34) Kharkiv, Ukraine
- Height: 1.72 m (5 ft 8 in)
- Weight: 75 kg (165 lb)

Sport
- Country: Ukraine
- Sport: Badminton
- Handedness: Right
- Coached by: Mykhaylo Sterin; Mikhail Mizin

Women's singles & doubles
- Highest ranking: 132 (WS 22 August 2013); 35 (WD 3 January 2023); 72 (XD 26 February 2019)
- BWF profile
Medal record
Women's badminton
Representing Ukraine
European Junior Championships
Bronze medal – third place	2011 Vantaa	Mixed team

Yelyzaveta Yurievna Zharka (Ukrainian: Єлизавета Юріївна Жарка; born 14 June 1992) is a Ukrainian badminton player. She competed at the 2010 Summer Youth Olympics, 2015 and 2019 European Games.

== Achievements ==
=== BWF International Challenge/Series (3 titles, 11 runners-up) ===
Women's doubles
Year	Tournament	Partner	Opponent	Score	Result
2012	Slovak Open	(Ukraine) Yuliya Kazarinova	(Ukraine) Darya Samarchants (Ukraine) Anastasiya Dmytryshyn	21–15, 20–22, 21–11	(gold) Winner
2013	Romanian International	(Ukraine) Natalya Voytsekh	(Russia) Irina Khlebko (Russia) Ksenia Polikarpova	18–21, 21–23	(silver) Runner-up
2013	Slovenia International	(Ukraine) Natalya Voytsekh	(Netherlands) Alida Chen (Netherlands) Soraya de Visch Eijbergen	21–11, 14–21, 14–21	(silver) Runner-up
2014	Kharkiv International	(Ukraine) Natalya Voytsekh	(Ukraine) Yuliya Kazarinova (Ukraine) Mariya Rud	11–8, 11–7, 6–11, 11–7	(gold) Winner
2016	Polish International	(Ukraine) Natalya Voytsekh	(India) Sanjana Santosh (India) Arathi Sara Sunil	21–19, 19–21, 14–21	(silver) Runner-up
2017	Czech International	(Ukraine) Maryna Ilyinskaya	(Estonia) Kristin Kuuba (Estonia) Helina Rüütel	13–21, 21–19, 21–16	(gold) Winner
2017	Turkey International	(Ukraine) Maryna Ilyinskaya	(Turkey) Bengisu Erçetin (Turkey) Nazlıcan İnci	13–21, 18–21	(silver) Runner-up
2018	Spanish International	(Ukraine) Maryna Ilyinskaya	(France) Delphine Delrue (France) Léa Palermo	6–21, 12–21	(silver) Runner-up
2021	Ukraine International	(Ukraine) Mariia Stoliarenko	(Germany) Stine Küspert (Germany) Emma Moszczyński	18–21, 21–19, 15–21	(silver) Runner-up
2022	Ukraine Open	(Ukraine) Mariia Stoliarenko	(Germany) Stine Küspert (Germany) Emma Moszczyński	18–21, 12–21	(silver) Runner-up

Mixed doubles
Year	Tournament	Partner	Opponent	Score	Result
2012	Slovak Open	(Ukraine) Vitaly Konov	(Czech Republic) Jakub Bitman (Czech Republic) Alžběta Bášová	21–12, 17–21, 19–21	(silver) Runner-up
2013	Slovak Open	(Ukraine) Mykola Dmitrishin	(Czech Republic) Jakub Bitman (Czech Republic) Alžběta Bášová	16–21, 20–22	(silver) Runner-up
2014	Kharkiv International	(Ukraine) Valeriy Atrashchenkov	(Ukraine) Artem Pochtarov (Ukraine) Elena Prus	11–10, 7–11, 10–11, 6–11	(silver) Runner-up
2017	Turkey International	(Ukraine) Valeriy Atrashchenkov	(Germany) Peter Käsbauer (Germany) Olga Konon	18–21, 20–22	(silver) Runner-up

BWF International Challenge tournament
BWF International Series tournament
BWF Future Series tournament
