= Zuzana Pavelková =

Czech badminton player (born 1992)

Personal information
- Born: 16 March 1992 (age 34) Přerov, Czech Republic
- Height: 1.63 m (5 ft 4 in)
- Weight: 54 kg (119 lb)

Sport
- Country: Czech Republic
- Sport: Badminton
- Handedness: Right
- Coached by: Jiří Pavelka; Lennart Engler

Women's
- Highest ranking: 79 (WS) 18 Jun 2015; 136 (WD) 4 Apr 2013; 273 (XD) 26 Aug 2010
- BWF profile

Zuzana Pavelková (born 16 March 1992) is a Czech female badminton player.

== Achievements ==
=== BWF International Challenge/Series ===
Women's singles

Year	Tournament	Opponent	Score	Result
2015	Hatzor International	(England) Lydia Jane Powell	21–18, 21–14	(gold) Winner
2015	Jamaica International	(Turkey) Ebru Tunali	21–18, 10–21, 17–21	(silver) Runner-up

BWF International Challenge tournament
BWF International Series tournament
BWF Future Series tournament
