= 2014 China Masters Grand Prix Gold =

Tournament details
- Dates: April 15, 2014 - April 20, 2014
- Total prize money: US$120,000
- Venue: Olympic Sports Center Xincheng Gymnasium
- Location: Changzhou, China

Champions
- Men's singles: (China) Lin Dan
- Women's singles: (China) Liu Xin
- Men's doubles: (China) Kang Jun (China) Liu Cheng
- Women's doubles: (China) Luo Ying (China) Luo Yu
- Mixed doubles: (China) Lu Kai (China) Huang Yaqiong

The 2014 China Masters Grand Prix Gold was the sixth grand prix gold and grand prix tournament of the 2014 BWF Grand Prix Gold and Grand Prix. The tournament was held in Olympic Sports Center Xincheng Gymnasium, Changzhou, China April 15–20, 2014 and had a total purse of $120,000.

== Players by nation ==
| Nation | First round | Second round | Quarterfinals | Semifinals | Final |
|---|---|---|---|---|---|
| (China) | 4 | 9 | 2 | 5 | 5 |
| (Malaysia) | 8 | 6 | 2 | 1 | |
| (Thailand) | 3 | 2 | 2 | | |
| (Singapore) | 3 | 1 | 2 | 2 | |
| (Chinese Taipei) | 2 | 5 | 1 | | |
| (Hong Kong) | 2 | 1 | 1 | 1 | |
| (Canada) | 2 | | | | |
| (United States) | 2 | | | | |
| (Russia) | 1 | | | | |
| (Japan) | | | | 1 | |

== Representatives by nation ==
Top Nations
| Rank | Nation | MS | WS | MD | WD | XD | Total |
|---|---|---|---|---|---|---|---|
| 1 | China | 8 | 7 | 5 | 6 | 7 | 33 |
| 2 | Malaysia | 5 | 0 | 4 | 2 | 5 | 16 |
| 3 | Singapore | 3 | 2 | 2 | 2 | 3 | 12 |
| 4 | Chinese Taipei | 2 | 1 | 3 | 1 | 2 | 9 |
| 5 | Thailand | 5 | 0 | 1 | 1 | 0 | 7 |
| 6 | Hong Kong | 4 | 0 | 1 | 0 | 0 | 5 |
| 7 | Indonesia | 1 | 0 | 2 | 0 | 1 | 4 |
| 8 | Canada | 2 | 0 | 0 | 0 | 0 | 2 |
| 8 | United States | 1 | 1 | 0 | 0 | 0 | 2 |
| 10 | Japan | 0 | 0 | 0 | 1 | 0 | 1 |
| 10 | Russia | 0 | 1 | 0 | 0 | 0 | 1 |

== Men's singles ==
=== Seeds ===
1. (China) Wang Zhengming (semi-final)
2. (China) Tian Houwei (final)
3. (Hong Kong) Wei Nan (semi-final)
4. (Singapore) Derek Wong Zi Liang (quarter-final)
5. (Malaysia) Iskandar Zulkarnain Zainuddin (withdrew)
6. (Thailand) Suppanyu Avihingsanon (second round)
7. (Hong Kong) Chan Yan Kit (first round)
8. (United States) Howard Shu (first round)

=== Finals ===
Quarterfinals
1 | (China) Wang Zhengming | 21 | 21
(China) Liu Kai | 12 | 19
4 | (Singapore) Derek Wong Zi Liang | 16 | 15
(China) Lin Dan | 21 | 21
(Hong Kong) Ng Ka Long | 22 | 24
3 | (Hong Kong) Wei Nan | 24 | 26
(Thailand) Pannawit Thongnuam | 9 | 18
2 | (China) Tian Houwei | 21 | 21

Semifinals
1 | (China) Wang Zhengming | 19 | 12
(China) Lin Dan | 21 | 21
(Hong Kong) Wei Nan | 15 | 14
2 | (China) Tian Houwei | 21 | 21

Final
(China) Lin Dan | 21 | 21
2 | (China) Tian Houwei | 14 | 9

=== Top half ===
==== Section 1 ====
First Round
1 | (China) Wang ZM | 21 | 9 | 21
(Singapore) Huang C | 9 | 21 | 18
(China) Huang YX | 21 | 21
(Canada) B Wynn-Morris | 10 | 10
7 | (Hong Kong) Chan YK | 14 | 21 | 19
(China) Liu K | 21 | 18 | 21
(China) Gao TY | 21 | 21
(Malaysia) Chong YH | 17 | 18

Second Round
1 | (China) Wang ZM | 13 | 21 | 21
(China) Huang YX | 21 | 14 | 14
(China) Liu K | 21 | 21
(China) Gao TY | 18 | 16

Quarter Final
1 | (China) Wang ZM | 21 | 21
(China) Liu K | 12 | 19

==== Section 2 ====
First Round
4 | (Singapore) D Wong | 21 | 21
(Hong Kong) Tam CH | 19 | 13
(Thailand) K Phetpradab | 21 | 12 | 21
(China) Liao JW | 18 | 21 | 19
5 | (Malaysia) I Zainuddin | wo
(Chinese Taipei) Hsu S-w
(Thailand) S Thammasin | 12 | 12
(China) Lin D | 21 | 21

Second Round
4 | (Singapore) D Wong | 18 | 21 | 21
(Thailand) K Phetpradab | 21 | 19 | 17
(Chinese Taipei) Hsu S-w | 11 | 8
(China) Lin D | 21 | 21

Quarter Final
4 | (Singapore) D Wong | 16 | 15
(China) Lin D | 21 | 21

=== Bottom half ===
==== Section 3 ====
First Round
(Hong Kong) Ng KL | 21 | 21
(Canada) T Chiu | 10 | 7
(Malaysia) Soong JV | 12 | 16
6 | (Thailand) S Avihingsanon | 21 | 21
(Thailand) P Boontan | 20 | 13
(Malaysia) N Ayub | 22 | 21
(Indonesia) K Akbar | 9 | 15
3 | (Hong Kong) Wei N | 21 | 21

Second Round
(Hong Kong) Ng KL | 21 | 21
6 | (Thailand) S Avihingsanon | 11 | 11
(Malaysia) N Ayub | 16 | 18
3 | (Hong Kong) Wei N | 21 | 21

Quarter Final
(Hong Kong) Ng KL | 22 | 24
3 | (Hong Kong) Wei N | 24 | 26

==== Section 4 ====
First Round
(Chinese Taipei) Yang C-h | 21 | 8 | 8
(Malaysia) Goh SH | 14 | 21 | 21
(Thailand) P Thongnuam | 21 | 15 | 21
8 | (United States) H Shu | 7 | 21 | 18
(China) Wu X | 21 | 23
(Malaysia) Soo TZ | 13 | 21
(Singapore) R Gonansa | 8 | 10
2 | (China) Tian HW | 21 | 21

Second Round
(Malaysia) Goh SH | 16 | 21 | 19
(Thailand) P Thongnuam | 21 | 18 | 21
(China) Wu X | 15 | 18
2 | (China) Tian HW | 21 | 21

Quarter Final
(Thailand) P Thongnuam | 9 | 18
2 | (China) Tian HW | 21 | 21

== Women's singles ==
=== Seeds ===
1. (Singapore) Gu Juan (quarter-final)
2. (China) Yao Xue (semi-final)

=== Finals ===
Semifinals
(China) Hui Xirui | 9 | 10
(China) Liu Xin | 21 | 21
(China) Shen Yaying | 21 | 21
2 | (China) Yao Xue | 19 | 19

Final
(China) Liu Xin | 21 | 21
(China) Shen Yaying | 12 | 18

=== Top half ===
First Round
1 | (Singapore) Gu J
BYE
(China) Hui XR | 21 | 21
(United States) I Wang | 3 | 13
(China) Chen XJ
BYE
(China) Liu X | 21 | 21
(Russia) A Astrakhantseva | 4 | 4

Quarter Final
1 | (Singapore) Gu J | 21 | 11
(China) Hui XR | 23 | 21
(China) Chen XJ | 3^{r}
(China) Liu X | 7

Semi Final
(China) Hui XR | 9 | 10
(China) Liu X | 21 | 21

=== Bottom half ===
First Round
(Chinese Taipei) Chen H-h | 22 | 21
(China) Fan MY | 20 | 15
BYE
(China) Shen YY
(China) Chen J | 21 | 18 | 15
(Singapore) Chen JY | 8 | 21 | 21
BYE
2 | (China) Yao X

Quarter Final
(Chinese Taipei) Chen H-h | 16 | 5
(China) Shen YY | 21 | 21
(Singapore) Chen JY | 13 | 7
2 | (China) Yao X | 21 | 21

Semi Final
(China) Shen YY | 19 | 19
2 | (China) Yao X | 21 | 21

== Men's doubles ==
=== Seeds ===
1. (China) Kang Jun / Liu Cheng (champion)
2. (Thailand) Wannawat Ampunsuwan / Patiphat Chalardchaleam (quarter-final)
3. (China) Li Junhui / Liu Yuchen (quarter-final)
4. (Indonesia) Christopher Rusdianto / Trikusuma Wardhana (second round)

=== Finals ===
Semifinals
1 | (China) Kang Jun (China) Liu Cheng | 21 | 21
(Singapore) Danny Bawa Chrisnanta (Singapore) Chayut Triyachart | 17 | 17
(China) Cai Yun (China) Lu Kai | 19 | 19
(China) Wang Yilu (China) Zhang Wen | 21 | 21

Final
1 | (China) Kang Jun (China) Liu Cheng | 21 | 21
(China) Wang Yilu (China) Zhang Wen | 13 | 16

=== Top half ===
==== Section 1 ====
First Round
1 | (China) Kang J (China) Liu C
BYE
(Chinese Taipei) Liu W-c (Chinese Taipei) Yang P-h
BYE
(China) Chen ZF (China) Shi LF
BYE
(Malaysia) Tan CT (Malaysia) Wong FY
BYE

Second Round
1 | (China) Kang J (China) Liu C | 21 | 17 | 21
(Chinese Taipei) Liu W-c (Chinese Taipei) Yang P-h | 18 | 21 | 13
(China) Chen ZF (China) Shi LF | 18 | 21 | 21
(Malaysia) Tan CT (Malaysia) Wong FY | 21 | 15 | 17

Quarterfinals
1 | (China) Kang J (China) Liu C | 21 | 21
(China) Chen ZF (China) Shi LF | 14 | 9

==== Section 2 ====
First Round
4 | (Indonesia) C Rusdianto (Indonesia) T Wardhana
BYE
(Malaysia) Tai AK (Malaysia) Woon MC
BYE
(Chinese Taipei) Liao M-c (Chinese Taipei) Tseng M-h
BYE
(Malaysia) Chan PS (Malaysia) Ong JG | wo
(Singapore) D Chrisnanta (Singapore) C Triyachart

Second Round
4 | (Indonesia) C Rusdianto (Indonesia) T Wardhana | 17 | 21 | 19
(Malaysia) Tai AK (Malaysia) Woon MC | 21 | 14 | 21
(Chinese Taipei) Liao M-c (Chinese Taipei) Tseng M-h | 18 | 18
(Singapore) D Chrisnanta (Singapore) C Triyachart | 21 | 21

Quarterfinals
(Malaysia) Tai AK (Malaysia) Woon MC | 10 | 17
(Singapore) D Chrisnanta (Singapore) C Triyachart | 21 | 21

=== Bottom half ===
==== Section 3 ====
First Round
(China) Cai Y (China) Lu K | 21 | 21
(Chinese Taipei) Chang K-l (Chinese Taipei) Su Y-n | 11 | 9
BYE
(Malaysia) Chooi KM (Malaysia) Teo EY
BYE
(Hong Kong) F Kurniawan (Hong Kong) Lo LK
BYE
3 | (China) Li JH (China) Liu YC

Second Round
(China) Cai Y (China) Lu K | 21 | 21
(Malaysia) Chooi KM (Malaysia) Teo EY | 16 | 17
(Hong Kong) F Kurniawan (Hong Kong) Lo LK | 21 | 12 | 16
3 | (China) Li JH (China) Liu YC | 14 | 21 | 21

Quarterfinals
(China) Cai Y (China) Lu K | 21 | 21
3 | (China) Li JH (China) Liu YC | 19 | 16

==== Section 4 ====
First Round
BYE
(Indonesia) A Adistia (Indonesia) H Gunawan
BYE
(China) Wang YL (China) Zhang W
BYE
(Singapore) T Hee (Singapore) Loh KH
BYE
2 | (Thailand) W Ampunsuwan (Thailand) P Chalardchaleam

Second Round
(Indonesia) A Adistia (Indonesia) H Gunawan | 12 | 17
(China) Wang YL (China) Zhang W | 21 | 21
(Singapore) T Hee (Singapore) Loh KH | 19 | 8
2 | (Thailand) W Ampunsuwan (Thailand) P Chalardchaleam | 21 | 21

Quarterfinals
(China) Wang YL (China) Zhang W | 21 | 21
2 | (Thailand) W Ampunsuwan (Thailand) P Chalardchaleam | 15 | 14

== Women's doubles ==
=== Seeds ===
1. (China) Luo Ying / Luo Yu (champion)
2. (Singapore) Shinta Mulia Sari / Yao Lei (semi-final)

=== Finals ===
Semifinals
1 | (China) Luo Ying (China) Luo Yu | 21 | 21
(Japan) Ayane Kurihara (Japan) Naru Shinoya | 13 | 11
(China) Huang Yaqiong (China) Yu Xiaohan | 21 | 21
2 | (Singapore) Shinta Mulia Sari (Singapore) Yao Lei | 13 | 7

Final
1 | (China) Luo Ying (China) Luo Yu | 21 | 21
(China) Huang Yaqiong (China) Yu Xiaohan | 17 | 19

=== Top half ===
First Round
1 | (China) Luo Y (China) Luo Y
BYE
(Malaysia) Lee MY (Malaysia) Lim YL | 9 | 16
(China) Ou DN (China) Xiong MJ | 21 | 21
(Japan) A Kurihara (Japan) N Shinoya
BYE
(China) Xia H (China) Zhong QX | 21 | 21
(Singapore) Fu MT (Singapore) V Neo | 11 | 10

Quarter Final
1 | (China) Luo Y (China) Luo Y | 21 | 21
(China) Ou DN (China) Xiong MJ | 14 | 19
(Japan) A Kurihara (Japan) N Shinoya | 21 | 21
(China) Xia H (China) Zhong QX | 17 | 17

Semi Final
1 | (China) Luo Y (China) Luo Y | 21 | 21
(Japan) A Kurihara (Japan) N Shinoya | 13 | 11

=== Bottom half ===
First Round
(Thailand) J Kittiharakul (Thailand) R Prajongjai | 2^{d}
(China) Huang DP (China) Xu Y | 0
(China) Huang YQ (China) Yu XH | 21 | 21
(Malaysia) Chow MK (Malaysia) Lai SJ | 8 | 14
(Chinese Taipei) Chen H-h (Chinese Taipei) Lai C-w | 21 | 21
(China) Du P (China) Zhu MC | 17 | 4
BYE
2 | (Singapore) S Sari (Singapore) Yao L

Quarter Final
(China) Huang DP (China) Xu Y | 13 | 21 | 14
(China) Huang YQ (China) Yu XH | 21 | 17 | 21
(Chinese Taipei) Chen H-h (Chinese Taipei) Lai C-w | 15 | 16
2 | (Singapore) S Sari (Singapore) Yao L | 21 | 21

Semi Final
(China) Huang YQ (China) Yu XH | 21 | 21
2 | (Singapore) S Sari (Singapore) Yao L | 13 | 7

== Mixed doubles ==
=== Seeds ===
1. (Singapore) Danny Bawa Chrisnanta / Vanessa Neo Yu Yan (second round)
2. (Chinese Taipei) Liao Min-chun / Chen Hsiao-huan (second round)
3. (China) Lu Kai / Huang Yaqiong (champion)
4. (Indonesia) Praveen Jordan / Debby Susanto (quarter-final)

=== Finals ===
Semifinals
(Malaysia) Tan Aik Quan (Malaysia) Lim Yin Loo | 15 | 21 | 12
3 | (China) Lu Kai (China) Huang Yaqiong | 21 | 17 | 21
(China) Wang Yilu (China) Xia Huan | 21 | 21
(China) Liu Yuchen (China) Luo Ying | 14 | 17

Final
3 | (China) Lu Kai (China) Huang Yaqiong | 21 | 21
(China) Wang Yilu (China) Xia Huan | 12 | 14

=== Top half ===
==== Section 1 ====
First Round
1 | (Singapore) D Chrisnanta (Singapore) V Neo
BYE
(China) Li JH (China) Huang DP
BYE
(Malaysia) Tan AQ (Malaysia) Lim YL
BYE
(Malaysia) Tan CT (Malaysia) Lai SJ
BYE

Second Round
1 | (Singapore) D Chrisnanta (Singapore) V Neo | 17 | 21 | 19
(China) Li JH (China) Huang DP | 21 | 19 | 21
(Malaysia) Tan AQ (Malaysia) Lim YL | 21 | 12 | 21
(Malaysia) Tan CT (Malaysia) Lai SJ | 14 | 21 | 9

Quarterfinals
(China) Li JH (China) Huang DP | 17 | 9
(Malaysia) Tan AQ (Malaysia) Lim YL | 21 | 21

==== Section 2 ====
First Round
3 | (China) Lu K (China) Huang YQ
BYE
(China) Zhang W (China) Ou DN
BYE
(China) Shi LF (China) Du P
BYE
(Singapore) C Triyachart (Singapore) Yao L | 21 | 21
(Chinese Taipei) Tseng M-h (Chinese Taipei) Lai C-w | 14 | 18

Second Round
3 | (China) Lu K (China) Huang YQ | 21 | 21
(China) Zhang W (China) Ou DN | 13 | 11
(China) Shi LF (China) Du P | 14 | 13
(Singapore) C Triyachart (Singapore) Yao L | 21 | 21

Quarterfinals
3 | (China) Lu K (China) Huang Yaqiong | 21 | 21
(Singapore) C Triyachart (Singapore) Yao L | 15 | 16

=== Bottom half ===
==== Section 3 ====
First Round
(Malaysia) Chan PS (Malaysia) Lai PJ | wo
(China) Chen ZF (China) Xiong MJ
BYE
(China) Wang YL (China) Xia H
BYE
(Malaysia) Wong FY (Malaysia) Chow MK
BYE
4 | (Indonesia) P Jordan (Indonesia) D Susanto

Second Round
(China) Chen ZF (China) Xiong MJ | 12 | 11
(China) Wang YL (China) Xia H | 21 | 21
(Malaysia) Wong FY (Malaysia) Chow MK | 21 | 20 | 12
4 | (Indonesia) P Jordan (Indonesia) D Susanto | 19 | 22 | 21

Quarterfinals
(China) Wang YL (China) Xia H | 21 | 22
4 | (Indonesia) P Jordan (Indonesia) D Susanto | 11 | 20

==== Section 4 ====
First Round
BYE
(China) Liu YC (China) Luo Y
BYE
(Singapore) T Hee (Singapore) Fu MT
BYE
(Malaysia) Ong JG (Malaysia) Lee MY
BYE
2 | (Chinese Taipei) Liao M-c (Chinese Taipei) Chen H-h

Second Round
(China) Liu YC (China) Luo Y | 18 | 21 | 21
(Singapore) T Hee (Singapore) Fu MT | 21 | 7 | 14
(Malaysia) Ong JG (Malaysia) Lee MY | 21 | 21
2 | (Chinese Taipei) Liao M-c (Chinese Taipei) Chen H-h | 14 | 15

Quarterfinals
(China) Liu YC (China) Luo Y | 21 | 21
(Malaysia) Ong JG (Malaysia) Lee MY | 14 | 15

| Preceded by 2014 New Zealand Open Grand Prix | BWF Grand Prix Gold and Grand Prix; 2014 season | Succeeded by 2014 Canada Open Grand Prix |
