= Zhang Wen (badminton) =

Chinese badminton player (born 1992)

Zhang Wen 张稳
Personal information
- Born: 25 September 1992 (age 34) Hunan, China
- Height: 1.77 m (5 ft 10 in)

Sport
- Country: China
- Sport: Badminton

Men's & mixed doubles
- Highest ranking: 15 (MD with Wang Yilyu 16 April 2015); 97 (XD with Jia Yifan 1 September 2016)
- BWF profile
Medal record
Men's badminton
Representing China
Asia Championships
Bronze medal – third place	2014 Gimcheon	Mixed doubles
Summer Universiade
Silver medal – second place	2015 Gwangju	Men's doubles
Silver medal – second place	2015 Gwangju	Mixed team

Zhang Wen (Chinese: 张稳; pinyin: Zhāng Wěn; born 25 September 1992) is a Chinese badminton player. In 2014, he won the Grand Prix Gold title at the Bitburger Open tournament in the men's doubles event partnered with Wang Yilyu. He and Wang also won the men's doubles title at the China International tournament back to back from 2014 to 2016.

== Achievements ==
=== Asian Championships ===
Mixed doubles
Year	Venue	Partner	Opponent	Score	Result
2014	Gimcheon Indoor Stadium, Gimcheon, South Korea	(China) Xia Huan	(Hong Kong) Lee Chun Hei (Hong Kong) Chau Hoi Wah	13–21, 15–21	Bronze

=== Summer Universiade ===
Men's doubles
Year	Venue	Partner	Opponent	Score	Result
2015	Hwasun Hanium Culture Sports Center; Hwasun, South Korea	(China) Wang Yilyu	(South Korea) Kim Gi-jung (South Korea) Kim Sa-rang	16–21, 20–22	Silver

=== BWF Grand Prix ===
The BWF Grand Prix had two levels, the Grand Prix and Grand Prix Gold. It was a series of badminton tournaments sanctioned by the Badminton World Federation (BWF) and played between 2007 and 2017.

Men's doubles
Year	Tournament	Partner	Opponent	Score	Result
2014	China Masters	(China) Wang Yilyu	(China) Kang Jun (China) Liu Cheng	13–21, 16–21	(silver) Runner-up
2014	Bitburger Open	(China) Wang Yilyu	(Denmark) Kim Astrup (Denmark) Anders Skaarup Rasmussen	21–14, 21–10	(gold) Winner
2015	China Masters	(China) Wang Yilyu	(China) Li Junhui (China) Liu Yuchen	15–21, 21–19, 12–21	(silver) Runner-up
2015	Brasil Open	(China) Wang Yilyu	(China) Huang Kaixiang (China) Zheng Siwei	24–22, 10–21, 14–21	(silver) Runner-up

BWF Grand Prix Gold tournament
BWF Grand Prix tournament

=== BWF International Challenge/Series ===
Men's doubles
Year	Tournament	Partner	Opponent	Score	Result
2014	China International	(China) Wang Yilyu	(Chinese Taipei) Liao Chi-hung (Chinese Taipei) Liao I-liang	21–14, 21–12	(gold) Winner
2015	China International	(China) Wang Yilyu	(China) Li Junhui (China) Liu Yuchen	21–10, 22–20	(gold) Winner
2016	China International	(China) Wang Yilyu	(China) Wang Sijie (China) Zhu Junhao	21–9, 21–15	(gold) Winner

Mixed doubles
Year	Tournament	Partner	Opponent	Score	Result
2014	China International	(China) Xia Huan	(China) Wang Yilyu (China) Ou Dongni	18–21, 21–15, 19–21	(silver) Runner-up

BWF International Challenge tournament
BWF International Series tournament
