= 2015 China Masters Grand Prix Gold =

Tournament details
- Dates: 14 April 2015 – 19 April 2015
- Level: Grand Prix Gold
- Total prize money: US$250,000
- Venue: Olympic Sports Center Xincheng Gymnasium
- Location: Changzhou, Jiangsu, China

Champions
- Men's singles: (China) Wang Zhengming
- Women's singles: (China) He Bingjiao
- Men's doubles: (China) Li Junhui (China) Liu Yuchen
- Women's doubles: (China) Tang Jinhua (China) Zhong Qianxin
- Mixed doubles: (China) Liu Cheng (China) Bao Yixin

The 2015 China Masters Grand Prix Gold was the fifth grand prix and grand prix gold tournament of the 2015 BWF Grand Prix and Grand Prix Gold. The tournament was held at the Olympic Sports Center Xincheng Gymnasium in Changzhou, Jiangsu, China on April 14–19, 2015 and had a total purse of $250,000.

== Men's singles ==
=== Seeds ===
1. (China) Wang Zhengming (champion)
2. (China) Tian Houwei (semi-final)
3. (Hong Kong) Wei Nan (semi-final)
4. (Singapore) Derek Wong Zi Liang (quarter-final)
5. (China) Xue Song (third round)
6. (Thailand) Suppanyu Avihingsanon (second round)
7. (Russia) Vladimir Malkov (second round)
8. (United States) Howard Shu (second round)

=== Finals ===
Quarterfinals
1	(China) Wang Zhengming	19	21	21
(China) Zhao Junpeng	21	11	15
3	(Hong Kong) Wei Nan	15	21	21
(China) Lin Guipu	21	9	18
(China) Huang Yuxiang	11	21	21
4	(Singapore) Derek Wong Zi Liang	21	19	18
(Chinese Taipei) Kuo Po-cheng	7	6
2	(China) Tian Houwei	21	21

Semifinals
1	(China) Wang Zhengming	21	21
3	(Hong Kong) Wei Nan	12	12
(China) Huang Yuxiang	21	21
2	(China) Tian Houwei	15	11

Final
1	(China) Wang Zhengming	22	21
(China) Huang Yuxiang	20	19

=== Top half ===
==== Section 1 ====
First Round
1	(China) Wang ZM
BYE
(China) Qiao B
BYE
(Scotland) A Casey
BYE
(Canada) T Chiu
BYE

Second Round
1	(China) Wang ZM	21	21
(China) Qiao B	17	13
(Scotland) A Casey	21	21
(Canada) T Chiu	18	16

Third Round
1	(China) Wang ZM	21	21
(Scotland) A Casey	13	14

==== Section 2 ====
First Round
7	(Russia) V Malkov
BYE
(China) Zhao JP
BYE
(Thailand) K Leelavechabutr
BYE
(Chinese Taipei) Shih K-c
BYE

Second Round
7	(Russia) V Malkov	18	7
(China) Zhao JP	21	21
(Thailand) K Leelavechabutr	9	21	21
(Chinese Taipei) Shih K-c	21	19	13

Third Round
(China) Zhao JP	21	21
(Thailand) K Leelavechabutr	16	13

==== Section 3 ====
First Round
3	(Hong Kong) Wei N
BYE
(Thailand) K Wangcharoen
BYE
(Thailand) S Thammasin
BYE
(Thailand) K Tantianankul
BYE

Second Round
3	(Hong Kong) Wei N	17	21	21
(Thailand) K Wangcharoen	21	14	12
(Thailand) S Thammasin
(Thailand) K Tantianankul	w	/	o

Third Round
3	(Hong Kong) Wei N	21	21
(Thailand) K Tantianankul	17	13

==== Section 4 ====
First Round
6	(Thailand) S Avihingsanon
BYE
(China) Lin GP
BYE
(Chinese Taipei) Cheng P-w
BYE
(Malaysia) M Hashim
BYE

Second Round
6	(Thailand) S Avihingsanon	18	15
(China) Lin GP	21	21
(Chinese Taipei) Cheng P-w	14	11
(Malaysia) M Hashim	21	21

Third Round
(China) Lin GP	15	22	21
(Malaysia) M Hashim	21	20	16

=== Bottom half ===
==== Section 5 ====
First Round
(China) Huang YX	21	21
(Hong Kong) Chan YK	10	10
BYE
(Chinese Taipei) Hsueh H-y
BYE
(Thailand) K Phetpradab
BYE
5	(China) Xue S

Second Round
(China) Huang YX	16	21	21
(Chinese Taipei) Hsueh H-y	21	16	17
(Thailand) K Phetpradab	16	17
5	(China) Xue S	21	21

Third Round
(China) Huang YX
5	(China) Xue S	wo

==== Section 6 ====
First Round
BYE
(Thailand) A Namkul
BYE
(China) Liao JW
BYE
(China) Zhu SY
BYE
4	(Singapore) D Wong

Second Round
(Thailand) A Namkul	18	16
(China) Liao JW	21	21
(China) Zhu SY	21	19	20
4	(Singapore) D Wong	12	21	22

Third Round
(China) Liao JW	21	15	9
4	(Singapore) D Wong	18	21	21

==== Section 7 ====
First Round
BYE
(China) Guo K
BYE
(Indonesia) S Kuncoro
BYE
(Chinese Taipei) Kuo P-c
BYE
8	(United States) H Shu

Second Round
(China) Guo K	21	21
(Indonesia) S Kuncoro	12	13
(Chinese Taipei) Kuo P-c	21	21	21
8	(United States) H Shu	12	23	11

Third Round
(China) Guo K	19	21	18
(Chinese Taipei) Kuo P-c	21	14	21

==== Section 8 ====
First Round
BYE
(Thailand) M Narongrit
BYE
(Chinese Taipei) Lin Y-h
BYE
(China) Zhou ZQ
BYE
2	(China) Tian HW

Second Round
(Thailand) M Narongrit	8	19
(Chinese Taipei) Lin Y-h	21	21
(China) Zhou ZQ	11	16
2	(China) Tian HW	21	21

Third Round
(Chinese Taipei) Lin Y-h	10	13
2	(China) Tian HW	21	21

== Women's singles ==
=== Seeds ===
1. (Canada) Michelle Li (withdrew)
2. (United States) Iris Wang (second round)
3. (China) Yao Xue (second round)
4. (Chinese Taipei) Hung Shih-han (second round)

=== Finals ===
Semifinals
(China) Hui Xirui	21	21
(Japan) Chisato Hoshi	7	18
(China) He Bingjiao	21	21
(China) Chen Yufei	13	10

Final
(China) Hui Xirui	13	9
(China) He Bingjiao	21	21

=== Top half ===
==== Section 1 ====
First Round
1	(Canada) M Li
BYE
(China) Hui XR
BYE
(China) Gao FJ
BYE
(China) Chen XX	21	21
(Australia) M Sun	8	6

Second Round
1	(Canada) M Li
(China) Hui XR	w	/	o
(China) Gao FJ	22	21	21
(China) Chen XX	24	18	19

Quarterfinals
(China) Hui XR	21	21
(China) Gao FJ	10	14

==== Section 2 ====
First Round
4	(Chinese Taipei) Hung S-h
BYE
(China) Fan MY	21	21
(Czech Republic) Z Pavelkova	12	11
(Japan) C Hoshi
BYE
(Thailand) S Katethong	11	21	21
(Chinese Taipei) Yu C-h	21	15	17

Second Round
4	(Chinese Taipei) Hung S-h	18	14
(China) Fan MY	21	21
(Japan) C Hoshi	21	21
(Thailand) S Katethong	13	14

Quarterfinals
(China) Fan MY	15	17
(Japan) C Hoshi	21	21

=== Bottom half ===
==== Section 3 ====
First Round
(Slovakia) J Ciznarova	6	4
(China) Zhang YM	21	21
BYE
(China) He BJ
(China) Shen YY	21	21
(Austria) S Prutsch	7	10
BYE
3	(China) Yao X

Second Round
(China) Zhang YM	10	1^{r}
(China) He BJ	21	6
(China) Shen YY	21	21
3	(China) Yao X	13	14

Quarterfinals
(China) He BJ	21	21
(China) Shen YY	10	17

==== Section 4 ====
First Round
(China) Li Y	21	18	21
(Chinese Taipei) Lee C-h	12	21	15
BYE
(Thailand) P Chochuwong
(China) Chen YF	21	21
(Chinese Taipei) Chiang M-h	16	15
BYE
2	(United States) I Wang

Second Round
(China) Li Y	18	22
(Thailand) P Chochuwong	21	24
(China) Chen YF	21	21
2	(United States) I Wang	14	14

Quarterfinals
(Thailand) P Chochuwong	11	15
(China) Chen YF	21	21

== Men's doubles ==
=== Seeds ===
1. (China) Liu Xiaolong / Qiu Zihan (second round)
2. (Singapore) Danny Bawa Chrisnanta / Chayut Triyachart (second round)
3. (China) Li Junhui / Liu Yuchen (champion)
4. (China) Wang Yilu / Zhang Wen (final)

=== Finals ===
Semifinals
(Chinese Taipei) Liao Min-chun (Chinese Taipei) Tseng Min-hao	7	13
4	(China) Wang Yilu (China) Zhang Wen	21	21
3	(China) Li Junhui (China) Liu Yuchen	17	21	21
(China) Kang Jun (China) Liu Cheng	21	17	13

Final
4	(China) Wang Yilu (China) Zhang Wen	15	21	12
3	(China) Li Junhui (China) Liu Yuchen	21	19	21

=== Top half ===
==== Section 1 ====
First Round
1	(China) Liu XL (China) Qiu ZH
BYE
(China) He JT (China) Zheng SW	21	19	19
(Chinese Taipei) Liao M-c (Chinese Taipei) Tseng M-h	12	21	21
(Malaysia) Hoon TH (Malaysia) Lim KW
BYE
(Singapore) T Hee (Singapore) H Wijaya	21	21
(Thailand) M Narongrit (Thailand) K Tantianankul	16	18

Second Round
1	(China) Liu XL (China) Qiu ZH	17	21
(Chinese Taipei) Liao M-c (Chinese Taipei) Tseng M-h	21	23
(Malaysia) Hoon TH (Malaysia) Lim KW	21	21
(Singapore) T Hee (Singapore) H Wijaya	19	11

Quarterfinals
(Chinese Taipei) Liao M-c (Chinese Taipei) Tseng M-h	21	21
(Malaysia) Hoon TH (Malaysia) Lim KW	16	18

==== Section 2 ====
First Round
4	(China) Wang YL (China) Zhang W
BYE
(Malaysia) Chooi KM (Malaysia) Ow YH	21	21
(Chinese Taipei) Liu W-c (Chinese Taipei) Yang P-h	18	17
(Netherlands) R Bosch (Chinese Taipei) Huang P-j
BYE
(Indonesia) A Pratama (Indonesia) R Suwardi	21	18	18
(Chinese Taipei) Lu C-y (Chinese Taipei) Tien T-c	17	21	21

Second Round
4	(China) Wang YL (China) Zhang W	21	21
(Malaysia) Chooi KM (Malaysia) Ow YH	10	16
(Netherlands) R Bosch (Chinese Taipei) Huang P-j	21	17	17
(Chinese Taipei) Lu C-y (Chinese Taipei) Tien T-c	14	21	21

Quarterfinals
4	(China) Wang YL (China) Zhang W	21	21
(Chinese Taipei) Lu C-y (Chinese Taipei) Tien T-c	14	11

=== Bottom half ===
==== Section 3 ====
First Round
(Malaysia) Tan WG (Malaysia) Teo EY	21	15	21
(Chinese Taipei) Chang K-c (Chinese Taipei) Wang C-l	16	21	17
(China) Huang KX (China) Yu XY	21	21
(Chinese Taipei) Cheng P-w (Chinese Taipei) Lin Y-h	10	13
(Indonesia) M F Gideon (Indonesia) K S Sukamuljo	17	21	17
(Chinese Taipei) Lin C-y (Chinese Taipei) Wu H-l	21	14	21
BYE
3	(China) Li JH (China) Liu YC

Second Round
(Malaysia) Tan WG (Malaysia) Teo EY	22	19
(China) Huang KX (China) Yu XY	24	21
(Chinese Taipei) Lin C-y (Chinese Taipei) Wu H-l	14	18
3	(China) Li JH (China) Liu YC	21	21

Quarterfinals
(China) Huang KX (China) Yu XY	16	21	16
3	(China) Li JH (China) Liu YC	21	12	21

==== Section 4 ====
First Round
(China) Kang J (China) Liu C	21	19	24
(Chinese Taipei) Liang J-w (Chinese Taipei) Lu C-p	12	21	22
BYE
(Thailand) K Ketlen (Thailand) D Puavaranukroh
(Japan) H Saeki (Japan) R Taohata	21	15	22
(Malaysia) Mak HC (Malaysia) Teo KS	17	21	20
BYE
2	(Singapore) D Chrisnanta (Singapore) C Triyachart

Second Round
(China) Kang J (China) Liu C	21	21
(Thailand) K Ketlen (Thailand) D Puavaranukroh	17	10
(Japan) H Saeki (Japan) R Taohata	17	21	21
2	(Singapore) D Chrisnanta (Singapore) C Triyachart	21	10	20

Quarterfinals
(China) Kang J (China) Liu C	21	21
(Japan) H Saeki (Japan) R Taohata	16	18

== Women's doubles ==
=== Seeds ===
1. (Malaysia) Vivian Hoo Kah Mun / Woon Khe Wei (semi-final)
2. (Malaysia) Lim Yin Loo / Lee Meng Yean (second round)
3. (China) Bao Yixin / Tang Yuanting (final)
4. (Chinese Taipei) Chen Hsiao-huan / Lai Chia-wen (quarter-final)

=== Finals ===
Semifinals
1	(Malaysia) Vivian Hoo Kah Mun (Malaysia) Woon Khe Wei	21	9
(China) Tang Jinhua (China) Zhong Qianxin	23	21
3	(China) Bao Yixin (China) Tang Yuanting	21	21
(China) Chen Qingchen (China) Jia Yifan	17	16

Final
(China) Tang Jinhua (China) Zhong Qianxin	21	11	21
3	(China) Bao Yixin (China) Tang Yuanting	14	21	17

=== Top half ===
==== Section 1 ====
First Round
1	(Malaysia) V Hoo (Malaysia) Woon KW
BYE
(China) Du Y (China) Li YH
BYE
(Japan) A Higashino (Japan) C Hoshi
BYE
(Thailand) S Katethong (Thailand) P Pransopon
BYE

Second Round
1	(Malaysia) V Hoo (Malaysia) Woon KW	18	21	21
(China) Du Y (China) Li YH	21	18	12
(Japan) A Higashino (Japan) C Hoshi	21	21
(Thailand) S Katethong (Thailand) P Pransopon	12	15

Quarterfinals
1	(Malaysia) V Hoo (Malaysia) Woon KW	21	21
(Japan) A Higashino (Japan) C Hoshi	15	11

==== Section 2 ====
First Round
4	(Chinese Taipei) Chen H-h (Chinese Taipei) Lai C-w
BYE
(China) Huang DP (China) Zhu MC
BYE
(Chinese Taipei) Chiang K-h (Chinese Taipei) Wu F-c
BYE
(Malaysia) Chin KM (Malaysia) Chow MK	15	13
(China) Tang JH (China) Zhong QX	21	21

Second Round
4	(Chinese Taipei) Chen H-h (Chinese Taipei) Lai C-w	21	21
(China) Huang DP (China) Zhu MC	13	10
(Chinese Taipei) Chiang K-h (Chinese Taipei) Wu F-c	13	10
(China) Tang JH (China) Zhong QX	21	21

Quarterfinals
4	(Chinese Taipei) Chen H-h (Chinese Taipei) Lai C-w	10	19
(China) Tang JH (China) Zhong QX	21	21

=== Bottom half ===
==== Section 3 ====
First Round
(Chinese Taipei) Chang C-h (Chinese Taipei) Chang H-t
(Thailand) P Chochuwong (Thailand) C Teachavorasinskun	wo
BYE
(Chinese Taipei) Hsieh P-c (Chinese Taipei) Wu T-j
BYE
(Indonesia) S Andini (Indonesia) M Giovani
BYE
3	(China) Bao YX (China) Tang YT

Second Round
(Chinese Taipei) Chang C-h (Chinese Taipei) Chang H-t	13	12
(Chinese Taipei) Hsieh P-c (Chinese Taipei) Wu T-j	21	21
(Indonesia) S Andini (Indonesia) M Giovani	4	9
3	(China) Bao YX (China) Tang YT	21	21

Quarterfinals
(Chinese Taipei) Hsieh P-c (Chinese Taipei) Wu T-j	11	12
3	(China) Bao YX (China) Tang YT	21	21

==== Section 4 ====
First Round
(Singapore) V Neo (Singapore) S Sari	15	12
(China) Chen QC (China) Jia YF	21	21
BYE
(Chinese Taipei) Cheng C-y (Chinese Taipei) Lee C-h
BYE
(Chinese Taipei) Cheng W-h (Chinese Taipei) Shaui P-l
BYE
2	(Malaysia) Lim YL (Malaysia) Lee MY

Second Round
(China) Chen QC (China) Jia YF	21	21
(Chinese Taipei) Cheng C-y (Chinese Taipei) Lee C-h	13	15
(Chinese Taipei) Cheng W-h (Chinese Taipei) Shaui P-l	23	21
2	(Malaysia) Lim YL (Malaysia) Lee MY	21	19

Quarterfinals
(China) Chen QC (China) Jia YF	21	21
(Chinese Taipei) Cheng W-h (Chinese Taipei) Shaui P-l	19	12

== Mixed doubles ==
=== Seeds ===
1. (China) Liu Cheng / Bao Yixin (champion)
2. (Singapore) Danny Bawa Chrisnanta / Vanessa Neo Yu Yan (second round)
3. (Indonesia) Edi Subaktiar / Gloria Emanuelle Widjaja (final)
4. (Indonesia) Ronald Alexander / Melati Daeva Oktaviani (second round)

=== Finals ===
Semifinals
1	(China) Liu Cheng (China) Bao Yixin	21	17	21
(Malaysia) Chan Peng Soon (Malaysia) Goh Liu Ying	17	21	17
3	(Indonesia) Edi Subaktiar (Indonesia) Gloria Emanuelle Widjaja	21	23
(China) Wang Yilu (China) Tang Yuanting	17	21

Final
1	(China) Liu Cheng (China) Bao Yixin	18	21	26
3	(Indonesia) Edi Subaktiar (Indonesia) Gloria Emanuelle Widjaja	21	15	24

=== Top half ===
==== Section 1 ====
First Round
1	(China) Liu C (China) Bao YX
BYE
(China) Yu XY (China) Zhu MC	18	11
(Chinese Taipei) Chang K-c (Chinese Taipei) Chang H-t	21	21
(Chinese Taipei) Tseng M-h (Chinese Taipei) Lai C-w	15	10
(Malaysia) Tan AQ (Malaysia) Lai PJ	21	21
(Chinese Taipei) Lu C-p (Chinese Taipei) Yu C-h	16	19
(Singapore) T Hee (Singapore) Tan WH	21	21

Second Round
1	(China) Liu C (China) Bao YX	21	21
(Chinese Taipei) Chang K-c (Chinese Taipei) Chang H-t	8	13
(Malaysia) Tan AQ (Malaysia) Lai PJ	21	21
(Singapore) T Hee (Singapore) Tan WH	14	17

Quarterfinals
1	(China) Liu C (China) Bao YX	21	21
(Malaysia) Tan AQ (Malaysia) Lai PJ	19	18

==== Section 2 ====
First Round
4	(Indonesia) R Alexander (Indonesia) M Oktaviani
BYE
(Singapore) C Triyachart (Singapore) S Sari	21	21
(Chinese Taipei) Huang P-j (Chinese Taipei) Shuai P-l	18	15
(Malaysia) Chan PS (Malaysia) Goh LY	21	21
(China) Li JH (China) Zhong QX	13	14
(Chinese Taipei) Lin C-y (Chinese Taipei) Wu T-j	16	16
(China) He JT (China) Du Y	21	21

Second Round
4	(Indonesia) R Alexander (Indonesia) M Oktaviani	21	24	16
(Singapore) C Triyachart (Singapore) S Sari	15	26	21
(Malaysia) Chan PS (Malaysia) Goh LY	21	21
(China) He JT (China) Du Y	15	13

Quarterfinals
(Singapore) C Triyachart (Singapore) S Sari	20	16
(Malaysia) Chan PS (Malaysia) Goh LY	22	21

=== Bottom half ===
==== Section 3 ====
First Round
(Thailand) K Leelavechabutr (Thailand) P Pransopon	16	10
(Chinese Taipei) Liao M-c (Chinese Taipei) Chen H-h	21	21
(Chinese Taipei) Wang C-l (Chinese Taipei) Cheng C-y	14	9
(China) Huang KX (China) Huang DP	21	21
(China) Zheng SW (China) Chen QC	21	21
(Malaysia) Wong FY (Malaysia) Chow MK	8	13
BYE
3	(Indonesia) E Subaktiar (Indonesia) G Widjaja

Second Round
(Chinese Taipei) Liao M-c (Chinese Taipei) Chen H-h	15	16
(China) Huang KX (China) Huang DP	21	21
(China) Zheng SW (China) Chen QC	17	19
3	(Indonesia) E Subaktiar (Indonesia) G Widjaja	21	21

Quarterfinals
(China) Huang KX (China) Huang DP	14	21	15
3	(Indonesia) E Subaktiar (Indonesia) G Widjaja	21	9	21

==== Section 4 ====
First Round
(Chinese Taipei) Lu C-y (Chinese Taipei) Cheng W-h	20	21
(Malaysia) Tan CT (Malaysia) Lai SJ	22	23
(Malaysia) Chooi KM (Malaysia) Lee MY	21	21
(Chinese Taipei) Wu H-l (Chinese Taipei) Hsieh P-c	19	19
(China) Wang YL (China) Tang YT	21	21
(Chinese Taipei) Liang J-w (Chinese Taipei) Lee C-h	8	15
BYE
2	(Singapore) D Chrisnanta (Singapore) V Neo

Second Round
(Malaysia) Tan CT (Malaysia) Lai SJ	17	21	21
(Malaysia) Chooi KM (Malaysia) Lee MY	21	16	16
(China) Wang YL (China) Tang YT	17	21	21
2	(Singapore) D Chrisnanta (Singapore) V Neo	21	18	16

Quarterfinals
(Malaysia) Tan CT (Malaysia) Lai SJ	11	13
(China) Wang YL (China) Tang YT	21	21

Preceded by 2015 Swiss Open Grand Prix Gold	BWF Grand Prix and Grand Prix Gold; 2015 BWF Season	Succeeded by 2015 New Zealand Open Grand Prix
