= Wang Yilyu =

Chinese badminton player (born 1994)

Wang Yilyu 王懿律
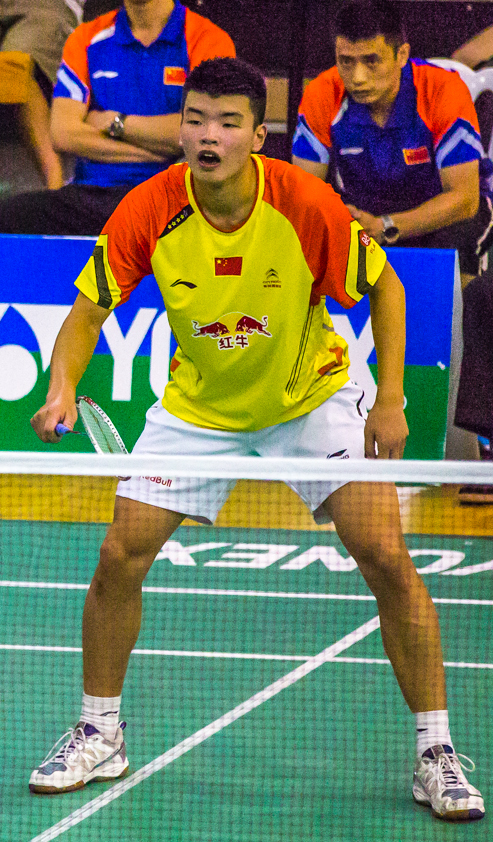

Personal information
- Born: 8 November 1994 (age 32) Jiaxing, Zhejiang, China
- Height: 1.85 m (6 ft 1 in)
- Weight: 70 kg (154 lb)

Sport
- Country: China
- Sport: Badminton
- Handedness: Right
- Retired: 1 June 2023

Men's & mixed doubles
- Highest ranking: 10 (MD with Huang Kaixiang, 15 June 2017); 1 (XD with Huang Dongping, 12 April 2018)
- BWF profile
Medal record
Men's badminton
Representing China
Olympic Games
Gold medal – first place	2020 Tokyo	Mixed doubles
World Championships
Silver medal – second place	2018 Nanjing	Mixed doubles
Bronze medal – third place	2019 Basel	Mixed doubles
Bronze medal – third place	2022 Tokyo	Mixed doubles
Sudirman Cup
Gold medal – first place	2019 Nanning	Mixed team
Gold medal – first place	2021 Vantaa	Mixed team
Thomas Cup
Gold medal – first place	2018 Bangkok	Men's team
Silver medal – second place	2020 Aarhus	Men's team
Asian Games
Gold medal – first place	2018 Jakarta–Palembang	Men's team
Bronze medal – third place	2018 Jakarta–Palembang	Mixed doubles
Asian Championships
Gold medal – first place	2018 Wuhan	Mixed doubles
Gold medal – first place	2019 Wuhan	Mixed doubles
Silver medal – second place	2017 Wuhan	Men's doubles
Silver medal – second place	2022 Manila	Mixed doubles
Bronze medal – third place	2017 Wuhan	Mixed doubles
Bronze medal – third place	2018 Wuhan	Men's doubles
Summer Universiade
Silver medal – second place	2015 Gwangju	Men's doubles
Silver medal – second place	2015 Gwangju	Mixed team
World Junior Championships
Gold medal – first place	2012 Chiba	Mixed team
Bronze medal – third place	2012 Chiba	Boys' doubles
Bronze medal – third place	2012 Chiba	Mixed doubles
Asian Junior Championships
Silver medal – second place	2012 Gimcheon	Mixed doubles
Silver medal – second place	2012 Gimcheon	Mixed team

Wang Yilyu (Chinese: 王懿律; pinyin: Wáng Yìlǜ; Mandarin pronunciation: [wǎŋ.î lŷ]; born 8 November 1994), sometimes also transliterated as Wang Yilu, Wang Yilv or Wang Yilü, is a Chinese badminton player. He is the mixed doubles Olympic champion at the 2020 Summer Olympics, and a two-time mixed doubles Asian Champion winning in 2018 and 2019. He was integrated into the Chinese squad that won the 2018 Thomas Cup as well at the 2019 and 2021 Sudirman Cup. Together with Huang Dongping, he reached a career high of world number 1 in the mixed doubles on 12 April 2018.

== Career ==
Wang was born in Jiaxing in 1994. He began badminton training at Youyi Primary School in Xiuzhou District in 2002. In 2003, he was transferred to Zhejiang Provincial Sports Vocational and Technical College for more professional and systematic badminton training. He has shown his talent since a young age, by winning the boys' doubles and team championships in the 2011 National Junior Championships.

Wang's journey began in the junior circuit, where he secured silver medals in both the mixed team and mixed doubles events at the 2012 Asian Junior Championships, followed by a gold medal in the mixed team and two bronze medals in the boys' and mixed doubles at the World Junior Championships. Transitioning to the senior level, he reached his first Grand Prix final at the 2013 U.S. Open and experienced a breakthrough 2014 season, winning double titles in the mixed and men's doubles at the China International. That same year, he captured his first Grand Prix title at the India Grand Prix Gold alongside Huang Yaqiong, clinched the men's doubles title at the Bitburger Open with Zhang Wen, and demonstrated his exceptional range by reaching the finals in two separate categories at the China Masters.

Wang competed at the 2015 Summer Universiade in Gwangju, when he was a student of the China University of Geosciences, Wuhan. At that tournament he secured silver medals in both the mixed team and men's doubles events, while also reaching Grand Prix finals at the China Masters and Brasil Open alongside Zhang Wen. This partnership with Zhang proved exceptionally consistent, as they clinched three consecutive China International titles from 2014 to 2016. Wang's prowess in mixed doubles also began to shine early on when he won the 2016 Swiss Open with Chen Qingchen. The year 2017 marked a defining moment; after winning the Thailand Masters and a silver medal at the Asian Championships with Huang Kaixiang, Wang experienced a career turning point upon partnering with Huang Dongping. This formidable duo quickly ascended the global rankings by capturing their first Superseries title at the Japan Open and winning the China Masters Grand Prix Gold, while also finishing as runners-up at the Korea Open and earning a bronze medal at the Asian Championships. By the end of this period, Wang had firmly established himself as a top-ten player.

Wang 2018 season began with dominance at the Asian Championships, where he captured the mixed doubles gold and a bronze in the men's doubles, followed by clinched the Thomas Cup title in May. His momentum carried into the summer, earning a silver medal at the World Championships in Nanjing, and a good performance at the Asian Games in Jakarta, where he secured team gold and a mixed doubles bronze. Throughout the BWF World Tour season, Wang showcased incredible resilience by reaching four major finals—in Malaysia, Japan, Fuzhou, and Hong Kong; while he narrowly missed the titles in those rounds, his consistency qualified him for the BWF World Tour Finals in Guangzhou. He ended the year on the highest possible note, finally breaking his runner-up streak by defeating his formidable compatriots, Zheng Siwei and Huang Yaqiong, in a thrilling rubber game to claim the year-end championship.

Wang with his partner Huang, kicked off the 2019 season with a victory at the India Open, followed quickly by a runner-up finish at the Malaysia Open, and a second consecutive Asian Championships gold. Wang helped secure the Sudirman Cup for China, then transitioned back to the individual circuit with Huang to win the Australian Open. The busy summer months saw them reach the finals of the Indonesia Open as a runner-up, before claiming the Japan and Thailand Open titles, and also a bronze medal at the World Championships. During the final stretch of the year, Wang and Huang remained a constant threat, finishing as runner-up at the China and Denmark Opens, and then capturing the Fuzhou China Open. He and his partner ending their prolific season as the runner-up at the BWF World Tour Finals.

Wang opened the 2020 season with elite-level consistency. Together with his partner Huang Dongping, they finishing as the runner-up at both the Malaysia and the Indonesia Masters. After the international circuit resumed following the COVID-19 pandemic, Wang reached the ultimate height of his profession at the 2020 Tokyo Olympics in July 2021, where Wang and Huang captured the gold medal in the mixed doubles final, beating their compatriots Zheng Siwei and Huang Yaqiong in a close rubber game. His success as a team player was equally remarkable in late 2021; he first helped China lift the 2021 Sudirman Cup trophy in Finland, before contributing to a silver medal finish at the 2020 Thomas Cup in Denmark.

Wang and Huang began 2022 with a strong performance as runners-up at the All England Open, followed shortly by a victory at the Korea Masters. They continued their momentum by earning a silver medal at the Asian Championships, and reaching the final of the Singapore Open to finish as runners-up. Later, the duo secured a bronze medal at the World Championships in Tokyo. In early 2023, he reached the final of the India Open, though he ultimately finished as a runner-up after being forced to withdraw from the title match because Wang suffered from a stomach infection. Throughout this period, Wang's career was increasingly hampered by a persistent and chronic waist (lower back) injury. This long-term physical struggle made it difficult for him to sustain the high-intensity training and recovery required for elite international badminton. In May 2023, Wang resigned from the Chinese national team as a result of a long-term injury. BWF announced his retirement on 1 June 2023.

== Achievements ==
=== Olympic Games ===
Mixed doubles
Year	Venue	Partner	Opponent	Score	Result
2020	Musashino Forest Sport Plaza, Tokyo, Japan	(China) Huang Dongping	(China) Zheng Siwei (China) Huang Yaqiong	21–17, 17–21, 21–19	Gold

=== BWF World Championships ===
Mixed doubles
Year	Venue	Partner	Opponent	Score	Result
2018	Nanjing Youth Olympic Sports Park, Nanjing, China	(China) Huang Dongping	(China) Zheng Siwei (China) Huang Yaqiong	17–21, 19–21	Silver
2019	St. Jakobshalle, Basel, Switzerland	(China) Huang Dongping	(Thailand) Dechapol Puavaranukroh (Thailand) Sapsiree Taerattanachai	16–21, 16–21	Bronze
2022	Tokyo Metropolitan Gymnasium, Tokyo, Japan	(China) Huang Dongping	(China) Zheng Siwei (China) Huang Yaqiong	16–21, 21–12, 10–21	Bronze

=== Asian Games ===
Mixed doubles
Year	Venue	Partner	Opponent	Score	Result
2018	Istora Gelora Bung Karno, Jakarta, Indonesia	(China) Huang Dongping	(Hong Kong) Tang Chun Man (Hong Kong) Tse Ying Suet	20–22, 21–19, 21–23	Bronze

=== Asian Championships ===
Men's doubles
Year	Venue	Partner	Opponent	Score	Result
2017	Wuhan Sports Center Gymnasium, Wuhan, China	(China) Huang Kaixiang	(China) Li Junhui (China) Liu Yuchen	14–21, 12–21	Silver
2018	Wuhan Sports Center Gymnasium, Wuhan, China	(China) Huang Kaixiang	(China) Li Junhui (China) Liu Yuchen	17–21, 21–14, 10–21	Bronze

Mixed doubles
Year	Venue	Partner	Opponent	Score	Result
2017	Wuhan Sports Center Gymnasium, Wuhan, China	(China) Huang Dongping	(Thailand) Dechapol Puavaranukroh (Thailand) Sapsiree Taerattanachai	19–21, 16–21	Bronze
2018	Wuhan Sports Center Gymnasium, Wuhan, China	(China) Huang Dongping	(Indonesia) Tontowi Ahmad (Indonesia) Liliyana Natsir	21–17, 21–17	Gold
2019	Wuhan Sports Center Gymnasium, Wuhan, China	(China) Huang Dongping	(China) He Jiting (China) Du Yue	21–11, 13–21, 23–21	Gold
2022	Muntinlupa Sports Complex, Metro Manila, Philippines	(China) Huang Dongping	(China) Zheng Siwei (China) Huang Yaqiong	17–21, 8–21	Silver

=== Summer Universiade ===
Men's doubles
Year	Venue	Partner	Opponent	Score	Result
2015	Hwasun Hanium Culture Sports Center, Hwasun, South Korea	(China) Zhang Wen	(South Korea) Kim Gi-jung (South Korea) Kim Sa-rang	16–21, 20–22	Silver

=== BWF World Junior Championships ===
Boys' doubles
Year	Venue	Partner	Opponent	Score	Result
2012	Chiba Port Arena, Chiba, Japan	(China) Liu Yuchen	(Hong Kong) Lee Chun Hei (Hong Kong) Ng Ka Long	10–21, 11–21	Bronze

Mixed doubles
Year	Venue	Partner	Opponent	Score	Result
2012	Chiba Port Arena, Chiba, Japan	(China) Huang Yaqiong	(Indonesia) Alfian Eko Prasetya (Indonesia) Shella Devi Aulia	21–12, 19–21, 12–21	Bronze

=== Asian Junior Championships ===
Mixed doubles
Year	Venue	Partner	Opponent	Score	Result
2012	Gimcheon Indoor Stadium, Gimcheon, South Korea	(China) Huang Dongping	(South Korea) Choi Sol-gyu (South Korea) Chae Yoo-jung	21–17, 23–25, 21–23	Silver

=== BWF World Tour (7 titles, 14 runners-up) ===
The BWF World Tour, which was announced on 19 March 2017 and implemented in 2018, is a series of elite badminton tournaments sanctioned by the Badminton World Federation (BWF). The BWF World Tour is divided into levels of World Tour Finals, Super 1000, Super 750, Super 500, Super 300 (part of the BWF World Tour), and the BWF Tour Super 100.

Mixed doubles
Year	Tournament	Level	Partner	Opponent	Score	Result
2018	Malaysia Open	Super 750	(China) Huang Dongping	(China) Zheng Siwei (China) Huang Yaqiong	19–21, 18–21	(silver) Runner-up
2018	Japan Open	Super 750	(China) Huang Dongping	(China) Zheng Siwei (China) Huang Yaqiong	19–21, 8–21	(silver) Runner-up
2018	Fuzhou China Open	Super 750	(China) Huang Dongping	(China) Zheng Siwei (China) Huang Yaqiong	15–21, 21–11, 19–21	(silver) Runner-up
2018	Hong Kong Open	Super 500	(China) Huang Dongping	(Japan) Yuta Watanabe (Japan) Arisa Higashino	18–21, 14–21	(silver) Runner-up
2018	BWF World Tour Finals	World Tour Finals	(China) Huang Dongping	(China) Zheng Siwei (China) Huang Yaqiong	23–21, 16–21, 21–18	(gold) Winner
2019	India Open	Super 500	(China) Huang Dongping	(Indonesia) Praveen Jordan (Indonesia) Melati Daeva Oktavianti	21–13, 21–11	(gold) Winner
2019	Malaysia Open	Super 750	(China) Huang Dongping	(China) Zheng Siwei (China) Huang Yaqiong	17–21, 13–21	(silver) Runner-up
2019	Australian Open	Super 300	(China) Huang Dongping	(Indonesia) Praveen Jordan (Indonesia) Melati Daeva Oktavianti	21–15, 21–8	(gold) Winner
2019	Indonesia Open	Super 1000	(China) Huang Dongping	(China) Zheng Siwei (China) Huang Yaqiong	13–21, 18–21	(silver) Runner-up
2019	Japan Open	Super 750	(China) Huang Dongping	(Indonesia) Praveen Jordan (Indonesia) Melati Daeva Oktavianti	21–17, 21–16	(gold) Winner
2019	Thailand Open	Super 500	(China) Huang Dongping	(Japan) Yuta Watanabe (Japan) Arisa Higashino	24–22, 23–21	(gold) Winner
2019	China Open	Super 1000	(China) Huang Dongping	(China) Zheng Siwei (China) Huang Yaqiong	17–21, 21–15, 16–21	(silver) Runner-up
2019	Denmark Open	Super 750	(China) Huang Dongping	(Indonesia) Praveen Jordan (Indonesia) Melati Daeva Oktavianti	18–21, 21–16, 19–21	(silver) Runner-up
2019	Fuzhou China Open	Super 750	(China) Huang Dongping	(China) Zheng Siwei (China) Huang Yaqiong	21–14, 21–13	(gold) Winner
2019	BWF World Tour Finals	World Tour Finals	(China) Huang Dongping	(China) Zheng Siwei (China) Huang Yaqiong	14–21, 14–21	(silver) Runner-up
2020	Malaysia Masters	Super 500	(China) Huang Dongping	(China) Zheng Siwei (China) Huang Yaqiong	19–21, 12–21	(silver) Runner-up
2020	Indonesia Masters	Super 500	(China) Huang Dongping	(China) Zheng Siwei (China) Huang Yaqiong	9–21, 9–21	(silver) Runner-up
2022	All England Open	Super 1000	(China) Huang Dongping	(Japan) Yuta Watanabe (Japan) Arisa Higashino	19–21, 19–21	(silver) Runner-up
2022	Korea Masters	Super 300	(China) Huang Dongping	(China) Ou Xuanyi (China) Huang Yaqiong	21–17, 21–17	(gold) Winner
2022	Singapore Open	Super 500	(China) Huang Dongping	(Thailand) Dechapol Puavaranukroh (Thailand) Sapsiree Taerattanachai	12–21, 17–21	(silver) Runner-up
2023	India Open	Super 750	(China) Huang Dongping	(Japan) Yuta Watanabe (Japan) Arisa Higashino	Walkover	(silver) Runner-up

=== BWF Superseries (1 title, 1 runner-up) ===
The BWF Superseries, which was launched on 14 December 2006 and implemented in 2007, was a series of elite badminton tournaments, sanctioned by the Badminton World Federation (BWF). BWF Superseries levels were Superseries and Superseries Premier. A season of Superseries consisted of twelve tournaments around the world that had been introduced since 2011. Successful players were invited to the Superseries Finals, which were held at the end of each year.

Mixed doubles
Year	Tournament	Partner	Opponent	Score	Result
2017	Korea Open	(China) Huang Dongping	(Indonesia) Praveen Jordan (Indonesia) Debby Susanto	17–21, 18–21	(silver) Runner-up
2017	Japan Open	(China) Huang Dongping	(Japan) Takuro Hoki (Japan) Sayaka Hirota	21–13, 21–8	(gold) Winner

BWF Super Series Finals tournament
BWF Super Series Premier tournament
BWF Super Series tournament

=== BWF Grand Prix (5 titles, 5 runners-up) ===
The BWF Grand Prix had two levels, the Grand Prix and Grand Prix Gold. It was a series of badminton tournaments sanctioned by the Badminton World Federation (BWF) and played between 2007 and 2017.

Men's doubles
Year	Tournament	Partner	Opponent	Score	Result
2014	China Masters	(China) Zhang Wen	(China) Kang Jun (China) Liu Cheng	13–21, 16–21	(silver) Runner-up
2014	Bitburger Open	(China) Zhang Wen	(Denmark) Kim Astrup (Denmark) Anders Skaarup Rasmussen	21–14, 21–10	(gold) Winner
2015	China Masters	(China) Zhang Wen	(China) Li Junhui (China) Liu Yuchen	15–21, 21–19, 12–21	(silver) Runner-up
2015	Brasil Open	(China) Zhang Wen	(China) Huang Kaixiang (China) Zheng Siwei	24–22, 10–21, 14–21	(silver) Runner-up
2017	Thailand Masters	(China) Huang Kaixiang	(Chinese Taipei) Lu Ching-yao (Chinese Taipei) Yang Po-han	21–19, 21–23, 21–16	(gold) Winner

Mixed doubles
Year	Tournament	Partner	Opponent	Score	Result
2013	U.S. Open	(China) Huang Yaqiong	(Hong Kong) Lee Chun Hei (Hong Kong) Chau Hoi Wah	8–21, 14–21	(silver) Runner-up
2014	India Grand Prix Gold	(China) Huang Yaqiong	(China) Huang Kaixiang (China) Chen Qingchen	21–18, 21–14	(gold) Winner
2014	China Masters	(China) Xia Huan	(China) Lu Kai (China) Huang Yaqiong	12–21, 14–21	(silver) Runner-up
2016	Swiss Open	(China) Chen Qingchen	(Thailand) Bodin Isara (Thailand) Savitree Amitrapai	19–21, 21–16, 21–15	(gold) Winner
2017	China Masters	(China) Huang Dongping	(Chinese Taipei) Liao Min-chun (Chinese Taipei) Chen Hsiao-huan	21–14, 21–10	(gold) Winner

BWF Grand Prix Gold tournament
BWF Grand Prix tournament

=== BWF International Challenge/Series (4 titles) ===
Men's doubles
Year	Tournament	Partner	Opponent	Score	Result
2014	China International	(China) Zhang Wen	(Chinese Taipei) Liao Chi-hung (Chinese Taipei) Liao I-liang	21–14, 21–12	(gold) Winner
2015	China International	(China) Zhang Wen	(China) Li Junhui (China) Liu Yuchen	21–10, 22–20	(gold) Winner
2016	China International	(China) Zhang Wen	(China) Wang Sijie (China) Zhu Junhao	21–9, 21–15	(gold) Winner

Mixed doubles
Year	Tournament	Partner	Opponent	Score	Result
2014	China International	(China) Ou Dongni	(China) Zhang Wen (China) Xia Huan	21–18, 15–21, 21–19	(gold) Winner

BWF International Challenge tournament
BWF International Series tournament
