= 2014 Badminton Asia Championships =

Badminton championships

Tournament information
- Location: Gimcheon, South Korea
- Dates: April 22–April 27

The 2014 Badminton Asia Championships was the 33rd edition of the Badminton Asia Championships. It was held in Gimcheon, South Korea, from April 22 to April 27.

== Venue ==
- Gimcheon Indoor Stadium.

== Medalists ==
Event	Gold	Silver	Bronze
Men's singles	Lin Dan (CHN)	Sho Sasaki (JPN)	Hwang Jong-soo (KOR)
Men's singles	Lin Dan (CHN)	Sho Sasaki (JPN)	Liu Kai (CHN)
Women's singles	Sung Ji-hyun (KOR)	Wang Shixian (CHN)	P V Sindhu (IND)
Women's singles	Sung Ji-hyun (KOR)	Wang Shixian (CHN)	Sayaka Takahashi (JPN)
Men's doubles	Shin Baek-choel (KOR); Yoo Yeon-seong (KOR)	Li Junhui (CHN); Liu Yuchen (CHN)	Maneepong Jongjit (THA); Nipitphon Puangpuapech (THA)
Men's doubles	Shin Baek-choel (KOR); Yoo Yeon-seong (KOR)	Li Junhui (CHN); Liu Yuchen (CHN)	Chen Zhuofu (CHN); Shi Longfei (CHN)
Women's doubles	Luo Ying (CHN); Luo Yu (CHN)	Kim Ha-na (KOR); Jung Kyung-eun (KOR)	Ashwini Ponnappa (IND); Jwala Gutta (IND)
Women's doubles	Luo Ying (CHN); Luo Yu (CHN)	Kim Ha-na (KOR); Jung Kyung-eun (KOR)	Zhong Qianxin (CHN); Xia Huan (CHN)
Mixed doubles	Lee Chun Hei (HKG); Chau Hoi Wah (HKG)	Shin Baek-choel (KOR); Jang Ye-na (KOR)	Sudket Prapakamol (THA); Saralee Thoungthongkam (THA)
Mixed doubles	Lee Chun Hei (HKG); Chau Hoi Wah (HKG)	Shin Baek-choel (KOR); Jang Ye-na (KOR)	Zhang Wen (CHN); Xia Huan (CHN)

== Final results ==
=== Men's singles ===
Semi-finals
(China) Lin Dan	21	21
(China) Liu Kai	14	13
(South Korea) Hwang Jong-soo	13	15
(Japan) Sho Sasaki	21	21

Final
(China) Lin Dan	14	21	21
(Japan) Sho Sasaki	21	9	15

=== Women's singles ===
Semi-finals
1	(China) Wang Shixian	15	22	21
(India) P. V. Sindhu	21	20	12
4	(South Korea) Sung Ji-hyun	23	21
(Japan) Sayaka Takahashi	21	13

Final
1	(China) Wang Shixian	19	15
4	(South Korea) Sung Ji-hyun	21	21

=== Men's doubles ===
Semi-finals
(China) Chen Zhuofu (China) Shi Longfei	9	14
(China) Li Junhui (China) Liu Yuchen	21	21
3	(Thailand) Maneepong Jongjit (Thailand) Nipitphon Puangpuapech	17	20
(South Korea) Shin Baek-cheol (South Korea) Yoo Yeon-seong	21	22

Final
(China) Li Junhui (China) Liu Yuchen	20	17
(South Korea) Shin Baek-cheol (South Korea) Yoo Yeon-seong	22	21

=== Women's doubles ===
Semi-finals
(China) Luo Ying (China) Luo Yu	21	21
(India) Ashwini Ponnappa (India) Jwala Gutta	12	7
(China) Xia Huan (China) Zhong Qianxin	23	15	16
2	(South Korea) Jung Kyung-eun (South Korea) Kim Ha-na	21	21	21

Final
(China) Luo Ying (China) Luo Yu	21	21
2	(South Korea) Jung Kyung-eun (South Korea) Kim Ha-na	18	18

=== Mixed doubles ===
Semi-finals
(China) Zhang Wen (China) Xia Huan	13	15
3	(Hong Kong) Lee Chun Hei (Hong Kong) Chau Hoi Wah	21	21
4	(South Korea) Shin Baek-cheol (South Korea) Chang Ye-na	21	21
2	(Thailand) Sudket Prapakamol (Thailand) Saralee Thungthongkam	11	12

Final
3	(Hong Kong) Lee Chun Hei (Hong Kong) Chau Hoi Wah	13	21	21
4	(South Korea) Shin Baek-cheol (South Korea) Chang Ye-na	21	15	15
