= Liu Cheng (badminton) =

Chinese badminton player

Liu Cheng 刘成
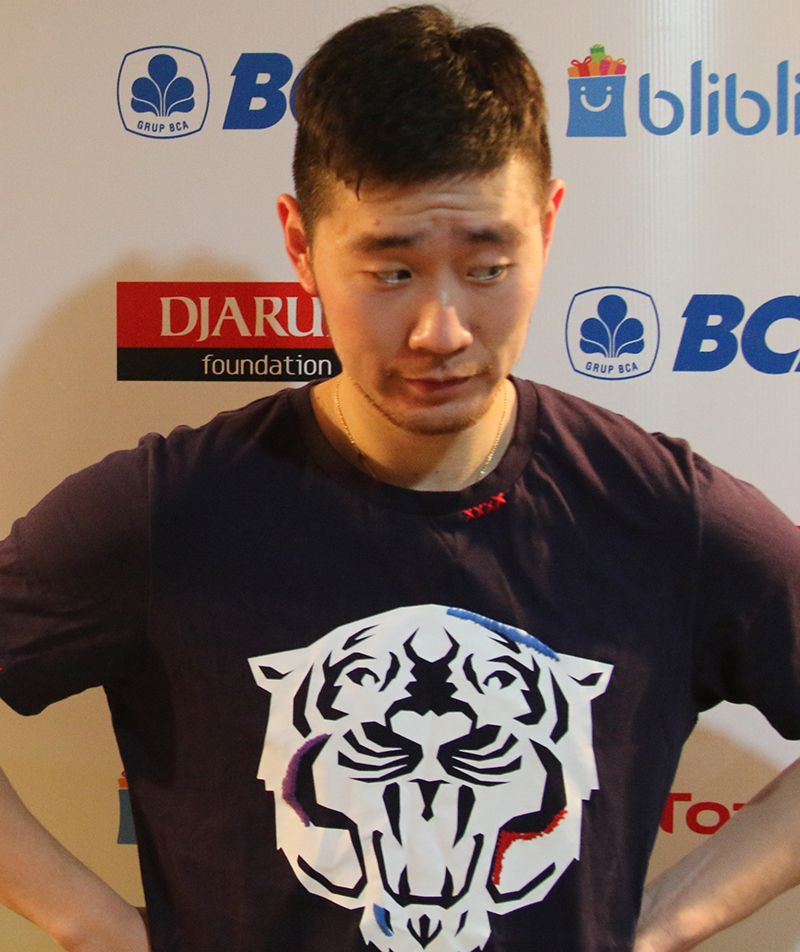

Personal information
- Born: 4 January 1992 (age 34) Sanming, Fujian, China
- Height: 1.84 m (6 ft 0 in)
- Weight: 82 kg (181 lb)
- Spouse: Bao Yixin (m. 2019)

Sport
- Country: China
- Sport: Badminton
- Handedness: Right
- Retired: 30 June 2022

Men's & mixed doubles
- Highest ranking: 2 (MD with Zhang Nan 21 June 2018); 2 (XD with Bao Yixin 3 December 2015)
- BWF profile
Medal record
Men's badminton
Representing China
World Championships
Gold medal – first place	2017 Glasgow	Men's doubles
Silver medal – second place	2015 Jakarta	Mixed doubles
Bronze medal – third place	2014 Copenhagen	Mixed doubles
Bronze medal – third place	2018 Nanjing	Men's doubles
Sudirman Cup
Gold medal – first place	2015 Dongguan	Mixed team
Gold medal – first place	2021 Vantaa	Mixed team
Thomas Cup
Gold medal – first place	2018 Bangkok	Men's team
Silver medal – second place	2020 Aarhus	Men's team
Asian Games
Gold medal – first place	2018 Jakarta-Palembang	Men's team
Asian Championships
Bronze medal – third place	2018 Wuhan	Men's doubles
Asia Mixed Team Championships
Bronze medal – third place	2017 Ho Chi Minh	Mixed team
Summer Universiade
Silver medal – second place	2013 Kazan	Mixed doubles
Silver medal – second place	2013 Kazan	Mixed team
World Junior Championships
Gold medal – first place	2009 Alor Setar	Mixed team
Gold medal – first place	2010 Guadalajara	Mixed doubles
Gold medal – first place	2010 Guadalajara	Mixed team
Asian Junior Championships
Gold medal – first place	2010 Kuala Lumpur	Mixed doubles
Gold medal – first place	2010 Kuala Lumpur	Mixed team

Liu Cheng (Chinese: 刘成; born 4 January 1992) is a retired badminton player who represented China. He was the men's doubles World Champion in 2017 partnered with Zhang Nan, also the mixed doubles World and Asian Junior Champion in 2010 with Bao Yixin. Liu was part of the national team member that won the team events at the 2015, 2021 Sudirman Cup, 2018 Thomas Cup and 2018 Asian Games. He reached a career high of world number 2 in both men's and mixed doubles events. He announced his retirement from the international tournament on 30 June 2022.

== Achievements ==
=== BWF World Championships ===
Men's doubles
Year	Venue	Partner	Opponent	Score	Result
2017	Emirates Arena; Glasgow, Scotland	(China) Zhang Nan	(Indonesia) Mohammad Ahsan (Indonesia) Rian Agung Saputro	21–10, 21–17	Gold
2018	Nanjing Youth Olympic Sports Park; Nanjing, China	(China) Zhang Nan	(China) Li Junhui (China) Liu Yuchen	15–21, 13–21	Bronze

Mixed doubles
Year	Venue	Partner	Opponent	Score	Result
2014	Ballerup Super Arena; Copenhagen, Denmark	(China) Bao Yixin	(China) Zhang Nan (China) Zhao Yunlei	15–21, 13–21	Bronze
2015	Istora Senayan; Jakarta, Indonesia	(China) Bao Yixin	(China) Zhang Nan (China) Zhao Yunlei	17–21, 11–21	Silver

=== Asian Championships ===
Men's doubles
Year	Venue	Partner	Opponent	Score	Result
2018	Wuhan Sports Center Gymnasium; Wuhan, China	(China) Zhang Nan	(Japan) Takeshi Kamura (Japan) Keigo Sonoda	21–14, 12–21, 23–25	Bronze

=== Summer Universiade ===
Mixed doubles
Year	Venue	Partner	Opponent	Score	Result
2013	Tennis Academy; Kazan, Russia	(China) Tian Qing	(South Korea) Kim Gi-jung (South Korea) Kim So-young	20–22, 14–21	Silver

=== BWF World Junior Championships ===
Mixed doubles
Year	Venue	Partner	Opponent	Score	Result
2010	Domo del Code Jalisco; Guadalajara, Mexico	(China) Bao Yixin	(South Korea) Kang Ji-wook (South Korea) Choi Hye-in	21–15, 21–15	Gold

=== Asian Junior Championships ===
Mixed doubles
Year	Venue	Partner	Opponent	Score	Result
2010	Stadium Juara; Kuala Lumpur, Malaysia	(China) Bao Yixin	(Malaysia) Ow Yao Han (Malaysia) Lai Pei Jing	Walkover	Gold

=== BWF World Tour (2 runners-up) ===
The BWF World Tour, which was announced on 19 March 2017 and implemented in 2018, is a series of elite badminton tournaments sanctioned by the Badminton World Federation (BWF). The BWF World Tour is divided into levels of World Tour Finals, Super 1000, Super 750, Super 500, Super 300 (part of the HSBC World Tour), and the BWF Tour Super 100.

Men's doubles
Year	Tournament	Level	Partner	Opponent	Score	Result
2019	Macau Open	Super 300	(China) Huang Kaixiang	(China) Li Junhui (China) Liu Yuchen	8–21, 21–18, 20–22	(silver) Runner-up
2020	Thailand Masters	Super 300	(China) Huang Kaixiang	(Malaysia) Ong Yew Sin (Malaysia) Teo Ee Yi	21–18, 17–21, 17–21	(silver) Runner-up

=== BWF Superseries (2 titles, 7 runners-up) ===
The BWF Superseries, which was launched on 14 December 2006 and implemented in 2007, was a series of elite badminton tournaments, sanctioned by the Badminton World Federation (BWF). BWF Superseries levels were Superseries and Superseries Premier. A season of Superseries consisted of twelve tournaments around the world that had been introduced since 2011. Successful players were invited to the Superseries Finals, which were held at the end of each year.

Men's doubles
Year	Tournament	Partner	Opponent	Score	Result
2015	Australian Open	(China) Lu Kai	(South Korea) Lee Yong-dae (South Korea) Yoo Yeon-seong	16–21, 17–21	(silver) Runner-up
2015	Denmark Open	(China) Lu Kai	(South Korea) Lee Yong-dae (South Korea) Yoo Yeon-seong	8–21, 14–21	(silver) Runner-up
2017	Denmark Open	(China) Zhang Nan	(Indonesia) Marcus Fernaldi Gideon (Indonesia) Kevin Sanjaya Sukamuljo	21–16, 22–24, 21–19	(gold) Winner
2017	Dubai World Superseries Finals	(China) Zhang Nan	(Indonesia) Marcus Fernaldi Gideon (Indonesia) Kevin Sanjaya Sukamuljo	16–21, 15–21	(silver) Runner-up

Mixed doubles
Year	Tournament	Partner	Opponent	Score	Result
2013	Hong Kong Open	(China) Bao Yixin	(England) Chris Adcock (England) Gabby Adcock	14–21, 22–24	(silver) Runner-up
2014	Dubai World Superseries Finals	(China) Bao Yixin	(China) Zhang Nan (China) Zhao Yunlei	15–21, 12–21	(silver) Runner-up
2015	India Open	(China) Bao Yixin	(Denmark) Joachim Fischer Nielsen (Denmark) Christinna Pedersen	21–19, 21–19	(gold) Winner
2015	Australian Open	(China) Bao Yixin	(Hong Kong) Lee Chun Hei (Hong Kong) Chau Hoi Wah	19–21, 21–19, 15–21	(silver) Runner-up
2015	Hong Kong Open	(China) Bao Yixin	(China) Zhang Nan (China) Zhao Yunlei	17–21, 21–17, 17–21	(silver) Runner-up

BWF Super Series Finals tournament
BWF Super Series Premier tournament
BWF Super Series tournament

=== BWF Grand Prix (2 titles, 2 runners-up) ===
The BWF Grand Prix had two levels, the Grand Prix and Grand Prix Gold. It was a series of badminton tournaments sanctioned by the Badminton World Federation (BWF) and played between 2007 and 2017.

Men's doubles
Year	Tournament	Partner	Opponent	Score	Result
2014	China Masters	(China) Kang Jun	(China) Wang Yilyu (China) Zhang Wen	21–13, 21–16	(gold) Winner
2017	Swiss Open	(China) Zhang Nan	(China) Chai Biao (China) Hong Wei	21–13, 16–21, 15–21	(silver) Runner-up

Mixed doubles
Year	Tournament	Partner	Opponent	Score	Result
2015	Swiss Open	(China) Bao Yixin	(China) Lu Kai (China) Huang Yaqiong	21–17, 20–22, 13–21	(silver) Runner-up
2015	China Masters	(China) Bao Yixin	(Indonesia) Edi Subaktiar (Indonesia) Gloria Emanuelle Widjaja	18–21, 21–15, 26–24	(gold) Winner

BWF Grand Prix Gold tournament
BWF Grand Prix tournament
