= 2018 BWF World Championships – Men's doubles =

Badminton championships

Men's doubles at the BWF World Championships
- Venue: Nanjing Youth Olympic Sports Park Indoor Arena
- Location: Nanjing, China
- Dates: 30 July – 5 August

Medalists
| gold medal | Li Junhui; Liu Yuchen | China |
| silver medal | Takeshi Kamura; Keigo Sonoda | Japan |
| bronze medal | Chen Hung-ling; Wang Chi-lin | Chinese Taipei |
| bronze medal | Liu Cheng; Zhang Nan | China |

The men's doubles tournament of the 2018 BWF World Championships (World Badminton Championships) took place from 30 July to 5 August.

== Seeds ==
The seeding list is based on the World Rankings from 12 July 2018.

1. (Indonesia) Marcus Fernaldi Gideon / Kevin Sanjaya Sukamuljo (quarterfinals)
2. (China) Liu Cheng / Zhang Nan (semifinals)
3. (Denmark) Mathias Boe / Carsten Mogensen (third round)
4. (China) Li Junhui / Liu Yuchen (champions)
5. (Japan) Takeshi Kamura / Keigo Sonoda (final)
6. (Denmark) Mads Conrad-Petersen / Mads Pieler Kolding (quarterfinals)
7. (Japan) Takuto Inoue / Yuki Kaneko (quarterfinals)
8. (Denmark) Kim Astrup / Anders Skaarup Rasmussen (third round)

9. (Indonesia) Fajar Alfian / Muhammad Rian Ardianto (third round)
10. (Russia) Vladimir Ivanov / Ivan Sozonov (third round)
11. (Chinese Taipei) Liao Min-chun / Su Ching-heng (third round)
12. (Chinese Taipei) Lee Jhe-huei / Lee Yang (second round)
13. (Malaysia) Goh V Shem / Tan Wee Kiong (third round)
14. (Chinese Taipei) Chen Hung-ling / Wang Chi-lin (semifinals)
15. (Indonesia) Berry Angriawan / Hardianto (third round)
16. (Japan) Hiroyuki Endo / Yuta Watanabe (third round)

Click on the seed number of a player to go to their draw section.

== Draw ==
=== Finals ===
Semifinals
5 | (Japan) Takeshi Kamura (Japan) Keigo Sonoda | 21 | 21
14 | (Chinese Taipei) Chen Hung-ling (Chinese Taipei) Wang Chi-lin | 17 | 10
4 | (China) Li Junhui (China) Liu Yuchen | 21 | 21
2 | (China) Liu Cheng (China) Zhang Nan | 15 | 13

Final
5 | (Japan) Takeshi Kamura (Japan) Keigo Sonoda | 12 | 19
4 | (China) Li Junhui (China) Liu Yuchen | 21 | 21

=== Top half ===
==== Section 1 ====
First round
(China) Han CK (China) Zhou HD | 21 | 21
(Poland) M Bochat (Poland) A Cwalina | 19 | 11
(Vietnam) Bảo M (Vietnam) Dương B D | 22 | 21
(Bulgaria) P Boichino (Bulgaria) I Panev | 20 | 18
(Thailand) T Isriyanet (Thailand) K Namdash | 21 | 21
(Russia) E Dremin (Russia) D Grachev | 15 | 12
(Jordan) B A Alshannik (Jordan) M N M Nayef | 10 | 6
(Netherlands) J Arends (Netherlands) R Jille | 21 | 21

Second round
1 | (Indonesia) M F Gideon (Indonesia) K S Sukamuljo | 18 | 21 | 21
(China) Han CK (China) Zhou HD | 21 | 14 | 18
10 | (Russia) V Ivanov (Russia) I Sozonov | 21 | 21
(Vietnam) Bảo M (Vietnam) Dương B D | 13 | 14
5 | (Japan) T Kamura (Japan) K Sonoda | 21 | 18 | 21
(Thailand) T Isriyanet (Thailand) K Namdash | 12 | 21 | 16
9 | (Indonesia) F Alfian (Indonesia) M R Ardianto | 21 | 21
(Netherlands) J Arends (Netherlands) R Jille | 15 | 11

Third round
1 | (Indonesia) M F Gideon (Indonesia) K S Sukamuljo | 21 | 21
10 | (Russia) V Ivanov (Russia) I Sozonov | 19 | 12
5 | (Japan) T Kamura (Japan) K Sonoda | 21 | 21
9 | (Indonesia) F Alfian (Indonesia) M R Ardianto | 17 | 16

Quarterfinals
1 | (Indonesia) M F Gideon (Indonesia) K S Sukamuljo | 19 | 18
5 | (Japan) T Kamura (Japan) K Sonoda | 21 | 21

==== Section 2 ====
First round
(Netherlands) J Maas (Netherlands) R Tabeling | 21 | 19 | 21
(United States) P Chew (United States) R Chew | 13 | 21 | 15
(Canada) J Ho-shue (Canada) N Yakura | 16 | 8
(Germany) M Lamsfuß (Germany) M E Seidel | 21 | 21
(Bulgaria) D Nikolov (Bulgaria) I Rusev | 13 | 18
(India) M Attri (India) B. R Reddy | 21 | 21
(Thailand) K Kedren (Thailand) D Puavaranukroh | 15 | 21 | 15
(Indonesia) W Nayaka (Indonesia) A Yusuf | 21 | 17 | 21

Second round
3 | (Denmark) M Boe (Denmark) C Mogensen | 21 | 21
(Netherlands) J Maas (Netherlands) R Tabeling | 11 | 19
14 | (Chinese Taipei) Chen H-l (Chinese Taipei) Wang C-l | 21 | 21
(Germany) M Lamsfuß (Germany) M E Seidel | 11 | 14
7 | (Japan) T Inoue (Japan) Y Kaneko | 22 | 21 | 21
(India) M Attri (India) B. R Reddy | 24 | 13 | 16
15 | (Indonesia) B Angriawan (Indonesia) Hardianto | 21 | 21
(Indonesia) W Nayaka (Indonesia) A Yusuf | 18 | 18

Third round
3 | (Denmark) M Boe (Denmark) C Mogensen | 19 | 10
14 | (Chinese Taipei) Chen H-l (Chinese Taipei) Wang C-l | 21 | 21
7 | (Japan) T Inoue (Japan) Y Kaneko | 21 | 20 | 21
15 | (Indonesia) B Angriawan (Indonesia) Hardianto | 11 | 22 | 16

Quarterfinals
14 | (Chinese Taipei) Chen H-l (Chinese Taipei) Wang C-l | 21 | 17 | 21
7 | (Japan) T Inoue (Japan) Y Kaneko | 11 | 21 | 13

=== Bottom half ===
==== Section 3 ====
First round
(South Korea) Chung E-s (South Korea) Kim D-y | 15 | 18
(Malaysia) A Chia (Malaysia) Soh W Y | 21 | 21
(India) S Rankireddy (India) C Shetty | 21 | 12 | 21
(England) M Ellis (England) C Langridge | 19 | 21 | 19
(Malaysia) Ong Y S (Malaysia) Teo E Y | 21 | 21
(India) Arjun M.R. (India) R Shlok | 14 | 15
(Egypt) A Abdelhakim (Egypt) A Salah | 7 | 15
(Japan) T Hoki (Japan) Y Kobayashi | 21 | 21

Second round
(Malaysia) A Chia (Malaysia) Soh W Y | 16 | 21 | 21
12 | (Chinese Taipei) Lee J-h (Chinese Taipei) Lee Y | 21 | 18 | 19
(India) S Rankireddy (India) C Shetty | 18 | 21 | 16
8 | (Denmark) K Astrup (Denmark) A S Rasmussen | 21 | 15 | 21
(Malaysia) Ong Y S (Malaysia) Teo E Y | 16 | 15
13 | (Malaysia) Goh V S (Malaysia) Tan W K | 21 | 21
(Japan) T Hoki (Japan) Y Kobayashi | 16 | 10
4 | (China) Li JH (China) Liu YC | 21 | 21

Third round
(Malaysia) A Chia (Malaysia) Soh W Y | 21 | 21
8 | (Denmark) K Astrup (Denmark) A S Rasmussen | 18 | 16
13 | (Malaysia) Goh V S (Malaysia) Tan W K | 21 | 15 | 20
4 | (China) Li JH (China) Liu YC | 16 | 21 | 22

Quarterfinals
(Malaysia) A Chia (Malaysia) Soh W Y | 14 | 22
4 | (China) Li JH (China) Liu YC | 21 | 24

==== Section 4 ====
First round
(Scotland) A Dunn (Scotland) A Hall | 12 | 21 | 21
(Chinese Taipei) Lu C-y (Chinese Taipei) Yang P-h | 21 | 17 | 19
(China) He JT (China) Tan Q | 21 | 21
(Vietnam) Đỗ T D (Vietnam) Phạm H N | 10 | 14
(Germany) J R Jansen (Germany) J Zurwonne | 21 | 21
(Russia) K Abramov (Russia) A Zinchenko | 15 | 17
(Hong Kong) Or C C (Hong Kong) Tang C M | 22 | 18 | 21
(India) T Kona (India) S Sharma | 20 | 21 | 17

Second round
(Scotland) A Dunn (Scotland) A Hall | 13 | 15
11 | (Chinese Taipei) Liao M-c (Chinese Taipei) Su C-h | 21 | 21
(China) He JT (China) Tan Q | 20 | 16
6 | (Denmark) M Conrad-Petersen (Denmark) M P Kolding | 22 | 21
(Germany) J R Jansen (Germany) J Zurwonne | 13 | 12
16 | (Japan) H Endo (Japan) Y Watanabe | 21 | 21
(Hong Kong) Or C C (Hong Kong) Tang C M | 12 | 21 | 12
2 | (China) Liu C (China) Zhang N | 21 | 15 | 21

Third round
11 | (Chinese Taipei) Liao M-c (Chinese Taipei) Su C-h | 17 | 9
6 | (Denmark) M Conrad-Petersen (Denmark) M P Kolding | 21 | 21
16 | (Japan) H Endo (Japan) Y Watanabe | 15 | 14
2 | (China) Liu C (China) Zhang N | 21 | 21

Quarterfinals
6 | (Denmark) M Conrad-Petersen (Denmark) M P Kolding | 13 | 21 | 18
2 | (China) Liu C (China) Zhang N | 21 | 14 | 21
