= 2013 BWF World Junior Championships – Boys doubles =

The Boys Doubles tournament of the 2013 BWF World Junior Championships was held from October 29 until November 3. Last year tournament won by Hong Kong pair Lee Chun Hei and Ng Ka Long.

In the all-Chinese final this year, Li Junhui and Liu Yuchen took the gold medal after beating their compatriots Huang Kaixiang and Zheng Siwei 14-21, 21-13, 22-20.

== Seeded ==
1. (China) Li Junhui / Liu Yuchen (champion)
2. (Indonesia) Kevin Sanjaya Sukamuljo / Arya Maulana Aldiartama (quarter-final)
3. (South Korea) Kim Jae-hwan / Kim Jung-ho (third round)
4. (China) Tao Jianqi / Zhao Jian (third round)
5. (China) Huang Kaixiang / Zheng Siwei (final)
6. (Germany) Johannes Pistorius / Marvin Seidel (first round)
7. (Thailand) Dechapol Puavaranukroh / Kittinupong Ketlen (third round)
8. (Chinese Taipei) Tien Tzu-chieh / Wang Chi-lin (semi-final)
9. (Chinese Taipei) Chang Ko-chi / Liao Chi-hung (quarter-final)
10. (Malaysia) Chua Keh Yeap / Muhammad Amzzar Zainuddin (third round)
11. (Malaysia) Chua Khek Wei / Woon Mun Choon (second round)
12. (Malaysia) Darren Isaac Devadass / Ong Yew Sin (quarter-final)
13. (Russia) Andrey Dolotov / Alexandr Zinchenko (second round)
14. (Bulgaria) Stefan Garev / Vladimir Shishkov (second round)
15. (Netherlands) Ruben Jille / Justin Teeuwen (second round)
16. (Hong Kong) Lee Cheuk Yiu / Yeung Shing Choi (third round)

== Draw ==
=== Finals ===
Quarterfinals
1	(China) Li Junhui (China) Liu Yuchen	21	21
(Indonesia) Fajar Alfian (Indonesia) Yantoni Edy Saputra	14	18
9/16	(Malaysia) Darren Isaac Devadass (Malaysia) Ong Yew Sin	18	21	19
5/8	(Chinese Taipei) Tien Tzu-chieh (Chinese Taipei) Wang Chi-lin	21	15	21
(South Korea) Choi Jong-woo (South Korea) Seo Seung-jae	21	23
9/16	(Chinese Taipei) Chang Ko-chi (Chinese Taipei) Liao Chi-hung	14	21
5/8	(China) Huang Kaixiang (China) Zheng Siwei	23	24
2	(Indonesia) Kevin Sanjaya Sukamuljo (Indonesia) Arya Maulana Aldiartama	21	22

Semifinals
1	(China) Li Junhui (China) Liu Yuchen	21	21
5/8	(Chinese Taipei) Tien Tzu-chieh (Chinese Taipei) Wang Chi-lin	10	17
(South Korea) Choi Jong-woo (South Korea) Seo Seung-jae	11	13
5/8	(China) Huang Kaixiang (China) Zheng Siwei	21	21

Final
1	(China) Li Junhui (China) Liu Yuchen	14	21	22
5/8	(China) Huang Kaixiang (China) Zheng Siwei	21	13	20

=== Top Half ===
==== Section 1 ====
First Round
1	(China) Li JH (China) Liu YC
BYE
(Armenia) G Hakobyan (Armenia) E Nazaretyan	5	6
(Thailand) K Namdash (Thailand) W Thongsa-Nga	21	21
9/16	(Malaysia) Chua KY (Malaysia) A Zainuddin	21	21
(South Africa) M Jennings (South Africa) B von Bodenstein	13	8
(Guatemala) R Castellanos (Guatemala) B Samayoa	19	13
(Australia) A Joe (Australia) Low PS	21	21

Second Round
1	(China) Li JH (China) Liu YC	21	21
(Thailand) K Namdash (Thailand) W Thongsa-Nga	16	17
9/16	(Malaysia) Chua KY (Malaysia) A Zainuddin	21	21
(Australia) A Joe (Australia) Low PS	12	8

Third Round
1	(China) Li JH (China) Liu YC	21	21
9/16	(Malaysia) Chua KY (Malaysia) A Zainuddin	12	14

==== Section 2 ====
First Round
5/8	(Thailand) D Puavaranukroh (Thailand) K Ketlen	21	21
(Denmark) M Sorensen (Denmark) J Eipe	18	9
(Finland) A Klutas (Finland) V Nieminen	14	10
(Chinese Taipei) Chiang Y-w (Chinese Taipei) Lee Y	21	21
9/16	(Netherlands) R Jille (Netherlands) J Teeuwen	21	21
(Brazil) Y de Oliveira (Brazil) F Soares	17	14
(Indonesia) F Alfian (Indonesia) Y Saputra	21	21
(Vietnam) Nguyen DTK (Vietnam) Pham CC	18	14

Second Round
5/8	(Thailand) D Puavaranukroh (Thailand) K Ketlen	21	21
(Chinese Taipei) Chiang Y-w (Chinese Taipei) Lee Y	17	18
9/16	(Netherlands) R Jille (Netherlands) J Teeuwen	7	16
(Indonesia) F Alfian (Indonesia) Y Saputra	21	21

Third Round
5/8	(Thailand) D Puavaranukroh (Thailand) K Ketlen	12	21	22
(Indonesia) F Alfian (Indonesia) Y Saputra	21	8	24

==== Section 3 ====
First Round
3/4	(South Korea) Kim J-w (South Korea) Kim J-h	21	21
(India) C Reddy (India) S Ravuri	8	19
(Japan) Y Igarashi (Japan) Y Nakazato	21	21
(Turkey) E Sesalan (Turkey) S Zorlu	15	14
9/16	(Malaysia) D Devadass (Malaysia) Ong YS	24	21
(France) V Heriau (France) L Mittelheisser	22	7
(Philippines) C Canayan (Philippines) A Morada	21	21
(Germany) L Schaenzler (Germany) M Weisskirchen	18	17

Second Round
3/4	(South Korea) Kim J-w (South Korea) Kim J-h	21	21
(Japan) Y Igarashi (Japan) Y Nakazato	18	14
9/16	(Malaysia) D Devadass (Malaysia) Ong YS	21	21	21
(Philippines) C Canayan (Philippines) A Morada	14	23	13

Third Round
3/4	(South Korea) Kim J-w (South Korea) Kim J-h	17	21	19
9/16	(Malaysia) D Devadass (Malaysia) Ong YS	21	18	21

==== Section 4 ====
First Round
5/8	(Chinese Taipei) Tien T-c (Chinese Taipei) Wang C-l	21	21
(Canada) N Cheng (Canada) B Lau	15	15
(Sweden) F Burestedt (Sweden) D Ojaaar	11	17
(Spain) E Penalver (Spain) J Suarez	21	21
9/16	(Russia) A Dolotov (Russia) A Zinchenko	21	21
(Sri Lanka) K Halambage (Sri Lanka) P Ranaweera	10	15
(Hong Kong) Y Chung (Hong Kong) Lee CW	21	22
(United States) A Khor (United States) A Shekhtman	15	20

Second Round
5/8	(Chinese Taipei) Tien T-c (Chinese Taipei) Wang C-l	21	21
(Spain) E Penalver (Spain) J Suarez	16	14
9/16	(Russia) A Dolotov (Russia) A Zinchenko	12	23
(Hong Kong) Y Chung (Hong Kong) Lee CW	21	25

Third Round
5/8	(Chinese Taipei) Tien T-c (Chinese Taipei) Wang C-l	21	21
(Hong Kong) Y Chung (Hong Kong) Lee CW	17	10

=== Bottom Half ===
==== Section 5 ====
First Round
(India) S Prasad (India) S Ramachandran	18	16
(Thailand) K Chairojkanjana (Thailand) S Pol-Gul	21	21
(Uzbekistan) A Bakhshullaev (Uzbekistan) M Rakhimov	6	6
9/16	(Malaysia) Chua KW (Malaysia) Woon MC	21	21
(Sri Lanka) B Goonathileka (Sri Lanka) S Angodavidanalage	21	21
(Philippines) R Pedrosa (Philippines) W Lopez II	8	10
(South Korea) Choi J-w (South Korea) Seo S-j	21	11	21
5/8	(Germany) J Pistorius (Germany) M Seidel	14	21	12

Second Round
(Thailand) K Chairojkanjana (Thailand) S Pol-Gul	21	18	29
9/16	(Malaysia) Chua KW (Malaysia) Woon MC	17	21	27
(Sri Lanka) B Goonathileka (Sri Lanka) S Angodavidanalage	19	12
(South Korea) Choi J-w (South Korea) Seo S-j	21	21

Third Round
(Thailand) K Chairojkanjana (Thailand) S Pol-Gul	16	18
(South Korea) Choi J-w (South Korea) Seo S-j	21	21

==== Section 6 ====
First Round
(Canada) B Lin (Canada) D Yao	19	23
(Indonesia) A Mahardika (Indonesia) F Saputra	21	25
(Vietnam) Do TD (Vietnam) Pham HN	14	14
9/16	(Chinese Taipei) Chang K-c (Chinese Taipei) Liao C-h	21	21
(Russia) S Molodov (Russia) D Riabov	5	21
(Japan) H Shimono (Japan) K Tsuneyama	21	23
(South Korea) Kang H-s (South Korea) Park K-h	14	17
3/4	(China) Tao JQ (China) Zhao J	21	21

Second Round
(Indonesia) A Mahardika (Indonesia) F Saputra	20	14
9/16	(Chinese Taipei) Chang K-c (Chinese Taipei) Liao C-h	22	21
(Japan) H Shimono (Japan) K Tsuneyama	17	21	19
3/4	(China) Tao JQ (China) Zhao J	21	18	21

Third Round
9/16	(Chinese Taipei) Chang K-c (Chinese Taipei) Liao C-h	21	21
3/4	(China) Tao JQ (China) Zhao J	15	13

==== Section 7 ====
First Round
(Denmark) A Bond (Denmark) F Mortensen	21	21
(Spain) V Riera (Spain) P Sanmartin	10	9
(Australia) D Guda (Australia) E Vuong	18	19
9/16	(Bulgaria) S Garev (Bulgaria) V Shishkov	21	21
(Scotland) A Hall (Scotland) J Neil	21	21
(United States) R Liu (United States) R Zeng	10	10
(Japan) T Hoki (Japan) Y Kobayashi	13	16
5/8	(China) Huang KX (China) Zheng SW	21	21

Second Round
(Denmark) A Bond (Denmark) F Mortensen	21	21
9/16	(Bulgaria) S Garev (Bulgaria) V Shishkov	13	6
(Scotland) A Hall (Scotland) J Neil	9	13
5/8	(China) Huang KX (China) Zheng SW	21	21

Third Round
(Denmark) A Bond (Denmark) F Mortensen	11	12
5/8	(China) Huang KX (China) Zheng SW	21	21

==== Section 8 ====
First Round
(Botswana) P Leoke (Botswana) T Perekisi	6	5
(Singapore) T Hee (Singapore) R Ng	21	21
(Czech Republic) J Janacek (Czech Republic) A Mendrek	17	12
9/16	(Hong Kong) Lee CY (Hong Kong) Yeung SC	21	21
(France) T Citron (France) J Corvee	21	21
(Macau) Tai KH (Macau) Wan WC	17	16
BYE
2	(Indonesia) K Sukamuljo (Indonesia) A Aldiartama

Second Round
(Singapore) T Hee (Singapore) R Ng	18	21	16
9/16	(Hong Kong) Lee CY (Hong Kong) Yeung SC	21	16	21
(France) T Citron (France) J Corvee	8	13
2	(Indonesia) K Sukamuljo (Indonesia) A Aldiartama	21	21

Third Round
9/16	(Hong Kong) Lee CY (Hong Kong) Yeung SC	15	15
2	(Indonesia) K Sukamuljo (Indonesia) A Aldiartama	21	21
