= Liu Yuchen =

Chinese badminton player (born 1995)

Liu Yuchen 刘雨辰
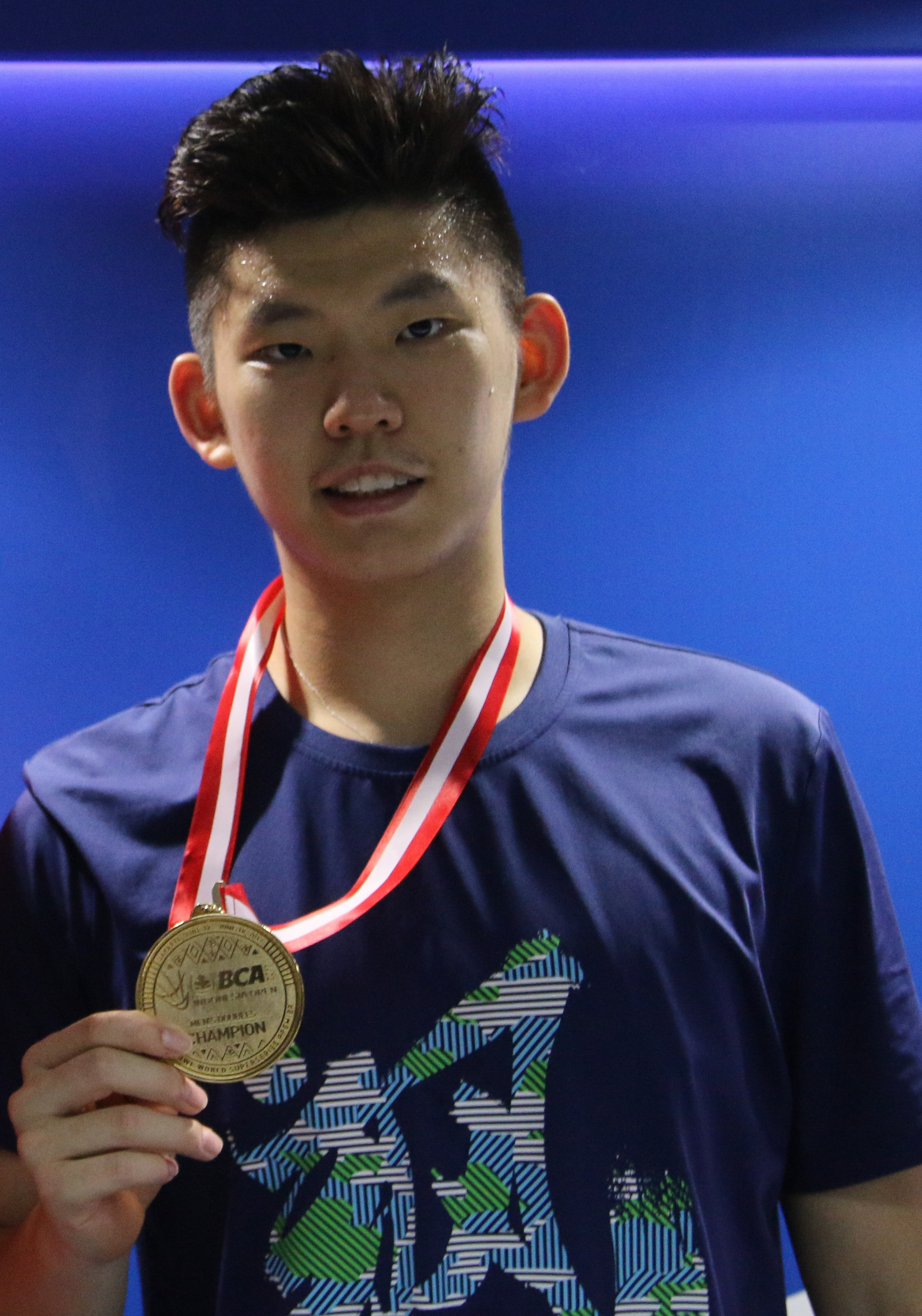
- Liu in 2017

Personal information
- Born: 25 July 1995 (age 31) Beijing, China
- Height: 1.93 m (6 ft 4 in)
- Weight: 88 kg (194 lb)
- Spouse: Huang Yaqiong (m. 2025)

Sport
- Country: China
- Sport: Badminton
- Handedness: Right
- Retired: 19 August 2024

Men's & mixed doubles
- Highest ranking: 1 (MD with Li Junhui, 6 April 2017); 2 (MD with Ou Xuanyi, 30 May 2023); 38 (XD, 27 October 2016)
- BWF profile
Medal record
Men's badminton
Representing China
Olympic Games
Silver medal – second place	2020 Tokyo	Men's doubles
World Championships
Gold medal – first place	2018 Nanjing	Men's doubles
Bronze medal – third place	2019 Basel	Men's doubles
Sudirman Cup
Gold medal – first place	2019 Nanning	Mixed team
Gold medal – first place	2023 Suzhou	Mixed team
Silver medal – second place	2017 Gold Coast	Mixed team
Thomas Cup
Gold medal – first place	2018 Bangkok	Men's team
Gold medal – first place	2024 Chengdu	Men's team
Asian Games
Gold medal – first place	2018 Jakarta–Palembang	Men's team
Gold medal – first place	2022 Hangzhou	Men's team
Bronze medal – third place	2018 Jakarta–Palembang	Men's doubles
Asian Championships
Gold medal – first place	2017 Wuhan	Men's doubles
Gold medal – first place	2018 Wuhan	Men's doubles
Silver medal – second place	2014 Gimcheon	Men's doubles
Silver medal – second place	2016 Wuhan	Men's doubles
Asia Mixed Team Championships
Bronze medal – third place	2017 Ho Chi Minh	Mixed team
World Junior Championships
Gold medal – first place	2012 Chiba	Mixed team
Gold medal – first place	2013 Bangkok	Boys' doubles
Bronze medal – third place	2012 Chiba	Boys' doubles
Bronze medal – third place	2012 Chiba	Mixed doubles
Bronze medal – third place	2013 Bangkok	Mixed doubles
Bronze medal – third place	2013 Bangkok	Mixed team
Asian Junior Championships
Gold medal – first place	2011 Lucknow	Mixed team
Gold medal – first place	2013 Kota Kinabalu	Boys' doubles
Gold medal – first place	2013 Kota Kinabalu	Mixed team
Silver medal – second place	2012 Gimcheon	Mixed team
Silver medal – second place	2013 Kota Kinabalu	Mixed doubles
Bronze medal – third place	2012 Gimcheon	Mixed doubles

Liu Yuchen (Chinese: 刘雨辰; pinyin: Liú Yǔchén, born 25 July 1995) is a Chinese badminton player. He was the men's doubles World Champion in 2018, two-time Asian Champion in 2017 and 2018, and also a silver medalist at the 2020 Summer Olympics partnered with Li Junhui. Liu was part of the national team that won the 2018 Asian Games, 2018 Thomas Cup, and 2019 Sudirman Cup. Together with Li, he achieved the men's doubles world number 1 on 6 April 2017, and occupied the top ranking for ten weeks. (Note: See also: Number one ranked players timeline.)

== Career ==
Liu competed at the 2020 Summer Olympics. Partnered with Li Junhui, he won a silver medal in the men's doubles after being defeated by Lee Yang and Wang Chi-lin of Chinese Taipei in the final in straight games, 18–21, 12–21. Following the loss, he and Li received immense backlash from Chinese netizens for being unable to win the gold medal.

In 2022, Liu started a new partnership with Ou Xuanyi after Li Junhui's retirement. In the Indonesia Open, the duo beat Korea's Choi Sol-gyu and Kim Won-ho to become the first men's doubles pair from the reserves' list to win a Super 1000 title. They qualified to compete at the World Tour Finals and emerged victorious after beating Mohammad Ahsan and Hendra Setiawan in the final.

In 2023, Liu and Ou helped the Chinese national team reach the final round of the Sudirman Cup. Facing former world no. 1 pair Takuro Hoki and Yugo Kobayashi in the semi-finals while Japan was leading the tie 2–1, Liu and Ou saved four match points being down 16–20 in the deciding set and converted their first to keep China alive in the tie. They eventually got into the final. Liu said after the match, "We didn't think too much. We played each point. We kept doing what we did towards the end. It's unbelievable." After compatriot and world no. 1 Jia Yifan won the deciding rubber, she stated, "We wouldn't be here if not for the men's doubles, they did a great job." Ultimately, the Chinese national team went on to win the 2023 Sudirman Cup.

Liu competed at the 2024 Summer Olympics, but failed to make it into the knockout tournament. Some fans and commentators have attributed Liu pair's absence from the knockout tournament to his group being ridiculously stacked compared to the other groups. In addition, Kim Astrup, whose pair was in the same group as Liu's, remarked that making it into the quarter-finals from their group deserved a medal on its own due to how loaded their group was.

On 19 August 2024, Liu announced his retirement from international badminton. His farewell party was held after the 2025 BWF World Tour Finals in Hangzhou.

== Personal life ==
His sister, Liu Jing, is a swimmer.

Liu is often jokingly called Hendra Setiawan's 'eldest son' by fans, due to his public admiration towards the elder shuttler and his closeness with Setiawan's family. Liu himself has acknowledged the joke in an Instagram post with Setiawan's family during the Indonesia Masters in Jakarta.

Liu's father is the coach of the Beijing Municipal women's Badminton team. His mother has also coached the Beijing badminton team.

On 2 August 2024, Liu proposed to his girlfriend, fellow Chinese badminton player and 2020 Olympic silver medalist Huang Yaqiong, right after she received her gold medal at the 2024 Summer Olympics in Adidas Arena, Paris, which she accepted. One year after the proposal, the couple shared on Weibo that they had registered their marriage.

== Achievements ==
=== Olympic Games ===
Men's doubles
Year	Venue	Partner	Opponent	Score	Result	Ref.
2020	Musashino Forest Sport Plaza; Tokyo, Japan	(China) Li Junhui	(Chinese Taipei) Lee Yang (Chinese Taipei) Wang Chi-lin	18–21, 12–21	Silver	

=== BWF World Championships ===
Men's doubles
Year	Venue	Partner	Opponent	Score	Result	Ref.
2018	Nanjing Youth Olympic Sports Park; Nanjing, China	(China) Li Junhui	(Japan) Takeshi Kamura (Japan) Keigo Sonoda	21–12, 21–19	Gold	
2019	St. Jakobshalle; Basel, Switzerland	(China) Li Junhui	(Japan) Takuro Hoki (Japan) Yugo Kobayashi	19–21, 13–21	Bronze	.

=== Asian Games ===
Men's doubles
Year	Venue	Partner	Opponent	Score	Result	Ref.
2018	Istora Gelora Bung Karno; Jakarta, Indonesia	(China) Li Junhui	(Indonesia) Fajar Alfian (Indonesia) Muhammad Rian Ardianto	14–21, 21–19, 13–21	Bronze	

=== Asian Championships ===
Men's doubles
Year	Venue	Partner	Opponent	Score	Result	Ref.
2014	Gimcheon Indoor Stadium; Gimcheon, South Korea	(China) Li Junhui	(South Korea) Shin Baek-cheol (South Korea) Yoo Yeon-seong	20–22, 17–21	Silver	
2016	Wuhan Sports Center Gymnasium; Wuhan, China	(China) Li Junhui	(South Korea) Lee Yong-dae (South Korea) Yoo Yeon-seong	14–21, 26–28	Silver	
2017	Wuhan Sports Center Gymnasium; Wuhan, China	(China) Li Junhui	(China) Huang Kaixiang (China) Wang Yilyu	21–14, 21–12	Gold	
2018	Wuhan Sports Center Gymnasium; Wuhan, China	(China) Li Junhui	(Japan) Takeshi Kamura (Japan) Keigo Sonoda	11–21, 21–10, 21–13	Gold	

=== BWF World Junior Championships ===
Boys' doubles
Year	Venue	Partner	Opponent	Score	Result	Ref.
2012	Chiba Port Arena; Chiba, Japan	(China) Wang Yilyu	(Hong Kong) Lee Chun Hei (Hong Kong) Ng Ka Long	10–21, 11–21	Bronze	
2013	Hua Mark Indoor Stadium; Bangkok, Thailand	(China) Li Junhui	(China) Huang Kaixiang (China) Zheng Siwei	14–21, 21–13, 22–20	Gold	

Mixed doubles
Year	Venue	Partner	Opponent	Score	Result	Ref.
2012	Chiba Port Arena; Chiba, Japan	(China) Chen Qingchen	(Indonesia) Edi Subaktiar (Indonesia) Melati Daeva Oktavianti	21–14, 18–21, 11–21	Bronze	
2013	Hua Mark Indoor Stadium; Bangkok, Thailand	(China) Huang Dongping	(Indonesia) Kevin Sanjaya Sukamuljo (Indonesia) Masita Mahmudin	21–6, 17–21, 19–21	Bronze	

=== Asian Junior Championships ===
Boys' doubles
Year	Venue	Partner	Opponent	Score	Result	Ref.
2013	Likas Indoor Stadium; Kota Kinabalu, Malaysia	(China) Li Junhui	(China) Huang Kaixiang (China) Zheng Siwei	21–15, 21–14	Gold	

Mixed doubles
Year	Venue	Partner	Opponent	Score	Result	Ref.
2012	Gimcheon Indoor Stadium; Gimcheon, South Korea	(China) Chen Qingchen	(South Korea) Choi Sol-gyu (South Korea) Chae Yoo-jung	17–21, 19–21	Bronze	
2013	Likas Indoor Stadium; Kota Kinabalu, Malaysia	(China) Huang Dongping	(South Korea) Choi Sol-gyu (South Korea) Chae Yoo-jung	11–21, 21–19, 13–21	Silver	

=== BWF World Tour (7 titles, 7 runners-up) ===
The BWF World Tour, which was announced on 19 March 2017, and implemented in 2018, is a series of elite badminton tournaments sanctioned by the Badminton World Federation (BWF). The BWF World Tour is divided into levels of World Tour Finals, Super 1000, Super 750, Super 500, Super 300, and the BWF Tour Super 100.

Men's doubles
Year	Tournament	Level	Partner	Opponent	Score	Result
2018	Indonesia Masters	Super 500	(China) Li Junhui	(Indonesia) Marcus Fernaldi Gideon (Indonesia) Kevin Sanjaya Sukamuljo	21–11, 10–21, 16–21	(silver) Runner-up
2018	Japan Open	Super 750	(China) Li Junhui	(Indonesia) Marcus Fernaldi Gideon (Indonesia) Kevin Sanjaya Sukamuljo	11–21, 13–21	(silver) Runner-up
2018	BWF World Tour Finals	World Tour Finals	(China) Li Junhui	(Japan) Hiroyuki Endo (Japan) Yuta Watanabe	21–15, 21–11	(gold) Winner
2019	Malaysia Open	Super 750	(China) Li Junhui	(Japan) Takeshi Kamura (Japan) Keigo Sonoda	21–12, 21–17	(gold) Winner
2019	Thailand Open	Super 500	(China) Li Junhui	(India) Satwiksairaj Rankireddy (India) Chirag Shetty	19–21, 21–18, 18–21	(silver) Runner-up
2019	Macau Open	Super 300	(China) Li Junhui	(China) Huang Kaixiang (China) Liu Cheng	21–8, 18–21, 22–20	(gold) Winner
2020	Malaysia Masters	Super 500	(China) Li Junhui	(South Korea) Kim Gi-jung (South Korea) Lee Yong-dae	14–21, 16–21	(silver) Runner-up
2022	German Open	Super 300	(China) Ou Xuanyi	(Malaysia) Goh Sze Fei (Malaysia) Nur Izzuddin	21–23, 21–16, 14–21	(silver) Runner-up
2022	Korea Masters	Super 300	(China) Ou Xuanyi	(South Korea) Kim Gi-jung (South Korea) Kim Sa-rang	14–21, 16–21	(silver) Runner-up
2022	Indonesia Open	Super 1000	(China) Ou Xuanyi	(South Korea) Choi Sol-gyu (South Korea) Kim Won-ho	21–17, 23–21	(gold) Winner
2022	Australian Open	Super 300	(China) Ou Xuanyi	(Malaysia) Ong Yew Sin (Malaysia) Teo Ee Yi	21–16, 22–20	(gold) Winner
2022	BWF World Tour Finals	World Tour Finals	(China) Ou Xuanyi	(Indonesia) Mohammad Ahsan (Indonesia) Hendra Setiawan	21–17, 19–21, 21–12	(gold) Winner
2023	Hylo Open	Super 300	(China) Ou Xuanyi	(Chinese Taipei) Lee Yang (Chinese Taipei) Wang Chi-lin	24–22, 21–13	(gold) Winner
2023	Japan Masters	Super 500	(China) Ou Xuanyi	(China) He Jiting (China) Ren Xiangyu	14–21, 21–15, 15–21	(silver) Runner-up

=== BWF Superseries (2 titles, 3 runners-up) ===
The BWF Superseries, which was launched on 14 December 2006, and implemented in 2007, was a series of elite badminton tournaments, sanctioned by the Badminton World Federation (BWF). BWF Superseries levels were Superseries and Superseries Premier. A season of Superseries consisted of twelve tournaments around the world that had been introduced since 2011. Successful players were invited to the Superseries Finals, which were held at the end of each year.

Men's doubles
Year	Tournament	Partner	Opponent	Score	Result
2016	Japan Open	(China) Li Junhui	(South Korea) Kim Gi-jung (South Korea) Ko Sung-hyun	21–12, 21–12	(gold) Winner
2016	Korea Open	(China) Li Junhui	(South Korea) Lee Yong-dae (South Korea) Yoo Yeon-seong	21–15, 20–22, 18–21	(silver) Runner-up
2017	All England Open	(China) Li Junhui	(Indonesia) Marcus Fernaldi Gideon (Indonesia) Kevin Sanjaya Sukamuljo	19–21, 14–21	(silver) Runner-up
2017	Singapore Open	(China) Li Junhui	(Denmark) Mathias Boe (Denmark) Carsten Mogensen	13–21, 14–21	(silver) Runner-up
2017	Indonesia Open	(China) Li Junhui	(Denmark) Mathias Boe (Denmark) Carsten Mogensen	21–19, 19–21, 21–18	(gold) Winner

BWF Super Series Finals tournament
BWF Super Series Premier tournament
BWF Super Series tournament

=== BWF Grand Prix (7 titles, 2 runners-up) ===
The BWF Grand Prix had two levels, the Grand Prix and Grand Prix Gold. It was a series of badminton tournaments sanctioned by the Badminton World Federation (BWF) and played between 2007 and 2017.

Men's doubles
Year	Tournament	Partner	Opponent	Score	Result
2013	New Zealand Open	(China) Li Junhui	(Indonesia) Angga Pratama (Indonesia) Rian Agung Saputro	6–21, 20–22	(silver) Runner-up
2014	India Grand Prix Gold	(China) Li Junhui	(China) Huang Kaixiang (China) Zheng Siwei	21–17, 19–21, 22–20	(gold) Winner
2014	Chinese Taipei Open	(China) Li Junhui	(Indonesia) Andrei Adistia (Indonesia) Hendra Aprida Gunawan	14–21, 21–16, 16–21	(silver) Runner-up
2015	China Masters	(China) Li Junhui	(China) Wang Yilyu (China) Zhang Wen	21–15, 19–21, 21–12	(gold) Winner
2015	U.S. Open	(China) Li Junhui	(India) Manu Attri (India) B. Sumeeth Reddy	21–12, 21–16	(gold) Winner
2015	Canada Open	(China) Li Junhui	(China) Huang Kaixiang (China) Wang Sijie	17–21, 21–12, 21–18	(gold) Winner
2015	Vietnam Open	(China) Li Junhui	(China) Huang Kaixiang (China) Wang Sijie	21–8, 21–16	(gold) Winner
2016	Chinese Taipei Open	(China) Li Junhui	(Chinese Taipei) Chen Hung-ling (Chinese Taipei) Wang Chi-lin	21–17, 17–21, 24–22	(gold) Winner

Mixed doubles
Year	Tournament	Partner	Opponent	Score	Result
2014	Chinese Taipei Open	(China) Yu Xiaohan	(Indonesia) Alfian Eko Prasetya (Indonesia) Annisa Saufika	21–16, 21–18	(gold) Winner

BWF Grand Prix Gold tournament
BWF Grand Prix tournament

=== BWF International Challenge/Series (3 runners-up) ===
Men's doubles
Year	Tournament	Partner	Opponent	Score	Result	Ref.
2015	China International	(China) Li Junhui	(China) Wang Yilyu (China) Zhang Wen	10–21, 20–22	(silver) Runner-up	

Mixed doubles
Year	Tournament	Partner	Opponent	Score	Result	Ref.
2015	China International	(China) Yu Xiaohan	(China) Zheng Siwei (China) Chen Qingchen	21–15, 12–21, 13–21	(silver) Runner-up	
2015	Osaka International	(China) Huang Dongping	(South Korea) Kim Duck-young (South Korea) Eom Hye-won	17–21, 21–16, 17–21	(silver) Runner-up	

BWF International Challenge tournament
BWF International Series tournament
