= Hui Xirui =

Chinese badminton player (born 1994)

Hui Xirui 惠夕蕊
Personal information
- Born: 4 January 1994 (age 32) Jiangsu, China

Sport
- Country: China
- Sport: Badminton

Women's Singles
- Highest ranking: 36 (19 Jun 2014)
- Current ranking: 175 (20 Oct 2016)
- BWF profile
Medal record
Badminton
Representing China
Summer Universiade
Silver medal – second place	2015 Gwangju	Mixed team
Asia Junior Championships
Gold medal – first place	2011 Lucknow	Mixed team
Bronze medal – third place	2011 Lucknow	Girls' singles

Hui Xirui (Chinese: 惠夕蕊, born 4 January 1994) is a Chinese female badminton player.

== Achievements ==
=== Asia Junior Championships ===
Girls' Singles
Year	Venue	Opponent	Score	Result
2011	Babu Banarasi Das Indoor Stadium; Lucknow, India	(China) Shen Yaying	21-23, 17–21	Bronze

=== BWF Grand Prix ===
The BWF Grand Prix has two level such as Grand Prix and Grand Prix Gold. It is a series of badminton tournaments, sanctioned by Badminton World Federation (BWF) since 2007.

Women's Singles
Year	Tournament	Opponent	Score	Result
2015	China Masters	(China) He Bingjiao	13-21, 9–21	(silver) Runner-up

BWF Grand Prix Gold tournament
BWF Grand Prix tournament

=== BWF International Challenge/Series ===
Women's Singles
Year	Tournament	Opponent	Score	Result
2014	China International	(China) Liu Xin	15-21, 17–21	(silver) Runner-up
2016	China International	(China) Gao Fangjie	21-11, 19-21, 21–17	(gold) Winner
2017	Smiling Fish International	(Japan) Natsuki Nidaira	21-10, 15-21, 21–19	(gold) Winner

BWF International Challenge tournament
BWF International Series tournament
BWF Future Series tournament
