= Kang Jun =

Chinese badminton player

Kang Jun 康骏
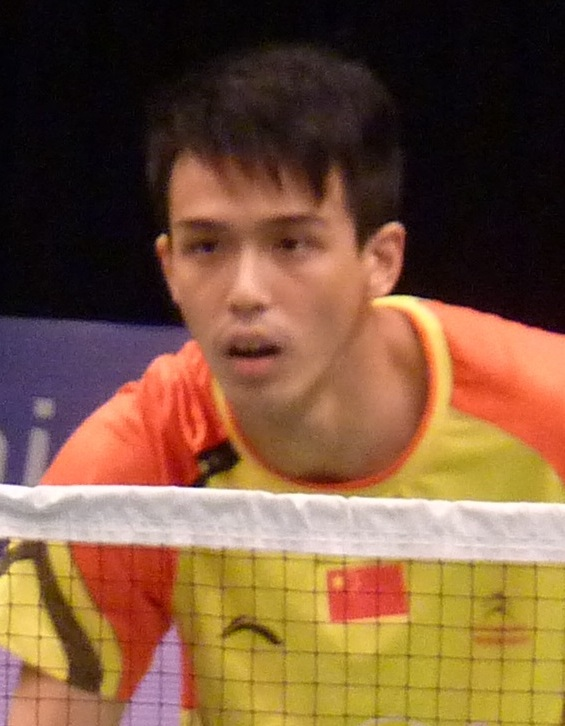
- Kang at the 2013 Dutch Open Grand Prix

Personal information
- Born: 2 March 1990 (age 36) Jiangsu, China

Sport
- Country: China
- Sport: Badminton
- Handedness: Right

Men's & mixed doubles
- Highest ranking: 20 (MD 12 June 2014); 93 (XD 21 November 2013)
- BWF profile

Kang Jun (Chinese: 康骏; pinyin: Kāng Jùn; born 2 March 1990) is a Chinese badminton player. In 2013, he reach the semi-final round at the Japan Open partnered with Liu Cheng. In 2014, he and Liu won the China Masters Grand Prix Gold tournament.

== Achievements ==
=== BWF Grand Prix ===
The BWF Grand Prix had two levels, the Grand Prix and Grand Prix Gold. It was a series of badminton tournaments sanctioned by the Badminton World Federation (BWF) and played between 2007 and 2017.

Men's doubles
Year	Tournament	Partner	Opponent	Score	Result
2014	China Masters	(China) Liu Cheng	(China) Wang Yilyu (China) Zhang Wen	21–13, 21–16	(gold) Winner

BWF Grand Prix Gold tournament
BWF Grand Prix tournament

=== BWF International Challenge/Series ===
Men's doubles
Year	Tournament	Partner	Opponent	Score	Result
2017	Smiling Fish International	(China) Zhang Sijie	(Malaysia) Nur Mohd Azriyn Ayub (Malaysia) Jagdish Singh	21–15, 21–15	(gold) Winner

BWF International Challenge tournament
BWF International Series tournament
