= China International Challenge =

The China International Challenge is an open international badminton tournament in China organised by the Chinese Badminton Association, sanctioned by the Badminton World Federation and Badminton Asia. Previously it was known as China Asia Satellite in 2001 and China International Challenge in 2014–2017. This tournament established since 2001, and has been an International Challenge level since 2014. In 2023, China International Challenge would be held again since the last time in 2017.

== Previous winners ==
Year	Men's singles	Women's singles	Men's doubles	Women's doubles	Mixed doubles
2001	(China) Guo Jianhua	(China) Zhang Lu	(China) Ge Cheng (China) Tao Xiaoqiang	(China) Chen Xiaoli (China) Zhang Yawen	(China) Tao Xiaolan (China) Tao Xiaoqiang
2002– 2013	No competition				
2014	(Hong Kong) Ng Ka Long	(China) Liu Xin	(China) Wang Yilyu (China) Zhang Wen	(China) Luo Ying (China) Luo Yu	(China) Wang Yilyu (China) Ou Dongni
2015	(China) Qiao Bin	(Japan) Nozomi Okuhara	(China) Wang Yilyu (China) Zhang Wen	(China) Ou Dongni (China) Yu Xiaohan	(China) Zheng Siwei (China) Chen Qingchen
2016	(China) Lin Guipu	(China) Hui Xirui	(China) Wang Yilyu (China) Zhang Wen	(China) Chen Qingchen (China) Jia Yifan	(China) Wang Sijie (China) Chen Lu
2017	(China) Sun Feixiang	(China) Cai Yanyan	(Indonesia) Mohammad Ahsan (Indonesia) Rian Agung Saputro	(China) Du Yue (China) Xu Ya	(Japan) Tomoya Takashina (Japan) Rie Eto
2018– 2022	No competition				
2023	(China) Lei Lanxi	(China) Chen Lu	(China) Chen Xujun (China) Peng Jianqin	(China) Xia Yuting (China) Zhou Xinru	(China) Cheng Xing (China) Chen Fanghui
2024	No competition				
2025	Cancelled (Note: This tournament, originally to be played on 28 October–2 November, was later cancelled.)				
2026	(China) Sun Chao	(China) Chen Xintong	(China) Chen Junting (China) Huang Di	(China) Liu Jiayue (China) Wang Zimeng	(China) Liao Pinyi (China) Zhang Jiahan

== Performances by nation ==
As of the 2026 edition

Pos	Nation	MS	WS	MD	WD	XD	Total
1	China*	6	6	6	7	6	31
2	Japan		1			1	2
3	Hong Kong	1					1
3	Indonesia			1			1
Total		7	7	7	7	7	35

* Host nation
