= Gao Tianyu =

Chinese footballer

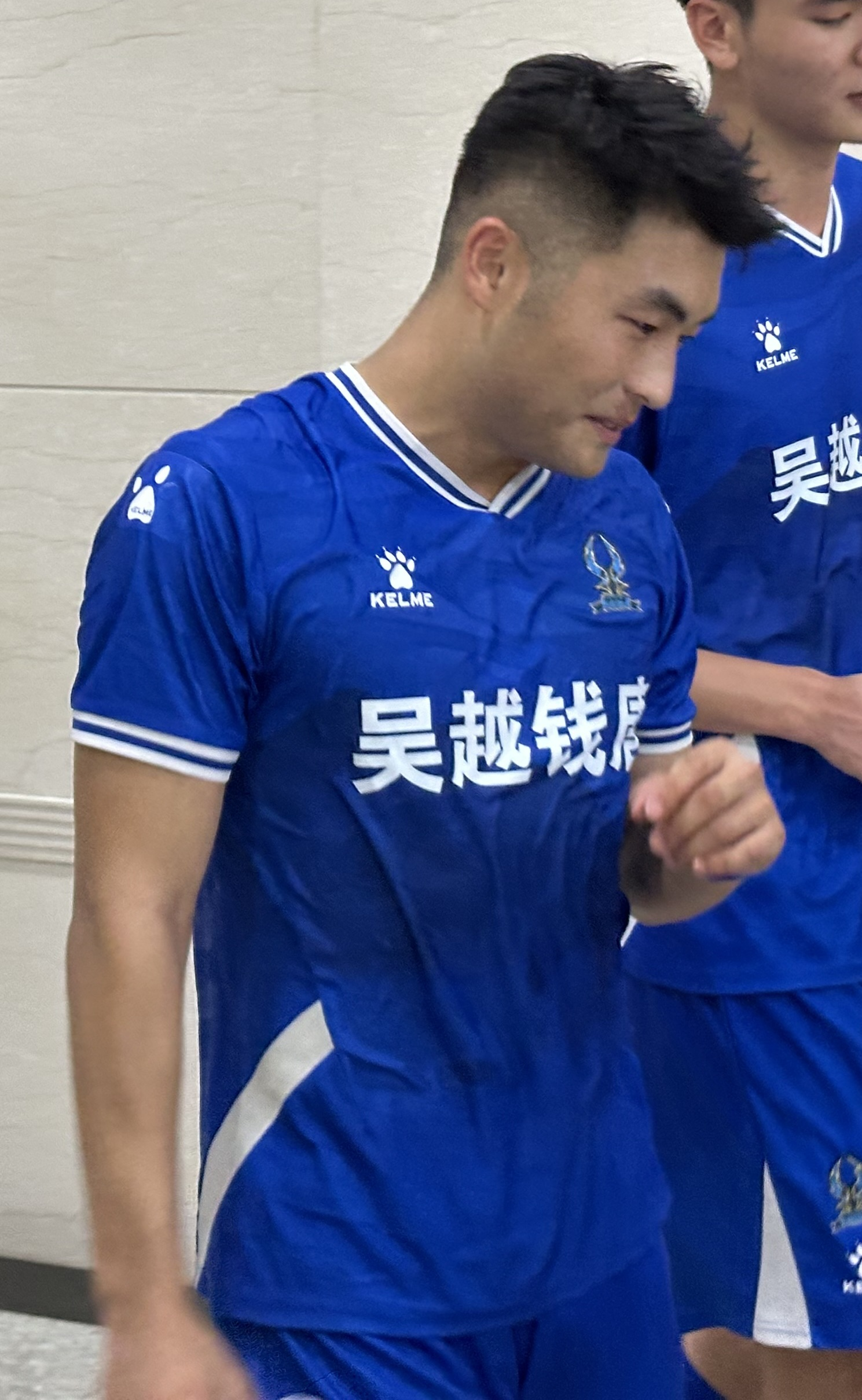
- Gao Tianyu in June 2025

Personal information
- Date of birth: 20 January 2001 (age 25)
- Place of birth: Baoji, Shaanxi, China
- Height: 1.74 m (5 ft 9 in)
- Positions: Winger; right-back

Team information
- Current team: Hangzhou Linping Wuyue
- Number: 7

Youth career
- –2019: Zhejiang Greentown

Senior career*
Years	Team	Apps	(Gls)
2019–2020	Iwate Grulla Morioka	1	(0)
2021–2025	Zhejiang FC	24	(0)
2023	→ Henan FC (loan)	21	(0)
2024	→ Qingdao West Coast (loan)	1	(0)
2024	→ Shaanxi Union (loan)	13	(0)
2025	→ Hangzhou Linping Wuyue (loan)	25	(1)
2026–	Hangzhou Linping Wuyue	0	(0)

International career^{‡}
2019	China U18	3	(0)
- * Club domestic league appearances and goals as of 22:14, 8 March 2026 (UTC) ‡ National team caps and goals as of 14:01, 28 June 2020 (UTC)

Gao Tianyu (Chinese: 高天语; born 20 January 2001) is a Chinese professional footballer who plays as a winger or right-back for China League Two club Hangzhou Linping Wuyue.

== Club career ==
Gao Tianyu would play for the Zhejiang FC youth team before joining third tier Japanese football club Iwate Grulla Morioka. He would go on to be promoted to their senior team where he made his professional debut in a league game on 1 December 2019 against Thespakusatsu Gunma in a 1-0 defeat. This would be his only appearance for the club after they allowed him to leave once his contract expired, which saw Gao return to Zhejiang. He would make his debut in a league game against Suzhou Dongwu on 29 September 2021, in a game that ended in a 3-0 victory. He would then go on to establish himself as a regular as the club gained promotion to the top tier at the end of the 2021 campaign.

== Career statistics ==
As of 31 January 2023.

Club	Season	League			National Cup		Continental		Other		Total	
Club	Season	Division	Apps	Goals	Apps	Goals	Apps	Goals	Apps	Goals	Apps	Goals
Iwate Grulla Morioka	2019	J3 League	1	0	0	0	–		–		1	0
Iwate Grulla Morioka	2020	J3 League	0	0	0	0	–		–		0	0
Iwate Grulla Morioka	Total		1	0	0	0	0	0	0	0	1	0
Zhejiang FC	2021	China League One	10	0	1	0	–		2 (Note: Appearance(s) in CSL Relegation play-offs)	0	13	0
Zhejiang FC	2022	Chinese Super League	14	0	2	0	–		–		16	0
Zhejiang FC	total		24	0	3	0	0	0	2	0	29	0
Career total			25	0	3	0	0	0	2	0	30	0
