= China Masters =

Annual badminton tournament in China

- Official website
- Founded: 2005; 21 years ago
- Editions: 19 (2026)
- Location: Shenzhen (2026); China
- Venue: Shenzhen Arena (2026)
- Prize money: US$1,250,000 (2026)

Men's
- Draw: 32S / 32D
- Current champions: Jason Gunawan (singles); Satwiksairaj Rankireddy; Chirag Shetty (doubles)
- Most singles titles: 6 Lin Dan
- Most doubles titles: 3 Lee Yong-dae

Women's
- Draw: 32S / 32D
- Current champions: An Se-young (singles); Sumire Nakade; Miyu Takahashi (doubles)
- Most singles titles: 3 Chen Yufei; An Se-young
- Most doubles titles: 4 Yu Yang

Mixed doubles
- Draw: 32
- Current champions: Feng Yanzhe; Huang Dongping
- Most titles (male): 3 Xu Chen
- Most titles (female): 4 Huang Dongping

Super 750
- China Masters; Denmark Open; French Open; India Open; Japan Open; Singapore Open

Last completed
- 2026 China Masters

The China Masters (Chinese: 中国羽毛球大师赛, formerly known as Fuzhou China Open) is an annual badminton tournament held in China. It became part of the BWF Super Series tournaments in 2007. Following the restructurisation to BWF World Tour, since 2018 it became one of only six tournaments to be granted Super 750 level and was renamed as Fuzhou China Open. From 2023 onwards, the tournament is held in Shenzhen, and its name is changed back to its former name, China Masters.

== Locations ==
Five cities have been chosen to host the tournament.

- 2005: Beijing
- 2006–2007: Chengdu
- 2008–2017: Changzhou
- 2018–2019: Fuzhou
- 2023–present: Shenzhen
Locations of China Open host cities

== Past winners ==
Year	Men's singles	Women's singles	Men's doubles	Women's doubles	Mixed doubles	Ref
2005	(China) Lin Dan	(China) Zhang Ning	(China) Guo Zhendong (China) Xie Zhongbo	(China) Du Jing (China) Yu Yang	(China) Zhang Jun (China) Gao Ling	
2006	(China) Chen Jin	(China) Wang Lin	(Denmark) Jens Eriksen (Denmark) Martin Lundgaard Hansen	(China) Gao Ling (China) Huang Sui	(China) Xie Zhongbo (China) Zhang Yawen	
2007	(China) Lin Dan	(China) Xie Xingfang	(China) Cai Yun (China) Fu Haifeng	(Indonesia) Vita Marissa (Indonesia) Liliyana Natsir	(China) Zheng Bo (China) Gao Ling	
2008	(Indonesia) Sony Dwi Kuncoro	(Hong Kong) Zhou Mi	(Indonesia) Markis Kido (Indonesia) Hendra Setiawan	(China) Cheng Shu (China) Zhao Yunlei	(China) Xie Zhongbo (China) Zhang Yawen	
2009	(China) Lin Dan	(China) Wang Shixian	(China) Guo Zhendong (China) Xu Chen	(China) Du Jing (China) Yu Yang	(China) Tao Jiaming (China) Wang Xiaoli	
2010	(China) Lin Dan	(China) Wang Xin	(China) Cai Yun (China) Fu Haifeng	(China) Wang Xiaoli (China) Yu Yang	(China) Tao Jiaming (China) Tian Qing	
2011	(China) Chen Long	(China) Wang Shixian	(South Korea) Jung Jae-sung (South Korea) Lee Yong-dae	(China) Tang Jinhua (China) Xia Huan	(China) Xu Chen (China) Ma Jin	
2012	(China) Chen Long	(China) Wang Yihan	(China) Chai Biao (China) Zhang Nan	(China) Bao Yixin (China) Zhong Qianxin	(China) Xu Chen (China) Ma Jin	
2013	(China) Wang Zhengming	(China) Liu Xin	(South Korea) Ko Sung-hyun (South Korea) Lee Yong-dae	(China) Wang Xiaoli (China) Yu Yang	(China) Zhang Nan (China) Zhao Yunlei	
2014	(China) Lin Dan	(China) Liu Xin	(China) Kang Jun (China) Liu Cheng	(China) Luo Ying (China) Luo Yu	(China) Lu Kai (China) Huang Yaqiong	
2015	(China) Wang Zhengming	(China) He Bingjiao	(China) Li Junhui (China) Liu Yuchen	(China) Tang Jinhua (China) Zhong Qianxin	(China) Liu Cheng (China) Bao Yixin	
2016	(China) Lin Dan	(China) Li Xuerui	(South Korea) Lee Yong-dae (South Korea) Yoo Yeon-seong	(China) Luo Ying (China) Luo Yu	(China) Xu Chen (China) Ma Jin	
2017	(China) Tian Houwei	(Japan) Aya Ohori	(Chinese Taipei) Chen Hung-ling (Chinese Taipei) Wang Chi-lin	(China) Bao Yixin (China) Yu Xiaohan	(China) Wang Yilyu (China) Huang Dongping	
2018	(Japan) Kento Momota	(China) Chen Yufei	(Indonesia) Marcus Fernaldi Gideon (Indonesia) Kevin Sanjaya Sukamuljo	(South Korea) Lee So-hee (South Korea) Shin Seung-chan	(China) Zheng Siwei (China) Huang Yaqiong	
2019	(Japan) Kento Momota	(China) Chen Yufei	(Indonesia) Marcus Fernaldi Gideon (Indonesia) Kevin Sanjaya Sukamuljo	(Japan) Yuki Fukushima (Japan) Sayaka Hirota	(China) Wang Yilyu (China) Huang Dongping	
2020	Cancelled (Note: This tournament, originally to be played from 3 to 8 November, was later cancelled due to the COVID-19 pandemic in mainland China.)					
2021	Cancelled (Note: This tournament was cancelled due to the COVID-19 pandemic on 28 June 2021.)					
2022	Cancelled (Note: This tournament, originally to be played on 29 November – 4 December, was later cancelled due to the COVID-19 pandemic in mainland China.)					
2023	(Japan) Kodai Naraoka	(China) Chen Yufei	(China) Liang Weikeng (China) Wang Chang	(Japan) Nami Matsuyama (Japan) Chiharu Shida	(China) Zheng Siwei (China) Huang Yaqiong	
2024	(Denmark) Anders Antonsen	(South Korea) An Se-young	(South Korea) Jin Yong (South Korea) Seo Seung-jae	(China) Liu Shengshu (China) Tan Ning	(China) Feng Yanzhe (China) Huang Dongping	
2025	(China) Weng Hongyang	(South Korea) An Se-young	(South Korea) Kim Won-ho (South Korea) Seo Seung-jae	(China) Jia Yifan (China) Zhang Shuxian	(Thailand) Dechapol Puavaranukroh (Thailand) Supissara Paewsampran	
2026	(Hong Kong) Jason Gunawan	(South Korea) An Se-young	(India) Satwiksairaj Rankireddy (India) Chirag Shetty	(Japan) Sumire Nakade (Japan) Miyu Takahashi	(China) Feng Yanzhe (China) Huang Dongping	

== Performances by nation ==
As of the 2026 edition

Pos	Nation	MS	WS	MD	WD	XD	Total
1	China*	13	14	8	14	18	67
2	South Korea		3	5	1		9
3	Japan	3	1		3		7
4	Indonesia	1		3	1		5
5	Denmark	1		1			2
5	Hong Kong	1	1				2
7	Chinese Taipei			1			1
7	India			1			1
7	Thailand					1	1
Total		19	19	19	19	19	95

* Host nation
