= 2015 U.S. Open Grand Prix =

Tournament details
- Dates: December 7, 2015 - December 12, 2015
- Level: Grand Prix
- Total prize money: US$50,000
- Venue: Orange County Badminton Club
- Location: Orange, California, United States

Champions
- Men's singles: (South Korea) Lee Hyun-il
- Women's singles: (Chinese Taipei) Pai Yu-po
- Men's doubles: (Malaysia) Goh V Shem (Malaysia) Tan Wee Kiong
- Women's doubles: (South Korea) Jung Kyung-eun (South Korea) Shin Seung-chan
- Mixed doubles: (South Korea) Choi Sol-gyu (South Korea) Eom Hye-won

The 2015 U.S. Open Grand Prix was the twenty-first grand prix gold and grand prix tournament of the 2015 BWF Grand Prix Gold and Grand Prix. The tournament was held in Orange County Badminton Club, Orange, United States, from December 7 until December 12, 2015, and had a total purse of $50,000.

== Men's singles ==
=== Seeds ===
1. (South Korea) Lee Hyun-il (champion)
2. (England) Rajiv Ouseph (final)
3. (Japan) Sho Sasaki (first round)
4. (Chinese Taipei) Hsu Jen-hao (semifinals)
5. (Thailand) Tanongsak Saensomboonsuk (second round)
6. (South Korea) Lee Dong-keun (third round)
7. (Thailand) Boonsak Ponsana (semifinals)
8. (Spain) Pablo Abian (quarterfinals)
9. (Malaysia) Zulfadli Zulkiffli (second round)
10. (Vietnam) Nguyen Tien Minh (first round)
11. (Japan) Kenichi Tago (withdrawn)
12. (Israel) Misha Zilberman (third round)
13. (Guatemala) Kevin Cordón (third round)
14. (Austria) Luka Wraber (second round)
15. (Austria) David Obernosterer (third round)
16. (Cuba) Osleni Guerrero (withdrawn)

=== Finals ===
Quarterfinals
1 | (South Korea) Lee Hyun-il | 22 | 21
(Sweden) Henri Hurskainen | 20 | 17
4 | (Chinese Taipei) Hsu Jen-hao | 22 | 21
8 | (Spain) Pablo Abian | 20 | 17
7 | (Thailand) Boonsak Ponsana | 21 | 24
(Chinese Taipei) Cheng Po-wei | 17 | 22
(Japan) Kanta Tsuneyama | 13 | 12
2 | (England) Rajiv Ouseph | 21 | 21

Semifinals
1 | (South Korea) Lee Hyun-il | 21 | 21
4 | (Chinese Taipei) Hsu Jen-hao | 13 | 14
7 | (Thailand) Boonsak Ponsana | 18 | 13
2 | (England) Rajiv Ouseph | 21 | 21

Final
1 | (South Korea) Lee Hyun-il | 21 | 21
2 | (England) Rajiv Ouseph | 19 | 12

=== Top half ===
==== Section 1 ====
First round
1 | (South Korea) Lee H-i | 21 | 21
Q6 | (United States) T Lam | 14 | 12
(Portugal) P Martins | 21 | 13
(Iceland) K Gunnarsson | 6 | 8^{r}
15 | (Austria) D Obernosterer | 21 | 21
Q7 | (Canada) P-E Pilote | 15 | 8
(Malaysia) Zh Zulkiffli | 17 | 21 | 21
Q4 | (Canada) P-A Dostie-Guidon | 21 | 14 | 8

Second round
1 | (South Korea) Lee H-i | 21 | 21
(Portugal) P Martins | 12 | 8
15 | (Austria) D Obernosterer | 21 | 21
(Malaysia) Zh Zulkiffli | 18 | 11

Third round
1 | (South Korea) Lee H-i | 21 | 21
15 | (Austria) D Obernosterer | 14 | 15

==== Section 2 ====
First round
5 | (Thailand) T Saensomboonsuk | 13 | 21 | 21
(Mexico) A Hernández | 21 | 11 | 10
(Czech Republic) P Koukal | 16 | 19
(Sweden) H Hurskainen | 21 | 21
12 | (Israel) M Zilberman | 21 | 21
Q8 | (United States) H L Lee | 19 | 12
(Mexico) L R Garrido | 21 | 14 | 20
(Denmark) J Persson | 17 | 21 | 22

Second round
5 | (Thailand) T Saensomboonsuk | 11^{r}
(Sweden) H Hurskainen | 13
12 | (Israel) M Zilberman | 21 | 21
(Denmark) J Persson | 19 | 11

Third round
(Sweden) H Hurskainen | 14 | 21 | 21
12 | (Israel) M Zilberman | 21 | 12 | 16

==== Section 3 ====
First round
4 | (Chinese Taipei) Hsu J-h | 21 | 21
(Vietnam) Pham C C | 16 | 15
(Finland) V Lang | w | / | o
(Guatemala) R Ramírez
PFQ | (Australia) C Chen | 17 | 14
(Denmark) R Fladberg | 21 | 21
(Canada) T Chiu | 15 | 14
(Chinese Taipei) Hsu J-t | 21 | 21

Second round
4 | (Chinese Taipei) Hsu J-h | 21 | 21
(Finland) V Lang | 18 | 12
(Denmark) R Fladberg | 17 | 21 | 21
(Chinese Taipei) Hsu J-t | 21 | 19 | 17

Third round
4 | (Chinese Taipei) Hsu J-h | 21 | 21
(Denmark) R Fladberg | 19 | 18

==== Section 4 ====
First round
8 | (Spain) P Abian | 21 | 21
(Lithuania) K Navickas | 18 | 15
(Chinese Taipei) Yu J-c | 21 | 16 | 21
(Slovakia) J Vicen | 15 | 21 | 16
PFQ | (Chinese Taipei) Kan C-y | 21 | 16 | 15
Q5 | (Japan) K Watanabe | 19 | 21 | 21
(Thailand) P Thongnuam | 21 | 21
(Sri Lanka) D Karunaratna | 17 | 14

Second round
8 | (Spain) P Abian | 21 | 21
(Chinese Taipei) Yu J-c | 18 | 13
Q5 | (Japan) K Watanabe | 21 | 21
(Thailand) P Thongnuam | 10 | 6

Third round
8 | (Spain) P Abian | 21 | 22
Q5 | (Japan) K Watanabe | 14 | 20

=== Bottom half ===
==== Section 5 ====
First round
(United States) B Seguin | 9 | 8
(Denmark) C L Thomsen | 21 | 21
(Mexico) L Munoz | 15 | 15
15 | (Guatemala) K Cordón | 21 | 21
(Canada) L Couture | 11 | 17
(Ukraine) A Pochtarov | 21 | 21
(Sri Lanka) N Karunaratne | 14 | 5
7 | (Thailand) B Ponsana | 21 | 21

Second round
(Denmark) C L Thomsen | 20 | 18
13 | (Guatemala) K Cordón | 22 | 21
(Ukraine) A Pochtarov | 17 | 8
7 | (Thailand) B Ponsana | 21 | 21

Third round
13 | (Guatemala) K Cordón | 15 | 9
7 | (Thailand) B Ponsana | 21 | 21

==== Section 6 ====
First round
(Czech Republic) M Ludík | 11 | 26 | 18
Q2 | (Japan) K Naraoka | 21 | 24 | 21
Q3 | (Guatemala) R Castellanos | 5 | 11
14 | (Austria) L Wraber | 21 | 21
(Belgium) Y Tan | 14 | 21
(Chinese Taipei) Cheng P-w | 21 | 23
(Chinese Taipei) Yang C-h | 21 | 21
3 | (Japan) S Sasaki | 15 | 14

Second round
Q2 | (Japan) K Naraoka | 21 | 21
14 | (Austria) L Wraber | 17 | 15
(Chinese Taipei) Cheng P-w | 21 | 21
(Chinese Taipei) Yang C-h | 19 | 17

Third round
Q2 | (Japan) K Naraoka | 16 | 14
(Chinese Taipei) Cheng P-w | 21 | 21

==== Section 7 ====
First round
(Chinese Taipei) Lin C-h | 18 | 12
(Sweden) M Borg | 21 | 21
(Japan) K Tsuneyama | 21 | 21
10 | (Vietnam) Nguyen T M | 13 | 12
(Czech Republic) J Fröhlich | 21 | 21
(Trinidad and Tobago) N Bonkowsky | 12 | 8
(Slovakia) M Hlinican | 11 | 13
6 | (South Korea) Lee D-k | 21 | 21

Second round
(Sweden) M Borg | 19 | 11
(Japan) K Tsuneyama | 21 | 21
(Czech Republic) J Fröhlich
6 | (South Korea) Lee D-k | w | / | o

Third round
(Japan) K Tsuneyama | 23 | 12 | 21
6 | (South Korea) Lee D-k | 21 | 21 | 18

==== Section 8 ====
First round
Q1 | (Canada) K Barkman | 15 | 13
(Denmark) E Holst | 21 | 21
(Australia) P S Low | 7 | 8
9 | (Malaysia) Z Zulkiffli | 21 | 21
(Slovenia) I Utrosa | 21 | 10 | 14
(Chinese Taipei) Chen C-w | 17 | 21 | 21
(Mexico) J Castillo | 18 | 15
2 | (England) R Ouseph | 21 | 21

Second round
(Denmark) E Holst | 21 | 5 | 21
9 | (Malaysia) Z Zulkiffli | 16 | 21 | 19
(Chinese Taipei) Chen C-w | 21 | 17 | 12
2 | (England) R Ouseph | 15 | 21 | 21

Third round
(Denmark) E Holst | 21 | 4 | 5
2 | (England) R Ouseph | 19 | 21 | 21

== Women's singles ==
=== Seeds ===
1. (Japan) Nozomi Okuhara (withdrawn)
2. (South Korea) Bae Yeon-ju (second round)
3. (Canada) Michelle Li (second round)
4. (Thailand) Busanan Ongbumrungpan (second round)
5. (Japan) Minatsu Mitani (semifinals)
6. (Japan) Yui Hashimoto (withdrawn)
7. (Scotland) Kirsty Gilmour (final)
8. (Thailand) Porntip Buranaprasertsuk (quarterfinals)

=== Finals ===
Semifinals
7 | (Scotland) Kirsty Gilmour | 21 | 21
(Thailand) Nichaon Jindapon | 14 | 8
(Chinese Taipei) Pai Yu-po | 21 | 12 | 21
5 | (Japan) Minatsu Mitani | 16 | 21 | 18

Final
7 | (Scotland) Kirsty Gilmour | 21 | 15 | 15
(Chinese Taipei) Pai Yu-po | 18 | 21 | 21

=== Top half ===
==== Section 1 ====
First round
PFQ | (Australia) M Sun | 9 | 5
(United States) I Wang | 21 | 21
(Brazil) L Vicente | 21 | 17 | 12
(Canada) R Honderich | 17 | 21 | 21
7 | (Scotland) K Gilmour | 21 | 21
(Russia) N Perminova | 19 | 8
(Czech Republic) K Gavnholt | 21 | 21
(Australia) Wendy Chen H-y | 5 | 11

Second round
(United States) I Wang | 17 | 21 | 22
(Canada) R Honderich | 21 | 18 | 20
7 | (Scotland) K Gilmour | 21 | 19 | 21
(Czech Republic) K Gavnholt | 11 | 21 | 13

Quarterfinals
(United States) I Wang | 13 | 18
7 | (Scotland) K Gilmour | 21 | 21

==== Section 2 ====
First round
4 | (Thailand) B Ongbumrungpan | 21 | 21
(Italy) J Cicognini | 8 | 9
(Chinese Taipei) Hsu Y-c | 16 | 18
(Thailand) N Jindapon | 21 | 21
PFQ | (Chinese Taipei) Sung S-y | 17 | 21 | 21
(Vietnam) Vũ T T | 21 | 19 | 18
(Mexico) H Gaitán | 6 | 15
(Denmark) M Poulsen | 21 | 21

Second round
4 | (Thailand) B Ongbumrungpan | 7^{r}
(Thailand) N Jindapon | 15
PFQ | (Chinese Taipei) Sung S-y | 13 | 16
(Denmark) M Poulsen | 21 | 21

Quarterfinals
(Thailand) N Jindapon | 14 | 21 | 21
(Denmark) M Poulsen | 21 | 8 | 13

=== Bottom half ===
==== Section 3 ====
First round
Q3 | (United States) C Pan | 19 | 21 | 21
(Denmark) L Kjaersfeldt | 21 | 8 | 19
PFQ | (Mexico) S Solis | 5 | 7
8 | (Thailand) P Buranaprasertsuk | 21 | 21
(Lithuania) A Stapušaitytė | 18 | 14
(Chinese Taipei) Pai Y-p | 21 | 21
Q2 | (Chinese Taipei) Hu L-f | 17 | 15
3 | (Canada) M Li | 21 | 21

Second round
Q3 | (United States) C Pan | 12 | 18
8 | (Thailand) P Buranaprasertsuk | 21 | 21
(Chinese Taipei) Pai Y-p | 21 | 21
3 | (Canada) M Li | 12 | 19

Quarterfinals
8 | (Thailand) P Buranaprasertsuk | 21 | 20 | 10
(Chinese Taipei) Pai Y-p | 19 | 22 | 21

==== Section 4 ====
First round
(Finland) N Vainio | 21 | 25
(United States) R Schafer | 9 | 23
Q1 | (Hungary) M Szoke | 11 | 9
5 | (Japan) M Mitani | 21 | 21
(United States) Zhang BW | 21 | 21
Q4 | (United States) D Gupta | 3 | 7
(Austria) E Baldauf | 14 | 18
2 | (South Korea) Bae Y-j | 21 | 21

Second round
(Finland) N Vainio | 21 | 18
5 | (Japan) M Mitani | 23 | 21
(United States) Zhang BW | 21 | 21
2 | (South Korea) Bae Y-j | 17 | 18

Quarterfinals
5 | (Japan) M Mitani | 14 | 21 | 21
(United States) Zhang BW | 21 | 19 | 12

== Men's doubles ==
=== Seeds ===
1. (Russia) Vladimir Ivanov / Ivan Sozonov (final)
2. (Malaysia) Goh V Shem / Tan Wee Kiong (champion)
3. (India) Manu Attri / B. Sumeeth Reddy (second round)
4. (Chinese Taipei) Chen Hung-ling / Wang Chi-lin (semifinals)
5. (England) Marcus Ellis / Chris Langridge (quarterfinals)
6. (Germany) Michael Fuchs / Johannes Schoettler (quarterfinals)
7. (Thailand) Dechapol Puavaranukroh / Kittinupong Kedren (quarterfinals)
8. (England) Andrew Ellis / Peter Mills (withdrawn)

=== Finals ===
Semifinals

Final

1
- (Russia) Vladimir Ivanov
- (Russia) Ivan Sozonov
14
21
23

- (Thailand) Bodin Isara
21
16
21

1
- (Russia) Vladimir Ivanov
- (Russia) Ivan Sozonov
14
17

2
- (Malaysia) Goh V Shem
- (Malaysia) Tan Wee Kiong
21
21

4
- (Chinese Taipei) Chen Hung-ling
- (Chinese Taipei) Wang Chi-lin
19
22

2
- (Malaysia) Goh V Shem
- (Malaysia) Tan Wee Kiong
21
24

=== Top half ===
==== Section 1 ====
First round

Second round

Quarterfinals

1
- (Russia) V Ivanov
- (Russia) I Sozonov
21
21

- (Malaysia) Z B Zulkiffli
- (Malaysia) Zu Zulkiffli
11
8

1
- (Russia) V Ivanov
- (Russia) I Sozonov
21
21

- (United States) R Chew
- (Indonesia) F Kurniawan
9
13

- (United States) R Chew
- (Indonesia) F Kurniawan
21
21

Q3
- (Vietnam) Bao M
- (Vietnam) Duong B D
13
12

1
- (Russia) V Ivanov
- (Russia) I Sozonov
21
21

- (Chinese Taipei) Lin C-y
- (Chinese Taipei) Wu H-l
13
18

PFQ
- (Japan) K Mitsuhashi
- (Japan) Y Watanabe
16
16

- (Chinese Taipei) Lin C-y
- (Chinese Taipei) Wu H-l
21
21

- (Chinese Taipei) Lin C-y
- (Chinese Taipei) Wu H-l
21
23

- (France) B Careme
- (France) R Labar
14
21

- (France) B Careme
- (France) R Labar
21
21

- (Canada) L Couture
- (Canada) N Yakura
7
13

==== Section 2 ====
First round

Second round

Quarterfinals

3
- (India) M Attri
- (India) B. S Reddy
21
21

- (United States) R Gunawan
- (United States) C Lin
7
11

3
- (India) M Attri
- (India) B. S Reddy
14
6

- (Thailand) B Issara
21
21

- (Thailand) B Isara
21
21

- (Belgium) M Dierickx
- (Belgium) F Golinski
15
16

- (Thailand) B Isara
21
9
21

6
- (Germany) M Fuchs
- (Germany) J Schoettler
19
21
17

6
- (Germany) M Fuchs
- (Germany) J Schoettler
21
21

- (Mexico) A Hernández
- (Germany) J Persson
9
7

6
- (Germany) M Fuchs
- (Germany) J Schoettler
21
21

Q2
- (Chinese Taipei) Chen C-w
- (Chinese Taipei) Lin C-h
7
8

- (Chinese Taipei) Cheng P-w
- (Chinese Taipei) Kan C-y
11
16

Q2
- (Chinese Taipei) Chen C-w
- (Chinese Taipei) Lin C-h
21
21

=== Bottom half ===
==== Section 3 ====
First round

Second round

Quarterfinals

- (Japan) T Hoki
- (Japan) Y Kobayashi
21
21

Q4
- (United States) H L Lee
- (South Korea) Yoo Y-s
10
19

- (Japan) T Hoki
- (Japan) Y Kobayashi
11
21

7
- (Thailand) D Puavaranukroh
21
23

- (Czech Republic) J Fröhlich
- (Slovakia) M Hlinican

7
- (Thailand) D Puavaranukroh
w
/
o

7
- (Thailand) D Puavaranukroh
14
12

4
- (Chinese Taipei) Chen H-l
- (Chinese Taipei) Wang C-l
21
21

- (India) A Francis
- (India) T Kona
21
21

- (Ukraine) A Pochtarov
- (Slovenia) I Utrosa
9
15

- (India) A Francis
- (India) T Kona
24
12

4
- (Chinese Taipei) Chen H-l
- (Chinese Taipei) Wang C-l
26
21

- (Guatemala) S Jonathan
- (Guatemala) R Ramírez

4
- (Chinese Taipei) Chen H-l
- (Chinese Taipei) Wang C-l
w
/
o

==== Section 4 ====
First round

Second round

Quarterfinals

- (Canada) A Liu
- (Canada) D Ng
21
21

Q1
- (Australia) C Chen
- (Australia) P S Low
11
6

- (Canada) A Liu
- (Canada) D Ng
13
14

5
- (England) M Ellis
- (England) C Langridge
21
21

- (Denmark) C L Thomsen
- (Denmark) J Persson
10
10

5
- (England) M Ellis
- (England) C Langridge
21
21

5
- (England) M Ellis
- (England) C Langridge
18
16

2
- (Malaysia) Goh V S
- (Malaysia) Tan W K
21
21

- (Mexico) J Castillo
- (Mexico) L Munoz
22
21

- (United States) M Fogarty
- (United States) B Seguin
20
16

- (Mexico) J Castillo
- (Mexico) L Munoz
6
11

2
- (Malaysia) Goh V S
- (Malaysia) Tan W K
21
21

- (United States) P Chew
- (United States) S Pongnairat
12
12

2
- (Malaysia) Goh V S
- (Malaysia) Tan W K
21
21

== Women's doubles ==
=== Seeds ===
1. (Japan) Reika Kakiiwa / Miyuki Maeda (withdrawn)
2. (Japan) Naoko Fukuman / Kurumi Yonao (withdrawn)
3. (South Korea) Go Ah-ra / Yoo Hae-won (withdrawn)
4. (Thailand) Jongkongphan Kittiharakul / Rawinda Prajongjai (quarterfinals)

=== Finals ===
Semifinals

Final

- (Thailand) Puttita Supajirakul
6
18

- (South Korea) Jung Kyung-eun
- (South Korea) Shin Seung-chan
21
21

- (South Korea) Jung Kyung-eun
- (South Korea) Shin Seung-chan
24
18
21

- (South Korea) Chang Ye-na
- (South Korea) Lee So-hee
22
21
12

- (South Korea) Chang Ye-na
- (South Korea) Lee So-hee
21
21

- (Germany) Isabel Herttrich
- (Germany) Birgit Michels
7
9

=== Top half ===
==== Section 1 ====
First round

Second round

Quarterfinals

1
- (Japan) R Kakiiwa
- (Japan) M Maeda

BYE

1
- (Japan) R Kakiiwa
- (Japan) M Maeda

- (Thailand) P Supajirakul
- (Thailand) S Taerattanachai
w
/
o

- (Indonesia) K Dewi
- (Indonesia) J Gozali
9
18

- (Thailand) P Supajirakul
- (Thailand) S Taerattanachai
21
21

- (Thailand) P Supajirakul
- (Thailand) S Taerattanachai
21
21

- (Germany) J Goliszewski
- (Germany) C Nelte
17
7

- (Canada) M Tong
- (Canada) J Wu

BYE

- (Canada) M Tong
- (Canada) J Wu
11
13

- (Germany) J Goliszewski
- (Germany) C Nelte
21
21

- (Australia) Wendy Chen H-y
- (Chinese Taipei) Lin S-y
11
9

- (Germany) J Goliszewski
- (Germany) C Nelte
21
21

==== Section 2 ====
First round

Second round

Quarterfinals

3
- (South Korea) Go A-r
- (South Korea) Yoo H-w

BYE

3
- (South Korea) Go A-r
- (South Korea) Yoo H-w

- (England) H Olver
- (England) L Smith
w
/
o

- (Chinese Taipei) Hu L-f
- (Chinese Taipei) Sung S-y
11
21
19

- (England) H Olver
- (England) L Smith
21
19
21

- (England) H Olver
- (England) L Smith
20
15

- (South Korea) Jung K-e
- (South Korea) Shin S-c
22
21

- (United States) J Y Hong
- (United States) Zhang BW
13
14

- (South Korea) Jung K-e
- (South Korea) Shin S-c
21
21

- (South Korea) Jung K-e
- (South Korea) Shin S-c
21
21

- (France) M Batomene
- (France) E Lefel
4
10

- (France) M Batomene
- (France) E Lefel
21
21

- (Mexico) H Gaitán
- (Mexico) S Solis
13
9

=== Bottom half ===
==== Section 3 ====
First round

Second round

Quarterfinals

- (Brazil) Lo Vicente
- (Brazil) Lu Vicente
21
21

- (United States) A Lee
- (United States) S Lee
9
8

- (Brazil) Lo Vicente
- (Brazil) Lu Vicente
7
12

- (South Korea) Chang Y-n
- (South Korea) Lee S-h
21
21

- (France) A Fontaine
- (France) A Tran
11
9

- (South Korea) Chang Y-n
- (South Korea) Lee S-h
21
21

- (South Korea) Chang Y-n
- (South Korea) Lee S-h
21
21

4
- (Thailand) J Kittiharakul
- (Thailand) R Prajongjai
19
17

- (Turkey) O Bayrak
- (Turkey) N Yigit

- (United States) Y Cohn
- (United States) R Schafer
w
/
o

- (United States) Y Cohn
- (United States) R Schafer
7
4

4
- (Thailand) J Kittiharakul
- (Thailand) R Prajongjai
21
21

BYE

4
- (Thailand) J Kittiharakul
- (Thailand) R Prajongjai

==== Section 4 ====
First round

Second round

Quarterfinals

- (United States) E Lee
- (United States) P L Obanana
19
21
18

- (Chinese Taipei) Hsu Y-c
- (Chinese Taipei) Pai Y-p
21
19
21

- (Chinese Taipei) Hsu Y-c
- (Chinese Taipei) Pai Y-p
15
21
10

- (Germany) I Herttrich
- (Germany) B Michels
21
16
21

- (Canada) A Bruce
- (Canada) P Chan
18
18

- (Germany) I Herttrich
- (Germany) B Michels
21
21

- (Germany) I Herttrich
- (Germany) B Michels
21
21

- (Australia) L Choo
- (Canada) R Honderich
19
14

- (United States) P Phongasavithas
- (United States) V Phongasavithas
8
13

- (Australia) L Choo
- (Canada) R Honderich
21
21

- (Australia) L Choo
- (Canada) R Honderich
w
/
o

2
- (Japan) N Fukuman
- (Japan) K Yonao

BYE

2
- (Japan) N Fukuman
- (Japan) K Yonao

== Mixed doubles ==
=== Seeds ===
1. (Germany) Michael Fuchs / Birgit Michels (final)
2. (Malaysia) Chan Peng Soon / Goh Liu Ying (quarterfinals)
3. (Singapore) Danny Bawa Chrisnanta / Vanessa Neo Yu Yan (first round)
4. (Thailand) Sudket Prapakamol / Saralee Thoungthongkam (first round)
5. (United States) Phillip Chew / Jamie Subandhi (semifinals)
6. (France) Ronan Labar / Emilie Lefel (quarterfinals)
7. (Canada) Toby Ng / Alex Bruce (first round)
8. (South Korea) Choi Sol-gyu / Eom Hye-won (champion)

=== Finals ===
Semifinals

Final

1
- (Germany) Michael Fuchs
- (Germany) Birgit Michels
21
21

5
- (United States) Phillip Chew
- (United States) Jamie Subandhi
14
16

1
- (Germany) Michael Fuchs
- (Germany) Birgit Michels
12
14

8
- (South Korea) Choi Sol-gyu
- (South Korea) Eom Hye-won
21
21

- (United States) Tony Gunawan
- (United States) Jamie Hsu
10
10

8
- (South Korea) Choi Sol-gyu
- (South Korea) Eom Hye-won
21
21

=== Top half ===
==== Section 1 ====
First round

Second round

Quarterfinals

1
- (Germany) M Fuchs
- (Germany) B Michels
21
16
21

- (Australia) R Middleton
- (Australia) L Choo
17
21
19

1
- (Germany) M Fuchs
- (Germany) B Michels
21
21

- (Chinese Taipei) Wang C-l
- (Chinese Taipei) Sung S-y
19
11

- (Russia) E Dremin
- (Russia) E Dimova
18
17

- (Chinese Taipei) Wang C-l
- (Chinese Taipei) Sung S-y
21
21

1
- (Germany) M Fuchs
- (Germany) B Michels
21
21

6
- (France) R Labar
- (France) E Lefel
11
16

6
- (France) R Labar
- (France) E Lefel
21
21

- (Scotland) A Casey
- (Australia) M Sun
10
13

6
- (France) R Labar
- (France) E Lefel
22
21

- (Thailand) D Puavaranukroh
20
16

- (Thailand) D Puavaranukroh
19
21
21

- (Canada) P Charron
- (Canada) J Wu
21
12
16

==== Section 2 ====
First round

Second round

Quarterfinals

3
- (Singapore) D B Chrisnanta
24
18

- (Sweden) N Ruponen
- (Sweden) A Hogstrom
21
21

- (Sweden) N Ruponen
- (Sweden) A Hogstrom
13
22
21

- (France) B Careme
- (France) A Tran
21
20
16

- (France) B Careme
- (France) A Tran
21
21

- (United States) R Gunawan
- (United States) A Lee
7
6

- (Sweden) N Ruponen
- (Sweden) A Hogstrom
12
9

5
- (United States) P Chew
- (United States) J Subandhi
21
21

5
- (United States) P Chew
- (United States) J Subandhi
21
15

- (Vietnam) Duong B D
- (Vietnam) Thai T H G
15
17^{r}

5
- (United States) P Chew
- (United States) J Subandhi

BYE

- (Republic of Ireland) S Magee
- (Republic of Ireland) C Magee
w
/
o

- (Japan) K Sonoda
- (Japan) N Fukuman
w
/
o

=== Bottom half ===
==== Section 3 ====
First round

Second round

Quarterfinals

- (United States) T Gunawan
- (United States) J Hsu
21
21

- (Australia) C Chen
- (Australia) Wendy Chen H-y
6
13

- (United States) T Gunawan
- (United States) J Hsu
21
21

- (France) G Mittelheisser
- (France) A Fontaine
12
18

- (France) G Mittelheisser
- (France) A Fontaine
17
21
21

7
- (Canada) T Ng
- (Canada) A Bruce
21
15
14

- (United States) T Gunawan
- (United States) J Hsu
10
21
21

- (Chinese Taipei) Chen H-l
- (Chinese Taipei) Hu L-f
21
18
17

- (Austria) D Obernosterer
- (Austria) E Baldauf
21
21

- (Canada) P E Pilote
- (Canada) M Tong
15
18

- (Austria) D Obernosterer
- (Austria) E Baldauf
15
17

- (Chinese Taipei) Chen H-l
- (Chinese Taipei) Hu L-f
21
21

- (Chinese Taipei) Chen H-l
- (Chinese Taipei) Hu L-f
24
15
21

4
- (Thailand) S Prapakamol
- (Thailand) S Thoungthongkam
22
21
19

==== Section 4 ====
First round

Second round

Quarterfinals

- (Canada) N Yakura
- (Indonesia) J Gozali
14
16

- (United States) H L Lee
- (Canada) P Chan
21
21

- (United States) H L Lee
- (Canada) P Chan
15
15

8
- (South Korea) Choi S-g
- (South Korea) Eom H-w
21
21

- (United States) R Chew
- (United States) S Lee
7
5

8
- (South Korea) Choi S-g
- (South Korea) Eom H-w
21
21

8
- (South Korea) Choi S-g
- (South Korea) Eom H-w
21
21

2
- (Malaysia) Chan P S
- (Malaysia) Goh L Y
19
17

- (United States) Y T Chan
- (United States) Y Kawasaki
5
14

- (Indonesia) F Kurniawan
- (Indonesia) K Dewi
21
21

- (Indonesia) F Kurniawan
- (Indonesia) K Dewi
12
21
25

2
- (Malaysia) Chan P S
- (Malaysia) Goh L Y
21
19
27

- (Japan) K Kazuno
- (Japan) A Kurihara
18
18

2
- (Malaysia) Chan P S
- (Malaysia) Goh L Y
21
21

| Preceded by 2015 Indonesian Masters Grand Prix Gold | BWF Grand Prix Gold and Grand Prix; 2015 season | Succeeded by 2015 Mexico City Grand Prix |
