= 2015 BWF Grand Prix Gold and Grand Prix =

The 2015 BWF Grand Prix Gold and Grand Prix was the ninth season of the BWF Grand Prix Gold and Grand Prix.

== Schedule ==
Below is the schedule released by Badminton World Federation:

Tour	Official title	Venue	City	Date		Prize money USD	Report
Tour	Official title	Venue	City	Start	Finish	Prize money USD	Report
1	Malaysia Masters Grand Prix Gold	Stadium Perpaduan	Kuching	January 13	January 18	120,000	Report
2	(India) Syed Modi International Grand Prix Gold	Babu Banarasi Das Indoor Stadium	Lucknow	January 20	January 25	120,000	Report
3	(Germany) German Open Grand Prix Gold	RWE-Sporthalle	Mülheim	February 24	March 1	120,000	Report
4	(Switzerland) Swiss Open Grand Prix Gold	St. Jakobshalle	Basel	March 10	March 15	120,000	Report
5	China Masters Grand Prix Gold	Olympic Sports Center Xincheng Gymnasium	Changzhou	April 14	April 19	250,000	Report
6	New Zealand Open Grand Prix Gold	North Shore Events Centre	Auckland	April 28	May 3	120,000	Report
7	(United States) U.S. Open Grand Prix Gold	Suffolk County Community College	New York	June 16	June 21	120,000	Report
8	Canada Open Grand Prix	Markin MacPhail Centre	Calgary	June 23	June 28	50,000	Report
9	Chinese Taipei Open Grand Prix Gold	Taipei Arena	Taipei	July 14	July 19	200,000	Report
10	(Russia) Russian Open Grand Prix	Sport Hall Olympic	Vladivostok	July 21	July 26	50,000	Report
11	Vietnam Open Grand Prix	Nguyen Du Stadium	Ho Chi Minh City	August 24	August 30	50,000	Report
12	Thailand Open Grand Prix Gold	Thunder Dome Muangthong Thani	Bangkok	September 29	October 4	120,000	Report
13	(Netherlands) Dutch Open Grand Prix	Topsportcentrum	Almere	October 6	October 11	50,000	Report
14	Chinese Taipei Grand Prix	Hsin Chuang Gymnasium	Taipei	October 13	October 18	50,000	Report
15	(Germany) Bitburger Open Grand Prix Gold	Saarlandhalle	Saarbrücken	October 27	November 1	120,000	Report
16	(South Korea) Korea Masters Grand Prix Gold	Jeonju Hwasan Gymnasium	Jeonju	November 3	November 8	120,000	Report
17	(Scotland) Scottish Open Grand Prix	Emirates Arena	Glasgow	November 18	November 22	50,000	Report
18	Brazil Open Grand Prix	Riocentro 4	Rio de Janeiro	November 24	November 29	50,000	Report
19	Macau Open Grand Prix Gold	Tap Seac Multisport Pavilion Macau	Macau	November 24	November 29	120,000	Report
20	(Indonesia) Indonesian Masters Grand Prix Gold	Gedung Graha Cakrawala	Malang	December 1	December 6	120,000	Report
21	(United States) U.S. Open Grand Prix	Orange County Badminton Club	California	December 7	December 12	50,000	Report
22	Mexico City Grand Prix	Centro Deportivo Chapultepec A.C.	Distrito Federal	December 16	December 20	50,000	Report

== Results ==
=== Winners ===
Tour	Men's singles	Women's singles	Men's doubles	Women's doubles	Mixed doubles
Malaysia	(South Korea) Lee Hyun-il	(Japan) Nozomi Okuhara	(Japan) Kenta Kazuno (Japan) Kazushi Yamada	(Denmark) Christinna Pedersen (Denmark) Kamilla Rytter Juhl	(Denmark) Joachim Fischer Nielsen (Denmark) Christinna Pedersen
India	(India) Parupalli Kashyap	(India) Saina Nehwal	(Denmark) Mathias Boe (Denmark) Carsten Mogensen	(Malaysia) Amelia Alicia Anscelly (Malaysia) Soong Fie Cho	(Indonesia) Riky Widianto (Indonesia) Richi Puspita Dili
Germany	(Denmark) Jan Ø. Jørgensen	(South Korea) Sung Ji-hyun	(Denmark) Mads Conrad-Petersen (Denmark) Mads Pieler Kolding	(Denmark) Christinna Pedersen (Denmark) Kamilla Rytter Juhl	(Denmark) Mads Pieler Kolding (Denmark) Kamilla Rytter Juhl
(Switzerland) Swiss	(India) Srikanth Kidambi	(China) Sun Yu	(China) Cai Yun (China) Lu Kai	(China) Bao Yixin (China) Tang Yuanting	(China) Lu Kai (China) Huang Yaqiong
China	(China) Wang Zhengming	(China) He Bingjiao	(China) Li Junhui (China) Liu Yuchen	(China) Tang Jinhua (China) Zhong Qianxin	(China) Liu Cheng (China) Bao Yixin
New Zealand	(South Korea) Lee Hyun-il	(Japan) Saena Kawakami	(China) Huang Kaixiang (China) Zheng Siwei	(China) Xia Huan (China) Zhong Qianxin	(China) Zheng Siwei (China) Chen Qingchen
(United States) U.S. Gold	(Malaysia) Lee Chong Wei	(Japan) Nozomi Okuhara	(China) Li Junhui (China) Liu Yuchen	(China) Yu Yang (China) Zhong Qianxin	(China) Huang Kaixiang (China) Huang Dongping
Canada	(Malaysia) Lee Chong Wei	(Canada) Michelle Li	(China) Li Junhui (China) Liu Yuchen	(India) Jwala Gutta (India) Ashwini Ponnappa	(Hong Kong) Lee Chun Hei (Hong Kong) Chau Hoi Wah
(Chinese Taipei) Taipei Gold	(China) Chen Long	(China) Wang Yihan	(China) Fu Haifeng (China) Zhang Nan	(Indonesia) Nitya Krishinda Maheswari (Indonesia) Greysia Polii	(South Korea) Ko Sung-hyun (South Korea) Kim Ha-na
Russia	(Indonesia) Tommy Sugiarto	(Czech Republic) Kristína Gavnholt	(Russia) Vladimir Ivanov (Russia) Ivan Sozonov	(Bulgaria) Gabriela Stoeva (Bulgaria) Stefani Stoeva	(Malaysia) Chan Peng Soon (Malaysia) Goh Liu Ying
Vietnam	(Indonesia) Tommy Sugiarto	(Japan) Saena Kawakami	(China) Li Junhui (China) Liu Yuchen	(Thailand) Jongkolphan Kititharakul (Thailand) Rawinda Prajongjai	(China) Huang Kaixiang (China) Huang Dongping
Thailand	(South Korea) Lee Hyun-il	(South Korea) Sung Ji-hyun	(Indonesia) Wahyu Nayaka (Indonesia) Ade Yusuf	(China) Huang Dongping (China) Li Yinhui	(South Korea) Choi Sol-gyu (South Korea) Eom Hye-won
Netherlands	(India) Ajay Jayaram	(Scotland) Kirsty Gilmour	(Malaysia) Koo Kien Keat (Malaysia) Tan Boon Heong	(Bulgaria) Gabriela Stoeva (Bulgaria) Stefani Stoeva	(France) Ronan Labar (France) Émilie Lefel
(Chinese Taipei) Taipei	(Indonesia) Sony Dwi Kuncoro	(South Korea) Lee Jang-mi	(Indonesia) Marcus Fernaldi Gideon (Indonesia) Kevin Sanjaya Sukamuljo	(Indonesia) Anggia Shitta Awanda (Indonesia) Ni Ketut Mahadewi Istarani	(Indonesia) Ronald Alexander (Indonesia) Melati Daeva Oktavianti
(Germany) Bitburger	(Hong Kong) Ng Ka Long	(Japan) Akane Yamaguchi	(Denmark) Mads Conrad-Petersen (Denmark) Mads Pieler Kolding	(China) Tang Yuanting (China) Yu Yang	(Poland) Robert Mateusiak (Poland) Nadieżda Zięba
(South Korea) Korea	(South Korea) Lee Dong-keun	(Japan) Sayaka Sato	(South Korea) Kim Gi-jung (South Korea) Kim Sa-rang	(South Korea) Chang Ye-na (South Korea) Lee So-hee	(South Korea) Ko Sung-hyun (South Korea) Kim Ha-na
Scotland	(Denmark) Hans-Kristian Vittinghus	(Denmark) Line Kjærsfeldt	(Germany) Michael Fuchs (Germany) Johannes Schöttler	(Japan) Yuki Fukushima (Japan) Sayaka Hirota	(Russia) Vitalij Durkin (Russia) Nina Vislova
Brazil	(China) Lin Dan	(China) Shen Yaying	(China) Huang Kaixiang (China) Zheng Siwei	(China) Chen Qingchen (China) Jia Yifan	(China) Zheng Siwei (China) Chen Qingchen
Macau	(South Korea) Jeon Hyeok-jin	(India) P. V. Sindhu	(South Korea) Ko Sung-hyun (South Korea) Shin Baek-cheol	(South Korea) Jung Kyung-eun (South Korea) Shin Seung-chan	(South Korea) Shin Baek-cheol (South Korea) Chae Yoo-jung
Indonesia	(Indonesia) Tommy Sugiarto	(China) He Bingjiao	(Indonesia) Berry Angriawan (Indonesia) Rian Agung Saputro	(China) Tang Yuanting (China) Yu Yang	(Indonesia) Tontowi Ahmad (Indonesia) Liliyana Natsir
(United States) U.S.	(South Korea) Lee Hyun-il	(Chinese Taipei) Pai Yu-po	(Malaysia) Goh V Shem (Malaysia) Tan Wee Kiong	(South Korea) Jung Kyung-eun (South Korea) Shin Seung-chan	(South Korea) Choi Sol-gyu (South Korea) Eom Hye-won
Mexico	(South Korea) Lee Dong-keun	(Japan) Sayaka Sato	(India) Manu Attri (India) B. Sumeeth Reddy	(Japan) Shizuka Matsuo (Japan) Mami Naito	(Malaysia) Chan Peng Soon (Malaysia) Goh Liu Ying

=== Performance by countries ===
Tabulated below are the Grand Prix performances based on countries. Only countries who have won a title are listed:

S.no	Team	MAS	IND	GER	SUI	CHN	NZL	USA	CAN	TPE	RUS	VIE	THA	NED	TPE	GER	KOR	SCO	BRA	MAC	INA	USA	MEX	Total
1	China				4	5	3	3	1	3		2	1			1			5		2			30
2	Korea	1		1			1			1			3		1		4			4		3	1	20
3	Indonesia		1							1	1	1	1		4						3			12
4	Denmark	2	1	4												1		2						10
4	Japan	2					1	1				1				1	1	1					2	10
5	Malaysia		1					1	1		1			1								1	1	7
5	India		2		1				1					1						1			1	7
6	Bulgaria										1			1										2
6	Hong Kong								1							1								2
6	Russia										1							1						2
7	Czech Republic										1													1
7	Canada								1															1
7	Thailand											1												1
7	France													1										1
7	Scotland													1										1
7	Poland															1								1
7	Germany																	1						1
7	Chinese Taipei																					1		1

== Grand Prix Gold ==
=== Malaysia Masters ===
Category	Winners	Runners-up	Score
Men's singles	(South Korea) Lee Hyun-il	(South Korea) Jeon Hyeok-jin	19–21, 21–13, 21–15
Women's singles	(Japan) Nozomi Okuhara	(Japan) Sayaka Takahashi	21–13, 21–17
Men's doubles	(Japan) Kenta Kazuno / Kazushi Yamada	(Chinese Taipei) Chen Hung-ling / Wang Chi-lin	21–19, 14–21, 21–17
Women's doubles	(Denmark) Christinna Pedersen / Kamilla Rytter Juhl	(Japan) Naoko Fukuman / Kurumi Yonao	21–14, 21–14
Mixed doubles	(Denmark) Joachim Fischer Nielsen / Christinna Pedersen	(Indonesia) Praveen Jordan / Debby Susanto	21–18, 21–18

=== Syed Modi International ===
Category	Winners	Runners-up	Score
Men's singles	(India) Parupalli Kashyap	(India) Srikanth Kidambi	23–21, 23–21
Women's singles	(India) Saina Nehwal	(Spain) Carolina Marín	19–21, 25–23, 21–16
Men's doubles	(Denmark) Mathias Boe / Carsten Mogensen	(Russia) Vladimir Ivanov / Ivan Sozonov	21–9, 22–20
Women's doubles	(Malaysia) Amelia Alicia Anscelly / Soong Fie Cho	(Malaysia) Vivian Hoo Kah Mun / Woon Khe Wei	22–20, 21–15
Mixed doubles	(Indonesia) Riky Widianto / Richi Puspita Dili	(India) Manu Attri / K. Maneesha	21–17, 21–17

=== German Open ===
Category	Winners	Runners-up	Score
Men's singles	(Denmark) Jan Ø. Jørgensen	(Indonesia) Dionysius Hayom Rumbaka	21–12, 21–13
Women's singles	(South Korea) Sung Ji-hyun	(Spain) Carolina Marín	21–15, 14–21, 21–6
Men's doubles	(Denmark) Mads Conrad-Petersen / Mads Pieler Kolding	(Russia) Vladimir Ivanov / Ivan Sozonov	22–20, 21–19
Women's doubles	(Denmark) Kamilla Rytter Juhl / Christinna Pedersen	(Indonesia) Della Destiara Haris / Rosyita Eka Putri Sari	21–18, 17–21, 21–9
Mixed doubles	(Denmark) Mads Pieler Kolding / Kamilla Rytter Juhl	(Denmark) Joachim Fischer Nielsen / Christinna Pedersen	21–18, 21–17

=== Swiss Open ===
Category	Winners	Runners-up	Score
Men's singles	(India) Srikanth Kidambi	(Denmark) Viktor Axelsen	21–15, 12–21, 21–14
Women's singles	(China) Sun Yu	(Thailand) Busanan Ongbamrungphan	21–16, 21–12
Men's doubles	(China) Cai Yun / Lu Kai	(Malaysia) Goh V Shem / Tan Wee Kiong	21–19, 14–21, 21–17
Women's doubles	(China) Bao Yixin / Tang Yuanting	(Japan) Ayane Kurihara / Naru Shinoya	21–6, 17–21, 21–17
Mixed doubles	(China) Lu Kai / Huang Yaqiong	(China) Liu Cheng / Bao Yixin	17–21, 22–20, 21–13

=== China Masters ===
Category	Winners	Runners-up	Score
Men's singles	(China) Wang Zhengming	(China) Huang Yuxiang	22–20, 21–19
Women's singles	(China) He Bingjiao	(China) Hui Xirui	21–13, 21–9
Men's doubles	(China) Li Junhui / Liu Yuchen	(China) Wang Yilyu / Zhang Wen	21–15, 19–21, 21–12
Women's doubles	(China) Tang Jinhua / Zhong Qianxin	(China) Bao Yixin / Tang Yuanting	21–14, 11–21, 21–17
Mixed doubles	(China) Liu Cheng / Bao Yixin	(Indonesia) Edi Subaktiar / Gloria Emanuelle Widjaja	18–21, 21–15, 26–24

=== New Zealand Open ===
Category	Winners	Runners-up	Score
Men's singles	(South Korea) Lee Hyun-il	(China) Qiao Bin	21–12, 21–14
Women's singles	(Japan) Saena Kawakami	(China) He Bingjiao	21–16, 21–18
Men's doubles	(China) Huang Kaixiang / Zheng Siwei	(Indonesia) Fajar Alfian / Muhammad Rian Ardianto	16–21, 21–17, 21–9
Women's doubles	(China) Xia Huan / Zhong Qianxin	(Japan) Yuki Fukushima / Sayaka Hirota	17–21, 24–22, 21–19
Mixed doubles	(China) Zheng Siwei / Chen Qingchen	(China) Yu Xiaoyu / Xia Huan	21–14, 21–8

=== U.S Open ===
Category	Winners	Runners-up	Score
Men's singles	(Malaysia) Lee Chong Wei	(Denmark) Hans-Kristian Vittinghus	22–20, 21–12
Women's singles	(Japan) Nozomi Okuhara	(Japan) Sayaka Sato	21–16, 21–14
Men's doubles	(China) Li Junhui / Liu Yuchen	(India) Manu Attri / B. Sumeeth Reddy	21–12, 21–16
Women's doubles	(China) Yu Yang / Zhong Qianxin	(Japan) Ayane Kurihara / Naru Shinoya	21–14, 21–10
Mixed doubles	(China) Huang Kaixiang / Huang Dongping	(Hong Kong) Lee Chun Hei / Chau Hoi Wah	21–15, 21–14

=== Chinese Taipei Open ===
Category	Winners	Runners-up	Score
Men's singles	(China) Chen Long	(Chinese Taipei) Chou Tien-chen	15–21, 21–9, 21–6
Women's singles	(China) Wang Yihan	(China) Li Xuerui	21–10, 21–9
Men's doubles	(China) Fu Haifeng / Zhang Nan	(Indonesia) Marcus Fernaldi Gideon / Kevin Sanjaya Sukamuljo	21–13, 21–8
Women's doubles	(Indonesia) Nitya Krishinda Maheswari / Greysia Polii	(China) Luo Ying / Luo Yu	21–17, 21–17
Mixed doubles	(South Korea) Ko Sung-hyun / Kim Ha-na	(South Korea) Shin Baek-cheol / Chae Yoo-jung	21–16, 21–18

=== Thailand Open ===
Category	Winners	Runners-up	Score
Men's singles	(South Korea) Lee Hyun-il	(Indonesia) Ihsan Maulana Mustofa	21–17, 22–24, 21–8
Women's singles	(South Korea) Sung Ji-hyun	(Singapore) Liang Xiaoyu	21–11, 21–14
Men's doubles	(Indonesia) Wahyu Nayaka / Ade Yusuf	(Malaysia) Koo Kien Keat / Tan Boon Heong	20–22, 23–21, 21–16
Women's doubles	(China) Huang Dongping / Li Yinhui	(South Korea) Chang Ye-na / Lee So-hee	20–22, 21–11, 21–15
Mixed doubles	(South Korea) Choi Sol-gyu / Eom Hye-won	(Indonesia) Praveen Jordan / Debby Susanto	21–19, 17–21, 21–16

=== Bitburger Open ===
Category	Winners	Runners-up	Score
Men's singles	(Hong Kong) Ng Ka Long	(Hong Kong) Wong Wing Ki	21–12, 21–13
Women's singles	(Japan) Akane Yamaguchi	(Thailand) Busanan Ongbamrungphan	16–21, 21–14, 21–13
Men's doubles	(Denmark) Mads Conrad-Petersen / Mads Pieler Kolding	(Russia) Vladimir Ivanov / Ivan Sozonov	21–18, 21–18
Women's doubles	(China) Tang Yuanting / Yu Yang	(Hong Kong) Poon Lok Yan / Tse Ying Suet	21–10, 21–18
Mixed doubles	(Poland) Robert Mateusiak / Nadieżda Zięba	(England) Chris Adcock / Gabby Adcock	21–18, 21–17

=== Korea Masters ===
Category	Winners	Runners-up	Score
Men's singles	(South Korea) Lee Dong-keun	(South Korea) Lee Hyun-il	17–21, 21-–14, 21–14
Women's singles	(Japan) Sayaka Sato	(China) Sun Yu	22–20, 21–19
Men's doubles	(South Korea) Kim Gi-jung / Kim Sa-rang	(South Korea) Ko Sung-hyun / Shin Baek-cheol	16–21, 21–18, 21–19
Women's doubles	(South Korea) Chang Ye-na / Lee So-hee	(South Korea) Jung Kyung-eun / Shin Seung-chan	21–7, 16–21, 21–19
Mixed doubles	(South Korea) Ko Sung-hyun / Kim Ha-na	(South Korea) Shin Baek-cheol / Chae Yoo-jung	19–21, 21–17, 21–19

=== Macau Open ===
Category	Winners	Runners-up	Score
Men's singles	(South Korea) Jeon Hyeok-jin	(China) Tian Houwei	21–11, 13–21, 23–21
Women's singles	(India) P. V. Sindhu	(Japan) Minatsu Mitani	21–9, 21–23, 21–14
Men's doubles	(South Korea) Ko Sung-hyun / Shin Baek-cheol	(Indonesia) Berry Angriawan / Rian Agung Saputro	22–20, 21–14
Women's doubles	(South Korea) Jung Kyung-eun / Shin Seung-chan	(Hong Kong) Poon Lok Yan / Tse Ying Suet	18–21, 15–15 Retired
Mixed doubles	(South Korea) Shin Baek-cheol / Chae Yoo-jung	(South Korea) Choi Sol-gyu / Eom Hye-won	21–18, 21–13

=== Indonesian Masters ===
Category	Winners	Runners-up	Score
Men's singles	(Indonesia) Tommy Sugiarto	(India) Srikanth Kidambi	17–21, 21–13, 24–22
Women's singles	(China) He Bingjiao	(China) Chen Yufei	21–18, 21–9
Men's doubles	(Indonesia) Berry Angriawan / Rian Agung Saputro	(China) Chai Biao / Hong Wei	21–11, 22–20
Women's doubles	(China) Tang Yuanting / Yu Yang	(Indonesia) Nitya Krishinda Maheswari / Greysia Polii	21–17, 21–11
Mixed doubles	(Indonesia) Tontowi Ahmad / Liliyana Natsir	(Indonesia) Praveen Jordan / Debby Susanto	21–18, 21–13

== Grand Prix ==
=== Canada Open ===
Category	Winners	Runners-up	Score
Men's singles	(Malaysia) Lee Chong Wei	(Hong Kong) Ng Ka Long	21–17, 21–13
Women's singles	(Canada) Michelle Li	(Japan) Kaori Imabeppu	21–17, 25–23
Men's doubles	(China) Li Junhui / Liu Yuchen	(China) Huang Kaixiang / Wang Sijie	17–21, 21–12, 21–18
Women's doubles	(India) Jwala Gutta / Ashwini Ponnappa	(Netherlands) Eefje Muskens / Selena Piek	21–19, 21–16
Mixed doubles	(Hong Kong) Lee Chun Hei / Chau Hoi Wah	(Indonesia) Andrei Adistia / Vita Marissa	21–16, 21–18

=== Russian Open ===
Category	Winners	Runners-up	Score
Men's singles	(Indonesia) Tommy Sugiarto	(Estonia) Raul Must	21–16, 21–10
Women's singles	(Czech Republic) Kristína Gavnholt	(Japan) Mayu Matsumoto	21–10, 22–20
Men's doubles	(Russia) Vladimir Ivanov / Ivan Sozonov	(Malaysia) Goh V Shem / Tan Wee Kiong	22–20, 21–19
Women's doubles	(Bulgaria) Gabriela Stoeva / Stefani Stoeva	(Germany) Johanna Goliszewski / Carla Nelte	21–15, 21–17
Mixed doubles	(Malaysia) Chan Peng Soon / Goh Liu Ying	(Japan) Yuta Watanabe / Arisa Higashino	21–13, 23–21

=== Vietnam Open ===
Category	Winners	Runners-up	Score
Men's singles	(Indonesia) Tommy Sugiarto	(South Korea) Lee Hyun-il	21–19, 21–19
Women's singles	(Japan) Saena Kawakami	(Indonesia) Fitriani	26–24, 18–21, 21–10
Men's doubles	(China) Li Junhui / Liu Yuchen	(China) Huang Kaixiang / Wang Sijie	21–8, 21–16
Women's doubles	(Thailand) Jongkolphan Kititharakul / Rawinda Prajongjai	(Indonesia) Suci Rizky Andini / Maretha Dea Giovani	21–14, 21–12
Mixed doubles	(China) Huang Kaixiang / Huang Dongping	(South Korea) Choi Sol-gyu / Chae Yoo-jung	21–19, 21–12

=== Dutch Open ===
Category	Winners	Runners-up	Score
Men's singles	(India) Ajay Jayaram	(Estonia) Raul Must	21–12, 21–18
Women's singles	(Scotland) Kirsty Gilmour	(Germany) Karin Schnaase	21–16, 21–13
Men's doubles	(Malaysia) Koo Kien Keat / Tan Boon Heong	(India) Manu Attri / B. Sumeeth Reddy	21–15, 21–10
Women's doubles	(Bulgaria) Gabriela Stoeva / Stefani Stoeva	(Netherlands) Eefje Muskens / Selena Piek	24–22, 21–15
Mixed doubles	(France) Ronan Labar / Émilie Lefel	(Thailand) Sudket Prapakamol / Saralee Thungthongkam	21–10, 21–18

=== Chinese Taipei Masters ===
Category	Winners	Runners-up	Score
Men's singles	(Indonesia) Sony Dwi Kuncoro	(Chinese Taipei) Wang Tzu-wei	21–13, 21–15
Women's singles	(South Korea) Lee Jang-mi	(South Korea) Kim Hyo-min	21–16, 21–16
Men's doubles	(Indonesia) Marcus Fernaldi Gideon / Kevin Sanjaya Sukamuljo	(Malaysia) Hoon Thien How / Lim Khim Wah	21–12, 21–8
Women's doubles	(Indonesia) Anggia Shitta Awanda / Ni Ketut Mahadewi Istarani	(Japan) Shiho Tanaka / Koharu Yonemoto	21–19, 21–14
Mixed doubles	(Indonesia) Ronald Alexander / Melati Daeva Oktavianti	(Chinese Taipei) Chang Ko-chi / Chang Hsin-tien	21–18, 25–27, 21–15

=== Scottish Open ===
Category	Winners	Runners-up	Score
Men's singles	(Denmark) Hans-Kristian Vittinghus	(England) Rajiv Ouseph	21–19, 11–21, 21–16
Women's singles	(Denmark) Line Kjærsfeldt	(Scotland) Kirsty Gilmour	16–21, 21–16, 21–18
Men's doubles	(Germany) Michael Fuchs / Johannes Schöttler	(England) Andrew Ellis / Peter Mills	21–15, 21–18
Women's doubles	(Japan) Yuki Fukushima / Sayaka Hirota	(Netherlands) Samantha Barning / Iris Tabeling	21–14, 14–11 Retired
Mixed doubles	(Russia) Vitalij Durkin / Nina Vislova	(France) Ronan Labar / Émilie Lefel	21–14, 21–12

=== Brazil Open ===
Category	Winners	Runners-up	Score
Men's singles	(China) Lin Dan	(Spain) Pablo Abián	21–13, 21–17
Women's singles	(China) Shen Yaying	(China) Li Yun	20–22, 21–17, 24–22
Men's doubles	(China) Huang Kaixiang / Zheng Siwei	(China) Wang Yilyu / Zhang Wen	22–24, 21–10, 21–14
Women's doubles	(China) Chen Qingchen / Jia Yifan	(Netherlands) Eefje Muskens / Selena Piek	21–17, 21–14
Mixed doubles	(China) Zheng Siwei / Chen Qingchen	(Russia) Evgenij Dremin / Evgenia Dimova	21–12, 21–10

=== U.S. Grand Prix ===
Category	Winners	Runners-up	Score
Men's singles	(South Korea) Lee Hyun-il	(England) Rajiv Ouseph	21–19, 21–12
Women's singles	(Chinese Taipei) Pai Yu-po	(Scotland) Kirsty Gilmour	18–21, 21–15, 21–15
Men's doubles	(Malaysia) Goh V Shem / Tan Wee Kiong	(Russia) Vladimir Ivanov / Ivan Sozonov	21–14, 21–17
Women's doubles	(South Korea) Jung Kyung-eun / Shin Seung-chan	(South Korea) Chang Ye-na / Lee So-hee	24–22, 18–21, 21–12
Mixed doubles	(South Korea) Choi Sol-gyu / Eom Hye-won	(Germany) Michael Fuchs / Birgit Michels	21–12, 21–14

=== Mexico City ===
Category	Winners	Runners-up	Score
Men's singles	(South Korea) Lee Dong-keun	(Thailand) Pannawit Thongnuam	19–21, 21–13, 21–12
Women's singles	(Japan) Sayaka Sato	(South Korea) Bae Yeon-ju	21–15, 21–9
Men's doubles	(India) Manu Attri / B. Sumeeth Reddy	(Thailand) Bodin Isara / Nipitphon Phuangphuapet	22–20, 21–18
Women's doubles	(Japan) Shizuka Matsuo / Mami Naito	(Thailand) Puttita Supajirakul / Sapsiree Taerattanachai	21–17, 16–21, 21–10
Mixed doubles	(Malaysia) Chan Peng Soon / Goh Liu Ying	(South Korea) Choi Sol-gyu / Eom Hye-won	21–14, 21–12
