= 2015 Mexico City Grand Prix =

Tournament details
- Dates: 15 December 2015 – 20 December 2015
- Level: Grand Prix
- Total prize money: US$50,000
- Venue: Centro Deportivo Chapultepec
- Location: Mexico City, Mexico

Champions
- Men's singles: (South Korea) Lee Dong-keun
- Women's singles: (Japan) Sayaka Sato
- Men's doubles: (India) Manu Attri (India) B. Sumeeth Reddy
- Women's doubles: (Japan) Shizuka Matsuo (Japan) Mami Naito
- Mixed doubles: (Malaysia) Chan Peng Soon (Malaysia) Goh Liu Ying

The 2015 Mexico City Grand Prix was the last grand prix tournament of the 2015 BWF Grand Prix Gold and Grand Prix calendar. The tournament was held in Mexico City, Mexico from December 15 until December 20, 2015, and had a total purse of US$50,000.

== Men's singles ==
=== Seeds ===
1. (India) Ajay Jayaram (quarterfinals)
2. (Japan) Sho Sasaki (semifinals)
3. (South Korea) Lee Dong-keun (champion)
4. (Thailand) Boonsak Ponsana (second round)
5. (Thailand) Tanongsak Saensomboonsuk (Withdrew)
6. (Spain) Pablo Abian (First round)
7. (Malaysia) Zulfadli Zulkiffli (Quarterfinals)
8. (Japan) Kenichi Tago (Withdrew)

=== Finals ===
Semifinals
(Ukraine) Artem Pochtarov	16	21	17
(Thailand) Pannawit Thongnuam	21	16	21
3	(South Korea) Lee Dong-keun	21	11	21
2	(Japan) Sho Sasaki	18	21	15

Final
(Thailand) Pannawit Thongnuam	21	13	12
3	(South Korea) Lee Dong-keun	19	21	21

=== Section 1 ===
Round 1
1	(India) Ajay Jayaram
BYE
(Mexico) Ailton Correa	17	10
(Sri Lanka) Niluka Karunaratne	21	21
(Mexico) Alfredo Correa	21	6	9
(United States) Hock Lai Lee	18	21	21
(Czech Republic) Milan Ludík	21	21
(Mexico) Garrido Marcos	12	16
8	(Japan) Kenichi Tago
BYE
(Mexico) Lino Muñoz	21	21
(Germany) Jonathan Persson	15	17
(United States) Chan Yan Tuck	21	4	9
(Ukraine) Artem Pochtarov	16	21	21
(Mexico) Aaron Reyes	21	13	12
(Malaysia) Zulhelmi Zulkiffli	18	21	21

Round 2
1	(India) Ajay Jayaram	21	21
(Sri Lanka) Niluka Karunaratne	10	16
(United States) Hock Lai Lee	12	21	18
(Czech Republic) Milan Ludík	21	18	21
8	(Japan) Kenichi Tago	WO
(Mexico) Lino Muñoz
(Ukraine) Artem Pochtarov	21	11	21
(Malaysia) Zulhelmi Zulkiffli	17	21	16

Round 3
1	(India) Ajay Jayaram	21	21
(Czech Republic) Milan Ludík	12	11
(Mexico) Lino Muñoz	18	20
(Ukraine) Artem Pochtarov	21	22

Quarterfinals
1	(India) Ajay Jayaram	21	14	14
(Ukraine) Artem Pochtarov	12	21	21

=== Section 2 ===
Round 1
4	(Thailand) Boonsak Ponsana
BYE
(Vietnam) Nguyen Tien Minh	21	21
(Mexico) Juan Garcia	2	5
(Mexico) Eric Barron	9	13
(Canada) Martin Giuffre	21	21
(Mexico) Arturo Hernandez	21	13
(Brazil) Alex Yuwan Tjong	23	21
6	(Spain) Pablo Abian	18	18
(Thailand) Pannawit Thongnuam	21	21
(Slovakia) Matej Hlinican	13	10
(Austria) Luka Wraber	21	21
(United States) Bjorn Seguin
(Brazil) Daniel Paiola	WO
(Guatemala) Kevin Cordón	21	12	8
(Sweden) Henri Hurskainen	19	21	21

Round 2
4	(Thailand) Boonsak Ponsana	19	19
(Vietnam) Nguyen Tien Minh	21	21
(Canada) Martin Giuffre	19	21	21
(Brazil) Alex Yuwan Tjong	21	16	12
(Austria) Luka Wraber	11	16
(Thailand) Pannawit Thongnuam	21	21
(United States) Bjorn Seguin	14	14
(Sweden) Henri Hurskainen	21	21

Round 3
(Vietnam) Nguyen Tien Minh	21	21
(Canada) Martin Giuffre	12	14
(Thailand) Pannawit Thongnuam	19	21	21
(Sweden) Henri Hurskainen	21	13	15

Quarterfinals
(Vietnam) Nguyen Tien Minh	21	15	18
(Thailand) Pannawit Thongnuam	15	21	21

=== Section 3 ===
Round 1
(Slovenia) Iztok Utrosa	21	21
(Canada) Luke Couture	11	15
(Mexico) Jorge Rodriguez	5	4
(Brazil) Ygor de Oliveira	21	21
(Belgium) Yuhan Tan	21	21
(United States) Ryan Chew	16	18
(United States) Howard Shu
5	(Thailand) T Saensomboonsuk	WO
(Mexico) Mauricio Casillas	14	9
(Austria) David Obernosterer	21	21
(Czech Republic) Petr Koukal	10	21	21
(Sweden) Mattias Borg	21	19	16
(Mexico) Francisco Trevino	9	11
(Portugal) Pedro Martins	21	21
BYE
3	(South Korea) Lee Dong-keun

Round 2
(Slovenia) Iztok Utrosa	15	16
(Brazil) Ygor de Oliveira	21	21
(Belgium) Yuhan Tan
(United States) Howard Shu	WO
(Austria) David Obernosterer	15	13
(Czech Republic) Petr Koukal	21	21
(Portugal) Pedro Martins	21	15
3	(South Korea) Lee Dong-keun	23	21

Round 3
(Brazil) Ygor de Oliveira	21	15	21
(Belgium) Yuhan Tan	17	21	19
(Czech Republic) Petr Koukal	12	21	19
3	(South Korea) Lee Dong-keun	21	18	21

Quarterfinals
(Brazil) Ygor de Oliveira	16	13
3	(South Korea) Lee Dong-keun	21	21

=== Section 4 ===
Round 1
(Cuba) Osleni Guerrero	21	21
(Mexico) Andres Ramirez	14	8
(Guatemala) Ruben Castellanos	WO
(Iceland) Kari Gunnarsson	WO
(Guatemala) Rodolfo Ramírez	WO
(Mexico) Humberte Fajardo
BYE
7	(Malaysia) Zulfadli Zulkiffli
(Mexico) Job Castillo	20	21	21
(Israel) Misha Zilberman	22	9	13
(Italy) Rosario Maddaloni	17	13
(United States) Timothy Lam	21	21
(Mexico) Luis Garrido	21	13	21
(Slovakia) Jarolim Vicen	7	21	10
BYE
2	(Japan) Sho Sasaki

Round 2
(Cuba) Osleni Guerrero
BYE
(Mexico) Humberte Fajardo	17	15
7	(Malaysia) Zulfadli Zulkiffli	21	21
(Mexico) Job Castillo	21	21
(United States) Timothy Lam	17	18
(Mexico) Luis Garrido	16	9
2	(Japan) Sho Sasaki	21	21

Round 3
(Cuba) Osleni Guerrero	21	7	10
7	(Malaysia) Zulfadli Zulkiffli	17	21	21
(Mexico) Job Castillo	19	15
2	(Japan) Sho Sasaki	21	21

Quarterfinals
7	(Malaysia) Zulfadli Zulkiffli	12	12
2	(Japan) Sho Sasaki	21	21

== Women's singles ==
=== Seeds ===
1. (Japan) Nozomi Okuhara (Withdrew)
2. (South Korea) Bae Yeon-ju (Flnals)
3. (Canada) Michelle Li (first round)
4. (Thailand) Busanan Ongbumrungpan (third round)
5. (Japan) Minatsu Mitani (second round)
6. (Japan) Yui Hashimoto (Withdrew)
7. (Japan) Sayaka Sato (champion)
8. (Scotland) Kirsty Gilmour (third round)

=== Finals ===
Semifinals
7	(Japan) Sayaka Sato	21	21
(Thailand) Porntip Buranaprasertsuk	13	17
(Russia) Natalia Perminova	21	12	17
2	(South Korea) Bae Yeon-ju	17	21	21

Final
7	(Japan) Sayaka Sato	21	21
2	(South Korea) Bae Yeon-ju	15	9

=== Top half ===
Round 1
(Mexico) Cynthia Gonzalez	12	16
(Brazil) Fabiana Silva	21	21
(Hungary) Laura Sarosi	21	21
(Austria) Elisabeth Baldauf	14	9
7	(Japan) Sayaka Sato	21	21
(United States) Iris Wang	17	12
(Vietnam) Vu Thi Trang	21	21
(Australia) Melinda Sun	6	18
3	(Canada) Michelle Li	18	15
(Thailand) P Buranaprasertsuk	21	21
(Thailand) Nitchaon Jindapol	21	21
(Peru) Dánica Nishimura	9	7
(United States) Disha Gupta	16	17
(Mexico) Adriana Valero	21	21
(Mexico) Sabrina Solis	10	12
(Italy) Jeanine Cicognini	21	21

Round 2
(Brazil) Fabiana Silva	21	10	21
(Hungary) Laura Sarosi	15	21	17
7	(Japan) Sayaka Sato	21	21
(Vietnam) Vu Thi Trang	13	8
(Thailand) P Buranaprasertsuk	21	16	21
(Thailand) Nitchaon Jindapol	9	21	7
(Mexico) Adriana Valero	10	11
(Italy) Jeanine Cicognini	21	21

Round 3
(Brazil) Fabiana Silva	5	10
7	(Japan) Sayaka Sato	21	21
(Thailand) P Buranaprasertsuk	21	18	21
(Italy) Jeanine Cicognini	19	21	8

Quarterfinals
7	(Japan) Sayaka Sato	21	21
(Thailand) P Buranaprasertsuk	13	17

=== Bottom half ===
Round 1
(Russia) Natalia Perminova	21	21
(Mexico) Adelina Quiñones	6	7
(Mexico) Anahi de la Torre	7	5
5	(Japan) Minatsu Mitani	21	21
(Mexico) Haramara Gaitan	22	22
(Mexico) Mariana Ugalde	20	20
(Lithuania) Akvile Stapusaityte	9	21	17
4	(Thailand) B Ongbumrungpan	21	7	21
(Finland) Nanna Vainio	15	15
(Portugal) Telma Santos	21	21
(Mexico) Yaqueline Duarte	4	11
8	(Scotland) Kirsty Gilmour	21	21
(Guatemala) Nikte Sotomayor	17	15
(Brazil) Lohaynny Vicente	21	21
(Peru) Daniela Macías	7	9
2	(South Korea) Bae Yeon-ju	21	21

Round 2
(Russia) Natalia Perminova	16	21	21
5	(Japan) Minatsu Mitani	21	15	16
(Mexico) Mariana Ugalde	13	11
4	(Thailand) B Ongbumrungpan	21	21
(Portugal) Telma Santos	9	21	9
8	(Scotland) Kirsty Gilmour	21	19	21
(Brazil) Lohaynny Vicente	7	12
2	(South Korea) Bae Yeon-ju	21	21

Round 3
(Russia) Natalia Perminova	23	21	21
4	(Thailand) B Ongbumrungpan	25	15	15
8	(Scotland) Kirsty Gilmour	13	12
2	(South Korea) Bae Yeon-ju	21	21

Quarterfinals
(Russia) Natalia Perminova	21	12	17
2	(South Korea) Bae Yeon-ju	17	21	21

== Men's doubles ==
=== Seeds ===
1. (Russia) Vladimir Ivanov / Ivan Sozonov (Withdrew)
2. (Malaysia) Goh V Shem / Tan Wee Kiong (semi-final)
3. (India) Manu Attri / B. Sumeeth Reddy (champion)
4. (England) Marcus Ellis / Chris Langridge

=== Finals ===
Semifinals

Final

- (Thailand) Puavaranukroh Dechapol
- (Thailand) Kedren Kittinupong
24
15
8

3
- (India) Manu Attri
- (India) B. Sumeeth Reddy
22
21
21

3
- (India) Manu Attri
- (India) B. Sumeeth Reddy
22
21

- (Thailand) Bodin Issara
- (Thailand) Nipitphon Puangpuapech
20
18

- (Thailand) Bodin Issara
- (Thailand) Nipitphon Puangpuapech
21
21

2
- (Malaysia) Goh V Shem
- (Malaysia) Tan Wee Kiong
19
18

=== Top half ===
Round 1

Round 2

Round 3

Quarterfinals

1
- (Russia) Vladimir Ivanov
- (Russia) Ivan Sozonov

BYE

1
- (Russia) Vladimir Ivanov
- (Russia) Ivan Sozonov
WO

- (United States) Phillip Chew
- (United States) S Pongnairat
21
23

- (United States) Phillip Chew
- (United States) S Pongnairat

- (Canada) Adrian Liu
- (Canada) Derrick Ng
18
21

- (United States) Phillip Chew
- (United States) S Pongnairat
18
12

- (Mexico) Ailton Correa
- (Mexico) Francisco Trevino

- (Thailand) P Dechapol
- (Thailand) K Kittinupong
21
21

BYE

- (Mexico) Ailton Correa
- (Mexico) Francisco Trevino
8
13

- (Thailand) P Dechapol
- (Thailand) K Kittinupong

- (Thailand) P Dechapol
- (Thailand) K Kittinupong
21
21

- (Brazil) Daniel Paiola
- (Brazil) Alex Yuwan Tjong
WO

- (Thailand) P Dechapol
- (Thailand) K Kittinupong
24
15
8

3
- (India) Manu Attri
- (India) B. Sumeeth Reddy

3
- (India) Manu Attri
- (India) B. Sumeeth Reddy
22
21
21

BYE

3
- (India) Manu Attri
- (India) B. Sumeeth Reddy
21
21

- (England) Andrew Ellis
- (England) Peter Mills
WO

- (Mexico) Job Castillo
- (Mexico) Lino Muñoz
17
13

- (Mexico) Job Castillo
- (Mexico) Lino Muñoz

3
- (India) Manu Attri
- (India) B. Sumeeth Reddy
21
21

- (Ukraine) Artem Pochtarov
- (Slovenia) Iztok Utrosa

- (United States) Ryan Chew
- (Indonesia) Fran Kurniawan
12
17

BYE

- (Ukraine) Artem Pochtarov
- (Slovenia) Iztok Utrosa
13
16

- (Malaysia) Zulfaz bin Zulkiffli
- (Malaysia) Zulhemi Zulkiffli
19
14^{r}

- (United States) Ryan Chew
- (Indonesia) Fran Kurniawan
21
21

- (United States) Ryan Chew
- (Indonesia) Fran Kurniawan
21
17

=== Bottom half ===
Round 1

Round 2

Round 3

Quarterfinals

- (Belgium) Matijs Dierickx
- (Belgium) Freek Golinski
21
21

- (Scotland) Alistair Casey
- (United States) Dean Schoppe
18
11

- (Belgium) Matijs Dierickx
- (Belgium) Freek Golinski
11
12

- (Thailand) Bodin Issara
- (Thailand) N Puangpuapech
21
21

- (Thailand) Bodin Issara
- (Thailand) N Puangpuapech
21
21

- (India) Alwin Francis
- (India) Kona Tarun
16
15

- (Thailand) Bodin Issara
- (Thailand) N Puangpuapech
21
23

- (Mexico) Mauricio Casillas
- (Mexico) Arturo Hernandez

4
- (England) Marcus Ellis
- (England) Chris Langridge
15
21

- (France) Baptiste Careme
- (France) Ronan Labar
WO

- (Mexico) Mauricio Casillas
- (Mexico) Arturo Hernandez
10
7

BYE

4
- (England) Marcus Ellis
- (England) Chris Langridge
21
21

4
- (England) Marcus Ellis
- (England) Chris Langridge

- (Thailand) Bodin Issara
- (Thailand) N Puangpuapech
21
21

- (Mexico) Luis Garrido
- (Mexico) Marcos Garrido
11
9

2
- (Malaysia) Goh V Shem
- (Malaysia) Tan Wee Kiong
19
18

- (Germany) Michael Fuchs
- (Germany) J Schoettler
21
21

- (Germany) Michael Fuchs
- (Germany) J Schoettler

BYE

- (Guatemala) Solis Jonathan
- (Guatemala) Rodolfo Ramírez
WO

- (Guatemala) Solis Jonathan
- (Guatemala) Rodolfo Ramírez

- (Germany) Michael Fuchs
- (Germany) J Schoettler
19
21
9

- (United States) Mathew Fogarty
- (United States) Bjorn Seguin

2
- (Malaysia) Goh V Shem
- (Malaysia) Tan Wee Kiong
21
14
21

- (Slovakia) Matej Hlinican
- (Germany) Jonathan Persson
WO

- (United States) Mathew Fogarty
- (United States) Bjorn Seguin
15
11

BYE

2
- (Malaysia) Goh V Shem
- (Malaysia) Tan Wee Kiong
21
21

2
- (Malaysia) Goh V Shem
- (Malaysia) Tan Wee Kiong

== Women's doubles ==
=== Seeds ===
1. (Malaysia) Vivian Hoo Kah Mun / Woon Khe Wei
2. (South Korea) Chang Ye-na / Lee So-hee
3. (Japan) Naoko Fukuman / Kurumi Yonao
4. (South Korea) Go Ah-ra / Yoo Hae-won

=== Finals ===
Semifinals

Final

1
- (Malaysia) Vivian Hoo Kah Mun
- (Malaysia) Woon Khe Wei
16
21

- (Japan) Shizuka Matsuo
- (Japan) Mami Naito
21
23

- (Japan) Shizuka Matsuo
- (Japan) Mami Naito
21
16
21

- (Thailand) Puttita Supajirakul
- (Thailand) Sapsiree Taerattanachai
17
21
10

- (Thailand) Puttita Supajirakul
- (Thailand) Sapsiree Taerattanachai
21
12
21

2
- (South Korea) Chang Ye-na
- (South Korea) Lee So-hee
16
21
19

=== Top half ===
Round 1

Round 2

Round 3

Quarterfinals

1
- (Malaysia) Vivian Hoo K M
- (Malaysia) Woon Khe Wei

BYE

1
- (Malaysia) Vivian Hoo K M
- (Malaysia) Woon Khe Wei
21
21

- (Mexico) Yaqueline Duarte
- (Mexico) Adelina Quiñones

- (Mexico) Yaqueline Duarte
- (Mexico) Adelina Quiñones
3
6

BYE

1
- (Malaysia) Vivian Hoo K M
- (Malaysia) Woon Khe Wei
17
21
21

- (England) Heather Olver
- (England) Lauren Smith

- (England) Heather Olver
- (England) Lauren Smith
21
11
17

BYE

- (England) Heather Olver
- (England) Lauren Smith
21
21

- (Peru) Daniela Macías
- (Peru) Dánica Nishimura
21
23

- (Peru) Daniela Macías
- (Peru) Dánica Nishimura
10
15

- (Mexico) Haramara Gaitan
- (Mexico) Sabrina Solis
12
21

1
- (Malaysia) Vivian Hoo K M
- (Malaysia) Woon Khe Wei
16
21

4
- (South Korea) Go Ah-ra
- (South Korea) Yoo Hae-won

- (Japan) Shizuka Matsuo
- (Japan) Mami Naito
21
23

BYE

4
- (South Korea) Go Ah-ra
- (South Korea) Yoo Hae-won
WO

- (France) Audrey Fontaine
- (France) Anne Tran

- (France) Audrey Fontaine
- (France) Anne Tran

BYE

- (France) Audrey Fontaine
- (France) Anne Tran
8
9

- (Thailand) J Kititharakul
- (Thailand) R Prajongjai

- (Japan) Shizuka Matsuo
- (Japan) Mami Naito
21
21

BYE

- (Thailand) J Kititharakul
- (Thailand) R Prajongjai
17
20

- (Germany) Isabel Herttrich
- (Germany) Birgit Michels
20
18

- (Japan) Shizuka Matsuo
- (Japan) Mami Naito
21
22

- (Japan) Shizuka Matsuo
- (Japan) Mami Naito
22
21

=== Bottom half ===
Round 1

Round 2

Round 3

Quarterfinals

- (Brazil) Lohaynny Vicente
- (Brazil) Luana Vicente
21
21

- (Mexico) Anahi de la Torre
- (Mexico) Adriana Valero
15
8

- (Brazil) Lohaynny Vicente
- (Brazil) Luana Vicente
21
21

BYE

- (Mexico) Cynthia Gonzalez
- (Mexico) Mariana Ugalde
9
10

- (Mexico) Cynthia Gonzalez
- (Mexico) Mariana Ugalde

- (Brazil) Lohaynny Vicente
- (Brazil) Luana Vicente
9
20

- (Malaysia) Amelia Alicia Anscelly
- (Malaysia) Soong Fie Cho
14
15

- (Thailand) P Supajirakul
- (Thailand) S Taerattanachai
21
22

- (Thailand) P Supajirakul
- (Thailand) S Taerattanachai
21
21

- (Thailand) P Supajirakul
- (Thailand) S Taerattanachai

BYE

3
- (Japan) Naoko Fukuman
- (Japan) Kurumi Yonao
WO

3
- (Japan) Naoko Fukuman
- (Japan) Kurumi Yonao

- (Thailand) P Supajirakul
- (Thailand) S Taerattanachai
21
12
21

- (South Korea) Jung Kyung-eun
- (South Korea) Shin Seung-chan
21
22
21

2
- (South Korea) Chang Ye-na
- (South Korea) Lee So-hee
16
21
19

- (France) Marie Batomene
- (France) Emilie Lefel
13
24
12

- (South Korea) Jung Kyung-eun
- (South Korea) Shin Seung-chan

BYE

- (United States) Eva Lee
- (United States) P L Obanana
WO

- (United States) Eva Lee
- (United States) P L Obanana

- (South Korea) Jung Kyung-eun
- (South Korea) Shin Seung-chan
18
7

BYE

2
- (South Korea) Chang Ye-na
- (South Korea) Lee So-hee
21
21

- (Canada) Alex Bruce
- (Canada) Phyllis Chan

- (Canada) Alex Bruce
- (Canada) Phyllis Chan
18
15

BYE

2
- (South Korea) Chang Ye-na
- (South Korea) Lee So-hee
21
21

2
- (South Korea) Chang Ye-na
- (South Korea) Lee So-hee

== Mixed doubles ==
=== Seeds ===
1. (Germany) Michael Fuchs / Birgit Michels
2. (Malaysia) Chan Peng Soon / Goh Liu Ying (champion)
3. (Singapore) Danny Bawa Chrisnanta / Vanessa Neo Yu Yan
4. (South Korea) Choi Sol-kyu / Eom Hye-won

=== Finals ===
Semifinals

Final

- (Sweden) Nico Ruponen
- (Sweden) Amanda Hogstrom
15
21
13

4
- (South Korea) Choi Sol-kyu
- (South Korea) Eom Hye-won
21
18
21

4
- (South Korea) Choi Sol-kyu
- (South Korea) Eom Hye-won
14
12

2
- (Malaysia) Chan Peng Soon
- (Malaysia) Goh Liu Ying
21
21

3
- (Singapore) Danny Bawa Chrisnanta
- (Singapore) Vanessa Neo Yu Yan
14
13

2
- (Malaysia) Chan Peng Soon
- (Malaysia) Goh Liu Ying
21
21

=== Top half ===
Round 1

Round 2

Round 3

Quarterfinals

1
- (Germany) Michael Fuchs
- (Germany) Birgit Michels

BYE

1
- (Germany) Michael Fuchs
- (Germany) Birgit Michels
17
14

- (Austria) David Obernosterer
- (Austria) Elisabeth Baldauf
19
16

- (Thailand) Sudket Prapakamol
- (Thailand) S Thoungthongkam
21
21

- (Thailand) Sudket Prapakamol
- (Thailand) S Thoungthongkam
21
21

- (Thailand) Sudket Prapakamol
- (Thailand) S Thoungthongkam
19
22
17

- (Sweden) Nico Ruponen
- (Sweden) Amanda Hogstrom

- (Sweden) Nico Ruponen
- (Sweden) Amanda Hogstrom
21
20
21

BYE

- (Sweden) Nico Ruponen
- (Sweden) Amanda Hogstrom
21
13
21

- (United States) Chan Yan Tuck
- (United States) Yuko Kawasaki
7
3

- (Canada) Toby Ng
- (Canada) Alex Bruce
18
21
17

- (Canada) Toby Ng
- (Canada) Alex Bruce
21
21

- (Sweden) Nico Ruponen
- (Sweden) Amanda Hogstrom
15
21
13

4
- (South Korea) Choi Sol-gyu
- (South Korea) Eom Hye-won

4
- (South Korea) Choi Sol-gyu
- (South Korea) Eom Hye-won
21
18
21

BYE

4
- (South Korea) Choi Sol-gyu
- (South Korea) Eom Hye-won
21
21

- (Japan) Keigo Sonoda
- (Japan) Naoko Fukuman
WO

- (Mexico) Humberte Fajardo
- (Mexico) Yesenia Duarte
7
4

- (Mexico) Humberte Fajardo
- (Mexico) Yesenia Duarte

4
- (South Korea) Choi Sol-gyu
- (South Korea) Eom Hye-won
23
21

- (France) Ronan Labar
- (South Korea) Emilie Lefel

- (Indonesia) Fran Kurniawan
- (Indonesia) Komala Dewi
21
10

BYE

- (France) Ronan Labar
- (South Korea) Emilie Lefel
15
20

- (Brazil) Alex Yuwan Tjong
- (Brazil) Luana Vicente
18
12

- (Indonesia) Fran Kurniawan
- (Indonesia) Komala Dewi
21
22

- (Indonesia) Fran Kurniawan
- (Indonesia) Komala Dewi
21
21

=== Bottom half ===
Round 1

Round 2

Round 3

Quarterfinals

- (Germany) Jonathan Persson
- (Mexico) Cynthia Gonzalez
19
19

- (United States) Phillip Chew
- (United States) Jamie Subandhi
21
21

- (United States) Phillip Chew
- (United States) Jamie Subandhi
13
17

BYE

- (Russia) Evgenij Dremin
- (Russia) Evgenia Dimova
21
21

- (Russia) Evgenij Dremin
- (Russia) Evgenia Dimova

- (Russia) Evgenij Dremin
- (Russia) Evgenia Dimova
21
16
11

- (France) G Mittelhaiser
- (France) Audrey Fontaine

3
- (Singapore) D B Chrisnanta
- (Singapore) Vanessa Neo Y Y
15
21
21

- (Guatemala) Ruben Castellanos
- (Guatemala) Nikte Sotomayor
WO

- (France) G Mittelhaiser
- (France) Audrey Fontaine
17
12

BYE

3
- (Singapore) D B Chrisnanta
- (Singapore) Vanessa Neo Y Y
21
21

3
- (Singapore) D B Chrisnanta
- (Singapore) Vanessa Neo Y Y

3
- (Singapore) D B Chrisnanta
- (Singapore) Vanessa Neo Y Y
14
13

- (Japan) Kenta Kazuno
- (Japan) Ayane Kurihara
21
21

2
- (Malaysia) Chan Peng Soon
- (Malaysia) Goh Liu Ying
21
21

- (United States) Hock Lai Lee
- (Canada) Phyllis Chan
14
16

- (Japan) Kenta Kazuno
- (Japan) Ayane Kurihara
21
21

BYE

- (Scotland) Alistair Casey
- (Australia) Melinda Sun
14
12

- (Scotland) Alistair Casey
- (Australia) Melinda Sun

- (Japan) Kenta Kazuno
- (Japan) Ayane Kurihara
14
21
16

- (Thailand) P Dechapol
- (Thailand) S Taerattanachai

2
- (Malaysia) Chan Peng Soon
- (Malaysia) Goh Liu Ying
21
7
21

- (France) Baptiste Careme
- (France) Anne Tran
WO

- (Thailand) P Dechapol
- (Thailand) S Taerattanachai
21
15

BYE

2
- (Malaysia) Chan Peng Soon
- (Malaysia) Goh Liu Ying
23
21

2
- (Malaysia) Chan Peng Soon
- (Malaysia) Goh Liu Ying

Preceded by 2015 U.S. Open Grand Prix	BWF Grand Prix Gold and Grand Prix; 2015 season	Succeeded by 2016 Malaysia Masters Grand Prix Gold
