= Gungal =

Gungal may refer to:

- Gungal, Ranga Reddy, village in India
- Gungal, New South Wales, locality in Australia
