= Jesús Arturo Barajas López =

Mexican badminton player (born 2000)

Jesús Barajas
Personal information
- Born: Jesús Arturo Barajas López; 17 March 2000 (age 26)

Sport
- Country: Mexico
- Sport: Badminton

Men's singles & doubles
- Highest ranking: 862 (MS 27 August 2015); 324 (MD 29 September 2016); 600 (XD 22 September 2016)
- BWF profile

Jesús Arturo Barajas López (born 17 March 2000) is a Mexican badminton player.

== Achievements ==
=== BWF International Challenge/Series ===
Men's doubles

Year	Tournament	Partner	Opponent	Score	Result	Ref
2016	Internacional Mexicano	(Mexico) Luis Montoya	(Mexico) Mauricio Casillas (Mexico) Arturo Hernández	21–18, 17–21, 22–20	(gold) Winner	

BWF International Challenge tournament
BWF International Series tournament
BWF Future Series tournament
