= Pannawit Thongnuam =

Thai badminton player (born 1995)

Personal information
- Born: 24 December 1995 (age 30)

Sport
- Country: Thailand
- Sport: Badminton
- Handedness: Right

Men's Singles
- Highest ranking: 59 (15 June 2017)
- Current ranking: 67 (30 August 2017)
- BWF profile
Medal record
Badminton
Representing Thailand
Summer Universiade
Bronze medal – third place	2017 Taipei	Men's singles
Bronze medal – third place	2017 Taipei	Mixed team

Pannawit Thongnuam (Thai: ปัณณวิชญ์ ทองน่วม; born 24 December 1995) is a Thai male badminton player. He plays in the men's singles. He won his first international title at the 2017 Smiling Fish International tournament. At the Taipei Universiade, he won two bronze medals in the men's singles and team event. He also was the runner-up at the 2015 Mexico City Grand Prix.

== Achievement ==
=== Summer Universiade ===
Men's singles
Year	Venue	Opponent	Score	Result
2017	Taipei Gymnasium; Taipei, Taiwan	(Japan) Kenta Nishimoto	19–21, 14–21	Bronze

=== BWF Grand Prix ===
The BWF Grand Prix has two level such as Grand Prix and Grand Prix Gold. It is a series of badminton tournaments, sanctioned by Badminton World Federation (BWF) since 2007.

Men's singles
Year	Tournament	Opponent	Score	Result
2015	Mexico City Grand Prix	(South Korea) Lee Dong-keun	21-19, 13-21, 12–21	(silver) Runner up

BWF Grand Prix Gold tournament
BWF Grand Prix tournament

=== BWF International Challenge/Series ===
Men's singles
Year	Tournament	Opponent	Score	Result
2017	Smiling Fish International	(Japan) Riichi Takeshita	21-19, 24–22	(gold) Winner

BWF International Challenge tournament
BWF International Series tournament
