= B. Sumeeth Reddy =

Indian badminton player (born 1991)

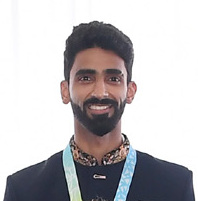
- Reddy in August 2022

Personal information
- Born: 26 September 1991 (age 35) Gungal, Ranga Reddy, Telangana, India
- Height: 1.82 m (6 ft 0 in)
- Spouse: N. Sikki Reddy (m. 2019)

Sport
- Country: India
- Sport: Badminton
- Handedness: Right
- Retired: 2025

Men's & mixed doubles
- Highest ranking: 17 (MD with Manu Attri, 30 July 2015); 25 (XD with N. Sikki Reddy, 18 March 2025)
- Current ranking: 25 (XD with N. Sikki Reddy, 18 March 2025)
- BWF profile
Medal record
Men's badminton
Representing India
Commonwealth Games
Silver medal – second place	2022 Birmingham	Mixed team
Asia Team Championships
Bronze medal – third place	2016 Hyderabad	Men's team
South Asian Games
Gold medal – first place	2016 Guwahati–Shillong	Men's doubles
Gold medal – first place	2016 Guwahati–Shillong	Men's team
Gold medal – first place	2019 Kathmandu–Pokhara	Men's team

B. Sumeeth Reddy (born 26 September 1991) is an Indian former badminton player. He was part of Indian team that clinched the gold medals in the 2016 and 2019 South Asian Games, and also claimed the men's doubles gold with Manu Attri in 2016. Reddy competed at the 2014 Asian Games, 2018 Asian Games; and at the 2016 Rio Summer Olympics in the men's doubles event, the first Indian to make it to Men's doubles event at the Olympics (along with Manu Attri) He retired from playing in March 2025 and became a doubles coach.

== Early life ==
Sumeeth Reddy was born on 26 September 1991 in Telangana, India. In order to make a career to badminton, Sumeeth's father sent him to the field of badminton sports in Hyderabad at the age of 10. He made his debut in the year 2007 by taking part in Asian Junior Championship. After the championship, he continued to play for singles till he was 20 years old. He had obtained the success in the total 7 National finals and was the best junior player at that time.

== Achievements ==
=== South Asian Games ===
Men's doubles
Year	Venue	Partner	Opponent	Score	Result
2016	Multipurpose Hall SAI–SAG Centre; Shillong, India	(India) Manu Attri	(India) Pranav Chopra (India) Akshay Dewalkar	21–18, 21–17	Gold

=== BWF Grand Prix (2 titles, 3 runners-up) ===
The BWF Grand Prix had two levels, the Grand Prix and Grand Prix Gold. It was a series of badminton tournaments sanctioned by the Badminton World Federation (BWF) and played between 2007 and 2017.

Men's doubles
Year	Tournament	Partner	Opponent	Score	Result
2015	U.S. Open	(India) Manu Attri	(China) Li Junhui (China) Liu Yuchen	12–21, 16–21	(silver) Runner-up
2015	Dutch Open	(India) Manu Attri	(Malaysia) Koo Kien Keat (Malaysia) Tan Boon Heong	15–21, 10–21	(silver) Runner-up
2015	Mexico City Grand Prix	(India) Manu Attri	(Thailand) Bodin Isara (Thailand) Nipitphon Phuangphuapet	22–20, 21–18	(gold) Winner
2016	Canada Open	(India) Manu Attri	(Canada) Adrian Liu (Canada) Toby Ng	21–8, 21–14	(gold) Winner

Mixed doubles
Year	Tournament	Partner	Opponent	Score	Result
2017	Syed Modi International	(India) Ashwini Ponnappa	(India) Pranav Chopra (India) N. Sikki Reddy	20–22, 10–21	(silver) Runner-up

BWF Grand Prix Gold tournament
BWF Grand Prix tournament

=== BWF International Challenge/Series (10 titles, 9 runners-up) ===
Men's singles
Year	Tournament	Opponent	Score	Result
2009	Iran Fajr International	(Iran) Mohammad Reza Kheradmandi	19–21, 21–17, 15–21	(silver) Runner-up

Men's doubles
Year	Tournament	Partner	Opponent	Score	Result
2013	Tata Open India International	(India) Manu Attri	(Chinese Taipei) Tien Tzu-chieh (Chinese Taipei) Wang Chi-lin	21–16, 21–13	(gold) Winner
2014	Sri Lanka International	(India) Manu Attri	(Singapore) Danny Bawa Chrisnanta (Singapore) Chayut Triyachart	17–21, 19–21	(silver) Runner-up
2014	Tata Open India International	(India) Manu Attri	(India) Ramchandran Shlok (India) Sanyam Shukla	21–15, 21–15	(gold) Winner
2015	Lagos International	(India) Manu Attri	(Poland) Adam Cwalina (Poland) Przemysław Wacha	21–17, 21–17	(gold) Winner
2015	Guatemala International	(India) Manu Attri	(Germany) Michael Fuchs (Germany) Johannes Schöttler	17–21, 13–21	(silver) Runner-up
2015	Belgian International	(India) Manu Attri	(Poland) Adam Cwalina (Poland) Przemysław Wacha	22–20, 19–21, 22–20	(gold) Winner
2015	Prague Open	(India) Manu Attri	(Poland) Adam Cwalina (Poland) Przemysław Wacha	21–19, 20–22, 14–21	(silver) Runner-up
2015	Bulgarian International	(India) Manu Attri	(Germany) Raphael Beck (Germany) Peter Käsbauer	14–21, 16–21	(silver) Runner-up
2016	Peru International	(India) Manu Attri	(Poland) Adam Cwalina (Poland) Przemysław Wacha	19–21, 21–18, 28–30	(silver) Runner-up
2017	Lagos International	(India) Manu Attri	(Nigeria) Godwin Olofua (Nigeria) Anuoluwapo Juwon Opeyori	21–13, 21–15	(gold) Winner
2018	Lagos International	(India) Manu Attri	(India) Vaibhaav (India) Prakash Raj	21–12, 21–12	(gold) Winner
2018	Tata Open India International	(India) Arjun M. R.	(Malaysia) Goh Sze Fei (Malaysia) Nur Izzuddin	21–10, 21–16	(gold) Winner
2019	Nepal International	(India) Manu Attri	(India) Arjun M. R. (India) Dhruv Kapila	21–19, 21–15	(gold) Winner
2019	India International	(India) Manu Attri	(Thailand) Chaloempon Charoenkitamorn (Thailand) Kittisak Namdash	21–15, 21–15	(gold) Winner
2022	Maldives International	(India) Rohan Kapoor	(Thailand) Chaloempon Charoenkitamorn (Thailand) Nanthakarn Yordphaisong	21–23, 21–19, 21–17	(gold) Winner

Mixed doubles
Year	Tournament	Partner	Opponent	Score	Result
2022	Bahrain International	(India) K. Maneesha	(Thailand) Ruttanapak Oupthong (Thailand) Jhenicha Sudjaipraparat	20–22, 17–21	(silver) Runner-up
2024	Iran Fajr International	(India) N. Sikki Reddy	(India) Sathish Kumar Karunakaran (India) Aadya Variyath	20–22, 14–21	(silver) Runner-up
2024	Azerbaijan International	(India) N. Sikki Reddy	(India) Sathish Kumar Karunakaran (India) Aadya Variyath	21–13, 20–22, 10–21	(silver) Runner-up

BWF International Challenge tournament
BWF International Series tournament

== Personal life ==
Sumeeth Reddy married his fellow badminton player N. Sikki Reddy in February 2019. The two had gotten engaged after the Syed Modi International in 2017.

Sumeeth studied at All Saints High School, Hyderabad.
