= Mauricio Casillas =

Mexican badminton player (born 1990)

Personal information
- Born: Mauricio Casillas Caballero; 20 August 1990 (age 36) Mexico City, Mexico

Sport
- Country: Mexico
- Sport: Badminton

Men's singles & doubles
- Highest ranking: 274 (MS 7 April 2011); 160 (MD 28 April 2016); 163 (XD 26 August 2010)
- BWF profile
Medal record
Men's badminton
Representing Mexico
Pan American Championships
Bronze medal – third place	2009 Guadalajara	Mixed team
Pan American Junior Championships
Silver medal – second place	2008 Guatemala City	Mixed team

Mauricio Casillas Caballero (born 20 August 1990) is a Mexican badminton player. In 2015, he represented IBM Mexico competed at the World Corporate Games in Mexico City, and won the men's singles and doubles event.

In 2023, he represented AWS Mexico competed at the World Company Sports Games in León, Guanajuato, winning 1st place.

== Achievements ==
=== BWF International Challenge/Series ===
Year	Tournament	Partner	Opponent	Score	Result
2009	Mexican International Cup Badminton	(Mexico) Lino Muñoz	(United States) Mathew Fogarty (United States) David Neuman	21-17,21-18	(bronze) Semifinalist
2009	Mexican International Cup Badminton	(Mexico) Marisol Dominguez	(Mexico) Jose Luis Gonzalez (Mexico) Naty Rangel	21-18,21-18	(bronze) Semifinalist
2010	Bill Graham Miami PanAm	NA	(Malaysia) Hock Lai Lee	21-12, 21–12	(bronze) Semifinalist
2010	Bill Graham Miami PanAm	(Mexico) Lino Muñoz	(Suriname) Virgil Soeroredjo (Suriname) Mitchel Wongsodikromo	26-24,8-21,10.21	(bronze) Semifinalist
2010	Internacional Mexicano	(Mexico) José Luis Gonzalez	(Mexico) Andrés López (Mexico) Lino Muñoz	26–28, 21–14, 14–21	(silver) Runner-up
2011	XII Torneo Giraldilla	(Mexico) Mariana Ugalde	(Indonesia) Christopher Rusdianto (Indonesia) Dwi Agustiawati	21-8, 21–11	(bronze) Semifinalist
2015	Internacional Mexicano	(Mexico) Arturo Hernández	(Brazil) Hugo Arthuso (Brazil) Daniel Paiola	21-10, 21–7	(bronze) Semifinalist
2016	Internacional Mexicano	(Mexico) Arturo Hernández	(Mexico) Jesús Barajas (Mexico) Luis Montoya	18–21, 21–17, 20–22	(silver) Runner-up

BWF International Challenge tournament
BWF International Series tournament
BWF Future Series tournament
