= Manu Attri =

Indian badminton player (born 1992)

Personal information
- Born: 31 December 1992 (age 33) Meerut, India
- Years active: 2008–present

Sport
- Country: India
- Sport: Badminton
- Handedness: Right

Men's doubles
- Highest ranking: 17 (23 December 2015)
- Current ranking: 81 (8 December 2022)
- BWF profile
Medal record
Men's badminton
Representing India
Asia Team Championships
Bronze medal – third place	2016 Hyderabad	Men's team
South Asian Games
Gold medal – first place	2016 Guwahati–Shillong	Men's doubles
Gold medal – first place	2016 Guwahati–Shillong	Men's team
Silver medal – second place	2016 Guwahati–Shillong	Mixed doubles

Manu Attri (born 31 December 1992) is an Indian badminton player who currently plays men's and mixed doubles. He partners with Jishnu Sanyal for men's doubles events and previously partnered with B. Sumeeth Reddy. For mixed doubles events, he partners with N. Siki Reddy, and previously, K. Maneesha. He competed at the 2014 Asian Games, and at the 2016 Summer Olympics.

== Career ==
=== 2010 ===
==== BWF World Junior Championships 2010 ====
Manu was a part of the Indian team that participated in the BWF World Junior Championship in 2010. India was placed in Group Z2 along with Denmark and the USA. India finished 9th in this tournament.

==== BWF Bimantara Cups World Junior Championships ====
Men's Doubles

with Prannoy H. S. (IND)

Round 1: vs Morten BRøDBæK & Nikolaj OVERGAARD (DEN) 19–21 12–21 Lost

Mixed Doubles

with Gauri Ghate (IND)

Round 1: Bye

Round 2: Seung Il CHOI & So Young PARK (KOR) 20–22 19–21 Lost

==== Maldives International Challenge 2010 ====
Men's Doubles

with Sanyal Jisnu (IND)

Round 1: Khanjani Mohammad Reza & Eskandari Vatannejad Soroush (IRI) 21–10 21–11 Win

Round 2: Fernando Eranga & Matarage Indika (SRI) 21–3 21–9 Win

Quarterfinals: Karunaratne Dinuka & Karunaratne Niluka (SRI)[4] 7–21 10–21 Lost

==== India Grand Prix Gold ====
Men's Doubles

with Sanyal Jisnu (IND)

Round 1: vs Marwan Saada Yasin & Marwan Saada Youssef (EGY) 21–2 21–12 Win

Round 2: vs Rizki Delynugraha Mochamad & Rijal Muhammad (INA) 18–21 7–21 Lost

=== 2011 ===
==== Badminton Asia Championships 2011 ====
Men's Doubles

with Sanyal Jisnu (IND)

Qualification 3 Semifinal: vs Quang Tuan Bui & Ha Anh Le (VIE) 21–15 21–9 Win

Qualification 3 Final: Prom Saravuth & Yongvannak Teav (CAM) 21–13 21–18 Win

Round 1: Bang Duc Bui & Manh Thang Dao (VIE) 23–25 21–14 14–21 Lost

==== Yonex-Sunrise India Open ====
Men's Doubles

with Sanyal Jisnu (IND)

Round 1: Bye

Round 2: Kien Keat Koo & Boon Heong Tan [1](MAS) 9–21 14–21 Lost

==== Maldives International Badminton Challenge 2011 ====
Men's Double

with Sanyal Jisnu (IND)

Round 1: Moosa Ahmed & Shafeeg Ibrahim (MDV) 21–6 21–8 Win

Round 2: Thasleem Ibrahim & Zuhury Ismail (MDV) 21–3 21–12 Win

Quarterfinal: Koch Jurgen & Zauner Peter (AUT) 19–21 18–21 Lost

==== Mauritius International 2011 ====
Men's Doubles

with Sanyal Jisnu (IND) seeded 2nd

Round 1: Bye

Round 2: Deeneshsing Baboolall & Yoni Louison (MRI) 21–14 21–15 Win

Quarterfinal: Aatish Lubah & Julien Paul (MRI) 21–12 21–9 Win

Semifinal: Giovanni Greco & Rosario Maddaloni [4] (ITA) 21–10 21–14 Win

Final: Dorian James & Willem Viljoen [1] (SA) 21–19 21–9 Win

==== Kenya International Series 2011 ====
with Sanyal Jisnu (IND) seeded 4th

Men's Doubles

Round 1: Bye

Round 2: Adamu Ibrahim & Elewa Olorunfemi (NIG) 21–13 21–11 Win

Quarterfinal: Emre Lale & Murat Sen (TUR) 21–11 21–10 Win

Semifinal: Jinkam Ifraimu Bulus & Ebenezer Olaluwa Fagbemi [2](NIG) 21–8 21–19 Win

Final: Dorian James & Willem Viljoen [1] (SA) 21–13 21–12 Win

==== Yonex Sunrise Vietnam Grand Prix Open 2011 ====
Men's Doubles

with Sanyal Jisnu (IND)

Round 1: Shen Low Juan & Jagdish Singh (MAS) 7–21 21–17 17–21 Lost

==== Yonex Chinese Taipei Open 2011 ====
Men's Doubles

with Sanyal Jisnu (IND)

Round 1: Alvent Yulianto Chandra & Hendra Aprida Gunawan [4](INA) 16–21 12–21 Lost

==== Li Ning China Masters ====
Men's Doubles

with Sanyal Jisnu (IND)

Round 1: Walkover

==== Yonex Open Japan ====
Men's Doubles

with Sanyal Jisnu (IND)

Round 1: Walkover

==== Yonex Dutch Open 2011 ====
Men's Doubles

with Sanyal Jisnu (IND)

Round 1: Walkover

==== Bangladesh International Series 2011 ====
Men's Doubles

with T. Hemanagendra Babu (IND)

Round 1: Bye

Round 2: Walkover

Mixed Doubles

with N. Sikki Reddy(IND)

Round 1: Walkover

==== Tata Open India International Challenge 2011 ====
Men's Doubles

with T. Hemanagendra Babu (IND)

Round 1: Bang Duc Bui & Manh Thang Dao (VIE) 19–21 21–12 16–21 Lost

Mixed Doubles

with N. Sikki Reddy(IND)

Round 1: Arun Vishnu & Aparna Balan [3] (IND) 15–21 10–21 Lost

==== Yonex – Sunrise Syed Modi Memorial India Open Grand Prix Gold ====
Men's Doubles

with T. Hemanagendra Babu (IND)

Round 1: Peng Soon Chan & Aik Quan Tan 15–21 19–21 Lost

Mixed Doubles

with N. Sikki Reddy(IND)

Round 1: Ha Anh Le & Thu Huyen Le (VIE) 21–14 21–10 Win

Round 2: V. Diju & Jwala Gutta [3] (IND) 14–21 11–21 Lost

=== 2012 ===
==== Iran Fajr International Challenge 2012 ====
He partnered with T. Hemanagendra Babu (IND) for the Men's doubles event. In round 1 they defeated the Iranian players Alireza Faghfouri & Mehran Shahbazi by 21–9 22–20. In round 2, the pair was defeated by Itani Kazuya & Tomoya Takashina from Japan with a score of 21–18 14–21 16–21.

==== Austrian International Challenge 2012 ====
Manu partnered with T. Hemanagendra Babu (IND) for the Men's doubles event. They defeated the German pair of Mark Flato & Patrick Kaemnitz in round 1 by 21–10 21–11. In round 2 they lost against 2nd seed host favourite Jurgen Koch & Peter Zauner by 14–21 10–21.

==== Yonex Sunrise India Open 2012 ====
He again went back to his partnership with Sanyal Jisnu for the Men's doubles event. The pair lost their 1st match against the Indonesian pair of Adam Cwalina & Michael Logosz by 13–21 17–21. For the mixed doubles, he paired up with N. Sikki Reddy. They were seeded 2nd in the tournament, but got knocked out by Danny Bawa Chrisnanta & Yu Yan Vanessa Neo from Singapore by 11–21 21–17 15–21 in round 1.

==== Russia Open Grand Prix 2012 ====
He partnered with Sanyal Jisnu for the Men's doubles event; the pair gave walkover to local pair of Yaroslav Egerev & Andrey Parokhodin in round 1.

==== White Nights 2012 ====
He partnered with Sanyal Jisnu for the Men's doubles event; the pair gave walkover in round 1.

==== Li Ning China Open 2012 ====
He started his new partnership with B. Sumeeth Reddy and entered in the qualification round for the Men's Doubles event. In round 1 of qualification, the pair got a bye, while in round 2 the Chinese pair of Guo Zhendong & Xu Chen gave them a walkover. The team qualified for the main draw, but eventually lost to Alvent Yulianto Chandra and Markis Kido from Indonesia by 17–21, 21–13, 11–21 in the 1st round.

==== Yonex Sunrise Hong Kong Open 2012 ====
He partnered with B. Sumeeth Reddy and entered in the qualification round of the men's doubles event. In Qualification Round 1, the pair defeated Lai Chein Cheng of Taipei and Joe Wu of New Zealand by 21–11 and 21–14. In Qualification Round 2, they knocked out 3rd seed Lee Chun Hei and Ng Ka Long from Hong Kong by 21–13, 13–21, 21–15 and qualified for the main draw.

In Round 1, the pair lost to Alvent Yulianto Chandra and Markis Kido from Indonesia by 21–11, 11–21, 15–21.

==== Kumpoo Macau Open Badminton Grand Prix Gold 2012 ====
He partnered with B. Sumeeth Reddy and entered in the qualification round of the men's doubles event. They lost to the top seed Taipei pair of Lu Ching Yao & Tseng Min Hao by 19–21 22–20 9–21 in the 1st round of qualification.

==== TATA Open India International Challenge 2012 ====
He partnered with B. Sumeeth Reddy and entered in the qualification round of Men's Doubles event as 4th seed. For Mixed Doubles, he partnered with K. Maneesha and entered into the main round.

In Qualification Round 1, Sumeeth and Manu defeated Chun Chun Hung and Sheng-Jie Yang from Taipei by 21–13 and 21–11. In Round 2, they played against Taipei pair of Tien Tzu Chieh and Yang Po Han by 21–16, 9–21, 21–19, qualifying them for the main round. They played against Indian pair of S. Sanjeeth and Jagadish Yadav and got past them with a 21–13, 21–13 victory. In Round 2, they faced the top-seeded Koran pair of Ko Sung Hyun and Lee Yong Dae and lost the match by 17–21, 9–21.

In Mixed Doubles Round 1, he along with Manisha faced 2nd seed Zhao Jiang, Terry Yeo and Dellis Yuliana from Indonesia and lost against them by 16–21 and 13–21.

==== Shaheed Dr. K.L. Garg – Syed Modi International India GPG 2012 ====
He partnered with B. Sumeeth Reddy and K. Maneesha respectively for Men's and Mixed Doubles events and received entries for the main round.

In Men's Doubles Round 1, they defeat French pair Ronan Laber and Mathias Quere by 21–15, 12–21, 21–15. In Round 2, they lost to 5th seed Gideon Markus Fernaldi and Agripinna Prima Rahmanto Putra from Indonesia by 19–21 and 11–21.

In Mixed Doubles, Manu-Maneesha lost against Zhao Jiang, Terry Yeo and Dellis Yuliana from Indonesia by 8–21 and 20–22.

=== 2015 ===
He won the Mexico City Grand Prix. He was runner up of Dutch open and US open grand prix gold. He won the Lagos International.

== Achievements ==
=== South Asian Games ===
Men's doubles
Year	Venue	Partner	Opponent	Score	Result
2016	Multipurpose Hall SAI–SAG Centre; Shillong, India	(India) B. Sumeeth Reddy	(India) Akshay Dewalkar (India) Pranav Chopra	21–18, 21–17	Gold

Mixed doubles
Year	Venue	Partner	Opponent	Score	Result
2016	Multipurpose Hall SAI–SAG Centre; Shillong, India	(India) Ashwini Ponnappa	(India) Pranav Chopra (India) N. Sikki Reddy	29–30, 17–21	Silver

=== BWF Grand Prix (2 titles, 3 runners-up) ===
The BWF Grand Prix had two levels, the Grand Prix and Grand Prix Gold. It was a series of badminton tournaments sanctioned by the Badminton World Federation (BWF) and played between 2007 and 2017.

Men's doubles
Year	Tournament	Partner	Opponent	Score	Result
2015	U.S. Open	(India) B. Sumeeth Reddy	(China) Li Junhui (China) Liu Yuchen	12–21, 16–21	(silver) Runner-up
2015	Dutch Open	(India) B. Sumeeth Reddy	(Malaysia) Koo Kien Keat (Malaysia) Tan Boon Heong	15–21, 10–21	(silver) Runner-up
2015	Mexico City Grand Prix	(India) B. Sumeeth Reddy	(Thailand) Bodin Isara (Thailand) Nipitphon Phuangphuapet	22–20, 21–18	(gold) Winner
2016	Canada Open	(India) B. Sumeeth Reddy	(Canada) Adrian Liu (Canada) Toby Ng	21–8, 21–14	(gold) Winner

Mixed doubles
Year	Tournament	Partner	Opponent	Score	Result
2015	Syed Modi International	(India) K. Maneesha	(Indonesia) Riky Widianto (Indonesia) Richi Puspita Dili	17–21, 17–21	(silver) Runner-up

BWF Grand Prix Gold tournament
BWF Grand Prix tournament

=== BWF International Challenge/Series (12 titles, 5 runners-up) ===
Men's doubles
Year	Tournament	Partner	Opponent	Score	Result
2011	Mauritius International	(India) Jishnu Sanyal	(South Africa) Dorian James (South Africa) Willem Viljoen	21–13, 21–12	(gold) Winner
2011	Kenya International	(India) Jishnu Sanyal	(South Africa) Dorian James (South Africa) Willem Viljoen	21–19, 21–9	(gold) Winner
2013	Tata Open India International	(India) B. Sumeeth Reddy	(Chinese Taipei) Tien Tzu-chieh (Chinese Taipei) Wang Chi-lin	21–16, 21–13	(gold) Winner
2014	Sri Lanka International	(India) B. Sumeeth Reddy	(Singapore) Danny Bawa Chrisnanta (Singapore) Chayut Triyachart	17–21, 19–21	(silver) Runner-up
2014	Tata Open India International	(India) B. Sumeeth Reddy	(India) Ramchandran Shlok (India) Sanyam Shukla	21–15, 21–15	(gold) Winner
2015	Lagos International	(India) B. Sumeeth Reddy	(Poland) Adam Cwalina (Poland) Przemysław Wacha	21–17, 21–17	(gold) Winner
2015	Guatemala International	(India) B. Sumeeth Reddy	(Germany) Michael Fuchs (Germany) Johannes Schöttler	17–21, 13–21	(silver) Runner-up
2015	Belgian International	(India) B. Sumeeth Reddy	(Poland) Adam Cwalina (Poland) Przemysław Wacha	22–20, 19–21, 22–20	(gold) Winner
2015	Prague Open	(India) B. Sumeeth Reddy	(Poland) Adam Cwalina (Poland) Przemysław Wacha	21–19, 20–22, 14–21	(silver) Runner-up
2015	Bulgarian International	(India) B. Sumeeth Reddy	(Germany) Raphael Beck (Germany) Peter Käsbauer	14–21, 16–21	(silver) Runner-up
2016	Peru International	(India) B. Sumeeth Reddy	(Poland) Adam Cwalina (Poland) Przemysław Wacha	19–21, 21–18, 28–30	(silver) Runner-up
2017	Lagos International	(India) B. Sumeeth Reddy	(Nigeria) Godwin Olofua (Nigeria) Anuoluwapo Juwon Opeyori	21–13, 21–15	(gold) Winner
2018	Lagos International	(India) B. Sumeeth Reddy	(India) Vaibhaav (India) Prakash Raj	21–12, 21–12	(gold) Winner
2019	Nepal International	(India) B. Sumeeth Reddy	(India) Arjun M. R. (India) Dhruv Kapila	21–19, 21–15	(gold) Winner
2019	India International	(India) B. Sumeeth Reddy	(Thailand) Chaloempon Charoenkitamorn (Thailand) Kittisak Namdash	21–15, 21–15	(gold) Winner

Mixed doubles
Year	Tournament	Partner	Opponent	Score	Result
2014	Tata Open India International	(India) N. Sikki Reddy	(India) Akshay Dewalkar (India) Pradnya Gadre	21–19, 19–21, 21–10	(gold) Winner
2018	Lagos International	(India) K. Maneesha	(India) Rohan Kapoor (India) Kuhoo Garg	21–17, 23–21	(gold) Winner

BWF International Challenge tournament
BWF International Series tournament
BWF Future Series tournament
