= Mexico City Grand Prix (badminton) =

Badminton tournament

The Mexico City Grand Prix or Mexico City Open is an open international badminton tournament held in Mexico City, Mexico. The tournament was a Grand Prix level, with the total prize money equaling US$50,000.

== Previous winners ==
Year	Men's singles	Women's singles	Men's doubles	Women's doubles	Mixed doubles
2015	(South Korea) Lee Dong-keun	(Japan) Sayaka Sato	(India) Manu Attri (India) B. Sumeeth Reddy	(Japan) Shizuka Matsuo (Japan) Mami Naito	(Malaysia) Chan Peng Soon (Malaysia) Goh Liu Ying
