= Goh Liu Ying =

Malaysian badminton player (born 1989)

Goh Liu Ying 吴柳萤
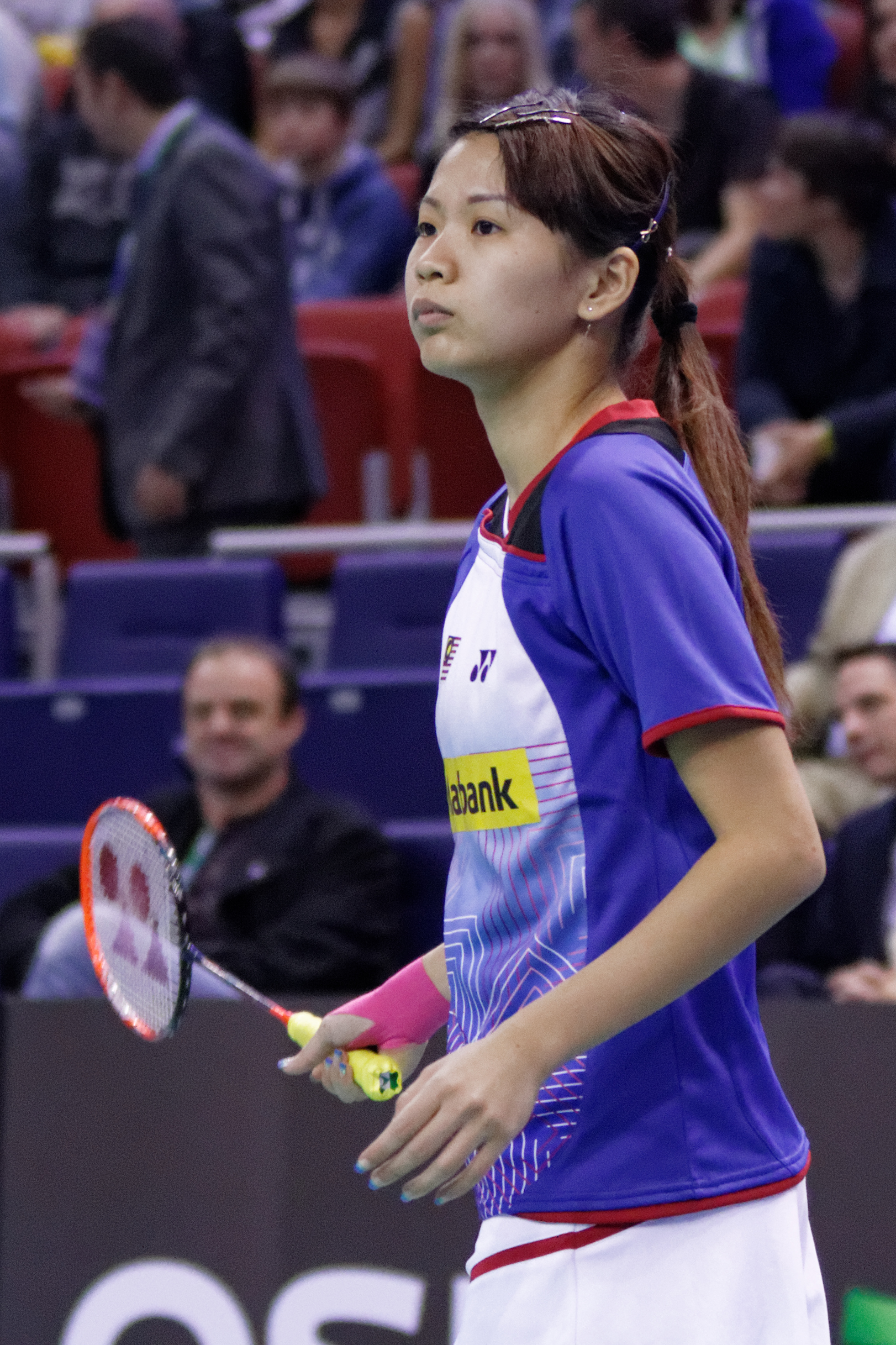
- Goh at the 2013 French Open

Personal information
- Born: 30 May 1989 (age 37) Alor Gajah, Malacca, Malaysia
- Height: 166 cm (5 ft 5 in)

Sport
- Country: Malaysia
- Sport: Badminton
- Handedness: Right
- Retired: 11 January 2023

Mixed doubles
- Highest ranking: 3 (with Chan Peng Soon, 22 November 2012)
- BWF profile
Medal record
Women's badminton
Representing Malaysia
Olympic Games
Silver medal – second place	2016 Rio de Janeiro	Mixed doubles
Sudirman Cup
Bronze medal – third place	2009 Guangzhou	Mixed team
Commonwealth Games
Gold medal – first place	2010 New Delhi	Mixed team
Silver medal – second place	2018 Gold Coast	Mixed team
Bronze medal – third place	2018 Gold Coast	Mixed doubles
Asian Championships
Gold medal – first place	2010 New Delhi	Mixed doubles
SEA Games
Gold medal – first place	2009 Vientiane	Women's team
Silver medal – second place	2015 Singapore	Mixed doubles
Silver medal – second place	2015 Singapore	Women's team
Bronze medal – third place	2007 Nakhon Ratchasima	Women's team
Bronze medal – third place	2009 Vientiane	Mixed doubles
World Junior Championships
Bronze medal – third place	2006 Incheon	Mixed team
Bronze medal – third place	2007 Waitakere City	Girls' doubles
Asian Junior Championships
Gold medal – first place	2007 Kuala Lumpur	Mixed team

Goh Liu Ying
- Traditional Chinese: 吳柳螢
- Simplified Chinese: 吴柳萤
Transcriptions
Standard Mandarin
- Hanyu Pinyin: Wú Liǔyíng

Goh Liu Ying KMN AMN BCM OLY (Chinese: 吴柳萤; pinyin: Wú Liǔyíng; born 30 May 1989) is a Malaysian former badminton player. She had been consistently ranked among the top 10 mixed doubles player in the world with her partner, Chan Peng Soon. Together, they were ranked as high as world No. 3. They won the silver medal at the 2016 Summer Olympics.

== Early life ==
Goh was born on 30 May 1989 in Alor Gajah, Malacca to Goh Chak Whee and Yong Oi Lin. She has two younger brothers, Goh Qi Hao and Goh Qi Liang. Both of them studied at SMK Munshi Abdullah in 5SN1. She first started training in badminton at the age of 10. She enrolled into the Bukit Jalil Sports School when she was 13 years old.

== Career ==
In 2009, Goh and Chan reached their first international tournament final at the Vietnam Open but were defeated by Flandy Limpele and Cheng Wen-hsing. At the 2009 SEA Games, she won gold in women's team event and bronze in mixed doubles event.

In 2010, they came to prominence when they won the Badminton Asia Championships after defeating South Korean's Yoo Yeon-seong and Kim Min-jung in the final. At the 2010 Commonwealth Games, she won the gold medal in mixed team event. In the mixed doubles event, Goh and Chan lost the bronze medal match to Chayut Triyachart and Yao Lei. At the 2010 Asian Games they lost in the first round to eventual winner, Shin Baek-cheol and Lee Hyo-jung.

In 2011, they were defeated by Indonesian pair, Tontowi Ahmad and Liliyana Natsir in the final of the Malaysia Open. They won the Bitburger Open by defeating Denmark's Thomas Laybourn and Kamilla Rytter Juhl.

In 2012, they became the first Malaysian mixed doubles pair to reach the semi-finals of the All England Open but lost to Tontowi Ahmad and Liliyana Natsir. In the following month, they became the runner-up of Australia Open after losing to Chinese Taipei's Chen Hung-Ling and Cheng Wen-Hsing in the final. They gained their first ever Malaysia Open crown by beating Indonesian pair, Irfan Fadhilah and Weni Anggraini.

Goh and Chan represented Malaysia at the 2012 Summer Olympics. They were the first ever Malaysian mixed doubles pair to qualify for the Olympic Games. They lost all three group matches and failed to progress to quarter-finals in their Olympics debut. In the same year, Goh and Chan won their first Super Series tournament at the Japan Open by beating Muhammad Rijal and Liliyana Natsir. In November 2012, they reached the final of China Open but were defeated by top seed, Xu Chen and Ma Jin in straight sets. They were ranked 3rd in the world at their career high at the end of 2012.

In 2014, Goh decided to undergo knee surgery to fix her aggravating right knee. While she was recovering, Goh enrolled into a modelling academy and did some modelling for the sports of badminton. After a total of 11-month hiatus due to recovery, Goh resumed her partnership with Chan in 2015.

They won three titles in 2015, the Polish Open, Russian Open and the Mexico Open. At the 2015 SEA Games, they won silver after losing to Indonesia's Praveen Jordan and Debby Susanto in a very tightly contested mixed doubles final. Goh also won silver in women's team event.

In 2016, they became the runner-up of the inaugural edition of Thailand Masters after losing to unseeded Chinese pair, Zheng Siwei and Chen Qingchen in the final. In March, they clinched their first title of the year by winning the New Zealand Open. In April, they were defeated by Indonesian pair, Tontowi Ahmad and Liliyana Natsir in the final of the Malaysia Open.

Goh and Chan qualified for the 2016 Summer Olympics. They won their first two group stage matches but lost the third to Indonesian pair, Tontowi Ahmad and Liliyana Natsir. They finished as group runner-up and progressed to the quarter-finals round. In the quarter-finals, they beat Group B winner, Robert Mateusiak and Nadieżda Zięba of Poland. In the semi-finals, they beat China's Xu Chen and Ma Jin in straight games to reach the final.

In the final, they had to settle for silver medal after they were beaten by Tontowi Ahmad and Liliyana Natsir for the second time in the tournament. Despite the fact that Goh and Chan lost in the final, they made history as the first Malaysian mixed doubles pair to claim an Olympic medal.

In March 2017, Goh and Chan become the first Malaysian mixed doubles pair to reach the All England Open final since 1955. In the final, Goh and Chan were defeated by 5th seed Lu Kai and Huang Yaqiong in 3 sets after a few controversial fault calls by the umpire against them. In April, Chan and Goh had to withdraw from the semi-final of India Open due to Goh's illness. They later suffered a first round loss to Edi Subaktiar and Gloria Emanuelle Widjaja in the Malaysia Open.

In May 2017, Goh announced that she had an aggravating injury in her right shoulder and thus, she went to Halle in Germany for surgery. She spent weeks to undergo her rehabilitation in Halle before returning to Malaysia in early July when she released her autobiography entitled I am Goh Liu Ying. In November 2017, Goh partnered with Chen Tang Jie to win the India International Series.

In January 2018, Goh resumed her partnership with Chan and they won the Thailand Masters. At the 2018 Commonwealth Games, she won the silver medal in mixed team event and the bronze medal in mixed doubles event.

In December 2018, she announced her resignation from Badminton Association of Malaysia with her current partner Chan Peng Soon. She also participated in Purple League 18/19 with Tang Chun Man in mixed doubles. Chan and Goh had grabbed their first title in 2019 Thailand Masters after their resignation from BAM.

In July 2021, Goh with her partner Chan competed at the 2020 Summer Olympics, but was eliminated in the group stage.

On 6 December 2021, Goh partner Chan announced in his Instagram post that Chan-Goh have decided to split up after 13 years of playing badminton together. BWF World Tour Finals 2021 was the last games Chan-Goh played. Ong Yew Sin later became Goh's new partner and the planned German Open will be their first tournament together.

== Retirement ==
In November 2022, Goh announced her plans to retire after competing at the 2023 Malaysia Open. Teaming up again with Chan Peng Soon, they lost 21–18, 15–21, 7–21 to the Indonesian pair of Rehan Naufal Kusharjanto and Lisa Ayu Kusumawati in the first round on 10 January 2023. Badminton Association of Malaysia organized a retirement ceremony for Goh at the Axiata Arena on 14 January 2023. An exhibition match featuring Goh, Tan Boon Heong, Koo Kean Keat, Chan Peng Soon, Cheah Liek Hou and Beiwen Zhang was held during the ceremony. Following her retirement, Goh founded a badminton academy; GLY Academy in Melaka and runs a sports agency; Wellsport as well as a gown rental shop - Tuilerie - in Kuala Lumpur. In July 2023, she opened a badminton hall - GLY Badminton Hall - in Krubong, Melaka with hopes to bring more resources in the sport to her birthplace.

== Personal life ==
On 18 April 2023, Goh hinted that she is married to a low-profile businessman, whom she started dating when she was still competing, through a series of postings on her Facebook and Instagram profiles. Goh gave birth a child on 31 August 2023.

== Achievements ==
=== Olympic Games ===
Mixed doubles
Year	Venue	Partner	Opponent	Score	Result
2016	Riocentro - Pavilion 4, Rio de Janeiro, Brazil	(Malaysia) Chan Peng Soon	(Indonesia) Tontowi Ahmad (Indonesia) Liliyana Natsir	14–21, 12–21	Silver

=== Commonwealth Games ===
Mixed doubles
Year	Venue	Partner	Opponent	Score	Result
2018	Carrara Sports and Leisure Centre; Gold Coast, Australia	(Malaysia) Chan Peng Soon	(India) Satwiksairaj Rankireddy (India) Ashwini Ponnappa	21–19, 21–19	Bronze

=== Asian Championships ===
Mixed doubles
Year	Venue	Partner	Opponent	Score	Result
2010	Siri Fort Indoor Stadium; New Delhi, India	(Malaysia) Chan Peng Soon	(South Korea) Yoo Yeon-seong (South Korea) Kim Min-jung	21–17, 20–22, 21–19	Gold

=== SEA Games ===
Mixed doubles
Year	Venue	Partner	Opponent	Score	Result
2009	Gym Hall 1, National Sports Complex; Vientiane, Laos	(Malaysia) Chan Peng Soon	(Thailand) Songphon Anugritayawon (Thailand) Kunchala Voravichitchaikul	18–21, 13–21	Bronze
2015	Singapore Indoor Stadium; Singapore	(Malaysia) Chan Peng Soon	(Indonesia) Praveen Jordan (Indonesia) Debby Susanto	21–18, 13–21, 23–25	Silver

=== BWF World Junior Championships ===
Girls' doubles
Year	Venue	Partner	Opponent	Score	Result
2007	The Trusts Stadium; Waitakere City, New Zealand	(Malaysia) Ng Hui Lin	(South Korea) Jung Kyung-Eun (South Korea) Yoo Hyun-young	11–21, 12–21	Bronze

=== BWF World Tour (4 titles, 2 runners-up) ===
The BWF World Tour, which was announced on 19 March 2017 and implemented in 2018, is a series of elite badminton tournaments sanctioned by the Badminton World Federation (BWF). The BWF World Tour is divided into levels of World Tour Finals, Super 1000, Super 750, Super 500, Super 300 (part of the HSBC World Tour), and the BWF Tour Super 100.

Mixed doubles
Year	Tournament	Level	Partner	Opponent	Score	Result
2018	Thailand Masters	Super 300	(Malaysia) Chan Peng Soon	(Thailand) Dechapol Puavaranukroh (Thailand) Puttita Supajirakul	21–15, 14–21, 21–16	(gold) Winner
2018	Australian Open	Super 300	(Malaysia) Chan Peng Soon	(South Korea) Seo Seung-jae (South Korea) Chae Yoo-jung	12–21, 21–23	(silver) Runner-up
2018	U.S. Open	Super 300	(Malaysia) Chan Peng Soon	(Germany) Marvin Seidel (Germany) Linda Efler	21–19, 21–15	(gold) Winner
2018	Indonesia Open	Super 1000	(Malaysia) Chan Peng Soon	(Indonesia) Tontowi Ahmad (Indonesia) Liliyana Natsir	17–21, 8–21	(silver) Runner-up
2019	Thailand Masters	Super 300	(Malaysia) Chan Peng Soon	(Thailand) Dechapol Puavaranukroh (Thailand) Sapsiree Taerattanachai	21–16, 21–15	(gold) Winner
2019	New Zealand Open	Super 300	(Malaysia) Chan Peng Soon	(Indonesia) Praveen Jordan (Indonesia) Melati Daeva Oktavianti	21–14, 16–21, 29–27	(gold) Winner

=== BWF Superseries (1 title, 4 runners-up) ===
The BWF Superseries, which was launched on 14 December 2006 and implemented in 2007, was a series of elite badminton tournaments, sanctioned by the Badminton World Federation (BWF). BWF Superseries levels were Superseries and Superseries Premier. A season of Superseries consisted of twelve tournaments around the world that had been introduced since 2011. Successful players were invited to the Superseries Finals, which were held at the end of each year.

Mixed doubles
Year	Tournament	Partner	Opponent	Score	Result
2012	Japan Open	(Malaysia) Chan Peng Soon	(Indonesia) Muhammad Rijal (Indonesia) Liliyana Natsir	21–12, 21–19	(gold) Winner
2012	China Open	(Malaysia) Chan Peng Soon	(China) Xu Chen (China) Ma Jin	15–21, 17–21	(silver) Runner-up
2013	Malaysia Open	(Malaysia) Chan Peng Soon	(Denmark) Joachim Fischer Nielsen (Denmark) Christinna Pedersen	13–21, 18–21	(silver) Runner-up
2016	Malaysia Open	(Malaysia) Chan Peng Soon	(Indonesia) Tontowi Ahmad (Indonesia) Liliyana Natsir	21–23, 21–13, 16–21	(silver) Runner-up
2017	All England Open	(Malaysia) Chan Peng Soon	(China) Lu Kai (China) Huang Yaqiong	21–18, 19–21, 16–21	(silver) Runner-up

BWF Super Series Finals tournament
BWF Super Series Premier tournament
BWF Super Series tournament

=== BWF Grand Prix (5 titles, 4 runners-up) ===
The BWF Grand Prix had two levels, the Grand Prix and Grand Prix Gold. It was a series of badminton tournaments sanctioned by the Badminton World Federation (BWF) and played between 2007 and 2017.

Mixed doubles
Year	Tournament	Partner	Opponent	Score	Result
2009	Vietnam Open	(Malaysia) Chan Peng Soon	(Indonesia) Flandy Limpele (Chinese Taipei) Cheng Wen-hsing	23–25, 19–21	(silver) Runner-up
2011	Malaysia Grand Prix Gold	(Malaysia) Chan Peng Soon	(Indonesia) Tontowi Ahmad (Indonesia) Liliyana Natsir	21–18, 15–21, 19–21	(silver) Runner-up
2011	Bitburger Open	(Malaysia) Chan Peng Soon	(Denmark) Thomas Laybourn (Denmark) Kamilla Rytter Juhl	21–18, 14–21, 27–25	(gold) Winner
2012	Australian Open	(Malaysia) Chan Peng Soon	(Chinese Taipei) Chen Hung-ling (Chinese Taipei) Cheng Wen-hsing	20–22, 21–12, 21–23	(silver) Runner-up
2012	Malaysia Grand Prix Gold	(Malaysia) Chan Peng Soon	(Indonesia) Irfan Fadhilah (Indonesia) Weni Anggraini	21–12, 21–14	(gold) Winner
2015	Russian Open	(Malaysia) Chan Peng Soon	(Japan) Yuta Watanabe (Japan) Arisa Higashino	21–14, 21–12	(gold) Winner
2015	Mexico City Grand Prix	(Malaysia) Chan Peng Soon	(South Korea) Choi Sol-gyu (South Korea) Eom Hye-won	21–13, 23–21	(gold) Winner
2016	Thailand Masters	(Malaysia) Chan Peng Soon	(China) Zheng Siwei (China) Chen Qingchen	17–21, 15–21	(silver) Runner-up
2016	New Zealand Open	(Malaysia) Chan Peng Soon	(China) Zheng Siwei (China) Li Yinhui	21–19, 22–20	(gold) Winner

BWF Grand Prix Gold tournament
BWF Grand Prix tournament

=== BWF International Challenge/Series (2 titles, 1 runner-up) ===
Mixed doubles
Year	Tournament	Partner	Opponent	Score	Result
2015	Polish Open	(Malaysia) Chan Peng Soon	(India) Akshay Dewalkar (India) Pradnya Gadre	28–26, 21–18	(gold) Winner
2015	Orleans International	(Malaysia) Chan Peng Soon	(Denmark) Mathias Christiansen (Denmark) Lena Grebak	21–11, 17–21, 19–21	(silver) Runner-up
2017	India International Series	(Malaysia) Chen Tang Jie	(India) Rohan Kapoor (India) Kuhoo Garg	21–19, 21–13	(gold) Winner

BWF International Challenge tournament
BWF Future Series tournament

== Awards and accolades ==
Year	Award	Category	Result	Ref(s)
2023	The Malaysia Book of Records	First medalist in Olympic Games Badminton (Female)	Won	

== Honours ==
=== Honours of Malaysia ===
- Malaysia
  - Officer of the Order of the Defender of the Realm (KMN) (2026)
  - Member of the Order of the Defender of the Realm (AMN) (2017)
- Malacca
  - Distinguished Service Star (BCM) (2016)

Olympic Games
Preceded by Lee Chong Wei	Flagbearer for Malaysia (with Lee Zii Jia); Tokyo 2020	Succeeded by Bertrand Rhodict Lises; Nur Shazrin Mohd Latif
