= Arturo Hernández (badminton) =

Mexican badminton player (born 1991)

Personal information
- Born: 12 March 1991 (age 35)

Sport
- Country: Mexico
- Sport: Badminton

Men's singles & doubles
- Highest ranking: 185 (MS 31 March 2016); 114 (MD 18 June 2015); 175 (XD 29 September 2016)
- BWF profile
Medal record
Men's badminton
Representing Mexico
Central American & Caribbean Games
Silver medal – second place	2014 Veracruz	Mixed team

Arturo Hernández (born 12 March 1991) is a Mexican badminton player. He competed at the 2014 Central American and Caribbean Games, winning a silver medal in the mixed team event.

== Achievements ==
=== BWF International Challenge/Series ===
Men's singles
Year	Tournament	Opponent	Score	Result
2018	Peru Future Series	(Mexico) Luis Ramón Garrido	9–21, 8–21	(silver) Runner-up

Men's doubles
Year	Tournament	Partner	Opponent	Score	Result
2014	Internacional Mexicano	(Mexico) Lino Muñoz	(Mexico) Job Castillo (Mexico) Antonio Ocegueda	14–21, 15–21	(silver) Runner-up
2016	Internacional Mexicano	(Mexico) Mauricio Casillas	(Mexico) Jesús Barajas (Mexico) Luis Montoya	18–21, 21–17, 20–22	(silver) Runner-up

Mixed doubles
Year	Tournament	Partner	Opponent	Score	Result
2016	Internacional Mexicano	(Mexico) Mariana Ugalde	(Austria) Vilson Vattanirappel (Mexico) Cynthia González	21–15, 11–21, 14–21	(silver) Runner-up

BWF International Challenge tournament
BWF International Series tournament
BWF Future Series tournament
