= Gungal, Ranga Reddy district =

Gungal
- Village
- Location in Telangana, India Gungal (India)
- Coordinates: 17°07′N 78°41′E
- Country: India
- State: Telangana

Languages
  - Official: Telugu
- Time zone: UTC+5:30 (IST)
- PIN: 501506
- Vehicle registration: TS-29 X XXXX
- Website: telangana.gov.in

Gungal is a village in Ranga Reddy district in Telangana, India. It falls under Yacharam mandal.
