= BWF Grand Prix Gold and Grand Prix =

Badminton championships

The BWF Grand Prix Gold and Grand Prix was a series of badminton tournaments sanctioned by Badminton World Federation (BWF) which was run from 2007 to 2017.

== Features ==
=== Prize money ===
A Grand Prix Gold tournament offered minimum prize money of US$120,000, while a Grand Prix tournament offered minimum prize money of US$50,000. The formula of prize money distribution was identical to Super Series tournament.

=== World Ranking points ===
The BWF Grand Prix Gold and Grand Prix series offered third only to BWF tournaments (after BWF events and Super Series), according to World Ranking system.

== Tournaments ==
Tournament	Season										
Tournament	2007	2008	2009	2010	2011	2012	2013	2014	2015	2016	2017
Australian Open			●	●	●	●	●				
Bitburger Open	●	●	●	●	●	●	●	●	●	●	●
Brasil Open								●	●	●	
Bulgaria Open		●									
Canada Open				●	●	●	●	●	●	●	●
China Masters								●	●	●	●
Chinese Taipei Masters									●	●	
Chinese Taipei Open	●	●	●	●	●	●	●	●	●	●	●
Dutch Open	●	●	●	●	●	●	●	●	●	●	●
German Open	●	●	●	●	●	●	●	●	●	●	●
India Open		●	●	●							
Indonesian Masters				●	●	●	●	●	●	●	
Korea Masters				●	●	●	●	●	●	●	●
London Grand Prix Gold							●				
Macau Open	●	●	●	●	●	●	●	●	●	●	●
Malaysia Masters			●	●	●	●	●	●	●	●	●
Mexico City Grand Prix									●		
New Zealand Open	●	●	●				●	●	●	●	●
Philippines Open	●		●								
Russian Open	●	●	●	●	●	●	●	●	●	●	●
Scottish Open							●	●	●	●	●
Swiss Open					●	●	●	●	●	●	●
Syed Modi International			●	●	●	●		●	●	●	●
Thailand Masters										●	●
Thailand Open	●	●	●		●	●	●		●	●	●
U.S. Grand Prix								●	●		
U.S. Open	●	●	●	●	●	●	●	●	●	●	●
Vietnam Open	●	●	●	●	●	●	●	●	●	●	●

● Grand Prix
● Grand Prix Gold
