= Czech National Badminton Championships =

Badminton tournament in the Czech Republic

The Czech National Badminton Championships (Czech: Mistrovství České republiky v badmintonu) is a tournament organized to crown the best badminton players in the Czech Republic.

The tournament started in 1993 and is held every year.

== Past winners ==
Year	Men's singles	Women's singles	Men's doubles	Women's doubles	Mixed doubles
1993	Tomasz Mendrek	Eva Lacinová	Petr Janda; Daniel Gaspar	Eva Lacinová; Jitka Lacinová	Daniel Gaspar; Jitka Lacinová
1994	Tomasz Mendrek	Jitka Lacinová	Tomasz Mendrek; Richard Hobzik	Eva Lacinová; Jitka Lacinová	Daniel Gaspar; Jitka Lacinová
1995	Tomasz Mendrek	Markéta Koudelková	Tomasz Mendrek; Ondřej Lubas	Eva Lacinová; Jitka Lacinová	Michal Koudelka; Markéta Koudelková
1996	Tomasz Mendrek	Markéta Koudelková	Petr Janda; Daniel Gaspar	Jarka Nováková; Jitka Lacinová	Daniel Gaspar; Jitka Lacinová
1997	Tomasz Mendrek	Markéta Koudelková	Tomasz Mendrek; Petr Báša	Markéta Koudelková; Ludmila Bášová	Jan Jurka; Dana Kykalová
1998	Jan Fröhlich	Markéta Koudelková	Zdeněk Musil; Petr Báša	Markéta Koudelková; Ludmila Bášová	Daniel Gaspar; Jana Daňhelková
1999	Jan Fröhlich	Markéta Koudelková	Zdeněk Musil; Petr Báša	Markéta Koudelková; Ludmila Bášová	Michal Koudelka; Markéta Koudelková
2000	Jan Fröhlich	Markéta Koudelková	Jan Fröhlich; Petr Martinec	Markéta Koudelková; Ludmila Bášová	Pavel Kubiš; Eva Melounová
2001	Jan Fröhlich	Markéta Koudelková	Jan Fröhlich; Petr Martinec	Eva Brožová; Hana Milisová	Martin Herout; Eva Brožová
2002	Jan Fröhlich	Martina Benešová	René Neděla; Jiří Skočdopole	Ivana Vilimková; Hana Procházková	Martin Herout; Eva Brožová
2003	Jan Fröhlich	Markéta Koudelková	Jiří Provaznik; Adam Hobzik	Eva Brožová; Hana Milisová	Petr Koukal; Markéta Koudelková
2004	Jan Fröhlich	Markéta Koudelková	Filip Stádník; Michal Svoboda	Markéta Koudelková; Kristína Ludíková	Jiří Skočdopole; Hana Procházková
2005	Jan Fröhlich	Hana Procházková	Jan Fröhlich; Jan Vondra	Eva Brožová; Hana Milisová	Martin Herout; Eva Brožová
2006	Jan Fröhlich	Eva Brožová	Stanislav Kohoutek; Pavel Florián	Eva Brožová; Hanka Milisová	Martin Herout; Eva Brožová
2007	Petr Koukal	Eva Titěrová	Stanislav Kohoutek; Pavel Florián	Eva Titěrová; Hana Milisová	Martin Herout; Eva Titěrová
2008	Petr Koukal	Kristína Ludíková	Stanislav Kohoutek; Pavel Florián	Hana Procházková; Kristína Ludíková	Pavel Florián; Martina Benešová
2009	Petr Koukal	Martina Benešová	Jakub Bitman; Pavel Drančák	Eva Titěrová; Hana Milisová	Pavel Florián; Martina Benešová
2010	Petr Koukal	Kristína Ludíková	Jakub Bitman; Pavel Drančák	Hana Kollarová; Martina Benešová	Jakub Bitman; Alžběta Bášová
2011	Petr Koukal	Kristína Ludíková	Jakub Bitman; Pavel Drančák	Kristína Ludíková; Markéta Mouritsen	Jakub Bitman; Alžběta Bášová
2012	Jan Fröhlich	Kristína Gavnholt	Josef Rubáš; Jaroslav Sobota	Šárka Křížková; Kateřina Tomalová	Jakub Bitman; Alžběta Bášová
2013	Petr Koukal	Kristína Gavnholt	Josef Rubáš; Jaroslav Sobota	Hana Milisová; Lucie Černá	Jakub Bitman; Alžběta Bášová
2014	Petr Koukal	Kristína Gavnholt	Pavel Florián; Ondřej Kopřiva	Lucie Černá; Hana Milisová	Jakub Bitman; Alžběta Bášová
2015	Petr Koukal	Kristína Gavnholt	Stanislav Kohoutek; Michal Světnička	Lucie Černá; Hana Milisová	Jakub Bitman; Alžběta Bášová
2016	Petr Koukal	Kristína Gavnholt	Pavel Drančák; Jakub Bitman	Michaela Fuchsová; Alžběta Bášová	Jakub Bitman; Alžběta Bášová
2017	Milan Ludík	Tereza Švábíková	Jaromír Janáček; Petr Beran	Michaela Fuchsová; Alžběta Bášová	Jakub Bitman; Alžběta Bášová
2018	Jan Louda	Tereza Švábíková	Pavel Drančák; Jakub Bitman	Michaela Fuchsová; Alžběta Bášová	Jakub Bitman; Alžběta Bášová
2019	Adam Mendrek	Tereza Švábíková	Jaromír Janáček; Tomáš Švejda	Michaela Fuchsová; Alžběta Bášová	Jakub Bitman; Alžběta Bášová
2020	Jan Louda	Tereza Švábíková	Jaromír Janáček; Tomáš Švejda	Michaela Fuchsová; Alžběta Bášová	Jakub Bitman; Alžběta Bášová
2021	Jan Louda	Tereza Švábíková	Ondřej Král; Adam Mendrek	Lucie Krpatová; Kateřina Zuzáková	Jan Hubáček; Michaela Fuchsová
2022	Jan Louda	Tereza Švábíková	Ondřej Král; Adam Mendrek	Lucie Krpatová; Kateřina Zuzáková	Vít Kulíšek; Denisa Šikalová
2023	Jiří Král	Tereza Švábíková	Ondřej Král; Adam Mendrek	Lucie Krulová; Petra Maixnerová	Vojtěch Šelong; Tereza Švábíková
2024	Jiří Král	Sharleen van Coppenolle	Tadeáš Brázda; Jan Janoštík	Lucie Krpatová; Kateřina Valentová	Jiří Král; Lucie Krpatová
2025	Jan Louda	Petra Maixnerová	Tadeáš Brázda; Jan Janoštík	Soňa Hořínková; Kateřina Zuzáková	Adam Šulc; Klára Šilhavá
