= 2014 Thomas Cup qualification =

- Date: 6 March 2014
- Nations: 24

The 2014 Thomas Cup qualification process took place on 6 March 2014 to decide the final 16 teams that will compete in the 2014 Thomas Cup.

== Qualified teams ==
Country	Confederation	Qualified as	Qualified on	World Men's Team Rankings	Final appearance
India	Badminton Asia	Host country	April 2013	9th	10th
China	Badminton Asia	2012 Thomas Cup winner	27 May 2012	2nd	17th
Indonesia	Badminton Asia	Best ranking in Asia	6 March 2014	1st	25th
Malaysia	Badminton Asia	Third best ranking in Asia	6 March 2014	3rd	25th
Japan	Badminton Asia	Fourth best ranking in Asia	6 March 2014	4th	13th
South Korea	Badminton Asia	Fifth best ranking in Asia	6 March 2014	6th	16th
Thailand	Badminton Africa	Sixth best ranking in Asia	6 March 2014	7th	11th
Chinese Taipei	Badminton Asia	Seventh best ranking in Asia	6 March 2014	8th	3rd
Hong Kong	Badminton Asia	Ninth best ranking in Asia	6 March 2014	10th	3rd
Singapore	Badminton Asia	Tenth best ranking in Asia	6 March 2014	15th	2nd
Denmark	Badminton Europe	Best ranking in Europe	6 March 2014	5th	28th
Germany	Badminton Europe	Second best ranking in Europe	6 March 2014	11th	6th
England	Badminton Europe	Third best ranking in Europe	6 March 2014	12th	14th
Russia	Badminton Europe	Fourth best ranking in Europe	6 March 2014	13th	2nd
France	Badminton Europe	Fifth best ranking in Europe	6 March 2014	14th	Debut
Nigeria	Badminton Africa	Best ranking in Africa	6 March 2014	16th	3rd

== Qualification process ==
=== World team rankings ===
In June 2012, the Badminton World Federation announced that the continental qualifiers would be temporarily scrapped. Therefore, the qualification of every national team for the 2014 Thomas Cup was determined based on their national ranking. The Netherlands, Poland and Sweden withdrew from the qualification process.

BWF World Men's Team Rankings as of 6 March 2014
#		Country	Conf.	First men's singles			Second men's singles			Third men's singles			First men's doubles			Second men's doubles			Points	Seeding
#		Country	Conf.	Player	Rank	Point	Player	Rank	Point	Player	Rank	Point	Player	Rank	Point	Player	Rank	Point	Points	Seeding
1	Steady	Indonesia	BA	Tommy Sugiarto	3	68,958	Sony Dwi Kuncoro	14	44,780	Dionysius Hayom Rumbaka	19	40,809	Mohammad Ahsan / Hendra Setiawan	1	86,140	Angga Pratama / Rian Agung Saputro	9	54,109	294,796	1
2	Steady	China	BA	Chen Long	2	75,255	Du Pengyu	7	58,500	Wang Zhengming	9	56,850	Liu Xiaolong / Qiu Zihan	6	64,940	Chai Biao / Hong Wei	21	38,890	294,435	2
3	Steady	Malaysia	BA	Lee Chong Wei	1	98,873	Chong Wei Feng	16	43,380	Liew Daren	37	33,060	Hoon Thien How / Tan Wee Kiong	7	56,590	Koo Kien Keat / Tan Boon Heong	8	55,700	287,603	3/4
4	Steady	Japan	BA	Kenichi Tago	5	65,945	Kento Momota	15	44,030	Takuma Ueda	17	42,835	Hiroyuki Endo / Kenichi Hayakawa	2	72,205	Takeshi Kamura / Keigo Sonoda	14	49,820	274,835	3/4
5	Steady	Denmark	BE	Jan Ø. Jørgensen	4	67,148	Hans-Kristian Vittinghus	21	40,486	Viktor Axelsen	26	38,195	Mathias Boe / Carsten Mogensen	4	71,192	Mads Conrad-Petersen / Mads Pieler Kolding	22	38,765	255,786	5/8
6	Steady	South Korea	BA	Son Wan-ho	6	60,047	Lee Dong-keun	21	49,341	Hwang Jong-soo	39	38,930	Ko Sung-hyun / Lee Yong-dae	5	68,670	Kim Gi-jung / Kim Sa-rang	6	66,690	283,678	5/8
7	Steady	Thailand	BA	Boonsak Ponsana	8	55,979	Tanongsak Saensomboonsuk	15	52,477	Suppanyu Avihingsanon	40	38,720	Maneepong Jongjit / Nipitphon Phuangphuapet	10	54,170	Wannawat Ampunsuwan / Patiphat Chalardchaleam	15	48,880	250,226	5/8
8	Steady	Chinese Taipei	BA	Chou Tien-chen	24	48,120	Hsu Jen-hao	29	46,216	Wang Tzu-wei	69	25,720	Lee Sheng-mu / Tsai Chia-hsin	12	52,460	Liang Jui-wei / Liao Kuan-hao	20	42,850	215,366	5/8
9	Steady	India	BA	Parupalli Kashyap	19	50,390	Srikanth Kidambi	20	49,790	Ajay Jayaram	32	43,520	Pranav Chopra / Akshay Dewalkar	37	31,650	Manu Attri / B. Sumeeth Reddy	43	30,080	205,530	9/12
10	Steady	Hong Kong	BA	Hu Yun	13	53,546	Wong Wing Ki	16	51,834	Wei Nan	28	45,330	Chan Tsz Kit / Lo Lok Kei	52	24,590	Lee Chun Hei / Ng Ka Long	66	21,440	196,740	9/12
11	Steady	Germany	BE	Marc Zwiebler	10	48,288	Dieter Domke	64	24,419	Lukas Schmidt	85	19,030	Michael Fuchs / Johannes Schöttler	32	31,223	Peter Käsbauer / Josche Zurwonne	35	29,667	152,627	9/16
12	Steady	England	BE	Rajiv Ouseph	22	39,594	Toby Penty	122	13,808	Sam Parsons	207	7,627	Chris Adcock / Andrew Ellis	11	51,726	Peter Mills / Chris Langridge	24	37,481	150,236	9/16
13	Steady	Russia	BE	Vladimir Ivanov	45	29,810	Vladimir Malkov	54	27,075	Anton Ivanov	130	12,420	Vladimir Ivanov / Ivan Sozonov	17	43,363	Nikita Khakimov / Vasily Kuznetsov	50	24,194	136,862	9/16
14	Steady	France	BE	Brice Leverdez	38	32,808	Lucas Corvée	70	21,603	Thomas Rouxel	71	20,536	Baptiste Carême / Ronan Labar	39	28,712	Lucas Corvée / Brice Leverdez	52	23,660	127,319	9/16
15	Steady	Singapore	BA	Derek Wong	46	29,396	Ashton Chen	74	20,080	Robin Gonansa	126	13,330	Terry Hee / Terry Yeo	86	13,320	Ashton Chen / Robin Gonansa	126	7,100	83,226	9/16
16	Steady	Nigeria	BCA	Jinkan Ifraimu	183	8,892	Enejoh Abah	184	8,760	Victor Makanju	266	5,110	Enejoh Abah / Victor Makanju	123	10,010	Ola Fagbemi / Jinkan Ifraimu	176	6,542	39,314	9/16
Reserve
17	Steady	United States	BPA	Sattawat Pongnairat	57	26,190	Howard Shu	73	20,119	Bjorn Seguin	93	17,500	Phillip Chew / Sattawat Pongnairat	56	23,357	Mathew Fogarty / Bjorn Seguin	135	9,400	96,566	R2
18	Steady	Vietnam	BA	Nguyễn Tiến Minh	8	57,237	Phạm Cao Cường	255	5,639	Nguyễn Hoàng Nam	302	4,220	Dương Bảo Đức / Nguyễn Hoàng Nam	105	11,354	Đỗ Tuấn Đức / Phạm Hồng Nam	331	3,050	81,500	R5
19	Steady	Ukraine	BE	Dmytro Zavadskyi	47	29,283	Valeriy Atrashchenkov	113	14,801	Kyrylo Leonov	179	9,650	Valeriy Atrashchenkov / Gennadiy Natarov	107	10,875	Sergiy Garist / Kyrylo Leonov	147	8,140	72,749	R6
20	Steady	Czech Republic	BE	Petr Koukal	78	19,770	Jan Fröhlich	88	18,552	Pavel Florián	175	9,836	Jan Fröhlich / Zdeněk Sváta	99	11,950	Pavel Florián / Ondřej Kopřiva	109	10,778	70,886	R7
21	Steady	Australia	BO	Nathan Tang	234	6,200	Luke Chong	251	5,720	Ashwant Gobinathan	256	5,618	Raymond Tam / Glenn Warfe	44	26,115	Robin Middleton / Ross Smith	48	24,780	68,433	R8
22	Steady	Finland	BE	Ville Lång	39	32,799	Eetu Heino	75	20,036	Kasper Lehikoinen	166	10,000	Henri Aarnio / Joonas Korhonen	314	3,300	Mika Koskenneva / Jesper von Hertzen	540	1,720	67,855	R9
23	Steady	Canada	BPA	Sergiy Shatenko	185	8,750	Andrew D'Souza	237	6,160	Timothy Chiu	276	4,990	Adrian Liu / Derrick Ng	51	23,711	Kevin Li / Nyl Yakura	71	16,832	60,443	R10
24	Steady	New Zealand	BO	Joe Wu	96	17,174	Michael Fowke	136	11,951	Maika Phillips	315	3,920	Kevin Dennerly-Minturn / Oliver Leydon-Davis	57	22,508	Brock Matheson / Asher Richardson	384	2,540	58,093	R11
Decline
25	Steady	Netherlands	BE	Eric Pang	31	35,961	Erik Meijs	116	14,501	Nick Fransman	129	12,632	Ruud Bosch / Koen Ridder	27	34,153	Jacco Arends / Jelle Maas	38	29,061	126,308	Declined participation
26	Steady	Poland	BE	Michał Rogalski	102	16,240	Adrian Dziółko	208	7,620	Mateusz Dubowski	382	3,040	Adam Cwalina / Przemysław Wacha	20	38,900	Łukasz Moreń / Wojciech Szkudlarczyk	26	34,700	100,500	Declined participation
27	Steady	Sweden	BE	Henri Hurskainen	42	31,380	Mattias Borg	90	17,957	Gabriel Ulldahl	101	16,748	Mattias Borg / Magnus Sahlberg	104	11,490	Patrick Lundqvist / Jonatan Nordh	138	8,792	86,367	Declined participation
