= Czechoslovak National Badminton Championships =

The Czechoslovak National Badminton Championships was a tournament organized to crown the best badminton players in Czechoslovakia. They were held between 1961 and 1992, and were succeeded by the Czech and the Slovak National Badminton Championships.

== Past winners ==
Year	Men's singles	Women's singles	Men's doubles	Women's doubles	Mixed doubles
1961	Petr Lacina	Alena Řezníčková	Petr Lacina; Jaroslav Houska	Naďa Benešová; Jiřina Krappelová	Petr Lacina; Naďa Benešová
1962	Petr Lacina	Naďa Benešová	Petr Lacina; Alois Patěk	Naďa Benešová; Ivana Houfová	Petr Lacina; Naďa Benešová
1963	Alois Patek	Jiřina Krappelová	Milan Kabatnik; Jiří Lacina	Naďa Benešová; Ivana Houfová	Petr Lacina; Naďa Benešová
1964	Vladimir Zrno	Naďa Benešová	No competition		
1965	Vladimir Zrno	Irena Červenková	Ivan Bareš; Alois Patěk	Irena Červenková; Jiřina Krappelová	Vladimir Zrno; Alena Mládková
1966	Vladimir Zrno	Irena Červenková	Ivan Bareš; Alois Patěk	Irena Červenková; Vera Peřinová	Jiří Král; Naďa Benešová
1967	Petr Lacina	Vera Peřinová	Ivan Bareš; Alois Patěk	Irena Červenková; Vera Peřinová	Alois Patěk; Vera Peřinová
1968	Jiří Král	Vera Peřinová	Petr Lacina; Jiří Král	Jitka Čejková; Vera Peřinová	Alois Patěk; Vera Peřinová
1969	Petr Lacina	Vera Peřinová	Ivan Bareš; Alois Patěk	Irena Pátková; Vera Peřinová	Alois Patěk; Vera Peřinová
1970	Ladislav Šrámek	Irena Pátková	Ivan Bareš; Alois Patěk	Irena Pátková; Danuše Povolná	Ivan Bareš; Jitka Čejková
1971	Petr Lacina	Irena Pátková	Petr Lacina; Ladislav Šrámek	Alena Poboráková; Danuše Povolná	Ladislav Šrámek; Alena Poboráková
1972	Miroslav Kokojan	Irena Pátková	Ivan Bareš; Alois Patek	Irena Pátková; Jaroslava Krahulcová	Alois Patěk; Jaroslava Krahulcová
1973	Petr Lacina	Alena Poboráková	Petr Lacina; Ladislav Šrámek	Irena Pátková; Jaroslava Krahulcová	Zbyněk Schwarz; Irena Pátková
1974	Petr Lacina	Alena Poboráková	Petr Lacina; Ladislav Šrámek	Alena Poboráková; Jaroslava Krahulcová	Konstantin Holobradý; Alena Poboráková
1975	Miroslav Kokojan	Alena Poboráková	Jaroslav Kozak; Lubomir Tetur	Alena Poboráková; Jaroslava Semecká	Ladislav Šrámek; Jaroslava Semecká
1976	Petr Lacina	Jiřína Hubertová	Miroslav Kokojan; Karel Lakomý	Alena Poboráková; Tatjana Pravdová	Petr Lacina; Tatjana Pravdová
1977	Miroslav Kokojan	Tatjana Pravdová	Petr Lacina; Konstantin Holobradý	Zuzana Válečková; Milena Hamralová	Michal Malý; Zuzana Válečková
1978	Ladislav Šrámek	Tatjana Pravdová	Ladislav Šrámek; Miroslav Šrámek	Alena Nejedlová; Milena Hamralová	Ladislav Šrámek; Jiřína Hubertová
1979	Juraj Lenart	Jiřína Hubertová	Ladislav Šrámek; Miroslav Šrámek	Alena Nejedlová; Dagmar Benická	Ladislav Šrámek; Jiřína Hubertová
1980	Michal Malý	Jiřína Hubertová	Michal Malý; Karel Lakomý	Alena Poboráková; Tatjana Šrámková	Michal Malý; Alena Nejedlová
1981	Michal Malý	Alena Nejedlová	Michal Malý; Karel Lakomý	Alena Nejedlová; Zuzana Urbánková	Miroslav Šrámek; Tatjana Šrámková
1982	Michal Malý	Alena Nejedlová	Michal Malý; Karel Lakomý	Alena Nejedlová; Zuzana Urbánková	Karel Lakomý; Zuzana Urbánková
1983	Michal Malý	Zuzana Urbánková	Michal Malý; Karel Lakomý	Jaroslava Balcarová; Zuzana Urbánková	Miroslav Šrámek; Tatjana Šrámková
1984	Michal Malý	Jaroslava Balcarová	Miroslav Šrámek; Richard Hobzik	Jaroslava Balcarová; Tatjana Šrámková	Michal Malý; Dana Malá
1985	Michal Malý	Jitka Lacinová	Michal Malý; Karel Lakomý	Jaroslava Balcarová; Tatjana Šrámková	Michal Malý; Dana Malá
1986	Miroslav Šrámek	Jaroslava Balcarová	Miroslav Šrámek; Tomasz Mendrek	Jitka Lacinová; Jaroslava Balcarová	Miroslav Šrámek; Jaroslava Balcarová
1987	Michal Malý	Jaroslava Balcarová	Michal Malý; Petr Koukal	Jitka Lacinová; Eva Lacinová	Michal Malý; Dana Malá
1988	Michal Malý	Jitka Lacinová	Tomasz Mendrek; Jiří Dufek	Jitka Lacinová; Eva Lacinová	Tomasz Mendrek; Jitka Lacinová
1989	Michal Malý	Adela Šimurková	Tomasz Mendrek; Jiří Dufek	Adela Šimurková; Eva Lacinová	Zdeněk Musil; Adela Šimurková
1990	Tomasz Mendrek	Adela Šimurková	Tomasz Mendrek; Jiří Dufek	Jitka Lacinová; Eva Lacinová	Radek Svoboda; Jana Smetanová
1991	Tomasz Mendrek	Jitka Lacinová	Tomasz Mendrek; Jiří Dufek	Jitka Lacinová; Petra Hlubučková	Zdeněk Musil; Jitka Lacinová
1992	Tomasz Mendrek	Eva Lacinová	Jan Jurka; Radek Gregor	Ludmila Bášová; Alena Horáková	Daniel Gaspar; Adela Zimmerová

== Team champions ==
Saison	1.	2.	3.
1964	Spoje Praha		
1965	Meteor Praha		
1966	Meteor Praha		
1967	Meteor Praha		
1968	Spoje Praha		
1969	Spoje Praha		
1970	Meteor Praha		
1971	Meteor Praha		
1972	Meteor Praha		
1973	Spoje Praha		
1974	Spoje Praha		
1975	Spoje Praha		
1976	Spoje Praha		
1977	Spoje Praha		
1978	Spoje Praha		
1979	Spoje Praha		
1980	Spoje Praha		
1981	Spoje Praha		
1982	Spoje Praha		
1983	Spoje Praha		
1984	Spoje Praha		
1985	Spoje Praha		
1986	Spoje Praha		
1987	Spoje Praha		
1988	Spoje Praha		
1989	Spoje Praha		
1990	Meteor Praha		
1991	Spoje Praha		
1992	Meteor Praha		

== Junior champions ==
Year	Men's singles	Women's singles	Men's doubles	Women's doubles	Mixed doubles
1965	Miroslav Pezlar	Vera Perinová	Miroslav Pezlar / Ladislav Rehor	Vera Perinová / Miluse Bilciková	Petr Nadvorník / Vera Perinová
1966	Jan Novotný	Hana Rerichová	Miroslav Pezlar / Ladislav Rehor	Dana Povolná / Milena Kuzelová	Jan Novotný / Hana Rerichová
1967	Ladislav Rehor	Milena Kuzelová	Jan Chmela / Jiří Chmela	Milena Kuzelová / Alexandra Fadrna	Zbynek Schwarz / Jaroslava Krahulcová
1968	Petr Pavel	Jaroslava Krahulcová	Josef Brejcha / Petr Freimann	Jaroslava Krahulcová / Anna Skodová	Petr Freimann / Benediktová
1969	Petr Pavel	Jaroslava Krahulcová	Tomas Dohnal / Petr Pavel	Marie Krkošková / Vera Mydlarová	Petr Pavel / Jaroslava Krahulcová
1970	Petr Pavel	Marie Krkošková	Zdenek Kozesnik / Josef Kraus	Jaroslava Krahulcová / Anna Skodová	Petr Pavel / Jaroslava Krahulcová
1971	Miroslav Šrámek	Marie Krkošková	Zdenek Kozesnik / Mojmir Skalický	Marie Krkošková / Olga Zrnová	Mojmir Skalicky / Marie Krkošková
1972	Miroslav Šrámek	Marie Krkošková	Miroslav Šrámek / Ales Guttenberger	Tatjana Pravdová / Olga Zrnová	Miroslav Šrámek / Olga Zrnová
1973	Karel Myskovsky	Marie Krkošková	J. Reis / J. Vachna	Marie Krkošková / Jitka Trminková	Karel Myskovsky / Marie Krkošková
1974	Karel Lakomý	Maria Holobradá	Karel Lakomý / Vladimir Janda	Maria Holobradá / Helena Turcinková	Vladimir Janda / Helena Turcinková
1975	Karel Lakomý	Helena Turcinková	Karel Lakomý / Vladimir Janda	Helena Turcinková / Buresová	Karel Lakomý / Zuzana Valečková
1976	Michal Malý	Jirina Hubertová	Vladimir Janda / Lubos Sedlak	Helena Turcinková / Jirina Hubertová	Michal Malý / Zuzana Valečková
1977	Michal Malý	Zuzana Valečková	Michal Malý / Ladislav Tandler	Milena Hamralová / Zuzana Valečková	Michal Malý / Zuzana Valečková
1978	Ladislav Tandler	Alena Nejedlová	Juraj Lenart / Ladislav Tandler	Milena Hamralová / Alena Nejedlová	Ladislav Tandler / Alena Nejedlová
1979	Lubomir Cechovský	Alena Nejedlová	Petr Cech / Vladimir Hrubý	Eliška Klučková / Alena Nejedlová	Stanislav Kraus / Alena Nejedlová
1980	Richard Hobzik	Eliška Klučková	Radek Goldmann / Richard Hobzik	Sona Karwaczyková / Eliška Klučková	Richard Hobzik / Eliška Klučková
1981	Richard Hobzik	Jitka Cuprová	Jiří Dufek / Richard Hobzik	Irena Ferencová / Yweta Trminková	Richard Hobzik / Jitka Cuprová
1982	Jiří Dufek	Irena Ferencová	Jiří Dufek / Tomas Zapletal	Jaroslava Balcarová / Irena Ferencová	Jiří Dufek / Irena Ferencová
1983	Roman Janostik	Jaroslava Balcarová	Jiří Hlavaty / Pavel Kubis	Jaroslava Balcarová / Jana Drapaková	Jiří Hlavaty / Radka Viktorinová
1984	Radek Heger	Jaroslava Balcarová	Radek Heger / Roman Janostik	Jaroslava Balcarová / Jana Mrstinová	Jaroslav Hawlik / Jaroslava Balcarová
1985	Tomasz Mendrek	Jitka Lacinová	Pavel Brazda / Tomasz Mendrek	Radka Viktorinová / Jitka Lacinová	Tomasz Mendrek / Radka Viktorinová
1986	Tomasz Mendrek	Jitka Lacinová	Radek Svoboda / Tomasz Mendrek	Eva Lacinová / Jitka Lacinová	Tomasz Mendrek / Jitka Lacinová
1987	Radek Svoboda	Jitka Lacinová	Radek Svoboda / Martin Vrkoslav	Eva Lacinová / Jitka Lacinová	Martin Vrkoslav / Jitka Lacinová
1988	Martin Kulhavy	Eva Lacinová	Radek Gregor / Jan Jurka	Eva Lacinová / Dana Matoušková	Jan Doucha / Eva Lacinová
1989	Petr Janda	Veronika Vopalenska	Petr Janda / Petr Horsky	Petra Hlubučková / Dana Matoušková	Petr Janda / Dana Matoušková
1990	Petr Janda	Veronika Vopalenska	Petr Janda / Daniel Gaspar	Veronika Vopalenska / Diana Stadniková	Ladislav Oros / Eva Melounová
1991	Martin Skoupil	Marketa Koudelková	Jan Lanik / Pavel Weigner	Marketa Koudelková / Zuzana Kalivodová	Igor Paar / Zuzana Kalivodová
1992	Jan Kostelecký	Marketa Koudelková	Jan Kostelecký / Jan Panos	Marketa Koudelková / Zuzana Kalivodová	Martin Panos / Zuzana Kalivodová
