= 2015 Brasil Open Grand Prix =

Tournament details
- Dates: 24–29 November 2015
- Level: Grand Prix
- Total prize money: US$50,000
- Venue: Riocentro 4
- Location: Rio de Janeiro, Brazil

Champions
- Men's singles: (China) Lin Dan
- Women's singles: (China) Shen Yaying
- Men's doubles: (China) Huang Kaixiang (China) Zheng Siwei
- Women's doubles: (China) Chen Qingchen (China) Jia Yifan
- Mixed doubles: (China) Zheng Siwei (China) Chen Qingchen

The 2015 Brasil Open Grand Prix was the nineteenth grand prix's badminton tournament of the 2015 BWF Grand Prix and Grand Prix Gold. The tournament was held at the Riocentro Pavilion 4 in Rio de Janeiro, Brazil on November 24–29, 2015 and had a total purse of $50,000. This tournament also serves as the test event for the 2016 Summer Olympics, thus using the Olympic tournament format.

== Men's singles ==
=== Seeds ===
1. (China) Lin Dan
2. (Spain) Pablo Abian
3. (Israel) Misha Zilberman
4. (Austria) David Obernosterer

=== Group A ===
Athlete	Pld	W	L	SW	SL	PF	PA	Pts
(China) Lin Dan	2	2	0	4	0	84	42	2
(Slovakia) Matej Hlinican	2	1	2	2	2	67	70	1
(Brazil) Igor Ibrahim	2	0	2	0	4	45	84	0

24 November 2015
(China) Lin Dan	2–0	(Brazil) Igor Ibrahim	21–12, 21–5
(Slovakia) Matej Hlinican	2–0	(Brazil) Igor Ibrahim	21–16, 21–12
25 November 2015
(China) Lin Dan	2–0	(Slovakia) Matej Hlinican	21–9, 21–16

=== Group B ===
Athlete	Pld	W	L	SW	SL	PF	PA	Pts
(Czech Republic) Petr Koukal	3	3	0	6	0	126	34	3
(Venezuela) Jesús Sánchez	3	2	1	4	3	110	122	2
(Brazil) Thiago Silva Gomes	3	1	2	3	4	117	129	1
(Ukraine) Valery Famin	3	0	3	0	6	58	126	0

24 November 2015
(Venezuela) Jesús Sánchez	2–0	(Ukraine) Valery Famin	21–14, 21–10
(Czech Republic) Petr Koukal	2–0	(Brazil) Thiago Silva Gomes	21–6, 21–13
(Czech Republic) Petr Koukal	2–0	(Ukraine) Valery Famin	21–6, 21–1
(Venezuela) Jesús Sánchez	2–1	(Brazil) Thiago Silva Gomes	18–21, 21–19, 21–16
25 November 2015
(Brazil) Thiago Silva Gomes	2–0	(Ukraine) Valery Famin	21–12, 21–15
(Czech Republic) Petr Koukal	2–0	(Venezuela) Jesús Sánchez	21–4, 21–4

=== Group C ===
Athlete	Pld	W	L	SW	SL	PF	PA	Pts
(Israel) Misha Zilberman	1	1	0	2	0	42	21	1
(Mexico) Job Castillo	1	0	1	0	2	21	42	0
(Brazil) Daniel Paiola	0	0	0	0	0	0	0	0
(Germany) Dieter Domke	0	0	0	0	0	0	0	0

24 November 2015
(Brazil) Daniel Paiola	2–0	(Germany) Dieter Domke	20–11 Retired
(Israel) Misha Zilberman	2–0	(Mexico) Job Castillo	21–16, 21–5
(Israel) Misha Zilberman	WO	(Germany) Dieter Domke
(Mexico) Job Castillo	2–0	(Brazil) Daniel Paiola	21–15, 21–10
25 November 2015
(Israel) Misha Zilberman	WO	(Brazil) Daniel Paiola
(Mexico) Job Castillo	WO	(Germany) Dieter Domke

=== Group D ===
Athlete	Pld	W	L	SW	SL	PF	PA	Pts
(China) Zhu Siyuan	3	3	0	6	0	126	78	3
(Lithuania) Kestutis Navickas	3	2	1	4	3	141	128	2
(Slovenia) Iztok Utrosa	3	1	2	2	5	121	150	1
(United States) Bjorn Seguin	3	0	3	2	6	141	173	0

24 November 2015
(Slovenia) Iztok Utrosa	2–1	(United States) Bjorn Seguin	21–19, 24–26, 23–21
(China) Zhu Siyuan	2–0	(Lithuania) Kestutis Navickas	21–19, 21–17
(China) Zhu Siyuan	2–0	(United States) Bjorn Seguin	21–7, 21–12
(Lithuania) Kestutis Navickas	2–0	(Slovenia) Iztok Utrosa	21–19, 21–11
25 November 2015
(Lithuania) Kestutis Navickas	2–1	(United States) Bjorn Seguin	19–21, 23–21, 21–14
(China) Zhu Siyuan	2–0	(Slovenia) Iztok Utrosa	21–11, 21–12

=== Group E ===
Athlete	Pld	W	L	SW	SL	PF	PA	Pts
(China) Guo Kai	3	3	0	6	2	156	113	3
(Czech Republic) Milan Ludík	3	2	1	5	3	140	138	2
(Mexico) Lino Munoz	3	1	2	4	4	140	128	1
(Brazil) Francielton Farias	3	0	3	0	6	69	126	0

24 November 2015
(China) Guo Kai	2–1	(Mexico) Lino Munoz	14–21, 21–18, 21–8
(Czech Republic) Milan Ludík	2–0	(Brazil) Francielton Farias	21–10, 21–19
(China) Guo Kai	2–1	(Czech Republic) Milan Ludík	16–21, 21–11, 21–12
(Mexico) Lino Munoz	2–0	(Brazil) Francielton Farias	21–12, 21–6
25 November 2015
(China) Guo Kai	2–0	(Brazil) Francielton Farias	21–11, 21–11
(Czech Republic) Milan Ludík	2–1	(Mexico) Lino Munoz	21–12, 12–21, 21–18

=== Group F ===
Athlete	Pld	W	L	SW	SL	PF	PA	Pts
(Cuba) Osleni Guerrero	2	2	0	4	1	96	72	2
(Austria) David Obernosterer	2	1	1	3	2	98	85	1
(Venezuela) Jhonathan Wu Zheng	2	0	2	0	4	48	85	0
(Brazil) Lucas da Silva	0	0	0	0	0	0	0	0

24 November 2015
(Cuba) Osleni Guerrero	2–0	(Brazil) Lucas da Silva	21–5, 21–16
(Austria) David Obernosterer	2–0	(Venezuela) Jhonathan Wu Zheng	21–11, 22–20
(Cuba) Osleni Guerrero	2–0	(Venezuela) Jhonathan Wu Zheng	21–15, 21–2
(Austria) David Obernosterer	2–0	(Brazil) Lucas da Silva	21–9, Retired
25 November 2015
(Venezuela) Jhonathan Wu Zheng	WO	(Brazil) Lucas da Silva
(Cuba) Osleni Guerrero	2–1	(Austria) David Obernosterer	21–16, 12–21, 21–18

=== Group G ===
Athlete	Pld	W	L	SW	SL	PF	PA	Pts
(Ukraine) Artem Pochtarov	2	2	0	4	1	104	90	2
(Brazil) Ygor Coelho de Oliveira	2	1	1	3	3	115	115	1
(Slovakia) Jarolim Vicen	2	0	2	1	4	89	103	0
(Jamaica) Gareth Henry	0	0	0	0	0	0	0	0

24 November 2015
(Brazil) Ygor Coelho de Oliveira	2–1	(Slovakia) Jarolim Vicen	19–21, 21–18, 21–14
(Ukraine) Artem Pochtarov	WO	(Jamaica) Gareth Henry
(Brazil) Ygor Coelho de Oliveira	WO	(Jamaica) Gareth Henry
(Ukraine) Artem Pochtarov	2–0	(Slovakia) Jarolim Vicen	21–17, 21–19
25 November 2015
(Slovakia) Jarolim Vicen	WO	(Jamaica) Gareth Henry
(Ukraine) Artem Pochtarov	2–1	(Brazil) Ygor Coelho de Oliveira	21–13, 19–21, 22–20

=== Group H ===
Athlete	Pld	W	L	SW	SL	PF	PA	Pts
(Spain) Pablo Abian	2	2	0	4	1	102	76	2
(Brazil) Alex Yuwan Tjong	2	1	1	3	2	87	87	1
(Mexico) Arturo Hernández	2	0	2	0	4	58	84	0

24 November 2015
(Spain) Pablo Abian	2–0	(Mexico) Arturo Hernández	21–15, 21–16
(Brazil) Alex Yuwan Tjong	2–0	(Mexico) Arturo Hernández	21–15, 21–12
25 November 2015
(Spain) Pablo Abian	2–1	(Brazil) Alex Yuwan Tjong	18–21, 21–16, 21–8

=== Finals ===
Round of 16
1	(China) Lin Dan	21	21
(Czech Republic) Milan Ludík	12	13
(Czech Republic) Petr Koukal	21	21
(Slovakia) Matej Hlinican	15	4
3	(Israel) Misha Zilberman	8	16
(Lithuania) Kestutis Navickas	21	21
(China) Zhu Siyuan	21	21
(Mexico) Job Castillo	9	9
(Brazil) Y C de Oliveira	21	16	9
(China) Guo Kai	15	21	21
4	(Austria) David Obernosterer	13	17
(Cuba) Osleni Guerrero	21	21
(Brazil) Alex Yuwan Tjong	17	11
(Ukraine) Artem Pochtarov	21	21
(Venezuela) Jesús Sánchez	10	8
2	(Spain) Pablo Abian	21	21

Quarterfinals
1	(China) Lin Dan	21	19	21
(Czech Republic) Petr Koukal	12	21	11
(Lithuania) Kestutis Navickas	21	6
(China) Zhu Siyuan	23	21
(China) Guo Kai	21	21
(Cuba) Osleni Guerrero	12	9
(Ukraine) Artem Pochtarov	21	8	14
2	(Spain) Pablo Abian	12	21	21

Semifinals
1	(China) Lin Dan	15	21	21
(China) Zhu Siyuan	21	12	15
(China) Guo Kai	22	15
2	(Spain) Pablo Abian	24	21

Final
1	(China) Lin Dan	21	21
2	(Spain) Pablo Abian	13	17

== Women's singles ==
=== Seeds ===
1. (United States) Rong Schafer
2. (Czech Republic) Kristina Gavnholt
3. (Brazil) Lohaynny Vicente
4. (Brazil) Fabiana Silva

=== Group A ===
Athlete	Pld	W	L	SW	SL	PF	PA	Pts
(China) Li Yun	3	3	0	6	1	142	94	3
(United States) Rong Schafer	3	2	1	5	2	144	87	2
(Czech Republic) Zuzana Pavelkova	3	1	2	2	4	78	115	1
(Brazil) Paloma da Silva	3	0	3	0	6	61	129	0

24 November 2015
(China) Li Yun	2–0	(Czech Republic) Zuzana Pavelkova	21–5, 21–9
(United States) Rong Schafer	2–0	(Brazil) Paloma da Silva	21–4, 21–16
25 November 2015
(China) Li Yun	2–1	(United States) Rong Schafer	23–21, 14–21, 21–18
(Czech Republic) Zuzana Pavelkova	2–0	(Brazil) Paloma da Silva	21–9, 24–22
26 November 2015
(United States) Rong Schafer	2–0	(Czech Republic) Zuzana Pavelkova	21–14, 21–5
(China) Li Yun	2–0	(Brazil) Paloma da Silva	21–13, 21–7

=== Group B ===
Athlete	Pld	W	L	SW	SL	PF	PA	Pts
(Austria) Elisabeth Baldauf	3	3	0	6	1	145	78	3
(Brazil) Lohaynny Vicente	3	2	1	5	2	123	102	2
(Mexico) Mariana Ugalde	3	1	2	2	4	97	93	1
(India) Lalita Dahiya	3	0	3	0	6	34	126	0

24 November 2015
(Austria) Elisabeth Baldauf	2–0	(Mexico) Mariana Ugalde	21–10, 21–19
(Brazil) Lohaynny Vicente	2–0	(India) Lalita Dahiya	21–10, 21–5
25 November 2015
(Austria) Elisabeth Baldauf	2–0	(India) Lalita Dahiya	21–2, 21–8
(Brazil) Lohaynny Vicente	2–0	(Mexico) Mariana Ugalde	21–9, 21–17
26 November 2015
(Austria) Elisabeth Baldauf	2–1	(Brazil) Lohaynny Vicente	21–9, 19–21, 21–9
(Mexico) Mariana Ugalde	2–0	(India) Lalita Dahiya	21–7, 21–2

=== Group C ===
Athlete	Pld	W	L	SW	SL	PF	PA	Pts
(China) Shen Yaying	3	3	0	6	0	126	57	3
(Lithuania) Akvilė Stapušaitytė	3	2	1	4	2	107	93	2
(Brazil) Fabiana Silva	3	1	2	2	5	96	130	1
(Mexico) Haramara Gaitán	3	0	3	1	6	87	136	0

24 November 2015
(China) Shen Yaying	2–0	(Brazil) Fabiana Silva	21–7, 21–9
(Lithuania) Akvilė Stapušaitytė	2–0	(Mexico) Haramara Gaitán	21–14, 21–9
25 November 2015
(Lithuania) Akvilė Stapušaitytė	2–0	(Brazil) Fabiana Silva	21–15, 21–13
(China) Shen Yaying	2–0	(Mexico) Haramara Gaitán	21–8, 21–10
26 November 2015
(Brazil) Fabiana Silva	2–1	(Mexico) Haramara Gaitán	21–11, 10–21, 21–14
(China) Shen Yaying	2–0	(Lithuania) Akvilė Stapušaitytė	21–6, 21–17

=== Group D ===
Athlete	Pld	W	L	SW	SL	PF	PA	Pts
(Czech Republic) Kristina Gavnholt	2	2	0	4	0	84	35	2
(France) Sashina Vignes Waran	2	1	1	2	2	69	64	1
(Brazil) Ana Paula Campos	2	0	2	0	4	30	84	0
(Venezuela) Damaris Ortiz	0	0	0	0	0	0	0	0

24 November 2015
(France) Sashina Vignes Waran	2–0	(Brazil) Ana Paula Campos	21–6, 21–16
(Czech Republic) Kristina Gavnholt	WO	(Venezuela) Damaris Ortiz
25 November 2015
(Czech Republic) Kristina Gavnholt	2–0	(Brazil) Ana Paula Campos	21–5, 21–3
(France) Sashina Vignes Waran	WO	(Venezuela) Damaris Ortiz
26 November 2015
(Czech Republic) Kristina Gavnholt	2–0	(France) Sashina Vignes Waran	21–12, 21–15
(Brazil) Ana Paula Campos	WO	(Venezuela) Damaris Ortiz

=== Finals ===
Quarterfinals
(China) Li Yun	17	21	21
1	(United States) Rong Schafer	21	16	13
(Austria) Elisabeth Baldauf	18	18
(Lithuania) Akvilė Stapušaitytė	21	21
3	(Brazil) Lohaynny Vicente	18	10
(China) Shen Yaying	21	21
(France) Sashina Vignes Waran	15	11
2	(Czech Republic) Kristina Gavnholt	21	21

Semifinals
(China) Li Yun	21	21
(Lithuania) Akvilė Stapušaitytė	10	8
(China) Shen Yaying	21	21
2	(Czech Republic) Kristina Gavnholt	7	15

Final
(China) Li Yun	22	17	22
(China) Shen Yaying	20	21	24

== Men's doubles ==
=== Seeds ===
1. (India) Manu Attri / B. Sumeeth Reddy
2. (China) Wang Yilyu / Zhang Wen

=== Group A ===
Athlete	Pld	W	L	SW	SL	PF	PA	Pts
(India) Manu Attri (India) B. Sumeeth Reddy	1	1	0	2	1	60	57	1
(England) Peter Briggs (England) Tom Wolfenden	1	0	1	1	2	57	60	0
(Brazil) Paulo Lucas Rosa Oliveira (Brazil) Thiago Silva Gomes	0	0	0	0	0	0	0	0

25 November 2015
(India) Attri / Reddy	2–0	(Brazil) Oliveira / Gomes	21–13, 21–9
(England) Briggs / Wolfenden	WO	(Brazil) Oliveira / Gomes
26 November 2015
(India) Attri / Reddy	2–1	(England) Briggs / Wolfenden	18–21, 21–18, 21–18

=== Group B ===
Athlete	Pld	W	L	SW	SL	PF	PA	Pts
(China) Huang Kaixiang (China) Zheng Siwei	3	3	0	6	0	126	65	3
(Germany) Michael Fuchs (Germany) Johannes Schoettler	3	2	1	4	2	107	84	2
(United States) Phillip Chew (United States) Sattawat Pongnairat	3	1	2	2	4	96	102	1
(Venezuela) Jesús Sánchez (Venezuela) Jhonathan Wu Zheng	3	0	3	0	6	48	126	0

25 November 2015
(China) Huang / Zheng	2–0	(United States) Chew / Pongnairat	21–18, 21–7
(Germany) Fuchs / Schoettler	2–0	(Venezuela) Sánchez / Wu Zheng	21–7, 21–6
(China) Huang / Zheng	2–0	(Germany) Fuchs / Schoettler	21–13, 21–10
(United States) Chew / Pongnairat	2–0	(Venezuela) Sánchez / Wu Zheng	21–7, 21–11
26 November 2015
(Germany) Fuchs / Schoettler	2–0	(United States) Chew / Pongnairat	21–12, 21–17
(China) Huang / Zheng	2–0	(Venezuela) Sánchez / Wu Zheng	21–7, 21–10

=== Group C ===
Athlete	Pld	W	L	SW	SL	PF	PA	Pts
(Canada) Adrian Liu (Canada) Derrick Ng	1	1	0	2	0	42	28	1
(Mexico) Job Castillo (Mexico) Lino Muñoz	1	0	1	0	2	28	42	0
(Brazil) Hugo Arthuso (Brazil) Daniel Paiola	0	0	0	0	0	0	0	0
(Ukraine) Artem Pochtarov (Ukraine) Valery Famin	0	0	0	0	0	0	0	0

25 November 2015
(Canada) Liu / Ng	2–0	(Ukraine) Pochtarev / Famin	21–9, 21–2
(Mexico) Castillo / Muñoz	2–0	(Brazil) Arthuso / Paiola	26–24, 21–14
(Canada) Liu / Ng	WO	(Brazil) Arthuso / Paiola
(Mexico) Castillo / Muñoz	2–0	(Ukraine) Pochtarov / Famin	21–6, Retired
26 November 2015
(Canada) Liu / Ng	2–0	(Mexico) Castillo / Muñoz	21–16, 21–12
(Ukraine) Pochtarev / Famin	WO	(Brazil) Arthuso / Paiola

=== Group D ===
Athlete	Pld	W	L	SW	SL	PF	PA	Pts
(China) Wang Yilyu (China) Zhang Wen	2	2	0	4	0	84	26	2
(United States) Mathew Fogarty (United States) Bjorn Seguin	2	1	1	2	2	57	71	1
(Brazil) Francielton Farias (Brazil) Igor Ibrahim	2	0	2	0	4	40	84	0

25 November 2015
(China) Wang / Zhang	2–0	(Brazil) Farias / Ibrahim	21–6, 21–5
(United States) Fogarty / Seguin	2–0	(Brazil) Farias / Ibrahim	21–17, 21–12
26 November 2015
(China) Wang / Zhang	2–0	(United States) Fogarty / Seguin	21–7, 21–8

=== Finals ===
Quarterfinals

Semifinals

Final

1
- (India) Manu Attri
- (India) B. Sumeeth Reddy
21
21

- (United States) Mathew Fogarty
- (United States) Bjorn Seguin
14
9

1
- (India) Manu Attri
- (India) B. Sumeeth Reddy
17
14

- (China) Huang Kaixiang
- (China) Zheng Siwei
21
21

- (China) Huang Kaixiang
- (China) Zheng Siwei
29
21

- (England) Peter Briggs
- (England) Tom Wolfenden
27
8

- (China) Huang Kaixiang
- (China) Zheng Siwei
22
21
21

2
- (China) Wang Yilyu
- (China) Zhang Wen
24
10
14

- (Germany) Michael Fuchs
- (Germany) Johannes Schoettler
21
20
21

- (Canada) Adrian Liu
- (Canada) Derrick Ng
14
22
18

- (Germany) Michael Fuchs
- (Germany) Johannes Schoettler
21
16
16

2
- (China) Wang Yilyu
- (China) Zhang Wen
19
21
21

- (Mexico) Job Castillo
- (Mexico) Lino Muñoz
11
12

2
- (China) Wang Yilyu
- (China) Zhang Wen
21
21

== Women's doubles ==
=== Seeds ===
1. (Netherlands) Eefje Muskens / Selena Piek
2. (Germany) Johanna Goliszewski / Carla Nelte

=== Group A ===
Athlete	Pld	W	L	SW	SL	PF	PA	Pts
(Netherlands) Eefje Muskens (Netherlands) Selena Piek	3	3	0	6	1	140	110	3
(United States) Eva Lee (United States) Paula Lynn Obanana	3	2	1	4	2	118	115	2
(Germany) Isabel Herttrich (Germany) Birgit Michels	3	1	2	3	4	131	130	1
(Brazil) Lohaynny Vicente (Brazil) Luana Vicente	3	0	3	0	6	92	126	0

24 November 2015
(United States) Lee / Obanana	2–0	(Germany) Herttrich / Michels	22–20, 21–16
(Netherlands) Muskens / Piek	2–0	(Brazil) Vicnete / Vicente	21–11, 21–13
25 November 2015
(United States) Lee / Obanana	2–0	(Brazil) Vicnete / Vicente	21–19, 21–18
(Netherlands) Muskens / Piek	2–1	(Germany) Herttrich / Michels	14–21, 21–14, 21–18
26 November 2015
(Netherlands) Muskens / Piek	2–0	(United States) Lee / Obanana	21–14, 21–19
(Germany) Herttrich / Michels	2–0	(Brazil) Vicnete / Vicente	21–17, 21–14

=== Group B ===
Athlete	Pld	W	L	SW	SL	PF	PA	Pts
(China) Chen Qingchen (China) Jia Yifan	3	3	0	6	0	126	69	3
(Germany) Johanna Goliszewski (Germany) Carla Nelte	3	2	1	4	3	138	112	2
(Canada) Alex Bruce (Canada) Phyllis Chan	3	1	2	3	4	113	130	1
(Brazil) Paloma da Silva (Brazil) Fabiana Silva	3	0	3	0	6	60	126	0

24 November 2015
(China) Chen / Jia	2–0	(Canada) Bruce / Chan	21–11, 21–8
(Germany) Goliszewski / Nelte	2–0	(Brazil) da Silva / Silva	21–11, 21–7
25 November 2015
(Germany) Goliszewski / Nelte	2–1	(Canada) Bruce / Chan	21–11, 20–22, 21–19
(China) Chen / Jia	2–0	(Brazil) da Silva / Silva	21–6, 21–10
26 November 2015
(China) Chen / Jia	2–0	(Germany) Goliszewski / Nelte	21–17, 21–17
(Canada) Bruce / Chan	2–0	(Brazil) da Silva / Silva	21–7, 21–19

=== Finals ===
Semifinals

Final

1
- (Netherlands) Eefje Muskens
- (Netherlands) Selena Piek
21
21

- (United States) Eva Lee
- (United States) Paula Lynn Obanana
9
15

1
- (Netherlands) Eefje Muskens
- (Netherlands) Selena Piek
17
14

- (China) Chen Qingchen
- (China) Jia Yifan
21
21

2
- (Germany) Johanna Goliszewski
- (Germany) Carla Nelte
15
16

- (China) Chen Qingchen
- (China) Jia Yifan
21
21

== Mixed doubles ==
=== Seeds ===
1. (Germany) Michael Fuchs / Birgit Michels
2. (Netherlands) Jacco Arends / Selena Piek
3. (Singapore) Danny Bawa Chrisnanta / Vanessa Neo Yu Yan
4. (United States) Philip Chew / Jamie Subandhi

=== Group A ===
Athlete	Pld	W	L	SW	SL	PF	PA	Pts
(China) Zhang Wen (China) Jia Yifan	3	3	0	6	1	142	96	3
(Germany) Michael Fuchs (Germany) Birgit Michels	3	2	1	4	3	129	111	2
(Canada) Toby Ng (Canada) Alex Bruce	3	1	2	4	4	145	138	1
(Brazil) Igor Ibrahim (Brazil) Paloma da Silva	3	0	3	0	6	55	126	0

24 November 2015
(China) Zhang / Jia	2–1	(Canada) Ng / Bruce	21–19, 16–21, 21–11
(Germany) Fuchs / Michels	2–0	(Brazil) Ibrahim / da Silva	21–8, 21–9
(China) Zhang / Jia	2–0	(Germany) Fuchs / Michels	21–14, 21–15
(Canada) Ng / Bruce	2–0	(Brazil) Ibrahim / da Silva	21–11, 21–11
25 November 2015
(Germany) Fuchs / Michels	2–1	(Canada) Ng / Bruce	16–21, 21–14, 21–17
(China) Zhang / Jia	2–0	(Brazil) Ibrahim / da Silva	21–9, 21–7

=== Group B ===
Athlete	Pld	W	L	SW	SL	PF	PA	Pts
(Russia) Evgenij Dremin (Russia) Evgenia Dimova	4	4	0	8	0	168	87	4
(Singapore) Danny Bawa Chrisnanta (Singapore) Vanessa Neo Yu Yan	4	3	1	6	2	154	84	3
(Brazil) Alex Yuwan Tjong (Brazil) Luana Vicente	4	2	2	4	4	130	116	2
(Mexico) Arturo Hernandez (Mexico) Mariana Ugalde	4	1	3	2	6	90	155	1
(India) Dinesh Chaudhry (India) Lalita Dahiya	4	0	4	0	8	68	168	0

24 November 2015
(Russia) Dremin / Dimova	2–0	(India) Chaudhry / Dahiya	21–9, 21–5
(Singapore) Chrisnanta / Neo	2–0	(Mexico) Hernandez / Ugalde	21–2, 21–9
(Brazil) Tjong / Vicnete	2–0	(Mexico) Hernandez / Ugalde	21–8, 22–13
(Singapore) Chrisnanta / Neo	2–0	(India) Chaudhry / Dahiya	21–9, 21–5
25 November 2015
(Russia) Dremin / Dimova	2–0	(Mexico) Hernandez / Ugalde	21–9, 21–7
(Singapore) Chrisnanta / Neo	2–0	(Brazil) Tjong / Vicnete	21–5, 21–12
(Mexico) Hernandez / Ugalde	2–0	(India) Chaudhry / Dahiya	21–19, 21–10
(Russia) Dremin / Dimova	2–0	(Brazil) Tjong / Vicnete	21–13, 21–16
26 November 2015
(Russia) Dremin / Dimova	2–0	(Singapore) Chrisnanta / Neo	21–9, 21–19
(Brazil) Tjong / Vicnete	2–0	(India) Chaudhry / Dahiya	21–6, 21–5

=== Group C ===
Athlete	Pld	W	L	SW	SL	PF	PA	Pts
(China) Zheng Siwei (China) Chen Qingchen	3	3	0	6	0	126	62	3
(Australia) Robin Middleton (Australia) Leanne Choo	3	2	1	4	2	102	94	2
(United States) Phillip Chew (United States) Jamie Subandhi	3	1	2	2	5	120	130	1
(Austria) David Obernosterer (Austria) Elisabeth Baldauf	3	0	3	1	6	82	144	0
(Venezuela) Jhonatan Wu Zheng (Venezuela) Damaris Ortiz	0	0	0	0	0	0	0	0

24 November 2015
(China) Zheng / Chen	2–0	(Austria) Obernosterer / Baldauf	21–7, 21–11
(United States) Chew / Subandhi	WO	(Venezuela) Wu Zheng / Ortiz
(United States) Chew / Subandhi	2–1	(Austria) Obernosterer / Baldauf	21–10, 18–21, 21–15
(Australia) Middleton / Choo	WO	(Venezuela) Wu Zheng / Ortiz
25 November 2015
(Australia) Middleton / Choo	2–0	(United States) Chew / Subandhi	21–16, 21–18
(China) Zheng / Chen	WO	(Venezuela) Wu Zheng / Ortiz
(China) Zheng / Chen	2–0	(Australia) Middleton / Choo	21–7, 21–11
(Austria) Obernosterer / Baldauf	WO	(Venezuela) Wu Zheng / Ortiz
26 November 2015
(China) Zheng / Chen	2–0	(United States) Chew / Subandhi	21–14, 21–12
(Australia) Middleton / Choo	2–0	(Austria) Obernosterer / Baldauf	21–9, 21–9

=== Group D ===
Athlete	Pld	W	L	SW	SL	PF	PA	Pts
(Netherlands) Jacco Arends (Netherlands) Selena Piek	3	3	0	6	1	149	114	3
(Russia) Vitalij Durkin (Russia) Nina Vislova	3	2	1	5	2	133	119	2
(Canada) Phillipe Charron (Canada) Phyllis Chan	3	1	2	2	5	125	137	1
(Brazil) Hugo Arthuso (Brazil) Fabiana Silva	3	0	3	1	6	101	138	0

24 November 2015
(Netherlands) Arends / Piek	2–0	(Brazil) Arthuso / Silva	21–13, 21–17
(Russia) Durkin / Vislova	2–0	(Brazil) Arthuso / Silva	21–9, 21–10
(Netherlands) Arends / Piek	2–0	(Canada) Charron / Chan	21–15, 22–20
(Russia) Durkin / Vislova	2–0	(Canada) Charron / Chan	21–18, 21–18
25 November 2015
(Canada) Charron / Chan	2–1	(Brazil) Arthuso / Silva	21–15, 12–21, 21–16
(Netherlands) Arends / Piek	2–1	(Russia) Durkin / Vislova	22–24, 21–11, 21–14

=== Finals ===
Quarterfinals

Semifinals

Final

- (China) Zhang Wen
- (China) Jia Yifan
21
13
21

3
- (Singapore) Danny Bawa Chrisnanta
- (Singapore) Vanessa Neo Yu Yan
15
21
10

- (China) Zhang Wen
- (China) Jia Yifan
17
18

- (Russia) Evgenij Dremin
- (Russia) Evgenia Dimova
21
21

- (Russia) Evgenij Dremin
- (Russia) Evgenia Dimova
21
21

- (Australia) Robin Middleton
- (Australia) Leanne Choo
10
18

- (Russia) Evgenij Dremin
- (Russia) Evgenia Dimova
12
10

- (China) Zheng Siwei
- (China) Chen Qingchen
21
21

- (Russia) Vitalij Durkin
- (Russia) Nina Vislova
11
8

- (China) Zheng Siwei
- (China) Chen Qingchen
21
21

- (China) Zheng Siwei
- (China) Chen Qingchen
19
21
21

2
- (Netherlands) Jacco Arends
- (Netherlands) Selena Piek
21
19
13

1
- (Germany) Michael Fuchs
- (Germany) Birgit Michels
12
21
17

2
- (Netherlands) Jacco Arends
- (Netherlands) Selena Piek
21
17
21

Preceded by 2015 Scottish Open Grand Prix	BWF Grand Prix and Grand Prix Gold; 2015 BWF season	Succeeded by 2015 Indonesian Masters Grand Prix Gold
