= Kožešník =

Kožešník (feminine: Kožešníková) is a Czech-language occupational surname literally meaning "furrier". Notable people with the surname include:

- Jaroslav Kožešník, Czechoslovak academician
- Zdenek Kozesnik, Czechoslovak national badminton champion
