= Shen Yaying =

Chinese badminton player (born 1994)

Shen Yaying 沈雅颖
Personal information
- Born: 17 January 1994 (age 32) Zhangzhou, Fujian, China

Sport
- Country: China
- Sport: Badminton

Women's singles
- Highest ranking: 48 (WS) (21 January 2016)
- Current ranking: 68 (WS) (10 March 2016)
- BWF profile
Medal record
Women's badminton
Representing China
Asian Junior Championships
Silver medal – second place	2012 Gimcheon	Mixed team
Silver medal – second place	2011 Lucknow	Girls' singles

Shen Yaying (Chinese: 沈雅颖; born 17 January 1994) is a Chinese badminton player. She was the champion of the 2015 Brasil Open Grand Prix tournament in the women's singles event.

== Achievements ==
=== Asia Junior Championships ===
Girls' singles
Year	Venue	Opponent	Score	Result
2011	Babu Banarasi Das Indoor Stadium; Lucknow, India	(China) Sun Yu	8–21, 13–21	Silver

=== BWF Grand Prix ===
The BWF Grand Prix has two levels, the Grand Prix and Grand Prix Gold. It is a series of badminton tournaments sanctioned by the Badminton World Federation (BWF) since 2007.

Women's singles
Year	Tournament	Opponent	Score	Result
2015	Brasil Open	(China) Li Yun	20–22, 21–17, 24–22	(gold) Winner
2014	China Masters	(China) Liu Xin	12–21, 18–21	(silver) Runner-up

BWF Grand Prix Gold tournament
BWF Grand Prix tournament
