= Slovak National Badminton Championships =

The Slovak National Badminton Championships is a tournament organized to crown the best badminton players in Slovakia.

The tournament started in 1993 and is held every year.

== Past winners ==
Year	Men's singles	Women's singles	Men's doubles	Women's doubles	Mixed doubles
1993	Juraj Brestovský	Ľuba Hanzušová	Juraj Brestovský; Igor Novák	Ľuba Hanzušová; Aurita Hirková	Peter Púdela; Martina Švecová
1994	Juraj Brestovský	Ľuba Hanzušová	Róbert Cyprian; Peter Púdela	Ľuba Hanzušová; Daniela Tomášová	Peter Púdela; Martina Švecová
1995	Igor Novák	Ľuba Hanzušová	Róbert Cyprian; Peter Púdela	Katarína Pokorná; Alexandra Felgrová	Peter Púdela; Alexandra Felgrová
1996	Marián Šulko	Alexandra Felgrová	Juraj Brestovský; Igor Novák	Radka Majorská; Barbora Bobrovská	Jaroslav Heleš; Katarína Pokorná
1997	Pavel Mečár	Kvetoslava Orlovská	Marián Šulko; Marek Navrátil	Barbora Bobrovská; Radka Majorská	Juraj Brestovský; Zuzana Kenížová
1998	Pavel Mečár	Kvetoslava Orlovská	Pavel Mečár; Jaroslav Marek	Kvetoslava Orlovská; Gabriela Zabavníková	Pavel Mečár; Barbora Bobrovská
1999	Marián Šulko	Kvetoslava Orlovská	Pavel Mečár; Marián Šulko	Barbora Bobrovská; Alexandra Felgrová	Pavel Mečár; Barbora Bobrovská
2000	Marián Šulko	Gabriela Zabavníková	Marián Šulko; Pavel Mečár	Kvetoslava Orlovská; Gabriela Zabavníková	Pavel Mečár; Barbora Bobrovská
2001	Marián Šulko	Gabriela Zabavníková	Marián Šulko; Pavel Mečár	Barbora Bobrovská; Eva Sládeková	Pavel Mečár; Barbora Bobrovská
2002	Lukáš Klačanský	Kvetoslava Orlovská	Marián Šulko; Pavel Mečár	Kvetoslava Orlovská; Gabriela Zabavníková	Pavel Mečár; Barbora Bobrovská
2003	Marián Šulko	Gabriela Zabavníková	Marián Šulko; Pavel Mečár	Zuzana Orlovská; Gabriela Zabavníková	Pavel Mečár; Barbora Bobrovská
2004	Marián Šulko	Kvetoslava Orlovská	Marián Šulko; Pavel Mečár	Barbora Bobrovská; Eva Sládeková	Pavel Mečár; Barbora Bobrovská
2005	Michal Matejka	Eva Sládeková	Marián Šulko; Pavel Mečár	Alexandra Felgrová; Kristína Ludíková	Pavel Mečár; Barbora Bobrovská
2006	Marián Šulko	Kristína Ludíková	Michal Matejka; Marián Šulko	Alexandra Felgrová; Kristína Ludíková	Ladislav Tomčko; Kvetoslava Orlovská
2007	Marián Šulko	Eva Sládeková	Vladimír Závada; Marián Smrek	Kvetoslava Orlovská; Zuzana Orlovská	Vladimír Turlík; Gabriela Zabavníková
2008	Marián Šulko	Kvetoslava Orlovská	Vladimír Závada; Marián Smrek	Júlia Turzáková; Gabriela Zabavníková	Marián Smrek; Kvetoslava Orlovská
2009	Michal Matejka	Monika Fašungová	Vladimír Závada; Marián Smrek	Barbora Bobrovská; Zuzana Orlovská	Vladimír Závada; Zuzana Orlovská
2010	Michal Matejka	Ivana Kubíková	Marián Šulko; Pavel Mečár	Barbora Bobrovská; Zuzana Orlovská	Vladimír Závada; Zuzana Orlovská
2011	Jarolím Vícen	Monika Fašungová	Ladislav Tomčko; Pavel Mečár	Barbora Bobrovská; Zuzana Orlovská	Milan Ludík; Kvetoslava Sopková
2012	Jarolím Vícen	Monika Fašungová	Michal Matejka; Marián Šulko	Júlia Turzáková; Gabriela Zabavníková	Vladimír Závada; Zuzana Orlovská
2013	Juraj Vachálek	Monika Fašungová	Jarolím Vícen; Martin Kožár	Ivana Kubíková; Zuzana Orlovská	Ladislav Tomčko; Gabriela Zabavníková
2014	Jarolím Vícen	Martina Repiská	Matej Hliničan; Michal Matejka	Jana Čižnárová; Gabriela Zabavníková	Ladislav Tomčko; Gabriela Zabavníková
2015	Matej Hliničan	Martina Repiská	Milan Dratva; Bohumil Kašela	Zuzana Palková; Katarína Vargová	Milan Dratva; Katarína Šariščanová
2016	Jarolím Vícen	Martina Repiská	Juraj Vachalek; Miroslav Haring	Zuzana Palková; Katarína Vargová	Milan Dratva; Zuzana Palková
2017	Milan Dratva	Martina Repiská	Juraj Vachalek; Miroslav Haring	Zuzana Palková; Katarína Vargová	Milan Dratva; Zuzana Palková
2018	Milan Dratva	Martina Repiská	Juraj Vachalek; Miroslav Haring	Mia Tarcalová; Katarína Vargová	Jakub Horák; Mia Tarcalová
2019	Milan Dratva	Katarína Vargová	Andrej Antoška; Jakub Horák	Mia Tarcalová; Katarína Vargová	Milan Dratva; Alžbeta Peruňská
2021	Jarolím Vícen	Martina Repiská	Jarolím Vícen; Juraj Vachalek	Alžbeta Peruňská; Lucia Vojteková	Juraj Vachalek; Alžbeta Peruňská
2022	Milan Dratva	Martina Repiská	Jarolím Vícen; Juraj Vachalek	Alžbeta Peruňská; Lucia Vojteková	Milan Dratva; Katarína Vargová
2023	Milan Dratva	Sofia Slosiariková	Andrej Suchý; Simeon Suchý	Johanka Ivanovičová; Lea Výbochová	Andrej Suchý; Johanka Ivanovičová

- In 2020 Slovak National Badminton Championship was not held due to COVID-19 regulations.
