= Chen Qingchen =

Chinese badminton player (born 1997)

Chen Qingchen 陈清晨
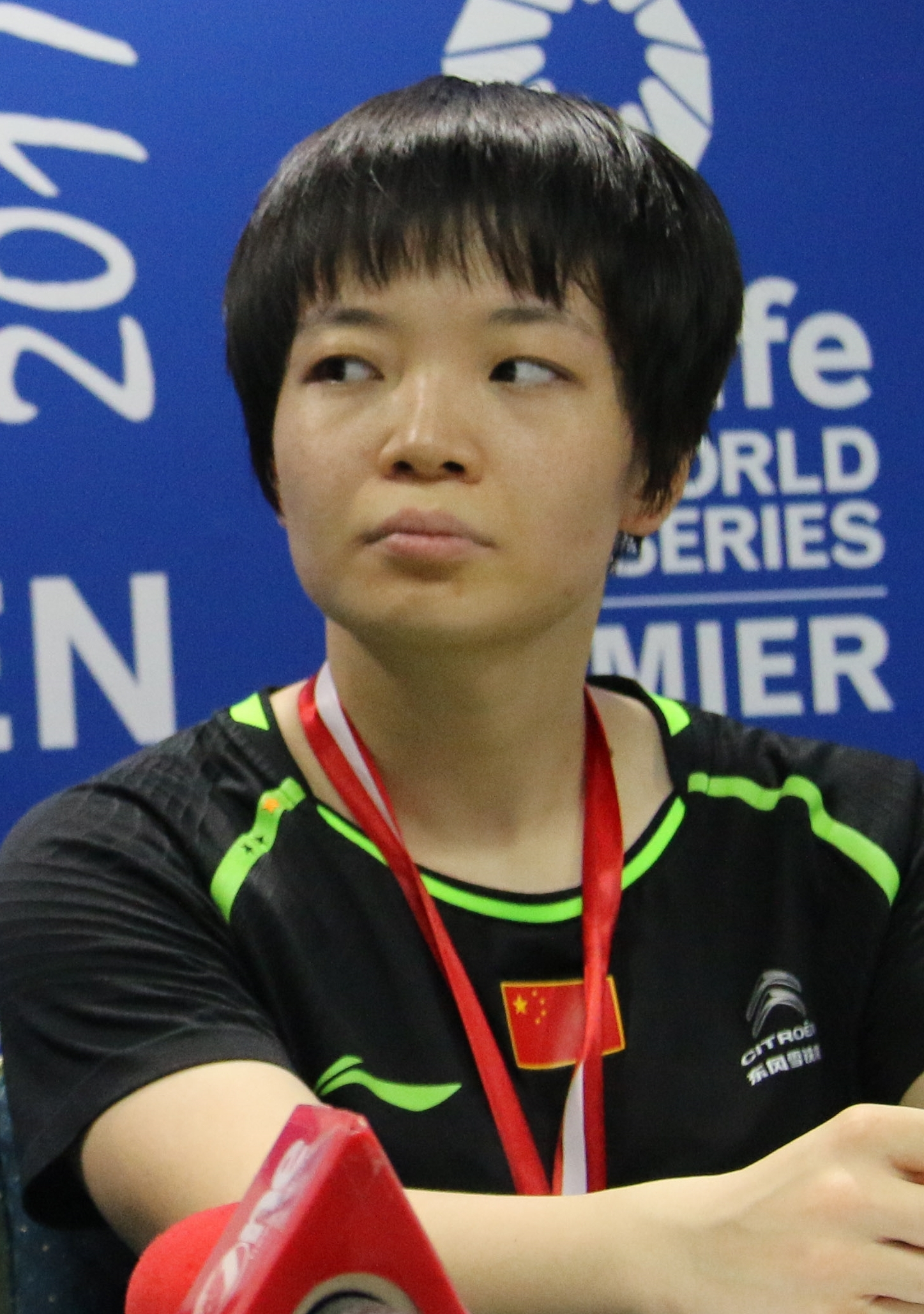
- Chen at the 2017 Indonesia Super Series Premier

Personal information
- Born: 23 June 1997 (age 29) Xingning, Guangdong, China
- Height: 1.64 m (5 ft 5 in)

Sport
- Country: China
- Sport: Badminton
- Handedness: Right
- Retired: 26 October 2025

Women's & Mixed doubles
- Highest ranking: 1 (WD with Jia Yifan, 2 November 2017); 1 (XD with Zheng Siwei, 22 December 2016)
- BWF profile
Medal record
Women's badminton
Representing China
Olympic Games
Gold medal – first place	2024 Paris	Women's doubles
Silver medal – second place	2020 Tokyo	Women's doubles
World Championships
Gold medal – first place	2017 Glasgow	Women's doubles
Gold medal – first place	2021 Huelva	Women's doubles
Gold medal – first place	2022 Tokyo	Women's doubles
Gold medal – first place	2023 Copenhagen	Women's doubles
Silver medal – second place	2017 Glasgow	Mixed doubles
Sudirman Cup
Gold medal – first place	2019 Nanning	Mixed team
Gold medal – first place	2021 Vantaa	Mixed team
Gold medal – first place	2023 Suzhou	Mixed team
Gold medal – first place	2025 Xiamen	Mixed team
Silver medal – second place	2017 Gold Coast	Mixed team
Uber Cup
Gold medal – first place	2016 Kunshan	Women's team
Gold medal – first place	2020 Aarhus	Women's team
Gold medal – first place	2024 Chengdu	Women's team
Silver medal – second place	2022 Bangkok	Women's team
Bronze medal – third place	2018 Bangkok	Women's team
Asian Games
Gold medal – first place	2018 Jakarta–Palembang	Women's doubles
Gold medal – first place	2022 Hangzhou	Women's doubles
Silver medal – second place	2018 Jakarta–Palembang	Women's team
Silver medal – second place	2022 Hangzhou	Women's team
Asian Championships
Gold medal – first place	2019 Wuhan	Women's doubles
Gold medal – first place	2022 Manila	Women's doubles
Bronze medal – third place	2024 Ningbo	Women's doubles
Bronze medal – third place	2025 Ningbo	Women's doubles
Asia Mixed Team Championships
Silver medal – second place	2025 Qingdao	Mixed team
Bronze medal – third place	2017 Ho Chi Minh	Mixed team
East Asian Games
Gold medal – first place	2013 Tianjin	Women's team
World Junior Championships
Gold medal – first place	2012 Chiba	Mixed team
Gold medal – first place	2013 Bangkok	Mixed doubles
Gold medal – first place	2014 Alor Setar	Girls' doubles
Gold medal – first place	2014 Alor Setar	Mixed doubles
Gold medal – first place	2014 Alor Setar	Mixed team
Gold medal – first place	2015 Lima	Girls' doubles
Gold medal – first place	2015 Lima	Mixed doubles
Gold medal – first place	2015 Lima	Mixed team
Silver medal – second place	2013 Bangkok	Girls' doubles
Bronze medal – third place	2012 Chiba	Mixed doubles
Bronze medal – third place	2013 Bangkok	Mixed team
Asian Junior Championships
Gold medal – first place	2013 Kota Kinabalu	Mixed team
Gold medal – first place	2014 Taipei	Girls' doubles
Gold medal – first place	2014 Taipei	Mixed doubles
Gold medal – first place	2014 Taipei	Mixed team
Gold medal – first place	2015 Bangkok	Mixed doubles
Gold medal – first place	2015 Bangkok	Mixed team
Silver medal – second place	2012 Gimcheon	Mixed team
Silver medal – second place	2013 Kota Kinabalu	Girls' doubles
Silver medal – second place	2015 Bangkok	Girls' doubles
Bronze medal – third place	2012 Gimcheon	Girls' doubles
Bronze medal – third place	2012 Gimcheon	Mixed doubles
Bronze medal – third place	2013 Kota Kinabalu	Mixed doubles

Chen Qingchen
- Traditional Chinese: 陳清晨
- Simplified Chinese: 陈清晨
Transcriptions
Standard Mandarin
- Hanyu Pinyin: Chén Qīngchén
- IPA: [ʈʂʰə̌n.tɕʰíŋ.ʈʂʰə̌n]
Hakka
- Romanization: Chhṳ̀n Chhîn-sṳ̀n

Chen Qingchen (Chinese: 陈清晨; pinyin: Chén Qīngchén; born 23 June 1997) is a Chinese former badminton player who specialized in doubles. She is an Olympic champion, four-time World Champion, two-time Asian Games gold medalist, and two-time Asian Champion. With partner Jia Yifan, Chen won silver in women's doubles at the 2020 Summer Olympics and gold in the same event at the 2024 Summer Olympics.

Chen has achieved a world-first ranking in two categories: mixed doubles with Zheng Siwei in December 2016, and women's doubles with Jia Yifan in November 2017.

Chen started her achievements under her coach Li Yongbo, with partner in the women's doubles Jia Yifan, and in the mixed doubles Zheng Siwei. She ended the 2016 BWF Season by winning the BWF Most Promising Player of the Year. She won titles at the 2016 BWF Superseries Finals in both the women's and mixed doubles. In 2017, Chen was awarded the BWF Best Female Player of the Year, after entering the Dubai World Superseries Finals as the first seed in both women's and mixed doubles, and also winning women's doubles gold and mixed doubles silver at the 2017 BWF World Championships. In women's doubles, she won gold medals at the 2017, 2021, 2022 and 2023 World Championships, 2018 and 2022 Asian Games, and at the 2019 and 2022 Asian Championships.

== Career ==
In 2023, Chen and Jia Yifan helped the national team reach the final of the Sudirman Cup by winning the deciding rubber, beating fellow former world no. 1 pair Yuki Fukushima and Sayaka Hirota in straight games. The team then ended the tournament by lifting the cup for 13 times. In August, Chen and Jia won the World Championships title by beating Apriyani Rahayu and Siti Fadia Silva Ramadhanti in the final. The duo becoming the first women's doubles to win four golds in the World Championships history. In October, they won the Denmark Open, becoming the first Chinese women's doubles pair to win defend the title.

At the 2024 Summer Olympics, with partner Jia Yifan, Chen won gold in the women's doubles event, defeating compatriots Liu Shengshu and Tan Ning 2–0 in the finals.

== Achievements ==
=== Olympic Games ===
Women's doubles
Year	Venue	Partner	Opponent	Score	Result
2020	Musashino Forest Sport Plaza; Tokyo, Japan	(China) Jia Yifan	(Indonesia) Greysia Polii (Indonesia) Apriyani Rahayu	19–21, 15–21	Silver
2024	Porte de La Chapelle Arena; Paris, France	(China) Jia Yifan	(China) Liu Shengshu (China) Tan Ning	22–20, 21–15	Gold

=== World Championships ===
Women's doubles
Year	Venue	Partner	Opponent	Score	Result
2017	Emirates Arena; Glasgow, Scotland	(China) Jia Yifan	(Japan) Yuki Fukushima (Japan) Sayaka Hirota	21–18, 17–21, 21–15	Gold
2021	Palacio de los Deportes Carolina Marín; Huelva, Spain	(China) Jia Yifan	(South Korea) Lee So-hee (South Korea) Shin Seung-chan	21–16, 21–17	Gold
2022	Tokyo Metropolitan Gymnasium; Tokyo, Japan	(China) Jia Yifan	(South Korea) Kim So-yeong (South Korea) Kong Hee-yong	22–20, 21–14	Gold
2023	Royal Arena; Copenhagen, Denmark	(China) Jia Yifan	(Indonesia) Apriyani Rahayu (Indonesia) Siti Fadia Silva Ramadhanti	21–16, 21–12	Gold

Mixed doubles
Year	Venue	Partner	Opponent	Score	Result
2017	Emirates Arena; Glasgow, Scotland	(China) Zheng Siwei	(Indonesia) Tontowi Ahmad (Indonesia) Liliyana Natsir	21–15, 16–21, 15–21	Silver

=== Asian Games ===
Women's doubles
Year	Venue	Partner	Opponent	Score	Result
2018	Istora Gelora Bung Karno; Jakarta, Indonesia	(China) Jia Yifan	(Japan) Misaki Matsutomo (Japan) Ayaka Takahashi	22–20, 22–20	Gold
2022	Binjiang Gymnasium; Hangzhou, China	(China) Jia Yifan	(South Korea) Baek Ha-na (South Korea) Lee So-hee	21–18, 21–17	Gold

=== Asian Championships ===
Women's doubles
Year	Venue	Partner	Opponent	Score	Result
2019	Wuhan Sports Center Gymnasium; Wuhan, China	(China) Jia Yifan	(Japan) Mayu Matsumoto (Japan) Wakana Nagahara	19–21, 21–14, 21–19	Gold
2022	Muntinlupa Sports Complex; Metro Manila, Philippines	(China) Jia Yifan	(Japan) Rin Iwanaga (Japan) Kie Nakanishi	21–11, 21–15	Gold
2024	Ningbo Olympic Sports Center Gymnasium, Ningbo, China	(China) Jia Yifan	(China) Zhang Shuxian (China) Zheng Yu	14–21, 16–21	Bronze
2025	Ningbo Olympic Sports Center Gymnasium, Ningbo, China	(China) Jia Yifan	(Japan) Nami Matsuyama (Japan) Chiharu Shida	17–21, 10–21	Bronze

=== World Junior Championships ===
Girls' doubles
Year	Venue	Partner	Opponent	Score	Result
2013	Hua Mark Indoor Stadium; Bangkok, Thailand	(China) He Jiaxin	(South Korea) Chae Yoo-jung (South Korea) Kim Ji-won	19–21, 15–21	Silver
2014	Stadium Sultan Abdul Halim; Alor Setar, Malaysia	(China) Jia Yifan	(Indonesia) Rosyita Eka Putri Sari (Indonesia) Apriyani Rahayu	21–11, 21–14	Gold
2015	Centro de Alto Rendimiento de la Videna; Lima, Peru	(China) Jia Yifan	(China) Du Yue (China) Li Yinhui	21–18, 13–21, 21–11	Gold

Mixed doubles
Year	Venue	Partner	Opponent	Score	Result
2012	Chiba Port Arena; Chiba, Japan	(China) Liu Yuchen	(Indonesia) Edi Subaktiar (Indonesia) Melati Daeva Oktavianti	21–14, 18–21, 11–21	Bronze
2013	Hua Mark Indoor Stadium; Bangkok, Thailand	(China) Huang Kaixiang	(Indonesia) Kevin Sanjaya Sukamuljo (Indonesia) Masita Mahmudin	21–18, 20–22, 23–21	Gold
2014	Stadium Sultan Abdul Halim; Alor Setar, Malaysia	(China) Huang Kaixiang	(Indonesia) Muhammad Rian Ardianto (Indonesia) Rosyita Eka Putri Sari	21–12, 21–17	Gold
2015	Centro de Alto Rendimiento de la Videna; Lima, Peru	(China) Zheng Siwei	(China) He Jiting (China) Du Yue	21–19, 21–8	Gold

=== Asian Junior Championships ===
Girls' doubles
Year	Venue	Partner	Opponent	Score	Result
2012	Gimcheon Indoor Stadium; Gimcheon, South Korea	(China) He Jiaxin	(China) Huang Yaqiong (China) Yu Xiaohan	21–23, 10–21	Bronze
2013	Likas Indoor Stadium; Kota Kinabalu, Malaysia	(China) He Jiaxin	(China) Huang Dongping (China) Jia Yifan	19–21, 16–21	Silver
2014	Taipei Gymnasium; Taipei, Taiwan	(China) Jia Yifan	(China) Du Yue (China) Li Yinhui	21–11, 21–18	Gold
2015	CPB Badminton Training Center; Bangkok, Thailand	(China) Jia Yifan	(China) Du Yue (China) Li Yinhui	14–21, 21–18, 18–21	Silver

Mixed doubles
Year	Venue	Partner	Opponent	Score	Result
2012	Gimcheon Indoor Stadium; Gimcheon, South Korea	(China) Liu Yuchen	(South Korea) Choi Sol-gyu (South Korea) Chae Yoo-jung	17–21, 19–21	Bronze
2013	Likas Indoor Stadium; Kota Kinabalu, Malaysia	(China) Huang Kaixiang	(South Korea) Choi Sol-gyu (South Korea) Chae Yoo-jung	21–18, 17–21, 16–21	Bronze
2014	Taipei Gymnasium; Taipei, Taiwan	(China) Huang Kaixiang	(South Korea) Kim Jung-ho (South Korea) Kong Hee-yong	21–14, 21–13	Gold
2015	CPB Badminton Training Center; Bangkok, Thailand	(China) Zheng Siwei	(South Korea) Choi Jong-woo (South Korea) Kim Hye-jeong	21–8, 21–12	Gold

=== BWF World Tour (19 titles, 8 runners-up) ===
The BWF World Tour, which was announced on 19 March 2017 and implemented in 2018, is a series of elite badminton tournaments sanctioned by the Badminton World Federation (BWF). The BWF World Tour is divided into levels of World Tour Finals, Super 1000, Super 750, Super 500, Super 300, and the BWF Tour Super 100.

Women's doubles
Year	Tournament	Level	Partner	Opponent	Score	Result
2018	Malaysia Masters	Super 500	(China) Jia Yifan	(Denmark) Kamilla Rytter Juhl (Denmark) Christinna Pedersen	20–22, 18–21	(silver) Runner-up
2018	Malaysia Open	Super 750	(China) Jia Yifan	(Japan) Misaki Matsutomo (Japan) Ayaka Takahashi	12–21, 12–21	(silver) Runner-up
2018	Japan Open	Super 750	(China) Jia Yifan	(Japan) Yuki Fukushima (Japan) Sayaka Hirota	15–21, 12–21	(silver) Runner-up
2019	All England Open	Super 1000	(China) Jia Yifan	(Japan) Mayu Matsumoto (Japan) Wakana Nagahara	18–21, 22–20, 21–11	(gold) Winner
2019	Malaysia Open	Super 750	(China) Jia Yifan	(China) Du Yue (China) Li Yinhui	21–14, 21–15	(gold) Winner
2019	Australian Open	Super 300	(China) Jia Yifan	(Japan) Yuki Fukushima (Japan) Sayaka Hirota	10–21, 16–21	(silver) Runner-up
2019	China Open	Super 1000	(China) Jia Yifan	(Japan) Misaki Matsutomo (Japan) Ayaka Takahashi	21–14, 21–18	(gold) Winner
2019	Denmark Open	Super 750	(China) Jia Yifan	(South Korea) Baek Ha-na (South Korea) Jung Kyung-eun	21–9, 19–21, 15–21	(silver) Runner-up
2019	Hong Kong Open	Super 500	(China) Jia Yifan	(South Korea) Chang Ye-na (South Korea) Kim Hye-rin	21–11, 13–21, 21–15	(gold) Winner
2019	BWF World Tour Finals	World Tour Finals	(China) Jia Yifan	(Japan) Mayu Matsumoto (Japan) Wakana Nagahara	21–14, 21–10	(gold) Winner
2020	Thailand Masters	Super 300	(China) Jia Yifan	(South Korea) Baek Ha-na (South Korea) Jung Kyung-eun	17–21, 21–17, 21–15	(gold) Winner
2022	German Open	Super 300	(China) Jia Yifan	(Bulgaria) Gabriela Stoeva (Bulgaria) Stefani Stoeva	21–16, 29–30, 21–19	(gold) Winner
2022	Indonesia Masters	Super 500	(China) Jia Yifan	(Indonesia) Apriyani Rahayu (Indonesia) Siti Fadia Silva Ramadhanti	21–18, 21–12	(gold) Winner
2022	Malaysia Masters	Super 500	(China) Jia Yifan	(Japan) Nami Matsuyama (Japan) Chiharu Shida	21–11, 21–12	(gold) Winner
2022	Denmark Open	Super 750	(China) Jia Yifan	(South Korea) Baek Ha-na (South Korea) Lee So-hee	21–12, 21–15	(gold) Winner
2022	BWF World Tour Finals	World Tour Finals	(China) Jia Yifan	(Thailand) Benyapa Aimsaard (Thailand) Nuntakarn Aimsaard	21–13, 21–14	(gold) Winner
2023	Malaysia Open	Super 1000	(China) Jia Yifan	(South Korea) Baek Ha-na (South Korea) Lee Yu-lim	21–16, 21–10	(gold) Winner
2023	India Open	Super 750	(China) Jia Yifan	(Japan) Nami Matsuyama (Japan) Chiharu Shida	Walkover	(silver) Runner-up
2023	Singapore Open	Super 750	(China) Jia Yifan	(South Korea) Baek Ha-na (South Korea) Lee So-hee	21–16, 21–12	(gold) Winner
2023	Korea Open	Super 500	(China) Jia Yifan	(South Korea) Kim So-yeong (South Korea) Kong Hee-yong	21–10, 17–21, 21–7	(gold) Winner
2023	Japan Open	Super 750	(China) Jia Yifan	(South Korea) Kim So-yeong (South Korea) Kong Hee-yong	17–21, 14–21	(silver) Runner-up
2023	China Open	Super 1000	(China) Jia Yifan	(South Korea) Baek Ha-na (South Korea) Lee So-hee	21–11, 21–17	(gold) Winner
2023	Denmark Open	Super 750	(China) Jia Yifan	(Japan) Nami Matsuyama (Japan) Chiharu Shida	21–16, 21–13	(gold) Winner
2023	BWF World Tour Finals	World Tour Finals	(China) Jia Yifan	(South Korea) Baek Ha-na (South Korea) Lee So-hee	21–16, 21–16	(gold) Winner
2024	French Open	Super 750	(China) Jia Yifan	(Japan) Nami Matsuyama (Japan) Chiharu Shida	21–12, 19–21, 24–22	(gold) Winner
2024	Singapore Open	Super 750	(China) Jia Yifan	(Japan) Nami Matsuyama (Japan) Chiharu Shida	21–15, 21–12	(gold) Winner
2024	Indonesia Open	Super 1000	(China) Jia Yifan	(South Korea) Baek Ha-na (South Korea) Lee So-hee	17–21, 13–21	(silver) Runner-up

=== BWF Superseries (12 titles, 7 runners-up) ===
The BWF Superseries, which was launched on 14 December 2006 and implemented in 2007, was a series of elite badminton tournaments, sanctioned by the Badminton World Federation (BWF). BWF Superseries levels were Superseries and Superseries Premier. A season of Superseries consisted of twelve tournaments around the world that had been introduced since 2011. Successful players were invited to the Superseries Finals, which were held at the end of each year.

Women's doubles
Year	Tournament	Partner	Opponent	Score	Result
2016	Australian Open	(China) Bao Yixin	(Indonesia) Nitya Krishinda Maheswari (Indonesia) Greysia Polii	23–21, 21–17	(gold) Winner
2016	French Open	(China) Jia Yifan	(South Korea) Chang Ye-na (South Korea) Lee So-hee	21–16, 21–17	(gold) Winner
2016	Dubai World Superseries Finals	(China) Jia Yifan	(Japan) Misaki Matsutomo (Japan) Ayaka Takahashi	21–15, 13–21, 21–17	(gold) Winner
2017	Indonesia Open	(China) Jia Yifan	(South Korea) Chang Ye-na (South Korea) Lee So-hee	21–19, 15–21, 21–10	(gold) Winner
2017	China Open	(China) Jia Yifan	(South Korea) Kim Hye-rin (South Korea) Lee So-hee	21–7, 18–21, 21–14	(gold) Winner
2017	Hong Kong Open	(China) Jia Yifan	(Indonesia) Greysia Polii (Indonesia) Apriyani Rahayu	14–21, 21–16, 21–15	(gold) Winner

Mixed doubles
Year	Tournament	Partner	Opponent	Score	Result
2016	Australian Open	(China) Zheng Siwei	(China) Lu Kai (China) Huang Yaqiong	18–21, 14–21	(silver) Runner-up
2016	Japan Open	(China) Zheng Siwei	(South Korea) Ko Sung-hyun (South Korea) Kim Ha-na	21–10, 21–15	(gold) Winner
2016	Korea Open	(China) Zheng Siwei	(South Korea) Ko Sung-hyun (South Korea) Kim Ha-na	14–21, 19–21	(silver) Runner-up
2016	Denmark Open	(China) Zheng Siwei	(Denmark) Joachim Fischer Nielsen (Denmark) Christinna Pedersen	16–21, 20–22	(silver) Runner-up
2016	French Open	(China) Zheng Siwei	(South Korea) Ko Sung-hyun (South Korea) Kim Ha-na	21–16, 21–15	(gold) Winner
2016	Dubai World Superseries Finals	(China) Zheng Siwei	(England) Chris Adcock (England) Gabby Adcock	21–12, 21–12	(gold) Winner
2017	India Open	(China) Zheng Siwei	(China) Lu Kai (China) Huang Yaqiong	24–22, 14–21, 17–21	(silver) Runner-up
2017	Malaysia Open	(China) Zheng Siwei	(China) Lu Kai (China) Huang Yaqiong	21–15, 21–18	(gold) Winner
2017	Indonesia Open	(China) Zheng Siwei	(Indonesia) Tontowi Ahmad (Indonesia) Liliyana Natsir	20–22, 15–21	(silver) Runner-up
2017	Australian Open	(China) Zheng Siwei	(Indonesia) Praveen Jordan (Indonesia) Debby Susanto	18–21, 21–14, 21–17	(gold) Winner
2017	Denmark Open	(China) Zheng Siwei	(Hong Kong) Tang Chun Man (Hong Kong) Tse Ying Suet	22–24, 21–19, 21–23	(silver) Runner-up
2017	French Open	(China) Zheng Siwei	(Indonesia) Tontowi Ahmad (Indonesia) Liliyana Natsir	20–22, 15–21	(silver) Runner-up
2017	Dubai World Superseries Finals	(China) Zheng Siwei	(Hong Kong) Tang Chun Man (Hong Kong) Tse Ying Suet	21–15, 22–20	(gold) Winner

BWF Super Series Finals tournament
BWF Super Series Premier tournament
BWF Super Series tournament

=== BWF Grand Prix (13 titles, 3 runners-up) ===
The BWF Grand Prix had two levels, the Grand Prix and Grand Prix Gold. It was a series of badminton tournaments sanctioned by the Badminton World Federation (BWF) and played between 2007 and 2017.

Women's doubles
Year	Tournament	Partner	Opponent	Score	Result
2014	India Grand Prix Gold	(China) Jia Yifan	(China) Huang Yaqiong (China) Yu Xiaohan	22–24, 21–19, 21–11	(gold) Winner
2015	Brasil Open	(China) Jia Yifan	(Netherlands) Eefje Muskens (Netherlands) Selena Piek	21–17, 21–14	(gold) Winner
2016	China Masters	(China) Jia Yifan	(China) Luo Ying (China) Luo Yu	21–16, 15–21, 18–21	(silver) Runner-up
2016	Bitburger Open	(China) Jia Yifan	(Thailand) Jongkolphan Kititharakul (Thailand) Rawinda Prajongjai	21–12, 21–19	(gold) Winner
2016	Macau Open	(China) Jia Yifan	(Indonesia) Anggia Shitta Awanda (Indonesia) Ni Ketut Mahadewi Istarani	21–15, 21–13	(gold) Winner
2017	Thailand Masters	(China) Jia Yifan	(Thailand) Puttita Supajirakul (Thailand) Sapsiree Taerattanachai	21–16, 21–15	(gold) Winner
2017	Swiss Open	(China) Jia Yifan	(Bulgaria) Gabriela Stoeva (Bulgaria) Stefani Stoeva	21–16, 21–15	(gold) Winner

Mixed doubles
Year	Tournament	Partner	Opponent	Score	Result
2014	India Grand Prix Gold	(China) Huang Kaixiang	(China) Wang Yilyu (China) Yu Xiaohan	18–21, 14–21	(silver) Runner-up
2014	Bitburger Open	(China) Zheng Siwei	(Indonesia) Alfian Eko Prasetya (Indonesia) Annisa Saufika	21–11, 21–13	(gold) Winner
2015	New Zealand Open	(China) Zheng Siwei	(China) Yu Xiaoyu (China) Xia Huan	21–14, 21–8	(gold) Winner
2015	Brasil Open	(China) Zheng Siwei	(Russia) Evgenij Dremin (Russia) Evgenia Dimova	21–12, 21–10	(gold) Winner
2016	Thailand Masters	(China) Zheng Siwei	(Malaysia) Chan Peng Soon (Malaysia) Goh Liu Ying	21–17, 21–15	(gold) Winner
2016	Swiss Open	(China) Wang Yilyu	(Thailand) Bodin Isara (Thailand) Savitree Amitrapai	19–21, 21–16, 21–15	(gold) Winner
2016	China Masters	(China) Zheng Siwei	(China) Xu Chen (China) Ma Jin	17–21, 15–21	(silver) Runner-up
2016	Chinese Taipei Open	(China) Zheng Siwei	(Malaysia) Tan Kian Meng (Malaysia) Lai Pei Jing	21–13, 21–16	(gold) Winner
2016	Bitburger Open	(China) Zheng Siwei	(England) Chris Adcock (England) Gabby Adcock	21–16, 23–21	(gold) Winner

BWF Grand Prix Gold tournament
BWF Grand Prix tournament

=== BWF International Challenge/Series (3 titles) ===
Women's doubles
Year	Tournament	Partner	Opponent	Score	Result
2015	Osaka International	(China) Jia Yifan	(Japan) Yuki Fukushima (Japan) Sayaka Hirota	21–17, 21–15	(gold) Winner
2016	China International	(China) Jia Yifan	(China) Hu Yuxiang (China) Xu Ya	21–8, 21–10	(gold) Winner

Mixed doubles
Year	Tournament	Partner	Opponent	Score	Result
2015	China International	(China) Zheng Siwei	(China) Liu Yuchen (China) Yu Xiaohan	15–21, 21–12, 21–13	(gold) Winner

BWF International Challenge tournament

== Performance timeline ==
Key

W	Won	F	Finalist	SF	Semi-finalist
QF	Quarter-finalist	#R	Rounds 4, 3, 2, 1	RR	Round-robin stage
Q#	Qualification round	A	Absent	w/d	Withdrew
G	Gold	S	Silver	B	Bronze
NH	Not held	N/A	Not applicable	DNQ	Did not qualify

=== National team ===
- Junior level

Team events	2012	2013	2014	2015
Asian Junior Championships	S	G	G	G
World Junior Championships	G	B	G	G

- Senior level

Team event	2013
East Asian Games	G

Team Event	2016	2017	2018	2019	2020	2021	2022	2023	2024	2025	Ref
Asia Mixed Team Championships	NH	B	NH	A	NH			A	NH	S	
Asian Games	NH		S	NH			S	NH			
Uber Cup	G	NH	B	NH	G	NH	S	NH	G	NH	
Sudirman Cup	NH	S	NH	G	NH	G	NH	G	NH	G	

=== Individual competitions ===
==== Junior level ====
Girls' doubles

Events	2012	2013	2014	2015
Asian Junior Championships	B	S	G	S
World Junior Championships	QF	S	G	G

Mixed doubles

Events	2012	2013	2014	2015
Asian Junior Championships	B	B	G	G
World Junior Championships	B	G	G	G

==== Senior level ====
===== Women's doubles =====
Events	2016	2017	2018	2019	2020	2021	2022	2023	2024	2025
Asian Championships	2R	QF	2R	G	NH		G	QF	B	B
Asian Games	NH		G	NH			G	NH		
World Championships	NH	G	QF	QF	NH	G	G	G	NH	A
Olympic Games	DNQ	NH			S	NH			G	NH

Tournament	BWF Superseries / Grand Prix						BWF World Tour								Best
Tournament	2012	2013	2014	2015	2016	2017	2018	2019	2020	2021	2022	2023	2024	2025	Best
Malaysia Open	A				QF	QF	F	W	NH		QF	W	QF	A	W ('19, '23)
India Open	A				QF	A			NH		A	F	w/d	A	F ('23)
Indonesia Masters	SF	QF	A			NH	2R	QF	2R	A	W	A			W ('22)
Thailand Masters	NH				QF	W	A		W	NH		A			W ('17, '20)
German Open	A				QF	A	QF	QF	NH		W	A		2R	W ('22)
Orléans Masters	NA						A		NH	A				1R	1R ('25)
All England Open	A				2R	1R	QF	W	QF	A	1R	QF	2R	A	W ('19)
Swiss Open	A				QF	W	A	QF	NH	A	w/d	A			W ('17)
Chinese Taipei Open	A				SF	A			NH		A				SF ('16)
Thailand Open	A		NH	SF	A					NH	QF	A		QF	SF ('15)
Malaysia Masters	A						F	A	2R	NH	W	A		1R	W ('22)
Singapore Open	A				QF	QF	A		NH		w/d	W	W	A	W ('23, '24)
Indonesia Open	A					W	SF	SF	NH	A	QF	QF	F	A	W ('17)
Japan Open	A				w/d	1R	F	2R	NH		SF	F	w/d	A	F ('18, '23)
China Open	A		1R	A	1R	W	QF	W	NH			W	A		W ('17, '19, '23)
Macau Open	A				W	A			NH				A	1R	W ('16)
Hong Kong Open	A				SF	W	1R	W	NH			A		1R	W ('17, '19)
China Masters	NA		A	SF	F	A	2R	SF	NH			SF	A		F ('16)
Korea Open	A				w/d	A		QF	NH		A	W	A	QF	W ('23)
Denmark Open	A				1R	2R	2R	F	A	1R	W	W	A	SF	W ('22, '23)
French Open	A				W	SF	1R	QF	NH	A	QF	2R	W	SF	W ('16, '24)
Hylo Open	A		2R	A	W	A									W ('16)
Japan Masters	NH											1R	A		1R ('23)
Australian Open	A	SF	A		W	SF	A	F	NH		A				W ('16)
Syed Modi International	A	NH	W	A					NH		A				W ('14)
BWF Superseries / Tour Finals	DNQ				W	RR	RR	W	DNQ		W	W	SF	DNQ	W ('16, '19, '22, '23)
Brasil Open	NH		A	W	A	NH									W ('15)
New Zealand Open	NH	2R	A	2R	A				NH						2R ('13, '15)
Year-end ranking	160	140	98	52	6	1	5	1	1	1	1	1	4		1
Tournament	2012	2013	2014	2015	2016	2017	2018	2019	2020	2021	2022	2023	2024	2025	Best

===== Mixed doubles =====
Events	2017
Asian Championships	QF
World Championships	S

Tournament	BWF Superseries / Grand Prix						Best
Tournament	2012	2013	2014	2015	2016	2017	Best
Thailand Masters	NH				W	A	W ('16)
Swiss Open	A				W	SF	W ('16)
All England Open	A					2R	2R ('17)
New Zealand Open	NH	2R	A	W	A		W ('15)
Australian Open	A	SF	A		F	W	W ('17)
India Open	A				QF	F	F ('17)
Malaysia Open	A				1R	W	W ('17)
Singapore Open	A				SF	w/d	SF ('16)
Thailand Open	A		NH	2R	A		2R ('15)
Korea Open	A				F	w/d	F ('16)
Chinese Taipei Open	A				W	A	W ('16)
China Open	A		SF	A	QF	A	SF ('14)
Japan Open	A				W	A	W ('16)
Syed Modi International	A	NH	F	A			F ('14)
Denmark Open	A				F	F	F ('16, '17)
French Open	A				W	F	W ('16)
Hylo Open	A		W	A	W	A	W ('14, '16)
Macau Open	A	SF	A		w/d	A	SF ('13)
China Masters	A			2R	F	A	F ('16)
Hong Kong Open	A				2R	A	2R ('16)
Indonesia Masters	1R	SF	A			NH	SF ('13)
Indonesia Open	A				1R	F	F ('17)
Brasil Open	NH		A	W	A	NH	W ('15)
BWF Superseries Finals	DNQ				W	W	W ('16, '17)
Year-end ranking	464	67	83	50	1	1	1
Tournament	2012	2013	2014	2015	2016	2017	Best
