= Li Yun (badminton) =

Chinese badminton player (born 1997)

Li Yun 李云
Personal information
- Born: 15 January 1997 (age 29) Jiangxi, China

Sport
- Country: China
- Sport: Badminton

Women's singles
- Highest ranking: 54 (5 November 2019)
- Current ranking: 148 (13 September 2019)
- BWF profile
Medal record
Women's badminton
Representing China
World Junior Championships
Gold medal – first place	2015 Lima	Mixed team

Li Yun (Chinese: 李云, born 15 January 1997) is a Chinese badminton player. She took part at the 2015 World Junior Championships, and helped the team clinch the Suhandinata Cup. Li was the women's singles runner-up at the 2015 Brasil Open Grand Prix, and won her first BWF World Tour title in 2019 SaarLorLux Open.

== Achievements ==
=== BWF World Tour (1 title) ===
The BWF World Tour, which was announced on 19 March 2017 and implemented in 2018, is a series of elite badminton tournaments sanctioned by the Badminton World Federation (BWF). The BWF World Tour is divided into levels of World Tour Finals, Super 1000, Super 750, Super 500, Super 300, and the BWF Tour Super 100.

Women's singles
Year	Tournament	Level	Opponent	Score	Result
2019	SaarLorLux Open	Super 100	(Denmark) Line Christophersen	21–12, 21–13	(gold) Winner

=== BWF Grand Prix (1 runner-up) ===
The BWF Grand Prix had two levels, the BWF Grand Prix and Grand Prix Gold. It was a series of badminton tournaments sanctioned by the Badminton World Federation (BWF) held from 2007 to 2017.

Women's singles
Year	Tournament	Opponent	Score	Result
2015	Brasil Open	(China) Shen Yaying	22–20, 17–21, 22–24	(silver) Runner-up

BWF Grand Prix Gold tournament
BWF Grand Prix tournament

=== BWF International Challenge/Series (1 runner-up) ===
Women's singles
Year	Tournament	Opponent	Score	Result
2018	Turkey International	(Turkey) Özge Bayrak	19–21, 21–12, 17–21	(silver) Runner-up

BWF International Challenge tournament
BWF International Series tournament
BWF Future Series tournament
