= Edwin Ekiring =

Ugandan badminton player

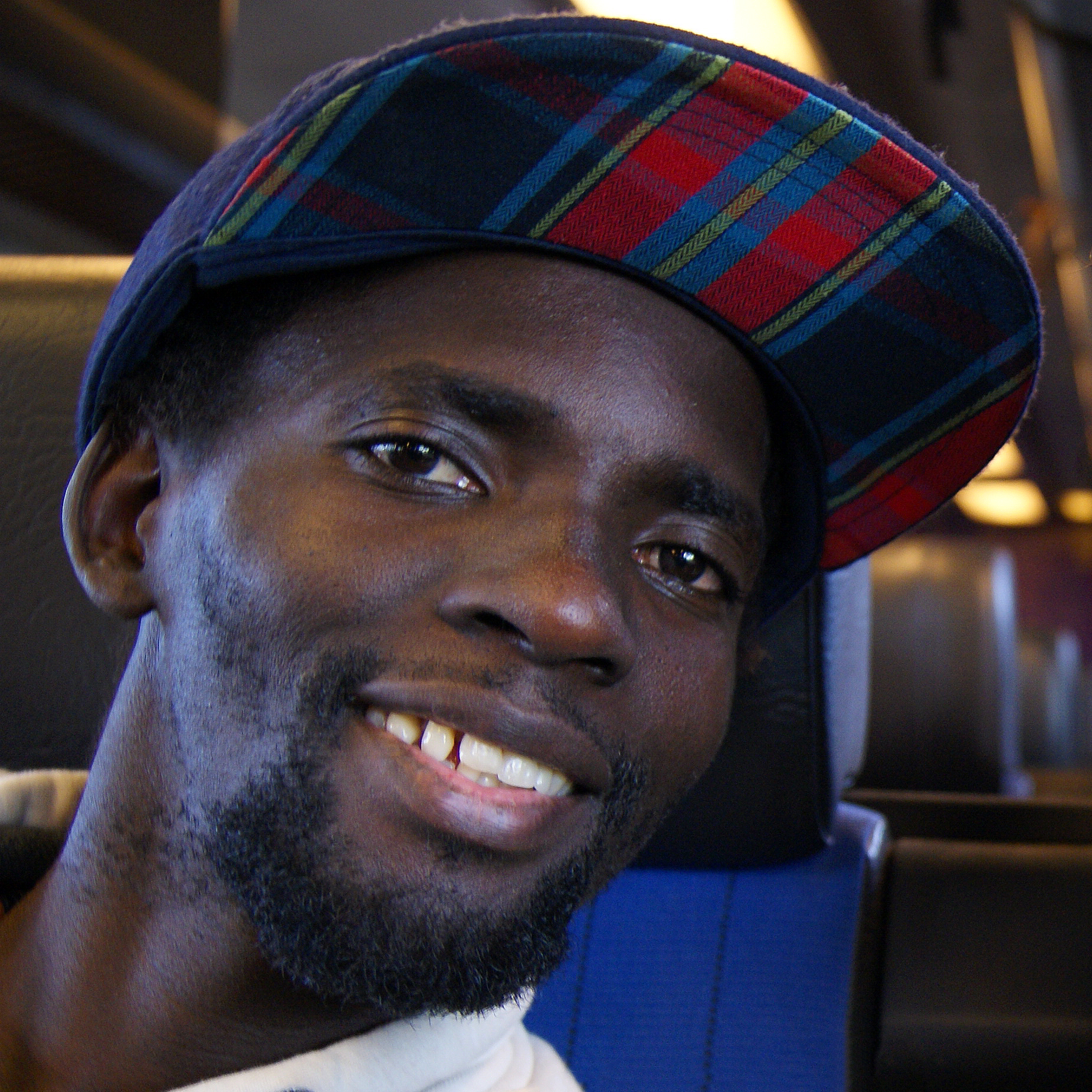

Personal information
- Nickname: Eki
- Born: 22 December 1986 (age 39) Nsambya, Uganda
- Years active: 2006–
- Height: 1.83 m (6 ft 0 in)
- Weight: 75 kg (165 lb)

Sport
- Country: Uganda
- Sport: Badminton
- Handedness: Right

Men's singles
- Highest ranking: 76 (26 November 2015)
- BWF profile
Medal record
Men's badminton
Representing Uganda
All-Africa Games
| Silver medal – second place | 2011 Maputo | Men's singles |
| Bronze medal – third place | 2007 Algiers | Men's singles |
| Bronze medal – third place | 2015 Brazzaville | Men's singles |
African Championships
| Bronze medal – third place | 2007 Rose Hill | Men's singles |
| Bronze medal – third place | 2011 Marrakesh | Men's singles |

Edwin Ekiring (born 22 December 1986) is a Ugandan badminton player, nicknamed "The Black Pearl". He is 1.83 metres (6 ft 0 in) tall and weighs 75 kilograms (165 lb).

== Career ==
At the 2006 Commonwealth Games in Melbourne, Australia, Ekiring competed in the men's singles as well as the mixed team event. In the singles he was defeated in the first round, 17–21, 17–21 by Sri Lankan Dinuka Karunaratne. In pool B of the mixed team event he won singles matches in fixtures against Jamaica and Kenya but lost matches to players from Australia and New Zealand. Playing with Abraham Wogute, he lost team doubles matches against Jamaica, Australia and New Zealand but beat the pair from Kenya as Uganda were eliminated from the competition at the pool stage. Ekiring then represented Uganda at the 2007 All-Africa Games and achieved bronze, the country's first medal in badminton in the history of the games.

Ekiring competed at the 2008 Summer Olympics in Beijing, China, after being given a wildcard into the men's singles by the Badminton World Federation. He was the first badminton player to represent Uganda at the Olympics. He received a bye into the second round of the competition before losing 5–21, 8–21 to Park Sung-hwan of South Korea.

In 2009, Ekiring was involved in a serious road accident while cycling home from training in the Netherlands that left him with a fractured arm, ribs, ankle and right knee and doctors writing off his chances of ever playing sport again. The 28-year-old spiralled into a deep depression and feared he may never play badminton again but remarkably just eight months later he was back on court.

At the 2010 Commonwealth Games in Delhi, India, Ekiring reached the round of 16 in the men's singles event; he beat Sharafuddin Nasheeu of Maldives in the first round before losing two games to nil to Ashton Chen of Singapore. In the men's doubles he competed with Abraham Wogute; the Ugandan duo beat a team from Seychelles in the first round before being eliminated by a pair from Singapore in the round of 16.

In 2012, Ekiring made it to the quarterfinals of the U.S. Open. He beat Chetan Anand 21–16, 21–12 in the round of 16 before losing to number one seed Takuma Ueda from Japan 13–21, 12–21.

Ekiring was selected to compete for Uganda at the 2012 Summer Olympics in the men's singles after qualifying based on his world ranking. He did not make it past the group stages. At the 2014 Commonwealth Games, he reached the second round, where he was defeated by R. V. Gurusaidutt, the eventual bronze medal winner. He also took part in the men's doubles and mixed team events.

He was one of the 14 players selected for the Road to Rio Program, a program that aimed to help African badminton players to compete at the 2016 Olympic Games.

He competed at the 2018 Commonwealth Games in Gold Coast.

== Badminton experience ==
- 2-Olympic Games 2008 Beijing, China and 2012 London, United Kingdom
- 2004–2008 Olympic Training Centre in Saarbrucken, Germany.
- 2007–2008 Luxembourg
- 2008–2009 Velo-Wateringen, The Hague, The Netherlands.
- 2009–2012 BC Amersfoort, Amersfoort, the Netherlands, Eredivisie.
- 2012–2013 Solingen, Germany, 2nd Bundesliga
- 2013–2017 BC Amersfoort, Amersfoort, the Netherlands, Eredivisie.

== Achievements ==
=== All-Africa Games ===
Men's singles
| Year | Venue | Opponent | Score | Result |
|---|---|---|---|---|
| 2007 | Salle OMS El Biar, Algiers, Algeria | (Zambia) Eli Mambwe | | Bronze |
| 2011 | Escola Josina Machel, Maputo, Mozambique | (South Africa) Jacob Maliekal | 15–21, 14–21 | Silver |
| 2015 | Gymnase Étienne Mongha, Brazzaville, Republic of the Congo | (South Africa) Prakash Vijayanath | 15–21, 20–22 | Bronze |

=== African Championships ===
Men's singles
| Year | Venue | Opponent | Score | Result |
|---|---|---|---|---|
| 2007 | Stadium Badminton Rose Hill, Rose Hill, Mauritius | (Algeria) Nabil Lasmari | 12–21, 17–21 | Bronze |
| 2011 | Salle Couverte Zerktouni, Marrakesh, Morocco | (Nigeria) Jinkam Ifraimu | 19–21, 20–22 | Bronze |

=== BWF International Challenge/Series (7 titles, 7 runners-up) ===
Men's singles
| Year | Tournament | Opponent | Score | Result |
|---|---|---|---|---|
| 2006 | Kenya International | (Wales) Richard Vaughan | 16–21, 17–21 | (silver) Runner-up |
| 2008 | Mauritius International | (Spain) Carlos Longo | 21–15, 15–21, 21–8 | (gold) Winner |
| 2011 | Botswana International | (Israel) Misha Zilberman | 10–21, 21–16, 22–20 | (gold) Winner |
| 2011 | South Africa International | (Portugal) Pedro Martins | 15–21, 18–21 | (silver) Runner-up |
| 2014 | Nigeria International | (France) Arnaud Génin | 11–4, 11–7, 4–11, 11–9 | (gold) Winner |
| 2014 | Zambia International | (Slovenia) Alen Roj | 21–18, 21–8 | (gold) Winner |
| 2014 | South Africa International | (Austria) Luka Wraber | 21–16, 17–21, 15–21 | (silver) Runner-up |
| 2015 | Uganda International | (South Africa) Jacob Maliekal | 8–21, 21–18, 10–21 | (silver) Runner-up |
| 2015 | Egypt International | (Slovenia) Alen Roj | 20–22, 25–23, 21–18 | (gold) Winner |
| 2015 | Morocco International | (Portugal) Pedro Martins | 14–21, 12–21 | (silver) Runner-up |
| 2016 | Ivory Coast International | (Nigeria) Gideon Babalola | 21–13, 12–21, 21–10 | (gold) Winner |
| 2017 | Uganda International | (Mauritius) Julien Paul | 19–21, 11–7 (retired) | (silver) Runner-up |

Men's doubles
| Year | Tournament | Partner | Opponent | Score | Result |
|---|---|---|---|---|---|
| 2006 | Kenya International | (Uganda) Abraham Wogute | (Kenya) Himesh Patel (Kenya) Patrick Ruto | 21–8, 21–15 | (gold) Winner |
| 2015 | Uganda International | (Czech Republic) Milan Ludík | (Czech Republic) Pavel Florián (Czech Republic) Ondřej Kopřiva | 11–7, 5–11, 11–10, 6–11, 8–11 | (silver) Runner-up |

BWF International Challenge tournament
BWF International Series tournament
BWF Future Series tournament
