= Jan Fröhlich =

Czech badminton player (born 1980)

Personal information
- Born: 15 March 1980 (age 46) Mladá Boleslav, Czechoslovakia
- Height: 1.85 m (6 ft 1 in)
- Weight: 81 kg (179 lb)

Sport
- Country: Czech Republic (–2022); Switzerland (2023–present)
- Sport: Badminton
- Handedness: Right

Men's singles
- Highest ranking: 36 (October 2006)
- BWF profile

Jan Fröhlich (born 15 March 1980) is a Czech badminton player. He now works as a badminton coach at BC Olympica Brig, Switzerland, and also competes in international senior tournaments representing Switzerland.

== Career ==
He won the men's singles title at the Czech National Badminton Championships ten times from 1998 to 2006 back to back and in 2012, also in the men's doubles event in 2000, 2001, and 2005. Fröhlich played the 2007 BWF World Championships in men's singles, and was defeated in the first round by Chan Yan Kit, of Hong Kong, 21–15, 21–9. In 2005 he won the Kenya International.

== Achievements ==
=== BWF International Challenge/Series ===
Men's singles
Year	Tournament	Opponent	Score	Result
2002	Iceland International	(Canada) Bobby Milroy	13–15, 2–15	(silver) Runner-up
2006	Slovak International	(Denmark) Kasper Ipsen	21–12, 19–21, 21–18	(gold) Winner
2007	Bulgarian International	(Guatemala) Kevin Cordón	21–13, 17–7 retired	(gold) Winner
2009	Mauritius International	(France) Maxime Mora	Walkover	(gold) Winner
2011	Uganda International	(Iran) Kaveh Mehrabi	21–15, 12–1 retired	(gold) Winner
2012	Ethiopia International	(Ethiopia) Asnake Getachew Sahilu	21–10, 21–4	(gold) Winner
2013	Giraldilla International	(Cuba) Osleni Guerrero	19–21, 3–21	(silver) Runner-up
2013	Hellas International	(Malaysia) Misbun Ramdan Mohmed Misbun	14–21, 13–21	(silver) Runner-up
2013	Mercosul International	(Israel) Misha Zilberman	21–15, 21–16	(gold) Winner
2013	Argentina International	(France) Arnaud Génin	21–18, 19–21, 17–21	(silver) Runner-up
2013	Suriname International	(Cuba) Osleni Guerrero	11–21, 18–21	(silver) Runner-up
2014	Giraldilla International	(United States) Bjorn Seguin	21–9, 21–6	(gold) Winner
2014	Suriname International	(Cuba) Osleni Guerrero	7–21 retired	(silver) Runner-up
2016	Chile International	(Cuba) Osleni Guerrero	21–14, 8–21, 14–21	(silver) Runner-up

Men's doubles
Year	Tournament	Partner	Opponent	Score	Result
2005	Kenya International	(Czech Republic) Jan Vondra	(South Africa) Chris Dednam (South Africa) Roelof Dednam	15–11, 15–4	(gold) Winner
2013	Giraldilla International	(Czech Republic) Zdeněk Sváta	(Dominican Republic) Nelson Javier (Dominican Republic) Freddy López	21–8, 21–14	(gold) Winner
2013	Mercosul International	(Czech Republic) Zdeněk Sváta	(Brazil) Hugo Arthuso (Brazil) Alex Yuwan Tjong	20–22, 15–21	(silver) Runner-up
2015	Puerto Rico International	(Slovakia) Matej Hliničan	(Mexico) Job Castillo (Mexico) Lino Muñoz	19–21, 20–22	(silver) Runner-up

Mixed doubles
Year	Tournament	Partner	Opponent	Score	Result
2005	Slovak International	(Czech Republic) Hana Milisová	(Poland) Adam Cwalina (Poland) Małgorzata Kurdelska	15–4, 15–1	(gold) Winner
2013	Hatzor International	(Russia) Katerina Zvereva	(Russia) Vladimir Malkov (Russia) Viktoriia Vorobeva	19–21, 7–21	(silver) Runner-up

BWF International Challenge tournament
BWF International Series tournament
BWF Future Series tournament
