= Ondřej Kopřiva =

Czech badminton player (born 1988)

Personal information
- Born: 24 May 1988 (age 38)

Sport
- Country: Czech Republic
- Sport: Badminton
- Handedness: Right
- Coached by: Pavel Maňásek

Men's singles & doubles
- Highest ranking: 200 (MS 16 May 2013); 61 (MD 24 June 2010); 109 (XD 18 February 2015)
- BWF profile

Ondřej Kopřiva (born 24 May 1988) is a Czech badminton player. Together with his brother, Tomáš Kopřiva, they won the 2009 Slovak Open, and finished runner-up in the 2008 Slovenian International. The duo then participated at the 2010 BWF World Championships. He also partnered with Pavel Florián, and won the 2015 Uganda International.

== Achievements ==
=== BWF International Challenge/Series ===
Men's doubles
Year	Tournament	Partner	Opponent	Score	Result	Ref.
2008	Slovenian International	(Czech Republic) Tomáš Kopřiva	(Austria) Michael Lahnsteiner (Austria) Peter Zauner	17–21, 12–21	(silver) Runner-up	
2009	Slovak Open	(Czech Republic) Tomáš Kopřiva	(Denmark) Søren Gravholt (Denmark) Christian Westergaard Nielsen	21–18, 21–12	(gold) Winner	
2015	Uganda International	(Czech Republic) Pavel Florián	(Uganda) Edwin Ekiring (Czech Republic) Milan Ludík	7–11, 11–5, 10–11, 11–6, 11–8	(gold) Winner	

BWF International Challenge tournament
BWF International Series tournament
BWF Future Series tournament
