= Pavel Florián =

Czech badminton player (born 1987)

Personal information
- Born: 27 April 1987 (age 39)
- Height: 1.90 m (6 ft 3 in)
- Weight: 90 kg (198 lb)

Sport
- Country: Czech Republic
- Sport: Badminton
- Coached by: Radek Votava

Men's singles & doubles
- Highest ranking: 117 (MS 21 January 2010); 96 (MD 26 September 2013); 265 (XD 15 October 2009)
- BWF profile

Pavel Florián (born 27 April 1987) is a Czech badminton player. He won the men's doubles title at the 2015 Uganda International, and also finished runners-up in the 2006 Lithuanian International in the men's doubles and 2008 Slovenian International in the men's singles.

== Achievements ==
=== BWF International Challenge/Series ===
Men's singles
Year	Tournament	Opponent	Score	Result	Ref.
2008	Slovenian International	(Czech Republic) Jan Vondra	18–21, 21–23	(silver) Runner-up	

Men's doubles
Year	Tournament	Partner	Opponent	Score	Result	Ref.
2006	Lithuanian International	(Czech Republic) Stanislav Kohoutek	(Poland) Adam Cwalina (Poland) Wojciech Szkudlarczyk	24–26, 9–21	(silver) Runner-up	
2015	Uganda International	(Czech Republic) Ondřej Kopřiva	(Uganda) Edwin Ekiring (Czech Republic) Milan Ludík	7–11, 11–5, 10–11, 11–6, 11–8	(gold) Winner	

BWF International Challenge tournament
BWF International Series tournament
BWF Future Series tournament
