= Tomasz Mendrek =

Czech badminton player (born 1968)

Personal information
- Born: 9 August 1968 (age 57) Český Těšín, Czechoslovakia (now Czech Republic)
- Years active: 1985–1996
- Height: 1.76 m (5 ft 9 in)

Sport
- Country: Czech Republic
- Sport: Badminton
- Handedness: Right
- Career record: 67 wins, 59 losses
- Highest ranking: 36 (1993)
- BWF profile

Tomasz Mendrek (born 9 August 1968) is a former Czech badminton player and coach. He represented Czechoslovakia in badminton at the 1992 Summer Olympics. He is a 7-time national champion in men's doubles. Mendrek was the national junior coach of the Austrian national team from 2000 to 2005.

Mendrek also served as the junior coach of the Czech Republic national team in 2007.

== Career ==
In 1986, Mendrek won his first national championships title in men's doubles with Miroslav Šrámek. He also won the national men's singles title three consecutive times in 1990, 1991 and 1992.

In 1989, Mendrek won the Czechoslovakian International after defeating Heinz Fischer in the final. In 1990, he failed to defend his title after losing to Thomas Stuer-Lauridsen of Denmark in the final. In 1991, he won the Cyprus International.

In 1992, he won two titles in men's singles, the two being the Malta International and the Czechoslovakian International. He also competed in the men's singles event at the 1992 Summer Olympics. He lost in the second round to Foo Kok Keong of Malaysia.

== Personal life ==
Mendrek has two sons, Jakub Mendrek and Adam Mendrek who is also a badminton player and has represented the Czech Republic in major tournaments.

== Achievements ==
=== IBF International ===
Men's singles

Year	Tournament	Opponent	Score	Result
1989	Czechoslovakian International	(Austria) Heinz Fischer	15–17, 15–1, 15–10	(gold) Winner
1990	Czechoslovakian International	(Denmark) Thomas Stuer-Lauridsen	2–15, 5–15	(silver) Runner-up
1991	Cyprus International	(Bulgaria) Anatoliy Skripko	15–4, 15–8	(gold) Winner
1992	Malta International	(Austria) Hannes Fuchs	16–18, 15–11, 15–5	(gold) Winner
1992	Czechoslovakian International	(Finland) Lasse Lindelof	15–6, 15–6	(gold) Winner
