= Eva Lacinová =

Czech badminton player

Personal information
- Nationality: Czech
- Born: 3 October 1971 (age 53); Prague

Sport
- Sport: Badminton

Eva Lacinová (born 3 October 1971) is a Czech badminton player, born in Prague. She competed in women's singles at the 1992 Summer Olympics in Barcelona.
