= Petr Koukal (badminton) =

Czech badminton player (born 1985)

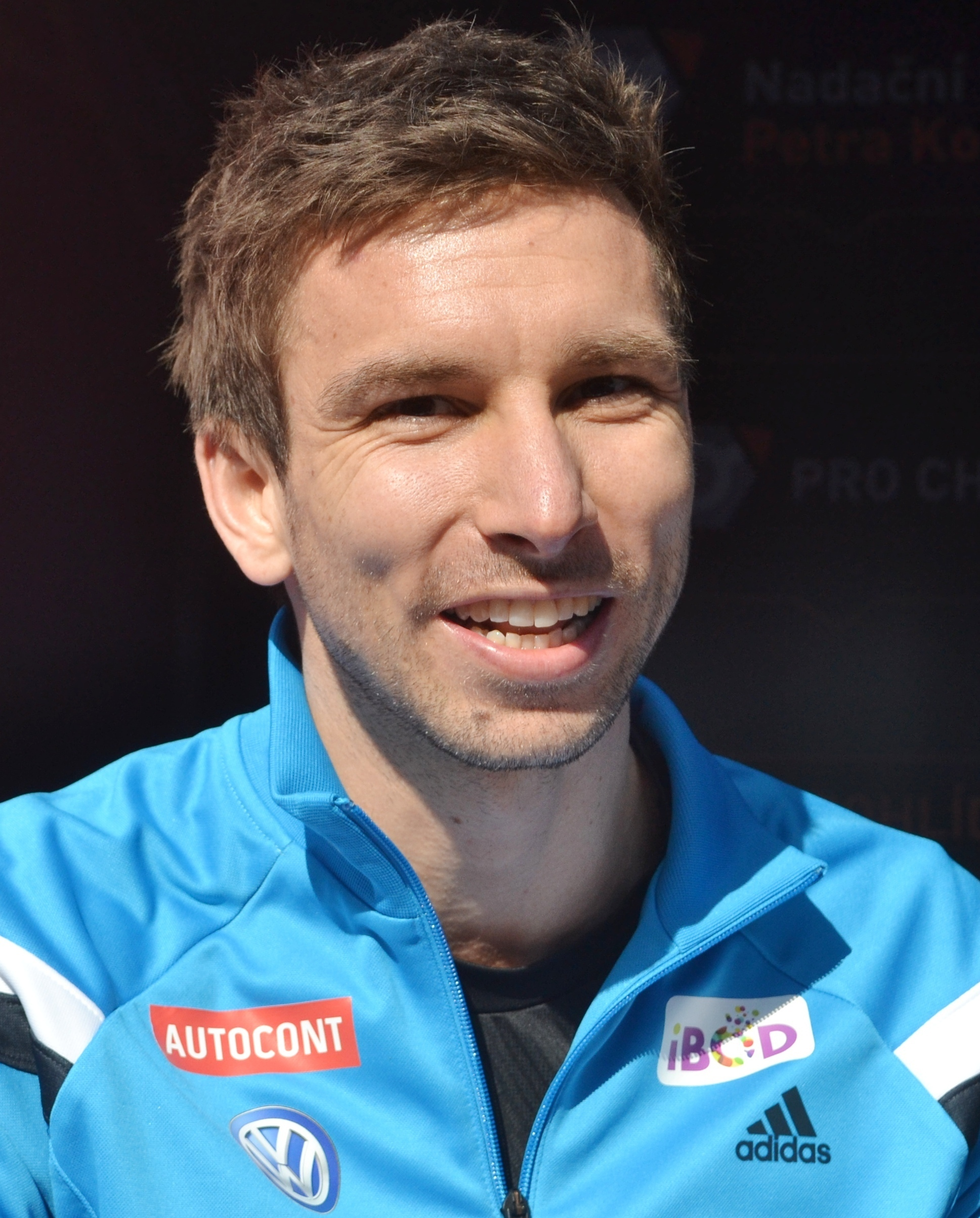

Personal information
- Born: 14 December 1985 (age 40) Hořovice, Czech Republic
- Height: 1.92 m (6 ft 4 in)
- Weight: 90 kg (198 lb)

Sport
- Country: Czech Republic
- Sport: Badminton

Men's singles
- Highest ranking: 38 (23 Sep 2010)
- Current ranking: 87 (17 Nov 2016)
- BWF profile

Petr Koukal (Czech pronunciation: [ˈpɛtr̩ ˈkoukal]; born 14 December 1985) is a Czech professional badminton player.

== Biography ==
Koukal started playing badminton in 1993, at a club owned by his father in Hořovice, and made his debut in the international tournament in 2000. In 2003 he was selected to join the national team, and at the same year, he won the mixed doubles title at the national championships partnered with Markéta Koudelková. Until 2016, he has collected 9 national titles, where 8 of them won in the men's singles event. Koukal first competed at the Summer Olympics in Beijing.

In 2010, Koukal was diagnosed with testicular cancer and underwent a successful therapy. He was awarded 2011 Fair Play Award, in Brno, Czech Republic. In July 2012, Czech Olympic Committee announced selection of Koukal for flag bearer of Czech team at the 2012 Summer Olympics in London, citing him as an example of sport role in recovery from a grave illness and of return to competition at top level.

In 2016, Petr Koukal was awarded as the secondary recipient of the Hanno R. Ellenbogen Citizenship Award for his commitment and help to men with testicular cancer through his foundation. In May 2016, Koukal married Czech biathlete Gabriela Soukalová; they divorced in late 2020. He made his third appearance at the Summer Olympics through the Tripartite Commission Invitation.

== Achievements ==
=== BWF Grand Prix ===
The BWF Grand Prix has two levels: Grand Prix and Grand Prix Gold. It is a series of badminton tournaments, sanctioned by the Badminton World Federation (BWF) since 2007.

Men's Singles
| Year | Tournament | Opponent | Score | Result |
|---|---|---|---|---|
| 2014 | U.S. Grand Prix | (Chinese Taipei) Hsu Jen-hao | 19–21, 21–19, 8–21 | (silver) Runner-up |

BWF Grand Prix Gold tournament
BWF Grand Prix tournament

=== BWF International Challenge/Series ===
Men's Singles
| Year | Tournament | Opponent | Score | Result |
|---|---|---|---|---|
| 2011 | Czech International | (Poland) Przemyslaw Wacha | 19–21, 16–21 | (silver) Runner-up |
| 2011 | Slovak Open | (Poland) Hubert Paczek | 21–11, 21–15 | (gold) Winner |
| 2009 | Czech International | (Ukraine) Dmytro Zavadsky | 21–17, 21–19 | (gold) Winner |
| 2007 | Iceland International | (Portugal) Marco Vasconcelos | 21–17, 21–16 | (gold) Winner |
| 2007 | Turkey International | (Denmark) Hans-Kristian Vittinghus | 21–23, 15–21 | (silver) Runner-up |
| 2007 | Le Volant d'Or de Toulouse | (Poland) Przemyslaw Wacha | 13–21, 17–21 | (silver) Runner-up |
| 2007 | Hatzor International | (Japan) Sho Sasaki | 15–21, 16–21 | (silver) Runner-up |
| 2006 | Le Volant d'Or de Toulouse | (Finland) Ville Lång | 18–21, 15–21 | (silver) Runner-up |
| 2004 | Lithuanian International | (Poland) Rafal Hawel | 15–3, 13–15, 4–15 | (silver) Runner-up |

Mixed Doubles
| Year | Tournament | Partner | Opponent | Score | Result |
|---|---|---|---|---|---|
| 2004 | Lithuanian International | (Czech Republic) Martina Benešová | (Czech Republic) Stanislav Kohoutek (Lithuania) Akvilė Stapušaitytė | 15–3, 15–13 | (gold) Winner |

BWF International Challenge tournament
BWF International Series tournament

=== Other ===
- 2006 - Spanish International: Men's singles (quarter final)
- 2006 - Austrian International: Men's singles (quarter final)
- 2006 - Austrian International: Mixed doubles (quarter final)
- 2005 - Hungarian International: Men's singles (semi final)
- 2005 - Babolat Slovak International: Men's singles (semi final)
- 2005 - Babolat Slovak International: Mixed doubles (semi final)
- 2003 - Slovenia International: Mixed doubles (quarter final)
- 2003 - Slovak International: Mixed doubles (quarter final)
- 2003 - Czech International: Mixed doubles (quarter final)
- 2003 - Sofiisk Imoti JSC Bulgarian International: Mixed doubles (semi final)
- 2002 - Slovak International: Mixed doubles (quarter final)

Olympic Games
| Preceded by Štěpánka Hilgertová | Flagbearer for Czech Republic; London 2012 | Succeeded by Lukáš Krpálek |
