= Milan Ludík =

Czech badminton player (born 1992)

Personal information
- Born: 9 September 1992 (age 34) Trenčín, Czechoslovakia
- Height: 1.90 m (6 ft 3 in)
- Weight: 91 kg (201 lb)

Sport
- Country: Czech Republic
- Sport: Badminton
- Coached by: Petr Ludík

Men's singles & doubles
- Highest ranking: 56 (MS 1 October 2015); 184 (MD 17 September 2015); 300 (XD 22 October 2009)
- BWF profile

Milan Ludík (born 9 September 1992) is a Czech badminton player.

== Personal life ==
In August 2020, Ludik married Mauritius' badminton player, Kate Foo Kune.

== Achievements ==
=== BWF International Challenge/Series (4 titles, 5 runners-up) ===
Men's singles
Year	Tournament	Opponent	Score	Result
2015	Iceland International	(Austria) Matthias Almer	21–9, 21–19	(gold) Winner
2015	Iran Fajr International	(Austria) David Obernosterer	13–21, 21–19, 17–21	(silver) Runner-up
2016	Tahiti International	(Italy) Indra Bagus Ade Chandra	22–24, 21–18, 9–21	(silver) Runner-up
2016	Egypt International	(Czech Republic) Adam Mendrek	21–13, 22–20	(gold) Winner
2017	Czech International	(Israel) Daniel Chislov	21–19, 21–15	(gold) Winner
2019	Egypt International	(Azerbaijan) Ade Resky Dwicahyo	17–21, 12–21	(silver) Runner-up
2019	South Africa International	(Austria) Luka Wraber	Walkover	(silver) Runner-up

Men's doubles
Year	Tournament	Partner	Opponent	Score	Result
2015	Uganda International	(Uganda) Edwin Ekiring	(Czech Republic) Pavel Florián (Czech Republic) Ondřej Kopřiva	11–7, 5–11, 11–10, 6–11, 8–11	(silver) Runner-up

Mixed doubles
Year	Tournament	Partner	Opponent	Score	Result
2014	Venezuela International	(United States) Bo Rong	(Peru) Mario Cuba (Peru) Katherine Winder	21–16, 21–16	(gold) Winner

BWF International Challenge tournament
BWF International Series tournament
BWF Future Series tournament
