= Angelica Wiratama =

Indonesian badminton player (born 1999)

Personal information
- Born: 25 June 1999 (age 27) Jakarta, Indonesia

Sport
- Country: Indonesia
- Sport: Badminton
- Handedness: Left

Women's & mixed doubles
- Highest ranking: 337 (WD with Pitha Haningtyas Mentari 9 August 2018); 114 (XD with Andika Ramadiansyah 13 July 2017); 125 (XD with Rinov Rivaldy 12 April 2018); 198 (XD with Renaldi Samosir 17 March 2020); 249 (XD with Alfian Eko Prasetya 17 March 2020); 303 (XD with Zachariah Josiahno Sumanti 17 March 2020); 523 (XD with Akbar Bintang Cahyono 17 March 2020)
- Current ranking: 235 (XD with Renaldi Samosir); 291 (XD with Alfian Eko Prasetya); 354(XD with Zachariah Josiahno Sumanti); 599 (XD with Akbar Bintang Cahyono) (17 August 2021)
- BWF profile
Medal record
Women's badminton
Representing Indonesia
Asian Junior Championships
Silver medal – second place	2017 Jakarta	Mixed team

Angelica Wiratama (born 25 June 1999) is an Indonesian badminton player affiliated with Exist Jakarta team.

== Achievements ==
=== BWF World Tour (1 runner-up) ===
The BWF World Tour, which was announced on 19 March 2017 and implemented in 2018, is a series of elite badminton tournaments sanctioned by the Badminton World Federation (BWF). The BWF World Tour is divided into levels of World Tour Finals, Super 1000, Super 750, Super 500, Super 300 (part of the HSBC World Tour), and the BWF Tour Super 100.

Mixed doubles
Year	Tournament	Level	Partner	Opponent	Score	Result
2018	Akita Masters	Super 100	(Indonesia) Alfian Eko Prasetya	(Japan) Kohei Gondo (Japan) Ayane Kurihara	9–21, 23–21, 17–21	(silver) Runner-up

=== BWF International Challenge/Series (1 runner-up) ===
Mixed doubles
Year	Tournament	Partner	Opponent	Score	Result
2016	Vietnam International	(Indonesia) Andika Ramadiansyah	(Indonesia) Rinov Rivaldy (Indonesia) Vania Arianti Sukoco	15–21, 20–22	(silver) Runner-up

BWF International Challenge tournament
BWF Future Series tournament

== Performance timeline ==
Key

W	Won	F	Finalist	SF	Semi-finalist
QF	Quarter-finalist	#R	Rounds 4, 3, 2, 1	RR	Round-robin stage
Q#	Qualification round	A	Absent	w/d	Withdrew
G	Gold	S	Silver	B	Bronze
NH	Not held	N/A	Not applicable	DNQ	Did not qualify

=== National team ===
- Junior level

Team event	2017
Asian Junior Championships	S
World Junior Championships	5th

=== Individual competitions ===
- Junior level

Events	2016	2017
Asian Junior Championships	A	3R
World Junior Championships	4R (XD)	QF (XD)

Tournament	BWF Superseries / Grand Prix		BWF World Tour				Best
Tournament	2016	2017	2018	2019	2020	2021	Best
Lingshui China Masters	N/A		A	1R	NH		1R ('19)
Spain Masters	NH		A			2R	2R ('21)
Indonesia Masters	1R	NH	2R (XD)	A			2R ('18)
Indonesia Open	A	Q1	A		NH		Q1 ('17)
Akita Masters	NH		1R (WD); F (XD)	A	NH		F ('18)
Hyderabad Open	NH		1R (WD); 2R (XD)	A	NH		2R ('18)
Chinese Taipei Open	A			1R	NH		1R ('19)
Vietnam Open	A			Q2	NH		Q2 ('19)
Indonesia Masters Super 100	NH		QF (XD)	SF	NH		SF ('19)
Year-end ranking	128	202	384 (WD); 129 (XD)	222	198		337 (WD); 114 (XD)
