= 2018 Bangka Belitung Indonesia Masters =

Tournament details
- Dates: 18–23 September
- Edition: 1st
- Level: Super 100
- Total prize money: US$75,000
- Venue: Sahabudin Sports Hall
- Location: Pangkal Pinang, Bangka Belitung, Indonesia

Champions
- Men's singles: (Indonesia) Ihsan Maulana Mustofa
- Women's singles: (Japan) Minatsu Mitani
- Men's doubles: (Chinese Taipei) Chang Ko-chi (Chinese Taipei) Lu Chia-pin
- Women's doubles: (Japan) Ayako Sakuramoto (Japan) Yukiko Takahata
- Mixed doubles: (Indonesia) Rinov Rivaldy (Indonesia) Pitha Haningtyas Mentari

The 2018 Bangka Belitung Indonesia Masters was a badminton tournament which took place at Sahabudin Sports Hall in Pangkal Pinang, Bangka Belitung, Indonesia from 18 to 23 September 2018 and had a total purse of $75,000.

== Tournament ==
The 2018 Bangka Belitung Indonesia Masters was the eighth Super 100 tournament of the 2018 BWF World Tour and also part of the Indonesia Masters Super 100 championships, which was held for the first time. This tournament was organized by the Badminton Association of Indonesia with the sanction from the BWF.

=== Venue ===
This international tournament was held at Sahabudin Sports Hall in Pangkal Pinang, Bangka Belitung, Indonesia.

=== Point distribution ===
Below is the point distribution table for each phase of the tournament based on the BWF points system for the BWF Tour Super 100 event.

Winner	Runner-up	3/4	5/8	9/16	17/32	33/64	65/128	129/256
5,500	4,680	3,850	3,030	2,110	1,290	510	240	100

=== Prize money ===
The total prize money for this tournament was US$75,000. Distribution of prize money was in accordance with BWF regulations.

Event	Winner	Finals	Semi-finals	Quarter-finals	Last 16
Singles	$5,625	$2,850	$1,087.50	$450	$262.50
Doubles	$5,925	$2,850	$1,050	$543.75	$281.25

== Men's singles ==
=== Seeds ===
1. (Indonesia) Ihsan Maulana Mustofa (champion)
2. (Thailand) Sitthikom Thammasin (third round)
3. (Malaysia) Iskandar Zulkarnain (second round)
4. (Indonesia) Sony Dwi Kuncoro (withdrew)
5. (Indonesia) Panji Ahmad Maulana (quarter-finals)
6. (Indonesia) Shesar Hiren Rhustavito (semi-finals)
7. (Chinese Taipei) Lin Yu-hsien (final)
8. (Indonesia) Firman Abdul Kholik (semi-finals)

=== Finals ===
Semi-finals
1	(Indonesia) Ihsan Maulana Mustofa	21	21
6	(Indonesia) Shesar Hiren Rhustavito	10	10
8	(Indonesia) Firman Abdul Kholik	15	18
7	(Chinese Taipei) Lin Yu-hsien	21	21

Final
1	(Indonesia) Ihsan Maulana Mustofa	21	23
7	(Chinese Taipei) Lin Yu-hsien	17	21

=== Top half ===
==== Section 1 ====
First Round
(Indonesia) F I Hadmadi	21	21
Q2	(Indonesia) R Subagja	9	18
(Malaysia) M Z Md Tah	19	21	14
Q8	(Indonesia) S P Belawa	21	18	21
Q5	(Indonesia) M Febriansyah	22	21	21
(Thailand) A Namkul	24	19	13
(Malaysia) Lim C W	17	21	21
Q3	(Indonesia) M R Diaz	21	11	12

Second Round
1	(Indonesia) I M Mustofa	21	18	21
(Indonesia) F I Hadmadi	16	21	17
(Canada) Huang GX	12	21	14
Q8	(Indonesia) S P Belawa	21	14	21
5	(Indonesia) P A Maulana	21	21
Q5	(Indonesia) M Febriansyah	13	7
(Canada) Sheng XD	21	21
(Malaysia) Lim C W	19	15

Third Round
1	(Indonesia) I M Mustofa	21	22
Q8	(Indonesia) S P Belawa	16	20
5	(Indonesia) P A Maulana	21	21
(Canada) Sheng XD	11	17

Quarter-finals
1	(Indonesia) I M Mustofa	21	21
5	(Indonesia) P A Maulana	15	17

==== Section 2 ====
First Round
(Japan) K Naito	21	21
(Indonesia) Karono	16	19
(Indonesia) I Rumbay	15	21	21
(Thailand) K Leelavechabutr	21	11	14
(Indonesia) M B Pangisthu	21	21
(Chile) Q Zheng	13	15
Q1	(Indonesia) I S M Mustaqim	21	11
(Indonesia) A Marteen	23	21

Second Round
PFQ	(Malaysia) Z Zulkiffli	21	12	18
(Japan) K Naito	18	21	21
Q4	(Indonesia) A K Zailani	19	10
(Indonesia) I Rumbay	21	21
6	(Indonesia) S H Rhustavito	21	21
(Indonesia) M B Pangisthu	17	14
(India) K. A Kumar	21	19	20
(Indonesia) A Marteen	16	21	22

Third Round
(Japan) K Naito	15	12
(Indonesia) I Rumbay	21	21
6	(Indonesia) S H Rhustavito	21	19	21
(Indonesia) A Marteen	11	21	14

Quarter-finals
(Indonesia) I Rumbay	25	21	19
6	(Indonesia) S H Rhustavito	27	10	21

=== Bottom half ===
==== Section 3 ====
First Round
(Chinese Taipei) Cheng E-c	21	21
(Singapore) R Ng Z R	12	19
(Indonesia) C A D Wardoyo	21	21
(Malaysia) M I Shamsul Muzli	15	12
(Malaysia) Soong J V	17	0^{r}
(Indonesia) V A Saputra	21	0
(Indonesia) K A Nugraha	21	21
Q6	(Indonesia) Y Ramlie	14	12

Second Round
(Chinese Taipei) Cheng E-c	21	17	14
Q7	(Indonesia) B K Nugroho	19	21	21
(Indonesia) C A D Wardoyo	21	19	18
8	(Indonesia) F A Kholik	19	21	21
(Indonesia) V A Saputra	21	21
(Indonesia) N T A Kurniawan	15	16
(Indonesia) K A Nugraha	16	21	21
3	(Malaysia) I Zulkarnain	21	15	17

Third Round
Q7	(Indonesia) B K Nugroho	19	11
8	(Indonesia) F A Kholik	21	21
(Indonesia) V A Saputra	15	23	13
(Indonesia) K A Nugraha	21	21	21

Quarter-finals
8	(Indonesia) F A Kholik	21	21
(Indonesia) K A Nugraha	17	16

==== Section 4 ====
First Round
(Indonesia) G P Fiqihilahi	15	21	13
(Chinese Taipei) Lin C-y	21	16	21
(Malaysia) M R Misbun	18	16
(Chinese Taipei) Lee C-h	21	21
(Indonesia) A A Yulianto	17	14
(India) L Sen	21	21
(Japan) R Maruo	21	21
(Chinese Taipei) Liang H-c	10	9

Second Round
(Chinese Taipei) Lin C-y	21	21
(India) K Gulshan Kumar	13	16
(Chinese Taipei) Lee C-h	17	16
7	(Chinese Taipei) Lin Y-h	21	21
(India) L Sen	21	21
PFQ	(Indonesia) H Y Wijayanto	14	19
(Japan) R Maruo	7	13
2	(Thailand) S Thammasin	21	21

Third Round
(Chinese Taipei) Lin C-y	15	13
7	(Chinese Taipei) Lin Y-h	21	21
(India) L Sen	21	21
2	(Thailand) S Thammasin	19	15

Quarter-finals
7	(Chinese Taipei) Lin Y-h	12	22	21
(India) L Sen	21	20	14

== Women's singles ==
=== Seeds ===
1. (Japan) Minatsu Mitani (champion)
2. (Indonesia) Fitriani (quarter-finals)
3. (Indonesia) Dinar Dyah Ayustine (first round)
4. (Hong Kong) Deng Xuan (semi-finals)
5. (Chinese Taipei) Sung Shuo-yun (first round)
6. (Indonesia) Yulia Yosephine Susanto (semi-finals)
7. (Chinese Taipei) Chen Su-yu (second round)
8. (India) Sri Krishna Priya Kudaravalli (second round)

=== Finals ===
Semi-finals
1	(Japan) Minatsu Mitani	18	21	21
4	(Hong Kong) Deng Xuan	21	16	19
(Japan) Shiori Saito	21	21
6	(Indonesia) Yulia Yosephine Susanto	18	9

Final
1	(Japan) Minatsu Mitani	21	21
(Japan) Shiori Saito	16	12

=== Top half ===
==== Section 1 ====
First Round
1	(Japan) M Mitani	21	21
(Indonesia) S Wulandari	9	19
(Indonesia) A O Winata	17	21	16
(United States) C Pan	21	12	21
7	(Chinese Taipei) Chen S-y	21	18	23
(Indonesia) B S Rahayu	6	21	21
Q3	(Indonesia) S Widjaja	10	9
(Indonesia) Choirunnisa	21	21

Second Round
1	(Japan) M Mitani	21	22
(United States) C Pan	17	20
7	(Chinese Taipei) Chen S-y	10	21	10
(Indonesia) Choirunnisa	21	17	21

Quarter-finals
1	(Japan) M Mitani	21	16	21
(Indonesia) Choirunnisa	16	21	18

==== Section 2 ====
First Round
4	(Hong Kong) Deng X	21	21
(Indonesia) H Ramadini	9	12
Q4	(Hong Kong) Yeung S Y	21	21
(Indonesia) W C U Sukoputri	9	11
8	(India) S K P Kudaravalli	21	21
(Indonesia) D A Syarafina	19	11
(Indonesia) M S Batari	11	9
(Japan) S Yamamoto	21	21

Second Round
4	(Hong Kong) Deng X	21	21
Q4	(Hong Kong) Yeung S Y	11	3
8	(India) S K P Kudaravalli	14	8
(Japan) S Yamamoto	21	21

Quarter-finals
4	(Hong Kong) Deng X	21	21
(Japan) S Yamamoto	7	16

=== Bottom half ===
==== Section 3 ====
First Round
(Japan) S Saito	14	21	21
(Indonesia) G M Moningka	21	19	12
Q1	(Indonesia) P K Wardani	21	21
5	(Chinese Taipei) Sung S-y	13	17
(Singapore) Yeo J M	19	21	13
(Indonesia) R Hartawan	21	16	21
(Thailand) S Katethong	12	21	24
3	(Indonesia) D D Ayustine	21	10	22

Second Round
(Japan) S Saito	21	21
Q1	(Indonesia) P K Wardani	11	16
(Indonesia) R Hartawan	21	21
(Thailand) S Katethong	12	14

Quarter-finals
(Japan) S Saito	15	21	21
(Indonesia) R Hartawan	21	18	12

==== Section 4 ====
First Round
(Indonesia) A D Widdyaningrum	21	21
(Chinese Taipei) Hsieh Y-y	18	19
(United States) I Rusli	10	10
6	(Indonesia) Y Y Susanto	21	21
(Indonesia) S Fatmawati	21	21
Q2	(Indonesia) O C M Kambey	15	11
(Chinese Taipei) Lin H-t	15	18
2	(Indonesia) Fitriani	21	21

Second Round
(Indonesia) A D Widdyaningrum	17	22	11
6	(Indonesia) Y Y Susanto	21	20	21
(Indonesia) S Fatmawati	6	15
2	(Indonesia) Fitriani	21	21

Quarter-finals
6	(Indonesia) Y Y Susanto	21	9	22
2	(Indonesia) Fitriani	14	21	20

== Men's doubles ==
=== Seeds ===
1. (Thailand) Inkarat Apisuk / Tanupat Viriyangkura (first round)
2. (Indonesia) Akbar Bintang Cahyono / Muhammad Reza Pahlevi Isfahani (semi-finals)
3. (Japan) Keiichiro Matsui / Yoshinori Takeuchi (second round)
4. (Vietnam) Bảo Minh / Dương Bảo Đức (first round)
5. (Thailand) Nipitphon Phuangphuapet / Nanthakarn Yordphaisong (quarter-finals)
6. (Chinese Taipei) Chang Ko-chi / Lu Chia-pin (champions)
7. (India) Tarun Kona / (Malaysia) Lim Khim Wah (first round)
8. (Chinese Taipei) Lu Chen / Ye Hong-wei (quarter-finals)

=== Finals ===
Semi-finals
(Indonesia) Frengky Wijaya Putra (Indonesia) Rian Agung Saputro	18	13
(South Korea) Ko Sung-hyun (South Korea) Shin Baek-cheol	21	21
6	(Chinese Taipei) Chang Ko-chi (Chinese Taipei) Lu Chia-pin	16	21	21
2	(Indonesia) Akbar Bintang Cahyono (Indonesia) Muhammad Reza Pahlevi Isfahani	21	19	15

Final
(South Korea) Ko Sung-hyun (South Korea) Shin Baek-cheol	21	13
6	(Chinese Taipei) Chang Ko-chi (Chinese Taipei) Lu Chia-pin	23	21

=== Top half ===
==== Section 1 ====
First Round
1	(Thailand) I Apisuk (Thailand) T Viriyangkura	13	15
(Indonesia) F W Putra (Indonesia) R A Saputro	21	21
(Indonesia) M Fachrikar (Indonesia) R D Purnama	18	17
(Thailand) M Narongrit (Thailand) W Phakrajung	21	21
5	(Thailand) N Phuangphuapet (Thailand) N Yordphaisong	21	21
(Indonesia) V J Fernando (Indonesia) F M Ranialdy	14	19
Q3	(Indonesia) A Barriq (Indonesia) P E Rhoma	21	19	21
(Indonesia) Y Pamungkas (Indonesia) N L Saufik	17	21	12

Second Round
(Indonesia) F W Putra (Indonesia) R A Saputro	21	21
(Thailand) M Narongrit (Thailand) W Phakrajung	16	17
5	(Thailand) N Phuangphuapet (Thailand) N Yordphaisong	21	21
Q3	(Indonesia) A Barriq (Indonesia) P E Rhoma	14	12

Quarter-finals
(Indonesia) F W Putra (Indonesia) R A Saputro	21	22
5	(Thailand) N Phuangphuapet (Thailand) N Yordphaisong	17	20

==== Section 2 ====
First Round
3	(Japan) K Matsui (Japan) Y Takeuchi	25	16	21
(Indonesia) G A Prihardika (Indonesia) P Kusumawardana	23	21	12
(Indonesia) I Fadhilah (Indonesia) M Kido	17	14
(South Korea) Ko S-h (South Korea) Shin B-c	21	21
7	(India) T Kona (Malaysia) Lim K W	29	19
(Indonesia) R Dhanriano (Indonesia) H Gustiawan	30	21
(Japan) M Takano (Japan) Y Tsukamoto	w	/	o
(India) Vaibhaav (India) P Raj

Second Round
3	(Japan) K Matsui (Japan) Y Takeuchi	17	10
(South Korea) Ko S-h (South Korea) Shin B-c	21	21
(Indonesia) R Dhanriano (Indonesia) H Gustiawan	23	18	21
(Japan) M Takano (Japan) Y Tsukamoto	21	21	13

Quarter-finals
(South Korea) Ko S-h (South Korea) Shin B-c	21	21
(Indonesia) R Dhanriano (Indonesia) H Gustiawan	17	18

=== Bottom half ===
==== Section 3 ====
First Round
Q2	(Indonesia) K A Haryanto (Indonesia) A P R Putra	21	23	13
(Indonesia) R Swastedian (Indonesia) A Syahnawi	15	25	21
(Indonesia) E R Febryto (Indonesia) A Maulana	23	18	19
6	(Chinese Taipei) Chang K-c (Chinese Taipei) Lu C-p	21	21	21
Q1	(Chinese Taipei) Lin Y-c (Chinese Taipei) Wu Y-c	21	21
Q4	(Indonesia) R Rivaldy (Indonesia) Y Rambitan	16	17
(Indonesia) H A Gunawan (Indonesia) R Asuro	21	21
4	(Vietnam) Bảo M (Vietnam) Dương B Đ	14	9

Second Round
(Indonesia) R Swastedian (Indonesia) A Syahnawi	13	19
6	(Chinese Taipei) Chang K-c (Chinese Taipei) Lu C-p	21	21
Q1	(Chinese Taipei) Lin Y-c (Chinese Taipei) Wu Y-c	20	21	21
(Indonesia) H A Gunawan (Indonesia) R Asuro	22	11	16

Quarter-finals
6	(Chinese Taipei) Chang K-c (Chinese Taipei) Lu C-p	21	18	21
Q1	(Chinese Taipei) Lin Y-c (Chinese Taipei) Wu Y-c	12	21	16

==== Section 4 ====
First Round
(Indonesia) M S Fikri (Indonesia) B Maulana	23	19	21
(Chinese Taipei) Lee C-h (Chinese Taipei) Po L-w	21	21	18
(Indonesia) C Kristianto (Indonesia) G D Oktavan	16	21	13
8	(Chinese Taipei) Lu C (Chinese Taipei) Ye H-w	21	15	21
(Chinese Taipei) Lee F-c (Chinese Taipei) Lee F-j	21	23
(Indonesia) M. L A Apriyanda (Indonesia) R Banuaji	16	21
(India) H K Chereddi (India) K. A Kumar	6	9
2	(Indonesia) A B Cahyono (Indonesia) M R P Isfahani	21	21

Second Round
(Indonesia) M S Fikri (Indonesia) B Maulana	21	12	17
8	(Chinese Taipei) Lu C (Chinese Taipei) Ye H-w	12	21	21
(Chinese Taipei) Lee F-c (Chinese Taipei) Lee F-j	10	11
2	(Indonesia) A B Cahyono (Indonesia) M R P Isfahani	21	21

Quarter-finals
8	(Chinese Taipei) Lu C (Chinese Taipei) Ye H-w	16	18
2	(Indonesia) A B Cahyono (Indonesia) M R P Isfahani	21	21

== Women's doubles ==
=== Seeds ===
1. (Japan) Ayako Sakuramoto / Yukiko Takahata (champions)
2. (Japan) Nami Matsuyama / Chiharu Shida (final)
3. (Japan) Misato Aratama / Akane Watanabe (second round)
4. (Thailand) Savitree Amitrapai / Pacharapun Chochuwong (second round)
5. (Japan) Miki Kashihara / Miyuki Kato (quarter-finals)
6. (Indonesia) Agatha Imanuela / Siti Fadia Silva Ramadhanti (quarter-finals)
7. (Indonesia) Pitha Haningtyas Mentari / Rosyita Eka Putri Sari (first round)
8. (Japan) Akane Araki / Riko Imai (semi-finals)

=== Finals ===
Semi-finals
1	(Japan) Ayako Sakuramoto (Japan) Yukiko Takahata	21	21
8	(Japan) Akane Araki (Japan) Riko Imai	10	12
(Indonesia) Febriana Dwipuji Kusuma (Indonesia) Ribka Sugiarto	14	10
2	(Japan) Nami Matsuyama (Japan) Chiharu Shida	21	21

Final
1	(Japan) Ayako Sakuramoto (Japan) Yukiko Takahata	11	21	22
2	(Japan) Nami Matsuyama (Japan) Chiharu Shida	21	19	20

=== Top half ===
==== Section 1 ====
First Round
1	(Japan) A Sakuramoto (Japan) Y Takahata	21	21
(Indonesia) T O Kusumah (Indonesia) V A Sukoco	5	13
Q1	(Indonesia) M C Bandaso (Indonesia) S Kani	20	13
(Indonesia) M D Giovani (Indonesia) M Mahmudin	22	21
5	(Japan) M Kashihara (Japan) M Kato	21	21
(Indonesia) D D Budiani (Indonesia) N A D Ulhaq	11	5
(Indonesia) S D Aulia (Indonesia) M Insani	10	10
(Chinese Taipei) Chang C-h (Chinese Taipei) Yang C-t	21	21

Second Round
1	(Japan) A Sakuramoto (Japan) Y Takahata	19	21	21
(Indonesia) M D Giovani (Indonesia) M Mahmudin	21	11	16
5	(Japan) M Kashihara (Japan) M Kato	21	21
(Chinese Taipei) Chang C-h (Chinese Taipei) Yang C-t	18	15

Quarter-finals
1	(Japan) A Sakuramoto (Japan) Y Takahata	21	21
5	(Japan) M Kashihara (Japan) M Kato	14	4

==== Section 2 ====
First Round
4	(Thailand) S Amitrapai (Thailand) P Chochuwong	21	21
(Indonesia) D B Anjani (Indonesia) D D Cahyaning	5	14
(Indonesia) L A Kusumawati (Indonesia) V Putri	16	12
(Japan) R Kawashima (Japan) S Ozaki	21	21
8	(Japan) A Araki (Japan) R Imai	18	21	22
(Indonesia) P Z Bernadeth (Indonesia) T R Nuraidah	21	19	20
(Indonesia) D Fitriani (Indonesia) N Melati	11	19
(Japan) M Kawashima (Japan) A Matsuda	21	21

Second Round
4	(Thailand) S Amitrapai (Thailand) P Chochuwong	18	21	17
(Japan) R Kawashima (Japan) S Ozaki	21	18	21
8	(Japan) A Araki (Japan) R Imai	15	21	21
(Japan) M Kawashima (Japan) A Matsuda	21	16	13

Quarter-finals
(Japan) R Kawashima (Japan) S Ozaki	19	17
8	(Japan) A Araki (Japan) R Imai	21	21

=== Bottom half ===
==== Section 3 ====
First Round
Q2	(Indonesia) L T Mayasari (Indonesia) T Nadia	16	16
(Indonesia) R V Salsabila (Indonesia) P A Wahyuningrum	21	21
(Thailand) C Korepap (Thailand) K Sudjaipraparat	15	11
6	(Indonesia) A Imanuela (Indonesia) S F S Ramadhanti	21	21
(Indonesia) F D Kusuma (Indonesia) R Sugiarto	20	21	21
(Chinese Taipei) Chang H-t (Chinese Taipei) Cheng C-y	22	12	19
(Indonesia) A G L Maharani (Indonesia) A R Putri	20	16
3	(Japan) M Aratama (Japan) A Watanabe	22	21

Second Round
(Indonesia) R V Salsabila (Indonesia) P A Wahyuningrum	13	10
6	(Indonesia) A Imanuela (Indonesia) S F S Ramadhanti	21	21
(Indonesia) F D Kusuma (Indonesia) R Sugiarto	13	21	21
3	(Japan) M Aratama (Japan) A Watanabe	21	14	19

Quarter-finals
6	(Indonesia) A Imanuela (Indonesia) S F S Ramadhanti	21	15	10
(Indonesia) F D Kusuma (Indonesia) R Sugiarto	17	21	21

==== Section 4 ====
First Round
(Indonesia) R Amelia (Indonesia) B M Rumambi	21	18	21
(Chinese Taipei) Chen S-y (Chinese Taipei) Sung S-y	19	21	11
Q4	(Indonesia) Y Barkah (Indonesia) J F Sugiarto	21	19	21
7	(Indonesia) P H Mentari (Indonesia) R E P Sari	16	21	10
Q3	(Indonesia) N V Marwah (Indonesia) P Syaikah	21	18	21
(Indonesia) K N Hanadia (Indonesia) D T Permatasari	9	21	17
(Indonesia) M I Cindiani (Indonesia) F V D Gani	14	16
2	(Japan) N Matsuyama (Japan) C Shida	21	21

Second Round
(Indonesia) R Amelia (Indonesia) B M Rumambi	23	15	16
Q4	(Indonesia) Y Barkah (Indonesia) J F Sugiarto	21	21	21
Q3	(Indonesia) N V Marwah (Indonesia) P Syaikah	13	9
2	(Japan) N Matsuyama (Japan) C Shida	21	21

Quarter-finals
Q4	(Indonesia) Y Barkah (Indonesia) J F Sugiarto	21	19	11
2	(Japan) N Matsuyama (Japan) C Shida	14	21	21

== Mixed doubles ==
=== Seeds ===
1. (Indonesia) Akbar Bintang Cahyono / Winny Oktavina Kandow (first round)
2. (Chinese Taipei) Chang Ko-chi / Cheng Chi-ya (semi-finals)
3. (Indonesia) Rinov Rivaldy / Pitha Haningtyas Mentari (champions)
4. (Thailand) Nipitphon Phuangphuapet / Savitree Amitrapai (final)
5. (Indonesia) Alfian Eko Prasetya / Marsheilla Gischa Islami (first round)
6. (Indonesia) Rehan Naufal Kusharjanto / Siti Fadia Silva Ramadhanti (second round)
7. (Malaysia) Mohamad Arif Abdul Latif / (Indonesia) Rusydina Antardayu Riodingin (withdrew)
8. (Indonesia) Irfan Fadhilah / Pia Zebadiah Bernadeth (quarter-finals)

=== Finals ===
Semi-finals
(Indonesia) Andika Ramadiansyah (Indonesia) Bunga Fitriani Romadhini	12	15
4	(Thailand) Nipitphon Phuangphuapet (Thailand) Savitree Amitrapai	21	21
3	(Indonesia) Rinov Rivaldy (Indonesia) Pitha Haningtyas Mentari	21	21
2	(Chinese Taipei) Chang Ko-chi (Chinese Taipei) Cheng Chi-ya	16	11

Final
4	(Thailand) Nipitphon Phuangphuapet (Thailand) Savitree Amitrapai	19	18
3	(Indonesia) Rinov Rivaldy (Indonesia) Pitha Haningtyas Mentari	21	21

=== Top half ===
==== Section 1 ====
First Round
1	(Indonesia) A B Cahyono (Indonesia) W O Kandow	21	17	17
(Indonesia) R Widianto (Indonesia) T R Nuraidah	19	21	21
(Indonesia) E R Purnomo (Indonesia) R A I Sari	16	10
(Thailand) M Narongrit (Thailand) P Chochuwong	21	21
5	(Indonesia) A E Prasetya (Indonesia) M G Islami	19	21	19
(Indonesia) P Kusumawardana (Indonesia) R Sugiarto	21	11	21
(Thailand) W Phakrajung (Thailand) C Korepap	17	14
(Indonesia) A Ramadiansyah (Indonesia) B F Romadhini	21	21

Second Round
(Indonesia) R Widianto (Indonesia) T R Nuraidah	19	14
(Thailand) M Narongrit (Thailand) P Chochuwong	21	21
(Indonesia) P Kusumawardana (Indonesia) R Sugiarto	20	10
(Indonesia) A Ramadiansyah (Indonesia) B F Romadhini	22	21

Quarter-finals
(Thailand) M Narongrit (Thailand) P Chochuwong	14	22	15
(Indonesia) A Ramadiansyah (Indonesia) B F Romadhini	21	20	21

==== Section 2 ====
First Round
4	(Thailand) N Phuangphuapet (Thailand) S Amitrapai	21	17	21
(Indonesia) A Syahnawi (Indonesia) S D Aulia	16	21	16
Q3	(Thailand) T Viriyangkura (Thailand) K Sudjaipraparat	15	21	21
(Indonesia) A Maulana (Indonesia) M Mahmudin	21	13	18
8	(Indonesia) I Fadhilah (Indonesia) P Z Bernadeth	21	21
(Chinese Taipei) Po L-w (Chinese Taipei) Chang C-h	12	14
(Indonesia) Y E Saputra (Indonesia) S Kani	18	21	21
Q2	(Indonesia) N L Saufik (Indonesia) A G L Maharani	21	13	17

Second Round
4	(Thailand) N Phuangphuapet (Thailand) S Amitrapai	21	17	21
Q3	(Thailand) T Viriyangkura (Thailand) K Sudjaipraparat	16	21	13
8	(Indonesia) I Fadhilah (Indonesia) P Z Bernadeth	21	21
(Indonesia) Y E Saputra (Indonesia) S Kani	5	17

Quarter-finals
4	(Thailand) N Phuangphuapet (Thailand) S Amitrapai	21	21
8	(Indonesia) I Fadhilah (Indonesia) P Z Bernadeth	15	19

=== Bottom half ===
==== Section 3 ====
First Round
(Indonesia) F Abimanyu (Indonesia) M C Bandaso	21	21
Q4	(Indonesia) F M Ranialdy (Indonesia) A Mubarokah	15	19
(Indonesia) R Swastedian (Indonesia) N Melati	27	21
PFQ	(Indonesia) R Samosir (Indonesia) H Julimarbela	25	18
Q1	(Indonesia) D Marthin (Indonesia) I C S Jamil	14	20
(Indonesia) G A Prihardika (Indonesia) L A Kusumawati	21	22
(Indonesia) A Barriq (Indonesia) M Insani	14	11
3	(Indonesia) R Rivaldy (Indonesia) P H Mentari	21	21

Second Round
(Indonesia) F Abimanyu (Indonesia) M C Bandaso	17	16
(Indonesia) R Swastedian (Indonesia) N Melati	21	21
(Indonesia) G A Prihardika (Indonesia) L A Kusumawati	21	14	21
3	(Indonesia) R Rivaldy (Indonesia) P H Mentari	13	21	23

Quarter-finals
(Indonesia) R Swastedian (Indonesia) N Melati	15	15
3	(Indonesia) R Rivaldy (Indonesia) P H Mentari	21	21

==== Section 4 ====
First Round
(Indonesia) Z J Sumanti (Indonesia) A Wiratama	21	21
(Chinese Taipei) Wu Y-c (Chinese Taipei) Chang H-t	14	15
(Chinese Taipei) Lu C (Chinese Taipei) Lin H-t	15	12
6	(Indonesia) R N Kusharjanto (Indonesia) S F S Ramadhanti	21	21
(Chinese Taipei) Lu C-p (Chinese Taipei) Yang C-t	18	16
(Indonesia) A P Rahmanto (Indonesia) D T Permatasari	21	21
(Indonesia) Y Rambitan (Indonesia) N V Marwah	21	15	14
2	(Chinese Taipei) Chang K-c (Chinese Taipei) Cheng C-y	15	21	21

Second Round
(Indonesia) Z J Sumanti (Indonesia) A Wiratama	23	21
6	(Indonesia) R N Kusharjanto (Indonesia) S F S Ramadhanti	21	12
(Indonesia) A P Rahmanto (Indonesia) D T Permatasari	14	14
2	(Chinese Taipei) Chang K-c (Chinese Taipei) Cheng C-y	21	21

Quarter-finals
(Indonesia) Z J Sumanti (Indonesia) A Wiratama	20	12
2	(Chinese Taipei) Chang K-c (Chinese Taipei) Cheng C-y	22	21

Preceded by Debut year	Indonesia Masters Super 100	Succeeded by 2019 Indonesia Masters Super 100
Preceded by 2018 China Open	BWF World Tour; 2018 BWF season	Succeeded by 2018 Korea Open
