= 2018 Akita Masters =

Tournament details
- Dates: 24–29 July
- Level: Super 100
- Total prize money: US$75,000
- Venue: CNA Arena Akita
- Location: Akita, Akita Prefecture, Japan

Champions
- Men's singles: (Thailand) Sitthikom Thammasin
- Women's singles: (Japan) Sayaka Takahashi
- Men's doubles: (Indonesia) Akbar Bintang Cahyono (Indonesia) Muhammad Reza Pahlevi Isfahani
- Women's doubles: (Japan) Ayako Sakuramoto (Japan) Yukiko Takahata
- Mixed doubles: (Japan) Kohei Gondo (Japan) Ayane Kurihara

The 2018 Akita Masters (officially known as the Yonex Akita Masters 2018 for sponsorship reasons) was a badminton tournament which took place at CNA Arena Akita in Japan from 24 to 29 July 2018 and had a total purse of $75,000.

== Tournament ==
The 2018 Akita Masters was the fourth Super 100 tournament of the 2018 BWF World Tour and also part of the Akita Masters championships, which was held for the first time. This tournament was organized by the Nippon Badminton Association with the sanction from the BWF.

=== Venue ===
This international tournament was held at CNA Arena Akita in Akita, Akita Prefecture, Japan.

=== Point distribution ===
Below is the point distribution table for each phase of the tournament based on the BWF points system for BWF Tour Super 100 events.

Winner	Runner-up	3/4	5/8	9/16	17/32	33/64
5,500	4,680	3,850	3,030	2,110	1,290	510

=== Prize money ===
The total prize money for this year's tournament was US$75,000. Distribution of prize money was in accordance with BWF regulations.

Event	Winner	Finals	Semi-finals	Quarter-finals	Last 16
Singles	$5,625	$2,850	$1,087.50	$450	$262.50
Doubles	$5,925	$2,850	$1,050	$543.75	$281.25

== Men's singles ==
=== Seeds ===
1. (Japan) Kanta Tsuneyama (withdrew)
2. (Indonesia) Ihsan Maulana Mustofa (final)
3. (China) Lu Guangzu (second round)
4. (Chinese Taipei) Lin Yu-hsien (second round)
5. (Denmark) Jan Ø. Jørgensen (semi-finals)
6. (Indonesia) Panji Ahmad Maulana (third round)
7. (Japan) Yu Igarashi (semi-finals)
8. (Thailand) Sitthikom Thammasin (champion)

=== Finals ===
Semi-finals
8	(Thailand) Sitthikom Thammasin	23	21
5	(Denmark) Jan Ø. Jørgensen	21	16
7	(Japan) Yu Igarashi	21	14	15
2	(Indonesia) Ihsan Maulana Mustofa	14	21	21

Final
8	(Thailand) Sitthikom Thammasin	21	21
2	(Indonesia) Ihsan Maulana Mustofa	10	13

=== Top half ===
==== Section 1 ====
First Round
(Hong Kong) Chan Y C	21	12	15
(Chinese Taipei) Lu C-h	16	21	21
(Japan) K Naraoka	21	21
(Australia) P S Low	13	15
(Chinese Taipei) Hu C-e	8	7
(Indonesia) F A Kholik	21	21

Second Round
1	(Japan) K Tsuneyama
(Indonesia) Y F Mainaky	w	/	o
(Chinese Taipei) Lee C-h	21	21
(Chinese Taipei) Lu C-h	8	14
8	(Thailand) S Thammasin	21	21
(Japan) K Naraoka	8	15
(Mongolia) B Munkhbat	6	12
(Indonesia) F A Kholik	21	21

Third Round
(Indonesia) Y F Mainaky	13	3
(Chinese Taipei) Lee C-h	21	21
8	(Thailand) S Thammasin	13	21	21
(Indonesia) F A Kholik	21	15	16

Quarter-finals
(Chinese Taipei) Lee C-h	16	16
8	(Thailand) S Thammasin	21	21

==== Section 2 ====
First Round
(Indonesia) C A D Wardoyo	21	21
(Japan) Y Baba	11	17
(South Korea) Son S-h	22	11	22
(Thailand) K Leelavechabutr	20	21	20
(Chinese Taipei) Hsueh H-y	21	21
(South Korea) Kim D-h	14	19
(Chinese Taipei) Chi Y-j	9	19
(Japan) R Takeshita	21	21

Second Round
4	(Chinese Taipei) Lin Y-h	20	20
(Indonesia) C A D Wardoyo	22	22
(Indonesia) A Susanto	12	11
(South Korea) Son S-h	21	21
5	(Denmark) J Ø. Jørgensen	21	18	21
(Chinese Taipei) Hsueh H-y	19	21	17
(Chinese Taipei) Lin C-y	13	14
(Japan) R Takeshita	21	21

Third Round
(Indonesia) C A D Wardoyo	21	21
(South Korea) Son S-h	19	17
5	(Denmark) J Ø. Jørgensen	16	21	21
(Japan) R Takeshita	21	14	14

Quarter-finals
(Indonesia) C A D Wardoyo	19	21	8
5	(Denmark) J Ø. Jørgensen	21	19	21

=== Bottom half ===
==== Section 3 ====
First Round
(Indonesia) M B Pangisthu	17	16
(Japan) H Shimono	21	21
(Japan) N Matsukawa	21	21
(Indonesia) V A Saputra	12	10
(China) Wu SJ	21	7	15
(Japan) M Koga	13	21	21
(Japan) N Yamazawa	21	15	16
(Denmark) K Bruun	19	21	21

Second Round
(Japan) H Shimono	18	21	21
(Nepal) R Tamang	21	17	10
(Japan) N Matsukawa	20	18
7	(Japan) Y Igarashi	22	21
(Japan) M Koga	21	23
(Canada) J Ho-shue	17	21
(Denmark) K Bruun	17	21	21
3	(China) Lu GZ	21	16	11

Third Round
(Japan) H Shimono	19	23
7	(Japan) Y Igarashi	21	25
(Japan) M Koga	21	21
(Denmark) K Bruun	13	18

Quarter-finals
7	(Japan) Y Igarashi	21	19	21
(Japan) M Koga	18	21	19

==== Section 4 ====
First Round
(Chinese Taipei) Yang C-c	21	21
(Japan) T Obayashi	11	18
(Chinese Taipei) Shih K-c	21	21	21
(Thailand) A Namkul	10	23	12
(China) Xu YM	21	17	24
(South Korea) Lee Y-k	18	21	22

Second Round
(Chinese Taipei) Yang C-c	21	21
(Chinese Taipei) Chen C-w	18	18
(Chinese Taipei) Shih K-c	14	26
6	(Indonesia) P A Maulana	21	28
(China) Xu YM	13	14
(Japan) T Ueda	21	21
(Nepal) N Shrestha	21	8	15
2	(Indonesia) I M Mustofa	19	21	21

Third Round
(Chinese Taipei) Yang C-c	17	21	21
6	(Indonesia) P A Maulana	21	18	17
(Japan) T Ueda	13	18
2	(Indonesia) I M Mustofa	21	21

Quarter-finals
(Chinese Taipei) Yang C-c	16	22
2	(Indonesia) I M Mustofa	21	24

== Women's singles ==
=== Seeds ===
1. (Japan) Sayaka Takahashi (champion)
2. (Japan) Minatsu Mitani (second round)
3. (Chinese Taipei) Sung Shuo-yun (first round)
4. (Japan) Saena Kawakami (quarter-finals)
5. (Canada) Brittney Tam (first round)
6. (Indonesia) Lyanny Alessandra Mainaky (first round)
7. (Japan) Shiori Saito (quarter-finals)
8. (Japan) Haruko Suzuki (second round)

=== Finals ===
Semi-finals
1	(Japan) Sayaka Takahashi	21	21
(Japan) Ayumi Mine	11	12
Q3	(Japan) Mako Urushizaki	21	17	21
(Thailand) Porntip Buranaprasertsuk	15	21	11

Final
1	(Japan) Sayaka Takahashi	21	13	21
Q3	(Japan) Mako Urushizaki	11	21	18

=== Top half ===
==== Section 1 ====
First Round
1	(Japan) S Takahashi	21	21
(South Korea) Sim Y-j	16	8
(Japan) N Shimoda	16	19
Q1	(Indonesia) Choirunnisa	21	21
8	(Japan) H Suzuki	21	21
(Chinese Taipei) Chang Y-l	11	11
(Thailand) P Chaiwan	19	18
(Japan) Y Hashimoto	21	21

Second Round
1	(Japan) S Takahashi	21	21
Q1	(Indonesia) Choirunnisa	14	11
8	(Japan) H Suzuki	15	11
(Japan) Y Hashimoto	21	21

Quarter-finals
1	(Japan) S Takahashi	16	21	21
(Japan) Y Hashimoto	21	19	14

==== Section 2 ====
First Round
3	(Chinese Taipei) Sung S-y	13	9
(Japan) Y Nakai	21	21
(Thailand) N Aimsaard	9	18
(Japan) A Mine	21	21
5	(Canada) B Tam	14	11
Q2	(Indonesia) B S Rahayu	21	21
(Japan) Y Nakamura	20	14
(Chinese Taipei) Lin H-t	22	21

Second Round
(Japan) Y Nakai	20	9
(Japan) A Mine	22	21
Q2	(Indonesia) B S Rahayu	21	12	21
(Chinese Taipei) Lin H-t	19	21	19

Quarter-finals
(Japan) A Mine	21	21
Q2	(Indonesia) B S Rahayu	8	15

=== Bottom half ===
==== Section 3 ====
First Round
(Chinese Taipei) Liang T-y	21	17	19
Q3	(Japan) M Urushizaki	18	21	21
(Chinese Taipei) Lin Y-c	23	21
6	(Indonesia) L A Mainaky	21	15
Q4	(China) Hui XR	19	20
(Thailand) S Katethong	21	22
(Thailand) T Poopradubsil	17	15
4	(Japan) S Kawakami	21	21

Second Round
Q3	(Japan) M Urushizaki	14	21	21
(Chinese Taipei) Lin Y-c	21	8	15
(Thailand) S Katethong	21	14	19
4	(Japan) S Kawakami	16	21	21

Quarter-finals
Q3	(Japan) M Urushizaki	20	21	22
4	(Japan) S Kawakami	22	19	20

==== Section 4 ====
First Round
(Japan) A Takahashi	18	21	20
(Thailand) C Jucharoen	21	16	22
(United States) J Gai	8	5
7	(Japan) S Saito	21	21
(Thailand) P Buranaprasertsuk	21	21
(South Korea) Kim G-e	15	18
(Thailand) B Aimsaard	11	9
2	(Japan) M Mitani	21	21

Second Round
(Thailand) C Jucharoen	16	15
7	(Japan) S Saito	21	21
(Thailand) P Buranaprasertsuk	22	21
2	(Japan) M Mitani	20	14

Quarter-finals
7	(Japan) S Saito	15	23	14
(Thailand) P Buranaprasertsuk	21	21	21

== Men's doubles ==
=== Seeds ===
1. (Canada) Jason Ho-shue / Nyl Yakura (second round)
2. (Thailand) Inkarat Apisuk / Tanupat Viriyangkura (semi-finals)
3. (Indonesia) Sabar Karyaman Gutama / Frengky Wijaya Putra (withdrew)
4. (Chinese Taipei) Po Li-wei / Yang Ming-tse (second round)

=== Finals ===
Semi-finals
(Chinese Taipei) Lee Sheng-mu (Chinese Taipei) Lin Chia-yu	17	14
(Indonesia) Akbar Bintang Cahyono (Indonesia) Muhammad Reza Pahlevi Isfahani	21	21
(Japan) Hirokatsu Hashimoto (Japan) Hiroyuki Saeki	21	21
2	(Thailand) Inkarat Apisuk (Thailand) Tanupat Viriyangkura	18	19

Final
(Indonesia) Akbar Bintang Cahyono (Indonesia) Muhammad Reza Pahlevi Isfahani	21	21
(Japan) Hirokatsu Hashimoto (Japan) Hiroyuki Saeki	16	6

=== Top half ===
==== Section 1 ====
First Round
(Japan) A Koga (Japan) T Saito	21	21
(China) Jin YL (China) Tang YZ	5	19
(Nepal) N Shrestha (Nepal) R Tamang	11	15
(Thailand) N Phuangphuapet (Thailand) N Yordphaisong	21	21
(Japan) S Hoshino (Japan) Y Nishikawa	15	14
(Chinese Taipei) Lee S-m (Chinese Taipei) Lin C-y	21	21

Second Round
1	(Canada) J Ho-shue (Canada) N Yakura	9	15
(Japan) A Koga (Japan) T Saito	21	21
(Thailand) N Phuangphuapet (Thailand) N Yordphaisong	15	19
(Chinese Taipei) Lee S-m (Chinese Taipei) Lin C-y	21	21

Quarter-finals
(Japan) A Koga (Japan) T Saito	17	21	20
(Chinese Taipei) Lee S-m (Chinese Taipei) Lin C-y	21	16	22

==== Section 2 ====
First Round
(Indonesia) A B Cahyono (Indonesia) M R P Isfahani	21	21
(Chinese Taipei) Hu C-e (Chinese Taipei) Lin C-y	7	14
(Japan) H Okamura (Japan) M Onodera	23	21
(Chinese Taipei) Lee F-c (Chinese Taipei) Lee F-j	21	19
(Chinese Taipei) Lin S-c (Chinese Taipei) Yang P-h	18	17
(Singapore) D B Chrisnanta (Singapore) T Hee	21	21

Second Round
4	(Chinese Taipei) Po L-w (Chinese Taipei) Yang M-t	19	15
(Indonesia) A B Cahyono (Indonesia) M R P Isfahani	21	21
(Japan) H Okamura (Japan) M Onodera	15	17
(Singapore) D B Chrisnanta (Singapore) T Hee	21	21

Quarter-finals
(Indonesia) A B Cahyono (Indonesia) M R P Isfahani	21	21
(Singapore) D B Chrisnanta (Singapore) T Hee	16	16

=== Bottom half ===
==== Section 3 ====
First Round
(South Korea) Jung J-w (South Korea) Kim H-t	4
(Japan) M Kaneko (Japan) Y Kubota	1^{r}
(Japan) H Hashimoto (Japan) H Saeki	21	19	24
(Malaysia) Tan B H (South Korea) Yoo Y-s	16	21	22
(Chinese Taipei) Lu C-h (Chinese Taipei) Shih K-c	13	19
(China) Li JQ (China) Liu ZR	21	21

Second Round
(South Korea) Jung J-w (South Korea) Kim H-t	17	14
(Japan) H Hashimoto (Japan) H Saeki	21	21
(China) Li JQ (China) Liu ZR	w	/	o
3	(Indonesia) S K Gutama (Indonesia) F W Putra

Quarter-finals
(Japan) H Hashimoto (Japan) H Saeki	21	24
(China) Li JQ (China) Liu ZR	6	22

==== Section 4 ====
First Round
(Japan) K Tamate (Japan) K Yamashita	21	21
(Chinese Taipei) Lin S-k (Chinese Taipei) Tseng M-h	15	19
(Japan) K Ichikawa (Japan) D Umayahara	17	18
(Chinese Taipei) Lin Y-s (Chinese Taipei) Su L-w	21	21
(Chinese Taipei) Chang K-c (Chinese Taipei) Lin Y-h	20	23	21
(China) Cai RQ (China) Zhang SJ	22	21	23

Second Round
(Japan) K Tamate (Japan) K Yamashita	21	23
(Chinese Taipei) Lin Y-s (Chinese Taipei) Su L-w	19	21
(China) Cai RQ (China) Zhang SJ	12	15
2	(Thailand) I Apisuk (Thailand) T Viriyangkura	21	21

Quarter-finals
(Japan) K Tamate (Japan) K Yamashita	10	19
2	(Thailand) I Apisuk (Thailand) T Viriyangkura	21	21

== Women's doubles ==
=== Seeds ===
1. (Japan) Naoko Fukuman / Kurumi Yonao (quarter-finals)
2. (Japan) Ayako Sakuramoto / Yukiko Takahata (champions)
3. (Thailand) Savitree Amitrapai / Pacharapun Chochuwong (second round)
4. (Japan) Misato Aratama / Akane Watanabe (second round)

=== Finals ===
Semi-finals
(Japan) Nami Matsuyama (Japan) Chiharu Shida	21	21
(Japan) Asumi Kugo (Japan) Megumi Yokoyama	17	18
(South Korea) Kim Hye-jeong (South Korea) Kim So-yeong	18	22
2	(Japan) Ayako Sakuramoto (Japan) Yukiko Takahata	21	24

Final
(Japan) Nami Matsuyama (Japan) Chiharu Shida	21	11
2	(Japan) Ayako Sakuramoto (Japan) Yukiko Takahata	23	21

=== Top half ===
==== Section 1 ====
First Round
(Chinese Taipei) Kuo Y-w (Chinese Taipei) Lin W-c	14	18
(Japan) S Hobara (Japan) N Sone	21	21
(Japan) N Matsuyama (Japan) C Shida	21	22
(Singapore) Citra P S D (Singapore) Jin YJ	18	20
(Japan) R Eto (Japan) A Matsuda	21	21
(Chinese Taipei) Chang C-h (Chinese Taipei) Yang C-t	10	16

Second Round
1	(Japan) N Fukuman (Japan) K Yonao	21	21
(Japan) S Hobara (Japan) N Sone	6	17
(Japan) N Matsuyama (Japan) C Shida	21	21
(Japan) R Eto (Japan) A Matsuda	12	15

Quarter-finals
1	(Japan) N Fukuman (Japan) K Yonao	15	23
(Japan) N Matsuyama (Japan) C Shida	21	25

==== Section 2 ====
First Round
(Japan) M Kashihara (Japan) M Kato	18	21	21
(China) Chen S (China) Shen YB	21	7	7
(Chinese Taipei) Chang H-t (Chinese Taipei) Yu C-h	11	13
(Japan) A Kugo (Japan) M Yokoyama	21	21
(China) Guo YX (China) Zhou SQ	15	21	21
(Indonesia) W O Kandow (Indonesia) A Wiratama	21	16	10

Second Round
3	(Thailand) S Amitrapai (Thailand) P Chochuwong	20	18
(Japan) M Kashihara (Japan) M Kato	22	21
(Japan) A Kugo (Japan) M Yokoyama	21	21
(China) Guo YX (China) Zhou SQ	15	16

Quarter-finals
(Japan) M Kashihara (Japan) M Kato	21	18	13
(Japan) A Kugo (Japan) M Yokoyama	17	21	21

=== Bottom half ===
==== Section 3 ====
First Round
(China) Wang XW (China) Wang ZX	13	9
(Japan) E Honda (Japan) N Shimizu	21	21
(Japan) R Kawashima (Japan) S Ozaki	21	20	14
(Chinese Taipei) Chen H-h (Chinese Taipei) Hu L-f	14	22	21
(Thailand) R Laisuan (Thailand) S Mingchua	12	14
(South Korea) Kim H-j (South Korea) Kim S-y	21	21

Second Round
(Japan) E Honda (Japan) N Shimizu	19	14
(Chinese Taipei) Chen H-h (Chinese Taipei) Hu L-f	21	21
(South Korea) Kim H-j (South Korea) Kim S-y	21	21
4	(Japan) M Aratama (Japan) A Watanabe	18	14

Quarter-finals
(Chinese Taipei) Chen H-h (Chinese Taipei) Hu L-f	14	19
(South Korea) Kim H-j (South Korea) Kim S-y	21	21

==== Section 4 ====
First Round
(Japan) R Iwanaga (Japan) Y Suizu	21	21
(Thailand) B Aimsaard (Thailand) N Aimsaard	19	11
(Japan) Y Nakai (Japan) N Ono	21	21
(Chinese Taipei) Cheng Y-c (Chinese Taipei) Hsieh P-s	18	17
(Japan) M Fujii (Japan) R Kakiiwa
(Chinese Taipei) Cheng C-y (Chinese Taipei) Sung S-y	w	/	o

Second Round
(Japan) R Iwanaga (Japan) Y Suizu	21	22
(Japan) Y Nakai (Japan) N Ono	10	20
(Chinese Taipei) Cheng C-y (Chinese Taipei) Sung S-y	11	15
2	(Japan) A Sakuramoto (Japan) Y Takahata	21	21

Quarter-finals
(Japan) R Iwanaga (Japan) Y Suizu	13	16
2	(Japan) A Sakuramoto (Japan) Y Takahata	21	21

== Mixed doubles ==
=== Seeds ===
1. (Chinese Taipei) Chang Ko-chi / Cheng Chi-ya (semi-finals)
2. (South Korea) Kim Hwi-tae / Kim Hye-jeong (first round)
3. (Indonesia) Akbar Bintang Cahyono / Winny Oktavina Kandow (quarter-finals)
4. (Singapore) Danny Bawa Chrisnanta / Crystal Wong (quarter-finals)

=== Finals ===
Semi-finals
1	(Chinese Taipei) Chang Ko-chi (Chinese Taipei) Cheng Chi-ya	16	21	14
(Indonesia) Alfian Eko Prasetya (Indonesia) Angelica Wiratama	21	17	21
(Indonesia) Rinov Rivaldy (Indonesia) Pitha Haningtyas Mentari	17	21	15
(Japan) Kohei Gondo (Japan) Ayane Kurihara	21	19	21

Final
(Indonesia) Alfian Eko Prasetya (Indonesia) Angelica Wiratama	9	23	17
(Japan) Kohei Gondo (Japan) Ayane Kurihara	21	21	21

=== Top half ===
==== Section 1 ====
First Round
(England) C Hemming (England) F T Liew	12	21	9
(Chinese Taipei) Lin C-y (Chinese Taipei) Lin W-c	21	14	21
(Japan) T Saito (Japan) A Watanabe	20	18
(Chinese Taipei) Tseng M-h (Chinese Taipei) Hsieh P-s	22	21
(Chinese Taipei) Lin S-k (Chinese Taipei) Cheng Y-c	21	21
(Japan) N Ishikawa (Japan) K Kameda	17	12

Second Round
1	(Chinese Taipei) Chang K-c (Chinese Taipei) Cheng C-y	21	21
(Chinese Taipei) Lin C-y (Chinese Taipei) Lin W-c	18	16
(Chinese Taipei) Tseng M-h (Chinese Taipei) Hsieh P-s	21	21
(Chinese Taipei) Lin S-k (Chinese Taipei) Cheng Y-c	19	14

Quarter-finals
1	(Chinese Taipei) Chang K-c (Chinese Taipei) Cheng C-y	21	21
(Chinese Taipei) Tseng M-h (Chinese Taipei) Hsieh P-s	18	11

==== Section 2 ====
First Round
4	(Singapore) D B Chrisnanta (Singapore) C Wong	21	21
(Chinese Taipei) Lee F-c (Chinese Taipei) Yang C-t	17	14
(Japan) K Mitsuhashi (Japan) N Shinoya	21	21
(Chinese Taipei) Lee F-j (Chinese Taipei) Yu C-h	19	14
(China) Chen K (China) Liu L	16	19
(Indonesia) A E Prasetya (Indonesia) A Wiratama	21	21
(Japan) Y Kubota (Japan) C Shida
(Chinese Taipei) Yang P-h (Chinese Taipei) Lin Y-c	w	/	o

Second Round
4	(Singapore) D B Chrisnanta (Singapore) C Wong	21	16	21
(Japan) K Mitsuhashi (Japan) N Shinoya	15	21	14
(Indonesia) A E Prasetya (Indonesia) A Wiratama	21	21
(Chinese Taipei) Yang P-h (Chinese Taipei) Lin Y-c	18	19

Quarter-finals
4	(Singapore) D B Chrisnanta (Singapore) C Wong	14	12
(Indonesia) A E Prasetya (Indonesia) A Wiratama	21	21

=== Bottom half ===
==== Section 3 ====
First Round
(Chinese Taipei) Po L-w (Chinese Taipei) Chang C-h	21	21
(Indonesia) Y F Mainaky (Indonesia) L A Mainaky	15	11
(Indonesia) R Rivaldy (Indonesia) P H Mentari	21	21
(Chinese Taipei) Yang M-t (Chinese Taipei) Sung S-y	11	11
(Singapore) T Hee (Singapore) Citra P S D	21	21
(Chinese Taipei) Chi Y-j (Chinese Taipei) Chen H-h	15	9
(Japan) T Urai (Japan) R Miyaura	15	8
3	(Indonesia) A B Cahyono (Indonesia) W O Kandow	21	21

Second Round
(Chinese Taipei) Po L-w (Chinese Taipei) Chang C-h	22	20
(Indonesia) R Rivaldy (Indonesia) P H Mentari	24	22
(Singapore) T Hee (Singapore) Citra P S D	21	18	17
3	(Indonesia) A B Cahyono (Indonesia) W O Kandow	17	21	21

Quarter-finals
(Indonesia) R Rivaldy (Indonesia) P H Mentari	21	21
3	(Indonesia) A B Cahyono (Indonesia) W O Kandow	14	11

==== Section 4 ====
First Round
(Japan) K Tamate (Japan) M Zaitsu	21	21
(Chinese Taipei) Su L-w (Chinese Taipei) Lin H-t	16	19
(Thailand) N Phuangphuapet (Thailand) S Amitrapai	21	21
(Chinese Taipei) Lin S-c (Chinese Taipei) Kuo Y-w	11	9
(Japan) H Okamura (Japan) Y Takahata	21	21
(Thailand) M Narongrit (Thailand) S Katethong	16	17
(Japan) K Gondo (Japan) A Kurihara	21	21
2	(South Korea) Kim H-t (South Korea) Kim H-j	19	13

Second Round
(Japan) K Tamate (Japan) M Zaitsu	7	17
(Thailand) N Phuangphuapet (Thailand) S Amitrapai	21	21
(Japan) H Okamura (Japan) Y Takahata	19	8
(Japan) K Gondo (Japan) A Kurihara	21	21

Quarter-finals
(Thailand) N Phuangphuapet (Thailand) S Amitrapai	22	17	13
(Japan) K Gondo (Japan) A Kurihara	20	21	21

Preceded by Debut year	Akita Masters	Succeeded by 2019 Akita Masters
Preceded by 2018 Singapore Open	BWF World Tour; 2018 BWF season	Succeeded by 2018 Russian Open
