= Mako Urushizaki =

Personal information
- Born: 19 April 1992 (age 34) Hyōgo Prefecture, Japan
- Height: 1.62 m (5 ft 4 in)
- Weight: 55 kg (121 lb)

Sport
- Country: Japan
- Sport: Badminton
- Handedness: Right
- Retired: 31 March 2022

Women's singles
- Career record: 44 wins, 14 losses (75.86%)
- Highest ranking: 118 (26 March 2019)
- BWF profile

Mako Urushizaki (漆﨑 真子, Urushizaki Mako; born 19 April 1992) is a Japanese former badminton player and current coach. She competed in the women's singles for the San-in Godo Bank corporate team and was a member of the 2019 Japan national B team. During her professional career, Urushizaki won two international titles in 2019—the Swedish Open and the Dubai International—and was a runner-up at the 2018 Akita Masters, a BWF World Tour Super 100 tournament. She retired from her playing career on 31 March 2022, due to an injury. Following her retirement as a player, Urushizaki transitioned to coaching and currently serves as a coach for the Japanese national U-16 team and co-founded the Akua Badminton Club.

== Early life and career ==
Mako Urushizaki was born in Hyogo Prefecture, Japan. She attended Fuji Junior High School and Itami Kita High School. From 2011 to 2015, she studied sports science at the University of Tsukuba. While at the university, she was part of the women's team that won the 2014 All Japan Intercollegiate Championships, and she also placed third in the singles event.

== Career ==
Following her graduation, Urushizaki joined the San-in Godo Bank corporate team in 2015. On the international circuit, she reached her first final in 2016 at the White Nights, finishing as runner-up to Neslihan Yiğit of Turkey. The following year, she was the runner-up at the 2017 Finnish Open, losing to compatriot Shiori Saito. In 2018, Urushizaki was the runner-up at the Akita Masters, a BWF World Tour Super 100 tournament, losing in the final to top-seeded compatriot Sayaka Takahashi.

In 2019, Urushizaki was selected for the Japan B national team. That year, she won her first international title at the Swedish Open in January, defeating Asuka Takahashi. She secured her second title in October at the Dubai International, beating India's Rituparna Das. She achieved her career-high women's singles world ranking of 118 on 26 March 2019.

An injury curtailed her professional career, leading to her retirement at the conclusion of the 2021–2022 season, which was officially announced on 31 March 2022.

== Coaching career ==
After retiring in 2022, Urushizaki pursued a coaching career grounded in academic research. In March 2024, she completed a master's degree at the University of Tsukuba through the National Leading Coach Training Program, where her graduate studies involved research into coaching science. From April 2022 to March 2024, she also served as the head coach for the university's women's badminton team. She coached the team to a national title at the 2023 All Japan Intercollegiate Championships and mentored a player who was selected for the Japan national team.

In 2024, Urushizaki co-founded the Akua Badminton Club to further promote the sport. Concurrently, she was appointed as a coach for the 2025 Japan National U-16 team.

== Achievements ==
=== BWF World Tour (1 runner-up) ===
The BWF World Tour, which was announced on 19 March 2017 and implemented in 2018, is a series of elite badminton tournaments sanctioned by the Badminton World Federation (BWF). The BWF World Tour is divided into levels of World Tour Finals, Super 1000, Super 750, Super 500, Super 300 (part of the HSBC World Tour), and the BWF Tour Super 100.

Women's singles
Year	Tournament	Level	Opponent	Score	Result	Ref.
2018	Akita Masters	Super 100	(Japan) Sayaka Takahashi	11–21, 21–13, 18–21	(silver) Runner-up	

=== BWF International Challenge/Series (2 titles, 2 runners-up) ===
Women's singles
Year	Tournament	Opponent	Score	Result	Ref.
2016	White Nights	(Turkey) Neslihan Yiğit	16–21, 15–21	(silver) Runner-up	
2017	Finnish Open	(Japan) Shiori Saito	8–21, 10–21	(silver) Runner-up	
2019	Swedish Open	(Japan) Asuka Takahashi	23–21, 21–19	(gold) Winner	
2019	Dubai International	(India) Rituparna Das	23–21, 21–17	(gold) Winner	

BWF International Challenge tournament
BWF International Series tournament
