= 2018 Hyderabad Open (badminton) =

Tournament details
- Dates: 4–9 September
- Level: Super 100
- Total prize money: US$75,000
- Venue: G. M. C. Balayogi SATS Indoor Stadium
- Location: Hyderabad, India

Champions
- Men's singles: (India) Sameer Verma
- Women's singles: (South Korea) Kim Ga-eun
- Men's doubles: (India) Satwiksairaj Rankireddy (India) Chirag Shetty
- Women's doubles: (Hong Kong) Ng Tsz Yau (Hong Kong) Yuen Sin Ying
- Mixed doubles: (Indonesia) Akbar Bintang Cahyono (Indonesia) Winny Oktavina Kandow

The 2018 Hyderabad Open (officially known as the IDBI Federal Life Insurance Hyderabad Open 2018 for sponsorship reasons) was a badminton tournament which took place at G. M. C. Balayogi SATS Indoor Stadium in Hyderabad, India from 4 to 9 September 2018 and had a total purse of $75,000.

== Tournament ==
The 2018 Hyderabad Open was the seventh Super 100 tournament of the 2018 BWF World Tour and also part of the Hyderabad Open championships, which was held for the first time. This tournament was organized by the Badminton Association of India with the sanction from the BWF.

=== Venue ===
This international tournament was held at G. M. C. Balayogi SATS Indoor Stadium in Hyderabad, Telangana, India.

=== Point distribution ===
Below is the point distribution table for each phase of the tournament based on the BWF points system for the BWF Tour Super 100 event.

Winner	Runner-up	3/4	5/8	9/16	17/32	33/64	65/128	129/256
5,500	4,680	3,850	3,030	2,110	1,290	510	240	100

=== Prize money ===
The total prize money for this tournament was US$75,000. Distribution of prize money was in accordance with BWF regulations.

Event	Winner	Finals	Semi-finals	Quarter-finals	Last 16
Singles	$5,625	$2,850	$1,087.50	$450	$262.50
Doubles	$5,925	$2,850	$1,050	$543.75	$281.25

== Men's singles ==
=== Seeds ===
1. (India) Sameer Verma (champion)
2. (India) B. Sai Praneeth (second round)
3. (Israel) Misha Zilberman (second round)
4. (India) Parupalli Kashyap (second round)
5. (India) Sourabh Verma (third round)
6. (Indonesia) Panji Ahmad Maulana (second round)
7. (Indonesia) Firman Abdul Kholik (semi-finals)
8. (South Korea) Heo Kwang-hee (quarter-finals)

=== Finals ===
Semi-finals
1	(India) Sameer Verma	16	21	21
(India) R. M. V. Gurusaidutt	21	15	11
7	(Indonesia) Firman Abdul Kholik	17	14
(Malaysia) Soong Joo Ven	21	21

Final
1	(India) Sameer Verma	21	21
(Malaysia) Soong Joo Ven	15	18

=== Top half ===
==== Section 1 ====
First Round
(India) S Pratap Singh	8	16
Q4	(India) A Das Gupta	21	21
Q3	(India) M Mohammed	21	21
(India) A Joshi	10	11
(South Korea) Lee Y-g	21	21
(India) K Jindal	15	14
(India) P Joshi	24	22
(Singapore) R Ng Z R	22	20

Second Round
1	(India) Sa Verma	21	21
Q4	(India) A Das Gupta	16	16
(India) K A Walter	16	21	21
Q3	(India) M Mohammed	21	13	18
5	(India) So Verma	21	22
(South Korea) Lee Y-g	12	20
(India) A Tandon	21	15	16
(India) P Joshi	16	21	21

Third Round
1	(India) Sa Verma	21	21
(India) K A Walter	14	9
5	(India) So Verma	21	13	19
(India) P Joshi	14	21	21

Quarter-finals
1	(India) Sa Verma	16	26	21
(India) P Joshi	21	24	7

==== Section 2 ====
First Round
(Indonesia) G P F Cupu	21	18	18
(India) R. M. V. Gurusaidutt	13	21	21
(India) H Aggarwal	21	21
(Indonesia) Y F Mainaky	5	10
(Malaysia) Goh G C	22	19	21
(India) S Thakur	20	21	18
(India) S Jaiswal	21	11	16
Q1	(India) A Mishra	15	21	21

Second Round
3	(Israel) M Zilberman	11	14
(India) R. M. V. Gurusaidutt	21	21
(India) D S. Farid	21	21
(India) H Aggarwal	19	18
6	(Indonesia) P A Maulana	19	18
(Malaysia) Goh G C	21	21
(Malaysia) Lim C W	21	21
Q1	(India) A Mishra	18	13

Third Round
(India) R. M. V. Gurusaidutt	21	21
(India) D S. Farid	14	13
(Malaysia) Goh G C
(Malaysia) Lim C W	w	/	o

Quarter-finals
(India) R. M. V. Gurusaidutt	13	22	21
(Malaysia) Lim C W	21	20	11

=== Bottom half ===
==== Section 3 ====
First Round
Q7	(India) B Kajla	17	11
(India) Si Verma	21	21
(India) K Gulshan Kumar	21	21
PFQ	(India) Kanishq M	15	12
Q8	(India) K Dharmamer	21	21
(India) A Yeligar	15	13
(Indonesia) V A Saputra	21	21
(India) A Jayaram	19	17

Second Round
(India) Si Verma	15	21	11
(India) C Sen	21	19	21
(India) K Gulshan Kumar	17	7
7	(Indonesia) F A Kholik	21	21
Q8	(India) K Dharmamer	21	21
Q5	(India) L Pokuri	16	19
(Indonesia) V A Saputra	2
4	(India) P Kashyap	0^{r}

Third Round
(India) C Sen	16	18
7	(Indonesia) F A Kholik	21	21
Q8	(India) K Dharmamer	16	18
(Indonesia) V A Saputra	21	21

Quarter-finals
7	(Indonesia) F A Kholik	18	21	21
(Indonesia) V A Saputra	21	15	14

==== Section 4 ====
First Round
Q2	(Indonesia) I Rumbay	17	21	21
(India) R Y Chottaboina	21	11	10
Q6	(India) H M. Gowda	21	10	6
(India) L Sen	13	21	21
(Malaysia) Soong J V	21	21
(India) B Joshi	15	14
(India) A George	10	12
(Indonesia) C A Dwi Wardoyo	21	21

Second Round
Q2	(Indonesia) I Rumbay	18	21	21
(India) H Dani	21	16	13
(India) L Sen	13	12
8	(South Korea) Heo K-h	21	21
(Malaysia) Soong J V	21	21
(India) M Manjunath	13	18
(Indonesia) C A Dwi Wardoyo	13	22	21
2	(India) B. Sai Praneeth	21	20	12

Third Round
Q2	(Indonesia) I Rumbay	13	21	18
8	(South Korea) Heo K-h	21	17	21
(Malaysia) Soong J V	21	21
(Indonesia) C A Dwi Wardoyo	14	13

Quarter-finals
8	(South Korea) Heo K-h	21	22	22
(Malaysia) Soong J V	19	24	24

== Women's singles ==
=== Seeds ===
1. (Indonesia) Dinar Dyah Ayustine (second round)
2. (Indonesia) Lyanny Alessandra Mainaky (first round)
3. (Canada) Brittney Tam (second round)
4. (Hong Kong) Deng Xuan (final)
5. (India) Sri Krishna Priya Kudaravalli (quarter-finals)
6. (Indonesia) Ruselli Hartawan (second round)
7. (India) Ruthvika Shivani Gadde (first round)
8. (India) Mugdha Agrey (first round)

=== Finals ===
Semi-finals
(Singapore) Yeo Jia Min	7	14
4	(Hong Kong) Deng Xuan	21	21
(South Korea) Kim Ga-eun	21	17	21
(South Korea) Sim Yu-jin	13	21	15

Final
4	(Hong Kong) Deng Xuan	9	21	17
(South Korea) Kim Ga-eun	21	18	21

=== Top half ===
==== Section 1 ====
First Round
1	(Indonesia) D D Ayustine	21	12	21
(India) S U R Chukka	7	21	18
(Singapore) Yeo J M	21	21
(India) R Das	13	11
5	(India) S K P Kudaravalli	12	21	21
Q1	(India) S Singhi	21	16	14
(Thailand) N Aimsaard	15	23	21
(India) S Mundada	21	21	18

Second Round
1	(Indonesia) D D Ayustine	15	15
(Singapore) Yeo J M	21	21
5	(India) S K P Kudaravalli	21	21
(Thailand) N Aimsaard	15	18

Quarter-finals
(Singapore) Yeo J M	21	21
5	(India) S K P Kudaravalli	12	12

==== Section 2 ====
First Round
4	(Hong Kong) Deng X	21	21
(India) S Pardeshi	16	12
(India) S Gauram	18	21	13
Q4	(Indonesia) Choirunnisa	21	17	21
7	(India) R S Gadde	1^{r}
(Thailand) B Aimsaard	1
(India) I Sharma	5	12
(United States) I Wang	21	21

Second Round
4	(Hong Kong) Deng X	19	21	21
Q4	(Indonesia) Choirunnisa	21	11	13
(Thailand) B Aimsaard	13	7
(United States) I Wang	21	21

Quarter-finals
4	(Hong Kong) Deng X	15	21	21
(United States) I Wang	21	10	15

=== Bottom half ===
==== Section 3 ====
First Round
(Indonesia) A O Winata	21	5	20
(South Korea) Kim G-e	18	21	22
(India) V Choudhari	13	14
6	(Indonesia) R Hartawan	21	21
(India) R Mookerjee	13	10
Q2	(South Korea) An S-y	21	21
(India) S Toshniwal	11	18
3	(Canada) B Tam	21	21

Second Round
(South Korea) Kim G-e	21	21
6	(Indonesia) R Hartawan	12	14
Q2	(South Korea) An S-y	21	21
3	(Canada) B Tam	5	12

Quarter-finals
(South Korea) Kim G-e	21	18	21
Q2	(South Korea) An S-y	12	21	19

==== Section 4 ====
First Round
(India) A Prabhudesai	12	14
(South Korea) Sim Y-j	21	21
Q3	(India) A Kashyap	21	23
8	(India) M Agrey	14	21
PFQ	(Hong Kong) Cheung Y M	21	21
(India) R Karthik	15	8
(India) R Raje	21	21
2	(Indonesia) L A Mainaky	19	15

Second Round
(South Korea) Sim Y-j	21	21
Q3	(India) A Kashyap	9	7
PFQ	(Hong Kong) Cheung Y M	19	16
(India) R Raje	21	21

Quarter-finals
(South Korea) Sim Y-j	21	21
(India) R Raje	19	8

== Men's doubles ==
=== Seeds ===
1. (India) Satwiksairaj Rankireddy / Chirag Shetty (champions)
2. (India) Arjun M.R. / Ramchandran Shlok (quarter-finals)
3. (Indonesia) Akbar Bintang Cahyono / Muhammad Reza Pahlevi Isfahani (final)
4. (India) Arun George / Sanyam Shukla (semi-finals)
5. (Malaysia) Mohamad Arif Abdul Latif / Nur Mohd Azriyn Ayub (semi-finals)
6. (India) Tarun Kona / (Malaysia) Lim Khim Wah (quarter-finals)
7. (India) M. Anilkumar Raju / Venkat Gaurav Prasad (first round)
8. (Thailand) Pakin Kuna-Anuvit / Natthapat Trinkajee (quarter-finals)

=== Finals ===
Semi-finals
1	(India) Satwiksairaj Rankireddy (India) Chirag Shetty	21	21
4	(India) Arun George (India) Sanyam Shukla	14	6
3	(Indonesia) Akbar Bintang Cahyono (Indonesia) Muhammad Reza Pahlevi Isfahani	21	15
5	(Malaysia) Mohamad Arif Abdul Latif (Malaysia) Nur Mohd Azriyn Ayub	14	10^{r}

Final
1	(India) Satwiksairaj Rankireddy (India) Chirag Shetty	21	21
3	(Indonesia) Akbar Bintang Cahyono (Indonesia) Muhammad Reza Pahlevi Isfahani	16	14

=== Top half ===
==== Section 1 ====
First Round
1	(India) S Rankireddy (India) C Shetty	21	19	21
(India) N Kidambi (India) G Shaik	17	21	6
(India) R Kapoor (India) S Sharma	16	18
(Indonesia) B Maulana (Indonesia) F W Putra	21	21
6	(India) T Kona (Malaysia) Lim K W	21	21
(India) Siddharth. (India) V Chawat	6	14
(India) P S Chouhan (India) R Raturi	6	11
(Thailand) S Jomkoh (Thailand) W Sothon	21	21

Second Round
1	(India) S Rankireddy (India) C Shetty	21	21
(Indonesia) B Maulana (Indonesia) F W Putra	13	17
6	(India) T Kona (Malaysia) Lim K W	21	24	22
(Thailand) S Jomkoh (Thailand) W Sothon	23	22	20

Quarter-finals
1	(India) S Rankireddy (India) C Shetty	21	21
6	(India) T Kona (Malaysia) Lim K W	13	10

==== Section 2 ====
First Round
4	(India) A George (India) S Shukla	21	21
(Hong Kong) Chung Y (Hong Kong) Tam C H	14	11
(India) K P Garaga (India) D Kapila	18	21	21
Q2	(India) R Mohamed Rehan (India) V Vasudevan	21	13	12
7	(India) A R Mandiraju (India) V G Prasad	17	22	14
(Hong Kong) Lam W L (Hong Kong) Li K H	21	20	21
(India) S V Gude (India) Q M Mohammed	15	12
Q3	(Hong Kong) Chan T K (Hong Kong) Yeung S C	21	21

Second Round
4	(India) A George (India) S Shukla	21	21
(India) K P Garaga (India) D Kapila	16	18
(Hong Kong) Lam W L (Hong Kong) Li K H	15	17
Q3	(Hong Kong) Chan T K (Hong Kong) Yeung S C	21	21

Quarter-finals
4	(India) A George (India) S Shukla	21	21
Q3	(Hong Kong) Chan T K (Hong Kong) Yeung S C	17	15

=== Bottom half ===
==== Section 3 ====
First Round
(India) K Chahal (India) A Ola	6	14
Q1	(India) M S Khwairakpam (India) D S Konthoujam	21	21
(India) P Chaturvedi (India) C Tripathi	9	12
8	(Thailand) P Kuna-Anuvit (Thailand) N Trinkajee	21	21
(India) Vaibhaav. (India) P Raj	15	14
Q4	(India) V V G Panjala (India) S S K Podile	21	21
(India) U Arora (India) V Devlekar	20	12
3	(Indonesia) A B Cahyono (Indonesia) M R P Isfahani	22	21

Second Round
Q1	(India) M S Khwairakpam (India) D S Konthoujam	14	23	10
8	(Thailand) P Kuna-Anuvit (Thailand) N Trinkajee	21	21	21
Q4	(India) V V G Panjala (India) S S K Podile	10	15
3	(Indonesia) A B Cahyono (Indonesia) M R P Isfahani	21	21

Quarter-finals
8	(Thailand) P Kuna-Anuvit (Thailand) N Trinkajee	11	13
3	(Indonesia) A B Cahyono (Indonesia) M R P Isfahani	21	21

==== Section 4 ====
First Round
(India) P Malik (India) A Nair	14	13
(Hong Kong) Ho W L (Hong Kong) Mak H C	21	21
(India) K Chaudhary (India) B Yadav	17	22
5	(Malaysia) M A A Latif (Malaysia) N M A Ayub	21	24
(Hong Kong) Chang T C (Hong Kong) Yeung M N	21	21
(India) V K Hanumaiah Raganatha (India) A Surya	16	15
PFQ	(India) H Kiran Chereddi (India) K. Ajay Kumar	6	9
2	(India) Arjun M.R. (India) R Shlok	21	21

Second Round
(Hong Kong) Ho W L (Hong Kong) Mak H C	14	20
5	(Malaysia) M A A Latif (Malaysia) N M A Ayub	21	22
(Hong Kong) Chang T C (Hong Kong) Yeung M N	16	14
2	(India) Arjun M.R. (India) R Shlok	21	21

Quarter-finals
5	(Malaysia) M A A Latif (Malaysia) N M A Ayub	21	21
2	(India) Arjun M.R. (India) R Shlok	12	19

== Women's doubles ==
=== Seeds ===
1. (India) Ashwini Ponnappa / N. Sikki Reddy (withdrew)
2. (India) Meghana Jakkampudi / Poorvisha S. Ram (second round)
3. (Indonesia) Agatha Imanuella / Siti Fadia Silva Ramadhanti (semi-finals)
4. (Hong Kong) Ng Wing Yung / Yeung Nga Ting (second round)
5. (Hong Kong) Ng Tsz Yau / Yuen Sin Ying (champions)
6. (Indonesia) Yulfira Barkah / Jauza Fadhila Sugiarto (semi-finals)
7. (India) Aparna Balan / Sruthi K. P. (second round)
8. (India) Harika Veludurthi / Karishma Wadkar (first round)

=== Finals ===
Semi-finals
5	(Hong Kong) Ng Tsz Yau (Hong Kong) Yuen Sin Ying	16	21	21
3	(Indonesia) Agatha Imanuela (Indonesia) Siti Fadia Silva Ramadhanti	21	14	19
(Malaysia) Vivian Hoo (Malaysia) Yap Cheng Wen	16	21	21
6	(Indonesia) Yulfira Barkah (Indonesia) Jauza Fadhila Sugiarto	21	11	14

Final
5	(Hong Kong) Ng Tsz Yau (Hong Kong) Yuen Sin Ying	21	16	21
(Malaysia) Vivian Hoo (Malaysia) Yap Cheng Wen	18	21	14

=== Top half ===
==== Section 1 ====
First Round
PFQ	(India) R Tulasi (India) P Prabhu Chimulkar	9	15
Q3	(Indonesia) D D Ayustine (Indonesia) R Hartawan	21	21
(India) S Singhi (India) R Thaker	19	17
(Indonesia) T O Kusumah (Indonesia) V A Sukoco	21	21
5	(Hong Kong) Ng T Y (Hong Kong) Yuen S Y	21	21
(India) A K Jamaludeen (India) A Saraboji	5	10
(Indonesia) H Julimarbela (Indonesia) A Wiratama	11	19
(India) R Panda (India) A S Sunil	21	21

Second Round
Q3	(Indonesia) D D Ayustine (Indonesia) R Hartawan	19	21	15
(Indonesia) T O Kusumah (Indonesia) V A Sukoco	21	15	21
5	(Hong Kong) Ng T Y (Hong Kong) Yuen S Y	21	21
(India) R Panda (India) A S Sunil	9	14

Quarter-finals
(Indonesia) T O Kusumah (Indonesia) V A Sukoco	18	21	13
5	(Hong Kong) Ng T Y (Hong Kong) Yuen S Y	21	14	21

==== Section 2 ====
First Round
3	(Indonesia) A Imanuela (Indonesia) S F S Ramadhanti	21	21
(Hong Kong) Fan K Y (Hong Kong) Wong C C	10	8
(Hong Kong) Ng S Y (Hong Kong) Wu Y T	21	21
(India) R Anand (India) R Jaiswal	8	7
7	(India) A Balan (India) Sruthi K. P.	21	18	21
Q1	(India) S Bandi (India) T Ramesh	12	21	9
(India) P Dandu (India) S Santosh	14	21	21
Q4	(Hong Kong) Cheung Y M (Hong Kong) A Tsang	21	7	15

Second Round
3	(Indonesia) A Imanuela (Indonesia) S F S Ramadhanti	21	21
(Hong Kong) Ng S Y (Hong Kong) Wu Y T	12	12
7	(India) A Balan (India) Sruthi K. P.	21	12	19
(India) P Dandu (India) S Santosh	15	21	21

Quarter-finals
3	(Indonesia) A Imanuela (Indonesia) S F S Ramadhanti	14	21	21
(India) P Dandu (India) S Santosh	21	10	13

=== Bottom half ===
==== Section 3 ====
First Round
(India) D Gupta (Indonesia) R A Violeta	21	21
(India) R Arolker (India) A Warang	16	18
(Thailand) B Aimsaard (Thailand) N Aimsaard	21	21
8	(India) H Veludurthi (India) K Wadkar	12	16
(India) S Chowdhary (India) A Goel	7	4
(Malaysia) V Hoo (Malaysia) Yap C W	21	21
(India) S Jupudi (India) P Konadam	17	12
4	(Hong Kong) Ng W Y (Hong Kong) Yeung N T	21	21

Second Round
(India) D Gupta (Indonesia) R A Violeta	16	13
(Thailand) B Aimsaard (Thailand) N Aimsaard	21	21
(Malaysia) V Hoo (Malaysia) Yap C W	21	18	24
4	(Hong Kong) Ng W Y (Hong Kong) Yeung N T	14	21	22

Quarter-finals
(Thailand) B Aimsaard (Thailand) N Aimsaard	12	10
(Malaysia) V Hoo (Malaysia) Yap C W	21	21

==== Section 4 ====
First Round
(Indonesia) F D Kusuma (Indonesia) R Sugiarto	21	21
(India) D Choudhary (India) M Yadav	14	13
(India) S Ghorpade (India) K. Maneesha	14	19
6	(Indonesia) Y Barkah (Indonesia) J F Sugiarto	21	21
(Indonesia) W O Kandow (Indonesia) R E Putri Sari	21	21
(India) K Garg (India) N B Hazarika	10	13
Q2	(India) Ka Gupta (India) Kh Gupta	17	9
2	(India) M Jakkampudi (India) P S. Ram	21	21

Second Round
(Indonesia) F D Kusuma (Indonesia) R Sugiarto	15	18
6	(Indonesia) Y Barkah (Indonesia) J F Sugiarto	21	21
(Indonesia) W O Kandow (Indonesia) R E Putri Sari	21	21
2	(India) M Jakkampudi (India) P S. Ram	13	13

Quarter-finals
6	(Indonesia) Y Barkah (Indonesia) J F Sugiarto	15	21	21
(Indonesia) W O Kandow (Indonesia) R E Putri Sari	21	19	14

== Mixed doubles ==
=== Seeds ===
1. (India) Pranav Chopra / N. Sikki Reddy (final)
2. (India) Satwiksairaj Rankireddy / Ashwini Ponnappa (withdrew)
3. (India) Rohan Kapoor / Kuhoo Garg (first round)
4. (India) Saurabh Sharma / Anoushka Parikh (first round)
5. (Hong Kong) Chang Tak Ching / Ng Wing Yung (semi-finals)
6. (Indonesia) Akbar Bintang Cahyono / Winny Oktavina Kandow (champions)
7. (India) Shivam Sharma / Poorvisha S. Ram (second round)
8. (India) Vinay Kumar Singh / Anamika Kashyap (withdrew)

=== Finals ===
Semi-finals
1	(India) Pranav Chopra (India) N. Sikki Reddy	21	21
5	(Hong Kong) Chang Tak Ching (Hong Kong) Ng Wing Yung	19	15
Q3	(Indonesia) Renaldi Samosir (Indonesia) Hediana Julimarbela	20	13
6	(Indonesia) Akbar Bintang Cahyono (Indonesia) Winny Oktavina Kandow	22	21

Final
1	(India) Pranav Chopra (India) N. Sikki Reddy	21	19	23
6	(Indonesia) Akbar Bintang Cahyono (Indonesia) Winny Oktavina Kandow	15	21	25

=== Top half ===
==== Section 1 ====
First Round
1	(India) P Chopra (India) N. S Reddy	21	21
(India) N Dua (India) M Yadav	7	10
(India) Siddharth. (India) D Choudhary	9	14
(Hong Kong) Yeung S C (Hong Kong) Fan K Y	21	21
7	(India) Si Sharma (India) P S. Ram	21	25
Q4	(India) N Bokka (India) S Bandi	12	23
(Hong Kong) Yeung M N (Hong Kong) Ng T Y	21	21
(India) K P Garaga (India) R Panda	13	11

Second Round
1	(India) P Chopra (India) N. S Reddy	21	22
(Hong Kong) Yeung S C (Hong Kong) Fan K Y	10	20
7	(India) Si Sharma (India) P S. Ram	13	17
(Hong Kong) Yeung M N (Hong Kong) Ng T Y	21	21

Quarter-finals
1	(India) P Chopra (India) N. S Reddy	22	14	21
(Hong Kong) Yeung M N (Hong Kong) Ng T Y	20	21	17

==== Section 2 ====
First Round
4	(India) Sa Sharma (India) A Parikh	21	16	11
Q1	(Hong Kong) Chung Y (Hong Kong) Tsang W C	19	21	21
(Hong Kong) Tam C H (Hong Kong) Ng S Y	13	21	23
(India) S S K Podile (India) S Jupudi	21	19	21
5	(Hong Kong) Chang T C (Hong Kong) Ng W Y	21	21
(India) Raju M R (India) J. A K	9	14
(India) V Devlekar (India) H Veludurthi	13	5
(Indonesia) Z J Sumanti (Indonesia) A Wiratama	21	21

Second Round
Q1	(Hong Kong) Chung Y (Hong Kong) Tsang W C	21	13	16
(Hong Kong) Tam C H (Hong Kong) Ng S Y	15	21	21
5	(Hong Kong) Chang T C (Hong Kong) Ng W Y	18	21	21
(Indonesia) Z J Sumanti (Indonesia) A Wiratama	21	17	17

Quarter-finals
(Hong Kong) Tam C H (Hong Kong) Ng S Y	11	14
5	(Hong Kong) Chang T C (Hong Kong) Ng W Y	21	21

=== Bottom half ===
==== Section 3 ====
First Round
Q2	(India) B Narendran Geetha (India) A Agna	17	14
(India) S. Sunjith Jr (India) Sruthi K.P	21	21
(Hong Kong) Li K H (Hong Kong) Wu Y T	17	16
PFQ	(India) B. S Reddy (India) A S Sunil	21	21
(India) D Kapila (India) M Jakkampudi	13	21
(Hong Kong) Mak H C (Hong Kong) Yeung N T	21	23
Q3	(Indonesia) R Samosir (Indonesia) H Julimarbela	20	21	21
3	(India) R Kapoor (India) K Garg	22	5	13

Second Round
(India) S. Sunjith Jr (India) Sruthi K.P	11	21	21
PFQ	(India) B. S Reddy (India) A S Sunil	21	15	11
(Hong Kong) Mak H C (Hong Kong) Yeung N T	21	15	17
Q3	(Indonesia) R Samosir (Indonesia) H Julimarbela	14	21	21

Quarter-finals
(India) S. Sunjith Jr (India) Sruthi K.P	16	13
Q3	(Indonesia) R Samosir (Indonesia) H Julimarbela	21	21

==== Section 4 ====
First Round
(Hong Kong) Ho W L (Hong Kong) Yuen S Y	21	21
(India) U Arora (India) K Wadkar	19	14
(India) N Kidambi (India) S Santosh	11	10
6	(Indonesia) A B Cahyono (Indonesia) W O Kandow	21	21
(India) V G Prasad (India) J Dewangan	8	16
(Indonesia) R N Kusharjanto (Indonesia) S F S Ramadhanti	21	21
(India) Arjun M.R. (India) K. Maneesha	21	21
PFQ	(India) A Saxena (India) R Anand	8	9

Second Round
(Hong Kong) Ho W L (Hong Kong) Yuen S Y	10	9
6	(Indonesia) A B Cahyono (Indonesia) W O Kandow	21	21
(Indonesia) R N Kusharjanto (Indonesia) S F S Ramadhanti	21	19	15
(India) Arjun M.R. (India) K. Maneesha	8	21	21

Quarter-finals
6	(Indonesia) A B Cahyono (Indonesia) W O Kandow	21	21
(India) Arjun M.R. (India) K. Maneesha	7	12

Preceded by Debut year	Hyderabad Open	Succeeded by 2019 Hyderabad Open
Preceded by 2018 Spain Masters	BWF World Tour; 2018 BWF season	Succeeded by 2018 Japan Open
