= Firman Abdul Kholik =

Indonesian badminton player

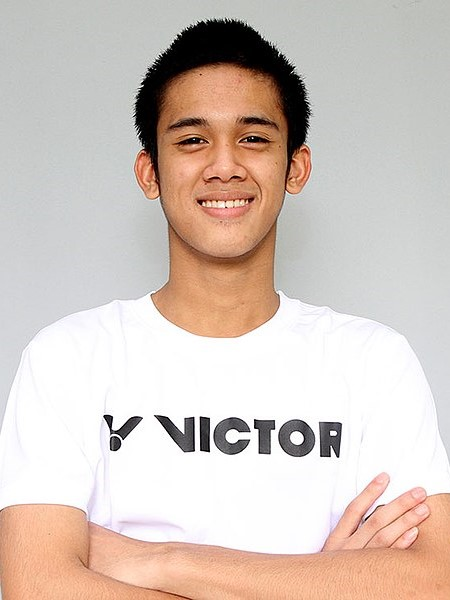

Personal information
- Born: 11 August 1997 (age 29) Banjar, West Java, Indonesia
- Height: 1.73 m (5 ft 8 in)

Sport
- Country: Indonesia
- Sport: Badminton
- Handedness: Left

Men's singles
- Career record: 131 wins, 71 losses
- Highest ranking: 42 (16 April 2019)
- BWF profile
Medal record
Men's badminton
Representing Indonesia
Sudirman Cup
Bronze medal – third place	2015 Dongguan	Mixed team
Thomas Cup
Bronze medal – third place	2018 Bangkok	Men's team
Asia Team Championships
Gold medal – first place	2018 Alor Setar	Men's team
Gold medal – first place	2020 Manila	Men's team
SEA Games
Gold medal – first place	2015 Singapore	Men's team
Gold medal – first place	2017 Kuala Lumpur	Men's team
Gold medal – first place	2019 Philippines	Men's team
World Junior Championships
Silver medal – second place	2014 Alor Setar	Mixed team
Silver medal – second place	2015 Lima	Mixed team
Asian Junior Championships
Bronze medal – third place	2015 Bangkok	Mixed team

Firman Abdul Kholik (born 11 August 1997) is an Indonesian badminton player who is a singles specialist. He is better known when helping Indonesia win the 2018 Asia Team Championships. Kholik also took part as Indonesia winning team in 2015, 2017, and 2019 SEA Games.

== Achievements ==
=== BWF World Tour (1 title) ===
The BWF World Tour, which was announced on 19 March 2017 and implemented in 2018, is a series of elite badminton tournaments sanctioned by the Badminton World Federation (BWF). The BWF World Tour is divided into levels of World Tour Finals, Super 1000, Super 750, Super 500, Super 300, and the BWF Tour Super 100.

Men's singles
Year	Tournament	Level	Opponent	Score	Result	Ref.
2019	Akita Masters	Super 100	(Japan) Yu Igarashi	21–18, 22–20	(gold) Winner	

=== BWF Grand Prix (1 runner-up) ===
The BWF Grand Prix had two levels, the Grand Prix and Grand Prix Gold. It was a series of badminton tournaments sanctioned by the Badminton World Federation (BWF) and played between 2007 and 2017.

Men's singles
Year	Tournament	Opponent	Score	Result	Ref.
2014	Indonesian Masters	(India) H. S. Prannoy	11–21, 20–22	(silver) Runner-up	

BWF Grand Prix Gold tournament
BWF Grand Prix tournament

=== BWF International Challenge/Series (3 titles, 2 runners-up) ===
Men's singles
Year	Tournament	Opponent	Score	Result	Ref.
2014	Bahrain International	(India) Anand Pawar	20–22, 21–13, 21–13	(gold) Winner	
2015	Vietnam International	(Thailand) Khosit Phetpradab	20–22, 21–14, 21–18	(gold) Winner	
2019	Vietnam International	(Indonesia) Chico Aura Dwi Wardoyo	21–16, 21–7	(gold) Winner	
2022	Dutch International	(Denmark) Magnus Johannesen	19–21, 9–21	(silver) Runner-up	
2022	Slovenia Future Series	(Indonesia) Andi Fadel Muhammad	19–21, 27–29	(silver) Runner-up	

BWF International Challenge tournament
BWF International Series tournament
BWF Future Series tournament

=== BWF Junior International (1 title) ===
Boys' singles
Year	Tournament	Opponent	Score	Result	Ref.
2014	Jaya Raya Junior International	(Indonesia) Panji Ahmad Maulana	21–15, 21–13	(gold) Winner	

BWF Junior International Grand Prix tournament
BWF Junior International Challenge tournament
BWF Junior International Series tournament
BWF Junior Future Series tournament

== Performance timeline ==
=== National team ===
- Junior level

Team events	2014	2015
Asian Junior Championships	A	Bronze
World Junior Championships	Silver	Silver

- Senior level

Team events	2015	2016	2017	2018	2019	2020
SEA Games	Gold	—N/a	Gold	—N/a	Gold	—N/a
Asia Team Championships	—N/a	A	—N/a	Gold	—N/a	Gold
Asia Mixed Team Championships	—N/a		QF	—N/a	A	—N/a
Thomas Cup	—N/a	A	—N/a	Bronze	—N/a	
Sudirman Cup	Bronze	—N/a	A	—N/a	A	—N/a

=== Individual competitions ===
- Junior level

Events	2014	2015
Asian Junior Championships	A	QF
World Junior Championships	R1	QF

- Senior level

Events	2015	2016	2017	2018	2019
SEA Games	R16	—N/a	A	—N/a	R16

Tournament	2018	2019	Best	Ref
BWF World Tour
Indonesia Masters	Q1	Q1	F (2014)	
Thailand Masters	R2	QF	QF (2019)	
Lingshui China Masters	R1	R2	R2 (2019)	
New Zealand Open	R1	A	R2 (2017)	
Singapore Open	R1	A	R1 (2018)	
Hyderabad Open	SF	R3	SF (2018)	
Akita Masters	R3	W	W (2019)	
Vietnam Open	R2	R1	SF (2016)	
Thailand Open	Q1	A	R3 (2015)	
Chinese Taipei Open	R2	A	R2 (2018)	
Indonesia Masters Super 100	SF	R2	SF (2018)	
Macau Open	QF	R1	QF (2018)	
Syed Modi International	R2	A	R2 (2018)	
Korea Masters	R1	A	R3 (2017)	
Year-end ranking	61	80	42	
Tournament	2018	2019	Best	

Tournament	2015	2016	2017	Best
BWF Superseries
Malaysia Open	A		Q1	Q1 (2017)
Singapore Open	A		Q1	Q1 (2017)
Indonesia Open	Q1	Q1	A	Q1 (2015, 2016)

Tournament	2014	2015	2016	2017	Best	Ref
BWF Grand Prix and Grand Prix Gold
Malaysia Masters	A			R1	R1 (2017)	
Thailand Masters	—N/a		R3	R3	R3 (2016, 2017)	
Swiss Open	A		R2	A	R2 (2016)	
German Open	A	R3	A		R3 (2015)	
New Zealand Open	A			R2	R2 (2017)	
China Masters	A		R2	R2	R2 (2016, 2017)	
Chinese Taipei Open	A	R1	R1	A	R1 (2015, 2016)	
Vietnam Open	A	R1	SF	R1	SF (2016)	
Thailand Open	—N/a	R3	R2	A	R3 (2015)	
Chinese Taipei Masters	—N/a	R2	R2	—N/a	R2 (2015, 2016)	
Korea Masters	A			R3	R3 (2017)	
Macau Open	R1	R2	R3	R3	R3 (2016, 2017)	
Indonesian Masters	F	R1	R3	—N/a	F (2014)	
Year-end ranking	160	79	81	81		
Tournament	2014	2015	2016	2017	Best	

== Record against selected opponents ==
Record against year-end Finals finalists, World Championships semi finalists, and Olympic quarter finalists. Accurate as of 18 February 2020.

Player	Matches	Win	Lost	Diff.
(Denmark) Jan Ø. Jørgensen	2	0	2	–2
(India) Parupalli Kashyap	1	0	1	–1
(Indonesia) Anthony Sinisuka Ginting	2	1	1	0
(Indonesia) Sony Dwi Kuncoro	1	1	0	+1
(Malaysia) Liew Daren	1	0	1	–1
(South Korea) Lee Hyun-il	2	0	2	–2
(South Korea) Son Wan-ho	2	0	2	–2
(Thailand) Kantaphon Wangcharoen	3	0	3	–3
