= Winny Oktavina Kandow =

Indonesian badminton player (born 1998)

Personal information
- Born: 14 October 1998 (age 28) Minahasa, North Sulawesi, Indonesia

Sport
- Country: Indonesia
- Sport: Badminton
- Handedness: Right

Women's & mixed doubles
- Highest ranking: 140 (WD with Mychelle Crhystine Bandaso, 23 August 2018); 15 (XD with Tontowi Ahmad, 24 September 2019)
- BWF profile
Medal record
Women's badminton
Representing Indonesia
Asia Mixed Team Championships
Bronze medal – third place	2019 Hong Kong	Mixed team

Winny Oktavina Kandow (born 14 October 1998) is an Indonesian badminton player specializes in doubles from Tewasen village in South Minahasa (then of Minahasa), North Sulawesi.

== Career ==
Trained at the Tangkas Intiland Jakarta, she managed to claim the 2016 junior national mixed doubles title partnered with Yeremia Rambitan, and led her to join national team in 2017. Kandow entered the 2017 National Championships held in Pangkal Pinang with Akbar Bintang Cahyono, and the duo seized the national mixed doubles title after competing as an unseeded player. She is increasingly known after reaching the 2018 Singapore Open semifinal stage with Cahyono, but was defeated by their senior teammates Tontowi Ahmad and Liliyana Natsir in a tight straight games. She succeed in clinching her first international title by winning the 2018 Hyderabad Open.

=== 2023 ===
In January, Kandow and her partner Amri Syahnawi competed at the Thailand Masters, but had to lose in the quarter-finals from 5th seed Korean pair Seo Seung-jae and Chae Yoo-jung.

In March, Kandow and Syahnawi competed in the European tour at the Spain Masters, but had to lose in the quarter-finals from Danish pair Mathias Thyrri and Amalie Magelund. In the next tour, Syahnawi and Kandow lost again in the quarter-finals at the Orléans Masters in France, this time from Chinese Taipei pair Ye Hong-wei and Lee Chia-hsin.

In May, Kandow and Syahnawi competed in the second Asian tour at the Malaysia Masters, but had to lose in qualifying rounds from Chinese Taipei pair Lee Jhe-huei and Hsu Ya-ching.

In September, Kandow and Syahnawi as the 4th seed lost at the first round of Indonesia Masters Super 100 I from Thai pair Tanupat Viriyangkura and Alisa Sapniti in rubber games.

== Achievements ==
=== BWF World Tour (1 title) ===
The BWF World Tour, which was announced on 19 March 2017 and implemented in 2018, is a series of elite badminton tournaments sanctioned by the Badminton World Federation (BWF). The BWF World Tours are divided into levels of World Tour Finals, Super 1000, Super 750, Super 500, Super 300 (part of the HSBC World Tour), and the BWF Tour Super 100.

Mixed doubles
Year	Tournament	Level	Partner	Opponent	Score	Result
2018	Hyderabad Open	Super 100	(Indonesia) Akbar Bintang Cahyono	(India) Pranav Chopra (India) N. Sikki Reddy	15–21, 21–19, 25–23	(gold) Winner

=== BWF International Challenge/Series (3 titles, 2 runners-up) ===
Mixed doubles
Year	Tournament	Partner	Opponent	Score	Result
2018	Finnish Open	(Indonesia) Akbar Bintang Cahyono	(Indonesia) Alfian Eko Prasetya (Indonesia) Marsheilla Gischa Islami	18–21, 16–21	(silver) Runner-up
2021	Bahrain International Challenge	(Indonesia) Akbar Bintang Cahyono	(Hong Kong) Law Cheuk Him (Hong Kong) Yeung Nga Ting	21–11, 13–21, 11–21	(silver) Runner-up
2022	Lithuanian International	(Indonesia) Amri Syahnawi	(Hong Kong) Lui Chun Wai (Hong Kong) Fu Chi Yan	21–6, 21–11	(gold) Winner
2022	Bonn International	(Indonesia) Amri Syahnawi	(France) Samy Corvée (France) Flavie Vallet	21–7, 21–7	(gold) Winner
2022	Nantes International	(Indonesia) Amri Syahnawi	(Thailand) Ratchapol Makkasasithorn (Thailand) Jhenicha Sudjaipraparat	21–15, 21–18	(gold) Winner

BWF International Challenge tournament
BWF International Series tournament
BWF Future Series tournament

== Performance timeline ==
Key

W	Won	F	Finalist	SF	Semi-finalist
QF	Quarter-finalist	#R	Rounds 4, 3, 2, 1	RR	Round-robin stage
Q#	Qualification round	A	Absent	w/d	Withdrew
G	Gold	S	Silver	B	Bronze
NH	Not held	N/A	Not applicable	DNQ	Did not qualify

=== Indonesian team ===
- Senior level

Team events	2019
Asia Mixed Team Championships	B
Sudirman Cup	DNP

=== Individual competitions ===
==== Senior level ====
===== Women's doubles =====
Tournament	BWF World Tour	Best
Tournament	2018	Best
Orléans Masters	2R	2R ('18)
Singapore Open	1R	1R ('18)
Thailand Open	1R	1R ('18)
Akita Masters	1R	1R ('18)
Hyderabad Open	QF	QF ('18)
Macau Open	QF	QF ('18)
Year-end ranking	164	140
Tournament	2018	Best

===== Mixed doubles =====
Tournament	BWF World Tour						Best	Ref
Tournament	2018	2019	2020	2021	2022	2023	Best	Ref
Malaysia Open	A	QF	NH		A		QF ('19)	
India Open	A	QF	NH		A		QF ('19)	
Indonesia Masters	1R	1R	A				1R ('18, '19)	
Thailand Masters	QF	QF	A	NH		QF	QF ('18, '19, '23)	
German Open	A	2R	NH		A		2R ('19)	
All England Open	A	QF	A				QF ('19)	
Spain Masters	A	QF	A	1R	NH	QF	QF ('19, '23)	
Orléans Masters	2R	A	NH	2R	2R	QF	QF ('23)	
Malaysia Masters	A			NH	A	Q1	Q1 ('23)	
Thailand Open	1R	1R	A	NH	A	Q1	1R ('18, '19)	
Singapore Open	SF	A	NH		A		SF ('18)	
Indonesia Open	A	QF	NH	A			QF (19)	
Chinese Taipei Open	w/d	QF	NH		A		QF ('19)	
Korea Open	A	1R	NH		A		1R ('19)	
Japan Open	A	1R	NH		A		1R ('19)	
Australian Open	A	1R	NH		1R	A	1R ('19, '22)	
Indonesia Masters Super 100	1R	A	NH		QF	1R	SF ('23)	
Indonesia Masters Super 100	1R	A	NH		QF	SF	SF ('23)	
China Open	A	QF	NH			A	QF ('19)	
Hong Kong Open	A	1R	NH			A	1R ('19)	
Denmark Open	A	1R	A				1R ('19)	
French Open	A	1R	NH	A			1R ('19)	
Korea Masters	QF	A	NH		A		QF ('18)	
Fuzhou China Open	1R	A	NH			A	1R ('18)	
Guwahati Masters	NH					QF	QF ('23)	
Odisha Masters	NH				A	2R	2R ('23)	
Akita Masters	QF	A	NH				QF ('18)	
Hyderabad Open	W	A	NH				W ('18)	
Macau Open	SF	A	NH				SF ('18)	
Year-end ranking	30	16	20	171	60	56	15	
Tournament	2018	2019	2020	2021	2022	2023	Best	Ref
