= Yuen Sin Ying =

Hong Kong badminton player

Yuen Sin Ying 袁倩瀅
Personal information
- Born: 13 January 1994 (age 32) Hong Kong
- Height: 1.63 m (5 ft 4 in)
- Weight: 59 kg (130 lb)

Sport
- Country: Hong Kong
- Sport: Badminton
- Handedness: Right
- Coached by: Tim He Yiming

Women's & mixed doubles
- Highest ranking: 28 (WD 6 December 2018); 79 (XD 8 November 2018)
- Current ranking: 141 (WD) (27 September 2022)
- BWF profile
Medal record
Women's badminton
Representing Hong Kong
Asia Mixed Team Championships
Bronze medal – third place	2019 Hong Kong	Mixed team

Yuen Sin Ying (Chinese: 袁倩瀅, born 13 January 1994) is a Hong Kong badminton player. She competed at the 2018 Asian Games in Jakarta, Indonesia. She won her first international title at the 2018 Hyderabad Open, a World Super 100 tournament, in the women's doubles event partnered with Ng Tsz Yau.

== Achievements ==
=== BWF World Tour (1 title) ===
The BWF World Tour, which was announced on 19 March 2017 and implemented in 2018, is a series of elite badminton tournaments sanctioned by the Badminton World Federation (BWF). The BWF World Tour is divided into levels of World Tour Finals, Super 1000, Super 750, Super 500, Super 300 (part of the HSBC World Tour), and the BWF Tour Super 100.

Women's doubles
Year	Tournament	Level	Partner	Opponent	Score	Result
2018	Hyderabad Open	Super 100	(Hong Kong) Ng Tsz Yau	(Malaysia) Vivian Hoo (Malaysia) Yap Cheng Wen	21–18, 16–21, 21–14	(gold) Winner

=== BWF International Challenge/Series ===
Women's doubles
Year	Tournament	Partner	Opponent	Score	Result
2017	Tata Open India International	(Hong Kong) Ng Wing Yung	(Hong Kong) Ng Tsz Yau (Hong Kong) Yeung Nga Ting	25–23, 14–21, 19–21	(silver) Runner-up
2018	Singapore International	(Hong Kong) Ng Tsz Yau	(Hong Kong) Ng Wing Yung (Hong Kong) Yeung Nga Ting	21–17, 21–17	(gold) Winner

BWF International Challenge tournament
BWF International Series tournament
