= Kohei Gondo =

Japanese badminton player (born 1991)

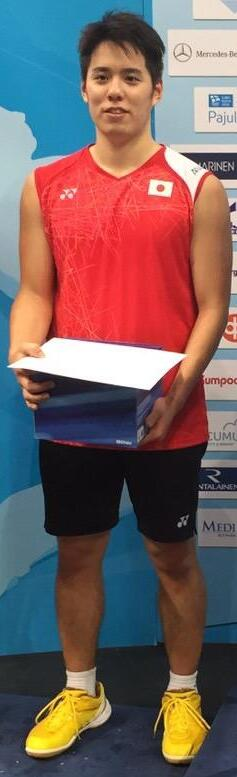

Personal information
- Born: 27 December 1991 (age 34) Kumamoto Prefecture, Japan
- Height: 1.75 m (5 ft 9 in)
- Weight: 80 kg (176 lb)

Sport
- Country: Japan
- Sport: Badminton

Men's & mixed doubles
- Highest ranking: 59 (MD 22 February 2018); 28 (XD 19 March 2019)
- BWF profile
Medal record
Men's badminton
Representing Japan
Asia Mixed Team Championships
Silver medal – second place	2019 Hong Kong	Mixed team

Kohei Gondo (権藤 公平, Gondō Kōhei; born 27 December 1991) is a Japanese badminton player and also plays for the Tonami badminton club. He was the 2013 men's doubles and 2014 mixed doubles semi-finalist at the USA International Challenge tournament.

== Achievements ==
=== BWF World Tour (1 title) ===
The BWF World Tour, which was announced on 19 March 2017 and implemented in 2018, is a series of elite badminton tournaments sanctioned by the Badminton World Federation (BWF). The BWF World Tour is divided into levels of World Tour Finals, Super 1000, Super 750, Super 500, Super 300 (part of the HSBC World Tour), and the BWF Tour Super 100.

Mixed doubles
Year	Tournament	Level	Partner	Opponent	Score	Result	Ref.
2018	Akita Masters	Super 100	(Japan) Ayane Kurihara	(Indonesia) Alfian Eko Prasetya (Indonesia) Angelica Wiratama	21–9, 21–23, 21–17	(gold) Winner	

=== BWF International Challenge/Series (2 titles, 2 runners-up) ===
Men's doubles
Year	Tournament	Partner	Opponent	Score	Result	Ref.
2017	Finnish Open	(Japan) Tatsuya Watanabe	(Chinese Taipei) Liao Min-chun (Chinese Taipei) Su Cheng-heng	16–21, 16–21	(silver) Runner-up	

Mixed doubles
Year	Tournament	Partner	Opponent	Score	Result
2018	South Australia International	(Japan) Ayane Kurihara	(Singapore) Terry Hee (Singapore) Citra Putri Sari Dewi	20–22, 18–21	(silver) Runner-up
2018	Indonesia International	(Japan) Ayane Kurihara	(Indonesia) Adnan Maulana (Indonesia) Shela Devi Aulia	21–17, 23–21	(gold) Winner
2018	Yonex / K&D Graphics International	(Japan) Ayane Kurihara	(Thailand) Natchanon Tulamok (Thailand) Natcha Saenghote	21–7, 21–16	(gold) Winner

BWF International Challenge tournament
