= Yukiko Takahata =

Japanese badminton player

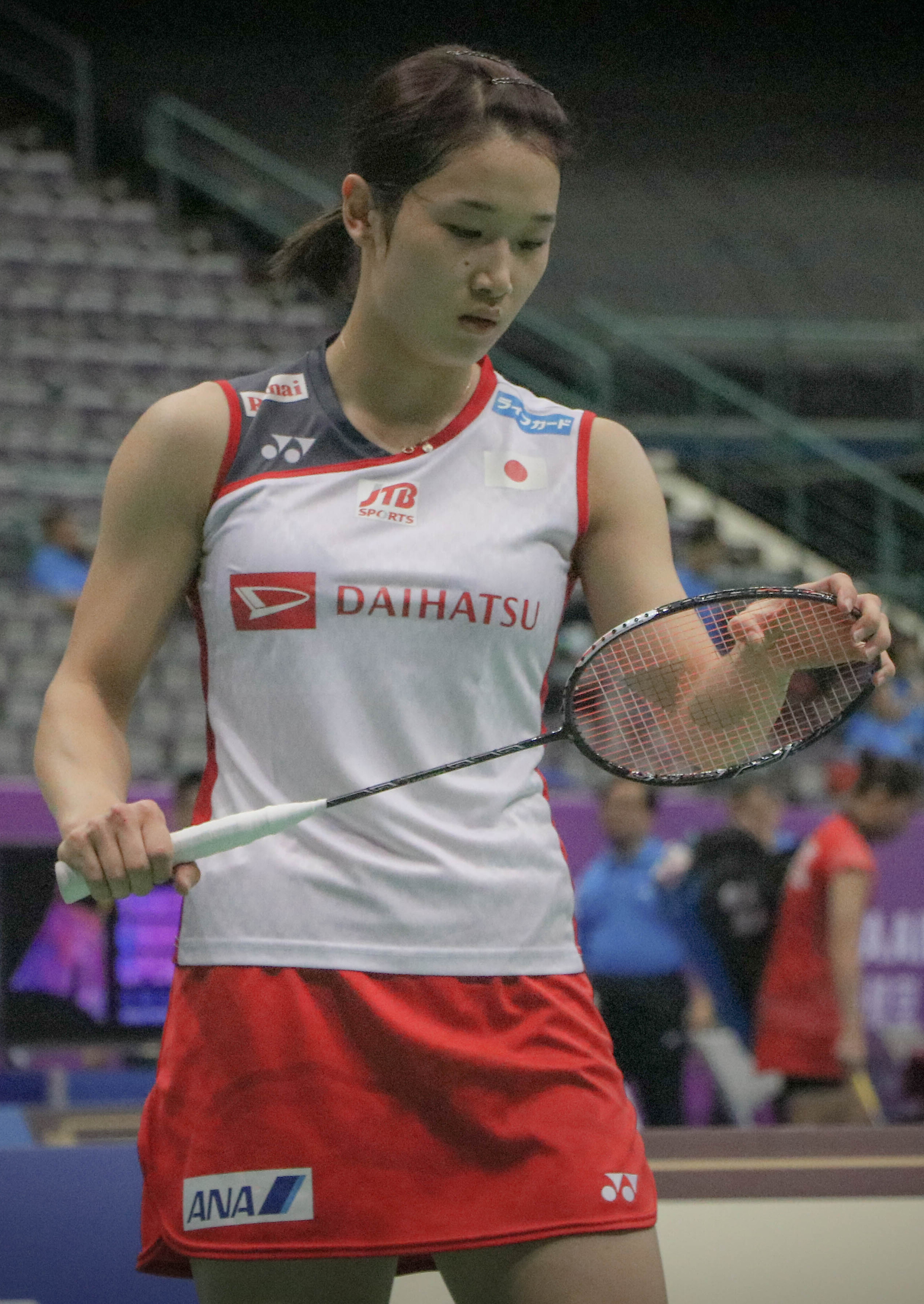
- Takahata in Taipei, Taiwan in October 2018

Personal information
- Born: 18 March 1998 (age 28) Hokkaido, Japan
- Height: 1.59 m (5 ft 3 in)

Sport
- Country: Japan
- Sport: Badminton
- Handedness: Right
- Retired: 30 November 2021

Women's doubles
- Highest ranking: 9 (with Ayako Sakuramoto 5 February 2019)
- BWF profile
Medal record
Women's badminton
Representing Japan
Asia Mixed Team Championships
Silver medal – second place	2019 Hong Kong	Mixed team

Yukiko Takahata (高畑 祐紀子, Takahata Yukiko; born 18 March 1998) is a former Japanese badminton player from the Yonex team. In 2017, she became the women's doubles runner-up at the Osaka International tournament partnered with Ayako Sakuramoto. She won her first senior international title at the Spanish International tournament with Sakuramoto.

Takahata started to represent the national team in the 2015 World Junior Championships held in Lima, Peru, and helped the team reach the semifinals. At the BWF Grand Prix events, her best result was a runner-up at the 2017 New Zealand Open.

Teamed-up with Sakuramoto, Takahata won seven of eight finals of the 2018 BWF World Tour, with a title of Super 500 tournament from Singapore Open, three titles of Super 300 tournament from Swiss, New Zealand, and Australia Open; and three titles of Super 100 tournament. She participated at the 2019 Asia Mixed Team Championships, and won the silver medal after the team lost to the Chinese in the final.

== Achievements ==
=== BWF World Tour (8 titles, 1 runners-up) ===
The BWF World Tour, which was announced on 19 March 2017 and implemented in 2018, is a series of elite badminton tournaments sanctioned by the Badminton World Federation (BWF). The BWF World Tours are divided into levels of World Tour Finals, Super 1000, Super 750, Super 500, Super 300, and the BWF Tour Super 100.

Women's doubles
Year	Tournament	Level	Partner	Opponent	Score	Result	Ref.
2018	Swiss Open	Super 300	(Japan) Ayako Sakuramoto	(Bulgaria) Gabriela Stoeva (Bulgaria) Stefani Stoeva	19–21, 21–15, 21–18	(gold) Winner	
2018	New Zealand Open	Super 300	(Japan) Ayako Sakuramoto	(China) Cao Tongwei (China) Zheng Yu	21–9, 21–19	(gold) Winner	
2018	Australian Open	Super 300	(Japan) Ayako Sakuramoto	(South Korea) Baek Ha-na (South Korea) Lee Yu-rim	23–21, 21–18	(gold) Winner	
2018	Canada Open	Super 100	(Japan) Ayako Sakuramoto	(Germany) Isabel Herttrich (Germany) Carla Nelte	21–13, 21–15	(gold) Winner	
2018	Singapore Open	Super 500	(Japan) Ayako Sakuramoto	(Japan) Nami Matsuyama (Japan) Chiharu Shida	16–21, 24–22, 21–13	(gold) Winner	
2018	Akita Masters	Super 100	(Japan) Ayako Sakuramoto	(Japan) Nami Matsuyama (Japan) Chiharu Shida	23–21, 21–11	(gold) Winner	
2018	Spain Masters	Super 300	(Japan) Ayako Sakuramoto	(Japan) Mayu Matsumoto (Japan) Wakana Nagahara	17–21, 13–21	(silver) Runner-up	
2018	Indonesia Masters	Super 100	(Japan) Ayako Sakuramoto	(Japan) Nami Matsuyama (Japan) Chiharu Shida	11–21, 21–19, 22–20	(gold) Winner	
2019	Akita Masters	Super 100	(Japan) Ayako Sakuramoto	(Indonesia) Nita Violina Marwah (Indonesia) Putri Syaikah	21–17, 14–21, 21–15	(gold) Winner	

=== BWF Grand Prix ===
The BWF Grand Prix had two levels, the Grand Prix and Grand Prix Gold. It was a series of badminton tournaments sanctioned by the Badminton World Federation (BWF) and played between 2007 and 2017.

Women's doubles
Year	Tournament	Partner	Opponent	Score	Result	Ref.
2017	New Zealand Open	(Japan) Ayako Sakuramoto	(Malaysia) Vivian Hoo (Malaysia) Woon Khe Wei	21–18, 16–21, 19–21	(silver) Runner-up	

BWF Grand Prix Gold tournament

=== BWF International Challenge/Series ===
Women's doubles
Year	Tournament	Partner	Opponent	Score	Result	Ref.
2017	Osaka International	(Japan) Ayako Sakuramoto	(South Korea) Kim So-yeong (South Korea) Yoo Hae-won	21–16, 17–21, 19–21	(silver) Runner-up	
2017	Spanish International	(Japan) Ayako Sakuramoto	(Japan) Misato Aratama (Japan) Akane Watanabe	21–10, 21–15	(gold) Winner	
2018	Osaka International	(Japan) Ayako Sakuramoto	(Japan) Naoko Fukuman (Japan) Kurumi Yonao	21–17, 19–21, 16–21	(silver) Runner-up	

BWF International Challenge tournament
