= Soong Joo Ven =

Malaysian badminton player (born 1995)

Soong Joo Ven 宋侞纹
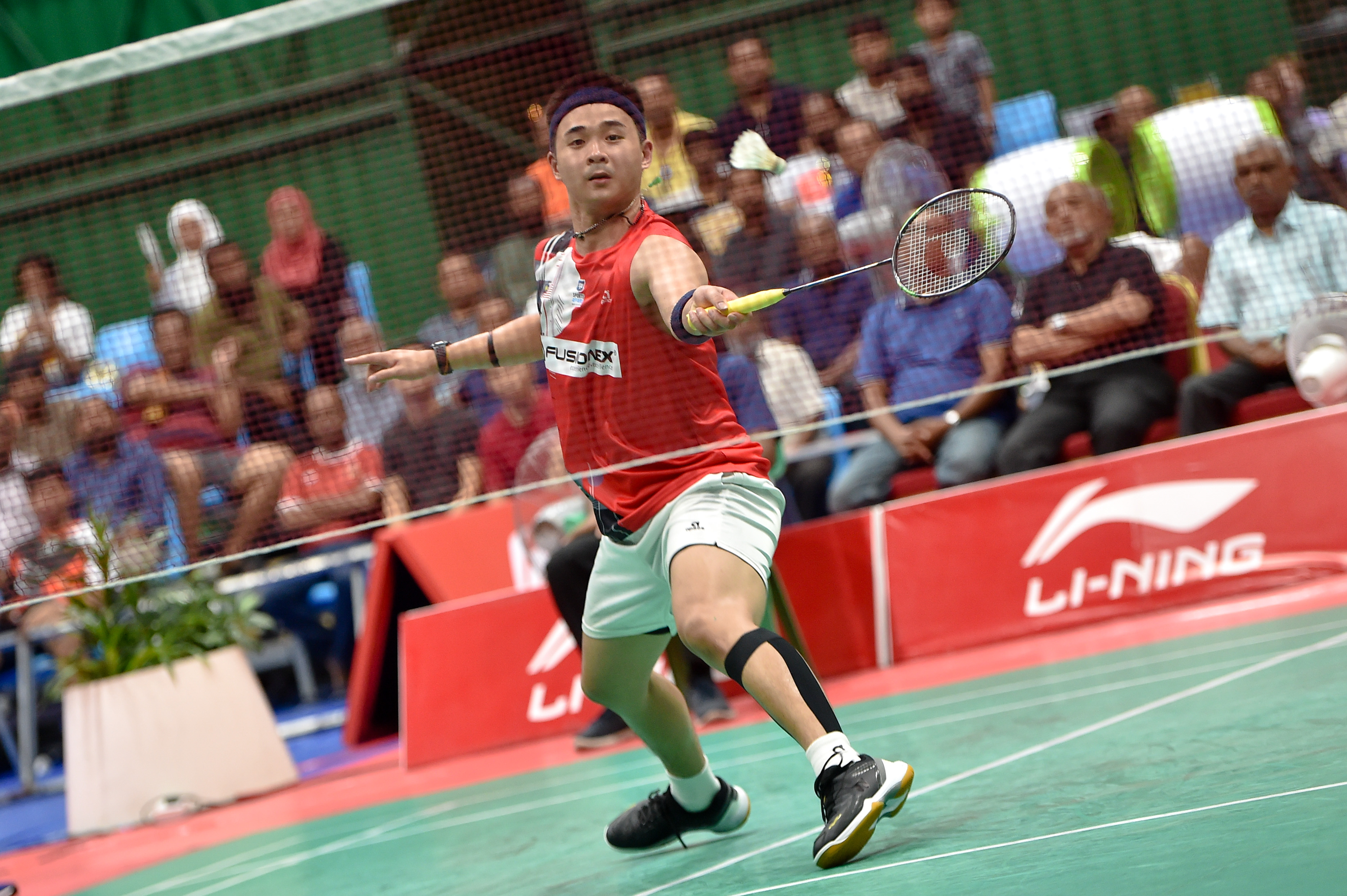
- Soong at the 2023 Maldives International Challenge

Personal information
- Born: 宋浚洋; 19 May 1995 (age 31) Ampang, Selangor, Malaysia
- Years active: 2010–present
- Height: 1.77 m (5 ft 10 in)
- Weight: 65 kg (143 lb)

Sport
- Country: Malaysia
- Sport: Badminton
- Handedness: Left

Men's singles
- Highest ranking: 44 (20 December 2022)
- Current ranking: 72 (30 July 2024)
- BWF profile
Medal record
Men's badminton
Representing Malaysia
Asia Team Championships
| Bronze medal – third place | 2018 Alor Setar | Men's team |
SEA Games
| Silver medal – second place | 2017 Kuala Lumpur | Men's team |
| Silver medal – second place | 2019 Philippines | Men's team |
World Junior Championships
| Gold medal – first place | 2011 Taipei | Mixed team |
Asian Junior Championships
| Silver medal – second place | 2011 Lucknow | Mixed team |
| Silver medal – second place | 2012 Gimcheon | Boys' singles |
| Bronze medal – third place | 2012 Gimcheon | Mixed team |

Soong Joo Ven (Chinese: 宋侞紋; pinyin: Sòng Rúwén; formerly known as Chinese: 宋俊偉; pinyin: Sòng Jùnwěi; born 19 May 1995) is a Malaysian badminton player. He was part of the Malaysian team that won gold in the 2011 BWF World Junior Championships mixed team event.

== Career ==
=== 2011–2017 ===
He won silver medal at the 2012 Asia Junior Championships in the boys' singles event after losing to Kento Momota of Japan. He was the runner-up of the 2015 Malaysia International Challenge tournament in the men's singles event, and in 2016, he also became the runner-up of the Scottish Open Grand Prix tournament. In 2017, he reached the Thailand Open Grand Prix Gold semifinals.

=== 2018 ===
He was a runner-up at the Hyderabad Open, where he lost to Sameer Verma in two games. He also had a few quarterfinal finishes at the German Open and the Korea Masters.

=== 2019 ===
He won the Malaysia International by beating compatriot Cheam June Wei. He was also a semifinalist at the Indonesia Masters Super 100 event in Bangka Belitung.

=== 2022 ===
Alongside Goh Jin Wei, he joined the Kuala Lumpur Badminton Club (KLRC) and is currently being coached by Nova Armada and former national player Sairul Amar Ayob. Shortly after, he lost in the second round of the India Open to Mithun Manjunath.

He then reached the semifinals of the Korea Masters and the Taipei Open.

== Achievements ==
=== Asian Junior Championships ===
Boys' singles
| Year | Venue | Opponent | Score | Result |
|---|---|---|---|---|
| 2012 | Gimcheon Indoor Stadium; Gimcheon, South Korea | (Japan) Kento Momota | 13–21, 20–22 | Silver |

=== BWF World Tour (1 runner-up) ===
The BWF World Tour, which was announced on 19 March 2017 and implemented in 2018, is a series of elite badminton tournaments sanctioned by the Badminton World Federation (BWF). The BWF World Tours are divided into levels of World Tour Finals, Super 1000, Super 750, Super 500, Super 300 (part of the HSBC World Tour), and the BWF Tour Super 100.

Men's singles
| Year | Tournament | Level | Opponent | Score | Result |
|---|---|---|---|---|---|
| 2018 | Hyderabad Open | Super 100 | (India) Sameer Verma | 15–21, 18–21 | (silver) Runner-up |

=== BWF Grand Prix (1 runner-up) ===
The BWF Grand Prix had two levels, the Grand Prix and Grand Prix Gold. It was a series of badminton tournaments sanctioned by the Badminton World Federation (BWF) and played between 2007 and 2017.

Men's singles
| Year | Tournament | Opponent | Score | Result |
|---|---|---|---|---|
| 2016 | Scottish Open | (Denmark) Anders Antonsen | 20–22, 15–21 | (silver) Runner-up |

=== BWF International Challenge/Series (1 title, 5 runners-up) ===
Men's singles
| Year | Tournament | Opponent | Score | Result |
|---|---|---|---|---|
| 2015 | Malaysia International | (Thailand) Khosit Phetpradab | 14–21, 10–21 | (silver) Runner-up |
| 2017 | Polish International | (Malaysia) Lee Zii Jia | 17–21, 16–21 | (silver) Runner-up |
| 2019 | Malaysia International | (Malaysia) Cheam June Wei | 21–13, 22–20 | (gold) Winner |
| 2021 | Scottish Open | (Malaysia) Ng Tze Yong | 18–21, 14–21 | (silver) Runner-up |
| 2023 | Maldives International | (India) Ravi | 19–21, 18–21 | (silver) Runner-up |
| 2024 | Kazakhstan International | (India) Tharun Mannepalli | 10–21, 19–21 | (silver) Runner-up |

BWF International Challenge tournament
BWF International Series tournament
BWF Future Series tournament

== Record against selected opponents ==
Record against year-end Finals finalists, World Championships semi finalists, and Olympic quarter finalists. Accurate as of 7 September 2024.

| Player | Matches | Win | Lost | Diff. |
|---|---|---|---|---|
| (Chinese Taipei) Chou Tien-chen | 3 | 0 | 3 | –3 |
| (Chinese Taipei) Wang Tzu-wei | 4 | 2 | 2 | 0 |
| (Denmark) Anders Antonsen | 2 | 0 | 2 | –2 |
| (Denmark) Hans-Kristian Vittinghus | 2 | 0 | 2 | –2 |
| (India) Srikanth Kidambi | 2 | 0 | 2 | –2 |
| (Indonesia) Anthony Sinisuka Ginting | 1 | 0 | 1 | –1 |
| (Indonesia) Sony Dwi Kuncoro | 1 | 1 | 0 | +1 |
| (Japan) Kento Momota | 1 | 0 | 1 | –1 |
| (South Korea) Lee Hyun-il | 2 | 0 | 2 | –2 |
| (Thailand) Kantaphon Wangcharoen | 1 | 0 | 1 | –1 |
| (Singapore) Loh Kean Yew | 1 | 0 | 1 | –1 |
| (Germany) Marc Zwiebler | 1 | 1 | 0 | +1 |
