= Dubai International (badminton) =

The Dubai International is an open international badminton open tournament held in Dubai, United Arab Emirates. The event is part of the Badminton World Federation's International Challenge and part of the Badminton Asia Circuit.

== Previous winners ==
Year	Men's singles	Women's singles	Men's doubles	Women's doubles	Mixed doubles
2018	(Russia) Vladimir Malkov	(India) Ashmita Chaliha	(South Korea) Kim Sang-soo (South Korea) Yoo Yeon-seong	(South Korea) Go Ah-ra (South Korea) Yoo Chae-ran	(South Korea) Yoo Yeon-seong (South Korea) Park So-young
2019	(Japan) Kodai Naraoka	(Japan) Mako Urushizaki	(Japan) Keiichiro Matsui (Japan) Yoshinori Takeuchi	(Japan) Rin Iwanaga (Japan) Kie Nakanishi	(Russia) Rodion Alimov (Russia) Alina Davletova

== Performances by nation ==
Top Nations
Pos	Nation	MS	WS	MD	WD	XD	Total
1	Japan	1	1	1	1	0	4
2	South Korea	0	0	1	1	1	3
3	Russia	1	0	0	0	1	2
4	India	0	1	0	0	0	1
Total		2	2	2	2	2	10
