= Akbar Bintang Cahyono =

Indonesian badminton player (born 1996)

Personal information
- Born: 12 April 1996 (age 30) Sukoharjo, Central Java, Indonesia
- Height: 1.70 m (5 ft 7 in)

Sport
- Country: Indonesia
- Sport: Badminton
- Handedness: Right

Men's & mixed doubles
- Highest ranking: 34 (MD with Muhammad Reza Pahlevi Isfahani 27 September 2018); 25 (XD with Winny Oktavina Kandow 19 March 2019); 201 (XD with Annisa Saufika 25 June 2019)
- Current ranking: 210 (MD with Ryan Adi Wicaksono), 39 (XD with Marsheilla Gischa Islami) (7 February 2023)
- BWF profile

Akbar Bintang Cahyono (born 12 April 1996) is an Indonesian badminton player affiliated with Djarum badminton club. He started his career in badminton when he was in the elementary school in 2005, and later joined the Ganesha badminton club in Serang. He entered Djarum club after success to compete in scholarship audition in 2015, and was selected to join the national team in January 2017. Cahyono competed the 2017 National Championships held in Pangkal Pinang as an unseeded player in the mixed doubles senior event with Winny Oktavina Kandow, and the duo seize the national mixed doubles title.

Cahyono won his first international title at the 2018 Finnish Open in the men's doubles event partnered with Muhammad Reza Pahlevi Isfahani. In the mixed doubles event he clinched his first title with Winny Oktavina Kandow after won the Super 100 event 2018 Hyderabad Open.

== Career ==
=== 2023 ===
In January, Cahyono and his partner Marsheilla Gischa Islami competed at the home tournament, Indonesia Masters, but had to lose in the qualifying round from junior Chinese pair Jiang Zhenbang and Wei Yaxin. In the next tournament, they lost in the quarter-finals of the Thailand Masters from Japanese pair Hiroki Midorikawa and Natsu Saito.

In March, Cahyono and Islami competed in the Swiss Open, but had to lose in the first round again from junior Chinese pair Jiang Zhenbang and Wei Yaxin. In the next tour, they competed in the Spain Masters, but had to lose in the first round from junior Danish pair Jesper Toft and Clara Graversen.

In April, Cahyono and Islami competed for Orléans Masters in France, but had to lose 1–2 in the first round after secured the first game 21–10 from Taiwanese pair Lee Jhe-huei and Hsu Ya-ching with 18–21, 14–21, in second and third game respectively.

== Achievements ==
=== BWF World Tour (2 titles, 1 runner-up) ===
The BWF World Tour, which was announced on 19 March 2017 and implemented in 2018, is a series of elite badminton tournaments sanctioned by the Badminton World Federation (BWF). The BWF World Tours are divided into levels of World Tour Finals, Super 1000, Super 750, Super 500, Super 300 (part of the HSBC World Tour), and the BWF Tour Super 100.

Men's doubles
Year	Tournament	Level	Partner	Opponent	Score	Result	Ref.
2018	Akita Masters	Super 100	(Indonesia) Muhammad Reza Pahlevi Isfahani	(Japan) Hirokatsu Hashimoto (Japan) Hiroyuki Saeki	21–16, 21–6	(gold) Winner	
2018	Hyderabad Open	Super 100	(Indonesia) Muhammad Reza Pahlevi Isfahani	(India) Satwiksairaj Rankireddy (India) Chirag Shetty	16–21, 14–21	(silver) Runner-up	

Mixed doubles
Year	Tournament	Level	Partner	Opponent	Score	Result
2018	Hyderabad Open	Super 100	(Indonesia) Winny Oktavina Kandow	(India) Pranav Chopra (India) N. Sikki Reddy	15–21, 21–19, 25–23	(gold) Winner

=== BWF International Challenge/Series (2 titles, 3 runners-up) ===
Men's doubles
Year	Tournament	Partner	Opponent	Score	Result
2017	Singapore International	(Indonesia) Giovani Dicky Oktavan	(Indonesia) Kenas Adi Haryanto (Indonesia) Muhammad Reza Pahlevi Isfahani	18–21, 18–21	(silver) Runner-up
2018	Finnish Open	(Indonesia) Muhammad Reza Pahlevi Isfahani	(Indonesia) Rehan Naufal Kusharjanto (Indonesia) Pramudya Kusumawardana	21–14, 21–17	(gold) Winner

Mixed doubles
Year	Tournament	Partner	Opponent	Score	Result
2018	Finnish Open	(Indonesia) Winny Oktavina Kandow	(Indonesia) Alfian Eko Prasetya (Indonesia) Marsheilla Gischa Islami	18–21, 16–21	(silver) Runner-up
2021	Bahrain International	(Indonesia) Winny Oktavina Kandow	(Hong Kong) Law Cheuk Him (Hong Kong) Yeung Nga Ting	21–11, 13–21, 11–21	(silver) Runner-up
2022 (I)	Indonesia International	(Indonesia) Marsheilla Gischa Islami	(Indonesia) Adnan Maulana (Indonesia) Indah Cahya Sari Jamil	21–17, 14–21, 21–16	(gold) Winner

BWF International Challenge tournament
BWF International Series tournament

== Performance timeline ==
Key

W	Won	F	Finalist	SF	Semi-finalist
QF	Quarter-finalist	#R	Rounds 4, 3, 2, 1	RR	Round-robin stage
Q#	Qualification round	A	Absent	w/d	Withdrew
G	Gold	S	Silver	B	Bronze
NH	Not held	N/A	Not applicable	DNQ	Did not qualify

=== Individual competitions ===
==== Senior level ====
===== Men's doubles =====
Tournament	BWF Superseries / Grand Prix					BWF World Tour					Best	Ref
Tournament	2013	2014	2015	2016	2017	2018	2019	2020	2021	2022	Best	Ref
Orléans Masters	N/A					SF	A	NH	A		SF ('18)	
Korea Open	A					1R	A	NH		A	1R ('18)	
Korea Masters	A					1R	A	NH		A	1R ('18)	
Thailand Open	A	NH	A			2R	A		NH	A	2R ('18)	
Indonesia Masters	1R	2R	A	1R	NH	1R	A				2R ('14)	
Indonesia Open	A			2R	1R	A		NH	A		2R ('16)	
Singapore Open	A					1R	A	NH		A	1R ('18)	
Chinese Taipei Open	A					1R	1R	NH		A	1R ('18, '19)	
Akita Masters	N/A					W	A	NH			W ('18)	
Vietnam Open	A						2R	NH		A	2R ('19)	
Indonesia Masters Super 100	N/A					SF	2R	NH		1R	SF ('18)	
Macau Open	A					1R	A	NH			1R ('18)	
Australian Open	A					1R	1R	NH		A	1R ('18, '19)	
New Zealand Open	A					2R	2R	NH			2R ('18, '19)	
Hyderabad Open	N/A					F	A	NH			F ('18)	
Thailand Masters	NH			A			1R	A	NH		1R ('19)	
Year-end ranking	522	239	441	125	86	35	98	108	141	228	34	
Tournament	2013	2014	2015	2016	2017	2018	2019	2020	2021	2022	Best	Ref

===== Mixed doubles =====
Tournament	BWF Superseries / Grand Prix				BWF World Tour						Best	Ref
Tournament	2014	2015	2016	2017	2018	2019	2020	2021	2022	2023	Best	Ref
Indonesia Masters	1R	1R	1R	NH	1R	1R	A			Q2	1R ('14, '15, '16, 18, 19)	
Thailand Masters	NH		A		QF	QF	A	NH		QF	QF ('18, '19, '23)	
Swiss Open	A						NH	A	1R	1R	1R ('22, '23)	
Spain Masters	NH				A			1R	NH	1R	1R ('21, '23)	
Orléans Masters	N/A				2R	A	NH	2R	QF	1R	QF ('22)	
Thailand Open	NH	A			1R	A		NH	QF	A	QF ('22)	
Singapore Open	A				SF	A	NH		A		SF ('18)	
Chinese Taipei Open	A				2R	1R	NH		A		2R ('18)	
Australian Open	A					2R	NH		1R	A	2R ('19)	
Indonesia Masters Super 100	N/A				1R	A	NH		QF		QF ('22)	
Korea Masters	A				QF	A	NH		A		QF ('18)	
Fuzhou China Open	A				1R	A	NH				1R ('18)	
Akita Masters	N/A				QF	A	NH				QF ('18)	
Hyderabad Open	N/A				W	A	NH		NA		W ('18)	
Macau Open	A				SF	A	NH			NA	SF ('18)	
New Zealand Open	A					2R	NH			NA	2R ('19)	
Year-end ranking	551	205	521	—N/a	30	183	199	171	48		25	
Tournament	2014	2015	2016	2017	2018	2019	2020	2021	2022	2023	Best	Ref
