= Shiori Saito =

Japanese badminton player

Shiori Saitō
Personal information
- Born: 14 February 1998 (age 28) Saitama Prefecture, Japan
- Height: 1.69 m (5 ft 7 in)
- Weight: 64 kg (141 lb)

Sport
- Country: Japan
- Sport: Badminton
- Handedness: Right

Women's singles
- Highest ranking: 53 (5 April 2018)
- BWF profile
Medal record
Women's badminton
Representing Japan
Asian Junior Championships
Bronze medal – third place	2015 Bangkok	Mixed team

Shiori Saito (齋藤 栞, Saitō Shiori; born 14 February 1998) is a Japanese badminton player who plays for the Plenty Global Linx badminton team. She was the women's singles champion at the 2016 Sydney International, and in 2017 she was selected for the B squad of the Japan national team.

== Achievements ==
=== BWF World Tour (1 title, 1 runner-up) ===
The BWF World Tour, which was announced on 19 March 2017 and implemented in 2018, is a series of elite badminton tournaments sanctioned by the Badminton World Federation (BWF). The BWF World Tour is divided into levels of World Tour Finals, Super 1000, Super 750, Super 500, Super 300 (part of the HSBC World Tour), and the BWF Tour Super 100.

Women's singles
Year	Tournament	Level	Opponent	Score	Result	Ref.
2018	Bangka Belitung Indonesia Masters	Super 100	(Japan) Minatsu Mitani	16–21, 12–21	(silver) Runner-up	
2018	Orléans Masters	Super 100	(Denmark) Mia Blichfeldt	21–18, 21–14	(gold) Winner	

=== BWF International Challenge/Series (6 titles) ===
Women's singles
Year	Tournament	Opponent	Score	Result	Ref.
2016	Sydney International	(China) Xu Wei	21–14, 21–13	(gold) Winner	
2017	Finnish Open	(Japan) Mako Urushizaki	21–8, 21–10	(gold) Winner	
2017	Indonesia International	(Indonesia) Asty Dwi Widyaningrum	21–15, 21–15	(gold) Winner	
2018	Indonesia International	(South Korea) An Se-young	21–12, 21–13	(gold) Winner	
2022	North Harbour International	(Japan) Hirari Mizui	21–19, 21–19	(gold) Winner	
2023	Osaka International	(Japan) Hina Akechi	21–15, 21–13	(gold) Winner	

BWF International Challenge tournament
BWF International Series tournament
