= Hari Kiran Chereddi =

- Hari Kiran Chereddi
- Born: Hyderabad, India
- Citizenship: Indian
- Education: Osmania University (Bachelor of Engineering), California State University (MBA)
- Occupations: Managing Director of HRV Pharma & CEO of New Horizon Global Pharma
- Board member of: Hyderabad Angels
- Awards: Forbes Global CEO List (2010, 2011, 2012)

Hari Kiran Chereddi is an Indian Businessman. He is the managing director of HRV Pharma and the CEO of New Horizon Global Pharma. Previously, he served as the managing director of Sujana Energy Limited, a company specializing in LED lighting and renewable energy solutions.

== Early life and education ==
Hari Kiran Chereddi was born in Hyderabad, India.

He earned a degree in Computer Science Engineering from Osmania University and later pursued an MBA in Supply Chain Management and Finance from California State University.

He is also pursuing his Owner/President Management (OPM) program at Harvard Business School.

During his academic years, he developed a strong interest in business operations and technology-driven solutions, which later influenced his career in entrepreneurship and supply chain management.

== Business career ==
Hari Kiran Chereddi began his career as the Head of Business Management Operations at Bank of America in India, where he gained experience in corporate operations and financial management.

He later founded Sujana Energy, a renewable energy company specializing in advanced LED lighting solutions, solar energy products, and renewable power generation systems. His work in this sector focused on energy efficiency and sustainability, with the company working on major projects across India.

Hari Kiran Chereddi also played a key role in his family's pharmaceutical business as the executive director of Sriam Labs, a contract research and manufacturing firm. Under his leadership, Sriam Labs expanded its operations before being acquired by Laurus Labs, a company now listed on the National Stock Exchange of India (NSE) and Bombay Stock Exchange (BSE).

Hari Kiran Chereddi is an active member of the Confederation of Indian Industry (CII) Energy & Environment Panel, where he contributes to energy efficiency policies and sustainable business practices. He is also a member of India's National Energy Efficiency Standards Committee and the National LED Lighting Standards Committee, where he works on setting industry benchmarks for sustainable lighting technologies.

Currently, Hari Kiran Chereddi is the managing director of HRV Global Life Sciences Pvt Ltd (HRV Pharma), a company specializing in pharmaceuticals and life sciences solutions. Under his leadership, HRV Global has received multiple accolades, including two prestigious Leadership Awards recognizing it as one of the leading pharmaceutical firms in India and the Middle East.

== Badminton ==
Hari Kiran Chereddi is also an accomplished badminton player, having represented India in multiple national and international tournaments. Hari has competed in over 25 international badminton tournaments, including events sanctioned by the Badminton World Federation (BWF). He achieved a world ranking of 204 in Men's Doubles and 33 in the BWF World Tour Men's Doubles rankings. Additionally, he has represented India in senior National Championships, facing some of the country's top-ranked players.

== Philanthropy & Social Initiatives ==
Hari Kiran Chereddi has been actively involved in various philanthropic and social initiatives. He has served on the prestigious Columbia Law School Task Force, promoting US-India clean energy investments. Additionally, he has been a member of the Confederation of Indian Industries (CII), the Bureau of Indian Standards, and the Bureau of Energy Efficiency, contributing to policy-making and implementation in energy efficiency and standards.

== Investments & Entrepreneurship ==
As an angel investor, Hari Kiran Chereddi has played a significant role in mentoring and funding startups and emerging businesses. He is associated with Hyderabad Angels, where he contributes to the startup ecosystem by providing guidance and capital to budding entrepreneurs.

== Awards & Recognitions ==
Throughout his career, Hari Kiran Chereddi has received several awards and recognitions. Notably, he was listed in the Forbes Global CEO list in 2010, 2011, and 2012. In 2022, under his leadership, HRV Global Life Sciences(HRV Pharma) was honored with the Middle East Healthcare Leadership Award for "Best Pharmaceutical Market Expansion Company" and the "ET Global Indian Leaders Award 2022" for excellence in the field of pharmaceuticals.
