= Hyderabad Open (badminton) =

Badminton tournament in India

- Founded: 2018; 8 years ago
- Editions: 2 (2019)
- Location: Hyderabad; India
- Venue: G. M. C. Balayogi Indoor Stadium (2019)
- Prize money: US$75,000 (2019)

Men's
- Draw: 48S / 32D
- Current champions: Sourabh Verma (singles); Muhammad Shohibul Fikri; Bagas Maulana (doubles)

Women's
- Draw: 32S / 32D
- Current champions: Yeo Jia Min (singles); Baek Ha-na; Jung Kyung-eun (doubles)

Mixed doubles
- Draw: 32
- Current champions: Hoo Pang Ron; Cheah Yee See

Super 100
- Al Ain Masters; Akita Masters (2018–2019); Baoji China Masters; Dutch Open (2018–2019); Hyderabad Open (2018–2019); Indonesia Masters Super 100; Kaohsiung Masters; Malaysia Super 100; Guwahati Masters; Odisha Masters; Ruichang China Masters; Russian Open (2018–2019); Scottish Open (2018); Vietnam Open

Last completed
- 2019 Hyderabad Open

The Hyderabad Open was an annual badminton tournament held in India. This tournament was a part of the BWF World Tour tournaments and is leveled in BWF Tour Super 100.

== Venue and host city ==
- 2018–2019: G. M. C. Balayogi Indoor Stadium, Hyderabad, Telangana
Locations of Hyderabad Open host cities

== Past winners ==
Year	Men's singles	Women's singles	Men's doubles	Women's doubles	Mixed doubles
2018	(India) Sameer Verma	(South Korea) Kim Ga-eun	(India) Satwiksairaj Rankireddy (India) Chirag Shetty	(Hong Kong) Ng Tsz Yau (Hong Kong) Yuen Sin Ying	(Indonesia) Akbar Bintang Cahyono (Indonesia) Winny Oktavina Kandow
2019	(India) Sourabh Verma	(Singapore) Yeo Jia Min	(Indonesia) Muhammad Shohibul Fikri (Indonesia) Bagas Maulana	(South Korea) Baek Ha-na (South Korea) Jung Kyung-eun	(Malaysia) Hoo Pang Ron (Malaysia) Cheah Yee See
2020	Cancelled (Note: This tournament, originally to be played from 11 to 16 August, was later postponed due to the COVID-19 pandemic in India.)				
2021	Cancelled (Note: This tournament, originally to be played from 24 to 29 August, was later cancelled due to COVID-19 pandemic in India.)				

== Performance by nations ==
As of the 2019 edition

Pos	Nation	MS	WS	MD	WD	XD	Total
1	India	2		1			3
2	Indonesia			1		1	2
2	South Korea		1		1		2
4	Hong Kong				1		1
4	Malaysia					1	1
4	Singapore		1				1
Total		2	2	2	2	2	10

== See also ==
- India Open
- Syed Modi International Badminton Championships
- Odisha Masters
- Guwahati Masters
- India International Challenge
