= Akita Masters =

Badminton tournament held in Japan

- Official website
- Founded: 2018; 8 years ago
- Editions: 2 (2019)
- Location: Akita; Japan
- Venue: CNA Arena Akita (2019)
- Prize money: US$75,000 (2019)

Men's
- Draw: 48S / 32D
- Current champions: Firman Abdul Kholik (singles); Ou Xuanyi; Zhang Nan (doubles)
- Most singles titles: 1 Sitthikom Thammasin; Firman Abdul Kholik
- Most doubles titles: 1 Akbar Bintang Cahyono; Muhammad Reza Pahlevi Isfahani; Ou Xuanyi; Zhang Nan

Women's
- Draw: 32S / 32D
- Current champions: An Se-young (singles); Ayako Sakuramoto; Yukiko Takahata (doubles)
- Most singles titles: 1 Sayaka Takahashi; An Se-young
- Most doubles titles: 2 Ayako Sakuramoto; Yukiko Takahata

Mixed doubles
- Draw: 32
- Current champions: Ko Sung-hyun; Eom Hye-won
- Most titles (male): 1 Kohei Gondo; Ko Sung-hyun
- Most titles (female): 1 Ayane Kurihara; Eom Hye-won

Super 100
- Al Ain Masters; Akita Masters (2018–2019); Baoji China Masters; Dutch Open (2018–2019); Hyderabad Open (2018–2019); Indonesia Masters Super 100; Kaohsiung Masters; Malaysia Super 100; Guwahati Masters; Odisha Masters; Ruichang China Masters; Russian Open (2018–2019); Scottish Open (2018); Vietnam Open

Last completed
- 2019 Akita Masters

The Akita Masters (Japanese: 秋田マスタ－ズ) was an annual badminton tournament contested in Akita City, Japan. This tournament was a part of the BWF World Tour tournaments and was leveled in BWF Tour Super 100.

== Venue & host city ==
- 2018–2019: CNA Arena Akita, Akita City

== Past winners ==
Year	Men's singles	Women's singles	Men's doubles	Women's doubles	Mixed doubles
2018	(Thailand) Sitthikom Thammasin	(Japan) Sayaka Takahashi	(Indonesia) Akbar Bintang Cahyono (Indonesia) Muhammad Reza Pahlevi Isfahani	(Japan) Ayako Sakuramoto (Japan) Yukiko Takahata	(Japan) Kohei Gondo (Japan) Ayane Kurihara
2019	(Indonesia) Firman Abdul Kholik	(South Korea) An Se-young	(China) Ou Xuanyi (China) Zhang Nan	(Japan) Ayako Sakuramoto (Japan) Yukiko Takahata	(South Korea) Ko Sung-hyun (South Korea) Eom Hye-won
2020	Cancelled (Note: This tournament, originally to be played from 18 to 23 August, was later cancelled due to the COVID-19 pandemic in Japan.)				
2021	Cancelled (Note: This tournament, originally to be played from 17 to 22 August, was later cancelled due to the COVID-19 pandemic in Japan.)				
2022	Cancelled (Note: This tournament, originally to be played from 26 to 31 July, was later cancelled due to the COVID-19 pandemic in Japan.)				

== Performances by nation ==
As of the 2019 edition

Pos	Nation	MS	WS	MD	WD	XD	Total
1	Japan		1		2	1	4
2	Indonesia	1		1			2
2	South Korea		1			1	2
4	China			1			1
4	Thailand	1					1
Total		2	2	2	2	2	10

Host nation
