= 2016 Chinese Taipei Open Grand Prix Gold =

Tournament details
- Dates: 28 June – 3 July 2016
- Level: Grand Prix Gold
- Total prize money: US$200,000
- Venue: Taipei Arena
- Location: Taipei, Chinese Taipei

Champions
- Men's singles: (Chinese Taipei) Chou Tien-chen
- Women's singles: (Chinese Taipei) Tai Tzu-ying
- Men's doubles: (China) Li Junhui (China) Liu Yuchen
- Women's doubles: (China) Huang Dongping (China) Zhong Qianxin
- Mixed doubles: (China) Zheng Siwei (China) Chen Qingchen

The 2016 Chinese Taipei Open Grand Prix Gold, parallel with the 2016 Canada Open Grand Prix, is the eighth/ninth Grand Prix's badminton tournament of the 2016 BWF Grand Prix and Grand Prix Gold. The tournament will be held at the Taipei Arena in Taipei, Chinese Taipei on 28 June – 3 July 2016 and has a total purse of $200,000.

== Men's singles ==
=== Seeds ===
1. (China) Chen Long (withdrew)
2. (Malaysia) Lee Chong Wei (withdrew)
3. (China) Lin Dan (withdrew)
4. (China) Tian Houwei (third round)
5. (Chinese Taipei) Chou Tien-chen (champion)
6. (Hong Kong) Ng Ka Long (third round)
7. (Hong Kong) Hu Yun (first round)
8. (Hong Kong) Wei Nan (quarterfinal)
9. (Thailand) Boonsak Ponsana (third round)
10. (Hong Kong) Wong Wing Ki (quarterfinal)
11. (Chinese Taipei) Hsu Jen-hao (first round)
12. (Thailand) Tanongsak Saensomboonsuk (semifinal)
13. (Malaysia) Iskandar Zulkarnain Zainuddin (semifinal)
14. (Indonesia) Sony Dwi Kuncoro (first round)
15. (India) Sameer Verma (first round)
16. (Chinese Taipei) Wang Tzu-wei (second round)

=== Finals ===
Quarterfinals
13	(Malaysia) Iskandar Zulkarnain Zainuddin	21	21
(Thailand) Khosit Phetpradab	17	18
10	(Hong Kong) Wong Wing Ki	21	22	18
5	(Chinese Taipei) Chou Tien-chen	19	24	21
8	(Hong Kong) Wei Nan	21	13	17
12	(Thailand) Tanongsak Saensomboonsuk	18	21	21
(China) Qiao Bin	21	21
(Chinese Taipei) Lin Yu-hsien	11	18

Semifinals
13	(Malaysia) Iskandar Zulkarnain Zainuddin	16	10
5	(Chinese Taipei) Chou Tien-chen	21	21
12	(Thailand) Tanongsak Saensomboonsuk	11	16
(China) Qiao Bin	21	21

Final
5	(Chinese Taipei) Chou Tien-chen	21	21
(China) Qiao Bin	18	17

=== Top half ===
==== Section 1 ====
First Round
PFQ	(Chinese Taipei) Kuo C-h	12	19
(Malaysia) Liew D	21	21
(Chinese Taipei) Shih K-c	13	21	21
(South Africa) J Maliekal	21	18	17
13	(Malaysia) I Z Zainuddin	21	21
(Indonesia) F A Kholik	19	11
(Singapore) Derek Wong Z L	21	21
Q8	(Chinese Taipei) Lu C-y	16	19

Second Round
(Malaysia) Liew D	21	21
(Chinese Taipei) Shih K-c	18	14
13	(Malaysia) I Z Zainuddin	21	21
(Singapore) Derek Wong Z L	10	14

Third Round
(Malaysia) Liew D	21	21	21
13	(Malaysia) I Z Zainuddin	23	19	23

==== Section 2 ====
First Round
7	(Hong Kong) Hu Y	13	8
(India) S Dey	21	21
Q7	(Chinese Taipei) Lo C-y	17	17
(Russia) V Malkov	21	21
16	(Chinese Taipei) Wang T-w	21	21
(Indonesia) M B Pangisthu	12	9
(Chinese Taipei) Yang Y-h	9	17
(Thailand) K Phetpradab	21	21

Second Round
(India) S Dey	8	10
(Russia) V Malkov	21	21
16	(Chinese Taipei) Wang T-w	16	21	17
(Thailand) K Phetpradab	21	19	21

Third Round
(Russia) V Malkov	21	16	10
(Thailand) K Phetpradab	7	21	21

==== Section 3 ====
First Round
4	(China) Tian HW	21	21
(Indonesia) K H Wibowo	8	7
(Malaysia) Tan C S	21	21
PFQ	(Thailand) M Narongrit	19	17
10	(Hong Kong) Wong W K	21	21
(Malaysia) Chiang J S	8	4
(Thailand) A Namkul	20	21	16
(Chinese Taipei) Hsu J-t	22	10	21

Second Round
4	(China) Tian HW	21	21
(Malaysia) Tan C S	12	10
10	(Hong Kong) Wong W K	21	21
(Chinese Taipei) Hsu J-t	11	8

Third Round
4	(China) Tian HW	18	10
10	(Hong Kong) Wong W K	21	21

==== Section 4 ====
First Round
5	(Chinese Taipei) Chou T-c	21	21
(Indonesia) F I Hadmadi	12	8
(Chinese Taipei) Cheng P-w	22	19	19
(Malaysia) Goh G C	20	21	21
9	(Thailand) B Ponsana	21	21
(South Korea) Seo S-j	18	18
(Malaysia) Chong W F	17	13
(China) Huang YX	21	21

Second Round
5	(Chinese Taipei) Chou T-c	21	21
(Malaysia) Goh G C	14	18
9	(Thailand) B Ponsana	21	21
(China) Huang YX	14	18

Third Round
5	(Chinese Taipei) Chou T-c	21	21
9	(Thailand) B Ponsana	16	11

=== Bottom half ===
==== Section 5 ====
First Round
(India) K Dharmamer	11	9
(China) Shi YQ	21	21
Q6	(Chinese Taipei) Chu H-c	w	/	o
15	(India) S Verma
Q1	(Hong Kong) Lee C W	9	14
(Hong Kong) Lee C Y	21	21
(India) S Jaiswal	21	20	15
8	(Hong Kong) Wei N	19	22	21

Second Round
(China) Shi YQ	21	21
Q6	(Chinese Taipei) Chu H-c	14	9
(Hong Kong) Lee C Y	21	14	17
8	(Hong Kong) Wei N	14	21	21

Third Round
(China) Shi YQ	19	21	19
8	(Hong Kong) Wei N	21	6	21

==== Section 6 ====
First Round
(Chinese Taipei) Lu C-h	10	11
(India) A Yelegar	21	21
(Chinese Taipei) Lee C-h	17	20
12	(Thailand) T Saensomboonsuk	21	22
Q2	(Chinese Taipei) Teng S-h	14	15
(Malaysia) Goh S H	21	21
Q5	(Chinese Taipei) Hsueh H-y	21	21
PFQ	(South Korea) Ha Y-w	14	17

Second Round
(India) A Yelegar	18	17
12	(Thailand) T Saensomboonsuk	21	21
(Malaysia) Goh S H	15	16
Q5	(Chinese Taipei) Hsueh H-y	21	21

Third Round
12	(Thailand) T Saensomboonsuk	12	21	21
Q5	(Chinese Taipei) Hsueh H-y	21	17	14

==== Section 7 ====
First Round
(Chinese Taipei) Yang C-h	21	21
Q3	(Chinese Taipei) Liang H-c	16	16
(China) Qiao B	21	21
11	(Chinese Taipei) Hsu J-h	16	14
(Malaysia) M A Abdul Latif	21	21
(Chinese Taipei) Chi Y-j	18	17
(India) S Varma	16	21	15
6	(Hong Kong) Ng K L	21	11	21

Second Round
(Chinese Taipei) Yang C-h	12	7
(China) Qiao B	21	21
(Malaysia) M A Abdul Latif	17	8
6	(Hong Kong) Ng K L	21	21

Third Round
(China) Qiao B	21	21
6	(Hong Kong) Ng K L	12	10

==== Section 8 ====
First Round
(South Korea) Heo K-h	18	21	21
(Indonesia) A Marteen	21	13	11
(Chinese Taipei) Lin Y-h	17	21	21
14	(Indonesia) S D Kuncoro	21	8	18
Q4	(Malaysia) Tan T H	3
(Chinese Taipei) Lin C-h	1^{r}
(South Korea) Kim D-h	19	23	17
PFQ	(Chinese Taipei) Yang C-c	21	21	21

Second Round
(South Korea) Heo K-h	17	15
(Chinese Taipei) Lin Y-h	21	21
Q4	(Malaysia) Tan T H	10	11
PFQ	(Chinese Taipei) Yang C-c	21	21

Third Round
(Chinese Taipei) Lin Y-h	18	21	21
PFQ	(Chinese Taipei) Yang C-c	21	14	17

== Women's singles ==
=== Seeds ===
1. (China) Wang Shixian (final)
2. (Chinese Taipei) Tai Tzu-ying (champion)
3. (China) Sun Yu (quarterfinal)
4. (China) He Bingjiao (semifinal)
5. (Thailand) Porntip Buranaprasertsuk (first round)
6. (Thailand) Busanan Ongbamrungphan (second round)
7. (Chinese Taipei) Pai Yu-po (second round)
8. (Thailand) Nichaon Jindapon (semifinal)

=== Finals ===
Semifinals
1	(China) Wang Shixian	21	17	21
4	(China) He Bingjiao	18	21	18
8	(Thailand) Nichaon Jindapon	15	14
2	(Chinese Taipei) Tai Tzu-ying	21	21

Final
1	(China) Wang Shixian	21	6
2	(Chinese Taipei) Tai Tzu-ying	23	21

=== Top half ===
==== Section 1 ====
First Round
1	(China) Wang SX	21	21
Q4	(Chinese Taipei) Hung S-h	14	16
PFQ	(Australia) J Tam	10	10
Q3	(South Korea) Kim N-y	21	21
6	(Thailand) B Ongbumrungpan	21	18	21
(Chinese Taipei) Chiang M-h	12	21	11
(China) Chen YF	21	21
(Indonesia) Fitriani	14	16

Second Round
1	(China) Wang SX	21	19	21
Q3	(South Korea) Kim N-y	11	21	12
6	(Thailand) B Ongbumrungpan	18	18
(China) Chen YF	21	21

Quarterfinals
1	(China) Wang SX	21	21
(China) Chen YF	15	9

==== Section 2 ====
First Round
4	(China) He BJ	21	23	21
(Chinese Taipei) Chen H-h	19	25	10
(Hong Kong) Yip P Y	21	21
(South Korea) Kim H-m	19	14
7	(Chinese Taipei) Pai Y-p	21	21
(Thailand) S Katethong	16	7
Q2	(Chinese Taipei) Jhou S-j	19	21	18
(Thailand) P Chochuwong	21	16	21

Second Round
4	(China) He BJ	19	21	21
(Hong Kong) Yip P Y	21	18	14
7	(Chinese Taipei) Pai Y-p	21	20	18
(Thailand) P Chochuwong	14	22	21

Quarterfinals
4	(China) He BJ	8	21	21
(Thailand) P Chochuwong	21	14	8

=== Bottom half ===
==== Section 3 ====
First Round
(Indonesia) D D Ayustine	21	0
(Chinese Taipei) Lee C-h	7	0^{r}
(Singapore) Liang XY	18	15
8	(Thailand) N Jindapon	21	21
(India) P. C. Thulasi	21	15	18
(Indonesia) H Ramadini	17	21	21
(Australia) Wendy Chen H-y	9	16
3	(China) Sun Y	21	21

Second Round
(Indonesia) D D Ayustine	12	10
8	(Thailand) N Jindapon	21	21
(Indonesia) H Ramadini	5	6
3	(China) Sun Y	21	21

Quarterfinals
8	(Thailand) N Jindapon	21	21
3	(China) Sun Y	19	19

==== Section 4 ====
First Round
(Chinese Taipei) Sung S-y	13	8
(Malaysia) Ho Y M	21	21
(South Korea) Lee J-m	21	21
5	(Thailand) P Buranaprasertsuk	15	12
(Chinese Taipei) Hsu Y-c	17	16
Q1	(China) Gao FJ	21	21
(Hong Kong) Cheung N Y	11	11
2	(Chinese Taipei) Tai T-y	21	21

Second Round
(Malaysia) Ho Y M	21	8	21
(South Korea) Lee J-m	18	21	18
Q1	(China) Gao FJ	15	11
2	(Chinese Taipei) Tai T-y	21	21

Quarterfinals
(Malaysia) Ho Y M	9	12
2	(Chinese Taipei) Tai T-y	21	21

== Men's doubles ==
=== Seeds ===
1. (China) Li Junhui / Liu Yuchen (champion)
2. (Malaysia) Goh V Shem / Tan Wee Kiong (quarterfinal)
3. (Chinese Taipei) Lee Sheng-mu / Tsai Chia-hsin (semifinal)
4. (Chinese Taipei) Chen Hung-ling / Wang Chi-lin (final)
5. (China) Huang Kaixiang / Zheng Siwei (semifinal)
6. (Thailand) Bodin Issara / Nipitphon Puangpuapech (quarterfinal)
7. (Chinese Taipei) Lee Jhe-huei / Lee Yang (first round)
8. (Indonesia) Hendra Aprida Gunawan / Markis Kido (first round)

=== Finals ===
Semifinals
1	(China) Li Junhui (China) Liu Yuchen	21	21
3	(Chinese Taipei) Lee Sheng-mu (Chinese Taipei) Tsai Chia-hsin	15	19
4	(Chinese Taipei) Chen Hung-ling (Chinese Taipei) Wang Chi-lin	21	21	21
5	(China) Huang Kaixiang (China) Zheng Siwei	15	23	16

Final
1	(China) Li Junhui (China) Liu Yuchen	21	17	24
4	(Chinese Taipei) Chen Hung-ling (Chinese Taipei) Wang Chi-lin	17	21	22

=== Top half ===
==== Section 1 ====
First Round
1	(China) Li JH (China) Liu YC	23	21
(Chinese Taipei) Liao K-h (Chinese Taipei) Lu C-p	21	16
Q2	(Malaysia) Lim K W (Malaysia) Ong J G	21	21
(Thailand) S Anugritayawon (Thailand) C Charoenkitamorn	10	15
7	(Chinese Taipei) Lee J-h (Chinese Taipei) Lee Y	14	19
(Indonesia) Hardianto (Indonesia) K A Haryanto	21	21
(Chinese Taipei) Liu W-c (Chinese Taipei) Yang P-h	21	15	21
(South Korea) Chung E-s (South Korea) Kim D-e	16	21	17

Second Round
1	(China) Li JH (China) Liu YC	21	21
Q2	(Malaysia) Lim K W (Malaysia) Ong J G	17	19
(Indonesia) Hardianto (Indonesia) K A Haryanto	21	21
(Chinese Taipei) Liu W-c (Chinese Taipei) Yang P-h	13	19

Quarterfinals
1	(China) Li JH (China) Liu YC	19	21	21
(Indonesia) Hardianto (Indonesia) K A Haryanto	21	5	13

==== Section 2 ====
First Round
3	(Chinese Taipei) Lee S-m (Chinese Taipei) Tsai C-h	19	21	21
(Hong Kong) Chan T K (Hong Kong) Law C H	21	9	16
Q1	(Malaysia) N M A Ayub (Malaysia) J Singh	12	12
(Indonesia) W Nayaka (Indonesia) H Faisal	21	21
6	(Thailand) B Issara (Thailand) N Puangpuapech	21	21
Q3	(Hong Kong) Chung Y (Hong Kong) Tan C H	15	16
(Malaysia) Hoon T H (Malaysia) Teo K S	21	22
(Chinese Taipei) Lin S-k (Chinese Taipei) Lu C-y	15	20

Second Round
3	(Chinese Taipei) Lee S-m (Chinese Taipei) Tsai C-h	21	25
(Indonesia) W Nayaka (Indonesia) H Faisal	13	23
6	(Thailand) B Issara (Thailand) N Puangpuapech	21	19	21
(Malaysia) Hoon T H (Malaysia) Teo K S	15	21	16

Quarterfinals
3	(Chinese Taipei) Lee S-m (Chinese Taipei) Tsai C-h	21	16	21
6	(Thailand) B Issara (Thailand) N Puangpuapech	17	21	15

=== Bottom half ===
==== Section 3 ====
First Round
(Indonesia) F Alfian (Indonesia) M R Ardianto	21	23
Q4	(South Korea) Bae K-y (South Korea) Kim D-y	17	21
(Chinese Taipei) Liao M-c (Chinese Taipei) Tseng M-h	21	16
8	(Indonesia) H A Gunawan (Indonesia) M Kido	18	13^{r}
(Thailand) N Singrueang (Thailand) P Thongnuam	9	4^{r}
(South Korea) Choi S-g (South Korea) Kim J-h	21	10
(Thailand) W Ampunsuwan (Thailand) T Isriyanet	11	12
4	(Chinese Taipei) Chen H-l (Chinese Taipei) Wang C-l	21	21

Second Round
(Indonesia) F Alfian (Indonesia) M R Ardianto	21	21
(Chinese Taipei) Liao M-c (Chinese Taipei) Tseng M-h	17	19
(South Korea) Choi S-g (South Korea) Kim J-h	20	18
4	(Chinese Taipei) Chen H-l (Chinese Taipei) Wang C-l	22	21

Quarterfinals
(Indonesia) F Alfian (Indonesia) M R Ardianto	23	20
4	(Chinese Taipei) Chen H-l (Chinese Taipei) Wang C-l	25	22

==== Section 4 ====
First Round
(Chinese Taipei) Su C-h (Chinese Taipei) Yang P-h	21	21
(Hong Kong) Or C C (Hong Kong) Tang C M	15	19
(Chinese Taipei) Chang K-c (Chinese Taipei) Liang J-w	14	23	15
5	(China) Huang KX (China) Zheng SW	21	21	21
(Malaysia) Ong Y S (Malaysia) Teo E Y	21	21
(Indonesia) Hantoro (Indonesia) Y R Sugiarto	10	8
(Chinese Taipei) Lin C-y (Chinese Taipei) Wu H-l	13	21	17
2	(Malaysia) Goh V S (Malaysia) Tan W K	21	16	21

Second Round
(Chinese Taipei) Su C-h (Chinese Taipei) Yang P-h	20	18
5	(China) Huang KX (China) Zheng SW	22	21
(Malaysia) Ong Y S (Malaysia) Teo E Y	19	18
2	(Malaysia) Goh V S (Malaysia) Tan W K	21	21

Quarterfinals
5	(China) Huang KX (China) Zheng SW	21	21
2	(Malaysia) Goh V S (Malaysia) Tan W K	14	19

== Women's doubles ==
=== Seeds ===
1. (China) Luo Ying / Luo Yu (final)
2. (China) Chen Qingchen / Jia Yifan (semifinal)
3. (Thailand) Jongkolphan Kititharakul / Rawinda Prajongjai (second round)
4. (Malaysia) Vivian Hoo Kah Mun / Woon Khe Wei (second round)

=== Finals ===
Semifinals
1	(China) Luo Ying (China) Luo Yu	22	21
(Thailand) Chayanit Chaladchalam (Thailand) Phataimas Muenwong	20	19
(China) Huang Dongping (China) Zhong Qianxin	21	21
2	(China) Chen Qingchen (China) Jia Yifan	16	18

Final
1	(China) Luo Ying (China) Luo Yu	18	16
(China) Huang Dongping (China) Zhong Qianxin	21	21

=== Top half ===
==== Section 1 ====
First Round
1	(China) Luo Y (China) Luo Y
BYE
(South Korea) Chae Y-j (South Korea) Kim J-w	w	/	o
(Indonesia) A S Awanda (Indonesia) N K Mahadewi Istirani
(South Korea) Kim H-r (South Korea) Yoo H-w	21	21
(Hong Kong) Ng W Y (Hong Kong) Yuen S Y	8	10
(Indonesia) N Herloardjo (Indonesia) R S Putri	13	11
(Chinese Taipei) Chang Y-h (Chinese Taipei) Kuo Y-w	21	21

Second Round
1	(China) Luo Y (China) Luo Y	w	/	o
(South Korea) Chae Y-j (South Korea) Kim J-w
(South Korea) Kim H-r (South Korea) Yoo H-w	19	21	21
(Chinese Taipei) Chang Y-h (Chinese Taipei) Kuo Y-w	21	10	5

Quarterfinals
1	(China) Luo Y (China) Luo Y	21	21
(South Korea) Kim H-r (South Korea) Yoo H-w	17	15

==== Section 2 ====
First Round
4	(Malaysia) Vivian Hoo K M (Malaysia) Woon K W
BYE
(Chinese Taipei) Hsieh P-c (Chinese Taipei) Wu T-j	17	16
(Thailand) C Chaladchalam (Thailand) P Muenwong	21	21
(Chinese Taipei) Hu L-f (Chinese Taipei) Lee C-c	21	21
(Macau) Kuan C L (Macau) Ng W C	11	7
(Thailand) S Chueboca (Thailand) C Korepap	17	10
(Chinese Taipei) Lin T-y (Chinese Taipei) Chen S-y	21	21

Second Round
4	(Malaysia) Vivian Hoo K M (Malaysia) Woon K W	21	14	14
(Thailand) C Chaladchalam (Thailand) P Muenwong	17	21	21
(Chinese Taipei) Hu L-f (Chinese Taipei) Lee C-c	14	13
(Chinese Taipei) Lin T-y (Chinese Taipei) Chen S-y	21	21

Quarterfinals
(Thailand) C Chaladchalam (Thailand) P Muenwong	21	21
(Chinese Taipei) Lin T-y (Chinese Taipei) Chen S-y	16	17

=== Bottom half ===
==== Section 3 ====
First Round
(Indonesia) T R Nuraidah (Indonesia) R A Pradipta	21	21
(Hong Kong) Cheung Y M (Hong Kong) Fan K Y	13	10
(Chinese Taipei) Chen H-h (Chinese Taipei) Huang M-c	11	17
(Hong Kong) Ng T Y (Hong Kong) Yeung N T	21	21
(Chinese Taipei) Wu F-c (Chinese Taipei) Chiang K-h	12	10
(China) Huang DP (China) Zhong QX	21	21
BYE
3	(Thailand) J Kititharakul (Thailand) R Prajongjai

Second Round
(Indonesia) T R Nuraidah (Indonesia) R A Pradipta	22	21
(Hong Kong) Ng T Y (Hong Kong) Yeung N T	20	17
(China) Huang DP (China) Zhong QX	21	21
3	(Thailand) J Kititharakul (Thailand) R Prajongjai	17	19

Quarterfinals
(Indonesia) T R Nuraidah (Indonesia) R A Pradipta	10	21	17
(China) Huang DP (China) Zhong QX	21	16	21

==== Section 4 ====
First Round
(Chinese Taipei) Hsu Y-c (Chinese Taipei) Pai Y-p	19	21	12
(Malaysia) Chow M K (Malaysia) Lee M Y	21	13	21
(South Korea) Go A-r (South Korea) Kong H-y	19	21	22
(Chinese Taipei) Lin W-c (Chinese Taipei) Lin X-m	21	14	20
(Chinese Taipei) Cheng C-y (Chinese Taipei) Cheng Y-c	12	13
(Indonesia) D D Haris (Indonesia) R E Putri Sari	21	21
BYE
2	(China) Chen QC (China) Jia YF

Second Round
(Malaysia) Chow M K (Malaysia) Lee M Y	10	11
(South Korea) Go A-r (South Korea) Kong H-y	21	21
(Indonesia) D D Haris (Indonesia) R E Putri Sari	11	9
2	(China) Chen QC (China) Jia YF	21	21

Quarterfinals
(South Korea) Go A-r (South Korea) Kong H-y	16	11
2	(China) Chen QC (China) Jia YF	21	21

== Mixed doubles ==
=== Seeds ===
1. (Malaysia) Chan Peng Soon / Goh Liu Ying (quarterfinal)
2. (Hong Kong) Lee Chun Hei / Chau Hoi Wah (quarterfinal)
3. (Thailand) Bodin Issara / Savitree Amitrapai (first round)
4. (Indonesia) Ronald Alexander / Melati Daeva Oktaviani (second round)
5. (China) Zheng Siwei / Chen Qingchen (champion)
6. (China) Huang Kaixiang / Huang Dongping (first round)
7. (Chinese Taipei) Liao Min-chun / Chen Hsiao-huan (first round)
8. (South Korea) Kim Dae-eun / Go Ah-ra (quarterfinal)

=== Finals ===
Semifinals
5	(China) Zheng Siwei (China) Chen Qingchen	21	21
(Indonesia) Hafiz Faisal (Indonesia) Shella Devi Aulia	14	13
(Indonesia) Riky Widianto (Indonesia) Gloria Emanuelle Widjaja	17	20
(Malaysia) Tan Kian Meng (Malaysia) Lai Pei Jing	21	22

Final
5	(China) Zheng Siwei (China) Chen Qingchen	21	21
(Malaysia) Tan Kian Meng (Malaysia) Lai Pei Jing	13	16

=== Top half ===
==== Section 1 ====
First Round
1	(Malaysia) Chan P S (Malaysia) Goh L Y	21	21
(Hong Kong) Tang C M (Hong Kong) Tse Y S	13	14
(China) Liu YC (China) Jia YF	18	21	16
(Indonesia) A E Prasetya (Indonesia) A Saufika	21	19	21
5	(China) Zheng SW (China) Chen QC	21	21
(Hong Kong) Yeung S C (Hong Kong) Yeung N T	11	9
(Chinese Taipei) Yang P-h (Chinese Taipei) Yang C-t	21	21
(Indonesia) A Firmansyah (Indonesia) R S Putri	12	14

Second Round
1	(Malaysia) Chan P S (Malaysia) Goh L Y	21	21
(Indonesia) A E Prasetya (Indonesia) A Saufika	15	17
5	(China) Zheng SW (China) Chen QC	21	21
(Chinese Taipei) Yang P-h (Chinese Taipei) Yang C-t	10	13

Quarterfinals
1	(Malaysia) Chan P S (Malaysia) Goh L Y	21	17	12
5	(China) Zheng SW (China) Chen QC	12	21	21

==== Section 2 ====
First Round
4	(Indonesia) R Alexander (Indonesia) M D Oktaviani	21	14	21
(Chinese Taipei) Lee Y (Chinese Taipei) Kuo Y-w	16	21	15
(Thailand) P Thongnuam (Thailand) N Saengchote	11	18
(Indonesia) H Faisal (Indonesia) S D Aulia	21	21
8	(South Korea) Kim D-e (South Korea) Go A-r	21	24
(Chinese Taipei) Chang K-c (Chinese Taipei) Chang H-t	16	22
Q2	(Thailand) N Puangpuapech (Thailand) J Kititharakul	15	10
(Chinese Taipei) Lin C-y (Chinese Taipei) Wu T-j	21	21

Second Round
4	(Indonesia) R Alexander (Indonesia) M D Oktaviani	21	17	13
(Indonesia) H Faisal (Indonesia) S D Aulia	10	21	21
8	(South Korea) Kim D-e (South Korea) Go A-r	21	21
(Chinese Taipei) Lin C-y (Chinese Taipei) Wu T-j	11	19

Quarterfinals
(Indonesia) H Faisal (Indonesia) S D Aulia	21	21
8	(South Korea) Kim D-e (South Korea) Go A-r	14	14

=== Bottom half ===
==== Section 3 ====
First Round
(Chinese Taipei) Chen H-l (Chinese Taipei) Hu L-f	11	21	21
Q4	(Hong Kong) Tam C H (Hong Kong) Ng T Y	21	17	17
(Indonesia) R Widianto (Indonesia) G E Widjaja	23	21
7	(Chinese Taipei) Liao M-c (Chinese Taipei) Chen H-h	21	18
(Chinese Taipei) Lee J-h (Chinese Taipei) Hsieh P-c	21	21
(Hong Kong) Li K H (Hong Kong) Ng W Y	8	17
(South Korea) Bae K-y (South Korea) Yoo H-w	21	21
3	(Thailand) B Issara (Thailand) S Amitrapai	19	15

Second Round
(Chinese Taipei) Chen H-l (Chinese Taipei) Hu L-f	10	11
(Indonesia) R Widianto (Indonesia) G E Widjaja	21	21
(Chinese Taipei) Lee J-h (Chinese Taipei) Hsieh P-c	21	21
(South Korea) Bae K-y (South Korea) Yoo H-w	14	16

Quarterfinals
(Indonesia) R Widianto (Indonesia) G E Widjaja	21	21
(Chinese Taipei) Lee J-h (Chinese Taipei) Hsieh P-c	11	18

==== Section 4 ====
First Round
(Indonesia) H Rumengan (Indonesia) N Herloardjo	11	10
Q1	(Chinese Taipei) Wang C-l (Chinese Taipei) Cheng C-y	21	21
(Malaysia) Tan K M (Malaysia) Lai P J	21	21
6	(China) Huang KX (China) Huang DP	12	19
(South Korea) Chung E-s (South Korea) Kim H-r	19	17
(China) Li JH (China) Zhong QX	21	21
Q3	(Chinese Taipei) Lu C-y (Chinese Taipei) Huang M-c	17	19
2	(Hong Kong) Lee C H (Hong Kong) Chau H W	21	21

Second Round
Q1	(Chinese Taipei) Wang C-l (Chinese Taipei) Cheng C-y	18	21	15
(Malaysia) Tan K M (Malaysia) Lai P J	21	14	21
(China) Li JH (China) Zhong QX	12	9
2	(Hong Kong) Lee C H (Hong Kong) Chau H W	21	21

Quarterfinals
(Malaysia) Tan K M (Malaysia) Lai P J	19	21	21
2	(Hong Kong) Lee C H (Hong Kong) Chau H W	21	19	7

Preceded by 2016 China Masters Grand Prix Gold	BWF Grand Prix and Grand Prix Gold; 2016 BWF Season	Succeeded by 2016 U.S. Open Grand Prix Gold
