= 2013 Chinese Taipei Open Grand Prix Gold =

Tournament details
- Dates: September 3, 2013 - September 8, 2013
- Total prize money: US$200,000
- Venue: Hsing Chuang Gymnasium
- Location: Taipei, Chinese Taipei

The 2013 Chinese Taipei Open Grand Prix Gold was the ninth grand prix gold and grand prix tournament of the 2013 BWF Grand Prix Gold and Grand Prix. The tournament was held in Hsing Chuang Gymnasium, Taipei, Chinese Taipei September 3 until September 8, 2013 and had a total purse of $200,000.

== Men's singles ==
=== Seeds ===
1. (Vietnam) Nguyen Tien Minh (final)
2. (Chinese Taipei) Chou Tien-chen (quarter-final)
3. (Denmark) Viktor Axelsen (quarter-final)
4. (Indonesia) Alamsyah Yunus (second round)
5. (Chinese Taipei) Hsu Jen-hao (semi-final)
6. (Malaysia) Mohd Arif Abdul Latif (first round)
7. (Malaysia) Tan Chun Seang (second round)
8. (India) Anand Pawar (second round)
9. (South Korea) Lee Dong-keun (first round)
10. (Thailand) Suppanyu Avihingsanon (third round)
11. (Singapore) Derek Wong Zi Liang (third round)
12. (Singapore) Ashton Chen Yong Zhao (second round)
13. (Israel) Misha Zilberman (third round)
14. (Malaysia) Zulfadli Zulkiffli (third round)
15. (India) Arvind Bhat (withdrew)
16. (United States) Howard Shu (first round)

=== Finals ===
Quarterfinals
1	(Vietnam) Nguyen Tien Minh	21	21
(Thailand) Khosit Phetpradab	9	10
3	(Denmark) Viktor Axelsen	10	16
5	(Chinese Taipei) Hsu Jen-hao	21	21
Q2	(Chinese Taipei) Chi Hung-ming	9	21	16
(Chinese Taipei) Wang Tzu-wei	21	19	21
(South Korea) Shon Wan-ho	21	21
2	(Chinese Taipei) Chou Tien-chen	16	9

Semifinals
1	(Vietnam) Nguyen Tien Minh	21	25
5	(Chinese Taipei) Hsu Jen-hao	16	23
(Chinese Taipei) Wang Tzu-wei	13	5
(South Korea) Shon Wan-ho	21	21

Final
1	(Vietnam) Nguyen Tien Minh	21	9	18
(South Korea) Shon Wan-ho	19	21	21

=== Top half ===
==== Section 1 ====
First Round
1	(Vietnam) Nguyen TM	21	21
(Chinese Taipei) Yang C-h	8	8
(Chinese Taipei) Yang S-j	21	21
(Hong Kong) Tam CH	16	17
14	(Malaysia) Z Zulkiffli	16	21	21
(South Korea) Hwang J-s	21	12	16
(Indonesia) A Ramadhan	15	15
(Chinese Taipei) Wan C-h	21	21

Second Round
1	(Vietnam) Nguyen TM	21	21
(Chinese Taipei) Yang S-j	15	14
14	(Malaysia) Z Zulkiffli	21	21
(Chinese Taipei) Wan C-h	18	15

Third Round
1	(Vietnam) Nguyen TM	21	21
14	(Malaysia) Z Zulkiffli	16	15

==== Section 2 ====
First Round
6	(Malaysia) A Abdul Latif	17	16
(Thailand) K Phetpradab	21	21
(Indonesia) E Sukamta	14	19
(Thailand) P Thongnuam	21	21
10	(Thailand) S Avihingsanon	21	21
(South Korea) Park S-m	17	15
(Malaysia) Wong KY	21	21
(Brunei) J Yu Woon	12	15

Second Round
(Thailand) K Phetpradab	21	21
(Thailand) P Thongnuam	18	9
10	(Thailand) S Avihingsanon	21	21
(Malaysia) Wong KY	7	12

Third Round
(Thailand) K Phetpradab	21	16	21
10	(Thailand) S Avihingsanon	16	21	11

==== Section 3 ====
First Round
3	(Denmark) V Axelsen	23	20	22
(Chinese Taipei) Chu H-c	21	22	20
(Malaysia) Kuan BH	16	21	17
(Indonesia) A Marteen	21	14	21
PFQ	(Malaysia) Teoh KS	20	21	21
PFQ	(Canada) A Lam	22	17	13
(South Korea) Jang H-s	10	14
(Chinese Taipei) Lin C-h	21	21

Second Round
3	(Denmark) V Axelsen	21	21
(Indonesia) A Marteen	17	15
PFQ	(Malaysia) Teoh KS	8	13
(Chinese Taipei) Lin C-h	21	21

Third Round
3	(Denmark) V Axelsen	22	21
(Chinese Taipei) Lin C-h	20	13

==== Section 4 ====
First Round
5	(Chinese Taipei) Hsu J-h	21	21
(Singapore) R Gonansa	10	14
(Chinese Taipei) Cheng P-w	22	21
Q8	(Chinese Taipei) Yang Y-h	20	17
11	(Singapore) D Wong	21	21
Q5	(Chinese Taipei) Fan CM-s	17	16
(Malaysia) Chiang JS	13
(Australia) N Tang	7^{r}

Second Round
5	(Chinese Taipei) Hsu J-h	21	21
(Chinese Taipei) Cheng P-w	10	13
11	(Singapore) D Wong	21	21
(Malaysia) Chiang JS	14	16

Third Round
5	(Chinese Taipei) Hsu J-h	21	21
11	(Singapore) D Wong	10	18

=== Bottom half ===
==== Section 5 ====
First Round
(Malaysia) Loke KP	13	16
Q2	(Chinese Taipei) Chi H-m	21	21
(Malaysia) B Wong	19	21	21
16	(United States) H Shu	21	8	10
(Chinese Taipei) Hsu S-w	21	21
Q6	(Macau) Leong KF	5	10
(Chinese Taipei) Lin Y-h	14	15
8	(India) A Pawar	21	21

Second Round
Q2	(Chinese Taipei) Chi H-m	21	21
(Malaysia) B Wong	14	19
(Chinese Taipei) Hsu S-w	16	21	21
8	(India) A Pawar	21	12	11

Third Round
Q2	(Chinese Taipei) Chi H-m	22	21
(Chinese Taipei) Hsu S-w	20	15

==== Section 6 ====
First Round
(Malaysia) Woon KH	10	17
(Chinese Taipei) Shih K-c	21	21
(Chinese Taipei) Wang T-w	16	21	21
9	(South Korea) Lee D-k	21	16	17
(India) R Yadav	wo
(Indonesia) P Sudrajat
(Thailand) T Sitthikom	15	21	18
4	(Indonesia) A Yunus	21	14	21

Second Round
(Chinese Taipei) Shih K-c	12	13
(Chinese Taipei) Wang T-w	21	21
(Indonesia) P Sudrajat	10	21	22
4	(Indonesia) A Yunus	21	18	20

Third Round
(Chinese Taipei) Wang T-w	21	21
(Indonesia) P Sudrajat	17	7

==== Section 7 ====
First Round
(South Korea) Shon W-h	21	21
Q3	(Chinese Taipei) Wu T-h	14	14
(Chinese Taipei) Lu C-y	16	21	10
12	(Singapore) A Chen	21	16	21
Q4	(South Korea) Kim D-h	11	17
(Chinese Taipei) Lu C-h	21	21
(Singapore) Loh KY	19	17
7	(Malaysia) Tan CS	21	21

Second Round
(South Korea) Shon W-h	20	21	21
12	(Singapore) A Chen	22	14	13
(Chinese Taipei) Lu C-h	21	11	21
7	(Malaysia) Tan CS	19	21	17

Third Round
(South Korea) Shon W-h	21	16	21
(Chinese Taipei) Lu C-h	14	21	7

==== Section 8 ====
First Round
Q7	(Brunei) J Tay	10	7
(New Zealand) J Wu	21	21
(Canada) T Chiu	10	11
13	(Israel) M Zilberman	21	21
(Thailand) P Thongnuam	19	17
(Chinese Taipei) Hsueh H-y	21	21
Q1	(Chinese Taipei) Hsieh F-t	20	14
2	(Chinese Taipei) Chou T-c	22	21

Second Round
(New Zealand) J Wu	6	21
13	(Israel) M Zilberman	21	23
(Chinese Taipei) Hsueh H-y	21	18	15
2	(Chinese Taipei) Chou T-c	11	21	21

Third Round
13	(Israel) M Zilberman	11	21	11
2	(Chinese Taipei) Chou T-c	21	10	21

== Women's singles ==
=== Seeds ===
1. (South Korea) Sung Ji-hyun (champion)
2. (Chinese Taipei) Tai Tzu-ying (final)
3. (Indonesia) Lindaweni Fanetri (first round)
4. (South Korea) Bae Youn-joo (quarter-final)
5. (Thailand) Sapsiree Taerattanachai (quarter-final)
6. (Thailand) Nichaon Jindapon (withdrew)
7. (Thailand) Porntip Buranaprasertsuk (quarter-final)
8. (Thailand) Busanan Ongbumrungpan (semi-final)

=== Finals ===
Semifinals
1	(South Korea) Sung Ji-Hyun	21	21
(Singapore) Gu Juan	15	10
8	(Thailand) Busanan Ongbumrungpan	21	15	19
2	(Chinese Taipei) Tai Tzu-ying	17	21	21

Final
1	(South Korea) Sung Ji-hyun	21	21
2	(Chinese Taipei) Tai Tzu-ying	16	9

=== Top half ===
==== Section 1 ====
First Round
1	(South Korea) Sung J-h	21	21
(Chinese Taipei) Chiang M-h	9	13
(Chinese Taipei) Chang Y-l	21	21
(New Zealand) A Rankin	11	9
7	(Thailand) P Buranaprasertsuk	21	15	21
(Chinese Taipei) Chen H-h	17	21	17
Q1	(South Korea) Jung Y-g	15	17
(Chinese Taipei) Hsu Y-c	21	21

Second Round
1	(South Korea) Sung J-h	21	21
(Chinese Taipei) Chang Y-l	8	12
7	(Thailand) P Buranaprasertsuk	21	21
(Chinese Taipei) Hsu Y-c	13	19

Quarterfinals
1	(South Korea) Sung J-h	23	21
7	(Thailand) P Buranaprasertsuk	21	7

==== Section 2 ====
First Round
3	(Indonesia) L Fanetri	21	18	17
(Chinese Taipei) Lin Y-c	17	21	21
(South Korea) Kim S-j	10	14
(Vietnam) Vu TT	21	21
PFQ	(Chinese Taipei) Tang W-y	21	11	9
(Singapore) Gu J	15	21	21
(Thailand) R Prajongjai	13	17
(Chinese Taipei) Cheng C-y	21	21

Second Round
(Chinese Taipei) Lin Y-c	9	10
(Vietnam) Vu TT	21	21
(Singapore) Gu J	24	21
(Chinese Taipei) Cheng C-y	22	18

Quarterfinals
(Vietnam) Vu TT	18	21	16
(Singapore) Gu J	21	17	21

=== Bottom half ===
==== Section 3 ====
First Round
PFQ	(South Korea) Lee J-m	15	12
(Canada) M Li	21	21
(Indonesia) A Firdasari	16	12
8	(Thailand) B Ongbumrungpan	21	21
Q2	(Chinese Taipei) Yu C-h	21	16	16
PFQ	(Chinese Taipei) Cheng S-c	19	21	21
(Chinese Taipei) Lee C-h	16	12
4	(South Korea) Bae Y-j	21	21

Second Round
(Canada) M Li	11	15
8	(Thailand) B Ongbumrungpan	21	21
PFQ	(Chinese Taipei) Cheng S-c	15	21	17
4	(South Korea) Bae Y-j	21	18	21

Quarterfinals
8	(Thailand) B Ongbumrungpan	19	21	21
4	(South Korea) Bae Y-j	21	17	18

==== Section 4 ====
First Round
(Singapore) Chen JY	21	21
(Thailand) N Saengchote	14	15
(India) T Lad	18	18
5	(Thailand) S Taerattanachai	21	21
Q3	(United States) Zhang BW	21	21
Q4	(Thailand) W Makasasitorn	18	10
(Indonesia) B Manuputty	21	17	13
2	(Chinese Taipei) Tai T-y	15	21	21

Second Round
(Singapore) Chen JY	20	13
5	(Thailand) S Taerattanachai	22	21
Q3	(United States) Zhang BW	19	19
2	(Chinese Taipei) Tai T-y	21	21

Quarterfinals
5	(Thailand) S Taerattanachai	21	16	11
2	(Chinese Taipei) Tai T-y	17	21	21

== Men's doubles ==
=== Seeds ===
1. (South Korea) Ko Sung-hyun / Lee Yong-dae (quarter-final)
2. (South Korea) Kim Ki-jung / Kim Sa-rang (champion)
3. (South Korea) Shin Baek-cheol / Yoo Yeon-seong (semi-final)
4. (Chinese Taipei) Lee Sheng-mu / Tsai Chia-hsin (final)
5. (Malaysia) Mohd Zakry Abdul Latif / Mohd Fairuzizuan Mohd Tazari (quarter-final)
6. (Malaysia) Gan Teik Chai / Ong Soon Hock (first round)
7. (Chinese Taipei) Liao Kuan-hao / Liang Jui-wei (quarter-final)
8. (Indonesia) Yohanes Rendy Sugiarto / Muhammad Ulinnuha (second round)

=== Finals ===
Semifinals
(Indonesia) Fran Kurniawan (Indonesia) Bona Septano	20	21	9
4	(Chinese Taipei) Lee Sheng-mu (Chinese Taipei) Tsai Chia-hsin	22	13	21
3	(South Korea) Shin Baek-cheol (South Korea) Yoo Yeon-seong	17	16
2	(South Korea) Kim Ki-jung (South Korea) Kim Sa-rang	21	21

Final
4	(Chinese Taipei) Lee Sheng-mu (Chinese Taipei) Tsai Chia-hsin	11	11
2	(South Korea) Kim Ki-jung (South Korea) Kim Sa-rang	21	21

=== Top half ===
==== Section 1 ====
First Round
1	(South Korea) Ko S-h (South Korea) Lee Y-d	21	21
(Thailand) D Puavaranukroh (Thailand) K Kittinupong	17	12
(Singapore) T Hee (Singapore) T Yeo	18	19
(South Korea) Jun B-c (South Korea) Kang J-w	21	21
8	(Indonesia) Y Sugiarto (Indonesia) M Ulinnuha	21	21
(Chinese Taipei) Tien T-c (Chinese Taipei) Wang C-l	16	18
(Chinese Taipei) Liao M-c (Chinese Taipei) Yang P-h	18	11
(Indonesia) F Kurniawan (Indonesia) B Septano	21	21

Second Round
1	(South Korea) Ko S-h (South Korea) Lee Y-d	21	21
(South Korea) Jun B-c (South Korea) Kang J-w	13	19
8	(Indonesia) Y Sugiarto (Indonesia) M Ulinnuha	20	11
(Indonesia) F Kurniawan (Indonesia) B Septano	22	21

Quarterfinals
1	(South Korea) Ko S-h (South Korea) Lee Y-d	18	16
(Indonesia) F Kurniawan (Indonesia) B Septano	21	21

==== Section 2 ====
First Round
4	(Chinese Taipei) Lee S-m (Chinese Taipei) Tsai C-h	21	21
(Singapore) A Chen (Singapore) R Gonansa	6	14
(Thailand) S Prapakamol (Thailand) P Vilailak	21	21
(Chinese Taipei) Chang K-c (Chinese Taipei) Liao C-h	14	19
5	(Malaysia) Z Abdul Latif (Malaysia) F Tazari	21	21
Q2	(Chinese Taipei) Lee J-h (Chinese Taipei) Su Y-n	20	11
(Chinese Taipei) Lin C-y (Chinese Taipei) Wu H-l	21	21
(Australia) R Tam (Australia) G Warfe	16	19

Second Round
4	(Chinese Taipei) Lee S-m (Chinese Taipei) Tsai C-h	21	21
(Thailand) S Prapakamol (Thailand) P Vilailak	17	13
5	(Malaysia) Z Abdul Latif (Malaysia) F Tazari	21	21	21
(Chinese Taipei) Lin C-y (Chinese Taipei) Wu H-l	23	16	16

Quarterfinals
4	(Chinese Taipei) Lee S-m (Chinese Taipei) Tsai C-h	21	13	21
5	(Malaysia) Z Abdul Latif (Malaysia) F Tazari	15	21	13

=== Bottom half ===
==== Section 3 ====
First Round
Q4	(Macau) Lam CM (Macau) Leong KF	12	13
(Australia) R Middleton (Australia) R Smith	21	21
(Thailand) W Ampunsuwan (Thailand) P Chalardchaleam	17	21	21
6	(Malaysia) Gan TC (Malaysia) Ong SH	21	17	9
(South Korea) Kim D-e (South Korea) Lee S-j	16	19
(Chinese Taipei) Chang K-l (Chinese Taipei) Tseng M-h	21	21
(Chinese Taipei) Lin Y-j (Chinese Taipei) Wang C-h	16	8
3	(South Korea) Shin B-c (South Korea) Yoo Y-s	21	21

Second Round
(Australia) R Middleton (Australia) R Smith	21	21
(Thailand) W Ampunsuwan (Thailand) P Chalardchaleam	17	18
(Chinese Taipei) Chang K-l (Chinese Taipei) Tseng M-h	21	9	18
3	(South Korea) Shin B-c (South Korea) Yoo Y-s	19	21	21

Quarterfinals
(Australia) R Middleton (Australia) R Smith	15	14
3	(South Korea) Shin B-c (South Korea) Yoo Y-s	21	21

==== Section 4 ====
First Round
Q3	(Chinese Taipei) Chiang Y-w (Chinese Taipei) Lee Y	12	15
(Indonesia) Hardianto (Indonesia) A Putra	21	21
(South Korea) Bae K-y (South Korea) Jung J-w	7	12
7	(Chinese Taipei) Liang J-w (Chinese Taipei) Liao K-h	21	21
Q1	(Hong Kong) F Kurniawan (Hong Kong) Yeung SC	15	21	19
(Singapore) Loh KY (Singapore) D Wong	21	15	21
(Indonesia) R Alexander (Indonesia) S Geh	10	13
2	(South Korea) Kim K-j (South Korea) Kim S-r	21	21

Second Round
(Indonesia) Hardianto (Indonesia) A Putra	13	18
7	(Chinese Taipei) Liang J-w (Chinese Taipei) Liao K-h	21	21
(Singapore) Loh KY (Singapore) D Wong	13	8
2	(South Korea) Kim K-j (South Korea) Kim S-r	21	21

Quarterfinals
7	(Chinese Taipei) Liang J-w (Chinese Taipei) Liao K-h	19	21	17
2	(South Korea) Kim K-j (South Korea) Kim S-r	21	14	21

== Women's doubles ==
=== Seeds ===
1. (South Korea) Jung Kyung-eun / Kim Ha-na (champion)
2. (South Korea) Lee So-hee / Shin Seung-chan (final)
3. (South Korea) Ko A-ra / Yoo Hae-won (semi-final)
4. (Malaysia) Ng Hui Ern / Ng Hui Lin (quarter-final)
5. (Japan) Reika Kakiiwa / Miyuki Maeda (quarter-final)
6. (South Korea) Jang Ye-na / Kim So-young (quarter-final)
7. (Singapore) Shinta Mulia Sari / Yao Lei (second round)
8. (Macau) Wang Rong / Zhang Zhibo (semi-final)

=== Finals ===
Semifinals
1	(South Korea) Jung Kyung-eun (South Korea) Kim Ha-na	21	21
3	(South Korea) Ko A-ra (South Korea) Yoo Hae-won	16	17
8	(Macau) Wang Rong (Macau) Zhang Zhibo	13	21	16
2	(South Korea) Lee So-hee (South Korea) Shin Seung-chan	21	18	21

Final
1	(South Korea) Jung Kyung-eun (South Korea) Kim Ha-na
2	(South Korea) Lee So-hee (South Korea) Shin Seung-chan	wo

=== Top half ===
==== Section 1 ====
First Round
1	(South Korea) Jung K-e (South Korea) Kim H-n	21	21
(Chinese Taipei) Cheng W-h (Chinese Taipei) Hsieh P-c	11	17
(Indonesia) K Dewi (Indonesia) M Jauhari	21	21
(Chinese Taipei) Chang Y-h (Chinese Taipei) Shih Y-c	14	14
5	(Japan) R Kakiiwa (Japan) M Maeda	21	21
Q1	(Chinese Taipei) Lin T-y (Chinese Taipei) Liu S-c	16	11
(Thailand) A Serithammarak (Thailand) P Munkitamorn	5^{r}
(Chinese Taipei) Chien Y-c (Chinese Taipei) Wu T-j	16

Second Round
1	(South Korea) Jung K-e (South Korea) Kim H-n	18	21	21
(Indonesia) K Dewi (Indonesia) M Jauhari	21	15	13
5	(Japan) R Kakiiwa (Japan) M Maeda	19	21	21
(Chinese Taipei) Chien Y-c (Chinese Taipei) Wu T-j	21	11	19

Quarterfinals
1	(South Korea) Jung K-e (South Korea) Kim H-n	21	21
5	(Japan) R Kakiiwa (Japan) M Maeda	18	15

==== Section 2 ====
First Round
3	(South Korea) Ko A-r (South Korea) Yoo H-w	21	21
(Thailand) P Arkornsakul (Thailand) R Prajongjai	10	14
(Chinese Taipei) Chen H-h (Chinese Taipei) Lai C-w	21	21
Q3	(Singapore) E Chua (Singapore) D Yuliana	5	13
7	(Singapore) S Sari (Singapore) Yao L	22	21
(Indonesia) M Oktavianti (Indonesia) R Putri Sari	20	13
Q2	(Thailand) C Chaladchalam (Thailand) P Muenwong	21	21
(Chinese Taipei) Chiang K-h (Chinese Taipei) Tsai P-l	16	16

Second Round
3	(South Korea) Ko A-r (South Korea) Yoo H-w	21	21
(Chinese Taipei) Chen H-h (Chinese Taipei) Lai C-w	18	14
7	(Singapore) S Sari (Singapore) Yao L	10	20
Q2	(Thailand) C Chaladchalam (Thailand) P Muenwong	21	22

Quarterfinals
3	(South Korea) Ko A-r (South Korea) Yoo H-w	21	21	21
Q2	(Thailand) C Chaladchalam (Thailand) P Muenwong	23	9	19

=== Bottom half ===
==== Section 3 ====
First Round
(Thailand) N Saengchote (Thailand) S Suwannakitborihan	21	21
(Chinese Taipei) Hung S-c (Chinese Taipei) Wu F-c	17	18
(Indonesia) M Giovani (Indonesia) M Oklamona	15	17
8	(Macau) Wang R (Macau) Zhang ZB	21	21
Q4	(Chinese Taipei) Chen P-j (Chinese Taipei) Huang M-c	24	18	21
(Chinese Taipei) Chang C-h (Chinese Taipei) Chang H-t	22	21	16
(Singapore) Fu MT (Singapore) V Neo	15	21	16
4	(Malaysia) Ng HE (Malaysia) Ng HL	21	19	21

Second Round
(Thailand) N Saengchote (Thailand) S Suwannakitborihan	10	11
8	(Macau) Wang R (Macau) Zhang ZB	21	21
Q4	(Chinese Taipei) Chen P-j (Chinese Taipei) Huang M-c	18	17
4	(Malaysia) Ng HE (Malaysia) Ng HL	21	21

Quarterfinals
8	(Macau) Wang R (Macau) Zhang ZB	21	22	21
4	(Malaysia) Ng HE (Malaysia) Ng HL	15	24	9

==== Section 4 ====
First Round
(Thailand) P Supajirakul (Thailand) S Taerattanachai	21	16	21
(South Korea) Choi H-i (South Korea) Park S-y	14	21	9
(New Zealand) A Rankin (New Zealand) M Stapleton	1	4
6	(South Korea) Jang Y-n (South Korea) Kim S-y	21	21
(Chinese Taipei) Shuai P-l (Thailand) S Thoungthongkam	21	11	15
(Chinese Taipei) Wang P-r (Chinese Taipei) Kuo Y-w	19	21	21
(Thailand) R Chuthabunditkul (Thailand) J Kittiharakul	11	20
2	(South Korea) Lee S-h (South Korea) Shin S-c	21	22

Second Round
(Thailand) P Supajirakul (Thailand) S Taerattanachai	22	7
6	(South Korea) Jang Y-n (South Korea) Kim S-y	24	21
(Chinese Taipei) Wang P-r (Chinese Taipei) Kuo Y-w	18	21	14
2	(South Korea) Lee S-h (South Korea) Shin S-c	21	14	21

Quarterfinals
6	(South Korea) Jang Y-n (South Korea) Kim S-y	21	17	19
2	(South Korea) Lee S-h (South Korea) Shin S-c	14	21	21

== Mixed doubles ==
=== Seeds ===
1. (Indonesia) Muhammad Rijal / Debby Susanto (second round)
2. (Thailand) Sudket Prapakamol / Saralee Thoungthongkam (quarter-final)
3. (South Korea) Shin Baek-cheol / Jang Ye-na (champion)
4. (Singapore) Danny Bawa Chrisnanta / Vanessa Neo Yu Yan (second round)

=== Finals ===
Semifinals
(South Korea) Lee Yong-dae (South Korea) Shin Seung-chan	12	18
(South Korea) Yoo Yeon-seong (South Korea) Eom Hye-won	21	21
3	(South Korea) Shin Baek-cheol (South Korea) Jang Ye-na	21	21
(South Korea) Kim Ki-jung (South Korea) Kim So-young	18	18

Final
(South Korea) Yoo Yeon-seong (South Korea) Eom Hye-won	20	21	16
3	(South Korea) Shin Baek-cheol (South Korea) Jang Ye-na	22	12	21

=== Top half ===
==== Section 1 ====
First Round
1	(Indonesia) M Rijal (Indonesia) D Susanto
BYE
(Chinese Taipei) Liao M-c (Chinese Taipei) Chen H-h	21	17	15
(South Korea) Lee Y-d (South Korea) Shin S-c	19	21	21
(Singapore) T Yeo (Singapore) S Sari
BYE
(Malaysia) V Mawan (Malaysia) S Saniru	wo
(New Zealand) J Wu (Chinese Taipei) Chang Y-l

Second Round
1	(Indonesia) M Rijal (Indonesia) D Susanto	12	21	18
(South Korea) Lee Y-d (South Korea) Shin S-c	21	15	21
(Singapore) T Yeo (Singapore) S Sari	21	21
(New Zealand) J Wu (Chinese Taipei) Chang Y-l	8	9

Quarterfinals
(South Korea) Lee Y-d (South Korea) Shin S-c	18	21	21
(Singapore) T Yeo (Singapore) S Sari	21	16	15

==== Section 2 ====
First Round
4	(Singapore) D Chrisnanta (Singapore) V Neo
BYE
(South Korea) Ko S-h (South Korea) Kim H-n	21	21
(Chinese Taipei) Lee J-h (Chinese Taipei) Huang M-c	12	11
(Thailand) D Puavaranukroh (Thailand) P Supajirakul	21	21
(Chinese Taipei) Wang C-m (Chinese Taipei) Hsieh P-c	18	15
(South Korea) Yoo Y-s (South Korea) Eom H-w	21	21
(Thailand) P Chalardchaleam (Thailand) J Kittiharakul	17	12

Second Round
4	(Singapore) D Chrisnanta (Singapore) V Neo	19	11
(South Korea) Ko S-h (South Korea) Kim H-n	21	21
(Thailand) D Puavaranukroh (Thailand) P Supajirakul	11	9
(South Korea) Yoo Y-s (South Korea) Eom H-w	21	21

Quarterfinals
(South Korea) Ko S-h (South Korea) Kim H-n	15	16
(South Korea) Yoo Y-s (South Korea) Eom H-w	21	21

=== Bottom half ===
==== Section 3 ====
First Round
(Singapore) Loh KH (Singapore) D Yuliana	19	16
(Chinese Taipei) Lee S-m (Chinese Taipei) Cheng S-c	21	21
(Indonesia) A Prasetya (Indonesia) S Irawati	21	11	23
(South Korea) Kang J-w (South Korea) Choi H-i	16	21	21
(Thailand) W Ampunsuwan (Thailand) R Chuthabunditkul	21	18
(Chinese Taipei) Tseng M-h (Chinese Taipei) Lai C-w	23	21
BYE
3	(South Korea) Shin B-c (South Korea) Jang Y-n

Second Round
(Chinese Taipei) Lee S-m (Chinese Taipei) Cheng S-c	14	18
(Indonesia) A Prasetya (Indonesia) S Irawati	21	21
(Chinese Taipei) Tseng M-h (Chinese Taipei) Lai C-w	12	19
3	(South Korea) Shin B-c (South Korea) Jang Y-n	21	21

Quarterfinals
(Indonesia) A Prasetya (Indonesia) S Irawati	12	17
3	(South Korea) Shin B-c (South Korea) Jang Y-n	21	21

==== Section 4 ====
First Round
(South Korea) Kim K-j (South Korea) Kim S-y	21	19	21
(Chinese Taipei) Huang P-y (Chinese Taipei) Cheng W-h	14	21	14
(Singapore) T Hee (Singapore) Yao L	21	21
(Malaysia) R Abdul Latif (India) K Das	12	13
(Malaysia) Z Abdul Latif (Thailand) P Munkitamorn	0^{r}
(Chinese Taipei) Lin C-y (Chinese Taipei) Wang P-r	0
BYE
2	(Thailand) S Prapakamol (Thailand) S Thoungthongkam

Second Round
(South Korea) Kim K-j (South Korea) Kim S-y	21	20	21
(Singapore) T Hee (Singapore) Yao L	16	22	12
(Chinese Taipei) Lin C-y (Chinese Taipei) Wang P-r	12	17
2	(Thailand) S Prapakamol (Thailand) S Thoungthongkam	21	21

Quarterfinals
(South Korea) Kim K-j (South Korea) Kim S-y	21	22
2	(Thailand) S Prapakamol (Thailand) S Thoungthongkam	13	20

Preceded by 2013 Canada Open Grand Prix	BWF Grand Prix Gold and Grand Prix; 2013 season	Succeeded by 2013 Indonesia Open Grand Prix Gold
