= 2013 Macau Open Grand Prix Gold =

2013 Macau Grand Prix Gold
Tournament details
- Dates: November 26, 2013 - December 1, 2013
- Total prize money: US$120,000
- Venue: Macau Forum
- Location: Macau

Champions
- Men's singles: (South Korea) Son Wan-ho
- Women's singles: (India) P. V. Sindhu
- Men's doubles: (Malaysia) Hoon Thien How (Malaysia) Tan Wee Kiong
- Women's doubles: (China) Bao Yixin (China) Tang Jinhua
- Mixed doubles: (China) Lu Kai (China) Huang Yaqiong

The 2013 Macau Open Grand Prix Open was the seventieth grand prix gold and grand prix tournament of the 2013 BWF Grand Prix Gold and Grand Prix. The tournament was held in Macau Forum, Macau November 26 – December 1, 2013 and had a total purse of $120,000.

== Men's singles ==
=== Seeds ===
1. (Japan) Kenichi Tago (first round)
2. (Thailand) Tanongsak Saensomboonsuk (withdrew)
3. (Hong Kong) Hu Yun (second round)
4. (Germany) Marc Zwiebler (withdrew)
5. (Hong Kong) Wong Wing Ki (third round)
6. (India) Rajah Menuri Venkata Gurusaidutt (withdrew)
7. (Japan) Kento Momota (second round)
8. (India) Anand Pawar (withdrew)
9. (Chinese Taipei) Hsu Jen-hao (semi-finals)
10. (India) Sai Praneeth (first round)
11. (Russia) Vladimir Ivanov (quarter-finals)
12. (India) Prannoy Kumar (second round)
13. (Thailand) Suppanyu Avihingsanon (first round)
14. (Malaysia) Tan Chun Seang (third round)
15. (Hong Kong) Chan Yan Kit (second round)
16. (Russia) Vladimir Malkov (third round)

=== Finals ===
Quarterfinals
(South Korea) Son Wan-ho	21	19	21
11	(Russia) Vladimir Ivanov	16	21	16
(Chinese Taipei) Chu Han-chou	14	11
9	(Chinese Taipei) Hsu Jen-hao	21	21
(Chinese Taipei) Hsueh Hsuan-yi	22	20	21
(Hong Kong) Tam Chun Hei	20	22	17
(China) Tian Houwei	21	21
(China) Huang Yuxiang	16	13

Semifinals
(South Korea) Son Wan-ho	21	21
9	(Chinese Taipei) Hsu Jen-hao	14	19
(Chinese Taipei) Hsueh Hsuan-yi	21	21
(China) Tian Houwei	15	17

Final
(South Korea) Son Wan-ho	21	21
(Chinese Taipei) Hsueh Hsuan-yi	11	15

=== Top half ===
==== Section 1 ====
First Round
1	(Japan) K Tago	11	14
(South Korea) Son W-h	21	21
BYE
(Malaysia) Ai WJ
13	(Thailand) S Avihingsanon	14	21	11
(Malaysia) Z Zulkiffli	21	8	21
Q3	(Macau) Wan WC	w	/	o
(Hong Kong) Ng KL

Second Round
(South Korea) Son W-h	21	21
(Malaysia) Ai WJ	10	12
(Malaysia) Z Zulkiffli	21	21
Q3	(Macau) Wan WC	4	9

Third Round
(South Korea) Son W-h	21	21
(Malaysia) Z Zulkiffli	11	7

==== Section 2 ====
First Round
8	(India) A Pawar	wo
(Malaysia) I Jaafar
(Trinidad and Tobago) N Bonkowsky	6	7
(Malaysia) I Zainuddin	21	21
11	(Russia) V Ivanov	18	21	21
(Chinese Taipei) Yang C-h	21	19	4
(Chinese Taipei) Hsieh F-t	15	21	15
(Malaysia) Chiang JS	21	15	21

Second Round
(Malaysia) I Jaafar	7	6
(Malaysia) I Zainuddin	21	21
11	(Russia) V Ivanov	21	21
(Malaysia) Chiang JS	8	17

Third Round
(Malaysia) I Zainuddin	13	17
11	(Russia) V Ivanov	21	21

==== Section 3 ====
First Round
PFQ	(Chinese Taipei) Kuo P-c
(China) Xue S	wo
(Chinese Taipei) Lin C-h	21	21
Q2	(Macau) Iek UI	10	8
10	(India) S Praneeth	19	17
Q6	(South Korea) Choi S-k	21	21
(Chinese Taipei) Chu H-c	18	21	21
(South Korea) Kim M-k	21	16	11

Second Round
PFQ	(Chinese Taipei) Kuo P-c	21	19	10
(Chinese Taipei) Lin C-h	18	21	21
Q6	(South Korea) Choi S-k	15	20
(Chinese Taipei) Chu H-c	21	22

Third Round
(Chinese Taipei) Lin C-h	10	22
(Chinese Taipei) Chu H-c	21	24

==== Section 4 ====
First Round
5	(Hong Kong) Wong WK	21	21
(Japan) H Takeuchi	17	19
(Chinese Taipei) Shih K-c	21	14	21
(Singapore) A Chen	18	21	16
9	(Chinese Taipei) Hsu J-h	21	21
Q1	(Macau) Lam CM	9	6
(Macau) Lou HM	5	7
(India) S Varma	21	21

Second Round
5	(Hong Kong) Wong WK	21	21
(Chinese Taipei) Shih K-c	13	16
9	(Chinese Taipei) Hsu J-h	21	21
(India) S Varma	16	13

Third Round
5	(Hong Kong) Wong WK	21	18	20
9	(Chinese Taipei) Hsu J-h	16	21	22

=== Bottom half ===
==== Section 5 ====
First Round
(Macau) J Lo	8	7
(Malaysia) Kuan BH	21	21
(Canada) T Chiu	12	15
14	(Malaysia) Tan CS	21	21
(Malaysia) Wong KY	wo
(Chinese Taipei) Hsueh H-y
(Thailand) P Thongnuam	15	12
7	(Japan) K Momota	21	21

Second Round
(Malaysia) Kuan BH	19	18
14	(Malaysia) Tan CS	21	21
(Chinese Taipei) Hsueh H-y	21	21
7	(Japan) K Momota	18	18

Third Round
14	(Malaysia) Tan CS	12	17
(Chinese Taipei) Hsueh H-y	21	21

==== Section 6 ====
First Round
(Chinese Taipei) Hsu S-w	17	16
(Hong Kong) Tam CH	21	21
(Indonesia) A Marteen	10	23	10
12	(India) P Kumar	21	21	21
(Malaysia) Woon KH	13	16
(China) Guo K	21	21
Q7	(Canada) B Wynn-Morris	9	15
3	(Hong Kong) Hu Y	21	21

Second Round
(Hong Kong) Tam CH	21	21
12	(India) P Kumar	13	18
(China) Guo K	21	21
3	(Hong Kong) Hu Y	9	7

Third Round
(Hong Kong) Tam CH	21	12	23
(China) Guo K	16	21	21

==== Section 7 ====
First Round
(Malaysia) Loh WS	wo
Q8	(United States) S Karve
(Macau) Leong KF	10	11
16	(Russia) V Malkov	21	21
(South Korea) Park S-m	11	15
(China) Tian HW	21	21
(Hong Kong) Wei N
6	(India) R Gurusaidutt	wo

Second Round
Q8	(United States) S Karve	6	9
16	(Russia) V Malkov	21	21
(China) Tian HW	21	20	21
(Hong Kong) Wei N	14	22	15

Third Round
16	(Russia) V Malkov	13	21	14
(China) Tian HW	21	19	21

==== Section 8 ====
First Round
(China) Huang YX	19	21	21
(Chinese Taipei) Wan C-h	21	9	8
(Malaysia) H Hashim	wo
15	(Hong Kong) Chan YK
Q4	(Malaysia) B Rajes	11	11
(Thailand) K Phetpradab	21	21
(Chinese Taipei) Wang T-w	21	14	16
PFQ	(China) Liao JW	18	21	21

Second Round
(China) Huang YX	21	21
15	(Hong Kong) Chan YK	15	16
(Thailand) K Phetpradab	16	18
PFQ	(China) Liao JW	21	21

Third Round
(China) Huang YX	11	21	21
PFQ	(China) Liao JW	21	16	15

== Women's singles ==
=== Seeds ===
1. (India) P. V. Sindhu (champion)
2. (Thailand) Nitchaon Jindapol (first round)
3. (Hong Kong) Yip Pui Yin (semi-finals)
4. (Chinese Taipei) Pai Hsiao-ma (first round)
5. (Hong Kong) Chan Tsz Ka (quarter-finals)
6. (China) Deng Xuan (quarter-finals)
7. (Canada) Michelle Li (final)
8. (Chinese Taipei) Cheng Chi-ya (first round)

=== Finals ===
Semifinals
1	(India) P. V. Sindhu	21	18	21
Q3	(China) Qin Jinjing	13	21	19
3	(Hong Kong) Yip Pui Yin	15	16
7	(Canada) Michelle Li	21	21

Final
1	(India) P. V. Sindhu	21	21
7	(Canada) Michelle Li	15	12

=== Top half ===
==== Section 1 ====
First Round
1	(India) P. V. Sindhu	15	21	21
(South Korea) Kim S-j	21	12	9
(Austria) S Prutsch	9	6
(Thailand) S Ponsana	21	21
5	(Hong Kong) Chan TK	21	21
(Thailand) N Saengchote	13	16
Q4	(South Korea) Ko E-b	18	21	18
(Chinese Taipei) Hsu Y-c	21	18	21

Second Round
1	(India) P. V. Sindhu	18	21	21
(Thailand) S Ponsana	21	8	14
5	(Hong Kong) Chan TK	21	21
(Chinese Taipei) Hsu Y-c	10	10

Quarterfinals
1	(India) P. V. Sindhu	21	21
5	(Hong Kong) Chan TK	17	12

==== Section 2 ====
First Round
4	(Chinese Taipei) Pai H-m	21	18	11
Q3	(China) Qin JJ	18	21	21
(China) Hui XR	21	21
Q2	(Chinese Taipei) Lin Y-c	15	17
6	(China) Deng X	21	21
(Chinese Taipei) Pai Y-p	15	17
PFQ	(Chinese Taipei) Chen H-h	21	21
(Canada) N Grether	9	9

Second Round
Q3	(China) Qin JJ	21	21
(China) Hui XR	16	11
6	(China) Deng X	21	21
PFQ	(Chinese Taipei) Chen H-h	15	9

Quarterfinals
Q3	(China) Qin JJ	21	15	21
6	(China) Deng X	16	21	16

=== Bottom half ===
==== Section 3 ====
First Round
PFQ	(Chinese Taipei) Cheng S-c	16	19
(Thailand) P Chochuwong	21	21
(India) S Gokhale	24	21
8	(Chinese Taipei) Cheng C-y	22	15
(Canada) C Reid	15	14
Q1	(Russia) E Dimova	21	21
(Chinese Taipei) Chiang M-h	8	5
3	(Hong Kong) Yip PY	21	21

Second Round
(Thailand) P Chochuwong	21	10	21
(India) S Gokhale	19	21	15
Q1	(Russia) E Dimova	12	12
3	(Hong Kong) Yip PY	21	21

Quarterfinals
(Thailand) P Chochuwong	16	16
3	(Hong Kong) Yip PY	21	21

==== Section 4 ====
First Round
(Vietnam) Le TH	9	13
(South Korea) Kim H-m	21	21
(Hong Kong) Cheung NY	12	15
7	(Canada) M Li	21	21
(China) Suo D	21	21
(Chinese Taipei) Lee C-h	8	19
(India) P Thulasi	22	21
2	(Thailand) N Jindapol	20	19

Second Round
(South Korea) Kim H-m	21	10	18
7	(Canada) M Li	15	21	21
(China) Suo D	21	21
(India) P Thulasi	15	7

Quarterfinals
7	(Canada) M Li	22	21
(China) Suo D	20	19

== Men's doubles ==
=== Seeds ===
1. (Chinese Taipei) Lee Sheng-mu / Tsai Chia-hsin (final)
2. (Malaysia) Hoon Thien How / Tan Wee Kiong (champion)
3. (Thailand) Maneepong Jongjit / Nipitphon Puangpuapech (quarter-final)
4. (Russia) Vladimir Ivanov / Ivan Sozonov (first round)
5. (Chinese Taipei) Liang Jui-wei / Liao Kuan-hao (semi-final)
6. (Malaysia) Gan Teik Chai / Ong Soon Hock (first round)
7. (Chinese Taipei) Chen Hung-ling / Lu Chia-bin (first round)
8. (Malaysia) Lim Khim Wah / Ow Yao Han (second round)

=== Finals ===
Semifinals
1	(Chinese Taipei) Lee Sheng-mu (Chinese Taipei) Tsai Chia-hsin	15	21	21
(China) Li Junhui (China) Liu Yuchen	21	17	19
5	(Chinese Taipei) Liang Jui-wei (Chinese Taipei) Liao Kuan-hao	18	9
2	(Malaysia) Hoon Thien How (Malaysia) Tan Wee Kiong	21	21

Final
1	(Chinese Taipei) Lee Sheng-mu (Chinese Taipei) Tsai Chia-hsin	16	19
2	(Malaysia) Hoon Thien How (Malaysia) Tan Wee Kiong	21	21

=== Top half ===
==== Section 1 ====
First Round
1	(Chinese Taipei) Lee S-m (Chinese Taipei) Tsai C-h	21	21
(Indonesia) R Sukmawan (Indonesia) R Wijaya	9	9
(Malaysia) Goh VS (Malaysia) Teo KS	11	15
(China) Huang KX (China) Zheng SW	21	21
6	(Malaysia) Gan TC (Malaysia) Ong SH	11	0^{r}
(Thailand) W Ampunsuwan (Thailand) P Chalardchaleam	21	0
(Malaysia) J Singh (Malaysia) R Tan	11	7^{r}
(Chinese Taipei) Liao M-c (Chinese Taipei) Tseng M-h	21	14

Second Round
1	(Chinese Taipei) Lee S-m (Chinese Taipei) Tsai C-h	13	21	21
(China) Huang KX (China) Zheng SW	21	11	17
(Thailand) W Ampunsuwan (Thailand) P Chalardchaleam	12	21	14
(Chinese Taipei) Liao M-c (Chinese Taipei) Tseng M-h	21	17	21

Quarterfinals
1	(Chinese Taipei) Lee S-m (Chinese Taipei) Tsai C-h	21	21
(Chinese Taipei) Liao M-c (Chinese Taipei) Tseng M-h	15	13

==== Section 2 ====
First Round
4	(Russia) V Ivanov (Russia) I Sozonov	19	21	17
(China) Li JH (China) Liu YC	21	16	21
Q1	(Chinese Taipei) Chang K-l (Chinese Taipei) Su Y-n	23	21
(Chinese Taipei) Lin Y-j (Chinese Taipei) Wang C-h	21	19
8	(Malaysia) Lim KW (Malaysia) Ow YH	21	13	21
(Hong Kong) Chan YL (Hong Kong) Lee CH	15	21	15
Q3	(South Korea) Bae K-y (South Korea) Jung J-w	13	14
(Japan) S Ikeda (Indonesia) A Yulianto	21	21

Second Round
(China) Li JH (China) Liu YC	21	15	22
Q1	(Chinese Taipei) Chang K-l (Chinese Taipei) Su Y-n	19	21	20
8	(Malaysia) Lim KW (Malaysia) Ow YH	12	21	14
(Japan) S Ikeda (Indonesia) A Yulianto	21	19	21

Quarterfinals
(China) Li JH (China) Liu YC	21	19	21
(Japan) S Ikeda (Indonesia) A Yulianto	12	21	17

=== Bottom half ===
==== Section 3 ====
First Round
(Chinese Taipei) Lin C-y (Chinese Taipei) Wu H-l	21	14
(China) Li G (China) Zhang N	18	10^{r}
(Japan) Y Komatsuzaki (Japan) H Takeuchi	18	17
5	(Chinese Taipei) Liang J-w (Chinese Taipei) Liao K-h	21	21
(Russia) E Dremin (Russia) S Lunev	23	17	21
(Hong Kong) Chan TK (Hong Kong) Lo LK	21	21	16
(Chinese Taipei) Chen C-j (Chinese Taipei) Wang C-l	12	17
3	(Thailand) M Jongjit (Thailand) N Puangpuapech	21	21

Second Round
(Chinese Taipei) Lin C-y (Chinese Taipei) Wu H-l	17	21	20
5	(Chinese Taipei) Liang J-w (Chinese Taipei) Liao K-h	21	17	22
(Russia) E Dremin (Russia) S Lunev	13	13
3	(Thailand) M Jongjit (Thailand) N Puangpuapech	21	21

Quarterfinals
5	(Chinese Taipei) Liang J-w (Chinese Taipei) Liao K-h	21	6	11
3	(Thailand) M Jongjit (Thailand) N Puangpuapech	19	21	12^{r}

==== Section 4 ====
First Round
(Thailand) S Prapakamol (Thailand) P Vilailak	18	21	13
(Chinese Taipei) Lu C-y (Chinese Taipei) Tien T-c	21	17	21
(South Korea) Choi S-k (South Korea) Kang J-w	18	22	21
7	(Chinese Taipei) Chen H-l (Chinese Taipei) Lu C-b	21	20	18
Q4	(Malaysia) Chooi KM (Malaysia) Teo EY	23	22
(China) Chen ZF (China) Lu K	21	20
Q2	(Hong Kong) Chan DL (Hong Kong) Or CC	19	13
2	(Malaysia) Hoon TH (Malaysia) Tan WK	21	21

Second Round
(Chinese Taipei) Lu C-y (Chinese Taipei) Tien T-c	10	14
(South Korea) Choi S-k (South Korea) Kang J-w	21	21
Q4	(Malaysia) Chooi KM (Malaysia) Teo EY	21	18	19
2	(Malaysia) Hoon TH (Malaysia) Tan WK	14	21	21

Quarterfinals
(South Korea) Choi S-k (South Korea) Kang J-w	17	17
2	(Malaysia) Hoon TH (Malaysia) Tan WK	21	21

== Women's doubles ==
=== Seeds ===
1. (Hong Kong) Poon Lok Yan / Tse Ying Suet (second round)
2. (South Korea) Ko A-ra / Yoo Hae-won (semi-final)
3. (Malaysia) Vivian Hoo Kah Mun / Woon Khe Wei (second round)
4. (China) Bao Yixin / Tang Jinhua (champion)

=== Finals ===
Semifinals
(China) Luo Ying (China) Luo Yu	16	15
4	(China) Bao Yixin (China) Tang Jinhua	21	21
(China) Huang Yaqiong (China) Yu Xiaohan	21	21
2	(South Korea) Ko A-ra (South Korea) Yoo Hae-won	17	13

Final
4	(China) Bao Yixin (China) Tang Jinhua	21	21
(China) Huang Yaqiong (China) Yu Xiaohan	17	15

=== Top half ===
==== Section 1 ====
First Round
1	(Hong Kong) Poon LY (Hong Kong) Tse YS
BYE
(South Korea) Chae Y-j (South Korea) Kim J-w	18	19
(China) Luo Y (China) Luo Y	21	21
(Vietnam) Le TH (Vietnam) Pham NT	8	6
(Thailand) S Amitrapai (Thailand) L Narissapat	21	21
(South Korea) Choi H-i (South Korea) Park S-y	18	21	14
(Macau) Wang R (Macau) Zhang ZB	21	19	21

Second Round
1	(Hong Kong) Poon LY (Hong Kong) Tse YS	14	18
(China) Luo Y (China) Luo Y	21	21
(Thailand) S Amitrapai (Thailand) L Narissapat	22	22	21
(Macau) Wang R (Macau) Zhang ZB	24	20	11

Quarterfinals
(China) Luo Y (China) Luo Y	21	21
(Thailand) S Amitrapai (Thailand) L Narissapat	15	9

==== Section 2 ====
First Round
4	(China) Bao YX (China) Tang JH	21	21
(Thailand) C Chaladchalam (Thailand) P Munkitamorn	15	17
(Chinese Taipei) Kuo Y-w (Chinese Taipei) Wang P-r	2
(India) J Gutta (India) A Ponnappa	0^{r}
(Thailand) P Krajangjit (Thailand) A Serithammarak	15	21	18
(Hong Kong) Chan HY (Hong Kong) Yuen SY	21	17	21
(Chinese Taipei) Cheng W-h (Chinese Taipei) Hsieh P-c	21	21
(Malaysia) Lee MY (Malaysia) Lim YL	17	17

Second Round
4	(China) Bao YX (China) Tang JH	21	19	21
(Chinese Taipei) Kuo Y-w (Chinese Taipei) Wang P-r	18	21	8
(Hong Kong) Chan HY (Hong Kong) Yuen SY	21	16	30
(Chinese Taipei) Cheng W-h (Chinese Taipei) Hsieh P-c	18	21	29

Quarterfinals
4	(China) Bao YX (China) Tang JH	21	21
(Hong Kong) Chan HY (Hong Kong) Yuen SY	10	10

=== Bottom half ===
==== Section 3 ====
First Round
(Chinese Taipei) Chiang K-h (Chinese Taipei) Tsai P-l	21	21
(Macau) Iao MH (Macau) U TI	7	8
(Canada) N Grether (Canada) C Reid	21	21
(Chinese Taipei) Lee F-y (Chinese Taipei) Lin T-y	15	7
(Chinese Taipei) Chiang M-h (Chinese Taipei) Pai Y-p	9	8
(China) Huang YQ (China) Yu XH	21	21
(Thailand) P Muenwong (Thailand) K Ostermeyer	15	12
3	(Malaysia) V Hoo (Malaysia) Woon KW	21	21

Second Round
(Chinese Taipei) Chiang K-h (Chinese Taipei) Tsai P-l	21	21
(Canada) N Grether (Canada) C Reid	18	8
(China) Huang YQ (China) Yu XH	21	23
3	(Malaysia) V Hoo (Malaysia) Woon KW	12	21

Quarterfinals
(Chinese Taipei) Chiang K-h (Chinese Taipei) Tsai P-l	12	14
(China) Huang YQ (China) Yu XH	21	21

==== Section 4 ====
First Round
(Chinese Taipei) Chang Y-h (Chinese Taipei) Liu S-c	21	21
(Hong Kong) Chau HW (Hong Kong) Shek HY	14	11
(Chinese Taipei) Chen S-y (Chinese Taipei) Lin Y-c	9	6
(Thailand) J Kittiharakul (Thailand) R Prajongjai	21	21
(Chinese Taipei) Chiang Y-n (Chinese Taipei) Shuai P-l	12	15
(Thailand) P Supajirakul (Thailand) S Taerattanachai	21	21
BYE
2	(South Korea) Ko A-r (South Korea) Yoo H-w

Second Round
(Chinese Taipei) Chang Y-h (Chinese Taipei) Liu S-c	13	12
(Thailand) J Kittiharakul (Thailand) R Prajongjai	21	21
(Thailand) P Supajirakul (Thailand) S Taerattanachai	15	21	10
2	(South Korea) Ko A-r (South Korea) Yoo H-w	21	14	21

Quarterfinals
(Thailand) J Kittiharakul (Thailand) R Prajongjai	8	21	20
2	(South Korea) Ko A-r (South Korea) Yoo H-w	21	15	22

== Mixed doubles ==
=== Seeds ===
1. (Hong Kong) Lee Chun Hei / Chau Hoi Wah (quarter-final)
2. (Malaysia) Tan Aik Quan / Lai Pei Jing (second round)
3. (Hong Kong) Chan Yun Lung / Tse Ying Suet (quarter-final)
4. (Malaysia) Ong Jian Guo / Lim Yin Loo (first round)
5. (Thailand) Sudket Prapakamol / Savitree Amitrapai (second round)
6. (Thailand) Maneepong Jongjit / Sapsiree Taerattanachai (first round)
7. (India) Tarun Kona / Ashwini Ponnappa (first round)
8. (Chinese Taipei) Liao Min-chun / Chen Hsiao-huan (second round)

=== Finals ===
Semifinals
(China) Lu Kai (China) Huang Yaqiong	21	15	21
(South Korea) Kang Ji-wook (South Korea) Choi Hye-in	10	21	17
(South Korea) Choi Sol-kyu (South Korea) Chae Yoo-jung	21	21
(China) Huang Kaixiang (China) Chen Qingchen	11	8

Final
(China) Lu Kai (China) Huang Yaqiong	17	21	21
(South Korea) Choi Sol-kyu (South Korea) Chae Yoo-jung	21	18	17

=== Top half ===
==== Section 1 ====
First Round
1	(Hong Kong) Lee CH (Hong Kong) Chau HW	21	22
(Chinese Taipei) Lu C-y (Chinese Taipei) Chiang Y-e	11	20
(Russia) E Dremin (Russia) E Dimova	16	14
(China) Chen ZF (China) Luo Y	21	21
6	(Thailand) M Jongjit (Thailand) S Taerattanachai	11	16
(China) Lu K (China) Huang YQ	21	21
(China) Li JH (China) Yu XH	15	17
(Chinese Taipei) Wang C-m (Chinese Taipei) Chang Y-h	21	21

Second Round
1	(Hong Kong) Lee CH (Hong Kong) Chau HW	21	21
(China) Chen ZF (China) Luo Y	18	17
(China) Lu K (China) Huang YQ	21	21
(Chinese Taipei) Wang C-m (Chinese Taipei) Chang Y-h	15	8

Quarterfinals
1	(Hong Kong) Lee CH (Hong Kong) Chau HW	14	21	12
(China) Lu K (China) Huang YQ	21	10	21

==== Section 2 ====
First Round
4	(Malaysia) Ong JG (Malaysia) Lim YL	18	11
(Chinese Taipei) Chen H-l (Chinese Taipei) Lee C-h	21	21
Q3	(Thailand) P Vilailak (Thailand) P Muenwong	21	9	11
(South Korea) Kim D-e (South Korea) Ko A-r	19	21	21
8	(Chinese Taipei) Liao M-c (Chinese Taipei) Chen H-h	21	21
PFQ	(Chinese Taipei) Yang C-h (Chinese Taipei) Hsu Y-c	11	15
(Chinese Taipei) Wu H-l (Chinese Taipei) Kuo Y-w	14	11
(South Korea) Kang J-w (South Korea) Choi H-i	21	21

Second Round
(Chinese Taipei) Chen H-l (Chinese Taipei) Lee C-h	14	13
(South Korea) Kim D-e (South Korea) Ko A-r	21	21
8	(Chinese Taipei) Liao M-c (Chinese Taipei) Chen H-h	19	21	18
(South Korea) Kang J-w (South Korea) Choi H-i	21	18	21

Quarterfinals
(South Korea) Kim D-e (South Korea) Ko A-r	21	18	14
(South Korea) Kang J-w (South Korea) Choi H-i	18	21	21

=== Bottom half ===
==== Section 3 ====
First Round
(South Korea) Choi S-k (South Korea) Chae Y-j	21	21
(China) Liu YC (China) Luo Y	14	18
(Hong Kong) Wong WH (Hong Kong) Chan HY	16	13
5	(Thailand) S Prapakamol (Thailand) S Amitrapai	21	21
Q4	(South Korea) Jung J-w (South Korea) Kim J-w	21	16	21
(South Korea) Lee S-j (South Korea) Yoo H-w	19	21	17
(Thailand) P Chalardchaleam (Thailand) A Serithammarak	19	12
3	(Hong Kong) Chan YL (Hong Kong) Tse YS	21	21

Second Round
(South Korea) Choi S-k (South Korea) Chae Y-j	21	17	21
5	(Thailand) S Prapakamol (Thailand) S Amitrapai	13	21	10
Q4	(South Korea) Jung J-w (South Korea) Kim J-w	12	17
3	(Hong Kong) Chan YL (Hong Kong) Tse YS	21	21

Quarterfinals
(South Korea) Choi S-k (South Korea) Chae Y-j	21	23
3	(Hong Kong) Chan YL (Hong Kong) Tse YS	11	21

==== Section 4 ====
First Round
Q1	(Thailand) W Ampunsuwan (Thailand) R Prajongjai	17	16
Q2	(Hong Kong) F Kurniawan (Hong Kong) Poon LY	21	21
(Thailand) N Puangpuapech (Thailand) P Supajirakul	21	17	21
7	(India) T Kona (India) A Ponnappa	10	21	13
(Chinese Taipei) Lu C-b (Chinese Taipei) Cheng C-y	19	14
(China) Huang KX (China) Chen QC	21	21
(Chinese Taipei) Lin C-y (Chinese Taipei) Wang P-r	16	21	17
2	(Malaysia) Tan AQ (Malaysia) Lai PJ	21	12	21

Second Round
Q2	(Hong Kong) F Kurniawan (Hong Kong) Poon LY	18	15
(Thailand) N Puangpuapech (Thailand) P Supajirakul	21	21
(China) Huang KX (China) Chen QC	21	10	21
2	(Malaysia) Tan AQ (Malaysia) Lai PJ	10	21	19

Quarterfinals
(Thailand) N Puangpuapech (Thailand) P Supajirakul	17	21	19
(China) Huang KX (China) Chen QC	21	18	21

Preceded by 2013 Scottish Open Grand Prix	BWF Grand Prix Gold and Grand Prix; 2013 season	Succeeded by 2013 Vietnam Open Grand Prix
