= 2013 Vietnam Open Grand Prix =

2013 Vietnam Grand Prix
Tournament details
- Dates: December 2, 2013 - December 8, 2013
- Total prize money: US$50,000
- Venue: Phan Dinh Phung Stadium
- Location: Ho Chi Minh City, Vietnam

The 2013 Vietnam Open Grand Prix is the eighteenth and the last grand prix gold and grand prix tournament of the 2013 BWF Grand Prix Gold and Grand Prix. The tournament is held in Phan Dinh Phung Stadium, Ho Chi Minh City, Vietnam December 2–8, 2013 and has a total purse of $50,000.

== Men's singles ==
=== Seeds ===
1. (Indonesia) Alamsyah Yunus (semi-final)
2. (Malaysia) Tan Chun Seang (final)
3. (Hong Kong) Chan Yan Kit (third round)
4. (Malaysia) Zulfadli Zulkiffli (second round)
5. (Singapore) Ashton Chen Yong Zhao (third round)
6. (South Korea) Shon Wan-ho (champion)
7. (Hong Kong) Wei Nan (quarter-final)
8. (China) Xue Song (quarter-final)
9. (Indonesia) Simon Santoso (semi-final)
10. (Hong Kong) Ng Ka Long (first round)
11. (Malaysia) Loh Wei Sheng (withdrew)
12. (South Korea) Park Sung-min (first round)
13. (Chinese Taipei) Wang Tzu-wei (withdrew)
14. (Indonesia) Andre Marteen (first round)
15. (Indonesia) Evert Sukamta (first round)
16. (Chinese Taipei) Hsueh Hsuan-yi (second round)

=== Finals ===
Quarterfinals
1 | (Indonesia) Alamsyah Yunus | 21 | 21
7 | (Hong Kong) Wei Nan | 15 | 16
(Malaysia) Muhd Hafiz Hashim | 16 | 14
6 | (South Korea) Shon Wan-ho | 21 | 21
8 | (China) Xue Song | 23 | 20 | 8
9 | (Indonesia) Simon Santoso | 21 | 22 | 21
(Malaysia) Chong Yee Han | 18 | 13
2 | (Malaysia) Tan Chun Seang | 21 | 21

Semifinals
1 | (Indonesia) Alamsyah Yunus | 15 | 8
6 | (South Korea) Shon Wan-ho | 21 | 21
9 | (Indonesia) Simon Santoso | 13 | 21 | 18
2 | (Malaysia) Tan Chun Seang | 21 | 14 | 21

Final
6 | (South Korea) Shon Wan-ho | 21 | 21
2 | (Malaysia) Tan Chun Seang | 14 | 9

=== Top half ===
==== Section 1 ====
First Round
1 | (Indonesia) A Yunus | 21 | 21
(China) Zhao JP | 16 | 15
(Malaysia) Soong JV | 21 | 21
Q5 | (China) Sun FX | 18 | 15
10 | (Hong Kong) Ng KL | 0^{r}
(Indonesia) J Christie | 16
(Indonesia) I Mustofa | 21 | 21
(Malaysia) Tan KM | 15 | 16

Second Round
1 | (Indonesia) A Yunus | 21 | 21
(Malaysia) Soong JV | 12 | 18
(Indonesia) J Christie | 21 | 8 | 21
(Indonesia) I Mustofa | 19 | 21 | 15

Third Round
1 | (Indonesia) A Yunus | 19 | 24 | 21
(Indonesia) J Christie | 21 | 22 | 15

==== Section 2 ====
First Round
7 | (Hong Kong) Wei N | 21 | 21
(Thailand) Pr Thongnuam | 17 | 19
(Thailand) Pn Thongnuam | 18 | 26 | 17
(Indonesia) B Pangisthu | 21 | 24 | 21
16 | (Chinese Taipei) Hsueh H-y | 21 | 21
(Indonesia) F Hadmadi | 15 | 17
(Singapore) R Gonansa | 20 | 18
(South Korea) Kim M-k | 22 | 21

Second Round
7 | (Hong Kong) Wei N | 21 | 21
(Indonesia) B Pangisthu | 18 | 18
16 | (Chinese Taipei) Hsueh H-y | 19 | 21 | 21
(South Korea) Kim M-k | 21 | 16 | 23

Third Round
7 | (Hong Kong) Wei N | 21 | 21
(South Korea) Kim M-k | 17 | 16

==== Section 3 ====
First Round
4 | (Malaysia) Zf Zulkiffli | 21 | 21
Q3 | (South Korea) Choi S-k | 19 | 11
PFQ | (Thailand) P Boonpan | 9 | 14
Q4 | (China) Lin GP | 21 | 21
PFQ | (Chinese Taipei) Hsieh F-t | 21 | 24 | 21
(Thailand) B Thumpanichwong | 23 | 22 | 14
(Malaysia) H Hashim | 21 | 21
(Bahrain) J Al-Sayed | 10 | 9

Second Round
4 | (Malaysia) Zf Zulkiffli | 16 | 17
Q4 | (China) Lin GP | 21 | 21
PFQ | (Chinese Taipei) Hsieh F-t | 14 | 14
(Malaysia) H Hashim | 21 | 21

Third Round
Q4 | (China) Lin GP | 17 | 9
(Malaysia) H Hashim | 21 | 21

==== Section 4 ====
First Round
6 | (South Korea) Shon W-h | 21 | 21
(Vietnam) Nguyen HN | 13 | 12
Q8 | (China) Ye BH | 21 | 16 | 9
Q2 | (Vietnam) Nguyen DTK | 12 | 21 | 21
15 | (Indonesia) E Sukamta | 16 | 21 | 13
(Chinese Taipei) Shih K-c | 21 | 15 | 21
Q7 | (China) Shi YQ | 21 | 21
(Malaysia) Chiang JS | 17 | 18

Second Round
6 | (South Korea) Shon W-h | 21 | 21
Q2 | (Vietnam) Nguyen DTK | 11 | 12
(Chinese Taipei) Shih K-c | 18 | 21 | 21
Q7 | (China) Shi YQ | 21 | 16 | 13

Third Round
6 | (South Korea) Shon W-h | 21 | 21
(Chinese Taipei) Shih K-c | 15 | 17

=== Bottom half ===
==== Section 5 ====
First Round
(Hong Kong) Tam CH | 21 | 21
(Malaysia) Zh Zulkiffli | 10 | 10
(Malaysia) Loke KP | 21 | 21
12 | (South Korea) Park S-m | 19 | 17
(Chinese Taipei) Lin C-h | 21 | 21
Q1 | (Vietnam) Ly VH | 12 | 11
(Malaysia) Soo TZ | 9 | 20
8 | (China) Xue S | 21 | 22

Second Round
(Hong Kong) Tam CH | 21 | 21
(Malaysia) Loke KP | 14 | 12
(Chinese Taipei) Lin C-h | 17 | 8
8 | (China) Xue S | 21 | 21

Third Round
(Hong Kong) Tam CH | 8 | 7
8 | (China) Xue S | 21 | 21

==== Section 6 ====
First Round
(Bahrain) H Setiawan | 14 | 16
(Malaysia) Kuan BH | 21 | 21
(Singapore) Huang C | 14 | 16
9 | (Indonesia) S Santoso | 21 | 21
(Vietnam) Pham CC | 12 | 22 | 21
(Chinese Taipei) Lu C-h | 21 | 20 | 17
(Malaysia) Goh GC | 21 | 16
3 | (Hong Kong) Chan YK | 23 | 21

Second Round
(Malaysia) Kuan BH | 13 | 13
9 | (Indonesia) S Santoso | 21 | 21
(Vietnam) Pham CC | 17 | 6
3 | (Hong Kong) Chan YK | 21 | 21

Third Round
9 | (Indonesia) S Santoso | 21 | 21
3 | (Hong Kong) Chan YK | 9 | 11

==== Section 7 ====
First Round
(Indonesia) Siswanto | 11 | 19
(Malaysia) Chong YH | 21 | 21
Q6 | (Portugal) D Souza | wo
13 | (Chinese Taipei) Wang T-w | wo
(Thailand) K Phetpradab | 20 | 18
(Malaysia) N Ayub | 22 | 21
(Chinese Taipei) Yang S-j | 22 | 12 | 22
5 | (Singapore) A Chen | 20 | 21 | 24

Second Round
(Malaysia) Chong YH
BYE
(Malaysia) N Ayub | 21 | 19 | 8
5 | (Singapore) A Chen | 16 | 21 | 21

Third Round
(Malaysia) Chong YH | 21 | 16 | 21
5 | (Singapore) A Chen | 15 | 21 | 13

==== Section 8 ====
First Round
(Malaysia) Woon KH | 12 | 4^{r}
(Chinese Taipei) Hsu S-w | 21 | 7
(Chinese Taipei) Chu H-c | 24 | 21
14 | (Indonesia) A Marteen | 22 | 8
(Canada) T Chiu | 11 | 18
PFQ | (Thailand) C Tochareonbodee | 21 | 21
(Chinese Taipei) Yang C-h | 15 | 21 | 15
2 | (Malaysia) Tan CS | 21 | 10 | 21

Second Round
(Chinese Taipei) Hsu S-w | 21 | 21
(Chinese Taipei) Chu H-c | 18 | 19
PFQ | (Thailand) C Tochareonbodee | 8 | 11
2 | (Malaysia) Tan CS | 21 | 21

Third Round
(Chinese Taipei) Hsu S-w | 21 | 8 | 17
2 | (Malaysia) Tan CS | 11 | 21 | 21

== Women's singles ==
=== Seeds ===
1. (Indonesia) Febby Angguni (first round)
2. (Indonesia) Hera Desi (final)
3. (Indonesia) Maria Febe Kusumastuti (semi-final)
4. (Indonesia) Milicent Wiranto (first round)
5. (Thailand) Salakjit Ponsana (first round)
6. (Thailand) Pornpawee Chochuwong (quarter-final)
7. (Chinese Taipei) Hsu Ya-ching (quarter-final)
8. (South Korea) Kim Hyo-min (first round)

=== Finals ===
Semifinals
Q4 | (China) He Bingjiao | 10 | 21 | 21
Q2 | (South Korea) Ko Eun-byul | 21 | 12 | 14
3 | (Indonesia) Maria Febe Kusumastuti | 5 | 21 | 16
2 | (Indonesia) Hera Desi | 21 | 16 | 21

Final
Q4 | (China) He Bingjiao | 21 | 21
2 | (Indonesia) Hera Desi | 10 | 6

=== Top half ===
==== Section 1 ====
First Round
1 | (Indonesia) F Angguni | 19 | 21 | 6
(Chinese Taipei) Pai Y-p | 21 | 19 | 21
(Indonesia) M Nadhir | 8 | 17
Q4 | (China) He BJ | 21 | 21
8 | (South Korea) Kim H-m | 19 | 21 | 17
(Chinese Taipei) Chen H-h | 21 | 8 | 21
(Chinese Taipei) Hung S-h | 21 | 21
(Vietnam) Vu TT | 18 | 9

Second Round
(Chinese Taipei) Pai Y-p | 8 | 10
Q4 | (China) He BJ | 21 | 21
(Chinese Taipei) Chen H-h | 23 | 14 | 15
(Chinese Taipei) Hung S-h | 21 | 21 | 21

Quarterfinals
Q4 | (China) He BJ | 22 | 21
(Chinese Taipei) Hung S-h | 20 | 13

==== Section 2 ====
First Round
4 | (Indonesia) M Wiranto | 21 | 15 | 19
(Chinese Taipei) Chiang M-h | 17 | 21 | 21
(Indonesia) D Ayustine | 21 | 13 | 21
(Thailand) T Poopradubsil | 17 | 21 | 15
5 | (Thailand) S Ponsana | 15 | 0^{r}
(Malaysia) Lim YF | 21 | 0
Q2 | (South Korea) Ko E-b | 21 | 21
(Indonesia) L Josephine | 6 | 10

Second Round
(Chinese Taipei) Chiang M-h | 21 | 21
(Indonesia) D Ayustine | 14 | 17
(Malaysia) Lim YF | 12 | 15
Q2 | (South Korea) Ko E-b | 21 | 21

Quarterfinals
(Chinese Taipei) Chiang M-h | 7 | 18
Q2 | (South Korea) Ko E-b | 21 | 21

=== Bottom half ===
==== Section 3 ====
First Round
(Hong Kong) Cheung NY | 14 | 21 | 13
(Russia) E Dimova | 21 | 18 | 21
(Chinese Taipei) Tang W-y | 15 | 6
6 | (Thailand) P Chochuwong | 21 | 21
(Chinese Taipei) Cheng S-c | 21 | 20 | 21
(South Korea) Kim S-j | 19 | 22 | 14
Q3 | (China) Fan MY | 18 | 16
3 | (Indonesia) M Kusumastuti | 21 | 21

Second Round
(Russia) E Dimova | 4 | 8
6 | (Thailand) P Chochuwong | 21 | 21
(Chinese Taipei) Cheng S-c | 10 | 18
3 | (Indonesia) M Kusumastuti | 21 | 21

Quarterfinals
6 | (Thailand) P Chochuwong | 16 | 15
3 | (Indonesia) M Kusumastuti | 21 | 21

==== Section 4 ====
First Round
(Vietnam) Le TH | 18 | 21 | 21
(Chinese Taipei) Lin Y-c | 21 | 16 | 16
(Thailand) N Saengchote | 17 | 15
7 | (Chinese Taipei) Hsu Y-c | 21 | 21
(Indonesia) A Rovita | 14 | 19
Q1 | (China) Qin JJ | 21 | 21
(Malaysia) Lim CS | 12 | 12
2 | (Indonesia) H Desi | 21 | 21

Second Round
(Vietnam) Le TH | 21 | 15 | 17
7 | (Chinese Taipei) Hsu Y-c | 18 | 21 | 21
Q1 | (China) Qin JJ | 17 | 13
2 | (Indonesia) H Desi | 21 | 21

Quarterfinals
7 | (Chinese Taipei) Hsu Y-c | 19 | 6
2 | (Indonesia) H Desi | 21 | 21

== Men's doubles ==
=== Seeds ===
1. (Indonesia) Hendra Aprida Gunawan / Yonathan Suryatama (withdrew)
2. (Malaysia) Gan Teik Chai / Ong Soon Hock (withdrew)
3. (Russia) Evgenij Dremin / Sergey Lunev (second round)
4. (Indonesia) Hardianto / Agripinna Prima Rahmanto Putra (withdrew)
5. (Indonesia) Fran Kurniawan / Bona Septano (champion)
6. (Indonesia) Selvanus Geh / Alfian Eko Prasetya (withdrew)
7. (Indonesia) Hafiz Faisal / Putra Eka Rhoma (withdrew)
8. (Thailand) Ketlen Kittinupong / Dechapol Puavaranukroh (second round)

=== Finals ===
Semifinals
5 | (Indonesia) Fran Kurniawan (Indonesia) Bona Septano | 15 | 21 | 21
Q1 | (South Korea) Kim Dae-eun (South Korea) Lee Sang-joon | 21 | 13 | 12
Q3 | (Chinese Taipei) Chang Kai-liang (Chinese Taipei) Su Yi-neng | 15 | 21 | 18
(Chinese Taipei) Lin Chia-yu (Chinese Taipei) Wu Hsiao-lin | 21 | 13 | 21

Final
5 | (Indonesia) Fran Kurniawan (Indonesia) Bona Septano | 18 | 21 | 21
(Chinese Taipei) Lin Chia-yu (Chinese Taipei) Wu Hsiao-lin | 21 | 18 | 18

=== Top half ===
==== Section 1 ====
First Round
1 | (Indonesia) H Gunawan (Indonesia) Y Suryatama | wo
Q4 | (Chinese Taipei) Lin C-h (Chinese Taipei) Hsieh F-t
(Thailand) K Cholprasertsuk (Thailand) S Tovannakasem | 15 | 21 | 21
(Malaysia) N Heg (Malaysia) Tan WG | 21 | 13 | 19
5 | (Indonesia) F Kurniawan (Indonesia) B Septano | 10 | 21 | 21
(Chinese Taipei) Liao M-c (Chinese Taipei) Tseng M-h | 21 | 19 | 19
(Thailand) W Uttamang (Thailand) T Viriyangkura | 18 | 22 | 17
(Malaysia) Tan YJ (Malaysia) Yew HK | 21 | 20 | 21

Second Round
Q4 | (Chinese Taipei) Lin C-h (Chinese Taipei) Hsieh F-t | 19 | 21 | 13
(Thailand) K Cholprasertsuk (Thailand) S Tovannakasem | 21 | 17 | 21
5 | (Indonesia) F Kurniawan (Indonesia) B Septano | 21 | 21
(Malaysia) Tan YJ (Malaysia) Yew HK | 10 | 14

Quarterfinals
(Thailand) K Cholprasertsuk (Thailand) S Tovannakasem | 13 | 14
5 | (Indonesia) F Kurniawan (Indonesia) B Septano | 21 | 21

==== Section 2 ====
First Round
3 | (Russia) E Dremin (Russia) S Lunev | 21 | 21
PFQ | (Vietnam) Dinh XB (Vietnam) Kim T | 9 | 12
(South Korea) Choi S-k (South Korea) Kang J-w | 21 | 21
(Bahrain) J Al-Sayed (Bahrain) H Setiawan | 12 | 8
8 | (Thailand) K Kittinupong (Thailand) D Puavaranukroh | 12 | 21 | 21
(Indonesia) A Saputra (Indonesia) Siswanto | 21 | 10 | 16
(Chinese Taipei) Liu W-c (Chinese Taipei) Yang P-h | 14 | 19
Q1 | (South Korea) Kim D-e (South Korea) Lee S-j | 21 | 21

Second Round
3 | (Russia) E Dremin (Russia) S Lunev | 16 | 18
(South Korea) Choi S-k (South Korea) Kang J-w | 21 | 21
8 | (Thailand) K Kittinupong (Thailand) D Puavaranukroh | 20 | 24 | 19
Q1 | (South Korea) Kim D-e (South Korea) Lee S-j | 22 | 22 | 21

Quarterfinals
(South Korea) Choi S-k (South Korea) Kang J-w | 9 | 14
Q1 | (South Korea) Kim D-e (South Korea) Lee S-j | 21 | 21

=== Bottom half ===
==== Section 3 ====
First Round
(Chinese Taipei) Huang C-e (Chinese Taipei) Wang C-m | 20 | 13
(South Korea) Bae K-y (South Korea) Jung J-w | 22 | 21
(Thailand) W Buranakuea (Thailand) V Nilyoke | 21 | 21
PFQ | (Vietnam) Nguyen VC (Vietnam) Ly VH | 10 | 4
(Singapore) A Chen (Singapore) R Gonansa | 21 | 13 | 21
(Thailand) T Isriyanate (Thailand) C Tochareonbodee | 14 | 21 | 14
Q3 | (Chinese Taipei) Chang K-l (Chinese Taipei) Su Y-n | 21 | 21
PFQ | (Hong Kong) Ho WL (Hong Kong) Law CH | 11 | 18

Second Round
(South Korea) Bae K-y (South Korea) Jung J-w | 16 | 21 | 21
(Thailand) W Buranakuea (Thailand) V Nilyoke | 21 | 11 | 16
(Singapore) A Chen (Singapore) R Gonansa | 21 | 13 | 14
Q3 | (Chinese Taipei) Chang K-l (Chinese Taipei) Su Y-n | 19 | 21 | 21

Quarterfinals
(South Korea) Bae K-y (South Korea) Jung J-w | 9 | 15
Q3 | (Chinese Taipei) Chang K-l (Chinese Taipei) Su Y-n | 21 | 21

==== Section 4 ====
First Round
(South Korea) Jun B-c (South Korea) Kim D-s | 18 | 21 | 8
Q2 | (Malaysia) Chooi KM (Malaysia) Teo EY | 21 | 19 | 21
(Vietnam) Duong BD (Vietnam) Nguyen HN | 21 | 21
PFQ | (Hong Kong) Chan DL (Hong Kong) Or CC | 11 | 14
(Chinese Taipei) Lin C-y (Chinese Taipei) Wu H-l | 21 | 21
(Malaysia) Low JS (Malaysia) Tai AK | 17 | 16
(Thailand) T Boonrawd (Thailand) P Vilailak
2 | (Malaysia) Gan TC (Malaysia) Ong SH | wo

Second Round
Q2 | (Malaysia) Chooi KM (Malaysia) Teo EY | 21 | 21
(Vietnam) Duong BD (Vietnam) Nguyen HN | 15 | 19
(Chinese Taipei) Lin C-y (Chinese Taipei) Wu H-l | 21 | 21
(Thailand) T Boonrawd (Thailand) P Vilailak | 15 | 16

Quarterfinals
Q2 | (Malaysia) Chooi KM (Malaysia) Teo EY | 21 | 20 | 18
(Chinese Taipei) Lin C-y (Chinese Taipei) Wu H-l | 18 | 22 | 21

== Women's doubles ==
=== Seeds ===
1. (South Korea) Ko A-ra / Yoo Hae-won (champion)
2. (Malaysia) Amelia Alicia Anscelly / Soong Fie Cho (final)
3. (Chinese Taipei) Chen Hsiao-huan / Lai Chia-wen (semi-final)
4. (Chinese Taipei) Chiang Kai-hsin / Tsai Pei-ling (first round)

=== Finals ===
Semifinals
1 | (South Korea) Ko A-ra (South Korea) Yoo Hae-won | 21 | 21
3 | (Chinese Taipei) Chen Hsiao-huan (Chinese Taipei) Lai Chia-wen | 18 | 13
(South Korea) Choi Hye-in (South Korea) Park So-young | 18 | 14
2 | (Malaysia) Amelia Alicia Anscelly (Malaysia) Soong Fie Cho | 21 | 21

Final
1 | (South Korea) Ko A-ra (South Korea) Yoo Hae-won | 12 | 21 | 21
2 | (Malaysia) Amelia Alicia Anscelly (Malaysia) Soong Fie Cho | 21 | 10 | 9

=== Top half ===
==== Section 1 ====
First Round
1 | (South Korea) Ko A-r (South Korea) Yoo H-w
BYE
(Chinese Taipei) Chen S (Chinese Taipei) Lin Y-c | 18 | 10
(Thailand) P Muenwong (Thailand) K Ostermeyer | 21 | 21
(Chinese Taipei) Lee F-y (Chinese Taipei) Lin T-y | 21 | 21
(Vietnam) Nguyen TAD (Vietnam) Nguyen TBT | 19 | 16
(Vietnam) Nguyen TH (Vietnam) Nguyen TKL | 9 | 5
(Thailand) J Kittiharakul (Thailand) R Prajongjai | 21 | 21

Second Round
1 | (South Korea) Ko A-r (South Korea) Yoo H-w | 21 | 21
(Thailand) P Muenwong (Thailand) K Ostermeyer | 13 | 12
(Chinese Taipei) Lee F-y (Chinese Taipei) Lin T-y | 13 | 13
(Thailand) J Kittiharakul (Thailand) R Prajongjai | 21 | 21

Quarterfinals
1 | (South Korea) Ko A-r (South Korea) Yoo H-w | 21 | 21
(Thailand) J Kittiharakul (Thailand) R Prajongjai | 17 | 13

==== Section 2 ====
First Round
3 | (Chinese Taipei) Chen H-h (Chinese Taipei) Lai C-w | 21 | 21
(Vietnam) Tran QA (Vietnam) Vu BN | 8 | 8
(Vietnam) Nguyen TS (Vietnam) Vu TT | 23 | 14 | 21
(Thailand) P Krajangjit (Thailand) A Serithammarak | 21 | 21 | 17
(Indonesia) K Dewi (Indonesia) M Jauhari | 21 | 25
(Malaysia) Chow MK (Malaysia) Lai SJ | 14 | 23
(Chinese Taipei) Chiang M-h (Chinese Taipei) Pai Y-p | 13 | 18
(Thailand) P Arkornsakul (Thailand) R Chuthabunditkul | 21 | 21

Second Round
3 | (Chinese Taipei) Chen H-h (Chinese Taipei) Lai C-w | 21 | 17 | 21
(Vietnam) Nguyen TS (Vietnam) Vu TT | 16 | 21 | 16
(Indonesia) K Dewi (Indonesia) M Jauhari | 21 | 21 | 21
(Thailand) P Arkornsakul (Thailand) R Chuthabunditkul | 14 | 23 | 12

Quarterfinals
3 | (Chinese Taipei) Chen H-h (Chinese Taipei) Lai C-w | 16 | 21 | 27
(Indonesia) K Dewi (Indonesia) M Jauhari | 21 | 15 | 25

=== Bottom half ===
==== Section 3 ====
First Round
(Hong Kong) Chan HY (Hong Kong) Yuen SY | 21 | 19 | 24
(Chinese Taipei) Kuo Y-w (Chinese Taipei) Wang P-r | 17 | 21 | 22
(Vietnam) Le TH (Vietnam) Pham NT | 8 | 3
(South Korea) Chae Y-j (South Korea) Kim J-w | 21 | 21
(Chinese Taipei) Hung S-h (Chinese Taipei) Wu F-c | 16 | 21 | 21
(Thailand) C Julrattanamanee (Thailand) N Saengchote | 21 | 13 | 9
(South Korea) Choi H-i (South Korea) Park S-y | 18 | 21 | 21
4 | (Chinese Taipei) Chiang K-h (Chinese Taipei) Tsai P-l | 21 | 9 | 15

Second Round
(Hong Kong) Chan HY (Hong Kong) Yuen SY | 14 | 9
(South Korea) Chae Y-j (South Korea) Kim J-w | 21 | 21
(Chinese Taipei) Hung S-h (Chinese Taipei) Wu F-c | 13 | 14
(South Korea) Choi H-i (South Korea) Park S-y | 21 | 21

Quarterfinals
(South Korea) Chae Y-j (South Korea) Kim J-w | 18 | 13
(South Korea) Choi H-i (South Korea) Park S-y | 21 | 21

==== Section 4 ====
First Round
(Chinese Taipei) Wen H-y (Chinese Taipei) Ye J-y | 17 | 11
(Thailand) C Chaladchalam (Thailand) P Munkitamorn | 21 | 21
(Indonesia) A Awanda (Indonesia) D Haris | wo
(Chinese Taipei) Chang Y-h (Chinese Taipei) Liu S-c
(Vietnam) Le TTT (Vietnam) Thai THG | 15 | 16
(Thailand) P Chochuwong (Thailand) C Teachavorasinskun | 21 | 21
BYE
2 | (Malaysia) A Anscelly (Malaysia) Soong FC

Second Round
(Thailand) C Chaladchalam (Thailand) P Munkitamorn | 21 | 21
(Chinese Taipei) Chang Y-h (Chinese Taipei) Liu S-c | 6 | 10
(Thailand) P Chochuwong (Thailand) C Teachavorasinskun | 11 | 9
2 | (Malaysia) A Anscelly (Malaysia) Soong FC | 21 | 21

Quarterfinals
(Thailand) C Chaladchalam (Thailand) P Munkitamorn | 17 | 23 | 15
2 | (Malaysia) A Anscelly (Malaysia) Soong FC | 21 | 21 | 21

== Mixed doubles ==
=== Seeds ===
1. (Indonesia) Lukhi Apri Nugroho / Annisa Saufika (withdrew)
2. (Indonesia) Edi Subaktiar / Gloria Emanuelle Widjaja (withdrew)
3. (Chinese Taipei) Liao Min-chun / Chen Hsiao-huan (final)
4. (Chinese Taipei) Lin Chia-yu / Wang Pei-rong (quarter-final)
5. (South Korea) Kim Dae-eun / Ko A-ra (second round)
6. (South Korea) Kang Ji-wook / Choi Hye-in (semi-final)
7. (Indonesia) Alfian Eko Prasetya / Shendy Puspa Irawati (withdrew)
8. (Malaysia) Wong Fai Yin / Chow Mei Kuan (semi-final)

=== Finals ===
Semifinals
8 | (Malaysia) Wong Fai Yin (Malaysia) Chow Mei Kuan | 7 | 21 | 18
3 | (Chinese Taipei) Liao Min-chun (Chinese Taipei) Chen Hsiao-huan | 21 | 19 | 21
(South Korea) Choi Sol-kyu (South Korea) Chae Yoo-jung | 21 | 21
6 | (South Korea) Kang Ji-wook (South Korea) Choi Hye-in | 13 | 18

Final
3 | (Chinese Taipei) Liao Min-chun (Chinese Taipei) Chen Hsiao-huan | 20 | 21 | 14
(South Korea) Choi Sol-kyu (South Korea) Chae Yoo-jung | 22 | 19 | 21

=== Top half ===
==== Section 1 ====
First Round
PFQ | (South Korea) Jung J-w (South Korea) Kim J-w | 21 | 18 | 16
(Chinese Taipei) Wu H-l (Chinese Taipei) Kuo Y-w | 15 | 21 | 21
(Thailand) T Boonrawd (Thailand) N Saengchote | 17 | 15
(Chinese Taipei) Yang C-h (Chinese Taipei) Hsu Y-c | 21 | 21
8 | (Malaysia) Wong FY (Malaysia) Chow MK | 21 | 21
(Hong Kong) Law CH (Hong Kong) Chan HY | 11 | 15
(Chinese Taipei) Chu H-c (Chinese Taipei) Lin T-y | 11 | 21 | 20
(Malaysia) Tan CT (Malaysia) Lai SJ | 21 | 17 | 22

Second Round
(Chinese Taipei) Wu H-l (Chinese Taipei) Kuo Y-w | 21 | 21
(Chinese Taipei) Yang C-h (Chinese Taipei) Hsu Y-c | 13 | 13
8 | (Malaysia) Wong FY (Malaysia) Chow MK | 21 | 14 | 21
(Malaysia) Tan CT (Malaysia) Lai SJ | 17 | 21 | 17

Quarterfinals
(Chinese Taipei) Wu H-l (Chinese Taipei) Kuo Y-w | 13 | 13
8 | (Malaysia) Wong FY (Malaysia) Chow MK | 21 | 21

==== Section 2 ====
First Round
3 | (Chinese Taipei) Liao M-c (Chinese Taipei) Chen H-h | 21 | 21
PFQ | (South Korea) Bae K-y (South Korea) Park S-y | 11 | 11
Q3 | (Thailand) P Vilailak (Thailand) P Muenwong | 19 | 14
(Thailand) V Nilyoke (Thailand) C Chaladchalam | 21 | 21
5 | (South Korea) Kim D-e (South Korea) Ko A-r | 21 | 21
Q4 | (Thailand) T Isriyanate (Thailand) S Ponsana | 6 | 16
(Russia) E Dremin (Russia) E Dimova | 16 | 21 | 21
(Thailand) W Uttamang (Thailand) J Kittiharakul | 21 | 16 | 17

Second Round
3 | (Chinese Taipei) Liao M-c (Chinese Taipei) Chen H-h | 21 | 20 | 21
(Thailand) V Nilyoke (Thailand) C Chaladchalam | 18 | 22 | 17
5 | (South Korea) Kim D-e (South Korea) Ko A-r | 15 | 10
(Russia) E Dremin (Russia) E Dimova | 21 | 21

Quarterfinals
3 | (Chinese Taipei) Liao M-c (Chinese Taipei) Chen H-h | 15
(Russia) E Dremin (Russia) E Dimova | 18^{r}

=== Bottom half ===
==== Section 3 ====
First Round
(Thailand) W Buranakuea (Thailand) P Munkitamorn | 21 | 22 | 19
(Chinese Taipei) Huang C-e (Chinese Taipei) Lee F-y | 12 | 24 | 21
(South Korea) Choi S-k (South Korea) Chae Y-j | 21 | 21
PFQ | (Vietnam) Pham CT (Vietnam) Ton NKT | 6 | 9
(South Korea) Lee S-j (South Korea) Yoo H-w | 21 | 21
Q1 | (Vietnam) Dao MT (Vietnam) Pham NT | 6 | 19
(Malaysia) L Abdul Khalid (Malaysia) A Anscelly | 15 | 20
4 | (Chinese Taipei) Lin C-y (Chinese Taipei) Wang P-r | 21 | 22

Second Round
(Chinese Taipei) Huang C-e (Chinese Taipei) Lee F-y | 17 | 13
(South Korea) Choi S-k (South Korea) Chae Y-j | 21 | 21
(South Korea) Lee S-j (South Korea) Yoo H-w | 17 | 21 | 16
4 | (Chinese Taipei) Lin C-y (Chinese Taipei) Wang P-r | 21 | 10 | 21

Quarterfinals
(South Korea) Choi S-k (South Korea) Chae Y-j | 21 | 21
4 | (Chinese Taipei) Lin C-y (Chinese Taipei) Wang P-r | 10 | 15

==== Section 4 ====
First Round
(Chinese Taipei) Yang P-h (Chinese Taipei) Wen H-y | 21 | 18 | 21
Q2 | (Thailand) T Viriyangkura (Thailand) P Chochuwong | 16 | 21 | 18
(Chinese Taipei) Su Y-n (Chinese Taipei) Ye J-y | 11 | 12
6 | (South Korea) Kang J-w (South Korea) Choi H-y | 21 | 21
(Hong Kong) Ho WL (Hong Kong) Yuen SY | 21 | 21
(Chinese Taipei) Wang C-m (Chinese Taipei) Chang Y-h | 17 | 16
(Chinese Taipei) Tseng M-h (Chinese Taipei) Lai C-w | 21 | 21
PFQ | (Vietnam) Pham NT (Vietnam) Nguyen TBT | 14 | 6

Second Round
(Chinese Taipei) Yang P-h (Chinese Taipei) Wen H-y | 7 | 9
6 | (South Korea) Kang J-w (South Korea) Choi H-i | 21 | 21
(Hong Kong) Ho WL (Hong Kong) Yuen SY | 13 | 18
(Chinese Taipei) Tseng M-h (Chinese Taipei) Lai C-w | 21 | 21

Quarterfinals
6 | (South Korea) Kang J-w (South Korea) Choi H-i | 21 | 11 | 21
(Chinese Taipei) Tseng M-h (Chinese Taipei) Lai C-w | 16 | 21 | 13

| Preceded by 2013 Macau Open Grand Prix Gold | BWF Grand Prix Gold and Grand Prix; 2013 season | Succeeded by 2014 India Open Grand Prix Gold |
