= Dinar Dyah Ayustine =

Indonesian badminton player

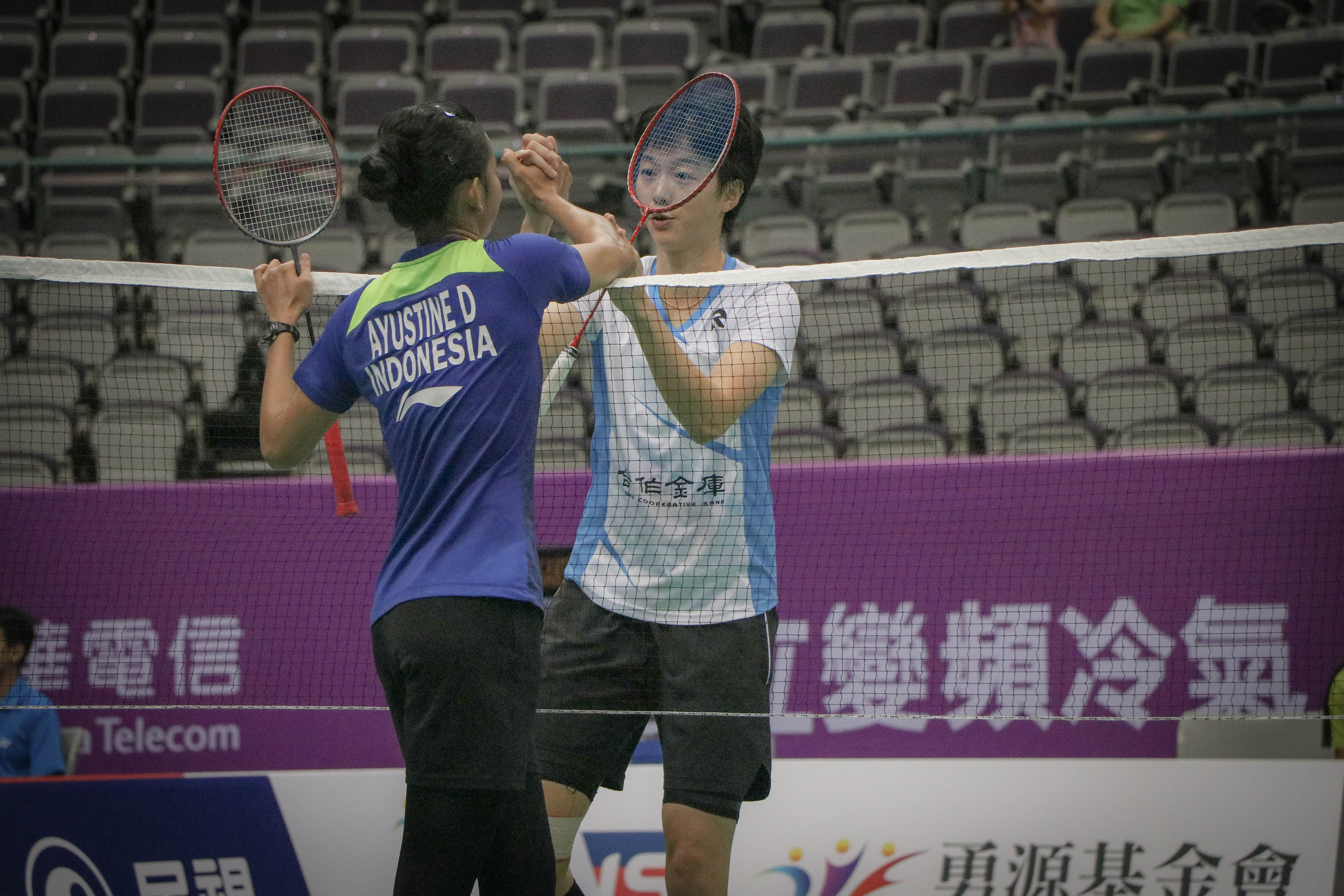

Personal information
- Born: 18 October 1993 (age 33) Karanganyar, Central Java, Indonesia
- Height: 1.65 m (5 ft 5 in)

Sport
- Country: Indonesia
- Sport: Badminton
- Handedness: Right

Women's singles
- Highest ranking: 31 (30 March 2017)
- BWF profile
Medal record
Women's badminton
Representing Indonesia
SEA Games
Bronze medal – third place	2015 Singapore	Women's team
Bronze medal – third place	2017 Kuala Lumpur	Women's team

Dinar Dyah Ayustine (born 18 October 1993) is an Indonesian badminton player, who plays in the women's singles discipline. She is from PB Djarum Kudus, a badminton club from Kudus of Central Java and joined to the club since 2004.

== Achievements ==
=== BWF International Challenge/Series ===
Women's singles
Year	Tournament	Opponent	Score	Result
2013	Indonesia International	(Bulgaria) Stefani Stoeva	13–21, 21–15, 21–12	(gold) Winner
2014	Swiss International	(Indonesia) Hanna Ramadini	9–11, 5–11, 11–7, 11–9, 6–11	(silver) Runner-up
2015	Malaysia International	(Singapore) Liang Xiaoyu	11–21, 13–21	(silver) Runner-up
2016	Smiling Fish International	(Indonesia) Ruselli Hartawan	21–10, 21–14	(gold) Winner
2018	Vietnam International	(Japan) Asuka Takahashi	13–21, 21–16, 21–14	(gold) Winner

BWF International Challenge tournament
BWF Future Series tournament

== Performance timeline ==
=== National team ===
- Senior level

Team events	2015	2016	2017
SEA Games	Bronze	—N/a	Bronze
Asian Games	—N/a		
Uber Cup	—N/a	A	—N/a
Sudirman Cup	A	—N/a	A

=== Individual competitions ===
- Senior level

Event	2017	2018
Asia Championships	R1	R1

Tournament	2018	2019	Best
BWF World Tour
Thailand Masters	R1	A	QF (2016)
Indonesia Masters	R1	R1	R2 (2013, 2016)
Malaysia Open	R1	A	R1 (2018)
Indonesia Open	R1	A	R1 (2017, 2018)
Thailand Open	R2	A	QF (2016)
(India) Hyderabad Open	R2 (WS); R2 (WD)	A	R2 (2018)
Chinese Taipei Open	R1	A	R2 (2016)
Indonesia Masters Super 100	R1	R1	R1 (2018, 2019)
Hong Kong Open	R1	A	R1 (2018)
(India) Syed Modi International	QF	A	QF (2018)
Year-end Ranking	49 (WS); 448 (WD)	216	31
Tournament	2018	2019	Best

Tournament	2017	Best
BWF Super Series
All England Open	R2	R2 (2017)
Singapore Open	R1	R1 (2017)
Indonesia Open	R1	R1 (2017)
(France) French Open	R1	R1 (2017)
Year-end Ranking	36	

Tournament	2013	2014	2015	2016	2017	Best
BWF Grand Prix and Grand Prix Gold
Malaysia Masters	A	R1	R1	A	QF	QF (2017)
(India) Syed Modi International	—N/a	A			R2	R2 (2017)
Thailand Masters	—N/a	—N/a	—N/a	QF	A	QF (2016)
(Switzerland) Swiss Open	A				R2	R2 (2017)
New Zealand Open	A				QF	QF (2017)
Chinese Taipei Open	A			R2	A	R2 (2016)
Vietnam Open	R2	A	R2	R2	SF	SF (2017)
Thailand Open	A	—N/a	R1	QF	A	QF (2016)
(Netherlands) Dutch Open	A	R1	A			R1 (2014)
(Germany) Bitburger Open	A				QF	QF (2017)
(South Korea) Korea Masters	A		R1	A		R1 (2015)
Chinese Taipei Masters	—N/a		A	R2	—N/a	R2 (2016)
Macau Open	A	1Q	A	R2	A	R2 (2016)
(Indonesia) Indonesian Masters	R2	R1	R1	R2	—N/a	R2 (2013, 2016)
Year-end Ranking	106	137	97	43	36	

== Record against selected opponents ==
Head to head (H2H) against World Superseries Final finalists, World Championships semifinalists, and Olympic quarterfinalists.

- (China) Yao Xue 0–1
- (India) Saina Nehwal 0–1
- (South Korea) Sung Ji-hyun 0–1
