= Tsai Chia-hsin =

Taiwanese badminton player

Tsai Chia-hsin 蔡佳欣
Personal information
- Born: 25 July 1982 (age 44) Tainan, Taiwan
- Height: 1.81 m (5 ft 11 in)
- Weight: 81 kg (179 lb)

Sport
- Country: Republic of China (Taiwan)
- Sport: Badminton
- Handedness: Right

Men's doubles
- Highest ranking: 3 (10 December 2010)
- BWF profile
Medal record
Men's badminton
Representing Chinese Taipei
Asian Games
Bronze medal – third place	2014 Incheon	Men's team
Asia Championships
Bronze medal – third place	2007 Johor Bahru	Men's doubles
East Asian Games
Gold medal – first place	2009 Hong Kong	Men's doubles
Gold medal – first place	2013 Tianjin	Men's doubles
Bronze medal – third place	2013 Tianjin	Men's team
Summer Universiade
Silver medal – second place	2007 Bangkok	Men's doubles
Bronze medal – third place	2007 Bangkok	Mixed team
Asian Junior Championships
Bronze medal – third place	2000 Kyoto	Mixed doubles

Tsai Chia-hsin (Chinese: 蔡佳欣; pinyin: Cài Jiāxīn; Wade–Giles: Ts'ai Chia-hsin; born 25 July 1982) is a Taiwanese former badminton player. He competed at the 2006 and 2014 Asian Games. Tsai also competed (for the Republic of China as Chinese Taipei) in the 2004 Summer Olympics in mixed doubles with partner Cheng Wen-hsing and in 2016 Summer Olympics in men's doubles with partner Lee Sheng-mu. In 2004, they defeated Chris Dednam and Antoinette Uys of South Africa in the first round but lost to Zhang Jun and Gao Ling of China in the round of 16.

== Achievements ==
=== Asian Championships ===
Men's doubles
Year	Venue	Partner	Opponent	Score	Result
2007	Stadium Bandaraya; Johor Bahru, Malaysia	(Chinese Taipei) Hu Chung-hsien	(Malaysia) Koo Kien Keat (Malaysia) Tan Boon Heong	21–18, 16–21, 10–21	Bronze

=== East Asian Games ===
Men's doubles
Year	Venue	Partner	Opponent	Score	Result
2009	Queen Elizabeth Stadium; Hong Kong	(Chinese Taipei) Hu Chung-hsien	(Chinese Taipei) Chen Hung-ling (Chinese Taipei) Lin Yu-lang	21–17, 22–20	Gold
2013	Binhai New Area Dagang Gymnasium; Tianjin, China	(Chinese Taipei) Lee Sheng-mu	(Chinese Taipei) Chen Hung-ling (Chinese Taipei) Lu Chia-pin	21–8, 21–18	Gold

=== Summer Universiade ===
Men's doubles
Year	Venue	Partner	Opponent	Score	Result
2007	Thammasat University; Pathum Thani, hailand	(Chinese Taipei) Hsieh Yu-hsing	(Thailand) Sudket Prapakamol (Thailand) Phattapol Ngensrisuk	21–17, 17–21, 14–21	Silver

=== Asian Junior Championships ===
Mixed doubles
Year	Venue	Partner	Opponent	Score	Result
2000	Nishiyama Park Gymnasium; Kyoto, Japan	(Chinese Taipei) Cheng Wen-hsing	(China) Zheng Bo (China) Wei Yili	3–15, 5–15	Bronze

=== BWF Superseries ===
The BWF Superseries, which was launched on 14 December 2006 and implemented in 2007, was a series of elite badminton tournaments, sanctioned by the Badminton World Federation (BWF). BWF Superseries levels were Superseries and Superseries Premier. A season of Superseries consisted of twelve tournaments around the world that had been introduced since 2011. Successful players were invited to the Superseries Finals, which were held at the end of each year.

Men's doubles
Year	Tournament	Partner	Opponent	Score	Result
2014	Singapore Open	(Chinese Taipei) Lee Sheng-mu	(China) Cai Yun (China) Lu Kai	19–21, 14–21	(silver) Runner-up
2014	Australian Open	(Chinese Taipei) Lee Sheng-mu	(South Korea) Lee Yong-dae (South Korea) Yoo Yeon-seong	14–21, 18–21	(silver) Runner-up

BWF Super Series tournament

=== BWF Grand Prix ===
The BWF Grand Prix had two levels, the Grand Prix and Grand Prix Gold. It was a series of badminton tournaments sanctioned by the Badminton World Federation (BWF) and played between 2007 and 2017.

Men's doubles
Year	Tournament	Partner	Opponent	Score	Result
2012	Macau Open	(Chinese Taipei) Lee Sheng-mu	(Russia) Vladimir Ivanov (Russia) Ivan Sozonov	14–21, 21–17, 21–16	(gold) Winner
2013	Chinese Taipei Open	(Chinese Taipei) Lee Sheng-mu	(South Korea) Kim Gi-jung (South Korea) Kim Sa-rang	11–21, 11–21	(silver) Runner-up
2013	Macau Open	(Chinese Taipei) Lee Sheng-mu	(Malaysia) Hoon Thien How (Malaysia) Tan Wee Kiong	16–21, 19–21	(silver) Runner-up
2016	Swiss Open	(Chinese Taipei) Lee Sheng-mu	(Denmark) Kim Astrup (Denmark) Anders Skaarup Rasmussen	8–21, 15–21	(silver) Runner-up

BWF Grand Prix Gold tournament

=== BWF International Challenge/Series ===
Men's doubles
Year	Tournament	Partner	Opponent	Score	Result
2010	Kaohsiung International	(Chinese Taipei) Liao Chao-hsiang	(Thailand) Bodin Isara (Thailand) Maneepong Jongjit	18–21, 19–21	(silver) Runner-up

BWF International Challenge tournament
