= Chen Hsiao-huan =

Taiwanese badminton player (born 1987)

Chen Hsiao-huan 陳曉歡
Personal information
- Born: 12 March 1987 (age 39) Kaohsiung, Taiwan
- Height: 1.57 m (5 ft 2 in)
- Weight: 48 kg (106 lb)

Sport
- Country: Republic of China (Taiwan)
- Sport: Badminton
- Handedness: Right

Women's singles & doubles
- Highest ranking: 55 (WS 8 April 2010); 41 (WD 10 November 2016); 31 (XD with Liao Min-chun 9 March 2017)
- BWF profile
Medal record
Women's badminton
Representing Chinese Taipei
East Asian Games
Silver medal – second place	2013 Tianjin	Women's team
Asian Junior Championships
Bronze medal – third place	2004 Hwacheon	Girls' team

Chen Hsiao-huan (Chinese: 陳曉歡; born 12 March 1987) is a Taiwanese badminton player. Born in Kaohsiung City, Chen has been playing badminton since the age of 11; she is 1.57 m tall and plays right-handed. In 2015, she won the women's singles event at the national badminton championships after beat Hu Ling-fang with the score 20–22, 21–9, 21–15. She participated at the 2009, 2010, 2011, 2013 and 2015 World Championships.

== Achievements ==
=== BWF Grand Prix ===
The BWF Grand Prix had two levels, the Grand Prix and Grand Prix Gold. It was a series of badminton tournaments sanctioned by the Badminton World Federation (BWF) and played between 2007 and 2017.

Mixed doubles

Year	Tournament	Partner	Opponent	Score	Result
2013	Vietnam Open	(Chinese Taipei) Liao Min-chun	(South Korea) Choi Sol-gyu (South Korea) Chae Yoo-jung	20–22, 21–19, 14–21	(silver) Runner-up
2017	China Masters	(Chinese Taipei) Liao Min-chun	(China) Wang Yilyu (China) Huang Dongping	14–21, 10–21	(silver) Runner-up

BWF Grand Prix Gold tournament
BWF Grand Prix tournament
