= Wu Hsiao-lin =

Taiwanese badminton player (born 1995)

Wu Hsiao-lin 巫孝霖
Personal information
- Born: 4 February 1995 (age 31) Kaohsiung, Taiwan
- Height: 1.75 m (5 ft 9 in)

Sport
- Country: Republic of China (Taiwan)
- Sport: Badminton
- Handedness: Right

Men's & mixed doubles
- Highest ranking: 39 (MD 2 June 2016); 68 (XD 3 December 2015)
- BWF profile
Medal record
Men's badminton
Representing Chinese Taipei
World Junior Championships
| Bronze medal – third place | 2011 Taipei | Mixed team |
Asia Junior Championships
| Silver medal – second place | 2012 Gimcheon | Boys' doubles |

Wu Hsiao-lin (Chinese: 巫孝霖; pinyin: Wū Xiàolín; born 4 February 1995) is a badminton player from Taiwan. In 2012, he won the silver medal at the Asian Junior Championships in the boys' doubles event partnered with Wang Chi-lin. Teamed-up with Lin Chia-yu, they reach the Vietnam Open finals. They failed to win the title after being beaten by the Indonesian pair in three sets. He and Lin won the men's doubles title at the Malaysia International tournament in 2014 and 2015. They also won the 2015 USA International tournament in the men's doubles event.

== Achievements ==
=== Asian Junior Championships ===
Boys' doubles
| Year | Venue | Partner | Opponent | Score | Result |
|---|---|---|---|---|---|
| 2012 | Gimcheon Indoor Stadium; Gimcheon, South Korea | (Chinese Taipei) Wang Chi-lin | (Indonesia) Arya Maulana Aldiartama (Indonesia) Edi Subaktiar | 21–17, 20–22, 10–21 | Silver |

=== BWF Grand Prix ===
The BWF Grand Prix has two levels, the BWF Grand Prix and Grand Prix Gold. It is a series of badminton tournaments sanctioned by the Badminton World Federation (BWF) since 2007.

Men's doubles
| Year | Tournament | Partner | Opponent | Score | Result |
|---|---|---|---|---|---|
| 2013 | Vietnam Open | (Chinese Taipei) Lin Chia-yu | (Indonesia) Fran Kurniawan (Indonesia) Bona Septano | 21–18, 18–21, 18–21 | (silver) Runner-up |

BWF Grand Prix Gold tournament
BWF Grand Prix tournament

=== BWF International Challenge/Series ===
Men's doubles
| Year | Tournament | Partner | Opponent | Score | Result |
|---|---|---|---|---|---|
| 2014 | Malaysia International | (Chinese Taipei) Lin Chia-yu | (Malaysia) Chow Pak Chuu (Malaysia) Mak Hee Chun | 21–12, 10–21, 22–20 | (gold) Winner |
| 2015 | Malaysia International | (Chinese Taipei) Lin Chia-yu | (Chinese Taipei) Lee Jhe-huei (Chinese Taipei) Lee Yang | 17–21, 21–16, 21–18 | (gold) Winner |
| 2015 | USA International | (Chinese Taipei) Lin Chia-yu | (Germany) Michael Fuchs (Germany) Johannes Schöttler | 16–21, 23–21, 21–19 | (gold) Winner |

BWF International Challenge tournament
BWF International Series tournament
BWF Future Series tournament
