= Jung Jae-wook =

South Korean badminton player (born 1994)

Personal information
- Born: 24 March 1994 (age 32)

Sport
- Country: South Korea
- Sport: Badminton
- Handedness: Right

Men's doubles
- Highest ranking: 85 (23 January 2014)
- Current ranking: 120 (21 June 2018)
- BWF profile
Medal record
Men's badminton
Representing South Korea
World Junior Championships
Silver medal – second place	2011 Taipei	Mixed team
Bronze medal – third place	2012 Chiba	Mixed team
Asian Junior Championships
Bronze medal – third place	2012 Gimcheon	Mixed team

Jung Jae-wook (Korean: 정재욱; born 24 March 1994) is a South Korean badminton player. Jung who was educated at the Munsu high school, was part of the South Korean junior team that won the silver medal in 2011 and the bronze medal in 2012 at the World Junior Championships. At the 2012 Asian Junior Championships, he also helped the team claim the bronze medal. Partnered with Kim Gi-jung for the Samsung Electro-Mechanics, they won the Summer National Championships in 2017 and 2018. In the international event, they were the finalist at the 2017 Korea Masters in the men's doubles event. He studied at the Korea National Sport University.

== Achievements ==
=== BWF Grand Prix ===
The BWF Grand Prix has two levels: Grand Prix and Grand Prix Gold. It is a series of badminton tournaments, sanctioned by Badminton World Federation (BWF) since 2007.

Men's doubles

Year	Tournament	Partner	Opponent	Score	Result
2017	Korea Masters	(South Korea) Kim Gi-jung	(South Korea) Kim Won-ho (South Korea) Seo Seung-jae	15–21, 16–21	(silver) Runner-up

BWF Grand Prix Gold tournament
BWF Grand Prix tournament
