= Yoo Chae-ran =

South Korean badminton player (born 1992)

Personal information
- Born: Yoo Hae-won; 7 November 1992 (age 34) Gwangju, South Korea
- Height: 1.66 m (5 ft 5 in)
- Weight: 58 kg (128 lb)

Sport
- Country: South Korea
- Sport: Badminton
- Handedness: Right

Women's & mixed doubles
- Highest ranking: 9 (WD 12 December 2013); 94 (XD 4 December 2017)
- BWF profile
Medal record
Women's badminton
Representing South Korea
Uber Cup
Silver medal – second place	2016 Kunsan	Women's team
Bronze medal – third place	2014 New Delhi	Women's team
Asian Games
Silver medal – second place	2014 Incheon	Women's team
Asian Championships
Silver medal – second place	2017 Wuhan	Women's doubles
Bronze medal – third place	2013 Taipei	Women's doubles
Asia Team Championships
Bronze medal – third place	2016 Hyderabad	Women's team
Summer Universiade
Gold medal – first place	2015 Gwangju	Mixed team
Bronze medal – third place	2015 Gwangju	Women's doubles

Yoo Chae-ran

Korean name
- Hangul: 유해원
- Hanja: 柳海媛
- RR: Yu Haewon
- MR: Yu Haewŏn

Yoo Chae-ran (born 7 November 1992 as Yoo Hae-won Korean: 유해원) is a South Korean badminton player who joined the South Korea national badminton team in 2011. At the Asian Championships, she won women's doubles bronze medal in 2013 and silver medal in 2017.

== Achievements ==
=== Asia Championships ===
Women's doubles
Year	Venue	Partner	Opponent	Score	Result
2013	Taipei Arena; Taipei, Taiwan	(South Korea) Go Ah-ra	(China) Wang Xiaoli (China) Yu Yang	15–21, 17–21	Bronze
2017	Wuhan Sports Center Gymnasium; Wuhan, China	(South Korea) Kim Hye-rin	(Japan) Misaki Matsutomo (Japan) Ayaka Takahashi	19–21, 21–16, 10–21	Silver

=== Summer Universiade ===
Women's doubles
Year	Venue	Partner	Opponent	Score	Result
2015	Hwasun Hanium Culture Sports Center; Hwasun, South Korea	(South Korea) Go Ah-ra	~~(China) Ou Dongni~~; ~~(China) Yu Xiaohan~~ (disqualified)	22–24, 21–15, 15–21	Bronze

=== BWF Grand Prix (1 title, 3 runners-up) ===
The BWF Grand Prix had two levels, the BWF Grand Prix and Grand Prix Gold. It was a series of badminton tournaments sanctioned by the Badminton World Federation (BWF) which was held from 2007 to 2017.

Women's doubles
Year	Tournament	Partner	Opponent	Score	Result
2013	Vietnam Open	(South Korea) Go Ah-ra	(Malaysia) Amelia Alicia Anscelly (Malaysia) Soong Fie Cho	12–21, 21–10, 21–9	(gold) Winner
2013	Korea Grand Prix Gold	(South Korea) Go Ah-ra	(South Korea) Jang Ye-na (South Korea) Kim So-young	15–21, 12–21	(silver) Runner-up
2014	Korea Grand Prix	(South Korea) Chang Ye-na	(South Korea) Lee So-hee (South Korea) Shin Seung-chan	8–15 retired	(silver) Runner-up
2017	Chinese Taipei Open	(South Korea) Kim Hye-rin	(South Korea) Chae Yoo-jung (South Korea) Kim So-yeong	12–21, 11–21	(silver) Runner-up

BWF Grand Prix Gold tournament
BWF Grand Prix tournament

=== BWF International Challenge/Series (2 titles, 1 runner-up) ===
Women's doubles
Year	Tournament	Partner	Opponent	Score	Result
2012	Iceland International	(South Korea) Go Ah-ra	(South Korea) Lee So-hee (South Korea) Shin Seung-chan	18–21, 16–21	(silver) Runner-up
2017	Osaka International	(South Korea) Kim So-yeong	(Japan) Ayako Sakuramoto (Japan) Yukiko Takahata	16–21, 21–17, 21–19	(gold) Winner
2018	Dubai International	(South Korea) Go Ah-ra	(South Korea) Bang Ji-sun (South Korea) Jeon Joo-i	21–14, 21–15	(gold) Winner

BWF International Challenge tournament
BWF International Series tournament
