= Go Ah-ra (badminton) =

South Korean badminton player (born 1992)

Personal information
- Born: 21 September 1992 (age 34) Jeonnam Province, South Korea
- Height: 1.65 m (5 ft 5 in)

Sport
- Country: South Korea
- Sport: Badminton
- Handedness: Right

Women's & mixed doubles
- Highest ranking: 9 (WD 12 December 2013); 72 (XD 12 December 2013
- BWF profile
Medal record
Women's badminton
Representing South Korea
Uber Cup
Silver medal – second place	2016 Kunshan	Women's team
Bronze medal – third place	2014 New Delhi	Women's team
Asian Games
Silver medal – second place	2014 Incheon	Women's team
Asian Championships
Bronze medal – third place	2013 Taipei	Women's doubles
Asian Team Championships
Bronze medal – third place	2016 Hyderabad	Women's team
Summer Universiade
Gold medal – first place	2015 Gwangju	Mixed team
Bronze medal – third place	2015 Gwangju	Women's doubles
Bronze medal – third place	2015 Gwangju	Mixed doubles

- Go Ah-ra
- Hangul: 고아라
- RR: Go Ara
- MR: Ko Ara

Go Ah-ra (born 21 September 1992) is a South Korean badminton player, specializing in doubles play. Go won 2013 Vietnam Open Grand Prix with her partner Yoo Hae-won, she and Yoo also won the bronze medal at the 2013 Badminton Asia Championships. In 2016, she won the silver medal at the 2016 Uber Cup with Korean women's badminton team.

== Achievements ==
=== Asian Championships ===
Women's doubles
Year	Venue	Partner	Opponent	Score	Result
2013	Taipei Arena; Taipei, Taiwan	(South Korea) Yoo Hae-won	(China) Wang Xiaoli (China) Yu Yang	15–21, 17–21	Bronze

=== Summer Universiade ===
Women's doubles
Year	Venue	Partner	Opponent	Score	Result
2015	Hwasun Hanium Culture Sports Center; Hwasun, South Korea	(South Korea) Yoo Hae-won	~~(China) Ou Dongni~~; ~~(China) Yu Xiaohan~~ (disqualified)	22–24, 21–15, 15–21	Bronze

Mixed doubles
Year	Venue	Partner	Opponent	Score	Result
2015	Hwasun Hanium Culture Sports Center; Hwasun, South Korea	(South Korea) Kim Sa-rang	(South Korea) Kim Gi-jung (South Korea) Shin Seung-chan	10–21, 17–21	Bronze

=== BWF Grand Prix (1 title, 1 runner-up) ===
The BWF Grand Prix had two levels, the BWF Grand Prix and Grand Prix Gold. It was a series of badminton tournaments sanctioned by the Badminton World Federation (BWF) which was held from 2007 to 2017.

Women's doubles
Year	Tournament	Partner	Opponent	Score	Result
2013	Vietnam Open	(South Korea) Yoo Hae-won	(Malaysia) Amelia Alicia Anscelly (Malaysia) Soong Fie Cho	12–21, 21–10, 21–9	(gold) Winner
2013	Korea Grand Prix Gold	(South Korea) Yoo Hae-won	(South Korea) Jang Ye-na (South Korea) Kim So-young	15–21, 12–21	(silver) Runner-up

BWF Grand Prix Gold tournament
BWF Grand Prix tournament

=== BWF International Challenge/Series (1 title, 1 runner-up) ===
Women's doubles
Year	Tournament	Partner	Opponent	Score	Result
2012	Iceland International	(South Korea) Yoo Hae-won	(South Korea) Lee So-hee (South Korea) Shin Seung-chan	18–21, 16–21	(silver) Runner-up
2018	Dubai International	(South Korea) Yoo Chae-ran	(South Korea) Bang Ji-sun (South Korea) Jeon Joo-i	21–14, 21–15	(gold) Winner

BWF International Challenge tournament
BWF International Series tournament
