= Tam Chun Hei =

Hong Kong badminton player

Tam Chun Hei 譚進希
Personal information
- Born: 2 August 1993 (age 33)
- Height: 1.72 m (5 ft 8 in)

Sport
- Country: Hong Kong
- Sport: Badminton
- Event: Men's doubles & Mixed doubles

Men's doubles & Mixed doubles
- BWF profile
Medal record
Men's badminton
Representing Hong Kong
Asia Mixed Team Championships
Bronze medal – third place	2019 Hong Kong	Mixed team

Tam Chun Hei (traditional Chinese: 譚進希; simplified Chinese: 谭进希; born 2 August 1993) is a badminton player from Hong Kong. He is 172 cm tall. He lives in Hong Kong. He made his International Debut in 2009, at the Macau Open Grand Prix Gold.

== Career ==
Tam began playing badminton at age 15. He has been a National Team Member since age 16. When he was 17 years old, he began playing badminton full-time. Tam made his professional debut at the 2010 Hong Kong Super Series.

Tam Chun Hei participated in the Badminton Junior World Championships in 2009, 2010 and 2011. In 2010 and 2011 he was in the main draw of the Hong Kong Super Series, in 2011 and 2012 in the main draw of the Macau Open. He finished third at the German Juniors 2012. At the Badminton Asia Cup 2013, he retired in the first round.

== Achievements ==
Year	Tournament	Level	Partner	Result
2017	Malaysia Masters	Gold Grand Prix	Ng Tsz Yau	Semifinal
2017	Singapore Badminton International Series	International series	Mak Hee Chun	Semifinal
2018	Singapore Badminton International Series	International series	Chung Yonny (zh)	Gold
2019	Badminton Asia Mixed Team Championships	Other	-	Bronze
