= 2011 BWF World Junior Championships – Mixed doubles =

2011 BWF World Junior Championships Mixed doubles
Tournament details
- Dates: 2 – 6 November 2011
- Edition: 13th
- Level: International
- Venue: Taoyuan Arena
- Location: Taoyuan City. Taipei, Taiwan

The Mixed Doubles tournament of the 2011 BWF World Junior Championships is a badminton world junior individual championships for the Eye Level Cups, held on November 2–6. The defending champion of the last edition is Liu Cheng / Bao Yixin from China. Indonesian pair Alfian Eko Prasetya and Gloria Emanuelle Widjaja won the gold medal after beat their compatriot Ronald Alexander and Tiara Rosalia Nuraidah in the final round with the score 12–21, 21–17, and 25–23.

== Seeds ==
The seeds based from the Continental Confederation's recommendation, players performance at the Suhandinata Cup and also using the latest world ranking as a guideline.

1. (Indonesia) Lukhi Apri Nugroho / Ririn Amelia (third round)
2. (Thailand) Wannawat Ampunsuwan / Chonthicha Kittiharakul (quarter-final)
3. (Malaysia) Nelson Heg / Chow Mei Kuan (semi-final)
4. (Netherlands) Jim Middleburg / Soraya de Visch Eibergen (fourth round)
5. (Russia) Anatoliy Yartsev / Evgeniya Kosetskaya (fourth round)
6. (Chinese Taipei) Huang Po-jui / Wu Ti-jung (fourth round)
7. (France) Joris Grosjean / Lea Palermo (fourth round)
8. (Denmark) Frederik Colberg / Mette Poulsen (fourth round)
9. (Indonesia) Hafiz Faizal / Shella Devi Aulia (fourth round)
10. (Denmark) Kasper Antonsen / Line Kjærsfeldt (quarter-final)
11. (South Korea) Lee Hong-je / Shin Seung-chan (quarter-final)
12. (France) Gaetan Mittelheisser / Lorraine Baumann (second round)
13. (Netherlands) Russell Muns / Myke Halkema (fourth round)
14. (Malaysia) Calvin Ong Jia Hong / Lee Meng Yean (third round)
15. (Chinese Taipei) Wang Chih-hao / Chen Pai-jou (third round)
16. (Indonesia) Ronald Alexander / Tiara Rosalia Nuraidah (final)

== Draw ==
=== Finals ===
Quarterfinals
(South Korea) Choi Sol-gyu (South Korea) Chae Yoo-jung	21	21
(Hong Kong) Lee Chun Hei (Hong Kong) Cheung Ngan Yi	15	10
(Indonesia) Alfian Eko Prasetya (Indonesia) Gloria Emanuelle Widjaja	16	21	21
9/16	(South Korea) Lee Hong-je (South Korea) Shin Seung-chan	21	16	19
9/16	(Denmark) Kasper Antonsen (Denmark) Line Kjærsfeldt	18	17
3/4	(Malaysia) Nelson Heg (Malaysia) Chow Mei Kuan	21	21
9/16	(Indonesia) Ronald Alexander (Indonesia) Tiara Rosalia Nuraidah	21	21
2	(Thailand) Wannawat Ampunsuwan (Thailand) Chonthicha Kittiharakul	15	16

Semifinals
(South Korea) Choi Sol-gyu (South Korea) Chae Yoo-jung	18	13
(Indonesia) Alfian Eko Prasetya (Indonesia) Gloria Emanuelle Widjaja	21	21
3/4	(Malaysia) Nelson Heg (Malaysia) Chow Mei Kuan	17	22	16
9/16	(Indonesia) Ronald Alexander (Indonesia) Tiara Rosalia Nuraidah	21	20	21

Final
(Indonesia) Alfian Eko Prasetya (Indonesia) Gloria Emanuelle Widjaja	12	21	25
9/16	(Indonesia) Ronald Alexander (Indonesia) Tiara Rosalia Nuraidah	21	17	23

=== Top Half ===
==== Section 1 ====
First round

Second round
1	(Indonesia) L Nugroho (Indonesia) R Amelia	10	21	21
(England) R Walker (England) S Brown	21	18	10
(South Korea) Choi S-g (South Korea) Chae Y-j	21	21
(Australia) T Wong (Australia) J Guan	12	8
9/16	(Malaysia) C Ong (Malaysia) Lee MY	21	21
(Finland) O Larkimo (Finland) A Mikkelä	17	18
(Chinese Taipei) Lin C-Y (Chinese Taipei) Shuai P-L	21	15	21
(Japan) T Inoue (Japan) N Shinoya	19	21	16

Third round
1	(Indonesia) L Nugroho (Indonesia) R Amelia	21	15	20
(South Korea) Choi S-g (South Korea) Chae Y-j	19	21	22
9/16	(Malaysia) C Ong (Malaysia) Lee MY	19	16
(Chinese Taipei) Lin C-Y (Chinese Taipei) Shuai P-L	21	21

Fourth round
(South Korea) Choi S-g (South Korea) Chae Y-j	21	21
(Chinese Taipei) Lin C-Y (Chinese Taipei) Shuai P-L	19	17

==== Section 2 ====
First round
(Netherlands) R Tabeling (Netherlands) G Mahulette	15	12
(Hong Kong) Lee CH (Hong Kong) Cheung NY	21	21

Second round
5/8	(Russia) A Yartsev (Russia) E Kosertskaya	21	21
(Czech Republic) V Šelong (Czech Republic) J Žwaková	10	12
(Canada) C Wong (Canada) K Tung	15	16
(Germany) M Byerly (Germany) J Karnott	21	21
9/16	(France) G Mittelheisser (France) L Baumann	17	13
(Thailand) S Tovannakasem (Thailand) W Hongchookeat	21	21
(Turkey) A Şenol (Turkey) E Tunalı	14	17
(Hong Kong) Lee CH (Hong Kong) Cheung NY	21	21

Third round
5/8	(Russia) A Yartsev (Russia) E Kosetskaya	21	20	21
(Germany) M Byerly (Germany) J Karnott	13	22	11
(Thailand) S Tovannakasem (Thailand) W Hongchookeat	16	21	17
(Hong Kong) Lee CH (Hong Kong) Cheung NY	21	18	21

Fourth round
5/8	(Russia) A Yartsev (Russia) E Kosetskaya	12	18
(Hong Kong) Lee CH (Hong Kong) Cheung NY	21	21

==== Section 3 ====
First round
(India) H Thandarang (India) A Sunil	14	13
(Indonesia) A Prasetya (Indonesia) G Widjaja	21	21

Second round
3/4	(Netherlands) J Middleburg (Netherlands) S Eibergen	21	21
(Egypt) Y El Fattah (Egypt) T Aya	7	5
(France) J Maio (France) D Lansac	21	22
(Malaysia) Tai AK (Malaysia) SJ Lai	18	20
9/16	(Chinese Taipei) Wang C-H (Chinese Taipei) Chen P-J	21	21
(United States) A Susanto (United States) D Long	12	11
(Sri Lanka) C Karunaratne (Sri Lanka) K Sirimannage	8	15
(Indonesia) A Prasetya (Indonesia) G Widjaja	21	21

Third round
3/4	(Netherlands) J Middleburg (Netherlands) S Eibergen	23	21
(France) J Maio (France) D Lansac	21	12
9/16	(Chinese Taipei) Wang C-H (Chinese Taipei) Chen P-J	25	7
(Indonesia) A Prasetya (Indonesia) G Widjaja	27	21

Fourth round
3/4	(Netherlands) J Middleburg (Netherlands) S Eibergen	22	12	16
(Indonesia) A Prasetya (Indonesia) G Widjaja	20	21	21

==== Section 4 ====
First round
(Thailand) S Thammasin (Thailand) N Lam	21	21
(Finland) A Danskanen (Finland) S Pekkola	16	11

Second round
5/8	(Denmark) F Colberg (Denmark) M Poulsen	21	21
(Japan) N Sekiguchi (Japan) A Ohori	12	17
(Mexico) A Quadri (Mexico) M Ugalde	6	12
(Canada) A Lau (Canada) B So	21	21
9/16	(South Korea) Lee H-J (South Korea) Shin S-C	21	21
(Hong Kong) Law CH (Hong Kong) Yung NW	11	17
(Macau) Lou H-M (Macau) Wong K-I	5	9
(Thailand) S Thammasin (Thailand) N Lam	21	21

Third round
5/8	(Denmark) F Colberg (Denmark) M Poulsen	21	21
(Canada) A Lau (Canada) B So	16	11
9/16	(South Korea) Lee H-J (South Korea) Shin S-C	21	21
(Thailand) S Thammasin (Thailand) N Lam	15	13

Fourth round
5/8	(Denmark) F Colberg (Denmark) M Poulsen	11	21	18
9/16	(South Korea) Lee H-J (South Korea) Shin S-C	21	19	21

=== Bottom Half ===
==== Section 5 ====
First round
(Turkey) E Lale (Turkey) N Kılıç	8^{r}
(England) T Wolfenden (England) H Smith	20

Second round
(England) T Wolfenden (England) H Smith	14	21	14
(Russia) S Sirant (Russia) R Gabdullina	21	18	21
(Egypt) H Samy (Egypt) R Osman	5	9
9/16	(Denmark) K Antonsen (Denmark) L Kjærsfeldt	21	21
(India) S Kidambi (India) M Kukkapalli	24	17	13
(Hong Kong) Tam CH (Hong Kong) Yuen SY	22	21	21
(South Korea) Jun B-C (South Korea) Lee S-H	16	21	18
5/8	(Chinese Taipei) Huang P-J (Chinese Taipei) Wu T-J	21	16	21

Third round
(Russia) S Sirant (Russia) R Gabdullina	15	14
9/16	(Denmark) K Antonsen (Denmark) L Kjærsfeldt	21	21
(Hong Kong) Tam CH (Hong Kong) Yuen SY	17	14
5/8	(Chinese Taipei) Huang P-j (Chinese Taipei) Wu T-j	21	21

Fourth round
9/16	(Denmark) K Antonsen (Denmark) L Kjærsfeldt	21	21
5/8	(Chinese Taipei) Huang P-j (Chinese Taipei) Wu T-j	11	7

==== Section 6 ====
First round
(Philippines) M Cudiamat (Philippines) J De Vera	8	16
(Singapore) A Ishak (Singapore) Tan WH	21	21

Second round
(Singapore) A Ishak (Singapore) Tan WH	21	15	21
(United States) J Kuo (United States) E Kan	14	21	12
(Australia) A Selladurai (Australia) G Somerville	13	8
9/16	(Indonesia) H Faizal (Indonesia) S Aulia	21	21
(Canada) N Yakura (Canada) C Tsai	25	21
(Japan) D Watanabe (Japan) C Hoshi	23	14
(Germany) M Laibacher (Germany) L Wich	11	17
3/4	(Malaysia) N Heg (Malaysia) Chow MK	21	21

Third round
(Singapore) A Ishak (Singapore) Tan WH	14	11
9/16	(Indonesia) H Faizal (Indonesia) S Aulia	21	21
(Canada) N Yakura (Canada) C Tsai	22	14	16
3/4	(Malaysia) N Heg (Malaysia) Chow MK	20	21	21

Fourth round
9/16	(Indonesia) H Faizal (Indonesia) S Aulia	21	19	21
3/4	(Malaysia) N Heg (Malaysia) Chow MK	18	21	23

==== Section 7 ====
First round
(Canada) A Wilkinson (Canada) J Chan	13	19
(Australia) PS Low (Australia) V Mak	21	21

Second round
(Australia) PS Low (Australia) V Mak	7	7
(Chinese Taipei) Wang C-L (Chinese Taipei) Chen S-Y	21	21
(Turkey) T Özsoy (Turkey) Ö Toyran	21	7	15
9/16	(Indonesia) R Alexander (Indonesia) T Nuraidah	18	21	21
(South Korea) Bae K-Y (South Korea) Kim C-M	21	21
(Egypt) M Elsayad (Egypt) N Ashraf	13	16
(Russia) R Kargaev (Russia) O Morozova	17	17
5/8	(France) J Grosjean (France) L Palermo	21	21

Third round
(Chinese Taipei) Wang C-L (Chinese Taipei) Chen S-Y	8	21	20
9/16	(Indonesia) R Alexander (Indonesia) T Nuraidah	21	15	22
(South Korea) Bae K-Y (South Korea) Kim C-M	19	20
5/8	(France) J Grosjean (France) L Palermo	21	22

Fourth round
9/16	(Indonesia) R Alexander (Indonesia) T Nuraidah	22	21
5/8	(France) J Grosjean (France) L Palermo	20	14

==== Section 8 ====
First round

Second round
(United States) A Khor (United States) L Tong	10	10
(England) R McCarthy (England) E Westwood	21	21
(Malaysia) S Jani (Malaysia) J Choong	19	16
9/16	(Netherlands) R Muns (Netherlands) M Halkema	21	21
(Japan) T Saito (Japan) S Hayakawa	21	21
(Germany) M Lamsfuß (Germany) F Volkmann	14	19
(Finland) K Koljonen (Finland) J Nyström	15	14
2	(Thailand) W Ampunsuwan (Thailand) C Kittiharakul	21	21

Third round
(England) R McCarthy (England) E Westwood	20	20
9/16	(Netherlands) R Muns (Netherlands) M Halkema	22	22
(Japan) T Saito (Japan) S Hayakawa	13	13
2	(Thailand) W Ampunsuwan (Thailand) C Kittiharakul	21	21

Fourth round
9/16	(Netherlands) R Muns (Netherlands) M Halkema	15	16
2	(Thailand) W Ampunsuwan (Thailand) C Kittiharakul	21	21
