= 2014 Indonesian Masters Grand Prix Gold =

Tournament details
- Dates: 9 September 2014 – 14 September 2014
- Edition: 5th
- Total prize money: US$120,000
- Venue: Jakabaring Sport City
- Location: Palembang, South Sumatra, Indonesia

Champions
- Men's singles: (India) Prannoy Kumar
- Women's singles: (Indonesia) Adriyanti Firdasari
- Men's doubles: (Indonesia) Marcus Fernaldi Gideon (Indonesia) Markis Kido
- Women's doubles: (Indonesia) Shendy Puspa Irawati (Indonesia) Vita Marissa
- Mixed doubles: (Indonesia) Riky Widianto (Indonesia) Richi Puspita Dili

The 2014 Indonesian Masters Grand Prix Gold (officially known as the Yonex Sunrise Indonesian Masters 2014 for sponsorship reasons) was the thirteenth grand prix gold and grand prix tournament of the 2014 BWF Grand Prix Gold and Grand Prix. The tournament was held in Jakabaring Sport City, Palembang, Indonesia from 9–14 September 2014 and had a total purse of $120,000.

== Players by nation ==
| Nation | First Round | Second Round | Third Round | Quarterfinals | Semifinals | Final |
|---|---|---|---|---|---|---|
| (Indonesia) | 65 | 34 | 4 | 13 | 5 | 5 |
| (Malaysia) | 9 | 9 | | 2 | 3 | |
| (Singapore) | 2 | 1 | 2 | 2 | | |
| (Thailand) | 2 | | | | 1 | |
| (England) | 1 | 1 | | | | |
| (Russia) | 1 | 2 | | 1 | | |
| (India) | 1 | | 2 | 1 | | |
| (Canada) | 1 | | | | | |
| (Hong Kong) | | 1 | | | | |
| (United States) | | 1 | | | | |
| (Chinese Taipei) | | | | 1 | 1 | |
| (Netherlands) | | | | 1 | | |

== Men's singles ==
=== Seeds ===
1. (Indonesia) Dionysius Hayom Rumbaka (third round)
2. (Indonesia) Sony Dwi Kuncoro (third round)
3. (Singapore) Derek Wong (third round)
4. (India) Anand Pawar (third round)
5. (India) H. S. Prannoy (champion)
6. (India) Sai Praneeth Bhamidipati (quarter-final)
7. (Malaysia) Mohd Arif Abdul Latif (second round)
8. (Indonesia) Andre Kurniawan Tedjono (third round)
9. (Malaysia) Daren Liew (semi-final)
10. (Hong Kong) Tam Chun Hei (second round)
11. (Malaysia) Zulfadli Zulkiffli (semi-final)
12. (Indonesia) Wisnu Yuli Prasetyo (withdrew)
13. (Malaysia) Chan Kwong Beng (withdrew)
14. (India) Ajay Jayaram (third round)
15. (Indonesia) Riyanto Subagja (quarter-final)
16. (Indonesia) Evert Sukamta (third round)

=== Finals ===
Quarterfinals
9 | (Malaysia) Daren Liew | 21 | 21
6 | (India) B. Sai Praneeth | 15 | 16
15 | (Indonesia) Riyanto Subagja | 13 | 19
5 | (India) H. S. Prannoy | 21 | 21
Q2 | (Indonesia) Firman Abdul Kholik | 21 | 14 | 21
(Indonesia) Thomi Azizan Mahbub | 14 | 21 | 14
11 | (Malaysia) Zulfadli Zulkiffli | 21 | 21
(Indonesia) Rifan Fauzin Ivanudin | 19 | 12

Semifinals
9 | (Malaysia) Daren Liew | 14 | 21 | 14
5 | (India) H. S. Prannoy | 21 | 14 | 21
Q2 | (Indonesia) Firman Abdul Kholik | 21 | 21
11 | (Malaysia) Zulfadli Zulkiffli | 17 | 15

Final
5 | (India) H. S. Prannoy | 21 | 22
Q2 | (Indonesia) Firman Abdul Kholik | 11 | 20

=== Top half ===
==== Section 1 ====
First Round
1 | (Indonesia) H Rumbaka | 21 | 21
(Indonesia) H Kurniawan | 8 | 13
(Indonesia) K Wibowo | 20 | 21
(Malaysia) N Ayub | 22 | 23
9 | (Malaysia) D Liew | 21 | 21
(Indonesia) R Patriawan | 16 | 16
(Indonesia) F Hadmadi | 21 | 21
(Malaysia) Chong YH | 13 | 13

Second Round
1 | (Indonesia) H Rumbaka | 21 | 21
(Malaysia) N Ayub | 15 | 19
9 | (Malaysia) D Liew | 21 | 16 | 21
(Indonesia) F Hadmadi | 18 | 21 | 17

Third Round
1 | (Indonesia) H Rumbaka | 20 | 14
9 | (Malaysia) D Liew | 22 | 21

==== Section 2 ====
First Round
6 | (India) B S Praneeth | 21 | 21
(Indonesia) Siswanto | 10 | 9
(Malaysia) Tan KM | 21 | 21
(Indonesia) N Sulistyo | 19 | 15
14 | (India) A Jayaram | 21 | 21
(Indonesia) K Akbar | 5 | 4
(Indonesia) A Yunus | 13 | 21 | 21
(Singapore) S Lee | 21 | 13 | 17

Second Round
6 | (India) B S Praneeth | 21 | 18 | 21
(Malaysia) Tan KM | 19 | 21 | 17
14 | (India) A Jayaram | 13 | 21 | 21
(Indonesia) A Yunus | 21 | 19 | 16

Third Round
6 | (India) B S Praneeth | 21 | 14 | 23
14 | (India) A Jayaram | 16 | 21 | 21

==== Section 3 ====
First Round
3 | (Singapore) D Wong | 21 | 21
(Indonesia) A Ramadhan | 19 | 4
(Indonesia) R Megananda | 21 | 21
(England) M Spencer-Smith | 8 | 12
15 | (Indonesia) R Subagja | 21 | 21
Q7 | (Indonesia) N Ermansyah | 12 | 11
(Indonesia) A S Ginting | 21 | 18 | 18
(Singapore) Loh KY | 17 | 21 | 21

Second Round
3 | (Singapore) D Wong | 21 | 21
(Indonesia) R Megananda | 16 | 16
15 | (Indonesia) R Subagja | 21 | 21
(Singapore) Loh KY | 19 | 17

Third Round
3 | (Singapore) D Wong | 18 | 21 | 16
15 | (Indonesia) R Subagja | 21 | 9 | 21

==== Section 4 ====
First Round
5 | (India) H. S. Prannoy | 21 | 21
(Indonesia) P Sudrajat | 14 | 14
(Indonesia) B Pangisthu | 21 | 18 | 21
Q6 | (Indonesia) C Mamonto | 16 | 21 | 15
16 | (Indonesia) E Sukamta | 21 | 21
Q1 | (Indonesia) A Wijaya | 15 | 11
(Malaysia) Zh Zulkiffli | 16 | 16
(Indonesia) E Kusuma | 21 | 21

Second Round
5 | (India) H. S. Prannoy | 21 | 25 | 21
(Indonesia) B Pangisthu | 17 | 27 | 18
16 | (Indonesia) E Sukamta | 21 | 21
(Indonesia) E Kusuma | 18 | 10

Third Round
5 | (India) H. S. Prannoy | 21 | 13 | 21
16 | (Indonesia) E Sukamta | 18 | 21 | 15

=== Bottom half ===
==== Section 5 ====
First Round
Q2 | (Indonesia) FA Kholik | 17 | 21 | 21
(Indonesia) J Christie | 21 | 18 | 18
(Indonesia) V Anindita | 15 | 18
10 | (Hong Kong) Tam CH | 21 | 21
(Malaysia) Soo TZ | 21 | 21
(Indonesia) R Zulkifli | 12 | 19
Q4 | (Singapore) R Susilo | 21 | 19 | 16
8 | (Indonesia) A Tedjono | 18 | 21 | 21

Second Round
Q2 | (Indonesia) FA Kholik | 21 | 21
10 | (Hong Kong) Tam CH | 17 | 14
(Malaysia) Soo TZ | 14 | 11
8 | (Indonesia) A Tedjono | 21 | 21

Third Round
Q2 | (Indonesia) FA Kholik | 21 | 18 | 21
8 | (Indonesia) A Tedjono | 18 | 21 | 10

==== Section 6 ====
First Round
PFQ | (Indonesia) F Wikajaya | 13 | 19
(Indonesia) T Mahbub | 21 | 21
Q5 | (Indonesia) A Saputra | 21 | 21
PFQ | (Indonesia) R Ismanto | 17 | 7
(Malaysia) Soong JV | 17 | 21 | 21
(Indonesia) Hermansyah | 21 | 9 | 9
(Indonesia) M Nizar | 6 | 7
4 | (India) A Pawar | 21 | 21

Second Round
(Indonesia) T Mahbub | 21 | 21
Q5 | (Indonesia) A Saputra | 15 | 13
(Malaysia) Soong JV | 19 | 15
4 | (India) A Pawar | 21 | 21

Third Round
(Indonesia) T Mahbub | 22 | 21
4 | (India) A Pawar | 20 | 19

==== Section 7 ====
First Round
(Indonesia) K Alexander | 15 | 19
(England) A Smith | 21 | 21
(Indonesia) A Susanto | 21 | 11 | 12
11 | (Malaysia) Zf Zulkiffli | 17 | 21 | 21
(Singapore) Huang C | 21 | 21
(Indonesia) J Arbitama | 8 | 15
(Indonesia) C Brians | 23 | 6 | 11
7 | (Malaysia) A Abdul Latif | 21 | 21 | 21

Second Round
(England) A Smith | 14 | 21 | 21
11 | (Malaysia) Zf Zulkiffli | 21 | 18 | 23
(Singapore) Huang C | 19 | 21 | 21
7 | (Malaysia) A Abdul Latif | 21 | 18 | 13

Third Round
11 | (Malaysia) Zf Zulkiffli | 21 | 21
(Singapore) Huang C | 15 | 14

==== Section 8 ====
First Round
(Indonesia) R Ivanudin | 21 | 19 | 21
Q3 | (Indonesia) I Atmaja | 18 | 21 | 6
(Indonesia) R Reyhaldi
13 | (Malaysia) Chan KB | wo
(Indonesia) A Dharma | 21 | 21
(Malaysia) Lim ZT | 11 | 12
Q8 | (Indonesia) W Triansyah | 10 | 12
2 | (Indonesia) S Kuncoro | 21 | 21

Second Round
(Indonesia) R Ivanudin | 21 | 17 | 21
(Indonesia) R Reyhaldi | 14 | 21 | 12
(Indonesia) A Dharma | 16 | 13
2 | (Indonesia) S Kuncoro | 21 | 21

Third Round
(Indonesia) R Ivanudin | 25 | 24
2 | (Indonesia) S Kuncoro | 23 | 22

== Women's singles ==
=== Seeds ===
1. (Malaysia) Tee Jing Yi (withdrew)
2. (Indonesia) Maria Febe Kusumastuti (semi-final)
3. (Indonesia) Adriyanti Firdasari (champion)
4. (Singapore) Chen Jiayuan (quarter-final)
5. (Indonesia) Aprilia Yuswandari (quarter-final)
6. (Russia) Olga Golovanova (first round)
7. (Malaysia) Yang Li Lian (withdrew)
8. (United States) Iris Wang (second round)

=== Finals ===
Semifinals
(Indonesia) Elyzabeth Purwaningtyas | 12 | 7
3 | (Indonesia) Adriyanti Firdasari | 21 | 21
(Indonesia) Ruselli Hartawan | 21 | 8 | 21
2 | (Indonesia) Maria Febe Kusumastuti | 15 | 21 | 16

Final
3 | (Indonesia) Adriyanti Firdasari | 21 | 21
(Indonesia) Ruselli Hartawan | 14 | 14

=== Top half ===
==== Section 1 ====
First Round
PFQ | (Indonesia) D Saraswati | 21 | 21
(Indonesia) L Josephine | 13 | 16
(Indonesia) M Salsabila | 21 | 21
Q2 | (Indonesia) R Aida | 19 | 15
6 | (Russia) O Golovanova | 21 | 15 | 9
(Indonesia) E Purwaningtyas | 12 | 21 | 21
(Indonesia) Y Asmarani | 12 | 23 | 14
(Malaysia) L Cheah | 21 | 21 | 21

Second Round
PFQ | (Indonesia) D Saraswati | 18 | 12
(Indonesia) M Salsabila | 21 | 21
(Indonesia) E Purwaningtyas | 21 | 21
(Malaysia) L Cheah | 18 | 9

Quarterfinals
(Indonesia) M Salsabila | 17 | 21 | 13
(Indonesia) E Purwaningtyas | 21 | 16 | 21

==== Section 2 ====
First Round
3 | (Indonesia) A Firdasari | 21 | 21
Q3 | (Indonesia) V Rumate | 15 | 18
Q1 | (Indonesia) B Sudrajat | 21 | 21
(Indonesia) D Indah Sari | 14 | 16
8 | (United States) I Wang | 19 | 21 | 21
(Indonesia) L Mainaky | 21 | 9 | 9
(Singapore) Liang XY | 21 | 21
(Indonesia) D Ayustine | 17 | 11

Second Round
3 | (Indonesia) A Firdasari | 21 | 21
Q1 | (Indonesia) B Sudrajat | 10 | 15
8 | (United States) I Wang | 19 | 21 | 16
(Singapore) Liang XY | 21 | 14 | 21

Quarterfinals
3 | (Indonesia) A Firdasari | 21 | 21
(Singapore) Liang XY | 12 | 12

=== Bottom half ===
==== Section 3 ====
First Round
PFQ | (Indonesia) G M Tunjung | 11 | 21 | 18
(Indonesia) R Hartawan | 21 | 4 | 21
(Indonesia) M Purnama | 20 | 11
PFQ | (Indonesia) Fitriani | 22 | 21
(Indonesia) G Rahmandhani | 21 | 11^{r}
(Russia) V Vorobeva | 17 | 8
(Indonesia) A Rovita | 18 | 10
4 | (Singapore) Chen JY | 21 | 21

Second Round
(Indonesia) R Hartawan | 21 | 15 | 21
PFQ | (Indonesia) Fitriani | 18 | 21 | 18
(Russia) V Vorobeva | 10 | 8
4 | (Singapore) Chen JY | 21 | 21

Quarterfinals
(Indonesia) R Hartawan | 21 | 16 | 21
4 | (Singapore) Chen JY | 14 | 21 | 19

==== Section 4 ====
First Round
PFQ | (Indonesia) M Lestari | 14 | 21 | 11
(Indonesia) T Ningrum | 21 | 8 | 21
(Thailand) P Chochuwong | 14 | 15
5 | (Indonesia) A Yuswandari | 21 | 21
Q4 | (Indonesia) J Sugiarto | 12 | 9
(Indonesia) R Riodingin | 21 | 21
(Indonesia) I Jayanti | 17 | 19
2 | (Indonesia) M Kusumastuti | 21 | 21

Second Round
(Indonesia) T Ningrum | 15 | 17
5 | (Indonesia) A Yuswandari | 21 | 21
(Indonesia) R Riodingin | 12 | 21 | 13
2 | (Indonesia) M Kusumastuti | 21 | 11 | 21

Quarterfinals
5 | (Indonesia) A Yuswandari | 17 | 18
2 | (Indonesia) M Kusumastuti | 21 | 21

== Men's doubles ==
=== Seeds ===
1. (Indonesia) Marcus Fernaldi Gideon / Markis Kido (champion)
2. (Indonesia) Berry Angriawan / Ricky Karanda Suwardi (quarter-final)
3. (Indonesia) Wahyu Nayaka / Ade Yusuf (semi-final)
4. (Russia) Nikita Khakimov / Vasily Kuznetsov (second round)
5. (Indonesia) Selvanus Geh / Kevin Sanjaya Sukamuljo (final)
6. (Indonesia) Andrei Adistia / Hendra Aprida Gunawan (first round)
7. (Indonesia) Ronald Alexander / Edi Subaktiar (second round)
8. (Chinese Taipei) Huang Po-jui / Lu Ching-yao (semi-final)

=== Finals ===
Semifinals
1 | (Indonesia) Marcus Fernaldi Gideon (Indonesia) Markis Kido | 21 | 21
3 | (Indonesia) Wahyu Nayaka (Indonesia) Ade Yusuf | 13 | 19
5 | (Indonesia) Selvanus Geh (Indonesia) Kevin Sanjaya Sukamuljo | 21 | 21
8 | (Chinese Taipei) Huang Po-jui (Chinese Taipei) Lu Ching-yao | 18 | 11

Final
1 | (Indonesia) Marcus Fernaldi Gideon (Indonesia) Markis Kido | 21 | 20 | 21
5 | (Indonesia) Selvanus Geh (Indonesia) Kevin Sanjaya Sukamuljo | 17 | 22 | 14

=== Top half ===
==== Section 1 ====
First Round
1 | (Indonesia) M F Gideon (Indonesia) M Kido | 21 | 21
(Indonesia) V Anindita (Indonesia) J Darmawandi | 18 | 15
(Malaysia) N Heg (Malaysia) Low JS | 22 | 18 | 13
(Indonesia) F Alfian (Indonesia) R Ardianto | 20 | 21 | 21
6 | (Indonesia) A Adistia (Indonesia) H Gunawan | 21 | 15 | 14
(Netherlands) R Bosch (Chinese Taipei) Tien T-c | 14 | 21 | 21
PFQ | (Indonesia) Hermansyah (Indonesia) E Kusuma | 21 | 21
(Malaysia) V Mawan (Malaysia) F Tazari | 13 | 16

Second Round
1 | (Indonesia) M F Gideon (Indonesia) M Kido | 21 | 21
(Indonesia) F Alfian (Indonesia) R Ardianto | 16 | 19
(Netherlands) R Bosch (Chinese Taipei) Tien T-c | 21 | 21
PFQ | (Indonesia) Hermansyah (Indonesia) E Kusuma | 10 | 10

Quarterfinals
1 | (Indonesia) M F Gideon (Indonesia) M Kido | 21 | 21
(Netherlands) R Bosch (Chinese Taipei) Tien T-c | 10 | 16

==== Section 2 ====
First Round
3 | (Indonesia) W Nayaka (Indonesia) A Yusuf | 21 | 18 | 22
(Thailand) K Kedren (Thailand) D Puavaranukroh | 19 | 21 | 20
(Indonesia) Hardianto (Indonesia) K Haryanto | 21 | 21
Q4 | (Indonesia) A Ramadiansyah (Indonesia) R Rivaldy | 15 | 12
7 | (Indonesia) R Alexander (Indonesia) E Subaktiar | 18 | 21 | 21
(India) Sanjeeth S. (India) J Yadav | 21 | 9 | 13
(Indonesia) F Kurniawan (Indonesia) A Putra | 22 | 21
Q3 | (Malaysia) Lee JY (Malaysia) Lim ZT | 20 | 17

Second Round
3 | (Indonesia) W Nayaka (Indonesia) A Yusuf | 20 | 21 | 21
(Indonesia) Hardianto (Indonesia) K Haryanto | 22 | 18 | 15
7 | (Indonesia) R Alexander (Indonesia) E Subaktiar | 21 | 15 | 23
(Indonesia) F Kurniawan (Indonesia) A Putra | 16 | 21 | 25

Quarterfinals
3 | (Indonesia) W Nayaka (Indonesia) A Yusuf | 22 | 11 | 21
(Indonesia) F Kurniawan (Indonesia) A Putra | 20 | 21 | 15

=== Bottom half ===
==== Section 3 ====
First Round
Q1 | (Indonesia) R Putra (Indonesia) G Ramadhan | 19 | 15
(Indonesia) A Cahyono (Indonesia) J Wiratama | 21 | 21
(Malaysia) Tan WG (Malaysia) Yew HK | 18 | 11
5 | (Indonesia) S Geh (Indonesia) K Sukamuljo | 21 | 21
(Indonesia) A Chandra (Indonesia) Y Dasuki | 19 | 13
(Malaysia) Chooi KM (Malaysia) Teo KS | 21 | 21
(Indonesia) C Rusdianto (Indonesia) T Wardhana | 15 | 19
4 | (Russia) N Khakimov (Russia) V Kuznetsov | 21 | 21

Second Round
(Indonesia) A Cahyono (Indonesia) J Wiratama | 17 | 17
5 | (Indonesia) S Geh (Indonesia) K Sukamuljo | 21 | 21
(Malaysia) Chooi KM (Malaysia) Teo KS | 21 | 21
4 | (Russia) N Khakimov (Russia) V Kuznetsov | 17 | 16

Quarterfinals
5 | (Indonesia) S Geh (Indonesia) K Sukamuljo | 21 | 21
(Malaysia) Chooi KM (Malaysia) Teo KS | 16 | 11

==== Section 4 ====
First Round
(Indonesia) A Sudrajat (Indonesia) T Supriadi | 13 | 21
Q2 | (Indonesia) Y Kumara (Indonesia) Y Saputra | 21 | 23
(Indonesia) Hantoro (Indonesia) R Swastedian | 15 | 19
8 | (Chinese Taipei) Huang P-j (Chinese Taipei) Lu C-y | 21 | 21
(Malaysia) J Singh (Malaysia) R Tan | 21 | 21
(Indonesia) A Aldiartama (Indonesia) M Ulinnuha | 14 | 19
(Indonesia) H Faisal (Indonesia) L Nugroho | 9 | 10
2 | (Indonesia) B Angriawan (Indonesia) R Suwardi | 21 | 21

Second Round
Q2 | (Indonesia) Y Kumara (Indonesia) Y Saputra | 13 | 10
8 | (Chinese Taipei) Huang P-j (Chinese Taipei) Lu C-y | 21 | 21
(Malaysia) J Singh (Malaysia) R Tan | 11 | 15
2 | (Indonesia) B Angriawan (Indonesia) R Suwardi | 21 | 21

Quarterfinals
8 | (Chinese Taipei) Huang P-j (Chinese Taipei) Lu C-y | 21 | 21
2 | (Indonesia) B Angriawan (Indonesia) R Suwardi | 19 | 11

== Women's doubles ==
=== Seeds ===
1. (Thailand) Jongkonphan Kittiharakul / Rawinda Prajongjai (semi-final)
2. (Russia) Olga Golovanova / Viktoriia Vorobeva (quarter-final)
3. (Indonesia) Shendy Puspa Irawati / Vita Marissa (champion)
4. (Indonesia) Keshya Nurvita Hanadia / Devi Tika Permatasari (final)

=== Finals ===
Semifinals
1 | (Thailand) Jongkonphan Kittiharakul (Thailand) Rawinda Prajongjai | 17 | 18
3 | (Indonesia) Shendy Puspa Irawati (Indonesia) Vita Marissa | 21 | 21
4 | (Indonesia) Keshya Nurvita Hanadia (Indonesia) Devi Tika Permatasari | 21 | 21
(Malaysia) Chow Mei Kuan (Malaysia) Lee Meng Yean | 19 | 13

Final
3 | (Indonesia) Shendy Puspa Irawati (Indonesia) Vita Marissa | 23 | 21
4 | (Indonesia) Keshya Nurvita Hanadia (Indonesia) Devi Tika Permatasari | 21 | 13

=== Top half ===
==== Section 1 ====
First Round
1 | (Thailand) J Kittiharakul (Thailand) R Prajongjai
BYE
(Indonesia) V Aprilsasi (Indonesia) M Jauhari
BYE
(Indonesia) M Islami (Indonesia) R Putri
BYE
(Indonesia) L Adriana (Indonesia) M Mainaky | 10 | 8
(Indonesia) U Khasanah (Indonesia) M Oktavianti | 21 | 21

Second Round
1 | (Thailand) J Kittiharakul (Thailand) R Prajongjai | 21 | 21
(Indonesia) V Aprilsasi (Indonesia) M Jauhari | 10 | 16
(Indonesia) M Islami (Indonesia) R Putri | 10 | 14
(Indonesia) U Khasanah (Indonesia) M Oktavianti | 21 | 21

Quarterfinals
1 | (Thailand) J Kittiharakul (Thailand) R Prajongjai | 21 | 21
(Indonesia) U Khasanah (Indonesia) M Oktavianti | 18 | 14

==== Section 2 ====
First Round
3 | (Indonesia) S Irawati (Indonesia) V Marissa
BYE
(Indonesia) D Fitriani (Indonesia) N Melati
BYE
(Indonesia) E Adriyana (Indonesia) A Budiharti
BYE
(Indonesia) M Giovani (Indonesia) R Putri Sari | 22 | 21
(Indonesia) D Haris (Indonesia) G Imawan | 20 | 18

Second Round
3 | (Indonesia) S Irawati (Indonesia) V Marissa | 29 | 21
(Indonesia) D Fitriani (Indonesia) N Melati | 27 | 17
(Indonesia) E Adriyana (Indonesia) A Budiharti | 10 | 16
(Indonesia) M Giovani (Indonesia) R Putri Sari | 21 | 21

Quarterfinals
3 | (Indonesia) S Irawati (Indonesia) V Marissa | 11 | 21 | 21
(Indonesia) M Giovani (Indonesia) R Putri Sari | 21 | 18 | 8

=== Bottom half ===
==== Section 3 ====
First Round
(Thailand) P Chochuwong (Thailand) C Teachavorasinskun | 11 | 18
(Indonesia) R Amelia (Indonesia) K Dewi | 21 | 21
BYE
(Indonesia) S Aulia (Indonesia) M Mahmudin
BYE
(Indonesia) A Rahayu (Indonesia) J Sugiarto
BYE
4 | (Indonesia) K Hanadia (Indonesia) D Permatasari

Second Round
(Indonesia) R Amelia (Indonesia) K Dewi | 24 | 21
(Indonesia) S Aulia (Indonesia) M Mahmudin | 22 | 14
(Indonesia) A Rahayu (Indonesia) J Sugiarto | 21 | 15
4 | (Indonesia) K Hanadia (Indonesia) D Permatasari | 23 | 21

Quarterfinals
(Indonesia) R Amelia (Indonesia) K Dewi | 21 | 12 | 11
4 | (Indonesia) K Hanadia (Indonesia) D Permatasari | 16 | 21 | 21

==== Section 4 ====
First Round
(Indonesia) A Awanda (Indonesia) G Widjaja | 19 | 26 | 14
(Malaysia) Chow MK (Malaysia) Lee MY | 21 | 24 | 21
BYE
(Indonesia) K Istirani (Indonesia) M Oklamona
BYE
(Indonesia) M Bandaso (Indonesia) F Parmenas
BYE
2 | (Russia) O Golovanova (Russia) V Vorobeva

Second Round
(Malaysia) Chow MK (Malaysia) Lee MY | 21 | 21
(Indonesia) K Istirani (Indonesia) M Oklamona | 15 | 19
(Indonesia) M Bandaso (Indonesia) F Parmenas | 12 | 13
2 | (Russia) O Golovanova (Russia) V Vorobeva | 21 | 21

Quarterfinals
(Malaysia) Chow MK (Malaysia) Lee MY | 21 | 21
2 | (Russia) O Golovanova (Russia) V Vorobeva | 13 | 4

== Mixed doubles ==
=== Seeds ===
1. (Indonesia) Riky Widianto / Richi Puspita Dili (champion)
2. (Indonesia) Muhammad Rijal / Vita Marissa (final)
3. (Indonesia) Irfan Fadhilah / Weni Anggraini (second round)
4. (Indonesia) Edi Subaktiar / Gloria Emanuelle Widjaja (semi-final)

=== Finals ===
Semifinals
1 | (Indonesia) Riky Widianto (Indonesia) Richi Puspita Dili | 21 | 21
(Indonesia) Afiat Yuris Wirawan (Indonesia) Komala Dewi | 10 | 17
4 | (Indonesia) Edi Subaktiar (Indonesia) Gloria Emanuelle Widjaja | 18 | 15
2 | (Indonesia) Muhammad Rijal (Indonesia) Vita Marissa | 21 | 21

Final
1 | (Indonesia) Riky Widianto (Indonesia) Richi Puspita Dili | 21 | 21
2 | (Indonesia) Muhammad Rijal (Indonesia) Vita Marissa | 18 | 19

=== Top half ===
==== Section 1 ====
First Round
1 | (Indonesia) R Widianto (Indonesia) R Dili
BYE
(Indonesia) A Putra (Indonesia) D Permatasari | 21 | 21
(Indonesia) A Cahyono (Indonesia) R Putri | 15 | 9
(Indonesia) Hardianto (Indonesia) D Haris | 21 | 21
(Indonesia) R Swastedian (Indonesia) K Istirani | 15 | 12
(Indonesia) F Kurniawan (Indonesia) S Irawati | 14 | 21 | 21
(Indonesia) Y Dasuki (Indonesia) V Aprilsasi | 21 | 9 | 13

Second Round
1 | (Indonesia) R Widianto (Indonesia) R Dili | 21 | 21
(Indonesia) A Putra (Indonesia) D Permatasari | 9 | 11
(Indonesia) Hardianto (Indonesia) D Haris | 15 | 25
(Indonesia) F Kurniawan (Indonesia) S Irawati | 21 | 27

Quarterfinals
1 | (Indonesia) R Widianto (Indonesia) R Dili | 18 | 22 | 21
(Indonesia) F Kurniawan (Indonesia) S Irawati | 21 | 20 | 16

==== Section 2 ====
First Round
3 | (Indonesia) I Fadhilah (Indonesia) W Anggraini | 21 | 21
(Indonesia) T Wardhana (Indonesia) M Jauhari | 11 | 14
(Malaysia) Ong JG (Malaysia) Lee MY | 21 | 21
(Indonesia) A Rivai (Indonesia) A Budiharti | 11 | 14
(Indonesia) A Wirawan (Indonesia) K Dewi | 21 | 21
(Indonesia) A Sudrajat (Indonesia) F Parmenas | 11 | 16
(Canada) H Wiebe (Canada) G Gao | 21 | 16 | 17
(Indonesia) R Nugroho (Indonesia) Z Ulfa | 15 | 21 | 21

Second Round
3 | (Indonesia) I Fadhilah (Indonesia) W Anggraini | 11 | 16
(Malaysia) Ong JG (Malaysia) Lee MY | 21 | 21
(Indonesia) A Wirawan (Indonesia) K Dewi | 21 | 21
(Indonesia) R Nugroho (Indonesia) Z Ulfa | 14 | 18

Quarterfinals
(Malaysia) Ong JG (Malaysia) Lee MY | 18 | 17
(Indonesia) A Wirawan (Indonesia) K Dewi | 21 | 21

=== Bottom half ===
==== Section 3 ====
First Round
(Malaysia) Wong FY (Malaysia) Chow MK | 17 | 12
(Indonesia) A Prasetya (Indonesia) A Saufika | 21 | 21
(Indonesia) K Sukamuljo (Indonesia) M Giovani
(Indonesia) R Sugiarto (Indonesia) R Amelia | wo
(Indonesia) J Wiratama (Indonesia) M Islami | 19 | 16
(Indonesia) R Alexander (Indonesia) M Oktavianti | 21 | 21
(Indonesia) R Ardianto (Indonesia) R Putri Sari | 11 | 10
4 | (Indonesia) E Subaktiar (Indonesia) G Widjaja | 21 | 21

Second Round
(Indonesia) A Prasetya (Indonesia) A Saufika | 21 | 21
(Indonesia) K Sukamuljo (Indonesia) M Giovani | 17 | 18
(Indonesia) R Alexander (Indonesia) M Oktavianti | 13 | 21 | 19
4 | (Indonesia) E Subaktiar (Indonesia) G Widjaja | 21 | 14 | 21

Quarterfinals
(Indonesia) A Prasetya (Indonesia) A Saufika | 16 | 21 | 18
4 | (Indonesia) E Subaktiar (Indonesia) G Widjaja | 21 | 16 | 21

==== Section 4 ====
First Round
(Indonesia) T Supriadi (Indonesia) M Bandaso | 10 | 11
(Malaysia) Tan AQ (Malaysia) Lai PJ | 21 | 21
(Indonesia) L Nugroho (Indonesia) M Mahmudin | 21 | 21
(Indonesia) R Kuncoro (Indonesia) M Lestari | 10 | 9
(Indonesia) P Sudrajat (Indonesia) A Rahayu | 18 | 17
(Indonesia) H Faisal (Indonesia) S Aulia | 21 | 21
(Indonesia) T Kusharjanto (Indonesia) K Hanadia | 11 | 11
2 | (Indonesia) M Rijal (Indonesia) V Marissa | 21 | 21

Second Round
(Malaysia) Tan AQ (Malaysia) Lai PJ | 18 | 21 | 22
(Indonesia) L Nugroho (Indonesia) M Mahmudin | 21 | 11 | 24
(Indonesia) H Faisal (Indonesia) S Aulia | 16 | 17
2 | (Indonesia) M Rijal (Indonesia) V Marissa | 21 | 21

Quarterfinals
(Indonesia) L Nugroho (Indonesia) M Mahmudin | 9 | 12
2 | (Indonesia) M Rijal (Indonesia) V Marissa | 21 | 21

| Preceded by 2014 Vietnam Open Grand Prix | BWF Grand Prix and Grand Prix Gold; Season 2014 | Succeeded by 2014 Dutch Open Grand Prix |
