= 2014 New Zealand Open Grand Prix =

2014 New Zealand Grand Prix
Tournament details
- Dates: 15 April 2014– 19 April 2014
- Total prize money: US$50,000
- Venue: North Shore Events Centre
- Location: Auckland, New Zealand

Champions
- Men's singles: (Chinese Taipei) Wang Tzu-wei
- Women's singles: (Japan) Nozomi Okuhara
- Men's doubles: (Indonesia) Selvanus Geh (Indonesia) Kevin Sanjaya Sukamuljo
- Women's doubles: (Australia) He Tian Tang (Australia) Renuga Veeran
- Mixed doubles: (Indonesia) Alfian Eko Prasetya (Indonesia) Annisa Saufika

The 2014 New Zealand Open Grand Prix officially SkyCity New Zealand Open 2014 was a badminton tournament which took place at the North Shore Events Centre, Auckland, New Zealand from 15 until 19 April 2014 and had a total purse of $50,000.

== Tournament ==
The 2014 New Zealand Open Grand Prix was the fifth grand prix badminton tournament of the 2014 BWF Grand Prix Gold and Grand Prix and also part of the New Zealand Open championships which has been held since 1927 in Whanganui. This tournament organised by the Match Point Event Ltd., with the sanctioned from the BWF. There are 240 players from 16 countries competed at this tournament. Players chased world ranking points, to qualifying for the Glasgow Commonwealth Games and World Championships. The tournament consisted of both men's and women's singles and doubles draws as well as a mixed doubles event.

=== Venue ===
This international tournament held at the North Shore Events Centre, Silverfield Lane, Wairau Valley, North Shore, Auckland.

=== Point distribution ===
Below is the tables with the point distribution for each phase of the tournament based on the BWF points system for the Grand Prix event.

Winner	Runner-up	3/4	5/8	9/16	17/32	33/64	65/128	129/256	257/512	513/1024
5,000	4,250	3,500	2,750	1,920	1,170	460	220	90	40	25

=== Prize money ===
The total prize money for this year tournament is US$50,000. Distribution of prize money will be in accordance with BWF regulations.

Event	Winner	Finals	Semifinals	Quarterfinals	Last 16
Singles	$3,750	$1,900	$725	$300	$175
Doubles	$3,950	$1,900	$700	$362.50	$187.50

== Men's singles ==
A former world No.1 and also London Olympics semifinalist Lee Hyun-il competed in this event as an unseeded player. He reach the third round after retired from the match to Tan Chun Seang with the score 21–14, 2–1. The top seed, Hsu Jen-hao reach the final match but was defeated by his compatriot Wang Tzu-wei who was seeded 4 with the straight games 21–9, 21–13.

=== Seeds ===
1. (Chinese Taipei) Hsu Jen-hao (finals)
2. (India) Sourabh Varma (third round)
3. (Malaysia) Tan Chun Seang (quarterfinals)
4. (Malaysia) Zulfadli Zulkiffli (champion)
5. (India) Arvind Bhat (semifinals)
6. (Chinese Taipei) Wang Tzu-wei (champion)
7. (Chinese Taipei) Wan Chia-hsin (quarterfinals)
8. (New Zealand) Joe Wu (third round)
9. (Malaysia) Mohamad Arif Abdul Latif (semifinals)
10. (Indonesia) Riyanto Subagja (third round)
11. (Chinese Taipei) Lin Yu-hsien (third round)
12. (Indonesia) Dharma Alrie Guna (first round)
13. (Malaysia) Yogendran Khrishnan (first round)
14. (Chinese Taipei) Shih Kuei-chun (quarterfinals)
15. (New Zealand) Michael Fowke (first round)
16. (Malaysia) Jiann Shiarng Chiang (quarterfinals)

=== Finals ===
Quarterfinals
1	(Chinese Taipei) Hsu Jen-hao	21	18	21
7	(Chinese Taipei) Wan Chia-hsin	19	21	13
3	(Malaysia) Tan Chun Seang	20	21	18
5	(India) Arvind Bhat	22	9	21
6	(Chinese Taipei) Wang Tzu-wei	21	21
16	(Malaysia) Jiann Shiarng Chiang	7	14
9	(Malaysia) Mohamad Arif Abdul Latif	21	21
14	(Chinese Taipei) Shih Kuei-chun	13	17

Semifinals
1	(Chinese Taipei) Hsu Jen-hao	21	21
5	(India) Arvind Bhat	14	9
6	(Chinese Taipei) Wang Tzu-wei	21	21
9	(Malaysia) Mohamad Arif Abdul Latif	14	18

Final
1	(Chinese Taipei) Hsu Jen-hao	9	13
6	(Chinese Taipei) Wang Tzu-wei	21	21

== Women's singles ==
The top seed in this event were Pai Hsiao-ma, Cheng Chi-ya of Chinese Taipei, Millicent Wiranto of Indonesia, and Michelle Chan Ky of New Zealand. The host representation Chan ended earlier in the second round. The top seed Pai fell in the quarter-finals. She was defeated by Nozomi Okuhara of Japan. In their previous 2 meetings, Okuhara has always been the unseeded while Pai always had a seed rank, however, Okuhara has reigned supreme both times. At the end of the women's singles event, Okuhara clinched the title and also making this victory as her first senior international title.

=== Seeds ===
1. (Chinese Taipei) Pai Hsiao-ma (quarterfinals)
2. (Chinese Taipei) Cheng Chi-ya (semifinals)
3. (Indonesia) Millicent Wiranto (quarterfinals)
4. (New Zealand) Michelle Chan Ky (second round)

=== Finals ===
Semifinals
(Japan) Nozomi Okuhara	21	21
(Japan) Ayumi Mine	13	12
(Japan) Kana Ito	21	21
2	(Chinese Taipei) Cheng Chi-ya	13	9

Final
(Japan) Nozomi Okuhara	21	21
(Japan) Kana Ito	15	3

== Men's doubles ==
A former men's doubles No.1 Koo Kien Keat compete at this event as the fifth seed partnered with Pakkawat Vilailak. The top seed pair Liang Jui-wei and Liao Kuan-hao fell in the quarterfinals, they were defeated by the 2012 World Junior Championships Takuto Inoue and Yuki Kaneko of Japan. The men's doubles title goes to Indonesian pair Kevin Sanjaya Sukamuljo and Selvanus Geh. The pair upsetting the number 2 seeded Chinese Taipei pairing Chen Hung-ling and Lu Chia-pin in a fierce 3 game battle.

=== Seeds ===
1. (Chinese Taipei) Liang Jui-wei / Liao Kuan-hao (quarterfinals)
2. (Chinese Taipei) Chen Hung-ling / Lu Chia-pin (finals)
3. (Malaysia) Gan Teik Chai / Ong Soon Hock (first round)
4. (Australia) Raymond Tam / Glenn Warfe (second round)
5. (Malaysia) Koo Kien Keat / (Thailand) Pakkawat Vilailak (second round)
6. (Australia) Robin Middleton / Ross Smith (quarterfinals)
7. (New Zealand) Kevin Dennerly-Minturn / Oliver Leydon-Davis (second round)
8. (Indonesia) Hardianto / Agripinna Prima Rahmanto Putra (semifinals)

=== Finals ===
Semifinals
(Japan) Takuto Inoue (Japan) Yuki Kaneko	21	17
(Indonesia) Selvanus Geh (Indonesia) Kevin Sanjaya Sukamuljo	23	21
8	(Indonesia) Hardianto (Indonesia) Agripinna Prima Rahmanto Putra	18	14
2	(Chinese Taipei) Chen Hung-ling (Chinese Taipei) Lu Chia-pin	21	21

Final
(Indonesia) Selvanus Geh (Indonesia) Kevin Sanjaya Sukamuljo	15	23	21
2	(Chinese Taipei) Chen Hung-ling (Chinese Taipei) Lu Chia-pin	21	21	11

== Women's doubles ==
The New Zealand third seeds Anna Rankin and Madeleine Stapleton were upset in the second round, losing to Chen Szu-yu and Cheng Chi-ya of Chinese Taipei in straight games. The top seed from Malaysia Ng Hui Ern and Ng Hui Lin were fall in the quarter-finals, they were lost to Japanese pair Yuki Fukushima and Sayaka Hirota in the rubber game. The fourth seeded from Australia won the women's doubles title after beat Shizuka Matsuo and Mami Naito in thrilling three game final.

=== Seeds ===
1. (Malaysia) Ng Hui Ern / Ng Hui Lin (quarterfinals)
2. (Australia) Jacqueline Guan / Gronya Somerville (quarterfinals)
3. (New Zealand) Anna Rankin / Madeleine Stapleton (second round)
4. (Australia) He Tian Tang / Renuga Veeran (champion)

=== Finals ===
Semifinals
(Japan) Yuki Fukushima (Japan) Sayaka Hirota	17	21	18
4	(Australia) He Tian Tang (Australia) Renuga Veeran	21	19	21
(Chinese Taipei) Chen Szu-yu (Chinese Taipei) Cheng Chi-ya	9	10
(Japan) Shizuka Matsuo (Japan) Mami Naito	21	21

Final
4	(Australia) He Tian Tang (Australia) Renuga Veeran	21	10	21
(Japan) Shizuka Matsuo (Japan) Mami Naito	13	21	18

== Mixed doubles ==
The top seeded Oliver and Susannah Leydon-Davis were defeated in the second round by the former world No.1 Koo Kien Keat who was partnered with Ng Hui Lin. The final match presented by all Indonesian pair. Alfian Eko Prasetya and Annisa Saufika emerged victorious in three close games over Edi Subaktiar and Melati Daeva Oktaviani, in a match with long rallies, great net play and plenty of power.

=== Seeds ===
1. (New Zealand) Oliver Leydon-Davis / Susannah Leydon-Davis (second round)
2. (Australia) Ross Smith / Renuga Veeran (second round)
3. (Australia) Raymond Tam / Gronya Somerville (first round)
4. (Australia) Matthew Chau / Jacqueline Guan (quarterfinals)
5. (Indonesia) Irfan Fadhilah / Gloria Emanuelle Widjaja (semifinals)
6. (Indonesia) Ronald Alexander / Weni Anggraini (withdrew)
7. (Japan) Takuto Inoue / Yuki Fukushima (second round)
8. (Malaysia) Muhammad Adib Haiqal Nurizwan / Sannatasah Saniru (first round)

=== Finals ===
Semifinals
5	(Indonesia) Irfan Fadhilah (Indonesia) Gloria Emanuelle Widjaja	21	13	15
(Indonesia) Alfian Eko Prasetya (Indonesia) Annisa Saufika	15	21	21
(Chinese Taipei) Huang Po-jui (Chinese Taipei) Shuai Pei-ling	7	13
(Indonesia) Edi Subaktiar (Indonesia) Melati Daeva Oktavianti	21	21

Final
(Indonesia) Alfian Eko Prasetya (Indonesia) Annisa Saufika	21	17	21
(Indonesia) Edi Subaktiar (Indonesia) Melati Daeva Oktavianti	18	21	12

Preceded by Malaysia Open Grand Prix Gold	BWF Grand Prix Gold and Grand Prix; 2014 BWF Season	Succeeded by 2014 China Masters Grand Prix Gold
