= Selvanus Geh =

Indonesian badminton player

Personal information
- Born: 27 November 1993 (age 32) Samarinda, East Kalimantan, Indonesia
- Height: 1.81 m (5 ft 11 in)
- Weight: 67 kg (148 lb)

Sport
- Country: Indonesia
- Sport: Badminton
- Handedness: Right

Men's doubles
- Highest ranking: 32 (with Kevin Sanjaya Sukamuljo 23 October 2014)
- BWF profile
Medal record
Men's badminton
Representing Indonesia
World Junior Championships
Bronze medal – third place	2011 Taipei	Boys' doubles
Asian Junior Championships
Bronze medal – third place	2011 Lucknow	Boys' doubles
Bronze medal – third place	2011 Lucknow	Mixed team

Selvanus Geh (born 27 November 1993) is an Indonesian badminton player specializes in doubles from Hi-Qua Wima Surabaya club. He won boys' doubles bronze medals at the 2011 Asian and World Junior Championships. Partnered with Kevin Sanjaya Sukamuljo, Geh won a Grand Prix title at the 2014 New Zealand Open.

== Achievements ==
=== BWF World Junior Championships ===
Boys' doubles
Year	Venue	Partner	Opponent	Score	Result
2011	Taoyuan Arena, Taoyuan City; Taipei, Taiwan	(Indonesia) Ronald Alexander	(Chinese Taipei) Huang Po-jui (Chinese Taipei) Lin Chia-yu	19–21, 23–21, 21–15	Bronze

=== Asian Junior Championships ===
Boys' doubles
Year	Venue	Partner	Opponent	Score	Result
2011	Babu Banarasi Das Indoor Stadium; Lucknow, India	(Indonesia) Ronald Alexander	(Chinese Taipei) Huang Chu-en (Chinese Taipei) Lu Ching-yao	17–21, 19–21	Bronze

=== BWF Grand Prix (1 title, 2 runners-up) ===
The BWF Grand Prix had two levels, the Grand Prix and Grand Prix Gold. It was a series of badminton tournaments sanctioned by the Badminton World Federation (BWF) and played between 2007 and 2017.

Men's doubles
Year	Tournament	Partner	Opponent	Score	Result
2013	Indonesia Grand Prix Gold	(Indonesia) Ronald Alexander	(Indonesia) Angga Pratama (Indonesia) Rian Agung Saputro	21–17, 15–21, 16–21	(silver) Runner-up
2014	New Zealand Open	(Indonesia) Kevin Sanjaya Sukamuljo	(Chinese Taipei) Chen Hung-ling (Chinese Taipei) Lu Chia-bin	15–21, 23–21, 21–11	(gold) Winner
2014	Indonesia Masters	(Indonesia) Kevin Sanjaya Sukamuljo	(Indonesia) Marcus Fernaldi Gideon (Indonesia) Markis Kido	17–21, 22–20, 14–21	(silver) Runner-up

BWF Grand Prix Gold tournament
BWF Grand Prix tournament

=== BWF International Challenge/Series (3 titles, 1 runner-up) ===
Men's doubles
Year	Tournament	Partner	Opponent	Score	Result
2013	Iran Fajr International	(Indonesia) Ronald Alexander	(Indonesia) Wahyu Nayaka (Indonesia) Ade Yusuf	19–21, 21–13, 20–22	(silver) Runner-up
2013	Malaysia International	(Indonesia) Alfian Eko Prasetya	(Malaysia) Chooi Kah Ming (Malaysia) Teo Ee Yi	21–15, 21–13	(gold) Winner
2014	Vietnam International	(Indonesia) Kevin Sanjaya Sukamuljo	(Australia) Robin Middleton (Australia) Ross Smith	21–14, 21–13	(gold) Winner
2014	Bulgarian International	(Indonesia) Kevin Sanjaya Sukamuljo	(Indonesia) Edi Subaktiar (Indonesia) Ronald Alexander	21–9, 21–13	(gold) Winner

BWF International Challenge tournament
BWF Future Series tournament
