= 2011 BWF World Junior Championships – boys' doubles =

2011 BWF World Junior Championships boys' doubles
Tournament details
- Dates: 2 – 6 November 2011
- Edition: 13th
- Level: International
- Venue: Taoyuan Arena
- Location: Taoyuan City, Taiwan

The boys' doubles event for the 2011 BWF World Junior Championships was held between 2 November and 6 November. Nelson Heg & Teo Ee Yi from Malaysia won gold medal.

== Seeded ==
1. (Chinese Taipei) Huang Po-jui / Lin Chia-yu (Final)
2. (France) Lucas Corvée / Joris Grosjean (quarter-final)
3. (Indonesia) Ronald Alexander / Selvanus Geh (semi-final)
4. (Malaysia) Nelson Heg / Teo Ee Yi (champion)
5. (Indonesia) Lukhi Apri Nugroho / Kevin Sanjaya Sukamuljo (quarter-final)
6. (Malaysia) Sant Enos Jani / Low Juan Shen (third round)
7. (Netherlands) Russell Muns / Robin Tabeling (third round)
8. (Thailand) Wannawat Ampunsuwan / Tinn Isriyanet (third round)

== Draw ==
=== Finals ===
Semifinals
1	(Chinese Taipei) Huang Po-jui (Chinese Taipei) Lin Chia-yu	21	21	21
3/4	(Indonesia) Ronald Alexander (Indonesia) Selvanus Geh	19	23	15
3/4	(Malaysia) Nelson Heg (Malaysia) Teo Ee Yi	21	21
(Chinese Taipei) Tien Tzu-chieh (Chinese Taipei) Wang Chi-lin	8	17

Final
1	(Chinese Taipei) Huang Po-jui (Chinese Taipei) Lin Chia-yu	17	17
3/4	(Malaysia) Nelson Heg (Malaysia) Teo Ee Yi	21	21

==== Section 1 ====
First round
(France) J Maio (France) G Mitteheisser	21	21
(Macau) Iek U-I (Macau) Lou H-M	17	6
(Russia) R Kargaev (Russia) A Sorokin	21	19	16
(Canada) A Lau (Canada) A Wilkinson	19	21	21
(Turkey) T Özsoy (Turkey) A Şenol	9	16
(India) H Thandarang (India) R Yadav	21	21
(South Korea) Jung J-W (South Korea) Kim D-J	13	17
(Japan) T Inoue (Japan) Y Kaneko	21	21

Second round
1	(Chinese Taipei) Huang P-J (Chinese Taipei) Lin C-Y	21	21
(France) J Maio (France) G Mitteheisser	18	19
(Denmark) M Christiansen (Denmark) D Daugaard	21	21
(Canada) A Lau (Canada) A Wilkinson	17	12
5/8	(Netherlands) R Muns (Netherlands) R Tabeling	21	21
(India) H Thandarang (India) R Yadav	13	14
(United States) A Susanto (United States) A Khor	2	12
(Japan) T Inoue (Japan) Y Kaneko	21	21

Third round
1	(Chinese Taipei) Huang P-J (Chinese Taipei) Lin C-Y	21	21
(Denmark) M Christiansen (Denmark) D Daugaard	13	18
5/8	(Netherlands) R Muns (Netherlands) R Tabeling	18	16
(Japan) T Inoue (Japan) Y Kaneko	21	21

Quarter Final
1	(Chinese Taipei) Huang P-J (Chinese Taipei) Lin C-Y	21	21
(Japan) T Inoue (Japan) Y Kaneko	15	18

==== Section 2 ====
First round
(Finland) H Aarnio (Finland) M Köngäs	16	9
(South Korea) Choi S-G (South Korea) Park S-W	21	21
(Singapore) Ngo YC (Singapore) G Ong	15	20
(Thailand) K Cholprasertsuk (Thailand) S Tovannakasem	21	22
(England) A Cheng (England) R Walker	18	15
(Vietnam) Le TT (Vietnam) Phạm CC	21	21
(Sweden) F Myhren (Sweden) C Nilsson	13	13
(Hong Kong) Lee CH (Hong Kong) Ng KL	21	21
(Germany) M Byerly (Germany) M Lamsfuß	21	21
(Lithuania) P Bartušis (Lithuania) A Plavin	16	13

Second round
3/4	(Indonesia) R Alexander (Indonesia) S Geh	25	21	21
(South Korea) Choi S-G (South Korea) Park S-W	27	17	19
(Philippines) C Cayanan (Philippines) T Co	8	19
(Thailand) K Cholprasertsuk (Thailand) S Tovannakasem	21	21
5/8	(Malaysia) S Jani (Malaysia) Low JS	21	21
(Vietnam) Le TT (Vietnam) Phạm CC	18	12
(Hong Kong) Lee CH (Hong Kong) Ng KL	21	21
(Germany) M Byerly (Germany) M Lamsfuß	11	19

Third round
3/4	(Indonesia) R Alexander (Indonesia) S Geh	21	21
(Thailand) K Cholprasertsuk (Thailand) S Tovannakasem	13	11
5/8	(Malaysia) S Jani (Malaysia) Low JS	15	16
(Hong Kong) Lee CH (Hong Kong) Ng KL	21	21

Quarter Final
3/4	(Indonesia) R Alexander (Indonesia) S Geh	21	17	21
(Hong Kong) Lee CH (Hong Kong) Ng KL	11	21	19

==== Section 3 ====
First round
(Macau) J Lo (Macau) Wong CC	10	12
(Netherlands) V de Vries (Netherlands) J Middleburg	21	21
(Russia) K Boyarskiy (Russia) S Sirant	15	21	17
(Finland) A Danskanen (Finland) O Larkimo	21	18	21
(Canada) N Choi (Canada) N Yakura	21	19	17
(Chinese Taipei) Wang C-L (Chinese Taipei) Wu H-L	19	21	21
(Japan) K Momota (Japan) T Saito	13	21	21
(Denmark) K Antonsen (Denmark) F Colberg	21	10	15
(Hong Kong) Chan TC (Hong Kong) Man TC	21	21
(Sri Lanka) P Ambegoda (Sri Lanka) P Hettiarachchi	15	13

Second round
(Netherlands) V de Vries (Netherlands) J Middleburg	21	12	21
(Finland) A Danskanen (Finland) O Larkimo	15	21	16
(Chinese Taipei) Wang C-L (Chinese Taipei) Wu H-L	6	11
5/8	(Indonesia) L Nugroho (Indonesia) K Sukamuljo	21	21
(Japan) K Momota (Japan) T Saito	21	21
(South Korea) Bae K-Y (South Korea) Jun B-C	16	10
(Hong Kong) Chan TC (Hong Kong) Man TC	16	6
3/4	(Malaysia) N Heg (Malaysia) Teo EY	21	21

Third round
(Netherlands) V de Vries (Netherlands) J Middleburg	15	17
5/8	(Indonesia) L Nugroho (Indonesia) K Sukamuljo	21	21
(Japan) K Momota (Japan) T Saito	21	20	19
3/4	(Malaysia) N Heg (Malaysia) Teo EY	15	22	21

Quarter Final
5/8	(Indonesia) L Nugroho (Indonesia) K Sukamuljo	17	19
3/4	(Malaysia) N Heg (Malaysia) Teo EY	21	21

==== Section 4 ====
First round
(Malaysia) C Ong (Malaysia) Tai AK	17	21
(Chinese Taipei) Tien T-C (Chinese Taipei) Wang C-l	21	21
(United States) P Chew (United States) J Kuo	21	21
(India) G Raju (India) S Sharma	14	19
(Indonesia) H Faizal (Indonesia) A Prasetya	21	21
(Singapore) A Chew (Singapore) A Ishak	15	11
(Egypt) Y El Fattah (Egypt) M Elsayad	10	10
(England) R McCarthy (England) T Wolfenden	21	21
(Germany) R Nils (Germany) K Schaefer	7	18
(Japan) A Koga (Japan) D Watanabe	21	21

Second round
(Chinese Taipei) Tien T-C (Chinese Taipei) Wang C-l	21	21
(United States) P Chew (United States) J Kuo	6	15
(Indonesia) H Faizal (Indonesia) A Prasetya	21	21
5/8	(Thailand) W Ampunsuwan (Thailand) T Isriyanet	17	16
(England) R McCarthy (England) T Wolfenden	21	21
(Australia) A Selladurai (Australia) T Wong	10	12
(Japan) A Koga (Japan) D Watanabe	17	21	18
2	(France) L Corvée (France) J Grosjean	21	17	21

Third round
(Chinese Taipei) Tien T-C (Chinese Taipei) Wang C-H	21	21
(Indonesia) H Faizal (Indonesia) A Prasetya	17	15
(England) R McCarthy (England) T Wolfenden	17	21	19
2	(France) L Corvée (France) J Grosjean	21	19	21

Quarter Final
(Chinese Taipei) Tien T-C (Chinese Taipei) Wang C-l	21	21
2	(France) L Corvée (France) J Grosjean	15	16
