= Wang Chi-lin =

Taiwanese badminton player (born 1995)

Wang Chi-lin 王齊麟
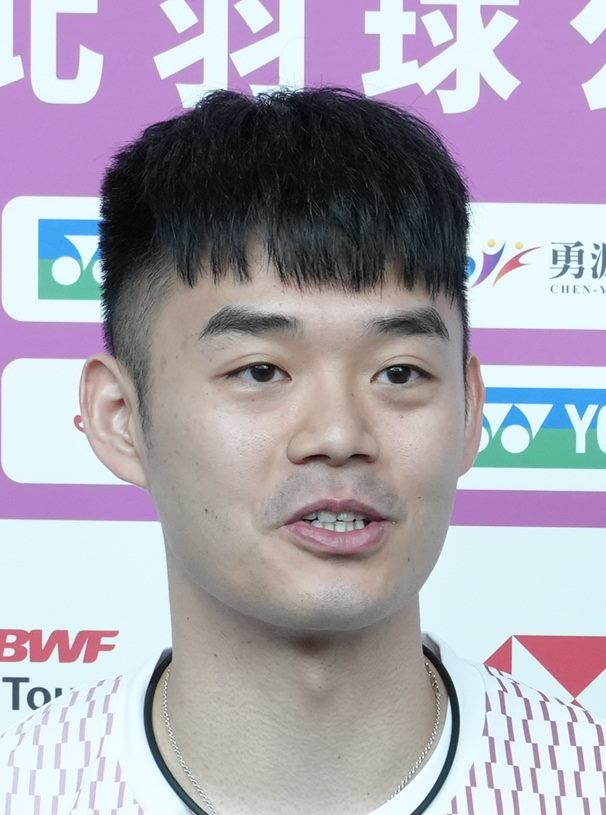
- Wang in 2026

Personal information
- Born: 18 January 1995 (age 31) Taipei, Taiwan
- Years active: 2009–present
- Height: 1.88 m (6 ft 2 in)

Sport
- Country: Republic of China (Taiwan)
- Sport: Badminton
- Handedness: Right

Men's & mixed doubles
- Highest ranking: 2 (MD with Lee Yang, 27 September 2022); 4 (MD with Chen Hung-ling, 25 October 2018); 10 (XD with Lee Chia-hsin, 21 June 2018)
- Current ranking: 20 (MD with Chiu Hsiang-chieh, 17 November 2026)
- BWF profile
Medal record
Men's badminton
Representing Chinese Taipei
Olympic Games
Gold medal – first place	2020 Tokyo	Men's doubles
Gold medal – first place	2024 Paris	Men's doubles
World Championships
Bronze medal – third place	2018 Nanjing	Men's doubles
Thomas Cup
Bronze medal – third place	2024 Chengdu	Men's team
Asian Games
Bronze medal – third place	2018 Jakarta–Palembang	Men's team
Bronze medal – third place	2022 Hangzhou	Men's doubles
Asian Championships
Bronze medal – third place	2023 Dubai	Men's doubles
Summer Universiade
Gold medal – first place	2017 Taipei	Mixed doubles
Gold medal – first place	2017 Taipei	Mixed team
World Junior Championships
Bronze medal – third place	2011 Taipei	Boys' doubles
Bronze medal – third place	2011 Taipei	Mixed team
Bronze medal – third place	2013 Bangkok	Boys' doubles
Asian Junior Championships
Silver medal – second place	2012 Gimcheon	Boys' doubles

Wang Chi-lin (Chinese: 王齊麟; pinyin: Wáng Qílín; born 18 January 1995) is a Taiwanese badminton player who specializes in doubles. He is the 2020 and 2024 Olympics men's doubles champion, becoming the first doubles pair in Olympics history to win consecutive gold medals, and the first unseeded men's double to win the Olympics gold medals. He also won the men's doubles bronze medals at the 2018 World Championships, 2022 Asian Games, and at the 2023 Asian Championships. He reached a career high as World number 2 in September 2022 with his former partner Lee Yang. Wang also competed in the mixed doubles, winning the gold medal at the 2017 Summer Universiade with Lee Chia-hsin, with their career high were number 10 in the BWF World Rankings in June 2018.

== Career ==
In 2018, Wang won the bronze medal at the 2018 World Championships with Chen Hung-ling. He then represented Chinese Taipei in the 2018 Asian Games, helping the team won the men's team bronze medal.

When his partner Chen Hung-ling retired from the international competition, Wang formed a new partnership with Lee Yang. Wang and Lee were classmates in junior high school. The duo reached six finals in the 2019 BWF World Tour, managing to win the Spain Masters, Orléans Masters, India Open, and Korea Masters. He also finished as the mixed doubles finalist in the Spain Masters with new partner Cheng Chi-ya.

In 2021, at the 2020 Tokyo Olympics, he and his partner Lee Yang defeated the 2018 World Champions' Li Junhui and Liu Yuchen in the men's doubles final. They became the first unseeded pair to win a gold medal in the Olympics' men's doubles badminton. This was Chinese Taipei's first Olympic medal in badminton. In 2022, Wang and Lee were named two of Taiwan's Ten Outstanding Young Persons by the Junior Chamber International Taiwan.

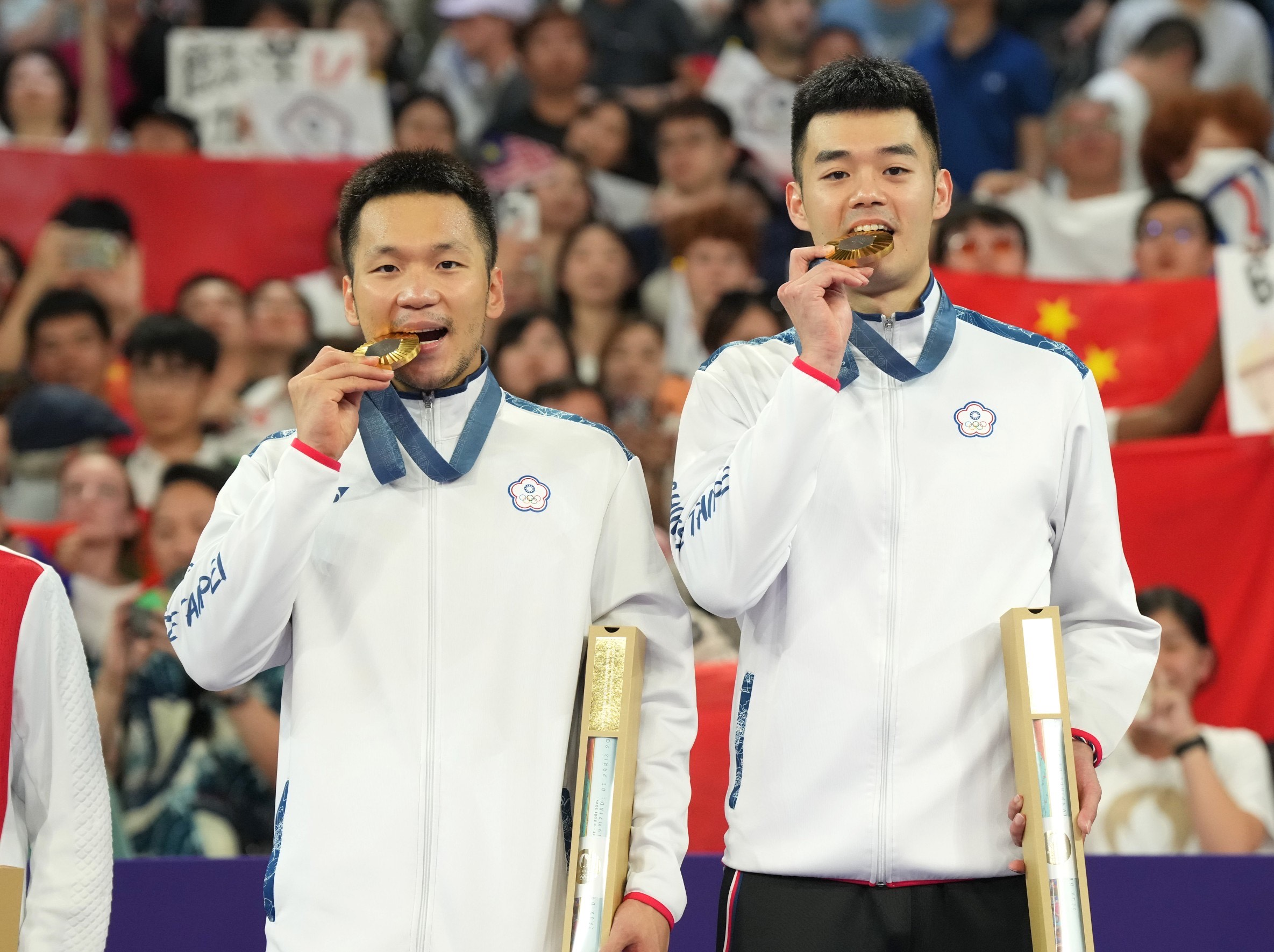
Wang (right) pictured with Lee Yang (left) during the 2024 Paris Olympics.

In 2024, at the 2024 Paris Olympics, he and his partner Lee Yang repeated the feat to win in the men's doubles finals as an unseeded pair, making history as the first men’s doubles pair to successfully defend their Olympic title.

After the retirement of his olympic partner Lee Yang, Wang formed a new partnership with Chiu Hsiang-chieh. In 2025, they won titles at the 2025 Taipei Open and 2025 Hylo Open, and the pair reached their highest ranking of 11.

== Achievements ==
=== Olympic Games ===
Men's doubles
Year	Venue	Partner	Opponent	Score	Result
2020	Musashino Forest Sport Plaza, Tokyo, Japan	(Chinese Taipei) Lee Yang	(China) Li Junhui (China) Liu Yuchen	21–18, 21–12	Gold
2024	Porte de La Chapelle Arena, Paris, France	(Chinese Taipei) Lee Yang	(China) Liang Weikeng (China) Wang Chang	21–17, 18–21, 21–19	Gold

=== World Championships ===
Men's doubles
Year	Venue	Partner	Opponent	Score	Result
2018	Nanjing Youth Olympic Sports Park; Nanjing, China	(Chinese Taipei) Chen Hung-ling	(Japan) Takeshi Kamura (Japan) Keigo Sonoda	17–21, 10–21	Bronze

=== Asian Games ===
Men's doubles
Year	Venue	Partner	Opponent	Score	Result
2022	Binjiang Gymnasium, Hangzhou, China	(Chinese Taipei) Lee Yang	(South Korea) Choi Sol-gyu (South Korea) Kim Won-ho	12–21, 10–21	Bronze

=== Summer Universiade ===
Mixed doubles
Year	Venue	Partner	Opponent	Score	Result
2017	Taipei Gymnasium; Taipei, Taiwan	(Chinese Taipei) Lee Chia-hsin	(Malaysia) Nur Mohd Azriyn Ayub (Malaysia) Goh Yea Ching	12–21, 21–16, 21–14	Gold

=== Asian Championships ===
Men's doubles
Year	Venue	Partner	Opponent	Score	Result
2023	Sheikh Rashid Bin Hamdan Indoor Hall; Dubai, United Arab Emirates	(Chinese Taipei) Lee Yang	(India) Satwiksairaj Rankireddy (India) Chirag Shetty	18–21, 14–13 retired	Bronze

=== World University Championships ===
Men's doubles
Year	Venue	Partner	Opponent	Score	Result
2014	Municipal Sport Palace Vista Alegre; Córdoba, Spain	(Chinese Taipei) Tseng Min-hao	(Malaysia) Mohamad Arif Abdul Latif (Malaysia) Iskandar Zulkarnain Zainuddin	21–8, 8–21, 16–21	Bronze

=== World Junior Championships ===
Boys' doubles
Year	Venue	Partner	Opponent	Score	Result
2011	Taoyuan Arena; Taoyuan City, Taipei, Taiwan	(Chinese Taipei) Tien Tzu-chieh	(Malaysia) Nelson Heg (Malaysia) Teo Ee Yi	8–21, 17–21	Bronze
2013	Indoor Stadium Huamark; Bangkok, Thailand	(Chinese Taipei) Tien Tzu-chieh	(China) Li Junhui (China) Liu Yuchen	10–21, 17–21	Bronze

=== Asian Junior Championships ===
Boys' doubles
Year	Venue	Partner	Opponent	Score	Result
2012	Gimcheon Indoor Stadium; Gimcheon, South Korea	(Chinese Taipei) Wu Hsiao-lin	(Indonesia) Arya Maulana Aldiartama (Indonesia) Edi Subaktiar	21–17, 20–22, 10–21	Silver

=== BWF World Tour (13 titles, 9 runners-up) ===
The BWF World Tour, which was announced on 19 March 2017 and implemented in 2018, is a series of elite badminton tournaments sanctioned by the Badminton World Federation (BWF). The BWF World Tour is divided into levels of World Tour Finals, Super 1000, Super 750, Super 500, Super 300, and the BWF Tour Super 100.

Men's doubles
Year	Tournament	Level	Partner	Opponent	Score	Result
2018	New Zealand Open	Super 300	(Chinese Taipei) Chen Hung-ling	(Indonesia) Berry Angriawan (Indonesia) Hardianto	21–17, 21–17	(gold) Winner
2018	Chinese Taipei Open	Super 300	(Chinese Taipei) Chen Hung-ling	(Chinese Taipei) Liao Min-chun (Chinese Taipei) Su Ching-heng	22–20, 21–9	(gold) Winner
2018	Korea Masters	Super 300	(Chinese Taipei) Po Li-wei	(South Korea) Choi Sol-gyu (South Korea) Seo Seung-jae	12–21, 21–17, 18–21	(silver) Runner-up
2019	Spain Masters	Super 300	(Chinese Taipei) Lee Yang	(South Korea) Kim Won-ho (South Korea) Seo Seung-jae	21–8, 23–21	(gold) Winner
2019	Swiss Open	Super 300	(Chinese Taipei) Lee Yang	(Indonesia) Fajar Alfian (Indonesia) Muhammad Rian Ardianto	19–21, 16–21	(silver) Runner-up
2019	Orléans Masters	Super 100	(Chinese Taipei) Lee Yang	(Japan) Akira Koga (Japan) Taichi Saito	16–21, 22–20, 21–15	(gold) Winner
2019	India Open	Super 500	(Chinese Taipei) Lee Yang	(Indonesia) Angga Pratama (Indonesia) Ricky Karanda Suwardi	21–14, 21–14	(gold) Winner
2019	U.S. Open	Super 300	(Chinese Taipei) Lee Yang	(South Korea) Ko Sung-hyun (South Korea) Shin Baek-cheol	13–21, 21–17, 3–6 retired	(silver) Runner-up
2019	Korea Masters	Super 300	(Chinese Taipei) Lee Yang	(Malaysia) Goh V Shem (Malaysia) Tan Wee Kiong	21–19, 20–22, 21–19	(gold) Winner
2020	Spain Masters	Super 300	(Chinese Taipei) Lee Yang	(Denmark) Kim Astrup (Denmark) Anders Skaarup Rasmussen	17–21, 19–21	(silver) Runner-up
2020 (I)	Thailand Open	Super 1000	(Chinese Taipei) Lee Yang	(Malaysia) Goh V Shem (Malaysia) Tan Wee Kiong	21–16, 21–23, 21–19	(gold) Winner
2020 (II)	Thailand Open	Super 1000	(Chinese Taipei) Lee Yang	(Malaysia) Aaron Chia (Malaysia) Soh Wooi Yik	21–13, 21–18	(gold) Winner
2020	BWF World Tour Finals	World Tour Finals	(Chinese Taipei) Lee Yang	(Indonesia) Mohammad Ahsan (Indonesia) Hendra Setiawan	21–17, 23–21	(gold) Winner
2022	Taipei Open	Super 300	(Chinese Taipei) Lee Yang	(Malaysia) Man Wei Chong (Malaysia) Tee Kai Wun	18–21, 21–10, 18–21	(silver) Runner-up
2023	Japan Open	Super 750	(Chinese Taipei) Lee Yang	(Japan) Takuro Hoki (Japan) Yugo Kobayashi	21–19, 21–13	(gold) Winner
2023	Hylo Open	Super 300	(Chinese Taipei) Lee Yang	(China) Liu Yuchen (China) Ou Xuanyi	22–24, 13–21	(silver) Runner-up
2023	Korea Masters	Super 300	(Chinese Taipei) Lee Yang	(Chinese Taipei) Lee Jhe-huei (Chinese Taipei) Yang Po-hsuan	17–21, 19–21	(silver) Runner-up
2025	Taipei Open	Super 300	(Chinese Taipei) Chiu Hsiang-chieh	(South Korea) Kang Min-hyuk (South Korea) Ki Dong-ju	21–18, 21–15	(gold) Winner
2025	Hylo Open	Super 500	(Chinese Taipei) Chiu Hsiang-chieh	(Indonesia) Sabar Karyaman Gutama (Indonesia) Muhammad Reza Pahlevi Isfahani	21–19, 21–18	(gold) Winner

Mixed doubles
Year	Tournament	Level	Partner	Opponent	Score	Result
2018	New Zealand Open	Super 300	(Chinese Taipei) Lee Chia-hsin	(South Korea) Seo Seung-jae (South Korea) Chae Yoo-jung	21–19, 14–21, 21–19	(gold) Winner
2019	Spain Masters	Super 300	(Chinese Taipei) Cheng Chi-ya	(South Korea) Seo Seung-jae (South Korea) Chae Yoo-jung	18–21, 15–21	(silver) Runner-up
2019	Macau Open	Super 300	(Chinese Taipei) Cheng Chi-ya	(Thailand) Dechapol Puavaranukroh (Thailand) Sapsiree Taerattanachai	11–21, 8–21	(silver) Runner-up

=== BWF Grand Prix (3 titles, 4 runners-up) ===
The BWF Grand Prix had two levels, the Grand Prix and Grand Prix Gold. It was a series of badminton tournaments sanctioned by the Badminton World Federation (BWF) and played between 2007 and 2017.

Men's doubles
Year	Tournament	Partner	Opponent	Score	Result
2015	Malaysia Masters	(Chinese Taipei) Chen Hung-ling	(Japan) Kenta Kazuno (Japan) Kazushi Yamada	19–21, 21–14, 17–21	(silver) Runner-up
2016	Chinese Taipei Open	(Chinese Taipei) Chen Hung-ling	(China) Li Junhui (China) Liu Yuchen	17–21, 21–17, 22–24	(silver) Runner-up
2016	Chinese Taipei Masters	(Chinese Taipei) Chen Hung-ling	(Indonesia) Fajar Alfian (Indonesia) Muhammad Rian Ardianto	6–11, 6–11, 13–11, 11–9, 10–12	(silver) Runner-up
2017	China Masters	(Chinese Taipei) Chen Hung-ling	(Japan) Takuto Inoue (Japan) Yuki Kaneko	21–14, 21–6	(gold) Winner
2017	Chinese Taipei Open	(Chinese Taipei) Chen Hung-ling	(Chinese Taipei) Lee Jhe-huei (Chinese Taipei) Lee Yang	21–16, 22–20	(gold) Winner
2017	New Zealand Open	(Chinese Taipei) Chen Hung-ling	(Malaysia) Ong Yew Sin (Malaysia) Teo Ee Yi	21–16, 21–18	(gold) Winner

Mixed doubles
Year	Tournament	Partner	Opponent	Score	Result
2017	Chinese Taipei Open	(Chinese Taipei) Lee Chia-hsin	(South Korea) Seo Seung-jae (South Korea) Kim Ha-na	20–22, 10–21	(silver) Runner-up

BWF Grand Prix Gold tournament
BWF Grand Prix tournament

=== BWF International Challenge/Series (4 titles, 4 runners-up) ===
Men's doubles
Year	Tournament	Partner	Opponent	Score	Result
2013	Maldives International	(Chinese Taipei) Tien Tzu-chieh	(Indonesia) Arya Maulana Aldiartama (Indonesia) Alfian Eko Prasetya	21–15, 21–17	(gold) Winner
2013	Singapore International	(Chinese Taipei) Chen Chung-jen	(Malaysia) Jagdish Singh (Malaysia) Roni Tan Wee Long	21–12, 25–27, 21–16	(gold) Winner
2013	Polish International	(Chinese Taipei) Chen Chung-jen	(Indonesia) Christopher Rusdianto (Indonesia) Trikusuma Wardhana	22–24, 21–14, 21–14	(gold) Winner
2013	Czech International	(Chinese Taipei) Chen Chung-jen	(Poland) Adam Cwalina (Poland) Przemysław Wacha	22–20, 20–22, 12–21	(silver) Runner-up
2013	India International	(Chinese Taipei) Tien Tzu-chieh	(India) Manu Attri (India) B. Sumeeth Reddy	16–21, 13–21	(silver) Runner-up

Mixed doubles
Year	Tournament	Partner	Opponent	Score	Result
2013	Singapore International	(Chinese Taipei) Chen Szu-yu	(Thailand) Vasin Nilyoke (Thailand) Chayanit Chaladchalam	14–21, 13–21	(silver) Runner-up
2013	Czech International	(Chinese Taipei) Wu Ti-jung	(Czech Republic) Jakub Bitman (Czech Republic) Alžběta Bášová	21–19, 21–13	(gold) Winner
2013	Malaysia International	(Chinese Taipei) Wu Ti-jung	(Indonesia) Alfian Eko Prasetya (Indonesia) Shendy Puspa Irawati	15–21, 16–21	(silver) Runner-up

BWF International Challenge tournament
BWF International Series tournament
BWF Future Series tournament
