= Ronald Alexander (badminton) =

Indonesian badminton player

Personal information
- Born: 15 August 1993 (age 33) Bitung, North Sulawesi, Indonesia
- Height: 1.80 m (5 ft 11 in)
- Weight: 62 kg (137 lb)

Sport
- Country: Indonesia
- Sport: Badminton
- Handedness: Right

Mixed doubles
- Highest ranking: 14 (with Melati Daeva Oktaviani, 26 January 2017)
- BWF profile
Medal record
Men's badminton
Representing Indonesia
World Junior Championships
Silver medal – second place	2011 Taipei	Mixed doubles
Bronze medal – third place	2011 Taipei	Boys' doubles
Asia Junior Championships
Bronze medal – third place	2011 Lucknow	Boys' doubles
Bronze medal – third place	2011 Lucknow	Mixed team

Ronald Alexander (born 15 August 1993) is an Indonesian badminton player specializes in doubles. He is joined the Jaya Raya Jakarta badminton club in 2008, and moved to Jaya Raya Suryanaga Surabaya in 2011.

== Achievements ==
=== BWF World Junior Championships ===
Boys' doubles
Year	Venue	Partner	Opponent	Score	Result
2011	Taoyuan Arena; Taoyuan City, Taipei, Chinese Taipei	(Indonesia) Selvanus Geh	(Chinese Taipei) Huang Po-jui (Chinese Taipei) Lin Chia-yu	19–21, 23–21, 21–15	Bronze

Mixed doubles
Year	Venue	Partner	Opponent	Score	Result
2011	Taoyuan Arena; Taoyuan City, Taipei, Chinese Taipei	(Indonesia) Tiara Rosalia Nuraidah	(Indonesia) Alfian Eko Prasetya (Indonesia) Gloria Emanuelle Widjaja	21–12, 17–21, 23–25	Silver

=== Asian Junior Championships ===
Boys' doubles
Year	Venue	Partner	Opponent	Score	Result
2011	Babu Banarasi Das Indoor Stadium; Lucknow, India	(Indonesia) Selvanus Geh	(Chinese Taipei) Huang Chu-en (Chinese Taipei) Lu Ching-yao	17–21, 19–21	Bronze

=== BWF World Tour (1 runner-up) ===
The BWF World Tour, which was announced on 19 March 2017 and implemented in 2018, is a series of elite badminton tournaments sanctioned by the Badminton World Federation (BWF). The BWF World Tours are divided into levels of World Tour Finals, Super 1000, Super 750, Super 500, Super 300 (part of the HSBC World Tour), and the BWF Tour Super 100.

Mixed doubles
Year	Tournament	Level	Partner	Opponent	Score	Result
2018	Lingshui China Masters	Super 100	(Indonesia) Annisa Saufika	(China) Guo Xinwa (China) Liu Xuanxuan	17–21, 21–7, 19–21	(silver) Runner-up

=== BWF Grand Prix (3 titles, 1 runner-up) ===
The BWF Grand Prix had two levels, the BWF Grand Prix and Grand Prix Gold. It was a series of badminton tournaments sanctioned by the Badminton World Federation (BWF) which was held from 2007 to 2017.

Men's doubles
Year	Tournament	Partner	Opponent	Score	Result
2013	Indonesia Grand Prix Gold	(Indonesia) Selvanus Geh	(Indonesia) Angga Pratama (Indonesia) Rian Agung Saputro	21–17, 15–21, 16–21	(silver) Runner-up

Mixed doubles
Year	Tournament	Partner	Opponent	Score	Result
2015	Chinese Taipei Masters	(Indonesia) Melati Daeva Oktavianti	(Chinese Taipei) Chang Ko-chi (Chinese Taipei) Chang Hsin-tien	21–18, 25–27, 21–15	(gold) Winner
2016	Indonesia Masters	(Indonesia) Melati Daeva Oktavianti	(Malaysia) Tan Kian Meng (Malaysia) Lai Pei Jing	21–16, 21–17	(gold) Winner
2017	New Zealand Open	(Indonesia) Annisa Saufika	(Australia) Sawan Serasinghe (Australia) Setyana Mapasa	21–19, 21–14	(gold) Winner

BWF Grand Prix Gold tournament
BWF Grand Prix tournament

=== BWF International Challenge/Series (1 title, 3 runners-up) ===
Men's doubles
Year	Tournament	Partner	Opponent	Score	Result
2013	Iran Fajr International	(Indonesia) Selvanus Geh	(Indonesia) Wahyu Nayaka (Indonesia) Ade Yusuf	19–21, 21–13, 20–22	(silver) Runner-up
2014	Bulgarian International	(Indonesia) Edi Subaktiar	(Indonesia) Selvanus Geh (Indonesia) Kevin Sanjaya Sukamuljo	9–21, 13–21	(silver) Runner-up

Mixed doubles
Year	Tournament	Partner	Opponent	Score	Result
2014	Indonesia International	(Indonesia) Melati Daeva Oktaviani	(Indonesia) Muhammad Rijal (Indonesia) Vita Marissa	7–11, 11–4, 11–6, 11–7	(gold) Winner
2015	Austrian Open	(Indonesia) Melati Daeva Oktaviani	(Indonesia) Edi Subaktiar (Indonesia) Gloria Emanuelle Widjaja	21–15, 20–22, 18–21	(silver) Runner-up

BWF International Challenge tournament
BWF Future Series tournament

== Performance timeline ==
=== National team ===
- Junior level

Team event	2011
Asian Junior Championships	Bronze

=== Individual competitions ===
- Junior level

Event	2011
Asian Junior Championships	Bronze (BD); R2 (XD)
World Junior Championships	Bronze (BD); Silver (XD)

- Senior level

Event	2016	2017	Ref
Asian Championships	R2	R1	

Event	2018	2019
World Championships	R2	R1

Tournament	2018	2019	Best
BWF World Tour
Thailand Masters	R2	R2	R2 (2017, 2018, 2019)
Malaysia Masters	A	R1	QF (2016)
Indonesian Masters	R1	R1	W (2016)
All England Open	A	R1	R1 (2016, 2017, 2019)
Swiss Open	A	R2	R2 (2019)
Lingshui China Masters	F	A	F (2018)
Malaysia Open	R2	R2	R2 (2016, 2018, 2019)
Singapore Open	R1	R2	R2 (2019)
New Zealand Open	QF	A	W (2017)
Australian Open	R1	A	R1 (2016, 2018)
Indonesia Open	R1	R1	R2 (2016)
Thailand Open	A	R1	QF (2017)
Chinese Taipei Open	SF	R1	SF (2015, 2018)
Korea Open	R1	A	R1 (2015, 2018)
Macau Open	QF	A	SF (2015)
Hong Kong Open	R2	A	R2 (2015, 2018)
Syed Modi International	QF	A	QF (2016, 2018)
Year-end Ranking	31	52	14
Tournament	2018	2019	Best

Tournament	2012	2013	2014	2015	2016	2017	Best
BWF Super Series
All England Open	A				R1	R1	R1 (2016, 2017)
Malaysia Open	A				R2	A	R2 (2016)
Singapore Open	A					R1	R1 (2017)
Indonesia Open	R2	A		R1	R2	R1	R2 (2012, 2016)
Australian Open	A				R1	A	R1 (2016)
Japan Open	A			R2	A		R2 (2015)
Korea Open	A			R1	A		R1 (2015)
Denmark Open	A				R1	A	R1 (2016)
French Open	A				R2	A	R2 (2016)
China Open	A	R1	A		R2	A	R2 (2016)
Hong Kong Open	A			R2	R1	A	R2 (2015)
Year-end Ranking	73 (MD)	61 (MD); 205 (XD)	114 (MD); 44 (XD)	21	14	77	14

Tournament	2012	2013	2014	2015	2016	2017	Best
BWF Grand Prix and Grand Prix Gold
Malaysia Masters	A	R2 (MD)	A	R1	QF	R2	QF (2016)
Syed Modi International	R1 (MD)	—N/a	A		QF	A	QF (2016)
Thailand Masters	—N/a				A	R2	R2 (2017)
German Open	A			QF	A		QF (2015)
Swiss Open	A				R1	R1	R1 (2016, 2017)
China Masters	SS		A	R2	A		R2 (2015)
New Zealand Open	—N/a	A	W/o	R2	A	W	W (2017)
Chinese Taipei Open	A	R1 (MD)	QF (XD)	SF	R2	A	SF (2015)
Vietnam Open	A		SF (MD); SF (XD)	R2	A	SF	SF (2014, 2017)
Thailand Open	A	R1 (MD)	—N/a	R1	A	QF	QF (2017)
Dutch Open	A		QF (MD); QF (XD)	A			QF (2014)
Chinese Taipei Masters	—N/a			W	A	—N/a	W (2015)
Korea Masters	A	R2 (XD)	A	R2	A		R2 (2013, 2015)
Macau Open	A		R1 (MD); R2 (XD)	SF	A		SF (2015)
Indonesian Masters	R2 (MD)	F (MD)	R2 (MD); R2 (XD)	R2	W	—N/a	W (2016)
Year-end Ranking	73 (MD)	61 (MD); 205 (XD)	114 (MD); 44 (XD)	21	14	77	14

== Record against selected opponents ==
Mixed doubles results with Melati Daeva Oktaviani against World Superseries finalists, World Superseries Finals semifinalists, World Championships semifinalists, and Olympic quarterfinalists.

- (China) Lu Kai & Huang Yaqiong 2–0
- (China) Xu Chen & Ma Jin 0–2
- (Denmark) Joachim Fischer Nielsen & Christinna Pedersen 0–1
- (Hong Kong) Reginald Lee Chun Hei & Chau Hoi Wah 1–1
- (Indonesia) Muhammad Rijal & Vita Marissa 1–1
- (Indonesia) Tontowi Ahmad & Liliyana Natsir 0–1
- (South Korea) Ko Sung-hyun & Kim Ha-na 0–2
