= Edi Subaktiar =

Indonesian badminton player (born 1994)

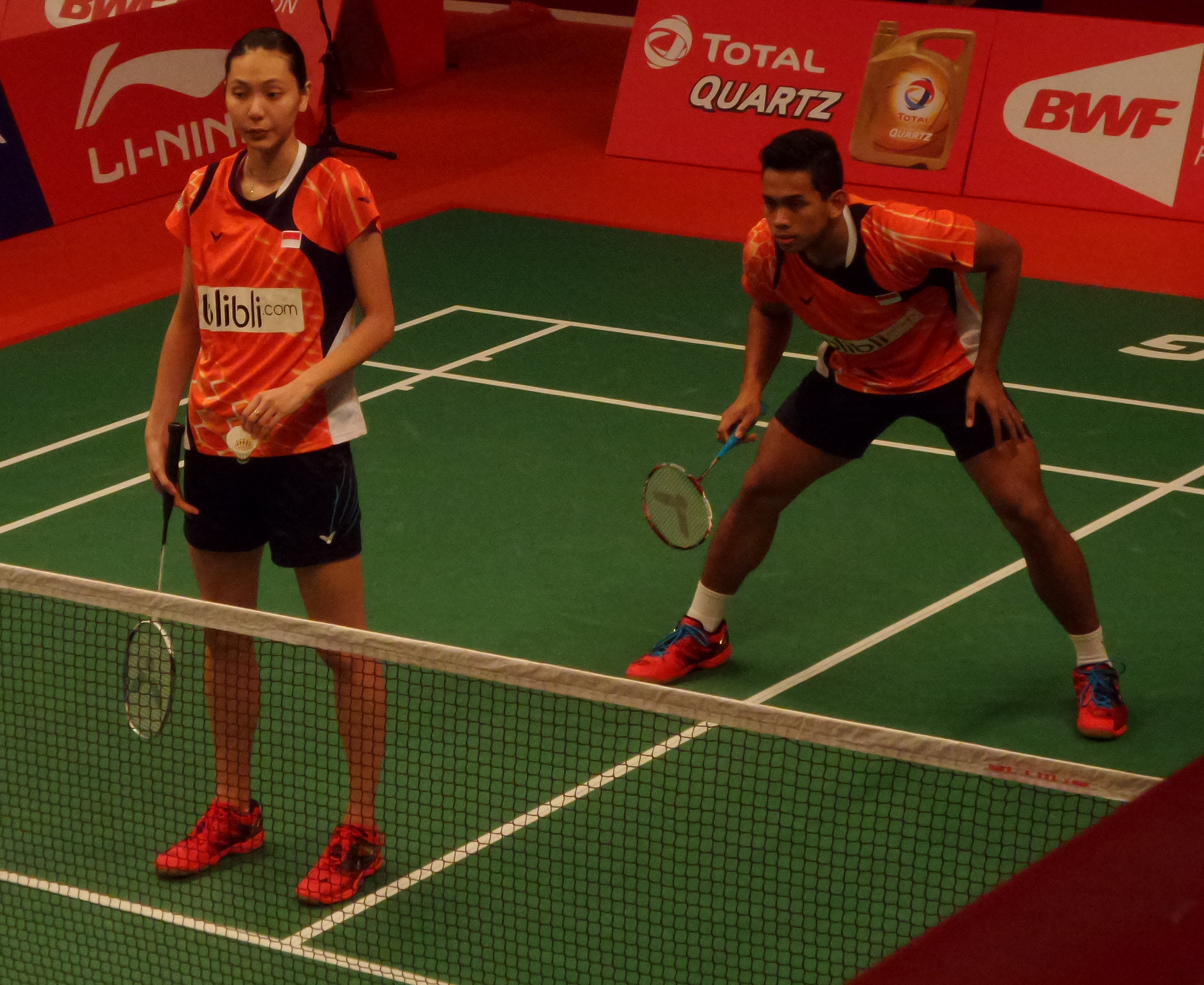
- Edi Subaktiar (right) in action with his partner, Gloria Emanuelle Widjaja

Personal information
- Born: 13 January 1994 (age 32) Sidoarjo, East Java, Indonesia
- Height: 1.73 m (5 ft 8 in)
- Weight: 73 kg (161 lb)

Sport
- Country: Indonesia
- Sport: Badminton
- Handedness: Right

Men's & mixed doubles
- Highest ranking: 12 (XD with G E Widjaja 18 June 2015)
- BWF profile
Medal record
Men's badminton
Representing Indonesia
SEA Games
Gold medal – first place	2017 Kuala Lumpur	Men's team
World Junior Championships
Gold medal – first place	2012 Chiba	Mixed doubles
Asian Junior Championships
Gold medal – first place	2012 Gimcheon	Boys' doubles

Edi Subaktiar (born 13 January 1994) is an Indonesian former badminton player specializing in doubles. He was the 2012 World Junior mixed doubles champion partnered with Melati Daeva Oktaviani. In the international competition, he was paired with Gloria Emanuelle Widjaja in mixed doubles and with Ronald Alexander in men's doubles. Since 2008, he joined PB. Djarum, a badminton club in Kudus, Central Java where his pair in mixed doubles Widjaja also joined. He retired in 2019 after a long injury which had prevented him to play again since it occurred at the 2017 SEA Games.

== Personal life ==
After leaving national training centre in 2019, Subaktiar was then assigned by Djarum club to become a coach in Champion club in Magelang.

== Achievements ==
=== BWF World Junior Championships ===
Mixed doubles
Year	Venue	Partner	Opponent	Score	Result
2012	Chiba Port Arena; Chiba, Japan	(Indonesia) Melati Daeva Oktavianti	(Indonesia) Alfian Eko Prasetya (Indonesia) Shella Devi Aulia	21–17, 21–13	Gold

=== Asian Junior Championships ===
Boys' doubles
Year	Venue	Partner	Opponent	Score	Result
2012	Gimcheon Indoor Stadium; Gimcheon, South Korea	(Indonesia) Arya Maulana Aldiartama	(Chinese Taipei) Wang Chi-lin (Chinese Taipei) Wu Hsiao-lin	17–21, 22–20, 21–10	Gold

=== BWF Grand Prix (1 title, 2 runners-up) ===
The BWF Grand Prix had two levels, the BWF Grand Prix and Grand Prix Gold. It was a series of badminton tournaments sanctioned by the Badminton World Federation (BWF) which was held from 2007 to 2017.

Mixed doubles
Year	Tournament	Partner	Opponent	Score	Result
2014	New Zealand Open	(Indonesia) Melati Daeva Oktavianti	(Indonesia) Alfian Eko Prasetya (Indonesia) Annisa Saufika	18–21, 21–17, 12–21	(silver) Runner-up
2014	Macau Open	(Indonesia) Gloria Emanuelle Widjaja	(Singapore) Danny Bawa Chrisnanta (Singapore) Vanessa Neo	21–15, 29–30, 22–20	(gold) Winner
2015	China Masters	(Indonesia) Gloria Emanuelle Widjaja	(China) Liu Cheng (China) Bao Yixin	21–18, 15–21, 24–26	(silver) Runner-up

BWF Grand Prix Gold tournament
BWF Grand Prix tournament

=== BWF International Challenge/Series ===
Men's doubles
Year	Tournament	Partner	Opponent	Score	Result
2012	Banuinvest International	(Indonesia) Arya Maulana Aldiartama	(France) Laurent Constantin (France) Sébastien Vincent	21–18, 20–22, 21–17	(silver) Runner-up
2014	Bulgarian International	(Indonesia) Ronald Alexander	(Indonesia) Selvanus Geh (Indonesia) Kevin Sanjaya Sukamuljo	9–21, 13–21	(silver) Runner-up

Mixed doubles
Year	Tournament	Partner	Opponent	Score	Result
2012	Banuinvest International	(Indonesia) Melati Daeva Oktavianti	(Austria) Roman Zirnwald (Austria) Elisabeth Baldauf	21–19, 21–18	(gold) Winner
2015	Austrian International	(Indonesia) Gloria Emanuelle Widjaja	(Indonesia) Ronald Alexander (Indonesia) Melati Daeva Oktaviani	15–21, 22–20, 21–18	(gold) Winner

BWF International Challenge tournament
BWF Future Series tournament

=== BWF Junior International ===
Boys' doubles
Year	Tournament	Partner	Opponent	Score	Result	Ref.
2011	Indonesia Junior International	(Indonesia) Arya Maulana Aldiartama	(South Korea) Kim Dong-joo (South Korea) Lee Hong-je	21–13, 20–22, 28–26	(gold) Winner	
2012	Malaysia Junior International	(Indonesia) Arya Maulana Aldiartama	(Indonesia) Hafiz Faizal (Indonesia) Putra Eka Rhoma	21–19, 21–12	(gold) Winner	

Mixed doubles
Year	Tournament	Partner	Opponent	Score	Result	Ref.
2012	Dutch Junior	(Indonesia) Melati Daeva Oktavianti	(Hong Kong) Tam Chun Hei (Hong Kong) Yuen Sin Ying	24–22, 23–21	(gold) Winner	
2012	Indonesia Junior International	(Indonesia) Melati Daeva Oktavianti	(Indonesia) Tedi Supriadi (Indonesia) Della Augustia Surya	18–21, 21–12, 21–11	(gold) Winner	

BWF Junior International Grand Prix tournament
BWF Junior International Challenge tournament
BWF Junior International Series tournament
BWF Junior Future Series tournament

== Performance timeline ==
=== National team ===
- Junior level

Team events	2012
World Junior Championships	4th
Asian Junior Championships	QF

- Senior level

Team events	2017
SEA Games	Gold
Asia Mixed Team Championships	QF

=== Individual competitions ===
- Junior level

Event	2012
Asian Junior Championships	Gold (BD)
World Junior Championships	Gold (XD)

- Senior level

Event	2013
Asian Championships	R1

Event	2015
World Championships	R3

Tournament	2013	2014	2015	2016	2017	Best
BWF Superseries
All England Open	A		R1	R2	A	R2 (2016)
India Open	A		SF	A	R2	SF (2015)
Malaysia Open	A		R2	A	R2	R2 (2015, 2017)
Singapore Open	A			R2	A	R2 (2016)
Australian Open	GPG	A	R2	A		R2 (2015)
Indonesia Open	Q2	Q1	R2	R1	R1	R2 (2015)
Japan Open	A		R1	A		R1 (2015)
Korea Open	A		R1	A		R1 (2015)
Denmark Open	A					A
French Open	A					A
China Open	R1	A				R1 (2013)
Hong Kong Open	R1	A	R2	A		R2 (2015)

Tournament	2010	2011	2012	2013	2014	2015	2016	2017	Best
BWF Grand Prix and Grand Prix Gold
Malaysia Masters			A	QF	SF	SF	A		SF (2014, 2015)
Thailand Masters	—N/a					R1	A		R1 (2016)
German Open			A		R1	R2			R2 (2015)
Swiss Open			A				R2	A	R2 (2016)
China Masters	SS				A	F	R1	R2	F (2015)
New Zealand Open			—N/a	A	F	A		QF	F (2014)
Chinese Taipei Open			A		R1	R1	A		R1 (2014, 2015)
Vietnam Open			A	w/d	A		QF	A	QF (2016)
Thailand Open			A	QF	—N/a	R1	R1	A	QF (2013)
Dutch Open			A	w/d	QF (MD); SF (XD)	A			SF (2014)
Chinese Taipei Masters	—N/a					A	R2	—N/a	R2 (2016)
Bitburger Open			A			R1	A		R1 (2015)
Korea Masters			A	QF	A				QF (2013)
Macau Open			A		R1 (WD); W (XD)	QF	R1	A	W (2014)
Indonesian Masters	R1 (MD); R1 (XD)	A	R1 (MD); R2 (XD)	SF	R2 (MD); SF	1R	SF	—N/a	SF (2013, 2014, 2016)

== Record against selected opponents ==
Mixed doubles results with Gloria Emanuelle Widjaja against Superseries Final finalists, World Championships semifinalists, and Olympic quarterfinalists.

- (China) Liu Cheng & Bao Yixin 0–2
- (China) Lu Kai & Huang Yaqiong 0–2
- (China) Wang Yilyu & Tang Yuanting 1–0
- (China) Zhang Nan & Zhao Yunlei 0–1
- (Chinese Taipei) Chen Hung-ling & Wu Ti-jung 0–1
- (Chinese Taipei) Tseng Min-hao & Cheng Wen-hsing 0–1
- (England) Chris Adcock & Gabby Adcock 1–1
- (Germany) Michael Fuchs & Birgit Michels 0–1
- (Hong Kong) Reginald Lee Chun Hei & Chau Hoi Wah 1–0
- (Indonesia) Muhammad Rijal & Vita Marissa 0–1
- (Indonesia) Riky Widianto & Richi Puspita Dili 0–1
- (South Korea) Ko Sung-hyun & Kim Ha-na 0–3
- (South Korea) Yoo Yeon-seong & Chang Ye-na 1–0
