= Tien Tzu-chieh =

Taiwanese badminton player (born 1995)

Tien Tzu-chieh 田子傑
Personal information
- Born: 19 January 1995 (age 31)

Sport
- Country: Republic of China (Taiwan)
- Sport: Badminton

Men's & mixed doubles
- Highest ranking: 49 (MD 27 August 2015); 194 (XD 17 April 2014)
- BWF profile
Medal record
Men's badminton
Representing Chinese Taipei
World Junior Championships
Bronze medal – third place	2011 Taipei	Boys' doubles
Bronze medal – third place	2011 Taipei	Mixed team
Bronze medal – third place	2013 Bangkok	Boys' doubles

Tien Tzu-chieh (Chinese: 田子傑; pinyin: Tián Zǐjié; Wade–Giles: Tien Tzu-chieh; born 19 January 1995) is a badminton player from Taiwan. He is a men's doubles and mixed doubles specialist.

== Achievements ==
=== BWF World Junior Championships ===
Boys' doubles
Year	Venue	Partner	Opponent	Score	Result
2011	Taoyuan Arena; Taoyuan City, Taipei, Chinese Taipei	(Chinese Taipei) Wang Chi-lin	(Malaysia) Nelson Wei Keat Heg (Malaysia) Teo Ee Yi	8–21, 17–21	Bronze
2013	Hua Mark Indoor Stadium; Bangkok, Thailand	(Chinese Taipei) Wang Chi-lin	(China) Li Junhui (China) Liu Yuchen	10–21, 17–21	Bronze

=== BWF International Challenge/Series ===
Men's doubles
Year	Tournament	Partner	Opponent	Score	Result
2013	Maldives International	(Chinese Taipei) Wang Chi-lin	(Indonesia) Arya Maulana Aldiartama (Indonesia) Alfian Eko Prasetya	21–15, 21–17	(gold) Winner
2013	India International	(Chinese Taipei) Wang Chi-lin	(India) Manu Attri (India) B. Sumeeth Reddy	16–21, 13–21	(silver) Runner-up
2014	Auckland International	(Netherlands) Ruud Bosch	(Chinese Taipei) Po Li-wei (Chinese Taipei) Yang Ming-tse	11–8, 11–5, 8–11, 9–11, 6–11	(silver) Runner-up
2015	Vietnam International	(Chinese Taipei) Lu Ching-yao	(Singapore) Terry Hee Yong Kai (Singapore) Hendra Wijaya	21–13, 14–21, 23–21	(gold) Winner

BWF International Challenge tournament
BWF International Series tournament
BWF Future Series tournament
