= 2011 Asian Junior Badminton Championships =

Tournament details
- Dates: 2-9 July 2011
- Edition: 14
- Venue: Babu Banarasi Das Indoor Stadium
- Location: Lucknow, India

The 2011 Asian Junior Badminton Championships is an Asia continental junior championships to crown the best U-19 badminton players across Asia. It was the 14th tournament of the Asian Junior Badminton Championships, and held in Lucknow, India from 2 – 9 July 2011.

== Tournament ==
The 2011 Asian Junior Badminton Championships organized by Badminton Asia Confederation. This tournament consists of mixed team competition, which was held from 2–5 July, as well as five individual events started from 5–9 July. Players from 19 countries participated in this competition.

=== Venue ===
- Babu Banarasi Das Indoor Stadium, at U.P. Badminton Academy, Gomti Nagar, Lucknow, India.

== Medalists ==
| Event | Gold | Silver | Bronze |
|---|---|---|---|
| Men's singles | (Malaysia) Zulfadli Zulkiffli | (India) Sameer Verma | (Japan) Kento Momota |
| Men's singles | (Malaysia) Zulfadli Zulkiffli | (India) Sameer Verma | (China) Liu Kai |
| Women's singles | (China) Sun Yu | (China) Shen Yaying | (India) P. V. Sindhu |
| Women's singles | (China) Sun Yu | (China) Shen Yaying | (China) Hui Xirui |
| Men's doubles | (Chinese Taipei) Lin Chia-yu and Huang Po-jui | (Chinese Taipei) Lu Ching-yao and Huang Chu-en | (Malaysia) Nelson Heg Wei Keat and Teo Ee Yi |
| Men's doubles | (Chinese Taipei) Lin Chia-yu and Huang Po-jui | (Chinese Taipei) Lu Ching-yao and Huang Chu-en | (Indonesia) Ronald Alexander and Selvanus Geh |
| Women's doubles | (Indonesia) Suci Rizki Andini and Tiara Rosalia Nuraidah | (Malaysia) Lee Meng Yean and Chow Mei Kuan | (Japan) Ayako Sakuramoto and Ayano Torii |
| Women's doubles | (Indonesia) Suci Rizki Andini and Tiara Rosalia Nuraidah | (Malaysia) Lee Meng Yean and Chow Mei Kuan | (China) Ou Dongni and Xiong Rui |
| Mixed doubles | (Indonesia) Lukhi Apri Nugroho and Ririn Amelia | (China) Pei Tianyi and Ou Dongni | (China) Chen Zhuofu and Xiong Rui |
| Mixed doubles | (Indonesia) Lukhi Apri Nugroho and Ririn Amelia | (China) Pei Tianyi and Ou Dongni | (Indonesia) Praveen Jordan and Tiara Rosalia Nuraidah |
| Mixed team | China; Chen Zhuofu; Guo Kai; Huang Yuxiang; Li Junhui; Liu Yuchen; Pei Tianyi; Xue Song; Zhuge Lukai; Huang Yaqiong; Hui Xirui; Ou Dongni; Sun Yu; Xiao Jia; Xiong Rui; Yu Xiaohan; Zheng Yu | Malaysia; Nur Mohd Azriyn Ayub; Goh Giap Chin; Nelson Heg; Low Juan Shen; Jagdish Singh; Soong Joo Ven; Teo Ee Yi; Zulfadli Zulkiffli; Soniia Cheah Su Ya; Cheah Yee See; Joyce Choong Wai Chi; Chow Mei Kuan; Shevon Jemie Lai; Lee Meng Yean; Lim Yin Fun; Yang Li Lian | India; B. Venkatesh; C. Rohit Yadav; T. Hema Nagendra Babu; Pratul Joshi; N. V. S. Vijetha; Shivam Sharma; Srikanth Kidambi; Sameer Verma; Gadde Ruthvika Shivani; Gauri Ghate; Daya Elsa Jacob; Tanvi Lad; K. Maneesha; P. V. Sindhu; Poorvisha S. Ram; Arathi Sara Sunil |
| Mixed team | China; Chen Zhuofu; Guo Kai; Huang Yuxiang; Li Junhui; Liu Yuchen; Pei Tianyi; Xue Song; Zhuge Lukai; Huang Yaqiong; Hui Xirui; Ou Dongni; Sun Yu; Xiao Jia; Xiong Rui; Yu Xiaohan; Zheng Yu | Malaysia; Nur Mohd Azriyn Ayub; Goh Giap Chin; Nelson Heg; Low Juan Shen; Jagdish Singh; Soong Joo Ven; Teo Ee Yi; Zulfadli Zulkiffli; Soniia Cheah Su Ya; Cheah Yee See; Joyce Choong Wai Chi; Chow Mei Kuan; Shevon Jemie Lai; Lee Meng Yean; Lim Yin Fun; Yang Li Lian | Indonesia; Ronald Alexander; Selvanus Geh; Praveen Jordan; Lukhi Apri Nugroho; Shesar Hiren Rhustavito; Rangga Yave Rianto; Panji Akbar Sudrajat; Rizky Susanto; Ririn Amelia; Suci Rizky Andini; Tiara Rosalia Nuraidah; Melati Daeva Oktavianti; Elyzabeth Purwaningtyas; Khaeriah Rosmini; Yulia Yosephine Susanto; Gloria Emanuelle Widjaja |

== Medal count ==
| Pos | Country | Gold | Silver | Bronze | Total |
|---|---|---|---|---|---|
| 1 | China | 2 | 2 | 4 | 8 |
| 2 | Indonesia | 2 | 0 | 3 | 5 |
| 3 | Malaysia | 1 | 2 | 1 | 4 |
| 4 | Chinese Taipei | 1 | 1 | 0 | 2 |
| 5 | India | 0 | 1 | 2 | 3 |
| 6 | Japan | 0 | 0 | 2 | 2 |
