= Tiara Rosalia Nuraidah =

Indonesian badminton player (born 1993)

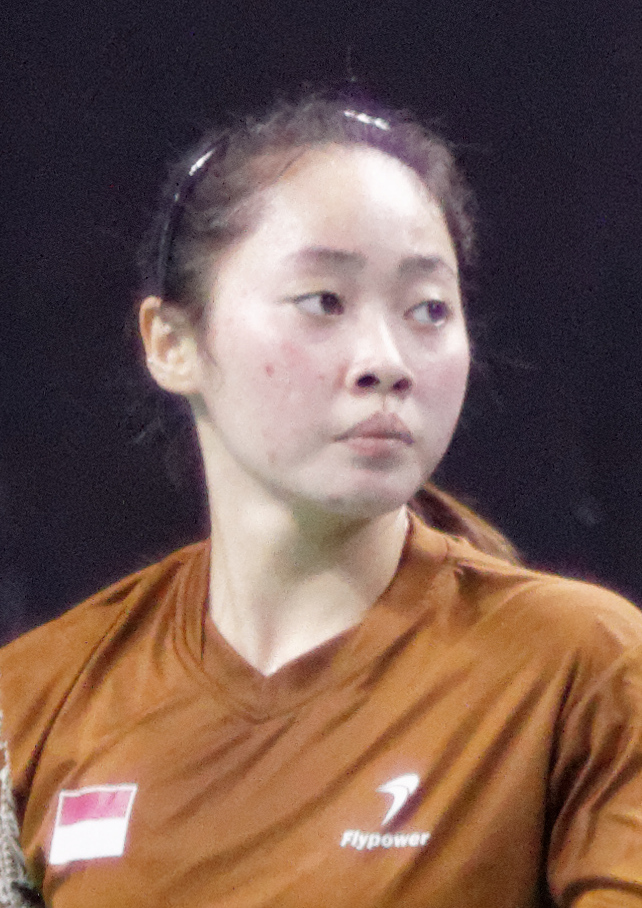
- Tiara Rosalia Nuraidah at the 2013 French Open Superseries

Personal information
- Born: 27 June 1993 (age 33) Garut, West Java, Indonesia
- Height: 1.65 m (5 ft 5 in)
- Weight: 63 kg (139 lb)

Sport
- Country: Indonesia
- Sport: Badminton
- Handedness: Right

Women's & mixed doubles
- Highest ranking: 15 (WD with Gebby Ristiyani Imawan, 26 September 2013)
- BWF profile
Medal record
Women's badminton
Representing Indonesia
Asian Championships
Bronze medal – third place	2013 Taipei	Women's doubles
World Junior Championships
Silver medal – second place	2009 Alor Setar	Girls' doubles
Silver medal – second place	2011 Taipei	Mixed doubles
Bronze medal – third place	2011 Taipei	Girls' doubles
Asian Junior Championships
Gold medal – first place	2011 Lucknow	Girls' doubles
Bronze medal – third place	2010 Kuala Lumpur	Mixed team
Bronze medal – third place	2011 Lucknow	Mixed doubles
Bronze medal – third place	2011 Lucknow	Mixed team

Tiara Rosalia Nuraidah (born 27 June 1993) is an Indonesian badminton player. She was the girls' doubles gold medalist at the 2011 Asian Junior Championships. She also won the women's doubles title at the Indonesia International Challenge back to back in 2014 and 2015 with different partners.

== Achievements ==
=== Asian Championships ===
Women's doubles
Year	Venue	Partner	Opponent	Score	Result
2013	Taipei Arena; Taipei, Taiwan	(Indonesia) Gebby Ristiyani Imawan	(China) Ma Jin (China) Tang Jinhua	18–21, 8–21	Bronze

=== BWF World Junior Championships ===
Girls' doubles
Year	Venue	Partner	Opponent	Score	Result
2009	Sultan Abdul Halim Stadium; Alor Setar, Malaysia	(Indonesia) Suci Rizky Andini	(China) Tang Jinhua (China) Xia Huan	9–21, 18–21	Silver
2011	Taoyuan Arena; Taoyuan City, Taipei, Taiwan	(Indonesia) Suci Rizky Andini	(South Korea) Lee So-hee (South Korea) Shin Seung-chan	23–21, 20–22, 5–21	Bronze

Mixed doubles
Year	Venue	Partner	Opponent	Score	Result
2011	Taoyuan Arena; Taoyuan City, Taipei, Taiwan	(Indonesia) Ronald Alexander	(Indonesia) Alfian Eko Prasetya (Indonesia) Gloria Emanuelle Widjaja	21–12, 17–21, 23–25	Silver

=== Asian Junior Championships ===
Girls' doubles
Year	Venue	Partner	Opponent	Score	Result
2011	Babu Banarasi Das Indoor Stadium; Lucknow, India	(Indonesia) Suci Rizky Andini	(Malaysia) Chow Mei Kuan (Malaysia) Lee Meng Yean	21–18, 16–21, 21–12	Gold

Mixed doubles
Year	Venue	Partner	Opponent	Score	Result
2011	Babu Banarasi Das Indoor Stadium; Lucknow, India	(Indonesia) Praveen Jordan	(China) Pei Tianyi (China) Ou Dongni	14–21, 21–23	Bronze

=== BWF Grand Prix (1 runner-up) ===
The BWF Grand Prix had two levels, the Grand Prix and Grand Prix Gold. It was a series of badminton tournaments sanctioned by the Badminton World Federation (BWF) and played between 2007 and 2017.

Women's doubles
Year	Tournament	Partner	Opponent	Score	Result
2016	Vietnam Open	(Indonesia) Rizki Amelia Pradipta	(Indonesia) Della Destiara Haris (Indonesia) Rosyita Eka Putri Sari	11–21, 15–21	(silver) Runner-up

BWF Grand Prix Gold tournament
BWF Grand Prix tournament

=== BWF International Challenge/Series (5 titles, 3 runners-up) ===
Women's doubles
Year	Tournament	Partner	Opponent	Score	Result
2010	Malaysia International	(Indonesia) Gebby Ristiyani Imawan	(Malaysia) Chin Eei Hui (Malaysia) Lai Pei Jing	5–21, 10–21	(silver) Runner-up
2011	India International	(Indonesia) Gebby Ristiyani Imawan	(Indonesia) Suci Rizky Andini (Indonesia) Della Destiara Haris	21–23, 13–21	(silver) Runner-up
2014	Indonesia International	(Indonesia) Suci Rizky Andini	(Indonesia) Shendy Puspa Irawati (Indonesia) Vita Marissa	11–6, 11–9, 11–6	(gold) Winner
2015	Indonesia International	(Indonesia) Gebby Ristiyani Imawan	(Indonesia) Anggia Shitta Awanda (Indonesia) Ni Ketut Mahadewi Istarani	21–13, 21–11	(gold) Winner
2015	Indonesia International	(Indonesia) Gebby Ristiyani Imawan	(Indonesia) Suci Rizky Andini (Indonesia) Maretha Dea Giovani	21–17, 21–14	(gold) Winner
2015	Vietnam International	(Indonesia) Gebby Ristiyani Imawan	(Indonesia) Nisak Puji Lestari (Indonesia) Meirisa Cindy Sahputri	21–8, 19–21, 21–15	(gold) Winner
2017	Indonesia International	(Indonesia) Febriana Dwipuji Kusuma	(Indonesia) Agatha Imanuela (Indonesia) Siti Fadia Silva Ramadhanti	21–19, 21–18	(gold) Winner

Mixed doubles
Year	Tournament	Partner	Opponent	Score	Result
2019	Indonesia International	(Indonesia) Rian Agung Saputro	(Indonesia) Zachariah Josiahno Sumanti (Indonesia) Hediana Julimarbela	20–22, 14–21	(silver) Runner-up

BWF International Challenge tournament
BWF International Series tournament

=== Invitational tournament ===
Women's doubles
Year	Tournament	Partner	Opponent	Score	Result
2014	Copenhagen Masters	(Indonesia) Suci Rizky Andini	(Denmark) Christinna Pedersen (Denmark) Kamilla Rytter Juhl	18–21, 16–21	(silver) Runner-up

== Performance timeline ==
Key

W	Won	F	Finalist	SF	Semi-finalist
QF	Quarter-finalist	#R	Rounds 4, 3, 2, 1	RR	Round-robin stage
Q#	Qualification round	A	Absent	w/d	Withdrew
G	Gold	S	Silver	B	Bronze
NH	Not held	N/A	Not applicable	DNQ	Did not qualify

=== National team ===
- Junior level

Team events	2009	2010	2011
Asian Junior Championships	QF	B	B
World Junior Championships	5th	A	7th

- Senior level

Team events	2014	2015	2016	2017
Asia Mixed Team Championships	NH			QF
Asian Games	QF	NH		

=== Individual competitions ===
- Junior level

Events	2009	2010	2011
Asian Junior Championships	3R (GD); QF (XD)	3R (GD); 3R (XD)	G (GD); B (XD)
World Junior Championships	S (GD); 3R (XD)	A	B (GD); S (XD)

- Senior level

Events	2013	2014
Southeast Asian Games	QF	NH
Asian Championships	B	A
Asian Games	NH	2R
World Championships	2R	2R

Tournament	BWF World Tour		Best
Tournament	2018	2019	Best
Thailand Masters	A	1R (XD)	QF (2017)
Indonesia Masters	1R	A	SF (2016)
Indonesia Open	1R	2R (WD)	QF (2016)
Indonesia Masters Super 100	1R (WD); 2R (XD)	2R (WD); 2R (XD)	2R (2018, 2019)

Tournament	BWF Superseries								Best
Tournament	2010	2011	2012	2013	2014	2015	2016	2017	Best
Indonesia Open	1R	1R	2R	2R	1R	A	QF	1R	QF (2016)

Tournament	BWF Grand Prix and Grand Prix Gold								Best
Tournament	2010	2011	2012	2013	2014	2015	2016	2017	Best
Thailand Masters	NH						2R	QF	QF (2017)
Vietnam Open	2R (WD); 1R (XD)	2R	2R	A		QF	F	2R	F (2016)
Indonesia Masters	QF (WD); 1R (XD)	1R	2R	2R	A	2R	SF	NH	SF (2016)
