= Nelson Heg =

Malaysian badminton player (born 1993)

Nelson Heg Wei Keat 方威捷
Personal information
- Born: 6 January 1993 (age 33) Butterworth, Penang, Malaysia

Sport
- Country: Malaysia
- Sport: Badminton

Men's & mixed doubles
- Highest ranking: 37 (MD 11 April 2013); 179 (XD 19 April 2012)
- BWF profile
Medal record
Men's badminton
Representing Malaysia
World Junior Championships
Gold medal – first place	2011 Taipei	Boys' doubles
Gold medal – first place	2011 Taipei	Mixed team
Silver medal – second place	2010 Guadalajara	Boys' doubles
Bronze medal – third place	2010 Guadalajara	Mixed team
Bronze medal – third place	2011 Taipei	Mixed doubles
Commonwealth Youth Games
Gold medal – first place	2011 Douglas	Boys' doubles
Bronze medal – third place	2011 Douglas	Mixed doubles
Asian Junior Championships
Silver medal – second place	2010 Kuala Lumpur	Mixed team
Silver medal – second place	2011 Lucknow	Mixed team
Bronze medal – third place	2010 Kuala Lumpur	Boys' doubles
Bronze medal – third place	2011 Lucknow	Boys' doubles

Nelson Heg
- Spouse: Boey Yeok Ling

Chinese name
- Traditional Chinese: 方威捷
- Simplified Chinese: 方威捷
- Hanyu Pinyin: Fāng Wēi Jié
- Jyutping: Fong1 Wai1 Zit6
- Hokkien POJ: Png Ui-chia̍t
- Tâi-lô: Png Ui-tsia̍t

Nelson Heg Wei Keat (born 6 January 1993) is a Malaysian badminton player. He won gold medals at the 2011 World Junior Championships in the team and boys' doubles events.

== Achievements ==
=== World Junior Championships ===
Boys' doubles
Year	Venue	Partner	Opponent	Score	Result
2010	Domo del Code Jalisco, Guadalajara, Mexico	(Malaysia) Teo Ee Yi	(Malaysia) Ow Yao Han (Malaysia) Yew Hong Kheng	18–21, 15–21	Silver
2011	Taoyuan Arena, Taoyuan City, Taipei, Taiwan	(Malaysia) Teo Ee Yi	(Chinese Taipei) Huang Po-jui (Chinese Taipei) Lin Chia-yu	21–17, 21–17	Gold

Mixed doubles
Year	Venue	Partner	Opponent	Score	Result
2011	Taoyuan Arena, Taoyuan City, Taipei, Taiwan	(Malaysia) Chow Mei Kuan	(Indonesia) Ronald Alexander (Indonesia) Tiara Rosalia Nuraidah	17–21, 22–20, 16–21	Bronze

=== Commonwealth Youth Games ===
Boys' doubles
Year	Venue	Partner	Opponent	Score	Result
2011	National Sports Centre, Douglas, Isle of Man	(Malaysia) Teo Ee Yi	(England) Ryan McCarthy (England) Tom Wolfenden	24–22, 21–16	Gold

Mixed doubles
Year	Venue	Partner	Opponent	Score	Result
2011	National Sports Centre, Douglas, Isle of Man	(Malaysia) Lee Meng Yean	(England) Ryan McCarthy (England) Emily Westwood	21–14, 21–10	Bronze

=== Asian Junior Championships ===
Boys' doubles
Year	Venue	Partner	Opponent	Score	Result
2010	Stadium Juara; Kuala Lumpur, Malaysia	(Malaysia) Teo Ee Yi	(South Korea) Choi Seung-il (South Korea) Kang Ji-wook	13–21, 14–21	Bronze
2011	Babu Banarasi Das Indoor Stadium; Lucknow, India	(Malaysia) Teo Ee Yi	(Chinese Taipei) Huang Po-jui (Chinese Taipei) Lin Chia-yu	16–21, 21–11, 17–21	Bronze

=== BWF International Challenge/Series (2 titles, 1 runners-up) ===
Men's doubles
Year	Tournament	Partner	Opponent	Score	Result
2012	Dutch International	(Malaysia) Teo Ee Yi	(Netherlands) Jorrit de Ruiter (Netherlands) Dave Khodabux	19–21, 21–13, 21–9	(gold) Winner
2013	Finnish Open	(Malaysia) Teo Ee Yi	(Malaysia) Mohd Lutfi Zaim Abdul Khalid (Malaysia) Tan Wee Gieen	21–14, 21–12	(gold) Winner

Mixed doubles
Year	Tournament	Partner	Opponent	Score	Result
2012	French International	(Malaysia) Chow Mei Kuan	(Germany) Peter Kaesbauer (Germany) Johanna Goliszewski	21–14, 21–12	(silver) Runner-up

BWF International Challenge tournament
BWF International Series tournament
BWF Future Series tournament
