= Joris Grosjean =

French badminton player (born 1993)

Personal information
- Born: 29 July 1993 (age 33)

Sport
- Country: France
- Sport: Badminton

Men's & mixed doubles
- Highest ranking: 90 (MD) 27 Oct 2011; 132 (XD) 15 Sep 2011
- BWF profile
Medal record
Badminton
Representing France
European Junior Championships
Bronze medal – third place	2011 Vantaa	Boys' doubles

Joris Grosjean (born 29 July 1993) is a French male badminton player. In 2011, he won a bronze medal at the European Junior Championships in the boys' doubles event partnered with Lucas Corvée. He and Corvée also became the runner-up at the Estonian International tournament in the men's doubles event.

He also won the gold medal in French championships U13 with Cindy GUERIN in 2006. In 2024, he launches into a singles career with the last result being a defeat against Leo Chabanne.

== Achievements ==
=== European Junior Championships ===
Boys' Doubles
Year	Venue	Partner	Opponent	Score	Result
2011	Energia Areena; Vantaa, Finland	(France) Lucas Corvée	(Germany) Fabian Holzer (Germany) Max Schwenger	18-21, 22-24	Bronze

=== BWF International Challenge/Series ===
Men's Doubles
Year	Tournament	Partner	Opponent	Score	Result
2011	Estonian International	(France) Lucas Corvée	(Germany) Peter Käsbauer (Germany) Josche Zurwonne	8-21, 18-21	(silver) Runner-up

BWF International Challenge tournament
BWF International Series tournament
