= 2011 BWF World Junior Championships =

Tournament details
- Dates: October 28, 2011 - November 6, 2011
- Edition: 13th
- Level: International
- Venue: Taoyuan Arena
- Location: Taoyuan, Taiwan

The 2011 BWF World Junior Championships is the thirteenth tournament of the BWF World Junior Championships. This tournament was held in Taoyuan, Taiwan at Taoyuan Arena from October 28 to November 6, 2011.

== Host city ==
In June 2009, the Chinese Taipei Badminton Association successfully bid for this event. This is also the first time for the Republic of China (Taiwan) officially won the bid to host the badminton World Championships tournament.

== Medalists ==
Event	Gold	Silver	Bronze
Teams	Malaysia; Nur Mohd Azriyn Ayub; Goh Giap Chin; Nelson Heg; Jani Sant Enos; Low Juan Shen; Calvin Ong Jia Hong; Soong Joo Ven; Tai An Khang; Teo Ee Yi; Zulfadli Zulkiffli; Soniia Cheah; Joyce Choong; Chow Mei Kuan; Shevon Jemie Lai; Lee Meng Yean; Lim Chiew Sien; Lim Yin Fun; Yang Li Lian	South Korea; Bae Kwon-young; Choi Sol-gyu; Jun Bong-chan; Jung Jae-wook; Jung Young-joon; Kim Dong-joo; Kim Dong-tak; Lee Hong-je; Park Se-woong; Chae Yoo-jung; Han So-yeon; Kim Chan-mi; Kim Hyo-min; Kim Ye-ji; Lee So-hee; Park So-young; Shin Seung-chan	Chinese Taipei; Chung Sung-han; Huang Kun-xiung; Huang Po-jui; Lin Chia-yu; Tien Tzu-chieh; Wan Chia-hsin; Wang Chi-lin; Wang Chih-hao; Wang Tzu-wei; Wu Hsiao-lin; Chen Pai-jou; Chen Szu-yu; Chen Ting-yi; Kao Chieh-wen; Lin Ying-chun; Shuai Pei-ling; Sung Shuo-yun; Tang Wan-yi; Wu Ti-jung; Yu Chien-hui
Boys singles	(Malaysia) Zulfadli Zulkiffli	(Denmark) Viktor Axelsen	(Japan) Kento Momota
Boys singles	(Malaysia) Zulfadli Zulkiffli	(Denmark) Viktor Axelsen	(India) Sameer Verma
Girls singles	(Thailand) Ratchanok Intanon	(Indonesia) Elyzabeth Purwaningtyas	(Spain) Carolina Marín
Girls singles	(Thailand) Ratchanok Intanon	(Indonesia) Elyzabeth Purwaningtyas	(Japan) Nozomi Okuhara
Boys doubles	(Malaysia) Nelson Heg (Malaysia) Teo Ee Yi	(Chinese Taipei) Huang Po-jui (Chinese Taipei) Lin Chia-yu	(Indonesia) Ronald Alexander (Indonesia) Selvanus Geh
Boys doubles	(Malaysia) Nelson Heg (Malaysia) Teo Ee Yi	(Chinese Taipei) Huang Po-jui (Chinese Taipei) Lin Chia-yu	(Chinese Taipei) Tien Tzu-chieh (Chinese Taipei) Wang Chi-lin
Girls doubles	(South Korea) Lee So-hee (South Korea) Shin Seung-chan	(Indonesia) Shella Devi Aulia (Indonesia) Anggia Shitta Awanda	(Indonesia) Suci Rizky Andini (Indonesia) Tiara Rosalia Nuraidah
Girls doubles	(South Korea) Lee So-hee (South Korea) Shin Seung-chan	(Indonesia) Shella Devi Aulia (Indonesia) Anggia Shitta Awanda	(South Korea) Han So-yeon (South Korea) Kim Hyo-min
Mixed doubles	(Indonesia) Alfian Eko Prasetya (Indonesia) Gloria Emanuelle Widjaja	(Indonesia) Ronald Alexander (Indonesia) Tiara Rosalia Nuraidah	(South Korea) Choi Sol-gyu (South Korea) Chae Yoo-jung
Mixed doubles	(Indonesia) Alfian Eko Prasetya (Indonesia) Gloria Emanuelle Widjaja	(Indonesia) Ronald Alexander (Indonesia) Tiara Rosalia Nuraidah	(Malaysia) Nelson Heg (Malaysia) Chow Mei Kuan

== Team competition ==
A total of 22 countries competed at the team competition in 2011 BWF World Junior Championships.

=== Final positions ===
1. Malaysia
2. South Korea
3. Chinese Taipei
4. Thailand
5. Japan
6. India
7. Indonesia
8. Netherlands
9. Denmark
10. Russia
11. France
12. Turkey
13. Singapore
14. England
15. Hong Kong
16. Germany
17. Finland
18. Australia
19. Canada
20. Egypt
21. United States
22. Macau

=== Final round ===
Malaysia
3
Taoyuan, Taiwan
October 31, 2011

South Korea
0

			1	2	3
1	(Malaysia) (South Korea)	Zulfadli Zulkiffli; Lee Hong-je	17; 21	21; 11	21; 14
2	(Malaysia) (South Korea)	Soniia Cheah; Kim Hyo-min	25; 23	21; 12
3	(Malaysia) (South Korea)	Nelson Heg / Teo Ee Yi; Choi Sol-gyu / Jun Bong-chan	16; 21	21; 18	21; 12
4	(Malaysia) (South Korea)	Chow Mei Kuan / Lee Meng Yean; Lee So-hee / Shin Seung-chan				not played
5	(Malaysia) (South Korea)	Teo Ee Yi / Chow Mei Kuan; Lee Hong-je / Shin Seung-chan				not played

== Medal table ==
Rank	Nation	Gold	Silver	Bronze	Total
1	Malaysia (MAS)	3	0	1	4
2	Indonesia (INA)	1	3	2	6
3	South Korea (KOR)	1	1	2	4
4	Thailand (THA)	1	0	0	1
5	Chinese Taipei (TPE)	0	1	2	3
6	Denmark (DEN)	0	1	0	1
7	Japan (JPN)	0	0	2	2
8	India (IND)	0	0	1	1
8	Spain (ESP)	0	0	1	1
Totals (9 entries)		6	6	11	23

== See also ==
- List of sporting events in Taiwan
