= Lin Chia-yu =

Taiwanese badminton player (born 1993)

Lin Chia-yu 林家佑
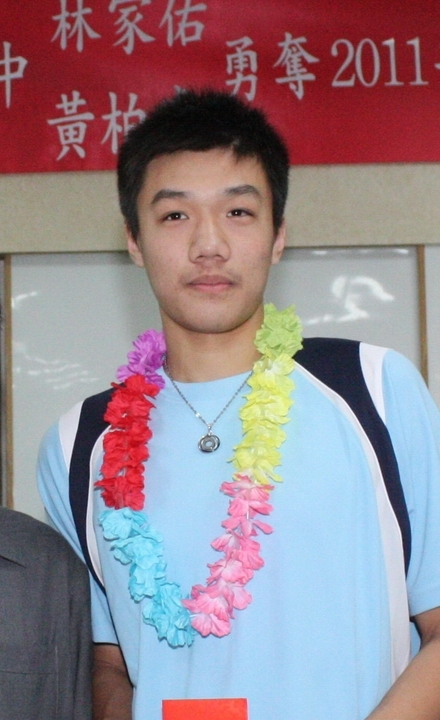
- Lin in 2011

Personal information
- Born: 30 June 1993 (age 33) Yunlin, Taiwan
- Height: 1.84 m (6 ft 0 in)
- Spouse: Hsu Ya-ching (m. 2018)

Sport
- Country: Republic of China (Taiwan)
- Sport: Badminton
- Handedness: Right

Men's & mixed doubles
- Highest ranking: 39 (MD, 2 June 2016); 33 (XD, 12 October 2017)
- BWF profile
Medal record
Men's badminton
Representing Chinese Taipei
World Junior Championships
Silver medal – second place	2011 Taipei	Boys' doubles
Bronze medal – third place	2011 Taipei	Mixed team
Asian Junior Championships
Gold medal – first place	2011 Lucknow	Boys' doubles

Lin Chia-yu (Chinese: 林家佑; pinyin: Lín Jiāyòu; Wade–Giles: Lin Chia-yu; born 30 June 1993) is a Taiwanese badminton player. In 2011, he won the gold medal at the Asian Junior Championships in the men's doubles event partnered with Huang Po-jui. He also won the silver medal at the World Junior Championships.

He is married to former doubles partner Hsu Ya-ching.

== Achievements ==
=== BWF World Junior Championships ===
Boys' doubles
Year	Venue	Partner	Opponent	Score	Result
2011	Taoyuan Arena, Taoyuan City, Taipei, Chinese Taipei	(Chinese Taipei) Huang Po-jui	(Malaysia) Nelson Heg Wei Keat (Malaysia) Teo Ee Yi	17–21, 17–21	Silver

=== Asian Junior Championships ===
Boys' doubles
Year	Venue	Partner	Opponent	Score	Result
2011	Babu Banarasi Das Indoor Stadium, Lucknow, India	(Chinese Taipei) Huang Po-jui	(Chinese Taipei) Huang Chu-en (Chinese Taipei) Lu Ching-yao	21–14, 21–13	Gold

=== BWF Grand Prix (1 runner-up) ===
The BWF Grand Prix had two levels, the BWF Grand Prix and Grand Prix Gold. It was a series of badminton tournaments sanctioned by the Badminton World Federation (BWF) and held from 2007 to 2017.

Men's doubles
Year	Tournament	Partner	Opponent	Score	Result
2013	Vietnam Open	(Chinese Taipei) Wu Hsiao-lin	(Indonesia) Fran Kurniawan (Indonesia) Bona Septano	21–18, 18–21, 18–21	(silver) Runner-up

BWF Grand Prix Gold tournament
BWF Grand Prix tournament

=== BWF International Challenge/Series (3 titles, 2 runners-up) ===
Men's doubles
Year	Tournament	Partner	Opponent	Score	Result
2014	Malaysia International	(Chinese Taipei) Wu Hsiao-lin	(Malaysia) Chow Pak Chuu (Malaysia) Mak Hee Chun	21–12, 10–21, 22–20	(gold) Winner
2015	Malaysia International	(Chinese Taipei) Wu Hsiao-lin	(Chinese Taipei) Lee Jhe-huei (Chinese Taipei) Lee Yang	17–21, 21–16, 21–18	(gold) Winner
2015	USA International	(Chinese Taipei) Wu Hsiao-lin	(Germany) Michael Fuchs (Germany) Johannes Schöttler	16–21, 23–21, 21–19	(gold) Winner
2022	Bonn International	(Chinese Taipei) Liao Chao-pang	(Chinese Taipei) Chiu Hsiang-chieh (Chinese Taipei) Yang Ming-tse	15–21, 14–21	(silver) Runner-up

Mixed doubles
Year	Tournament	Partner	Opponent	Score	Result
2013	Osaka International	(Chinese Taipei) Wang Pei-rong	(Indonesia) Lukhi Apri Nugroho (Indonesia) Annisa Saufika	16–21, 19–21	(silver) Runner-up

BWF International Challenge tournament
BWF International Series tournament
BWF Future Series tournament
