= Huang Po-jui =

Taiwanese badminton player (born 1993)

Huang Po-jui 黃柏睿
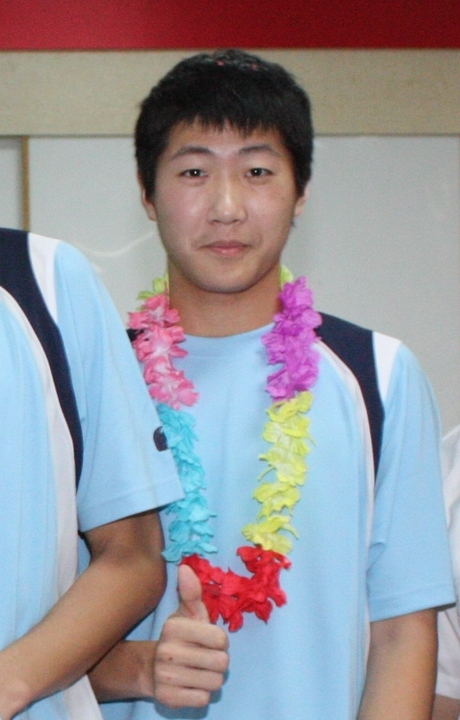

Personal information
- Born: 11 April 1993 (age 33)

Sport
- Country: Republic of China (Taiwan)
- Sport: Badminton

Men's singles & doubles
- Highest ranking: 528 (MS 19 April 2012); 35 (MD 25 September 2014); 103 (XD 24 April 2014)
- BWF profile
Medal record
Men's badminton
Representing Chinese Taipei
World Junior Championships
Silver medal – second place	2011 Taipei	Boys' doubles
Bronze medal – third place	2011 Taipei	Mixed team
Asian Junior Championships
Gold medal – first place	2011 Lucknow	Boys' doubles

Huang Po-jui (Chinese: 黃柏睿; pinyin: Huáng Bóruì; born 11 April 1993) is a Taiwanese badminton player. In 2011, he won the gold medal at the Asian Junior Championships in the men's doubles event partnered with Lin Chia-yu. He also won the silver medal at the World Junior Championships.

== Achievements ==
=== BWF World Junior Championships ===
Boys' doubles
Year	Venue	Partner	Opponent	Score	Result
2011	Taoyuan Arena, Taoyuan City, Taipei, Chinese Taipei	(Chinese Taipei) Lin Chia-yu	(Malaysia) Nelson Heg Wei Keat (Malaysia) Teo Ee Yi	17–21, 17–21	Silver

=== Asian Junior Championships ===
Boys' doubles
Year	Venue	Partner	Opponent	Score	Result
2011	Babu Banarasi Das Indoor Stadium, Lucknow, India	(Chinese Taipei) Lin Chia-yu	(Chinese Taipei) Huang Chu-en (Chinese Taipei) Lu Ching-yao	21–14, 21–13	Gold

=== BWF International Challenge/Series ===
Men's doubles
Year	Tournament	Partner	Opponent	Score	Result
2014	Finnish Open	(Chinese Taipei) Lu Ching-yao	(Denmark) Kim Astrup (Denmark) Anders Skaarup Rasmussen	18–21, 17–21	(silver) Runner-up
2014	Singapore International	(Chinese Taipei) Lu Ching-yao	(Malaysia) Jagdish Singh (Malaysia) Roni Tan Wee Long	21–14, 15–21, 21–16	(gold) Winner

BWF International Challenge tournament
BWF International Series tournament
BWF Future Series tournament
