= 2016 Vietnam Open Grand Prix =

Tournament details
- Dates: 18 – 24 July 2016
- Level: Grand Prix
- Total prize money: US$55,000
- Venue: Nguyen Du Stadium
- Location: Ho Chi Minh City, Vietnam

Champions
- Men's singles: (Hong Kong) Wong Wing Ki
- Women's singles: (Singapore) Yeo Jia Min
- Men's doubles: (Chinese Taipei) Lee Jhe-huei (Chinese Taipei) Lee Yang
- Women's doubles: (Indonesia) Della Destiara Haris (Indonesia) Rosyita Eka Putri Sari
- Mixed doubles: (Malaysia) Tan Kian Meng (Malaysia) Lai Pei Jing

The 2016 Vietnam Open Grand Prix, is the eleventh Grand Prix's badminton tournament of the 2016 BWF Grand Prix and Grand Prix Gold. The tournament will be held at the Nguyen Du Stadium in Ho Chi Minh City, Vietnam on 18–24 July 2016 and has a total purse of $55,000.

== Men's singles ==
=== Seeds ===
1. (Hong Kong) Hu Yun (withdrew)
2. (Hong Kong) Ng Ka Long (withdrew)
3. (Hong Kong) Wei Nan (first round)
4. (Hong Kong) Wong Wing Ki (champion)
5. (Thailand) Tanongsak Saensomboonsuk (second round)
6. (Vietnam) Nguyen Tien Minh (first round)
7. (Chinese Taipei) Wang Tzu-wei (third round)
8. (Malaysia) Zulfadli Zulkiffli (quarterfinal)
9. (India) Sameer Verma (withdrew)
10. (Russia) Vladimir Malkov (second round)
11. (Malaysia) Chong Wei Feng (final)
12. (Japan) Kanta Tsuneyama (withdrew)
13. (South Africa) Jacob Maliekal (first round)
14. (Chinese Taipei) Lin Yu-hsien (semifinal)
15. (India) Harsheel Dani (second round)
16. (Indonesia) Muhammad Bayu Pangisthu (second round)

=== Finals ===
Quarterfinals
(Indonesia) Firman Abdul Kholik	21	21
(Indonesia) Evert Sukamata	13	14
11	(Malaysia) Chong Wei Feng	21	21
(Indonesia) Shesar Hiren Rhustavito	19	14
8	(Malaysia) Zulfadli Zulkiffli	8	12
4	(Hong Kong) Wong Wing Ki	21	21
(India) Siril Verma	4	21	19
14	(Chinese Taipei) Lin Yu-hsien	21	15	21

Semifinals
(Indonesia) Firman Abdul Kholik	19	15
11	(Malaysia) Chong Wei Feng	21	21
4	(Hong Kong) Wong Wing Ki	21	21
14	(Chinese Taipei) Lin Yu-hsien	11	17

Final
11	(Malaysia) Chong Wei Feng	12	21	13
4	(Hong Kong) Wong Wing Ki	21	14	21

=== Top half ===
==== Section 1 ====
First Round
PFQ	(Vietnam) Le D P	18	10
(Chinese Taipei) Lu C-h	21	21
(Malaysia) Tan C S	21	14	21
(India) H Aggarwal	12	21	9
10	(Russia) V Malkov	22	21
(India) R Y Chittaboina	20	17
(Indonesia) F A Kholik	22	23
(Japan) Y Onodera	20	21

Second Round
(Chinese Taipei) Lu C-h	11	10
(Malaysia) Tan C S	21	21
10	(Russia) V Malkov	14	21	12
(Indonesia) F A Kholik	21	9	21

Third Round
(Malaysia) Tan C S	14	15
(Indonesia) F A Kholik	21	21

==== Section 2 ====
First Round
7	(Chinese Taipei) Wang T-w	23	21
Q4	(Japan) Y Igarashi	21	16
(Chinese Taipei) Shih K-c	21	21
Q8	(Vietnam) Tran T H	13	14
PFQ	(Thailand) K Imnark	21	21
(Vietnam) Nguyen H N	10	14
(Indonesia) E Sukamta	21	21
Q3	(Thailand) P Srimanta	12	11

Second Round
7	(Chinese Taipei) Wang T-w	21	21
(Chinese Taipei) Shih K-c	9	19
PFQ	(Thailand) K Imnark	17	21	12
(Indonesia) E Sukamta	21	18	21

Third Round
7	(Chinese Taipei) Wang T-w	17	21	15
(Indonesia) E Sukamta	21	17	21

==== Section 3 ====
First Round
3	(Hong Kong) Wei N	16	21	19
(Japan) K Watanabe	21	14	21
(Indonesia) K A Nugraha	21	18	21
(Malaysia) M A Abdul Latif	19	21	12
11	(Malaysia) Chong W F	21	21
(Chinese Taipei) Chi Y-j	9	8
(Hong Kong) Lee C Y	26	17	21
Q6	(China) Xu YM	24	21	15

Second Round
(Japan) K Watanabe	22	17	21
(Indonesia) K A Nugraha	20	21	17
11	(Malaysia) Chong W F	21	21
(Hong Kong) Lee C Y	12	17

Third Round
(Japan) K Watanabe	16	12
11	(Malaysia) Chong W F	21	21

==== Section 4 ====
First Round
5	(Thailand) T Saensomboonsuk	w	/	o
(Venezuela) J Wu Zheng
Q7	(Vietnam) Truong T L	9	13
(Indonesia) S H Rhustavito	21	21
PFQ	(Hong Kong) Lee C W	21	13	11
(Indonesia) P A Maulana	16	21	21
Q2	(Chinese Taipei) Chang E-c	18	21	17
(Indonesia) W Y Prasetyo	21	11	21

Second Round
5	(Thailand) T Saensomboonsuk	14	21	17
(Indonesia) S H Rhustavito	21	14	21
(Indonesia) P A Maulana	11	15
(Indonesia) W Y Prasetyo	21	21

Third Round
(Indonesia) S H Rhustavito	21	21
(Indonesia) W Y Prasetyo	15	9

=== Bottom half ===
==== Section 5 ====
First Round
(India) A Yelegar	21	21
(Chinese Taipei) Lin C-h	13	5
(Thailand) M Narongrit	23	21
13	(South Africa) J Maliekal	21	15
(Indonesia) F I Hadmadi	21	16	19
(India) P Joshi	11	21	21
(Indonesia) K H Wibowo	21	13	11
8	(Malaysia) Z Zulkiffli	19	21	21

Second Round
(India) A Yelegar	13	9
(Thailand) M Narongrit	21	21
(India) P Joshi	10	13
8	(Malaysia) Z Zulkiffli	21	21

Third Round
(Thailand) M Narongrit	8	9
8	(Malaysia) Z Zulkiffli	21	21

==== Section 6 ====
First Round
(India) A Joshi	21	21
(Indonesia) T A Mahbub	18	15
PFQ	(Thailand) K Laotrakul	21	15	18
15	(India) H Dani	15	21	21
(Japan) H Shimono	21	21
(Malaysia) Chiang J S	18	12
(Chinese Taipei) Kuo C-h	21	12	12
4	(Hong Kong) Wong W K	17	21	21

Second Round
(India) A Joshi	21	16	21
15	(India) H Dani	18	21	18
(Japan) H Shimono	21	19	15
4	(Hong Kong) Wong W K	16	21	21

Third Round
(India) A Joshi	11	16
4	(Hong Kong) Wong W K	21	21

==== Section 7 ====
First Round
(Singapore) Loh K Y	21	27
Q5	(Thailand) P Nipornram	14	25
PFQ	(Thailand) N Singrueang	17	6
16	(Indonesia) M B Pangisthu	21	21
(India) S Jaiswal	21	21
Q1	(Thailand) S Jamsri	8	13
(India) S Verma	6	21	13
6	(Vietnam) Nguyen T M	21	7	5^{r}

Second Round
(Singapore) Loh K Y	21	21
16	(Indonesia) M B Pangisthu	10	18
(India) S Jaiswal	14	15
(India) S Verma	21	21

Third Round
(Singapore) Loh K Y	19	15
(India) S Verma	21	21

==== Section 8 ====
First Round
(India) S Dey	5	7
(Malaysia) Goh G C	21	21
(Malaysia) K Kumar	11	7
14	(Chinese Taipei) Lin Y-h	21	21
(India) K Dharmamer	14	15
(Indonesia) R Subagja	21	21
(Indonesia) A Marteen	19	21	20
PFQ	(Thailand) K Vitidsarn	21	16	22

Second Round
(Malaysia) Goh G C	16	21	19
14	(Chinese Taipei) Lin Y-h	21	6	21
(Indonesia) R Subagja	21	21
PFQ	(Thailand) K Vitidsarn	14	12

Third Round
14	(Chinese Taipei) Lin Y-h	21	18	21
(Indonesia) R Subagja	13	21	14

== Women's singles ==
=== Seeds ===
1. (Chinese Taipei) Hsu Ya-ching (semifinal)
2. (Hong Kong) Yip Pui Yin (withdrew)
3. (Hong Kong) Cheung Ngan Yi (quarterfinal)
4. (Vietnam) Vu Thi Trang (quarterfinal)
5. (Indonesia) Fitriani (quarterfinal)
6. (Russia) Natalia Perminova (first round)
7. (Indonesia) Hana Ramadhini (first round)
8. (Finland) Nanna Vainio (first round)

=== Finals ===
Semifinals
1	(Chinese Taipei) Hsu Ya-ching	16	21	12
(Japan) Ayumi Mine	21	8	21
Q4	(Malaysia) Sonia Cheah Su Ya	17	12
(Singapore) Yeo Jia Min	21	21

Final
(Japan) Ayumi Mine	14	17
(Singapore) Yeo Jia Min	21	21

=== Top half ===
==== Section 1 ====
First Round
1	(Chinese Taipei) Hsu Y-c	21	21
Q2	(Thailand) K Khongdee	18	16
(India) P. C. Thulasi	21	7	13
(Indonesia) D D Ayustine	15	21	21
5	(Indonesia) Fitriani	21	15	21
(Singapore) Grace Chua H Z	12	21	16
(Indonesia) R A Riodingin	8	15
Q1	(Japan) N Nidaira	21	21

Second Round
1	(Chinese Taipei) Hsu Y-c	21	21
(Indonesia) D D Ayustine	15	12
5	(Indonesia) Fitriani	21	21
Q1	(Japan) N Nidaira	14	16

Quarterfinals
1	(Chinese Taipei) Hsu Y-c	21	14	21
5	(Indonesia) Fitriani	13	21	17

==== Section 2 ====
First Round
3	(Hong Kong) Cheung N Y	21	21
(Indonesia) R Hartawan	16	13
(Vietnam) Nguyen T L	21	21
(Chinese Taipei) Yu C-h	13	17
8	(Finland) N Vainio	11	16
(Thailand) S Katethong	21	21
(Malaysia) Yang L L	21	10
(Japan) A Mine	23	21

Second Round
3	(Hong Kong) Cheung N Y	21	21
(Vietnam) Nguyen T L	5	13
(Thailand) S Katethong	17	21	15
(Japan) A Mine	21	15	21

Quarterfinals
3	(Hong Kong) Cheung N Y	18	16
(Japan) A Mine	21	21

=== Bottom half ===
==== Section 3 ====
First Round
Q4	(Malaysia) Sonia Cheah S Y	21	21
(Indonesia) F Angguni	16	13
(Malaysia) Lim Y F	21	22
7	(Indonesia) H Ramadhini	17	20
(Indonesia) Y Y Susanto	21	16	21
Q3	(Thailand) C Korepap	18	21	14
(Chinese Taipei) Cheng C-y	12	25	14
4	(Vietnam) Vu T T	21	23	21

Second Round
Q4	(Malaysia) Sonia Cheah S Y	21	21
(Malaysia) Lim Y F	9	18
(Indonesia) Y Y Susanto	17	20
4	(Vietnam) Vu T T	21	22

Quarterfinals
Q4	(Malaysia) Sonia Cheah S Y	21	0
4	(Vietnam) Vu T T	10	0^{r}

==== Section 4 ====
First Round
(Thailand) S Suwannakitborihan	21	21
(India) S Rane	9	15
(Singapore) Yeo J M	21	21
6	(Russia) N Perminova	17	18
(Malaysia) Lyddia Cheah Y Y	19	21
(Chinese Taipei) Chiang M-h	21	23
(Indonesia) S Fatmawati	23	17	18
PFQ	(India) R Das	21	21	21

Second Round
(Thailand) S Suwannakitborihan	16	20
(Singapore) Yeo J M	21	22
(Chinese Taipei) Chiang M-h	21	19	21
PFQ	(India) R Das	19	21	14

Quarterfinals
(Singapore) Yeo J M	21	21
(Chinese Taipei) Chiang M-h	18	13

== Men's doubles ==
=== Seeds ===
1. (Malaysia) Koo Kien Keat / Tan Boon Heong (final)
2. (Chinese Taipei) Lee Jhe-huei / Lee Yang (champion)
3. (Hong Kong) Or Chin Chung / Tang Chun Man (quarterfinal)
4. (Indonesia) Hardianto / Kenas Adi Haryanto (semifinal)
5. (Malaysia) Hoon Thien How / Teo Kok Siang (second round)
6. (Singapore) Danny Bawa Chrisnanta / Hendra Wijaya (first round)
7. (Indonesia) Hendra Aprida Gunawan / Markis Kido (second round)
8. (Indonesia) Fajar Alfian / Muhammad Rian Ardianto (second round)

=== Finals ===
Semifinals
1	(Malaysia) Koo Kien Keat (Malaysia) Tan Boon Heong	21	21
(Malaysia) Lim Khim Wah (Malaysia) Ong Jian Guo	14	10
4	(Indonesia) Hardianto (Indonesia) Kenas Adi Haryanto	21	19	15
2	(Chinese Taipei) Lee Jhe-huei (Chinese Taipei) Lee Yang	16	21	21

Final
1	(Malaysia) Koo Kien Keat (Malaysia) Tan Boon Heong	21	14	7
2	(Chinese Taipei) Lee Jhe-huei (Chinese Taipei) Lee Yang	18	21	21

=== Top half ===
==== Section 1 ====
First Round
1	(Malaysia) Koo K K (Malaysia) Tan B H	15	21	21
(Chinese Taipei) Liu W-c (Chinese Taipei) Tseng M-h	21	19	17
(Malaysia) Tan C T (Malaysia) Tan W G	21	12	21
Q1	(China) Kang J (China) Zhang SJ	10	21	18
7	(Indonesia) H A Gunawan (Indonesia) M Kido	21	8	21
(Japan) T Inoue (Japan) Y Kaneko	19	21	18
(Vietnam) Do T C (Vietnam) Pham H M	12	8
(Malaysia) Chooi K M (Malaysia) Low J S	21	21

Second Round
1	(Malaysia) Koo K K (Malaysia) Tan B H	21	21
(Malaysia) Tan C T (Malaysia) Tan W G	13	12
7	(Indonesia) H A Gunawan (Indonesia) M Kido	22	16	18
(Malaysia) Chooi K M (Malaysia) Low J S	20	21	21

Quarterfinals
1	(Malaysia) Koo K K (Malaysia) Tan B H	21	18	21
(Malaysia) Chooi K M (Malaysia) Low J S	7	21	19

==== Section 2 ====
First Round
3	(Hong Kong) Or C C (Hong Kong) Tang C M	21	21
(Chinese Taipei) Lin S-k (Chinese Taipei) Yang P-h	11	19
(India) V Prasad (India) J Yadav	14	12
Q3	(Thailand) T Viriyangkura (Thailand) W Uttamang	21	21
6	(Singapore) D B Chrisnanta (Singapore) H Wijaya	17	19
(Malaysia) Lim K W (Malaysia) Ong J G	21	21
(Chinese Taipei) Po L-w (Chinese Taipei) Yang M-t	21	21	18
(Malaysia) Tai A K (Malaysia) Yew H K	23	16	21

Second Round
3	(Hong Kong) Or C C (Hong Kong) Tang C M	21	21
Q3	(Thailand) T Viriyangkura (Thailand) W Uttamang	16	14
(Malaysia) Lim K W (Malaysia) Ong J G	21	21
(Malaysia) Tai A K (Malaysia) Yew H K	16	19

Quarterfinals
3	(Hong Kong) Or C C (Hong Kong) Tang C M	17	19
(Malaysia) Lim K W (Malaysia) Ong J G	21	21

=== Bottom half ===
==== Section 3 ====
First Round
(Thailand) N Singrueang (Thailand) P Thongnuam	14	9
(Chinese Taipei) Liao K-h (Chinese Taipei) Lu C-p	21	21
(Chinese Taipei) Chang K-c (Chinese Taipei) Liang J-w	12	13
8	(Indonesia) F Alfian (Indonesia) M R Ardianto	21	21
(Japan) T Shimada (Japan) Y Takeuchi	8	10
(Chinese Taipei) Liao M-c (Chinese Taipei) Su C-h	21	21
(Vietnam) Bao M (Vietnam) Duong B D	15	21	15
4	(Indonesia) Hardianto (Indonesia) K A Haryanto	21	14	21

Second Round
(Chinese Taipei) Liao K-h (Chinese Taipei) Lu C-p	21	14	21
8	(Indonesia) F Alfian (Indonesia) M R Ardianto	19	21	19
(Chinese Taipei) Liao M-c (Chinese Taipei) Su C-h	21	16	15
4	(Indonesia) Hardianto (Indonesia) K A Haryanto	19	21	21

Quarterfinals
(Chinese Taipei) Liao K-h (Chinese Taipei) Lu C-p	15	14
4	(Indonesia) Hardianto (Indonesia) K A Haryanto	21	21

==== Section 4 ====
First Round
(Chinese Taipei) Lu C-y (Chinese Taipei) Yang P-h	21	21
(India) N Kidambi (India) S Shukla	18	13
(Singapore) Terry Hee Y K (Singapore) Loh K H	17	6
5	(Malaysia) Hoon T H (Malaysia) Teo K S	21	21
(Malaysia) N M A Ayub (Malaysia) J Singh	21	20	21
Q4	(Chinese Taipei) Huang C-e (Chinese Taipei) Wang C-h	13	22	16
Q2	(Hong Kong) Y Chung (Hong Kong) Tam C H	18	17
2	(Chinese Taipei) Lee J-h (Chinese Taipei) Lee Y	21	21

Second Round
(Chinese Taipei) Lu C-y (Chinese Taipei) Yang P-h	26	21
5	(Malaysia) Hoon T H (Malaysia) Teo K S	24	16
(Malaysia) N M A Ayub (Malaysia) J Singh	18	18
2	(Chinese Taipei) Lee J-h (Chinese Taipei) Lee Y	21	21

Quarterfinals
(Chinese Taipei) Lu C-y (Chinese Taipei) Yang P-h	21	17	16
2	(Chinese Taipei) Lee J-h (Chinese Taipei) Lee Y	18	21	21

== Women's doubles ==
=== Seeds ===
1. (Bulgaria) Gabriela Stoeva / Stefani Stoeva (quarterfinal)
2. (Hong Kong) Poon Lok Yan / Tse Ying Suet (withdrew)
3. (Indonesia) Della Destiara Haris / Rosyita Eka Putri Sari (champion)
4. (Thailand) Chayanit Chaladchalam / Phataimas Muenwong (quarterfinal)
5. (Indonesia) Tiara Rosalia Nuraidah / Rizki Amelia Pradipta (final)
6. (Japan) Shiho Tanaka / Koharu Yonemoto (quarterfinal)
7. (Japan) Rie Etoh / Aoi Matsuda (first round)
8. (Malaysia) Chow Mei Kuan / Lee Meng Yean (first round)

=== Finals ===
Semifinals
5	(Indonesia) Tiara Rosalia Nuraidah (Indonesia) Rizki Amelia Pradipta	21	21
Q2	(China) Cheng Shu (China) Sun Xiaoli	15	19
3	(Indonesia) Della Destiara Haris (Indonesia) Rosyita Eka Putri Sari	13	21	21
Q3	(Japan) Ayako Sakuramoto (Japan) Yukiko Takahata	21	19	15

Final
5	(Indonesia) Tiara Rosalia Nuraidah (Indonesia) Rizki Amelia Pradipta	11	15
3	(Indonesia) Della Destiara Haris (Indonesia) Rosyita Eka Putri Sari	21	21

=== Top half ===
==== Section 1 ====
First Round
1	(Bulgaria) G Stoeva (Bulgaria) S Stoeva
Q1	BYE
(Chinese Taipei) Cheng C-y (Chinese Taipei) Yu C-h	21	21
(Thailand) P Chamnaktan (Thailand) K Sudjaipraparat	14	11
5	(Indonesia) T R Nuraidah (Indonesia) R A Pradipta	21	21
(Chinese Taipei) Chang H-t (Chinese Taipei) Peng L-t	17	13
(Thailand) B Aimsaard (Thailand) N Aimsaard	21	22
(Singapore) Elaine Chua Y L (Singapore) C D Sari	13	20

Second Round
1	(Bulgaria) G Stoeva (Bulgaria) S Stoeva	21	21
(Chinese Taipei) Cheng C-y (Chinese Taipei) Yu C-h	6	10
5	(Indonesia) T R Nuraidah (Indonesia) R A Pradipta	21	14	21
(Thailand) B Aimsaard (Thailand) N Aimsaard	9	21	16

Quarterfinals
1	(Bulgaria) G Stoeva (Bulgaria) S Stoeva	15	17
5	(Indonesia) T R Nuraidah (Indonesia) R A Pradipta	21	21

==== Section 2 ====
First Round
4	(Thailand) C Chaladchalam (Thailand) P Muenwong	21	21
(Chinese Taipei) Lee W-t (Chinese Taipei) Yu M-j	17	13
(Thailand) N Chatupornkarnchana (Thailand) S Chumnibannakarn	6	12
(Japan) Y Fukushima (Japan) C Shida	21	21
7	(Japan) R Etoh (Japan) A Matsuda	17	14
Q2	(China) Cheng S (China) Sun XL	21	21
(Vietnam) Le T H (Vietnam) Pham N T	19	10^{r}
Q4	(Vietnam) Nguyen T P H (Vietnam) Nguyen T L	21	21

Second Round
4	(Thailand) C Chaladchalam (Thailand) P Muenwong	21	20	21
(Japan) Y Fukushima (Japan) C Shida	12	22	19
Q2	(China) Cheng S (China) Sun XL	21	17	21
Q4	(Vietnam) Nguyen T P H (Vietnam) Nguyen T L	17	21	15

Quarterfinals
4	(Thailand) C Chaladchalam (Thailand) P Muenwong	21	17	10
Q2	(China) Cheng S (China) Sun XL	16	21	21

=== Bottom half ===
==== Section 3 ====
First Round
(Thailand) R Laisuan (Thailand) Alisa Sapniti	14	12
(Indonesia) N P Lestari (Indonesia) M C Sahputri	21	21
(Chinese Taipei) Chiang K-h (Chinese Taipei) Hung S-h	10	21	19
6	(Japan) S Tanaka (Japan) K Yonemoto	21	17	21
(Chinese Taipei) Chen S-y (Chinese Taipei) Hsu Y-c	21	21
(Indonesia) V Putri (Indonesia) P H Mentari	18	12
(Thailand) R Iamratanamaetheekul (Thailand) S Mingchua	7	9
3	(Indonesia) D D Haris (Indonesia) R E Putri Sari	21	21

Second Round
(Indonesia) N P Lestari (Indonesia) M C Sahputri	17	17
6	(Japan) S Tanaka (Japan) K Yonemoto	21	21
(Chinese Taipei) Chen S-y (Chinese Taipei) Hsu Y-c	18	15
3	(Indonesia) D D Haris (Indonesia) R E Putri Sari	21	21

Quarterfinals
6	(Japan) S Tanaka (Japan) K Yonemoto	15	11
3	(Indonesia) D D Haris (Indonesia) R E Putri Sari	21	21

==== Section 4 ====
First Round
(Indonesia) N Herloardjo (Indonesia) R S Putri	10	5
Q3	(Japan) A Sakuramoto (Japan) Y Takahata	21	21
(Japan) S Hirota (Japan) N Ono	21	21
8	(Malaysia) Chow M K (Malaysia) Lee M Y	15	13
(Vietnam) Nguyen T S (Vietnam) Vu T T	19	21	21
(Chinese Taipei) Hsieh P-s (Chinese Taipei) Lee C-c	21	19	19
(China) Dong YR (China) Xia YT	21	21
PFQ	(Thailand) K Khongdee (Thailand) T Wongya	11	15

Second Round
Q3	(Japan) A Sakuramoto (Japan) Y Takahata	21	21
(Japan) S Hirota (Japan) N Ono	17	11
(Vietnam) Nguyen T S (Vietnam) Vu T T	21	21
(China) Dong YR (China) Xia YT	16	12

Quarterfinals
Q3	(Japan) A Sakuramoto (Japan) Y Takahata	w	/	o
(Vietnam) Nguyen T S (Vietnam) Vu T T

== Mixed doubles ==
=== Seeds ===
1. (Singapore) Terry Hee Yong Kai / Tan Wei Han (first round)
2. (Indonesia) Hafiz Faisal / Shella Devi Aulia (semifinal)
3. (Malaysia) Tan Kian Meng / Lai Pei Jing (champion)
4. (Indonesia) Alfian Eko Prasetya / Annisa Saufika (final)
5. (Indonesia) Rafiddias Akhdan Nugroho / Richi Puspita Dili (second round)
6. (Chinese Taipei) Chang Ko-chi / Chang Hsin-tien (quarterfinal)
7. (Indonesia) Edi Subaktiar / Masita Mahmudin (quarterfinal)
8. (Indonesia) Irfan Fadhilah / Weni Anggraini (quarterfinal)

=== Finals ===
Semifinals
(Chinese Taipei) Tseng Min-hao (Chinese Taipei) Hsieh Pei-shan	21	19	16
4	(Indonesia) Alfian Eko Prasetya (Indonesia) Annisa Saufika	18	21	21
3	(Malaysia) Tan Kian Meng (Malaysia) Lai Pei Jing	23	21
2	(Indonesia) Hafiz Faisal (Indonesia) Shella Devi Aulia	21	19

Final
4	(Indonesia) Alfian Eko Prasetya (Indonesia) Annisa Saufika	16	11
3	(Malaysia) Tan Kian Meng (Malaysia) Lai Pei Jing	21	21

=== Top half ===
==== Section 1 ====
First Round
1	(Singapore) Terry Hee Y K (Singapore) Tan W H	15	21	20
Q1	(Japan) T Takashina (Japan) R Etoh	21	15	22
(Thailand) W Uttamang (Thailand) K Khongdee	15	16
(Chinese Taipei) Lu C-y (Chinese Taipei) Chiang K-h	21	21
5	(Indonesia) R A Nugroho (Indonesia) R P Dili	21	21
PFQ	(Vietnam) Ho Nguyen V Q (Vietnam) Le T T T	14	15
(Indonesia) A Firmansyah (Indonesia) N Herloardjo	11	9
(Chinese Taipei) Tseng Min-hao (Chinese Taipei) Hsieh P-s	21	21

Second Round
Q1	(Japan) T Takashina (Japan) R Etoh	17	21	19
(Chinese Taipei) Lu C-y (Chinese Taipei) Chiang K-h	21	12	21
5	(Indonesia) R A Nugroho (Indonesia) R P Dili	21	26	21
(Chinese Taipei) Tseng Min-hao (Chinese Taipei) Hsieh P-s	14	28	23

Quarterfinals
(Chinese Taipei) Lu C-y (Chinese Taipei) Chiang K-h	21	19	16
(Chinese Taipei) Tseng Min-hao (Chinese Taipei) Hsieh P-s	18	21	21

==== Section 2 ====
First Round
4	(Indonesia) A E Prasetya (Indonesia) A Saufika	21	21
(Chinese Taipei) Liao M-c (Chinese Taipei) Lee C-c	18	15
PFQ	(Singapore) D B Chrisnanta (Singapore) Elaine Chua Y L	21	19	21
Q2	(China) Zhang SJ (China) Cheng S	13	21	16
8	(Indonesia) I Fadhilah (Indonesia) W Anggraini	21	21
(Chinese Taipei) Liang J-w (Chinese Taipei) Cheng C-y	18	10
(Vietnam) Do T D (Vietnam) Pham N T	18	20
(Thailand) P Thongnuam (Thailand) N Saengchote	21	22

Second Round
4	(Indonesia) A E Prasetya (Indonesia) A Saufika	21	21
PFQ	(Singapore) D B Chrisnanta (Singapore) Elaine Chua Y L	19	17
8	(Indonesia) I Fadhilah (Indonesia) W Anggraini	21	9	21
(Thailand) P Thongnuam (Thailand) N Saengchote	16	21	18

Quarterfinals
4	(Indonesia) A E Prasetya (Indonesia) A Saufika	21	21
8	(Indonesia) I Fadhilah (Indonesia) W Anggraini	18	14

=== Bottom half ===
==== Section 3 ====
First Round
(Thailand) W Sarapat (Thailand) R Iamratanamaetheekul	21	19	21
(Chinese Taipei) Lu C-p (Chinese Taipei) Peng L-t	15	21	14
(Thailand) P Worasaktyanan (Thailand) A Sapniti	16	21	13
6	(Chinese Taipei) Chang K-c (Chinese Taipei) Chang H-t	21	16	21
Q4	(China) Cai RQ (China) Dong YR	21	21
(Indonesia) B Drajat (Indonesia) R S Putri	5	10
(Thailand) P Kuna-Anuvit (Thailand) K Sudjaipraparat	12	11
3	(Malaysia) Tan K M (Malaysia) Lai P J	21	21

Second Round
(Thailand) W Sarapat (Thailand) R Iamratanamaetheekul	13	19
6	(Chinese Taipei) Chang K-c (Chinese Taipei) Chang H-t	21	21
Q4	(China) Cai RQ (China) Dong YR	15	16
3	(Malaysia) Tan K M (Malaysia) Lai P J	21	21

Quarterfinals
6	(Chinese Taipei) Chang K-c (Chinese Taipei) Chang H-t	25	21	4
3	(Malaysia) Tan K M (Malaysia) Lai P J	27	19	21

==== Section 4 ====
First Round
(Thailand) T Viriyangkura (Thailand) T Wongya	21	14	18
Q3	(China) Kang J (China) Sun XL	12	21	21
(Chinese Taipei) Lee J-h (Chinese Taipei) Chen S-y	18	12
7	(Indonesia) E Subaktiar (Indonesia) M Mahmudin	21	21
(Thailand) C Charoenkitamorn (Thailand) C Korepap	18	12
(Chinese Taipei) Lee Y (Chinese Taipei) Yu M-j	21	21
(Vietnam) Pham H N (Vietnam) Le T H	19	11
2	(Indonesia) H Faisal (Indonesia) S D Aulia	21	21

Second Round
Q3	(China) Kang J (China) Sun XL	16	19
7	(Indonesia) E Subaktiar (Indonesia) M Mahmudin	21	21
(Chinese Taipei) Lee Y (Chinese Taipei) Yu M-j	14	17
2	(Indonesia) H Faisal (Indonesia) S D Aulia	21	21

Quarterfinals
7	(Indonesia) E Subaktiar (Indonesia) M Mahmudin	19	16
2	(Indonesia) H Faisal (Indonesia) S D Aulia	21	21

Preceded by 2016 U.S. Open Grand Prix Gold	BWF Grand Prix and Grand Prix Gold; 2016 BWF Season	Succeeded by 2016 Brasil Open Grand Prix
