= 2017 Thailand Masters Grand Prix Gold =

Tournament details
- Dates: 7–12 February 2017
- Level: Grand Prix Gold
- Total prize money: US$120,000
- Venue: Nimibutr Stadium
- Location: Bangkok, Thailand

Champions
- Men's singles: (Indonesia) Tommy Sugiarto
- Women's singles: (Thailand) Busanan Ongbamrungphan
- Men's doubles: (China) Huang Kaixiang (China) Wang Yilu
- Women's doubles: (China) Chen Qingchen (China) Jia Yifan
- Mixed doubles: (China) Zhang Nan (China) Li Yinhui

The 2017 Thailand Masters Grand Prix Gold was the third Grand Prix's badminton tournament of the 2017 BWF Grand Prix Gold and Grand Prix. The tournament was held at the Nimibutr Stadium in Bangkok, Thailand on February 7–12, 2017 and had a total purse of $120,000.

== Men's singles ==
=== Seeds ===
1. (Thailand) Tanongsak Saensomboonsuk (quarterfinals)
2. (China) Huang Yuxiang (third round)
3. (Indonesia) Tommy Sugiarto (champion)
4. (Indonesia) Jonatan Christie (second round)
5. (China) Qiao Bin (withdrew)
6. (Indonesia) Sony Dwi Kuncoro (withdrew)
7. (Chinese Taipei) Hsu Jen-hao (third round)
8. (India) Sameer Verma (first round)
9. (Indonesia) Ihsan Maulana Mustofa (third round)
10. (Indonesia) Anthony Sinisuka Ginting (semifinals)
11. (India) Sourabh Varma (first round)
12. (Malaysia) Liew Daren (withdrew)
13. (China) Zhao Junpeng (quarterfinals)
14. (India) Parupalli Kashyap (withdrew)
15. (Thailand) Khosit Phetpradab (quarterfinals)
16. (Indonesia) Firman Abdul Kholik (third round)

=== Finals ===
Quarterfinals
1	(Thailand) Tanongsak Saensomboonsuk	18	12
(Malaysia) Lee Zii Jia	21	21
(India) Aditya Joshi	12	11
(Thailand) Kantaphon Wangcharoen	21	21
15	(Thailand) Khosit Phetpradab	9	24	17
3	(Indonesia) Tommy Sugiarto	21	22	21
13	(China) Zhao Junpeng	16	16
10	(Indonesia) Anthony Sinisuka Ginting	21	21

Semifinals
(Malaysia) Lee Zii Jia	21	18	20
(Thailand) Kantaphon Wangcharoen	15	21	22
3	(Indonesia) Tommy Sugiarto	16	21	21
10	(Indonesia) Anthony Sinisuka Ginting	21	18	14

Final
(Thailand) Kantaphon Wangcharoen	17	11
3	(Indonesia) Tommy Sugiarto	21	21

=== Top half ===
==== Section 1 ====
First Round
1	(Thailand) T Saensomboonsuk	21	21
(Indonesia) A Marteen	15	17
(Finland) E Heino	17	21	13
Q2	(Thailand) R Oupthong	21	14	21
11	(India) S Verma
Q4	(Indonesia) A Yunanto	w	/	o
(Indonesia) N E Sulistyo	21	19	5
PFQ	(Thailand) C Mekmusik	15	21	21

Second Round
1	(Thailand) T Saensomboonsuk	21	21
Q2	(Thailand) R Oupthong	16	18
Q4	(Indonesia) A Yunanto	21	21
PFQ	(Thailand) C Mekmusik	14	14

Third Round
1	(Thailand) T Saensomboonsuk	21	21
Q4	(Indonesia) A Yunanto	17	14

==== Section 2 ====
First Round
PFQ	(Thailand) K Buarung	15	6
(Malaysia) Lee Z J	21	21
(India) H M.Gowda	9	7
(Thailand) K Vitidsarn	21	21
9	(Indonesia) I M Mustofa	21	21
(Thailand) N Singrueang	11	3
(Thailand) K Atthaviroj	21	21
PFQ	(Thailand) P Sangsomporn	17	17

Second Round
(Malaysia) Lee Z J	21	21
(Thailand) K Vitidsarn	8	9
9	(Indonesia) I M Mustofa	21	21
(Thailand) K Atthaviroj	10	12

Third Round
(Malaysia) Lee Z J	21	21
9	(Indonesia) I M Mustofa	19	14

==== Section 3 ====
First Round
4	(Indonesia) J Christie	21	21
Q5	(Japan) N Yamazawa	12	13
(Thailand) W Phakjarung	12	19
(India) A Joshi	21	21
PFQ	(Thailand) C Sukasem	11	22
(Thailand) K Imnark	21	24
(India) P Joshi	21	21
(Thailand) P Nipornram	12	10

Second Round
4	(Indonesia) J Christie	16	19
(India) A Joshi	21	21
(Thailand) K Imnark	16	21	12
(India) P Joshi	21	16	21

Third Round
(India) A Joshi	21	21
(India) P Joshi	19	10

==== Section 4 ====
First Round
PFQ	(Thailand) S Piyawatcharavijit	5	11
(Thailand) K Wangcharoen	21	21
(Indonesia) F I Hadmadi	22	21
PFQ	(Thailand) P Srimanta	20	15
16	(Indonesia) F A Kholik	21	19	23
(Thailand) S Avihingsanon	13	21	21
Q8	(Thailand) S Jandara	15	12
PFQ	(Thailand) K Yokard	21	21

Second Round
(Thailand) K Wangcharoen	21	21
(Indonesia) F I Hadmadi	10	14
16	(Indonesia) F A Kholik	21	21
PFQ	(Thailand) K Yokard	5	11

Third Round
(Thailand) K Wangcharoen	25	21
16	(Indonesia) F A Kholik	23	12

=== Bottom half ===
==== Section 5 ====
First Round
(Thailand) K Leelavechabutr	21	21
(Indonesia) I S Yulianto	12	11
Q7	(Thailand) K Cheiklinthes	4	13
15	(Thailand) K Phetpradab	21	21
(India) A K Ashok Kumar	21	8	5
(Japan) K Watanabe	18	21	21
Q6	(Thailand) T Keawan	w	/	o
8	(India) S Verma

Second Round
(Thailand) K Leelavechabutr	19	11
15	(Thailand) K Phetpradab	21	21
(Japan) K Watanabe	21	21
Q6	(Thailand) T Keawan	14	14

Third Round
15	(Thailand) K Phetpradab	21	21
(Japan) K Watanabe	12	12

==== Section 6 ====
First Round
(Thailand) T Huansuriya	6	10
(Indonesia) E Sukamta	21	21
(Indonesia) M B Pangisthu	21	21
PFQ	(Thailand) S Jamsri	16	16
(Malaysia) Tan V H	21	17	16
(Thailand) M Narongrit	11	21	21
(Malaysia) Satheishtharan R.	19	15
3	(Indonesia) T Sugiarto	21	21

Second Round
(Indonesia) E Sukamta	11	21	11
(Indonesia) M B Pangisthu	21	13	21
(Thailand) M Narongrit	12	7
3	(Indonesia) T Sugiarto	21	21

Third Round
(Indonesia) M B Pangisthu	12	14
3	(Indonesia) T Sugiarto	21	21

==== Section 7 ====
First Round
Q3	(Thailand) S Chaisin	7	10
(Indonesia) H Kho Wibowo	21	21
(Thailand) K Wanaroon	15	15
13	(China) Zhao JP	21	21
(United States) Y T Chan	12	11
(Thailand) P Thongnuam	21	21
(Thailand) K Laotrakul	14	22	14
7	(Chinese Taipei) Hsu J-h	21	20	21

Second Round
(Indonesia) H Kho Wibowo	15	9
13	(China) Zhao JP	21	21
(Thailand) P Thongnuam	12	19
7	(Chinese Taipei) Hsu J-h	21	21

Third Round
13	(China) Zhao JP	16	21	21
7	(Chinese Taipei) Hsu J-h	21	12	9

==== Section 8 ====
First Round
(Indonesia) V A Saputra	21	21
(India) A Yelegar	8	14
(Thailand) Y Nualnooplong	13	7
10	(Indonesia) A S Ginting	21	21
Q1	(Thailand) N Sawasdivanichakorn	14	16
(Brunei) Jaspar Yu W C	21	21
(Thailand) A Namkul	17	8
2	(China) Huang YX	21	21

Second Round
(Indonesia) V A Saputra	8	13
10	(Indonesia) A S Ginting	21	21
(Brunei) Jaspar Yu W C	2	12
2	(China) Huang YX	21	21

Third Round
10	(Indonesia) A S Ginting	19	21	21
2	(China) Huang YX	21	15	12

== Women's singles ==
=== Seeds ===
1. (Thailand) Busanan Ongbamrungphan (champion)
2. (Thailand) Nitchaon Jindapol (semifinals)
3. (China) Chen Yufei (semifinals)
4. (Japan) Aya Ohori (final)
5. (Singapore) Liang Xiaoyu (quarterfinals)
6. (Malaysia) Soniia Cheah (quarterfinals)
7. (Thailand) Pornpawee Chochuwong (second round)
8. (China) Chen Xiaoxin (quarterfinals)

=== Finals ===
Semifinals
1	(Thailand) Busanan Ongbamrungphan	18	22	21
3	(China) Chen Yufei	21	20	17
4	(Japan) Aya Ohori	21	21
2	(Thailand) Nitchaon Jindapol	16	17

Final
1	(Thailand) Busanan Ongbamrungphan	21	21
4	(Japan) Aya Ohori	18	16

=== Top half ===
==== Section 1 ====
First Round
1	(Thailand) B Ongbamrungphan	21	21
(Japan) N Nidaira	16	17
(China) Gao FJ	24	21
(Thailand) P Chaiwan	22	6
6	(Malaysia) S Cheah	21	21
Q1	(Thailand) T Poopradubsil	13	13
(Thailand) P Chamnaktan	14	16
(Chinese Taipei) Chen S-y	21	21

Second Round
1	(Thailand) B Ongbamrungphan	13	21	21
(China) Gao FJ	21	16	18
6	(Malaysia) S Cheah	21	21
(Chinese Taipei) Chen S-y	19	19

Quarterfinals
1	(Thailand) B Ongbamrungphan	21	21
6	(Malaysia) S Cheah	7	18

==== Section 2 ====
First Round
3	(China) Chen YF	21	21
Q3	(Malaysia) Yap Y	14	16
(Singapore) Yeo J M	21	19	21
(Thailand) C Korepap	12	21	18
7	(Thailand) P Chochuwong	21	16	21
(China) Zhang YM	10	21	18
Q2	(Japan) N Shimoda	17	21	21
(Indonesia) F Angguni	21	11	14

Second Round
3	(China) Chen YF	21	21
(Singapore) Yeo J M	18	7
7	(Thailand) P Chochuwong	17	21	22
Q2	(Japan) N Shimoda	21	19	24

Quarterfinals
3	(China) Chen YF	21	21
Q2	(Japan) N Shimoda	15	11

=== Bottom half ===
==== Section 3 ====
First Round
Q4	(Thailand) S Silprakob	12	13
(Chinese Taipei) Tang W-y	21	21
(Thailand) S Katethong	16	16
8	(China) Chen XX	21	21
(Indonesia) Y Y Susanto	21	21
(Thailand) C Jucharoen	18	10
(Malaysia) Yap R C	13	9
4	(Japan) A Ohori	21	21

Second Round
(Chinese Taipei) Tang W-y	17	11
8	(China) Chen XX	21	21
(Indonesia) Y Y Susanto	16	13
4	(Japan) A Ohori	21	21

Quarterfinals
8	(China) Chen XX	9	12
4	(Japan) A Ohori	21	21

==== Section 4 ====
First Round
(United States) M Chen	13	17
(Thailand) S Suwannakitborihan	21	21
(Chinese Taipei) Hu L-f	5	18
5	(Singapore) Liang XY	21	21
(Thailand) O Jongsathapornparn	15	12
(China) Li WM	21	21
(Indonesia) J Muljati	12	11
2	(Thailand) N Jindapol	21	21

Second Round
(Thailand) S Suwannakitborihan	20	3
5	(Singapore) Liang XY	22	21
(China) Li WM	18	17
2	(Thailand) N Jindapol	21	21

Quarterfinals
5	(Singapore) Liang XY	15	21	14
2	(Thailand) N Jindapol	21	19	21

== Men's doubles ==
=== Seeds ===
1. (Thailand) Bodin Issara / Nipitphon Puangpuapech (withdrew)
2. (Indonesia) Fajar Alfian / Muhammad Rian Ardianto (quarterfinals)
3. (Thailand) Kittinupong Kedren / Dechapol Puavaranukroh (semifinals)
4. (Malaysia) Hoon Thien How / Teo Kok Siang (second round)
5. (Indonesia) Hendra Setiawan / (Malaysia) Tan Boon Heong (second round)
6. (China) Huang Kaixiang / Wang Yilu (champion)
7. (Indonesia) Wahyu Nayaka / Ade Yusuf (second round)
8. (Malaysia) Chooi Kah Ming / Low Juan Shen (quarterfinals)

=== Finals ===
Semifinals
(Chinese Taipei) Lu Ching-yao (Chinese Taipei) Yang Po-han	21	21
(Indonesia) Berry Angriawan (Indonesia) Hardianto	16	17
3	(Thailand) Kittinupong Kedren (Thailand) Dechapol Puavaranukroh	8	17
6	(China) Huang Kaixiang (China) Wang Yilu	21	21

Final
(Chinese Taipei) Lu Ching-yao (Chinese Taipei) Yang Po-han	19	23	16
6	(China) Huang Kaixiang (China) Wang Yilu	21	21	21

=== Top half ===
==== Section 1 ====
First Round
PFQ	(Thailand) K Cheiklinthes (Thailand) P Wannalee	15	9
(Singapore) Terry Hee Y K (Singapore) Loh K H	21	21
(Thailand) K Kolum (Thailand) K Yokard	6	6
(Chinese Taipei) Lu C-y (Chinese Taipei) Yang P-h	21	21
7	(Indonesia) W Nayaka (Indonesia) A Yusuf	21	21
(Thailand) S Anugritayawon (Thailand) P Boontun	12	14
(Thailand) K Tantianankul (Thailand) T Viriyangkura	15	19
(China) Liu C (China) Zhang N	21	21

Second Round
(Singapore) Terry Hee Y K (Singapore) Loh K H	8	14
(Chinese Taipei) Lu C-y (Chinese Taipei) Yang P-h	21	21
7	(Indonesia) W Nayaka (Indonesia) A Yusuf	18	13
(China) Liu C (China) Zhang N	21	21

Quarterfinals
(Chinese Taipei) Lu C-y (Chinese Taipei) Yang P-h	24	21
(China) Liu C (China) Zhang N	22	16

==== Section 2 ====
First Round
4	(Malaysia) Hoon T H (Malaysia) Teo K S	21	16	21
(Thailand) W Sothon (Thailand) N Trinkajee	12	21	9
(Japan) H Okamura (Japan) M Onodera	21	21
(Thailand) T Boonrawd (Thailand) A Chiengwong	13	13
5	(Indonesia) H Setiawan (Malaysia) Tan B H	21	21
(Indonesia) A Barriq (Indonesia) R Dhanriano	16	17
PFQ	(Indonesia) Y S Dasuki (Indonesia) D Juang	21	10	14
(Indonesia) B Angriawan (Indonesia) Hardianto	19	21	21

Second Round
4	(Malaysia) Hoon T H (Malaysia) Teo K S	15	0^{r}
(Japan) H Okamura (Japan) M Onodera	21	0
5	(Indonesia) H Setiawan (Malaysia) Tan B H	21	17	22
(Indonesia) B Angriawan (Indonesia) Hardianto	15	21	24

Quarterfinals
(Japan) H Okamura (Japan) M Onodera	15	16
(Indonesia) B Angriawan (Indonesia) Hardianto	21	21

=== Bottom half ===
==== Section 3 ====
First Round
(Thailand) T Isriyanet (Thailand) K Namdash	21	21
(Indonesia) Y R Sugiarto (Indonesia) A Y Wirawan	17	9
Q4	(Thailand) S Maunglai (Thailand) N Uakoolwarawat	12	10
8	(Malaysia) Chooi K M (Malaysia) Low J S	21	21
(Malaysia) Lee J Y (Malaysia) Lim Z T	15	21	12
(Thailand) T Potieng (Thailand) N Yordphaisong	21	16	21
(Chinese Taipei) Liao K-h (Chinese Taipei) Lu C-p	21	17	20
3	(Thailand) K Kedren (Thailand) D Puavaranukroh	15	21	22

Second Round
(Thailand) T Isriyanet (Thailand) K Namdash	11	11
8	(Malaysia) Chooi K M (Malaysia) Low J S	21	21
(Thailand) T Potieng (Thailand) N Yordphaisong	8	21	17
3	(Thailand) K Kedren (Thailand) D Puavaranukroh	21	19	21

Quarterfinals
8	(Malaysia) Chooi K M (Malaysia) Low J S	18	17
3	(Thailand) K Kedren (Thailand) D Puavaranukroh	21	21

==== Section 4 ====
First Round
(Thailand) W Ampunsuwan (Thailand) I Apisuk	21	21
Q2	(Thailand) W Buranakuea (Thailand) P Thongkham	11	15
Q3	(Thailand) T Topattanakul (Thailand) N Tulamok	7	9
6	(China) Huang KX (China) Wang YL	21	21
(Singapore) D B Chrisnanta (Singapore) H Wijaya	21	21
(Chinese Taipei) Hung Y-y (Chinese Taipei) Liu W-c	19	18
Q1	(Thailand) C Charoenkitamorn (Thailand) S Pol-Gul	11	17
2	(Indonesia) F Alfian (Indonesia) M R Ardianto	21	21

Second Round
(Thailand) W Ampunsuwan (Thailand) I Apisuk	8	21	19
6	(China) Huang KX (China) Wang YL	21	17	21
(Singapore) D B Chrisnanta (Singapore) H Wijaya	13	16
2	(Indonesia) F Alfian (Indonesia) M R Ardianto	21	21

Quarterfinals
6	(China) Huang KX (China) Wang YL	21	21
2	(Indonesia) F Alfian (Indonesia) M R Ardianto	14	13

== Women's doubles ==
=== Seeds ===
1. (China) Chen Qingchen / Jia Yifan (champion)
2. (Thailand) Puttita Supajirakul / Sapsiree Taerattanachai (final)
3. (Thailand) Jongkolphan Kititharakul / Rawinda Prajongjai (first round)
4. (Indonesia) Anggia Shitta Awanda / Ni Ketut Mahadewi Istirani (quarterfinals)
5. (China) Huang Dongping / Li Yinhui (semifinals)
6. (Indonesia) Greysia Polii / Rosyita Eka Putri Sari (semifinals)
7. (Indonesia) Tiara Rosalia Nuraidah / Rizki Amelia Pradipta (quarterfinals)
8. (Indonesia) Della Destiara Haris / Apriani Rahayu (quarterfinals)

=== Finals ===
Semifinals
1	(China) Chen Qingchen (China) Jia Yifan	21	21
6	(Indonesia) Greysia Polii (Indonesia) Rosyita Eka Putri Sari	16	7
5	(China) Huang Dongping (China) Li Yinhui	21	21	14
2	(Thailand) Puttita Supajirakul (Thailand) Sapsiree Taerattanachai	23	17	21

Final
1	(China) Chen Qingchen (China) Jia Yifan	21	21
2	(Thailand) Puttita Supajirakul (Thailand) Sapsiree Taerattanachai	16	15

=== Top half ===
==== Section 1 ====
First Round
1	(China) Chen QC (China) Jia YF	21	21
(Indonesia) C S Ayunidha (Indonesia) M I Tutiharta	4	9
(Thailand) S Chaikittiwat (Thailand) M Loog	15	4
(Indonesia) D Fitriani (Indonesia) N Melati	21	21
8	(Indonesia) D D Haris (Indonesia) A Rahayu	21	21
(Chinese Taipei) Cheng Y-c (Chinese Taipei) Hu L-f	16	17
(Thailand) K Pongpuek (Thailand) S Suppasang	13	21	12
(Indonesia) A M Khasanah (Indonesia) R S Putri	21	17	21

Second Round
1	(China) Chen QC (China) Jia YF	21	21
(Indonesia) D Fitriani (Indonesia) N Melati	13	11
8	(Indonesia) D D Haris (Indonesia) A Rahayu	21	21
(Indonesia) A M Khasanah (Indonesia) R S Putri	10	10

Quarterfinals
1	(China) Chen QC (China) Jia YF	21	21
8	(Indonesia) D D Haris (Indonesia) A Rahayu	18	13

==== Section 2 ====
First Round
3	(Thailand) J Kititharakul (Thailand) R Prajongjai	14	21	16
(China) Bao YX (China) Yu XH	21	8	21
(Thailand) N Saengchote (Thailand) K Sukklad	12	21	14
(Chinese Taipei) Chiang K-h (Chinese Taipei) Hung S-h	21	18	21
6	(Indonesia) G Polii (Indonesia) R E Putri Sari	21	23
(Thailand) C Chaladchalam (Thailand) P Muenwong	14	21
(Thailand) M Bowonwitthanakul (Thailand) P Jatupanaporn	10	14
Q4	(Thailand) P Chamnaktan (Thailand) K Dubthuk	21	21

Second Round
(China) Bao YX (China) Yu XH	21	22
(Chinese Taipei) Chiang K-h (Chinese Taipei) Hung S-h	14	20
6	(Indonesia) G Polii (Indonesia) R E Putri Sari	21	21
Q4	(Thailand) P Chamnaktan (Thailand) K Dubthuk	9	18

Quarterfinals
(China) Bao YX (China) Yu XH	24	21	17
6	(Indonesia) G Polii (Indonesia) R E Putri Sari	22	23	21

=== Bottom half ===
==== Section 3 ====
First Round
(Thailand) S Amitrapai (Thailand) P Chochuwong	21	21
(Indonesia) A F Laili (Indonesia) A P L Variella	9	10
(Thailand) R Laisuan (Thailand) S Mingchua	21	8	8
5	(China) Huang DP (China) Li YH	16	21	21
(Thailand) N Chatupornkarnchana (Thailand) S Chumnibannakarn	20	21	21
(Chinese Taipei) Chen S-y (Chinese Taipei) Tang W-y	22	18	14
(Chinese Taipei) Lin X-m (Chinese Taipei) Wu F-c	18	21	12
4	(Indonesia) A S Awanda (Indonesia) N K M Istirani	21	18	21

Second Round
(Thailand) S Amitrapai (Thailand) P Chochuwong	21	13	7
5	(China) Huang DP (China) Li YH	14	21	21
(Thailand) N Chatupornkarnchana (Thailand) S Chumnibannakarn	6	12
4	(Indonesia) A S Awanda (Indonesia) N K M Istirani	21	21

Quarterfinals
5	(China) Huang DP (China) Li YH	16	21	0
4	(Indonesia) A S Awanda (Indonesia) N K M Istirani	21	16	0^{r}

==== Section 4 ====
First Round
Q2	(Thailand) S Paewsampran (Thailand) K Sudjaipraparat	19	21	21
(Thailand) T Kaweenuntavong (Thailand) S Suwannakitborihan	21	7	16
(Thailand) A Povanon (Thailand) N Promdej	6	9
7	(Indonesia) T R Nuraidah (Indonesia) R A Pradipta	21	21
Q3	(Japan) E Honda (Japan) N Shimizu	21	21
(Thailand) F Loog (Thailand) W Patimon	11	15
Q1	(Thailand) S Chueboca (Thailand) T Thamnopakao	8	6
2	(Thailand) P Supajirakul (Thailand) S Taerattanachai	21	21

Second Round
Q2	(Thailand) S Paewsampran (Thailand) K Sudjaipraparat	14	15
7	(Indonesia) T R Nuraidah (Indonesia) R A Pradipta	21	21
Q3	(Japan) E Honda (Japan) N Shimizu	8	10
2	(Thailand) P Supajirakul (Thailand) S Taerattanachai	21	21

Quarterfinals
7	(Indonesia) T R Nuraidah (Indonesia) R A Pradipta	14	14
2	(Thailand) P Supajirakul (Thailand) S Taerattanachai	21	21

== Mixed doubles ==
=== Seeds ===
1. (Thailand) Bodin Isara / Savitree Amitrapai (withdrew)
2. (Thailand) Dechapol Puavaranukroh / Sapsiree Taerattanachai (final)
3. (Indonesia) Ronald Alexander / Melati Daeva Oktavianti (second round)
4. (Singapore) Terry Hee Yong Kai / Tan Wei Han (semifinals)
5. (China) Zhang Nan / Li Yinhui (champion)
6. (Indonesia) Tontowi Ahmad / Gloria Emanuelle Widjaja (withdrew)
7. (Indonesia) Alfian Eko Prasetya / Annisa Saufika (semifinals)
8. (Thailand) Nipitphon Puangpuapech / Jongkolphan Kititharakul (first round)

=== Finals ===
Semifinals
5	(China) Zhang Nan (China) Li Yinhui	20
7	(Indonesia) Alfian Eko Prasetya (Indonesia) Annisa Saufika	20^{r}
4	(Singapore) Terry Hee Yong Kai (Singapore) Tan Wei Han	15	16
2	(Thailand) Dechapol Puavaranukroh (Thailand) Sapsiree Taerattanachai	21	21

Final
5	(China) Zhang Nan (China) Li Yinhui	21	20	21
2	(Thailand) Dechapol Puavaranukroh (Thailand) Sapsiree Taerattanachai	11	22	13

=== Top half ===
==== Section 1 ====
First Round
PFQ	(Indonesia) A Y Wirawan (Indonesia) N Melati	21	21
(Indonesia) H Tandjaya (Indonesia) C S Ayunidha	10	11
(Thailand) C Charoenkitamorn (Thailand) C Korepap	21	21
(Indonesia) J S Dartagnan (Indonesia) A M Khasabah	12	7
5	(China) Zhang N (China) Li YH	21	21
PFQ	(Thailand) P Worasaktayanan (Thailand) R Laisuan	14	13
(Thailand) T Viriyangkura (Thailand) A Sapniti	21	15	21
(Indonesia) Y R Sugiarto (Indonesia) D Fitriani	18	21	16

Second Round
PFQ	(Indonesia) A Y Wirawan (Indonesia) N Melati	21	21
(Thailand) C Charoenkitamorn (Thailand) C Korepap	14	12
5	(China) Zhang N (China) Li YH	21	0
(Thailand) T Viriyangkura (Thailand) A Sapniti	14	0^{r}

Quarterfinals
PFQ	(Indonesia) A Y Wirawan (Indonesia) N Melati	7	14
5	(China) Zhang N (China) Li YH	21	21

==== Section 2 ====
First Round
3	(Indonesia) R Alexander (Indonesia) M D Oktavianti	21	21
(Thailand) T Isriyanet (Thailand) P Chochuwong	18	19
(Indonesia) D Juang (Indonesia) K N Hanadia	11	8
(Thailand) S Jomkoh (Thailand) P Supajirakul	21	21
7	(Indonesia) A E Prasetya (Indonesia) A Saufika	21	21
(Chinese Taipei) Liu W-c (Chinese Taipei) Cheng Y-c	13	12
Q2	(Thailand) M Narongrit (Thailand) S Katethong	21	21
Q4	(Thailand) W Sarapat (Thailand) F Loog	11	12

Second Round
3	(Indonesia) R Alexander (Indonesia) M D Oktavianti	19	20
(Thailand) S Jomkoh (Thailand) P Supajirakul	21	22
7	(Indonesia) A E Prasetya (Indonesia) A Saufika	21	13	21
Q2	(Thailand) M Narongrit (Thailand) S Katethong	16	21	15

Quarterfinals
(Thailand) S Jomkoh (Thailand) P Supajirakul	17	18
7	(Indonesia) A E Prasetya (Indonesia) A Saufika	21	21

=== Bottom half ===
==== Section 3 ====
First Round
(Chinese Taipei) Lu C-y (Chinese Taipei) Hu L-f	21	21
Q3	(Thailand) P Thongkham (Thailand) K Sukklad	12	14
(Thailand) P Thongnuam (Thailand) N Saengchote	16	24	19
PFQ	(Thailand) N Yordphaisong (Thailand) R Prajongjai	21	22	21
(United States) Y T Chan (United States) Y Kawasaki	21	21
(Thailand) N Sattanako (Thailand) S Mingchua	15	16
(Indonesia) A Yunanto (Indonesia) S N Azisah	15	9
4	(Singapore) Terry Hee Y K (Singapore) Tan W H	21	21

Second Round
(Chinese Taipei) Lu C-y (Chinese Taipei) Hu L-f	16	21	21
PFQ	(Thailand) N Yordphaisong (Thailand) R Prajongjai	21	17	15
(United States) Y T Chan (United States) Y Kawasaki	3	9
4	(Singapore) Terry Hee Y K (Singapore) Tan W H	21	21

Quarterfinals
(Chinese Taipei) Lu C-y (Chinese Taipei) Hu L-f	19	9
4	(Singapore) Terry Hee Y K (Singapore) Tan W H	21	21

==== Section 4 ====
First Round
(Chinese Taipei) Yang P-h (Chinese Taipei) Hung S-h	21	21
Q1	(Thailand) S Maunglai (Thailand) N Chatupornkarnchana	11	7
(Indonesia) Y E Saputra (Indonesia) M G Islami	5	21	21
8	(Thailand) N Puangpuapech (Thailand) J Kititharakul	21	19	19
(Chinese Taipei) Hung Y-y (Chinese Taipei) Lin X-m	15	15
(China) Wang YL (China) Huang DP	21	21
(Indonesia) T Wardhana (Indonesia) A P L Variella	3	17
2	(Thailand) D Puavaranukroh (Thailand) S Taerattanachai	21	21

Second Round
(Chinese Taipei) Yang P-h (Chinese Taipei) Hung S-h	21	21
(Indonesia) Y E Saputra (Indonesia) M G Islami	9	17
(China) Wang YL (China) Huang DP	16	11
2	(Thailand) D Puavaranukroh (Thailand) S Taerattanachai	21	21

Quarterfinals
(Chinese Taipei) Yang P-h (Chinese Taipei) Hung S-h	13	17
2	(Thailand) D Puavaranukroh (Thailand) S Taerattanachai	21	21

Preceded by 2017 Syed Modi International Grand Prix Gold	BWF Grand Prix Gold and Grand Prix; 2017 BWF Season	Succeeded by 2017 German Open Grand Prix Gold
