= 2012 Asian Junior Badminton Championships – Boys doubles =

Tournament details
- Dates: 3 – 7 July 2012
- Edition: 15
- Venue: Gimcheon Indoor Stadium
- Location: Gimcheon, South Korea

The Boys' Doubles tournament of the 2012 Asian Junior Badminton Championships was held from July 3–7 in Gimcheon, South Korea. The defending champion of the last edition were Lin Chia-yu and Huang Po-jui from Chinese Taipei. The bronze medals goes to the first seeded Lee Chun Hei / Ng Ka Long of Hong Kong and unseeded players Alfian Eko Prasetya / Kevin Sanjaya Sukamuljo of Indonesia, after defeated in the semifinals round. Another Indonesian pair Arya Maulana Aldiartama / Edi Subaktiar emerged as the champion after beat Wang Chi-lin / Wu Hsiao-lin of Chinese Taipei in the finals with the score 17–21, 22–20, 21–10.

== Seeded ==
1. (Hong Kong) Lee Chun Hei / Ng Ka Long (semi-final)
2. (Indonesia) Hafiz Faizal / Putra Eka Rhoma (third round)
3. (Malaysia) Calvin Ong Jia Hong / Tan Wee Gieen (second round)
4. (Indonesia) Arya Maulana Aldiartama / Edi Subaktiar (champion)
5. (Malaysia) Darren Isaac Devadass / Tai An Khang (quarter-final)
6. (India) Hemanagendra Babu / Gopi Raju Geovani (second round)
7. (Malaysia) Muhammad Aliff Nurizwan / Muhamad Akmal Zakaria (second round)
8. (South Korea) Choi Sol-gyu / Park Se-woong (quarter-final)

== Draw ==
=== Finals ===
Quarterfinals
1	(Hong Kong) Lee Chun Hei (Hong Kong) Ng Ka Long	21	21
5	(Malaysia) Darren Isaac Devadass (Malaysia) Tai An Khang	13	15
4	(Indonesia) Arya Maulana Aldiartama (Indonesia) Edi Subaktiar	21	21
(Chinese Taipei) Tien Tzu-chieh (Chinese Taipei) Yang Po-han	19	14
8	(South Korea) Choi Sol-gyu (South Korea) Park Se-woong	18	16
(Indonesia) Alfian Eko Prasetya (Indonesia) Kevin Sanjaya Sukamuljo	21	21
(Chinese Taipei) Wang Chi-lin (Chinese Taipei) Wu Hsiao-lin	21	15	21
(Japan) Takuto Inoue (Japan) Yuki Kaneko	14	21	11

Semifinals
1	(Hong Kong) Lee Chun Hei (Hong Kong) Ng Ka Long	21	24	15
4	(Indonesia) Arya Maulana Aldiartama (Indonesia) Edi Subaktiar	15	26	21
(Indonesia) Alfian Eko Prasetya (Indonesia) Kevin Sanjaya Sukamuljo	20	13
(Chinese Taipei) Wang Chi-lin (Chinese Taipei) Wu Hsiao-lin	22	21

Final
4	(Indonesia) Arya Maulana Aldiartama (Indonesia) Edi Subaktiar	17	22	21
(Chinese Taipei) Wang Chi-lin (Chinese Taipei) Wu Hsiao-lin	21	20	10

=== Top Half ===
==== Section 1 ====
First round	Second round					Third round
	1	(Hong Kong) Lee C H (Hong Kong) Ng K L	21	21
		(Vietnam) Ngo X T (Vietnam) Pham C C	14	6
						1	(Hong Kong) Lee C H (Hong Kong) Ng K L	21	21
							(India) S Ravuri (India) B Venkatesh	12	15
		(India) S Ravuri (India) B Venkatesh	14	21	21
		(Iran) F Khanjani (Iran) S Sadeghi	21	8	11

==== Section 2 ====
First round
(South Korea) Kim D-t (South Korea) Kim Y-c	11	21	14
(Chinese Taipei) Chen W (Chinese Taipei) Liu W-c	21	16	21

Second round
5	(Malaysia) D I Devadass (Malaysia) Tai A K	21	21
(Japan) K Matsui (Japan) K Miura	19	19
(Thailand) S Ampanporn (Thailand) T Thawornwong	18	14
(Chinese Taipei) Chen W (Chinese Taipei) Liu W-c	21	21

Third round
5	(Malaysia) D I Devadass (Malaysia) Tai A K	21	18	21
(Chinese Taipei) Chen W (Chinese Taipei) Liu W-c	14	21	19

==== Section 3 ====
First round
(Sri Lanka) P L Ambegoda (Sri Lanka) P K Hettiarachchi	13	12
(South Korea) Ra M-y (South Korea) Ryu S-h	21	21

Second round
4	(Indonesia) A M Aldiartama (Indonesia) E Subaktiar	21	21
(Turkmenistan) A Nyyazgulyyev (Turkmenistan) P Sopyyev	3	2
(Singapore) M A Ishak (Singapore) L Teng	15	15
(South Korea) Ra M-y (South Korea) Ryu S-h	21	21

Third round
4	(Indonesia) A M Aldiartama (Indonesia) E Subaktiar	21	21
(South Korea) Ra M-y (South Korea) Ryu S-h	13	15

==== Section 4 ====
First round
(Macau) Lei I M (Macau) Lou H M	2	8
(China) Pei TY (China) Wang YL	21	21

Second round
7	(Malaysia) M A Nurizwan (Malaysia) M A Zakaria	9	8
(South Korea) Bae K-y (South Korea) Jun B-c	21	21
(Chinese Taipei) Tien T-c (Chinese Taipei) Yang P-h	21	21
(China) Pei TY (China) Wang YL	12	19

Third round
(South Korea) Bae K-y (South Korea) Jun B-c	13	17
(Chinese Taipei) Tien T-c (Chinese Taipei) Yang P-h	21	21

=== Bottom Half ===
==== Section 5 ====
First round
(China) Li JH (China) Zhang NY	21	21
(Bangladesh) M A Hossain (Bangladesh) A Jaman	3	14

Second round
(China) Li JH (China) Zhang NY	21	21
(Singapore) B Ong (Singapore) Tan M S	15	14
(Japan) Y Kobayashi (Japan) A Koga	24	10	12
8	(South Korea) Choi S-g (South Korea) Park S-w	22	21	21

Third round
(China) Li JH (China) Zhang NY	15	15
8	(South Korea) Choi S-g (South Korea) Park S-w	21	21

==== Section 6 ====
First round
(Sri Lanka) M Vibhavi (Sri Lanka) D B Yatawara	12	6
(Hong Kong) Lee C Y (Hong Kong) Tang C M	21	21

Second round
(Hong Kong) Lee C Y (Hong Kong) Tang C M	21	21
(Mongolia) B Munkhbat (Mongolia) E Purevsuren	5	6
(Indonesia) A E Prasetya (Indonesia) K S Sukamuljo	21	21
3	(Malaysia) C Ong (Malaysia) Tan W G	5	15

Third round
(Hong Kong) Lee C Y (Hong Kong) Tang C M	20	10
(Indonesia) A E Prasetya (Indonesia) K S Sukamuljo	22	21

==== Section 7 ====
First round
(Chinese Taipei) Wang C-l (Chinese Taipei) Wu H-l	21	18	21
(Vietnam) Do T D (Vietnam) Pham H N	12	21	11

Second round
(Chinese Taipei) Wang C-l (Chinese Taipei) Wu H-l	21	21
(Thailand) P Bowornwatanuwong (Thailand) N Kitphaibool	15	15
(South Korea) Kim J-h (South Korea) Kim J-h	21	21
6	(India) H Babu (India) G R Geovani	18	16

Third round
(Chinese Taipei) Wang C-l (Chinese Taipei) Wu H-l	21	21
(South Korea) Kim J-h (South Korea) Kim J-h	15	19

==== Section 8 ====
First round
(China) Liu YC (China) Shi LF	17	17
(Japan) T Inoue (Japan) Y Kaneko	21	21

Second round
(Japan) T Inoue (Japan) Y Kaneko	21	21
(Uzbekistan) B Appakhodjaev (Uzbekistan) A Savatyugin	8	6
(Hong Kong) Law C H (Hong Kong) Or C C	10	15
2	(Indonesia) H Faizal (Indonesia) P E Rhoma	21	21

Third round
(Japan) T Inoue (Japan) Y Kaneko	18	23	21
2	(Indonesia) H Faizal (Indonesia) P E Rhoma	21	21	9
