= 2016 Macau Open Grand Prix Gold =

Tournament details
- Dates: 29 November 2016 – 4 December 2016
- Level: Grand Prix Gold
- Total prize money: US$120,000
- Venue: Tap Seac Multisport Pavilion Macau
- Location: Macau

Champions
- Men's singles: (China) Zhao Junpeng
- Women's singles: (China) Chen Yufei
- Men's doubles: (Chinese Taipei) Lee Jhe-huei (Chinese Taipei) Lee Yang
- Women's doubles: (China) Chen Qingchen (China) Jia Yifan
- Mixed doubles: (China) Zhang Nan (China) Li Yinhui

The 2016 Macau Open Grand Prix Gold will be the 21st grand prix's badminton tournament of the 2016 BWF Grand Prix Gold and Grand Prix. The tournament was held at Tap Seac Multisport Pavilion Macau in Macau from 29 November to 4 December 2016 and had a total purse of $120,000.

== Men's singles ==
=== Seeds ===
1. (Chinese Taipei) Chou Tien-chen (final)
2. (Hong Kong) Ng Ka Long (withdrew)
3. (India) Srikanth Kidambi (withdrew)
4. (Hong Kong) Hu Yun (second round)
5. (Hong Kong) Wong Wing Ki (third round)
6. (Chinese Taipei) Wang Tzu-wei (semifinals)
7. (India) H. S. Prannoy (first round)
8. (Hong Kong) Wei Nan (second round)

=== Finals ===
Quarterfinals
1	(Chinese Taipei) Chou Tien-chen	21	21
(Indonesia) Muhammad Bayu Pangisthu	11	12
(China) Huang Yuxiang	21	13	21
(Chinese Taipei) Lin Yu-hsien	10	21	16
6	(Chinese Taipei) Wang Tzu-wei	21	21
(Malaysia) Chong Wei Feng	13	17
(India) B. Sai Praneeth	19	9
(China) Zhao Junpeng	21	21

Semifinals
1	(Chinese Taipei) Chou Tien-chen	21	21
(China) Huang Yuxiang	13	19
6	(Chinese Taipei) Wang Tzu-wei	21	12	11
(China) Zhao Junpeng	17	21	21

Final
1	(Chinese Taipei) Chou Tien-chen	11	19
(China) Zhao Junpeng	21	21

=== Top half ===
==== Section 1 ====
First round
1	(Chinese Taipei) Chou T-c
BYE
(Macau) Ho W H	4	4
(China) Guo K	21	21
(Indonesia) S D Kuncoro
(Malaysia) Lew M H	w	/	o
(Macau) Pui P F	10	7
(China) Zhu SY	21	21

Second round
1	(Chinese Taipei) Chou T-c	21	21	21
(China) Guo K	23	17	14
(Malaysia) Lew M H
(China) Zhu SY	w	/	o

Third round
1	(Chinese Taipei) Chou T-c	21	21
(China) Zhu SY	16	17

==== Section 2 ====
First round
8	(Hong Kong) Wei N
BYE
(Malaysia) Liew D	25	19	21
(Hong Kong) Lee C W	23	21	15
(India) S Verma	21	21
(Czech Republic) M Ludík	11	16
(Malaysia) Z Zulkiffli
(Indonesia) M B Pangisthu	w	/	o

Second round
8	(Hong Kong) Wei N	13	15
(Malaysia) Liew D	21	21
(India) S Verma	18	13
(Indonesia) M B Pangisthu	21	21

Third round
(Malaysia) Liew D	13	21	15
(Indonesia) M B Pangisthu	21	17	21

==== Section 3 ====
First round
4	(Hong Kong) Hu Y
BYE
(Hong Kong) Chan Y C	8	18
(Indonesia) F A Kholik	21	21
(England) T Penty	21	21
(Indonesia) F I Hadmadi	16	15
(China) Huang YX	21	21
(Indonesia) E Septian	6	7

Second round
4	(Hong Kong) Hu Y	17	7
(Indonesia) F A Kholik	21	21
(England) T Penty	12	18
(China) Huang YX	21	21

Third round
(Indonesia) F A Kholik	12	18
(China) Huang YX	21	21

==== Section 4 ====
First round
7	(India) H. S. Prannoy	2^{r}
(Chinese Taipei) Chen C-w	6
(Malaysia) Sim G Z
(India) P Kashyap	w	/	o
(Chinese Taipei) Lin Y-h	21	21
(Macau) Vong K W	6	8
(Indonesia) A Marteen	21	21
(Malaysia) M A Abdul Latif	16	19

Second round
(Chinese Taipei) Chen C-w	19	8
(India) P Kashyap	21	21
(Chinese Taipei) Lin Y-h	21	21
(Indonesia) A Marteen	15	13

Third round
(India) P Kashyap	13	20
(Chinese Taipei) Lin Y-h	21	22

=== Bottom half ===
==== Section 5 ====
First round
(Indonesia) N E Sulistyo	5	8
(Chinese Taipei) Shih K-c	21	21
(Malaysia) Tan C S	21	21
(Macau) Ao F L	14	16
(Chinese Taipei) Chu H-c	11	21
(Indonesia) H K Wibowo	21	23
(Hong Kong) Lee C Y	20	14
6	(Chinese Taipei) Wang T-w	22	21

Second round
(Chinese Taipei) Shih K-c	11	7
(Malaysia) Tan C S	21	21
(Indonesia) H K Wibowo	19	21	9
6	(Chinese Taipei) Wang T-w	21	14	21

Third round
(Malaysia) Tan C S	19	10
6	(Chinese Taipei) Wang T-w	21	21

==== Section 6 ====
First round
(Portugal) R Mendes	6	9
(Chinese Taipei) Lin C-h	21	21
(China) Xue S
(Indonesia) A S Ginting	w	/	o
(Malaysia) Chong W F	21	21
(Indonesia) E Sukamta	17	12
BYE
3	(India) K Srikanth

Second round
(Chinese Taipei) Lin C-h	13	7
(Indonesia) A S Ginting	21	21
(Malaysia) Chong W F	w	/	o
3	(India) K Srikanth

Third round
(Indonesia) A S Ginting	17	21	18
(Malaysia) Chong W F	21	19	21

==== Section 7 ====
First round
(Indonesia) I M Mustofa	20	19
(China) Sun FX	22	21
(Macau) Lam H H	3	8
(India) B. S Praneeth	21	21
(Malaysia) I Z Zainuddin	21	21
(United States) H L Lee	17	19
BYE
5	(Hong Kong) Wong W K

Second round
(China) Sun FX	12	15
(India) B. S Praneeth	21	21
(Malaysia) I Z Zainuddin	8	23	19
5	(Hong Kong) Wong W K	21	21	21

Third round
(India) B. S Praneeth	21	21
5	(Hong Kong) Wong W K	15	17

==== Section 8 ====
First round
(Indonesia) A Yunanto	16	18
(China) Zhao JP	21	21
(Chinese Taipei) Hsueh H-y	21	21
(Egypt) A A E Khateeb	5	6
(Brunei) Yu W C
(Malaysia) Yeoh K E	w	/	o
BYE
2	(Hong Kong) Ng K L

Second round
(China) Zhao JP	21	21
(Chinese Taipei) Hsueh H-y	19	12
(Malaysia) Yeoh K E	w	/	o
2	(Hong Kong) Ng K L

Third round
(China) Zhao JP	21	21
(Malaysia) Yeoh K E	9	15

== Women's singles ==
=== Seeds ===
1. (India) Saina Nehwal (quarterfinals)
2. (India) P. V. Sindhu (withdrew)
3. (Hong Kong) Cheung Ngan Yi (semifinals)
4. (Chinese Taipei) Hsu Ya-ching (first round)
5. (Malaysia) Tee Jing Yi (second round)
6. (China) Chen Yufei (champion)
7. (Singapore) Liang Xiaoyu (quarterfinals)
8. (Hong Kong) Yip Pui Yin (first round)

=== Finals ===
Semifinals
(China) Zhang Yiman	16	12
6	(China) Chen Yufei	21	21
3	(Hong Kong) Cheung Ngan Yi	11	17
(China) Chen Xiaoxin	21	21

Final
6	(China) Chen Yufei	21	21
(China) Chen Xiaoxin	13	18

=== Top half ===
==== Section 1 ====
First round
1	(India) S Nehwal	21	21	21
(Indonesia) H Ramadini	23	14	18
(Indonesia) D D Ayustine	21	21
(Hong Kong) Tsang W C	19	11
8	(Hong Kong) Yip P Y	19	14
Q4	(Chinese Taipei) Tang W-y	21	21
PFQ	(Chinese Taipei) Liang T-y	14	18
(China) Zhang YM	21	21

Second round
1	(India) S Nehwal	17	21	21
(Indonesia) D D Ayustine	21	18	12
Q4	(Chinese Taipei) Tang W-y	14	10
(China) Zhang YM	21	21

Quarterfinals
1	(India) S Nehwal	12	17
(China) Zhang YM	21	21

==== Section 2 ====
First round
4	(Chinese Taipei) Hsu Y-c	23	21	11
(Malaysia) Goh J W	25	17	21
(Indonesia) R A Riodingin	21	21
(Chinese Taipei) Hung S-h	19	18
6	(China) Chen YF	21	21
PFQ	(Indonesia) J Muljati	9	17
(Chinese Taipei) Lee C-h	21	8	15
(Indonesia) Fitriani	18	21	21

Second round
(Malaysia) Goh J W	21	11
(Indonesia) R A Riodingin	10	1^{r}
6	(China) Chen YF	21	24
(Indonesia) Fitriani	13	22

Quarterfinals
(Malaysia) Goh J W	14	10
6	(China) Chen YF	21	21

=== Bottom half ===
==== Section 3 ====
First round
(Malaysia) Ho Y M	21	13	21
(China) Cai YY	13	21	23
Q3	(Indonesia) A Syafitri Nur	6	3
7	(Singapore) Liang XY	21	21
(Hong Kong) Cheung Y M	12	12
(Chinese Taipei) Chiang M-h	21	21
(Indonesia) Y Y Susanto	14	10
3	(Hong Kong) Cheung N Y	21	21

Second round
(China) Cai YY	13	7
7	(Singapore) Liang XY	21	21
(Chinese Taipei) Chiang M-h	11	12
3	(Hong Kong) Cheung N Y	21	21

Quarterfinals
7	(Singapore) Liang XY	17	14
3	(Hong Kong) Cheung N Y	21	21

==== Section 4 ====
First round
Q1	(Macau) Kuan C L	2	4
(China) Chen XX	21	21
PFQ	(Indonesia) E Kurnianti	12	10
5	(Malaysia) Tee J Y	21	21
Q2	(Indonesia) D R Vehrenica	12	7
(Chinese Taipei) Chen S-y	21	21
(China) Han Y	21	21
PFQ	(Hong Kong) Fan K Y	9	10

Second round
(China) Chen XX	21	21
5	(Malaysia) Tee J Y	17	19
(Chinese Taipei) Chen S-y	8	10
(China) Han Y	21	21

Quarterfinals
(China) Chen XX	21	21
(China) Han Y	15	16

== Men's doubles ==
=== Seeds ===
1. (Chinese Taipei) Chen Hung-ling / Wang Chi-lin (quarterfinals)
2. (Chinese Taipei) Lee Jhe-huei / Lee Yang (champion)
3. (India) Manu Attri / B. Sumeeth Reddy (second round)
4. (Indonesia) Fajar Alfian / Muhammad Rian Ardianto (semifinals)
5. (China) Lu Kai / Zhang Nan (final)
6. (Indonesia) Wahyu Nayaka / Giovani Dicky Oktavan (first round)
7. (Chinese Taipei) Lu Ching-yao / Yang Po-han (quarterfinals)
8. (Indonesia) Hardianto / Kenas Adi Haryanto (semifinals)

=== Finals ===
Semifinals

Final

5
- (China) Lu Kai
- (China) Zhang Nan
21
21

4
(Indonesia) Fajar Alfian
(Indonesia) Muhammad Rian Ardianto
13
15

5
- (China) Lu Kai
- (China) Zhang Nan
21
18
19

2
- (Chinese Taipei) Lee Jhe-huei
- (Chinese Taipei) Lee Yang
17
21
21

8
(Indonesia) Hardianto
(Indonesia) Kenas Adi Haryanto
19
18

2
- (Chinese Taipei) Lee Jhe-huei
- (Chinese Taipei) Lee Yang
21
21

=== Top half ===
==== Section 1 ====
First round

Second round

Quarterfinals

1
- (Chinese Taipei) Chen H-l
- (Chinese Taipei) Wang C-l
21
21

- (Macau) Lam H H
- (Macau) Pui P F
7
6

1
- (Chinese Taipei) Chen H-l
- (Chinese Taipei) Wang C-l
21
21

- (Hong Kong) Law C H
- (Hong Kong) Lee C H
11
19

- (Malaysia) Chow P C
- (Malaysia) Yeoh K E
10
13

- (Hong Kong) Law C H
- (Hong Kong) Lee C H
21
21

1
- (Chinese Taipei) Chen H-l
- (Chinese Taipei) Wang C-l
22
15
19

5
- (China) Lu K
- (China) Zhang N
20
21
21

5
- (China) Lu K
- (China) Zhang N
21
21

- (Chinese Taipei) Lee S-m
- (Chinese Taipei) Lin C-y
17
14

5
- (China) Lu K
- (China) Zhang N
25
21

- (Malaysia) Ong Y S
- (Malaysia) Teo E Y
23
17

- (Hong Kong) Mak H C
- (Hong Kong) Yeung S C
21
16

- (Malaysia) Ong Y S
- (Malaysia) Teo E Y
23
21

==== Section 2 ====
First round

Second round

Quarterfinals

4
- (Indonesia) F Alfian
- (Indonesia) M R Ardianto
21
21

- (China) Yu XY
- (China) Zhang W
15
13

4
- (Indonesia) F Alfian
- (Indonesia) M R Ardianto
21
21

PFQ
- (Hong Kong) Ho W L
- (Hong Kong) Tam C H
14
14

PFQ
- (Hong Kong) Ho W L
- (Hong Kong) Tam C H
17
21
21

- (Indonesia) Hantoro
- (Indonesia) F Kurniawan
21
9
19

4
- (Indonesia) F Alfian
- (Indonesia) M R Ardianto
16
21
21

7
- (Chinese Taipei) Lu C-y
- (Chinese Taipei) Yang P-h
21
14
18

7
- (Chinese Taipei) Lu C-y
- (Chinese Taipei) Yang P-h
21
21

(Singapore) Terry Hee Y K
(Singapore) Loh H K
10
13

7
- (Chinese Taipei) Lu C-y
- (Chinese Taipei) Yang P-h
20
21
21

- (Indonesia) H A Gunawan
- (Indonesia) M Kido
22
9
12

- (Indonesia) H A Gunawan
- (Indonesia) M Kido
21
21

- (Philippines) C A Cayanan
- (Philippines) P J Escueta
18
18

=== Bottom half ===
==== Section 3 ====
First round
Q1	(Indonesia) H Bl (Indonesia) H Rumungan	13	15
(Hong Kong) Chan T K (Hong Kong) Chan T K	21	21
Q3	(Indonesia) S Asitha (Indonesia) E Septian	16	16
8	(Indonesia) Hardianto (Indonesia) K A Haryanto	21	21
(Singapore) D B Chrisnanta (Singapore) H Wijaya	w	/	o
(Indonesia) N E Sulistyo (Brunei) Yu W C
(Hong Kong) Chan Y L (Hong Kong) Li K H	11	21	9
3	(India) M Attri (India) B. S Reddy	21	17	21

Second round
(Hong Kong) Chan T K (Hong Kong) Chan T K	14	14
8	(Indonesia) Hardianto (Indonesia) K A Haryanto	21	21
(Singapore) D B Chrisnanta (Singapore) H Wijaya	22	21
3	(India) M Attri (India) B. S Reddy	20	19

Quarterfinals
8	(Indonesia) Hardianto (Indonesia) K A Haryanto	19	21	21
(Singapore) D B Chrisnanta (Singapore) H Wijaya	21	12	9

==== Section 4 ====
First round

Second round

Quarterfinals

- (Hong Kong) Or C C
- (Hong Kong) Tang C M
21
21

Q2
(Chinese Taipei) Liu W-c
(Chinese Taipei) Tseng M-h
12
13

- (Hong Kong) Or C C
- (Hong Kong) Tang C M
22
21

- (Malaysia) Hoon T H
- (Malaysia) Teo K S
20
16

- (Malaysia) Hoon T H
- (Malaysia) Teo K S
12
21
21

6
- (Indonesia) W Nayaka
- (Indonesia) G D Oktavan
21
15
17

- (Hong Kong) Or C C
- (Hong Kong) Tang C M
21
17
19

2
- (Chinese Taipei) Lee J-h
- (Chinese Taipei) Lee Y
11
21
21

- (Chinese Taipei) Lin C-h
- (Chinese Taipei) Lin C-h
20
21
11

- (Malaysia) Lim K W
- (Malaysia) Ong J G
22
13
21

- (Malaysia) Lim K W
- (Malaysia) Ong J G
22
16
10

2
- (Chinese Taipei) Lee J-h
- (Chinese Taipei) Lee Y
20
21
21

- (Egypt) A A El Khateeb
- (Egypt) A Kashkal
9
11

2
- (Chinese Taipei) Lee J-h
- (Chinese Taipei) Lee Y
21
21

== Women's doubles ==
=== Seeds ===
1. (China) Chen Qingchen / Jia Yifan (champion)
2. (Malaysia) Vivian Hoo Kah Mun / Woon Khe Wei (semifinals)
3. (Indonesia) Della Destiara Haris / Rosyita Eka Putri Sari (second round)
4. (Bulgaria) Gabriela Stoeva / Stefani Stoeva (withdrew)

=== Finals ===
Semifinals

Final

1
- (China) Chen Qingchen
- (China) Jia Yifan
21
21

- (Malaysia) Chow Mei Kuan
- (Malaysia) Lee Meng Yean
15
9

1
- (China) Chen Qingchen
- (China) Jia Yifan
21
21

- (Indonesia) Anggia Shitta Awanda
15
13

- (Indonesia) Anggia Shitta Awanda
13
21
21

2
(Malaysia) Vivian Hoo Kah Mun
(Malaysia) Woon Khe Wei
21
19
10

=== Top half ===
==== Section 1 ====
First round

Second round

Quarterfinals

1
- (China) Chen QC
- (China) Jia YF

BYE

1
- (China) Chen QC
- (China) Jia YF
21
21

- (Chinese Taipei) Chen S-y
- (Chinese Taipei) Kuo Y-w
16
13

- (Hong Kong) Ng W Y
- (Hong Kong) Yuen S Y
13
21
13

- (Chinese Taipei) Chen S-y
- (Chinese Taipei) Kuo Y-w
21
17
21

1
- (China) Chen QC
- (China) Jia YF
21
21

- (Indonesia) W Anggraini
5
11

- (Indonesia) W Anggraini

BYE

- (Indonesia) W Anggraini
22
21

- (Indonesia) K N Hanadia
20
19

- (Indonesia) K N Hanadia
21
21

- (Hong Kong) Cheung Y M
- (Hong Kong) Fan K Y
19
18

==== Section 2 ====
First round

Second round

Quarterfinals

3
- (Indonesia) D D Haris

BYE

3
- (Indonesia) D D Haris
21
18
19

- (Malaysia) Chow M K
- (Malaysia) Lee M Y
12
21
21

- (Chinese Taipei) Chang Y-h
- (Chinese Taipei) Lin T-y
12
15

- (Malaysia) Chow M K
- (Malaysia) Lee M Y
21
21

- (Malaysia) Chow M K
- (Malaysia) Lee M Y
21
21

- (Chinese Taipei) Hsu Y-c
- (Chinese Taipei) Wu T-j
12
14

- (Chinese Taipei) Hsu Y-c
- (Chinese Taipei) Wu T-j
21
21

- (Indonesia) C S Ayunidha
6
9

- (Chinese Taipei) Hsu Y-c
- (Chinese Taipei) Wu T-j
21
21

- (Hong Kong) Ng T Y
- (Hong Kong) Yeung N T
19
18

- (Hong Kong) Ng T Y
- (Hong Kong) Yeung N T
21
21

- (Chinese Taipei) Lin X-m
- (Chinese Taipei) Wu F-c
14
14

=== Bottom half ===
==== Section 3 ====
First round

Second round

Quarterfinals

- (Hong Kong) Tse Y S
- (Hong Kong) Wu Y T
21
14
21

- (Chinese Taipei) Cheng Y-c
- (Chinese Taipei) Hu L-f
7
21
13

- (Hong Kong) Tse Y S
- (Hong Kong) Wu Y T
17
12

- (Indonesia) A S Awanda
21
21

- (Malaysia) Lim P Y
- (Malaysia) Lim P Z
10
14

- (Indonesia) A S Awanda
21
21

- (Indonesia) A S Awanda
21
21

- (Chinese Taipei) Chiang K-h
- (Chinese Taipei) Hung S-h
17
15

- (Indonesia) T R Nuraidah
19
21
21

- (Chinese Taipei) Chiang K-h
- (Chinese Taipei) Hung S-h
21
10
23

- (Chinese Taipei) Chiang K-h
- (Chinese Taipei) Hung S-h
w
/
o

4
- (Bulgaria) G Stoeva
- (Bulgaria) S Stoeva

BYE

4
- (Bulgaria) G Stoeva
- (Bulgaria) S Stoeva

==== Section 4 ====
First round
(Chinese Taipei) Wen H-y (Chinese Taipei) Ye J-y	w	/	o
(China) Huang YQ (China) Tang JH
(China) Huang DP (China) Li YH
(Macau) Gong X X (Macau) Ng W C	w	/	o
(Chinese Taipei) Chen H-h (Chinese Taipei) Huang M-c	21	21
(Indonesia) E Kurnianti (Indonesia) A Syafitri Nur	8	11
BYE
2	(Malaysia) Vivian Hoo K M (Malaysia) Woon K W

Second round
(Chinese Taipei) Wen H-y (Chinese Taipei) Ye J-y	21	21
(Macau) Gong X X (Macau) Ng W C	9	18
(Chinese Taipei) Chen H-h (Chinese Taipei) Huang M-c	14	14
2	(Malaysia) Vivian Hoo K M (Malaysia) Woon K W	21	21

Quarterfinals
(Chinese Taipei) Wen H-y (Chinese Taipei) Ye J-y	15	18
2	(Malaysia) Vivian Hoo K M (Malaysia) Woon K W	21	21

== Mixed doubles ==
=== Seeds ===
1. (Malaysia) Chan Peng Soon / Goh Liu Ying (quarterfinals)
2. (China) Zheng Siwei / Chen Qingchen (withdrew)
3. (Malaysia) Tan Kian Meng / Lai Pei Jing (semifinals)
4. (Hong Kong) Lee Chun Hei / Chau Hoi Wah (semifinals)
5. (Singapore) Terry Hee Yong Kai / Tan Wei Han (quarterfinals)
6. (Indonesia) Hafiz Faisal / Shella Devi Aulia (first round)
7. (Hong Kong) Tang Chun Man / Tse Ying Suet (final)
8. (Indonesia) Alfian Eko Prasetya / Annisa Saufika (quarterfinals)

=== Finals ===
Semifinals

Final

- (China) Zhang Nan
- (China) Li Yinhui
21
21

4
- (Hong Kong) Lee Chun Hei
- (Hong Kong) Chau Hoi Wah
17
15

- (China) Zhang Nan
- (China) Li Yinhui
21
21

7
- (Hong Kong) Tang Chun Man
- (Hong Kong) Tse Ying Suet
19
15

3
- (Malaysia) Tan Kian Meng
- (Malaysia) Lai Pei Jing
15
28

7
- (Hong Kong) Tang Chun Man
- (Hong Kong) Tse Ying Suet
21
30

=== Top half ===
==== Section 1 ====
First round

Second round

Quarterfinals

1
- (Malaysia) Chan P S
- (Malaysia) Goh L Y
21
21

- (Indonesia) F Kurniawan
17
19

1
- (Malaysia) Chan P S
- (Malaysia) Goh L Y
21
21

Q1
- (Chinese Taipei) Wang C-l
- (Chinese Taipei) Lee C-h
19
15

- (Indonesia) H Tandjaya
- (Indonesia) E Kurnianti
7
9

Q1
- (Chinese Taipei) Wang C-l
- (Chinese Taipei) Lee C-h
21
21

1
- (Malaysia) Chan P S
- (Malaysia) Goh L Y
12
22
15

- (China) Zhang N
- (China) Li YH
21
20
21

6
- (Indonesia) H Faisal
- (Indonesia) S D Aulia
21
19

- (Hong Kong) Mak H C
- (Hong Kong) Yeung N T
23
21

- (Hong Kong) Mak H C
- (Hong Kong) Yeung N T
9
15

- (China) Zhang N
- (China) Li YH
21
21

- (Chinese Taipei) Lu C-y
- (Chinese Taipei) Chiang K-h
15
17

- (China) Zhang N
- (China) Li YH
21
21

==== Section 2 ====
First round

Second round

Quarterfinals

4
- (Hong Kong) Lee C H
- (Hong Kong) Chau H W
25
22
21

(Indonesia) R Widianto
(Indonesia) G E Widjaja
23
24
13

4
- (Hong Kong) Lee C H
- (Hong Kong) Chau H W
21
20
21

- (Chinese Taipei) Lin C-y
- (Chinese Taipei) Wu T-j
16
22
11

- (Indonesia) H Rumengan
- (Indonesia) A Syafitri Nur
12
10

- (Chinese Taipei) Lin C-y
- (Chinese Taipei) Wu T-j
21
21

4
- (Hong Kong) Lee C H
- (Hong Kong) Chau H W
21
21

5
- (Singapore) Terry Hee Y K
13
11

5
- (Singapore) Terry Hee Y K
21
21

- (Indonesia) D Juang
16
19

5
- (Singapore) Terry Hee Y K
21
19
21

- (Chinese Taipei) Lee Y
- (Chinese Taipei) Kuo Y-w
13
21
18

- (Chinese Taipei) Lee Y
- (Chinese Taipei) Kuo Y-w
21
21

Q2
- (Indonesia) E Septian
9
13

=== Bottom half ===
==== Section 3 ====
First round

Second round

Quarterfinals

- (Indonesia) I Fadhilah
- (Indonesia) W Anggraini
18
14

- (Chinese Taipei) Liu W-c
- (Chinese Taipei) Chen H-h
21
21

- (Chinese Taipei) Liu W-c
- (Chinese Taipei) Chen H-h
11
21
18

8
- (Indonesia) A E Prasetya
- (Indonesia) A Saufika
21
19
21

Q4
- (Chinese Taipei) Yang P-h
- (Chinese Taipei) Cheng Y-c
15
12

8
- (Indonesia) A E Prasetya
- (Indonesia) A Saufika
21
21

8
- (Indonesia) A E Prasetya
- (Indonesia) A Saufika
20
22

3
- (Malaysia) Tan K M
- (Malaysia) Lai P J
22
24

PFQ
- (Hong Kong) Ho W L
- (Hong Kong) Yuen S Y
21
21

- (Indonesia) S Aditha
12
9

PFQ
- (Hong Kong) Ho W L
- (Hong Kong) Yuen S Y
16
25

3
- (Malaysia) Tan K M
- (Malaysia) Lai P J
21
27

- (Hong Kong) Law C H
- (Hong Kong) Ng W Y
18
16

3
- (Malaysia) Tan K M
- (Malaysia) Lai P J
21
21

==== Section 4 ====
First round

Second round

Quarterfinals

- (Chinese Taipei) Lee J-h
- (Chinese Taipei) Chen S-y
21
21

- (Indonesia) H Bl
- (Indonesia) R S Putri
9
9

- (Chinese Taipei) Lee J-h
- (Chinese Taipei) Chen S-y
13
18

7
- (Hong Kong) Tang C M
- (Hong Kong) Tse Y S
21
21

- (Indonesia) E Subaktiar
- (Indonesia) R P Dili
14
8

7
- (Hong Kong) Tang C M
- (Hong Kong) Tse Y S
21
21

7
- (Hong Kong) Tang C M
- (Hong Kong) Tse Y S
21
21

(Hong Kong) Tam C H
(Hong Kong) Ng T Y
16
11

Q3
- (Malaysia) M A Abdul Latif
21
16
11

(Hong Kong) Tam C H
(Hong Kong) Ng T Y
9
21
21

(Hong Kong) Tam C H
(Hong Kong) Ng T Y
21
21

PFQ
- (Chinese Taipei) Tseng M-h
- (Chinese Taipei) Hu L-f
17
19

- (Chinese Taipei) Lin C-h
- (Chinese Taipei) Chang Y-h
21
15
17

PFQ
- (Chinese Taipei) Tseng M-h
- (Chinese Taipei) Hu L-f
12
21
21

Preceded by 2016 Scottish Open Grand Prix	BWF Grand Prix Gold and Grand Prix; 2016 BWF Season	Succeeded by 2016 Korea Masters Grand Prix Gold
