= Alfian Eko Prasetya =

Indonesian badminton player (born 1994)

Personal information
- Born: 4 August 1994 (age 32) Jakarta, Indonesia
- Height: 1.75 m (5 ft 9 in)
- Weight: 72 kg (159 lb)

Sport
- Country: Indonesia
- Sport: Badminton
- Handedness: Right

Men's & mixed doubles
- Highest ranking: 18 (XD with Annisa Saufika, 16 February 2017)
- Current ranking: 106 (MD with Ade Yusuf Santoso, 21 March 2023); 286 (XD with Masita Mahmudin, 21 March 2023)
- BWF profile
Medal record
Men's badminton
Representing Indonesia
Asia Mixed Team Championships
Bronze medal – third place	2019 Hong Kong	Mixed team
World Junior Championships
Gold medal – first place	2011 Taipei	Mixed doubles
Silver medal – second place	2012 Chiba	Mixed doubles
Asia Junior Championships
Bronze medal – third place	2012 Gimcheon	Boys' doubles

Alfian Eko Prasetya (born 4 August 1994) is an Indonesian badminton player specializes in doubles, affiliated with Jaya Raya Jakarta badminton club. He was the mixed doubles gold medalist at the 2011 BWF World Junior Championships partnered with Gloria Emanuelle Widjaja. He won his first Grand Prix title at the 2014 New Zealand Open with Annisa Saufika.

== Achievements ==
=== BWF World Junior Championships ===
Mixed doubles
Year	Venue	Partner	Opponent	Score	Result
2011	Taoyuan Arena; Taoyuan City, Taipei, Taiwan	(Indonesia) Gloria Emanuelle Widjaja	(Indonesia) Ronald Alexander (Indonesia) Tiara Rosalia Nuraidah	12–21, 21–17, 25–23	Gold
2012	Chiba Port Arena; Chiba, Japan	(Indonesia) Shella Devi Aulia	(Indonesia) Edi Subaktiar (Indonesia) Melati Daeva Oktavianti	17–21, 13–21	Silver

=== Asian Junior Championships ===
Boys' doubles
Year	Venue	Partner	Opponent	Score	Result
2012	Gimcheon Indoor Stadium; Gimcheon, South Korea	(Indonesia) Kevin Sanjaya Sukamuljo	(Chinese Taipei) Wang Chi-lin (Chinese Taipei) Wu Hsiao-lin	20–22, 13–21	Bronze

=== BWF World Tour (1 title, 2 runners-up) ===
The BWF World Tour, which was announced on 19 March 2017 and implemented in 2018, is a series of elite badminton tournaments sanctioned by the Badminton World Federation (BWF). The BWF World Tour is divided into levels of World Tour Finals, Super 1000, Super 750, Super 500, Super 300 (part of the HSBC World Tour), and the BWF Tour Super 100.

Mixed doubles
Year	Tournament	Level	Partner	Opponent	Score	Result
2018	Akita Masters	Super 100	(Indonesia) Angelica Wiratama	(Japan) Kohei Gondo (Japan) Ayane Kurihara	9–21, 23–21, 17–21	(silver) Runner-up
2018	Vietnam Open	Super 100	(Indonesia) Marsheilla Gischa Islami	(Thailand) Nipitphon Phuangphuapet (Thailand) Savitree Amitrapai	21–13, 18–21, 19–21	(silver) Runner-up
2018	Chinese Taipei Open	Super 300	(Indonesia) Marsheilla Gischa Islami	(Chinese Taipei) Yang Po-hsuan (Chinese Taipei) Wu Ti-jung	21–15, 21–11	(gold) Winner

=== BWF Grand Prix (2 titles, 3 runners-up) ===
The BWF Grand Prix had two levels, the Grand Prix and Grand Prix Gold. It was a series of badminton tournaments sanctioned by the Badminton World Federation (BWF) and played between 2007 and 2017.

Mixed doubles
Year	Tournament	Partner	Opponent	Score	Result
2014	New Zealand Open	(Indonesia) Annisa Saufika	(Indonesia) Edi Subaktiar (Indonesia) Melati Daeva Oktavianti	21–18, 17–21, 21–12	(gold) Winner
2014	Chinese Taipei Open	(Indonesia) Annisa Saufika	(China) Liu Yuchen (China) Yu Xiaohan	12–21, 14–21	(silver) Runner-up
2014	Bitburger Open	(Indonesia) Annisa Saufika	(China) Zheng Siwei (China) Chen Qingchen	11–21, 13–21	(silver) Runner-up
2016	Vietnam Open	(Indonesia) Annisa Saufika	(Malaysia) Tan Kian Meng (Malaysia) Lai Pei Jing	16–21, 12–21	(silver) Runner-up
2017	Vietnam Open	(Indonesia) Melati Daeva Oktavianti	(Indonesia) Riky Widianto (Indonesia) Masita Mahmudin	21–14, 21–14	(gold) Winner

BWF Grand Prix Gold tournament
BWF Grand Prix tournament

=== BWF International Challenge/Series (5 titles, 3 runners-up) ===
Men's doubles
Year	Tournament	Partner	Opponent	Score	Result
2013	Maldives International	(Indonesia) Arya Maulana Aldiartama	(Chinese Taipei) Tien Tzu-chieh (Chinese Taipei) Wang Chi-lin	15–21, 17–21	(silver) Runner-up
2013	Malaysia International	(Indonesia) Selvanus Geh	(Malaysia) Chooi Kah Ming (Malaysia) Teo Ee Yi	21–15, 21–13	(gold) Winner
2022	Indonesia International	(Indonesia) Ade Yusuf Santoso	(Indonesia) Reinard Dhanriano (Indonesia) Kenas Adi Haryanto	21–16, 18–21, 21–16	(gold) Winner
2023	Vietnam International	(Indonesia) Ade Yusuf Santoso	(South Korea) Jin Yong (South Korea) Na Sung-seung	8–21, 6–21	(silver) Runner-up

Mixed doubles
Year	Tournament	Partner	Opponent	Score	Result
2012	India International	(Indonesia) Gloria Emanuelle Widjaja	(Indonesia) Irfan Fadhilah (Indonesia) Weni Anggraini	16–21, 19–21	(silver) Runner-up
2013	Malaysia International	(Indonesia) Shendy Puspa Irawati	(Chinese Taipei) Wang Chi-lin (Chinese Taipei) Wu Ti-jung	21–15, 21–16	(gold) Winner
2014	Vietnam International	(Indonesia) Annisa Saufika	(Hong Kong) Fernando Kurniawan (Hong Kong) Poon Lok Yan	14–21, 17–21	(gold) Winner
2018	Finnish Open	(Indonesia) Marsheilla Gischa Islami	(Indonesia) Akbar Bintang Cahyono (Indonesia) Winny Oktavina Kandow	21–18, 21–16	(gold) Winner

BWF International Challenge tournament
BWF International Series tournament

== Performance timeline ==
Key

W	Won	F	Finalist	SF	Semi-finalist
QF	Quarter-finalist	#R	Rounds 4, 3, 2, 1	RR	Round-robin stage
Q#	Qualification round	A	Absent	w/d	Withdrew
G	Gold	S	Silver	B	Bronze
NH	Not held	N/A	Not applicable	DNQ	Did not qualify

=== National team ===
- Junior level

Team events	2011	2012
Asian Junior Championships	A	QF
World Junior Championships	7th	4th

- Senior level

Team event	2017	2018	2019
Asia Mixed Team Championships	QF	NH	B

=== Individual competitions ===
==== Junior level ====
- Boys' doubles

Events	2011	2012
Asian Junior Championships	A	B
World Junior Championships	3R	A

- Mixed doubles

Events	2011	2012
Asian Junior Championships	A	3R
World Junior Championships	G	S

==== Senior level ====
===== Men's doubles =====
Tournament	BWF Superseries / Grand Prix				BWF World Tour					Best
Tournament	2014	2015	2016	2017	2018	2019	2020	2021	2022	Best
Vietnam Open	SF	A					NH		A	SF ('14)
Indonesia Masters Super 100	NA				A		NH		QF	QF ('22)
Year-end ranking	209	—N/a	—N/a	—N/a	—N/a	—N/a	—N/a	—N/a		156

===== Mixed doubles =====
Event	2017	2018	2019
Asian Championships	1R	A	1R

Tournament	BWF Superseries / Grand Prix						BWF World Tour					Best
Tournament	2012	2013	2014	2015	2016	2017	2018	2019	2020	2021	2022	Best
Syed Modi International	A	NH	A				SF	A	NH		A	SF ('18)
Spain Masters	NH						A	1R	A		NH	1R ('19)
German Open	A		1R	A			A	2R	NH		A	2R ('19)
All England Open	A					1R	A	1R	A			1R ('17, '19)
Swiss Open	A					1R	A		NH	A		1R ('17)
Orléans Masters	NA						SF	A	NH	A		SF ('18)
Korea Masters	2R	A		1R	A	QF	1R	A	NH		A	QF ('17)
Thailand Open	1R	A	NH	A	1R	A		2R	A	NH	A	2R ('19)
Indonesia Masters	QF	2R	QF	QF	A	NH	A	1R	2R	1R	A	QF ('12, '14, '15)
Indonesia Open	1R	Q1	1R	1R	QF	2R	A	1R	NH	A		QF ('16)
Malaysia Open	A					1R	A	1R	NH		A	1R ('17, '19)
Malaysia Masters	2R	1R	A	1R	A			1R	Q1	NH	A	2R ('12)
Singapore Open	A					1R	A	1R	NH		A	1R ('17, '19)
Chinese Taipei Open		QF	F	2R	2R	A	W	1R	NH		A	W ('18)
Akita Masters	NA						F	A	NH			F ('18)
Vietnam Open	A		QF	QF	F	W	F	A	NH		A	W ('17)
Indonesia Masters Super 100	NA						1R	SF	NH		2R	SF ('19)
French Open	A		2R	A	1R	A			NH	A		2R ('14)
Bitburger Open	A		F	A	1R	A						F ('14)
Macau Open	1R	A		1R	QF	2R	QF	A	NH			QF ('16, '18)
Hong Kong Open	A				1R	2R	A		NH			2R ('17)
New Zealand Open	NH	A	W	1R	2R	A			NH			W ('14)
China Masters	A				1R	A			NH			1R ('16)
Chinese Taipei Masters	NH			2R	A	NH						2R ('15)
Thailand Masters	NH				1R	SF	A	QF	Q1	NH		SF ('17)
Year-end ranking	50	101	22	66	28	62	40	50	81	105		18
Tournament	2012	2013	2014	2015	2016	2017	2018	2019	2020	2021	2022	Best

== Record against selected opponents ==
Mixed doubles results with Annisa Saufika against World Superseries finalists, World Championship semi-finalists, and Olympic quarter-finalists.

- (China) Xu Chen & Ma Jin 0–2
- (Germany) Michael Fuchs & Birgit Michels 1–0
- (Indonesia) Riky Widianto & Richi Puspita Dili 0–1
