= Annisa Saufika =

Indonesian badminton player (born 1993)

Personal information
- Born: 21 June 1993 (age 33) Cirebon, West Java, Indonesia
- Height: 1.73 m (5 ft 8 in)

Sport
- Country: Indonesia
- Sport: Badminton
- Handedness: Right

Women's & mixed doubles
- Highest ranking: 18 (XD with Alfian Eko Prasetya 16 February 2017)
- Current ranking: 93 (with Ronald Alexander 24 August 2021); 218 (with Akbar Bintang Cahyono 24 August 2021); 223 (with Alfian Eko Prasetya 24 August 2021)
- BWF profile

Annisa Saufika (born 21 June 1993) is an Indonesian badminton player who specializes in doubles. She is from PB Djarum, a badminton club in Kudus, Central Java, which she joined in 2010. Teamed-up with Alfian Eko Prasetya, she won the 2014 Vietnam International Challenge and New Zealand Open Grand Prix tournament in the mixed doubles event.

== Achievements ==
=== BWF World Tour (1 runner-up) ===
The BWF World Tour, which was announced on 19 March 2017 and implemented in 2018, is a series of elite badminton tournaments sanctioned by the Badminton World Federation (BWF). The BWF World Tours are divided into levels of World Tour Finals, Super 1000, Super 750, Super 500, Super 300 (part of the HSBC World Tour), and the BWF Tour Super 100.

Mixed doubles
Year	Tournament	Level	Partner	Opponent	Score	Result
2018	Lingshui China Masters	Super 100	(Indonesia) Ronald Alexander	(China) Guo Xinwa (China) Liu Xuanxuan	17–21, 21–7, 19–21	(silver) Runner-up

=== BWF Grand Prix (2 titles, 3 runners-up) ===
The BWF Grand Prix had two levels, the Grand Prix and Grand Prix Gold. It was a series of badminton tournaments sanctioned by the Badminton World Federation (BWF) and played between 2007 and 2017.

Mixed doubles
Year	Tournament	Partner	Opponent	Score	Result
2014	New Zealand Open	(Indonesia) Alfian Eko Prasetya	(Indonesia) Edi Subaktiar (Indonesia) Melati Daeva Oktavianti	21–18, 17–21, 21–12	(gold) Winner
2014	Chinese Taipei Open	(Indonesia) Alfian Eko Prasetya	(China) Liu Yuchen (China) Yu Xiaohan	12–21, 14–21	(silver) Runner-up
2014	Bitburger Open	(Indonesia) Alfian Eko Prasetya	(China) Zheng Siwei (China) Chen Qingchen	11–21, 13–21	(silver) Runner-up
2016	Vietnam Open	(Indonesia) Alfian Eko Prasetya	(Malaysia) Tan Kian Meng (Malaysia) Lai Pei Jing	16–21, 12–21	(silver) Runner-up
2017	New Zealand Open	(Indonesia) Ronald Alexander	(Australia) Sawan Serasinghe (Australia) Setyana Mapasa	21–19, 21–14	(gold) Winner

BWF Grand Prix Gold tournament
BWF Grand Prix tournament

=== BWF International Challenge/Series (2 titles, 1 runner-up) ===
Mixed doubles
Year	Tournament	Partner	Opponent	Score	Result
2012	Malaysia International	(Indonesia) Lukhi Apri Nugroho	(Malaysia) Ong Jian Guo (Malaysia) Woon Khe Wei	11–21, 14–21	(silver) Runner-up
2013	Osaka International	(Indonesia) Lukhi Apri Nugroho	(Chinese Taipei) Lin Chia-yu (Chinese Taipei) Wang Pei-rong	21–16, 21–19	(gold) Winner
2014	Vietnam International	(Indonesia) Alfian Eko Prasetya	(Hong Kong) Fernando Kurniawan (Hong Kong) Poon Lok Yan	21–14, 21–17	(gold) Winner

BWF International Challenge tournament
BWF Future Series tournament

== Performance timeline ==
=== National team ===
- Senior level

Team event	2017
Asia Mixed Team Championships	QF

=== Individual competitions ===
- Senior level

Event	2013	2014	2015	2016	2017	2018	2019
Asian Championships	R2	A			R1	A	
World Championships	A			—N/a	A	R2	R1

Tournament	BWF World Tour			Best
Tournament	2018	2019	2020	Best
Malaysia Masters	A	R1	Q1	QF (2013)
Indonesia Masters	A	R1	R2	QF (2013, 2014)
Thailand Masters	A	R2	Q1	SF (2017)
All England Open	A	R1	A	R1 (2017, 2019)
Swiss Open	A	R2	—N/a	R2 (2019)
Lingshui China Masters	F	A	—N/a	F (2018)
Malaysia Open	R2	R2	—N/a	R2 (2018, 2019)
Singapore Open	R1	R2	—N/a	R2 (2019)
New Zealand Open	QF	R2	—N/a	W (2014, 2017)
Australian Open	R1	R2	—N/a	R2 (2019)
Indonesia Open	R1	R1	—N/a	QF (2016)
Thailand Open	A	R1	A	QF (2017)
Chinese Taipei Open	SF	R1	—N/a	F (2014)
Korea Open	R1	A	—N/a	R1 (2018)
Indonesia Masters Super 100	A	R2	—N/a	R2 (2019)
Macau Open	QF	A	—N/a	QF (2016, 2018)
Hong Kong Open	R2	A	—N/a	R2 (2018)
Syed Modi International	QF	A	—N/a	QF (2018)
Year-end ranking	31	52	76	18
Tournament	2018	2019	2020	Best

Tournament	BWF Superseries							Best
Tournament	2011	2012	2013	2014	2015	2016	2017	Best
All England Open	A						R1	R1 (2017)
Malaysia Open	A						R1	R1 (2017)
Singapore Open	A						R1	R1 (2017)
Indonesia Open	Q1 (WD)	R1	R1	R1	R1	QF	R2	QF (2016)
Korea Open	A						Q2	Q2 (2017)
China Masters	A		QF	GPG				QF (2013)
French Open	A			R2	A	R1	A	R2 (2014)
Hong Kong Open	A					R1	A	R1 (2016)
Year-end ranking		65	28	215 (WD); 22 (XD)	66	28	62	18

Tournament	BWF Grand Prix and Grand Prix Gold							Best
Tournament	2011	2012	2013	2014	2015	2016	2017	Best
Malaysia Masters	A		QF	A	R1	A		QF (2013)
Thailand Masters	—N/a					R1	SF	SF (2017)
Swiss Open	A						R1	R1 (2017)
German Open	A			R1 (WD); R1 (XD)	A			R1 (2014)
Thailand Open	A	R2	R1	—N/a	A	R1	QF	QF (2017)
New Zealand Open	IC	—N/a	A	W (XD)	A	R2	W	W (2014, 2017)
China Masters	SS			A		R1	A	QF (2013)
Chinese Taipei Open	A			F (XD)	R2	R2	A	F (2014)
Vietnam Open	A		w/d	R2 (WD); QF (XD)	QF	F	SF	F (2016)
Bitburger Open	A			F (XD)	A	R1	w/d	F (2014)
London Grand Prix Gold	—N/a		QF	—N/a				QF (2013)
Dutch Open	A		R2	A				R2 (2013)
Chinese Taipei Masters	—N/a				R2	A	—N/a	R2 (2015)
Korea Masters	A	R1	R1	A	R1	A		R1 (2012, 2013, 2015)
Macau Open	A				R1	QF	A	QF (2016)
Indonesian Masters	R1 (WD); Q1 (XD)	R2	QF	QF (XD)	R1	A	—N/a	QF (2013, 2014)
Year-end ranking		65	28	215 (WD); 22 (XD)	66	28	62	18

== Record against selected opponents ==
Mixed doubles results with Alfian Eko Prasetya against World Superseries finalists, World Championship semi-finalists, and Olympic quarter-finalists:

- (China) Xu Chen & Ma Jin 0–2
- (Germany) Michael Fuchs & Birgit Michels 1–0
- (Indonesia) Riky Widianto & Richi Puspita Dili 0–1
