= 2018 Chinese Taipei Open =

2018 badminton tournament

Tournament details
- Dates: 2–7 October
- Level: Super 300
- Total prize money: US$500,000
- Venue: Taipei Arena
- Location: Taipei, Taiwan

Champions
- Men's singles: (Malaysia) Lee Zii Jia
- Women's singles: (Chinese Taipei) Tai Tzu-ying
- Men's doubles: (Chinese Taipei) Chen Hung-ling (Chinese Taipei) Wang Chi-lin
- Women's doubles: (Japan) Nami Matsuyama (Japan) Chiharu Shida
- Mixed doubles: (Indonesia) Alfian Eko Prasetya (Indonesia) Marsheilla Gischa Islami

The 2018 Chinese Taipei Open (officially known as the Yonex Chinese Taipei Open 2018 for sponsorship reasons) was a badminton tournament that took place at the Taipei Arena in Taipei, Taiwan, from 2 to 7 October 2018 and had a total prize of $500,000.

== Tournament ==
The 2018 Chinese Taipei Open was the nineteenth tournament of the 2018 BWF World Tour and also part of the Chinese Taipei Open championships, which had been held annually since 1980. This tournament was organized by the Chinese Taipei Badminton Association and sanctioned by the BWF.

=== Venue ===
This international tournament was held at the Taipei Arena in Taipei, Taiwan.

=== Point distribution ===
Below is the point distribution table for each phase of the tournament based on the BWF points system for the BWF World Tour Super 300 event.

Winner	Runner-up	3/4	5/8	9/16	17/32	33/64	65/128
7,000	5,950	4,900	3,850	2,750	1,670	660	320

=== Prize money ===
The total prize money for this tournament was US$500,000. Distribution of prize money was in accordance with BWF regulations.

Event	Winner	Finals	Semi-finals	Quarter-finals	Last 16
Singles	$37,500	$19,000	$7,250	$3,000	$1,750
Doubles	$39,500	$19,000	$7,000	$3,625	$1,875

== Men's singles ==
=== Seeds ===
1. (Chinese Taipei) Chou Tien-chen (semi-finals)
2. (Chinese Taipei) Wang Tzu-wei (first round)
3. (Malaysia) Liew Daren (first round)
4. (Chinese Taipei) Hsu Jen-hao (first round)
5. (Denmark) Jan Ø. Jørgensen (semi-finals)
6. (Indonesia) Ihsan Maulana Mustofa (first round)
7. (France) Lucas Corvée (first round)
8. (Malaysia) Chong Wei Feng (quarter-finals)

=== Finals ===
Semi-finals
1	(Chinese Taipei) Chou Tien-chen	21	14	22
(Malaysia) Lee Zii Jia	17	21	24
5	(Denmark) Jan Ø. Jørgensen	17	21	24
(Japan) Riichi Takeshita	21	16	26

Final
(Malaysia) Lee Zii Jia	21	16	21
(Japan) Riichi Takeshita	17	21	11

=== Top half ===
==== Section 1 ====
First Round
1	(Chinese Taipei) Chou T-c	21	21
(Hong Kong) Hu Y	17	9
PFQ	(Chinese Taipei) Yang C-c	17	19
(Israel) M Zilberman	21	21
6	(Indonesia) I M Mustofa	15	21	12
Q4	(Hong Kong) Chan Y C	21	18	21
(Hong Kong) Lee C Y	21	21
Q3	(Chinese Taipei) Lin C-h	10	10

Second Round
1	(Chinese Taipei) Chou T-c	21	21
(Israel) M Zilberman	9	8
Q4	(Hong Kong) Chan Y C	13	21	19
(Hong Kong) Lee C Y	21	17	21

Quarter-finals
1	(Chinese Taipei) Chou T-c	21	21
(Hong Kong) Lee C Y	19	7

==== Section 2 ====
First Round
4	(Chinese Taipei) Hsu J-h	18	20
(Malaysia) Lee Z J	21	22
(Vietnam) Phạm C C	17	15
Q2	(Indonesia) C A Dwi Wardoyo	21	21
7	(France) L Corvée	19	15
(Denmark) K Bruun	21	21
(Japan) H Shimono	21	17	9
(India) A Jayaram	18	21	21

Second Round
(Malaysia) Lee Z J	21	21
Q2	(Indonesia) C A Dwi Wardoyo	17	8
(Denmark) K Bruun	10	20
(India) A Jayaram	21	22

Quarter-finals
(Malaysia) Lee Z J	21	21
(India) A Jayaram	16	9

=== Bottom half ===
==== Section 3 ====
First Round
(Indonesia) F A Kholik	21	21
PFQ	(Chinese Taipei) Hsueh H-y	19	6
(India) A Yeligar	5	6
5	(Denmark) J Ø. Jørgensen	21	21
(Chinese Taipei) Lu C-h	21	21
(India) R Y Chittaboina	11	9
Q1	(Chinese Taipei) Chen C-t	21	21
3	(Malaysia) D Liew	19	18

Second Round
(Indonesia) F A Kholik	16	13
5	(Denmark) J Ø. Jørgensen	21	21
(Chinese Taipei) Lu C-h	21	20
Q1	(Chinese Taipei) Chen C-t	23	22

Quarter-finals
5	(Denmark) J Ø. Jørgensen	21	21
Q1	(Chinese Taipei) Chen C-t	18	12

==== Section 4 ====
First Round
(Chinese Taipei) Lin Y-h	10	21	21
(Malaysia) Leong J H	21	18	13
(Vietnam) Nguyễn T M	21	17	13
8	(Malaysia) Chong W F	13	21	21
(India) S Verma	18	21	21
(Chinese Taipei) Lee C-h	21	16	13
(Japan) R Takeshita	21	21
2	(Chinese Taipei) Wang T-w	17	17

Second Round
(Chinese Taipei) Lin Y-h	21	24	21
8	(Malaysia) Chong W F	10	26	23
(India) S Verma	21	21	16
(Japan) R Takeshita	19	23	21

Quarter-finals
8	(Malaysia) Chong W F	15	11
(Japan) R Takeshita	21	21

== Women's singles ==
=== Seeds ===
1. (Chinese Taipei) Tai Tzu-ying (champion)
2. (Canada) Michelle Li (first round)
3. (Denmark) Line Kjærsfeldt (final)
4. (Chinese Taipei) Pai Yu-po (quarter-finals)
5. (Hong Kong) Yip Pui Yin (semi-finals)
6. (Chinese Taipei) Lee Chia-hsin (second round)
7. (Malaysia) Soniia Cheah Su Ya (semi-finals)
8. (Indonesia) Fitriani (quarter-finals)

=== Finals ===
Semi-finals
1	(Chinese Taipei) Tai Tzu-ying	21	21
7	(Malaysia) Soniia Cheah Su Ya	16	19
3	(Denmark) Line Kjærsfeldt	21	21
5	(Hong Kong) Yip Pui Yin	14	19

Final
1	(Chinese Taipei) Tai Tzu-ying	17	21	21
3	(Denmark) Line Kjærsfeldt	21	10	13

=== Top half ===
==== Section 1 ====
First Round
1	(Chinese Taipei) Tai T-y	17	21	21
(Vietnam) Vũ T T	21	15	7
(Chinese Taipei) Chiang Y-l	21	21
(India) S U R Chukka	15	18
6	(Chinese Taipei) Lee C-h	22	23
(Japan) A Takahashi	20	21
(Chinese Taipei) Sung S-y	21	21
(Thailand) P Buranaprasertsuk	14	19

Second Round
1	(Chinese Taipei) Tai T-y	21	21
(Chinese Taipei) Chiang Y-l	11	8
6	(Chinese Taipei) Lee C-h	25	16
(Chinese Taipei) Sung S-y	27	21

Quarter-finals
1	(Chinese Taipei) Tai T-y	21	21
(Chinese Taipei) Sung S-y	6	14

==== Section 2 ====
First Round
4	(Chinese Taipei) Pai Y-p	13	21	21
(Indonesia) D D Ayustine	21	14	9
(Indonesia) R Hartawan	17	21	23
Q1	(Chinese Taipei) Tang W-y	21	18	21
7	(Malaysia) S Cheah S Y	21	21
(India) M Agrey	11	4
(Denmark) J D Jakobsen	21	21
(United States) I Zhong	15	7

Second Round
4	(Chinese Taipei) Pai Y-p	17	21	21
(Indonesia) R Hartawan	21	19	17
7	(Malaysia) S Cheah S Y	21	21
(Denmark) J D Jakobsen	10	10

Quarter-finals
4	(Chinese Taipei) Pai Y-p	19	18
7	(Malaysia) S Cheah S Y	21	21

=== Bottom half ===
==== Section 3 ====
First Round
PFQ	(United States) L Lam	9	21	19
(United States) C Pan	21	18	21
(Chinese Taipei) Lin H-t	10	13
8	(Indonesia) Fitriani	21	21
(Chinese Taipei) Lin Y-c	23	22
(India) S K P Kudaravalli	21	20
Q3	(Hong Kong) Cheung Y M	14	10
3	(Denmark) L Kjærsfeldt	21	21

Second Round
(United States) C Pan	8	16
8	(Indonesia) Fitriani	21	21
(Chinese Taipei) Lin Y-c	10	6
3	(Denmark) L Kjærsfeldt	21	21

Quarter-finals
8	(Indonesia) Fitriani	13	20
3	(Denmark) L Kjærsfeldt	21	22

==== Section 4 ====
First Round
(Japan) H Suzuki	21	14	15
Q4	(Chinese Taipei) Hung Y-t	16	21	21
(Thailand) N Aimsaard	17	10
5	(Hong Kong) Yip P Y	21	21
(Chinese Taipei) Chen S-y	21	21
Q2	(Hong Kong) Fan K Y	11	16
PFQ	(Chinese Taipei) Liang T-y	21	21
2	(Canada) M Li	19	14

Second Round
Q4	(Chinese Taipei) Hung Y-t	15	21	13
5	(Hong Kong) Yip P Y	21	14	21
(Chinese Taipei) Chen S-y	17	15
PFQ	(Chinese Taipei) Liang T-y	21	21

Quarter-finals
5	(Hong Kong) Yip P Y	21	21
PFQ	(Chinese Taipei) Liang T-y	14	7

== Men's doubles ==
=== Seeds ===
1. (Chinese Taipei) Chen Hung-ling / Wang Chi-lin (champions)
2. (Chinese Taipei) Lee Jhe-huei / Lee Yang (quarter-finals)
3. (Chinese Taipei) Liao Min-chun / Su Ching-heng (final)
4. (Malaysia) Ong Yew Sin / Teo Ee Yi (second round)
5. (Thailand) Bodin Isara / Maneepong Jongjit (semi-finals)
6. (Malaysia) Aaron Chia / Soh Wooi Yik (quarter-finals)
7. (Chinese Taipei) Lu Ching-yao / Yang Po-han (semi-finals)
8. (Malaysia) Mohamad Arif Abdul Latif / Nur Mohd Azriyn Ayub (second round)

=== Finals ===
Semi-finals
1	(Chinese Taipei) Chen Hung-ling (Chinese Taipei) Wang Chi-lin	21	21
5	(Thailand) Bodin Isara (Thailand) Maneepong Jongjit	16	10
3	(Chinese Taipei) Liao Min-chun (Chinese Taipei) Su Ching-heng	24	21
7	(Chinese Taipei) Lu Ching-yao (Chinese Taipei) Yang Po-han	22	14

Final
1	(Chinese Taipei) Chen Hung-ling (Chinese Taipei) Wang Chi-lin	22	21
3	(Chinese Taipei) Liao Min-chun (Chinese Taipei) Su Ching-heng	20	9

=== Top half ===
==== Section 1 ====
First Round
1	(Chinese Taipei) Chen H-l (Chinese Taipei) Wang C-l	21	17	21
(South Korea) Kang M-h (South Korea) Kim W-h	10	21	15
(Malaysia) Goh S F (Malaysia) N Izzuddin	21	20	21
(Chinese Taipei) Lin S-k (Chinese Taipei) Tseng M-h	14	22	18
6	(Malaysia) A Chia (Malaysia) Soh W Y	21	21
(Vietnam) Bảo M (Vietnam) Dương B Đ	14	9
(Hong Kong) Law C H (Hong Kong) Or C C	12	13
(Chinese Taipei) Chang K-c (Chinese Taipei) Lu C-p	21	21

Second Round
1	(Chinese Taipei) Chen H-l (Chinese Taipei) Wang C-l	18	21	21
(Malaysia) Goh S F (Malaysia) N Izzuddin	21	18	12
6	(Malaysia) A Chia (Malaysia) Soh W Y	21	21
(Chinese Taipei) Chang K-c (Chinese Taipei) Lu C-p	14	16

Quarter-finals
1	(Chinese Taipei) Chen H-l (Chinese Taipei) Wang C-l	21	17	21
6	(Malaysia) A Chia (Malaysia) Soh W Y	13	21	16

==== Section 2 ====
First Round
4	(Malaysia) Ong Y S (Malaysia) Teo E Y	21	21
(India) T Kona (Malaysia) Lim K W	13	10
(Indonesia) A B Cahyono (Indonesia) M R P Isfahani	14	21	18
(Chinese Taipei) Lee S-m (Chinese Taipei) Yang P-h	21	18	21
5	(Thailand) B Isara (Thailand) M Jongjit	21	19	21
(Malaysia) Chooi K M (Malaysia) Low J S	16	21	19
(Chinese Taipei) Lee F-c (Chinese Taipei) Lee F-j	9	16
(Hong Kong) Chung Y (Hong Kong) Tam C H	21	21

Second Round
4	(Malaysia) Ong Y S (Malaysia) Teo E Y	19	20
(Chinese Taipei) Lee S-m (Chinese Taipei) Yang P-h	21	22
5	(Thailand) B Isara (Thailand) M Jongjit	22	21
(Hong Kong) Chung Y (Hong Kong) Tam C H	20	10

Quarter-finals
(Chinese Taipei) Lee S-m (Chinese Taipei) Yang P-h	16	21	16
5	(Thailand) B Isara (Thailand) M Jongjit	21	14	21

=== Bottom half ===
==== Section 3 ====
First Round
(Japan) K Matsui (Japan) Y Takeuchi	15	21	21
(Chinese Taipei) Kan C-y (Chinese Taipei) Liao C-h	21	15	17
Q1	(Chinese Taipei) Lin S-c (Chinese Taipei) Wang C-h	19	18
8	(Malaysia) M A L Arif (Malaysia) N M A Azriyn	21	21
(Chinese Taipei) Lu C (Chinese Taipei) Ye H-w	21	21
Q3	(Chinese Taipei) Lin Y-c (Chinese Taipei) Wu Y-c	14	12
Q2	(Chinese Taipei) Chang E-c (Chinese Taipei) Chen X-y	14	30	20
3	(Chinese Taipei) Liao M-c (Chinese Taipei) Su C-h	21	28	22

Second Round
(Japan) K Matsui (Japan) Y Takeuchi	21	16	21
8	(Malaysia) M A L Arif (Malaysia) N M A Azriyn	16	21	19
(Chinese Taipei) Lu C (Chinese Taipei) Ye H-w	20	21	25
3	(Chinese Taipei) Liao M-c (Chinese Taipei) Su C-h	22	18	27

Quarter-finals
(Japan) K Matsui (Japan) Y Takeuchi	15	17
3	(Chinese Taipei) Liao M-c (Chinese Taipei) Su C-h	21	21

==== Section 4 ====
First Round
(Denmark) D Daugaard (Denmark) F Søgaard Mortensen	23	21
(Chinese Taipei) Lin C-y (Chinese Taipei) Yang M-t	21	16
(Japan) M Kaneko (Japan) Y Kubota	17	17
7	(Chinese Taipei) Lu C-y (Chinese Taipei) Yang P-h	21	21
PFQ	(Hong Kong) Chang T C (Hong Kong) Yeung M N	18	13
(Japan) A Koga (Japan) T Saito	21	21
Q4	(Indonesia) F W Putra (Indonesia) R A Saputro	13	16
2	(Chinese Taipei) Lee J-h (Chinese Taipei) Lee Y	21	21

Second Round
(Denmark) D Daugaard (Denmark) F Søgaard Mortensen	18	19
7	(Chinese Taipei) Lu C-y (Chinese Taipei) Yang P-h	21	21
(Japan) A Koga (Japan) T Saito	15	14
2	(Chinese Taipei) Lee J-h (Chinese Taipei) Lee Y	21	21

Quarter-finals
7	(Chinese Taipei) Lu C-y (Chinese Taipei) Yang P-h	21	17	26
2	(Chinese Taipei) Lee J-h (Chinese Taipei) Lee Y	19	21	24

== Women's doubles ==
=== Seeds ===
1. (Japan) Ayako Sakuramoto / Yukiko Takahata (semi-finals)
2. (Japan) Naoko Fukuman / Kurumi Yonao (semi-finals)
3. (Chinese Taipei) Hsu Ya-ching / Wu Ti-jung (first round)
4. (Japan) Nami Matsuyama / Chiharu Shida (champions)
5. (Malaysia) Lim Chiew Sien / Tan Sueh Jeou (first round)
6. (Hong Kong) Ng Tsz Yau / Yuen Sin Ying (quarter-finals)
7. (Chinese Taipei) Chen Hsiao-huan / Hu Ling-fang (first round)
8. (Indonesia) Agatha Imanuela / Siti Fadia Silva Ramadhanti (quarter-finals)

=== Finals ===
Semi-finals
1	(Japan) Ayako Sakuramoto (Japan) Yukiko Takahata	15	12
4	(Japan) Nami Matsuyama (Japan) Chiharu Shida	21	21
(Japan) Ayane Kurihara (Japan) Naru Shinoya	21	21
2	(Japan) Naoko Fukuman (Japan) Kurumi Yonao	16	19

Final
4	(Japan) Nami Matsuyama (Japan) Chiharu Shida	21	21
(Japan) Ayane Kurihara (Japan) Naru Shinoya	10	17

=== Top half ===
==== Section 1 ====
First Round
1	(Japan) A Sakuramoto (Japan) Y Takahata	21	23	21
(Indonesia) Y Barkah (Indonesia) J F Sugiarto	10	25	8
(Hong Kong) Cheung Y M (Hong Kong) Tsang W C	14	11
(Chinese Taipei) Chang H-t (Chinese Taipei) Cheng C-y	21	21
5	(Malaysia) Lim C S (Malaysia) Tan S J	19	21	16
(Indonesia) F D Kusuma (Indonesia) R Sugiarto	21	12	21
(Japan) A Araki (Japan) R Imai	17	22	21
(Chinese Taipei) Tseng Y-c (Chinese Taipei) Ye J-y	21	20	12

Second Round
1	(Japan) A Sakuramoto (Japan) Y Takahata	21	21
(Chinese Taipei) Chang H-t (Chinese Taipei) Cheng C-y	9	9
(Indonesia) F D Kusuma (Indonesia) R Sugiarto	11	16
(Japan) A Araki (Japan) R Imai	21	21

Quarter-finals
1	(Japan) A Sakuramoto (Japan) Y Takahata	15	21	23
(Japan) A Araki (Japan) R Imai	21	19	21

==== Section 2 ====
First Round
4	(Japan) N Matsuyama (Japan) C Shida	21	16	21
(Chinese Taipei) Hung S-h (Chinese Taipei) Hung Y-t	13	21	18
(Chinese Taipei) Chang Y-t (Chinese Taipei) Wen H-y	21	21
Q4	(Chinese Taipei) Cheng Y-p (Chinese Taipei) Lin J-h	19	15
6	(Hong Kong) Ng T Y (Hong Kong) Yuen S Y	21	21
(Chinese Taipei) Chang C-h (Chinese Taipei) Yang C-t	11	17
Q1
(Chinese Taipei) Kuo Y-w (Chinese Taipei) Lin W-c	w	/	o

Second Round
4	(Japan) N Matsuyama (Japan) C Shida	21	21
(Chinese Taipei) Chang Y-t (Chinese Taipei) Wen H-y	13	18
6	(Hong Kong) Ng T Y (Hong Kong) Yuen S Y	21	21
(Chinese Taipei) Kuo Y-w (Chinese Taipei) Lin W-c	13	19

Quarter-finals
4	(Japan) N Matsuyama (Japan) C Shida	21	21
6	(Hong Kong) Ng T Y (Hong Kong) Yuen S Y	15	11

=== Bottom half ===
==== Section 3 ====
First Round
(Chinese Taipei) Cheng Y-c (Chinese Taipei) Hsieh P-s	21	18	9
Q3	(Hong Kong) Ng S Y (Hong Kong) Wu Y T	18	21	21
(Japan) R Kawashima (Japan) S Ozaki	21	21
7	(Chinese Taipei) Chen H-h (Chinese Taipei) Hu L-f	19	14
PFQ	(Chinese Taipei) Liu C-y (Chinese Taipei) Wu Y-c	15	10
(Japan) A Kurihara (Japan) N Shinoya	21	21
(Hong Kong) Ng W Y (Hong Kong) Yeung N T	17	22	21
3	(Chinese Taipei) Hsu Y-c (Chinese Taipei) Wu T-j	21	20	18

Second Round
Q3	(Hong Kong) Ng S Y (Hong Kong) Wu Y T	15	12
(Japan) R Kawashima (Japan) S Ozaki	21	21
(Japan) A Kurihara (Japan) N Shinoya	22	21
(Hong Kong) Ng W Y (Hong Kong) Yeung N T	20	15

Quarter-finals
(Japan) R Kawashima (Japan) S Ozaki	18	17
(Japan) A Kurihara (Japan) N Shinoya	21	21

==== Section 4 ====
First Round
(Indonesia) T O Kusumah (Indonesia) V A Sukoco	21	23
(Chinese Taipei) Lin Y-c (Chinese Taipei) Pai Y-p	19	21
(Chinese Taipei) Tai W-l (Chinese Taipei) Wu F-c	9	21	16
8	(Indonesia) A Imanuela (Indonesia) S F S Ramadhanti	21	17	21
(Indonesia) P H Mentari (Indonesia) R E Putri Sari	21	21
(Chinese Taipei) Peng L-t (Chinese Taipei) Yu C-h	16	13
Q2	(Chinese Taipei) Chung K-y (Chinese Taipei) Juang T-r	10	10
2	(Japan) N Fukuman (Japan) K Yonao	21	21

Second Round
(Indonesia) T O Kusumah (Indonesia) V A Sukoco	17	19
8	(Indonesia) A Imanuela (Indonesia) S F S Ramadhanti	21	21
(Indonesia) P H Mentari (Indonesia) R E Putri Sari	14	10
2	(Japan) N Fukuman (Japan) K Yonao	21	21

Quarter-finals
8	(Indonesia) A Imanuela (Indonesia) S F S Ramadhanti	12	6
2	(Japan) N Fukuman (Japan) K Yonao	21	21

== Mixed doubles ==
=== Seeds ===
1. (Chinese Taipei) Wang Chi-lin / Lee Chia-hsin (quarter-finals)
2. (Chinese Taipei) Lee Yang / Hsu Ya-ching (second round)
3. (Malaysia) Chen Tang Jie / Peck Yen Wei (semi-finals)
4. (Hong Kong) Chang Tak Ching / Ng Wing Yung (first round)
5. (Indonesia) Tontowi Ahmad / Winny Oktavina Kandow (withdrew)
6. (Indonesia) Rinov Rivaldy / Pitha Haningtyas Mentari (quarter-finals)
7. (Japan) Kohei Gondo / Ayane Kurihara (quarter-finals)
8. (Indonesia) Alfian Eko Prasetya / Marsheilla Gischa Islami (champions)

=== Finals ===
Semi-finals
(Chinese Taipei) Yang Po-hsuan (Chinese Taipei) Wu Ti-jung	12	21	21
3	(Malaysia) Chen Tang Jie (Malaysia) Peck Yen Wei	21	18	12
(Indonesia) Ronald Alexander (Indonesia) Annisa Saufika	16	16
8	(Indonesia) Alfian Eko Prasetya (Indonesia) Marsheilla Gischa Islami	21	21

Final
(Chinese Taipei) Yang Po-hsuan (Chinese Taipei) Wu Ti-jung	15	11
8	(Indonesia) Alfian Eko Prasetya (Indonesia) Marsheilla Gischa Islami	21	21

=== Top half ===
==== Section 1 ====
First Round
1	(Chinese Taipei) Wang C-l (Chinese Taipei) Lee C-h	21	21
Q1	(Chinese Taipei) Lin C-h (Chinese Taipei) Liu C-y	12	19
(Hong Kong) Mak H C (Hong Kong) Yeung N T	21	17	21
(Chinese Taipei) Lu C-p (Chinese Taipei) Yang C-t	14	21	9
PFQ	(Chinese Taipei) Hung Y-y (Chinese Taipei) Wen H-y	10	14
(Chinese Taipei) Yang P-h (Chinese Taipei) Wu T-j	21	21
(Chinese Taipei) Lee F-j (Chinese Taipei) Chang H-t	21	15	19
Q4	(Hong Kong) Yeung M N (Hong Kong) Ng T Y	19	21	21

Second Round
1	(Chinese Taipei) Wang C-l (Chinese Taipei) Lee C-h	21	16	21
(Hong Kong) Mak H C (Hong Kong) Yeung N T	12	21	14
(Chinese Taipei) Yang P-h (Chinese Taipei) Wu T-j	17	21	21
Q4	(Hong Kong) Yeung M N (Hong Kong) Ng T Y	21	18	18

Quarter-finals
1	(Chinese Taipei) Wang C-l (Chinese Taipei) Lee C-h	21	16	19
(Chinese Taipei) Yang P-h (Chinese Taipei) Wu T-j	17	21	21

==== Section 2 ====
First Round
3	(Malaysia) Chen T J (Malaysia) Peck Y W	13	21	21
(Hong Kong) Tam C H (Hong Kong) Ng S Y	21	15	16
(Chinese Taipei) Lee J-h (Chinese Taipei) Lee C-c	21	17	16
(Hong Kong) Chung Y (Hong Kong) Wu Y T	13	21	21
6	(Indonesia) R Rivaldy (Indonesia) P H Mentari	w	/	o
(United States) M Fogarty (United States) I Zhong
Q3	(Chinese Taipei) Tseng M-h (Chinese Taipei) Hsieh P-s	21	21
Q2	(Chinese Taipei) Chiang Y-w (Chinese Taipei) Chen P-y	14	12

Second Round
3	(Malaysia) Chen T J (Malaysia) Peck Y W	22	21
(Hong Kong) Chung Y (Hong Kong) Wu Y T	20	17
6	(Indonesia) R Rivaldy (Indonesia) P H Mentari	21	21
Q3	(Chinese Taipei) Tseng M-h (Chinese Taipei) Hsieh P-s	14	18

Quarter-finals
3	(Malaysia) Chen T J (Malaysia) Peck Y W	17	21	23
6	(Indonesia) R Rivaldy (Indonesia) P H Mentari	21	12	21

=== Bottom half ===
==== Section 3 ====
First Round
(Indonesia) A B Cahyono (Indonesia) S F S Ramadhanti	21	21
(Chinese Taipei) Lu C-y (Chinese Taipei) Hu L-f	10	9
(Malaysia) Hoo P R (Malaysia) Cheah Y S	16	17
7	(Japan) K Gondo (Japan) A Kurihara	21	21
(Chinese Taipei) Liao M-c (Chinese Taipei) Cheng Y-c	6	22
(Indonesia) R Alexander (Indonesia) A Saufika	21	24
(Chinese Taipei) Chang K-c (Chinese Taipei) Cheng C-y	21	21
4	(Hong Kong) Chang T C (Hong Kong) Ng W Y	15	16

Second Round
(Indonesia) A B Cahyono (Indonesia) S F S Ramadhanti	13	19
7	(Japan) K Gondo (Japan) A Kurihara	21	21
(Indonesia) R Alexander (Indonesia) A Saufika	21	21
(Chinese Taipei) Chang K-c (Chinese Taipei) Cheng C-y	14	19

Quarter-finals
7	(Japan) K Gondo (Japan) A Kurihara	12	19
(Indonesia) R Alexander (Indonesia) A Saufika	21	21

==== Section 4 ====
First Round
(Chinese Taipei) Lin Y-s (Chinese Taipei) Li Z-q	21	21
(Israel) M Zilberman (Israel) S Zilberman	13	13
(Chinese Taipei) Su C-h (Chinese Taipei) Ye J-y	21	14	11
8	(Indonesia) A E Prasetya (Indonesia) M G Islami	18	21	21
(Hong Kong) Ho W L (Hong Kong) Yuen S Y	11	16
(Chinese Taipei) Po L-w (Chinese Taipei) Chang C-h	21	21
(Hong Kong) Yeung S C (Hong Kong) Fan K Y	20	15
2	(Chinese Taipei) Lee Y (Chinese Taipei) Hsu Y-c	22	21

Second Round
(Chinese Taipei) Lin Y-s (Chinese Taipei) Li Z-q	18	15
8	(Indonesia) A E Prasetya (Indonesia) M G Islami	21	21
(Chinese Taipei) Po L-w (Chinese Taipei) Chang C-h	14	21	25
2	(Chinese Taipei) Lee Y (Chinese Taipei) Hsu Y-c	21	17	23

Quarter-finals
8	(Indonesia) A E Prasetya (Indonesia) M G Islami	21	21
(Chinese Taipei) Po L-w (Chinese Taipei) Chang C-h	17	17

Preceded by 2018 Korea Open	BWF World Tour; 2018 BWF season	Succeeded by 2018 Dutch Open
