= Liu Wei-chen =

Taiwanese badminton player

Liu Wei-chen 劉韋辰
Personal information
- Born: 29 October 1994 (age 32)

Sport
- Country: Taiwan
- Sport: Badminton

Men's & mixed doubles
- Highest ranking: 61 (MD) 21 Jul 2016; 209 (XD) 30 Jun 2016
- BWF profile

Liu Wei-chen (traditional Chinese: 劉韋辰; simplified Chinese: 刘韦辰; pinyin: Liú wéichén; born 29 October 1994) is a Taiwanese male badminton player. In 2015, he reach the final of the Sydney International Challenge tournament, but was defeated by the Malaysian pair in the rubber game with the score 2–1. He won his first international title at the 2016 Maurice's Pools and Spas Waikato International tournament in the men's doubles event partnered with Yang Po-han.

== Achievements ==
=== BWF International Challenge/Series ===
Men's Doubles
| Year | Tournament | Partner | Opponent | Score | Result |
|---|---|---|---|---|---|
| 2016 | Waikato International | (Chinese Taipei) Yang Po-han | (Chinese Taipei) Su Cheng-heng (Chinese Taipei) Yang Po-hsuan | 22-20, 21-10 | (gold) Winner |
| 2015 | Sydney International | (Chinese Taipei) Yang Po-han | (Malaysia) Jagdish Singh (Malaysia) Roni Tan Wee Long | 21-13, 17–21, 11-21 | (silver) Runner-up |

BWF International Challenge tournament
BWF International Series tournament
BWF Future Series tournament
