= 2019 New Zealand Open (badminton) =

Badminton championships

Tournament details
- Dates: 30 April – 5 May
- Level: Super 300
- Total prize money: US$150,000
- Venue: Eventfinda Stadium
- Location: Auckland, New Zealand

Champions
- Men's singles: (Indonesia) Jonatan Christie
- Women's singles: (South Korea) An Se-young
- Men's doubles: (Indonesia) Mohammad Ahsan (Indonesia) Hendra Setiawan
- Women's doubles: (South Korea) Kim So-yeong (South Korea) Kong Hee-yong
- Mixed doubles: (Malaysia) Chan Peng Soon (Malaysia) Goh Liu Ying

The 2019 New Zealand Open (officially known as the Barfoot & Thompson New Zealand Open 2019 for sponsorship reasons) was a badminton tournament which took place at Eventfinda Stadium in Auckland, New Zealand, from 30 April to 5 May 2019 and had a total purse of $150,000.

== Tournament ==
The 2019 New Zealand Open was the eleventh tournament of the 2019 BWF World Tour and also part of the New Zealand Open championships which had been held since 1990. This tournament was organized by the Badminton New Zealand and sanctioned by the BWF.

=== Venue ===
This international tournament was held at Eventfinda Stadium in Auckland, New Zealand.

=== Point distribution ===
Below is the point distribution table for each phase of the tournament based on the BWF points system for the BWF World Tour Super 300 event.

Winner	Runner-up	3/4	5/8	9/16	17/32	33/64	65/128
7,000	5,950	4,900	3,850	2,750	1,670	660	320

=== Prize money ===
The total prize money for this tournament was US$150,000. Distribution of prize money had in accordance with BWF regulations.

Event	Winner	Finals	Semi-finals	Quarter-finals	Last 16
Singles	$11,250	$5,700	$2,175	$900	$525
Doubles	$11,850	$5,700	$2,100	$1,087.50	$562.50

== Men's singles ==
=== Seeds ===
1. (Indonesia) Anthony Sinisuka Ginting (quarter-finals)
2. (Indonesia) Tommy Sugiarto (second round)
3. (Indonesia) Jonatan Christie (champion)
4. (Japan) Kenta Nishimoto (first round)
5. (Japan) Kanta Tsuneyama (semi-finals)
6. (Hong Kong) Ng Ka Long (final)
7. (China) Lin Dan (semi-finals)
8. (Thailand) Khosit Phetpradab (first round)

=== Wild card ===
Badminton New Zealand awarded a wild card entry to Abhinav Manota.

=== Finals ===
Semi-finals
7	(China) Lin Dan	13	11
6	(Hong Kong) Ng Ka Long	21	21
3	(Indonesia) Jonatan Christie	21	21
5	(Japan) Kanta Tsuneyama	12	15

Final
6	(Hong Kong) Ng Ka Long	12	13
3	(Indonesia) Jonatan Christie	21	21

=== Top half ===
==== Section 1 ====
First Round
1	(Indonesia) A S Ginting	21	21
(France) B Leverdez	19	17
Q2	(Malaysia) Chong W F	17	21	21
(Indonesia) I M Mustofa	21	13	16
7	(China) Lin D	21	21
WC	(New Zealand) A Manota	6	7
(India) B. Sai Praneeth	21	19	21
(India) S Dey	17	21	15

Second Round
1	(Indonesia) A S Ginting	21	21
Q2	(Malaysia) Chong W F	6	5
7	(China) Lin D	21	21
(India) B. Sai Praneeth	12	12

Quarter-finals
1	(Indonesia) A S Ginting	23	21	12
7	(China) Lin D	25	6	21

==== Section 2 ====
First Round
4	(Japan) K Nishimoto	18	12
(Malaysia) Lee Z J	21	21
(China) Zhou ZQ	21	11	15
(Japan) K Sakai	14	21	21
6	(Hong Kong) Ng K L	21	21
(Thailand) S Avihingsanon	14	13
Q3	(Malaysia) Soong J V	19	18
(South Korea) Lee H-i	21	21

Second Round
(Malaysia) Lee Z J	23	21
(Japan) K Sakai	21	16
6	(Hong Kong) Ng K L	21	21
(South Korea) Lee H-i	16	9

Quarter-finals
(Malaysia) Lee Z J	17	21	19
6	(Hong Kong) Ng K L	21	11	21

=== Bottom half ===
==== Section 3 ====
First Round
(China) Zhao JP	15	17
(South Korea) Heo K-h	21	21
Q4	(China) Sun FX	10	21	21
8	(Thailand) K Phetpradab	21	13	17
(Chinese Taipei) Wang T-w	15	21	21
Q1	(India) L Sen	21	18	10
(Indonesia) S H Rhustavito	12	10
3	(Indonesia) J Christie	21	21

Second Round
(South Korea) Heo K-h	25	16	11
Q4	(China) Sun FX	23	21	21
(Chinese Taipei) Wang T-w	14	21	16
3	(Indonesia) J Christie	21	14	21

Quarter-finals
Q4	(China) Sun FX	11	9
3	(Indonesia) J Christie	21	21

==== Section 4 ====
First Round
(China) Huang YX	18	7
(Thailand) S Thammasin	21	21
(Japan) Y Igarashi	18	19
5	(Japan) K Tsuneyama	21	21
(India) Prannoy H. S.	21	21
(Singapore) Loh K Y	15	14
(China) Lu GZ	11	15
2	(Indonesia) T Sugiarto	21	21

Second Round
(Thailand) S Thammasin	14	23
5	(Japan) K Tsuneyama	21	25
(India) Prannoy H. S.	21	21
2	(Indonesia) T Sugiarto	14	12

Quarter-finals
5	(Japan) K Tsuneyama	17	21	21
(India) Prannoy H. S.	21	15	14

== Women's singles ==
=== Seeds ===
1. (Japan) Akane Yamaguchi (semi-finals)
2. (India) Saina Nehwal (first round)
3. (United States) Beiwen Zhang (quarter-finals)
4. (Japan) Sayaka Takahashi (quarter-finals)
5. (Indonesia) Gregoria Mariska Tunjung (quarter-finals)
6. (China) Li Xuerui (final)
7. (Japan) Aya Ohori (semi-finals)
8. (China) Chen Xiaoxin (first round)

=== Wild card ===
Badminton New Zealand awarded a wild card entry to Sally Fu.

=== Finals ===
Semi-finals
1	(Japan) Akane Yamaguchi	21	19	13
6	(China) Li Xuerui	13	21	21
(South Korea) An Se-young	21	19	21
7	(Japan) Aya Ohori	17	21	13

Final
6	(China) Li Xuerui	19	15
(South Korea) An Se-young	21	21

=== Top half ===
==== Section 1 ====
First Round
1	(Japan) A Yamaguchi	21	21
(South Korea) Sim Y-j	17	19
Q4	(China) Wei YX	21	21
(United States) I Zhong	8	13
5	(Indonesia) G M Tunjung	21	21
(China) Zhang YM	16	12
Q3	(China) Li Y	21	17	21
(South Korea) Jeon J-i	15	21	12

Second Round
1	(Japan) A Yamaguchi	21	21
Q4	(China) Wei YX	11	16
5	(Indonesia) G M Tunjung	21	22
Q3	(China) Li Y	14	20

Quarter-finals
1	(Japan) A Yamaguchi	21	21
5	(Indonesia) G M Tunjung	14	15

==== Section 2 ====
First Round
4	(Japan) S Takahashi	21	21
(Singapore) Yeo J M	11	18
Q1	(England) E Beach	12	11
(South Korea) Kim H-m	21	21
6	(China) Li XR	21	21
PFQ	(India) A Prabhudesai	9	10
WC	(New Zealand) S Fu	5	16
(Indonesia) R Hartawan	21	21

Second Round
4	(Japan) S Takahashi	21	21
(South Korea) Kim H-m	11	13
6	(China) Li XR	21	21
(Indonesia) R Hartawan	16	13

Quarter-finals
4	(Japan) S Takahashi	10	18
6	(China) Li XR	21	21

=== Bottom half ===
==== Section 3 ====
First Round
Q2	(Australia) Qin JJ	21	21
(Australia) Chen H-y	17	12
(South Korea) An S-y	21	18	23
8	(China) Chen XX	18	21	21
(China) Ji ST	13	21	18
(Chinese Taipei) Chiang Y-l	21	19	21
(Malaysia) S Cheah S Y	21	15
3	(United States) BW Zhang	23	21

Second Round
Q2	(Australia) Qin JJ	12	15
(South Korea) An S-y	21	21
(Chinese Taipei) Chiang Y-l	12	21	19
3	(United States) BW Zhang	21	19	21

Quarter-finals
(South Korea) An S-y	17	21	21
3	(United States) BW Zhang	21	13	16

==== Section 4 ====
First Round
(Indonesia) Fitriani	21	21
PFQ	(Australia) L Ma	12	12
(Indonesia) Y Y Susanto	15	16
7	(Japan) A Ohori	21	21
(Indonesia) L A Mainaky	17	11
(Japan) S Kawakami	21	21
PFQ	(China) Wang ZY	21	21	21
2	(India) S Nehwal	16	23	4

Second Round
(Indonesia) Fitriani	11	6
7	(Japan) A Ohori	21	21
(Japan) S Kawakami	16	21	19
PFQ	(China) Wang ZY	21	14	21

Quarter-finals
7	(Japan) A Ohori	21	21	21
PFQ	(China) Wang ZY	16	23	12

== Men's doubles ==
=== Seeds ===
1. (Japan) Takeshi Kamura / Keigo Sonoda (semi-finals)
2. (Indonesia) Mohammad Ahsan / Hendra Setiawan (champions)
3. (Japan) Hiroyuki Endo / Yuta Watanabe (final)
4. (Japan) Takuto Inoue / Yuki Kaneko (quarter-finals)
5. (Chinese Taipei) Lee Yang / Wang Chi-lin (quarter-finals)
6. (Chinese Taipei) Liao Min-chun / Su Ching-heng (first round)
7. (Malaysia) Goh V Shem / Tan Wee Kiong (semi-finals)
8. (Malaysia) Aaron Chia / Soh Wooi Yik (quarter-finals)

=== Wild card ===
Badminton New Zealand awarded a wild card entry to Riga Oud / Daxxon Vong.

=== Finals ===
Semi-finals
1	(Japan) Takeshi Kamura (Japan) Keigo Sonoda	12	21
3	(Japan) Hiroyuki Endo (Japan) Yuta Watanabe	21	23
7	(Malaysia) Goh V Shem (Malaysia) Tan Wee Kiong	19	21	14
2	(Indonesia) Mohammad Ahsan (Indonesia) Hendra Setiawan	21	18	21

Final
3	(Japan) Hiroyuki Endo (Japan) Yuta Watanabe	22	15	17
2	(Indonesia) Mohammad Ahsan (Indonesia) Hendra Setiawan	20	21	21

=== Top half ===
==== Section 1 ====
First Round
1	(Japan) T Kamura (Japan) K Sonoda	21	21
PFR	(China) Chen SH (China) Fan QY	15	10
(Japan) A Koga (Japan) T Saito	22	21	21
(Malaysia) Goh S F (Malaysia) N Izzuddin	24	13	11
8	(Malaysia) A Chia (Malaysia) Soh W Y	21	21
PFQ	(Australia) S Leung (Australia) M Wheller	16	11
PFQ	(Japan) M Kaneko (Japan) Y Kubota	21	21
(Thailand) B Isara (Thailand) M Jongjit	16	12

Second Round
1	(Japan) T Kamura (Japan) K Sonoda	21	21
(Japan) A Koga (Japan) T Saito	15	19
8	(Malaysia) A Chia (Malaysia) Soh W Y	21	17	21
PFQ	(Japan) M Kaneko (Japan) Y Kubota	18	21	11

Quarter-finals
1	(Japan) T Kamura (Japan) K Sonoda	17	21	21
8	(Malaysia) A Chia (Malaysia) Soh W Y	21	15	10

==== Section 2 ====
First Round
3	(Japan) H Endo (Japan) Y Watanabe	21	21
PFQ	(Vietnam) Đỗ T Đ (Vietnam) Phạm H N	9	11
(Indonesia) S K Gutama (Indonesia) F W Putra	22	19
(Chinese Taipei) Lee J-h (Chinese Taipei) Yang P-hs	24	21
6	(Chinese Taipei) Liao M-c (Chinese Taipei) Su C-h	16	13
(Malaysia) Ong Y S (Malaysia) Teo E Y	21	21
(Indonesia) A B Cahyono (Indonesia) M R P Isfahani	21	21
Q4	(New Zealand) M Phillips (New Zealand) D Vong	12	9

Second Round
3	(Japan) H Endo (Japan) Y Watanabe	21	21
(Chinese Taipei) Lee J-h (Chinese Taipei) Yang P-hs	15	13
(Malaysia) Ong Y S (Malaysia) Teo E Y	21	21
(Indonesia) A B Cahyono (Indonesia) M R P Isfahani	13	15

Quarter-finals
3	(Japan) H Endo (Japan) Y Watanabe	21	21
(Malaysia) Ong Y S (Malaysia) Teo E Y	7	18

=== Bottom half ===
==== Section 3 ====
First Round
(India) M Attri (India) B. S Reddy	21	21
Q3	(New Zealand) J Feng (New Zealand) J Jiang	7	10
(Germany) M Lamsfuß (Germany) M Seidel	15	19
7	(Malaysia) Goh V S (Malaysia) Tan W K	21	21
Q1	(China) Dong WJ (China) Guo XW
PFQ	(China) Jiang ZB (China) Liang YW	w	/	o
PFQ	(China) Liang WK (China) Shang YC	9	12
4	(Japan) T Inoue (Japan) Y Kaneko	21	21

Second Round
(India) M Attri (India) B. S Reddy	17	19
7	(Malaysia) Goh V S (Malaysia) Tan W K	21	21
PFQ	(China) Jiang ZB (China) Liang YW	15	16
4	(Japan) T Inoue (Japan) Y Kaneko	21	21

Quarter-finals
7	(Malaysia) Goh V S (Malaysia) Tan W K	21	22	21
4	(Japan) T Inoue (Japan) Y Kaneko	18	24	12

==== Section 4 ====
First Round
WC	(New Zealand) R Oud (New Zealand) D Vong	21	20	21
Q2	(New Zealand) J Curtin (New Zealand) D Soedjasa	9	22	15
PFQ	(Indonesia) M S Fikri (Indonesia) B Maulana	17	14
5	(Chinese Taipei) Lee Y (Chinese Taipei) Wang C-l	21	21
(Japan) H Okamura (Japan) M Onodera	15	21	21
PFQ	(Hong Kong) Chang T C (Hong Kong) Yeung M N	21	17	14
PFR	(New Zealand) O Leydon-Davis (New Zealand) A Manota	17	15
2	(Indonesia) M Ahsan (Indonesia) H Setiawan	21	21

Second Round
WC	(New Zealand) R Oud (New Zealand) D Vong	8	6
5	(Chinese Taipei) Lee Y (Chinese Taipei) Wang C-l	21	21
(Japan) H Okamura (Japan) M Onodera	17	14
2	(Indonesia) M Ahsan (Indonesia) H Setiawan	21	21

Quarter-finals
5	(Chinese Taipei) Lee Y (Chinese Taipei) Wang C-l	21	19	14
2	(Indonesia) M Ahsan (Indonesia) H Setiawan	18	21	21

== Women's doubles ==
=== Seeds ===
1. (Japan) Yuki Fukushima / Sayaka Hirota (semi-finals)
2. (Japan) Misaki Matsutomo / Ayaka Takahashi (final)
3. (Japan) Mayu Matsumoto / Wakana Nagahara (quarter-finals)
4. (China) Chen Qingchen / Jia Yifan (withdrew)
5. (Indonesia) Greysia Polii / Apriyani Rahayu (withdrew)
6. (Japan) Shiho Tanaka / Koharu Yonemoto (second round)
7. (South Korea) Lee So-hee / Shin Seung-chan (withdrew)
8. (Bulgaria) Gabriela Stoeva / Stefani Stoeva (second round)

=== Wild card ===
Badminton New Zealand awarded a wild card entry to Sally Fu / Alyssa Tagle.

=== Finals ===
Semi-finals
1	(Japan) Yuki Fukushima (Japan) Sayaka Hirota	21	22	18
(South Korea) Kim So-yeong (South Korea) Kong Hee-yong	18	24	21
(China) Dong Wenjing (China) Feng Xueying	21	19
2	(Japan) Misaki Matsutomo (Japan) Ayaka Takahashi	23	21

Final
(South Korea) Kim So-yeong (South Korea) Kong Hee-yong	21	21
2	(Japan) Misaki Matsutomo (Japan) Ayaka Takahashi	15	18

=== Top half ===
==== Section 1 ====
First Round
1	(Japan) Y Fukushima (Japan) S Hirota	21	21
(Germany) L Efler (Germany) I Herttrich	17	6
(Malaysia) V Hoo (Malaysia) Yap C W	21	21
(Indonesia) Y Barkah (Indonesia) J F Sugiarto	15	17
8	(Bulgaria) G Stoeva (Bulgaria) S Stoeva	21	21
PFQ	(New Zealand) E Calder-Hawkins (New Zealand) A Pak	5	5
(Chinese Taipei) Hsu Y-c (Chinese Taipei) Hu L-f	13	15
(China) Du Y (China) Li YH	21	21

Second Round
1	(Japan) Y Fukushima (Japan) S Hirota	21	22
(Malaysia) V Hoo (Malaysia) Yap C W	18	20
8	(Bulgaria) G Stoeva (Bulgaria) S Stoeva	18	16
(China) Du Y (China) Li YH	21	21

Quarter-finals
1	(Japan) Y Fukushima (Japan) S Hirota	21	21
(China) Du Y (China) Li YH	18	14

==== Section 2 ====
First Round
3	(Japan) M Matsumoto (Japan) W Nagahara	21	21
(Malaysia) Chow M K (Malaysia) Lee M Y	16	15
(China) Liu XX (China) Xia YT	21	21	21
(India) A Ponnappa (India) N. S Reddy	14	23	14
6	(Japan) S Tanaka (Japan) K Yonemoto	21	21
Q1	(New Zealand) S Li (New Zealand) A Tan	5	4
WC	(New Zealand) S Fu (New Zealand) A Tagle	2	6
(South Korea) Kim S-y (South Korea) Kong H-y	21	21

Second Round
3	(Japan) M Matsumoto (Japan) W Nagahara	21	15	21
(China) Liu XX (China) Xia YT	12	21	18
6	(Japan) S Tanaka (Japan) K Yonemoto	15	18
(South Korea) Kim S-y (South Korea) Kong H-y	21	21

Quarter-finals
3	(Japan) M Matsumoto (Japan) W Nagahara	21	14	15
(South Korea) Kim S-y (South Korea) Kong H-y	11	21	21

=== Bottom half ===
==== Section 3 ====
First Round
Q2	(New Zealand) R H Fong (New Zealand) S Liao	17	19
Q4	(New Zealand) J Ng (New Zealand) J Villegas	21	21
(Chinese Taipei) Pai Y-p (Chinese Taipei) Wu T-j	11	17
PFQ	(China) Chen XF (China) Zhou CM	21	21
(Indonesia) A Imanuela (Indonesia) S F S Ramadhanti	12	13
(Japan) A Araki (Japan) R Imai	21	21
(China) Dong WJ (China) Feng XY	21	21
PFQ	(New Zealand) E Smith (New Zealand) J Yu	2	7

Second Round
Q4	(New Zealand) J Ng (New Zealand) J Villegas	10	8
PFQ	(China) Chen XF (China) Zhou CM	21	21
(Japan) A Araki (Japan) R Imai	11	11
(China) Dong WJ (China) Feng XY	21	21

Quarter-finals
PFQ	(China) Chen XF (China) Zhou CM	21	19	13
(China) Dong WJ (China) Feng XY	15	21	21

==== Section 4 ====
First Round
(Chinese Taipei) Chang C-h (Chinese Taipei) Yang C-t	21	21
PFQ	(New Zealand) R Apalisok (New Zealand) J Jiang	9	11
Q3	(New Zealand) V Wang (New Zealand) C Zhou	2	1
PFQ	(Japan) S Hobara (Japan) N Sone	21	21
(Indonesia) D D Haris (Indonesia) R A Pradipta	13	21	21
(Hong Kong) Ng W Y (Hong Kong) Yeung N T	21	19	15
(Australia) S Mapasa (Australia) G Somerville	10	7
2	(Japan) M Matsutomo (Japan) A Takahashi	21	21

Second Round
(Chinese Taipei) Chang C-h (Chinese Taipei) Yang C-t	15	13
PFQ	(Japan) S Hobara (Japan) N Sone	21	21
(Indonesia) D D Haris (Indonesia) R A Pradipta	13	11
2	(Japan) M Matsutomo (Japan) A Takahashi	21	21

Quarter-finals
PFQ	(Japan) S Hobara (Japan) N Sone	19	16
2	(Japan) M Matsutomo (Japan) A Takahashi	21	21

== Mixed doubles ==
=== Seeds ===
1. (Japan) Yuta Watanabe / Arisa Higashino (withdrew)
2. (Malaysia) Chan Peng Soon / Goh Liu Ying (champions)
3. (Malaysia) Goh Soon Huat / Shevon Jemie Lai (quarter-finals)
4. (Indonesia) Hafiz Faizal / Gloria Emanuelle Widjaja (semi-finals)
5. (Indonesia) Praveen Jordan / Melati Daeva Oktavianti (final)
6. (Indonesia) Rinov Rivaldy / Pitha Haningtyas Mentari (first round)
7. (Germany) Mark Lamsfuß / Isabel Herttrich (quarter-finals)
8. (Germany) Marvin Seidel / Linda Efler (first round)

=== Wild card ===
Badminton New Zealand awarded a wild card entry to Maika Phillips / Anona Pak.

=== Finals ===
Semi-finals
(Chinese Taipei) Wang Chi-lin (Chinese Taipei) Cheng Chi-ya	12	21
5	(Indonesia) Praveen Jordan (Indonesia) Melati Daeva Oktavianti	21	23
4	(Indonesia) Hafiz Faizal (Indonesia) Gloria Emanuelle Widjaja	14	18
2	(Malaysia) Chan Peng Soon (Malaysia) Goh Liu Ying	21	21

Final
5	(Indonesia) Praveen Jordan (Indonesia) Melati Daeva Oktavianti	14	21	27
2	(Malaysia) Chan Peng Soon (Malaysia) Goh Liu Ying	21	16	29

=== Top half ===
==== Section 1 ====
First Round
PFQ	(China) Dong WJ (China) Chen XF	21	20	21
PFQ	(Chinese Taipei) Lee Y (Chinese Taipei) Yang C-t	13	22	19
(Vietnam) Đỗ T Đ (Vietnam) Phạm N T	12	10
(Chinese Taipei) Wang C-l (Chinese Taipei) Cheng C-y	21	21
7	(Germany) M Lamsfuß (Germany) I Herttrich	21	21
(Australia) S Leung (Australia) G Somerville	19	8
(Japan) K Gondo (Japan) A Kurihara	21	21
(United States) M Fogarty (United States) I Zhong	15	10

Second Round
PFQ	(China) Dong WJ (China) Chen XF	21	19	14
(Chinese Taipei) Wang C-l (Chinese Taipei) Cheng C-y	12	21	21
7	(Germany) M Lamsfuß (Germany) I Herttrich	21	19	21
(Japan) K Gondo (Japan) A Kurihara	8	21	14

Quarter-finals
(Chinese Taipei) Wang C-l (Chinese Taipei) Cheng C-y	21	20	21
7	(Germany) M Lamsfuß (Germany) I Herttrich	19	22	17

==== Section 2 ====
First Round
3	(Malaysia) Goh S H (Malaysia) S J Lai	21	21
(Singapore) D B Chrisnanta (Singapore) Tan W H	11	17
PFR	(Chinese Taipei) Lee J-h (Chinese Taipei) Hsu Y-c	21	21
PFQ	(New Zealand) E Wong (New Zealand) J Yu	6	4
5	(Indonesia) P Jordan (Indonesia) M D Oktavianti	21	21
PFQ	(Hong Kong) Yeung M N (Hong Kong) Yeung N T	9	12
PFQ	(New Zealand) D Oud (New Zealand) J Ng	21	21
PFR	(New Zealand) J Feng (New Zealand) S Li	15	10

Second Round
3	(Malaysia) Goh S H (Malaysia) S J Lai	21	21
PFR	(Chinese Taipei) Lee J-h (Chinese Taipei) Hsu Y-c	10	19
5	(Indonesia) P Jordan (Indonesia) M D Oktavianti	21	21
PFQ	(New Zealand) D Oud (New Zealand) J Ng C M	12	12

Quarter-finals
3	(Malaysia) Goh S H (Malaysia) S J Lai	14	19
5	(Indonesia) P Jordan (Indonesia) M D Oktavianti	21	21

=== Bottom half ===
==== Section 3 ====
First Round
Q2	(New Zealand) D Vong (New Zealand) J Villegas	8	12
(Chinese Taipei) Yang P-hs (Chinese Taipei) Hu L-f	21	21
(Hong Kong) Chang T C (Hong Kong) Ng W Y	16	21	21
8	(Germany) M Seidel (Germany) L Efler	21	13	12
PFQ	(New Zealand) J Curtin (New Zealand) E Calder-Hawkins	17	14
PFQ	(Australia) M Wheller (Australia) Chen H-y	21	21
Q1	(New Zealand) R Oud (New Zealand) S Liao	8	11
4	(Indonesia) H Faizal (Indonesia) G E Widjaja	21	21

Second Round
(Chinese Taipei) Yang P-hs (Chinese Taipei) Hu L-f	19	21	13
(Hong Kong) Chang T C (Hong Kong) Ng W Y	21	18	21
PFQ	(Australia) M Wheller (Australia) Chen H-y	12	13
4	(Indonesia) H Faizal (Indonesia) G E Widjaja	21	21

Quarter-finals
(Hong Kong) Chang T C (Hong Kong) Ng W Y	15	17
4	(Indonesia) H Faizal (Indonesia) G E Widjaja	21	21

==== Section 4 ====
First Round
(Indonesia) A B Cahyono (Indonesia) A Saufika	21	21
WC	(New Zealand) M Phillips (New Zealand) A Pak	15	17
(Malaysia) Tan K M (Malaysia) Lai P J	21	21
6	(Indonesia) R Rivaldy (Indonesia) P H Mentari	18	14
(China) Guo XW (China) Liu XX	14^{r}
Q4	(New Zealand) E Lau (New Zealand) A Tagle	16
Q3	(Indonesia) H Kho Wibowo (Indonesia) Y Y Susanto	13	12
2	(Malaysia) Chan P S (Malaysia) Goh L Y	21	21

Second Round
(Indonesia) A B Cahyono (Indonesia) A Saufika	13	10
(Malaysia) Tan K M (Malaysia) Lai P J	21	21
Q4	(New Zealand) E Lau (New Zealand) A Tagle	17	15
2	(Malaysia) Chan P S (Malaysia) Goh L Y	21	21

Quarter-finals
(Malaysia) Tan K M (Malaysia) Lai P J	16	11
2	(Malaysia) Chan P S (Malaysia) Goh L Y	21	21

Preceded by 2019 Singapore Open	BWF World Tour; 2019 BWF season	Succeeded by 2019 Australian Open
