= 2019 Australian Open (badminton) =

Badminton championships

Tournament details
- Dates: 4–9 June
- Level: Super 300
- Total prize money: US$150,000
- Venue: Quaycentre
- Location: Sydney, Australia

Champions
- Men's singles: (Indonesia) Jonatan Christie
- Women's singles: (China) Chen Yufei
- Men's doubles: (South Korea) Ko Sung-hyun (South Korea) Shin Baek-cheol
- Women's doubles: (Japan) Yuki Fukushima (Japan) Sayaka Hirota
- Mixed doubles: (China) Wang Yilyu (China) Huang Dongping

The 2019 Australian Open (officially known as the Crown Group Australian Open 2019 for sponsorship reasons) was a badminton tournament which took place at Quaycentre in Sydney, Australia, from 4 to 9 June 2019 and had a total purse of $150,000.

== Tournament ==
The 2019 Australian Open was the twelfth tournament of the 2019 BWF World Tour and was also a part of the Australian Open championships which has been held since 1975. This tournament was organized by the Badminton Australia and sanctioned by the BWF.

=== Venue ===
This international tournament was held at Quaycentre in Sydney, Australia.

=== Point distribution ===
Below is the point distribution table for each phase of the tournament based on the BWF points system for the BWF World Tour Super 300 event.

Winner	Runner-up	3/4	5/8	9/16	17/32	33/64	65/128
7,000	5,950	4,900	3,850	2,750	1,670	660	320

=== Prize money ===
The total prize money for this tournament was US$150,000. Distribution of prize money was in accordance with BWF regulations.

Event	Winner	Finals	Semi-finals	Quarter-finals	Last 16
Singles	$11,250	$5,700	$2,175	$900	$525
Doubles	$11,850	$5,700	$2,100	$1,087.50	$562.50

== Men's singles ==
=== Seeds ===
1. (Chinese Taipei) Chou Tien-chen (semi-finals)
2. (Indonesia) Anthony Sinisuka Ginting (final)
3. (Indonesia) Jonatan Christie (champion)
4. (Japan) Kenta Nishimoto (first round)
5. (Japan) Kanta Tsuneyama (first round)
6. (India) Sameer Verma (second round)
7. (Indonesia) Tommy Sugiarto (quarter-finals)
8. (China) Lin Dan (quarter-finals)

=== Wild card ===
Badminton Australia awarded a wild card entry to Daniel Fan.

=== Finals ===
Semi-finals
1	(Chinese Taipei) Chou Tien-chen	20	21	16
3	(Indonesia) Jonatan Christie	22	13	21
(Chinese Taipei) Wang Tzu-wei	17	14
2	(Indonesia) Anthony Sinisuka Ginting	21	21

Final
3	(Indonesia) Jonatan Christie	21	13	21
2	(Indonesia) Anthony Sinisuka Ginting	17	21	14

=== Top half ===
==== Section 1 ====
First Round
1	(Chinese Taipei) Chou T-c	21	21
WC	(Australia) D Fan	11	7
(Indonesia) S H Rhustavito	16	5^{r}
(Malaysia) Liew D	21	7
5	(Japan) K Tsuneyama	19	17
(Thailand) S Thammasin	21	21
(Hong Kong) Wong W K	16	18
Q4	(Malaysia) Soong J V	21	21

Second Round
1	(Chinese Taipei) Chou T-c	21	21
(Malaysia) Liew D	17	17
(Thailand) S Thammasin	23	16
Q4	(Malaysia) Soong J V	25	21

Quarter-finals
1	(Chinese Taipei) Chou T-c	21	21
Q4	(Malaysia) Soong J V	14	8

==== Section 2 ====
First Round
3	(Indonesia) J Christie	21	21
(China) Lu GZ	18	15
Q3	(Thailand) T Saensomboonsuk	22	28
Q2	(Indonesia) C A Dwi Wardoyo	20	26
8	(China) Lin D	21	21
(India) Prannoy H. S.	18	19
(Thailand) S Avihingsanon	16	15
(India) Parupalli K	21	21

Second Round
3	(Indonesia) J Christie	21	21
Q3	(Thailand) T Saensomboonsuk	15	15
8	(China) Lin D	21	20	21
(India) Parupalli K	17	22	14

Quarter-finals
3	(Indonesia) J Christie	21	24
8	(China) Lin D	9	22

=== Bottom half ===
==== Section 3 ====
First Round
Q1	(Malaysia) Cheam J W	19	12
(Chinese Taipei) Wang T-w	21	21
(Malaysia) Lee Z J	15	21	12
6	(India) Sa Verma	21	16	21
(Japan) K Sakai	21	21
(Hong Kong) Lee C Y	17	15
(Thailand) K Wangcharoen	19	21	22
4	(Japan) K Nishimoto	21	18	20

Second Round
(Chinese Taipei) Wang T-w	21	7	21
6	(India) Sa Verma	16	21	13
(Japan) K Sakai	19	21	21
(Thailand) K Wangcharoen	21	15	17

Quarter-finals
(Chinese Taipei) Wang T-w	21	21
(Japan) K Sakai	18	16

==== Section 4 ====
First Round
PFQ	(Malaysia) Chong W F	12	17
PFQ	(Singapore) Loh K Y	21	21
(Hong Kong) Ng K L	12	18
7	(Indonesia) T Sugiarto	21	21
(India) B. Sai Praneeth	21	21
(South Korea) Lee D-k	16	14
(South Korea) Heo K-h	18	21	18
2	(Indonesia) A S Ginting	21	12	21

Second Round
PFQ	(Singapore) Loh K Y	19	22	15
7	(Indonesia) T Sugiarto	21	20	21
(India) B. Sai Praneeth	23	9
2	(Indonesia) A S Ginting	25	21

Quarter-finals
7	(Indonesia) T Sugiarto	6	0^{r}
2	(Indonesia) A S Ginting	21	0

== Women's singles ==
=== Seeds ===
1. (Japan) Nozomi Okuhara (final)
2. (China) Chen Yufei (champion)
3. (India) P. V. Sindhu (second round)
4. (Thailand) Ratchanok Intanon (semi-finals)
5. (South Korea) Sung Ji-hyun (quarter-finals)
6. (United States) Beiwen Zhang (second round)
7. (China) Li Xuerui (second round)
8. (Canada) Michelle Li (quarter-finals)

=== Wild card ===
Badminton Australia awarded a wild card entry to Chen Hsuan-yu.

=== Finals ===
Semi-finals
1	(Japan) Nozomi Okuhara	21	21
4	(Thailand) Ratchanok Intanon	17	15
(Thailand) Nitchaon Jindapol	10	25	6
2	(China) Chen Yufei	21	23	21

Final
1	(Japan) Nozomi Okuhara	15	3
2	(China) Chen Yufei	21	21

=== Top half ===
==== Section 1 ====
First Round
1	(Japan) N Okuhara	21	21
WC	(Australia) Chen H-y	19	13
Q3	(China) Ji ST	18	21	21
Q1	(South Korea) Kim H-m	21	8	11
6	(United States) BW Zhang	21	21
(Hong Kong) Yip P Y	19	8
(South Korea) Kim G-e	20	21	16
(Singapore) Yeo J M	22	9	21

Second Round
1	(Japan) N Okuhara	21	21
Q3	(China) Ji ST	13	7
6	(United States) BW Zhang	15	17
(Singapore) Yeo J M	21	21

Quarter-finals
1	(Japan) N Okuhara	21	21
(Singapore) Yeo J M	17	13

==== Section 2 ====
First Round
4	(Thailand) R Intanon	21	21
(Hong Kong) Deng X	13	17
(Malaysia) Goh J W	12	18
(Malaysia) S Cheah S Y	21	21
5	(South Korea) Sung J-h	21	21
(Japan) A Mine	9	13
(Hong Kong) Cheung N Y	21	21
Q4	(Indonesia) Y Y Susanto	12	6

Second Round
4	(Thailand) R Intanon	23	21	21
(Malaysia) S Cheah S Y	25	14	11
5	(South Korea) Sung J-h	13	21	21
(Hong Kong) Cheung N Y	21	12	18

Quarter-finals
4	(Thailand) R Intanon	21	21
5	(South Korea) Sung J-h	18	11

=== Bottom half ===
==== Section 3 ====
First Round
(Indonesia) L A Mainaky	12	12
(Thailand) B Ongbamrungphan	21	21
(Japan) S Takahashi	20	21	18
7	(China) Li XR	22	18	21
(Thailand) P Chochuwong	17	26	18
(Thailand) N Jindapol	21	24	21
Q2	(Indonesia) Choirunnisa	14	9
3	(India) P. V. Sindhu	21	21

Second Round
(Thailand) B Ongbamrungphan	18	22	21
7	(China) Li XR	21	20	6
(Thailand) N Jindapol	21	21
3	(India) P. V. Sindhu	19	18

Quarter-finals
(Thailand) B Ongbamrungphan	18	13
(Thailand) N Jindapol	21	21

==== Section 4 ====
First Round
(Indonesia) R Hartawan	17	18
(Japan) A Ohori	21	21
(Indonesia) G M Tunjung	21	18	13
8	(Canada) M Li	13	21	21
(Indonesia) Fitriani	15	22
(China) Zhang YM	21	24
(Japan) S Kawakami	13	15
2	(China) Chen YF	21	21

Second Round
(Japan) A Ohori	21	13	20
8	(Canada) M Li	18	21	22
(China) Zhang YM	18	7
2	(China) Chen YF	21	21

Quarter-finals
8	(Canada) M Li	19	11
2	(China) Chen YF	21	21

== Men's doubles ==
=== Seeds ===
1. (Japan) Takeshi Kamura / Keigo Sonoda (final)
2. (China) Li Junhui / Liu Yuchen (semi-finals)
3. (Indonesia) Mohammad Ahsan / Hendra Setiawan (quarter-finals)
4. (Indonesia) Fajar Alfian / Muhammad Rian Ardianto (first round)
5. (Japan) Hiroyuki Endo / Yuta Watanabe (first round)
6. (China) Han Chengkai / Zhou Haodong (quarter-finals)
7. (China) Liu Cheng / Zhang Nan (withdrew)
8. (Chinese Taipei) Liao Min-chun / Su Ching-heng (quarter-finals)

=== Wild card ===
Badminton Australia awarded a wild card entry to Simon Leung / Mitchell Wheller.

=== Finals ===
Semi-finals
1	(Japan) Takeshi Kamura (Japan) Keigo Sonoda	23	21	21
(South Korea) Choi Sol-gyu (South Korea) Seo Seung-jae	25	19	14
(South Korea) Ko Sung-hyun (South Korea) Shin Baek-cheol	21	14	21
2	(China) Li Junhui (China) Liu Yuchen	11	21	17

Final
1	(Japan) Takeshi Kamura (Japan) Keigo Sonoda	11	17
(South Korea) Ko Sung-hyun (South Korea) Shin Baek-cheol	21	21

=== Top half ===
==== Section 1 ====
First Round
1	(Japan) T Kamura (Japan) K Sonoda	21	19	21
(China) Ou XY (China) Ren XY	13	21	17
(Malaysia) Goh V S (Malaysia) Tan W K	18	19
(Japan) T Hoki (Japan) Y Kobayashi	21	21
PFQ	(Indonesia) A B Cahyono (Indonesia) M R P Isfahani	15	21	19
(China) He JT (China) Tan Q	21	18	21
WC	(Australia) S Leung (Australia) M Wheller	17	15
(Canada) J Ho-shue (Canada) N Yakura	21	21

Second Round
1	(Japan) T Kamura (Japan) K Sonoda	21	18	21
(Japan) T Hoki (Japan) Y Kobayashi	19	21	16
(China) He JT (China) Tan Q	21	21
(Canada) J Ho-shue (Canada) N Yakura	15	17

Quarter-finals
1	(Japan) T Kamura (Japan) K Sonoda	21	21
(China) He JT (China) Tan Q	12	15

==== Section 2 ====
First Round
4	(Indonesia) F Alfian (Indonesia) M R Ardianto	21	13	19
(South Korea) Choi S-g (South Korea) Seo S-j	17	21	21
Q3	(South Korea) Lee Y-d (South Korea) Yoo Y-s	18	21	16
(Indonesia) W Nayaka (Indonesia) A Yusuf	21	12	21
6	(China) Han CK (China) Zhou HD	21	21	21
(Japan) T Inoue (Japan) Y Kaneko	23	14	19
Q2	(Japan) M Kaneko (Japan) Y Kubota	16	19
(Malaysia) Goh S F (Malaysia) N Izzuddin M R	21	21

Second Round
(South Korea) Choi S-g (South Korea) Seo S-j	21	22	27
(Indonesia) W Nayaka (Indonesia) A Yusuf	17	24	25
6	(China) Han CK (China) Zhou HD	21	21
(Malaysia) Goh S F (Malaysia) N Izzuddin M R	17	18

Quarter-finals
(South Korea) Choi S-g (South Korea) Seo S-j	19	21	23
6	(China) Han CK (China) Zhou HD	21	16	21

=== Bottom half ===
==== Section 3 ====
First Round
(Indonesia) B Angriawan (Indonesia) Hardianto	21	21
PFQ	(Chinese Taipei) Lee J-h (Chinese Taipei) Yang P-h	18	15
(South Korea) Ko S-h (South Korea) Shin B-c	21	11	21
5	(Japan) H Endo (Japan) Y Watanabe	14	21	17
(Thailand) B Isara (Thailand) M Jongjit	14	18
(Chinese Taipei) Lee Y (Chinese Taipei) Wang C-l	21	21
(Malaysia) Ong Y S (Malaysia) Teo E Y	18	16
3	(Indonesia) M Ahsan (Indonesia) H Setiawan	21	21

Second Round
(Indonesia) B Angriawan (Indonesia) Hardianto	18	19
(South Korea) Ko S-h (South Korea) Shin B-c	21	21
(Chinese Taipei) Lee Y (Chinese Taipei) Wang C-l	11	9
3	(Indonesia) M Ahsan (Indonesia) H Setiawan	21	21

Quarter-finals
(South Korea) Ko S-h (South Korea) Shin B-c	21	21
3	(Indonesia) M Ahsan (Indonesia) H Setiawan	15	15

==== Section 4 ====
First Round
Q4	(Japan) H Okamura (Japan) M Onodera	22	19	16
Q1	(Japan) A Koga (Japan) T Saito	20	21	21
(Malaysia) A Chia (Malaysia) Soh W Y	12	21	15
8	(Chinese Taipei) Liao M-c (Chinese Taipei) Su C-h	21	15	21
(India) S Rankireddy (India) C Shetty	21	21
(India) M Attri (India) B. S Reddy	12	16
(Chinese Taipei) Lu C-y (Chinese Taipei) Yang P-h	21	19	15
2	(China) Li JH (China) Liu YC	15	21	21

Second Round
Q1	(Japan) A Koga (Japan) T Saito	13	19
8	(Chinese Taipei) Liao M-c (Chinese Taipei) Su C-h	21	21
(India) S Rankireddy (India) C Shetty	19	18
2	(China) Li JH (China) Liu YC	21	21

Quarter-finals
8	(Chinese Taipei) Liao M-c (Chinese Taipei) Su C-h	19	12
2	(China) Li JH (China) Liu YC	21	21

== Women's doubles ==
=== Seeds ===
1. (Japan) Mayu Matsumoto / Wakana Nagahara (quarter-finals)
2. (Japan) Yuki Fukushima / Sayaka Hirota (champions)
3. (China) Chen Qingchen / Jia Yifan (final)
4. (Japan) Misaki Matsutomo / Ayaka Takahashi (semi-finals)
5. (Indonesia) Greysia Polii / Apriyani Rahayu (semi-finals)
6. (South Korea) Lee So-hee / Shin Seung-chan (quarter-finals)
7. (Japan) Shiho Tanaka / Koharu Yonemoto (first round)
8. (China) Du Yue / Li Yinhui (second round)

=== Finals ===
Semi-finals
5	(Indonesia) Greysia Polii (Indonesia) Apriyani Rahayu	13	21	18
3	(China) Chen Qingchen (China) Jia Yifan	21	14	21
4	(Japan) Misaki Matsutomo (Japan) Ayaka Takahashi	21	15	21
2	(Japan) Yuki Fukushima (Japan) Sayaka Hirota	15	21	23

Final
3	(China) Chen Qingchen (China) Jia Yifan	10	16
2	(Japan) Yuki Fukushima (Japan) Sayaka Hirota	21	21

=== Top half ===
==== Section 1 ====
First Round
1	(Japan) M Matsumoto (Japan) W Nagahara	22	21
(Hong Kong) Ng T Y (Hong Kong) Yuen S Y	20	14
(Japan) N Matsuyama (Japan) C Shida	21	21
(China) Dong WJ (China) Feng XY	17	14
5	(Indonesia) G Polii (Indonesia) A Rahayu	21	21
(Canada) R Honderich (Canada) K Tsai	13	14
(South Korea) Baek H-n (South Korea) Kim H-r	21	21
(India) A Ponnappa (India) N. S Reddy	14	13

Second Round
1	(Japan) M Matsumoto (Japan) W Nagahara	21	28
(Japan) N Matsuyama (Japan) C Shida	8	26
5	(Indonesia) G Polii (Indonesia) A Rahayu	21	21
(South Korea) Baek H-n (South Korea) Kim H-r	11	12

Quarter-finals
1	(Japan) M Matsumoto (Japan) W Nagahara	19	18
5	(Indonesia) G Polii (Indonesia) A Rahayu	21	21

==== Section 2 ====
First Round
3	(China) Chen QC (China) Jia YF	21	21
(Malaysia) Chow M K (Malaysia) Lee M Y	11	17
(Thailand) C Chaladchalam (Thailand) P Muenwong	21	21
Q4	(Chinese Taipei) Hsieh P-s (Chinese Taipei) Lin X-m	15	15
6	(South Korea) Lee S-h (South Korea) Shin S-c	21	21	21
(China) Li WM (China) Zheng Y	17	23	15
Q3	(Chinese Taipei) Lee C-h (Chinese Taipei) Lin J-y	21	8	14
Q1	(Chinese Taipei) Hsu Y-c (Chinese Taipei) Hu L-f	15	21	21

Second Round
3	(China) Chen QC (China) Jia YF	21	21
(Thailand) C Chaladchalam (Thailand) P Muenwong	17	15
6	(South Korea) Lee S-h (South Korea) Shin S-c	21	21
Q1	(Chinese Taipei) Hsu Y-c (Chinese Taipei) Hu L-f	13	19

Quarter-finals
3	(China) Chen QC (China) Jia YF	15	21	21
6	(South Korea) Lee S-h (South Korea) Shin S-c	21	19	17

=== Bottom half ===
==== Section 3 ====
First Round
(South Korea) Kim S-y (South Korea) Kong H-y	21	21
(Indonesia) D D Haris (Indonesia) R A Pradipta	13	11
(Indonesia) Y Barkah (Indonesia) J F Sugiarto	11	8
8	(China) Du Y (China) Li YH	21	21
(Thailand) J Kititharakul (Thailand) R Prajongjai	21	21
(Australia) S Mapasa (Australia) G Somerville	11	10
(Indonesia) A Imanuela (Indonesia) S F S Ramadhanti	7	11
4	(Japan) M Matsutomo (Japan) A Takahashi	21	21

Second Round
(South Korea) Kim S-y (South Korea) Kong H-y	21	21
8	(China) Du Y (China) Li YH	13	16
(Thailand) J Kititharakul (Thailand) R Prajongjai	10	11
4	(Japan) M Matsutomo (Japan) A Takahashi	21	21

Quarter-finals
(South Korea) Kim S-y (South Korea) Kong H-y	12	19
4	(Japan) M Matsutomo (Japan) A Takahashi	21	21

==== Section 4 ====
First Round
(China) Liu XX (China) Xia YT	21	18	21
Q2	(Chinese Taipei) Pai Y-p (Chinese Taipei) Wu T-j	19	21	18
(Japan) A Sakuramoto (Japan) Y Takahata	21	15	24
7	(Japan) S Tanaka (Japan) K Yonemoto	17	21	22
(Malaysia) V Hoo K M (Malaysia) Yap C W	17	18
(South Korea) Chang Y-n (South Korea) Jung K-e	21	21
(Hong Kong) Ng W Y (Hong Kong) Yeung N T	13	10
2	(Japan) Y Fukushima (Japan) S Hirota	21	21

Second Round
(China) Liu XX (China) Xia YT	13	12
(Japan) A Sakuramoto (Japan) Y Takahata	21	21
(South Korea) Chang Y-n (South Korea) Jung K-e	19	21	15
2	(Japan) Y Fukushima (Japan) S Hirota	21	16	21

Quarter-finals
(Japan) A Sakuramoto (Japan) Y Takahata	13	4
2	(Japan) Y Fukushima (Japan) S Hirota	21	21

== Mixed doubles ==
=== Seeds ===
1. (China) Wang Yilyu / Huang Dongping (champions)
2. (Japan) Yuta Watanabe / Arisa Higashino (semi-finals)
3. (Malaysia) Chan Peng Soon / Goh Liu Ying (quarter-finals)
4. (Indonesia) Hafiz Faizal / Gloria Emanuelle Widjaja (quarter-finals)
5. (South Korea) Seo Seung-jae / Chae Yoo-jung (first round)
6. (Indonesia) Praveen Jordan / Melati Daeva Oktavianti (final)
7. (England) Chris Adcock / Gabby Adcock (quarter-finals)
8. (China) He Jiting / Du Yue (second round)

=== Wild card ===
Badminton Australia awarded a wild card entry to Simon Leung / Gronya Somerville.

=== Finals ===
Semi-finals
1	(China) Wang Yilyu (China) Huang Dongping	21	21
(Hong Kong) Tang Chun Man (Hong Kong) Tse Ying Suet	13	10
6	(Indonesia) Praveen Jordan (Indonesia) Melati Daeva Oktavianti	21	12	21
2	(Japan) Yuta Watanabe (Japan) Arisa Higashino	13	21	17

Final
1	(China) Wang Yilyu (China) Huang Dongping	21	21
6	(Indonesia) Praveen Jordan (Indonesia) Melati Daeva Oktavianti	15	8

=== Top half ===
==== Section 1 ====
First Round
1	(China) Wang YL (China) Huang DP	21	21
(Chinese Taipei) Tseng M-h (Chinese Taipei) Hsieh P-s	14	12
(Japan) T Hoki (Japan) W Nagahara	21	21
(Chinese Taipei) Lee J-h (Chinese Taipei) Hsu Y-c	13	19
7	(England) C Adcock (England) G Adcock	21	21	21
(China) Lu K (China) Chen L	17	23	19
(Indonesia) A B Cahyono (Indonesia) A Saufika	21	17	21
(Chinese Taipei) Lu C-y (Chinese Taipei) Lee C-h	19	21	17

Second Round
1	(China) Wang YL (China) Huang DP	21	21
(Japan) T Hoki (Japan) W Nagahara	18	8
7	(England) C Adcock (England) G Adcock	21	21
(Indonesia) A B Cahyono (Indonesia) A Saufika	16	14

Quarter-finals
1	(China) Wang YL (China) Huang DP	21	21
7	(England) C Adcock (England) G Adcock	11	17

==== Section 2 ====
First Round
4	(Indonesia) H Faizal (Indonesia) G E Widjaja	21	21
Q3	(Chinese Taipei) Yang P-h (Chinese Taipei) Hu L-f	17	16
(Indonesia) T Ahmad (Indonesia) W O Kandow	19	20
(Hong Kong) Chang T C (Hong Kong) Ng W Y	21	22
5	(South Korea) Seo S-j (South Korea) Chae Y-j	16	16
(Hong Kong) Tang C M (Hong Kong) Tse Y S	21	21
Q4	(Australia) HD Tang (Australia) J Vega	9	8
(Malaysia) Tan K M (Malaysia) Lai P J	21	21

Second Round
4	(Indonesia) H Faizal (Indonesia) G E Widjaja	19	21	21
(Hong Kong) Chang T C (Hong Kong) Ng W Y	21	7	11
(Hong Kong) Tang C M (Hong Kong) Tse Y S	21	19	22
(Malaysia) Tan K M (Malaysia) Lai P J	18	21	20

Quarter-finals
4	(Indonesia) H Faizal (Indonesia) G E Widjaja	20	14
(Hong Kong) Tang C M (Hong Kong) Tse Y S	22	21

=== Bottom half ===
==== Section 3 ====
First Round
(India) S Rankireddy (India) A Ponnappa	17	21	16
(Chinese Taipei) Wang C-l (Chinese Taipei) Cheng C-y	21	12	21
(Japan) K Gondo (Japan) A Kurihara	21	11
6	(Indonesia) P Jordan (Indonesia) M D Oktavianti	23	21
(Canada) J Hurlburt-Yu (Canada) J Wu	21	13	14
(China) Ren XY (China) Zhou CM	18	21	21
Q1	(Hong Kong) Yeung M N (Hong Kong) Yeung N T	21	15
3	(Malaysia) Chan P S (Malaysia) Goh L Y	23	21

Second Round
(Chinese Taipei) Wang C-l (Chinese Taipei) Cheng C-y	18	21	11
6	(Indonesia) P Jordan (Indonesia) M D Oktavianti	21	12	21
(China) Ren XY (China) Zhou CM	19	15
3	(Malaysia) Chan P S (Malaysia) Goh L Y	21	21

Quarter-finals
6	(Indonesia) P Jordan (Indonesia) M D Oktavianti	21	22
3	(Malaysia) Chan P S (Malaysia) Goh L Y	18	20

==== Section 4 ====
First Round
(South Korea) Choi S-g (South Korea) Shin S-c	18	14
Q2	(South Korea) Ko S-h (South Korea) Eom H-w	21	21
WC	(Australia) S Leung (Australia) G Somerville	18	9
8	(China) He JT (China) Du Y	21	21
(China) Ou XY (China) Feng XY	21	17	19
(Chinese Taipei) Lee Y (Chinese Taipei) Yang C-t	16	21	21
PFQ	(United States) M Fogarty (United States) I Zhong	4	2
2	(Japan) Y Watanabe (Japan) A Higashino	21	21

Second Round
Q4	(South Korea) Ko S-h (South Korea) Eom H-w	22	21
8	(China) He JT (China) Du Y	20	14
(Chinese Taipei) Lee Y (Chinese Taipei) Yang C-t	10	10
2	(Japan) Y Watanabe (Japan) A Higashino	21	21

Quarter-finals
Q4	(South Korea) Ko S-h (South Korea) Eom H-w	19	21	19
2	(Japan) Y Watanabe (Japan) A Higashino	21	14	21

Preceded by 2018 Australian Open	Australian Open	Succeeded by 2022 Australian Open
Preceded by 2019 New Zealand Open	BWF World Tour; 2019 BWF season	Succeeded by 2019 Canada Open
