= 2019 German Open (badminton) =

Badminton tournament in Mülheim

Tournament details
- Dates: 26 February – 3 March
- Edition: 62nd
- Level: Super 300
- Total prize money: US$150,000
- Venue: Innogy Sporthalle
- Location: Mülheim, Germany

Champions
- Men's singles: (Japan) Kento Momota
- Women's singles: (Japan) Akane Yamaguchi
- Men's doubles: (Japan) Hiroyuki Endo (Japan) Yuta Watanabe
- Women's doubles: (China) Du Yue (China) Li Yinhui
- Mixed doubles: (South Korea) Seo Seung-jae (South Korea) Chae Yoo-jung

The 2019 German Open (officially known as the Yonex German Open 2020 for sponsorship reasons) was a badminton tournament that took place at the Innogy Sporthalle in Mülheim, Germany, from 26 February to 3 March 2019 and had a total prize of $150,000.

== Tournament ==
The 2019 German Open was the fifth tournament of the 2019 BWF World Tour and also part of the German Open championships, which had been held since 1955. This tournament was organized by the German Badminton Association and sanctioned by the BWF.

=== Venue ===
This international tournament was held at the Innogy Sporthalle in Mülheim, North Rhine-Westphalia, Germany.

=== Point distribution ===
Below is the point distribution table for each phase of the tournament based on the BWF points system for the BWF World Tour Super 300 event.

Winner	Runner-up	3/4	5/8	9/16	17/32	33/64	65/128
7,000	5,950	4,900	3,850	2,750	1,670	660	320

=== Prize money ===
The total prize money for this tournament was US$150,000. Distribution of prize money was in accordance with BWF regulations.

Event	Winner	Finals	Semi-finals	Quarter-finals	Last 16
Singles	$11,250	$5,700	$2,175	$900	$525
Doubles	$11,850	$5,700	$2,100	$1,087.50	$562.50

== Men's singles ==
=== Seeds ===
1. (Japan) Kento Momota (champion)
2. (Chinese Taipei) Chou Tien-chen (semi-finals)
3. (Japan) Kenta Nishimoto (final)
4. (China) Lin Dan (second round)
5. (Hong Kong) Ng Ka Long (second round)
6. (Thailand) Khosit Phetpradab (first round)
7. (Japan) Kanta Tsuneyama (quarter-finals)
8. (Thailand) Kantaphon Wangcharoen (quarter-finals)

=== Finals ===
Semi-finals
1	(Japan) Kento Momota	24	21	21
(Denmark) Hans-Kristian Vittinghus	26	16	15
3	(Japan) Kenta Nishimoto	21	18	21
2	(Chinese Taipei) Chou Tien-chen	15	21	16

Final
1	(Japan) Kento Momota	21	21
3	(Japan) Kenta Nishimoto	10	16

=== Top half ===
==== Section 1 ====
First Round
1	(Japan) K Momota	21	21
(Chinese Taipei) Wang T-w	18	15
(France) B Leverdez	21	10	21
(Hong Kong) Wong W K	17	21	17
7	(Japan) K Tsuneyama	21	22
(India) A Jayaram	12	20
(China) Zhao JP	21	18	21
(France) T J Popov	18	21	17

Second Round
1	(Japan) K Momota	21	17	21
(France) B Leverdez	14	21	11
7	(Japan) K Tsuneyama	21	21
(China) Zhao JP	15	7

Quarter-finals
1	(Japan) K Momota	21	21
7	(Japan) K Tsuneyama	12	9

==== Section 2 ====
First Round
4	(China) Lin D	21	25
(China) Lu GZ	16	23
PFQ	(Thailand) T Saensomboonsuk	13	15
(Denmark) H-K Vittinghus	21	21
6	(Thailand) K Phetpradab	11	10
Q1	(Malaysia) Soong J V	21	21
Q4	(Chinese Taipei) Lu C-h	17	21	21
(Denmark) V Svendsen	21	18	16

Second Round
4	(China) Lin D	21	19	13
(Denmark) H-K Vittinghus	16	21	21
Q1	(Malaysia) Soong J V	21	10	21
Q4	(Chinese Taipei) Lu C-h	16	21	13

Quarter-finals
(Denmark) H-K Vittinghus	21	18	21
Q1	(Malaysia) Soong J V	13	21	15

=== Bottom half ===
==== Section 3 ====
First Round
Q3	(Denmark) R Messerschmidt	14	3
(Israel) M Zilberman	21	21
(India) S Dey	12	15
8	(Thailand) K Wangcharoen	21	21
Q2	(France) T Rouxel	17	17
(Thailand) S Thammasin	21	21
(Brazil) Y Coelho	17	16
3	(Japan) K Nishimoto	21	21

Second Round
(Israel) M Zilberman	17	13
8	(Thailand) K Wangcharoen	21	21
(Thailand) S Thammasin	16	12
3	(Japan) K Nishimoto	21	21

Quarter-finals
8	(Thailand) K Wangcharoen	16	20
3	(Japan) K Nishimoto	21	22

==== Section 4 ====
First Round
(Netherlands) M Caljouw	21	8	16
(Malaysia) Lee Z J	19	21	21
(Thailand) S Avihingsanon	19	17
5	(Hong Kong) Ng K L	21	21
(Hong Kong) Lee C Y	21	21
(Japan) K Sakai	8	16
(China) Zhou ZQ	19	12
2	(Chinese Taipei) Chou T-c	21	21

Second Round
(Malaysia) Lee Z J	21	12	21
5	(Hong Kong) Ng K L	19	21	16
(Hong Kong) Lee C Y	21	16	8
2	(Chinese Taipei) Chou T-c	17	21	21

Quarter-finals
(Malaysia) Lee Z J	18	20
2	(Chinese Taipei) Chou T-c	21	22

== Women's singles ==
=== Seeds ===
1. (Japan) Nozomi Okuhara (semi-finals)
2. (Japan) Akane Yamaguchi (champion)
3. (Thailand) Ratchanok Intanon (final)
4. (United States) Beiwen Zhang (quarter-finals)
5. (Japan) Sayaka Takahashi (quarter-finals)
6. (Canada) Michelle Li (first round)
7. (Indonesia) Gregoria Mariska Tunjung (first round)
8. (China) Han Yue (first round)

=== Finals ===
Semi-finals
1	(Japan) Nozomi Okuhara	15	12
3	(Thailand) Ratchanok Intanon	21	21
(Malaysia) Goh Jin Wei	14	11
2	(Japan) Akane Yamaguchi	21	21

Final
3	(Thailand) Ratchanok Intanon	21	14	23
2	(Japan) Akane Yamaguchi	16	21	25

=== Top half ===
==== Section 1 ====
First Round
1	(Japan) N Okuhara	21	21
(Denmark) L Kjærsfeldt	8	10
(Hong Kong) Deng X	21	17	16
(Denmark) M Blichfeldt	16	21	21
6	(Canada) M Li	21	19
(Japan) A Ohori	23	21
(Germany) Y Li	21	21
(Indonesia) L A Mainaky	12	15

Second Round
1	(Japan) N Okuhara	21	23	21
(Denmark) M Blichfeldt	17	25	10
(Japan) A Ohori	21	21
(Germany) Y Li	13	11

Quarter-finals
1	(Japan) N Okuhara	21	21
(Japan) A Ohori	11	13

==== Section 2 ====
First Round
3	(Thailand) R Intanon	21	1
(China) Chen XX	19	1^{r}
Q3	(South Korea) Kim H-m	19	6
(Thailand) N Jindapol	21	21
7	(Indonesia) G M Tunjung	21	16	16
Q1	(Indonesia) R Hartawan	16	21	21
(Malaysia) S Cheah S Y	10	16
(Singapore) Yeo J M	21	21

Second Round
3	(Thailand) R Intanon	21	21
(Thailand) N Jindapol	12	16
Q1	(Indonesia) R Hartawan	20	10
(Singapore) Yeo J M	22	21

Quarter-finals
3	(Thailand) R Intanon	21	21
(Singapore) Yeo J M	7	12

=== Bottom half ===
==== Section 3 ====
First Round
(China) Zhang YM	21	18	18
(Malaysia) Goh J W	18	21	21
(South Korea) Kim G-e	20	23	21
8	(China) Han Y	22	21	12
(Thailand) B Ongbamrungphan	21	21
Q2	(Turkey) A Demirbağ	13	11
(China) Cai YY	10	16
4	(United States) BW Zhang	21	21

Second Round
(Malaysia) Goh J W	10	21	23
(South Korea) Kim G-e	21	12	21
(Thailand) B Ongbamrungphan	17	11
4	(United States) BW Zhang	21	21

Quarter-finals
(Malaysia) Goh J W	21	19	21
4	(United States) BW Zhang	19	21	16

==== Section 4 ====
First Round
(Indonesia) Fitriani	21	21
(Hong Kong) Yip P Y	19	10
(Thailand) P Chochuwong	11	15
5	(Japan) S Takahashi	21	21
(Hong Kong) Cheung N Y	21	21
Q4	(Turkey) N Yiğit	7	14
(China) Li XR	12	21
2	(Japan) A Yamaguchi	21	23

Second Round
(Indonesia) Fitriani	21	20	18
5	(Japan) S Takahashi	12	22	21
(Hong Kong) Cheung N Y	19	14
2	(Japan) A Yamaguchi	21	21

Quarter-finals
5	(Japan) S Takahashi	19	20
2	(Japan) A Yamaguchi	21	22

== Men's doubles ==
=== Seeds ===
1. (Japan) Takeshi Kamura / Keigo Sonoda (final)
2. (Japan) Hiroyuki Endo / Yuta Watanabe (champions)
3. (China) Han Chengkai / Zhou Haodong (second round)
4. (Japan) Takuto Inoue / Yuki Kaneko (first round)
5. (China) He Jiting / Tan Qiang (quarter-finals)
6. (Chinese Taipei) Liao Min-chun / Su Ching-heng (first round)
7. (China) Liu Cheng / Zhang Nan (second round)
8. (Malaysia) Aaron Chia / Soh Wooi Yik (quarter-finals)

=== Finals ===
Semi-finals
1	(Japan) Takeshi Kamura (Japan) Keigo Sonoda	21	0
(Thailand) Bodin Isara (Thailand) Maneepong Jongjit	11	0^{r}
(Malaysia) Goh Sze Fei (Malaysia) Nur Izzuddin Mohd Rumsani	10	12
2	(Japan) Hiroyuki Endo (Japan) Yuta Watanabe	21	21

Final
1	(Japan) Takeshi Kamura (Japan) Keigo Sonoda	21	11	12
2	(Japan) Hiroyuki Endo (Japan) Yuta Watanabe	15	21	21

=== Top half ===
==== Section 1 ====
First Round
1	(Japan) T Kamura (Japan) K Sonoda	21	21
Q4	(Thailand) I Apisuk (Thailand) T Viriyangkura	19	8
(South Korea) Ko S-h (South Korea) Shin B-c	21	21
PFQ	(Indonesia) S K Gutama (Indonesia) F W Putra	18	18
7	(China) Liu C (China) Zhang N	21	21	22
(Japan) T Hoki (Japan) Y Kobayashi	23	19	20
(South Korea) Kim W-h (South Korea) Seo S-j	21	21
(Netherlands) J Arends (Netherlands) R Jille	14	19

Second Round
1	(Japan) T Kamura (Japan) K Sonoda	12	21	21
(South Korea) Ko S-h (South Korea) Shin B-c	21	16	18
7	(China) Liu C (China) Zhang N	17	21	17
(South Korea) Kim W-h (South Korea) Seo S-j	21	14	21

Quarter-finals
1	(Japan) T Kamura (Japan) K Sonoda	21	21
(South Korea) Kim W-h (South Korea) Seo S-j	19	12

==== Section 2 ====
First Round
4	(Japan) T Inoue (Japan) Y Kaneko	17	18
(Thailand) B Isara (Thailand) M Jongjit	21	21
(China) Ou XY (China) Ren XY	17	19
(Chinese Taipei) Lee Y (Chinese Taipei) Wang C-l	21	21
5	(China) He JT (China) Tan Q	21	21
(Thailand) T Isriyanet (Thailand) K Namdash	14	10
(Russia) V Ivanov (Russia) I Sozonov	21	23
(Canada) J Ho-Shue (Canada) N Yakura	12	21

Second Round
(Thailand) B Isara (Thailand) M Jongjit	21	21
(Chinese Taipei) Lee Y (Chinese Taipei) Wang C-l	16	17
5	(China) He JT (China) Tan Q	16	21	21
(Russia) V Ivanov (Russia) I Sozonov	21	19	17

Quarter-finals
(Thailand) B Isara (Thailand) M Jongjit	21	21
5	(China) He JT (China) Tan Q	12	11

=== Bottom half ===
==== Section 3 ====
First Round
(Netherlands) J Maas (Netherlands) R Tabeling	21	25
Q3	(Russia) V Durkin (Russia) N Ukk	8	23
(Malaysia) M Arif A L (Malaysia) N M Azriyn A	16	17
8	(Malaysia) A Chia (Malaysia) Soh W Y	21	21
Q1	(Denmark) D Daugaard (Denmark) F Søgaard	11	17
(Malaysia) Goh S F (Malaysia) N Izzuddin	21	21
(Thailand) K Kedren (Thailand) D Puavaranukroh	17	15
3	(China) Han CK (China) Zhou HD	21	21

Second Round
(Netherlands) J Maas (Netherlands) R Tabeling	17	17
8	(Malaysia) A Chia (Malaysia) Soh W Y	21	21
(Malaysia) Goh S F (Malaysia) N Izzuddin	21	17	21
3	(China) Han CK (China) Zhou HD	16	21	16

Quarter-finals
8	(Malaysia) A Chia (Malaysia) Soh W Y	20	18
(Malaysia) Goh S F (Malaysia) N Izzuddin	22	21

==== Section 4 ====
First Round
Q2	(Poland) M Bochat (Poland) A Cwalina	15	15
(Germany) M Lamsfuß (Germany) M Seidel	21	21
(Malaysia) Ong Y S (Malaysia) Teo E Y	16	21	21
6	(Chinese Taipei) Liao M-c (Chinese Taipei) Su C-h	21	14	15
(Chinese Taipei) Lu C-y (Chinese Taipei) Yang P-h	21	21
(Denmark) M Bay-Smidt (Denmark) L Mølhede	8	10
(China) Huang KX (China) Wang ZK	12	10
2	(Japan) H Endo (Japan) Y Watanabe	21	21

Second Round
(Germany) M Lamsfuß (Germany) M Seidel	12	21
(Malaysia) Ong Y S (Malaysia) Teo E Y	21	23
(Chinese Taipei) Lu C-y (Chinese Taipei) Yang P-h	14	11
2	(Japan) H Endo (Japan) Y Watanabe	21	21

Quarter-finals
(Malaysia) Ong Y S (Malaysia) Teo E Y	21	12
2	(Japan) H Endo (Japan) Y Watanabe	23	21

== Women's doubles ==
=== Seeds ===
1. (Japan) Yuki Fukushima / Sayaka Hirota (semi-finals)
2. (Japan) Misaki Matsutomo / Ayaka Takahashi (final)
3. (Japan) Mayu Matsumoto / Wakana Nagahara (semi-finals)
4. (Indonesia) Greysia Polii / Apriyani Rahayu (quarter-finals)
5. (China) Chen Qingchen / Jia Yifan (quarter-finals)
6. (Japan) Shiho Tanaka / Koharu Yonemoto (first round)
7. (Bulgaria) Gabriela Stoeva / Stefani Stoeva (quarter-finals)
8. (China) Du Yue / Li Yinhui (champions)

=== Finals ===
Semi-finals
1	(Japan) Yuki Fukushima (Japan) Sayaka Hirota	18	21	19
8	(China) Du Yue (China) Li Yinhui	21	18	21
3	(Japan) Mayu Matsumoto (Japan) Wakana Nagahara	16	21	14
2	(Japan) Misaki Matsutomo (Japan) Ayaka Takahashi	21	19	21

Final
8	(China) Du Yue (China) Li Yinhui	22	21
2	(Japan) Misaki Matsutomo (Japan) Ayaka Takahashi	20	15

=== Top half ===
==== Section 1 ====
First Round
1	(Japan) Y Fukushima (Japan) S Hirota	21	21
(Indonesia) D D Haris (Indonesia) T O Kusumah	14	10
Q3	(Denmark) A Bøje (Denmark) R Søby Hansen	10	14
(Indonesia) N K Istarani (Indonesia) R A Pradipta	21	21
5	(China) Chen QC (China) Jia YF	19	21	21
(China) Cao TW (China) Yu XH	21	11	14
(China) Dong WJ (China) Feng XY	21	10	21
(Russia) E Bolotova (Russia) A Davletova	15	21	16

Second Round
1	(Japan) Y Fukushima (Japan) S Hirota	22	21
(Indonesia) N K Istarani (Indonesia) R A Pradipta	20	7
5	(China) Chen QC (China) Jia YF	21	21
(China) Dong WJ (China) Feng XY	14	11

Quarter-finals
1	(Japan) Y Fukushima (Japan) S Hirota	22	21
5	(China) Chen QC (China) Jia YF	20	7

==== Section 2 ====
First Round
4	(Indonesia) G Polii (Indonesia) A Rahayu	21	21
(Chinese Taipei) Hsu Y-c (Chinese Taipei) Hu L-f	18	15
Q1	(Netherlands) D Jille (Netherlands) I van der Aar	10	7
(China) Li WM (China) Zheng Y	21	21
8	(China) Du Y (China) Li YH	21	21
Q2	(Belgium) L Jaques (Belgium) F Vandenhoucke	10	14
(Netherlands) S Piek (Netherlands) C Seinen	17	23	21
(Sweden) E Karlsson (Sweden) J Magnusson	21	21	6

Second Round
4	(Indonesia) G Polii (Indonesia) A Rahayu	21	21
(China) Li WM (China) Zheng Y	16	19
8	(China) Du Y (China) Li YH	21	21
(Netherlands) S Piek (Netherlands) C Seinen	17	9

Quarter-finals
4	(Indonesia) G Polii (Indonesia) A Rahayu	17	18
8	(China) Du Y (China) Li YH	21	21

=== Bottom half ===
==== Section 3 ====
First Round
(Hong Kong) Ng W Y (Hong Kong) Yeung N T	21	21
(Germany) J Goliszewski (Germany) L Käpplein	19	14
PFQ	(Germany) L Efler (Germany) I Herttrich	19	15
7	(Bulgaria) G Stoeva (Bulgaria) S Stoeva	21	21
(Hong Kong) Ng T Y (Hong Kong) Yuen S Y	16	21	21
Q4	(Chinese Taipei) Chang C-h (Chinese Taipei) Yang C-t	21	11	8
(Turkey) B Erçetin (Turkey) N İnci	11	9
3	(Japan) M Matsumoto (Japan) W Nagahara	21	21

Second Round
(Hong Kong) Ng W Y (Hong Kong) Yeung N T	11	21	14
7	(Bulgaria) G Stoeva (Bulgaria) S Stoeva	21	16	21
(Hong Kong) Ng T Y (Hong Kong) Yuen S Y	17	17
3	(Japan) M Matsumoto (Japan) W Nagahara	21	21

Quarter-finals
7	(Bulgaria) G Stoeva (Bulgaria) S Stoeva	13	21	13
3	(Japan) M Matsumoto (Japan) W Nagahara	21	18	21

==== Section 4 ====
First Round
(Malaysia) Chow M K (Malaysia) Lee M Y	21	21
(India) M Jakkampudi (India) P S. Ram	15	16
(South Korea) Baek H-n (South Korea) Kim H-r	23	21
6	(Japan) S Tanaka (Japan) K Yonemoto	21	18
(Thailand) P Supajirakul (Thailand) S Taerattanachai	21	21
(Malaysia) V Hoo (Malaysia) Yap C W	17	15
(South Korea) Kim S-y (South Korea) Kong H-y	14	21	12
2	(Japan) M Matsutomo (Japan) A Takahashi	21	19	21

Second Round
(Malaysia) Chow M K (Malaysia) Lee M Y	21	21	13
(South Korea) Baek H-n (South Korea) Kim H-r	19	23	21
(Thailand) P Supajirakul (Thailand) S Taerattanachai	19	22	13^{r}
2	(Japan) M Matsutomo (Japan) A Takahashi	21	20	12

Quarter-finals
(South Korea) Baek H-n (South Korea) Kim H-r	21	18	19
2	(Japan) M Matsutomo (Japan) A Takahashi	17	21	21

== Mixed doubles ==
=== Seeds ===
1. (Japan) Yuta Watanabe / Arisa Higashino (quarter-finals)
2. (Thailand) Dechapol Puavaranukroh / Sapsiree Taerattanachai (quarter-finals)
3. (Malaysia) Chan Peng Soon / Goh Liu Ying (first round)
4. (China) He Jiting / Du Yue (quarter-finals)
5. (Malaysia) Goh Soon Huat / Shevon Jemie Lai (semi-finals)
6. (Indonesia) Hafiz Faizal / Gloria Emanuelle Widjaja (final)
7. (Indonesia) Praveen Jordan / Melati Daeva Oktavianti (first round)
8. (South Korea) Seo Seung-jae / Chae Yoo-jung (champions)

=== Finals ===
Semi-finals
Q4	(Netherlands) Robin Tabeling (Netherlands) Selena Piek	21	13	21
6	(Indonesia) Hafiz Faizal (Indonesia) Gloria Emanuelle Widjaja	16	21	23
5	(Malaysia) Goh Soon Huat (Malaysia) Shevon Jemie Lai	17	12
8	(South Korea) Seo Seung-jae (South Korea) Chae Yoo-jung	21	21

Final
6	(Indonesia) Hafiz Faizal (Indonesia) Gloria Emanuelle Widjaja	17	11
8	(South Korea) Seo Seung-jae (South Korea) Chae Yoo-jung	21	21

=== Top half ===
==== Section 1 ====
First Round
1	(Japan) Y Watanabe (Japan) A Higashino	21	21
(Thailand) N Phuangphuapet (Thailand) S Amitrapai	7	10
(Germany) M Seidel (Germany) L Efler	17	21	15
(Denmark) M Mikkelsen (Denmark) M Surrow	21	15	21
7	(Indonesia) P Jordan (Indonesia) M D Oktavianti	19	18
Q4	(Netherlands) R Tabeling (Netherlands) S Piek	21	21
(Japan) Y Kaneko (Japan) M Matsutomo	21	21
(Japan) K Gondo (Japan) A Kurihara	15	12

Second Round
1	(Japan) Y Watanabe (Japan) A Higashino	21	21
(Denmark) M Mikkelsen (Denmark) M Surrow	18	11
Q4	(Netherlands) R Tabeling (Netherlands) S Piek	22	21
(Japan) Y Kaneko (Japan) M Matsutomo	20	18

Quarter-finals
1	(Japan) Y Watanabe (Japan) A Higashino	21	18	15
Q4	(Netherlands) R Tabeling (Netherlands) S Piek	19	21	21

==== Section 2 ====
First Round
3	(Malaysia) Chan P S (Malaysia) Goh L Y	21	17	15
(Russia) E Dremin (Russia) E Dimova	18	21	21
(South Korea) Choi S-g (South Korea) Kim S-y	25	14
(Chinese Taipei) Wang C-l (Chinese Taipei) Cheng C-y	27	21
6	(Indonesia) H Faizal (Indonesia) G E Widjaja	21	21
Q1	(Netherlands) R Jille (Netherlands) I Van der Aar	5	14
(Indonesia) T Ahmad (Indonesia) W O Kandow	21	21
(Malaysia) Chen T J (Malaysia) Peck Y W	6	14

Second Round
(Russia) E Dremin (Russia) E Dimova	12	21	15
(Chinese Taipei) Wang C-l (Chinese Taipei) Cheng C-y	21	14	21
6	(Indonesia) H Faizal (Indonesia) G E Widjaja	21	28
(Indonesia) T Ahmad (Indonesia) W O Kandow	13	26

Quarter-finals
(Chinese Taipei) Wang C-l (Chinese Taipei) Cheng C-y	14	15
6	(Indonesia) H Faizal (Indonesia) G E Widjaja	21	21

=== Bottom half ===
==== Section 3 ====
First Round
(Netherlands) J Arends (Netherlands) C Seinen	15	21	19
(Russia) R Alimov (Russia) A Davletova	21	16	21
(Japan) T Hoki (Japan) W Nagahara	17	19
5	(Malaysia) Goh S H (Malaysia) S J Lai	21	21
(China) Ren XY (China) Zhou CM	21	21
(Republic of Ireland) S Magee (Republic of Ireland) C Magee	14	17
Q2	(France) G Mittelheisser (France) A Mittelheisser	15	14
4	(China) He JT (China) Du Y	21	21

Second Round
(Russia) R Alimov (Russia) A Davletova
5	(Malaysia) Goh S H (Malaysia) S J Lai	w	/	o
(China) Ren XY (China) Zhou CM	15	20
4	(China) He JT (China) Du Y	21	22

Quarter-finals
5	(Malaysia) Goh S H (Malaysia) S J Lai	23	21
4	(China) He JT (China) Du Y	21	16

==== Section 4 ====
First Round
(Indonesia) A E Prasetya (Indonesia) M G Islami	21	18	21
(Hong Kong) Chang T C (Hong Kong) Ng W Y	19	21	11
Q3	(Chinese Taipei) Chang K-c (Chinese Taipei) Lee C-c	11	14
8	(South Korea) Seo S-j (South Korea) Chae Y-j	21	21
(Indonesia) R Rivaldy (Indonesia) P H Mentari	20	21	21
(Malaysia) Tan K M (Malaysia) Lai P J	22	18	15
(Germany) M Lamsfuß (Germany) I Herttrich	14	20
2	(Thailand) D Puavaranukroh (Thailand) S Taerattanachai	21	22

Second Round
(Indonesia) A E Prasetya (Indonesia) M G Islami	14	11
8	(South Korea) Seo S-j (South Korea) Chae Y-j	21	21
(Indonesia) R Rivaldy (Indonesia) P H Mentari	12	16
2	(Thailand) D Puavaranukroh (Thailand) S Taerattanachai	21	21

Quarter-finals
8	(South Korea) Seo S-j (South Korea) Chae Y-j	21	14	21
2	(Thailand) D Puavaranukroh (Thailand) S Taerattanachai	10	21	19

Preceded by 2019 Spain Masters	BWF World Tour; 2019 BWF season	Succeeded by 2019 All England Open
