= 2019 Spain Masters =

Badminton championships

Tournament details
- Dates: 19–24 February
- Edition: 2nd
- Level: Super 300
- Total prize money: US$150,000
- Venue: Pavelló de la Vall d'Hebron
- Location: Barcelona, Spain

Champions
- Men's singles: (Denmark) Viktor Axelsen
- Women's singles: (Denmark) Mia Blichfeldt
- Men's doubles: (Chinese Taipei) Lee Yang (Chinese Taipei) Wang Chi-lin
- Women's doubles: (South Korea) Kim So-yeong (South Korea) Kong Hee-yong
- Mixed doubles: (South Korea) Seo Seung-jae (South Korea) Chae Yoo-jung

The 2019 Spain Masters (officially known as the Barcelona Spain Masters 2019) was a badminton tournament which took place at the Pavelló de la Vall d'Hebron in Barcelona, Spain, from 19 to 24 February 2019 with a total prize purse of $150,000.

== Tournament ==
The 2019 Spain Masters was the fourth tournament of the 2019 BWF World Tour and also part of the Spain Masters championships, which had been held since 2018. This tournament was organized by the Spanish Badminton Federation and was sanctioned by the BWF.

=== Venue ===
This international tournament was held at the Pavelló de la Vall d'Hebron in Barcelona, Spain.

=== Point distribution ===
Below is the point distribution table for each phase of the tournament based on the BWF points system for the BWF World Tour Super 300 event.

Winner	Runner-up	3/4	5/8	9/16	17/32	33/64	65/128
7,000	5,950	4,900	3,850	2,750	1,670	660	320

=== Prize money ===
The total prize money for this tournament was US$150,000. Distribution of prize money was in accordance with BWF regulations.

Event	Winner	Finals	Semi-finals	Quarter-finals	Last 16
Singles	$11,250	$5,700	$2,175	$900	$525
Doubles	$11,850	$5,700	$2,100	$1,087.50	$562.50

== Men's singles ==
=== Seeds ===
1. (Denmark) Viktor Axelsen (champion)
2. (Denmark) Rasmus Gemke (withdrew)
3. (Denmark) Anders Antonsen (final)
4. (China) Lu Guangzu (withdrew)
5. (Denmark) Jan Ø. Jørgensen (first round)
6. (Chinese Taipei) Wang Tzu-wei (quarter-finals)
7. (Denmark) Hans-Kristian Vittinghus (second round)
8. (England) Rajiv Ouseph (quarter-finals)

=== Finals ===
Semi-finals
1	(Denmark) Viktor Axelsen	21	17	5
Q4	(China) Ren Pengbo	9	21	4^{r}
3	(Denmark) Anders Antonsen	21	9	21
(China) Zhao Junpeng	7	21	17

Final
1	(Denmark) Viktor Axelsen	21	21
3	(Denmark) Anders Antonsen	14	11

=== Top half ===
==== Section 1 ====
First Round
1	(Denmark) V Axelsen	21	21
(Chinese Taipei) Lu C-h	11	11
(Malaysia) Cheam J W	21	16	17
(India) A Jayaram	18	21	21
5	(Denmark) J Ø. Jørgensen	17	19
PFQ	(Singapore) Loh K Y	21	21
(India) Parupalli K	27	21
(Hong Kong) Wong W K	25	18

Second Round
1	(Denmark) V Axelsen	21	21
(India) A Jayaram	19	16
PFQ	(Singapore) Loh K Y	21	18	21
(India) Parupalli K	12	21	15

Quarter-finals
1	(Denmark) V Axelsen	21	21
PFQ	(Singapore) Loh K Y	13	10

==== Section 2 ====
First Round
PFQ	(Spain) L E Peñalver	15	16
(India) S Verma	21	21
Q4	(China) Ren PB	21	21
(Brazil) Y Coelho	12	10
7	(Denmark) H-K Vittinghus	21	17	21
Q1	(France) C Popov	14	21	16
(Spain) P Abián	21	21
Q3	(Germany) K Schäfer	13	14

Second Round
(India) S Verma	17	13
Q4	(China) Ren PB	21	21
7	(Denmark) H-K Vittinghus	19	21	18
(Spain) P Abián	21	14	21

Quarter-finals
Q4	(China) Ren PB	18	21	21
(Spain) P Abián	21	14	18

=== Bottom half ===
==== Section 3 ====
First Round
(Thailand) T Saensomboonsuk	25	21
(France) T J Popov	23	17
(Israel) M Zilberman	21	11	15
8	(England) R Ouseph	17	21	21
PFQ	(Malaysia) I Zulkarnain	16	13
(Russia) V Malkov	21	21
(Hong Kong) Lee C Y	13	18
3	(Denmark) A Antonsen	21	21

Second Round
(Thailand) T Saensomboonsuk	21	18	17
8	(England) R Ouseph	19	21	21
(Russia) V Malkov	17	14
3	(Denmark) A Antonsen	21	21

Quarter-finals
8	(England) R Ouseph	15	16
3	(Denmark) A Antonsen	21	21

==== Section 4 ====
First Round
Q2	(Finland) I Heino	21	21	21
(India) S Dey	23	15	19
(France) T Rouxel	21	10	17
6	(Chinese Taipei) Wang T-w	17	21	21
(Canada) J Ho-Shue	21	17	10
(China) Zhou ZQ	13	21	21
(China) Zhao JP	21	21
PFQ	(France) L Claerbout	15	11

Second Round
Q2	(Finland) I Heino	14	13
6	(Chinese Taipei) Wang T-w	21	21
(China) Zhou ZQ	21	12	14
(China) Zhao JP	15	21	21

Quarter-finals
6	(Chinese Taipei) Wang T-w	20	20
(China) Zhao JP	22	22

== Women's singles ==
=== Seeds ===
1. (China) Han Yue (semi-finals)
2. (Denmark) Mia Blichfeldt (champion)
3. (China) Cai Yanyan (semi-finals)
4. (Denmark) Line Kjærsfeldt (final)
5. (China) Li Xuerui (second round)
6. (China) Chen Xiaoxin (first round)
7. (Scotland) Kirsty Gilmour (first round)
8. (Japan) Sayaka Sato (withdrew)

=== Finals ===
Semi-finals
1	(China) Han Yue	21	15	20
4	(Denmark) Line Kjærsfeldt	18	21	22
3	(China) Cai Yanyan	16	21	13
2	(Denmark) Mia Blichfeldt	21	13	21

Final
4	(Denmark) Line Kjærsfeldt	14	14
2	(Denmark) Mia Blichfeldt	21	21

=== Top half ===
==== Section 1 ====
First Round
1	(China) Han Y	21	21
Q3	(Russia) V Vorobeva	12	9
(Indonesia) R Hartawan	18	21	21
(Canada) B Tam	21	16	8
PFQ	(India) M Agrey	21	21
PFQ	(Netherlands) S de Visch Eijbergen	19	16
(Chinese Taipei) Pai Y-p	10	16
Q2	(United States) N Chi	21	21

Second Round
1	(China) Han Y	21	21	21
(Indonesia) R Hartawan	23	18	15
PFQ	(India) M Agrey	21	13	21
Q2	(United States) N Chi	14	21	16

Quarter-finals
1	(China) Han Y	21	21
PFQ	(India) M Agrey	12	4

==== Section 2 ====
First Round
4	(Denmark) L Kjærsfeldt	23	21
(Russia) E Kosetskaya	21	16
(Chinese Taipei) Chiang Y-l	21	21
(Bulgaria) L Zetchiri	16	13
5	(China) Li XR	21	21
(Israel) K Polikarpova	14	7
(South Korea) Kim G-e	17	18
(Singapore) Yeo J M	21	21

Second Round
4	(Denmark) L Kjærsfeldt	21	21
(Chinese Taipei) Chiang Y-l	15	15
5	(China) Li XR	16	17
(Singapore) Yeo J M	21	21

Quarter-finals
4	(Denmark) L Kjærsfeldt	21	21
(Singapore) Yeo J M	10	18

=== Bottom half ===
==== Section 3 ====
First Round
(Chinese Taipei) Sung S-y	21	12	21
(France) Qi XF	13	21	10
(Hong Kong) Deng X	21	21	21
7	(Scotland) K Gilmour	18	23	11
(South Korea) Kim H-m	13	21	8
(Indonesia) Fitriani	21	18	21
Q1	(Mauritius) K Foo Kune	14	11
3	(China) Cai YY	21	21

Second Round
(Chinese Taipei) Sung S-y	14	12
(Hong Kong) Deng X	21	21
(Indonesia) Fitriani	14	19
3	(China) Cai YY	21	21

Quarter-finals
(Hong Kong) Deng X	18	21	19
3	(China) Cai YY	21	17	21

==== Section 4 ====
First Round
(Chinese Taipei) Lee C-h	21	21
(England) C Birch	14	11
(Indonesia) L A Mainaky	4
6	(China) Chen XX	1^{r}
Q4	(Chinese Taipei) Chen S-y	22	8	21
(Germany) Y Li	20	21	10
(Switzerland) S Jaquet	8	15
2	(Denmark) M Blichfeldt	21	21

Second Round
(Chinese Taipei) Lee C-h	17	19
(Indonesia) L A Mainaky	21	21
Q4	(Chinese Taipei) Chen S-y	14	15
2	(Denmark) M Blichfeldt	21	21

Quarter-finals
(Indonesia) L A Mainaky	15	13
2	(Denmark) M Blichfeldt	21	21

== Men's doubles ==
=== Seeds ===
1. (Denmark) Kim Astrup / Anders Skaarup Rasmussen (quarter-finals)
2. (England) Marcus Ellis / Chris Langridge (quarter-finals)
3. (Denmark) Mathias Boe / Carsten Mogensen (semi-finals)
4. (Chinese Taipei) Lu Ching-yao / Yang Po-han (semi-finals)
5. (Chinese Taipei) Lee Yang / Wang Chi-lin (champions)
6. (China) Ou Xuanyi / Ren Xiangyu (withdrew)
7. (Germany) Mark Lamsfuß / Marvin Seidel (quarter-finals)
8. (South Korea) Kim Won-ho / Seo Seung-jae (final)

=== Finals ===
Semi-finals
5	(Chinese Taipei) Lee Yang (Chinese Taipei) Wang Chi-lin	21	26
3	(Denmark) Mathias Boe (Denmark) Carsten Mogensen	16	24
4	(Chinese Taipei) Lu Ching-yao (Chinese Taipei) Yang Po-han	8	21	20
8	(South Korea) Kim Won-ho (South Korea) Seo Seung-jae	21	18	22

Final
5	(Chinese Taipei) Lee Yang (Chinese Taipei) Wang Chi-lin	21	23
8	(South Korea) Kim Won-ho (South Korea) Seo Seung-jae	8	21

=== Top half ===
==== Section 1 ====
First Round
1	(Denmark) K Astrup (Denmark) A S Rasmussen	21	21
(Chinese Taipei) Chang K-c (Chinese Taipei) Po L-w	14	11
(Canada) J Ho-Shue (Canada) N Yakura	21	21
Q4	(Spain) B Amaya (Spain) M Gallardo	9	10
5	(Chinese Taipei) Lee Y (Chinese Taipei) Wang C-l	21	21
(United States) P Chew (United States) R Chew	10	14
(China) Huang KX (China) Wang ZK	w	/	o
Q2

Second Round
1	(Denmark) K Astrup (Denmark) A S Rasmussen	21	21
(Canada) J Ho-Shue (Canada) N Yakura	11	8
5	(Chinese Taipei) Lee Y (Chinese Taipei) Wang C-l	21	17	21
(China) Huang KX (China) Wang ZK	10	21	14

Quarter-finals
1	(Denmark) K Astrup (Denmark) A S Rasmussen	15	15
5	(Chinese Taipei) Lee Y (Chinese Taipei) Wang C-l	21	21

==== Section 2 ====
First Round
3	(Denmark) M Boe (Denmark) C Mogensen	21	21
Q1	(Spain) P Alfayate (Spain) J Molares	9	4
(France) C Popov (France) T J Popov	19	19
(India) K P Garaga (India) D Kapila	21	21
PFQ	(Chinese Taipei) Lin C-y (Chinese Taipei) Yang M-t	21	21
(Algeria) M A Belarbi (Algeria) A Hamek	9	9
(England) P Briggs (England) G Mairs	21	18	13
(Malaysia) Goh S F (Malaysia) N Izzudin	15	21	21

Second Round
3	(Denmark) M Boe (Denmark) C Mogensen	21	21
(India) K P Garaga (India) D Kapila	17	14
PFQ	(Chinese Taipei) Lin C-y (Chinese Taipei) Yang M-t	21	18	9
(Malaysia) Goh S F (Malaysia) N Izzudin	19	21	21

Quarter-finals
3	(Denmark) M Boe (Denmark) C Mogensen	22	18	21
(Malaysia) Goh S F (Malaysia) N Izzudin	20	21	19

=== Bottom half ===
==== Section 3 ====
First Round
(Denmark) M P Kolding (Denmark) N Nøhr	20	23	22
Q3	(Chinese Taipei) Lee J-h (Chinese Taipei) Yang P-hs	22	21	20
(Denmark) M Bay-Smidt (Denmark) L Mølhede
7	(Germany) M Lamsfuß (Germany) M Seidel	w	/	o
(England) B Lane (England) S Vendy	19	16
(Indonesia) S K Gutama (Indonesia) F W Putra	21	21
(Republic of Ireland) J Magee (Republic of Ireland) P Reynolds	12	14
4	(Chinese Taipei) Lu C-y (Chinese Taipei) Yang P-ha	21	21

Second Round
(Denmark) M P Kolding (Denmark) N Nøhr	15	21	16
7	(Germany) M Lamsfuß (Germany) M Seidel	21	12	21
(Indonesia) S K Gutama (Indonesia) F W Putra	12	18
4	(Chinese Taipei) Lu C-y (Chinese Taipei) Yang P-ha	21	21

Quarter-finals
7	(Germany) M Lamsfuß (Germany) M Seidel	21	18	17
4	(Chinese Taipei) Lu C-y (Chinese Taipei) Yang P-ha	17	21	21

==== Section 4 ====
First Round
(Russia) R Alimov (Russia) R Kargaev	21	21
(Germany) H Graalmann (Germany) J R Jansen	17	17
(India) Arjun M. R. (India) R Shlok	14	15
8	(South Korea) Kim W-h (South Korea) Seo S-j	21	21
(Thailand) I Apisuk (Thailand) T Viriyangkura	15	15
(Denmark) D Daugaard (Denmark) F Søgaard	21	21
PFQ	(Russia) D Grachev (Russia) P Kotsarenko	10	16
2	(England) M Ellis (England) C Langridge	21	21

Second Round
(Russia) R Alimov (Russia) R Kargaev	9	13
8	(South Korea) Kim W-h (South Korea) Seo S-j	21	21
(Denmark) D Daugaard (Denmark) F Søgaard	18	10
2	(England) M Ellis (England) C Langridge	21	21

Quarter-finals
8	(South Korea) Kim W-h (South Korea) Seo S-j	21	21
2	(England) M Ellis (England) C Langridge	18	12

== Women's doubles ==
=== Seeds ===
1. (Bulgaria) Gabriela Stoeva / Stefani Stoeva (semi-finals)
2. (Japan) Nami Matsuyama / Chiharu Shida (final)
3. (Denmark) Maiken Fruergaard / Sara Thygesen (withdrew)
4. (Malaysia) Chow Mei Kuan / Lee Meng Yean (quarter-finals)
5. (Indonesia) Ni Ketut Mahadewi Istarani / Rizki Amelia Pradipta (withdrew)
6. (South Korea) Kim So-yeong / Kong Hee-yong (champions)
7. (France) Émilie Lefel / Anne Tran (quarter-finals)
8. (Russia) Ekaterina Bolotova / Alina Davletova (second round)

=== Finals ===
Semi-finals
1	(Bulgaria) Gabriela Stoeva (Bulgaria) Stefani Stoeva	19	21	17
6	(South Korea) Kim So-yeong (South Korea) Kong Hee-yong	21	18	21
(South Korea) Baek Ha-na (South Korea) Kim Hye-rin	13	22
2	(Japan) Nami Matsuyama (Japan) Chiharu Shida	21	24

Final
6	(South Korea) Kim So-yeong (South Korea) Kong Hee-yong	23	15	21
2	(Japan) Nami Matsuyama (Japan) Chiharu Shida	21	21	17

=== Top half ===
==== Section 1 ====
First Round
1	(Bulgaria) G Stoeva (Bulgaria) S Stoeva	21	21
(Indonesia) D D Haris (Indonesia) T O Kusumah	13	12
(Germany) L Efler (Germany) I Herttrich	15	21	23
(Chinese Taipei) Chang C-h (Chinese Taipei) Yang C-t	21	17	25
8	(Russia) E Bolotova (Russia) A Davletova	21	21
(England) C Birch (England) L Smith	10	16
(China) Dong WJ (China) Feng XY	21	21
Q3	(Spain) B Lucas (Spain) L Lucas	9	6

Second Round
1	(Bulgaria) G Stoeva (Bulgaria) S Stoeva	18	21	21
(Chinese Taipei) Chang C-h (Chinese Taipei) Yang C-t	21	12	10
8	(Russia) E Bolotova (Russia) A Davletova	15	12
(China) Dong WJ (China) Feng XY	21	21

Quarter-finals
1	(Bulgaria) G Stoeva (Bulgaria) S Stoeva	14	21	21
(China) Dong WJ (China) Feng XY	21	13	13

==== Section 2 ====
First Round
4	(Malaysia) Chow M K (Malaysia) Lee M Y	21	21
(Ukraine) M Ilyinskaya (Ukraine) Y Zharka	13	15
Q2
Q4	(Spain) P López (Spain) L Santos	w	/	o
6	(South Korea) Kim S-y (South Korea) Kong H-y	21	21
(France) D Delrue (France) L Palermo	14	15
(Chinese Taipei) Cheng C-y (Chinese Taipei) Lee C-c	21	21
(Canada) R Honderich (Canada) K Tsai	14	18

Second Round
4	(Malaysia) Chow M K (Malaysia) Lee M Y	21	21
Q4	(Spain) P López (Spain) L Santos	6	9
6	(South Korea) Kim S-y (South Korea) Kong H-y	21	21
(Chinese Taipei) Cheng C-y (Chinese Taipei) Lee C-c	10	12

Quarter-finals
4	(Malaysia) Chow M K (Malaysia) Lee M Y	6	21	12
6	(South Korea) Kim S-y (South Korea) Kong H-y	21	19	21

=== Bottom half ===
==== Section 3 ====
First Round
(Germany) A Jäger (Germany) J Petrikowski	8	12
(South Korea) Baek H-n (South Korea) Kim H-r	21	21
(Denmark) A Bøje (Denmark) R Søby Hansen	22	21
PFQ	(Chinese Taipei) Chen S-y (Chinese Taipei) Sung S-y	20	10
(India) P Dandu (India) S Santosh	15	21	16
(China) Cao TW (China) Yu XH	21	15	21
(Chinese Taipei) Hsu Y-c (Chinese Taipei) Hu L-f	21	16	21
PFQ	(Germany) E Janssens (Germany) K Ostermeyer	18	21	17

Second Round
(South Korea) Baek H-n (South Korea) Kim H-r	21	21
(Denmark) A Bøje (Denmark) R Søby Hansen	11	6
(China) Cao TW (China) Yu XH	23	12
(Chinese Taipei) Hsu Y-c (Chinese Taipei) Hu L-f	25	21

Quarter-finals
(South Korea) Baek H-n (South Korea) Kim H-r	21	18	21
(Chinese Taipei) Hsu Y-c (Chinese Taipei) Hu L-f	15	21	15

==== Section 4 ====
First Round
Q1	(Chinese Taipei) Pai Y-p (Chinese Taipei) Wu T-j	21	21
PFQ	(Latvia) L Lenceviča (Latvia) J Romanova	9	6
(Switzerland) N Fankhauser (Netherlands) I Tabeling	17	13
7	(France) É Lefel (France) A Tran	21	21
(Italy) S Garino (Italy) L Iversen	6	8
(Malaysia) V Hoo (Malaysia) Yap C W	21	21
(Germany) J Goliszewski (Germany) L Käpplein	21	16	10
2	(Japan) N Matsuyama (Japan) C Shida	17	21	21

Second Round
Q1	(Chinese Taipei) Pai Y-p (Chinese Taipei) Wu T-j	10	16
7	(France) É Lefel (France) A Tran	21	21
(Malaysia) V Hoo (Malaysia) Yap C W	11	21	14
2	(Japan) N Matsuyama (Japan) C Shida	21	18	21

Quarter-finals
7	(France) É Lefel (France) A Tran	16	18
2	(Japan) N Matsuyama (Japan) C Shida	21	21

== Mixed doubles ==
=== Seeds ===
1. (Denmark) Mathias Christiansen / Christinna Pedersen (first round)
2. (England) Marcus Ellis / Lauren Smith (semi-finals)
3. (South Korea) Seo Seung-jae / Chae Yoo-jung (champions)
4. (Germany) Mark Lamsfuß / Isabel Herttrich (first round)
5. (Indonesia) Tontowi Ahmad / Winny Oktavina Kandow (quarter-finals)
6. (Thailand) Nipitphon Phuangphuapet / Savitree Amitrapai (second round)
7. (Denmark) Niclas Nøhr / Sara Thygesen (withdrew)
8. (Germany) Marvin Seidel / Linda Efler (first round)

=== Finals ===
Semi-finals
(Chinese Taipei) Wang Chi-lin (Chinese Taipei) Cheng Chi-ya	21	21
(South Korea) Choi Sol-gyu (South Korea) Kim So-yeong	18	14
3	(South Korea) Seo Seung-jae (South Korea) Chae Yoo-jung	14	21	21
2	(England) Marcus Ellis (England) Lauren Smith	21	13	19

Final
(Chinese Taipei) Wang Chi-lin (Chinese Taipei) Cheng Chi-ya	18	15
3	(South Korea) Seo Seung-jae (South Korea) Chae Yoo-jung	21	21

=== Top half ===
==== Section 1 ====
First Round
1	(Denmark) M Christiansen (Denmark) C Pedersen	14	14
(France) T Gicquel (France) D Delrue	21	21
(Russia) R Alimov (Russia) A Davletova	17	21	21
(Chinese Taipei) Chang K-c (Chinese Taipei) Lee C-c	21	11	18
8	(Germany) M Seidel (Germany) L Efler	18	12
(Chinese Taipei) Wang C-l (Chinese Taipei) Cheng C-y	21	21
Q1	(Chinese Taipei) Yang M-t (Chinese Taipei) Wu T-j	22	21
(Russia) R Kargaev (Russia) V Vorobeva	20	14

Second Round
(France) T Gicquel (France) D Delrue	11	11
(Russia) R Alimov (Russia) A Davletova	21	21
(Chinese Taipei) Wang C-l (Chinese Taipei) Cheng C-y	21	21
Q1	(Chinese Taipei) Yang M-t (Chinese Taipei) Wu T-j	9	14

Quarter-finals
(Russia) R Alimov (Russia) A Davletova	15	12
(Chinese Taipei) Wang C-l (Chinese Taipei) Cheng C-y	21	21

==== Section 2 ====
First Round
4	(Germany) M Lamsfuß (Germany) I Herttrich	16	21	19
(South Korea) Choi S-g (South Korea) Kim S-y	21	13	21
(China) Wang ZK (China) Cao TW	21	21
(Russia) E Dremin (Russia) E Dimova	17	17
5	(Indonesia) T Ahmad (Indonesia) W O Kandow	21	21
PFQ	(Germany) J R Jansen (Germany) K Ostermeyer	19	18
Q3	(Hong Kong) Mak H C (Hong Kong) Chau H W	21	22
(Chinese Taipei) Lu C-y (Chinese Taipei) Lee C-h	13	20

Second Round
(South Korea) Choi S-g (South Korea) Kim S-y	12	21	21
(China) Wang ZK (China) Cao TW	21	18	19
5	(Indonesia) T Ahmad (Indonesia) W O Kandow	13	21	21
Q3	(Hong Kong) Mak H C (Hong Kong) Chau H W	21	14	17

Quarter-finals
(South Korea) Choi S-g (South Korea) Kim S-y	21	22
5	(Indonesia) T Ahmad (Indonesia) W O Kandow	17	20

=== Bottom half ===
==== Section 3 ====
First Round
PFQ	(Israel) M Zilberman (Israel) S Zilberman	9	12
(Indonesia) R Rivaldy (Indonesia) P H Mentari	21	21
(Canada) N Yakura (Canada) K Tsai	21	21
PFQ	(Ukraine) V Atrashchenkov (Ukraine) Y Zharka	15	19
(England) B Lane (England) J Pugh	19	21	21
PFQ	(Russia) D Grachev (Russia) E Bolotova	21	15	13
(Indonesia) A E Prasetya (Indonesia) M G Islami	16	21
3	(South Korea) Seo S-j (South Korea) Chae Y-j	21	23

Second Round
(Indonesia) R Rivaldy (Indonesia) P H Mentari	w	/	o
(Canada) N Yakura (Canada) K Tsai
(England) B Lane (England) J Pugh	19	17
3	(South Korea) Seo S-j (South Korea) Chae Y-j	21	21

Quarter-finals
(Indonesia) R Rivaldy (Indonesia) P H Mentari	15	21	15
3	(South Korea) Seo S-j (South Korea) Chae Y-j	21	16	21

==== Section 4 ====
First Round
(Chinese Taipei) Po L-w (Chinese Taipei) Chang C-h	18	11
Q2	(Chinese Taipei) Yang P-h (Chinese Taipei) Hu L-f	21	21
Q4	(Germany) J C Völker (Germany) E Janssens	16	13
6	(Thailand) N Phuangphuapet (Thailand) S Amitrapai	21	21
(Republic of Ireland) S Magee (Republic of Ireland) C Magee	21	21
(Denmark) M Bay-Smidt (Denmark) R Søby Hansen	15	18
(Chinese Taipei) Lee Y (Chinese Taipei) Yang C-t	15	14
2	(England) M Ellis (England) L Smith	21	21

Second Round
Q2	(Chinese Taipei) Yang P-h (Chinese Taipei) Hu L-f	21	21
6	(Thailand) N Phuangphuapet (Thailand) S Amitrapai	12	18
(Republic of Ireland) S Magee (Republic of Ireland) C Magee	18	12
2	(England) M Ellis (England) L Smith	21	21

Quarter-finals
Q2	(Chinese Taipei) Yang P-hs (Chinese Taipei) Hu L-f	18	12
2	(England) M Ellis (England) L Smith	21	21

Preceded by 2018 Spain Masters	Spain Masters	Succeeded by 2020 Spain Masters
Preceded by 2019 Indonesia Masters	BWF World Tour; 2019 BWF season	Succeeded by 2019 German Open
