= 2019 Singapore Open (badminton) =

2019 badminton tournament

Tournament details
- Dates: 9–14 April
- Edition: 70th
- Level: Super 500
- Total prize money: US$355,000
- Venue: Singapore Indoor Stadium
- Location: Kallang, Singapore

Champions
- Men's singles: (Japan) Kento Momota
- Women's singles: (Chinese Taipei) Tai Tzu-ying
- Men's doubles: (Japan) Takeshi Kamura (Japan) Keigo Sonoda
- Women's doubles: (Japan) Mayu Matsumoto (Japan) Wakana Nagahara
- Mixed doubles: (Thailand) Dechapol Puavaranukroh (Thailand) Sapsiree Taerattanachai

The 2019 Singapore Open (officially known as the Singapore Badminton Open 2019) was a badminton tournament which took place at Singapore Indoor Stadium in Singapore from 9 to 14 April 2019 and had a total purse of $355,000.

== Tournament ==
The 2019 Singapore Open was the tenth tournament of the 2019 BWF World Tour and also part of the Singapore Open championships, which had been held since 1929. This tournament was organized by the Singapore Badminton Association with sanction from the BWF.

=== Venue ===
This international tournament was held at Singapore Indoor Stadium in Singapore.

=== Point distribution ===
Below is the point distribution table for each phase of the tournament based on the BWF points system for the BWF World Tour Super 500 event.

Winner	Runner-up	3/4	5/8	9/16	17/32	33/64	65/128
9,200	7,800	6,420	5,040	3,600	2,220	880	430

=== Prize money ===
The total prize money for this tournament was US$355,000. Distribution of prize money was in accordance with BWF regulations.

Event	Winner	Finals	Semi-finals	Quarter-finals	Last 16
Singles	$26,625	$13,490	$5,147.50	$2,130	$1,242.50
Doubles	$28,045	$13,490	$4,970	$2,573.75	$1,331.25

== Men's singles ==
=== Seeds ===
1. (Japan) Kento Momota (champion)
2. (Chinese Taipei) Chou Tien-chen (semi-finals)
3. (Denmark) Viktor Axelsen (semi-finals)
4. (China) Chen Long (quarter-finals)
5. (South Korea) Son Wan-ho (withdrew)
6. (India) Srikanth Kidambi (quarter-finals)
7. (Indonesia) Anthony Sinisuka Ginting (final)
8. (Indonesia) Tommy Sugiarto (first round)

=== Finals ===
Semi-finals
1	(Japan) Kento Momota	21	21
3	(Denmark) Viktor Axelsen	15	18
7	(Indonesia) Anthony Sinisuka Ginting	21	18	21
2	(Chinese Taipei) Chou Tien-chen	17	21	14

Final
1	(Japan) Kento Momota	10	21	21
7	(Indonesia) Anthony Sinisuka Ginting	21	19	13

=== Top half ===
==== Section 1 ====
First Round
1	(Japan) K Momota	19	21	22
(India) B. Sai Praneeth	21	14	20
(France) B Leverdez	21	16	18
(India) Prannoy K	11	21	21
6	(India) S Kidambi	21	21
Q3	(Thailand) S Thammasin	17	18
(Denmark) H-K Vittinghus	19	21	21
(Japan) K Tsuneyama	21	18	13

Second Round
1	(Japan) K Momota	21	21
(India) Prannoy K	11	11
6	(India) S Kidambi	21	23
(Denmark) H-K Vittinghus	12	21

Quarter-finals
1	(Japan) K Momota	21	19	21
6	(India) S Kidambi	18	21	9

==== Section 2 ====
First Round
3	(Denmark) V Axelsen	20
(China) Lin D	13^{r}
(China) Huang YX	16	19
(Thailand) K Wangcharoen	21	21
PFQ	(South Korea) Lee H-i	19	16
(Malaysia) Lee Z J	21	21
(Indonesia) J Christie	21	19	21
(Thailand) K Phetpradab	18	21	18

Second Round
3	(Denmark) V Axelsen	21	15	21
(Thailand) K Wangcharoen	14	21	12
(Malaysia) Lee Z J	13	12
(Indonesia) J Christie	21	21

Quarter-finals
3	(Denmark) V Axelsen	22	21	24
(Indonesia) J Christie	24	18	22

=== Bottom half ===
==== Section 3 ====
First Round
(Malaysia) Liew D	21	18	20
(Japan) K Nishimoto	19	21	22
(Chinese Taipei) Wang T-w	12	12
7	(Indonesia) A S Ginting	21	21
(Denmark) R Gemke	19	14
Q1	(India) Parupalli K	21	21
(Denmark) A Antonsen	14	18
4	(China) Chen L	21	21

Second Round
(Japan) K Nishimoto	10	16
7	(Indonesia) A S Ginting	21	21
Q1	(India) Parupalli K	9	21	16
4	(China) Chen L	21	15	21

Quarter-finals
7	(Indonesia) A S Ginting	21	21
4	(China) Chen L	8	19

==== Section 4 ====
First Round
(India) S Verma	21	21
Q4	(Thailand) S Avihingsanon	14	6
(China) Lu GZ	21	21
8	(Indonesia) T Sugiarto	17	18
(Denmark) J Ø. Jørgensen	21	21
(South Korea) Lee D-k	11	8
Q2	(Thailand) T Saensomboonsuk	18	16
2	(Chinese Taipei) Chou T-c	21	21

Second Round
(India) S Verma	21	21
(China) Lu GZ	15	18
(Denmark) J Ø. Jørgensen	18	10
2	(Chinese Taipei) Chou T-c	21	21

Quarter-finals
(India) S Verma	10	21	15
2	(Chinese Taipei) Chou T-c	21	15	21

== Women's singles ==
=== Seeds ===
1. (Chinese Taipei) Tai Tzu-ying (champion)
2. (Japan) Nozomi Okuhara (final)
3. (Japan) Akane Yamaguchi (semi-finals)
4. (India) P. V. Sindhu (semi-finals)
5. (Thailand) Ratchanok Intanon (quarter-finals)
6. (India) Saina Nehwal (quarter-finals)
7. (South Korea) Sung Ji-hyun (quarter-finals)
8. (Japan) Sayaka Takahashi (first round)

=== Finals ===
Semi-finals
1	(Chinese Taipei) Tai Tzu-ying	15	24	21
3	(Japan) Akane Yamaguchi	21	22	19
4	(India) P. V. Sindhu	7	11
2	(Japan) Nozomi Okuhara	21	21

Final
1	(Chinese Taipei) Tai Tzu-ying	21	21
2	(Japan) Nozomi Okuhara	19	15

=== Top half ===
==== Section 1 ====
First Round
1	(Chinese Taipei) Tai T-y	21	10	21
(United States) BW Zhang	14	21	18
(China) Chen XX	21	21
Q2	(Singapore) J Hooi	13	8
7	(South Korea) Sung J-h	21	21
(Hong Kong) Deng X	15	13
(Singapore) Yeo J M	18	21	15
(Indonesia) R Hartawan	21	17	21

Second Round
1	(Chinese Taipei) Tai T-y	21	21
(China) Chen XX	15	18
7	(South Korea) Sung J-h	21	21
(Indonesia) R Hartawan	17	7

Quarter-finals
1	(Chinese Taipei) Tai T-y	21	17	21
7	(South Korea) Sung J-h	11	21	16

==== Section 2 ====
First Round
3	(Japan) A Yamaguchi	19	21	21
(Japan) A Ohori	21	14	13
Q4	(Singapore) G Chua	21	21
Q1	(United States) D Gupta	19	10
5	(Thailand) R Intanon	21	21
(Indonesia) Fitriani	18	14
(Thailand) N Jindapol	14	22	16
(China) Han Y	21	20	21

Second Round
3	(Japan) A Yamaguchi	21	21
Q4	(Singapore) G Chua	6	11
5	(Thailand) R Intanon	19	21	21
(China) Han Y	21	11	13

Quarter-finals
3	(Japan) A Yamaguchi	21	21
5	(Thailand) R Intanon	13	17

=== Bottom half ===
==== Section 3 ====
First Round
(China) Cai YY	21	21
PFQ	(Chinese Taipei) Chiang Y-l	11	11
(China) Li XR	21	21
8	(Japan) S Takahashi	13	16
(Denmark) M Blichfeldt	21	22
(Indonesia) G M Tunjung	16	20
(Indonesia) L A Mainaky	9	7
4	(India) P. V. Sindhu	21	21

Second Round
(China) Cai YY	21	21
(China) Li XR	16	18
(Denmark) M Blichfeldt	13	19
4	(India) P. V. Sindhu	21	21

Quarter-finals
(China) Cai YY	13	21	14
4	(India) P. V. Sindhu	21	17	21

==== Section 4 ====
First Round
Q3	(India) M Agrey	6	8
(Thailand) P Chochuwong	21	21
PFQ	(Indonesia) Y Y Susanto	16	12
6	(India) S Nehwal	21	21
(Thailand) B Ongbamrungphan	21	21
(Scotland) K Gilmour	11	17
(Russia) E Kosetskaya	13	9
2	(Japan) N Okuhara	21	21

Second Round
(Thailand) P Chochuwong	16	21	19
6	(India) S Nehwal	21	18	21
(Thailand) B Ongbamrungphan	21	15	13
2	(Japan) N Okuhara	18	21	21

Quarter-finals
6	(India) S Nehwal	8	13
2	(Japan) N Okuhara	21	21

== Men's doubles ==
=== Seeds ===
1. (Indonesia) Marcus Fernaldi Gideon / Kevin Sanjaya Sukamuljo (semi-finals)
2. (China) Li Junhui / Liu Yuchen (semi-finals)
3. (Japan) Takeshi Kamura / Keigo Sonoda (champions)
4. (Indonesia) Mohammad Ahsan / Hendra Setiawan (final)
5. (Japan) Hiroyuki Endo / Yuta Watanabe (second round)
6. (Denmark) Kim Astrup / Anders Skaarup Rasmussen (quarter-finals)
7. (China) Han Chengkai / Zhou Haodong (first round)
8. (Indonesia) Fajar Alfian / Muhammad Rian Ardianto (quarter-finals)

=== Finals ===
Semi-finals
1	(Indonesia) Marcus Fernaldi Gideon (Indonesia) Kevin Sanjaya Sukamuljo	21	10	19
3	(Japan) Takeshi Kamura (Japan) Keigo Sonoda	13	21	21
4	(Indonesia) Mohammad Ahsan (Indonesia) Hendra Setiawan	21	21
2	(China) Li Junhui (China) Liu Yuchen	11	14

Final
3	(Japan) Takeshi Kamura (Japan) Keigo Sonoda	21	19	21
4	(Indonesia) Mohammad Ahsan (Indonesia) Hendra Setiawan	13	21	17

=== Top half ===
==== Section 1 ====
First Round
1	(Indonesia) M F Gideon (Indonesia) K S Sukamuljo	21	13	21
(Indonesia) B Angriawan (Indonesia) Hardianto	18	21	16
(Malaysia) Ong Y S (Malaysia) Teo E Y	19	21	18
(China) He JT (China) Tan Q	21	19	21
8	(Indonesia) F Alfian (Indonesia) M R Ardianto	21	25
Q1	(Indonesia) R K Suwardi (Indonesia) A Pratama	16	23
Q3	(Malaysia) Chooi K M (Malaysia) Low J S	8	21	21
Q2	(Malaysia) Goh Z F (Malaysia) N Izzuddin	21	16	18

Second Round
1	(Indonesia) M F Gideon (Indonesia) K S Sukamuljo	21	21
(China) He JT (China) Tan Q	14	17
8	(Indonesia) F Alfian (Indonesia) M R Ardianto	22	21
Q3	(Malaysia) Chooi K M (Malaysia) Low J S	20	17

Quarter-finals
1	(Indonesia) M F Gideon (Indonesia) K S Sukamuljo	21	21
8	(Indonesia) F Alfian (Indonesia) M R Ardianto	18	10

==== Section 2 ====
First Round
3	(Japan) T Kamura (Japan) K Sonoda	21	21
(Chinese Taipei) Liao M-c (Chinese Taipei) Su C-h	15	15
(South Korea) Ko S-h (South Korea) Shin B-c	17	15
(Japan) T Inoue (Japan) Y Kaneko	21	21
5	(Japan) H Endo (Japan) Y Watanabe	w	/	o
(Thailand) B Isara (Thailand) M Jongjit
(Chinese Taipei) Lu C-y (Chinese Taipei) Yang P-h	18	16
(Japan) T Hoki (Japan) Y Kobayashi	21	21

Second Round
3	(Japan) T Kamura (Japan) K Sonoda	21	21
(Japan) T Inoue (Japan) Y Kaneko	18	12
5	(Japan) H Endo (Japan) Y Watanabe	16	17
(Japan) T Hoki (Japan) Y Kobayashi	21	21

Quarter-finals
3	(Japan) T Kamura (Japan) K Sonoda	22	21
(Japan) T Hoki (Japan) Y Kobayashi	20	11

=== Bottom half ===
==== Section 3 ====
First Round
(Thailand) T Isriyanet (Thailand) K Namdash	20	21	21
PFQ	(Thailand) K Kedren (Thailand) D Puavaranukroh	22	19	19
(Malaysia) Goh V S (Malaysia) Tan W K	22	21
7	(China) Han CK (China) Zhou HD	20	15
(South Korea) Kim G-j (South Korea) Lee Y-d	21	21
(Malaysia) M Arif A L (Malaysia) N M Azriyn A	16	13
(Indonesia) W Nayaka (Indonesia) A Yusuf	19	15
4	(Indonesia) M Ahsan (Indonesia) H Setiawan	21	21

Second Round
(Thailand) T Isriyanet (Thailand) K Namdash	15	10
(Malaysia) Goh V S (Malaysia) Tan W K	21	21
(South Korea) Kim G-j (South Korea) Lee Y-d	14	17
4	(Indonesia) M Ahsan (Indonesia) H Setiawan	21	21

Quarter-finals
(Malaysia) Goh V S (Malaysia) Tan W K	21	16	17
4	(Indonesia) M Ahsan (Indonesia) H Setiawan	18	21	21

==== Section 4 ====
First Round
(India) M Attri (India) B. S Reddy	13	17
Q4	(Singapore) D B Chrisnanta (Singapore) Loh K H	21	21
PFQ	(India) Arjun M.R. (India) R Shlok	11	18
6	(Denmark) K Astrup (Denmark) A S Rasmussen	21	21
(Malaysia) A Chia (Malaysia) Soh W Y	21	21
(China) Liu C (China) Zhang N	13	18
(China) Ou XY (China) Ren XY	18	18
2	(China) Li JH (China) Liu YC	21	21

Second Round
Q4	(Singapore) D B Chrisnanta (Singapore) Loh K H	13	20
6	(Denmark) K Astrup (Denmark) A S Rasmussen	21	22
(Malaysia) A Chia (Malaysia) Soh W Y	11	19
2	(China) Li JH (China) Liu YC	21	21

Quarter-finals
6	(Denmark) K Astrup (Denmark) A S Rasmussen	15	21	19
2	(China) Li JH (China) Liu YC	21	19	21

== Women's doubles ==
=== Seeds ===
1. (Japan) Yuki Fukushima / Sayaka Hirota (semi-finals)
2. (Japan) Misaki Matsutomo / Ayaka Takahashi (second round)
3. (Japan) Mayu Matsumoto / Wakana Nagahara (champions)
4. (Japan) Shiho Tanaka / Koharu Yonemoto (withdrew)
5. (Thailand) Jongkolphan Kititharakul / Rawinda Prajongjai (quarter-finals)
6. (Japan) Ayako Sakuramoto / Yukiko Takahata (quarter-finals)
7. (Japan) Nami Matsuyama / Chiharu Shida (quarter-finals)
8. (South Korea) Chang Ye-na / Jung Kyung-eun (first round)

=== Finals ===
Semi-finals
1	(Japan) Yuki Fukushima (Japan) Sayaka Hirota	18	17
3	(Japan) Mayu Matsumoto (Japan) Wakana Nagahara	21	21
(China) Liu Xuanxuan (China) Xia Yuting	15	15
(South Korea) Kim Hye-jeong (South Korea) Kong Hee-yong	21	21

Final
3	(Japan) Mayu Matsumoto (Japan) Wakana Nagahara	21	22
(South Korea) Kim Hye-jeong (South Korea) Kong Hee-yong	17	20

=== Top half ===
==== Section 1 ====
First Round
1	(Japan) Y Fukushima (Japan) S Hirota	21	21
(Indonesia) A S Awanda (Indonesia) P Z Bernadeth	7	17
(Thailand) P Chochuwong (Thailand) K Dubthuk	21	21
PFQ	(Singapore) Jin YJ (Singapore) Lim M H	16	19
6	(Japan) A Sakuramoto (Japan) Y Takahata	21	21
(China) Chen L (China) Xu Y	18	15
(Australia) S Mapasa (Australia) G Somerville	23	21
(Chinese Taipei) Chang C-h (Chinese Taipei) Yang C-t	21	12

Second Round
1	(Japan) Y Fukushima (Japan) S Hirota	21	21
(Thailand) P Chochuwong (Thailand) K Dubthuk	13	7
6	(Japan) A Sakuramoto (Japan) Y Takahata	21	21
(Australia) S Mapasa (Australia) G Somerville	13	17

Quarter-finals
1	(Japan) Y Fukushima (Japan) S Hirota	21	23
6	(Japan) A Sakuramoto (Japan) Y Takahata	17	21

==== Section 2 ====
First Round
3	(Japan) M Matsumoto (Japan) W Nagahara	21	21
PFQ	(Thailand) N Chatupornkarnchana (Thailand) S Chumnibannakarn	6	5
(Indonesia) Y Barkah (Indonesia) J F Sugiarto	21	21
(Hong Kong) Ng T Y (Hong Kong) Yuen S Y	17	12
8	(South Korea) Chang Y-n (South Korea) Jung K-e	21	20	16
(South Korea) Baek H-n (South Korea) Kim H-r	14	22	21
Q2	(Singapore) Citra P S D (Singapore) Liang Y	12	12
(China) Li WM (China) Zheng Y	21	21

Second Round
3	(Japan) M Matsumoto (Japan) W Nagahara	23	21
(Indonesia) Y Barkah (Indonesia) J F Sugiarto	21	17
(South Korea) Baek H-n (South Korea) Kim H-r	21	18	17
(China) Li WM (China) Zheng Y	18	21	21

Quarter-finals
3	(Japan) M Matsumoto (Japan) W Nagahara	21	21
(China) Li WM (China) Zheng Y	17	19

=== Bottom half ===
==== Section 3 ====
First Round
(Thailand) P Supajirakul (Thailand) S Taerattanachai	21	18	19
(China) Dong WJ (China) Feng XY	18	21	21
(Indonesia) N K M Istarani (Indonesia) R A Pradipta	10	6
5	(Thailand) J Kititharakul (Thailand) R Prajongjai	21	21
(China) Liu XX (China) Xia YT	w	/	o
Q4
PFQ	(Singapore) J Hooi (Singapore) C Wong	21	21
PFQ	(Singapore) K Koh (Singapore) B Lim	13	19

Second Round
(China) Dong WJ (China) Feng XY	14	23	10
5	(Thailand) J Kititharakul (Thailand) R Prajongjai	21	21	21
(China) Liu XX (China) Xia YT	21	21
PFQ	(Singapore) J Hooi (Singapore) C Wong	6	10

Quarter-finals
5	(Thailand) J Kititharakul (Thailand) R Prajongjai	16	14
(China) Liu XX (China) Xia YT	21	21

==== Section 4 ====
First Round
(India) P Dandu (India) S Santosh	w	/	o
Q1
(Thailand) C Chaladchalam (Thailand) P Muenwong	21	16
7	(Japan) N Matsuyama (Japan) C Shida	23	21
(South Korea) Kim H-j (South Korea) Kong H-y	21	21
(Chinese Taipei) Hsu Y-c (Chinese Taipei) Hu L-f	17	15
Q3	(Indonesia) D D Haris (Indonesia) T O Kusumah	15	19
2	(Japan) M Matsutomo (Japan) A Takahashi	21	21

Second Round
(India) P Dandu (India) S Santosh	15	12
7	(Japan) N Matsuyama (Japan) C Shida	21	21
(South Korea) Kim H-j (South Korea) Kong H-y	21	21
2	(Japan) M Matsutomo (Japan) A Takahashi	18	10

Quarter-finals
7	(Japan) N Matsuyama (Japan) C Shida	13	13
(South Korea) Kim H-j (South Korea) Kong H-y	21	21

== Mixed doubles ==
=== Seeds ===
1. (China) Zheng Siwei / Huang Yaqiong (semi-finals)
2. (Japan) Yuta Watanabe / Arisa Higashino (first round)
3. (Thailand) Dechapol Puavaranukroh / Sapsiree Taerattanachai (champions)
4. (Malaysia) Chan Peng Soon / Goh Liu Ying (quarter-finals)
5. (Hong Kong) Tang Chun Man / Tse Ying Suet (second round)
6. (Malaysia) Goh Soon Huat / Shevon Jemie Lai (second round)
7. (Indonesia) Hafiz Faizal / Gloria Emanuelle Widjaja (semi-finals)
8. (China) He Jiting / Du Yue (first round)

=== Finals ===
Semi-finals
1	(China) Zheng Siwei (China) Huang Yaqiong	22	19
3	(Thailand) Dechapol Puavaranukroh (Thailand) Sapsiree Taerattanachai	24	21
7	(Indonesia) Hafiz Faizal (Indonesia) Gloria Emanuelle Widjaja	16	22	20
(Malaysia) Tan Kian Meng (Malaysia) Lai Pei Jing	21	20	22

Final
3	(Thailand) Dechapol Puavaranukroh (Thailand) Sapsiree Taerattanachai	21	21
(Malaysia) Tan Kian Meng (Malaysia) Lai Pei Jing	14	6

=== Top half ===
==== Section 1 ====
First Round
1	(China) Zheng SW (China) Huang YQ	21	21
(Japan) T Hoki (Japan) W Nagahara	18	9
Q4	(Malaysia) M Arif A L (Indonesia) R A Riodingin	12	16
(Indonesia) P Jordan (Indonesia) M D Oktavianti	21	21
6	(Malaysia) Goh S H (Malaysia) S J Lai	21	21
(Indonesia) A E Prasetya (Indonesia) M G Islami	18	16
(Singapore) D B Chrisnanta (Singapore) J Tan	17	21
(Japan) Y Kaneko (Japan) M Matsutomo	21	23

Second Round
1	(China) Zheng SW (China) Huang YQ	21	21
(Indonesia) P Jordan (Indonesia) M D Oktavianti	16	13
6	(Malaysia) Goh S H (Malaysia) S J Lai	22	10
(Japan) Y Kaneko (Japan) M Matsutomo	24	21

Quarter-finals
1	(China) Zheng SW (China) Huang YQ	21	21
(Japan) Y Kaneko (Japan) M Matsutomo	12	7

==== Section 2 ====
First Round
3	(Thailand) D Puavaranukroh (Thailand) S Taerattanachai	21	21
(India) S Sharma (India) A Parikh	12	12
(China) Lu K (China) Chen L	15	16
(China) Ou XY (China) Feng XY	21	21
5	(Hong Kong) Tang C M (Hong Kong) Tse Y S	21	21
(Republic of Ireland) S Magee (Republic of Ireland) C Magee	15	11
(India) Arjun M. R. (India) K. Maneesha	18	7
(India) P Chopra (India) N. S Reddy	21	21

Second Round
3	(Thailand) D Puavaranukroh (Thailand) S Taerattanachai	21	21
(China) Ou XY (China) Feng XY	16	14
5	(Hong Kong) Tang C M (Hong Kong) Tse Y S	17	21	19
(India) P Chopra (India) N. S Reddy	21	6	21

Quarter-finals
3	(Thailand) D Puavaranukroh (Thailand) S Taerattanachai	21	21
(India) P Chopra (India) N. S Reddy	14	16

=== Bottom half ===
==== Section 3 ====
First Round
(Indonesia) R Rivaldy (Indonesia) P H Mentari	21	21
(Thailand) N Phuangphuapet (Thailand) S Amitrapai	17	17
(Malaysia) Chen T J (Malaysia) Peck Y W	18	14
7	(Indonesia) H Faizal (Indonesia) G E Widjaja	21	21
(India) V G Prasad (India) J Dewangan	12	15
Q2	(Chinese Taipei) Lu C-y (Chinese Taipei) Lee C-h	21	21
PFQ	(Singapore) T Hee (Singapore) C Wong	18	20
4	(Malaysia) Chan P S (Malaysia) Goh L Y	21	22

Second Round
(Indonesia) R Rivaldy (Indonesia) P H Mentari	7	11
7	(Indonesia) H Faizal (Indonesia) G E Widjaja	21	21
Q2	(Chinese Taipei) Lu C-y (Chinese Taipei) Lee C-h	15	15
4	(Malaysia) Chan P S (Malaysia) Goh L Y	21	21

Quarter-finals
7	(Indonesia) H Faizal (Indonesia) G E Widjaja	18	21	21
4	(Malaysia) Chan P S (Malaysia) Goh L Y	21	12	16

==== Section 4 ====
First Round
(Indonesia) R K Suwardi (Indonesia) P Z Bernadeth	21	21
Q1	(Singapore) B A Prakoso (Singapore) Jin YJ	13	16
(Indonesia) R Alexander (Indonesia) A Saufika	21	11	21
8	(China) He JT (China) Du Y	19	21	18
(Japan) K Gondo (Japan) A Kurihara	17	21	21
Q3	(Singapore) A Kwek (Singapore) Citra P S D	21	14	12
(Malaysia) Tan K M (Malaysia) Lai P J	16	21	21
2	(Japan) Y Watanabe (Japan) A Higashino	21	18	15

Second Round
(Indonesia) R K Suwardi (Indonesia) P Z Bernadeth	12	21	21
(Indonesia) R Alexander (Indonesia) A Saufika	21	13	16
(Japan) K Gondo (Japan) A Kurihara	21	9	17
(Malaysia) Tan K M (Malaysia) Lai P J	19	21	21

Quarter-finals
(Indonesia) R K Suwardi (Indonesia) P Z Bernadeth	20	21	18
(Malaysia) Tan K M (Malaysia) Lai P J	22	14	21

Preceded by 2018 Singapore Open	Singapore Open	Succeeded by 2020 Singapore Open
Preceded by 2019 Malaysia Open	BWF World Tour; 2019 BWF season	Succeeded by 2019 New Zealand Open
