= Keigo Sonoda =

Japanese badminton player (born 1990)

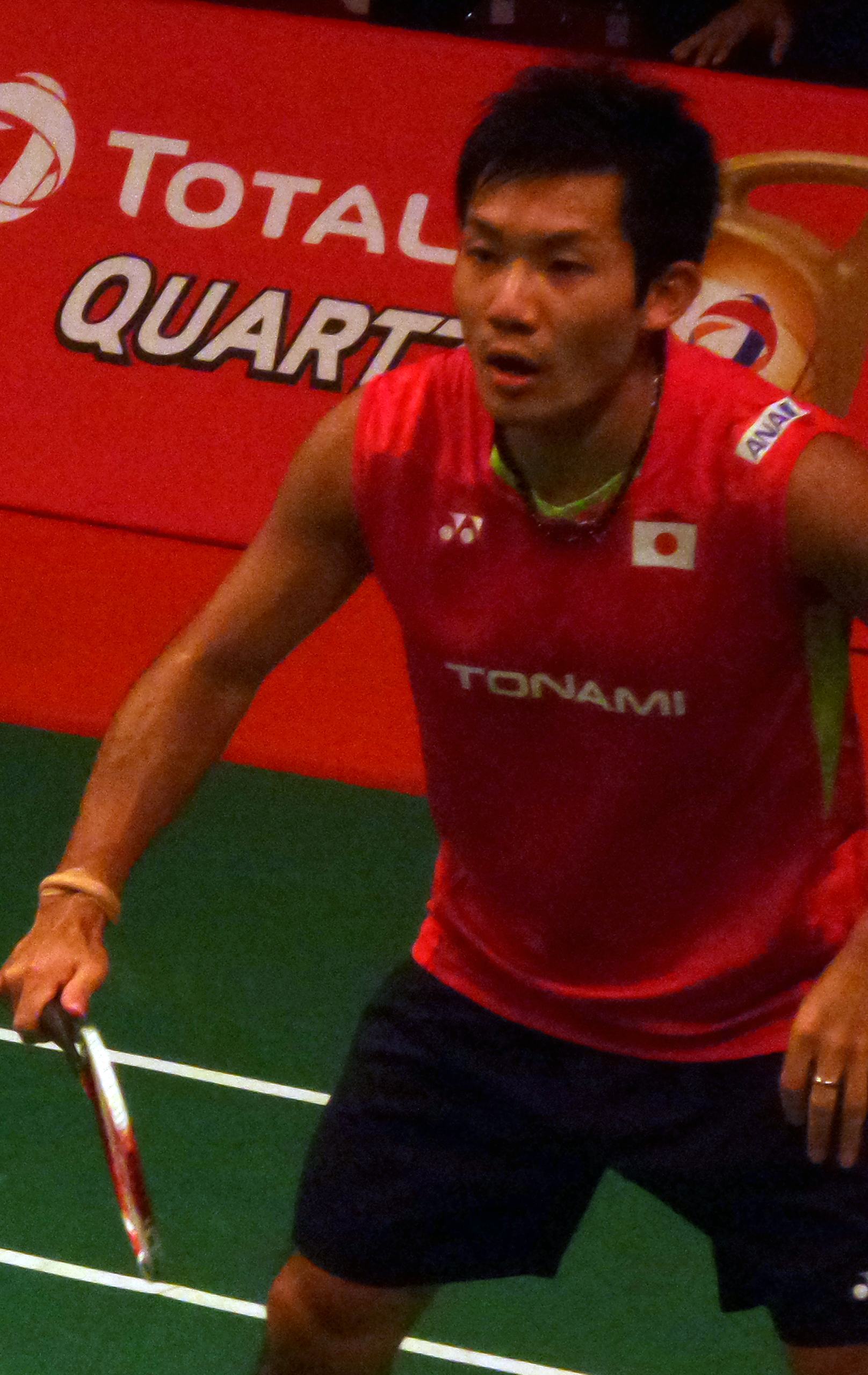

Personal information
- Born: 20 February 1990 (age 36) Yatsushiro, Kumamoto, Japan
- Height: 1.69 m (5 ft 7 in)
- Weight: 70 kg (154 lb)

Sport
- Country: Japan
- Sport: Badminton
- Handedness: Right

Men's singles & doubles
- Highest ranking: 69 (MS 1 December 2011); 2 (MD with Takeshi Kamura 26 January 2017); 19 (XD 31 March 2016)
- BWF profile
Medal record
Men's badminton
Representing Japan
World Championships
Silver medal – second place	2018 Nanjing	Men's doubles
Bronze medal – third place	2017 Glasgow	Men's doubles
Sudirman Cup
Silver medal – second place	2015 Dongguan	Mixed team
Silver medal – second place	2019 Nanning	Mixed team
Bronze medal – third place	2017 Gold Coast	Mixed team
Thomas Cup
Gold medal – first place	2014 New Delhi	Men's team
Silver medal – second place	2018 Bangkok	Men's team
Asian Games
Bronze medal – third place	2018 Jakarta-Palembang	Men's team
Asia Championships
Silver medal – second place	2018 Wuhan	Men's doubles
Bronze medal – third place	2016 Wuhan	Men's doubles
Bronze medal – third place	2017 Wuhan	Men's doubles
Bronze medal – third place	2019 Wuhan	Men's doubles
Asia Mixed Team Championships
Gold medal – first place	2017 Ho Chi Minh	Mixed team
Asia Team Championships
Silver medal – second place	2016 Hyderabad	Men's team
Asian Junior Championships
Bronze medal – third place	2007 Kuala Lumpur	Mixed team

Keigo Sonoda (園田 啓悟, Sonoda Keigo; born 20 February 1990) is a Japanese badminton player. He affiliated with the YKK AP Yatsushiro, before joining the Tonami team in 2010. Sonoda was part of the national team that won the 2014 Thomas Cup. He captured his first Superseries title at the 2016 Hong Kong Open, and reached a career high of world number 2 in the men's doubles partnered with Takeshi Kamura in January 2017.

Sonoda won the silver medal at the 2018 World Championships and a bronze in 2017. In the continental level, he helped the national team to win the 2017 Asia Mixed Team Championships, and he also collected a silver and three bronze medals in the individual men's doubles event. He competed at the 2014 and 2018 Asian Games. He retired in 2021 after competing at the 2020 Summer Olympics.

== Career ==
Sonoda competed at the 2020 Summer Olympics. Partnered with Takeshi Kamura, the duo was eliminated in the quarter-finals by the second seeds Mohammad Ahsan and Hendra Setiawan.

== Records ==
- First Japanese men's doubles pair to win the German Open (2014, partnered with Takeshi Kamura).

== Achievements ==
=== World Championships ===
Men's doubles
Year	Venue	Partner	Opponent	Score	Result	Ref.
2017	Emirates Arena; Glasgow, Scotland	(Japan) Takeshi Kamura	(Indonesia) Mohammad Ahsan (Indonesia) Rian Agung Saputro	12–21, 15–21	Bronze	
2018	Nanjing Youth Olympic Sports Park; Nanjing, China	(Japan) Takeshi Kamura	(China) Li Junhui (China) Liu Yuchen	12–21, 19–21	Silver	

=== Asian Championships ===
Men's doubles
Year	Venue	Partner	Opponent	Score	Result
2016	Wuhan Sports Center Gymnasium; Wuhan, China	(Japan) Takeshi Kamura	(South Korea) Lee Yong-dae (South Korea) Yoo Yeon-seong	17–21, 18–21	Bronze
2017	Wuhan Sports Center Gymnasium; Wuhan, China	(Japan) Takeshi Kamura	(China) Li Junhui (China) Liu Yuchen	15–21, 21–13, 18–21	Bronze
2018	Wuhan Sports Center Gymnasium; Wuhan, China	(Japan) Takeshi Kamura	(China) Li Junhui (China) Liu Yuchen	21–11, 10–21, 13–21	Silver
2019	Wuhan Sports Center Gymnasium; Wuhan, China	(Japan) Takeshi Kamura	(Indonesia) Marcus Fernaldi Gideon (Indonesia) Kevin Sanjaya Sukamuljo	21–15, 17–21, 15–21	Bronze

=== BWF World Tour (3 titles, 8 runners-up) ===
The BWF World Tour, which was announced on 19 March 2017 and implemented in 2018, is a series of elite badminton tournaments sanctioned by the Badminton World Federation (BWF). The BWF World Tour is divided into levels of World Tour Finals, Super 1000, Super 750, Super 500, Super 300 (part of the HSBC World Tour), and the BWF Tour Super 100.

Men's doubles
Year	Tournament	Level	Partner	Opponent	Score	Result	Ref.
2018	Malaysia Open	Super 750	(Japan) Takeshi Kamura	(Japan) Hiroyuki Endo (Japan) Yuta Watanabe	21–8, 21–10	(gold) Winner	
2018	Thailand Open	Super 500	(Japan) Takeshi Kamura	(Japan) Hiroyuki Endo (Japan) Yuta Watanabe	21–17, 21–19	(gold) Winner	
2018	Denmark Open	Super 750	(Japan) Takeshi Kamura	(Indonesia) Marcus Fernaldi Gideon (Indonesia) Kevin Sanjaya Sukamuljo	15–21, 16–21	(silver) Runner-up	
2018	Hong Kong Open	Super 500	(Japan) Takeshi Kamura	(Indonesia) Marcus Fernaldi Gideon (Indonesia) Kevin Sanjaya Sukamuljo	13–21, 12–21	(silver) Runner-up	
2019	German Open	Super 300	(Japan) Takeshi Kamura	(Japan) Hiroyuki Endo (Japan) Yuta Watanabe	21–15, 11–21, 12–21	(silver) Runner-up	
2019	Malaysia Open	Super 750	(Japan) Takeshi Kamura	(China) Li Junhui (China) Liu Yuchen	12–21, 17–21	(silver) Runner-up	
2019	Singapore Open	Super 500	(Japan) Takeshi Kamura	(Indonesia) Mohammad Ahsan (Indonesia) Hendra Setiawan	21–13, 19–21, 21–17	(gold) Winner	
2019	Australian Open	Super 300	(Japan) Takeshi Kamura	(South Korea) Ko Sung-hyun (South Korea) Shin Baek-Cheol	11–21, 17–21	(silver) Runner-up	
2019	Korea Open	Super 500	(Japan) Takeshi Kamura	(Indonesia) Fajar Alfian (Indonesia) Muhammad Rian Ardianto	16–21, 17–21	(silver) Runner-up	
2019	Fuzhou China Open	Super 750	(Japan) Takeshi Kamura	(Indonesia) Marcus Fernaldi Gideon (Indonesia) Kevin Sanjaya Sukamuljo	17–21, 9–21	(silver) Runner-up	
2021	All England Open	Super 1000	(Japan) Takeshi Kamura	(Japan) Hiroyuki Endo (Japan) Yuta Watanabe	15–21, 21–17, 11–21	(silver) Runner-up	

=== BWF Superseries (2 titles, 2 runners-up) ===
The BWF Superseries, which was launched on 14 December 2006 and implemented in 2007, was a series of elite badminton tournaments, sanctioned by the Badminton World Federation (BWF). BWF Superseries levels were Superseries and Superseries Premier. A season of Superseries consisted of twelve tournaments around the world that had been introduced since 2011. Successful players were invited to the Superseries Finals, which were held at the end of each year.

Men's doubles
Year	Tournament	Partner	Opponent	Score	Result
2016	Singapore Open	(Japan) Takeshi Kamura	(China) Fu Haifeng (China) Zhang Nan	11–21, 20–22	(silver) Runner-up
2016	Hong Kong Open	(Japan) Takeshi Kamura	(Denmark) Mathias Boe (Denmark) Carsten Mogensen	21–19, 21–19	(gold) Winner
2016	Dubai World Superseries Finals	(Japan) Takeshi Kamura	(Malaysia) Goh V Shem (Malaysia) Tan Wee Kiong	14–21, 19–21	(silver) Runner-up
2017	Australia Open	(Japan) Takeshi Kamura	(Indonesia) Hendra Setiawan (Malaysia) Tan Boon Heong	21–17, 21–19	(gold) Winner

BWF Super Series Finals tournament
BWF Super Series tournament

=== BWF Grand Prix (3 titles) ===
The BWF Grand Prix had two levels, the Grand Prix and Grand Prix Gold. It was a series of badminton tournaments sanctioned by the Badminton World Federation (BWF) and played between 2007 and 2017.

Men's doubles
Year	Tournament	Partner	Opponent	Score	Result	Ref.
2012	Canada Open	(Japan) Takeshi Kamura	(Japan) Hiroyuki Saeki (Japan) Ryota Taohata	12–21, 21–16, 21–19	(gold) Winner	
2013	U.S. Open	(Japan) Takeshi Kamura	(Chinese Taipei) Liang Jui-wei (Chinese Taipei) Liao Kuan-hao	21–16, 27–25	(gold) Winner	
2014	German Open	(Japan) Takeshi Kamura	(Japan) Hiroyuki Endo (Japan) Kenichi Hayakawa	21–19, 14–21, 21–14	(gold) Winner	

BWF Grand Prix Gold tournament
BWF Grand Prix tournament

=== BWF International Challenge/Series (5 titles, 1 runner-up) ===
Men's singles
Year	Tournament	Opponent	Score	Result	Ref.
2011	Osaka International	(Japan) Sho Zeniya	18–21, 21–16, 21–16	(gold) Winner	

Men's doubles
Year	Tournament	Partner	Opponent	Score	Result	Ref.
2011	Osaka International	(Japan) Takatoshi Kurose	(Japan) Shu Wada (Japan) Tatsuya Watanabe	21–14, 21–14	(gold) Winner	
2011	Malaysia International	(Japan) Takeshi Kamura	(Chinese Taipei) Chen Chung-jen (Chinese Taipei) Lin Yen-jui	21–13, 21–17	(gold) Winner	
2012	Osaka International	(Japan) Takeshi Kamura	(Indonesia) Marcus Fernaldi Gideon (Indonesia) Agripina Prima Rahmanto Putra	21–17, 21–23, 21–18	(gold) Winner	
2012	Scottish International	(Japan) Takeshi Kamura	(Japan) Hiroyuki Saeki (Japan) Ryota Taohata	16–21, 21–11, 21–17	(gold) Winner	
2013	Austrian International	(Japan) Takeshi Kamura	(Japan) Hiroyuki Saeki (Japan) Ryota Taohata	18–21, 21–15, 18–21	(silver) Runner-up	

BWF International Challenge tournament
