= Cheng Chi-ya =

Taiwanese badminton player (born 1992)

Cheng Chi-ya 程琪雅
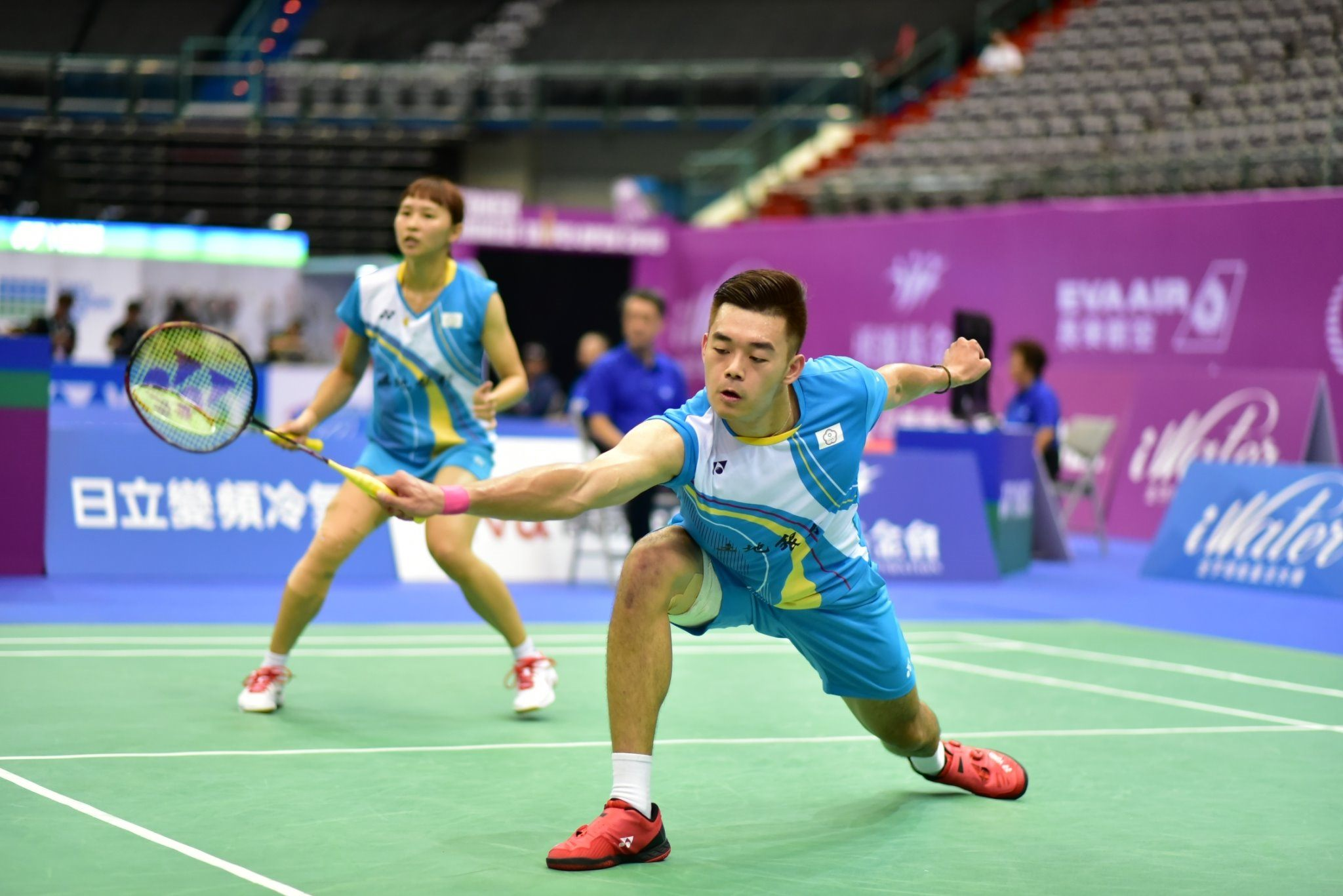
- Chen chi-ya (back) with Wang Chi Lin (front)

Personal information
- Born: 26 December 1992 (age 33) Yunlin County, Taiwan
- Height: 1.65 m (5 ft 5 in)

Sport
- Country: Taiwan
- Sport: Badminton
- Handedness: Right

Women's singles & doubles
- Highest ranking: 47 (WS 29 October 2015); 42 (WD 5 November 2019); 22 (XD 5 November 2019)
- Current ranking: 42 (WD), 22 (XD) (5 November 2019)
- BWF profile

Cheng Chi-ya (Chinese: 程琪雅; pinyin: Chéng Qíyǎ; born 26 December 1992) is a Taiwanese badminton player. She won her first international title at the 2013 Polish International Series in the women's singles event.

== Achievements ==
=== BWF World Tour (2 runners-up) ===
The BWF World Tour, announced on 19 March 2017 and implemented in 2018, is a series of elite badminton tournaments, sanctioned by Badminton World Federation (BWF). The BWF World Tour are divided into six levels, namely World Tour Finals, Super 1000, Super 750, Super 500, Super 300 (part of the HSBC World Tour), and the BWF Tour Super 100.

Mixed doubles
Year	Tournament	Level	Partner	Opponent	Score	Result
2019	Macau Open	Super 300	(Chinese Taipei) Wang Chi-lin	(Thailand) Dechapol Puavaranukroh (Thailand) Sapsiree Taerattanachai	11–21, 8–21	(silver) Runner-up
2019	Spain Masters	Super 300	(Chinese Taipei) Wang Chi-lin	(South Korea) Seo Seung-jae (South Korea) Chae Yoo-jung	18–21, 15–21	(silver) Runner-up

=== BWF International Challenge/Series (1 title, 3 runners-up) ===
Women's singles
Year	Tournament	Opponent	Score	Result
2014	Austrian International	(Chinese Taipei) Pai Hsiao-ma	18–21, 11–21	(silver) Runner-up
2013	Czech International	(Scotland) Kirsty Gilmour	18–21, 10–21	(silver) Runner-up
2013	Polish International	(Chinese Taipei) Hsu Ya-ching	21–18, 14–21, 21–17	(gold) Winner
2013	Belgian International	(Indonesia) Febby Angguni	20–22, 11–21	(silver) Runner-up

BWF International Challenge tournament
BWF International Series tournament
