= Dong Wenjing =

Chinese badminton player

Dong Wenjing 董文静
Personal information
- Born: 15 June 1998 (age 28) Guangxi, China
- Height: 1.70 m (5 ft 7 in)

Sport
- Country: China
- Sport: Badminton
- Handedness: Right

Women's & mixed doubles
- Highest ranking: 20 (WD 14 January 2020); 300 (XD 12 March 2019)
- Current ranking: 106 (WD 13 September 2022)
- BWF profile
Medal record
Women's badminton
Representing China
Asia Mixed Team Championships
Gold medal – first place	2019 Hong Kong	Mixed team
Asian Team Championships
Silver medal – second place	2018 Alor Setar	Women's team

Dong Wenjing
- Traditional Chinese: 董文靜
- Simplified Chinese: 董文静
Transcriptions
Standard Mandarin
- Hanyu Pinyin: Dǒng Wénjìng
- IPA: [tʊ̀ŋ wə̌n.tɕîŋ]

Dong Wenjing (Chinese: 董文静; pinyin: Dǒng Wénjìng; born 15 June 1998) is a Chinese badminton player from Guangxi. She was part of the national women's team that won the silver medal at the 2018 Badminton Asia Team Championships held in Alor Setar, Malaysia. Dong also play for the national team at the 2019 Asia Mixed Team Championships, clinched a gold medal and won the Tong Yun Kai Cup.
