= 2015 Thailand Open Grand Prix Gold =

Tournament details
- Dates: 29 September – 4 October 2015
- Level: Grand Prix Gold
- Total prize money: US$120,000
- Venue: Thunder Dome, Muangthong Thani
- Location: Bangkok, Thailand

Champions
- Men's singles: (South Korea) Lee Hyun-il
- Women's singles: (South Korea) Sung Ji-hyun
- Men's doubles: (Indonesia) Wahyu Nayaka (Indonesia) Ade Yusuf Santoso
- Women's doubles: (China) Huang Dongping (China) Li Yinhui
- Mixed doubles: (South Korea) Choi Sol-gyu (South Korea) Eom Hye-won

The 2015 Thailand Open Grand Prix Gold was the twentieth grand prix gold and grand prix tournament of the 2015 BWF Grand Prix and Grand Prix Gold. The tournament was held in Thunder Dome, Muangthong Thani, Bangkok, Thailand September 29 – October 4, 2015 and had a total purse of $120,000.

== Men's singles ==
=== Seeds ===
1. (South Korea) Son Wan-ho (quarter-final)
2. (Hong Kong) Hu Yun (third round)
3. (Indonesia) Tommy Sugiarto (withdrew)
4. (South Korea) Lee Hyun-il (champion)
5. (Hong Kong) Wei Nan (withdrew)
6. (Thailand) Tanongsak Saensomboonsuk (second round)
7. (Indonesia) Dionysius Hayom Rumbaka (Semi final)
8. (Thailand) Boonsak Ponsana (third round)
9. (Hong Kong) Ng Ka Long (quarter-final)
10. (Hong Kong) Wong Wing Ki (second round)
11. (Malaysia) Chong Wei Feng (first round)
12. (Malaysia) Zulfadli Zulkiffli (withdrew)
13. (Indonesia) Jonatan Christie (third round)
14. (Singapore) Derek Wong Zi Liang (third round)
15. (Japan) Kazumasa Sakai (third round)
16. (Indonesia) Firman Abdul Kholik (third round)

=== Finals ===
Quarterfinals
1	(South Korea) Son Wan-ho	12	12
(Indonesia) Ihsan Maulana Mustofa	21	21
(China) Qiao Bin	20	18
(South Korea) Jeon Hyeok-jin	22	21
9	(Hong Kong) Ng Ka Long	15	11
4	(South Korea) Lee Hyun-il	21	21
7	(Indonesia) Dionysius Hayom Rumbaka	21	21
(Indonesia) Sony Dwi Kuncoro	14	11

Semifinals
(Indonesia) Ihsan Maulana Mustofa	21	21
(South Korea) Jeon Hyeok-jin	15	17
4	(South Korea) Lee Hyun-il	21	21
7	(Indonesia) Dionysius Hayom Rumbaka	17	13

Final
(Indonesia) Ihsan Maulana Mustofa	17	24	8
4	(South Korea) Lee Hyun-il	21	22	21

=== Top half ===
==== Section 1 ====
First Round
1	(South Korea) Son W-h	21	28
(Japan) R Takeshita	16	26
(Japan) K Nishimoto	19	21	21
(Indonesia) T A Mahbub	21	12	16
11	(Malaysia) Chong W F	4	15
(Indonesia) S Santoso	21	21
(Thailand) M Narongrit	18	23	23
(Malaysia) Liew D	21	21	21

Second Round
1	(South Korea) Son W-h	24	21
(Japan) K Nishimoto	22	17
(Indonesia) S Santoso	21	22
(Thailand) M Narongrit	17	20

Third Round
1	(South Korea) Son W-h	11	21	21
(Indonesia) S Santoso	21	17	12

==== Section 2 ====
First Round
6	(Thailand) T Saensomboonsuk	21	21
(Netherlands) E Meijs	16	13
(Indonesia) I M Mustofa	21	21
Q8	(Thailand) C Nobsamrong	7	12
14	(Singapore) D Wong	18	21	21
(China) Huang YX	21	15	13
Q2	(Thailand) K Vitidsarn	17	7
(Indonesia) R A Megananda	21	21

Second Round
6	(Thailand) T Saensomboonsuk	16	18
(Indonesia) I M Mustofa	21	21
14	(Singapore) D Wong	21	22
(Indonesia) R A Megananda	10	20

Third Round
(Indonesia) I M Mustofa	21	21
14	(Singapore) D Wong	19	13

==== Section 3 ====
First Round
PFQ	(Thailand) P Boontun	7	8
(China) Shi YQ	21	21
(Indonesia) A Yunus	20	16
(Thailand) S Thammasin	22	21
10	(Hong Kong) Wong W K	21	21
Q3	(Thailand) T Kittinaowarat	14	10
Q1	(Thailand) K Cheiklinthes	9	6
(China) Qiao B	21	21

Second Round
(China) Shi YQ	17	21	21
(Thailand) S Thammasin	21	19	9
10	(Hong Kong) Wong W K	16	15
(China) Qiao B	21	21

Third Round
(China) Shi YQ	15	17
(China) Qiao B	21	21

==== Section 4 ====
First Round
PFQ	(Thailand) P Nipornram	20	18
(Indonesia) S H Rhustavito	22	21
(Thailand) A Namkul	15	7
(South Korea) Jeon H-j	21	21
13	(Indonesia) J Christie	21	21
(Thailand) K Atthaviroj	14	17
Q4	(Thailand) A Uthaiteerakomen	8	10
(Thailand) K Wangcharoen	21	21

Second Round
(Indonesia) S H Rhustavito	5	17
(South Korea) Jeon H-j	21	21
13	(Indonesia) J Christie	21	21
(Thailand) K Wangcharoen	10	14

Third Round
(South Korea) Jeon H-j	12	21	21
13	(Indonesia) J Christie	21	12	19

=== Bottom half ===
==== Section 5 ====
First Round
(Hong Kong) Tam C H	15	9
(Indonesia) A S Ginting	21	21
(India) A Yelegar	7	21	6
9	(Hong Kong) Ng K L	21	15	21
(Thailand) T Huansuriya	10	14
(Indonesia) E Sukamta	21	21
(Malaysia) Zh Zulkiffli	14	10
8	(Thailand) B Ponsana	21	21

Second Round
(Indonesia) A S Ginting	12	19
9	(Hong Kong) Ng K L	21	21
(Indonesia) E Sukamta	14	13
8	(Thailand) B Ponsana	21	21

Third Round
9	(Hong Kong) Ng K L	21	18	22
8	(Thailand) B Ponsana	19	21	20

==== Section 6 ====
First Round
(Thailand) S Avihingsanon	21	21
(Hong Kong) Chan Y K	17	18
Q6	(Thailand) N Nantatheero	11	22	17
16	(Indonesia) F A Kholik	21	20	21
(Thailand) K Leelavechabutr	22	21
(Indonesia) W K Henrikho	20	16
(Indonesia) M B Pangisthu	21	12	16
4	(South Korea) Lee H-i	19	21	21

Second Round
(Thailand) S Avihingsanon	8	21	12
16	(Indonesia) F A Kholik	21	11	21
(Thailand) K Leelavechabutr	10	14
4	(South Korea) Lee H-i	21	21

Third Round
16	(Indonesia) F A Kholik	13	15
4	(South Korea) Lee H-i	21	21

==== Section 7 ====
First Round
Q5	(Thailand) C Sukasem	11	12
(Malaysia) Tan C S	21	21
PFQ	(Indonesia) K Akbar	4	5
15	(Japan) K Sakai	21	21
(Thailand) K Phetpradab	21	15	21
(Malaysia) A Abdul Latif	13	21	11
Q7	(Thailand) K Laotrakul	10	11
7	(Indonesia) D H Rumbaka	21	21

Second Round
(Malaysia) Tan C S	17	15
15	(Japan) K Sakai	21	21
(Thailand) K Phetpradab	13	10
7	(Indonesia) D H Rumbaka	21	21

Third Round
15	(Japan) K Sakai	15	15
7	(Indonesia) D H Rumbaka	21	21

==== Section 8 ====
First Round
(Indonesia) S D Kuncoro	21	14	21
(Thailand) P Thongnuam	15	21	13
(China) Lin GP	21	21
PFQ	(Brunei) J Woon	5	10
(Japan) K Tsuneyama	21	17	21
(Indonesia) W Y Prasetyo	16	21	19
(United States) S Pongnairat	14	15
2	(Hong Kong) Hu Y	21	21

Second Round
(Indonesia) S D Kuncoro	21	21
(China) Lin GP	15	5
(Japan) K Tsuneyama	18	17
2	(Hong Kong) Hu Y	21	21

Third Round
(Indonesia) S D Kuncoro	21	21
2	(Hong Kong) Hu Y	15	11

== Women's singles ==
=== Seeds ===
1. (Thailand) Ratchanok Inthanon (Semi final)
2. (South Korea) Sung Ji-hyun (champion)
3. (China) Sun Yu (Semi final)
4. (South Korea) Bae Yeon-ju (first round)
5. (Thailand) Busanan Ongbumrungpan (second round)
6. (Japan) Sayaka Sato (quarter-final)
7. (Thailand) Porntip Buranaprasertsuk (second round)
8. (Indonesia) Maria Febe Kusumastuti (first round)

=== Finals ===
Semifinals
1	(Thailand) Ratchanok Inthanon	20	21	17
(Singapore) Liang Xiaoyu	22	13	21
3	(China) Sun Yu	10	18
2	(South Korea) Sung Ji-hyun	21	21

Final
(Singapore) Liang Xiaoyu	11	14
2	(South Korea) Sung Ji-hyun	21	21

=== Top half ===
==== Section 1 ====
First Round
1	(Thailand) R Intanon	21	21
Q1	(Thailand) C Jucharoen	10	10
Q3	(Thailand) T Poopradubsil	21	21
Q2	(Thailand) N Aimsaard	17	8
6	(Japan) S Sato	21	19	21
(Thailand) N Jindapon	13	21	17
PFQ	(Indonesia) Fitriani	21	21
(Indonesia) H Ramadini	9	15

Second Round
1	(Thailand) R Intanon	21	21
Q3	(Thailand) T Poopradubsil	11	10
6	(Japan) S Sato	21	21
PFQ	(Indonesia) Fitriani	12	14

Quarterfinals
1	(Thailand) R Intanon	9	21	21
6	(Japan) S Sato	21	19	12

==== Section 2 ====
First Round
4	(South Korea) Bae Y-j	21	18	17
(China) Chen YF	17	21	21
(Singapore) Liang XY	21	21
(Australia) W Chen	4	15
8	(Indonesia) M F Kusumastuti	13	16
(Thailand) P Chochuwong	21	21
(Italy) J Cicognini	11	18
(Hong Kong) Yip P Y	21	21

Second Round
(China) Chen YF	16	21	16
(Singapore) Liang XY	21	14	21
(Thailand) P Chochuwong	21	17	21
(Hong Kong) Yip P Y	18	21	19

Quarterfinals
(Singapore) Liang XY	21	23
(Thailand) P Chochuwong	12	21

=== Bottom half ===
==== Section 3 ====
First Round
(China) He BJ	21	21
(Indonesia) A Firdasari	9	13
(Singapore) Chen JY	18	9
5	(Thailand) B Ongbumrungpan	21	21
(United States) J Subandhi	21	10
PFQ	(Thailand) S Suwannakitborihan	23	21
(Indonesia) R Hartawan	16	15
3	(China) Sun Y	21	21

Second Round
(China) He BJ	18	21	21
5	(Thailand) B Ongbumrungpan	21	16	13
PFQ	(Thailand) S Suwannakitborihan	21	17	9
3	(China) Sun Y	12	21	21

Quarterfinals
(China) He BJ	19	20
3	(China) Sun Y	21	22

==== Section 4 ====
First Round
(Thailand) S Katethong	13	15
(Malaysia) Tee J Y	21	21
(Japan) K Imabeppu	14	14
7	(Thailand) P Buranaprasertsuk	21	21
(Indonesia) G M Tunjung	18	21	21
Q4	(Thailand) P Chaiwan	21	17	17
(Indonesia) D D Ayustine	11	10
2	(South Korea) Sung J-h	21	21

Second Round
(Malaysia) Tee J Y	21	19	21
7	(Thailand) P Buranaprasertsuk	19	21	16
(Indonesia) G M Tunjung	15	11
2	(South Korea) Sung J-h	21	21

Quarterfinals
(Malaysia) Tee J Y	11	11
2	(South Korea) Sung J-h	21	21

== Men's doubles ==
=== Seeds ===
1. (South Korea) Ko Sung-hyun / Shin Baek-cheol (withdrew)
2. (Indonesia) Angga Pratama / Ricky Karanda Suwardi (Semi final)
3. (China) Li Junhui / Liu Yuchen (second round)
4. (South Korea) Kim Ki-jung / Kim Sa-rang (withdrew)
5. (Indonesia) Wahyu Nayaka / Ade Yusuf (champion)
6. (Japan) Kenta Kazuno / Kazushi Yamada (second round)
7. (Indonesia) Andrei Adistia / Hendra Aprida Gunawan (first round)
8. (China) Wang Yilv / Zhang Wen (second round)

=== Finals ===
Semifinals
5	(Indonesia) Wahyu Nayaka (Indonesia) Ade Yusuf	21	21
(Indonesia) Markus Fernaldi Gideon (Indonesia) Kevin Sanjaya Sukamuljo	18	16
(Malaysia) Koo Kien Keat (Malaysia) Tan Boon Heong	21	17	21
2	(Indonesia) Angga Pratama (Indonesia) Ricky Karanda Suwardi	19	21	16

Final
5	(Indonesia) Wahyu Nayaka (Indonesia) Ade Yusuf	20	23	21
(Malaysia) Koo Kien Keat (Malaysia) Tan Boon Heong	22	21	16

=== Top half ===
==== Section 1 ====
First Round
PFQ	(Thailand) M Narongrit (Thailand) K Tantianankul	16	14
Q3	(Singapore) T Hee (Singapore) Loh K H	21	21
(Thailand) D Puavaranukroh (Thailand) K Kedren	21	21
(Indonesia) I Fadhilah (Thailand) P Vilailak	10	13
5	(Indonesia) W Nayaka (Indonesia) A Yusuf	16	21	21
(China) Huang KX (China) Zheng SW	21	12	14
(Malaysia) Hoon T H (Malaysia) Lim K W	15	21	21
Q4	(China) Han CK (China) Zhou HD	21	19	18

Second Round
Q3	(Singapore) T Hee (Singapore) Loh K H	22	12
(Thailand) D Puavaranukroh (Thailand) K Kedren	24	21
5	(Indonesia) W Nayaka (Indonesia) A Yusuf	21	21
(Malaysia) Hoon T H (Malaysia) Lim K W	12	14

Quarterfinals
(Thailand) D Puavaranukroh (Thailand) K Kedren	18	21	14
5	(Indonesia) W Nayaka (Indonesia) A Yusuf	21	14	21

==== Section 2 ====
First Round
3	(China) Li JH (China) Liu YC	17	21	21
(India) A Francis (India) A Vishnu	21	15	15
(Thailand) W Ampunsuwan (Thailand) T Isriyanate	18	19
(Hong Kong) Or C C (Hong Kong) Tang C M	21	21
6	(Japan) K Kazuno (Japan) K Yamada	21	22
PFQ	(Thailand) R Chandawan (Thailand) C Tochareonbodee	14	20
(Indonesia) M F Gideon (Indonesia) K S Sukamuljo	21	21
Q2	(Thailand) W Buranakuea (Thailand) P Thongnuam	16	16

Second Round
3	(China) Li JH (China) Liu YC	23	17	14
(Hong Kong) Or C C (Hong Kong) Tang C M	21	21	21
6	(Japan) K Kazuno (Japan) K Yamada	18	13
(Indonesia) M F Gideon (Indonesia) K S Sukamuljo	21	21

Quarterfinals
(Hong Kong) Or C C (Hong Kong) Tang C M	9	15
(Indonesia) M F Gideon (Indonesia) K S Sukamuljo	21	21

=== Bottom half ===
==== Section 3 ====
First Round
(Malaysia) Chooi K M (Malaysia) Ow Y H	21	21
(Philippines) P Escueta (Philippines) R Estanislao	18	16
(Hong Kong) Chan Y L (Hong Kong) Lee C H	15	13
8	(China) Wang YL (China) Zhang W	21	21
(Malaysia) Koo K K (Malaysia) Tan B H	21	22
PFQ	(Hong Kong) Chan T K (Hong Kong) Law C H	17	20
(United States) P Chew (United States) S Pongnairat	21	21	22
PFQ	(Thailand) A Thaptimdong (Thailand) B Thumpanichwong	15	23	24

Second Round
(Malaysia) Chooi K M (Malaysia) Ow Y H	21	14	21
8	(China) Wang YL (China) Zhang W	19	21	16
(Malaysia) Koo K K (Malaysia) Tan B H	21	21
PFQ	(Thailand) A Thaptimdong (Thailand) B Thumpanichwong	16	16

Quarterfinals
(Malaysia) Chooi K M (Malaysia) Ow Y H	17	11
(Malaysia) Koo K K (Malaysia) Tan B H	21	21

==== Section 4 ====
First Round
(Indonesia) M Kido (Indonesia) A Putra	21	21
(Thailand) K Cholprasertsuk (Thailand) S Suharitdumrong	18	16
(Japan) T Inoue (Japan) Y Kaneko	21	21
7	(Indonesia) A Adistia (Indonesia) H A Gunawan	16	12
(Thailand) B Issara (Thailand) N Puangpuapech	17	14
(Indonesia) B Angriawan (Indonesia) R A Saputro	21	21
Q1	(Thailand) S Jomkoh (Thailand) N Uakoolwarawat	12	16
2	(Indonesia) A Pratama (Indonesia) R K Suwardi	21	21

Second Round
(Indonesia) M Kido (Indonesia) A Putra	17	9
(Japan) T Inoue (Japan) Y Kaneko	21	21
(Indonesia) B Angriawan (Indonesia) R A Saputro	13	9^{r}
2	(Indonesia) A Pratama (Indonesia) R K Suwardi	21	11

Quarterfinals
(Japan) T Inoue (Japan) Y Kaneko	15	7
2	(Indonesia) A Pratama (Indonesia) R K Suwardi	21	21

== Women's doubles ==
=== Seeds ===
1. (Indonesia) Nitya Krishinda Maheswari / Greysia Polii (withdrew)
2. (Malaysia) Vivian Hoo Kah Mun / Woon Khe Wei (quarter-final)
3. (Japan) Shizuka Matsuo / Mami Naito (quarter-final)
4. (Thailand) Puttita Supajirakul / Sapsiree Taerattanachai (first round)
5. (China) Tang Jinhua / Tian Qing (withdrew)
6. (Malaysia) Amelia Alicia Anscelly / Soong Fie Cho (quarter-final)
7. (Thailand) Jongkongphan Kittiharakul / Rawinda Prajongjai (first round)
8. (South Korea) Go Ah-ra / Yoo Hae-won (Semi final)

=== Finals ===
Semifinals
(South Korea) Chang Ye-na (South Korea) Lee So-hee	21	21
(China) Chen Qingchen (China) Jia Yifan	10	12
(China) Huang Dongping (China) Li Yinhui	21	21
8	(South Korea) Go Ah-ra (South Korea) Yoo Hae-won	16	14

Final
(South Korea) Chang Ye-na (South Korea) Lee So-hee	22	11	15
(China) Huang Dongping (China) Li Yinhui	20	21	21

=== Top half ===
==== Section 1 ====
First Round
PFQ	(Thailand) S Kanchanasaka (Thailand) K Sukklad	10	6
(Malaysia) Lim Y L (Malaysia) Lee M Y	21	21
(Thailand) N Chatputtarn (Thailand) F Loog	8	8
(South Korea) Chang Y-n (South Korea) Lee S-h	21	21
6	(Malaysia) A Anscelly (Malaysia) Soong F C	13	21	21
PFQ	(Thailand) S Amitrapai (Thailand) P Chochuwong	21	11	7
(Indonesia) K Dewi (Indonesia) V Marissa	21	21
(Thailand) N Chatupornkarnchana (Thailand) S Chumnibannakarn	19	6

Second Round
(Malaysia) Lim Y L (Malaysia) Lee M Y	15	10
(South Korea) Chang Y-n (South Korea) Lee S-h	21	21
6	(Malaysia) A Anscelly (Malaysia) Soong F C	21	21
(Indonesia) K Dewi (Indonesia) V Marissa	16	15

Quarterfinals
(South Korea) Chang Y-n (South Korea) Lee S-h	22	21
6	(Malaysia) A Anscelly (Malaysia) Soong F C	20	18

==== Section 2 ====
First Round
3	(Japan) S Matsuo (Japan) M Naito
Q4	BYE
(Hong Kong) Poon L Y (Hong Kong) Tse Y S	21	21
(Singapore) S M Sari (Singapore) Tan W H	18	11
7	(Thailand) J Kittiharakul (Thailand) R Prajongjai	18	12
(China) Chen QC (China) Jia YF	21	21
(South Korea) Jung K-e (South Korea) Shin S-c	21	21
(Australia) Wendy Chen (Indonesia) Y Y Susanto	8	12

Second Round
3	(Japan) S Matsuo (Japan) M Naito	22	27	21
(Hong Kong) Poon L Y (Hong Kong) Tse Y S	20	29	13
(China) Chen QC (China) Jia YF	21	21
(South Korea) Jung K-e (South Korea) Shin S-c	14	15

Quarterfinals
3	(Japan) S Matsuo (Japan) M Naito	17	13
(China) Chen QC (China) Jia YF	21	21

=== Bottom half ===
==== Section 3 ====
First Round
Q1	BYE
(Japan) A Kurihara (Japan) N Shinoya
(Thailand) N Jaiareree (Thailand) T Kaweenuntavong	21	21
PFQ	(Thailand) R Laisuan (Thailand) K Ostermeyer	16	18
Q3	(Thailand) R Iamratanamaetheekul (Thailand) S Mingchua	21	21
(Thailand) P Chamnaktan (Thailand) K Sudjaipraparat	10	17
(China) Huang DP (China) Li YH	21	14	21
4	(Thailand) P Supajirakul (Thailand) S Taerattanachai	19	21	10

Second Round
(Japan) A Kurihara (Japan) N Shinoya	21	21
(Thailand) N Jaiareree (Thailand) T Kaweenuntavong	7	14
Q3	(Thailand) R Iamratanamaetheekul (Thailand) S Mingchua	15	11
(China) Huang DP (China) Li YH	21	21

Quarterfinals
(Japan) A Kurihara (Japan) N Shinoya	21	14	14
(China) Huang DP (China) Li YH	19	21	21

==== Section 4 ====
First Round
(Indonesia) A Rahayu (Indonesia) J F Sugiarto	21	21
Q2	(Thailand) P Pransopon (Thailand) S Suwannakitborihan	16	12
(Thailand) C Chaladchalam (Thailand) P Muenwong	17	18
8	(South Korea) Go A-r (South Korea) Yoo H-w	21	21
(Indonesia) W Anggraini (Indonesia) P Zebadiah	13	18
(Hong Kong) Chan T K (Hong Kong) Yuen S Y	21	21
(Indonesia) K N Hanadia (Indonesia) D T Permatasari	13	5
2	(Malaysia) V Hoo (Malaysia) Woon K W	21	21

Second Round
(Indonesia) A Rahayu (Indonesia) J F Sugiarto	16	10
8	(South Korea) Go A-r (South Korea) Yoo H-w	21	21
(Hong Kong) Chan T K (Hong Kong) Yuen S Y	17	13
2	(Malaysia) V Hoo (Malaysia) Woon KW	21	21

Quarterfinals
8	(South Korea) Go A-r (South Korea) Yoo H-w	19	21	21
2	(Malaysia) V Hoo (Malaysia) Woon KW	21	11	16

== Mixed doubles ==
=== Seeds ===
1. (South Korea) Ko Sung-hyun / Kim Ha-na (Semi final)
2. (Indonesia) Riky Widianto / Richi Puspita Dili (second round)
3. (Indonesia) Praveen Jordan / Debby Susanto (final)
4. (Hong Kong) Lee Chun Hei / Chau Hoi Wah (first round)
5. (China) Zheng Siwei / Chen Qingchen (second round)
6. (Indonesia) Edi Subaktiar / Gloria Emanuelle Widjaja (first round)
7. (China) Huang Kaixiang / Huang Dongping (Semi final)
8. (Hong Kong) Chan Yun Lung / Tse Ying Suet (quarter-final)

=== Finals ===
Semifinals
1	(South Korea) Ko Sung-hyun (South Korea) Kim Ha-na	16	16
3	(Indonesia) Praveen Jordan (Indonesia) Debby Susanto	21	21
7	(China) Huang Kaixiang (China) Huang Dongping	14	15
(South Korea) Choi Sol-gyu (South Korea) Eom Hye-won	21	21

Final
3	(Indonesia) Praveen Jordan (Indonesia) Debby Susanto	19	21	16
(South Korea) Choi Sol-gyu (South Korea) Eom Hye-won	21	17	21

=== Top half ===
==== Section 1 ====
First Round
1	(South Korea) Ko S-h (South Korea) Kim H-n	24	21
(Indonesia) R Alexander (Indonesia) M D Oktaviani	22	15
(Indonesia) M Kido (Indonesia) P Zebadiah	21	21
Q1	(Thailand) C Charoenkitamorn (Thailand) P Pransopon	13	15
5	(China) Zheng SW (China) Chen QC	21	21
PFQ	(Indonesia) D Juang (Indonesia) A P L Variella	7	16
(China) Liu YC (China) Li YH	21	21
(Indonesia) F Kurniawan (Indonesia) K Dewi	17	17

Second Round
1	(South Korea) Ko S-h (South Korea) Kim H-n	21	21
(Indonesia) M Kido (Indonesia) P Zebadiah	17	12
5	(China) Zheng SW (China) Chen QC	21	20	17
(China) Liu YC (China) Li YH	18	22	21

Quarterfinals
1	(South Korea) Ko S-h (South Korea) Kim H-n	21	21
(China) Liu YC (China) Li YH	17	12

==== Section 2 ====
First Round
3	(Indonesia) P Jordan (Indonesia) D Susanto	21	21
(China) Zhang W (China) Ou DN	14	18
(Malaysia) Tan A Q (Malaysia) Lai P J	21	21
Q2	(Thailand) W Ampunsuwan (Thailand) P Chochuwong	10	13
8	(Hong Kong) Chan Y L (Hong Kong) Tse Y S	21	21
(Singapore) T Hee (Singapore) Tan W H	5	12
PFQ	(Hong Kong) Tang C M (Hong Kong) Poon L Y	21	21
(India) A Vishnu (India) A Balan	12	19

Second Round
3	(Indonesia) P Jordan (Indonesia) D Susanto	21	21
(Malaysia) Tan A Q (Malaysia) Lai P J	18	19
8	(Hong Kong) Chan Y L (Hong Kong) Tse Y S	21	21
PFQ	(Hong Kong) Tang CM (Hong Kong) Poon LY	15	18

Quarterfinals
3	(Indonesia) P Jordan (Indonesia) D Susanto	21	19	21
8	(Hong Kong) Chan Y L (Hong Kong) Tse Y S	15	21	14

=== Bottom half ===
==== Section 3 ====
First Round
(United States) P Chew (United States) J Subandhi	15	14
PFQ	(Japan) K Kazuno (Japan) A Kurihara	21	21
Q3	(Thailand) T Isriyanate (Thailand) S Amitrapai	19	19
7	(China) Huang KX (China) Huang DP	21	21
PFQ	(China) Han CK (China) Jia YF	15	21	21
(Indonesia) I Fadhilah (Indonesia) W Anggraini	21	11	18
(Thailand) S Prapakamol (Thailand) S Thoungthongkam	14	21	21
4	(Hong Kong) Lee CH (Hong Kong) Chau HW	21	18	13

Second Round
PFQ	(Japan) K Kazuno (Japan) A Kurihara	10	18
7	(China) Huang KX (China) Huang DP	21	21
PFQ	(China) Han CK (China) Jia YF	21	21	21
(Thailand) S Prapakamol (Thailand) S Thoungthongkam	23	13	10

Quarterfinals
7	(China) Huang KX (China) Huang DP	21	21	21
PFQ	(China) Han CK (China) Jia YF	23	16	16

==== Section 4 ====
First Round
(Indonesia) A Adistia (Indonesia) V Marissa	16	16
(South Korea) Choi S-g (South Korea) Eom H-w	21	21
(Singapore) D B Chrisnanta (Singapore) V Neo	21	14	22
6	(Indonesia) E Subaktiar (Indonesia) G E Widjaja	17	21	20
(India) G Venkat (India) J Dewangan	5	17
(Japan) Y Kaneko (Japan) S Matsuo	21	21
Q4	(Thailand) P Kunaanuvit (Thailand) K Sudjaipraparat	11	9
2	(Indonesia) R Widianto (Indonesia) R P Dili	21	21

Second Round
(South Korea) Choi S-g (South Korea) Eom H-w	21	21
(Singapore) D B Chrisnanta (Singapore) V Neo	14	19
(Japan) Y Kaneko (Japan) S Matsuo	19	21	21
2	(Indonesia) R Widianto (Indonesia) R P Dili	21	17	18

Quarterfinals
(South Korea) Choi S-g (South Korea) Eom H-w	21	18	21
(Japan) Y Kaneko (Japan) S Matsuo	16	21	14

Preceded by 2015 Vietnam Open Grand Prix	BWF Grand Prix and Grand Prix Gold; 2015 BWF Season	Succeeded by 2015 Dutch Open Grand Prix
