= 2019 Badminton Asia Championships =

Tournament details
- Dates: 23–28 April
- Total prize money: US$400,000
- Venue: Wuhan Sports Center Gymnasium
- Location: Wuhan, China

The 2019 Badminton Asia Championships, was a badminton tournament which took place at the Wuhan Sports Center Gymnasium in China from 23 to 28 April 2019 and had a total purse of $400,000.

== Tournament ==
The 2019 Badminton Asia Championships was the 38th edition of the Badminton Asia Championships. This tournament was hosted by the Chinese Badminton Association, with the sanction of Badminton Asia.

=== Venue ===
This international tournament was held at the Wuhan Sports Center Gymnasium in Wuhan, China.

=== Point distribution ===
This tournament is graded based on the BWF points system for the BWF World Tour Super 500 event. Below is the table with the point distribution for each phase of the tournament.

Winner	Runner-up	3/4	5/8	9/16	17/32	33/64	65/128
9,200	7,800	6,420	5,040	3,600	2,220	880	430

=== Prize money ===
The total prize money for this year tournament is US$400,000. Distribution of prize money is in accordance with BWF regulations.

Event	Winner	Finals	Semifinals	Quarterfinals	Last 16
Singles	$30,000	$15,200	$5,800	$2,400	$1,400
Doubles	$31,600	$15,200	$5,600	$2,900	$1,500

== Medal summary ==
=== Medalists ===
Event	Gold	Silver	Bronze
Men's singles	(Japan) Kento Momota	(China) Shi Yuqi	(Vietnam) Nguyễn Tiến Minh
Men's singles	(Japan) Kento Momota	(China) Shi Yuqi	(Chinese Taipei) Chou Tien-chen
Women's singles	(Japan) Akane Yamaguchi	(China) He Bingjiao	(China) Chen Yufei
Women's singles	(Japan) Akane Yamaguchi	(China) He Bingjiao	(China) Cai Yanyan
Men's doubles	(Japan) Hiroyuki Endo (Japan) Yuta Watanabe	(Indonesia) Marcus Fernaldi Gideon (Indonesia) Kevin Sanjaya Sukamuljo	(Japan) Takeshi Kamura (Japan) Keigo Sonoda
Men's doubles	(Japan) Hiroyuki Endo (Japan) Yuta Watanabe	(Indonesia) Marcus Fernaldi Gideon (Indonesia) Kevin Sanjaya Sukamuljo	(South Korea) Kang Min-hyuk (South Korea) Kim Won-ho
Women's doubles	(China) Chen Qingchen (China) Jia Yifan	(Japan) Mayu Matsumoto (Japan) Wakana Nagahara	(Japan) Yuki Fukushima (Japan) Sayaka Hirota
Women's doubles	(China) Chen Qingchen (China) Jia Yifan	(Japan) Mayu Matsumoto (Japan) Wakana Nagahara	(Indonesia) Della Destiara Haris (Indonesia) Rizki Amelia Pradipta
Mixed doubles	(China) Wang Yilü (China) Huang Dongping	(China) He Jiting (China) Du Yue	(China) Zheng Siwei (China) Huang Yaqiong
Mixed doubles	(China) Wang Yilü (China) Huang Dongping	(China) He Jiting (China) Du Yue	(Thailand) Dechapol Puavaranukroh (Thailand) Sapsiree Taerattanachai

=== Medal table ===
* Host nation (China)

Rank	Nation	Gold	Silver	Bronze	Total
1	Japan	3	1	2	6
2	China	2	3	3	8
3	Indonesia	0	1	1	2
4	Chinese Taipei	0	0	1	1
4	South Korea	0	0	1	1
4	Thailand	0	0	1	1
4	Vietnam	0	0	1	1
Totals (7 entries)		5	5	10	20

== Group stage ==
=== Final standings ===
Group	Men's singles	Women's singles	Men's doubles
A	(Nepal) Ratnajit Tamang	(Macau) Ng Weng Chi	(Hong Kong) Lam Wai Lok (Hong Kong) Li Kuen Hon
B	(Malaysia) Cheam June Wei	(Hong Kong) Yeung Sum Yee	(Brunei) Ahmad Mahyuddin Haji Abas (Brunei) Jaspar Yu Woon Chai
C	(Hong Kong) Hu Yun	(Sri Lanka) Kavidi Sirimannage	(Hong Kong) Chang Tak Ching (Hong Kong) Yeung Ming Nok
D	(Macau) Pui Pang Fong	(Hong Kong) Cheung Ying Mei	(Hong Kong) Chan Tsz Kit (Hong Kong) Yeung Shing Choi

=== Results ===
==== Men's singles ====
===== Group A =====
Rank	Player	Pts	Pld	W	L	SF	SA	PF	PA
1	(Nepal) Ratnajit Tamang	1	1	1	0	2	1	61	48
2	(Laos) Namboun Luangamath	0	1	0	1	1	2	48	61

Date		Score		Set 1	Set 2	Set 3
April 23; 10:40	Ratnajit Tamang (Nepal)	2–1	(Laos) Namboun Luangamath	21–15	19–21	21–12

===== Group B =====
Rank	Player	Pts	Pld	W	L	SF	SA	PF	PA
1	(Malaysia) Cheam June Wei	2	2	2	0	4	1	103	77
2	(Sri Lanka) Niluka Karunaratne	1	2	1	1	3	2	92	83
3	(Iran) Amir Jabbari	0	2	0	2	0	4	49	84

Date		Score		Set 1	Set 2	Set 3
April 23; 10:00	Cheam June Wei (Malaysia)	2–0	(Iran) Amir Jabbari	21–13	21–14	
April 23; 11:20	Niluka Karunaratne (Sri Lanka)	2–0	(Iran) Amir Jabbari	21–10	21–12	
April 23; 12:40	Cheam June Wei (Malaysia)	2–1	(Sri Lanka) Niluka Karunaratne	21–11	19–21	21–18

==== Group C ====
Rank	Player	Pts	Pld	W	L	SF	SA	PF	PA
1	(Hong Kong) Hu Yun	1	1	1	0	2	0	42	24
2	(Mongolia) Batdavaa Munkhbat	0	1	0	1	0	2	24	42
	(Jordan) Bahaedeen Ahmad Alshannik	Withdrawn							

Date		Score		Set 1	Set 2	Set 3
April 23; 12:00	Batdavaa Munkhbat (Mongolia)	0–2	(Hong Kong) Hu Yun	11–21	13–21	

===== Group D =====
Rank	Player	Pts	Pld	W	L	SF	SA	PF	PA
1	(Macau) Pui Pang Fong	2	2	2	0	4	0	84	36
2	(Brunei) Jaspar Yu Woon Chai	1	2	1	1	2	2	58	73
3	(Uzbekistan) Artyom Savatyugin	0	2	0	2	0	4	84	51

Date		Score		Set 1	Set 2	Set 3
April 23; 10:00	Artyom Savatyugin (Uzbekistan)	0–2	(Macau) Pui Pang Fong	12–21	8–21	
April 23; 11:20	Jaspar Yu Woon Chai (Brunei)	2–0	(Uzbekistan) Artyom Savatyugin	21–16	21–15	
April 23; 12:40	Jaspar Yu Woon Chai (Brunei)	0–2	(Macau) Pui Pang Fong	6–21	10–21	

==== Women's singles ====
===== Group A =====
Rank	Player	Pts	Pld	W	L	SF	SA	PF	PA
1	(Macau) Ng Weng Chi	0	0	0	0	0	0	0	0
	(Singapore) Jaslyn Hooi Yue Yann	Withdrawn							

===== Group B =====
Rank	Player	Pts	Pld	W	L	SF	SA	PF	PA
1	(Hong Kong) Yeung Sum Yee	0	0	0	0	0	0	0	0
	(Jordan) Domou Amro	Withdrawn							

===== Group C =====
Rank	Player	Pts	Pld	W	L	SF	SA	PF	PA
1	(Sri Lanka) Kavidi Sirimannage	1	1	1	0	2	0	42	28
2	(Uzbekistan) Sevinch Sodikova	0	1	0	1	0	2	28	42

Date		Score		Set 1	Set 2	Set 3
April 23; 10:00	Sevinch Sodikova (Uzbekistan)	0–2	(Sri Lanka) Kavidi Sirimannage	13–21	15–21	

===== Group D =====
Rank	Player	Pts	Pld	W	L	SF	SA	PF	PA
1	(Hong Kong) Cheung Ying Mei	1	1	1	0	2	0	42	18
2	(Iran) Sorayya Aghaei	0	1	0	1	0	2	18	42
	(Nepal) Nangsal Tamang	Withdrawn							

Date		Score		Set 1	Set 2	Set 3
April 23; 10:40	Cheung Ying Mei (Hong Kong)	2–0	(Iran) Sorayya Aghaei	21–11	21–7	

==== Men's doubles ====
===== Group C =====
Rank	Player	Pts	Pld	W	L	SF	SA	PF	PA
1	(Hong Kong) Chang Tak Ching (Hong Kong) Yeung Ming Nok	1	1	1	0	2	0	42	19
2	(Uzbekistan) Amrullo Bakhshullaev (Uzbekistan) Artyom Savatyugin	0	1	0	1	0	2	19	42
	(Mongolia) Sumiyasuren Enkhbat (Mongolia) Temuulen Gombodorj	Withdrawn							

Date		Score		Set 1	Set 2	Set 3
April 23; 12:40	Chang Tak Ching (Hong Kong); Yeung Ming Nok (Hong Kong)	2–0	(Uzbekistan) Amrullo Bakhshullaev (Uzbekistan) Artyom Savatyugin	21–7	21–12	

== Men's singles ==
=== Seeds ===
1. (Japan) Kento Momota (champion)
2. (China) Shi Yuqi (final)
3. (Chinese Taipei) Chou Tien-chen (semifinals)
4. (China) Chen Long (quarterfinals)
5. (India) Srikanth Kidambi (first round)
6. (Indonesia) Anthony Sinisuka Ginting (first round)
7. (Indonesia) Tommy Sugiarto (second round)
8. (Indonesia) Jonatan Christie (first round)

=== Finals ===
Semifinals
1	(Japan) Kento Momota	21	21
(Vietnam) Nguyễn Tiến Minh	18	8
3	(Chinese Taipei) Chou Tien-chen	20	18
2	(China) Shi Yuqi	22	21

Final
1	(Japan) Kento Momota	12	21	21
2	(China) Shi Yuqi	21	18	8

=== Top half ===
==== Section 1 ====
First Round
1	(Japan) K Momota	21	21
(South Korea) Lee D-k	18	17
(Hong Kong) Lee C Y	21	21
(Chinese Taipei) Wang T-w	19	16
7	(Indonesia) T Sugiarto	21	21
C1	(Hong Kong) Hu Y	12	6
(Thailand) K Phetpradab	15	16
(China) Lu GZ	21	21

Second Round
1	(Japan) K Momota	21	21
(Hong Kong) Lee C Y	10	11
7	(Indonesia) T Sugiarto	18	19
(China) Lu GZ	21	21

Quarterfinals
1	(Japan) K Momota	16	21	21
(China) Lu GZ	21	11	14

==== Section 2 ====
First Round
4	(China) Chen L	21	21
(Japan) K Tsuneyama	19	13
(Malaysia) Chong W F	14	21	21
(Thailand) S Avihingsanon	21	13	15
5	(India) S Kidambi	16	20
(Indonesia) S H Rhustavito	21	22
(Vietnam) Nguyễn T M	21	21	21
D1	(Macau) Pui P F	23	11	9

Second Round
4	(China) Chen L	21	21
(Malaysia) Chong W F	16	7
(Indonesia) S H Rhustavito	15	21	13
(Vietnam) Nguyễn T M	21	13	21

Quarterfinals
4	(China) Chen L
(Vietnam) Nguyễn T M	w	/	o

=== Bottom half ===
==== Section 3 ====
First Round
(Hong Kong) Wong W K	21	21
A1	(Nepal) R Tamang	9	13
(Japan) K Nishimoto	18	21	21
8	(Indonesia) J Christie	21	19	10
PFQ	(Chinese Taipei) Lu C-h	11	17
(China) Lin D	21	21
(Thailand) K Wangcharoen	21	21	16
3	(Chinese Taipei) Chou T-c	23	17	21

Second Round
(Hong Kong) Wong W K	16	13
(Japan) K Nishimoto	21	21
(China) Lin D	10	10
3	(Chinese Taipei) Chou T-c	21	21

Quarterfinals
(Japan) K Nishimoto	20	26	15
3	(Chinese Taipei) Chou T-c	22	24	21

==== Section 4 ====
First Round
(India) S Verma	21	17	21
(Japan) K Sakai	13	21	18
(Hong Kong) Ng K L	21	18	25
6	(Indonesia) A S Ginting	18	21	23
B1	(Malaysia) Cheam J W	21	19	16
(Thailand) S Thammasin	14	21	21
(Singapore) Loh K Y	12	13
2	(China) Shi YQ	21	21

Second Round
(India) S Verma	21	21
(Hong Kong) Ng K L	12	19
(Thailand) S Thammasin	20	9
2	(China) Shi YQ	22	21

Quarterfinals
(India) S Verma	10	12
2	(China) Shi YQ	21	21

== Women's singles ==
=== Seeds ===
1. (China) Chen Yufei (semifinals)
2. (Japan) Nozomi Okuhara (quarterfinals)
3. (Japan) Akane Yamaguchi (champion)
4. (India) P. V. Sindhu (quarterfinals)
5. (China) He Bingjiao (final)
6. (Thailand) Ratchanok Intanon (withdrew)
7. (India) Saina Nehwal (quarterfinals)
8. (South Korea) Sung Ji-hyun (first round)

=== Finals ===
Semifinals
1	(China) Chen Yufei	21	16	17
3	(Japan) Akane Yamaguchi	15	21	21
(China) Cai Yanyan	21	12	17
5	(China) He Bingjiao	8	21	21

Final
3	(Japan) Akane Yamaguchi	21	21
5	(China) He Bingjiao	19	9

=== Top half ===
==== Section 1 ====
First Round
1	(China) Chen YF	21	21
PFQ	(Vietnam) Vũ T T	8	12
D1	(Hong Kong) Cheung Y M	18	16
(Indonesia) G M Tunjung	21	21
PFQ	(Myanmar) Thet Htar T	7	12
(Japan) A Ohori	21	21
(Chinese Taipei) Pai Y-p	12	16
(Hong Kong) Cheung N Y	21	21

Second Round
1	(China) Chen YF	15	21	21
(Indonesia) G M Tunjung	21	14	15
(Japan) A Ohori	19	21	21
(Hong Kong) Cheung N Y	21	11	16

Quarterfinals
1	(China) Chen YF	21	21
(Japan) A Ohori	17	19

==== Section 2 ====
First Round
3	(Japan) A Yamaguchi	21	21
C1	(Sri Lanka) K Sirimannage	7	19
(Singapore) Yeo J M	21	21
(Thailand) B Ongbamrungphan	15	13
7	(India) S Nehwal	12	21	21
(China) Han Y	21	11	17
(South Korea) Kim G-e	21	21
(Indonesia) R Hartawan	12	19

Second Round
3	(Japan) A Yamaguchi	21	8	21
(Singapore) Yeo J M	18	21	17
7	(India) S Nehwal	21	21
(South Korea) Kim G-e	13	13

Quarterfinals
3	(Japan) A Yamaguchi	21	21	21
7	(India) S Nehwal	13	23	16

=== Bottom half ===
==== Section 3 ====
First Round
(Hong Kong) Yip P Y	21	21
A1	(Macau) Ng W C	14	6
(China) Cai YY	21	16	21
8	(South Korea) Sung J-h	15	21	19
(Malaysia) Lee Y Y	17	15
PFQ	(Indonesia) Choirunnisa	21	21
(Japan) S Takahashi	14	7
4	(India) P. V. Sindhu	21	21

Second Round
(Hong Kong) Yip P Y	9	15
(China) Cai YY	21	21
PFQ	(Indonesia) Choirunnisa	15	19
4	(India) P. V. Sindhu	21	21

Quarterfinals
(China) Cai YY	21	21
4	(India) P. V. Sindhu	19	9

==== Section 4 ====
First Round
B1	(Hong Kong) Yeung S Y	12	16
(Vietnam) Nguyễn T L	21	21
(Thailand) N Jindapol	16	12
5	(China) He BJ	21	21
(Malaysia) S Cheah S Y	21	21
(Indonesia) Fitriani	12	10
(South Korea) Kim H-m	12	17
2	(Japan) N Okuhara	21	21

Second Round
(Vietnam) Nguyễn T L	16	13
5	(China) He BJ	21	21
(Malaysia) S Cheah S Y	21	12	15
2	(Japan) N Okuhara	17	21	21

Quarterfinals
5	(China) He BJ	21	23
2	(Japan) N Okuhara	16	21

== Men's doubles ==
=== Seeds ===
1. (Indonesia) Marcus Fernaldi Gideon / Kevin Sanjaya Sukamuljo (final)
2. (China) Li Junhui / Liu Yuchen (quarterfinals)
3. (Japan) Takeshi Kamura / Keigo Sonoda (semifinals)
4. (Indonesia) Mohammad Ahsan / Hendra Setiawan (second round)
5. (Japan) Hiroyuki Endo / Yuta Watanabe (champions)
6. (China) Han Chengkai / Zhou Haodong (quarterfinals)
7. (Indonesia) Fajar Alfian / Muhammad Rian Ardianto (second round)
8. (China) Liu Cheng / Zhang Nan (second round)

=== Finals ===
Semifinals
1	(Indonesia) Marcus Fernaldi Gideon (Indonesia) Kevin Sanjaya Sukamuljo	15	21	21
3	(Japan) Takeshi Kamura (Japan) Keigo Sonoda	21	17	15
(South Korea) Kang Min-hyuk (South Korea) Kim Won-ho	17	22	25
5	(Japan) Hiroyuki Endo (Japan) Yuta Watanabe	21	20	27

Final
1	(Indonesia) Marcus Fernaldi Gideon (Indonesia) Kevin Sanjaya Sukamuljo	18	3
5	(Japan) Hiroyuki Endo (Japan) Yuta Watanabe	21	21

=== Top half ===
==== Section 1 ====
First Round
1	(Indonesia) M F Gideon (Indonesia) K S Sukamuljo	21	21
PFQ	(Singapore) D B Chrisnanta (Singapore) T Hee Y K	12	17
(Japan) T Hoki (Japan) Y Kobayashi	13^{r}
C1	(Hong Kong) Chang T C (Hong Kong) Yeung M N	20
6	(China) Han CK (China) Zhou HD	21	21
PFQ	(Nepal) D Dhami (Nepal) R Tamang	5	11
(Chinese Taipei) Lu C-y (Chinese Taipei) Yang P-h	21	11	21
(Malaysia) Goh V S (Malaysia) Tan W K	15	21	8

Second Round
1	(Indonesia) M F Gideon (Indonesia) K S Sukamuljo	21	21
C1	(Hong Kong) Chang T C (Hong Kong) Yeung M N	18	18
6	(China) Han CK (China) Zhou HD	21	21
(Chinese Taipei) Lu C-y (Chinese Taipei) Yang P-h	16	18

Quarterfinals
1	(Indonesia) M F Gideon (Indonesia) K S Sukamuljo	21	19	21
6	(China) Han CK (China) Zhou HD	13	21	16

==== Section 2 ====
First Round
3	(Japan) T Kamura (Japan) K Sonoda	21	21
(Hong Kong) Y Chung (Hong Kong) Tam C H	12	17
(Malaysia) M Arif A L (Malaysia) N M Azriyn A	21	21
(Thailand) I Apisuk (Thailand) T Viriyangkura	14	10
7	(Indonesia) F Alfian (Indonesia) M R Ardianto	21	21
A1	(Hong Kong) Lam W L (Hong Kong) Li K H	14	12
(India) Arjun M.R. (India) R Shlok	18	15
(China) He JT (China) Tan Q	21	21

Second Round
3	(Japan) T Kamura (Japan) K Sonoda	21	21
(Malaysia) M Arif A L (Malaysia) N M Azriyn A	16	18
7	(Indonesia) F Alfian (Indonesia) M R Ardianto	23	19	19
(China) He JT (China) Tan Q	21	21	21

Quarterfinals
3	(Japan) T Kamura (Japan) K Sonoda	21	18	21
(China) He JT (China) Tan Q	12	21	19

=== Bottom half ===
==== Section 3 ====
First Round
(South Korea) Kang M-h (South Korea) Kim W-h	21	21
B1	(Brunei) A M Haji Abas (Brunei) J Yu W C	7	7
(Japan) T Inoue (Japan) Y Kaneko	16	14
8	(China) Liu C (China) Zhang N	21	21
(Thailand) K Kedren (Thailand) D Puavaranukroh	15	21	17
(Malaysia) A Chia (Malaysia) Soh W Y	21	19	21
(Chinese Taipei) Liao M-c (Chinese Taipei) Su C-h	15	16
4	(Indonesia) M Ahsan (Indonesia) H Setiawan	21	21

Second Round
(South Korea) Kang M-h (South Korea) Kim W-h	21	12	21
8	(China) Liu C (China) Zhang N	13	21	12
(Malaysia) A Chia (Malaysia) Soh W Y	w	/	o
4	(Indonesia) M Ahsan (Indonesia) H Setiawan

Quarterfinals
(South Korea) Kang M-h (South Korea) Kim W-h	21	16	21
(Malaysia) A Chia (Malaysia) Soh W Y	15	21	18

==== Section 4 ====
First Round
PFQ	(Sri Lanka) D Karunaratne (Sri Lanka) N Karunaratne	19	12
(Indonesia) W Nayaka (Indonesia) A Yusuf	21	21
(Thailand) T Isriyanet (Thailand) K Namdash	12	15
5	(Japan) H Endo (Japan) Y Watanabe	21	21
(Chinese Taipei) Lin S-k (Chinese Taipei) Tseng M-h	12	12
(Malaysia) Ong Y S (Malaysia) Teo E Y	21	21
D1	(Hong Kong) Chan T K (Hong Kong) Yeung S C	16	13
2	(China) Li JH (China) Liu YC	21	21

Second Round
(Indonesia) W Nayaka (Indonesia) A Yusuf	11	6
5	(Japan) H Endo (Japan) Y Watanabe	21	21
(Malaysia) Ong Y S (Malaysia) Teo E Y	23	22	14
2	(China) Li JH (China) Liu YC	21	24	21

Quarterfinals
5	(Japan) H Endo (Japan) Y Watanabe	21	21
2	(China) Li JH (China) Liu YC	19	18

== Women's doubles ==
=== Seeds ===
1. (Japan) Yuki Fukushima / Sayaka Hirota (semifinals)
2. (Japan) Misaki Matsutomo / Ayaka Takahashi (first round)
3. (Japan) Mayu Matsumoto / Wakana Nagahara (final)
4. (China) Chen Qingchen / Jia Yifan (champions)

=== Finals ===
Semifinals
1	(Japan) Yuki Fukushima (Japan) Sayaka Hirota	16	24
3	(Japan) Mayu Matsumoto (Japan) Wakana Nagahara	21	26
4	(China) Chen Qingchen (China) Jia Yifan	22	21
(Indonesia) Della Destiara Haris (Indonesia) Rizki Amelia Pradipta	20	12

Final
3	(Japan) Mayu Matsumoto (Japan) Wakana Nagahara	21	14	19
4	(China) Chen Qingchen (China) Jia Yifan	19	21	21

=== Top half ===
==== Section 1 ====
First Round
(China) Du Y (China) Li YH	21	21
(Macau) Gong X X (Macau) Ng W C	9	10
(Thailand) J Kititharakul (Thailand) R Prajongjai	21	21
(India) M Jakkampudi (India) P S. Ram	13	16
(Malaysia) A Cheong C Y (Malaysia) Lim C S	21	21
(Indonesia) Y Barkah (Indonesia) J F Sugiarto	10	17

Second Round
1	(Japan) Y Fukushima (Japan) S Hirota	21	21
(China) Du Y (China) Li YH	16	11
(Thailand) J Kititharakul (Thailand) R Prajongjai	21	21
(Malaysia) A Cheong C Y (Malaysia) Lim C S	15	18

Quarterfinals
1	(Japan) Y Fukushima (Japan) S Hirota	3
(Thailand) J Kititharakul (Thailand) R Prajongjai	2^{r}

==== Section 2 ====
First Round
3	(Japan) M Matsumoto (Japan) W Nagahara	21	21
(Uzbekistan) G Bokieva (Uzbekistan) S Sodikova	2	6
(Singapore) Jin YJ (Singapore) Lim M H	21	21
(India) A Balan (India) Sruthi K.P	12	10
(Indonesia) G Polii (Indonesia) A Rahayu	12	17
(China) Li WM (China) Zheng Y	21	21
(Hong Kong) Ng T Y (Hong Kong) Yuen S Y	9	10
(South Korea) Kim S-y (South Korea) Kong H-y	21	21

Second Round
3	(Japan) M Matsumoto (Japan) W Nagahara	21	21
(Singapore) Jin YJ (Singapore) Lim M H	7	11
(China) Li WM (China) Zheng Y	24	21
(South Korea) Kim S-y (South Korea) Kong H-y	22	16

Quarterfinals
3	(Japan) M Matsumoto (Japan) W Nagahara	22	21
(China) Li WM (China) Zheng Y	20	19

=== Bottom half ===
==== Section 3 ====
First Round
(Hong Kong) Ng W Y (Hong Kong) Yeung N T	17	19
(South Korea) Lee S-h (South Korea) Shin S-c	21	21
(Japan) S Tanaka (Japan) K Yonemoto
(Malaysia) V Hoo K M (Malaysia) Yap C W	w	/	o
(Thailand) P Supajirakul (Thailand) S Taerattanachai	21	21
(Indonesia) A Imanuela (Indonesia) S F S Ramadhanti	11	12
(Nepal) A Giri (Nepal) R Maharjan
4	(China) Chen QC (China) Jia YF	w	/	o

Second Round
(South Korea) Lee S-h (South Korea) Shin S-c	21	21
(Malaysia) V Hoo K M (Malaysia) Yap C W	12	8
(Thailand) P Supajirakul (Thailand) S Taerattanachai	18	21	13
4	(China) Chen QC (China) Jia YF	21	15	21

Quarterfinals
(South Korea) Lee S-h (South Korea) Shin S-c	21	16	13
4	(China) Chen QC (China) Jia YF	18	21	21

==== Section 4 ====
First Round
(Chinese Taipei) Chang C-h (Chinese Taipei) Yang C-t	21	21	22
(Hong Kong) Ng S Y (Hong Kong) Wu Y T	23	14	20
(Sri Lanka) T P Hendahewa (Sri Lanka) K Sirimannage	21	12	21
(India) P Dandu (India) S Santosh	13	21	12
(Thailand) C Chaladchalam (Thailand) P Meunwong
(Indonesia) D D Haris (Indonesia) R A Pradipta	w	/	o
(China) Dong WJ (China) Feng XY	21	21
2	(Japan) M Matsutomo (Japan) A Takahashi	18	19

Second Round
(Chinese Taipei) Chang C-h (Chinese Taipei) Yang C-t	21	24
(Sri Lanka) T P Hendahewa (Sri Lanka) K Sirimannage	18	22
(Indonesia) D D Haris (Indonesia) R A Pradipta	21	21
(China) Dong WJ (China) Feng XY	18	16

Quarterfinals
(Chinese Taipei) Chang C-h (Chinese Taipei) Yang C-t	12	18
(Indonesia) D D Haris (Indonesia) R A Pradipta	21	21

== Mixed doubles ==
=== Seeds ===
1. (China) Zheng Siwei / Huang Yaqiong (semifinals)
2. (China) Wang Yilü / Huang Dongping (champions)
3. (Japan) Yuta Watanabe / Arisa Higashino (quarterfinals)
4. (Thailand) Dechapol Puavaranukroh / Sapsiree Taerattanachai (semifinals)
5. (Malaysia) Chan Peng Soon / Goh Liu Ying (second round)
6. (South Korea) Seo Seung-jae / Chae Yoo-jung (withdrew)
7. (Hong Kong) Tang Chun Man / Tse Ying Suet (first round)
8. (Malaysia) Goh Soon Huat / Shevon Jemie Lai (withdrew)

=== Finals ===
Semifinals
1	(China) Zheng Siwei (China) Huang Yaqiong	14	18
(China) He Jiting (China) Du Yue	21	21
4	(Thailand) Dechapol Puavaranukroh (Thailand) Sapsiree Taerattanachai	21	10
2	(China) Wang Yilü (China) Huang Dongping	23	21

Final
(China) He Jiting (China) Du Yue	11	21	21
2	(China) Wang Yilü (China) Huang Dongping	21	13	23

=== Top half ===
==== Section 1 ====
First Round
1	(China) Zheng SW (China) Huang YQ	21	14	21
(Malaysia) Tan K M (Malaysia) Lai P J	12	21	15
PFQ	(Uzbekistan) A Bakhshullaev (Uzbekistan) S Sodikova	w	/	o
A1
7	(Hong Kong) Tang C M (Hong Kong) Tse Y S	19	17
(Japan) Y Kaneko (Japan) M Matsutomo	21	21
(India) R Kapoor (India) K Garg	5	15
(Indonesia) P Jordan (Indonesia) M D Oktavianti	21	21

Second Round
1	(China) Zheng SW (China) Huang YQ	21	21
PFQ	(Uzbekistan) A Bakhshullaev (Uzbekistan) S Sodikova	6	6
(Japan) Y Kaneko (Japan) M Matsutomo	21	21
(Indonesia) P Jordan (Indonesia) M D Oktavianti	18	14

Quarterfinals
1	(China) Zheng SW (China) Huang YQ	22	21
(Japan) Y Kaneko (Japan) M Matsutomo	20	10

==== Section 2 ====
First Round
3	(Japan) Y Watanabe (Japan) A Higashino	21	22
(Thailand) N Phuangphuapet (Thailand) S Amitrapai	19	20
(Indonesia) R Rivaldy (Indonesia) P H Mentari	21	21
(Vietnam) Đỗ T Đ (Vietnam) Phạm N T	11	14
5	(Malaysia) Chan P S (Malaysia) Goh L Y	13	22	21
(Singapore) D B Chrisnanta (Singapore) Tan W H	21	20	18
B1
(China) He JT (China) Du Y	w	/	o

Second Round
3	(Japan) Y Watanabe (Japan) A Higashino	21	17	21
(Indonesia) R Rivaldy (Indonesia) P H Mentari	15	21	17
5	(Malaysia) Chan P S (Malaysia) Goh L Y	21	21	15
(China) He JT (China) Du Y	23	14	21

Quarterfinals
3	(Japan) Y Watanabe (Japan) A Higashino	13	0^{r}
(China) He JT (China) Du Y	21	1

=== Bottom half ===
==== Section 3 ====
First Round
(China) Zhang N (China) Li YH	11	21	23
(Indonesia) H Faizal (Indonesia) G E Widjaja	21	19	25
C1
PFQ	(India) U Arora (India) K Wadkar	w	/	o
(Hong Kong) Chang T C (Hong Kong) Ng W Y	19	21	18
(Japan) T Hoki (Japan) W Nagahara	21	13	21
(India) S Sharma (India) A Parikh	9	9
4	(Thailand) D Puavaranukroh (Thailand) S Taerattanachai	21	21

Second Round
(Indonesia) H Faizal (Indonesia) G E Widjaja	21	21
PFQ	(India) U Arora (India) K Wadkar	10	15
(Japan) T Hoki (Japan) W Nagahara	24	16	17
4	(Thailand) D Puavaranukroh (Thailand) S Taerattanachai	22	21	21

Quarterfinals
(Indonesia) H Faizal (Indonesia) G E Widjaja	21	7	12
4	(Thailand) D Puavaranukroh (Thailand) S Taerattanachai	15	21	21

==== Section 4 ====
First Round
(Hong Kong) Yeung M N (Hong Kong) Ng T Y	21	21
(Malaysia) Chen T J (Malaysia) Peck Y W	15	17
(Japan) K Gondo (Japan) A Kurihara	21	21
PFQ	(Sri Lanka) S Dias (Sri Lanka) T P Hendahewa	15	18
D1
(India) V G Prasad (India) J Dewangan	w	/	o
(Indonesia) A E Prasetya (Indonesia) M G Islami	22	18	17
2	(China) Wang YL (China) Huang DP	20	21	21

Second Round
(Hong Kong) Yeung M N (Hong Kong) Ng T Y	22	21
(Japan) K Gondo (Japan) A Kurihara	20	17
(India) V G Prasad (India) J Dewangan	10	9
2	(China) Wang YL (China) Huang DP	21	21

Quarterfinals
(Hong Kong) Yeung M N (Hong Kong) Ng T Y	14	9
2	(China) Wang YL (China) Huang DP	21	21
