= 2019 Thailand Masters (badminton) =

Badminton tournament in Bangkok

Tournament details
- Dates: 8–13 January
- Edition: 4th
- Level: Super 300
- Total prize money: US$150,000
- Venue: Indoor Stadium Huamark
- Location: Bangkok, Thailand

Champions
- Men's singles: (Singapore) Loh Kean Yew
- Women's singles: (Indonesia) Fitriani
- Men's doubles: (Malaysia) Goh V Shem (Malaysia) Tan Wee Kiong
- Women's doubles: (Thailand) Puttita Supajirakul (Thailand) Sapsiree Taerattanachai
- Mixed doubles: (Malaysia) Chan Peng Soon (Malaysia) Goh Liu Ying

The 2019 Thailand Masters (officially known as the Princess Sirivannavari Thailand Masters 2019 presented by Toyota for sponsorship reasons) was a badminton tournament which took place at Indoor Stadium Huamark in Thailand from 8 to 13 January 2019 and had a total purse of $150,000.

== Tournament ==
The 2019 Thailand Masters was the first tournament of the 2019 BWF World Tour and also part of the Thailand Masters championships which had been held since 2016. This tournament was organized by the Badminton Association of Thailand with sanction from the BWF.

=== Venue ===
This international tournament was held at Indoor Stadium Huamark in Bangkok, Thailand.

=== Point distribution ===
Below is the point distribution table for each phase of the tournament based on the BWF points system for the BWF World Tour Super 300 event.

Winner	Runner-up	3/4	5/8	9/16	17/32	33/64	65/128
7,000	5,950	4,900	3,850	2,750	1,670	660	320

=== Prize money ===
The total prize money for this tournament was US$150,000. Distribution of prize money was in accordance with BWF regulations.

Event	Winner	Finals	Semi-finals	Quarter-finals	Last 16
Singles	$11,250	$5,700	$2,175	$900	$525
Doubles	$11,850	$5,700	$2,100	$1,087.50	$562.50

== Men's singles ==
=== Seeds ===
1. (China) Lin Dan (final)
2. (Thailand) Khosit Phetpradab (first round)
3. (Thailand) Kantaphon Wangcharoen (first round)
4. (Thailand) Suppanyu Avihingsanon (first round)
5. (Denmark) Jan Ø. Jørgensen (withdrew)
6. (Chinese Taipei) Wang Tzu-wei (quarter-finals)
7. (France) Brice Leverdez (semi-finals)
8. (China) Lu Guangzu (semi-finals)

=== Finals ===
Semi-finals
1	(China) Lin Dan	21	6	21
8	(China) Lu Guangzu	11	21	18
7	(France) Brice Leverdez	21	10	14
Q2	(Singapore) Loh Kean Yew	14	21	21

Final
1	(China) Lin Dan	19	18
Q2	(Singapore) Loh Kean Yew	21	21

=== Top half ===
==== Section 1 ====
First Round
1	(China) Lin D	21	11	21
Q4	(Thailand) K Vitidsarn	14	21	12
(Hong Kong) Lee C Y	13	21	21
(Russia) V Malkov	21	15	4
PFQ	(Malaysia) Cheam J W	21	11	21
(Indonesia) I M Mustofa	18	21	15
(France) T Rouxel	21	18	8
Q1	(Thailand) P Thongnuam	17	21	21

Second Round
1	(China) Lin D	21	15	22
(Hong Kong) Lee C Y	19	21	20
PFQ	(Malaysia) Cheam J W	14	21	21
Q1	(Thailand) P Thongnuam	21	17	16

Quarter-finals
1	(China) Lin D	14	21	21
PFQ	(Malaysia) Cheam J W	21	16	8

==== Section 2 ====
First Round
3	(Thailand) K Wangcharoen	17	21
(Thailand) S Thammasin	21	23
(Japan) Y Igarashi	17	21	19
(Indonesia) F A Kholik	21	17	21
8	(China) Lu GZ	21	21
(Indonesia) C A Dwi Wardoyo	17	8
(Malaysia) Soong J V	21	18	13
Q3	(Japan) K Watanabe	12	21	21

Second Round
(Thailand) S Thammasin	16	20
(Indonesia) F A Kholik	21	22
8	(China) Lu GZ	23	21
Q3	(Japan) K Watanabe	21	17

Quarter-finals
(Indonesia) F A Kholik	15	17
8	(China) Lu GZ	21	21

=== Bottom half ===
==== Section 3 ====
First Round
(Israel) M Zilberman	19	12
(India) S Dey	21	21
(Brazil) Y Coelho	19	16
7	(France) B Leverdez	21	21
(Indonesia) S D Kuncoro	17	11
(Malaysia) Lee Z J	21	21
(Hong Kong) Wong W K	21	21
4	(Thailand) S Avihingsanon	18	17

Second Round
(India) S Dey	19	10
7	(France) B Leverdez	21	21
(Malaysia) Lee Z J	11	21	21
(Hong Kong) Wong W K	21	19	15

Quarter-finals
7	(France) B Leverdez	21	21
(Malaysia) Lee Z J	11	19

==== Section 4 ====
First Round
(France) L Corvée	5
PFQ	(Vietnam) Phạm C C	1^{r}
(France) L Claerbout	7	12
6	(Chinese Taipei) Wang T-w	21	21
Q2	(Singapore) Loh K Y	21	21
(China) Zhou ZQ	13	17
(China) Zhao JP	21	16	21
2	(Thailand) K Phetpradab	18	21	18

Second Round
(France) L Corvée	17	21	15
6	(Chinese Taipei) Wang T-w	21	13	21
Q2	(Singapore) Loh K Y	21	21
(China) Zhao JP	10	19

Quarter-finals
6	(Chinese Taipei) Wang T-w	19	22	11
Q2	(Singapore) Loh K Y	21	20	21

== Women's singles ==
=== Seeds ===
1. (Thailand) Nitchaon Jindapol (second round)
2. (China) Gao Fangjie (withdrew)
3. (Canada) Michelle Li (quarter-finals)
4. (China) Cai Yanyan (second round)
5. (Denmark) Line Kjærsfeldt (withdrew)
6. (Thailand) Pornpawee Chochuwong (semi-finals)
7. (Hong Kong) Cheung Ngan Yi (second round)
8. (Thailand) Busanan Ongbamrungphan (final)

=== Finals ===
Semi-finals
(Indonesia) Fitriani	12	21	21
(Hong Kong) Deng Xuan	21	19	16
8	(Thailand) Busanan Ongbamrungphan	21	21
6	(Thailand) Pornpawee Chochuwong	10	4

Final
(Indonesia) Fitriani	21	21
8	(Thailand) Busanan Ongbamrungphan	12	14

=== Top half ===
==== Section 1 ====
First Round
1	(Thailand) N Jindapol	21	21
Q4	(Chinese Taipei) Lin Y-c	12	15
(Indonesia) Fitriani	18	21	23
(Malaysia) Lee Y Y	21	9	21
PFQ	(Thailand) P Chaiwan	9	16
(Singapore) Yeo J M	21	21
(Denmark) J D Jakobsen	15	13
(Germany) Y Li	21	21

Second Round
1	(Thailand) N Jindapol	10	21	16
(Indonesia) Fitriani	21	17	21
(Singapore) Yeo J M	21	21
(Germany) Y Li	6	18

Quarter-finals
(Indonesia) Fitriani	14	21	21
(Singapore) Yeo J M	21	15	18

==== Section 2 ====
First Round
3	(Canada) M Li	21	22
(Hong Kong) Yip P Y	15	20
(Switzerland) S Jaquet	19	13
(Japan) A Mine	21	21
7	(Hong Kong) Cheung N Y	21	21
Q1	(China) Ji ST	18	8
PFQ	(India) S K P Kudaravalli	7	14
(Hong Kong) Deng X	21	21

Second Round
3	(Canada) M Li	21	13	21
(Japan) A Mine	6	21	10
7	(Hong Kong) Cheung N Y	21	13	20
(Hong Kong) Deng X	12	21	22

Quarter-finals
3	(Canada) M Li	13	19
(Hong Kong) Deng X	21	21

=== Bottom half ===
==== Section 3 ====
First Round
(Indonesia) R Hartawan	21	22	21
(Chinese Taipei) Chiang Y-l	15	24	17
(Israel) K Polikarpova	12	8
8	(Thailand) B Ongbamrungphan	21	21
(India) V R Jakka	9	13
(Japan) S Kawakami	21	21
(Chinese Taipei) Pai Y-p	14	12
4	(China) Cai YY	21	21

Second Round
(Indonesia) R Hartawan	14	9
8	(Thailand) B Ongbamrungphan	21	21
(Japan) S Kawakami	21	21
4	(China) Cai YY	17	17

Quarter-finals
8	(Thailand) B Ongbamrungphan	21	10	21
(Japan) S Kawakami	17	21	13

==== Section 4 ====
First Round
Q2	(Belgium) L Tan	21	21
(Indonesia) L A Mainaky	13	11
Q3	(Malaysia) Lim Y F	14	4
6	(Thailand) P Chochuwong	21	21
(Indonesia) Y Y Susanto	21	21
(Thailand) C Jucharoen	17	18
(Canada) B Tam	9	19
PFQ	(Thailand) P Buranaprasertsuk	21	21

Second Round
Q2	(Belgium) L Tan	18	9
6	(Thailand) P Chochuwong	21	21
(Indonesia) Y Y Susanto	21	5	18
PFQ	(Thailand) P Buranaprasertsuk	19	21	21

Quarter-finals
6	(Thailand) P Chochuwong	21	21
PFQ	(Thailand) P Buranaprasertsuk	15	12

== Men's doubles ==
=== Seeds ===
1. (Malaysia) Goh V Shem / Tan Wee Kiong (champions)
2. (Malaysia) Aaron Chia / Soh Wooi Yik (second round)
3. (China) Ou Xuanyi / Ren Xiangyu (withdrew)
4. (Indonesia) Wahyu Nayaka / Ade Yusuf Santoso (second round)
5. (Chinese Taipei) Lu Ching-yao / Yang Po-han (final)
6. (Malaysia) Ong Yew Sin / Teo Ee Yi (quarter-finals)
7. (Netherlands) Jelle Maas / Robin Tabeling (second round)
8. (Malaysia) Mohamad Arif Abdul Latif / Nur Mohd Azriyn Ayub (quarter-finals)

=== Finals ===
Semi-finals
1	(Malaysia) Goh V Shem (Malaysia) Tan Wee Kiong	21	21
(Japan) Akira Koga (Japan) Taichi Saito	12	10
(Malaysia) Goh Sze Fei (Malaysia) Nur Izzuddin	21	13	11
5	(Chinese Taipei) Lu Ching-yao (Chinese Taipei) Yang Po-han	17	21	21

Final
1	(Malaysia) Goh V Shem (Malaysia) Tan Wee Kiong	21	21
5	(Chinese Taipei) Lu Ching-yao (Chinese Taipei) Yang Po-han	13	17

=== Top half ===
==== Section 1 ====
First Round
1	(Malaysia) Goh V S (Malaysia) Tan W K	21	21
(Thailand) K Kedren (Thailand) D Puavaranukroh	13	15
(Japan) M Takano (Japan) Y Tsukamoto	21	21
(England) B Lane (England) S Vendy	19	16
6	(Malaysia) Ong Y S (Malaysia) Teo E Y	21	21
Q2	(Vietnam) Đỗ T Đ (Vietnam) Phạm H N	10	7
Q3	(India) T Kona (Malaysia) Lim K W	11	12
(Thailand) T Isriyanet (Thailand) N Phuangphuapet	21	21

Second Round
1	(Malaysia) Goh V S (Malaysia) Tan W K	21	21
(Japan) M Takano (Japan) Y Tsukamoto	17	13
6	(Malaysia) Ong Y S (Malaysia) Teo E Y	21	21
(Thailand) T Isriyanet (Thailand) N Phuangphuapet	14	14

Quarter-finals
1	(Malaysia) Goh V S (Malaysia) Tan W K	21	21
6	(Malaysia) Ong Y S (Malaysia) Teo E Y	12	16

==== Section 2 ====
First Round
4	(Indonesia) W Nayaka (Indonesia) A Y Santoso	23	21
(Thailand) P Kuna-Anuvit (Thailand) N Trinkajee	21	17
(Hong Kong) Mak H C (Hong Kong) Tang C M	12	7^{r}
(Japan) A Koga (Japan) T Saito	21	11
7	(Netherlands) J Maas (Netherlands) R Tabeling	18	21	26
Q1	(China) Liang WK (China) Shang YC	21	13	24
(Hong Kong) Y Chung (Hong Kong) Tam C H	20	17
(China) Di ZJ (China) Wang C	22	21

Second Round
4	(Indonesia) W Nayaka (Indonesia) A Y Santoso	17	12
(Japan) A Koga (Japan) T Saito	21	21
7	(Netherlands) J Maas (Netherlands) R Tabeling	19	10
(China) Di ZJ (China) Wang C	21	21

Quarter-finals
(Japan) A Koga (Japan) T Saito	16	21	21
(China) Di ZJ (China) Wang C	21	12	7

=== Bottom half ===
==== Section 3 ====
First Round
(Japan) H Okamura (Japan) M Onodera	21	21
PFQ	(Chinese Taipei) Kan C-y (Chinese Taipei) Liao C-h	15	10
(Chinese Taipei) Lee J-h (Chinese Taipei) Yang P-hs	24	22	18
8	(Malaysia) M Arif A L (Malaysia) N M Azriyn A	26	20	21
(Japan) M Kaneko (Japan) Y Kubota	10	15
Q4	(Chinese Taipei) Lin C-y (Chinese Taipei) Yang M-t	21	21
(Malaysia) Goh S F (Malaysia) N Izzudin	21	19	21
PFQ	(Indonesia) M S Fikri (Indonesia) B Maulana	11	21	14

Second Round
(Japan) H Okamura (Japan) M Onodera	21	14	16
8	(Malaysia) M Arif A L (Malaysia) N M Azriyn A	19	21	21
Q4	(Chinese Taipei) Lin C-y (Chinese Taipei) Yang M-t	15	17
(Malaysia) Goh S F (Malaysia) N Izzudin	21	21

Quarter-finals
8	(Malaysia) M Arif A L (Malaysia) N M Azriyn A	8	14
(Malaysia) Goh S F (Malaysia) N Izzudin	21	21

==== Section 4 ====
First Round
(Indonesia) S K Gutama (Indonesia) F W Putra	21	21
(Indonesia) A B Cahyono (Indonesia) M R P Isfahani	18	17
(Thailand) I Apisuk (Thailand) T Viriyangkura	11	17
5	(Chinese Taipei) Lu C-y (Chinese Taipei) Yang P-ha	21	21
(France) T Gicquel (France) R Labar	21	21	22
(Japan) K Matsui (Japan) Y Takeuchi	23	11	24
(Malaysia) Chooi K M (Malaysia) Low J S	21	19	15
2	(Malaysia) A Chia (Malaysia) Soh W Y	17	21	21

Second Round
(Indonesia) S K Gutama (Indonesia) F W Putra	11	21	16
5	(Chinese Taipei) Lu C-y (Chinese Taipei) Yang P-ha	21	17	21
(Japan) K Matsui (Japan) Y Takeuchi	28	21
2	(Malaysia) A Chia (Malaysia) Soh W Y	26	16

Quarter-finals
5	(Chinese Taipei) Lu C-y (Chinese Taipei) Yang P-ha	16	21	21
(Japan) K Matsui (Japan) Y Takeuchi	21	12	14

== Women's doubles ==
=== Seeds ===
1. (Thailand) Jongkolphan Kititharakul / Rawinda Prajongjai (quarter-finals)
2. (Japan) Nami Matsuyama / Chiharu Shida (quarter-finals)
3. (Thailand) Chayanit Chaladchalam / Phataimas Muenwong (quarter-finals)
4. (France) Émilie Lefel / Anne Tran (second round)
5. (China) Li Wenmei / Zheng Yu (final)
6. (Netherlands) Selena Piek / Cheryl Seinen (semi-finals)
7. (Russia) Ekaterina Bolotova / Alina Davletova (semi-finals)
8. (Australia) Gronya Somerville / Setyana Mapasa (withdrew)

=== Finals ===
Semi-finals
(Thailand) Puttita Supajirakul (Thailand) Sapsiree Taerattanachai	18	21	21
7	(Russia) Ekaterina Bolotova (Russia) Alina Davletova	21	12	4
6	(Netherlands) Selena Piek (Netherlands) Cheryl Seinen	18	16
5	(China) Li Wenmei (China) Zheng Yu	21	21

Final
(Thailand) Puttita Supajirakul (Thailand) Sapsiree Taerattanachai	15	21	21
5	(China) Li Wenmei (China) Zheng Yu	21	15	10

=== Top half ===
==== Section 1 ====
First Round
1	(Thailand) J Kititharakul (Thailand) R Prajongjai	21	21
(Indonesia) A Imanuela (Indonesia) S F S Ramadhanti	8	9
(Thailand) K Dubthuk (Indonesia) R A Riodingin	12	23	18
(Indonesia) F D Kusuma (Indonesia) R Sugiarto	21	21	21
PFQ	(Thailand) M Bowonwitthanakul (Thailand) S Silprakob	11	9
(Indonesia) D D Haris (Indonesia) V Putri	21	21
(Thailand) P Supajirakul (Thailand) S Taerattanachai	21	21
(Indonesia) N K M Istirani (Indonesia) R A Pradipta	13	15

Second Round
1	(Thailand) J Kititharakul (Thailand) R Prajongjai	20	21	22
(Indonesia) F D Kusuma (Indonesia) R Sugiarto	22	10	20
(Indonesia) D D Haris (Indonesia) V Putri	14	15
(Thailand) P Supajirakul (Thailand) S Taerattanachai	21	21

Quarter-finals
1	(Thailand) J Kititharakul (Thailand) R Prajongjai	19	18
(Thailand) P Supajirakul (Thailand) S Taerattanachai	21	21

==== Section 2 ====
First Round
4	(France) É Lefel (France) A Tran	21	21
Q3	(Thailand) K Khongdee (Thailand) N Kwandaeng	14	18
(Hong Kong) Ng W Y (Hong Kong) Yeung N T	21	14	21
Q4	(China) Cao TW (China) Yan CX	18	21	15
7	(Russia) E Bolotova (Russia) A Davletova	23	21
(Thailand) S Chaikittiwat (Thailand) S Paewsampran	21	18
(China) Chen YY (China) Zhang SX	21	21
(India) A Balan (India) Sruthi K. P.	13	10

Second Round
4	(France) É Lefel (France) A Tran	20	19
(Hong Kong) Ng W Y (Hong Kong) Yeung N T	22	21
7	(Russia) E Bolotova (Russia) A Davletova	21	14	21
(China) Chen YY (China) Zhang SX	16	21	18

Quarter-finals
(Hong Kong) Ng W Y (Hong Kong) Yeung N T	12	17
7	(Russia) E Bolotova (Russia) A Davletova	21	21

=== Bottom half ===
==== Section 3 ====
First Round
Q2	(Thailand) P Choeikeewong (Thailand) P Suwatnodom	14	18
(Indonesia) Y Barkah (Indonesia) J F Sugiarto	21	21
PFQ	(Thailand) N Chatupornkarnchana (Thailand) S Shumnibannakarn	21	12	13
6	(Netherlands) S Piek (Netherlands) C Seinen	18	21	21
(Thailand) P Chochuwong (Thailand) A Sapniti	11	11
(Chinese Taipei) Pai Y-p (Chinese Taipei) Wu T-j	21	21
(Chinese Taipei) Hsu Y-c (Chinese Taipei) Hu L-f	18	21	15
3	(Thailand) C Chaladchalam (Thailand) P Muenwong	21	16	21

Second Round
(Indonesia) Y Barkah (Indonesia) J F Sugiarto	15	14
6	(Netherlands) S Piek (Netherlands) C Seinen	21	21
(Chinese Taipei) Pai Y-p (Chinese Taipei) Wu T-j	18	13
3	(Thailand) C Chaladchalam (Thailand) P Muenwong	21	21

Quarter-finals
6	(Netherlands) S Piek (Netherlands) C Seinen	21	21
3	(Thailand) C Chaladchalam (Thailand) P Muenwong	12	13

==== Section 4 ====
First Round
PFQ	(Thailand) S Kanchanasaka (Thailand) N Sukklad	21	15	21
PFQ	(Thailand) T Kaweenuntavong (Thailand) P Khantaruangsakul	10	21	16
(Hong Kong) Ng T Y (Hong Kong) Yuen S Y	9	21
5	(China) Li WM (China) Zheng Y	21	23
Q1	(Thailand) C Korepap (Thailand) K Sudjaipraparat	21	21
(United States) E Kan (United States) I Zhong	7	9
(France) D Delrue (France) L Palermo	10	21	16
2	(Japan) N Matsuyama (Japan) C Shida	21	18	21

Second Round
PFQ	(Thailand) S Kanchanasaka (Thailand) N Sukklad	6	8
5	(China) Li WM (China) Zheng Y	21	21
Q1	(Thailand) C Korepap (Thailand) K Sudjaipraparat	13	7
2	(Japan) N Matsuyama (Japan) C Shida	21	21

Quarter-finals
5	(China) Li WM (China) Zheng Y	24	21
2	(Japan) N Matsuyama (Japan) C Shida	22	12

== Mixed doubles ==
=== Seeds ===
1. (Malaysia) Chan Peng Soon / Goh Liu Ying (champions)
2. (Thailand) Dechapol Puavaranukroh / Sapsiree Taerattanachai (final)
3. (China) Lu Kai / Chen Lu (withdrew)
4. (Indonesia) Akbar Bintang Cahyono / Winny Oktavina Kandow (quarter-finals)
5. (Indonesia) Ronald Alexander / Annisa Saufika (second round)
6. (Thailand) Nipitphon Phuangphuapet / Savitree Amitrapai (semi-finals)
7. (Malaysia) Chen Tang Jie / Peck Yen Wei (second round)
8. (Hong Kong) Tang Chun Man / Ng Tsz Yau (semi-finals)

=== Finals ===
Semi-finals
1	(Malaysia) Chan Peng Soon (Malaysia) Goh Liu Ying	21	21
8	(Hong Kong) Tang Chun Man (Hong Kong) Ng Tsz Yau	16	15
6	(Thailand) Nipitphon Phuangphuapet (Thailand) Savitree Amitrapai	18	16
2	(Thailand) Dechapol Puavaranukroh (Thailand) Sapsiree Taerattanachai	21	21

Final
1	(Malaysia) Chan Peng Soon (Malaysia) Goh Liu Ying	21	21
2	(Thailand) Dechapol Puavaranukroh (Thailand) Sapsiree Taerattanachai	16	15

=== Top half ===
==== Section 1 ====
First Round
1	(Malaysia) Chan P S (Malaysia) Goh L Y	21	21
(Thailand) T Isriyanet (Thailand) C Korepap	16	10
Q4	(Thailand) S Jomkoh (Thailand) S Paewsampran	17	17
(Russia) R Alimov (Russia) A Davletova	21	21
7	(Malaysia) Chen T J (Malaysia) Peck Y W	16	21	21
(Chinese Taipei) Lin C-y (Chinese Taipei) Hsu Y-c	21	12	13
(Indonesia) A E Prasetya (Indonesia) M G Islami	21	18	21
PFQ	(Malaysia) M Arif A L (Indonesia) R A Riodingin	18	21	17

Second Round
1	(Malaysia) Chan P S (Malaysia) Goh L Y	21	21
(Russia) R Alimov (Russia) A Davletova	18	10
7	(Malaysia) Chen T J (Malaysia) Peck Y W	21	22	12
(Indonesia) A E Prasetya (Indonesia) M G Islami	23	20	21

Quarter-finals
1	(Malaysia) Chan P S (Malaysia) Goh L Y	21	22
(Indonesia) A E Prasetya (Indonesia) M G Islami	12	20

==== Section 2 ====
First Round
4	(Indonesia) A B Cahyono (Indonesia) W O Kandow	21	21
PFQ	(Indonesia) A P R Putra (Indonesia) T R Nuraidah	18	19
PFQ	(India) S. Sunjith Jr. (India) Sruthi K. P	15	13
(Republic of Ireland) S Magee (Republic of Ireland) C Magee	21	21
8	(Hong Kong) Tang C M (Hong Kong) Ng T Y	21	22
(Indonesia) R N Kusharjanto (Indonesia) S F S Ramadhanti	19	20
(Hong Kong) Chang T C (Hong Kong) Ng W Y	21	21
(France) T Gicquel (France) D Delrue	17	15

Second Round
4	(Indonesia) A B Cahyono (Indonesia) W O Kandow	21	21
(Republic of Ireland) S Magee (Republic of Ireland) C Magee	15	15
8	(Hong Kong) Tang C M (Hong Kong) Ng T Y	21	21
(Hong Kong) Chang T C (Hong Kong) Ng W Y	12	14

Quarter-finals
4	(Indonesia) A B Cahyono (Indonesia) W O Kandow	19	15
8	(Hong Kong) Tang C M (Hong Kong) Ng T Y	21	21

=== Bottom half ===
==== Section 3 ====
First Round
(Israel) M Zilberman (Israel) S Zilberman	15	18
(India) V G Prasad (India) J Dewangan	21	21
(Malaysia) Hoo P R (Malaysia) Cheah Y S	20	21	13
6	(Thailand) N Phuangphuapet (Thailand) S Amitrapai	22	16	21
(Vietnam) Đỗ T Đ (Vietnam) Phạm N T	11	9
(Chinese Taipei) Yang M-t (Chinese Taipei) Wu T-j	21	21
PFQ	(Hong Kong) Chung Y (Hong Kong) Yuen S Y	19	17
PFQ	(Thailand) P Thongnuam (Thailand) K Dubthuk	21	21

Second Round
(India) V G Prasad (India) J Dewangan	16	17
6	(Thailand) N Phuangphuapet (Thailand) S Amitrapai	21	21
(Chinese Taipei) Yang M-t (Chinese Taipei) Wu T-j	12	12
PFQ	(Thailand) P Thongnuam (Thailand) K Dubthuk	21	21

Quarter-finals
6	(Thailand) N Phuangphuapet (Thailand) S Amitrapai	21	21
PFQ	(Thailand) P Thongnuam (Thailand) K Dubthuk	16	19

==== Section 4 ====
First Round
Q3	(Hong Kong) Mak H C (Hong Kong) Chau H W	19	23	17
(Netherlands) R Tabeling (Netherlands) S Piek	21	21	21
(France) R Labar (France) A Mittelheisser	12	14
5	(Indonesia) R Alexander (Indonesia) A Saufika	21	21
Q2	(Japan) Y Kubota (Japan) N Matsuyama	11	9
(England) B Lane (England) J Pugh	21	21
Q1	(Hong Kong) Yeung M N (Hong Kong) Yeung N T	11	5
2	(Thailand) D Puavaranukroh (Thailand) S Taerattanachai	21	21

Second Round
(Netherlands) R Tabeling (Netherlands) S Piek	21	21
5	(Indonesia) R Alexander (Indonesia) A Saufika	18	17
(England) B Lane (England) J Pugh	21	13
2	(Thailand) D Puavaranukroh (Thailand) S Taerattanachai	23	21

Quarter-finals
(Netherlands) R Tabeling (Netherlands) S Piek	16	14
2	(Thailand) D Puavaranukroh (Thailand) S Taerattanachai	21	21

Preceded by 2018 BWF World Tour Finals	BWF World Tour; 2019 BWF season	Succeeded by 2019 Malaysia Masters
