= Ade Yusuf Santoso =

Indonesian badminton player (born 1993)

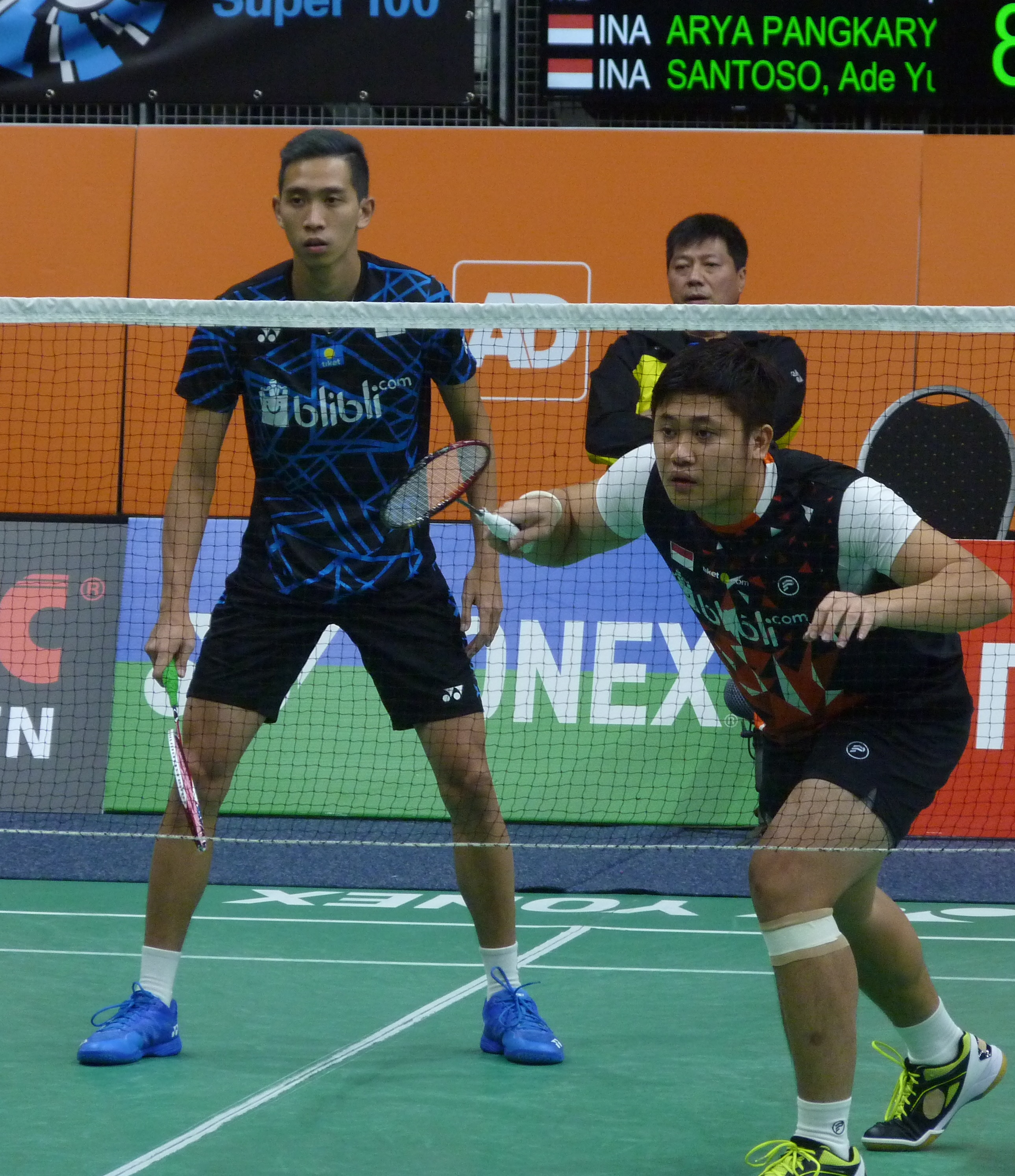
- Ade (left) at the 2018 Dutch Open

Personal information
- Born: Ade Yusuf Santoso; 19 May 1993 (age 33) Surabaya, East Java, Indonesia
- Height: 1.80 m (5 ft 11 in)

Sport
- Country: Indonesia
- Sport: Badminton
- Handedness: Right

Men's doubles
- Highest ranking: 16 (with Wahyu Nayaka 29 October 2015)
- BWF profile
Medal record
Men's badminton
Representing Indonesia
SEA Games
Gold medal – first place	2019 Philippines	Men's team
Bronze medal – third place	2019 Philippines	Men's doubles

Ade Yusuf Santoso (born 19 May 1993) is an Indonesian badminton player from the Hi-Qua Wima club in Surabaya.

== Career ==
In September 2023, Ade Yusuf Santoso and his partner Hardianto lost at the first round of Indonesia Masters Super 100 I from 8th seed Chinese Taipei pair Chen Zhi-ray and Lu Chen in straight games.

== Achievements ==
=== SEA Games ===
Men's doubles
Year	Venue	Partner	Opponent	Score	Result	Ref.
2019	Muntinlupa Sports Complex; Metro Manila, Philippines	(Indonesia) Wahyu Nayaka	(Malaysia) Aaron Chia (Malaysia) Soh Wooi Yik	12–21, 21–18, 19–21	Bronze	

=== BWF World Tour (1 title, 3 runners-up) ===
The BWF World Tour, which was announced on 19 March 2017 and implemented in 2018, is a series of elite badminton tournaments sanctioned by the Badminton World Federation (BWF). The BWF World Tours are divided into levels of World Tour Finals, Super 1000, Super 750, Super 500, Super 300 (part of the HSBC World Tour), and the BWF Tour Super 100.

Men's doubles
Year	Tournament	Level	Partner	Opponent	Score	Result	Ref.
2018	Thailand Masters	Super 300	(Indonesia) Wahyu Nayaka	(Thailand) Tinn Isriyanet (Thailand) Kittisak Namdash	18–21, 21–11, 20–22	(silver) Runner-up	
2018	Australian Open	Super 300	(Indonesia) Wahyu Nayaka	(Indonesia) Berry Angriawan (Indonesia) Hardianto	9–21, 21–9, 15–21	(silver) Runner-up	
2018	Dutch Open ^{(2)}	Super 100	(Indonesia) Wahyu Nayaka	(Netherlands) Jelle Maas (Netherlands) Robin Tabeling	21–19, 17–21, 21–11	(gold) Winner	
2023	Vietnam Open	Super 100	(Indonesia) Hardianto	(Japan) Kenya Mitsuhashi (Japan) Hiroki Okamura	19–21, 19–21	(silver) Runner-up	

=== BWF Grand Prix (4 titles) ===
The BWF Grand Prix had two levels, the BWF Grand Prix and Grand Prix Gold. It was a series of badminton tournaments sanctioned by the Badminton World Federation (BWF) which was held from 2007 to 2017.

Men's doubles
Year	Tournament	Partner	Opponent	Score	Result	Ref.
2013	Dutch Open ^{(1)}	(Indonesia) Wahyu Nayaka	(Indonesia) Berry Angriawan (Indonesia) Ricky Karanda Suwardi	14–21, 21–18, 21–17	(gold) Winner	
2015	Thailand Open ^{(1)}	(Indonesia) Wahyu Nayaka	(Malaysia) Koo Kien Keat (Malaysia) Tan Boon Heong	20–22, 23–21, 21–16	(gold) Winner	
2017	Vietnam Open ^{(1)}	(Indonesia) Wahyu Nayaka	(Chinese Taipei) Liao Min-chun (Chinese Taipei) Su Ching-heng	12–21, 21–16, 23–21	(gold) Winner	
2017	Macau Open ^{(1)}	(Indonesia) Wahyu Nayaka	(South Korea) Kim Won-ho (South Korea) Seo Seung-jae	21–13, 21–14	(gold) Winner	

BWF Grand Prix Gold tournament
BWF Grand Prix tournament

=== BWF International Challenge/Series (4 titles, 1 runner-up) ===
Men's doubles
Year	Tournament	Partner	Opponent	Score	Result	Ref.
2013	Iran Fajr International	(Indonesia) Wahyu Nayaka	(Indonesia) Selvanus Geh (Indonesia) Ronald Alexander	21–19, 13–21, 22–20	(gold) Winner	
2017	Indonesia International	(Indonesia) Wahyu Nayaka	(Indonesia) Kenas Adi Haryanto (Indonesia) Muhammad Reza Pahlevi Isfahani	21–18, 16–21, 21–19	(gold) Winner	
2022	Indonesia International	(Indonesia) Alfian Eko Prasetya	(Indonesia) Reinard Dhanriano (Indonesia) Kenas Adi Haryanto	21–16, 18–21, 21–16	(gold) Winner	
2023	Vietnam International	(Indonesia) Alfian Eko Prasetya	(South Korea) Jin Yong (South Korea) Na Sung-seung	8–21, 6–21	(silver) Runner-up	
2026	Singapore International	(Indonesia) Erwin Rendana Purnomo	(Indonesia) Sansan Herdiansyah (Indonesia) Adriel Ferdinand Leonardo	17–21, 21–11, 21–17	(gold) Winner	

BWF International Challenge tournament
BWF International Series tournament

=== Invitational tournament ===
Men's doubles
Year	Tournament	Partner	Opponent	Score	Result	Ref.
2015	Copenhagen Masters	(Indonesia) Wahyu Nayaka	(Denmark) Mathias Boe (Denmark) Carsten Mogensen	13–21, 16–21	(silver) Runner-up	

== Performance timeline ==
Key

W	Won	F	Finalist	SF	Semi-finalist
QF	Quarter-finalist	#R	Rounds 4, 3, 2, 1	RR	Round-robin stage
Q#	Qualification round	A	Absent	w/d	Withdrew
G	Gold	S	Silver	B	Bronze
NH	Not held	N/A	Not applicable	DNQ	Did not qualify

=== National team ===
- Senior level

Team events	2017	2018	2019
SEA Games	A	NH	G
Asia Mixed Team Championships	QF	NH	A

=== Individual competitions ===
- Senior level

Events	2015	2016	2017	2018	2019	Ref
SEA Games	A	NH	A	NH	B	
Asian Championships	3R	A			2R	
World Championships	3R	NH	A	2R	A	

Tournament	BWF Super Series / Grand Prix						BWF World Tour							Best	Ref
Tournament	2012	2013	2014	2015	2016	2017	2018	2019	2020	2021	2022	2023	2024	Best	Ref
Malaysia Open	A		1R	1R	A			2R	NH		A			2R ('19)	
India Open	A		2R	A					NH		A			2R ('14)	
Indonesia Masters	2R	QF	SF	QF	1R	NH	1R	2R	1R	A				SF ('14)	
Thailand Masters	NH				A	2R	F	2R	A	NH		A		F ('18)	
French Open	A		1R	A				2R	NH	A				2R ('19)	
All England Open	A		1R	1R	A			1R	1R	A				1R ('14, '15, '19, '20)	
Swiss Open	A		2R	2R	A			QF	NH	A				QF ('19)	
Thailand Open	A	1R	NH	W	A		QF	1R	A	NH	2R	A		W ('15)	
Malaysia Masters	A	1R	A	2R	A		2R	2R	1R	NH	A			2R ('15, '18, '19)	
Singapore Open	A		1R	QF	A			1R	NH		A			QF ('15)	
Indonesia Open	1R	1R	1R	QF	A		1R	2R	NH	A	1R	A		QF ('15)	
Australian Open	A			2R	A		F	2R	NH		A			F ('18)	
Japan Open	A			1R	A		2R	2R	NH		A			2R ('18, '19)	
Korea Open	A		2R	2R	A			2R	NH		A			2R ('14, '15, '19)	
Indonesia Masters Super 100	NH						A		NH		QF	1R	SF	SF ('24)	
Indonesia Masters Super 100	NH						A		NH		QF	A		SF ('24)	
Chinese Taipei Open	A		2R	2R	A			2R	NH		A			2R ('14, '15, '19)	
Vietnam Open	A		QF	A		W	A		NH		A	F	A	W ('17)	
Hong Kong Open	A			1R	A		1R	2R	NH			A		2R ('19)	
China Open	A						1R	2R	NH			A		2R ('19)	
Macau Open	A		SF	1R	A	W	1R	A	NH				A	W ('17)	
Denmark Open	A						1R	2R	A					2R ('19)	
Malaysia Super 100	NH											QF	A	QF ('23)	
Bitburger Open	A		2R	A										2R ('14)	
Korea Masters	A			2R	A	1R	A		NH		A			2R ('15)	
China Masters	A					1R	2R	1R	NH			A		2R ('18)	
Syed Modi International	QF	NH	A						NH		A			QF ('12)	
Dutch Open	A	W	A				W	A	NH	N/A				W ('13, '18)	
London Grand Prix Gold	NH	SF	NH											SF ('13)	
New Zealand Open	NH	A				QF	2R	A	NH					QF ('17)	
Year-end ranking	66	36	32	21	496	38	24	27	26	26	138	136	233	16	
Tournament	2012	2013	2014	2015	2016	2017	2018	2019	2020	2021	2022	2023	2024	Best	

== Record against selected opponents ==
Record against year-end Finals finalists, World Championships semi-finalists, and Olympic quarter-finalists.

Wahyu Nayaka

- (China) Chai Biao & Hong Wei 1–1
- (Denmark) Mads Pieler Kolding & Mads Conrad-Petersen 2–0
- (Denmark) Mathias Boe & Carsten Mogensen 0–3
- (Indonesia) Mohammad Ahsan & Hendra Setiawan 0–1
- (Japan) Hiroyuki Endo & Kenichi Hayakawa 0–3
- (Japan) Takeshi Kamura & Keigo Sonoda 0–1
- (South Korea) Ko Sung-hyun & Shin Baek-cheol 1–1
- (South Korea) Ko Sung-hyun & Yoo Yeon-seong 0–1
- (South Korea) Lee Yong-dae & Yoo Yeon-seong 0–3
- (Malaysia) Koo Kien Keat & Tan Boon Heong 1–0
