= Wahyu Nayaka =

Indonesian badminton player (born 1992)

Wahyu Nayaka Arya Pankaryanira
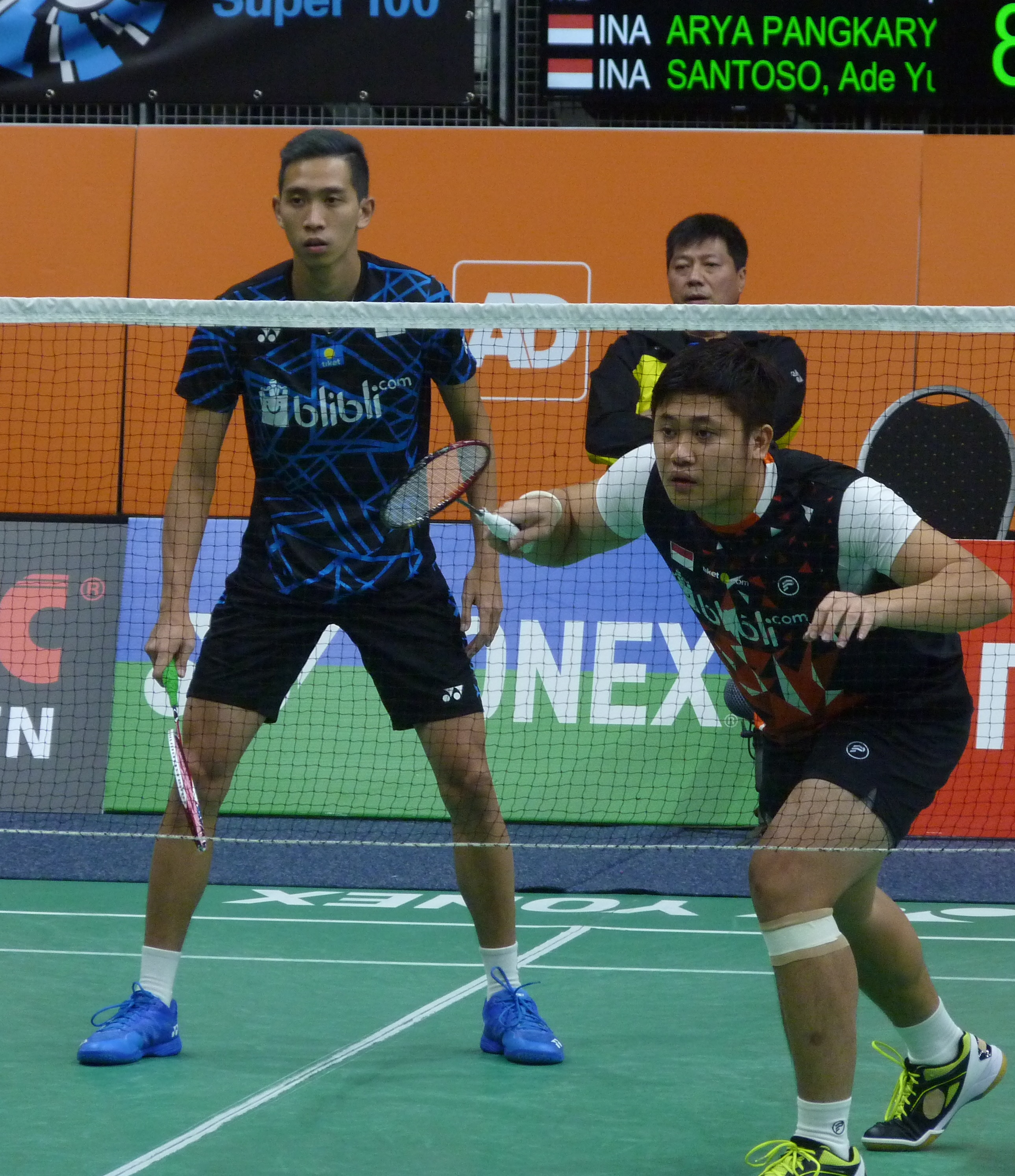
- Nayaka (right) at 2018 Dutch Open

Personal information
- Born: Wahyu Nayaka Arya Pankaryanira; 22 June 1992 (age 34) East Lombok, West Nusa Tenggara, Indonesia
- Height: 1.76 m (5 ft 9 1/2 in)

Sport
- Country: Indonesia
- Sport: Badminton
- Handedness: Right

Men's doubles
- Highest ranking: 16 (with Ade Yusuf 29 October 2015)
- BWF profile
Medal record
Men's badminton
Representing Indonesia
SEA Games
Gold medal – first place	2019 Philippines	Men's team
Bronze medal – third place	2019 Philippines	Men's doubles

Wahyu Nayaka Arya Pankaryanira (born 22 June 1992) is an Indonesian badminton player who plays in doubles category. Born in East Lombok, Pankaryanira has joined the Ratih club in Banten.

== Achievements ==
=== SEA Games ===
Men's doubles
Year	Venue	Partner	Opponent	Score	Result	Ref.
2019	Muntinlupa Sports Complex; Metro Manila, Philippines	(Indonesia) Ade Yusuf	(Malaysia) Aaron Chia (Malaysia) Soh Wooi Yik	12–21, 21–18, 19–21	Bronze	

=== BWF World Tour (1 title, 2 runners-up) ===
The BWF World Tour, which was announced on 19 March 2017 and implemented in 2018, is a series of elite badminton tournaments sanctioned by the Badminton World Federation (BWF). The BWF World Tour is divided into levels of World Tour Finals, Super 1000, Super 750, Super 500, Super 300, and the BWF Tour Super 100.

Men's doubles
Year	Tournament	Level	Partner	Opponent	Score	Result	Ref.
2018	Thailand Masters	Super 300	(Indonesia) Ade Yusuf	(Thailand) Tinn Isriyanet (Thailand) Kittisak Namdash	18–21, 21–11, 20–22	(silver) Runner-up	
2018	Australian Open	Super 300	(Indonesia) Ade Yusuf	(Indonesia) Berry Angriawan (Indonesia) Hardianto	9–21, 21–9, 15–21	(silver) Runner-up	
2018	Dutch Open ^{(2)}	Super 100	(Indonesia) Ade Yusuf	(Netherlands) Jelle Maas (Netherlands) Robin Tabeling	21–19, 17–21, 21–11	(gold) Winner	

=== BWF Grand Prix (5 titles) ===
The BWF Grand Prix had two levels, the BWF Grand Prix and Grand Prix Gold. It was a series of badminton tournaments sanctioned by the Badminton World Federation (BWF) which was held from 2007 to 2017.

Men's doubles
Year	Tournament	Partner	Opponent	Score	Result	Ref.
2013	Dutch Open	(Indonesia) Ade Yusuf	(Indonesia) Berry Angriawan (Indonesia) Ricky Karanda Suwardi	14–21, 21–18, 21–17	(gold) Winner	
2015	Thailand Open	(Indonesia) Ade Yusuf	(Malaysia) Koo Kien Keat (Malaysia) Tan Boon Heong	20–22, 23–21, 21–16	(gold) Winner	
2016	Indonesia Masters	(Indonesia) Kevin Sanjaya Sukamuljo	(China) Han Chengkai (China) Zhou Haodong	21–16, 21–18	(gold) Winner	
2017	Vietnam Open	(Indonesia) Ade Yusuf	(Chinese Taipei) Liao Min-chun (Chinese Taipei) Su Cheng-heng	12–21, 21–16, 23–21	(gold) Winner	
2017	Macau Open	(Indonesia) Ade Yusuf	(South Korea) Kim Won-ho (South Korea) Seo Seung-jae	21–13, 21–14	(gold) Winner	

BWF Grand Prix Gold tournament
BWF Grand Prix tournament

=== BWF International Challenge/Series (2 titles) ===
Men's doubles
Year	Tournament	Partner	Opponent	Score	Result	Ref.
2013	Iran Fajr International	(Indonesia) Ade Yusuf	(Indonesia) Selvanus Geh (Indonesia) Ronald Alexander	21–19, 13–21, 22–20	(gold) Winner	
2017	Indonesia International	(Indonesia) Ade Yusuf	(Indonesia) Kenas Adi Haryanto (Indonesia) Muhammad Reza Pahlevi Isfahani	21–18, 16–21, 21–19	(gold) Winner	

BWF International Challenge tournament
BWF International Series tournament

=== Invitational tournament ===
Men's doubles
Year	Tournament	Partner	Opponent	Score	Result	Ref.
2015	Copenhagen Masters	(Indonesia) Ade Yusuf	(Denmark) Mathias Boe (Denmark) Carsten Mogensen	13–21, 16–21	(silver) Runner-up	

== Performance timeline ==
Key

W	Won	F	Finalist	SF	Semi-finalist
QF	Quarter-finalist	#R	Rounds 4, 3, 2, 1	RR	Round-robin stage
Q#	Qualification round	A	Absent	w/d	Withdrew
G	Gold	S	Silver	B	Bronze
NH	Not held	N/A	Not applicable	DNQ	Did not qualify

=== National team ===
- Senior level

Team events	2017	2018	2019
SEA Games	A	NH	G
Asia Mixed Team Championships	QF	NH	A

=== Individual competitions ===
- Junior level

Events	2010
World Junior Championships	4R

- Senior level

Events	2015	2016	2017	2018	2019
SEA Games	A	NH	A	NH	B
Asian Championships	3R	A			2R
World Championships	3R	NH	A	2R	A

Tournament	BWF Super Series / Grand Prix						BWF World Tour					Best
Tournament	2012	2013	2014	2015	2016	2017	2018	2019	2020	2021	2022	Best
India Open	A		2R	A					NH		A	2R ('14)
Syed Modi International	QF	NH	A						NH		A	QF ('12)
All England Open	A		1R	1R	A			1R	1R	A		1R ('14, '15, '19, '20)
Swiss Open	A		2R	2R	A			QF	NH	A		QF ('19)
Korea Open	A		2R	2R	A			2R	NH		A	2R ('14, '15, '19)
Korea Masters	A			2R	A	1R	A		NH		A	2R ('15)
Thailand Open	A	1R	NH	W	A		QF	1R	A	NH	2R	W ('15)
Indonesia Masters	2R	QF	SF	QF	W	NH	1R	2R	1R	A		W ('16)
Indonesia Open	1R	1R	1R	QF	1R	A	1R	2R	NH	A	1R	QF ('15)
Malaysia Open	A		1R	1R	A			2R	NH		A	2R ('19)
Malaysia Masters	A	1R	A	2R	A		2R	2R	1R	NH	A	2R ('15, '18, '19)
Singapore Open	A		1R	QF	A			1R	NH		A	QF ('15)
Chinese Taipei Open	A		2R	2R	2R	A		2R	NH		A	2R ('14, '15, '16, '19)
Japan Open	A			1R	A		2R	2R	NH		A	2R ('18, '19)
Vietnam Open	A		QF	A		W	A		NH		2R	W ('17)
Denmark Open	A						1R	2R	A			2R ('19)
French Open	A		1R	A				2R	NH	A		2R ('19)
Bitburger Open	A		2R	A								2R ('14)
Macau Open	A		SF	1R	1R	W	1R	A	NH			W ('17)
Hong Kong Open	A			1R	A		1R	2R	NH			2R ('19)
Australian Open	A			2R	A		F	2R	NH		A	F ('18)
New Zealand Open	NH	A				QF	2R	A	NH			QF ('17)
China Open	A						1R	2R	NH			2R ('19)
Fuzhou China Open	A				1R	1R	2R	1R	NH			2R ('18)
Dutch Open	A	W	A				W	A	NH	NA		W ('13, '18)
London Grand Prix Gold	NH	SF	NH									SF ('13)
Thailand Masters	NH				A	2R	F	2R	A	NH		F ('18)
Year-end Ranking	66	36	32	21	145	38	24	27	26	26	414	16
Tournament	2012	2013	2014	2015	2016	2017	2018	2019	2020	2021	2022	Best

== Record against selected opponents ==
Men's doubles results against World Superseries finalists, World Superseries Finals semifinalists, World Championships semifinalists, and Olympic quarterfinalists paired with:

Ade Yusuf Santoso

- (China) Chai Biao & Hong Wei 1–1
- (China) Liu Cheng & Zhang Nan 0–1
- (Chinese Taipei) Lee Jhe-huei & Lee Yang 1–0
- (Chinese Taipei) Lee Sheng-mu & Tsai Chia-hsin 1–0
- (Denmark) Mads Pieler Kolding & Mads Conrad-Petersen 2–0
- (Denmark) Mathias Boe & Carsten Mogensen 0–3
- (Indonesia) Angga Pratama & Rian Agung Saputro 0–1
- (Indonesia) Marcus Fernaldi Gideon & Kevin Sanjaya Sukamuljo 1–1
- (Indonesia) Markis Kido & Marcus Fernaldi Gideon 0–2
- (Indonesia) Mohammad Ahsan & Hendra Setiawan 0–1
- (Japan) Hirokatsu Hashimoto & Noriyasu Hirata 0–1
- (Japan) Kenichi Hayakawa & Hiroyuki Endo 0–3
- (Japan) Takeshi Kamura & Keigo Sonoda 0–1
- (Japan) Takuto Inoue & Yuki Kaneko 0–1
- (South Korea) Ko Sung-hyun & Lee Yong-dae 0–2
- (South Korea) Ko Sung-hyun & Shin Baek-cheol 1–1
- (South Korea) Ko Sung-hyun & Yoo Yeon-seong 0–1
- (South Korea) Lee Yong-dae & Yoo Yeon-seong 0–3
- (Malaysia) Koo Kien Keat & Tan Boon Heong 1–0
- (Malaysia) Goh V Shem & Lim Khim Wah 0–1
- (Malaysia) Goh V Shem & Tan Wee Kiong 0–1
- (Malaysia) Hoon Thien How & Tan Wee Kiong 0–1
- (Russia) Vladimir Ivanov & Ivan Sozonov 2–1
