= 2018 Thailand Masters (badminton) =

2018 badminton tournament in Bangkok

Tournament details
- Dates: 9–14 January
- Edition: 3rd
- Level: Super 300
- Total prize money: US$150,000
- Venue: Nimibutr Stadium
- Location: Bangkok, Thailand

Champions
- Men's singles: (Indonesia) Tommy Sugiarto
- Women's singles: (Thailand) Nitchaon Jindapol
- Men's doubles: (Thailand) Tinn Isriyanet (Thailand) Kittisak Namdash
- Women's doubles: (Thailand) Jongkolphan Kititharakul (Thailand) Rawinda Prajongjai
- Mixed doubles: (Malaysia) Chan Peng Soon (Malaysia) Goh Liu Ying

The 2018 Thailand Masters, officially the Princess Sirivannavari Thailand Masters 2018, was a badminton tournament which took place at Nimibutr Stadium in Thailand from 9 to 14 January 2018 and had a total purse of $150,000.

== Tournament ==
The 2018 Thailand Masters was the first tournament of the 2018 BWF World Tour and also part of the Thailand Masters championships which had been held since 2016. This tournament was organized by the Badminton Association of Thailand with sanction from the BWF. It was also the first ever new Super 300 Level 5 tournament of the BWF World Tour schedule.

=== Venue ===
This international tournament was held at Nimibutr Stadium in Bangkok, Thailand.

=== Point distribution ===
Below is a table with the point distribution for each phase of the tournament based on the BWF points system for the BWF World Tour Super 300 event.

Winner	Runner-up	3/4	5/8	9/16	17/32	33/64	65/128
7,000	5,950	4,900	3,850	2,750	1,670	660	320

=== Prize money ===
The total prize money for this tournament was US$150,000. Distribution of prize money was in accordance with BWF regulations.

Event	Winner	Finals	Semifinals	Quarterfinals	Last 16
Singles	$11,250	$5,700	$2,175	$900	$525
Doubles	$11,850	$5,700	$2,100	$1087.50	$562.50

== Men's singles ==
=== Seeds ===
1. (Thailand) Tanongsak Saensomboonsuk (second round)
2. (Indonesia) Tommy Sugiarto (champion)
3. (Thailand) Khosit Phetpradab (first round)
4. (Hong Kong) Hu Yun (quarterfinals)
5. (Brazil) Ygor Coelho (first round)
6. (Netherlands) Mark Caljouw (withdrew)
7. (Hong Kong) Lee Cheuk Yiu (first round)
8. (Malaysia) Zulfadli Zulkiffli (first round)

=== Finals ===
Semifinals
(Thailand) Kantaphon Wangcharoen	22	19	18
Q2	(Malaysia) Leong Jun Hao	20	21	21
(Malaysia) Liew Daren	21	17	18
2	(Indonesia) Tommy Sugiarto	17	21	21

Final
Q2	(Malaysia) Leong Jun Hao	16	15
2	(Indonesia) Tommy Sugiarto	21	21

=== Top half ===
==== Section 1 ====
First Round
1	(Thailand) T Saensomboonsuk	21	21
Q1	(Indonesia) F I Hadmadi	14	12
(France) T Rouxel	22	10	4
(Thailand) K Wangcharoen	20	21	21
5	(Brazil) Y Coelho	15	17
PFQ	(Vietnam) Phạm C C	21	21
(India) A Yelegar	21	6
(Indonesia) I M Mustofa	23	21

Second Round
1	(Thailand) T Saensomboonsuk	19	4^{r}
(Thailand) K Wangcharoen	21	11
PFQ	(Vietnam) Phạm C C	17	14
(Indonesia) I M Mustofa	21	21

Quarterfinals
(Thailand) K Wangcharoen	21	21
(Indonesia) I M Mustofa	14	13

==== Section 2 ====
First Round
4	(Hong Kong) Hu Y	17	21	21
(Indonesia) S H Rhustavito	21	10	13
(Indonesia) P A Maulana	21	21
(Thailand) S Thammasin	19	19
8	(Malaysia) Z Zulkiffli	22	19
Q2	(Malaysia) Leong J H	24	21
(Denmark) K Bruun	11	22	19
(Indonesia) F A Kholik	21	20	21

Second Round
4	(Hong Kong) Hu Y	21	21
(Indonesia) P A Maulana	14	8
Q2	(Malaysia) Leong J H	25	21
(Indonesia) F A Kholik	23	12

Quarterfinals
4	(Hong Kong) Hu Y	15	22	7
Q2	(Malaysia) Leong J H	21	20	21

=== Bottom half ===
==== Section 3 ====
First Round
(Vietnam) Nguyễn T M	21	20	21
(Canada) J Ho-Shue	8	22	8
(Thailand) S Avihingsanon	21	22
7	(Hong Kong) Lee C Y	15	20
(Hong Kong) Wei N	21	21
(Thailand) A Namkul	19	9
(Malaysia) Liew D	21	18	23
3	(Thailand) K Phetpradab	18	21	21

Second Round
(Vietnam) Nguyễn T M	13	21	19
(Thailand) S Avihingsanon	21	9	21
(Hong Kong) Wei N	17	11
(Malaysia) Liew D	21	21

Quarterfinals
(Thailand) S Avihingsanon	15	18
(Malaysia) Liew D	21	21

==== Section 4 ====
First Round
Q3	(Japan) H Shimono	21	13	15
Q4	(Indonesia) D H Rumbaka	18	21	7^{r}
(Israel) M Zilberman	21	23
PFQ	(India) K R Rajarajan	13	21
(Thailand) P Thongnuam	21	21
(Malaysia) Tan J W	18	13
(France) L Corvée	13	14
2	(Indonesia) T Sugiarto	21	21

Second Round
Q3	(Japan) H Shimono	18	21	21
(Israel) M Zilberman	21	7	14
(Thailand) P Thongnuam	18	14
2	(Indonesia) T Sugiarto	21	21

Quarterfinals
Q3	(Japan) H Shimono	17	8
2	(Indonesia) T Sugiarto	21	21

== Women's singles ==
=== Seeds ===
1. (Thailand) Nitchaon Jindapol (champion)
2. (Thailand) Busanan Ongbumrungpan (withdrew)
3. (Thailand) Pornpawee Chochuwong (final)
4. (Malaysia) Sonia Cheah Su Ya (semifinals)
5. (Hong Kong) Yip Pui Yin (second round)
6. (Indonesia) Dinar Dyah Ayustine (first round)
7. (Indonesia) Gregoria Mariska Tunjung (quarterfinals)
8. (Malaysia) Goh Jin Wei (second round)

=== Finals ===
Semifinals
1	(Thailand) Nitchaon Jindapol	16	21	21
4	(Malaysia) Sonia Cheah Su Ya	21	15	17
3	(Thailand) Pornpawee Chochuwong	14	21	21
(Malaysia) Kisona Selvaduray	21	9	11

Final
1	(Thailand) Nitchaon Jindapol	21	21
3	(Thailand) Pornpawee Chochuwong	11	18

=== Top half ===
==== Section 1 ====
First Round
1	(Thailand) N Jindapol	21	21
Q3	(Thailand) N Aimsaard	13	12
(India) M Agrey	21	21
(Indonesia) F Angguni	15	13
7	(Indonesia) G M Tunjung	21	18	21
(India) S U R Chukka	8	21	11
(Indonesia) Y Y Susanto	21	19	21
(Singapore) G Chua	19	21	9

Second Round
1	(Thailand) N Jindapol	21	21
(India) M Agrey	13	13
7	(Indonesia) G M Tunjung	21	21
(Indonesia) Y Y Susanto	10	18

Quarterfinals
1	(Thailand) N Jindapol	21	22
7	(Indonesia) G M Tunjung	13	20

==== Section 2 ====
First Round
4	(Malaysia) S Cheah S Y	21	21
Q2	(Thailand) M Hemrachatanun	12	14
(India) V Choudari	20	17
(Thailand) T Poopradubsil	22	21
5	(Hong Kong) Yip P Y	21	21
(Indonesia) R A Riodingin	11	7
(Indonesia) L A Mainaky	21	11	8
(Japan) N Shimoda	14	21	21

Second Round
4	(Malaysia) S Cheah S Y	21	21
(Thailand) T Poopradubsil	14	10
5	(Hong Kong) Yip P Y	21	13	17
(Japan) N Shimoda	14	21	21

Quarterfinals
4	(Malaysia) S Cheah S Y	21	21
(Japan) N Shimoda	16	6

=== Bottom half ===
==== Section 3 ====
First Round
(Australia) Chen H-y	6	12
(Thailand) P Chaiwan	21	21
(Japan) N Nidaira	21	22
6	(Indonesia) D D Ayustine	10	20
(Indonesia) J Muljati	14	21	11
(Malaysia) Ho Y M	21	17	21
(France) D Lansac	8	5
3	(Thailand) P Chochuwong	21	21

Second Round
(Thailand) P Chaiwan	15	21	21
(Japan) N Nidaira	21	12	14
(Malaysia) Ho Y M	16	21	18
3	(Thailand) P Chochuwong	21	17	21

Quarterfinals
(Thailand) P Chaiwan	16	16
3	(Thailand) P Chochuwong	21	21

==== Section 4 ====
First Round
(Malaysia) K Selvaduray	16	21	21
(Indonesia) R Hartawan	21	12	14
Q1	(Thailand) C Korepap	16	21	14
8	(Malaysia) Goh J W	21	17	21
Q4	(Thailand) M Lerthattasin	21	21
(India) V R Jakka	10	13
(Malaysia) Lee Y Y	21	21
PFQ	(Thailand) C Jucharoen	18	6

Second Round
(Malaysia) K Selvaduray	21	13	21
8	(Malaysia) Goh J W	18	21	10
Q4	(Thailand) M Lerthattasin	11	11
(Malaysia) Lee Y Y	21	21

Quarterfinals
(Malaysia) K Selvaduray	23	21
(Malaysia) Lee Y Y	21	17

== Men's doubles ==
=== Seeds ===
1. (Indonesia) Berry Angriawan / Hardianto (semifinals)
2. (Indonesia) Fajar Alfian / Muhammad Rian Ardianto (quarterfinals)
3. (Malaysia) Goh V Shem / Tan Wee Kiong (semifinals)
4. (Malaysia) Ong Yew Sin / Teo Ee Yi (quarterfinals)
5. (Thailand) Kittinupong Kedren / Dechapol Puavaranukroh (first round)
6. (Malaysia) Low Juan Shen / Chooi Kah Ming (first round)
7. (Indonesia) Wahyu Nayaka / Ade Yusuf Santoso (final)
8. (Netherlands) Jacco Arends / Ruben Jille (first round)

=== Finals ===
Semifinals
1	(Indonesia) Berry Angriawan (Indonesia) Hardianto	17	17
7	(Indonesia) Wahyu Nayaka (Indonesia) Ade Yusuf Santoso	21	21
3	(Malaysia) Goh V Shem (Malaysia) Tan Wee Kiong	15	20
(Thailand) Tinn Isriyanet (Thailand) Kittisak Namdash	21	22

Final
7	(Indonesia) Wahyu Nayaka (Indonesia) Ade Yusuf Santoso	18	21	20
(Thailand) Tinn Isriyanet (Thailand) Kittisak Namdash	21	11	22

=== Top half ===
==== Section 1 ====
First Round
1	(Indonesia) B Angriawan (Indonesia) Hardianto	21	14	21
(Hong Kong) Chang T C (Hong Kong) Yeung M N	12	21	16
(Thailand) I Apisuk (Thailand) T Viriyangkura	21	21
(India) A R Mandiraju (India) V G Prasad	19	19
5	(Thailand) K Kedren (Thailand) D Puavaranukroh	17	21	18
(Japan) M Kaneko (Japan) Y Kubota	21	12	21
(Canada) J Ho-Shue (Canada) N Yakura	22	26	21
Q3	(Indonesia) R Kurniawan (Indonesia) K M Sugiarto	20	28	16

Second Round
1	(Indonesia) B Angriawan (Indonesia) Hardianto	21	21	23
(Thailand) I Apisuk (Thailand) T Viriyangkura	23	13	21
(Japan) M Kaneko (Japan) Y Kubota	21	21
(Canada) J Ho-Shue (Canada) N Yakura	17	16

Quarterfinals
1	(Indonesia) B Angriawan (Indonesia) Hardianto	21	21
(Japan) M Kaneko (Japan) Y Kubota	15	11

==== Section 2 ====
First Round
4	(Malaysia) Ong Y S (Malaysia) Teo E Y	21	21
(France) B Kersaudy (France) J Maio	7	18
Q4	(Hong Kong) Ho W L (Hong Kong) Tam C H	13	21	17
(Australia) M Chau (Australia) S Serasinghe	21	17	21
7	(Indonesia) W Nayaka (Indonesia) A Y Santoso	21	25
(Thailand) C Charoenkitamorn (Thailand) M Narongrit	15	23
PFQ	(Indonesia) M Maftuki (Indonesia) Y Rambitan	9	10
(Sweden) R Eidestedt (Netherlands) R Tabeling	21	21

Second Round
4	(Malaysia) Ong Y S (Malaysia) Teo E Y	21	21
(Australia) M Chau (Australia) S Serasinghe	8	12
7	(Indonesia) W Nayaka (Indonesia) A Y Santoso	21	21
(Sweden) R Eidestedt (Netherlands) R Tabeling	16	18

Quarterfinals
4	(Malaysia) Ong Y S (Malaysia) Teo E Y	19	11
7	(Indonesia) W Nayaka (Indonesia) A Yusuf	21	21

=== Bottom half ===
==== Section 3 ====
First Round
(Hong Kong) Chan T K (Hong Kong) Chung Y	21	21
(Vietnam) Bảo M (Vietnam) Dương B Đ	12	12
(Thailand) S Jomkoh (Thailand) P Kuna-Anuvit	21	19	21
8	(Netherlands) J Arends (Netherlands) R Jille	17	21	18
(Hong Kong) Lam W L (Hong Kong) Li K H	16	21	21
(Indonesia) I A Wirawan (Indonesia) R Perdana	21	13	17
(India) K Chaudhary (India) B Yadav	6	16
3	(Malaysia) Goh V S (Malaysia) Tan W K	21	21

Second Round
(Hong Kong) Chan T K (Hong Kong) Y Chung	11	17
(Thailand) S Jomkoh (Thailand) P Kuna-Anuvit	21	21
(Hong Kong) Lam W L (Hong Kong) Li K H	7	11
3	(Malaysia) Goh V S (Malaysia) Tan W K	21	21

Quarterfinals
(Thailand) S Jomkoh (Thailand) P Kuna-Anuvit	23	16
3	(Malaysia) Goh V S (Malaysia) Tan W K	25	21

==== Section 4 ====
First Round
(Thailand) W Sothon (Thailand) N Trinkajee	21	21
Q2	(Thailand) W Phakjarung (Thailand) P Saengvanich	19	16
(Thailand) T Isriyanet (Thailand) K Namdash	19	21	21
6	(Malaysia) Chooi K M (Malaysia) Low J S	21	17	15
Q1	(Thailand) A Thaptimdong (Thailand) T Thawornwong	9	4
(Hong Kong) Mak H C (Hong Kong) Yeung S C	21	21
(Malaysia) Goh S F (Malaysia) N Izzuddin	21	21	17
2	(Indonesia) F Alfian (Indonesia) M R Ardianto	23	18	21

Second Round
(Thailand) W Sothon (Thailand) N Trinkajee	21	13	14
(Thailand) T Isriyanet (Thailand) K Namdash	15	21	21
(Hong Kong) Mak H C (Hong Kong) Yeung S C	15	9
2	(Indonesia) F Alfian (Indonesia) M R Ardianto	21	21

Quarterfinals
(Thailand) T Isriyanet (Thailand) K Namdash	24	21
2	(Indonesia) F Alfian (Indonesia) M R Ardianto	22	19

== Women's doubles ==
=== Seeds ===
1. (Thailand) Jongkolphan Kititharakul / Rawinda Prajongjai (champions)
2. (Indonesia) Anggia Shitta Awanda / Ni Ketut Mahadewi Istarani (final)
3. (Malaysia) Chow Mei Kuan / Lee Meng Yean (semifinals)
4. (Thailand) Chayanit Chaladchalam / Phataimas Muenwong (quarterfinals)
5. (Indonesia) Della Destiara Haris / Rizki Amelia Pradipta (quarterfinals)
6. (Australia) Setyana Mapasa / Gronya Somerville (quarterfinals)
7. (Netherlands) Selena Piek / Cheryl Seinen (first round)
8. (Germany) Johanna Goliszewski / Lara Käpplein (second round)

=== Finals ===
Semifinals
1	(Thailand) Jongkolphan Kititharakul (Thailand) Rawinda Prajongjai	18	21	21
3	(Malaysia) Chow Mei Kuan (Malaysia) Lee Meng Yean	21	13	17
(Thailand) Savitree Amitrapai (Thailand) Pacharapun Chochuwong	14	18
2	(Indonesia) Anggia Shitta Awanda (Indonesia) Ni Ketut Mahadewi Istarani	21	21

Final
1	(Thailand) Jongkolphan Kititharakul (Thailand) Rawinda Prajongjai	21	21
2	(Indonesia) Anggia Shitta Awanda (Indonesia) Ni Ketut Mahadewi Istarani	19	17

=== Top half ===
==== Section 1 ====
First Round
1	(Thailand) J Kititharakul (Thailand) R Prajongjai	21	21
Q1	(Thailand) C Charoenwat (Thailand) P Eksorakul	11	12
Q4	(Thailand) M Bowonwitthanakul (Thailand) S Suppasang	12	13
(Thailand) K Dubthuk (Thailand) N Saengchote	21	21
5	(Indonesia) D D Haris (Indonesia) R A Pradipta	21	21
(Thailand) S Kanchanasaka (Thailand) K Sukklad	14	9
(Sweden) A Högström (Sweden) C Nistad	20	18
(Thailand) R Laisuan (Thailand) S Mingchua	22	21

Second Round
1	(Thailand) J Kititharakul (Thailand) R Prajongjai	21	21
(Thailand) K Dubthuk (Thailand) N Saengchote	19	10
5	(Indonesia) D D Haris (Indonesia) R A Pradipta	21	21
(Thailand) R Laisuan (Thailand) S Mingchua	9	5

Quarterfinals
1	(Thailand) J Kititharakul (Thailand) R Prajongjai	12	21	21
5	(Indonesia) D D Haris (Indonesia) R A Pradipta	21	19	16

==== Section 2 ====
First Round
3	(Malaysia) Chow M K (Malaysia) Lee M Y	21	21
(Hong Kong) Poon L Y (Hong Kong) Wu Y T	10	12
(Thailand) S Chaikittiwat (Thailand) S Chumnibannakarn	15	17
(Indonesia) Y Barkah (Indonesia) N K Maheswari	21	21
8	(Germany) J Goliszewski (Germany) L Käpplein	22	21
(Thailand) S Paewsampran (Thailand) K Sudjaipraparat	20	18
(Singapore) Ong R N (Singapore) C Wong	13	15
(Indonesia) A Imanuela (Indonesia) S F S Ramadhanti	21	21

Second Round
3	(Malaysia) Chow M K (Malaysia) Lee M Y	21	15	21
(Indonesia) Y Barkah (Indonesia) N K Maheswari	18	21	7
8	(Germany) J Goliszewski (Germany) L Käpplein	15	14
(Indonesia) A Imanuela (Indonesia) S F S Ramadhanti	21	21

Quarterfinals
3	(Malaysia) Chow M K (Malaysia) Lee M Y	21	21
(Indonesia) A Imanuela (Indonesia) S F S Ramadhanti	11	14

=== Bottom half ===
==== Section 3 ====
First Round
(Hong Kong) Ng T Y (Hong Kong) Yuen S Y	21	21
(Indonesia) A F Laili (Indonesia) Z M R Permata	8	9
(Thailand) S Amitrapai (Thailand) P Chochuwong	21	21
7	(Netherlands) S Piek (Netherlands) C Seinen	8	13
PFQ	(India) A Balan (India) Sruthi K. P.	21	17	21
(Indonesia) K N Hanadia (Indonesia) D T Permatasari	19	21	12
PFQ	(Thailand) R Iamratanamaetheekul (Thailand) S Katethong	13	11
4	(Thailand) C Chaladchalam (Thailand) P Muenwong	21	21

Second Round
(Hong Kong) Ng T Y (Hong Kong) Yuen S Y	18	9
(Thailand) S Amitrapai (Thailand) P Chochuwong	21	21
PFQ	(India) A Balan (India) Sruthi K. P.	12	10
4	(Thailand) C Chaladchalam (Thailand) P Muenwong	21	21

Quarterfinals
(Thailand) S Amitrapai (Thailand) P Chochuwong	5
4	(Thailand) C Chaladchalam (Thailand) P Muenwong	4^{r}

==== Section 4 ====
First Round
(Hong Kong) Ng W Y (Hong Kong) Yeung N T	21	21
(United States) A Lee (United States) S Lee	6	10
Q3	(Thailand) P Anandechjurakun (Thailand) M Hemrachatanun	14	9
6	(Australia) S Mapasa (Australia) G Somerville	21	21
Q2	(Thailand) T Kleebyeesoon (Thailand) W Patimon	20	12
(Thailand) B Aimsaard (Thailand) N Aimsaard	22	21
(Thailand) P Chamnaktan (Thailand) N Chatupornkarnchana	11	18
2	(Indonesia) A S Awanda (Indonesia) N K M Istarani	21	21

Second Round
(Hong Kong) Ng W Y (Hong Kong) Yeung N T	15	18
6	(Australia) S Mapasa (Australia) G Somerville	21	21
(Thailand) B Aimsaard (Thailand) N Aimsaard	15	17
2	(Indonesia) A S Awanda (Indonesia) N K M Istarani	21	21

Quarterfinals
6	(Australia) S Mapasa (Australia) G Somerville	18	9
2	(Indonesia) A S Awanda (Indonesia) N K M Istarani	21	21

== Mixed doubles ==
=== Seeds ===
1. (Singapore) Terry Hee / Jessica Tan (withdrew)
2. (France) Ronan Labar / Audrey Fontaine (quarterfinals)
3. (Australia) Sawan Serasinghe / Setyana Mapasa (quarterfinals)
4. (Netherlands) Jacco Arends / Selena Piek (quarterfinals)
5. (Malaysia) Chan Peng Soon / Goh Liu Ying (champions)
6. (Russia) Vitalij Durkin / Nina Vislova (first round)
7. (Thailand) Dechapol Puavaranukroh / Puttita Supajirakul (final)
8. (Netherlands) Robin Tabeling / Cheryl Seinen (first round)

=== Finals ===
Semifinals
(Malaysia) Chen Tang Jie (Malaysia) Peck Yen Wei	19	13
7	(Thailand) Dechapol Puavaranukroh (Thailand) Puttita Supajirakul	21	21
5	(Malaysia) Chan Peng Soon (Malaysia) Goh Liu Ying	21	21
(Thailand) Nipitphon Phuangphuapet (Thailand) Jongkolphan Kititharakul	15	11

Final
7	(Thailand) Dechapol Puavaranukroh (Thailand) Puttita Supajirakul	15	21	16
5	(Malaysia) Chan Peng Soon (Malaysia) Goh Liu Ying	21	14	21

=== Top half ===
==== Section 1 ====
First Round
PFQ	(Indonesia) R N Kusharjanto (Indonesia) S F S Ramadhanti	16	21	21
(Malaysia) M A Abdul Latif (Indonesia) R A Riodingin	21	11	13
(Hong Kong) Tam C H (Hong Kong) Poon L Y	18	13
(Indonesia) A B Cahyono (Indonesia) W O Kandow	21	21
6	(Russia) V Durkin (Russia) N Vislova	15	16
(France) B Kersaudy (France) L Palermo	21	21
Q2	(Thailand) N Tulamok (Thailand) N Saengchote	21	14	11
(Malaysia) Chen T J (Malaysia) Peck Y W	13	21	21

Second Round
PFQ	(Indonesia) R N Kusharjanto (Indonesia) S F S Ramadhanti	17	14
(Indonesia) A B Cahyono (Indonesia) W O Kandow	21	21
(France) B Kersaudy (France) L Palermo	7	11
(Malaysia) Chen T J (Malaysia) Peck Y W	21	21

Quarterfinals
(Indonesia) A B Cahyono (Indonesia) W O Kandow	13	18
(Malaysia) Chen T J (Malaysia) Peck Y W	21	21

==== Section 2 ====
First Round
4	(Netherlands) J Arends (Netherlands) S Piek	21	21
Q1	(Thailand) P Thongnuam (Thailand) K Dubthuk	16	13
(Indonesia) K M Sugiarto (Indonesia) M D Giovani	13	11
(Thailand) T Isriyanet (Thailand) P Chochuwong	21	21
7	(Thailand) D Puavaranukroh (Thailand) P Supajirakul	14	21	21
(Hong Kong) Ho W L (Hong Kong) Yuen S Y	21	11	8
(Hong Kong) Yeung M N (Hong Kong) Ng T Y	21	21
(Indonesia) Y F Mainaky (Indonesia) L A Mainaky	10	14

Second Round
4	(Netherlands) J Arends (Netherlands) S Piek	21	21
(Thailand) T Isriyanet (Thailand) P Chochuwong	18	17
7	(Thailand) D Puavaranukroh (Thailand) P Supajirakul	20	21	21
(Hong Kong) Yeung M N (Hong Kong) Ng T Y	22	12	19

Quarterfinals
4	(Netherlands) J Arends (Netherlands) S Piek	16	14
7	(Thailand) D Puavaranukroh (Thailand) P Supajirakul	21	21

=== Bottom half ===
==== Section 3 ====
First Round
PFQ	(Sweden) R Eidestedt (Sweden) C Nistad	21	18	17
(Indonesia) Y E Saputra (Indonesia) M G Islami	19	21	21
(Hong Kong) Chang T C (Hong Kong) Ng W Y	19	15
5	(Malaysia) Chan P S (Malaysia) Goh L Y	21	21
(Indonesia) R Alexander (Indonesia) M C Bandaso	21	21
(France) J Maio (Sweden) A Högström	18	19
(Thailand) K Namdash (Thailand) S Amitrapai	13	17
3	(Australia) S Serasinghe (Australia) S Mapasa	21	21

Second Round
(Indonesia) Y E Saputra (Indonesia) M G Islami	14	19
5	(Malaysia) Chan P S (Malaysia) Goh L Y	21	21
(Indonesia) R Alexander (Indonesia) M C Bandaso	19	18
3	(Australia) S Serasinghe (Australia) S Mapasa	21	21

Quarterfinals
5	(Malaysia) Chan P S (Malaysia) Goh L Y	21	21
3	(Australia) S Serasinghe (Australia) S Mapasa	11	13

==== Section 4 ====
First Round
(Hong Kong) Mak H C (Hong Kong) Wu Y T	22	21
(India) V G Prasad (India) J Dewangan	20	17
(Thailand) N Phuangphuapet (Thailand) J Kititharakul	21	21	21
8	(Netherlands) R Tabeling (Netherlands) C Seinen	17	23	17
(Singapore) D B Chrisnanta (Singapore) C Wong	17	21	21
Q4	(Thailand) S Jomkoh (Thailand) K Sudjaipraparat	21	16	19
Q3	(Hong Kong) Yeung S C (Hong Kong) Yeung N T	17	11
2	(France) R Labar (France) A Fontaine	21	21

Second Round
(Hong Kong) Mak H C (Hong Kong) Wu Y T	11	15
(Thailand) N Phuangphuapet (Thailand) J Kititharakul	21	21
(Singapore) D B Chrisnanta (Singapore) C Wong	16	19
2	(France) R Labar (France) A Fontaine	21	21

Quarterfinals
(Thailand) N Phuangphuapet (Thailand) J Kititharakul	21	21
2	(France) R Labar (France) A Fontaine	18	15

Preceded by 2017 Korea Masters Grand Prix Gold	BWF World Tour; 2018 BWF season	Succeeded by 2018 Malaysia Masters
