= Jaspar Yu Woon Chai =

Bruneian badminton player (born 1988)

Yu Woon Chai 杨建财
Personal information
- Born: 14 November 1988 (age 37) Bandar Seri Begawan, Brunei
- Height: 167 cm (5 ft 6 in)
- Weight: 57 kg (126 lb)

Sport
- Country: Brunei
- Sport: Badminton
- Handedness: Right

Men's singles and doubles
- Highest ranking: 199 (MS 13 July 2017); 302 (MD 18 June 2019)
- Current ranking: 1005 (MS); 590
- BWF profile

Jaspar Yu Woon Chai
- Simplified Chinese: 杨建财
- Traditional Chinese: 楊建財
Transcriptions
Standard Mandarin
- Hanyu Pinyin: Yáng Jiàncái

Jaspar Yu Woon Chai (Chinese: 杨建财; pinyin: Yáng Jiàncái; born 14 November 1988) is a Bruneian badminton player. He achieved a career high ranking of 199 in the men's singles discipline.

It was announced in May 2016 that he was awarded the tripartite commission to compete in the men's singles event at the 2016 Summer Olympics in Rio de Janeiro, Brazil. Yu was the first badminton athlete from Brunei to compete at the Olympics.

== Education ==
Jaspar obtained his Bachelor of Arts (BA) with major in Geography and Development from the Universiti Brunei Darussalam (UBD).

== Career ==
Jaspar has made a few Superseries appearances at the international stage. In 2019, alongside his partner, they qualified to the main draw of the Badminton Asia Championships after winning the group tie in group B but lost to the eventual bronze medalists Kang Min-hyuk and Kim Won-ho in the first round.

He made his debut at the 2016 Summer Olympics.

2016 Summer Olympics – men's singles
Round	Opponent	Score	Result
RR	(Hong Kong) Hu Yun	16–21, 15–21	Lose
RR	(Spain) Pablo Abián	12–21, 10–21	Lose
