= Kittisak Namdash =

Thai badminton player (born 1995)

Personal information
- Born: 4 August 1995 (age 31) Nakhon Phanom, Thailand
- Height: 1.73 m (5 ft 8 in)

Sport
- Country: Thailand
- Sport: Badminton

Men's doubles
- Highest ranking: 20 (30 August 2018)
- BWF profile
Medal record
Men's badminton
Representing Thailand
SEA Games
Bronze medal – third place	2019 Philippines	Men's team
Summer Universiade
Bronze medal – third place	2017 Taipei	Mixed team

Kittisak Namdash (Thai: กิตติศักดิ์ นามเดช; born 4 August 1995) is a Thai badminton player. He was the boys' doubles champion at the Singapore Youth International tournament partnered with Peeranat Boontan. In 2013, he won double title at the Thailand Junior Championships in the boys' singles and doubles event. Namdash was part of the Thailand team that won the mixed team bronze medal at the 2017 Summer Universiade. He won his first senior international title at the 2018 Thailand Masters in the men's doubles event partnered with Tinn Isriyanet.

== Achievements ==
=== BWF World Tour (1 title, 1 runner-up) ===
The BWF World Tour, which was announced on 19 March 2017 and implemented in 2018, is a series of elite badminton tournaments sanctioned by the Badminton World Federation (BWF). The BWF World Tour is divided into levels of World Tour Finals, Super 1000, Super 750, Super 500, Super 300, and the BWF Tour Super 100.

Men's doubles
Year	Tournament	Level	Partner	Opponent	Score	Result
2018	Thailand Masters	Super 300	(Thailand) Tinn Isriyanet	(Indonesia) Wahyu Nayaka (Indonesia) Ade Yusuf	21–18, 11–21, 22–20	(gold) Winner
2018	Swiss Open	Super 300	(Thailand) Tinn Isriyanet	(Denmark) Mathias Boe (Denmark) Carsten Mogensen	15–21, 11–21	(silver) Runner-up

=== BWF International Challenge/Series (1 title, 1 runner-up) ===
Men's doubles
Year	Tournament	Partner	Opponent	Score	Result
2019	India International	(Thailand) Chaloempon Charoenkitamorn	(India) Manu Attri (India) B. Sumeeth Reddy	15–21, 15–21	(silver) Runner-up
2024	Egypt International	(Thailand) Samatcha Tovannakasem	(Algeria) Koceila Mammeri (Algeria) Youcef Sabri Medel	13–21, 21–18, 21–13	(gold) Winner

BWF International Challenge tournament
BWF International Series tournament
