= Tinn Isriyanet =

Thai badminton player (born 1993)

Personal information
- Nickname: Tinn
- Born: 7 July 1993 (age 33) Bangkok, Thailand
- Height: 1.79 m (5 ft 10 in)

Sport
- Country: Thailand
- Sport: Badminton
- Handedness: Right

Men's & mixed doubles
- Highest ranking: 20 (MD 28 August 2018); 38 (XD 31 May 2018)
- BWF profile
Medal record
Men's badminton
Representing Thailand
Sudirman Cup
Bronze medal – third place	2019 Nanning	Mixed team
Summer Universiade
Bronze medal – third place	2017 Taipei	Mixed team
Asian Junior Championships
Bronze medal – third place	2010 Kuala Lumpur	Mixed team

Tinn Isriyanet (Thai: ติณณ์ อิสริยะเนตร; born 7 July 1993) is a Thai badminton player. He was past of the Thailand team that won the mixed team bronze medal at the 2010 Asian Junior Badminton Championships. He won his first senior international title at the 2015 Smiling Fish International with Wannawat Ampunsuwan. In 2017, he won the mixed team bronze medal at the Summer Universiade. He won his first BWF world tour at the 2018 Thailand Masters in the men's doubles event partnered with Kittisak Namdash.

== Achievements ==
=== BWF World Tour ===
The BWF World Tour, which was announced on 19 March 2017 and implemented in 2018, is a series of elite badminton tournaments sanctioned by the Badminton World Federation (BWF). The BWF World Tour is divided into levels of World Tour Finals, Super 1000, Super 750, Super 500, Super 300, and the BWF Tour Super 100.

Men's doubles
Year	Tournament	Level	Partner	Opponent	Score	Result
2018	Thailand Masters	Super 300	(Thailand) Kittisak Namdash	(Indonesia) Wahyu Nayaka (Indonesia) Ade Yusuf	21–18, 11–21, 22–20	(gold) Winner
2018	Swiss Open	Super 300	(Thailand) Kittisak Namdash	(Denmark) Mathias Boe (Denmark) Carsten Mogensen	15–21, 11–21	(silver) Runner-up

=== BWF International Challenge/Series ===
Men's doubles
Year	Tournament	Partner	Opponent	Score	Result
2015	Smiling Fish International	(Thailand) Wannawat Ampunsuwan	(Indonesia) Yahya Adi Kumara (Indonesia) Yantoni Edy Saputra	26–24, 22–20	(gold) Winner
2015	Bahrain International	(Thailand) Wannawat Ampunsuwan	(Thailand) Bodin Isara (Thailand) Nipitphon Phuangphuapet	9–21, 14–21	(silver) Runner-up
2015	Tata Open India International	(Thailand) Wannawat Ampunsuwan	(India) Pranav Chopra (India) Akshay Dewalkar	21–14, 21–9	(gold) Winner

Mixed doubles
Year	Tournament	Partner	Opponent	Score	Result
2015	Singapore International	(Thailand) Savitree Amitrapai	(Indonesia) Hafiz Faizal (Indonesia) Shella Devi Aulia	14–21, 17–21	(silver) Runner-up
2016	Vietnam International	(Thailand) Pacharapun Chochuwong	(Japan) Yuta Watanabe (Japan) Arisa Higashino	16–21, 14–21	(silver) Runner-up

BWF International Challenge tournament
BWF International Series tournament
BWF Future Series tournament
