= 2018 Syed Modi International =

2018 badminton tournament in Lucknow, India

Tournament details
- Dates: 20–25 November
- Level: Super 300
- Total prize money: US$150,000
- Venue: Babu Banarasi Das Indoor Stadium
- Location: Lucknow, India

Champions
- Men's singles: (India) Sameer Verma
- Women's singles: (China) Han Yue
- Men's doubles: (Indonesia) Fajar Alfian (Indonesia) Muhammad Rian Ardianto
- Women's doubles: (Malaysia) Chow Mei Kuan (Malaysia) Lee Meng Yean
- Mixed doubles: (China) Ou Xuanyi (China) Feng Xueying

The 2018 Syed Modi International Badminton Championships was a badminton tournament which took place at the Babu Banarasi Das Indoor Stadium in Lucknow, India, from 20 to 25 November 2018 and had a total prize of $150,000.

== Tournament ==
The 2018 Syed Modi International was the twenty-fifth tournament of the 2018 BWF World Tour and also part of the Syed Modi International Badminton Championships, which had been held since 1991. This tournament was organized by Badminton Association of India and sanctioned by the BWF.

=== Venue ===
This international tournament was held at the Babu Banarasi Das Indoor Stadium in Lucknow, Uttar Pradesh, India.

=== Point distribution ===
Below is the point distribution table for each phase of the tournament based on the BWF points system for the BWF World Tour Super 300 event.

Winner	Runner-up	3/4	5/8	9/16	17/32	33/64	65/128
7,000	5,950	4,900	3,850	2,750	1,670	660	320

=== Prize money ===
The total prize money for this tournament was US$150,000. Distribution of prize money was in accordance with BWF regulations.

Event	Winner	Finals	Semi-finals	Quarter-finals	Last 16
Singles	$11,250	$5,700	$2,175	$900	$525
Doubles	$11,850	$5,700	$2,100	$1,087.50	$562.50

== Men's singles ==
=== Seeds ===
1. (India) Srikanth Kidambi (withdrew)
2. (India) Prannoy Kumar (first round)
3. (India) Sameer Verma (champion)
4. (India) B. Sai Praneeth (quarter-finals)
5. (Israel) Misha Zilberman (withdrew)
6. (China) Lu Guangzu (final)
7. (India) Sourabh Verma (first round)
8. (Thailand) Sitthikom Thammasin (semi-finals)

=== Finals ===
Semi-finals
8	(Thailand) Sitthikom Thammasin	21	16	17
6	(China) Lu Guangzu	10	21	21
3	(India) Sameer Verma	21	17	21
PFQ	(Indonesia) Chico Aura Dwi Wardoyo	13	21	8

Final
6	(China) Lu Guangzu	21	19	14
3	(India) Sameer Verma	16	21	21

=== Top half ===
==== Section 1 ====
First Round
PFQ	(India) S Thakur	13	8
(Indonesia) F A Kholik	21	21
(Thailand) T Saensomboonsuk	14	12
(India) Parupalli K	21	21
8	(Thailand) S Thammasin	21	21
Q2	(Malaysia) Tan J W	13	15
(Czech Republic) M Ludík	21	8	21
PFQ	(India) R Y Chittaboina	19	21	18

Second Round
(Indonesia) F A Kholik	21	20	8
(India) Parupalli K	9	22	21
8	(Thailand) S Thammasin	21	21
(Czech Republic) M Ludík	7	9

Quarter-finals
(India) Parupalli K	16	19
8	(Thailand) S Thammasin	21	21

==== Section 2 ====
First Round
4	(India) B. Sai Praneeth	21	21
(Russia) S Sirant	12	10
(India) S Pratap Singh	12	14
(Indonesia) S H Rhustavito	21	21
6	(China) Lu GZ	21	21	21
(India) S Jaiswal	13	23	19
(India) S Dey	21	21
(Sweden) F Burestedt	15	13

Second Round
4	(India) B. Sai Praneeth	21	21
(Indonesia) S H Rhustavito	12	10
6	(China) Lu GZ	21	21
(India) S Dey	13	10

Quarter-finals
4	(India) B. Sai Praneeth	10	21	14
6	(China) Lu GZ	21	19	21

=== Bottom half ===
==== Section 3 ====
First Round
(India) A Jayaram	21	13	9
Q4	(India) H Dani	13	21	21
(China) Zhou ZQ	13	21	21
7	(India) So Verma	21	15	15
(Mauritius) J Paul	22	23	13
(China) Zhao JP	20	25	21
Q1	(India) Si Verma	12	17
(India) Sa Verma	21	21

Second Round
Q4	(India) H Dani	14	20
(China) Zhou ZQ	21	22
(China) Zhao JP	20	17
3	(India) Sa Verma	22	21

Quarter-finals
(China) Zhou ZQ	18	21	11
3	(India) Sa Verma	21	16	21

==== Section 4 ====
First Round
(Germany) J Persson	11	15
(India) G Dutt	21	21
Q3	(Indonesia) V A Saputra	21	20	21
PFQ	(India) K Gulshan Kumar	11	22	4
(Indonesia) P A Maulana	17	21	19
(India) M Manjunath	21	14	21
PFQ	(Indonesia) C A Dwi Wardoyo	21	21
2	(India) Prannoy H. S.	14	7

Second Round
(India) G Dutt	10	21	14
Q3	(Indonesia) V A Saputra	21	7	21
(India) M Manjunath	9	19
PFQ	(Indonesia) C A Dwi Wardoyo	21	21

Quarter-finals
Q3	(Indonesia) V A Saputra	17	19
PFQ	(Indonesia) C A Dwi Wardoyo	21	21

== Women's singles ==
=== Seeds ===
1. (India) P. V. Sindhu (withdrew)
2. (India) Saina Nehwal (final)
3. (Japan) Sayaka Takahashi (withdrew)
4. (China) Han Yue (champion)
5. (China) Zhang Yiman (quarter-finals)
6. (Indonesia) Dinar Dyah Ayustine (quarter-finals)
7. (China) Li Xuerui (semi-finals)
8. (India) Rituparna Das (quarter-finals)

=== Finals ===
Semi-finals
7	(China) Li Xuerui	15	21	9
4	(China) Han Yue	21	19	21
(Indonesia) Ruselli Hartawan	21	7	6
2	(India) Saina Nehwal	12	21	21

Final
4	(China) Han Yue	21	21
2	(India) Saina Nehwal	18	8

=== Top half ===
==== Section 1 ====
First Round
PFQ	(India) R Karthik	21	21
(India) M Agrey	12	18
(India) S U R Chukka	21	21
(Israel) K Polikarpova	19	19
7	(China) Li XR	21	21
(India) S Toshniwal	13	10
(India) Shreyanshi P	21	21
(Egypt) H Hosny	6	14

Second Round
PFQ	(India) R Karthik	12	15
(India) S U R Chukka	21	21
7	(China) Li XR	21	21
(India) Shreyanshi P	19	16

Quarter-finals
(India) S U R Chukka	9	21	12
7	(China) Li XR	21	19	21

==== Section 2 ====
First Round
4	(China) Han Y	21	21
(India) S Gautam	7	8
Q2	(India) T Mamilla Palli	21	21
(India) R Raje	17	16
6	(Indonesia) D D Ayustine	21	21
(India) A Kashyap	16	17
(India) S Rane	21	21
(Egypt) D Hany	15	15

Second Round
4	(China) Han Y	21	21
Q2	(India) T Mamilla Palli	10	9
6	(Indonesia) D D Ayustine	21	21
(India) S Rane	14	6

Quarter-finals
4	(China) Han Y	21	21
6	(Indonesia) D D Ayustine	13	14

=== Bottom half ===
==== Section 3 ====
First Round
Q3	(India) R Thaker	15	17
(India) R Mookerjee	21	21
(India) V Gummadi	12	9
5	(China) Zhang YM	21	21
(Indonesia) R Hartawan	21	21
(India) V Choudhari	17	19
(India) S K P Kudaravalli	6^{r}
PFQ	(India) P Joshi	3

Second Round
(India) R Mookerjee	12	8
5	(China) Zhang YM	21	21
(Indonesia) R Hartawan	21	21
PFQ	(India) P Joshi	16	18

Quarter-finals
5	(China) Zhang YM	21	21	11
(Indonesia) R Hartawan	23	11	21

==== Section 4 ====
First Round
(India) I Sharma	10	12
Q4	(India) S Mundada	21	21
(Russia) N Perminova	19	21	10
8	(India) R Das	21	18	21
Q1	(India) A S Sisodiya	21	12	21
(India) A Prabhudesai	18	21	18
(Mauritius) K Foo Kune	10	10
2	(India) S Nehwal	21	21

Second Round
Q4	(India) S Mundada	11	15
8	(India) R Das	21	21
Q1	(India) A S Sisodiya	14	9
2	(India) S Nehwal	21	21

Quarter-finals
8	(India) R Das	19	14
2	(India) S Nehwal	21	21

== Men's doubles ==
=== Seeds ===
1. (Denmark) Kim Astrup / Anders Skaarup Rasmussen (first round)
2. (Indonesia) Fajar Alfian / Muhammad Rian Ardianto (champions)
3. (Japan) Takuto Inoue / Yuki Kaneko (withdrew)
4. (Japan) Hiroyuki Endo / Yuta Watanabe (first round)
5. (Denmark) Mathias Boe / Carsten Mogensen (semi-finals)
6. (China) Han Chengkai / Zhou Haodong (quarter-finals)
7. (Russia) Vladimir Ivanov / Ivan Sozonov (semi-finals)
8. (India) Satwiksairaj Rankireddy / Chirag Shetty (final)

=== Finals ===
Semi-finals
8	(India) Satwiksairaj Rankireddy (India) Chirag Shetty	22	25
5	(Denmark) Mathias Boe (Denmark) Carsten Mogensen	20	23
7	(Russia) Vladimir Ivanov (Russia) Ivan Sozonov	14	25
2	(Indonesia) Fajar Alfian (Indonesia) Muhammad Rian Ardianto	21	27

Final
8	(India) Satwiksairaj Rankireddy (India) Chirag Shetty	11	20
2	(Indonesia) Fajar Alfian (Indonesia) Muhammad Rian Ardianto	21	22

=== Top half ===
==== Section 1 ====
First Round
1	(Denmark) K Astrup (Denmark) A S Rasmussen	1^{r}
(China) Ou XY (China) Ren XY	6
(India) R Kapoor (India) S Sharma	24	17
(Malaysia) Shia C K (Malaysia) Tan W G	26	21
8	(India) S Rankireddy (India) C Shetty	21	21
(Thailand) I Apisuk (Thailand) N Phuangphuapet	13	14
Q1	(India) S Sharma (India) H Thandarang	21	21
(India) A George (India) S Shukla	13	19

Second Round
(China) Ou XY (China) Ren XY	21	21
(Malaysia) Shia C K (Malaysia) Tan W G	18	12
8	(India) S Rankireddy (India) C Shetty	21	21
Q1	(India) S Sharma (India) H Thandarang	15	10

Quarter-finals
(China) Ou XY (China) Ren XY	21	19	17
8	(India) S Rankireddy (India) C Shetty	15	21	21

==== Section 2 ====
First Round
4	(Japan) H Endo (Japan) Y Watanabe	11	9
PFQ	(Russia) D Grachev (Russia) P Kotsarenko	21	21
Q3	(India) S Malik (India) P Nathani	11	13
(South Korea) Kim G-j (South Korea) Lee Y-d	21	21
5	(Denmark) M Boe (Denmark) C Mogensen	21	21
(India) B Chakraborty (India) P Chaturvedi	6	3
(India) U Arora (India) S Bora	21	21
(Australia) S Leung (Australia) M Wheller	11	15

Second Round
(Russia) D Grachev (Russia) P Kotsarenko	7	14
(South Korea) Kim G-j (South Korea) Lee Y-d	21	21
5	(Denmark) M Boe (Denmark) C Mogensen	21	21
(India) U Arora (India) S Bora	18	5

Quarter-finals
(South Korea) Kim G-j (South Korea) Lee Y-d	15	19
5	(Denmark) M Boe (Denmark) C Mogensen	21	21

=== Bottom half ===
==== Section 3 ====
First Round
(India) K P Garaga (India) D Kapila	21	21	21
(India) T Kona (Malaysia) Lim K W	13	23	14
(India) V Hanumaiah (India) A Surya	13	21	11
7	(Russia) V Ivanov (Russia) I Sozonov	21	18	21
(India) S Jakhar (India) R Raturi	7	11
(Indonesia) S K Gutama (Indonesia) F W Putra	21	21
(India) Arjun M. R. (India) R Shlok	w	/	o
PFQ	(India) A R Mandiraju (India) V G Prasad

Second Round
(India) K P Garaga (India) D Kapila	21	18	13
7	(Russia) V Ivanov (Russia) I Sozonov	19	21	21
(Indonesia) S K Gutama (Indonesia) F W Putra	21	21
(India) Arjun M. R. (India) R Shlok	12	14

Quarter-finals
7	(Russia) V Ivanov (Russia) I Sozonov	21	21
(Indonesia) S K Gutama (Indonesia) F W Putra	19	17

==== Section 4 ====
First Round
(Thailand) T Isriyanet (Thailand) T Viriyangkura	21	21
(India) G Deswal (India) A Ola	7	9
(India) K Chaudhary (India) B Yadav	8	10
6	(China) Han CK (China) Zhou HD	21	21
Q2	(China) Huang KX (China) Wang ZK	21	21
Q4	(India) V Chawat (India) M Tiwari	12	15
(Russia) R Alimov (Russia) E Dremin	21	21	14
2	(Indonesia) F Alfian (Indonesia) M R Ardianto	23	19	21

Second Round
(Thailand) T Isriyanet (Thailand) T Viriyangkura	10	17
6	(China) Han CK (China) Zhou HD	21	21
Q2	(China) Huang KX (China) Wang ZK	14	12
2	(Indonesia) F Alfian (Indonesia) M R Ardianto	21	21

Quarter-finals
6	(China) Han CK (China) Zhou HD	16	9
2	(Indonesia) F Alfian (Indonesia) M R Ardianto	21	21

== Women's doubles ==
=== Seeds ===
1. (Japan) Misaki Matsutomo / Ayaka Takahashi (first round)
2. (Indonesia) Della Destiara Haris / Rizki Amelia Pradipta (semi-finals)
3. (Malaysia) Chow Mei Kuan / Lee Meng Yean (champions)
4. (India) Ashwini Ponnappa / N. Sikki Reddy (final)
5. (Russia) Ekaterina Bolotova / Alina Davletova (semi-finals)
6. (Malaysia) Vivian Hoo / Yap Cheng Wen (second round)
7. (India) Meghana Jakkampudi / Poorvisha S. Ram (first round)
8. (Indonesia) Ni Ketut Mahadewi Istirani / Virni Putri (second round)

=== Finals ===
Semi-finals
5	(Russia) Ekaterina Bolotova (Russia) Alina Davletova	18	16
4	(India) Ashwini Ponnappa (India) N. Sikki Reddy	21	21
3	(Malaysia) Chow Mei Kuan (Malaysia) Lee Meng Yean	14	21	16
2	(Indonesia) Della Destiara Haris (Indonesia) Rizki Amelia Pradipta	21	19	9^{r}

Final
4	(India) Ashwini Ponnappa (India) N. Sikki Reddy	15	13
3	(Malaysia) Chow Mei Kuan (Malaysia) Lee Meng Yean	21	21

=== Top half ===
==== Section 1 ====
First Round
1	(Japan) M Matsutomo (Japan) A Takahashi	5^{r}
(India) S Christian (India) R Gajjar	3
Q4	(India) D Choudhary (India) M Yadav	16	7
(India) K Garg (India) N B Hazarika	21	21
5	(Russia) E Bolotova (Russia) A Davletova	21	21
(India) A Roy (India) S Santhilal	10	11
Q1	(India) V V. Belawdi (India) L L Rachapalli	19	21	21
(India) S Saikia (India) M Sinha	21	17	14

Second Round
(India) S Christian (India) R Gajjar
(India) K Garg (India) N B Hazarika	w	/	o
5	(Russia) E Bolotova (Russia) A Davletova	21	21
Q1	(India) V V Belawdi (India) L L Rachapalli	11	14

Quarter-finals
(India) K Garg (India) N B Hazarika	6	14
5	(Russia) E Bolotova (Russia) A Davletova	21	21

==== Section 2 ====
First Round
4	(India) A Ponnappa (India) N. S Reddy	21	21
(India) A Balan (India) Sruthi K. P.	8	19
(India) A Kaushik (India) K Prasad	7	5
Q2	(India) P Konadam (India) P Konjengbam	21	21
7	(India) M Jakkampudi (India) P S. Ram	12	21	20
(Indonesia) T O Kusumah (Indonesia) V A Sukoco	21	8	22
(India) A Agna (India) P Sawant	21	21
(Egypt) D Hany (Egypt) H Hosny	9	11

Second Round
4	(India) A Ponnappa (India) N. S Reddy	21	21
Q2	(India) P Konadam (India) P Konjengbam	14	13
(Indonesia) T O Kusumah (Indonesia) V A Sukoco	21	21
(India) A Agna (India) P Sawant	11	13

Quarter-finals
4	(India) A Ponnappa (India) N. S Reddy	19	21	21
(Indonesia) T O Kusumah (Indonesia) V A Sukoco	21	8	18

=== Bottom half ===
==== Section 3 ====
First Round
(India) M Aggarwal (India) K Wadkar	12	12
(Indonesia) Y Barkah (Indonesia) J F Sugiarto	21	21
(India) P Dandu (India) S Santosh	21	14	15
8	(Indonesia) N K M Istirani (Indonesia) V Putri	19	21	21
Q3	(India) S Mishra (India) S Singh	21	18	21
(India) K Sawant (India) A Warang	7	21	14
(India) D Hazarika (India) P Naqvi	3	3
3	(Malaysia) Chow M K (Malaysia) Lee M Y	21	21

Second Round
(Indonesia) Y Barkah (Indonesia) J F Sugiarto	16	21	21
8	(Indonesia) N K M Istirani (Indonesia) V Putri	21	15	18
Q3	(India) S Mishra (India) S Singh	7	5
3	(Malaysia) Chow M K (Malaysia) Lee M Y	21	21

Quarter-finals
(Indonesia) Y Barkah (Indonesia) J F Sugiarto	15	15
3	(Malaysia) Chow M K (Malaysia) Lee M Y	21	21

==== Section 4 ====
First Round
(China) Chen L (China) Xu Y	21	21
(India) R Panda (India) A S Sunil	4	7
(India) S Singhi (India) R Thaker	11	10
6	(Malaysia) V Hoo (Malaysia) Yap C W	21	21
(China) Dong WJ (China) Feng XY	21	21
(India) S Chowdhary (India) A Goel	8	8
(India) A Nayak (India) T Samantaray	7	6
2	(Indonesia) D D Haris (Indonesia) R A Pradipta	21	21

Second Round
(China) Chen L (China) Xu Y	21	24	21
6	(Malaysia) V Hoo (Malaysia) Yap C W	15	26	19
(China) Dong WJ (China) Feng XY	9	13
2	(Indonesia) D D Haris (Indonesia) R A Pradipta	21	21

Quarter-finals
(China) Chen L (China) Xu Y	15	12
2	(Indonesia) D D Haris (Indonesia) R A Pradipta	21	21

== Mixed doubles ==
=== Seeds ===
1. (India) Pranav Chopra / N. Sikki Reddy (first round)
2. (Russia) Evgenij Dremin / Evgenia Dimova (second round)
3. (Malaysia) Chen Tang Jie / Peck Yen Wei (withdrew)
4. (Indonesia) Rinov Rivaldy / Pitha Haningtyas Mentari (final)
5. (Indonesia) Alfian Eko Prasetya / Marsheilla Gischa Islami (semi-finals)
6. (India) Satwiksairaj Rankireddy / Ashwini Ponnappa (semi-finals)
7. (Thailand) Nipitphon Phuangphuapet / Savitree Amitrapai (quarter-finals)
8. (Indonesia) Tontowi Ahmad / Della Destiara Haris (withdrew)

=== Finals ===
Semi-finals
5	(Indonesia) Alfian Eko Prasetya (Indonesia) Marsheilla Gischa Islami	21	13	14
4	(Indonesia) Rinov Rivaldy (Indonesia) Pitha Haningtyas Mentari	7	21	21
6	(India) Satwiksairaj Rankireddy (India) Ashwini Ponnappa	12	21	19
(China) Ou Xuanyi (China) Feng Xueying	21	18	21

Final
4	(Indonesia) Rinov Rivaldy (Indonesia) Pitha Haningtyas Mentari	20	10
(China) Ou Xuanyi (China) Feng Xueying	22	21

=== Top half ===
==== Section 1 ====
First Round
1	(India) P Chopra (India) N. S Reddy	14	11
(China) Ren XY (China) Zhou CM	21	21
(India) S Jakhar (India) S Saikia	7	4
(China) Lu K (China) Chen L	21	21
5	(Indonesia) A E Prasetya (Indonesia) M G Islami	21	21
PFQ	(India) A Saxena (India) Y Taring	6	7
(India) S Sharma (India) A Parikh	24	21
Q1	(India) A Surya (India) P Prabhu	22	8

Second Round
(China) Ren XY (China) Zhou CM	22	21
(China) Lu K (China) Chen L	20	10
5	(Indonesia) A E Prasetya (Indonesia) M G Islami	21	21
(India) S Sharma (India) A Parikh	11	11

Quarter-finals
(China) Ren XY (China) Zhou CM	21	18	12
5	(Indonesia) A E Prasetya (Indonesia) M G Islami	19	21	21

==== Section 2 ====
First Round
4	(Indonesia) R Rivaldy (Indonesia) P H Mentari	21	21
(China) Dong WeiJ (China) Dong WenJ	10	9
Q3	(India) D Kapila (India) M Jakkampudi	21	21
(India) S Shukla (India) P Sawant	17	9
PFQ	(India) B. S Reddy (India) P Dandu	21	21
(India) V G Prasad (India) J Dewangan	13	9
(Russia) D Grachev (Russia) E Bolotova	13	22	17
(India) R Kapoor (India) K Garg	21	20	21

Second Round
4	(Indonesia) R Rivaldy (Indonesia) P H Mentari	21	18	21
Q3	(India) D Kapila (India) M Jakkampudi	19	21	15
PFQ	(India) B. S Reddy (India) P Dandu	21	17	21
(India) R Kapoor (India) K Garg	10	21	10

Quarter-finals
4	(Indonesia) R Rivaldy (Indonesia) P H Mentari	21	16	21
PFQ	(India) B. S Reddy (India) P Dandu	18	21	19

=== Bottom half ===
==== Section 3 ====
First Round
PFQ	(India) T Sharma (India) D Choudhary	11	15
(India) S Sharma (India) P S. Ram	21	21
Q4	(India) K P Garaga (India) R Panda	10	10
6	(India) S Rankireddy (India) A Ponnappa	21	21
(Indonesia) R Alexander (Indonesia) A Saufika	21	21
(India) U Arora (India) K Wadkar	14	16
Q2	(India) A Singh (India) S Mishra	10	9
PFQ	(India) Arjun M. R. (India) K. Maneesha	21	21

Second Round
(India) S Sharma (India) P S. Ram	21	14	15
6	(India) S Rankireddy (India) A Ponnappa	12	21	21
(Indonesia) R Alexander (Indonesia) A Saufika	21	21
PFQ	(India) Arjun M. R. (India) K. Maneesha	7	16

Quarter-finals
6	(India) S Rankireddy (India) A Ponnappa	20	21	21
(Indonesia) R Alexander (Indonesia) A Saufika	22	17	11

==== Section 4 ====
First Round
(India) H Tiwari (India) A Kashyap	11	8
(Russia) R Alimov (Russia) A Davletova	21	21
(India) S. Sunjith Jr. (India) Sruthi K. P.	5	16
7	(Thailand) N Phuangphuapet (Thailand) S Amitrapai	21	21
(India) V Devlekar (India) H Veludurthi	21	15	10
(China) Ou XY (China) Feng XY	19	21	21
(India) G Deswal (India) T Samantaray	9	12
2	(Russia) E Dremin (Russia) E Dimova	21	21

Second Round
(Russia) R Alimov (Russia) A Davletova	14	17
7	(Thailand) N Phuangphuapet (Thailand) S Amitrapai	21	21
(China) Ou XY (China) Feng XY	16	21	21
2	(Russia) E Dremin (Russia) E Dimova	21	17	19

Quarter-finals
7	(Thailand) N Phuangphuapet (Thailand) S Amitrapai	16	12
(China) Ou XY (China) Feng XY	21	21

Preceded by 2018 Hong Kong Open	BWF World Tour; 2018 BWF season	Succeeded by 2018 Scottish Open
