= 2017 China Masters Grand Prix Gold =

Tournament details
- Dates: 18 – 23 April 2017
- Level: Grand Prix Gold
- Total prize money: US$150,000
- Venue: Olympic Sports Center Xincheng Gymnasium
- Location: Changzhou, Jiangsu, China

Champions
- Men's singles: (China) Tian Houwei
- Women's singles: (Japan) Aya Ohori
- Men's doubles: (Chinese Taipei) Chen Hung-ling (Chinese Taipei) Wang Chi-lin
- Women's doubles: (China) Bao Yixin (China) Yu Xiaohan
- Mixed doubles: (China) Wang Yilü (China) Huang Dongping

The 2017 China Masters was a badminton tournament that took place at the Olympic Sports Center Xincheng Gymnasium in Changzhou, Jiangsu, China on 18–23 April 2017 and had a total purse of $150,000.

== Tournament ==
The 2017 China Masters was the sixth tournament of the 2017 BWF Grand Prix Gold and Grand Prix and also part of the China Masters championships, which had been held since 2005. This tournament was organized by Chinese Badminton Association and sanctioned by the BWF.

=== Venue ===
This international tournament was held at the Changzhou Olympic Sports Centre in Changzhou, China.

=== Prize money ===
The total prize money for this tournament was US$150,000. Distribution of prize money was in accordance with BWF regulations.

Event	Winner	Finals	Semifinals	Quarterfinals	Last 16
Singles	$11,250	$5,700	$2,175	$900	$525
Doubles	$11,850	$5,700	$2,100	$1087.50	$562.50

== Men's singles ==
=== Seeds ===
1. (China) Lin Dan (semifinals)
2. (China) Tian Houwei (champion)
3. (China) Qiao Bin (final)
4. (China) Huang Yuxiang (semifinals)
5. (Chinese Taipei) Hsu Jen-hao (quarterfinals)
6. (Japan) Kanta Tsuneyama (quarterfinals)
7. (Chinese Taipei) Lin Yu-hsien (second round)
8. (China) Zhao Junpeng (second round)

=== Finals ===
Quarterfinals
1	(China) Lin Dan	21	21
5	(Chinese Taipei) Hsu Jen-hao	14	17
3	(China) Qiao Bin	21	22
6	(Japan) Kanta Tsuneyama	16	20
(China) Sun Feixiang	11	18
4	(China) Huang Yuxiang	21	21
(Chinese Taipei) Hsueh Hsuan-yi	10	11
2	(China) Tian Houwei	21	21

Semifinals
1	(China) Lin Dan	16	21	14
3	(China) Qiao Bin	21	15	21
4	(China) Huang Yuxiang	18	21	6
2	(China) Tian Houwei	21	17	21

Final
3	(China) Qiao Bin	15	21	16
2	(China) Tian Houwei	21	15	21

=== Top half ===
==== Section 1 ====
First Round
1	(China) Lin D
BYE
(Malaysia) Jimmy Tay Y L	15	12
(Chile) Q Zheng	21	21
(Brunei) Jaspar Yu W C
BYE
(China) Zhou ZQ	21	11	21
(Indonesia) M B Pangisthu	17	21	19

Second Round
1	(China) Lin D	21	21
(Chile) Q Zheng	15	11
(Brunei) Jaspar Yu W C	11	14
(China) Zhou ZQ	21	21

Third Round
1	(China) Lin D	21	21
(China) Zhou ZQ	14	14

==== Section 2 ====
First Round
5	(Chinese Taipei) Hsu J-h
BYE
(Japan) K Naraoka	20	11
(Malaysia) Soong J V	22	21
(England) Y Wang	11	15
(China) Gu JF	21	21
(Indonesia) A Marteen	19	15
(Chinese Taipei) Chen C-t	21	21

Second Round
5	(Chinese Taipei) Hsu J-h	22	17	21
(Malaysia) Soong J V	20	21	19
(China) Gu JF	21	21
(Chinese Taipei) Chen C-t	14	12

Third Round
5	(Chinese Taipei) Hsu J-h	21	21
(China) Gu JF	12	12

==== Section 3 ====
First Round
3	(China) Qiao B
BYE
(Chinese Taipei) Chang E-c	w	/	o
(Indonesia) F I Hadmadi
(India) K Parupalli
BYE
(Thailand) S Avihingsanon	21	18	21
(China) Bai YP	11	21	11

Second Round
3	(China) Qiao B	21	21
(Chinese Taipei) Chang E-c	11	16
(India) K Parupalli	21	21
(Thailand) S Avihingsanon	16	17

Third Round
3	(China) Qiao B	21	20	21
(India) K Parupalli	10	22	13

==== Section 4 ====
First Round
6	(Japan) K Tsuneyama
BYE
(Japan) Y Igarashi	21	18	21
(China) Liu HC	12	21	16
(United States) Y T Chan	9	13
(China) Ye BH	21	21
(Thailand) K Wangcharoen	21	21
(Canada) T Chiu	13	12

Second Round
6	(Japan) K Tsuneyama	21	21
(Japan) Y Igarashi	14	16
(China) Ye BH	23	21
(Thailand) K Wangcharoen	21	12

Third Round
6	(Japan) K Tsuneyama	15	21	21
(China) Ye BH	21	14	16

=== Bottom half ===
==== Section 5 ====
First Round
(India) H Dani	21	21
(Chinese Taipei) Chen C-w	17	18
(South Africa) J Maliekal	18	15
(China) Yan RZ	21	21
(China) Sun FX	21	21
(Indonesia) P A Maulana	15	16
BYE
7	(Chinese Taipei) Lin Y-h

Second Round
(India) H Dani	21	22
(China) Yan RZ	16	20
(China) Sun FX	21	21
7	(Chinese Taipei) Lin Y-h	16	16

Third Round
(India) H Dani	17	18
(China) Sun FX	21	21

==== Section 6 ====
First Round
(Indonesia) F A Kholik	13	21	21
(China) Ren PB	21	13	18
(Indonesia) K A Nugraha	18	21
(Chinese Taipei) Lin C-h	21	23
(China) Weng HY	19	21	15
(Japan) H Shimono	21	9	21
BYE
4	(China) Huang YX

Second Round
(Indonesia) F A Kholik	17	21	19
(Chinese Taipei) Lin C-h	21	14	21
(Japan) H Shimono	16	19
4	(China) Huang YX	21	21

Third Round
(Chinese Taipei) Lin C-h	27	17
4	(China) Huang YX	29	21

==== Section 7 ====
First Round
(Japan) Y Onodera	21	19	21
(Malaysia) Lim C W	17	21	15
(Thailand) K Phetpradab
(Chinese Taipei) Hsueh H-y	w	/	o
(China) Zhu SY	21	21
(England) K H Tang	9	8
BYE
8	(China) Zhao JP

Second Round
(Japan) Y Onodera	16	12
(Chinese Taipei) Hsueh H-y	21	21
(China) Zhu SY	21	15	21
8	(China) Zhao JP	19	21	17

Third Round
(Chinese Taipei) Hsueh H-y	8	21	21
(China) Zhu SY	21	11	17

==== Section 8 ====
First Round
(Thailand) A Namkul	10	15
(China) Lu GZ	21	21
BYE
(Chinese Taipei) Yang C-c
(Malaysia) Liew D
(China) Guo K	w	/	o
BYE
2	(China) Tian HW

Second Round
(China) Lu GZ	18	21	21
(Chinese Taipei) Yang C-c	21	12	13
(China) Guo K	18	15
2	(China) Tian HW	21	21

Third Round
(China) Lu GZ	17	13
2	(China) Tian HW	21	21

== Women's singles ==
=== Seeds ===
1. (China) Chen Yufei (quarterfinals)
2. (Japan) Aya Ohori (champion)
3. (Japan) Ayumi Mine (first round)
4. (Chinese Taipei) Lee Chia-hsin (first round)
5. (Japan) Saena Kawakami (final)
6. (Chinese Taipei) Sung Shuo-yun (first round)
7. (Chinese Taipei) Chen Su-yu (first round)
8. (China) Gao Fangjie (semifinals)

=== Finals ===
Semifinals
5	(Japan) Saena Kawakami	18	21	21
(China) Cai Yanyan	21	11	8
8	(China) Gao Fangjie	17	13
2	(Japan) Aya Ohori	21	21

Final
5	(Japan) Saena Kawakami	9	21	18
2	(Japan) Aya Ohori	21	9	21

=== Top half ===
==== Section 1 ====
First Round
1	(China) Chen YF	21	21
(Japan) H Suzuki	11	17
(Japan) S Takahashi	21	21
Q4	(China) Lyu YF	13	8
5	(Japan) S Kawakami	21	22
(Chinese Taipei) Hu L-f	15	20
Q1	BYE
Q2	(Chinese Taipei) Peng L-t

Second Round
1	(China) Chen YF	21	21
(Japan) S Takahashi	10	18
5	(Japan) S Kawakami	21	21
Q2	(Chinese Taipei) Peng L-t	8	11

Quarterfinals
1	(China) Chen YF	21	20	18
5	(Japan) S Kawakami	19	22	21

==== Section 2 ====
First Round
3	(Japan) A Mine	21	17	18
(Chinese Taipei) Hung Y-t	9	21	21
(China) Li WM	21	13	21
(India) S U Chukka	4	21	12
6	(Chinese Taipei) Sung S-y	17	12
(China) Cai YY	21	21
(United States) C Pan	16	8
(Chinese Taipei) Tang W-y	21	21

Second Round
(Chinese Taipei) Hung Y-t	10	19
(China) Li WM	21	21
(China) Cai YY	21	21
(Chinese Taipei) Tang W-y	8	11

Quarterfinals
(China) Li WM	17	21	25
(China) Cai YY	21	16	27

=== Bottom half ===
==== Section 3 ====
First Round
(India) S K Kudaravalli	18	11
(China) Li Y	21	21
(Chinese Taipei) Chen H-h	16	15
8	(China) Gao FJ	21	21
(Japan) S Saito	21	16	11
(China) Han Y	17	21	21
(China) Hui XR	24	22
4	(Chinese Taipei) Lee C-h	22	20

Second Round
(China) Li Y	21	15	7
8	(China) Gao FJ	18	21	21
(China) Han Y	11	21	21
(China) Hui XR	21	12	16

Quarterfinals
8	(China) Gao FJ	21	21
(China) Han Y	13	11

==== Section 4 ====
First Round
(China) Peng Q	17	21	9
Q3	(China) Wei YX	21	12	21
(China) Zhang YM	21	21
7	(Chinese Taipei) Chen S-y	8	11
(China) Ji ST	21	21
(Chinese Taipei) Liang T-y	12	15
PFQ	(China) Wang ZY	15	19
2	(Japan) A Ohori	21	21

Second Round
Q3	(China) Wei YX	17	25	16
(China) Zhang YM	21	23	21
(China) Ji ST	16	15
2	(Japan) A Ohori	21	21

Quarterfinals
(China) Zhang YM	15	20
2	(Japan) A Ohori	21	22

== Men's doubles ==
=== Seeds ===
1. (Chinese Taipei) Chen Hung-ling / Wang Chi-lin (champion)
2. (China) Huang Kaixiang / Wang Yilü (quarterfinals)
3. (Chinese Taipei) Lu Ching-yao / Yang Po-han (second round)
4. (China) Liu Cheng / Zhang Nan (quarterfinals)
5. (Japan) Takuto Inoue / Yuki Kaneko (final)
6. (Indonesia) Berry Angriawan / Hardianto (semifinals)
7. (Malaysia) Chooi Kah Ming / Low Juan Shen (quarterfinals)
8. (Chinese Taipei) Liao Kuan-hao / Lu Chia-pin (first round)

=== Finals ===
Semifinals
1	(Chinese Taipei) Chen Hung-ling (Chinese Taipei) Wang Chi-lin	21	13	21
(Indonesia) Hendra Setiawan (Malaysia) Tan Boon Heong	14	21	18
5	(Japan) Takuto Inoue (Japan) Yuki Kaneko	21	21
6	(Indonesia) Berry Angriawan (Indonesia) Hardianto	9	13

Final
1	(Chinese Taipei) Chen Hung-ling (Chinese Taipei) Wang Chi-lin	21	21
5	(Japan) Takuto Inoue (Japan) Yuki Kaneko	14	6

=== Top half ===
==== Section 1 ====
First Round
1	(Chinese Taipei) Chen H-l (Chinese Taipei) Wang C-l	21	21
(China) Han CK (China) Zhou HD	15	12
(China) Kang J (China) Zhang SJ	11	19
(Chinese Taipei) Lee C-h (Chinese Taipei) Tsai C-h	21	21
7	(Malaysia) Chooi K M (Malaysia) Low J S	21	21
(Japan) K Gondo (Japan) T Watanabe	15	18
(Chinese Taipei) Lin S-k (Chinese Taipei) Yang P-h	21	21
(Indonesia) S K Gutama (Indonesia) F W Putra	18	18

Second Round
1	(Chinese Taipei) Chen H-l (Chinese Taipei) Wang C-l	21	23
(Chinese Taipei) Lee C-h (Chinese Taipei) Tsai C-h	15	21
7	(Malaysia) Chooi K M (Malaysia) Low J S	21	21
(Chinese Taipei) Lin S-k (Chinese Taipei) Yang P-h	11	18

Quarterfinals
1	(Chinese Taipei) Chen H-l (Chinese Taipei) Wang C-l	21	21
7	(Malaysia) Chooi K M (Malaysia) Low J S	19	17

==== Section 2 ====
First Round
4	(China) Liu C (China) Zhang N	21	21
(Indonesia) K A Haryanto (Indonesia) M R P Isfahani	15	18
(China) Liu XL (China) Zhang W
(Chinese Taipei) Lee F-c (Chinese Taipei) Lee F-j	w	/	o
8	(Chinese Taipei) Liao K-h (Chinese Taipei) Lu C-p	16	21	12
(Indonesia) H Setiawan (Malaysia) Tan B H	21	18	21
(India) Arjun M.R. (India) R Shlok
(Malaysia) M R Abdul Latif (Malaysia) M H Hashim	w	/	o

Second Round
4	(China) Liu C (China) Zhang N	21	21
(Chinese Taipei) Lee F-c (Chinese Taipei) Lee F-j	15	15
(Indonesia) H Setiawan (Malaysia) Tan B H	21	21
(Malaysia) M R Abdul Latif (Malaysia) M H Hashim	14	14

Quarterfinals
4	(China) Liu C (China) Zhang N	21	16	14
(Indonesia) H Setiawan (Malaysia) Tan B H	19	21	21

=== Bottom half ===
==== Section 3 ====
First Round
(Thailand) T Potieng (Thailand) N Yordphaisong	22	21
(Malaysia) Tan C T (Malaysia) Tan W G	20	18
(China) Bao ZL (China) Qi SS	16	16
5	(Japan) T Inoue (Japan) Y Kaneko	21	21
(China) He JT (China) Tan Q	w	/	o
(India) S Rankireddy (India) C Shetty
(China) Di ZJ (China) Zheng BB	15	14
3	(Chinese Taipei) Lu C-y (Chinese Taipei) Yang P-h	21	21

Second Round
(Thailand) T Potieng (Thailand) N Yordphaisong	18	15
5	(Japan) T Inoue (Japan) Y Kaneko	21	21
(China) He JT (China) Tan Q	23	19	21
3	(Chinese Taipei) Lu C-y (Chinese Taipei) Yang P-h	21	21	12

Quarterfinals
5	(Japan) T Inoue (Japan) Y Kaneko	21	21
(China) He JT (China) Tan Q	15	17

==== Section 4 ====
First Round
(Chinese Taipei) Liao M-c (Chinese Taipei) Su C-h	23	19	21
(China) Chen K (China) Chen SH	21	21	15
(China) Liu SW (China) Shang YC	12	16
6	(Indonesia) B Angriawan (Indonesia) Hardianto	21	21
(China) Fan QY (China) Ren XY	21	18	21
(Indonesia) W Nayaka (Indonesia) A Yusuf	14	21	10
(Chinese Taipei) Liu W-c (Chinese Taipei) Tseng M-h	12	16
2	(China) Huang KX (China) Wang YL	21	21

Second Round
(Chinese Taipei) Liao M-c (Chinese Taipei) Su C-h	18	21	19
6	(Indonesia) B Angriawan (Indonesia) Hardianto	21	18	21
(China) Fan QY (China) Ren XY	17	17
2	(China) Huang KX (China) Wang YL	21	21

Quarterfinals
6	(Indonesia) B Angriawan (Indonesia) Hardianto	21	14	23
2	(China) Huang KX (China) Wang YL	17	21	21

== Women's doubles ==
=== Seeds ===
1. (China) Huang Dongping / Li Yinhui (semifinals)
2. (Indonesia) Tiara Rosalia Nuraidah / Rizki Amelia Pradipta (quarterfinals)
3. (Chinese Taipei) Chiang Kai-hsin / Hung Shih-han (second round)
4. (China) Huang Yaqiong / Tang Jinhua (final)

=== Finals ===
Semifinals
1	(China) Huang Dongping (China) Li Yinhui	16	18
(China) Bao Yixin (China) Yu Xiaohan	21	21
4	(China) Huang Yaqiong (China) Tang Jinhua	17	21	21
(China) Du Yue (China) Xu Ya	21	14	17

Final
(China) Bao Yixin (China) Yu Xiaohan	8	21	21
4	(China) Huang Yaqiong (China) Tang Jinhua	21	14	17

=== Top half ===
==== Section 1 ====
First Round
1	(China) Huang DP (China) Li YH
BYE
(Indonesia) A S Awanda (Indonesia) A Rahayu
BYE
(Chinese Taipei) Kuo Y-w (Chinese Taipei) Lin W-c
BYE
(China) Liu XX (China) Xia YT	21	21
(Chinese Taipei) Hung Y-t (Chinese Taipei) Lai I-t	6	4

Second Round
1	(China) Huang DP (China) Li YH	w	/	o
(Indonesia) A S Awanda (Indonesia) A Rahayu
(Chinese Taipei) Kuo Y-w (Chinese Taipei) Lin W-c	13	16
(China) Liu XX (China) Xia YT	21	21

Quarterfinals
1	(China) Huang DP (China) Li YH	21	21
(China) Liu XX (China) Xia YT	17	18

==== Section 2 ====
First Round
3	(Chinese Taipei) Chiang K-h (Chinese Taipei) Hung S-h
BYE
(Chinese Taipei) Wen H-y (Chinese Taipei) Ye J-y	12	12
(China) Qiao SJ (China) Wei YX	21	21
(China) Bao YX (China) Yu XH
BYE
(China) Chen L (China) Zhong QX	23	21
(Japan) M Matsumoto (Japan) W Nagahara	21	17

Second Round
3	(Chinese Taipei) Chiang K-h (Chinese Taipei) Hung S-h	19	9
(China) Qiao SJ (China) Wei YX	21	21
(China) Bao YX (China) Yu XH	16	21	21
(China) Chen L (China) Zhong QX	21	17	13

Quarterfinals
(China) Qiao SJ (China) Wei YX	14	18
(China) Bao YX (China) Yu XH	21	21

=== Bottom half ===
==== Section 3 ====
First Round
(Chinese Taipei) Chang C-h (Chinese Taipei) Yang C-t	15	21	15
(China) Shen LJ (China) Zhou CM	21	16	21
BYE
(Chinese Taipei) Cheng Y-c (Chinese Taipei) Hu L-f
(China) Liu Y (China) Wang JX	22	16	21
(Chinese Taipei) Chen S-y (Chinese Taipei) Tang W-y	10	21	18
BYE
4	(China) Huang YQ (China) Tang JH

Second Round
(China) Shen LJ (China) Zhou CM	19	18
(Chinese Taipei) Cheng Y-c (Chinese Taipei) Hu L-f	21	21
(China) Liu Y (China) Wang JX	8	9
4	(China) Huang YQ (China) Tang JH	21	21

Quarterfinals
(Chinese Taipei) Cheng Y-c (Chinese Taipei) Hu L-f	10	16
4	(China) Huang YQ (China) Tang JH	21	21

==== Section 4 ====
First Round
(Japan) N Matsuyama (Japan) C Shida	14	15
(China) Du Y (China) Xu Y	21	21
BYE
(Japan) M Kashihara (Japan) M Kato
(Chinese Taipei) Chen H-h (Chinese Taipei) Liang T-y	21	21
(China) Lyu CN (China) Yang Y	6	19
BYE
2	(Indonesia) T R Nuraidah (Indonesia) R A Pradipta

Second Round
(China) Du Y (China) Xu Y	21	21
(Japan) M Kashihara (Japan) M Kato	12	15
(Chinese Taipei) Chen H-h (Chinese Taipei) Liang T-y	10	17
2	(Indonesia) T R Nuraidah (Indonesia) R A Pradipta	21	21

Quarterfinals
(China) Du Y (China) Xu Y	14	21	21
2	(Indonesia) T R Nuraidah (Indonesia) R A Pradipta	21	9	12

== Mixed doubles ==
=== Seeds ===
1. (China) Zhang Nan / Li Yinhui (semifinals)
2. (Indonesia) Hafiz Faisal / Shella Devi Aulia (semifinals)
3. (Malaysia) Yogendran Khrishnan / (India) Prajakta Sawant (withdrew)
4. (Chinese Taipei) Liao Min-chun / Chen Hsiao-huan (final)
5. (China) Wang Yilü / Huang Dongping (champion)
6. (Indonesia) Edi Subaktiar / Gloria Emanuelle Widjaja (second round)
7. (China) Han Chengkai / Chen Lu (quarterfinals)
8. (China) Tan Qiang / Zhou Chaomin (quarterfinals)

=== Finals ===
Semifinals
1	(China) Zhang Nan (China) Li Yinhui	18	21
4	(Chinese Taipei) Liao Min-chun (Chinese Taipei) Chen Hsiao-huan	21	23
5	(China) Wang Yilü (China) Huang Dongping	21	21
2	(Indonesia) Hafiz Faisal (Indonesia) Shella Devi Aulia	16	8

Final
4	(Chinese Taipei) Liao Min-chun (Chinese Taipei) Chen Hsiao-huan	14	10
5	(China) Wang Yilü (China) Huang Dongping	21	21

=== Top half ===
==== Section 1 ====
First Round
1	(China) Zhang N (China) Li YH	21	21
(Japan) K Gondo (Japan) W Nagahara	19	14
Q4	(Chinese Taipei) Liu W-c (Chinese Taipei) Cheng Y-c	20	18
(Indonesia) Y E Saputra (Indonesia) M G Islami	22	21
6	(Indonesia) E Subaktiar (Indonesia) G E Widjaja
Q1	BYE
(Chinese Taipei) Wang C-l (Chinese Taipei) Lee C-h	21	21
Q3	(China) Shi LF (China) Tang PY	18	13

Second Round
1	(China) Zhang N (China) Li YH	21	21
(Indonesia) Y E Saputra (Indonesia) M G Islami	16	16
6	(Indonesia) E Subaktiar (Indonesia) G E Widjaja	22	21	19
(Chinese Taipei) Wang C-l (Chinese Taipei) Lee C-h	24	19	21

Quarterfinals
1	(China) Zhang N (China) Li YH	21	21
(Chinese Taipei) Wang C-l (Chinese Taipei) Lee C-h	16	18

==== Section 2 ====
First Round
4	(Chinese Taipei) Liao M-c (Chinese Taipei) Chen H-h	21	21
(Indonesia) H Tandjaya (Indonesia) S Putri	9	16
(China) Zhou HD (China) Xu Y	21	20	21
(Chinese Taipei) Su C-h (Chinese Taipei) Ye J-y	8	22	13
8	(China) Tan Q (China) Zhou CM	21	21
(Chile) Q Zheng (United States) C Pan	7	7
(Chinese Taipei) Liao K-h (Chinese Taipei) Chang C-h	21	21
(China) Chen K (China) Xia YT	16	14

Second Round
4	(Chinese Taipei) Liao M-c (Chinese Taipei) Chen H-h	21	22
(China) Zhou HD (China) Xu Y	11	20
8	(China) Tan Q (China) Zhou CM	21	21
(Chinese Taipei) Liao K-h (Chinese Taipei) Chang C-h	15	16

Quarterfinals
4	(Chinese Taipei) Liao M-c (Chinese Taipei) Chen H-h	16	22	21
8	(China) Tan Q (China) Zhou CM	21	20	16

=== Bottom half ===
==== Section 3 ====
First Round
(Chinese Taipei) Lee F-c (Chinese Taipei) Peng L-t	12	17
(China) Fan QY (China) Shen LJ	21	21
(Chinese Taipei) Chang E-c (Chinese Taipei) Sung S-y	15	18
5	(China) Wang YL (China) Huang DP	21	21
(China) Liu SW (China) Qiao SJ	9	8
(Chinese Taipei) Tseng M-h (Chinese Taipei) Hu L-f	21	21
(Chinese Taipei) Lu C-y (Chinese Taipei) Chiang K-h	21	23	21
PFQ	(Chinese Taipei) Lee C-h (Chinese Taipei) Lin W-c	23	21	17

Second Round
(China) Fan QY (China) Shen LJ	11	7
5	(China) Wang YL (China) Huang DP	21	21
(Chinese Taipei) Tseng M-h (Chinese Taipei) Hu L-f	21	21
(Chinese Taipei) Lu C-y (Chinese Taipei) Chiang K-h	10	16

Quarterfinals
5	(China) Wang YL (China) Huang DP	21	21
(Chinese Taipei) Tseng M-h (Chinese Taipei) Hu L-f	12	15

==== Section 4 ====
First Round
(China) He JT (China) Du Y	21	21
Q2	(China) Wang P (China) Lyu CN	12	13
(United States) Y T Chan (United States) Y Kawasaki	7	9
7	(China) Han CK (China) Chen L	21	21
(Chinese Taipei) Yang P-h (Chinese Taipei) Hung S-h	8	21	21
(China) Chen SH (China) Liu XX	21	19	18
(Chinese Taipei) Yang P-h (Chinese Taipei) Wen H-y	17	19
2	(Indonesia) H Faisal (Indonesia) S D Aulia	21	21

Second Round
(China) He JT (China) Du Y	21	21	16
7	(China) Han CK (China) Chen L	11	23	21
(Chinese Taipei) Yang P-h (Chinese Taipei) Hung S-h	18	15
2	(Indonesia) H Faisal (Indonesia) S D Aulia	21	21

Quarterfinals
7	(China) Han CK (China) Chen L	17	10
2	(Indonesia) H Faisal (Indonesia) S D Aulia	21	21

Preceded by 2017 Swiss Open Grand Prix Gold	BWF Grand Prix Gold and Grand Prix; 2017 BWF Season	Succeeded by 2017 Thailand Open Grand Prix Gold
