= 2016 Badminton Asia Junior Championships – Girls' doubles =

Tournament details
- Dates: 13 – 17 July 2016
- Edition: 19
- Venue: CPB Badminton and Sports Science Training Center
- Location: Bangkok, Thailand

The Girls Doubles tournament of the 2016 Badminton Asia Junior Championships was held from 13 to 17 July at the CPB Badminton and Sports Science Training Center in Bangkok, Thailand. Chinese pair Du Yue and Li Yinhui were the defending champion. Du Yue with her new partner Xu Ya won the 2016 title after beat their compatriot Ni Bowen and Zhou Chaomin in straight game 21–15, 21–16.

== Seeded ==
1. (Indonesia) Apriyani Rahayu / Jauza Fadhila Sugiarto (third round)
2. (Hong Kong) Ng Tsz Yau / Yeung Nga Ting (third round)
3. (China) Du Yue / Xu Ya (champion)
4. (Indonesia) Mychelle Chrystine Bandaso / Serena Kani (third round)
5. (Thailand) Ruethaichanok Laisuan / Alisa Sapniti (semi-final)
6. (Indonesia) Tania Oktaviani Kusumah / Vania Arianti Sukoco (second round)
7. (Japan) Sayaka Hobara / Nami Matsuyama (third round)
8. (Thailand) Natchpapha Chatupornkarnchana / Sanicha Chumnibannakarn (third round)

== Draw ==
=== Finals ===
Quarterfinals
(Japan) Minami Kawashima (Japan) Natsumi Uesugi	21	18	25
(China) An Yu (China) Hu Yuxiang	18	21	23
3	(China) Du Yue (China) Xu Ya	22	21
(South Korea) Kim Ga-eun (South Korea) Kim Hyang-im	20	19
5	(Thailand) Ruethaichanok Laisuan (Thailand) Alisa Sapniti	21	19	21
(Japan) Natsumi Oda (Japan) Natsuki Sone	13	21	18
(China) Ni Bowen (China) Zhou Chaomin	21	21
(South Korea) Lee Yu-rim (South Korea) Park Ga-eun	12	7

Semifinals
(Japan) Minami Kawashima (Japan) Natsumi Uesugi	15	17
3	(China) Du Yue (China) Xu Ya	21	21
5	(Thailand) Ruethaichanok Laisuan (Thailand) Alisa Sapniti	13	14
(China) Ni Bowen (China) Zhou Chaomin	21	21

Final
3	(China) Du Yue (China) Xu Ya	21	21
(China) Ni Bowen (China) Zhou Chaomin	15	16

=== Top half ===
==== Section 1 ====
First round	Second round				Third round
	1	(Indonesia) A Rahayu (Indonesia) J Sugiarto	21	21
		(South Korea) Kim M-j (South Korea) Lee Y-n	17	13
					1	(Indonesia) A Rahayu (Indonesia) J Sugiarto	18	20
						(Japan) M Kawashima (Japan) N Uesugi	21	22
		(Chinese Taipei) Hu L-f (Chinese Taipei) Lee C-c	15	14
		(Japan) M Kawashima (Japan) N Uesugi	21	21

==== Section 2 ====
First round
(Malaysia) Toh EW (Malaysia) Yap L	10	12
(China) An Y (China) Hu YX	21	21

Second round
8	(Thailand) N Chatupornkarnchana (Thailand) S Chumnibannakarn	21	21
(India) S Parasa (India) A Prabhudesai	17	13
(Kazakhstan) I Gordeyeva (Kazakhstan) Y Kharchenko	4	14
(China) An Y (China) Hu YX	21	21

Third round
8	(Thailand) N Chatupornkarnchana (Thailand) S Chumnibannakarn	14	15
(China) An Y (China) Hu YX	21	21

==== Section 3 ====
First round	Second round				Third round
	3	(China) Du Y (China) Xu Y	21	21
		(Singapore) K Koh (Singapore) C Wong	11	11
					3	(China) Du Y (China) Xu Y	21	21
						(Hong Kong) Yau MY (Hong Kong) Yeung SY	8	10
		(Hong Kong) Yau MY (Hong Kong) Yeung SY	21	21
		(Thailand) N Chatputtarin (Thailand) F Long	14	19

==== Section 4 ====
First round
(South Korea) Kim G-e (South Korea) Kim H-i
(Philippines) E Inlayo (Philippines) T Pomar	wo

Second round
7	(Japan) S Hobara (Japan) N Matsuyama	21	21
(Sri Lanka) K Gunarathne (Sri Lanka) H Wijayarathne	5	7
(Macau) Gong XX (Macau) Ng WC	7	4
(South Korea) Kim G-e (South Korea) Kim H-i	21	21

Third round
7	(Japan) S Hobara (Japan) N Matsuyama	13	22
(South Korea) Kim G-e (South Korea) Kim H-i	21	24

=== Bottom half ===
==== Section 5 ====
First round
(Mongolia) B Batnairamdal (Mongolia) T Choinkhor	3	1
(India) A Kangila (India) M Umakant	21	21

Second round
(India) A Kangila (India) M Umakant	21	21
(Hong Kong) Leung SL (Hong Kong) Yeung PL	18	15
(Sri Lanka) L Hettiarachchi (Sri Lanka) I Kuruppu	6	11
5	(Thailand) R Laisuan (Thailand) A Sapniti	21	21

Third round
(India) A Kangila (India) M Umakant	25	15	16
5	(Thailand) R Laisuan (Thailand) A Sapniti	23	21	21

==== Section 6 ====
First round
(Chinese Taipei) Chang Y-h (Chinese Taipei) Lo Pei-tzu	21	21
(Singapore) N Khan (Singapore) B Lim	8	15

Second round
(Chinese Taipei) Chang Y-h (Chinese Taipei) Lo Pei-tzu	15	11
(Japan) N Oda (Japan) N Sone	21	21
(Philippines) J Francisco (Philippines) A Geverjuan	wo
4	(Indonesia) M Bandaso (Indonesia) S Kani

Third round
(Japan) N Oda (Japan) N Sone	21	21
4	(Indonesia) M Bandaso (Indonesia) S Kani	18	16

==== Section 7 ====
First round
(China) Ni BW (China) Zhou CM	21	21
(Sri Lanka) B Galagamage (Sri Lanka) T Ratnayaka	4	6

Second round
(China) Ni BW (China) Zhou CM	21	21
(Chinese Taipei) Li Y-j (Chinese Taipei) Lin J-r	14	8
(Thailand) P Chamnaktan (Thailand) K Sudjaipraparat	21	21
6	(Indonesia) T Kusumah (Indonesia) V Sukoco	15	19

Third round
(China) Ni BW (China) Zhou CM	21	21
(Thailand) P Chamnaktan (Thailand) K Sudjaipraparat	14	10

==== Section 8 ====
First round	Second round				Third round
		(Thailand) P Bonoi (Thailand) Y Yodchompu	9	9
		(South Korea) Lee Y-r (South Korea) Park G-e	21	21
						(South Korea) Lee Y-r (South Korea) Park G-e	21	21
					2	(Hong Kong) Ng TY (Hong Kong) Yeung NT	19	15
		(India) M Aggarwal (India) S Gautam	10	13
	2	(Hong Kong) Ng TY (Hong Kong) Yeung NT	21	21
