= 2016 BWF World Junior Championships – Girls' doubles =

2016 BWF World Junior Championships Girls doubles
Tournament details
- Dates: 8 November 2016 – 13 November 2016
- Edition: 18th
- Level: International
- Venue: Bilbao Arena
- Location: Bilbao

The Girls' Doubles tournament of the 2016 BWF World Junior Championships is a badminton world junior individual championships for the Eye Level Cups, held on November 8–13. The defending champion of the last edition is Chen Qingchen / Jia Yifan from China. Sayaka Hobara and Nami Matsuyama of Japan won the gold medal in this event.

== Seeded ==
1. (China) Du Yue / Xu Ya (final)
2. (Japan) Sayaka Hobara / Nami Matsuyama (champions)
3. (Hong Kong) Ng Tsz Yau / Yeung Nga Ting (quarter-final)
4. (Thailand) Ruethaichanok Laisuan / Alisa Sapniti (fourth round)
5. (South Korea) Kim Ga-eun / Kim Hyang-im (semi-final)
6. (Indonesia) Mychelle Chrystine Bandaso / Serena Kani (second round)
7. (Sweden) Emma Karlsson / Johanna Magnusson (third round)
8. (Indonesia) Yulfira Barkah / Jauza Fadhila Sugiarto (semi-final)
9. (Thailand) Pattaranan Chamnaktan / Kwanchanok Sudjaipraparat (fourth round)
10. (Indonesia) Tania Oktaviani Kusumah / Apriani Rahayu (fourth round)
11. (Russia) Alina Davletova / Anastasiia Semenova (third round)
12. (Slovenia) Nika Arih / Petra Polanc (second round)
13. (Poland) Wiktoria Dabczynska / Aleksandra Goszczynska (second round)
14. (Slovenia) Ema Cizelj / Nastja Stovanje (third round)
15. (Chinese Taipei) Hu Ling-fang / Lee Chih-chen (fourth round)
16. (France) Delphine Delrue / Margot Lambert (third round)

== Draw ==
=== Finals ===
Quarterfinals
1	(China) Du Yue (China) Xu Ya	21	21
(Japan) Minami Kawashima (Japan) Natsumi Uesugi	18	17
3	(Hong Kong) Ng Tsz Yau (Hong Kong) Yeung Nga Ting	17	17
5	(South Korea) Kim Ga-eun (South Korea) Kim Hyang-im	21	21
8	(Indonesia) Yulfira Barkah (Indonesia) Jauza Fadhila Sugiarto	18	21	22
(South Korea) Seong Ah-yeong (South Korea) Seong Na-yeong	21	16	20
(Japan) Natsumi Oda (Japan) Natsuki Sone	21	15	16
2	(Japan) Sayaka Hobara (Japan) Nami Matsuyama	19	21	21

Semifinals
1	(China) Du Yue (China) Xu Ya	21	21
5	(South Korea) Kim Ga-eun (South Korea) Kim Hyang-im	15	8
8	(Indonesia) Yulfira Barkah (Indonesia) Jauza Fadhila Sugiarto	14	13
2	(Japan) Sayaka Hobara (Japan) Nami Matsuyama	21	21

Finals
1	(China) Du Yue (China) Xu Ya	23	21	14
2	(Japan) Sayaka Hobara (Japan) Nami Matsuyama	25	19	21

=== Top Half ===
==== Section 1 ====
First round
(Mexico) N Marquez (Mexico) A Quinones	7	14
(Sweden) T Sjoo (Sweden) E Soderstrom	21	21
(Finland) M Krzywacki (Finland) H Lindberg	21	21
(Costa Rica) A L Martinez (Costa Rica) L Villalobos	8	10

Second round
1	(China) Du Y (China) Xu Y	21	21
(Norway) M Christensen (Norway) V Ellingsen	7	7
(France) V Heriau (France) Y Hoyaux	21	21
(Sweden) T Sjoo (Sweden) E Soderstrom	13	19
9	(Thailand) P Chamnaktan (Thailand) K Sudjaipraparat	21	21
(Romania) M A Dutu (Romania) I Grecea	17	4
(Moldova) E Diordiev (Moldova) V Gynga	21	21
(Finland) M Krzywacki (Finland) H Lindberg	13	18

Third round
1	(China) Du Y (China) Xu Y	21	21
(France) V Heriau (France) Y Hoyaux	6	12
9	(Thailand) P Chamnaktan (Thailand) K Sudjaipraparat	w	/	o
(Moldova) E Diordiev (Moldova) V Gynga

Fourth round
1	(China) Du Y (China) Xu Y	21	21
9	(Thailand) P Chamnaktan (Thailand) K Sudjaipraparat	10	17

==== Section 2 ====
First round
(Czech Republic) B Ausbergerova (Czech Republic) M Svetnickova	18	20
(Estonia) M A Karjus (Estonia) K Marran	21	22
(Macau) Ao I K (Macau) Kuan C L	21	17	15
(Spain) L Iglesias (Spain) C Poy	18	21	21
(Singapore) K S Koh (Singapore) C Wong	21	21
(Iceland) T Eylands (Iceland) A K Jonsdottir	14	18

Second round
6	(Indonesia) M C Bandaso (Indonesia) S Kani	10	21	10
(Japan) M Kawashima (Japan) N Uesugi	21	19	21
(Belgium) J De Langhe (Belgium) L Jaques	21	16	18
(Estonia) M A Karjus (Estonia) K Marran	17	21	21
13	(Poland) W Dabczynska (Poland) A Goszczynska	18	13
(Malaysia) P Tan (Malaysia) Toh E W	21	21
(Spain) L Iglesias (Spain) C Poy	9	18
(Singapore) K S Koh (Singapore) C Wong	21	21

Third round
(Japan) M Kawashima (Japan) N Uesugi	21	21
(Estonia) M A Karjus (Estonia) K Marran	7	15
(Malaysia) P Tan (Malaysia) Toh E W	21	21
(Singapore) K S Koh (Singapore) C Wong	16	15

Fourth round
(Japan) M Kawashima (Japan) N Uesugi	21	21
(Malaysia) P Tan (Malaysia) Toh E W	13	15

==== Section 3 ====
First round
(Lithuania) E Berzanskyte (Lithuania) G Paskeviciute	5	17
(Netherlands) D Jille (Netherlands) I van der Aar	21	21
(India) M Aggarwal (India) S Gautam	21	21
(Sri Lanka) L Hettiarachchi (Sri Lanka) I Kuruppu	7	16

Second round
3	(Hong Kong) Ng T Y (Hong Kong) Yeung N T	21	21
(Portugal) M Chang (Portugal) M Leite	4	8
(England) A Holden (England) Ngan M L	10	9
(Netherlands) D Jille (Netherlands) I van der Aar	21	21
15	(Chinese Taipei) Hu L-f (Chinese Taipei) Lee C-c	21	21
(Germany) A Schreiber (Germany) M Wilson	8	11
(Canada) G Chan (Canada) K Ho-Shue	21	16	21
(India) M Aggarwal (India) S Gautam	18	21	13

Third round
3	(Hong Kong) Ng T Y (Hong Kong) Yeung N T	21	21
(Netherlands) D Jille (Netherlands) I van der Aar	11	13
15	(Chinese Taipei) Hu L-f (Chinese Taipei) Lee C-c	21	21
(Canada) G Chan (Canada) K Ho-Shue	16	14

Fourth round
3	(Hong Kong) Ng T Y (Hong Kong) Yeung N T	21	21
15	(Chinese Taipei) Hu L-f (Chinese Taipei) Lee C-c	14	10

==== Section 4 ====
First round
(Mongolia) O Amartaivan (Mongolia) K Darkhanbaatar	2	7
(Denmark) J Dawall Jakobsen (Denmark) A Magelund	21	21
(New Zealand) E Calder-Hawkins (New Zealand) G Galvez	21	19	17
(Peru) M Vasquez (Peru) F Saponara	19	21	21
(Australia) T Ho (Australia) J Lai	16	11
(United States) J Gai (United States) J Hsu	21	21

Second round
5	(South Korea) Kim G-e (South Korea) Kim H-i	21	21
(Slovakia) T Prostinakova (Slovakia) M Tarcalova	9	5
(Russia) L Minadze (Russia) O Rogova	14	10
(Denmark) J Dawall Jakobsen (Denmark) A Magelund	21	21
14	(Slovenia) E Cizelj (Slovenia) N Stovanje	21	21
(Latvia) U Berga (Latvia) L Lencevica	10	17
(Peru) M Vasquez (Peru) F Saponara	7	7
(United States) J Gai (United States) J Hsu	21	21

Third round
5	(South Korea) Kim G-e (South Korea) Kim H-i	21	21
(Denmark) J Dawall Jakobsen (Denmark) A Magelund	14	16
14	(Slovenia) E Cizelj (Slovenia) N Stovanje	17	18
(United States) J Gai (United States) J Hsu	21	21

Fourth round
5	(South Korea) Kim G-e (South Korea) Kim H-i	21	21
(United States) J Gai (United States) J Hsu	11	12

=== Bottom Half ===
==== Section 5 ====
First round
(India) A Bhat (India) Mithula U.K.	21	21
(Romania) M Ilie (Romania) A Olariu	14	12
(Turkey) B Ercetin (Turkey) N Inci	21	21
(Australia) V He (Australia) J Son	10	11
(Portugal) A Goncalves (Portugal) M Paiva	21	21
(Armenia) M Nikoyan (Armenia) M Stepanyan	16	17

Second round
(India) A Bhat (India) Mithula U.K.	19	15
(Turkey) B Ercetin (Turkey) N Inci	21	21
(Scotland) E O'Donnell (Scotland) C Torrance	21	17	21
12	(Slovenia) N Arih (Slovenia) P Polanc	15	21	10
(Portugal) A Goncalves (Portugal) M Paiva	15	17
(Ukraine) A Prozorova (Ukraine) V Rudakova	21	21
(Peru) I Castillo (Peru) P La Torre	7	11
8	(Indonesia) Y Barkah (Indonesia) J F Sugiarto	21	21

Third round
(Turkey) B Ercetin (Turkey) N Inci	21	16	21
(Scotland) E O'Donnell (Scotland) C Torrance	9	21	12
(Ukraine) A Prozorova (Ukraine) V Rudakova	12	6
8	(Indonesia) Y Barkah (Indonesia) J F Sugiarto	21	21

Fourth round
(Turkey) B Ercetin (Turkey) N Inci	16	17
8	(Indonesia) Y Barkah (Indonesia) J F Sugiarto	21	21

==== Section 6 ====
First round
(Norway) E Hamang (Norway) E Storvik	9	7
(Chinese Taipei) Liang T-y (Chinese Taipei) Lin H-t	21	21
(Macau) Gong X X (Macau) Ng W C	9	8
(South Korea) Seong A-y (South Korea) Seong N-y	21	21
(Georgia (country)) T Batiashvili (Georgia (country)) M Khachaturyan	7	4
(Netherlands) M Baan (Netherlands) A Tirtosentono	21	21

Second round
(Chinese Taipei) Liang T-y (Chinese Taipei) Lin H-t	14	7
(South Korea) Seong A-y (South Korea) Seong N-y	21	21
(Denmark) A Boje (Denmark) F Ravn	19	21	18
11	(Russia) A Davletova (Russia) A Semenova	21	17	21
(Netherlands) M Baan (Netherlands) A Tirtosentono	21	21
(Sri Lanka) B A Galagamage (Sri Lanka) N Teshani	18	13
(Belarus) J Bitsoukova (Belarus) M Viarbitskaya	13	12
4	(Thailand) R Laisuan (Thailand) A Sapniti	21	21

Third round
(South Korea) Seong A-y (South Korea) Seong N-y	21	21
11	(Russia) A Davletova (Russia) A Semenova	12	11
(Netherlands) M Baan (Netherlands) A Tirtosentono	10	11
4	(Thailand) R Laisuan (Thailand) A Sapniti	21	21

Fourth round
(South Korea) Seong A-y (South Korea) Seong N-y	21	19	21
4	(Thailand) R Laisuan (Thailand) A Sapniti	12	21	19

==== Section 7 ====
First round
(Czech Republic) M Fuchsova (Czech Republic) T Svabikova	21	21
(Bulgaria) M Delcheva (Bulgaria) V Sakadjiiska	18	18
(South Africa) C Haasbroek (South Africa) Z van der Merwe	6	4
(Malaysia) T Muralitharan (Malaysia) Tan S J	21	21
(New Zealand) S Fu (New Zealand) T Otene	21	21
(Denmark) L Christophersen (Denmark) M Cramer	18	19

Second round
(Czech Republic) M Fuchsova (Czech Republic) T Svabikova	17	18
(Malaysia) T Muralitharan (Malaysia) Tan S J	21	21
(Estonia) H Piho (Estonia) L Tannik	10	8
16	(France) D Delrue (France) M Lambert	21	21
(New Zealand) S Fu (New Zealand) T Otene	14	11
(Japan) N Oda (Japan) N Sone	21	21
(Spain) C Leal (Spain) N Morejon	7	7
7	(Sweden) E Karlsson (Sweden) J Magnusson	21	21

Third round
(Malaysia) T Muralitharan (Malaysia) Tan S J	21	21
16	(France) D Delrue (France) M Lambert	17	15
(Japan) N Oda (Japan) N Sone	22	21	21
7	(Sweden) E Karlsson (Sweden) J Magnusson	24	18	13

Fourth round
(Malaysia) T Muralitharan (Malaysia) Tan S J	29	9	18
(Japan) N Oda (Japan) N Sone	27	21	21

==== Section 8 ====
First round
(Finland) P Lindberg (Finland) I Suutarinen	4	10
(China) Fu X (China) Zhou CM	21	21
(England) Liew F T (England) L Tolman	w	/	o
(China) Hu YX (China) Shen LJ

Second round
(China) Fu X (China) Zhou CM	21	21
(Algeria) S Ibrahim (Algeria) L Mazri	6	13
(Hong Kong) Leung Y Y (Hong Kong) Yeung S Y	17	13
10	(Indonesia) T O Kusumah (Indonesia) A Rahayu	21	21
(China) Hu YX (China) Shen LJ	13	22	21
(Germany) Y Li (Germany) J Petrikowski	21	20	18
(Hungary) R Madarasz (Hungary) V Sandoharzi	14	9
2	(Japan) S Hobara (Japan) N Matsuyama	21	21

Third round
(China) Fu X (China) Zhou CM	10	18
10	(Indonesia) T O Kusumah (Indonesia) A Rahayu	21	21
(China) Hu YX (China) Shen LJ	9	12
2	(Japan) S Hobara (Japan) N Matsuyama	21	21

Fourth round
10	(Indonesia) T O Kusumah (Indonesia) A Rahayu	21	19
2	(Japan) S Hobara (Japan) N Matsuyama	23	21
