= Xu Ya =

Xu Ya may refer to:

- Xu Ya (badminton)
- Xu Ya (politician)
