= 2018 SaarLorLux Open =

Tournament details
- Dates: 30 October – 4 November
- Level: Super 100
- Total prize money: US$75,000
- Venue: Saarlandhalle
- Location: Saarbrücken, Germany

Champions
- Men's singles: (India) Subhankar Dey
- Women's singles: (China) Cai Yanyan
- Men's doubles: (England) Marcus Ellis (England) Chris Langridge
- Women's doubles: (Bulgaria) Gabriela Stoeva (Bulgaria) Stefani Stoeva
- Mixed doubles: (England) Marcus Ellis (England) Lauren Smith

The 2018 SaarLorLux Open was a badminton tournament that took place at Saarlandhalle in Saarbrücken, Germany, from 30 October to 4 November 2018 and had a total prize of $75,000.

== Tournament ==
The 2018 SaarLorLux Open was the tenth Super 100 tournament of the 2018 BWF World Tour and also part of the SaarLorLux Open championships, which had been held since 1988. This tournament was organized by the German Badminton Association and sanctioned by the BWF.

=== Venue ===
This international tournament was held at Saarlandhalle in Saarbrücken, Saarland, Germany.

=== Point distribution ===
Below is the point distribution table for each phase of the tournament based on the BWF points system for the BWF Tour Super 100 event.

Winner	Runner-up	3/4	5/8	9/16	17/32	33/64	65/128
5,500	4,680	3,850	3,030	2,110	1,290	510	240

=== Prize money ===
The total prize money for this year's tournament was US$75,000. Distribution of prize money was in accordance with BWF regulations.

Event	Winner	Finals	Semi-finals	Quarter-finals	Last 16
Singles	$5,625	$2,850	$1,087.50	$450	$262.5
Doubles	$5,925	$2,850	$1,050	$543.75	$281.25

== Men's singles ==
=== Seeds ===
1. (China) Lin Dan (third round)
2. (Denmark) Rasmus Gemke (withdrew)
3. (Netherlands) Mark Caljouw (quarter-finals)
4. (Denmark) Jan Ø. Jørgensen (withdrew)
5. (England) Rajiv Ouseph (final)
6. (France) Lucas Corvée (third round)
7. (England) Toby Penty (quarter-finals)
8. (India) Parupalli Kashyap (quarter-finals)

=== Finals ===
Semi-finals
(India) Subhankar Dey	21	11	24
(China) Ren Pengbo	18	21	22
5	(England) Rajiv Ouseph	21	19	21
(France) Toma Junior Popov	8	21	19

Final
(India) Subhankar Dey	21	21
5	(England) Rajiv Ouseph	11	14

=== Top half ===
==== Section 1 ====
First Round
(Moldova) C Savin	16	21	14
(Finland) H Aarnio	21	17	21
(India) S Dey	21	15	21
Q2	(Belgium) E Bracke	19	21	7
Q8	(Luxembourg) Y Zaccaria	14	9
(Romania) C V Filimon	21	21
Q3	(Russia) A Serpionov	9	9
(Switzerland) C Kirchmayr	21	21

Second Round
1	(China) Lin D	21	21
(Finland) H Aarnio	13	7
(Italy) F Caponio	18	18
(India) S Dey	21	21
7	(England) T Penty	21	21
(Romania) C V Filimon	17	15
(France) T Rouxel	w	/	o
(Switzerland) C Kirchmayr

Third Round
1	(China) Lin D	20	19
(India) S Dey	22	21
7	(England) T Penty	17	21	21
(France) T Rouxel	21	13	14

Quarter-finals
(India) S Dey	21	21
7	(England) T Penty	16	9

==== Section 2 ====
First Round
(Italy) R Maddaloni	13	18
(France) L Claerbout	21	21
(Germany) M Weißkirchen	13	12
(Poland) M Rogalski	21	21
PFQ	(India) H Dani	21	21
Q4	(Austria) R Gnedt	5	12
(Finland) E Heino	12	12
(China) Ren PB	21	21

Second Round
PFQ	(Ukraine) V Atrashchenkov	11	21	15
(France) L Claerbout	21	18	21
(Germany) J Persson	10	21	16
(Poland) M Rogalski	21	14	21
6	(France) L Corvée	21	21
PFQ	(India) H Dani	16	18
Q5	(Germany) H Gerberich	7	10
(China) Ren PB	21	21

Third Round
(France) L Claerbout	13	22	21
(Poland) M Rogalski	21	20	6
6	(France) L Corvée	14	13
(China) Ren PB	21	21

Quarter-finals
(France) L Claerbout	17	21	11
(China) Ren PB	21	19	21

=== Bottom half ===
==== Section 3 ====
First Round
(Singapore) Loh K Y	21	21
Q7	(Finland) J Korhonen	16	12
(India) P Joshi	9	16
(Canada) J Ho-Shue	21	21
(China) Sun FX	21	21
(Belgium) M Moreels	19	14
Q1	(Germany) D Kramer	18	9
(Germany) K Schäfer	21	21

Second Round
(Singapore) Loh K Y	17	21	21
(Denmark) K Bruun	21	8	15
(Canada) J Ho-Shue	21	10	19
5	(England) R Ouseph	18	21	21
(China) Sun FX	11	21	21
(Republic of Ireland) N Nguyen	21	15	15
(Germany) K Schäfer	21	17
3	(Netherlands) M Caljouw	23	21

Third Round
(Singapore) Loh K Y	11	21	10
5	(England) R Ouseph	21	18	21
(China) Sun FX	12	18
3	(Netherlands) M Caljouw	21	21

Quarter-finals
5	(England) R Ouseph	21	21
3	(Netherlands) M Caljouw	12	7

==== Section 4 ====
First Round
(Slovakia) M Dratva	8	13
(Germany) A Roovers	21	21
(Spain) L E Peñalver	21	21
(Netherlands) R Mann	12	13
(Germany) L Schänzler	11	21	12
(Finland) K Koljonen	21	16	21
(Austria) W Gnedt	19	15
(Republic of Ireland) J Magee	21	21

Second Round
(Germany) A Roovers	21	21
Q6	(Germany) S Wang	12	12
(Spain) L E Peñalver	17	21	16
8	(India) Parupalli K	21	19	21
(Finland) K Koljonen	20	11
(France) T J Popov	22	21
(Republic of Ireland) J Magee	21	20	21
PFQ	(Czech Republic) J Janáček	17	22	11

Third Round
(Germany) A Roovers	14	12
8	(India) Parupalli K	21	21
(France) T J Popov	21	21
(Republic of Ireland) J Magee	14	13

Quarter-finals
8	(India) Parupalli K	16	18
(France) T J Popov	21	21

== Women's singles ==
=== Seeds ===
1. (China) Gao Fangjie (semi-finals)
2. (Indonesia) Gregoria Mariska Tunjung (withdrew)
3. (China) Cai Yanyan (champion)
4. (China) Chen Xiaoxin (final)
5. (Denmark) Line Kjærsfeldt (semi-finals)
6. (Spain) Beatriz Corrales (first round)
7. (Indonesia) Fitriani (quarter-finals)
8. (Bulgaria) Linda Zetchiri (second round)

=== Finals ===
Semi-finals
1	(China) Gao Fangjie	14	21	15
3	(China) Cai Yanyan	21	16	21
4	(China) Chen Xiaoxin	12	21	21
5	(Denmark) Line Kjærsfeldt	21	16	17

Final
3	(China) Cai Yanyan	21	19	21
4	(China) Chen Xiaoxin	19	21	17

=== Top half ===
==== Section 1 ====
First Round
1	(China) Gao FJ	21	21
Q3	(India) P Joshi	6	12
(Russia) N Perminova	10	13
(Denmark) J D Jakobsen	21	21
7	(Indonesia) Fitriani	21	21
PFQ	(Chinese Taipei) Chang Y-l	12	13
(Slovakia) M Repiská	21	21
(Switzerland) A Huser	16	18

Second Round
1	(China) Gao FJ	21	21
(Denmark) J D Jakobsen	11	13
7	(Indonesia) Fitriani	21	21
(Slovakia) M Repiská	14	18

Quarter-finals
1	(China) Gao FJ	21	21
7	(Indonesia) Fitriani	16	16

==== Section 2 ====
First Round
3	(China) Cai YY	21	21
(Singapore) Yeo J M	11	12
(Germany) F Deprez	4	16
(Japan) Y Nakai	21	21
8	(Bulgaria) L Zetchiri	21	21
(India) A Prabhudesai	12	13
(Germany) L Heim	10	17
(Denmark) I A Andersen	21	21

Second Round
3	(China) Cai YY	21	21
(Japan) Y Nakai	15	16
8	(Bulgaria) L Zetchiri	12	14
(Denmark) I A Andersen	21	21

Quarter-finals
3	(China) Cai YY	21	21
(Denmark) I A Andersen	13	12

=== Bottom half ===
==== Section 3 ====
First Round
(England) C Birch	21	21
(Mauritius) K Foo Kune	8	15
(Estonia) K Kuuba	25	21	21
6	(Spain) B Corrales	27	15	17
(Denmark) M Skødstrup	21	21
(Czech Republic) K Tomalová	16	17
Q2	(Ukraine) M Ilyinskaya	8	8
4	(China) Chen XX	21	21

Second Round
(England) C Birch	14	21	21
(Estonia) K Kuuba	21	7	10
(Denmark) M Skødstrup	12	8
4	(China) Chen XX	21	21

Quarter-finals
(England) C Birch	15	14
4	(China) Chen XX	21	21

==== Section 4 ====
First Round
(Belgium) L Tan	21	10	9
(Netherlands) S de Visch Eijbergen	11	21	21
Q4	(Germany) A Molitor	9	12
5	(Denmark) L Kjærsfeldt	21	21
(India) S Rane	21	21
(Ukraine) N Voytsekh	19	16
Q1	(Germany) T Isenberg	14	21
PFQ	(Russia) A Semenova	21	23

Second Round
(Netherlands) S de Visch Eijbergen	12	10
5	(Denmark) L Kjærsfeldt	21	21
(India) S Rane	21	21
PFQ	(Russia) A Semenova	12	8

Quarter-finals
5	(Denmark) L Kjærsfeldt	21	21
(India) S Rane	14	9

== Men's doubles ==
=== Seeds ===
1. (Malaysia) Aaron Chia / Soh Wooi Yik (final)
2. (Netherlands) Jelle Maas / Robin Tabeling (semi-finals)
3. (England) Marcus Ellis / Chris Langridge (champions)
4. (Germany) Mark Lamsfuß / Marvin Seidel (quarter-finals)

=== Finals ===
Semi-finals
1	(Malaysia) Aaron Chia (Malaysia) Soh Wooi Yik	23	13	21
(China) Huang Kaixiang (China) Wang Zekang	21	21	14
3	(England) Marcus Ellis (England) Chris Langridge	21	21
2	(Netherlands) Jelle Maas (Netherlands) Robin Tabeling	17	19

Final
1	(Malaysia) Aaron Chia (Malaysia) Soh Wooi Yik	23	18	19
3	(England) Marcus Ellis (England) Chris Langridge	21	21	21

=== Top half ===
==== Section 1 ====
First Round
(Germany) H Graalmann (Germany) P Scheiel	7^{r}
(Russia) N Khakimov (Russia) A Parakhodin	11
(Germany) C Ames (Germany) T Specht	22	8
(Republic of Ireland) J Magee (Republic of Ireland) P Reynolds	24	21
(Czech Republic) J Janáček (Germany) T Svejda	12	16
(Germany) R Beck (Germany) A Heinz	21	21

Second Round
1	(Malaysia) A Chia (Malaysia) Soh W Y	25	23
(Russia) N Khakimov (Russia) A Parakhodin	23	21
(Republic of Ireland) J Magee (Republic of Ireland) P Reynolds	6	12
(Germany) R Beck (Germany) A Heinz	21	21

Quarter-finals
1	(Malaysia) A Chia (Malaysia) Soh W Y	21	21
(Germany) R Beck (Germany) A Heinz	19	13

==== Section 2 ====
First Round
4	(Germany) M Lamsfuß (Germany) M Seidel	21	21
(Luxembourg) M Szturma (Luxembourg) M Vallenthini	11	10
(Netherlands) J Arends (Netherlands) R Jille	18	17
(India) A George (India) S Shukla	21	21
(Germany) T Fuchs (Germany) S Wang	13	16
(China) Huang KX (China) Wang ZK	21	21
(Netherlands) V Braaksma (Switzerland) A Zbinden	9	5
(India) Arjun M. R. (India) R Shlok	21	21

Second Round
4	(Germany) M Lamsfuß (Germany) M Seidel	21	21
(India) A George (India) S Shukla	19	16
(China) Huang KX (China) Wang ZK	21	21
(India) Arjun M. R. (India) R Shlok	16	18

Quarter-finals
4	(Germany) M Lamsfuß (Germany) M Seidel	17	18
(China) Huang KX (China) Wang ZK	21	21

=== Bottom half ===
==== Section 3 ====
First Round
(Sweden) R Eidestedt (Germany) P Käsbauer	25	21
(Germany) B Geiss (Germany) J C Völker	23	17
(Belgium) E Bracke (Belgium) F Golinski	21	13	21
(Czech Republic) J Bitman (Czech Republic) M Hubáček	19	21	15
(Germany) J R Jansen (Germany) J Zurwonne	16	21	21
(Russia) K Abramov (Russia) A Zinchenko	21	15	16
(Russia) V Nikulov (Russia) A Serpionov	4	10
3	(England) M Ellis (England) C Langridge	21	21

Second Round
(Sweden) R Eidestedt (Germany) P Käsbauer	21	21
(Belgium) E Bracke (Belgium) F Golinski	10	9
(Germany) J R Jansen (Germany) J Zurwonne	10	10
3	(England) M Ellis (England) C Langridge	21	21

Quarter-finals
(Sweden) R Eidestedt (Germany) P Käsbauer	17	5
3	(England) M Ellis (England) C Langridge	21	21

==== Section 4 ====
First Round
(Scotland) A Dunn (Scotland) A Hall	21	21
(Russia) A Ivanov (Russia) E Okolov	9	11
(China) Ou XY (China) Ren XY	21	21
(Germany) P Lang (Germany) T Legleitner	17	15
(France) T Gicquel (France) G Mittelheisser	w	/	o
(Germany) D Hess (Germany) J Pistorius

Second Round
(Scotland) A Dunn (Scotland) A Hall	12	18
(China) Ou XY (China) Ren XY	21	21
(France) T Gicquel (France) G Mittelheisser	15	16
2	(Netherlands) J Maas (Netherlands) R Tabeling	21	21

Quarter-finals
(China) Ou XY (China) Ren XY	18	15
2	(Netherlands) J Maas (Netherlands) R Tabeling	21	21

== Women's doubles ==
=== Seeds ===
1. (Bulgaria) Gabriela Stoeva / Stefani Stoeva (champions)
2. (France) Delphine Delrue / Léa Palermo (second round)
3. (Germany) Johanna Goliszewski / Lara Käpplein (quarter-finals)
4. (Russia) Anastasia Chervyakova / Olga Morozova (quarter-finals)

=== Finals ===
Semi-finals
1	(Bulgaria) Gabriela Stoeva (Bulgaria) Stefani Stoeva	22	21
(England) Chloe Birch (England) Lauren Smith	20	8
(Germany) Linda Efler (Germany) Isabel Herttrich	16	13
(Indonesia) Ni Ketut Mahadewi Istirani (Indonesia) Rizki Amelia Pradipta	21	21

Final
1	(Bulgaria) Gabriela Stoeva (Bulgaria) Stefani Stoeva	22	15	21
(Indonesia) Ni Ketut Mahadewi Istirani (Indonesia) Rizki Amelia Pradipta	20	21	19

=== Top half ===
==== Section 1 ====
First Round
(Germany) K Altenbeck (Germany) X Kölmel	5	15
(Japan) M Fujii (Japan) N Ono	21	21
(Czech Republic) A Bášová (Czech Republic) M Fuchsová	21	21
(Germany) K Holenz (Germany) A Molitor	8	14

Second Round
1	(Bulgaria) G Stoeva (Bulgaria) S Stoeva	21	21
(Japan) M Fujii (Japan) N Ono	15	14
(Germany) J Petrikowski (Germany) F Volkmann	21	21
(Czech Republic) A Bášová (Czech Republic) M Fuchsová	18	13

Quarter-finals
1	(Bulgaria) G Stoeva (Bulgaria) S Stoeva	21	21
(Germany) J Petrikowski (Germany) F Volkmann	7	6

==== Section 2 ====
First Round
(Indonesia) A S Awanda (Indonesia) D D Haris
(Germany) T Isenberg (Germany) B Stepper	w	/	o
(England) C Birch (England) L Smith	21	21
(Germany) L Kaminski (Germany) H Pohl	16	18
(China) Dong WJ (China) Feng XY
(Germany) N Becker (Germany) H Jänichen	w	/	o

Second Round
3	(Germany) J Goliszewski (Germany) L Käpplein	21	21
(Germany) T Isenberg (Germany) B Stepper	8	16
(England) C Birch (England) L Smith	21	21
(Germany) N Becker (Germany) H Jänichen	5	9

Quarter-finals
3	(Germany) J Goliszewski (Germany) L Käpplein	15	14
(England) C Birch (England) L Smith	21	21

=== Bottom half ===
==== Section 3 ====
First Round
(Italy) S Garino (Italy) L Iversen	17	5
(Germany) L Efler (Germany) I Herttrich	21	21
(Ukraine) M Ilyinskaya (Ukraine) Y Zharka	19	19
(Switzerland) N Fankhauser (Netherlands) I Tabeling	21	21
(Germany) A Horbach (Germany) T Wurm	13	12
(Republic of Ireland) S Boyle (Republic of Ireland) R Darragh	21	21

Second Round
(Germany) L Efler (Germany) I Herttrich	21	18	21
(Switzerland) N Fankhauser (Netherlands) I Tabeling	17	21	16
(Republic of Ireland) S Boyle (Republic of Ireland) R Darragh	13	18
4	(Russia) A Chervyakova (Russia) O Morozova	21	21

Quarter-finals
(Germany) L Efler (Germany) I Herttrich	21	21
4	(Russia) A Chervyakova (Russia) O Morozova	14	10

==== Section 4 ====
First Round
(China) Li WM (China) Zheng Y	w	/	o
(Netherlands) S de Visch Eijbergen (Netherlands) I van der Aar
(Indonesia) N K M Istirani (Indonesia) R A Pradipta	21	21
(Germany) E Janssens (Germany) K Ostermeyer	10	14

Second Round
(China) Li WM (China) Zheng Y	23	21
(Germany) A Jäger (Germany) S Küspert	21	11
(Indonesia) N K M Istirani (Indonesia) R A Pradipta	21	21
2	(France) D Delrue (France) L Palermo	13	19

Quarter-finals
(China) Li WM (China) Zheng Y	20	19
(Indonesia) N K M Istirani (Indonesia) R A Pradipta	22	21

== Mixed doubles ==
=== Seeds ===
1. (England) Marcus Ellis / Lauren Smith (champions)
2. (Germany) Mark Lamsfuß / Isabel Herttrich (quarter-finals)
3. (Netherlands) Jacco Arends / Selena Piek (withdrew)
4. (Germany) Marvin Seidel / Linda Efler (semi-finals)
5. (China) Lu Kai / Chen Lu (final)
6. (Netherlands) Robin Tabeling / Cheryl Seinen (first round)
7. (Republic of Ireland) Sam Magee / Chloe Magee (quarter-finals)
8. (China) Ren Xiangyu / Zhou Chaomin (withdrew)

=== Finals ===
Semi-finals
1	(England) Marcus Ellis (England) Lauren Smith	21	21
4	(Germany) Marvin Seidel (Germany) Linda Efler	14	19
(Germany) Peter Käsbauer (Germany) Johanna Goliszewski	19	9
5	(China) Lu Kai (China) Chen Lu	21	21

Final
1	(England) Marcus Ellis (England) Lauren Smith	19	21	21
5	(China) Lu Kai (China) Chen Lu	21	18	10

=== Top half ===
==== Section 1 ====
First Round
1	(England) M Ellis (England) L Smith	w	/	o
(Netherlands) R Jille (Netherlands) I van der Aar
(France) T Gicquel (France) D Delrue	21	21
(Germany) J Zurwonne (Germany) E Janssens	16	15
7	(Republic of Ireland) S Magee (Republic of Ireland) C Magee	21	21
(Germany) D Hess (Germany) S Küspert	10	12
(Germany) P Scheiel (Germany) F Volkmann	21	21
(Austria) R Gnedt (Slovakia) U Polc	19	9

Second Round
1	(England) M Ellis (England) L Smith	14	21	21
(France) T Gicquel (France) D Delrue	21	18	16
7	(Republic of Ireland) S Magee (Republic of Ireland) C Magee	24	21
(Germany) P Scheiel (Germany) F Volkmann	22	12

Quarter-finals
1	(England) M Ellis (England) L Smith	21	18	21
7	(Republic of Ireland) S Magee (Republic of Ireland) C Magee	14	21	11

==== Section 2 ====
First Round
4	(Germany) M Seidel (Germany) L Efler	21	21
(Russia) V Nikulov (Russia) A Semenova	7	11
(Germany) L Konder (Germany) K Holenz	w	/	o
(China) Ou XY (China) Feng XY
8	(China) Ren XY (China) Zhou CM
(Poland) P Śmiłowski (Poland) M Świerczyńska	w	/	o
(Republic of Ireland) P Reynolds (Republic of Ireland) R Darragh	21	21
(Switzerland) A Zbinden (Switzerland) N Fankhauser	14	18

Second Round
4	(Germany) M Seidel (Germany) L Efler	21	21
(Germany) L Konder (Germany) K Holenz	7	9
(Poland) P Śmiłowski (Poland) M Świerczyńska	21	19	21
(Republic of Ireland) P Reynolds (Republic of Ireland) R Darragh	17	21	18

Quarter-finals
4	(Germany) M Seidel (Germany) L Efler	w	/	o
(Poland) P Śmiłowski (Poland) M Świerczyńska

=== Bottom half ===
==== Section 3 ====
First Round
(Germany) A Heinz (Germany) A Horbach	16	21	21
(Belgium) F Golinski (Russia) N Perminova	21	14	13
(Germany) P Käsbauer (Germany) J Goliszewski	21	13	21
6	(Netherlands) R Tabeling (Netherlands) C Seinen	19	21	16
(France) G Mittelheisser (France) L Palermo	21	21
(Germany) J C Völker (Germany) J Petrikowski	16	10
(Germany) H Graalmann (Germany) A Jäger	w	/	o
3	(Netherlands) J Arends (Netherlands) S Piek

Second Round
(Germany) A Heinz (Germany) A Horbach	11	7
(Germany) P Käsbauer (Germany) J Goliszewski	21	21
(France) G Mittelheisser (France) L Palermo	w	/	o
(Germany) H Graalmann (Germany) A Jäger

Quarter-finals
(Germany) P Käsbauer (Germany) J Goliszewski	21	21
(France) G Mittelheisser (France) L Palermo	19	16

==== Section 4 ====
First Round
(Czech Republic) J Bitman (Czech Republic) A Bášová	19	21	14
(Ukraine) V Atrashchenkov (Ukraine) Y Zharka	21	17	21
(Germany) J Pistorius (Germany) L Käpplein	3^{r}
5	(China) Lu K (China) Chen L	5
(Germany) P Lang (Germany) H Pohl	w	/	o
(China) Wang ZK (China) Dong WJ
(Scotland) A Hall (Scotland) J MacPherson	22	19	15
2	(Germany) M Lamsfuß (Germany) I Herttrich	20	21	21

Second Round
(Ukraine) V Atrashchenkov (Ukraine) Y Zharka	15	18
5	(China) Lu K (China) Chen L	21	21
(Germany) P Lang (Germany) H Pohl	13	14
2	(Germany) M Lamsfuß (Germany) I Herttrich	21	21

Quarter-finals
5	(China) Lu K (China) Chen L	21	21
2	(Germany) M Lamsfuß (Germany) I Herttrich	16	15

Preceded by 2018 Macau Open	BWF World Tour; 2018 BWF season	Succeeded by 2018 Fuzhou China Open
