= Jauza Fadhila Sugiarto =

Indonesian badminton player (born 1999)

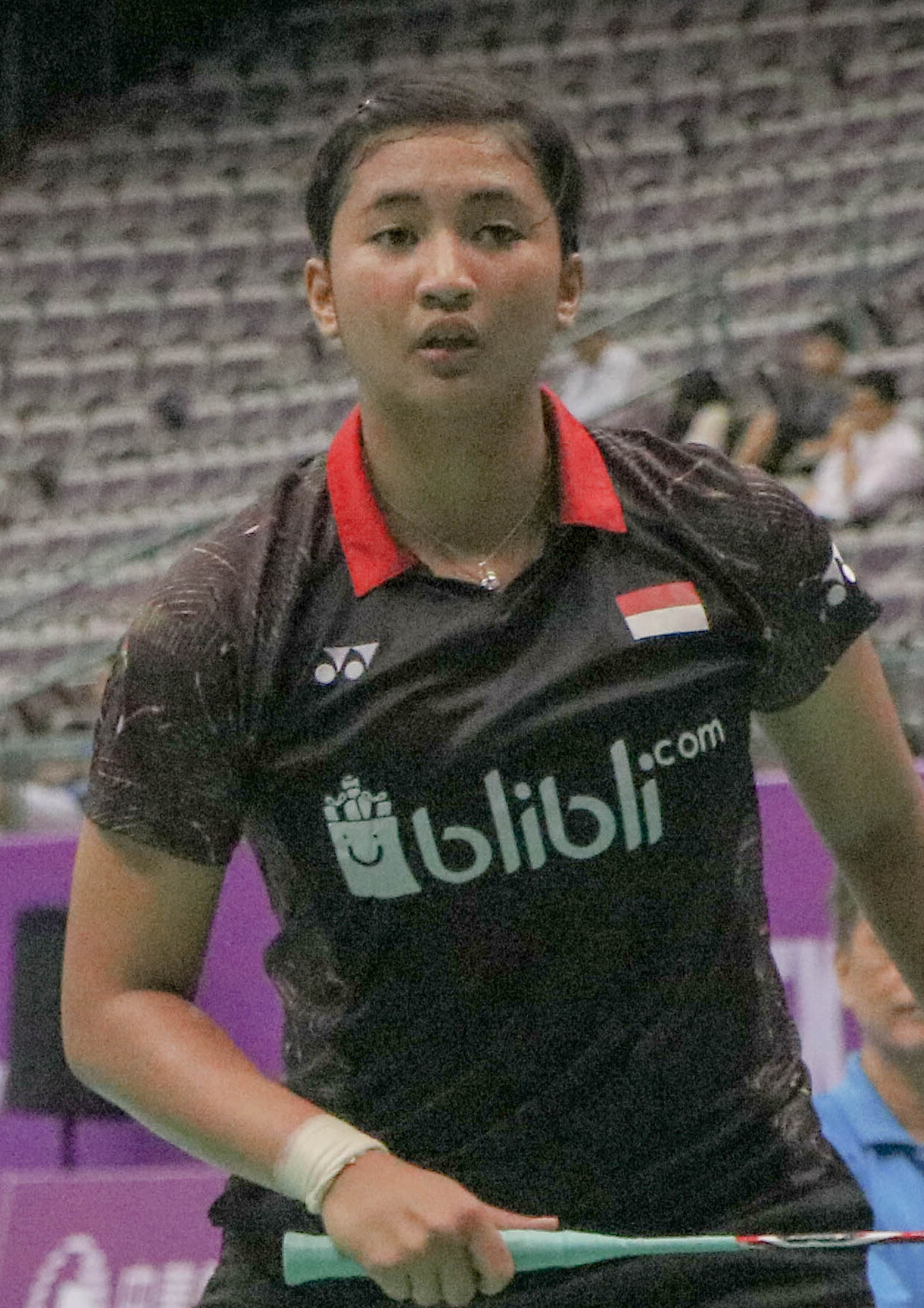

Personal information
- Born: 16 April 1999 (age 27) Jakarta, Indonesia
- Height: 1.65 m (5 ft 5 in)
- Weight: 60 kg (132 lb)

Sport
- Country: Indonesia
- Sport: Badminton
- Handedness: Right

Women's singles & doubles
- Highest ranking: 143 (WS 25 August 2016); 26 (WD with Yulfira Barkah 26 March 2019)
- Current ranking: 67 (WD with Yulfira Barkah 18 January 2022)
- BWF profile
Medal record
Women's badminton
Representing Indonesia
World Junior Championships
Silver medal – second place	2014 Alor Setar	Mixed team
Silver medal – second place	2017 Yogyakarta	Girls' doubles
Bronze medal – third place	2016 Bilbao	Girls' doubles
Asian Junior Championships
Silver medal – second place	2017 Jakarta	Mixed team
Bronze medal – third place	2015 Bangkok	Mixed team
Bronze medal – third place	2017 Jakarta	Girls' doubles

Jauza Fadhila Sugiarto (born 16 April 1999) is an Indonesian badminton player affiliated with Jaya Raya Jakarta club.

== Personal life ==
She's the youngest child of former World Champion Icuk Sugiarto and also the younger sister of Tommy, one of the elite men's singles player.

== Achievements ==
=== BWF World Junior Championships ===
Girls' doubles
Year	Venue	Partner	Opponent	Score	Result
2016	Bilbao Arena; Bilbao, Spain	(Indonesia) Yulfira Barkah	(Japan) Sayaka Hobara (Japan) Nami Matsuyama	14–21, 13–21	Bronze
2017	GOR Among Rogo; Yogyakarta, Indonesia	(Indonesia) Ribka Sugiarto	(South Korea) Baek Ha-na (South Korea) Lee Yu-rim	21–18, 11–21, 3–21	Silver

=== Asian Junior Championships ===
Girls' doubles
Year	Venue	Partner	Opponent	Score	Result
2017	Jaya Raya Sports Hall Training Center; Jakarta, Indonesia	(Indonesia) Ribka Sugiarto	(China) Liu Xuanxuan (China) Xia Yuting	16–21, 17–21	Bronze

=== BWF International Challenge/Series (2 titles) ===
Women's doubles
Year	Tournament	Partner	Opponent	Score	Result
2015	Singapore International	(Indonesia) Apriyani Rahayu	(Indonesia) Melvira Oklamona (Indonesia) Rika Rositawati	22–20, 16–21, 21–10	(gold) Winner
2016	Indonesia International	(Indonesia) Apriyani Rahayu	(Indonesia) Dian Fitriani (Indonesia) Nadya Melati	12–21, 21–18, 22–20	(gold) Winner

BWF International Challenge tournament
BWF International Series tournament

=== BWF Junior International (2 titles) ===
Girls' doubles
Year	Tournament	Partner	Opponent	Score	Result
2014	Indonesia Junior International	(Indonesia) Apriyani Rahayu	(Indonesia) Yulfira Barkah (Indonesia) Dianita Saraswati	21–13, 21–18	(gold) Winner
2017	Malaysia Junior International	(Indonesia) Ribka Sugiarto	(Malaysia) Pearly Tan (Malaysia) Toh Ee Wei	21–17, 21–18	(gold) Winner

BWF Junior International Grand Prix tournament
BWF Junior International Challenge tournament
BWF Junior International Series tournament
BWF Junior Future Series tournament

== Performance timeline ==
=== National team ===
- Junior level

Team events	2014	2015	2016	2017
Asian Junior Championships	QF	Bronze	QF	Silver
World Junior Championships	Silver	A		5th

=== Individual competitions ===
- Junior level

Events	2014	2015	2016	2017
Asian Junior Championships	QF (GD)	R1 (GS); R3 (GD)	R3 (GD)	Bronze (GD)
World Junior Championships	R3 (GS)	R3 (GS); R4 (GD)	Bronze (GD)	Silver (GD)

- Senior level

Events	2019
Asian Championships	R1
World Championships	R1

Tournament	BWF World Tour		Best
Tournament	2018	2019	Best
Thailand Masters	A	R2	R2 (2016, 2019)
Malaysia Masters	A	QF	QF (2019)
Indonesia Masters	A	R1	R2 (2014, 2015)
Swiss Open	A	R2	R2 (2019)
Orléans Masters	A	QF	QF (2019)
Malaysia Open	A	R1	R1 (2016, 2019)
Singapore Open	A	R2	R2 (2019)
New Zealand Open	A	R1	R1 (2019)
Australian Open	A	R1	R1 (2019)
Indonesia Open	R1	R1	R2 (2016)
Japan Open	A	R1	R1 (2019)
Thailand Open	A	R1	R2 (2015)
Hyderabad Open	SF	A	SF (2018)
Vietnam Open	R2	A	R2 (2018)
Indonesia Masters Super 100	QF	A	QF (2018)
Chinese Taipei Open	R1	A	R1 (2018)
Macau Open	SF	A	SF (2018)
Syed Modi International	QF	A	QF (2018)
Korea Masters	SF	A	SF (2018)
Year-end ranking	45	39	26
Tournament	2018	2019	Best

Tournament	BWF Superseries			Best
Tournament	2015	2016	2017	Best
Malaysia Open	A	R1 (WS); R1 (WD)	A	R1 (2016)
Singapore Open	R1 (WD)	R1 (WD)	A	R1 (2015, 2016)
Indonesia Open	A	R1 (WS); R2 (WD)	R1	R2 (2016)
Year-end ranking	203 (WS); 77 (WD)	184 (WS); 58 (WD)	217	

Tournament	BWF Grand Prix and Grand Prix Gold					Best
Tournament	2013	2014	2015	2016	2017	Best
Malaysia Masters	A		R1	A		R1 (2015)
Thailand Masters	—N/a			R2	A	R2 (2016)
Thailand Open			R2 (WD)	w/d	A	R2 (2015)
Indonesian Masters	R1 (WD)	R1 (WS); R2 (WD)	R1 (WS); R2 (WD)	A	—N/a	R2 (2014, 2015)
Year-end ranking	431 (WD)	437 (WS); 212 (WD)	203 (WS); 77 (WD)	184 (WS); 58 (WD)	217	
