= Ni Bowen =

Chinese badminton player (born 1998)

Ni Bowen 倪博文
Personal information
- Born: 11 July 1998 (age 28) Zhejiang, China

Sport
- Country: China
- Sport: Badminton

Women's & mixed doubles
- Highest ranking: 277 (WD 22 September 2016); 148 (XD 27 April 2017)
- BWF profile
Medal record
WOmen's badminton
Representing China
World Junior Championships
Gold medal – first place	2016 Bilbao	Mixed team
Asian Junior Championships
Silver medal – second place	2016 Bangkok	Girls' doubles

Ni Bowen (Chinese: 倪博文; born 11 July 1998) is a Chinese badminton player. In 2016, she won the silver medal at the Asia Junior Championships in the girls' doubles event partnered with Zhou Chaomin. In 2017, she won her first international senior tournament at the Osaka International Challenge in the mixed doubles event partnered with Wang Sijie.

== Achievements ==
=== Asian Junior Championships ===
Girls' doubles
Year	Venue	Partner	Opponent	Score	Result
2016	CPB Badminton Training Center; Bangkok, Thailand	(China) Zhou Chaomin	(China) Du Yue (China) Xu Ya	15–21, 16–21	Silver

=== BWF International Challenge/Series ===
Mixed doubles
Year	Tournament	Partner	Opponent	Score	Result
2017	Osaka International	(China) Wang Sijie	(South Korea) Park Kyung-hoon (South Korea) Kong Hee-yong	18–21, 21–16, 21–12	(gold) Winner

BWF International Challenge tournament
BWF International Series tournament
