= Serena Kani =

Indonesian badminton player (born 1999)

Personal information
- Born: 7 September 1999 (age 27) Jakarta, Indonesia
- Height: 1.69 m (5 ft 7 in)
- Weight: 62 kg (137 lb)

Sport
- Country: Indonesia
- Sport: Badminton
- Handedness: Right

Women's & mixed doubles
- Highest ranking: 79 (WD with Mychelle Crhystine Bandaso, 30 March 2017); 70 (XD with Hafiz Faizal, 24 January 2023)
- Current ranking: 383 (WD with Catherine Choi; 335 (XD with Danang Dwi Septiadi) (16 June 2026)
- BWF profile
Medal record
Women's badminton
Representing Indonesia
World Junior Championships
Silver medal – second place	2015 Lima	Mixed team
Asian Junior Championships
Silver medal – second place	2017 Jakarta	Mixed team

Serena Kani (born 7 September 1999) is an Indonesian badminton player. She is trained at the Djarum club, and has joined the club since 2012. Kani was part of the Indonesia team that won silver medal at the 2015 World and 2017 Asian Junior Championships. She won her first senior international title at the 2016 Tata Open India International tournament in the women's doubles event partnered with Mychelle Crhystine Bandaso.

== Personal life ==
She is the daughter of 1996 Summer Olympics bronze medalist Denny Kantono.

== Achievements ==
=== BWF International Challenge/Series (3 titles, 3 runners-up) ===
Women's doubles
Year	Tournament	Partner	Opponent	Score	Result
2016	Singapore International	(Indonesia) Mychelle Crhystine Bandaso	(Indonesia) Suci Rizky Andini (Indonesia) Yulfira Barkah	14–21, 12–21	(silver) Runner-up
2016	Tata Open India International	(Indonesia) Mychelle Crhystine Bandaso	(Indonesia) Maretha Dea Giovani (Indonesia) Tania Oktaviani Kusumah	11–8, 8–11, 2–11, 11–9, 11–7	(gold) Winner
2021	Austrian Open	(Indonesia) Ni Ketut Mahadewi Istarani	(Malaysia) Anna Cheong (Malaysia) Yap Cheng Wen	21–11, 21–16	(gold) Winner

Mixed doubles
Year	Tournament	Partner	Opponent	Score	Result
2019	South Australia International	(Indonesia) Dejan Ferdinansyah	(Canada) Joshua Hurlburt-Yu (Canada) Josephine Wu	19–21, 27–25, 16–21	(silver) Runner-up
2023	Canadian International	(Indonesia) Rian Agung Saputro	(United States) Presley Smith (United States) Allison Lee	12–21, 21–8, 21–16	(gold) Winner
2025	Canadian International	(Indonesia) Danang Dwi Septiadi	(Canada) Timothy Lock (Canada) Chloe Hoang	19–21, 19–21	(silver) Runner-up

BWF International Challenge tournament
BWF International Series tournament

=== BWF Junior International (2 titles, 1 runner-up) ===
Girls' doubles
Year	Tournament	Partner	Opponent	Score	Result
2015	Italian Junior	(Indonesia) Mychelle Crhystine Bandaso	(Indonesia) Marsheilla Gischa Islami (Indonesia) Rahmadhani Hastiyanti Putri	21–19, 21–15	(gold) Winner
2015	India Junior International	(Indonesia) Mychelle Crhystine Bandaso	(Indonesia) Marsheilla Gischa Islami (Indonesia) Rahmadhani Hastiyanti Putri	20–22, 17–21	(silver) Runner-up
2015	Indonesia Junior International	(Indonesia) Mychelle Crhystine Bandaso	(Indonesia) Marsheilla Gischa Islami (Indonesia) Rahmadhani Hastiyanti Putri	23–21, 20–22, 21–18	(gold) Winner

BWF Junior International Grand Prix tournament
BWF Junior International Challenge tournament
BWF Junior International Series tournament
BWF Junior Future Series tournament

== Performance timeline ==
Key

W	Won	F	Finalist	SF	Semi-finalist
QF	Quarter-finalist	#R	Rounds 4, 3, 2, 1	RR	Round-robin stage
Q#	Qualification round	A	Absent	w/d	Withdrew
G	Gold	S	Silver	B	Bronze
NH	Not held	N/A	Not applicable	DNQ	Did not qualify

=== National team ===
- Junior level

Team events	2015	2016	2017
Asian Junior Championships	A	QF	S
World Junior Championships	S	5th	5th

=== Individual competitions ===
==== Junior level ====
- Girls' doubles

Events	2015	2016	2017
Asian Junior Championships	A	3R	QF
World Junior Championships	3R	2R	2R

==== Senior level ====
===== Women's doubles =====
Events	2016
Asian Championships	1R

Tournament	BWF Superseries / Grand Prix		BWF World Tour									Best	Ref
Tournament	2016	2017	2018	2019	2020	2021	2022	2023	2024	2025	2026	Best	Ref
Indonesia Masters	2R	NH	1R	A								2R ('16)	
Indonesia Open	A	1R	A		NH	A						1R ('17)	
U.S. Open	A				NH			A		2R	1R	2R ('25)	
Canada Open	A				NH		A		1R	A	1R	1R ('24, '26)	
Indonesia Masters Super 100	NH		1R	1R	NH		2R	A				2R ('22)	
Vietnam Open	A		2R	A	NH		A					2R ('18)	
Year-end ranking	83	253	219	346	333	193	205	589	399	372		79	

===== Mixed doubles =====
Events	2021	Ref
World Championships	2R	

Tournament	BWF World Tour									Best	Ref
Tournament	2018	2019	2020	2021	2022	2023	2024	2025	2026	Best	Ref
Malaysia Open	A		NH		1R	A				1R ('22)	
Indonesia Masters	A				1R	A				1R ('22)	
Thailand Masters	A		2R	NH		A				2R ('20)	
Malaysia Masters	A			NH	2R	A				2R ('22)	
Singapore Open	A		NH		2R	A				2R ('22)	
Indonesia Open	A		NH	A	1R	A				1R ('22)	
U.S. Open	A		NH			A	w/d	1R	1R	1R ('25, '26)	
Canada Open	A		NH		A		2R	1R	1R	2R ('24)	
Indonesia Masters Super 100	2R	2R	NH		2R	A				2R ('18, '19, '22)	
Vietnam Open	A		NH		2R	A				2R ('22)	
Spain Masters	A			QF	NH	A		NH		QF ('21)	
Year-end ranking	294	118	101	79	154	257	322	361		70	
