= 2016 Badminton Asia Junior Championships =

Tournament details
- Dates: 9–17 July 2016
- Edition: 19
- Venue: CPB Badminton and Sports Science Training Center
- Location: Bangkok, Thailand

The 2016 Badminton Asia Junior Championships is the 19th edition of the Asia continental junior championships to crown the best U-19 badminton players across Asia. This tournament was held in Bangkok, Thailand, between 9 and 17 July 2016. The championships consists of mixed team and individual events. There were 19 countries with over 250 players participating in this edition.

== Venue ==
This tournament was held at CPB Badminton and Sports Science Training Center.

== Seed ==
The defending champion, China, was the top seeds in the mixed team event followed by Thailand and Indonesia. In the individual event, The host country Thai boys' Kantaphon Wangcharoen, and girls' Pornpawee Chochuwong were the top seeds. China's pairs He Jiting / Tan Qiang and He Jiting / Du Yue were the top seeding in the boys' and mixed doubles respectively, while the girls' doubles goes to Indonesian pair Apriani Rahayu and Jauza Fadhila Sugiarto.

- Mixed team
1. China
2. Thailand
3. Indonesia
4. Japan
5. India
6. Malaysia
7. Hong Kong
8. South Korea
- Boys' singles
1. (Thailand) Kantaphon Wangcharoen
2. (India) Chirag Sen
3. (Japan) Koki Watanabe
4. (Malaysia) Lee Zii Jia
5. (Thailand) Pachaarapol Nipornram
6. (Thailand) Korakrit Laotrakul
7. (Chinese Taipei) Lee Chia-hao
8. (China) Sun Feixiang
- Girls' singles
1. (Thailand) Pornpawee Chochuwong
2. (Malaysia) Goh Jin Wei
3. (China) Chen Yufei
4. (Indonesia) Gregoria Mariska
5. (Japan) Natsuki Nidaira
6. (South Korea) Kim Ga-eun
7. (China) Gao Fangjie
8. (Thailand) Pattarasuda Chaiwan
- Boys' doubles
1. (China) He Jiting / Tan Qiang
2. (Thailand) Pakin Kuna-Anuvit / Natthapat Trinkajee
3. (China) Han Chengkai / Zhou Haodong
4. (Indonesia) Andika Ramadiansyah / Rinov Rivaldy
5. (Thailand) Warit Sarapat / Panachai Worasaktyanan
6. (Malaysia) Ooi Zi Heng / Soh Wooi Yik
7. (India) Krishna Prasad Garaga / Dhruv Kapila
8. (China) Fan Qiuyue / Ren Xiangyu
- Girls' doubles
1. (Indonesia) Apriani Rahayu / Jauza Fadhila Sugiarto
2. (Hong Kong) Ng Tsz Yau / Yeung Nga Ting
3. (China) Du Yue / Xu Ya
4. (Indonesia) Mychelle Crhystine Bandaso / Serena Kani
- Mixed doubles
1. (China) He Jiting / Du Yue
2. (Thailand) Pakin Kuna-Anuvit / Kwanchanok Sudjaipraparat
3. (Indonesia) Rinov Rivaldy / Apriani Rahayu
4. (Thailand) Pachaarapol Nipornram / Ruethaichanok Laisuan

== Medalists ==
In the mixed team event, China retain the title for the fourth consecutive time. China also made a clean sweep of all the individual titles.

| Event | Gold | Silver | Bronze |
|---|---|---|---|
| Teams | China; Gao Zhengze; Han Chengkai; He Jiting; Liu Haichao; Sun Feixiang; Tan Qiang; Zhou Haodong; Zhu Junhao; An Yu; Cai Yanyan; Chen Yufei; Du Yue; Gao Fangjie; Hu Yuxiang; Xu Ya; Zhou Chaomin | South Korea; Byun Jung-soo; Kang Min-hyuk; Kim Moon-jun; Kim Won-ho; Lee Hak-beom; Lee Sang-min; Na Sung-seung; Park Chan Ik; Baek Ha-na; Byun Soo-in; Kim Ga-eun; Kim Hyang-im; Kim Min-ji; Lee Ye-na; Lee Yu-rim; Park Ga-eun | Japan; Mahiro Kaneko; Yunosuke Kubota; Takuma Obayashi; Hiroki Okamura; Masayuki Onodera; Koki Watanabe; Kyohei Yamashita; Naoki Yamazawa; Shiori Ebihara; Sayaka Hobara; Minami Kawashima; Nami Matsuyama; Natsuki Nidaira; Natsuki Sone; Asuka Takahashi; Natsumi Uesugi |
| Teams | China; Gao Zhengze; Han Chengkai; He Jiting; Liu Haichao; Sun Feixiang; Tan Qiang; Zhou Haodong; Zhu Junhao; An Yu; Cai Yanyan; Chen Yufei; Du Yue; Gao Fangjie; Hu Yuxiang; Xu Ya; Zhou Chaomin | South Korea; Byun Jung-soo; Kang Min-hyuk; Kim Moon-jun; Kim Won-ho; Lee Hak-beom; Lee Sang-min; Na Sung-seung; Park Chan Ik; Baek Ha-na; Byun Soo-in; Kim Ga-eun; Kim Hyang-im; Kim Min-ji; Lee Ye-na; Lee Yu-rim; Park Ga-eun | Thailand; Pakin Kuna-Anuvit; Korakrit Laotrakul; Pachaarapol Nipornram; Warit Sarapat; Natthapat Trinkajee; Kandis Wanaroon; Kantaphon Wangcharoen; Panachai Worasaktyanan; Nuntakarn Aimsaard; Phittayaporn Chaiwan; Natchpapha Chatupornkarnchana; Pornpawee Chochuwong; Sanicha Chumnibannakarn; Ruethaichanok Laisuan; Alisa Sapniti; Kwanchanok Sudjaipraparat |
| Boys' singles | (China) Sun Feixiang | (Chinese Taipei) Lee Chia-hao | (China) Liu Haichao |
| Boys' singles | (China) Sun Feixiang | (Chinese Taipei) Lee Chia-hao | (India) Lakshya Sen |
| Girls' singles | (China) Chen Yufei | (Indonesia) Gregoria Mariska Tunjung | (China) Gao Fangjie |
| Girls' singles | (China) Chen Yufei | (Indonesia) Gregoria Mariska Tunjung | (South Korea) Kim Ga-eun |
| Boys' doubles | (China) Han Chengkai (China) Zhou Haodong | (China) He Jiting (China) Tan Qiang | (China) Fan Qiuyue (China) Ren Xiangyu |
| Boys' doubles | (China) Han Chengkai (China) Zhou Haodong | (China) He Jiting (China) Tan Qiang | (Malaysia) Ooi Zi Heng (Malaysia) Soh Wooi Yik |
| Girls' doubles | (China) Du Yue (China) Xu Ya | (China) Ni Bowen (China) Zhou Chaomin | (Japan) Minami Kawashima (Japan) Natsumi Uesugi |
| Girls' doubles | (China) Du Yue (China) Xu Ya | (China) Ni Bowen (China) Zhou Chaomin | (Thailand) Ruethaichanok Laisuan (Thailand) Alisa Sapniti |
| Mixed doubles | (China) He Jiting (China) Du Yue | (South Korea) Kim Won-ho (South Korea) Lee Yu-rim | (Indonesia) Rinov Rivaldy (Indonesia) Apriani Rahayu |
| Mixed doubles | (China) He Jiting (China) Du Yue | (South Korea) Kim Won-ho (South Korea) Lee Yu-rim | (China) Zhou Haodong (China) Hu Yuxiang |

== Medal table ==
| Rank | Nation | Gold | Silver | Bronze | Total |
|---|---|---|---|---|---|
| 1 | China (CHN) | 6 | 2 | 4 | 12 |
| 2 | South Korea (KOR) | 0 | 2 | 1 | 3 |
| 3 | Indonesia (INA) | 0 | 1 | 1 | 2 |
| 4 | Chinese Taipei (TPE) | 0 | 1 | 0 | 1 |
| 5 | Japan (JPN) | 0 | 0 | 2 | 2 |
| 5 | Thailand (THA) | 0 | 0 | 2 | 2 |
| 7 | India (IND) | 0 | 0 | 1 | 1 |
| 7 | Malaysia (MAS) | 0 | 0 | 1 | 1 |
| Totals (8 entries) | | 6 | 6 | 12 | 24 |
