= Yulfira Barkah =

Indonesian badminton player (born 1998)

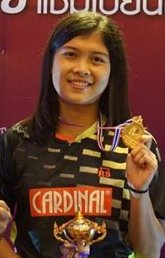

Personal information
- Born: 4 February 1998 (age 28) Medan, North Sumatra, Indonesia
- Height: 1.72 m (5 ft 8 in)

Sport
- Country: Indonesia
- Sport: Badminton
- Handedness: Right

Women's & mixed doubles
- Highest ranking: 26 (WD with Jauza Fadhila Sugiarto 26 March 2019); 152 (XD with Beno Drajat 28 April 2016)
- Current ranking: 59 (WD with Jauza Fadhila Sugiarto); 122 (WD with Agatha Imanuela); 127 (WD with Febby Valencia Dwijayanti Gani; (25 May 2021)
- BWF profile
Medal record
Women's badminton
Representing Indonesia
World Junior Championships
Bronze medal – third place	2016 Bilbao	Girls' doubles
Asian Junior Championships
Bronze medal – third place	2015 Bangkok	Mixed team

Yulfira Barkah (born 4 February 1998) is an Indonesian badminton player from Medan, North Sumatra, who trained at the Mutiara Cardinal Bandung club. She was part of the national junior team that won the bronze medal at the 2015 Asian Junior Championships, later won the girls' doubles bronze at the 2016 World Junior Championships. Barkah claimed her first international title at the 2016 Smiling Fish International in the women's doubles event partnered with Suci Rizky Andini.

== Achievements ==
=== BWF World Junior Championships ===
Girls' doubles
Year	Venue	Partner	Opponent	Score	Result
2016	Bilbao Arena; Bilbao, Spain	(Indonesia) Jauza Fadhila Sugiarto	(Japan) Sayaka Hobara (Japan) Nami Matsuyama	14–21, 13–21	Bronze

=== BWF World Tour (1 title) ===
The BWF World Tour, which was announced on 19 March 2017 and implemented in 2018, is a series of elite badminton tournaments sanctioned by the Badminton World Federation (BWF). The BWF World Tour is divided into levels of World Tour Finals, Super 1000, Super 750, Super 500, Super 300 (part of the HSBC World Tour), and the BWF Tour Super 100.

Women's doubles
Year	Tournament	Level	Partner	Opponent	Score	Result
2021	Spain Masters	Super 300	(Indonesia) Febby Valencia Dwijayanti Gani	(Denmark) Amalie Magelund (Denmark) Freja Ravn	21–16, 21–14	(gold) Winner

=== BWF International Challenge/Series (3 titles, 2 runners-up) ===
Women's doubles
Year	Tournament	Partner	Opponent	Score	Result
2016	Smiling Fish International	(Indonesia) Suci Rizky Andini	(Indonesia) Rahmadhani Hastiyanti Putri (Indonesia) Rika Rositawati	21–18, 21–18	(gold) Winner
2016	Singapore International	(Indonesia) Suci Rizky Andini	(Indonesia) Mychelle Crhystine Bandaso (Indonesia) Serena Kani	21–14, 21–12	(gold) Winner
2017	Polish Open	(Indonesia) Meirisa Cindy Sahputri	(Chinese Taipei) Chang Hsin-tien (Chinese Taipei) Yu Chien-hui	21–12, 14–21, 21–14	(gold) Winner
2019	Malaysia International	(Indonesia) Agatha Imanuela	(Japan) Natsu Saito (Japan) Naru Shinoya	15–21, 23–21, 9–21	(silver) Runner-up

Mixed doubles
Year	Tournament	Partner	Opponent	Score	Result
2015	Smiling Fish International	(Indonesia) Beno Drajat	(Thailand) Parinyawat Thongnuam (Thailand) Phataimas Muenwong	16–21, 13–21	(silver) Runner-up

BWF International Challenge tournament
BWF International Series tournament

== Performance timeline ==
Key

W	Won	F	Finalist	SF	Semi-finalist
QF	Quarter-finalist	#R	Rounds 4, 3, 2, 1	RR	Round-robin stage
Q#	Qualification round	A	Absent	w/d	Withdrew
G	Gold	S	Silver	B	Bronze
NH	Not held	N/A	Not applicable	DNQ	Did not qualify

=== National team ===
- Junior level

Team event	2015
Asian Junior Championships	B

=== Individual competitions ===
==== Junior level ====
- Girls' doubles

Event	2016
World Junior Championships	B

- Mixed doubles

Event	2016
World Junior Championships	3R

==== Senior level ====
===== Women's doubles =====
Events	2019
Asian Championships	1R
World Championships	1R

Tournament	BWF Superseries / Grand Prix			BWF World Tour				Best
Tournament	2015	2016	2017	2018	2019	2020	2021	Best
Thailand Masters	NH	A		2R	2R	A	NH	2R ('18, '19)
Swiss Open	A				2R	NH	A	2R ('19)
Orléans Masters	N/A			A	QF	NH	2R	QF ('19)
Lingshui China Masters	N/A			1R	A	NH		1R ('18)
Malaysia Masters	A			1R	QF	A	NH	QF ('19)
New Zealand Open	A		QF	1R	1R	NH		QF ('17)
Australian Open	A			QF	1R	NH		QF ('18)
Spain Masters	NH			A			W	W ('21)
Malaysia Open	A				1R	NH		1R ('19)
Singapore Open	A			1R	2R	NH		2R ('19)
Korea Masters	A		1R	SF	A	NH		SF ('18)
Thailand Open	A		1R	1R	1R	A	NH	1R ('17, '18, '19)
Hyderabad Open	N/A			SF	A	NH		SF ('18)
Chinese Taipei Open	A			1R	A	NH		1R ('18)
Vietnam Open	A		SF	2R	1R	NH		SF ('17)
Japan Open	A				1R	NH		1R ('19)
Indonesia Masters Super 100	N/A			QF	QF	NH		QF ('18, '19)
Syed Modi International	A			QF	A	NH		QF ('18)
Macau Open	A		2R	SF	A	NH		SF ('18)
Hong Kong Open	A		1R	A		NH		1R ('17)
Indonesia Masters	1R	QF	NH	2R	1R	A		QF ('16)
Indonesia Open	A		1R	1R	1R	NH	A	1R ('17, '18, '19)
Year-end ranking	157	63	76	45	39	55	66	26

===== Mixed doubles =====
Tournament	BWF Superseries / Grand Prix		Best
Tournament	2015	2016	Best
Indonesia Masters	1R	2R	2R ('16)
Year-end ranking	165	316	152
