= Tania Oktaviani Kusumah =

Indonesian badminton player (born 1998)

Personal information
- Born: 13 October 1998 (age 28) Bandung, West Java, Indonesia
- Height: 1.52 m (5 ft 0 in)

Sport
- Country: Indonesia
- Sport: Badminton
- Handedness: Right

Women's doubles
- Highest ranking: 48 (with Vania Arianti Sukoco 6 December 2018); 59 (with Ni Ketut Mahadewi Istarani 17 March 2020); 64 (with Della Destiara Haris 28 May 2019)
- Current ranking: 66 (with Ni Ketut Mahadewi Istarani); 112 (with Della Destiara Haris) (21 September 2021)
- BWF profile
Medal record
Women's badminton
Representing Indonesia
Asia Mixed Team Championships
Bronze medal – third place	2019 Hong Kong	Mixed team

Tania Oktaviani Kusumah (born 13 October 1998) was an Indonesian badminton player. She is a women's doubles specialist, and has trained at the Djarum club since 2010. In 2015, she won the Maybank Malaysia Youth International. One year later, she reached rank 3 at the Yonex Polish Open, at the Walikota Surabaya Victor International Series and at the Smiling Fish International Challenge. She also finished in the second place at the 2016 India International and 2017 Singapore International. Together with Vania Arianti Sukoco, they won the women's doubles title at the National Championships in Pangkal Pinang.

== Achievements ==
=== BWF World Tour (1 title) ===
The BWF World Tour, which was announced on 19 March 2017 and implemented in 2018, is a series of elite badminton tournaments sanctioned by the Badminton World Federation (BWF). The BWF World Tour is divided into levels of World Tour Finals, Super 1000, Super 750, Super 500, Super 300 (part of the HSBC World Tour), and the BWF Tour Super 100.

Women's doubles
Year	Tournament	Level	Partner	Opponent	Score	Result
2019	Russian Open	Super 100	(Indonesia) Ni Ketut Mahadewi Istarani	(Japan) Miki Kashihara (Japan) Miyuki Kato	23–21, 21–16	(gold) Winner

=== BWF International Challenge/Series (1 title, 2 runners-up) ===
Women's doubles
Year	Tournament	Partner	Opponent	Score	Result
2016	India International	(Indonesia) Maretha Dea Giovani	(Indonesia) Mychelle Crhystine Bandaso (Indonesia) Serena Kani	8–11, 11–8, 11–2, 9–11, 7–11	(silver) Runner-up
2017	Singapore International	(Indonesia) Vania Arianti Sukoco	(Indonesia) Nisak Puji Lestari (Indonesia) Rahmadhani Hastiyanti Putri	19–21, 24–26	(silver) Runner-up
2018	Indonesia International	(Indonesia) Vania Arianti Sukoco	(Japan) Miki Kashihara (Japan) Miyuki Kato	20–22, 21–11, 21–11	(gold) Winner

BWF International Challenge tournament
BWF International Series tournament

== Performance timeline ==
Key

W	Won	F	Finalist	SF	Semi-finalist
QF	Quarter-finalist	#R	Rounds 4, 3, 2, 1	RR	Round-robin stage
Q#	Qualification round	A	Absent	w/d	Withdrew
G	Gold	S	Silver	B	Bronze
NH	Not held	N/A	Not applicable	DNQ	Did not qualify

=== National team ===
- Junior level

Team event	2016
World Junior Championships	5th

- Senior level

Team events	2019	2020
Asia Team Championships	—N/a	QF
Asia Mixed Team Championships	B	—N/a

=== Individual competitions ===
- Junior level

Event	2016
World Junior Championships	4R

- Senior level

Tournament	BWF World Tour			Best
Tournament	2018	2019	2020	Best
Indonesia Masters	1R	1R	2R	2R ('16, '20)
Thailand Masters	A		Q1	Q1 ('20)
Spain Masters	A	1R	A	1R (2019)
German Open	A	1R	—N/a	1R ('19)
All England Open	A	1R	A	1R ('19)
India Open	A	SF	—N/a	SF ('19)
Malaysia Open	A	1R	—N/a	1R ('19)
Singapore Open	A	1R	—N/a	1R ('19)
Russian Open	A	W	—N/a	W ('19)
Hyderabad Open	QF	1R	—N/a	QF ('18)
Akita Masters	A	1R	—N/a	1R ('19)
Chinese Taipei Open	2R	1R	—N/a	2R ('18)
Vietnam Open	A	QF	—N/a	QF ('19)
Indonesia Masters Super 100	1R	w/d	—N/a	1R ('18)
Macau Open	2R	A	—N/a	2R ('18)
Hong Kong Open	A	2R	—N/a	2R ('19)
Korea Masters	1R	A	—N/a	1R ('18)
Syed Modi International	QF	A	—N/a	QF ('18)
Year-end ranking	49	76	59	48
Tournament	2018	2019	2020	Best

Tournament	BWF Grand Prix and Grand Prix Gold		Best
Tournament	2016	2017	Best
Thailand Open	A	QF	QF ('17)
Indonesia Masters	2R	—N/a	2R ('16)
Year-end ranking	128	172	
