= Subhankar Dey =

Indian badminton player (born 1993)

Personal information
- Born: 6 June 1993 (age 33) Kolkata, India

Sport
- Country: India
- Sport: Badminton
- Handedness: Right

Men's singles
- Highest ranking: 38 (29 October 2019)
- BWF profile
Medal record
Men's badminton
Representing India
Asia Team Championships
Bronze medal – third place	2020 Manila	Men's team

Subhankar Dey (born 6 June 1993) is an Indian badminton player. Born in Kolkata, he currently trains in Vashi, Navi Mumbai, at his own badminton academy named Subhankar Dey Badminton Academy. He is also running another Badminton Centre which is in Sodepur, Kolkata. He played for the Bengaluru Blasters and Awadhe Warriors in the Premier Badminton League. Dey won his first World Tour title at the 2018 SaarLorLux Open.

== Achievements ==
=== BWF World Tour (1 title) ===
The BWF World Tour, which was announced on 19 March 2017 and implemented in 2018, is a series of elite badminton tournaments sanctioned by the Badminton World Federation (BWF). The BWF World Tour is divided into levels of World Tour Finals, Super 1000, Super 750, Super 500, Super 300 (part of the HSBC World Tour), and the BWF Tour Super 100.

Men's singles
Year	Tournament	Level	Opponent	Score	Result
2018	SaarLorLux Open	Super 100	(England) Rajiv Ouseph	21–11, 21–14	(gold) Winner

=== BWF International Challenge/Series (4 titles, 8 runners-up) ===
Men's singles
Year	Tournament	Opponent	Score	Result
2012	Iraq International	(Turkey) Emre Lale	17–21, 20–22	(silver) Runner-up
2013	Uganda International	(Sri Lanka) Dinuka Karunaratna	16–21, 17–21	(silver) Runner-up
2013	Kenya International	(Nigeria) Gideon Babalola	21–19, 21–19	(gold) Winner
2013	Bahrain International Challenge	(India) Sameer Verma	21–19, 14–21, 12–21	(silver) Runner-up
2014	Bahrain International	(Sri Lanka) Dinuka Karunaratna	21–19, 13–21, 21–11	(gold) Winner
2014	Bangladesh International	(Malaysia) Lim Chi Wing	12–21, 17–21	(silver) Runner-up
2017	Iceland International	(Finland) Kalle Koljonen	21–11, 21–17	(gold) Winner
2017	Portugal International	(Denmark) Victor Svendsen	21–19, 21–19	(gold) Winner
2018	KaBaL International	(Denmark) Victor Svendsen	19–21, 19–21	(silver) Runner-up
2018	Dubai International	(Russia) Vladimir Malkov	10–21, 15–21	(silver) Runner-up
2019	Italian International	(France) Christo Popov	16–21, 20–22	(silver) Runner-up
2022 (II)	India International Challenge	(India) Priyanshu Rajawat	13–21, 11–21	(silver) Runner-up

BWF International Challenge tournament
BWF International Series tournament
BWF Future Series tournament
