= Mychelle Crhystine Bandaso =

Indonesian badminton player (born 1998)

Personal information
- Born: 1 May 1998 (age 28) Tarakan, Indonesia
- Height: 1.65 m (5 ft 5 in)
- Weight: 54 kg (119 lb)

Sport
- Country: Indonesia
- Sport: Badminton
- Handedness: Left

Women's & mixed doubles
- Highest ranking: 27 (XD with Adnan Maulana 9 August 2022)
- BWF profile
Medal record
Women's badminton
Representing Indonesia
SEA Games
Silver medal – second place	2021 Vietnam	Women's team
Bronze medal – third place	2021 Vietnam	Mixed doubles
World Junior Championships
Silver medal – second place	2015 Lima	Mixed team

Mychelle Crhystine Bandaso (born 1 May 1998) is an Indonesian former badminton player affiliated PB Djarum club. She won a bronze medal in the mixed doubles at the 2021 SEA Games partnered with Adnan Maulana.

== Career ==
In 2016, Bandaso won her first senior international title at the India International in the women's doubles event partnering Serena Kani. They also reaching the finals at the Singapore International.

In 2017, Bandaso won the mixed doubles title at the Singapore International partnering Andika Ramadiansyah. In 2018, Bandaso finished as mixed doubles finalists in two events in Malaysia; the International Challenge with Ramadiansyah and the International Series event with Fachryza Abimanyu.

In 2019, Bandaso won her first World Tour title at the Russian Open in the mixed doubles with Adnan Maulana. The duo beating host pair Evgenij Dremin and Evgenia Dimova in the final in straight games. Bandaso and Maulana also finished as runners-up at the World Tour Super 100 events in Hyderabad and Indonesia.

According to former national shuttler Debby Susanto, Mychelle Bandaso retired due to an unspecified medical condition.

== Achievements ==
=== SEA Games ===
Mixed doubles
Year	Venue	Partner	Opponent	Score	Result	Ref.
2021	Bac Giang Gymnasium; Bắc Giang, Vietnam	(Indonesia) Adnan Maulana	(Malaysia) Hoo Pang Ron (Malaysia) Cheah Yee See	21–18, 16–21, 17–21	Bronze	

=== BWF World Tour (1 title, 2 runners-up) ===
The BWF World Tour, which was announced on 19 March 2017 and implemented in 2018, is a series of elite badminton tournaments sanctioned by the Badminton World Federation (BWF). The BWF World Tour is divided into levels of World Tour Finals, Super 1000, Super 750, Super 500, Super 300 (part of the HSBC World Tour), and the BWF Tour Super 100.

Mixed doubles
Year	Tournament	Level	Partner	Opponent	Score	Result	Ref.
2019	Russian Open	Super 100	(Indonesia) Adnan Maulana	(Russia) Evgenij Dremin (Russia) Evgenia Dimova	19–21, 21–13, 21–15	(gold) Winner	
2019	Hyderabad Open	Super 100	(Indonesia) Adnan Maulana	(Malaysia) Hoo Pang Ron (Malaysia) Cheah Yee See	21–16, 16–21, 11–21	(silver) Runner-up	
2019	Indonesia Masters	Super 100	(Indonesia) Adnan Maulana	(China) Guo Xinwa (China) Zhang Shuxian	18–21, 21–16, 26–28	(silver) Runner-up	

=== BWF International Challenge/Series (2 titles, 3 runners-up) ===
Women's doubles
Year	Tournament	Partner	Opponent	Score	Result	Ref.
2016	Singapore International	(Indonesia) Serena Kani	(Indonesia) Suci Rizky Andini (Indonesia) Yulfira Barkah	14–21, 12–21	(silver) Runner-up	
2016	India International	(Indonesia) Serena Kani	(Indonesia) Maretha Dea Giovani (Indonesia) Tania Oktaviani Kusumah	11–8, 8–11, 2–11, 11–9, 11–7	(gold) Winner	

Mixed doubles
Year	Tournament	Partner	Opponent	Score	Result	Ref.
2017	Singapore International	(Indonesia) Andika Ramadiansyah	(Hong Kong) Chang Tak Ching (Hong Kong) Ng Wing Yung	21–16, 21–18	(gold) Winner	
2018	Malaysia International	(Indonesia) Andika Ramadiansyah	(Malaysia) Chen Tang Jie (Malaysia) Peck Yen Wei	21–12, 21–23, 13–21	(silver) Runner-up	
2018	Malaysia International	(Indonesia) Fachryza Abimanyu	(Indonesia) Andika Ramadiansyah (Indonesia) Bunga Fitriani Romadhini	21–19, 15–21, 13–21	(silver) Runner-up	

BWF International Challenge tournament
BWF International Series tournament
BWF Future Series tournament

== Performance timeline ==
Key

W	Won	F	Finalist	SF	Semi-finalist
QF	Quarter-finalist	#R	Rounds 4, 3, 2, 1	RR	Round-robin stage
Q#	Qualification round	A	Absent	w/d	Withdrew
G	Gold	S	Silver	B	Bronze
NH	Not held	N/A	Not applicable	DNQ	Did not qualify

=== National team ===
- Junior level

Team event	2015	2016
World Junior Championships	S	5th

- Senior level

Team events	2021
SEA Games	S

=== Individual competitions ===
==== Junior level ====
- Girls' doubles

Events	2015	2016
Asian Junior Championships	A	3R
World Junior Championships	3R	2R

- Mixed doubles

Events	2015	2016
Asian Junior Championships	A	QF
World Junior Championships	2R	A

==== Senior level ====
===== Women's doubles =====
Event	2016
Asian Championships	1R

Tournament	BWF Superseries / Grand Prix				BWF World Tour	Best	Ref
Tournament	2014	2015	2016	2017	2018	Best	Ref
Orléans Masters	NA				2R	2R ('18)	
Singapore Open	A				1R	1R ('18)	
Thailand Open	A				1R	1R ('18)	
Vietnam Open	A			1R	2R	2R ('18)	
Indonesia Masters Super 100	NH				1R	1R ('18)	
Indonesia Masters	2R	A	2R	NH	A	2R ('14, '16)	
Year-end ranking	323		83	184	164	79	
Tournament	2014	2015	2016	2017	2018	Best	

===== Mixed doubles =====
Event	2021	2022	Ref
SEA Games	B	NH	
Asian Championships	NH	2R	

Tournament	BWF Superseries / Grand Prix				BWF World Tour					Best	Ref
Tournament	2014	2015	2016	2017	2018	2019	2020	2021	2022	Best	Ref
German Open	A						NH		QF	QF ('22)	
All England Open	A						1R	A	1R	1R ('20, '22)	
Swiss Open	A						NH	1R	2R	2R ('22)	
Orléans Masters	NA				QF	A	NH	A		QF ('18)	
Korea Open	A						NH		QF	QF ('22)	
Korea Masters	A						NH		1R	1R ('22)	
Thailand Open	A				1R	A	1R	NH	A	2R ('20)	
Thailand Open	A				1R	A	2R	NH	A	2R ('20)	
Indonesia Masters	1R	A		NH	1R	A	1R	2R	1R	2R ('21)	
Indonesia Open	A						NH	2R	A	2R ('21)	
Singapore Open	A				1R	A	NH		A	1R ('18)	
Taipei Open	A					2R	NH		A	2R ('19)	
Vietnam Open	A			1R	1R	2R	NH		A	2R ('19)	
Indonesia Masters Super 100	NH				2R	F	NH		A	F ('19)	
Denmark Open	A							1R	A	1R ('21)	
Hylo Open	A							2R	A	2R ('21)	
Macau Open	A					2R	NH			2R ('19)	
Hyderabad Open	NH				A	F	NH			F ('19)	
Lingshui China Masters	NA				A	2R	NH			2R ('19)	
Russian Open	A					W	NH			W ('19)	
Thailand Masters	NH		A		2R	A	QF	NH		QF ('20)	
Year-end ranking	551	—	—	95	72	42	33	30	50	27	
Tournament	2014	2015	2016	2017	2018	2019	2020	2021	2022	Best	
