= Chen Lu (badminton) =

Chinese badminton player (born 1997)

Chen Lu 陈露
Personal information
- Born: 18 December 1997 (age 28) Guangdong, China
- Height: 1.67 m (5 ft 6 in)

Sport
- Country: China
- Sport: Badminton

Women's & mixed doubles
- Highest ranking: 131 (WD 7 December 2017); 34 (XD 1 November 2018)
- Current ranking: 204 (WD); 42 (XD) (16 August 2022)
- BWF profile
Medal record
Women's badminton
Representing China
World Junior Championships
Gold medal – first place	2015 Lima	Mixed team

Chen Lu (Chinese: 陈露, born 18 December 1997) is a Chinese badminton player. In 2016, she won the China International tournament in the mixed doubles event partnered with Wang Sijie, and in 2017, she became the runner-up in the women's doubles event partnered with Zhou Chaomin.

== Achievements ==
=== BWF World Tour (1 runner-up) ===
The BWF World Tour, announced on 19 March 2017 and implemented in 2018, is a series of elite badminton tournaments, sanctioned by Badminton World Federation (BWF). The BWF World Tour are divided into six levels, namely World Tour Finals, Super 1000, Super 750, Super 500, Super 300 (part of the HSBC World Tour), and the BWF Tour Super 100.

Mixed doubles
Year	Tournament	Level	Partner	Opponent	Score	Result
2018	SaarLorLux Open	Super 100	(China) Lu Kai	(England) Marcus Ellis (England) Lauren Smith	21–19, 18–21, 10–21	(silver) Runner-up

=== BWF International Challenge/Series (1 title, 1 runner-up) ===
Women's doubles
Year	Tournament	Partner	Opponent	Score	Result
2017	China International	(China) Zhou Chaomin	(China) Du Yue (China) Xu Ya	11–9, 8–11, 11–9, 8–11, 5–11	(silver) Runner-up

Mixed doubles
Year	Tournament	Partner	Opponent	Score	Result
2016	China International	(China) Wang Sijie	(China) Zhou Haodong (China) Jia Yifan	21–18, 18–21, 21–17	(gold) Winner

BWF International Challenge tournament
BWF International Series tournament
