= Xu Ya (badminton) =

Chinese badminton player (born 1998)

Xu Ya 徐涯
Personal information
- Born: 20 January 1998 (age 28) Hubei, China
- Height: 1.73 m (5 ft 8 in)

Sport
- Country: China
- Sport: Badminton
- Handedness: Left

Women's & mixed doubles
- Highest ranking: 20 (WD 30 November 2017); 100 (XD 19 April 2018)
- BWF profile
Medal record
Women's badminton
Representing China
World Junior Championships
Gold medal – first place	2016 Bilbao	Mixed team
Silver medal – second place	2016 Bilbao	Girls' doubles
Asia Junior Championships
Gold medal – first place	2016 Bangkok	Mixed team
Gold medal – first place	2016 Bangkok	Girls' doubles

Xu Ya (Chinese: 徐涯; born 20 January 1998) is a Chinese badminton player. In 2016, she won the Asia Junior Championships in the girls' doubles event partnered with Du Yue. She also won the silver medal at the World Junior Championships in the girls' doubles event with Du. In 2017, she won the China International tournament in the women's doubles event partnered with Du and became the runner-up in the mixed doubles event with Tan Qiang.

== Achievements ==
=== BWF World Junior Championships ===
Girls' doubles
Year	Venue	Partner	Opponent	Score	Result
2016	Bilbao Arena; Bilbao, Spain	(China) Du Yue	(Japan) Sayaka Hobara (Japan) Nami Matsuyama	23–25, 21–19, 14–21	Silver

=== Asian Junior Championships ===
Girls' doubles
Year	Venue	Partner	Opponent	Score	Result
2016	CPB Badminton Training Center; Bangkok, Thailand	(China) Du Yue	(China) Ni Bowen (China) Zhou Chaomin	21–15, 21–16	Gold

=== BWF International Challenge/Series (1 title, 2 runners-up) ===
Women's doubles
Year	Tournament	Partner	Opponent	Score	Result
2016	China International	(China) Hu Yuxiang	(China) Chen Qingchen (China) Jia Yifan	8–21, 10–21	(silver) Runner-up
2017	China International	(China) Du Yue	(China) Chen Lu (China) Zhou Chaomin	9–11, 11–8, 9–11, 11–8, 11–5	(gold) Winner

Mixed doubles
Year	Tournament	Partner	Opponent	Score	Result
2017	China International	(China) Tan Qiang	(Japan) Tomoya Takashina (Japan) Rie Etoh	7–11, 5–11, 11–13	(silver) Runner-up

BWF International Challenge tournament
BWF International Series tournament
