= Zhou Chaomin =

Chinese badminton player (born 1998)

Zhou Chaomin 周超敏
Personal information
- Born: 18 March 1998 (age 28) Guangdong, China

Sport
- Country: China
- Sport: Badminton

Women's & mixed doubles
- Highest ranking: 78 (WD 5 November 2019); 33 (XD with Ren Xiangyu 5 November 2019)
- BWF profile
Medal record
Women's badminton
Representing China
World Junior Championships
Gold medal – first place	2015 Lima	Mixed team
Gold medal – first place	2016 Bilbao	Mixed team
Asian Junior Championships
Gold medal – first place	2016 Bangkok	Mixed team
Silver medal – second place	2016 Bangkok	Girls' doubles

Zhou Chaomin (Chinese: 周超敏, born 18 March 1998) is a Chinese badminton player. In 2016, she won the silver medal at the Asia Junior Championships in the girls' doubles event partnered with Ni Bowen. In 2017, she became the runner-up at the China International tournament in the women's doubles event partnered with Chen Lu.

== Achievements ==
=== Asian Junior Championships ===
Girls' doubles
Year	Venue	Partner	Opponent	Score	Result
2016	CPB Badminton Training Center; Bangkok, Thailand	(China) Ni Bowen	(China) Du Yue (China) Xu Ya	15–21, 16–21	Silver

=== BWF World Tour (1 runner-up) ===
The BWF World Tour, which was announced on 19 March 2017 and implemented in 2018, is a series of elite badminton tournaments sanctioned by the Badminton World Federation (BWF). The BWF World Tour is divided into levels of World Tour Finals, Super 1000, Super 750, Super 500, Super 300, and the BWF Tour Super 100.

Mixed doubles
Year	Tournament	Level	Partner	Opponent	Score	Result
2019	SaarLorLux Open	Super 100	(China) Ren Xiangyu	(China) Guo Xinwa (China) Zhang Shuxian	18–21, 19–21	(silver) Runner-up

=== BWF International Challenge/Series (1 title, 1 runner-up) ===
Women's doubles
Year	Tournament	Partner	Opponent	Score	Result
2017	China International	(China) Chen Lu	(China) Du Yue (China) Xu Ya	11–9, 8–11, 11–9, 8–11, 5–11	(silver) Runner-up

Mixed doubles
Year	Tournament	Partner	Opponent	Score	Result
2019	Belarus International	(China) Ren Xiangyu	(China) Guo Xinwa (China) Zhang Shuxian	22–20, 21–19	(gold) Winner

BWF International Challenge tournament
BWF International Series tournament
