= 2018 India Open =

2018 badminton tournament in New Delhi

Tournament details
- Dates: 30 January – 4 February
- Level: Super 500
- Total prize money: US$350,000
- Venue: Siri Fort Indoor Stadium
- Location: New Delhi, India

Champions
- Men's singles: (China) Shi Yuqi
- Women's singles: (United States) Zhang Beiwen
- Men's doubles: (Indonesia) Marcus Fernaldi Gideon (Indonesia) Kevin Sanjaya Sukamuljo
- Women's doubles: (Indonesia) Greysia Polii (Indonesia) Apriyani Rahayu
- Mixed doubles: (Denmark) Mathias Christiansen (Denmark) Christinna Pedersen

The 2018 India Open, officially the Yonex-Sunrise Dr. Akhilesh Das Gupta India Open 2018, was a badminton tournament which took place at Siri Fort Indoor Stadium in India from 30 January to 4 February 2018 and had a total purse of $350,000.

== Tournament ==
The 2018 India Open was the fourth tournament of the 2018 BWF World Tour and also part of the India Open championships which has been held since 2008. This tournament was organized by the Badminton Association of India and sanctioned by the BWF. The tournament was renamed in a tribute for Akhilesh Das, president of the Badminton Association of India, who died in April 2017.

=== Venue ===
This international tournament was held at Siri Fort Indoor Stadium in New Delhi, India.

=== Point distribution ===
Below is a table with the point distribution for each phase of the tournament based on the BWF points system for the BWF World Tour Super 500 event.

Winner	Runner-up	3/4	5/8	9/16	17/32	33/64	65/128
9,200	7,800	6,420	5,040	3,600	2,220	880	430

=== Prize money ===
The total prize money for the 2018 tournament was US$350,000. Distribution of prize money was in accordance with BWF regulations.

Event	Winner	Finals	Semifinals	Quarterfinals	Last 16
Singles	$26,250	$13,300	$5,075	$2,100	$1,225
Doubles	$27,650	$13,300	$4,900	$2,537.50	$1,312.50

== Men's singles ==
=== Seeds ===
1. (Denmark) Viktor Axelsen (withdrew)
2. (India) Srikanth Kidambi (second round)
3. (Chinese Taipei) Chou Tien-chen (final)
4. (China) Shi Yuqi (champion)
5. (India) Prannoy H. S. (first round)
6. (Chinese Taipei) Wang Tzu-wei (quarterfinals)
7. (Denmark) Anders Antonsen (first round)
8. (India) B. Sai Praneeth (quarterfinals)

=== Finals ===
Semifinals
(China) Qiao Bin	21	16
3	(Chinese Taipei) Chou Tien-chen	23	21
4	(China) Shi Yuqi	18	21	21
Q2	(Malaysia) Iskandar Zulkarnain	21	10	19

Final
3	(Chinese Taipei) Chou Tien-chen	18	14
4	(China) Shi Yuqi	21	21

=== Top half ===
==== Section 1 ====
First Round
PFQ	(India) S Dey	17	21	13
Q1	(India) K G Kumar	21	14	21
(China) Qiao B	19	21	21
(Malaysia) Lee Z J	21	15	15
5	(India) Prannoy H. S.	4	6
Q4	(India) S Jaiswal	21	21
(Denmark) H-K Vittinghus	14	18
(India) Parupalli K	21	21

Second Round
Q1	(India) K G Kumar	7	3
(China) Qiao B	21	21
Q4	(India) S Jaiswal	21	19	12
(India) Parupalli K	19	21	21

Quarterfinals
(China) Qiao B	21	21
(India) Parupalli K	16	18

==== Section 2 ====
First Round
3	(Chinese Taipei) Chou T-c	21	21
(Denmark) R Gemke	16	15
Q3	(Malaysia) Liew D	21	16	23
(Israel) M Zilberman	18	21	21
8	(India) B. Sai Praneeth	21	17	21
(England) R Ouseph	11	21	17
(Thailand) T Saensomboonsuk	15	19
(Hong Kong) Hu Y	21	21

Second Round
3	(Chinese Taipei) Chou T-c	21	17	21
Q3	(Malaysia) Liew D	19	21	6
8	(India) B. Sai Praneeth	21	21
(Hong Kong) Hu Y	10	15

Quarterfinals
3	(Chinese Taipei) Chou T-c	21	21
8	(India) B. Sai Praneeth	15	13

=== Bottom half ===
==== Section 3 ====
First Round
PFQ	(Russia) V Malkov	21	25
(Hong Kong) Wei N	19	23
(China) Zhao JP	8	17
6	(Chinese Taipei) Wang T-w	21	21
PFQ	(Thailand) P Thongnuam	14	21	13
(Chinese Taipei) Hsu J-h	21	14	21
(India) So Verma	19	11
4	(China) Shi YQ	21	21

Second Round
PFQ	(Russia) V Malkov	21	18	12
6	(Chinese Taipei) Wang T-w	19	21	21
(Chinese Taipei) Hsu J-h	10	17
4	(China) Shi YQ	21	21

Quarterfinals
6	(Chinese Taipei) Wang T-w	13	12
4	(China) Shi YQ	21	21

==== Section 4 ====
First Round
(Indonesia) T Sugiarto	2
(India) A Jayaram	0^{r}
(India) Sa Verma	22	21
7	(Denmark) A Antonsen	20	8
(Denmark) E Holst	15	17
Q2	(Malaysia) I Zulkarnain	21	21
(Hong Kong) Lee C Y	17	18
2	(India) S Kidambi	21	21

Second Round
(Indonesia) T Sugiarto	18	21	17
(India) Sa Verma	21	19	21
Q2	(Malaysia) I Zulkarnain	21	21
2	(India) S Kidambi	19	17

Quarterfinals
(India) Sa Verma	17	14
Q2	(Malaysia) I Zulkarnain	21	21

== Women's singles ==
=== Seeds ===
1. (India) P. V. Sindhu (final)
2. (Spain) Carolina Marín (quarterfinals)
3. (Thailand) Ratchanok Intanon (semifinals)
4. (India) Saina Nehwal (quarterfinals)
5. (United States) Zhang Beiwen (champion)
6. (Hong Kong) Cheung Ngan Yi (semifinals)
7. (Hong Kong) Yip Pui Yin (quarterfinals)
8. (Spain) Beatriz Corrales (quarterfinals)

=== Finals ===
Semifinals
1	(India) P. V. Sindhu	21	21
3	(Thailand) Ratchanok Intanon	13	15
5	(United States) Zhang Beiwen	14	21	21
6	(Hong Kong) Cheung Ngan Yi	21	12	19

Final
1	(India) P. V. Sindhu	18	21	20
5	(United States) Zhang Beiwen	21	11	22

=== Top half ===
==== Section 1 ====
First Round
1	(India) P. V. Sindhu	21	21
(Denmark) N K Rohde	10	13
(India) V Choudhari	19	15
(Bulgaria) L Zechiri	21	21
8	(Spain) B Corrales	20	21	21
Q4	(India) M Riya	22	18	12
Q2	(Denmark) A Hertz	17	10
(India) R S Gadde	21	21

Second Round
1	(India) P. V. Sindhu	21	21
(Bulgaria) L Zechiri	10	14
8	(Spain) B Corrales	21	21
(India) R S Gadde	19	16

Quarterfinals
1	(India) P. V. Sindhu	21	19	21
8	(Spain) B Corrales	12	21	11

==== Section 2 ====
First Round
3	(Thailand) R Intanon	21	21
(India) R Raje	4	6
(India) A Prabhudesai	21	18	14
Q1	(India) A Kashyap	14	21	21
7	(Hong Kong) Yip P Y	20	21	21
(India) R Das	22	13	12
(Switzerland) S Jaquet	19	16
(Indonesia) L A Mainaky	21	21

Second Round
3	(Thailand) R Intanon	21	21
Q1	(India) A Kashyap	11	12
7	(Hong Kong) Yip P Y	21	21
(Indonesia) L A Mainaky	13	14

Quarterfinals
3	(Thailand) R Intanon	21	21
7	(Hong Kong) Yip P Y	11	11

=== Bottom half ===
==== Section 3 ====
First Round
(India) M Agrey	16	21	21
(Israel) K Polikarpova	21	17	12
(India) V R Jakka	19	22	12
5	(United States) Zhang BW	21	20	21
(Denmark) L Kjærsfeldt	21	21
(India) R Karthik	12	14
(Denmark) S H Dahl	15	9
4	(India) S Nehwal	21	21

Second Round
(India) M Agrey	12	16
5	(United States) Zhang BW	21	21
(Denmark) L Kjærsfeldt	12	11
4	(India) S Nehwal	21	21

Quarterfinals
5	(United States) Zhang BW	21	21
4	(India) S Nehwal	10	13

==== Section 4 ====
First Round
(Thailand) T Poopradubsil	21	16	21
(India) S K P Kudaravalli	17	21	15
(India) S Rane	14	5
6	(Hong Kong) Cheung N Y	21	21
(India) S U R Chukka	13	9
(China) Gao FJ	21	21
Q3	(Thailand) M Hemrachatanun	15	11
2	(Spain) C Marín	21	21

Second Round
(Thailand) T Poopradubsil	4	7
6	(Hong Kong) Cheung N Y	21	21
(China) Gao FJ	21	15	11
2	(Spain) C Marín	13	21	21

Quarterfinals
6	(Hong Kong) Cheung N Y	21	21
2	(Spain) C Marín	12	19

== Men's doubles ==
=== Seeds ===
1. (Indonesia) Marcus Fernaldi Gideon / Kevin Sanjaya Sukamuljo (champions)
2. (Denmark) Mathias Boe / Carsten Mogensen (second round)
3. (Chinese Taipei) Lu Ching-yao / Yang Po-han (second round)
4. (Denmark) Kim Astrup / Anders Skaarup Rasmussen (final)
5. (Denmark) Mathias Christiansen / David Daugaard (first round)
6. (Malaysia) Ong Yew Sin / Teo Ee Yi (withdrew)
7. (Indonesia) Angga Pratama / Rian Agung Saputro (quarterfinals)
8. (China) He Jiting / Tan Qiang (quarterfinals)

=== Finals ===
Semifinals
1	(Indonesia) Marcus Fernaldi Gideon (Indonesia) Kevin Sanjaya Sukamuljo	21	21
(Indonesia) Mohammad Ahsan (Indonesia) Hendra Setiawan	11	16
4	(Denmark) Kim Astrup (Denmark) Anders Skaarup Rasmussen	21	21
(China) Han Chengkai (China) Zhou Haodong	19	14

Final
1	(Indonesia) Marcus Fernaldi Gideon (Indonesia) Kevin Sanjaya Sukamuljo	21	21
4	(Denmark) Kim Astrup (Denmark) Anders Skaarup Rasmussen	14	16

=== Top half ===
==== Section 1 ====
First Round
1	(Indonesia) M F Gideon (Indonesia) K S Sukamuljo	21	21
(Denmark) K Antonsen (Denmark) N Nøhr	13	16
(Thailand) T Isriyanet (Thailand) K Namdash	21	21
(India) A George (India) S Shukla	17	15
PFQ	(India) A Kumar (India) J Yadav	7	13
(India) M Attri (India) B. S Reddy	21	21
PFQ	(India) H Malik (India) S Malik	11	14
Q1	(India) T Sharma (India) C Tripathi	21	21

Second Round
1	(Indonesia) M F Gideon (Indonesia) K S Sukamuljo	21	28
(Thailand) T Isriyanet (Thailand) K Namdash	18	26
(India) M Attri (India) B. S Reddy	21	21
Q1	(India) T Sharma (India) C Tripathi	11	15

Quarterfinals
1	(Indonesia) M F Gideon (Indonesia) K S Sukamuljo	21	21
(India) M Attri (India) B. S Reddy	19	19

==== Section 2 ====
First Round
3	(Chinese Taipei) Lu C-y (Chinese Taipei) Yang P-h	21	21
(India) K Chaudhary (India) B Yadav	9	8
Q2	(India) K P Garaga (India) D Kapila	23	9
(Indonesia) M Ahsan (Indonesia) H Setiawan	25	21
5	(Denmark) M Christiansen (Denmark) D Daugaard	21	21	19
(China) Chai B (China) Wang ZK	23	9	21
(India) S Rankireddy (India) C Shetty	21	21
(Hong Kong) Chang T C (Hong Kong) Mak H C	18	14

Second Round
3	(Chinese Taipei) Lu C-y (Chinese Taipei) Yang P-h	15	10
(Indonesia) M Ahsan (Indonesia) H Setiawan	21	21
(China) Chai B (China) Wang ZK	13	21	22
(India) S Rankireddy (India) C Shetty	21	18	20

Quarterfinals
(Indonesia) M Ahsan (Indonesia) H Setiawan	21	21
(China) Chai B (China) Wang ZK	10	19

=== Bottom half ===
==== Section 3 ====
First Round
(India) U Arora (India) S Bora	19	21	21
PFQ	(India) K Chahal (India) G Deswal	21	9	18
PFQ	(India) V Chawat (India) R Raturi	5	9
8	(China) He JT (China) Tan Q	21	21
Q3	(India) A Francis (India) N Kidambi	21	21
(India) B Chakraborty (India) A Nair	9	12
(India) Arjun M.R. (India) R Shlok	21	18	14
4	(Denmark) K Astrup (Denmark) A S Rasmussen	16	21	21

Second Round
(India) U Arora (India) S Bora	13	14
8	(China) He JT (China) Tan Q	21	21
Q3	(India) A Francis (India) N Kidambi	13	10
4	(Denmark) K Astrup (Denmark) A S Rasmussen	21	21

Quarterfinals
8	(China) He JT (China) Tan Q	14	13
4	(Denmark) K Astrup (Denmark) A S Rasmussen	21	21

==== Section 4 ====
First Round
(Malaysia) Shia C K (Malaysia) Tan W G	21	11	21
Q4	(India) R Kapoor (India) S Sharma	15	21	15
(India) M. A Raju (India) V G Prasad	11	10
7	(Indonesia) A Pratama (Indonesia) R A Saputro	21	21
(China) Han CK (China) Zhou HD	21	21
PFQ	(India) T Kona (India) S Sharma	14	16
(United States) P Chew (United States) R Chew	15	4
2	(Denmark) M Boe (Denmark) C Mogensen	21	21

Second Round
(Malaysia) Shia C K (Malaysia) Tan W G	20	17
7	(Indonesia) A Pratama (Indonesia) R A Saputro	22	21
(China) Han CK (China) Zhou HD	12	23	21
2	(Denmark) M Boe (Denmark) C Mogensen	21	21	14

Quarterfinals
7	(Indonesia) A Pratama (Indonesia) R A Saputro	19	19
(China) Han CK (China) Zhou HD	21	21

== Women's doubles ==
=== Seeds ===
1. (Denmark) Kamilla Rytter Juhl / Christinna Pedersen (semifinals)
2. (Thailand) Jongkolphan Kititharakul / Rawinda Prajongjai (final)
3. (Indonesia) Greysia Polii / Apriyani Rahayu (champions)
4. (Thailand) Chayanit Chaladchalam / Phataimas Muenwong (second round)
5. (Indonesia) Della Destiara Haris / Rizki Amelia Pradipta (quarterfinals)
6. (India) Ashwini Ponnappa / N. Sikki Reddy (quarterfinals)
7. (India) Meghana Jakkampudi / Poorvisha S Ram (quarterfinals)
8. (Thailand) Kittipak Dubthuk / Natcha Saengchote (quarterfinals)

=== Finals ===
Semifinals
1	(Denmark) Kamilla Rytter Juhl (Denmark) Christinna Pedersen	14	21	18
3	(Indonesia) Greysia Polii (Indonesia) Apriyani Rahayu	21	19	21
(China) Du Yue (China) Li Yinhui	19	17
2	(Thailand) Jongkolphan Kititharakul (Thailand) Rawinda Prajongjai	21	21

Final
3	(Indonesia) Greysia Polii (Indonesia) Apriyani Rahayu	21	21
2	(Thailand) Jongkolphan Kititharakul (Thailand) Rawinda Prajongjai	18	15

=== Top half ===
==== Section 1 ====
First Round
1	(Denmark) K R Juhl (Denmark) C Pedersen	21	21
(India) H M Harinarayanan (India) M Riya	11	7
(India) D Nair (India) A Roy	3	9
Q2	(China) Cao TW (China) Zheng Y	21	21
8	(Thailand) K Dubthuk (Thailand) N Saengchote	21	21
(India) S Pujari (India) M Sinha	8	14
(India) S Singhi (India) R Thaker	7	8
Q3	(China) Dong WJ (China) Feng XY	21	21

Second Round
1	(Denmark) K R Juhl (Denmark) C Pedersen	21	21
Q2	(China) Cao TW (China) Zheng Y	11	16
8	(Thailand) K Dubthuk (Thailand) N Saengchote	21	22
Q3	(China) Dong WJ (China) Feng XY	17	20

Quarterfinals
1	(Denmark) K R Juhl (Denmark) C Pedersen	21	21
8	(Thailand) K Dubthuk (Thailand) N Saengchote	11	13

==== Section 2 ====
First Round
3	(Indonesia) G Polii (Indonesia) A Rahayu	21	21
(India) H Veludurthi (India) K Wadkar	6	9
(Hong Kong) Ng W Y (Hong Kong) Yeung N T	21	21
(India) K Garg (India) N B Hazarika	16	7
5	(Indonesia) D D Haris (Indonesia) R A Pradipta	21	21
(India) D Choudhary (India) D Gupta	8	9
(India) J. A Kowsar (India) A Saraboji	7	2
(Malaysia) Lim C S (Malaysia) Teoh M X	21	21

Second Round
3	(Indonesia) G Polii (Indonesia) A Rahayu	21	22
(Hong Kong) Ng W Y (Hong Kong) Yeung N T	19	20
5	(Indonesia) D D Haris (Indonesia) R A Pradipta	21	21
(Malaysia) Lim C S (Malaysia) Teoh M X	6	15

Quarterfinals
3	(Indonesia) G Polii (Indonesia) A Rahayu	21	21
5	(Indonesia) D D Haris (Indonesia) R A Pradipta	16	9

=== Bottom half ===
==== Section 3 ====
First Round
PFQ	(India) M M Bora (India) S Saikia	21	21
(India) D Hazarika (India) P Naqvi	16	19
Q1	(India) S Christian (India) R Gajjar	9	11
6	(India) A Ponnappa (India) N. S Reddy	21	21
(China) Du Y (China) Li YH	21	21
(India) R Anand (India) A Kaushik	2	2
(India) J Dewangan (India) A Kashyap	13	4
4	(Thailand) C Chaladchalam (Thailand) P Muenwong	21	21

Second Round
PFQ	(India) M M Bora (India) S Saikia	9	2
6	(India) A Ponnappa (India) N. S Reddy	21	21
(China) Du Y (China) Li YH	21	24
4	(Thailand) C Chaladchalam (Thailand) P Muenwong	18	22

Quarterfinals
6	(India) A Ponnappa (India) N. S Reddy	17	21
(China) Du Y (China) Li YH	21	23

==== Section 4 ====
First Round
(India) S Chowdhary (India) A Goel	2	12
Q4	(India) R Panda (India) M Umakant	21	21
(India) S Sharma (India) M Yadav	12	12
7	(India) M Jakkampudi (India) P S Ram	21	21
(India) A Balan (India) Sruthi K.P	21	21
(United States) A Lee (United States) S Lee	13	2
(India) S Ghorpade (India) P Sawant	18	11
2	(Thailand) J Kititharakul (Thailand) R Prajongjai	21	21

Second Round
Q4	(India) R Panda (India) M Umakant	12	18
7	(India) M Jakkampudi (India) P S Ram	21	21
(India) A Balan (India) Sruthi K.P	17	5
2	(Thailand) J Kititharakul (Thailand) R Prajongjai	21	21

Quarterfinals
7	(India) M Jakkampudi (India) P S Ram	10	15
2	(Thailand) J Kititharakul (Thailand) R Prajongjai	21	21

== Mixed doubles ==
=== Seeds ===
1. (Indonesia) Tontowi Ahmad / Liliyana Natsir (withdrew)
2. (England) Chris Adcock / Gabrielle Adcock (withdrew)
3. (Malaysia) Tan Kian Meng / Lai Pei Jing (second round)
4. (Malaysia) Goh Soon Huat / Shevon Jemie Lai (quarterfinals)
5. (Denmark) Mathias Christiansen / Christina Pedersen (champions)
6. (China) He Jiting / Du Yue (semifinals)
7. (Malaysia) Chan Peng Soon / Goh Liu Ying (first round)
8. (India) Pranaav Jerry Chopra / N. Sikki Reddy (semifinals)

=== Finals ===
Semifinals
8	(India) Pranaav Jerry Chopra (India) N. Sikki Reddy	16	19
5	(Denmark) Mathias Christiansen (Denmark) Christinna Pedersen	21	21
6	(China) He Jiting (China) Du Yue	19	22
(Indonesia) Praveen Jordan (Indonesia) Melati Daeva Oktavianti	21	24

Final
5	(Denmark) Mathias Christiansen (Denmark) Christinna Pedersen	21	21
(Indonesia) Praveen Jordan (Indonesia) Melati Daeva Oktavianti	14	15

=== Top half ===
==== Section 1 ====
First Round
PFQ	(India) G Deswal (India) A Kashyap	21	21
(India) N Dua (India) T Samantaray	15	18
(India) T Sharma (India) S Sharma	6	14
(China) Han CK (China) Cao TW	21	21
8	(India) P J Chopra (India) N. S Reddy	16	21	21
(Indonesia) H Faizal (Indonesia) G E Widjaja	21	17	17
(Malaysia) Y Khrishnan (India) P Sawant	21	21
Q4	(India) V Devlekar (India) H Veludurthi	17	10

Second Round
PFQ	(India) G Deswal (India) A Kashyap	9	10
(China) Han CK (China) Cao TW	21	21
8	(India) P J Chopra (India) N. S Reddy	21	21
(Malaysia) Y Khrishnan (India) P Sawant	10	19

Quarterfinals
(China) Han CK (China) Cao TW	13	8
8	(India) P J Chopra (India) N. S Reddy	21	21

==== Section 2 ====
First Round
3	(Malaysia) Tan K M (Malaysia) Lai P J	21	21
(India) S Sharma (India) A Parikh	13	14
(India) S Rankireddy (India) A Ponnappa	21	21
Q1	(India) R M Rehan (India) J. A Kowsar	9	10
5	(Denmark) M Christiansen (Denmark) C Pedersen	21	21
(China) Wang ZK (China) Feng XY	18	14
(India) R Kapoor (India) K Garg	21	21
(Indonesia) Y F Mainaky (Indonesia) L A Mainaky	16	13

Second Round
3	(Malaysia) Tan K M (Malaysia) Lai P J	16	21	21
(India) S Rankireddy (India) A Ponnappa	21	15	23
5	(Denmark) M Christiansen (Denmark) C Pedersen	21	21
(India) R Kapoor (India) K Garg	10	11

Quarterfinals
(India) S Rankireddy (India) A Ponnappa	17	11
5	(Denmark) M Christiansen (Denmark) C Pedersen	21	21

=== Bottom half ===
==== Section 3 ====
First Round
(Thailand) N Phuangphuapet (Thailand) J Kititharakul	21	21
(Indonesia) K M Sugiarto (Indonesia) M D Giovani	8	7
(Denmark) N Nøhr (Denmark) S Thygesen	21	17	16
6	(China) He JT (China) Du Y	16	21	21
(India) V G Prasad (India) J Dewangan	4	8
Q3	(India) S Sharma (India) P S Ram	21	21
(Denmark) A S Rasmussen (Denmark) L Kjærsfeldt	14	16
4	(Malaysia) Goh S H (Malaysia) S J Lai	21	21

Second Round
(Thailand) N Phuangphuapet (Thailand) J Kititharakul	14	13
6	(China) He JT (China) Du Y	21	21
Q3	(India) S Sharma (India) P S Ram	10	16
4	(Malaysia) Goh S H (Malaysia) S J Lai	21	21

Quarterfinals
6	(China) He JT (China) Du Y	21	21
4	(Malaysia) Goh S H (Malaysia) S J Lai	11	19

==== Section 4 ====
First Round
(Indonesia) R K Suwardi (Indonesia) D Susanto	21	16	21
(Hong Kong) Mak H C (Hong Kong) Yeung N T	16	21	14
(Indonesia) P Jordan (Indonesia) M D Oktavianti	12	21	21
7	(Malaysia) Chan P S (Malaysia) Goh L Y	21	15	15
Q2	(India) Siddharth. (India) J Nashier	5	8
(Russia) E Dremin (Russia) E Dimova	21	21
(Hong Kong) Chang T C (Hong Kong) Ng W Y	21	21
PFQ	(India) K Sharma (India) S Panchal	11	12

Second Round
(Indonesia) R K Suwardi (Indonesia) D Susanto	19	19
(Indonesia) P Jordan (Indonesia) M D Oktavianti	21	21
(Russia) E Dremin (Russia) E Dimova	21	21
(Hong Kong) Chang T C (Hong Kong) Ng W Y	19	12

Quarterfinals
(Indonesia) P Jordan (Indonesia) M D Oktavianti	21	21
(Russia) E Dremin (Russia) E Dimova	17	12

Preceded by 2017 India Super Series	India Open	Succeeded by 2019 India Open
Preceded by 2018 Indonesia Masters	BWF World Tour; 2018 BWF season	Succeeded by 2018 Swiss Open
