= 2019 India Open =

Badminton tournament in New Delhi

Tournament details
- Dates: 26–31 March
- Level: Super 500
- Total prize money: US$350,000
- Venue: K. D. Jadhav Indoor Hall
- Location: New Delhi, India

Champions
- Men's singles: (Denmark) Viktor Axelsen
- Women's singles: (Thailand) Ratchanok Intanon
- Men's doubles: (Chinese Taipei) Lee Yang (Chinese Taipei) Wang Chi-lin
- Women's doubles: (Indonesia) Greysia Polii (Indonesia) Apriyani Rahayu
- Mixed doubles: (China) Wang Yilü (China) Huang Dongping

The 2019 India Open, officially known as the Yonex-Sunrise India Open 2019 for sponsorship reasons, was a badminton tournament which took place at K. D. Jadhav Indoor Hall in India from 26 to 31 March 2019 and had a total purse of $350,000.

== Tournament ==
The 2019 India Open was the eighth tournament of the 2019 BWF World Tour and also part of the India Open championships, which had been held since 2008. This tournament was organized by the Badminton Association of India with sanction from the BWF.

=== Venue ===
This international tournament was held at K. D. Jadhav Indoor Hall in New Delhi, India.

=== Point distribution ===
Below is the point distribution table for each phase of the tournament based on the BWF points system for the BWF World Tour Super 500 event.

Winner	Runner-up	3/4	5/8	9/16	17/32	33/64	65/128
9,200	7,800	6,420	5,040	3,600	2,220	880	430

=== Prize money ===
The total prize money for this tournament was US$350,000. Distribution of prize money was in accordance with BWF regulations.

Event	Winner	Finals	Semi-finals	Quarter-finals	Last 16
Singles	$26,250	$13,300	$5,075	$2,100	$1,225
Doubles	$27,650	$13,300	$4,900	$2,537.50	$1,312.50

== Men's singles ==
=== Seeds ===
1. (China) Shi Yuqi (withdrew)
2. (Denmark) Viktor Axelsen (champion)
3. (India) Srikanth Kidambi (final)
4. (Indonesia) Tommy Sugiarto (first round)
5. (India) Sameer Verma (second round)
6. (Hong Kong) Ng Ka Long (withdrew)
7. (Thailand) Khosit Phetpradab (quarter-finals)
8. (Thailand) Kantaphon Wangcharoen (first round)

=== Finals ===
Semi-finals
(China) Huang Yuxiang	21	14	19
3	(India) Srikanth Kidambi	16	21	21
(India) Parupalli Kashyap	11	17
2	(Denmark) Viktor Axelsen	21	21

Final
3	(India) Srikanth Kidambi	7	20
2	(Denmark) Viktor Axelsen	21	22

=== Top half ===
==== Section 1 ====
First Round
PFQ	(India) K A Walter	16	16
(China) Huang YX	21	21
(France) B Leverdez	21	15	21
(China) Zhou ZQ	18	21	9
7	(Thailand) K Phetpradab	21	21
Q1	(India) K Jindal	17	8
(Thailand) S Thammasin	21	21
(India) R. M. V. Gurusaidutt	18	11

Second Round
(China) Huang YX	21	21
(France) B Leverdez	8	15
7	(Thailand) K Phetpradab	21	12	21
(Thailand) S Thammasin	19	21	18

Quarter-finals
(China) Huang YX	21	21
7	(Thailand) K Phetpradab	16	15

==== Section 2 ====
First Round
3	(India) S Kidambi	21	18	21
(Hong Kong) Wong W K	16	21	19
(China) Zhao JP	10	22	14
(China) Lu GZ	21	20	21
5	(India) Sa Verma	21	21
(Denmark) R Gemke	18	12
(India) B. Sai Praneeth	22	21	21
Q4	(India) K Gulshan Kumar	24	13	8

Second Round
3	(India) S Kidambi	21	21
(China) Lu GZ	11	16
5	(India) Sa Verma	21	16	15
(India) B. Sai Praneeth	18	21	21

Quarter-finals
3	(India) S Kidambi	21	21	21
(India) B. Sai Praneeth	23	11	19

=== Bottom half ===
==== Section 3 ====
First Round
(Hong Kong) Lee C Y	21	18	10
(India) Parupalli K	14	21	21
(Thailand) T Saensomboonsuk	21	21
PFQ	(Malaysia) Goh G C	16	16
(Chinese Taipei) Wang T-w	21	21
(India) A Jayaram	15	18
(India) S Dey	14	22	21
4	(Indonesia) T Sugiarto	21	20	11

Second Round
(India) Parupalli K	21	21
(Thailand) T Saensomboonsuk	11	13
(Chinese Taipei) Wang T-w	21	21
(India) S Dey	16	13

Quarter-finals
(India) Parupalli K	21	21
(Chinese Taipei) Wang T-w	16	11

==== Section 4 ====
First Round
Q2	(India) R Y Chittaboina	14	6
(Denmark) J Ø. Jørgensen	21	21
(India) Prannoy K	14	21	21
8	(Thailand) K Wangcharoen	21	18	14
Q3	(India) S Thakur	21	11	7
(Thailand) S Avihingsanon	15	21	21
(Israel) M Zilberman	13	16
2	(Denmark) V Axelsen	21	21

Second Round
(Denmark) J Ø. Jørgensen	19	22	17
(India) Prannoy K	21	20	21
(Thailand) S Avihingsanon	11	9
2	(Denmark) V Axelsen	21	21

Quarter-finals
(India) Prannoy K	10	16
2	(Denmark) V Axelsen	21	21

== Women's singles ==
=== Seeds ===
1. (China) Chen Yufei (withdrew)
2. (India) P. V. Sindhu (semi-finals)
3. (China) He Bingjiao (final)
4. (Thailand) Ratchanok Intanon (champion)
5. (India) Saina Nehwal (withdrew)
6. (United States) Zhang Beiwen (quarter-finals)
7. (China) Han Yue (semi-finals)
8. (Denmark) Mia Blichfeldt (quarter-finals)

=== Finals ===
Semi-finals
7	(China) Han Yue	15	21	18
4	(Thailand) Ratchanok Intanon	21	19	21
3	(China) He Bingjiao	23	21
2	(India) P. V. Sindhu	21	18

Final
4	(Thailand) Ratchanok Intanon	21	21
3	(China) He Bingjiao	15	14

=== Top half ===
==== Section 1 ====
First Round
PFQ	(United States) I Zhong	21	13	8
(United States) D Gupta	19	21	21
(Hong Kong) Cheung N Y	21	21
(Spain) B Corrales	9	9
7	(China) Han Y	21	21
Q2	(India) V Choudhari	12	6
(India) V Gummadi	21	20	12
(Thailand) C Jucharoen	17	22	21

Second Round
(United States) D Gupta	7	8
(Hong Kong) Cheung N Y	21	21
7	(China) Han Y	21	21
(Thailand) C Jucharoen	13	8

Quarter-finals
(Hong Kong) Cheung N Y	20	14
7	(China) Han Y	22	21

==== Section 2 ====
First Round
4	(Thailand) R Intanon	21	21
(India) S U R Chukka	9	6
(Indonesia) Y Y Susanto	15	11
(China) Chen XX	21	21
PFQ	(Egypt) H Hosny	8	11
(China) Cai YY	21	21
(Hong Kong) Yip P Y	8	7
(Thailand) B Ongbamrungphan	21	21

Second Round
4	(Thailand) R Intanon	21	21
(China) Chen XX	18	11
(China) Cai YY	21	12	18
(Thailand) B Ongbamrungphan	19	21	21

Quarter-finals
4	(Thailand) R Intanon	21	21
(Thailand) B Ongbamrungphan	18	19

=== Bottom half ===
==== Section 3 ====
First Round
PFQ	(India) A Prabhudesai	21	22	10
(Canada) B Tam	18	24	21
(Israel) K Polikarpova	19	6
6	(United States) Zhang BW	21	21
(Thailand) N Jindapol	17	11
(China) Li XR	21	21
Q4	(India) P Joshi	12	15
3	(China) He BJ	21	21

Second Round
(Canada) B Tam	6	16
6	(United States) Zhang BW	21	21
(China) Li XR	18	17
3	(China) He BJ	21	21

Quarter-finals
6	(United States) Zhang BW	18	24
3	(China) He BJ	21	26

==== Section 4 ====
First Round
(Thailand) P Chaiwan	17	15
Q3	(India) R Mookerjee	21	21
Q1	(India) R Thaker	6	14
8	(Denmark) M Blichfeldt	21	21
(Indonesia) L A Mainaky	12	13
(Hong Kong) Deng X	21	21
(India) M Agrey	8	13
2	(India) P. V. Sindhu	21	21

Second Round
Q3	(India) R Mookerjee	8	21	13
8	(Denmark) M Blichfeldt	21	17	21
(Hong Kong) Deng X	11	13
2	(India) P. V. Sindhu	21	21

Quarter-finals
8	(Denmark) M Blichfeldt	19	20
2	(India) P. V. Sindhu	21	22

== Men's doubles ==
=== Seeds ===
1. (Denmark) Kim Astrup / Anders Skaarup Rasmussen (semi-finals)
2. (Malaysia) Goh V Shem / Tan Wee Kiong (first round)
3. (India) Satwiksairaj Rankireddy / Chirag Shetty (withdrew)
4. (Russia) Vladimir Ivanov / Ivan Sozonov (first round)
5. (China) Ou Xuanyi / Ren Xiangyu (quarter-finals)
6. (India) Manu Attri / B. Sumeeth Reddy (semi-finals)
7. (Malaysia) Mohamad Arif Abdul Latif / Nur Mohd Azriyn Ayub (quarter-finals)
8. (Thailand) Bodin Isara / Maneepong Jongjit (withdrew)

=== Finals ===
Semi-finals
1	(Denmark) Kim Astrup (Denmark) Anders Skaarup Rasmussen	12	18
(Chinese Taipei) Lee Yang (Chinese Taipei) Wang Chi-lin	21	21
6	(India) Manu Attri (India) B. Sumeeth Reddy	12	17
(Indonesia) Ricky Karanda Suwardi (Indonesia) Angga Pratama	21	21

Final
(Chinese Taipei) Lee Yang (Chinese Taipei) Wang Chi-lin	21	21
(Indonesia) Ricky Karanda Suwardi (Indonesia) Angga Pratama	14	14

=== Top half ===
==== Section 1 ====
First Round
1	(Denmark) K Astrup (Denmark) A S Rasmussen	21	21
(Russia) D Grachev (Russia) P Kotsarenko	14	14
(Malaysia) Goh S F (Malaysia) N Izzuddin	21	21
PFQ	(India) V Chawat (India) P S Couhan	8	11
PFQ	(India) P Chaturvedi (India) T Sharma	13	17
(Thailand) T Isriyanet (Thailand) K Namdash	21	21
(India) K Chaudhary (India) S Yadav	21	15	21
(India) B Chakraborty (India) G Deswal	12	21	16

Second Round
1	(Denmark) K Astrup (Denmark) A S Rasmussen	21	21
(Malaysia) Goh S F (Malaysia) N Izzuddin	14	7
(Thailand) T Isriyanet (Thailand) K Namdash	21	21
(India) K Chaudhary (India) S Yadav	15	14

Quarter-finals
1	(Denmark) K Astrup (Denmark) A S Rasmussen	21	21
(Thailand) T Isriyanet (Thailand) K Namdash	18	15

==== Section 2 ====
First Round
4	(Russia) V Ivanov (Russia) I Sozonov	21	21	19
(Chinese Taipei) Lee Y (Chinese Taipei) Wang C-l	19	23	21
(Malaysia) Chooi K M (Malaysia) Low J S	21	21
(India) A Nair (India) V G Prasad	9	9
5	(China) Ou XY (China) Ren XY	21	21
(India) K Chahal (India) S Malik	14	14
(India) S Jakhar (India) P Malik	12	23	14
(India) V K H Ranganatha (India) A Surya	21	21	21

Second Round
(Chinese Taipei) Lee Y (Chinese Taipei) Wang C-l	18	21	21
(Malaysia) Chooi K M (Malaysia) Low J S	21	14	13
5	(China) Ou XY (China) Ren XY	21	21
(India) V K H Ranganatha (India) A Surya	12	11

Quarter-finals
(Chinese Taipei) Lee Y (Chinese Taipei) Wang C-l	21	21
5	(China) Ou XY (China) Ren XY	10	17

=== Bottom half ===
==== Section 3 ====
First Round
(India) Arjun M. R. (India) R Shlok	16	18
(China) Huang KX (China) Wang ZK	21	21
Q4	(India) Ravi (India) L Saroha	14	7
6	(India) M Attri (India) B. S Reddy	21	21
Q1	(India) P Chopra (India) Sh Sharma	21	21
Q2	(India) S V Govindarasu (India) V Venkatachalam	13	13
(India) A Mayekar (India) Singh V K	21	14	21
PFQ	(India) S Kunwar Ishan (India) C Tripathi	15	21	13

Second Round
(China) Huang KX (China) Wang ZK	23	18
6	(India) M Attri (India) B. S Reddy	25	21
Q1	(India) P Chopra (India) Sh Sharma	21	21
(India) A Mayekar (India) Singh V K	15	11

Quarter-finals
6	(India) M Attri (India) B. S Reddy	21	21
Q1	(India) P Chopra (India) Sh Sharma	10	12

==== Section 4 ====
First Round
(India) A George (India) S Shukla	16	14
(United States) P Chew (United States) R Chew	21	21
(India) H Malik (India) P Nathani	10	8
7	(Malaysia) M Arif A L (Malaysia) N M Azriyn A	21	21
(India) D Khatri (India) R Raturi	19	20
Q3	(India) M Elumalai (India) V Vasudevan	21	22
(Indonesia) R Karanda Suwardi (Indonesia) A Pratama	17	23	21
2	(Malaysia) Goh V S (Malaysia) Tan W K	21	21	19

Second Round
(United States) P Chew (United States) R Chew	21	18	18
7	(Malaysia) M Arif A L (Malaysia) N M Azriyn A	19	21	21
Q3	(India) M Elumalai (India) V Vasudevan	9	17
(Indonesia) R Karanda Suwardi (Indonesia) A Pratama	21	21

Quarter-finals
7	(Malaysia) M Arif A L (Malaysia) N M Azriyn A	18	21	17
(Indonesia) R Karanda Suwardi (Indonesia) A Pratama	21	14	21

== Women's doubles ==
=== Seeds ===
1. (Indonesia) Greysia Polii / Apriyani Rahayu (champions)
2. (Thailand) Jongkolphan Kititharakul / Rawinda Prajongjai (semi-finals)
3. (Malaysia) Chow Mei Kuan / Lee Meng Yean (final)
4. (Malaysia) Vivian Hoo / Yap Cheng Wen (quarter-finals)
5. (Thailand) Puttita Supajirakul / Sapsiree Taerattanachai (withdrew)
6. (China) Li Wenmei / Zheng Yu (first round)
7. (Indonesia) Ni Ketut Mahadewi Istarani / Rizki Amelia Pradipta (first round)
8. (Thailand) Chayanit Chaladchalam / Phataimas Muenwong (quarter-finals)

=== Finals ===
Semi-finals
1	(Indonesia) Greysia Polii (Indonesia) Apriyani Rahayu	21	19	21
(Indonesia) Della Destiara Haris (Indonesia) Tania Oktaviani Kusumah	9	21	5
3	(Malaysia) Chow Mei Kuan (Malaysia) Lee Meng Yean	18	21	21
2	(Thailand) Jongkolphan Kititharakul (Thailand) Rawinda Prajongjai	21	19	19

Final
1	(Indonesia) Greysia Polii (Indonesia) Apriyani Rahayu	21	25
3	(Malaysia) Chow Mei Kuan (Malaysia) Lee Meng Yean	11	23

=== Top half ===
==== Section 1 ====
First Round
1	(Indonesia) G Polii (Indonesia) A Rahayu	21	21
(Chinese Taipei) Chang C-h (Chinese Taipei) Yang C-t	14	15
(India) S Singhi (India) R Thaker	16	12
Q1	(India) R Tulasi (India) S S Singh	21	21
6	(China) Li WM (China) Zheng Y	20	19
(India) A Ponnappa (India) N. S Reddy	22	21
(Thailand) P Chochuwong (Thailand) K Dubthuk	14	6
Q4	(China) Chen XF (China) Zhou CM	21	21

Second Round
1	(Indonesia) G Polii (Indonesia) A Rahayu	21	21
Q1	(India) R Tulasi (India) S S Singh	6	9
(India) A Ponnappa (India) N. S Reddy	21	21
Q4	(China) Chen XF (China) Zhou CM	18	14

Quarter-finals
1	(Indonesia) G Polii (Indonesia) A Rahayu	21	21
(India) A Ponnappa (India) N. S Reddy	10	18

==== Section 2 ====
First Round
4	(Malaysia) V Hoo (Malaysia) Yap C W	21	21
(United States) E Kan (United States) I Zhong	6	8
(India) P Dandu (India) S Santosh	21	21
Q3	(India) A K Jamaludeen (India) S Sharma	6	11
7	(Indonesia) N K M Istirani (Indonesia) R A Pradipta	16	18
(Indonesia) D D Haris (Indonesia) T O Kusumah	21	21
(China) Liu XX (China) Xia YT	21	21
(Indonesia) A S Awanda (Indonesia) P Z Bernadet	10	19

Second Round
4	(Malaysia) V Hoo (Malaysia) Yap C W	21	21
(India) P Dandu (India) S Santosh	11	15
(Indonesia) D D Haris (Indonesia) T O Kusumah	21	18	21
(China) Liu XX (China) Xia YT	15	21	16

Quarter-finals
4	(Malaysia) V Hoo (Malaysia) Yap C W	21	14	12
(Indonesia) D D Haris (Indonesia) T O Kusumah	16	21	21

=== Bottom half ===
==== Section 3 ====
First Round
(United States) A Lee (United States) S Lee	9	15
(Egypt) D Hany (Egypt) H Hosny	21	21
Q2	(India) M M Bora (India) M Sinha	8	10
8	(Thailand) C Chaladchalam (Thailand) P Muenwong	21	21
(China) Chen L (China) Xu Y	21	21
(India) S Christian (India) R Gajjar	7	4
(Hong Kong) Ng T Y (Hong Kong) Yuen S Y	18	21	17
3	(Malaysia) Chow M K (Malaysia) Lee M Y	21	19	21

Second Round
(Egypt) D Hany (Egypt) H Hosny	10	9
8	(Thailand) C Chaladchalam (Thailand) P Muenwong	21	21
(China) Chen L (China) Xu Y	18	10
3	(Malaysia) Chow M K (Malaysia) Lee M Y	21	21

Quarter-finals
8	(Thailand) C Chaladchalam (Thailand) P Muenwong	14	12
3	(Malaysia) Chow M K (Malaysia) Lee M Y	21	21

==== Section 4 ====
First Round
(Russia) E Bolotova (Russia) A Davletova	18	23	16
(Hong Kong) Ng W Y (Hong Kong) Yeung N T	21	21	21
(India) A Balan (India) Sruthi K. P.	21	21
PFQ	(India) R Jaiswal (India) A Kaushik	10	5
(Thailand) R Laisuan (Thailand) S Mingchua	21	21
(India) M Jakkampudi (India) P S. Ram	16	19
PFQ	(India) V V Belawadi (India) L L Rachapalli	2	7
2	(Thailand) J Kititharakul (Thailand) R Prajongjai	21	21

Second Round
(Hong Kong) Ng W Y (Hong Kong) Yeung N T	19	21	17
(India) A Balan (India) Sruthi K. P.	21	7	21
(Thailand) R Laisuan (Thailand) S Mingchua	10	18
2	(Thailand) J Kititharakul (Thailand) R Prajongjai	21	21

Quarter-finals
(India) A Balan (India) Sruthi K.P	8	11
2	(Thailand) J Kititharakul (Thailand) R Prajongjai	21	21

== Mixed doubles ==
=== Seeds ===
1. (China) Wang Yilyu / Huang Dongping (champions)
2. (Thailand) Dechapol Puavaranukroh / Sapsiree Taerattanachai (withdrew)
3. (Denmark) Mathias Christiansen / Christina Pedersen (withdrew)
4. (Indonesia) Hafiz Faizal / Gloria Emanuelle Widjaja (semi-finals)
5. (Indonesia) Praveen Jordan / Melati Daeva Oktavianti (final)
6. (China) Lu Kai / Chen Lu (second round)
7. (Thailand) Nipitphon Phuangphuapet / Savitree Amitrapai (quarter-finals)
8. (India) Satwiksairaj Rankireddy / Ashwini Ponnappa (withdrew)

=== Finals ===
Semi-finals
1	(China) Wang Yilyu (China) Huang Dongping	21	21
4	(Indonesia) Hafiz Faizal (Indonesia) Gloria Emanuelle Widjaja	13	16
(Chinese Taipei) Lee Yang (Chinese Taipei) Yang Ching-tun	9	21
5	(Indonesia) Praveen Jordan (Indonesia) Melati Daeva Oktavianti	21	23

Final
1	(China) Wang Yilyu (China) Huang Dongping	21	21
5	(Indonesia) Praveen Jordan (Indonesia) Melati Daeva Oktavianti	13	11

=== Top half ===
==== Section 1 ====
First Round
1	(China) Wang YL (China) Huang DP	21	21
(Israel) M Zilberman (Israel) S Zilberman	8	3
(India) U Arora (India) K Wadkar	15	14
(Indonesia) R Karanda Suwardi (Indonesia) P Z Bernadet	21	21
7	(Thailand) N Phuangphuapet (Thailand) S Amitrapai	21	21
Q3	(India) S Jakhar (India) D Gautam	8	8
(India) D Kapila (India) K Garg	13	12
(China) Ou XY (China) Chen XF	21	21

Second Round
1	(China) Wang YL (China) Huang DP	21	21
(Indonesia) R Karanda Suwardi (Indonesia) P Z Bernadeth	8	11
7	(Thailand) N Phuangphuapet (Thailand) S Amitrapai	21	15	21
(China) Ou XY (China) Chen XF	17	21	13

Quarter-finals
1	(China) Wang YL (China) Huang DP	21	21
7	(Thailand) N Phuangphuapet (Thailand) S Amitrapai	18	7

==== Section 2 ====
First Round
4	(Indonesia) H Faizal (Indonesia) G E Widjaja	21	21
Q2	(India) M R Raju (India) A K Jamaludeen	10	10
(Russia) D Grachev (Russia) E Bolotova	14	13
(India) P Chopra (India) N. S Reddy	21	21
6	(China) Lu K (China) Chen L	21	24
(Chinese Taipei) Wang C-l (Chinese Taipei) Cheng C-y	19	22
(Indonesia) T Ahmad (Indonesia) W O Kandow	w	/	o
(India) Sh Sharma (India) P S. Ram

Second Round
4	(Indonesia) H Faizal (Indonesia) G E Widjaja	19	21	21
(India) P Chopra (India) N. S Reddy	21	19	14
6	(China) Lu K (China) Chen L	11	19
(Indonesia) T Ahmad (Indonesia) W O Kandow	21	21

Quarter-finals
4	(Indonesia) H Faizal (Indonesia) G E Widjaja	21	21
(Indonesia) T Ahmad (Indonesia) W O Kandow	17	14

=== Bottom half ===
==== Section 3 ====
First Round
(China) Ren XY (China) Zhou CM	21	21
PFQ	(Indonesia) Y F Mainaky (Indonesia) L A Mainaky	10	11
(India) Arjun M. R. (India) K. Maneesha	21	21
PFQ	(India) B. S Reddy (India) P Dandu	15	15
(Hong Kong) Chang T C (Hong Kong) Ng W Y	21	21
(India) S. Sunjith Jr. (India) Sruthi K. P.	14	13
(Chinese Taipei) Lee Y (Chinese Taipei) Yang C-t	3
PFQ	(India) K Sharma (India) S Saikia	0^{r}

Second Round
(China) Ren XY (China) Zhou CM	21	21
(India) Arjun M. R. (India) K. Maneesha	16	17
(Hong Kong) Chang T C (Hong Kong) Ng W Y	18	16
(Chinese Taipei) Lee Y (Chinese Taipei) Yang C-t	21	21

Quarter-finals
(China) Ren XY (China) Zhou CM	16	17
(Chinese Taipei) Lee Y (Chinese Taipei) Yang C-t	21	21

==== Section 4 ====
First Round
Q1	(Hong Kong) Tang C M (Hong Kong) Ng T Y	w	/	o
Q4	(India) N Dua (India) Sar Sharma
(Thailand) P Thongnuam (Thailand) K Dubthuk	11^{r}
5	(Indonesia) P Jordan (Indonesia) M D Oktavianti	9
(India) Sau Sharma (India) A Parikh	21	21
(India) V G Prasad (India) J Dewangan	15	17
(Russia) R Alimov (Russia) A Davletova	21	21
PFQ	(India) G Deswal (India) D Choudhary	9	11

Second Round
Q1	(Hong Kong) Tang C M (Hong Kong) Ng T Y	18	15
5	(Indonesia) P Jordan (Indonesia) M D Oktavianti	21	21
(India) Sau Sharma (India) A Parikh	13	9
(Russia) R Alimov (Russia) A Davletova	21	21

Quarter-finals
5	(Indonesia) P Jordan (Indonesia) M D Oktavianti	19	22	21
(Russia) R Alimov (Russia) A Davletova	21	20	13

Preceded by 2018 India Open	India Open	Succeeded by 2022 India Open
Preceded by 2019 Orléans Masters	BWF World Tour; 2019 BWF season	Succeeded by 2019 Malaysia Open
