= Della Destiara Haris =

Indonesian badminton player (born 1992)

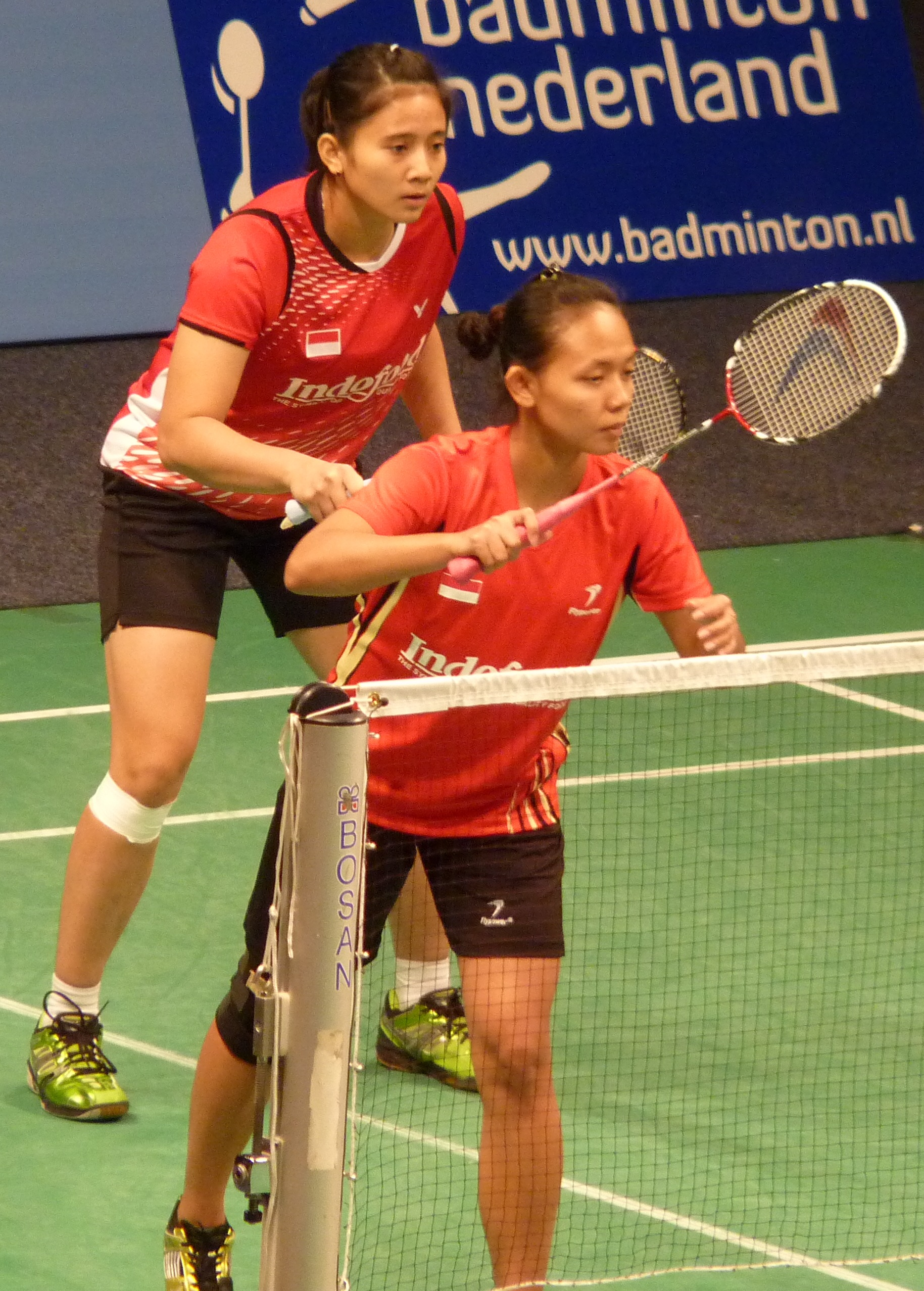

Personal information
- Born: 8 December 1992 (age 33) Jakarta, Indonesia
- Height: 1.70 m (5 ft 7 in)
- Weight: 55 kg (121 lb)

Sport
- Country: Indonesia
- Sport: Badminton
- Handedness: Right

Women's doubles
- Highest ranking: 9 (with Rizki Amelia Pradipta 5 July 2018)
- Current ranking: 31 (with Rizki Amelia Pradipta 5 July 2022)
- BWF profile
Medal record
Women's badminton
Representing Indonesia
Sudirman Cup
Bronze medal – third place	2015 Dongguan	Mixed team
Asian Games
Bronze medal – third place	2018 Jakarta–Palembang	Women's team
Asian Championships
Bronze medal – third place	2018 Wuhan	Women's doubles
Bronze medal – third place	2019 Wuhan	Women's doubles
Asia Mixed Team Championships
Bronze medal – third place	2019 Hong Kong	Mixed team
Asia Team Championships
Bronze medal – third place	2018 Alor Setar	Women's team
World Junior Championships
Silver medal – second place	2009 Alor Setar	Mixed doubles
Asian Junior Championships
Bronze medal – third place	2010 Kuala Lumpur	Mixed doubles
Bronze medal – third place	2010 Kuala Lumpur	Mixed team

Della Destiara Haris (born 8 December 1992) is an Indonesian badminton player affiliated with Jaya Raya Jakarta club. In the junior event, she was the mixed doubles silver medalist at the 2009 World Junior Championships, and also the mixed team and doubles bronze medalists at the 2010 Asian Junior Championships. She won her first international title in 2010 Indonesia International, and claimed her first Grand Prix title in 2016 Vietnam Open. Haris was two times Asian Championships bronze medalists winning in 2018 and 2019.

== Awards and nominations ==
Award	Year	Category	Result	Ref.
Indonesian Sport Awards	2018	Favorite Women's Team Athlete with 2018 Asian Games women's badminton team	Won	

== Achievements ==
=== Asian Championships ===
Women's doubles
Year	Venue	Partner	Opponent	Score	Result
2018	Wuhan Sports Center Gymnasium; Wuhan, China	(Indonesia) Rizki Amelia Pradipta	(Japan) Yuki Fukushima (Japan) Sayaka Hirota	29–27, 17–21, 11–21	Bronze
2019	Wuhan Sports Center Gymnasium; Wuhan, China	(Indonesia) Rizki Amelia Pradipta	(China) Chen Qingchen (China) Jia Yifan	20–22, 12–21	Bronze

=== BWF World Junior Championships ===
Mixed doubles
Year	Venue	Partner	Opponent	Score	Result
2009	Sultan Abdul Halim Stadium; Alor Setar, Malaysia	(Indonesia) Angga Pratama	(Thailand) Maneepong Jongjit (Thailand) Rodjana Chuthabunditkul	19–21, 21–14, 17–21	Silver

=== Asian Junior Championships ===
Mixed doubles
Year	Venue	Partner	Opponent	Score	Result
2010	Stadium Juara; Kuala Lumpur, Malaysia	(Indonesia) Ricky Karanda Suwardi	(Malaysia) Ow Yao Han (Malaysia) Lai Pei Jing	19–21, 19–21	Bronze

=== BWF World Tour (1 title, 1 runner-up) ===
The BWF World Tour, which was announced on 19 March 2017 and implemented in 2018, is a series of elite badminton tournaments sanctioned by the Badminton World Federation (BWF). The BWF World Tour is divided into levels of World Tour Finals, Super 1000, Super 750, Super 500, Super 300 (part of the HSBC World Tour), and the BWF Tour Super 100.

Women's doubles
Year	Tournament	Level	Partner	Opponent	Score	Result
2019	Vietnam Open	Super 100	(Indonesia) Rizki Amelia Pradipta	(China) Huang Jia (China) Zhang Shuxian	21–18, 21–17	(gold) Winner
2019	Indonesia Masters	Super 100	(Indonesia) Rizki Amelia Pradipta	(Indonesia) Siti Fadia Silva Ramadhanti (Indonesia) Ribka Sugiarto	21–23, 15–21	(silver) Runner-up

=== BWF Grand Prix (2 titles, 4 runners-up) ===
The BWF Grand Prix had two levels, the Grand Prix and Grand Prix Gold. It was a series of badminton tournaments sanctioned by the Badminton World Federation (BWF) and played between 2007 and 2017.

Women's doubles
Year	Tournament	Partner	Opponent	Score	Result
2012	Chinese Taipei Open	(Indonesia) Suci Rizky Andini	(Indonesia) Pia Zebadiah Bernadet (Indonesia) Rizki Amelia Pradipta	15–21, 12–21	(silver) Runner-up
2013	Dutch Open	(Indonesia) Anggia Shitta Awanda	(China) Bao Yixin (China) Tang Jinhua	15–21, 7–21	(silver) Runner-up
2015	German Open	(Indonesia) Rosyita Eka Putri Sari	(Denmark) Christinna Pedersen (Denmark) Kamilla Rytter Juhl	18–21, 21–17, 9–21	(silver) Runner-up
2016	Vietnam Open	(Indonesia) Rosyita Eka Putri Sari	(Indonesia) Tiara Rosalia Nuraidah (Indonesia) Rizki Amelia Pradipta	21–11, 21–15	(gold) Winner
2017	Vietnam Open	(Indonesia) Rizki Amelia Pradipta	(Thailand) Chayanit Chaladchalam (Thailand) Phataimas Muenwong	16–21, 19–21	(silver) Runner-up
2017	Dutch Open	(Indonesia) Rizki Amelia Pradipta	(Indonesia) Anggia Shitta Awanda (Indonesia) Ni Ketut Mahadewi Istarani	21–17, 21–16	(gold) Winner

BWF Grand Prix Gold tournament
BWF Grand Prix tournament

=== BWF International Challenge/Series (5 titles, 1 runner-up) ===
Women's doubles
Year	Tournament	Partner	Opponent	Score	Result
2009	Indonesia International	(Indonesia) Ni Made Claudia Ayu Wijaya	(Indonesia) Vita Marissa (Indonesia) Nadya Melati	20–22, 16–21	(silver) Runner-up
2010	Indonesia International	(Indonesia) Suci Rizky Andini	(Indonesia) Komala Dewi (Indonesia) Keshya Nurvita Hanadia	21–18, 12–21, 21–10	(gold) Winner
2011	Indonesia International	(Indonesia) Suci Rizky Andini	(Indonesia) Keshya Nurvita Hanadia (Indonesia) Devi Tika Permatasari	21–16, 21–16	(gold) Winner
2011	India International	(Indonesia) Suci Rizky Andini	(Indonesia) Gebby Ristiyani Imawan (Indonesia) Tiara Rosalia Nuraidah	23–21, 21–13	(gold) Winner
2014	Bulgarian International	(Indonesia) Gebby Ristiyani Imawan	(Indonesia) Ririn Amelia (Indonesia) Komala Dewi	21–9, 18–21, 21–18	(gold) Winner
2015	Malaysia International	(Indonesia) Rosyita Eka Putri Sari	(Thailand) Chayanit Chaladchalam (Thailand) Phataimas Muenwong	21–18, 21–11	(gold) Winner

BWF International Challenge tournament
BWF Future Series tournament

=== BWF Junior International (1 title) ===
Girls' doubles
Year	Tournament	Partner	Opponent	Score	Result	Ref.
2009	Indonesia Junior International	(Indonesia) Gebby Ristiyani Imawan	(Indonesia) Dian Fitriani (Indonesia) Ery Octaviani	21–14, 26–24	(gold) Winner	

BWF Junior International Grand Prix tournament
BWF Junior International Challenge tournament
BWF Junior International Series tournament
BWF Junior Future Series tournament

== Performance timeline ==
Key

W	Won	F	Finalist	SF	Semi-finalist
QF	Quarter-finalist	#R	Rounds 4, 3, 2, 1	RR	Round-robin stage
Q#	Qualification round	A	Absent	w/d	Withdrew
G	Gold	S	Silver	B	Bronze
NH	Not held	N/A	Not applicable	DNQ	Did not qualify

=== National team ===
- Junior level

Team event	2010
Asian Junior Championships	B

- Senior level

Team events	2015	2016	2017	2018	2019
Asia Team Championships	NH	A	NH	B	NH
Asia Mixed Team Championships	NH		A	NH	B
Asian Games	NH			B	NH
Uber Cup	NH	QF	NH	QF	NH
Sudirman Cup	B	NH	RR	NH	A

=== Individual competitions ===
- Junior level

Event	2009	2010
Asian Junior Championships	A	B (XD)
World Junior Championships	S (XD)	A

- Senior level

Events	2011	2013	2014	2015	2016	2017	2018	2019
Asian Championships	A	2R	A		2R	2R	B	B
Asian Games	NH		A	NH			R16	NH
World Championships	2R	A	QF	A	NH	A	QF	3R

Tournament	BWF World Tour			Best
Tournament	2018	2019	2020	Best
Malaysia Masters	A	2R	A	2R (2012, 2016, 2019)
Indonesia Masters	QF (WD)	1R	A	SF (2016)
Thailand Masters	QF (WD)	2R	1R	QF (2017, 2018)
Spain Masters	A	1R	A	1R (2019)
German Open	2R (WD)	1R	NH	F (2015)
All England Open	2R (WD)	1R	A	2R (2014, 2016, 2018)
India Open	QF (WD)	SF	NH	SF (2010, 2019)
Malaysia Open	SF (WD)	1R	NH	SF (2018)
Singapore Open	1R (WD)	1R	NH	QF (2016)
New Zealand Open	QF (WD)	2R	NH	QF (2018)
Australian Open	A	1R	NH	2R (2012)
Indonesia Open	1R (WD)	2R	NH	QF (2010, 2013, 2017)
Japan Open	1R (WD)	1R	NH	1R (2018, 2019)
Thailand Open	A	1R	A	QF (2012)
Chinese Taipei Open	A	2R	NH	F (2012)
Vietnam Open	A	W	NH	W (2016, 2019)
China Open	2R (WD)	A	NH	2R (2016, 2018)
Korea Open	2R (WD)	A	NH	2R (2017, 2018)
Indonesia Masters Super 100	A	F	NH	F (2019)
Macau Open	A	SF	NH	SF (2017, 2019)
Fuzhou China Open	A	1R	NH	SF (2016)
Hong Kong Open	QF (WD); 1R (XD)	1R	NH	QF (2013, 2018)
Syed Modi International	SF (WD)	A	NH	SF (2010, 2018)
Year-end ranking	12 (WD); 415 (XD)	19	19	9
Tournament	2018	2019	2020	Best

Tournament	BWF Superseries								Best
Tournament	2010	2011	2012	2013	2014	2015	2016	2017	Best
All England Open	A			1R	2R (WD)	A	2R (WD)	1R	2R (2014, 2016)
India Open	N/A	A		2R	2R (WD)	A			SF (2010)
Malaysia Open	A			2R	2R (WD)	A		2R	2R (2013, 2014, 2017)
Singapore Open	A				1R (WD)	A	QF (WD)	1R	QF (2016)
Indonesia Open	QF	A	1R	QF	1R (WD)	A	1R (WD)	QF	QF (2010, 2013, 2017)
Australian Open	N/A				A		1R (WD)	A	2R (2012)
Korea Open	A			1R	1R (WD)	2R	A		2R (2015)
Denmark Open	A		2R	A			1R (WD)	QF	QF (2017)
French Open	A		2R	A			QF (WD)	A	QF (2016)
China Open	A		1R	A			2R (WD)	A	2R (2016)
Hong Kong Open	A		2R	QF	A		2R (WD)	A	QF (2013)
Year-end ranking	33	29	23	69	27 (WD); 192 (XD)	57	15 (WD); 316 (XD)	36	
Tournament	2010	2011	2012	2013	2014	2015	2016	2017	Best

Tournament	BWF Grand Prix and Grand Prix Gold								Best
Tournament	2010	2011	2012	2013	2014	2015	2016	2017	Best
Malaysia Masters	1R	1R	2R	A			1R (WD); 2R (XD)	A	2R (2012, 2016)
Syed Modi International	SF	QF	A	NH	A		1R (WD)	A	SF (2010)
Thailand Masters	NH						A	QF	QF (2017)
German Open	A					F	A	QF	F (2015)
India Open	SF	N/A							SF (2010)
Swiss Open	N/A	A		1R	1R (WD)	A		QF	QF (2017)
China Masters	N/A				A		SF (WD)	A	SF (2016)
Australian Open	A		2R	A	N/A				2R (2012)
Chinese Taipei Open	A	QF	F	A	2R (WD)	1R	2R (WD)	A	F (2012)
Thailand Open	NH	2R	QF	A	NH	A			QF (2012)
Vietnam Open	1R	w/d	2R	w/d	A	SF	W (WD)	F	W (2016)
London Grand Prix Gold	NH			2R	NH				2R (2013)
Dutch Open	A			F	SF (WD); 1R (XD)	A		W	W (2017)
Bitburger Open	QF	A							QF (2010)
Korea Masters		2R	A		1R (WD)	QF	A	2R	QF (2015)
Macau Open	A				2R (WD)	QF	2R (WD)	SF	SF (2017)
Indonesia Masters	QF	1R	QF	QF	1R (WD); 2R (XD)	2R	SF (WD)	NH	SF (2016)
