= Rizki Amelia Pradipta =

Indonesian badminton player (born 1990)

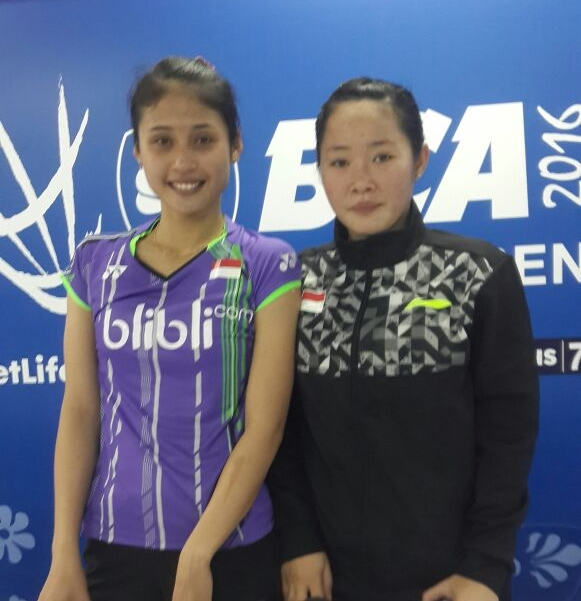
- Pradipta (left) with Tiara Rosalia Nuraidah at the 2016 Indonesia Open

Personal information
- Born: September 1, 1990 (age 36) Surakarta, Central Java, Indonesia
- Height: 1.71 m (5 ft 7 in)
- Weight: 61 kg (134 lb)

Sport
- Country: Indonesia
- Sport: Badminton
- Handedness: Right

Women's doubles
- Highest ranking: 6 (with P Z Bernadet 27 March 2014)
- Current ranking: 31 (with D D Haris 5 July 2022)
- BWF profile
Medal record
Women's badminton
Representing Indonesia
Asian Games
Bronze medal – third place	2018 Jakarta–Palembang	Women's team
Asian Championships
Bronze medal – third place	2018 Wuhan	Women's doubles
Bronze medal – third place	2019 Wuhan	Women's doubles
Asia Mixed Team Championships
Bronze medal – third place	2019 Hong Kong	Mixed team
Asia Team Championships
Bronze medal – third place	2018 Alor Setar	Women's team

Rizki Amelia Pradipta (born 1 September 1990) is an Indonesian badminton player specializing in doubles affiliated with Jaya Raya Jakarta club. She was two-time Asian Championships bronze medalists winning in 2018 and 2019. Pradipta was also part of the national women's team that won the bronze medal at the 2018 Asian Games.

== Career summary ==
=== Women's singles ===
Pradipta career started when she was selected as a member of Indonesia national badminton team that competed in 2008 BWF World Junior Championships in Pune, India as a singles player. Coming as an unseeded player, she performed quite well and beat Chan Tsz Ka from Hong Kong who was seeded 9/16 in the third round 21–23, 21–15, 21–12. In that tournament, Pradipta reached the fourth round only to be beaten by Porntip Buranaprasertsuk from Thailand 13–21, 21–16, 4–21.

In 2009, after such a good performance in Pune, Pradipta was chosen by PBSI to be promoted to join the national team in Cipayung as a singles player, but in early 2010, due to lack of results that she had achieved, she was finally relegated by PBSI and had to return to her club.

=== Change discipline and breakthrough ===
After facing the agony of being relegated from the national team, Pradipta went back to her club Jaya Raya and tried to continue her career as an independent player. She then changed to play in doubles disciplines, and in 2011, started her partnership with Pia Zebadiah Bernadet who was just recently resigned from national team. As a new pair, they won their first tournament in 2012 Vietnam International beating Malaysian pair Amelia Alicia Anscelly and Soong Fie Cho 21–10, 21–15.

They won their second title after beating Korean pair Lee Se-rang and Yoo Hyun-young 21–17, 19v21, 21–13 in the final of 2012 Indonesia International, and finally they won their first Grand Prix title in 2012 Vietnam Open beating Ng Hui Ern and Ng Hui Lin from Malaysia 21–17, 21–19 in the final. In October 2012, they beat Suci Rizki Andini and Della Destiara Haris 21–15, 21–12 as both pairs brilliantly making all Indonesian final in Chinese Taipei Open. And for Pradipta and Zebadiah, it was their fourth title overall and second Grand Prix title.

In the beginning of 2013, after their good results in 2012, PBSI recognized their achievement, and called them back to the national team, this time as a double specialist. But then, respectively, both players rejected the offer and continuing their career as an independent player.

In early May, they won their first title of the year after winning 2013 Malaysia Grand Prix Gold beating the evergreen Vita Marissa and her new starlet partner Aprilsasi Putri Lejarsar Variella 21–17, 16–21, 21–17 in the final. Following their good results, their world ranking was also growing rapidly and just after one and a half years, the pair finally reached top 10 in the world ranking on 30 May 2013.

== Awards and nominations ==
Award	Year	Category	Result	Ref.
Indonesian Sport Awards	2018	Favorite Women's Team Athlete with 2018 Asian Games women's badminton team	Won	

== Achievements ==
=== Asian Championships ===
Women's doubles
Year	Venue	Partner	Opponent	Score	Result
2018	Wuhan Sports Center Gymnasium; Wuhan, China	(Indonesia) Della Destiara Haris	(Japan) Yuki Fukushima (Japan) Sayaka Hirota	29–27, 17–21, 11–21	Bronze
2019	Wuhan Sports Center Gymnasium; Wuhan, China	(Indonesia) Della Destiara Haris	(China) Chen Qingchen (China) Jia Yifan	20–22, 12–21	Bronze

=== BWF World Tour (1 title, 2 runners-up) ===
The BWF World Tour, which was announced on 19 March 2017 and implemented in 2018, is a series of elite badminton tournaments sanctioned by the Badminton World Federation (BWF). The BWF World Tour is divided into levels of World Tour Finals, Super 1000, Super 750, Super 500, Super 300 (part of the HSBC World Tour), and the BWF Tour Super 100.

Women's doubles
Year	Tournament	Level	Partner	Opponent	Score	Result
2018	SaarLorLux Open	Super 100	(Indonesia) Ni Ketut Mahadewi Istarani	(Bulgaria) Gabriela Stoeva (Bulgaria) Stefani Stoeva	20–22, 21–15, 19–21	(silver) Runner-up
2019	Vietnam Open	Super 100	(Indonesia) Della Destiara Haris	(China) Huang Jia (China) Zhang Shuxian	21–18, 21–17	(gold) Winner
2019	Indonesia Masters	Super 100	(Indonesia) Della Destiara Haris	(Indonesia) Siti Fadia Silva Ramadhanti (Indonesia) Ribka Sugiarto	21–23, 15–21	(silver) Runner-up

=== BWF Grand Prix (4 titles, 2 runners-up) ===
The BWF Grand Prix had two levels, the Grand Prix and Grand Prix Gold. It was a series of badminton tournaments sanctioned by the Badminton World Federation (BWF) and played between 2007 and 2017.

Women's doubles
Year	Tournament	Partner	Opponent	Score	Result
2012	Vietnam Open	(Indonesia) Pia Zebadiah Bernadet	(Malaysia) Ng Hui Ern (Malaysia) Ng Hui Lin	21–17, 21–19	(gold) Winner
2012	Chinese Taipei Open	(Indonesia) Pia Zebadiah Bernadet	(Indonesia) Suci Rizky Andini (Indonesia) Della Destiara Haris	21–15, 21–12	(gold) Winner
2013	Malaysia Grand Prix Gold	(Indonesia) Pia Zebadiah Bernadet	(Indonesia) Vita Marissa (Indonesia) Aprilsasi Putri Lejarsar Variella	21–17, 16–21, 21–17	(gold) Winner
2016	Vietnam Open	(Indonesia) Tiara Rosalia Nuraidah	(Indonesia) Della Destiara Haris (Indonesia) Rosyita Eka Putri Sari	11–21, 15–21	(silver) Runner-up
2017	Vietnam Open	(Indonesia) Della Destiara Haris	(Thailand) Chayanit Chaladchalam (Thailand) Phataimas Muenwong	16–21, 19–21	(silver) Runner-up
2017	Dutch Open	(Indonesia) Della Destiara Haris	(Indonesia) Anggia Shitta Awanda (Indonesia) Ni Ketut Mahadewi Istarani	21–17, 21–16	(gold) Winner

BWF Grand Prix Gold tournament
BWF Grand Prix tournament

=== BWF International Challenge/Series (2 titles) ===
Women's doubles
Year	Tournament	Partner	Opponent	Score	Result
2012	Vietnam International	(Indonesia) Pia Zebadiah Bernadet	(Malaysia) Amelia Alicia Anscelly (Malaysia) Soong Fie Cho	21–10, 21–15	(gold) Winner
2012	Indonesia International	(Indonesia) Pia Zebadiah Bernadet	(South Korea) Lee Se-rang (South Korea) Yoo Hyun-young	21–17, 19–21, 21–13	(gold) Winner

BWF International Challenge tournament
BWF International Series tournament

== Performance timeline ==
=== National team ===
- Senior level

Team Events	2017	2018	2019
Asia Team Championships	—N/a	Bronze	—N/a
Asia Mixed Team Championships	QF	—N/a	Bronze
Asian Games	—N/a	Bronze	—N/a

=== Individual competitions ===
- Senior level

Events	2013	2014	2015	2016	2017	2018	2019
Asian Championships	w/d	A			R1	Bronze	Bronze
Asian Games	—N/a	A	—N/a			R16	—N/a
World Championships	QF (WD)	R3 (WD); R1 (XD)	R2 (WD)	—N/a	A	QF	R3

Tournament	2018	2019	Best
BWF World Tour
Thailand Masters	QF	R1	QF (2017, 2018)
Malaysia Masters	A	QF	W (2013)
Indonesia Masters	QF	R1	SF (2012, 2016)
German Open	R2	R2	R2 (2017, 2018, 2019)
All England Open	R2	QF	QF (2013, 2014, 2019)
India Open	QF	R1	QF (2018)
Malaysia Open	SF	QF	SF (2018)
Singapore Open	R1	R1	SF (2013)
New Zealand Open	QF	R2	QF (2015, 2018)
Australian Open	A	R1	R2 (2014)
Indonesia Open	R1	R2	QF (2013, 2016)
Japan Open	R1	R1	SF (2013)
Thailand Open	A	R1	R1 (2012, 2013, 2019)
Chinese Taipei Open	A	R2	W (2012)
Vietnam Open	A	W	W (2012, 2019)
China Open	R2	A	R2 (2013, 2018)
Korea Open	R2	A	R2 (2015, 2018)
Indonesia Masters Super 100	A	F	F (2019)
Denmark Open	QF	A	QF (2017, 2018)
French Open	R2	A	QF (2012)
Macau Open	A	SF	SF (2012, 2019)
SaarLorLux Open	F	A	F (2018)
Fuzhou China Open	A	R1	QF (2013, 2016, 2017)
Hong Kong Open	QF	R1	QF (2018)
Syed Modi International	SF	A	SF (2018)
Year-end ranking	12	19	6
Tournament	2018	2019	Best

Tournament	2009	2010	2011	2012	2013	2014	2015	2016	2017	Best
BWF Superseries
All England Open	A				QF (WD)	QF (WD)	R1 (WD)	A	R2	QF (2013, 2014)
India Open	GPG		A			R1 (WD); R1 (XD)	A			R1 (2014)
Malaysia Open	A				R2 (WD)	QF (WD); R1 (XD)	R2 (WD)	A		QF (2014)
Singapore Open	A			R2 (WD)	SF (WD)	R1 (WD); R2 (XD)	QF (WD)	R2	A	SF (2013)
Australian Open	GPG					R2 (WD); R1 (XD)	R1 (WD)	A		R2 (2014)
Indonesia Open	R1 (WS)	A		R2 (WD)	QF (WD)	R1 (WD); R1 (XD)	R1 (WD)	QF	R1	QF (2013, 2016)
Korea Open	A				R1 (WD)	A	R2 (WD)	A		R2 (2015)
Japan Open	A				SF (WD); R2 (XD)	A				SF (2013)
China Masters	A				QF (WD); R1 (XD)	GPG				QF (2013, 2016, 2017)
Denmark Open	A			R1 (WD)	R2 (WD); R1 (XD)	R2 (WD)	A	A	QF	QF (2017)
French Open	A			QF (WD)	R2 (WD)	R1 (WD); R1 (XD)	A	R1	A	QF (2012)
China Open	A				R2 (WD); R2 (XD)	A				R2 (2013)
Hong Kong Open	A			R1 (WD)	R2 (WD); R1 (XD)	R2 (WD)	A	R1	A	R2 (2013, 2014)
BWF Super Series Finals	DNQ				GS (WD)	DNQ				GS (2013)
Year-end ranking	219 (WS)	a187 (WS)		15 (WD); 196 (XD)	6 (WD); 53 (XD)	14 (WD); 59 (XD)	38 (WD); 116 (XD)	18	60	6
Tournament	2009	2010	2011	2012	2013	2014	2015	2016	2017	Best

Tournament	2009	2010	2011	2012	2013	2014	2015	2016	2017	Best
BWF Grand Prix and Grand Prix Gold
Malaysia Masters	A			R2 (WD)	W (WD); R1 (XD)	A	SF (WD); R1 (XD)	A		W (2013)
Syed Modi International	A	R2 (WS); R1 (XD)	A		—N/a	QF (WD)	A			QF (2014)
Philippines Open	R1 (WS)	—N/a								R1 (2009)
Thailand Masters	—N/a							R2	QF	QF (2017)
German Open	A						w/d	A	R2	R2 (2017)
Swiss Open	SS		A		QF (WD); R1 (XD)	QF (WD); R1 (XD)	R1 (WD); R2 (XD)	A	R2	QF (2013, 2014)
Australian Open	A				R1 (WD)	SS				R1 (2013)
New Zealand Open	A	—N/a	A	—N/a	A		QF (WD); R1 (XD)	R2	A	QF (2015)
China Masters	SS					A		QF	QF	QF (2013, 2016, 2017)
Chinese Taipei Open	A			W (WD); R1 (XD)	A		R1 (WD)	QF	A	W (2012)
Thailand Open	A	—N/a	A	R1 (WD); R1 (XD)	R1 (WD); R1 (XD)	—N/a	A			R1 (2012, 2013)
Vietnam Open	R2 (WS)	A		W (WD); R2 (XD)	A		SF (WD)	F	F	W (2012)
Dutch Open	A			QF (WD); R1 (XD)	A				W	W (2017)
Bitburger Open	A							SF	A	SF (2016)
Korea Masters	A								R2	R2 (2017)
Macau Open	A			SF (WD)	A		R1 (WD)	R1	A	SF (2012)
Indonesian Masters	—N/a	R1 (WS)	A	SF (WD); R1 (XD)	R1 (WD); QF (XD)	A	R1 (WD)	SF	—N/a	SF (2012, 2016)
Year-end ranking	219 (WS)	187 (WS)		15 (WD); 196 (XD)	6 (WD); 53 (XD)	14 (WD); 59 (XD)	38 (WD); 116 (XD)	18	60	6
Tournament	2009	2010	2011	2012	2013	2014	2015	2016	2017	Best
