= 2019 Malaysia Open =

Badminton tournament in Kuala Lumpur

Tournament details
- Dates: 2–7 April
- Level: Super 750
- Total prize money: US$700,000
- Venue: Axiata Arena
- Location: Kuala Lumpur, Malaysia

Champions
- Men's singles: (China) Lin Dan
- Women's singles: (Chinese Taipei) Tai Tzu-ying
- Men's doubles: (China) Li Junhui (China) Liu Yuchen
- Women's doubles: (China) Chen Qingchen (China) Jia Yifan
- Mixed doubles: (China) Zheng Siwei (China) Huang Yaqiong

The 2019 Malaysia Open (officially known as the Celcom Axiata Malaysia Open 2019 for sponsorship reasons) was a badminton tournament which took place at Axiata Arena in Malaysia from 2 to 7 April 2019 and had a total purse of $700,000.

== Tournament ==
The 2019 Malaysia Open was the ninth tournament of the 2019 BWF World Tour and also part of the Malaysia Open championships, which had been held since 1937. This tournament was organized by the Badminton Association of Malaysia with sanction from the BWF.

=== Venue ===
This international tournament was held at Axiata Arena in Kuala Lumpur, Malaysia.

=== Point distribution ===
Below is the point distribution table for each phase of the tournament based on the BWF points system for the BWF World Tour Super 750 event.

Winner	Runner-up	3/4	5/8	9/16	17/32
11,000	9,350	7,700	6,050	4,320	2,660

=== Prize money ===
The total prize money for this tournament was US$700,000. Distribution of prize money was in accordance with BWF regulations.

Event	Winner	Finals	Semi-finals	Quarter-finals	Last 16	Last 32
Singles	$49,000	$23,800	$9,800	$3,850	$2,100	$700
Doubles	$51,800	$24,500	$9,800	$4,375	$2,275	$700

== Men's singles ==
=== Seeds ===
1. (Japan) Kento Momota (second round)
2. (China) Shi Yuqi (semi-finals)
3. (Chinese Taipei) Chou Tien-chen (first round)
4. (China) Chen Long (final)
5. (South Korea) Son Wan-ho (withdrew)
6. (Denmark) Viktor Axelsen (quarter-finals)
7. (Indonesia) Anthony Sinisuka Ginting (first round)
8. (India) Srikanth Kidambi (quarter-finals)

=== Finals ===
Semi-finals
(Indonesia) Jonatan Christie	21	10	15
4	(China) Chen Long	12	21	21
(China) Lin Dan	21	16	21
2	(China) Shi Yuqi	19	21	12

Final
4	(China) Chen Long	21	17	11
(China) Lin Dan	9	21	21

=== Top half ===
==== Section 1 ====
First Round
1	(Japan) K Momota	20	21	21
(Denmark) J Ø. Jørgensen	22	13	11
(France) B Leverdez	12	12
(Indonesia) J Christie	21	21
6	(Denmark) V Axelsen	21	22
(Chinese Taipei) Wang T-w	14	20
(Indonesia) T Sugiarto	18	21	16
(China) Lu GZ	21	13	21

Second Round
1	(Japan) K Momota	20	15
(Indonesia) J Christie	22	21
6	(Denmark) V Axelsen	21	16	21
(China) Lu GZ	11	21	17

Quarter-finals
(Indonesia) J Christie	21	21
6	(Denmark) V Axelsen	18	19

==== Section 2 ====
First Round
4	(China) Chen L	21	21
(Denmark) H-K Vittinghus	13	9
(Malaysia) Liew D	10	15
(Thailand) K Wangcharoen	21	21
8	(India) S Kidambi	21	21
PFR	(Indonesia) I M Mustofa	18	16
(Thailand) K Phetpradab	21	21
(South Korea) Lee D-k	15	13

Second Round
4	(China) Chen L	22	21
(Thailand) K Wangcharoen	20	13
8	(India) S Kidambi	21	21
(Thailand) K Phetpradab	11	15

Quarter-finals
4	(China) Chen L	21	21
8	(India) S Kidambi	18	19

=== Bottom half ===
==== Section 3 ====
First Round
PFR	(Thailand) S Thammasin	12	21	21
(India) Prannoy K	21	16	14
(Japan) K Tsuneyama	21	21
PFR	(Malaysia) Chong W F	12	12
(Thailand) S Avihingsanon	21	19	21
(Malaysia) Lee Z J	17	21	15
(China) Lin D	13	21	21
3	(Chinese Taipei) Chou T-c	21	19	19

Second Round
PFR	(Thailand) S Thammasin	19	22	11
(Japan) K Tsuneyama	21	20	21
(Thailand) S Avihingsanon	23	8
(China) Lin D	25	21

Quarter-finals
(Japan) K Tsuneyama	21	17	10
(China) Lin D	16	21	21

==== Section 4 ====
First Round
(Denmark) R Gemke	21	24
(South Korea) Lee H-i	19	22
(Japan) K Nishimoto	18	21	23
7	(Indonesia) A S Ginting	21	13	21
(China) Huang YX	17	21	13
(Denmark) A Antonsen	21	16	21
(India) S Verma	20	23	12
2	(China) Shi YQ	22	21	21

Second Round
(Denmark) R Gemke	21	15	9
(Japan) K Nishimoto	18	21	21
(Denmark) A Antonsen	18	19
2	(China) Shi YQ	21	21

Quarter-finals
(Japan) K Nishimoto	17	16
2	(China) Shi YQ	21	21

== Women's singles ==
=== Seeds ===
1. (Chinese Taipei) Tai Tzu-ying (champion)
2. (Japan) Nozomi Okuhara (semi-finals)
3. (China) Chen Yufei (semi-finals)
4. (Japan) Akane Yamaguchi (final)
5. (India) P. V. Sindhu (second round)
6. (China) He Bingjiao (quarter-finals)
7. (Thailand) Ratchanok Intanon (quarter-finals)
8. (India) Saina Nehwal (first round)

=== Finals ===
Semi-finals
1	(Chinese Taipei) Tai Tzu-ying	21	21
3	(China) Chen Yufei	14	19
4	(Japan) Akane Yamaguchi	21	22
2	(Japan) Nozomi Okuhara	15	20

Final
1	(Chinese Taipei) Tai Tzu-ying	21	21
4	(Japan) Akane Yamaguchi	16	19

=== Top half ===
==== Section 1 ====
First Round
1	(Chinese Taipei) Tai T-y	21	21
(Hong Kong) Deng X	14	13
(England) C Birch	10	7
(Thailand) B Ongbamrungphan	21	21
7	(Thailand) R Intanon	21	21
(Indonesia) G M Tunjung	12	16
(United States) BW Zhang	21	21
(Hong Kong) Cheung N Y	17	11

Second Round
1	(Chinese Taipei) Tai T-y	21	21
(Thailand) B Ongbamrungphan	16	14
7	(Thailand) R Intanon	23	21	21
(United States) BW Zhang	25	14	16

Quarter-finals
1	(Chinese Taipei) Tai T-y	21	21
7	(Thailand) R Intanon	19	13

==== Section 2 ====
First Round
3	(China) Chen YF	19	21	21
(China) Han Y	21	10	13
(China) Chen XX	13	21	21
(South Korea) Kim G-e	21	13	14
5	(India) P. V. Sindhu	22	21
(Japan) A Ohori	20	12
(South Korea) Sung J-h	21	21
(Indonesia) Fitriani	15	15

Second Round
3	(China) Chen YF	21	21
(China) Chen XX	12	14
5	(India) P. V. Sindhu	18	7
(South Korea) Sung J-h	21	21

Quarter-finals
3	(China) Chen YF	21	21
(South Korea) Sung J-h	18	14

=== Bottom half ===
==== Section 3 ====
First Round
(Thailand) N Jindapol	13	12
(Malaysia) Goh J W	21	21
(Thailand) P Chochuwong	20	21	21
8	(India) S Nehwal	22	15	10
(Hong Kong) Yip P Y	21	16	12
(Japan) S Takahashi	13	21	21
(Malaysia) S Cheah S Y	16	17
4	(Japan) A Yamaguchi	21	21

Second Round
(Malaysia) Goh J W	16	21	10
(Thailand) P Chochuwong	21	12	21
(Japan) S Takahashi	16	21	16
4	(Japan) A Yamaguchi	21	15	21

Quarter-finals
(Thailand) P Chochuwong	10	21	19
4	(Japan) A Yamaguchi	21	7	21

==== Section 4 ====
First Round
(Russia) E Kosetskaya	20	16
(Scotland) K Gilmour	22	21
(Denmark) L Kjærsfeldt	21	12	12
6	(China) He BJ	10	21	21
(China) Li XR	21	21
(China) Cai YY	6	18
(Denmark) M Blichfeldt	15	16
2	(Japan) N Okuhara	21	21

Second Round
(Scotland) K Gilmour	15	20
6	(China) He BJ	21	22
(China) Li XR	18	18
2	(Japan) N Okuhara	21	21

Quarter-finals
6	(China) He BJ	19	21
2	(Japan) N Okuhara	21	23

== Men's doubles ==
=== Seeds ===
1. (Indonesia) Marcus Fernaldi Gideon / Kevin Sanjaya Sukamuljo (quarter-finals)
2. (China) Li Junhui / Liu Yuchen (champions)
3. (Japan) Takeshi Kamura / Keigo Sonoda (final)
4. (Japan) Hiroyuki Endo / Yuta Watanabe (first round)
5. (Denmark) Kim Astrup / Anders Skaarup Rasmussen (first round)
6. (Indonesia) Mohammad Ahsan / Hendra Setiawan (quarter-finals)
7. (China) Han Chengkai / Zhou Haodong (quarter-finals)
8. (Indonesia) Fajar Alfian / Muhammad Rian Ardianto (semi-finals)

=== Finals ===
Semi-finals
8	(Indonesia) Fajar Alfian (Indonesia) Muhammad Rian Ardianto	13	20
3	(Japan) Takeshi Kamura (Japan) Keigo Sonoda	21	22
(Japan) Takuro Hoki (Japan) Yugo Kobayashi	21	19	15
2	(China) Li Junhui (China) Liu Yuchen	13	21	21

Final
3	(Japan) Takeshi Kamura (Japan) Keigo Sonoda	12	17
2	(China) Li Junhui (China) Liu Yuchen	21	21

=== Top half ===
==== Section 1 ====
First Round
1	(Indonesia) M F Gideon (Indonesia) K S Sukamuljo	21	21
(Chinese Taipei) Lee Y (Chinese Taipei) Wang C-l	13	12
(Japan) T Inoue (Japan) Y Kaneko	21	21
(Russia) V Ivanov (Russia) I Sozonov	15	12
8	(Indonesia) F Alfian (Indonesia) M R Ardianto	21	21
(Indonesia) R K Suwardi (Indonesia) A Pratama	9	17
(Chinese Taipei) Liao M-c (Chinese Taipei) Su C-h	21	13	21
(China) Ou XY (China) Ren XY	13	21	18

Second Round
1	(Indonesia) M F Gideon (Indonesia) K S Sukamuljo	21	21
(Japan) T Inoue (Japan) Y Kaneko	8	19
8	(Indonesia) F Alfian (Indonesia) M R Ardianto	21	22	21
(Chinese Taipei) Liao M-c (Chinese Taipei) Su C-h	15	24	18

Quarter-finals
1	(Indonesia) M F Gideon (Indonesia) K S Sukamuljo	21	21	18
8	(Indonesia) F Alfian (Indonesia) M R Ardianto	23	19	21

==== Section 2 ====
First Round
3	(Japan) T Kamura (Japan) K Sonoda	21	21
(China) Huang KX (China) Wang ZK	17	18
(Malaysia) Goh V S (Malaysia) Tan W K	21	21
(Thailand) T Isriyanet (Thailand) K Namdash	14	18
7	(China) Han CK (China) Zhou HD	21	21
(India) M Attri (India) B. S Reddy	16	6
(Thailand) K Kedren (Thailand) D Puavaranukroh	17	19
(Malaysia) Ong Y S (Malaysia) Teo E Y	21	21

Second Round
3	(Japan) T Kamura (Japan) K Sonoda	10	21	21
(Malaysia) Goh V S (Malaysia) Tan W K	21	13	9
7	(China) Han CK (China) Zhou HD	21	21
(Malaysia) Ong Y S (Malaysia) Teo E Y	17	19

Quarter-finals
3	(Japan) T Kamura (Japan) K Sonoda	22	21
7	(China) Han CK (China) Zhou HD	20	18

=== Bottom half ===
==== Section 3 ====
First Round
(China) Liu C (China) Zhang N	21	15	21
(Malaysia) M Arif A L (Malaysia) N M Azriyn A	18	21	14
(Indonesia) W Nayaka (Indonesia) A Yusuf	21	24	21
5	(Denmark) K Astrup (Denmark) A S Rasmussen	19	26	8
(England) M Ellis (England) C Langridge	14	19
(Malaysia) A Chia (Malaysia) Soh W Y	21	21
(Japan) T Hoki (Japan) Y Kobayashi	17	24	21
4	(Japan) H Endo (Japan) Y Watanabe	21	22	9

Second Round
(China) Liu C (China) Zhang N	21	18	25
(Indonesia) W Nayaka (Indonesia) A Yusuf	17	21	23
(Malaysia) A Chia (Malaysia) Soh W Y	9	16
(Japan) T Hoki (Japan) Y Kobayashi	21	21

Quarter-finals
(China) Liu C (China) Zhang N	17	15
(Japan) T Hoki (Japan) Y Kobayashi	21	21

==== Section 4 ====
First Round
(China) He JT (China) Tan Q	18	22
PFR	(Malaysia) Chooi K M (Malaysia) Low J S	21	24
(Thailand) B Isara (Thailand) M Jongjit	16	19
6	(Indonesia) M Ahsan (Indonesia) H Setiawan	21	21
(United States) P Chew (United States) R Chew	13	12
(Chinese Taipei) Lu C-y (Chinese Taipei) Yang P-h	21	21
(Indonesia) B Angriawan (Indonesia) Hardianto	21	14	15
2	(China) Li JH (China) Liu YC	19	21	21

Second Round
PFR	(Malaysia) Chooi K M (Malaysia) Low J S	18	12
6	(Indonesia) M Ahsan (Indonesia) H Setiawan	21	21
(Chinese Taipei) Lu C-y (Chinese Taipei) Yang P-h	19	18
2	(China) Li JH (China) Liu YC	21	21

Quarter-finals
6	(Indonesia) M Ahsan (Indonesia) H Setiawan	13	21	17
2	(China) Li JH (China) Liu YC	21	16	21

== Women's doubles ==
=== Seeds ===
1. (Japan) Yuki Fukushima / Sayaka Hirota (quarter-finals)
2. (Japan) Misaki Matsutomo / Ayaka Takahashi (second round)
3. (Japan) Mayu Matsumoto / Wakana Nagahara (quarter-finals)
4. (Indonesia) Greysia Polii / Apriyani Rahayu (second round)
5. (China) Chen Qingchen / Jia Yifan (champions)
6. (Japan) Shiho Tanaka / Koharu Yonemoto (first round)
7. (Bulgaria) Gabriela Stoeva / Stefani Stoeva (withdrew)
8. (Thailand) Jongkolphan Kititharakul / Rawinda Prajongjai (semi-finals)

=== Finals ===
Semi-finals
(South Korea) Chang Ye-na (South Korea) Jung Kyung-eun	14	18
5	(China) Chen Qingchen (China) Jia Yifan	21	21
(China) Du Yue (China) Li Yinhui	21	21
8	(Thailand) Jongkolphan Kititharakul (Thailand) Rawinda Prajongjai	12	14

Final
5	(China) Chen Qingchen (China) Jia Yifan	21	21
(China) Du Yue (China) Li Yinhui	14	15

=== Top half ===
==== Section 1 ====
First Round
1	(Japan) Y Fukushima (Japan) S Hirota	21	21
(England) C Birch (England) L Smith	13	15
(Chinese Taipei) Hsu Y-c (Chinese Taipei) Hu L-f	11	20
(Russia) E Bolotova (Russia) A Davletova	21	22
7	(Bulgaria) G Stoeva (Bulgaria) S Stoeva
PFR	(Australia) S Mapasa (Australia) G Somerville	w	/	o
(China) Li WM (China) Zheng Y	21	21	20
(South Korea) Chang Y-n (South Korea) Jung K-e	16	23	22

Second Round
1	(Japan) Y Fukushima (Japan) S Hirota	21	21
(Russia) E Bolotova (Russia) A Davletova	13	13
PFR	(Australia) S Mapasa (Australia) G Somerville	14	15
(South Korea) Chang Y-n (South Korea) Jung K-e	21	21

Quarter-finals
1	(Japan) Y Fukushima (Japan) S Hirota	13	21	17
(South Korea) Chang Y-n (South Korea) Jung K-e	21	16	21

==== Section 2 ====
First Round
3	(Japan) M Matsumoto (Japan) W Nagahara	21	21
(Indonesia) A S Awanda (Indonesia) P Z Bernadet	19	11
(Malaysia) V Hoo K M (Malaysia) Yap C W	20	21	19
(Thailand) C Chaladchalam (Thailand) P Muenwong	22	16	21
5	(China) Chen QC (China) Jia YF	21	21
PFR	(China) Liu XX (China) Xia YT	16	18
(South Korea) Kim H-j (South Korea) Kong H-y	21	21
(Indonesia) D D Haris (Indonesia) T O Kusumah	16	16

Second Round
3	(Japan) M Matsumoto (Japan) W Nagahara	14	21	21
(Thailand) C Chaladchalam (Thailand) P Muenwong	21	8	15
5	(China) Chen QC (China) Jia YF	21	21
(South Korea) Kim H-j (South Korea) Kong H-y	9	11

Quarter-finals
3	(Japan) M Matsumoto (Japan) W Nagahara	17	13
5	(China) Chen QC (China) Jia YF	21	21

=== Bottom half ===
==== Section 3 ====
First Round
(Japan) A Sakuramoto (Japan) Y Takahata	21	11	21
(China) Du Y (China) Li YH	15	21	23
(Thailand) P Supajirakul (Thailand) S Taerattanachai	4
6	(Japan) S Tanaka (Japan) K Yonemoto	1^{r}
(Indonesia) Y Barkah (Indonesia) J F Sugiarto	15	20
(Indonesia) N K M Istarani (Indonesia) R A Pradipta	21	22
(United States) A Lee (United States) S Lee	9	10
4	(Indonesia) G Polii (Indonesia) A Rahayu	21	21

Second Round
(China) Du Y (China) Li YH	21	21
(Thailand) P Supajirakul (Thailand) S Taerattanachai	19	11
(Indonesia) N K M Istarani (Indonesia) R A Pradipta	21	20	21
4	(Indonesia) G Polii (Indonesia) A Rahayu	14	22	18

Quarter-finals
(China) Du Y (China) Li YH	21	21
(Indonesia) N K M Istarani (Indonesia) R A Pradipta	18	16

==== Section 4 ====
First Round
(China) Dong WJ (China) Feng XY	6
(Indonesia) A Imanuela (Indonesia) S F S Ramadhanti	0^{r}
(Malaysia) Chow M K (Malaysia) Lee M Y	21	10	15
8	(Thailand) J Kititharakul (Thailand) R Prajongjai	12	21	21
(South Korea) Baek H-n (South Korea) Kim H-r	22	17	22
(India) A Ponnappa (India) N. S Reddy	20	21	20
(China) Chen L (China) Xu Y	21	17	15
2	(Japan) M Matsutomo (Japan) A Takahashi	16	21	21

Second Round
(China) Dong WJ (China) Feng XY	14	22	13
8	(Thailand) J Kititharakul (Thailand) R Prajongjai	21	20	21
(South Korea) Baek H-n (South Korea) Kim H-r	21	22
2	(Japan) M Matsutomo (Japan) A Takahashi	18	20

Quarter-finals
8	(Thailand) J Kititharakul (Thailand) R Prajongjai	21	10	21
(South Korea) Baek H-n (South Korea) Kim H-r	18	21	18

== Mixed doubles ==
=== Seeds ===
1. (China) Zheng Siwei / Huang Yaqiong (champions)
2. (China) Wang Yilyu / Huang Dongping (final)
3. (Japan) Yuta Watanabe / Arisa Higashino (first round)
4. (Thailand) Dechapol Puavaranukroh / Sapsiree Taerattanachai (semi-finals)
5. (Malaysia) Chan Peng Soon / Goh Liu Ying (quarter-finals)
6. (England) Chris Adcock / Gabby Adcock (withdrew)
7. (Hong Kong) Tang Chun Man / Tse Ying Suet (first round)
8. (Indonesia) Hafiz Faizal / Gloria Emanuelle Widjaja (second round)

=== Finals ===
Semi-finals
1	(China) Zheng Siwei (China) Huang Yaqiong	21	21
4	(Thailand) Dechapol Puavaranukroh (Thailand) Sapsiree Taerattanachai	14	9
(Malaysia) Tan Kian Meng (Malaysia) Lai Pei Jing	13	17
2	(China) Wang Yilyu (China) Huang Dongping	21	21

Final
1	(China) Zheng Siwei (China) Huang Yaqiong	21	21
2	(China) Wang Yilyu (China) Huang Dongping	17	13

=== Top half ===
==== Section 1 ====
First Round
1	(China) Zheng SW (China) Huang YQ	21	21
(China) He JT (China) Du Y	16	16
(China) Lu K (China) Chen L	21	21
PFR	(Malaysia) M Arif A L (Indonesia) R A Riodingin	5	13
7	(Hong Kong) Tang C M (Hong Kong) Tse Y S	14	21	14
(Indonesia) R Alexander (Indonesia) A Saufika	21	19	21
(Japan) Y Kaneko (Japan) M Matsutomo	19	15
(Thailand) N Phuangphuapet (Thailand) S Amitrapai	21	21

Second Round
1	(China) Zheng SW (China) Huang YQ	21	21
(China) Lu K (China) Chen L	12	15
(Indonesia) R Alexander (Indonesia) A Saufika	13	14
(Thailand) N Phuangphuapet (Thailand) S Amitrapai	21	21

Quarter-finals
1	(China) Zheng SW (China) Huang YQ	21	21
(Thailand) N Phuangphuapet (Thailand) S Amitrapai	13	19

==== Section 2 ====
First Round
4	(Thailand) D Puavaranukroh (Thailand) S Taerattanachai	21	21
(Japan) T Hoki (Japan) W Nagahara	12	6
(Malaysia) Goh S H (Malaysia) S J Lai	21	21
(Indonesia) A E Prasetya (Indonesia) M G Islami	13	15
6	(England) C Adcock (England) G Adcock
(China) Ou XY (China) Feng XY	w	/	o
(Malaysia) Chen T J (Malaysia) Peck Y W	15	13
(England) M Ellis (England) L Smith	21	21

Second Round
4	(Thailand) D Puavaranukroh (Thailand) S Taerattanachai	w	/	o
(Malaysia) Goh S H (Malaysia) S J Lai
(China) Ou XY (China) Feng XY	14	22
(England) M Ellis (England) L Smith	21	24

Quarter-finals
4	(Thailand) D Puavaranukroh (Thailand) S Taerattanachai	21	21
(England) M Ellis (England) L Smith	14	12

=== Bottom half ===
==== Section 3 ====
First Round
(Vietnam) Đỗ T Đ (Vietnam) Phạm N T	15	18
(Indonesia) T Ahmad (Indonesia) W O Kandow	21	21
(Chinese Taipei) Lee Y (Chinese Taipei) Yang C-t	16	10
8	(Indonesia) H Faizal (Indonesia) G E Widjaja	21	21
(India) P Chopra (India) N. S Reddy	22	24
(Republic of Ireland) S Magee (Republic of Ireland) C Magee	20	22
(Malaysia) Tan K M (Malaysia) Lai P J	21	21
3	(Japan) Y Watanabe (Japan) A Higashino	16	15

Second Round
(Indonesia) T Ahmad (Indonesia) W O Kandow	19	21	21
8	(Indonesia) H Faizal (Indonesia) G E Widjaja	21	18	19
(India) P Chopra (India) N. S Reddy	21	17	13
(Malaysia) Tan K M (Malaysia) Lai P J	15	21	21

Quarter-finals
(Indonesia) T Ahmad (Indonesia) W O Kandow	21	16	16
(Malaysia) Tan K M (Malaysia) Lai P J	17	21	21

==== Section 4 ====
First Round
(Russia) R Alimov (Russia) A Davletova	18	21	25
(Indonesia) R Karanda Suwardi (Indonesia) P Z Bernadet	21	13	27
(Japan) K Gondo (Japan) A Kurihara	13	19
5	(Malaysia) Chan P S (Malaysia) Goh L Y	21	21
(Indonesia) P Jordan (Indonesia) M D Oktavianti	16	14
(Indonesia) R Rivaldy (Indonesia) P H Mentari	21	21
(Chinese Taipei) Wang C-l (Chinese Taipei) Cheng C-y	21	19	19
2	(China) Wang YL (China) Huang DP	17	21	21

Second Round
(Indonesia) R Karanda Suwardi (Indonesia) P Z Bernadet	13	14
5	(Malaysia) Chan P S (Malaysia) Goh L Y	21	21
(Indonesia) R Rivaldy (Indonesia) P H Mentari	12	6
2	(China) Wang YL (China) Huang DP	21	21

Quarter-finals
5	(Malaysia) Chan P S (Malaysia) Goh L Y	19	21	25
2	(China) Wang YL (China) Huang DP	21	16	27

Preceded by 2018 Malaysia Open	Malaysia Open	Succeeded by 2022 Malaysia Open
Preceded by 2019 India Open	BWF World Tour; 2019 BWF season	Succeeded by 2019 Singapore Open
