= 2018 Indonesia Masters =

2018 badminton tournament in Jakarta

Tournament details
- Dates: 23–28 January
- Edition: 8th
- Level: Super 500
- Total prize money: US$350,000
- Venue: Istora Gelora Bung Karno
- Location: Jakarta, Indonesia

Champions
- Men's singles: (Indonesia) Anthony Sinisuka Ginting
- Women's singles: (Chinese Taipei) Tai Tzu-ying
- Men's doubles: (Indonesia) Marcus Fernaldi Gideon (Indonesia) Kevin Sanjaya Sukamuljo
- Women's doubles: (Japan) Misaki Matsutomo (Japan) Ayaka Takahashi
- Mixed doubles: (China) Zheng Siwei (China) Huang Yaqiong

The 2018 Indonesia Masters, officially the Daihatsu Indonesia Masters 2018, was a badminton tournament which took place at Istora Gelora Bung Karno in Jakarta, Indonesia, from 23 to 28 January 2018 and had a total prize of US$350,000.

== Tournament ==
The 2018 Indonesia Masters was the third tournament of the 2018 BWF World Tour and also part of the Indonesia Masters championships which had been held since 2010. This tournament was organized by the Badminton Association of Indonesia with sanction from the BWF.

=== Venue ===
This international tournament was held at Istora Gelora Bung Karno in Jakarta, Indonesia. This was the first sporting event held there since its reopening after undergoing major renovation.

=== Point distribution ===
Below is a table with the point distribution for each phase of the tournament based on the BWF points system for the BWF World Tour Super 500 event.

Winner	Runner-up	3/4	5/8	9/16	17/32	33/64	65/128
9,200	7,800	6,420	5,040	3,600	2,220	880	430

=== Prize money ===
The total prize money for the 2018 tournament was US$350,000. Distribution of prize money was in accordance with BWF regulations.

Event	Winner	Finals	Semifinals	Quarterfinals	Last 16
Singles	$26,250	$13,300	$5,075	$2,100	$1,225
Doubles	$27,650	$13,300	$4,900	$2,537.50	$1,312.50

== Men's singles ==
=== Seeds ===
1. (Denmark) Viktor Axelsen (second round)
2. (India) Srikanth Kidambi (withdrew)
3. (China) Chen Long (quarterfinals)
4. (South Korea) Son Wan-ho (semifinals)
5. (China) Lin Dan (first round)
6. (Chinese Taipei) Chou Tien-chen (semifinals)
7. (Hong Kong) Ng Ka Long (first round)
8. (India) H. S. Prannoy (withdrew)

=== Finals ===
Semifinals
(Japan) Kazumasa Sakai	21	20	21
4	(South Korea) Son Wan-ho	18	22	15
(Indonesia) Anthony Sinisuka Ginting	21	13	21
6	(Chinese Taipei) Chou Tien-chen	16	21	12

Final
(Japan) Kazumasa Sakai	13	12
(Indonesia) Anthony Sinisuka Ginting	21	21

=== Top half ===
==== Section 1 ====
First Round
1	(Denmark) V Axelsen	21	21
(Chinese Taipei) Hsu J-h	13	7
(India) S Verma	16	21	10
(Japan) K Sakai	21	12	21
PFQ	(Indonesia) I M Mustofa	21	21	16
(Denmark) R Gemke	17	23	21
(England) R Ouseph	11	10
(South Korea) Jeon H-j	21	21

Second Round
1	(Denmark) V Axelsen	20	7^{r}
(Japan) K Sakai	22	11
(Denmark) R Gemke	23	21
(South Korea) Jeon H-j	21	15

Quarterfinals
(Japan) K Sakai	21	21
(Denmark) R Gemke	9	18

==== Section 2 ====
First Round
4	(South Korea) Son W-h	21	21
(Indonesia) J Christie	15	10
(Japan) K Tsuneyama	10	20
(Chinese Taipei) Wang T-w	21	22
7	(Hong Kong) Ng K L	19	19
Q1	(Indonesia) S D Kuncoro	21	21
Q4	(Indonesia) S H Rhustavito	16	19
(Indonesia) T Sugiarto	21	21

Second Round
4	(South Korea) Son W-h	21	11	21
(Chinese Taipei) Wang T-w	17	21	19
Q1	(Indonesia) S D Kuncoro	21	21
(Indonesia) T Sugiarto	14	10

Quarterfinals
4	(South Korea) Son W-h	21	21
Q1	(Indonesia) S D Kuncoro	14	14

=== Bottom half ===
==== Section 3 ====
First Round
(Hong Kong) Wong W K	17	8
(Indonesia) A S Ginting	21	21
Q3	(Thailand) K Wangcharoen	21	21
5	(China) Lin D	15	19
PFQ	(Thailand) S Avihingsanon	21	14	21
(Denmark) E Holst	19	21	12
(Denmark) A Antonsen	22	10
3	(China) Chen L	24	21

Second Round
(Indonesia) A S Ginting	21	21
Q3	(Thailand) K Wangcharoen	11	14
PFQ	(Thailand) S Avihingsanon	13	8
3	(China) Chen L	21	21

Quarterfinals
(Indonesia) A S Ginting	21	16	21
3	(China) Chen L	11	21	18

==== Section 4 ====
First Round
(France) B Leverdez	17	21	21
(China) Huang YX	21	19	9
Q2	(France) L Corvée	21	15	15
6	(Chinese Taipei) Chou T-c	12	21	21
(Thailand) K Phetpradab	21	18
(Denmark) H-K Vittinghus	23	21
PFQ	(Malaysia) Chong W F	21	21
PFQ	(India) K Parupalli	18	18

Second Round
(France) B Leverdez	16	17
6	(Chinese Taipei) Chou T-c	21	21
(Denmark) H-K Vittinghus	21	11	21
PFQ	(Malaysia) Chong W F	18	21	11

Quarterfinals
6	(Chinese Taipei) Chou T-c	15	21	21
(Denmark) H-K Vittinghus	21	16	18

== Women's singles ==
=== Seeds ===
1. (Chinese Taipei) Tai Tzu-ying (champion)
2. (India) P. V. Sindhu (quarterfinals)
3. (Spain) Carolina Marín (quarterfinals)
4. (Thailand) Ratchanok Intanon (semifinals)
5. (South Korea) Sung Ji-hyun (quarterfinals)
6. (Japan) Nozomi Okuhara (quarterfinals)
7. (China) Chen Yufei (first round)
8. (China) He Bingjiao (semifinals)

=== Finals ===
Semifinals
1	(Chinese Taipei) Tai Tzu-ying	19	21	21
8	(China) He Bingjiao	21	15	15
4	(Thailand) Ratchanok Intanon	19	19
(India) Saina Nehwal	21	21

Final
1	(Chinese Taipei) Tai Tzu-ying	21	21
(India) Saina Nehwal	9	13

=== Top half ===
==== Section 1 ====
First Round
1	(Chinese Taipei) Tai T-y	23	21	22
(Canada) M Li	25	12	20
(Chinese Taipei) Lee C-h	22	21
(Denmark) M Blichfeldt	20	11
5	(South Korea) Sung J-h	21	21
(Thailand) B Ongbumrungpan	17	17
(Thailand) N Jindapol	22	17	21
(Japan) S Sato	20	21	9

Second Round
1	(Chinese Taipei) Tai T-y	21	21
(Chinese Taipei) Lee C-h	14	13
5	(South Korea) Sung J-h	21	21
(Thailand) N Jindapol	16	11

Quarterfinals
1	(Chinese Taipei) Tai T-y	21	21
5	(South Korea) Sung J-h	11	8

==== Section 2 ====
First Round
3	(Spain) C Marín	21	21
(Indonesia) D D Ayustine	13	13
(Chinese Taipei) Chiang M-h	13	17
Q4	(Denmark) L Kjærsfeldt	21	21
8	(China) He BJ	21	21
(Japan) A Ohori	17	17
(Spain) B Corrales	12	10
(South Korea) Lee J-m	21	21

Second Round
3	(Spain) C Marín	21	21
Q4	(Denmark) L Kjærsfeldt	10	15
8	(China) He BJ	18	21	21
(South Korea) Lee J-m	21	15	18

Quarterfinals
3	(Spain) C Marín	19	21	16
8	(China) He BJ	21	12	21

=== Bottom half ===
==== Section 3 ====
First Round
Q2	(Chinese Taipei) Chen S-y	21	10	9
(Chinese Taipei) Pai Y-p	16	21	21
(Hong Kong) Cheung N Y	11	12
6	(Japan) N Okuhara	21	21
(Scotland) K Gilmour	22	15	16
(Indonesia) Fitriani	20	21	21
(United States) BW Zhang	7	13
4	(Thailand) R Intanon	21	21

Second Round
(Chinese Taipei) Pai Y-p	19	18
6	(Japan) N Okuhara	21	21
(Indonesia) Fitriani	17	16
4	(Thailand) R Intanon	21	21

Quarterfinals
6	(Japan) N Okuhara	17	10
4	(Thailand) R Intanon	21	21

==== Section 4 ====
First Round
PFQ	(Denmark) N K Rohde	10	3
(China) Chen XX	21	21
(India) S Nehwal	22	21	21
7	(China) Chen YF	24	15	14
Q3	(Indonesia) G M Tunjung	14	21	12
Q1	(Malaysia) Goh J W	21	19	21
(Indonesia) H Ramadini	13	10
2	(India) P. V. Sindhu	21	21

Second Round
(China) Chen XX	12	18
(India) S Nehwal	21	21
Q1	(Malaysia) Goh J W	12	9
2	(India) P. V. Sindhu	21	21

Quarterfinals
(India) S Nehwal	21	21
2	(India) P. V. Sindhu	13	19

== Men's doubles ==
=== Seeds ===
1. (Indonesia) Marcus Fernaldi Gideon / Kevin Sanjaya Sukamuljo (champions)
2. (China) Li Junhui / Liu Yuchen (final)
3. (China) Liu Cheng / Zhang Nan (semifinals)
4. (Denmark) Mads Conrad-Petersen / Mads Pieler Kolding (quarterfinals)
5. (Chinese Taipei) Lee Jhe-huei / Lee Yang (second round)
6. (Russia) Vladimir Ivanov / Ivan Sozonov (second round)
7. (Chinese Taipei) Chen Hung-ling / Wang Chi-lin (quarterfinals)
8. (Japan) Takuto Inoue / Yuki Kaneko (first round)

=== Finals ===
Semifinals
1	(Indonesia) Marcus Fernaldi Gideon (Indonesia) Kevin Sanjaya Sukamuljo	21	21
(India) Satwiksairaj Rankireddy (India) Chirag Shetty	14	11
3	(China) Liu Cheng (China) Zhang Nan	24	21	12
2	(China) Li Junhui (China) Liu Yuchen	26	14	21

Final
1	(Indonesia) Marcus Fernaldi Gideon (Indonesia) Kevin Sanjaya Sukamuljo	11	21	21
2	(China) Li Junhui (China) Liu Yuchen	21	10	16

=== Top half ===
==== Section 1 ====
First Round
1	(Indonesia) M F Gideon (Indonesia) K S Sukamuljo	21	21
PFQ	(Thailand) T Isriyanet (Thailand) K Namdash	16	16
(Indonesia) R A Saputro (Indonesia) H Setiawan	19	21	21
(Malaysia) Goh S F (Malaysia) N Izzuddin	21	12	12
7	(Chinese Taipei) Chen H-l (Chinese Taipei) Wang C-l	21	21
Q1	(Indonesia) S K Gutama (Indonesia) F W Putra	18	17
(France) B Kersaudy (France) J Maio	16	11
(Indonesia) B Angriawan (Indonesia) Hardianto	21	21

Second Round
1	(Indonesia) M F Gideon (Indonesia) K S Sukamuljo	21	23
(Indonesia) R A Saputro (Indonesia) H Setiawan	16	21
7	(Chinese Taipei) Chen H-l (Chinese Taipei) Wang C-l	21	21
(Indonesia) B Angriawan (Indonesia) Hardianto	11	18

Quarterfinals
1	(Indonesia) M F Gideon (Indonesia) K S Sukamuljo	20	21	21
7	(Chinese Taipei) Chen H-l (Chinese Taipei) Wang C-l	22	14	14

==== Section 2 ====
First Round
4	(Denmark) M C-Petersen (Denmark) M P Kolding	21	21
(Indonesia) M Ahsan (Indonesia) A Pratama	15	10
(Denmark) K Antonsen (Denmark) N Nohr	18	21	17
(Malaysia) Chooi K M (Malaysia) Low J S	21	19	21
8	(Japan) T Inoue (Japan) Y Kaneko	15	17
(India) S Rankireddy (India) C Shetty	21	21
(Chinese Taipei) Liao M-c (Chinese Taipei) Su C-h	14	21	24
Q3	(Indonesia) A B Cahyono (Indonesia) M R P Isfahani	21	15	22

Second Round
4	(Denmark) M C-Petersen (Denmark) M P Kolding	21	21
(Malaysia) Chooi K M (Malaysia) Low J S	11	17
(India) S Rankireddy (India) C Shetty	21	21
(Chinese Taipei) Liao M-c (Chinese Taipei) Su C-h	17	16

Quarterfinals
4	(Denmark) M C-Petersen (Denmark) M P Kolding	21	21	19
(India) S Rankireddy (India) C Shetty	23	15	21

=== Bottom half ===
==== Section 3 ====
First Round
(Denmark) M Christiansen (Denmark) D Daugaard	18	13
(Malaysia) Goh V S (Malaysia) Tan W K	21	21
(Indonesia) W Nayaka (Indonesia) A Yusuf	16	17
5	(Chinese Taipei) Lee J-h (Chinese Taipei) Lee Y	21	21
Q2	(China) Lu K (China) Zheng SW	21	21
Q4	(Indonesia) H A Gunawan (Indonesia) M Kido	11	14
(Hong Kong) Lee C H (Hong Kong) Tang C M	14	21	13
3	(China) Liu C (China) Zhang N	21	18	21

Second Round
(Malaysia) Goh V S (Malaysia) Tan W K	21	16	21
5	(Chinese Taipei) Lee J-h (Chinese Taipei) Lee Y	15	21	13
Q2	(China) Lu K (China) Zheng SW	14	16
3	(China) Liu C (China) Zhang N	21	21

Quarterfinals
(Malaysia) Goh V S (Malaysia) Tan W K	18	22	12
3	(China) Liu C (China) Zhang N	21	20	21

==== Section 4 ====
First Round
(Chinese Taipei) Lu C-y (Chinese Taipei) Yang P-h	21	16	21
(India) M Attri (India) B. S Reddy	18	21	16
(Japan) H Endo (Japan) Y Watanabe	16	15
6	(Russia) V Ivanov (Russia) I Sozonov	21	21
(Indonesia) F Alfian (Indonesia) M R Ardianto	22	21
(Hong Kong) Law C H (Hong Kong) Or C C	20	9
(Denmark) K Astrup (Denmark) A S Rasmussen	15	22	16
2	(China) Li JH (China) Liu YC	21	20	21

Second Round
(Chinese Taipei) Lu C-y (Chinese Taipei) Yang P-h	13	21	21
6	(Russia) V Ivanov (Russia) I Sozonov	21	19	14
(Indonesia) F Alfian (Indonesia) M R Ardianto	15	12
2	(China) Li JH (China) Liu YC	21	21

Quarterfinals
(Chinese Taipei) Lu C-y (Chinese Taipei) Yang P-h	21	17	10
2	(China) Li JH (China) Liu YC	12	21	21

== Women's doubles ==
=== Seeds ===
1. (China) Chen Qingchen / Jia Yifan (second round)
2. (Japan) Misaki Matsutomo / Ayaka Takahashi (champions)
3. (Denmark) Kamilla Rytter Juhl / Christinna Pedersen (semifinals)
4. (Japan) Shiho Tanaka / Koharu Yonemoto (withdrew)
5. (South Korea) Lee So-hee / Shin Seung-chan (semifinals)
6. (Thailand) Jongkolphan Kititharakul / Rawinda Prajongjai (quarterfinals)
7. (South Korea) Chang Ye-na / Jung Kyung-eun (quarterfinals)
8. (Indonesia) Greysia Polii / Apriyani Rahayu (final)

=== Finals ===
Semifinals
5	(South Korea) Lee So-hee (South Korea) Shin Seung-chan	11	21	17
8	(Indonesia) Greysia Polii (Indonesia) Apriyani Rahayu	21	17	21
3	(Denmark) Kamilla Rytter Juhl (Denmark) Christinna Pedersen	25	15	16
2	(Japan) Misaki Matsutomo (Japan) Ayaka Takahashi	23	21	21

Final
8	(Indonesia) Greysia Polii (Indonesia) Apriyani Rahayu	17	12
2	(Japan) Misaki Matsutomo (Japan) Ayaka Takahashi	21	21

=== Top half ===
==== Section 1 ====
First Round
1	(China) Chen QC (China) Jia YF	21	21
PFQ	(Indonesia) Z F Azka (Indonesia) B M Rumambi	11	13
(Indonesia) D D Haris (Indonesia) R A Pradipta	21	21
Q4	(Indonesia) N P Lestari (Indonesia) T R Nuraidah	11	9
5	(South Korea) Lee S-h (South Korea) Shin S-c	21	21
(China) Tang JH (China) Yu XH	19	7
PFQ	(Indonesia) A G L Maharani (Indonesia) A R Putri	7	18
Q2	(Indonesia) F D Kusuma (Indonesia) R Sugiarto	21	21

Second Round
1	(China) Chen QC (China) Jia YF	15	11
(Indonesia) D D Haris (Indonesia) R A Pradipta	21	21
5	(South Korea) Lee S-h (South Korea) Shin S-c	21	21
Q2	(Indonesia) F D Kusuma (Indonesia) R Sugiarto	12	13

Quarterfinals
(Indonesia) D D Haris (Indonesia) R A Pradipta	12	17
5	(South Korea) Lee S-h (South Korea) Shin S-c	21	21

==== Section 2 ====
First Round
PFQ	(Indonesia) F V D Gani (Indonesia) L A Kusumawati	18	11
(South Korea) Chae Y-j (South Korea) Kim H-r	21	21
(Indonesia) K N Hanadia (Indonesia) D T Permatasari	16	15
Q3	(Chinese Taipei) Lin Y-c (Chinese Taipei) Pai Y-p	21	21
8	(Indonesia) G Polii (Indonesia) A Rahayu	21	21
PFQ	(Indonesia) T O Kusumah (Indonesia) V A Sukoco	6	18
(Denmark) J Finne-Ipsen (Denmark) R Søby	21	16	10
(Indonesia) A Imanuela (Indonesia) S F S Ramadhanti	16	21	21

Second Round
(South Korea) Chae Y-j (South Korea) Kim H-r	21	21
Q3	(Chinese Taipei) Lin Y-c (Chinese Taipei) Pai Y-p	13	18
8	(Indonesia) G Polii (Indonesia) A Rahayu	21	21
(Indonesia) A Imanuela (Indonesia) S F S Ramadhanti	11	16

Quarterfinals
(South Korea) Chae Y-j (South Korea) Kim H-r	16	15
8	(Indonesia) G Polii (Indonesia) A Rahayu	21	21

=== Bottom half ===
==== Section 3 ====
First Round
(Chinese Taipei) Lin X-m (Chinese Taipei) Wu F-c	16	15
(Denmark) M Fruergaard (Denmark) S Thygesen	21	21
(Indonesia) S Kani (Indonesia) V Putri	14	21	11
6	(Thailand) J Kititharakul (Thailand) R Prajongjai	21	19	21
(Chinese Taipei) Hsu Y-c (Chinese Taipei) Wu T-j	21	21
Q1	(Indonesia) M I Cindiani (Indonesia) I C S Jamil	15	10
(Malaysia) V Hoo K M (Malaysia) Woon K W	9	16
3	(Denmark) K R Juhl (Denmark) C Pedersen	21	21

Second Round
(Denmark) M Fruergaard (Denmark) S Thygesen	19	16
6	(Thailand) J Kititharakul (Thailand) R Prajongjai	21	21
(Chinese Taipei) Hsu Y-c (Chinese Taipei) Wu T-j	12	16
3	(Denmark) K R Juhl (Denmark) C Pedersen	21	21

Quarterfinals
6	(Thailand) J Kititharakul (Thailand) R Prajongjai	18	10
3	(Denmark) K R Juhl (Denmark) C Pedersen	21	21

==== Section 4 ====
First Round
(China) Liu XX (China) Zhou CM	16	14
(Indonesia) Y Barkah (Indonesia) N K Maheswari	21	21
(Indonesia) A S Awanda (Indonesia) N K M Istarani	15	12
7	(South Korea) Chang Y-n (South Korea) Jung K-e	21	21
(Chinese Taipei) Chiang K-h (Chinese Taipei) Hung S-h	13	21	21
(Indonesia) D Fitriani (Indonesia) N Melati	21	19	12
(China) Huang DP (China) Li WM	12	15
2	(Japan) M Matsutomo (Japan) A Takahashi	21	21

Second Round
(Indonesia) Y Barkah (Indonesia) N K Maheswari	11	21	17
7	(South Korea) Chang Y-n (South Korea) Jung K-e	21	19	21
(Chinese Taipei) Chiang K-h (Chinese Taipei) Hung S-h	12	12
2	(Japan) M Matsutomo (Japan) A Takahashi	21	21

Quarterfinals
7	(South Korea) Chang Y-n (South Korea) Jung K-e	14	8
2	(Japan) M Matsutomo (Japan) A Takahashi	21	21

== Mixed doubles ==
=== Seeds ===
1. (Indonesia) Tontowi Ahmad / Liliyana Natsir (final)
2. (China) Wang Yilü / Huang Dongping (first round)
3. (England) Chris Adcock / Gabrielle Adcock (withdrew)
4. (Hong Kong) Tang Chun Man / Tse Ying Suet (quarterfinals)
5. (South Korea) Seo Seung-jae / Kim Ha-na (second round)
6. (China) Zheng Siwei / Huang Yaqiong (champions)
7. (Malaysia) Tan Kian Meng / Lai Pei Jing (quarterfinals)
8. (Denmark) Mathias Christiansen / Christina Pedersen (second round)

=== Finals ===
Semifinals
1	(Indonesia) Tontowi Ahmad (Indonesia) Liliyana Natsir	22	21
(Indonesia) Praveen Jordan (Indonesia) Melati Daeva Oktavianti	20	17
6	(China) Zheng Siwei (China) Huang Yaqiong	21	21
(Malaysia) Goh Soon Huat (Malaysia) Shevon Jemie Lai	18	14

Final
1	(Indonesia) Tontowi Ahmad (Indonesia) Liliyana Natsir	14	11
6	(China) Zheng Siwei (China) Huang Yaqiong	21	21

=== Top half ===
==== Section 1 ====
First Round
1	(Indonesia) T Ahmad (Indonesia) L Natsir	23	21
PFQ	(Indonesia) R Widianto (Indonesia) M Mahmudin	21	17
(Chinese Taipei) Lee Y (Chinese Taipei) Hsu Y-c	21	21
(France) R Labar (France) A Fontaine	19	19
8	(Denmark) M Christiansen (Denmark) C Pedersen	21	21
(Indonesia) L A Nugroho (Indonesia) R Amelia	15	17
(Denmark) A S Rasmussen (Denmark) L Kjærsfeldt	18	14
PFQ	(China) Zhang N (China) Liu XX	21	21

Second Round
1	(Indonesia) T Ahmad (Indonesia) L Natsir	21	21
(Chinese Taipei) Lee Y (Chinese Taipei) Hsu Y-c	12	10
8	(Denmark) M Christiansen (Denmark) C Pedersen	19	21	15
PFQ	(China) Zhang N (China) Liu XX	21	17	21

Quarterfinals
1	(Indonesia) T Ahmad (Indonesia) L Natsir	21	21
PFQ	(China) Zhang N (China) Liu XX	18	19

==== Section 2 ====
First Round
PFQ	(Indonesia) Y E Saputra (Indonesia) M G Islami	14	21	21
Q2	(Indonesia) A Ramadiansyah (Indonesia) M C Bandaso	21	16	17
(Indonesia) R K Suwardi (Indonesia) D Susanto	15	21	21
(Hong Kong) Lee C H (Hong Kong) Chau H W	21	12	10
5	(South Korea) Seo S-j (South Korea) Kim H-n	16	21	21
(Chinese Taipei) Lu C-y (Chinese Taipei) Chiang K-h	21	18	11
(Indonesia) P Jordan (Indonesia) M D Oktavianti	21	16	21
Q3	(Indonesia) R Alexander (Indonesia) W O Kandow	19	21	13

Second Round
PFQ	(Indonesia) Y E Saputra (Indonesia) M G Islami	21	10	21
(Indonesia) R K Suwardi (Indonesia) D Susanto	15	21	14
5	(South Korea) Seo S-j (South Korea) Kim H-n	15	16
(Indonesia) P Jordan (Indonesia) M D Oktavianti	21	21

Quarterfinals
PFQ	(Indonesia) Y E Saputra (Indonesia) M G Islami	11	21	17
(Indonesia) P Jordan (Indonesia) M D Oktavianti	21	18	21

=== Bottom half ===
==== Section 3 ====
First Round
Q4	(Malaysia) Chen T J (Malaysia) Peck Y W	23	23	18
(Chinese Taipei) Wang C-l (Chinese Taipei) Lee C-h	25	21	21
(Japan) Y Watanabe (Japan) A Higashino	18	7
6	(China) Zheng SW (China) Huang YQ	21	21
(Russia) V Durkin (Russia) N Vislova	19	21	21
(Indonesia) H Faizal (Indonesia) G E Widjaja	21	19	16
(France) B Kersaudy (France) L Palermo	12	19
4	(Hong Kong) Tang C M (Hong Kong) Tse Y S	21	21

Second Round
(Chinese Taipei) Wang C-l (Chinese Taipei) Lee C-h	8	21	16
6	(China) Zheng SW (China) Huang YQ	21	16	21
(Russia) V Durkin (Russia) N Vislova
4	(Hong Kong) Tang C M (Hong Kong) Tse Y S	w	/	o

Quarterfinals
6	(China) Zheng SW (China) Huang YQ	21	21
4	(Hong Kong) Tang C M (Hong Kong) Tse Y S	14	15

==== Section 4 ====
First Round
Q1	(Indonesia) R Rivaldy (Indonesia) A Wiratama	17	21	21
PFQ	(Malaysia) M A Abdul Latif (Indonesia) R A Riodingin	21	12	12
(Denmark) N Nøhr (Denmark) S Thygesen	20	11
7	(Malaysia) Tan K M (Malaysia) Lai P J	22	21
(South Korea) Choi S-g (South Korea) Chae Y-j	21	21
(China) Lu K (China) Zhou CM	19	16
(Malaysia) Goh S H (Malaysia) S J Lai	12	21	21
2	(China) Wang YL (China) Huang DP	21	19	19

Second Round
Q1	(Indonesia) R Rivaldy (Indonesia) A Wiratama	18	12
7	(Malaysia) Tan K M (Malaysia) Lai P J	21	21
(South Korea) Choi S-g (South Korea) Chae Y-j	17	15
(Malaysia) Goh S H (Malaysia) S J Lai	21	21

Quarterfinals
7	(Malaysia) Tan K M (Malaysia) Lai P J	21	16	16
(Malaysia) Goh S H (Malaysia) S J Lai	15	21	21

Preceded by 2018 Malaysia Masters	BWF World Tour; 2018 BWF season	Succeeded by 2018 India Open
