= 2019 Thailand Open (badminton) =

2019 badminton tournament in Bangkok

Tournament details
- Dates: 30 July – 4 August
- Level: Super 500
- Total prize money: US$350,000
- Venue: Indoor Stadium Huamark
- Location: Bangkok, Thailand

Champions
- Men's singles: (Chinese Taipei) Chou Tien-chen
- Women's singles: (China) Chen Yufei
- Men's doubles: (India) Satwiksairaj Rankireddy (India) Chirag Shetty
- Women's doubles: (Japan) Shiho Tanaka (Japan) Koharu Yonemoto
- Mixed doubles: (China) Wang Yilü (China) Huang Dongping

The 2019 Thailand Open (officially known as the Toyota Thailand Open 2019 for sponsorship reasons) was a badminton tournament which took place at Indoor Stadium Huamark in Bangkok, Thailand, from 30 July to 4 August 2019 and had a total purse of $350,000.

== Tournament ==
The 2019 Thailand Open was the sixteenth tournament of the 2019 BWF World Tour and also part of the Thailand Open championships, which had been held since 1984. This tournament was organized by the Badminton Association of Thailand with sanction from the BWF.

=== Venue ===
This international tournament was held at Indoor Stadium Huamark in Bangkok, Thailand.

=== Point distribution ===
Below is the point distribution table for each phase of the tournament based on the BWF points system for the BWF World Tour Super 500 event.

| Winner | Runner-up | 3/4 | 5/8 | 9/16 | 17/32 | 33/64 | 65/128 |
|---|---|---|---|---|---|---|---|
| 9,200 | 7,800 | 6,420 | 5,040 | 3,600 | 2,220 | 880 | 430 |

=== Prize money ===
The total prize money for this tournament was US$355,000. Distribution of prize money was in accordance with BWF regulations.

| Event | Winner | Finals | Semi-finals | Quarter-finals | Last 16 |
| Singles | $26,250 | $13,300 | $5,075 | $2,100 | $1,225 |
| Doubles | $27,650 | $13,300 | $4,900 | $2,537.50 | $1,312.50 |

== Men's singles ==
=== Seeds ===
1. (Japan) Kento Momota (withdrew)
2. (China) Shi Yuqi (withdrew)
3. (Chinese Taipei) Chou Tien-chen (champion)
4. (China) Chen Long (first round)
5. (India) Srikanth Kidambi (second round)
6. (Japan) Kenta Nishimoto (quarter-finals)
7. (Japan) Kanta Tsuneyama (semi-finals)
8. (India) Sameer Verma (first round)

=== Finals ===
Semi-finals
7 | (Japan) Kanta Tsuneyama | 9 | 21
(Hong Kong) Ng Ka Long | 21 | 23
3 | (Chinese Taipei) Chou Tien-chen | 21 | 22
(Malaysia) Lee Zii Jia | 14 | 20

Final
(Hong Kong) Ng Ka Long | 14 | 21 | 21
3 | (Chinese Taipei) Chou Tien-chen | 21 | 11 | 23

=== Top half ===
==== Section 1 ====
First Round
1 | (Japan) K Momota
(India) S Dey | w | / | o
(Thailand) K Wangcharoen | 21 | 17 | 15
(India) B. Sai Praneeth | 17 | 21 | 21
7 | (Japan) K Tsuneyama | 23 | 19 | 21
Q1 | (India) So Verma | 21 | 21 | 5
(Thailand) S Thammasin | 21 | 21
(Netherlands) M Caljouw | 15 | 18

Second Round
(India) S Dey | 18 | 19
(India) B. Sai Praneeth | 21 | 21
7 | (Japan) K Tsuneyama | 18 | 21 | 21
(Thailand) S Thammasin | 21 | 11 | 12

Quarter-finals
(India) B. Sai Praneeth | 18 | 12
7 | (Japan) K Tsuneyama | 21 | 21

==== Section 2 ====
First Round
4 | (China) Chen L | 13 | 18
(Chinese Taipei) Wang T-w | 21 | 21
(Hong Kong) Ng K L | 21 | 21
(Malaysia) Liew D | 13 | 16
5 | (India) S Kidambi | 21 | 17 | 21
Q4 | (China) Ren PB | 13 | 21 | 19
(Thailand) K Phetpradab | 21 | 21
(Hong Kong) Lee C Y | 19 | 15

Second Round
(Chinese Taipei) Wang T-w | 17 | 14
(Hong Kong) Ng K L | 21 | 21
5 | (India) S Kidambi | 21 | 16 | 12
(Thailand) K Phetpradab | 11 | 21 | 21

Quarter-finals
(Hong Kong) Ng K L | 22 | 17 | 21
(Thailand) K Phetpradab | 20 | 21 | 17

=== Bottom half ===
==== Section 3 ====
First Round
(India) Prannoy K | 21 | 22
(Hong Kong) Wong W K | 16 | 20
Q3 | (Indonesia) S D Kuncoro | 17 | 11
6 | (Japan) K Nishimoto | 21 | 21
(India) P Kashyap | 18 | 21 | 21
PFQ | (Israel) M Zilberman | 21 | 8 | 14
(South Korea) Lee D-k | 13 | 13
3 | (Chinese Taipei) Chou T-c | 21 | 21

Second Round
(India) Prannoy K | 17 | 10
6 | (Japan) K Nishimoto | 21 | 21
(India) P Kashyap | 9 | 14
3 | (Chinese Taipei) Chou T-c | 21 | 21

Quarter-finals
6 | (Japan) K Nishimoto | 12 | 16
3 | (Chinese Taipei) Chou T-c | 21 | 21

==== Section 4 ====
First Round
(Indonesia) T Sugiarto | 21 | 12 | 21
(China) Zhao JP | 13 | 21 | 13
(Malaysia) Lee Z J | 21 | 21 | 21
8 | (India) Sa Verma | 23 | 11 | 5
(China) Lin D | 21 | 11
(Thailand) S Avihingsanon | 17 | 8^{r}
Q2 | (France) L Claerbout | 21 | 22 | 13
PFQ | (Indonesia) S H Rhustavito | 23 | 20 | 21

Second Round
(Indonesia) T Sugiarto | 14 | 21 | 8
(Malaysia) Lee Z J | 21 | 12 | 21
(China) Lin D | 21 | 15 | 10
PFQ | (Indonesia) S H Rhustavito | 12 | 21 | 21

Quarter-finals
(Malaysia) Lee Z J | 11 | 21 | 21
PFQ | (Indonesia) S H Rhustavito | 21 | 14 | 13

== Women's singles ==
=== Seeds ===
1. (China) Chen Yufei (champion)
2. (Japan) Nozomi Okuhara (withdrew)
3. (Japan) Akane Yamaguchi (withdrew)
4. (India) P. V. Sindhu (withdrew)
5. (China) He Bingjiao (second round)
6. (Thailand) Ratchanok Intanon (final)
7. (India) Saina Nehwal (second round)
8. (South Korea) Sung Ji-hyun (second round)

=== Finals ===
Semi-finals
1 | (China) Chen Yufei | 21 | 21
(Japan) Sayaka Takahashi | 16 | 19
6 | (Thailand) Ratchanok Intanon | 23 | 17 | 21
(Thailand) Pornpawee Chochuwong | 21 | 21 | 19

Final
1 | (China) Chen Yufei | 22 | 21
6 | (Thailand) Ratchanok Intanon | 20 | 18

=== Top half ===
==== Section 1 ====
First Round
1 | (China) Chen YF | 21 | 21
(South Korea) An S-y | 12 | 17
Q4 | (Indonesia) Y Y Susanto | 21 | 13
(South Korea) Kim G-e | 23 | 21
5 | (China) He BJ | 22 | 21
(China) Li XR | 20 | 14
Q2 | (Thailand) S Katethong | 21 | 14 | 19
(Malaysia) S Cheah S Y | 11 | 21 | 21

Second Round
1 | (China) Chen YF | 21 | 21
(South Korea) Kim G-e | 10 | 16
5 | (China) He BJ | 15 | 12
(Malaysia) S Cheah S Y | 21 | 21

Quarter-finals
1 | (China) Chen YF | 21 | 21
(Malaysia) S Cheah S Y | 15 | 8

==== Section 2 ====
First Round
PFQ | (Indonesia) L A Mainaky | 13 | 21 | 21
(Russia) E Kosetskaya | 21 | 18 | 14
(Indonesia) Fitriani | 13 | 21 | 24
(Hong Kong) Yip P Y | 21 | 13 | 22
7 | (India) S Nehwal | 21 | 21
Q3 | (Thailand) P Chaiwan | 17 | 19
(Japan) S Takahashi | 21 | 21
(Indonesia) R Hartawan | 8 | 10

Second Round
PFQ | (Indonesia) L A Mainaky | 13 | 5
(Indonesia) Fitriani | 21 | 21
7 | (India) S Nehwal | 21 | 11 | 14
(Japan) S Takahashi | 16 | 21 | 21

Quarter-finals
(Indonesia) Fitriani | 20 | 21 | 14
(Japan) S Takahashi | 22 | 15 | 21

=== Bottom half ===
==== Section 3 ====
First Round
(Thailand) N Jindapol | 13 | 21 | 21
(Thailand) B Ongbamrungphan | 21 | 12 | 12
(Germany) Y Li | 13 | 8
6 | (Thailand) R Intanon | 21 | 21
Q1 | (India) S U R Chukka | 17 | 7
(China) Chen XX | 21 | 21
(China) Han Y | 21 | 21
PFQ | (Vietnam) Nguyễn T L | 17 | 14

Second Round
(Thailand) N Jindapol | 21 | 11 | 11
6 | (Thailand) R Intanon | 17 | 21 | 21
(China) Chen XX | 21 | 21
(China) Han Y | 15 | 16

Quarter-finals
6 | (Thailand) R Intanon | 21 | 21
(China) Chen XX | 17 | 15

==== Section 4 ====
First Round
(Thailand) P Chochuwong | 21 | 21
(Japan) A Ohori | 13 | 18
(Indonesia) G M Tunjung | 20 | 17
8 | (South Korea) Sung J-h | 22 | 21
(China) Cai YY | 9 | 18
(Hong Kong) Cheung N Y | 21 | 21
(United States) Zhang BW | 21 | 21
PFQ | (Thailand) P Buranaprasertsuk | 9 | 14

Second Round
(Thailand) P Chochuwong | 21 | 21
8 | (South Korea) Sung J-h | 15 | 19
(Hong Kong) Cheung N Y | 16 | 23 | 21
(United States) Zhang BW | 21 | 21 | 16

Quarter-finals
(Thailand) P Chochuwong | 21 | 15 | 21
(Hong Kong) Cheung N Y | 15 | 21 | 12

== Men's doubles ==
=== Seeds ===
1. (Indonesia) Marcus Fernaldi Gideon / Kevin Sanjaya Sukamuljo (quarter-finals)
2. (Japan) Takeshi Kamura / Keigo Sonoda (first round)
3. (China) Li Junhui / Liu Yuchen (final)
4. (Indonesia) Mohammad Ahsan / Hendra Setiawan (first round)
5. (Japan) Hiroyuki Endo / Yuta Watanabe (semi-finals)
6. (Indonesia) Fajar Alfian / Muhammad Rian Ardianto (second round)
7. (China) Han Chengkai / Zhou Haodong (second round)
8. (Chinese Taipei) Liao Min-chun / Su Ching-heng (first round)

=== Finals ===
Semi-finals
5 | (Japan) Hiroyuki Endo (Japan) Yuta Watanabe | 13 | 20
3 | (China) Li Junhui (China) Liu Yuchen | 21 | 22
(South Korea) Ko Sung-hyun (South Korea) Shin Baek-cheol | 20 | 24 | 9
(India) Satwiksairaj Rankireddy (India) Chirag Shetty | 22 | 22 | 21

Final
3 | (China) Li Junhui (China) Liu Yuchen | 19 | 21 | 18
(India) Satwiksairaj Rankireddy (India) Chirag Shetty | 21 | 18 | 21

=== Top half ===
==== Section 1 ====
First Round
1 | (Indonesia) M F Gideon (Indonesia) K S Sukamuljo | 21 | 21
(Russia) V Ivanov (Russia) I Sozonov | 14 | 10
(China) Ou XY (China) Zhang N | 15 | 21 | 24
(China) He JT (China) Tan Q | 21 | 18 | 22
5 | (Japan) H Endo (Japan) Y Watanabe | 21 | 21
Q2 | (Indonesia) S K Gutama (Indonesia) F W Putra | 13 | 13
(Indonesia) R K Suwardi (Indonesia) A Pratama | 12 | 15
(Netherlands) J Maas (Netherlands) R Tabeling | 21 | 21

Second Round
1 | (Indonesia) M F Gideon (Indonesia) K S Sukamuljo | 16 | 21 | 21
(China) Ou XY (China) Zhang N | 21 | 13 | 14
5 | (Japan) H Endo (Japan) Y Watanabe | 21 | 21
(Netherlands) J Maas (Netherlands) R Tabeling | 9 | 10

Quarter-finals
1 | (Indonesia) M F Gideon (Indonesia) K S Sukamuljo | 17 | 21 | 14
5 | (Japan) H Endo (Japan) Y Watanabe | 21 | 19 | 21

==== Section 2 ====
First Round
3 | (China) Li JH (China) Liu YC | 21 | 20 | 21
(Japan) T Inoue (Japan) Y Kaneko | 9 | 22 | 18
Q3 | (South Korea) Kim G-j (South Korea) Kim S-r | 15 | 21 | 17
(Chinese Taipei) Lu C-y (Chinese Taipei) Yang P-h | 21 | 18 | 21
7 | (China) Han CK (China) Zhou HD | 16 | 21 | 21
(Germany) M Lamsfuß (Germany) M E Seidel | 21 | 8 | 19
(Indonesia) B Angriawan (Indonesia) Hardianto | 11 | 10
(Malaysia) Goh V S (Malaysia) Tan W K | 21 | 21

Second Round
3 | (China) Li JH (China) Liu YC | 21 | 11 | 21
(Chinese Taipei) Lu C-y (Chinese Taipei) Yang P-h | 17 | 21 | 11
7 | (China) Han CK (China) Zhou HD | 21 | 16 | 18
(Malaysia) Goh V S (Malaysia) Tan W K | 19 | 21 | 21

Quarter-finals
3 | (China) Li JH (China) Liu YC | 21 | 21
(Malaysia) Goh V S (Malaysia) Tan W K | 16 | 19

=== Bottom half ===
==== Section 3 ====
First Round
(Thailand) B Isara (Thailand) M Jongjit | 15 | 21 | 20
Q4 | (China) Huang KX (China) Liu C | 21 | 18 | 22
(Malaysia) A Chia (Malaysia) Soh W Y | 21 | 21
8 | (Chinese Taipei) Liao M-c (Chinese Taipei) Su C-h | 19 | 14
(Malaysia) M Arif A L (Malaysia) N M Azriyn A | 13 | 16
(South Korea) Ko S-h (South Korea) Shin B-c | 21 | 21
(Malaysia) Ong Y S (Malaysia) Teo E Y | 18 | 21 | 23
4 | (Indonesia) M Ahsan (Indonesia) H Setiawan | 21 | 16 | 21

Second Round
Q4 | (China) Huang KX (China) Liu C | 22 | 21
(Malaysia) A Chia (Malaysia) Soh W Y | 20 | 17
(South Korea) Ko S-h (South Korea) Shin B-c | 21 | 21
(Malaysia) Ong Y S (Malaysia) Teo E Y | 8 | 17

Quarter-finals
Q4 | (China) Huang KX (China) Liu C | 21 | 19 | 17
(South Korea) Ko S-h (South Korea) Shin B-c | 14 | 21 | 21

==== Section 4 ====
First Round
(India) S Rankireddy (India) C Shetty | 21 | 24 | 21
(India) M Attri (India) B. S Reddy | 11 | 26 | 11
(Japan) T Hoki (Japan) Y Kobayashi | 20 | 19
6 | (Indonesia) F Alfian (Indonesia) M R Ardianto | 22 | 21
(Indonesia) W Nayaka (Indonesia) A Yusuf | 18 | 19
(Chinese Taipei) Lee Y (Chinese Taipei) Wang C-l | 21 | 21
Q1 | (South Korea) Choi S-g (South Korea) Seo S-j | 11 | 22 | 21
2 | (Japan) T Kamura (Japan) K Sonoda | 21 | 20 | 17

Second Round
(India) S Rankireddy (India) C Shetty | 21 | 21
6 | (Indonesia) F Alfian (Indonesia) M R Ardianto | 17 | 19
(Chinese Taipei) Lee Y (Chinese Taipei) Wang C-l | 19 | 20
Q1 | (South Korea) Choi S-g (South Korea) Seo S-j | 21 | 22

Quarter-finals
(India) S Rankireddy (India) C Shetty | 21 | 17 | 21
Q1 | (South Korea) Choi S-g (South Korea) Seo S-j | 17 | 21 | 19

== Women's doubles ==
=== Seeds ===
1. (Japan) Mayu Matsumoto / Wakana Nagahara (quarter-finals)
2. (Japan) Yuki Fukushima / Sayaka Hirota (second round)
3. (Japan) Misaki Matsutomo / Ayaka Takahashi (quarter-finals)
4. (China) Chen Qingchen / Jia Yifan (withdrew)
5. (Indonesia) Greysia Polii / Apriyani Rahayu (quarter-finals)
6. (South Korea) Lee So-hee / Shin Seung-chan (semi-finals)
7. (Japan) Shiho Tanaka / Koharu Yonemoto (champions)
8. (China) Du Yue / Li Yinhui (final)

=== Finals ===
Semi-finals
8 | (China) Du Yue (China) Li Yinhui | 14 | 21 | 22
6 | (South Korea) Lee So-hee (South Korea) Shin Seung-chan | 21 | 19 | 20
7 | (Japan) Shiho Tanaka (Japan) Koharu Yonemoto | 21 | 21
(South Korea) Chang Ye-na (South Korea) Kim Hye-rin | 19 | 19

Final
8 | (China) Du Yue (China) Li Yinhui | 19 | 21 | 13
7 | (Japan) Shiho Tanaka (Japan) Koharu Yonemoto | 21 | 14 | 21

=== Top half ===
==== Section 1 ====
First Round
1 | (Japan) M Matsumoto (Japan) W Nagahara | 21 | 13 | 21
(Thailand) P Supajirakul (Thailand) S Taerattanachai | 14 | 21 | 6
(South Korea) Baek H-n (South Korea) Jung K-e | 21 | 21
(Hong Kong) Ng T Y (Hong Kong) Yuen S Y | 12 | 7
8 | (China) Du Y (China) Li YH | 21 | 21
(Thailand) C Chaladchalam (Thailand) P Muenwong | 11 | 12
(Malaysia) V Hoo K M (Malaysia) Yap C W | 14 | 16
(South Korea) Kim S-y (South Korea) Kong H-y | 21 | 21

Second Round
1 | (Japan) M Matsumoto (Japan) W Nagahara | 21 | 21
(South Korea) Baek H-n (South Korea) Jung K-e | 16 | 19
8 | (China) Du Y (China) Li YH | 21 | 21
(South Korea) Kim S-y (South Korea) Kong H-y | 15 | 15

Quarter-finals
1 | (Japan) M Matsumoto (Japan) W Nagahara | 18 | 21 | 15
8 | (China) Du Y (China) Li YH | 21 | 18 | 21

==== Section 2 ====
First Round
PFQ | (Hong Kong) Ng W Y (Hong Kong) Yeung N T | 17 | 12
(China) Liu XX (China) Xia YT | 21 | 21
(India) A Ponnappa (India) N S Reddy | 7 | 13
(China) Li WM (China) Zheng Y | 21 | 21
6 | (South Korea) Lee S-h (South Korea) Shin S-c | 21 | 21
Q2 | (China) Chen L (China) Yu XH | 16 | 12
(Thailand) J Kititharakul (Thailand) R Prajongjai | 21 | 21
(Malaysia) Chow M K (Malaysia) Lee M Y | 14 | 17

Second Round
(China) Liu XX (China) Xia YT | 17 | 13
(China) Li WM (China) Zheng Y | 21 | 21
6 | (South Korea) Lee S-h (South Korea) Shin S-c | 21 | 21
(Thailand) J Kititharakul (Thailand) R Prajongjai | 15 | 18

Quarter-finals
(China) Li WM (China) Zheng Y | 21 | 15 | 15
6 | (South Korea) Lee S-h (South Korea) Shin S-c | 9 | 21 | 21

=== Bottom half ===
==== Section 3 ====
First Round
(China) Dong WJ (China) Feng XY | 16 | 21 | 13
(Japan) A Sakuramoto (Japan) Y Takahata | 21 | 10 | 21
(Indonesia) D D Haris (Indonesia) R A Pradipta | 20 | 9
7 | (Japan) S Tanaka (Japan) K Yonemoto | 22 | 21
Q4 | (Thailand) B Aimsaard (Thailand) N Aimsaard | 14 | 16
PFQ | (Chinese Taipei) Hsu Y-c (Chinese Taipei) Hu L-f | 21 | 21
(Russia) E Bolotova (Russia) A Davletova | 10 | 11
3 | (Japan) M Matsutomo (Japan) A Takahashi | 21 | 21

Second Round
(Japan) A Sakuramoto (Japan) Y Takahata | 15 | 23 | 11
7 | (Japan) S Tanaka (Japan) K Yonemoto | 21 | 21 | 21
PFQ | (Chinese Taipei) Hsu Y-c (Chinese Taipei) Hu L-f | 14 | 14
3 | (Japan) M Matsutomo (Japan) A Takahashi | 21 | 21

Quarter-finals
7 | (Japan) S Tanaka (Japan) K Yonemoto | 8 | 21 | 21
3 | (Japan) M Matsutomo (Japan) A Takahashi | 21 | 12 | 11

==== Section 4 ====
First Round
Q1 | (Thailand) C Korepap (Thailand) K Sudjaipraparat | 16 | 16
(France) D Delrue (France) L Palermo | 21 | 21
Q3 | (Indonesia) S F S Ramadhanti (Indonesia) R Sugiarto | 22 | 24
5 | (Indonesia) G Polii (Indonesia) A Rahayu | 24 | 26
(South Korea) Chang Y-n (South Korea) Kim H-r | 12 | 21 | 21
(Indonesia) Y Barkah (Indonesia) J F Sugiarto | 21 | 12 | 14
(France) É Lefel (France) A Tran | 14 | 8
2 | (Japan) Y Fukushima (Japan) S Hirota | 21 | 21

Second Round
(France) D Delrue (France) L Palermo | 20 | 19
5 | (Indonesia) G Polii (Indonesia) A Rahayu | 22 | 21
(South Korea) Chang Y-n (South Korea) Kim H-r | 21 | 21
2 | (Japan) Y Fukushima (Japan) S Hirota | 15 | 9

Quarter-finals
5 | (Indonesia) G Polii (Indonesia) A Rahayu | 21 | 21 | 19
(South Korea) Chang Y-n (South Korea) Kim H-r | 9 | 23 | 21

== Mixed doubles ==
=== Seeds ===
1. (China) Zheng Siwei / Huang Yaqiong (withdrew)
2. (China) Wang Yilü / Huang Dongping (champions)
3. (Japan) Yuta Watanabe / Arisa Higashino (final)
4. (Thailand) Dechapol Puavaranukroh / Sapsiree Taerattanachai (semi-finals)
5. (Malaysia) Chan Peng Soon / Goh Liu Ying (first round)
6. (Indonesia) Hafiz Faizal / Gloria Emanuelle Widjaja (second round)
7. (Indonesia) Praveen Jordan / Melati Daeva Oktavianti (second round)
8. (Hong Kong) Tang Chun Man / Tse Ying Suet (semi-finals)

=== Finals ===
Semi-finals
8 | (Hong Kong) Tang Chun Man (Hong Kong) Tse Ying Suet | 14 | 9
3 | (Japan) Yuta Watanabe (Japan) Arisa Higashino | 21 | 21
4 | (Thailand) Dechapol Puavaranukroh (Thailand) Sapsiree Taerattanachai | 22 | 11 | 14
2 | (China) Wang Yilü (China) Huang Dongping | 20 | 21 | 21

Final
3 | (Japan) Yuta Watanabe (Japan) Arisa Higashino | 22 | 21
2 | (China) Wang Yilü (China) Huang Dongping | 24 | 23

=== Top half ===
==== Section 1 ====
First Round
PFQ | (Denmark) M Christiansen (Denmark) A Bøje | 21 | 19 | 13
(Japan) Y Kaneko (Japan) M Matsutomo | 13 | 21 | 21
PFQ | (Russia) R Alimov (Russia) A Davletova | 16 | 21 | 21
(France) T Gicquel (France) D Delrue | 21 | 16 | 17
8 | (Hong Kong) Tang C M (Hong Kong) Tse Y S | 21 | 21
(Germany) M E Seidel (Germany) L Efler | 10 | 18
(Japan) K Gondo (Japan) A Kurihara | 16 | 13
(India) P Chopra (India) N. S Reddy | 21 | 21

Second Round
(Japan) Y Kaneko (Japan) M Matsutomo | 21 | 21
PFQ | (Russia) R Alimov (Russia) A Davletova | 18 | 16
8 | (Hong Kong) Tang C M (Hong Kong) Tse Y S | 21 | 21
(India) P Chopra (India) N. S Reddy | 16 | 11

Quarter-finals
(Japan) Y Kaneko (Japan) M Matsutomo | 13 | 21 | 15
8 | (Hong Kong) Tang C M (Hong Kong) Tse Y S | 21 | 9 | 21

==== Section 2 ====
First Round
3 | (Japan) Y Watanabe (Japan) A Higashino | 21 | 21
Q3 | (France) R Labar (France) A Tran | 11 | 14
Q4 | (Chinese Taipei) Lee Y (Chinese Taipei) Yang C-t | 11 | 21 | 21
(Hong Kong) Chang T C (Hong Kong) Ng W Y | 21 | 13 | 18
5 | (Malaysia) Chan P S (Malaysia) Goh L Y | 18 | 21 | 17
(India) S Rankireddy (India) A Ponnappa | 21 | 18 | 21
(Indonesia) A E Prasetya (Indonesia) M G Islami | 21 | 21
(Thailand) N Phuangphuapet (Thailand) S Amitrapai | 16 | 16

Second Round
3 | (Japan) Y Watanabe (Japan) A Higashino | 21 | 21
Q4 | (Chinese Taipei) Lee Y (Chinese Taipei) Yang C-t | 12 | 14
(India) S Rankireddy (India) A Ponnappa | 21 | 21
(Indonesia) A E Prasetya (Indonesia) M G Islami | 18 | 19

Quarter-finals
3 | (Japan) Y Watanabe (Japan) A Higashino | 21 | 21
(India) S Rankireddy (India) A Ponnappa | 13 | 15

=== Bottom half ===
==== Section 3 ====
First Round
(Japan) T Hoki (Japan) W Nagahara | 10 | 18
(China) He JT (China) Du Y | 21 | 21
(Malaysia) Goh S H (Malaysia) S J Lai | 21 | 19 | 16
6 | (Indonesia) H Faizal (Indonesia) G E Widjaja | 19 | 21 | 21
(China) Lu K (China) Chen L | 21 | 20 | 24
(Indonesia) T Ahmad (Indonesia) W O Kandow | 14 | 22 | 22
Q1 | (China) Ou XY (China) Feng XY | 16 | 12
4 | (Thailand) D Puavaranukroh (Thailand) S Taerattanachai | 21 | 21

Second Round
(China) He JT (China) Du Y | 23 | 10 | 21
6 | (Indonesia) H Faizal (Indonesia) G E Widjaja | 21 | 21 | 19
(China) Lu K (China) Chen L | 17 | 15
4 | (Thailand) D Puavaranukroh (Thailand) S Taerattanachai | 21 | 21

Quarter-finals
(China) He JT (China) Du Y | 22 | 17 | 14
4 | (Thailand) D Puavaranukroh (Thailand) S Taerattanachai | 20 | 21 | 21

==== Section 4 ====
First Round
(South Korea) Seo S-j (South Korea) Chae Y-j | 21 | 21
(Indonesia) R Alexander (Indonesia) A Saufika | 16 | 15
(Malaysia) Tan K M (Malaysia) Lai P J | 23 | 8
7 | (Indonesia) P Jordan (Indonesia) M D Oktavianti | 25 | 21
(Indonesia) R Rivaldy (Indonesia) P H Mentari | 21 | 14 | 21
(Germany) M Lamsfuß (Germany) I Herttrich | 11 | 21 | 14
Q2 | (China) Ren XY (China) Zhou CM | 21 | 17 | 16
2 | (China) Wang YL (China) Huang DP | 19 | 21 | 21

Second Round
(South Korea) Seo S-j (South Korea) Chae Y-j | 19 | 21 | 21
7 | (Indonesia) P Jordan (Indonesia) M D Oktavianti | 21 | 13 | 11
(Indonesia) R Rivaldy (Indonesia) P H Mentari | 10 | 17
2 | (China) Wang YL (China) Huang DP | 21 | 21

Quarter-finals
(South Korea) Seo S-j (South Korea) Chae Y-j | 19 | 14
2 | (China) Wang YL (China) Huang DP | 21 | 21

| Preceded by 2019 Japan Open | BWF World Tour; 2019 BWF season | Succeeded by 2019 Hyderabad Open |
