= 2018 French Open (badminton) =

2018 badminton tournament in Paris

Tournament details
- Dates: 23–28 October
- Level: Super 750
- Total prize money: US$750,000
- Venue: Stade Pierre de Coubertin
- Location: Paris, France

Champions
- Men's singles: (China) Chen Long
- Women's singles: (Japan) Akane Yamaguchi
- Men's doubles: (China) Han Chengkai (China) Zhou Haodong
- Women's doubles: (Japan) Mayu Matsumoto (Japan) Wakana Nagahara
- Mixed doubles: (China) Zheng Siwei (China) Huang Yaqiong

The 2018 French Open (officially known as the Yonex French Open 2018 for sponsorship reasons) was a badminton tournament which took place at Stade Pierre de Coubertin in Paris, France, from 23 to 28 October 2018 and had a total prize of $750,000.

== Tournament ==
The 2018 French Open is the twenty-first tournament of the 2018 BWF World Tour and also part of the French Open championships, which had been held since 1909. This tournament is organized by French Badminton Federation and sanctioned by the BWF.

=== Venue ===
This international tournament was held at Stade Pierre de Coubertin in Paris, France.

=== Point distribution ===
Below is the point distribution table for each phase of the tournament based on the BWF points system for the BWF World Tour Super 750 event.

| Winner | Runner-up | 3/4 | 5/8 | 9/16 | 17/32 |
|---|---|---|---|---|---|
| 11,000 | 9,350 | 7,700 | 6,050 | 4,320 | 2,660 |

=== Prize money ===
The total prize money for this year's tournament was US$750,000. Distribution of prize money was in accordance with BWF regulations.

| Event | Winner | Finals | Semi-finals | Quarter-finals | Last 16 | Last 32 |
| Singles | $52,500 | $25,500 | $10,500 | $4,125 | $2,250 | $750 |
| Doubles | $55,500 | $26,250 | $10,500 | $4,687.50 | $2,437.50 | $750 |

== Men's singles ==
=== Seeds ===
1. (Japan) Kento Momota (semi-finals)
2. (China) Shi Yuqi (final)
3. (Denmark) Viktor Axelsen (withdrew)
4. (Chinese Taipei) Chou Tien-chen (first round)
5. (India) Srikanth Kidambi (quarter-finals)
6. (China) Chen Long (champion)
7. (South Korea) Son Wan-ho (quarter-finals)
8. (Indonesia) Anthony Sinisuka Ginting (first round)

=== Finals ===
Semi-finals
1 | (Japan) Kento Momota | 18 | 8
6 | (China) Chen Long | 21 | 21
(Denmark) Rasmus Gemke | 11 | 16
2 | (China) Shi Yuqi | 21 | 21

Final
6 | (China) Chen Long | 21 | 21
2 | (China) Shi Yuqi | 17 | 19

=== Top half ===
==== Section 1 ====
First Round
1 | (Japan) K Momota | 21 | 21
(Chinese Taipei) Hsu J-h | 19 | 12
(Japan) K Sakai | 9 | 21 | 21
(China) Lin D | 21 | 14 | 14
5 | (India) S Kidambi | 21 | 21
(Hong Kong) Wong W K | 19 | 13
(Thailand) K Phetpradab | 21 | 10 | 15
(South Korea) Lee D-k | 10 | 21 | 21

Second Round
1 | (Japan) K Momota | 21 | 21
(Japan) K Sakai | 17 | 17
5 | (India) S Kidambi | 12 | 21 | 21
(South Korea) Lee D-k | 21 | 16 | 18

Quarter-finals
1 | (Japan) K Momota | 21 | 21
5 | (India) S Kidambi | 16 | 19

==== Section 2 ====
First Round
PFR | (Brazil) Y Coelho | 13 | 17
(India) B. Sai Praneeth | 21 | 21
(India) S Verma | 21 | 17 | 15
(Indonesia) J Christie | 16 | 21 | 21
6 | (China) Chen L | 21 | 21
(France) B Leverdez | 11 | 13
PFR | (Denmark) J Ø. Jørgensen | 24 | 21
(China) Huang YX | 22 | 17

Second Round
(India) B. Sai Praneeth | 16 | 14
(Indonesia) J Christie | 21 | 21
6 | (China) Chen L | 21 | 21
PFR | (Denmark) J Ø. Jørgensen | 10 | 14

Quarter-finals
(Indonesia) J Christie | 18 | 21 | 16
6 | (China) Chen L | 21 | 12 | 21

=== Bottom half ===
==== Section 3 ====
First Round
(England) R Ouseph | 21 | 21
(Malaysia) Liew D | 19 | 17
(Thailand) K Wangcharoen | 22 | 21
8 | (Indonesia) A S Ginting | 20 | 12
(Netherlands) M Caljouw | 7 | 21 | 14
(Denmark) H-K Vittinghus | 21 | 17 | 21
(Denmark) R Gemke | 21 | 18 | 21
4 | (Chinese Taipei) Chou T-c | 11 | 21 | 12

Second Round
(England) R Ouseph | 7 | 15
(Thailand) K Wangcharoen | 21 | 21
(Denmark) H-K Vittinghus | 17 | 21 | 15
(Denmark) R Gemke | 21 | 19 | 21

Quarter-finals
(Thailand) K Wangcharoen | 21 | 11 | 17
(Denmark) R Gemke | 12 | 21 | 21

==== Section 4 ====
First Round
(Japan) K Nishimoto | 21 | 21
PFR | (France) L Corvée | 16 | 17
(Indonesia) T Sugiarto | 21 | 24 | 20
7 | (South Korea) Son W-h | 16 | 26 | 22
(Hong Kong) Ng K L | 21 | 21
(Thailand) S Avihingsanon | 17 | 15
(Japan) K Tsuneyama | 14 | 16
2 | (China) Shi YQ | 21 | 21

Second Round
(Japan) K Nishimoto | 14 | 18
7 | (South Korea) Son W-h | 21 | 21
(Hong Kong) Ng K L | 7 | 10
2 | (China) Shi YQ | 21 | 21

Quarter-finals
7 | (South Korea) Son W-h | 11 | 13
2 | (China) Shi YQ | 21 | 21

== Women's singles ==
=== Seeds ===
1. (Chinese Taipei) Tai Tzu-ying (final)
2. (Japan) Akane Yamaguchi (champion)
3. (India) P. V. Sindhu (quarter-finals)
4. (China) Chen Yufei (semi-finals)
5. (Spain) Carolina Marín (withdrew)
6. (Thailand) Ratchanok Intanon (quarter-finals)
7. (China) He Bingjiao (semi-finals)
8. (Japan) Nozomi Okuhara (second round)

=== Finals ===
Semi-finals
1 | (Chinese Taipei) Tai Tzu-ying | 18 | 21 | 21
4 | (China) Chen Yufei | 21 | 12 | 14
7 | (China) He Bingjiao | 22 | 19 | 19
2 | (Japan) Akane Yamaguchi | 20 | 21 | 21

Final
1 | (Chinese Taipei) Tai Tzu-ying | 20 | 21 | 13
2 | (Japan) Akane Yamaguchi | 22 | 17 | 21

=== Top half ===
==== Section 1 ====
First Round
1 | (Chinese Taipei) Tai T-y | 21 | 21
(Denmark) L Kjærsfeldt | 9 | 14
(Japan) A Ohori | 21 | 18
(China) Gao FJ | 23 | 21
8 | (Japan) N Okuhara | 21 | 21
(Spain) B Corrales | 10 | 12
(India) S Nehwal | 21 | 21
(Japan) S Kawakami | 11 | 11

Second Round
1 | (Chinese Taipei) Tai T-y | 21 | 21
(China) Gao FJ | 12 | 17
8 | (Japan) N Okuhara | 21 | 14 | 17
(India) S Nehwal | 10 | 21 | 21

Quarter-finals
1 | (Chinese Taipei) Tai T-y | 22 | 21
(India) S Nehwal | 20 | 11

==== Section 2 ====
First Round
4 | (China) Chen YF | 20 | 21 | 21
(Thailand) N Jindapol | 22 | 14 | 8
(Japan) S Takahashi | 21 | 21
(Scotland) K Gilmour | 17 | 9
6 | (Thailand) R Intanon | 21 | 21
PFR | (Canada) R Honderich | 16 | 10
(China) Chen XX | 21 | 16 | 21
(Russia) E Kosetskaya | 16 | 21 | 13

Second Round
4 | (China) Chen YF | 21 | 21
(Japan) S Takahashi | 19 | 13
6 | (Thailand) R Intanon | 21 | 21
(China) Chen XX | 18 | 15

Quarter-finals
4 | (China) Chen YF | 16 | 21 | 21
6 | (Thailand) R Intanon | 21 | 16 | 13

=== Bottom half ===
==== Section 3 ====
First Round
(Thailand) B Ongbamrungphan | 10 | 21 | 15
(South Korea) Sung J-h | 21 | 12 | 21
(Indonesia) Fitriani | 17 | 19
7 | (China) He BJ | 21 | 21
(Japan) S Sato | 21 | 21
(Hong Kong) Cheung N Y | 8 | 18
(United States) BW Zhang | 17 | 8
3 | (India) P. V. Sindhu | 21 | 21

Second Round
(South Korea) Sung J-h | 12 | 19
7 | (China) He BJ | 21 | 21
(Japan) S Sato | 17 | 16
3 | (India) P. V. Sindhu | 21 | 21

Quarter-finals
7 | (China) He BJ | 21 | 21
3 | (India) P. V. Sindhu | 13 | 16

==== Section 4 ====
First Round
(Chinese Taipei) Lee C-h | 9 | 9
(Indonesia) G M Tunjung | 21 | 21
(Denmark) M Blichfeldt | 21 | 21
PFR | (Bulgaria) L Zetchiri | 7 | 5
(Thailand) P Chochuwong | 21 | 21 | 15
(China) Cai YY | 18 | 23 | 21
(Canada) M Li | 17 | 12
2 | (Japan) A Yamaguchi | 21 | 21

Second Round
(Indonesia) G M Tunjung | 13 | 21 | 21
(Denmark) M Blichfeldt | 21 | 14 | 11
(China) Cai YY | 14 | 14
2 | (Japan) A Yamaguchi | 21 | 21

Quarter-finals
(Indonesia) G M Tunjung | 15 | 6^{r}
2 | (Japan) A Yamaguchi | 21 | 11

== Men's doubles ==
=== Seeds ===
1. (Indonesia) Marcus Fernaldi Gideon / Kevin Sanjaya Sukamuljo (final)
2. (China) Li Junhui / Liu Yuchen (second round)
3. (China) Liu Cheng / Zhang Nan (second round)
4. (Japan) Takeshi Kamura / Keigo Sonoda (first round)
5. (Denmark) Kim Astrup / Anders Skaarup Rasmussen (first round)
6. (Denmark) Mads Conrad-Petersen / Mads Pieler Kolding (withdrew)
7. (Chinese Taipei) Chen Hung-ling / Wang Chi-lin (quarter-finals)
8. (Indonesia) Fajar Alfian / Muhammad Rian Ardianto (withdrew)

=== Finals ===
Semi-finals
1 | (Indonesia) Marcus Fernaldi Gideon (Indonesia) Kevin Sanjaya Sukamuljo | 21 | 26
(India) Satwiksairaj Rankireddy (India) Chirag Shetty | 12 | 24
(Chinese Taipei) Lee Jhe-huei (Chinese Taipei) Lee Yang | 21 | 18 | 17
(China) Han Chengkai (China) Zhou Haodong | 13 | 21 | 21

Final
1 | (Indonesia) Marcus Fernaldi Gideon (Indonesia) Kevin Sanjaya Sukamuljo | 21 | 21 | 17
(China) Han Chengkai (China) Zhou Haodong | 23 | 8 | 21

=== Top half ===
==== Section 1 ====
First Round
1 | (Indonesia) M F Gideon (Indonesia) K S Sukamuljo | 18 | 21 | 21
(Germany) M Lamsfuß (Germany) M Seidel | 21 | 12 | 14
(Japan) H Endo (Japan) Y Watanabe | 21 | 21
(Netherlands) J Arends (Netherlands) R Jille | 10 | 17
7 | (Chinese Taipei) Chen H-l (Chinese Taipei) Wang C-l | 21 | 21
(South Korea) Chung E-s (South Korea) Kim D-y | 15 | 10
(Netherlands) J Maas (Netherlands) R Tabeling | 14 | 13
(Indonesia) M Ahsan (Indonesia) H Setiawan | 21 | 21

Second Round
1 | (Indonesia) M F Gideon (Indonesia) K S Sukamuljo | 21 | 22
(Japan) H Endo (Japan) Y Watanabe | 14 | 20
7 | (Chinese Taipei) Chen H-l (Chinese Taipei) Wang C-l | 21 | 21
(Indonesia) M Ahsan (Indonesia) H Setiawan | 13 | 11

Quarter-finals
1 | (Indonesia) M F Gideon (Indonesia) K S Sukamuljo | 21 | 21
7 | (Chinese Taipei) Chen H-l (Chinese Taipei) Wang C-l | 17 | 11

==== Section 2 ====
First Round
3 | (China) Liu C (China) Zhang N | 21 | 21
(Denmark) M Boe (Denmark) C Mogensen | 11 | 15
(India) M Attri (India) B. S Reddy | 21 | 21
(South Korea) Kang M-h (South Korea) Kim W-h | 18 | 17
5 | (Denmark) K Astrup (Denmark) A S Rasmussen | 24 | 18 | 17
(China) He JT (China) Tan Q | 22 | 21 | 21
(Germany) J R Jansen (Germany) J Zurwonne | 13 | 15
(India) S Rankireddy (India) C Shetty | 21 | 21

Second Round
3 | (China) Liu C (China) Zhang N | 14 | 16
(India) M Attri (India) B. S Reddy | 21 | 21
(China) He JT (China) Tan Q | 13 | 19
(India) S Rankireddy (India) C Shetty | 21 | 21

Quarter-finals
(India) M Attri (India) B. S Reddy | 17 | 11
(India) S Rankireddy (India) C Shetty | 21 | 21

=== Bottom half ===
==== Section 3 ====
First Round
(Russia) V Ivanov (Russia) I Sozonov | 13 | 21 | 21
(Japan) T Inoue (Japan) Y Kaneko | 21 | 19 | 18
(Chinese Taipei) Lu C-y (Chinese Taipei) Yang P-h | 21 | 21
PFR | (Scotland) A Dunn (Scotland) A Hall | 11 | 13
(England) M Ellis (England) C Langridge | 16 | 13
(Thailand) B Isara (Thailand) M Jongjit | 21 | 21
(Chinese Taipei) Lee J-h (Chinese Taipei) Lee Y | 20 | 21 | 21
4 | (Japan) T Kamura (Japan) K Sonoda | 22 | 19 | 16

Second Round
(Russia) V Ivanov (Russia) I Sozonov | 19 | 21 | 21
(Chinese Taipei) Lu C-y (Chinese Taipei) Yang P-h | 21 | 16 | 10
(Thailand) B Isara (Thailand) M Jongjit | 17 | 16
(Chinese Taipei) Lee J-h (Chinese Taipei) Lee Y | 21 | 21

Quarter-finals
(Russia) V Ivanov (Russia) I Sozonov | 19 | 21 | 20
(Chinese Taipei) Lee J-h (Chinese Taipei) Lee Y | 21 | 17 | 22

==== Section 4 ====
First Round
(China) Han CK (China) Zhou HD | 21 | 21
(Japan) T Hoki (Japan) Y Kobayashi | 10 | 16
(Malaysia) A Chia (Malaysia) Soh W Y | 27 | 21
PFR | (United States) P Chew (United States) R Chew | 25 | 17
(Chinese Taipei) Liao M-c (Chinese Taipei) Su C-h | 16 | 21 | 21
(Malaysia) Ong Y S (Malaysia) Teo E Y | 21 | 17 | 16
(India) Arjun M. R. (India) R Shlok | 14 | 17
2 | (China) Li JH (China) Liu YC | 21 | 21

Second Round
(China) Han CK (China) Zhou HD | 21 | 21
(Malaysia) A Chia (Malaysia) Soh W Y | 19 | 16
(Chinese Taipei) Liao M-c (Chinese Taipei) Su C-h | 21 | 21
2 | (China) Li JH (China) Liu YC | 19 | 17

Quarter-finals
(China) Han CK (China) Zhou HD | 21 | 21
(Chinese Taipei) Liao M-c (Chinese Taipei) Su C-h | 17 | 18

== Women's doubles ==
=== Seeds ===
1. (Japan) Yuki Fukushima / Sayaka Hirota (second round)
2. (Japan) Misaki Matsutomo / Ayaka Takahashi (quarter-finals)
3. (China) Chen Qingchen / Jia Yifan (first round)
4. (Indonesia) Greysia Polii / Apriyani Rahayu (semi-finals)
5. (Japan) Mayu Matsumoto / Wakana Nagahara (champions)
6. (Japan) Shiho Tanaka / Koharu Yonemoto (second round)
7. (South Korea) Lee So-hee / Shin Seung-chan (semi-finals)
8. (Thailand) Jongkolphan Kititharakul / Rawinda Prajongjai (first round)

=== Finals ===
Semi-finals
5 | (Japan) Mayu Matsumoto (Japan) Wakana Nagahara | 21 | 21
4 | (Indonesia) Greysia Polii (Indonesia) Apriyani Rahayu | 10 | 8
7 | (South Korea) Lee So-hee (South Korea) Shin Seung-chan | 21 | 15 | 15
(Bulgaria) Gabriela Stoeva (Bulgaria) Stefani Stoeva | 15 | 21 | 21

Final
5 | (Japan) Mayu Matsumoto (Japan) Wakana Nagahara | 21 | 21
(Bulgaria) Gabriela Stoeva (Bulgaria) Stefani Stoeva | 14 | 19

=== Top half ===
==== Section 1 ====
First Round
1 | (Japan) Y Fukushima (Japan) S Hirota | 21 | 21
(China) Huang DP (China) Huang YQ | 11 | 12
(South Korea) Chang Y-n (South Korea) Jung K-e | 21 | 21
(Canada) R Honderich (Canada) K Tsai | 18 | 16
5 | (Japan) M Matsumoto (Japan) W Nagahara | 21 | 21
(France) É Lefel (France) A Tran | 11 | 11
(Turkey) B Erçetin (Turkey) N İnci | 21 | 21
(United States) A Lee (United States) S Lee | 2 | 7

Second Round
1 | (Japan) Y Fukushima (Japan) S Hirota | 12 | 21 | 17
(South Korea) Chang Y-n (South Korea) Jung K-e | 21 | 17 | 21
5 | (Japan) M Matsumoto (Japan) W Nagahara | 21 | 21
(Turkey) B Erçetin (Turkey) N İnci | 8 | 7

Quarter-finals
(South Korea) Chang Y-n (South Korea) Jung K-e | 13 | 21 | 17
5 | (Japan) M Matsumoto (Japan) W Nagahara | 21 | 14 | 21

==== Section 2 ====
First Round
4 | (Indonesia) G Polii (Indonesia) A Rahayu | w | / | o
(China) Du Y (China) Li YH
PFR | (Belgium) L Jaques (Belgium) F Vandenhoucke | 12 | 12
(India) M Jakkampudi (India) P S. Ram | 21 | 21
6 | (Japan) S Tanaka (Japan) K Yonemoto | 21 | 21
(Germany) L Efler (Germany) I Herttrich | 15 | 17
(Russia) A Chervyakova (Russia) O Morozova | 12 | 10
(Denmark) M Fruergaard (Denmark) S Thygesen | 21 | 21

Second Round
4 | (Indonesia) G Polii (Indonesia) A Rahayu | 21 | 21
(India) M Jakkampudi (India) P S. Ram | 15 | 13
6 | (Japan) S Tanaka (Japan) K Yonemoto | 19 | 19
(Denmark) M Fruergaard (Denmark) S Thygesen | 21 | 21

Quarter-finals
4 | (Indonesia) G Polii (Indonesia) A Rahayu | 18 | 21 | 21
(Denmark) M Fruergaard (Denmark) S Thygesen | 21 | 16 | 12

=== Bottom half ===
==== Section 3 ====
First Round
(Russia) E Bolotova (Russia) A Davletova | 14 | 21 | 21
(Germany) J Goliszewski (Germany) L Käpplein | 21 | 9 | 17
PFR | (Denmark) A Bøje (Denmark) S Lundgaard | 12 | 15
7 | (South Korea) Lee S-h (South Korea) Shin S-c | 21 | 21
(Chinese Taipei) Hsu Y-c (Chinese Taipei) Wu T-j | 22 | 21
(France) D Delrue (France) L Palermo | 20 | 14
(Japan) N Fukuman (Japan) K Yonao | 21 | 21
3 | (China) Chen QC (China) Jia YF | 18 | 15

Second Round
(Russia) E Bolotova (Russia) A Davletova | 16 | 15
7 | (South Korea) Lee S-h (South Korea) Shin S-c | 21 | 21
(Chinese Taipei) Hsu Y-c (Chinese Taipei) Wu T-j | 10 | 16
(Japan) N Fukuman (Japan) K Yonao | 21 | 21

Quarter-finals
7 | (South Korea) Lee S-h (South Korea) Shin S-c | 21 | 20 | 21
(Japan) N Fukuman (Japan) K Yonao | 13 | 22 | 14

==== Section 4 ====
First Round
(Bulgaria) G Stoeva (Bulgaria) S Stoeva | 21 | 21
(South Korea) Kim H-j (South Korea) Kong H-y | 13 | 18
(Indonesia) N K M Istarani (Indonesia) R A Pradipta | 21 | 18 | 21
8 | (Thailand) J Kititharakul (Thailand) R Prajongjai | 15 | 21 | 19
(England) C Birch (England) L Smith | 21 | 22
(China) Li WM (China) Zheng Y | 23 | 24
(Malaysia) Chow M K (Malaysia) Lee M Y | 15 | 14
2 | (Japan) M Matsutomo (Japan) A Takahashi | 21 | 21

Second Round
(Bulgaria) G Stoeva (Bulgaria) S Stoeva | 21 | 21
(Indonesia) N K M Istarani (Indonesia) R A Pradipta | 17 | 17
(China) Li WM (China) Zheng Y | 25 | 17 | 15
2 | (Japan) M Matsutomo (Japan) A Takahashi | 23 | 21 | 21

Quarter-finals
(Bulgaria) G Stoeva (Bulgaria) S Stoeva | 21 | 21
2 | (Japan) M Matsutomo (Japan) A Takahashi | 8 | 16

== Mixed doubles ==
=== Seeds ===
1. (China) Zheng Siwei / Huang Yaqiong (champions)
2. (China) Wang Yilyu / Huang Dongping (quarter-finals)
3. (Indonesia) Tontowi Ahmad / Liliyana Natsir (quarter-finals)
4. (Hong Kong) Tang Chun Man / Tse Ying Suet (second round)
5. (China) Zhang Nan / Li Yinhui (first round)
6. (Denmark) Mathias Christiansen / Christinna Pedersen (first round)
7. (Malaysia) Chan Peng Soon / Goh Liu Ying (first round)
8. (Malaysia) Goh Soon Huat / Shevon Jemie Lai (second round)

=== Finals ===
Semi-finals
1 | (China) Zheng Siwei (China) Huang Yaqiong | 21 | 21
(Japan) Yuta Watanabe (Japan) Arisa Higashino | 11 | 14
(South Korea) Seo Seung-jae (South Korea) Chae Yoo-jung | 21 | 21
(Thailand) Dechapol Puavaranukroh (Thailand) Sapsiree Taerattanachai | 14 | 9

Final
1 | (China) Zheng Siwei (China) Huang Yaqiong | 21 | 21
(South Korea) Seo Seung-jae (South Korea) Chae Yoo-jung | 19 | 14

=== Top half ===
==== Section 1 ====
First Round
1 | (China) Zheng SW (China) Huang YQ | 21 | 21
(India) R Kapoor (India) K Garg | 5 | 10
(England) C Adcock (England) G Adcock | 24 | 18 | 21
(India) S Rankireddy (India) A Ponnappa | 22 | 21 | 19
8 | (Malaysia) Goh S H (Malaysia) S J Lai | 11 | 21 | 21
(Germany) M Lamsfuß (Germany) I Herttrich | 21 | 12 | 6
(Indonesia) R K Suwardi (Indonesia) D Susanto | 18 | 18
(England) M Ellis (England) L Smith | 21 | 21

Second Round
1 | (China) Zheng SW (China) Huang YQ | 21 | 21
(England) C Adcock (England) G Adcock | 12 | 11
8 | (Malaysia) Goh S H (Malaysia) S J Lai | 19 | 24 | 19
(England) M Ellis (England) L Smith | 21 | 22 | 21

Quarter-finals
1 | (China) Zheng SW (China) Huang YQ | 21 | 21
(England) M Ellis (England) L Smith | 16 | 19

==== Section 2 ====
First Round
3 | (Indonesia) T Ahmad (Indonesia) L Natsir | 21 | 21
(Chinese Taipei) Lee Y (Chinese Taipei) Hsu Y-c | 14 | 17
(Republic of Ireland) S Magee (Republic of Ireland) C Magee | 12 | 16
(Chinese Taipei) Wang C-l (Chinese Taipei) Lee C-h | 21 | 21
7 | (Malaysia) Chan P S (Malaysia) Goh L Y | 21 | 18 | 18
(Netherlands) R Tabeling (Netherlands) C Seinen | 19 | 21 | 21
(Hong Kong) Lee C H (Hong Kong) Chau H W | 15 | 13
(Japan) Y Watanabe (Japan) A Higashino | 21 | 21

Second Round
3 | (Indonesia) T Ahmad (Indonesia) L Natsir | 23 | 21
(Chinese Taipei) Wang C-l (Chinese Taipei) Lee C-h | 21 | 19
(Netherlands) R Tabeling (Netherlands) C Seinen | 14 | 6
(Japan) Y Watanabe (Japan) A Higashino | 21 | 21

Quarter-finals
3 | (Indonesia) T Ahmad (Indonesia) L Natsir | 16 | 21 | 18
(Japan) Y Watanabe (Japan) A Higashino | 21 | 16 | 21

=== Bottom half ===
==== Section 3 ====
First Round
(China) He JT (China) Du Y | 21 | 24 | 1^{r}
(Germany) M Seidel (Germany) L Efler | 19 | 26 | 1
(Japan) T Hoki (Japan) W Nagahara | 19 | 21 | 21
5 | (China) Zhang N (China) Li YH | 21 | 19 | 14
(South Korea) Seo S-j (South Korea) Chae Y-j | 21 | 21
(France) R Labar (France) A Mittelheisser | 15 | 7
(Indonesia) H Faizal (Indonesia) G E Widjaja | 18 | 9
4 | (Hong Kong) Tang C M (Hong Kong) Tse Y S | 21 | 21

Second Round
(Germany) M Seidel (Germany) L Efler | 21 | 20 | 24
(Japan) T Hoki (Japan) W Nagahara | 11 | 22 | 26
(South Korea) Seo S-j (South Korea) Chae Y-j | 21 | 21
4 | (Hong Kong) Tang C M (Hong Kong) Tse Y S | 18 | 18

Quarter-finals
(Japan) T Hoki (Japan) W Nagahara | 14 | 11
(South Korea) Seo S-j (South Korea) Chae Y-j | 21 | 21

==== Section 4 ====
First Round
(China) Lu K (China) Chen L | 16 | 15
(Thailand) D Puavaranukroh (Thailand) S Taerattanachai | 21 | 21
PFR | (Denmark) J Fischer Nielsen (Denmark) A Bøje | 21 | 14 | 23
6 | (Denmark) M Christiansen (Denmark) C Pedersen | 18 | 21 | 21
(Indonesia) P Jordan (Indonesia) M D Oktavianti | 21 | 21
(Denmark) M Mikkelsen (Denmark) M Surrow | 16 | 13
(Denmark) N Nøhr (Denmark) S Thygesen | 11 | 8
2 | (China) Wang YL (China) Huang DP | 21 | 21

Second Round
(Thailand) D Puavaranukroh (Thailand) S Taerattanachai | 21 | 21
(Denmark) J Fischer Nielsen (Denmark) A Bøje | 10 | 15
(Indonesia) P Jordan (Indonesia) M D Oktavianti | 14 | 12
2 | (China) Wang YL (China) Huang DP | 21 | 21

Quarter-finals
(Thailand) D Puavaranukroh (Thailand) S Taerattanachai | 16 | 21 | 21
2 | (China) Wang YL (China) Huang DP | 21 | 18 | 15

| Preceded by 2018 Denmark Open | BWF World Tour; 2018 BWF season | Succeeded by 2018 Macau Open |
