= Mayu Matsumoto =

Japanese badminton player (born 1995)

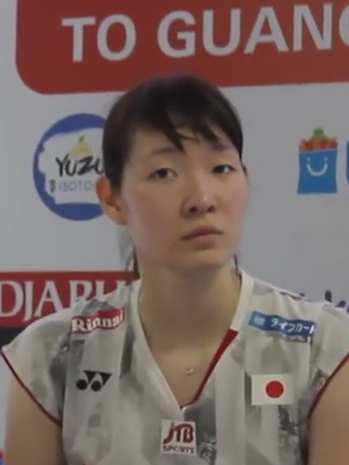
- Matsumoto in 2018

Personal information
- Born: 7 August 1995 (age 31) Sapporo, Hokkaido, Japan
- Height: 1.77 m (5 ft 10 in)
- Weight: 69 kg (152 lb)

Sport
- Country: Japan
- Sport: Badminton
- Handedness: Right
- Coached by: Kei Nakashima

Women's doubles
- Highest ranking: 1 (WD with Wakana Nagahara, 30 April 2019)
- Current ranking: 3 (WD with Yuki Fukushima, 6 October 2026)
- BWF profile
Medal record
Women's badminton
Representing Japan
World Championships
Gold medal – first place	2018 Nanjing	Women's doubles
Gold medal – first place	2019 Basel	Women's doubles
Bronze medal – third place	2021 Huelva	Women's doubles
Bronze medal – third place	2022 Tokyo	Women's doubles
Sudirman Cup
Silver medal – second place	2019 Nanning	Mixed team
Silver medal – second place	2021 Vantaa	Mixed team
Bronze medal – third place	2023 Suzhou	Mixed team
Uber Cup
Silver medal – second place	2020 Aarhus	Women's team
Bronze medal – third place	2022 Bangkok	Women's team
Bronze medal – third place	2026 Horsens	Women's team
Asian Games
Silver medal – second place	2026 Aichi–Nagoya	Women's team
Asian Championships
Silver medal – second place	2019 Wuhan	Women's doubles
Bronze medal – third place	2023 Dubai	Women's doubles
Bronze medal – third place	2026 Ningbo	Women's doubles
Asia Team Championships
Gold medal – first place	2020 Manila	Women's team
Asian Junior Championships
Bronze medal – third place	2013 Kota Kinabalu	Mixed team

Mayu Matsumoto (松本 麻佑, Matsumoto Mayu; born 7 August 1995) is a Japanese badminton player specializing in women's doubles. She achieved a career-high ranking of world No. 1 in women's doubles on 30 April 2019 alongside her long-time partner Wakana Nagahara. Matsumoto is a two-time World Champion, having won back-to-back gold medals in 2018 and 2019, as well as bronze medals in 2021 and 2022.

Throughout her eleven-year partnership with Nagahara (2013–2024), Matsumoto won multiple BWF World Tour titles, including the Super 1000 All England Open, the Super 750 French Open and India Open, and the Super 500 Singapore Open. The pair received the BWF Most Improved Player of the Year award in 2018. After Nagahara's retirement in September 2024, Matsumoto partnered with Yuki Fukushima, winning Super 1000 titles at the 2025 Malaysia Open and 2026 Indonesia Open, alongside consecutive French Open titles in 2025 and 2026.

Matsumoto represented Japan at two Summer Olympic Games, reaching the quarterfinals at the 2020 Tokyo Olympics and competing at the 2024 Paris Olympics. In team competitions, she helped Japan earn silver medals at the Sudirman Cup in 2019 and 2021, a silver medal at the 2020 Uber Cup, a gold medal at the 2020 Asia Team Championships, and a silver medal at the 2026 Asian Games.

== Career ==
=== 2013–2016 ===
In 2013, Matsumoto was selected to join the national junior team compete in the Asian Junior Championships. Played in three categories women's singles, doubles, and mixed doubles, she unable to win a single medal in the individual event. She won a bronze medal after Japanese team finished in the semi-finals. In 2014, she captured two title, winning the women's doubles title in the Smiling Fish International with Wakana Nagahara, and the women's singles title in the Indonesia International. She and Nagahara also reached the finals in a Grand Prix event, Russian Open. In 2015, she finished runner-up in the women's singles in the Russian Open, losing to Czechia Kristína Gavnholt.

In 2016, Matsumoto and Nagahara reached two finals in the Grand Prix event, the U.S. and Thailand Opens. She claimed her first ever Grand Prix title in the 2017 Canada Open, winning the women's doubles with Nagahara. They then matched their previous year's achievement in the U.S. Open by becoming runners-up.

=== 2018–2019: Back-to-back World Championship titles and World No. 1 ranking ===
In 2018, Matsumoto focused on women’s doubles with Wakana Nagahara. The pair won the gold medal at the 2018 World Championships in Nanjing, defeating Yuki Fukushima and Sayaka Hirota in the final. They also claimed titles at the Spain Masters and French Open, while finishing as runners-up at Indonesia Open, China Open, and Fuzhou China Open. Their ranking improved from 14 to 3, and they were named the BWF Most Improved Player of the Year.

In 2019, the pair reached the semifinals of the Malaysia Masters, Indonesia Masters, and German Open. They won the Singapore Open and finished as runners-up at the All England Open, Japan Open, Asian Championships, and World Tour Finals, losing three of those finals to Chen Qingchen and Jia Yifan. Matsumoto contributed to Japan’s silver medal at the Sudirman Cup. She and Nagahara successfully defended their World Championships title in Basel, defeating Yuki Fukushima and Sayaka Hirota in a close final, and reached a career-high ranking of world No. 1 on 30 April.

=== 2021–2023: Olympic debut ===
In March 2021, Matsumoto and Nagahara won their first Super 1000 title at the All England Open, defeating top-seeded Fukushima and Hirota in the final. Seeded third at the 2020 Summer Olympics in Tokyo, the pair reached the quarterfinals before being eliminated by South Korea's Kim So-yeong and Kong Hee-yong. Later that year, Matsumoto helped Japan secure silver medals at both the Sudirman Cup in Vantaa and the Uber Cup in Aarhus, before earning a bronze medal at the World Championships in Huelva.

During the 2022 season, Matsumoto and Nagahara reached finals at the Super 500 Thailand Open, finishing as runners-up to compatriots Nami Matsuyama and Chiharu Shida. She contributed to Japan’s bronze medal at the Uber Cup in Bangkok.They earned a bronze medal at the World Championships in Tokyo, where they lost in the semifinals to Chen and Jia. Later in the season, they reached the final of the Super 750 French Open, finishing as runners-up to Pearly Tan and Thinaah Muralitharan.

In 2023, the pair claimed a bronze medal at the Asian Championships in Dubai after a semifinal loss to Baek Ha-na and Lee So-hee. The pair contributed to Japan’s bronze medal at the Sudirman Cup in Suzhou. They reached the final of the Super 500 Canada Open, finishing as runners-up to Matsuyama and Shida. The duo advanced to the semifinals of the Korea Open and Malaysia Masters. They withdrew from the World Tour Finals after Nagahara was injured during their second group match.

=== 2024–2025: New partnership with Fukushima ===
Matsumoto and Nagahara opened 2024 by winning the Super 750 India Open, defeating Zhang Shuxian and Zheng Yu to secure their first World Tour title since 2021. After reaching the semifinals at the French Open and the Indonesia Open, they competed at the 2024 Summer Olympics in Paris, where they were eliminated in the group stage. In September 2024, after 11 years as a pair, Matsumoto and Nagahara dissolved their partnership following the Japan Open, with Nagahara retiring and Matsumoto continuing her career.

Matsumoto subsequently formed a new partnership with Yuki Fukushima. The pair reached the final of the Japan Masters, finishing as runners-up to Liu Shengshu and Tan Ning, and advanced to the semifinals of the China Masters. In early 2025, they captured their first title together at the Super 1000 Malaysia Open, defeating Jia Yifan and Zhang Shuxian in the final. They added a second title at the French Open, defeating Li Yijing and Luo Xumin. The pair also finished as runners-up at the All England Open and the World Tour Finals.

=== 2026 ===
In 2026, Matsumoto and Fukushima reached the final of the Super 750 India Open in January, finishing as runners-up to Liu Shengshu and Tan Ning of China. The pair advanced to the semifinals of the Malaysia Open and the quarterfinals of the All England Open. At the Asian Championships in Ningbo, they earned a bronze medal in women’s doubles after a semifinal loss to Li Yijing and Luo Xumin. Matsumoto was part of the Japanese team that took bronze at the Uber Cup in Horsens, where Japan reached the semifinals before falling to China.

In June, the duo won the Super 1000 Indonesia Open, defeating Liu and Tan in the final. They later reached the semifinals of the Japan Open and the final of the Super 1000 China Open, again finishing as runners-up to Liu and Tan. The pair exited in the third round of the World Championships.

Matsumoto contributed to Japan’s silver medal in the women's team event at the Asian Games in Aichi–Nagoya, with the team losing the final to China. In October, Fukushima and Matsumoto retained their French Open title, defeating Pearly Tan and Thinaah Muralitharan in the final for their second World Tour title of the season.

== Awards and nominations ==
Award	Year	Category	Result	Ref.
BWF Awards	2018	Most Improved Player of the Year with Wakana Nagahara	Won	

== Achievements ==
=== World Championships ===
Women's doubles
Year	Venue	Partner	Opponent	Score	Result	Ref.
2018	Nanjing Youth Olympic Sports Park, Nanjing, China	(Japan) Wakana Nagahara	(Japan) Yuki Fukushima (Japan) Sayaka Hirota	19–21, 21–19, 22–20	Gold	
2019	St. Jakobshalle, Basel, Switzerland	(Japan) Wakana Nagahara	(Japan) Yuki Fukushima (Japan) Sayaka Hirota	21–11, 20–22, 23–21	Gold	
2021	Palacio de los Deportes Carolina Marín, Huelva, Spain	(Japan) Wakana Nagahara	(China) Chen Qingchen (China) Jia Yifan	15–21, 12–21	Bronze	
2022	Tokyo Metropolitan Gymnasium, Tokyo, Japan	(Japan) Wakana Nagahara	(China) Chen Qingchen (China) Jia Yifan	13–21, 14–21	Bronze	

=== Asian Championships ===
Women's doubles
Year	Venue	Partner	Opponent	Score	Result	Ref.
2019	Wuhan Sports Center Gymnasium, Wuhan, China	(Japan) Wakana Nagahara	(China) Chen Qingchen (China) Jia Yifan	21–19, 14–21, 19–21	Silver	
2023	Sheikh Rashid Bin Hamdan Indoor Hall, Dubai, United Arab Emirates	(Japan) Wakana Nagahara	(South Korea) Baek Ha-na (South Korea) Lee So-hee	21–16, 8–21, 13–21	Bronze	
2026	Ningbo Olympic Sports Center Gymnasium, Ningbo, China	(Japan) Yuki Fukushima	(China) Li Yijing (China) Luo Xumin	17–21, 17–21	Bronze	

=== BWF World Tour (9 titles, 15 runners-up) ===
The BWF World Tour, which was announced on 19 March 2017 and implemented in 2018, is a series of elite badminton tournaments sanctioned by the Badminton World Federation (BWF). The BWF World Tour is divided into levels of World Tour Finals, Super 1000, Super 750, Super 500, Super 300 (part of the HSBC World Tour), and the BWF Tour Super 100.

Women's doubles
Year	Tournament	Level	Partner	Opponent	Score	Result	Ref.
2018	Indonesia Open	Super 1000	(Japan) Wakana Nagahara	(Japan) Yuki Fukushima (Japan) Sayaka Hirota	14–21, 21–16, 14–21	(silver) Runner-up	
2018	Spain Masters	Super 300	(Japan) Wakana Nagahara	(Japan) Ayako Sakuramoto (Japan) Yukiko Takahata	21–17, 21–13	(gold) Winner	
2018	China Open	Super 1000	(Japan) Wakana Nagahara	(Japan) Misaki Matsutomo (Japan) Ayaka Takahashi	16–21, 12–21	(silver) Runner-up	
2018	French Open	Super 750	(Japan) Wakana Nagahara	(Bulgaria) Gabriela Stoeva (Bulgaria) Stefani Stoeva	21–14, 21–19	(gold) Winner	
2018	Fuzhou China Open	Super 750	(Japan) Wakana Nagahara	(South Korea) Lee So-hee (South Korea) Shin Seung-chan	21–23, 18–21	(silver) Runner-up	
2019	All England Open	Super 1000	(Japan) Wakana Nagahara	(China) Chen Qingchen (China) Jia Yifan	21–18, 20–22, 11–21	(silver) Runner-up	
2019	Singapore Open	Super 500	(Japan) Wakana Nagahara	(South Korea) Kim Hye-jeong (South Korea) Kong Hee-yong	21–17, 22–20	(gold) Winner	
2019	Japan Open	Super 750	(Japan) Wakana Nagahara	(South Korea) Kim So-yeong (South Korea) Kong Hee-yong	12–21, 12–21	(silver) Runner-up	
2019	BWF World Tour Finals	World Tour Finals	(Japan) Wakana Nagahara	(China) Chen Qingchen (China) Jia Yifan	14–21, 10–21	(silver) Runner-up	
2020	Denmark Open	Super 750	(Japan) Wakana Nagahara	(Japan) Yuki Fukushima (Japan) Sayaka Hirota	10–21, 21–16, 18–21	(silver) Runner-up	
2021	All England Open	Super 1000	(Japan) Wakana Nagahara	(Japan) Yuki Fukushima (Japan) Sayaka Hirota	21–18, 21–16	(gold) Winner	
2022	Thailand Open	Super 500	(Japan) Wakana Nagahara	(Japan) Nami Matsuyama (Japan) Chiharu Shida	21–17, 15–21, 24–26	(silver) Runner-up	
2022	French Open	Super 750	(Japan) Wakana Nagahara	(Malaysia) Pearly Tan (Malaysia) Thinaah Muralitharan	19–21, 21–18, 15–21	(silver) Runner-up	
2023	Canada Open	Super 500	(Japan) Wakana Nagahara	(Japan) Nami Matsuyama (Japan) Chiharu Shida	20–22, 16–21	(silver) Runner-up	
2024	India Open	Super 750	(Japan) Wakana Nagahara	(China) Zhang Shuxian (China) Zheng Yu	21–12, 21–13	(gold) Winner	
2024	Japan Masters	Super 500	(Japan) Yuki Fukushima	(China) Liu Shengshu (China) Tan Ning	15–21, 5–21	(silver) Runner-up	
2025	Malaysia Open	Super 1000	(Japan) Yuki Fukushima	(China) Jia Yifan (China) Zhang Shuxian	17–21, 21–15, 21–15	(gold) Winner	
2025	All England Open	Super 1000	(Japan) Yuki Fukushima	(Japan) Nami Matsuyama (Japan) Chiharu Shida	16–21, 21–14, 17–21	(silver) Runner-up	
2025	French Open	Super 750	(Japan) Yuki Fukushima	(China) Li Yijing (China) Luo Xumin	17–21, 21–18, 21–15	(gold) Winner	
2025	BWF World Tour Finals	World Tour Finals	(Japan) Yuki Fukushima	(South Korea) Baek Ha-na (South Korea) Lee So-hee	17–21, 11–21	(silver) Runner-up	
2026	India Open	Super 750	(Japan) Yuki Fukushima	(China) Liu Shengshu (China) Tan Ning	11–21, 18–21	(silver) Runner-up	
2026	Indonesia Open	Super 1000	(Japan) Yuki Fukushima	(China) Liu Shengshu (China) Tan Ning	21–15, 18–21, 21–18	(gold) Winner	
2026	China Open	Super 1000	(Japan) Yuki Fukushima	(China) Liu Shengshu (China) Tan Ning	14–21, 19–21	(silver) Runner-up	
2026	French Open	Super 750	(Japan) Yuki Fukushima	(Malaysia) Pearly Tan (Malaysia) Thinaah Muralitharan	10–21, 21–17, 21–16	(gold) Winner	

=== BWF Grand Prix (1 title, 5 runners-up) ===
The BWF Grand Prix had two levels, the Grand Prix and Grand Prix Gold. It was a series of badminton tournaments sanctioned by the Badminton World Federation (BWF) and played between 2007 and 2017.

Women's singles
Year	Tournament	Opponent	Score	Result	Ref.
2015	Russian Open	(Czech Republic) Kristína Gavnholt	10–21, 20–22	(silver) Runner-up	

Women's doubles
Year	Tournament	Partner	Opponent	Score	Result	Ref.
2014	Russian Open	(Japan) Wakana Nagahara	(Japan) Yuriko Miki (Japan) Koharu Yonemoto	17–21, 7–21	(silver) Runner-up	
2016	U.S. Open	(Japan) Wakana Nagahara	(Japan) Shiho Tanaka (Japan) Koharu Yonemoto	22–20, 15–21, 19–21	(silver) Runner-up	
2016	Thailand Open	(Japan) Wakana Nagahara	(Thailand) Puttita Supajirakul (Thailand) Sapsiree Taerattanachai	12–21, 17–21	(silver) Runner-up	
2017	Canada Open	(Japan) Wakana Nagahara	(Japan) Chisato Hoshi (Japan) Naru Shinoya	21–16, 16–21, 21–18	(gold) Winner	
2017	U.S. Open	(Japan) Wakana Nagahara	(South Korea) Lee So-hee (South Korea) Shin Seung-chan	16–21, 13–21	(silver) Runner-up	

BWF Grand Prix Gold tournament
BWF Grand Prix tournament

=== BWF International Challenge/Series (2 titles) ===
Women's singles
Year	Tournament	Opponent	Score	Result	Ref.
2014	Indonesia International	(Indonesia) Hera Desi	11–10, 10–11, 11–6, 10–11, 11–9	(gold) Winner	

Women's doubles
Year	Tournament	Partner	Opponent	Score	Result	Ref.
2014	Smiling Fish International	(Japan) Wakana Nagahara	(Thailand) Pacharapun Chochuwong (Thailand) Chanisa Teachavorasinskun	21–17, 21–11	(gold) Winner	

BWF International Challenge tournament
BWF International Series tournament

== Performance timeline ==
Key

W	Won	F	Finalist	SF	Semi-finalist
QF	Quarter-finalist	#R	Rounds 4, 3, 2, 1	RR	Round-robin stage
Q#	Qualification round	A	Absent	w/d	Withdrew
G	Gold	S	Silver	B	Bronze
NH	Not held	N/A	Not applicable	DNQ	Did not qualify

=== National team ===
- Junior level

Team events	2013
Asian Junior Championships	B

- Senior level

Team events	2019	2020	2021	2022	2023	2024	2025	2026	Ref.
Asia Team Championships	NH	G	NH	A	NH	A	NH	A	
Asian Games	NH			A	NH			S	
Uber Cup	NH	S	NH	B	NH	A	NH	B	
Sudirman Cup	S	NH	S	NH	B	NH	A	NH	

=== Individual competitions ===
==== Senior level ====
===== Women's doubles =====
Event	2018	2019	2020	2021	2022	2023	2024	2025	2026	Ref
Asian Championships	A	S	NH		A	B	QF	2R	B	
Asian Games	DNQ	NH			DNQ	NH			2R	
World Championships	G	G	NH	B	B	3R	NH	3R	3R	
Olympic Games	NH		QF	NH			RR	NH		

Tournament	BWF Superseries / Grand Prix				BWF World Tour									Best	Ref
Tournament	2014	2015	2016	2017	2018	2019	2020	2021	2022	2023	2024	2025	2026	Best	Ref
Malaysia Open	A				QF	QF	NH		SF	A	2R	W	SF	W ('25)	
India Open	A						NH		A		W	QF	F	W ('24)	
Indonesia Masters	A			NH	A	SF	2R	2R	A	w/d	w/d	QF	A	SF ('19)	
German Open	A				2R	SF	NH		w/d	QF	A			SF ('19)	
All England Open	A				SF	F	QF	W	w/d	QF	1R	F	QF	W ('21)	
Orléans Masters	A						NH	A				SF	A	SF ('25)	
Thailand Open	NH	A	F	A	QF	QF	w/d	NH	F	A				F ('16, '22)	
Thailand Open	NH	A	F	A	QF	QF	w/d	NH	F	A				F ('16, '22)	
Malaysia Masters	A		1R	A		SF	w/d	NH	2R	SF	A			SF ('19, '23)	
Singapore Open	A					W	NH		A	QF	QF	2R	QF	W ('19)	
Indonesia Open	A				F	QF	NH	QF	1R	SF	SF	QF	W	W ('26)	
Australian Open	A					QF	NH		QF	QF	A			QF ('19, '22, '23)	
U.S. Open	A	1R	F	F	A		NH			A				F ('16, '17)	
Canada Open	A	QF	A	W	A		NH		A	F	A			W ('17)	
Japan Open	A	1R	1R	1R	QF	F	NH		QF	SF	1R	1R	SF	F ('19)	
China Open	A				F	2R	NH			QF	A	QF	F	F ('18, '26)	
Chinese Taipei Open	2R	1R	A	SF	A		NH		A					SF ('17)	
Korea Masters	A		QF	A			NH		A					QF ('16)	
China Masters	A		2R	1R	F	SF	NH			QF	SF	QF	w/d	F ('18)	
Denmark Open	A				1R	SF	F	A	1R	SF	A	SF	2R	F ('20)	
French Open	A			SF	W	SF	NH	A	F	SF	SF	W	W	W ('18, '25,'26)	
Korea Open	A			QF	QF	2R	NH		A	SF	A	SF	w/d	SF ('23, '25)	
Japan Masters	NH									SF	F	SF	2R	F ('24)	
Hong Kong Open	A			QF	1R	SF	NH			QF	A		Q	SF ('19)	
Superseries / World Tour Finals	DNQ				SF	F	DNQ			w/d	DNQ	F	Q	F ('19, '25)	
Macau Open	A			QF	A		NH				A			QF ('17)	
Spain Masters	NH				W	A			NH	A		NH		W ('18)	
New Zealand Open	A		2R	2R	A	QF	NH							QF ('19)	
Russian Open	F	w/d	A				NH							F ('14)	
Year-end ranking	101	94	32	14	3	3	3	5	8	9	93	5		3	
Tournament	2014	2015	2016	2017	2018	2019	2020	2021	2022	2023	2024	2025	2026	Best	Ref

===== Mixed doubles =====
Tournament	SS / GP		BWF World Tour	Best
Tournament	2016	2017	2018	Best
German Open	A		1R	1R ('18)
Malaysia Open	A		1R	1R ('18)
Korea Masters	1R	A		1R ('16)
Thailand Open	A		QF	QF ('18)
Year-end ranking	521	N/A	160	160
Tournament	2016	2017	2018	Best
