= Spain Masters =

Annual badminton tournament in Spain

- Official website
- Founded: 2018; 8 years ago
- Editions: 6 (2024)
- Location: Madrid (2024); Spain
- Venue: Centro Deportivo Municipal Gallur (2024)
- Prize money: US$210,000 (2024)

Men's
- Draw: 32S / 32D
- Current champions: Loh Kean Yew (singles); Sabar Karyaman Gutama; Muhammad Reza Pahlevi Isfahani (doubles)
- Most singles titles: 2 Viktor Axelsen
- Most doubles titles: 1, all winners

Women's
- Draw: 32S / 32D
- Current champions: Ratchanok Intanon (singles); Rin Iwanaga; Kie Nakanishi (doubles)
- Most singles titles: 1, all winners
- Most doubles titles: 1, all winners

Mixed doubles
- Draw: 32
- Current champions: Rinov Rivaldy; Pitha Haningtyas Mentari
- Most titles (male): 2 Rinov Rivaldy
- Most titles (female): 2 Pitha Haningtyas Mentari

Super 300
- Canada Open; German Open; Korea Masters; Macau Open; New Zealand Open; Orléans Masters; Spain Masters; Swiss Open; Syed Modi International; Taipei Open; Thailand Masters; U.S. Open

Last completed
- 2024 Spain Masters

The Spain Masters (Spanish: Maestros de España) is an annual badminton tournament held in Spain. This tournament is part of the BWF World Tour tournaments and is leveled in BWF World Tour Super 300.

== Venue & host city ==
- 2018–2020: Pavelló de la Vall d'Hebron, Barcelona.
- 2021: Palacio de los Deportes Carolina Marín, Huelva.
- 2023–2024: Centro Deportivo Municipal Gallur, Madrid.

== Past winners ==
Year	Men's singles	Women's singles	Men's doubles	Women's doubles	Mixed doubles
2018	(Denmark) Rasmus Gemke	(Japan) Minatsu Mitani	(South Korea) Kim Gi-jung (South Korea) Lee Yong-dae	(Japan) Mayu Matsumoto (Japan) Wakana Nagahara	(Denmark) Niclas Nøhr (Denmark) Sara Thygesen
2019	(Denmark) Viktor Axelsen	(Denmark) Mia Blichfeldt	(Chinese Taipei) Lee Yang (Chinese Taipei) Wang Chi-lin	(South Korea) Kim So-yeong (South Korea) Kong Hee-yong	(South Korea) Seo Seung-jae (South Korea) Chae Yoo-jung
2020	(Denmark) Viktor Axelsen	(Thailand) Pornpawee Chochuwong	(Denmark) Kim Astrup (Denmark) Anders Skaarup Rasmussen	(Indonesia) Greysia Polii (Indonesia) Apriyani Rahayu	(South Korea) Kim Sa-rang (South Korea) Kim Ha-na
2021	(France) Toma Junior Popov	(Indonesia) Putri Kusuma Wardani	(Indonesia) Pramudya Kusumawardana (Indonesia) Yeremia Rambitan	(Indonesia) Yulfira Barkah (Indonesia) Febby Valencia Dwijayanti Gani	(Indonesia) Rinov Rivaldy (Indonesia) Pitha Haningtyas Mentari
2022	Cancelled (Note: This tournament, originally to be played from 1 to 6 March, was later cancelled due to the COVID-19 pandemic in Spain.)				
2023	(Japan) Kenta Nishimoto	(Indonesia) Gregoria Mariska Tunjung	(China) He Jiting (China) Zhou Haodong	(China) Liu Shengshu (China) Tan Ning	(Denmark) Mathias Christiansen (Denmark) Alexandra Bøje
2024	(Singapore) Loh Kean Yew	(Thailand) Ratchanok Intanon	(Indonesia) Sabar Karyaman Gutama (Indonesia) Muhammad Reza Pahlevi Isfahani	(Japan) Rin Iwanaga (Japan) Kie Nakanishi	(Indonesia) Rinov Rivaldy (Indonesia) Pitha Haningtyas Mentari
2025	Cancelled (Note: This tournament, originally to be played from 25 to 30 March, was later cancelled.)				

== Performances by nation ==
As of the 2024 edition

Pos	Nation	MS	WS	MD	WD	XD	Total
1	Indonesia		2	2	2	2	8
2	Denmark	3	1	1		2	7
3	Japan	1	1		2		4
3	South Korea			1	1	2	4
5	China			1	1		2
5	Thailand		2				2
7	Chinese Taipei			1			1
7	France	1					1
7	Singapore	1					1
Total		6	6	6	6	6	30
