= 2019 Japan Open =

2019 badminton tournament in Tokyo

Tournament details
- Dates: 23–28 July
- Level: Super 750
- Total prize money: US$750,000
- Venue: Musashino Forest Sport Plaza
- Location: Tokyo, Japan

Champions
- Men's singles: (Japan) Kento Momota
- Women's singles: (Japan) Akane Yamaguchi
- Men's doubles: (Indonesia) Marcus Fernaldi Gideon (Indonesia) Kevin Sanjaya Sukamuljo
- Women's doubles: (South Korea) Kim So-yeong (South Korea) Kong Hee-yong
- Mixed doubles: (China) Wang Yilyu (China) Huang Dongping

The 2019 Japan Open (officially known as the Daihatsu Yonex Japan Open 2019 for sponsorship reasons) was a BWF World Tour 750 event which took place at Musashino Forest Sport Plaza in Tokyo, Japan, from 23 to 28 July 2019. It had a total purse of $750,000.

== Tournament ==
The 2019 Japan Open was the fifteenth tournament of the 2019 BWF World Tour and also part of the Japan Open championships, which has been held since 1982. This tournament was organized by Nippon Badminton Association with the sanction of the BWF.

=== Venue ===
This international tournament was held at Musashino Forest Sport Plaza in Tokyo, Japan.

=== Point distribution ===
Below is the point distribution table for each phase of the tournament based on the BWF points system for the BWF World Tour Super 750 event.

Winner	Runner-up	3/4	5/8	9/16	17/32
11,000	9,350	7,700	6,050	4,320	2,660

=== Prize money ===
The total prize money for this tournament was US$750,000. Distribution of prize money was in accordance with BWF regulations.

Event	Winner	Finals	Semi-finals	Quarter-finals	Last 16	Last 32
Singles	$52,500	$25,500	$10,500	$4,125	$2,250	$750
Doubles	$55,500	$26,250	$10,500	$4,687.50	$2,437.50	$750

== Men's singles ==
=== Seeds ===
1. (Japan) Kento Momota (champion)
2. (China) Shi Yuqi (withdrew)
3. (Denmark) Viktor Axelsen (withdrew)
4. (Chinese Taipei) Chou Tien-chen (second round)
5. (China) Chen Long (first round)
6. (Indonesia) Jonatan Christie (final)
7. (Indonesia) Anthony Sinisuka Ginting (quarter-finals)
8. (India) Srikanth Kidambi (first round)

=== Finals ===
Semi-finals
1	(Japan) Kento Momota	21	21
(India) B. Sai Praneeth	18	12
(Denmark) Jan Ø. Jørgensen	14	14
6	(Indonesia) Jonatan Christie	21	21

Final
1	(Japan) Kento Momota	21	21
6	(Indonesia) Jonatan Christie	16	13

=== Top half ===
==== Section 1 ====
First Round
1	(Japan) K Momota	21	22
(Denmark) H-K Vittinghus	17	20
(Thailand) K Wangcharoen	16	21	21
(Netherlands) M Caljouw	21	11	11
7	(Indonesia) A S Ginting	22	21
(China) Lu GZ	20	16
(Thailand) S Thammasin	22	21
(Malaysia) Liew D	20	10

Second Round
1	(Japan) K Momota	21	21
(Thailand) K Wangcharoen	12	13
7	(Indonesia) A S Ginting	20	21	21
(Thailand) S Thammasin	22	17	6

Quarter-finals
1	(Japan) K Momota	21	20	21
7	(Indonesia) A S Ginting	13	22	15

==== Section 2 ====
First Round
PFR	(Hong Kong) Wong W K	21	21
(China) Huang YX	9	18
(Indonesia) T Sugiarto	26	21
(France) B Leverdez	24	6
5	(China) Chen L	14	17
(Japan) K Tsuneyama	21	21
(India) B. Sai Praneeth	21	21
(Japan) K Nishimoto	17	13

Second Round
PFR	(Hong Kong) Wong W K	16	17
(Indonesia) T Sugiarto	21	21
(Japan) K Tsuneyama	13	16
(India) B. Sai Praneeth	21	21

Quarter-finals
(Indonesia) T Sugiarto	12	15
(India) B. Sai Praneeth	21	21

=== Bottom half ===
==== Section 3 ====
First Round
(Chinese Taipei) Wang T-w	21	14	20
(Denmark) R Gemke	19	21	22
(India) Prannoy K	13	21	22
8	(India) S Kidambi	21	11	20
(China) Lin D	21	11	21
(Denmark) J Ø. Jørgensen	16	21	23
(South Korea) Lee D-k	17	12
4	(Chinese Taipei) Chou T-c	21	21

Second Round
(Denmark) R Gemke	21	21
(India) Prannoy K	9	15
(Denmark) J Ø. Jørgensen	21	11	21
4	(Chinese Taipei) Chou T-c	19	21	19

Quarter-finals
(Denmark) R Gemke	21	14	13
(Denmark) J Ø. Jørgensen	11	21	21

==== Section 4 ====
First Round
(Thailand) K Phetpradab	10	15
(Hong Kong) Ng K L	21	21
(Thailand) S Avihingsanon	15	21
6	(Indonesia) J Christie	21	23
(Denmark) A Antonsen	21	21
(India) S Verma	17	12
(Malaysia) Lee Z J	19	21	19
PFR	(Hong Kong) Lee C Y	21	15	21

Second Round
(Hong Kong) Ng K L	16	15
6	(Indonesia) J Christie	21	21
(Denmark) A Antonsen	13	21	21
PFR	(Hong Kong) Lee C Y	21	15	16

Quarter-finals
6	(Indonesia) J Christie	21	21
(Denmark) A Antonsen	12	14

== Women's singles ==
=== Seeds ===
1. (Chinese Taipei) Tai Tzu-ying (quarter-finals)
2. (China) Chen Yufei (semi-finals)
3. (Japan) Nozomi Okuhara (final)
4. (Japan) Akane Yamaguchi (champion)
5. (India) P. V. Sindhu (quarter-finals)
6. (China) He Bingjiao (second round)
7. (Thailand) Ratchanok Intanon (first round)
8. (India) Saina Nehwal (withdrew)

=== Finals ===
Semi-finals
(Canada) Michelle Li	12	18
3	(Japan) Nozomi Okuhara	21	21
4	(Japan) Akane Yamaguchi	21	21
2	(China) Chen Yufei	15	15

Final
3	(Japan) Nozomi Okuhara	13	15
4	(Japan) Akane Yamaguchi	21	21

=== Top half ===
==== Section 1 ====
First Round
1	(Chinese Taipei) Tai T-y	21	21
(United States) Zhang BW	17	19
(Indonesia) G M Tunjung	21	21
(Denmark) L Kjærsfeldt	15	17
7	(Thailand) R Intanon	15	13
(South Korea) Kim G-e	21	21
(Canada) M Li	21	21
(Hong Kong) Cheung N Y	11	14

Second Round
1	(Chinese Taipei) Tai T-y	21	21
(Indonesia) G M Tunjung	18	15
(South Korea) Kim G-e	12	21	13
(Canada) M Li	21	17	21

Quarter-finals
1	(Chinese Taipei) Tai T-y	15	21	20
(Canada) M Li	21	15	22

==== Section 2 ====
First Round
3	(Japan) N Okuhara	21	21
(Japan) S Kawakami	9	17
(Denmark) M Blichfeldt	21	6	21
(Japan) S Takahashi	18	21	13
6	(China) He BJ	21	21
(China) Cai YY	11	15
(Thailand) N Jindapol	21	21
(Hong Kong) Deng X	7	16

Second Round
3	(Japan) N Okuhara	21	21
(Denmark) M Blichfeldt	11	12
6	(China) He BJ	11	17
(Thailand) N Jindapol	21	21

Quarter-finals
3	(Japan) N Okuhara	16	21	21
(Thailand) N Jindapol	21	16	19

=== Bottom half ===
==== Section 3 ====
First Round
(Scotland) K Gilmour	18	19
(Japan) A Ohori	21	21
(China) Han Y	9	17
5	(India) P. V. Sindhu	21	21
(China) Chen XX	21	21
(Singapore) Yeo J M	12	11
PFR	(Russia) E Kosetskaya	9	9
4	(Japan) A Yamaguchi	21	21

Second Round
(Japan) A Ohori	21	10	13
5	(India) P. V. Sindhu	11	21	21
(China) Chen XX	15	14
4	(Japan) A Yamaguchi	21	21

Quarter-finals
5	(India) P. V. Sindhu	18	15
4	(Japan) A Yamaguchi	21	21

==== Section 4 ====
First Round
(Thailand) P Chochuwong	21	19	12
(South Korea) Sung J-h	16	21	21
(Thailand) B Ongbamrungphan	21	21
PFR	(Hong Kong) Yip P Y	12	18
(China) Li XR	18	21	17
(Malaysia) S Cheah S Y	21	19	21
(Indonesia) Fitriani	5	19
2	(China) Chen YF	21	21

Second Round
(South Korea) Sung J-h	16	14
(Thailand) B Ongbamrungphan	21	21
(Malaysia) S Cheah S Y	7	16
2	(China) Chen YF	21	21

Quarter-finals
(Thailand) B Ongbamrungphan	18	21	12
2	(China) Chen YF	21	15	21

== Men's doubles ==
=== Seeds ===
1. (Indonesia) Marcus Fernaldi Gideon / Kevin Sanjaya Sukamuljo (champions)
2. (Japan) Takeshi Kamura / Keigo Sonoda (semi-finals)
3. (China) Li Junhui / Liu Yuchen (semi-finals)
4. (Indonesia) Mohammad Ahsan / Hendra Setiawan (final)
5. (Japan) Hiroyuki Endo / Yuta Watanabe (quarter-finals)
6. (Indonesia) Fajar Alfian / Muhammad Rian Ardianto (second round)
7. (China) Han Chengkai / Zhou Haodong (second round)
8. (Denmark) Kim Astrup / Anders Skaarup Rasmussen (withdrew)

=== Finals ===
Semi-finals
1	(Indonesia) Marcus Fernaldi Gideon (Indonesia) Kevin Sanjaya Sukamuljo	16	21	21
3	(China) Li Junhui (China) Liu Yuchen	21	11	18
4	(Indonesia) Mohammad Ahsan (Indonesia) Hendra Setiawan	22	21
2	(Japan) Takeshi Kamura (Japan) Keigo Sonoda	20	10

Final
1	(Indonesia) Marcus Fernaldi Gideon (Indonesia) Kevin Sanjaya Sukamuljo	21	23
4	(Indonesia) Mohammad Ahsan (Indonesia) Hendra Setiawan	18	21

=== Top half ===
==== Section 1 ====
First Round
1	(Indonesia) M F Gideon (Indonesia) K S Sukamuljo	21	21
(China) He JT (China) Tan Q	18	12
(Japan) T Hoki (Japan) Y Kobayashi	21	21
(China) Ou XY (China) Zhang N	16	14
7	(China) Han CK (China) Zhou HD	21	21
(Netherlands) J Maas (Netherlands) R Tabeling	10	11
(Malaysia) Ong Y S (Malaysia) Teo E Y	21	14	18
(Malaysia) A Chia (Malaysia) Soh W Y	15	21	21

Second Round
1	(Indonesia) M F Gideon (Indonesia) K S Sukamuljo	21	21
(Japan) T Hoki (Japan) Y Kobayashi	8	19
7	(China) Han CK (China) Zhou HD	20	25	14
(Malaysia) A Chia (Malaysia) Soh W Y	22	23	21

Quarter-finals
1	(Indonesia) M F Gideon (Indonesia) K S Sukamuljo	21	22	21
(Malaysia) A Chia (Malaysia) Soh W Y	14	24	15

==== Section 2 ====
First Round
3	(China) Li JH (China) Liu YC	21	21
(Canada) J Ho-shue (Canada) N Yakura	12	17
(Indonesia) B Angriawan (Indonesia) Hardianto	21	19	13
(Thailand) B Isara (Thailand) M Jongjit	17	21	21
5	(Japan) H Endo (Japan) Y Watanabe	21	22
(Chinese Taipei) Liao M-c (Chinese Taipei) Su C-h	7	20
(Malaysia) Goh S F (Malaysia) N Izzuddin M R	21	21
(India) M Attri (India) B. S Reddy	12	16

Second Round
3	(China) Li JH (China) Liu YC	24	21
(Thailand) B Isara (Thailand) M Jongjit	22	19
5	(Japan) H Endo (Japan) Y Watanabe	21	21
(Malaysia) Goh S F (Malaysia) N Izzuddin M R	16	17

Quarter-finals
3	(China) Li JH (China) Liu YC	22	21	21
5	(Japan) H Endo (Japan) Y Watanabe	24	12	12

=== Bottom half ===
==== Section 3 ====
First Round
(Russia) V Ivanov (Russia) I Sozonov	20	16
(South Korea) Ko S-h (South Korea) Shin B-c	22	21
(Chinese Taipei) Lu C-y (Chinese Taipei) Yang P-h	10	13
6	(Indonesia) F Alfian (Indonesia) M R Ardianto	21	21
(Indonesia) W Nayaka (Indonesia) A Yusuf	24	21
(Malaysia) Goh V S (Malaysia) Tan W K	22	10
(Germany) M Lamsfuß (Germany) M E Seidel	16	17
4	(Indonesia) M Ahsan (Indonesia) H Setiawan	21	21

Second Round
(South Korea) Ko S-h (South Korea) Shin B-c	11	21	21
6	(Indonesia) F Alfian (Indonesia) M R Ardianto	21	12	18
(Indonesia) W Nayaka (Indonesia) A Yusuf	21	18	20
4	(Indonesia) M Ahsan (Indonesia) H Setiawan	16	21	22

Quarter-finals
(South Korea) Ko S-h (South Korea) Shin B-c	17	21	19
4	(Indonesia) M Ahsan (Indonesia) H Setiawan	21	19	21

==== Section 4 ====
First Round
(England) M Ellis (England) C Langridge	16	17
(India) S Rankireddy (India) C Shetty	21	21
(South Korea) Choi S-g (South Korea) Seo S-j	18	21	14
PFR	(China) Huang KX (China) Liu C	21	17	21
(Japan) T Inoue (Japan) Y Kaneko	16	15
(Chinese Taipei) Lee Y (Chinese Taipei) Wang C-l	21	21
(Malaysia) M Arif A L (Malaysia) N M Azriyn A	21	13	8
2	(Japan) T Kamura (Japan) K Sonoda	18	21	21

Second Round
(India) S Rankireddy (India) C Shetty	15	21	21
PFR	(China) Huang KX (China) Liu C	21	11	19
(Chinese Taipei) Lee Y (Chinese Taipei) Wang C-l	16	18
2	(Japan) T Kamura (Japan) K Sonoda	21	21

Quarter-finals
(India) S Rankireddy (India) C Shetty	19	18
2	(Japan) T Kamura (Japan) K Sonoda	21	21

== Women's doubles ==
=== Seeds ===
1. (Japan) Mayu Matsumoto / Wakana Nagahara (final)
2. (Japan) Yuki Fukushima / Sayaka Hirota (quarter-finals)
3. (Japan) Misaki Matsutomo / Ayaka Takahashi (semi-finals)
4. (China) Chen Qingchen / Jia Yifan (second round)
5. (Indonesia) Greysia Polii / Apriyani Rahayu (quarter-finals)
6. (South Korea) Lee So-hee / Shin Seung-chan (second round)
7. (Japan) Shiho Tanaka / Koharu Yonemoto (first round)
8. (China) Du Yue / Li Yinhui (quarter-finals)

=== Finals ===
Semi-finals
1	(Japan) Mayu Matsumoto (Japan) Wakana Nagahara	21	21
3	(Japan) Misaki Matsutomo (Japan) Ayaka Takahashi	16	19
(South Korea) Kim So-yeong (South Korea) Kong Hee-yong	21	21
(China) Li Wenmei (China) Zheng Yu	16	11

Final
1	(Japan) Mayu Matsumoto (Japan) Wakana Nagahara	12	12
(South Korea) Kim So-yeong (South Korea) Kong Hee-yong	21	21

=== Top half ===
==== Section 1 ====
First Round
1	(Japan) M Matsumoto (Japan) W Nagahara	21	21
(Indonesia) Y Barkah (Indonesia) J F Sugiarto	11	18
(China) Liu XX (China) Xia YT	19	11
(Malaysia) Chow M K (Malaysia) Lee M Y	21	21
7	(Japan) S Tanaka (Japan) K Yonemoto	13	20
(Japan) N Matsuyama (Japan) C Shida	21	22
(Thailand) J Kititharakul (Thailand) R Prajongjai	21	17	21
(Malaysia) V Hoo K M (Malaysia) Yap C W	18	21	18

Second Round
1	(Japan) M Matsumoto (Japan) W Nagahara	21	21
(Malaysia) Chow M K (Malaysia) Lee M Y	18	19
(Japan) N Matsuyama (Japan) C Shida	16	21	21
(Thailand) J Kititharakul (Thailand) R Prajongjai	21	12	13

Quarter-finals
1	(Japan) M Matsumoto (Japan) W Nagahara	23	21
(Japan) N Matsuyama (Japan) C Shida	21	18

==== Section 2 ====
First Round
3	(Japan) M Matsutomo (Japan) A Takahashi	21	21
(England) C Birch (England) L Smith	13	13
(South Korea) Chang Y-n (South Korea) Kim H-r	21	21
(Japan) A Sakuramoto (Japan) Y Takahata	17	16
8	(China) Du Y (China) Li YH	21	15	22
(Indonesia) D D Haris (Indonesia) R A Pradipta	18	21	20
(Canada) R Honderich (Canada) K Tsai	9	21	11
(South Korea) Baek H-n (South Korea) Jung K-e	21	18	21

Second Round
3	(Japan) M Matsutomo (Japan) A Takahashi	21	21
(South Korea) Chang Y-n (South Korea) Kim H-r	17	13
8	(China) Du Y (China) Li YH	21	21
(South Korea) Baek H-n (South Korea) Jung K-e	12	18

Quarter-finals
3	(Japan) M Matsutomo (Japan) A Takahashi	21	21
8	(China) Du Y (China) Li YH	16	18

=== Bottom half ===
==== Section 3 ====
First Round
(China) Dong WJ (China) Feng XY	21	21
(Chinese Taipei) Hsu Y-c (Chinese Taipei) Hu L-f	19	16
(Netherlands) S Piek (Netherlands) C Seinen	14	13
5	(Indonesia) G Polii (Indonesia) A Rahayu	21	21
(India) A Ponnappa (India) N. S Reddy	16	14
(South Korea) Kim S-y (South Korea) Kong H-y	21	21
(Hong Kong) Ng T Y (Hong Kong) Yuen S Y	17	17
4	(China) Chen QC (China) Jia YF	21	21

Second Round
(China) Dong WJ (China) Feng XY	17	17
5	(Indonesia) G Polii (Indonesia) A Rahayu	21	21
(South Korea) Kim S-y (South Korea) Kong H-y	21	19	21
4	(China) Chen QC (China) Jia YF	19	21	16

Quarter-finals
5	(Indonesia) G Polii (Indonesia) A Rahayu	12	12
(South Korea) Kim S-y (South Korea) Kong H-y	21	21

==== Section 4 ====
First Round
(Thailand) P Supajirakul (Thailand) S Taerattanachai	17	21	16
(China) Li WM (China) Zheng Y	21	16	21
(Denmark) M Fruergaard (Denmark) S Thygesen	15	14
6	(South Korea) Lee S-h (South Korea) Shin S-c	21	21
(Thailand) C Chaladchalam (Thailand) P Muenwong	15	17
(France) D Delrue (France) L Palermo	21	21
(Russia) E Bolotova (Russia) A Davletova	8	8
2	(Japan) Y Fukushima (Japan) S Hirota	21	21

Second Round
(China) Li WM (China) Zheng Y	15	21	21
6	(South Korea) Lee S-h (South Korea) Shin S-c	21	19	19
(France) D Delrue (France) L Palermo	15	2
2	(Japan) Y Fukushima (Japan) S Hirota	21	21

Quarter-finals
(China) Li WM (China) Zheng Y	21	21
2	(Japan) Y Fukushima (Japan) S Hirota	16	14

== Mixed doubles ==
=== Seeds ===
1. (China) Zheng Siwei / Huang Yaqiong (quarter-finals)
2. (China) Wang Yilyu / Huang Dongping (champions)
3. (Japan) Yuta Watanabe / Arisa Higashino (quarter-finals)
4. (Thailand) Dechapol Puavaranukroh / Sapsiree Taerattanachai (quarter-finals)
5. (Malaysia) Chan Peng Soon / Goh Liu Ying (semi-finals)
6. (Indonesia) Hafiz Faizal / Gloria Emanuelle Widjaja (semi-finals)
7. (Indonesia) Praveen Jordan / Melati Daeva Oktavianti (final)
8. (Hong Kong) Tang Chun Man / Tse Ying Suet (first round)

=== Finals ===
Semi-finals
6	(Indonesia) Hafiz Faizal (Indonesia) Gloria Emanuelle Widjaja	15	18
7	(Indonesia) Praveen Jordan (Indonesia) Melati Daeva Oktavianti	21	21
5	(Malaysia) Chan Peng Soon (Malaysia) Goh Liu Ying	10	6
2	(China) Wang Yilyu (China) Huang Dongping	21	21

Final
7	(Indonesia) Praveen Jordan (Indonesia) Melati Daeva Oktavianti	17	16
2	(China) Wang Yilyu (China) Huang Dongping	21	21

=== Top half ===
==== Section 1 ====
First Round
1	(China) Zheng SW (China) Huang YQ	21	21
(India) P Chopra (India) N. S Reddy	11	14
(Thailand) N Phuangphuapet (Thailand) S Amitrapai	11	21	7
(China) Lu K (China) Chen L	21	16	21
6	(Indonesia) H Faizal (Indonesia) G E Widjaja	21	21
(Malaysia) Goh S H (Malaysia) S J Lai	19	18
(Japan) K Gondo (Japan) A Kurihara	19	14
(England) M Ellis (England) L Smith	21	21

Second Round
1	(China) Zheng SW (China) Huang YQ	21	21
(China) Lu K (China) Chen L	14	19
6	(Indonesia) H Faizal (Indonesia) G E Widjaja	21	21	21
(England) M Ellis (England) L Smith	23	13	13

Quarter-finals
1	(China) Zheng SW (China) Huang YQ	17	21	19
6	(Indonesia) H Faizal (Indonesia) G E Widjaja	21	15	21

==== Section 2 ====
First Round
4	(Thailand) D Puavaranukroh (Thailand) S Taerattanachai	21	21
(Japan) T Hoki (Japan) W Nagahara	17	8
(India) S Rankireddy (India) A Ponnappa	21	21
(Germany) M E Seidel (Germany) L Efler	14	19
7	(Indonesia) P Jordan (Indonesia) M D Oktavianti	21	19	21
(Japan) Y Kaneko (Japan) M Matsutomo	15	21	10
(China) Ou XY (China) Feng XY	17	16
(Hong Kong) Chang T C (Hong Kong) Ng W Y	21	21

Second Round
4	(Thailand) D Puavaranukroh (Thailand) S Taerattanachai	21	21
(India) S Rankireddy (India) A Ponnappa	16	17
7	(Indonesia) P Jordan (Indonesia) M D Oktavianti	21	21
(Hong Kong) Chang T C (Hong Kong) Ng W Y	11	13

Quarter-finals
4	(Thailand) D Puavaranukroh (Thailand) S Taerattanachai	15	15
7	(Indonesia) P Jordan (Indonesia) M D Oktavianti	21	21

=== Bottom half ===
==== Section 3 ====
First Round
(Indonesia) T Ahmad (Indonesia) W O Kandow	15	13
(France) T Gicquel (France) D Delrue	21	21
(China) He JT (China) Du Y	21	17
5	(Malaysia) Chan P S (Malaysia) Goh L Y	23	21
(Denmark) M Christiansen (Denmark) A Bøje	16	21	21
(Indonesia) R Rivaldy (Indonesia) P H Mentari	21	8	17
(South Korea) Seo S-j (South Korea) Chae Y-j	13	15
3	(Japan) Y Watanabe (Japan) A Higashino	21	21

Second Round
(France) T Gicquel (France) D Delrue	18	11
5	(Malaysia) Chan P S (Malaysia) Goh L Y	21	21
(Denmark) M Christiansen (Denmark) A Bøje	21	17
3	(Japan) Y Watanabe (Japan) A Higashino	23	21

Quarter-finals
5	(Malaysia) Chan P S (Malaysia) Goh L Y	21	22
3	(Japan) Y Watanabe (Japan) A Higashino	18	20

==== Section 4 ====
First Round
(Malaysia) Tan K M (Malaysia) Lai P J	18	21
(Germany) M Lamsfuß (Germany) I Herttrich	21	23
(Netherlands) R Tabeling (Netherlands) S Piek	21	21
8	(Hong Kong) Tang C M (Hong Kong) Tse Y S	13	17
(Republic of Ireland) S Magee (Republic of Ireland) C Magee	21	20
(Russia) R Alimov (Russia) A Davletova	23	22
PFR	(Chinese Taipei) Lu C-y (Chinese Taipei) Lee C-h	15	13
2	(China) Wang YL (China) Huang DP	21	21

Second Round
(Germany) M Lamsfuß (Germany) I Herttrich	26	27	21
(Netherlands) R Tabeling (Netherlands) S Piek	24	29	16
(Russia) R Alimov (Russia) A Davletova	11	7
2	(China) Wang YL (China) Huang DP	21	21

Quarter-finals
(Germany) M Lamsfuß (Germany) I Herttrich	10	18
2	(China) Wang YL (China) Huang DP	21	21

Preceded by 2019 Indonesia Open	BWF World Tour; 2019 BWF season	Succeeded by 2019 Thailand Open
