= Wakana Nagahara =

Japanese badminton player (born 1996)

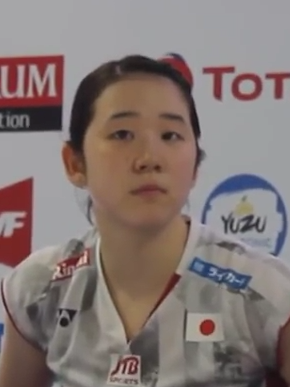
- Nagahara in 2018

Personal information
- Born: 9 January 1996 (age 30) Memuro, Hokkaido, Japan
- Height: 1.68 m (5 ft 6 in)

Sport
- Country: Japan
- Sport: Badminton
- Handedness: Right
- Retired: 2 February 2025

Women's & mixed doubles
- Highest ranking: 1 (WD with Mayu Matsumoto, 30 April 2019); 19 (XD with Takuro Hoki, 9 July 2019)
- BWF profile
Medal record
Women's badminton
Representing Japan
World Championships
Gold medal – first place	2018 Nanjing	Women's doubles
Gold medal – first place	2019 Basel	Women's doubles
Bronze medal – third place	2021 Huelva	Women's doubles
Bronze medal – third place	2022 Tokyo	Women's doubles
Sudirman Cup
Silver medal – second place	2019 Nanning	Mixed team
Bronze medal – third place	2023 Suzhou	Mixed team
Uber Cup
Bronze medal – third place	2022 Bangkok	Women's team
Bronze medal – third place	2024 Chengdu	Women's team
Asian Championships
Silver medal – second place	2019 Wuhan	Women's doubles
Bronze medal – third place	2023 Dubai	Women's doubles
Asia Team Championships
Gold medal – first place	2020 Manila	Women's team
World Junior Championships
Bronze medal – third place	2014 Alor Setar	Mixed team
Asian Junior Championships
Bronze medal – third place	2013 Kota Kinabalu	Mixed team
Bronze medal – third place	2014 Taipei	Mixed team

Wakana Nagahara (永原 和可那, Nagahara Wakana; born 9 January 1996) is a Japanese badminton player. She is a two-time world champion in the women's doubles. Nagahara attended Aomori Yamada High School, and was part of the Japanese national junior team that won the bronze medals at the 2013, 2014 Asian and 2014 World Junior Championships. She won her first senior international title at the 2014 Smiling Fish International in the women's doubles event partnered with Mayu Matsumoto. In national events, she plays for the Hokuto Bank team. Nagahara was awarded as the 2018 Most Improved Player of the Year by the BWF together with her partner Mayu Matsumoto. They obtained the honour after winning the 2018 BWF World Championships title and improving their ranking from 14 to 3 in the world. On 30 April 2019, she reached a career high as the women's doubles world No. 1.

== Career ==
=== 2021 ===
In March, Nagahara and her partner Mayu Matsumoto won their first World Tour Super 1000 title in the All England Open defeating their compatriots, the defending champion, and current world number 1, Yuki Fukushima and Sayaka Hirota in the final. She competed at the 2020 Summer Olympics partnering Matsumoto as 3rd seeds, and her pace was stopped by Kim So-yeong and Kong Hee-yong of South Korea in the quarter-finals.

== Awards and nominations ==
Award	Year	Category	Result	Ref.
BWF Awards	2018	Most Improved Player of the Year with Mayu Matsumoto	Won	

== Achievements ==
=== World Championships ===
Women's doubles
Year	Venue	Partner	Opponent	Score	Result	Ref.
2018	Nanjing Youth Olympic Sports Park, Nanjing, China	(Japan) Mayu Matsumoto	(Japan) Yuki Fukushima (Japan) Sayaka Hirota	19–21, 21–19, 22–20	Gold	
2019	St. Jakobshalle, Basel, Switzerland	(Japan) Mayu Matsumoto	(Japan) Yuki Fukushima (Japan) Sayaka Hirota	21–11, 20–22, 23–21	Gold	
2021	Palacio de los Deportes Carolina Marín, Huelva, Spain	(Japan) Mayu Matsumoto	(China) Chen Qingchen (China) Jia Yifan	15–21, 12–21	Bronze	
2022	Tokyo Metropolitan Gymnasium, Tokyo, Japan	(Japan) Mayu Matsumoto	(China) Chen Qingchen (China) Jia Yifan	13–21, 14–21	Bronze	

=== Asian Championships ===
Women's doubles
Year	Venue	Partner	Opponent	Score	Result	Ref.
2019	Wuhan Sports Center Gymnasium; Wuhan, China	(Japan) Mayu Matsumoto	(China) Chen Qingchen (China) Jia Yifan	21–19, 14–21, 19–21	Silver	
2023	Sheikh Rashid Bin Hamdan Indoor Hall; Dubai, United Arab Emirates	(Japan) Mayu Matsumoto	(South Korea) Baek Ha-na (South Korea) Lee So-hee	21–16, 8–21, 13–21	Bronze	

=== BWF World Tour (5 titles, 10 runners-up) ===
The BWF World Tour, which was announced on 19 March 2017 and implemented in 2018, is a series of elite badminton tournaments sanctioned by the Badminton World Federation (BWF). The BWF World Tour is divided into levels of World Tour Finals, Super 1000, Super 750, Super 500, Super 300 (part of the HSBC World Tour), and the BWF Tour Super 100.

Women's doubles
Year	Tournament	Level	Partner	Opponent	Score	Result	Ref.
2018	Indonesia Open	Super 1000	(Japan) Mayu Matsumoto	(Japan) Yuki Fukushima (Japan) Sayaka Hirota	14–21, 21–16, 14–21	(silver) Runner-up	
2018	Spain Masters	Super 300	(Japan) Mayu Matsumoto	(Japan) Ayako Sakuramoto (Japan) Yukiko Takahata	21–17, 21–13	(gold) Winner	
2018	China Open	Super 1000	(Japan) Mayu Matsumoto	(Japan) Misaki Matsutomo (Japan) Ayaka Takahashi	16–21, 12–21	(silver) Runner-up	
2018	French Open	Super 750	(Japan) Mayu Matsumoto	(Bulgaria) Gabriela Stoeva (Bulgaria) Stefani Stoeva	21–14, 21–19	(gold) Winner	
2018	Fuzhou China Open	Super 750	(Japan) Mayu Matsumoto	(South Korea) Lee So-hee (South Korea) Shin Seung-chan	21–23, 18–21	(silver) Runner-up	
2019	All England Open	Super 1000	(Japan) Mayu Matsumoto	(China) Chen Qingchen (China) Jia Yifan	21–18, 20–22, 11–21	(silver) Runner-up	
2019	Singapore Open	Super 500	(Japan) Mayu Matsumoto	(South Korea) Kim Hye-jeong (South Korea) Kong Hee-yong	21–17, 22–20	(gold) Winner	
2019	Japan Open	Super 750	(Japan) Mayu Matsumoto	(South Korea) Kim So-yeong (South Korea) Kong Hee-yong	12–21, 12–21	(silver) Runner-up	
2019	BWF World Tour Finals	World Tour Finals	(Japan) Mayu Matsumoto	(China) Chen Qingchen (China) Jia Yifan	14–21, 10–21	(silver) Runner-up	
2020	Denmark Open	Super 750	(Japan) Mayu Matsumoto	(Japan) Yuki Fukushima (Japan) Sayaka Hirota	10–21, 21–16, 18–21	(silver) Runner-up	
2021	All England Open	Super 1000	(Japan) Mayu Matsumoto	(Japan) Yuki Fukushima (Japan) Sayaka Hirota	21–18, 21–16	(gold) Winner	
2022	Thailand Open	Super 500	(Japan) Mayu Matsumoto	(Japan) Nami Matsuyama (Japan) Chiharu Shida	21–17, 15–21, 24–26	(silver) Runner-up	
2022	French Open	Super 750	(Japan) Mayu Matsumoto	(Malaysia) Pearly Tan (Malaysia) Thinaah Muralitharan	19–21, 21–18, 15–21	(silver) Runner-up	
2023	Canada Open	Super 500	(Japan) Mayu Matsumoto	(Japan) Nami Matsuyama (Japan) Chiharu Shida	20–22, 16–21	(silver) Runner-up	
2024	India Open	Super 750	(Japan) Mayu Matsumoto	(China) Zhang Shuxian (China) Zheng Yu	21–12, 21–13	(gold) Winner	

=== BWF Grand Prix (2 titles, 4 runners-up) ===
The BWF Grand Prix had two levels, the Grand Prix and Grand Prix Gold. It was a series of badminton tournaments sanctioned by the Badminton World Federation (BWF) and played between 2007 and 2017.

Women's doubles
Year	Tournament	Partner	Opponent	Score	Result	Ref.
2014	Russian Open	(Japan) Mayu Matsumoto	(Japan) Yuriko Miki (Japan) Koharu Yonemoto	17–21, 7–21	(silver) Runner-up	
2016	U.S. Open	(Japan) Mayu Matsumoto	(Japan) Shiho Tanaka (Japan) Koharu Yonemoto	22–20, 15–21, 19–21	(silver) Runner-up	
2016	Thailand Open	(Japan) Mayu Matsumoto	(Thailand) Puttita Supajirakul (Thailand) Sapsiree Taerattanachai	12–21, 17–21	(silver) Runner-up	
2017	Canada Open	(Japan) Mayu Matsumoto	(Japan) Chisato Hoshi (Japan) Naru Shinoya	21–16, 16–21, 21–18	(gold) Winner	
2017	U.S. Open	(Japan) Mayu Matsumoto	(South Korea) Lee So-hee (South Korea) Shin Seung-chan	16–21, 13–21	(silver) Runner-up	

Mixed doubles
Year	Tournament	Partner	Opponent	Score	Result	Ref.
2016	U.S. Open	(Japan) Yugo Kobayashi	(Poland) Robert Mateusiak (Poland) Nadieżda Zięba	21–16, 21–18	(gold) Winner	

BWF Grand Prix Gold tournament
BWF Grand Prix tournament

=== BWF International Challenge/Series (1 title) ===
Women's doubles
Year	Tournament	Partner	Opponent	Score	Result	Ref.
2014	Smiling Fish International	(Japan) Mayu Matsumoto	(Thailand) Pacharapun Chochuwong (Thailand) Chanisa Teachavorasinskun	21–17, 21–11	(gold) Winner	

BWF International Challenge tournament
BWF International Series tournament

== Performance timeline ==
Key

W	Won	F	Finalist	SF	Semi-finalist
QF	Quarter-finalist	#R	Rounds 4, 3, 2, 1	RR	Round-robin stage
Q#	Qualification round	A	Absent	w/d	Withdrew
G	Gold	S	Silver	B	Bronze
NH	Not held	N/A	Not applicable	DNQ	Did not qualify

=== National team ===
- Junior level

Team events	2013	2014
Asian Junior Championships	B	B
World Junior Championships	4th	B

- Senior level

Team events	2019	2020	2021	2022	2023	2024
Asia Team Championships	NH	G	NH	A	NH	A
Uber Cup	NH	A	NH	B	NH	B
Sudirman Cup	S	NH	A	NH	B	NH

=== Individual competitions ===
==== Senior level ====
===== Women's doubles =====
Events	2018	2019	2020	2021	2022	2023	2024	Ref
Asian Championships	A	S	NH		A	B	QF	
World Championships	G	G	NH	B	B	3R	NH	
Olympic Games	NH		QF	NH			RR	

Tournament	BWF Superseries / Grand Prix				BWF World Tour							Best	Ref
Tournament	2014	2015	2016	2017	2018	2019	2020	2021	2022	2023	2024	Best	Ref
Malaysia Open	A				QF	QF	NH		SF	A	2R	SF ('22)	
India Open	A						NH		A		W	W ('24)	
Indonesia Masters	A			NH	A	SF	2R	A		w/d	w/d	SF ('19)	
German Open	A				2R	SF	NH		w/d	QF	A	SF ('19)	
French Open	A			SF	W	SF	NH	A	F	SF	SF	W ('18)	
All England Open	A				SF	F	QF	W	w/d	QF	1R	W ('21)	
Spain Masters	NH				W	A			NH	A		W ('18)	
Thailand Open	NH	A	F	A	QF	QF	w/d	NH	F	A		F ('16, '22)	
Thailand Open	NH	A	F	A	QF	QF	w/d	NH	F	A		F ('16, '22)	
Malaysia Masters	A		1R	A		SF	w/d	NH	2R	SF	A	SF ('19, '23)	
Singapore Open	A					W	NH		A	QF	QF	W ('19)	
Indonesia Open	A				F	QF	NH	A	1R	SF	SF	F ('18)	
Australian Open	A					QF	NH		QF	QF	A	QF ('19, '22, '23)	
U.S. Open	A	1R	F	F	A		NH			A		F ('16, '17)	
Canada Open	A	QF	A	W	A		NH		A	F	A	W ('17)	
Japan Open	A	1R	1R	1R	QF	F	NH		QF	SF	1R	F ('19)	
Korea Open	A			QF	QF	2R	NH		A	SF	Ret.	SF ('23)	
Chinese Taipei Open	2R	1R	A	SF	A		NH		A		Ret.	SF ('17)	
Hong Kong Open	A			QF	1R	SF	NH			QF	Ret.	SF ('19)	
China Open	A				F	2R	NH			QF	Ret.	F ('18)	
Macau Open	A			QF	A		NH				Ret.	QF ('17)	
Denmark Open	A				1R	SF	F	A	1R	SF	Ret.	F ('20)	
Korea Masters	A		QF	A			NH		A		Ret.	QF ('16)	
Japan Masters	NH									SF	Ret.	SF ('23)	
China Masters	A		2R	1R	F	SF	NH			QF	Ret.	F ('18)	
Superseries / World Tour Finals	DNQ				SF	F	DNQ			w/d	Ret.	F ('19)	
New Zealand Open	A		2R	2R	A	QF	NH				Ret.	QF ('19)	
Russian Open	F	w/d	A				NH				Ret.	F ('14)	
Year-end ranking	101	94	32	14	3	3	3	5	8	9	—	1	
Tournament	2014	2015	2016	2017	2018	2019	2020	2021	2022	2023	2024	Best	

===== Mixed doubles =====
Events	2019
Asian Championships	2R
World Championships	3R

Tournament	SS / GP		BWF World Tour			Best
Tournament	2016	2017	2018	2019	2020	Best
Malaysia Masters	A			2R	QF	QF ('20)
Indonesia Masters	A	NH	A	QF	1R	QF ('19)
German Open	A			1R	NH	1R ('19)
All England Open	A			1R	1R	1R ('19, '20)
Singapore Open	A			1R	NH	1R ('19)
Australian Open	A			2R	NH	2R ('19)
U.S. Open	W	SF	A		NH	W ('16)
Canada Open	A	SF	A		NH	SF ('17)
Korea Open	A			1R	NH	1R ('19)
China Open	A			1R	NH	1R ('19)
Japan Open	1R	1R	A	1R	NH	1R ('16, '17, '19)
Denmark Open	A		1R	2R	w/d	2R ('19)
French Open	A		QF	QF	NH	QF ('18, '19)
Fuzhou China Open	A	1R	2R	1R	NH	2R ('18)
Hong Kong Open	A		QF	2R	NH	QF ('18)
Indonesia Open	A			1R	NH	1R ('19)
Malaysia Open	A			1R	NH	1R ('19)
Thailand Open	A			1R	w/d	1R ('19)
Thailand Open	A			1R	w/d	1R ('19)
Year-end ranking	122	94	64	25	25	19
Tournament	2016	2017	2018	2019	2020	Best
