= Kim So-yeong =

South Korean badminton player (born 1992)

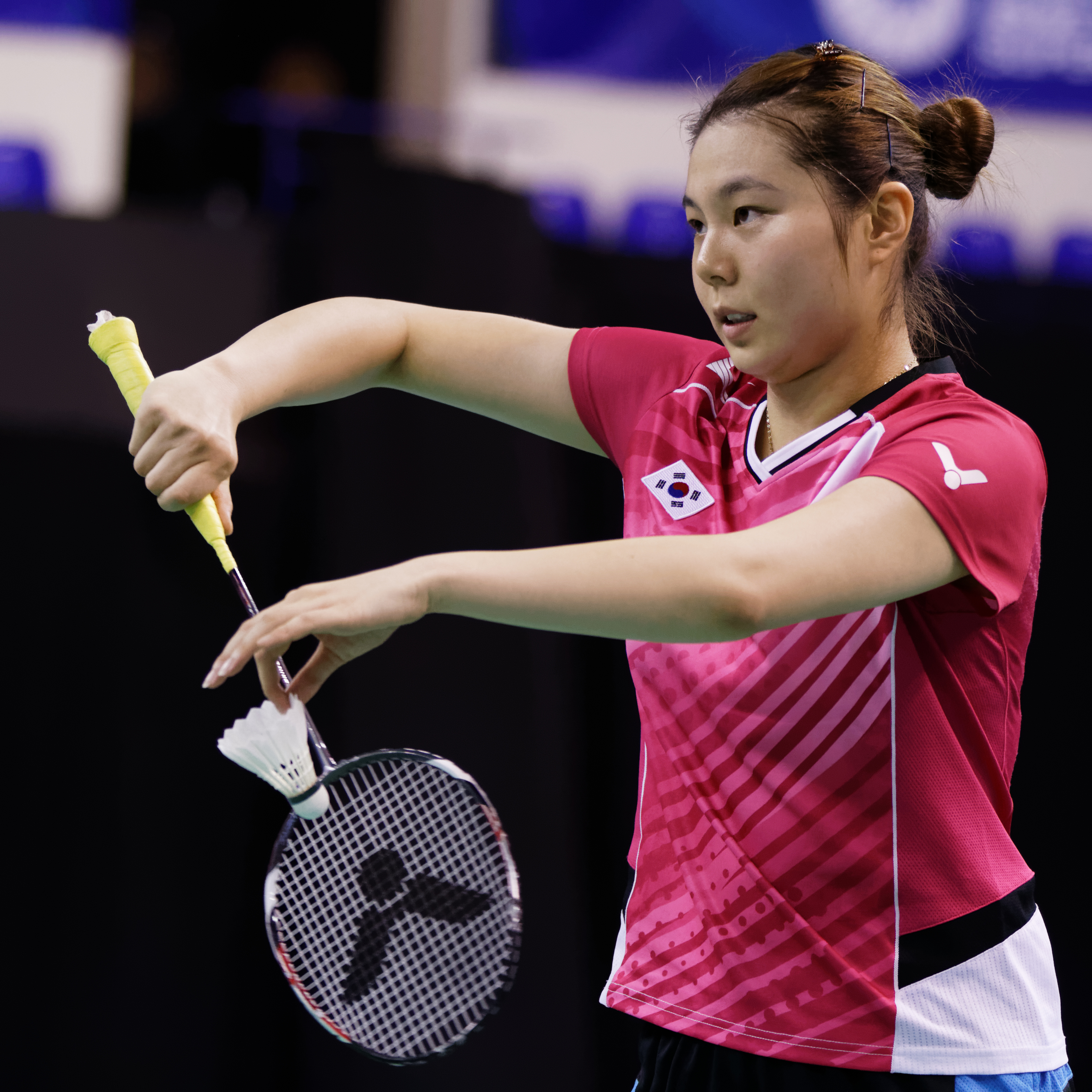
- Kim at the 2013 French Super Series

Personal information
- Nickname: Kim So-young
- Born: 9 July 1992 (age 34) Daegu, South Korea
- Height: 1.73 m (5 ft 8 in)
- Weight: 58 kg (128 lb)

Sport
- Country: South Korea
- Sport: Badminton
- Handedness: Right

Women's & mixed doubles
- Highest ranking: 1 (WD with Kong Hee-yong 4 October 2022); 20 (XD with Kim Gi-jung 10 July 2014)
- BWF profile
Medal record
Women's badminton
Representing South Korea
Olympic Games
Bronze medal – third place	2020 Tokyo	Women's doubles
World Championships
Silver medal – second place	2022 Tokyo	Women's doubles
Bronze medal – third place	2021 Huelva	Women's doubles
Bronze medal – third place	2023 Copenhagen	Women's doubles
Sudirman Cup
Silver medal – second place	2013 Kuala Lumpur	Mixed team
Silver medal – second place	2023 Suzhou	Mixed team
Bronze medal – third place	2021 Vantaa	Mixed team
Uber Cup
Gold medal – first place	2022 Bangkok	Women's team
Bronze medal – third place	2014 New Delhi	Women's team
Bronze medal – third place	2018 Bangkok	Women's team
Bronze medal – third place	2020 Aarhus	Women's team
Asian Games
Gold medal – first place	2022 Hangzhou	Women's team
Silver medal – second place	2014 Incheon	Women's team
Bronze medal – third place	2022 Hangzhou	Women's doubles
Asian Championships
Bronze medal – third place	2018 Wuhan	Women's doubles
Asia Team Championships
Silver medal – second place	2020 Manila	Women's team
Summer Universiade
Gold medal – first place	2013 Kazan	Women's doubles
Gold medal – first place	2013 Kazan	Mixed doubles
Gold medal – first place	2013 Kazan	Mixed team

Korean name
- Hangul: 김소영
- Hanja: 金昭映
- RR: Gim Soyeong
- MR: Kim Soyŏng

Kim So-yeong (Korean: 김소영; born 9 July 1992) is a South Korean badminton player. She is widely recognized for her exceptional defensive skills, tactical intelligence, and powerful net play. She reached the world number one ranking in the women's doubles alongside Kong Hee-yong. Kim won a bronze medal at the 2020 Tokyo Olympics, a silver and two bronze medals at the BWF World Championships, as well a bronze in the 2018 Asian Championships and 2022 Asian Games. Kim also part of Korea winning team in the 2022 Uber Cup and Asian Games. Together with her partner Kong, they were honored as the 2019 BWF Most Improved Player of the Year.

== Career ==
Kim, who attended the University of Incheon, was the triple crowns at the 2013 Summer Universiade, winning the gold medals in the women's doubles, mixed doubles and team event.

Kim competed at the 2014 Asian Games, clinched the silver medal in the women's team event.

== Achievements ==
=== Olympic Games ===
Women's doubles
Year	Venue	Partner	Opponent	Score	Result
2020	Musashino Forest Sport Plaza; Tokyo, Japan	(South Korea) Kong Hee-yong	(South Korea) Lee So-hee (South Korea) Shin Seung-chan	21–10, 21–17	Bronze

=== World Championships ===
Women's doubles
Year	Venue	Partner	Opponent	Score	Result
2021	Palacio de los Deportes Carolina Marín; Huelva, Spain	(South Korea) Kong Hee-yong	(South Korea) Lee So-hee (South Korea) Shin Seung-chan	18–21, 17–21	Bronze
2022	Tokyo Metropolitan Gymnasium; Tokyo, Japan	(South Korea) Kong Hee-yong	(China) Chen Qingchen (China) Jia Yifan	20–22, 14–21	Silver
2023	Royal Arena; Copenhagen, Denmark	(South Korea) Kong Hee-yong	(Indonesia) Apriyani Rahayu (Indonesia) Siti Fadia Silva Ramadhanti	9–21, 20–22	Bronze

=== Asian Games ===
Women's doubles
Year	Venue	Partner	Opponent	Score	Result
2022	Binjiang Gymnasium; Hangzhou, China	(South Korea) Kong Hee-yong	(China) Chen Qingchen (China) Jia Yifan	21–16, 9–21, 12–21	Bronze

=== Asian Championships ===
Women's doubles
Year	Venue	Partner	Opponent	Score	Result
2018	Wuhan Sports Center Gymnasium; Wuhan, China	(South Korea) Kong Hee-yong	(Japan) Misaki Matsutomo (Japan) Ayaka Takahashi	17–21, 22–20, 14–21	Bronze

=== Summer Universiade ===
Women's doubles
Year	Venue	Partner	Opponent	Score	Result
2013	Tennis Academy; Kazan, Russia	(South Korea) Chang Ye-na	(China) Luo Yu (China) Tian Qing	27–25, 15–21, 23–21	Gold

Mixed doubles
Year	Venue	Partner	Opponent	Score	Result
2013	Tennis Academy; Kazan, Russia	(South Korea) Kim Gi-jung	(China) Liu Cheng (China) Tian Qing	22–20, 21–14	Gold

=== BWF World Tour (11 titles, 8 runners-up) ===
The BWF World Tour, which was announced on 19 March 2017 and implemented in 2018, is a series of elite badminton tournaments sanctioned by the Badminton World Federation (BWF). The BWF World Tours are divided into levels of World Tour Finals, Super 1000, Super 750, Super 500, Super 300 (part of the HSBC World Tour), and the BWF Tour Super 100.

Women's doubles
Year	Tournament	Level	Partner	Opponent	Score	Result
2018	U.S. Open	Super 300	(South Korea) Kim Hye-jeong	(China) Tang Jinhua (China) Yu Xiaohan	21–18, 13–21, 15–21	(silver) Runner-up
2019	Indonesia Masters	Super 500	(South Korea) Kong Hee-yong	(Japan) Misaki Matsutomo (Japan) Ayaka Takahashi	19–21, 15–21	(silver) Runner-up
2019	Spain Masters	Super 300	(South Korea) Kong Hee-yong	(Japan) Nami Matsuyama (Japan) Chiharu Shida	23–21, 15–21, 21–17	(gold) Winner
2019	New Zealand Open	Super 300	(South Korea) Kong Hee-yong	(Japan) Misaki Matsutomo (Japan) Ayaka Takahashi	21–15, 21–18	(gold) Winner
2019	Japan Open	Super 750	(South Korea) Kong Hee-yong	(Japan) Mayu Matsumoto (Japan) Wakana Nagahara	21–12, 21–12	(gold) Winner
2019	Chinese Taipei Open	Super 300	(South Korea) Kong Hee-yong	(Thailand) Jongkolphan Kititharakul (Thailand) Rawinda Prajongjai	19–21, 21–18, 26–28	(silver) Runner-up
2019	Korea Open	Super 500	(South Korea) Kong Hee-yong	(South Korea) Lee So-hee (South Korea) Shin Seung-chan	13–21, 21–19, 21–17	(gold) Winner
2019	French Open	Super 750	(South Korea) Kong Hee-yong	(South Korea) Lee So-hee (South Korea) Shin Seung-chan	21–16, 19–21, 12–21	(silver) Runner-up
2020 (II)	Thailand Open	Super 1000	(South Korea) Kong Hee-yong	(South Korea) Lee So-hee (South Korea) Shin Seung-chan	21–18, 21–19	(gold) Winner
2020	BWF World Tour Finals	World Tour Finals	(South Korea) Kong Hee-yong	(South Korea) Lee So-hee (South Korea) Shin Seung-chan	21–15, 24–26, 19–21	(silver) Runner-up
2021	French Open	Super 750	(South Korea) Kong Hee-yong	(South Korea) Lee So-hee (South Korea) Shin Seung-chan	17–21, 12–21	(silver) Runner-up
2021	BWF World Tour Finals	World Tour Finals	(South Korea) Kong Hee-yong	(Japan) Nami Matsuyama (Japan) Chiharu Shida	21–14, 21–14	(gold) Winner
2022	Korea Masters	Super 300	(South Korea) Kong Hee-yong	(South Korea) Baek Ha-na (South Korea) Lee Yu-rim	21–17, 21–12	(gold) Winner
2023	All England Open	Super 1000	(South Korea) Kong Hee-yong	(South Korea) Baek Ha-na (South Korea) Lee So-hee	21–5, 21–12	(gold) Winner
2023	Thailand Open	Super 500	(South Korea) Kong Hee-yong	(Thailand) Benyapa Aimsaard (Thailand) Nuntakarn Aimsaard	21–13, 21–17	(gold) Winner
2023	Korea Open	Super 500	(South Korea) Kong Hee-yong	(China) Chen Qingchen (China) Jia Yifan	10–21, 21–17, 7–21	(silver) Runner-up
2023	Japan Open	Super 750	(South Korea) Kong Hee-yong	(China) Chen Qingchen (China) Jia Yifan	21–17, 21–14	(gold) Winner
2023	Australian Open	Super 500	(South Korea) Kong Hee-yong	(China) Liu Shengshu (China) Tan Ning	21–18, 21–16	(gold) Winner
2025	Korea Masters	Super 300	(South Korea) Lee Seo-jin	(Japan) Hinata Suzuki (Japan) Nao Yamakita	18–21, 23–25	(silver) Runner-up

=== BWF Grand Prix (3 titles, 3 runners-up) ===
The BWF Grand Prix had two levels, the Grand Prix and Grand Prix Gold. It was a series of badminton tournaments sanctioned by the Badminton World Federation (BWF) and played between 2007 and 2017.

Women's doubles
Year	Tournament	Partner	Opponent	Score	Result
2012	Macau Open	(South Korea) Choi Hye-in	(South Korea) Eom Hye-won (South Korea) Jang Ye-na	18–21, 16–21	(silver) Runner-up
2013	Korea Grand Prix Gold	(South Korea) Jang Ye-na	(South Korea) Go Ah-ra (South Korea) Yoo Hae-won	21–15, 21–12	(gold) Winner
2016	Indonesian Masters	(South Korea) Chae Yoo-jung	(Thailand) Jongkolphan Kititharakul (Thailand) Rawinda Prajongjai	21–18, 22–20	(gold) Winner
2016	Korea Masters	(South Korea) Chae Yoo-jung	(South Korea) Jung Kyung-eun (South Korea) Shin Seung-chan	14–21, 14–21	(silver) Runner-up
2017	Chinese Taipei Open	(South Korea) Chae Yoo-jung	(South Korea) Kim Hye-rin (South Korea) Yoo Hae-won	21–12, 21–11	(gold) Winner
2017	Korea Masters	(South Korea) Kong Hee-yong	(South Korea) Lee So-hee (South Korea) Shin Seung-chan	18–21, 21–23	(silver) Runner-up

BWF Grand Prix Gold tournament
BWF Grand Prix tournament

=== BWF International Challenge/Series (2 titles) ===
Women's doubles
Year	Tournament	Partner	Opponent	Score	Result
2017	Osaka International	(South Korea) Yoo Hae-won	(Japan) Ayako Sakuramoto (Japan) Yukiko Takahata	16–21, 21–17, 21–19	(gold) Winner
2026	Singapore International	(South Korea) Jung Kyung-eun	(South Korea) Kim Yu-jung (South Korea) Lee Yu-lim	24–22, 21–14	(gold) Winner

BWF International Challenge tournament
BWF International Series tournament
