= Kong Hee-yong =

South Korean badminton player (born 1996)

Personal information
- Born: 11 December 1996 (age 29) Daejeon, South Korea
- Height: 1.66 m (5 ft 5 in)

Sport
- Country: South Korea
- Sport: Badminton
- Handedness: Right

Women's & mixed doubles
- Highest ranking: 1 (WD with Kim So-yeong 4 October 2022); 3 (WD with Kim Hye-jeong, 21 October 2025); 91 (XD with Chung Eui-seok, 17 December 2015)
- Current ranking: 22 (WD with Kim Hye-jeong, 27 October 2026)
- BWF profile
Medal record
Women's badminton
Representing South Korea
Olympic Games
Bronze medal – third place	2020 Tokyo	Women's doubles
World Championships
Silver medal – second place	2022 Tokyo	Women's doubles
Bronze medal – third place	2021 Huelva	Women's doubles
Bronze medal – third place	2023 Copenhagen	Women's doubles
Sudirman Cup
Silver medal – second place	2023 Suzhou	Mixed team
Silver medal – second place	2025 Xiamen	Mixed team
Bronze medal – third place	2021 Vantaa	Mixed team
Uber Cup
Gold medal – first place	2022 Bangkok	Women's team
Bronze medal – third place	2018 Bangkok	Women's team
Bronze medal – third place	2020 Aarhus	Women's team
Bronze medal – third place	2024 Chengdu	Women's team
Asian Games
Gold medal – first place	2022 Hangzhou	Women's team
Bronze medal – third place	2022 Hangzhou	Women's doubles
Asian Championships
Bronze medal – third place	2018 Wuhan	Women's doubles
Asia Team Championships
Gold medal – first place	2026 Qingdao	Women's team
Silver medal – second place	2020 Manila	Women's team
World Junior Championships
Gold medal – first place	2013 Bangkok	Mixed team
Asian Junior Championships
Silver medal – second place	2014 Taipei	Mixed team
Silver medal – second place	2014 Taipei	Mixed doubles

Kong Hee-yong (Korean: 공희용; born 11 December 1996) is a South Korean badminton player. In 2013, she won the mixed team gold at the BWF World Junior Championships. In 2014, Kong who was educated at the Daesung girls' high school competed at the Asian Junior Championships and won the silver medals in the mixed team and doubles event. She also play for the Jeonbuk Bank at the national event, and at the 2017 Japan Open, she became the runner-up in the women's doubles event partnered with Kim Ha-na. Together with Kim So-yeong, she was awarded as the 2019 BWF Most Improved Player of the Year. Kong competed for South Korea at the 2020 and 2024 Summer Olympics.

== Achievements ==
=== Olympic Games ===
Women's doubles
Year	Venue	Partner	Opponent	Score	Result
2020	Musashino Forest Sport Plaza, Tokyo, Japan	(South Korea) Kim So-yeong	(South Korea) Lee So-hee (South Korea) Shin Seung-chan	21–10, 21–17	Bronze

=== World Championships ===
Women's doubles
Year	Venue	Partner	Opponent	Score	Result
2021	Palacio de los Deportes Carolina Marín, Huelva, Spain	(South Korea) Kim So-yeong	(South Korea) Lee So-hee (South Korea) Shin Seung-chan	18–21, 17–21	Bronze
2022	Tokyo Metropolitan Gymnasium, Tokyo, Japan	(South Korea) Kim So-yeong	(China) Chen Qingchen (China) Jia Yifan	20–22, 14–21	Silver
2023	Royal Arena, Copenhagen, Denmark	(South Korea) Kim So-yeong	(Indonesia) Apriyani Rahayu (Indonesia) Siti Fadia Silva Ramadhanti	9–21, 20–22	Bronze

=== Asian Games ===
Women's doubles
Year	Venue	Partner	Opponent	Score	Result
2022	Binjiang Gymnasium, Hangzhou, China	(South Korea) Kim So-yeong	(China) Chen Qingchen (China) Jia Yifan	21–16, 9–21, 12–21	Bronze

=== Asian Championships ===
Women's doubles
Year	Venue	Partner	Opponent	Score	Result
2018	Wuhan Sports Center Gymnasium, Wuhan, China	(South Korea) Kim So-yeong	(Japan) Misaki Matsutomo (Japan) Ayaka Takahashi	17–21, 22–20, 14–21	Bronze

=== Asian Junior Championships ===
Mixed doubles
Year	Venue	Partner	Opponent	Score	Result
2014	Taipei Gymnasium, Taipei, Taiwan	(South Korea) Kim Jung-ho	(China) Huang Kaixiang (China) Chen Qingchen	14–21, 13–21	Silver

=== BWF World Tour (17 titles, 10 runners-up) ===
The BWF World Tour, which was announced on 19 March 2017 and implemented in 2018, is a series of elite badminton tournaments sanctioned by the Badminton World Federation (BWF). The BWF World Tour is divided into levels of World Tour Finals, Super 1000, Super 750, Super 500, Super 300, and the BWF Tour Super 100.

Women's doubles
Year	Tournament	Level	Partner	Opponent	Score	Result
2019	Indonesia Masters	Super 500	(South Korea) Kim So-yeong	(Japan) Misaki Matsutomo (Japan) Ayaka Takahashi	19–21, 15–21	(silver) Runner-up
2019	Spain Masters	Super 300	(South Korea) Kim So-yeong	(Japan) Nami Matsuyama (Japan) Chiharu Shida	23–21, 15–21, 21–17	(gold) Winner
2019	Singapore Open	Super 500	(South Korea) Kim Hye-jeong	(Japan) Mayu Matsumoto (Japan) Wakana Nagahara	17–21, 20–22	(silver) Runner-up
2019	New Zealand Open	Super 300	(South Korea) Kim So-yeong	(Japan) Misaki Matsutomo (Japan) Ayaka Takahashi	21–15, 21–18	(gold) Winner
2019	Japan Open	Super 750	(South Korea) Kim So-yeong	(Japan) Mayu Matsumoto (Japan) Wakana Nagahara	21–12, 21–12	(gold) Winner
2019	Chinese Taipei Open	Super 300	(South Korea) Kim So-yeong	(Thailand) Jongkolphan Kititharakul (Thailand) Rawinda Prajongjai	19–21, 21–18, 26–28	(silver) Runner-up
2019	Korea Open	Super 500	(South Korea) Kim So-yeong	(South Korea) Lee So-hee (South Korea) Shin Seung-chan	13–21, 21–19, 21–17	(gold) Winner
2019	French Open	Super 750	(South Korea) Kim So-yeong	(South Korea) Lee So-hee (South Korea) Shin Seung-chan	21–16, 19–21, 12–21	(silver) Runner-up
2020 (II)	Thailand Open	Super 1000	(South Korea) Kim So-yeong	(South Korea) Lee So-hee (South Korea) Shin Seung-chan	21–18, 21–19	(gold) Winner
2020	BWF World Tour Finals	World Tour Finals	(South Korea) Kim So-yeong	(South Korea) Lee So-hee (South Korea) Shin Seung-chan	21–15, 24–26, 19–21	(silver) Runner-up
2021	French Open	Super 750	(South Korea) Kim So-yeong	(South Korea) Lee So-hee (South Korea) Shin Seung-chan	17–21, 12–21	(silver) Runner-up
2021	BWF World Tour Finals	World Tour Finals	(South Korea) Kim So-yeong	(Japan) Nami Matsuyama (Japan) Chiharu Shida	21–14, 21–14	(gold) Winner
2022	Korea Masters	Super 300	(South Korea) Kim So-yeong	(South Korea) Baek Ha-na (South Korea) Lee Yu-rim	21–17, 21–12	(gold) Winner
2023	All England Open	Super 1000	(South Korea) Kim So-yeong	(South Korea) Baek Ha-na (South Korea) Lee So-hee	21–5, 21–12	(gold) Winner
2023	Thailand Open	Super 500	(South Korea) Kim So-yeong	(Thailand) Benyapa Aimsaard (Thailand) Nuntakarn Aimsaard	21–13, 21–17	(gold) Winner
2023	Korea Open	Super 500	(South Korea) Kim So-yeong	(China) Chen Qingchen (China) Jia Yifan	10–21, 21–17, 7–21	(silver) Runner-up
2023	Japan Open	Super 750	(South Korea) Kim So-yeong	(China) Chen Qingchen (China) Jia Yifan	21–17, 21–14	(gold) Winner
2023	Australian Open	Super 500	(South Korea) Kim So-yeong	(China) Liu Shengshu (China) Tan Ning	21–18, 21–16	(gold) Winner
2024	Korea Masters	Super 300	(South Korea) Kim Hye-jeong	(China) Li Yijing (China) Luo Xumin	21–14, 16–21, 21–18	(gold) Winner
2025	India Open	Super 750	(South Korea) Kim Hye-jeong	(Japan) Arisa Igarashi (Japan) Ayako Sakuramoto	15–21, 13–21	(silver) Runner-up
2025	Indonesia Masters	Super 500	(South Korea) Kim Hye-jeong	(Malaysia) Pearly Tan (Malaysia) Thinaah Muralitharan	21–12, 17–21, 21–18	(gold) Winner
2025	Orléans Masters	Super 300	(South Korea) Kim Hye-jeong	(South Korea) Baek Ha-na (South Korea) Lee So-hee	21–18, 23–21	(gold) Winner
2025	Singapore Open	Super 750	(South Korea) Kim Hye-jeong	(Japan) Rin Iwanaga (Japan) Kie Nakanishi	21–16, 21–14	(gold) Winner
2025	China Masters	Super 750	(South Korea) Kim Hye-jeong	(China) Jia Yifan (China) Zhang Shuxian	19–21, 21–16, 13–21	(silver) Runner-up
2025	Korea Open	Super 500	(South Korea) Kim Hye-jeong	(Japan) Rin Iwanaga (Japan) Kie Nakanishi	21–19, 21–12	(gold) Winner
2025	Denmark Open	Super 750	(South Korea) Kim Hye-jeong	(South Korea) Baek Ha-na (South Korea) Lee So-hee	21–15, 14–21, 15–21	(silver) Runner-up
2026	Japan Open	Super 750	(South Korea) Kim Hye-jeong	(China) Jia Yifan (China) Zhang Shuxian	14–21, 21–15, 30–29	(gold) Winner

=== BWF Superseries (1 runner-up) ===
The BWF Superseries, which was launched on 14 December 2006 and implemented in 2007, was a series of elite badminton tournaments, sanctioned by the Badminton World Federation (BWF). BWF Superseries levels were Superseries and Superseries Premier. A season of Superseries consisted of twelve tournaments around the world that had been introduced since 2011. Successful players were invited to the Superseries Finals, which were held at the end of each year.

Women's doubles
Year	Tournament	Partner	Opponent	Score	Result
2017	Japan Open	(South Korea) Kim Ha-na	(Japan) Misaki Matsutomo (Japan) Ayaka Takahashi	18–21, 16–21	(silver) Runner-up

BWF Super Series tournament

=== BWF Grand Prix (1 runner-up) ===
The BWF Grand Prix had two levels, the Grand Prix and Grand Prix Gold. It was a series of badminton tournaments sanctioned by the Badminton World Federation (BWF) and played between 2007 and 2017.

Women's doubles
Year	Tournament	Partner	Opponent	Score	Result
2017	Korea Masters	(South Korea) Kim So-yeong	(South Korea) Lee So-hee (South Korea) Shin Seung-chan	18–21, 21–23	(silver) Runner-up

BWF Grand Prix Gold tournament

=== BWF International Challenge/Series (2 runners-up) ===
Mixed doubles
Year	Tournament	Partner	Opponent	Score	Result
2015	Indonesia International	(South Korea) Chung Eui-seok	(Indonesia) Fran Kurniawan (Indonesia) Komala Dewi	12–21, 21–16, 13–21	(silver) Runner-up
2017	Osaka International	(South Korea) Park Kyung-hoon	(China) Wang Sijie (China) Ni Bowen	21–18, 16–21, 12–21	(silver) Runner-up

BWF International Challenge tournament
