= 2016 BWF World Junior Championships – Mixed doubles =

2016 BWF World Junior Championships Mixed doubles
Tournament details
- Dates: 8 November 2016 – 13 November 2016
- Edition: 18th
- Level: International
- Venue: Bilbao Arena
- Location: Bilbao

The Mixed Doubles tournament of the 2016 BWF World Junior Championships is a badminton world junior individual championships for the Eye Level Cups, held on November 8–13. The defending champion of the last edition is Zheng Siwei / Chen Qingchen from China. He Jiting and Du Yue of China won the gold medal in this event.

== Seeded ==
1. (China) He Jiting / Du Yue (champion)
2. (Indonesia) Rinov Rivaldy / Apriani Rahayu (quarterfinals)
3. (Japan) Hiroki Okamura / Nami Matsuyama (quarterfinals)
4. (Thailand) Pakin Kuna-anuvit / Kwanchanok Sudjaipraparat (third round)
5. (Poland) Paweł Śmiłowski / Magdalena Świerczyńska (second round)
6. (Russia) Rodion Alimov / Alina Davletova (fifth round)
7. (China) Zhou Haodong / Hu Yuxiang (finals)
8. (Slovenia) Miha Ivanič / Nika Arih (third round)
9. (Indonesia) Amri Syahnawi / Vania Arianti Sukoco (quarterfinals)
10. (China) Zhu Junhao / Zhou Chaomin (fifth round)
11. (Thailand) Pacharapol Nipornram / Ruethaichanok Laisuan (fifth round)
12. (Indonesia) Andika Ramadiansyah / Angelica Wiratama (fourth round)
13. (Poland) Robert Cybulski / Wiktoria Dąbczyńska (second round)
14. (Hong Kong) Chan Yin Chak / Ng Tsz Yau (fifth round)
15. (Slovenia) Miha Ivančič / Petra Polanc (third round)
16. (Malaysia) Chen Tang Jie / Toh Ee Wei (semifinals)

== Draw ==
=== Finals ===
Fifth round
1	(China) He Jiting (China) Du Yue	21	21
(South Korea) Lim Su-min (South Korea) Kim Hyang-im	14	18
(Turkey) Yazgan Çalışır (Turkey) Kader İnal	17	15
9	(Indonesia) Amri Syahnawi (Indonesia) Vania Arianti Sukoco	21	21
(Japan) Mahiro Kaneko (Japan) Minami Kawashima	12	23	17
(India) Satwiksairaj Rankireddy (India) Kuhoo Garg	21	21	21
6	(Russia) Rodion Alimov (Russia) Alina Davletova	21	15	21
16	(Malaysia) Chen Tang Jie (Malaysia) Toh Ee Wei	15	21	23
14	(Hong Kong) Chan Yin Chak (Hong Kong) Ng Tsz Yau	13	14
7	(China) Zhou Haodong (China) Hu Yuxiang	21	21
(Chinese Taipei) Su Li-wei (Chinese Taipei) Jhou Shih-jyun	17	14
3	(Japan) Hiroki Okamura (Japan) Nami Matsuyama	21	21
10	(China) Zhu Junhao (China) Zhou Chaomin	16	18
(South Korea) Park Kyung-hoon (South Korea) Kim Hye-jeong	21	21
11	(Thailand) Pacharapol Nipornram (Thailand) Ruethaichanok Laisuan	21	11	17
2	(Indonesia) Rinov Rivaldy (Indonesia) Apriani Rahayu	18	21	21

Quarterfinals
1	(China) He Jiting (China) Du Yue	21	21
9	(Indonesia) Amri Syahnawi (Indonesia) Vania Arianti Sukoco	11	11
(India) Satwiksairaj Rankireddy (India) Kuhoo Garg	21	12	19
16	(Malaysia) Chen Tang Jie (Malaysia) Toh Ee Wei	13	21	21
7	(China) Zhou Haodong (China) Hu Yuxiang	21	19	22
3	(Japan) Hiroki Okamura (Japan) Nami Matsuyama	14	21	20
(South Korea) Park Kyung-hoon (South Korea) Kim Hye-jeong	21	15	21
2	(Indonesia) Rinov Rivaldy (Indonesia) Apriani Rahayu	18	21	14

Semifinals
1	(China) He Jiting (China) Du Yue	21	21
16	(Malaysia) Chen Tang Jie (Malaysia) Toh Ee Wei	14	11
7	(China) Zhou Haodong (China) Hu Yuxiang	21	21
(South Korea) Park Kyung-hoon (South Korea) Kim Hye-jeong	17	18

Finals
1	(China) He Jiting (China) Du Yue	21	21
7	(China) Zhou Haodong (China) Hu Yuxiang	13	15

=== Top half ===
==== Section 1 ====
First round

Second round
1	(China) He JT (China) Du Y	21	21
(New Zealand) E Lau (New Zealand) T Otene	7	14
(Estonia) M Kaart (Estonia) H Piho	21	21
(Lithuania) J Petkus (Lithuania) E Beržanskytė	9	12
(Czech Republic) J Somerlík (Czech Republic) M Fuchsová	16	13
(Canada) J A Ho-Shue (Canada) Q Ouyang	21	21
(Singapore) J L Lee (Singapore) K Koh	21	15	21
(Hungary) B Szenjai (Hungary) A Karsai	10	21	8

Third round
1	(China) He JT (China) Du Y	21	21
(Estonia) M Kaart (Estonia) H Piho	4	6
(Canada) J A Ho-Shue (Canada) Q Ouyang	21	21
(Singapore) J L Lee (Singapore) K Koh	12	12

Fourth round
1	(China) He JT (China) Du Y	21	21
(Canada) J A Ho-Shue (Canada) Q Ouyang	17	11

==== Section 2 ====
First round
(France) T Gicquel (France) D Delrue	21	12	21
(Japan) S Nihei (Japan) S Hobara	16	21	18

Second round
13	(Poland) R Cybulski (Poland) W Dąbczyńska	12	11
(Chinese Taipei) Ye H-w (Chinese Taipei) Hu L-f	21	21
(South Korea) Lim S-m (South Korea) Kim H-i	21	21
(Denmark) M Muurholm (Denmark) F Ravn	13	13
(Sri Lanka) S Mohamed (Sri Lanka) L Hettiarachchi	13	10
(France) E Adam (France) V Hériau	21	21
(Romania) F Gisca (Romania) M A Dutu	10	8
(France) T Gicquel (France) D Delrue	21	21

Third round
(Chinese Taipei) Ye H-w (Chinese Taipei) Hu L-f	12	21	13
(South Korea) Lim S-m (South Korea) Kim H-i	21	18	21
(France) E Adam (France) V Hériau	18	19
(France) T Gicquel (France) D Delrue	21	21

Fourth round
(South Korea) Lim S-m (South Korea) Kim H-i	24	17	21
(France) T Gicquel (France) D Delrue	22	21	12

==== Section 3 ====
First round

Second round
8	(Slovenia) M Ivanič (Slovenia) N Arih	21	13	21
(United States) V Chiu (United States) J Hsu	19	21	18
(Portugal) C A Silva (Portugal) A F. Gonçalves	10	7
(England) C Hemming (England) F T Liew	21	21
(Sri Lanka) T Rahubadda (Sri Lanka) K Gunarathne	13	18
(Australia) J Schueler (Australia) T Ho	21	21
(South Africa) D K Schaap (South Africa) C Haasbroek	12	8
(Turkey) Y Çalışır (Turkey) K İnal	21	21

Third round
8	(Slovenia) M Ivanič (Slovenia) N Arih	15	21	16
(England) C Hemming (England) F T Liew	21	19	21
(Australia) J Schueler (Australia) T Ho	19	16
(Turkey) Y Çalışır (Turkey) K İnal	21	21

Fourth round
(England) C Hemming (England) F T Liew	22	29
(Turkey) Y Çalışır (Turkey) K İnal	24	30

==== Section 4 ====
First round
(Moldova) V Leadavschi (Moldova) V Gynga	21	21
(South Africa) B Nel (South Africa) T Jacobs	13	9

Second round
9	(Indonesia) A Syahnawi (Indonesia) V A Sukoco	21	21
(Norway) M Marum (Norway) C Dahl Nielsen	10	15
(Peru) D Mini (Peru) P la Torre Regal	21	15	21
(Macau) Pui P F (Macau) Gong X X	19	21	17
(Germany) J C Völker (Germany) J Petrikowski	17	15
(Hong Kong) Lam W L (Hong Kong) Yeung N T	21	21
(Norway) B Nordén (Norway) E F Storvik	16	12
(Moldova) V Leadavschi (Moldova) V Gynga	21	21

Third round
9	(Indonesia) A Syahnawi (Indonesia) V A Sukoco	21	21
(Peru) D Mini (Peru) P la Torre Regal	13	11
(Hong Kong) Lam W L (Hong Kong) Yeung N T	21	21
(Moldova) V Leadavschi (Moldova) V Gynga	13	8

Fourth round
9	(Indonesia) A Syahnawi (Indonesia) V A Sukoco	19	21	21
(Hong Kong) Lam W L (Hong Kong) Yeung N T	21	15	11

==== Section 5 ====
First round

Second round
4	(Thailand) P Kuna-anuvit (Thailand) K Sudjaipraparat	21	21
(Netherlands) T van der Lecq (Netherlands) A Tirtosentono	13	16
(Denmark) R Kjær (Denmark) I A Andersen	15	11
(Japan) M Kaneko (Japan) M Kawashima	21	21
(Italy) G Toti (Italy) S Garino	20	13
(Australia) T Tan (Australia) V He	22	21
(Belgium) E Bracke (Belgium) L Jaques	19	22	21
(Russia) E Kurdyukov (Russia) O Rogova	21	20	19

Third round
4	(Thailand) P Kuna-anuvit (Thailand) K Sudjaipraparat	21	9
(Japan) M Kaneko (Japan) M Kawashima	23	21
(Australia) T Tan (Australia) V He	9	15
(Belgium) E Bracke (Belgium) L Jaques	21	21

Fourth round
(Japan) M Kaneko (Japan) M Kawashima	21	21
(Belgium) E Bracke (Belgium) L Jaques	16	18

==== Section 6 ====
First round
(Indonesia) A R Kasturo (Indonesia) Y Barkah	14	21	21
(Ukraine) O Shmundyak (Ukraine) A Prozorova	21	13	12

Second round
12	(Indonesia) A Ramadiansyah (Indonesia) A Wiratama	21	21
(Ukraine) V Rozhkov (Ukraine) V Rudakova	10	12
(Mongolia) T Boldbaatar (Mongolia) O Amartaivan	5	7
(New Zealand) C Steeghs (New Zealand) S Fu	21	21
(India) S Rankireddy (India) K Garg	21	21
(Malaysia) A Ameer (Malaysia) P Tan	17	15
(Georgia (country)) G Nalgranyan (Georgia (country)) M Khachaturyan	6	8
(Indonesia) A R Kasturo (Indonesia) Y Barkah	21	21

Third round
12	(Indonesia) A Ramadiansyah (Indonesia) A Wiratama	21	21
(New Zealand) C Steeghs (New Zealand) S Fu	17	7
(India) S Rankireddy (India) K Garg	21	15	21
(Indonesia) A R Kasturo (Indonesia) Y Barkah	19	21	16

Fourth round
12	(Indonesia) A Ramadiansyah (Indonesia) A Wiratama	19	21	14
(India) S Rankireddy (India) K Garg	21	15	21

==== Section 7 ====
First round
(Sweden) C Harrbacka (Sweden) T Sjöö	16	22	17
(Scotland) A Dunn (Scotland) E O'Donnell	21	20	21

Second round
6	(Russia) R Alimov (Russia) A Davletova	21	21
(Algeria) Y Balahouane (Algeria) S Ibrahim	10	10
(Spain) M Pousa (Spain) L Santos	21	21
(Portugal) M Jorge (Portugal) M Leite	18	14
(Chinese Taipei) Lu C (Chinese Taipei) Lee C-c	21	21
(Mexico) L Montoya (Mexico) N Márquez	7	8
(Hungary) G Pytel (Hungary) V Sándorházi	12	16
(Scotland) A Dunn (Scotland) E O'Donnell	21	21

Third round
6	(Russia) R Alimov (Russia) A Davletova	21	21
(Spain) M Pousa (Spain) L Santos	10	8
(Chinese Taipei) Lu C (Chinese Taipei) Lee C-c	21	24
(Scotland) A Dunn (Scotland) E O'Donnell	16	22

Fourth round
6	(Russia) R Alimov (Russia) A Davletova	21	21
(Chinese Taipei) Lu C (Chinese Taipei) Lee C-c	19	19

==== Section 8 ====
First round
(Slovenia) T Zalar (Slovenia) N Stovanje	21	21
(Iceland) A Tómasson (Iceland) Þ Eylands	8	16

Second round
16	(Malaysia) Chen T J (Malaysia) Toh E W	21	21
(Vietnam) Lê D P (Vietnam) Trần T P T	9	9
(Finland) J Övermark (Finland) I Suutarinen	21	21
(Costa Rica) Z A Zheng Chen (Costa Rica) L Villalobos	11	10
(Hong Kong) Ko S H (Hong Kong) Yeung S Y	21	21
(Latvia) K Kalniņš (Latvia) L Lenceviča	7	9
(Slovakia) R Šmatlák (Slovakia) M Tarcalová	16	25	21
(Slovenia) T Zalar (Slovenia) N Stovanje	21	23	12

Third round
16	(Malaysia) Chen T J (Malaysia) Toh E W	21	21
(Finland) J Övermark (Finland) I Suutarinen	16	15
(Hong Kong) Ko S H (Hong Kong) Yeung S Y	21	21
(Slovakia) R Šmatlák (Slovakia) M Tarcalová	7	8

Fourth round
16	(Malaysia) Chen T J (Malaysia) Toh E W	21	21
(Hong Kong) Ko S H (Hong Kong) Yeung S Y	16	13

=== Bottom half ===
==== Section 9 ====
First round
(France) S Corvée (France) L Huet	21	21
(Scotland) C Grimley (Scotland) C Torrance	13	12

Second round
(France) S Corvée (France) L Huet	21	21
(Hong Kong) Chow H L (Hong Kong) Leung Y Y	13	18
(Japan) Y Kubota (Japan) N Sone	21	21
(Romania) D Popescu (Romania) A Olariu	7	11
(Singapore) A Kwek (Singapore) C Wong	21	21
(South Africa) R Snyman (South Africa) Z van der Merwe	6	6
(Estonia) K Kert (Estonia) L Tannik
14	(Hong Kong) Chan Y C (Hong Kong) Ng T Y	w	/	o

Third round
(France) S Corvée (France) L Huet	21	16
(Japan) Y Kubota (Japan) N Sone	23	21
(Singapore) A Kwek (Singapore) C Wong	9	15
14	(Hong Kong) Chan Y C (Hong Kong) Ng T Y	21	21

Fourth round
(Japan) Y Kubota (Japan) N Sone	11	15
14	(Hong Kong) Chan Y C (Hong Kong) Ng T Y	21	21

==== Section 10 ====
First round
(Latvia) N Podosinoviks (Latvia) U Berga	18	12
(Czech Republic) P Beran (Czech Republic) B Ausbergerová	21	21

Second round
(Czech Republic) P Beran (Czech Republic) B Ausbergerová	21	21
(Mexico) J Barajas (Mexico) A Quiñones	6	12
(Mongolia) G Enkhjargal (Mongolia) K Darkhanbaatar	4	11
(New Zealand) D Vong (New Zealand) E Calder-Hawkins	21	21
(Moldova) V Izbas (Moldova) E-A Diordiev	w	/	o
(Algeria) S Larbaoui (Algeria) H Bouksani
(England) M Flynn (England) L Tolman
7	(China) Zhou HD (China) Hu YX	w	/	o

Third round
(Czech Republic) P Beran (Czech Republic) B Ausbergerová	21	10	21
(New Zealand) D Vong (New Zealand) E Calder-Hawkins	17	21	17
(Moldova) V Izbas (Moldova) E-A Diordiev	6	6
7	(China) Zhou HD (China) Hu YX	21	21

Fourth round
(Czech Republic) P Beran (Czech Republic) B Ausbergerová	12	6
7	(China) Zhou HD (China) Hu YX	21	21

==== Section 11 ====
First round
(Hungary) B Pápai (Hungary) R Madarász	8	19
(Iceland) D B Björnsson (Iceland) A K Jónsdóttir	21	21

Second round
(Iceland) D B Björnsson (Iceland) A K Jónsdóttir	12	12
(India) D. C Kumar (India) P. S Sai	21	21
(Macau) Leong I C (Macau) Ng W C	21	21
(Slovakia) P Hrnčár (Slovakia) T Prostináková	16	17
(Chinese Taipei) Su L-w (Chinese Taipei) Jhou S-j	21	21
(Lithuania) P Bertašius (Lithuania) G Paškevičiūtė	11	2
(Lithuania) M Šames (Lithuania) A Blandytė	10	9
15	(Slovenia) M Ivančič (Slovenia) P Polanc	21	21

Third round
(India) D. C Kumar (India) P. S Sai	21	21
(Macau) Leong I C (Macau) Ng W C	14	12
(Chinese Taipei) Su L-w (Chinese Taipei) Jhou S-j	21	21
15	(Slovenia) M Ivančič (Slovenia) P Polanc	18	18

Fourth round
(India) D. C Kumar (India) P. S Sai	16	10
(Chinese Taipei) Su L-w (Chinese Taipei) Jhou S-j	21	21

==== Section 12 ====
First round

Second round
(Denmark) D Lundgaard (Denmark) A Magelund	21	21
(Peru) D S Tokumura (Peru) M Flores	12	11
(Slovakia) A Horák (Slovakia) Z Palková	16	12
(Chinese Taipei) Lin S-c (Chinese Taipei) Lin H-t	21	21
(Germany) D Hess (Germany) E Moszczynski	21	21
(United States) C Yeo (United States) J Gai	13	14
(Canada) N Nguyen (Canada) A Mocanu	8	19
3	(Japan) H Okamura (Japan) N Matsuyama	21	21

Third round
(Denmark) D Lundgaard (Denmark) A Magelund	21	12	23
(Chinese Taipei) Lin S-c (Chinese Taipei) Lin H-t	19	21	21
(Germany) D Hess (Germany) E Moszczynski	10	9
3	(Japan) H Okamura (Japan) N Matsuyama	21	21

Fourth round
(Denmark) D Lundgaard (Denmark) A Magelund	22	15
3	(Japan) H Okamura (Japan) N Matsuyama	24	21

==== Section 13 ====
First round
(Scotland) M Grimley (Scotland) T Woods	11	9
(Canada) B Yang (Canada) K Ho-Shue	21	21

Second round
(Canada) B Yang (Canada) K Ho-Shue	21	21
(Poland) M Kikosicki (Poland) A Goszczyńska	14	19
(England) Z Russ (England) G King	21	21
(Australia) H Tang (Australia) J Son	18	16
(Netherlands) J Kweekel (Netherlands) I van der Aar	21	21
(India) D Kapila (India) U K Mithula	18	14
(Finland) J Paul (Finland) P Lindberg	10	9
10	(China) Zhu JH (China) Zhou CM	21	21

Third round
(Canada) B Yang (Canada) K Ho-Shue	21	21
(England) Z Russ (England) G King	15	9
(Netherlands) J Kweekel (Netherlands) I van der Aar	18	19
10	(China) Zhu JH (China) Zhou CM	21	21

Fourth round
(Canada) B Yang (Canada) K Ho-Shue	16	22
10	(China) Zhu JH (China) Zhou CM	21	24

==== Section 14 ====
First round

Second round
(Spain) A Alcalá (Spain) C Poy	6	8
(South Korea) Kim W-h (South Korea) Lee Y-r	21	21
(Algeria) S Khaldi (Algeria) L Mazri	11	10
(Estonia) M Lõo (Estonia) K Marran	21	21
(Belgium) G Bonnet (Belgium) C Lassaux	13	9
(Russia) E Okolov (Russia) A Semenova	21	21
(South Korea) Park K-h (South Korea) Kim H-j	21	21
5	(Poland) P Śmiłowski (Poland) M Świerczyńska	14	17

Third round
(South Korea) Kim W-h (South Korea) Lee Y-r	21	21
(Estonia) M Lõo (Estonia) K Marran	5	8
(Russia) E Okolov (Russia) A Semenova	17	13
(South Korea) Park K-h (South Korea) Kim H-j	21	21

Fourth round
(South Korea) Kim W-h (South Korea) Lee Y-r	18	13
(South Korea) Park K-h (South Korea) Kim H-j	21	21

==== Section 15 ====
First round
(Portugal) M Rocha (Portugal) M Chang	21	20	22
(Norway) O H Imset (Norway) M Christensen	14	22	20

Second round
(Portugal) M Rocha (Portugal) M Chang	21	21
(Belarus) D Kuzmitski (Belarus) Y Zaharova	18	13
(Finland) J Puro (Finland) H-L Lindberg	21	21
(Georgia (country)) L Ninoshvili (Georgia (country)) T Batiashvili	8	7
(Czech Republic) O Král (Czech Republic) M Světničková	21	21
(Sri Lanka) T H P Gonapinuwala (Sri Lanka) H Wijayarathne	8	6
(Peru) B Barrueto Deza (Peru) F Saponara Rivva	8	17
11	(Thailand) P Nipornram (Thailand) R Laisuan	21	21

Third round
(Portugal) M Rocha (Portugal) M Chang	21	21
(Finland) J Puro (Finland) H-L Lindberg	10	11
(Czech Republic) O Král (Czech Republic) M Světničková	10	8
11	(Thailand) P Nipornram (Thailand) R Laisuan	21	21

Fourth round
(Portugal) M Rocha (Portugal) M Chang	6	9
11	(Thailand) P Nipornram (Thailand) R Laisuan	21	21

==== Section 16 ====
First round

Second round
(Spain) A Rodríguez (Spain) E Andreu	20	21	14
(Singapore) M E W Tan (Singapore) N I Khan	22	14	21
(China) Han CK (China) Ni BW	21	21
(Germany) H Graalmann (Germany) A Schreiber	12	13
(Ukraine) D Bosniuk (Ukraine) M Ilyinskaya	21	21
(Costa Rica) E Hurtado Rojas (Costa Rica) A Martinez Vega	6	3
(Malaysia) Hoo P R (Malaysia) Tan S J	18	21	25
2	(Indonesia) R Rivaldy (Indonesia) A Rahayu	21	19	27

Third round
(Singapore) M E W Tan (Singapore) N I Khan	8	6
(China) Han CK (China) Ni BW	21	21
(Ukraine) D Bosniuk (Ukraine) M Ilyinskaya	9	9
2	(Indonesia) R Rivaldy (Indonesia) A Rahayu	21	21

Fourth round
(China) Han CK (China) Ni BW	17	21	19
2	(Indonesia) R Rivaldy (Indonesia) A Rahayu	21	19	21
