= 2019 Syed Modi International =

2019 badminton tournament in Lucknow

Tournament details
- Dates: 26 November – 1 December
- Level: Super 300
- Total prize money: US$150,000
- Venue: Babu Banarasi Das Indoor Stadium
- Location: Lucknow, India

Champions
- Men's singles: (Chinese Taipei) Wang Tzu-wei
- Women's singles: (Spain) Carolina Marín
- Men's doubles: (China) He Jiting (China) Tan Qiang
- Women's doubles: (South Korea) Baek Ha-na (South Korea) Jung Kyung-eun
- Mixed doubles: (Russia) Rodion Alimov (Russia) Alina Davletova

The 2019 Syed Modi International Badminton Championships (officially known as the Ecogreen Syed Modi International Badminton Championships 2019 for sponsorship reasons) was a badminton tournament which took place at the Babu Banarasi Das Indoor Stadium in Lucknow, India, from 26 November to 1 December 2019 and had a total prize of $150,000.

== Tournament ==
The 2019 Syed Modi International was the twenty-sixth and last tournament of the 2019 BWF World Tour before the 2019 BWF World Tour Finals. However, this tournament was not calculated in the rankings used as qualification for the World Tour Finals. It was part of the Syed Modi International Badminton Championships, which had been held since 1991. It was organized by Badminton Association of India and sanctioned by the BWF.

=== Venue ===
This international tournament was held at the Babu Banarasi Das Indoor Stadium in Lucknow, Uttar Pradesh, India.

=== Point distribution ===
Below is the point distribution for each phase of the tournament based on the BWF points system for the BWF World Tour Super 300 event.

Winner	Runner-up	3/4	5/8	9/16	17/32	33/64	65/128
7,000	5,950	4,900	3,850	2,750	1,670	660	320

=== Prize money ===
The total prize money for this tournament was US$150,000. Distribution of prize money was in accordance with BWF regulations.

Event	Winner	Finals	Semi-finals	Quarter-finals	Last 16
Singles	$11,250	$5,700	$2,175	$900	$525
Doubles	$11,850	$5,700	$2,100	$1,087.50	$562.50

== Men's singles ==
=== Seeds ===
1. (China) Shi Yuqi (first round)
2. (Hong Kong) Ng Ka Long (withdrew)
3. (India) Srikanth Kidambi (quarter-finals)
4. (India) B. Sai Praneeth (second round)
5. (India) Sameer Verma (first round)
6. (China) Lu Guangzu (withdrew)
7. (South Korea) Son Wan-ho (semi-finals)
8. (Chinese Taipei) Wang Tzu-wei (champion)

=== Finals ===
Semi-finals
8	(Chinese Taipei) Wang Tzu-wei	21	21
7	(South Korea) Son Wan-ho	9	7
(India) Sourabh Verma	21	16	21
(South Korea) Heo Kwang-hee	17	21	18

Final
8	(Chinese Taipei) Wang Tzu-wei	21	21
(India) Sourabh Verma	15	17

=== Top half ===
==== Section 1 ====
First Round
1	(China) Shi YQ	23	17
(Malaysia) Soo T Z	25	21
PFQ	(India) S P Singh	22	18	7
(Canada) B. R. Sankeerth	20	21	21
8	(Chinese Taipei) Wang T-w	21	21
(Thailand) T Saensomboonsuk	16	15
(China) Li SF	21	20	13
(India) Prannoy K	18	22	21

Second Round
(Malaysia) Soo T Z	21	21
(Canada) B. R. Sankeerth	9	11
8	(Chinese Taipei) Wang T-w	14	21	21
(India) Prannoy K	21	10	14

Quarter-finals
(Malaysia) Soo T Z	19	12
8	(Chinese Taipei) Wang T-w	21	21

==== Section 2 ====
First Round
3	(India) S Kidambi	21	21
(Russia) V Malkov	12	11
(India) P Kashyap	w	/	o
(France) L Corvee
7	(South Korea) Son W-h	21	21
Q3	(India) A Yadav	12	16
(France) T Rouxel
(India) L Sen	w	/	o

Second Round
3	(India) S Kidambi	18	22	21
(India) P Kashyap	21	20	16
7	(South Korea) Son W-h	21	21
(India) L Sen	14	17

Quarter-finals
3	(India) S Kidambi	18	19
7	(South Korea) Son W-h	21	21

=== Bottom half ===
==== Section 3 ====
First Round
PFQ	(Canada) X Sheng	11	16
(India) So Verma	21	21
Q2	(India) A Mishra	21	21
PFQ	(Mauritius) G Paul	16	16
(Thailand) K Vitidsarn	21	21
Q1	(India) R Y Chittaboina	16	8
(Malaysia) I Zulkarnain	16	20
4	(India) B. Sai Praneeth	21	22

Second Round
(India) So Verma	21	21
Q2	(India) A Mishra	11	18
(Thailand) K Vitidsarn	21	21
4	(India) B. Sai Praneeth	11	17

Quarter-finals
(India) So Verma	21	21
(Thailand) K Vitidsarn	19	16

==== Section 4 ====
First Round
(China) Zhao JP	21	21
(Republic of Ireland) N Nguyen	9	16
(India) A Jayaram	15	21	21
5	(India) Sa Verma	21	18	13
(South Korea) Heo K-h	21	21
(Germany) K Schäfer	19	12
Q4	(Chinese Taipei) Huang P-h	21	15	3
PFQ	(India) Si Verma	12	21	21

Second Round
(China) Zhao JP	21	14	30
(India) A Jayaram	18	21	28
(South Korea) Heo K-h	21	24
PFQ	(India) Si Verma	9	22

Quarter-finals
(China) Zhao JP	14	21	14
(South Korea) Heo K-h	21	19	21

== Women's singles ==
=== Seeds ===
1. (China) He Bingjiao (withdrew)
2. (Canada) Michelle Li (withdrew)
3. (India) Saina Nehwal (withdrew)
4. (Spain) Carolina Marín (champion)
5. (South Korea) An Se-young (second round)
6. (China) Han Yue (withdrew)
7. (Thailand) Pornpawee Chochuwong (first round)
8. (China) Cai Yanyan (withdrew)

=== Finals ===
Semi-finals
(South Korea) Kim Ga-eun	20	16
4	(Spain) Carolina Marín	22	21
(Thailand) Phittayaporn Chaiwan	24	21
Q4	(India) Rituparna Das	22	15

Final
4	(Spain) Carolina Marín	21	21
(Thailand) Phittayaporn Chaiwan	12	16

=== Top half ===
==== Section 1 ====
First Round
PFQ	(United States) C Pan	13	12
(South Korea) Kim H-m	21	21
Q1	(India) A Chaliha	21	21
PFQ	(India) V Gummadi	16	16
5	(South Korea) An S-y	21	21
(Israel) K Polikarpova	11	7
(Hong Kong) Cheung N Y	13	9
(South Korea) Kim G-e	21	21

Second Round
(South Korea) Kim H-m	21	21
Q1	(India) A Chaliha	12	16
5	(South Korea) An S-y	13	11
(South Korea) Kim G-e	21	21

Quarter-finals
(South Korea) Kim H-m	18	14
(South Korea) Kim G-e	21	21

==== Section 2 ====
First Round
4	(Spain) C Marín	21	21
(Bulgaria) L Zetchiri	16	11
(Myanmar) T H Thuzar	10	17
(South Korea) Sim Y-j	21	21
PFQ	(India) A Prabhudesai	19	8
(China) Zhang YM	21	21
(Thailand) S Katethong	19	11
(Russia) E Kosetskaya	21	21

Second Round
4	(Spain) C Marín	19	21	21
(South Korea) Sim Y-j	21	13	11
(China) Zhang YM	17	20
(Russia) E Kosetskaya	21	22

Quarter-finals
4	(Spain) C Marín	21	21
(Russia) E Kosetskaya	13	16

=== Bottom half ===
==== Section 3 ====
First Round
(Chinese Taipei) Pai Y-p	16	22	16
(Thailand) P Buranaprasertsuk	21	20	21
(Thailand) P Chaiwan	21	20	21
7	(Thailand) P Chochuwong	15	22	14
(China) Wang ZY	21	21
(Australia) Chen H-y	11	11
(England) C Birch	21	19	21
PFQ	(India) S U R Chukka	10	21	15

Second Round
(Thailand) P Buranaprasertsuk	8	10
(Thailand) P Chaiwan	21	21
(China) Wang ZY	21	18	21
(England) C Birch	8	21	11

Quarter-finals
(Thailand) P Chaiwan	21	21
(China) Wang ZY	17	12

==== Section 4 ====
First Round
(India) M Agrey	12	21	11
(Belgium) L Tan	21	19	21
Q2	(India) S Mundada	17	21	21
PFQ	(India) R Mookerjee	21	12	13
(Hong Kong) Yip P Y	19	19
Q4	(India) R Das	21	21
Q3	(India) T Lad	21	17	21
PFQ	(Russia) N Perminova	18	21	16

Second Round
(Belgium) L Tan	18	14
Q2	(India) S Mundada	21	21
Q4	(India) R Das	21	21
Q3	(India) T Lad	16	13

Quarter-finals
Q2	(India) S Mundada	26	10	19
Q4	(India) R Das	24	21	21

== Men's doubles ==
=== Seeds ===
1. (China) Han Chengkai / Zhou Haodong (semi-finals)
2. (India) Satwiksairaj Rankireddy / Chirag Shetty (first round)
3. (South Korea) Choi Sol-gyu / Seo Seung-jae (final)
4. (Chinese Taipei) Liao Min-chun / Su Ching-heng (quarter-finals)
5. (China) He Jiting / Tan Qiang (champions)
6. (England) Marcus Ellis / Chris Langridge (withdrew)
7. (Germany) Mark Lamsfuß / Marvin Emil Seidel (quarter-finals)
8. (Russia) Vladimir Ivanov / Ivan Sozonov (quarter-finals)

=== Finals ===
Semi-finals
1	(China) Han Chengkai (China) Zhou Haodong	17	16
3	(South Korea) Choi Sol-gyu (South Korea) Seo Seung-jae	21	21
5	(China) He Jiting (China) Tan Qiang	17	21	21
(China) Di Zijian (China) Wang Chang	21	11	11

Final
3	(South Korea) Choi Sol-gyu (South Korea) Seo Seung-jae	18	19
5	(China) He Jiting (China) Tan Qiang	21	21

=== Top half ===
==== Section 1 ====
First Round
1	(China) Han CK (China) Zhou HD	21	21
Q2	(India) G Deswal (India) T Sharma	10	13
Q3	(India) K Chaudhary (India) A Kadam	21	11	22
PFQ	(India) M R Raju (India) V Vasudevan	12	21	20
8	(Russia) V Ivanov (Russia) I Sozonov	21	21
(India) A George (India) S Shukla	18	16
(India) P Malik (India) V G Prasad	6	14
(Chinese Taipei) Chang K-c (Chinese Taipei) Lu C-p	21	21

Second Round
1	(China) Han CK (China) Zhou HD	21	21
Q3	(India) K Chaudhary (India) A Kadam	12	18
8	(Russia) V Ivanov (Russia) I Sozonov	21	21
(Chinese Taipei) Chang K-c (Chinese Taipei) Lu C-p	14	17

Quarter-finals
1	(China) Han CK (China) Zhou HD	12	21	21
8	(Russia) V Ivanov (Russia) I Sozonov	21	19	18

==== Section 2 ====
First Round
3	(South Korea) Choi S-g (South Korea) Seo S-j	w	/	o
(India) P Chaturvedi (India) V K Singh
(South Korea) Kim W-h (South Korea) Park K-h	21	22
(Denmark) M P Kolding (Denmark) C Mogensen	19	20
PFQ	(India) B Chakraborty (India) C Tripathi	16	15
(United States) P Chew (United States) R Chew	21	21
(Denmark) M Boe (Denmark) M C-Petersen	21	21
Q1	(India) M Gupta (India) P Nathani	8	6

Second Round
3	(South Korea) Choi S-g (South Korea) Seo S-j	21	21
(South Korea) Kim W-h (South Korea) Park K-h	19	17
(United States) P Chew (United States) R Chew	7	10
(Denmark) M Boe (Denmark) M C-Petersen	21	21

Quarter-finals
3	(South Korea) Choi S-g (South Korea) Seo S-j	w	/	o
(Denmark) M Boe (Denmark) M C-Petersen

=== Bottom half ===
==== Section 3 ====
First Round
(England) B Lane (England) S Vendy	21	21
(India) V Chawat (India) R Raturi	12	2
(India) T Kona (India) S Sharma	14	14
5	(China) He JT (China) Tan Q	21	21
PFQ	(India) S Jakhar (India) S Yadav	4
(India) M Attri (India) B. S Reddy	0^{r}
(India) V K Raganatha (India) A Surya	11	19
4	(Chinese Taipei) Liao M-c (Chinese Taipei) Su C-h	21	21

Second Round
(England) B Lane (England) S Vendy	18	17
5	(China) He JT (China) Tan Q	21	21
PFQ	(India) S Jakhar (India) S Yadav	12	10
4	(Chinese Taipei) Liao M-c (Chinese Taipei) Su C-h	21	21

Quarter-finals
5	(China) He JT (China) Tan Q	21	21
4	(Chinese Taipei) Liao M-c (Chinese Taipei) Su C-h	14	11

==== Section 4 ====
First Round
(South Korea) Na S-s (South Korea) Wang C	21	18	21
(Hong Kong) Chang T C (Hong Kong) Yeung M N	17	21	12
Q4	(India) Arjun M.R. (India) D Kapila	21	12	19
7	(Germany) M Lamsfuß (Germany) M E Seidel	17	21	21
(South Korea) Kang M-h (South Korea) Kim J-h	21	21
(India) Vaibhaav (India) P Raj	9	10
(China) Di ZJ (China) Wang C	21	23
2	(India) S Rankireddy (India) C Shetty	12	21

Second Round
(South Korea) Na S-s (South Korea) Wang C	21	16	15
7	(Germany) M Lamsfuß (Germany) M E Seidel	17	21	21
(South Korea) Kang M-h (South Korea) Kim J-h	18	21
(China) Di ZJ (China) Wang C	21	23

Quarter-finals
7	(Germany) M Lamsfuß (Germany) M E Seidel	19	22
(China) Di ZJ (China) Wang C	21	24

== Women's doubles ==
=== Seeds ===
1. (China) Chen Qingchen / Jia Yifan (withdrew)
2. (China) Du Yue / Li Yinhui (withdrew)
3. (China) Li Wenmei / Zheng Yu (withdrew)
4. (South Korea) Chang Ye-na / Kim Hye-rin (final)
5. (China) Liu Xuanxuan / Xia Yuting (withdrew)
6. (Russia) Ekaterina Bolotova / Alina Davletova (second round)
7. (South Korea) Baek Ha-na / Jung Kyung-eun (champions)
8. (India) Ashwini Ponnappa / N. Sikki Reddy (second round)

=== Finals ===
Semi-finals
(Germany) Linda Efler (Germany) Isabel Herttrich	14	12
4	(South Korea) Chang Ye-na (South Korea) Kim Hye-rin	21	21
7	(South Korea) Baek Ha-na (South Korea) Jung Kyung-eun	21	21
(Hong Kong) Ng Wing Yung (Hong Kong) Yeung Nga Ting	12	11

Final
4	(South Korea) Chang Ye-na (South Korea) Kim Hye-rin	21	15
7	(South Korea) Baek Ha-na (South Korea) Jung Kyung-eun	23	21

=== Top half ===
==== Section 1 ====
First Round
PFQ	(India) S Mishra (India) S Singh	13	21	17
PFQ	(India) R Mookerjee (India) A Prabhudesai	21	18	21
PMD	(India) N B Hazarika (India) T Ramesh	13	12
(India) S Singhi (India) R Thaker	21	21
6	(Russia) E Bolotova (Russia) A Davletova	21	21
(India) M Dang (India) K Prasad	6	10
PMD	(India) S Gahlawat (India) Y Jakhar	8	10
(Germany) L Efler (Germany) I Herttrich	21	21

Second Round
PFQ	(India) R Mookerjee (India) A Prabhudesai	12	15
(India) S Singhi (India) R Thaker	21	21
6	(Russia) E Bolotova (Russia) A Davletova	19	19
(Germany) L Efler (Germany) I Herttrich	21	21

Quarter-finals
(India) S Singhi (India) R Thaker	7	16
(Germany) L Efler (Germany) I Herttrich	21	21

==== Section 2 ====
First Round
4	(South Korea) Chang Y-n (South Korea) Kim H-r	21	21
(India) P Karki (India) M Yadav	9	6
(India) K. Maneesha (India) R Panda	w	/	o
8	(India) A Ponnappa (India) N. S Reddy	21	16	21
(Hong Kong) Ng T Y (Hong Kong) Yuen S Y	13	21	19
(India) D Choudhary (India) S S Singh	16	3
(England) C Birch (England) L Smith	21	21

Second Round
4	(South Korea) Chang Y-n (South Korea) Kim H-r	21	21
(India) K. Maneesha (India) R Panda	9	10
8	(India) A Ponnappa (India) N. S Reddy	0^{r}
(England) C Birch (England) L Smith	2

Quarter-finals
4	(South Korea) Chang Y-n (South Korea) Kim H-r	21	22
(England) C Birch (England) L Smith	14	20

=== Bottom half ===
==== Section 3 ====
First Round
(India) P Dandu (India) S Santosh	19	14
(Thailand) S Chaikittiwat (Thailand) S Paewsampran	21	21
(India) M Jakkampudi (India) P S. Ram	14	7
7	(South Korea) Baek H-n (South Korea) Jung K-e	21	21
(India) A Bhat K. (India) S Gautam	6	16
(France) D Delrue (France) L Palermo	21	21
(India) M M Bora (India) S Saikia	w	/	o
(Indonesia) D B Anjani (Indonesia) F Iwasaki

Second Round
(Thailand) S Chaikittiwat (Thailand) S Paewsampran	9	13
7	(South Korea) Baek H-n (South Korea) Jung K-e	21	21
(France) D Delrue (France) L Palermo	21	21
(India) M M Bora (India) S Saikia	6	1

Quarter-finals
7	(South Korea) Baek H-n (South Korea) Jung K-e	21	21
(France) D Delrue (France) L Palermo	5	14

==== Section 4 ====
First Round
(India) S Christian (India) S Sharma	11	5
(Hong Kong) Ng W Y (Hong Kong) Yeung N T	21	21
(India) D Gautam (India) P Naqvi	18	14
PFQ	(India) V Kapila (India) P Singh	21	21
(India) K Garg (India) A Parikh	21	21
(India) A K Jamaludeen (India) M Sinha	8	11
PMD	(India) S Sanyal (India) L Sharma	21	21
PFQ	(India) R Jaiswal (India) A Kaushik	12	10

Second Round
(Hong Kong) Ng W Y (Hong Kong) Yeung N T	21	21
PFQ	(India) V Kapila (India) P Singh	4	4
(India) K Garg (India) A Parikh	21	21
PMD	(India) S Sanyal (India) L Sharma	13	6

Quarter-finals
(Hong Kong) Ng W Y (Hong Kong) Yeung N T	21	21
(India) K Garg (India) A Parikh	15	9

== Mixed doubles ==
=== Seeds ===
1. (England) Marcus Ellis / Lauren Smith (final)
2. (Hong Kong) Tang Chun Man / Tse Ying Suet (quarter-finals)
3. (England) Chris Adcock / Gabby Adcock (withdrew)
4. (China) He Jiting / Du Yue (withdrew)
5. (Germany) Mark Lamsfuß / Isabel Herttrich (semi-finals)
6. (France) Thom Gicquel / Delphine Delrue (semi-finals)
7. (England) Ben Lane / Jessica Pugh (withdrew)
8. (Russia) Rodion Alimov / Alina Davletova (champions)

=== Finals ===
Semi-finals
1	(England) Marcus Ellis (England) Lauren Smith	23	21
5	(Germany) Mark Lamsfuß (Germany) Isabel Herttrich	21	13
6	(France) Thom Gicquel (France) Delphine Delrue	16	21	9
8	(Russia) Rodion Alimov (Russia) Alina Davletova	21	18	21

Final
1	(England) Marcus Ellis (England) Lauren Smith	18	16
8	(Russia) Rodion Alimov (Russia) Alina Davletova	21	21

=== Top half ===
==== Section 1 ====
First Round
1	(England) M Ellis (England) L Smith	21	21
(India) Arjun M.R. (India) K. Maneesha	17	19
(India) D Kapila (India) M Jakkampudi	w	/	o
(India) S Rankireddy (India) A Ponnappa
PFQ	(India) G Deswal (India) M M Bora	8	9
Q1	(South Korea) Kim W-h (South Korea) Kim H-r	21	21
(Republic of Ireland) S Magee (Republic of Ireland) C Magee	21	14	21
(India) B. S Reddy (India) K Garg	15	21	11

Second Round
1	(England) M Ellis (England) L Smith	22	21
(India) D Kapila (India) M Jakkampudi	20	8
Q1	(South Korea) Kim W-h (South Korea) Kim H-r	13	21	21
(Republic of Ireland) S Magee (Republic of Ireland) C Magee	21	17	13

Quarter-finals
1	(England) M Ellis (England) L Smith	21	21
Q1	(South Korea) Kim W-h (South Korea) Kim H-r	11	12

==== Section 2 ====
First Round
PFQ	(India) S K Krishnaprasad (India) A Bhat K.	21	21
PFQ	(India) V K Singh (India) S Saikia	14	9
(Thailand) S Jomkoh (Thailand) S Paewsampran	w	/	o
(South Korea) Ko S-h (South Korea) Eom H-w
5	(Germany) M Lamsfuß (Germany) I Herttrich	21	21
PFQ	(Hong Kong) Law C H (Hong Kong) Yeung N T	13	17
(Hong Kong) Chang T C (Hong Kong) Ng W Y	21	21
PFQ	(India) T Sharma (India) T Samantaray	14	11

Second Round
PFQ	(India) S K Krishnaprasad (India) A Bhat K.	16	18
(Thailand) S Jomkoh (Thailand) S Paewsampran	21	21
5	(Germany) M Lamsfuß (Germany) I Herttrich	21	21
(Hong Kong) Chang T C (Hong Kong) Ng W Y	16	16

Quarter-finals
(Thailand) S Jomkoh (Thailand) S Paewsampran	16	21	12
5	(Germany) M Lamsfuß (Germany) I Herttrich	21	18	21

=== Bottom half ===
==== Section 3 ====
First Round
(India) R M Rehan (India) A K Jamaludeen	6	21	21
Q2	(India) A George (India) A Parikh	21	11	10
(India) A Saxena (India) Sar Sharma	9	8
6	(France) T Gicquel (France) D Delrue	21	21
(Germany) M E Seidel (Germany) L Efler	21	30
(India) K P Garaga (India) P S. Ram	14	29
(India) P Chopra (India) N. S Reddy	21	21
PFQ	(India) K Sharma (India) D Gautam	4	3

Second Round
(India) R M Rehan (India) A K Jamaludeen	13	10
6	(France) T Gicquel (France) D Delrue	21	21
(Germany) M E Seidel (Germany) L Efler	21	18	21
(India) P Chopra (India) N. S Reddy	12	21	13

Quarter-finals
6	(France) T Gicquel (France) D Delrue	19	30	21
(Germany) M E Seidel (Germany) L Efler	21	28	18

==== Section 4 ====
First Round
(India) Sau Sharma (India) P Dandu	21	21
(India) V G Prasad (India) J Dewangan	9	8
Q3	(Hong Kong) Ho W L (Hong Kong) Yuen S Y	13	16
8	(Russia) R Alimov (Russia) A Davletova	21	21
Q4	(India) S Sharma (India) R Panda	20	14
(Hong Kong) Yeung M N (Hong Kong) Ng T Y	22	21
(India) U Arora (India) K Wadkar	16	12
2	(Hong Kong) Tang C M (Hong Kong) Tse Y S	21	21

Second Round
(India) Sau Sharma (India) P Dandu	15	11
8	(Russia) R Alimov (Russia) A Davletova	21	21
(Hong Kong) Yeung M N (Hong Kong) Ng T Y	16	19
2	(Hong Kong) Tang C M (Hong Kong) Tse Y S	21	21

Quarter-finals
8	(Russia) R Alimov (Russia) A Davletova	11	23	21
2	(Hong Kong) Tang C M (Hong Kong) Tse Y S	21	21	11

Preceded by 2019 Korea Masters	BWF World Tour; 2019 BWF season	Succeeded by 2019 BWF World Tour Finals
