= Kim Hye-jeong =

South Korean badminton player (born 1998)

Personal information
- Born: 3 January 1998 (age 28) Masan, South Gyeongsang Province, South Korea
- Height: 1.61 m (5 ft 3 in)

Sport
- Country: South Korea
- Sport: Badminton
- Handedness: Right

Women's & mixed doubles
- Highest ranking: 3 (WD with Jeong Na-eun, 27 December 2022); 3 (WD with Kong Hee-yong, 21 October 2025); 49 (XD with Kim Hwi-tae, 12 March 2019)
- Current ranking: 22 (WD with Kong Hee-yong, 27 October 2026)
- BWF profile
Medal record
Women's badminton
Representing South Korea
Sudirman Cup
| Silver medal – second place | 2023 Suzhou | Mixed team |
| Silver medal – second place | 2025 Xiamen | Mixed team |
Uber Cup
| Gold medal – first place | 2022 Bangkok | Women's team |
| Gold medal – first place | 2026 Horsens | Women's team |
| Bronze medal – third place | 2024 Chengdu | Women's team |
Asian Games
| Gold medal – first place | 2022 Hangzhou | Women's team |
| Bronze medal – third place | 2026 Aichi–Nagoya | Women's team |
Asia Team Championships
| Gold medal – first place | 2026 Qingdao | Women's team |
World Junior Championships
| Bronze medal – third place | 2016 Bilbao | Mixed doubles |
Asian Junior Championships
| Silver medal – second place | 2014 Taipei | Mixed team |
| Silver medal – second place | 2015 Bangkok | Mixed doubles |
| Silver medal – second place | 2015 Bangkok | Mixed team |
| Bronze medal – third place | 2014 Taipei | Mixed doubles |
| Bronze medal – third place | 2015 Bangkok | Girls' doubles |

Kim Hye-jeong (Korean: 김혜정; born 3 January 1998) is a South Korean badminton player. She has shown her potential as a badminton player since she was young. Kim entered the regular training in the second grade of elementary school in Wanwol-dong, Masan, and was part of the school team that won the junior national championships in 2008. She twice won the German Junior Open in 2014 and 2015 in the girls' doubles event, and clinched two titles at the 2015 Thailand Open in the girls' and mixed doubles event. Kim was part of the national junior team that won the mixed team silver medal at the 2014 and 2015 Asian Junior Championships, and in the individual event, she claim the mixed doubles bronze in 2014, and 2015 silver and bronze medals in the girls' and mixed doubles event respectively. At the 2016 World Junior Championships, she finished in the semifinals, and settled for the bronze medal. Kim joined the MG Saemaeul team in 2016, and selected to join the national team in 2018.

== Personal life ==
She was born in the badminton family. Her mother Chung So-young is the 1992 Olympic gold medalist and her father Kim Bum-shik, is a badminton coach.

== Achievements ==
=== BWF World Junior Championships ===
Mixed doubles
| Year | Venue | Partner | Opponent | Score | Result |
|---|---|---|---|---|---|
| 2016 | Bilbao Arena; Bilbao, Spain | (South Korea) Park Kyung-hoon | (China) Zhou Haodong (China) Hu Yuxiang | 17–21, 18–21 | Bronze |

=== Asian Junior Championships ===
Girls' doubles
| Year | Venue | Partner | Opponent | Score | Result |
|---|---|---|---|---|---|
| 2015 | CPB Badminton Training Center; Bangkok, Thailand | (South Korea) Park Keun-hye | (China) Du Yue (China) Li Yinhui | 21–18, 10–21, 19–21 | Bronze |

Mixed doubles
| Year | Venue | Partner | Opponent | Score | Result |
|---|---|---|---|---|---|
| 2015 | CPB Badminton Training Center; Bangkok, Thailand | (South Korea) Choi Jong-woo | (China) Zheng Siwei (China) Chen Qingchen | 8–21, 12–21 | Silver |
| 2014 | Taipei Gymnasium; Taipei, Chinese Taipei | (South Korea) Kim Jae-hwan | (China) Huang Kaixiang (China) Chen Qingchen | 9–21, 19–21 | Bronze |

=== BWF World Tour (10 titles, 6 runners-up) ===
The BWF World Tour, which was announced on 19 March 2017 and implemented in 2018, is a series of elite badminton tournaments sanctioned by the Badminton World Federation (BWF). The BWF World Tour is divided into levels of World Tour Finals, Super 1000, Super 750, Super 500, Super 300, and the BWF Tour Super 100.

Women's doubles
| Year | Tournament | Level | Partner | Opponent | Score | Result |
|---|---|---|---|---|---|---|
| 2018 | U.S. Open | Super 300 | (South Korea) Kim So-yeong | (China) Tang Jinhua (China) Yu Xiaohan | 21–18, 13–21, 15–21 | (silver) Runner-up |
| 2019 | Singapore Open | Super 500 | (South Korea) Kong Hee-yong | (Japan) Mayu Matsumoto (Japan) Wakana Nagahara | 17–21, 20–22 | (silver) Runner-up |
| 2021 | Indonesia Masters | Super 750 | (South Korea) Jeong Na-eun | (Japan) Nami Matsuyama (Japan) Chiharu Shida | 9–21, 11–21 | (silver) Runner-up |
| 2022 | Korea Open | Super 500 | (South Korea) Jeong Na-eun | (Thailand) Benyapa Aimsaard (Thailand) Nuntakarn Aimsaard | 21–16, 21–12 | (gold) Winner |
| 2022 | Japan Open | Super 750 | (South Korea) Jeong Na-eun | (South Korea) Baek Ha-na (South Korea) Lee Yu-lim | 23–21, 28–26 | (gold) Winner |
| 2023 | Korea Masters | Super 300 | (South Korea) Jeong Na-eun | (Japan) Rui Hirokami (Japan) Yuna Kato | 21–12, 21–19 | (gold) Winner |
| 2024 | Korea Open | Super 500 | (South Korea) Jeong Na-eun | (Malaysia) Pearly Tan (Malaysia) Thinaah Muralitharan | 21–12, 21–11 | (gold) Winner |
| 2024 | Korea Masters | Super 300 | (South Korea) Kong Hee-yong | (China) Li Yijing (China) Luo Xumin | 21–14, 16–21, 21–18 | (gold) Winner |
| 2025 | India Open | Super 750 | (South Korea) Kong Hee-yong | (Japan) Arisa Igarashi (Japan) Ayako Sakuramoto | 15–21, 13–21 | (silver) Runner-up |
| 2025 | Indonesia Masters | Super 500 | (South Korea) Kong Hee-yong | (Malaysia) Pearly Tan (Malaysia) Thinaah Muralitharan | 21–12, 17–21, 21–18 | (gold) Winner |
| 2025 | Orléans Masters | Super 300 | (South Korea) Kong Hee-yong | (South Korea) Baek Ha-na (South Korea) Lee So-hee | 21–18, 23–21 | (gold) Winner |
| 2025 | Singapore Open | Super 750 | (South Korea) Kong Hee-yong | (Japan) Rin Iwanaga (Japan) Kie Nakanishi | 21–16, 21–14 | (gold) Winner |
| 2025 | China Masters | Super 750 | (South Korea) Kong Hee-yong | (China) Jia Yifan (China) Zhang Shuxian | 19–21, 21–16, 13–21 | (silver) Runner-up |
| 2025 | Korea Open | Super 500 | (South Korea) Kong Hee-yong | (Japan) Rin Iwanaga (Japan) Kie Nakanishi | 21–19, 21–12 | (gold) Winner |
| 2025 | Denmark Open | Super 750 | (South Korea) Kong Hee-yong | (South Korea) Baek Ha-na (South Korea) Lee So-hee | 21–15, 14–21, 15–21 | (silver) Runner-up |
| 2026 | Japan Open | Super 750 | (South Korea) Kong Hee-yong | (China) Jia Yifan (China) Zhang Shuxian | 14–21, 21–15, 30–29 | (gold) Winner |

=== BWF International Challenge/Series (1 runner-up) ===
Women's doubles
| Year | Tournament | Partner | Opponent | Score | Result |
|---|---|---|---|---|---|
| 2024 | Saipan International | (South Korea) Kim Yu-jung | (Japan) Kokona Ishikawa (Japan) Mio Konegawa | 19–21, 21–11, 18–21 | (silver) Runner-up |

BWF International Challenge tournament
