= He Jiting =

Chinese badminton player

He Jiting 何济霆
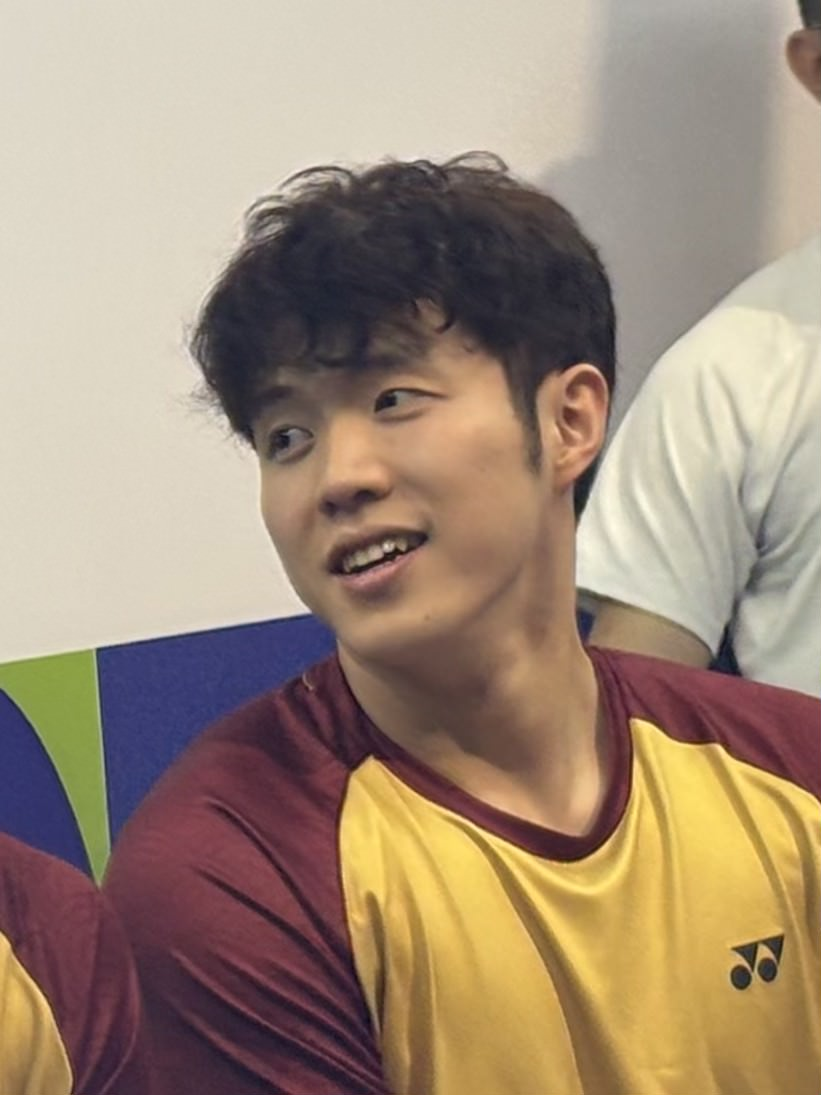
- He Jiting during the 2025 Malaysia Open

Personal information
- Born: 19 February 1998 (age 28) Shaowu, Fujian, China
- Height: 1.81 m (5 ft 11 in)

Sport
- Country: China
- Sport: Badminton
- Handedness: Right

Men's & mixed doubles
- Highest ranking: 4 (MD with Ren Xiangyu, 22 October 2024); 10 (MD with Tan Qiang, 23 July 2019); 8 (XD with Du Yue, 31 May 2018)
- Current ranking: 27 (MD with Ren Xiangyu, 10 November 2026)
- BWF profile
Medal record
Men's badminton
Representing China
World Championships
Silver medal – second place	2021 Huelva	Men's doubles
Sudirman Cup
Gold medal – first place	2021 Vantaa	Mixed team
Thomas Cup
Gold medal – first place	2024 Chengdu	Men's team
Gold medal – first place	2026 Horsens	Men's team
Silver medal – second place	2020 Aarhus	Men's team
Asian Games
Silver medal – second place	2026 Aichi–Nagoya	Men's team
Asian Championships
Silver medal – second place	2019 Wuhan	Mixed doubles
Bronze medal – third place	2026 Ningbo	Men’s doubles
Asia Mixed Team Championships
Gold medal – first place	2019 Hong Kong	Mixed team
Gold medal – first place	2023 Dubai	Mixed team
Asia Team Championships
Gold medal – first place	2024 Selangor	Men's team
Silver medal – second place	2018 Alor Setar	Men's team
Silver medal – second place	2026 Qingdao	Men's team
World University Games
Silver medal – second place	2021 Chengdu	Men's doubles
Silver medal – second place	2021 Chengdu	Mixed team
World Junior Championships
Gold medal – first place	2014 Alor Setar	Mixed team
Gold medal – first place	2015 Lima	Boys' doubles
Gold medal – first place	2015 Lima	Mixed team
Gold medal – first place	2016 Bilbao	Mixed doubles
Gold medal – first place	2016 Bilbao	Mixed team
Silver medal – second place	2015 Lima	Mixed doubles
Asian Junior Championships
Gold medal – first place	2014 Taipei	Mixed team
Gold medal – first place	2015 Bangkok	Boys' doubles
Gold medal – first place	2015 Bangkok	Mixed team
Gold medal – first place	2016 Bangkok	Mixed doubles
Gold medal – first place	2016 Bangkok	Mixed team
Silver medal – second place	2016 Bangkok	Boys' doubles
Bronze medal – third place	2015 Bangkok	Mixed doubles

He Jiting (simplified Chinese: 何济霆; traditional Chinese: 何濟霆, born 19 February 1998) is a Chinese badminton player. As a junior player, his best achievements was winning the boys' doubles at the 2015 Asian and World Junior Championships, later won the mixed doubles at the 2016 Asian and World Junior Championships. He was part of the national team that lifted the 2019 and 2023 Tong Yun Kai Cup, 2021 Sudirman Cup, and also at the 2024 and 2026 Thomas Cup.

== Achievements ==
=== BWF World Championships ===
Men's doubles
Year	Venue	Partner	Opponent	Score	Result
2021	Palacio de los Deportes Carolina Marín, Huelva, Spain	(China) Tan Qiang	(Japan) Takuro Hoki (Japan) Yugo Kobayashi	12–21, 18–21	Silver

=== Asian Championships ===
Men's doubles
Year	Venue	Partner	Opponent	Score	Result
2026	Ningbo Olympic Sports Center Gymnasium, Ningbo, China	(China) Ren Xiangyu	(South Korea) Kim Won-ho (South Korea) Seo Seung-jae	13–21, 20–22	Bronze

Mixed doubles
Year	Venue	Partner	Opponent	Score	Result
2019	Wuhan Sports Center Gymnasium, Wuhan, China	(China) Du Yue	(China) Wang Yilyu (China) Huang Dongping	11–21, 21–13, 21–23	Silver

=== World University Games ===
Men's doubles
Year	Venue	Partner	Opponent	Score	Result	Ref.
2021	Shuangliu Sports Centre Gymnasium; Chengdu, China	(China) Zhou Haodong	(China) Ren Xiangyu (China) Tan Qiang	21–23, 16–21	Silver	

=== BWF World Junior Championships ===
Boys' doubles
Year	Venue	Partner	Opponent	Score	Result
2015	Centro de Alto Rendimiento de la Videna; Lima, Peru	(China) Zheng Siwei	(Denmark) Joel Eipe (Denmark) Frederik Søgaard	21–14, 21–16	Gold

Mixed doubles
Year	Venue	Partner	Opponent	Score	Result
2015	Centro de Alto Rendimiento de la Videna; Lima, Peru	(China) Du Yue	(China) Zheng Siwei (China) Chen Qingchen	19–21, 8–21	Silver
2016	Bilbao Arena; Bilbao, Spain	(China) Du Yue	(China) Zhou Haodong (China) Hu Yuxiang	21–13, 21–15	Gold

=== Asian Junior Championships ===
Boys' doubles
Year	Venue	Partner	Opponent	Score	Result
2015	CPB Badminton Training Center; Bangkok, Thailand	(China) Zheng Siwei	(China) Han Chengkai (China) Zhou Haodong	21–19, 18–21, 21–18	Gold
2016	CPB Badminton Training Center; Bangkok, Thailand	(China) Tan Qiang	(China) Han Chengkai (China) Zhou Haodong	12–21, 17–21	Silver

Mixed doubles
Year	Venue	Partner	Opponent	Score	Result
2015	CPB Badminton Training Center; Bangkok, Thailand	(China) Du Yue	(South Korea) Choi Jong-woo (South Korea) Kim Hye-jeong	18–21, 15–21	Bronze
2016	CPB Badminton Training Center; Bangkok, Thailand	(China) Du Yue	(South Korea) Kim Won-ho (South Korea) Lee Yu-rim	21–12, 19–21, 21–19	Gold

=== BWF World Tour (8 titles, 8 runners-up) ===
The BWF World Tour, which was announced on 19 March 2017 and implemented in 2018, is a series of elite badminton tournaments sanctioned by the Badminton World Federation (BWF). The BWF World Tour is divided into levels of World Tour Finals, Super 1000, Super 750, Super 500, Super 300, and the BWF Tour Super 100.

Men's doubles
Year	Tournament	Level	Partner	Opponent	Score	Result
2018	Fuzhou China Open	Super 750	(China) Tan Qiang	(Indonesia) Marcus Fernaldi Gideon (Indonesia) Kevin Sanjaya Sukamuljo	27–25, 17–21, 15–21	(silver) Runner-up
2019	Syed Modi International	Super 300	(China) Tan Qiang	(South Korea) Choi Sol-gyu (South Korea) Seo Seung-jae	21–18, 21–19	(gold) Winner
2022	Vietnam Open	Super 100	(China) Zhou Haodong	(China) Ren Xiangyu (China) Tan Qiang	21–17, 18–21, 8–21	(silver) Runner-up
2022	Indonesia Masters	Super 100	(China) Zhou Haodong	(Indonesia) Rahmat Hidayat (Indonesia) Pramudya Kusumawardana	18–21, 19–21	(silver) Runner-up
2023	Indonesia Masters	Super 500	(China) Zhou Haodong	(Indonesia) Leo Rolly Carnando (Indonesia) Daniel Marthin	17–21, 16–21	(silver) Runner-up
2023	Spain Masters	Super 300	(China) Zhou Haodong	(Chinese Taipei) Lee Fang-chih (Chinese Taipei) Lee Fang-jen	21–5, 21–12	(gold) Winner
2023	Japan Masters	Super 500	(China) Ren Xiangyu	(China) Liu Yuchen (China) Ou Xuanyi	21–14, 15–21, 21–15	(gold) Winner
2024	Thailand Masters	Super 300	(China) Ren Xiangyu	(Thailand) Peeratchai Sukphun (Thailand) Pakkapon Teeraratsakul	16–21, 21–14, 21–13	(gold) Winner
2024	German Open	Super 300	(China) Ren Xiangyu	(Chinese Taipei) Lee Jhe-huei (Chinese Taipei) Yang Po-hsuan	21–15, 21–23, 21–23	(silver) Runner-up
2024	Singapore Open	Super 750	(China) Ren Xiangyu	(Indonesia) Fajar Alfian (Indonesia) Muhammad Rian Ardianto	21–19, 21–14	(gold) Winner
2024	Australian Open	Super 500	(China) Ren Xiangyu	(Indonesia) Mohammad Ahsan (Indonesia) Hendra Setiawan	21–11, 21–10	(gold) Winner
2024	China Open	Super 1000	(China) Ren Xiangyu	(Malaysia) Goh Sze Fei (Malaysia) Nur Izzuddin	21–13, 12–21, 17–21	(silver) Runner-up
2026	Ruichang China Masters	Super 100	(China) Ren Xiangyu	(China) Lin Yifan (China) Yang Jiayi	21–12, 16–21, 23–21	(gold) Winner
2026	China Masters	Super 750	(China) Ren Xiangyu	(India) Satwiksairaj Rankireddy (India) Chirag Shetty	21–11, 13–21, 17–21	(silver) Runner-up

Mixed doubles
Year	Tournament	Level	Partner	Opponent	Score	Result
2018	Korea Open	Super 500	(China) Du Yue	(Denmark) Mathias Christiansen (Denmark) Christinna Pedersen	21–18, 21–16	(gold) Winner
2019	Hong Kong Open	Super 500	(China) Du Yue	(Japan) Yuta Watanabe (Japan) Arisa Higashino	20–22, 16–21	(silver) Runner-up

=== BWF Grand Prix (2 titles) ===
The BWF Grand Prix had two levels, the Grand Prix and Grand Prix Gold. It was a series of badminton tournaments sanctioned by the Badminton World Federation (BWF) and played between 2007 and 2017.

Mixed doubles
Year	Tournament	Partner	Opponent	Score	Result
2017	Thailand Open	(China) Du Yue	(Malaysia) Goh Soon Huat (Malaysia) Shevon Jemie Lai	21–13, 16–21, 21–12	(gold) Winner
2017	Bitburger Open	(China) Du Yue	(Denmark) Anders Skaarup Rasmussen (Denmark) Line Kjærsfeldt	21–18, 21–17	(gold) Winner

BWF Grand Prix Gold tournament
BWF Grand Prix tournament
