= 2016 Badminton Asia Junior Championships – Mixed doubles =

Tournament details
- Dates: 13 – 17 July 2016
- Edition: 19
- Venue: CPB Badminton and Sports Science Training Center
- Location: Bangkok, Thailand

The mixed doubles tournament of the 2016 Badminton Asia Junior Championships was held from July 13 to 17 at the CPB Badminton and Sports Science Training Center, Bangkok. The defending champions of the last edition were Zheng Siwei and Chen Qingchen from China. He Jiting / Du Yue of China and Pakin Kuna-Anuvit / Kwanchanok Sudjaipraparat of Thailand leads the seeding this year. The former mixed doubles bronze medalist in the last edition He and Du emerged as the champion after defeat the South Korean duo Kim Won-ho and Lee Yu-rim in the finals with the score 21–12, 19–21, 21–19.

== Seeded ==
1. (China) He Jiting / Du Yue (champions)
2. (Thailand) Pakin Kuna-Anuvit / Kwanchanok Sudjaipraparat (second round)
3. (Indonesia) Rinov Rivaldy / Apriani Rahayu (semi final)
4. (Thailand) Pachaarapol Nipornram / Ruethaichanok Laisuan (second round)
5. (Indonesia) Andika Ramadiansyah / Mychelle Chrystine Bandaso (quarter final)
6. (Japan) Hiroki Okamura / Nami Matsuyama (third round)
7. (Hong Kong) Lam Wai Lok / Ng Tsz Yau (second round)
8. (China) Zhu Junhao / Zhou Chaomin (quarter final)

== Finals ==
Quarterfinals
1	(China) He Jiting (China) Du Yue	21	21
5	(Indonesia) Andika Ramadiansyah (Indonesia) Mychelle Chrystine Bandaso	16	13
(China) Zhou Haodong (China) Hu Yuxiang	21	21
(Japan) Mahiro Kaneko (Japan) Minami Kawashima	18	15
8	(China) Zhu Junhao (China) Zhou Chaomin	21	11	16
3	(Indonesia) Rinov Rivaldy (Indonesia) Apriani Rahayu	17	21	21
(South Korea) Kim Won-ho (South Korea) Lee Yu-rim	21	21
(Malaysia) Chen Tang Jie (Malaysia) Pearly Tan Koong Le	17	16

Semifinals
1	(China) He Jiting (China) Du Yue	21	21
(China) Zhou Haodong (China) Hu Yuxiang	14	12
3	(Indonesia) Rinov Rivaldy (Indonesia) Apriani Rahayu	17	20
(South Korea) Kim Won-ho (South Korea) Lee Yu-rim	21	22

Final
1	(China) He Jiting (China) Du Yue	21	19	21
(South Korea) Kim Won-ho (South Korea) Lee Yu-rim	12	21	19

== Top half ==
=== Section 1 ===
First round
(Chinese Taipei) Ye H-w (Chinese Taipei) Lo P-t	21	21
(Sri Lanka) C Illeperumachchi (Sri Lanka) L Hettiarachchi	5	13
(Thailand) P Worasaktyanan (Thailand) A Sapniti	15	21	21
(India) D Kapila (India) M Umakant	21	12	16

Second round
1	(China) He JT (China) Du Y	21	21
(Chinese Taipei) Ye H-w (Chinese Taipei) Lo P-t	8	10
(Malaysia) Hoo P R (Malaysia) T Muralitharan	21	21	21
(Thailand) P Worasaktyanan (Thailand) A Sapniti	23	19	16

Third round
1	(China) He JT (China) Du Y	21	21
(Malaysia) Hoo P R (Malaysia) T Muralitharan	12	18

=== Section 2 ===
First round
(Hong Kong) Lui C W (Hong Kong) Leung S L	21	21
(Macau) Che P N (Macau) Ng W C	13	11
(Philippines) N Tapales (Philippines) E C Inlayo	w	/	o
(Singapore) A Kwek (Singapore) C Wong
(South Korea) Lee H-b (South Korea) Kim M-j	12	21	13
(Japan) N Yamazawa (Japan) S Hobara	21	19	21

Second round
5	(Indonesia) A Ramadiansyah (Indonesia) M C Bandaso	21	21
(Hong Kong) Lui C W (Hong Kong) Leung S L	16	11
(Singapore) A Kwek (Singapore) C Wong	18	17
(Japan) N Yamazawa (Japan) S Hobara	21	21

Third round
5	(Indonesia) A Ramadiansyah (Indonesia) M C Bandaso	23	21
(Japan) N Yamazawa (Japan) S Hobara	21	18

=== Section 3 ===
First round
(Singapore) R Loh (Singapore) N I Khan	11	10
(Indonesia) A Syahnawi (Indonesia) T O Kusumah	21	21
(China) Zhou HD (China) Hu YX	21	21
(India) B Yadav (India) R Mukherjee	11	8
(Sri Lanka) N Wijesekera (Sri Lanka) V Edirisinghe	13	8
(Vietnam) Le D P (Vietnam) Pham T K	21	21

Second round
4	(Thailand) P Nipornram (Thailand) R Laisuan	14	8
(Indonesia) A Syahnawi (Indonesia) T O Kusumah	21	21
(China) Zhou HD (China) Hu YX	21	21
(Vietnam) Le D P (Vietnam) Pham T K	10	18

Third round
(Indonesia) A Syahnawi (Indonesia) T O Kusumah	12	14
(China) Zhou HD (China) Hu YX	21	21

=== Section 4 ===
First round
(South Korea) Kang M-h (South Korea) Park G-e	21	21
(Mongolia) T Gombodorj (Mongolia) T Choinkhor	1	3
(Japan) M Kaneko (Japan) M Kawashima	21	21
(Chinese Taipei) Yang C-h (Chinese Taipei) Lee C-c	16	14
(Thailand) K Wanaroon (Thailand) C Charoenwat	21	19	21
(Kazakhstan) D Panarin (Kazakhstan) I Gordeyeva	14	21	10

Second round
7	(Hong Kong) Lam W L (Hong Kong) Ng T Y	20	12
(South Korea) Kang M-h (South Korea) Park G-e	22	21
(Japan) M Kaneko (Japan) M Kawashima	21	21
(Thailand) K Wanaroon (Thailand) C Charoenwat	18	19

Third round
(South Korea) Kang M-h (South Korea) Park G-e	21	15	12
(Japan) M Kaneko (Japan) M Kawashima	19	21	21

== Bottom half ==
=== Section 5 ===
First round
(Singapore) Lee J L (Singapore) K S Koh	21	21
(Sri Lanka) C Dias (Sri Lanka) S Gurusinghe	10	11
(Vietnam) Nguyen D G (Vietnam) Tran T P T	13	9
(Malaysia) Ng E C (Malaysia) Toh E W	21	21
(Japan) Y Kubota (Japan) N Sone	22	21
(South Korea) Na S-s (South Korea) Lee Y-n	20	13

Second round
(Singapore) Lee J L (Singapore) K S Koh	22	9
(Malaysia) Ng E C (Malaysia) Toh E W	24	21
(Japan) Y Kubota (Japan) N Sone	14	14
8	(China) Zhu JH (China) Zhou CM	21	21

Third round
(Malaysia) Ng E C (Malaysia) Toh E W	13	19
8	(China) Zhu JH (China) Zhou CM	21	21

=== Section 6 ===
First round
(Philippines) S Padiz Jr (Philippines) J Francisco	w	/	o
(Chinese Taipei) Su L-w (Chinese Taipei) Chang Y-h
(Myanmar) Hein S T T (Myanmar) Thet H T	9	12
(Hong Kong) Kwok C H (Hong Kong) Yeung N T	21	21
(Kazakhstan) I Yuldashev (Kazakhstan) Y Kharchenko	9	18
(Thailand) P Termthanasak (Thailand) S Paewsampran	21	21

Second round
(Chinese Taipei) Su L-w (Chinese Taipei) Chang Y-h	21	22
(Hong Kong) Kwok C H (Hong Kong) Yeung N T	19	20
(Thailand) P Termthanasak (Thailand) S Paewsampran	15	12
3	(Indonesia) R Rivaldy (Indonesia) A Rahayu	21	21

Third round
(Chinese Taipei) Su L-w (Chinese Taipei) Chang Y-h	17	15
3	(Indonesia) R Rivaldy (Indonesia) A Rahayu	21	21

=== Section 7 ===
First round
(South Korea) Kim W-h (South Korea) Lee Y-r	21	21
(India) K P Garaga (India) M Aggarwal	12	10
(Sri Lanka) K Amarasena (Sri Lanka) D Dias	11	13
(Indonesia) M R Darwis (Indonesia) V A Sukoco	21	21
(Thailand) W Sarapat (Thailand) F Loog	9	15
(Chinese Taipei) Lu M-c (Chinese Taipei) Hu L-f	21	21

Second round
(South Korea) Kim W-h (South Korea) Lee Y-r	21	21
(Indonesia) M R Darwis (Indonesia) V A Sukoco	13	15
(Chinese Taipei) Lu M-c (Chinese Taipei) Hu L-f	19	16
6	(Japan) H Okamura (Japan) N Matsuyama	21	21

Third round
(South Korea) Kim W-h (South Korea) Lee Y-r	21	23
6	(Japan) H Okamura (Japan) N Matsuyama	19	21

=== Section 8 ===
First round
(Philippines) F K Gabuelo (Philippines) T M Pomar	w	/	0
(Macau) Pui P F (Macau) Gong X X
(Malaysia) Chen T J (Malaysia) P Tan	21	21
(Hong Kong) Ko S H (Hong Kong) Yeung P L	13	11
(China) Li JQ (China) Shen LJ	21	21
(Singapore) Toh H Z (Singapore) J R Sito	19	14

Second round
(Macau) Pui P F (Macau) Gong X X	10	12
(Malaysia) Chen T J (Malaysia) P Tan	21	21
(China) Li JQ (China) Shen LJ	19	21	21
2	(Thailand) P Kuna-Anuvit (Thailand) K Sudjaipraparat	21	18	19

Third round
(Malaysia) Chen T J (Malaysia) P Tan	21	21
(China) Li JQ (China) Shen LJ	14	15
