= Chen Tang Jie =

Malaysian badminton player

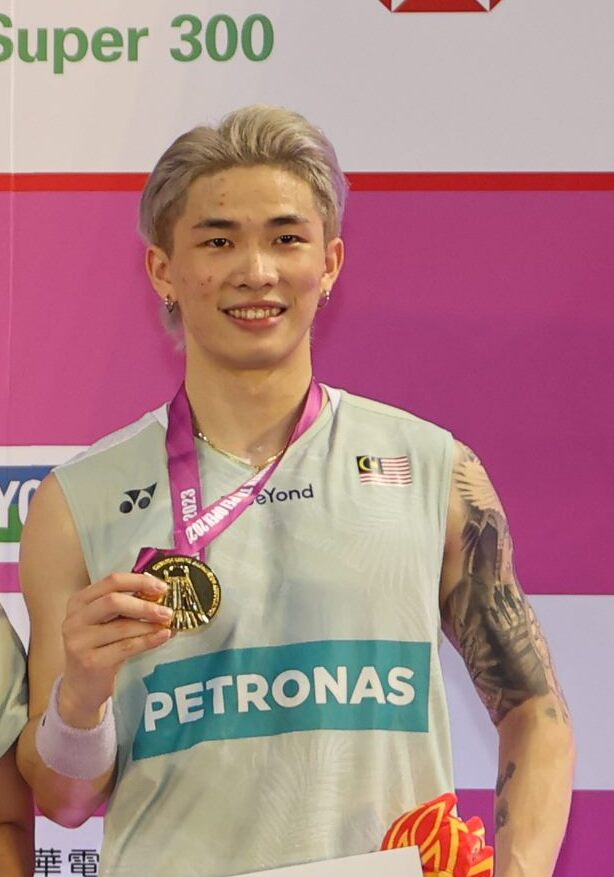
- Chen Tang Jie at 2023 Taipei Open

Personal information
- Born: 5 January 1998 (age 28) Ipoh, Perak, Malaysia
- Years active: 2014–present
- Height: 1.80 m (5 ft 11 in)

Sport
- Country: Malaysia
- Sport: Badminton
- Handedness: Right
- Coached by: Nova Widianto

Mixed doubles
- Highest ranking: 3 (with Toh Ee Wei, 14 January 2025); 21 (with Peck Yen Wei, 8 November 2022)
- Current ranking: 21 (with Toh Ee Wei, 10 November 2026)
- BWF profile
Medal record
Men's badminton
Representing Malaysia
World Championships
Gold medal – first place	2025 Paris	Mixed doubles
Sudirman Cup
Bronze medal – third place	2021 Vantaa	Mixed team
Bronze medal – third place	2023 Suzhou	Mixed team
SEA Games
Gold medal – first place	2021 Vietnam	Mixed doubles
Silver medal – second place	2021 Vietnam	Men's team
Silver medal – second place	2025 Thailand	Men's team
Bronze medal – third place	2025 Thailand	Mixed doubles
World Junior Championships
Silver medal – second place	2016 Bilbao	Mixed team
Bronze medal – third place	2016 Bilbao	Mixed doubles

Chen Tang Jie
- Traditional Chinese: 陳堂傑
- Simplified Chinese: 陈堂杰
Transcriptions
Standard Mandarin
- Hanyu Pinyin: Chén Tángjié
Yue: Cantonese
- Jyutping: Can4 Tong4 Git6
Southern Min
- Hokkien POJ: Tân Tông-kia̍t

Chen Tang Jie PPT (simplified Chinese: 陈堂杰; traditional Chinese: 陳堂傑; pinyin: Chén Tángjié; born 5 January 1998) is a Malaysian badminton player. A world champion, he and his partner Toh Ee Wei won the mixed doubles title at the 2025 World Championships. He and Toh became the first ever world badminton champions in mixed doubles and the second ever world badminton champions from Malaysia after Aaron Chia and Soh Wooi Yik. He was part of the Malaysian 2016 Asian Junior Championships and 2016 BWF World Junior Championships team, and helped Malaysia to clinch a silver medal in the World Junior mixed team before being defeated by China.

== Career ==
Chen was selected into the Malaysian squad for 2016 World Junior Championships. Before that, he had shown his commitment on the court by reaching quarter-finals of the Asian Junior Championships with Pearly Tan in July 2016. They were just paired up few weeks before the tournament and was defeated by the Korean pair Kim Won-ho and Lee Yu-rim (defeated 17–21, 16–21). At the World Junior Championships, Chen took part in both men's and mixed doubles, where he partnered with Man Wei Chong and Toh Ee Wei respectively. He showed his potential by finishing with a bronze medal in the mixed doubles with Toh before the duo were beaten by the Chinese pair He Jiting and Du Yue in straight games.

Partnered with Toh Ee Wei, Chen entered the mixed doubles top 10 of the BWF world ranking in September 2023.

== Achievements ==
=== BWF World Championships ===
Mixed doubles
Year	Venue	Partner	Opponent	Score	Result
2025	Adidas Arena, Paris, France	(Malaysia) Toh Ee Wei	(China) Jiang Zhenbang (China) Wei Yaxin	21–15, 21–14	Gold

=== SEA Games ===
Mixed doubles
Year	Venue	Partner	Opponent	Score	Result
2021	Bac Giang Gymnasium, Bắc Giang, Vietnam	(Malaysia) Peck Yen Wei	(Malaysia) Hoo Pang Ron (Malaysia) Cheah Yee See	15–21, 21–19, 21–13	Gold
2025	Gymnasium 4, Thammasat University Rangsit Campus, Pathum Thani, Thailand	(Malaysia) Toh Ee Wei	(Thailand) Ruttanapak Oupthong (Thailand) Jhenicha Sudjaipraparat	15–21, 16–21	Bronze

=== BWF World Junior Championships ===
Mixed doubles
Year	Venue	Partner	Opponent	Score	Result
2016	Bilbao Arena, Bilbao, Spain	(Malaysia) Toh Ee Wei	(China) He Jiting (China) Du Yue	14–21, 11–21	Bronze

=== BWF World Tour (5 titles, 5 runners-up) ===
The BWF World Tour, which was announced on 19 March 2017 and implemented in 2018, is a series of elite badminton tournaments sanctioned by the Badminton World Federation (BWF). The BWF World Tours are divided into levels of World Tour Finals, Super 1000, Super 750, Super 500, Super 300 (part of the BWF World Tour), and the BWF Tour Super 100.

Mixed doubles
Year	Tournament	Level	Partner	Opponent	Score	Result
2022	India Open	Super 500	(Malaysia) Peck Yen Wei	(Singapore) Terry Hee (Singapore) Tan Wei Han	15–21, 18–21	(silver) Runner-up
2023	Orléans Masters	Super 300	(Malaysia) Toh Ee Wei	(Chinese Taipei) Ye Hong-wei (Chinese Taipei) Lee Chia-hsin	21–19, 21–17	(gold) Winner
2023	Taipei Open	Super 300	(Malaysia) Toh Ee Wei	(Chinese Taipei) Chiu Hsiang-chieh (Chinese Taipei) Lin Xiao-min	21–12, 21–8	(gold) Winner
2024	Thailand Masters	Super 300	(Malaysia) Toh Ee Wei	(Thailand) Dechapol Puavaranukroh (Thailand) Sapsiree Taerattanachai	12–21, 18–21	(silver) Runner-up
2024	Swiss Open	Super 300	(Malaysia) Toh Ee Wei	(Malaysia) Goh Soon Huat (Malaysia) Shevon Jemie Lai	16–21, 13–21	(silver) Runner-up
2024	Korea Open	Super 500	(Malaysia) Toh Ee Wei	(China) Guo Xinwa (China) Li Qian	17–21, 21–13, 21–13	(gold) Winner
2024	BWF World Tour Finals	World Tour Finals	(Malaysia) Toh Ee Wei	(China) Zheng Siwei (China) Huang Yaqiong	18–21, 21–14, 17–21	(silver) Runner-up
2025	China Masters	Super 750	(Malaysia) Toh Ee Wei	(Thailand) Dechapol Puavaranukroh (Thailand) Supissara Paewsampran	8–21, 17–21	(silver) Runner-up
2025	Australian Open	Super 500	(Malaysia) Toh Ee Wei	(Indonesia) Jafar Hidayatullah (Indonesia) Felisha Pasaribu	21–16, 21–11	(gold) Winner
2026	Indonesia Masters	Super 500	(Malaysia) Toh Ee Wei	(Denmark) Mathias Christiansen (Denmark) Alexandra Bøje	15–21, 21–17, 21–11	(gold) Winner

=== BWF International Challenge/Series (4 titles, 3 runners-up) ===
Men's doubles
Year	Tournament	Partner	Opponent	Score	Result
2017	Malaysia International	(Malaysia) Soh Wooi Yik	(Malaysia) Lee Jian Yi (Malaysia) Lim Zhen Ting	22–24, 19–21	(silver) Runner-up
2017	Waikato International	(Malaysia) Soh Wooi Yik	(Chinese Taipei) Su Li-wei (Chinese Taipei) Ye Hong-wei	16–21, 21–17, 19–21	(silver) Runner-up

Mixed doubles
Year	Tournament	Partner	Opponent	Score	Result
2017	India International	(Malaysia) Goh Liu Ying	(India) Rohan Kapoor (India) Kuhoo Garg	21–19, 21–13	(gold) Winner
2018	Malaysia International	(Malaysia) Peck Yen Wei	(Indonesia) Andika Ramadiansyah (Indonesia) Mychelle Crhystine Bandaso	12–21, 23–21, 21–13	(gold) Winner
2022	Bangladesh International	(Malaysia) Toh Ee Wei	(Thailand) Phatharathorn Nipornram (Thailand) Alisa Sapniti	21–15, 21–13	(gold) Winner
2022	Malaysia International	(Malaysia) Toh Ee Wei	(Malaysia) Hoo Pang Ron (Malaysia) Teoh Mei Xing	21–18, 15–21, 19–21	(silver) Runner-up
2023	Iran Fajr International	(Malaysia) Toh Ee Wei	(Malaysia) Hoo Pang Ron (Malaysia) Teoh Mei Xing	21–19, 21–15	(gold) Winner

BWF International Challenge tournament
BWF International Series tournament
BWF Future Series tournament

== Honours ==
=== Honours of Malaysia ===
- Perak
  - Distinguished Conduct Medal (PPT) (2025)
