= 2016 Badminton Asia Junior Championships – Boys' doubles =

Tournament details
- Dates: 13 – 17 July 2016
- Edition: 19
- Venue: CPB Badminton and Sports Science Training Center
- Location: Bangkok, Thailand

The boys' doubles tournament of the 2016 Badminton Asia Junior Championships was held from July 13–17 at the CPB Badminton and Sports Science Training Center, Bangkok. The defending champions of the last edition is He Jiting and Zheng Siwei from China. He Jiting / Tan Qiang of China and Pakin Kuna-Anuvit / Natthapat Trinkajee of Thailand leads the seeding this year. The runner-up in the last edition Han Chengkai and Zhou Haodong of China emerged as the champion after upset their teammates, the first seeded He and Tan in the finals with the score 21–12, 21–17.

== Seeded ==
1. (China) He Jiting / Tan Qiang (final)
2. (Thailand) Pakin Kuna-Anuvit / Natthapat Trinkajee (third round)
3. (China) Han Chengkai / Zhou Haodong (champion)
4. (Indonesia) Andika Ramadiansyah / Rinov Rivaldy (quarter final)
5. (Thailand) Warit Sarapat / Panachai Worasaktyanan (third round)
6. (Malaysia) Ooi Zi Heng / Soh Wooi Yik (semi final)
7. (India) Krishna Prasad Garaga / Dhruv Kapila (third round)
8. (China) Fan Qiuyue / Ren Xiangyu (semi final)

== Draw ==
=== Finals ===
Quarterfinals
1	(China) He Jiting (China) Tan Qiang	21	11	21
(Japan) Hiroki Okamura (Japan) Masayuki Onodera	14	21	13
4	(Indonesia) Andika Ramadiansyah (Indonesia) Rinov Rivaldy	17	19
8	(China) Fan Qiuyue (China) Ren Xiangyu	21	21
(Japan) Kyohei Yamashita (Japan) Naoki Yamazawa	14	22
3	(China) Han Chengkai (China) Zhou Haodong	21	24
6	(Malaysia) Ooi Zi Heng (Malaysia) Soh Wooi Yik	17	21	21
(South Korea) Lee Sang-min (South Korea) Na Sung-seung	21	14	19

Semifinals
1	(China) He Jiting (China) Tan Qiang	21	21
8	(China) Fan Qiuyue (China) Ren Xiangyu	10	16
3	(China) Han Chengkai (China) Zhou Haodong	21	21
6	(Malaysia) Ooi Zi Heng (Malaysia) Soh Wooi Yik	15	17

Final
1	(China) He Jiting (China) Tan Qiang	12	17
3	(China) Han Chengkai (China) Zhou Haodong	21	21

=== Section 1 ===
First round
1	(China) He JT (China) Tan Q
BYE
(Sri Lanka) S Gunatilleke (Sri Lanka) G Moragoda
BYE
(South Korea) Kang M-h (South Korea) Kim W-h
BYE
(Pakistan) A Jalal (Pakistan) Z Khalil	12	13
(Thailand) S Maunglai (Thailand) N Tulamok	21	21

Second round
1	(China) He JT (China) Tan Q	21	21
(Sri Lanka) S Gunatilleke (Sri Lanka) G Moragoda	3	8
(South Korea) Kang M-h (South Korea) Kim W-h	21	21
(Thailand) S Maunglai (Thailand) N Tulamok	9	18

Third round
1	(China) He JT (China) Tan Q	21	21
(South Korea) Kang M-h (South Korea) Kim W-h	18	11

==== Section 2 ====
First round
5	(Thailand) W Sarapat (Thailand) P Worasaktyanan
BYE
(Macau) Ao FL (Macau) Lam HH
(Philippines) M Alcala (Philippines) N Tapales	wo
(Japan) H Okamura (Japan) M Onodera
BYE
(Hong Kong) Chow HL (Hong Kong) Lam WL	12	21	16
(Malaysia) Chang YJ (Malaysia) Ng EC	21	21	21

Second round
5	(Thailand) W Sarapat (Thailand) P Worasaktyanan	21	21
(Macau) Ao FL (Macau) Lam HH	12	10
(Japan) H Okamura (Japan) M Onodera	24	21
(Malaysia) Chang YJ (Malaysia) Ng EC	22	18

Third round
5	(Thailand) W Sarapat (Thailand) P Worasaktyanan	13	18
(Japan) H Okamura (Japan) M Onodera	21	21

==== Section 3 ====
First round
4	(Indonesia) A Ramadiansyah (Indonesia) R Rivaldy
BYE
(India) C Kumar (India) B Yadav
BYE
(Thailand) K Cheiklinthes (Thailand) W Inkaew
BYE
(Singapore) R Loh (Singapore) D Ng	21	15
(Myanmar) Aung MH (Myanmar) Phone PN	23	21

Second round
4	(Indonesia) A Ramadiansyah (Indonesia) R Rivaldy	21	21
(India) C Kumar (India) B Yadav	10	18
(Thailand) K Cheiklinthes (Thailand) W Inkaew	14	12
(Myanmar) Aung MH (Myanmar) Phone PN	21	21

Third round
4	(Indonesia) A Ramadiansyah (Indonesia) R Rivaldy	21	21
(Myanmar) Aung MH (Myanmar) Phone PN	13	15

==== Section 4 ====
First round
8	(China) Fan QY (China) Ren XY
BYE
(Malaysia) Chen TJ (Malaysia) Hoo PR
(Mongolia) T Boldbaatar (Mongolia) G Enkhjargal	wo
(Chinese Taipei) Chen S-c (Chinese Taipei) Liang H-c
BYE
(Sri Lanka) O De Silva (Sri Lanka) R Sasindu	14	21	14
(Kazakhstan) D Panarin (Kazakhstan) I Yuldashev	21	19	21

Second round
8	(China) Fan QY (China) Ren XY	21	21
(Malaysia) Chen TJ (Malaysia) Hoo PR	18	13
(Chinese Taipei) Chen S-c (Chinese Taipei) Liang H-c	21	21
(Kazakhstan) D Panarin (Kazakhstan) I Yuldashev	17	15

Third round
8	(China) Fan QY (China) Ren XY	21	21
(Chinese Taipei) Chen S-c (Chinese Taipei) Liang H-c	13	15

=== Bottom half ===
==== Section 5 ====
First round
(Indonesia) C Kristanto (Indonesia) B Maulana	21	17	16
(Japan) K Yamashita (Japan) N Yamazawa	13	21	21
BYE
(Pakistan) S Iftikhar (Pakistan) S Jamil
(Chinese Taipei) Lu M-c (Chinese Taipei) Yang C-h	21	21
(Hong Kong) Ko SH (Hong Kong) Lui CW	13	17
BYE
7	(India) K Garaga (India) D Kapila

Second round
(Japan) K Yamashita (Japan) N Yamazawa	21	21
(Pakistan) S Iftikhar (Pakistan) S Jamil	9	7
(Chinese Taipei) Lu M-c (Chinese Taipei) Yang C-h	18	18
7	(India) K Garaga (India) D Kapila	21	21

Third round
(Japan) K Yamashita (Japan) N Yamazawa	21	19	21
7	(India) K Garaga (India) D Kapila	15	21	15

==== Section 6 ====
First round
(Singapore) A Kwek (Singapore) Lee JL	21	21
(Thailand) K Srihong (Thailand) P Wannalee	16	16
BYE
(South Korea) Kim M-j (South Korea) Lee H-b
BYE
(Macau) Che PN (Macau) Pui PF
BYE
3	(China) Han CK (China) Zhou HD

Second round
(Singapore) A Kwek (Singapore) Lee JL	21	17	18
(South Korea) Kim M-j (South Korea) Lee H-b	16	21	21
(Macau) Che PN (Macau) Pui PF	10	10
3	(China) Han CK (China) Zhou HD	21	21

Third round
(South Korea) Kim M-j (South Korea) Lee H-b	19	10
3	(China) Han CK (China) Zhou HD	21	21

==== Section 7 ====
First round
(Japan) M Kaneko (Japan) Y Kubota
(Philippines) F Gabuelo (Philippines) S Padiz	wo
BYE
(Indonesia) R Adam (Indonesia) M Fachrikar
(Chinese Taipei) Su L-w (Chinese Taipei) Ye H-w	21	21
(Vietnam) Le DP (Vietnam) Dang QH	14	17
BYE
6	(Malaysia) Ooi ZH (Malaysia) Soh WY

Second round
(Japan) M Kaneko (Japan) Y Kubota	17	21	15
(Indonesia) R Adam (Indonesia) M Fachrikar	21	16	21
(Chinese Taipei) Su L-w (Chinese Taipei) Ye H-w	17	12
6	(Malaysia) Ooi ZH (Malaysia) Soh WY	21	21

Third round
(Indonesia) R Adam (Indonesia) M Fachrikar	17	13
6	(Malaysia) Ooi ZH (Malaysia) Soh WY	21	21

==== Section 8 ====
First round
(South Korea) Lee S-m (South Korea) Na S-s	21	21
(Sri Lanka) T Ambedoga (Sri Lanka) M Dulanjana	6	12
BYE
(Singapore) M Tan (Singapore) Toh HZ
BYE
(Myanmar) Arkar PM (Myanmar) Hein STT
BYE
2	(Thailand) P Kuna-Anuvit (Thailand) N Trinkajee

Second round
(South Korea) Lee S-m (South Korea) Na S-s	21	21
(Singapore) M Tan (Singapore) Toh HZ	18	12
(Myanmar) Arkar PM (Myanmar) Hein STT	10	12
2	(Thailand) P Kuna-Anuvit (Thailand) N Trinkajee	21	21

Third round
(South Korea) Lee S-m (South Korea) Na S-s	16	21	21
2	(Thailand) P Kuna-Anuvit (Thailand) N Trinkajee	21	17	19
