= 2015 Badminton Asia Junior Championships – Mixed doubles =

Tournament details
- Dates: 1 – 5 July 2015
- Edition: 18
- Venue: CPB Badminton and Sports Science Training Center
- Location: Bangkok, Thailand

The mixed doubles tournament of the 2015 Badminton Asia Junior Championships was held from July 1 to 5. The defending champions of the last edition were Zheng Siwei and Chen Qingchen of China. As the defending champion Chen Qingchen try to defend their title that she got last year with Huang Kaixiang, but this time with different partner Zheng Siwei (seeded No.1). Chen finally emerge as the mixed doubles champion for the second time after she and Zheng defeat the second seeds from South Korea Choi Jong-woo and Kim Hye-jeong in the finals with the score 21–8, 21–12.

== Seeded ==
1. (China) Zheng Siwei / Chen Qingchen (champion)
2. (South Korea) Choi Jong-woo / Kim Hye-jeong (final)
3. (India) Arjun Madathil Ramachandran / Kuhoo Garg (second round)
4. (Indonesia) Beno Drajat / Yulfira Barkah (quarter final)
5. (Indonesia) Yantoni Edy Saputra / Marsheilla Gischa Islami (second round)
6. (Thailand) Pakin Kuna-Anuvit / Kwanchanok Sudjaipraparat (first round)
7. (Indonesia) Fachriza Abimanyu / Apriani Rahayu (semi final)
8. (China) He Jiting / Du Yue (semi final)

== Draw ==
=== Finals ===
Quarterfinals
1	(China) Zheng Siwei (China) Chen Qingchen	21	21
(Thailand) Kantawat Leelavechabutr (Thailand) Kilasu Ostermeyer	11	9
(Malaysia) Goh Sze Fei (Malaysia) Teoh Mei Xing	16	21	17
7	(Indonesia) Fachriza Abimanyu (Indonesia) Apriani Rahayu	21	19	21
8	(China) He Jiting (China) Du Yue	21	21
4	(Indonesia) Beno Drajat (Indonesia) Yulfira Barkah	11	15
(Malaysia) Tan Jinn Hwa (Malaysia) Goh Jin Wei	17	16
2	(South Korea) Choi Jong-woo (South Korea) Kim Hye-jeong	21	21

Semifinals
1	(China) Zheng Siwei (China) Chen Qingchen	21	21
7	(Indonesia) Fachriza Abimanyu (Indonesia) Apriani Rahayu	14	14
8	(China) He Jiting (China) Du Yue	18	15
2	(South Korea) Choi Jong-woo (South Korea) Kim Hye-jeong	21	21

Final
1	(China) Zheng Siwei (China) Chen Qingchen	21	21
2	(South Korea) Choi Jong-woo (South Korea) Kim Hye-jeong	8	12

=== Top half ===
==== Section 1 ====
First round
(Philippines) C Bernardo (Philippines) E C Inlayo	21	21
(Malaysia) Ooi Z H (Malaysia) Ooi S H	10	15
(Chinese Taipei) Hung T-w (Chinese Taipei) Tai w-l	11	21	14
(Thailand) K Tantianankul (Thailand) S Katethong	21	15	21
(Vietnam) Le D P (Vietnam) Nguyen T P H	21	21
(Hong Kong) Lam W L (Hong Kong) Yeung S Y	13	10

Second round
1	(China) Zheng SW (China) Chen QC	21	21
(Philippines) C Bernardo (Philippines) E C Inlayo	11	7
(Thailand) K Tantianankul (Thailand) S Katethong	21	21
(Vietnam) Le D P (Vietnam) Nguyen T P H	13	18

Third round
1	(China) Zheng SW (China) Chen QC	21	21
(Thailand) K Tantianankul (Thailand) S Katethong	8	16

==== Section 2 ====
First round
(Singapore) J Wong (Singapore) E Chua	21	21
(Kazakhstan) I Yuldashev (Kazakhstan) D Fakhrutdinova	6	5
(Thailand) K Leelavechabutr (Thailand) K Ostermeyer	9	21	21
(South Korea) Park K-h (South Korea) Park K-h	21	14	19
(Sri Lanka) R R De Silva (Sri Lanka) H C Wijayarathne	5	5
(Japan) S Morioka (Japan) C Shida	21	21

Second round
5	(Indonesia) Y E Saputra (Indonesia) M G Islami	21	14	17
(Singapore) J Wong (Singapore) E Chua	13	21	21
(Thailand) K Leelavechabutr (Thailand) K Ostermeyer	21	21
(Japan) S Morioka (Japan) C Shida	17	19

Third round
(Singapore) J Wong (Singapore) E Chua	22	21	21
(Thailand) K Leelavechabutr (Thailand) K Ostermeyer	24	10	23

==== Section 3 ====
First round
(Thailand) P Worasaktyanan (Thailand) R Iamratanamaetheekul	21	21
(Turkmenistan) K Atliyev (Turkmenistan) A Klychkova	2	4
(China) Dong WJ (China) Chen L	21	21
(Mongolia) D Davaadorj (Mongolia) O Janchiv	2	6
(Malaysia) Goh S F (Malaysia) Teoh M X	21	21
(Chinese Taipei) Po L-w (Chinese Taipei) Chen W-t	9	18

Second round
3	(India) A M Ramachandran (India) K Garg	14	16
(Thailand) P Worasaktyanan (Thailand) R Iamratanamaetheekul	21	21
(China) Dong WJ (China) Chen L	17	17
(Malaysia) Goh S F (Malaysia) Teoh M X	21	21

Third round
(Thailand) P Worasaktyanan (Thailand) R Iamratanamaetheekul	12	10
(Malaysia) Goh S F (Malaysia) Teoh M X	21	21

==== Section 4 ====
First round
7	(Indonesia) F Abimanyu (Indonesia) A Rahayu	21	21
(Philippines) V R Manuel (Philippines) J G De Vera	9	14
(Japan) M Onodera (Japan) N Sone	21	21
(Sri Lanka) S H De Silva (Sri Lanka) H N Ambalangodage	11	14
(Hong Kong) Li K H (Hong Kong) Yeung N T	21	21
(Nepal) N Devkota (Nepal) S Mukhiya	5	8
(South Korea) Lee H-s (South Korea) Seong N-y	21	21
(Macau) Lou H M (Macau) Ng W C	14	8

Second round
7	(Indonesia) F Abimanyu (Indonesia) A Rahayu	21	21
(Japan) M Onodera (Japan) N Sone	19	17
(Hong Kong) Li K H (Hong Kong) Yeung N T	18	21	17
(South Korea) Lee H-s (South Korea) Seong N-y	21	13	21

Third round
7	(Indonesia) F Abimanyu (Indonesia) A Rahayu	21	20	22
(South Korea) Lee H-s (South Korea) Seong N-y	16	22	20

=== Bottom half ===
==== Section 5 ====
First round
(Chinese Taipei) Lin Y-f (Chinese Taipei) Chao P-c	21	14	23
(Thailand) A Namkul (Thailand) P Chochuwong	17	21	21
(South Korea) Lim S-m (South Korea) Kim H-i	21	21
(Vietnam) Le D N (Vietnam) Pham T K	17	16
(Singapore) Lee J L (Singapore) C Wong	13	20
(India) S Sharma (India) P Dandu	21	22
(Hong Kong) Chan Y C (Hong Kong) Fan K Y	21	10
8	(China) He JT (China) Du Y	23	21

Second round
(Chinese Taipei) Lin Y-f (Chinese Taipei) Chao P-c	11	15
(South Korea) Lim S-m (South Korea) Kim H-i	21	21
(India) S Sharma (India) P Dandu	19	21	9
8	(China) He JT (China) Du Y	21	19	21

Third round
(South Korea) Lim S-m (South Korea) Kim H-i	11	9
8	(China) He JT (China) Du Y	21	21

==== Section 6 ====
First round
(Sri Lanka) S Rajapakse (Sri Lanka) T A Ratnayaka	8	9
(Japan) K Sakai (Japan) H Saito	21	21
(Macau) Iek U I (Macau) Gong X X	16	14
(Philippines) J R Deato (Philippines) T M Pomar	21	21
(Thailand) P Nipornram (Thailand) R Laisuan	21	17	21
(Malaysia) A Chia (Malaysia) Tew J J	9	21	14

Second round
(Japan) K Sakai (Japan) H Saito	21	21
(Philippines) J R Deato (Philippines) T M Pomar	17	12
(Thailand) P Nipornram (Thailand) R Laisuan	13	21	19
4	(Indonesia) B Drajat (Indonesia) Y Barkah	21	12	21

Third round
(Japan) K Sakai (Japan) H Saito	14	16
4	(Indonesia) B Drajat (Indonesia) Y Barkah	21	21

==== Section 7 ====
First round
(Mongolia) G Dashnyam (Mongolia) N Bayarsaikhan	9	6
(Sri Lanka) P K Amaranayake (Sri Lanka) D Dias	21	21
(Chinese Taipei) Yang M-t (Chinese Taipei) Jhou S-j	21	21
(Nepal) D Dhami (Nepal) S Shrestha	8	10
(Malaysia) Tan J H (Malaysia) Goh J W	21	21
(Indonesia) Z Habibi (Indonesia) S Fauziah	16	16
(Philippines) A Morada (Philippines) A Y Leonardo	21	21
6	(Thailand) P Kuna-Anuvit (Thailand) K Sudjaipraparat	16	19

Second round
(Sri Lanka) P K Amaranayake (Sri Lanka) D Dias	14	10
(Chinese Taipei) Yang M-t (Chinese Taipei) Jhou S-j	21	21
(Malaysia) Tan J H (Malaysia) Goh J W	21	21
(Philippines) A Morada (Philippines) A Y Leonardo	12	13

Third round
(Chinese Taipei) Yang M-t (Chinese Taipei) Jhou S-j	9	15
(Malaysia) Tan J H (Malaysia) Goh J W	21	21

==== Section 8 ====
First round
(Kazakhstan) O Yermakov (Kazakhstan) M Smagulova	5	4
(Hong Kong) Y Chung (Hong Kong) Ng T Y	21	21
(China) Han CK (China) An Y	21	21
(Turkmenistan) N Apov (Turkmenistan) Y Sarkisyan	2	1
(Japan) K Watanabe (Japan) N Matsuyama	21	21
(Macau) Che P N (Macau) Chan K L	7	3

Second round
(Hong Kong) Y Chung (Hong Kong) Ng T Y	20	26	21
(China) Han CK (China) An Y	22	24	18
(Japan) K Watanabe (Japan) N Matsuyama	20	16
2	(South Korea) Choi J-w (South Korea) Kim H-j	22	21

Third round
(Hong Kong) Y Chung (Hong Kong) Ng T Y	15	15
2	(South Korea) Choi J-w (South Korea) Kim H-j	21	21
