= Andika Ramadiansyah =

Australian badminton player (born 1998)

Personal information
- Born: 6 January 1998 (age 28) Bogor, West Java, Indonesia
- Height: 1.74 m (5 ft 9 in)

Sport
- Country: Australia
- Sport: Badminton
- Handedness: Right
- Coached by: Nova Widianto

Men's & Mixed doubles
- Highest ranking: 134 (MD, 1 September 2016); 53 (XD with Nozomi Shimizu, 3 November 2026); 59 (XD with Mychelle Crhystine Bandaso, 20 September 2018)
- Current ranking: 53 (XD with Nozomi Shimizu, 3 November 2026)
- BWF profile
Medal record
Men's badminton
Representing Australia
Oceania Championships
Gold medal – first place	2026 Auckland	Mixed doubles
Oceania Men's Team Championships
Gold medal – first place	2026 Auckland	Men's team
Representing Indonesia
World Junior Championships
Silver medal – second place	2015 Lima	Mixed team
Asia Junior Championships
Bronze medal – third place	2015 Bangkok	Mixed team

Andika Ramadiansyah (born 6 January 1998) is an Indonesian-born Australian badminton player affiliated with the PB Djarum club.

== Achievements ==
=== Oceania Championships ===
Mixed doubles
Year	Venue	Partner	Opponent	Score	Result	Ref.
2026	Badminton North Harbour Centre; Auckland, New Zealand	(Australia) Angela Yu	(New Zealand) Ricky Cheng (New Zealand) Natalie Ting	21–13, 21–16	Gold	

=== BWF International Challenge/Series (4 titles, 5 runners-up) ===
Mixed doubles
Year	Tournament	Partner	Opponent	Score	Result
2016	Vietnam International	(Indonesia) Angelica Wiratama	(Indonesia) Rinov Rivaldy (Indonesia) Vania Arianti Sukoco	15–21, 20–22	(silver) Runner-up
2017	Singapore International	(Indonesia) Mychelle Crhystine Bandaso	(Hong Kong) Chang Tak Ching (Hong Kong) Ng Wing Yung	21–16, 21–18	(gold) Winner
2018	Malaysia International	(Indonesia) Mychelle Crhystine Bandaso	(Malaysia) Chen Tang Jie (Malaysia) Peck Yen Wei	21–12, 21–23, 13–21	(silver) Runner-up
2018	Malaysia International	(Indonesia) Bunga Fitriani Romadhini	(Indonesia) Fachryza Abimanyu (Indonesia) Mychelle Crhystine Bandaso	19–21, 21–15, 21–13	(gold) Winner
2019	Malaysia International	(Indonesia) Bunga Fitriani Romadhini	(Indonesia) Amri Syahnawi (Indonesia) Pia Zebadiah Bernadet	15–21, 17–21	(silver) Runner-up
2024	Sydney International	(Australia) Nozomi Shimizu	(Chinese Taipei) Chen Cheng-kuan (Chinese Taipei) Hsu Yin-hui	24–26, 21–11, 11–21	(silver) Runner-up
2025	North Harbour International	(Australia) Nozomi Shimizu	(Chinese Taipei) Lin Yu-chieh (Chinese Taipei) Lee Chih-chen	14–21, 10–21	(silver) Runner-up
2026	North Harbour International	(Australia) Nozomi Shimizu	(Chinese Taipei) Lin Bing-wei (Chinese Taipei) Liao Jui-chi	21–10, 21–18	(gold) Winner
2026	Bendigo International	(Australia) Nozomi Shimizu	(Chinese Taipei) Lin Bing-wei (Chinese Taipei) Lin Yen-yu	21–12, 21–14	(gold) Winner

BWF International Challenge tournament
BWF International Series tournament
BWF Future Series tournament

== Performance timeline ==
=== Indonesian team ===
- Junior level

Team events	2015	2016
Asian Junior Championships	B	A
World Junior Championships	S	QF

=== Australian team ===
- Senior level

Team events	2026	Ref
Oceania Men's Team Championships	G	
Thomas Cup	GS	

=== Individual competitions ===
==== Junior level ====
===== Boys' doubles =====
Events	2015	2016
Asian Junior Championships	2R	QF
World Junior Championships	2R	QF

===== Mixed doubles =====
Events	2015	2016
Asian Junior Championships	A	QF
World Junior Championships	4R	4R

==== Senior level ====
===== Men's doubles =====
Events	2026	Ref
Oceania Championships	QF	

Tournament	BWF Superseries / Grand Prix						BWF World Tour							Best	Ref
Tournament	2014	2015	2016	2017	2018	2019	2020	2021	2022	2023	2024	2025	2026	Best	Ref
Indonesia Masters	1R	1R	A	NH	A									1R ('14, '15)	
Singapore Open	A				1R	A	NH		A					1R ('18)	
Australian Open	A						NH		A		QF	A	1R	QF ('24)	
Vietnam Open	A			Q2	Q1	A	NH		A					Q2 ('17)	
Year-end ranking	539	373	170	591	409	—N/a	—N/a	—N/a	448	403	156	569		134	

===== Mixed doubles =====
Events	2026	Ref
Oceania Championships	G	

Tournament	BWF Superseries / Grand Prix		BWF World Tour									Best	Ref
Tournament	2016	2017	2018	2019	2020	2021	2022	2023	2024	2025	2026	Best	Ref
Indonesia Masters	1R	NH	1R	1R	A							1R ('16, '18, '19)	
Thailand Masters	A					NH		A			1R	1R ('26)	
Orléans Masters	NA		QF	1R	NH	A						QF ('18)	
Thailand Open	A	Q2	1R	A		NH	A					1R ('18)	
Singapore Open	A		1R	A	NH		A					1R ('18)	
Australian Open	A				NH		1R	A		2R	1R	2R ('25)	
Macau Open	A				NH				A		1R	1R ('26)	
Taipei Open	A				NH		A				1R	1R ('26)	
Korea Masters	A				NH		A				2R	2R ('26)	
Indonesia Masters Super 100	NA		SF	2R	NH		A					SF ('18)	
Vietnam Open	A	1R	1R	A	NH		A					1R ('17, '18)	
Korea Open	A				NH		A				1R	1R ('26)	
Syed Modi International	A				NH		A			QF		QF ('25)	
Guwahati Masters	NH							A		2R		2R ('25)	
Hyderabad Open	NA		A	QF	NH		NA					QF ('19)	
Year-end ranking	128	95	72	92	93	121	389	740	200	76		53	
