= Hu Yuxiang =

Chinese badminton player (born 1998)

Hu Yuxiang 胡羽翔
Personal information
- Born: 22 May 1998 (age 28) Dongguan, Guangdong
- Height: 1.66 m (5 ft 5 in)

Sport
- Country: China
- Sport: Badminton

Women's & mixed doubles
- Highest ranking: 233 (WD) 9 Jun 2016; 167 (XD) 22 Sep 2016
- BWF profile
Medal record
Badminton
Representing China
World Junior Championships
Gold medal – first place	2016 Bilbao	Mixed team
Silver medal – second place	2016 Bilbao	Mixed doubles
Asia Junior Championships
Gold medal – first place	2016 Bangkok	Mixed team
Bronze medal – third place	2016 Bangkok	Mixed doubles

Hu Yuxiang (Chinese: 胡羽翔, born 22 May 1998) is a Chinese female badminton player.

== Achievements ==
=== BWF World Junior Championships ===
Mixed doubles
Year	Venue	Partner	Opponent	Score	Result
2016	Bilbao Arena; Bilbao, Spain	(China) Zhou Haodong	(China) He Jiting (China) Du Yue	13–21, 15–21	Silver

=== Asian Junior Championships ===
Mixed doubles
Year	Venue	Partner	Opponent	Score	Result
2016	CPB Badminton Training Center; Bangkok, Thailand	(China) Zhou Haodong	(China) He Jiting (China) Du Yue	14–21, 12–21	Bronze

=== BWF International Challenge/Series ===
Women's doubles
Year	Tournament	Partner	Opponent	Score	Result
2016	China International	(China) Xu Ya	(China) Chen Qingchen (China) Jia Yifan	8–21, 10–21	(silver) Runner-up

BWF International Challenge tournament
BWF International Series tournament
