= 2016 BWF World Junior Championships =

Tournament details
- Dates: 2–12 November 2016
- Edition: 18th
- Level: International
- Venue: Bilbao Arena
- Location: Bilbao, Biscay, Spain

The 2016 BWF World Junior Championships is the eighteenth tournament of the BWF World Junior Championships. It was held in Bilbao, Spain at the Bilbao Arena between 2–12 November 2016.

== Host city selection ==
Bilbao (Spain) and Yogyakarta (Indonesia) submitted bids to host the competition. Badminton World Federation later awarded the event to Bilbao while Yogyakarta was appointed as host for the next edition. According to the Indonesian delegation, the Spanish bid for the 2016 edition was approved due to fears of political instability should Bilbao awarded the 2017 edition.

== Medalists ==
| Event | Gold | Silver | Bronze |
|---|---|---|---|
| Teams | China; Fan Qiuyue; Han Chengkai; He Jiting; Lei Lanxi; Liu Haichao; Ren Xiangyu; Sun Feixiang; Tan Qiang; Zhou Haodong; Zhu Junhao; Cai Yanyan; Chen Yufei; Du Yue; Fu Xue; Gao Fangjie; Hu Yuxiang; Ni Bowen; Shen Lingjie; Xu Ya; Zhou Chaomin | Malaysia; Chen Tang Jie; Hoo Pang Ron; Lee Zii Jia; Leong Jun Hao; Man Wei Chong; Ooi Zi Heng; Sim Fong Hau; Soh Wooi Yik; Zainuddin Ameer Amri; Goh Jin Wei; Thinaah Muralitharan; Pearly Tan Koong Le; Tan Sueh Jeou; Toh Ee Wei | Japan; Mahiro Kaneko; Yunosuke Kubota; Kodai Naraoka; Sumiya Nihei; Hiroki Okamura; Masayuki Onodera; Koki Watanabe; Naoki Yamazawa; Shiori Ebihara; Sayaka Hobara; Minami Kawashima; Nami Matsuyama; Natsuki Nidaira; Natsuki Sone; Asuka Takahashi; Natsumi Uesugi |
| Teams | China; Fan Qiuyue; Han Chengkai; He Jiting; Lei Lanxi; Liu Haichao; Ren Xiangyu; Sun Feixiang; Tan Qiang; Zhou Haodong; Zhu Junhao; Cai Yanyan; Chen Yufei; Du Yue; Fu Xue; Gao Fangjie; Hu Yuxiang; Ni Bowen; Shen Lingjie; Xu Ya; Zhou Chaomin | Malaysia; Chen Tang Jie; Hoo Pang Ron; Lee Zii Jia; Leong Jun Hao; Man Wei Chong; Ooi Zi Heng; Sim Fong Hau; Soh Wooi Yik; Zainuddin Ameer Amri; Goh Jin Wei; Thinaah Muralitharan; Pearly Tan Koong Le; Tan Sueh Jeou; Toh Ee Wei | Thailand; Pakin Kuna-Anuvit; Korakrit Laotrakul; Pachaarapol Nipornram; Warit Sarapat; Natthapat Trinkajee; Kunlavut Vitidsarn; Kantaphon Wangcharoen; Panachai Worasaktayanan; Nuntakarn Aimsaard; Phittayaporn Chaiwan; Pattaranan Chamnaktan; Pornpawee Chochuwong; Chasinee Korepap; Ruethaichanok Laisuan; Alisa Sapniti; Kwanchanok Sudjaipraparat |
| Boys' singles | (China) Sun Feixiang | (Indonesia) Chico Aura Dwi Wardoyo | (Thailand) Kantaphon Wangcharoen |
| Boys' singles | (China) Sun Feixiang | (Indonesia) Chico Aura Dwi Wardoyo | (Malaysia) Lee Zii Jia |
| Girls' singles | (China) Chen Yufei | (Thailand) Pornpawee Chochuwong | (Japan) Natsuki Oie |
| Girls' singles | (China) Chen Yufei | (Thailand) Pornpawee Chochuwong | (South Korea) Kim Ga-eun |
| Boys' doubles | (China) Han Chengkai (China) Zhou Haodong | (South Korea) Lee Hong-sub (South Korea) Lim Su-min | (Thailand) Pakin Kuna-Anuvit (Thailand) Natthapat Trinkajee |
| Boys' doubles | (China) Han Chengkai (China) Zhou Haodong | (South Korea) Lee Hong-sub (South Korea) Lim Su-min | (China) Fan Qiuyue (China) Ren Xiangyu |
| Girls' doubles | (Japan) Sayaka Hobara (Japan) Nami Matsuyama | (China) Du Yue (China) Xu Ya | (South Korea) Kim Ga-eun (South Korea) Kim Hyang-im |
| Girls' doubles | (Japan) Sayaka Hobara (Japan) Nami Matsuyama | (China) Du Yue (China) Xu Ya | (Indonesia) Yulfira Barkah (Indonesia) Jauza Fadhila Sugiarto |
| Mixed doubles | (China) He Jiting (China) Du Yue | (China) Zhou Haodong (China) Hu Yuxiang | (Malaysia) Chen Tang Jie (Malaysia) Toh Ee Wei |
| Mixed doubles | (China) He Jiting (China) Du Yue | (China) Zhou Haodong (China) Hu Yuxiang | (South Korea) Park Kyung-hoon (South Korea) Kim Hye-jeong |

== Medal table ==
| Rank | Nation | Gold | Silver | Bronze | Total |
|---|---|---|---|---|---|
| 1 | China (CHN) | 5 | 2 | 1 | 8 |
| 2 | Japan (JPN) | 1 | 0 | 2 | 3 |
| 3 | South Korea (KOR) | 0 | 1 | 3 | 4 |
| 3 | Thailand (THA) | 0 | 1 | 3 | 4 |
| 5 | Malaysia (MAS) | 0 | 1 | 2 | 3 |
| 6 | Indonesia (INA) | 0 | 1 | 1 | 2 |
| Totals (6 entries) | | 6 | 6 | 12 | 24 |
