= Du Yue =

Chinese badminton player (born 1998)

Du Yue 杜玥
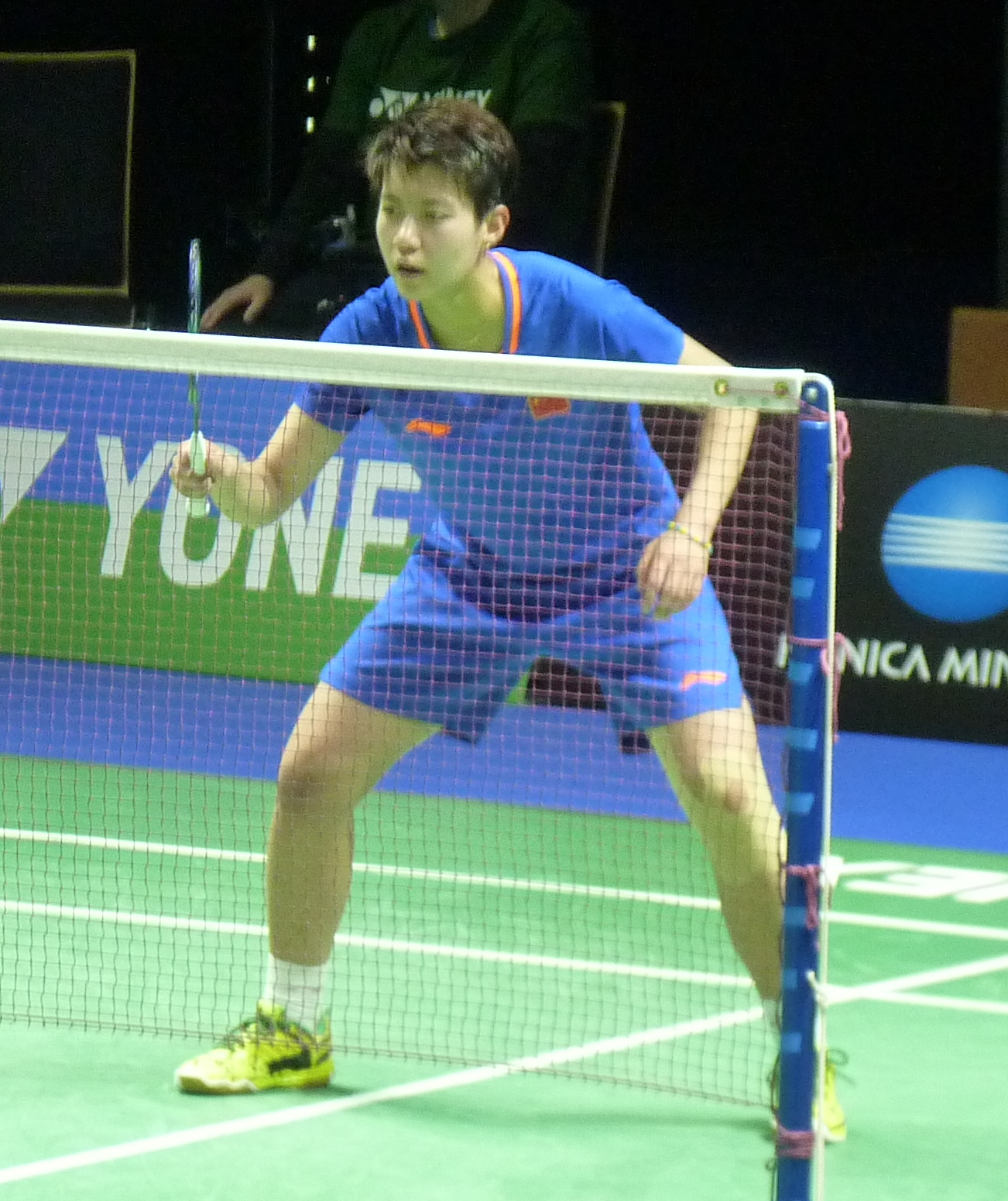
- Du during the 2019 German Open

Personal information
- Born: 15 February 1998 (age 28) Yichang, Hubei, China
- Height: 1.68 m (5 ft 6 in)

Sport
- Country: China
- Sport: Badminton

Women's & mixed doubles
- Highest ranking: 5 (WD with Li Yinhui 17 March 2020); 8 (XD with He Jiting 31 May 2018)
- BWF profile
Medal record
Women's badminton
Representing China
World Championships
Bronze medal – third place	2019 Basel	Women's doubles
Sudirman Cup
Gold medal – first place	2019 Nanning	Mixed team
Gold medal – first place	2021 Vantaa	Mixed team
Uber Cup
Silver medal – second place	2022 Bangkok	Women's team
Asian Championships
Silver medal – second place	2019 Wuhan	Mixed doubles
Bronze medal – third place	2022 Manila	Women's doubles
Asia Mixed Team Championships
Gold medal – first place	2019 Hong Kong	Mixed team
Asia Team Championships
Silver medal – second place	2018 Alor Setar	Women's team
World University Games
Silver medal – second place	2021 Chengdu	Women's doubles
Silver medal – second place	2021 Chengdu	Mixed team
World Junior Championships
Gold medal – first place	2014 Alor Setar	Mixed team
Gold medal – first place	2015 Lima	Mixed team
Gold medal – first place	2016 Bilbao	Mixed doubles
Gold medal – first place	2016 Bilbao	Mixed team
Silver medal – second place	2015 Lima	Girls' doubles
Silver medal – second place	2016 Bilbao	Girls' doubles
Bronze medal – third place	2014 Alor Setar	Girls' doubles
Asian Junior Championships
Gold medal – first place	2014 Taipei	Mixed team
Gold medal – first place	2015 Bangkok	Girls' doubles
Gold medal – first place	2015 Bangkok	Mixed team
Gold medal – first place	2016 Bangkok	Girls' doubles
Gold medal – first place	2016 Bangkok	Mixed doubles
Gold medal – first place	2016 Bangkok	Mixed team
Silver medal – second place	2014 Taipei	Girls' doubles
Bronze medal – third place	2015 Bangkok	Mixed doubles

Du Yue (Chinese: 杜玥, born 15 February 1998) is a Chinese former badminton player. She won the silver medal at the 2014 Asian Junior Championships in the girls' doubles event partnered with Li Yinhui. She and Li then made it to the gold medal 2015. Du also claimed the girls' doubles gold in 2016 partnered with Xu Ya and doubled-up the title winning mixed doubles gold with He Jiting. She and He Jiting captured the gold medal at the 2016 World Junior Championships, which in the previous year they won the silver medal. She won her first senior international title at the 2017 China International tournament in the women's doubles event partnered with Xu Ya. Du was the mixed doubles silver medalist at the 2019 Asian Championships, and the women's doubles bronze medalist at the 2019 World Championships.

== Career ==
Du competed at the 2020 Summer Olympics in Tokyo, Japan. Partnered with Li Yinhui, they finished as the quarter-finalists after being defeated by the eventual gold medalists Greysia Polii and Apriyani Rahayu of Indonesia in three rubber games.

After Du's retirement from the national team in 2023, she partnered Xia Yuting to participate in the Summer World University Games. They reached the final before bowing out to compatriots Li Wenmei and Liu Xuanxuan in three games.

== Achievements ==
=== BWF World Championships ===
Women's doubles
Year	Venue	Partner	Opponent	Score	Result
2019	St. Jakobshalle, Basel, Switzerland	(China) Li Yinhui	(Japan) Yuki Fukushima (Japan) Sayaka Hirota	11–21, 17–21	Bronze

=== Asian Championships ===
Women's doubles
Year	Venue	Partner	Opponent	Score	Result
2022	Muntinlupa Sports Complex; Metro Manila, Philippines	(China) Li Wenmei	(China) Chen Qingchen (China) Jia Yifan	12–21, 17–21	Bronze

Mixed doubles
Year	Venue	Partner	Opponent	Score	Result
2019	Wuhan Sports Center Gymnasium; Wuhan, China	(China) He Jiting	(China) Wang Yilyu (China) Huang Dongping	11–21, 21–13, 21–23	Silver

=== World University Games ===
Women's doubles
Year	Venue	Partner	Opponent	Score	Result	Ref.
2021	Shuangliu Sports Centre Gymnasium; Chengdu, China	(China) Xia Yuting	(China) Li Wenmei (China) Liu Xuanxuan	21–18, 19–21, 14–21	Silver	

=== World Junior Championships ===
Women's doubles
Year	Venue	Partner	Opponent	Score	Result
2014	Stadium Sultan Abdul Halim; Alor Setar, Malaysia	(China) Li Yinhui	(China) Chen Qingchen (China) Jia Yifan	11–21, 14–21	Bronze
2015	Centro de Alto Rendimiento de la Videna; Lima, Peru	(China) Li Yinhui	(China) Chen Qingchen (China) Jia Yifan	18–21, 21–13, 11–21	Silver
2016	Bilbao Arena; Bilbao, Spain	(China) Xu Ya	(Japan) Sayaka Hobara (Japan) Nami Matsuyama	23–25, 21–19, 14–21	Silver

Mixed doubles
Year	Venue	Partner	Opponent	Score	Result
2015	Centro de Alto Rendimiento de la Videna; Lima, Peru	(China) He Jiting	(China) Zheng Siwei (China) Chen Qingchen	19–21, 8–21	Silver
2016	Bilbao Arena; Bilbao, Spain	(China) He Jiting	(China) Zhou Haodong (China) Hu Yuxiang	21–13, 21–15	Gold

=== Asian Junior Championships ===
Women's doubles
Year	Venue	Partner	Opponent	Score	Result
2014	Taipei Gymnasium; Taipei, Taiwan	(China) Li Yinhui	(China) Chen Qingchen (China) Jia Yifan	11–21, 18–21	Silver
2015	CPB Badminton Training Center; Bangkok, Thailand	(China) Li Yinhui	(China) Chen Qingchen (China) Jia Yifan	21–14, 18–21, 21–18	Gold
2016	CPB Badminton Training Center; Bangkok, Thailand	(China) Xu Ya	(China) Ni Bowen (China) Zhou Chaomin	21–15, 21–16	Gold

Mixed doubles
Year	Venue	Partner	Opponent	Score	Result
2015	CPB Badminton Training Center; Bangkok, Thailand	(China) He Jiting	(South Korea) Choi Jong-woo (South Korea) Kim Hye-jeong	18–21, 15–21	Bronze
2016	CPB Badminton Training Center; Bangkok, Thailand	(China) He Jiting	(South Korea) Kim Won-ho (South Korea) Lee Yu-rim	21–12, 19–21, 21–19	Gold

=== BWF World Tour (4 titles, 6 runners-up) ===
The BWF World Tour, which was announced on 19 March 2017 and implemented in 2018, is a series of elite badminton tournaments sanctioned by the Badminton World Federation (BWF). The BWF World Tour is divided into levels of World Tour Finals, Super 1000, Super 750, Super 500, Super 300, and the BWF Tour Super 100.

Women's doubles
Year	Tournament	Level	Partner	Opponent	Score	Result
2018	Lingshui China Masters	Super 100	(China) Li Yinhui	(China) Huang Dongping (China) Li Wenmei	21–16, 21–17	(gold) Winner
2019	German Open	Super 300	(China) Li Yinhui	(Japan) Misaki Matsutomo (Japan) Ayaka Takahashi	22–20, 21–15	(gold) Winner
2019	Malaysia Open	Super 750	(China) Li Yinhui	(China) Chen Qingchen (China) Jia Yifan	14–21, 15–21	(silver) Runner-up
2019	Thailand Open	Super 500	(China) Li Yinhui	(Japan) Shiho Tanaka (Japan) Koharu Yonemoto	19–21, 21–14, 13–21	(silver) Runner-up
2019	Macau Open	Super 300	(China) Li Yinhui	(Thailand) Jongkolphan Kititharakul (Thailand) Rawinda Prajongjai	21–16, 10–21, 21–12	(gold) Winner
2020	Malaysia Masters	Super 500	(China) Li Yinhui	(China) Li Wenmei (China) Zheng Yu	19–21, 21–16, 19–21	(silver) Runner-up
2020	All England Open	Super 1000	(China) Li Yinhui	(Japan) Yuki Fukushima (Japan) Sayaka Hirota	13–21, 15–21	(silver) Runner-up
2023	Spain Masters	Super 300	(China) Chen Fanghui	(China) Liu Shengshu (China) Tan Ning	8–21, 21–16, 18–21	(silver) Runner-up

Mixed doubles
Year	Tournament	Level	Partner	Opponent	Score	Result
2018	Korea Open	Super 500	(China) He Jiting	(Denmark) Mathias Christiansen (Denmark) Christinna Pedersen	21–18, 21–16	(gold) Winner
2019	Hong Kong Open	Super 500	(China) He Jiting	(Japan) Yuta Watanabe (Japan) Arisa Higashino	20–22, 16–21	(silver) Runner-up

=== BWF Grand Prix (2 titles) ===
The BWF Grand Prix had two levels, the Grand Prix and Grand Prix Gold. It was a series of badminton tournaments sanctioned by the Badminton World Federation (BWF) and played between 2007 and 2017.

Mixed doubles
Year	Tournament	Partner	Opponent	Score	Result
2017	Thailand Open	(China) He Jiting	(Malaysia) Goh Soon Huat (Malaysia) Shevon Jemie Lai	21–13, 16–21, 21–12	(gold) Winner
2017	Bitburger Open	(China) He Jiting	(Denmark) Anders Skaarup Rasmussen (Denmark) Line Kjærsfeldt	21–18, 21–17	(gold) Winner

BWF Grand Prix Gold tournament
BWF Grand Prix tournament

=== BWF International Challenge/Series (1 title) ===
Women's doubles
Year	Tournament	Partner	Opponent	Score	Result
2017	China International	(China) Xu Ya	(China) Chen Lu (China) Zhou Chaomin	9–11, 11–8, 9–11, 11–8, 11–5	(gold) Winner

BWF International Challenge tournament
BWF International Series tournament
