= Zhou Haodong =

Chinese badminton player (born 1998)

Zhou Haodong 周昊东
Personal information
- Born: 20 February 1998 (age 28) Ningbo, Zhejiang, China
- Height: 1.80 m (5 ft 11 in)

Sport
- Country: China
- Sport: Badminton
- Handedness: Right

Men's & mixed doubles
- Highest ranking: 5 (MD with Han Chengkai 9 April 2019); 100 (XD with Xu Ya 19 April 2018)
- Current ranking: 15 (MD with He Jiting), 82 (MD with Tan Qiang (16 January 2024)
- BWF profile
Medal record
Men's badminton
Representing China
Sudirman Cup
Gold medal – first place	2019 Nanning	Mixed team
Gold medal – first place	2021 Vantaa	Mixed team
Thomas Cup
Silver medal – second place	2020 Aarhus	Men's team
Asia Mixed Team Championships
Gold medal – first place	2019 Hong Kong	Mixed team
Gold medal – first place	2023 Dubai	Mixed team
Asia Team Championships
Silver medal – second place	2018 Alor Setar	Men's team
World University Games
Silver medal – second place	2021 Chengdu	Men's doubles
Silver medal – second place	2021 Chengdu	Mixed team
World Junior Championships
Gold medal – first place	2015 Lima	Mixed team
Gold medal – first place	2016 Bilbao	Boys' doubles
Gold medal – first place	2016 Bilbao	Mixed team
Silver medal – second place	2016 Bilbao	Mixed doubles
Bronze medal – third place	2015 Lima	Boys' doubles
Asian Junior Championships
Gold medal – first place	2015 Bangkok	Mixed team
Gold medal – first place	2016 Bangkok	Boys' doubles
Gold medal – first place	2016 Bangkok	Mixed team
Silver medal – second place	2015 Bangkok	Boys' doubles
Bronze medal – third place	2016 Bangkok	Mixed doubles

Zhou Haodong (Chinese: 周昊东, born 20 February 1998) is a Chinese badminton player. Together with his partner Han Chengkai, he was awarded as the 2018 Most Promising Player of the Year by the BWF. He helped the national team win the 2023 Asia Mixed Team Championships.

== Achievements ==
=== World University Games ===
Men's doubles
Year	Venue	Partner	Opponent	Score	Result	Ref.
2021	Shuangliu Sports Centre Gymnasium; Chengdu, China	(China) He Jiting	(China) Ren Xiangyu (China) Tan Qiang	21–23, 16–21	Silver	

=== BWF World Junior Championships ===
Boys' doubles
Year	Venue	Partner	Opponent	Score	Result
2015	Centro de Alto Rendimiento de la Videna; Lima, Peru	(China) Han Chengkai	(Denmark) Joel Eipe (Denmark) Frederik Søgaard	21–18, 17–21, 20–22	Bronze
2016	Bilbao Arena; Bilbao, Spain	(China) Han Chengkai	(South Korea) Lee Hong-sub (South Korea) Lim Su-min	21–17, 21–14	Gold

Mixed doubles
Year	Venue	Partner	Opponent	Score	Result
2016	Bilbao Arena; Bilbao, Spain	(China) Hu Yuxiang	(China) He Jiting (China) Du Yue	13–21, 15–21	Silver

=== Asian Junior Championships ===
Boys' doubles
Year	Venue	Partner	Opponent	Score	Result
2015	CPB Badminton Training Center; Bangkok, Thailand	(China) Han Chengkai	(China) He Jiting (China) Zheng Siwei	19–21, 21–18, 18–21	Silver
2016	CPB Badminton Training Center; Bangkok, Thailand	(China) Han Chengkai	(China) He Jiting (China) Tan Qiang	21–12, 21–17	Gold

Mixed doubles
Year	Venue	Partner	Opponent	Score	Result
2016	CPB Badminton Training Center; Bangkok, Thailand	(China) Hu Yuxiang	(China) He Jiting (China) Du Yue	14–21, 12–21	Bronze

=== BWF World Tour (4 titles, 4 runners-up) ===
The BWF World Tour, which was announced on 19 March 2017 and implemented in 2018, is a series of elite badminton tournaments sanctioned by the Badminton World Federation (BWF). The BWF World Tour is divided into levels of World Tour Finals, Super 1000, Super 750, Super 500, Super 300, and the BWF Tour Super 100.

Men's doubles
Year	Tournament	Level	Partner	Opponent	Score	Result
2018	Lingshui China Masters	Super 100	(China) Han Chengkai	(China) Di Zijian (China) Wang Chang	19–21, 21–17, 21–16	(gold) Winner
2018	China Open	Super 1000	(China) Han Chengkai	(Denmark) Kim Astrup (Denmark) Anders Skaarup Rasmussen	13–21, 21–17, 14–21	(silver) Runner-up
2018	French Open	Super 750	(China) Han Chengkai	(Indonesia) Marcus Fernaldi Gideon (Indonesia) Kevin Sanjaya Sukamuljo	23–21, 8–21, 21–17	(gold) Winner
2022	Vietnam Open	Super 100	(China) He Jiting	(China) Ren Xiangyu (China) Tan Qiang	21–17, 18–21, 8–21	(silver) Runner-up
2022	Indonesia Masters	Super 100	(China) He Jiting	(Indonesia) Rahmat Hidayat (Indonesia) Pramudya Kusumawardana	18–21, 19–21	(silver) Runner-up
2023	Indonesia Masters	Super 500	(China) He Jiting	(Indonesia) Leo Rolly Carnando (Indonesia) Daniel Marthin	17–21, 16–21	(silver) Runner-up
2023	Spain Masters	Super 300	(China) He Jiting	(Chinese Taipei) Lee Fang-chih (Chinese Taipei) Lee Fang-jen	21–5, 21–12	(gold) Winner
2024	Ruichang China Masters	Super 100	(China) Tan Qiang	(Chinese Taipei) Chiang Chien-wei (Chinese Taipei) Wu Hsuan-yi	21–18, 21–15	(gold) Winner

=== BWF Grand Prix (1 runner-up) ===
The BWF Grand Prix had two levels, the Grand Prix and Grand Prix Gold. It was a series of badminton tournaments sanctioned by the Badminton World Federation (BWF) and played between 2007 and 2017.

Men's doubles
Year	Tournament	Partner	Opponent	Score	Result
2016	Indonesian Masters	(China) Han Chengkai	(Indonesia) Wahyu Nayaka (Indonesia) Kevin Sanjaya Sukamuljo	16–21, 18–21	(silver) Runner-up

BWF Grand Prix Gold tournament
BWF Grand Prix tournament

=== BWF International Challenge/Series (1 runner-up) ===
Mixed doubles
Year	Tournament	Partner	Opponent	Score	Result
2016	China International	(China) Jia Yifan	(China) Wang Sijie (China) Chen Lu	18–21, 21–18, 17–21	(silver) Runner-up

BWF International Challenge tournament
BWF International Series tournament
