= Kuhoo Garg =

Indian badminton player (born 1998)

Personal information
- Born: 22 September 1998 (age 28)

Sport
- Country: India
- Sport: Badminton

Women's singles & doubles
- Highest ranking: 277 (WS 31 March 2016); 73 (WD 8 January 2019); 34 (XD 27 September 2018)
- BWF profile
Medal record
Women's badminton
Representing India
South Asian Games
| Gold medal – first place | 2019 Kathmandu–Pokhara | Women's team |
| Bronze medal – third place | 2019 Kathmandu–Pokhara | Women's doubles |

Kuhoo Garg (born 22 September 1998) is an Indian badminton player. She has secured the All-India Rank (AIR) 178 in the UPSC Civil Services Exam-2023 result and has opted for IPS.

== Achievements ==
=== South Asian Games ===
Women's doubles
| Year | Venue | Partner | Opponent | Score | Result |
|---|---|---|---|---|---|
| 2019 | Badminton Covered Hall; Pokhara, Nepal | (India) Anoushka Parikh | (Sri Lanka) Achini Ratnasiri (Sri Lanka) Upuli Weerasinghe | 10–21, 18–21 | Bronze |

=== BWF World Tour (1 runner-up) ===
The BWF World Tour, which was announced on 19 March 2017 and implemented in 2018, is a series of elite badminton tournaments sanctioned by the Badminton World Federation (BWF). The BWF World Tours are divided into levels of World Tour Finals, Super 1000, Super 750, Super 500, Super 300 (part of the HSBC World Tour), and the BWF Tour Super 100.

Mixed doubles
| Year | Tournament | Level | Partner | Opponent | Score | Result |
|---|---|---|---|---|---|---|
| 2018 | Russian Open | Super 100 | (India) Rohan Kapoor | (Russia) Vladimir Ivanov (South Korea) Kim Min-kyung | 19–21, 17–21 | (silver) Runner-up |

=== BWF International Challenge/Series (4 titles, 4 runners-up) ===
Women's doubles
| Year | Tournament | Partner | Opponent | Score | Result |
|---|---|---|---|---|---|
| 2018 | Lagos International | (India) Riya Mookerjee | (India) Harika Veludurthi (India) Karishma Wadkar | 21–10, 21–19 | (gold) Winner |
| 2019 | Egypt International | (India) Sanyogita Ghorpade | (India) Simran Singhi (India) Ritika Thaker | 16–21, 21–19, 19–21 | (silver) Runner-up |

Mixed doubles
| Year | Tournament | Partner | Opponent | Score | Result |
|---|---|---|---|---|---|
| 2016 | Tata India International | (India) Vighnesh Devlekar | (Indonesia) Fachriza Abimanyu (Indonesia) Bunga Fitriani Romadhini | 5–11, 10–12, 11–4, 11–6, 8–11 | (silver) Runner-up |
| 2017 | Hellas Open | (India) Rohan Kapoor | (India) Utkarsh Arora (India) Karishma Wadkar | 21–19, 21–19 | (gold) Winner |
| 2017 | India International Series | (India) Rohan Kapoor | (Malaysia) Chen Tang Jie (Malaysia) Goh Liu Ying | 19–21, 13–21 | (silver) Runner-up |
| 2018 | Iceland International | (India) Rohan Kapoor | (Denmark) Kristoffer Knudsen (Denmark) Isabella Nielsen | 16–21, 21–19, 21–18 | (gold) Winner |
| 2018 | Lagos International | (India) Rohan Kapoor | (India) Manu Attri (India) K. Maneesha | 17–21, 21–23 | (silver) Runner-up |
| 2019 | Egypt International | (India) Dhruv Rawat | (India) Utkarsh Aurora (India) Karishma Wadkar | 21–16, 22–20 | (gold) Winner |

BWF International Challenge tournament
BWF International Series tournament
BWF Future Series tournament
