= Bilbao Arena =

Arena in Bilbao, Spain

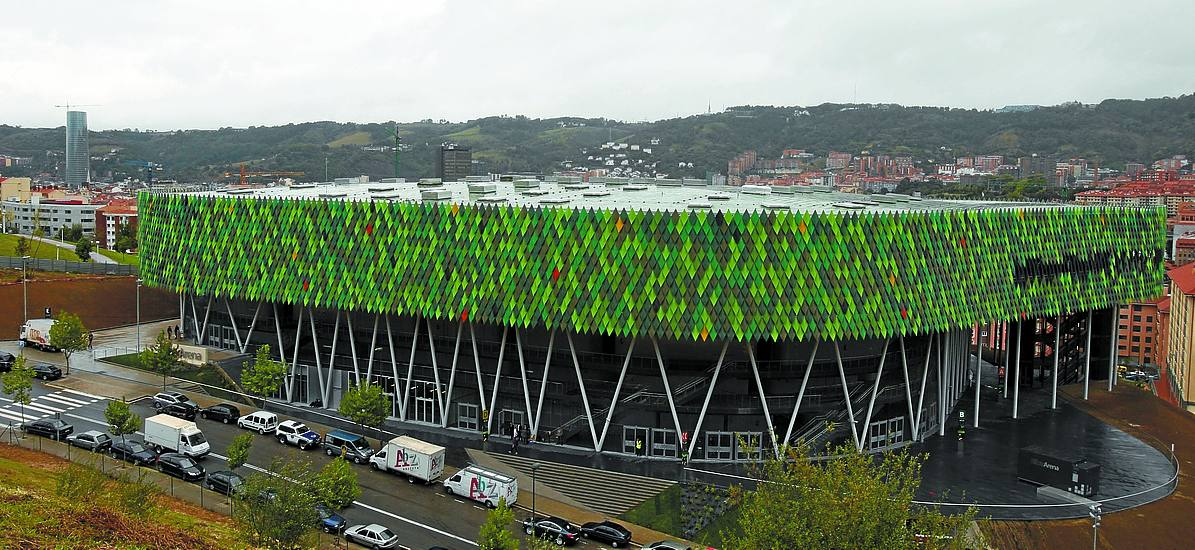
- Interactive map of Bilbao Arena
- Location: Bilbao, Biscay, Spain
- Coordinates: 43°15′08.00″N 2°55′33″W
- Operator: Bilbao City Council
- Capacity: Basketball: 10,014
- Public transit: at Miribilla

Construction
- Opened: September 2010
- Cost: € 38 million
- Architect: ACXT-Idom

Tenant
- Bilbao Basket (2010–present)

Bilbao Arena is an indoor arena in the neighbourhood of Miribilla in Bilbao, Spain. The central hall can hold up to 10,014 people for basketball games. The central hall is also used for concerts and other kinds of shows. The facilities also include swimming pools and gymnasiums for the use of the local residents.

== History ==
Since it opened in September 2010, it is the home arena of the Bilbao Basket club of the Spanish League. The 2011 FIBA Europe Under-20 Championship was contested at the venue.

== Attendances ==
This is a list of league and European competition games attendances of Bilbao Basket at Bilbao Arena.

Domestic competition (Note: Including playoff games)					European competitions				
Season	Total	High	Low	Average	Season	Total	High	Low	Average
2010–11 ACB	165,235	8,793	7,014	7,868	Did not enter any European competition				
2011–12 ACB	156,016	10,014	8,039	8,668	2011–12 EL	88,686	10,014	7,436	8,869
2012–13 ACB	170,562	10,014	6,917	9,476	2012–13 EC	62,429	10,006	6,098	7,804
2013–14 ACB	154,650	10,000	7,610	9,097	2013–14 EC	44,429	8,431	4,583	5,554
2014–15 ACB	168,243	10,014	7,314	8,855	Did not enter any European competition				
2015–16 ACB	154,076	10,004	7,704	9,063	2015–16 EC	38,363	5,780	4,070	4,795
2016–17 ACB	139,322	9,833	7,792	8,708	2016–17 EC	21,658	6,438	4,132	5,415
2017–18 ACB	148,786	9,842	7,803	8,752	2017–18 EC	20,319	4,375	3,711	4,064
2018–19 Oro (Note: Not included Final Four matches, as Bilbao Arena was considered as neutral venue for that event.)	132,771	9,644	5,027	6,639	Did not enter any European competition				
2019–20 ACB (Note: Season suspended due to the COVID-19 pandemic.)	93,502	10,001	7,333	8,500	Did not enter any European competition				
2020–21 ACB	Season played behind closed doors				2020–21 BCL	Season played behind closed doors			
2021–22 ACB (Note: Some games were played with limited attendance.)	100,809	8,487	2,747	5,930	Did not enter any European competition				
2022–23 ACB	133,375	9,972	6,173	7,846	2022–23 BCL	21,745	4,158	2,823	3,624
2023–24 ACB	142,569	9,897	6,138	8,386	2023–24 FEC	43,400	7,600	3,250	5,425

== See also ==
- Bizkaia Arena
- List of indoor arenas in Spain
