= 2017 China Open Super Series Premier =

Tournament details
- Dates: 14 – 19 November 2017
- Level: Super Series Premier
- Total prize money: US$700,000
- Venue: Haixia Olympic Sports Center
- Location: Fuzhou, China

Champions
- Men's singles: (China) Chen Long
- Women's singles: (Japan) Akane Yamaguchi
- Men's doubles: (Indonesia) Marcus Fernaldi Gideon (Indonesia) Kevin Sanjaya Sukamuljo
- Women's doubles: (China) Chen Qingchen (China) Jia Yifan
- Mixed doubles: (China) Zheng Siwei (China) Huang Yaqiong

The 2017 China Open Super Series Premier is the eleventh Super Series tournament of the 2017 BWF Super Series. The tournament will take place at Haixia Olympic Sports Center in Fuzhou, China from November 14 – 19, 2017 and has a total purse of $700,000.

== Men's singles ==
=== Seeds ===
1. (Denmark) Viktor Axelsen (final)
2. (South Korea) Son Wan-ho (semifinals)
3. (China) Lin Dan (first round)
4. (China) Shi Yuqi (quarterfinals)
5. (Chinese Taipei) Chou Tien-chen (quarterfinals)
6. (China) Chen Long (champion)
7. (Malaysia) Lee Chong Wei (quarterfinals)
8. (India) Srikanth Kidambi (withdrew)

=== Top half ===
First round
1	(Denmark) V Axelsen	21	21
PFQ	(China) Zhao JP	17	14
(Hong Kong) Hu Y	17	14
(China) Qiao B	21	21
5	(Chinese Taipei) Chou T-c	21	21	22
(China) Huang YX	23	18	20
(Japan) K Sakai	13	12
PFQ	(Chinese Taipei) Lin Y-h	21	21
3	(China) Lin D	19	16
(Indonesia) J Christie	21	21
(Indonesia) A S Ginting	20	18
(Hong Kong) Ng K L	22	21
7	(Malaysia) Lee C W	21	21
(Chinese Taipei) Hsu J-h	5	7
(India) S Varma	14	21	11
(France) B Leverdez	21	15	21

Second round
1	(Denmark) V Axelsen	21	21
(China) Qiao B	12	14
5	(Chinese Taipei) Chou T-c	21	21
PFQ	(Chinese Taipei) Lin Y-h	16	19
(Indonesia) J Christie	15	18
(Hong Kong) Ng K L	21	21
7	(Malaysia) Lee C W	21	21
(France) B Leverdez	6	9

Quarterfinals
1	(Denmark) V Axelsen	21	21
5	(Chinese Taipei) Chou T-c	17	14
(Hong Kong) Ng K L	21	15	21
7	(Malaysia) Lee C W	12	21	19

Semifinals
1	(Denmark) V Axelsen	21	21
(Hong Kong) Ng K L	12	17

=== Bottom half ===
First round
PFQ	(Japan) K Nishimoto	21	17	12
(Denmark) A Antonsen	17	21	21
(Hong Kong) Wong W K	15	12
6	(China) Chen L	21	21
(Denmark) H-K Vittinghus	21	19	22
(Thailand) T Saensomboonsuk	12	21	24
(England) R Ouseph	21	10	12
4	(China) Shi YQ	12	21	21
Q3	(South Korea) Lee D-k	21	16	19
(India) H. S. Prannoy	18	21	21
Q2	(China) Zhou ZQ	19	15
PFQ	(Hong Kong) Lee C Y	21	21
Q1	(China) Ren PB	21	21
Q4	(China) Guo K	14	14
(China) Tian HW	21	16	18
2	(South Korea) Son W-h	19	21	21

Second round
(Denmark) A Antonsen	17	13
6	(China) Chen L	21	21
(Thailand) T Saensomboonsuk	14	21	18
4	(China) Shi YQ	21	19	21
(India) H. S. Prannoy	19	17
PFQ	(Hong Kong) Lee C Y	21	21
Q1	(China) Ren PB	10	17
2	(South Korea) Son W-h	21	21

Quarterfinals
6	(China) Chen L	21	16	21
4	(China) Shi YQ	13	21	14
PFQ	(Hong Kong) Lee C Y	14	21	18
2	(South Korea) Son W-h	21	12	21

Semifinals
6	(China) Chen L	21	10	21
2	(South Korea) Son W-h	17	21	7

=== Finals ===
Semifinals
1	(Denmark) Viktor Axelsen	21	21
(Hong Kong) Ng Ka Long	12	17
6	(China) Chen Long	21	10	21
2	(South Korea) Son Wan-ho	17	21	7

Final
1	(Denmark) Viktor Axelsen	16	21	13
6	(China) Chen Long	21	14	21

== Women's singles ==
=== Seeds ===
1. (Chinese Taipei) Tai Tzu-ying (quarterfinals)
2. (India) P. V. Sindhu (quarterfinals)
3. (South Korea) Sung Ji-hyun (second round)
4. (Spain) Carolina Marín (semifinals)
5. (Japan) Akane Yamaguchi (champion)
6. (Japan) Nozomi Okuhara (first round)
7. (China) He Bingjiao (quarterfinals)
8. (Thailand) Ratchanok Intanon (semifinals)

=== Top half ===
First round
1	(Chinese Taipei) Tai T-y	11	21	21
(China) Chen YF	21	18	17
(Denmark) L Kjaersfeldt	17	21	21
(Chinese Taipei) Chiang M-h	21	18	9
8	(Thailand) R Intanon	21	21
(Chinese Taipei) Chen S-y	10	14
(Chinese Taipei) Lee C-h	21	21
(Israel) K Polikarpova	11	13
3	(South Korea) Sung J-h	19	21	21
(China) Cai YY	21	19	13
Q2	(China) Li Y	14	21	19
Q3	(China) Ji ST	21	12	21
5	(Japan) A Yamaguchi	21	21
(China) Chen XX	12	14
(India) S Nehwal	21	21
(United States) B Zhang	12	13

Second round
1	(Chinese Taipei) Tai T-y	21	21
(Denmark) L Kjaersfeldt	18	15
8	(Thailand) R Intanon	21	21
(Chinese Taipei) Lee C-h	12	8
3	(South Korea) Sung J-h	21	19	19
Q3	(China) Ji ST	16	21	21
5	(Japan) A Yamaguchi	21	21
(India) S Nehwal	18	11

Quarterfinals
1	(Chinese Taipei) Tai T-y	21	9	20
8	(Thailand) R Intanon	10	21	22
Q3	(China) Ji ST	11	19
5	(Japan) A Yamaguchi	21	21

Semifinals
8	(Thailand) R Intanon	14	18
5	(Japan) A Yamaguchi	21	21

=== Bottom half ===
First round
(China) Zhang YM	22	15	17
(Canada) M Li	20	21	21
(Denmark) M Poulsen	19	6
7	(China) He BJ	21	21
(Russia) E Kosetskaya	18	15
(South Korea) Kim H-m	21	21
(Japan) M Mitani	4	17
4	(Spain) C Marín	21	21
(Chinese Taipei) Sung S-y	8	11
(South Korea) Lee J-m	21	21
Q4	(China) Gao FJ	1
6	(Japan) N Okuhara	0^{r}
Q1	(China) Han Y	21	21
(Canada) B Tam	10	7
(Japan) S Sato	22	21
2	(India) P. V. Sindhu	24	23

Second round
(Canada) M Li	18	21	16
7	(China) He BJ	21	18	21
(South Korea) Kim H-m	21	17	4
4	(Spain) C Marín	18	21	21
(South Korea) Lee J-m	16	15
Q4	(China) Gao FJ	21	21
Q1	(China) Han Y	15	13
2	(India) P. V. Sindhu	21	21

Quarterfinals
7	(China) He BJ	15	24	20
4	(Spain) C Marín	21	22	22
Q4	(China) Gao FJ	21	21
2	(India) P. V. Sindhu	11	10

Semifinals
4	(Spain) C Marín	19	19
Q4	(China) Gao FJ	21	21

=== Finals ===
Semifinals
8	(Thailand) Ratchanok Intanon	14	18
5	(Japan) Akane Yamaguchi	21	21
4	(Spain) Carolina Marín	19	19
Q4	(China) Gao Fangjie	21	21

Final
5	(Japan) Akane Yamaguchi	21	21
Q4	(China) Gao Fangjie	13	15

== Men's doubles ==
=== Seeds ===
1. (Indonesia) Marcus Fernaldi Gideon / Kevin Sanjaya Sukamuljo (champion)
2. (Denmark) Mathias Boe / Carsten Mogensen (final)
3. (Japan) Takeshi Kamura / Keigo Sonoda (first round)
4. (China) Li Junhui / Liu Yuchen (semifinals)
5. (China) Liu Cheng / Zhang Nan (quarterfinals)
6. (Denmark) Mads Conrad-Petersen / Mads Pieler Kolding (quarterfinals)
7. (Indonesia) Ricky Karanda Suwardi / Angga Pratama (first round)
8. (Russia) Vladimir Ivanov / Ivan Sozonov (quarterfinals)

=== Top half ===
First round
1	(Indonesia) M F Gideon (Indonesia) K S Sukamuljo	21	21
(India) M Attri (India) B. S Reddy	18	15
(Thailand) K Kedren (Thailand) D Puavaranukroh	16	15
(Chinese Taipei) Lee J-h (Chinese Taipei) Lee Y	21	21
8	(Russia) V Ivanov (Russia) I Sozonov	23	21	21
(Indonesia) H Setiawan (Malaysia) Tan B H	25	18	19
(Japan) H Endo (Japan) Y Watanabe	15	10
(China) Huang KX (China) Wang YL	21	21
4	(China) Li JH (China) Liu YC	24	18	21
(Malaysia) Goh V S (Malaysia) Teo E Y	22	21	18
Q4	(China) Chai B (China) Wang ZK	21	21
(Germany) M Lamsfuss (Germany) M E Seidel	12	19
5	(China) Liu C (China) Zhang N	21	21
(India) S Rankireddy (India) C Shetty	13	13
(Malaysia) Ong Y S (Malaysia) Tan W K	21	21
(Denmark) M Christiansen (Denmark) D Daugaard	9	10

Second round
1	(Indonesia) M F Gideon (Indonesia) K S Sukamuljo	29	21
(Chinese Taipei) Lee J-h (Chinese Taipei) Lee Y	27	18
8	(Russia) V Ivanov (Russia) I Sozonov	21	17	21
(China) Huang KX (China) Wang YL	16	21	17
4	(China) Li JH (China) Liu YC	21	21
Q4	(China) Chai B (China) Wang ZK	16	17
5	(China) Liu C (China) Zhang N	21	21
(Malaysia) Ong Y S (Malaysia) Tan W K	16	14

Quarterfinals
1	(Indonesia) M F Gideon (Indonesia) K S Sukamuljo	21	21
8	(Russia) V Ivanov (Russia) I Sozonov	19	13
4	(China) Li JH (China) Liu YC	17	21	21
5	(China) Liu C (China) Zhang N	21	12	19

Semifinals
1	(Indonesia) M F Gideon (Indonesia) K S Sukamuljo	21	21
4	(China) Li JH (China) Liu YC	14	18

=== Bottom half ===
First round
(Chinese Taipei) Lu C-y (Chinese Taipei) Yang P-h	21	15	16
(Indonesia) M Ahsan (Indonesia) R A Saputro	18	21	21
(Denmark) K Astrup (Denmark) A S Rasmussen	20	21	21
7	(Indonesia) R K Suwardi (Indonesia) A Pratama	22	19	12
(Japan) T Hoki (Japan) Y Kobayashi	22	21
(Hong Kong) Or C C (Hong Kong) Tang C M	20	13
(China) He JT (China) Zheng SW	21	21
3	(Japan) T Kamura (Japan) K Sonoda	17	16
Q1	(South Korea) Chung E-s (South Korea) Kim D-y	15	10
Q2	(China) Han CK (China) Zhou HD	21	21
(China) Lu K (China) Tan Q	16	17
6	(Denmark) M Conrad-Petersen (Denmark) M P Kolding	21	21
Q3	(Chinese Taipei) Chang K-c (Chinese Taipei) Lu C-p	13	19
(Chinese Taipei) Chen H-l (Chinese Taipei) Wang C-l	21	21
(Hong Kong) Law C H (Hong Kong) Lee C H	15	14
2	(Denmark) M Boe (Denmark) C Mogensen	21	21

Second round
(Indonesia) M Ahsan (Indonesia) R A Saputro	23	19	21
(Denmark) K Astrup (Denmark) A S Rasmussen	21	21	11
(Japan) T Hoki (Japan) Y Kobayashi	21	21
(China) He JT (China) Zheng SW	17	18
Q2	(China) Han CK (China) Zhou HD	16	13
6	(Denmark) M Conrad-Petersen (Denmark) M P Kolding	21	21
(Chinese Taipei) Chen H-l (Chinese Taipei) Wang C-l	22	17	16
2	(Denmark) M Boe (Denmark) C Mogensen	20	21	21

Quarterfinals
(Indonesia) M Ahsan (Indonesia) R A Saputro	21	22
(Japan) T Hoki (Japan) Y Kobayashi	11	20
6	(Denmark) M Conrad-Petersen (Denmark) M P Kolding	23	21	19
2	(Denmark) M Boe (Denmark) C Mogensen	21	23	21

Semifinals
(Indonesia) M Ahsan (Indonesia) R A Saputro	20	12
2	(Denmark) M Boe (Denmark) C Mogensen	22	21

=== Finals ===
Semifinals
1	(Indonesia) Marcus Fernaldi Gideon (Indonesia) Kevin Sanjaya Sukamuljo	21	21
4	(China) Li Junhui (China) Liu Yuchen	14	18
(Indonesia) Mohammad Ahsan (Indonesia) Rian Agung Saputro	20	12
2	(Denmark) Mathias Boe (Denmark) Carsten Mogensen	22	21

Final
1	(Indonesia) Marcus Fernaldi Gideon (Indonesia) Kevin Sanjaya Sukamuljo	21	21
2	(Denmark) Mathias Boe (Denmark) Carsten Mogensen	19	11

== Women's doubles ==
=== Seeds ===
1. (Japan) Misaki Matsutomo / Ayaka Takahashi (quarterfinals)
2. (China) Chen Qingchen / Jia Yifan (champion)
3. (Denmark) Kamilla Rytter Juhl / Christinna Pedersen (first round)
4. (Japan) Yuki Fukushima / Sayaka Hirota (quarterfinals)
5. (South Korea) Chang Ye-na / Jung Kyung-eun (quarterfinals)
6. (Japan) Shiho Tanaka / Koharu Yonemoto (semifinals)
7. (Japan) Naoko Fukuman / Kurumi Yonao (first round)
8. (South Korea) Kim Hye-rin / Lee So-hee (final)

=== Top half ===
First round
(China) Huang YQ (China) Yu XH	21	21
(Germany) L Efler (Germany) O Konon	9	14
6	(Japan) S Tanaka (Japan) K Yonemoto	21	21
(South Korea) Lee Y-r (South Korea) Shin S-c	16	16
(Malaysia) Vivian H K M (Malaysia) Woon K W	15	21	21
(Chinese Taipei) Chiang K-h (Chinese Taipei) Hung S-h	21	19	11
3	(Denmark) K R Juhl (Denmark) C Pedersen
(Australia) S Mapasa (Australia) G Somerville	w	/	o
(Denmark) M Fruergaard (Denmark) S Thygesen	21	20	18
(Germany) I Herttrich (Germany) C Nelte	19	22	21
8	(South Korea) Kim H-r (South Korea) Lee S-h	19	21	23
(Indonesia) G Polii (Indonesia) A Rahayu	21	7	21
(China) Chen Lu (China) Tang JH	21	15	21
(South Korea) Kim S-y (South Korea) Kong H-y	12	21	17

Second round
1	(Japan) M Matsutomo (Japan) A Takahashi	21	21
(China) Huang YQ (China) Yu XH	19	6
6	(Japan) S Tanaka (Japan) K Yonemoto	16	22	21
(Malaysia) Vivian H K M (Malaysia) Woon K W	21	20	12
(Australia) S Mapasa (Australia) G Somerville	21	21
(Germany) I Herttrich (Germany) C Nelte	15	19
8	(South Korea) Kim H-r (South Korea) Lee S-h	21	21
(China) Chen Lu (China) Tang JH	14	14

Quarterfinals
1	(Japan) M Matsutomo (Japan) A Takahashi	15	15
6	(Japan) S Tanaka (Japan) K Yonemoto	21	21
(Australia) S Mapasa (Australia) G Somerville	21	12	16
8	(South Korea) Kim H-r (South Korea) Lee S-h	18	21	21

Semifinals
6	(Japan) S Tanaka (Japan) K Yonemoto	18	21	11
8	(South Korea) Kim H-r (South Korea) Lee S-h	21	13	21

=== Bottom half ===
First round
(Thailand) C Chaladchalam (Thailand) P Muenwong	21	21
(Chinese Taipei) Chang H-t (Chinese Taipei) Yu C-h	15	17
(China) Du Y (China) Li YH	21	21
7	(Japan) N Fukuman (Japan) K Yonao	7	16
(China) Liu XX (China) Xu Y	14	21	19
(Chinese Taipei) Chang C-h (Chinese Taipei) Yang C-t	21	12	21
(China) Huang DP (China) Li WM	15	13
4	(Japan) Y Fukushima (Japan) S Hirota	21	21
(Malaysia) Chow M K (Malaysia) Lee M Y	21	17	21
(Chinese Taipei) Lin X-m (Chinese Taipei) Wu F-c	6	21	9
(Bulgaria) G Stoeva (Bulgaria) S Stoeva	16	15
5	(South Korea) Chang Y-n (South Korea) Jung K-e	21	21
(South Korea) Baek H-n (South Korea) Chae Y-j	21	21
(India) A Ponnappa (India) N. S Reddy	14	15
(Chinese Taipei) Hsu Y-c (Chinese Taipei) Wu T-j	18	3
2	(China) Chen QC (China) Jia YF	21	21

Second round
(Thailand) C Chaladchalam (Thailand) P Muenwong	16	16
(China) Du Y (China) Li YH	21	21
(Chinese Taipei) Chang C-h (Chinese Taipei) Yang C-t	11	9
4	(Japan) Y Fukushima (Japan) S Hirota	21	21
(Malaysia) Chow M K (Malaysia) Lee M Y	21	17	18
5	(South Korea) Chang Y-n (South Korea) Jung K-e	16	21	21
(South Korea) Baek H-n (South Korea) Chae Y-j	13	19
2	(China) Chen QC (China) Jia YF	21	21

Quarterfinals
(China) Du Y (China) Li YH	21	21
4	(Japan) Y Fukushima (Japan) S Hirota	18	12
5	(South Korea) Chang Y-n (South Korea) Jung K-e	20	15
2	(China) Chen QC (China) Jia YF	22	21

Semifinals
(China) Du Y (China) Li YH	21	25	15
2	(China) Chen QC (China) Jia YF	13	27	21

=== Finals ===
Semifinals
6	(Japan) Shiho Tanaka (Japan) Koharu Yonemoto	18	21	11
8	(South Korea) Kim Hye-rin (South Korea) Lee So-hee	21	13	21
(China) Du Yue (China) Li Yinhui	21	25	15
2	(China) Chen Qingchen (China) Jia Yifan	13	27	21

Final
8	(South Korea) Kim Hye-rin (South Korea) Lee So-hee	7	21	14
2	(China) Chen Qingchen (China) Jia Yifan	21	18	21

== Mixed doubles ==
=== Seeds ===
1. (Indonesia) Praveen Jordan / Debby Susanto (first round)
2. (Indonesia) Tontowi Ahmad / Liliyana Natsir (quarterfinals)
3. (England) Chris Adcock / Gabby Adcock (second round)
4. (China) Wang Yilyu / Huang Dongping (semifinals)
5. (China) Zheng Siwei / Huang Yaqiong (champion)
6. (China) Lu Kai / Tang Jinhua (second round)
7. (South Korea) Seo Seung-jae / Kim Ha-na (quarterfinals)
8. (Malaysia) Tan Kian Meng / Lai Pei Jing (first round)

=== Top half ===
First round
1	(Indonesia) P Jordan (Indonesia) D Susanto	18	18
(China) Zhang N (China) Liu XX	21	21
(Malaysia) Chan P S (Malaysia) Cheah Y S	12	21	17
(Thailand) D Puavaranukroh (Thailand) P Supajirakul	21	15	21
8	(Malaysia) Tan K M (Malaysia) Lai P J	15	9
(Hong Kong) Tang C M (Hong Kong) Tse Y S	21	21
(Russia) E Dremin (Russia) E Dimova	22	21
Q2	(China) Han CK (China) Chen Lu	20	9
3	(England) C Adcock (England) G Adcock	19	21	21
(Chinese Taipei) Wang C-l (Chinese Taipei) Lee C-h	21	14	13
(Japan) Y Kobayashi (Japan) M Matsutomo	21	21
(Chinese Taipei) Lee Y (Chinese Taipei) Hsu Y-c	13	19
5	(China) Zheng SW (China) Huang YQ	21	21
PFQ	(Chinese Taipei) Chang K-c (Chinese Taipei) Cheng C-y	13	10
(China) He JT (China) Du Y	21	21
(Hong Kong) Lee C H (Hong Kong) Chau H W	19	18

Second round
(China) Zhang N (China) Liu XX	17	21	21
(Thailand) D Puavaranukroh (Thailand) P Supajirakul	21	18	18
(Hong Kong) Tang C M (Hong Kong) Tse Y S	21	21
(Russia) E Dremin (Russia) E Dimova	13	16
3	(England) C Adcock (England) G Adcock	18	13
(Japan) Y Kobayashi (Japan) M Matsutomo	21	21
5	(China) Zheng SW (China) Huang YQ	21	21
(China) He JT (China) Du Y	18	11

Quarterfinals
(China) Zhang N (China) Liu XX	21	15	20
(Hong Kong) Tang C M (Hong Kong) Tse Y S	14	21	22
(Japan) Y Kobayashi (Japan) M Matsutomo	11	11
5	(China) Zheng SW (China) Huang YQ	21	21

Semifinals
(Hong Kong) Tang C M (Hong Kong) Tse Y S	13	21	15
5	(China) Zheng SW (China) Huang YQ	21	18	21

=== Bottom half ===
First round
(Japan) T Hoki (Japan) S Hirota	22	16	21
(Malaysia) Goh S H (Malaysia) S J Lai	20	21	19
(France) R Labar (France) A Fontaine	18^{r}
7	(South Korea) Seo S-j (South Korea) Kim H-n	18
PFQ	(Germany) M E Seidel (Germany) L Efler	21	13	11
Q4	(China) Wang ZK (China) Xu Y	14	21	21
(Japan) K Kazuno (Japan) A Kurihara	15	19
4	(China) Wang YL (China) Huang DP	21	21
Q3	(India) S Rankireddy (India) A Ponnappa	19	21	13
(Denmark) M Christiansen (Denmark) C Pedersen	21	17	21
(Japan) Y Watanabe (Japan) A Higashino	14	20
6	(China) Lu K (China) Tang JH	21	22
(Germany) M Lamsfuss (Germany) I Herttrich	21	14	21
(South Korea) Kim W-h (South Korea) Shin S-c	18	21	15
Q1	(Denmark) A S Rasmussen (Denmark) L Kjaersfeldt	15	8
2	(Indonesia) T Ahmad (Indonesia) L Natsir	21	21

Second round
(Japan) T Hoki (Japan) S Hirota	21	17	16
7	(South Korea) Seo S-j (South Korea) Kim H-n	16	21	21
Q4	(China) Wang ZK (China) Xu Y	8	11
4	(China) Wang YL (China) Huang DP	21	21
(Denmark) M Christiansen (Denmark) C Pedersen	21	21
6	(China) Lu K (China) Tang JH	10	16
(Germany) M Lamsfuss (Germany) I Herttrich	13	21	11
2	(Indonesia) T Ahmad (Indonesia) L Natsir	21	18	21

Quarterfinals
7	(South Korea) Seo S-j (South Korea) Kim H-n	19	17
4	(China) Wang YL (China) Huang DP	21	21
(Denmark) M Christiansen (Denmark) C Pedersen	15	21	21
2	(Indonesia) T Ahmad (Indonesia) L Natsir	21	8	16

Semifinals
4	(China) Wang YL (China) Huang DP	16	22
(Denmark) M Christiansen (Denmark) C Pedersen	21	24

=== Finals ===
Semifinals
(Hong Kong) Tang Chun Man (Hong Kong) Tse Ying Suet	13	21	15
5	(China) Zheng Siwei (China) Huang Yaqiong	21	18	21
4	(China) Wang Yilyu (China) Huang Dongping	16	22
(Denmark) Mathias Christiansen (Denmark) Christinna Pedersen	21	24

Final
5	(China) Zheng Siwei (China) Huang Yaqiong	21	21
(Denmark) Mathias Christiansen (Denmark) Christinna Pedersen	15	11

Preceded by 2016 China Open Super Series Premier	China Open	Succeeded by 2018 China Open (badminton)
Preceded by 2017 French Super Series	BWF Super Series; 2017 BWF Season	Succeeded by 2017 Hong Kong Super Series
