= 2018 Fuzhou China Open =

2018 badminton tournament in Fujian

Tournament details
- Dates: 6–11 November
- Level: Super 750
- Total prize money: US$700,000
- Venue: Haixia Olympic Sport Center
- Location: Fuzhou, Fujian, China

Champions
- Men's singles: (Japan) Kento Momota
- Women's singles: (China) Chen Yufei
- Men's doubles: (Indonesia) Marcus Fernaldi Gideon (Indonesia) Kevin Sanjaya Sukamuljo
- Women's doubles: (South Korea) Lee So-hee (South Korea) Shin Seung-chan
- Mixed doubles: (China) Zheng Siwei (China) Huang Yaqiong

The 2018 Fuzhou China Open was a badminton tournament which took place at Haixia Olympics Sports Center in Fuzhou, Fujian, China, from 6 to 11 November 2018 and had a total prize of $700,000.

== Tournament ==
The 2018 Fuzhou China Open was the twenty-third tournament of the 2018 BWF World Tour and also part of the Fuzhou China Open (formerly China Masters) championships, which had been held since 2005. This tournament was organized by Chinese Badminton Association and sanctioned by the BWF.

=== Venue ===
This international tournament was held at Haixia Olympic Sports Center in Fuzhou, Fujian, China.

=== Point distribution ===
Below is the point distribution table for each phase of the tournament based on the BWF points system for the BWF World Tour Super 750 event.

Winner	Runner-up	3/4	5/8	9/16	17/32
11,000	9,350	7,700	6,050	4,320	2,660

=== Prize money ===
The total prize money for this tournament was US$700,000. Distribution of prize money was in accordance with BWF regulations.

Event	Winner	Finals	Semi-finals	Quarter-finals	Last 16	Last 32
Singles	$49,000	$23,800	$9,800	$3,850	$2,100	$700
Doubles	$51,800	$24,500	$9,800	$4,375	$2,275	$700

== Men's singles ==
=== Seeds ===
1. (Japan) Kento Momota (champion)
2. (China) Shi Yuqi (semi-finals)
3. (Denmark) Viktor Axelsen (withdrew)
4. (Chinese Taipei) Chou Tien-chen (final)
5. (India) Srikanth Kidambi (quarter-finals)
6. (China) Chen Long (semi-finals)
7. (South Korea) Son Wan-ho (quarter-finals)
8. (Indonesia) Anthony Sinisuka Ginting (quarter-finals)

=== Finals ===
Semi-finals
1	(Japan) Kento Momota	19	21	21
6	(China) Chen Long	21	17	17
4	(Chinese Taipei) Chou Tien-chen	21	21
2	(China) Shi Yuqi	11	10

Final
1	(Japan) Kento Momota	21	11	21
4	(Chinese Taipei) Chou Tien-chen	13	21	16

=== Top half ===
==== Section 1 ====
First Round
1	(Japan) K Momota	21	23
(China) Lin D	15	21
(Denmark) H-K Vittinghus	21	21
(Japan) K Tsuneyama	10	11
7	(South Korea) Son W-h	21	21
PFR	(China) Zhou ZQ	15	13
(China) Huang YX	22	21
(France) B Leverdez	20	11

Second Round
1	(Japan) K Momota	21	21
(Denmark) H-K Vittinghus	13	15
7	(South Korea) Son W-h	20	21	21
(China) Huang YX	22	12	9

Quarter-finals
1	(Japan) K Momota	21	21
7	(South Korea) Son W-h	17	14

==== Section 2 ====
First Round
PFR	(China) Lu GZ	14	16
(Japan) K Nishimoto	21	21
(Denmark) A Antonsen	18	21	22
(South Korea) Lee H-i	21	13	20
6	(China) Chen L	17	21	23
(Thailand) K Wangcharoen	21	12	21
PFR	(Israel) M Zilberman	17	13
(Chinese Taipei) Hsu J-h	21	21

Second Round
(Japan) K Nishimoto	14	22	16
(Denmark) A Antonsen	21	20	21
6	(China) Chen L	21	21
(Chinese Taipei) Hsu J-h	14	11

Quarter-finals
(Denmark) A Antonsen	18	16
6	(China) Chen L	21	21

=== Bottom half ===
==== Section 3 ====
First Round
(Hong Kong) Wong W K	8	10
(Indonesia) T Sugiarto	21	21
PFR	(France) L Corvée	12	16
5	(India) S Kidambi	21	21
(Malaysia) Liew D	18	25	21
(Denmark) J Ø. Jørgensen	21	23	6
(South Korea) Lee D-k	21	16	12
4	(Chinese Taipei) Chou T-c	18	21	21

Second Round
(Indonesia) T Sugiarto	21	9	9
5	(India) S Kidambi	10	21	21
(Malaysia) Liew D	15	19
4	(Chinese Taipei) Chou T-c	21	21

Quarter-finals
5	(India) S Kidambi	14	14
4	(Chinese Taipei) Chou T-c	21	21

==== Section 4 ====
First Round
(Indonesia) J Christie	21	21
(India) Prannoy K	11	14
PFR	(Malaysia) Chong W F	11	14
8	(Indonesia) A S Ginting	21	21
(Thailand) S Avihingsanon	18	21	28
(Japan) K Sakai	21	14	30
PFR	(China) Zhao JP	8	10
2	(China) Shi YQ	21	21

Second Round
(Indonesia) J Christie	20	22	11
8	(Indonesia) A S Ginting	22	20	21
(Japan) K Sakai	10	17
2	(China) Shi YQ	21	21

Quarter-finals
8	(Indonesia) A S Ginting	21	14	14
2	(China) Shi YQ	16	21	21

== Women's singles ==
=== Seeds ===
1. (Chinese Taipei) Tai Tzu-ying (withdrew)
2. (Japan) Akane Yamaguchi (second round)
3. (India) P. V. Sindhu (quarter-finals)
4. (China) Chen Yufei (champion)
5. (Spain) Carolina Marín (semi-finals)
6. (Thailand) Ratchanok Intanon (quarter-finals)
7. (Japan) Nozomi Okuhara (final)
8. (China) He Bingjiao (semi-finals)

=== Finals ===
Semi-finals
7	(Japan) Nozomi Okuhara	21	21
8	(China) He Bingjiao	13	13
4	(China) Chen Yufei	11	21	21
5	(Spain) Carolina Marín	21	15	13

Final
7	(Japan) Nozomi Okuhara	10	16
4	(China) Chen Yufei	21	21

=== Top half ===
==== Section 1 ====
First Round
PFR	(United States) I Zhong	13	9
(Japan) S Takahashi	21	21
(China) Gao FJ	21	21
(Indonesia) Y Y Susanto	14	13
7	(Japan) N Okuhara	21	21
(Canada) R Honderich	19	9
(South Korea) Sung J-h	21	21
(Thailand) N Jindapol	19	10

Second Round
(Japan) S Takahashi	21	19	21
(China) Gao FJ	15	21	18
7	(Japan) N Okuhara	21	21
(South Korea) Sung J-h	10	18

Quarter-finals
(Japan) S Takahashi	4	10
7	(Japan) N Okuhara	21	21

==== Section 2 ====
First Round
3	(India) P. V. Sindhu	21	21
(Russia) E Kosetskaya	13	19
(Chinese Taipei) Lee C-h	7	9
(Thailand) B Ongbamrungphan	21	21
8	(China) He BJ	21	22
(South Korea) Kim H-m	15	20
(Canada) M Li	21	21
(Chinese Taipei) Pai Y-p	17	11

Second Round
3	(India) P. V. Sindhu	21	21
(Thailand) B Ongbamrungphan	12	15
8	(China) He BJ	18	21	21
(Canada) M Li	21	13	18

Quarter-finals
3	(India) P. V. Sindhu	17	21	15
8	(China) He BJ	21	17	21

=== Bottom half ===
==== Section 3 ====
First Round
(China) Han Y	21	21
(Japan) A Ohori	6	17
(Indonesia) L A Mainaky	9	8
6	(Thailand) R Intanon	21	21
(Thailand) P Chochuwong	21	21
PFR	(India) V R Jakka	12	16
(Japan) S Sato	21	10	22
4	(China) Chen YF	13	21	24

Second Round
(China) Han Y	15	14
6	(Thailand) R Intanon	21	21
(Thailand) P Chochuwong	21	9	10
4	(China) Chen YF	19	21	21

Quarter-finals
6	(Thailand) R Intanon	21	9	11
4	(China) Chen YF	15	21	21

==== Section 4 ====
First Round
(Japan) S Kawakami	13	14
(China) Chen XX	21	21
(China) Cai YY	13	21	15
5	(Spain) C Marín	21	15	21
(United States) BW Zhang	21	21
PFR	(Israel) K Polikarpova	14	11
(Denmark) M Blichfeldt	18	21	19
2	(Japan) A Yamaguchi	21	18	21

Second Round
(China) Chen XX	17	11
5	(Spain) C Marín	21	21
(United States) BW Zhang	21	21
2	(Japan) A Yamaguchi	18	18

Quarter-finals
5	(Spain) C Marín	21	21
(United States) BW Zhang	11	13

== Men's doubles ==
=== Seeds ===
1. (Indonesia) Marcus Fernaldi Gideon / Kevin Sanjaya Sukamuljo (champions)
2. (China) Li Junhui / Liu Yuchen (quarter-finals)
3. (China) Liu Cheng / Zhang Nan (semi-finals)
4. (Japan) Takeshi Kamura / Keigo Sonoda (second round)
5. (Chinese Taipei) Chen Hung-ling / Wang Chi-lin (first round)
6. (Denmark) Kim Astrup / Anders Skaarup Rasmussen (quarter-finals)
7. (Denmark) Mads Conrad-Petersen / Mads Pieler Kolding (first round)
8. (Indonesia) Fajar Alfian / Muhammad Rian Ardianto (first round)

=== Finals ===
Semi-finals
1	(Indonesia) Marcus Fernaldi Gideon (Indonesia) Kevin Sanjaya Sukamuljo	17	21	21
3	(China) Liu Cheng (China) Zhang Nan	21	18	14
(Indonesia) Mohammad Ahsan (Indonesia) Hendra Setiawan	14	15
(China) He Jiting (China) Tan Qiang	21	21

Final
1	(Indonesia) Marcus Fernaldi Gideon (Indonesia) Kevin Sanjaya Sukamuljo	25	21	21
(China) He Jiting (China) Tan Qiang	27	17	15

=== Top half ===
==== Section 1 ====
First Round
1	(Indonesia) M F Gideon (Indonesia) K S Sukamuljo	21	21
(Chinese Taipei) Lee J-h (Chinese Taipei) Lee Y	13	16
(Denmark) M Boe (Denmark) C Mogensen	10	21	16
(South Korea) Kang M-h (South Korea) Kim W-h	21	14	21
6	(Denmark) K Astrup (Denmark) A S Rasmussen	21	27
(India) M Attri (India) B. S Reddy	16	25
(Japan) T Hoki (Japan) Y Kobayashi	18	13
(China) Han CK (China) Zhou HD	21	21

Second Round
1	(Indonesia) M F Gideon (Indonesia) K S Sukamuljo	21	21
(South Korea) Kang M-h (South Korea) Kim W-h	18	11
6	(Denmark) K Astrup (Denmark) A S Rasmussen	21	21
(China) Han CK (China) Zhou HD	19	17

Quarter-finals
1	(Indonesia) M F Gideon (Indonesia) K S Sukamuljo	22	21
6	(Denmark) K Astrup (Denmark) A S Rasmussen	20	17

==== Section 2 ====
First Round
3	(China) Liu C (China) Zhang N	21	16	21
(Chinese Taipei) Lu C-y (Chinese Taipei) Yang P-ha	13	21	9
(Indonesia) B Angriawan (Indonesia) Hardianto	20	18
(Malaysia) Goh V S (Malaysia) Tan W K	22	21
8	(Indonesia) F Alfian (Indonesia) M R Ardianto	18	19
(Chinese Taipei) Liao M-c (Chinese Taipei) Su C-h	21	21
(United States) P Chew (United States) R Chew	6	5
(Japan) H Endo (Japan) Y Watanabe	21	21

Second Round
3	(China) Liu C (China) Zhang N	21	20	21
(Malaysia) Goh V S (Malaysia) Tan W K	19	22	15
(Chinese Taipei) Liao M-c (Chinese Taipei) Su C-h	21	21
(Japan) H Endo (Japan) Y Watanabe	19	17

Quarter-finals
3	(China) Liu C (China) Zhang N	21	21
(Chinese Taipei) Liao M-c (Chinese Taipei) Su C-h	14	11

=== Bottom half ===
==== Section 3 ====
First Round
(Indonesia) W Nayaka (Indonesia) A Y Santoso	21	21	21
(Thailand) K Kedren (Thailand) D Puavaranukroh	15	23	17
(India) S Rankireddy (India) C Shetty	23	24
7	(Denmark) M Conrad-Petersen (Denmark) M P Kolding	21	22
(China) Huang KX (China) Wang ZK	21	15	19
(Indonesia) M Ahsan (Indonesia) H Setiawan	17	21	21
(Thailand) B Isara (Thailand) M Jongjit	18	9
4	(Japan) T Kamura (Japan) K Sonoda	21	21

Second Round
(Indonesia) W Nayaka (Indonesia) A Y Santoso	21	14	15
(India) S Rankireddy (India) C Shetty	16	21	21
(Indonesia) M Ahsan (Indonesia) H Setiawan	13	21	21
4	(Japan) T Kamura (Japan) K Sonoda	21	17	9

Quarter-finals
(India) S Rankireddy (India) C Shetty	11	21	12
(Indonesia) M Ahsan (Indonesia) H Setiawan	21	16	21

==== Section 4 ====
First Round
(South Korea) Chung E-s (South Korea) Kim D-y	23	21
PFR	(Chinese Taipei) Kan C-y (Chinese Taipei) Liao C-h	21	15
(China) He JT (China) Tan Q	21	21
5	(Chinese Taipei) Chen H-l (Chinese Taipei) Wang C-l	14	16
(China) Ou XY (China) Ren XY	21	21
(Japan) T Inoue (Japan) Y Kaneko	13	17
PFR	(China) Wang YL (China) Zheng SW	21	18	15
2	(China) Li JH (China) Liu YC	18	21	21

Second Round
(South Korea) Chung E-s (South Korea) Kim D-y	13	18
(China) He JT (China) Tan Q	21	21
(China) Ou XY (China) Ren XY	16	14
2	(China) Li JH (China) Liu YC	21	21

Quarter-finals
(China) He JT (China) Tan Q	21	14	21
2	(China) Li JH (China) Liu YC	15	21	19

== Women's doubles ==
=== Seeds ===
1. (Japan) Yuki Fukushima / Sayaka Hirota (second round)
2. (Japan) Misaki Matsutomo / Ayaka Takahashi (semi-finals)
3. (China) Chen Qingchen / Jia Yifan (second round)
4. (Indonesia) Greysia Polii / Apriyani Rahayu (quarter-finals)
5. (Japan) Mayu Matsumoto / Wakana Nagahara (final)
6. (Japan) Shiho Tanaka / Koharu Yonemoto (second round)
7. (South Korea) Lee So-hee / Shin Seung-chan (champions)
8. (Thailand) Jongkolphan Kititharakul / Rawinda Prajongjai (second round)

=== Finals ===
Semi-finals
5	(Japan) Mayu Matsumoto (Japan) Wakana Nagahara	24	21
(South Korea) Chae Yoo-jung (South Korea) Kim So-yeong	22	16
7	(South Korea) Lee So-hee (South Korea) Shin Seung-chan	21	21
2	(Japan) Misaki Matsutomo (Japan) Ayaka Takahashi	16	12

Final
5	(Japan) Mayu Matsumoto (Japan) Wakana Nagahara	21	18
7	(South Korea) Lee So-hee (South Korea) Shin Seung-chan	23	21

=== Top half ===
==== Section 1 ====
First Round
(South Korea) Chang Y-n (South Korea) Jung K-e	21	21
(France) É Lefel (France) A Tran	9	18
5	(Japan) M Matsumoto (Japan) W Nagahara	21	21
(China) Du Y (China) Li YH	18	19
(China) Tang JH (China) Yu XH
(Thailand) P Supajirakul (Thailand) S Taerattanachai	w	/	o

Second Round
1	(Japan) Y Fukushima (Japan) S Hirota	13	11
(South Korea) Chang Y-n (South Korea) Jung K-e	21	21
5	(Japan) M Matsumoto (Japan) W Nagahara	21	21
(Thailand) P Supajirakul (Thailand) S Taerattanachai	19	15

Quarter-finals
(South Korea) Chang Y-n (South Korea) Jung K-e	15	19
5	(Japan) M Matsumoto (Japan) W Nagahara	21	21

==== Section 2 ====
First Round
(South Korea) Chae Y-j (South Korea) Kim S-y	21	21
(China) Huang DP (China) Huang YQ	16	12
6	(Japan) S Tanaka (Japan) K Yonemoto	21	15	21
(India) A Ponnappa (India) N. S Reddy	19	21	17
(South Korea) Baek H-n (South Korea) Kim H-r	21	12	21
(Chinese Taipei) Lin W-c (Chinese Taipei) Wu T-j	14	21	12

Second Round
3	(China) Chen QC (China) Jia YF	9	18
(South Korea) Chae Y-j (South Korea) Kim S-y	21	21
6	(Japan) S Tanaka (Japan) K Yonemoto	15	13
(South Korea) Baek H-n (South Korea) Kim H-r	21	21

Quarter-finals
(South Korea) Chae Y-j (South Korea) Kim S-y	21	21
(South Korea) Baek H-n (South Korea) Kim H-r	17	16

=== Bottom half ===
==== Section 3 ====
First Round
(United States) A Lee (United States) S Lee	7	4
(Japan) N Fukuman (Japan) K Yonao	21	21
(Canada) R Honderich (Canada) K Tsai	21	20	15
7	(South Korea) Lee S-h (South Korea) Shin S-c	19	22	21
(South Korea) Kim H-j (South Korea) Kong H-y	21	21
(China) Chen L (China) Xu Y	14	17

Second Round
(Japan) N Fukuman (Japan) K Yonao	16	12
7	(South Korea) Lee S-h (South Korea) Shin S-c	21	21
(South Korea) Kim H-j (South Korea) Kong H-y	16	19
4	(Indonesia) G Polii (Indonesia) A Rahayu	21	21

Quarter-finals
7	(South Korea) Lee S-h (South Korea) Shin S-c	21	17	21
4	(Indonesia) G Polii (Indonesia) A Rahayu	17	21	18

==== Section 4 ====
First Round
(Denmark) M Fruergaard (Denmark) S Thygesen	21	14	19
(China) Li WM (China) Zheng Y	17	21	21
(Chinese Taipei) Hsu Y-c (Chinese Taipei) Hu L-f	21	23	11
8	(Thailand) J Kititharakul (Thailand) R Prajongjai	11	25	21
(China) Dong WJ (China) Feng XY	21	21
(United States) E Kan (United States) I Zhong	13	12

Second Round
(China) Li WM (China) Zheng Y	21	22
8	(Thailand) J Kititharakul (Thailand) R Prajongjai	16	20
(China) Dong WJ (China) Feng XY	22	15
2	(Japan) M Matsutomo (Japan) A Takahashi	24	21

Quarter-finals
(China) Li WM (China) Zheng Y	13	15
2	(Japan) M Matsutomo (Japan) A Takahashi	21	21

== Mixed doubles ==
=== Seeds ===
1. (China) Zheng Siwei / Huang Yaqiong (champions)
2. (China) Wang Yilyu / Huang Dongping (final)
3. (Indonesia) Tontowi Ahmad / Liliyana Natsir (quarter-finals)
4. (Hong Kong) Tang Chun Man / Tse Ying Suet (first round)
5. (Denmark) Mathias Christiansen / Christinna Pedersen (first round)
6. (China) Zhang Nan / Li Yinhui (second round)
7. (Malaysia) Chan Peng Soon / Goh Liu Ying (second round)
8. (Japan) Yuta Watanabe / Arisa Higashino (semi-finals)

=== Finals ===
Semi-finals
1	(China) Zheng Siwei (China) Huang Yaqiong	21	21
(China) He Jiting (China) Du Yue	12	12
8	(Japan) Yuta Watanabe (Japan) Arisa Higashino	14	6
2	(China) Wang Yilyu (China) Huang Dongping	21	21

Final
1	(China) Zheng Siwei (China) Huang Yaqiong	21	11	21
2	(China) Wang Yilyu (China) Huang Dongping	15	21	19

=== Top half ===
==== Section 1 ====
First Round
1	(China) Zheng SW (China) Huang YQ	21	18	21
(Denmark) N Nøhr (Denmark) S Thygesen	15	21	14
(Indonesia) A B Cahyono (Indonesia) W O Kandow	20	19
(China) Ren XY (China) Zhou CM	22	21
6	(China) Zhang N (China) Li YH	23	16	21
PFR	(Japan) Y Kaneko (Japan) M Matsutomo	21	21	13
(Thailand) D Puavaranukroh (Thailand) S Taerattanachai	21	21
(Indonesia) H Faizal (Indonesia) G E Widjaja	15	9

Second Round
1	(China) Zheng SW (China) Huang YQ	21	21
(China) Ren XY (China) Zhou CM	18	9
6	(China) Zhang N (China) Li YH	21	16	15
(Thailand) D Puavaranukroh (Thailand) S Taerattanachai	19	21	21

Quarter-finals
1	(China) Zheng SW (China) Huang YQ	21	19	21
(Thailand) D Puavaranukroh (Thailand) S Taerattanachai	10	21	11

==== Section 2 ====
First Round
3	(Indonesia) T Ahmad (Indonesia) L Natsir	21	21
(Malaysia) Goh S H (Malaysia) S J Lai	17	19
(United States) M Fogarty (United States) I Zhong	4	10
(South Korea) Kim H-t (South Korea) Kim H-j	21	21
5	(Denmark) M Christiansen (Denmark) C Pedersen	17	12
(China) He JT (China) Du Y	21	21
(Chinese Taipei) Wang C-l (Chinese Taipei) Lee C-h	20	16
(Japan) Y Kobayashi (Japan) K Yonemoto	22	21

Second Round
3	(Indonesia) T Ahmad (Indonesia) L Natsir	21	21
(South Korea) Kim H-t (South Korea) Kim H-j	4	15
(China) He JT (China) Du Y	21	21
(Japan) Y Kobayashi (Japan) K Yonemoto	10	7

Quarter-finals
3	(Indonesia) T Ahmad (Indonesia) L Natsir	18	19
(China) He JT (China) Du Y	21	21

=== Bottom half ===
==== Section 3 ====
First Round
PFR	(Japan) T Hoki (Japan) W Nagahara	23	22
(Denmark) J Fischer Nielsen (Denmark) A Bøje	21	20
(Chinese Taipei) Lee Y (Chinese Taipei) Hsu Y-c	19	13
8	(Japan) Y Watanabe (Japan) A Higashino	21	21
(China) Lu K (China) Chen L	21	17	16
(South Korea) Kim W-h (South Korea) Baek H-n	13	21	21
(China) Ou XY (China) Feng XY	21	21
4	(Hong Kong) Tang C M (Hong Kong) Tse Y S	17	18

Second Round
PFR	(Japan) T Hoki (Japan) W Nagahara	14	17
8	(Japan) Y Watanabe (Japan) A Higashino	21	21
(South Korea) Kim W-h (South Korea) Baek H-n	21	21
(China) Ou XY (China) Feng XY	18	9

Quarter-finals
8	(Japan) Y Watanabe (Japan) A Higashino	21	26
(South Korea) Kim W-h (South Korea) Baek H-n	19	24

==== Section 4 ====
First Round
(England) C Adcock (England) G Adcock	6	16
(Indonesia) P Jordan (Indonesia) M D Oktavianti	21	21
(India) S Rankireddy (India) A Ponnappa	21	19	17
7	(Malaysia) Chan P S (Malaysia) Goh L Y	18	21	21
(France) R Labar (France) A Mittelheisser	9	17
(Indonesia) R Rivaldy (Indonesia) D Susanto	21	21
(Malaysia) Tan K M (Malaysia) Lai P J	15	5
2	(China) Wang YL (China) Huang DP	21	21

Second Round
(Indonesia) P Jordan (Indonesia) M D Oktavianti	21	21
7	(Malaysia) Chan P S (Malaysia) Goh L Y	17	15
(Indonesia) R Rivaldy (Indonesia) D Susanto	10	16
2	(China) Wang YL (China) Huang DP	21	21

Quarter-finals
(Indonesia) P Jordan (Indonesia) M D Oktavianti	21	16	14
2	(China) Wang YL (China) Huang DP	18	21	21

Preceded by 2018 SaarLorLux Open	BWF World Tour; 2018 BWF season	Succeeded by 2018 Hong Kong Open
