= 2015 Badminton Asia Junior Championships – Boys' doubles =

Tournament details
- Dates: 1 – 5 July 2015
- Edition: 18
- Venue: CPB Badminton and Sports Science Training Center
- Location: Bangkok, Thailand

The boys' doubles tournament of the 2015 Badminton Asia Junior Championships was held from July 1 to 5. The defending champions of the last edition were the Chinese pair Huang Kaixiang and Zheng Siwei. This time Zheng Siwei teamed-up with He Jiting (the 2nd seeded) claim the title after upset their teammates Han Chengkai and Zhou Haodong in the finals in the rubber games with the score 21–19, 18–21, 21–19.

== Seeded ==
1. (South Korea) Choi Jong-woo / Seo Seung-jae (second round)
2. (China) He Jiting / Zheng Siwei (champion)
3. (Indonesia) Andika Ramadiansyah / Rinov Rivaldy (second round)
4. (South Korea) Lee Hong-sub / Lim Su-min (semi final)
5. (Indonesia) Yahya Adi Kumara / Yantoni Edy Saputra (third round)
6. (India) Arjun Madathil Ramachandran / Chirag Shetty (quarter final)
7. (Indonesia) Muhammad Fachrikar / Muhammad Reza Pahlevi Isfahani (second round)
8. (Chinese Taipei) Po Li-wei / Yang Ming-tse (third round)

== Draw ==
=== Finals ===
Quarterfinals
(China) Ren Xiangyu (China) Tan Qiang | 21 | 21
(Thailand) Mek Narongrit (Thailand) Krit Tantianankul | 12 | 17
(China) Han Chengkai (China) Zhou Haodong | 21 | 21
(Malaysia) Ooi Zi Heng (Malaysia) Soh Wooi Yik | 14 | 19
6 | (India) Arjun Madathil Ramachandran (India) Chirag Shetty | 21 | 14 | 17
4 | (South Korea) Lee Hong-sub (South Korea) Lim Su-min | 14 | 21 | 21
(South Korea) Lee Jun-su (South Korea) Park Kyung-hoon | 18 | 15
2 | (China) He Jiting (China) Zheng Siwei | 21 | 21

Semifinals
(China) Ren Xiangyu (China) Tan Qiang | 21 | 16 | 18
(China) Han Chengkai (China) Zhou Haodong | 12 | 21 | 21
4 | (South Korea) Lee Hong-sub (South Korea) Lim Su-min | 15 | 8
2 | (China) He Jiting (China) Zheng Siwei | 21 | 21

Final
(China) Han Chengkai (China) Zhou Haodong | 19 | 21 | 18
2 | (China) He Jiting (China) Zheng Siwei | 21 | 18 | 21

=== Top half ===
==== Section 1 ====
First round
(China) Ren XY (China) Tan Q | 21 | 21
(Thailand) S Maunglai (Thailand) N Tulamok | 14 | 12
(India) K Chaudhary (India) C Tripathi | 21 | 19
(Singapore) A Kwek (Singapore) A Tan | 23 | 21

Second round
1 | (South Korea) Choi J-w (South Korea) Seo S-j | 13 | 20
(China) Ren XY (China) Tan Q | 21 | 22
(Philippines) C Bernardo (Philippines) A Morada | 21 | 21 | 21
(Singapore) A Kwek (Singapore) A Tan | 23 | 14 | 17

Third round
(China) Ren XY (China) Tan Q | 21 | 15 | 21
(Philippines) C Bernardo (Philippines) A Morada | 17 | 21 | 15

==== Section 2 ====
First round
(Japan) K Mitsuhashi (Japan) Y Watanabe | 17 | 19
(Malaysia) A Chia (Malaysia) Sim G Z | 21 | 21
(Sri Lanka) T Ambegoda (Sri Lanka) T Punchihewa | 14 | 8
(Thailand) M Narongrit (Thailand) K Tantianankul | 21 | 21

Second round
(Indonesia) M Fachrikar (Indonesia) M R P Isfahani | 21 | 15 | 16
(Malaysia) A Chia (Malaysia) Sim G Z | 13 | 21 | 21
(Macau) Iek U I (Macau) Lou H M | 9 | 12
(Thailand) M Narongrit (Thailand) K Tantianankul | 21 | 21

Third round
(Malaysia) A Chia (Malaysia) Sim G Z | 12 | 17
(Thailand) M Narongrit (Thailand) K Tantianankul | 21 | 21

==== Section 3 ====
First round
(China) Han CK (China) Zhou HD | 21 | 21
(Vietnam) Le V T (Vietnam) Nguyen V D | 12 | 8
(Hong Kong) Lee C L (Hong Kong) Leung K Y | 18 | 21 | 8
(Thailand) R Lounsiri (Thailand) K Pikunngam | 21 | 17 | 21

Second round
3 | (Indonesia) A Ramadiansyah (Indonesia) R Rivaldy | 22 | 21 | 21
(China) Han CK (China) Zhou HD | 24 | 16 | 23
(Pakistan) Z Khalil (Pakistan) M Tahir | 11 | 7
(Thailand) R Lounsiri (Thailand) K Pikunngam | 21 | 21

Third round
(China) Han CK (China) Zhou HD | 21 | 21
(Thailand) R Lounsiri (Thailand) K Pikunngam | 12 | 16

==== Section 4 ====
First round
(Sri Lanka) D Gunatilleke (Sri Lanka) M A Samaranayake | 21 | 12 | 13
(India) R Kapoor (India) S Sharma | 15 | 21 | 21
(Turkmenistan) K Atliyev (Turkmenistan) N Apov | 5 | 7
(Bangladesh) K I Opu (Bangladesh) T K Roy | 21 | 21
(Singapore) Lee J L (Singapore) J Wong | 17 | 18
(Malaysia) Ooi Z H (Malaysia) Soh W Y | 21 | 21

Second round
8 | (Chinese Taipei) Po L-w (Chinese Taipei) Yang M-t | 21 | 21
(India) R Kapoor (India) S Sharma | 19 | 18
(Bangladesh) K I Opu (Bangladesh) T K Roy | 8 | 8
(Malaysia) Ooi Z H (Malaysia) Soh W Y | 21 | 21

Third round
8 | (Chinese Taipei) Po L-w (Chinese Taipei) Yang M-t | 14 | 19
(Malaysia) Ooi Z H (Malaysia) Soh W Y | 21 | 21

=== Bottom half ===
==== Section 5 ====
First round
(Singapore) Loh K Y (Singapore) R Ng | 21 | 21
(Philippines) J R Deato (Philippines) V R Manuel | 18 | 18
(Vietnam) Nguyen D G (Vietnam) Dang Q H | 11 | 12
(Thailand) P Kuna-Anuvit (Thailand) N Trinkajee | 21 | 21
(Malaysia) Goh S F (Malaysia) Tan J H | 21 | 21
(Sri Lanka) R R De Silva (Sri Lanka) S H De Silva | 6 | 8

Second round
(Singapore) Loh K Y (Singapore) R Ng | 21 | 21
(Thailand) P Kuna-Anuvit (Thailand) N Trinkajee | 10 | 19
(Malaysia) Goh S F (Malaysia) Tan J H | 17 | 21 | 19
6 | (India) A M Ramachandran (India) C Shetty | 21 | 12 | 21

Third round
(Singapore) Loh K Y (Singapore) R Ng | 13 | 12
6 | (India) A M Ramachandran (India) C Shetty | 21 | 21

==== Section 6 ====
First round
(Macau) Lam H H (Macau) Wong T H | 16 | 16
(Nepal) N Devkota (Nepal) D Dhami | 21 | 21
(Japan) S Morioka (Japan) K Ogawa | 21 | 21
(Hong Kong) Chan Y C (Hong Kong) Lam W L | 18 | 17

Second round
(Nepal) N Devkota (Nepal) D Dhami | 4 | 5
(Chinese Taipei) Hung T-w (Chinese Taipei) Lin Y-f | 21 | 21
(Japan) S Morioka (Japan) K Ogawa | 10 | 10
4 | (South Korea) Lee H-s (South Korea) Lim S-m | 21 | 21

Third round
(Chinese Taipei) Hung T-w (Chinese Taipei) Lin Y-f | 22 | 14 | 18
4 | (South Korea) Lee H-s (South Korea) Lim S-m | 20 | 21 | 21

==== Section 7 ====
First round
(Mongolia) G Dashnyam (Mongolia) D Davaadorj | 3 | 5
(South Korea) Lee J-s (South Korea) Park K-h | 21 | 21
(Hong Kong) Y Chung (Hong Kong) Li K H | 21 | 21
(Macau) Che P N (Macau) Pui P F | 9 | 12

Second round
(South Korea) Lee J-s (South Korea) Park K-h | 21 | 21
(Iran) M Ansari (Iran) A Jabbari | 13 | 8
(Hong Kong) Y Chung (Hong Kong) Li K H | 14 | 21 | 14
5 | (Indonesia) Y A Kumara (Indonesia) Y E Saputra | 21 | 14 | 21

Third round
(South Korea) Lee J-s (South Korea) Park K-h | 21 | 21
5 | (Indonesia) Y A Kumara (Indonesia) Y E Saputra | 13 | 12

==== Section 8 ====
First round
(Japan) K Sakai (Japan) K Watanabe | 21 | 21
(Bangladesh) M Hossain (Bangladesh) M Mohammad | 15 | 13
(Thailand) P Chandawan (Thailand) C Charoenkitamorn | 21 | 21
(Kazakhstan) O Yermakov (Kazakhstan) I Yuldashev | 4 | 7

Second round
(Japan) K Sakai (Japan) K Watanabe | 23 | 12 | 16
(Chinese Taipei) Chien H-j (Chinese Taipei) Lin Y-s | 21 | 21 | 21
(Thailand) P Chandawan (Thailand) C Charoenkitamorn | 7 | 8
2 | (China) He JT (China) Zheng SW | 21 | 21

Third round
(Chinese Taipei) Chien H-j (Chinese Taipei) Lin Y-s | 12 | 11
2 | (China) He JT (China) Zheng SW | 21 | 21
