= 2017 French Super Series =

Badminton championships

Tournament details
- Dates: 24 – 29 October 2017
- Level: Super Series
- Total prize money: US$325,000
- Venue: Stade Pierre de Coubertin
- Location: Paris, France

Champions
- Men's singles: (India) Srikanth Kidambi
- Women's singles: (Chinese Taipei) Tai Tzu-ying
- Men's doubles: (Chinese Taipei) Lee Jhe-huei (Chinese Taipei) Lee Yang
- Women's doubles: (Indonesia) Greysia Polii (Indonesia) Apriyani Rahayu
- Mixed doubles: (Indonesia) Tontowi Ahmad (Indonesia) Liliyana Natsir

The 2017 French Super Series was the tenth Super Series tournament of the 2017 BWF Super Series. The tournament took place at Stade Pierre de Coubertin in Paris, France from October 24 – 29, 2017 and had a total purse of $325,000.

== Men's singles ==
=== Seeds ===
1. (Denmark) Viktor Axelsen (withdrew)
2. (South Korea) Son Wan-ho (first round)
3. (China) Lin Dan (withdrew)
4. (China) Shi Yuqi (quarterfinals)
5. (Chinese Taipei) Chou Tien-chen (first round)
6. (China) Chen Long (second round)
7. (Malaysia) Lee Chong Wei (first round)
8. (India) Srikanth Kidambi (champion)

=== Top half ===
First round
PFQ	(Thailand) S Avihingsanon	8	21	21
(Thailand) T Saensomboonsuk	21	14	14
PFQ	(Brazil) Y Coelho	21	10	21
(Hong Kong) Ng K L	19	21	23
6	(China) Chen L	21	21
PFQ	(Netherlands) M Caljouw	12	17
(Denmark) A Antonsen	21	21
(China) Huang YX	12	18
PFQ	(India) K Parupalli	23	18	17
(Indonesia) A S Ginting	21	21	21
Q4	(France) L Corvee	17	22	19
(Hong Kong) Hu Y	21	20	21
7	(Malaysia) Lee C W	14	15
Q3	(Japan) K Nishimoto	21	21
(India) B. S Praneeth	21	21	21
(Thailand) K Phetpradab	13	23	19

Second round
PFQ	(Thailand) S Avihingsanon	17	24	12
(Hong Kong) Ng K L	21	22	21
6	(China) Chen L	21	16	16
(Denmark) A Antonsen	15	21	21
(Indonesia) A S Ginting	21	21
(Hong Kong) Hu Y	7	16
Q3	(Japan) K Nishimoto	21	21
(India) B. S Praneeth	13	17

Quarterfinals
(Hong Kong) Ng K L	16	16
(Denmark) A Antonsen	21	21
(Indonesia) A S Ginting	21	10	14
Q3	(Japan) K Nishimoto	14	21	21

Semifinals
(Denmark) A Antonsen	17	15
Q3	(Japan) K Nishimoto	21	21

=== Bottom half ===
First round
(Hong Kong) Wong W K	14	21	21
(Indonesia) J Christie	21	13	16
PFQ	(Germany) F Roth	0^{r}
8	(India) S Kidambi	3
(France) B Leverdez	21	21
Q2	(Denmark) R Gemke	15	9
PFQ	(Japan) K Sakai	19	19
4	(China) Shi YQ	21	21
(China) Qiao B	21	15	21
Q1	(France) T Rouxel	18	21	12
(South Korea) Jeon H-j	21	21
5	(Chinese Taipei) Chou T-c	8	12
(India) H. S. Prannoy	21	21
(South Korea) Lee H-i	15	17
(Denmark) H-K Vittinghus	21	21
2	(South Korea) Son W-h	16	19

Second round
(Hong Kong) Wong W K	19	17
8	(India) S Kidambi	21	21
(France) B Leverdez	15	10
4	(China) Shi YQ	21	21
(China) Qiao B	16	21	12
(South Korea) Jeon H-j	21	13	21
(India) H. S. Prannoy	21	21
(Denmark) H-K Vittinghus	11	12

Quarterfinals
8	(India) S Kidambi	8	21	21
4	(China) Shi YQ	21	19	9
(South Korea) Jeon H-j	16	16
(India) H. S. Prannoy	21	21

Semifinals
8	(India) S Kidambi	14	21	21
(India) H. S. Prannoy	21	19	18

=== Finals ===
Semifinals
(Denmark) Anders Antonsen	17	15
Q3	(Japan) Kenta Nishimoto	21	21
8	(India) Srikanth Kidambi	14	21	21
(India) H. S. Prannoy	21	19	18

Final
Q3	(Japan) Kenta Nishimoto	14	13
8	(India) Srikanth Kidambi	21	21

== Women's singles ==
=== Seeds ===
1. (Chinese Taipei) Tai Tzu-ying (champion)
2. (India) P. V. Sindhu (semifinals)
3. (South Korea) Sung Ji-hyun (quarterfinals)
4. (Spain) Carolina Marín (second round)
5. (Japan) Akane Yamaguchi (final)
6. (China) Sun Yu (withdrew)
7. (China) He Bingjiao (semifinals)
8. (Thailand) Ratchanok Intanon (quarterfinals)

=== Top half ===
First round
1	(Chinese Taipei) Tai T-y	21	19	21
(China) Chen XX	9	21	16
Q3	(Indonesia) D D Ayustine	11	16
(Japan) S Kawakami	21	21
8	(Thailand) R Intanon	24	21
(Hong Kong) Cheung N Y	22	16
(Hong Kong) Yip P Y	8	10
(Thailand) B Ongbumrungpan	21	21
4	(Spain) C Marín	21	21
(Japan) M Mitani	17	18
(Japan) S Sato	14	21	10
(South Korea) Lee J-m	21	14	21
7	(China) He BJ	18	21	21
(United States) B Zhang	21	16	15
(Chinese Taipei) Chiang M-h	8	14
PFQ	(Denmark) M Blichfeldt	21	21

Second round
1	(Chinese Taipei) Tai T-y	21	21
(Japan) S Kawakami	13	14
8	(Thailand) R Intanon	21	21
(Thailand) B Ongbumrungpan	17	17
4	(Spain) C Marín	18	19
(South Korea) Lee J-m	21	21
7	(China) He BJ	21	21
PFQ	(Denmark) M Blichfeldt	17	12

Quarterfinals
1	(Chinese Taipei) Tai T-y	21	21
8	(Thailand) R Intanon	17	12
(South Korea) Lee J-m	23	10
7	(China) He BJ	25	21

Semifinals
1	(Chinese Taipei) Tai T-y	21	17	21
7	(China) He BJ	14	21	8

=== Bottom half ===
First round
PFQ	(Denmark) L Kjaersfeldt	14	21	10
(India) S Nehwal	21	11	21
Q1	(France) D Lansac	15	18
5	(Japan) A Yamaguchi	21	21
Q2	(Denmark) S H Dahl	12	6
(Thailand) P Chochuwong	21	21
(Malaysia) Sonia C S Y	12	21	12
3	(South Korea) Sung J-h	21	18	21
Q4	(Russia) N Perminova	13	18
(China) Chen YF	21	21
(Indonesia) H Ramadini	21	24
PFQ	(Russia) E Kosetskaya	16	22
(Japan) S Takahashi	21	21
(Thailand) N Jindapol	13	19
(Spain) B Corrales	19	18
2	(India) P. V. Sindhu	21	21

Second round
(India) S Nehwal	9	21
5	(Japan) A Yamaguchi	21	23
(Thailand) P Chochuwong	14	17
3	(South Korea) Sung J-h	21	21
(China) Chen YF	21	21
(Indonesia) H Ramadini	17	9
(Japan) S Takahashi	14	13
2	(India) P. V. Sindhu	21	21

Quarterfinals
5	(Japan) A Yamaguchi	17	21	23
3	(South Korea) Sung J-h	21	15	21
(China) Chen YF	14	14
2	(India) P. V. Sindhu	21	21

Semifinals
5	(Japan) A Yamaguchi	21	21
2	(India) P. V. Sindhu	14	9

=== Finals ===
Semifinals
1	(Chinese Taipei) Tai Tzu-ying	21	17	21
7	(China) He Bingjiao	14	21	8
5	(Japan) Akane Yamaguchi	21	21
2	(India) P. V. Sindhu	14	9

Final
1	(Chinese Taipei) Tai Tzu-ying	21	21
5	(Japan) Akane Yamaguchi	4	16

== Men's doubles ==
=== Seeds ===
1. (Indonesia) Marcus Fernaldi Gideon / Kevin Sanjaya Sukamuljo (withdrew)
2. (Denmark) Mathias Boe / Carsten Mogensen (final)
3. (Japan) Takeshi Kamura / Keigo Sonoda (second round)
4. (China) Li Junhui / Liu Yuchen (first round)
5. (China) Liu Cheng / Zhang Nan (semifinals)
6. (Denmark) Mads Conrad-Petersen / Mads Pieler Kolding (second round)
7. (Chinese Taipei) Lee Jhe-huei / Lee Yang (champion)
8. (Chinese Taipei) Chen Hung-ling / Wang Chi-lin (first round)

=== Top half ===
First round
PFQ	(Belgium) M Dierickx (Belgium) F Golinski	15	14
Q1	(Netherlands) J Arends (Netherlands) R Jille	21	21
PFQ	(Malaysia) Goh S F (Malaysia) Nur Izzuddin	21	18	17
(Japan) T Hoki (Japan) Y Kobayashi	19	21	21
5	(China) Liu C (China) Zhang N	21	21
(Denmark) M Christiansen (Denmark) D Daugaard	18	16
(Malaysia) Goh V S (Malaysia) Teo E Y	21	21
(Hong Kong) Or C C (Hong Kong) Tang C M	10	15
4	(China) Li JH (China) Liu YC	19	13
(Indonesia) F Alfian (Indonesia) M R Ardianto	21	21
(Germany) M Lamsfuss (Germany) M E Seidel	21	15
PFQ	(South Korea) Chung E-s (South Korea) Kim D-y	23	21
7	(Chinese Taipei) Lee J-h (Chinese Taipei) Lee Y	21	21
(Indonesia) H Setiawan (Malaysia) Tan B H	19	15
(Denmark) K Astrup (Denmark) A S Rasmussen	21	21
(Thailand) K Kedren (Thailand) D Puavaranukroh	17	16

Second round
Q1	(Netherlands) J Arends (Netherlands) R Jille	14	21	12
(Japan) T Hoki (Japan) Y Kobayashi	21	18	21
5	(China) Liu C (China) Zhang N	21	21
(Malaysia) Goh V S (Malaysia) Teo E Y	9	9
(Indonesia) F Alfian (Indonesia) M R Ardianto	21	13	25
PFQ	(South Korea) Chung E-s (South Korea) Kim D-y	12	21	23
7	(Chinese Taipei) Lee J-h (Chinese Taipei) Lee Y	21	21
(Denmark) K Astrup (Denmark) A S Rasmussen	13	18

Quarterfinals
(Japan) T Hoki (Japan) Y Kobayashi	15	19
5	(China) Liu C (China) Zhang N	21	21
(Indonesia) F Alfian (Indonesia) M R Ardianto	11	19
7	(Chinese Taipei) Lee J-h (Chinese Taipei) Lee Y	21	21

Semifinals
5	(China) Liu C (China) Zhang N	21	13	19
7	(Chinese Taipei) Lee J-h (Chinese Taipei) Lee Y	19	21	21

=== Bottom half ===
First round
(Indonesia) M Ahsan (Indonesia) R A Saputro	21	21
(Chinese Taipei) Lu C-y (Chinese Taipei) Yang P-h	17	18
PFQ	(China) He JT (China) Tan Q	21	12	21
8	(Chinese Taipei) Chen H-l (Chinese Taipei) Wang C-l	19	21	14
(Russia) V Ivanov (Russia) I Sozonov	21	21
(India) M Attri (India) B. S Reddy	11	13
Q2	(France) T Gicquel (France) R Labar	12	12
3	(Japan) T Kamura (Japan) K Sonoda	21	21
(India) S Rankireddy (India) C Shetty	21	21
Q4	(France) B Kersaudy (France) J Maio	12	14
(England) P Briggs (England) T Wolfenden	14	21	18
6	(Denmark) M Conrad-Petersen (Denmark) M P Kolding	21	16	21
(Malaysia) Ong Y S (Malaysia) Tan W K	22	18	21
(Germany) J R Jansen (Germany) J Zurwonne	20	21	12
Q3	(Poland) M Bochat (Poland) A Cwalina	11	12
2	(Denmark) M Boe (Denmark) C Mogensen	21	21

Second round
(Indonesia) M Ahsan (Indonesia) R A Saputro	13	16
PFQ	(China) He JT (China) Tan Q	21	21
(Russia) V Ivanov (Russia) I Sozonov	21	21
3	(Japan) T Kamura (Japan) K Sonoda	18	16
(India) S Rankireddy (India) C Shetty	22	12	21
6	(Denmark) M Conrad-Petersen (Denmark) M P Kolding	20	21	19
(Malaysia) Ong Y S (Malaysia) Tan W K	16	21	19
2	(Denmark) M Boe (Denmark) C Mogensen	21	19	21

Quarterfinals
PFQ	(China) He JT (China) Tan Q	21	21
(Russia) V Ivanov (Russia) I Sozonov	15	9
(India) S Rankireddy (India) C Shetty	5	21	17
2	(Denmark) M Boe (Denmark) C Mogensen	21	17	21

Semifinals
PFQ	(China) He JT (China) Tan Q	18	19
2	(Denmark) M Boe (Denmark) C Mogensen	21	21

=== Finals ===
Semifinals
5	(China) Liu Cheng (China) Zhang Nan	21	13	19
7	(Chinese Taipei) Lee Jhe-huei (Chinese Taipei) Lee Yang	19	21	21
PFQ	(China) He Jiting (China) Tan Qiang	18	19
2	(Denmark) Mathias Boe (Denmark) Carsten Mogensen	21	21

Final
7	(Chinese Taipei) Lee Jhe-huei (Chinese Taipei) Lee Yang	21	23
2	(Denmark) Mathias Boe (Denmark) Carsten Mogensen	19	21

== Women's doubles ==
=== Seeds ===
1. (Japan) Misaki Matsutomo / Ayaka Takahashi (quarterfinals)
2. (China) Chen Qingchen / Jia Yifan (semifinals)
3. (Denmark) Kamilla Rytter Juhl / Christinna Pedersen (withdrew)
4. (Japan) Yuki Fukushima / Sayaka Hirota (second round)
5. (China) Huang Dongping / Li Yinhui (second round)
6. (South Korea) Chang Ye-na / Jung Kyung-eun (quarterfinals)
7. (Japan) Shiho Tanaka / Koharu Yonemoto (quarterfinals)
8. (Bulgaria) Gabriela Stoeva / Stefani Stoeva (second round)

=== Top half ===
First round
1	(Japan) M Matsutomo (Japan) A Takahashi	21	21
(Netherlands) S Piek (Netherlands) C Seinen	16	14
(England) J Moore (England) V Williams	12	12
(India) A Ponnappa (India) N. S Reddy	21	21
5	(China) Huang DP (China) Li YH	21	21
(England) L Smith (England) S Walker	17	19
(Thailand) J Kititharakul (Thailand) R Prajongjai	21	19	16
(Japan) M Matsumoto (Japan) W Nagahara	16	21	21
PFQ	(France) M Ligneau (France) M Ruano	10	10
Q3	(China) Huang YQ (China) Yu XH	21	21
(Malaysia) Soong F C (Malaysia) Tee J Y	14	8
(South Korea) Lee S-h (South Korea) Shin S-c	21	21
8	(Bulgaria) G Stoeva (Bulgaria) S Stoeva	21	23
(Chinese Taipei) Hsu Y-c (Chinese Taipei) Wu T-j	17	21
(South Korea) Chae Y-j (South Korea) Kim H-r	21	21
(Russia) A Chervyakova (Russia) O Morozova	18	10

Second round
1	(Japan) M Matsutomo (Japan) A Takahashi	21	21
(India) A Ponnappa (India) N. S Reddy	16	14
5	(China) Huang DP (China) Li YH	11	18
(Japan) M Matsumoto (Japan) W Nagahara	21	21
Q3	(China) Huang YQ (China) Yu XH	12	18
(South Korea) Lee S-h (South Korea) Shin S-c	21	21
8	(Bulgaria) G Stoeva (Bulgaria) S Stoeva	17	18
(South Korea) Chae Y-j (South Korea) Kim H-r	21	21

Quarterfinals
1	(Japan) M Matsutomo (Japan) A Takahashi	18	17
(Japan) M Matsumoto (Japan) W Nagahara	21	21
(South Korea) Lee S-h (South Korea) Shin S-c	21	21
(South Korea) Chae Y-j (South Korea) Kim H-r	10	10

Semifinals
(Japan) M Matsumoto (Japan) W Nagahara	12	14
(South Korea) Lee S-h (South Korea) Shin S-c	21	21

=== Bottom half ===
First round
Q1	(England) C Birch (England) J Pugh	21	18	21
(Germany) J Goliszewski (Germany) L Käpplein	7	21	13
(Malaysia) Vivian H K M (Malaysia) Woon K W	22	19
7	(Japan) S Tanaka (Japan) K Yonemoto	24	21
(Denmark) M Fruergaard (Denmark) S Thygesen	17	8
(Indonesia) G Polii (Indonesia) A Rahayu	21	21
Q4	(Netherlands) D Jille (Netherlands) I Van De Aar	11	16
4	(Japan) Y Fukushima (Japan) S Hirota	21	21
(France) É Lefel (France) A Tran	14	20
(Hong Kong) Poon L Y (Hong Kong) Tse Y S	21	22
Q2	(Thailand) S Amitrapai (Thailand) P Chochuwong	10	13
6	(South Korea) Chang Y-n (South Korea) Jung K-e	21	21
(Germany) I Herttrich (Germany) C Nelte	15	15
(China) Du Y (China) Xu Y	21	21
PFQ	(France) D Delrue (France) L Palermo	10	14
2	(China) Chen QC (China) Jia YF	21	21

Second round
Q1	(England) C Birch (England) J Pugh	16	17
7	(Japan) S Tanaka (Japan) K Yonemoto	21	21
(Indonesia) G Polii (Indonesia) A Rahayu	21	21
4	(Japan) Y Fukushima (Japan) S Hirota	19	18
(Hong Kong) Poon L Y (Hong Kong) Tse Y S	18	18
6	(South Korea) Chang Y-n (South Korea) Jung K-e	21	21
(China) Du Y (China) Xu Y	21	18	19
2	(China) Chen QC (China) Jia YF	19	21	21

Quarterfinals
7	(Japan) S Tanaka (Japan) K Yonemoto	21	13	19
(Indonesia) G Polii (Indonesia) A Rahayu	19	21	21
6	(South Korea) Chang Y-n (South Korea) Jung K-e	24	13	16
2	(China) Chen QC (China) Jia YF	22	21	21

Semifinals
(Indonesia) G Polii (Indonesia) A Rahayu	21	21
2	(China) Chen QC (China) Jia YF	5	10

=== Finals ===
Semifinals
(Japan) Mayu Matsumoto (Japan) Wakana Nagahara	12	14
(South Korea) Lee So-hee (South Korea) Shin Seung-chan	21	21
(Indonesia) Greysia Polii (Indonesia) Apriyani Rahayu	21	21
2	(China) Chen Qingchen (China) Jia Yifan	5	10

Final
(South Korea) Lee So-hee (South Korea) Shin Seung-chan	17	15
(Indonesia) Greysia Polii (Indonesia) Apriyani Rahayu	21	21

== Mixed doubles ==
=== Seeds ===
1. (China) Zheng Siwei / Chen Qingchen (final)
2. (China) Lu Kai / Huang Yaqiong (quarterfinals)
3. (Indonesia) Praveen Jordan / Debby Susanto (second round)
4. (Indonesia) Tontowi Ahmad / Liliyana Natsir (champion)
5. (England) Chris Adcock / Gabrielle Adcock (withdrew)
6. (China) Zhang Nan / Li Yinhui (semifinals)
7. (South Korea) Seo Seung-jae / Kim Ha-na (second round)
8. (Malaysia) Tan Kian Meng / Lai Pei Jing (quarterfinals)

=== Top half ===
First round
1	(China) Zheng SW (China) Chen QC	21	21
(Indonesia) H Faisal (Indonesia) G E Widjaja	19	13
(Germany) M Lamsfuss (Germany) I Herttrich	18	16
(China) He JT (China) Du Y	21	21
PFQ	(England) M Ellis (England) L Smith	21	16	12
(Hong Kong) Tang C M (Hong Kong) Tse Y S	17	21	21
(England) B Lane (England) J Pugh	21	20	21
(Netherlands) R Tabeling (Netherlands) C Seinen	15	22	12
3	(Indonesia) P Jordan (Indonesia) D Susanto	21	17	21
Q4	(Denmark) N Nohr (Denmark) S Thygesen	14	21	18
(Netherlands) J Arends (Netherlands) S Piek	21	15
(Thailand) D Puavaranukroh (Thailand) P Supajirakul	23	21
7	(South Korea) Seo S-j (South Korea) Kim H-n	21	21
(Malaysia) Goh S H (Malaysia) S J Lai	16	14
(Denmark) M Christiansen (Denmark) C Pedersen	21	21
PFQ	(Germany) M E Seidel (Germany) L Efler	18	10

Second round
1	(China) Zheng SW (China) Chen QC	21	21
(China) He JT (China) Du Y	17	13
(Hong Kong) Tang C M (Hong Kong) Tse Y S	21	14	16
(England) B Lane (England) J Pugh	13	21	21
3	(Indonesia) P Jordan (Indonesia) D Susanto	16	15
(Thailand) D Puavaranukroh (Thailand) P Supajirakul	21	21
7	(South Korea) Seo S-j (South Korea) Kim H-n	18	19
(Denmark) M Christiansen (Denmark) C Pedersen	21	21

Quarterfinals
1	(China) Zheng SW (China) Chen QC	21	19	21
(England) B Lane (England) J Pugh	18	21	16
(Thailand) D Puavaranukroh (Thailand) P Supajirakul	21	13	19
(Denmark) M Christiansen (Denmark) C Pedersen	13	21	21

Semifinals
1	(China) Zheng SW (China) Chen QC	22	17	21
(Denmark) M Christiansen (Denmark) C Pedersen	20	21	15

=== Bottom half ===
First round
(Denmark) A S Rasmussen (Denmark) L Kjaersfeldt	18	14
(France) R Labar (France) A Fontaine	21	21
(Thailand) N Puangphuapech (Thailand) J Kititharakul	20	13
8	(Malaysia) Tan K M (Malaysia) Lai P J	22	21
Q2	(Russia) I Sozonov (Russia) E Kosetskaya	23	21
Q3	(Thailand) T Isriyanet (Thailand) P Chochuwong	21	17
(India) P J Chopra (India) N. S Reddy	15	12
4	(Indonesia) T Ahmad (Indonesia) L Natsir	21	21
(Chinese Taipei) Lee Y (Chinese Taipei) Hsu Y-c	19	21	21
(South Korea) Kim J-h (South Korea) Lee S-h	21	14	16
(Japan) Y Kobayashi (Japan) M Matsutomo	19	17
6	(China) Zhang N (China) Li YH	21	21
Q1	(Russia) V Durkin (Russia) N Vislova	21	13	21
(Republic of Ireland) S Magee (Republic of Ireland) C Magee	11	21	11
PFQ	(France) B Kersaudy (France) L Palermo	15	12
2	(China) Lu K (China) Huang YQ	21	21

Second round
(France) R Labar (France) A Fontaine	21	11	11
8	(Malaysia) Tan K M (Malaysia) Lai P J	12	21	21
Q2	(Russia) I Sozonov (Russia) E Kosetskaya	16	21	16
4	(Indonesia) T Ahmad (Indonesia) L Natsir	21	17	21
(Chinese Taipei) Lee Y (Chinese Taipei) Hsu Y-c	21	11
6	(China) Zhang N (China) Li YH	23	21
Q1	(Russia) V Durkin (Russia) N Vislova	15	8
2	(China) Lu K (China) Huang YQ	21	21

Quarterfinals
8	(Malaysia) Tan K M (Malaysia) Lai P J	21	14	12
4	(Indonesia) T Ahmad (Indonesia) L Natsir	19	21	21
6	(China) Zhang N (China) Li YH	21	18	21
2	(China) Lu K (China) Huang YQ	19	21	9

Semifinals
4	(Indonesia) T Ahmad (Indonesia) L Natsir	21	21
6	(China) Zhang N (China) Li YH	18	8

=== Finals ===
Semifinals
1	(China) Zheng Siwei (China) Chen Qingchen	22	17	21
(Denmark) Mathias Christiansen (Denmark) Christinna Pedersen	20	21	15
4	(Indonesia) Tontowi Ahmad (Indonesia) Liliyana Natsir	21	21
6	(China) Zhang Nan (China) Li Yinhui	18	8

Final
1	(China) Zheng Siwei (China) Chen Qingchen	20	15
4	(Indonesia) Tontowi Ahmad (Indonesia) Liliyana Natsir	22	21

Preceded by 2016 French Super Series	French Open	Succeeded by 2018 French Super Series
Preceded by 2017 Denmark Super Series Premier	BWF Super Series; 2017 BWF Season	Succeeded by 2017 China Open Super Series Premier
