= Zheng Siwei =

Chinese badminton player (born 1997)

Zheng Siwei 郑思维
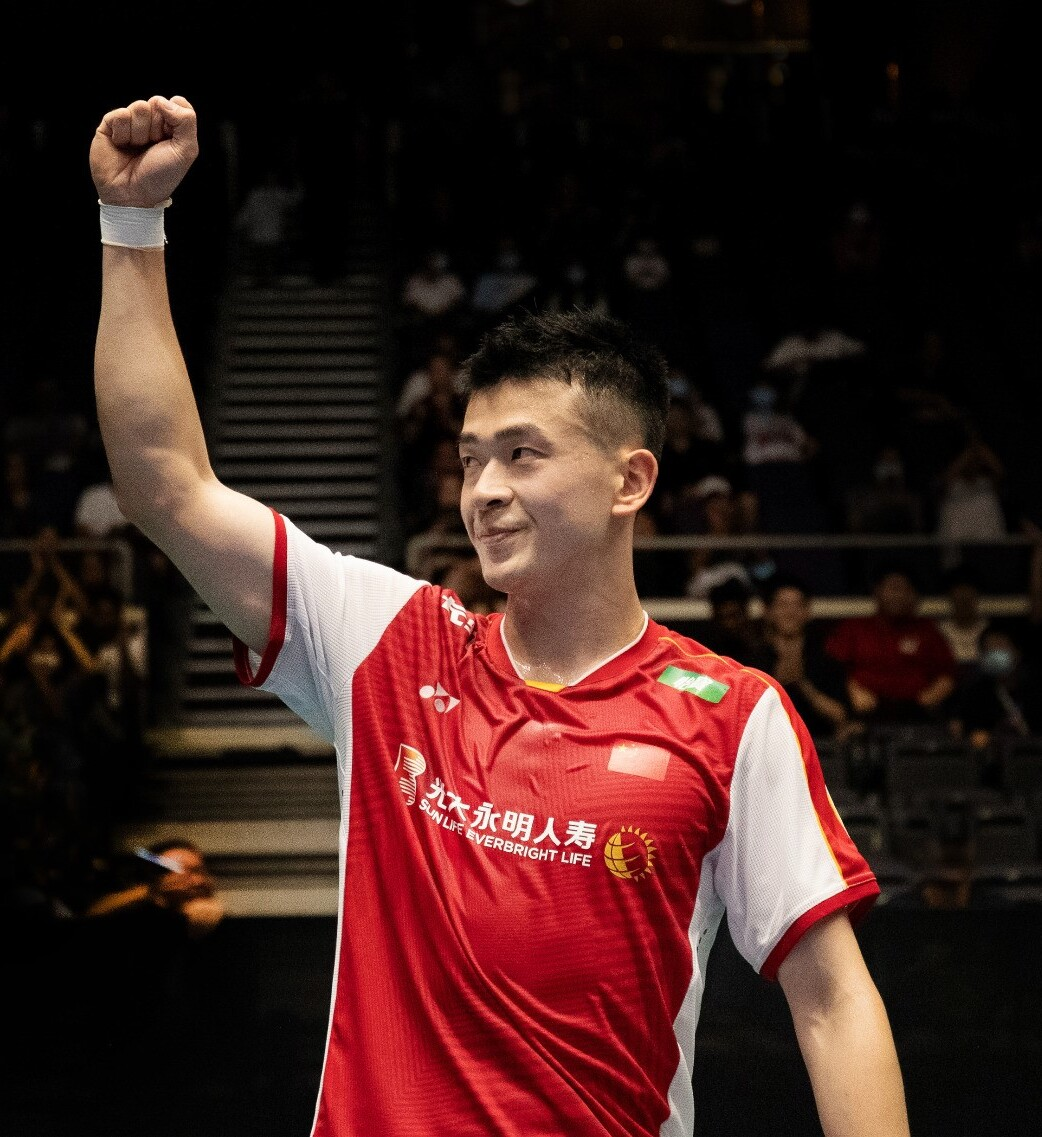
- Zheng at the 2023 Singapore Open

Personal information
- Born: 26 February 1997 (age 29) Wenzhou, Zhejiang, China
- Height: 1.76 m (5 ft 9 in)
- Spouse: Liu Yuwen (m. 2021)

Sport
- Country: China
- Sport: Badminton
- Handedness: Right
- Retired: 15 December 2024

Men's & mixed doubles
- Highest ranking: 35 (MD with Huang Kaixiang, 8 July 2016); 1 (XD with Chen Qingchen, 22 December 2016); 1 (XD with Huang Yaqiong, 9 August 2018)
- BWF profile
Medal record
Men's badminton
Representing China
Olympic Games
Gold medal – first place	2024 Paris	Mixed doubles
Silver medal – second place	2020 Tokyo	Mixed doubles
World Championships
Gold medal – first place	2018 Nanjing	Mixed doubles
Gold medal – first place	2019 Basel	Mixed doubles
Gold medal – first place	2022 Tokyo	Mixed doubles
Silver medal – second place	2017 Glasgow	Mixed doubles
Silver medal – second place	2023 Copenhagen	Mixed doubles
Sudirman Cup
Gold medal – first place	2019 Nanning	Mixed team
Gold medal – first place	2023 Suzhou	Mixed team
Silver medal – second place	2017 Gold Coast	Mixed team
Thomas Cup
Gold medal – first place	2018 Bangkok	Men's team
Asian Games
Gold medal – first place	2018 Jakarta–Palembang	Mixed doubles
Gold medal – first place	2018 Jakarta–Palembang	Men's team
Gold medal – first place	2022 Hangzhou	Mixed doubles
Gold medal – first place	2022 Hangzhou	Men's team
Asian Championships
Gold medal – first place	2022 Manila	Mixed doubles
Silver medal – second place	2023 Dubai	Mixed doubles
Bronze medal – third place	2018 Wuhan	Mixed doubles
Bronze medal – third place	2019 Wuhan	Mixed doubles
Bronze medal – third place	2024 Ningbo	Mixed doubles
Asia Mixed Team Championships
Bronze medal – third place	2017 Ho Chi Minh	Mixed team
World Junior Championships
Gold medal – first place	2014 Alor Setar	Mixed team
Gold medal – first place	2015 Lima	Boys' doubles
Gold medal – first place	2015 Lima	Mixed doubles
Gold medal – first place	2015 Lima	Mixed team
Silver medal – second place	2013 Bangkok	Boys' doubles
Bronze medal – third place	2013 Bangkok	Mixed team
Asian Junior Championships
Gold medal – first place	2013 Kota Kinabalu	Mixed team
Gold medal – first place	2014 Taipei	Boys' doubles
Gold medal – first place	2014 Taipei	Mixed team
Gold medal – first place	2015 Bangkok	Boys' doubles
Gold medal – first place	2015 Bangkok	Mixed doubles
Gold medal – first place	2015 Bangkok	Mixed team
Silver medal – second place	2013 Kota Kinabalu	Boys' doubles

Zheng Siwei (Chinese: 郑思维; pinyin: Zhèng Sīwéi; born 26 February 1997) is a Chinese badminton player specializing in doubles. He is an Olympic gold medalist, a three-time World Champion and two-time Asian Games gold medalist in the mixed doubles with his current partner Huang Yaqiong. He helped the national team clinch the 2018 Thomas Cup and also 2019 and 2023 Sudirman Cups.

Zheng joined the national team in 2013, and excelled in the junior events, collecting four gold medals, a silver and a bronze at the World Junior Championships, also six golds and a silver at the Asian Junior Championships from 2013 to 2015. He also participated in the senior event, winning doubles titles in New Zealand and Brasil Open. For his achievements in 2015, the BWF awarded him the Eddy Choong Most Promising Player of the Year.

Zheng achieved his breakthrough in 2016 by achieving the world number 1 ranking in mixed doubles partnering with Chen Qingchen in December 2016. He and Chen reached thirteen Superseries finals, won the year-end tournament Dubai World Superseries Finals in 2016 and 2017, and the silver medal at the 2017 World Championships. He forged a new mixed doubles pairing with Huang Yaqiong in November 2017, and started their partnership by winning the China, Hong Kong and Macau Open in consecutive weeks. He again ascended to the mixed doubles world number 1 ranking on 9 August 2018, with the achievement of seven 2018 World Tour titles, and gold medals at the World Championships and Asian Games.

In November 2024, Zheng announced his retirement from international badminton. The 2024 BWF World Tour Finals was his final tournament.

== Career ==
=== 2018 ===
Zheng's 2018 season began in January with a runner-up finish at the Malaysia Masters with Huang Yaqiong, followed immediately by a title victory at the Indonesia Masters. In March, he reached the final of the All England Open to finish as runner-up, and later secured a bronze medal at the Asian Championships in April. His momentum shifted to team success in May as he helped China reclaim the Thomas Cup trophy. In June, marked the start of an incredible winning streak, beginning with a title at the Malaysia Open, followed by capturing the gold medal at the World Championships in August. Later that month at the Asian Games in Jakarta, he further solidified his status by winning two gold medals in both the men's team and mixed doubles events. His relentless form continued as he secured back-to-back titles at the Japan and China Open in September, followed by another double-victory at the Denmark and French Open in October. After clinching the Fuzhou China Open title in November, Zheng and Huang concluded his prolific year in December as the runner-up at the BWF World Tour Finals.

=== 2019 ===
Zheng's started the 2019 season in January by defending his Indonesia Masters title and followed it up with a landmark victory in March, capturing his first-ever All England Open crown. In April, he secured his third consecutive Malaysia Open title, before earning a bronze medal at the Asian Championships, later transitioning to team duties in May to help China reclaim the Sudirman Cup. His mid-season momentum remained unstoppable as he won the Indonesia Open in July for the first time, and successfully retained his gold medal at the World Championships in August. September saw him claim a third straight China Open title, though he settled for a runner-up finish at the Korea Open shortly after. His consistency continued through the autumn with runner-up finishes at both the French Open in October and the Fuzhou China Open in November. Finally, Zheng concluded his stellar campaign in December by winning his third season-ending finale tournament, the BWF World Tour Finals.

=== 2020–2022 ===
Zheng opened 2020 with back-to-back titles at the Malaysia and Indonesia Masters before the pandemic disrupted the global schedule. In 2021, Zheng with his partner Huang Yaqiong, competed at the 2020 Summer Olympics as the top seeds. They won a silver medal after being defeated by their compatriots Wang Yilyu and Huang Dongping in the final in a close rubber game.

The early months of 2022 were marked by a brief experimental partnership with Zhang Shuxian; however, the duo faced challenges finding their rhythm, suffering a first-round exit at the German Open against Jones Ralfy Jansen and Linda Efler, and a quarter-final defeat at the Korea Masters to Jin Yong and Lee Yu-lim. Upon reuniting with Huang Yaqiong, Zheng immediately regained his unstoppable form, with a winning streak that began with a gold medal at the Asian Championships in April. This momentum swept through with five consecutive titles at the Thailand Open, Indonesia Masters, Indonesia Open, Malaysia Open, and Malaysia Masters. In August, he reached a monumental milestone by capturing his third World Championships gold medal. His momentum carried through the European leg with victories at the Denmark and French Open in October, before he finally punctuated his sensational 2022 campaign with ten titles by winning the World Tour Finals in December, with an award as the Pair of The Year by the Badminton World Federation.

=== 2023 ===
Zheng and Huang competed as top seeds and three-time defending champions in the Malaysia Open at the start of the year. They defended their title without dropping a set throughout the tournament. However, a week later they lost in the semi-finals in the India Open to Yuta Watanabe and Arisa Higashino. In March, the pair of Zheng and Huang participated in the All England Open and were crowned champions for the second time in their career as a pair by beating Seo Seung-jae and Chae Yoo-jung. At the end of April, Zheng and Huang participated in the Asian Championships as defending champions, and finished with a silver medal after losing to their younger compatriots Jiang Zhenbang and Wei Yaxin. In May, the pair then helped the Chinese team to lift the Sudirman Cup trophy by winning all 4 matches they played. In June, after losing to Kim Won-ho and Jeong Na-eun in the quarter-finals of the Singapore, The pair won their third Super 1000 title of the season in the Indonesia Open, defeating Watanabe and Higashino in straight games in the final.

In August, Zheng and Huang entered the World Championships as the top seeds and defending champions. Zheng reached his fifth final without dropping a single game, but the duo lost to Seo Seung-jae and Chae Yoo-jung, a pair they never lost to in 9 meetings, in three close games. In October, Zheng and Huang, who were 2018 Asian Games champions, successfully defended their title they won 5 years ago at the 2022 Asian Games, avenging their defeat to Seo and Chae in the semi-finals and defeating Watanabe and Higashino in the final in straight games. In October, he reached the final of the Denmark Open, finishing as the runner-up after a hard-fought match against compatriots Feng Yanzhe and Huang Dongping, followed by a quarter-final appearance at the French Open. His form surged in November as he secured back-to-back titles, first capturing the Kumamoto Japan Masters and then dominating the China Masters in Shenzhen. In December, Zheng achieved the honour of being the first shuttler ever to secure five mixed doubles titles at the World Tour Finals when he with his partner Huang Yaqiong defeated Feng Yanzhe and Huang Dongping. In the semi-finals, it was a masterclass display as they steamrolled reigning world champions Seo and Chae.

=== 2024–2025 ===
Zheng and Huang competed as the top seeds and four-time defending champions at the Malaysia Open. However, they lost in the quarter-finals to Kim Won-ho and Jeong Na-eun, in three games. After the match, Zheng said that they were ill. As a result, they withdrew from the India Open the following week.

However, they returned to competition at the Indonesia Masters, which was held a week after the India Open, and they won the title.

In May, they competed at the Singapore Open, and won the title, which was their first title as a pair at the tournament. A week later, they competed at the Indonesia Open as the two-time defending champions. However, they were outclassed in the final in two straight games by compatriats Jiang Zhenbang and Wei Yaxin.

In July, after being out of international competition for more than a month, Zheng and Huang returned to the Olympics for the second time. This time, they came back much stronger by winning the gold medal, winning all of their matches in two straight games. In the final, they produced a masterclass performance against Kim Won-ho and Jeong Na-eun, with a final score of 21–8, 21–11.

In November, Zheng announced his retirement from international badminton, citing needing a balance between career and family. This was a result of his family welcoming his second child, a daughter. The following month, Zheng and Huang won the World Tour Finals after defeating Chen Tang Jie and Toh Ee Wei in a grueling three sets match of 21–18, 14–21, 21–17. He officially retired from the national team and international competitions shortly thereafter, and his farewell party was held after the 2025 BWF World Tour Finals in Hangzhou.

== Achievements ==
=== Olympic Games ===
Mixed doubles
Year	Venue	Partner	Opponent	Score	Result	Ref.
2020	Musashino Forest Sport Plaza, Tokyo, Japan	(China) Huang Yaqiong	(China) Wang Yilyu (China) Huang Dongping	17–21, 21–17, 19–21	Silver	
2024	Porte de La Chapelle Arena, Paris, France	(China) Huang Yaqiong	(South Korea) Kim Won-ho (South Korea) Jeong Na-eun	21–8, 21–11	Gold	

=== World Championships ===
Mixed doubles
Year	Venue	Partner	Opponent	Score	Result	Ref.
2017	Emirates Arena, Glasgow, Scotland	(China) Chen Qingchen	(Indonesia) Tontowi Ahmad (Indonesia) Liliyana Natsir	21–15, 16–21, 15–21	Silver	
2018	Nanjing Youth Olympic Sports Park, Nanjing, China	(China) Huang Yaqiong	(China) Wang Yilyu (China) Huang Dongping	21–17, 21–19	Gold	
2019	St. Jakobshalle, Basel, Switzerland	(China) Huang Yaqiong	(Thailand) Dechapol Puavaranukroh (Thailand) Sapsiree Taerattanachai	21–8, 21–12	Gold	
2022	Tokyo Metropolitan Gymnasium, Tokyo, Japan	(China) Huang Yaqiong	(Japan) Yuta Watanabe (Japan) Arisa Higashino	21–13, 21–16	Gold	
2023	Royal Arena, Copenhagen, Denmark	(China) Huang Yaqiong	(South Korea) Seo Seung-jae (South Korea) Chae Yoo-jung	17–21, 21–10, 18–21	Silver	

=== Asian Games ===
Mixed doubles
Year	Venue	Partner	Opponent	Score	Result	Ref.
2018	Istora Gelora Bung Karno, Jakarta, Indonesia	(China) Huang Yaqiong	(Hong Kong) Tang Chun Man (Hong Kong) Tse Ying Suet	21–8, 21–15	Gold	
2022	Binjiang Gymnasium, Hangzhou, China	(China) Huang Yaqiong	(Japan) Yuta Watanabe (Japan) Arisa Higashino	21–15, 21–14	Gold	

=== Asian Championships ===
Mixed doubles
Year	Venue	Partner	Opponent	Score	Result	Ref.
2018	Wuhan Sports Center Gymnasium, Wuhan, China	(China) Huang Yaqiong	(Indonesia) Tontowi Ahmad (Indonesia) Liliyana Natsir	11–21, 13–21	Bronze	
2019	Wuhan Sports Center Gymnasium, Wuhan, China	(China) Huang Yaqiong	(China) He Jiting (China) Du Yue	14–21, 18–21	Bronze	
2022	Muntinlupa Sports Complex, Metro Manila, Philippines	(China) Huang Yaqiong	(China) Wang Yilyu (China) Huang Dongping	21–17, 21–8	Gold	
2023	Sheikh Rashid Bin Hamdan Indoor Hall, Dubai, United Arab Emirates	(China) Huang Yaqiong	(China) Jiang Zhenbang (China) Wei Yaxin	15–21, 14–21	Silver	
2024	Ningbo Olympic Sports Center Gymnasium, Ningbo, China	(China) Huang Yaqiong	(South Korea) Seo Seung-jae (South Korea) Chae Yoo-jung	21–9, 13–21, 16–21	Bronze	

=== World Junior Championships ===
Boys' doubles
Year	Venue	Partner	Opponent	Score	Result	Ref.
2013	Hua Mark Indoor Stadium, Bangkok, Thailand	(China) Huang Kaixiang	(China) Li Junhui (China) Liu Yuchen	21–14, 13–21, 20–22	Silver	
2015	Centro de Alto Rendimiento de la Videna, Lima, Peru	(China) He Jiting	(Denmark) Joel Eipe (Denmark) Frederik Søgaard	21–14, 21–16	Gold	

Mixed doubles
Year	Venue	Partner	Opponent	Score	Result	Ref.
2015	Centro de Alto Rendimiento de la Videna, Lima, Peru	(China) Chen Qingchen	(China) He Jiting (China) Du Yue	21–19, 21–8	Gold	

=== Asian Junior Championships ===
Boys' doubles
Year	Venue	Partner	Opponent	Score	Result	Ref.
2013	Likas Indoor Stadium, Kota Kinabalu, Malaysia	(China) Huang Kaixiang	(China) Li Junhui (China) Liu Yuchen	15–21, 14–21	Silver	
2014	Taipei Gymnasium, Taipei, Taiwan	(China) Huang Kaixiang	(South Korea) Kim Jae-hwan (South Korea) Kim Jung-ho	21–16, 21–14	Gold	
2015	CPB Badminton Training Center, Bangkok, Thailand	(China) He Jiting	(China) Han Chengkai (China) Zhou Haodong	21–19, 18–21, 21–18	Gold	

Mixed doubles
Year	Venue	Partner	Opponent	Score	Result	Ref.
2015	CPB Badminton Training Center, Bangkok, Thailand	(China) Chen Qingchen	(South Korea) Choi Jong-woo (South Korea) Kim Hye-jeong	21–8, 21–12	Gold	

=== BWF World Tour (33 titles, 8 runners-up) ===
The BWF World Tour, which was announced on 19 March 2017 and implemented in 2018, is a series of elite badminton tournaments sanctioned by the Badminton World Federation (BWF). The BWF World Tour is divided into levels of World Tour Finals, Super 1000, Super 750, Super 500, Super 300, and the BWF Tour Super 100.

Mixed doubles

Zheng, along with his partner Huang Yaqiong, made history as they were the first player/pair to achieve a calendar year grand slam in Super 750 events (2018) and Super 1000 events (2019).

Year	Tournament	Level	Partner	Opponent	Score	Result	Ref.
2018	Malaysia Masters	Super 500	(China) Huang Yaqiong	(Hong Kong) Tang Chun Man (Hong Kong) Tse Ying Suet	21–19, 20–22, 18–21	(silver) Runner-up	
2018	Indonesia Masters	Super 500	(China) Huang Yaqiong	(Indonesia) Tontowi Ahmad (Indonesia) Liliyana Natsir	21–14, 21–11	(gold) Winner	
2018	All England Open	Super 1000	(China) Huang Yaqiong	(Japan) Yuta Watanabe (Japan) Arisa Higashino	21–15, 20–22, 16–21	(silver) Runner-up	
2018	Malaysia Open	Super 750	(China) Huang Yaqiong	(China) Wang Yilyu (China) Huang Dongping	21–19, 21–18	(gold) Winner	
2018	Japan Open	Super 750	(China) Huang Yaqiong	(China) Wang Yilyu (China) Huang Dongping	21–19, 21–8	(gold) Winner	
2018	China Open	Super 1000	(China) Huang Yaqiong	(China) Zhang Nan (China) Li Yinhui	21–16, 21–9	(gold) Winner	
2018	Denmark Open	Super 750	(China) Huang Yaqiong	(Thailand) Dechapol Puavaranukroh (Thailand) Sapsiree Taerattanachai	21–16, 21–13	(gold) Winner	
2018	French Open	Super 750	(China) Huang Yaqiong	(South Korea) Seo Seung-jae (South Korea) Chae Yoo-jung	21–19, 21–14	(gold) Winner	
2018	Fuzhou China Open	Super 750	(China) Huang Yaqiong	(China) Wang Yilyu (China) Huang Dongping	21–15, 11–21, 21–19	(gold) Winner	
2018	BWF World Tour Finals	World Tour Finals	(China) Huang Yaqiong	(China) Wang Yilyu (China) Huang Dongping	21–23, 21–16, 18–21	(silver) Runner-up	
2019	Indonesia Masters	Super 500	(China) Huang Yaqiong	(Indonesia) Tontowi Ahmad (Indonesia) Liliyana Natsir	19–21, 21–19, 21–16	(gold) Winner	
2019	All England Open	Super 1000	(China) Huang Yaqiong	(Japan) Yuta Watanabe (Japan) Arisa Higashino	21–17, 22–20	(gold) Winner	
2019	Malaysia Open	Super 750	(China) Huang Yaqiong	(China) Wang Yilyu (China) Huang Dongping	21–17, 21–13	(gold) Winner	
2019	Indonesia Open	Super 1000	(China) Huang Yaqiong	(China) Wang Yilyu (China) Huang Dongping	21–13, 21–18	(gold) Winner	
2019	China Open	Super 1000	(China) Huang Yaqiong	(China) Wang Yilyu (China) Huang Dongping	21–17, 15–21, 21–16	(gold) Winner	
2019	Korea Open	Super 500	(China) Huang Yaqiong	(Thailand) Dechapol Puavaranukroh (Thailand) Sapsiree Taerattanachai	14–21, 13–21	(silver) Runner-up	
2019	French Open	Super 750	(China) Huang Yaqiong	(Indonesia) Praveen Jordan (Indonesia) Melati Daeva Oktavianti	24–22, 16–21, 12–21	(silver) Runner-up	
2019	Fuzhou China Open	Super 750	(China) Huang Yaqiong	(China) Wang Yilyu (China) Huang Dongping	14–21, 13–21	(silver) Runner-up	
2019	BWF World Tour Finals	World Tour Finals	(China) Huang Yaqiong	(China) Wang Yilyu (China) Huang Dongping	21–14, 21–14	(gold) Winner	
2020	Malaysia Masters	Super 500	(China) Huang Yaqiong	(China) Wang Yilyu (China) Huang Dongping	21–19, 21–12	(gold) Winner	
2020	Indonesia Masters	Super 500	(China) Huang Yaqiong	(China) Wang Yilyu (China) Huang Dongping	21–9, 21–9	(gold) Winner	
2022	Thailand Open	Super 500	(China) Huang Yaqiong	(Thailand) Dechapol Puavaranukroh (Thailand) Sapsiree Taerattanachai	21–12, 18–21, 21–14	(gold) Winner	
2022	Indonesia Masters	Super 500	(China) Huang Yaqiong	(France) Thom Gicquel (France) Delphine Delrue	21–13, 21–14	(gold) Winner	
2022	Indonesia Open	Super 1000	(China) Huang Yaqiong	(Japan) Yuta Watanabe (Japan) Arisa Higashino	21–14, 21–16	(gold) Winner	
2022	Malaysia Open	Super 750	(China) Huang Yaqiong	(Thailand) Dechapol Puavaranukroh (Thailand) Sapsiree Taerattanachai	21–13, 21–18	(gold) Winner	
2022	Malaysia Masters	Super 500	(China) Huang Yaqiong	(Indonesia) Rinov Rivaldy (Indonesia) Pitha Haningtyas Mentari	21–17, 21–12	(gold) Winner	
2022	Denmark Open	Super 750	(China) Huang Yaqiong	(China) Feng Yanzhe (China) Huang Dongping	21–19, 20–22, 21–19	(gold) Winner	
2022	French Open	Super 750	(China) Huang Yaqiong	(Netherlands) Robin Tabeling (Netherlands) Selena Piek	21–16, 14–21, 22–20	(gold) Winner	
2022	BWF World Tour Finals	World Tour Finals	(China) Huang Yaqiong	(Thailand) Dechapol Puavaranukroh (Thailand) Sapsiree Taerattanachai	21–19, 18–21, 21–13	(gold) Winner	
2023	Malaysia Open	Super 1000	(China) Huang Yaqiong	(Japan) Yuta Watanabe (Japan) Arisa Higashino	21–19, 21–11	(gold) Winner	
2023	All England Open	Super 1000	(China) Huang Yaqiong	(South Korea) Seo Seung-jae (South Korea) Chae Yoo-jung	21–16, 16–21, 21–12	(gold) Winner	
2023	Indonesia Open	Super 1000	(China) Huang Yaqiong	(Japan) Yuta Watanabe (Japan) Arisa Higashino	21–14, 21–11	(gold) Winner	
2023	Denmark Open	Super 750	(China) Huang Yaqiong	(China) Feng Yanzhe (China) Huang Dongping	21–16, 15–21, 24–26	(silver) Runner-up	
2023	Japan Masters	Super 500	(China) Huang Yaqiong	(China) Feng Yanzhe (China) Huang Dongping	25–23, 21–9	(gold) Winner	
2023	China Masters	Super 750	(China) Huang Yaqiong	(South Korea) Seo Seung-jae (South Korea) Chae Yoo-jung	21–10, 21–11	(gold) Winner	
2023	BWF World Tour Finals	World Tour Finals	(China) Huang Yaqiong	(China) Feng Yanzhe (China) Huang Dongping	21–11, 21–18	(gold) Winner	
2024	Indonesia Masters	Super 500	(China) Huang Yaqiong	(Japan) Hiroki Midorikawa (Japan) Natsu Saito	21–15, 21–16	(gold) Winner	
2024	All England Open	Super 1000	(China) Huang Yaqiong	(Japan) Yuta Watanabe (Japan) Arisa Higashino	21–16, 21–11	(gold) Winner	
2024	Singapore Open	Super 750	(China) Huang Yaqiong	(Chinese Taipei) Yang Po-hsuan (Chinese Taipei) Hu Ling-fang	21–11, 21–19	(gold) Winner	
2024	Indonesia Open	Super 1000	(China) Huang Yaqiong	(China) Jiang Zhenbang (China) Wei Yaxin	11–21, 14–21	(silver) Runner-up	
2024	BWF World Tour Finals	World Tour Finals	(China) Huang Yaqiong	(Malaysia) Chen Tang Jie (Malaysia) Toh Ee Wei	21–18, 14–21, 21–17	(gold) Winner	

=== BWF Superseries (8 titles, 8 runners-up) ===
The BWF Superseries, which was launched on 14 December 2006 and implemented in 2007, is a series of elite badminton tournaments, sanctioned by the Badminton World Federation (BWF). BWF Superseries levels are Superseries and Superseries Premier. A season of Superseries consists of twelve tournaments around the world that have been introduced since 2011. Successful players are invited to the Superseries Finals, which are held at the end of each year.

Men's doubles
Year	Tournament	Partner	Opponent	Score	Result
2017	Malaysia Open	(China) Fu Haifeng	(Indonesia) Marcus Fernaldi Gideon (Indonesia) Kevin Sanjaya Sukamuljo	14–21, 21–14, 12–21	(silver) Runner-up

Mixed doubles
Year	Tournament	Partner	Opponent	Score	Result
2016	Australian Open	(China) Chen Qingchen	(China) Lu Kai (China) Huang Yaqiong	18–21, 14–21	(silver) Runner-up
2016	Japan Open	(China) Chen Qingchen	(South Korea) Ko Sung-hyun (South Korea) Kim Ha-na	21–10, 21–15	(gold) Winner
2016	Korea Open	(China) Chen Qingchen	(South Korea) Ko Sung-hyun (South Korea) Kim Ha-na	14–21, 19–21	(silver) Runner-up
2016	Denmark Open	(China) Chen Qingchen	(Denmark) Joachim Fischer Nielsen (Denmark) Christinna Pedersen	16–21, 20–22	(silver) Runner-up
2016	French Open	(China) Chen Qingchen	(South Korea) Ko Sung-hyun (South Korea) Kim Ha-na	21–16, 21–15	(gold) Winner
2016	Dubai World Superseries Finals	(China) Chen Qingchen	(England) Chris Adcock (England) Gabby Adcock	21–12, 21–12	(gold) Winner
2017	India Open	(China) Chen Qingchen	(China) Lu Kai (China) Huang Yaqiong	24–22, 14–21, 17–21	(silver) Runner-up
2017	Malaysia Open	(China) Chen Qingchen	(China) Lu Kai (China) Huang Yaqiong	21–15, 21–18	(gold) Winner
2017	Indonesia Open	(China) Chen Qingchen	(Indonesia) Tontowi Ahmad (Indonesia) Liliyana Natsir	20–22, 15–21	(silver) Runner-up
2017	Australian Open	(China) Chen Qingchen	(Indonesia) Praveen Jordan (Indonesia) Debby Susanto	18–21, 21–14, 21–17	(gold) Winner
2017	Denmark Open	(China) Chen Qingchen	(Hong Kong) Tang Chun Man (Hong Kong) Tse Ying Suet	22–24, 21–19, 21–23	(silver) Runner-up
2017	French Open	(China) Chen Qingchen	(Indonesia) Tontowi Ahmad (Indonesia) Liliyana Natsir	20–22, 15–21	(silver) Runner-up
2017	China Open	(China) Huang Yaqiong	(Denmark) Mathias Christiansen (Denmark) Christinna Pedersen	21–15, 21–11	(gold) Winner
2017	Hong Kong Open	(China) Huang Yaqiong	(Denmark) Mathias Christiansen (Denmark) Christinna Pedersen	21–15, 21–13	(gold) Winner
2017	Dubai World Superseries Finals	(China) Chen Qingchen	(Hong Kong) Tang Chun Man (Hong Kong) Tse Ying Suet	21–15, 22–20	(gold) Winner

BWF Super Series Finals tournament
BWF Super Series Premier tournament
BWF Super Series tournament

=== BWF Grand Prix (10 titles, 3 runners-up) ===
The BWF Grand Prix had two levels, the Grand Prix and Grand Prix Gold. It was a series of badminton tournaments sanctioned by the Badminton World Federation (BWF) and played between 2007 and 2017.

Men's doubles
Year	Tournament	Partner	Opponent	Score	Result
2014	India Grand Prix Gold	(China) Huang Kaixiang	(China) Li Junhui (China) Liu Yuchen	17–21, 21–19, 11–21	(silver) Runner-up
2015	New Zealand Open	(China) Huang Kaixiang	(Indonesia) Fajar Alfian (Indonesia) Muhammad Rian Ardianto	16–21, 21–17, 21–9	(gold) Winner
2015	Brasil Open	(China) Huang Kaixiang	(China) Wang Yilyu (China) Zhang Wen	22–24, 21–10, 21–14	(gold) Winner

Mixed doubles
Year	Tournament	Partner	Opponent	Score	Result
2014	Bitburger Open	(China) Chen Qingchen	(Indonesia) Alfian Eko Prasetya (Indonesia) Annisa Saufika	21–11, 21–13	(gold) Winner
2015	New Zealand Open	(China) Chen Qingchen	(China) Yu Xiaoyu (China) Xia Huan	21–14, 21–8	(gold) Winner
2015	Brasil Open	(China) Chen Qingchen	(Russia) Evgenij Dremin (Russia) Evgenia Dimova	21–12, 21–10	(gold) Winner
2016	Malaysia Masters	(China) Li Yinhui	(Malaysia) Tan Kian Meng (Malaysia) Lai Pei Jing	21–14, 21–19	(gold) Winner
2016	Thailand Masters	(China) Chen Qingchen	(Malaysia) Chan Peng Soon (Malaysia) Goh Liu Ying	21–17, 21–15	(gold) Winner
2016	New Zealand Open	(China) Li Yinhui	(Malaysia) Chan Peng Soon (Malaysia) Goh Liu Ying	19–21, 20–22	(silver) Runner-up
2016	China Masters	(China) Chen Qingchen	(China) Xu Chen (China) Ma Jin	17–21, 15–21	(silver) Runner-up
2016	Chinese Taipei Open	(China) Chen Qingchen	(Malaysia) Tan Kian Meng (Malaysia) Lai Pei Jing	21–13, 21–16	(gold) Winner
2016	Bitburger Open	(China) Chen Qingchen	(England) Chris Adcock (England) Gabby Adcock	21–16, 23–21	(gold) Winner
2017	Macau Open	(China) Huang Yaqiong	(South Korea) Seo Seung-jae (South Korea) Kim Ha-na	21–14, 21–11	(gold) Winner

BWF Grand Prix Gold tournament
BWF Grand Prix tournament

=== BWF International Challenge/Series (1 title) ===
Mixed doubles
Year	Tournament	Partner	Opponent	Score	Result
2015	China International	(China) Chen Qingchen	(China) Liu Yuchen (China) Yu Xiaohan	15–21, 21–12, 21–13	(gold) Winner

BWF International Challenge tournament
BWF International Series tournament

== Performance timeline ==
Key

W	Won	F	Finalist	SF	Semi-finalist
QF	Quarter-finalist	#R	Rounds 4, 3, 2, 1	RR	Round-robin stage
Q#	Qualification round	A	Absent	w/d	Withdrew
G	Gold	S	Silver	B	Bronze
NH	Not held	N/A	Not applicable	DNQ	Did not qualify

=== National team ===
- Junior level

Team events	2013	2014	2015
Asian Junior Championships	G	G	G
World Junior Championships	B	G	G

- Senior level

Team events	2017	2018	2019	2020	2021	2022	2023
Asia Mixed Team Championships	B	NH	A	NH			A
Asian Games	NH	G	NH			G	NH
Thomas Cup	NH	G	NH	A	NH	A	NH
Sudirman Cup	S	NH	G	NH	A	NH	G

=== Individual competitions ===
==== Junior level ====
- Boys' singles

Event	2013
Asian Junior Championships	3R

- Boys' doubles

Event	2013	2014	2015
Asian Junior Championships	S	G	G
World Junior Championships	S	QF	G

- Mixed doubles

Event	2015
Asian Junior Championships	G
World Junior Championships	G

==== Senior level ====
===== Men's doubles =====
Tournament	BWF Superseries / Grand Prix					BWF World Tour	Best
Tournament	2013	2014	2015	2016	2017	2018	Best
Thailand Masters	NH			SF	A		SF ('16)
German Open	A				QF	A	QF ('17)
All England Open	A				QF	A	QF ('17)
Malaysia Masters	A			1R	A		1R ('16)
New Zealand Open	A		W	SF	A		W ('15)
Australian Open	A			SF	A		SF ('16)
Malaysia Open	A				F	A	F ('17)
Thailand Open	A	NH	1R	A			1R ('15)
Korea Open	A			2R	A		2R ('16)
Chinese Taipei Open	A	1R	A	SF	A		SF ('16)
China Open	A	1R	A	2R	2R	A	2R ('16, '17)
Japan Open	A			1R	A		1R ('16)
Syed Modi International	NH	F	A				F ('14)
French Open	A			1R	A		1R ('16)
Hylo Open	A	1R	A				1R ('14)
Macau Open	2R	2R	A				2R ('13, '14)
China Masters	QF	A	1R	SF	A	1R	SF ('16)
Hong Kong Open	A			2R	A		2R ('16)
Indonesia Masters	1R	A			NH	2R	2R ('18)
Indonesia Open	A			QF	1R	A	QF ('16)
Brasil Open	NH	A	W	A	NH		W ('15)
Year-end ranking	126	89	86	53	110	279	35
Tournament	2013	2014	2015	2016	2017	2018	Best

===== Mixed doubles =====
Event	2017	2018	2019	2020	2021	2022	2023	2024
Asian Championships	QF	B	B	NH		G	S	B
Asian Games	NH	G	NH			G	NH	
World Championships	S	G	G	NH	2R	G	S	NH
Olympic Games	NH			S	NH			G

Tournament	BWF Superseries / Grand Prix				BWF World Tour							Best
Tournament	2014	2015	2016	2017	2018	2019	2020	2021	2022	2023	2024	Best
Malaysia Open	A			W	W	W	NH		W	W	QF	W ('17, '18, '19, '22, '23)
India Open	A			F	A		NH		A	SF	w/d	F ('17)
Indonesia Masters	A			NH	W	W	W	A	W	A	W	W ('18, '19, '20, '22, '24)
Thailand Masters	NH		W	A				NH		A		W ('16)
German Open	A						NH		1R	A		1R ('22)
French Open	A		W	F	W	F	NH	A	W	QF	QF	W ('16, '18, '22)
All England Open	A			2R	F	W	2R	A	SF	W	W	W ('19, '23, '24)
Swiss Open	A			SF	A		NH	A				SF ('17)
Malaysia Masters	A		W	A	F	A	W	NH	W	A		W ('16, '20, '22)
Thailand Open	NH	2R	A					NH	W	A		W ('22)
Singapore Open	A			w/d	A	SF	NH		w/d	QF	W	W ('24)
Indonesia Open	A		1R	F	SF	W	NH	A	W	W	F	W ('19, '22, '23)
Australian Open	A		F	W	A		NH		A			W ('17)
Japan Open	A		W	A	W	QF	NH		SF	SF	A	W ('16, '18)
Korea Open	A		F	w/d	1R	F	NH		A	QF	A	F ('16, '19)
Chinese Taipei Open	A		W	A			NH		A			W ('16)
Hong Kong Open	A		2R	W	A		NH			A		W ('17)
China Open	SF	A	QF	W	W	W	NH			QF	w/d	W ('17, '18, '19)
Macau Open	A		w/d	W	A		NH				A	W ('17)
Denmark Open	A		F	F	W	QF	A		W	F	A	W ('18, '22)
Hylo Open	W	A	W	A								W ('14, '16)
Korea Masters	A						NH		QF	A		QF ('22)
Japan Masters	NH									W	A	W ('23)
China Masters	A	2R	F	A	W	F	NH			W	A	W ('18, '23)
Syed Modi International	QF	A					NH		A			QF ('14)
Superseries / World Tour Finals	DNQ		W	W	F	W	DNQ		W	W	W	W ('16, '17, '19, '22, '23, '24)
Brasil Open	A	W	A	NH								W ('15)
New Zealand Open	A	W	F	A			NH			N/A		W ('15)
Year-end ranking	83	50	1	1	1	1	1	2	1	1	ret.	1
Tournament	2014	2015	2016	2017	2018	2019	2020	2021	2022	2023	2024	Best
