= Ren Xiangyu =

Chinese badminton player (born 1998)

Ren Xiangyu 任翔宇
Personal information
- Born: 23 October 1998 (age 28) Luzhou, Sichuan, China
- Years active: 2015–present
- Height: 1.80 m (5 ft 11 in)

Sport
- Country: China
- Sport: Badminton
- Handedness: Right

Men's & mixed doubles
- Highest ranking: 4 (MD with He Jiting, 22 October 2024); 16 (MD with Ou Xuanyi, 19 April 2019); 33 (XD with Zhou Chaomin, 5 November 2019)
- Current ranking: 27 (MD with He Jiting, 10 November 2026)
- BWF profile
Medal record
Men's badminton
Representing China
Thomas Cup
Gold medal – first place	2024 Chengdu	Men's team
Gold medal – first place	2026 Horsens	Men's team
Asian Championships
Bronze medal – third place	2026 Ningbo	Men’s doubles
Asia Mixed Team Championships
Gold medal – first place	2023 Dubai	Mixed team
Asia Team Championships
Gold medal – first place	2024 Selangor	Men's team
Silver medal – second place	2026 Qingdao	Men's team
World University Games
Gold medal – first place	2021 Chengdu	Men's doubles
Silver medal – second place	2021 Chengdu	Mixed team
World Junior Championships
Gold medal – first place	2015 Lima	Mixed team
Gold medal – first place	2016 Bilbao	Mixed team
Bronze medal – third place	2016 Bilbao	Boys' doubles
Asian Junior Championships
Gold medal – first place	2015 Bangkok	Mixed team
Gold medal – first place	2016 Bangkok	Mixed team
Bronze medal – third place	2015 Bangkok	Boys' doubles
Bronze medal – third place	2016 Bangkok	Boys' doubles

Ren Xiangyu (Chinese: 任翔宇; pinyin: Rén Xiángyǔ; born 23 October 1998) is a Chinese badminton player. Born in Luzhou, Sichuan province, he has shown his talent in badminton since he was a child. He once trained at the Luzhou sports school, and entered the national team in 2016. He helped the junior national team to clinch the mixed team titles at the 2015 and 2016 Asian Junior Championships, and also at the 2015 and 2016 World Junior Championships. He claimed his first senior international title at the 2018 U.S. Open in the men's doubles event partnered with Ou Xuanyi. In 2023, he helped the national team win the Asia Mixed Team Championships, and won the postponed Summer World University Games with Tan Qiang.

== Achievements ==
=== World University Games ===
Men's doubles
Year	Venue	Partner	Opponent	Score	Result	Ref.
2021	Shuangliu Sports Centre Gymnasium; Chengdu, China	(China) Tan Qiang	(China) He Jiting (China) Zhou Haodong	23–21, 21–16	Gold	

=== Asian Championships ===
Men's doubles
Year	Venue	Partner	Opponent	Score	Result
2026	Ningbo Olympic Sports Center Gymnasium, Ningbo, China	(China) He Jiting	(South Korea) Kim Won-ho (South Korea) Seo Seung-jae	14–21, 20–22	Bronze

=== BWF World Junior Championships ===
Boys' doubles
Year	Venue	Partner	Opponent	Score	Result
2016	Bilbao Arena; Bilbao, Spain	(China) Fan Qiuyue	(South Korea) Lee Hong-sub (South Korea) Lim Su-min	21–15, 17–21, 20–22	Bronze

=== Asian Junior Championships ===
Boys' doubles
Year	Venue	Partner	Opponent	Score	Result
2015	CPB Badminton Training Center; Bangkok, Thailand	(China) Tan Qiang	(China) Han Chengkai (China) Zhou Haodong	21–12, 16–21, 18–21	Bronze
2016	CPB Badminton Training Center; Bangkok, Thailand	(China) Fan Qiuyue	(China) He Jiting (China) Tan Qiang	10–21, 16–21	Bronze

=== BWF World Tour (7 titles, 7 runners-up) ===
The BWF World Tour, which was announced on 19 March 2017 and implemented in 2018, is a series of elite badminton tournaments sanctioned by the Badminton World Federation (BWF). The BWF World Tour is divided into levels of World Tour Finals, Super 1000, Super 750, Super 500, Super 300, and the BWF Tour Super 100.

Men's doubles
Year	Tournament	Level	Partner	Opponent	Score	Result
2018	U.S. Open	Super 300	(China) Ou Xuanyi	(South Korea) Kang Min-hyuk (South Korea) Kim Won-ho	16–21, 21–16, 21–17	(gold) Winner
2018	Singapore Open	Super 500	(China) Ou Xuanyi	(Indonesia) Mohammad Ahsan (Indonesia) Hendra Setiawan	13–21, 19–21	(silver) Runner-up
2019	Lingshui China Masters	Super 100	(China) Ou Xuanyi	(Chinese Taipei) Lee Jhe-huei (Chinese Taipei) Yang Po-hsuan	17–21, 16–21	(silver) Runner-up
2022	Vietnam Open	Super 100	(China) Tan Qiang	(China) He Jiting (China) Zhou Haodong	17–21, 21–18, 21–8	(gold) Winner
2023	Swiss Open	Super 300	(China) Tan Qiang	(India) Satwiksairaj Rankireddy (India) Chirag Shetty	19–21, 22–24	(silver) Runner-up
2023	Japan Masters	Super 500	(China) He Jiting	(China) Liu Yuchen (China) Ou Xuanyi	21–14, 15–21, 21–15	(gold) Winner
2024	Thailand Masters	Super 300	(China) He Jiting	(Thailand) Peeratchai Sukphun (Thailand) Pakkapon Teeraratsakul	16–21, 21–14, 21–13	(gold) Winner
2024	German Open	Super 300	(China) He Jiting	(Chinese Taipei) Lee Jhe-huei (Chinese Taipei) Yang Po-hsuan	21–15, 21–23, 21–23	(silver) Runner-up
2024	Singapore Open	Super 750	(China) He Jiting	(Indonesia) Fajar Alfian (Indonesia) Muhammad Rian Ardianto	21–19, 21–14	(gold) Winner
2024	Australian Open	Super 500	(China) He Jiting	(Indonesia) Mohammad Ahsan (Indonesia) Hendra Setiawan	21–11, 21–10	(gold) Winner
2024	China Open	Super 1000	(China) He Jiting	(Malaysia) Goh Sze Fei (Malaysia) Nur Izzuddin	21–13, 12–21, 17–21	(silver) Runner-up
2026	Ruichang China Masters	Super 100	(China) He Jiting	(China) Lin Yifan (China) Yang Jiayi	21–12, 16–21, 23–21	(gold) Winner
2026	China Masters	Super 750	(China) He Jiting	(India) Satwiksairaj Rankireddy (India) Chirag Shetty	21–11, 13–21, 17–21	(silver) Runner-up

Mixed doubles
Year	Tournament	Level	Partner	Opponent	Score	Result
2019	SaarLorLux Open	Super 100	(China) Zhou Chaomin	(China) Guo Xinwa (China) Zhang Shuxian	18–21, 19–21	(silver) Runner-up

=== BWF International Challenge/Series (1 title) ===
Mixed doubles
Year	Tournament	Partner	Opponent	Score	Result
2019	Belarus International	(China) Zhou Chaomin	(China) Guo Xinwa (China) Zhang Shuxian	22–20, 21–19	(gold) Winner
