= 2015 Badminton Asia Junior Championships =

Tournament details
- Dates: 28 June – 5 July 2015
- Edition: 18
- Venue: CPB Badminton and Sports Science Training Center
- Location: Bangkok, Thailand

The 2015 Badminton Asia Junior Championships is an 18th edition of the Asia continental junior championships to crown the best U-19 badminton players across Asia. It was held in Bangkok, Thailand, from June 28 to July 5, 2015.

== Tournament ==
The 2015 Badminton Asia Junior Championships organized by the Badminton Association of Thailand and Badminton Asia Confederation. This tournament consists of mixed team competition, which was held from 28 June – 1 July, as well as the five individual events started from 1–5 July.

=== Venue ===
This tournament was held at CPB Badminton and Sports Science Training Center in Bangkok, Thailand.

== Medalists ==
In the mixed team event, China team clinched the gold medal by ending the final battle against South Korea in only three straight matches. China made a clean sweep after clinch all the individual events titles.

Event	Gold	Silver	Bronze
Teams	China; Lin Guipu; Han Chengkai; He Jiting; Sun Feixiang; Tan Qiang; Ye Binghong; Zheng Siwei; Zhou Haodong; He Bingjiao; An Yu; Chen Qingchen; Chen Xiaoxin; Chen Yufei; Du Yue; Jia Yifan; Li Yinhui	South Korea; Baek Seung-gyu; Choi Jong-woo; Lee Jun-su; Lee Hong-sub; Lim Su-min; Park Kyung-hoon; Seo Seung-jae; Son Seong-hyun; Byun Soo-in; Jang Na-ra; Kim Ga-eun; Kim Hyang-im; Kim Hye-jeong; Park Keun-hye; Seong Na-yeong; Shim Ye-rim	Indonesia; Firman Abdul Kholik; Enzi Shafira; Yantoni Edy Saputra; Muhammad Reza Pahlevi Isfahani; Yahya Adi Kumara; Andika Ramadiansyah; Beno Drajat; Fachriza Abimanyu; Gregoria Mariska Tunjung; Ruselli Hartawan; Nisak Puji Lestari; Rika Rositawati; Jauza Fadhila Sugiarto; Apriani Rahayu; Marsheilla Gischa Islami; Yulfira Barkah
Teams	China; Lin Guipu; Han Chengkai; He Jiting; Sun Feixiang; Tan Qiang; Ye Binghong; Zheng Siwei; Zhou Haodong; He Bingjiao; An Yu; Chen Qingchen; Chen Xiaoxin; Chen Yufei; Du Yue; Jia Yifan; Li Yinhui	South Korea; Baek Seung-gyu; Choi Jong-woo; Lee Jun-su; Lee Hong-sub; Lim Su-min; Park Kyung-hoon; Seo Seung-jae; Son Seong-hyun; Byun Soo-in; Jang Na-ra; Kim Ga-eun; Kim Hyang-im; Kim Hye-jeong; Park Keun-hye; Seong Na-yeong; Shim Ye-rim	Japan; Kenya Mitsuhashi; Shuto Morioka; Keita Ogawa; Yoshitaka Ogura; Masayuki Onodera; Kento Sakai; Koki Watanabe; Yuta Watanabe; Moe Araki; Saena Kawakami; Nami Matsuyama; Natsuki Nidaira; Hikari Saito; Shiori Saito; Chiharu Shida; Natsuki Sone
Boys' singles	(China) Lin Guipu	(South Korea) Seo Seung-jae	(Japan) Yuta Watanabe
Boys' singles	(China) Lin Guipu	(South Korea) Seo Seung-jae	(Chinese Taipei) Lu Chia-hung
Girls' singles	(China) He Bingjiao	(Thailand) Pornpawee Chochuwong	(Malaysia) Goh Jin Wei
Girls' singles	(China) He Bingjiao	(Thailand) Pornpawee Chochuwong	(Japan) Moe Araki
Boys' doubles	(China) He Jiting (China) Zheng Siwei	(China) Han Chengkai (China) Zhou Haodong	(China) Ren Xiangyu (China) Tan Qiang
Boys' doubles	(China) He Jiting (China) Zheng Siwei	(China) Han Chengkai (China) Zhou Haodong	(South Korea) Lee Hong-sub (South Korea) Lim Su-min
Girls' doubles	(China) Du Yue (China) Li Yinhui	(China) Chen Qingchen (China) Jia Yifan	(Japan) Nami Matsuyama (Japan) Chiharu Shida
Girls' doubles	(China) Du Yue (China) Li Yinhui	(China) Chen Qingchen (China) Jia Yifan	(South Korea) Kim Hye-jeong (South Korea) Park Keun-hye
Mixed doubles	(China) Zheng Siwei (China) Chen Qingchen	(South Korea) Choi Jong-woo (South Korea) Kim Hye-jeong	(Indonesia) Fachriza Abimanyu (Indonesia) Apriani Rahayu
Mixed doubles	(China) Zheng Siwei (China) Chen Qingchen	(South Korea) Choi Jong-woo (South Korea) Kim Hye-jeong	(China) He Jiting (China) Du Yue

== Medal table ==
Rank	Nation	Gold	Silver	Bronze	Total
1	China (CHN)	6	2	2	10
2	South Korea (KOR)	0	3	2	5
3	Thailand (THA)	0	1	0	1
4	Japan (JPN)	0	0	4	4
5	Indonesia (INA)	0	0	2	2
6	Chinese Taipei (TPE)	0	0	1	1
6	Malaysia (MAS)	0	0	1	1
Totals (7 entries)		6	6	12	24
