= Tan Qiang =

Chinese badminton player (born 1998)

Tan Qiang 谭强
Personal information
- Born: 16 September 1998 (age 28) Nanjing, China
- Height: 1.75 m (5 ft 9 in)

Sport
- Country: China
- Sport: Badminton
- Handedness: Right
- Retired: 20 August 2024

Men's & mixed doubles
- Highest ranking: 10 (MD with He Jiting, 23 July 2019); 156 (XD, 20 April 2017)
- BWF profile
Medal record
Men's badminton
Representing China
World Championships
Silver medal – second place	2021 Huelva	Men's doubles
Sudirman Cup
Gold medal – first place	2021 Vantaa	Mixed team
Thomas Cup
Silver medal – second place	2020 Aarhus	Men's team
Asia Mixed Team Championships
Gold medal – first place	2019 Hong Kong	Mixed team
Gold medal – first place	2023 Dubai	Mixed team
Asia Team Championships
Silver medal – second place	2018 Alor Setar	Men's team
World University Games
Gold medal – first place	2021 Chengdu	Men's doubles
Silver medal – second place	2021 Chengdu	Mixed team
World Junior Championships
Gold medal – first place	2015 Lima	Mixed team
Gold medal – first place	2016 Bilbao	Mixed team
Asian Junior Championships
Gold medal – first place	2015 Bangkok	Mixed team
Gold medal – first place	2016 Bangkok	Mixed team
Silver medal – second place	2016 Bangkok	Boys' doubles
Bronze medal – third place	2015 Bangkok	Boys' doubles

Tan Qiang (Chinese: 谭强; born 16 September 1998) is a Chinese badminton player. In 2015, he won the bronze medal at the Asian Junior Championships in the boys' doubles event partnered with Ren Xiangyu, and in 2016, won the silver medal partnered with He Jiting. In 2017, he became the runner-up at the China International tournament in the mixed doubles event partnered with Xu Ya. In 2023, he helped the national team win the 2023 Asia Mixed Team Championships, and won the postponed Summer World University Games with Ren Xiangyu.

Tan retired from international badminton on 20 August 2024.

== Achievements ==
=== BWF World Championships ===
Men's doubles
Year	Venue	Partner	Opponent	Score	Result
2021	Palacio de los Deportes Carolina Marín, Huelva, Spain	(China) He Jiting	(Japan) Takuro Hoki (Japan) Yugo Kobayashi	12–21, 18–21	Silver

=== World University Games ===
Men's doubles
Year	Venue	Partner	Opponent	Score	Result	Ref.
2021	Shuangliu Sports Centre Gymnasium; Chengdu, China	(China) Ren Xiangyu	(China) He Jiting (China) Zhou Haodong	23–21, 21–16	Gold	

=== Asian Junior Championships ===
Boys' doubles
Year	Venue	Partner	Opponent	Score	Result
2015	CPB Badminton Training Center; Bangkok, Thailand	(China) Ren Xiangyu	(China) Han Chengkai (China) Zhou Haodong	21–12, 16–21, 18–21	Bronze
2016	CPB Badminton Training Center; Bangkok, Thailand	(China) He Jiting	(China) Han Chengkai (China) Zhou Haodong	12–21, 17–21	Silver

=== BWF World Tour (3 titles, 2 runners-up) ===
The BWF World Tour, which was announced on 19 March 2017 and implemented in 2018, is a series of elite badminton tournaments sanctioned by the Badminton World Federation (BWF). The BWF World Tour is divided into levels of World Tour Finals, Super 1000, Super 750, Super 500, Super 300, and the BWF Tour Super 100.

Men's doubles
Year	Tournament	Level	Partner	Opponent	Score	Result
2018	Fuzhou China Open	Super 750	(China) He Jiting	(Indonesia) Marcus Fernaldi Gideon (Indonesia) Kevin Sanjaya Sukamuljo	27–25, 17–21, 15–21	(silver) Runner-up
2019	Syed Modi International	Super 300	(China) He Jiting	(South Korea) Choi Sol-gyu (South Korea) Seo Seung-jae	21–18, 21–19	(gold) Winner
2022	Vietnam Open	Super 100	(China) Ren Xiangyu	(China) He Jiting (China) Zhou Haodong	17–21, 21–18, 21–8	(gold) Winner
2023	Swiss Open	Super 300	(China) Ren Xiangyu	(India) Satwiksairaj Rankireddy (India) Chirag Shetty	19–21, 22–24	(silver) Runner-up
2024	Ruichang China Masters	Super 100	(China) Zhou Haodong	(Chinese Taipei) Chiang Chien-wei (Chinese Taipei) Wu Hsuan-yi	21–18, 21–15	(gold) Winner

=== BWF International Challenge/Series (1 runner-up) ===
Mixed doubles
Year	Tournament	Partner	Opponent	Score	Result
2017	China International	(China) Xu Ya	(Japan) Tomoya Takashina (Japan) Rie Etoh	7–11, 5–11, 11–13	(silver) Runner-up

BWF International Challenge tournament
BWF International Series tournament
BWF Future Series tournament
