= Han Chengkai =

Chinese badminton player

Han Chengkai 韩呈恺
Personal information
- Born: 29 January 1998 (age 28) Fuzhou, Fujian, China
- Height: 1.83 m (6 ft 0 in)

Sport
- Country: China
- Sport: Badminton
- Handedness: Right
- Retired: 13 September 2021

Men's & mixed doubles
- Highest ranking: 5 (MD with Zhou Haodong 9 April 2019); 102 (XD 19 April 2018)
- BWF profile
Medal record
Men's badminton
Representing China
Sudirman Cup
Gold medal – first place	2019 Nanning	Mixed team
Asia Mixed Team Championships
Gold medal – first place	2019 Hong Kong	Mixed team
Asia Team Championships
Silver medal – second place	2018 Alor Setar	Men's team
World Junior Championships
Gold medal – first place	2015 Lima	Mixed team
Gold medal – first place	2016 Bilbao	Boys' doubles
Gold medal – first place	2016 Bilbao	Mixed team
Bronze medal – third place	2015 Lima	Boys' doubles
Asian Junior Championships
Gold medal – first place	2015 Bangkok	Mixed team
Gold medal – first place	2016 Bangkok	Boys' doubles
Gold medal – first place	2016 Bangkok	Mixed team
Silver medal – second place	2015 Bangkok	Boys' doubles

Han Chengkai (Chinese: 韩呈恺, born 29 January 1998) is a Chinese badminton player. He won the boys' doubles title at the 2016 Asian and World Junior Championships. Han also part of the Chinese team that won the 2019 Tong Yun Kai and Sudirman Cups. Together with his partner Zhou Haodong, he was awarded as the 2018 Most Promising Player of the Year by the BWF. He announced his retirement at the age of 23 after competed at the National Games on 13 September 2021.

== Achievements ==
=== BWF World Junior Championships ===
Boys' doubles
Year	Venue	Partner	Opponent	Score	Result
2015	Centro de Alto Rendimiento de la Videna; Lima, Peru	(China) Zhou Haodong	(Denmark) Joel Eipe (Denmark) Frederik Søgaard	21–18, 17–21, 20–22	Bronze
2016	Bilbao Arena; Bilbao, Spain	(China) Zhou Haodong	(South Korea) Lee Hong-sub (South Korea) Lim Su-min	21–17, 21–14	Gold

=== Asian Junior Championships ===
Boys' doubles
Year	Venue	Partner	Opponent	Score	Result
2015	CPB Badminton Training Center; Bangkok, Thailand	(China) Zhou Haodong	(China) He Jiting (China) Zheng Siwei	19–21, 21–18, 18–21	Silver
2016	CPB Badminton Training Center; Bangkok, Thailand	(China) Zhou Haodong	(China) He Jiting (China) Tan Qiang	21–12, 21–17	Gold

=== BWF World Tour (2 titles, 1 runner-up) ===
The BWF World Tour, which was announced on 19 March 2017 and implemented in 2018, is a series of elite badminton tournaments sanctioned by the Badminton World Federation (BWF). The BWF World Tour is divided into levels of World Tour Finals, Super 1000, Super 750, Super 500, Super 300, and the BWF Tour Super 100.

Men's doubles
Year	Tournament	Level	Partner	Opponent	Score	Result
2018	Lingshui China Masters	Super 100	(China) Zhou Haodong	(China) Di Zijian (China) Wang Chang	19–21, 21–17, 21–16	(gold) Winner
2018	China Open	Super 1000	(China) Zhou Haodong	(Denmark) Kim Astrup (Denmark) Anders Skaarup Rasmussen	13–21, 21–17, 14–21	(silver) Runner-up
2018	French Open	Super 750	(China) Zhou Haodong	(Indonesia) Marcus Fernaldi Gideon (Indonesia) Kevin Sanjaya Sukamuljo	23–21, 8–21, 21–17	(gold) Winner

=== BWF Grand Prix (1 runner-up) ===
The BWF Grand Prix had two levels, the Grand Prix and Grand Prix Gold. It was a series of badminton tournaments sanctioned by the Badminton World Federation (BWF) and played between 2007 and 2017.

Men's doubles
Year	Tournament	Partner	Opponent	Score	Result
2016	Indonesian Masters	(China) Zhou Haodong	(Indonesia) Wahyu Nayaka (Indonesia) Kevin Sanjaya Sukamuljo	16–21, 18–21	(silver) Runner-up

BWF Grand Prix Gold tournament
BWF Grand Prix tournament
