= 2014 BWF World Junior Championships – Boys doubles =

The Boys Doubles tournament of the 2014 BWF World Junior Championships was held on April 13–18. Last year winners Li Junhui and Liu Yuchen could not defend their title due to age eligibility.

Thai pair Kittinupong Ketlen / Dechapol Puavaranukroh won the final against Masahide Nakata / Katsuki Tamate by 21-16, 21-18 and grabbed the title.

== Seeded ==
1. (China) Huang Kaixiang / Zheng Siwei (quarter-final)
2. (South Korea) Choi Jong-woo / Lee Kwang-eon (first round)
3. (Hong Kong) Yonny Chung / Yeung Shing Choi (quarter-final)
4. (Thailand) Kittinupong Ketlen / Dechapol Puavaranukroh (champion)
5. (Russia) Rodion Alimov / Alexandr Kozyrev (second round)
6. (Denmark) Alexander Bond / Joel Eipe (quarter-final)
7. (China) He Jiting / Zhao Jian (third round)
8. (South Korea) Kim Jae-hwan / Kim Jung-ho (semi-final)
9. (Sri Lanka) Sachin Angodavidanalage / Buwenaka Goonathileka (first round)
10. (Indonesia) Muhammad Rian Ardianto / Clinton Hendrik Kudamasa (semi-final)
11. (Indonesia) Althof Baariq / Reinard Dhanriano (third round)
12. (Denmark) Mathias Bay-Smidt / Frederik Sogaard Mortensen (third round)
13. (Vietnam) Do Tuan Duc / Pham Hong Nam (second round)
14. (Netherlands) Ruben Jille / Alex Vlaar (third round)
15. (England) Ben Lane / Sean Vendy (third round)
16. (Japan) Hashiru Shimono / Kanta Tsuneyama (second round)

== Draw ==
=== Finals ===
Quarterfinals
1	(China) Huang Kaixiang (China) Zheng Siwei	21	17	18
5/8	(South Korea) Kim Jae-hwan (South Korea) Kim Jung-ho	15	21	21
3/4	(Thailand) Kittinupong Ketlen (Thailand) Dechapol Puavaranukroh	21	21
(India) Arjun M.R. (India) Chirag Shetty	19	14
9/16	(Indonesia) Muhammad Rian Ardianto (Indonesia) Clinton Hendrik Kudamassa	21	21
3/4	(Hong Kong) Yonny Chung (Hong Kong) Yeung Shing Choi	15	17
5/8	(Denmark) Alexander Bond (Denmark) Joel Eipe	21	8	16
(Japan) Masahide Nakata (Japan) Katsuki Tamate	18	21	21

Semifinals
5/8	(South Korea) Kim Jae-hwan (South Korea) Kim Jung-ho	14	18
3/4	(Thailand) Kittinupong Ketlen (Thailand) Dechapol Puavaranukroh	21	21
9/16	(Indonesia) Muhammad Rian Ardianto (Indonesia) Clinton Hendrik Kudamassa	21	20	18
(Japan) Masahide Nakata (Japan) Katsuki Tamate	15	22	21

Final
3/4	(Thailand) Kittinupong Ketlen (Thailand) Dechapol Puavaranukroh	21	21
(Japan) Masahide Nakata (Japan) Katsuki Tamate	16	18

=== Top Half ===
==== Section 1 ====
First Round
1	(China) Huang KX (China) Zheng SW
BYE
(France) R Gueguin (France) A Hammer	21	21
(Nepal) D Dhami (Nepal) N Shrestha	7	7
9/16	(Indonesia) A Baariq (Indonesia) R Dhanriano	21	28
(Canada) J Ho-Shue (Canada) J Lai	12	26
(Germany) D Peng (Germany) M Weisskirchen	12	18
(Philippines) C Bernardo (Philippines) A Morada	21	21

Second Round
1	(China) Huang KX (China) Zheng SW	21	21
(France) R Gueguin (France) A Hammer	13	11
9/16	(Indonesia) A Baariq (Indonesia) R Dhanriano	21	21
(Philippines) C Bernardo (Philippines) A Morada	19	15

Third Round
1	(China) Huang KX (China) Zheng SW	21	21
9/16	(Indonesia) A Baariq (Indonesia) R Dhanriano	10	17

==== Section 2 ====
First Round
5/8	(South Korea) Kim J-h (South Korea) Kim J-h	21	21
(England) M Clare (England) D King	13	9
(United States) T Lam (United States) J Ma	21	14	21
(Australia) A Joe (Australia) S Leung	14	21	19
9/16	(Netherlands) R Jille (Netherlands) A Vlaar	21	21	21
(Hong Kong) Lee CW (Hong Kong) Li KH	23	16	13
(Singapore) Ngiam B (Singapore) Tan MS	11	9
(Indonesia) I Gunardi (Indonesia) D Haryandika	21	21

Second Round
5/8	(South Korea) Kim J-h (South Korea) Kim J-h	21	21
(United States) T Lam (United States) J Ma	8	7
9/16	(Netherlands) R Jille (Netherlands) A Vlaar	21	14	21
(Indonesia) I Gunardi (Indonesia) D Haryandika	16	21	15

Third Round
5/8	(South Korea) Kim J-h (South Korea) Kim J-h	21	22
9/16	(Netherlands) R Jille (Netherlands) A Vlaar	8	20

==== Section 3 ====
First Round
3/4	(Thailand) K Ketlen (Thailand) D Puavaranukroh	21	21
(Syria) A Al Jalad (Syria) M Aram	15	12
(Slovenia) M Ivanic (Slovenia) A Krapez	12	7
(Thailand) T Arkornnit (Thailand) S Jomkoh	21	21
9/16	(Japan) H Shimono (Japan) K Tsuneyama	21	21
(Botswana) T Olekantse (Botswana) T Perekisi	6	5
(Malaysia) Chua KW (Malaysia) Ng DH	21	21
(Bulgaria) D Nikolov (Bulgaria) V Shishkov	14	14

Second Round
3/4	(Thailand) K Ketlen (Thailand) D Puavaranukroh	20	21	21
(Thailand) T Arkornnit (Thailand) S Jomkoh	22	14	12
9/16	(Japan) H Shimono (Japan) K Tsuneyama	17	16
(Malaysia) Chua KW (Malaysia) Ng DH	21	21

Third Round
3/4	(Thailand) K Ketlen (Thailand) D Puavaranukroh	21	21
(Malaysia) Chua KW (Malaysia) Ng DH	13	16

==== Section 4 ====
First Round
5/8	(Russia) R Alimov (Russia) A Kozyrev	21	21
(South Africa) M Jennings (South Africa) B Von Bodenstein	15	14
(Zambia) C Mulenga (Zambia) C Nakanda	10	7
(India) Arjun M.R. (India) C Shetty	21	21
9/16	(Denmark) M Bay-Smidt (Denmark) F Mortensen	21	21
(Sri Lanka) A Wanniachchigedon (Sri Lanka) B Yatawara	6	11
(Chinese Taipei) Po L-w (Chinese Taipei) Yang M-t	21	21
(Algeria) M Guelmaoui (Algeria) Y Medel	11	7

Second Round
5/8	(Russia) R Alimov (Russia) A Kozyrev	13	5
(India) Arjun M.R. (India) C Shetty	21	21
9/16	(Denmark) M Bay-Smidt (Denmark) F Mortensen	9	21	21
(Chinese Taipei) Po L-w (Chinese Taipei) Yang M-t	21	15	15

Third Round
(India) Arjun M.R. (India) C Shetty	21	13	21
9/16	(Denmark) M Bay-Smidt (Denmark) F Mortensen	15	21	17

=== Bottom Half ===
==== Section 5 ====
First Round
(Philippines) J Deato (Philippines) V Manuel	11	12
(Malaysia) Goh SF (Malaysia) Tan JH	21	21
(Japan) K Mitsuhashi (Japan) Y Watanabe	18	14
9/16	(Indonesia) R Ardianto (Indonesia) C Kudamassa	21	21
(Macau) Iek UI (Macau) Lou HM	15	11
(Thailand) S Suharitdumrong (Thailand) T Viriyangkura	21	21
(Armenia) Z Mnatsakanyan (Armenia) E Nazaretyan	5	6
5/8	(China) He JT (China) Zhao J	21	21

Second Round
(Malaysia) Goh SF (Malaysia) Tan JH	23	12	19
9/16	(Indonesia) R Ardianto (Indonesia) C Kudamassa	21	21	21
(Thailand) S Suharitdumrong (Thailand) T Viriyangkura	14	17
5/8	(China) He JT (China) Zhao J	21	21

Third Round
9/16	(Indonesia) R Ardianto (Indonesia) C Kudamassa	17	21	22
5/8	(China) He JT (China) Zhao J	21	13	20

==== Section 6 ====
First Round
(Canada) A Bauer (Canada) T Lindeman	16	19
(Chinese Taipei) Lo K-h (Chinese Taipei) Tien Y	21	21
(China) Xu LH (China) Yao ZD	21	18	21
9/16	(Sri Lanka) S Angodavidanalage (Sri Lanka) B Goonathileka	9	21	9
(Chinese Taipei) Lee C-h (Chinese Taipei) Wu Y-c	21	21
(India) C Sen (India) S Sharma	15	17
(United States) D Yang (United States) J Yang	13	15
3/4	(Hong Kong) Y Chung (Hong Kong) Yeung SC	21	21

Second Round
(Chinese Taipei) Lo K-h (Chinese Taipei) Tien Y	10	21	13
(China) Xu LH (China) Yao ZD	21	16	21
(Chinese Taipei) Lee C-h (Chinese Taipei) Wu Y-c	21	21	15
3/4	(Hong Kong) Y Chung (Hong Kong) Yeung SC	23	8	21

Third Round
(China) Xu LH (China) Yao ZD	16	21	19
3/4	(Hong Kong) Y Chung (Hong Kong) Yeung SC	21	17	21

==== Section 7 ====
First Round
(Singapore) R Ng (Singapore) B Ong	21	21
(Uzbekistan) A Bakhshullaev (Uzbekistan) A Khodjaev	11	15
(Spain) E Penalver (Spain) J Suarez	15	15
9/16	(Vietnam) Do TD (Vietnam) Pham HN	21	21
(South Korea) Kang H-s (South Korea) Park K-h
(Czech Republic) L Holub (Czech Republic) J Somerlik	wo
(Germany) B Geiss (Germany) D Seifert	9	17
5/8	(Denmark) A Bond (Denmark) J Eipe	21	21

Second Round
(Singapore) R Ng (Singapore) B Ong	21	21	21
9/16	(Vietnam) Do TD (Vietnam) Pham HN	18	23	19
(South Korea) Kang H-s (South Korea) Park K-h	18	23
5/8	(Denmark) A Bond (Denmark) J Eipe	21	25

Third Round
(Singapore) R Ng (Singapore) B Ong	17	12
5/8	(Denmark) A Bond (Denmark) J Eipe	21	21

==== Section 8 ====
First Round
(Malaysia) Ooi ZH (Malaysia) A Zainuddin	21	18	21
(Russia) S Molodov (Russia) V Soloviev	15	21	19
(France) T Citron (France) T Vallez	8	12
9/16	(England) B Lane (England) S Vendy	21	21
(Egypt) A Abdelhakim (Egypt) A El Gamal	14	8
(Australia) D Guda (Australia) Tang HD	21	21
(Japan) M Nakata (Japan) K Tamate	15	21	21
2	(South Korea) Choi J-w (South Korea) Lee K-e	21	13	13

Second Round
(Malaysia) Ooi ZH (Malaysia) A Zainuddin	20	15
9/16	(England) B Lane (England) S Vendy	22	21
(Australia) D Guda (Australia) Tang HD	17	7
(Japan) M Nakata (Japan) K Tamate	21	21

Third Round
9/16	(England) B Lane (England) S Vendy	15	11
(Japan) M Nakata (Japan) K Tamate	21	21
