= 2014 Asian Junior Badminton Championships – Mixed doubles =

Tournament details
- Dates: 19 – 23 February 2014
- Edition: 17
- Venue: Taipei Gymnasium
- Location: Taipei, Taiwan

The Mixed Doubles tournament of the 2014 Asian Junior Badminton Championships was held from February 19–23 in Taipei, Taiwan. The defending champion of the last edition were the South Korean pair Choi Sol-kyu and Chae Yoo-jung. Last year bronze medalist, and standing in the top seeds Huang Kaixiang and Chen Qingchen of China emerge as the champion after beat the second seeded from South Korea Kim Jung-ho and Kong Hee-yong in the finals with the score 21–14, 21–13.

== Seeded ==
1. (China) Huang Kaixiang / Chen Qingchen (champion)
2. (South Korea) Kim Jung-ho / Kong Hee-yong (final)
3. (Thailand) Dechapol Puavaranukroh / Chanisa Teachavorasinskun (third round)
4. (Malaysia) Chua Khek Wei / Peck Yen Wei (second round)
5. (Singapore) Ryan Ng Zin Rei / Elaine Chua Yi Ling (third round)
6. (Japan) Hashiru Shimono / Wakana Nagahara (quarter-final)
7. (Chinese Taipei) Po Li-wei / Chang Ching-hui (third round)
8. (Chinese Taipei) Lee Chia-han / Lee Chia-hsin (quarter-final)

== Draw ==
=== Finals ===
Quarterfinals
1	(China) Huang Kaixiang (China) Chen Qingchen	21	21
8	(Chinese Taipei) Lee Chia-han (Chinese Taipei) Lee Chia-hsin	9	18
(Japan) Kenya Mitsuhashi (Japan) Akane Araki	12	6
(South Korea) Kim Jae-hwan (South Korea) Kim Hye-jeon	21	21
(China) He Jiting (China) Du Yue	16	9
(Indonesia) Muhammad Rian Ardianto (Indonesia) Zakia Ulfa	21	21
6	(Japan) Hashiru Shimono (Japan) Wakana Nagahara	21	14	19
2	(South Korea) Kim Jung-ho (South Korea) Kong Hee-yong	17	21	21

Semifinals
1	(China) Huang Kaixiang (China) Chen Qingchen	21	21
(South Korea) Kim Jae-hwan (South Korea) Kim Hye-jeon	9	19
(Indonesia) Muhammad Rian Ardianto (Indonesia) Zakia Ulfa	17	21	5
2	(South Korea) Kim Jung-ho (South Korea) Kong Hee-yong	21	15	21

Final
1	(China) Huang Kaixiang (China) Chen Qingchen	21	21
2	(South Korea) Kim Jung-ho (South Korea) Kong Hee-yong	14	13

=== Top Half ===
==== Section 1 ====
First Round
1	(China) Huang KX (China) Chen QC
BYE
(Hong Kong) Y Chung (Hong Kong) Ng TY	19	17
(South Korea) Choi J-w (South Korea) Seong S-y	21	21
(India) S Chirag (India) K Garg
BYE
(China) Yao ZD (China) Hu YX	20	13
(Japan) Y Watanabe (Japan) A Higashino	22	21

Second Round
1	(China) Huang KX (China) Chen QC	21	21
(South Korea) Choi J-w (South Korea) Seong S-y	12	15
(India) S Chirag (India) K Garg	8	10
(Japan) Y Watanabe (Japan) A Higashino	21	21

Third Round
1	(China) Huang KX (China) Chen QC	18	21	21
(Japan) Y Watanabe (Japan) A Higashino	21	14	19

==== Section 2 ====
First Round
8	(Chinese Taipei) Lee C-h (Chinese Taipei) Lee C-h
BYE
(Macau) Lou HM (Macau) Wong KI	9	9
(Chinese Taipei) Yang M-t (Chinese Taipei) Chen W-t	21	21
(Chinese Taipei) Lin S-k (Chinese Taipei) Pan T-c	21	21
(Kazakhstan) K Kulmatov (Kazakhstan) A Dzyuba	9	7
(Sri Lanka) A Wanniachchigedon (Sri Lanka) N Hewage	7	9
(Malaysia) Sim GZ (Malaysia) Eng PY	21	21

Second Round
8	(Chinese Taipei) Lee C-h (Chinese Taipei) Lee C-h	21	21
(Chinese Taipei) Yang M-t (Chinese Taipei) Chen W-t	17	13
(Chinese Taipei) Lin S-k (Chinese Taipei) Pan T-c	21	14	21
(Malaysia) Sim GZ (Malaysia) Eng PY	19	21	17

Third Round
8	(Chinese Taipei) Lee C-h (Chinese Taipei) Lee C-h	21	21
(Chinese Taipei) Lin S-k (Chinese Taipei) Pan T-c	9	17

==== Section 3 ====
First Round
3	(Thailand) D Puavaranukroh (Thailand) C Teachavorasinskun
BYE
(Uzbekistan) A Khodjaev (Uzbekistan) A Khurshudyan	13	9
(Philippines) C Bernardo (Philippines) J De Vera	21	21
(Chinese Taipei) Chang H-w (Chinese Taipei) Tsai H-y
BYE
(Japan) K Mitsuhashi (Japan) A Araki	21	21
(Sri Lanka) M Samaranayake (Sri Lanka) Y Dayarathne	12	8

Second Round
3	(Thailand) D Puavaranukroh (Thailand) C Teachavorasinskun	22	21
(Philippines) C Bernardo (Philippines) J De Vera	20	13
(Chinese Taipei) Chang H-w (Chinese Taipei) Tsai H-y	8	19
(Japan) K Mitsuhashi (Japan) A Araki	21	21

Third Round
3	(Thailand) D Puavaranukroh (Thailand) C Teachavorasinskun	16	22	18
(Japan) K Mitsuhashi (Japan) A Araki	21	20	21

==== Section 4 ====
First Round
5	(Singapore) R Ng (Singapore) E Chua
BYE
(Hong Kong) Leung KY (Hong Kong) Chan YK	6	9
(Malaysia) Tan JH (Malaysia) Goh YC	21	21
(Sri Lanka) N De Silva (Sri Lanka) K Arachchige	11	9
(Indonesia) R Nugroho (Indonesia) N Lestari	21	21
(Indonesia) R Dhanriano (Indonesia) R Rositawati	16	14
(South Korea) Kim J-h (South Korea) Kim H-j	21	21

Second Round
5	(Singapore) R Ng (Singapore) E Chua	18	21	21
(Malaysia) Tan JH (Malaysia) Goh YC	21	19	19
(Indonesia) R Nugroho (Indonesia) N Lestari	12	21	14
(South Korea) Kim J-h (South Korea) Kim H-j	21	16	21

Third Round
5	(Singapore) R Ng (Singapore) E Chua	18	11
(South Korea) Kim J-h (South Korea) Kim H-j	21	21

=== Bottom Half ===
==== Section 5 ====
First Round
(Japan) M Nakata (Japan) S Ozaki	21	21	21
(Hong Kong) Yeung SC (Hong Kong) Wu YT	18	23	18
(Philippines) P Monterubio (Philippines) E Inlayo	7	8
(China) He JT (China) Du Y	21	21
(Singapore) Tan MS (Singapore) Ong RN	17	17
(Malaysia) Chen JH (Malaysia) Yap Z	21	21
BYE
7	(Chinese Taipei) Po L-w (Chinese Taipei) Chang C-h

Second Round
(Japan) M Nakata (Japan) S Ozaki	12	12
(China) He JT (China) Du Y	21	21
(Malaysia) Chen JH (Malaysia) Yap Z	18	21	19
7	(Chinese Taipei) Po L-w (Chinese Taipei) Chang C-h	21	17	21

Third Round
(China) He JT (China) Du Y	21	23
7	(Chinese Taipei) Po L-w (Chinese Taipei) Chang C-h	11	21

==== Section 6 ====
First Round
(Indonesia) T Supriadi (Indonesia) A Rahayu	21	21
(Sri Lanka) B Yatawara (Sri Lanka) L Geeganage	8	13
BYE
(Thailand) S Jomkoh (Thailand) C Wongtragool
(Philippines) A Morada (Philippines) A Leonardo	16	18
(Indonesia) R Ardianto (Indonesia) Z Ulfa	21	21
BYE
4	(Malaysia) Chua KW (Malaysia) Peck YW

Second Round
(Indonesia) T Supriadi (Indonesia) A Rahayu	21	14	21
(Thailand) S Jomkoh (Thailand) C Wongtragool	19	21	17
(Indonesia) R Ardianto (Indonesia) Z Ulfa	21	21
4	(Malaysia) Chua KW (Malaysia) Peck YW	11	14

Third Round
(Indonesia) T Supriadi (Indonesia) A Rahayu	13	21	17
(Indonesia) R Ardianto (Indonesia) Z Ulfa	21	11	21

==== Section 7 ====
First Round
(India) B. R. Sankeerth (India) M Mahadevan	7	15
(China) Zhao J (China) Jiang BB	21	21
(Philippines) R Santos (Philippines) L Tercias	15	10
(Hong Kong) Li KH (Hong Kong) Chow KL	21	21
(Singapore) Ngiam B (Singapore) C Wong	21	21
(Uzbekistan) A Bakhshulaev (Uzbekistan) M Pakina	9	13
BYE
6	(Japan) H Shimono (Japan) W Nagahara

Second Round
(China) Zhao J (China) Jiang BB	21	21
(Hong Kong) Li KH (Hong Kong) Chow KL	10	10
(Singapore) Ngiam B (Singapore) C Wong	11	12
6	(Japan) H Shimono (Japan) W Nagahara	21	21

Third Round
(China) Zhao J (China) Jiang BB	16	21	14
6	(Japan) H Shimono (Japan) W Nagahara	21	15	21

==== Section 8 ====
First Round
(Thailand) T Viriyangkura (Thailand) P Chochuwong	14	12
(Chinese Taipei) Wu Y-c (Chinese Taipei) Chang H-t	21	21
BYE
(Singapore) B Ong (Singapore) Yeo JM
(Macau) Tai KH (Macau) Gong XX	8	8
(South Korea) Park K-h (South Korea) Bang J-s	21	21
BYE
2	(South Korea) Kim J-h (South Korea) Kong H-y

Second Round
(Chinese Taipei) Wu Y-c (Chinese Taipei) Chang H-t	16	21	20
(Singapore) B Ong (Singapore) Yeo JM	21	18	22
(South Korea) Park K-h (South Korea) Bang J-s	11	21	16
2	(South Korea) Kim J-h (South Korea) Kong H-y	21	15	21

Third Round
(Singapore) B Ong (Singapore) Yeo JM	14	15
2	(South Korea) Kim J-h (South Korea) Kong H-y	21	21
