= 2014 BWF World Junior Championships – Mixed doubles =

The Mixed Doubles tournament of the 2014 BWF World Junior Championships was held on April 13–18.

Huang Kaixiang and Chen Qingchen from China clinched the title for 2 years in a row after won another final against Indonesian pair, this time Muhammad Rian Ardianto and Rosyita Eka Putri Sari by 21-12 21-17. For Indonesia this was the fourth straight years they were in the final of mixed double.

== Seeded ==
1. (China) Huang Kaixiang / Chen Qingchen (champion)
2. (South Korea) Kim Jung-ho / Kim Hye-jeong (third round)
3. (South Korea) Kim Jae-hwan / Kong Hee-yong (third round)
4. (Thailand) Dechapol Puavaranukroh / Puttita Supajirakul (quarter-final)
5. (China) He Jiting / Du Yue (quarter-final)
6. (England) Ben Lane / Jessica Pugh (third round)
7. (Singapore) Ryan Ng Zin Rei / Elaine Chua Yi Ling (fourth round)
8. (Indonesia) Rafiddias Akhdan Nugroho / Zakia Ulfa (fourth round)
9. (Russia) Rodion Alimov / Alina Davletova (third round)
10. (Denmark) Alexander Bond / Ditte Soby Hansen (third round)
11. (Netherlands) Ruben Jille / Alida Chen (fourth round)
12. (Japan) Kenya Mitsuhashi / Chiharu Shida (third round)
13. (Singapore) Bernard Ong Soon Yang / Yeo Jiamin (fourth round)
14. (Japan) Yuta Watanabe / Arisa Higashino (semi-final)
15. (Chinese Taipei) Wu Yuan-cheng / Chang Ching-hui (third round)
16. (Chinese Taipei) Yang Ming-tse / Pan Tzu-chin (third round)

== Draw ==
=== Finals ===
Quarterfinals
1	(China) Huang Kaixiang (China) Chen Qingchen	21	21
(Hong Kong) Yonny Chung (Hong Kong) Ng Tsz Yau	15	10
(Malaysia) Tan Jinn Hwa (Malaysia) Goh Yea Ching	7	30	14
9/16	(Japan) Yuta Watanabe (Japan) Arisa Higashino	21	28	21
(South Korea) Park Kyung-hoon (South Korea) Park Keun-hye	21	21
3/4	(Thailand) Dechapol Puavaranukroh (Thailand) Puttita Supajirakul	19	18
5/8	(China) He Jiting (China) Du Yue	14	16
(Indonesia) Muhammad Rian Ardianto (Indonesia) Rosyita Eka Putri Sari	21	21

Semifinals
1	(China) Huang Kaixiang (China) Chen Qingchen	21	21
9/16	(Japan) Yuta Watanabe (Japan) Arisa Higashino	19	12
(South Korea) Park Kyung-hoon (South Korea) Park Keun-hye	13	13
(Indonesia) Muhammad Rian Ardianto (Indonesia) Rosyita Eka Putri Sari	21	21

Final
1	(China) Huang Kaixiang (China) Chen Qingchen	21	21
(Indonesia) Muhammad Rian Ardianto (Indonesia) Rosyita Eka Putri Sari	12	17

=== Top Half ===
==== Section 1 ====
First round
(Mongolia) B Bayarbyamba (Mongolia) N Bayarsaikhan	11	8
(United States) D Yang (United States) V Chen	21	21
(Zambia) C Nakanda (Zambia) E Siamupangila	5	5
(France) T Vallez (France) D Delrue	21	21
(Indonesia) R Dhanriano (Indonesia) N Lestari	21	21
(Vietnam) Vo BT (Vietnam) Do TH	16	9

Second round
1	(China) Huang KX (China) Chen QC	21	21
(South Africa) M Jennings (South Africa) J van der Vyver	7	6
(Germany) M Weisskirchen (Germany) E Janssens	21	21
(United States) D Yang (United States) V Chen	13	19
9/16	(Denmark) A Bond (Denmark) D Hansen	21	21
(Botswana) T Olekantse (Botswana) T Kabelo	8	6
(France) T Vallez (France) D Delrue	21	17	9
(Indonesia) R Dhanriano (Indonesia) N Lestari	18	21	21

Third round
1	(China) Huang KX (China) Chen QC	21	22
(Germany) M Weisskirchen (Germany) E Janssens	16	20
9/16	(Denmark) A Bond (Denmark) D Hansen	21	17	13
(Indonesia) R Dhanriano (Indonesia) N Lestari	11	21	21

Fourth round
1	(China) Huang KX (China) Chen QC	21	21
(Indonesia) R Dhanriano (Indonesia) N Lestari	11	12

==== Section 2 ====
First round
(Macau) J Lo (Macau) Kuan CL	8	18
(Singapore) Tan MS (Singapore) Ong RN	21	21
(Australia) S Leung (Australia) A Wu	12	18
(China) Zhao J (China) Jiang BB	21	21
(Hong Kong) Y Chung (Hong Kong) Ng TY	21	21
(Slovenia) A Krapez (Slovenia) L Salehar	15	17
(Sri Lanka) M Gunatilleke (Sri Lanka) B Galagamage	17	21	21
(Canada) A Fung (Canada) V Cheung	21	18	14

Second round
5/8	(England) B Lane (England) J Pugh	19	21	22
(Philippines) C Bernardo (Philippines) J De Vera	21	14	20
(Singapore) Tan MS (Singapore) Ong RN	13	6
(China) Zhao J (China) Jiang BB	21	21
9/16	(Chinese Taipei) Yang M-t (Chinese Taipei) Pan T-c	21	21
(Russia) D Riabov (Russia) V Chigintseva	14	12
(Hong Kong) Y Chung (Hong Kong) Ng TY	21	21
(Sri Lanka) M Gunatilleke (Sri Lanka) B Galagamage	4	9

Third round
5/8	(England) B Lane (England) J Pugh	21	18	13
(China) Zhao J (China) Jiang BB	13	21	21
9/16	(Chinese Taipei) Yang M-t (Chinese Taipei) Pan T-c	10	18
(Hong Kong) Y Chung (Hong Kong) Ng TY	21	21

Fourth round
(China) Zhao J (China) Jiang BB	21	6	12
(Hong Kong) Y Chung (Hong Kong) Ng TY	15	21	21

==== Section 3 ====
First round
(Czech Republic) L Holub (Czech Republic) M Lajdova	wo
(Thailand) T Viriyangkura (Thailand) P Chochuwong
(India) C Sen (India) K Garg	21	21
(England) D King (England) J Hopton	12	19
(Canada) A Ng (Canada) A Wu	17	18
(Indonesia) G Kamahamas (Indonesia) M Islami	21	21
(Malaysia) Tan JH (Malaysia) Goh YC	21	21
(Philippines) J Deato (Philippines) A Leonardo	10	4

Second round
3/4	(South Korea) Kim J-h (South Korea) Kong H-y	21	21
(Serbia) D Petrovic (Croatia) M Pavlinic	9	10
(Thailand) T Viriyangkura (Thailand) P Chochuwong	21	21
(India) C Sen (India) K Garg	12	8
9/16	(Japan) K Mitsuhashi (Japan) C Shida	21	21
(Slovenia) Z Laznik (Slovenia) K Beton	8	11
(Indonesia) G Kamahamas (Indonesia) M Islami	16	21
(Malaysia) Tan JH (Malaysia) Goh YC	21	23

Third round
3/4	(South Korea) Kim J-h (South Korea) Kong H-y	14	21	18
(Thailand) T Viriyangkura (Thailand) P Chochuwong	21	15	21
9/16	(Japan) K Mitsuhashi (Japan) C Shida	21	15	12
(Malaysia) Tan JH (Malaysia) Goh YC	14	21	21

Fourth round
(Thailand) T Viriyangkura (Thailand) P Chochuwong	18	22	19
(Malaysia) Tan JH (Malaysia) Goh YC	21	20	21

==== Section 4 ====
First round
(Russia) V Soloviev (Russia) M Dmitrieva	16	20
(Chinese Taipei) Po L-w (Chinese Taipei) Tsai H-y	21	22
(Armenia) E Nazaretyan (Armenia) L Poghosyan	18	13
(Spain) J Suarez (Spain) S Penalver	21	21
(Egypt) A El Gamal (Egypt) N Mohamed	9	15
(Netherlands) A Vlaar (Netherlands) I van der Aar	21	21
(Hong Kong) Li KH (Hong Kong) Huang WY	21	21
(Syria) A Al Jalad (Syria) M Al Jalad	7	11

Second round
5/8	(Singapore) R Ng (Singapore) E Chua	21	21
(Germany) D Seifert (Germany) L Heim	16	17
(Chinese Taipei) Po L-w (Chinese Taipei) Tsai H-y	21	21
(Spain) J Suarez (Spain) S Penalver	18	10
9/16	(Japan) Y Watanabe (Japan) A Higashino	21	21
(Uzbekistan) A Khodjaev (Uzbekistan) A Khurshudyan	5	5
(Netherlands) A Vlaar (Netherlands) I van der Aar	19	21	21
(Hong Kong) Li KH (Hong Kong) Huang WY	21	18	19

Third round
5/8	(Singapore) R Ng (Singapore) E Chua	21	20	21
(Chinese Taipei) Po L-w (Chinese Taipei) Tsai H-y	10	22	12
9/16	(Japan) Y Watanabe (Japan) A Higashino	21	21
(Netherlands) A Vlaar (Netherlands) I van der Aar	5	14

Fourth round
5/8	(Singapore) R Ng (Singapore) E Chua	17	11
9/16	(Japan) Y Watanabe (Japan) A Higashino	21	21

=== Bottom Half ===
==== Section 5 ====
First round
(South Korea) Park K-h (South Korea) Park K-h	21	21
(Australia) A Joe (Australia) J Lai	10	12
(United States) A Cheng (United States) S Wong	25	22
(Bulgaria) D Yanakiev (Bulgaria) M Delcheva	23	20
(India) B Sankeerth (India) M Mahadevan	21	18	21
(Czech Republic) J Somerlik (Czech Republic) M Svetnickova	12	21	14
(Malaysia) Ooi ZH (Malaysia) Yap Z	21	21
(Sri Lanka) P Ambegoda (Sri Lanka) Y Dayarathne	18	15

Second round
(South Korea) Park K-h (South Korea) Park K-h	21	21
(United States) A Cheng (United States) S Wong	13	8
(Zambia) C Mulenga (Zambia) M Chilambe	11	8
9/16	(Chinese Taipei) Wu Y-c (Chinese Taipei) Chang C-h	21	21
(India) B Sankeerth (India) M Mahadevan	10	5
(Malaysia) Ooi ZH (Malaysia) Yap Z	21	21
(South Africa) R Snyman (South Africa) J Scholtz	8	8
5/8	(Indonesia) R Nugroho (Indonesia) Z Ulfa	21	21

Third round
(South Korea) Park K-h (South Korea) Park K-h	21	21
9/16	(Chinese Taipei) Wu Y-c (Chinese Taipei) Chang C-h	14	17
(Malaysia) Ooi ZH (Malaysia) Yap Z	18	11
5/8	(Indonesia) R Nugroho (Indonesia) Z Ulfa	21	21

Fourth round
(South Korea) Park K-h (South Korea) Park K-h	24	21
5/8	(Indonesia) R Nugroho (Indonesia) Z Ulfa	22	16

==== Section 6 ====
First round
(South Korea) Choi J-w (South Korea) Kim H-i	21	17	21
(France) A Hammer (France) Y Hoyaux	11	21	14
(Uzbekistan) A Bakhshullaev (Uzbekistan) M Pakina	4	8
(Philippines) A Morada (Philippines) J Francisco	21	21
(England) M Clare (England) I Banerjee	21	21
(Botswana) T Perekisi (Botswana) T Banewang	6	7
(Vietnam) Do TD (Vietnam) Nguyen TL	22	21
(France) R Gueguin (France) L Courtois	20	17

Second round
(South Korea) Choi J-w (South Korea) Kim H-i	21	21
(Philippines) A Morada (Philippines) J Francisco	14	19
(Germany) B Geiss (Germany) Y Li	21	12	14
9/16	(Singapore) B Ong (Singapore) Yeo JM	18	21	21
(England) M Clare (England) I Banerjee	20	22
(Vietnam) Do TD (Vietnam) Nguyen TL	22	24
(Malaysia) Sim GZ (Malaysia) Eng PY	15	12
3/4	(Thailand) D Puavaranukroh (Thailand) P Supajirakul	21	21

Third round
(South Korea) Choi J-w (South Korea) Kim H-i	10	9
9/16	(Singapore) B Ong (Singapore) Yeo JM	21	21
(Vietnam) Do TD (Vietnam) Nguyen TL	9	12
3/4	(Thailand) D Puavaranukroh (Thailand) P Supajirakul	21	21

Fourth round
9/16	(Singapore) B Ong (Singapore) Yeo JM	21	17
3/4	(Thailand) D Puavaranukroh (Thailand) P Supajirakul	23	21

==== Section 7 ====
First round
(Macau) Lou HM (Macau) Wong KI	8	11
(Japan) K Tamate (Japan) S Ozaki	21	21
(Sri Lanka) R De Silva (Sri Lanka) T Ratnayaka	9	6
(Denmark) F Mortensen (Denmark) S Lundgaard	21	21
(South Africa) B Von Bodenstein (South Africa) A Schoonees	8	12
(Japan) M Koga (Japan) W Nagahara	21	21
(China) Yao ZD (China) Hu YX	13	20
(Chinese Taipei) Lee C-h (Chinese Taipei) Lee C-h	21	21

Second round
(Japan) K Tamate (Japan) S Ozaki	16	21	21
(Denmark) F Mortensen (Denmark) S Lundgaard	21	13	12
(Denmark) M Bay-Smidt (Denmark) M Steffensen	21	14	13
9/16	(Netherlands) R Jille (Netherlands) A Chen	10	21	21
(Japan) M Koga (Japan) W Nagahara	22	21
(Chinese Taipei) Lee C-h (Chinese Taipei) Lee C-h	20	15
(United States) K La (United States) J Jin	6	6
5/8	(China) He JT (China) Du Y	21	21

Third round
(Japan) K Tamate (Japan) S Ozaki	19	21	23
9/16	(Netherlands) R Jille (Netherlands) A Chen	21	10	25
(Japan) M Koga (Japan) W Nagahara	12	19
5/8	(China) He JT (China) Du Y	21	21

Fourth round
9/16	(Netherlands) R Jille (Netherlands) A Chen	16	21	10
5/8	(China) He JT (China) Du Y	21	17	21

==== Section 8 ====
First round
(Australia) D Guda (Australia) Khoo LY	16	13
(Hong Kong) Yeung SC (Hong Kong) Wu YT	21	21
(Malaysia) Goh SF (Malaysia) Peck YW	21	21
(Canada) T Lindeman (Canada) T Wang	11	12
(Slovenia) M Ivanic (Slovenia) E Cizelj	21	21
(Armenia) Z Mnatsakanyan (Armenia) K Margaryan	12	14

Second round
(Hong Kong) Yeung SC (Hong Kong) Wu YT	21	21
(Malaysia) Goh SF (Malaysia) Peck YW	13	18
(Egypt) A Abdelhakim (Egypt) H Doha	8	10
9/16	(Russia) R Alimov (Russia) A Davletova	21	21
(Slovenia) M Ivanic (Slovenia) E Cizelj	10	10
(Indonesia) R Ardianto (Indonesia) R Putri Sari	21	21
(Turkey) M Kurt (Turkey) A Demirbag	13	9
2	(South Korea) Kim J-h (South Korea) Kim H-j	21	21

Third round
(Hong Kong) Yeung SC (Hong Kong) Wu YT	21	18	21
9/16	(Russia) R Alimov (Russia) A Davletova	9	21	14
(Indonesia) R Ardianto (Indonesia) R Putri Sari	22	21	21
2	(South Korea) Kim J-h (South Korea) Kim H-j	24	14	15

Fourth round
(Hong Kong) Yeung SC (Hong Kong) Wu YT	18	14
(Indonesia) R Ardianto (Indonesia) R Putri Sari	21	21
