= 2016 Chinese Taipei Masters =

2016 Chinese Taipei Masters Grand Prix
Tournament details
- Dates: 11 – 16 October 2016
- Level: Grand Prix
- Total prize money: US$55,000
- Venue: Xinzhuang Gymnasium
- Location: New Taipei City, Taiwan

Champions
- Men's singles: (India) Sourabh Verma
- Women's singles: (Japan) Ayumi Mine
- Men's doubles: (Indonesia) Fajar Alfian (Indonesia) M. Rian Ardianto
- Women's doubles: (Japan) Yuki Fukushima (Japan) Sayaka Hirota
- Mixed doubles: (Hong Kong) Tang Chun Man (Hong Kong) Tse Ying Suet

The 2016 Chinese Taipei Masters Grand Prix was the 16th grand prix's badminton tournament of the 2016 BWF Grand Prix Gold and Grand Prix. The tournament was held at the Xinzhuang Gymnasium in New Taipei City, Taiwan on October 11–16, 2016 and had a total prize of US$55,000.

== Men's singles ==
=== Seeds ===
1. (Chinese Taipei) Hsu Jen-hao (semifinals)
2. (India) Sameer Verma (second round)
3. (Japan) Kanta Tsuneyama (third round)
4. (South Africa) Jacob Maliekal (second round)
5. (Chinese Taipei) Lin Yu-hsien (semifinals)
6. (Indonesia) Firman Abdul Kholik (second round)
7. (Japan) Hashiru Shimono (second round)
8. (Indonesia) Muhammad Bayu Pangisthu (second round)

=== Finals ===
Quarterfinals
1	(Chinese Taipei) Hsu Jen-hao	6	11	13	11	11
(Malaysia) Tan Chun Seang	11	4	15	5	9
(Japan) Kento Horiuchi	11	1	3	7
(India) Sourabh Varma	7	11	11	11
5	(Chinese Taipei) Lin Yu-hsien	11	6	11	11
(Chinese Taipei) Hsueh Hsuan-yi	6	11	6	6
(Malaysia) Liew Daren	11	11	11
(Indonesia) Shesar Hiren Rhustavito	8	3	2

Semifinals
1	(Chinese Taipei) Hsu Jen-hao	4	7	9
(India) Sourabh Varma	11	11	11
5	(Chinese Taipei) Lin Yu-hsien	9	11	3	10
(Malaysia) Liew Daren	11	6	11	12

Final
(India) Sourabh Varma	12	12	3
(Malaysia) Liew Daren	10	10	3^{r}

=== Top half ===
==== Section 1 ====
First Round
1	(Chinese Taipei) Hsu J-h
BYE
(England) V Wong	6	7	7
(Hong Kong) Lee C Y	11	11	11
(Chinese Taipei) Kuo C-h
BYE
(Chinese Taipei) Teng S-h	11	11	11
(Indonesia) Y F Mainaky	4	1	2

Second Round
1	(Chinese Taipei) Hsu J-h	9	11	11	11
(Hong Kong) Lee C Y	11	7	8	8
(Chinese Taipei) Kuo C-h	8	7	11	9
(Chinese Taipei) Teng S-h	11	11	2	11

Third Round
1	(Chinese Taipei) Hsu J-h	11	11	11
(Chinese Taipei) Teng S-h	9	9	6

==== Section 2 ====
First Round
8	(Indonesia) M B Pangisthu
BYE
(Malaysia) Tan C S	9	11	11	5	11
(Thailand) K Wangcharoen	11	8	4	11	7
(Chinese Taipei) Liu W-c
BYE
(India) S Jaiswal	7	14	11	2
(Chinese Taipei) Shih K-c	11	15	4	11

Second Round
8	(Indonesia) M B Pangisthu	5	4	9
(Malaysia) Tan C S	11	11	11
(Chinese Taipei) Liu W-c	8	8	11	11	6
(Chinese Taipei) Shih K-c	11	11	9	8	11

Third Round
(Malaysia) Tan C S	9	11	11	11
(Chinese Taipei) Shih K-c	11	6	6	9

==== Section 3 ====
First Round
4	(South Africa) J Maliekal
BYE
(Brunei) Jaspar Yu	11	5	5	9
(Japan) K Naraoka	7	11	11	11
(Japan) N Matsukawa
BYE
(Indonesia) N E Sulistyo	6	3	5
(Japan) K Horiuchi	11	11	11

Second Round
4	(South Africa) J Maliekal	11	11	5	7
(Japan) K Naraoka	7	13	11	11
(Japan) N Matsukawa	11	8	8	6
(Japan) K Horiuchi	7	11	11	11

Third Round
(Japan) K Naraoka	10	8	11	6
(Japan) K Horiuchi	12	11	9	11

==== Section 4 ====
First Round
7	(Japan) H Shimono
BYE
(India) S Varma	12	11	11
(Chinese Taipei) Yang Y-h	10	3	5
(Japan) R Maruo
BYE
(Indonesia) W Y Prasetyo	13	6	4	8
(Japan) Y Onodera	11	11	11	11

Second Round
7	(Japan) H Shimono	6	11	10	3
(India) S Varma	11	8	12	11
(Japan) R Maruo	5	11	11	7	11
(Japan) Y Onodera	11	9	7	11	9

Third Round
(India) S Varma	11	11	11
(Japan) R Maruo	6	8	6

=== Bottom half ===
==== Section 5 ====
First Round
(Thailand) S Avihingsanon	10	11	11	11
(Chinese Taipei) Lin C-h	12	8	6	8
BYE
(Japan) K Watanabe
(Chinese Taipei) Hsu J-t	11	9	11	9	11
(Hong Kong) Lee C W	8	11	6	11	8
BYE
5	(Chinese Taipei) Lin Y-h

Second Round
(Thailand) S Avihingsanon	6	11	14	11
(Japan) K Watanabe	11	9	12	4
(Chinese Taipei) Hsu J-t	10	9	13
5	(Chinese Taipei) Lin Y-h	12	11	15

Third Round
(Thailand) S Avihingsanon	11	8	13	2
5	(Chinese Taipei) Lin Y-h	9	11	15	11

==== Section 6 ====
First Round
(Thailand) K Leelavechabutr	8	6	5
(Chinese Taipei) Hsueh H-y	11	11	11
BYE
(Indonesia) H Kho Wibowo
(India) R Y Chittaboina	2^{r}
(Chinese Taipei) Yang C-c	6
BYE
3	(Japan) K Tsuneyama

Second Round
(Chinese Taipei) Hsueh H-y	11	11	14
(Indonesia) H Kho Wibowo	8	7	12
(Chinese Taipei) Yang C-c	8	9	5
3	(Japan) K Tsuneyama	11	11	11

Third Round
(Chinese Taipei) Hsueh H-y	11	11	11	8	11
3	(Japan) K Tsuneyama	8	13	5	11	4

==== Section 7 ====
First Round
(Indonesia) A Marteen	11	11	11
(Chinese Taipei) Yang C-h	7	9	1
BYE
(Thailand) A Namkul
(Malaysia) Liew D	1	11	10	12	11
(Chinese Taipei) Lee C-h	11	6	12	10	9
BYE
6	(Indonesia) F A Kholik

Second Round
(Indonesia) A Marteen	8	8	10
(Thailand) A Namkul	11	11	12
(Malaysia) Liew D	11	4	11	8	11
6	(Indonesia) F A Kholik	6	11	7	11	6

Third Round
(Thailand) A Namkul	9	11	9	7
(Malaysia) Liew D	11	9	11	11

==== Section 8 ====
First Round
(Indonesia) S H Rhustavito	11	11	11
(Chinese Taipei) Chu H-c	8	7	4
BYE
(Chinese Taipei) Lo C-y
(Chinese Taipei) Lu C-h	11	11	11	7	11
(Indonesia) K A Nugraha	4	8	13	11	4
BYE
2	(India) S Verma

Second Round
(Indonesia) S H Rhustavito	11	11	11
(Chinese Taipei) Lo C-y	1	3	7
(Chinese Taipei) Lu C-h	12	6	11	11
2	(India) S Verma	10	11	3	4

Third Round
(Indonesia) S H Rhustavito	11	11	14
(Chinese Taipei) Lu C-h	7	8	12

== Women's singles ==
=== Seeds ===
1. (Chinese Taipei) Pai Yu-po (first round)
2. (Malaysia) Tee Jing Yi (quarterfinals)
3. (Japan) Ayumi Mine (champion)
4. (Malaysia) Goh Jin Wei (first round)
5. (Thailand) Pornpawee Chochuwong (semifinals)
6. (Indonesia) Hana Ramadhini (quarterfinals)
7. (Indonesia) Fitriani (first round)
8. (Indonesia) Dinar Dyah Ayustine (second round)

=== Finals ===
Semifinals
Q3	(Japan) Asuka Takahashi	7	8	8
(Japan) Saena Kawakami	11	11	11
3	(Japan) Ayumi Mine	11	11	11
5	(Thailand) Pornpawee Chochuwong	8	4	5

Final
(Japan) Saena Kawakami	10	11	9	10
3	(Japan) Ayumi Mine	12	7	11	12

=== Top half ===
==== Section 1 ====
First Round
1	(Chinese Taipei) Pai Y-p	2^{r}
(Japan) M Araki	4
(Japan) Y Nakai	11	11	11
(Malaysia) Sonia Cheah S Y	7	6	8
8	(Indonesia) D D Ayustine	13	11	11	11
(Singapore) Grace Chua H Z	15	6	5	8
Q3	(Japan) A Takahashi	14	11	8	9	11
(Chinese Taipei) Chen S-y	12	4	11	11	9

Second Round
(Japan) M Araki	9	4	11	11	9
(Japan) Y Nakai	11	11	8	9	11
8	(Indonesia) D D Ayustine	11	4	11	4	8
Q3	(Japan) A Takahashi	8	11	6	11	11

Quarterfinals
(Japan) Y Nakai	8	11	9
Q3	(Japan) A Takahashi	11	13	11

==== Section 2 ====
First Round
4	(Malaysia) Goh J W	7	8	4
(Japan) S Kawakami	11	11	11
(Chinese Taipei) Chen H-h	2	6	12
(Indonesia) L A Mainaky	11	11	14
6	(Indonesia) H Ramadhini	13	11	11
(Chinese Taipei) Hu L-f	11	5	4
(Hong Kong) Tsang W C	9	6	6
(Indonesia) R Hartawan	11	11	11

Second Round
(Japan) S Kawakami	11	11	12
(Indonesia) L A Mainaky	6	2	10
6	(Indonesia) H Ramadhini	11	11	11
(Indonesia) R Hartawan	9	4	8

Quarterfinals
(Japan) S Kawakami	11	7	11	8	14
6	(Indonesia) H Ramadhini	5	11	9	11	12

=== Bottom half ===
==== Section 3 ====
First Round
Q1	(Chinese Taipei) Liang T-y	8	2	8
(Chinese Taipei) Lee C-h	11	11	11
(Malaysia) Ho Y M	11	15	6	11
7	(Indonesia) Fitriani	9	13	11	6
PFQ	(Chinese Taipei) Lai I-t	8	7	8
(Chinese Taipei) Yu C-h	11	11	11
(Australia) Chen H-y	2	6	5
3	(Japan) A Mine	11	11	11

Second Round
(Chinese Taipei) Lee C-h	11	8	11	11
(Malaysia) Ho Y M	7	11	6	8
(Chinese Taipei) Yu C-h	3	6	8
3	(Japan) A Mine	11	11	11

Quarterfinals
(Chinese Taipei) Lee C-h	9	8	9
3	(Japan) A Mine	11	11	11

==== Section 4 ====
First Round
(Hong Kong) Cheung Y M	11	11	11
Q2	(Chinese Taipei) Chen S-y	2	8	6
(Japan) N Nidaira	9	12	12
5	(Thailand) P Chochuwong	11	14	14
(Chinese Taipei) Sung S-y	11	10	9
(Singapore) Yeo J M	13	12	11
Q4	(Chinese Taipei) Lin H-t	11	13	7	11	5
2	(Malaysia) Tee J Y	9	15	11	9	11

Second Round
(Hong Kong) Cheung Y M	7	11	6
5	(Thailand) P Chochuwong	11	13	11
(Singapore) Yeo J M	9	14	3
2	(Malaysia) Tee J Y	11	15	11

Quarterfinals
5	(Thailand) P Chochuwong	11	11	11
2	(Malaysia) Tee J Y	6	7	6

== Men's doubles ==
=== Seeds ===
1. (Chinese Taipei) Chen Hung-ling / Wang Chi-lin (final)
2. (Hong Kong) Or Chin Chung / Tang Chun Man (first round)
3. (Chinese Taipei) Liao Min-chun / Tseng Min-hao (second round)
4. (Indonesia) Hardianto / Kenas Adi Haryanto (second round)
5. (Japan) Hiroyuki Saeki / Ryota Taohata (semifinals)
6. (Chinese Taipei) Lin Chia-yu / Wu Hsiao-lin (first round)
7. (Malaysia) Lim Khim Wah / Ong Jian Guo (first round)
8. (Malaysia) Nur Mohd Azriyn Ayub / Jagdish Singh (second round)

=== Finals ===
Semifinals
1	(Chinese Taipei) Chen Hung-ling (Chinese Taipei) Wang Chi-lin	11	11	9	8	11
5	(Japan) Hiroyuki Saeki (Japan) Ryota Taohata	6	9	11	11	5
(Indonesia) Fajar Alfian (Indonesia) Muhammad Rian Ardianto	6	6	11	11	11
(Singapore) Terry Hee Yong Kai (Singapore) Loh Kean Hean	11	11	5	5	8

Final
1	(Chinese Taipei) Chen Hung-ling (Chinese Taipei) Wang Chi-lin	6	6	13	11	10
(Indonesia) Fajar Alfian (Indonesia) Muhammad Rian Ardianto	11	11	11	9	12

=== Top half ===
==== Section 1 ====
First Round
1	(Chinese Taipei) Chen H-l (Chinese Taipei) Wang C-l	11	11	13
(Hong Kong) Ho W L (Hong Kong) Tam C H	9	9	11
(Chinese Taipei) Lin S-k (Chinese Taipei) Lu C-y	11	11	11
(Japan) Y Tsukamoto (Japan) S Yamamura	9	6	7
8	(Malaysia) N M A Ayub (Malaysia) J Singh	15	11	5	10	11
(Thailand) T Potieng (Thailand) N Yordphaisong	13	9	11	12	9
(Chinese Taipei) Liu W-c (Chinese Taipei) Yang P-h	11	10	8	10
(Singapore) D B Chrisnanta (Singapore) H Wijaya	7	12	11	12

Second Round
1	(Chinese Taipei) Chen H-l (Chinese Taipei) Wang C-l	11	7	11	11
(Chinese Taipei) Lin S-k (Chinese Taipei) Lu C-y	7	11	6	4
8	(Malaysia) N M A Ayub (Malaysia) J Singh	5	9	3
(Singapore) D B Chrisnanta (Singapore) H Wijaya	11	11	11

Quarterfinals
1	(Chinese Taipei) Chen H-l (Chinese Taipei) Wang C-l	11	11	12
(Singapore) D B Chrisnanta (Singapore) H Wijaya	3	6	10

==== Section 2 ====
First Round
4	(Indonesia) Hardianto (Indonesia) K A Haryanto	12	15	6	11	11
(Malaysia) Chooi K M (Malaysia) Low J S	14	13	11	5	7
Q4	(Chinese Taipei) Shang T-y (Chinese Taipei) Wang C-h	11	5	4	4
PFQ	(Hong Kong) Mak H C (Hong Kong) Yeung S C	5	11	11	11
5	(Japan) H Saeki (Japan) R Taohata	12	11	11
(Chinese Taipei) Lee C-h (Chinese Taipei) Wu Y-c	10	9	8
Q2	(Hong Kong) Chang T C (Hong Kong) Li K H	4	7	11	9
(Chinese Taipei) Chang K-c (Chinese Taipei) Liang J-w	11	11	5	11

Second Round
4	(Indonesia) Hardianto (Indonesia) K A Haryanto	11	5	11	6	3
PFQ	(Hong Kong) Mak H C (Hong Kong) Yeung S C	7	11	4	11	11
5	(Japan) H Saeki (Japan) R Taohata	11	11	11
(Chinese Taipei) Chang K-c (Chinese Taipei) Liang J-w	2	7	4

Quarterfinals
PFQ	(Hong Kong) Mak H C (Hong Kong) Yeung S C	9	7	2
5	(Japan) H Saeki (Japan) R Taohata	11	11	11

=== Bottom half ===
==== Section 3 ====
First Round
(Chinese Taipei) Po L-w (Chinese Taipei) Yang M-t	11	11	11
PFQ	(Chinese Taipei) Liu W-c (Chinese Taipei) Lu C-h	9	9	9
(Japan) T Shimada (Japan) Y Takeuchi	11	8	11	11
7	(Malaysia) Lim K W (Malaysia) Ong J G	7	11	8	8
(Thailand) T Isriyanet (Thailand) K Namdash	8	7	10
(Indonesia) F Alfian (Indonesia) M R Ardianto	11	11	12
(Malaysia) Tan C T (Malaysia) Tan W G	9	9	9
3	(Chinese Taipei) Liao M-c (Chinese Taipei) Tseng M-h	11	11	11

Second Round
(Chinese Taipei) Po L-w (Chinese Taipei) Yang M-t	11	11	10	6
(Japan) T Shimada (Japan) Y Takeuchi	13	9	12	11
(Indonesia) F Alfian (Indonesia) M R Ardianto	11	11	11
3	(Chinese Taipei) Liao M-c (Chinese Taipei) Tseng M-h	8	8	6

Quarterfinals
(Japan) T Shimada (Japan) Y Takeuchi	11	11	6	7	5
(Indonesia) F Alfian (Indonesia) M R Ardianto	5	9	11	11	11

==== Section 4 ====
First Round
Q1	BYE
(Chinese Taipei) Liao K-h (Chinese Taipei) Lu C-p
Q3	(Chinese Taipei) Ou J (Chinese Taipei) Yang P-h	3
6	(Chinese Taipei) Lin C-y (Chinese Taipei) Wu H-l	1^{r}
PFQ	(Chinese Taipei) Lin S-c (Chinese Taipei) Lu C	11	11	5	8
(Singapore) Terry Hee Y K (Singapore) Loh H K	9	13	11	11
(Chinese Taipei) Hung Y-y (Chinese Taipei) Lin C-h	9	7	11	11	11
2	(Hong Kong) Or C C (Hong Kong) Tang C M	11	11	5	9	9

Second Round
(Chinese Taipei) Liao K-h (Chinese Taipei) Lu C-p	11	15	9	11
Q3	(Chinese Taipei) Ou J (Chinese Taipei) Yang P-h	5	13	11	8
(Singapore) Terry Hee Y K (Singapore) Loh H K	11	11	11
(Chinese Taipei) Hung Y-y (Chinese Taipei) Lin C-h	5	9	5

Quarterfinals
(Chinese Taipei) Liao K-h (Chinese Taipei) Lu C-p	8	11	11	9	6
(Singapore) Terry Hee Y K (Singapore) Loh H K	11	3	9	11	11

== Women's doubles ==
=== Seeds ===
1. (Japan) Yuki Fukushima / Sayaka Hirota (champion)
2. (Hong Kong) Poon Lok Yan / Tse Ying Suet (quarterfinals)
3. (Thailand) Chayanit Chaladchalam / Phataimas Muenwong (second round)
4. (Japan) Shiho Tanaka / Koharu Yonemoto (final)

=== Finals ===
Semifinals
1	(Japan) Yuki Fukushima (Japan) Sayaka Hirota	11	11	11
(Malaysia) Chow Mei Kuan (Malaysia) Lee Meng Yean	7	7	3
4	(Japan) Shiho Tanaka (Japan) Koharu Yonemoto	11	11	11
(Malaysia) Lim Yin Loo (Malaysia) Yap Cheng Wen	8	9	6

Final
1	(Japan) Yuki Fukushima (Japan) Sayaka Hirota	12	11	11
4	(Japan) Shiho Tanaka (Japan) Koharu Yonemoto	10	5	7

=== Top half ===
==== Section 1 ====
First Round
1	(Japan) Y Fukushima (Japan) S Hirota
BYE
(Hong Kong) Ng T Y (Hong Kong) Yeung N T	11	7	12	11	11
(Chinese Taipei) Cheng Y-c (Chinese Taipei) Hu L-f	9	11	14	9	8
(Indonesia) R H Putri (Indonesia) R Rositawati
(Singapore) Jin YJ (Singapore) Crystal Wong J Y	w	/	o
(Chinese Taipei) Chen H-h (Chinese Taipei) Huang M-c	11	7	8	6
(Japan) M Maeda (Japan) N Ono	8	11	11	11

Second Round
1	(Japan) Y Fukushima (Japan) S Hirota	11	11	11
(Hong Kong) Ng T Y (Hong Kong) Yeung N T	7	3	7
(Singapore) Jin YJ (Singapore) Crystal Wong J Y	11	5	5	10
(Japan) M Maeda (Japan) N Ono	6	11	11	11

Quarterfinals
1	(Japan) Y Fukushima (Japan) S Hirota	15	11	11
(Japan) M Maeda (Japan) N Ono	13	4	8

==== Section 2 ====
First Round
3	(Thailand) C Chaladchalam (Thailand) P Muenwong
BYE
(Japan) A Sakuramoto (Japan) Y Takahata	11	11	8	11
(Chinese Taipei) Chang C-h (Chinese Taipei) Chang H-t	3	3	11	6
(Chinese Taipei) Kuo Y-w (Chinese Taipei) Lin T-y	5	4	6
(Malaysia) Chow M K (Malaysia) Lee M Y	11	11	11
(Chinese Taipei) Wen H-y (Chinese Taipei) Ye J-y	6	4	2
(Japan) N Matsuyama (Japan) C Shida	11	11	11

Second Round
3	(Thailand) C Chaladchalam (Thailand) P Muenwong	8	7	7
(Japan) A Sakuramoto (Japan) Y Takahata	11	11	11
(Malaysia) Chow M K (Malaysia) Lee M Y	11	11	12
(Japan) N Matsuyama (Japan) C Shida	4	4	10

Quarterfinals
(Japan) A Sakuramoto (Japan) Y Takahata	14	11	11	11	9
(Malaysia) Chow M K (Malaysia) Lee M Y	15	13	9	9	11

=== Bottom half ===
==== Section 3 ====
First Round
(Hong Kong) Ng W Y (Hong Kong) Yuen S Y	12	10	6	3
(Chinese Taipei) Chen S-y (Chinese Taipei) Wu T-j	10	12	11	11
(Chinese Taipei) Hsieh P-s (Chinese Taipei) Lee C-c	8	8	5
(Indonesia) N P Lestari (Indonesia) M C Sahputri	11	11	11
(Chinese Taipei) Lee W-t (Chinese Taipei) Yu M-j	8	5	6
(Japan) A Kugo (Japan) M Yokoyama	11	11	11
BYE
4	(Japan) S Tanaka (Japan) K Yonemoto

Second Round
(Chinese Taipei) Chen S-y (Chinese Taipei) Wu T-j	7	7	11	7
(Indonesia) N P Lestari (Indonesia) M C Sahputri	11	11	8	11
(Japan) A Kugo (Japan) M Yokoyama	11	4	7
4	(Japan) S Tanaka (Japan) K Yonemoto	13	11	11

Quarterfinals
(Indonesia) N P Lestari (Indonesia) M C Sahputri	11	11	11	9	10
4	(Japan) S Tanaka (Japan) K Yonemoto	7	13	7	11	12

==== Section 4 ====
First Round
(Hong Kong) Cheung Y M (Hong Kong) Fan K Y	15	5	11	8	8
(Chinese Taipei) Lin X-m (Chinese Taipei) Wu F-c	14	11	6	11	11
(Chinese Taipei) Chiang K-h (Chinese Taipei) Hung S-h	11	10	6
(Malaysia) Lim Y L (Malaysia) Yap C W	13	12	11
(Thailand) P Chochuwong (Thailand) C Teachavorasinskun
(Chinese Taipei) Chiu Y-j (Chinese Taipei) Liu H-j	w	/	o
BYE
2	(Hong Kong) Poon L Y (Hong Kong) Tse Y S

Second Round
(Chinese Taipei) Lin X-m (Chinese Taipei) Wu F-c	8	7	9
(Malaysia) Lim Y L (Malaysia) Yap C W	11	11	11
(Chinese Taipei) Chiu Y-j (Chinese Taipei) Liu H-j	5	4	10
2	(Hong Kong) Poon L Y (Hong Kong) Tse Y S	11	11	12

Quarterfinals
(Malaysia) Lim Y L (Malaysia) Yap C W	11	11	11
2	(Hong Kong) Poon L Y (Hong Kong) Tse Y S	5	9	4

== Mixed doubles ==
=== Seeds ===
1. (Singapore) Terry Hee Yong Kai / Tan Wei Han (quarterfinals)
2. (Chinese Taipei) Liao Min-chun / Chen Hsiao-huan (second round)
3. (Chinese Taipei) Chang Ko-chi / Chang Hsin-tien (second round)
4. (Chinese Taipei) Lin Chia-yu / Wu Ti-jung (semifinals)

=== Finals ===
Semifinals
(Indonesia) Riky Widianto (Indonesia) Gloria Emanuelle Widjaja	5	11	8	6
(Hong Kong) Tang Chun Man (Hong Kong) Tse Ying Suet	11	7	11	11
4	(Chinese Taipei) Lin Chia-yu (Chinese Taipei) Wu Ti-jung	5	5	5
(Japan) Ryota Taohata (Japan) Koharu Yonemoto	11	11	11

Final
(Hong Kong) Tang Chun Man (Hong Kong) Tse Ying Suet	11	11	14
(Japan) Ryota Taohata (Japan) Koharu Yonemoto	3	7	12

=== Top half ===
==== Section 1 ====
First Round
1	(Singapore) Terry Hee Y K (Singapore) Tan W H
BYE
(Chinese Taipei) Huang Y-y (Chinese Taipei) Hsieh P-s	w	/	o
(Hong Kong) Law C H (Hong Kong) Ng W Y
(Thailand) T Isriyanet (Thailand) P Chochuwong
(Indonesia) R Widianto (Indonesia) G E Widjaja	w	/	o
(Chinese Taipei) Lin S-k (Chinese Taipei) Ye J-y	7	5	11	10
(Hong Kong) Ho W L (Hong Kong) Yuen S Y	11	11	3	12

Second Round
1	(Singapore) Terry Hee Y K (Singapore) Tan W H	11	11	4	11
(Chinese Taipei) Huang Y-y (Chinese Taipei) Hsieh P-s	6	5	11	7
(Indonesia) R Widianto (Indonesia) G E Widjaja	7	11	11	11
(Hong Kong) Ho W L (Hong Kong) Yuen S Y	11	7	7	4

Quarterfinals
1	(Singapore) Terry Hee Y K (Singapore) Tan W H	5	6	11	5
(Indonesia) R Widianto (Indonesia) G E Widjaja	11	11	3	11

==== Section 2 ====
First Round
3	(Chinese Taipei) Chang K-c (Chinese Taipei) Chang H-t
BYE
(Japan) Y Takeuchi (Japan) A Sakuramoto	11	11	11
(Chinese Taipei) Lu C-y (Chinese Taipei) Huang M-c	8	4	3
(Hong Kong) Tang C M (Hong Kong) Tse Y S	11	11	11
(Indonesia) R A Nugroho (Indonesia) M Mahmudin	8	4	6
(Chinese Taipei) Yang P-h (Chinese Taipei) Yang C-t	4	11	3	4
(Hong Kong) Tam C H (Hong Kong) Ng T Y	11	7	11	11

Second Round
3	(Chinese Taipei) Chang K-c (Chinese Taipei) Chang H-t	2	11	5
(Japan) Y Takeuchi (Japan) A Sakuramoto	11	13	11
(Hong Kong) Tang C M (Hong Kong) Tse Y S	11	7	15	11
(Hong Kong) Tam C H (Hong Kong) Ng T Y	7	11	14	2

Quarterfinals
(Japan) Y Takeuchi (Japan) A Sakuramoto	7	7	7
(Hong Kong) Tang C M (Hong Kong) Tse Y S	11	11	11

=== Bottom half ===
==== Section 3 ====
First Round
(Chinese Taipei) Hsu J-h (Chinese Taipei) Yu C-h	9	3	6
(Indonesia) E Subaktiar (Indonesia) R P Dili	11	11	11
(Singapore) D B Chrisnanta (Singapore) P S D Citra	7	11	11	11
(Hong Kong) Chan Y L (Hong Kong) Wu Y T	11	6	9	7
(Chinese Taipei) Tseng M-h (Chinese Taipei) Lin J-y	5	12	11	11
(Indonesia) Y E Saputra (Indonesia) M G Islami	11	10	8	7
BYE
4	(Chinese Taipei) Lin C-y (Chinese Taipei) Wu T-j

Second Round
(Indonesia) E Subaktiar (Indonesia) R P Dili	11	9	7
(Singapore) D B Chrisnanta (Singapore) P S D Citra	13	11	11
(Chinese Taipei) Tseng M-h (Chinese Taipei) Lin J-y	3	6	3
4	(Chinese Taipei) Lin C-y (Chinese Taipei) Wu T-j	11	11	11

Quarterfinals
(Singapore) D B Chrisnanta (Singapore) P S D Citra	11	8	11	9	9
4	(Chinese Taipei) Lin C-y (Chinese Taipei) Wu T-j	8	11	5	11	11

==== Section 4 ====
First Round
(Chinese Taipei) Chang C-h (Chinese Taipei) Po L-w	9	7	8
(Japan) R Taohata (Japan) K Yonemoto	11	11	11
(Hong Kong) Mak H C (Hong Kong) Yeung N T	11	11	11
(Indonesia) Y F Mainaky (Indonesia) L A Mainaky	4	2	6
(Chinese Taipei) Wang C-l (Chinese Taipei) Cheng C-y	11	11	11
(Thailand) P Thongnuam (Thailand) N Saengchote	9	9	9
BYE
2	(Chinese Taipei) Liao M-c (Chinese Taipei) Chen H-h

Second Round
(Japan) R Taohata (Japan) K Yonemoto	9	11	12	11
(Hong Kong) Mak H C (Hong Kong) Yeung N T	11	5	10	3
(Chinese Taipei) Wang C-l (Chinese Taipei) Cheng C-y	10	6	15	11	11
2	(Chinese Taipei) Liao M-c (Chinese Taipei) Chen H-h	12	11	14	8	7

Quarterfinals
(Japan) R Taohata (Japan) K Yonemoto	11	11	8	11
(Chinese Taipei) Wang C-l (Chinese Taipei) Cheng C-y	7	8	11	9

== See also ==
- List of sporting events in Taiwan

Preceded by 2016 Russia Open Grand Prix	BWF Grand Prix Gold and Grand Prix; 2016 BWF Season	Succeeded by 2016 Dutch Open Grand Prix
