= 2022 Korea Open (badminton) =

Badminton tournament in Korea

Tournament details
- Dates: 5–10 April
- Edition: 29th
- Level: Super 500
- Total prize money: US$360,000
- Venue: Palma Indoor Stadium
- Location: Suncheon, South Korea

Champions
- Men's singles: (China) Weng Hongyang
- Women's singles: (South Korea) An Se-young
- Men's doubles: (South Korea) Kang Min-hyuk (South Korea) Seo Seung-jae
- Women's doubles: (South Korea) Jeong Na-eun (South Korea) Kim Hye-jeong
- Mixed doubles: (Malaysia) Tan Kian Meng (Malaysia) Lai Pei Jing

The 2022 Korea Open was a badminton tournament that took place at Palma Indoor Stadium in Suncheon, South Korea, from 5–10 April 2022. The tournament had a total prize pool of $360,000.

== Tournament ==
The 2022 Korea Open was the eighth tournament of the 2022 BWF World Tour and was part of the Korea Open championships, which had been held since 1991. This tournament was organized by the Badminton Korea Association with sanction from the BWF.

=== Venue ===
This international tournament was held at Palma Indoor Stadium in Suncheon, South Korea. This was the first Korea Open to be held in Suncheon.

=== Point distribution ===
Below is the point distribution table for each phase of the tournament based on the BWF points system for the BWF World Tour Super 500 event.

Winner	Runner-up	3/4	5/8	9/16	17/32
9,200	7,800	6,420	5,040	3,600	2,220

=== Prize pool ===
The total prize money was US$360,000 with the distribution of the prize money in accordance with BWF regulations.

Event	Winner	Finalist	Semi-finals	Quarter-finals	Last 16
Singles	$27,000	$13,680	$5,220	$2,160	$1,260
Doubles	$28,440	$13,680	$5,040	$2,610	$1,350

== Men's singles ==
=== Seeds ===
1. (Indonesia) Anthony Sinisuka Ginting (first round)
2. (Malaysia) Lee Zii Jia (withdrew)
3. (Indonesia) Jonatan Christie (final)
4. (Singapore) Loh Kean Yew (withdrew)
5. (India) Srikanth Kidambi (semi-finals)
6. (India) Lakshya Sen (second round)
7. (Denmark) Rasmus Gemke (withdrew)
8. (Thailand) Kunlavut Vitidsarn (quarter-finals)

=== Finals ===
Semi-finals
PFR	(Denmark) Victor Svendsen	20	13
PFR	(China) Weng Hongyang	22	21
3	(Indonesia) Jonatan Christie	21	21
5	(India) Srikanth Kidambi	19	16

Final
PFR	(China) Weng Hongyang	12	21	21
3	(Indonesia) Jonatan Christie	21	19	15

=== Top half ===
==== Section 1 ====
First round
1	(Indonesia) A S Ginting	16	13
(France) L Claerbout	21	21
PFR	(Denmark) K Bruun	12	15
PFR	(Denmark) V Svendsen	21	21
6	(India) L Sen	14	21	21
PFR	(South Korea) Choi J-h	21	16	18
(Thailand) S Thammasin	18	21	9
(Indonesia) S H Rhustavito	21	14	21

Second round
(France) L Claerbout	14	18
PFR	(Denmark) V Svendsen	21	21
6	(India) L Sen	20	9
(Indonesia) S H Rhustavito	22	21

Quarter-finals
PFR	(Denmark) V Svendsen	21	21
(Indonesia) S H Rhustavito	14	12

==== Section 2 ====
First round
PFR	(South Korea) Kim D-h	21	21
PFR	(Germany) K Schäfer	18	12
(Finland) K Koljonen	13	15
(Malaysia) Ng T Y	21	21
PFR	(China) Weng HY	21	21
(South Korea) Heo K-h	12	16
(Malaysia) Cheam J W	21	21
(India) Prannoy H. S.	17	7

Second round
PFR	(South Korea) Kim D-h	14	19
(Malaysia) Ng T Y	21	21
PFR	(China) Weng HY	21	17	21
(Malaysia) Cheam J W	14	21	17

Quarter-finals
(Malaysia) Ng T Y	11	12
PFR	(China) Weng HY	21	21

=== Bottom half ===
==== Section 3 ====
First round
PFR	(Czech Republic) J Louda	21	21
(South Korea) Lee D-k	15	19
(Japan) K Watanabe	12	10
8	(Thailand) K Vitidsarn	21	21
(Japan) K Naraoka	21	21
PFR	(Algeria) K Mammeri	12	12
(Malaysia) Soong J V	13	18
3	(Indonesia) J Christie	21	21

Second round
PFR	(Czech Republic) J Louda	12	15
8	(Thailand) K Vitidsarn	21	21
(Japan) K Naraoka	16	11
3	(Indonesia) J Christie	21	21

Quarter-finals
8	(Thailand) K Vitidsarn	21	17	19
3	(Indonesia) J Christie	8	21	21

==== Section 4 ====
First round
(Israel) M Zilberman	21	21
(China) Li SF	17	16
(Malaysia) Liew D	20	11
5	(India) S Kidambi	22	21
PFR	(Algeria) Y S Medel	6	8
(Thailand) K Wangcharoen	21	21
PFR	(Singapore) J Teh	19	21	13
PFR	(South Korea) Son W-h	21	14	21

Second round
(Israel) M Zilberman	18	6
5	(India) S Kidambi	21	21
(Thailand) K Wangcharoen	17	14
PFR	(South Korea) Son W-h	21	21

Quarter-finals
5	(India) S Kidambi	21	18	21
PFR	(South Korea) Son W-h	12	21	12

== Women's singles ==
=== Seeds ===
1. (China) Chen Yufei (second round)
2. (South Korea) An Se-young (champion)
3. (India) P. V. Sindhu (semi-finals)
4. (Thailand) Ratchanok Intanon (quarter-finals)
5. (China) He Bingjiao (withdrew)
6. (Thailand) Pornpawee Chochuwong (final)
7. (Thailand) Busanan Ongbamrungphan (quarter-finals)
8. (Canada) Michelle Li (first round)

=== Finals ===
Semi-finals
(South Korea) Kim Ga-eun	21	14	14
6	(Thailand) Pornpawee Chochuwong	17	21	21
3	(India) P. V. Sindhu	14	17
2	(South Korea) An Se-young	21	21

Final
6	(Thailand) Pornpawee Chochuwong	17	18
2	(South Korea) An Se-young	21	21

=== Top half ===
==== Section 1 ====
First round
1	(China) Chen YF	21	21
(Thailand) P Chaiwan	12	14
(Singapore) J Hooi	7	8
(South Korea) Kim G-e	21	21
PFR	(South Korea) Lee S-y	21	21
(Israel) K Polikarpova	7	8
(Japan) A Takahashi	19	21	17
PFR	(Malaysia) Goh J W	21	16	21

Second round
1	(China) Chen YF	17	19
(South Korea) Kim G-e	21	21
PFR	(South Korea) Lee S-y	17	21	12
PFR	(Malaysia) Goh J W	21	17	21

Quarter-finals
(South Korea) Kim G-e	21	21
PFR	(Malaysia) Goh J W	15	18

==== Section 2 ====
First round
4	(Thailand) R Intanon	21	21
PFR	(South Korea) Jeon J-i	14	13
PFR	(Canada) C Choi
(Scotland) K Gilmour	w	/	o
6	(Thailand) P Chochuwong	21	21
(Czech Republic) T Švábíková	10	8
(India) M Bansod	20	22	21
(China) Han Y	22	20	10

Second round
4	(Thailand) R Intanon	21	21
(Scotland) K Gilmour	14	14
6	(Thailand) P Chochuwong	21	21
(India) M Bansod	8	14

Quarter-finals
4	(Thailand) R Intanon	21	12	13
6	(Thailand) P Chochuwong	18	21	21

=== Bottom half ===
==== Section 3 ====
First round
(Thailand) S Katethong	21	16	19
(China) Wang ZY	17	21	21
(South Korea) Kim H-m	11	5
7	(Thailand) B Ongbamrungphan	21	21
PFR	(Hungary) D Gonda	9	18
(Japan) A Ohori	21	21
(United States) L Lam	15	14
3	(India) P. V. Sindhu	21	21

Second round
(China) Wang ZY	17	21	18
7	(Thailand) B Ongbamrungphan	21	17	21
(Japan) A Ohori	15	10
3	(India) P. V. Sindhu	21	21

Quarter-finals
7	(Thailand) B Ongbamrungphan	10	16
3	(India) P. V. Sindhu	21	21

==== Section 4 ====
First round
(France) Y Hoyaux	21	21
(Czech Republic) K Tomalová	17	10
(Japan) S Kawakami	21	15	21
8	(Canada) M Li	12	21	13
(South Korea) Sim Y-j	10	13
(Singapore) Yeo J M	21	21
(India) S K P Kudaravalli	5	13
2	(South Korea) An S-y	21	21

Second round
(France) Y Hoyaux	13	6
(Japan) S Kawakami	21	21
(Singapore) Yeo J M	10	10
2	(South Korea) An S-y	21	21

Quarter-finals
(Japan) S Kawakami	14	7
2	(South Korea) An S-y	21	21

== Men's doubles ==
=== Seeds ===
1. (Indonesia) Marcus Fernaldi Gideon / Kevin Sanjaya Sukamuljo (withdrew)
2. (Indonesia) Mohammad Ahsan / Hendra Setiawan (semi-finals)
3. (India) Satwiksairaj Rankireddy / Chirag Shetty (quarter-finals)
4. (Indonesia) Fajar Alfian / Muhammad Rian Ardianto (final)
5. (Denmark) Kim Astrup / Anders Skaarup Rasmussen (withdrew)
6. (Malaysia) Ong Yew Sin / Teo Ee Yi (quarter-finals)
7. (England) Ben Lane / Sean Vendy (withdrew)
8. (South Korea) Ko Sung-hyun / Shin Baek-cheol (withdrew)

=== Finals ===
Semi-finals
(Indonesia) Muhammad Shohibul Fikri (Indonesia) Bagas Maulana	12	9
4	(Indonesia) Fajar Alfian (Indonesia) Muhammad Rian Ardianto	21	21
(South Korea) Kang Min-hyuk (South Korea) Seo Seung-jae	21	17	21
2	(Indonesia) Mohammad Ahsan (Indonesia) Hendra Setiawan	16	21	9

Final
4	(Indonesia) Fajar Alfian (Indonesia) Muhammad Rian Ardianto	21	15	18
(South Korea) Kang Min-hyuk (South Korea) Seo Seung-jae	19	21	21

=== Top half ===
==== Section 1 ====
First round
PFR	(South Korea) Jin Y (South Korea) Na S-s	21	21
(Singapore) D B Chrisnanta (Singapore) A Kwek	11	18
(South Korea) Kim J-hw (South Korea) Kim Y-h	21	21
(South Korea) Kim J-hy (South Korea) Lee Y-d	10	13
8	(South Korea) Ko S-h (South Korea) Shin B-c
(Indonesia) M S Fikri (Indonesia) B Maulana	w	/	o
(Indonesia) P Kusumawardana (Indonesia) Y Rambitan	21	21
(India) K P Garaga (India) V G Panjala	14	19

Second round
PFR	(South Korea) Jin Y (South Korea) Na S-s	21	21
(South Korea) Kim J-hw (South Korea) Kim Y-h	11	17
(Indonesia) M S Fikri (Indonesia) B Maulana	15	21	21
(Indonesia) P Kusumawardana (Indonesia) Y Rambitan	21	15	12

Quarter-finals
PFR	(South Korea) Jin Y (South Korea) Na S-s	20	18
(Indonesia) M S Fikri (Indonesia) B Maulana	22	21

==== Section 2 ====
First round
4	(Indonesia) F Alfian (Indonesia) M R Ardianto	21	21
PFR	(South Korea) Na G-m (South Korea) Noh J-s	16	12
PFR	(South Korea) Kim H-t (South Korea) Yoon D-i	18	13
(Malaysia) Tan K M (Malaysia) Tan W K	21	21
6	(Malaysia) Ong Y S (Malaysia) Teo E Y	21	21
(India) B Navaneeth (India) B. S Reddy	14	12
(Indonesia) L R Carnando (Indonesia) D Marthin	7	21	21
(Japan) H Okamura (Japan) M Onodera	21	13	13

Second round
4	(Indonesia) F Alfian (Indonesia) M R Ardianto	19	21	21
(Malaysia) Tan K M (Malaysia) Tan W K	21	13	13
6	(Malaysia) Ong Y S (Malaysia) Teo E Y	22	21
(Indonesia) L R Carnando (Indonesia) D Marthin	20	11

Quarter-finals
4	(Indonesia) F Alfian (Indonesia) M R Ardianto	21	22
6	(Malaysia) Ong Y S (Malaysia) Teo E Y	19	20

=== Bottom half ===
==== Section 3 ====
First round
(Malaysia) N M Azriyn A (Malaysia) Lim K W	17	19
(Malaysia) Goh V S (Malaysia) Low J S	21	21
(South Korea) Kang M-h (South Korea) Seo S-j	21	25
PFR	(South Korea) Jang S-h (South Korea) Ki D-j	14	23
(Algeria) K Mammeri (Algeria) Y S Medel	15	13
(Singapore) T Hee (Singapore) Loh K H	21	21
PFR	(South Korea) Shin T-y (South Korea) Wang C	16	15
3	(India) S Rankireddy (India) C Shetty	21	21

Second round
(Malaysia) Goh V S (Malaysia) Low J S	6	20
(South Korea) Kang M-h (South Korea) Seo S-j	21	22
(Singapore) T Hee (Singapore) Loh K H	15	19
3	(India) S Rankireddy (India) C Shetty	21	21

Quarter-finals
(South Korea) Kang M-h (South Korea) Seo S-j	22	18	22
3	(India) S Rankireddy (India) C Shetty	20	21	20

==== Section 4 ====
First round
(South Korea) Choi S-g (South Korea) Kim W-h	w	/	o
(China) Liu C (China) Zhang N
PFR	(Czech Republic) O Král (Czech Republic) A Mendrek	19	15
PFR	(South Korea) Kim T-k (South Korea) Lee S-m	21	21
PFR	(South Korea) Kim B-d (South Korea) Park H-y
(India) Arjun M. R. (India) D Kapila	w	/	o
PFR	(South Korea) Choo C (South Korea) Choo J	16	15
2	(Indonesia) M Ahsan (Indonesia) H Setiawan	21	21

Second round
(South Korea) Choi S-g (South Korea) Kim W-h	21	21
PFR	(South Korea) Kim T-k (South Korea) Lee S-m	12	15
(India) Arjun M. R. (India) D Kapila	5^{r}
2	(Indonesia) M Ahsan (Indonesia) H Setiawan	8

Quarter-finals
(South Korea) Choi S-g (South Korea) Kim W-h	17	13
2	(Indonesia) M Ahsan (Indonesia) H Setiawan	21	21

== Women's doubles ==
=== Seeds ===
1. (India) Ashwini Ponnappa / N. Sikki Reddy (quarter-finals)
2. (South Korea) Jeong Na-eun / Kim Hye-jeong (champions)

=== Bracket ===
First round
(Thailand) Benyapa Aimsaard (Thailand) Nuntakarn Aimsaard	21	21
(Malaysia) Vivian Hoo (Malaysia) Lim Chiew Sien	10	19
(South Korea) Chang Ye-na (South Korea) Jung Kyung-eun	w	/	o
(Canada) Catherine Choi (Canada) Josephine Wu

Quarter-finals
1	(India) Ashwini Ponnappa (India) N. Sikki Reddy	19	17
(South Korea) Eom Hye-won (South Korea) Kim Bo-ryeong	21	21
(South Korea) Kim Min-ji (South Korea) Seong Seung-yeon	11	20
(Thailand) Benyapa Aimsaard (Thailand) Nuntakarn Aimsaard	21	22
(South Korea) Chang Ye-na (South Korea) Jung Kyung-eun	29	21	21
(South Korea) Jang Eun-seo (South Korea) Kim Hye-rin	30	17	12
(Singapore) Jin Yujia (Singapore) Crystal Wong	13	11
2	(South Korea) Jeong Na-eun (South Korea) Kim Hye-jeong	21	21

Semi-finals
(South Korea) Eom Hye-won (South Korea) Kim Bo-ryeong	17	8
(Thailand) Benyapa Aimsaard (Thailand) Nuntakarn Aimsaard	21	21
(South Korea) Chang Ye-na (South Korea) Jung Kyung-eun	21	12
2	(South Korea) Jeong Na-eun (South Korea) Kim Hye-jeong	23	21

Final
(Thailand) Benyapa Aimsaard (Thailand) Nuntakarn Aimsaard	16	12
2	(South Korea) Jeong Na-eun (South Korea) Kim Hye-jeong	21	21

== Mixed doubles ==
=== Seeds ===
1. (South Korea) Seo Seung-jae / Chae Yoo-jung (withdrew)
2. (Malaysia) Tan Kian Meng / Lai Pei Jing (champions)
3. (Malaysia) Goh Soon Huat / Shevon Jemie Lai (second round)
4. (South Korea) Ko Sung-hyun / Eom Hye-won (final)
5. (China) Ou Xuanyi / Huang Yaqiong (quarter-finals)
6. (Indonesia) Rinov Rivaldy / Pitha Haningtyas Mentari (semi-finals)
7. (Indonesia) Adnan Maulana / Mychelle Crhystine Bandaso (quarter-finals)
8. (Singapore) Terry Hee / Tan Wei Han (second round)

=== Finals ===
Semi-finals
(South Korea) Kim Won-ho (South Korea) Jeong Na-eun	9	15
4	(South Korea) Ko Sung-hyun (South Korea) Eom Hye-won	21	21
6	(Indonesia) Rinov Rivaldy (Indonesia) Pitha Haningtyas Mentari	13	20
2	(Malaysia) Tan Kian Meng (Malaysia) Lai Pei Jing	21	22

Final
4	(South Korea) Ko Sung-hyun (South Korea) Eom Hye-won	15	18
2	(Malaysia) Tan Kian Meng (Malaysia) Lai Pei Jing	21	21

=== Top half ===
==== Section 1 ====
First round
(South Korea) Kim Y-h (South Korea) Kim H-j	14	16
(South Korea) Kim W-h (South Korea) Jeong N-e	21	21

Second round
1	(South Korea) Seo S-j (South Korea) Chae Y-j
(Malaysia) Ong Y S (Malaysia) Goh L Y	w	/	o
8	(Singapore) T Hee (Singapore) Tan W H	21	18	12
(South Korea) Kim W-h (South Korea) Jeong N-e	19	21	21

Quarter-finals
(Malaysia) Ong Y S (Malaysia) Goh L Y	14	23	16
(South Korea) Kim W-h (South Korea) Jeong N-e	21	21	21

==== Section 2 ====
First round
(South Korea) Kang M-h (South Korea) Baek H-n	22	23
(Canada) T A Linderman (Canada) J Wu	20	21
(South Korea) Shin T-y (South Korea) Chang Y-n	21	21
(Japan) Y Nishikawa (Japan) S Ozaki	9	14

Second round
4	(South Korea) Ko S-h (South Korea) Eom H-w	16	21	21
(South Korea) Kang M-h (South Korea) Baek H-n	21	19	8
7	(Indonesia) A Maulana (Indonesia) M C Bandaso	12	21	21
(South Korea) Shin T-y (South Korea) Chang Y-n	21	10	9

Quarter-finals
4	(South Korea) Ko S-h (South Korea) Eom H-w	21	18	21
7	(Indonesia) A Maulana (Indonesia) M C Bandaso	19	21	18

=== Bottom half ===
==== Section 3 ====
First round
(South Korea) Wang C (South Korea) Jung K-e	18	15
(South Korea) Ki D-j (South Korea) Kim H-r	21	21
(Israel) M Zilberman (Israel) S Zilberman	9	10
(Japan) H Midorikawa (Japan) N Saito	21	21

Second round
(South Korea) Ki D-j (South Korea) Kim H-r	14	21	24
6	(Indonesia) R Rivaldy (Indonesia) P H Mentari	21	19	26
(Japan) H Midorikawa (Japan) N Saito	21	23
3	(Malaysia) Goh S H (Malaysia) S J Lai	15	21

Quarter-finals
6	(Indonesia) R Rivaldy (Indonesia) P H Mentari	15	21	21
(Japan) H Midorikawa (Japan) N Saito	21	18	16

==== Section 4 ====
First round
(India) B. S Reddy (India) A Ponnappa	21	21
(Singapore) A Kwek (Singapore) Jin YJ	19	18

Second round
(India) B. S Reddy (India) A Ponnappa	20	21	14
5	(China) Ou XY (China) Huang YQ	22	18	21
(South Korea) Na S-s (South Korea) Kim M-j	11	9
2	(Malaysia) Tan K M (Malaysia) Lai P J	21	21

Quarter-finals
5	(China) Ou XY (China) Huang YQ	18	17
2	(Malaysia) Tan K M (Malaysia) Lai P J	21	21

Preceded by 2022 Orléans Masters	BWF World Tour; 2022 BWF season	Succeeded by 2022 Korea Masters
