= Muhammad Rian Ardianto =

Indonesian badminton player

Personal information
- Born: 13 February 1996 (age 30) Bantul, SR Yogyakarta, Indonesia
- Height: 1.74 m (5 ft 9 in)
- Weight: 67 kg (148 lb)
- Spouse: Ribka Sugiarto (m. 2024)

Sport
- Country: Indonesia
- Sport: Badminton
- Handedness: Right
- Coached by: Aryono Miranat

Men's doubles
- Highest ranking: 1 (with Fajar Alfian, 27 December 2022)
- Current ranking: 38 (with Rahmat Hidayat, 27 October 2026)
- BWF profile
Medal record
Men's badminton
Representing Indonesia
World Championships
Bronze medal – third place	2019 Basel	Men's doubles
Bronze medal – third place	2022 Tokyo	Men's doubles
Sudirman Cup
Bronze medal – third place	2025 Xiamen	Mixed team
Thomas Cup
Gold medal – first place	2020 Aarhus	Men's team
Silver medal – second place	2022 Bangkok	Men's team
Silver medal – second place	2024 Chengdu	Men's team
Bronze medal – third place	2018 Bangkok	Men's team
Asian Games
Silver medal – second place	2018 Jakarta–Palembang	Men's doubles
Silver medal – second place	2018 Jakarta–Palembang	Men's team
Asian Championships
Bronze medal – third place	2022 Manila	Men's doubles
Asia Mixed Team Championships
Bronze medal – third place	2019 Hong Kong	Mixed team
Asia Team Championships
Gold medal – first place	2020 Manila	Men's team
Bronze medal – third place	2026 Qingdao	Men's team
SEA Games
Gold medal – first place	2017 Kuala Lumpur	Men's team
Gold medal – first place	2019 Philippines	Men's team
Bronze medal – third place	2017 Kuala Lumpur	Men's doubles
World Junior Championships
Silver medal – second place	2014 Alor Setar	Mixed doubles
Silver medal – second place	2014 Alor Setar	Mixed team
Bronze medal – third place	2014 Alor Setar	Boys' doubles
Asian Junior Championships
Bronze medal – third place	2014 Taipei	Mixed doubles

Muhammad Rian Ardianto (born 13 February 1996) is an Indonesian badminton player. Born in Bantul, Yogyakarta SR, Ardianto plays for the Jaya Raya Jakarta club at national events. He won the men's doubles silver medal at the 2018 Asian Games, the bronze medals at the 2017 SEA Games, and at the 2019 and 2022 World Championships. Ardianto was part of Indonesia winning team at the 2020 Thomas Cup. He reached a career high of world number 1 in the men's doubles with Fajar Alfian on 27 December 2022.

== Career ==
In the junior events, Ardianto has collected two silvers and a bronze at the World Junior Championships, and also a bronze medal at the Asian Junior Championships. Partnering Fajar Alfian in the men's doubles event, they have won some international tournaments including the Indonesia International in 2014, 2015, and 2016; the Austrian International in 2015; and at the BWF Grand Prix level, the 2016 Chinese Taipei Masters.

Ardianto was a member of the Indonesia men's team that won gold medals at the 2017 and 2019 SEA Games. He also played with Alfian, and clinched the men's doubles bronze at that event in 2017. In 2018, Ardianto and Alfian competed on the BWF World Tour, and won titles at the Malaysia Masters and the Syed Modi International, and at the 2019 Swiss and Korea Opens. The duo were a silver medalists at the 2018 Asian Games, and bronze medalists at the 2019 BWF World Championships.

In February 2020, Ardianto alongside Indonesia men's team won the Asia Team Championships held in Manila. In September–October 2021, Ardianto alongside Indonesia team competed at the 2021 Sudirman Cup in Vantaa, Finland. He and Alfian contribute a point in a tie against Canada. Indonesia team advanced to the knocked-out stage, but stopped in the quarter-finals to Malaysia. In the next tournament, he helped Indonesia team won the World Men's Team Championships, the 2020 Thomas Cup.

=== 2022: World number 1 ===
In the first half of 2022, the Ardianto and Alfian partnership have won three titles of seven finals that they reached. The duo won the Swiss Open, Indonesia and Malaysia Masters, and finished runners-up at the Korea, Thailand, Malaysia and Singapore Opens. They also won bronze medals at the Asian and World Championships. In October, they won their fourth title of the year at the Denmark Open. He and his partner qualified for their first ever World Tour Finals. Competed as the first seed, they lost to Liu Yuchen and Ou Xuanyi in the semi-finals. In the final week of 2022, they topped the men's doubles world ranking.

=== 2023 ===
In January, the Ardianto and Alfian partnership won their first Super 1000 tournament at the Malaysia Open by defeating Chinese pair Liang Weikeng and Wang Chang. In the following week, as the last man stand, they were defeated in the semi-finals of India Open by 3rd seed Malaysian pair Aaron Chia and Soh Wooi Yik, and made Indonesia going home empty handed. They competed in the home tournament, Indonesia Masters, but unfortunately lost in the quarter-finals from 5th seed Chinese pair Liu Yuchen and Ou Xuanyi.

In February, Ardianto join the Indonesia national badminton team to compete at the Badminton Asia Mixed Team Championships, but unfortunately the teams lost in the quarter-finals from team Korea.

With the Indonesian federation skipping the German Open, Ardianto and Alfian resumed competition at the All England in March. They won their first ever All England title in an all-Indonesian final against Mohammad Ahsan and Hendra Setiawan. At the Spain Masters they lost in the quarter-finals from unseeded Chinese Taipei player Lee Fang-chih and Lee Fang-jen.

In late April, Ardianto competed at the Asian Championships in Dubai, United Arab Emirates, but had to lose in the quarter-finals from 8th seed Malaysian pair Ong Yew Sin and Teo Ee Yi.

In May, Ardianto alongside the Indonesian team competed at the 2023 Sudirman Cup in Suzhou, China. He won a match in the group stage, against Supak Jomkoh and Kittinupong Kedren of Thailand. Indonesia advanced to the knockout stage but lost at the quarterfinals against China. In the following week, Ardianto competed in the second Asian Tour at the Malaysia Masters. Unfortunately, he lost in the first round from eventual winner Korean pair Kang Min-hyuk and Seo Seung-jae.

In June, Ardianto competed at the Singapore Open, but lost in the first round from English pair Ben Lane and Sean Vendy. In the next tour, they competed at the home tournament, Indonesia Open, but lost in the quarter finals from 7th seed and eventual champions Indian pair Satwiksairaj Rankireddy and Chirag Shetty in straight matches.

In July, Ardianto competed at the Korea Open, but lost in the final against 3rd seed Indian pair Satwiksairaj Rankireddy and Chirag Shetty for second times in a row. In the next tour, he competed at the Japan Open, but lost in the semi-finals against Chinese Taipei pair Lee Yang and Wang Chi-lin.

In early August, Ardianto competed at the Australian Open, but had to lose in the quarter-finals from 8th seed Korean pair Kang Min-hyuk and Seo Seung-jae in rubber games. In late August, he competed at the World Championships, but lost in the second round from Taiwanese pair Lee Jhe-huei and Yang Po-hsuan in straight games. Making his second appearance at the Asian Games in Hangzhou, Ardianto failed to bring home any medals after losing in the quarter-finals in both the men's doubles and team events.

=== 2024 ===
Ardianto and Alfian started out the season at the Malaysia Open, where they were defending champions. The pair lost to first seeds Liang Weikeng and Wang Chang in the quarter-finals. At the India Open, they again lost in the quarter-finals, this time to Kang Min-hyuk and Seo Seung-jae. Their results improved slightly at the Indonesia Masters, where they bowed out in the semi-finals to teammates and eventual champions Leo Rolly Carnando and Daniel Marthin. At the French Open, Ardianto and Alfian were stopped in the quarter-finals by Taiwanese pair Lee Jhe-huei and Yang Po-hsuan. They obtained their first title of the year at the All England Open, after defending their title against Malaysia's Aaron Chia and Soh Wooi Yik. The duo reached the finals in the Singapore Open in June, losing to He Jiting and Ren Xiangyu. It took months to win their second title, where in November they emerged victorious in the Japan Masters beating host pairing Takuro Hoki and Yugo Kobayashi. Ardianto and Alfian have participated in 13 BWF World Tours this year, and have only suffered two defeats in the early rounds, in the first round of the Indonesia Open and the second round of the China Masters. Together with the Indonesia national team, Ardianto won the silver medal in the Thomas Cup, after the team was defeated by the host country China 1–3. He also made his debut at the Olympics in Paris, stopped in the quarter-finals to number 1 seed Liang Weikeng and Wang Chang.

=== 2025 ===
Ardianto and Alfian had a bad start in 2025, losing out in early rounds in Malaysia Open and India Open. They manage to recover well in their home ground Indonesia Masters by advancing to the final before losing to Man Wei Chong and Tee Kai Wun with the score 19–21, 11–21.

== Personal life ==
Ardianto has been in a relationship with teammate Ribka Sugiarto since 2020. The two became officially engaged in December 2023. On 28 September 2024, Ardianto and Sugiarto were married. Their wedding ceremony was held in Karanganyar Regency, Sugiarto's hometown.

== Awards and nominations ==
Award	Year	Category	Result	Ref.
Gatra Awards	2021	Sports Category with 2020 Thomas Cup squad	Won	
BWF Awards	2022	Most Improved Player of The Year with Fajar Alfian	Won	
Golden Award SIWO PWI	2019	Favorite Team with 2018 Asian Games men's badminton team	Nominated	
Indonesian Sport Awards	2018	Favorite Male Athlete Duos with Fajar Alfian	Nominated	
iNews Indonesia Awards	2023	Favorite Athlete with Fajar Alfian	Nominated	

== Achievements ==
=== BWF World Championships ===
Men's doubles
Year	Venue	Partner	Opponent	Score	Result	Ref.
2019	St. Jakobshalle; Basel, Switzerland	(Indonesia) Fajar Alfian	(Indonesia) Mohammad Ahsan (Indonesia) Hendra Setiawan	16–21, 21–15, 10–21	Bronze	
2022	Tokyo Metropolitan Gymnasium; Tokyo, Japan	(Indonesia) Fajar Alfian	(Indonesia) Mohammad Ahsan (Indonesia) Hendra Setiawan	21–23, 21–12, 16–21	Bronze	

=== Asian Games ===
Men's doubles
Year	Venue	Partner	Opponent	Score	Result	Ref.
2018	Istora Gelora Bung Karno; Jakarta, Indonesia	(Indonesia) Fajar Alfian	(Indonesia) Marcus Fernaldi Gideon (Indonesia) Kevin Sanjaya Sukamuljo	21–13, 18–21, 22–24	Silver	

=== Asian Championships ===
Men's doubles
Year	Venue	Partner	Opponent	Score	Result	Ref.
2022	Muntinlupa Sports Complex; Metro Manila, Philippines	(Indonesia) Fajar Alfian	(Indonesia) Pramudya Kusumawardana (Indonesia) Yeremia Rambitan	20–22, 21–13, 18–21	Bronze	

=== SEA Games ===
Men's doubles
Year	Venue	Partner	Opponent	Score	Result	Ref.
2017	Axiata Arena; Kuala Lumpur, Malaysia	(Indonesia) Fajar Alfian	(Thailand) Kittinupong Kedren (Thailand) Dechapol Puavaranukroh	17–21, 21–23	Bronze	

=== BWF World Junior Championships ===
Boys' doubles
Year	Venue	Partner	Opponent	Score	Result	Ref.
2014	Stadium Sultan Abdul Halim; Alor Setar, Malaysia	(Indonesia) Clinton Hendrik Kudamassa	(Japan) Masahide Nakata (Japan) Katsuki Tamate	21–15, 20–22, 18–21	Bronze	

Mixed doubles
Year	Venue	Partner	Opponent	Score	Result	Ref.
2014	Stadium Sultan Abdul Halim; Alor Setar, Malaysia	(Indonesia) Rosyita Eka Putri Sari	(China) Huang Kaixiang (China) Chen Qingchen	12–21, 17–21	Silver	

=== Asian Junior Championships ===
Mixed doubles
Year	Venue	Partner	Opponent	Score	Result	Ref.
2014	Taipei Gymnasium; Taipei, Taiwan	(Indonesia) Zakia Ulfa	(South Korea) Kim Jung-ho (South Korea) Kong Hee-yong	17–21, 21–15, 5–21	Bronze	

=== BWF World Tour (13 titles, 8 runners-up) ===
The BWF World Tour, which was announced on 19 March 2017 and implemented in 2018, is a series of elite badminton tournaments sanctioned by the Badminton World Federation (BWF). The BWF World Tour is divided into levels of World Tour Finals, Super 1000, Super 750, Super 500, Super 300, and the BWF Tour Super 100.

Men's doubles
Year	Tournament	Level	Partner	Opponent	Score	Result	Ref.
2018	Malaysia Masters	Super 500	(Indonesia) Fajar Alfian	(Malaysia) Goh V Shem (Malaysia) Tan Wee Kiong	14–21, 24–22, 21–13	(gold) Winner	
2018	German Open	Super 300	(Indonesia) Fajar Alfian	(Japan) Takuto Inoue (Japan) Yuki Kaneko	16–21, 18–21	(silver) Runner-up	
2018	Syed Modi International	Super 300	(Indonesia) Fajar Alfian	(India) Satwiksairaj Rankireddy (India) Chirag Shetty	21–11, 22–20	(gold) Winner	
2019	Swiss Open	Super 300	(Indonesia) Fajar Alfian	(Chinese Taipei) Lee Yang (Chinese Taipei) Wang Chi-lin	21–19, 21–16	(gold) Winner	
2019	Korea Open	Super 500	(Indonesia) Fajar Alfian	(Japan) Takeshi Kamura (Japan) Keigo Sonoda	21–16, 21–17	(gold) Winner	
2022	Swiss Open	Super 300	(Indonesia) Fajar Alfian	(Malaysia) Goh Sze Fei (Malaysia) Nur Izzuddin	21–18, 21–19	(gold) Winner	
2022	Korea Open	Super 500	(Indonesia) Fajar Alfian	(South Korea) Kang Min-hyuk (South Korea) Seo Seung-jae	21–19, 15–21, 18–21	(silver) Runner-up	
2022	Thailand Open	Super 500	(Indonesia) Fajar Alfian	(Japan) Takuro Hoki (Japan) Yugo Kobayashi	4–13^{r}	(silver) Runner-up	
2022	Indonesia Masters	Super 500	(Indonesia) Fajar Alfian	(China) Liang Weikeng (China) Wang Chang	21–10, 21–17	(gold) Winner	
2022	Malaysia Open	Super 750	(Indonesia) Fajar Alfian	(Japan) Takuro Hoki (Japan) Yugo Kobayashi	22–24, 21–16, 9–21	(silver) Runner-up	
2022	Malaysia Masters	Super 500	(Indonesia) Fajar Alfian	(Indonesia) Mohammad Ahsan (Indonesia) Hendra Setiawan	21–12, 21–19	(gold) Winner	
2022	Singapore Open	Super 500	(Indonesia) Fajar Alfian	(Indonesia) Leo Rolly Carnando (Indonesia) Daniel Marthin	21–9, 14–21, 16–21	(silver) Runner-up	
2022	Denmark Open	Super 750	(Indonesia) Fajar Alfian	(Indonesia) Marcus Fernaldi Gideon (Indonesia) Kevin Sanjaya Sukamuljo	21–19, 28–26	(gold) Winner	
2023	Malaysia Open	Super 1000	(Indonesia) Fajar Alfian	(China) Liang Weikeng (China) Wang Chang	21–18, 18–21, 21–13	(gold) Winner	
2023	All England Open	Super 1000	(Indonesia) Fajar Alfian	(Indonesia) Mohammad Ahsan (Indonesia) Hendra Setiawan	21–17, 21–14	(gold) Winner	
2023	Korea Open	Super 500	(Indonesia) Fajar Alfian	(India) Satwiksairaj Rankireddy (India) Chirag Shetty	21–17, 13–21, 14–21	(silver) Runner-up	
2024	All England Open	Super 1000	(Indonesia) Fajar Alfian	(Malaysia) Aaron Chia (Malaysia) Soh Wooi Yik	21–16, 21–16	(gold) Winner	
2024	Singapore Open	Super 750	(Indonesia) Fajar Alfian	(China) He Jiting (China) Ren Xiangyu	19–21, 14–21	(silver) Runner-up	
2024	Japan Masters	Super 500	(Indonesia) Fajar Alfian	(Japan) Takuro Hoki (Japan) Yugo Kobayashi	21–15, 17–21, 21–17	(gold) Winner	
2025	Indonesia Masters	Super 500	(Indonesia) Fajar Alfian	(Malaysia) Man Wei Chong (Malaysia) Tee Kai Wun	11–21, 19–21	(silver) Runner-up	
2026	Indonesia Masters	Super 100	(Indonesia) Daniel Edgar Marvino	(South Korea) Jin Yong (South Korea) Jo Song-hyun	21–19, 21–12	(gold) Winner	

=== BWF Grand Prix (1 title, 2 runners-up) ===
The BWF Grand Prix had two levels, the Grand Prix and Grand Prix Gold. It was a series of badminton tournaments sanctioned by the Badminton World Federation (BWF) and played between 2007 and 2017.

Men's doubles
Year	Tournament	Partner	Opponent	Score	Result	Ref.
2015	New Zealand Open	(Indonesia) Fajar Alfian	(China) Huang Kaixiang (China) Zheng Siwei	21–16, 17–21, 9–21	(silver) Runner-up	
2016	Chinese Taipei Masters	(Indonesia) Fajar Alfian	(Chinese Taipei) Chen Hung-ling (Chinese Taipei) Wang Chi-lin	11–6, 11–6, 11–13, 9–11, 12–10	(gold) Winner	
2017	Bitburger Open	(Indonesia) Fajar Alfian	(Denmark) Kim Astrup (Denmark) Anders Skaarup Rasmussen	19–21, 21–19, 18–21	(silver) Runner-up	

BWF Grand Prix Gold tournament
BWF Grand Prix tournament

=== BWF International Challenge/Series (5 titles) ===
Men's doubles
Year	Tournament	Partner	Opponent	Score	Result	Ref.
2014	Indonesia International	(Indonesia) Fajar Alfian	(Indonesia) Fran Kurniawan (Indonesia) Agripina Prima Rahmanto Putra	9–11, 11–9, 11–9, 11–8	(gold) Winner	
2015	Austrian Open	(Indonesia) Fajar Alfian	(England) Peter Briggs (England) Tom Wolfenden	23–21, 18–21, 21–19	(gold) Winner	
2015	Indonesia International	(Indonesia) Fajar Alfian	(Indonesia) Hantoro (Indonesia) Rian Swastedian	21–12, 17–21, 21–15	(gold) Winner	
2016	Indonesia International	(Indonesia) Fajar Alfian	(Japan) Yoshiki Tsukamoto (Japan) Shunsuke Yamamura	21–12, 21–19	(gold) Winner	
2025	Astana International	(Indonesia) Rahmat Hidayat	(Russia) Rodion Alimov (Russia) Maksim Ogloblin	21–10, 21–14	(gold) Winner	

BWF International Challenge tournament
BWF International Series tournament

=== BWF Junior International (1 runner-up) ===
Boys' doubles
Year	Tournament	Partner	Opponent	Score	Result	Ref.
2013	Indonesia Junior International	(Indonesia) Clinton Hendrik Kudamassa	(Indonesia) Rizko Asuro (Indonesia) Wildan Atmaja	23–25, 18–21	(silver) Runner-up	

BWF Junior International Grand Prix tournament
BWF Junior International Challenge tournament
BWF Junior International Series tournament
BWF Junior Future Series tournament

== Performance timeline ==
Key

W	Won	F	Finalist	SF	Semi-finalist
QF	Quarter-finalist	#R	Rounds 4, 3, 2, 1	RR	Round-robin stage
Q#	Qualification round	A	Absent	w/d	Withdrew
G	Gold	S	Silver	B	Bronze
NH	Not held	N/A	Not applicable	DNQ	Did not qualify

=== National team ===
- Junior level

Team events	2014
Asian Junior Championships	QF
World Junior Championships	S

- Senior level

Team events	2017	2018	2019	2020	2021	2022	2023	2024	2025	2026	Ref
SEA Games	G	NH	G	NH	A	NH	A	NH	A	NH	
Asia Team Championships	NH	A	NH	G	NH	A	NH	A	NH	B	
Asia Mixed Team Championships	A	NH	B	NH			QF	NH	A	NH	
Asian Games	NH	S	NH			QF	NH				
Thomas Cup	NH	B	NH	G	NH	S	NH	S	NH		
Sudirman Cup	A	NH	DNP	NH	QF	NH	QF	NH	B	NH	

=== Individual competitions ===
==== Junior level ====
===== Boys' doubles =====
Events	2014
Asian Junior Championships	QF
World Junior Championships	B

===== Mixed doubles =====
Events	2014
Asian Junior Championships	B
World Junior Championships	S

==== Senior level ====
===== Men's doubles =====
Events	2017	2018	2019	2020	2021	2022	2023	2024	2025	Ref
SEA Games	B	NH	QF	NH	A	NH	A	NH	A	
Asian Championships	2R	2R	2R	NH		B	QF	QF	QF	
Asian Games	NH	S	NH			QF	NH			
World Championships	A	3R	B	NH	w/d	B	2R	NH	3R	
Olympic Games	NH			DNQ	NH			QF	NH	

Tournament	BWF Superseries / Grand Prix				BWF World Tour									Best	Ref
Tournament	2014	2015	2016	2017	2018	2019	2020	2021	2022	2023	2024	2025	2026	Best	Ref
Malaysia Open	A			2R	2R	SF	NH		F	W	QF	1R	A	W ('23)	
India Open	A						NH		A	SF	QF	2R	A	SF ('23)	
Indonesia Masters	2R	2R	1R	NH	2R	QF	SF	1R	W	QF	SF	F	A	W ('22)	
Thailand Masters	NH		A	QF	QF	A		NH		A			SF	SF ('26)	
German Open	A	1R	A		F	A	NH		2R	A				F ('18)	
All England Open	A			1R	1R	SF	2R	w/d	1R	W	W	2R	QF	W ('23, '24)	
Swiss Open	A			QF	A	W	NH	A	W	A			1R	W ('19, '22)	
Orléans Masters	NA				A		NH	A					1R	1R ('26)	
Thailand Open	NH	A	SF	QF	A	2R	2R	NH	F	A		SF	1R	F ('22)	
Thailand Open	NH	A	SF	QF	A	2R	1R	NH	F	A		SF	1R	F ('22)	
Malaysia Masters	A			2R	W	2R	SF	NH	W	1R	A		1R	W ('18, '22)	
Singapore Open	A			2R	A	QF	NH		F	1R	F	QF	A	F ('22, '24)	
Indonesia Open	A		1R	SF	SF	QF	NH	QF	QF	QF	1R	SF	1R	SF ('17, '18, 25)	
Australian Open	A			1R	A	1R	NH		w/d	QF	A			QF ('23)	
Macau Open	A		SF	A			NH				A			SF ('16)	
Japan Open	A			2R	QF	2R	NH		QF	SF	QF	A		SF ('23)	
China Open	A				2R	SF	NH			1R	QF	A		SF ('19)	
Taipei Open	A		QF	A		QF	NH		A				2R	QF ('16, '19)	
Korea Masters	A				1R	A	NH		A					1R ('18)	
China Masters	A		QF	A	1R	2R	NH			2R	2R	1R	A	QF ('16)	
Indonesia Masters Super 100	NH				A	2R	NH		A				1R	W ('26 II)	
Indonesia Masters Super 100	NH				A	2R	NH		A				W	W ('26 II)	
Vietnam Open	A	QF	2R	A			NH		A					QF ('15)	
Arctic Open	N/A						NH			A	QF	A		QF ('24)	
Denmark Open	A				w/d	QF	A	QF	W	SF	SF	QF	A	W ('22)	
French Open	A			QF	w/d	1R	NH	SF	2R	QF	QF	2R	A	SF ('21)	
Hylo Open	A			F	A			QF	A			2R	A	F ('17)	
Korea Open	A			1R	A	W	NH		F	F	A	1R	A	W ('19)	
Japan Masters	NH									w/d	W	A		W ('24)	
Hong Kong Open	A			1R	SF	2R	NH			2R	A	w/d	A	SF ('18)	
Syed Modi International	A			SF	W	A	NH		A					W ('18)	
Odisha Masters	NH								A			QF		QF ('25)	
Superseries / World Tour Finals	DNQ								SF	SF	SF	DNQ		SF ('22, '23, '24)	
Chinese Taipei Masters	NH	1R	W	NH										W ('16)	
New Zealand Open	A	F	2R	A			NH							F ('15)	
Spain Masters	NH				A				NH	QF	A	NH		QF ('23)	
Year-end ranking	112	49	24	17	7	5	6	8	1	6	4	12		1	
Tournament	2014	2015	2016	2017	2018	2019	2020	2021	2022	2023	2024	2025	2026	Best	Ref

===== Mixed doubles =====
Tournament	BWF Superseries / Grand Prix		Best	Ref
Tournament	2014	2015	Best	Ref
Indonesian Masters	1R	A	1R ('14)	
Chinese Taipei Masters	NH	SF	SF ('15)	
Year-end ranking	199	172	149	

== Record against selected opponents ==
Men's doubles results with Fajar Alfian against year-end Finals finalists, World Championships semi-finalists, and Olympic quarter-finalists, accurate as of 24 November 2024.

Players	M	W	L	Diff.
(China) Chai Biao & Hong Wei	1	0	1	–1
(China) Li Junhui & Liu Yuchen	7	3	4	–1
(China) Liang Weikeng & Wang Chang	9	3	6	–3
(China) Liu Cheng & Zhang Nan	3	2	1	+1
(China) He Jiting & Tan Qiang	4	2	2	0
(China) Liu Yuchen & Ou Xuanyi	5	2	3	–1
(Chinese Taipei) Chen Hung-ling & Wang Chi-lin	2	1	1	0
(Chinese Taipei) Lee Yang & Wang Chi-lin	9	6	3	+3
(Denmark) Mathias Boe & Carsten Mogensen	2	0	2	–2
(Denmark) Kim Astrup & Anders Rasmussen	8	3	5	–2
(England) Marcus Ellis & Chris Langridge	3	2	1	+1
(India) Satwiksairaj Rankireddy & Chirag Shetty	6	2	4	–2
(Indonesia) Mohammad Ahsan & Hendra Setiawan	7	4	3	+1
(Indonesia) Marcus Fernaldi Gideon & Kevin Sanjaya Sukamuljo	10	4	6	–2

Players	M	W	L	Diff.
(Japan) Takuro Hoki & Yugo Kobayashi	8	5	3	+2
(Japan) Hiroyuki Endo & Yuta Watanabe	2	1	1	0
(Japan) Takeshi Kamura & Keigo Sonoda	11	5	6	–1
(Malaysia) Aaron Chia & Soh Wooi Yik	8	4	4	0
(Malaysia) Goh Sze Fei & Nur Izzuddin	11	8	3	+5
(Malaysia) Goh V Shem & Tan Wee Kiong	3	3	0	+3
(Malaysia) Ong Yew Sin & Teo Ee Yi	12	7	5	+2
(Russia) Vladimir Ivanov & Ivan Sozonov	3	2	1	+1
(South Korea) Kang Min-hyuk & Seo Seung-jae	9	3	6	–3 (Note: Tournament software did not included the men's team event of the 2022 Asian Games results for head-to-head.)
(South Korea) Ko Sung-hyun & Shin Baek-cheol	4	2	2	0
(South Korea) Lee Yong-dae & Yoo Yeon-seong	1	0	1	–1
(Thailand) Bodin Isara & Maneepong Jongjit	1	1	0	+1
(Thailand) Supak Jomkoh & Kittinupong Kedren	3	3	0	+3
