= Huang Kaixiang =

Chinese badminton player

Huang Kaixiang 黄凯祥
Personal information
- Born: 15 January 1996 (age 30) Nanping, Fujian, China
- Height: 1.75 m (5 ft 9 in)

Sport
- Country: China
- Sport: Badminton
- Handedness: Right

Men's & mixed doubles
- Highest ranking: 35 (MD with Zheng Siwei 8 July 2016); 10 (MD with Wang Yilyu 15 June 2017); 18 (XD 19 November 2015)
- Current ranking: 77 (MD 27 September 2022)
- BWF profile
Medal record
Men's badminton
Representing China
Asian Championships
Silver medal – second place	2017 Wuhan	Men's doubles
Bronze medal – third place	2018 Wuhan	Men's doubles
World Junior Championships
Gold medal – first place	2013 Bangkok	Mixed doubles
Gold medal – first place	2014 Alor Setar	Mixed doubles
Gold medal – first place	2014 Alor Setar	Mixed team
Silver medal – second place	2013 Bangkok	Boys' doubles
Bronze medal – third place	2013 Bangkok	Mixed team
Asian Junior Championships
Gold medal – first place	2013 Kota Kinabalu	Mixed team
Gold medal – first place	2014 Taipei	Boys' doubles
Gold medal – first place	2014 Taipei	Mixed doubles
Gold medal – first place	2014 Taipei	Mixed team
Silver medal – second place	2013 Kota Kinabalu	Boys' doubles
Bronze medal – third place	2013 Kota Kinabalu	Mixed doubles

Huang Kaixiang (Chinese: 黄凯祥; born 15 January 1996) is a Chinese badminton player. He joined the China national badminton team in 2012, as his games at the China Badminton Super League attracted the attention of national-team coach Li Yongbo. At the BWF World Junior Championships, he won two gold medals in the mixed doubles event partnered with Chen Qingchen in 2013 and 2014 and one silver medal in the boys' doubles event partnered with Zheng Siwei in 2013. In the mixed team event he won gold in 2014 and bronze in 2013.

== Achievements ==
=== Asian Championships ===
Men's doubles
Year	Venue	Partner	Opponent	Score	Result
2017	Wuhan Sports Center Gymnasium; Wuhan, China	(China) Wang Yilyu	(China) Li Junhui (China) Liu Yuchen	14–21, 12–21	Silver
2018	Wuhan Sports Center Gymnasium; Wuhan, China	(China) Wang Yilyu	(China) Li Junhui (China) Liu Yuchen	17–21, 21–14, 10–21	Bronze

=== BWF World Junior Championships ===
Boys' doubles
Year	Venue	Partner	Opponent	Score	Result
2013	Hua Mark Indoor Stadium; Bangkok, Thailand	(China) Zheng Siwei	(China) Li Junhui (China) Liu Yuchen	21–14, 13–21, 20–22	Silver

Mixed doubles
Year	Venue	Partner	Opponent	Score	Result
2013	Hua Mark Indoor Stadium; Bangkok, Thailand	(China) Chen Qingchen	(Indonesia) Kevin Sanjaya Sukamuljo (Indonesia) Masita Mahmudin	21–18, 20–22, 23–21	Gold
2014	Stadium Sultan Abdul Halim; Alor Setar, Malaysia	(China) Chen Qingchen	(Indonesia) Muhammad Rian Ardianto (Indonesia) Rosyita Eka Putri Sari	21–12, 21–17	Gold

=== Asian Junior Championships ===
Boys' doubles
Year	Venue	Partner	Opponent	Score	Result
2013	Likas Indoor Stadium; Kota Kinabalu, Malaysia	(China) Zheng Siwei	(China) Li Junhui (China) Liu Yuchen	15–21, 14–21	Silver
2014	Taipei Gymnasium; Taipei, Taiwan	(China) Zheng Siwei	(South Korea) Kim Jae-hwan (South Korea) Kim Jung-ho	21–16, 21–14	Gold

Mixed doubles
Year	Venue	Partner	Opponent	Score	Result
2013	Likas Indoor Stadium; Kota Kinabalu, Malaysia	(China) Chen Qingchen	(South Korea) Choi Sol-gyu (South Korea) Chae Yoo-jung	21–18, 17–21, 16–21	Bronze
2014	Taipei Gymnasium; Taipei, Taiwan	(China) Chen Qingchen	(South Korea) Kim Jung-ho (South Korea) Kong Hee-yong	21–14, 21–13	Gold

=== BWF World Tour (2 runners-up) ===
The BWF World Tour, which was announced on 19 March 2017 and implemented in 2018, is a series of elite badminton tournaments sanctioned by the Badminton World Federation (BWF). The BWF World Tour is divided into levels of World Tour Finals, Super 1000, Super 750, Super 500, Super 300 (part of the HSBC World Tour), and the BWF Tour Super 100.

Men's doubles
Year	Tournament	Level	Partner	Opponent	Score	Result
2019	Macau Open	Super 300	(China) Liu Cheng	(China) Li Junhui (China) Liu Yuchen	8–21, 21–18, 20–22	(silver) Runner-up
2020	Thailand Masters	Super 300	(China) Liu Cheng	(Malaysia) Ong Yew Sin (Malaysia) Teo Ee Yi	21–18, 17–21, 17–21	(silver) Runner-up

=== BWF Grand Prix (5 titles, 4 runners-up) ===
The BWF Grand Prix had two levels, the Grand Prix and Grand Prix Gold. It was a series of badminton tournaments sanctioned by the Badminton World Federation (BWF) and played between 2007 and 2017.

Men's doubles
Year	Tournament	Partner	Opponent	Score	Result
2014	India Grand Prix Gold	(China) Zheng Siwei	(China) Li Junhui (China) Liu Yuchen	17–21, 21–19, 20–22	(silver) Runner-up
2015	New Zealand Open	(China) Zheng Siwei	(Indonesia) Fajar Alfian (Indonesia) Muhammad Rian Ardianto	16–21, 21–17, 21–9	(gold) Winner
2015	Canada Open	(China) Wang Sijie	(China) Li Junhui (China) Liu Yuchen	21–17, 12–21, 18–21	(silver) Runner-up
2015	Vietnam Open	(China) Wang Sijie	(China) Li Junhui (China) Liu Yuchen	8–21, 16–21	(silver) Runner-up
2015	Brasil Open	(China) Zheng Siwei	(China) Wang Yilyu (China) Zhang Wen	22–24, 21–10, 21–14	(gold) Winner
2017	Thailand Masters	(China) Wang Yilyu	(Chinese Taipei) Lu Ching-yao (Chinese Taipei) Yang Po-han	21–19, 21–23, 21–16	(gold) Winner

Mixed doubles
Year	Tournament	Partner	Opponent	Score	Result
2014	India Grand Prix Gold	(China) Chen Qingchen	(China) Wang Yilyu (China) Huang Yaqiong	18–21, 14–21	(silver) Runner-up
2015	U.S. Open	(China) Huang Dongping	(Hong Kong) Lee Chun Hei (Hong Kong) Chau Hoi Wah	21–15, 21–14	(gold) Winner
2015	Vietnam Open	(China) Huang Dongping	(South Korea) Choi Sol-gyu (South Korea) Chae Yoo-jung	21–19, 21–12	(gold) Winner

BWF Grand Prix Gold tournament
BWF Grand Prix tournament
