= Park Kyung-hoon (badminton) =

South Korean badminton player (born 1998)

Personal information
- Born: 12 January 1998 (age 28) Jeonju, South Korea
- Height: 1.80 m (5 ft 11 in)

Sport
- Country: South Korea
- Sport: Badminton
- Handedness: Right

Men's & mixed doubles
- Highest ranking: 206 (MD, 30 March 2017); 277 (XD, 6 April 2017)
- BWF profile
Medal record
Men's badminton
Representing South Korea
Sudirman Cup
Gold medal – first place	2017 Gold Coast	Mixed team
World Junior Championships
Bronze medal – third place	2014 Alor Setar	Mixed doubles
Bronze medal – third place	2016 Bilbao	Mixed doubles
Asia Junior Championships
Silver medal – second place	2014 Taipei	Mixed team
Silver medal – second place	2015 Bangkok	Mixed team

Park Kyung-hoon (Korean: 박경훈; born 12 January 1998) is a South Korean badminton player. In 2017, he helped the Korean national team compete at the 2017 Sudirman Cup and won that tournament.

== Achievements ==
=== BWF World Junior Championships ===
Mixed doubles
Year	Venue	Partner	Opponent	Score	Result
2014	Stadium Sultan Abdul Halim; Alor Setar, Malaysia	(South Korea) Park Keun-hye	(Indonesia) Muhammad Rian Ardianto (Indonesia) Rosyita Eka Putri Sari	13–21, 13–21	Bronze
2016	Bilbao Arena; Bilbao, Spain	(South Korea) Kim Hye-jeong	(China) Zhou Haodong (China) Hu Yuxiang	17–21, 18–21	Bronze

=== BWF International Challenge/Series (2 titles, 1 runner-up) ===
Men's doubles
Year	Tournament	Partner	Opponent	Score	Result
2019	Mongolia International	(South Korea) Kim Won-ho	(South Korea) Kang Min-hyuk (South Korea) Kim Jae-hwan	14–21, 29–27, 21–14	(gold) Winner

Mixed doubles
Year	Tournament	Partner	Opponent	Score	Result
2017	Osaka International	(South Korea) Kong Hee-yong	(China) Wang Sijie (China) Ni Bowen	21–18, 16–21, 12–21	(silver) Runner-up
2023	Thailand International	(South Korea) Kim Yu-jung	(Indonesia) Pulung Ramadhan (Indonesia) Rinjani Kwinnara Nastine	21–17, 21–11	(gold) Winner

BWF International Challenge tournament
BWF International Series tournament
