= Kim Jae-hwan (badminton) =

South Korean badminton player (born 1996)

Personal information
- Born: 13 August 1996 (age 30) Jeongeup, North Jeolla Province, South Korea
- Height: 1.79 m (5 ft 10 in)

Sport
- Country: South Korea
- Sport: Badminton
- Handedness: Right

Men's & mixed doubles
- Highest ranking: 38 (MD 18 February 2020); 46 (XD 16 November 2017)
- Current ranking: 48 (MD 22 February 2022)
- BWF profile
Medal record
Men's badminton
Representing South Korea
Asia Mixed Team Championships
Silver medal – second place	2017 Ho Chi Minh	Mixed team
Asia Team Championships
Bronze medal – third place	2016 Hyderabad	Men's team
Bronze medal – third place	2022 Selangor	Men's team
Summer Universiade
Gold medal – first place	2017 Taipei	Men's doubles
World Junior Championships
Gold medal – first place	2013 Bangkok	Mixed team
Bronze medal – third place	2012 Chiba	Mixed team
Bronze medal – third place	2014 Alor Setar	Boys' doubles
Asian Junior Championships
Silver medal – second place	2013 Kota Kinabalu	Mixed team
Silver medal – second place	2014 Taipei	Boys' doubles
Silver medal – second place	2014 Taipei	Mixed team
Bronze medal – third place	2014 Taipei	Mixed doubles

- Kim Jae-hwan
- Hangul: 김재환
- Hanja: 金宰煥
- RR: Gim Jaehwan
- MR: Kim Chaehwan

Kim Jae-hwan (Korean: 김재환; born 13 August 1996) is a South Korean badminton player. He graduated from the Jeonju Life Science High School, and now educated at the Wonkwang University. In his junior career, he had collected a gold and two bronzes at the World Junior Championships, and also three silvers and a bronze at the Asian Junior Championships. In 2016, he won the men's doubles title with his partnered Choi Sol-gyu at the World University Championships in Russia. At the same year, he won the BWF Grand Prix Gold tournament at the Korea Masters in the men's doubles event with Ko Sung-hyun. In 2017, he competed at the Taipei Summer Universiade and won the men's doubles gold together with Seo Seung-jae.

== Achievements ==
=== Summer Universiade ===
Men's doubles
Year	Venue	Partner	Opponent	Score	Result
2017	Taipei Gymnasium; Taipei, Taiwan	(South Korea) Seo Seung-jae	(Japan) Katsuki Tamate (Japan) Kenya Mitsuhashi	21–12, 21–19	Gold

=== World University Championships ===
Men's doubles
Year	Venue	Partner	Opponent	Score	Result
2016	Sports Palace "Borisoglebskiy"; Ramenskoe, Russia	(South Korea) Choi Sol-gyu	(Chinese Taipei) Lee Jhe-huei (Chinese Taipei) Lee Yang	19–21, 21–14, 21–17	Gold

=== BWF World Junior Championships ===
Boys' doubles
Year	Venue	Partner	Opponent	Score	Result
2014	Stadium Sultan Abdul Halim; Alor Setar, Malaysia	(South Korea) Kim Jung-ho	(Thailand) Kittinupong Kedren (Thailand) Dechapol Puavaranukroh	14–21, 18–21	Bronze

=== Asian Junior Championships ===
Boys' doubles
Year	Venue	Partner	Opponent	Score	Result
2014	Taipei Gymnasium; Taipei, Taiwan	(South Korea) Kim Jung-ho	(China) Huang Kaixiang (China) Zheng Siwei	16–21, 14–21	Silver

Mixed doubles
Year	Venue	Partner	Opponent	Score	Result
2014	Taipei Gymnasium; Taipei, Taiwan	(South Korea) Kim Hye-jeong	(China) Huang Kaixiang (China) Chen Qingchen	9–21, 19–21	Bronze

=== BWF Grand Prix (1 title) ===
The BWF Grand Prix had two levels, the Grand Prix and Grand Prix Gold. It was a series of badminton tournaments sanctioned by the Badminton World Federation (BWF) and played between 2007 and 2017.

Men's doubles
Year	Tournament	Partner	Opponent	Score	Result
2016	Korea Masters	(South Korea) Ko Sung-hyun	(Chinese Taipei) Lee Jhe-huei (Chinese Taipei) Lee Yang	21–19, 21–18	(gold) Winner

BWF Grand Prix Gold tournament
BWF Grand Prix tournament

=== BWF International Challenge/Series (2 titles, 4 runners-up) ===
Men's doubles
Year	Tournament	Partner	Opponent	Score	Result
2019	Osaka International	(South Korea) Kang Min-hyuk	(South Korea) Ko Sung-hyun (South Korea) Shin Baek-cheol	13–21, 16–21	(silver) Runner-up
2019	Vietnam International	(South Korea) Kang Min-hyuk	(Indonesia) Kenas Adi Haryanto (Indonesia) Rian Agung Saputro	19–21, 21–15, 18–21	(silver) Runner-up
2019	Mongolia International	(South Korea) Kang Min-hyuk	(South Korea) Kim Won-ho (South Korea) Park Kyung-hoon	21–14, 27–29, 14–21	(silver) Runner-up
2019	Indonesia International	(South Korea) Kang Min-hyuk	(Indonesia) Muhammad Fachrikar (Indonesia) Amri Syahnawi	21–17, 11–21, 21–15	(gold) Winner
2022	Italian International	(South Korea) Yoon Dae-il	(Chinese Taipei) Su Ching-heng (Chinese Taipei) Ye Hong-wei	21–14, 21–19	(gold) Winner
2023 (II)	Indonesia International	(South Korea) Ki Dong-ju	(Japan) Kenya Mitsuhashi (Japan) Hiroki Okamura	22–20, 16–21, 8–21	(silver) Runner-up

BWF International Challenge tournament
BWF International Series tournament
