= Po Li-wei =

Taiwanese badminton player (born 1997)

Po Li-wei 柏禮維
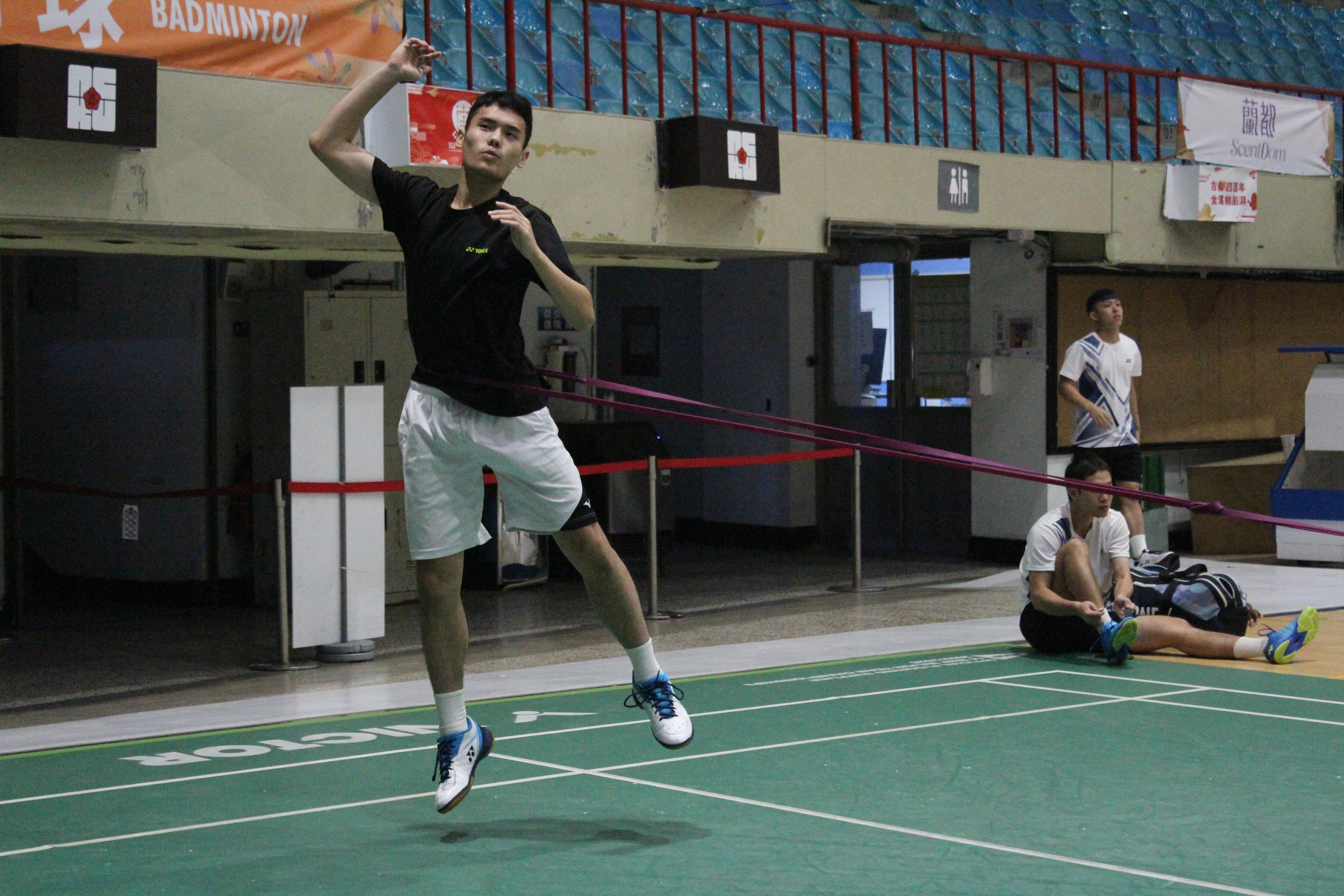

Personal information
- Born: 2 May 1997 (age 29)
- Height: 1.77 m (5 ft 10 in)

Sport
- Country: Republic of China (Taiwan)
- Sport: Badminton
- Handedness: Right

Men's & mixed doubles
- Highest ranking: 27 (MD with Chang Ko-chi, 29 August 2023); 58 (XD with Chang Ching-hui, 18 July 2023)
- Current ranking: 77 (MD with Chang Ko-chi); 238 (XD with Chang Ching-hui) (26 June 2026)
- BWF profile
Medal record
Men's badminton
Representing Chinese Taipei
World University Games
Gold medal – first place	2021 Chengdu	Mixed team
Bronze medal – third place	2021 Chengdu	Men's doubles

Po Li-wei (Chinese: 柏禮維; born 2 May 1997) is a Taiwanese badminton player.

== Achievements ==
=== World University Games ===
Men's doubles
Year	Venue	Partner	Opponent	Score	Result
2021	Shuangliu Sports Centre Gymnasium; Chengdu, China	(Chinese Taipei) Lee Fang-chih	(China) He Jiting (China) Zhou Haodong	24–22, 12–21, 16–21	Bronze

=== BWF World Tour (2 runners-up) ===
The BWF World Tour, which was announced on 19 March 2017 and implemented in 2018, is a series of elite badminton tournaments sanctioned by the Badminton World Federation (BWF). The BWF World Tour is divided into levels of World Tour Finals, Super 1000, Super 750, Super 500, Super 300, and the BWF Tour Super 100.

Men's doubles
Year	Tournament	Level	Partner	Opponent	Score	Result
2018	Korea Masters	Super 300	(Chinese Taipei) Wang Chi-lin	(South Korea) Choi Sol-gyu (South Korea) Seo Seung-jae	12–21, 21–17, 18–21	(silver) Runner-up
2025	Canada Open	Super 300	(Chinese Taipei) Chang Ko-chi	(Chinese Taipei) Lee Fang-chih (Chinese Taipei) Lee Fang-jen	19–21, 19–21	(silver) Runner-up

=== BWF International Challenge/Series (5 titles, 3 runners-up) ===
Men's doubles
Year	Tournament	Partner	Opponent	Score	Result
2014	Auckland International	(Chinese Taipei) Yang Ming-tse	(Netherlands) Ruud Bosch (Chinese Taipei) Tien Tzu-chieh	8–11, 5–11, 11–8, 11–9, 11–6	(gold) Winner
2015	Auckland International	(Chinese Taipei) Yang Ming-tse	(Malaysia) Darren Isaac Devadass (Malaysia) Vountus Indra Mawan	7–21, 12–21	(silver) Runner-up
2022	Belgian International	(Chinese Taipei) Chang Ko-chi	(Thailand) Sirawit Sothon (Thailand) Natthapat Trinkajee	21–11, 19–21, 21–17	(gold) Winner
2022	Bendigo International	(Chinese Taipei) Chang Ko-chi	(Chinese Taipei) Lee Fang-chih (Chinese Taipei) Lee Fang-jen	21–15, 14–21, 22–20	(gold) Winner
2022	North Harbour International	(Chinese Taipei) Chang Ko-chi	(Chinese Taipei) Lee Fang-chih (Chinese Taipei) Lee Fang-jen	10–21, 22–20, 21–13	(gold) Winner
2023	Polish Open	(Chinese Taipei) Chang Ko-chi	(Denmark) Daniel Lundgaard (Denmark) Mads Vestergaard	20–22, 21–16, 19–21	(silver) Runner-up
2023	Saipan International	(Chinese Taipei) Chang Ko-chi	(Chinese Taipei) Lee Fang-chih (Chinese Taipei) Lee Fang-jen	29–30, 20–22	(silver) Runner-up
2024	Bendigo International	(Chinese Taipei) Chen Cheng-kuan	(India) Hariharan Amsakarunan (India) Ruban Kumar	21–17, 21–14	(gold) Winner

BWF International Challenge tournament
BWF International Series tournament
BWF Future Series tournament
