= Yang Ming-tse =

Taiwanese badminton player (born 1997)

Yang Ming-tse 楊明哲
Personal information
- Born: 29 January 1997 (age 29) Taiwan
- Height: 1.77 m (5 ft 10 in)

Sport
- Country: Republic of China (Taiwan)
- Sport: Badminton
- Handedness: Right

Men's & mixed doubles
- Highest ranking: 37 (MD with Chiu Hsiang-chieh, 19 September 2023); 91 (XD with Sung Shuo-yun, 21 June 2018)
- Current ranking: 37 (MD with Chiu Hsiang-chieh) (19 September 2023)
- BWF profile
Medal record
Men's badminton
Representing Chinese Taipei
World Junior Championships
Bronze medal – third place	2015 Lima	Mixed team
Asian Junior Championships
Bronze medal – third place	2014 Taipei	Mixed team

Yang Ming-tse (Chinese: 楊明哲; born 29 January 1997) is a Taiwanese badminton player.

== Achievements ==
=== BWF International Challenge/Series (6 titles, 4 runners-up) ===
Men's doubles
Year	Tournament	Partner	Opponent	Score	Result
2014	Auckland International	(Chinese Taipei) Po Li-wei	(Netherlands) Ruud Bosch (Chinese Taipei) Tien Tzu-chieh	8–11, 5–11, 11–8, 11–9, 11–6	(gold) Winner
2015	Auckland International	(Chinese Taipei) Po Li-wei	(Malaysia) Darren Isaac Devadass (Malaysia) Vountus Indra Mawan	7–21, 12–21	(silver) Runner-up
2022	Denmark Masters	(Chinese Taipei) Chiu Hsiang-chieh	(South Korea) Jin Yong (South Korea) Na Sung-seung	13–21, 16–21	(silver) Runner-up
2022	Bonn International	(Chinese Taipei) Chiu Hsiang-chieh	(Chinese Taipei) Liao Chao-pang (Chinese Taipei) Lin Chia-yu	21–15, 21–14	(gold) Winner
2022	Polish International	(Chinese Taipei) Chiu Hsiang-chieh	(Japan) Masato Takano (Japan) Katsuki Tamate	21–11, 21–15	(gold) Winner
2022	Croatian International	(Chinese Taipei) Chiu Hsiang-chieh	(Chinese Taipei) Chen Yu-che (Chinese Taipei) Lin Bing-wei	21–15, 21–7	(gold) Winner
2022	Bulgarian International	(Chinese Taipei) Chiu Hsiang-chieh	(Chinese Taipei) Chiang Chien-wei (Chinese Taipei) Wu Hsuan-yi	17–21, 21–18, 20–22	(silver) Runner-up
2022	Dutch Open	(Chinese Taipei) Chiu Hsiang-chieh	(England) Callum Hemming (England) Ethan van Leeuwen	21–16, 21–13	(gold) Winner
2022	Czech Open	(Chinese Taipei) Chiu Hsiang-chieh	(Thailand) Pharanyu Kaosamaang (Thailand) Worrapol Thongsa-Nga	15–21, 15–21	(silver) Runner-up

Mixed doubles
Year	Tournament	Partner	Opponent	Score	Result
2016	Sydney International	(Chinese Taipei) Lee Chia-hsin	(South Korea) Jung Young-keun (South Korea) Kim Na-young	21–13, 22–20	(gold) Winner

BWF International Challenge tournament
BWF International Series tournament
BWF Future Series tournament
