= 2017 Badminton Asia Championships =

Badminton championships

Badminton Asia Championships
- 2017

Tournament information
- Location: Wuhan, China
- Dates: April 25–April 30
- Venue: Wuhan Sports Center Gymnasium

The 2017 Badminton Asia Championships was the 36th edition of the Badminton Asia Championships. It was held in Wuhan, China, from April 25 to April 30.

== Venue ==
- This tournament was held at Wuhan Sports Center Gymnasium.

== Medal summary ==
=== Medalists ===
Event	Gold	Silver	Bronze
Men's singles	(China) Chen Long	(China) Lin Dan	(Malaysia) Lee Chong Wei
Men's singles	(China) Chen Long	(China) Lin Dan	(China) Shi Yuqi
Women's singles	(Chinese Taipei) Tai Tzu-ying	(Japan) Akane Yamaguchi	(South Korea) Lee Jang-mi
Women's singles	(Chinese Taipei) Tai Tzu-ying	(Japan) Akane Yamaguchi	(China) He Bingjiao
Men's doubles	(China) Li Junhui (China) Liu Yuchen	(China) Huang Kaixiang (China) Wang Yilu	(Japan) Takeshi Kamura (Japan) Keigo Sonoda
Men's doubles	(China) Li Junhui (China) Liu Yuchen	(China) Huang Kaixiang (China) Wang Yilu	(China) Chai Biao (China) Hong Wei
Women's doubles	(Japan) Misaki Matsutomo (Japan) Ayaka Takahashi	(South Korea) Kim Hye-rin (South Korea) Yoo Hae-won	(South Korea) Chang Ye-na (South Korea) Lee So-hee
Women's doubles	(Japan) Misaki Matsutomo (Japan) Ayaka Takahashi	(South Korea) Kim Hye-rin (South Korea) Yoo Hae-won	(China) Huang Dongping (China) Li Yinhui
Mixed doubles	(China) Lu Kai (China) Huang Yaqiong	(Thailand) Dechapol Puavaranukroh (Thailand) Sapsiree Taerattanachai	(China) Wang Yilu (China) Huang Dongping
Mixed doubles	(China) Lu Kai (China) Huang Yaqiong	(Thailand) Dechapol Puavaranukroh (Thailand) Sapsiree Taerattanachai	(Hong Kong) Lee Chun Hei (Hong Kong) Chau Hoi Wah

=== Medal table ===
Rank	Nation	Gold	Silver	Bronze	Total
1	China (CHN)	3	2	5	10
2	Japan (JPN)	1	1	1	3
3	Chinese Taipei (TPE)	1	0	0	1
4	South Korea (KOR)	0	1	2	3
5	Thailand (THA)	0	1	0	1
6	Hong Kong (HKG)	0	0	1	1
6	Malaysia (MAS)	0	0	1	1
Totals (7 entries)		5	5	10	20

== Men's singles ==
=== Seeds ===
1. (Malaysia) Lee Chong Wei (semifinals)
2. (China) Chen Long (champion)
3. (South Korea) Son Wan-ho (quarterfinals)
4. (China) Lin Dan (final)
5. (China) Tian Houwei (first round)
6. (China) Shi Yuqi (semifinals)
7. (Chinese Taipei) Chou Tien-chen (quarterfinals)
8. (Hong Kong) Ng Ka Long Angus (quarterfinals)

=== Top half ===
First round
1	(Malaysia) Lee C W	21	21
(Japan) K Sakai	19	11
(Indonesia) T Sugiarto	14	9
A1	(Japan) K Nishimoto	21	21
5	(China) Tian HW	18	21	19
(India) A Jayaram	21	18	21
(Hong Kong) Hu Y	13	14
(Chinese Taipei) Hsu J-h	21	21
4	(China) Lin D	21	21
(South Korea) Lee D-k	15	10
(Japan) K Tsuneyama	21	16	21
(Hong Kong) Wong W K	11	21	14
7	(Chinese Taipei) Chou T-c	21	21
D1	(Sri Lanka) N Karunaratne	19	16
(Indonesia) I M Mustofa	21	16	21
(Malaysia) Z Zulkiffli	14	21	15

Second round
1	(Malaysia) Lee C W	22	21
A1	(Japan) K Nishimoto	20	12
(India) A Jayaram	19	10
(Chinese Taipei) Hsu J-h	21	21
4	(China) Lin D	21	21
(Japan) K Tsuneyama	17	15
7	(Chinese Taipei) Chou T-c	21	17	21
(Indonesia) I M Mustofa	16	21	13

Quarterfinals
1	(Malaysia) Lee C W	21	21
(Chinese Taipei) Hsu J-h	18	13
4	(China) Lin D	21	21
7	(Chinese Taipei) Chou T-c	14	12

Semifinals
1	(Malaysia) Lee C W	13	15
4	(China) Lin D	21	21

=== Bottom half ===
First round
PFQ	(Thailand) K Phetpradab	21	21
(Chinese Taipei) Wang T-w	16	14
(Hong Kong) Wei N	17	11
6	(China) Shi YQ	21	21
(Thailand) T Saensomboonsuk	21	16	21
C1	(Singapore) Ng Z R	13	21	14
PFQ	(Vietnam) Nguyen T M	16	9
3	(South Korea) Son W-h	21	21
(Malaysia) Chong W F	16	21	21
(Chinese Taipei) Lin Y-h	21	14	13
(India) H. S. Prannoy	16	21	19
8	(Hong Kong) Ng K L	21	13	21
(Indonesia) A S Ginting	13	21	17
(Japan) T Ueda	21	10	21
B1	(Philippines) R L Pedrosa	11	4
2	(China) Chen L	21	21

Second round
PFQ	(Thailand) K Phetpradab	10	7
6	(China) Shi YQ	21	21
(Thailand) T Saensomboonsuk	7	10
3	(South Korea) Son W-h	21	21
(Malaysia) Chong W F	18	9
8	(Hong Kong) Ng K L	21	21
(Japan) T Ueda	11	14
2	(China) Chen L	21	21

Quarterfinals
6	(China) Shi YQ	21	21
3	(South Korea) Son W-h	16	15
8	(Hong Kong) Ng K L	17	13
2	(China) Chen L	21	21

Semifinals
6	(China) Shi YQ	19	15
2	(China) Chen L	21	21

=== Finals ===
Semifinals
1	(Malaysia) Lee Chong Wei	13	15
4	(China) Lin Dan	21	21
6	(China) Shi Yuqi	19	15
2	(China) Chen Long	21	21

Final
4	(China) Lin Dan	23	11	10
2	(China) Chen Long	21	21	21

== Women's singles ==
=== Seeds ===
1. (Chinese Taipei) Tai Tzu-ying (champion)
2. (Japan) Akane Yamaguchi (final)
3. (South Korea) Sung Ji-hyun (second round)
4. (India) P. V. Sindhu (quarterfinals)
5. (China) Sun Yu (second round)
6. (Thailand) Ratchanok Intanon (quarterfinals)
7. (India) Saina Nehwal (first round)
8. (China) He Bingjiao (semifinals)

=== Top half ===
First round
1	(Chinese Taipei) Tai T-y	21	21
D1	(Vietnam) Nguyen T L	10	8
(Vietnam) Vu T T	21	21
(Indonesia) Fitriani	13	8
7	(India) S Nehwal	21	16	18
(Japan) S Sato	19	21	21
(China) Chen YF	21	21
(Thailand) B Ongbamrungphan	13	13
3	(South Korea) Sung J-h	21	21
(Indonesia) H Ramadhini	5	9
(Thailand) N Jindapol	21	21
(Chinese Taipei) Pai Y-p	17	19
5	(China) Sun Y	21	9	21
(Hong Kong) Cheung N Y	19	21	18
(Japan) N Okuhara	14	16
B1	(South Korea) Lee J-m	21	21

Second round
1	(Chinese Taipei) Tai T-y	21	21
(Vietnam) Vu T T	10	14
(Japan) S Sato	21	10	9
(China) Chen YF	19	21	21
3	(South Korea) Sung J-h	16	18
(Thailand) N Jindapol	21	21
5	(China) Sun Y	16	21	19
B1	(South Korea) Lee J-m	21	11	21

Quarterfinals
1	(Chinese Taipei) Tai T-y	21	21
(China) Chen YF	11	7
(Thailand) N Jindapol	19	9
B1	(South Korea) Lee J-m	21	21

Semifinals
1	(Chinese Taipei) Tai T-y	21	21
B1	(South Korea) Lee J-m	8	16

=== Bottom half ===
First round
(Thailand) P Chochuwong	21	21
(Chinese Taipei) Chiang M-h	11	16
(South Korea) Kim H-m	21	15	14
8	(China) He BJ	17	21	21
(Japan) A Ohori	21	21
C1	(Philippines) S J Barredo	13	3
(Indonesia) D D Ayustine	8	18
4	(India) P. V. Sindhu	21	21
PFQ	(Malaysia) S Cheah	21	21
A1	(Iran) S Aghaei	10	7
(China) Chen XX	18	17
6	(Thailand) R Intanon	21	21
(Hong Kong) Yip P Y	7	16
(Chinese Taipei) Hsu Y-c	21	21
(Malaysia) Goh J W	17	18
2	(Japan) A Yamaguchi	21	21

Second round
(Thailand) P Chochuwong	13	16
8	(China) He BJ	21	21
(Japan) A Ohori	14	15
4	(India) P. V. Sindhu	21	21
PFQ	(Malaysia) S Cheah	18	7
6	(Thailand) R Intanon	21	21
(Chinese Taipei) Hsu Y-c	18	20
2	(Japan) A Yamaguchi	21	22

Quarterfinals
8	(China) He BJ	15	21	24
4	(India) P. V. Sindhu	21	14	22
6	(Thailand) R Intanon	16	19
2	(Japan) A Yamaguchi	21	21

Semifinals
8	(China) He BJ	15	19
2	(Japan) A Yamaguchi	21	21

=== Finals ===
Semifinals
1	(Chinese Taipei) Tai Tzu-ying	21	21
B1	(South Korea) Lee Jang-mi	8	16
8	(China) He Bingjiao	15	19
2	(Japan) Akane Yamaguchi	21	21

Final
1	(Chinese Taipei) Tai Tzu-ying	18	21	21
2	(Japan) Akane Yamaguchi	21	11	18

== Men's doubles ==
=== Seeds ===
1. (Indonesia) Marcus Fernaldi Gideon / Kevin Sanjaya Sukamuljo (withdrew)
2. (Malaysia) Goh V Shem / Tan Wee Kiong (second round)
3. (China) Chai Biao / Hong Wei (semifinals)
4. (Japan) Takeshi Kamura / Keigo Sonoda (semifinals)
5. (China) Fu Haifeng / Zhang Nan (quarterfinals)
6. (China) Li Junhui / Liu Yuchen (champion)
7. (Indonesia) Angga Pratama / Ricky Karanda Suwardi (second round)
8. (Chinese Taipei) Lee Jhe-huei / Lee Yang (first round)

=== Top half ===
First round
PFQ	(Thailand) T Isriyanet (Thailand) K Namdash	16	12
(Chinese Taipei) Chen H-l (Chinese Taipei) Wang C-l	21	21
(Hong Kong) Law C H (Hong Kong) Lee C H	10	10
(Japan) H Endo (Japan) Y Watanabe	21	21
6	(China) Li JH (China) Liu YC	21	21
(Thailand) B Issara (Thailand) N Puangpuapech	6	16
(Malaysia) Ong Y S (Malaysia) Teo E Y	21	21
B1	(Sri Lanka) S Dias (Sri Lanka) B Goonathileka	12	13
4	(Japan) T Kamura (Japan) K Sonoda	21	21
A1	(Nepal) D Dhami (Nepal) R Tamang	10	4
(Indonesia) F Alfian (Indonesia) M R Ardianto	21	21
(Singapore) Hee Y K (Singapore) Loh K H	11	15
5	(China) Fu HF (China) Zhang N	21	21
(India) M Attri (India) B. S Reddy	9	18
(Chinese Taipei) Lu C-y (Chinese Taipei) Yang P-h	24	20	21
(Malaysia) Goh S F (Malaysia) N Izzuddin	22	22	19

Second round
(Chinese Taipei) Chen H-l (Chinese Taipei) Wang C-l	21	21
(Japan) H Endo (Japan) Y Watanabe	19	17
6	(China) Li JH (China) Liu YC	13	21	21
(Malaysia) Ong Y S (Malaysia) Teo E Y	21	17	15
4	(Japan) T Kamura (Japan) K Sonoda	21	21
(Indonesia) F Alfian (Indonesia) M R Ardianto	17	18
5	(China) Fu HF (China) Zhang N	21	21
(Chinese Taipei) Lu C-y (Chinese Taipei) Yang P-h	13	19

Quarterfinals
(Chinese Taipei) Chen H-l (Chinese Taipei) Wang C-l	12	11
6	(China) Li JH (China) Liu YC	21	21
4	(Japan) T Kamura (Japan) K Sonoda	w	/	o
5	(China) Fu HF (China) Zhang N

Semifinals
6	(China) Li JH (China) Liu YC	21	13	21
4	(Japan) T Kamura (Japan) K Sonoda	15	21	18

=== Bottom half ===
First round
(Singapore) D B Chrisnanta (Singapore) H Wijaya	13	12
(Japan) T Inoue (Japan) Y Kaneko	21	21
(Thailand) K Kedren (Thailand) D Puavaranukroh	21	21
8	(Chinese Taipei) Lee J-h (Chinese Taipei) Lee Y	19	19
D1	(Vietnam) Do T D (Vietnam) Pham H N	14	15
(Indonesia) M Ahsan (Indonesia) R A Saputro	21	21
(Hong Kong) Or C C (Hong Kong) Tang C M	15	21	17
3	(China) Chai B (China) Hong W	21	17	21
(South Korea) Chung E-s (South Korea) Kim D-y	14	22	10
(Japan) T Hoki (Japan) Y Kobayashi	21	20	21
(Thailand) T Potieng (Thailand) N Yordphaisong	11	15
7	(Indonesia) A Pratama (Indonesia) R K Suwardi	21	21
(China) Huang KX (China) Wang YL	21	21
C1	(Hong Kong) Ho W L (Hong Kong) Tam C H	16	17
(Chinese Taipei) Liao K-h (Chinese Taipei) Lu C-p	15	21	16
2	(Malaysia) Goh V S (Malaysia) Tan W K	21	13	21

Second round
(Japan) T Inoue (Japan) Y Kaneko	19	21	28
(Thailand) K Kedren (Thailand) D Puavaranukroh	21	18	30
(Indonesia) M Ahsan (Indonesia) R A Saputro	17	21	19
3	(China) Chai B (China) Hong W	21	19	21
(Japan) T Hoki (Japan) Y Kobayashi	21	21
7	(Indonesia) A Pratama (Indonesia) R K Suwardi	15	15
(China) Huang KX (China) Wang YL	21	21
2	(Malaysia) Goh V S (Malaysia) Tan W K	19	16

Quarterfinals
(Thailand) K Kedren (Thailand) D Puavaranukroh	18	15
3	(China) Chai B (China) Hong W	21	21
(Japan) T Hoki (Japan) Y Kobayashi	20	27
(China) Huang KX (China) Wang YL	22	29

Semifinals
3	(China) Chai B (China) Hong W	16	19
(China) Huang KX (China) Wang YL	21	21

=== Finals ===
Semifinals
6	(China) Li Junhui (China) Liu Yuchen	21	13	21
4	(Japan) Takeshi Kamura (Japan) Keigo Sonoda	15	21	18
3	(China) Chai Biao (China) Hong Wei	16	19
(China) Huang Kaixiang (China) Wang Yilu	21	21

Final
6	(China) Li Junhui (China) Liu Yuchen	21	21
(China) Huang Kaixiang (China) Wang Yilu	14	12

== Women's doubles ==
=== Seeds ===
1. (Japan) Misaki Matsutomo / Ayaka Takahashi (champion)
2. (South Korea) Jung Kyung-eun / Shin Seung-chan (quarterfinals)
3. (South Korea) Chang Ye-na / Lee So-hee (semifinals)
4. (China) Chen Qingchen / Jia Yifan (quarterfinals)
5. (China) Luo Ying / Luo Yu (quarterfinals)
6. (Japan) Naoko Fukuman / Kurumi Yonao (first round)
7. (Thailand) Puttita Supajirakul / Sapsiree Taerattanachai (first round)
8. (Thailand) Jongkolphan Kititharakul / Rawinda Prajongjai (second round)

=== Top half ===
First round
1	(Japan) M Matsutomo (Japan) A Takahashi	21	21
D1	(Singapore) Ong R N (Singapore) Wong J Y	12	8
(India) A Ponnappa (India) N. S Reddy	20	16
(South Korea) Chae Y-j (South Korea) Kim S-y	22	21
7	(Thailand) P Supajirakul (Thailand) S Taerattanachai	21	18	19
(Malaysia) Vivian Hoo K M (Malaysia) Woon K W	13	21	21
(Indonesia) N P Lestari (Indonesia) M C Sahputri	17	15
(China) Huang YQ (China) Tang JH	21	21
3	(South Korea) Chang Y-n (South Korea) Lee S-h	21	21
PFQ	(Hong Kong) Ng T Y (Hong Kong) Yeung N T	14	8
(Japan) S Tanaka (Japan) K Yonemoto	21	21
(Vietnam) Nguyen T S (Vietnam) Vu T T	13	16
5	(China) Luo Y (China) Luo Y	21	21
(Chinese Taipei) Hsu Y-c (Chinese Taipei) Wu T-j	14	10
(Malaysia) Lim Y L (Malaysia) Yap C W	12	21	18
C1	(Hong Kong) Ng W Y (Hong Kong) Yuen S Y	21	14	21

Second round
1	(Japan) M Matsutomo (Japan) A Takahashi	21	21
(South Korea) Chae Y-j (South Korea) Kim S-y	14	15
(Malaysia) Vivian Hoo K M (Malaysia) Woon K W	16	21	21
(China) Huang YQ (China) Tang JH	21	14	16
3	(South Korea) Chang Y-n (South Korea) Lee S-h	21	21
(Japan) S Tanaka (Japan) K Yonemoto	16	18
5	(China) Luo Y (China) Luo Y	22	21
C1	(Hong Kong) Ng W Y (Hong Kong) Yuen S Y	20	12

Quarterfinals
1	(Japan) M Matsutomo (Japan) A Takahashi	21	21
(Malaysia) Vivian Hoo K M (Malaysia) Woon K W	16	10
3	(South Korea) Chang Y-n (South Korea) Lee S-h	21	18	24
5	(China) Luo Y (China) Luo Y	13	21	22

Semifinals
1	(Japan) M Matsutomo (Japan) A Takahashi	21	21
3	(South Korea) Chang Y-n (South Korea) Lee S-h	14	10

=== Bottom half ===
First round
(Indonesia) T R Nuraidah (Indonesia) R A Pradipta	17	17
(South Korea) Kim H-r (South Korea) Yoo H-w	21	21
(Chinese Taipei) Chiang K-h (Chinese Taipei) Hung S-h	16	15
8	(Thailand) J Kititharakul (Thailand) R Prajongjai	21	21
(Hong Kong) Poon L Y (Hong Kong) Tse Y S	21	21
A1	(Sri Lanka) A Ratnasiri (Sri Lanka) U S Weerasinghe	11	13
(Japan) Y Fukushima (Japan) S Hirota	18	14
4	(China) Chen QC (China) Jia YF	21	21
(China) Huang DP (China) Li YH	21	21
(Malaysia) Chow M K (Malaysia) Lee M Y	9	16
B1	(Chinese Taipei) Cheng Y-c (Chinese Taipei) Hu L-f	w	/	o
6	(Japan) N Fukuman (Japan) K Yonao
(Indonesia) D D Haris (Indonesia) R E Putri Sari	21	21
(Chinese Taipei) Lin X-m (Chinese Taipei) Wu F-c	11	14
(India) M Jakkampudi (India) P S Ram	11	16
2	(South Korea) Jung K-e (South Korea) Shin S-c	21	21

Second round
(South Korea) Kim H-r (South Korea) Yoo H-w	21	21
8	(Thailand) J Kititharakul (Thailand) R Prajongjai	18	17
(Hong Kong) Poon L Y (Hong Kong) Tse Y S	11	19
4	(China) Chen QC (China) Jia YF	21	21
(China) Huang DP (China) Li YH	21	21
B1	(Chinese Taipei) Cheng Y-c (Chinese Taipei) Hu L-f	11	18
(Indonesia) D D Haris (Indonesia) R E Putri Sari	16	17
2	(South Korea) Jung K-e (South Korea) Shin S-c	21	21

Quarterfinals
(South Korea) Kim H-r (South Korea) Yoo H-w	21	21
4	(China) Chen QC (China) Jia YF	16	16
(China) Huang DP (China) Li YH	20	21	21
2	(South Korea) Jung K-e (South Korea) Shin S-c	22	13	18

Semifinals
(South Korea) Kim H-r (South Korea) Yoo H-w	21	21
(China) Huang DP (China) Li YH	13	17

=== Finals ===
Semifinals
1	(Japan) Misaki Matsutomo (Japan) Ayaka Takahashi	21	21
3	(South Korea) Chang Ye-na (South Korea) Lee So-hee	14	10
(South Korea) Kim Hye-rin (South Korea) Yoo Hae-won	21	21
(China) Huang Dongping (China) Li Yinhui	13	17

Final
1	(Japan) Misaki Matsutomo (Japan) Ayaka Takahashi	21	16	21
(South Korea) Kim Hye-rin (South Korea) Yoo Hae-won	19	21	10

== Mixed doubles ==
=== Seeds ===
1. (China) Zheng Siwei / Chen Qingchen (quarterfinals)
2. (Indonesia) Tontowi Ahmad / Liliyana Natsir (withdrew)
3. (China) Lu Kai / Huang Yaqiong (champion)
4. (Malaysia) Chan Peng Soon / Goh Liu Ying (withdrew)
5. (Indonesia) Praveen Jordan / Debby Susanto (quarterfinals)
6. (Malaysia) Tan Kian Meng / Lai Pei Jing (quarterfinals)
7. (China) Zhang Nan / Li Yinhui (quarterfinals)
8. (Thailand) Dechapol Puavaranukroh / Sapsiree Taerattanachai (final)

=== Top half ===
First round
1	(China) Zheng SW (China) Chen QC	21	14	21
(India) P J Chopra (India) N. S Reddy	15	21	16
(Hong Kong) Tang C M (Hong Kong) Tse Y S	21	21
B1	(Jordan) B A Alshannik (Jordan) D Amro	8	15
8	(Thailand) D Puavaranukroh (Thailand) S Taerattanachai	21	23
(Indonesia) R Alexander (Indonesia) M D Oktavianti	18	21
(Chinese Taipei) Liao M-c (Chinese Taipei) Chen H-h	21	21
(Japan) Y Watanabe (Japan) A Higashino	16	18
PFQ	(Philippines) A Morada (Philippines) A Y Leonardo	11	9
(Chinese Taipei) Lin C-y (Chinese Taipei) Wu T-j	21	21
(Japan) T Takashina (Japan) R Eto	9	18
(China) Wang YL (China) Huang DP	21	21
5	(Indonesia) P Jordan (Indonesia) D Susanto	21	21
C1	(Vietnam) Pham H N (Vietnam) Le T H	11	16
(South Korea) Choi S-g (South Korea) Chae Y-j	26	18	21
(Thailand) N Puangpuapech (Thailand) J Kititharakul	24	21	18

Second round
1	(China) Zheng SW (China) Chen QC	21	21
(Hong Kong) Tang C M (Hong Kong) Tse Y S	19	15
8	(Thailand) D Puavaranukroh (Thailand) S Taerattanachai	21	21
(Chinese Taipei) Liao M-c (Chinese Taipei) Chen H-h	12	18
(Chinese Taipei) Lin C-y (Chinese Taipei) Wu T-j	18	13
(China) Wang YL (China) Huang DP	21	21
5	(Indonesia) P Jordan (Indonesia) D Susanto	21	21
(South Korea) Choi S-g (South Korea) Chae Y-j	12	13

Quarterfinals
1	(China) Zheng SW (China) Chen QC	19	17
8	(Thailand) D Puavaranukroh (Thailand) S Taerattanachai	21	21
(China) Wang YL (China) Huang DP	24	21
5	(Indonesia) P Jordan (Indonesia) D Susanto	22	19

Semifinals
8	(Thailand) D Puavaranukroh (Thailand) S Taerattanachai	21	21
(China) Wang YL (China) Huang DP	19	16

=== Bottom half ===
First round
(Japan) K Kazuno (Japan) A Kurihara	25	21
(Hong Kong) Tam C H (Hong Kong) Ng T Y	23	17
PFQ	(Thailand) T Isriyanet (Thailand) P Chocuwong	12	17
6	(Malaysia) Tan K M (Malaysia) Lai P J	21	21
D1	(Singapore) D B Chrisnanta (Singapore) Wong J Y	10	21	21
(Indonesia) A E Prasetya (Indonesia) A Saufika	21	18	16
(Singapore) Hee Y K (Singapore) Tan W H	13	9
3	(China) Lu K (China) Huang YQ	21	21
(Malaysia) Goh S H (Malaysia) S J Lai	18	18
(Thailand) B Issara (Thailand) S Amitrapai	21	21
(Vietnam) Do T D (Vietnam) Pham N T	7	20
7	(China) Zhang N (China) Li YH	21	22
(Hong Kong) Lee C H (Hong Kong) Chau H W	21	21
(Chinese Taipei) Chang K-c (Chinese Taipei) Chang H-t	15	14
A1	(Sri Lanka) S Dias (Sri Lanka) T P Hendahewa	12	9
PFQ	(Chinese Taipei) Lee Y (Chinese Taipei) Hsu Y-c	21	21

Second round
(Japan) K Kazuno (Japan) A Kurihara	11	8
6	(Malaysia) Tan K M (Malaysia) Lai P J	21	21
D1	(Singapore) D B Chrisnanta (Singapore) Wong J Y	10	10
3	(China) Lu K (China) Huang YQ	21	21
(Thailand) B Issara (Thailand) S Amitrapai	14	12
7	(China) Zhang N (China) Li YH	21	21
(Hong Kong) Lee C H (Hong Kong) Chau H W	21	21
PFQ	(Chinese Taipei) Lee Y (Chinese Taipei) Hsu Y-c	16	19

Quarterfinals
6	(Malaysia) Tan K M (Malaysia) Lai P J	11	19
3	(China) Lu K (China) Huang YQ	21	21
7	(China) Zhang N (China) Li YH
(Hong Kong) Lee C H (Hong Kong) Chau H W	w	/	o

Semifinals
3	(China) Lu K (China) Huang YQ	21	21
(Hong Kong) Lee C H (Hong Kong) Chau H W	10	19

=== Finals ===
Semifinals
8	(Thailand) Dechapol Puavaranukroh (Thailand) Sapsiree Taerattanachai	21	21
(China) Wang Yilu (China) Huang Dongping	19	16
3	(China) Lu Kai (China) Huang Yaqiong	21	21
(Hong Kong) Lee Chun Hei (Hong Kong) Chau Hoi Wah	10	19

Final
8	(Thailand) Dechapol Puavaranukroh (Thailand) Sapsiree Taerattanachai	18	11
3	(China) Lu Kai (China) Huang Yaqiong	21	21
