= 2017 Korea Masters Grand Prix Gold =

Tournament details
- Dates: 28 November – 3 December
- Level: Grand Prix Gold
- Total prize money: US$120,000
- Venue: Yeomju Gymnasium
- Location: Gwangju, South Korea

Champions
- Men's singles: (South Korea) Jeon Hyeok-jin
- Women's singles: (China) Gao Fangjie
- Men's doubles: (South Korea) Kim Won-ho (South Korea) Seo Seung-jae
- Women's doubles: (South Korea) Lee So-hee (South Korea) Shin Seung-chan
- Mixed doubles: (South Korea) Seo Seung-jae (South Korea) Kim Ha-na

The 2017 Korea Masters Grand Prix Gold was a badminton tournament which took place at Yeomju Gymnasium in South Korea from 28 November to 3 December 2017 and had a total purse of $120,000.

== Tournament ==
The 2017 Korea Masters Grand Prix Gold was the eighteenth Grand Prix's badminton tournament of the 2017 BWF Grand Prix Gold and Grand Prix and also part of the Korea Masters championships which had been held since 2007. This tournament was organized by the Badminton Korea Association, with the sanction from the BWF.

=== Venue ===
This international tournament was held at Yeomju Gymnasium in Gwangju, South Korea.

=== Point distribution ===
Below is the tables with the point distribution for each phase of the tournament based on the BWF points system for the Grand Prix Gold event.

Winner	Runner-up	3/4	5/8	9/16	17/32	33/64	65/128	129/256	257/512	513/1024
7,000	5,950	4,900	3,850	2,750	1,670	660	320	130	60	30

=== Prize money ===
The total prize money for this tournament was US$120,000. Distribution of prize money was in accordance with BWF regulations.

Event	Winner	Finals	Semifinals	Quarterfinals	Last 16
Singles	$9,000	$4,560	$1,740	$720	$420
Doubles	$9,480	$4,560	$1,680	$870	$450

== Men's singles ==
=== Seeds ===
1. (South Korea) Son Wan-ho (third round)
2. (Chinese Taipei) Wang Tzu-wei (first round)
3. (Thailand) Tanongsak Saensomboonsuk (second round)
4. (South Korea) Jeon Hyeok-jin (champion)
5. (France) Brice Leverdez (quarterfinals)
6. (Chinese Taipei) Hsu Jen-hao (second round)
7. (Thailand) Khosit Phetpradab (semifinals)
8. (China) Zhao Junpeng (withdrew)
9. (Malaysia) Chong Wei Feng (third round)
10. (India) Kashyap Parupalli (withdrew)
11. (South Korea) Lee Dong-keun (semifinals)
12. (Malaysia) Zulfadli Zulkiffli (withdrew)
13. (Thailand) Suppanyu Avihingsanon (first round)
14. (Malaysia) Lee Zii Jia (withdrew)
15. (Thailand) Pannawit Thongnuam (second round)
16. (Indonesia) Ihsan Maulana Mustofa (third round)

=== Finals ===
Quarterfinals
(South Korea) Kim Min-ki	21	21
(Chinese Taipei) Lee Chia-hao	18	14
(Indonesia) Panji Ahmad Maulana	21	19	11
11	(South Korea) Lee Dong-keun	16	21	21
5	(France) Brice Leverdez	9	12
4	(South Korea) Jeon Hyeok-jin	21	21
7	(Thailand) Khosit Phetpradab	21	21
(Thailand) Kantaphon Wangcharoen	11	7

Semifinals
(South Korea) Kim Min-ki	21	21
11	(South Korea) Lee Dong-keun	19	15
4	(South Korea) Jeon Hyeok-jin	21	21
7	(Thailand) Khosit Phetpradab	16	14

Final
(South Korea) Kim Min-ki	17	21	12
4	(South Korea) Jeon Hyeok-jin	21	19	21

=== Top half ===
==== Section 1 ====
First round
1	(South Korea) Son W-h	21	21
(Chinese Taipei) Hsueh H-y	19	12
(New Zealand) A Rouse	8	17
(South Korea) Heo K-h	21	21
13	(Thailand) S Avihingsanon	9	15
(China) Bai YP	21	21
(South Korea) Kim M-k	21	15	21
(Chinese Taipei) Liu W-c	16	21	12

Second round
1	(South Korea) Son W-h	21	21
(South Korea) Heo K-h	10	14
(China) Bai YP	15	21	18
(South Korea) Kim M-k	21	18	21

Third round
1	(South Korea) Son W-h	12	12
(South Korea) Kim M-k	21	21

==== Section 2 ====
First round
PFQ	(South Korea) Ko G-b	21	21
Q3	(South Korea) Kim D-w	8	16
(Czech Republic) M Ludík	13	18
(Malaysia) Soong J V	21	21
PFQ	(South Korea) Noh J-h	13	17
(Chinese Taipei) Lee C-h	21	21
Q5	(South Korea) Lee Y-k	19	21	21
Q4	(South Korea) Choi H-b	21	16	15

Second round
PFQ	(South Korea) Ko G-b	9	13
(Malaysia) Soong J V	21	21
(Chinese Taipei) Lee C-h	21	21
Q5	(South Korea) Lee Y-k	10	12

Third round
(Malaysia) Soong J V	16	15
(Chinese Taipei) Lee C-h	21	21

==== Section 3 ====
First round
3	(Thailand) T Saensomboonsuk	21	21
(Russia) P Kotsarenko	13	17
(Indonesia) P A Maulana	21	23	21
Q6	(South Korea) Jang H-s	17	25	18
PFQ	(Chinese Taipei) Liang H-c	21	21
(Australia) P S Low	9	14
(Chinese Taipei) Lin C-h	21	10	21
(Malaysia) I Z Zainuddin	17	21	18

Second round
3	(Thailand) T Saensomboonsuk	14	13
(Indonesia) P A Maulana	21	21
PFQ	(Chinese Taipei) Liang H-c	16	8
(Chinese Taipei) Lin C-h	21	21

Third round
(Indonesia) P A Maulana	20	21	21
(Chinese Taipei) Lin C-h	22	8	19

==== Section 4 ====
First round
6	(Chinese Taipei) Hsu J-h	21	21
(Indonesia) Y F Mainaky	11	10
(Indonesia) F A Kholik	21	21
(Malaysia) Adam Lau Y M	16	17
11	(South Korea) Lee D-k	21	21
(Malaysia) Liew D	9	18
(South Korea) Woo S-h	21	21
(Uganda) E Ekiring	7	4

Second round
6	(Chinese Taipei) Hsu J-h	15	13
(Indonesia) F A Kholik	21	21
11	(South Korea) Lee D-k	21	21
(South Korea) Woo S-h	15	12

Third round
(Indonesia) F A Kholik	17	23	17
11	(South Korea) Lee D-k	21	21	21

=== Bottom half ===
==== Section 5 ====
First round
(South Korea) Ha Y-w	21	21
(India) K G Kumar	13	16
(Chinese Taipei) Kan C-y	6	9
15	(Thailand) P Thongnuam	21	21
(South Korea) Yim J-w	21	19	21
PFQ	(South Korea) Um J-k	14	21	5
(England) K H Tang	5	7
5	(France) B Leverdez	21	21

Second round
(South Korea) Ha Y-w	21	21
15	(Thailand) P Thongnuam	9	9
(South Korea) Yim J-w	9	19
5	(France) B Leverdez	21	21

Third round
(South Korea) Ha Y-w	21	13	20
5	(France) B Leverdez	16	21	22

==== Section 6 ====
First round
(Australia) A Joe	17	4
(Thailand) A Namkul	21	21
(Chinese Taipei) Lu C-h	19	21	16
16	(Indonesia) I M Mustofa	21	17	21
(South Korea) Park S-m	12	14
Q7	(South Korea) Hong J-h	21	21
(Chinese Taipei) Chang E-c	9	20
4	(South Korea) Jeon H-j	21	22

Second round
(Thailand) A Namkul	15	15
16	(Indonesia) I M Mustofa	21	21
Q7	(South Korea) Hong J-h	19	22
4	(South Korea) Jeon H-j	21	24

Third round
16	(Indonesia) I M Mustofa	12	15
4	(South Korea) Jeon H-j	21	21

==== Section 7 ====
First round
(China) Zhou ZQ	21	21
(Russia) S Sirant	9	15
Q8	(South Korea) Kim Y-h	21	14	13
9	(Malaysia) Chong W F	15	21	21
(China) Ren PB	21	21
(Malaysia) Alfred Lau Y L	12	14
(Chinese Taipei) Chen C-w	12	20
7	(Thailand) K Phetpradab	21	22

Second round
(China) Zhou ZQ	14	15
9	(Malaysia) Chong W F	21	21
(China) Ren PB	21	9	13
7	(Thailand) K Phetpradab	10	21	21

Third round
9	(Malaysia) Chong W F	17	10
7	(Thailand) K Phetpradab	21	21

==== Section 8 ====
First round
Q2	(South Korea) Ko J-h	25	14	16
(China) Lu GZ	23	21	21
Q1	(South Korea) Lee H-d	16	2
PFQ	(South Korea) Rho Y-w	21	1^{r}
(Malaysia) Tan J W	16	17
(South Korea) Hwang J-s	21	21
(Thailand) K Wangcharoen	21	10	21
2	(Chinese Taipei) Wang T-w	19	21	16

Second round
(China) Lu GZ	21	21
Q1	(South Korea) Lee H-d	15	13
(South Korea) Hwang J-s	22	19	16
(Thailand) K Wangcharoen	20	21	21

Third round
(China) Lu GZ	17	14
(Thailand) K Wangcharoen	21	21

== Women's singles ==
=== Seeds ===
1. (South Korea) Sung Ji-hyun (quarterfinals)
2. (Thailand) Nitchaon Jindapol (semifinals)
3. (China) Chen Xiaoxin (withdrew)
4. (Thailand) Busanan Ongbumrungpan (first round)
5. (South Korea) Lee Jang-mi (final)
6. (Indonesia) Fitriani (first round)
7. (Canada) Michelle Li (second round)
8. (Thailand) Pornpawee Chochuwong (quarterfinals)

=== Finals ===
Semifinals
(China) Wang Zhiyi	17	8
(China) Gao Fangjie	21	21
5	(South Korea) Lee Jang-mi	21	21
2	(Thailand) Nitchaon Jindapol	19	19

Final
(China) Gao Fangjie	21	21
5	(South Korea) Lee Jang-mi	19	5

=== Top half ===
==== Section 1 ====
First round
1	(South Korea) Sung J-h	23	21
Q3	(South Korea) Kim Y-j	21	10
(Chinese Taipei) Sung S-y	17	13
(China) Zhang YM	21	21
6	(Indonesia) Fitriani	18	21	16
(Malaysia) S Cheah	21	16	21
(China) Wang ZY	21	21
(Malaysia) S. Kisona	16	19

Second round
1	(South Korea) Sung J-h	14	21	25
(China) Zhang YM	21	13	23
(Malaysia) S Cheah	13	12
(China) Wang ZY	21	21

Quarterfinals
1	(South Korea) Sung J-h	25	21	12
(China) Wang ZY	27	7	21

==== Section 2 ====
First round
4	(Thailand) B Ongbamrungphan	21	15	17
(China) Gao FJ	11	21	21
PFQ	(Hungary) L Sarosi	15	21	15
Q4	(South Korea) Bae J-w	21	19	21
8	(Thailand) P Chochuwong	7
(South Korea) Kim H-i	1^{r}
(Indonesia) L A Mainaky	21	16	22
(Chinese Taipei) Chiang M-h	19	21	20

Second round
(China) Gao FJ	21	19	21
Q4	(South Korea) Bae J-w	6	21	16
8	(Thailand) P Chochuwong	16	21	21
(Indonesia) L A Mainaky	21	8	9

Quarterfinals
(China) Gao FJ	21	13	21
8	(Thailand) P Chochuwong	17	21	16

=== Bottom half ===
==== Section 3 ====
First round
(Chinese Taipei) Hu L-f	21	21
(United States) D Gupta	12	7
Q2	(South Korea) Choi Y-r	13	10
5	(South Korea) Lee J-m	21	21
(South Korea) Jeon J-i	21	20	20
Q1	(South Korea) Lee B-l	16	22	22
(Indonesia) G M Tunjung	21	21
PFQ	(Chinese Taipei) Peng L-t	13	6

Second round
(Chinese Taipei) Hu L-f	15	10
5	(South Korea) Lee J-m	21	21
Q1	(South Korea) Lee B-l	2	5^{r}
(Indonesia) G M Tunjung	21	11

Quarterfinals
5	(South Korea) Lee J-m	21	18	21
(Indonesia) G M Tunjung	15	21	15

==== Section 4 ====
First round
(Chinese Taipei) Lee C-h	21	21
(Malaysia) Ho Y M	18	19
(South Korea) Kim H-m	9	15
7	(Canada) M Li	21	21
(Chinese Taipei) Pai Y-p	15	21	6
(South Korea) Lee M-j	21	16	21
(Chinese Taipei) Tang W-y	10	9
2	(Thailand) N Jindapol	21	21

Second round
(Chinese Taipei) Lee C-h	15	21	21
7	(Canada) M Li	21	18	19
(South Korea) Lee M-j	12	15
2	(Thailand) N Jindapol	21	21

Quarterfinals
(Chinese Taipei) Lee C-h	18	8
2	(Thailand) N Jindapol	21	21

== Men's doubles ==
=== Seeds ===
1. (Chinese Taipei) Lee Jhe-huei / Lee Yang (first round)
2. (Chinese Taipei) Lu Ching-yao / Yang Po-han (quarterfinals)
3. (Chinese Taipei) Liao Min-chun / Su Cheng-heng (semifinals)
4. (England) Marcus Ellis / Chris Langridge (withdrew)
5. (Thailand) Bodin Isara / Nipitphon Phuangphuapet (quarterfinals)
6. (Chinese Taipei) Hsu Jen-hao / Wang Chi-lin (first round)
7. (Malaysia) Chooi Kah Ming / Low Juan Shen (first round)
8. (South Korea) Chung Eui-seok / Kim Duk-young (quarterfinals)

=== Finals ===
Semifinals

Final

- (South Korea) Lee Yong-dae
- (South Korea) Yoo Yeon-seong
21
11
19

- (South Korea) Jung Jae-wook
- (South Korea) Kim Gi-jung
16
21
21

- (South Korea) Jung Jae-wook
- (South Korea) Kim Gi-jung
15
16

- (South Korea) Kim Won-ho
- (South Korea) Seo Seung-jae
21
21

3
- (Chinese Taipei) Liao Min-chun
- (Chinese Taipei) Su Cheng-heng
25
12
15

- (South Korea) Kim Won-ho
- (South Korea) Seo Seung-jae
23
21
21

=== Top half ===
==== Section 1 ====
First round

Second round

Quarterfinals

1
- (Chinese Taipei) Lee J-h
- (Chinese Taipei) Lee Y
17
17

- (South Korea) Kang J-w
- (South Korea) Lee S-j
21
21

- (South Korea) Kang J-w
- (South Korea) Lee S-j
10
21
14

- (South Korea) Lee Y-d
- (South Korea) Yoo Y-s
21
18
21

- (South Korea) Lee Y-d
- (South Korea) Yoo Y-s
21
20
21

- (China) Ren XY
- (China) Tan Q
12
22
18

- (South Korea) Lee Y-d
- (South Korea) Yoo Y-s
21
21

- (South Korea) Choi H-g
- (South Korea) Park K-h
9
13

6
- (Chinese Taipei) Hsu J-h
- (Chinese Taipei) Wang C-l
17
21
18

- (South Korea) Choi H-g
- (South Korea) Park K-h
21
16
21

- (South Korea) Choi H-g
- (South Korea) Park K-h
21
21

- (Chinese Taipei) Po L-w
- (Chinese Taipei) Yang M-t
9
18

- (South Korea) Jang S-h
- (South Korea) Ko S-h
16
15

- (Chinese Taipei) Po L-w
- (Chinese Taipei) Yang M-t
21
21

==== Section 2 ====
First round

Second round

Quarterfinals

PFQ
(South Korea) Kang M-h
(South Korea) Lee H-s
21
24
21

Q1
- (South Korea) Kim D-j
- (South Korea) Yim J-k
16
26
16

PFQ
(South Korea) Kang M-h
(South Korea) Lee H-s
18
16

- (South Korea) Jung J-w
- (South Korea) Kim G-j
21
21

- (South Korea) Jung J-w
- (South Korea) Kim G-j
21
21

- (Chinese Taipei) Chang K-c
- (Chinese Taipei) Lu C-p
16
16

- (South Korea) Jung J-w
- (South Korea) Kim G-j
21
19
24

5
- (Thailand) B Isara
- (Thailand) N Phuangphuapet
16
21
22

5
- (Thailand) B Isara
- (Thailand) N Phuangphuapet
21
21

Q4
- (South Korea) Choi H-j
- (South Korea) Lee S-c
12
15

5
- (Thailand) B Isara
- (Thailand) N Phuangphuapet
15
22
21

- (Malaysia) Goh V S
- (Malaysia) Teo E Y
21
20
19

- (Chinese Taipei) Lee S-m
- (Chinese Taipei) Lin C-y
20
21
20

- (Malaysia) Goh V S
- (Malaysia) Teo E Y
22
17
22

=== Bottom half ===
==== Section 3 ====
First round

Second round

Quarterfinals

PFQ
- (South Korea) Kim D-e
- (South Korea) Kim D-s
21
19
21

- (South Korea) Ahn S-s
- (South Korea) Lim J-s
12
21
19

PFQ
- (South Korea) Kim D-e
- (South Korea) Kim D-s
21
15
14

8
- (South Korea) Chung E-s
- (South Korea) Kim D-y
17
21
21

- (China) Chen SH
- (China) Fan QY
21
12
17

8
- (South Korea) Chung E-s
- (South Korea) Kim D-y
19
21
21

8
- (South Korea) Chung E-s
- (South Korea) Kim D-y
17
19

3
- (Chinese Taipei) Liao M-c
- (Chinese Taipei) Su C-h
21
21

PFQ
- (Australia) A Joe
- (Australia) P S Low
18
17

- (Russia) E Dremin
- (Russia) P Kotsarenko
21
21

- (Russia) E Dremin
- (Russia) P Kotsarenko
13
16

3
- (Chinese Taipei) Liao M-c
- (Chinese Taipei) Su C-h
21
21

- (Malaysia) N M A Ayub
- (Malaysia) Ooi Z H
19
12

3
- (Chinese Taipei) Liao M-c
- (Chinese Taipei) Su C-h
21
21

==== Section 4 ====
First round

Second round

Quarterfinals

- (South Korea) Choi S-g
- (South Korea) Kim J-h
21
21

Q2
- (South Korea) Jung T-i
- (South Korea) Kim Y-h
16
12

- (South Korea) Choi S-g
- (South Korea) Kim J-h
16
14

- (South Korea) Kim W-h
- (South Korea) Seo S-j
21
21

- (South Korea) Kim W-h
- (South Korea) Seo S-j
18
21
21

7
- (Malaysia) Chooi K M
- (Malaysia) Low J S
21
17
16

- (South Korea) Kim W-h
- (South Korea) Seo S-j
21
21

2
- (Chinese Taipei) Lu C-y
- (Chinese Taipei) Yang P-h
12
19

- (Chinese Taipei) Chen X-y
- (Chinese Taipei) Wu Y-c
21
23

Q3
- (South Korea) Ahn J-h
- (South Korea) Park M-s
17
21

- (Chinese Taipei) Chen X-y
- (Chinese Taipei) Wu Y-c
14
14

2
- (Chinese Taipei) Lu C-y
- (Chinese Taipei) Yang P-h
21
21

- (Indonesia) W Nayaka
- (Indonesia) A Yusuf
15
21
13

2
- (Chinese Taipei) Lu C-y
- (Chinese Taipei) Yang P-h
21
14
21

== Women's doubles ==
=== Seeds ===
1. (Thailand) Jongkolphan Kititharakul / Rawinda Prajongjai (second round)
2. (Indonesia) Anggia Shitta Awanda / Ni Ketut Mahadewi Istirani (quarterfinals)
3. (Chinese Taipei) Hsu Ya-ching / Wu Ti-jung (first round)
4. (Malaysia) Lim Yin Loo / Yap Cheng Wen (second round)

=== Finals ===
Semifinals

Final

- (Malaysia) Chow Mei Kuan
- (Malaysia) Lee Meng Yean
21
7
12

- (South Korea) Kim So-yeong
- (South Korea) Kong Hee-yong
14
21
21

- (South Korea) Kim So-yeong
- (South Korea) Kong Hee-yong
18
21

- (South Korea) Lee So-hee
- (South Korea) Shin Seung-chan
21
23

- (South Korea) Lee Eun-ah
- (South Korea) Yoon Min-ah
5
9

- (South Korea) Lee So-hee
- (South Korea) Shin Seung-chan
21
21

=== Top half ===
==== Section 1 ====
First round

Second round

Quarterfinals

1
- (Thailand) J Kititharakul
- (Thailand) R Prajongjai
13
12

- (Malaysia) Chow M K
- (Malaysia) Lee M Y
21
21

- (Chinese Taipei) Cheng C-y
- (Chinese Taipei) Chung Y-f
12
14

- (Malaysia) Chow M K
- (Malaysia) Lee M Y
21
21

- (Malaysia) Chow M K
- (Malaysia) Lee M Y
21
21

- (South Korea) Chae Y-j
- (South Korea) Kim H-r
17
8

- (Indonesia) M Mawarti
- (Indonesia) G N Rahmadani

- (Chinese Taipei) Chang C-h
- (Chinese Taipei) Yang C-t
w
/
o

- (Chinese Taipei) Chang C-h
- (Chinese Taipei) Yang C-t
11
6

- (South Korea) Chae Y-j
- (South Korea) Kim H-r
21
21

- (South Korea) Chae Y-j
- (South Korea) Kim H-r
21
21

- (Indonesia) Y Barkah
- (Indonesia) N K Maheswari
9
10

==== Section 2 ====
First round

Second round

Quarterfinals

3
- (Chinese Taipei) Hsu Y-c
- (Chinese Taipei) Wu T-j
13
11

- (South Korea) Kim S-y
- (South Korea) Kong H-y
21
21

- (South Korea) Kim S-y
- (South Korea) Kong H-y
21
21

- (Indonesia) D D Haris
- (Indonesia) R A Pradipta
13
11

- (Indonesia) D D Haris
- (Indonesia) R A Pradipta
21
21

(Thailand) S Amitrapai
(Thailand) P Chochuwong
18
16

- (South Korea) Kim S-y
- (South Korea) Kong H-y
21
21

- (China) Liu XX
- (China) Xia YT
10
11

- (Chinese Taipei) Lin Y-c
- (Chinese Taipei) Pai Y-p
15
21
18

- (China) Liu XX
- (China) Xia YT
21
16
21

- (China) Liu XX
- (China) Xia YT
21
22

- (South Korea) Kang C-h
- (Germany) O Konon
15
20

- (Malaysia) Soong F C
- (Malaysia) Tee J Y
21
13
18

- (South Korea) Kang C-h
- (Germany) O Konon
13
21
21

=== Bottom half ===
==== Section 3 ====
First round

Second round

Quarterfinals

- (Thailand) C Chaladchalam
- (Thailand) P Muenwong
21
21

- (Chinese Taipei) Peng L-t
- (Chinese Taipei) Tang W-y
15
10

- (Thailand) C Chaladchalam
- (Thailand) P Muenwong
15
13

- (South Korea) Lee E-a
- (South Korea) Yoon M-a
21
21

- (South Korea) Lee E-a
- (South Korea) Yoon M-a
21
21

- (Chinese Taipei) Chiang K-h
- (Chinese Taipei) Hung S-h
14
17

- (South Korea) Lee E-a
- (South Korea) Yoon M-a
21
21

- (Chinese Taipei) Cheng Y-c
- (Chinese Taipei) Hu L-f
17
9

- (South Korea) Ji J-b
- (South Korea) Lee D-b
17
19

- (Chinese Taipei) Cheng Y-c
- (Chinese Taipei) Hu L-f
21
21

- (Chinese Taipei) Cheng Y-c
- (Chinese Taipei) Hu L-f
15
21
21

4
- (Malaysia) Lim Y L
- (Malaysia) Yap C W
21
18
18

- (Chinese Taipei) Chang H-t
- (Chinese Taipei) Yu C-h
21
13
14

4
- (Malaysia) Lim Y L
- (Malaysia) Yap C W
15
21
21

==== Section 4 ====
First round

Second round

Quarterfinals

- (Australia) S Mapasa
- (Australia) G Somerville

- (South Korea) Lee S-h
- (South Korea) Shin S-c
w
/
o

- (South Korea) Lee S-h
- (South Korea) Shin S-c
21
21

- (South Korea) Baek H-n
- (South Korea) Lee Y-r
16
16

- (South Korea) Baek H-n
- (South Korea) Lee Y-r
18
21
21

- (Chinese Taipei) Chen H-h
- (Chinese Taipei) Hsieh P-s
21
9
11

- (South Korea) Lee S-h
- (South Korea) Shin S-c
21
24

2
- (Indonesia) A S Awanda
- (Indonesia) N K M Istarani
14
22

- (South Korea) Bang J-s
- (South Korea) Han G-h
21
19
16

- (China) Feng ZX
- (China) Zhang SX
14
21
21

- (China) Feng ZX
- (China) Zhang SX
14
11

2
- (Indonesia) A S Awanda
- (Indonesia) N K M Istarani
21
21

- (South Korea) Chang Y-n
- (South Korea) Jung K-e
21
14
20

2
- (Indonesia) A S Awanda
- (Indonesia) N K M Istarani
14
21
22

== Mixed doubles ==
=== Seeds ===
1. (South Korea) Choi Sol-gyu / Chae Yoo-jung (final)
2. (Singapore) Terry Hee Yong Kai / Tan Wei Han (quarterfinals)
3. (Chinese Taipei) Wang Chi-lin / Lee Chia-hsin (second round)
4. (South Korea) Seo Seung-jae / Kim Ha-na (champions)
5. (Chinese Taipei) Liao Min-chun / Chen Hsiao-huan (second round)
6. (Thailand) Bodin Isara / Savitree Amitrapai (first round)
7. (South Korea) Kim Won-ho / Shin Seung-chan (semifinals)
8. (South Korea) Ko Sung-hyun / Ko Hye-ryeon (first round)

=== Finals ===
Semifinals

Final

1
- (South Korea) Choi Sol-gyu
- (South Korea) Chae Yoo-jung
21
21

7
- (South Korea) Kim Won-ho
- (South Korea) Shin Seung-chan
17
12

1
- (South Korea) Choi Sol-gyu
- (South Korea) Chae Yoo-jung
21
13
18

4
- (South Korea) Seo Seung-jae
- (South Korea) Kim Ha-na
17
21
21

4
- (South Korea) Seo Seung-jae
- (South Korea) Kim Ha-na
21
21

- (Indonesia) Hafiz Faisal
- (Indonesia) Gloria Emanuelle Widjaja
15
11

=== Top half ===
==== Section 1 ====
First round

Second round

Quarterfinals

1
- (South Korea) Choi S-g
- (South Korea) Chae Y-j
21
21

- (Chinese Taipei) Tseng M-h
- (Chinese Taipei) Hu L-f
18
10

1
- (South Korea) Choi S-g
- (South Korea) Chae Y-j
23
21

- (Chinese Taipei) Lee Y
- (Chinese Taipei) Hsu Y-c
21
14

(Thailand) T Isriyanet
(Thailand) P Chochuwong
24
21
17

- (Chinese Taipei) Lee Y
- (Chinese Taipei) Hsu Y-c
26
19
21

1
- (South Korea) Choi S-g
- (South Korea) Chae Y-j
w
/
o

- (Poland) R Mateusiak
- (Germany) O Konon

8
- (South Korea) Ko S-h
- (South Korea) Ko H-r
12
7

- (Thailand) N Phuangphuapet
- (Thailand) J Kititharakul
21
21

- (Thailand) N Phuangphuapet
- (Thailand) J Kititharakul
21
20
14

- (Poland) R Mateusiak
- (Germany) O Konon
17
22
21

- (Poland) R Mateusiak
- (Germany) O Konon
21
21

- (Chinese Taipei) Po L-w
- (Chinese Taipei) Chang C-h
19
15

==== Section 2 ====
First round

Second round

Quarterfinals

3
- (Chinese Taipei) Wang C-l
- (Chinese Taipei) Lee C-h
21
21

PFQ
- (Chinese Taipei) Su C-h
- (Chinese Taipei) Hsieh P-s
12
10

3
- (Chinese Taipei) Wang C-l
- (Chinese Taipei) Lee C-h
21
14
17

- (Indonesia) A E Prasetya
- (Indonesia) M D Oktavianti
16
21
21

- (Indonesia) A E Prasetya
- (Indonesia) M D Oktavianti
21
21

- (Chinese Taipei) Wu Y-c
- (Chinese Taipei) Yang C-t
15
19

- (Indonesia) A E Prasetya
- (Indonesia) M D Oktavianti
21
12
18

7
- (South Korea) Kim W-h
- (South Korea) Shin S-c
18
21
21

7
- (South Korea) Kim W-h
- (South Korea) Shin S-c
21
19
21

- (Chinese Taipei) Lu C-p
- (Chinese Taipei) Chang H-t
5
21
15

7
- (South Korea) Kim W-h
- (South Korea) Shin S-c
21
21

- (Malaysia) Chan P S
- (Malaysia) Cheah Y S
15
16

- (Malaysia) Chan P S
- (Malaysia) Cheah Y S
21
21

- (South Korea) Kang J-w
- (South Korea) Han G-h
15
12

=== Bottom half ===
==== Section 3 ====
First round

Second round

Quarterfinals

- (South Korea) Choi H-j
- (South Korea) Go A-r
21
21

- (Indonesia) Y F Mainaky
- (Indonesia) L A Mainaky
13
9

- (South Korea) Choi H-j
- (South Korea) Go A-r
21
12
13

- (South Korea) Kim J-h
- (South Korea) Lee S-h
18
21
21

- (South Korea) Kim J-h
- (South Korea) Lee S-h
17
21
21

6
- (Thailand) B Isara
- (Thailand) S Amitrapai
21
10
10

- (South Korea) Kim J-h
- (South Korea) Lee S-h
13
18

4
- (South Korea) Seo S-j
- (South Korea) Kim H-n
21
21

Q3
- (South Korea) Kim H-t
- (South Korea) Kim S-y
17
15

- (Chinese Taipei) Chang K-c
- (Chinese Taipei) Cheng C-y
21
21

- (Chinese Taipei) Chang K-c
- (Chinese Taipei) Cheng C-y
21
17
16

4
- (South Korea) Seo S-j
- (South Korea) Kim H-n
17
21
21

- (Russia) E Dremin
- (Russia) E Dimova
15
13

4
- (South Korea) Seo S-j
- (South Korea) Kim H-n
21
21

==== Section 4 ====
First round

Second round

Quarterfinals

Q4
- (South Korea) Park K-h
- (South Korea) Baek H-n
18
18

- (Indonesia) H Faisal
- (Indonesia) G E Widjaja
21
21

- (Indonesia) H Faisal
- (Indonesia) G E Widjaja
16
21
21

5
- (Chinese Taipei) Liao M-c
- (Chinese Taipei) Chen H-h
21
19
14

Q2
- (China) Chen SH
- (China) Xia YT
13
11

5
- (Chinese Taipei) Liao M-c
- (Chinese Taipei) Chen H-h
21
21

- (Indonesia) H Faisal
- (Indonesia) G E Widjaja
21
21

2
- (Singapore) Hee Y K
- (Singapore) Tan W H
16
14

Q1
- (South Korea) Kim D-j
- (South Korea) Choi H-i
21
21

- (China) Di ZJ
- (China) Zhang SX
6
17

Q1
- (South Korea) Kim D-j
- (South Korea) Choi H-i
14
18

2
- (Singapore) Hee Y K
- (Singapore) Tan W H
21
21

PFQ
- (Chinese Taipei) Chang E-c
- (Chinese Taipei) Chung Y-f
6
15

2
- (Singapore) Hee Y K
- (Singapore) Tan W H
21
21

Preceded by 2017 Scottish Open Grand Prix	BWF Grand Prix Gold and Grand Prix; 2017 BWF Season	Succeeded by 2018 Thailand Masters
