= 2015 Korea Open Super Series – Qualification =

Qualification for 2015 Korea Open Super Series will be held on 15 September 2015.

== Men's Single ==
=== Seeds ===
1. (South Korea) Lee Dong-keun
2. (Indonesia) Jonatan Christie
3. (Malaysia) Zulfadli Zulkiffli
4. (Japan) Kenichi Tago

=== Qualifying draw ===
==== First qualifier ====
First round
1	(South Korea) Lee Dong-keun
(Scotland) Alistair Casey
(South Korea) Jeon Hyeok-jin
(Chinese Taipei) Wang Tzu-wei

Qualifying competition

==== Second qualifier ====
First round
4	(Japan) Kenichi Tago
(Indonesia) Ihsan Maulana Mustofa
(Malaysia) Lee Chong Wei
(South Korea) Heo Kwang-hee

Qualifying competition

==== Third qualifier ====
First round
(Malaysia) Mohamad Arif Abdul Latif
(Japan) Kazumasa Sakai
(United States) Sattawat Pongnairat
3	(Malaysia) Zulfadli Zulkiffli

Qualifying competition

==== Fourth qualifier ====
First round
(Indonesia) Anthony Sinisuka Ginting
(South Korea) Kim Dong-hoon
(Japan) Riichi Takeshita
2	(Indonesia) Jonatan Christie

Qualifying competition

== Women's Single ==
=== Seeds ===
1. (Thailand) Nitchaon Jindapol
2. (Japan) Aya Ohori
3. (United States) Jamie Subandhi
4. (South Korea) Lee Jang-mi

=== Qualifying draw ===
==== First qualifier ====
First round
1	(Thailand) Nitchaon Jindapol
BYE
(South Korea) Kim Na-young
BYE

Qualifying competition
1	(Thailand) Nitchaon Jindapol
(South Korea) Kim Na-young

==== Second qualifier ====
First round
4	(South Korea) Lee Jang-mi
BYE
(Indonesia) Lyanny Alessandra Mainaky
(South Korea) Han So-yeon

Qualifying competition
4	(South Korea) Lee Jang-mi

==== Third qualifier ====
First round
(Chinese Taipei) Chen Hsiao-huan
(South Korea) Kim Ye-ji
BYE
3	(United States) Jamie Subandhi

Qualifying competition
3	(United States) Jamie Subandhi

==== Fourth qualifier ====
First round
BYE
(South Korea) Ko Eun-byeol
BYE
2	(Japan) Aya Ohori

Qualifying competition
(South Korea) Ko Eun-byeol
2	(Japan) Aya Ohori

== Men's doubles ==
=== Seeds ===
1. (China) Liu Cheng / (China) Lu Kai
2. (South Korea) Chung Eui-seok / (South Korea) Kim Duk-young

=== Qualifying draw ===
==== First qualifier ====
Qualifying competition
1	(China) Liu Cheng (China) Lu Kai
	BYE

==== Second qualifier ====
Qualifying competition
(South Korea) Chan Jun-bong (South Korea) Kim Dae-eun
BYE

==== Third qualifier ====
Qualifying competition
(South Korea) Choi Sol-gyu (South Korea) Kim Jae-hwan
(Hong Kong) Alan Chan Yun Lung (Hong Kong) Reginald Lee Chun Hei

==== Fourth qualifier ====
Qualifying competition
	BYE
2	(South Korea) Chung Eui-seok (South Korea) Kim Duk-young

== Mixed doubles ==
=== Seeds ===
1. (South Korea) Kim Duk-young / (South Korea) Kim Hye-rin
2. (South Korea) Kim Jae-hwan / (South Korea) Kim So-yeong
3. (Japan) Kenta Kazuno / (Japan) Ayane Kurihara
4. (South Korea) Yoo Yeon-seong / (South Korea) Jang Ye-na

=== Qualifying draw ===
==== First qualifier ====
Qualifying competition
1	(South Korea) Kim Duk-young (South Korea) Kim Hye-rin
	(Russia) Ivan Sozonov (Russia) Ekaterina Bolotova

==== Second qualifier ====
Qualifying competition
4	(South Korea) Yoo Yeon-seong (South Korea) Jang Ye-na
	(Indonesia) Yehezkiel Fritz Mainaky (Indonesia) Lyanny Alessandra Mainaky

==== Third qualifier ====
Qualifying competition
	(South Korea) Chung Eui-seok (South Korea) Kong Hee-yong
3	(Japan) Kenta Kazuno (Japan) Ayane Kurihara

==== Fourth qualifier ====
Qualifying competition
	(Russia) Vladimir Ivanov (Russia) Evgeniya Kosetskaya
2	(South Korea) Kim Jae-hwan (South Korea) Kim So-yeong
