= 2015 Korea Open Super Series =

Tournament details
- Dates: 15 September 2015 – 20 September 2015
- Level: Super Series
- Total prize money: US$600,000
- Venue: SK Handball Stadium (Olympic Gymnasium 2)
- Location: Seoul, South Korea

Champions
- Men's singles: (China) Chen Long
- Women's singles: (South Korea) Sung Ji-hyun
- Men's doubles: (South Korea) Lee Yong-dae (South Korea) Yoo Yeon-seong
- Women's doubles: (Indonesia) Nitya Krishinda Maheswari (Indonesia) Greysia Polii
- Mixed doubles: (China) Zhang Nan (China) Zhao Yunlei

The 2015 Korea Open Super Series is the eighth Super Series tournament of the 2015 BWF Super Series. The tournament took place at SK Handball Stadium (Olympic Gymnasium 2) in Seoul, South Korea from September 15–20, 2015 and had a total purse of $600,000. A qualification was held to fill four places in four disciplines (no qualification for women's doubles) of the main draws.

== Men's singles ==
=== Seeds ===
1. (China) Chen Long (Champion)
2. (Denmark) Jan Ø. Jørgensen (withdrew)
3. (Japan) Kento Momota (Semifinals)
4. (India) Srikanth Kidambi (1st round)
5. (China) Lin Dan (2nd round)
6. (Denmark) Viktor Axelsen (1st round)
7. (Chinese Taipei) Chou Tien-chen (Semifinals)
8. (India) Parupalli Kashyap (1st round)

=== Top half ===
First Round
1	(China) Chen L	21	21
(Thailand) T Saensomboonsuk	10	12
(Indonesia) D H Rumbaka	16	21
(China) Wang ZM	21	23
5	(China) Lin D	21	21
Q4	(Japan) R Takeshita	17	17
(England) R Ouseph	13	8
(South Korea) Son W-h	21	21
3	(Japan) K Momota	21	21
(Hong Kong) Ng K L	12	15
Q3	(Malaysia) Z Zulkiffli	14	8
(Indonesia) T Sugiarto	21	21
8	(India) K Parupalli	21	16	18
(Hong Kong) Wei N	17	21	21
(Chinese Taipei) Hsu J-h	21	15	22
(Hong Kong) Hu Y	16	21	20

Second Round
1	(China) Chen L	21	21
(China) Wang ZM	14	17
5	(China) Lin D	10	15
(South Korea) Son W-h	21	21
3	(Japan) K Momota	21	14	21
(Indonesia) T Sugiarto	15	21	13
(Hong Kong) Wei N	21	21
(Chinese Taipei) Hsu J-h	13	16

Quarterfinals
1	(China) Chen L	25	21
(South Korea) Son W-h	23	13
3	(Japan) K Momota	21	21
(Hong Kong) Wei N	13	16

Semifinals
1	(China) Chen L	21	21
3	(Japan) K Momota	9	13

=== Bottom half ===
First Round
(Thailand) B Ponsana	21	21
(Denmark) H-K Vittinghus	16	17
(India) H. S. Prannoy	21	19	17
7	(Chinese Taipei) Chou T-c	18	21	21
(Germany) M Zwiebler	21	11	12
Q2	(Indonesia) I M Mustofa	19	21	21
(China) Tian HW	12	21	21
4	(India) S Kidambi	21	13	17
(Hong Kong) Wong W K	7	21	21
Q1	(South Korea) Jeon H-j	21	15	19
(India) A Jayaram	21	21
6	(Denmark) V Axelsen	15	15
(Japan) S Sasaki	21	21
(Republic of Ireland) S Evans	19	14
PFQ	(South Korea) Lee D-k	21	21	13
PFQ	(Indonesia) J Christie	23	16	21

Second Round
(Thailand) B Ponsana	19	21	13
7	(Chinese Taipei) Chou T-c	21	11	21
Q2	(Indonesia) I M Mustofa	17	10
(China) Tian HW	21	21
(Hong Kong) Wong W K	21	15	15
(India) A Jayaram	17	21	21
(Japan) S Sasaki	21	16	21
PFQ	(Indonesia) J Christie	15	21	13

Quarterfinals
7	(Chinese Taipei) Chou T-c	21	21
(China) Tian HW	19	19
(India) A Jayaram	21	16	21
(Japan) S Sasaki	19	21	16

Semifinals
7	(Chinese Taipei) Chou T-c	19	15
(India) A Jayaram	21	21

=== Finals ===
Semifinals
1	(China) Chen Long	21	21
3	(Japan) Kento Momota	9	13
7	(Chinese Taipei) Chou Tien-chen	19	15
(India) Ajay Jayaram	21	21

Final
1	(China) Chen Long	21	21
(India) Ajay Jayaram	14	13

== Women's singles ==
=== Seeds ===
1. (Chinese Taipei) Tai Tzu-ying (Quarterfinals)
2. (China) Li Xuerui (Quarterfinals)
3. (Thailand) Ratchanok Intanon (1st round)
4. (China) Wang Yihan (Final)
5. (China) Wang Shixian (Semifinals)
6. (South Korea) Sung Ji-hyun (Champion)
7. (Japan) Nozomi Okuhara (Quarterfinals)
8. (Japan) Akane Yamaguchi (Semifinals)

=== Top half ===
First Round
1	(Chinese Taipei) Tai T-y	21	21
(United States) B Zhang	13	11
(Chinese Taipei) Hsu Y-c	21	21
(Indonesia) M F Kusumastuti	18	18
6	(South Korea) Sung J-h	21	21
(Japan) S Sato	18	9
Q3	(South Korea) Kim Y-j	13	17
Q1	(South Korea) Kim N-y	21	21
3	(Thailand) R Intanon	19	23	13
(India) P. V. Sindhu	21	21	21
(Japan) S Takahashi	21	21
(Hong Kong) Yip P Y	6	13
8	(Japan) A Yamaguchi	21	21
(South Korea) Kim H-m	17	19
(Canada) M Li	21	21
(Hong Kong) Cheung N Y	12	18

Second Round
1	(Chinese Taipei) Tai T-y	21	21
(Chinese Taipei) Hsu Y-c	14	19
6	(South Korea) Sung J-h	21	21
Q1	(South Korea) Kim N-y	15	13
(India) P. V. Sindhu	16	13
(Japan) S Takahashi	21	21
8	(Japan) A Yamaguchi	21	21
(Canada) M Li	19	13

Quarterfinals
1	(Chinese Taipei) Tai T-y	20	13
6	(South Korea) Sung J-h	22	21
(Japan) S Takahashi	14	18
8	(Japan) A Yamaguchi	21	21

Semifinals
6	(South Korea) Sung J-h	21	15	21
8	(Japan) A Yamaguchi	15	21	18

=== Bottom half ===
First Round
(Japan) K Imabeppu	18	11
(South Korea) Bae Y-j	21	21
(Thailand) P Buranaprasertsuk	18	21	19
7	(Japan) N Okuhara	21	19	21
(Thailand) B Ongbamrungphan	21	21
(United States) I Wang	10	18
(Chinese Taipei) Pai Y-p	12	12
4	(China) Wang YH	21	21
Q4	(Japan) A Ohori	21	22
(Indonesia) L Fanetri	16	20
(Japan) Y Hashimoto	16	22	14
5	(China) Wang SX	21	20	21
(Japan) M Mitani	12	16
(China) Sun Y	21	21
Q2	(South Korea) Lee J-m	12	11
2	(China) Li XR	21	21

Second Round
(South Korea) Bae Y-j	21	8	13
7	(Japan) N Okuhara	13	21	21
(Thailand) B Ongbamrungphan	21	13	13
4	(China) Wang YH	8	21	21
Q4	(Japan) A Ohori	14	7
5	(China) Wang SX	21	21
(China) Sun Y	21	13	9
2	(China) Li XR	18	21	21

Quarterfinals
7	(Japan) N Okuhara	19	13
4	(China) Wang YH	21	21
5	(China) Wang SX	10	21	21
2	(China) Li XR	21	19	10

Semifinals
4	(China) Wang YH	21	21
5	(China) Wang SX	12	19

=== Finals ===
Semifinals
6	(South Korea) Sung Ji-hyun	21	15	21
8	(Japan) Akane Yamaguchi	15	21	18
4	(China) Wang Yihan	21	21
5	(China) Wang Shixian	12	19

Final
6	(South Korea) Sung Ji-hyun	21	17	21
4	(China) Wang YH	14	21	18

== Men's doubles ==
=== Seeds ===
1. (South Korea) Lee Yong-dae / Yoo Yeon-seong (Champion)
2. (Indonesia) Mohammad Ahsan / Hendra Setiawan (Quarterfinals)
3. (Denmark) Mathias Boe / Carsten Mogensen (Semifinals)
4. (China) Fu Haifeng / Zhang Nan (Semifinals)
5. (China) Chai Biao / Hong Wei (2nd round)
6. (Japan) Hiroyuki Endo / Kenichi Hayakawa (Quarterfinals)
7. (China) Liu Xiaolong / Qiu Zihan (1st round)
8. (Chinese Taipei) Lee Sheng-mu / Tsai Chia-hsin (2nd round)

=== Top half ===
First Round
1	(South Korea) Lee Y-d (South Korea) Yoo Y-s	21	21
(Indonesia) M F Gideon (Indonesia) K S Sukamuljo	11	12
(Chinese Taipei) Liao M-c (Chinese Taipei) Tseng M-h	13	21	21
Q4	(South Korea) Chung E-s (South Korea) Kim D-y	21	17	16
6	(Japan) H Endo (Japan) K Hayakawa	21	21
Q1	(China) Liu C (China) Lu K	16	14
(Denmark) M Conrad-Petersen (Denmark) M Pieler Kolding	22	21
(Indonesia) A Adistia (Indonesia) H A Gunawan	20	16
3	(Denmark) M Boe (Denmark) C Mogensen	21	21
(Japan) H Hashimoto (Japan) N Hirata	19	14
(United States) P Chew (United States) S Pongnairat	15	19
(Indonesia) W Nayaka (Indonesia) A Yusuf	21	21
8	(Chinese Taipei) Lee S-m (Chinese Taipei) Tsai C-h	21	7	21
(China) Wang YL (China) Zhang W	11	21	17
(South Korea) Ko S-h (South Korea) Shin B-c	20	25	21
(Russia) V Ivanov (Russia) I Sozonov	22	23	14

Second Round
1	(South Korea) Lee Y-d (South Korea) Yoo Y-s	27	21
(Chinese Taipei) Liao M-c (Chinese Taipei) Tseng M-h	25	5
6	(Japan) H Endo (Japan) K Hayakawa	21	21
(Denmark) M Conrad-Petersen (Denmark) M Pieler Kolding	18	5
3	(Denmark) M Boe (Denmark) C Mogensen	21	21
(Indonesia) W Nayaka (Indonesia) A Yusuf	11	14
8	(Chinese Taipei) Lee S-m (Chinese Taipei) Tsai C-h	18	22
(South Korea) Ko S-h (South Korea) Shin B-c	21	24

Quarterfinals
1	(South Korea) Lee Y-d (South Korea) Yoo Y-s	21	22
6	(Japan) H Endo (Japan) K Hayakawa	15	20
3	(Denmark) M Boe (Denmark) C Mogensen	21	21
(South Korea) Ko S-h (South Korea) Shin B-c	13	16

Semifinals
1	(South Korea) Lee Y-d (South Korea) Yoo Y-s	23	22	21
3	(Denmark) M Boe (Denmark) C Mogensen	25	20	17

=== Bottom half ===
First Round
(England) M Ellis (England) C Langridge	16	10
(Malaysia) Koo K K (Malaysia) Tan B H	21	21
(Denmark) K Astrup (Denmark) A S Rasmussen	19	15
5	(China) Chai B (China) Hong W	21	21
(Japan) T Kamura (Japan) K Sonoda	11	18
Q3	(South Korea) Choi S-g (South Korea) Kim J-h	21	21
(Japan) K Kazuno (Japan) K Yamada	15	14
4	(China) Fu HF (China) Zhang N	21	21
(South Korea) Kim G-j (South Korea) Kim S-r	21	21
(Japan) T Inoue (Japan) Y Kaneko	12	8
(Indonesia) A Pratama (Indonesia) R K Suwardi	21	21
7	(China) Liu XL (China) Qiu ZH	14	12
Q2	(South Korea) Jun B-c (South Korea) Kim D-e	15	15
(Malaysia) Goh V S (Malaysia) Tan W K	21	21
(Thailand) D Puavaranukroh (Thailand) K Kedren	13	16
2	(Indonesia) M Ahsan (Indonesia) H Setiawan	21	21

Second Round
(Malaysia) Koo K K (Malaysia) Tan B H	21	21
5	(China) Chai B (China) Hong W	14	12
Q3	(South Korea) Choi S-g (South Korea) Kim J-h	18	21	12
4	(China) Fu HF (China) Zhang N	21	17	21
(South Korea) Kim G-j (South Korea) Kim S-r	21	21
(Indonesia) A Pratama (Indonesia) R K Suwardi	19	15
(Malaysia) Goh V S (Malaysia) Tan W K	19	19
2	(Indonesia) M Ahsan (Indonesia) H Setiawan	21	21

Quarterfinals
(Malaysia) Koo K K (Malaysia) Tan B H	16	12
4	(China) Fu HF (China) Zhang N	21	21
(South Korea) Kim G-j (South Korea) Kim S-r	21	21
2	(Indonesia) M Ahsan (Indonesia) H Setiawan	17	15

Semifinals
4	(China) Fu HF (China) Zhang N	21	18	17
(South Korea) Kim G-j (South Korea) Kim S-r	12	21	21

=== Finals ===
Semifinals
1	(South Korea) Lee Yong-dae (South Korea) Yoo Yeon-seong	23	22	21
3	(Denmark) Mathias Boe (Denmark) Carsten Mogensen	25	20	17
4	(China) Fu Haifeng (China) Zhang Nan	21	18	17
(South Korea) Kim Gi-jung (South Korea) Kim Sa-rang	12	21	21

Final
1	(South Korea) Lee Yong-dae (South Korea) Yoo Yeon-seong	21	21
(South Korea) Kim Gi-jung (South Korea) Kim Sa-rang	16	12

== Women's doubles ==
=== Seeds ===
1. (Japan) Misaki Matsutomo / Ayaka Takahashi (withdrew)
2. (China) Luo Ying / Luo Yu (Semifinals)
3. (Denmark) Christinna Pedersen / Kamilla Rytter Juhl (Quarterfinals)
4. (China) Wang Xiaoli / Yu Yang (Quarterfinals)
5. (China) Ma Jin / Tang Yuanting (Quarterfinals)
6. (Indonesia) Nitya Krishinda Maheswari / Greysia Polii (Champion)
7. (Japan) Reika Kakiiwa / Miyuki Maeda (withdrew)
8. (China) Bao Yixin / Zhong Qianxin (1st round)

=== Top half ===
First Round
(South Korea) Jung K-e (South Korea) Shin S-c	21	21
(Chinese Taipei) Hsieh P-c (Chinese Taipei) Wu T-j	10	15
5	(China) Ma J (China) Tang YT	21	21
(South Korea) Eom H-w (South Korea) Kim H-n	19	17
(China) Tang JH (China) Tian Q	21	21
(Netherlands) S Barning (Netherlands) I Tabeling	8	9
3	(Denmark) C Pedersen (Denmark) K Rytter Juhl	w	/	o
(Malaysia) V Hoo K M (Malaysia) Woon K W
(Hong Kong) Poon L Y (Hong Kong) Tse Y S	16	21	19
(Japan) N Fukuman (Japan) K Yonao	21	14	21
8	(China) Bao YX (China) Zhong QX	21	17	18
(South Korea) Chae Y-j (South Korea) Kim S-y	15	21	21
(Russia) E Bolotova (Russia) E Kosetskaya
(South Korea) Chang Y-n (South Korea) Lee S-h	w	/	o

Second Round
1	(Japan) M Matsutomo (Japan) A Takahashi
(South Korea) Jung K-e (South Korea) Shin S-c	w	/	o
5	(China) Ma J (China) Tang YT	21	10	21
(China) Tang JH (China) Tian Q	18	21	13
3	(Denmark) C Pedersen (Denmark) K Rytter Juhl	21	21
(Japan) N Fukuman (Japan) K Yonao	11	15
(South Korea) Chae Y-j (South Korea) Kim S-y	7	12
(South Korea) Chang Y-n (South Korea) Lee S-h	21	21

Quarterfinals
(South Korea) Jung K-e (South Korea) Shin S-c	14	21	21
5	(China) Ma J (China) Tang YT	21	17	19
3	(Denmark) C Pedersen (Denmark) K Rytter Juhl	16	19
(South Korea) Chang Y-n (South Korea) Lee S-h	21	21

Semifinals
(South Korea) Jung K-e (South Korea) Shin S-c	14	13
(South Korea) Chang Y-n (South Korea) Lee S-h	21	21

=== Bottom half ===
First Round
(Japan) S Matsuo (Japan) M Naito	26	21
(India) P Gadre (India) N S Reddy	24	9
(United States) E Lee (United States) P L Obanana	11	14
6	(Indonesia) N K Maheswari (Indonesia) G Polii	21	21
(Thailand) C Chaladchalam (Thailand) P Muenwong	21	21
(Japan) A Kurihara (Japan) N Shinoya	17	14
(Thailand) P Supajirakul (Thailand) S Taerattanachai	10	21	8
4	(China) Wang XL (China) Yu Y	21	19	21
(South Korea) Kim H-r (South Korea) Kong H-y	17	11
(Netherlands) E Muskens (Netherlands) S Piek	21	21
(Indonesia) D D Haris (Indonesia) R A Pradipta	w	/	o
7	(Japan) R Kakiiwa (Japan) M Maeda
(South Korea) Go A-r (South Korea) Yoo H-w	w	/	o
(India) J Gutta (India) A Ponnappa
(Chinese Taipei) Hsu Y-c (Chinese Taipei) Pai Y-p	14	19
2	(China) Luo Y (China) Luo Y	21	21

Second Round
(Japan) S Matsuo (Japan) M Naito	9	16
6	(Indonesia) N K Maheswari (Indonesia) G Polii	21	21
(Thailand) C Chaladchalam (Thailand) P Muenwong	15	11
4	(China) Wang XL (China) Yu Y	21	21
(Netherlands) E Muskens (Netherlands) S Piek	21	14	21
(Indonesia) D D Haris (Indonesia) R A Pradipta	13	21	12
(South Korea) Go A-r (South Korea) Yoo H-w	21	16	20
2	(China) Luo Y (China) Luo Y	16	21	22

Quarterfinals
6	(Indonesia) N K Maheswari (Indonesia) G Polii	21	21
4	(China) Wang XL (China) Yu Y	4	18
(Netherlands) E Muskens (Netherlands) S Piek	18	21	10
2	(China) Luo Y (China) Luo Y	21	17	21

Semifinals
6	(Indonesia) N K Maheswari (Indonesia) G Polii	21	17	21
2	(China) Luo Y (China) Luo Y	18	21	13

=== Finals ===
Semifinals
(South Korea) Jung Kyung-eun (South Korea) Shin Seung-chan	14	13
(South Korea) Chang Ye-na (South Korea) Lee So-hee	21	21
6	(Indonesia) Nitya Krishinda Maheswari (Indonesia) Greysia Polii	21	17	21
2	(China) Luo Ying (China) Luo Yu	18	21	13

Final
(South Korea) Chang Ye-na (South Korea) Lee So-hee	15	18
6	(Indonesia) Nitya Krishinda Maheswari (Indonesia) Greysia Polii	21	21

== Mixed doubles ==
=== Seeds ===
1. (China) Zhang Nan / Zhao Yunlei (Champion)
2. (Indonesia) Tantowi Ahmad / Liliyana Natsir (Final)
3. (China) Xu Chen / Ma Jin (2nd round)
4. (China) Liu Cheng / Bao Yixin (Quarterfinals)
5. (England) Chris Adcock / Gabby Adcock (Semifinals)
6. (China) Lu Kai / Huang Yaqiong (Quarterfinals)
7. (South Korea) Ko Sung-hyun / Kim Ha-na (Semifinals)
8. (Indonesia) Riky Widianto / Richi Puspita Dili (2nd round)

=== Top half ===
First Round
1	(China) Zhang N (China) Zhao YL	21	21
(India) T Kona (India) N. S Reddy	11	10
Q1	(Japan) K Kazuno (Japan) A Kurihara	22	21
(South Korea) Choi S-g (South Korea) Eom H-w	20	13
8	(Indonesia) R Widianto (Indonesia) R P Dili	21	21
(China) Wang YL (China) Luo Y	17	18
Q2	(South Korea) Yoo Y-s (South Korea) Chang Y-n	16	16
(South Korea) Shin B-c (South Korea) Chae Y-j	21	21
4	(China) Liu C (China) Bao YX	21	22
(South Korea) Kim G-j (South Korea) Shin S-c	19	20
(Malaysia) Tan A Q (Malaysia) Lai P J	14	21	17
(Netherlands) J Arends (Netherlands) S Piek	21	17	21
7	(South Korea) Ko S-h (South Korea) Kim H-n	21	21
(Hong Kong) Lee C H (Hong Kong) Chau H W	18	12
(Japan) K Sonoda (Japan) N Fukuman	23	21	21
(Indonesia) A Adistia (Indonesia) V Marissa	25	15	14

Second Round
1	(China) Zhang N (China) Zhao YL	21	21
Q1	(Japan) K Kazuno (Japan) A Kurihara	19	14
8	(Indonesia) R Widianto (Indonesia) R P Dili	8	12
(South Korea) Shin B-c (South Korea) Chae Y-j	21	21
4	(China) Liu C (China) Bao YX	13	21	21
(Netherlands) J Arends (Netherlands) S Piek	21	10	15
7	(South Korea) Ko S-h (South Korea) Kim H-n	21	17	21
(Japan) K Sonoda (Japan) N Fukuman	16	21	16

Quarterfinals
1	(China) Zhang N (China) Zhao YL	21	21
(South Korea) Shin B-c (South Korea) Chae Y-j	14	9
4	(China) Liu C (China) Bao YX	21	19	12
7	(South Korea) Ko S-h (South Korea) Kim H-n	15	21	21

Semifinals
1	(China) Zhang N (China) Zhao YL	21	12	21
7	(South Korea) Ko S-h (South Korea) Kim H-n	15	21	10

=== Bottom half ===
First Round
(Hong Kong) Chan Y L (Hong Kong) Tse Y S	21	17	21
(Indonesia) E Subaktiar (Indonesia) G E Widjaja	15	21	17
(Chinese Taipei) Liao M-c (Chinese Taipei) Chen H-h	15	17
5	(England) C Adcock (England) G Adcock	21	21
(Thailand) S Prakamol (Thailand) S Thoungthongkam	21	12	21
Q3	(South Korea) Chung E-s (South Korea) Kong H-y	10	21	15
(Indonesia) R Alexander (Indonesia) M D Oktavianti	14	15
3	(China) Xu C (China) Ma J	21	21
PFQ	(South Korea) Kim D-y (South Korea) Kim H-r	16	21	21
Q4	(South Korea) Kim J-h (South Korea) Kim S-y	21	18	13
(Malaysia) Chan P S (Malaysia) Goh L Y	21	12	15
6	(China) Lu K (China) Huang YQ	18	21	21
(South Korea) Lee Y-d (South Korea) Lee S-h	17	15
(Indonesia) P Jordan (Indonesia) D Susanto	21	21
(United States) P Chew (United States) J Subandhi	8	16
2	(Indonesia) T Ahmad (Indonesia) L Natsir	21	21

Second Round
(Hong Kong) Chan Y L (Hong Kong) Tse Y S	20	16
5	(England) C Adcock (England) G Adcock	22	21
(Thailand) S Prakamol (Thailand) S Thoungthongkam	25	15	21
3	(China) Xu C (China) Ma J	23	21	18
PFQ	(South Korea) Kim D-y (South Korea) Kim H-r	15	8
6	(China) Lu K (China) Huang YQ	21	21
(Indonesia) P Jordan (Indonesia) D Susanto	10	13
2	(Indonesia) T Ahmad (Indonesia) L Natsir	21	21

Quarterfinals
5	(England) C Adcock (England) G Adcock	21	21
(Thailand) S Prakamol (Thailand) S Thoungthongkam	16	17
6	(China) Lu K (China) Huang YQ	21	11	17
2	(Indonesia) T Ahmad (Indonesia) L Natsir	16	21	21

Semifinals
5	(England) C Adcock (England) G Adcock	9	15
2	(Indonesia) T Ahmad (Indonesia) L Natsir	21	21

=== Finals ===
Semifinals
1	(China) Zhang Nan (China) Zhao Yunlei	21	12	21
7	(South Korea) Ko Sung-hyun (South Korea) Kim Ha-na	15	21	10
5	(England) Chris Adcock (England) Gabby Adcock	9	15
2	(Indonesia) Tontowi Ahmad (Indonesia) Liliyana Natsir	21	21

Final
1	(China) Zhang Nan (China) Zhao Yunlei	21	21
2	(Indonesia) Tontowi Ahmad (Indonesia) Liliyana Natsir	16	15

Preceded by 2014 Korea Open Super Series	Korea Open	Succeeded by 2016 Korea Open Super Series
Preceded by 2015 Japan Super Series	BWF Super Series; 2015 BWF Season	Succeeded by 2015 Denmark Super Series Premier
