= 2015 Chinese Taipei Masters Grand Prix =

Badminton championships

Tournament details
- Dates: 13 – 18 October 2015
- Level: Grand Prix
- Total prize money: US$50,000
- Venue: Xinzhuang Gymnasium
- Location: New Taipei City, Taiwan

Champions
- Men's singles: (Indonesia) Sony Dwi Kuncoro
- Women's singles: (South Korea) Lee Jang-mi
- Men's doubles: (Indonesia) Marcus Fernaldi Gideon (Indonesia) Kevin Sanjaya Sukamuljo
- Women's doubles: (Indonesia) Anggia Shitta Awanda (Indonesia) Ni Ketut Mahadewi Istirani
- Mixed doubles: (Indonesia) Ronald Alexander (Indonesia) Melati Daeva Oktaviani

The 2015 Chinese Taipei Masters Grand Prix was the fourteenth grand prix badminton tournament of the 2015 BWF Grand Prix and Grand Prix Gold. The tournament was held in Xinzhuang Gymnasium, New Taipei City, Taiwan October 13–18, 2015 and had a total prize of US$50,000.

== Men's singles ==
=== Seeds ===
1. (Vietnam) Nguyễn Tiến Minh (second round)
2. (Malaysia) Zulfadli Zulkiffli (third round)
3. (Indonesia) Jonatan Christie (third round)
4. (South Korea) Jeon Hyeok-jin (second round)
5. (Chinese Taipei) Wang Tzu-wei (final)
6. (Singapore) Derek Wong Zi Liang (third round)
7. (Indonesia) Ihsan Maulana Mustofa (semifinals)
8. (Japan) Riichi Takeshita (first round)
9. (Indonesia) Anthony Sinisuka Ginting (quarterfinals)
10. (Indonesia) Firman Abdul Kholik (second round)
11. (Thailand) Suppanyu Avihingsanon (second round)
12. (Chinese Taipei) Lin Yu-hsien (quarterfinals)
13. (India) Sameer Verma (second round)
14. (Malaysia) Tan Chun Seang (first round)
15. (Malaysia) Liew Daren (third round)
16. (Indonesia) Sony Dwi Kuncoro (champion)

=== Finals ===
Quarterfinals
(Indonesia) Simon Santoso	21	21
12	(Chinese Taipei) Lin Yu-hsien	12	19
(South Korea) Heo Kwang-hee	20	19
16	(Indonesia) Sony Dwi Kuncoro	22	21
5	(Chinese Taipei) Wang Tzu-wei	21	17	21
(Singapore) Loh Kean Yew	13	21	13
7	(Indonesia) Ihsan Maulana Mustofa	21	21
9	(Indonesia) Anthony Sinisuka Ginting	18	18

Semifinals
(Indonesia) Simon Santoso	14	16
16	(Indonesia) Sony Dwi Kuncoro	21	21
5	(Chinese Taipei) Wang Tzu-wei	21	8	21
7	(Indonesia) Ihsan Maulana Mustofa	10	21	15

Final
16	(Indonesia) Sony Dwi Kuncoro	21	21
5	(Chinese Taipei) Wang Tzu-wei	13	15

=== Top half ===
==== Section 1 ====
First Round
1	(Vietnam) Nguyễn Tiến Minh	21	21
Q5	(Chinese Taipei) Yang Chih-hsun	16	17
(United States) Lee Hock Lai	10	12
(Indonesia) Simon Santoso	21	21
13	(India) Sameer Verma	18	21	22
(Chinese Taipei) Liu Wei-chi	21	15	20
(Thailand) Khosit Phetpradab	21	21
(Malaysia) Zulhelmi Zulkiffli	12	13

Second Round
1	(Vietnam) Nguyễn Tiến Minh	20	21	13
(Indonesia) Simon Santoso	22	15	21
13	(India) Sameer Verma	17	23	12
(Thailand) Khosit Phetpradab	21	21	21

Third Round
(Indonesia) Simon Santoso	21	21
(Thailand) Khosit Phetpradab	13	13

==== Section 2 ====
First Round
6	(Singapore) Derek Wong Zi Liang	14	21	21
(Indonesia) Evert Sukamta	21	15	16
(Chinese Taipei) Yang Sheng-jie	21	8	9
(Indonesia) Muhammad Bayu Pangisthu	17	21	21
12	(Chinese Taipei) Lin Yu-hsien	21	21
Q3	(Indonesia) Yehezkiel Fritz Mainaky	15	11
(Chinese Taipei) Cheng Po-wei	21	21
Q7	(Chinese Taipei) Lee Chia-hao	10	14

Second Round
6	(Singapore) Derek Wong Zi Liang	21	14	21
(Indonesia) Muhammad Bayu Pangisthu	19	21	17
12	(Chinese Taipei) Lin Yu-hsien	21	21
(Chinese Taipei) Cheng Po-wei	17	13

Third Round
6	(Singapore) Derek Wong Zi Liang	13	17
12	(Chinese Taipei) Lin Yu-hsien	21	21

==== Section 3 ====
First Round
3	(Indonesia) Jonatan Christie	21	21
(Chinese Taipei) Hsu Jui-ting	12	13
(Malaysia) Muhammad Hafiz Hashim	w	/	o
(Chinese Taipei) Chen Chun-wei
14	(Malaysia) Tan Chun Seang	w	/	o
(South Korea) Heo Kwang-hee
(South Korea) Kim Dong-hoon	8	21
(Chinese Taipei) Lu Chia-hung	21	23

Second Round
3	(Indonesia) Jonatan Christie	21	21
(Chinese Taipei) Chen Chun-wei	16	8
(South Korea) Heo Kwang-hee	18	21	21
(Chinese Taipei) Lu Chia-hung	21	8	9

Third Round
3	(Indonesia) Jonatan Christie	16	21	10
(South Korea) Heo Kwang-hee	21	11	21

==== Section 4 ====
First Round
8	(Japan) Riichi Takeshita	21	21	17
(Chinese Taipei) Shih Kuei-chun	10	23	21
(Hong Kong) Tam Chun Hei	15	21	16
(Japan) Yosei Yamaguchi	21	14	21
16	(Indonesia) Sony Dwi Kuncoro	21	21
(Thailand) Adulrach Namkul	5	18
(Chinese Taipei) Hsueh Hsuan-yi	21	21
Q8	(Japan) Yugo Kobayashi	14	12

Second Round
(Chinese Taipei) Shih Kuei-chun	21	21
(Japan) Yosei Yamaguchi	14	9
16	(Indonesia) Sony Dwi Kuncoro	21	27
(Chinese Taipei) Hsueh Hsuan-yi	17	25

Third Round
(Chinese Taipei) Shih Kuei-chun	16	18
16	(Indonesia) Sony Dwi Kuncoro	21	21

=== Bottom half ===
==== Section 5 ====
First Round
(Japan) Kanta Tsuneyama	21	21
(Malaysia) Lim Chi Wing	15	10
(Trinidad and Tobago) Nicholas Bonkowsky	11	9
15	(Malaysia) Liew Daren	21	21
(Chinese Taipei) Yang Yi-hsiang	21	16	21
(Japan) Hashiru Shimono	18	21	17
(Malaysia) Yeoh Kay Ee	4	5
5	(Chinese Taipei) Wang Tzu-wei	21	21

Second Round
(Japan) Kanta Tsuneyama	16	15
15	(Malaysia) Liew Daren	21	21
(Chinese Taipei) Yang Yi-hsiang	21	14	19
5	(Chinese Taipei) Wang Tzu-wei	10	21	21

Third Round
15	(Malaysia) Liew Daren	16	21	11
5	(Chinese Taipei) Wang Tzu-wei	21	18	21

==== Section 6 ====
First Round
(Chinese Taipei) Lo Chi-yu	15	5
(Singapore) Loh Kean Yew	21	21
(Canada) Timothy Chiu	13	10
10	(Indonesia) Firman Abdul Kholik	21	21
(Indonesia) Kho Henrikho Wibowo	21	15	16
(Chinese Taipei) Kuo Ching-hung	12	21	21
(Chinese Taipei) Lin Chia-hsuan	10	10
4	(South Korea) Jeon Hyeok-jin	21	21

Second Round
(Singapore) Loh Kean Yew	17	21	21
10	(Indonesia) Firman Abdul Kholik	21	14	15
(Chinese Taipei) Kuo Ching-hung	18	23	22
4	(South Korea) Jeon Hyeok-jin	21	21	20

Third Round
(Singapore) Loh Kean Yew	21	21
(Chinese Taipei) Kuo Ching-hung	11	15

==== Section 7 ====
First Round
(Chinese Taipei) Kuo Po-cheng	14	14
(Hong Kong) Lee Cheuk Yiu	21	21
Q2	(Chinese Taipei) Teng Shih-hua	20	16
11	(Thailand) Suppanyu Avihingsanon	22	21
(South Korea) Seo Seung-jae	21	13	21
PFQ	(Chinese Taipei) Chu Han-chou	6	21	13
(Hong Kong) Chan Yan Kit	15	20
7	(Indonesia) Ihsan Maulana Mustofa	21	22

Second Round
(Hong Kong) Lee Cheuk Yiu	22	21	21
11	(Thailand) Suppanyu Avihingsanon	24	15	12
(South Korea) Seo Seung-jae	21	21	9
7	(Indonesia) Ihsan Maulana Mustofa	23	14	21

Third Round
(Hong Kong) Lee Cheuk Yiu	21	11	14
7	(Indonesia) Ihsan Maulana Mustofa	15	21	21

==== Section 8 ====
First Round
(Chinese Taipei) Yang Chih-chieh	15	10
(Malaysia) Chong Yee Han	21	21
Q4	(Japan) Tatsuya Watanabe	15	16
9	(Indonesia) Anthony Sinisuka Ginting	21	21
Q1	Bye
Q6	(Chinese Taipei) Hsieh Feng-tse
(Indonesia) Reksy Aureza Megananda	19	23	14
2	(Malaysia) Zulfadli Zulkiffli	21	21	21

Second Round
(Malaysia) Chong Yee Han	21	17	18
9	(Indonesia) Anthony Sinisuka Ginting	12	21	21
Q6	(Chinese Taipei) Hsieh Feng-tse	10	11
2	(Malaysia) Zulfadli Zulkiffli	21	21

Third Round
9	(Indonesia) Anthony Sinisuka Ginting	22	13
2	(Malaysia) Zulfadli Zulkiffli	20	7^{r}

== Women's singles ==
=== Seeds ===
1. (South Korea) Kim Hyo-min (final)
2. (Singapore) Chen Jiayuan (semifinals)
3. (Indonesia) Hanna Ramadini (withdrawn)
4. (Chinese Taipei) Cheng Chi-ya (quarterfinals)
5. (Vietnam) Vũ Thị Trang (semifinals)
6. (Indonesia) Bellaetrix Manuputty (second round)
7. (Japan) Kana Ito (first round)
8. (Indonesia) Gregoria Mariska Tunjung (first round)

=== Finals ===
Semifinals
1	(South Korea) Kim Hyo-min	21	21
5	(Vietnam) Vũ Thị Trang	16	14
(South Korea) Lee Jang-mi	12	21	21
2	(Singapore) Chen Jiayuan	21	14	14

Final
1	(South Korea) Kim Hyo-min	16	16
(South Korea) Lee Jang-mi	21	21

=== Top half ===
==== Section 1 ====
First Round
1	(South Korea) Kim Hyo-min	21	21
Q1	(Chinese Taipei) Tang Wan-yi	11	14
(Thailand) Thamolwan Poopradubsil	22	21	12
(Chinese Taipei) Chiang Mei-hui	24	14	21
7	(Japan) Kana Ito	11	19
(Singapore) Liang Xiaoyu	21	21
(Malaysia) Julia Wong Pei Xian	17	21	16
(Chinese Taipei) Hung Shih-han	21	11	21

Second Round
1	(South Korea) Kim Hyo-min	21	22
(Chinese Taipei) Chiang Mei-hui	9	20
(Singapore) Liang Xiaoyu	16	21	21
(Chinese Taipei) Hung Shih-han	21	17	7

Quarterfinals
1	(South Korea) Kim Hyo-min	21	21
(Singapore) Liang Xiaoyu	19	13

==== Section 2 ====
First Round
PFQ	(Chinese Taipei) Hu Ling-fang	21	21
(Malaysia) Yang Li Lian	19	12
Q3	(South Korea) Kim Ye-ji	21	21
Q2	(Japan) Aoi Matsuda	11	18
5	(Vietnam) Vũ Thị Trang	21	21
(Indonesia) Lyanny Alessandra Mainaky	8	10
PFQ	(Chinese Taipei) Liang Ting-yu	20	21	18
(Chinese Taipei) Yu Chien-hui	22	7	21

Second Round
PFQ	(Chinese Taipei) Hu Ling-fang	21	14	10
Q3	(South Korea) Kim Ye-ji	19	21	21
5	(Vietnam) Vũ Thị Trang	21	15	21
(Chinese Taipei) Yu Chien-hui	15	21	5

Quarterfinals
Q3	(South Korea) Kim Ye-ji	16	13
5	(Vietnam) Vũ Thị Trang	21	21

=== Bottom half ===
==== Section 3 ====
First Round
(Japan) Ayumi Mine	19	20
(South Korea) Kim Na-young	21	22
(South Korea) Lee Jang-mi	21	21
8	(Indonesia) Gregoria Mariska Tunjung	12	13
(Malaysia) Lim Chiew Sien	21	11	22
(Indonesia) Fitriani	12	21	20
Q4	(Chinese Taipei) Jhou Shih-jyun	21	16	12
4	(Chinese Taipei) Cheng Chi-ya	15	21	21

Second Round
(South Korea) Kim Na-young	16	19
(South Korea) Lee Jang-mi	21	21
(Malaysia) Lim Chiew Sien	13	19
4	(Chinese Taipei) Cheng Chi-ya	21	21

Quarterfinals
(South Korea) Lee Jang-mi	16	21	21
4	(Chinese Taipei) Cheng Chi-ya	21	16	17

==== Section 4 ====
First Round
PFQ	(Chinese Taipei) Lin Ying-chun	21	9	14
(Chinese Taipei) Sung Shuo-yun	15	21	21
(Australia) Wendy Chen Hsuan-yu	19	11
6	(Indonesia) Bellaetrix Manuputty	21	21
(Indonesia) Yulia Yosephine Susanto	11	17
(Chinese Taipei) Lee Chia-hsin	21	21
(Malaysia) Lim Yin Fun	22	17
2	(Singapore) Chen Jiayuan	24	21

Second Round
(Chinese Taipei) Sung Shuo-yun	15
6	(Indonesia) Bellaetrix Manuputty	16^{r}
(Chinese Taipei) Lee Chia-hsin	22	21	13
2	(Singapore) Chen Jiayuan	20	23	21

Quarterfinals
(Chinese Taipei) Sung Shuo-yun	9	9
2	(Singapore) Chen Jiayuan	21	21

== Men's doubles ==
=== Seeds ===
1. (Indonesia) Marcus Fernaldi Gideon / Kevin Sanjaya Sukamuljo (champion)
2. (Indonesia) Berry Angriawan / Rian Agung Saputro (first round)
3. (Indonesia) Fajar Alfian / Muhammad Rian Ardianto (first round)
4. (Malaysia) Hoon Thien How / Lim Khim Wah (final)
5. (Japan) Takuro Hoki / Yugo Kobayashi (semifinals)
6. (South Korea) Jun Bong-chan / Kim Dae-eun (second round)
7. (Chinese Taipei) Lee Jhe-huei / Lee Yang (quarterfinals)
8. (Japan) Taiki Shimada / Yoshinori Takeuchi (second round)

=== Finals ===
Semifinals
1	(Indonesia) Markus Fernaldi Gideon (Indonesia) Kevin Sanjaya Sukamuljo	17	21	22
5	(Japan) Takuro Hoki (Japan) Yugo Kobayashi	21	13	20
4	(Malaysia) Hoon Thien How (Malaysia) Lim Khim Wah	21	21
(Hong Kong) Chan Tsz Kit (Hong Kong) Law Cheuk Him	18	13

Final
1	(Indonesia) Markus Fernaldi Gideon (Indonesia) Kevin Sanjaya Sukamuljo	21	21
4	(Malaysia) Hoon Thien How (Malaysia) Lim Khim Wah	12	8

=== Top half ===
==== Section 1 ====
First Round
1	(Indonesia) Markus Fernaldi Gideon (Indonesia) Kevin Sanjaya Sukamuljo	21	21
(Hong Kong) Or Chin Chung (Hong Kong) Tang Chun Man	15	16
(Singapore) Terry Hee Yong Kai (Singapore) Loh Kean Hean	21	20	17
(Chinese Taipei) Chang Ko-chi (Chinese Taipei) Chen Chung-jen	14	22	21
7	(Chinese Taipei) Lee Jhe-huei (Chinese Taipei) Lee Yang	21	21
(India) Vineeth Manuel (India) S. Sanjeeth	9	13
(Netherlands) Ruud Bosch (Australia) Oliver Leydon-Davis	17	21	21
(Chinese Taipei) Hung Tzu-wei (Chinese Taipei) Lin Yu-feng	21	15	17

Second Round
1	(Indonesia) Markus Fernaldi Gideon (Indonesia) Kevin Sanjaya Sukamuljo	21	21
(Chinese Taipei) Chang Ko-chi (Chinese Taipei) Chen Chung-jen	10	13
7	(Chinese Taipei) Lee Jhe-huei (Chinese Taipei) Lee Yang	21	21
(Netherlands) Ruud Bosch (Australia) Oliver Leydon-Davis	11	19

Quarterfinals
1	(Indonesia) Markus Fernaldi Gideon (Indonesia) Kevin Sanjaya Sukamuljo	21	21
7	(Chinese Taipei) Lee Jhe-huei (Chinese Taipei) Lee Yang	18	19

==== Section 2 ====
First Round
3	(Indonesia) Fajar Alfian (Indonesia) Muhammad Rian Ardianto	19	14
(Malaysia) Tan Wee Gieen (Malaysia) Teo Ee Yi	21	21
(Chinese Taipei) Po Li-wei (Chinese Taipei) Yang Ming-tse	21	9	21
(Malaysia) Low Juan Shen (Malaysia) Ong Yew Sin	19	21	15
5	(Japan) Takuro Hoki (Japan) Yugo Kobayashi	21	21
(Chinese Taipei) Hsu Wei-pin (Chinese Taipei) Su Cheng-heng	9	19
(Chinese Taipei) Liao Chi-hung (Chinese Taipei) Liao I-liang	13	18
(South Korea) Chung Eui-seok (South Korea) Kim Duk-young	21	21

Second Round
(Malaysia) Tan Wee Gieen (Malaysia) Teo Ee Yi	22	21
(Chinese Taipei) Po Li-wei (Chinese Taipei) Yang Ming-tse	20	18
5	(Japan) Takuro Hoki (Japan) Yugo Kobayashi	21	21
(South Korea) Chung Eui-seok (South Korea) Kim Duk-young	15	15

Quarterfinals
(Malaysia) Tan Wee Gieen (Malaysia) Teo Ee Yi	14	19
5	(Japan) Takuro Hoki (Japan) Yugo Kobayashi	21	21

=== Bottom half ===
==== Section 3 ====
First Round
(Chinese Taipei) Hung Ying-yuan (Chinese Taipei) Lin Shang-kai	16	10
(Thailand) Wannawat Ampunsuwan (Thailand) Tinn Isriyanate	21	21
Q1	(Hong Kong) Chang Tak Ching (Hong Kong) Yeung Shin Choi	17	22	10
8	(Japan) Taiki Shimada (Japan) Yoshinori Takeuchi	21	20	21
(Chinese Taipei) Liu Wei-chen (Chinese Taipei) Yang Po-han	17	21	17
Q2	(Chinese Taipei) Liao Kuan-hao (Chinese Taipei) Lu Chia-pin	21	18	21
(Hong Kong) Dick Chan Long (Hong Kong) Ho Wai Lun	13	7
4	(Malaysia) Hoon Thien How (Malaysia) Lim Khim Wah	21	21

Second Round
(Thailand) Wannawat Ampunsuwan (Thailand) Tinn Isriyanate	21	23	21
8	(Japan) Taiki Shimada (Japan) Yoshinori Takeuchi	12	25	18
Q2	(Chinese Taipei) Liao Kuan-hao (Chinese Taipei) Lu Chia-pin	14	17
4	(Malaysia) Hoon Thien How (Malaysia) Lim Khim Wah	21	21

Quarterfinals
(Thailand) Wannawat Ampunsuwan (Thailand) Tinn Isriyanate	18	14
4	(Malaysia) Hoon Thien How (Malaysia) Lim Khim Wah	21	21

==== Section 4 ====
First Round
(Hong Kong) Chan Tsz Kit (Hong Kong) Law Cheuk Him	21	21
(Chinese Taipei) Huang Po-jui (Chinese Taipei) Tien Tzu-chieh	10	19
Q4	(Chinese Taipei) Shang Tung-yuan (Chinese Taipei) Wang Chih-hao	18	11
6	(South Korea) Jun Bong-chan (South Korea) Kim Dae-eun	21	21
(Chinese Taipei) Ou Jardon (Chinese Taipei) Yang Po-hsuan	21	13	19
Q3	(Chinese Taipei) Lee Chia-han (Chinese Taipei) Liang Jui-wei	14	21	21
(Japan) Kohei Gondo (Japan) Tatsuya Watanabe	17	21	21
2	(Indonesia) Berry Angriawan (Indonesia) Rian Agung Saputro	21	18	10

Second Round
(Hong Kong) Chan Tsz Kit (Hong Kong) Law Cheuk Him	21	21
6	(South Korea) Jun Bong-chan (South Korea) Kim Dae-eun	19	13
Q3	(Chinese Taipei) Lee Chia-han (Chinese Taipei) Liang Jui-wei	22	13	21
(Japan) Kohei Gondo (Japan) Tatsuya Watanabe	20	21	17

Quarterfinals
(Hong Kong) Chan Tsz Kit (Hong Kong) Law Cheuk Him	21	21
Q3	(Chinese Taipei) Lee Chia-han (Chinese Taipei) Liang Jui-wei	19	11

== Women's doubles ==
=== Seeds ===
1. (Japan) Yuki Fukushima / Sayaka Hirota (semifinals)
2. (Indonesia) Suci Rizky Andini / Maretha Dea Giovani (second round)
3. (Malaysia) Lim Yin Loo / Lee Meng Yean (second round)
4. (Indonesia) Anggia Shitta Awanda / Ni Ketut Mahadewi Istirani (champion)

=== Finals ===
Semifinals
1	(Japan) Yuki Fukushima (Japan) Sayaka Hirota	21	17	19
4	(Indonesia) Anggia Shitta Awanda (Indonesia) Ni Ketut Mahadewi Istirani	12	21	21
(Indonesia) Gebby Ristiyani Imawan (Indonesia) Tiara Rosalia Nuraidah	21	18	17
(Japan) Shiho Tanaka (Japan) Koharu Yonemoto	17	21	21

Final
4	(Indonesia) Anggia Shitta Awanda (Indonesia) Ni Ketut Mahadewi Istirani	21	21
(Japan) Shiho Tanaka (Japan) Koharu Yonemoto	19	14

=== Top half ===
==== Section 1 ====
First Round
1	(Japan) Yuki Fukushima (Japan) Sayaka Hirota
Bye
(Malaysia) Goh Yea Ching (Malaysia) Yap Zhen	21	12	21
(Chinese Taipei) Hsieh Pei-shan (Chinese Taipei) Lee Chih-chen	14	21	14
(Chinese Taipei) Yang Ching-tun (Chinese Taipei) Ye Jing-ya
Bye
(Chinese Taipei) Lin Ying-chun (Chinese Taipei) Liu Hsi-hsia	9	11
(Japan) Rie Etoh (Japan) Aoi Matsuda	21	21

Second Round
1	(Japan) Yuki Fukushima (Japan) Sayaka Hirota	21	21
(Malaysia) Goh Yea Ching (Malaysia) Yap Zhen	16	8
(Chinese Taipei) Yang Ching-tun (Chinese Taipei) Ye Jing-ya	14	6
(Japan) Rie Etoh (Japan) Aoi Matsuda	21	21

Quarterfinals
1	(Japan) Yuki Fukushima (Japan) Sayaka Hirota	21	21
(Japan) Rie Etoh (Japan) Aoi Matsuda	11	18

==== Section 2 ====
First Round
4	(Indonesia) Anggia Shitta Awanda (Indonesia) Ni Ketut Mahadewi Istirani
Bye
(Chinese Taipei) Chang Ya-han (Chinese Taipei) Wang Pei-rong	w	/	o
(Chinese Taipei) Lee Wei-tzu (Chinese Taipei) Yu Min-ju
(Chinese Taipei) Chen Wan-ting (Chinese Taipei) Jhou Shih-jyun	21	21
(Chinese Taipei) Chen Su-yu (Chinese Taipei) Huang Yu-ting	14	11
(Chinese Taipei) Chiang Kai-hsin (Chinese Taipei) Wu Fang-chien	11	21	21
(Hong Kong) Kaka Chan Tsz Ka (Hong Kong) Yuen Sin Ying	21	19	15

Second Round
4	(Indonesia) Anggia Shitta Awanda (Indonesia) Ni Ketut Mahadewi Istirani	21	21
(Chinese Taipei) Lee Wei-tzu (Chinese Taipei) Yu Min-ju	10	11
(Chinese Taipei) Chen Wan-ting (Chinese Taipei) Jhou Shih-jyun	16	11
(Chinese Taipei) Chiang Kai-hsin (Chinese Taipei) Wu Fang-chien	21	21

Quarterfinals
4	(Indonesia) Anggia Shitta Awanda (Indonesia) Ni Ketut Mahadewi Istirani	16	21	21
(Chinese Taipei) Chiang Kai-hsin (Chinese Taipei) Wu Fang-chien	21	14	8

=== Bottom half ===
==== Section 3 ====
First Round
(Indonesia) Gebby Ristiyani Imawan (Indonesia) Tiara Rosalia Nuraidah	21	21
(Chinese Taipei) Hung Shih-chieh (Chinese Taipei) Hung Shih-han	6	11
(Chinese Taipei) Li Min-hsuan (Chinese Taipei) Tai Wei-ling	16	12
(Chinese Taipei) Lin Tsun-yu (Chinese Taipei) Kuo Yu-wen	21	21
(Chinese Taipei) Chiu Yi-ju (Chinese Taipei) Liu Hsiao-jo	14	13
(Chinese Taipei) Cheng Chi-ya (Chinese Taipei) Lee Chia-hsin	21	21
Bye
3	(Malaysia) Lim Yin Loo (Malaysia) Lee Meng Yean

Second Round
(Indonesia) Gebby Ristiyani Imawan (Indonesia) Tiara Rosalia Nuraidah	21	21
(Chinese Taipei) Lin Tsun-yu (Chinese Taipei) Kuo Yu-wen	11	19
(Chinese Taipei) Cheng Chi-ya (Chinese Taipei) Lee Chia-hsin	23	21
3	(Malaysia) Lim Yin Loo (Malaysia) Lee Meng Yean	21	18

Quarterfinals
(Indonesia) Gebby Ristiyani Imawan (Indonesia) Tiara Rosalia Nuraidah	16	21	21
(Chinese Taipei) Cheng Chi-ya (Chinese Taipei) Lee Chia-hsin	21	16	9

==== Section 4 ====
First Round
(Japan) Shiho Tanaka (Japan) Koharu Yonemoto	21	21
(Chinese Taipei) Lin Wan-ching (Chinese Taipei) Lin Xiao-min	11	13
Bye
(Chinese Taipei) Cheng Yu-chieh (Chinese Taipei) Hu Ling-fang
(Chinese Taipei) Hsiao Yu-min (Chinese Taipei) Yeh Chiu-yu	15	12
(South Korea) Kim Hye-rin (South Korea) Kong Hee-yong	21	21
Bye
2	(Indonesia) Suci Rizky Andini (Indonesia) Maretha Dea Giovani

Second Round
(Japan) Shiho Tanaka (Japan) Koharu Yonemoto	21	21
(Chinese Taipei) Cheng Yu-chieh (Chinese Taipei) Hu Ling-fang	17	19
(South Korea) Kim Hye-rin (South Korea) Kong Hee-yong	21	25
2	(Indonesia) Suci Rizky Andini (Indonesia) Maretha Dea Giovani	16	23

Quarterfinals
(Japan) Shiho Tanaka (Japan) Koharu Yonemoto	21	23
(South Korea) Kim Hye-rin (South Korea) Kong Hee-yong	13	21

== Mixed doubles ==
=== Seeds ===
1. (Indonesia) Ronald Alexander / Melati Daeva Oktaviani (champion)
2. (Malaysia) Tan Chee Tean / Shevon Jemie Lai (quarterfinals)
3. (Indonesia) Alfian Eko Prasetya / Annisa Saufika (second round)
4. (Singapore) Terry Hee Yong Kai / Tan Wei Han (second round)

=== Finals ===
Semifinals
1	(Indonesia) Ronald Alexander (Indonesia) Melati Daeva Oktaviani	21	21
(Malaysia) Tan Kian Meng (Malaysia) Peck Yen Wei	8	13
(Indonesia) Muhammad Rian Ardianto (Indonesia) Masita Mahmudin	12	16
(Chinese Taipei) Chang Ko-chi (Chinese Taipei) Chang Hsin-tien	21	21

Final
1	(Indonesia) Ronald Alexander (Indonesia) Melati Daeva Oktaviani	21	25	21
(Chinese Taipei) Chang Ko-chi (Chinese Taipei) Chang Hsin-tien	18	27	15

=== Top half ===
==== Section 1 ====
First Round
1	(Indonesia) Ronald Alexander (Indonesia) Melati Daeva Oktaviani
Bye
(Chinese Taipei) Liao Chi-hung (Chinese Taipei) Chiang Ya-ting	11	13
(Hong Kong) Law Cheuk Him (Hong Kong) Yuen Sin Ying	21	21
(Hong Kong) Or Chin Chung (Hong Kong) Kaka Chan Tsz Ka	21	14	21
(Chinese Taipei) Lu Ching-yao (Chinese Taipei) Chiang Kai-hsin	17	21	18
(Hong Kong) Yeung Shing Choi (Hong Kong) Cheung Ying Mei	18	21	19
(Chinese Taipei) Hsu Jui-ting (Chinese Taipei) Lee Wei-tzu	21	17	21

Second Round
1	(Indonesia) Ronald Alexander (Indonesia) Melati Daeva Oktaviani	21	21
(Hong Kong) Law Cheuk Him (Hong Kong) Yuen Sin Ying	7	14
(Hong Kong) Or Chin Chung (Hong Kong) Kaka Chan Tsz Ka	21	21
(Chinese Taipei) Hsu Jui-ting (Chinese Taipei) Lee Wei-tzu	15	13

Quarterfinals
1	(Indonesia) Ronald Alexander (Indonesia) Melati Daeva Oktaviani	21	21
(Hong Kong) Or Chin Chung (Hong Kong) Kaka Chan Tsz Ka	11	18

==== Section 2 ====
First Round
4	(Singapore) Terry Hee Yong Kai (Singapore) Tan Wei Han	21	21
(Japan) Kohei Gondo (Japan) Sayaka Hirota	18	19
(Chinese Taipei) Lee Yang (Chinese Taipei) Kuo Yu-wen	21	21
(South Korea) Chung Eui-seok (South Korea) Kong Hee-yong	11	15
(Malaysia) Tan Kian Meng (Malaysia) Peck Yen Wei	21	21
(Chinese Taipei) Huang Po-jui (Chinese Taipei) Shuai Pei-ling	19	17
(Indonesia) Yehezkiel Fritz Mainaky (Indonesia) Lyanny Alessandra Mainaky	17	9
(Chinese Taipei) Hung Ying-yuan (Chinese Taipei) Hsieh Pei-shan	21	21

Second Round
4	(Singapore) Terry Hee Yong Kai (Singapore) Tan Wei Han	16	18
(Chinese Taipei) Lee Yang (Chinese Taipei) Kuo Yu-wen	21	21
(Malaysia) Tan Kian Meng (Malaysia) Peck Yen Wei	23	21
(Chinese Taipei) Hung Ying-yuan (Chinese Taipei) Hsieh Pei-shan	21	13

Quarterfinals
(Chinese Taipei) Lee Yang (Chinese Taipei) Kuo Yu-wen	15	15
(Malaysia) Tan Kian Meng (Malaysia) Peck Yen Wei	21	21

=== Bottom half ===
==== Section 3 ====
First Round
(Chinese Taipei) Yang Po-han (Chinese Taipei) Yang Ching-tun	21	21
(Indonesia) Hafiz Faisal (Indonesia) Shella Devi Aulia	17	12
(Hong Kong) Tang Chun Man (Hong Kong) Ng Wing Yung	16	21	12
(Chinese Taipei) Yang Po-hsuan (Chinese Taipei) Wu Yu-lun	21	13	21
(Chinese Taipei) Chiang Yu-wei (Chinese Taipei) Chang Ya-han	w	/	o
(Indonesia) Muhammad Rian Ardianto (Indonesia) Masita Mahmudin
(Chinese Taipei) Liang Jui-wei (Chinese Taipei) Cheng Yu-chieh	19	18
3	(Indonesia) Alfian Eko Prasetya (Indonesia) Annisa Saufika	21	21

Second Round
(Chinese Taipei) Yang Po-han (Chinese Taipei) Yang Ching-tun	18	18
(Chinese Taipei) Yang Po-hsuan (Chinese Taipei) Wu Yu-lun	21	21
(Indonesia) Muhammad Rian Ardianto (Indonesia) Masita Mahmudin	12	21	21
3	(Indonesia) Alfian Eko Prasetya (Indonesia) Annisa Saufika	21	14	18

Quarterfinals
(Chinese Taipei) Yang Po-hsuan (Chinese Taipei) Wu Yu-lun	18	19
(Indonesia) Muhammad Rian Ardianto (Indonesia) Masita Mahmudin	21	21

==== Section 4 ====
First Round
(Malaysia) Tan Yip Jiun (Malaysia) Yang Li Lian	15	19
(Chinese Taipei) Chang Ko-chi (Chinese Taipei) Chang Hsin-tien	21	21
(Japan) Yugo Kobayashi (Japan) Yuki Fukushima	21	21
(Chinese Taipei) Liu Wei-chen (Chinese Taipei) Huang Mei-ching	10	16
(Chinese Taipei) Chen Chung-jen (Chinese Taipei) Chang Ching-hui	18	20
(South Korea) Jun Bong-chan (South Korea) Kim Hye-rin	21	22
Bye
2	(Malaysia) Tan Chee Tean (Malaysia) Shevon Jemie Lai

Second Round
(Chinese Taipei) Chang Ko-chi (Chinese Taipei) Chang Hsin-tien	21	21
(Japan) Yugo Kobayashi (Japan) Yuki Fukushima	17	16
(South Korea) Jun Bong-chan (South Korea) Kim Hye-rin	12	17
2	(Malaysia) Tan Chee Tean (Malaysia) Shevon Jemie Lai	21	21

Quarterfinals
(Chinese Taipei) Chang Ko-chi (Chinese Taipei) Chang Hsin-tien	21	19	21
2	(Malaysia) Tan Chee Tean (Malaysia) Shevon Jemie Lai	19	21	15

== See also ==
- List of sporting events in Taiwan

Preceded by 2015 Dutch Open Grand Prix	BWF Grand Prix and Grand Prix Gold; 2015 BWF Season	Succeeded by 2015 Bitburger Open Grand Prix Gold
