= Law Cheuk Him =

Hong Kong badminton player

Law Cheuk Him 羅卓謙
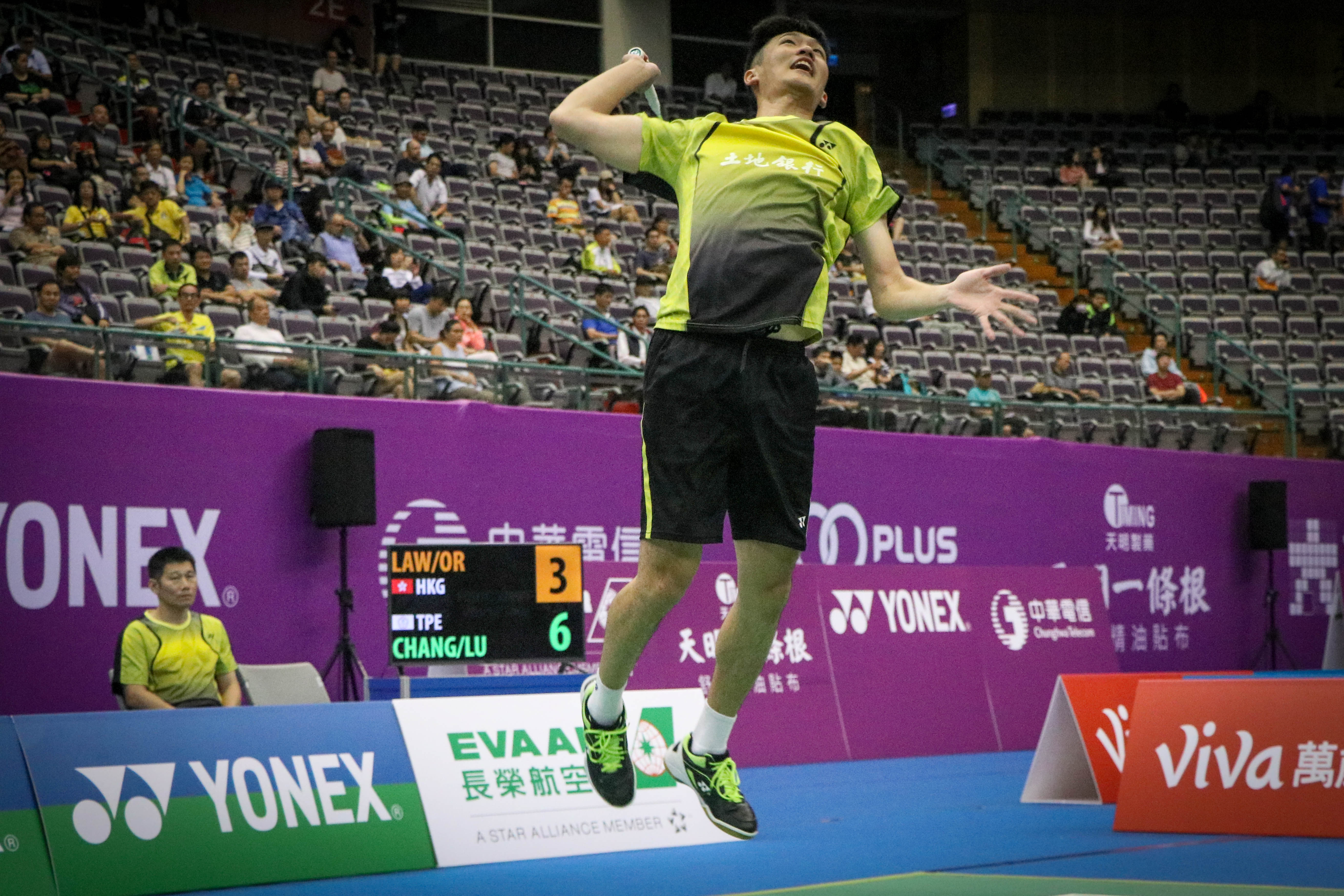
- Law at the 2018 Chinese Taipei Open

Personal information
- Born: 26 June 1994 (age 32) Hong Kong
- Years active: 2009–present
- Height: 1.86 m (6 ft 1 in)

Sport
- Country: Hong Kong
- Sport: Badminton
- Handedness: Left

Men's & mixed doubles
- Highest ranking: 26 (MD with Lee Chun Hei, 15 June 2017); 74 (XD with Yeung Nga Ting, 29 November 2022)
- BWF profile

Law Cheuk Him (Chinese: 羅卓謙; pinyin: Luó Zhuōqiān; Jyutping: lo4 zoek3 him1, born 26 February 1994) is a Hong Kong badminton player. He won the 2021 Bahrain International Challenge mixed doubles title with Yeung Nga Ting.

== Early life ==
Before graduating, Law studied at the S.T.F.A. Wu Siu Kui Memorial Primary School and the Yan Oi Tong Tin Ka Ping Secondary School in Tuen Mun District, Hong Kong.

== Career ==
Law represented Hong Kong in the 2014 Asian Games men's team event. In 2015, he reached the semifinals of the Chinese Taipei Masters Grand Prix with partner Chan Tsz Kit.

Law later partnered with World Championship bronze medalist Lee Chun Hei and they both entered a career-high ranking of 26 in men's doubles in 2017. Law and Lee were also runners-up at the 2022 Slovak Open. He also plays mixed doubles and partners with Yeung Nga Ting. They got into two consecutive tournament finals in Bahrain and won their first title there.

== Achievements ==
=== BWF International Challenge/Series (1 title, 2 runners-up) ===
Men's doubles
| Year | Tournament | Partner | Opponent | Score | Result |
|---|---|---|---|---|---|
| 2022 | Slovak Open | (Hong Kong) Lee Chun Hei | (Malaysia) Boon Xin Yuan (Malaysia) Wong Tien Ci | 18–21, 21–14, 19–21 | (silver) Runner-up |

Mixed doubles
| Year | Tournament | Partner | Opponent | Score | Result |
|---|---|---|---|---|---|
| 2021 | Bahrain International | (Hong Kong) Yeung Nga Ting | (Hong Kong) Lee Chun Hei (Hong Kong) Ng Tsz Yau | 21–23, 12–21 | (silver) Runner-up |
| 2021 | Bahrain International Challenge | (Hong Kong) Yeung Nga Ting | (Indonesia) Akbar Bintang Cahyono (Indonesia) Winny Oktavina Kandow | 11–21, 21–13, 21–11 | (gold) Winner |

BWF International Challenge tournament
BWF International Series tournament
BWF Future Series tournament
