= Chang Hsin-tien =

Taiwanese badminton player (born 1996)

Chang Hsin-tien 張莘恬
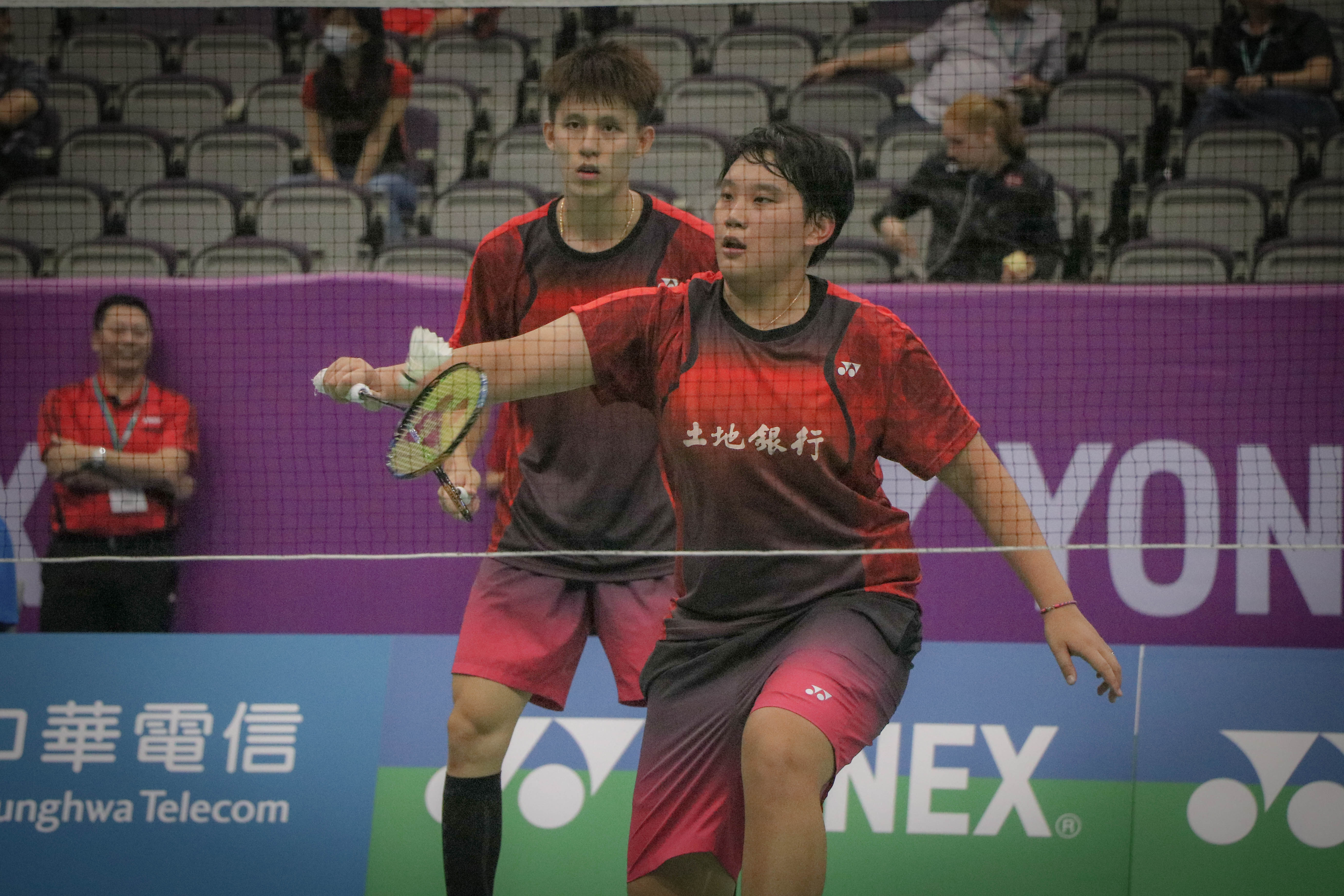

Personal information
- Born: 11 April 1996 (age 30) Taipei, Taiwan
- Height: 1.69 m (5 ft 7 in)

Sport
- Country: Republic of China (Taiwan)
- Sport: Badminton
- Handedness: Right

Women's & mixed doubles
- Highest ranking: 76 (WD 21 December 2017); 28 (XD 20 April 2017)
- BWF profile
Medal record
Women's badminton
Representing Chinese Taipei
Asian Junior Championships
Bronze medal – third place	2014 Taipei	Mixed team

Chang Hsin-tien (Chinese: 張莘恬; born 11 April 1996) is a Taiwanese badminton player.

== Career ==
She plays mixed doubles with Chang Ko-chi. Together they were the runner up at the 2015 Chinese Taipei Masters Grand Prix losing there to the Indonesian pair Ronald Alexander and Melati Daeva Oktavianti in the finals.

== Achievements ==
=== BWF Grand Prix ===
The BWF Grand Prix had two levels, the Grand Prix and Grand Prix Gold. It was a series of badminton tournaments sanctioned by the Badminton World Federation (BWF) and played between 2007 and 2017.

Mixed doubles
Year	Tournament	Partner	Opponent	Score	Result
2015	Chinese Taipei Masters	(Chinese Taipei) Chang Ko-chi	(Indonesia) Ronald Alexander (Indonesia) Melati Daeva Oktavianti	18–21, 27–25, 15–21	(silver) Runner-up

BWF Grand Prix Gold tournament
BWF Grand Prix tournament

=== BWF International Challenge/Series ===
Women's doubles
Year	Tournament	Partner	Opponent	Score	Result
2014	Auckland International	(Chinese Taipei) Chang Ching-hui	(Australia) Leanne Choo (Australia) Gronya Somerville	6–11, 11–8, 11–10, 11–9	(gold) Winner
2017	Polish Open	(Chinese Taipei) Yu Chien-hui	(Indonesia) Yulfira Barkah (Indonesia) Meirisa Cindy Sahputri	12–21, 21–14, 14–21	(silver) Runner-up

Mixed doubles
Year	Tournament	Partner	Opponent	Score	Result
2015	Auckland International	(Chinese Taipei) Wu Yuan-cheng	(Chinese Taipei) Lee Chia-han (Chinese Taipei) Lee Chia-hsin	8–21, 15–21	(silver) Runner-up
2016	Italian International	(Chinese Taipei) Chang Ko-chi	(France) Jordan Corvée (France) Anne Tran	13–21, 21–17, 17–21	(silver) Runner-up
2017	Orléans International	(Chinese Taipei) Chang Ko-chi	(Germany) Mark Lamsfuß (Germany) Isabel Herttrich	9–21, 15–21	(silver) Runner-up

BWF International Challenge tournament
BWF International Series tournament
BWF Future Series tournament
