= Lee Jang-mi =

South Korean badminton player (born 1994)

Personal information
- Born: 25 August 1994 (age 32) Busan, South Korea
- Height: 1.68 m (5 ft 6 in)

Sport
- Country: South Korea
- Sport: Badminton
- Handedness: Right

Women's singles
- Highest ranking: 15 (15 March 2018)
- Current ranking: 458 (27 December 2022)
- BWF profile
Medal record
Women's badminton
Representing South Korea
Sudirman Cup
Gold medal – first place	2017 Gold Coast	Mixed team
Uber Cup
Silver medal – second place	2016 Kunshan	Women's team
Bronze medal – third place	2018 Bangkok	Women's team
Asian Championships
Bronze medal – third place	2017 Wuhan	Women's singles
Asia Team Championships
Bronze medal – third place	2018 Alor Setar	Women's team
Bronze medal – third place	2016 Hyderabad	Women's team
Summer Universiade
Silver medal – second place	2017 Taipei	Women's singles
World Junior Championships
Bronze medal – third place	2012 Chiba	Mixed team
Asian Junior Championships
Bronze medal – third place	2012 Gimcheon	Mixed team

- Lee Jang-mi
- Hangul: 이장미
- Hanja: 李張美
- RR: I Jangmi
- MR: I Changmi

Lee Jang-mi (Korean: 이장미; born 25 August 1994) is a South Korean female badminton player. She won her first international title at the 2015 Chinese Taipei Masters Grand Prix in the women's singles event.

== Achievements ==
=== Asian Championships ===
Women's singles
Year	Venue	Opponent	Score	Result
2017	Wuhan Sports Center Gymnasium; Wuhan, China	(Chinese Taipei) Tai Tzu-ying	8–21, 16–21	Bronze

=== Summer Universiade ===
Women's singles
Year	Venue	Opponent	Score	Result
2017	Taipei Gymnasium; Taipei, Taiwan	(Chinese Taipei) Tai Tzu-ying	9–21, 13–21	Silver

=== BWF Grand Prix ===
The BWF Grand Prix had two level such as Grand Prix and Grand Prix Gold. It was a series of badminton tournaments, sanctioned by Badminton World Federation (BWF) from 2007 to 2017.

Women's singles
Year	Tournament	Opponent	Score	Result
2017	Korea Masters	(China) Gao Fangjie	19–21, 5–21	(silver) Runner-up
2016	Korea Masters	(South Korea) Sung Ji-hyun	8–21, 10–21	(silver) Runner-up
2015	Chinese Taipei Masters	(South Korea) Kim Hyo-min	21–16, 21–16	(gold) Winner

BWF Grand Prix Gold tournament
BWF Grand Prix tournament

=== BWF International Challenge/Series ===
Women's singles
Year	Tournament	Opponent	Score	Result
2017	Osaka International	(Japan) Sayaka Takahashi	16–21, 18–21	(silver) Runner-up

BWF International Challenge tournament
BWF International Series tournament
