= Chang Ko-chi =

Taiwanese badminton player (born 1995)

Chang Ko-chi 張課琦
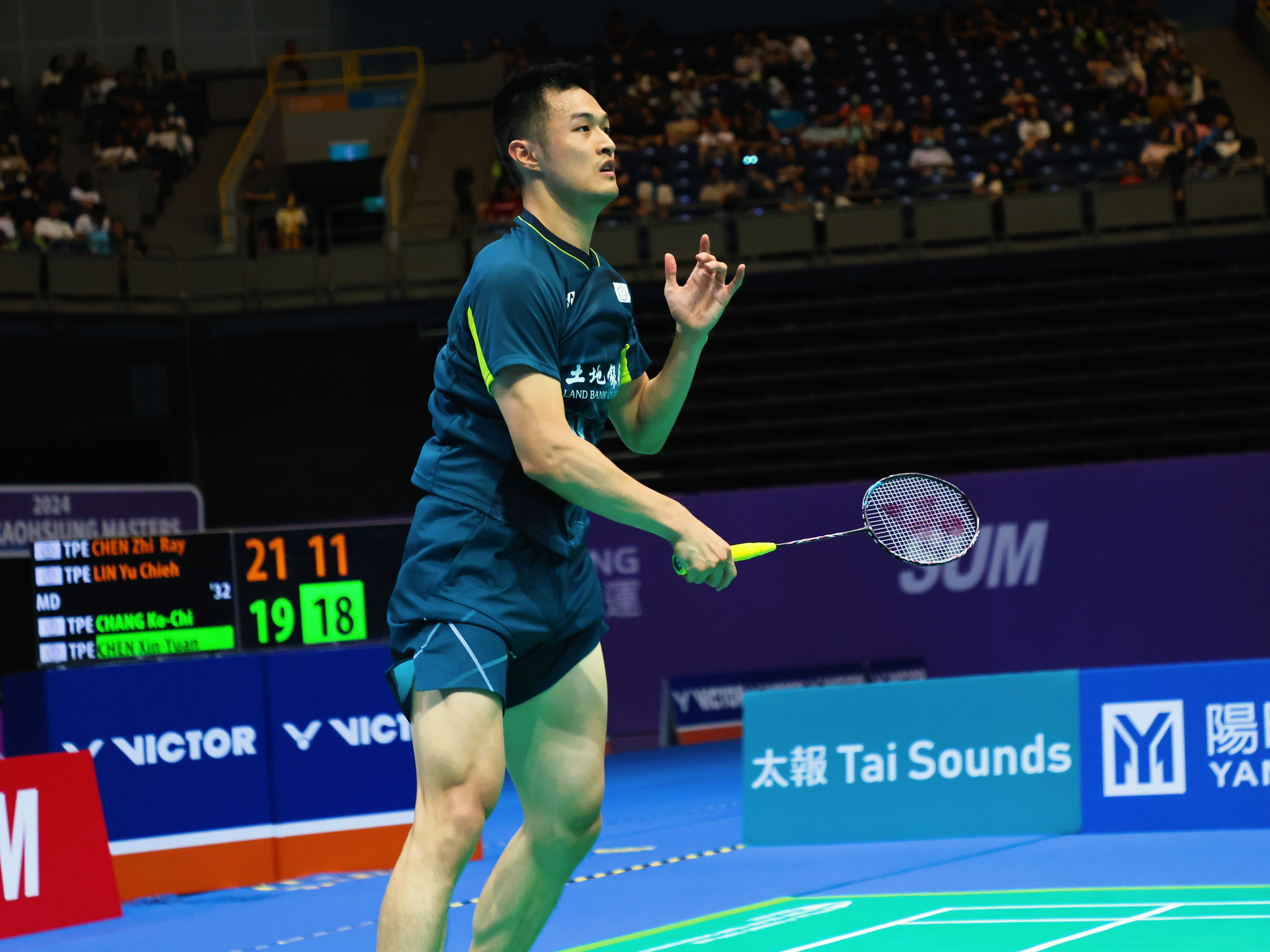
- Chang at the 2024 Kaohsiung Masters

Personal information
- Born: 21 November 1995 (age 30) Taiwan
- Height: 1.91 m (6 ft 3 in)

Sport
- Country: Republic of China (Taiwan)
- Sport: Badminton
- Handedness: Right

Men's & mixed doubles
- Highest ranking: 27 (MD with Po Li-wei, 29 August 2023); 26 (XD with Lee Chih-chen, 6 June 2023); 28 (XD with Chang Hsin-tien, 20 April 2017)
- Current ranking: 77 (MD with Po Li-wei, 30 June 2026)
- BWF profile

Chang Ko-chi (Chinese: 張課琦; pinyin: Zhāng Kèqí; born 21 November 1995) is a Taiwanese badminton player.

== Achievements ==
=== BWF World Tour (3 titles, 1 runner-up) ===
The BWF World Tour, which was announced on 19 March 2017 and implemented in 2018, is a series of elite badminton tournaments sanctioned by the Badminton World Federation (BWF). The BWF World Tours are divided into levels of World Tour Finals, Super 1000, Super 750, Super 500, Super 300 (part of the HSBC World Tour), and the BWF Tour Super 100.

Men's doubles
Year	Tournament	Level	Partner	Opponent	Score	Result
2018	Indonesia Masters	Super 100	(Chinese Taipei) Lu Chia-pin	(South Korea) Ko Sung-hyun (South Korea) Shin Baek-cheol	23–21, 21–13	(gold) Winner
2024	Kaohsiung Masters	Super 100	(Chinese Taipei) Chen Xin-yuan	(Chinese Taipei) Chen Zhi-ray (Chinese Taipei) Lin Yu-chieh	19–21, 21–16, 22–20	(gold) Winner
2025	Canada Open	Super 300	(Chinese Taipei) Po Li-wei	(Chinese Taipei) Lee Fang-chih (Chinese Taipei) Lee Fang-jen	19–21, 19–21	(silver) Runner-up
2026	Kaohsiung Masters	Super 100	(Chinese Taipei) Lu Chen	(Chinese Taipei) Cheng Kai-wen (Chinese Taipei) Liao Chao-pang	21–18, 18–21, 21–16	(gold) Winner

=== BWF Grand Prix (1 runner-up) ===
The BWF Grand Prix had two levels, the Grand Prix and Grand Prix Gold. It was a series of badminton tournaments sanctioned by the Badminton World Federation (BWF) and played between 2007 and 2017.

Mixed doubles
Year	Tournament	Partner	Opponent	Score	Result
2015	Chinese Taipei Masters	(Chinese Taipei) Chang Hsin-tien	(Indonesia) Ronald Alexander (Indonesia) Melati Daeva Oktavianti	18–21, 27–25, 15–21	(silver) Runner-up

BWF Grand Prix Gold tournament
BWF Grand Prix tournament

=== BWF International Challenge/Series (7 titles, 4 runners-up) ===
Men's doubles
Year	Tournament	Partner	Opponent	Score	Result
2019	Portugal International	(Chinese Taipei) Lee Fang-jen	(Scotland) Christopher Grimley (Scotland) Matthew Grimley	16–21, 21–16, 21–13	(gold) Winner
2022	Belgian International	(Chinese Taipei) Po Li-wei	(Thailand) Sirawit Sothon (Thailand) Natthapat Trinkajee	21–11, 19–21, 21–17	(gold) Winner
2022	Bendigo International	(Chinese Taipei) Po Li-wei	(Chinese Taipei) Lee Fang-chih (Chinese Taipei) Lee Fang-jen	21–15, 14–21, 22–20	(gold) Winner
2022	North Harbour International	(Chinese Taipei) Po Li-wei	(Chinese Taipei) Lee Fang-chih (Chinese Taipei) Lee Fang-jen	10–21, 22–20, 21–13	(gold) Winner
2023	Polish Open	(Chinese Taipei) Po Li-wei	(Denmark) Daniel Lundgaard (Denmark) Mads Vestergaard	20–22, 21–16, 19–21	(silver) Runner-up
2023	Saipan International	(Chinese Taipei) Po Li-wei	(Chinese Taipei) Lee Fang-chih (Chinese Taipei) Lee Fang-jen	29–30, 20–22	(silver) Runner-up

Mixed doubles
Year	Tournament	Partner	Opponent	Score	Result
2016	Italian International	(Chinese Taipei) Chang Hsin-tien	(France) Jordan Corvée (France) Anne Tran	13–21, 21–17, 17–21	(silver) Runner-up
2017	Orléans International	(Chinese Taipei) Chang Hsin-tien	(Germany) Mark Lamsfuß (Germany) Isabel Herttrich	9–21, 15–21	(silver) Runner-up
2019	Portugal International	(Chinese Taipei) Lee Chih-chen	(Bulgaria) Alex Vlaar (Bulgaria) Mariya Mitsova	21–12, 21–14	(gold) Winner
2022	Bendigo International	(Chinese Taipei) Lee Chih-chen	(Japan) Sumiya Nihei (Japan) Minami Asakura	16–21, 21–18, 21–17	(gold) Winner
2022	North Harbour International	(Chinese Taipei) Lee Chih-chen	(Japan) Sumiya Nihei (Japan) Minami Asakura	16–21, 21–9, 21–19	(gold) Winner

BWF International Challenge tournament
BWF International Series tournament
BWF Future Series tournament
