= Kim Hye-rin (badminton) =

South Korean badminton player (born 1995)

Personal information
- Born: 19 May 1995 (age 31) Changwon-si, South Gyeongsang Province, South Korea
- Height: 1.71 m (5 ft 7 in)

Sport
- Country: South Korea
- Sport: Badminton

Women's & mixed doubles
- Highest ranking: 9 (WD 10 March 2020); 105 (XD 13 July 2017)
- Current ranking: 12 (WD with Chang Ye-na), 213 (XD) (5 July 2022)
- BWF profile
Medal record
Women's badminton
Representing South Korea
Uber Cup
Bronze medal – third place	2018 Bangkok	Women's team
Asian Championships
Silver medal – second place	2017 Wuhan	Women's doubles
Asia Team Championships
Silver medal – second place	2020 Manila	Women's team
Bronze medal – third place	2018 Alor Setar	Women's team
World Junior Championships
Gold medal – first place	2013 Bangkok	Mixed team

Korean name
- Hangul: 김혜린
- RR: Gim Hyerin
- MR: Kim Hyerin

Kim Hye-rin (Korean: 김혜린; born 19 May 1995) is a South Korean badminton player. In 2013, she won the mixed doubles title at the Romanian International tournament partnered with Choi Sol-gyu. In 2017, she won the silver medal at the Asia Championships in the women's doubles event.

== Achievements ==
=== Asian Championships ===
Women's doubles
Year	Venue	Partner	Opponent	Score	Result
2017	Wuhan Sports Center Gymnasium; Wuhan, China	(South Korea) Yoo Hae-won	(Japan) Misaki Matsutomo (Japan) Ayaka Takahashi	19–21, 21–16, 10–21	Silver

=== BWF World Tour (1 title, 3 runners-up) ===
The BWF World Tour, which was announced on 19 March 2017 and implemented in 2018, is a series of elite badminton tournaments sanctioned by the Badminton World Federation (BWF). The BWF World Tour is divided into levels of World Tour Finals, Super 1000, Super 750, Super 500, Super 300 (part of the HSBC World Tour), and the BWF Tour Super 100.

Women's doubles
Year	Tournament	Level	Partner	Opponent	Score	Result
2019	Lingshui China Masters	Super 100	(South Korea) Baek Ha-na	(China) Liu Xuanxuan (China) Xia Yuting	21–14, 14–21, 21–15	(gold) Winner
2019	Canada Open	Super 100	(South Korea) Chang Ye-na	(Australia) Setyana Mapasa (Australia) Gronya Somerville	16–21, 14–21	(silver) Runner-up
2019	Hong Kong Open	Super 500	(South Korea) Chang Ye-na	(China) Chen Qingchen (China) Jia Yifan	11–21, 21–13, 15–21	(silver) Runner-up
2019	Syed Modi International	Super 300	(South Korea) Chang Ye-na	(South Korea) Baek Ha-na (South Korea) Jung Kyung-eun	21–23, 15–21	(silver) Runner-up

=== BWF Superseries (1 runner-up) ===
The BWF Superseries, which was launched on 14 December 2006 and implemented in 2007, was a series of elite badminton tournaments, sanctioned by the Badminton World Federation (BWF). BWF Superseries levels were Superseries and Superseries Premier. A season of Superseries consisted of twelve tournaments around the world that had been introduced since 2011. Successful players were invited to the Superseries Finals, which were held at the end of each year.

Women's doubles
Year	Tournament	Partner	Opponent	Score	Result
2017	China Open	(South Korea) Lee So-hee	(China) Chen Qingchen (China) Jia Yifan	7–21, 21–18, 14–21	(silver) Runner-up

BWF Super Series Premier tournament
BWF Super Series tournament

=== BWF Grand Prix (1 runner-up) ===
The BWF Grand Prix had two levels, the Grand Prix and Grand Prix Gold. It was a series of badminton tournaments sanctioned by the Badminton World Federation (BWF) and played between 2007 and 2017.

Women's doubles
Year	Tournament	Partner	Opponent	Score	Result
2017	Chinese Taipei Open	(South Korea) Yoo Hae-won	(South Korea) Chae Yoo-jung (South Korea) Kim So-yeong	12–21, 11–21	(silver) Runner-up

BWF Grand Prix Gold tournament
BWF Grand Prix tournament

=== BWF International Challenge/Series (2 titles, 2 runners-up) ===
Women's doubles
Year	Tournament	Partner	Opponent	Score	Result
2022	Mongolia International	(South Korea) Seong Ji-yeong	(South Korea) Seong Seung-yeon (South Korea) Yoon Min-ah	10–21, 17–21	(silver) Runner-up

Mixed doubles
Year	Tournament	Partner	Opponent	Score	Result
2013	Romanian International	(South Korea) Choi Sol-gyu	(Turkey) Ramazan Öztürk (Turkey) Neslihan Kılıç	21–16, 21–13	(gold) Winner
2022	Mongolia International	(South Korea) Ki Dong-ju	(South Korea) Choi Hyun-beom (South Korea) Yoon Min-ah	21–13, 13–21, 15–21	(silver) Runner-up
2026	Vietnam International (Bắc Ninh)	(South Korea) Lim Su-min	(Hong Kong) Ko Shing Hei (Hong Kong) Hung Ho Yan	21–17, 13–21, 21–11	(gold) Winner

BWF International Challenge tournament
BWF International Series tournament
