= 2015 Indonesian Masters Grand Prix Gold =

Tournament details
- Dates: 1 – 6 December 2015
- Edition: 6th
- Level: Grand Prix Gold
- Total prize money: US$120,000
- Venue: Graha Cakrawala Building, State University of Malang Complex
- Location: Malang, East Java, Indonesia

Champions
- Men's singles: (Indonesia) Tommy Sugiarto
- Women's singles: (China) He Bingjiao
- Men's doubles: (Indonesia) Berry Angriawan (Indonesia) Rian Agung Saputro
- Women's doubles: (China) Tang Yuanting (China) Yu Yang
- Mixed doubles: (Indonesia) Tantowi Ahmad (Indonesia) Liliyana Natsir

The 2015 Indonesian Masters Grand Prix Gold (officially known as the Yonex Sunrise Indonesian Masters 2015 for sponsorship reasons) was the twentieth grand prix's badminton tournament of the 2015 BWF Grand Prix and Grand Prix Gold. The tournament was held at the Graha Cakrawala Building, State University of Malang Complex in Malang, East Java, Indonesia December 1–6, 2015 and had a total purse of $120,000.

== Men's singles ==
=== Seeds ===
1. (India) Srikanth Kidambi (final)
2. (Indonesia) Tommy Sugiarto (champion)
3. (India) H. S. Prannoy (second round)
4. (Indonesia) Dionysius Hayom Rumbaka (withdrawn)
5. (Thailand) Tanongsak Saensomboonsuk (third round)
6. (South Korea) Jeon Hyeok-jin (first round)
7. (Indonesia) Ihsan Maulana Mustofa (third round)
8. (India) R. M. V. Gurusaidutt (third round)
9. (Indonesia) Jonatan Christie (quarterfinals)
10. (Singapore) Derek Wong Zi Liang (quarterfinals)
11. (Indonesia) Anthony Sinisuka Ginting (semifinals)
12. (Malaysia) Iskandar Zulkarnain Zainuddin (quarterfinals)
13. (Indonesia) Sony Dwi Kuncoro (third round)
14. (Indonesia) Firman Abdul Kholik (first round)
15. (Malaysia) Soo Teck Zhi (quarterfinals)
16. (Indonesia) Andre Kurniawan Tedjono (first round)

=== Finals ===
Quarterfinals
1	(India) Srikanth Kidambi	21	21
15	(Malaysia) Soo Teck Zhi	10	5
10	(Singapore) Derek Wong Zi Liang	14	14
11	(Indonesia) Anthony Sinisuka Ginting	21	21
12	(Malaysia) Iskandar Zulkarnain Zainuddin	13	18
(Indonesia) Wisnu Yuli Prasetyo	21	21
9	(Indonesia) Jonatan Christie	21	12	12
2	(Indonesia) Tommy Sugiarto	10	21	21

Semifinals
1	(India) Srikanth Kidambi	21	21
11	(Indonesia) Anthony Sinisuka Ginting	13	19
(Indonesia) Wisnu Yuli Prasetyo	18	18
2	(Indonesia) Tommy Sugiarto	21	21

Final
1	(India) Srikanth Kidambi	21	13	22
2	(Indonesia) Tommy Sugiarto	17	21	24

=== Top half ===
==== Section 1 ====
First Round
1	(India) K. Srikanth	21	21
(Indonesia) S P Wibowo	6	12
(Indonesia) V A Saputra	21	22
Q8	(Indonesia) C Sim	18	20
14	(Indonesia) F A Kholik	7	21
(China) Qiao B	21	23
(Indonesia) R Subagja	16	22	13
(Malaysia) Goh S H	21	20	21

Second Round
1	(India) K. Srikanth	21	17	25
(Indonesia) V A Saputra	14	21	23
(China) Qiao B	9	21	21
(Malaysia) Goh S H	21	14	11

Third Round
1	(India) K. Srikanth	21	21
(China) Qiao B	12	15

==== Section 2 ====
First Round
7	(Indonesia) I M Mustofa	21	21
(Indonesia) F I Hadmadi	17	9
(Indonesia) Y F Mainaky	6	6
(China) Ye BH	21	21
15	(Malaysia) Soo T Z	19	21	21
(Indonesia) A Saputra	21	17	12
(Indonesia) T A Mahbub	21	21
Q6	(Indonesia) I A Wirawan	11	16

Second Round
7	(Indonesia) I M Mustofa	21	21
(China) Ye BH	17	13
15	(Malaysia) Soo T Z	12	21	21
(Indonesia) T A Mahbub	21	12	17

Third Round
7	(Indonesia) I M Mustofa	21	16	17
15	(Malaysia) Soo T Z	19	21	21

==== Section 3 ====
First Round
PFQ	(Indonesia) E F Kusuma	6	12
(Indonesia) P A Sudrajat	21	21
(South Korea) Heo K-h	21	21
(Indonesia) M F Wikajaya	5	9
10	(Singapore) Derek Wong Z L	18	21	21
(Indonesia) K H Wirawan	21	16	16
(Indonesia) A G Dharma	21	21
Q2	(Indonesia) H Y Wijayanto	19	15

Second Round
(Indonesia) P A Sudrajat	21	21
(South Korea) Heo K-h	15	19
10	(Singapore) Derek Wong Z L	21	21
(Indonesia) A G Dharma	14	14

Third Round
(Indonesia) P A Sudrajat	19	18
10	(Singapore) Derek Wong Z L	21	21

==== Section 4 ====
First Round
5	(Thailand) T Saensomboonsuk	12	21	21
(Indonesia) M R Reyhaldi	21	9	11
Q7	(Indonesia) Y Sidik	21	21
(Indonesia) N E Sulistyo	19	15
11	(Indonesia) A S Ginting	21	21
(South Korea) Kim D-h	16	18
(Indonesia) A Susanto	23	21
Q4	(Indonesia) M Ciputra	25	23

Second Round
5	(Thailand) T Saensomboonsuk	21	21
Q7	(Indonesia) Y Sidik	15	13
11	(Indonesia) A S Ginting	21	21
Q4	(Indonesia) M Ciputra	11	14

Third Round
5	(Thailand) T Saensomboonsuk	15	12
11	(Indonesia) A S Ginting	21	21

=== Bottom half ===
==== Section 5 ====
First Round
Q5	(Indonesia) H Y Satria	20	25
(Indonesia) K B Alexander	22	27
(Indonesia) R Perdana	12	14
12	(Malaysia) I Z Zainuddin	21	21
(Singapore) Loh K Y	21	15	21
(Indonesia) S H Rhustavito	17	21	19
PFQ	(Indonesia) M A O Khairulloh	10	3
8	(India) R. M. V. Gurusaidutt	21	21

Second Round
(Indonesia) K B Alexander	6	10
12	(Malaysia) I Z Zainuddin	21	21
(Singapore) Loh K Y	19	21	15
8	(India) R. M. V. Gurusaidutt	21	19	21

Third Round
12	(Malaysia) I Z Zainuddin	21	17	21
8	(India) R. M. V. Gurusaidutt	14	21	15

==== Section 6 ====
First Round
(China) Huang YX	21	21
(Indonesia) R F Ivanudin	9	16
(Indonesia) W Y Prasetyo	21	21
16	(Indonesia) A K Tedjono	10	15
(China) Shi YQ	14	21	21
(Indonesia) E Sukamta	21	17	11
(Indonesia) P A Maulana	16	16
3	(India) H. S. Prannoy	21	21

Second Round
(China) Huang YX	20	20
(Indonesia) W Y Prasetyo	22	22
(China) Shi YQ	21	20	21
3	(India) H. S. Prannoy	12	22	13

Third Round
(Indonesia) W Y Prasetyo	22	21
(China) Shi YQ	20	12

==== Section 7 ====
First Round
(Indonesia) K A Nugraha	21	21
Q1	(Indonesia) K Akbar	9	6
(Indonesia) R A Megananda	16	16
9	(Indonesia) J Christie	21	21
(Indonesia) V Anindita	16	11
(South Korea) Seo S-j	21	21
(Indonesia) M B Pangisthu	21	21
6	(South Korea) Jeon H-j	16	16

Second Round
(Indonesia) K A Nugraha	16	19
9	(Indonesia) J Christie	21	21
(South Korea) Seo S-j	19	21	13
(Indonesia) M B Pangisthu	21	17	21

Third Round
9	(Indonesia) J Christie	21	17	21
(Indonesia) M B Pangisthu	16	21	11

==== Section 8 ====
First Round
Q3	(Indonesia) N Muhammad	17	12
(Indonesia) V V Nirwanda	21	21
(Indonesia) A Yunus	6	16
13	(Indonesia) S D Kuncoro	21	21
(China) Lin GP	21	21
(Indonesia) E Shafira	18	16
(Indonesia) R Patriawan	5	5
2	(Indonesia) T Sugiarto	21	21

Second Round
(Indonesia) V V Nirwanda	19	6
13	(Indonesia) S D Kuncoro	21	21
(China) Lin GP	19	24	12
2	(Indonesia) T Sugiarto	21	22	21

Third Round
13	(Indonesia) S D Kuncoro	11	8
2	(Indonesia) T Sugiarto	21	21

== Women's singles ==
=== Seeds ===
1. (India) Pusarla Venkata Sindhu (quarterfinals)
2. (Indonesia) Maria Febe Kusumastuti (quarterfinals)
3. (South Korea) Kim Hyo-min (semifinals)
4. (Indonesia) Lindaweni Fanetri (quarterfinals)
5. (Malaysia) Tee Jing Yi (second round)
6. (Singapore) Chen Jiayuan (withdrawn)
7. (South Korea) Lee Jang-mi (second round)
8. (Singapore) Liang Xiaoyu (quarterfinals)

=== Finals ===
Semifinals
(China) He Bingjiao	21	21
(Indonesia) Hera Desi	9	10
3	(South Korea) Kim Hyo-min	21	17	8
(China) Chen Yufei	19	21	21

Final
(China) He Bingjiao	21	21
(China) Chen Yufei	18	9

=== Top half ===
==== Section 1 ====
First Round
1	(India) P. V. Sindhu	21	19	21
(Indonesia) G M Tunjung	16	21	12
(Indonesia) G M Moningka	21	18	19
Q1	(Indonesia) W C U Sukoputri	13	21	21
7	(South Korea) Lee J-m	14	21	21
(Indonesia) Y Y Susanto	21	14	17
(Indonesia) R Hartawan	21	12	17
(China) He BJ	14	21	21

Second Round
1	(India) P. V. Sindhu	21	21
Q1	(Indonesia) W C U Sukoputri	12	9
7	(South Korea) Lee J-m	19	15
(China) He BJ	21	21

Quarterfinals
1	(India) P. V. Sindhu	21	13
(China) He BJ	23	21

==== Section 2 ====
First Round
4	(Indonesia) L Fanetri	21	21
(Malaysia) Lim Y F	15	18
(Indonesia) Fitriani	20	14
(China) Chen XX	22	21
PFQ	(Indonesia) G N Rahmadani	19	21	14
(Indonesia) L A Mainaky	21	16	21
(Indonesia) H Desi	21	21
Q4	(Indonesia) S Fatmawati	11	14

Second Round
4	(Indonesia) L Fanetri	20	21	21
(China) Chen XX	22	12	10
(Indonesia) L A Mainaky	11	16
(Indonesia) H Desi	21	21

Quarterfinals
4	(Indonesia) L Fanetri	21	22	15
(Indonesia) H Desi	19	24	21

=== Bottom half ===
==== Section 3 ====
First Round
(Indonesia) F Angguni	21	21
Q2	(Indonesia) M D Surya Saraswati	11	14
(Indonesia) D D Ayustine	12	15
8	(Singapore) Liang XY	21	21
(Indonesia) A Rovita	21	21
Q3	(Indonesia) V Florencya	9	10
(Indonesia) A O Winata	13	19
3	(South Korea) Kim H-m	21	21

Second Round
(Indonesia) F Angguni	14	18
8	(Singapore) Liang XY	21	21
(Indonesia) A Rovita	5	15
3	(South Korea) Kim H-m	21	21

Quarterfinals
8	(Singapore) Liang XY	15	4
3	(South Korea) Kim H-m	21	21

==== Section 4 ====
First Round
(China) Chen YF	21	9
(Indonesia) A Firdasari	12	4^{r}
(Indonesia) J F Sugiarto	16	16
5	(Malaysia) Tee J Y	21	21
(Indonesia) H Ramadini	21	21	21
PFQ	(Indonesia) P Siahaya	23	14	11
(Indonesia) I D Jayanti	10	16
2	(Indonesia) M F Kusumastuti	21	21

Second Round
(China) Chen YF	21	12	21
5	(Malaysia) Tee J Y	13	21	14
(Indonesia) H Ramadini	16	18
2	(Indonesia) M F Kusumastuti	21	21

Quarterfinals
(China) Chen YF	23	21
2	(Indonesia) M F Kusumastuti	21	11

== Men's doubles ==
=== Seeds ===
1. (Indonesia) Mohammad Ahsan / Hendra Setiawan (quarterfinals)
2. (China) Chai Biao / Hong Wei (final)
3. (China) Liu Xiaolong / Qiu Zihan (withdrawn)
4. (Indonesia) Angga Pratama / Ricky Karanda Suwardi (quarterfinals)
5. (Russia) Vladimir Ivanov / Ivan Sozonov (first round)
6. (China) Li Junhui / Liu Yuchen (semifinals)
7. (Indonesia) Wahyu Nayaka / Ade Yusuf (quarterfinals)
8. (Indonesia) Markus Fernaldi Gideon / Kevin Sanjaya Sukamuljo (quarterfinals)

=== Finals ===
Semifinals
(Indonesia) Hendra Aprida Gunawan (Indonesia) Markis Kido	23	17	15
(Indonesia) Berry Angriawan (Indonesia) Rian Agung Saputro	21	21	21
6	(China) Li Junhui (China) Liu Yuchen	17	11
2	(China) Chai Biao (China) Hong Wei	21	21

Final
(Indonesia) Berry Angriawan (Indonesia) Rian Agung Saputro	21	22
2	(China) Chai Biao (China) Hong Wei	11	20

=== Top half ===
==== Section 1 ====
First Round
1	(Indonesia) M Ahsan (Indonesia) H Setiwan	21	21
PFQ	(Indonesia) K B Alexander (Indonesia) N E Sulistyo	11	12
PFQ	(Indonesia) R Syaoqi (Indonesia) T Supriadi	14	14
(Indonesia) Hardianto (Indonesia) K A Haryanto	21	21
5	(Russia) V Ivanov (Russia) I Sozonov	20	15
(Indonesia) H A Gunawan (Indonesia) M Kido	22	21
(Indonesia) F Alfian (Indonesia) M R Ardianto	21	22
(Philippines) P G Magnaye (Philippines) P J Vivas	16	20

Second Round
1	(Indonesia) M Ahsan (Indonesia) H Setiwan	21	21
(Indonesia) Hardianto (Indonesia) K A Haryanto	15	15
(Indonesia) H A Gunawan (Indonesia) M Kido	17	21	21
(Indonesia) F Alfian (Indonesia) M R Ardianto	21	16	17

Quarterfinals
1	(Indonesia) M Ahsan (Indonesia) H Setiwan	17	23	8
(Indonesia) H A Gunawan (Indonesia) M Kido	21	21	21

==== Section 2 ====
First Round
PFQ	(Indonesia) A M Adiartama (Indonesia) H Setiawan	21	17	21
(Indonesia) M Fachrikar (Indonesia) M R Pahlevi Isfahani	12	21	19
(Indonesia) B Angriawan (Indonesia) R A Saputro	21	22	21
(Malaysia) Ong Y S (Malaysia) Teo E Y	13	24	9
7	(Indonesia) W Nayaka (Indonesia) A Yusuf	21	18	21
(Chinese Taipei) Lee J-h (Chinese Taipei) Le Y	11	21	14
(Indonesia) H Y Satria (Indonesia) A Susanto	12	12
Q1	(Indonesia) A Barriq (Indonesia) R Dhanriano	21	21

Second Round
PFQ	(Indonesia) A M Adiartama (Indonesia) H Setiawan	15	14
(Indonesia) B Angriawan (Indonesia) R A Saputro	21	21
7	(Indonesia) W Nayaka (Indonesia) A Yusuf	21	21
Q1	(Indonesia) A Barriq (Indonesia) R Dhanriano	18	17

Quarterfinals
(Indonesia) B Angriawan (Indonesia) R A Saputro	21	23
7	(Indonesia) W Nayaka (Indonesia) A Yusuf	18	21

=== Bottom half ===
==== Section 3 ====
First Round
(Indonesia) C H Kudamassa (Indonesia) A P Rahmanto Putra	21	21
Q2	(Indonesia) I A Wirawan (Indonesia) E F Kusuma	18	14
(Indonesia) V Anindita (Indonesia) S P Wibowo	9	10
6	(China) Li JH (China) Liu YC	21	21
Q3	(Malaysia) Low J S (Malaysia) Tan K M	21	21
(Indonesia) Y R Sugiarto (Indonesia) A Y Wirawan	11	19
(Indonesia) Hantoro (Indonesia) R Swastedian	16	15
4	(Indonesia) A Pratama (Indonesia) R K Suwardi	21	21

Second Round
(Indonesia) C H Kudamassa (Indonesia) A P Rahmanto Putra	13	14
6	(China) Li JH (China) Liu YC	21	21
Q3	(Malaysia) Low J S (Malaysia) Tan K M	21	17	14
4	(Indonesia) A Pratama (Indonesia) R K Suwardi	17	21	21

Quarterfinals
6	(China) Li JH (China) Liu YC	21	17	21
4	(Indonesia) A Pratama (Indonesia) R K Suwardi	12	21	14

==== Section 4 ====
First Round
(Indonesia) F Kurniawan (Indonesia) F Kurniawan	21	21
Q4	(Indonesia) A Ramadiansyah (Indonesia) R Rivaldy	18	11
(Philippines) P J Escueta (Philippines) R Estanislao	12	12
8	(Indonesia) M F Gideon (Indonesia) K S Sukamuljo	21	21
(Indonesia) D Juang (Indonesia) C Rusdianto	w	/	o
(Malaysia) Chooi K M (Malaysia) Ow Y H
(Indonesia) R Wijaya (Indonesia) M Ulinnuha	10	8
2	(China) Chai B (China) Hong W	21	21

Second Round
(Indonesia) F Kurniawan (Indonesia) F Kurniawan	16	14
8	(Indonesia) M F Gideon (Indonesia) K S Sukamuljo	21	21
(Indonesia) D Juang (Indonesia) C Rusdianto	13	10
2	(China) Chai B (China) Hong W	21	21

Quarterfinals
8	(Indonesia) M F Gideon (Indonesia) K S Sukamuljo	16	21	19
2	(China) Chai B (China) Hong W	21	13	21

== Women's doubles ==
=== Seeds ===
1. (Indonesia) Nitya Krishinda Maheswari / Greysia Polii (final)
2. (Malaysia) Vivian Hoo Kah Mun / Woon Khe Wei (quarterfinals)
3. (Malaysia) Amelia Alicia Anscelly / Soong Fie Cho (second round)
4. (Indonesia) Keshya Nurvita Hanadia / Devi Tika Permatasari (second round)

=== Finals ===
Semifinals
1	(Indonesia) Nitya Krishinda Maheswari (Indonesia) Greysia Polii	21	21
(Indonesia) Suci Rizky Andini (Indonesia) Maretha Dea Giovani	14	15
(Indonesia) Komala Dewi (Indonesia) Vita Marissa	10	8
(China) Tang Yuanting (China) Yu Yang	21	21

Final
1	(Indonesia) Nitya Krishinda Maheswari (Indonesia) Greysia Polii	17	11
(China) Tang Yuanting (China) Yu Yang	21	21

=== Top half ===
==== Section 1 ====
First Round
1	(Indonesia) N K Maheswari (Indonesia) G Polii
BYE
(Indonesia) R Asela (Indonesia) M I Tutiharta	6	6
(Indonesia) G R Imawan (Indonesia) T R Nuraidah	21	21
(Indonesia) D A Surya (Indonesia) F E Kusumawati
BYE
(Indonesia) A S Awanda (Indonesia) N K Mahadewi Istirani	w	/	o
(China) Huang DP (China) Ou DN

Second Round
1	(Indonesia) N K Maheswari (Indonesia) G Polii	21	21
(Indonesia) G R Imawan (Indonesia) T R Nuraidah	13	11
(Indonesia) D A Surya (Indonesia) F E Kusumawati	15	9
(Indonesia) A S Awanda (Indonesia) N K Mahadewi Istirani	21	21

Quarterfinals
1	(Indonesia) N K Maheswari (Indonesia) G Polii	21	21
(Indonesia) A S Awanda (Indonesia) N K Mahadewi Istirani	15	16

==== Section 2 ====
First Round
3	(Malaysia) A A Anscelly (Malaysia) Soong F C
BYE
(Indonesia) S R Andini (Indonesia) M D Giovani	21	21
(Indonesia) M Lukmanda (Indonesia) B F Romadhini	10	16
(Indonesia) P Z Bernadeth (Indonesia) V A P Lejarsari
BYE
(Indonesia) N P Lestari (Indonesia) M C Sahputri	21	20	14
(South Korea) Kim H-r (South Korea) Kong H-y	18	22	21

Second Round
3	(Malaysia) A A Anscelly (Malaysia) Soong F C	15	11
(Indonesia) S R Andini (Indonesia) M D Giovani	21	21
(Indonesia) P Z Bernadeth (Indonesia) V A P Lejarsari	22	14	21
(South Korea) Kim H-r (South Korea) Kong H-y	20	21	19

Quarterfinals
(Indonesia) S R Andini (Indonesia) M D Giovani	21	21
(Indonesia) P Z Bernadeth (Indonesia) V A P Lejarsari	17	19

=== Bottom half ===
==== Section 3 ====
First Round
(Malaysia) Chow M K (Malaysia) Lai P J	18	26	23
(Indonesia) R P Dili (Indonesia) R A Pradipta	21	24	21
BYE
(Indonesia) A Rahayu (Indonesia) J F Sugiarto
(Indonesia) R Amelia (Indonesia) R A Nugraheny	11	15
(Indonesia) K Dewi (Indonesia) V Marissa	21	21
BYE
4	(Indonesia) K N Hanadia (Indonesia) D T Permatasari

Second Round
(Malaysia) Chow M K (Malaysia) Lai P J	21	21
(Indonesia) A Rahayu (Indonesia) J F Sugiarto	15	19
(Indonesia) K Dewi (Indonesia) V Marissa	w	/	o
4	(Indonesia) K N Hanadia (Indonesia) D T Permatasari

Quarterfinals
(Malaysia) Chow M K (Malaysia) Lai P J	14	13
(Indonesia) K Dewi (Indonesia) V Marissa	21	21

==== Section 4 ====
First Round
(China) Tang YT (China) Yu Y	21	22
(Indonesia) Y Barkah (Indonesia) D Saraswati	4	20
BYE
(Indonesia) D Fitriani (Indonesia) N Melati
(Indonesia) D D Haris (Indonesia) R E Putri Sari	21	20	21
(Indonesia) M Oklamona (Indonesia) R Rositawati	13	22	15
BYE
2	(Malaysia) Vivian Hoo K M (Malaysia) Woon K W

Second Round
(China) Tang YT (China) Yu Y	21	21
(Indonesia) D Fitriani (Indonesia) N Melati	17	10
(Indonesia) D D Haris (Indonesia) R E Putri Sari	21	14	16
2	(Malaysia) Vivian Hoo K M (Malaysia) Woon K W	19	21	21

Quarterfinals
(China) Tang YT (China) Yu Y	18	21	21
2	(Malaysia) Vivian Hoo K M (Malaysia) Woon K W	21	13	13

== Mixed doubles ==
=== Seeds ===
1. (Indonesia) Tantowi Ahmad / Lilyana Natsir (champion)
2. (China) Lu Kai / Huang Yaqiong (quarterfinals)
3. (Indonesia) Praveen Jordan / Debby Susanto (final)
4. (Indonesia) Edi Subaktiar / Gloria Emanuelle Widjaja (first round)

=== Finals ===
Semifinals
1	(Indonesia) Tontowi Ahmad (Indonesia) Liliyana Natsir	21	21
(China) Li Junhui (China) Huang Dongping	10	10
3	(Indonesia) Praveen Jordan (Indonesia) Debby Susanto	21	21
(Indonesia) Hafiz Faisal (Indonesia) Shella Devi Aulia	14	16

Final
1	(Indonesia) Tontowi Ahmad (Indonesia) Liliyana Natsir	21	21
3	(Indonesia) Praveen Jordan (Indonesia) Debby Susanto	18	13

=== Top half ===
==== Section 1 ====
First Round
1	(Indonesia) T Ahmad (Indonesia) L Natsir
BYE
(Indonesia) R Alexander (Indonesia) M D Oktaviani	13	21	21
(Indonesia) P A Sudrajat (Indonesia) A Rahayu	21	12	8
(Indonesia) L A Nugroho (Indonesia) Z Ulfa	w	/	o
(Indonesia) T Wardhana (Indonesia) V A P Lejarsari
(Indonesia) R A Nugroho (Indonesia) V Marissa	21	16	21
(Malaysia) Tan K M (Malaysia) Lai P J	18	21	19

Second Round
1	(Indonesia) T Ahmad (Indonesia) L Natsir	21	21
(Indonesia) R Alexander (Indonesia) M D Oktaviani	16	16
(Indonesia) L A Nugroho (Indonesia) Z Ulfa	16	15
(Indonesia) R A Nugroho (Indonesia) V Marissa	21	21

Quarterfinals
1	(Indonesia) T Ahmad (Indonesia) L Natsir	21	21
(Indonesia) R A Nugroho (Indonesia) V Marissa	12	8

==== Section 2 ====
First Round
4	(Indonesia) E Subaktiar (Indonesia) G E Widjaja	13	21	19
(Indonesia) A E Prasetya (Indonesia) M Mahmudin	21	15	21
(China) Liu YC (China) Ou DN
(Indonesia) H J Putra Wibowo (Indonesia) R Asela	w	/	o
(Indonesia) D Juang (Indonesia) K N Hanadia	21	21
(Indonesia) Y R Sugiarto (Indonesia) D Fitriani	18	14
(Indonesia) R Widianto (Indonesia) A Saufika	19	13
(China) Li JH (China) Huang DP	21	21

Second Round
(Indonesia) A E Prasetya (Indonesia) M Mahmudin	21	21
(Indonesia) H J Putra Wibowo (Indonesia) R Asela	7	12
(Indonesia) D Juang (Indonesia) K N Hanadia	12	12
(China) Li JH (China) Huang DP	21	21

Quarterfinals
(Indonesia) A E Prasetya (Indonesia) M Mahmudin	17	21	19
(China) Li JH (China) Huang DP	21	14	21

=== Bottom half ===
==== Section 3 ====
First Round
(South Korea) Kim J-h (South Korea) Kim H-r	21	21
(Indonesia) H Tandjaya (Indonesia) M I Tutiharta	5	5
(Indonesia) F Kurniawan (Indonesia) K Dewi	21	21
(Indonesia) B Drajat (Indonesia) Y Barkah	14	14
(Indonesia) A Y Wirawan (Indonesia) N Melati	10	21	11
(Indonesia) I Fadhilah (Indonesia) W Anggraini	21	17	21
(Indonesia) T Supriadi (Indonesia) R Amelia	13	18
3	(Indonesia) P Jordan (Indonesia) D Susanto	21	21

Second Round
(South Korea) Kim J-h (South Korea) Kim H-r	11	8
(Indonesia) F Kurniawan (Indonesia) K Dewi	21	21
(Indonesia) I Fadhilah (Indonesia) W Anggraini	18	16
3	(Indonesia) P Jordan (Indonesia) D Susanto	21	21

Quarterfinals
(Indonesia) F Kurniawan (Indonesia) K Dewi	24	16	15
3	(Indonesia) P Jordan (Indonesia) D Susanto	22	21	21

==== Section 4 ====
First Round
(Malaysia) Wong F Y (Malaysia) Chow M K	21	21
(Indonesia) A B Cahyono (Indonesia) R A Nugraheny	18	18
(Indonesia) J Wiratama (Indonesia) D A Surya	6	15
(Indonesia) H Faisal (Indonesia) S D Aulia	21	21
(Indonesia) M Kido (Indonesia) P Z Bernadeth	21	21
(Indonesia) Y F Mainaky (Indonesia) L A Mainaky	17	18
(Indonesia) A M Adiartama (Indonesia) F E Kusumawati	12	9
2	(China) Lu K (China) Huang YQ	21	21

Second Round
(Malaysia) Wong F Y (Malaysia) Chow M K	19	11
(Indonesia) H Faisal (Indonesia) S D Aulia	21	21
(Indonesia) M Kido (Indonesia) P Z Bernadeth	13	12
2	(China) Lu K (China) Huang YQ	21	21

Quarterfinals
(Indonesia) H Faisal (Indonesia) S D Aulia	21	15	21
2	(China) Lu K (China) Huang YQ	11	21	16

Preceded by 2015 Macau Open Grand Prix Gold; 2015 Brasil Open Grand Prix	BWF Grand Prix and Grand Prix Gold; 2015 BWF Season	Succeeded by 2015 U.S. Open Grand Prix
