= Suci Rizky Andini =

Indonesian badminton player (born 1993)

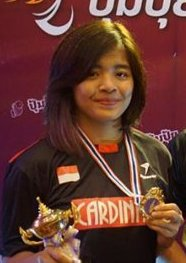

Personal information
- Born: 26 March 1993 (age 33) Bandung, West Java, Indonesia
- Height: 1.65 m (5 ft 5 in)
- Weight: 58 kg (128 lb)

Sport
- Country: Indonesia
- Sport: Badminton
- Handedness: Right

Women's doubles
- Highest ranking: 19 (with Della Destiara Haris 8 July 2013)
- BWF profile
Medal record
Women's badminton
Representing Indonesia
Southeast Asian Games
Bronze medal – third place	2015 Singapore	Women's doubles
Bronze medal – third place	2015 Singapore	Women's team
World Junior Championships
Silver medal – second place	2009 Alor Setar	Girls' doubles
Bronze medal – third place	2011 Taipei	Girls' doubles
Asian Junior Championships
Gold medal – first place	2011 Lucknow	Girls' doubles
Bronze medal – third place	2010 Kuala Lumpur	Mixed team
Bronze medal – third place	2011 Lucknow	Mixed team

Suci Rizky Andini (born 26 March 1993) is an Indonesian badminton player specializing in doubles, from the Mutiara Cardinal Bandung club. She won the girls' doubles title at the 2011 Asian Junior Championships partnered with Tiara Rosalia Nuraidah. Andini competed at the 2011 and 2014 World Championships, and also at the 2014 Asian Games.

== Achievements ==
=== Southeast Asian Games ===
Women's doubles
Year	Venue	Partner	Opponent	Score	Result
2015	Singapore Indoor Stadium, Singapore	(Indonesia) Maretha Dea Giovani	(Malaysia) Amelia Alicia Anscelly (Malaysia) Soong Fie Cho	16–21, 21–23	Bronze

=== BWF World Junior Championships ===
Girls' doubles
Year	Venue	Partner	Opponent	Score	Result
2009	Sultan Abdul Halim Stadium; Alor Setar, Malaysia	(Indonesia) Tiara Rosalia Nuraidah	(China) Tang Jinhua (China) Xia Huan	9–21, 18–21	Silver
2011	Taoyuan Arena; Taoyuan City, Taipei, Taiwan	(Indonesia) Tiara Rosalia Nuraidah	(South Korea) Lee So-hee (South Korea) Shin Seung-chan	23–21, 20–22, 5–21	Bronze

=== Asian Junior Championships ===
Girls' doubles
Year	Venue	Partner	Opponent	Score	Result
2011	Babu Banarasi Das Indoor Stadium; Lucknow, India	(Indonesia) Tiara Rosalia Nuraidah	(Malaysia) Chow Mei Kuan (Malaysia) Lee Meng Yean	21–18, 16–21, 21–12	Gold

=== BWF Grand Prix (2 runners-up) ===
The BWF Grand Prix had two levels, the Grand Prix and Grand Prix Gold. It was a series of badminton tournaments sanctioned by the Badminton World Federation (BWF) and played between 2007 and 2017.

Women's doubles
Year	Tournament	Partner	Opponent	Score	Result
2012	Chinese Taipei Open	(Indonesia) Della Destiara Haris	(Indonesia) Pia Zebadiah Bernadet (Indonesia) Rizki Amelia Pradipta	15–21, 12–21	(silver) Runner-up
2015	Vietnam Open	(Indonesia) Maretha Dea Giovani	(Thailand) Jongkolphan Kititharakul (Thailand) Rawinda Prajongjai	14–21, 12–21	(silver) Runner-up

BWF Grand Prix Gold tournament
BWF Grand Prix tournament

=== BWF International Challenge/Series (7 titles, 1 runner-up) ===
Women's doubles
Year	Tournament	Partner	Opponent	Score	Result
2010	Indonesia International	(Indonesia) Della Destiara Haris	(Indonesia) Komala Dewi (Indonesia) Keshya Nurvita Hanadia	21–18, 12–21, 21–10	(gold) Winner
2011	Indonesia International	(Indonesia) Della Destiara Haris	(Indonesia) Devi Tika Permatasari (Indonesia) Keshya Nurvita Hanadia	21–16, 21–16	(gold) Winner
2011	India International	(Indonesia) Della Destiara Haris	(Indonesia) Gebby Ristiyani Imawan (Indonesia) Tiara Rosalia Nuraidah	23–21, 21–13	(gold) Winner
2014	Indonesia International	(Indonesia) Tiara Rosalia Nuraidah	(Indonesia) Shendy Puspa Irawati (Indonesia) Vita Marissa	11–6, 11–9, 11–6	(gold) Winner
2015	Austrian Open	(Indonesia) Maretha Dea Giovani	(England) Heather Olver (England) Lauren Smith	21–14, 23–21	(gold) Winner
2015	Indonesia International	(Indonesia) Maretha Dea Giovani	(Indonesia) Gebby Ristiyani Imawan (Indonesia) Tiara Rosalia Nuraidah	17–21, 14–21	(silver) Runner-up
2016	Smiling Fish International	(Indonesia) Yulfira Barkah	(Indonesia) Rahmadhani Hastiyanti Putri (Indonesia) Rika Rositawati	21–18, 21–18	(gold) Winner
2016	Singapore International	(Indonesia) Yulfira Barkah	(Indonesia) Mychelle Crhystine Bandaso (Indonesia) Serena Kani	21–14, 21–12	(gold) Winner

BWF International Challenge tournament
BWF International Series tournament

=== Invitational tournament ===
Women's doubles
Year	Tournament	Partner	Opponent	Score	Result
2014	Copenhagen Masters	(Indonesia) Tiara Rosalia Nuraidah	(Denmark) Christinna Pedersen (Denmark) Kamilla Rytter Juhl	18–21, 16–21	(silver) Runner-up

== Performance timeline ==
Key

W	Won	F	Finalist	SF	Semi-finalist
QF	Quarter-finalist	#R	Rounds 4, 3, 2, 1	RR	Round-robin stage
Q#	Qualification round	A	Absent	w/d	Withdrew
G	Gold	S	Silver	B	Bronze
NH	Not held	N/A	Not applicable	DNQ	Did not qualify

=== National team ===
- Junior level

Team event	2010	2011
Asian Junior Championships	B	B

- Senior level

Team event	2015
Southeast Asian Games	B

=== Individual competitions ===
- Junior level

Events	2009	2011
Asian Junior Championships		G
World Junior Championships	S	B

- Senior level

Event	2015
Southeast Asian Games	B

Event	2011	2013	2014
World Championships	2R	A	2R

Tournament	2010	2011	2012	2013	2014	2015	Best
BWF Superseries
All England Open	A			1R	2R	1R	2R (2014)
India Open	N/A	A		2R	1R	A	QF (2010)
Malaysia Open	A	2R	A	2R	2R	A	2R (2011, 2013, 2014)
Singapore Open	A			1R	QF	1R	QF (2014)
Australian Open	N/A				A	2R	2R (2012, 2015)
China Masters	A				N/A		2R (2015)
Indonesia Open	QF	Q2	1R	1R	1R	1R	QF (2010)
Korea Open	A	1R	A	1R	2R	A	2R (2014)
Denmark Open	A		2R	A			2R (2012)
French Open	A		2R	A			2R (2012)
China Open	A		1R	A			1R (2012)
Hong Kong Open	A		2R	A	1R	1R	2R (2012)

Tournament	2010	2011	2012	2013	2014	2015	2016	Best
BWF Grand Prix and Grand Prix Gold
Australian Open	A		2R	A	N/A			2R (2012)
Bitburger Open	QF	A						QF (2010)
China Masters	N/A				A	2R	A	2R (2015)
Chinese Taipei Masters	NH					2R	A	2R (2015)
Chinese Taipei Open	A	QF	F	A	1R	A		F (2012)
Dutch Open	A			1R	A			1R (2013)
German Open	A					1R	A	1R (2015)
India Open	QF	N/A						QF (2010)
Indonesia Masters	QF	1R	QF	2R	A	SF	QF	SF (2015)
Korea Masters	N/A	2R	A		1R	2R	A	2R (2011, 2015)
London Open	NH			QF	NH			QF (2013)
Macau Open	A				QF	2R	A	QF (2014)
Malaysia Masters	1R	1R	2R	A				2R (2012)
Swiss Open	N/A	A		1R	1R	A		1R (2013, 2014)
Syed Modi International	SF	QF	A					SF (2010)
Thailand Masters	NH						2R	2R (2016)
Thailand Open	NH	2R	QF	QF	NH	A		QF (2012, 2013)
Vietnam Open	1R	A	2R	A		F	A	F (2015)
