= Ni Ketut Mahadewi Istarani =

Indonesian badminton player (born 1994)

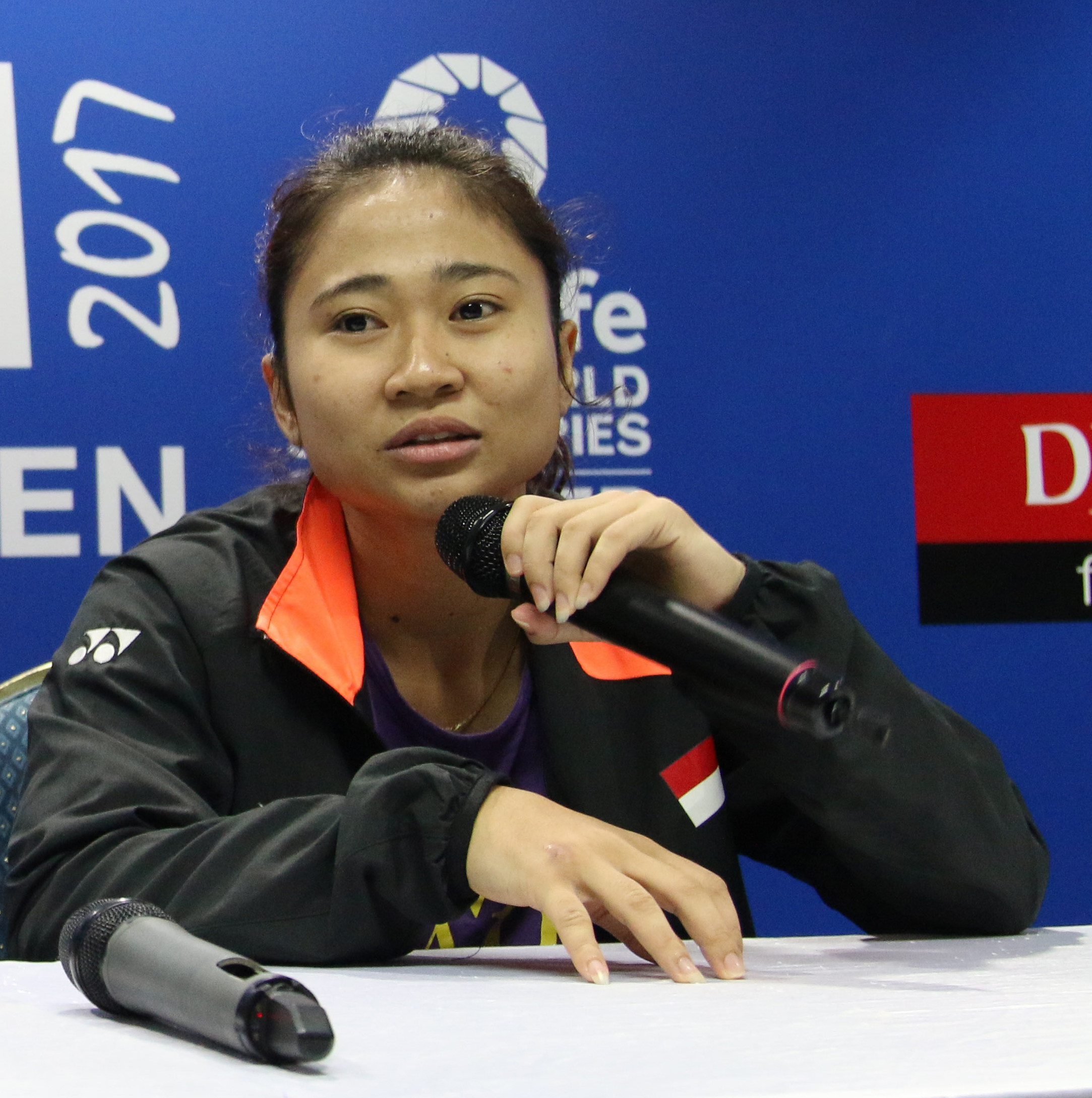

Personal information
- Born: 12 September 1994 (age 32) Tabanan, Bali, Indonesia
- Height: 1.62 m (5 ft 4 in)

Sport
- Country: Indonesia
- Sport: Badminton
- Handedness: Right
- Retired: 11 June 2022

Women's & mixed doubles
- Highest ranking: 13 (WD with Anggia Shitta Awanda 25 January 2018); 162 (XD with Yodhi Satrio 3 October 2013)
- BWF profile
Medal record
Women's badminton
Representing Indonesia
Sudirman Cup
Bronze medal – third place	2019 Nanning	Mixed team
Asian Games
Bronze medal – third place	2018 Jakarta–Palembang	Women's team
Asia Mixed Team Championships
Bronze medal – third place	2019 Hong Kong	Mixed team
Asia Team Championships
Bronze medal – third place	2018 Alor Setar	Women's team
SEA Games
Silver medal – second place	2019 Philippines	Women's team
Bronze medal – third place	2015 Singapore	Women's doubles
Bronze medal – third place	2015 Singapore	Women's team
Bronze medal – third place	2017 Kuala Lumpur	Women's team

Ni Ketut Mahadewi Istarani (born 12 September 1994) is an Indonesian badminton player specializing in doubles, from PB. Jaya Raya Suryanaga Surabaya she later affiliated with Djarum club. She was the women's doubles bronze medalist at the 2015 SEA Games with her partner Anggia Shitta Awanda. She announced her retirement from the international badminton tournament on 11 June 2022.

== Personal life ==
She is of Balinese origin. Her name is from the Balinese naming system. Ni refers to "female" and Ketut means she is the fourth child of the family. Her given name is Mahadewi Istirani. She was born in Bengkel Kawan village, Kediri, Tabanan Regency.

== Awards and nominations ==
Award	Year	Category	Result	Ref.
Indonesian Sport Awards	2018	Favorite Women's Team Athlete with 2018 Asian Games women's badminton team	Won	

== Achievements ==
=== SEA Games ===
Women's doubles
Year	Venue	Partner	Opponent	Score	Result
2015	Singapore Indoor Stadium, Singapore	(Indonesia) Anggia Shitta Awanda	(Malaysia) Vivian Hoo (Malaysia) Woon Khe Wei	12–21, 11–21	Bronze

=== BWF World Tour (1 title, 2 runners-up) ===
The BWF World Tour, which was announced on 19 March 2017 and implemented in 2018, is a series of elite badminton tournaments sanctioned by the Badminton World Federation (BWF). The BWF World Tour is divided into levels of World Tour Finals, Super 1000, Super 750, Super 500, Super 300 (part of the HSBC World Tour), and the BWF Tour Super 100.

Women's doubles
Year	Tournament	Level	Partner	Opponent	Score	Result
2018	Thailand Masters	Super 300	(Indonesia) Anggia Shitta Awanda	(Thailand) Jongkolphan Kititharakul (Thailand) Rawinda Prajongjai	19–21, 17–21	(silver) Runner-up
2018	SaarLorLux Open	Super 100	(Indonesia) Rizki Amelia Pradipta	(Bulgaria) Gabriela Stoeva (Bulgaria) Stefani Stoeva	20–22, 21–15, 19–21	(silver) Runner-up
2019	Russian Open	Super 100	(Indonesia) Tania Oktaviani Kusumah	(Japan) Miki Kashihara (Japan) Miyuki Kato	23–21, 21–16	(gold) Winner

=== BWF Grand Prix (1 title, 3 runners-up) ===
The BWF Grand Prix had two levels, the Grand Prix and Grand Prix Gold. It was a series of badminton tournaments sanctioned by the Badminton World Federation (BWF) and played between 2007 and 2017.

Women's doubles
Year	Tournament	Partner	Opponent	Score	Result
2014	Vietnam Open	(Indonesia) Gebby Ristiyani Imawan	(Indonesia) Maretha Dea Giovani (Indonesia) Rosyita Eka Putri Sari	19–21, 21–15, 10–21	(silver) Runner-up
2015	Chinese Taipei Masters	(Indonesia) Anggia Shitta Awanda	(Japan) Shiho Tanaka (Japan) Koharu Yonemoto	21–19, 21–14	(gold) Winner
2016	Macau Open	(Indonesia) Anggia Shitta Awanda	(China) Chen Qingchen (China) Jia Yifan	15–21, 13–21	(silver) Runner-up
2017	Dutch Open	(Indonesia) Anggia Shitta Awanda	(Indonesia) Della Destiara Haris (Indonesia) Rizki Amelia Pradipta	17–21, 16–21	(silver) Runner-up

BWF Grand Prix Gold tournament
BWF Grand Prix tournament

=== BWF International Challenge/Series (2 titles, 2 runners-up) ===
Women's doubles
Year	Tournament	Partner	Opponent	Score	Result
2015	Vietnam International	(Indonesia) Anggia Shitta Awanda	(Thailand) Chayanit Chaladchalam (Thailand) Phataimas Muenwong	21–10, 21–18	(gold) Winner
2015	Indonesia International	(Indonesia) Anggia Shitta Awanda	(Indonesia) Gebby Ristiyani Imawan (Indonesia) Tiara Rosalia Nuraidah	13–21, 11–21	(silver) Runner-up
2021	Austrian Open	(Indonesia) Serena Kani	(Malaysia) Anna Cheong (Malaysia) Yap Cheng Wen	21–11, 21–16	(gold) Winner

Mixed doubles
Year	Tournament	Partner	Opponent	Score	Result
2013	Indonesia International	(Indonesia) Yodhi Satrio	(Indonesia) Ardiansyah Putra (Indonesia) Devi Tika Permatasari	21–19, 18–21, 19–21	(silver) Runner-up

BWF International Challenge tournament
BWF International Series tournament

=== Invitational tournament (1 runner-up) ===
Women's doubles
Year	Tournament	Partner	Opponent	Score	Result
2015	Copenhagen Masters	(Indonesia) Anggia Shitta Awanda	(Denmark) Christinna Pedersen (Denmark) Kamilla Rytter Juhl	10–21, 8–21	(silver) Runner-up

== Performance timeline ==
Key

W	Won	F	Finalist	SF	Semi-finalist
QF	Quarter-finalist	#R	Rounds 4, 3, 2, 1	RR	Round-robin stage
Q#	Qualification round	A	Absent	w/d	Withdrew
G	Gold	S	Silver	B	Bronze
NH	Not held	N/A	Not applicable	DNQ	Did not qualify

=== National team ===
- Junior level

Team event	2012
World Junior Championships	4th

- Senior level

Team events	2015	2016	2017	2018	2019	2020
SEA Games	B	NH	B	NH	S	NH
Asia Team Championships	NH	QF	NH	B	NH	QF
Asia Mixed Team Championships	NH		QF	NH	B	NH
Asian Games	NH			B	NH	
Uber Cup	NH	QF	NH	QF	NH	
Sudirman Cup	A	NH	A	NH	B	NH

=== Individual competitions ===
==== Junior level ====
In the junior level tournament, Istarani best achievement was a mixed doubles quarter-finalist at the 2012 World Junior Championships.

Girls' doubles

Events	2012
Asian Junior Championships	2R
World Junior Championships	3R

Mixed doubles

Events	2012
Asian Junior Championships	3R
World Junior Championships	QF

==== Senior level ====
In the senior level tournament, Istarani won bronze medal in the 2015 SEA Games, and also won 2 individual titles in the BWF tour equivalent events.

===== Women's doubles =====
Events	2015	2016	2017	2018
SEA Games	B	NH	A	NH
Asian Championships	A	2R	A	
World Championships	DNQ	NH	DNQ	QF

Tournament	BWF Superseries / Grand Prix					BWF World Tour				Best
Tournament	2013	2014	2015	2016	2017	2018	2019	2020	2021	Best
Thailand Masters	NH			A	QF	F	1R	Q1	NH	F ('18)
Swiss Open	A				1R	A		NH	A	1R ('17)
German Open	A					2R	2R	NH		2R ('18, '19)
All England Open	A			2R	1R	2R	QF	A		QF ('19)
Lingshui China Masters	N/A					2R	A	NH		2R ('18)
Malaysia Masters	A		1R	1R	A	2R	QF	A	NH	QF ('19)
New Zealand Open	A	w/d	w/d	A	1R	2R	A	NH		2R ('18)
Australian Open	A		1R	A				NH		1R ('15)
India Open	A		1R	2R	A		1R	NH		2R ('16)
Malaysia Open	A		2R	2R	2R	A	QF	NH		QF ('19)
Singapore Open	A				2R	A	1R	NH		2R ('17)
Korea Masters	A		QF	A	QF	2R	A	NH		QF ('15, '17)
Thailand Open	A	NH	A			QF	A		NH	QF ('18)
Russian Open	A						W	NH		W ('19)
Akita Masters	NH					A	1R	NH		1R ('19)
Hyderabad Open	NH					A	1R	NH		1R ('19)
Korea Open	A					QF	A	NH		QF ('18)
Chinese Taipei Open	A	1R	A	w/d	A		1R	NH		1R ('14, '19)
Vietnam Open	A	F	A				QF	NH		F ('14)
China Open	A			2R	A	1R	A	NH		2R ('16)
Japan Open	A					1R	A	NH		1R ('18)
Indonesia Masters Super 100	NH					A	w/d	NH		N/A
Syed Modi International	NH	A		2R	A	2R	A	NH		2R ('16, '18)
Dutch Open	A	2R	A		F	A		NH	N/A	F ('17)
Denmark Open	A			2R	1R	QF	A			QF ('18)
French Open	A			1R	A	2R	A	NH	A	2R ('18)
SaarLorLux Open	A					F	A			F ('18)
Macau Open	A	2R	2R	F	QF	A		NH		F ('16)
Hong Kong Open	A		1R	2R	A		2R	NH		2R ('16, '19)
Indonesia Masters	Q2	2R	QF	w/d	NH	1R	1R	2R	A	QF ('15)
Indonesia Open	A	Q2	1R	QF	SF	2R	A	NH	A	SF ('17)
Chinese Taipei Masters	NH		W	A	NH					W ('15)
Year-end ranking	550	110	33	16	20	19	34	59	76	13
Tournament	2013	2014	2015	2016	2017	2018	2019	2020	2021	Best

===== Mixed doubles =====
Tournament	BWF Superseries / Grand Prix					BWF World Tour				Best
Tournament	2013	2014	2015	2016	2017	2018	2019	2020	2021	Best
Malaysia Masters	A			Q2	A				NH	Q2 ('16)
Spain Masters	NH					A			QF	QF ('21)
Indonesia Masters	2R	1R	A		NH	A				2R ('13)
Year-end ranking	180	189		980					341	162
Tournament	2013	2014	2015	2016	2017	2018	2019	2020	2021	Best

== Record against selected opponents ==
Women's doubles results with Anggia Shitta Awanda against World Superseries finalists, World Championships semifinalists, and Olympic quarterfinalists:

- (Denmark) Christinna Pedersen & Kamilla Rytter Juhl 1–0
- (Indonesia) Nitya Krishinda Maheswari & Greysia Polii 0–1
- (South Korea) Lee So-hee & Shin Seung-chan 0–1
- (Malaysia) Vivian Hoo & Woon Khe Wei 0–2
