= Anggia Shitta Awanda =

Indonesian badminton player (born 1994)

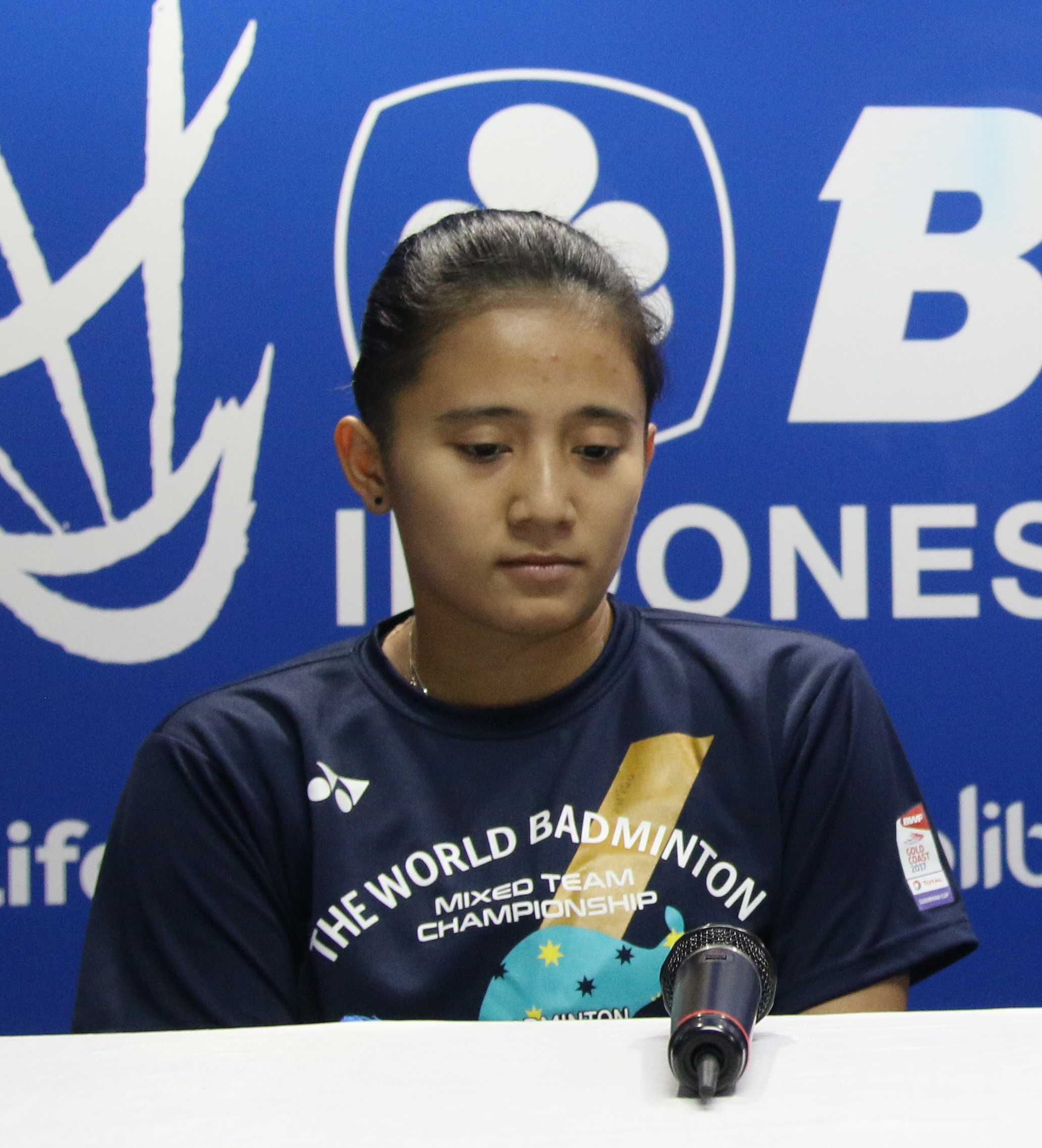

Personal information
- Born: 22 May 1994 (age 32) Bekasi, West Java, Indonesia
- Height: 1.70 m (5 ft 7 in)
- Weight: 64 kg (141 lb)

Sport
- Country: Indonesia
- Sport: Badminton
- Handedness: Right

Women's doubles
- Highest ranking: 13 (with Ni Ketut Mahadewi Istarani 25 January 2018)
- BWF profile
Medal record
Women's badminton
Representing Indonesia
Sudirman Cup
Bronze medal – third place	2015 Dongguan	Mixed team
Asia Team Championships
Bronze medal – third place	2018 Alor Setar	Women's team
Southeast Asian Games
Bronze medal – third place	2015 Singapore	Women's doubles
Bronze medal – third place	2015 Singapore	Women's team
World Junior Championships
Silver medal – second place	2011 Taipei	Girls' doubles

Anggia Shitta Awanda (born 22 May 1994) is an Indonesian badminton player specializing in doubles, affiliated with Jaya Raya Jakarta badminton club. She was the 2011 World Junior girls' doubles silver medallist partnered with Shella Devi Aulia.

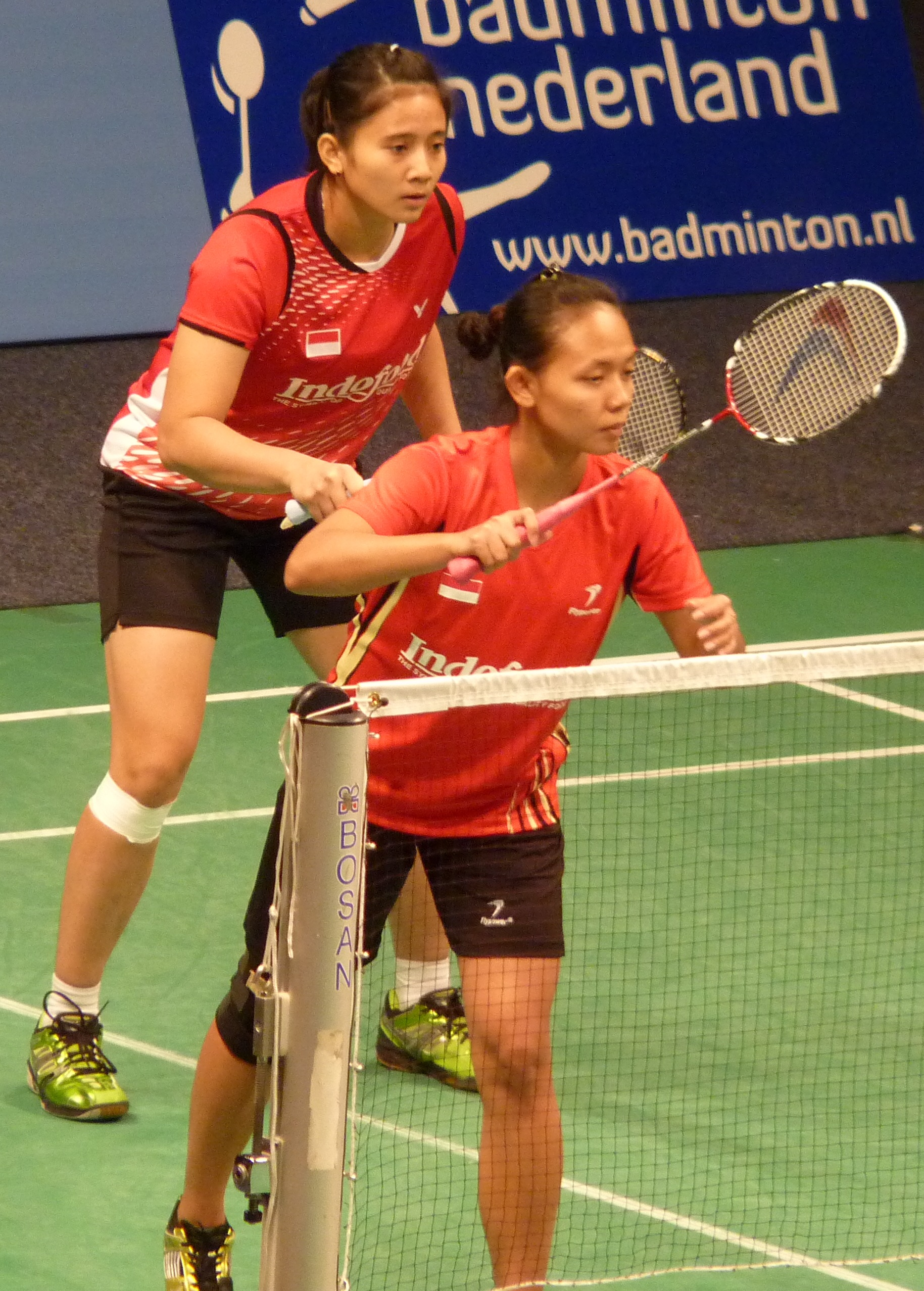
Anggia Shitta Awanda in action with Della Destiara Haris

== Achievements ==
=== Southeast Asian Games ===
Women's doubles
Year	Venue	Partner	Opponent	Score	Result
2015	Singapore Indoor Stadium, Singapore	(Indonesia) Ni Ketut Mahadewi Istarani	(Malaysia) Vivian Hoo (Malaysia) Woon Khe Wei	12–21, 11–21	Bronze

=== BWF World Junior Championships ===
Girls' doubles
Year	Venue	Partner	Opponent	Score	Result
2011	Taoyuan Arena; Taoyuan, Taiwan	(Indonesia) Shella Devi Aulia	(South Korea) Lee So-hee (South Korea) Shin Seung-chan	16–21, 21–13, 9–21	Silver

=== BWF World Tour (1 runner-up) ===
The BWF World Tour, which was announced on 19 March 2017 and implemented in 2018, is a series of elite badminton tournaments sanctioned by the Badminton World Federation (BWF). The BWF World Tour is divided into levels of World Tour Finals, Super 1000, Super 750, Super 500, Super 300 (part of the HSBC World Tour), and the BWF Tour Super 100.

Women's doubles
Year	Tournament	Level	Partner	Opponent	Score	Result
2018	Thailand Masters	Super 300	(Indonesia) Ni Ketut Mahadewi Istarani	(Thailand) Jongkolphan Kititharakul (Thailand) Rawinda Prajongjai	19–21, 17–21	(silver) Runner-up

=== BWF Grand Prix (1 title, 3 runners-up) ===
The BWF Grand Prix had two levels, the Grand Prix and Grand Prix Gold. It was a series of badminton tournaments sanctioned by the Badminton World Federation (BWF) and played between 2007 and 2017.

Women's doubles
Year	Tournament	Partner	Opponent	Score	Result
2013	Dutch Open	(Indonesia) Della Destiara Haris	(China) Bao Yixin (China) Tang Jinhua	15–21, 7–21	(silver) Runner-up
2015	Chinese Taipei Masters	(Indonesia) Ni Ketut Mahadewi Istarani	(Japan) Shiho Tanaka (Japan) Koharu Yonemoto	21–19, 21–14	(gold) Winner
2016	Macau Open	(Indonesia) Ni Ketut Mahadewi Istarani	(China) Chen Qingchen (China) Jia Yifan	15–21, 13–21	(silver) Runner-up
2017	Dutch Open	(Indonesia) Ni Ketut Mahadewi Istarani	(Indonesia) Della Destiara Haris (Indonesia) Rizki Amelia Pradipta	17–21, 16–21	(silver) Runner-up

BWF Grand Prix Gold tournament
BWF Grand Prix tournament

=== BWF International Challenge/Series (3 titles, 2 runners-up) ===
Women's doubles
Year	Tournament	Partner	Opponent	Score	Result
2013	Indonesia International	(Indonesia) Shella Devi Aulia	(Indonesia) Maretha Dea Giovani (Indonesia) Melvira Oklamona	12–21, 18–21	(silver) Runner-up
2015	Vietnam International	(Indonesia) Ni Ketut Mahadewi Istarani	(Thailand) Chayanit Chaladchalam (Thailand) Phataimas Muenwong	21–10, 21–18	(gold) Winner
2015	Indonesia International	(Indonesia) Ni Ketut Mahadewi Istarani	(Indonesia) Gebby Ristiyani Imawan (Indonesia) Tiara Rosalia Nuraidah	13–21, 11–21	(silver) Runner-up
2019	Indonesia International	(Indonesia) Pia Zebadiah Bernadet	(Japan) Natsu Saito (Japan) Naru Shinoya	21–19, 21–18	(gold) Winner
2022 (I)	Indonesia International	(Indonesia) Putri Larasati	(Chinese Taipei) Sung Yu-hsuan (Chinese Taipei) Wang Szu-min	21–19, 22–20	(gold) Winner

BWF International Challenge tournament
BWF International Series tournament

=== Invitational Tournament ===
Women's doubles
Year	Tournament	Partner	Opponent	Score	Result
2015	Copenhagen Masters	(Indonesia) Ni Ketut Mahadewi Istarani	(Denmark) Christinna Pedersen (Denmark) Kamilla Rytter Juhl	10–21, 8–21	(silver) Runner-up

== Performance timeline ==
Key

W	Won	F	Finalist	SF	Semi-finalist
QF	Quarter-finalist	#R	Rounds 4, 3, 2, 1	RR	Round-robin stage
Q#	Qualification round	A	Absent	w/d	Withdrew
G	Gold	S	Silver	B	Bronze
NH	Not held	N/A	Not applicable	DNQ	Did not qualify

=== National team ===
- Junior level

Team events	2011	2012
Asian Junior Championships	A	QF
World Junior Championships	QF	4th

- Senior level

Team events	2015	2016	2017	2018
Southeast Asian Games	B	NH	A	NH
Asia Women's Team Championships	NH	QF	NH	B
Asia Mixed Team Championships	NH		QF	NH
Asian Games	NH			A
Uber Cup	NH	QF	NH	A
Sudirman Cup	B	NH	RR	NH

=== Individual competitions ===
==== Junior level ====
Girls' doubles

Events	2011	2012
Asian Junior Championships	A	QF
World Junior Championships	S	2R

==== Senior level ====
===== Women's singles =====
Tournament	BWF Superseries / Grand Prix	Best
Tournament	2011	Best
Indonesia Masters	Q1	Q1 ('11)

===== Women's doubles =====
Events	2014	2015	2016	2017	2018
Southeast Asian Games	NH	B	NH	A	NH
Asian Championships	A		2R	A	
World Championships	QF	DNQ	NH	DNQ	QF

Tournament	BWF Super Series / Grand Prix							BWF World Tour					Best
Tournament	2011	2012	2013	2014	2015	2016	2017	2018	2019	2020	2021	2022	Best
India Open	A			2R	1R	2R	A		1R	NH		A	2R ('14, '16)
Syed Modi International	A	2R	NH	A		2R	A			NH		A	2R ('12, '16)
German Open	A		1R	A				2R	A	NH		A	2R ('18)
All England Open	A		2R	2R	A	2R	2R	2R	A				2R ('13, '14, '16, '17, '18)
Swiss Open	A			1R	A		2R	A		NH	A		2R ('17)
Korea Open	A			1R	A			QF	A	NH		A	QF ('18)
Korea Masters	A	QF	A		QF	A	QF	A		NH		A	QF ('12, '15, '17)
Indonesia Masters	2R	QF	QF	1R	QF	w/d	NH	1R	A	Q1	A	1R	QF ('12, '13, '15)
Indonesia Open	A	1R	1R	1R	1R	QF	SF	2R	A	NH	A		SF ('17)
Malaysia Open	A			2R	2R	2R	2R	A	1R	NH		A	2R ('14, '15, '16, '17)
Malaysia Masters	A				1R	1R	A	2R	A		NH	A	2R ('18)
Singapore Open	A			1R	A		2R	A	1R	NH		A	2R ('17)
Chinese Taipei Open	A			2R	A	w/d	A		1R	NH		A	2R ('14)
Japan Open	A							1R	A	NH		A	1R ('18)
Indonesia Masters Super 100	NH							A	2R	NH		A	2R ('19)
Denmark Open	A					2R	1R	A					2R ('16)
French Open	A					1R	A			NH	A		1R ('16)
SaarLorLux Open	A							w/d	A				
Macau Open	A			2R	2R	F	QF	A		NH			F ('16)
Hong Kong Open	A		QF	A	1R	2R	A			NH			QF ('13)
Australian Open	A		2R	A	1R	A		2R	A	NH		A	2R ('13, '18)
New Zealand Open	NA	NH	QF	A	w/d	A		2R	A	NH			QF ('13)
China Open	A					2R	A	1R	A	NH			2R ('16)
China Masters	A						w/d	A		NH			
Chinese Taipei Masters	NA				W	A	NA						W ('15)
Dutch Open	A		F	QF	A		F	A		NH	NA		F ('13, '17)
Lingshui China Masters	NA							QF	A	NH			QF ('18)
London Grand Prix Gold	NA		2R	NA									2R ('13)
Thailand Masters	NH					A	QF	F	A	1R	NH		F ('18)
Vietnam Open	1R	A	1R	A			SF	A	SF	NA			SF ('17, '19)
Year-end Ranking	96	58	76	27	33	16	20	19	68	61	77	132	13
Tournament	2011	2012	2013	2014	2015	2016	2017	2018	2019	2020	2021	2022	Best

===== Mixed doubles =====
Tournament	BWF World Tour	Best
Tournament	2019	Best
Indonesia Masters Super 100	1R	1R ('19)
Vietnam Open	1R	1R ('19)
Year-end Ranking	267	253

== Record against selected opponents ==
Women's doubles results with Ni Ketut Mahadewi Istarani against World Superseries finalists, World Championships semifinalists, and Olympic quarterfinalists:

- (Denmark) Christinna Pedersen & Kamilla Rytter Juhl 1–0
- (Indonesia) Nitya Krishinda Maheswari & Greysia Polii 0–1
- (South Korea) Lee So-hee & Shin Seung-chan 0–1
- (Malaysia) Vivian Hoo & Woon Khe Wei 0–2
