= 2012 BWF World Junior Championships – Mixed doubles =

The Mixed doubles tournament of the 2012 BWF World Junior Championships was held from October 30 until November 3. Alfian Eko Prasetya and Gloria Emanuelle Widjaja were the defending champion.

Edi Subaktiar and Melati Daeva Oktavianti won the title after defeating the defending champion Alfian Eko Prasetya and his new partner Shella Devi Aulia 21–17, 21–13 in the final. It was the second straight years for Indonesia to make all-Indonesian final in the mixed doubles.

== Seeded ==
1. (South Korea) Choi Sol-gyu / Chae Yoo-jung (quarter-final)
2. (Indonesia) Edi Subaktiar / Melati Daeva Oktavianti (champion)
3. (China) Liu Yuchen / Chen Qingchen (semi-final)
4. (China) Wang Yilu / Huang Yaqiong (semi-final)
5. (South Korea) Kim Jung-ho / Kim Ji-won (fourth round)
6. (Denmark) Kasper Antonsen / Line Kjaersfeldt (fourth round)
7. (South Korea) Jung Jae-wook / Shin Seung-chan (quarter-final)
8. (Malaysia) Tan Wee Gieen / Chow Mei Kuan (fourth round)
9. (Germany) Mark Lamsfuß / Franziska Volkmann (second round)
10. (Netherlands) Robin Tabeling / Myke Halkema (fourth round)
11. (England) Tom Wolfenden / Holly Smith (second round)
12. (Indonesia) Alfian Eko Prasetya / Shella Devi Aulia (final)
13. (Indonesia) Putra Eka Rhoma / Ni Ketut Mahadewi Istirani (quarter-final)
14. (Hong Kong) Lee Chun Hei / Yuen Sin Ying (quarter-final)
15. (Russia) Alexandr Zinchenko / Olga Morozova (fourth round)
16. (Czech Republic) Jaromir Janacek / Lucie Cerna (third round)

== Draw ==
=== Finals ===
Quarterfinals
1	(South Korea) Choi Sol-gyu (South Korea) Chae Yoo-jung	17	13
9/16	(Indonesia) Alfian Eko Prasetya (Indonesia) Shella Devi Aulia	21	21
3/4	(China) Wang Yilu (China) Huang Yaqiong	21	21
9/16	(Hong Kong) Lee Chun Hei (Hong Kong) Yuen Sin Ying	14	15
9/16	(Indonesia) Putra Eka Rhoma (Indonesia) Ni Ketut Mahadewi Istirani	21	14
3/4	(China) Liu Yuchen (China) Chen Qingchen	23	21
5/8	(South Korea) Jung Jae-wook (South Korea) Shin Seung-chan	14	19
2	(Indonesia) Edi Subaktiar (Indonesia) Melati Daeva Oktavianti	21	21

Semifinals
9/16	(Indonesia) Alfian Eko Prasetya (Indonesia) Shella Devi Aulia	12	21	21
3/4	(China) Wang Yilu (China) Huang Yaqiong	21	19	12
3/4	(China) Liu Yuchen (China) Chen Qingchen	21	18	11
2	(Indonesia) Edi Subaktiar (Indonesia) Melati Daeva Oktavianti	14	21	21

Final
9/16	(Indonesia) Alfian Eko Prasetya (Indonesia) Shella Devi Aulia	17	13
2	(Indonesia) Edi Subaktiar (Indonesia) Melati Daeva Oktavianti	21	21

=== Top Half ===
==== Section 1 ====
First round
(Singapore) R Ng (Singapore) Yeo JM	21	21
(Sri Lanka) B Goonathileka (Sri Lanka) S Illangakoon	16	9
(Canada) A D'Souza (Canada) C Tsai	19	21	21
(Philippines) G Sibayan (Philippines) K Salatan	21	17	18
(Australia) C Chen (Australia) V Kessler	23	21
(South Africa) A Malan (South Africa) L de Wet	21	17

Second round
1	(South Korea) Choi S-g (South Korea) Chae Y-j	21	26
(Malaysia) D Devadass (Malaysia) Yap CW	9	24
(Japan) K Matsui (Japan) S Hayata	21	21
(Singapore) R Ng (Singapore) Yeo JM	14	16
9/16	(Germany) M Lamsfuss (Germany) F Volkmann	21	21	17
(Finland) J Korhonen (Finland) J Nyström	14	23	21
(Canada) A D'Souza (Canada) C Tsai	21	21
(Australia) C Chen (Australia) V Kessler	13	13

Third round
1	(South Korea) Choi S-g (South Korea) Chae Y-j	21	21
(Japan) K Matsui (Japan) S Hayata	12	13
(Finland) J Korhonen (Finland) J Nyström	21	23
(Canada) A D'Souza (Canada) C Tsai	16	21

Fourth round
1	(South Korea) Choi S-g (South Korea) Chae Y-j	21	21
(Finland) J Korhonen (Finland) J Nyström	15	15

==== Section 2 ====
First round
(Belgium) S van den Broeck (Belgium) F Vandenhoucke	21	21
(Uzbekistan) A Savatyugin (Uzbekistan) M Pakina	14	10
(Czech Republic) M Svetnicka (Czech Republic) M Svetnickova	13	15
(Chinese Taipei) Hsueh A-t (Chinese Taipei) Shih Y-c	21	21
(Vietnam) Pham HN (Vietnam) Pham NT	12	12
(China) Pei TY (China) Huang DP	21	21

Second round
5/8	(Denmark) K Antonsen (Denmark) L Kjaersfeldt	21	21
(Bulgaria) S Garev (Bulgaria) G Stoeva	17	9
(United States) P Chew (United States) I Wang	21	21
(Belgium) S van den Broeck (Belgium) F Vandenhoucke	19	8
9/16	(Indonesia) A Prasetya (Indonesia) S Aulia	21	21
(Thailand) P Bowornwatanuwong (Thailand) L Narissapat	17	14
(Chinese Taipei) Hsueh A-t (Chinese Taipei) Shih Y-c	10	8
(China) Pei TY (China) Huang DP	21	21

Third round
5/8	(Denmark) K Antonsen (Denmark) L Kjaersfeldt	22	21
(United States) P Chew (United States) I Wang	20	7
9/16	(Indonesia) A Prasetya (Indonesia) S Aulia	21	11	22
(China) Pei TY (China) Huang DP	18	21	20

Fourth round
5/8	(Denmark) K Antonsen (Denmark) L Kjaersfeldt	12	18
9/16	(Indonesia) A Prasetya (Indonesia) S Aulia	21	21

==== Section 3 ====
First round
(Netherlands) R Muns (Netherlands) M Sibbald	21	21
(Uzbekistan) B Appakhodjaev (Uzbekistan) V Mushtakova	9	8
(Germany) M Byerly (Germany) L Kaepplein	21	13	20
(Canada) D Yao (Canada) T Wang	16	21	22
(Indonesia) K Sukamuljo (Indonesia) M Giovani	21	21
(Sri Lanka) V Kukulage (Sri Lanka) Y Dayarathne	10	13

Second round
3/4	(China) Wang YL (China) Huang YQ	21	21
(Republic of Ireland) J Magee (Republic of Ireland) R Darragh	3	11
(Philippines) T Co (Philippines) A Leonardo	16	15
(Netherlands) R Muns (Netherlands) M Sibbald	21	21
9/16	(England) T Wolfenden (England) H Smith	18	18
(Chinese Taipei) Wang C-l (Chinese Taipei) Chen S-y	21	21
(Canada) D Yao (Canada) T Wang	20	13
(Indonesia) K Sukamuljo (Indonesia) M Giovani	22	21

Third round
3/4	(China) Wang YL (China) Huang YQ	21	21
(Netherlands) R Muns (Netherlands) M Sibbald	13	7
(Chinese Taipei) Wang C-l (Chinese Taipei) Chen S-y	11	16
(Indonesia) K Sukamuljo (Indonesia) M Giovani	21	21

Fourth round
3/4	(China) Wang YL (China) Huang YQ	21	21
(Indonesia) K Sukamuljo (Indonesia) M Giovani	15	8

==== Section 4 ====
First round
(Turkey) E Sesalan (Turkey) O Ozer	11	19
(Singapore) T Hee (Singapore) E Chua	21	21
(France) B Kersaudy (France) A Tran	21	21
(Czech Republic) A Mendrek (Czech Republic) I Zychova	9	13
(Japan) Y Kobayashi (Japan) A Sakuramoto	21	18	21
(Russia) G Martynenko (Russia) E Kut	8	21	12
(Australia) A Selladurai (Australia) J Guan	12	16
(Belgium) N Marcoen (Belgium) S van Wel	21	21

Second round
5/8	(South Korea) Kim J-h (South Korea) Kim J-w	18	21	21
(India) H Thandarang (India) M Jakkampudi	21	15	17
(Singapore) T Hee (Singapore) E Chua	12	13
(France) B Kersaudy (France) A Tran	21	21
9/16	(Hong Kong) Lee CH (Hong Kong) Yuen SY	21	21
(Malaysia) Chua KW (Malaysia) J Choong	6	19
(Japan) Y Kobayashi (Japan) A Sakuramoto	21	21
(Belgium) N Marcoen (Belgium) S van Wel	6	16

Third round
5/8	(South Korea) Kim J-h (South Korea) Kim J-w	21	21
(France) B Kersaudy (France) A Tran	14	16
9/16	(Hong Kong) Lee CH (Hong Kong) Yuen SY	21	21
(Japan) Y Kobayashi (Japan) A Sakuramoto	17	15

Fourth round
5/8	(South Korea) Kim J-h (South Korea) Kim J-w	11	19
9/16	(Hong Kong) Lee CH (Hong Kong) Yuen SY	21	21

=== Bottom Half ===
==== Section 5 ====
First round
(Chinese Taipei) Wu H-l (Chinese Taipei) Chen T-y	21	21
(Hong Kong) Chang TC (Hong Kong) Tsang WC	17	14
(South Africa) C Coetzer (South Africa) A Schoonees	17	15
(Turkey) S Koca (Turkey) E Yazgan	21	21
(South Korea) Kim J-h (South Korea) Lee S-h	21	15	21
(Germany) F Roth (Germany) J Karnott	14	21	17
(Japan) T Inoue (Japan) A Yamaguchi	21	21
(Uzbekistan) A Bakhshullaev (Uzbekistan) D Ahmedova	6	3

Second round
(Chinese Taipei) Wu H-l (Chinese Taipei) Chen T-y	21	21
(Turkey) S Koca (Turkey) E Yazgan	18	13
(Canada) N Osborne (Canada) J Wu	12	9
9/16	(Indonesia) P Rhoma (Indonesia) N Istirani	21	21
(South Korea) Kim J-h (South Korea) Lee S-h	21	22
(Japan) T Inoue (Japan) A Yamaguchi	11	20
(France) J Maio (France) S Guerin	18	18
5/8	(Malaysia) Tan WG (Malaysia) Chow MK	21	21

Third round
(Chinese Taipei) Wu H-l (Chinese Taipei) Chen T-y	14	13
9/16	(Indonesia) P Rhoma (Indonesia) N Istirani	21	21
(South Korea) Kim J-h (South Korea) Lee S-h	16	16
5/8	(Malaysia) Tan WG (Malaysia) Chow MK	21	21

Fourth round
9/16	(Indonesia) P Rhoma (Indonesia) N Istirani	21	19	21
5/8	(Malaysia) Tan WG (Malaysia) Chow MK	16	21	9

==== Section 6 ====
First round
(India) S Ravuri (India) M Kukkapalli	11	12
(Republic of Ireland) J Dolan (Republic of Ireland) A Stephenson	21	21
(England) S Parsons (England) J Moore	21	19	17
(Finland) I Heino (Finland) M Lindholm	18	21	21
(United States) W Cheung (United States) C Chen	10	9
(Thailand) D Puavaranukroh (Thailand) P Supajirakul	21	21

Second round
(Republic of Ireland) J Dolan (Republic of Ireland) A Stephenson	21	21
(Finland) I Heino (Finland) M Lindholm	19	14
(Vietnam) Pham CC (Vietnam) Nguyen TL	14	14
9/16	(Netherlands) R Tabeling (Netherlands) M Halkema	21	21
(Thailand) D Puavaranukroh (Thailand) P Supajirakul	21	21
(Bulgaria) D Delchev (Bulgaria) M Ivanova	12	16
(Philippines) A Morada (Philippines) M Caculitan	6	11
3/4	(China) Liu YC (China) Chen QC	21	21

Third round
(Republic of Ireland) J Dolan (Republic of Ireland) A Stephenson	12	13
9/16	(Netherlands) R Tabeling (Netherlands) M Halkema	21	21
(Thailand) D Puavaranukroh (Thailand) P Supajirakul	21	19	8
3/4	(China) Liu YC (China) Chen QC	15	21	21

Fourth round
9/16	(Netherlands) R Tabeling (Netherlands) M Halkema	14	22	13
3/4	(China) Liu YC (China) Chen QC	21	20	21

==== Section 7 ====
First round
(England) A Lane (England) C Birch	21	21
(United States) A Shekhtman (United States) L Wen	10	8
(Ukraine) A Zinukhov (Ukraine) V Gushcha	wo
(Netherlands) M Caljouw (Netherlands) A Chen
(Vietnam) Do TD (Vietnam) Le TH	21	21
(Sri Lanka) S Angodavidanalage (Sri Lanka) K Waduthantri	9	6

Second round
(England) A Lane (England) C Birch	17	15
(Netherlands) M Caljouw (Netherlands) A Chen	21	21
(Belgium) M Put (Belgium) I Lanckriet	14	13
9/16	(Russia) A Zinchenko (Russia) O Morozova	21	21
(Vietnam) Do TD (Vietnam) Le TH	21	19	21
(Malaysia) D Philip (Malaysia) E Khoo	19	21	12
(Australia) S Serasinghe (Australia) G Somerville	10	16
5/8	(South Korea) Jung J-w (South Korea) Shin S-c	21	21

Third round
(Netherlands) M Caljouw (Netherlands) A Chen	13	22
9/16	(Russia) A Zinchenko (Russia) O Morozova	21	24
(Vietnam) Do TD (Vietnam) Le TH	12	22	14
5/8	(South Korea) Jung J-w (South Korea) Shin S-c	21	20	21

Fourth round
9/16	(Russia) A Zinchenko (Russia) O Morozova	11	16
5/8	(South Korea) Jung J-w (South Korea) Shin S-c	21	21

==== Section 8 ====
First round
(Chinese Taipei) Tsai C-y (Chinese Taipei) Chang C-h	21	21
(South Africa) R Naidoo (South Africa) D Botha	17	7
(Turkey) E Ceylan (Turkey) N Yiğit	13	13
(Hong Kong) Tang CM (Hong Kong) Ng WY	21	21
(Bulgaria) V Shishkov (Bulgaria) M Mitsova	12	18
(Singapore) M Ishak (Singapore) Chong FJ	21	21

Second round
(Chinese Taipei) Tsai C-y (Chinese Taipei) Chang C-h	18	21	11
(Hong Kong) Tang CM (Hong Kong) Ng WY	21	18	21
(Finland) K Koljonen (Finland) A Paavola	wo
9/16	(Czech Republic) J Janacek (Czech Republic) L Cerna
(Singapore) M Ishak (Singapore) Chong FJ	21	21
(India) G Raju (India) P Ram	18	15
(Japan) K Miura (Japan) A Watanabe	21	18
2	(Indonesia) E Subaktiar (Indonesia) M Oktavianti	23	21

Third round
(Hong Kong) Tang CM (Hong Kong) Ng WY	21	21
9/16	(Czech Republic) J Janacek (Czech Republic) L Cerna	18	16
(Singapore) M Ishak (Singapore) Chong FJ	13	9
2	(Indonesia) E Subaktiar (Indonesia) M Oktavianti	21	21

Fourth round
(Hong Kong) Tang CM (Hong Kong) Ng WY	14	19
2	(Indonesia) E Subaktiar (Indonesia) M Oktavianti	21	21
