= Maretha Dea Giovani =

Indonesian badminton player

Personal information
- Born: 27 March 1994 (age 32) Sleman, Indonesia
- Height: 1.60 m (5 ft 3 in)
- Weight: 55 kg (121 lb)

Sport
- Country: Indonesia
- Sport: Badminton
- Handedness: Right

Women's doubles
- Highest ranking: 33 (with Suci Rizky Andini 10 December 2015)
- BWF profile
Medal record
Women's badminton
Representing Indonesia
Southeast Asian Games
Bronze medal – third place	2015 Singapore	Women's Doubles
Bronze medal – third place	2015 Singapore	Women's Team

Maretha Dea Giovani (born 27 March 1994) is an Indonesian doubles specialist badminton player affiliated with Mutiara Cardinal Bandung club.

== Achievements ==
=== Southeast Asian Games ===
Women's doubles
Year	Venue	Partner	Opponent	Score	Result
2015	Singapore Indoor Stadium, Singapore	(Indonesia) Suci Rizky Andini	(Malaysia) Amelia Alicia Anscelly (Malaysia) Soong Fie Cho	16–21, 21–23	Bronze

=== BWF Grand Prix ===
The BWF Grand Prix had two levels, the Grand Prix and Grand Prix Gold. It was a series of badminton tournaments sanctioned by the Badminton World Federation (BWF) and played between 2007 and 2017.

Women's doubles
Year	Tournament	Partner	Opponent	Score	Result
2014	Vietnam Open	(Indonesia) Rosyita Eka Putri Sari	(Indonesia) Gebby Ristiyani Imawan (Indonesia) Ni Ketut Mahadewi Istarani	21–19, 15–21, 21–10	(gold) Winner
2015	Vietnam Open	(Indonesia) Suci Rizky Andini	(Thailand) Jongkolphan Kititharakul (Thailand) Rawinda Prajongjai	14–21, 12–21	(silver) Runner-up

BWF Grand Prix Gold tournament
BWF Grand Prix tournament

=== BWF International Challenge/Series ===
Women's doubles
Year	Tournament	Partner	Opponent	Score	Result
2013	Maldives International	(Indonesia) Melvira Oklamona	(Indonesia) Melati Daeva Oktavianti (Indonesia) Rosyita Eka Putri Sari	21–15, 21–15	(gold) Winner
2013	Indonesia International	(Indonesia) Melvira Oklamona	(Indonesia) Shella Devi Aulia (Indonesia) Anggia Shitta Awanda	21–12, 21–18	(gold) Winner
2014	Malaysia International	(Indonesia) Rosyita Eka Putri Sari	(Japan) Ayane Kurihara (Japan) Naru Shinoya	14–21, 17–21	(silver) Runner-up
2015	Austrian Open	(Indonesia) Suci Rizky Andini	(England) Heather Olver (England) Lauren Smith	21–14, 23–21	(gold) Winner
2015	Indonesia International	(Indonesia) Suci Rizky Andini	(Indonesia) Gebby Ristiyani Imawan (Indonesia) Tiara Rosalia Nuraidah	17–21, 14–21	(silver) Runner-up
2016	Tata India International	(Indonesia) Tania Oktaviani Kusumah	(Indonesia) Mychelle Crhystine Bandaso (Indonesia) Serena Kani	8–11, 11–8, 11–2, 9–11, 7–11	(silver) Runner-up

BWF International Challenge tournament
BWF Future Series tournament

== Performance timeline ==
Key

W	Won	F	Finalist	SF	Semi-finalist
QF	Quarter-finalist	#R	Rounds 4, 3, 2, 1	RR	Round-robin stage
Q#	Qualification round	A	Absent	w/d	Withdrew
G	Gold	S	Silver	B	Bronze
NH	Not held	N/A	Not applicable	DNQ	Did not qualify

=== Indonesian team ===
- Senior level

Team event	2015
Southeast Asian Games	B

=== Individual competitions ===
- Senior level

Team event	2015
Southeast Asian Games	B

Tournament	BWF World Tour	Best
Tournament	2018	Best
Thailand Masters	1R	1R (2018)
Indonesia Masters	1R	SF (2015)
Indonesia Masters Super 100	2R	2R (2018)

Tournament	BWF Grand Prix and Grand Prix Gold							Best
Tournament	2011	2012	2013	2014	2015	2016	2017	Best
Vietnam Open	A			W	F	A		W (2014)
Indonesian Masters	1R (WD)	2R (WD); 1R (XD)	1R	QF (WD); 2R (XD)	SF	2R	NH	SF (2015)
