= Badminton at the 2015 SEA Games – Women's doubles =

Women's doubles at the 2015 SEA Games
- Venue: Singapore Indoor Stadium
- Dates: 13–16 June 2015
- Competitors: 22 from 6 nations

Medalists
gold medal	Amelia Alicia Anscelly; Soong Fie Cho	Malaysia
silver medal	Vivian Hoo; Woon Khe Wei	Malaysia
bronze medal	Anggia Shitta Awanda; Ni Ketut Mahadewi Istarani	Indonesia
bronze medal	Maretha Dea Giovani; Suci Rizky Andini	Indonesia

The women's doubles competition in badminton at the 2015 SEA Games is being held from 13 to 16 June 2015 at the Singapore Indoor Stadium in Kallang, Singapore.

== Schedule ==
All times are Singapore Standard Time (UTC+08:00)

Date	Time	Event
Saturday, 13 June 2015	17:30	Round of 16
Sunday, 14 June 2015	17:00	Quarter-final
Monday, 15 June 2015	14:00	Semi-final
Tuesday, 16 June 2015	09:00	Gold medal match

== Results ==
Source: Results Summary

Round of 16; 13 June 17:30
Anggia Shitta Awanda (INA); Ni Ketut Mahadewi Istarani (INA)	21	21
Shinta Mulia Sari (SIN); Vanessa Neo (SIN)	11	15
Lin Khaing Zar (MYA); Yee Le Le (MYA)	9	10
Suci Rizky Andini (INA); Maretha Dea Giovani (INA)	21	21
Amelia Alicia Anscelly (MAS); Soong Fie Cho (MAS)	22	21
Elaine Chua (SIN); Tan Wei Han (SIN)	20	14

Quarterfinal; 14 June 17:00
Vivian Hoo (MAS); Woon Khe Wei (MAS)	21	21
Nguyễn Thị Sen (VIE); Vũ Thị Trang (VIE)	12	9
D Aroonkesorn (THA); K Voravichitchaikul (THA)	16	12
Awanda (INA); Istarani (INA)	21	21
Andini (INA); Giovani (INA)	21	21
Phạm Như Thảo (VIE); Thái Thị Hồng Gấm (VIE)	12	12
Anscelly (MAS); Soong (MAS)	22	21	21
Puttita Supajirakul (THA); Sapsiree Taerattanachai (THA)	24	17	16

Semifinal; 15 June 14:00
Hoo (MAS); Woon (MAS)	21	21
Awanda (INA); Istarani (INA)	12	11
Andini (INA); Giovani (INA)	16	21
Anscelly (MAS); Soong (MAS)	21	23

Gold medal match 16 June 09:00
Hoo (MAS); Woon (MAS)	18	13
Anscelly (MAS); Soong (MAS)	21	21
