= 2014 Vietnam Open Grand Prix =

2014 Vietnam Grand Prix
Tournament details
- Dates: September 1, 2014 - September 7, 2014
- Total prize money: US$50,000
- Venue: Tan Binh Sports Center
- Location: Ho Chi Minh City, Vietnam

The 2014 Vietnam Open Grand Prix is the twelfth Vietnam Open grand prix gold and grand prix tournament of the 2014 BWF Grand Prix Gold and Grand Prix. The tournament is held in Tan Binh Sports Center, Ho Chi Minh City, Vietnam September 1–7, 2014 and has a total purse of $50,000.

== Players by nation ==
Nation	First Round	Second Round	Third Round	Quarterfinals	Semifinals	Final
(Chinese Taipei)	20	12		4	1	
(Indonesia)	19	13	2	8	4	2
(Vietnam)	14	2			3	
(Malaysia)	10	11	3	3	1	
(Russia)	7					
(Thailand)	5	4	1	1		
(Singapore)	5	2		2		
(Hong Kong)	5	1		1		
(England)	2					
(Japan)	1	2	1	1	1	2
(India)	1		1			1
(Netherlands)	1					
(United States)		1				

== Men's singles ==
=== Seeds ===
1. (Indonesia) Dionysius Hayom Rumbaka (champion)
2. (Indonesia) Sony Dwi Kuncoro (withdrew)
3. (Vietnam) Nguyen Tien Minh (semi-final)
4. (Hong Kong) Wong Wing Ki (first round)
5. (India) Prannoy Kumar (final)
6. (Hong Kong) Ng Ka Long (quarter-final)
7. (Thailand) Suppanyu Avihingsanon (third round)
8. (Malaysia) Mohd Arif Abdul Latif (quarter-final)
9. (Indonesia) Andre Kurniawan Tedjono (quarter-final)
10. (Malaysia) Tan Chun Seang (semi-final)
11. (Japan) Riichi Takeshita (first round)
12. (Malaysia) Zulfadli Zulkiffli (third round)
13. (Chinese Taipei) Shih Kuei-chun (withdrew)
14. (Hong Kong) Chan Yan Kit (first round)
15. (India) Ajay Jayaram (third round)
16. (Malaysia) Iskandar Zulkarnain Zainuddin (third round)

=== Finals ===
Quarterfinals
1	(Indonesia) Dionysius Hayom Rumbaka	19	21	22
8	(Malaysia) Mohd Arif Abdul Latif	21	13	20
3	(Vietnam) Nguyen Tien Minh	21	21
6	(Hong Kong) Ng Ka Long	16	8
5	(India) Prannoy Kumar	21	21
9	(Indonesia) Andre Kurniawan Tedjono	13	19
10	(Malaysia) Tan Chun Seang	21	21
Q6	(Japan) Kanta Tsuneyama	13	14

Semifinals
1	(Indonesia) Dionysius Hayom Rumbaka	15	21	23
3	(Vietnam) Nguyen Tien Minh	21	17	21
5	(India) Prannoy Kumar	21	14	24
10	(Malaysia) Tan Chun Seang	16	21	22

Final
1	(Indonesia) Dionysius Hayom Rumbaka	18	21	21
5	(India) Prannoy Kumar	21	15	18

=== Top half ===
==== Section 1 ====
First Round
1	(Indonesia) H Rumbaka	21	21
(Malaysia) Ai WJ	10	5
PFQ	(Indonesia) V Anindita	11	7
(Chinese Taipei) Lu C-h	21	21
11	(Japan) R Takeshita	12	21	19
(Malaysia) Tan KM	21	13	21
Q1	(Chinese Taipei) Lo C-y	17	18
(Indonesia) F Hadmadi	21	21

Second Round
1	(Indonesia) H Rumbaka	21	23
(Chinese Taipei) Lu C-h	15	21
(Malaysia) Tan KM	21	15
(Indonesia) F Hadmadi	23	21

Third Round
1	(Indonesia) H Rumbaka	21	21
(Indonesia) F Hadmadi	12	19

==== Section 2 ====
First Round
8	(Malaysia) A Abdul Latif	21	21
(Indonesia) Hermansyah	13	13
(Chinese Taipei) Yang C-c	21	17	21
(Indonesia) B Pangisthu	6	21	18
15	(India) A Jayaram	22	21
(Malaysia) Soong JV	20	14
(Chinese Taipei) Hsueh H-y	21	21
(England) A Smith	15	9

Second Round
8	(Malaysia) A Abdul Latif	21	10	21
(Chinese Taipei) Yang C-c	17	21	16
15	(India) A Jayaram	21	21
(Chinese Taipei) Hsueh H-y	15	18

Third Round
8	(Malaysia) A Abdul Latif	22	21
15	(India) A Jayaram	20	16

==== Section 3 ====
First Round
3	(Vietnam) Nguyen TM	21	21
(Thailand) S Thammasin	17	7
(Indonesia) T Mahbub	21	21
PFQ	(Vietnam) Nguyen DTK	13	15
14	(Hong Kong) Chan YK	21	19	10
(Indonesia) E Sukamta	12	21	21
Q4	(Chinese Taipei) Lu C-y	12	19
(Malaysia) N Ayub	21	21

Second Round
3	(Vietnam) Nguyen TM	21	21
(Indonesia) T Mahbub	17	16
(Indonesia) E Sukamta	16	19
(Malaysia) N Ayub	21	21

Third Round
3	(Vietnam) Nguyen TM	21	21
(Malaysia) N Ayub	10	14

==== Section 4 ====
First Round
6	(Hong Kong) Ng KL	21	21
Q3	(Vietnam) Duong PN	9	14
(Indonesia) A Yunus	21	21
(Vietnam) Le HA	8	15
12	(Malaysia) Zf Zulkiffli	10	21	21
(Singapore) Huang C	21	18	17
(Thailand) K Phetpradab	21	21
(Indonesia) K Akbar	10	6

Second Round
6	(Hong Kong) Ng KL	18	23	24
(Indonesia) A Yunus	21	21	22
12	(Malaysia) Zf Zulkiffli	20	21	21
(Thailand) K Phetpradab	22	15	19

Third Round
6	(Hong Kong) Ng KL	21	21
12	(Malaysia) Zf Zulkiffli	11	14

=== Bottom half ===
==== Section 5 ====
First Round
(Malaysia) Kuan BH	13	20
(Indonesia) E Kusuma	21	22
(Chinese Taipei) Yang C-h	14	21	18
16	(Malaysia) I Zainuddin	21	19	21
(Singapore) S Lee	16	21	13
(Malaysia) Goh SH	21	18	21
(Indonesia) R Ivanudin	21	16	12
5	(India) P Kumar	19	21	21

Second Round
(Indonesia) E Kusuma	11	9
16	(Malaysia) I Zainuddin	21	21
(Malaysia) Goh SH	23	15
5	(India) P Kumar	25	21

Third Round
16	(Malaysia) I Zainuddin	15	11
5	(India) P Kumar	21	21

==== Section 6 ====
First Round
PFQ	(Malaysia) Zh Zulkiffli	8	19
(Malaysia) Chiang JS	21	21
Q2	(Singapore) R Susilo	20	21	19
9	(Indonesia) A Tedjono	22	15	21
(England) M Spencer-Smith	9	9
(Indonesia) R Subagja	21	21
(Japan) K Nishimoto	19	21	24
4	(Hong Kong) Wong WK	21	15	22

Second Round
(Malaysia) Chiang JS	19	21	19
9	(Indonesia) A Tedjono	21	18	21
(Indonesia) R Subagja	21	21
(Japan) K Nishimoto	13	12

Third Round
9	(Indonesia) A Tedjono	17	21	21
(Indonesia) R Subagja	21	17	18

==== Section 7 ====
First Round
(Japan) Y Yamaguchi	21	14	21
Q5	(Chinese Taipei) Chen C-w	14	21	16
(Indonesia) A Ginting	17	18
10	(Malaysia) Tan CS	21	21
(Malaysia) Chong YH	21	21
(Indonesia) A Susanto	19	12
(Russia) A Yartsev	7	12
7	(Thailand) S Avihingsanon	21	21

Second Round
(Japan) Y Yamaguchi	10	18
10	(Malaysia) Tan CS	21	21
(Malaysia) Chong YH	18	26	14
7	(Thailand) S Avihingsanon	21	24	21

Third Round
10	(Malaysia) Tan CS	22	21
7	(Thailand) S Avihingsanon	20	18

==== Section 8 ====
First Round
Q8	(Vietnam) Truong TL	14	6
Q6	(Japan) K Tsuneyama	21	21
(Singapore) Loh KY	14	21	21
PFQ	(Vietnam) Nguyen HN	21	14	15
Q7	(Japan) H Shimono	17	26	21
(Vietnam) Pham CC	21	24	12
(Chinese Taipei) Yang S-j
2	(Indonesia) S Kuncoro	wo

Second Round
Q6	(Japan) K Tsuneyama	21	14	21
(Singapore) Loh KY	17	21	8
Q7	(Japan) H Shimono	21	21
(Chinese Taipei) Yang S-j	13	18

Third Round
Q6	(Japan) K Tsuneyama	21	21
Q7	(Japan) H Shimono	7	15

== Women's singles ==
=== Seeds ===
1. (Chinese Taipei) Hsu Ya-ching (quarter-final)
2. (Chinese Taipei) Pai Yu-po (quarter-final)
3. (Indonesia) Maria Febe Kusumastuti (quarter-final)
4. (Indonesia) Adriyanti Firdasari (quarter-final)
5. (Japan) Kaori Imabeppu (semi-final)
6. (Malaysia) Yang Li Lian (second round)
7. (Indonesia) Millicent Wiranto (first round)
8. (United States) Iris Wang (second round)

=== Finals ===
Semifinals
(Vietnam) Vu Thi Trang	15	12
(Japan) Nozomi Okuhara	21	21
5	(Japan) Kaori Imabeppu	18	19
(Japan) Aya Ohori	21	21

Final
(Japan) Nozomi Okuhara	21	21
(Japan) Aya Ohori	15	11

=== Top half ===
==== Section 1 ====
First Round
1	(Chinese Taipei) Hsu Y-c	21	21
(Thailand) N Saengchote	14	14
(Chinese Taipei) Chen Sh-y	21	21
(Russia) E Kosetskaya	15	19
6	(Malaysia) Yang LL	23	21	21
Q2	(Chinese Taipei) Chen Su-y	25	11	16
(Indonesia) Y Y Susanto	21	15	16
(Vietnam) Vu TT	17	21	21

Second Round
1	(Chinese Taipei) Hsu Y-c	21	21
(Chinese Taipei) Chen Sh-y	13	16
6	(Malaysia) Yang LL	18	12
(Vietnam) Vu TT	21	21

Quarterfinals
1	(Chinese Taipei) Hsu Y-c	23	19	21
(Vietnam) Vu TT	21	21	23

==== Section 2 ====
First Round
3	(Indonesia) M Kusumastuti	21	21
(Hong Kong) Cheung NY	14	12
(Indonesia) R Riodingin	18	17
(Malaysia) Lim CS	21	21
7	(Indonesia) M Wiranto	13	4
(Japan) N Okuhara	21	21
Q4	(Hong Kong) Chan HY	wo
Q1	(Chinese Taipei) Tang W-y

Second Round
3	(Indonesia) M Kusumastuti	21	29	21
(Malaysia) Lim CS	13	30	19
(Japan) N Okuhara	21	21
Q1	(Chinese Taipei) Tang W-y	11	12

Quarterfinals
3	(Indonesia) M Kusumastuti	13	12
(Japan) N Okuhara	21	21

=== Bottom half ===
==== Section 3 ====
First Round
(Singapore) Liang XY	16	14
(Chinese Taipei) Lin Y-c	21	21
(Indonesia) R Hartawan	16	12
5	(Japan) K Imabeppu	21	21
(Indonesia) H Ramadini	15	21
(Thailand) P Chochuwong	21	23
Q3	(Vietnam) Pham NT	12	16
4	(Indonesia) A Firdasari	21	21

Second Round
(Chinese Taipei) Lin Y-c	10	11
5	(Japan) K Imabeppu	21	21
(Thailand) P Chochuwong	19	21	10
4	(Indonesia) A Firdasari	21	14	21

Quarterfinals
5	(Japan) K Imabeppu	21	16	21
4	(Indonesia) A Firdasari	11	21	7

==== Section 4 ====
First Round
(Japan) A Ohori	21	21
(Vietnam) Le TH	11	10
(Russia) E Bolotova	13	8
8	(United States) I Wang	21	21
(Malaysia) Lim YF	21	16	21
(Chinese Taipei) Hung S-h	18	21	16
(Indonesia) F Angguni	10	6
2	(Chinese Taipei) Pai Y-p	21	21

Second Round
(Japan) A Ohori	21	21
8	(United States) I Wang	10	19
(Malaysia) Lim YF	15	14
2	(Chinese Taipei) Pai Y-p	21	21

Quarterfinals
(Japan) A Ohori	21	21	21
2	(Chinese Taipei) Pai Y-p	23	18	10

== Men's doubles ==
=== Seeds ===
1. (Indonesia) Wahyu Nayaka / Ade Yusuf (quarter-final)
2. (Malaysia) Chooi Kah Ming / Teo Ee Yi (second round)
3. (Chinese Taipei) Huang Po-jui / Lu Ching-yao (quarter-final)
4. (Malaysia) Jagdish Singh / Roni Tan Wee Long (first round)
5. (Indonesia) Ronald Alexander / Alfian Eko Prasetya (semi-final)
6. (Indonesia) Selvanus Geh / Kevin Sanjaya Sukamuljo (second round)
7. (Indonesia) Andrei Adistia / Hendra Aprida Gunawan (champion)
8. (Japan) Kenta Kazuno / Kazushi Yamada (final)

=== Finals ===
Semifinals
7	(Indonesia) Andrei Adistia (Indonesia) Hendra Aprida Gunawan	21	22
Q4	(Indonesia) Yohanes Rendy Sugiarto (Indonesia) Afiat Yuris Wirawan	13	20
8	(Japan) Kenta Kazuno (Japan) Kazushi Yamada	21	21
5	(Indonesia) Ronald Alexander (Indonesia) Alfian Eko Prasetya	16	16

Final
7	(Indonesia) Andrei Adistia (Indonesia) Hendra Aprida Gunawan	15	23	21
8	(Japan) Kenta Kazuno (Japan) Kazushi Yamada	21	21	17

=== Top half ===
==== Section 1 ====
First Round
1	(Indonesia) W Nayaka (Indonesia) A Yusuf	16	21	21
(Malaysia) Chow PC (Malaysia) Mak HC	21	16	18
Q1	(Thailand) K Ketlen (Thailand) D Puavaranukroh	13	19
(Chinese Taipei) Liao C-h (Chinese Taipei) Tien J-c	21	21
7	(Indonesia) A Adistia (Indonesia) H Gunawan	21	21
Q2	(Indonesia) R Akbar (Indonesia) D Prawissa	18	10
(Malaysia) N Heg (Malaysia) Low JS	21	19	21
(Russia) R Kargaev (Russia) A Yartsev	17	21	16

Second Round
1	(Indonesia) W Nayaka (Indonesia) A Yusuf	21	21
(Chinese Taipei) Liao C-h (Chinese Taipei) Tien J-c	18	18
7	(Indonesia) A Adistia (Indonesia) H Gunawan	21	21
(Malaysia) N Heg (Malaysia) Low JS	13	15

Quarterfinals
1	(Indonesia) W Nayaka (Indonesia) A Yusuf	16	21	17
7	(Indonesia) A Adistia (Indonesia) H Gunawan	21	13	21

==== Section 2 ====
First Round
4	(Malaysia) J Singh (Malaysia) R Tan	19	13
Q4	(Indonesia) R Sugiarto (Indonesia) A Wirawan	21	21
Q3	(Singapore) T Hee (Singapore) H Wijaya	21	21
(Chinese Taipei) Lin C-y (Chinese Taipei) Wu H-l	16	19
5	(Indonesia) S Geh (Indonesia) K Sukamuljo	21	21
(Netherlands) R Bosch (Chinese Taipei) Tien T-c	16	19
(Chinese Taipei) Chang K-l (Chinese Taipei) Su Y-n	21	21
(Malaysia) Tai AK (Malaysia) Woon MC	13	15

Second Round
Q4	(Indonesia) R Sugiarto (Indonesia) A Wirawan	21	21
Q3	(Singapore) T Hee (Singapore) H Wijaya	13	13
5	(Indonesia) S Geh (Indonesia) K Sukamuljo	21	19	17
(Chinese Taipei) Chang K-l (Chinese Taipei) Su Y-n	12	21	21

Quarterfinals
Q4	(Indonesia) R Sugiarto (Indonesia) A Wirawan	25	21	21
(Chinese Taipei) Chang K-l (Chinese Taipei) Su Y-n	27	7	7

=== Bottom half ===
==== Section 3 ====
First Round
(Chinese Taipei) Liu W-c (Chinese Taipei) Yang P-h	21	21
(India) Sanjeeth S. (India) J Yadav	12	10
(Indonesia) A Sudrajat (Indonesia) T Supriadi	21	15	13
8	(Japan) K Kazuno (Japan) K Yamada	19	21	21
(Malaysia) D Devadass (Malaysia) Ong YS	17	18
(Indonesia) F Kurniawan (Indonesia) A P R Putra	21	21
(Indonesia) C Rusdianto (Indonesia) T Wardhana	16	11
3	(Chinese Taipei) Huang P-j (Chinese Taipei) Lu C-y	21	21

Second Round
(Chinese Taipei) Liu W-c (Chinese Taipei) Yang P-h	18	21	20
8	(Japan) K Kazuno (Japan) K Yamada	21	19	22
(Indonesia) F Kurniawan (Indonesia) A P R Putra	14	16
3	(Chinese Taipei) Huang P-j (Chinese Taipei) Lu C-y	21	21

Quarterfinals
8	(Japan) K Kazuno (Japan) K Yamada	21	21
3	(Chinese Taipei) Huang P-j (Chinese Taipei) Lu C-y	13	19

==== Section 4 ====
First Round
(Chinese Taipei) Hung Y-y (Chinese Taipei) Su C-h	21	16	21
(Malaysia) R Abdul Latif (Malaysia) Z Abdul Latif	16	21	12
(Vietnam) Duong BD (Vietnam) Nguyen HN	13	20
5	(Indonesia) R Alexander (Indonesia) A Prasetya	21	22
(Malaysia) V Mawan (Malaysia) F Tazari	16	13
(Indonesia) A Chandra (Indonesia) Y Dasuki	21	21
(Thailand) W Buranakuea (Thailand) T Potieng	21	11
2	(Malaysia) Chooi KM (Malaysia) Teo EY	23	21

Second Round
(Chinese Taipei) Hung Y-y (Chinese Taipei) Su C-h	15	17
5	(Indonesia) R Alexander (Indonesia) A Prasetya	21	21
(Indonesia) A Chandra (Indonesia) Y Dasuki	23	9	21
2	(Malaysia) Chooi KM (Malaysia) Teo EY	21	21	19

Quarterfinals
5	(Indonesia) R Alexander (Indonesia) A Prasetya	21	21
(Indonesia) A Chandra (Indonesia) Y Dasuki	14	18

== Women's doubles ==
=== Seeds ===
1. (Thailand) Jongkonphan Kittiharakul / Rawinda Prajongjai (second round)
2. (Indonesia) Shendy Puspa Irawati / Vita Marissa (second round)
3. (Indonesia) Dian Fitriani / Nadya Melati (quarter-final)
4. (Indonesia) Keshya Nurvita Hanadia / Devi Tika Permatasari (second round)

=== Finals ===
Semifinals
(Indonesia) Maretha Dea Giovani (Indonesia) Rosyita Eka Putri Sari	21	21
(Vietnam) Nguyen Thi Sen (Vietnam) Vu Thi Trang	19	14
(Chinese Taipei) Chiang Kai-hsin (Chinese Taipei) Hung Shih-han	13	17
(Indonesia) Gebby Ristiyani Imawan (Indonesia) Ni Ketut Mahadewi Istirani	21	21

Final
(Indonesia) Maretha Dea Giovani (Indonesia) Rosyita Eka Putri Sari	21	15	21
(Indonesia) Gebby Ristiyani Imawan (Indonesia) Ni Ketut Mahadewi Istirani	19	21	10

=== Top half ===
==== Section 1 ====
First Round
1	(Thailand) J Kittiharakul (Thailand) R Prajongjai
BYE
(Chinese Taipei) Chen S-y (Chinese Taipei) Huang Y-t	6	17
(Indonesia) M Giovani (Indonesia) R Putri Sari	21	21
(Thailand) C Chaladchalam (Thailand) N Saengchote	27	21
(Indonesia) M Oklamona (Indonesia) A Saufika	29	23
(Singapore) Tan WH (Singapore) D Yuliana
(Vietnam) Le HT (Vietnam) Nguyen TMA	wo

Second Round
1	(Thailand) J Kittiharakul (Thailand) R Prajongjai	16	18
(Indonesia) M Giovani (Indonesia) R Putri Sari	21	21
(Indonesia) M Oklamona (Indonesia) A Saufika	21	21	14
(Singapore) Tan WH (Singapore) D Yuliana	12	23	21

Quarterfinals
(Indonesia) M Giovani (Indonesia) R Putri Sari	21	21
(Singapore) Tan WH (Singapore) D Yuliana	17	19

==== Section 2 ====
First Round
3	(Indonesia) D Fitriani (Indonesia) N Melati
BYE
(Russia) E Bolotova (Russia) E Kosetskaya	18	13
(Malaysia) J Choong (Malaysia) Yap CW	21	21
(Chinese Taipei) Lin T-y (Chinese Taipei) Wu T-j	17	14
(Indonesia) R Amelia (Indonesia) K Dewi	21	21
(Indonesia) V Aprilsasi (Indonesia) M Jauhari	20	21
(Vietnam) Nguyen TS (Vietnam) Vu TT	22	23

Second Round
3	(Indonesia) D Fitriani (Indonesia) N Melati	21	21
(Malaysia) J Choong (Malaysia) Yap CW	10	11
(Indonesia) R Amelia (Indonesia) K Dewi	13	17
(Vietnam) Nguyen TS (Vietnam) Vu TT	21	21

Quarterfinals
3	(Indonesia) D Fitriani (Indonesia) N Melati	17	17
(Vietnam) Nguyen TS (Vietnam) Vu TT	21	21

=== Bottom half ===
==== Section 3 ====
First Round
(Chinese Taipei) Hung S-c (Chinese Taipei) Lin X-m	23	18	18
(Thailand) P Chochuwong (Thailand) C Teachavorasinskun	21	21	21
(Chinese Taipei) Chen S-y (Chinese Taipei) Lin Y-c	20	21	21
(Vietnam) Dang KN (Vietnam) Le TTT	22	17	15
(Vietnam) Le TH (Vietnam) Pham NT	17	13
(Chinese Taipei) Chiang K-h (Chinese Taipei) Hung S-h	21	21
(Chinese Taipei) Wen H-y (Chinese Taipei) Ye J-y	12	21	11
4	(Indonesia) K Hanadia (Indonesia) D Permatasari	21	14	21

Second Round
(Thailand) P Chochuwong (Thailand) C Teachavorasinskun	21	21
(Chinese Taipei) Chen S-y (Chinese Taipei) Lin Y-c	12	5
(Chinese Taipei) Chiang K-h (Chinese Taipei) Hung S-h	23	17	21
4	(Indonesia) K Hanadia (Indonesia) D Permatasari	21	21	17

Quarterfinals
(Thailand) P Chochuwong (Thailand) C Teachavorasinskun	13	21	15
(Chinese Taipei) Chiang K-h (Chinese Taipei) Hung S-h	21	17	21

==== Section 4 ====
First Round
(Indonesia) G Imawan (Indonesia) K Mahadewi	21	24
(Vietnam) Nguyen TAD (Vietnam) Nguyen TBT	15	22
(Chinese Taipei) Chen H-y (Chinese Taipei) Huang M-c	15	21	21
(Vietnam) Nguyen TPH (Vietnam) Nguyen TL	21	10	7
(Malaysia) Cheah YS (Malaysia) Goh YC	21	21
(Vietnam) Nguyen TTM (Vietnam) Tran TTX	12	10
BYE
2	(Indonesia) S Irawati (Indonesia) V Marissa

Second Round
(Indonesia) G Imawan (Indonesia) K Mahadewi	21	21
(Chinese Taipei) Chen H-y (Chinese Taipei) Huang M-c	15	15
(Malaysia) Cheah YS (Malaysia) Goh YC	15	21	21
2	(Indonesia) S Irawati (Indonesia) V Marissa	21	13	17

Quarterfinals
(Indonesia) G Imawan (Indonesia) K Mahadewi	21	21
(Malaysia) Cheah YS (Malaysia) Goh YC	14	16

== Mixed doubles ==
=== Seeds ===
1. (Indonesia) Muhammad Rijal / Vita Marissa (champion)
2. (Indonesia) Irfan Fadhilah / Weni Anggraini (final)
3. (Russia) Anatoliy Yartsev / Evgeniya Kosetskaya (first round)
4. (Indonesia) Alfian Eko Prasetya / Annisa Saufika (quarter-final)
5. (Chinese Taipei) Lin Chia-yu / Wu Ti-jung (first round)
6. (Malaysia) Wong Fai Yin / Chow Mei Kuan (quarter-final)
7. (Hong Kong) Wong Wai Hong / Chan Hung Yung (first round)
8. (Indonesia) Yonathan Suryatama Dasuki / Variella Aprilsasi (quarter-final)

=== Finals ===
Semifinals
1	(Indonesia) Muhammad Rijal (Indonesia) Vita Marissa	21	21
(Indonesia) Ronald Alexander (Indonesia) Melati Daeva Oktaviani	11	18
(Indonesia) Fran Kurniawan (Indonesia) Shendy Puspa Irawati	19	19
2	(Indonesia) Irfan Fadhilah (Indonesia) Weni Anggraini	21	21

Final
1	(Indonesia) Muhammad Rijal (Indonesia) Vita Marissa	21	21
2	(Indonesia) Irfan Fadhilah (Indonesia) Weni Anggraini	18	10

=== Top half ===
==== Section 1 ====
First Round
1	(Indonesia) M Rijal (Indonesia) V Marissa	21	21
(Chinese Taipei) Liu W-c (Chinese Taipei) Wen H-y	10	13
(Hong Kong) Tang CM (Hong Kong) Chan TK	21	21
(Canada) H Wiebe (Canada) G Gao	12	13
8	(Indonesia) Y Dasuki (Indonesia) V Aprilsasi	21	21
(Chinese Taipei) Hung Y-y (Chinese Taipei) Chen H-y	14	9
(Indonesia) A Adistia (Indonesia) D Fitriani	21	21
Q1	(Indonesia) C Rusdianto (Indonesia) N Melati	15	17

Second Round
1	(Indonesia) M Rijal (Indonesia) V Marissa	21	24
(Hong Kong) Tang CM (Hong Kong) Chan TK	4	22
8	(Indonesia) Y Dasuki (Indonesia) V Aprilsasi	21	21
(Indonesia) A Adistia (Indonesia) D Fitriani	19	17

Quarterfinals
1	(Indonesia) M Rijal (Indonesia) V Marissa	21	21
8	(Indonesia) Y Dasuki (Indonesia) V Aprilsasi	9	13

==== Section 2 ====
First Round
3	(Russia) A Yartsev (Russia) E Kosetskaya	17	16
(Indonesia) R Alexander (Indonesia) M Oktaviani	21	21
(Vietnam) Dao MT (Vietnam) Pham NT
(Indonesia) A Wirawan (Indonesia) K Dewi	wo
5	(Chinese Taipei) Lin C-y (Chinese Taipei) Wu T-j	19	20
(Singapore) T Hee (Singapore) Tan WH	21	22
(Malaysia) Tan CT (Malaysia) Lai SJ	21	21
(Indonesia) T Wardhana (Indonesia) M Jauhari	16	15

Second Round
(Indonesia) R Alexander (Indonesia) M Oktaviani	21	21
(Vietnam) Dao MT (Vietnam) Pham NT	18	18
(Singapore) T Hee (Singapore) Tan WH	21	21
(Malaysia) Tan CT (Malaysia) Lai SJ	16	15

Quarterfinals
(Indonesia) R Alexander (Indonesia) M Oktaviani	21	21
(Singapore) T Hee (Singapore) Tan WH	16	15

=== Bottom half ===
==== Section 3 ====
First Round
Q3	(Indonesia) R Sugiarto (Indonesia) R Amelia	18	19
(Indonesia) F Kurniawan (Indonesia) S Irawati	21	21
(Indonesia) K Sukamuljo (Indonesia) M Giovani	21	17	21
7	(Hong Kong) Wong WH (Hong Kong) Chan HY	17	21	11
(Thailand) T Viriyangkura (Thailand) P Chochuwong	17	21	21
(Singapore) Loh KH (Singapore) D Yuliana	21	15	18
(Chinese Taipei) Su C-h (Chinese Taipei) Ye J-y	15	21	12
4	(Indonesia) A Prasetya (Indonesia) A Saufika	21	17	21

Second Round
(Indonesia) F Kurniawan (Indonesia) S Irawati	21	21
(Indonesia) K Sukamuljo (Indonesia) M Giovani	11	8
(Thailand) T Viriyangkura (Thailand) P Chochuwong	14	11
4	(Indonesia) A Prasetya (Indonesia) A Saufika	21	21

Quarterfinals
(Indonesia) F Kurniawan (Indonesia) S Irawati	15	21	21
4	(Indonesia) A Prasetya (Indonesia) A Saufika	21	19	15

==== Section 4 ====
First Round
Q4	(Indonesia) L Nugroho (Indonesia) M Mahmudin	19	21	21
(Chinese Taipei) Tien T-c (Chinese Taipei) Chiang K-h	21	16	12
(Russia) R Kargaev (Russia) E Bolotova	21	9	10
6	(Malaysia) Wong FY (Malaysia) Chow MK	15	21	21
(Chinese Taipei) Yang P-h (Chinese Taipei) Huang M-c	16	21	13
Q2	(Vietnam) Duong BD (Vietnam) Thai THG	21	17	21
(Chinese Taipei) Wu H-l (Chinese Taipei) Lin T-y	16	21	7
2	(Indonesia) I Fadhilah (Indonesia) W Anggraini	21	17	21

Second Round
Q4	(Indonesia) L Nugroho (Indonesia) M Mahmudin	19	21	17
6	(Malaysia) Wong FY (Malaysia) Chow MK	21	16	21
Q2	(Vietnam) Duong BD (Vietnam) Thai THG	16	17
2	(Indonesia) I Fadhilah (Indonesia) W Anggraini	21	21

Quarterfinals
6	(Malaysia) Wong FY (Malaysia) Chow MK	16	21	12
2	(Indonesia) I Fadhilah (Indonesia) W Anggraini	21	15	21

Preceded by 2014 Brazil Open Grand Prix	BWF Grand Prix Gold and Grand Prix; 2014 season	Succeeded by 2014 Indonesia Masters Grand Prix Gold
