= Gebby Ristiyani Imawan =

Indonesian badminton player

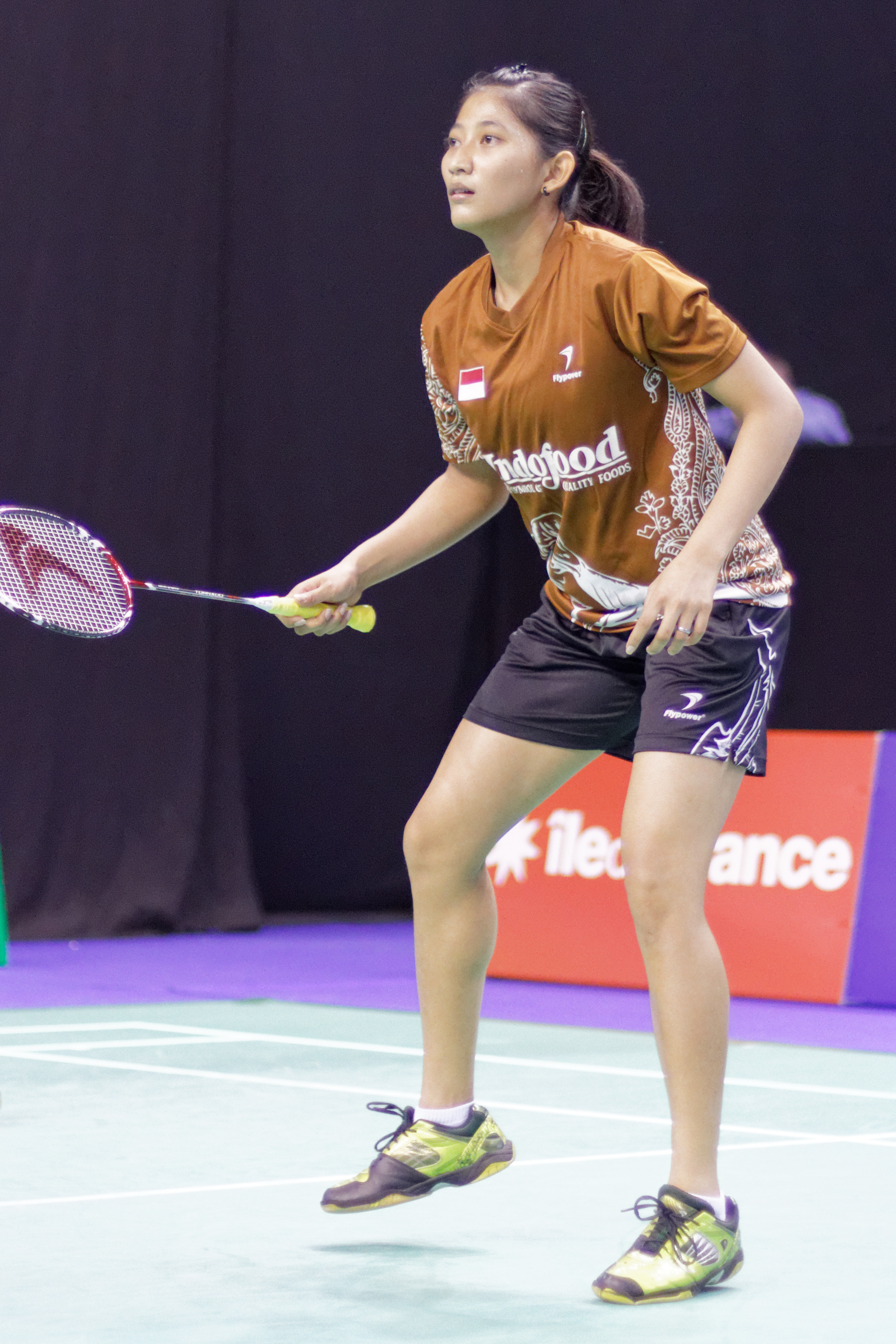
- Gebby Ristiyani Imawan at the 2013 French Open Superseries

Personal information
- Born: 6 March 1992 (age 34) Tangerang, Banten, Indonesia
- Height: 1.65 m (5 ft 5 in)
- Weight: 58 kg (128 lb)

Sport
- Country: Indonesia
- Sport: Badminton
- Handedness: Right

Women's doubles
- Highest ranking: 15 (with Tiara Rosalia Nuraidah, 26 September 2013)
- BWF profile
Medal record
Women's badminton
Representing Indonesia
Asian Championships
| Bronze medal – third place | 2013 Taipei | Women's doubles |
Asian Junior Championships
| Bronze medal – third place | 2010 Kuala Lumpur | Mixed team |

Gebby Ristiyani Imawan (born 6 March 1992) is an Indonesian badminton player affiliated with Mutiara Cardinal Bandung club. She won a bronze medal at the 2013 Asian Championships, and at the same year, she participated at the World Championships and SEA Games.

== Achievements ==
=== Asian Championships ===
Women's doubles
| Year | Venue | Partner | Opponent | Score | Result |
|---|---|---|---|---|---|
| 2013 | Taipei Arena; Taipei, Taiwan | (Indonesia) Tiara Rosalia Nuraidah | (China) Ma Jin (China) Tang Jinhua | 18–21, 8–21 | Bronze |

=== BWF Grand Prix (1 runner-up) ===
The BWF Grand Prix had two levels, the Grand Prix and Grand Prix Gold. It was a series of badminton tournaments sanctioned by the Badminton World Federation (BWF) and played between 2007 and 2017.

Women's doubles
| Year | Tournament | Partner | Opponent | Score | Result |
|---|---|---|---|---|---|
| 2014 | Vietnam Open | (Indonesia) Ni Ketut Mahadewi Istarani | (Indonesia) Maretha Dea Giovani (Indonesia) Rosyita Eka Putri Sari | 19–21, 21–15, 10–21 | (silver) Runner-up |

BWF Grand Prix Gold tournament
BWF Grand Prix tournament

=== International Challenge/Series (4 titles, 2 runners-up) ===
Women's doubles
| Year | Tournament | Partner | Opponent | Score | Result |
|---|---|---|---|---|---|
| 2010 | Malaysia International | (Indonesia) Tiara Rosalia Nuraidah | (Malaysia) Chin Eei Hui (Malaysia) Lai Pei Jing | 5–21, 10–21 | (silver) Runner-up |
| 2011 | India International | (Indonesia) Tiara Rosalia Nuraidah | (Indonesia) Suci Rizky Andini (Indonesia) Della Destiara Haris | 21–23, 13–21 | (silver) Runner-up |
| 2014 | Bulgarian International | (Indonesia) Della Destiara Haris | (Indonesia) Ririn Amelia (Indonesia) Komala Dewi | 21–9, 18–21, 21–18 | (gold) Winner |
| 2015 | USM Indonesia International | (Indonesia) Tiara Rosalia Nuraidah | (Indonesia) Anggia Shitta Awanda (Indonesia) Ni Ketut Mahadewi Istarani | 21–13, 21–11 | (gold) Winner |
| 2015 | Indonesia International | (Indonesia) Tiara Rosalia Nuraidah | (Indonesia) Suci Rizky Andini (Indonesia) Maretha Dea Giovani | 21–17, 21–14 | (gold) Winner |
| 2015 | Vietnam International Series | (Indonesia) Tiara Rosalia Nuraidah | (Indonesia) Nisak Puji Lestari (Indonesia) Meirisa Cindy Sahputri | 21–8, 19–21, 21–15 | (gold) Winner |

BWF International Challenge tournament
BWF Future Series tournament

== Performance timeline ==
Key

| W | Won | F | Finalist | SF | Semi-finalist |
| QF | Quarter-finalist | #R | Rounds 4, 3, 2, 1 | RR | Round-robin stage |
| Q# | Qualification round | A | Absent | w/d | Withdrew |
| G | Gold | S | Silver | B | Bronze |
| NH | Not held | N/A | Not applicable | DNQ | Did not qualify |

=== Indonesian team ===
- Junior level

| Team event | 2010 |
|---|---|
| Asian Junior Championships | B |

=== Individual competitions ===
- Senior level

| Event | 2013 |
|---|---|
| Southeast Asian Games | QF |
| Asian Championships | B |
| World Championships | 2R |

| Tournament | 2010 | 2011 | 2012 | 2013 | 2014 | 2015 | Best |
|---|---|---|---|---|---|---|---|
BWF Grand Prix and Grand Prix Gold
| Vietnam Open | 2R | 2R | 2R | A | F | QF | F (2014) |
