= Shela Devi Aulia =

Indonesian badminton player

Personal information
- Born: 4 July 1994 (age 32) Bekasi, West Java, Indonesia
- Height: 1.68 m (5 ft 6 in)
- Weight: 67 kg (148 lb)

Sport
- Country: Indonesia
- Sport: Badminton
- Handedness: Right

Women's & mixed doubles
- Highest ranking: 51 (WD 21 March 2013); 19 (XD 19 January 2017)
- BWF profile
Medal record
Women's badminton
Representing Indonesia
SEA Games
Bronze medal – third place	2017 Kuala Lumpur	Women's team
World Junior Championships
Silver medal – second place	2011 Taipei	Girls' doubles
Silver medal – second place	2012 Chiba	Mixed doubles

Shela Devi Aulia (born 4 July 1994) is an Indonesian badminton player affiliated with Jaya Raya Jakarta club. She was the silver medalists in girls' and mixed doubles event at the BWF World Junior Championships.

== Achievements ==
=== BWF World Junior Championships ===
Girls' doubles
Year	Venue	Partner	Opponent	Score	Result
2011	Taoyuan Arena; Taoyuan City, Taipei, Taiwaa	(Indonesia) Anggia Shitta Awanda	(South Korea) Lee So-hee (South Korea) Shin Seung-chan	16–21, 21–13, 9–21	Silver

Mixed doubles
Year	Venue	Partner	Opponent	Score	Result
2012	Chiba Port Arena; Chiba, Japan	(Indonesia) Alfian Eko Prasetya	(Indonesia) Edi Subaktiar (Indonesia) Melati Daeva Oktavianti	17–21, 13–21	Silver

=== BWF International Challenge/Series (4 titles, 4 runners-up) ===
Women's doubles
Year	Tournament	Partner	Opponent	Score	Result
2013	Indonesia International	(Indonesia) Anggia Shitta Awanda	(Indonesia) Maretha Dea Giovani (Indonesia) Melvira Oklamona	12–21, 18–21	(silver) Runner-up
2018	Indonesia International	(Indonesia) Pia Zebadiah Bernadet	(Malaysia) Lim Chiew Sien (Malaysia) Tan Sueh Jeou	21–17, 21–12	(gold) Winner

Mixed doubles
Year	Tournament	Partner	Opponent	Score	Result
2014	USM Indonesia International	(Indonesia) Hafiz Faizal	(Indonesia) Lukhi Apri Nugroho (Indonesia) Masita Mahmudin	21–23, 21–18, 14–21	(silver) Runner-up
2014	Malaysia International	(Indonesia) Hafiz Faizal	(Singapore) Terry Hee (Singapore) Tan Wei Han	19–21, 21–19, 21–18	(gold) Winner
2015	Singapore International	(Indonesia) Hafiz Faizal	(Thailand) Tinn Isriyanet (Thailand) Savitree Amitrapai	21–14, 21–17	(gold) Winner
2015	Malaysia International	(Indonesia) Hafiz Faizal	(Thailand) Bodin Isara (Thailand) Savitree Amitrapai	13–21, 6–21	(silver) Runner-up
2018	Indonesia International	(Indonesia) Amri Syahnawi	(Indonesia) Irfan Fadhilah (Indonesia) Pia Zebadiah Bernadet	21–17, 21–16	(gold) Winner
2018	Indonesia International	(Indonesia) Adnan Maulana	(Japan) Kohei Gondo (Japan) Ayane Kurihara	17–21, 21–23	(silver) Runner-up

BWF International Challenge tournament
BWF International Series tournament

=== BWF Junior International ===
Mixed doubles
Year	Tournament	Partner	Opponent	Score	Result
2010	Indonesia Junior International	(Indonesia) Hafiz Faizal	(Indonesia) Dandi Prabudita (Indonesia) Deariska Putri Medita	22–20, 21–19	(gold) Winner
2011	Indonesia Junior International	(Indonesia) Hafiz Faizal	(Indonesia) Putra Eka Rhoma (Indonesia) Aris Budiharti	21–14, 15–21, 23–21	(gold) Winner

BWF Junior International Grand Prix tournament
BWF Junior International Challenge tournament
BWF Junior International Series tournament
BWF Junior Future Series tournament

== Performance timeline ==
=== National team ===
- Senior level

Team event	2017
SEA Games	Bronze

=== Individual competitions ===
- Junior level

Event	2011	2012
World Junior Championships	Silver (GD)	Silver (XD)

- Senior level

Tournament	BWF World Tour	Best
Tournament	2018	Best
Indonesia Masters Super 100	R1 (WD); R1 (XD)	R1 (2018)

== Record against selected opponents ==
Mixed doubles results with Hafiz Faizal against World Superseries finalists, World Superseries Finals semifinalists, World Championships semifinalists, and Olympic quarterfinalists.

- (China) Lu Kai & Huang Yaqiong 1–0
- (Indonesia) Muhammad Rijal & Vita Marissa 0–2
- (Indonesia) Praveen Jordan & Debby Susanto 0–1
