= Chinese Taipei Masters =

The Chinese Taipei Masters was an international badminton tournament held in Taiwan from 2015 to 2016. The level of the tournament was BWF Grand Prix tournament.

== Past winners ==
Year	Men's singles	Women's singles	Men's doubles	Women's doubles	Mixed doubles
2015	(Indonesia) Sony Dwi Kuncoro	(South Korea) Lee Jang-mi	(Indonesia) Marcus Fernaldi Gideon (Indonesia) Kevin Sanjaya Sukamuljo	(Indonesia) Anggia Shitta Awanda (Indonesia) Ni Ketut Mahadewi Istarani	(Indonesia) Ronald Alexander (Indonesia) Melati Daeva Oktavianti
2016	(India) Sourabh Varma	(Japan) Ayumi Mine	(Indonesia) Fajar Alfian (Indonesia) Muhammad Rian Ardianto	(Japan) Yuki Fukushima (Japan) Sayaka Hirota	(Hong Kong) Tang Chun Man (Hong Kong) Tse Ying Suet

== Performances by nation ==
Pos	Nation	MS	WS	MD	WD	XD	Total
1	Indonesia	1		2	1	1	5
2	Japan		1		1		2
3	South Korea		1				1
3	Hong Kong					1	1
3	India	1					1
Total		2	2	2	2	2	10

== See also ==
- List of sporting events in Taiwan
