= Soong Fie Cho =

Malaysian badminton player (born 1989)

Soong Fie Cho 宋佩珠
Personal information
- Born: 5 January 1989 (age 37) Lahad Datu, Sabah, Malaysia
- Height: 1.70 m (5 ft 7 in)
- Weight: 58 kg (128 lb)

Sport
- Country: Malaysia
- Sport: Badminton
- Handedness: Right

Women's & mixed doubles
- Highest ranking: 17 (WD 19 November 2015); 63 (XD 4 December 2014)
- BWF profile
Medal record
Women's badminton
Representing Malaysia
SEA Games
Gold medal – first place	2015 Singapore	Women's doubles
Silver medal – second place	2015 Singapore	Women's team

Soong Fie Cho (宋佩珠; born 5 January 1989) is a Malaysian badminton player. She won the 2015 Grand Prix Gold title at the Syed Modi International tournament in the women's doubles event partnered with Amelia Alicia Anscelly. She and Anscelly also won the gold medal at the 2015 SEA Games.

== Achievements ==
=== SEA Games ===
Women's doubles
Year	Venue	Partner	Opponent	Score	Result
2015	Singapore Indoor Stadium, Singapore	(Malaysia) Amelia Alicia Anscelly	(Malaysia) Vivian Hoo (Malaysia) Woon Khe Wei	21–18, 21–13	Gold

=== BWF Grand Prix ===
The BWF Grand Prix had two levels, the Grand Prix and Grand Prix Gold. It was a series of badminton tournaments sanctioned by the Badminton World Federation (BWF) and played between 2007 and 2017.

Women's doubles
Year	Tournament	Partner	Opponent	Score	Result
2013	Vietnam Open	(Malaysia) Amelia Alicia Anscelly	(South Korea) Go Ah-ra (South Korea) Yoo Hae-won	21–12, 10–21, 9–21	(silver) Runner-up
2015	Syed Modi International	(Malaysia) Amelia Alicia Anscelly	(Malaysia) Vivian Hoo (Malaysia) Woon Khe Wei	22–20, 21–15	(gold) Winner

BWF Grand Prix Gold tournament
BWF Grand Prix tournament

=== BWF International Challenge/Series ===
Women's doubles
Year	Tournament	Partner	Opponent	Score	Result
2012	Vietnam International	(Malaysia) Amelia Alicia Anscelly	(Indonesia) Pia Zebadiah Bernadet (Indonesia) Rizki Amelia Pradipta	10–21, 15–21	(silver) Runner-up
2013	Iran Fajr International	(Malaysia) Amelia Alicia Anscelly	(Canada) Nicole Grether (Canada) Charmaine Reid	21–18, 21–15	(gold) Winner
2013	French International	(Malaysia) Amelia Alicia Anscelly	(Japan) Rie Eto (Japan) Yu Wakita	17–21, 17–21	(silver) Runner-up
2013	Malaysia International	(Malaysia) Amelia Alicia Anscelly	(Japan) Kugo Asumi (Japan) Yui Miyauchi	17–21, 14–21	(silver) Runner-up
2014	Iran Fajr International	(Malaysia) Amelia Alicia Anscelly	(Turkey) Özge Bayrak (Turkey) Neslihan Yiğit	21–11, 21–19	(gold) Winner
2017	Indonesia International	(Malaysia) Tee Jing Yi	(Indonesia) Dian Fitriani (Indonesia) Nadya Melati	21–16, 16–21, 21–19	(gold) Winner
2017	Malaysia International	(Malaysia) Tee Jing Yi	(Thailand) Kittipak Dubthuk (Thailand) Natcha Saengchote	21–16, 21–17	(gold) Winner
2018	Malaysia International	(Malaysia) Tee Jing Yi	(Malaysia) Lim Chiew Sien (Malaysia) Tan Sueh Jeou	21–13, 21–10	(gold) Winner

BWF International Challenge tournament
BWF International Series tournament
