= Amelia Alicia Anscelly =

Malaysian badminton player (born 1988)

Personal information
- Born: 26 April 1988 (age 38) Kota Kinabalu, Malaysia
- Height: 1.63 m (5 ft 4 in)
- Weight: 57 kg (126 lb)

Sport
- Country: Malaysia
- Sport: Badminton
- Handedness: Right

Women's & mixed doubles
- Highest ranking: 17 (WD 19 November 2015); 64 (XD 21 June 2012)
- BWF profile
Medal record
Women's badminton
Representing Malaysia
SEA Games
Gold medal – first place	2015 Singapore	Women's doubles
Silver medal – second place	2015 Singapore	Women's team
Bronze medal – third place	2007 Nakhon Ratchasima	Women's team
World Junior Championships
Bronze medal – third place	2006 Incheon	Mixed team

Amelia Alicia Anscelly (born 26 April 1988) is a Malaysian badminton player who specializes in doubles. In 2015, she won the Grand Prix Gold title at the Syed Modi International tournament in the women's doubles event partnered with Soong Fie Cho. She and Soong also won the gold medal at the 2015 SEA Games.

== Achievements ==
=== SEA Games ===
Women's doubles
Year	Venue	Partner	Opponent	Score	Result
2015	Singapore Indoor Stadium; Singapore	(Malaysia) Soong Fie Cho	(Malaysia) Vivian Hoo (Malaysia) Woon Khe Wei	21–18, 21–13	Gold

=== BWF Grand Prix ===
The BWF Grand Prix had two levels, the Grand Prix and Grand Prix Gold. It was a series of badminton tournaments sanctioned by the Badminton World Federation (BWF) and played between 2007 and 2017.

Women's doubles
Year	Tournament	Partner	Opponent	Score	Result
2013	Vietnam Open	(Malaysia) Soong Fie Cho	(South Korea) Go Ah-ra (South Korea) Yoo Hae-won	21–12, 10–21, 9–21	(silver) Runner-up
2015	Syed Modi International	(Malaysia) Soong Fie Cho	(Malaysia) Vivian Hoo (Malaysia) Woon Khe Wei	22–20, 21–15	(gold) Winner
2016	Scottish Open	(Malaysia) Teoh Mei Xing	(Malaysia) Lim Yin Loo (Malaysia) Yap Cheng Wen	17–21, 13–21	(silver) Runner-up

BWF Grand Prix Gold tournament
BWF Grand Prix tournament

=== BWF International Challenge/Series ===
Women's doubles
Year	Tournament	Partner	Opponent	Score	Result
2012	Vietnam International	(Malaysia) Soong Fie Cho	(Indonesia) Pia Zebadiah Bernadet (Indonesia) Rizki Amelia Pradipta	10–21, 15–21	(silver) Runner-up
2013	Iran Fajr International	(Malaysia) Soong Fie Cho	(Canada) Nicole Grether (Canada) Charmaine Reid	21–18, 21–15	(gold) Winner
2013	French International	(Malaysia) Soong Fie Cho	(Japan) Rie Eto (Japan) Yu Wakita	17–21, 17–21	(silver) Runner-up
2013	Malaysia International	(Malaysia) Soong Fie Cho	(Japan) Kugo Asumi (Japan) Yui Miyauchi	17–21, 14–21	(silver) Runner-up
2014	Iran Fajr International	(Malaysia) Soong Fie Cho	(Turkey) Özge Bayrak (Turkey) Neslihan Yiğit	21–11, 21–19	(gold) Winner
2016	Swiss International	(Malaysia) Teoh Mei Xing	(Netherlands) Cheryl Seinen (Netherlands) Iris Tabeling	21–13, 20–22, 10–21	(silver) Runner-up

Mixed doubles
Year	Tournament	Partner	Opponent	Score	Result
2010	Malaysia International	(Malaysia) Mohd Razif Abdul Latif	(Malaysia) Lim Khim Wah (Malaysia) Chong Sook Chin	28–30, 13–21	(silver) Runner-up
2011	Singapore International	(Malaysia) Mohd Razif Abdul Latif	(Singapore) Danny Bawa Chrisnanta (Singapore) Vanessa Neo	21–23, 14–21	(silver) Runner-up

BWF International Challenge tournament
BWF International Series tournament
