= Woon Khe Wei =

Malaysian badminton player

Woon Khe Wei 温可微
Personal information
- Born: Janice Woon Khe Wei; 18 March 1989 (age 37) Selangor, Malaysia
- Years active: 2007–2018
- Height: 1.72 m (5 ft 8 in)
- Weight: 60 kg (132 lb)

Sport
- Country: Malaysia
- Sport: Badminton
- Handedness: Left

Women's & mixed doubles
- Career record: WD: 161 wins, 161 losses XD: 54 wins, 56 losses
- Highest ranking: 9 (WD with Vivian Hoo 19 November 2015)
- BWF profile
Medal record
Women's badminton
Representing Malaysia
Sudirman Cup
Bronze medal – third place	2009 Guangzhou	Mixed team
Commonwealth Games
Gold medal – first place	2010 New Delhi	Mixed team
Gold medal – first place	2014 Glasgow	Mixed team
Gold medal – first place	2014 Glasgow	Women's doubles
Asian Games
Bronze medal – third place	2014 Incheon	Women's doubles
Asian Championships
Silver medal – second place	2010 New Delhi	Women's doubles
SEA Games
Gold medal – first place	2009 Vientiane	Women's team
Gold medal – first place	2013 Naypyidaw	Women's doubles
Silver medal – second place	2015 Singapore	Women's doubles
Silver medal – second place	2015 Singapore	Women's team
Silver medal – second place	2017 Kuala Lumpur	Women's team
Bronze medal – third place	2007 Nakhon Ratchasima	Women's team
Bronze medal – third place	2011 Jakarta–Palembang	Women's team
Bronze medal – third place	2017 Kuala Lumpur	Women's doubles
World Junior Championships
Bronze medal – third place	2006 Incheon	Mixed team
Commonwealth Youth Games
Gold medal – first place	2004 Bendigo	Mixed team
Asian Junior Championships
Gold medal – first place	2007 Kuala Lumpur	Mixed doubles
Gold medal – first place	2007 Kuala Lumpur	Mixed team
Silver medal – second place	2006 Kuala Lumpur	Mixed doubles
Silver medal – second place	2006 Kuala Lumpur	Mixed team

Janice Woon Khe Wei (born 18 March 1989) is a Malaysian former badminton player in the doubles event.

== Career ==
Her regular partner was Vivian Hoo. Together, they had ranked as high as No. 9 worldwide. They won the gold medal at the 2014 Commonwealth Games and they also reached the quarterfinals in the 2016 Olympics. She announced her retirement in December 2018, months after her last performance in the 2018 BWF World Championships.

== Achievements ==
=== Commonwealth Games ===
Women's doubles
Year	Venue	Partner	Opponent	Score	Result
2014	Emirates Arena, Glasgow, Scotland	(Malaysia) Vivian Hoo	(India) Jwala Gutta (India) Ashwini Ponnappa	21–17, 23–21	Gold

=== Asian Games ===
Women's doubles
Year	Venue	Partner	Opponent	Score	Result
2014	Gyeyang Gymnasium, Incheon, South Korea	(Malaysia) Vivian Hoo	(Japan) Misaki Matsutomo (Japan) Ayaka Takahashi	16–21, 17–21	Bronze

=== Asian Championships ===
Women's doubles
Year	Venue	Partner	Opponent	Score	Result
2010	Siri Fort Indoor Stadium, New Delhi, India	(Malaysia) Vivian Hoo	(China) Pan Pan (China) Tian Qing	10–21, 6–21	Silver

=== SEA Games ===
Women's doubles
Year	Venue	Partner	Opponent	Score	Result
2013	Wunna Theikdi Indoor Stadium; Naypyidaw, Myanmar	(Malaysia) Vivian Hoo	(Indonesia) Nitya Krishinda Maheswari (Indonesia) Greysia Polii	21–17, 18–21, 21–17	Gold
2015	Singapore Indoor Stadium, Singapore	(Malaysia) Vivian Hoo	(Malaysia) Amelia Alicia Anscelly (Malaysia) Soong Fie Cho	18–21, 13–21	Silver
2017	Axiata Arena; Kuala Lumpur, Malaysia	(Malaysia) Vivian Hoo	(Thailand) Jongkolphan Kititharakul (Thailand) Rawinda Prajongjai	21–17, 20–22, 17–21	Bronze

=== Asian Junior Championships ===
Mixed doubles
Year	Venue	Partner	Opponent	Score	Result
2006	Kuala Lumpur Badminton Stadium, Kuala Lumpur, Malaysia	(Malaysia) Tan Wee Kiong	(South Korea) Lee Yong-dae (South Korea) Yoo Hyun-young	15–21, 9–21	Silver
2007	Stadium Juara, Kuala Lumpur, Malaysia	(Malaysia) Tan Wee Kiong	(South Korea) Shin Baek-cheol (South Korea) Yoo Hyun-young	21–18, 16–21, 21–12	Gold

=== BWF Grand Prix ===
The BWF Grand Prix had two levels, the Grand Prix and Grand Prix Gold. It was a series of badminton tournaments sanctioned by the Badminton World Federation (BWF) and played between 2007 and 2017.

Women's doubles
Year	Tournament	Partner	Opponent	Score	Result
2011	Indonesia Grand Prix Gold	(Malaysia) Vivian Hoo	(China) Bao Yixin (China) Zhong Qianxin	19–21, 21–19, 21–18	(gold) Winner
2013	New Zealand Open	(Malaysia) Vivian Hoo	(China) Ou Dongni (China) Tang Yuanting	15–21, 21–11, 19–21	(silver) Runner-up
2015	Syed Modi International	(Malaysia) Vivian Hoo	(Malaysia) Amelia Alicia Anscelly (Malaysia) Soong Fie Cho	20–22, 15–21	(silver) Runner-up
2017	New Zealand Open	(Malaysia) Vivian Hoo	(Japan) Ayako Sakuramoto (Japan) Yukiko Takahata	18–21, 21–16, 21–19	(gold) Winner

BWF Grand Prix Gold tournament
BWF Grand Prix tournament

=== BWF International Challenge/Series ===
Women's doubles
Year	Tournament	Partner	Opponent	Score	Result
2009	Malaysia International	(Malaysia) Chong Sook Chin	(Japan) Rie Eto (Japan) Yu Wakita	18–21, 11–21	(silver) Runner-up

Mixed doubles
Year	Tournament	Partner	Opponent	Score	Result
2007	Malaysia International	(Malaysia) Tan Wee Kiong	(Malaysia) Lim Khim Wah (Malaysia) Ng Hui Lin	15–21, 14–21	(silver) Runner-up
2009	Malaysia International	(Malaysia) Tan Wee Kiong	(Malaysia) Mak Hee Chun (Malaysia) Ng Hui Lin	21–6, 13–21, 21–17	(gold) Winner
2012	Malaysia International	(Malaysia) Ong Jian Guo	(Indonesia) Lukhi Apri Nugroho (Indonesia) Annisa Saufika	21–11, 21–14	(gold) Winner

BWF International Challenge tournament
BWF International Series tournament
