= 2019 Korea Open (badminton) =

2019 badminton tournament in Incheon

Tournament details
- Dates: 24–29 September
- Level: Super 500
- Total prize money: US$400,000
- Venue: Incheon Airport Skydome
- Location: Incheon, South Korea

Champions
- Men's singles: (Japan) Kento Momota
- Women's singles: (China) He Bingjiao
- Men's doubles: (Indonesia) Fajar Alfian (Indonesia) Muhammad Rian Ardianto
- Women's doubles: (South Korea) Kim So-yeong (South Korea) Kong Hee-yong
- Mixed doubles: (Thailand) Dechapol Puavaranukroh (Thailand) Sapsiree Taerattanachai

The 2019 Korea Open was a badminton tournament which took place at Incheon Airport Skydome in Incheon, South Korea, from 24 to 29 September 2019 and had a total purse of $400,000.

== Tournament ==
The 2019 Korea Open was the nineteenth tournament of the 2019 BWF World Tour and also part of the Korea Open championships, which have been held since 1991. This tournament was organized by the Badminton Korea Association with sanction from the BWF.

=== Venue ===
This international tournament was held at Incheon Airport Skydome in Incheon, South Korea.

=== Point distribution ===
Below is the point distribution table for each phase of the tournament based on the BWF points system for the BWF World Tour Super 500 event.

Winner	Runner-up	3/4	5/8	9/16	17/32	33/64	65/128
9,200	7,800	6,420	5,040	3,600	2,220	880	430

=== Prize money ===
The total prize money for this tournament was US$400,000. Distribution of prize money was in accordance with BWF regulations.

Event	Winner	Finals	Semi-finals	Quarter-finals	Last 16
Singles	$30,000	$15,200	$5,800	$2,400	$1,400
Doubles	$31,600	$15,200	$5,600	$2,900	$1,500

== Men's singles ==
=== Seeds ===
1. (Japan) Kento Momota (champion)
2. (Chinese Taipei) Chou Tien-chen (final)
3. (China) Shi Yuqi (withdrew)
4. (Indonesia) Jonatan Christie (quarter-finals)
5. (Denmark) Anders Antonsen (second round)
6. (China) Chen Long (first round)
7. (Denmark) Viktor Axelsen (second round)
8. (Indonesia) Anthony Sinisuka Ginting (second round)

=== Finals ===
Semifinals
1	(Japan) Kento Momota	21	21
PFQ	(India) Parupalli Kashyap	13	15
(Chinese Taipei) Wang Tzu-wei	21	13	11
2	(Chinese Taipei) Chou Tien-chen	12	21	21

Final
1	(Japan) Kento Momota	21	21
2	(Chinese Taipei) Chou Tien-chen	19	17

=== Top half ===
==== Section 1 ====
First Round
1	(Japan) K Momota	21	21
Q1	(Thailand) K Vitidsarn	17	13
(Denmark) R Gemke	21	15	13
Q3	(South Korea) Kim D-h	11	21	21
7	(Denmark) V Axelsen	21	21
Q4	(China) Zhao JP	12	15
PFQ	(Thailand) S Avihingsanon	7	15
(Malaysia) Lee Z J	21	21

Second Round
1	(Japan) K Momota	21	21
Q3	(South Korea) Kim D-h	12	9
7	(Denmark) V Axelsen	18	16
(Malaysia) Lee Z J	21	21

Quarter-finals
1	(Japan) K Momota	21	21
(Malaysia) Lee Z J	15	19

==== Section 2 ====
First Round
PFQ	(Malaysia) Liew D	21	21
(China) Lin D	19	14
PFQ	(India) P Kashyap	21	21
Q2	(Chinese Taipei) Lu C-h	16	16
8	(Indonesia) A S Ginting	21	22
(Thailand) K Wangcharoen	16	20
(China) Huang YX	14	21	13
(Denmark) J Ø. Jørgensen	21	8	21

Second Round
PFQ	(Malaysia) Liew D	17	21	12
PFQ	(India) P Kashyap	21	11	21
8	(Indonesia) A S Ginting	21	16	13
(Denmark) J Ø. Jørgensen	17	21	21

Quarter-finals
PFQ	(India) P Kashyap	24	21
(Denmark) J Ø. Jørgensen	22	8

=== Bottom half ===
==== Section 3 ====
First Round
(Japan) K Tsuneyama	18	21	17
(Chinese Taipei) Wang T-w	21	15	21
(India) B. Sai Praneeth	9	7^{r}
5	(Denmark) A Antonsen	21	11
(Thailand) K Phetpradab	21	14	21
(Hong Kong) Lee C Y	18	21	19
(Denmark) H-K Vittinghus	16	20
4	(Indonesia) J Christie	21	22

Second Round
(Chinese Taipei) Wang T-w	21	21
5	(Denmark) A Antonsen	15	6
(Thailand) K Phetpradab	8	20
4	(Indonesia) J Christie	21	22

Quarter-finals
(Chinese Taipei) Wang T-w	21	15	21
4	(Indonesia) J Christie	10	21	13

==== Section 4 ====
First Round
PFQ	(Indonesia) S H Rhustavito	21	21
(Hong Kong) Wong W K	12	9
(China) Lu GZ	21	13	21
6	(China) Chen L	15	21	13
(Hong Kong) Ng K L	21	15	15
(Japan) K Nishimoto	17	21	21
(Thailand) S Thammasin	12	15
2	(Chinese Taipei) Chou T-c	21	21

Second Round
PFQ	(Indonesia) S H Rhustavito	21	21
(China) Lu GZ	15	13
(Japan) K Nishimoto	10	21	14
2	(Chinese Taipei) Chou T-c	21	16	21

Quarter-finals
PFQ	(Indonesia) S H Rhustavito	18	9
2	(Chinese Taipei) Chou T-c	21	21

== Women's singles ==
=== Seeds ===
1. (Japan) Akane Yamaguchi (first round)
2. (China) Chen Yufei (quarter-finals)
3. (Chinese Taipei) Tai Tzu-ying (semi-finals)
4. (Japan) Nozomi Okuhara (quarter-finals)
5. (India) P. V. Sindhu (first round)
6. (Thailand) Ratchanok Intanon (final)
7. (China) He Bingjiao (champion)
8. (India) Saina Nehwal (first round)

=== Finals ===
Semi-finals
6	(Thailand) Ratchanok Intanon	21	21
3	(Chinese Taipei) Tai Tzu-ying	19	11
(Canada) Michelle Li	9	15
7	(China) He Bingjiao	21	21

Final
6	(Thailand) Ratchanok Intanon	21	22	17
7	(China) He Bingjiao	18	24	21

=== Top half ===
==== Section 1 ====
First Round
1	(Japan) A Yamaguchi	11^{r}
(Indonesia) Fitriani	10
(China) Li XR	15	3^{r}
(Japan) S Takahashi	21	11
6	(Thailand) R Intanon	21	21
(Hong Kong) Cheung N Y	15	15
Q4	(South Korea) Jeon J-i	17	9
(Japan) A Ohori	21	21

Second Round
(Indonesia) Fitriani	16	7
(Japan) S Takahashi	21	21
6	(Thailand) R Intanon	21	21
(Japan) A Ohori	4	13

Quarter-finals
(Japan) S Takahashi	9	21
6	(Thailand) R Intanon	21	23

==== Section 2 ====
First Round
3	(Chinese Taipei) Tai T-y	21	21
(Thailand) B Ongbamrungphan	13	9
(China) Cai YY	21	21
(China) Chen XX	13	11
8	(India) S Nehwal	21	18	1^{r}
(South Korea) Kim G-e	19	21	8
(Indonesia) G M Tunjung	21	21
(Malaysia) S Cheah S Y	15	12

Second Round
3	(Chinese Taipei) Tai T-y	21	21
(China) Cai YY	11	11
(South Korea) Kim G-e	20	21	20
(Indonesia) G M Tunjung	22	15	22

Quarter-finals
3	(Chinese Taipei) Tai T-y	24	22
(Indonesia) G M Tunjung	22	20

=== Bottom half ===
==== Section 3 ====
First Round
(Canada) M Li	21	21
(Thailand) P Chochuwong	19	19
(United States) Zhang BW	7	24	21
5	(India) P. V. Sindhu	21	22	15
(South Korea) Sung J-h	21	21
(South Korea) An S-y	19	16
Q3	(South Korea) Sim Y-j	9	14
4	(Japan) N Okuhara	21	21

Second Round
(Canada) M Li	21	8	21
(United States) Zhang BW	15	21	10
(South Korea) Sung J-h	13	18
4	(Japan) N Okuhara	21	21

Quarter-finals
(Canada) M Li	21	21	21
4	(Japan) N Okuhara	23	16	19

==== Section 4 ====
First Round
Q1	(Chinese Taipei) Pai Y-p	16	18
(Thailand) N Jindapol	21	21
(China) Han Y	17	21	15
7	(China) He BJ	21	14	21
Q2	(South Korea) Kim H-m	21	21
(Denmark) L Kjærsfeldt	7	19
PFQ	(Russia) E Kosetskaya	13	18
2	(China) Chen YF	21	21

Second Round
(Thailand) N Jindapol	23	13	13
7	(China) He BJ	21	21	21
Q2	(South Korea) Kim H-m	13	11
2	(China) Chen YF	21	21

Quarter-finals
7	(China) He BJ	15	21	21
2	(China) Chen YF	21	17	18

== Men's doubles ==
=== Seeds ===
1. (Indonesia) Marcus Fernaldi Gideon / Kevin Sanjaya Sukamuljo (quarter-finals)
2. (Indonesia) Mohammad Ahsan / Hendra Setiawan (withdrew)
3. (China) Li Junhui / Liu Yuchen (semi-finals)
4. (Japan) Takeshi Kamura / Keigo Sonoda (final)
5. (Japan) Hiroyuki Endo / Yuta Watanabe (second round)
6. (Indonesia) Fajar Alfian / Muhammad Rian Ardianto (champions)
7. (China) Han Chengkai / Zhou Haodong (first round)
8. (Denmark) Kim Astrup / Anders Skaarup Rasmussen (second round)

=== Finals ===
Semi-finals
6	(Indonesia) Fajar Alfian (Indonesia) Muhammad Rian Ardianto	27	22
3	(China) Li Junhui (China) Liu Yuchen	25	20
4	(Japan) Takeshi Kamura (Japan) Keigo Sonoda	21	21
(South Korea) Choi Sol-gyu (South Korea) Seo Seung-jae	13	14

Final
6	(Indonesia) Fajar Alfian (Indonesia) Muhammad Rian Ardianto	21	21
4	(Japan) Takeshi Kamura (Japan) Keigo Sonoda	16	17

=== Top half ===
==== Section 1 ====
First Round
1	(Indonesia) M F Gideon (Indonesia) K S Sukamuljo	22	21	21
(Malaysia) A Chia (Malaysia) Soh W Y	24	10	13
(Malaysia) Ong Y S (Malaysia) Teo E Y	21	13	16
(Malaysia) Goh V S (Malaysia) Tan W K	16	21	21
6	(Indonesia) F Alfian (Indonesia) M R Ardianto	21	20	21
Q3	(China) Ou XY (China) Zhang N	15	22	16
(South Korea) Ko S-h (South Korea) Shin B-c	16	18
(Chinese Taipei) Lee Y (Chinese Taipei) Wang C-l	21	21

Second Round
1	(Indonesia) M F Gideon (Indonesia) K S Sukamuljo	21	22
(Malaysia) Goh V S (Malaysia) Tan W K	9	20
6	(Indonesia) F Alfian (Indonesia) M R Ardianto	21	21
(Chinese Taipei) Lee Y (Chinese Taipei) Wang C-l	18	18

Quarter-finals
1	(Indonesia) M F Gideon (Indonesia) K S Sukamuljo	20	17
6	(Indonesia) F Alfian (Indonesia) M R Ardianto	22	21

==== Section 2 ====
First Round
3	(China) Li JH (China) Liu YC	21	21
PFQ	(Malaysia) M Arif A L (Malaysia) N M Azriyn A	11	13
Q1	(South Korea) Kang M-h (South Korea) Kim J-h	21	21
(Netherlands) J Maas (Netherlands) R Tabeling	16	9
5	(Japan) H Endo (Japan) Y Watanabe	21	17	21
(Japan) T Inoue (Japan) Y Kaneko	11	21	13
(India) M Attri (India) B. S Reddy	16	21	18
Q4	(China) Huang KX (China) Liu C	21	19	21

Second Round
3	(China) Li JH (China) Liu YC	21	16	21
Q1	(South Korea) Kang M-h (South Korea) Kim J-h	13	21	15
5	(Japan) H Endo (Japan) Y Watanabe	13	19
Q4	(China) Huang KX (China) Liu C	21	21

Quarter-finals
3	(China) Li JH (China) Liu YC	21	17	22
Q4	(China) Huang KX (China) Liu C	14	21	20

=== Bottom half ===
==== Section 3 ====
First Round
Q2	(Chinese Taipei) Lee J-h (Chinese Taipei) Yang P-hs	20	22	18
(Indonesia) W Nayaka (Indonesia) A Yusuf	22	20	21
(Denmark) M Boe (Denmark) M Conrad-Petersen	21	21
7	(China) Han CK (China) Zhou HD	12	9
(Chinese Taipei) Liao M-c (Chinese Taipei) Su C-h	9	21	19
(China) He JT (China) Tan Q	21	19	21
(India) S Rankireddy (India) C Shetty	19	21	18
4	(Japan) T Kamura (Japan) K Sonoda	21	18	21

Second Round
(Indonesia) W Nayaka (Indonesia) A Yusuf	22	14	10
(Denmark) M Boe (Denmark) M Conrad-Petersen	20	21	21
(China) He JT (China) Tan Q	19	12
4	(Japan) T Kamura (Japan) K Sonoda	21	21

Quarter-finals
(Denmark) M Boe (Denmark) M Conrad-Petersen	13	17
4	(Japan) T Kamura (Japan) K Sonoda	21	21

==== Section 4 ====
First Round
(South Korea) Kim G-j (South Korea) Lee Y-d	21	10	19
(South Korea) Choi S-g (South Korea) Seo S-j	19	21	21
(Japan) T Hoki (Japan) Y Kobayashi	15	18
8	(Denmark) K Astrup (Denmark) A S Rasmussen	21	21
(Russia) V Ivanov (Russia) I Sozonov	13	12
(Malaysia) Goh S F (Malaysia) N Izzuddin M R	21	21
(Chinese Taipei) Lu C-y (Chinese Taipei) Yang P-h	13	19
PFQ	(Malaysia) Chooi K M (Malaysia) Low J S	21	21

Second Round
(South Korea) Choi S-g (South Korea) Seo S-j	21	21
8	(Denmark) K Astrup (Denmark) A S Rasmussen	17	13
(Malaysia) Goh S F (Malaysia) N Izzuddin M R	19	21	21
PFQ	(Malaysia) Chooi K M (Malaysia) Low J S	21	18	15

Quarter-finals
(South Korea) Choi S-g (South Korea) Seo S-j	21	18	21
(Malaysia) Goh S F (Malaysia) N Izzuddin M R	18	21	18

== Women's doubles ==
=== Seeds ===
1. (Japan) Mayu Matsumoto / Wakana Nagahara (second round)
2. (Japan) Misaki Matsutomo / Ayaka Takahashi (quarter-finals)
3. (Japan) Yuki Fukushima / Sayaka Hirota (second round)
4. (China) Chen Qingchen / Jia Yifan (quarter-finals)
5. (Indonesia) Greysia Polii / Apriyani Rahayu (second round)
6. (South Korea) Lee So-hee / Shin Seung-chan (final)
7. (China) Du Yue / Li Yinhui (quarter-finals)
8. (South Korea) Kim So-yeong / Kong Hee-yong (champions)

=== Finals ===
Semi-finals
(Japan) Ayako Sakuramoto (Japan) Yukiko Takahata	13	21	5
8	(South Korea) Kim So-yeong (South Korea) Kong Hee-yong	21	13	21
(Japan) Nami Matsuyama (Japan) Chiharu Shida	21	19	15
6	(South Korea) Lee So-hee (South Korea) Shin Seung-chan	15	21	21

Final
8	(South Korea) Kim So-yeong (South Korea) Kong Hee-yong	13	21	21
6	(South Korea) Lee So-hee (South Korea) Shin Seung-chan	21	19	17

=== Top half ===
==== Section 1 ====
First Round
1	(Japan) M Matsumoto (Japan) W Nagahara	21	21
(Thailand) C Chaladchalam (Thailand) P Muenwong	12	10
(China) Dong WJ (China) Feng XY	15	16
(South Korea) Chang Y-n (South Korea) Kim H-r	21	21
5	(Indonesia) G Polii (Indonesia) A Rahayu	21	21
(Chinese Taipei) Hsu y-c (Chinese Taipei) Hu L-f	13	15
Q3	(Canada) C Choi (Canada) J Wu	13	8
(Japan) A Sakuramoto (Japan) Y Takahata	21	21

Second Round
1	(Japan) M Matsumoto (Japan) W Nagahara	16	21	14
(South Korea) Chang Y-n (South Korea) Kim H-r	21	17	21
5	(Indonesia) G Polii (Indonesia) A Rahayu	19	17
(Japan) A Sakuramoto (Japan) Y Takahata	21	21

Quarter-finals
(South Korea) Chang Y-n (South Korea) Kim H-r	20	19
(Japan) A Sakuramoto (Japan) Y Takahata	22	21

==== Section 2 ====
First Round
4	(China) Chen QC (China) Jia YF	21	21
Q4	(Chinese Taipei) Chang C-h (Chinese Taipei) Yang C-t	7	9
(Canada) R Honderich (Canada) K Tsai	21	21
(Netherlands) S Piek (Netherlands) C Seinen	14	17
8	(South Korea) Kim S-y (South Korea) Kong H-y	21	21
(Malaysia) V Hoo K M (Malaysia) Yap C W	11	18
(Bulgaria) G Stoeva (Bulgaria) S Stoeva	21	21
PFQ	(Hong Kong) Ng W Y (Hong Kong) Yeung N T	18	9

Second Round
4	(China) Chen QC (China) Jia YF	21	20	21
(Canada) R Honderich (Canada) K Tsai	13	22	6
8	(South Korea) Kim S-y (South Korea) Kong H-y	21	18	21
(Bulgaria) G Stoeva (Bulgaria) S Stoeva	7	21	13

Quarter-finals
4	(China) Chen QC (China) Jia YF	18	16
8	(South Korea) Kim S-y (South Korea) Kong H-y	21	21

=== Bottom half ===
==== Section 3 ====
First Round
(China) Li WM (China) Zheng Y	21	21
(Malaysia) Chow M K (Malaysia) Lee M Y	14	16
(France) D Delrue (France) L Palermo	12	23	10
7	(China) Du Y (China) Li YH	21	21	21
(Russia) E Bolotova (Russia) A Davletova	17	17
(Japan) N Matsuyama (Japan) C Shida	21	21
Q1	(South Korea) Jeong N-e (South Korea) Kim M-j	6	0^{r}
3	(Japan) Y Fukushima (Japan) S Hirota	21	0

Second Round
(China) Li WM (China) Zheng Y	17	22	14
7	(China) Du Y (China) Li YH	21	20	21
(Japan) N Matsuyama (Japan) C Shida	21	22
3	(Japan) Y Fukushima (Japan) S Hirota	18	20

Quarter-finals
7	(China) Du Y (China) Li YH	19	21	13
(Japan) N Matsuyama (Japan) C Shida	21	16	21

==== Section 4 ====
First Round
(Denmark) M Fruergaard (Denmark) S Thygesen	17	12
(Thailand) J Kititharakul (Thailand) R Prajongjai	21	21
(South Korea) Baek H-n (South Korea) Jung K-e	19	20
6	(South Korea) Lee S-h (South Korea) Shin S-c	21	22
(China) Liu XX (China) Xia YT	21	14	16
(Thailand) P Supajirakul (Thailand) S Taerattanachai	15	21	21
Q2	(Hong Kong) Ng T Y (Hong Kong) Yuen S Y	9	15
2	(Japan) M Matsutomo (Japan) A Takahashi	21	21

Second Round
(Thailand) J Kititharakul (Thailand) R Prajongjai	9	21	10
6	(South Korea) Lee S-h (South Korea) Shin S-c	21	18	21
(Thailand) P Supajirakul (Thailand) S Taerattanachai	10	18
2	(Japan) M Matsutomo (Japan) A Takahashi	21	21

Quarter-finals
6	(South Korea) Lee S-h (South Korea) Shin S-c	16	21	21
2	(Japan) M Matsutomo (Japan) A Takahashi	21	19	18

== Mixed doubles ==
=== Seeds ===
1. (China) Zheng Siwei / Huang Yaqiong (final)
2. (China) Wang Yilü / Huang Dongping (first round)
3. (Japan) Yuta Watanabe / Arisa Higashino (quarter-finals)
4. (Thailand) Dechapol Puavaranukroh / Sapsiree Taerattanachai (champions)
5. (Malaysia) Chan Peng Soon / Goh Liu Ying (first round)
6. (South Korea) Seo Seung-jae / Chae Yoo-jung (semi-finals)
7. (Indonesia) Praveen Jordan / Melati Daeva Oktavianti (quarter-finals)
8. (Hong Kong) Tang Chun Man / Tse Ying Suet (first round)

=== Finals ===
Semi-finals
1	(China) Zheng Siwei (China) Huang Yaqiong	21	21
6	(South Korea) Seo Seung-jae (South Korea) Chae Yoo-jung	11	16
4	(Thailand) Dechapol Puavaranukroh (Thailand) Sapsiree Taerattanachai	20	21	21
(Indonesia) Rinov Rivaldy (Indonesia) Pitha Haningtyas Mentari	22	11	18

Final
1	(China) Zheng Siwei (China) Huang Yaqiong	14	13
4	(Thailand) Dechapol Puavaranukroh (Thailand) Sapsiree Taerattanachai	21	21

=== Top half ===
==== Section 1 ====
First Round
1	(China) Zheng SW (China) Huang YQ	21	21
(Indonesia) T Ahmad (Indonesia) W O Kandow	19	11
(France) T Gicquel (France) D Delrue	11	12
(England) C Adcock (England) G Adcock	21	21
7	(Indonesia) P Jordan (Indonesia) M D Oktavianti	24	23
(England) M Ellis (England) L Smith	22	21
Q2	(Denmark) N Nøhr (Denmark) S Thygesen	15	17
(Indonesia) H Faizal (Indonesia) G E Widjaja	21	21

Second Round
1	(China) Zheng SW (China) Huang YQ	21	21
(England) C Adcock (England) G Adcock	8	10
7	(Indonesia) P Jordan (Indonesia) M D Oktavianti	21	21
(Indonesia) H Faizal (Indonesia) G E Widjaja	13	14

Quarter-finals
1	(China) Zheng SW (China) Huang YQ	21	21
7	(Indonesia) P Jordan (Indonesia) M D Oktavianti	10	18

==== Section 2 ====
First Round
3	(Japan) Y Watanabe (Japan) A Higashino	21	21
PFQ	(Hong Kong) Chang T C (Hong Kong) Ng W Y	14	12
(Malaysia) Tan K M (Malaysia) Lai P J	21	19	13
(China) Lu K (China) Chen L	11	21	21
6	(South Korea) Seo S-j (South Korea) Chae Y-j	20	21	21
Q1	(South Korea) Choi S-g (South Korea) Shin S-c	22	14	13
(Russia) R Alimov (Russia) A Davletova	21	21
PFQ	(Canada) J Hurlburt-Yu (Canada) J Wu	16	17

Second Round
3	(Japan) Y Watanabe (Japan) A Higashino	21	21
(China) Lu K (China) Chen L	7	9
6	(South Korea) Seo S-j (South Korea) Chae Y-j	21	21
(Russia) R Alimov (Russia) A Davletova	16	12

Quarter-finals
3	(Japan) Y Watanabe (Japan) A Higashino	14	16
6	(South Korea) Seo S-j (South Korea) Chae Y-j	21	21

=== Bottom half ===
==== Section 3 ====
First Round
(Japan) T Hoki (Japan) W Nagahara	14	12
(Japan) Y Kaneko (Japan) M Matsutomo	21	21
(Thailand) N Phuangphuapet (Thailand) S Amitrapai	21	21
5	(Malaysia) Chan P S (Malaysia) Goh L Y	12	10
(Republic of Ireland) S Magee (Republic of Ireland) C Magee	21	21
(China) Ou XY (China) Feng XY	18	18
Q4	(South Korea) Kang M-h (South Korea) Kim H-j	20	14
4	(Thailand) D Puavaranukroh (Thailand) S Taerattanachai	22	21

Second Round
(Japan) Y Kaneko (Japan) M Matsutomo	21	21
(Thailand) N Phuangphuapet (Thailand) S Amitrapai	17	12
(Republic of Ireland) S Magee (Republic of Ireland) C Magee	8	22	10
4	(Thailand) D Puavaranukroh (Thailand) S Taerattanachai	21	20	21

Quarter-finals
(Japan) Y Kaneko (Japan) M Matsutomo	15	12
4	(Thailand) D Puavaranukroh (Thailand) S Taerattanachai	21	21

==== Section 4 ====
First Round
(Netherlands) R Tabeling (Netherlands) S Piek	21	21
(Japan) K Gondo (Japan) A Kurihara	13	14
(China) He JT (China) Du Y	21	22
8	(Hong Kong) Tang C M (Hong Kong) Tse Y S	12	20
(Indonesia) R Rivaldy (Indonesia) P H Mentari	21	18	21
(South Korea) Ko S-h (South Korea) Eom H-w	18	21	18
Q3	(Chinese Taipei) Wang C-l (Chinese Taipei) Cheng C-y	3
2	(China) Wang YL (China) Huang DP	1^{r}

Second Round
(Netherlands) R Tabeling (Netherlands) S Piek	17	12
(China) He JT (China) Du Y	21	21
(Indonesia) R Rivaldy (Indonesia) P H Mentari	20	21	21
Q3	(Chinese Taipei) Wang C-l (Chinese Taipei) Cheng C-y	22	16	18

Quarter-finals
(China) He JT (China) Du Y	24	24	20
(Indonesia) R Rivaldy (Indonesia) P H Mentari	26	22	22

Preceded by 2019 China Open	BWF World Tour; 2019 BWF season	Succeeded by 2019 Indonesia Masters Super 100
