= 2017 Denmark Super Series Premier =

Tournament details
- Dates: 17 – 22 October 2017
- Level: Super Series Premier
- Total prize money: US$750,000
- Venue: Odense Sports Park
- Location: Odense, Denmark

Champions
- Men's singles: (India) Srikanth Kidambi
- Women's singles: (Thailand) Ratchanok Intanon
- Men's doubles: (China) Liu Cheng (China) Zhang Nan
- Women's doubles: (South Korea) Lee So-hee (South Korea) Shin Seung-chan
- Mixed doubles: (Hong Kong) Tang Chun Man (Hong Kong) Tse Ying Suet

The 2017 Denmark Super Series Premier is the ninth Super Series tournament of the 2017 BWF Super Series. The tournament took place at Odense Sports Park in Odense, Denmark from October 17 – 22, 2017 and had a total prize of $750,000.

== Men's singles ==
=== Seeds ===
1. (South Korea) Son Wan-ho (semifinals)
2. (Denmark) Viktor Axelsen (quarterfinals)
3. (China) Lin Dan (withdrew)
4. (China) Shi Yuqi (first round)
5. (Chinese Taipei) Chou Tien-chen (quarterfinals)
6. (China) Chen Long (first round)
7. (Malaysia) Lee Chong Wei (second round)
8. (India) Srikanth Kidambi (champion)

=== Top half ===
First round
1	(South Korea) Son W-h	21	21	21
(Indonesia) A S Ginting	23	17	17
(Denmark) A Antonsen	21	21
Q3	(Japan) K Nishimoto	11	16
7	(Malaysia) Lee C W	21	21
(Spain) P Abián	12	16
(India) H. S. Prannoy	21	21
(Denmark) E Holst	18	19
4	(China) Shi YQ	19	13
(England) R Ouseph	21	21
(Indonesia) J Christie	21	21
(Hong Kong) Hu Y	8	11
6	(China) Chen L	19	20
(South Korea) Lee H-i	21	22
(Thailand) T Saensomboonsuk	21	15	21
(Hong Kong) Ng K L	18	21	16

Second round
1	(South Korea) Son W-h	20	21	21
(Denmark) A Antonsen	22	14	18
7	(Malaysia) Lee C W	17	21	19
(India) H. S. Prannoy	21	11	21
(England) R Ouseph	15	21	21
(Indonesia) J Christie	21	17	18
(South Korea) Lee H-i	15	21	21
(Thailand) T Saensomboonsuk	21	19	14

Quarterfinals
1	(South Korea) Son W-h	21	21
(India) H. S. Prannoy	13	18
(England) R Ouseph	22	6
(South Korea) Lee H-i	24	21

Semifinals
1	(South Korea) Son W-h	23	21	17
(South Korea) Lee H-i	25	18	21

=== Bottom half ===
First round
(India) B. S Praneeth	10	15
(Denmark) H-K Vittinghus	21	21
(China) Tian HW	20	14
5	(Chinese Taipei) Chou T-c	22	21
(Germany) F Roth	21	10	13
(Hong Kong) Wong W K	17	21	21
PFQ	(Brazil) Y Coelho	18	16
PFQ	(Japan) K Sakai	21	21
(South Korea) Jeon H-j	21	21
(France) B Leverdez	13	14
Q4	(India) S Dey	17	15
8	(India) S Kidambi	21	21
PFQ	(Hong Kong) Wei N	27	21
Q1	(Finland) K Koljonen	25	18
Q2	(Japan) T Ueda	8	11
2	(Denmark) V Axelsen	21	21

Second round
(Denmark) H-K Vittinghus	15	21	11
5	(Chinese Taipei) Chou T-c	21	18	21
(Hong Kong) Wong W K	21	21
PFQ	(Japan) K Sakai	15	7
(South Korea) Jeon H-j	13	21	18
8	(India) S Kidambi	21	8	21
PFQ	(Hong Kong) Wei N	21	10	21
2	(Denmark) V Axelsen	17	21	23

Quarterfinals
5	(Chinese Taipei) Chou T-c	20	22
(Hong Kong) Wong W K	22	24
8	(India) S Kidambi	14	22	21
2	(Denmark) V Axelsen	21	20	7

Semifinals
(Hong Kong) Wong W K	18	17
8	(India) S Kidambi	21	21

=== Finals ===
Semifinals
1	(South Korea) Son Wan-ho	23	21	17
(South Korea) Lee Hyun-il	25	18	21
(Hong Kong) Wong Wing Ki	18	17
8	(India) Srikanth Kidambi	21	21

Final
(South Korea) Lee Hyun-il	10	5
8	(India) Srikanth Kidambi	21	21

== Women's singles ==
=== Seeds ===
1. (Chinese Taipei) Tai Tzu-ying (semifinals)
2. (India) P. V. Sindhu (first round)
3. (South Korea) Sung Ji-hyun (quarterfinals)
4. (Japan) Akane Yamaguchi (final)
5. (Spain) Carolina Marín (first round)
6. (China) Sun Yu (withdrew)
7. (China) He Bingjiao (second round)
8. (Japan) Nozomi Okuhara (withdrew)

=== Top half ===
First round
1	(Chinese Taipei) Tai T-y	21	21
(Hong Kong) Cheung N Y	18	13
(Denmark) L Kjaersfeldt	15	13
(Thailand) B Ongbumrungpan	21	21
PFQ	(South Korea) Kim H-m	21	21
(Denmark) M Blichfeldt	11	15
(Switzerland) S Jaquet	0^{r}
(Thailand) P Chochuwong	2
3	(South Korea) Sung J-h	17	21	21
(Denmark) N K Rohde	21	10	8
Q1	(Denmark) J D Jakobsen	w	/	o
Q3	(Denmark) A T Madsen
PFQ	(Canada) M Li	21	21
Q4	(England) C Birch	18	8
(Scotland) K Gilmour	17	13
(Thailand) R Intanon	21	21

Second round
1	(Chinese Taipei) Tai T-y	12	21	21
(Thailand) B Ongbumrungpan	21	18	8
PFQ	(South Korea) Kim H-m	21	24
(Thailand) P Chochuwong	10	22
3	(South Korea) Sung J-h	21	21
Q1	(Denmark) J D Jakobsen	6	13
PFQ	(Canada) M Li	11	16
(Thailand) R Intanon	21	21

Quarterfinals
1	(Chinese Taipei) Tai T-y	20	21	21
PFQ	(South Korea) Kim H-m	22	16	9
3	(South Korea) Sung J-h	13	18
(Thailand) R Intanon	21	21

Semifinals
1	(Chinese Taipei) Tai T-y	14	22	14
(Thailand) R Intanon	21	20	21

=== Bottom half ===
First round
(Thailand) N Jindapol	21	21
(Russia) E Kosetskaya	16	11
(India) S Nehwal	22	21
5	(Spain) C Marín	20	18
(United States) B Zhang	12	21	21
(Japan) M Mitani	21	16	17
(Hong Kong) Yip P Y	15	17
4	(Japan) A Yamaguchi	21	21
(Japan) S Sato	21	19	21
(South Korea) Lee J-m	15	21	18
(Denmark) M Poulsen	21	11	9
7	(China) He BJ	14	21	21
(Bulgaria) L Zetchiri	21	21
Q2	(Germany) F Deprez	19	12
(China) Chen YF	21	23
2	(India) P. V. Sindhu	17	21

Second round
(Thailand) N Jindapol	20	13
(India) S Nehwal	22	21
(United States) B Zhang	23	15	14
4	(Japan) A Yamaguchi	21	21	21
(Japan) S Sato	21	22
7	(China) He BJ	17	20
(Bulgaria) L Zetchiri	6	14
(China) Chen YF	21	21

Quarterfinals
(India) S Nehwal	10	13
4	(Japan) A Yamaguchi	21	21
(Japan) S Sato	6	14
(China) Chen YF	21	21

Semifinals
4	(Japan) A Yamaguchi	10	21	21
(China) Chen YF	21	18	19

=== Finals ===
Semifinals
1	(Chinese Taipei) Tai Tzu-ying	14	22	14
(Thailand) Ratchanok Intanon	21	20	21
4	(Japan) Akane Yamaguchi	10	21	21
(China) Chen Yufei	21	18	19

Final
(Thailand) Ratchanok Intanon	14	21	21
4	(Japan) Akane Yamaguchi	21	15	19

== Men's doubles ==
=== Seeds ===
1. (Denmark) Mathias Boe / Carsten Mogensen (semifinals)
2. (Indonesia) Marcus Fernaldi Gideon / Kevin Sanjaya Sukamuljo (final)
3. (China) Li Junhui / Liu Yuchen (quarterfinals)
4. (Japan) Takeshi Kamura / Keigo Sonoda (quarterfinals)
5. (China) Liu Cheng / Zhang Nan (champion)
6. (Denmark) Mads Conrad-Petersen / Mads Pieler Kolding (second round)
7. (Chinese Taipei) Lee Jhe-huei / Lee Yang (second round)
8. (Indonesia) Ricky Karanda Suwardi / Angga Pratama (semifinals)

=== Top half ===
First round
1	(Denmark) M Boe (Denmark) C Mogensen	21	21
Q2	(Netherlands) J Maas (Netherlands) R Tabeling	18	16
Q1	(Denmark) J Bay (Denmark) R Kjær	12	15
(Hong Kong) Or C C (Hong Kong) Tang C M	21	21
6	(Denmark) M Conrad-Petersen (Denmark) M P Kolding	21	21
(India) M Attri (India) B. S Reddy	13	18
Q3	(Denmark) K Antonsen (Denmark) N Nohr	19	21	21
PFQ	(Denmark) F Colberg (Denmark) R Fladberg	21	12	9
4	(Japan) T Kamura (Japan) K Sonoda	21	21
Q4	(England) B Lane (England) S Vendy	8	18
(Denmark) K Astrup (Denmark) A S Rasmussen	21	23
(Indonesia) B Angriawan (Indonesia) Hardianto	8	21
5	(China) Liu C (China) Zhang N	21	21
(Chinese Taipei) Lu C-y (Chinese Taipei) Yang P-h	12	16
(Indonesia) H Setiawan (Malaysia) Tan B H	21	15	21
(Thailand) K Kedren (Thailand) D Puavaranukroh	19	21	16

Second round
1	(Denmark) M Boe (Denmark) C Mogensen	21	21	21
(Hong Kong) Or C C (Hong Kong) Tang C M	23	8	19
6	(Denmark) M Conrad-Petersen (Denmark) M P Kolding	19	13
Q3	(Denmark) K Antonsen (Denmark) N Nohr	21	21
4	(Japan) T Kamura (Japan) K Sonoda	23	21
(Denmark) K Astrup (Denmark) A S Rasmussen	21	18
5	(China) Liu C (China) Zhang N	15	21	21
(Indonesia) H Setiawan (Malaysia) Tan B H	21	18	15

Quarterfinals
1	(Denmark) M Boe (Denmark) C Mogensen	21	21
Q3	(Denmark) K Antonsen (Denmark) N Nohr	16	17
4	(Japan) T Kamura (Japan) K Sonoda	10	18
5	(China) Liu C (China) Zhang N	21	21

Semifinals
1	(Denmark) M Boe (Denmark) C Mogensen	18	21	13
5	(China) Liu C (China) Zhang N	21	18	21

=== Bottom half ===
First round
(Chinese Taipei) Chen H-l (Chinese Taipei) Wang C-l	21	21
(England) P Briggs (England) T Wolfenden	17	13
(China) He JT (China) Tan Q	14	18
8	(Indonesia) R K Suwardi (Indonesia) A Pratama	21	21
PFQ	(South Korea) Chung E-s (South Korea) Kim D-y	14	21	21
(India) S Rankireddy (India) C Shetty	21	18	17
(Indonesia) M Ahsan (Indonesia) R A Saputro	23	18
3	(China) Li JH (China) Liu YC	25	21
(Russia) V Ivanov (Russia) I Sozonov	17	16
(China) Huang KX (China) Wang YL	21	21
(Germany) J R Jansen (Germany) J Zurwonne	19	19
7	(Chinese Taipei) Lee J-h (Chinese Taipei) Lee Y	21	21
(Denmark) M Christiansen (Denmark) D Daugaard	21	21
(Germany) M Lamsfuss (Germany) M E Seidel	13	19
(Japan) T Hoki (Japan) Y Kobayashi	16	21	10
2	(Indonesia) M F Gideon (Indonesia) K S Sukamuljo	21	19	21

Second round
(Chinese Taipei) Chen H-l (Chinese Taipei) Wang C-l	19	19
8	(Indonesia) R K Suwardi (Indonesia) A Pratama	21	21
PFQ	(South Korea) Chung E-s (South Korea) Kim D-y	19	21	17
3	(China) Li JH (China) Liu YC	21	17	21
(China) Huang KX (China) Wang YL	21	21
7	(Chinese Taipei) Lee J-h (Chinese Taipei) Lee Y	16	18
(Denmark) M Christiansen (Denmark) D Daugaard	14	16
2	(Indonesia) M F Gideon (Indonesia) K S Sukamuljo	21	21

Quarterfinals
8	(Indonesia) R K Suwardi (Indonesia) A Pratama	21	21
3	(China) Li JH (China) Liu YC	18	9
(China) Huang KX (China) Wang YL	16	13
2	(Indonesia) M F Gideon (Indonesia) K S Sukamuljo	21	21

Semifinals
8	(Indonesia) R K Suwardi (Indonesia) A Pratama	18	11
2	(Indonesia) M F Gideon (Indonesia) K S Sukamuljo	21	21

=== Finals ===
Semifinals
1	(Denmark) Mathias Boe (Denmark) Carsten Mogensen	18	21	13
5	(China) Liu Cheng (China) Zhang Nan	21	18	21
8	(Indonesia) Ricky Karanda Suwardi (Indonesia) Angga Pratama	18	11
2	(Indonesia) Marcus Fernaldi Gideon (Indonesia) Kevin Sanjaya Sukamuljo	21	21

Final
5	(China) Liu Cheng (China) Zhang Nan	21	22	21
2	(Indonesia) Marcus Fernaldi Gideon (Indonesia) Kevin Sanjaya Sukamuljo	16	24	19

== Women's doubles ==
=== Seeds ===
1. (Japan) Misaki Matsutomo / Ayaka Takahashi (second round)
2. (China) Chen Qingchen / Jia Yifan (second round)
3. (Denmark) Kamilla Rytter Juhl / Christinna Pedersen (quarterfinals)
4. (Japan) Yuki Fukushima / Sayaka Hirota (second round)
5. (China) Huang Dongping / Li Yinhui (second round)
6. (Japan) Shiho Tanaka / Koharu Yonemoto (final)
7. (South Korea) Chang Ye-na / Jung Kyung-eun (semifinals)
8. (Japan) Naoko Fukuman / Kurumi Yonao (semifinals)

=== Top half ===
First round
1	(Japan) M Matsutomo (Japan) A Takahashi	3
(Denmark) J Finne-Ipsen (Denmark) R Søby	2^{r}
Q2	(Sweden) E Karlsson (Sweden) J Magnusson	14	17
(South Korea) Chae Y-j (South Korea) Kim H-r	21	21
7	(South Korea) Chang Y-n (South Korea) Jung K-e	21	21
(Germany) J Goliszewski (Germany) L Käpplein	13	8
(China) Du Y (China) Xu Y	21	17	24
(Hong Kong) Poon L Y (Hong Kong) Tse Y S	14	21	22
4	(Japan) Y Fukushima (Japan) S Hirota	21	21
(Chinese Taipei) Hsu Y-c (Chinese Taipei) Wu T-j	14	13
Q3	(China) Huang YQ (China) Yu XH	21	21
(France) É Lefel (France) A Tran	12	16
5	(China) Huang DP (China) Li YH	21	21
(Malaysia) Vivian H K M (Malaysia) Woon K W	17	14
(South Korea) Lee S-h (South Korea) Shin S-c	21	21
(Denmark) M Fruergaard (Denmark) S Thygesen	15	10

Second round
1	(Japan) M Matsutomo (Japan) A Takahashi	17	19
(South Korea) Chae Y-j (South Korea) Kim H-r	21	21
7	(South Korea) Chang Y-n (South Korea) Jung K-e	21	21
(China) Du Y (China) Xu Y	13	13
4	(Japan) Y Fukushima (Japan) S Hirota	13	21	20
Q3	(China) Huang YQ (China) Yu XH	21	10	22
5	(China) Huang DP (China) Li YH	9	16
(South Korea) Lee S-h (South Korea) Shin S-c	21	21

Quarterfinals
(South Korea) Chae Y-j (South Korea) Kim H-r	15	16
7	(South Korea) Chang Y-n (South Korea) Jung K-e	21	21
Q3	(China) Huang YQ (China) Yu XH	17	10
(South Korea) Lee S-h (South Korea) Shin S-c	21	21

Semifinals
7	(South Korea) Chang Y-n (South Korea) Jung K-e	9	20
(South Korea) Lee S-h (South Korea) Shin S-c	21	22

=== Bottom half ===
First round
(India) A Ponnappa (India) N. S Reddy	21	18	21
(Malaysia) Chow M K (Malaysia) Lee M Y	15	21	23
(Indonesia) A S Awanda (Indonesia) N K M Istirani	13	12
8	(Japan) N Fukuman (Japan) K Yonao	21	21
(Bulgaria) G Stoeva (Bulgaria) S Stoeva	21	21
(Germany) I Herttrich (Germany) C Nelte	15	19
Q1	(England) C Birch (England) J Pugh	11	16
3	(Denmark) K Rytter Juhl (Denmark) C Pedersen	21	21
(Russia) A Chervyakova (Russia) O Morozova	12	8
(Thailand) J Kititharakul (Thailand) R Prajongjai	21	21
(Indonesia) G Polii (Indonesia) A Rahayu	14	21	20
6	(Japan) S Tanaka (Japan) K Yonemoto	21	18	22
Q4	(Sweden) A Hogstrom (Sweden) C Nistad	10	7
(Indonesia) D D Haris (Indonesia) R A Pradipta	21	21
(England) L Smith (England) S Walker	12	10
2	(China) Chen QC (China) Jia YF	21	21

Second round
(Malaysia) Chow M K (Malaysia) Lee M Y	18	17
8	(Japan) N Fukuman (Japan) K Yonao	21	21
(Bulgaria) G Stoeva (Bulgaria) S Stoeva	18	21	21
3	(Denmark) K Rytter Juhl (Denmark) C Pedersen	21	14	23
(Thailand) J Kititharakul (Thailand) R Prajongjai	17	11
6	(Japan) S Tanaka (Japan) K Yonemoto	21	21
(Indonesia) D D Haris (Indonesia) R A Pradipta	21	21	21
2	(China) Chen QC (China) Jia YF	23	18	10

Quarterfinals
8	(Japan) N Fukuman (Japan) K Yonao	w	/	o
3	(Denmark) K Rytter Juhl (Denmark) C Pedersen
6	(Japan) S Tanaka (Japan) K Yonemoto	17	21	21
(Indonesia) D D Haris (Indonesia) R A Pradipta	21	15	12

Semifinals
8	(Japan) N Fukuman (Japan) K Yonao	16	21	14
6	(Japan) S Tanaka (Japan) K Yonemoto	21	14	21

=== Finals ===
Semifinals
7	(South Korea) Chang Ye-na (South Korea) Jung Kyung-eun	9	20
(South Korea) Lee So-hee (South Korea) Shin Seung-chan	21	22
8	(Japan) Naoko Fukuman (Japan) Kurumi Yonao	16	21	14
6	(Japan) Shiho Tanaka (Japan) Koharu Yonemoto	21	14	21

Final
(South Korea) Lee So-hee (South Korea) Shin Seung-chan	21	21
6	(Japan) Shiho Tanaka (Japan) Koharu Yonemoto	13	16

== Mixed doubles ==
=== Seeds ===
1. (China) Zheng Siwei / Chen Qingchen (final)
2. (China) Lu Kai / Huang Yaqiong (second round)
3. (Indonesia) Tontowi Ahmad / Liliyana Natsir (semifinals)
4. (England) Chris Adcock / Gabrielle Adcock (first round)
5. (China) Zhang Nan / Li Yinhui (quarterfinals)
6. (China) Wang Yilu / Huang Dongping (second round)
7. (Malaysia) Tan Kian Meng / Lai Pei Jing (first round)
8. (Hong Kong) Tang Chun Man / Tse Ying Suet (champion)

=== Top half ===
First round
1	(China) Zheng SW (China) Chen QC	21	21
(Denmark) M Mikkelsen (Denmark) M Surrow	14	17
(India) P J Chopra (India) N. S Reddy	17	15
(Republic of Ireland) S Magee (Republic of Ireland) C Magee	21	21
7	(Malaysia) Tan K M (Malaysia) Lai P J	17	10
(South Korea) Seo S-j (South Korea) Kim H-n	21	21
(Netherlands) R Tabeling (Netherlands) C Seinen	22	21
Q1	(Russia) I Sozonov (Russia) E Kosetskaya	20	18
4	(England) C Adcock (England) G Adcock	17	24
(Japan) Y Kobayashi (Japan) M Matsutomo	21	26
Q2	(India) S Rankireddy (India) A Ponnappa	19	17
Q3	(Denmark) N Nohr (Denmark) S Thygesen	21	21
6	(China) Wang YL (China) Huang DP	21	21
(Germany) M E Seidel (Germany) L Efler	9	13
(South Korea) Kim J-h (South Korea) Lee S-h	15	25	14
(Malaysia) Goh S H (Malaysia) S J Lai	21	23	21

Second round
1	(China) Zheng SW (China) Chen QC	21	21
(Republic of Ireland) S Magee (Republic of Ireland) C Magee	12	13
(South Korea) Seo S-j (South Korea) Kim H-n	26	21	21
(Netherlands) R Tabeling (Netherlands) C Seinen	28	19	18
(Japan) Y Kobayashi (Japan) M Matsutomo	13	17
Q3	(Denmark) N Nohr (Denmark) S Thygesen	21	21
6	(China) Wang YL (China) Huang DP	14	21	18
(Malaysia) Goh S H (Malaysia) S J Lai	21	16	21

Quarterfinals
1	(China) Zheng SW (China) Chen QC	21	21
(South Korea) Seo S-j (South Korea) Kim H-n	12	15
Q3	(Denmark) N Nohr (Denmark) S Thygesen	21	12
(Malaysia) Goh S H (Malaysia) S J Lai	23	21

Semifinals
1	(China) Zheng SW (China) Chen QC	21	21
(Malaysia) Goh S H (Malaysia) S J Lai	16	16

=== Bottom half ===
First round
(Germany) M Lamsfuß (Germany) I Herttrich	18	18
Q4	(Japan) T Hoki (Japan) S Hirota	21	21
(Denmark) M Christiansen (Denmark) C Pedersen	19	14
5	(China) Zhang N (China) Li YH	21	21
(Denmark) A S Rasmussen (Denmark) L Kjærsfeldt	13	21	21
(Thailand) D Puavaranukroh (Thailand) P Supajirakul	21	14	13
(Finland) A Kaisti (Finland) J Nyström	14	16
3	(Indonesia) T Ahmad (Indonesia) L Natsir	21	21
(England) M Ellis (England) L Smith	15	21	21
(Malaysia) Chan P S (Malaysia) Cheah Y S	21	12	18
(England) B Lane (England) J Pugh	16	21	14
8	(Hong Kong) Tang C M (Hong Kong) Tse Y S	21	19	21
(Denmark) A Bond (Denmark) D Søby	22	14	12
(France) R Labar (France) A Fontaine	20	21	21
(Chinese Taipei) Lee Y (Chinese Taipei) Hsu Y-c	14	11
2	(China) Lu K (China) Huang YQ	21	21

Second round
Q4	(Japan) T Hoki (Japan) S Hirota	19	21	20
5	(China) Zhang N (China) Li YH	21	18	22
(Denmark) A S Rasmussen (Denmark) L Kjærsfeldt	16	14
3	(Indonesia) T Ahmad (Indonesia) L Natsir	21	21
(England) M Ellis (England) L Smith	11	16
8	(Hong Kong) Tang C M (Hong Kong) Tse Y S	21	21
(France) R Labar (France) A Fontaine	21	30
2	(China) Lu K (China) Huang YQ	19	29

Quarterfinals
5	(China) Zhang N (China) Li YH	10	16
3	(Indonesia) T Ahmad (Indonesia) L Natsir	21	21
8	(Hong Kong) Tang C M (Hong Kong) Tse Y S	15	21	21
(France) R Labar (France) A Fontaine	21	13	11

Semifinals
3	(Indonesia) T Ahmad (Indonesia) L Natsir	16	18
8	(Hong Kong) Tang C M (Hong Kong) Tse Y S	21	21

=== Finals ===
Semifinals
1	(China) Zheng Siwei (China) Chen Qingchen	21	21
(Malaysia) Goh Soon Huat (Malaysia) Shevon Jemie Lai	16	16
3	(Indonesia) Tontowi Ahmad (Indonesia) Liliyana Natsir	16	18
8	(Hong Kong) Tang Chun Man (Hong Kong) Tse Ying Suet	21	21

Final
1	(China) Zheng Siwei (China) Chen Qingchen	22	21	21
8	(Hong Kong) Tang Chun Man (Hong Kong) Tse Ying Suet	24	19	23

Preceded by 2016 Denmark Super Series Premier	Denmark Open	Succeeded by 2018 Denmark Open (badminton)
Preceded by 2017 Japan Super Series	BWF Super Series; 2017 BWF Season	Succeeded by 2017 French Super Series
