= Shin Seung-chan =

South Korean badminton player

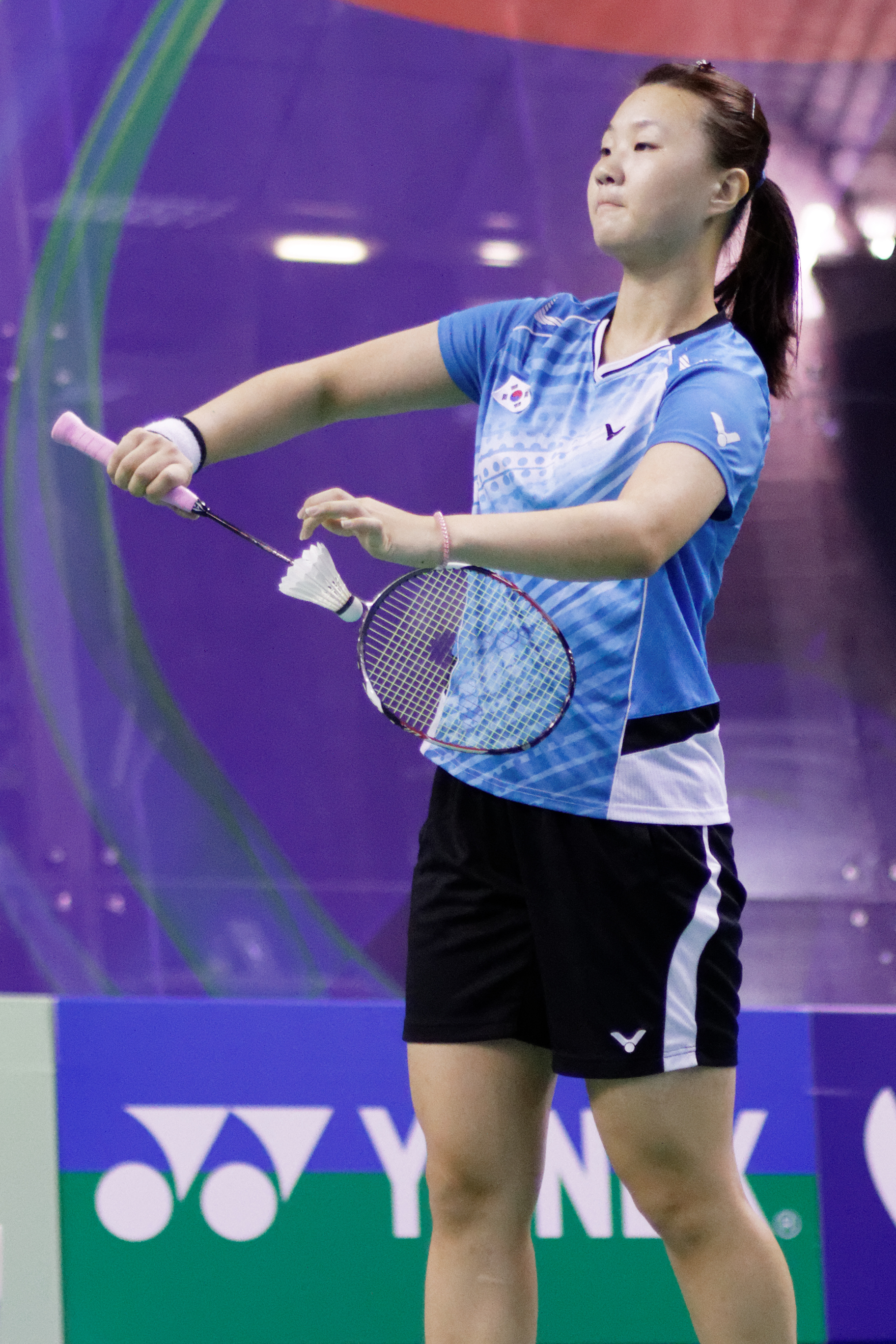
- Shin Seung-chan at the 2013 French Super Series

Personal information
- Born: 6 December 1994 (age 31) Gochang-gun, North Jeolla Province, South Korea
- Height: 1.73 m (5 ft 8 in)
- Weight: 70 kg (154 lb)

Sport
- Country: South Korea
- Sport: Badminton
- Handedness: Right

Women's & mixed doubles
- Highest ranking: 2 (WD with Jung Kyung-eun, 24 November 2016); 2 (WD with Lee So-hee, 21 December 2021); 19 (XD with Kim Gi-jung, 10 February 2017)
- BWF profile
Medal record
Women's badminton
Representing South Korea
Olympic Games
Bronze medal – third place	2016 Rio de Janeiro	Women's doubles
World Championships
Silver medal – second place	2021 Huelva	Women's doubles
Bronze medal – third place	2014 Copenhagen	Women's doubles
Sudirman Cup
Bronze medal – third place	2015 Dongguan	Mixed team
Bronze medal – third place	2021 Vantaa	Mixed team
Uber Cup
Gold medal – first place	2022 Bangkok	Women's team
Silver medal – second place	2016 Kunshan	Women's team
Bronze medal – third place	2018 Bangkok	Women's team
Bronze medal – third place	2020 Aarhus	Women's team
Asia Team Championships
Silver medal – second place	2020 Manila	Women's team
Bronze medal – third place	2016 Hyderabad	Women's team
Bronze medal – third place	2018 Alor Setar	Women's team
Summer Universiade
Gold medal – first place	2013 Kazan	Mixed team
Gold medal – first place	2015 Gwangju	Mixed team
Gold medal – first place	2015 Gwangju	Mixed doubles
Gold medal – first place	2015 Gwangju	Women's doubles
Bronze medal – third place	2013 Kazan	Women's doubles
World Junior Championships
Gold medal – first place	2011 Taipei	Girls' doubles
Gold medal – first place	2012 Chiba	Girls' doubles
Silver medal – second place	2010 Guadalajara	Mixed team
Silver medal – second place	2011 Taipei	Mixed team
Bronze medal – third place	2012 Chiba	Mixed team
Asian Junior Championships
Gold medal – first place	2012 Gimcheon	Girls' doubles
Silver medal – second place	2008 Kuala Lumpur	Mixed team
Bronze medal – third place	2012 Gimcheon	Mixed team

Shin Seung-chan (Korean: 신승찬; Korean pronunciation: [ɕin.sɯŋ.tɕʰan]; born 6 December 1994) is a South Korean doubles specialist badminton player. she is widely recognized for her exceptional defensive skills and powerful smashes, which helped her secure a bronze medal at the 2016 Summer Olympics alongside her partner Jung Kyung-eun. Throughout her career, Shin has consistently remained at the top of the BWF world rankings, achieving significant success with long-time partner Lee So-hee, including winning a silver and a bronze at the 2021 and 2014 BWF World Championships respectively. She also helped the Korean national team to win the 2022 Uber Cup.

Shin demonstrated exceptional talent early in her career by winning the gold medal at the 2011 and 2012 BWF World Junior Championships, and also at the 2012 Asian Junior Championships. Shin continues to excel by balancing his professional career and studies at the Chosun University, and her success at the university level was epitomized by her performance at the 2013 and 2015 Summer Universiade, where she contributed point for South Korea to clinch the gold medal in the team event in both years, and also secured the mixed and women's doubles gold in 2015.

== Achievements ==
=== Olympic Games ===
Women's doubles
Year	Venue	Partner	Opponent	Score	Result
2016	Riocentro – Pavilion 4, Rio de Janeiro, Brazil	(South Korea) Jung Kyung-eun	(China) Tang Yuanting (China) Yu Yang	21–8, 21–17	Bronze

=== BWF World Championships ===
Women's doubles
Year	Venue	Partner	Opponent	Score	Result
2014	Ballerup Super Arena, Copenhagen, Denmark	(South Korea) Lee So-hee	(China) Tian Qing (China) Zhao Yunlei	13–21, 10–21	Bronze
2021	Palacio de los Deportes Carolina Marín, Huelva, Spain	(South Korea) Lee So-hee	(China) Chen Qingchen (China) Jia Yifan	16–21, 17–21	Silver

=== Summer Universiade ===
Women's doubles
Year	Venue	Partner	Opponent	Score	Result
2013	Tennis Academy, Kazan, Russia	(South Korea) Lee So-hee	(China) Luo Yu (China) Tian Qing	12–21, 17–21	Bronze
2015	Hwasun Hanium Culture Sports Center; Hwasun, South Korea	(South Korea) Lee So-hee	(China) ~~Ou Dongni~~ (China) ~~Yu Xiaohan~~ (disqualified)	21–16, 21–13	Gold

Mixed doubles
Year	Venue	Partner	Opponent	Score	Result
2015	Hwasun Hanium Culture Sports Center; Hwasun, South Korea	(South Korea) Kim Gi-jung	(Chinese Taipei) Lu Ching-yao (Chinese Taipei) Chiang Kai-hsin	21–14, 21–11	Gold

=== BWF World Junior Championships ===
Girls' doubles
Year	Venue	Partner	Opponent	Score	Result
2011	Taoyuan Arena, Taoyuan City, Taiwan	(South Korea) Lee So-hee	(Indonesia) Shella Devi Aulia (Indonesia) Anggia Shitta Awanda	21–16, 13–21, 21–9	Gold
2012	Chiba Port Arena, Chiba, Japan	(South Korea) Lee So-hee	(China) Huang Yaqiong (China) Yu Xiaohan	21–14, 18–21, 21–18	Gold

=== Asian Junior Championships ===
Girls' doubles
Year	Venue	Partner	Opponent	Score	Result
2012	Gimcheon Indoor Stadium, Gimcheon, South Korea	(South Korea) Lee So-hee	(China) Huang Yaqiong (China) Yu Xiaohan	17–21, 21–15, 21–17	Gold

=== BWF World Tour (5 titles, 9 runners-up) ===
The BWF World Tour, which was announced on 19 March 2017 and implemented in 2018, is a series of elite badminton tournaments, sanctioned by Badminton World Federation (BWF). The BWF World Tour is divided into six levels, namely World Tour Finals, Super 1000, Super 750, Super 500, Super 300 (part of the HSBC World Tour), and the BWF Tour Super 100.

Women's doubles
Year	Tournament	Level	Partner	Opponent	Score	Result
2018	Fuzhou China Open	Super 750	(South Korea) Lee So-hee	(Japan) Mayu Matsumoto (Japan) Wakana Nagahara	23–21, 21–18	(gold) Winner
2018	Hong Kong Open	Super 500	(South Korea) Lee So-hee	(Japan) Yuki Fukushima (Japan) Sayaka Hirota	18–21, 17–21	(silver) Runner-up
2018	Korea Masters	Super 300	(South Korea) Lee So-hee	(South Korea) Chang Ye-na (South Korea) Jung Kyung-eun	14–21, 17–21	(silver) Runner-up
2018	BWF World Tour Finals	World Tour Finals	(South Korea) Lee So-hee	(Japan) Misaki Matsutomo (Japan) Ayaka Takahashi	12–21, 20–22	(silver) Runner-up
2019	Korea Open	Super 500	(South Korea) Lee So-hee	(South Korea) Kim So-yeong (South Korea) Kong Hee-yong	21–13, 19–21, 17–21	(silver) Runner-up
2019	French Open	Super 750	(South Korea) Lee So-hee	(South Korea) Kim So-yeong (South Korea) Kong Hee-yong	16–21, 21–19, 21–12	(gold) Winner
2019	Fuzhou China Open	Super 750	(South Korea) Lee So-hee	(Japan) Yuki Fukushima (Japan) Sayaka Hirota	17–21, 15–21	(silver) Runner-up
2020 (II)	Thailand Open	Super 1000	(South Korea) Lee So-hee	(South Korea) Kim So-yeong (South Korea) Kong Hee-yong	18–21, 19–21	(silver) Runner-up
2020	BWF World Tour Finals	World Tour Finals	(South Korea) Lee So-hee	(South Korea) Kim So-yeong (South Korea) Kong Hee-yong	15–21, 26–24, 21–19	(gold) Winner
2021	Denmark Open	Super 1000	(South Korea) Lee So-hee	(China) Huang Dongping (China) Zheng Yu	15–21, 17–21	(silver) Runner-up
2021	French Open	Super 750	(South Korea) Lee So-hee	(South Korea) Kim So-yeong (South Korea) Kong Hee-yong	21–17, 21–12	(gold) Winner
2023	Taipei Open	Super 300	(South Korea) Lee Yu-lim	(Indonesia) Febriana Dwipuji Kusuma (Indonesia) Amalia Cahaya Pratiwi	18–21, 21–17, 21–17	(gold) Winner
2024	Malaysia Masters	Super 500	(South Korea) Lee Yu-lim	(Japan) Rin Iwanaga (Japan) Kie Nakanishi	21–17, 19–21, 18–21	(silver) Runner-up

Mixed doubles
Year	Tournament	Level	Partner	Opponent	Score	Result
2018	Korea Masters	Super 300	(South Korea) Choi Sol-gyu	(South Korea) Ko Sung-hyun (South Korea) Eom Hye-won	12–21, 21–15, 18–21	(silver) Runner-up

=== BWF Superseries (3 titles, 3 runners-up) ===
The BWF Superseries, which was launched on 14 December 2006 and implemented in 2007, was a series of elite badminton tournaments, sanctioned by the Badminton World Federation (BWF). BWF Superseries levels were Superseries and Superseries Premier. A season of Superseries consisted of twelve tournaments around the world that had been introduced since 2011. Successful players were invited to the Superseries Finals, which were held at the end of each year.

Women's doubles
Year	Tournament	Partner	Opponent	Score	Result
2015	Denmark Open	(South Korea) Jung Kyung-eun	(China) Tian Qing (China) Zhao Yunlei	Walkover	(gold) Winner
2016	Malaysia Open	(South Korea) Jung Kyung-eun	(China) Tang Yuanting (China) Yu Yang	11–21, 17–21	(silver) Runner-up
2016	Korea Open	(South Korea) Jung Kyung-eun	(China) Luo Ying (China) Luo Yu	21–13, 21–11	(gold) Winner
2016	Denmark Open	(South Korea) Jung Kyung-eun	(Japan) Misaki Matsutomo (Japan) Ayaka Takahashi	21–19, 11–21, 16–21	(silver) Runner-up
2017	Denmark Open	(South Korea) Lee So-hee	(Japan) Shiho Tanaka (Japan) Koharu Yonemoto	21–13, 21–16	(gold) Winner
2017	French Open	(South Korea) Lee So-hee	(Indonesia) Greysia Polii (Indonesia) Apriyani Rahayu	17–21, 15–21	(silver) Runner-up

BWF Super Series Finals tournament
BWF Super Series Premier tournament
BWF Super Series tournament

=== BWF Grand Prix (9 titles, 5 runners-up) ===
The BWF Grand Prix had two levels, the Grand Prix and Grand Prix Gold. It was a series of badminton tournaments sanctioned by the Badminton World Federation (BWF) and played between 2007 and 2017.

Women's doubles
Year	Tournament	Partner	Opponent	Score	Result
2012	Korea Grand Prix Gold	(South Korea) Lee So-hee	(South Korea) Eom Hye-won (South Korea) Jang Ye-na	13–21, 17–21	(silver) Runner-up
2013	Swiss Open	(South Korea) Lee So-hee	(South Korea) Jung Kyung-eun (South Korea) Kim Ha-na	21–23, 16–21	(silver) Runner-up
2013	Chinese Taipei Open	(South Korea) Lee So-hee	(South Korea) Jung Kyung-eun (South Korea) Kim Ha-na	Walkover	(silver) Runner-up
2014	Korea Grand Prix	(South Korea) Lee So-hee	(South Korea) Chang Ye-na (South Korea) Yoo Hae-won	15–8 retired	(gold) Winner
2015	Korea Masters	(South Korea) Jung Kyung-eun	(South Korea) Chang Ye-na (South Korea) Lee So-hee	7–21, 21–16, 19–21	(silver) Runner-up
2015	Macau Open	(South Korea) Jung Kyung-eun	(Hong Kong) Poon Lok Yan (Hong Kong) Tse Ying Suet	18–21, 15–15 retired	(gold) Winner
2015	U.S. Grand Prix	(South Korea) Jung Kyung-eun	(South Korea) Chang Ye-na (South Korea) Lee So-hee	24–22, 18–21, 21–12	(gold) Winner
2016	Syed Modi International	(South Korea) Jung Kyung-eun	(Netherlands) Eefje Muskens (Netherlands) Selena Piek	21–15, 21–13	(gold) Winner
2016	Korea Masters	(South Korea) Jung Kyung-eun	(South Korea) Chae Yoo-jung (South Korea) Kim So-yeong	21–14, 21–14	(gold) Winner
2017	U.S. Open	(South Korea) Lee So-hee	(Japan) Mayu Matsumoto (Japan) Wakana Nagahara	21–16, 21–13	(gold) Winner
2017	Korea Masters	(South Korea) Lee So-hee	(South Korea) Kim So-yeong (South Korea) Kong Hee-yong	21–18, 23–21	(gold) Winner

Mixed doubles
Year	Tournament	Partner	Opponent	Score	Result
2014	Korea Grand Prix	(South Korea) Choi Sol-gyu	(South Korea) Shin Baek-cheol (South Korea) Chang Ye-na	Walkover	(gold) Winner
2017	Canada Open	(South Korea) Kim Won-ho	(South Korea) Choi Sol-gyu (South Korea) Chae Yoo-jung	21–19, 21–16	(gold) Winner
2017	U.S. Open	(South Korea) Kim Won-ho	(South Korea) Seo Seung-jae (South Korea) Kim Ha-na	21–16, 14–21, 11–21	(silver) Runner-up

BWF Grand Prix Gold tournament
BWF Grand Prix tournament

=== BWF International Challenge/Series (6 titles, 1 runner-up) ===
Women's doubles
Year	Tournament	Partner	Opponent	Score	Result
2012	Iceland International	(South Korea) Lee So-hee	(South Korea) Go Ah-ra (South Korea) Yoo Hae-won	21–18, 21–16	(gold) Winner
2012	Tata Open India International	(South Korea) Lee So-hee	(India) Aparna Balan (India) N. Sikki Reddy	19–21, 21–13, 21–17	(gold) Winner
2023	Vietnam International	(South Korea) Lee Yu-lim	(Indonesia) Jesita Putri Miantoro (Indonesia) Febi Setianingrum	21–18, 21–10	(gold) Winner
2023	Osaka International	(South Korea) Lee Yu-lim	(Japan) Mizuki Otake (Japan) Miyu Takahashi	23–21, 21–13	(gold) Winner
2023	Northern Marianas Open	(South Korea) Lee Yu-lim	(Chinese Taipei) Hsu Ya-ching (Chinese Taipei) Lin Wan-ching	19–21, 21–18, 20–22	(silver) Runner-up

Mixed doubles
Year	Tournament	Partner	Opponent	Score	Result
2023	Osaka International	(South Korea) Wang Chan	(South Korea) Kim Young-hyuk (South Korea) Lee Yu-lim	21–14, 14–21, 21–15	(gold) Winner
2023	Northern Marianas Open	(South Korea) Wang Chan	(Japan) Hashiru Shimono (Japan) Miku Shigeta	21–13, 21–15	(gold) Winner

BWF International Challenge tournament
BWF International Series tournament
