= 2011 BWF World Junior Championships – girls' doubles =

2011 BWF World Junior Championships girls' doubles
Tournament details
- Dates: 2 – 6 November 2011
- Edition: 13th
- Level: International
- Venue: Taoyuan Arena
- Location: Taoyuan City, Taiwan

The girls' doubles event for the 2011 BWF World Junior Championships was held between 2 November and 6 November. Lee So-hee & Shin Seung-chan from South Korea won gold medal.

== Seeded ==
1. (Indonesia) Suci Rizky Andini / Tiara Rosalia Nuraidah (semifinals)
2. (Malaysia) Chow Mei Kuan / Lee Meng Yean (third round)
3. (Denmark) Sandra-Maria Jensen / Line Kjærsfeldt (second round)
4. (South Korea) Lee So-hee / Shin Seung-chan (champions)
5. (Turkey) Neslihan Kılıç / Neslihan Yiğit (second round)
6. (Indonesia) Shella Devi Aulia / Anggia Shitta Awanda (final)
7. (Malaysia) Soniia Cheah / Yang Li Lian (quarter-finals)
8. (Thailand) Pacharakamol Arkornsakul / Chonthicha Kittiharakul (quarter-finals)

== Draw ==
=== Finals ===
Semifinals
1	(Indonesia) Suci Rizky Andini (Indonesia) Tiara Rosalia Nuraidah	23	20	5
3/4	(South Korea) Lee So-hee (South Korea) Shin Seung-chan	21	22	21
(South Korea) Han So-yeon (South Korea) Kim Hyo-min	13	20
5/8	(Indonesia) Shella Devi Aulia (Indonesia) Anggia Shitta Awanda	21	22

Final
3/4	(South Korea) Lee So-hee (South Korea) Shin Seung-chan	21	13	21
5/8	(Indonesia) Shella Devi Aulia (Indonesia) Anggia Shitta Awanda	16	21	9

==== Section 1 ====
First round
(United States) L Tong (United States) J Ye	7	6
(Chinese Taipei) Chen P-J (Chinese Taipei) Kao C-W	21	21
(Australia) V Mak (Australia) W Chen	22	21
(Macau) Ieong P-S (Macau) Wong K-I	20	14
(Japan) Y Fukushima (Japan) N Shinoya	21	21
(Malaysia) J Choong (Malaysia) SJ Lai	14	19

Second round
1	(Indonesia) S Andini (Indonesia) T Nuraidah	21	21
(India) G Ghate (India) M Kukkapalli	11	16
(Thailand) N Lam (Thailand) M Phattanaphitoon	21	21
(Chinese Taipei) Chen P-J (Chinese Taipei) Kao C-W	11	13
5/8	(Turkey) N Kılıç (Turkey) N Yiğit	2^{r}
(Australia) V Mak (Australia) W Chen	3
(France) L Baumann (France) L Palermo	13	22	15
(Japan) Y Fukushima (Japan) N Shinoya	21	20	21

Third round
1	(Indonesia) S Andini (Indonesia) T Nuraidah	21	21
(Thailand) N Lam (Thailand) M Phattanaphitoon	10	19
(Australia) V Mak (Australia) W Chen	15	16
(Japan) Y Fukushima (Japan) N Shinoya	21	21

Quarter Final
1	(Indonesia) S Andini (Indonesia) T Nuraidah	21	21
(Japan) Y Fukushima (Japan) N Shinoya	14	17

==== Section 2 ====
First round
(Indonesia) R Amelia (Indonesia) G Widjaja	21	21
(Chinese Taipei) Chen S-Y (Chinese Taipei) Chen T-Y	13	12
(Singapore) Liang X (Singapore) Tan WH	14	14
(Thailand) W Hongchookeat (Thailand) P Supajirakul	21	21
(Germany) R Hacks (Germany) J Karnott	21	14	26
(Sri Lanka) O Kuruppu (Sri Lanka) L Shehani	13	21	24
(Canada) J Chan (Canada) K Tung	14	13
(Denmark) A Madsen (Denmark) M Poulsen	21	21

Second round
3/4	(South Korea) Lee S-H (South Korea) Shin S-C	21	15	24
(Indonesia) R Amelia (Indonesia) G Widjaja	15	21	22
(Hong Kong) Tsang WC (Hong Kong) Yung NW	17	14
(Thailand) W Hongchookeat (Thailand) P Supajirakul	21	21
5/8	(Malaysia) S Cheah (Malaysia) Yang LL	21	21
(Germany) R Hacks (Germany) J Karnott	13	16
(England) C Birch (England) E Westwood	21	21
(Denmark) A Madsen (Denmark) M Poulsen	19	14

Third round
3/4	(South Korea) Lee S-h (South Korea) Shin S-c	18	21	21
(Thailand) W Hongchookeat (Thailand) P Supajirakul	21	18	8
5/8	(Malaysia) S Cheah (Malaysia) Yang LL	21	21
(England) C Birch (England) E Westwood	18	12

Quarter Final
3/4	(South Korea) Lee S-h (South Korea) Shin S-c	21	21
5/8	(Malaysia) S Cheah (Malaysia) Yang LL	14	12

==== Section 3 ====
First round
(Hong Kong) Cheung YM (Hong Kong) Yuen SY	21	21
(Germany) A Dörr (Germany) F Volkmann	15	19
(Japan) S Hayakawa (Japan) N Okuhara	21	21
(Egypt) N Ashraf (Egypt) T Aya	5	3
(South Korea) Han S-y (South Korea) Kim H-m	21	21
(Australia) J Guan (Australia) G Somerville	13	12
(Russia) O Morozova (Russia) N Rogova	8	21	16
(Vietnam) Lê TH (Vietnam) Phạm NT	21	18	21

Second round
(Hong Kong) Cheung YM (Hong Kong) Yuen SY	21	21
(Turkey) C Fere (Turkey) E Yazgan	7	11
(Japan) S Hayakawa (Japan) N Okuhara	18	13
5/8	(Thailand) P Arkornsakul (Thailand) C Kittiharakul	21	21
(South Korea) Han S-y (South Korea) Kim H-m	21	21
(United States) E Kan (United States) D Long	13	11
(Vietnam) Lê TH (Vietnam) Phạm NT	21	21
3/4	(Denmark) S Jensen (Denmark) L Kjærsfeldt	16	18

Third round
(Hong Kong) Cheung YM (Hong Kong) Yuen SY	17	22	10
5/8	(Thailand) P Arkornsakul (Thailand) C Kittiharakul	21	20	21
(South Korea) Han S-y (South Korea) Kim H-m	21	21
(Vietnam) Lê TH (Vietnam) Phạm NT	11	14

Quarter Final
5/8	(Thailand) P Arkornsakul (Thailand) C Kittiharakul	18	12
(South Korea) Han S-y (South Korea) Kim H-m	21	21

==== Section 4 ====
First round
(Singapore) A Latib (Singapore) Toh SF	21	22
(Finland) A Mikkelä (Finland) J Nyström	12	20
(Canada) A Giuffre (Canada) C Tsai	19	26
(England) S Brown (England) H Smith	21	28
(South Korea) Chae Y-j (South Korea) Kim C-m	21	21
(Chinese Taipei) Shuai P-L (Chinese Taipei) Wu T-J	13	13

Second round
(Singapore) A Latib (Singapore) Toh SF	21	18	21
(India) S Rane (India) A Sunil	17	21	19
(England) S Brown (England) H Smith	15	18
5/8	(Indonesia) S Aulia (Indonesia) A Awanda	21	21
(South Korea) Chae Y-j (South Korea) Kim C-m	21	21
(Netherlands) G Mahulette (Netherlands) M Halkema	15	8
(Japan) C Hoshi (Japan) A Sakuramoto	21	16
2	(Malaysia) Chow MK (Malaysia) Lee MY	23	21

Third round
(Singapore) A Latib (Singapore) Toh SF	14	18
5/8	(Indonesia) S Aulia (Indonesia) A Awanda	21	21
(South Korea) Chae Y-j (South Korea) Kim C-m	23	21	21
2	(Malaysia) Chow MK (Malaysia) Lee MY	25	16	15

Quarter Final
5/8	(Indonesia) S Aulia (Indonesia) A Awanda	16	21	21
(South Korea) Chae Y-j (South Korea) Kim C-m	21	18	14
