= Lee So-hee =

South Korean badminton player (born 1994)

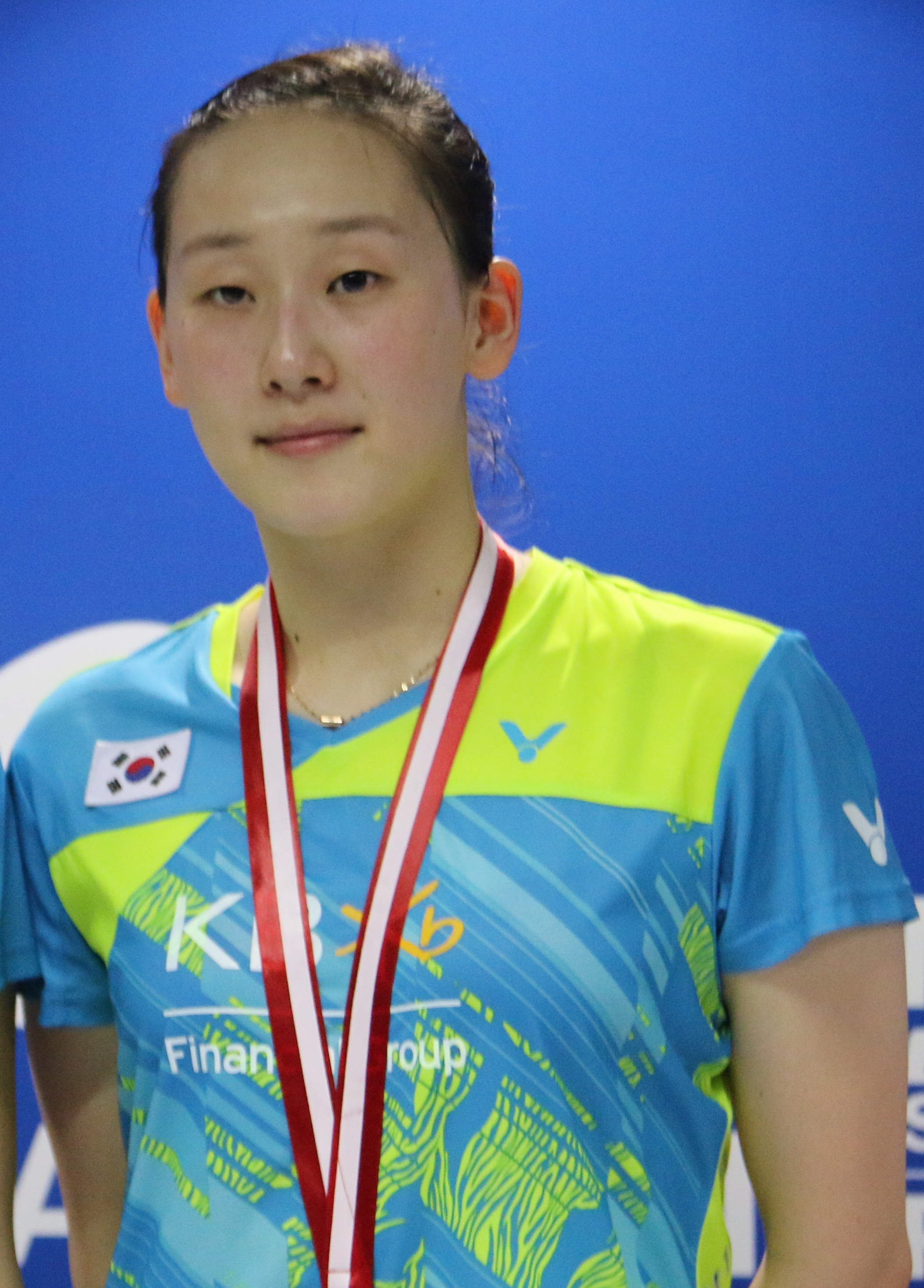
- Lee after winning 2017 Indonesia Super Series Premier

Personal information
- Born: 14 June 1994 (age 32) Ulsan, South Korea
- Height: 1.71 m (5 ft 7 in)
- Weight: 67 kg (148 lb)

Sport
- Country: South Korea
- Sport: Badminton
- Handedness: Right

Women's & mixed doubles
- Highest ranking: 1 (WD with Baek Ha-na, 29 October 2024); 2 (WD with Chang Ye-na, 9 November 2017); 2 (WD with Shin Seung-chan, 21 December 2021); 35 (XD with Lee Yong-dae, 30 June 2016)
- Current ranking: 2 (WD with Baek Ha-na, 17 November 2026)
- BWF profile
Medal record
Women's badminton
Representing South Korea
World Championships
Gold medal – first place	2026 New Dehli	Women's doubles
Silver medal – second place	2021 Huelva	Women's doubles
Bronze medal – third place	2014 Copenhagen	Women's doubles
Sudirman Cup
Gold medal – first place	2017 Gold Coast	Mixed team
Silver medal – second place	2023 Suzhou	Mixed team
Silver medal – second place	2025 Xiamen	Mixed team
Bronze medal – third place	2015 Dongguan	Mixed team
Bronze medal – third place	2021 Vantaa	Mixed team
Uber Cup
Gold medal – first place	2022 Bangkok	Women's team
Gold medal – first place	2026 Horsens	Women's team
Silver medal – second place	2016 Kunshan	Women's team
Bronze medal – third place	2020 Aarhus	Women's team
Bronze medal – third place	2024 Chengdu	Women's team
Asian Games
Gold medal – first place	2022 Hangzhou	Women's team
Gold medal – first place	2026 Aichi–Nagoya	Women's doubles
Silver medal – second place	2022 Hangzhou	Women's doubles
Bronze medal – third place	2026 Aichi–Nagoya	Women's team
Asian Championships
Gold medal – first place	2024 Ningbo	Women's doubles
Silver medal – second place	2023 Dubai	Women's doubles
Bronze medal – third place	2016 Wuhan	Women's doubles
Bronze medal – third place	2017 Wuhan	Women's doubles
Asia Mixed Team Championships
Silver medal – second place	2017 Ho Chi Minh	Mixed team
Silver medal – second place	2023 Dubai	Mixed team
Asia Team Championships
Gold medal – first place	2026 Qingdao	Women's team
Silver medal – second place	2020 Manila	Women's team
Bronze medal – third place	2016 Hyderabad	Women's team
Bronze medal – third place	2018 Alor Setar	Women's team
Summer Universiade
Gold medal – first place	2013 Kazan	Mixed team
Gold medal – first place	2015 Gwangju	Women's doubles
Gold medal – first place	2015 Gwangju	Mixed team
Bronze medal – third place	2013 Kazan	Women's doubles
World Junior Championships
Gold medal – first place	2011 Taipei	Girls' doubles
Gold medal – first place	2012 Chiba	Girls' doubles
Silver medal – second place	2010 Guadalajara	Mixed team
Silver medal – second place	2011 Taipei	Mixed team
Bronze medal – third place	2010 Guadalajara	Girls' doubles
Bronze medal – third place	2012 Chiba	Mixed team
Asian Junior Championships
Gold medal – first place	2012 Gimcheon	Girls' doubles
Bronze medal – third place	2012 Gimcheon	Mixed team

- Lee So-hee
- Hangul: 이소희
- Hanja: 李紹希
- RR: I Sohui
- MR: I Sohŭi

Lee So-hee (Korean: 이소희; Korean pronunciation: [i.so.ɦi]; born 14 June 1994) is a South Korean badminton player. She is considered one of the most consistent doubles players of the modern era, as evidenced by her achievements over the years with different partners. Partnering Shin Seung-chan, she claimed a silver and a bronze at the 2021 and 2014 BWF World Championships respectively. While with Chang Ye-na, she won two bronze medals at the 2016 and 2017 Asian Championships. Lee reached her peak partnering Baek Ha-na, when the two topped the women's doubles rankings in the BWF World Rankings in October 2024, with achievements including winning a world title at the 2026 BWF World Championships, a gold medal at the 2024 Asian Championships, a silver at the 2022 Asian Games, and two consecutive wins at the BWF World Tour Finals in 2024 and 2025. In addition, Lee was part of the Korean national team that won the gold medal at the 2022 Asian Games, 2017 Sudirman Cup and 2022 and 2026 Uber Cup.

During her junior years, Lee was the gold medalists at the 2011 and 2012 BWF World Junior Championships, and also at the 2012 Asian Junior Championships. She represented Konkuk University and competed at the Summer Universiade, helped the Korean team clinching the gold medal in the team event in 2013 and 2015, and also won the gold in women's doubles with partner Shin Seung-chan in 2015.

== Career ==
=== Early career ===
Lee So-hee was born on 14 June 1994, in Ulsan, South Korea. Growing up, she was an energetic child who was exposed to a wide range of sports from an early age. As time went on, her teacher began to notice her talent and encouraged her to try badminton. From her very first attempts, young Lee showed clear potential, quickly taking to the sport. Badminton became the perfect outlet for her energy, and before long, she was competing seriously. She made her debut on the competitive stage at the 2010 Korea Open Super Series, partnering with Choi Hye-in in the women's doubles. Though unseeded, the pair exceeded expectations by reaching the quarter-finals, where they were eventually defeated by the experienced duo of Ha Jung-eun and Lee Kyung-won. Lee competed at the 2010 BWF World Junior Championships, where she won the silver medal in the team event and a bronze in the girls' doubles with Choi.

=== 2011–2012: Asian and World Junior champions ===
Lee made her first major mark on the international stage by winning the gold medal at the World Junior Championships in the girls' doubles with Shin Seung-chan. This victory marked the beginning of their junior-level dominance as they topped the World junior ranking, which led Korean media to highlight her as a "future pillar" of the national women's doubles. Her potential was recognized early by the Korean national team, leading to her official induction into the senior national team at just 17 years old. On the international circuit, she reached the final in the mixed doubles and semi-final in the women's doubles at the Turkey International.

Continuing her partnership with Shin Seung-chan in 2012, Lee successfully defended her World Junior Championships title and added an Asian Junior Championships gold to her collection. Lee and Shin also won the Iceland and India International, as well being finalist in the Korea Grapnd Prix Gold. She was then honored with the Gyeonggi-do Sports Award for her contribution to regional sporting pride.

=== 2013–2014: World championships bronze medalist ===
Lee So-hee officially transitioned from a junior career to the senior international stage, immediately establishing herself as a cornerstone of the South Korean national team. She began 2013 by signing with the Daegyo Noonnoppi professional team in February. Representing Konkuk University, she also competed at the Summer Universiade in Kazan, Russia, where she secured a bronze medal in women's doubles with her long-time partner Shin Seung-chan and contributed to Korea's success in the mixed team event. She also reached the finals in the Swiss and Chinese Taipei Open Grand Prix Gold, but lost to Jung Kyung-eun and Kim Ha-na in both occasion.

In 2014, Lee and partner Shin Seung-chan secured a bronze medal at the World Championships. Beyond the championship majors, Lee displayed her versatility by winning the Canada Open with partner Choi Hye-in, and capping the year with a victory at the Korea Grand Prix with Shin.

=== 2015–2016: Universiade gold ===
In early 2015, Lee signed a sponsorship deal with the Incheon International Airport Skymons team. She competed in the Gwangju Summer Universiade, where she captured two gold medals: first by leading South Korea to a victory in the mixed team event, and subsequently by winning the women's doubles title alongside Shin Seung-chan after defeating China's Ou Dongni and Yu Xiaohan in a 21–16, 21–13. She also helping Korea secure a bronze medal at the Sudirman Cup in Dongguan. In preparation for 2016 Summer Olympics, Badminton Korea Association decided to separate Lee and Shin. Lee was paired with senior teammate Chang Ye-na, and the duo went on to win a title in the Korea Masters. This title also marks Lee's first Grand Prix Gold title. Besides that, the duo also finished runners-up in the Korea Open, Thailand Open, and the U.S. Grand Prix.

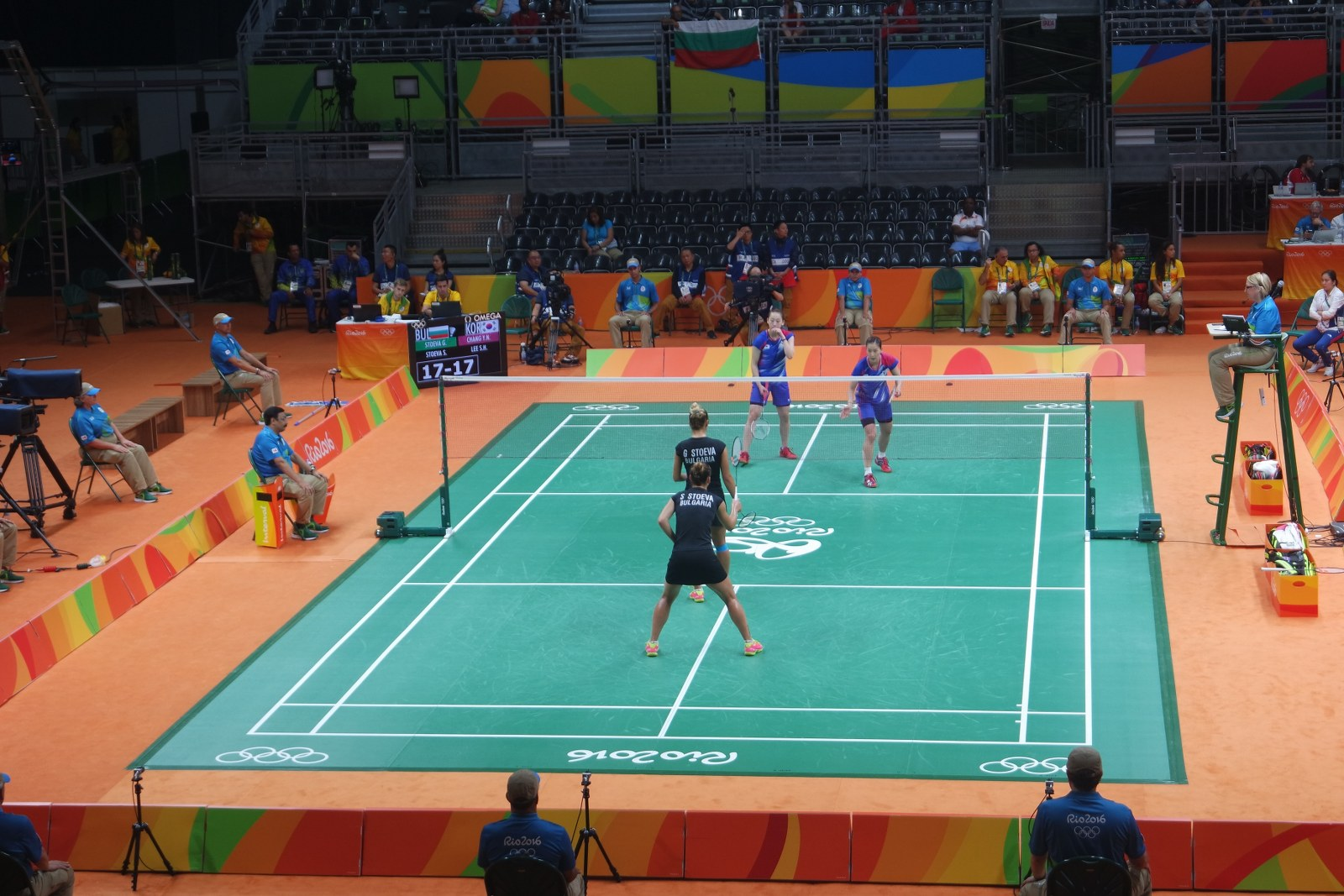
Lee (top left) with her partner Chang Ye-na against the Stoeva sisters at the 2016 Rio Olympics

In 2016, Lee focused on the women's doubles, primarily partnering Chang Ye-na. The duo enjoyed a successful year on the international circuit, notably capturing the China Open title after defeating Huang Dongping and Li Yinhui in the final. They also reached the finals of the French Open and the New Zealand Open, and secured a bronze medal at the Asian Championships in Wuhan. A major highlight of her year was making her Olympic debut at the 2016 Rio Games; however, Lee and Chang were eliminated in the quarter-finals.

=== 2017–2018: All England title ===
Lee achievements in 2017 began by winning the 2017 All England Open with Chang Ye-na. The duo demonstrated remarkable endurance, securing a bronze medal at the Asian Championships in Wuhan, and reaching the finals of Superseries events including the Indonesia Open and her home tournament, the Korea Open. Together with the national team, she secured a silver medal at the Asia Mixed Team Championships in Ho Chi Minh City when the team fell 0–3 to Japan, and later played in the quarter-finals of the Sudirman Cup, and South Korea reclaiming the world mixed team title by defeating China in the final. Mid-season, a strategic reunification with Shin Seung-chan yielded immediate victory at the U.S. Open, and a historic run in Europe, winning their first ever Superseries title as a pair in the Denmark Open and reaching the French Open final. She also won the Korea Masters in Gwangju. For these extraordinary efforts, including reaching the finals of the China Open with Kim Hye-rin, she was honored as the Best Player of the Year by the Badminton Korea Association.

In 2018, Lee overcame early-season setbacks, including a nagging injury, to finish the year as one of the most dominant forces in women's doubles alongside her partner Shin Seung-chan. Their season reached a brilliant peak in November at the Fuzhou China Open, where they broke Japan's long-standing dominance by defeating both the reigning Olympic champions and the 2018 World Champions, Mayu Matsumoto and Wakana Nagahara, in a straight-game final. This victory was a vital turning point for South Korean badminton following a medal-less run at the 2018 Jakarta–Palembang Asian Games, where Lee had competed but faced an early exit. Lee maintained this elite momentum through the end of the year, securing a runner-up at the Hong Kong Open, Korea Masters, and at the BWF World Tour Finals in Guangzhou.

=== 2019–2022: Tour Finals title; World Championships silver; and Uber Cup champion ===
In 2019, Lee re-established herself as a dominant force in the women's doubles, overcoming early-season injury concerns to achieve remarkable consistency with partner Shin. After recovering from the appendicitis surgery and thigh muscle tears, she made a comeback in the Basel World Championships, reaching the quarter-finals. The highlight of her year came in October at the French Open, where she captured the title after an intense all-Korean final against Kim So-yeong and Kong Hee-yong, winning 16–21, 21–19, 21–12. This victory marked her first major title in nearly a year and signaled a full return to form. Beyond this triumph, Lee demonstrated elite level play by reaching the finals of several high-stakes tournaments, including the Korea Open, and the Fuzhou China Open. Lee concluded the season at the BWF World Tour Finals in Guangzhou, where she finished as a semi-finalist, solidifying her year-end standing among the world's top five pairs.

Despite the COVID-19 pandemic-shortened season, Lee began the 2020 season with a strong run to the semi-finals of the All England Open, shortly before the international circuit was suspended. Upon the sport's return in early 2021, Lee reached her peak form in the "Bangkok Leg," where Lee and Shin finished runner-up in the Toyota Thailand Open to Kim So-yeong and Kong Hee-yong, and a week later beating Kim and Kong to captured her first-ever BWF World Tour Finals title. This momentum carried into the late 2021 European leg, where she secured a runner-up finish at the Denmark Open before successfully retaining her French Open title. Despite a bittersweet fourth-place finish at the 2020 Tokyo Olympics that held in mid 2021, Lee ended the season on a high note by securing a silver medal at the BWF World Championships in Huelva, Spain.

In 2022, Lee experienced a milestone defined by high-stakes team success and a significant transition in her professional partnership. A crowning achievement occurred in May at the Uber Cup in Bangkok, where Lee played a role in South Korea's dramatic 3–2 victory over China to claim the world team title; Lee and Shin secured a crucial point in the final by defeating the world number 1 pair, Chen Qingchen and Jia Yifan. Latter half of 2022 marked a major turning point as her long-standing partnership with Shin Seung-chan was restructured by the national coaching staff. Lee began a high-profile experimental pairing with Baek Ha-na, which yielded immediate international success; in their very first tournament together, they reached the final of the Denmark Open, signaling the start of a new elite chapter in Lee's career.

=== 2023–2025: World #1 ===
In 2023, Lee experienced a massive resurgence on the international stage following her new partnership with Baek Ha-na. Their most significant triumph was winning the Indonesia Open, where they defeated Japan's Fukushima and Hirota in straight games, marking the first time in 13 years a Korean women's doubles pair won this title. The duo's rapid ascent saw them reach a world ranking of number 2 by mid-year, a feat credited to their remarkable consistency across multiple title including the German Open and Malaysia Masters, as well finished runner-up in the Thailand Masters, All England Open, Singapore Open, and at the Asian Championships. On the team front, Lee played a critical role in the Sudirman Cup, helping South Korea secure a silver medal in Suzhou, and contributed to the historic women's team gold medal at the Asian Games, where they stunned the host nation China 3–0. At the end of 2023, they also reached the podium finish as runners-up at the China Open and the World Tour Finals, and also the women's doubles silver medal in the Asian Games.

In 2024, Lee and Baek reached the absolute summit of professional badminton, officially becoming the World No. 1 pair in the BWF rankings on 29 October 2024. This year was defined by their "big event" temperament, as they captured the historical tournament, the All England Open in March, where they defeated Japan's Matsuyama and Shida in a grueling three-game final to secure Korea's first women's doubles title there in years. They followed this by conquering the Asian Championships in Ningbo, China, ending a 19-year drought for South Korean women's doubles at the continental level. In June, they successfully defended their Indonesia Open title, proving their dominance by defeating Chen and Jia pair in straight games. Although the pair faced a heartbreaking quarter-final exit at the Paris 2024 Olympics, they closed the year with unmatched consistency, winning the Japan Open and won the year-end final tournament, the BWF World Tour Finals in Hangzhou.

Lee and Baek showcased remarkable resilience, capping off the 2025 season they described as "hard-fought" with a historic title defense. In March, they reached the final of the Orleans Masters as the top seeds, losing the final against teammates Kim Hye-jeong and Kong Hee-yong. The pair managed to defend their crown at the BWF World Tour Finals in Hangzhou, China, defeating Yuki Fukushima and Mayu Matsumoto in straight games. A defining moment of this victory was an epic 156-shot marathon rally in the first game, which became a viral sensation and underscored the pair's superior physical fitness. Earlier in October, they secured their first ever Denmark Open title, fighting back from a set down to defeat their compatriots Kim Hye-jeong and Kong Hee-yong.

=== 2026: First World Championships title ===
Lee and Baek capitalized on their good form into the new year by going to the Malaysia Open final, where they lost to Liu Shengshu and Tan Ning in a treacherous and stamina-depleted match. In March, they competed in the All England Open where they lost to Liu and Tan with similar score line as in the Malaysia Open previously. Lee competed in the Uber Cup with the Korean team, which went on to become champions after the team defeating China in the final.

In August, Lee and Baek competed in the 2026 BWF World Championships. In the quarterfinals, they defeated the Indonesian pair of Febriana Dwipuji Kusuma and Meilysa Trias Puspita Sari in straight games. For the next match, the pair struggled early in the first game but eventually found their rhythm to beat Li Yijing and Luo Xumin; and advanced to the final. Their opposition for the final would be the reigning champion and world number 1, Liu Shengshu and Tan Ning. In the first game, Baek and Lee scored the first five points and never trailed along the way, winning by the score of 21–15. Onto the second game, it was a tighter game until Lee and Baek took a commanding lead of 10–5 into the interval. Liu and Tan cut the deficit to 12–13 before Lee and Baek scored five unanswered points to restore the five-point gap. The Korean pair finished the game off with another 21–15 score line and ended the Korean 31-year drought in the women's doubles category since 1995, when Gil Young-ah and Jang Hye-ock won the gold medal.

== Achievements ==
=== World Championships ===
Women's doubles
Year	Venue	Partner	Opponent	Score	Result	Ref.
2014	Ballerup Super Arena, Copenhagen, Denmark	(South Korea) Shin Seung-chan	(China) Tian Qing (China) Zhao Yunlei	13–21, 10–21	Bronze	
2021	Palacio de los Deportes Carolina Marín, Huelva, Spain	(South Korea) Shin Seung-chan	(China) Chen Qingchen (China) Jia Yifan	16–21, 17–21	Silver	
2026	Indira Gandhi Arena, New Delhi, India	(South Korea) Baek Ha-na	(China) Liu Shengshu (China) Tan Ning	21–15, 21–15	Gold	

=== Asian Games ===
Women's doubles
Year	Venue	Partner	Opponent	Score	Result	Ref.
2022	Binjiang Gymnasium, Hangzhou, China	(South Korea) Baek Ha-na	(China) Chen Qingchen (China) Jia Yifan	18–21, 17–21	Silver	
2026	Ichinomiya City Municipal Gymnasium, Ichinomiya, Japan	(South Korea) Baek Ha-na	(China) Liu Shengshu (China) Tan Ning	26–28, 21–18, 21–18	Gold	

=== Asian Championships ===
Women's doubles
Year	Venue	Partner	Opponent	Score	Result	Ref.
2016	Wuhan Sports Center Gymnasium, Wuhan, China	(South Korea) Chang Ye-na	(Japan) Misaki Matsutomo (Japan) Ayaka Takahashi	16–21, 19–21	Bronze	
2017	Wuhan Sports Center Gymnasium, Wuhan, China	(South Korea) Chang Ye-na	(Japan) Misaki Matsutomo (Japan) Ayaka Takahashi	14–21, 10–21	Bronze	
2023	Sheikh Rashid Bin Hamdan Indoor Hall, Dubai, United Arab Emirates	(South Korea) Baek Ha-na	(Japan) Yuki Fukushima (Japan) Sayaka Hirota	7–21, 14–21	Silver	
2024	Ningbo Olympic Sports Center Gymnasium, Ningbo, China	(South Korea) Baek Ha-na	(China) Zhang Shuxian (China) Zheng Yu	23–21, 21–12	Gold	

=== Summer Universiade ===
Women's doubles
Year	Venue	Partner	Opponent	Score	Result	Ref.
2013	Tennis Academy, Kazan, Russia	(South Korea) Shin Seung-chan	(China) Luo Yu (China) Tian Qing	12–21, 17–21	Bronze	
2015	Hwasun Hanium Culture Sports Center, Hwasun, South Korea	(South Korea) Shin Seung-chan	(China) ~~Ou Dongni~~ (China) ~~Yu Xiaohan~~ (disqualified)	21–16, 21–13	Gold	

=== World Junior Championships ===
Girls' doubles
Year	Venue	Partner	Opponent	Score	Result	Ref.
2010	Domo del Code Jalisco, Guadalajara, Mexico	(South Korea) Choi Hye-in	(China) Tang Jinhua (China) Xia Huan	22–20, 13–21, 15–21	Bronze	
2011	Taoyuan Arena, Taoyuan City, Taiwan	(South Korea) Shin Seung-chan	(Indonesia) Shella Devi Aulia (Indonesia) Anggia Shitta Awanda	21–16, 13–21, 21–9	Gold	
2012	Chiba Port Arena, Chiba, Japan	(South Korea) Shin Seung-chan	(China) Huang Yaqiong (China) Yu Xiaohan	21–14, 18–21, 21–18	Gold	

=== Asian Junior Championships ===
Girls' doubles
Year	Venue	Partner	Opponent	Score	Result	Ref.
2012	Gimcheon Indoor Stadium, Gimcheon, South Korea	(South Korea) Shin Seung-chan	(China) Huang Yaqiong (China) Yu Xiaohan	17–21, 21–15, 21–17	Gold	

=== BWF World Tour (12 titles, 17 runners-up) ===
The BWF World Tour, which was announced on 19 March 2017 and implemented in 2018, is a series of elite badminton tournaments sanctioned by the Badminton World Federation (BWF). The BWF World Tour is divided into levels of World Tour Finals, Super 1000, Super 750, Super 500, Super 300, and the BWF Tour Super 100.

Women's doubles
Year	Tournament	Level	Partner	Opponent	Score	Result	Ref.
2018	Fuzhou China Open	Super 750	(South Korea) Shin Seung-chan	(Japan) Mayu Matsumoto (Japan) Wakana Nagahara	23–21, 21–18	(gold) Winner	
2018	Hong Kong Open	Super 500	(South Korea) Shin Seung-chan	(Japan) Yuki Fukushima (Japan) Sayaka Hirota	18–21, 17–21	(silver) Runner-up	
2018	Korea Masters	Super 300	(South Korea) Shin Seung-chan	(South Korea) Chang Ye-na (South Korea) Jung Kyung-eun	14–21, 17–21	(silver) Runner-up	
2018	BWF World Tour Finals	World Tour Finals	(South Korea) Shin Seung-chan	(Japan) Misaki Matsutomo (Japan) Ayaka Takahashi	12–21, 20–22	(silver) Runner-up	
2019	Korea Open	Super 500	(South Korea) Shin Seung-chan	(South Korea) Kim So-yeong (South Korea) Kong Hee-yong	21–13, 19–21, 17–21	(silver) Runner-up	
2019	French Open	Super 750	(South Korea) Shin Seung-chan	(South Korea) Kim So-yeong (South Korea) Kong Hee-yong	16–21, 21–19, 21–12	(gold) Winner	
2019	Fuzhou China Open	Super 750	(South Korea) Shin Seung-chan	(Japan) Yuki Fukushima (Japan) Sayaka Hirota	17–21, 15–21	(silver) Runner-up	
2020 (II)	Thailand Open	Super 1000	(South Korea) Shin Seung-chan	(South Korea) Kim So-yeong (South Korea) Kong Hee-yong	18–21, 19–21	(silver) Runner-up	
2020	BWF World Tour Finals	World Tour Finals	(South Korea) Shin Seung-chan	(South Korea) Kim So-yeong (South Korea) Kong Hee-yong	15–21, 26–24, 21–19	(gold) Winner	
2021	Denmark Open	Super 1000	(South Korea) Shin Seung-chan	(China) Huang Dongping (China) Zheng Yu	15–21, 17–21	(silver) Runner-up	
2021	French Open	Super 750	(South Korea) Shin Seung-chan	(South Korea) Kim So-yeong (South Korea) Kong Hee-yong	21–17, 21–12	(gold) Winner	
2022	Denmark Open	Super 750	(South Korea) Baek Ha-na	(China) Chen Qingchen (China) Jia Yifan	12–21, 15–21	(silver) Runner-up	
2023	Thailand Masters	Super 300	(South Korea) Baek Ha-na	(Thailand) Benyapa Aimsaard (Thailand) Nuntakarn Aimsaard	6–21, 11–21	(silver) Runner-up	
2023	German Open	Super 300	(South Korea) Baek Ha-na	(Japan) Nami Matsuyama (Japan) Chiharu Shida	21–19, 21–15	(gold) Winner	
2023	All England Open	Super 1000	(South Korea) Baek Ha-na	(South Korea) Kim So-yeong (South Korea) Kong Hee-yong	5–21, 12–21	(silver) Runner-up	
2023	Malaysia Masters	Super 500	(South Korea) Baek Ha-na	(Malaysia) Pearly Tan (Malaysia) Thinaah Muralitharan	22–20, 8–21, 21–17	(gold) Winner	
2023	Singapore Open	Super 750	(South Korea) Baek Ha-na	(China) Chen Qingchen (China) Jia Yifan	16–21, 12–21	(silver) Runner-up	
2023	Indonesia Open	Super 1000	(South Korea) Baek Ha-na	(Japan) Yuki Fukushima (Japan) Sayaka Hirota	22–20, 21–10	(gold) Winner	
2023	China Open	Super 1000	(South Korea) Baek Ha-na	(China) Chen Qingchen (China) Jia Yifan	11–21, 17–21	(silver) Runner-up	
2023	BWF World Tour Finals	World Tour Finals	(South Korea) Baek Ha-na	(China) Chen Qingchen (China) Jia Yifan	16–21, 16–21	(silver) Runner-up	
2024	All England Open	Super 1000	(South Korea) Baek Ha-na	(Japan) Nami Matsuyama (Japan) Chiharu Shida	21–19, 11–21, 21–17	(gold) Winner	
2024	Indonesia Open	Super 1000	(South Korea) Baek Ha-na	(China) Chen Qingchen (China) Jia Yifan	21–17, 21–13	(gold) Winner	
2024	Japan Open	Super 750	(South Korea) Baek Ha-na	(China) Liu Shengshu (China) Tang Ning	18–21, 20–22	(silver) Runner-up	
2024	BWF World Tour Finals	World Tour Finals	(South Korea) Baek Ha-na	(Japan) Nami Matsuyama (Japan) Chiharu Shida	21–19, 21–14	(gold) Winner	
2025	Orléans Masters	Super 300	(South Korea) Baek Ha-na	(South Korea) Kim Hye-jeong (South Korea) Kong Hee-yong	18–21, 21–23	(silver) Runner-up	
2025	Denmark Open	Super 750	(South Korea) Baek Ha-na	(South Korea) Kim Hye-jeong (South Korea) Kong Hee-yong	15–21, 21–14, 21–15	(gold) Winner	
2025	BWF World Tour Finals	World Tour Finals	(South Korea) Baek Ha-na	(Japan) Yuki Fukushima (Japan) Mayu Matsumoto	21–17, 21–11	(gold) Winner	
2026	Malaysia Open	Super 1000	(South Korea) Baek Ha-na	(China) Liu Shengshu (China) Tan Ning	18–21, 12–21	(silver) Runner-up	
2026	All England Open	Super 1000	(South Korea) Baek Ha-na	(China) Liu Shengshu (China) Tan Ning	18–21, 12–21	(silver) Runner-up	

=== BWF Superseries (3 titles, 6 runners-up) ===
The BWF Superseries, which was launched on 14 December 2006 and implemented in 2007, was a series of elite badminton tournaments, sanctioned by the Badminton World Federation (BWF). BWF Superseries levels were Superseries and Superseries Premier. A season of Superseries consisted of twelve tournaments around the world that had been introduced since 2011. Successful players were invited to the Superseries Finals, which were held at the end of each year.

Women's doubles
Year	Tournament	Partner	Opponent	Score	Result	Ref.
2015	Korea Open	(South Korea) Chang Ye-na	(Indonesia) Nitya Krishinda Maheswari (Indonesia) Greysia Polii	15–21, 18–21	(silver) Runner-up	
2016	French Open	(South Korea) Chang Ye-na	(China) Chen Qingchen (China) Jia Yifan	16–21, 17–21	(silver) Runner-up	
2016	China Open	(South Korea) Chang Ye-na	(China) Huang Dongping (China) Li Yinhui	13–21, 21–14, 21–17	(gold) Winner	
2017	All England Open	(South Korea) Chang Ye-na	(Denmark) Christinna Pedersen (Denmark) Kamilla Rytter Juhl	21–18, 21–13	(gold) Winner	
2017	Indonesia Open	(South Korea) Chang Ye-na	(China) Chen Qingchen (China) Jia Yifan	19–21, 21–15, 10–21	(silver) Runner-up	
2017	Korea Open	(South Korea) Chang Ye-na	(China) Huang Yaqiong (China) Yu Xiaohan	11–21, 15–21	(silver) Runner-up	
2017	Denmark Open	(South Korea) Shin Seung-chan	(Japan) Shiho Tanaka (Japan) Koharu Yonemoto	21–13, 21–16	(gold) Winner	
2017	French Open	(South Korea) Shin Seung-chan	(Indonesia) Greysia Polii (Indonesia) Apriyani Rahayu	17–21, 15–21	(silver) Runner-up	
2017	China Open	(South Korea) Kim Hye-rin	(China) Chen Qingchen (China) Jia Yifan	7–21, 21–18, 14–21	(silver) Runner-up	

BWF Super Series Premier tournament
BWF Super Series tournament

=== BWF Grand Prix (5 titles, 6 runners-up) ===
The BWF Grand Prix had two levels, the Grand Prix and Grand Prix Gold. It was a series of badminton tournaments sanctioned by the Badminton World Federation (BWF) and played between 2007 and 2017.

Women's doubles
Year	Tournament	Partner	Opponent	Score	Result	Ref.
2012	Korea Grand Prix Gold	(South Korea) Shin Seung-chan	(South Korea) Eom Hye-won (South Korea) Jang Ye-na	13–21, 17–21	(silver) Runner-up	
2013	Swiss Open	(South Korea) Shin Seung-chan	(South Korea) Jung Kyung-eun (South Korea) Kim Ha-na	21–23, 16–21	(silver) Runner-up	
2013	Chinese Taipei Open	(South Korea) Shin Seung-chan	(South Korea) Jung Kyung-eun (South Korea) Kim Ha-na	Walkover	(silver) Runner-up	
2014	Canada Open	(South Korea) Choi Hye-in	(South Korea) Park So-young (South Korea) Park Sun-young	21–15, 21–18	(gold) Winner	
2014	Korea Grand Prix	(South Korea) Shin Seung-chan	(South Korea) Chang Ye-na (South Korea) Yoo Hae-won	15–8 retired	(gold) Winner	
2015	Thailand Open	(South Korea) Chang Ye-na	(China) Huang Dongping (China) Li Yinhui	22–20, 11–21, 15–21	(silver) Runner-up	
2015	Korea Masters	(South Korea) Chang Ye-na	(South Korea) Jung Kyung-eun (South Korea) Shin Seung-chan	21–7, 16–21, 21–19	(gold) Winner	
2015	U.S. Grand Prix	(South Korea) Chang Ye-na	(South Korea) Jung Kyung-eun (South Korea) Shin Seung-chan	22–24, 21–18, 12–21	(silver) Runner-up	
2016	New Zealand Open	(South Korea) Chang Ye-na	(Japan) Yuki Fukushima (Japan) Sayaka Hirota	13–21, 16–21	(silver) Runner-up	
2017	U.S. Open	(South Korea) Shin Seung-chan	(Japan) Mayu Matsumoto (Japan) Wakana Nagahara	21–16, 21–13	(gold) Winner	
2017	Korea Masters	(South Korea) Shin Seung-chan	(South Korea) Kim So-yeong (South Korea) Kong Hee-yong	21–18, 23–21	(gold) Winner	

BWF Grand Prix Gold tournament
BWF Grand Prix tournament

=== BWF International Challenge/Series (2 titles, 1 runner-up) ===
Women's doubles
Year	Tournament	Partner	Opponent	Score	Result	Ref.
2012	Iceland International	(South Korea) Shin Seung-chan	(South Korea) Go Ah-ra (South Korea) Yoo Hae-won	21–18, 21–16	(gold) Winner	
2012	India International	(South Korea) Shin Seung-chan	(India) Aparna Balan (India) N. Sikki Reddy	19–21, 21–13, 21–17	(gold) Winner	

Mixed doubles
Year	Tournament	Partner	Opponent	Score	Result	Ref.
2011	Turkey International	(South Korea) Kim Sa-rang	(South Korea) Cho Gun-woo (South Korea) Yoo Hyun-young	25–23, 9–21, 19–21	(silver) Runner-up	

BWF International Challenge tournament
BWF International Series tournament
BWF Future Series tournament
