= Han So-yeon =

South Korean badminton player (born 1995)

Personal information
- Born: 18 April 1995 (age 31)
- Height: 1.78 m (5 ft 10 in)

Sport
- Country: South Korea
- Sport: Badminton

Women's singles & doubles
- Highest ranking: 351 (WS 7 April 2016); 217 (WD 7 June 2012)
- BWF profile
Medal record
Women's badminton
Representing South Korea
World Junior Championships
Silver medal – second place	2011 Taipei	Mixed team
Bronze medal – third place	2011 Taipei	Girls' doubles

Han So-yeon (Korean: 한소연; born 18 April 1995) is a South Korean badminton player. She was selected to join the Korea national badminton team in 2015.

== Achievements ==
=== BWF World Junior Championships ===
Girls' doubles
Year	Venue	Partner	Opponent	Score	Result
2011	Taoyuan Arena; Taoyuan City, Taipei, Chinese Taipei	(South Korea) Kim Hyo-min	(Indonesia) Shella Devi Aulia (Indonesia) Anggia Shitta Awanda	13–21, 20–22	Bronze

=== BWF International Challenge/Series ===
Women's singles
Year	Tournament	Opponent	Score	Result
2017	Mongolia International	(Vietnam) Nguyen Thuy Linh	18–21, 9–21	(silver) Runner-up

Women's doubles
Year	Tournament	Partner	Opponent	Score	Result
2017	Mongolia International	(South Korea) Ko Hye-ryeon	(Mongolia) Khaliunaa Byambaa (Mongolia) Tegshzaya Choinkhor	21–16, 21–19	(gold) Winner

BWF International Challenge tournament
BWF International Series tournament
