= 2012 BWF World Junior Championships – Girls doubles =

The Girls doubles tournament of the 2012 BWF World Junior Championships was held from October 30 until November 3. Lee So-hee and Shin Seung-chan from South Korea were the defending champion. This year, they defend their title after beating Chinese pair Huang Yaqiong and Yu Xiaohan 21–14, 18–21, 21–18 in the final.

== Seeded ==
1. (Bulgaria) Gabriela Stoeva / Stefani Stoeva (quarter-final)
2. (South Korea) Lee So-hee / Shin Seung-chan (champion)
3. (Indonesia) Shella Devi Aulia / Anggia Shitta Awanda (second round)
4. (Malaysia) Chow Mei Kuan / Lee Meng Yean (semi-final)
5. (China) Chen Qingchen / Huang Dongping (quarter-final)
6. (Chinese Taipei) Chen Szu-yu / Chen Ting-yi (third round)
7. (Indonesia) Melati Daeva Oktavianti / Rosyita Eka Putri Sari (quarter-final)
8. (China) Yu Xiaohan / Huang Yaqiong (final)

== Draw ==
=== Finals ===
Quarterfinals
1	(Bulgaria) Gabriela Stoeva (Bulgaria) Stefani Stoeva	14	11
5/8	(China) Yu Xiaohan (China) Huang Yaqiong	21	21
(Japan) Chisato Hoshi (Japan) Ayako Sakuramoto	17	21	19
(South Korea) Kim Hyo-min (South Korea) Lee Min-ji	21	8	21
5/8	(Indonesia) Melati Daeva Oktavianti (Indonesia) Rosyita Eka Putri Sari	18	21	12
3/4	(Malaysia) Chow Mei Kuan (Malaysia) Lee Meng Yean	21	14	21
5/8	(China) Chen Qingchen (China) Huang Dongping	21	14	20
2	(South Korea) Lee So-hee (South Korea) Shin Seung-chan	16	21	22

Semifinals
5/8	(China) Yu Xiaohan (China) Huang Yaqiong	21	21
(South Korea) Kim Hyo-min (South Korea) Lee Min-ji	12	7
3/4	(Malaysia) Chow Mei Kuan (Malaysia) Lee Meng Yean	6	12
2	(South Korea) Lee So-hee (South Korea) Shin Seung-chan	21	21

Final
5/8	(China) Yu Xiaohan (China) Huang Yaqiong	14	21	18
2	(South Korea) Lee So-hee (South Korea) Shin Seung-chan	21	18	21

=== Top Half ===
==== Section 1 ====
First Round
1	(Bulgaria) G Stoeva (Bulgaria) S Stoeva
BYE
(England) J Moore (England) V Williams	21	21
(Australia) V Kessler (Australia) N Sharp	14	18
(South Africa) L de Wet (South Africa) A Schoonees	4	8
(Malaysia) J Choong (Malaysia) Yap CW	21	21
(France) D Lansac (France) A Tran	21	21
(United States) C Chen (United States) J Lin	8	12

Second Round
1	(Bulgaria) G Stoeva (Bulgaria) S Stoeva	21	21
(England) J Moore (England) V Williams	13	6
(Malaysia) J Choong (Malaysia) Yap CW	21	21
(France) D Lansac (France) A Tran	13	9

Third Round
1	(Bulgaria) G Stoeva (Bulgaria) S Stoeva	22	21
(Malaysia) J Choong (Malaysia) Yap CW	20	15

==== Section 2 ====
First Round
5/8	(China) Yu XH (China) Huang YQ	22	21	21
(South Korea) Chae Y-j (South Korea) Kim J-w	24	15	12
(Belgium) M Demy (Belgium) S van Wel	10	9
(Japan) M Nakamura (Japan) A Ohori	21	21
(India) R Gadde (India) P Ram	16	19
(Thailand) P Chochuwong (Thailand) A Sapniti	21	21
(Indonesia) M Giovani (Indonesia) N Istirani	21	21
(Netherlands) A Chen (Netherlands) K van der Valk	13	6

Second Round
5/8	(China) Yu XH (China) Huang YQ	21	21
(Japan) M Nakamura (Japan) A Ohori	9	10
(Thailand) P Chochuwong (Thailand) A Sapniti	15	12
(Indonesia) M Giovani (Indonesia) N Istirani	21	21

Third Round
5/8	(China) Yu XH (China) Huang YQ	21	21
(Indonesia) M Giovani (Indonesia) N Istirani	17	10

==== Section 3 ====
First Round
3/4	(Indonesia) S Aulia (Indonesia) A Awanda
BYE
(Uzbekistan) D Ahmedova (Uzbekistan) M Pakina	5	7
(Japan) C Hoshi (Japan) A Sakuramoto	21	21
(Thailand) L Narissapat (Thailand) P Supajirakul	21	21
(Canada) T Wang (Canada) J Wu	8	14
(Malaysia) Cheah YS (Malaysia) Chin KM	21	15	18
(Singapore) Chong FJ (Singapore) F Seah	16	21	21

Second Round
3/4	(Indonesia) S Aulia (Indonesia) A Awanda	18	21	16
(Japan) C Hoshi (Japan) A Sakuramoto	21	14	21
(Thailand) L Narissapat (Thailand) P Supajirakul	21	21
(Singapore) Chong FJ (Singapore) F Seah	8	14

Third Round
(Japan) C Hoshi (Japan) A Sakuramoto	14	21	21
(Thailand) L Narissapat (Thailand) P Supajirakul	21	19	18

==== Section 4 ====
First Round
5/8	(Chinese Taipei) Chen S-y (Chinese Taipei) Chen T-y	21	21
(Philippines) A Leonardo (Philippines) T Pomar	11	7
(Hong Kong) Cheung YM (Hong Kong) Yuen SY	21	21
(Germany) L Kaepplein (Germany) J Karnott	15	15
(Sri Lanka) M Fonseka (Sri Lanka) P Pasqual	13	7
(Denmark) S Jensen (Denmark) A Madsen	21	21
(South Korea) Kim H-m (South Korea) Lee M-j	21	21
(Turkey) C Fere (Turkey) E Yazgan	15	13

Second Round
5/8	(Chinese Taipei) Chen S-y (Chinese Taipei) Chen T-y	12	22	21
(Hong Kong) Cheung YM (Hong Kong) Yuen SY	21	20	19
(Denmark) S Jensen (Denmark) A Madsen	8	17
(South Korea) Kim H-m (South Korea) Lee M-j	21	21

Third Round
5/8	(Chinese Taipei) Chen S-y (Chinese Taipei) Chen T-y	16	10
(South Korea) Kim H-m (South Korea) Lee M-j	21	21

=== Bottom Half ===
==== Section 5 ====
First Round
(Japan) S Hayata (Japan) A Watanabe	21	21
(Belgium) I Lanckriet (Belgium) F Vandenhoucke	14	8
(Vietnam) Le TH (Vietnam) Pham NT	19	21	21
(Singapore) E Chua (Singapore) Yeo JM	21	15	13
(Chinese Taipei) Chang C-h (Chinese Taipei) Chang H-t	21	21
(South Africa) D Botha (South Africa) J van der Vyver	10	6
(Russia) O Morozova (Russia) N Rogova	23	13
5/8	(Indonesia) M Oktavianti (Indonesia) R Putri Sari	25	21

Second Round
(Japan) S Hayata (Japan) A Watanabe	21	26
(Vietnam) Le TH (Vietnam) Pham NT	18	24
(Chinese Taipei) Chang C-h (Chinese Taipei) Chang H-t	10	17
5/8	(Indonesia) M Oktavianti (Indonesia) R Putri Sari	21	21

Third Round
(Japan) S Hayata (Japan) A Watanabe	19	18
5/8	(Indonesia) M Oktavianti (Indonesia) R Putri Sari	21	21

==== Section 6 ====
First Round
(France) M Batomene (France) S Guerin	21	16	18
(Netherlands) M Halkema (Netherlands) M Sibbald	16	21	21
(Philippines) A Montilla (Philippines) K Salatan	11	19
(Hong Kong) Tsang WC (Hong Kong) Ng WY	21	21
(Bulgaria) M Ivanova (Bulgaria) M Mitsova	21	21
(Czech Republic) M Svetnickova (Czech Republic) I Zychova	12	8
3/4	(Malaysia) Chow MK (Malaysia) Lee MY

Second Round
(Netherlands) M Halkema (Netherlands) M Sibbald	11	21	21
(Hong Kong) Tsang WC (Hong Kong) Ng WY	21	9	16
(Bulgaria) M Ivanova (Bulgaria) M Mitsova	15	9
3/4	(Malaysia) Chow MK (Malaysia) Lee MY	21	21

Third Round
(Netherlands) M Halkema (Netherlands) M Sibbald	11	8
3/4	(Malaysia) Chow MK (Malaysia) Lee MY	21	21

==== Section 7 ====
First Round
(United States) A Lin (United States) L Wen	5	8
(Thailand) P Chochuwong (Thailand) C Teachavorasinskun	21	21
(Republic of Ireland) R Darragh (Republic of Ireland) A Stephenson	13	7
(Chinese Taipei) Chang Y-h (Chinese Taipei) Shih Y-c	21	21
(Canada) A Holcek (Canada) C Tsai	18	13
(Germany) A Dorr (Germany) F Volkmann	21	21
(India) M Jakkampudi (India) M Kukkapalli	9	15
5/8	(China) Chen QC (China) Huang DP	21	21

Second Round
(Thailand) P Chochuwong (Thailand) C Teachavorasinskun	21	16	21
(Chinese Taipei) Chang Y-h (Chinese Taipei) Shih Y-c	12	21	14
(Germany) A Dorr (Germany) F Volkmann	10	11
5/8	(China) Chen QC (China) Huang DP	21	21

Third Round
(Thailand) P Chochuwong (Thailand) C Teachavorasinskun	15	14
5/8	(China) Chen QC (China) Huang DP	21	21

==== Section 8 ====
First Round
(England) C Birch (England) H Smith	21	21
(Ukraine) A Dmytryshyn (Ukraine) D Samarchants	16	4
(Sri Lanka) K Waduthantri (Sri Lanka) Y Dayarathne	13	5
(Australia) J Guan (Australia) G Somerville	21	21
(Finland) M Lindholm (Finland) J Nyström	18	21	23
(Turkey) B Korkmaz (Turkey) O Toyran	21	9	21
BYE
2	(South Korea) Lee S-h (South Korea) Shin S-c

Second Round
(England) C Birch (England) H Smith	21	21
(Australia) J Guan (Australia) G Somerville	17	16
(Finland) M Lindholm (Finland) J Nyström	9	8
2	(South Korea) Lee S-h (South Korea) Shin S-c	21	21

Third Round
(England) C Birch (England) H Smith	9	8
2	(South Korea) Lee S-h (South Korea) Shin S-c	21	21
