= Kim Hyo-min =

South Korean badminton player (born 1995)

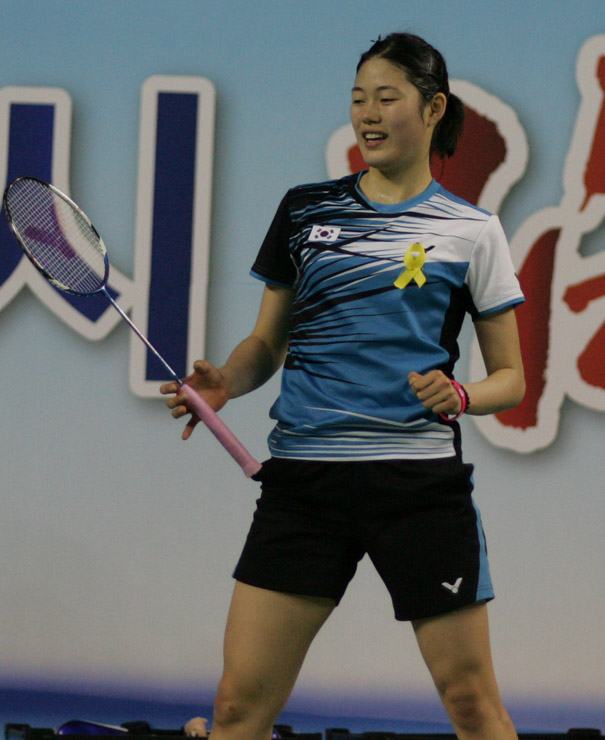
- Kim Hyo Min at the 2014 Badminton Asia Championships

Personal information
- Born: 8 December 1995 (age 30) Ulsan, South Korea
- Height: 1.65 m (5 ft 5 in)
- Weight: 50 kg (110 lb)

Sport
- Country: South Korea
- Sport: Badminton
- Handedness: Right

Women's singles
- Highest ranking: 22 (28 June 2016)
- Current ranking: 68 (9 August 2022)
- BWF profile
Medal record
Women's badminton
Representing South Korea
Uber Cup
Silver medal – second place	2016 Kunshan	Women's team
Bronze medal – third place	2014 New Delhi	Women's team
Asian Games
Silver medal – second place	2014 Incheon	Women's team
Asia Team Championships
Bronze medal – third place	2016 Hyderabad	Women's team
Summer Universiade
Gold medal – first place	2015 Gwangju	Mixed team
World Junior Championships
Gold medal – first place	2013 Bangkok	Mixed team
Silver medal – second place	2011 Taipei	Mixed team
Bronze medal – third place	2011 Taipei	Girls' doubles
Bronze medal – third place	2012 Chiba	Girls' doubles
Bronze medal – third place	2012 Chiba	Mixed team
Asian Junior Championships
Silver medal – second place	2013 Kota Kinabalu	Mixed team
Bronze medal – third place	2012 Gimcheon	Mixed team

- Kim Hyo-min
- Hangul: 김효민
- Hanja: 金效旻
- RR: Gim Hyomin
- MR: Kim Hyomin

Kim Hyo-min (born 8 December 1995) is a South Korean badminton player. Although she now specializes in singles, Kim's first big result in a major international junior event came when she and fellow singles specialist Lee Min-ji reached the girls' doubles semi-finals at the 2012 World Junior Championships. The following year, she was undefeated in South Korea's run to winning the Suhandinata Cup at the 2013 World Junior Championships. In 2014, Kim beat Sun Yu to reach the final of the 2014 Macau Open Grand Prix Gold, and she became the runner-up after being defeated by P. V. Sindhu in the final round.

== Achievements ==
=== BWF World Junior Championships ===
Girls' doubles
Year	Venue	Partner	Opponent	Score	Result
2011	Taoyuan Arena; Taoyuan City, Taipei, Taiwan	(South Korea) Han So-yeon	(Indonesia) Shella Devi Aulia (Indonesia) Anggia Shitta Awanda	13–21, 20–22	Bronze
2012	Chiba Port Arena; Chiba, Japan	(South Korea) Lee Min-ji	(China) Huang Yaqiong (China) Yu Xiaohan	12–21, 7–21	Bronze

=== BWF Grand Prix ===
The BWF Grand Prix had two levels, the Grand Prix and Grand Prix Gold. It was a series of badminton tournaments sanctioned by the Badminton World Federation (BWF) and played between 2007 and 2017.

Women's singles
Year	Tournament	Opponent	Score	Result
2014	Macau Open	(India) P. V. Sindhu	12–21, 17–21	(silver) Runner-up
2015	Chinese Taipei Masters	(South Korea) Lee Jang-mi	16–21, 16–21	(silver) Runner-up

BWF Grand Prix Gold tournament
BWF Grand Prix tournament

=== BWF International Challenge/Series ===
Women's singles
Year	Tournament	Opponent	Score	Result
2012	Scottish International	(Japan) Sayaka Takahashi	6–21, 8–21	(silver) Runner-up
2015	Thailand International	(Thailand) Supanida Katethong	16–21, 16–21	(silver) Runner-up

BWF International Challenge tournament
BWF International Series tournament
