= Dian Fitriani =

Indonesian badminton player (born 1993)

Personal information
- Born: 21 March 1993 (age 33) Magelang, Central Java, Indonesia

Sport
- Country: Indonesia
- Sport: Badminton
- Handedness: Right

Women's singles & doubles
- Highest ranking: 246 (WS 17 May 2012); 31 (WD with Nadya Melati 18 June 2015; 225 (XD 15 September 2016)
- BWF profile

Dian Fitriani (born 21 March 1993) is an Indonesian badminton player, affiliated with Pertamina Fastron. She competed in the junior event with Jaya Raya Jakarta club.

== Achievements ==
=== ASEAN University Games ===
Women's doubles
Year	Venue	Partner	Opponent	Score	Result	Ref.
2012	Gymnasium I, Vientiane, Laos	(Indonesia) Aris Budiharti	(Thailand) Patchanut Krajangjit (Thailand) Preeyaporn Wetsuwannapat	22–24, 21–9, 21–9	Gold	
2016	Singapore Institute of Management Sports Hall; Singapore	(Indonesia) Aris Budiharti	(Indonesia) Mega Cahya Purnama (Indonesia) Sri Wulansari	walkover	Bronze	

Mixed doubles
Year	Venue	Partner	Opponent	Score	Result	Ref.
2012	Gymnasium I, Vientiane, Laos	(Indonesia) Ariyanto Haryadi Putra	(Malaysia) Mohd Razif (Malaysia) Choong Sok Chin	23–25, 17–21	Silver	
2016	Singapore Institute of Management Sports Hall; Singapore	(Indonesia) Agripina Prima Rahmanto Putra	(Indonesia) Rian Swastedian (Indonesia) Aris Budiharti	21–17, 21–13	Gold	

=== BWF International Challenge/Series (1 title, 2 runners-up) ===
Women's doubles
Year	Tournament	Partner	Opponent	Score	Result	Ref.
2014	USM Indonesia International	(Indonesia) Nadya Melati	(Indonesia) Komala Dewi (Indonesia) Meiliana Jauhari	14–21, 21–12, 21–17	(gold) Winner	
2016	Indonesia International	(Indonesia) Nadya Melati	(Indonesia) Apriani Rahayu (Indonesia) Jauza Fadhila Sugiarto	21–12, 18–21, 20–22	(silver) Runner-up	
2017	Indonesia International	(Indonesia) Nadya Melati	(Malaysia) Soong Fie Cho (Malaysia) Tee Jing Yi	16–21, 21–16, 19–21	(silver) Runner-up	

BWF International Challenge tournament
BWF International Series tournament
BWF Future Series tournament

=== BWF Junior International (4 titles, 1 runner-up) ===
Girls' doubles
Year	Tournament	Partner	Opponent	Score	Result	Ref.
2009	Indonesia Junior International	(Indonesia) Ery Octaviani	(Indonesia) Della Destiara Haris (Indonesia) Gebby Ristiyani Imawan	14–21, 24–26	(silver) Runner-up	
2009	Singapore Youth International	(Indonesia) Ery Octaviani	(Chinese Taipei) Lee Fang-yu (Chinese Taipei) Wu Yu-lun	21–18, 21–15	(gold) Winner	
2010	Indonesia Junior International	(Indonesia) Aris Budiharti	(Indonesia) Deariska Putri Medita (Indonesia) Gloria Emanuelle Widjaja	21–17, 14–21, 21–16	(gold) Winner	
2010	Singapore Youth International	(Indonesia) Aris Budiharti	(Hong Kong) Cheung Ngan Yi (Hong Kong) Yeung Yik Kei	22–20, 18–21, 21–17	(gold) Winner	
2011	Indonesia Junior International	(Indonesia) Aris Budiharti	(Indonesia) Anggia Shitta Awanda (Indonesia) Shela Devi Aulia	22–20, 21–18	(gold) Winner	

BWF Junior International Grand Prix tournament
BWF Junior International Challenge tournament
BWF Junior International Series tournament
BWF Junior Future Series tournament

== Performance timeline ==
=== Individual competitions ===
- Senior level

Tournament	BWF World Tour		Best
Tournament	2018	2019	Best
Indonesia Masters	R1	R1	R2 (2012, 2014, 2015)
Indonesia Open	R2	A	R2 (2017, 2018)
Indonesia Masters Super 100	R1		R1 (2018)

Tournament	BWF Superseries			Best
Tournament	2015	2016	2017	Best
Indonesia Open	R1	A	R2	R2 (2017)

Tournament	BWF Grand Prix and Grand Prix Gold							Best
Tournament	2011	2012	2013	2014	2015	2016	2017	Best
Indonesian Masters	R1 (WD)	R1 (WD); R2 (XD)	R1 (WD)	R2 (WD)	R2 (WD); R1 (XD)	R1 (WD); R1 (XD)	—N/a	R2 (2012, 2014, 2015)
