= 2016 BWF Grand Prix Gold and Grand Prix =

Badminton Tournament

The 2016 BWF Grand Prix Gold and Grand Prix was the tenth season of the BWF Grand Prix Gold and Grand Prix.

== Schedule ==
Below is the schedule released by Badminton World Federation:

Tour	Official title	Venue	City	Date		Prize money USD	Report
Tour	Official title	Venue	City	Start	Finish	Prize money USD	Report
1	Malaysia Masters Grand Prix Gold	SPICE Arena	Penang	January 19	January 24	120,000	Report
2	(India) Syed Modi International Grand Prix Gold	Babu Banarasi Das Indoor Stadium	Lucknow	January 26	January 31	120,000	Report
3	Thailand Masters Grand Prix Gold	Nimibutr Stadium	Bangkok	February 8	February 13	120,000	Report
4	(Germany) German Open Grand Prix Gold	RWE-Sporthalle	Mulheim an der Ruhr	March 1	March 6	120,000	Report
5	(Switzerland) Swiss Open Grand Prix Gold	St. Jakobshalle	Basel	March 15	March 20	120,000	Report
6	New Zealand Open Grand Prix Gold	North Shore Events Centre	Auckland	March 22	March 27	120,000	Report
7	China Masters Grand Prix Gold	Olympic Sport Center Xincheng Gymnasium	Jiangsu	April 19	April 24	150,000	Report
8	Chinese Taipei Open Grand Prix Gold	Taipei Arena	Taipei	June 28	July 3	200,000	Report
9	Canada Open Grand Prix	Markin MacPhail Centre	Calgary	June 28	July 3	55,000	Report
10	(United States) U.S. Open Grand Prix Gold	Los Angeles Badminton Club	El Monte	July 5	July 10	120,000	Report
11	Vietnam Open Grand Prix	Nguyen Du Stadium	Ho Chi Minh City	July 18	July 24	50,000	Report
12	Brazil Open Grand Prix	Costa Cavalcante	Foz do Iguacu	August 30	September 4	55,000	Report
13	(Indonesia) Indonesian Masters Grand Prix Gold	Balikpapan Sport and Convention Center	Balikpapan	September 6	September 11	120,000	Report
14	Thailand Open Grand Prix Gold	Nimibutr Stadium	Bangkok	October 4	October 9	120,000	Report
15	(Russia) Russian Open Grand Prix	Sport Hall Olympic	Vladivostok	October 4	October 9	55,000	Report
16	Chinese Taipei Masters Grand Prix	Hsin Chuang Gymnasium	Taipei City	October 11	October 16	55,000	Report
17	(Netherlands) Dutch Open Grand Prix	Topsportcentrum	Almere	October 11	October 16	55,000	Report
18	(Germany) Bitburger Open Grand Prix Gold	Saarlandhalle	Saarbrücken	November 1	November 6	120,000	Report
19	(Scotland) Scottish Open Grand Prix	Emirates Arena	Glasgow	November 23	November 27	50,000	Report
20	Macau Open Grand Prix Gold	Tap Seac Multisport Pavilion Macau	Macau	November 29	December 4	120,000	Report
21	(South Korea) Korea Masters Grand Prix Gold	Olympic Memorial Civic Center	Seogwipo	December 6	December 11	120,000	Report

BWF Grand Prix Gold

== Results ==
=== Winners ===
Tour	Men's singles	Women's singles	Men's doubles	Women's doubles	Mixed doubles
Malaysia	(Malaysia) Lee Chong Wei	(India) P. V. Sindhu	(Indonesia) Marcus Fernaldi Gideon (Indonesia) Kevin Sanjaya Sukamuljo	(Japan) Misaki Matsutomo (Japan) Ayaka Takahashi	(China) Zheng Siwei (China) Li Yinhui
India	(India) Srikanth Kidambi	(South Korea) Sung Ji-hyun	(Malaysia) Goh V Shem (Malaysia) Tan Wee Kiong	(South Korea) Jung Kyung-eun (South Korea) Shin Seung-chan	(Indonesia) Praveen Jordan (Indonesia) Debby Susanto
(Thailand) Thai Masters	(South Korea) Lee Hyun-il	(Thailand) Ratchanok Intanon	(Indonesia) Mohammad Ahsan (Indonesia) Hendra Setiawan	(China) Tian Qing (China) Zhao Yunlei	(China) Zheng Siwei (China) Chen Qingchen
Germany	(China) Lin Dan	(China) Li Xuerui	(South Korea) Ko Sung-hyun (South Korea) Shin Baek-cheol	(China) Huang Yaqiong (China) Tang Jinhua	(South Korea) Ko Sung-hyun (South Korea) Kim Ha-na
(Switzerland) Swiss	(India) H. S. Prannoy	(China) He Bingjiao	(Denmark) Kim Astrup (Denmark) Anders Skaarup Rasmussen	(Japan) Shizuka Matsuo (Japan) Mami Naito	(China) Wang Yilyu (China) Chen Qingchen
New Zealand	(China) Huang Yuxiang	(South Korea) Sung Ji-hyun	(South Korea) Ko Sung-hyun (South Korea) Shin Baek-cheol	(Japan) Yuki Fukushima (Japan) Sayaka Hirota	(Malaysia) Chan Peng Soon (Malaysia) Goh Liu Ying
China Masters	(China) Lin Dan	(China) Li Xuerui	(South Korea) Lee Yong-dae (South Korea) Yoo Yeon-seong	(China) Luo Ying (China) Luo Yu	(China) Xu Chen (China) Ma Jin
(Chinese Taipei) Taipei Gold	(Chinese Taipei) Chou Tien-chen	(Chinese Taipei) Tai Tzu-ying	(China) Li Junhui (China) Liu Yuchen	(China) Huang Dongping (China) Zhong Qianxin	(China) Zheng Siwei (China) Chen Qingchen
Canada	(India) B. Sai Praneeth	(Canada) Michelle Li	(India) Manu Attri (India) B. Sumeeth Reddy	(Australia) Setyana Mapasa (Australia) Gronya Somerville	(Vietnam) Do Tuan Duc (Vietnam) Pham Nhu Thao
(United States) U.S. Gold	(South Korea) Lee Hyun-il	(Japan) Ayumi Mine	(Denmark) Mathias Boe (Denmark) Carsten Mogensen	(Japan) Shiho Tanaka (Japan) Koharu Yonemoto	(Japan) Yugo Kobayashi (Japan) Wakana Nagahara
Vietnam	(Hong Kong) Wong Wing Ki	(Singapore) Yeo Jia Min	(Chinese Taipei) Lee Jhe-huei (Chinese Taipei) Lee Yang	(Indonesia) Della Destiara Haris (Indonesia) Rosyita Eka Putri Sari	(Malaysia) Tan Kian Meng (Malaysia) Lai Pei Jing
Brazil	(Malaysia) Zulfadli Zulkiffli	(Spain) Beatriz Corrales	(Germany) Michael Fuchs (Germany) Fabian Holzer	(Germany) Barbara Bellenberg (Germany) Eva Janssens	(India) Pranaav Jerry Chopra (India) N. Sikki Reddy
Indonesia Masters	(China) Shi Yuqi	(Thailand) Busanan Ongbumrungpan	(Indonesia) Wahyu Nayaka (Indonesia) Kevin Sanjaya Sukamuljo	(South Korea) Chae Yoo-jung (South Korea) Kim So-yeong	(Indonesia) Ronald Alexander (Indonesia) Melati Daeva Oktavianti
(Thailand) Thai Open	(Thailand) Tanongsak Saensomboonsuk	(Japan) Aya Ohori	(Indonesia) Berry Angriawan (Indonesia) Rian Agung Saputro	(Thailand) Puttita Supajirakul (Thailand) Sapsiree Taerattanachai	(Malaysia) Tan Kian Meng (Malaysia) Lai Pei Jing
Russia	(Malaysia) Zulfadli Zulkiffli	(India) Gadde Ruthvika Shivani	(Russia) Vladimir Ivanov (Russia) Ivan Sozonov	(Russia) Anastasia Chervyakova (Russia) Olga Morozova	(India) Pranaav Jerry Chopra (India) N. Sikki Reddy
(Chinese Taipei) Taipei Masters	(India) Sourabh Varma	(Japan) Ayumi Mine	(Indonesia) Fajar Alfian (Indonesia) Muhammad Rian Ardianto	(Japan) Yuki Fukushima (Japan) Sayaka Hirota	(Hong Kong) Tang Chun Man (Hong Kong) Tse Ying Suet
Netherlands	(Chinese Taipei) Wang Tzu-wei	(United States) Zhang Beiwen	(Chinese Taipei) Lee Jhe-huei (Chinese Taipei) Lee Yang	(Australia) Setyana Mapasa (Australia) Gronya Somerville	(Denmark) Mathias Christiansen (Denmark) Sara Thygesen
(Germany) Bitburger	(China) Shi Yuqi	(China) He Bingjiao	(Malaysia) Ong Yew Sin (Malaysia) Teo Ee Yi	(China) Chen Qingchen (China) Jia Yifan	(China) Zheng Siwei (China) Chen Qingchen
Scotland	(Denmark) Anders Antonsen	(Denmark) Mette Poulsen	(Denmark) Mathias Christiansen (Denmark) David Daugaard	(Malaysia) Lim Yin Loo (Malaysia) Yap Cheng Wen	(Malaysia) Goh Soon Huat (Malaysia) Shevon Jemie Lai
Macau	(China) Zhao Junpeng	(China) Chen Yufei	(Chinese Taipei) Lee Jhe-huei (Chinese Taipei) Lee Yang	(China) Chen Qingchen (China) Jia Yifan	(China) Zhang Nan (China) Li Yinhui
(South Korea) Korea Masters	(South Korea) Son Wan-ho	(South Korea) Sung Ji-hyun	(South Korea) Kim Jae-hwan (South Korea) Ko Sung-hyun	(South Korea) Jung Kyung-eun (South Korea) Shin Seung-chan	(South Korea) Ko Sung-hyun (South Korea) Kim Ha-na

=== Performance by countries ===
Tabulated below are the Grand Prix performances based on countries. Only countries who have won a title are listed:

S.no	Team	MAS	IND	THA	GER	SUI	NZL	CHN	TPE	CAN	USA	VIE	BRA	INA	THA	RUS	TPE	NED	GER	SCO	MAC	KOR	Total
1	China	1		2	3	2	1	4	3					1					4		4		25
2	Korea		2	1	2		2	1			1			1								5	15
3	Malaysia	1	1				1					1	1		1	1			1	2			10
4	India	1	1			1				2			1			2	1						9
4	Japan	1				1	1				3				1		2						9
5	Indonesia	1	1	1								1		2	1		1						8
6	Denmark					1					1							1		3			6
6	Chinese Taipei								2			1						2			1		6
7	Thailand			1										1	2								4
8	Australia									1								1					2
8	Hong Kong											1					1						2
8	Germany												2										2
8	Russia															2							2
9	Vietnam									1													1
9	Canada									1													1
9	Singapore											1											1
9	Spain												1										1
9	United States																	1					1

== Grand Prix Gold ==
=== Malaysia Masters ===
Category	Winners	Runners-up	Score
Men's singles	(Malaysia) Lee Chong Wei	(Malaysia) Iskandar Zulkarnain Zainuddin	21–18, 21–11
Women's singles	(India) P. V. Sindhu	(Scotland) Kirsty Gilmour	21–15, 21–9
Men's doubles	(Indonesia) Marcus Fernaldi Gideon / Kevin Sanjaya Sukamuljo	(Malaysia) Koo Kien Keat / Tan Boon Heong	18–21, 21–13, 21–18
Women's doubles	(Japan) Misaki Matsutomo / Ayaka Takahashi	(China) Tang Yuanting / Yu Yang	21–18, 22–20
Mixed doubles	(China) Zheng Siwei / Li Yinhui	(Malaysia) Tan Kian Meng / Lai Pei Jing	21–14, 21–19

=== Syed Modi International ===
Category	Winners	Runners-up	Score
Men's singles	(India) Srikanth Kidambi	(China) Huang Yuxiang	21–13, 14–21, 21–14
Women's singles	(South Korea) Sung Ji-hyun	(Japan) Sayaka Sato	12–21, 21–18, 21–18
Men's doubles	(Malaysia) Goh V Shem / Tan Wee Kiong	(India) Pranaav Jerry Chopra / Akshay Dewalkar	14–21, 24–22, 21–8
Women's doubles	(South Korea) Jung Kyung-eun / Shin Seung-chan	(Netherlands) Eefje Muskens / Selena Piek	21–15, 21–13
Mixed doubles	(Indonesia) Praveen Jordan / Debby Susanto	(Thailand) Dechapol Puavaranukroh / Sapsiree Taerattanachai	23–25, 21–9, 21–16

=== Thailand Masters ===
Category	Winners	Runners-up	Score
Men's singles	(South Korea) Lee Hyun-il	(Hong Kong) Hu Yun	21–18, 21–19
Women's singles	(Thailand) Ratchanok Intanon	(China) Sun Yu	21–19, 18–21, 21–17
Men's doubles	(Indonesia) Mohammad Ahsan / Hendra Setiawan	(South Korea) Kim Gi-jung / Kim Sa-rang	12–21, 21–15, 21–12
Women's doubles	(China) Tian Qing / Zhao Yunlei	(China) Tang Yuanting / Yu Yang	11–21, 21–12, 23–21
Mixed doubles	(China) Zheng Siwei / Chen Qingchen	(Malaysia) Chan Peng Soon / Goh Liu Ying	21–17, 21–15

=== German Open ===
Category	Winners	Runners-up	Score
Men's singles	(China) Lin Dan	(Chinese Taipei) Chou Tien-chen	15–21, 21–17, 21–17
Women's singles	(China) Li Xuerui	(China) Wang Shixian	21–14, 21–17
Men's doubles	(South Korea) Ko Sung-hyun / Shin Baek-cheol	(South Korea) Lee Yong-dae / Yoo Yeon-seong	20–22, 21–18, 21–17
Women's doubles	(China) Huang Yaqiong / Tang Jinhua	(Thailand) Puttita Supajirakul / Sapsiree Taerattanachai	21–14, 21–18
Mixed doubles	(South Korea) Ko Sung-hyun / Kim Ha-na	(South Korea) Shin Baek-cheol / Chae Yoo-jung	21–19, 21–12

=== Swiss Open ===
Category	Winners	Runners-up	Score
Men's singles	(India) H. S. Prannoy	(Germany) Marc Zwiebler	21–18, 21–15
Women's singles	(China) He Bingjiao	(China) Wang Yihan	21–16, 21–10
Men's doubles	(Denmark) Kim Astrup / Anders Skaarup Rasmussen	(Chinese Taipei) Lee Sheng-mu / Tsai Chia-hsin	21–8, 21–15
Women's doubles	(Japan) Shizuka Matsuo / Mami Naito	(Japan) Naoko Fukuman / Kurumi Yonao	21–16, 12–21, 21–12
Mixed doubles	(China) Wang Yilyu / Chen Qingchen	(Thailand) Bodin Isara / Savitree Amitrapai	19–21, 21–16, 21–15

=== New Zealand Open ===
Category	Winners	Runners-up	Score
Men's singles	(China) Huang Yuxiang	(Japan) Riichi Takeshita	21–12, 21–17
Women's singles	(South Korea) Sung Ji-hyun	(Japan) Aya Ohori	21–15, 21–17
Men's doubles	(South Korea) Ko Sung-hyun / Shin Baek-cheol	(Indonesia) Angga Pratama / Ricky Karanda Suwardi	21–18, 21–14
Women's doubles	(Japan) Yuki Fukushima / Sayaka Hirota	(South Korea) Chang Ye-na / Lee So-hee	21–13, 21–16
Mixed doubles	(Malaysia) Chan Peng Soon / Goh Liu Ying	(China) Zheng Siwei / Li Yinhui	21–19, 22–20

=== China Masters ===
Category	Winners	Runners-up	Score
Men's singles	(China) Lin Dan	(China) Chen Long	21–17, 23–21
Women's singles	(China) Li Xuerui	(China) Sun Yu	21–16, 19–21, 21–6
Men's doubles	(South Korea) Lee Yong-dae / Yoo Yeon-seong	(South Korea) Kim Gi-jung / Kim Sa-rang	21–17, 21–14
Women's doubles	(China) Luo Ying / Luo Yu	(China) Chen Qingchen / Jia Yifan	16–21, 21–15, 21–18
Mixed doubles	(China) Xu Chen / Ma Jin	(China) Zheng Siwei / Chen Qingchen	21–17, 21–15

=== Chinese Taipei Open ===
Category	Winners	Runners-up	Score
Men's singles	(Chinese Taipei) Chou Tien-chen	(China) Qiao Bin	21–18, 21–17
Women's singles	(Chinese Taipei) Tai Tzu-ying	(China) Wang Shixian	23–21, 21–6
Men's doubles	(China) Li Junhui / Liu Yuchen	(Chinese Taipei) Chen Hung-ling / Wang Chi-lin	21–17, 17–21, 24–22
Women's doubles	(China) Huang Dongping / Zhong Qianxin	(China) Luo Ying / Luo Yu	21–18, 21–16
Mixed doubles	(China) Zheng Siwei / Chen Qingchen	(Malaysia) Tan Kian Meng / Lai Pei Jing	21–13, 21–16

=== U.S Open ===
Category	Winners	Runners-up	Score
Men's singles	(South Korea) Lee Hyun-il	(Japan) Kanta Tsuneyama	24–22, 21–8
Women's singles	(Japan) Ayumi Mine	(Japan) Saena Kawakami	16–21, 21–11, 21–15
Men's doubles	(Denmark) Mathias Boe / Carsten Mogensen	(Japan) Takuro Hoki / Yugo Kobayashi	21–11, 22–20
Women's doubles	(Japan) Shiho Tanaka / Koharu Yonemoto	(Japan) Mayu Matsumoto / Wakana Nagahara	20–22, 21–15, 21–19
Mixed doubles	(Japan) Yugo Kobayashi / Wakana Nagahara	(Poland) Robert Mateusiak / Nadieżda Zięba	21–16, 21–18

=== Indonesian Masters ===
Category	Winners	Runners-up	Score
Men's singles	(China) Shi Yuqi	(China) Huang Yuxiang	21–12, 11–0 retired
Women's singles	(Thailand) Busanan Ongbumrungpan	(Malaysia) Goh Jin Wei	21–15, 21–13
Men's doubles	(Indonesia) Wahyu Nayaka / Kevin Sanjaya Sukamuljo	(China) Han Chengkai / Zhou Haodong	21–16, 21–18
Women's doubles	(South Korea) Chae Yoo-jung / Kim So-yeong	(Thailand) Jongkolphan Kititharakul / Rawinda Prajongjai	21–18, 22–20
Mixed doubles	(Indonesia) Ronald Alexander / Melati Daeva Oktavianti	(Malaysia) Tan Kian Meng / Lai Pei Jing	21–16, 21–17

=== Thailand Open ===
Category	Winners	Runners-up	Score
Men's singles	(Thailand) Tanongsak Saensomboonsuk	(Indonesia) Sony Dwi Kuncoro	21–15, 21–16
Women's singles	(Japan) Aya Ohori	(Thailand) Busanan Ongbumrungpan	25–23, 21–8
Men's doubles	(Indonesia) Berry Angriawan / Rian Agung Saputro	(Japan) Takuto Inoue / Yuki Kaneko	17–21, 21–14, 21–18
Women's doubles	(Thailand) Puttita Supajirakul / Sapsiree Taerattanachai	(Japan) Mayu Matsumoto / Wakana Nagahara	21–12, 21–17
Mixed doubles	(Malaysia) Tan Kian Meng / Lai Pei Jing	(Hong Kong) Tang Chun Man / Tse Ying Suet	21–16, 22–20

=== Bitburger Open ===
Category	Winners	Runners-up	Score
Men's singles	(China) Shi Yuqi	(India) Sourabh Varma	21–19, 22–20
Women's singles	(China) He Bingjiao	(Thailand) Nitchaon Jindapol	21–11, 21–18
Men's doubles	(Malaysia) Ong Yew Sin / Teo Ee Yi	(Germany) Michael Fuchs / Johannes Schoettler	21–16, 21–18
Women's doubles	(China) Chen Qingchen / Jia Yifan	(Thailand) Jongkolphan Kititharakul / Rawinda Prajongjai	21–12, 21–19
Mixed doubles	(China) Zheng Siwei / Chen Qingchen	(England) Chris Adcock / Gabby Adcock	21–16, 23–21

=== Macau Open ===
Category	Winners	Runners-up	Score
Men's singles	(China) Zhao Junpeng	(Chinese Taipei) Chou Tien-chen	21–11, 21–19
Women's singles	(China) Chen Yufei	(China) Chen Xiaoxin	21–13, 21–18
Men's doubles	(Chinese Taipei) Lee Jhe-huei / Lee Yang	(China) Lu Kai / Zhang Nan	17–21, 21–18, 21–19
Women's doubles	(China) Chen Qingchen / Jia Yifan	(Indonesia) Anggia Shitta Awanda / Ni Ketut Mahadewi Istirani	21–15, 21–13
Mixed doubles	(China) Zhang Nan / Li Yinhui	(Hong Kong) Tang Chun Man / Tse Ying Suet	21–19, 21–15

=== Korea Masters ===
Category	Winners	Runners-up	Score
Men's singles	(South Korea) Son Wan-ho	(Malaysia) Liew Daren	21–13, 21–16
Women's singles	(South Korea) Sung Ji-hyun	(South Korea) Lee Jang-mi	21–8, 21–10
Men's doubles	(South Korea) Kim Jae-hwan / Ko Sung-hyun	(Chinese Taipei) Lee Jhe-huei / Lee Yang	21–19, 21–18
Women's doubles	(South Korea) Jung Kyung-eun / Shin Seung-chan	(South Korea) Chae Yoo-jung / Kim So-yeong	21–14, 21–14
Mixed doubles	(South Korea) Ko Sung-hyun / Kim Ha-na	(Thailand) Dechapol Puavaranukroh / Sapsiree Taerattanachai	21–19, 21–16

== Grand Prix ==
=== Canada Open ===
Category	Winners	Runners-up	Score
Men's singles	(India) B. Sai Praneeth	(South Korea) Lee Hyun-il	21–12, 21–10
Women's singles	(Canada) Michelle Li	(United States) Zhang Beiwen	Walkover
Men's doubles	(India) Manu Attri / B. Sumeeth Reddy	(Canada) Adrian Liu / Toby Ng	21–8, 21–14
Women's doubles	(Australia) Setyana Mapasa / Gronya Somerville	(England) Heather Olver / Lauren Smith	21–15, 21–16
Mixed doubles	(Vietnam) Do Tuan Duc / Pham Nhu Thao	(Sweden) Nico Ruponen / Amanda Hogstrom	21–9, 10–21, 21–13

=== Vietnam Open ===
Category	Winners	Runners-up	Score
Men's singles	(Hong Kong) Wong Wing Ki	(Malaysia) Chong Wei Feng	21–12, 14–21, 21–13
Women's singles	(Singapore) Yeo Jia Min	(Japan) Ayumi Mine	21–14, 21–17
Men's doubles	(Chinese Taipei) Lee Jhe-huei / Lee Yang	(Malaysia) Koo Kien Keat / Tan Boon Heong	18–21, 21–14, 21–7
Women's doubles	(Indonesia) Della Destiara Haris / Rosyita Eka Putri Sari	(Indonesia) Tiara Rosalia Nuraidah / Rizki Amelia Pradipta	21–11, 21–15
Mixed doubles	(Malaysia) Tan Kian Meng / Lai Pei Jing	(Indonesia) Alfian Eko Prasetya / Annisa Saufika	21–16, 21–11

=== Brazil Open ===
Category	Winners	Runners-up	Score
Men's singles	(Malaysia) Zulfadli Zulkiffli	(India) Anand Pawar	18–21, 21–11, 21–17
Women's singles	(Spain) Beatriz Corrales	(Finland) Airi Mikkelä	21–13, 21–11
Men's doubles	(Germany) Michael Fuchs / Fabian Holzer	(Germany) Jones Ralfy Jansen / Josche Zurwonne	21–19, 21–18
Women's doubles	(Germany) Barbara Bellenberg / Eva Janssens	(Brazil) Bianca Lima / Naira Vier	21–7, 21–10
Mixed doubles	(India) Pranaav Jerry Chopra / N. Sikki Reddy	(Canada) Toby Ng / Rachel Honderich	21–15, 21–16

=== Russian Open ===
Category	Winners	Runners-up	Score
Men's singles	(Malaysia) Zulfadli Zulkiffli	(India) Siril Verma	16–21, 21–19, 21–10
Women's singles	(India) Ruthvika Gadde	(Russia) Evgeniya Kosetskaya	21–10, 21–13
Men's doubles	(Russia) Vladimir Ivanov / Ivan Sozonov	(Russia) Konstantin Abramov / Alexandr Zinchenko	21–15, 21–14
Women's doubles	(Russia) Anastasia Chervyakova / Olga Morozova	(Russia) Evgeniya Kosetskaya / Ksenia Polikarpova	21–14, 22–20
Mixed doubles	(India) Pranaav Jerry Chopra / N. Sikki Reddy	(Russia) Vladimir Ivanov / Valeria Sorokina	21–17, 21–19

=== Chinese Taipei Masters ===
Category	Winners	Runners-up	Score
Men's singles	(India) Sourabh Varma	(Malaysia) Liew Daren	12–10, 12–10, 3–3 Retired
Women's singles	(Japan) Ayumi Mine	(Japan) Saena Kawakami	12–10, 7–11, 11–9, 12–10
Men's doubles	(Indonesia) Fajar Alfian / M. Rian Ardianto	(Chinese Taipei) Chen Hung-ling / Wang Chi-lin	11–6, 11–6, 11–13, 9–11, 12–10
Women's doubles	(Japan) Yuki Fukushima / Sayaka Hirota	(Japan) Shiho Tanaka / Koharu Yonemoto	12–10, 11–5, 11–7
Mixed doubles	(Hong Kong) Tang Chun Man / Tse Ying Suet	(Japan) Ryota Taohata / Koharu Yonemoto	11–3, 11–7, 14–12

=== Dutch Open ===
Category	Winners	Runners-up	Score
Men's singles	(Chinese Taipei) Wang Tzu-wei	(India) Ajay Jayaram	21–10, 17–21, 21–18
Women's singles	(United States) Zhang Beiwen	(Chinese Taipei) Hsu Ya-ching	21–11, 21–19
Men's doubles	(Chinese Taipei) Lee Jhe-huei / Lee Yang	(Denmark) Mathias Christiansen / David Daugaard	21–17, 21–17
Women's doubles	(Australia) Setyana Mapasa / Gronya Somerville	(Bulgaria) Gabriela Stoeva / Stefani Stoeva	17–21, 21–17, 21–16
Mixed doubles	(Denmark) Mathias Christiansen / Sara Thygesen	(Denmark) Soren Gravholt / Maiken Fruergaard	21–18, 20–22, 21–16

=== Scottish Open ===
Category	Winners	Runners-up	Score
Men's singles	(Denmark) Anders Antonsen	(Malaysia) Soong Joo Ven	22–20, 21–14
Women's singles	(Denmark) Mette Poulsen	(Switzerland) Sabrina Jaquet	21–18, 17–21, 21–14
Men's doubles	(Denmark) Mathias Christiansen / David Daugaard	(Scotland) Adam Hall / (England) Peter Mills	15–21, 21–19, 21–15
Women's doubles	(Malaysia) Lim Yin Loo / Yap Cheng Wen	(Malaysia) Amelia Alicia Anscelly / Teoh Mei Xing	21–17, 21–13
Mixed doubles	(Malaysia) Goh Soon Huat / Shevon Jemie Lai	(India) Pranaav Jerry Chopra / N. Sikki Reddy	13–21, 21–18, 21–16
