= Indonesia Masters =

Annual badminton tournament in Indonesia

- Official website
- Founded: 2010; 16 years ago
- Editions: 16 (2026)
- Location: Jakarta (2026); Indonesia
- Venue: Istora Gelora Bung Karno (2026)
- Prize money: US$500,000 (2026)

Men's
- Draw: 32S / 32D
- Current champions: Alwi Farhan (singles); Goh Sze Fei; Nur Izzuddin (doubles)
- Most singles titles: 2 Anthony Sinisuka Ginting; Anders Antonsen
- Most doubles titles: 4 Marcus Fernaldi Gideon; Kevin Sanjaya Sukamuljo

Women's
- Draw: 32S / 32D
- Current champions: Chen Yufei (singles); Pearly Tan; Thinaah Muralitharan (doubles)
- Most singles titles: 3 Ratchanok Intanon
- Most doubles titles: 3 Misaki Matsutomo; Ayaka Takahashi

Mixed doubles
- Draw: 32
- Current champions: Chen Tang Jie; Toh Ee Wei
- Most titles (male): 5 Zheng Siwei
- Most titles (female): 5 Huang Yaqiong

Super 500
- Arctic Open; Australian Open; Hong Kong Open; Hylo Open; Indonesia Masters; Japan Masters; Korea Open; Malaysia Masters; Thailand Open

Last completed
- 2026 Indonesia Masters

The Indonesia Masters is an annual international badminton tournament held in Indonesia. Formerly known as the Indonesia Open Grand Prix Gold, it has been classified as a Super 500 event on the BWF World Tour since 2018.

== Sponsorships ==
- Bankaltim (Bankaltim Indonesia Open GP Gold, 2011)
- Yonex (Yonex Sunrise Indonesia Open, 2013; Yonex Sunrise Indonesian Masters, 2014–2016)
- Daihatsu (Daihatsu Indonesia Masters, 2018–present)

== Venues and host cities ==
- 2010–2011: Palaran Badminton Sport Arena, Samarinda, East Kalimantan
- 2012: Palembang Sport and Convention Center, Palembang, South Sumatra
- 2013: Among Rogo Sports Hall, Yogyakarta, Special Region of Yogyakarta
- 2014: Jakabaring Sport City, Palembang, South Sumatra
- 2015: Graha Cakrawala Building, State University of Malang Complex, Malang, East Java
- 2016: Balikpapan Sport and Convention Center, Balikpapan, East Kalimantan
- 2018–2020, 2022–present: Istora Gelora Bung Karno, Jakarta
- 2021: Bali International Convention Center, Badung Regency, Bali
Locations of Indonesia Masters host cities

== Winners ==
Year	Men's singles	Women's singles	Men's doubles	Women's doubles	Mixed doubles	Ref
2010	(Indonesia) Taufik Hidayat	(Thailand) Ratchanok Intanon	(Indonesia) Mohammad Ahsan (Indonesia) Bona Septano	(China) Luo Ying (China) Luo Yu	(Indonesia) Tontowi Ahmad (Indonesia) Liliyana Natsir	
2011	(Indonesia) Dionysius Hayom Rumbaka	(China) Chen Xiaojia	(Indonesia) Mohammad Ahsan (Indonesia) Bona Septano	(Malaysia) Vivian Hoo (Malaysia) Woon Khe Wei	(China) He Hanbin (China) Bao Yixin	
2012	(Indonesia) Sony Dwi Kuncoro	(China) Han Li	(South Korea) Kim Gi-jung (South Korea) Kim Sa-rang	(Japan) Misaki Matsutomo (Japan) Ayaka Takahashi	(Indonesia) Tontowi Ahmad (Indonesia) Liliyana Natsir	
2013	(Indonesia) Simon Santoso	(China) Suo Di	(Indonesia) Angga Pratama (Indonesia) Rian Agung Saputro	(China) Luo Ying (China) Luo Yu	(Indonesia) Praveen Jordan (Indonesia) Vita Marissa	
2014	(India) Prannoy H. S.	(Indonesia) Adriyanti Firdasari	(Indonesia) Marcus Fernaldi Gideon (Indonesia) Markis Kido	(Indonesia) Shendy Puspa Irawati (Indonesia) Vita Marissa	(Indonesia) Riky Widianto (Indonesia) Richi Puspita Dili	
2015	(Indonesia) Tommy Sugiarto	(China) He Bingjiao	(Indonesia) Berry Angriawan (Indonesia) Rian Agung Saputro	(China) Tang Yuanting (China) Yu Yang	(Indonesia) Tontowi Ahmad (Indonesia) Liliyana Natsir	
2016	(China) Shi Yuqi	(Thailand) Busanan Ongbamrungphan	(Indonesia) Wahyu Nayaka (Indonesia) Kevin Sanjaya Sukamuljo	(South Korea) Chae Yoo-jung (South Korea) Kim So-yeong	(Indonesia) Ronald Alexander (Indonesia) Melati Daeva Oktavianti	
2017	No competition					
2018	(Indonesia) Anthony Sinisuka Ginting	(Chinese Taipei) Tai Tzu-ying	(Indonesia) Marcus Fernaldi Gideon (Indonesia) Kevin Sanjaya Sukamuljo	(Japan) Misaki Matsutomo (Japan) Ayaka Takahashi	(China) Zheng Siwei (China) Huang Yaqiong	
2019	(Denmark) Anders Antonsen	(India) Saina Nehwal	(Indonesia) Marcus Fernaldi Gideon (Indonesia) Kevin Sanjaya Sukamuljo	(Japan) Misaki Matsutomo (Japan) Ayaka Takahashi	(China) Zheng Siwei (China) Huang Yaqiong	
2020	(Indonesia) Anthony Sinisuka Ginting	(Thailand) Ratchanok Intanon	(Indonesia) Marcus Fernaldi Gideon (Indonesia) Kevin Sanjaya Sukamuljo	(Indonesia) Greysia Polii (Indonesia) Apriyani Rahayu	(China) Zheng Siwei (China) Huang Yaqiong	
2021	(Japan) Kento Momota	(South Korea) An Se-young	(Japan) Takuro Hoki (Japan) Yugo Kobayashi	(Japan) Nami Matsuyama (Japan) Chiharu Shida	(Thailand) Dechapol Puavaranukroh (Thailand) Sapsiree Taerattanachai	
2022	(Denmark) Viktor Axelsen	(China) Chen Yufei	(Indonesia) Fajar Alfian (Indonesia) Muhammad Rian Ardianto	(China) Chen Qingchen (China) Jia Yifan	(China) Zheng Siwei (China) Huang Yaqiong	
2023	(Indonesia) Jonatan Christie	(South Korea) An Se-young	(Indonesia) Leo Rolly Carnando (Indonesia) Daniel Marthin	(China) Liu Shengshu (China) Zhang Shuxian	(China) Feng Yanzhe (China) Huang Dongping	
2024	(Denmark) Anders Antonsen	(China) Wang Zhiyi	(Indonesia) Leo Rolly Carnando (Indonesia) Daniel Marthin	(China) Liu Shengshu (China) Tan Ning	(China) Zheng Siwei (China) Huang Yaqiong	
2025	(Thailand) Kunlavut Vitidsarn	(Thailand) Ratchanok Intanon	(Malaysia) Man Wei Chong (Malaysia) Tee Kai Wun	(South Korea) Kim Hye-jeong (South Korea) Kong Hee-yong	(Japan) Hiroki Midorikawa (Japan) Natsu Saito	
2026	(Indonesia) Alwi Farhan	(China) Chen Yufei	(Malaysia) Goh Sze Fei (Malaysia) Nur Izzuddin	(Malaysia) Pearly Tan (Malaysia) Thinaah Muralitharan	(Malaysia) Chen Tang Jie (Malaysia) Toh Ee Wei	

== Multiple winners ==
Below is the list of the players who won multiple Indonesia Masters title:

Name	MS	WS	MD	WD	XD	Total
(China) Zheng Siwei					5	5
(China) Huang Yaqiong					5	5
(Indonesia) Marcus Fernaldi Gideon			4			4
(Indonesia) Kevin Sanjaya Sukamuljo			4			4
(Indonesia) Tontowi Ahmad					3	3
(Indonesia) Liliyana Natsir					3	3
(Japan) Misaki Matsutomo				3		3
(Japan) Ayaka Takahashi				3		3
(Thailand) Ratchanok Intanon		3				3
(Indonesia) Mohammad Ahsan			2			2
(Indonesia) Bona Septano			2			2
(China) Luo Ying				2		2
(China) Luo Yu				2		2
(Indonesia) Vita Marissa				1	1	2
(Indonesia) Rian Agung Saputro			2			2
(Indonesia) Anthony Sinisuka Ginting	2					2
(South Korea) An Se-young		2				2
(China) Liu Shengshu				2		2
(Denmark) Anders Antonsen	2					2
(Indonesia) Leo Rolly Carnando			2			2
(Indonesia) Daniel Marthin			2			2
(China) Chen Yufei		2				2

== Performance by nations ==
As of the 2026 edition

Pos	Nation	MS	WS	MD	WD	XD	Total
1	Indonesia	9	1	12	2	6	30
2	China	1	7		6	7	21
3	Japan	1		1	4	1	7
4	Thailand	1	4			1	6
5	Malaysia			2	2	1	5
5	South Korea		2	1	2		5
7	Denmark	3					3
8	India	1	1				2
9	Chinese Taipei		1				1
Total		16	16	16	16	16	80

== See also ==
- Indonesia Open
- Indonesia Masters Super 100
- Indonesia International
