= 2016 German Open Grand Prix Gold =

Tournament details
- Dates: 1 – 6 March 2016
- Level: Grand Prix Gold
- Total prize money: US$120,000
- Venue: RWE-Sporthalle
- Location: Mulheim an der Ruhr, Germany

Champions
- Men's singles: (China) Lin Dan
- Women's singles: (China) Li Xuerui
- Men's doubles: (South Korea) Ko Sung-hyun (South Korea) Shin Baek-cheol
- Women's doubles: (China) Huang Yaqiong (China) Tang Jinhua
- Mixed doubles: (South Korea) Ko Sung-hyun (South Korea) Kim Ha-na

The 2016 German Open Grand Prix Gold was the fourth Grand Prix's badminton tournament of the 2016 BWF Grand Prix and Grand Prix Gold. It was the 59th edition of the German Open. The tournament was held at the RWE-Sporthalle in Mulheim an der Ruhr, Germany on 1–6 March 2016 and had a total purse of $120,000.

== Men's singles ==
=== Seeds ===
1. (Denmark) Jan Ø. Jørgensen (semifinals)
2. (China) Lin Dan (champion)
3. (Denmark) Viktor Axelsen (first round)
4. (Chinese Taipei) Chou Tien-chen (final)
5. (China) Tian Houwei (quarterfinals)
6. (India) Srikanth Kidambi (third round)
7. (Indonesia) Tommy Sugiarto (first round)
8. (South Korea) Son Wan-ho (semifinals)
9. (Hong Kong) Hu Yun (third round)
10. (Hong Kong) Wei Nan (quarterfinals)
11. (India) Kashyap Parupalli (third round)
12. (Hong Kong) Ng Ka Long (quarterfinals)
13. (England) Rajiv Ouseph (withdrawn)
14. (Germany) Marc Zwiebler (second round)
15. (South Korea) Lee Dong-keun (third round)
16. (Japan) Sho Sasaki (quarterfinals)

=== Finals ===
Quarterfinals
1	(Denmark) Jan Ø. Jørgensen	21	21
5	(China) Tian Houwei	18	13
4	(Chinese Taipei) Chou Tien-chen	21	14	21
12	(Hong Kong) Ng Ka Long	16	21	14
8	(South Korea) Son Wan-ho	21	21
10	(Hong Kong) Wei Nan	11	12
16	(Japan) Sho Sasaki	16	22	17
2	(China) Lin Dan	21	20	21

Semifinals
1	(Denmark) Jan Ø. Jørgensen	21	14	17
4	(Chinese Taipei) Chou Tien-chen	16	21	21
8	(South Korea) Son Wan-ho	12	13
2	(China) Lin Dan	21	21

Final
4	(Chinese Taipei) Chou Tien-chen	21	17	17
2	(China) Lin Dan	15	21	21

=== Top half ===
==== Section 1 ====
First Round
1	(Denmark) J Ø Jørgensen	21	21
(Singapore) Derek Wong Z L	18	16
(Hong Kong) Wong W K	21	21
PFQ	(Sweden) M Westerback	11	16
15	(South Korea) Lee D-k	21	17	21
(Poland) A Dziolko	18	21	12
(India) S Verma	21	21
(Ukraine) D Zavadsky	9	8

Second Round
1	(Denmark) J Ø Jørgensen	21	22
(Hong Kong) Wong W K	12	20
15	(South Korea) Lee D-k	8	21	21
(India) S Verma	21	19	19

Third Round
1	(Denmark) J Ø Jørgensen	21	21
15	(South Korea) Lee D-k	10	14

==== Section 2 ====
First Round
5	(China) Tian HW	21	21
PFQ	(Sweden) M Borg	17	12
(England) T Penty	21	21
Q5	(Croatia) Z Durkinjak	9	17
14	(Germany) M Zwiebler	21	21
Q7	(India) K Dharmamer	4	14
(Vietnam) Nguyen T M	21	21
(Denmark) J Persson	16	19

Second Round
5	(China) Tian HW	21	21
(England) T Penty	18	14
14	(Germany) M Zwiebler	15	17
(Vietnam) Nguyen T M	21	21

Third Round
5	(China) Tian HW	21
(Vietnam) Nguyen T M	9	^{r}

==== Section 3 ====
First Round
4	(Chinese Taipei) Chou T-c	21	21
PFQ	(Slovenia) A Roj	18	13
(France) B Leverdez	14	10
(Chinese Taipei) Wang T-w	21	21
9	(Hong Kong) Hu Y	22	21
PFQ	(Denmark) K Bruun	20	15
PFQ	(Indonesia) A Pratama	21	21
(Russia) V Malkov	16	17

Second Round
4	(Chinese Taipei) Chou T-c	21	16	21
(Chinese Taipei) Wang T-w	16	21	11
9	(Hong Kong) Hu Y	21	21
PFQ	(Indonesia) A Pratama	11	15

Third Round
4	(Chinese Taipei) Chou T-c	11	21	21
9	(Hong Kong) Hu Y	21	17	19

==== Section 4 ====
First Round
6	(India) S Kidambi	12	21	21
(Japan) T Ueda	21	18	11
PFQ	(Finland) K Lehikoinen	12	11
PFQ	(Netherlands) E Meijs	21	21
12	(Hong Kong) Ng K L	14	21	21
(Lithuania) K Navickas	21	10	13
Q3	(Germany) L Schaenzler	21	11	22
PFQ	(Slovenia) I Utrosa	16	21	20

Second Round
6	(India) S Kidambi	15	21	21
PFQ	(Netherlands) E Meijs	21	6	16
12	(Hong Kong) Ng K L	21	21
Q3	(Germany) L Schaenzler	9	18

Third Round
6	(India) S Kidambi	21	18	18
12	(Hong Kong) Ng K L	18	21	21

=== Bottom half ===
==== Section 5 ====
First Round
Q1	(Republic of Ireland) J Magee	21	21
PFQ	(Bulgaria) B Kisyov	12	14
(Ukraine) A Pochtarev	9	9
11	(India) K Parupalli	21	21
(Poland) M Rogalski	21	12	18
Q4	(Germany) M Weisskirchen	17	21	21
Q6	(Germany) P Discher	9	12
8	(South Korea) Son W-h	21	21

Second Round
Q1	(Republic of Ireland) J Magee	12	11
11	(India) K Parupalli	21	21
Q4	(Germany) M Weisskirchen	8	12
8	(South Korea) Son W-h	21	21

Third Round
11	(India) K Parupalli	12	11^{r}
8	(South Korea) Son W-h	21	16

==== Section 6 ====
First Round
(Germany) D Domke	21	10	5
(Thailand) B Ponsana	10	21	21
(Norway) M Myhre	16	13
10	(Hong Kong) Wei N	21	21
(Czech Republic) P Koukal	18	5
(Finland) E Heino	21	21
(Japan) K Nishimoto	11	21	21
3	(Denmark) V Axelsen	21	12	15

Second Round
(Thailand) B Ponsana	18	21	22
10	(Hong Kong) Wei N	21	19	24
(Finland) E Heino	13	21	22
(Japan) K Nishimoto	21	17	20

Third Round
10	(Hong Kong) Wei N	21	21
(Finland) E Heino	19	16

==== Section 7 ====
First Round
Q2	(Germany) A Roovers	12	17
(Denmark) C L Thomsen	21	21
(Chinese Taipei) Hsu J-h	11	14
16	(Japan) S Sasaki	21	21
(Denmark) E Holst	21	21
Q8	(Germany) P Kaemnitz	8	9
(Belgium) Y Tan	12	21	21
7	(Indonesia) T Sugiarto	21	17	19

Second Round
(Denmark) C L Thomsen	10	21	15
16	(Japan) S Sasaki	21	15	21
(Denmark) E Holst	21	21
(Belgium) Y Tan	16	16

Third Round
16	(Japan) S Sasaki	16	21	22
(Denmark) E Holst	21	11	20

==== Section 8 ====
First Round
(Estonia) R Must	21	26	21
PFQ	(Thailand) P Thongnuam	18	28	16
(France) T Rouxel	21	18	21
PFQ	(Ukraine) V Atrashchenkov	17	21	15
PFQ	(Netherlands) M Caljouw	21	14	21
(Denmark) A Antonsen	14	21	7
(Denmark) R Fladberg	17	11
2	(China) Lin D	21	21

Second Round
(Estonia) R Must	19	21	21
(France) T Rouxel	21	10	9
PFQ	(Netherlands) M Caljouw	20	11
2	(China) Lin D	22	21

Third Round
(Estonia) R Must	17	8
2	(China) Lin D	21	21

== Women's singles ==
=== Seeds ===
1. (Spain) Carolina Marín (withdrawn)
2. (China) Li Xuerui (champion)
3. (South Korea) Sung Ji-hyun (quarterfinals)
4. (China) Wang Shixian (final)
5. (Japan) Nozomi Okuhara (semifinals)
6. (Japan) Akane Yamaguchi (semifinals)
7. (India) P. V. Sindhu (quarterfinals)
8. (Japan) Sayaka Sato (first round)

=== Finals ===
Semifinals
6	(Japan) Akane Yamaguchi	13	21	19
4	(China) Wang Shixian	21	19	21
5	(Japan) Nozomi Okuhara	21	13	13
2	(China) Li Xuerui	15	21	21

Final
4	(China) Wang Shixian	14	17
2	(China) Li Xuerui	21	21

=== Top half ===
==== Section 1 ====
First Round
PFQ	(Singapore) Liang XY	17	18
(Denmark) L Kjaersfeldt	21	21
(United States) Zhang BW	14	21	21
(Thailand) N Jindapol	21	16	16
6	(Japan) A Yamaguchi	21	16	21
Q4	(Republic of Ireland) C Magee	17	21	13
(South Korea) Bae Y-j	18	21	21
(Thailand) P Buranaprasertsuk	21	17	13

Second Round
(Denmark) L Kjaersfeldt	21	21
(United States) Zhang BW	13	19
6	(Japan) A Yamaguchi	22	22
(South Korea) Bae Y-j	20	20

Quarterfinals
(Denmark) L Kjaersfeldt	15	21	16
6	(Japan) A Yamaguchi	21	13	21

==== Section 2 ====
First Round
4	(China) Wang SX	21	21
(Germany) O Konon	16	6
(Indonesia) L Fanetri	21	22	21
(Chinese Taipei) Hsu Y-c	15	24	16
7	(India) P. V. Sindhu	21	21
(United States) R Schafer	11	13
(Canada) M Li	21	21
(Hong Kong) Cheung N Y	17	16

Second Round
4	(China) Wang SX	21	21
(Indonesia) L Fanetri	10	17
7	(India) P. V. Sindhu	21	21
(Canada) M Li	9	17

Quarterfinals
4	(China) Wang SX	21	21
7	(India) P. V. Sindhu	16	18

=== Bottom half ===
==== Section 3 ====
First Round
(Scotland) K Gilmour	14	20
Q2	(Japan) A Ohori	21	22
PFQ	(Czech Republic) K Gavnholt	12	13
5	(Japan) N Okuhara	21	21
Q1	(Ukraine) M Ulitina	10	18
(Hong Kong) Yip P Y	21	21
(Japan) M Mitani	8	12
3	(South Korea) Sung J-h	21	21

Second Round
Q2	(Japan) A Ohori	8	21	16
5	(Japan) N Okuhara	21	16	21
(Hong Kong) Yip P Y	8	17
3	(South Korea) Sung J-h	21	21

Quarterfinals
5	(Japan) N Okuhara	21	21
3	(South Korea) Sung J-h	11	18

==== Section 4 ====
First Round
(Japan) Y Hashimoto	18	21	21
Q3	(Belgium) L Tan	21	15	13
(Chinese Taipei) Pai Y-p	12	21	21
8	(Japan) S Sato	21	16	18
(Indonesia) M F Kusumastuti	14	23	15
(Thailand) B Ongbumrungpan	21	21	21
(Germany) K Schnaase	15	10
2	(China) Li XR	21	21

Second Round
(Japan) Y Hashimoto	21	21
(Chinese Taipei) Pai Y-p	19	17
(Thailand) B Ongbumrungpan	15	12
2	(China) Li XR	21	21

Quarterfinals
(Japan) Y Hashimoto	11	21	14
2	(China) Li XR	21	18	21

== Men's doubles ==
=== Seeds ===
1. (South Korea) Lee Yong-dae / Yoo Yeon-seong (final)
2. (China) Chai Biao / Hong Wei (second round)
3. (Japan) Hiroyuki Endo / Kenichi Hayakawa (semifinals)
4. (South Korea) Kim Gi-jung / Kim Sa-rang (first round)
5. (Denmark) Mads Conrad-Petersen / Mads Pieler Kolding (quarterfinals)
6. (South Korea) Ko Sung-hyun / Shin Baek-cheol (champion)
7. (China) Liu Xiaolong / Qiu Zihan (quarterfinals)
8. (Russia) Vladimir Ivanov / Ivan Sozonov (semifinals)

=== Finals ===
Semifinals
1	(South Korea) Lee Yong-dae (South Korea) Yoo Yeon-seong	21	21
3	(Japan) Hiroyuki Endo (Japan) Kenichi Hayakawa	19	14
8	(Russia) Vladimir Ivanov (Russia) Ivan Sozonov	18	21	21
6	(South Korea) Ko Sung-hyun (South Korea) Shin Baek-cheol	21	18	23

Final
1	(South Korea) Lee Yong-dae (South Korea) Yoo Yeon-seong	22	18	17
6	(South Korea) Ko Sung-hyun (South Korea) Shin Baek-cheol	20	21	21

=== Top half ===
==== Section 1 ====
First Round
1	(South Korea) Lee Y-d (South Korea) Yoo Y-s	21	11
(Germany) M Fuchs (Germany) J Schoettler	11	9^{r}
(England) P Briggs (England) T Wolfenden	17	17
(China) Liu C (China) Lu K	21	21
7	(China) Liu XL (China) Qiu ZH	23	21	21
(Thailand) B Issara (Thailand) N Puangpuapech	25	17	19
(Chinese Taipei) Liao M-c (Chinese Taipei) Tseng M-h	21	21
Q3	(France) B Kersaudy (France) G Mittelheisser	16	11

Second Round
1	(South Korea) Lee Y-d (South Korea) Yoo Y-s	21	21
(China) Liu C (China) Lu K	11	16
7	(China) Liu XL (China) Qiu ZH	21	21
(Chinese Taipei) Liao M-c (Chinese Taipei) Tseng M-h	18	16

Quarterfinals
1	(South Korea) Lee Y-d (South Korea) Yoo Y-s	21	21
7	(China) Liu XL (China) Qiu ZH	15	12

==== Section 2 ====
First Round
3	(Japan) H Endo (Japan) K Hayakawa	21	21
(Malaysia) Koo K K (Malaysia) Tan B H	18	14
(Poland) A Cwalina (Poland) P Wacha	23	21
Q4	(Sweden) R Eidestedt (Sweden) N Ruponen	21	18
5	(Denmark) M Conrad-Petersen (Denmark) M P Kolding	21	21
(Chinese Taipei) Chen H-l (Chinese Taipei) Wang C-l	17	12
(Denmark) M Christiansen (Denmark) D Daugaard	21	18	16
(Chinese Taipei) Lee J-h (Chinese Taipei) Lee Y	14	21	21

Second Round
3	(Japan) H Endo (Japan) K Hayakawa	21	21
(Poland) A Cwalina (Poland) P Wacha	12	13
5	(Denmark) M Conrad-Petersen (Denmark) M P Kolding	20	21	21
(Chinese Taipei) Lee J-h (Chinese Taipei) Lee Y	22	19	14

Quarterfinals
3	(Japan) H Endo (Japan) K Hayakawa	21	21
5	(Denmark) M Conrad-Petersen (Denmark) M P Kolding	16	17

=== Bottom half ===
==== Section 3 ====
First Round
Q2	(Germany) M Lamsfuss (Germany) M E Seidel	21	19	9
(Denmark) K Astrup (Denmark) A S Rasmussen	12	21	21
(Thailand) D Puavaranukroh (Thailand) K Kittinupong	17	19
8	(Russia) V Ivanov (Russia) I Sozonov	21	21
(India) M Attri (India) B S Reddy	21	19	21
(England) M Ellis (England) C Langridge	16	21	17
(Chinese Taipei) Lee S-m (Chinese Taipei) Tsai C-h	25	19	21
4	(South Korea) Kim G-j (South Korea) Kim S-r	23	21	19

Second Round
(Denmark) K Astrup (Denmark) A S Rasmussen	14	15
8	(Russia) V Ivanov (Russia) I Sozonov	21	21
(India) M Attri (India) B S Reddy	10	10
(Chinese Taipei) Lee S-m (Chinese Taipei) Tsai C-h	21	21

Quarterfinals
8	(Russia) V Ivanov (Russia) I Sozonov	21	21
(Chinese Taipei) Lee S-m (Chinese Taipei) Tsai C-h	14	15

==== Section 4 ====
First Round
PFQ	(Belgium) M Dierickx (Belgium) F Golinski	13	13
(Japan) T Kamura (Japan) K Sonoda	21	21
(China) Wang YY (China) Zhang W	17	13
6	(South Korea) Ko S-h (South Korea) Shin B-c	21	21
PFQ	(Germany) R Beck (Germany) P Kaesbauer	17	16
(Malaysia) Goh V S (Malaysia) Tan W K	21	21
Q1	(Croatia) Z Durkinjak (Croatia) Z Hoelbling	13	13
2	(China) Chai B (China) Hong W	21	21

Second Round
(Japan) T Kamura (Japan) K Sonoda	16	11
6	(South Korea) Ko S-h (South Korea) Shin B-c	21	21
(Malaysia) Goh V S (Malaysia) Tan W K	19	21	22
2	(China) Chai B (China) Hong W	21	12	20

Quarterfinals
6	(South Korea) Ko S-h (South Korea) Shin B-c	22	23
(Malaysia) Goh V S (Malaysia) Tan W K	20	21

== Women's doubles ==
=== Seeds ===
1. (Indonesia) Nitya Krishinda Maheswari / Greysia Polii (semifinals)
2. (Japan) Misaki Matsutomo / Ayaka Takahashi (semifinals)
3. (Denmark) Christinna Pedersen / Kamilla Rytter Juhl (withdrawn)
4. (South Korea) Jung Kyung-eun / Shin Seung-chan (second round)
5. (China) Tang Yuanting / Yu Yang (withdrawn)
6. (South Korea) Chang Ye-na / Lee So-hee (second round)
7. (Netherlands) Eefje Muskens / Selena Piek (first round)
8. (Japan) Naoko Fukuman / Kurumi Yonao (first round)

=== Finals ===
Semifinals
1	(Indonesia) Nitya Krishinda Maheswari (Indonesia) Greysia Polii	21	22	19
(Thailand) Puttita Supajirakul (Thailand) Sapsiree Taerattanachai	16	24	21
PFQ	(China) Huang Yaqiong (China) Tang Jinhua	21	19	21
2	(Japan) Misaki Matsutomo (Japan) Ayaka Takahashi	9	21	18

Final
(Thailand) Puttita Supajirakul (Thailand) Sapsiree Taerattanachai	14	18
PFQ	(China) Huang Yaqiong (China) Tang Jinhua	21	21

=== Top half ===
==== Section 1 ====
First Round
1	(Indonesia) N K Maheswari (Indonesia) G Polii	21	21
(United States) E Lee (United States) P L Obanana	16	5
(South Korea) Eom H-w (South Korea) Kim H-n	15	21	21
(Russia) A Chervyakova (Russia) O Morozova	21	16	17
8	(Japan) N Fukuman (Japan) K Yonao	12	21	18
(Bulgaria) G Stoeva (Bulgaria) S Stoeva	21	15	21
PFQ	(Denmark) M Fruergaard (Denmark) S Thygesen	21	22	21
(Chinese Taipei) Hsu Y-c (Chinese Taipei) Pai Y-p	13	24	13

Second Round
1	(Indonesia) N K Maheswari (Indonesia) G Polii	21	21
(South Korea) Eom H-w (South Korea) Kim H-n	5	14
(Bulgaria) G Stoeva (Bulgaria) S Stoeva	21	21
PFQ	(Denmark) M Fruergaard (Denmark) S Thygesen	15	13

Quarterfinals
1	(Indonesia) N K Maheswari (Indonesia) G Polii	21	21
(Bulgaria) G Stoeva (Bulgaria) S Stoeva	17	10

==== Section 2 ====
First Round
4	(South Korea) Jung K-e (South Korea) Shin S-c	21	21
Q4	(Denmark) J Finne-Ipsen (Denmark) R S Hansen	12	10
PFQ	(Chinese Taipei) Chen H-h (Chinese Taipei) Huang M-c	8	16
(China) Chen QC (China) Jia YF	21	21
7	(Netherlands) E Muskens (Netherlands) S Piek	11	10
(Japan) Y Fukushima (Japan) S Hirota	21	21
(Thailand) P Supajirakul (Thailand) S Taerattanachai	21	21
(Germany) I Herttrich (Germany) B Michels	12	16

Second Round
4	(South Korea) Jung K-e (South Korea) Shin S-c	15	9
(China) Chen QC (China) Jia YF	21	21
(Japan) Y Fukushima (Japan) S Hirota	12	21	7
(Thailand) P Supajirakul (Thailand) S Taerattanachai	21	16	21

Quarterfinals
(China) Chen QC (China) Jia YF	21	16	18
(Thailand) P Supajirakul (Thailand) S Taerattanachai	16	21	21

=== Bottom half ===
==== Section 3 ====
First Round
Q2	(Denmark) E J Moller (Denmark) C Sentow	17	14
(Netherlands) S Barning (Netherlands) I Tabeling	21	21
PFQ	(China) Huang YQ (China) Tang JH	21	21
PFQ	(France) M Batomene (France) E Lefel	12	11
(South Korea) Go A-r (South Korea) Yoo H-w	21	21
(Chinese Taipei) Hsieh P-c (Chinese Taipei) Wu T-j	13	16
(Thailand) J Kittiharakul (Thailand) R Prajongjai	21	21
PFQ	(France) A Fontaine (France) A Tran	12	14

Second Round
(Netherlands) S Barning (Netherlands) I Tabeling	20	14
PFQ	(China) Huang YQ (China) Tang JH	22	21
(South Korea) Go A-r (South Korea) Yoo H-w	19	21	15
(Thailand) J Kittiharakul (Thailand) R Prajongjai	21	13	21

Quarterfinals
PFQ	(China) Huang YQ (China) Tang JH	21	21
(Thailand) J Kittiharakul (Thailand) R Prajongjai	18	14

==== Section 4 ====
First Round
(Japan) S Matuso (Japan) M Naito	21	21
(Germany) J Goliszewski (Germany) C Nelte	16	12
Q3	(Switzerland) N Fankhauser (Malaysia) S Saniru	8	6
6	(South Korea) Chang Y-n (South Korea) Lee S-h	21	21
(England) H Olver (England) L Smith	21	21
PFQ	(Sweden) C Nistad (Sweden) E Wengberg	12	9
Q1	(Germany) J Karnott (Germany) F Volkmann	4	4
2	(Japan) M Matsutomo (Japan) A Takahashi	21	21

Second Round
(Japan) S Matuso (Japan) M Naito	11	21	9
6	(South Korea) Chang Y-n (South Korea) Lee S-h	21	18	7^{r}
(England) H Olver (England) L Smith	12	15
2	(Japan) M Matsutomo (Japan) A Takahashi	21	21

Quarterfinals
(Japan) S Matuso (Japan) M Naito	9	21	11
2	(Japan) M Matsutomo (Japan) A Takahashi	21	18	21

== Mixed doubles ==
=== Seeds ===
1. (South Korea) Ko Sung-hyun / Kim Ha-na (champion)
2. (England) Chris Adcock / Gabrielle Adcock (second round)
3. (China) Lu Kai / Huang Yaqiong (first round)
4. (Hong Kong) Lee Chun Hei / Chau Hoi Wah (first round)
5. (South Korea) Shin Baek-cheol / Chae Yoo-jung (final)
6. (South Korea) Choi Sol-gyu / Eom Hye-won (semifinals)
7. (Malaysia) Chan Peng Soon / Goh Liu Ying (first round)
8. (Netherlands) Jacco Arends / Selena Piek (first round)

=== Finals ===
Semifinals
1	(South Korea) Ko Sung-hyun (South Korea) Kim Ha-na	18	21	21
6	(South Korea) Choi Sol-gyu (South Korea) Eom Hye-won	21	13	17
(Poland) Robert Mateusiak (Poland) Nadiezda Zieba	14	21	12
5	(South Korea) Shin Baek-cheol (South Korea) Chae Yoo-jung	21	17	21

Final
1	(South Korea) Ko Sung-hyun (South Korea) Kim Ha-na	21	21
5	(South Korea) Shin Baek-cheol (South Korea) Chae Yoo-jung	19	12

=== Top half ===
==== Section 1 ====
First Round
1	(South Korea) Ko S-h (South Korea) Kim H-n	21	21
(Japan) K Kazuno (Japan) A Kurihara	9	13
(Thailand) B Issara (Thailand) S Amitrapai	21	17	13
Q2	(Germany) M Lamsfuss (Germany) I Herttrich	17	21	21
8	(Netherlands) J Arends (Netherlands) S Piek	18	15
(Singapore) D B Chrisnanta (Singapore) Vanessa Neo Y Y	21	21
(Republic of Ireland) S Magee (Republic of Ireland) C Magee	18	17
(Russia) V Durkin (Russia) N Vislova	21	21

Second Round
1	(South Korea) Ko S-h (South Korea) Kim H-n	18	21	21
Q2	(Germany) M Lamsfuss (Germany) I Herttrich	21	10	15
(Singapore) D B Chrisnanta (Singapore) Vanessa Neo Y Y	11	21	18
(Russia) V Durkin (Russia) N Vislova	21	11	21

Quarterfinals
1	(South Korea) Ko S-h (South Korea) Kim H-n	21	21
(Russia) V Durkin (Russia) N Vislova	10	10

==== Section 2 ====
First Round
3	(China) Lu K (China) Huang YQ	19	24	20
(South Korea) Lee Y-d (South Korea) Lee S-h	21	22	22
(France) R Labar (France) E Lefel	9	21	14
PFQ	(South Korea) Yoo Y-s (South Korea) Chang Y-n	21	16	21
6	(South Korea) Choi S-g (South Korea) Eom H-w	21	21
Q1	(Vietnam) Do T D (Vietnam) Pham N T	13	15
Q4	(Germany) P Kaesbauer (Germany) F Volkmann	22	13	18
(Chinese Taipei) Lee J-h (Chinese Taipei) Wu T-j	20	21	21

Second Round
(South Korea) Lee Y-d (South Korea) Lee S-h	w	/	o
PFQ	(South Korea) Yoo Y-s (South Korea) Chang Y-n
6	(South Korea) Choi S-g (South Korea) Eom H-w	21	21
(Chinese Taipei) Lee J-h (Chinese Taipei) Wu T-j	15	13

Quarterfinals
(South Korea) Lee Y-d (South Korea) Lee S-h	18	18
6	(South Korea) Choi S-g (South Korea) Eom H-w	21	21

=== Bottom half ===
==== Section 3 ====
First Round
(Canada) T Ng (Canada) A Bruce	14	25
(Japan) K Sonoda (Japan) N Fukuman	21	27
(Poland) R Mateusiak (Poland) N Zieba	21	21
7	(Malaysia) Chan P S (Malaysia) Goh L Y	19	14
(Denmark) M Christiansen (Denmark) L Grebak	18	20
PFQ	(Sweden) N Ruponen (Sweden) A Hogstrom	21	22
(France) G Mittelheisser (France) A Fontaine	21	19	21
4	(Hong Kong) Lee C H (Hong Kong) Chau H W	16	21	19

Second Round
(Japan) K Sonoda (Japan) N Fukuman	11	11
(Poland) R Mateusiak (Poland) N Zieba	21	21
PFQ	(Sweden) N Ruponen (Sweden) A Hogstrom	9	21	21
(France) G Mittelheisser (France) A Fontaine	21	17	19

Quarterfinals
(Poland) R Mateusiak (Poland) N Zieba	12	24	21
PFQ	(Sweden) N Ruponen (Sweden) A Hogstrom	21	22	13

==== Section 4 ====
First Round
(United States) P Chew (United States) J Subandhi	21	21
(Chinese Taipei) Liao M-c (Chinese Taipei) Chen H-h	17	16
(China) Zhang W (China) Tang JH	18	17
5	(South Korea) Shin B-c (South Korea) Chae Y-j	21	21
Q3	(Thailand) D Puavaranukroh (Thailand) S Taerattanachai	21	21
(South Korea) Kim G-j (South Korea) Shin S-c	17	17
(Germany) M Fuchs (Germany) B Michels	21	12	10
2	(England) C Adcock (England) G Adcock	17	21	21

Second Round
(United States) P Chew (United States) J Subandhi	14	4
5	(South Korea) Shin B-c (South Korea) Chae Y-j	21	21
Q3	(Thailand) D Puavaranukroh (Thailand) S Taerattanachai	12	21	26
2	(England) C Adcock (England) G Adcock	21	15	24

Quarterfinals
5	(South Korea) Shin B-c (South Korea) Chae Y-j	29	21
Q3	(Thailand) D Puavaranukroh (Thailand) S Taerattanachai	27	9

Preceded by 2016 Thailand Masters Grand Prix Gold	BWF Grand Prix and Grand Prix Gold; 2016 BWF Season	Succeeded by 2016 Swiss Open Grand Prix Gold
