= 2016 Thailand Masters Grand Prix Gold =

Tournament details
- Dates: 8–13 February 2016
- Level: Grand Prix Gold
- Total prize money: US$120,000
- Venue: Nimibutr Stadium
- Location: Bangkok, Thailand

Champions
- Men's singles: (South Korea) Lee Hyun-il
- Women's singles: (Thailand) Ratchanok Intanon
- Men's doubles: (Indonesia) Mohammad Ahsan (Indonesia) Hendra Setiawan
- Women's doubles: (China) Tian Qing (China) Zhao Yunlei
- Mixed doubles: (China) Zheng Siwei (China) Chen Qingchen

The 2016 Thailand Masters Grand Prix Gold was the third Grand Prix's badminton tournament of the 2016 BWF Grand Prix and Grand Prix Gold. It was the inaugural edition of the Thailand Masters. The tournament was held at the Nimibutr Stadium in Bangkok, Thailand on February 8–13, 2016 and had a total purse of $120,000.

== Men's singles ==
=== Seeds ===
1. (South Korea) Lee Hyun-il (champion)
2. (South Korea) Son Wan-ho (semifinals)
3. (Hong Kong) Hu Yun (final)
4. (India) Parupalli Kashyap (withdrawn)
5. (Hong Kong) Wei Nan (quarterfinals)
6. (Hong Kong) Ng Ka Long (quarterfinals)
7. (Germany) Marc Zwiebler (withdrawn)
8. (South Korea) Lee Dong-keun (first round)
9. (South Korea) Jeon Hyeok-jin (quarterfinals)
10. (Hong Kong) Wong Wing Ki (first round)
11. (Thailand) Boonsak Ponsana (third round)
12. (Thailand) Tanongsak Saensomboonsuk (semifinals)
13. (Singapore) Derek Wong Zi Liang (first round)
14. (Malaysia) Zulfadli Zulkiffli (third round)
15. (India) Sameer Verma (quarterfinals)
16. (Israel) Misha Zilberman (first round)

=== Finals ===
Quarterfinals
1	(South Korea) Lee Hyun-il	21	21
5	(Hong Kong) Wei Nan	18	13
12	(Thailand) Tanongsak Saensomboonsuk	21	21	21
6	(Hong Kong) Ng Ka Long	23	11	18
15	(India) Sameer Verma	21	21	11
3	(Hong Kong) Hu Yun	23	11	21
9	(South Korea) Jeon Hyeok-jin	21	12	11
2	(South Korea) Son Wan-ho	11	21	21

Semifinals
1	(South Korea) Lee Hyun-il	21	21
12	(Thailand) Tanongsak Saensomboonsuk	11	11
3	(Hong Kong) Hu Yun	11	24	21
2	(South Korea) Son Wan-ho	21	22	16

Final
1	(South Korea) Lee Hyun-il	21	21
3	(Hong Kong) Hu Yun	18	19

=== Top half ===
==== Section 1 ====
First Round
1	(South Korea) Lee H-i	21	21
(India) S Jaiswal	16	13
(Scotland) A Casey	17	19
(Malaysia) Z Zulkiffli	21	21
13	(Singapore) Derek Wong Z L	12	19
(Indonesia) E Sukamta	21	21
(Thailand) K Wangcharoen	21	14	21
(Indonesia) K H Wibowo	8	21	7

Second Round
1	(South Korea) Lee H-i	21	21
(Malaysia) Z Zulkiffli	13	16
(Indonesia) E Sukamta	21	21	18
(Thailand) K Wangcharoen	23	19	21

Third Round
1	(South Korea) Lee H-i	21	21
(Thailand) K Wangcharoen	11	15

==== Section 2 ====
First Round
5	(Hong Kong) Wei N	16	21	21
(Indonesia) M B Pangisthu	21	14	14
Q7	(Thailand) W Phakjarung	14	14
(Thailand) K Leelavechbutr	21	21
10	(Hong Kong) Wong W K	11	14
(China) Guo K	21	21
(Indonesia) S Santoso	21	21
Q3	(Thailand) N Singrueang	7	9

Second Round
5	(Hong Kong) Wei N	21	21
(Thailand) K Leelavechbutr	9	12
(China) Guo K	18	15
(Indonesia) S Santoso	21	21

Third Round
5	(Hong Kong) Wei N	17	21	21
(Indonesia) S Santoso	21	14	14

==== Section 3 ====
First Round
PFQ	(India) N Vashist	9	5
(South Korea) Heo K-h	21	21
Q1	(China) Sun FX	21	21
PFQ	(Israel) A Bass	14	15
12	(Thailand) T Saensomboonsuk	21	21
(Indonesia) R F Ivanudin	11	13
(Indonesia) F I Hadmadi	18	21	21
(Iran) F Khanjani	21	9	10

Second Round
(South Korea) Heo K-h	21	21
Q1	(China) Sun FX	5	16
12	(Thailand) T Saensomboonsuk	21	21
(Indonesia) F I Hadmadi	15	8

Third Round
(South Korea) Heo K-h	11	21	14
12	(Thailand) T Saensomboonsuk	21	16	21

==== Section 4 ====
First Round
6	(Hong Kong) Ng K L	w	/	o
(South Africa) J Maliekal
(Malaysia) Chong Y H	21	13	15
Q2	(Malaysia) Goh G C	14	21	21
16	(Israel) M Zilberman	23	16
(Thailand) P Thongnuam	25	21
(Indonesia) F A Kholik	21	18	21
(Malaysia) M A Abdul Latif	12	21	12

Second Round
6	(Hong Kong) Ng K L	21	21
Q2	(Malaysia) Goh G C	11	10
(Thailand) P Thongnuam	18	19
(Indonesia) F A Kholik	21	21

Third Round
6	(Hong Kong) Ng K L	21	21
(Indonesia) F A Kholik	15	14

=== Bottom half ===
==== Section 5 ====
First Round
(Thailand) T Huansuriya	12	13
(India) A Pawar	21	21
(Singapore) Loh K Y	19	13
15	(India) S Verma	21	21
(Mexico) L Muñoz	12	10
(India) H Dani	21	21
(Indonesia) S D Kuncoro	16	21	21
8	(South Korea) Lee D-k	21	15	17

Second Round
(India) A Pawar	4	19
15	(India) S Verma	21	21
(India) H Dani	18	21	21
(Indonesia) S D Kuncoro	21	14	14

Third Round
15	(India) S Verma	21	21
(India) H Dani	17	14

==== Section 6 ====
First Round
Q5	(Thailand) P Jarasjindawong	13	19
(Indonesia) P Akbar	21	21
(Austria) L Wraber	17	12
11	(Thailand) B Ponsana	21	21
(Egypt) A A El Khateeb	15	16
(Malaysia) Lim C W	21	21
(Thailand) K Phetpradap	23	12
3	(Hong Kong) Hu Y	25	21

Second Round
(Indonesia) P Akbar	15	11
11	(Thailand) B Ponsana	21	21
(Malaysia) Lim C W	12	17
3	(Hong Kong) Hu Y	21	21

Third Round
11	(Thailand) B Ponsana	18	12
3	(Hong Kong) Hu Y	21	21

==== Section 7 ====
First Round
(India) S Dey	21	21
Q6	(Thailand) S Piyawatcharavijit	13	17
Q4	(Thailand) N Nantatheero	16	8
9	(South Korea) Jeon H-j	21	21
(Iran) V-S Eskandari	10	8
(Thailand) A Namkul	21	21
(Malaysia) Tan C S	21	21
PFQ	(Indonesia) M R Reyhaldi	15	14

Second Round
(India) S Dey	15	15
9	(South Korea) Jeon H-j	21	21
(Thailand) A Namkul	16	15
(Malaysia) Tan C S	21	21

Third Round
9	(South Korea) Jeon H-j	21	18	21
(Malaysia) Tan C S	17	21	9

==== Section 8 ====
First Round
(Indonesia) A Marteen	11	21	21
(Thailand) M Narongrit	21	14	19
(Indonesia) A Susanto	17	16
14	(Malaysia) Z Zulkiffli	21	21
Q8	(Thailand) P Thongnuam	14	11
PFQ	(China) Zhao JP	21	21
(China) Lin GP	15	21	6
2	(South Korea) Son W-h	21	12	21

Second Round
(Indonesia) A Marteen	11	19
14	(Malaysia) Z Zulkiffli	21	21
PFQ	(China) Zhao JP	14	6
2	(South Korea) Son W-h	21	21

Third Round
14	(Malaysia) Z Zulkiffli	17	14
2	(South Korea) Son W-h	21	21

== Women's singles ==
=== Seeds ===
1. (India) Saina Nehwal (withdrawn)
2. (Thailand) Ratchanok Intanon (champion)
3. (South Korea) Sung Ji-hyun (semifinals)
4. (China) Sun Yu (final)
5. (South Korea) Bae Yeon-ju (second round)
6. (Thailand) Busanan Ongbumrungpan (semifinals)
7. (Thailand) Porntip Buranaprasertsuk (quarterfinals)
8. (Hong Kong) Cheung Ngan Yi (first round)

=== Finals ===
Semifinals
6	(Thailand) Busanan Ongbumrungpan	16	11
4	(China) Sun Yu	21	21
3	(South Korea) Sung Ji-hyun	15	20
2	(Thailand) Ratchanok Intanon	21	22

Final
4	(China) Sun Yu	19	21	17
2	(Thailand) Ratchanok Intanon	21	18	21

=== Top half ===
==== Section 1 ====
First Round
PFQ	(Indonesia) R A Riodingin	21	8	10
PFQ	(Indonesia) D D Ayustine	19	21	21
PFQ	(Indonesia) F Angguni	14	21	17
(Germany) K Schnaase	21	16	21
6	(Thailand) B Ongbumrungpan	21	14	21
(United States) I Wang	13	21	14
Q3	(China) Chen XX	21	21	21
PFQ	(Thailand) T Poopradubsil	23	15	17

Second Round
PFQ	(Indonesia) D D Ayustine	21	11	21
(Germany) K Schnaase	19	21	19
6	(Thailand) B Ongbumrungpan	21	21
Q3	(China) Chen XX	18	14

Quarterfinals
PFQ	(Indonesia) D D Ayustine	5	18
6	(Thailand) B Ongbumrungpan	21	21

==== Section 2 ====
First Round
4	(China) Sun Y	21	21
Q1	(Thailand) P Chaiwan	9	9
(Egypt) H Hosny	10	16
(Thailand) S Katethong	21	21
5	(South Korea) Bae Y-j	21	21
(Thailand) P Chochuwong	8	12
(Hong Kong) Yip P Y	21	21
(Austria) E Baldauf	5	7

Second Round
4	(China) Sun Y	21	21
(Thailand) S Katethong	11	17
5	(South Korea) Bae Y-j	17	8
(Hong Kong) Yip P Y	21	21

Quarterfinals
4	(China) Sun Y	21	21
(Hong Kong) Yip P Y	15	9

=== Bottom half ===
==== Section 3 ====
First Round
(South Korea) Kim H-m	21	21
(Australia) J Lai	9	15
Q4	(Thailand) O Jongsathapornparn	16	15
7	(Thailand) P Buranaprasertsuk	21	21
(Indonesia) R Hartawan	21	7	21
(Singapore) Liang XY	13	21	14
(India) S Rane
3	(South Korea) Sung J-h	w	/	o

Second Round
(South Korea) Kim H-m	15	14
7	(Thailand) P Buranaprasertsuk	21	21
(Indonesia) R Hartawan	11	10
3	(South Korea) Sung J-h	21	21

Quarterfinals
7	(Thailand) P Buranaprasertsuk	17	10
3	(South Korea) Sung J-h	21	21

==== Section 4 ====
First Round
(India) T Lad
(United States) R Schafer	w	/	o
(Thailand) N Jindapol	21	21
8	(Hong Kong) Cheung N Y	15	13
(Nigeria) G Gabriel	21	12	14
Q2	(Thailand) S Mingchua	18	21	21
(South Korea) Lee J-m	10	12
2	(Thailand) R Intanon	21	21

Second Round
(United States) R Schafer	16	8
(Thailand) N Jindapol	21	21
Q2	(Thailand) S Mingchua	12	13
2	(Thailand) R Intanon	21	21

Quarterfinals
(Thailand) N Jindapol	14	14
2	(Thailand) R Intanon	21	21

== Men's doubles ==
=== Seeds ===
1. (Indonesia) Mohammad Ahsan / Hendra Setiawan (champion)
2. (South Korea) Kim Gi-jung / Kim Sa-rang (final)
3. (South Korea) Ko Sung-hyun / Shin Baek-cheol (semifinals)
4. (Indonesia) Angga Pratama / Ricky Karanda Suwardi (withdrawn)
5. (China) Li Junhui / Liu Yuchen (quarterfinals)
6. (Malaysia) Goh V Shem / Tan Wee Kiong (quarterfinals)
7. (Indonesia) Markus Fernaldi Gideon / Kevin Sanjaya Sukamuljo (second round)
8. (Malaysia) Koo Kien Keat / Tan Boon Heong (quarterfinals)

=== Finals ===
Semifinals
1	(Indonesia) Mohammad Ahsan (Indonesia) Hendra Setiawan	21	13	21
3	(South Korea) Ko Sung-hyun (South Korea) Shin Baek-cheol	15	21	18
(China) Huang Kaixiang (China) Zheng Siwei	19	15
2	(South Korea) Kim Gi-jung (South Korea) Kim Sa-rang	21	21

Final
1	(Indonesia) Mohammad Ahsan (Indonesia) Hendra Setiawan	12	21	21
2	(South Korea) Kim Gi-jung (South Korea) Kim Sa-rang	21	15	12

=== Top half ===
==== Section 1 ====
First Round
1	(Indonesia) M Ahsan (Indonesia) H Setiawan	21	21
PFQ	(Thailand) K Tantianankul (Thailand) N Uakoolwarawat	14	12
Q1	(Indonesia) L A Nugroho (Thailand) P Vilailak	19	24	21
Q2	(Thailand) K Cholprasertsuk (Thailand) N Yordphaisong	21	22	16
6	(Malaysia) Goh V S (Malaysia) Tan W K	21	21
(Hong Kong) Or C C (Hong Kong) Tang C M	16	10
Q4	(Thailand) I Apisuk (Thailand) S Pol-Gul	21	20	21
(Indonesia) H K Clinton (Indonesia) R Swastedian	16	22	11

Second Round
1	(Indonesia) M Ahsan (Indonesia) H Setiawan	21	21
Q1	(Indonesia) L A Nugroho (Thailand) P Vilailak	14	16
6	(Malaysia) Goh V S (Malaysia) Tan W K	21	21
Q4	(Thailand) I Apisuk (Thailand) S Pol-Gul	11	17

Quarterfinals
1	(Indonesia) M Ahsan (Indonesia) H Setiawan	19	21	21
6	(Malaysia) Goh V S (Malaysia) Tan W K	21	16	13

==== Section 2 ====
First Round
3	(South Korea) Ko S-h (South Korea) Shin B-c	21	23
(Germany) M Fuchs (Germany) J Schöttler	8	21
(India) M A Raju (India) V G Prasad	13	15
(Indonesia) A Adistia (Indonesia) A P Rahmanto Putra	21	21
5	(China) Li JH (China) Liu YC	21	12	21
(Thailand) B Issara (Thailand) N Puangpuapech	18	21	19
(Thailand) S Anugritayawon (Singapore) C Triyachart	21	23
(Hong Kong) Chan T K (Hong Kong) Law C H	14	21

Second Round
3	(South Korea) Ko S-h (South Korea) Shin B-c	21	21
(Indonesia) A Adistia (Indonesia) A P Rahmanto Putra	10	17
5	(China) Li JH (China) Liu YC	21	21
(Thailand) S Anugritayawon (Singapore) C Triyachart	17	11

Quarterfinals
3	(South Korea) Ko S-h (South Korea) Shin B-c	22	21
5	(China) Li JH (China) Liu YC	20	18

=== Bottom half ===
==== Section 3 ====
First Round
(China) Wang YY (China) Zhang W	21	21
(Thailand) W Ampunsupan (Thailand) T Isriyanate	15	13
(Hong Kong) Chan Y L (Hong Kong) Lee C H	17	13
7	(Indonesia) M F Gideon (Indonesia) K S Sukamuljo	21	21
(China) Huang KX (China) Zheng SW	21	21
Q3	(Malaysia) M A Abdul Latif (Malaysia) N M A Ayub	10	14
(United States) P Chew (United States) S Pongnairat	16	12
PFQ	(India) A Francis (India) T Kona	21	21

Second Round
(China) Wang YY (China) Zhang W	21	21
7	(Indonesia) M F Gideon (Indonesia) K S Sukamuljo	10	17
(China) Huang KX (China) Zheng SW	21	21
PFQ	(India) A Francis (India) T Kona	11	9

Quarterfinals
(China) Wang YY (China) Zhang W	18	18
(China) Huang KX (China) Zheng SW	21	21

==== Section 4 ====
First Round
(Egypt) A A El Khateeb (Egypt) A Kashkal	7	3
(South Korea) Choi S-g (South Korea) Kim J-h	21	21
(Iran) V-S Eskandani (Iran) F Khanjani	9^{r}
8	(Malaysia) Koo K K (Malaysia) Tan B H	11
(Thailand) D Puavaranukroh (Thailand) K Kedren	21	17	21
(India) K Nandagopal (India) S Ramchandran	19	21	13
(Indonesia) H A Gunawan (Indonesia) M Kido	18	21
2	(South Korea) Kim G-j (South Korea) Kim S-r	21	23

Second Round
(South Korea) Choi S-g (South Korea) Kim J-h	16	15
8	(Malaysia) Koo K K (Malaysia) Tan B H	21	21
(Thailand) D Puavaranukroh (Thailand) K Kedren	14	18
2	(South Korea) Kim G-j (South Korea) Kim S-r	21	21

Quarterfinals
8	(Malaysia) Koo K K (Malaysia) Tan B H	10	12
2	(South Korea) Kim G-j (South Korea) Kim S-r	21	21

== Women's doubles ==
=== Seeds ===
1. (South Korea) Chang Ye-na / Lee So-hee (second round)
2. (South Korea) Jung Kyung-eun / Shin Seung-chan (semifinals)
3. (China) Tian Qing / Zhao Yunlei (champion)
4. (Malaysia) Vivian Hoo Kah Mun / Woon Khe Wei (semifinals)
5. (China) Tang Yuanting / Yu Yang (final)
6. (South Korea) Go Ah-ra / Yoo Hae-won (quarterfinals)
7. (Bulgaria) Gabriela Stoeva / Stefani Stoeva (first round)
8. (Malaysia) Amelia Alicia Anscelly / Soong Fie Cho (first round)

=== Finals ===
Semifinals
5	(China) Tang Yuanting (China) Yu Yang	21	21
4	(Malaysia) Vivian Hoo Kah Mun (Malaysia) Woon Khe Wei	11	11
3	(China) Tian Qing (China) Zhao Yunlei	21	21
2	(South Korea) Jung Kyung-Eun (South Korea) Shin Seung-chan	10	17

Final
5	(China) Tang Yuanting (China) Yu Yang	21	12	21
3	(China) Tian Qing (China) Zhao Yunlei	11	21	23

=== Top half ===
==== Section 1 ====
First Round
1	(South Korea) Chang Y-n (South Korea) Lee S-h	21	21
Q3	(Thailand) N Promdej (Thailand) R Sripaiboon	4	4
(China) Chen QC (China) Jia YF	21	21
(Thailand) S Amitrapai (Thailand) P Chochuwong	16	12
5	(China) Tang YT (China) Yu Y	21	24
PFQ	(Thailand) T Kiawcha-on (Thailand) T Wongya	11	22
(Indonesia) A Rahayu (Indonesia) J F Sugiarto	20	21	22
PFQ	(Thailand) P Pransopon (Thailand) S Suwannakitborihan	22	16	20

Second Round
1	(South Korea) Chang Y-n (South Korea) Lee S-h	21	14	12
(China) Chen QC (China) Jia YF	17	21	21
5	(China) Tang YT (China) Yu Y	21	21
(Indonesia) A Rahayu (Indonesia) J F Sugiarto	12	12

Quarterfinals
(China) Chen QC (China) Jia YF	8	11
5	(China) Tang YT (China) Yu Y	21	21

==== Section 2 ====
First Round
4	(Malaysia) Vivian Hoo K M (Malaysia) Woon K W	21	21
(India) K Antil (India) L Dahiya	5	5
Q2	(Russia) A Tyurina (Russia) D Tyurina	4	13
(Indonesia) T R Nuraidah (Indonesia) R A Pradipta	21	21
7	(Bulgaria) G Stoeva (Bulgaria) S Stoeva	12	19
(Thailand) P Supajirakul (Thailand) S Taerattanachai	21	21
(Indonesia) S R Andini (Indonesia) M Oklamona	21	21
(Thailand) N Chatputtarn (Thailand) F Loog	11	17

Second Round
4	(Malaysia) Vivian Hoo K M (Malaysia) Woon K W	17	21	21
(Indonesia) T R Nuraidah (Indonesia) R A Pradipta	21	14	19
(Thailand) P Supajirakul (Thailand) S Taerattanachai	21	21
(Indonesia) S R Andini (Indonesia) M Oklamona	9	8

Quarterfinals
4	(Malaysia) Vivian Hoo K M (Malaysia) Woon K W	22	11	21
(Thailand) P Supajirakul (Thailand) S Taerattanachai	20	21	9

=== Bottom half ===
==== Section 3 ====
First Round
Q1	(Thailand) N Jaiareree (Thailand) T Kaweenuntavong	25	23
(Thailand) S Cheuboca (Thailand) C Korepap	23	21
(Thailand) J Kititharakul (Thailand) R Prajongjai	21	11
8	(Malaysia) A A Anscelly (Malaysia) Soong F C	7	15^{r}
(India) D Nair (India) M Sahdev
(Indonesia) K N Hanadia (Indonesia) D T Permatasari	w	/	o
Q4	(Thailand) R Laisuan (Thailand) A Sapniti	11	8
3	(China) Tian Q (China) Zhao YL	21	21

Second Round
Q1	(Thailand) N Jaiareree (Thailand) T Kaweenuntavong	4	7
(Thailand) J Kititharakul (Thailand) R Prajongjai	21	21
(Indonesia) K N Hanadia (Indonesia) D T Permatasari	8	6
3	(China) Tian Q (China) Zhao YL	21	21

Quarterfinals
(Thailand) J Kititharakul (Thailand) R Prajongjai	19	12
3	(China) Tian Q (China) Zhao YL	21	21

==== Section 4 ====
First Round
(Indonesia) P Z Bernadeth (Indonesia) A P Lejarsar Variella	21	21
(Egypt) N Ashraf (Egypt) M Eltanany	9	7
(Thailand) S Patimon (Thailand) K Sukklad	6	10
6	(South Korea) Go A-r (South Korea) Yoo H-w	21	21
(Hong Kong) Tse Y S (Hong Kong) Yeung N T	22	21
PFQ	(Thailand) R Iamratanamaetheekul (Thailand) S Mingchua	20	16
(Thailand) C Chaladchalam (Thailand) P Muenwong	9	17
2	(South Korea) Jung K-e (South Korea) Shin S-c	21	21

Second Round
(Indonesia) P Z Bernadeth (Indonesia) A P Lejarsar Variella	10	11
6	(South Korea) Go A-r (South Korea) Yoo H-w	21	21
(Hong Kong) Tse Y S (Hong Kong) Yeung N T	6	12
2	(South Korea) Jung K-e (South Korea) Shin S-c	21	21

Quarterfinals
6	(South Korea) Go A-r (South Korea) Yoo H-w	16	19
2	(South Korea) Jung K-e (South Korea) Shin S-c	21	21

== Mixed doubles ==
=== Seeds ===
1. (South Korea) Ko Sung-hyun / Kim Ha-na (quarterfinals)
2. (Indonesia) Praveen Jordan / Debby Susanto (first round)
3. (Hong Kong) Lee Chun Hei / Chau Hoi Wah (semifinals)
4. (South Korea) Shin Baek-Cheol / Chae Yoo-jung (first round)
5. (South Korea) Choi Sol-gyu / Eom Hye-won (first round)
6. (Indonesia) Edi Subaktiar / Gloria Emanuelle Widjaja (first round)
7. (Malaysia) Chan Peng Soon / Goh Liu Ying (final)
8. (Germany) Michael Fuchs / Birgit Michels (second round)

=== Finals ===
Semifinals
(China) Zheng Siwei (China) Chen Qingchen	21	21
3	(Hong Kong) Lee Chun Hei (Hong Kong) Chau Hoi Wah	15	11
(Thailand) Bodin Issara (Thailand) Savitree Amitrapai	18	14
7	(Malaysia) Chan Peng Soon (Malaysia) Goh Liu Ying	21	21

Final
(China) Zheng Siwei (China) Chen Qingchen	21	21
7	(Malaysia) Chan Peng Soon (Malaysia) Goh Liu Ying	17	15

=== Top half ===
==== Section 1 ====
First Round
1	(South Korea) Ko S-h (South Korea) Kim H-n	21	16	21
(United States) P Chew (United States) J Subandhi	14	21	12
(South Korea) Kim G-j (South Korea) Shin S-c	21	21
Q4	(Hong Kong) Tang C M (Hong Kong) Ng T Y	15	18
6	(Indonesia) E Subaktiar (Indonesia) G E Widjaja	12	16
(China) Zheng SW (China) Chen QC	21	21
(Russia) V Durkin (Russia) N Vislova	21	17	21
(Indonesia) A E Prasetya (Indonesia) A Saufika	18	21	16

Second Round
1	(South Korea) Ko S-h (South Korea) Kim H-n	21	21
(South Korea) Kim G-j (South Korea) Shin S-c	15	16
(China) Zheng SW (China) Chen QC	21	21
(Russia) V Durkin (Russia) N Vislova	9	17

Quarterfinals
1	(South Korea) Ko S-h (South Korea) Kim H-n	19	20
(China) Zheng SW (China) Chen QC	21	22

==== Section 2 ====
First Round
3	(Hong Kong) Lee C H (Hong Kong) Chau H W	21	21
(Egypt) A Kashkal (Egypt) H Hosny	13	15
(Indonesia) M Kido (Indonesia) P Z Bernadeth	21	21
(India) V G Prasad (India) J Dewangan	15	5
5	(South Korea) Choi S-g (South Korea) Eom H-w	14	21	25
(Singapore) Terry Hee Y K (Singapore) Tan W T	21	19	27
(Thailand) S Prapakamol (Thailand) S Thoungthongkam	21	20	21
(Indonesia) R Widianto (Indonesia) R P Dili	17	22	19

Second Round
3	(Hong Kong) Lee C H (Hong Kong) Chau H W	21	21
(Indonesia) M Kido (Indonesia) P Z Bernadeth	18	11
(Singapore) Terry Hee Y K (Singapore) Tan W T	16	13
(Thailand) S Prapakamol (Thailand) S Thoungthongkam	21	21

Quarterfinals
3	(Hong Kong) Lee C H (Hong Kong) Chau H W	w	/	o
(Thailand) S Prapakamol (Thailand) S Thoungthongkam

=== Bottom half ===
==== Section 3 ====
First Round
Q3	(Thailand) K Namdash (Thailand) N Jaiareree	12	12
(Indonesia) I Fadhilah (Indonesia) W Anggraini	21	21
Q1	(Thailand) T Isriyanate (Thailand) P Chochuwong	19	16
8	(Germany) M Fuchs (Germany) B Michels	21	21
(China) Huang KX (China) Huang DP	19	21	18
(Hong Kong) Chan Y L (Hong Kong) Tse Y S	21	13	21
(Thailand) B Issara (Thailand) S Amitrapai	21	23
4	(South Korea) Shin B-c (South Korea) Chae Y-j	15	21

Second Round
(Indonesia) I Fadhilah (Indonesia) W Anggraini	21	21
8	(Germany) M Fuchs (Germany) B Michels	16	15
(Hong Kong) Chan Y L (Hong Kong) Tse Y S	17	21	11
(Thailand) B Issara (Thailand) S Amitrapai	21	12	21

Quarterfinals
(Indonesia) I Fadhilah (Indonesia) W Anggraini	14	9
(Thailand) B Issara (Thailand) S Amitrapai	21	21

==== Section 4 ====
First Round
(Russia) E Dremin (Russia) E Dimova
PFQ	(Indonesia) R Swastedian (Indonesia) A Rahayu	w	/	o
(Singapore) C Triyachart (Thailand) N Saengchote	17	19
7	(Malaysia) Chan P S (Malaysia) Goh L Y	21	21
(Thailand) N Puangpuapech (Thailand) J Kititharakul	21	13	21
(Singapore) D B Chrisnanta (Singapore) Vanessa Neo Y Y	16	21	16
Q2	(Thailand) D Puavaranukroh (Thailand) S Taerattanachai	21	21
2	(Indonesia) P Jordan (Indonesia) D Susanto	13	15

Second Round
PFQ	(Indonesia) R Swastedian (Indonesia) A Rahayu	10	8
7	(Malaysia) Chan P S (Malaysia) Goh L Y	21	21
(Thailand) N Puangpuapech (Thailand) J Kititharakul	12	9
Q2	(Thailand) D Puavaranukroh (Thailand) S Taerattanachai	21	21

Quarterfinals
7	(Malaysia) Chan P S (Malaysia) Goh L Y	21	21
Q2	(Thailand) D Puavaranukroh (Thailand) S Taerattanachai	15	16

Preceded by 2016 Syed Modi International Grand Prix Gold	BWF Grand Prix and Grand Prix Gold; 2016 BWF Season	Succeeded by 2016 German Open Grand Prix Gold
