= 2016 Indonesian Masters Grand Prix Gold =

Tournament details
- Dates: 6–11 September
- Edition: 7th
- Level: Grand Prix Gold
- Total prize money: US$120,000
- Venue: Gedung Dome
- Location: Balikpapan, Indonesia

Champions
- Men's singles: (China) Shi Yuqi
- Women's singles: (Thailand) Busanan Ongbumrungpan
- Men's doubles: (Indonesia) Wahyu Nayaka (Indonesia) Kevin Sanjaya Sukamuljo
- Women's doubles: (South Korea) Chae Yoo-jung (South Korea) Kim So-yeong
- Mixed doubles: (Indonesia) Ronald Alexander (Indonesia) Melati Daeva Oktavianti

The 2016 Indonesian Masters Grand Prix Gold (officially known as the Yonex Sunrise Indonesian Masters 2016 for sponsorship reasons) was the 13th grand prix's badminton tournament of the 2016 BWF Grand Prix Gold and Grand Prix. The tournament was held at the Balikpapan Sport and Convention Center in Balikpapan, East Kalimantan, Indonesia on 6 to 11 September 2016 and had a total purse of $120,000.

== Men's singles ==
=== Seeds ===
1. (Hong Kong) Wei Nan (semifinal)
2. (Indonesia) Ihsan Maulana Mustofa (quarterfinal)
3. (India) Ajay Jayaram (quarterfinal)
4. (Indonesia) Jonatan Christie (second round)
5. (Thailand) Tanongsak Saensomboonsuk (quarterfinal)
6. (Indonesia) Sony Dwi Kuncoro (second round)
7. (India) Prannoy H. S. (third round)
8. (Malaysia) Iskandar Zulkarnain Zainuddin (withdrew)
9. (Indonesia) Anthony Sinisuka Ginting (first round)
10. (India) B. Sai Praneeth (third round)
11. (China) Shi Yuqi (champion)
12. (China) Huang Yuxiang (final)
13. (Malaysia) Goh Soon Huat (third round)
14. (Malaysia) Soo Teck Zhi (first round)
15. (China) Xue Song (third round)
16. (Malaysia) Chong Wei Feng (second round)

=== Finals ===
Quarterfinals
1	(Hong Kong) Wei Nan	15	25	21
5	(Thailand) Tanongsak Saensomboonsuk	21	23	18
(Indonesia) Muhammad Bayu Pangisthu	6	19
12	(China) Huang Yuxiang	21	21
11	(China) Shi Yuqi	21	21
3	(India) Ajay Jayaram	12	10
(China) Zhao Junpeng	22	21	21
2	(Indonesia) Ihsan Maulana Mustofa	24	16	15

Semifinals
1	(Hong Kong) Wei Nan	11	21	20
12	(China) Huang Yuxiang	21	18	22
11	(China) Shi Yuqi	21	15	21
(China) Zhao Junpeng	11	21	12

Final
12	(China) Huang Yuxiang	12	0^{r}
11	(China) Shi Yuqi	21	11

=== Top half ===
==== Section 1 ====
First Round
1	(Hong Kong) Wei N	21	21
(Indonesia) E Shafira	14	13
(Indonesia) M R Reyhaldi	16	13
Q8	(Indonesia) I S Yulianto	21	21
13	(Malaysia) Goh S H	21	21
(Indonesia) V A Saputra	10	13
(Indonesia) A Susanto	11	9
Q3	(Indonesia) A Yunus	21	21

Second Round
1	(Hong Kong) Wei N	21	21
Q8	(Indonesia) I S Yulianto	8	12
13	(Malaysia) Goh S H	21	21
Q3	(Indonesia) A Yunus	18	16

Third Round
1	(Hong Kong) Wei N	21	21
13	(Malaysia) Goh S H	18	14

==== Section 2 ====
First Round
5	(Thailand) T Saensomboonsuk	21	21
(Canada) T Chiu	10	13
PFQ	(Indonesia) Y Sidik	12	9
Q4	(South Korea) Kim M-k	21	21
10	(India) S P Bhamidipati	21	13	21
(Indonesia) R Subagja	18	21	13
(Indonesia) S H Rhustavito	21	19	12
(Thailand) K Wangcharoen	16	21	21

Second Round
5	(Thailand) T Saensomboonsuk	21	21
Q4	(South Korea) Kim M-k	12	10
10	(India) S P Bhamidipati	18	21	21
(Thailand) K Wangcharoen	21	14	15

Third Round
5	(Thailand) T Saensomboonsuk	21	21
10	(India) S P Bhamidipati	14	13

==== Section 3 ====
First Round
4	(Indonesia) J Christie	21	21
Q7	(Indonesia) T Haryanto	8	8
(Indonesia) M B Pangisthu	21	21	21
Q2	(Indonesia) H Kurniawan	23	14	16
15	(China) Xue S	21	21
(Indonesia) E Sukamta	17	13
Q5	(Indonesia) C A Dwi Wardoyo	21	17	21
(Indonesia) V V Nirwanda	11	21	13

Second Round
4	(Indonesia) J Christie	21	13	19
(Indonesia) M B Pangisthu	14	21	21
15	(China) Xue S	21	21
Q5	(Indonesia) C A Dwi Wardoyo	14	16

Third Round
(Indonesia) M B Pangisthu	21	22
15	(China) Xue S	14	20

==== Section 4 ====
First Round
7	(India) Prannoy H S	16	21	21
(South Korea) Ha Y-w	21	19	14
(Indonesia) A Marteen	16	21	16
(Malaysia) Soong J V	21	15	21
12	(China) Huang YX	21	21
(Thailand) K Leelavechabutr	17	13
(India) H Dani	18	16
(Indonesia) S Santoso	21	21

Second Round
7	(India) Prannoy H S	21	21
(Malaysia) Soong J V	17	9
12	(China) Huang YX	21	21
(Indonesia) S Santoso	14	16

Third Round
7	(India) Prannoy H S	21	19	21
12	(China) Huang YX	19	21	23

=== Bottom half ===
==== Section 5 ====
First Round
(Malaysia) D Liew	21	21
(Indonesia) R F Ivanudin	14	13
(Indonesia) W Y Prasetyo	12	18
11	(China) Shi YQ	21	21
(Indonesia) K B Alexander	8	10
(Hong Kong) Lee C Y	21	21
(Thailand) A Namkul	21	14	17
6	(Indonesia) S D Kuncoro	17	21	21

Second Round
(Malaysia) D Liew	15	21	15
11	(China) Shi YQ	21	15	21
(Hong Kong) Lee C Y	17	21	21
6	(Indonesia) S D Kuncoro	21	14	19

Third Round
11	(China) Shi YQ	22	21
(Hong Kong) Lee C Y	20	13

==== Section 6 ====
First Round
(India) K Dharmamer	23	14	13
(Indonesia) R A Megananda	21	21	21
(Indonesia) K A Nugraha	13	21	21
14	(Malaysia) Soo T Z	21	19	14
(India) K Parupalli	21	21
(Indonesia) N E Sulistyo	6	8
(Indonesia) Y F Mainaky	8	9
3	(India) A Jayaram	21	21

Second Round
(Indonesia) R A Megananda	21	23
(Indonesia) K A Nugraha	7	21
(India) K Parupalli	7	12
3	(India) A Jayaram	21	21

Third Round
(Indonesia) R A Megananda	21	12	19
3	(India) A Jayaram	18	21	21

==== Section 7 ====
First Round
(Thailand) S Avihingsanon	21	21
(Indonesia) P A Sudrajat	13	19
(China) Zhao JP	21	22
9	(Indonesia) A S Ginting	18	20
(Indonesia) F I Hadmadi	w	/	o
(India) A Yelegar
(Indonesia) K H Wibowo	17	14
PFQ	(Indonesia) T A Mahbub	21	21

Second Round
(Thailand) S Avihingsanon	11	19
(China) Zhao JP	21	21
(Indonesia) F I Hadmadi	21	21
PFQ	(Indonesia) T A Mahbub	14	15

Third Round
(China) Zhao JP	21	21	21
(Indonesia) F I Hadmadi	11	23	10

==== Section 8 ====
First Round
(Indonesia) F A Kholik	21	21
Q1	(Indonesia) A W Setiawan	14	13
(India) S Verma	7	9
16	(Malaysia) Chong W F	21	21
(Thailand) K Phetpradab	17	15
(South Korea) Heo K-h	21	21
Q6	(Indonesia) A K Zailani	12	13
2	(Indonesia) I M Mustofa	21	21

Second Round
(Indonesia) F A Kholik	21	21
16	(Malaysia) Chong W F	18	14
(South Korea) Heo K-h	21	4	13
2	(Indonesia) I M Mustofa	16	21	21

Third Round
(Indonesia) F A Kholik	21	9	17
2	(Indonesia) I M Mustofa	15	21	21

== Women's singles ==
=== Seeds ===
1. (Thailand) Busanan Ongbumrungpan (champion)
2. (Thailand) Nichaon Jindapon (semifinal)
3. (Indonesia) Lindaweni Fanetri (withdrew)
4. (Singapore) Liang Xiaoyu (second round)
5. (China) Chen Yufei (second round)
6. (Japan) Ayumi Mine (quarterfinal)
7. (Thailand) Pornpawee Chochuwong (semifinal)
8. (Malaysia) Goh Jin Wei (final)

=== Finals ===
Semifinals
1	(Thailand) Busanan Ongbumrungpan	16	21	21
7	(Thailand) Pornpawee Chochuwong	21	15	15
8	(Malaysia) Goh Jin Wei	21	21
2	(Thailand) Nichaon Jindapon	18	5

Final
1	(Thailand) Busanan Ongbumrungpan	21	21
8	(Malaysia) Goh Jin Wei	15	13

=== Top half ===
==== Section 1 ====
First Round
1	(Thailand) B Ongbumrungpan	21	22
(Malaysia) Ho Y M	12	20
(Indonesia) R A Riodingin	14	8
Q2	(China) Han Y	21	21
5	(China) Chen YF	21	21
(Indonesia) Y Y Susanto	10	13
(Indonesia) L A Mainaky	9	15
(South Korea) Lee J-m	21	21

Second Round
1	(Thailand) B Ongbumrungpan	26	21
Q2	(China) Han Y	24	10
5	(China) Chen YF	14	20
(South Korea) Lee J-m	21	22

Quarterfinals
1	(Thailand) B Ongbumrungpan	21	21
(South Korea) Lee J-m	14	11

==== Section 2 ====
First Round
PFQ	(China) Li Y	17	11
(Singapore) Yeo J M	21	21
(India) R S Gadde	14	14
(Indonesia) H Ramadhini	21	21
7	(Thailand) P Chochuwong	22	21
(Indonesia) H Desi	20	11
Q4	(South Korea) Lee M-j	13	14
(Indonesia) D D Ayustine	21	21

Second Round
(Singapore) Yeo J M	16	15
(Indonesia) H Ramadhini	21	21
7	(Thailand) P Chochuwong	21	21
(Indonesia) D D Ayustine	18	17

Quarterfinals
(Indonesia) H Ramadhini	8	15
7	(Thailand) P Chochuwong	21	21

=== Bottom half ===
==== Section 3 ====
First Round
Q3	(Indonesia) D V Putri	21	21
(Indonesia) F Angguni	16	14
(Indonesia) G M Tunjung	23	12
8	(Malaysia) Goh J W	25	21
(China) Gao FJ	21	12	21
(Indonesia) Fitriani	16	21	19
(India) P. C. Thulasi	12	5
4	(Singapore) Liang XY	21	21

Second Round
Q3	(Indonesia) D V Putri	17	10
8	(Malaysia) Goh J W	21	21
(China) Gao FJ	11	21	21
4	(Singapore) Liang XY	21	17	15

Quarterfinals
8	(Malaysia) Goh J W	21	21
(China) Gao FJ	16	18

==== Section 4 ====
First Round
(Indonesia) R Hartawan	21	21
(India) T Lad	14	19
Q1	(Indonesia) J Muljati	9	21
6	(Japan) A Mine	21	23
(Indonesia) G M Moningka	20	16
(Singapore) G Chua	22	21
(South Korea) Kim N-y	14	21	20
2	(Thailand) N Jindapon	21	15	22

Second Round
(Indonesia) R Hartawan	17	17
6	(Japan) A Mine	21	21
(Singapore) G Chua	9	13
2	(Thailand) N Jindapon	21	21

Quarterfinals
6	(Japan) A Mine	11	17
2	(Thailand) N Jindapon	21	21

== Men's doubles ==
=== Seeds ===
1. (Indonesia) Mohammad Ahsan / Hendra Setiawan (withdrew)
2. (Indonesia) Angga Pratama / Ricky Karanda Suwardi (semifinal)
3. (Indonesia) Berry Angriawan / Rian Agung Saputro (quarterfinal)
4. (Indonesia) Hardianto / Kenas Adi Haryanto (quarterfinal)
5. (Indonesia) Wahyu Nayaka / Kevin Sanjaya Sukamuljo (champion)
6. (China) Huang Kaixiang / Wang Yilyu (quarterfinal)
7. (Indonesia) Hendra Aprida Gunawan / Markis Kido (quarterfinal)
8. (Indonesia) Fajar Alfian / Muhammad Rian Ardianto (first round)

=== Finals ===
Semifinals
(China) Han Chengkai (China) Zhou Haodong	21	15	21
Q4	(Malaysia) Chooi Kah Ming (Malaysia) Low Juan Shen	18	21	19
5	(Indonesia) Wahyu Nayaka (Indonesia) Kevin Sanjaya Sukamuljo	21	18	21
2	(Indonesia) Angga Pratama (Indonesia) Ricky Karanda Suwardi	14	21	19

Final
(China) Han Chengkai (China) Zhou Haodong	16	18
5	(Indonesia) Wahyu Nayaka (Indonesia) Kevin Sanjaya Sukamuljo	21	21

=== Top half ===
==== Section 1 ====
First Round
PFQ	(Indonesia) Fe Kurniawan (Indonesia) Fr Kurniawan	15	14
(Indonesia) A Baariq (Indonesia) R Dhanriano	21	21
(China) Han CK (China) Zhou HD	21	21
(Indonesia) Y S Dasuki (Indonesia) D J Indrianto	9	11
6	(China) Huang KX (China) Wang YL	21	21
(Indonesia) W Astan (Indonesia) T Wardhana	5	10
(Indonesia) M Fachrikar (Indonesia) M R P Isfahani	19	21	14
(Singapore) T Hee (Singapore) Loh K H	21	13	21

Second Round
(Indonesia) A Baariq (Indonesia) R Dhanriano	21	8	14
(China) Han CK (China) Zhou HD	18	21	21
6	(China) Huang KX (China) Wang YL	21	21
(Singapore) T Hee (Singapore) Loh K H	14	10

Quarterfinals
(China) Han CK (China) Zhou HD	19	21	21
6	(China) Huang KX (China) Wang YL	21	15	13

==== Section 2 ====
First Round
4	(Indonesia) Hardianto (Indonesia) K A Haryanto	21	21
(Vietnam) Bao M (Vietnam) Duong B D	14	12
(Indonesia) C H Kudamassa (Indonesia) I A Wirawan	21	12	15
(Malaysia) Lim K W (Malaysia) Ong J G	19	21	21
8	(Indonesia) F Alfian (Indonesia) M R Ardianto	20	16
Q4	(Malaysia) Chooi K M (Malaysia) Low J S	22	21
Q2	(Indonesia) Y R Sugiarto (Indonesia) A Y Wirawan	21	11	21
(Indonesia) A P R Putra (Indonesia) R Swastedian	4	21	12

Second Round
4	(Indonesia) Hardianto (Indonesia) K A Haryanto	21	21
(Malaysia) Lim K W (Malaysia) Ong J G	13	15
Q4	(Malaysia) Chooi K M (Malaysia) Low J S	21	16	21
Q2	(Indonesia) Y R Sugiarto (Indonesia) A Y Wirawan	15	21	13

Quarterfinals
4	(Indonesia) Hardianto (Indonesia) K A Haryanto	21	15	18
Q4	(Malaysia) Chooi K M (Malaysia) Low J S	15	21	21

=== Bottom half ===
==== Section 3 ====
First Round
(Indonesia) A Mahardika (Indonesia) W C Saputro	15	21	10
(Malaysia) Ong Y S (Malaysia) Teo E Y	21	16	21
(China) He JT (China) Tan Q	30	12	17
5	(Indonesia) W Nayaka (Indonesia) K S Sukamuljo	28	21	21
Q1	(Indonesia) L A Nughoro (Indonesia) T Supriadi	21	21
(Indonesia) D G Belatma (Indonesia) A Yusuf	18	16
(Singapore) D B Chrisnanta (Singapore) H Wijaya	16	17
3	(Indonesia) B Angriawan (Indonesia) R A Saputro	21	21

Second Round
(Malaysia) Ong Y S (Malaysia) Teo E Y	12	15
5	(Indonesia) W Nayaka (Indonesia) K S Sukamuljo	21	21
Q1	(Indonesia) L A Nughoro (Indonesia) T Supriadi	21	16	19
3	(Indonesia) B Angriawan (Indonesia) R A Saputro	13	21	21

Quarterfinals
5	(Indonesia) W Nayaka (Indonesia) K S Sukamuljo	18	21	23
3	(Indonesia) B Angriawan (Indonesia) R A Saputro	21	16	21

==== Section 4 ====
First Round
(South Korea) Chung E-s (South Korea) Kim D-y	21	21
(Indonesia) F Abimanyu (Indonesia) I Fadhilah	7	11
Q3	(India) N Kidambi (India) S Shukla	10	14
7	(Indonesia) H A Gunawan (Indonesia) M Kido	21	21
(Indonesia) A B Cahyono (Indonesia) A Sudrajat	21	21	18
(Hong Kong) Chan T K (Hong Kong) Law C H	14	23	21
(Malaysia) Tan C T (Malaysia) Tan W G	12	21
2	(Indonesia) A Pratama (Indonesia) R K Suwardi	21	23

Second Round
(South Korea) Chung E-s (South Korea) Kim D-y	17	13
7	(Indonesia) H A Gunawan (Indonesia) M Kido	21	21
(Hong Kong) Chan T K (Hong Kong) Law C H	16	21	13
2	(Indonesia) A Pratama (Indonesia) R K Suwardi	21	19	21

Quarterfinals
7	(Indonesia) H A Gunawan (Indonesia) M Kido	15	14
2	(Indonesia) A Pratama (Indonesia) R K Suwardi	21	21

== Women's doubles ==
=== Seeds ===
1. (Indonesia) Anggia Shitta Awanda / Ni Ketut Mahadewi Istirani (withdrew)
2. (Indonesia) Della Destiara Haris / Rosyita Eka Putri Sari (semifinal)
3. (Thailand) Jongkolphan Kititharakul / Rawinda Prajongjai (final)
4. (South Korea) Chae Yoo-jung / Kim So-yeong (champion)

=== Finals ===
Semifinals
(Indonesia) Tiara Rosalia Nuraidah (Indonesia) Rizki Amelia Pradipta	17	23	19
3	(Thailand) Jongkolphan Kititharakul (Thailand) Rawinda Prajongjai	21	21	21
4	(South Korea) Chae Yoo-jung (South Korea) Kim So-yeong	21	13	21
2	(Indonesia) Della Destiara Haris (Indonesia) Rosyita Eka Putri Sari	18	21	16

Final
3	(Thailand) Jongkolphan Kititharakul (Thailand) Rawinda Prajongjai	18	20
4	(South Korea) Chae Yoo-jung (South Korea) Kim So-yeong	21	22

=== Top half ===
==== Section 1 ====
First Round
1	(Indonesia) A S Awanda (Indonesia) N K M Istirani
BYE
(China) Du Y (China) Xu Y	21	17	21
(Indonesia) D Fitriani (Indonesia) N Melati	14	21	17
(South Korea) Kim H-r (South Korea) Kong H-y	21	16
(Indonesia) M C Bandaso (Indonesia) S Kani	23	21
(Indonesia) T R Nuraidah (Indonesia) R A Pradipta	21	21
(Indonesia) S Fauziah (Indonesia) B M Rumambi	11	12

Second Round
1	(Indonesia) A S Awanda (Indonesia) N K M Istirani
(China) Du Y (China) Xu Y	w	/	o
(Indonesia) M C Bandaso (Indonesia) S Kani	10	17
(Indonesia) T R Nuraidah (Indonesia) R A Pradipta	21	21

Quarterfinals
(China) Du Y (China) Xu Y	20	14
(Indonesia) T R Nuraidah (Indonesia) R A Pradipta	22	21

==== Section 2 ====
First Round
3	(Thailand) J Kititharakul (Thailand) R Prajongjai
BYE
(China) Chen L (China) Li YH	21	21
(Indonesia) R Andriani (Indonesia) A S Sinaga	11	5
(Indonesia) R H Putri (Indonesia) R Rositawati	16	19
(Indonesia) N P Lestari (Indonesia) M C Sahputri	21	21
(Indonesia) S R Andini (Indonesia) Y Barkah	w	/	o
(Malaysia) Lee Z Q (India) P Sawant

Second Round
3	(Thailand) J Kititharakul (Thailand) R Prajongjai	21	21
(China) Chen L (China) Li YH	11	17
(Indonesia) N P Lestari (Indonesia) M C Sahputri	10	21	17
(Indonesia) S R Andini (Indonesia) Y Barkah	21	19	21

Quarterfinals
3	(Thailand) J Kititharakul (Thailand) R Prajongjai	21	21
(Indonesia) S R Andini (Indonesia) Y Barkah	15	11

=== Bottom half ===
==== Section 3 ====
First Round
(Indonesia) R Amelia (Malaysia) A Cheong	21	21
(Indonesia) M D S Saraswati (Indonesia) N M Sulistya Devi	9	9
(Indonesia) E Agus (Indonesia) C S Ayunidha	21	13	19
(Indonesia) A M Khasanah (Indonesia) F A Nawangwulan	18	21	21
(Indonesia) M Lukmanda (Indonesia) B F Romadhini	17	21	20
(China) Hu YX (China) Zhou CM	21	18	22
BYE
4	(South Korea) Chae Y-j (South Korea) Kim S-y

Second Round
(Indonesia) R Amelia (Malaysia) A Cheong	21	21
(Indonesia) A M Khasanah (Indonesia) F A Nawangwulan	8	11
(China) Hu YX (China) Zhou CM	23	17	14
4	(South Korea) Chae Y-j (South Korea) Kim S-y	21	21	21

Quarterfinals
(Indonesia) R Amelia (Malaysia) A Cheong	9	18
4	(South Korea) Chae Y-j (South Korea) Kim S-y	21	21

==== Section 4 ====
First Round
(Indonesia) V Dewi (Indonesia) D S Rahmawati	6	11
(Thailand) P Chochuwong (Thailand) C Taechavorasinskun	21	21
(Indonesia) G R Imawan (Indonesia) M Oklamona	21	21
(Indonesia) N Herloardjo (Indonesia) A C Mandang	14	9
(Indonesia) Z M R Permata (Indonesia) V D Rumate	8	10
(Indonesia) M D Giovani (Indonesia) T O Kusumah	21	21
BYE
2	(Indonesia) D D Haris (Indonesia) R E Putri Sari

Second Round
(Thailand) P Chochuwong (Thailand) C Taechavorasinskun	20	21	21
(Indonesia) G R Imawan (Indonesia) M Oklamona	22	14	15
(Indonesia) M D Giovani (Indonesia) T O Kusumah	11	8
2	(Indonesia) D D Haris (Indonesia) R E Putri Sari	21	21

Quarterfinals
(Thailand) P Chochuwong (Thailand) C Taechavorasinskun
2	(Indonesia) D D Haris (Indonesia) R E Putri Sari	w	/	o

== Mixed doubles ==
=== Seeds ===
1. (Indonesia) Praveen Jordan / Debby Susanto (withdrew)
2. (Indonesia) Ronald Alexander / Melati Daeva Oktavianti (champion)
3. (Malaysia) Tan Kian Meng / Lai Pei Jing (final)
4. (Indonesia) Hafiz Faisal / Shella Devi Aulia (semifinal)
5. (China) Huang Kaixiang / Li Yinhui (quarterfinal)
6. (Singapore) Terry Hee / Tan Wei Han (withdrew)
7. (South Korea) Chung Eui-seok / Chae Yoo-jung (second round)
8. (Indonesia) Edi Subaktiar / Richi Puspita Dili (semifinal)

=== Finals ===
Semifinals
8	(Indonesia) Edi Subaktiar (Indonesia) Richi Puspita Dili	19	15
3	(Malaysia) Tan Kian Meng (Malaysia) Lai Pei Jing	21	21
4	(Indonesia) Hafiz Faisal (Indonesia) Shella Devi Aulia	20	16
2	(Indonesia) Ronald Alexander (Indonesia) Melati Daeva Oktavianti	22	21

Final
3	(Malaysia) Tan Kian Meng (Malaysia) Lai Pei Jing	16	17
2	(Indonesia) Ronald Alexander (Indonesia) Melati Daeva Oktavianti	21	21

=== Top half ===
==== Section 1 ====
First Round
PFQ	(Indonesia) R Dhanriano (Indonesia) Y Barkah	21	21
(Indonesia) B Drajat (Indonesia) A C Mandang	7	14
Q4	(Indonesia) A Ramadiansyah (Indonesia) A Wiratama	20	19
(Indonesia) I Fadhilah (Indonesia) W Anggraini	22	21
8	(Indonesia) E Subaktiar (Indonesia) R P Dili	21	21
(China) Han CK (China) Zhou CM	16	15
(Indonesia) Y R Sugiarto (Indonesia) A Rovita	18	21	21
Q1	(Indonesia) H Tandjaya (Indonesia) F A Nawangwulan	21	7	12

Second Round
PFQ	(Indonesia) R Dhanriano (Indonesia) Y Barkah	15	13
(Indonesia) I Fadhilah (Indonesia) W Anggraini	21	21
8	(Indonesia) E Subaktiar (Indonesia) R P Dili	21	21
(Indonesia) Y R Sugiarto (Indonesia) A Rovita	4	8

Quarterfinals
(Indonesia) I Fadhilah (Indonesia) W Anggraini	21	25	16
8	(Indonesia) E Subaktiar (Indonesia) R P Dili	18	27	21

==== Section 2 ====
First Round
3	(Malaysia) Tan K M (Malaysia) Lai P J	21	24
(Indonesia) R Widianto (Indonesia) G E Widjaja	17	22
(Indonesia) A Y Wirawan (Indonesia) N Melati	25	23
PFQ	(Indonesia) F Abimanyu (Indonesia) B M Rumambi	23	21
PFQ	(Indonesia) A Syahnawi (Indonesia) M V L Teneh	21	9	12
(Indonesia) L A Nugroho (Indonesia) R Amelia	17	21	21
(South Korea) Kim D-y (South Korea) Kim H-r	14	21	12
PFQ	(China) Zhou HD (China) Hu YX	21	17	21

Second Round
3	(Malaysia) Tan K M (Malaysia) Lai P J	18	22	21
(Indonesia) A Y Wirawan (Indonesia) N Melati	21	20	16
(Indonesia) L A Nugroho (Indonesia) R Amelia	22	21	21
PFQ	(China) Zhou HD (China) Hu YX	24	16	19

Quarterfinals
3	(Malaysia) Tan K M (Malaysia) Lai P J	21	21
(Indonesia) L A Nugroho (Indonesia) R Amelia	8	14

=== Bottom half ===
==== Section 3 ====
First Round
Q2	(Indonesia) E R Purnomo (Indonesia) D S Rahmawati	21	21
(Indonesia) Y F Mainaky (Indonesia) L A Mainaky	9	10
(Indonesia) A B Cahyono (Indonesia) D A Surya	8	12
5	(China) Huang KX (China) Li YH	21	21
Q3	(Indonesia) A Susanto (Indonesia) E Kurnianti	21	21
(Indonesia) H J P Wibowo (Indonesia) A M Khasanah	12	11
PFQ	(Indonesia) Fe Kurniawan (Indonesia) D Fitriani	14	10
4	(Indonesia) H Faisal (Indonesia) S D Aulia	21	21

Second Round
Q2	(Indonesia) E R Purnomo (Indonesia) D S Rahmawati	9	12
5	(China) Huang KX (China) Li YH	21	21
Q3	(Indonesia) A Susanto (Indonesia) E Kurnianti	8	13
4	(Indonesia) H Faisal (Indonesia) S D Aulia	21	21

Quarterfinals
5	(China) Huang KX (China) Li YH	21	19	15
4	(Indonesia) H Faisal (Indonesia) S D Aulia	16	21	21

==== Section 4 ====
First Round
(Indonesia) R A Nugroho (Indonesia) M Mahmudin	15	21	11
(China) He JT (China) Du Y	21	16	21
(Indonesia) R Rivaldy (Indonesia) V A Sukoco	12	14
7	(South Korea) Chung E-s (South Korea) Chae Y-j	21	21
(China) Tan Q (China) Xu Y	15	24	21
(Indonesia) Y E Saputra (Indonesia) M G Islami	21	22	18
(Indonesia) R Swastedian (Indonesia) S Fauziah	12	19
2	(Indonesia) R Alexander (Indonesia) M D Oktavianti	21	21

Second Round
(China) He JT (China) Du Y	21	21
7	(South Korea) Chung E-s (South Korea) Chae Y-j	15	16
(China) Tan Q (China) Xu Y	13	15
2	(Indonesia) R Alexander (Indonesia) M D Oktavianti	21	21

Quarterfinals
(China) He JT (China) Du Y	21	17	17
2	(Indonesia) R Alexander (Indonesia) M D Oktavianti	14	21	21

Preceded by 2016 Brazil Open Grand Prix	BWF Grand Prix and Grand Prix Gold; 2016 BWF Season	Succeeded by 2016 Thailand Open Grand Prix Gold
