= Balikpapan Sport and Convention Center =

Multipurpose Indoor Arena in Balikpapan, East Kalimantan, Indonesia

Coordinates: 1.243471°S 116.890244°E

- Dome Balikpapan; Balikpapan Dome; BSCC Dome
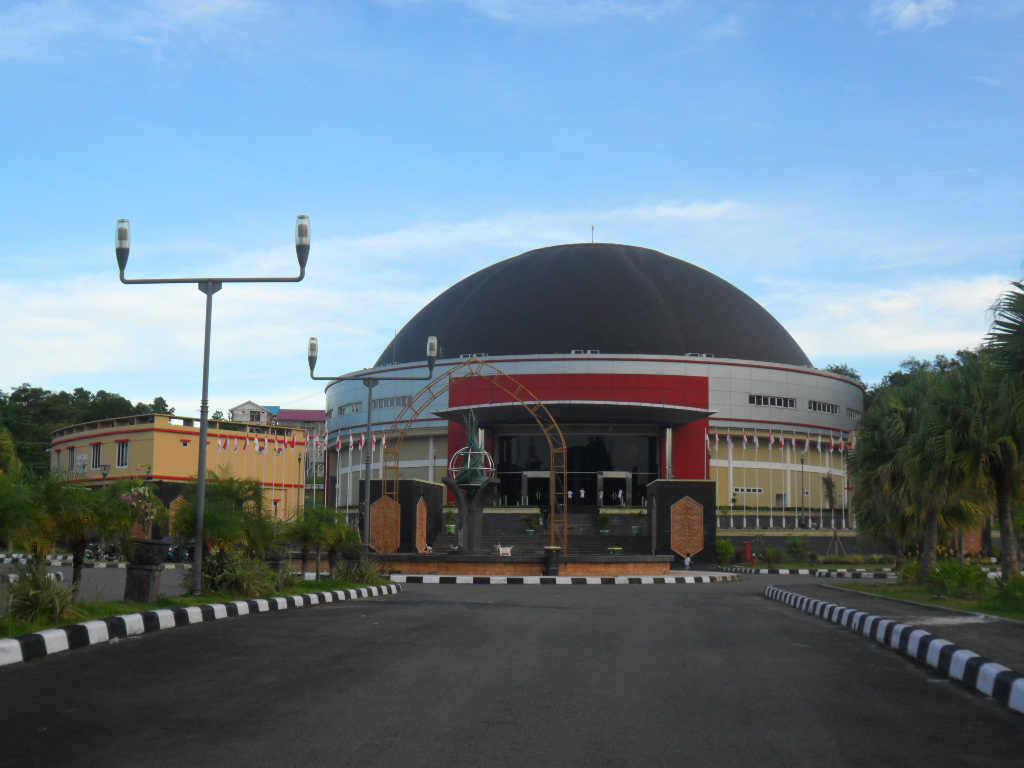
- Interactive map of Balikpapan Sport and Convention Center
- Location: South Balikpapan, Balikpapan, East Kalimantan
- Owner: City of Balikpapan Government
- Capacity: 2,500

Construction
- Built: 2004
- Opened: 2008

Balikpapan Sport and Convention Center or can be locally referred to as Dome Balikpapan is a multipurpose indoor arena located in Balikpapan, Indonesia. The building was built by the Government of Balikpapan for 2008 Pekan Olahraga Nasional.
